= 1990 KAL Cup Korea Open – Singles =

Singles
- 1990 KAL Cup Korea Open

Final
- Champion: (Austria) Alex Antonitsch
- Runner-up: (Australia) Pat Cash
- Score: 7–6, 6–3

Details
- Draw: 32
- Seeds: 8

Events
Singles	Doubles
← 1989 ·	KAL Cup Korea Open	· 1991 →

Robert Van't Hof was the defending champion, but did not participate this year.

Alex Antonitsch won the tournament, beating Pat Cash in the final, 7–6, 6–3.

== Seeds ==
1. (Australia) Wally Masur (second round)
2. (Israel) Amos Mansdorf (first round)
3. (United States) Paul Chamberlin (first round)
4. (New Zealand) Kelly Evernden (second round)
5. (Czechoslovakia) Milan Šrejber (quarterfinals)
6. (United States) Dan Goldie (semifinals)
7. (Sweden) Thomas Högstedt (first round)
8. (Israel) Gilad Bloom (semifinals)

== Draw ==
=== Key ===
- Q = Qualifier
- WC = Wild card
- LL = Lucky loser
- Alt = Alternate
- ITF = ITF entry
- PR = Protected ranking
- SR = Special ranking
- SE = Special exempt
- JE = Junior exempt
- JR = Junior Accelerator Programme entrant
- CO = College Accelerator Programme entrant
- NG = Next Gen Accelerator Program entrant
- w/o = Walkover
- r = Retired
- d = Defaulted

=== Finals ===
Semifinals
8	(Israel) Gilad Bloom	3	3
Q	(Australia) Pat Cash	6	6
6	(United States) Dan Goldie	6	3	6
(Austria) Alex Antonitsch	4	6	7

Final
Q	(Australia) Pat Cash	6	3
(Austria) Alex Antonitsch	7	6

=== Top half ===
First round
1	(Australia) W Masur	6	6
(Germany) C Saceanu	2	2
(United States) R Matuszewski	6	6	6
(Australia) J Stoltenberg	2	7	2
(Puerto Rico) M Nido	6	1
(Socialist Federal Republic of Yugoslavia) S Živojinović	0	0^{r}
(Australia) S Youl	3	1
8	(Israel) G Bloom	6	6
3	(United States) P Chamberlin	5	2
(Canada) G Connell	7	6
(Canada) M Laurendeau	4	3
Q	(Australia) P Cash	6	6
Q	(United Kingdom) N Brown	4	3
Q	(Sweden) J Carlsson	6	6
(Netherlands) T Nijssen	3	1
5	(Czechoslovakia) M Šrejber	6	6

Second round
1	(Australia) W Masur	7	6	4
(United States) R Matuszewski	6	7	6
(Puerto Rico) M Nido	4	3
8	(Israel) G Bloom	6	6
(Canada) G Connell	7	5	2
Q	(Australia) P Cash	6	7	6
Q	(Sweden) J Carlsson	0	4
5	(Czechoslovakia) M Šrejber	6	6

Quarterfinals
(United States) R Matuszewski	2	2
8	(Israel) G Bloom	6	6
Q	(Australia) P Cash	6	6
5	(Czechoslovakia) M Šrejber	2	3

Semifinals
8	(Israel) G Bloom	3	3
Q	(Australia) P Cash	6	6

=== Bottom half ===
First round
6	(United States) D Goldie	6	2	6
(Australia) T Woodbridge	4	6	4
WC	(South Korea) J-s Kim	5	4
(United States) J Rive	7	6
(Venezuela) N Pereira	1	3
Q	(Japan) S Matsuoka	6	6
WC	(South Korea) J-h Lee	3	1
4	(New Zealand) K Evernden	6	6
7	(Sweden) T Högstedt	5	6	4
(United States) L Shiras	7	4	6
(Austria) A Antonitsch	6	6
(United States) K Jones	4	4
WC	(South Korea) B-S Kim	5	6	6
(Germany) P Kühnen	7	2	7
(Sweden) L-A Wahlgren	6	7
2	(Israel) A Mansdorf	4	5

Second round
6	(United States) D Goldie	4	6	6
(United States) J Rive	6	3	4
Q	(Japan) S Matsuoka	6	6
4	(New Zealand) K Evernden	3	1
(United States) L Shiras	1	0
(Austria) A Antonitsch	6	6
(Germany) P Kühnen	6	6
(Sweden) L-A Wahlgren	0	1

Quarterfinals
6	(United States) D Goldie	7	6
Q	(Japan) S Matsuoka	5	2
(Austria) A Antonitsch	6	6
(Germany) P Kühnen	4	4

Semifinals
6	(United States) D Goldie	6	3	6
(Austria) A Antonitsch	4	6	7
