= 1991 KAL Cup Korea Open – Doubles =

Doubles
- 1991 KAL Cup Korea Open

Final
- Champions: (Austria) Alex Antonitsch (Israel) Gilad Bloom
- Runners-up: (United States) Kent Kinnear (United States) Sven Salumaa
- Score: 7–6, 6–1

Details
- Draw: 16
- Seeds: 4

Events
Singles	Doubles
← 1990 ·	KAL Cup Korea Open	· 1992 →

Grant Connell and Glenn Michibata were the defending champions, but lost in the quarterfinals this year.

Alex Antonitsch and Gilad Bloom won in the final 7–6, 6–1, against Kent Kinnear and Sven Salumaa.

== Seeds ==
1. (Canada) Grant Connell / (Canada) Glenn Michibata (quarterfinals)
2. (United States) Kent Kinnear / (United States) Sven Salumaa (final)
3. (United States) Brian Garrow / (United States) Bryan Shelton (first round)
4. (New Zealand) Kelly Evernden / (United States) Scott Melville (first round)

== Draw ==
=== Key ===
- Q = Qualifier
- WC = Wild card
- LL = Lucky loser
- Alt = Alternate
- SE = Special exempt
- PR = Protected ranking
- ITF = ITF entry
- JE = Junior exempt
- w/o = Walkover
- r = Retired
- d = Defaulted
- SR = Special ranking

=== Draw ===
First round
1	(Canada) G Connell (Canada) G Michibata	6	6
(Germany) P Kühnen (Germany) A Mronz	2	3
(South Korea) E-j Chang (South Korea) S-h Ji	7	7
(United Kingdom) N Brown (Netherlands) M Oosting	6	6
4	(New Zealand) K Evernden (United States) S Melville	3	6
(United States) T Nelson (United States) S Patridge	6	7
(United Kingdom) A Castle (New Zealand) B Derlin	6	3
(Austria) A Antonitsch (Israel) G Bloom	7	6
(Netherlands) R Krajicek (Netherlands) J Siemerink	6	6
(Netherlands) J Eltingh (United States) T Scherman	3	2
Q	(Mexico) L Herrera (Canada) A Sznajder	6	6
3	(United States) B Garrow (United States) B Shelton	0	3
(New Zealand) S Guy (Kenya) P Wekesa	7	2	4
(United States) J Grabb (United States) J Tarango	6	6	6
(Czechoslovakia) M Šrejber (Czechoslovakia) D Vacek	3	6	6
2	(United States) K Kinnear (United States) S Salumaa	6	3	7

Quarterfinals
1	(Canada) G Connell (Canada) G Michibata	4	5
(South Korea) E-j Chang (South Korea) S-h Ji	6	7
(United States) T Nelson (United States) S Patridge	2	2
(Austria) A Antonitsch (Israel) G Bloom	6	6
(Netherlands) R Krajicek (Netherlands) J Siemerink	6	6
Q	(Mexico) L Herrera (Canada) A Sznajder	4	4
(United States) J Grabb (United States) J Tarango	4	7	2
2	(United States) K Kinnear (United States) S Salumaa	6	6	6

Semifinals
(South Korea) E-j Chang (South Korea) S-h Ji	6	4	3
(Austria) A Antonitsch (Israel) G Bloom	4	6	6
(Netherlands) R Krajicek (Netherlands) J Siemerink	4	4
2	(United States) K Kinnear (United States) S Salumaa	6	6

Final
(Austria) A Antonitsch (Israel) G Bloom	7	6
2	(United States) K Kinnear (United States) S Salumaa	6	1
