= 1990 Davis Cup World Group =

- Date: 2 February – 2 December
- Edition: 10th

Champions
- United States
- Davis Cup

The World Group was the highest level of Davis Cup competition in 1990. The first-round losers went into the Davis Cup World Group qualifying round, and the winners progressed to the quarterfinals and were guaranteed a World Group spot for 1991.

West Germany were the defending champions, but were eliminated in the quarterfinals.

The United States won the title, defeating Australia in the final, 3–2. The final was held at the Florida Suncoast Dome in St. Petersburg, Florida, United States, from 30 November to 2 December. It was the US team's 29th Davis Cup title overall and their first since 1982.

== Participating teams ==
Participating teams
Argentina	Australia	Austria	Czechoslovakia
France	Germany	Israel	Italy
Mexico	Netherlands	New Zealand	Spain
Sweden	Switzerland	United States	Yugoslavia

== Draw ==
First round 2–4 February
Bremen, West Germany (indoor carpet)
West Germany	3
Netherlands	2
Buenos Aires, Argentina (clay)
Argentina	3
Israel	0
Christchurch, New Zealand (grass)
Yugoslavia	2
New Zealand	3
Perth, Australia (grass)
France	2
Australia	3
Prague, Czechoslovakia (indoor carpet)
Switzerland	0
Czechoslovakia	5
Carlsbad, CA, United States (hard)
Mexico	0
United States	4
Barcelona, Spain (clay)
Spain	2
Austria	3
Cagliari, Italy (clay)
Italy	3
Sweden	2

Quarterfinals; 30 March–2 April
Buenos Aires, Argentina (clay)
West Germany	2
Argentina	3
Brisbane, Australia (grass)
New Zealand	2
Australia	3
Prague, Czechoslovakia (indoor carpet)
Czechoslovakia	1
United States	4
Vienna, Austria (indoor clay)
Austria	5
Italy	0

Semifinals; 21–23 September
Sydney, Australia (grass)
Argentina	0
Australia	5
Vienna, Austria (clay)
United States	3
Austria	2

Final; 30 November–2 December
St. Petersburg, FL, United States (indoor clay)
Australia	2
United States	3

== First round ==
=== West Germany vs. Netherlands ===
West Germany
3
Stadthalle Bremen, Bremen, West Germany
2–4 February 1990
Carpet (indoors)

Netherlands
2

			1	2	3	4	5
1	(West Germany) (Netherlands)	Carl-Uwe Steeb; Michiel Schapers	6; 1	4; 6	6; 3	6; 3
2	(West Germany) (Netherlands)	Eric Jelen; Tom Nijssen	7^{7} 6^{5}	7; 5	3; 6	6; 3
3	(West Germany) (Netherlands)	Eric Jelen / Michael Stich; Tom Nijssen / Michiel Schapers	6; 4	6; 2	5; 7	6; 4
4	(West Germany) (Netherlands)	Michael Stich; Tom Nijssen	6^{5} 7^{7}	1; 6
5	(West Germany) (Netherlands)	Eric Jelen; Michiel Schapers	4; 6	6; 4	4; 6

=== Argentina vs. Israel ===
Argentina
3
Buenos Aires Lawn Tennis Club, Buenos Aires, Argentina
2–3 February 1990
Clay

Israel
0

			1	2	3	4	5
1	(Argentina) (Israel)	Alberto Mancini; Gilad Bloom	6; 2	7^{7} 6^{2}	6; 2
2	(Argentina) (Israel)	Martín Jaite; Amos Mansdorf	6; 4	6; 3	6; 2
3	(Argentina) (Israel)	Javier Frana / Gustavo Luza; Amos Mansdorf / Shahar Perkiss	6; 3	6; 0	7^{7} 6^{1}
4	(Argentina) (Israel)	Martín Jaite; Gilad Bloom						not played
5	(Argentina) (Israel)	Alberto Mancini; Amos Mansdorf						not played

=== New Zealand vs. Yugoslavia ===
New Zealand
3
Wilding Park, Christchurch, New Zealand
1–3 February 1990
Grass

Yugoslavia
2

			1	2	3	4	5
1	(New Zealand) (Socialist Federal Republic of Yugoslavia)	Kelly Evernden; Slobodan Živojinović	6^{1} 7^{7}	3; 6	6; 3	6; 2	6; 4
2	(New Zealand) (Socialist Federal Republic of Yugoslavia)	Brett Steven; Goran Prpić	6; 4	6; 2	6; 4
3	(New Zealand) (Socialist Federal Republic of Yugoslavia)	Kelly Evernden / Steve Guy; Goran Ivanišević / Slobodan Živojinović	5; 7	3; 6	7^{7} 6^{4}	5; 7
4	(New Zealand) (Socialist Federal Republic of Yugoslavia)	Kelly Evernden; Goran Prpić	6; 0	2; 6	6^{1} 7^{7}	6; 3	6; 2
5	(New Zealand) (Socialist Federal Republic of Yugoslavia)	Brett Steven; Slobodan Živojinović	5; 7	7^{9} 6^{7}	5; 7

=== Australia vs. France ===
Australia
3
Royal King's Park Tennis Club, Perth, Australia
2–4 February 1990
Grass

France
2

			1	2	3	4	5
1	(Australia) (France)	Darren Cahill; Henri Leconte	3; 6	5; 7	3; 6
2	(Australia) (France)	Wally Masur; Yannick Noah	4; 6	6; 3	4; 6	6; 3	6; 2
3	(Australia) (France)	Pat Cash / John Fitzgerald; Guy Forget / Yannick Noah	7^{8} 6^{6}	6; 4	6; 4
4	(Australia) (France)	Wally Masur; Henri Leconte	6; 4	3; 6	6; 3	2; 6	6; 4
5	(Australia) (France)	Darren Cahill; Yannick Noah	4; 6	4; 6

=== Czechoslovakia vs. Switzerland ===
Czechoslovakia
5
Sportovní hala, Prague, Czechoslovakia
2–4 February 1990
Carpet (indoors)

Switzerland
0

			1	2	3	4	5
1	(Czechoslovakia) (Switzerland)	Milan Šrejber; Marc Rosset	6; 3	6; 2	6; 4
2	(Czechoslovakia) (Switzerland)	Miloslav Mečíř; Jakob Hlasek	7^{7} 6^{5}	6; 2	6; 1
3	(Czechoslovakia) (Switzerland)	Petr Korda / Milan Šrejber; Heinz Günthardt / Jakob Hlasek	6; 4	3; 6	7^{11} 6^{9}	7^{7} 6^{2}
4	(Czechoslovakia) (Switzerland)	Miloslav Mečíř; Marc Rosset	6^{5} 7^{7}	6; 1	6; 3
5	(Czechoslovakia) (Switzerland)	Milan Šrejber; Jakob Hlasek	3; 6	6; 4	7; 5

=== United States vs. Mexico ===
United States
4
La Costa Resort Hotel, Carlsbad, CA, United States
2–4 February 1990
Hard

Mexico
0

			1	2	3	4	5
1	(United States) (Mexico)	Jay Berger; Jorge Lozano	6^{5} 7^{7}	6; 4	6; 3	6; 3
2	(United States) (Mexico)	Brad Gilbert; Leonardo Lavalle	6; 3	6; 1	7^{10} 6^{8}
3	(United States) (Mexico)	Rick Leach / Jim Pugh; Leonardo Lavalle / Jorge Lozano	6; 4	6^{4} 7^{7}	7; 5	6; 1
4	(United States) (Mexico)	Brad Gilbert; Jorge Lozano	4; 6	6; 2	6; 3
5	(United States) (Mexico)	Jay Berger; Leonardo Lavalle	6; 4	1; 2				not completed

=== Spain vs. Austria ===
Spain
2
Real Club de Tenis Barcelona, Barcelona, Spain
2–4 February 1990
Clay

Austria
3

			1	2	3	4	5
1	(Spain) (Austria)	Emilio Sánchez; Thomas Muster	6; 1	2; 6	6; 4	3; 6	4; 6
2	(Spain) (Austria)	Sergi Bruguera; Horst Skoff	4; 6	5; 7	0; 6
3	(Spain) (Austria)	Sergio Casal / Emilio Sánchez; Alex Antonitsch / Thomas Muster	1; 6	6; 3	7^{7} 6^{5}	6; 4
4	(Spain) (Austria)	Sergi Bruguera; Thomas Muster	5; 7	1; 6	6^{2} 7^{7}
5	(Spain) (Austria)	Emilio Sánchez; Horst Skoff	6; 3	6; 3

=== Italy vs. Sweden ===
Italy
3
Tennis Club Cagliari, Cagliari, Italy
2–5 February 1990
Clay

Sweden
2

			1	2	3	4	5
1	(Italy) (Sweden)	Paolo Canè; Jonas Svensson	3; 6	2; 6	6; 3	6; 3	6; 1
2	(Italy) (Sweden)	Omar Camporese; Mats Wilander	4; 6	4; 6	7; 5	7^{7} 6^{1}	4; 6
3	(Italy) (Sweden)	Paolo Canè / Diego Nargiso; Jan Gunnarsson / Anders Järryd	7; 5	6; 1	7; 5
4	(Italy) (Sweden)	Omar Camporese; Jonas Svensson	7^{7} 6^{2}	1; 6	3; 6	1; 6
5	(Italy) (Sweden)	Paolo Canè; Mats Wilander	6; 4	3; 6	4; 6	7; 5	7; 5

== Quarterfinals ==
=== Argentina vs. West Germany ===
Argentina
3
Buenos Aires Lawn Tennis Club, Buenos Aires, Argentina
30 March–2 April 1990
Clay

West Germany
2

			1	2	3	4	5
1	(Argentina) (West Germany)	Alberto Mancini; Jens Wöhrmann	7; 5	4; 6	7^{7} 6^{2}	7^{7} 6^{2}
2	(Argentina) (West Germany)	Martín Jaite; Carl-Uwe Steeb	3; 6	7^{7} 6^{5}	4; 6	3; 6
3	(Argentina) (West Germany)	Javier Frana / Gustavo Luza; Eric Jelen / Michael Stich	2; 6	6^{5} 7^{7}	2; 6
4	(Argentina) (West Germany)	Martín Jaite; Michael Stich	4; 6	6; 4	6; 1	1; 6	6; 3
5	(Argentina) (West Germany)	Alberto Mancini; Carl-Uwe Steeb	7^{8} 6^{6}	6; 3	6; 4

=== Australia vs. New Zealand ===
Australia
3
Milton Courts, Brisbane, Australia
30 March–1 April 1990
Grass

New Zealand
2

			1	2	3	4	5
1	(Australia) (New Zealand)	John Fitzgerald; Brett Steven	6; 1	6; 0	3; 6	4; 6	2; 6
2	(Australia) (New Zealand)	Wally Masur; Kelly Evernden	6; 3	7^{7} 6^{0}	6; 1
3	(Australia) (New Zealand)	Darren Cahill / Mark Kratzmann; Kelly Evernden / David Lewis	7; 5	6; 3	7^{7} 6^{4}
4	(Australia) (New Zealand)	Wally Masur; Brett Steven	7; 5	6; 2	6; 4
5	(Australia) (New Zealand)	John Fitzgerald; Kelly Evernden	5; 7	7^{10} 6^{8}	1; 6

=== Czechoslovakia vs. United States ===
Czechoslovakia
1
Sportovní hala, Prague, Czechoslovakia
30 March–1 April 1990
Carpet (indoors)

United States
4

			1	2	3	4	5
1	(Czechoslovakia) (United States)	Milan Šrejber; Aaron Krickstein	6; 4	6^{5} 7^{7}	6^{5} 7^{7}	7^{7} 6^{4}	3; 6
2	(Czechoslovakia) (United States)	Petr Korda; Brad Gilbert	6; 2	6; 3	6; 3
3	(Czechoslovakia) (United States)	Petr Korda / Milan Šrejber; Rick Leach / Jim Pugh	4; 6	4; 6	4; 6
4	(Czechoslovakia) (United States)	Petr Korda; Aaron Krickstein	2; 6	3; 6	6; 1	3; 6
5	(Czechoslovakia) (United States)	Karel Nováček; Brad Gilbert	2; 6	1; 6

=== Austria vs. Italy ===
Austria
5
Ferry-Dusika-Hallenstadion, Vienna, Austria
30 March–1 April 1990
Clay (indoors)

Italy
0

			1	2	3	4	5
1	(Austria) (Italy)	Horst Skoff; Diego Nargiso	6; 0	6; 0	6; 2
2	(Austria) (Italy)	Thomas Muster; Paolo Canè	7; 5	7; 5	1; 6	4; 6	6; 3
3	(Austria) (Italy)	Alex Antonitsch / Thomas Muster; Paolo Canè / Diego Nargiso	7^{7} 6^{4}	1; 6	6; 2	6; 2
4	(Austria) (Italy)	Horst Skoff; Claudio Pistolesi	6; 4	6; 1
5	(Austria) (Italy)	Thomas Muster; Diego Nargiso	6; 3	6; 2

== Semifinals ==
=== Australia vs. Argentina ===
Australia
5
White City Stadium, Sydney, Australia
21–23 September 1990
Grass

Argentina
0

			1	2	3	4	5
1	(Australia) (Argentina)	Pat Cash; Alberto Mancini	6; 1	6; 1	6; 2
2	(Australia) (Argentina)	Wally Masur; Martín Jaite	3; 6	6^{4} 7^{7}	6; 4	6; 0	6; 2
3	(Australia) (Argentina)	Darren Cahill / Mark Kratzmann; Javier Frana / Christian Miniussi	3; 6	7^{7} 6^{5}	7^{8} 6^{6}	4; 6	15; 13
4	(Australia) (Argentina)	Pat Cash; Martín Jaite	7; 5	6; 2
5	(Australia) (Argentina)	Wally Masur; Javier Frana	6; 2	6; 2

=== Austria vs. United States ===
Austria
2
Praterstadion, Vienna, Austria
21–24 September 1990
Clay

United States
3

			1	2	3	4	5
1	(Austria) (United States)	Thomas Muster; Michael Chang	4; 6	6; 2	6; 2	6; 4
2	(Austria) (United States)	Horst Skoff; Andre Agassi	6^{3} 7^{7}	0; 6	1; 6
3	(Austria) (United States)	Alex Antonitsch / Thomas Muster; Rick Leach / Jim Pugh	6^{4} 7^{7}	6; 3	0; 6	5; 7
4	(Austria) (United States)	Thomas Muster; Andre Agassi	6; 2	6; 2	7^{7} 6^{2}
5	(Austria) (United States)	Horst Skoff; Michael Chang	6; 3	7^{7} 6^{4}	4; 6	4; 6	3; 6

== Final ==
=== United States vs. Australia ===
United States
3
Florida Suncoast Dome, St. Petersburg, FL, United States
30 November–2 December 1990
Clay (indoors)

Australia
2

			1	2	3	4	5
1	(United States) (Australia)	Andre Agassi; Richard Fromberg	4; 6	6; 2	4; 6	6; 2	6; 4
2	(United States) (Australia)	Michael Chang; Darren Cahill	6; 2	7^{7} 6^{4}	6; 0
3	(United States) (Australia)	Rick Leach / Jim Pugh; Pat Cash / John Fitzgerald	6; 4	6; 2	3; 6	7^{7} 6^{2}
4	(United States) (Australia)	Andre Agassi; Darren Cahill	4; 6	6; 4				retired
5	(United States) (Australia)	Michael Chang; Richard Fromberg	5; 7	6; 2	3; 6
