= 1990 KAL Cup Korea Open – Doubles =

Doubles
- 1990 KAL Cup Korea Open

Final
- Champions: (Canada) Grant Connell (Canada) Glenn Michibata
- Runners-up: (Australia) Jason Stoltenberg (Australia) Todd Woodbridge
- Score: 7–6, 6–4

Details
- Draw: 16
- Seeds: 4

Events
| Singles | Doubles |
| ← 1989 · | KAL Cup Korea Open | · 1991 → |

Scott Davis and Paul Wekesa were the defending champions, but did not participate this year.

Grant Connell and Glenn Michibata won in the final 7–6, 6–4 against Jason Stoltenberg and Todd Woodbridge.

== Seeds ==
1. (Canada) Grant Connell / (Canada) Glenn Michibata (champions)
2. (United States) Kelly Jones / (United States) Robert Van't Hof (quarterfinals)
3. (Austria) Alex Antonitsch / (Netherlands) Tom Nijssen (semifinals)
4. (New Zealand) Kelly Evernden / (Venezuela) Nicolás Pereira (semifinals)

== Draw ==
=== Key ===
- Q = Qualifier
- WC = Wild card
- LL = Lucky loser
- Alt = Alternate
- SE = Special exempt
- PR = Protected ranking
- ITF = ITF entry
- JE = Junior exempt
- w/o = Walkover
- r = Retired
- d = Defaulted
- SR = Special ranking

=== Draw ===
First round
1 | (Canada) G Connell (Canada) G Michibata | 6 | 6
(New Zealand) D Lewis (United States) J Russell | 3 | 4
(United States) D Cassidy (Germany) C Saceanu | 4 | 3
(United Kingdom) N Brown (United Kingdom) A Castle | 6 | 6
4 | (New Zealand) K Evernden (Venezuela) N Pereira | 6 | 6 | 6
(United States) S Cannon (United States) B Garnett | 7 | 3 | 4
(United States) K Kinnear (United States) B Pearce | 6 | 6
(Puerto Rico) M Nido (United States) J Rive | 4 | 3
(United States) J Canter (New Zealand) B Derlin | 4 | 7 | 6
(United States) T Nelson (The Bahamas) R Smith | 6 | 6 | 4
(South Korea) N-J Bae (South Korea) B-S Kim | 2 | 6
3 | (Austria) A Antonitsch (Netherlands) T Nijssen | 6 | 7
Q | (United States) R Matuszewski (United States) L Shiras | 6 | 1 | 6
(Australia) J Stoltenberg (Australia) T Woodbridge | 4 | 6 | 7
(Australia) P Cash (Australia) W Masur | 6 | 4 | 4
2 | (United States) K Jones (United States) R Van't Hof | 2 | 6 | 6

Quarterfinals
1 | (Canada) G Connell (Canada) G Michibata | 6 | 6
(United Kingdom) N Brown (United Kingdom) A Castle | 4 | 3
4 | (New Zealand) K Evernden (Venezuela) N Pereira | 6 | 6
(United States) K Kinnear (United States) B Pearce | 2 | 2
(United States) J Canter (New Zealand) B Derlin | 6 | 6 | 4
3 | (Austria) A Antonitsch (Netherlands) T Nijssen | 4 | 7 | 6
(Australia) J Stoltenberg (Australia) T Woodbridge | 5 | 6 | 7
2 | (United States) K Jones (United States) R Van't Hof | 7 | 3 | 6

Semifinals
1 | (Canada) G Connell (Canada) G Michibata | 6 | 5 | 6
4 | (New Zealand) K Evernden (Venezuela) N Pereira | 4 | 7 | 4
3 | (Austria) A Antonitsch (Netherlands) T Nijssen | 1 | 6 | 6
(Australia) J Stoltenberg (Australia) T Woodbridge | 6 | 3 | 7

Final
1 | (Canada) G Connell (Canada) G Michibata | 7 | 6
(Australia) J Stoltenberg (Australia) T Woodbridge | 6 | 4
