= 1991 KAL Cup Korea Open – Singles =

Singles
- 1991 KAL Cup Korea Open

Final
- Champion: (Germany) Patrick Baur
- Runner-up: (United States) Jeff Tarango
- Score: 6–4, 1–6, 7–6^{(7–5)}

Details
- Draw: 32
- Seeds: 8

Events
Singles	Doubles
← 1990 ·	KAL Cup Korea Open	· 1992 →

Alex Antonitsch was the defending champion, but he lost in the quarterfinals this year.

Patrick Baur won the tournament, beating Jeff Tarango in the final, 6–4, 1–6, 7–6^{(7–5)}.

== Seeds ==
1. (Netherlands) Jan Siemerink (semifinals)
2. (Austria) Alex Antonitsch (semifinals)
3. (United States) Jim Grabb (first round)
4. (Netherlands) Richard Krajicek (quarterfinals)
5. (Germany) Alexander Mronz (first round)
6. (Israel) Gilad Bloom (semifinals)
7. (Canada) Grant Connell (first round)
8. (Germany) Patrik Kühnen (first round)

== Draw ==
=== Key ===
- Q = Qualifier
- WC = Wild card
- LL = Lucky loser
- Alt = Alternate
- SE = Special exempt
- PR = Protected ranking
- ITF = ITF entry
- JE = Junior exempt
- w/o = Walkover
- r = Retired
- d = Defaulted
- SR = Special ranking

=== Finals ===
Semifinals
(Japan) Shuzo Matsuoka	6^{6}	2
(Germany) Patrick Baur	7^{8}	6
(United States) Jeff Tarango	2	7	6
(Mexico) Luis Herrera	6	5	3

Final
(Germany) Patrick Baur	6	1	7^{7}
(United States) Jeff Tarango	4	6	6^{5}

=== Top half ===
First round
1	(Netherlands) J Siemerink	6	2	6
Q	(United Kingdom) N Brown	4	6	2
(Germany) K Braasch	6	6
(Canada) A Sznajder	1	1
Q	(Soviet Union) Ģ Dzelde	6	6
Q	(Kenya) P Wekesa	4	4
(Japan) S Matsuoka	7	4	6
8	(Germany) P Kühnen	5	6	2
4	(Netherlands) R Krajicek	6	6
(Sweden) J Apell	1	4
(Belgium) E Masso	6	1	3
(United States) D Goldie	2	6	6
(United States) S Melville	6	7
(Australia) S Stolle	1	5
(Germany) P Baur	7^{7}	6
5	(Germany) A Mronz	6^{3}	0

Second round
1	(Netherlands) J Siemerink	3	7^{7}	6
(Germany) K Braasch	6	6^{3}	3
Q	(Soviet Union) Ģ Dzelde	2	1
(Japan) S Matsuoka	6	6
4	(Netherlands) R Krajicek	7^{8}	6
(United States) D Goldie	6^{6}	0
(United States) S Melville	2	1
(Germany) P Baur	6	6

Quarterfinals
1	(Netherlands) J Siemerink	6	2	4
(Japan) S Matsuoka	4	6	6
4	(Netherlands) R Krajicek	5	7^{9}	2
(Germany) P Baur	7	6^{7}	6

Semifinals
(Japan) S Matsuoka	6^{6}	2
(Germany) P Baur	7^{8}	6

=== Bottom half ===
First round
6	(Israel) G Bloom	6	6
(Czechoslovakia) M Šrejber	0	1
WC	(South Korea) J-s Kim	6	0	1
WC	(South Korea) E-j Chang	3	6	6
(New Zealand) K Evernden	4	4
(United States) J Tarango	6	6
WC	(South Korea) S-h Ji	7^{7}	5	6
3	(United States) J Grabb	6^{4}	7	4
7	(Canada) G Connell	4	6	6^{5}
(United States) B Shelton	6	1	7^{7}
(Netherlands) J Eltingh	7	3	3
(Mexico) L Herrera	5	6	6
LL	(Netherlands) M Oosting	1	6	6
Q	(South Korea) H-c Shin	6	3	4
(United States) B Garrow	0	4
2	(Austria) A Antonitsch	6	6

Second round
6	(Israel) G Bloom	6	6
WC	(South Korea) E-j Chang	4	1
(United States) J Tarango	2	6	6
WC	(South Korea) S-h Ji	6	2	1
(United States) B Shelton	3	3
(Mexico) L Herrera	6	6
LL	(Netherlands) M Oosting	0	2
2	(Austria) A Antonitsch	6	6

Quarterfinals
6	(Israel) G Bloom	1	6^{6}
(United States) J Tarango	6	7^{8}
(Mexico) L Herrera	6	6
2	(Austria) A Antonitsch	1	2

Semifinals
(United States) J Tarango	2	7	6
(Mexico) L Herrera	6	5	3
