= 1992 Seoul Open – Doubles =

Doubles
- 1992 Seoul Open

Final
- Champions: (United States) Kevin Curren (South Africa) Gary Muller
- Runners-up: (New Zealand) Kelly Evernden (United States) Brad Pearce
- Score: 7–6, 6–4

Details
- Draw: 16
- Seeds: 4

Events
Singles	Doubles
- Seoul Open

Alex Antonitsch and Gilad Bloom were the defending champions, but did not participate this year.

Kevin Curren and Gary Muller won in the final 7–6, 6–4, against Kelly Evernden and Brad Pearce.

== Seeds ==
1. (United States) Kevin Curren / (South Africa) Gary Muller (champions)
2. (Australia) John Fitzgerald / (Sweden) Henrik Holm (first round)
3. (Australia) Neil Borwick / (Australia) Simon Youl (quarterfinals)
4. (Zimbabwe) Byron Black / (South Africa) Byron Talbot (first round)

== Draw ==
Key

- Q = Qualifier
- WC = Wild card
- LL = Lucky loser
- Alt = Alternate
- ITF = ITF entry
- PR = Protected ranking
- SR = Special ranking
- SE = Special exempt
- JE = Junior exempt
- JR = Junior Accelerator Programme entrant
- CO = College Accelerator Programme entrant
- NG = Next Gen Accelerator Program entrant
- w/o = Walkover
- r = Retired
- d = Defaulted

=== Draw ===
First round
1	(United States) K Curren (South Africa) G Muller	7	6
(Australia) A Kratzmann (Australia) M Kratzmann	5	4
(South Korea) E-j Chang (South Korea) C-w Kim	7	6
(South Korea) J-s Kim (South Korea) S-h Ji	6	2
3	(Australia) N Borwick (Australia) S Youl	6	6
(Nigeria) N Odizor (Netherlands) M Schapers	3	3
(Germany) P Kühnen (Germany) A Mronz	6	6
(United States) D Eisenman (Brazil) D Marcelino	4	3
Q	(Germany) P Baur (Germany) C Saceanu	6	6
(Canada) G Connell (Canada) C Pridham	3	2
(New Zealand) K Evernden (United States) B Pearce	6	3	6
4	(Zimbabwe) B Black (South Africa) B Talbot	3	6	2
(United Kingdom) N Broad (South Africa) J-L de Jager	2	6	3
(Czechoslovakia) M Damm (Australia) S Stolle	6	4	6
(Australia) B Dyke (Sweden) P Lundgren	6	6
2	(Australia) J Fitzgerald (Sweden) H Holm	2	2

Quarterfinals
1	(United States) K Curren (South Africa) G Muller	7	6
(South Korea) E-j Chang (South Korea) C-w Kim	6	4
3	(Australia) N Borwick (Australia) S Youl	5	4
(Germany) P Kühnen (Germany) A Mronz	7	6
Q	(Germany) P Baur (Germany) C Saceanu	6	3	4
(New Zealand) K Evernden (United States) B Pearce	3	6	6
(Czechoslovakia) M Damm (Australia) S Stolle	7	4	6
(Australia) B Dyke (Sweden) P Lundgren	5	6	0

Semifinals
1	(United States) K Curren (South Africa) G Muller	4	6	6
(Germany) P Kühnen (Germany) A Mronz	6	3	2
(New Zealand) K Evernden (United States) B Pearce	7	6
(Czechoslovakia) M Damm (Australia) S Stolle	5	3

Final
1	(United States) K Curren (South Africa) G Muller	7	6
(New Zealand) K Evernden (United States) B Pearce	6	4
