= 1993 CA-TennisTrophy – Singles =

Singles
- 1993 CA-TennisTrophy

Final
- Champion: (Croatia) Goran Ivanišević
- Runner-up: (Austria) Thomas Muster
- Score: 4–6, 6–4, 6–4, 7–6^{(7–3)}

Details
- Draw: 32
- Seeds: 8

Events
Singles	Doubles
← 1992 ·	Vienna Open	· 1994 →

Petr Korda was the defending champion but lost in the semifinals to Goran Ivanišević.

Ivanišević won in the final 4–6, 6–4, 6–4, 7–6^{(7–3)} against Thomas Muster.

== Seeds ==
1. (Austria) Thomas Muster (final)
2. (Croatia) Goran Ivanišević (champion)
3. (Czech Republic) Petr Korda (semifinals)
4. (Russia) Alexander Volkov (first round)
5. (Czech Republic) Karel Nováček (first round)
6. (Switzerland) Marc Rosset (quarterfinals)
7. (Israel) Amos Mansdorf (second round)
8. (United States) MaliVai Washington (second round)

== Draw ==
=== Key ===
- Q = Qualifier
- WC = Wild card
- LL = Lucky loser
- Alt = Alternate
- SE = Special exempt
- PR = Protected ranking
- ITF = ITF entry
- JE = Junior exempt
- w/o = Walkover
- r = Retired
- d = Defaulted
- SR = Special ranking

=== Final ===
Semifinals
1	(Austria) Thomas Muster	6	6
(Sweden) Thomas Enqvist	2	4
3	(Czech Republic) Petr Korda	4	2
WC/2	(Croatia) Goran Ivanišević	6	6

Final
1	(Austria) Thomas Muster	6	4	4	6^{3}
WC/2	(Croatia) Goran Ivanišević	4	6	6	7^{7}

=== Section 1 ===
First round
1	(Austria) T Muster	6	6
(Germany) C Arriens	1	1
Q	(Sweden) N Kulti	7^{7}	7^{7}
(Germany) M-K Goellner	6^{4}	6^{2}
(Italy) G Pozzi	6	5	3
(Netherlands) J Siemerink	4	7	6
(United States) A Krickstein	3	1^{r}
7	(Israel) A Mansdorf	6	2
4	(Russia) A Volkov	7^{7}	2	5
(Sweden) T Enqvist	6^{5}	6	7
(Denmark) K Carlsen	4	7	6
(Bulgaria) M Velev	6	5	1
(Austria) H Skoff	5	0
(Australia) J Stoltenberg	7	6
(United States) R Reneberg	6	6
5	(Czech Republic) K Nováček	1	2

Second round
1	(Austria) T Muster	7^{7}	7
Q	(Sweden) N Kulti	6^{5}	5
(Netherlands) J Siemerink	3	7^{7}	7^{7}
7	(Israel) A Mansdorf	6	6^{3}	6^{4}
(Sweden) T Enqvist	6	3	7
(Denmark) K Carlsen	3	6	5
(Australia) J Stoltenberg	3	3
(United States) R Reneberg	6	6

Quarterfinals
1	(Austria) T Muster	5
(Netherlands) J Siemerink	2^{r}
(Sweden) T Enqvist	6	6
(United States) R Reneberg	2	3

Semifinals
1	(Austria) T Muster	6	6
(Sweden) T Enqvist	2	4

=== Section 2 ===
First round
6	(Switzerland) M Rosset	7^{7}	6
Q	(Hungary) S Noszály	6^{4}	3
Q	(Ukraine) D Poliakov	6	7
(France) F Santoro	4	5
(Germany) B Karbacher	6^{9}	3
(Germany) D Prinosil	7^{11}	6
Q	(Germany) R Kroll	4	1
3	(Czech Republic) P Korda	6	6
8	(United States) M Washington	7	6
(United States) J Stark	5	2
(Zimbabwe) B Black	7^{7}	6
(Austria) A Antonitsch	6^{5}	0
WC	(Austria) T Přerovsky	2	6	5
WC	(Austria) T Buchmayer	6	3	7
(Italy) A Gaudenzi	1	3
WC/2	(Croatia) G Ivanišević	6	6

Second round
6	(Switzerland) M Rosset	6	6
Q	(Ukraine) D Poliakov	1	1
(Germany) D Prinosil	6	4	1
3	(Czech Republic) P Korda	0	6	6
8	(United States) M Washington	6^{1}	4
(Zimbabwe) B Black	7^{7}	6
WC	(Austria) T Buchmayer	3	4
WC/2	(Croatia) G Ivanišević	6	6

Quarterfinals
6	(Switzerland) M Rosset
3	(Czech Republic) P Korda	w/o
(Zimbabwe) B Black	2	1
WC/2	(Croatia) G Ivanišević	6	6

Semifinals
3	(Czech Republic) P Korda	4	2
WC/2	(Croatia) G Ivanišević	6	6
