= 1987 Seiko Super Tennis Hong Kong – Singles =

Singles
- 1987 Seiko Super Tennis Hong Kong

Final
- Champion: (United States) Eliot Teltscher
- Runner-up: (Australia) John Fitzgerald
- Score: 6–7^{(6–8)}, 3–6, 6–1, 6–2, 7–5

Details
- Draw: 32 (2WC/4Q/1LL)
- Seeds: 8

Events
Singles	Doubles
← 1986 ·	Hong Kong Open	· 1990 →

Ramesh Krishnan was the defending champion, but was forced to retire in his second round match against Rick Leach.

Eliot Teltscher won the title by defeating John Fitzgerald 6–7^{(6–8)}, 3–6, 6–1, 6–2, 7–5 in the final.

== Seeds ==
1. (United States) David Pate (first round)
2. (Socialist Federal Republic of Yugoslavia) Slobodan Živojinović (second round)
3. (United States) Eliot Teltscher (champion)
4. (New Zealand) Kelly Evernden (second round)
5. (India) Ramesh Krishnan (second round, retired)
6. (United States) Jim Pugh (second round)
7. (South Africa) Gary Muller (second round)
8. (United States) Jim Grabb (first round)

== Draw ==
=== Key ===
- Q = Qualifier
- WC = Wild card
- LL = Lucky loser
- Alt = Alternate
- SE = Special exempt
- PR = Protected ranking
- ITF = ITF entry
- JE = Junior exempt
- w/o = Walkover
- r = Retired
- d = Defaulted
- SR = Special ranking

=== Finals ===
Semifinals
(United Kingdom) Jeremy Bates	3	4
(Australia) John Fitzgerald	6	6
3/WC	(United States) Eliot Teltscher	7	6
(Australia) Darren Cahill	5	0

Final
(Australia) John Fitzgerald	7^{8}	6	1	2	5
3/WC	(United States) Eliot Teltscher	6^{6}	3	6	6	7

=== Top half ===
First round
1	(United States) D Pate	6	3	3
(United States) J Rive	3	6	6
(Australia) M Kratzmann	6	5	3
(United Kingdom) J Bates	2	7	6
(Sweden) J Carlsson	2	7	4
(United States) M Davis	6	6	6
(Netherlands) T Nijssen	4	6	6
8	(United States) J Grabb	6	3	4
4	(New Zealand) K Evernden	6	4	6
(United States) J Canter	3	6	1
(United Kingdom) A Castle	2	6	5
(West Germany) C Saceanu	6	4	7
(Australia) B Drewett	2	6	4
(Australia) J Fitzgerald	6	1	6
Q	(United States) S DeVries	1	7	1
6	(United States) J Pugh	6	6	6

Second round
(United States) J Rive	7	4	4
(United Kingdom) J Bates	5	6	6
(United States) M Davis	6	5
(Netherlands) T Nijssen	7	7
4	(New Zealand) K Evernden	4	4
(West Germany) C Saceanu	6	6
(Australia) J Fitzgerald	6	7
6	(United States) J Pugh	1	6

Quarterfinals
(United Kingdom) J Bates	6	6
(Netherlands) T Nijssen	4	4
(West Germany) C Saceanu	1	6	2
(Australia) J Fitzgerald	6	4	6

Semifinals
(United Kingdom) J Bates	3	4
(Australia) J Fitzgerald	6	6

=== Bottom half ===
First round
5	(India) R Krishnan	6	7
LL	(United States) J Levine	2	6
(West Germany) W Popp	2	2
(United States) R Leach	6	6
Q	(Canada) G Michibata	2	4
(Australia) B Dyke	6	6
Q	(United States) P Chamberlin	6	6	3
3/WC	(United States) E Teltscher	7	4	6
7	(South Africa) G Muller	6	1	6
Q	(Mexico) L Lavalle	1	6	3
(Nigeria) T Mmoh	6	2
(Australia) D Cahill	7	6
(United States) J Ross	0	7	7
(Australia) S Youl	6	6	6
(West Germany) D Keretić	4	6
2/WC	(Socialist Federal Republic of Yugoslavia) S Živojinović	6	7

Second round
5	(India) R Krishnan	3^{r}
(United States) R Leach	4
(Australia) B Dyke	4	6	3
3/WC	(United States) E Teltscher	6	3	6
7	(South Africa) G Muller	4	6
(Australia) D Cahill	6	7
(United States) J Ross	7	3	6
2/WC	(Socialist Federal Republic of Yugoslavia) S Živojinović	6	6	4

Quarterfinals
(United States) R Leach	6	2	3
3/WC	(United States) E Teltscher	4	6	6
(Australia) D Cahill	6	4	6
(United States) J Ross	4	6	4

Semifinals
3/WC	(United States) E Teltscher	7	6
(Australia) D Cahill	5	0
