= 1989 Seoul Open – Singles =

Singles
- 1989 Seoul Open

Final
- Champion: (United States) Robert Van't Hof
- Runner-up: (Australia) Brad Drewett
- Score: 7–5, 6–4

Details
- Draw: 32
- Seeds: 8

Events
Singles	Doubles
← 1988 ·	Seoul Open	· 1990 →

Dan Goldie was the defending champion but did not compete that year.

Robert Van't Hof won in the final 7–5, 6–4 against Brad Drewett.

== Seeds ==
1. (Australia) John Fitzgerald (semifinals)
2. (New Zealand) Kelly Evernden (semifinals)
3. (United States) Scott Davis (first round)
4. (Finland) Olli Rahnasto (first round)
5. (United States) Glenn Layendecker (first round)
6. (Australia) Brad Drewett (final)
7. (United States) Paul Chamberlin (quarterfinals)
8. (West Germany) Christian Saceanu (first round)

== Draw ==
=== Key ===
- Q = Qualifier
- WC = Wild card
- LL = Lucky loser
- Alt = Alternate
- SE = Special exempt
- PR = Protected ranking
- ITF = ITF entry
- JE = Junior exempt
- w/o = Walkover
- r = Retired
- d = Defaulted
- SR = Special ranking

=== Finals ===
Semifinals
1	(Australia) John Fitzgerald	2	2
Q	(United States) Robert Van't Hof	6	6
6	(Australia) Brad Drewett	6	7	6
2	(New Zealand) Kelly Evernden	7	6	3

Final
Q	(United States) Robert Van't Hof	7	6
6	(Australia) Brad Drewett	5	4

=== Top half ===
First round
1	(Australia) J Fitzgerald	7	6
(United Kingdom) J Goodall	6	0
WC	(South Korea) J-S Yoo	2	6	7
(Australia) B Dyke	6	1	6
(Sweden) T Svantesson	4	6	2
(France) J-P Fleurian	6	3	6
(United States) M Anger	7	7
8	(West Germany) C Saceanu	6	6
3	(United States) S Davis	4	4
(Sweden) T Nydahl	6	6
(United Kingdom) A Castle	3	6	6
Q	(United States) R Van't Hof	6	4	7
WC	(South Korea) B-S Kim	7	7
(Kenya) P Wekesa	6	5
(United States) L Shiras	7	3	6
5	(United States) G Layendecker	6	6	1

Second round
1	(Australia) J Fitzgerald	7	7
WC	(South Korea) J-S Yoo	6	5
(France) J-P Fleurian	6	7
(United States) M Anger	3	5
(Sweden) T Nydahl	7	6	6
Q	(United States) R Van't Hof	5	7	7
WC	(South Korea) B-S Kim	6	6	6
(United States) L Shiras	4	7	1

Quarterfinals
1	(Australia) J Fitzgerald	6	3	6
(France) J-P Fleurian	2	6	3
Q	(United States) R Van't Hof	6	6
WC	(South Korea) B-S Kim	3	4

Semifinals
1	(Australia) J Fitzgerald	2	2
Q	(United States) R Van't Hof	6	6

=== Bottom half ===
First round
6	(Australia) B Drewett	7	6
Q	(United States) L Scott	5	4
(Sweden) J Carlsson	3	2
(New Zealand) S Guy	6	6
(India) V Amritraj	6	6
(Italy) G Pozzi	3	3
(Venezuela) N Pereira	6	6
4	(Finland) O Rahnasto	3	4
7	(United States) P Chamberlin	7	6
(Senegal) Y Doumbia	5	2
(Australia) M Kratzmann	6	6
Q	(South Korea) Yoong M-k	1	2
Q	(United Kingdom) J Bates	2	2
(United States) J Canter	6	6
WC	(South Korea) Roh G-t	3	4
2	(New Zealand) K Evernden	6	6

Second round
6	(Australia) B Drewett	6	6
(New Zealand) S Guy	4	4
(India) V Amritraj	6	6
(Venezuela) N Pereira	3	2
7	(United States) P Chamberlin	6	7
(Australia) M Kratzmann	1	5
(United States) J Canter	3	2
2	(New Zealand) K Evernden	6	6

Quarterfinals
6	(Australia) B Drewett	6	7	7
(India) V Amritraj	7	5	6
7	(United States) P Chamberlin	6	6	5
2	(New Zealand) K Evernden	4	7	7

Semifinals
6	(Australia) B Drewett	6	7	6
2	(New Zealand) K Evernden	7	6	3
