= 1992 Seoul Open – Singles =

Singles
- 1992 Seoul Open

Final
- Champion: (Japan) Shuzo Matsuoka
- Runner-up: (Australia) Todd Woodbridge
- Score: 6–3, 4–6, 7–5

Details
- Draw: 32
- Seeds: 8

Events
Singles	Doubles
- Seoul Open

Patrick Baur was the defending champion, but lost in the second round this year.

Shuzo Matsuoka won the tournament, beating Todd Woodbridge in the final, 6–3, 4–6, 7–5.

== Seeds ==
1. (Italy) Gianluca Pozzi (semifinals)
2. (Netherlands) Michiel Schapers (first round)
3. (Australia) Todd Woodbridge (final)
4. (Australia) Simon Youl (first round)
5. (Japan) Shuzo Matsuoka (champion)
6. (Canada) Chris Pridham (first round)
7. (Canada) Grant Connell (first round)
8. (Zimbabwe) Byron Black (second round)

== Draw ==
Key

- Q = Qualifier
- WC = Wild card
- LL = Lucky loser
- Alt = Alternate
- ITF = ITF entry
- PR = Protected ranking
- SR = Special ranking
- SE = Special exempt
- JE = Junior exempt
- JR = Junior Accelerator Programme entrant
- CO = College Accelerator Programme entrant
- NG = Next Gen Accelerator Program entrant
- w/o = Walkover
- r = Retired
- d = Defaulted

=== Finals ===
Semifinals
1	(Italy) Gianluca Pozzi	2	4
5	(Japan) Shuzo Matsuoka	6	6
3	(Australia) Todd Woodbridge	6	6
(Germany) Patrik Kühnen	4	1

Final
5	(Japan) Shuzo Matsuoka	6	4	7
3	(Australia) Todd Woodbridge	3	6	5

=== Top half ===
First round
1	(Italy) G Pozzi	3	7	6
(New Zealand) K Evernden	6	5	3
(South Africa) M Ondruska	4	2
(Germany) P Baur	6	6
Q	(South Korea) H-k Song	1	3
(Australia) J Fitzgerald	6	6
WC	(South Korea) S-h Ji	2	6^{3}
8	(Zimbabwe) B Black	6	7^{7}
4	(Australia) S Youl	6	4	6^{8}
(Brazil) D Marcelino	3	6	7^{10}
(France) G Raoux	6	6
(Australia) N Borwick	1	1
(Australia) S Stolle	6	6
(Czechoslovakia) M Damm	3	2
(Sweden) H Holm	6^{2}	3
5	(Japan) S Matsuoka	7^{7}	6

Second round
1	(Italy) G Pozzi	3	6	7
(Germany) P Baur	6	4	5
(Australia) J Fitzgerald	7	6
8	(Zimbabwe) B Black	5	2
(Brazil) D Marcelino	4	0
(France) G Raoux	6	6
(Australia) S Stolle	4	4
5	(Japan) S Matsuoka	6	6

Quarterfinals
1	(Italy) G Pozzi	6	6
(Australia) J Fitzgerald	4	4
(France) G Raoux	3	1
5	(Japan) S Matsuoka	6	6

Semifinals
1	(Italy) G Pozzi	2	4
5	(Japan) S Matsuoka	6	6

=== Bottom half ===
First round
6	(Canada) C Pridham	4	2
(Germany) A Mronz	6	6
(United States) K Curren	4	6	3
Q	(South Korea) C-w Kim	6	4	6
WC	(South Korea) J-s Kim	3	3
WC	(South Korea) E-J Chang	6	6
(Germany) C Saceanu	4	1
3	(Australia) T Woodbridge	6	6
7	(Canada) G Connell	6	1	6^{4}
(Sweden) P Lundgren	3	6	7^{7}
(Germany) P Kühnen	6	6
Q	(Romania) A Pavel	3	3
(Sweden) T Högstedt	6	6^{6}	6
Q	(United States) B Pearce	3	7^{8}	2
(South Africa) G Muller	7^{7}	6
2	(Netherlands) M Schapers	6^{5}	3

Second round
(Germany) A Mronz	6	6
Q	(South Korea) C-w Kim	3	3
WC	(South Korea) E-J Chang	6	4	5
3	(Australia) T Woodbridge	2	6	7
(Sweden) P Lundgren	3	6^{4}
(Germany) P Kühnen	6	7^{7}
(Sweden) T Högstedt	3	4
(South Africa) G Muller	6	6

Quarterfinals
(Germany) A Mronz	2	1
3	(Australia) T Woodbridge	6	6
(Germany) P Kühnen	6	6
(South Africa) G Muller	2	3

Semifinals
3	(Australia) T Woodbridge	6	6
(Germany) P Kühnen	4	1
