= 1987 Seiko Super Tennis Hong Kong – Doubles =

Doubles
- 1987 Seiko Super Tennis Hong Kong

Final
- Champions: (Australia) Mark Kratzmann (United States) Jim Pugh
- Runners-up: (United States) Marty Davis (Australia) Brad Drewett
- Score: 6–7, 6–4, 6–2

Details
- Draw: 16 (1WC)
- Seeds: 4

Events
Singles	Doubles
← 1986 ·	Hong Kong Open	· 1990 →

Mike De Palmer and Gary Donnelly were the defending champions, but none competed this year.

Mark Kratzmann and Jim Pugh won the title by defeating Marty Davis and Brad Drewett 6–7, 6–4, 6–2 in the final.

== Seeds ==
1. (United States) Rick Leach / (United States) Tim Pawsat (semifinals)
2. (Australia) Mark Kratzmann / (United States) Jim Pugh (champions)
3. (South Africa) Gary Muller / (Australia) Simon Youl (first round)
4. (Australia) Broderick Dyke / (Netherlands) Tom Nijssen (quarterfinals)

== Draw ==
=== Key ===
- Q = Qualifier
- WC = Wild card
- LL = Lucky loser
- Alt = Alternate
- SE = Special exempt
- PR = Protected ranking
- ITF = ITF entry
- JE = Junior exempt
- w/o = Walkover
- r = Retired
- d = Defaulted
- SR = Special ranking

=== Draw ===
First round
1	(United States) R Leach (United States) T Pawsat	6	6
(West Germany) D Keretić (United States) E Teltscher	3	4
(West Germany) J Becka (United States) B Buffington	6	7
(United States) R Baxter (United States) J Ross	4	6
4	(Australia) B Dyke (Netherlands) T Nijssen	6	7
(United States) P Chamberlin (United States) J Levine	3	6
(Canada) G Michibata (United States) T Siegel	3	6	6
(United States) M Davis (Australia) B Drewett	6	3	7
(West Germany) W Popp (Netherlands) H van Boeckel	6	6
WC	(Hong Kong) Mark Bailey (United States) M Grant	1	2
(United Kingdom) J Bates (United Kingdom) A Castle	5	7	6
3	(South Africa) G Muller (Australia) S Youl	7	5	0
(New Zealand) S Guy (Nigeria) T Mmoh	2	4
(Mexico) L Lavalle (West Germany) C Saceanu	6	6
(United States) J Canter (United States) S DeVries	1	2
2	(Australia) M Kratzmann (United States) J Pugh	6	6

Quarterfinals
1	(United States) R Leach (United States) T Pawsat	6	6
(West Germany) J Becka (United States) B Buffington	2	4
4	(Australia) B Dyke (Netherlands) T Nijssen	5	6	1
(United States) M Davis (Australia) B Drewett	7	4	6
(West Germany) W Popp (Netherlands) H van Boeckel	7	6	5
(United Kingdom) J Bates (United Kingdom) A Castle	6	7	7
(Mexico) L Lavalle (West Germany) C Saceanu	3	4
2	(Australia) M Kratzmann (United States) J Pugh	6	6

Semifinals
1	(United States) R Leach (United States) T Pawsat	7	4	4
(United States) M Davis (Australia) B Drewett	6	6	6
(United Kingdom) J Bates (United Kingdom) A Castle	3	7	2
2	(Australia) M Kratzmann (United States) J Pugh	6	5	6

Final
(United States) M Davis (Australia) B Drewett	7	4	2
2	(Australia) M Kratzmann (United States) J Pugh	6	6	6
