= 1989 Seoul Open – Doubles =

Doubles
- 1989 Seoul Open

Final
- Champions: (United States) Scott Davis (Kenya) Paul Wekesa
- Runners-up: (United States) John Letts (United States) Bruce Man-Son-Hing
- Score: 6–2, 6–4

Details
- Draw: 16
- Seeds: 4

Events
Singles	Doubles
← 1988 ·	Seoul Open	· 1990 →

Andrew Castle and Roberto Saad were the defending champions but only Castle competed that year with Robert Van't Hof.

Castle and Van't Hof lost in the quarterfinals to Scott Davis and Paul Wekesa.

Davis and Wekesa won in the final 6–2, 6–4 against John Letts and Bruce Man-Son-Hing.

== Seeds ==
1. (Australia) Brad Drewett / (Australia) John Fitzgerald (first round)
2. (United Kingdom) Andrew Castle / (United States) Robert Van't Hof (quarterfinals)
3. (Australia) Mark Kratzmann / (United States) Glenn Layendecker (first round)
4. (Australia) Broderick Dyke / (Sweden) Tobias Svantesson (first round)

== Draw ==
=== Key ===
- Q = Qualifier
- WC = Wild card
- LL = Lucky loser
- Alt = Alternate
- ITF = ITF entry
- PR = Protected ranking
- SR = Special ranking
- SE = Special exempt
- JE = Junior exempt
- JR = Junior Accelerator Programme entrant
- CO = College Accelerator Programme entrant
- NG = Next Gen Accelerator Program entrant
- w/o = Walkover
- r = Retired
- d = Defaulted

First round
1	(Australia) B Drewett (Australia) J Fitzgerald	6	6	6
(Sweden) T Nydahl (Finland) O Rahnasto	1	7	7
(United Kingdom) J Goodall (United States) J Russell	3	7	3
(United States) J Canter (Venezuela) N Pereira	6	6	6
4	(Australia) B Dyke (Sweden) T Svantesson	6	3	3
(United States) J Letts (United States) B Man-Son-Hing	2	6	6
(South Korea) B-S Kim (South Korea) J-S Yoo	3	4
(United States) P Chamberlin (West Germany) C Saceanu	6	6
(New Zealand) S Guy (United States) L Scott	2	4
(United States) M Anger (New Zealand) K Evernden	6	6
(Senegal) Y Doumbia (France) J-P Fleurian	6	6
3	(Australia) M Kratzmann (United States) G Layendecker	4	4
(United Kingdom) J Bates (United States) L Shiras	6	2	3
(United States) S Davis (Kenya) P Wekesa	2	6	6
(United States) R Baxter (India) M Ferreira	6	3	2
2	(United Kingdom) A Castle (United States) R Van't Hof	4	6	6

Quarterfinals
(Sweden) T Nydahl (Finland) O Rahnasto	3	6	4
(United States) J Canter (Venezuela) N Pereira	6	3	6
(United States) J Letts (United States) B Man-Son-Hing	3	6	6
(United States) P Chamberlin (West Germany) C Saceanu	6	4	1
(United States) M Anger (New Zealand) K Evernden	4	6	5
(Senegal) Y Doumbia (France) J-P Fleurian	6	3	7
(United States) S Davis (Kenya) P Wekesa	7	6	6
2	(United Kingdom) A Castle (United States) R Van't Hof	6	7	4

Semifinals
(United States) J Canter (Venezuela) N Pereira	6	5	3
(United States) J Letts (United States) B Man-Son-Hing	3	7	6
(Senegal) Y Doumbia (France) J-P Fleurian	2	4
(United States) S Davis (Kenya) P Wekesa	6	6

Final
(United States) J Letts (United States) B Man-Son-Hing	2	4
(United States) S Davis (Kenya) P Wekesa	6	6
