= 1990 Davis Cup World Group qualifying round =

Tennis tournament

The 1990 Davis Cup World Group qualifying round was held from 21 to 23 September. They were the main play-offs of the 1990 Davis Cup. The winners of the playoffs advanced to the 1991 Davis Cup World Group, and the losers were relegated to their respective Zonal Regions I.

== Teams ==
Bold indicates team had qualified for the 1991 Davis Cup World Group.

From World Group

- **Argentina**
- **Australia**
- **Israel**
- **Italy**
- **Mexico**
- Netherlands
- **New Zealand**
- Switzerland

From Americas Group I

- **Canada**
- Uruguay

From Asia/Oceania Group I

- China
- South Korea

From Europe/Africa Group I

- **Belgium**
- Finland
- Great Britain
- Soviet Union

== Results summary ==
Date: 21–23 September

The eight losing teams in the World Group first round ties and eight winners of the Zonal Group I final round ties competed in the World Group qualifying round for spots in the 1991 World Group.

Home team	Score	Visiting team	Location	Venue	Door	Surface	Ref.
**Belgium**	4–1	South Korea	Brussels	Royal Léopold Club	Outdoor	Clay	
**Israel**	5–0	China	Ramat HaSharon	Canada Stadium	Outdoor	Hard	
**Canada**	3–2	Netherlands	Toronto	National Tennis Centre	Outdoor	Hard	
Soviet Union	1–4	**Spain**	Moscow	Lenin Central Stadium	Indoor	Carpet	
**Sweden**	5–0	Finland	Västerås	Rocklundahallen	Indoor	Carpet	
Great Britain	0–5	**France**	London	Queen's Club	Outdoor	Grass	
**Mexico**	5–0	Uruguay	Mexico City	Club Alemán de México	Outdoor	Hard	
**Yugoslavia**	3–2	Switzerland	Split	Športski centar Gripe	Indoor	Clay	

- France, Israel, Mexico, Spain, Sweden and Yugoslavia remain in the World Group in 1991.
- Belgium and Canada are promoted to the World Group in 1991.
- China, Finland, Great Britain, South Korea, Soviet Union and Uruguay remain in Zonal Group I in 1991.
- Netherlands and Switzerland are relegated to Zonal Group I in 1991.

== Qualifying results ==
=== Belgium vs. South Korea ===
Belgium
4
Royal Léopold Club, Brussels, Belgium
24–26 August 1990
Clay

South Korea
1

			1	2	3	4	5
1	(Belgium) (South Korea)	**Bart Wuyts**; Bae Nam-ju	3; **6**	3; **6**	**6**; 0	**6**; 1	**6**; 2
2	(Belgium) (South Korea)	**Eduardo Masso**; Kim Jae-sik	**6**; 3	**6**; 1	**6**; 3
3	(Belgium) (South Korea)	Xavier Daufresne / Eduardo Masso; **Kim Jae-sik / Yoo Jin-sun**	6^{2} **7^{7}**	**6**; 2	3; **6**	4; **6**
4	(Belgium) (South Korea)	**Eduardo Masso**; Bae Nam-ju	**6**; 4	**6**; 1	**6**; 1
5	(Belgium) (South Korea)	**Bart Wuyts**; Kim Jae-sik	**7**; 5	**6**; 4

=== Israel vs. China ===
Israel
5
Canada Stadium, Ramat HaSharon, Israel
13–15 September 1990
Hard

China
0

			1	2	3	4	5
1	(Israel) (China)	**Amos Mansdorf**; Liu Xiaocheng	**6**; 4	**6**; 2	**6**; 0
2	(Israel) (China)	**Gilad Bloom**; Lin Di	**6**; 1	**6**; 0	**6**; 1
3	(Israel) (China)	**Amos Mansdorf / Shahar Perkiss**; Liu Xiaocheng / Zhang Jiaheng	**6**; 4	**6**; 4	**7**; 5
4	(Israel) (China)	**Gilad Bloom**; Liu Xiaocheng	**6**; 3	**6**; 1
5	(Israel) (China)	**Raviv Weidenfeld**; Lin Di	**6**; 3	**6**; 3

=== Canada vs. Netherlands ===
Canada
3
National Tennis Centre, Toronto, Canada
21–23 September 1990
Hard

Netherlands
2

			1	2	3	4	5
1	(Canada) (Netherlands)	Chris Pridham; **Mark Koevermans**	6^{5} **7^{7}**	4; **6**	3; **6**
2	(Canada) (Netherlands)	**Grant Connell**; Paul Haarhuis	**7^{7}** 6^{4}	**6**; 4	**6**; 4
3	(Canada) (Netherlands)	**Grant Connell / Glenn Michibata**; Paul Haarhuis / Mark Koevermans	**7^{7}** 6^{5}	**7^{7}** 6^{5}	**6**; 2
4	(Canada) (Netherlands)	Chris Pridham; **Paul Haarhuis**	**6**; 4	3; **6**	0; **6**	5; **7**
5	(Canada) (Netherlands)	**Grant Connell**; Mark Koevermans	**7^{7}** 6^{5}	**7^{7}** 6^{5}	**6**; 3

=== Soviet Union vs. Spain ===
Soviet Union
1
Lenin Central Stadium, Moscow, Soviet Union
21–23 September 1990
Carpet (indoors)

Spain
4

			1	2	3	4	5
1	(Soviet Union) (Spain)	Andrei Chesnokov; **Sergi Bruguera**	2; **6**	**7^{8}** 6^{6}	2; **6**	3; **6**
2	(Soviet Union) (Spain)	Andrei Cherkasov; **Emilio Sánchez**	3; **6**	**7^{9}** 6^{7}	3; **6**	4; **6**
3	(Soviet Union) (Spain)	Vladimir Gabrichidze / Alexander Volkov; **Sergio Casal / Emilio Sánchez**	**6**; 4	3; **6**	3; **6**	**6**; 4	3; **6**
4	(Soviet Union) (Spain)	**Andrei Cherkasov**; Sergi Bruguera	**6**; 4	**7^{9}** 6^{7}
5	(Soviet Union) (Spain)	Andrei Chesnokov; **Emilio Sánchez**	6^{3} **7^{7}**	5; **7**

=== Sweden vs. Finland ===
Sweden
5
Rocklundahallen, Västerås, Sweden
21–23 September 1990
Carpet (indoors)

Finland
0

			1	2	3	4	5
1	(Sweden) (Finland)	**Stefan Edberg**; Aki Rahunen	**6**; 1	**6**; 1	**7^{7}** 6^{5}
2	(Sweden) (Finland)	**Jonas Svensson**; Veli Paloheimo	**6**; 1	**6**; 1	**6**; 1
3	(Sweden) (Finland)	**Stefan Edberg / Peter Lundgren**; Veli Paloheimo / Olli Rahnasto	**6**; 2	**6**; 1	**6**; 2
4	(Sweden) (Finland)	**Stefan Edberg**; Veli Paloheimo	3; **6**	**6**; 4	**6**; 0
5	(Sweden) (Finland)	**Jonas Svensson**; Aki Rahunen	**6**; 4	**6**; 0

=== Great Britain vs. France ===
Great Britain
0
Queen's Club, London, United Kingdom
21–23 September 1990
Grass

France
5

			1	2	3	4	5
1	(United Kingdom) (France)	Nick Brown; **Henri Leconte**	3; **6**	6^{5} **7^{7}**	2; **6**
2	(United Kingdom) (France)	Jeremy Bates; **Guy Forget**	**6**; 2	6^{5} **7^{7}**	4; **6**	1; **6**
3	(United Kingdom) (France)	Jeremy Bates / Andrew Castle; **Guy Forget / Henri Leconte**	1; **6**	4; **6**	4; **6**
4	(United Kingdom) (France)	Jeremy Bates; **Henri Leconte**	6^{5} **7^{7}**	0; **6**
5	(United Kingdom) (France)	Nick Brown; **Guy Forget**	3; **6**	2; **6**

=== Mexico vs. Uruguay ===
Mexico
5
Club Alemán de México, Mexico City, Mexico
21–23 September 1990
Hard

Uruguay
0

			1	2	3	4	5
1	(Mexico) (Uruguay)	**Leonardo Lavalle**; Diego Pérez	6^{2} **7^{7}**	**6**; 2	4; **6**	**6**; 3	**6**; 2
2	(Mexico) (Uruguay)	**Jorge Lozano**; Marcelo Filippini	**6**; 4	**6**; 4	**6**; 2
3	(Mexico) (Uruguay)	**Luis Herrera / Jorge Lozano**; Marcelo Filippini / Diego Pérez	**6**; 4	**7^{7}** 6^{2}	4; **6**	**7**; 5
4	(Mexico) (Uruguay)	**Jorge Lozano**; Victor Caldarelli	3; **6**	**6**; 3	**6**; 1
5	(Mexico) (Uruguay)	**Oliver Fernández**; Marcelo Filippini	**7**; 5	**6**; 3

=== Yugoslavia vs. Switzerland ===
Yugoslavia
3
Športski centar Gripe, Split, Yugoslavia
21–23 September 1990
Clay (indoors)

Switzerland
2

			1	2	3	4	5
1	(Socialist Federal Republic of Yugoslavia) (Switzerland)	**Goran Ivanišević**; Marc Rosset	**6**; 4	4; **6**	6^{2} **7^{7}**	**6**; 3	**6**; 2
2	(Socialist Federal Republic of Yugoslavia) (Switzerland)	Goran Prpić; **Jakob Hlasek**	**6**; 3	4; **6**	6^{3} **7^{7}**	4; **6**
3	(Socialist Federal Republic of Yugoslavia) (Switzerland)	**Goran Ivanišević / Goran Prpić**; Jakob Hlasek / Marc Rosset	3; **6**	**6**; 3	**6**; 4	**6**; 2
4	(Socialist Federal Republic of Yugoslavia) (Switzerland)	**Goran Ivanišević**; Claudio Mezzadri	**6**; 1	**6**; 4	**6**; 2
5	(Socialist Federal Republic of Yugoslavia) (Switzerland)	Goran Prpić; **Marc Rosset**	4; **6**	6^{2} **7^{7}**
