= 1991 Salem Open – Singles =

Singles
- 1991 Salem Open

Final
- Champion: (Netherlands) Richard Krajicek
- Runner-up: (Australia) Wally Masur
- Score: 6–2, 3–6, 6–3

Details
- Draw: 32 (3WC/4Q/1LL)
- Seeds: 8

Events
Singles	Doubles
← 1990 ·	Hong Kong Open	· 1992 →

Pat Cash was the defending champion, but did not compete this year.

Richard Krajicek won the title by defeating Wally Masur 6–2, 3–6, 6–3 in the final.

== Seeds ==
1. (United States) Michael Chang (quarterfinals)
2. (United States) John McEnroe (firstround)
3. (Germany) Michael Stich (first round)
4. (Switzerland) Jakob Hlasek (first round)
5. (United States) Aaron Krickstein (first round)
6. (Sweden) Anders Järryd (second round, retired)
7. (Israel) Amos Mansdorf (second round)
8. (Australia) Todd Woodbridge (first round)

== Draw ==
=== Key ===
- Q = Qualifier
- WC = Wild card
- LL = Lucky loser
- Alt = Alternate
- SE = Special exempt
- PR = Protected ranking
- ITF = ITF entry
- JE = Junior exempt
- w/o = Walkover
- r = Retired
- d = Defaulted
- SR = Special ranking

=== Finals ===
Semifinals
(South Africa) Gary Muller	2	4
(Netherlands) Richard Krajicek	6	6
(Australia) Wally Masur	4	7^{7}	6
(Austria) Alex Antonitsch	6	6^{2}	3

Final
(Netherlands) Richard Krajicek	6	3	6
(Australia) Wally Masur	2	6	3

=== Top half ===
First round
1	(United States) M Chang	6	6
(United States) K Jones	2	3
(South Africa) C van Rensburg	6	5	7
(India) R Krishnan	2	7	5
(South Africa) G Muller	6	6
(Peru) J Yzaga	3	4
WC	(United States) T Ho	6	6
8	(Australia) T Woodbridge	4	2
3	(Germany) M Stich	5	4
(Belgium) E Masso	7	6
(Netherlands) R Krajicek	6	6^{8}	6
LL	(Australia) N Borwick	4	7^{10}	3
(Germany) P Kühnen	6	6
Q	(United States) J Stimpson	4	4
(Germany) U Riglewski	2	1
6	(Sweden) A Järryd	6	6

Second round
1	(United States) M Chang	7	6^{5}	6
(South Africa) C van Rensburg	5	7^{7}	4
(South Africa) G Muller	6	1	6
WC	(United States) T Ho	1	6	3
(Belgium) E Masso	1	3
(Netherlands) R Krajicek	6	6
(Germany) P Kühnen	7^{7}	1
6	(Sweden) A Järryd	6^{5}	0^{r}

Quarterfinals
1	(United States) M Chang	7	3	6^{1}
(South Africa) G Muller	5	6	7^{7}
(Netherlands) R Krajicek	7^{8}	2	6
(Germany) P Kühnen	6^{6}	6	1

Semifinals
(South Africa) G Muller	2	4
(Netherlands) R Krajicek	6	6

=== Bottom half ===
First round
5	(United States) A Krickstein	6^{4}	1
(United States) K Curren	7^{7}	6
WC	(Philippines) F Barrientos	6	6
Q	(United Kingdom) N Brown	1	4
Q	(Canada) G Michibata	1	7^{7}	6
(Australia) M Kratzmann	6	6^{5}	2
(Australia) W Masur	6	7^{8}
4	(Switzerland) J Hlasek	4	6^{6}
7	(Israel) A Mansdorf	6	6^{3}	6
Q	(Italy) G Pozzi	3	7^{7}	4
(Germany) A Mronz	6	6
WC	(Hong Kong) M Walker	3	3
(France) G Raoux	4	6	5
(Austria) A Antonitsch	6	4	7
(United States) T Witsken	6	5	7^{7}
2	(United States) J McEnroe	3	7	6^{3}

Second round
(United States) K Curren	6	1	5
WC	(Philippines) F Barrientos	1	6	7
Q	(Canada) G Michibata	3	2
(Australia) W Masur	6	6
7	(Israel) A Mansdorf	7^{7}	4	2
(Germany) A Mronz	6^{4}	6	6
(Austria) A Antonitsch	6	7^{7}
(United States) T Witsken	1	6^{3}

Quarterfinals
WC	(Philippines) F Barrientos	0	1
(Australia) W Masur	6	6
(Germany) A Mronz	6	3	4
(Austria) A Antonitsch	3	6	6

Semifinals
(Australia) W Masur	4	7^{7}	6
(Austria) A Antonitsch	6	6^{2}	3
