= 1987 Seiko Super Tennis Hong Kong =

- Date: 26 October – 1 November
- Edition: 15th
- Category: Grand Prix
- Draw: 32S / 16D
- Prize money: $200,000
- Surface: Hard / indoor
- Location: Hong Kong

Champions

Singles
- (United States) Eliot Teltscher

Doubles
- (Australia) Mark Kratzmann / (United States) Jim Pugh
← 1986 ·	Hong Kong Open	· 1990 →

The 1987 Seiko Super Tennis Hong Kong, also known as the Hong Kong Open, was a men's tennis tournament played on indoor hard courts at the Victoria Park Tennis Centre in Hong Kong that was part of the 1987 Nabisco Grand Prix tennis circuit. It was the 15th edition of the tournament and was held from 26 October through 1 November 1987. Third-seeded Eliot Teltscher, who entered the main draw via a wildcard, won the singles title.

== Finals ==
=== Singles ===
(United States) Eliot Teltscher defeated (Australia) John Fitzgerald 6–7^{(6–8)}, 3–6, 6–1, 6–2, 7–5

- It was Teltscher's only singles title of the year and the 10th and last of his career.

=== Doubles ===
(Australia) Mark Kratzmann / (United States) Jim Pugh defeated (United States) Marty Davis / (Australia) Brad Drewett 6–7, 6–4, 6–2

- It was Kratzmann's 2nd and last doubles title of the year and the 3rd of his career. It was Pugh's 3rd and last doubles title of the year and of his career.
