= 1993 CA-TennisTrophy – Doubles =

Doubles
- 1993 CA-TennisTrophy

Final
- Champions: (Zimbabwe) Byron Black (United States) Jonathan Stark
- Runners-up: (United States) Mike Bauer (Germany) David Prinosil
- Score: 6–3, 7–6

Details
- Draw: 16
- Seeds: 4

Events
Singles	Doubles
← 1992 ·	Vienna Open	· 1994 →

Ronnie Båthman and Anders Järryd were the defending champions but did not compete that year.

Byron Black and Jonathan Stark won in the final 6–3, 7–6 against Mike Bauer and David Prinosil.

== Seeds ==
1. (Zimbabwe) Byron Black / (United States) Jonathan Stark (champions)
2. (United States) Scott Davis / (United States) Richey Reneberg (first round)
3. (United States) Mike Bauer / (Germany) David Prinosil (final)
4. (Czech Republic) Karel Nováček / (Australia) Jason Stoltenberg (first round)

== Draw ==
=== Key ===
- Q = Qualifier
- WC = Wild card
- LL = Lucky loser
- Alt = Alternate
- SE = Special exempt
- PR = Protected ranking
- ITF = ITF entry
- JE = Junior exempt
- w/o = Walkover
- r = Retired
- d = Defaulted
- SR = Special ranking

First round
1	(Zimbabwe) B Black (United States) J Stark	6	6
(Netherlands) S Groen (Netherlands) J Siemerink	3	3
(United States) M Briggs (United States) T Kronemann	4	5
(Germany) M-K Goellner (Germany) C Saceanu	6	7
4	(Czech Republic) K Nováček (Australia) J Stoltenberg	6	4
Q	(Czech Republic) V Flegl (Germany) B Karbacher	7	6
(United States) D Eisenman (United States) D Johnson	3	6
(United Kingdom) N Broad (United States) G Van Emburgh	6	7
(Switzerland) M Rosset (United States) J Sullivan	2	6
(South Africa) J de Beer (South Africa) B Talbot	6	7
LL	(Latvia) Ģ Dzelde (Ukraine) D Poliakov	4	7	3
3	(United States) M Bauer (Germany) D Prinosil	6	6	6
(South Africa) M Barnard (South Africa) R Deppe	3	4
WC	(Austria) A Antonitsch (Austria) H Skoff	6	6
(United States) B Garnett (United States) T.J. Middleton	7	6	7
2	(United States) S Davis (United States) R Reneberg	6	7	5

Quarterfinals
1	(Zimbabwe) B Black (United States) J Stark	6	7
(Germany) M-K Goellner (Germany) C Saceanu	4	5
Q	(Czech Republic) V Flegl (Germany) B Karbacher	6	3	2
(United Kingdom) N Broad (United States) G Van Emburgh	4	6	6
(South Africa) J de Beer (South Africa) B Talbot	7	6	6
3	(United States) M Bauer (Germany) D Prinosil	6	7	7
WC	(Austria) A Antonitsch (Austria) H Skoff	6	7
(United States) B Garnett (United States) T.J. Middleton	4	6

Semifinals
1	(Zimbabwe) B Black (United States) J Stark	6	7
(United Kingdom) N Broad (United States) G Van Emburgh	2	5
3	(United States) M Bauer (Germany) D Prinosil	6	5	6
WC	(Austria) A Antonitsch (Austria) H Skoff	3	7	2

Final
1	(Zimbabwe) B Black (United States) J Stark	6	7
3	(United States) M Bauer (Germany) D Prinosil	3	6
