= 1991 Salem Open – Doubles =

Doubles
- 1991 Salem Open

Final
- Champions: (United States) Patrick Galbraith (United States) Todd Witsken
- Runners-up: (Canada) Glenn Michibata (United States) Robert Van't Hof
- Score: 6–2, 6–4

Details
- Draw: 32 (3WC/4Q/1LL)
- Seeds: 8

Events
| Singles | Doubles |
- Hong Kong Open

Pat Cash and Wally Masur were the defending champions, but Cash did not compete this year. Masur teamed up with Todd Woodbridge and lost in the quarterfinals to John McEnroe and Gary Muller.

Patrick Galbraith and Todd Witsken won the title by defeating Glenn Michibata and Robert Van't Hof 6–2, 6–4 in the final.

== Seeds ==
1. (Germany) Udo Riglewski / (Germany) Michael Stich (semifinals)
2. (United States) Patrick Galbraith / (United States) Todd Witsken (champions)
3. (Australia) Wally Masur / (Australia) Todd Woodbridge (quarterfinals)
4. (Switzerland) Jakob Hlasek / (Sweden) Anders Järryd (quarterfinals)

== Draw ==
Key

- Q = Qualifier
- WC = Wild card
- LL = Lucky loser
- Alt = Alternate
- ITF = ITF entry
- PR = Protected ranking
- SR = Special ranking
- SE = Special exempt
- JE = Junior exempt
- JR = Junior Accelerator Programme entrant
- CO = College Accelerator Programme entrant
- NG = Next Gen Accelerator Program entrant
- w/o = Walkover
- r = Retired
- d = Defaulted

=== Draw ===
First round
1 | (Germany) U Riglewski (Germany) M Stich | 7 | 6
(New Zealand) K Evernden (New Zealand) S Guy | 6 | 2
(United Kingdom) N Brown (Netherlands) M Oosting | 6 | 4 | 6
(Austria) A Antonitsch (South Africa) B Talbot | 3 | 6 | 7
4 | (Switzerland) J Hlasek (Sweden) A Järryd | 6 | 6
(United Kingdom) J Bates (United Kingdom) A Castle | 3 | 4
(Canada) G Michibata (United States) R Van't Hof | 7 | 5 | 6
(Netherlands) R Krajicek (Australia) M Kratzmann | 6 | 7 | 2
(United States) J McEnroe (South Africa) G Muller | 6 | 3 | 6
(Australia) N Borwick (Italy) G Pozzi | 3 | 6 | 3
Q | (Sweden) J Apell (Sweden) P Nyborg | 6 | 1 | 6
3 | (Australia) W Masur (Australia) T Woodbridge | 3 | 6 | 7
(United States) K Kinnear (United States) S Salumaa | 5 | 4
(United Kingdom) N Broad (United States) K Curren | 7 | 6
(South Africa) S Kruger (South Africa) C van Rensburg | 6 | 2 | 5
2 | (United States) P Galbraith (United States) T Witsken | 3 | 6 | 7

Quarterfinals
1 | (Germany) U Riglewski (Germany) M Stich | 6 | 7
(Austria) A Antonitsch (South Africa) B Talbot | 2 | 5
4 | (Switzerland) J Hlasek (Sweden) A Järryd | 7 | 4 | 6
(Canada) G Michibata (United States) R Van't Hof | 5 | 6 | 7
(United States) J McEnroe (South Africa) G Muller | 3 | 6 | 6
3 | (Australia) W Masur (Australia) T Woodbridge | 6 | 3 | 3
(United Kingdom) N Broad (United States) K Curren | 4 | 7 | 2
2 | (United States) P Galbraith (United States) T Witsken | 6 | 5 | 6

Semifinals
1 | (Germany) U Riglewski (Germany) M Stich | 3 | 6
(Canada) G Michibata (United States) R Van't Hof | 6 | 7
(United States) J McEnroe (South Africa) G Muller | 6 | 3 | 4
2 | (United States) P Galbraith (United States) T Witsken | 3 | 6 | 6

Final
(Canada) G Michibata (United States) R Van't Hof | 2 | 4
2 | (United States) P Galbraith (United States) T Witsken | 6 | 6
