= 1994 CA-TennisTrophy =

- Date: 17–24 October
- Edition: 20th
- Category: World Series
- Draw: 32S / 16D
- Prize money: $375,000
- Surface: Carpet / indoor
- Location: Vienna, Austria
- Venue: Wiener Stadthalle

Champions

Singles
- (United States) Andre Agassi

Doubles
- (United States) Mike Bauer / (Czech Republic) David Rikl
- Vienna Open

The 1994 CA-TennisTrophy was a men's tennis tournament played on indoor carpet courts at the Wiener Stadthalle in Vienna, Austria and was part of the World Series of the 1994 ATP Tour. It was the 20th edition of the tournament and was held from 17 October through 24 October 1994. Third-seeded Andre Agassi won the singles title.

== Finals ==
=== Singles ===
(United States) Andre Agassi defeated (Germany) Michael Stich 7–6^{(7–4)}, 4–6, 6–2, 6–3

- It was Agassi's 4th title of the year and the 24th of his career.

=== Doubles ===
(United States) Mike Bauer / (Czech Republic) David Rikl defeated (Austria) Alex Antonitsch / (Canada) Greg Rusedski 7–6, 6–4

- It was Bauer's only title of the year and the 12th of his career. It was Rikl's 4th title of the year and the 7th of his career.
