= Tennis at the 1990 Asian Games =

- Venue: International Tennis Center
- Dates: 24 September – 5 October 1990

Tennis were contested at the 1990 Asian Games in Beijing International Tennis Center, Beijing, China from September 24 to October 5, 1990.

Tennis had team, doubles, and singles events for both men and women, as well as a mixed doubles competition, a total of seven events.

== Medalists ==
Event	Gold	Silver	Bronze
Men's singles	Pan Bing; China	Zhang Jiuhua; China	Kim Bong-soo; South Korea
Men's singles	Pan Bing; China	Zhang Jiuhua; China	Kim Jae-sik; South Korea
Men's doubles	China; Xia Jiaping; Meng Qianghua	China; Liu Shuhua; Pan Bing	Indonesia; Bonit Wiryawan; Daniel Heryanto
Men's doubles	China; Xia Jiaping; Meng Qianghua	China; Liu Shuhua; Pan Bing	South Korea; Lee Jin-ho; Ji Seung-ho
Men's team	China; Liu Shuhua; Meng Qianghua; Pan Bing; Xia Jiaping	South Korea; Bae Nam-ju; Kim Bong-soo; Kim Jae-sik; Yoo Jin-sun	Indonesia; Daniel Heryanto; Hary Suharyadi; Benny Wijaya; Bonit Wiryawan
Men's team	China; Liu Shuhua; Meng Qianghua; Pan Bing; Xia Jiaping	South Korea; Bae Nam-ju; Kim Bong-soo; Kim Jae-sik; Yoo Jin-sun	India; Zeeshan Ali; Leander Paes; Rohit Rajpal; Srinivasan Vasudevan
Women's singles	Akiko Kijimuta; Japan	Chen Li; China	Kim Il-soon; South Korea
Women's singles	Akiko Kijimuta; Japan	Chen Li; China	Park Mal-sim; South Korea
Women's doubles	Indonesia; Yayuk Basuki; Suzanna Wibowo	South Korea; Lee Jeong-myung; Kim Il-soon	Japan; Nana Miyagi; Akiko Kijimuta
Women's doubles	Indonesia; Yayuk Basuki; Suzanna Wibowo	South Korea; Lee Jeong-myung; Kim Il-soon	Indonesia; Lukky Tedjamukti; Irawati Moerid
Women's team	Japan; Kimiko Date; Akiko Kijimuta; Nana Miyagi; Naoko Sawamatsu	Indonesia; Yayuk Basuki; Irawati Moerid; Lukky Tedjamukti; Suzanna Wibowo	China; Chen Li; Li Fang; Li Yanling; Tang Min
Women's team	Japan; Kimiko Date; Akiko Kijimuta; Nana Miyagi; Naoko Sawamatsu	Indonesia; Yayuk Basuki; Irawati Moerid; Lukky Tedjamukti; Suzanna Wibowo	South Korea; Im Sook-ja; Kim Il-soon; Lee Jeong-myung; Park Mal-sim
Mixed doubles	Indonesia; Hary Suharyadi; Yayuk Basuki	South Korea; Yoo Jin-sun; Kim Il-soon	Indonesia; Bonit Wiryawan; Suzanna Wibowo
Mixed doubles	Indonesia; Hary Suharyadi; Yayuk Basuki	South Korea; Yoo Jin-sun; Kim Il-soon	Thailand; Vittaya Samrej; Orawan Thampensri

== Medal table ==
Rank	Nation	Gold	Silver	Bronze	Total
1	China (CHN)	3	3	1	7
2	Indonesia (INA)	2	1	4	7
3	Japan (JPN)	2	0	1	3
4	South Korea (KOR)	0	3	6	9
5	India (IND)	0	0	1	1
5	Thailand (THA)	0	0	1	1
Totals (6 entries)		7	7	14	28
