= 1991 Davis Cup World Group =

- Date: 1 February – 1 December
- Edition: 11th

Champions
- France
- Davis Cup

The World Group was the highest level of Davis Cup competition in 1991. The first-round losers went into the Davis Cup World Group qualifying round, and the winners progressed to the quarterfinals and were guaranteed a World Group spot for 1992.

France won the title, defeating the United States in the final, 3–1. The final was held at the Palais des Sports de Gerland in Lyon, France, from 29 November to 1 December. It was the French team's 7th Davis Cup title overall and their first since 1932.

The breakup of Yugoslavia during the tournament and the declaration of independence by Croatia in June 1991 resulted in top-ranked Croatian tennis players Goran Ivanišević and Goran Prpić leaving the Yugoslavia Davis Cup team. Yugoslavia were subsequently defeated in their next tie, when lower-ranked Serbian players were called up to fill their absence in the semi-finals against France.

== Participating teams ==
Participating teams
Argentina	Australia	Austria	Belgium
Canada	Czechoslovakia	France	Germany
Israel	Italy	Mexico	New Zealand
Spain	Sweden	United States	Yugoslavia

== Draw ==
First round 1–3 February; 29–31 March
Mexico City, Mexico (hard)
United States	3
Mexico	2
Murcia, Spain (clay)
Spain	4
Canada	1
Christchurch, New Zealand (grass)
Argentina	4
New Zealand	1
Dortmund, Germany (indoor carpet)
Germany	3
Italy	2
Zagreb, Yugoslavia (indoor clay)
Yugoslavia	4
Sweden	1
Prague, Czechoslovakia (indoor carpet)
Czechoslovakia	4
Austria	1
Rennes, France (indoor clay)
Israel	0
France	5
Perth, Australia (grass)
Belgium	0
Australia	5

Quarterfinals; March–June
Newport, RI, United States (grass)
United States	4
Spain	1
Berlin, Germany (indoor carpet)
Argentina	0
Germany	5
Prague, Czechoslovakia (indoor carpet)
Yugoslavia	4
Czechoslovakia	1
Nîmes, France (clay)
France	3
Australia	2

Semifinals; 20–22 September
Kansas City, MO, United States (indoor clay)
United States	3
Germany	2
Pau, France (indoor carpet)
Yugoslavia	0
France	5

Final; 29 November-1 December
Lyon, France (indoor carpet)
United States	1
France	3

== First round ==
=== Mexico vs. United States ===
Mexico
2
Club Alemán de México, Mexico City, Mexico
29–31 March 1991
Hard

United States
3

			1	2	3	4	5
1	(Mexico) (United States)	Luis Herrera; Jim Courier	6; 4	2; 6	7; 5	6; 4
2	(Mexico) (United States)	Leonardo Lavalle; Brad Gilbert	3; 6	2; 6	7^{7} 6^{4}	3; 6
3	(Mexico) (United States)	Leonardo Lavalle / Jorge Lozano; Rick Leach / Jim Pugh	4; 6	6; 4	6^{2} 7^{7}	7^{7} 6^{3}	4; 6
4	(Mexico) (United States)	Luis Herrera; Brad Gilbert	6; 4	3; 6	5; 7	6; 3	3; 6
5	(Mexico) (United States)	Leonardo Lavalle; Jim Courier	6; 4	6^{2} 7^{7}	7; 5

=== Spain vs. Canada ===
Spain
4
La Manga Club, Murcia, Spain
1–3 February 1991
Clay

Canada
1

			1	2	3	4	5
1	(Spain) (Canada)	Sergi Bruguera; Andrew Sznajder	6; 4	6; 2	1; 6	6; 1
2	(Spain) (Canada)	Emilio Sánchez; Martin Wostenholme	6; 3	3; 6	6; 1	6; 4
3	(Spain) (Canada)	Sergio Casal / Emilio Sánchez; Grant Connell / Glenn Michibata	7^{7} 6^{3}	6; 2	6; 1
4	(Spain) (Canada)	Emilio Sánchez; Andrew Sznajder	5; 7	7; 5	3; 6
5	(Spain) (Canada)	Sergi Bruguera; Martin Wostenholme	6; 1	7^{7} 6^{5}

=== New Zealand vs. Argentina ===
New Zealand
1
Wilding Park, Christchurch, New Zealand
1–3 February 1991
Grass

Argentina
4

			1	2	3	4	5
1	(New Zealand) (Argentina)	Brett Steven; Martín Jaite	5; 7	2; 6	2; 6
2	(New Zealand) (Argentina)	Kelly Evernden; Javier Frana	6^{4} 7^{7}	4; 6	3; 6
3	(New Zealand) (Argentina)	Kelly Evernden / David Lewis; Javier Frana / Christian Miniussi	4; 6	6; 3	6^{4} 7^{7}	5; 7
4	(New Zealand) (Argentina)	Kelly Evernden; Christian Miniussi	6^{4} 7^{7}	6; 3	8; 6
5	(New Zealand) (Argentina)	Brett Steven; Javier Frana	3; 6	3; 6

=== Germany vs. Italy ===
Germany
3
Westfalenhallen, Dortmund, Germany
1–3 February 1991
Carpet (indoors)

Italy
2

			1	2	3	4	5
1	(Germany) (Italy)	Boris Becker; Paolo Canè	3; 6	6; 1	6; 4	6; 4
2	(Germany) (Italy)	Michael Stich; Omar Camporese	6^{2} 7^{7}	1; 6	3; 6
3	(Germany) (Italy)	Boris Becker / Eric Jelen; Omar Camporese / Diego Nargiso	6; 4	4; 6	6^{6} 7^{8}	6; 4	3; 6
4	(Germany) (Italy)	Boris Becker; Omar Camporese	3; 6	4; 6	6; 3	6; 4	6; 3
5	(Germany) (Italy)	Michael Stich; Paolo Canè	7^{7} 6^{4}	6^{1} 7^{7}	7; 5	6; 1

=== Yugoslavia vs. Sweden ===
Yugoslavia
4
Košarkaški klub Cibona, Zagreb, Yugoslavia
1–3 February 1991
Clay (indoors)

Sweden
1

			1	2	3	4	5
1	(Socialist Federal Republic of Yugoslavia) (Sweden)	Goran Ivanišević; Jonas Svensson	6; 2	4; 6	6; 3	6; 4
2	(Socialist Federal Republic of Yugoslavia) (Sweden)	Goran Prpić; Stefan Edberg	6; 4	6; 3	6; 2
3	(Socialist Federal Republic of Yugoslavia) (Sweden)	Goran Ivanišević / Goran Prpić; Stefan Edberg / Peter Lundgren	6; 4	6; 4	6; 4
4	(Socialist Federal Republic of Yugoslavia) (Sweden)	Goran Ivanišević; Stefan Edberg	6; 4	6; 2
5	(Socialist Federal Republic of Yugoslavia) (Sweden)	Goran Prpić; Magnus Gustafsson	2; 6	3; 6

=== Czechoslovakia vs. Austria ===
Czechoslovakia
4
Sportovní hala, Prague, Czechoslovakia
1–3 February 1991
Carpet (indoors)

Austria
1

			1	2	3	4	5
1	(Czechoslovakia) (Austria)	Petr Korda; Horst Skoff	6; 3	3; 6	6^{9} 7^{11}	6; 1	6; 3
2	(Czechoslovakia) (Austria)	Karel Nováček; Alex Antonitsch	7^{7} 6^{5}	6; 4	1; 6	1; 6	6; 3
3	(Czechoslovakia) (Austria)	Petr Korda / Milan Šrejber; Alex Antonitsch / Horst Skoff	6; 4	7^{7} 6^{4}	0; 6	6; 4
4	(Czechoslovakia) (Austria)	Karel Nováček; Thomas Buchmayer	6^{7} 7^{9}	5; 7
5	(Czechoslovakia) (Austria)	Milan Šrejber; Alex Antonitsch	7^{7} 6^{5}	7^{7} 6^{3}

=== France vs. Israel ===
France
5
Salle Omnisports, Rennes, France
29–31 March 1991
Clay (indoors)

Israel
0

			1	2	3	4	5
1	(France) (Israel)	Henri Leconte; Amos Mansdorf	6; 3	7^{7} 6^{3}	3; 6	7^{7} 6^{4}
2	(France) (Israel)	Guy Forget; Gilad Bloom	6; 4	6^{5} 7^{7}	6; 2	6; 4
3	(France) (Israel)	Guy Forget / Henri Leconte; Gilad Bloom / Amos Mansdorf	7; 5	6; 4	6; 3
4	(France) (Israel)	Guy Forget; Amos Mansdorf	6; 4	6; 2
5	(France) (Israel)	Henri Leconte; Gilad Bloom	6; 3	7; 5

=== Australia vs. Belgium ===
Australia
5
Royal King's Park Tennis Club, Perth, Australia
1–3 February 1991
Grass

Belgium
0

			1	2	3	4	5
1	(Australia) (Belgium)	Richard Fromberg; Filip Dewulf	6; 4	6; 3	1; 6	6; 4
2	(Australia) (Belgium)	Wally Masur; Eduardo Masso	6; 3	6; 3	6; 1
3	(Australia) (Belgium)	Darren Cahill / Todd Woodbridge; Eduardo Masso / Libor Pimek	6; 3	6; 3	6; 3
4	(Australia) (Belgium)	Richard Fromberg; Eduardo Masso	6; 3	1; 6	6; 3
5	(Australia) (Belgium)	Wally Masur; Filip Dewulf	6; 1	6; 2

== Quarterfinals ==
=== United States vs. Spain ===
United States
4
International Tennis Hall of Fame, Newport, RI, United States
14–16 June 1991
Grass

Spain
1

			1	2	3	4	5
1	(United States) (Spain)	Brad Gilbert; Emilio Sánchez	6; 4	6; 4	6; 2
2	(United States) (Spain)	John McEnroe; Tomás Carbonell	6; 3	6; 2	6; 1
3	(United States) (Spain)	Rick Leach / Jim Pugh; Sergio Casal / Emilio Sánchez	7^{8} 6^{6}	6; 3	7^{7} 6^{3}
4	(United States) (Spain)	John McEnroe; Emilio Sánchez	6; 4	3; 6	6; 3
5	(United States) (Spain)	Rick Leach; Tomás Carbonell	6^{1} 7^{7}	7; 5	4; 6

=== Germany vs. Argentina ===
Germany
5
Deutschlandhalle, Berlin, Germany
30 March–1 April 1991
Carpet (indoors)

Argentina
0

			1	2	3	4	5
1	(Germany) (Argentina)	Michael Stich; Martín Jaite	7; 5	6; 3	6; 4
2	(Germany) (Argentina)	Boris Becker; Javier Frana	6; 3	6; 4	6; 4
3	(Germany) (Argentina)	Eric Jelen / Michael Stich; Javier Frana / Christian Miniussi	7; 5	6^{3} 7^{7}	7^{9} 6^{7}	6^{7} 7^{9}	6; 4
4	(Germany) (Argentina)	Boris Becker; Martín Jaite	6; 1	7^{8} 6^{6}
5	(Germany) (Argentina)	Michael Stich; Javier Frana	6^{10} 7^{12}	6; 1	6; 1

=== Czechoslovakia vs. Yugoslavia ===
Czechoslovakia
1
Sportovní hala, Prague, Czechoslovakia
29–31 March 1991
Carpet (indoors)

Yugoslavia
4

			1	2	3	4	5
1	(Czechoslovakia) (Socialist Federal Republic of Yugoslavia)	Petr Korda; Goran Ivanišević	1; 6	6^{3} 7^{7}	6; 4	1; 6
2	(Czechoslovakia) (Socialist Federal Republic of Yugoslavia)	Karel Nováček; Slobodan Živojinović	6; 1	4; 6	6; 4	7; 5
3	(Czechoslovakia) (Socialist Federal Republic of Yugoslavia)	Petr Korda / Milan Šrejber; Goran Ivanišević / Slobodan Živojinović	6^{5} 7^{7}	4; 6	4; 6
4	(Czechoslovakia) (Socialist Federal Republic of Yugoslavia)	Karel Nováček; Goran Ivanišević	3; 6	6; 3	6^{4} 7^{7}	6; 3	4; 6
5	(Czechoslovakia) (Socialist Federal Republic of Yugoslavia)	Petr Korda; Slobodan Živojinović	6^{6} 7^{8}	6; 2	6; 8

=== France vs. Australia ===
France
3
Arena of Nîmes, Nîmes, France
3–5 May 1991
Clay

Australia
2

			1	2	3	4	5
1	(France) (Australia)	Guy Forget; Wally Masur	6; 3	6; 3	6; 4
2	(France) (Australia)	Fabrice Santoro; Richard Fromberg	3; 6	4; 6	6^{4} 7^{7}
3	(France) (Australia)	Guy Forget / Henri Leconte; Mark Kratzmann / Todd Woodbridge	6^{2} 7^{7}	7; 5	5; 7	7^{7} 6^{2}	6; 4
4	(France) (Australia)	Guy Forget; Richard Fromberg	7^{7} 6^{2}	6^{8} 7^{10}	3; 6	3; 6
5	(France) (Australia)	Fabrice Santoro; Wally Masur	6; 3	6; 4	4; 6	6; 1

== Semifinals ==
=== United States vs. Germany ===
United States
3
Kemper Arena, Kansas City, MO, United States
20–22 September 1991
Clay (indoors)

Germany
2

			1	2	3	4	5
1	(United States) (Germany)	Andre Agassi; Michael Stich	6; 3	6; 1	6; 4
2	(United States) (Germany)	Jim Courier; Carl-Uwe Steeb	4; 6	6; 1	6; 3	6; 4
3	(United States) (Germany)	Scott Davis / David Pate; Eric Jelen / Michael Stich	6^{3} 7^{7}	4; 6	4; 6
4	(United States) (Germany)	Jim Courier; Michael Stich	4; 6	5; 7	4; 6
5	(United States) (Germany)	Andre Agassi; Carl-Uwe Steeb	6; 2	6; 2	6; 3

=== France vs. Yugoslavia ===
France
5
Palais des Sports, Pau, France
20–22 September 1991
Carpet (indoors)

Yugoslavia
0

			1	2	3	4	5
1	(France) (Socialist Federal Republic of Yugoslavia)	Guy Forget; Srđan Muškatirović	6; 2	6; 1	6; 4
2	(France) (Socialist Federal Republic of Yugoslavia)	Fabrice Santoro; Slobodan Živojinović	4; 6	7; 5	7^{7} 6^{0}	3; 6	6; 3
3	(France) (Socialist Federal Republic of Yugoslavia)	Arnaud Boetsch / Guy Forget; Srđan Muškatirović / Slobodan Živojinović	6; 4	6; 3	6; 2
4	(France) (Socialist Federal Republic of Yugoslavia)	Guy Forget; Slobodan Živojinović	6; 1	3; 6	6; 2
5	(France) (Socialist Federal Republic of Yugoslavia)	Fabrice Santoro; Srđan Muškatirović	6^{1} 7^{7}	6; 3	7; 5

== Final ==
=== France vs. United States ===
France
3
Palais des Sports de Gerland, Lyon, France
29 November–1 December 1991
Carpet (indoors)

United States
1

			1	2	3	4	5
1	(France) (United States)	Guy Forget; Andre Agassi	7^{9} 6^{7}	2; 6	1; 6	2; 6
2	(France) (United States)	Henri Leconte; Pete Sampras	6; 4	7; 5	6; 4
3	(France) (United States)	Guy Forget / Henri Leconte; Ken Flach / Robert Seguso	6; 1	6; 4	4; 6	6; 2
4	(France) (United States)	Guy Forget; Pete Sampras	7^{8} 6^{6}	3; 6	6; 3	6; 4
5	(France) (United States)	Henri Leconte; Andre Agassi						not played
