= 1991 Salem Open =

- Date: 1–7 April
- Edition: 16th
- Category: World Series (Free Week)
- Draw: 32S / 16D
- Prize money: $234,000
- Surface: Hard / outdoor
- Location: Hong Kong, Hong Kong

Champions

Singles
- (Netherlands) Richard Krajicek

Doubles
- (United States) Patrick Galbraith / (United States) Todd Witsken
← 1990 ·	Hong Kong Open	· 1992 →

The 1991 Salem Open was a men's tennis tournament played on outdoor hard courts on Hong Kong Island in Hong Kong that was part of the World Series of the 1991 ATP Tour. It was the 16th edition of the tournament and was held from 1 April through 7 April 1991. Unseeded Richard Krajicek won the singles title.

== Finals ==
=== Singles ===
(Netherlands) Richard Krajicek defeated (Australia) Wally Masur 6–2, 3–6, 6–3

- It was Krajicek's only singles title of the year and the first of his career.

=== Doubles ===
(United States) Patrick Galbraith / (United States) Todd Witsken defeated (Canada) Glenn Michibata / (United States) Robert Van't Hof 6–2, 6–4

- It was Galbraith's 2nd doubles title of the year and the 5th of his career. It was Witsken's 1st doubles title of the year and the 9th of his career.
