= 1994 CA-TennisTrophy – Doubles =

Doubles
- 1994 CA-TennisTrophy

Final
- Champions: (United States) Mike Bauer (Czech Republic) David Rikl
- Runners-up: (Austria) Alex Antonitsch (Canada) Greg Rusedski
- Score: 7–6, 6–4

Details
- Draw: 16
- Seeds: 4

Events
Singles	Doubles
← 1993 ·	Vienna Open	· 1995 →

Byron Black and Jonathan Stark were the defending champions but did not compete that year.

Mike Bauer and David Rikl won in the final 7–6, 6–4 against Alex Antonitsch and Greg Rusedski.

== Seeds ==
1. (Australia) John Fitzgerald / (Australia) Mark Woodforde (quarterfinals)
2. (United States) Scott Davis / (Australia) Sandon Stolle (semifinals)
3. (United States) Mike Bauer / (Czech Republic) David Rikl (champions)
4. (United States) Shelby Cannon / (United States) Jim Pugh (first round)

== Draw ==
=== Key ===
- Q = Qualifier
- WC = Wild card
- LL = Lucky loser
- Alt = Alternate
- SE = Special exempt
- PR = Protected ranking
- ITF = ITF entry
- JE = Junior exempt
- w/o = Walkover
- r = Retired
- d = Defaulted
- SR = Special ranking

First round
1	(Australia) J Fitzgerald (Australia) M Woodforde	6	6
(United Kingdom) N Broad (United States) G Van Emburgh	4	4
Q	(Germany) C Saceanu (Germany) A Thoms	3	7	5
(South Africa) E Ferreira (Netherlands) J Siemerink	6	6	7
4	(United States) S Cannon (United States) J Pugh	6	4	6
WC	(Austria) A Antonitsch (Canada) G Rusedski	4	6	7
(Germany) U Riglewski (Germany) M Stich	7	4	6
WC	(Austria) T Buchmayer (Italy) A Gaudenzi	6	6	3
(Mexico) J Lozano (Belgium) L Pimek	5	6	7
(Germany) M-K Goellner (Germany) D Prinosil	7	4	6
(South Africa) M Barnard (South Africa) B Haygarth	6	6
3	(United States) M Bauer (Czech Republic) D Rikl	7	7
(United States) M Keil (South Africa) B Talbot	2	5
WC	(Sweden) J Apell (Sweden) T Enqvist	6	7
(Netherlands) T Kempers (United States) J Waite	2	4
2	(United States) S Davis (Australia) S Stolle	6	6

Quarterfinals
1	(Australia) J Fitzgerald (Australia) M Woodforde	4	6	6
(South Africa) E Ferreira (Netherlands) J Siemerink	6	4	7
WC	(Austria) A Antonitsch (Canada) G Rusedski	7	7
(Germany) U Riglewski (Germany) M Stich	6	5
(Mexico) J Lozano (Belgium) L Pimek	6	6	2
3	(United States) M Bauer (Czech Republic) D Rikl	7	3	6
WC	(Sweden) J Apell (Sweden) T Enqvist	1	6	3
2	(United States) S Davis (Australia) S Stolle	6	3	6

Semifinals
(South Africa) E Ferreira (Netherlands) J Siemerink	3	6
(Austria) A Antonitsch (Canada) G Rusedski	6	7
3	(United States) M Bauer (Czech Republic) D Rikl	6	6	6
2	(United States) S Davis (Australia) S Stolle	7	3	2

Final
WC	(Austria) A Antonitsch (Canada) G Rusedsk	6	4
3	(United States) M Bauer (Czech Republic) D Rikl	7	6
