= 1994 CA-TennisTrophy – Singles =

Singles
- 1994 CA-TennisTrophy

Final
- Champion: (United States) Andre Agassi
- Runner-up: (Germany) Michael Stich
- Score: 7–6^{(7–4)}, 4–6, 6–2, 6–3

Details
- Draw: 32
- Seeds: 8

Events
Singles	Doubles
- Vienna Open

Goran Ivanišević was the defending champion but lost in the semifinals, to Andre Agassi.

Agassi won in the final 7–6^{(7–4)}, 4–6, 6–2, 6–3 against Michael Stich.

== Seeds ==
1. (Croatia) Goran Ivanišević (semifinals)
2. (Germany) Michael Stich (final)
3. (United States) Andre Agassi (champion)
4. (Austria) Thomas Muster (semifinals)
5. (Czech Republic) Petr Korda (quarterfinals)
6. (Italy) Andrea Gaudenzi (quarterfinals)
7. (Czech Republic) Slava Doseděl (first round)
8. (Germany) Bernd Karbacher (first round)

== Draw ==
Key

- Q = Qualifier
- WC = Wild card
- LL = Lucky loser
- Alt = Alternate
- ITF = ITF entry
- PR = Protected ranking
- SR = Special ranking
- SE = Special exempt
- JE = Junior exempt
- JR = Junior Accelerator Programme entrant
- CO = College Accelerator Programme entrant
- NG = Next Gen Accelerator Program entrant
- w/o = Walkover
- r = Retired
- d = Defaulted

=== Final ===
Semifinals
1	(Croatia) Goran Ivanišević	4	4
3	(United States) Andre Agassi	6	6
4	(Austria) Thomas Muster	3	3
2	(Germany) Michael Stich	6	6

Final
3	(United States) Andre Agassi	7^{7}	4	6	6
2	(Germany) Michael Stich	6^{4}	6	2	3

=== Section 1 ===
First round
1	(Croatia) G Ivanišević	6	6
(United States) J Stark	4	2
(Canada) G Rusedski	6	7^{7}
WC	(Austria) W Schranz	3	6^{3}
Q	(Germany) A Thoms	7^{7}	7^{10}
(Australia) W Masur	6^{4}	6^{8}
(Slovakia) K Kučera	6	6
8	(Germany) B Karbacher	4	2
3	(United States) A Agassi	6	6
(United States) C Adams	4	2
(Australia) M Woodforde	4	6	7^{7}
Q	(Germany) C Arriens	6	3	6^{5}
WC	(Austria) R Burtscher	4	3
WC	(Austria) A Antonitsch	6	6
(Brazil) L Mattar	3	1
6	(Italy) A Gaudenzi	6	6

Second round
1	(Croatia) G Ivanišević	7^{7}	7^{11}
(Canada) G Rusedski	6^{3}	6^{9}
Q	(Germany) A Thoms	6	6
(Slovakia) K Kučera	4	2
3	(United States) A Agassi	6	6
(Australia) M Woodforde	0	0
WC	(Austria) A Antonitsch	2	2
6	(Italy) A Gaudenzi	6	6

Quarterfinals
1	(Croatia) G Ivanišević	3	7^{7}	7^{7}
Q	(Germany) A Thoms	6	6^{5}	6^{1}
3	(United States) A Agassi	6	6
6	(Italy) A Gaudenzi	3	1

Semifinals
1	(Croatia) G Ivanišević	4	4
3	(United States) A Agassi	6	6

=== Section 2 ===
First round
5	(Czech Republic) P Korda	6	7^{7}
(Austria) H Skoff	1	6^{4}
(Morocco) Y El Aynaoui	6	6^{4}	4
(Sweden) T Enqvist	4	7^{7}	6
(United States) B Gilbert	6^{9}	6	3
(Czech Republic) D Rikl	7^{11}	4	6
(Israel) A Mansdorf	2	2
4	(Austria) T Muster	6	6
7	(Czech Republic) S Doseděl	6^{2}	2
Q	(Netherlands) J Siemerink	7^{7}	6
(Germany) M-K Goellner	7^{7}	6
Q	(Czech Republic) R Vašek	6^{3}	3
(Sweden) J Apell	3	2
(Germany) K Braasch	6	6
(Russia) A Volkov	2	4
2	(Germany) M Stich	6	6

Second round
5	(Czech Republic) P Korda	6	6
(Sweden) T Enqvist	0	3
(Czech Republic) D Rikl	1	6^{4}
4	(Austria) T Muster	6	7^{7}
Q	(Netherlands) J Siemerink	6	7
(Germany) M-K Goellner	3	5
(Germany) K Braasch	3	4
2	(Germany) M Stich	6	6

Quarterfinals
5	(Czech Republic) P Korda	6^{2}	0
4	(Austria) T Muster	7^{7}	6
Q	(Netherlands) J Siemerink	6	5	5
2	(Germany) M Stich	4	7	7

Semifinals
4	(Austria) T Muster	3	3
2	(Germany) M Stich	6	6
