= Robert Kroll =

German tennis player

- Country (sports): Germany
- Born: 30 December 1972 (age 52); Bucholz, West Germany
- Prize money: $9,680

Singles
- Career record: 0–2
- Highest ranking: No. 441 (9 May 1994)

Doubles
- Highest ranking: No. 479 (15 Nov 1993)

Robert Kroll (born 30 December 1972) is a German former professional tennis player.

Born in Bucholz, a town near Hamburg, Kroll played Bundesliga tennis for Rot-Weiß Hagen and competed briefly on the professional tour in the early 1990s.

Kroll had a career high singles ranking of 441 in the world, with ATP Tour main draw appearances at the 1993 Vienna Open and 1994 German Open (Hamburg), both times as a qualifier.

A former training partner of Martina Hingis, Kroll now runs a laser therapy practice in Hamburg, specialising in the treatment of tinnitus.
