= 1986 Seiko Super Tennis Hong Kong – Singles =

Singles
- 1986 Seiko Super Tennis Hong Kong

Final
- Champion: (India) Ramesh Krishnan
- Runner-up: (Ecuador) Andrés Gómez
- Score: 7–6^{(9–7)}, 6–0, 7–5

Details
- Draw: 32 (2WC/4Q)
- Seeds: 8

Events
Singles	Doubles
← 1985 ·	Hong Kong Open	· 1987 →

Andrés Gómez was the defending champion, but lost in the final to Ramesh Krishnan. The score was 7–6^{(9–7)}, 6–0, 7–5.

== Seeds ==
1. (United States) Jimmy Connors (quarterfinals)
2. (Ecuador) Andrés Gómez (final)
3. (United States) Aaron Krickstein (semifinals)
4. (United States) David Pate (second round)
5. (Soviet Union) Andrei Chesnokov (quarterfinals)
6. (United States) Jonathan Canter (quarterfinals)
7. (India) Ramesh Krishnan (champion)
8. (United States) Paul Annacone (second round)

== Draw ==
=== Key ===
- Q = Qualifier
- WC = Wild card
- LL = Lucky loser
- Alt = Alternate
- SE = Special exempt
- PR = Protected ranking
- ITF = ITF entry
- JE = Junior exempt
- w/o = Walkover
- r = Retired
- d = Defaulted
- SR = Special ranking

=== Finals ===
Semifinals
7	(India) Ramesh Krishnan	6	6
WC	(Australia) Pat Cash	4	2
3	(United States) Aaron Krickstein	4	1
2	(Ecuador) Andrés Gómez	6	6

Final
7	(India) Ramesh Krishnan	7^{9}	6	7
2	(Ecuador) Andrés Gómez	6^{7}	0	5

=== Top half ===
First round
1	(United States) J Connors	6	6
WC	(Japan) S Matsuoka	0	1
(United States) B Schultz	2	7	6
Q	(Australia) B Drewett	6	5	2
Q	(Australia) M Kratzmann	6	6
Q	(West Germany) CU Steeb	3	2
(United States) J Sadri	6	2	1
7	(India) R Krishnan	4	6	6
4	(United States) D Pate	6	3	6
Q	(United States) B Pearce	4	6	3
(United States) J Arias	4	6	3
WC	(Australia) P Cash	6	3	6
(South Africa) E Edwards	2	6
(Peru) J Yzaga	6	7
(Australia) W Masur	3	4
6	(United States) J Canter	6	6

Second round
1	(United States) J Connors	6	6	6
(United States) B Schultz	4	7	1
Q	(Australia) M Kratzmann	4	6	4
7	(India) R Krishnan	6	4	6
4	(United States) D Pate	5	4
WC	(Australia) P Cash	7	6
(Peru) J Yzaga	3	4
6	(United States) J Canter	6	6

Quarterfinals
1	(United States) J Connors	6	3	4
7	(India) R Krishnan	4	6	6
WC	(Australia) P Cash	6	7
6	(United States) J Canter	3	6

Semifinals
7	(India) R Krishnan	6	6
WC	(Australia) P Cash	4	2

=== Bottom half ===
First round
5	(Soviet Union) A Chesnokov	6	6
(United States) G Holmes	4	2
(United States) M Davis	6	6
(South Africa) C van Rensburg	4	1
(United States) M Freeman	6	2	7
(United States) M Leach	4	6	6
(Australia) B Dyke	2	0
3	(United States) A Krickstein	6	6
8	(United States) P Annacone	6	6
(Australia) J Fitzgerald	2	3
(Canada) G Michibata	6	4	1
(United States) S Davis	3	6	6
(United States) G Donnelly	6	7
(West Germany) D Keretić	4	5
(United States) T Witsken	3	6	4
2	(Ecuador) A Gómez	6	4	6

Second round
5	(Soviet Union) A Chesnokov	7	6
(United States) M Davis	6	1
(United States) M Freeman	2	7	3
3	(United States) A Krickstein	6	5	6
8	(United States) P Annacone	4	6	2
(United States) S Davis	6	4	6
(United States) G Donnelly	6	6	3
2	(Ecuador) A Gómez	7	4	6

Quarterfinals
5	(Soviet Union) A Chesnokov	2	6
3	(United States) A Krickstein	6	7
(United States) S Davis	2	4
2	(Ecuador) A Gómez	6	6

Semifinals
3	(United States) A Krickstein	4	1
2	(Ecuador) A Gómez	6	6
