= 1991 KAL Cup Korea Open =

- Date: 15–22 April
- Edition: 5th
- Category: World Series (Free Week)
- Draw: 32S / 16D
- Prize money: $140,000
- Surface: Hard / outdoor
- Location: Seoul, South Korea

Champions

Singles
- (Germany) Patrick Baur

Doubles
- (Austria) Alex Antonitsch / (Israel) Gilad Bloom
← 1990 ·	KAL Cup Korea Open	· 1992 →

The 1991 KAL Cup Korea Open was a men's tennis tournament played on outdoor hard courts that was part of the World Series of the 1991 ATP Tour. It was the fifth edition of the Seoul Open and was played at Seoul in South Korea from 15 April through 22 April 1991. Unseeded Patrick Baur won the singles title.

== Finals ==
=== Singles ===
(Germany) Patrick Baur defeated (United States) Jeff Tarango 6–4, 1–6, 7–6^{(7–5)}

- It was Baur's 2nd title of the year and the 4th of his career.

=== Doubles ===
(Austria) Alex Antonitsch / (Israel) Gilad Bloom defeated (United States) Kent Kinnear / (United States) Sven Salumaa 7–6, 6–1

- It was Antonitsch's only title of the year and the 4th of his career. It was Bloom's 1st title of the year and the 3rd of his career.
