= 1986 Seiko Super Tennis Hong Kong – Doubles =

Doubles
- 1986 Seiko Super Tennis Hong Kong

Final
- Champions: (United States) Mike De Palmer (United States) Gary Donnelly
- Runners-up: (Australia) Pat Cash (Australia) Mark Kratzmann
- Score: 7–6, 6–7, 7–5

Details
- Draw: 16 (1WC)
- Seeds: 4

Events
Singles	Doubles
← 1985 ·	Hong Kong Open	· 1987 →

Brad Drewett and Kim Warwick were the defending champions, but competed this year with different partners. Drewett teamed up with Mark Edmondson and lost in the first round to Chip Hooper and Mike Leach, while Warwick teamed up with Steve Denton and also lost in the first round to Scott Davis and David Pate.

Mike De Palmer and Gary Donnelly won the title by defeating Pat Cash and Mark Kratzmann 7–6, 6–7, 7–5 in the final.

== Seeds ==
1. (Australia) John Fitzgerald / (Ecuador) Andrés Gómez (quarterfinals)
2. (United States) Paul Annacone / (South Africa) Christo van Rensburg (semifinals)
3. (United States) Scott Davis / (United States) David Pate (semifinals)
4. (United States) Mike De Palmer / (United States) Gary Donnelly (champions)

== Draw ==
=== Key ===
- Q = Qualifier
- WC = Wild card
- LL = Lucky loser
- Alt = Alternate
- SE = Special exempt
- PR = Protected ranking
- ITF = ITF entry
- JE = Junior exempt
- w/o = Walkover
- r = Retired
- d = Defaulted
- SR = Special ranking

=== Draw ===
First round
1	(Australia) J Fitzgerald (Ecuador) A Gómez	6	6	6
(South Africa) E Edwards (United States) B Schultz	7	2	3
(Australia) P Cash (Australia) M Kratzamann	6	6
(United States) M Freeman (United States) B Pearce	0	4
3	(United States) S Davis (United States) D Pate	6	6
(United States) S Denton (Australia) K Warwick	3	2
(Australia) B Drewett (Australia) M Edmondson	3	3
(United States) C Hooper (United States) M Leach	6	6
(United States) M Davis (United States) K Flach	6	3	6
(United States) G Layendecker (Canada) G Michibata	3	6	7
(United States) K Jones (United States) T Witsken	3	3
4	(United States) M De Palmer (United States) G Donnelly	6	6
(United States) J Arias (United States) G Holmes	6	6
WC	(United States) J Bailey (Hong Kong) Pang Lui	3	2
(Australia) B Dyke (Australia) W Masur	6	5
2	(Australia) P Annacone (South Africa) C van Rensburg	7	6

Quarterfinals
1	(Australia) J Fitzgerald (Ecuador) A Gómez	2	3
(Australia) P Cash (Australia) M Kratzamann	6	6
3	(United States) S Davis (United States) D Pate	7	6
(United States) C Hooper (United States) M Leach	6	3
(United States) G Layendecker (Canada) G Michibata	0	6
4	(United States) M De Palmer (United States) G Donnelly	6	7
(United States) J Arias (United States) G Holmes	4	2
2	(Australia) P Annacone (South Africa) C van Rensburg	6	6

Semifinals
(Australia) P Cash (Australia) M Kratzamann	6	5	6
3	(United States) S Davis (United States) D Pate	3	7	4
4	(United States) M De Palmer (United States) G Donnelly	7	6
2	(Australia) P Annacone (South Africa) C van Rensburg	6	4

Final
(Australia) P Cash (Australia) M Kratzamann	6	7	5
4	(United States) M De Palmer (United States) G Donnelly	7	6	7
