= Lee Jin-ho (tennis) =

South Korean tennis player

- Country (sports): South Korea

Singles
- Career record: 0–1
- Highest ranking: No. 430 (28 Aug 1993)

Doubles
- Highest ranking: No. 544 (17 Sep 1990)
Medal record
Asian Games
Bronze medal – third place	1990 Beijing	Men's doubles

Lee Jin-ho is a South Korean former professional tennis player.

Lee was a men's doubles bronze medalist for South Korea at the 1990 Asian Games in Beijing. He was also a South Korean Ghafar Cup representative. While playing on the professional tour he attained a best singles world ranking of 430 and featured as a wildcard in the main draw of the 1990 Korea Open, where he was beaten in the first round by the fourth-seed Kelly Evernden. In the domestic tennis competition he competed for the Korean Air team.
