= 1986 Seiko Super Tennis Hong Kong =

- Date: 27 October – 2 November
- Edition: 14th
- Category: Grand Prix
- Draw: 32S / 16D
- Prize money: $200,000
- Surface: Hard / indoor
- Location: Hong Kong

Champions

Singles
- (India) Ramesh Krishnan

Doubles
- (United States) Mike De Palmer / (United States) Gary Donnelly
- Hong Kong Open

The 1986 Seiko Super Tennis Hong Kong, also known as the Hong Kong Open, was a men's tennis tournament played on indoor hard courts at the Victoria Park Tennis Centre in Hong Kong that was part of the 1986 Nabisco Grand Prix tennis circuit. It was the 14th edition of the tournament and was held from 27 October through 2 November 1986. Seventh-seeded Ramesh Krishnan won the singles title.

== Finals ==
=== Singles ===
(India) Ramesh Krishnan defeated (Ecuador) Andrés Gómez 7–6^{(9–7)}, 6–0, 7–5

- It was Krishnan's 2nd singles title of the year and the 5th of his career.

=== Doubles ===
(United States) Mike De Palmer / (United States) Gary Donnelly defeated (Australia) Pat Cash / (Australia) Mark Kratzmann 7–6, 6–7, 7–5
