= 1993 CA-TennisTrophy =

- Date: 18–25 October
- Edition: 19th
- Category: World Series
- Draw: 32S / 16D
- Prize money: $300,000
- Surface: Carpet / indoor
- Location: Vienna, Austria
- Venue: Wiener Stadthalle

Champions

Singles
- (Croatia) Goran Ivanišević

Doubles
- (Zimbabwe) Byron Black / (United States) Jonathan Stark
- Vienna Open

The 1993 CA-TennisTrophy was a men's tennis tournament played on indoor carpet courts at the Wiener Stadthalle in Vienna, Austria and was part of the World Series of the 1993 ATP Tour. It was the 19th edition of the tournament and took place from 18 October until 25 October 1993. Second-seeded Goran Ivanišević won the singles title.

== Champions ==
=== Singles ===
(Croatia) Goran Ivanišević defeated (Austria) Thomas Muster 4–6, 6–4, 6–4, 7–6^{(7–3)}

- It was Ivanišević's 2nd title of the year and the 13th of his career.

=== Doubles ===
(Zimbabwe) Byron Black / (United States) Jonathan Stark defeated (United States) Mike Bauer / (Germany) David Prinosil 6–3, 7–6

- It was Black's 5th title of the year and the 5th of his career. It was Stark's 6th title of the year and the 8th of his career.
