= 1985 Seiko Super Tennis Hong Kong =

- Date: 18–24 November
- Edition: 13th
- Category: Grand Prix
- Draw: 32S / 16D
- Prize money: $200,000
- Surface: Hard / indoor
- Location: Hong Kong

Champions

Singles
- (Ecuador) Andrés Gómez

Doubles
- (Australia) Brad Drewett / (Australia) Kim Warwick
- Hong Kong Open

The Seiko Super Tennis Hong Kong, also known as the 1985 Hong Kong Open, was a men's tennis tournament played on indoor hard courts at the Victoria Park Tennis Centre in Hong Kong that was part of the 1985 Nabisco Grand Prix tennis circuit. It was the 13th edition of the tournament and was held from 18 November through 24 November 1985. Third-seeded Andrés Gómez won the singles title.

== Finals ==
=== Singles ===
(Ecuador) Andrés Gómez defeated (United States) Aaron Krickstein 6–3, 6–3, 3–6, 6–4

- It was Gómez' only singles title of the year and the 10th of his career.

=== Doubles ===
(Australia) Brad Drewett / (Australia) Kim Warwick defeated (Switzerland) Jakob Hlasek / (Czechoslovakia) Tomáš Šmíd 3–6, 6–4, 6–2
