= 1989 Seoul Open =

- Date: 10–17 April
- Edition: 3rd
- Draw: 32S / 16D
- Prize money: $93,400
- Surface: Hard / outdoor
- Location: Seoul, South Korea
- Venue: Seoul Olympic Park Tennis Center

Champions

Singles
- (United States) Robert Van't Hof

Doubles
- (United States) Scott Davis / (Kenya) Paul Wekesa
← 1988 ·	Seoul Open	· 1990 →

The 1989 Seoul Open was a men's tennis tournament played on outdoor hard courts at the Seoul Olympic Park Tennis Center in Seoul in South Korea that was part of the 1989 Nabisco Grand Prix circuit. The tournament was held from April 10 through April 17, 1989. Unseeded Robert Van't Hof won the singles title.

== Finals ==
=== Singles ===
(United States) Robert Van't Hof defeated (Australia) Brad Drewett 7–5, 6–4

- It was Van't Hof's only title of the year and the 6th of his career.

=== Doubles ===
(United States) Scott Davis / (Kenya) Paul Wekesa defeated (United States) John Letts / (United States) Bruce Man-Son-Hing 6–2, 6–4

- It was Davis' 1st title of the year and the 10th of his career. It was Wekesa's only title of the year and the 2nd of his career.
