= Bae Nam-ju =

South Korean tennis player

- Country (sports): South Korea
- Born: 5 December 1965 (age 59)

Singles
- Highest ranking: No. 428 (6 August 1990)

Doubles
- Career record: 0–1 (ATP Tour)
- Highest ranking: No. 399 (20 August 1990)

Team competitions
- Davis Cup: 1–3
Medal record
Asian Games
Silver medal – second place	1990 Beijing	Men's team
Universiade
Bronze medal – third place	1987 Zagreb	Men's doubles

Bae Nam-ju (born 5 December 1965) is a Korean former professional tennis player.

While competing on the professional tour, Bae reached career high rankings of 428 in singles and 399 in doubles. His only main draw appearance on the ATP Tour came in the doubles of the 1990 KAL Cup Korea Open.

Bae was a doubles bronze medalist for South Korea at the 1987 Summer Universiade in Zagreb and was a member of the silver winning men's team at the 1990 Asian Games in Beijing. He featured in three Davis Cup ties for South Korea, between 1988 and 1990.

His Davis Cup debut came against Indonesia in 1988, where he partnered Yoo Jin-sun to a loss in the doubles. In 1990 he returned for a tie against India and teamed up with Yoo Jin-sun to win the doubles rubber over Zeeshan Ali and Leander Paes, which secured the tie. This gave South Korea a spot in the World Group qualifiers and they came up against Belgium in Brussels, but they were unable to progress, with Bae losing two singles rubbers.

== See also ==
- List of South Korea Davis Cup team representatives
