= 1990 Salem Hong Kong Open =

- Date: 23–29 April
- Edition: 15th
- Category: World Series (Free Week)
- Draw: 32S / 16D
- Prize money: $185,000
- Surface: Hard / outdoor
- Location: Hong Kong

Champions

Singles
- (Australia) Pat Cash

Doubles
- (Australia) Pat Cash / (Australia) Wally Masur
| ← 1987 · | Hong Kong Open | · 1991 → |

The 1990 Salem Hong Kong Open was a men's tennis tournament played on outdoor hard courts on Hong Kong Island in Hong Kong that was part of the World Series of the 1990 ATP Tour. It was the 15th edition of the tournament and was held from 23 April through 29 April 1990. Unseeded Pat Cash, who entered the main draw on a wildcard, won the singles title. It was his first singles title since the 1987 South African Open and came almost a year after he ruptured his Achilles tendon.

== Finals ==
=== Singles ===
(Australia) Pat Cash defeated (Austria) Alex Antonitsch 6–1, 6–3

- It was Cash's only singles title of the year and the 6th and last of his career.

=== Doubles ===
(Australia) Pat Cash / (Australia) Wally Masur defeated (United States) Kevin Curren / (United States) Joey Rive 6–3, 6–3

- It was Cash's 2nd and last doubles title of the year and the 10th of his career. It was Masur's 2nd and last doubles title of the year and the 11th of his career.
