= 1992 Seoul Open =

- Date: 20–27 April
- Edition: 6th
- Category: World Series
- Draw: 32S / 16D
- Prize money: $145,000
- Surface: Hard / outdoor
- Location: Seoul, South Korea

Champions

Singles
- (Japan) Shuzo Matsuoka

Doubles
- (United States) Kevin Curren / (South Africa) Gary Muller
← 1991 ·	Seoul Open	· 1993 →

The 1992 Seoul Open was a men's tennis tournament played on outdoor hard courts that was part of the World Series of the 1992 ATP Tour. It was played at Seoul in South Korea from April 20 through April 27, 1992. Fifth-seeded Shuzo Matsuoka won the singles title.

== Finals ==
=== Singles ===
(Japan) Shuzo Matsuoka defeated (Australia) Todd Woodbridge 6–3, 4–6, 7–5

- It was Matsuoka's only title of the year and the 2nd of his career.

=== Doubles ===
(United States) Kevin Curren / (South Africa) Gary Muller defeated (New Zealand) Kelly Evernden / (United States) Brad Pearce 7–6, 6–4

- It was Curren's only title of the year and the 31st of his career. It was Muller's only title of the year and the 6th of his career.
