= Ji Seung-ho =

South Korean tennis player

- Full name: Ji Seung-ho
- Country (sports): South Korea
- Born: 8 April 1968 (age 58)
- Prize money: $12,537

Singles
- Career record: 1–2
- Highest ranking: No. 314 (17 August 1992)

Doubles
- Career record: 2–4
- Highest ranking: No. 295 (24 June 1991)
Medal record
Representing South Korea
Asian Games
Bronze medal – third place	1990 Beijing	Doubles
Summer Universiade
Gold medal – first place	1991 Sheffield	Doubles

Ji Seung-ho (born 8 April 1968) is a former professional tennis player from South Korea.

== Biography ==
Ji won a bronze medal in the men's doubles at the 1990 Asian Games and was a gold medalist in the same event at the 1991 Summer Universiade.

All of his ATP Tour main draw appearances came at his home tournament, the Korea Open in Seoul. He had his best performance at the 1991 Korea Open, where he had a win over Jim Grabb and with partner Chang Eui-jong made the semi-finals of the doubles, beating the top seeded pair Grant Connell and Glenn Michibata en route.

He played in three Davis Cup ties for South Korea, across 1991 and 1992.

== See also ==
- List of South Korea Davis Cup team representatives
