= 1990 KAL Cup Korea Open =

Tennis tournament in Seoul, South Korea

- Date: 16–23 April
- Edition: 4th
- Category: World Series (Free Week)
- Draw: 32S / 16D
- Prize money: $140,000
- Surface: Hard / outdoor
- Location: Seoul, South Korea

Champions

Singles
- (Austria) Alex Antonitsch

Doubles
- (Canada) Grant Connell / (Canada) Glenn Michibata
← 1989 ·	Seoul Open	· 1991 →

The 1990 KAL Cup Korea Open was a men's tennis tournament played on outdoor hard courts that was part of the World Series of the 1990 ATP Tour. It was the fourth edition of the tournament and was played in Seoul, South Korea from April 16 through April 23, 1990. Unseeded Alex Antonitsch won the singles title.

== Finals ==
=== Singles ===
(Austria) Alex Antonitsch defeated (Australia) Pat Cash 7–6, 6–3

- It was Antonitsch's only title of the year and the 3rd of his career.

=== Doubles ===
(Canada) Grant Connell / (Canada) Glenn Michibata defeated (Australia) Jason Stoltenberg / (Australia) Todd Woodbridge 7–6, 6–4

- It was Connell's 1st title of the year and the 2nd of his career. It was Michibata's 1st title of the year and the 2nd of his career.
