= Kim Bong-soo (tennis) =

South Korean tennis player (born 1962)

- Native name: 김봉수
- Country (sports): South Korea
- Born: November 30, 1962 (age 63) Seoul, South Korea
- Height: 5 ft 11 in (180 cm)
- Plays: Right-handed
- Prize money: $83,173

Singles
- Career record: 10–20
- Highest ranking: No. 129 (December 11, 1989)

Grand Slam singles results
- Australian Open: 1R (1988)

Other tournaments
- Olympic Games: 3R (1988)

Doubles
- Career record: 1–9
- Highest ranking: No. 340 (August 20, 1990)
Medal record
Representing South Korea
Summer Universiade
| Bronze medal – third place | 1985 Kobe | Men's singles |
Asian Games
| Gold medal – first place | 1986 Seoul | Men's doubles |
| Gold medal – first place | 1986 Seoul | Men's team |
| Silver medal – second place | 1986 Seoul | Men's singles |
| Silver medal – second place | 1990 Beijing | Men's team |
| Bronze medal – third place | 1990 Beijing | Men's singles |

Kim Bong-soo (born November 30, 1962) is a former tennis player from South Korea, who represented his native country at the 1988 Summer Olympics in Seoul where he scored an upset win over the fancied French contender Henri Leconte. There he was defeated in the third round by Argentina's Martín Jaite. The right-hander(with single-handed backhand) reached his highest singles ATP-ranking on December 11, 1989, when he became the number 129 of the world.

== Grand Slam tournaments Performance timeline ==
Key
| W | F | SF | QF | #R | RR | Q# | DNQ | A | NH |

(W) winner; (F) finalist; (SF) semifinalist; (QF) quarterfinalist; (#R) rounds 4, 3, 2, 1; (RR) round-robin stage; (Q#) qualification round; (DNQ) did not qualify; (A) absent; (NH) not held; (SR) strike rate (events won / competed); (W–L) win–loss record.

=== Singles ===
| Tournament | 1988 | 1989 | 1990 | 1991 | 1992 | 1993 | 1994 | 1995 | W–L | Win % |
|---|---|---|---|---|---|---|---|---|---|---|
| Australian Open | 1R | A | A | A | A | Q2 | Q1 | A | 0–0 | – |
| French Open | | | | | | A | A | Q1 | 0–0 | – |
| Wimbledon | A | A | Q1 | A | A | A | A | Q2 | 0–0 | – |
| US Open | | | | | A | A | A | A | 0–0 | – |
| Win–loss | | | | | | | | 0–0 | 0–0 | – |
