= Kim Jae-sik =

South Korean tennis player

- Full name: Kim Jae-sik
- Country (sports): South Korea
- Born: 17 May 1967 (age 59)

Singles
- Career record: 0–3
- Highest ranking: No. 271 (16 July 1990)

Doubles
- Career record: 0–1
- Highest ranking: No. 351 (20 August 1990)
Medal record
Representing South Korea
Asian Games
Silver medal – second place	1990 Beijing	Team
Bronze medal – third place	1990 Beijing	Singles
Summer Universiade
Bronze medal – third place	1987 Zagreb	Doubles

Kim Jae-sik (born 17 May 1967) is a former professional tennis player from South Korea.

== Biography ==
Kim made all of his ATP Tour main draw appearances at his home tournament, the Korea Open, featuring in every edition from 1990 to 1992.

During his career he played in a total of five Davis Cup ties for South Korea.

At the 1990 Asian Games he won a silver medal in the team event and a bronze medal in the singles.

He is the current captain of the South Korea Davis Cup team.

== See also ==
- List of South Korea Davis Cup team representatives
