= Milan Šrejber =

Czech tennis player (born 1963)

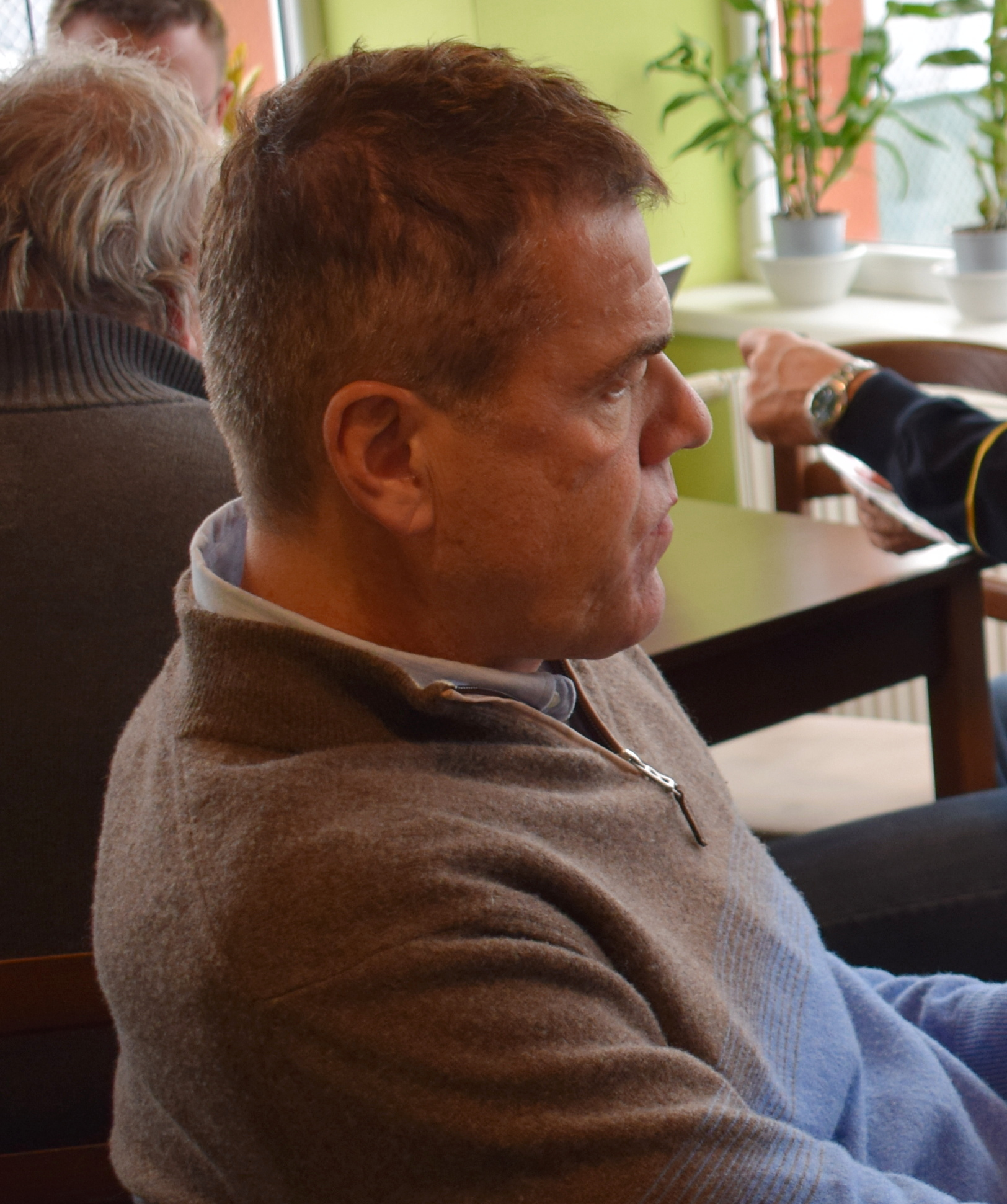
- Milan Šrejber (2018)
- Country (sports): Czechoslovakia
- Residence: Prague, Czech Republic
- Born: 30 December 1963 (age 62) Prague, Czechoslovakia
- Height: 2.03 m (6 ft 8 in)
- Plays: Right-handed
- Prize money: $898,323

Singles
- Career record: 128–129
- Career titles: 1
- Highest ranking: No. 23 (13 October 1986)

Grand Slam singles results
- Australian Open: 2R (1987)
- French Open: 3R (1987)
- Wimbledon: 3R (1986, 1990)
- US Open: QF (1986)

Doubles
- Career record: 67–70
- Career titles: 2
- Highest ranking: No. 37 (12 June 1989)

Grand Slam doubles results
- Australian Open: 4R (1987)
- French Open: QF (1990)
- Wimbledon: 2R (1987, 1989)
- US Open: 3R (1989)
Medal record
Olympic Games – Tennis
Bronze medal – third place	1988 Seoul	Doubles

Milan Šrejber (Czech pronunciation: [ˈmɪlan ˈʃrɛjbr̩]) (born 30 December 1963) is a former tennis player from Czechoslovakia, who represented his native country at the 1988 Summer Olympics in Seoul. There he reached the semi-finals of the men's doubles competition, partnering Miloslav Mečíř. The pair was defeated by America's eventual winners Ken Flach and Robert Seguso, but still won the bronze medal. The right-hander won one career singles title (Rye Brook, 1988), and reached his highest ATP singles ranking of World No. 23 in October 1986.

His best Grand Slam singles result came at 1986 US Open, where he reached the quarterfinals by defeating Jimmy Arias, Broderick Dyke, Jaime Yzaga and Todd Witsken, before losing to Boris Becker in straight sets.

Some of his best performances were in the Davis Cup, where he beat Andrei Cherkasov, Jakob Hlasek, Marc Rosset, Carl-Uwe Steeb, Mats Wilander and Alexander Volkov.

== Career finals ==
=== Singles: 2 (1 win, 1 loss) ===
Result	W/L	Date	Tournament	Surface	Opponent	Score
Loss	1–0	Feb 1986	Toronto, Canada	Carpet (i)	(Sweden) Joakim Nyström	1–6, 4–6
Win	1–1	Aug 1988	Rye Brook, U.S.	Hard	(India) Ramesh Krishnan	6–2, 7–6^{(7–4)}
