= Alex Antonitsch =

Austrian tennis player (born 1966)

- Country (sports): Austria
- Born: 8 February 1966 (age 59) Villach, Austria
- Height: 1.88 m (6 ft 2 in)
- Turned pro: 1988
- Plays: Right-handed
- Prize money: $1,024,171

Singles
- Career record: 106–144
- Career titles: 1
- Highest ranking: No. 40 (9 July 1990)

Grand Slam singles results
- Australian Open: 3R (1993, 1994)
- French Open: 2R (1987, 1990)
- Wimbledon: 4R (1990)
- US Open: 3R (1990)

Other tournaments
- Olympic Games: 1R (1988)

Doubles
- Career record: 115–126
- Career titles: 4
- Highest ranking: No. 54 (16 October 1989)

Grand Slam doubles results
- Australian Open: 2R (1985)
- French Open: 2R (1989)
- Wimbledon: 2R (1995)
- US Open: 3R (1989)

Other doubles tournaments
- Olympic Games: 2R (1988)

Team competitions
- Davis Cup: 19–22

Alexander Antonitsch (born 8 February 1966) is a former tennis player from Austria, who turned professional in 1988.

Antonitsch won one singles title (1990, Seoul) and four doubles titles during his career. The right-hander reached his highest singles ATP-ranking on 9 July 1990, when he became the world No. 40.

From 1983 to 1996, he was a member of the Austrian Davis Cup team, playing 27 matches, mainly doubles; his biggest Davis Cup success was reaching the semifinals in 1990, when the Austrian team was on the brink of reaching the finals against the later 1990 Davis Cup winner USA.

== ATP Tour finals ==
=== Singles: 3 (1 title, 2 runner-ups) ===
Legend Grand Slam tournaments ATP Masters Series ATP Championship Series ATP World Series (1–2)	Finals by surface Hard (1–1) Clay (0–0) Grass (0–1) Carpet (0–0)	Finals by setting Outdoors (1–2) Indoors (0–0)

Result	W–L	Date	Tournament	Category	Surface	Opponent	Score
Win	1–0	Apr 1990	Seoul, South Korea	World Series	Hard	(Australia) Pat Cash	7–6^{(7–2)}, 6–3
Loss	1–1	Apr 1990	Hong Kong, China SAR	World Series	Hard	(Australia) Pat Cash	3–6, 4–6
Loss	1–2	Jul 1992	Newport, United States	World Series	Grass	(United States) Bryan Shelton	4–6, 4–6

=== Doubles: 6 (4 titles, 2 runner-ups) ===
Legend Grand Slam tournaments ATP Masters Series ATP Championship Series ATP World Series (4–1)	Finals by surface Hard (2–2) Clay (0–0) Grass (1–0) Carpet (1–0)	Finals by setting Outdoors (2–1) Indoors (2–1)

Result	W–L	Date	Tournament	Category	Surface	Partner	Opponents	Score
Win	1–0	Oct 1985	Cologne, West Germany	Grand Prix	Hard	(Netherlands) Michiel Schapers	(Sweden) Jan Gunnarsson (Sweden) Peter Lundgren	6–4, 7–5
Win	2–0	Oct 1988	Vienna, Austria	Grand Prix	Carpet	(Hungary) Balázs Taróczy	(United States) Kevin Curren (Czech Republic) Tomáš Šmíd	4–6, 6–3, 7–6
Win	3–0	Apr 1991	Seoul, South Korea	World Series	Hard	(United Kingdom) Greg Rusedski	(United States) Kent Kinnear (United States) Sven Salumaa	7–6, 6–1
Loss	3–1	Jan 1993	Auckland, New Zealand	World Series	Hard	(Russia) Alexander Volkov	(Canada) Grant Connell (United States) Patrick Galbraith	3–6, 6–7
Win	4–1	Jul 1994	Newport, United States	World Series	Grass	(United Kingdom) Greg Rusedski	(United States) Kent Kinnear (United States) David Wheaton	6–4, 3–6, 6–4
Loss	4–2	Oct 1994	Vienna, Austria	World Series	Hard	(United Kingdom) Greg Rusedski	(United States) Mike Bauer (Czech Republic) David Rikl	6–7, 4–6

== ATP Challenger and ITF Futures finals ==
=== Singles: 4 (2–2) ===
Legend ATP Challenger (2–2) ITF Futures (0–0)	Finals by surface Hard (2–1) Carpet (0–1)

Result	W–L	Date	Tournament	Tier	Surface	Opponent	Score
Loss	0–1	Mar 1989	Vilamoura, Portugal	Challenger	Hard	(Portugal) Nuno Marques	1–6, 6–4, 3–6
Loss	0–2	Nov 1991	Helsinki, Finland	Challenger	Carpet	(Netherlands) Michiel Schapers	6–7, 6–4, 5–7
Win	1–2	Aug 1993	Istanbul, Turkey	Challenger	Hard	(France) Olivier Delaître	6–4, 6–1
Win	2–2	Aug 1993	Segovia, Spain	Challenger	Hard	(Spain) Jordi Burillo	6–3, 6–3

=== Doubles: 4 (2–2) ===
Legend ATP Challenger (2–2) ITF Futures (0–0)	Finals by surface Hard (1–1) Carpet (1–1)

Result	W–L	Date	Tournament	Tier	Surface	Partner	Opponents	Score
Loss	0–1	Nov 1989	Copenhagen, Denmark	Challenger	Hard	(Sweden) Ronnie Baathman	(Sweden) Nicklas Kulti (Sweden) Magnus Larsson	3–6, 2–6
Loss	0–2	Nov 1991	Helsinki, Finland	Challenger	Carpet	(United States) Glenn Layendecker	(France) Tarik Benhabiles (France) Henri Leconte	5–7, 6–7
Win	1–2	Dec 1991	Bossonnens, Switzerland	Challenger	Carpet	(Netherlands) Menno Oosting	(Netherlands) Michiel Schapers (Czech Republic) Daniel Vacek	6–3, 6–2
Win	2–2	Aug 1994	Istanbul, Turkey	Challenger	Hard	(Germany) Alexander Mronz	(Norway) Bent-Ove Pedersen (Finland) Olli Rahnasto	6–3, 6–4

== Performance timelines ==
Key
W	F	SF	QF	#R	RR	Q#	DNQ	A	NH

(W) winner; (F) finalist; (SF) semifinalist; (QF) quarterfinalist; (#R) rounds 4, 3, 2, 1; (RR) round-robin stage; (Q#) qualification round; (DNQ) did not qualify; (A) absent; (NH) not held; (SR) strike rate (events won / competed); (W–L) win–loss record.

=== Singles ===
Tournament	1987	1988	1989	1990	1991	1992	1993	1994	1995	SR	W–L	Win %
Grand Slam tournaments
Australian Open	A	A	A	2R	1R	A	3R	3R	A	0 / 4	5–4	56%
French Open	2R	A	A	2R	A	A	A	1R	A	0 / 3	2–3	40%
Wimbledon	1R	1R	A	4R	A	A	1R	1R	Q1	0 / 5	3–5	38%
US Open	1R	A	1R	3R	A	1R	A	1R	Q1	0 / 5	2–5	29%
Win–loss	1–3	0–1	0–1	7–4	0–1	0–1	2–2	2–4	0–0	0 / 17	12–17	41%
National Representation
Summer Olympics	NH	1R	Not Held			A	Not Held			0 / 1	0–1	0%
ATP Masters Series
Miami	A	1R	A	A	A	A	A	A	A	0 / 1	0–1	0%
Monte Carlo	A	A	A	A	A	A	A	1R	A	0 / 1	0–1	0%
Rome	A	A	A	A	1R	A	A	A	A	0 / 1	0–1	0%
Canada	A	A	QF	A	A	A	2R	1R	A	0 / 3	4–3	57%
Cincinnati	A	1R	1R	A	A	A	A	A	A	0 / 2	0–2	0%
Paris	A	A	A	A	A	Q1	A	A	A	0 / 0	0–0	–
Win–loss	0–0	0–2	3–2	0–0	0–1	0–0	1–1	0–2	0–0	0 / 8	4–8	33%

=== Doubles ===
Tournament	1985	1986	1987	1988	1989	1990	1991	1992	1993	1994	1995	1996	SR	W–L	Win %
Grand Slam tournaments
Australian Open	2R	A	A	A	A	1R	1R	A	A	A	A	A	0 / 3	1–3	25%
French Open	A	A	A	A	2R	A	A	A	A	A	A	A	0 / 1	1–1	50%
Wimbledon	A	A	A	A	1R	1R	A	A	A	A	2R	A	0 / 3	1–3	25%
US Open	A	2R	2R	A	3R	A	A	1R	A	2R	2R	A	0 / 6	6–6	50%
Win–loss	1–1	1–1	1–1	0–0	3–3	0–2	0–1	0–1	0–0	1–1	2–2	0–0	0 / 13	9–13	41%
National Representation
Summer Olympics	Not Held			2R	Not Held			A	Not Held			A	0 / 1	1–1	0%
ATP Masters Series
Miami	A	A	A	1R	A	A	A	A	A	A	A	A	0 / 1	0–1	0%
Rome	A	2R	A	A	A	A	A	A	A	A	A	A	0 / 1	1–1	50%
Canada	A	A	A	A	QF	A	A	A	2R	Q2	A	A	0 / 2	3–2	60%
Cincinnati	A	A	A	1R	A	QF	A	A	A	A	A	A	0 / 2	2–2	50%
Win–loss	0–0	1–1	0–0	0–2	2–1	2–1	0–0	0–0	1–1	0–0	0–0	0–0	0 / 6	6–6	50%
