= 2008 Bank Austria-TennisTrophy =

- Date: 6–12 October
- Edition: 34th
- Category: International Series Gold
- Draw: 32S / 16D
- Prize money: €653,000
- Surface: Hard / indoor
- Location: Vienna, Austria
- Venue: Wiener Stadthalle

Champions

Singles
- (Germany) Philipp Petzschner

Doubles
- (Belarus) Max Mirnyi / (Israel) Andy Ram
← 2007 ·	Vienna Open	· 2009 →

The 2008 Bank Austria-TennisTrophy was a men's tennis tournament played on indoor hard courts. It was the 34th edition of the event known that year as the Bank Austria-TennisTrophy, and was part of the International Series Gold of the 2008 ATP Tour. It took place at the Wiener Stadthalle in Vienna, Austria, from October 6 through October 12, 2008.

The singles featured ATP No. 10, Rome Masters and Doha finalist, Beijing Olympics doubles gold medalist Stanislas Wawrinka, Beijing Olympics silver medalist, Viña del Mar and Munich winner Fernando González, and Stuttgart, Kitzbühel, Los Angeles, Washington champion, Tokyo finalist Juan Martín del Potro. Also present were Nottingham winner Ivo Karlović, Umag titlist Fernando Verdasco, Tommy Robredo, Gilles Simon and Gaël Monfils.

== Finals ==
=== Singles ===
(Germany) Philipp Petzschner defeated (France) Gaël Monfils, 6–4, 6–4

- It was Philipp Petzschner's 1st career title.

=== Doubles ===
(Belarus) Max Mirnyi / (Israel) Andy Ram defeated (Germany) Philipp Petzschner / (Austria) Alexander Peya, 6–1, 7–5
