= 2009 Bank Austria-TennisTrophy – Doubles =

Doubles
- 2009 Bank Austria-TennisTrophy

Final
- Champions: (Poland) Łukasz Kubot (Austria) Oliver Marach
- Runners-up: (Austria) Julian Knowle (Austria) Jürgen Melzer
- Score: 2–6, 6–4, [11–9]

Details
- Draw: 16
- Seeds: 4

Events
Singles	Doubles
← 2008 ·	Vienna Open	· 2010 →

Max Mirnyi and Andy Ram were the defending champions, but they chose not to participate this year.
Łukasz Kubot and Oliver Marach won in the final 2–6, 6–4, [11–9] against Julian Knowle and Jürgen Melzer.

== Seeds ==
1. (Canada) Daniel Nestor / (Serbia) Nenad Zimonjić (first round)
2. (Poland) Mariusz Fyrstenberg / (Poland) Marcin Matkowski (quarterfinals)
3. (Poland) Łukasz Kubot / (Austria) Oliver Marach (champions)
4. (Austria) Julian Knowle / (Austria) Jürgen Melzer (final)

== Draw ==
=== Key ===
- Q = Qualifier
- WC = Wild card
- LL = Lucky loser
- Alt = Alternate
- SE = Special exempt
- PR = Protected ranking
- ITF = ITF entry
- JE = Junior exempt
- w/o = Walkover
- r = Retired
- d = Defaulted
- SR = Special ranking

First round
1	(Canada) D Nestor (Serbia) N Zimonjić	6	6^{8}	[6]
(United States) J Isner (Australia) J Kerr	4	7^{10}	[10]
(Italy) A Seppi (Italy) S Vagnozzi	6	7^{7}
(Spain) N Almagro (Spain) G García-López	2	6^{5}
3	(Poland) Ł Kubot (Austria) O Marach	6	5	[10]
(Switzerland) M Chiudinelli (Australia) P Luczak	2	7	[8]
(Germany) M Kohlmann (Austria) A Peya	7^{7}	7^{12}
(Australia) C Ball (United States) T Rettenmaier	6^{4}	6^{10}
(Croatia) M Čilić (Croatia) L Zovko	6	6
(Spain) F López (Spain) M López	3	2
(Czech Republic) L Dlouhý (Germany) P Petzschner	5	3
4	(Austria) J Knowle (Austria) J Melzer	7	6
(Germany) C Kas (Germany) P Kohlschreiber	6	6
WC	(Czech Republic) J Hájek (Austria) D Köllerer	2	4
WC	(Austria) M Fischer (Austria) P Oswald	4	6^{3}
2	(Poland) M Fyrstenberg (Poland) M Matkowski	6	7^{7}

Quarterfinals
(United States) J Isner (Australia) J Kerr	6	7^{9}
(Italy) A Seppi (Italy) S Vagnozzi	3	6^{7}
3	(Poland) Ł Kubot (Austria) O Marach	6^{4}	6	[10]
(Germany) M Kohlmann (Austria) A Peya	7^{7}	4	[8]
(Croatia) M Čilić (Croatia) L Zovko	6^{1}	5
4	(Austria) J Knowle (Austria) J Melzer	7^{7}	7
(Germany) C Kas (Germany) P Kohlschreiber	6	3	[11]
2	(Poland) M Fyrstenberg (Poland) M Matkowski	4	6	[9]

Semifinals
(United States) J Isner (Australia) J Kerr	4	6	[6]
3	(Poland) Ł Kubot (Austria) O Marach	6	3	[10]
4	(Austria) J Knowle (Austria) J Melzer	6	1	[10]
(Germany) C Kas (Germany) P Kohlschreiber	4	6	[6]

Finals
3	(Poland) Ł Kubot (Austria) O Marach	2	6	[11]
4	(Austria) J Knowle (Austria) J Melzer	6	4	[9]
