= 2009 Bank Austria-TennisTrophy – Singles =

Singles
- 2009 Bank Austria-TennisTrophy

Final
- Champion: (Austria) Jürgen Melzer
- Runner-up: (Croatia) Marin Čilić
- Score: 6–4, 6–3

Details
- Draw: 32
- Seeds: 8

Events
Singles	Doubles
← 2008 ·	Vienna Open	· 2010 →

Philipp Petzschner was the defending champion, but withdrew before the tournament.

Jürgen Melzer defeated Marin Čilić in the final 6–4, 6–3 in his hometown of Vienna.

== Seeds ==
1. (Croatia) Marin Čilić (final)
2. (Czech Republic) Radek Štěpánek (quarterfinals)
3. (France) Gaël Monfils (quarterfinals)
4. (Germany) Philipp Kohlschreiber (semifinals)
5. (Spain) Nicolás Almagro (quarterfinals)
6. (Spain) Feliciano López (quarterfinals)
7. (Austria) Jürgen Melzer (champion)
8. (United States) John Isner (first round)

== Draw ==
=== Key ===
- Q = Qualifier
- WC = Wild card
- LL = Lucky loser
- Alt = Alternate
- SE = Special exempt
- PR = Protected ranking
- ITF = ITF entry
- JE = Junior exempt
- w/o = Walkover
- r = Retired
- d = Defaulted
- SR = Special ranking

=== Finals ===
Semifinals
1	(Croatia) Marin Čilić	6	7^{7}
4	(Germany) Philipp Kohlschreiber	4	6^{4}
(Serbia) Janko Tipsarević	6	6^{5}	4
7	(Austria) Jürgen Melzer	4	7^{7}	6

Final
1	(Croatia) Marin Čilić	4	3
7	(Austria) Jürgen Melzer	6	6

=== Top half ===
First round
1	(Croatia) M Čilić	6	6
Q	(Colombia) A Falla	2	3
(Germany) D Brands	7^{7}	7
(United States) R Kendrick	6^{5}	5
(Austria) D Köllerer	6	6
(Finland) J Nieminen	1	2
WC	(Austria) A Haider-Maurer	4	4
6	(Spain) F López	6	6
4	(Germany) P Kohlschreiber	6	6
Q	(Germany) D Kindlmann	1	3
(Czech Republic) J Hernych	3	3
(Romania) V Crivoi	6	6
(United States) W Odesnik	6	5	7^{8}
Q	(Czech Republic) L Rosol	2	7	6^{6}
(Australia) P Luczak	7	6^{3}	1
5	(Spain) N Almagro	5	7^{7}	6

Second round
1	(Croatia) M Čilić	7^{9}	6
(Germany) D Brands	6^{7}	4
(Austria) D Köllerer	3	3
6	(Spain) F López	6	6
4	(Germany) P Kohlschreiber	6	3
(Romania) V Crivoi	2	0^{r}
(United States) W Odesnik	4	4
5	(Spain) N Almagro	6	6

Quarterfinals
1	(Croatia) M Čilić	6	6
6	(Spain) F López	1	4
4	(Germany) P Kohlschreiber	7	6
5	(Spain) N Almagro	5	4

Semifinals
1	(Croatia) M Čilić	6	7^{7}
4	(Germany) P Kohlschreiber	4	6^{4}

=== Bottom half ===
First round
8	(United States) J Isner	6^{4}	4
(Serbia) J Tipsarević	7^{7}	6
(Belgium) S Darcis	3	2
LL	(Germany) M Berrer	6	6
(Italy) A Seppi	6^{4}	7	3
(Czech Republic) J Hájek	7^{7}	5	6
(Spain) G García-López	5	4
3	(France) G Monfils	7	6
7	(Austria) J Melzer	7^{7}	7^{12}
(Switzerland) M Chiudinelli	6^{4}	6^{10}
(Spain) R Ramírez Hidalgo	3	4
Q	(Slovakia) D Hrbatý	6	6
WC	(Austria) S Koubek	6	4	4
(Portugal) F Gil	4	6	6
(Poland) Ł Kubot	4	1
2	(Czech Republic) R Štěpánek	6	6

Second round
(Serbia) J Tipsarević	7^{7}	6
LL	(Germany) M Berrer	6^{3}	1
(Czech Republic) J Hájek	1	6	4
3	(France) G Monfils	6	2	6
7	(Austria) J Melzer	6	7
Q	(Slovakia) D Hrbatý	4	5
(Portugal) F Gil	2	3
2	(Czech Republic) R Štěpánek	6	6

Quarterfinals
(Serbia) J Tipsarević	6	6^{8}	6
3	(France) G Monfils	4	7^{10}	3
7	(Austria) J Melzer	6	6
2	(Czech Republic) R Štěpánek	2	2

Semifinals
(Serbia) J Tipsarević	6	6^{5}	4
7	(Austria) J Melzer	4	7^{7}	6
