= 2015 Erste Bank Open =

- Date: 19–25 October
- Edition: 41st
- Category: ATP World Tour 500 Series
- Draw: 32S / 16D
- Prize money: €1,745,040
- Surface: Hard
- Location: Vienna, Austria
- Venue: Wiener Stadthalle

Champions

Singles
- (Spain) David Ferrer

Doubles
- (Poland) Łukasz Kubot / (Brazil) Marcelo Melo
- Vienna Open

The 2015 Erste Bank Open was a men's tennis tournament played on indoor hard courts. It was the 41st edition of the event, and part of the ATP World Tour 500 Series of the 2015 ATP World Tour. It was held at the Wiener Stadthalle in Vienna, Austria, from 19 October until 25 October 2015. First-seeded David Ferrer won the singles title.

== Finals ==
=== Singles ===
- (Spain) David Ferrer defeated (United States) Steve Johnson 4–6, 6–4, 7–5

=== Doubles ===
- (Poland) Łukasz Kubot / (Brazil) Marcelo Melo defeated (United Kingdom) Jamie Murray / (Australia) John Peers 4–6, 7–6^{(7–3)}, [10–6]

== Points and prize money ==
=== Point distribution ===
Event	W	F	SF	QF	Round of 16	Round of 32	Q	Q2	Q1
Singles	500	300	180	90	45	0	20	10	0
Doubles	500	300	180	90	0	—N/a	—N/a	—N/a	—N/a

=== Prize money ===
Event	W	F	SF	QF	Round of 16	Round of 32	Q2	Q1
Singles	€423,000	€190,800	€90,350	€43,600	€22,230	€12,225	€1,375	€760
Doubles	€125,000	€56,390	€26,590	€12,850	€6,600	—N/a	—N/a	—N/a

== Singles main-draw entrants ==
=== Seeds ===
Country	Player	Rank^{1}	Seed
ESP	David Ferrer	8	1
RSA	Kevin Anderson	10	2
USA	John Isner	13	3
FRA	Jo-Wilfried Tsonga	15	4
AUT	Dominic Thiem	18	5
FRA	Gaël Monfils	19	6
CRO	Ivo Karlović	21	7
ITA	Fabio Fognini	26	8

- Rankings are as of October 12, 2015

=== Other entrants ===
The following players received wildcards into the singles main draw:

- (Germany) Tommy Haas
- (Austria) Gerald Melzer
- (Austria) Dennis Novak

The following players received entry from the qualifying draw:

- (France) Kenny de Schepper
- (Austria) Lucas Miedler
- (Germany) Jan-Lennard Struff
- (Japan) Yūichi Sugita

=== Withdrawals ===
Before the tournament

- (Australia) Sam Groth →replaced by Jerzy Janowicz
- (Germany) Florian Mayer →replaced by Sergiy Stakhovsky
- (Canada) Milos Raonic →replaced by Paolo Lorenzi

== Doubles main-draw entrants ==
=== Seeds ===
Country	Player	Country	Player	Rank^{1}	Seed
NED	Jean-Julien Rojer	ROU	Horia Tecău	9	1
GBR	Jamie Murray	AUS	John Peers	15	2
POL	Marcin Matkowski	SRB	Nenad Zimonjić	20	3
IND	Rohan Bopanna	ROU	Florin Mergea	28	4

- Rankings are as of October 12, 2015

=== Other entrants ===
The following pairs received wildcards into the doubles main draw:

- (Austria) Andreas Haider-Maurer / (Austria) Oliver Marach
- (Austria) Julian Knowle / (Canada) Daniel Nestor

The following pair received entry from the qualifying draw:

- (United States) Rajeev Ram / (Czech Republic) Radek Štěpánek
