= 1992 CA-TennisTrophy – Singles =

Singles
- 1992 CA-TennisTrophy

Final
- Champion: (Czechoslovakia) Petr Korda
- Runner-up: (Italy) Gianluca Pozzi
- Score: 6–3, 6–2, 5–7, 6–1

Details
- Draw: 32
- Seeds: 8

Events
Singles	Doubles
← 1991 ·	Vienna Open	· 1993 →

Michael Stich was the defending champion but did not compete that year.

Petr Korda won in the final 6–3, 6–2, 5–7, 6–1 against Gianluca Pozzi.

== Seeds ==
1. (Czechoslovakia) Petr Korda (champion)
2. (Spain) Carlos Costa (first round)
3. (Spain) Sergi Bruguera (second round)
4. (United States) Brad Gilbert (quarterfinals)
5. (Israel) Amos Mansdorf (first round)
6. (Commonwealth of Independent States) Andriy Medvedev (second round)
7. (Commonwealth of Independent States) Andrei Cherkasov (first round)
8. (France) Fabrice Santoro (second round)

== Draw ==
=== Key ===
- Q = Qualifier
- WC = Wild card
- LL = Lucky loser
- Alt = Alternate
- SE = Special exempt
- PR = Protected ranking
- ITF = ITF entry
- JE = Junior exempt
- w/o = Walkover
- r = Retired
- d = Defaulted
- SR = Special ranking

=== Final ===
Semifinals
1	(Czechoslovakia) Petr Korda	7	6^{2}	6
(Netherlands) Jan Siemerink	5	7^{7}	3
Q	(Italy) Gianluca Pozzi	6	6^{3}	6
(Commonwealth of Independent States) Andrei Chesnokov	2	7^{7}	4

Final
1	(Czechoslovakia) Petr Korda	6	6	5	6
Q	(Italy) Gianluca Pozzi	3	2	7	1

=== Section 1 ===
First round
1	(Czechoslovakia) P Korda	6	6
(France) F Fontang	2	1
(Austria) H Skoff	6	7
(Netherlands) J Eltingh	2	5
(Austria) A Antonitsch	4	6	6
(Netherlands) P Haarhuis	6	4	3
(United States) J Connors	6	6^{2}	3
8	(France) F Santoro	3	7^{7}	6
4	(United States) B Gilbert	7^{7}	7^{7}
WC	(Sweden) T Enqvist	6^{5}	6^{4}
(Germany) M Naewie	6	6
(Sweden) L Jonsson	4	2
(Germany) B Karbacher	1	4
(Netherlands) J Siemerink	6	6
(Sweden) M Gustafsson	4	4
6	(Commonwealth of Independent States) A Medvedev	6	6

Second round
1	(Czechoslovakia) P Korda	6	6
(Austria) H Skoff	4	3
(Austria) A Antonitsch	6	4	6
8	(France) F Santoro	4	6	4
4	(United States) B Gilbert	6	6
(Germany) M Naewie	2	3
(Netherlands) J Siemerink	6	7^{7}
6	(Commonwealth of Independent States) A Medvedev	3	6^{3}

Quarterfinals
1	(Czechoslovakia) P Korda	7^{7}	6
(Austria) A Antonitsch	6^{2}	4
4	(United States) B Gilbert	1	6	3
(Netherlands) J Siemerink	6	1	6

Semifinals
1	(Czechoslovakia) P Korda	7	6^{2}	6
(Netherlands) J Siemerink	5	7^{7}	3

=== Section 2 ===
First round
5	(Israel) A Mansdorf	4	2
(Sweden) C Bergström	6	6
WC	(Austria) G Mandl	2	4
Q	(Germany) D Prinosil	6	6
Q	(Italy) G Pozzi	6	6
(Sweden) A Järryd	3	4
(France) G Raoux	3	4
3	(Spain) S Bruguera	6	6
7	(Commonwealth of Independent States) A Cherkasov	4	6	4
Q	(Germany) T Gollwitzer	6	3	6
WC	(Austria) T Buchmayer	4	7^{7}	6
(Austria) T Přerovsky	6	6^{2}	3
(Commonwealth of Independent States) A Chesnokov	6	6^{9}	6
(Italy) S Pescosolido	4	7^{11}	4
Q	(Commonwealth of Independent States) D Poliakov	6	7
2	(Spain) C Costa	3	5

Second round
(Sweden) C Bergström	7^{7}	1	4
Q	(Germany) D Prinosil	6^{4}	6	6
Q	(Italy) G Pozzi	6	6
3	(Spain) S Bruguera	2	3
Q	(Germany) T Gollwitzer	6	6^{4}	6
WC	(Austria) T Buchmayer	4	7^{7}	3
(Commonwealth of Independent States) A Chesnokov	4	7^{7}	6
Q	(Commonwealth of Independent States) D Poliakov	6	6^{1}	1

Quarterfinals
Q	(Germany) D Prinosil	4	0
Q	(Italy) G Pozzi	6	6
Q	(Germany) T Gollwitzer	6^{2}	2
(Commonwealth of Independent States) A Chesnokov	7^{7}	6

Semifinals
Q	(Italy) G Pozzi	6	6^{3}	6
(Commonwealth of Independent States) A Chesnokov	2	7^{7}	4
