= 1991 CA-TennisTrophy =

- Date: 14–21 October 1991
- Edition: 17th
- Category: World Series (Free Week)
- Draw: 32S / 16D
- Prize money: $125,000
- Surface: Carpet / indoor
- Location: Vienna, Austria
- Venue: Wiener Stadthalle

Champions

Singles
- (Germany) Michael Stich

Doubles
- (Sweden) Anders Järryd / (South Africa) Gary Muller
- Vienna Open

The 1991 CA-TennisTrophy was a men's tennis tournament played on indoor carpet courts at the Wiener Stadthalle in Vienna in Austria and was part of the World Series of the 1991 ATP Tour. It was the 17th edition of the tournament and was held from 14 October through 21 October 1991. First-seeded Michael Stich won the singles title.

== Finals ==
=== Singles ===
(Germany) Michael Stich defeated (Netherlands) Jan Siemerink 6–4, 6–4, 6–4

- It was Stich's 4th singles title of the year and the 5th of his career.

=== Doubles ===
(Sweden) Anders Järryd / (South Africa) Gary Muller defeated (Switzerland) Jakob Hlasek / (United States) Patrick McEnroe 6–4, 7–5

- It was Järryd's 5th title of the year and the 52nd of his career. It was Muller's 2nd title of the year and the 5th of his career.
