= 1989 CA-TennisTrophy =

- Date: 16–23 October
- Edition: 15th
- Category: Grand Prix
- Draw: 32S / 16D
- Prize money: $225,000
- Surface: Carpet / indoor
- Location: Vienna, Austria
- Venue: Wiener Stadthalle

Champions

Singles
- (United States) Paul Annacone

Doubles
- (Sweden) Jan Gunnarsson / (Sweden) Anders Järryd
- Vienna Open

The 1989 CA-TennisTrophy was a men's tennis tournament played on indoor carpet courts at the Wiener Stadthalle in Vienna, Austria that was part of the 1989 Nabisco Grand Prix. It was the 15th edition of the tournament and took place from 16 October until 23 October 1989. Unseeded Paul Annacone won the singles title.

== Finals ==
=== Singles ===
(United States) Paul Annacone defeated (New Zealand) Kelly Evernden 6–7, 6–4, 6–1, 2–6, 6–3

- It was Annacone's 3rd title of the year and the 14th of his career.

=== Doubles ===
(Sweden) Jan Gunnarsson / (Sweden) Anders Järryd defeated (United States) Paul Annacone / (New Zealand) Kelly Evernden 6–2, 6–3

- It was Gunnarsson's only title of the year and the 9th of his career. It was Järryd's 3rd title of the year and the 45th of his career.
