= 2015 Erste Bank Open – Doubles =

Doubles
- 2015 Erste Bank Open

Final
- Champions: (Poland) Łukasz Kubot (Brazil) Marcelo Melo
- Runners-up: (United Kingdom) Jamie Murray (Australia) John Peers
- Score: 4–6, 7–6^{(7–3)}, [10–6]

Details
- Draw: 16
- Seeds: 4

Events
Singles	Doubles
← 2014 ·	Vienna Open	· 2016 →

Jürgen Melzer and Philipp Petzschner were the defending champions, but chose not to participate this year.
Łukasz Kubot and Marcelo Melo won the title, defeating Jamie Murray and John Peers in the final, 4–6, 7–6^{(7–3)}, [10–6].

== Seeds ==
1. (Netherlands) Jean-Julien Rojer / (Romania) Horia Tecău (quarterfinals)
2. (United Kingdom) Jamie Murray / (Australia) John Peers (final)
3. (Poland) Marcin Matkowski / (Serbia) Nenad Zimonjić (quarterfinals)
4. (India) Rohan Bopanna / (Romania) Florin Mergea (first round)

== Draw ==
=== Key ===
- Q = Qualifier
- WC = Wild card
- LL = Lucky loser
- Alt = Alternate
- SE = Special exempt
- PR = Protected ranking
- ITF = ITF entry
- JE = Junior exempt
- w/o = Walkover
- r = Retired
- d = Defaulted
- SR = Special ranking

=== Draw ===
First round
1	(Netherlands) J-J Rojer (Romania) H Tecău	6	6
(Philippines) T Huey (Finland) H Kontinen	4	4
(Poland) Ł Kubot (Brazil) M Melo	6	6^{9}	[10]
(Colombia) JS Cabal (Colombia) R Farah	3	7^{11}	[8]
3	(Poland) M Matkowski (Serbia) N Zimonjić	6	6
(Spain) G García-López (Austria) D Thiem	0	3
(Spain) D Ferrer (Spain) M López	4	3
(Spain) D Marrero (Italy) A Seppi	6	6
Q	(United States) R Ram (Czech Republic) R Štěpánek	4	2
(Italy) F Fognini (Belarus) M Mirnyi	6	6
WC	(Austria) J Knowle (Canada) D Nestor	7^{7}	5	[10]
4	(India) R Bopanna (Romania) F Mergea	6^{5}	7	[4]
WC	(Austria) A Haider-Maurer (Austria) O Marach	4	3
(Austria) A Peya (Brazil) B Soares	6	6
(United States) M Bryan (United States) S Johnson	6^{8}	3
2	(United Kingdom) J Murray (Australia) J Peers	7^{10}	6

Quarterfinals
1	(Netherlands) J-J Rojer (Romania) H Tecău	6^{4}	4
(Poland) Ł Kubot (Brazil) M Melo	7^{7}	6
3	(Poland) M Matkowski (Serbia) N Zimonjić	5	7	[8]
(Spain) D Marrero (Italy) A Seppi	7	5	[10]
(Italy) F Fognini (Belarus) M Mirnyi	6	6
WC	(Austria) J Knowle (Canada) D Nestor	3	2
(Austria) A Peya (Brazil) B Soares	2	3
2	(United Kingdom) J Murray (Australia) J Peers	6	6

Semifinals
(Poland) Ł Kubot (Brazil) M Melo	6	6
(Spain) D Marrero (Italy) A Seppi	3	4
(Italy) F Fognini (Belarus) M Mirnyi	2	3
2	(United Kingdom) J Murray (Australia) J Peers	6	6

Final
(Poland) Ł Kubot (Brazil) M Melo	4	7^{7}	[10]
2	(United Kingdom) J Murray (Australia) J Peers	6	6^{3}	[6]

== Qualifying ==
=== Seeds ===
1. (United States) Rajeev Ram / (Czech Republic) Radek Štěpánek (qualified)
2. (Poland) Mateusz Kowalczyk / (Croatia) Dino Marcan (qualifying competition)

=== Qualifiers ===
1. (United States) Rajeev Ram / (Czech Republic) Radek Štěpánek

=== Qualifying draw ===
First round
1	(United States) Rajeev Ram (Czech Republic) Radek Štěpánek	6	6
WC	(Austria) Gerald Melzer (Austria) Lucas Miedler	2	3
(Belgium) Ruben Bemelmans (Germany) Frank Moser	4	4
2	(Poland) Mateusz Kowalczyk (Croatia) Dino Marcan	6	6

Qualifying competition
1	(United States) Rajeev Ram (Czech Republic) Radek Štěpánek	4	6	[10]
2	(Poland) Mateusz Kowalczyk (Croatia) Dino Marcan	6	2	[8]
