= 1990 CA-TennisTrophy =

- Date: 15–22 October
- Edition: 16th
- Category: World Series (Free Week)
- Draw: 32S / 16D
- Prize money: $225,000
- Surface: Carpet / indoor
- Location: Vienna, Austria
- Venue: Wiener Stadthalle

Champions

Singles
- (Sweden) Anders Järryd

Doubles
- (Germany) Udo Riglewski / (Germany) Michael Stich
- Vienna Open

The 1990 CA-TennisTrophy was a men's tennis tournament played on indoor carpet courts at the Wiener Stadthalle in Vienna, Austria and was part of the World Series of the 1990 ATP Tour. It was the 16th edition of the tournament and was held from 15 October through 22 October 1990. Unseeded Anders Järryd won the singles title.

== Finals ==
=== Singles ===
(Sweden) Anders Järryd defeated (Austria) Horst Skoff 6–3, 6–3, 6–1

- It was Järryd's only title of the year and the 47th of his career.

=== Doubles ===
(Germany) Udo Riglewski / (Germany) Michael Stich defeated (Mexico) Jorge Lozano / (United States) Todd Witsken 6–4, 6–4

- It was Riglewski's 4th title of the year and the 9th of his career. It was Stich's 4th title of the year and the 5th of his career.
