= 2006 BA-CA-TennisTrophy – Doubles =

Doubles
- 2006 BA-CA-TennisTrophy

Final
- Champions: (Czech Republic) Petr Pála (Czech Republic) Pavel Vízner
- Runners-up: (Austria) Julian Knowle (Austria) Jürgen Melzer
- Score: 6–4, 3–6, [12–10]

Details
- Draw: 16
- Seeds: 4

Events
Singles	Doubles
← 2005 ·	Vienna Open	· 2007 →

Mark Knowles and Daniel Nestor were the defending champions, but did not participate this year.

Petr Pála and Pavel Vízner won in the final 6–4, 3–6, [12–10], against Julian Knowle and Jürgen Melzer.

== Seeds ==
1. (Israel) Jonathan Erlich / (Israel) Andy Ram (semifinals)
2. (Poland) Mariusz Fyrstenberg / (Poland) Marcin Matkowski (quarterfinals)
3. (Austria) Julian Knowle / (Austria) Jürgen Melzer (final)
4. (Czech Republic) Petr Pála / (Czech Republic) Pavel Vízner (champions)

== Draw ==
=== Key ===
- Q = Qualifier
- WC = Wild card
- LL = Lucky loser
- Alt = Alternate
- SE = Special exempt
- PR = Protected ranking
- ITF = ITF entry
- JE = Junior exempt
- w/o = Walkover
- r = Retired
- d = Defaulted
- SR = Special ranking

=== Draw ===
First round
1	(Israel) J Erlich (Israel) A Ram	6	6
(Serbia) N Djokovic (Slovakia) D Hrbatý	4	2
(Poland) Ł Kubot (Czech Republic) T Zíb	3	1
(Argentina) M García (Germany) M Kohlmann	6	6
4	(Czech Republic) P Pála (Czech Republic) P Vízner	3	6	[10]
WC	(Austria) S Koubek (Georgia (country)) I Labadze	6	4	[2]
(Austria) O Marach (Czech Republic) C Suk	4	6	[10]
(South Africa) J Coetzee (Netherlands) R Wassen	6	1	[8]
(France) R Gasquet (France) S Grosjean
(Argentina) D Nalbandian (Argentina) S Prieto	w/o
(Czech Republic) L Friedl (Slovakia) M Mertiňák	4	3
3	(Austria) J Knowle (Austria) J Melzer	6	6
(Argentina) A Calleri (Chile) F González	5	7^{7}	[11]
(Argentina) J Acasuso (Argentina) JI Chela	7	6^{2}	[9]
WC	(Austria) M Fischer (Austria) P Oswald	4	5
2	(Poland) M Fyrstenberg (Poland) M Matkowski	6	7

Quarterfinals
1	(Israel) J Erlich (Israel) A Ram	6	6
(Argentina) M García (Germany) M Kohlmann	1	4
4	(Czech Republic) P Pála (Czech Republic) P Vízner	6	6
(Austria) O Marach (Czech Republic) C Suk	4	2
(Argentina) D Nalbandian (Argentina) S Prieto	6	4	[4]
3	(Austria) J Knowle (Austria) J Melzer	1	6	[10]
(Argentina) A Calleri (Chile) F González	2	7^{7}	[10]
2	(Poland) M Fyrstenberg (Poland) M Matkowski	6	6^{5}	[3]

Semifinals
1	(Israel) J Erlich (Israel) A Ram	4	6	[9]
4	(Czech Republic) P Pála (Czech Republic) P Vízner	6	4	[11]
3	(Austria) J Knowle (Austria) J Melzer	w/o
(Argentina) A Calleri (Chile) F González

Final
4	(Czech Republic) P Pála (Czech Republic) P Vízner	6	3	[12]
3	(Austria) J Knowle (Austria) J Melzer	4	6	[10]
