= 2007 BA-CA-TennisTrophy – Singles =

Singles
- 2007 BA-CA-TennisTrophy

Final
- Champion: (Serbia) Novak Djokovic
- Runner-up: (Switzerland) Stanislas Wawrinka
- Score: 6–4, 6–0

Details
- Draw: 32
- Seeds: 8

Events
Singles	Doubles
← 2006 ·	Vienna Open	· 2008 →

Novak Djokovic defeated Stanislas Wawrinka in the final, 6–4, 6–0. He saved two match points en route to the title, in the quarterfinals against Juan Ignacio Chela.

Ivan Ljubičić was the defending champion, but lost in the quarterfinals to Andreas Seppi.

== Seeds ==
1. (Serbia) Novak Djokovic (champion)
2. (Chile) Fernando González (quarterfinals)
3. (Croatia) Ivan Ljubičić (quarterfinals)
4. (France) Richard Gasquet (withdrew due to fatigue)
5. (Argentina) Guillermo Cañas (first round)
6. (Spain) Carlos Moyá (first round)
7. (Argentina) Juan Ignacio Chela (quarterfinals)
8. (Cyprus) Marcos Baghdatis (first round)

== Draw ==
=== Key ===
- Q = Qualifier
- WC = Wild card
- LL = Lucky loser
- Alt = Alternate
- SE = Special exempt
- PR = Protected ranking
- ITF = ITF entry
- JE = Junior exempt
- w/o = Walkover
- r = Retired
- d = Defaulted
- SR = Special ranking

=== Finals ===
Semifinals
1	(Serbia) Novak Djokovic	6	6
(Italy) Andreas Seppi	4	3
(Switzerland) Stanislas Wawrinka	7	6
(Spain) Juan Carlos Ferrero	5	1

Final
1	(Serbia) Novak Djokovic	6	6
(Switzerland) Stanislas Wawrinka	4	0

=== Top half ===
First round
1	(Serbia) N Djokovic	6	6
(United States) R Ginepri	3	4
LL	(Czech Republic) T Zíb	6	6
(Germany) F Mayer	1	4
(Austria) J Melzer	6	6
WC	(Austria) A Peya	4	3
(Spain) G García López	1	3
7	(Argentina) JI Chela	6	6
3	(Croatia) I Ljubičić	6	7
Q	(Austria) A Haider-Maurer	4	5
(United States) M Fish	6^{4}	6	6
(Spain) N Almagro	7^{7}	2	4
(Argentina) A Calleri	6	3	3
(Netherlands) R Haase	4	6	6
(Italy) A Seppi	6	6
8	(Cyprus) M Baghdatis	2	2

Second round
1	(Serbia) N Djokovic	6	6
LL	(Czech Republic) T Zíb	4	4
(Austria) J Melzer	6	3	2
7	(Argentina) JI Chela	4	6	6
3	(Croatia) I Ljubičić	6^{4}	6	7^{7}
(United States) M Fish	7^{7}	2	6^{4}
(Netherlands) R Haase	5	3
(Italy) A Seppi	7	6

Quarterfinals
1	(Serbia) N Djokovic	6	5	7^{7}
7	(Argentina) JI Chela	3	7	6^{2}
3	(Croatia) I Ljubičić	3	3
(Italy) A Seppi	6	6

Semifinals
1	(Serbia) N Djokovic	6	6
(Italy) A Seppi	4	3

=== Bottom half ===
First round
6/WC	(Spain) C Moyá	6^{3}	7	2
(Austria) S Koubek	7^{7}	5	6
(Spain) F López	6	6
(Austria) W Eschauer	3	2
(France) M Gicquel	6	3	4
(Switzerland) S Wawrinka	4	6	6
(Argentina) D Nalbandian	6	7^{7}
Q	(Italy) S Galvani	3	6^{3}
5/WC	(Argentina) G Cañas	6	3	6^{5}
(Spain) JC Ferrero	3	6	7^{7}
Q	(Czech Republic) I Minář	4	2
(France) J Benneteau	6	6
Q	(Croatia) R Karanušić	7^{7}	4	6^{3}
(Czech Republic) J Vaněk	6^{1}	6	7^{7}
(Italy) F Volandri	6	1	3
2	(Chile) F González	3	6	6

Second round
(Austria) S Koubek	4	6	4
(Spain) F López	6	3	6
(Switzerland) S Wawrinka	5	6	6
(Argentina) D Nalbandian	7	3	1
(Spain) JC Ferrero	7^{7}	1	6
(France) J Benneteau	6^{2}	6	2
(Czech Republic) J Vaněk	3	4
2	(Chile) F González	6	6

Quarterfinals
(Spain) F López	7^{10}	3	4
(Switzerland) S Wawrinka	6^{8}	6	6
(Spain) JC Ferrero	6	4	6
2	(Chile) F González	3	6	4

Semifinals
(Switzerland) S Wawrinka	7	6
(Spain) JC Ferrero	5	1
