= 1990 CA-TennisTrophy – Singles =

Singles
- 1990 CA-TennisTrophy

Final
- Champion: (Sweden) Anders Järryd
- Runner-up: (Austria) Horst Skoff
- Score: 6–3, 6–3, 6–1

Details
- Draw: 32
- Seeds: 8

Events
Singles	Doubles
← 1989 ·	Vienna Open	· 1991 →

Paul Annacone was the defending champion but lost in the second round to Thomas Muster.

Anders Järryd won in the final 6–3, 6–3, 6–1 against Horst Skoff.

== Seeds ==
1. (Austria) Thomas Muster (semifinals)
2. (United States) John McEnroe (quarterfinals)
3. (Argentina) Martín Jaite (quarterfinals)
4. (Austria) Horst Skoff (final)
5. (Germany) Carl-Uwe Steeb (second round)
6. (Soviet Union) Alexander Volkov (semifinals)
7. (United States) Jimmy Arias (second round)
8. (Germany) Michael Stich (first round)

== Draw ==
=== Key ===
- Q = Qualifier
- WC = Wild card
- LL = Lucky loser
- Alt = Alternate
- ITF = ITF entry
- PR = Protected ranking
- SR = Special ranking
- SE = Special exempt
- JE = Junior exempt
- JR = Junior Accelerator Programme entrant
- CO = College Accelerator Programme entrant
- NG = Next Gen Accelerator Program entrant
- w/o = Walkover
- r = Retired
- d = Defaulted

=== Final ===
Semifinals
1	(Austria) Thomas Muster	2	6
4	(Austria) Horst Skoff	6	7
6	(Soviet Union) Alexander Volkov	2	5
(Sweden) Anders Järryd	6	7

Final
4	(Austria) Horst Skoff	3	3	1
(Sweden) Anders Järryd	6	6	6

=== Section 1 ===
First round
1	(Austria) T Muster	7	6
(Czechoslovakia) M Střelba	6	4
(United States) P Annacone	7	7
(United States) J Tarango	5	6
Q	(Soviet Union) A Olhovskiy	6	6
(France) O Delaître	0	3
(United Kingdom) J Bates	5	4
7	(United States) J Arias	7	6
4	(Austria) H Skoff	3	7	6
(Austria) A Antonitsch	6	5	2
WC	(Austria) R Wawra	2	4
Q	(Ukrainian Soviet Socialist Republic) D Poliakov	6	6
(Germany) M Sinner	2	6
(Sweden) L Jonsson	6	7
(Argentina) R Azar	3	3
WC/5	(Germany) C-U Steeb	6	6

Second round
1	(Austria) T Muster	3	7	7
(United States) P Annacone	6	6	6
Q	(Soviet Union) A Olhovskiy	7	6
7	(United States) J Arias	5	4
4	(Austria) H Skoff	6	6	6
Q	(Ukrainian Soviet Socialist Republic) D Poliakov	7	4	2
(Sweden) L Jonsson	6	6
WC/5	(Germany) C-U Steeb	3	3

Quarterfinals
1	(Austria) T Muster	0	6	7
Q	(Soviet Union) A Olhovskiy	6	4	6
4	(Austria) H Skoff	6	6
(Sweden) L Jonsson	4	3

Semifinals
1	(Austria) T Muster	2	6
4	(Austria) H Skoff	6	7

=== Section 2 ===
First round
6	(Soviet Union) A Volkov	7	6
(Sweden) T Högstedt	6	4
(Germany) J Wöhrmann	7	6
Q	(Austria) H Mair	5	1
Q	(Netherlands) J Siemerink	4	7	6
WC	(United States) P McEnroe	6	5	3
(Spain) T Carbonell	6	4
3	(Argentina) M Jaite	7	6
8	(Germany) M Stich	5	2
(Sweden) A Järryd	7	6
(Portugal) J Cunha Silva	6	3
(Germany) P Kühnen	7	6
(Sweden) J Gunnarsson	6	6	6
(Germany) U Riglewski	7	3	7
(United States) B Garrow	6	6	4
2	(United States) J McEnroe	4	7	6

Second round
6	(Soviet Union) A Volkov	7	6
(Germany) J Wöhrmann	5	3
Q	(Netherlands) J Siemerink	3	3
3	(Argentina) M Jaite	6	6
(Sweden) A Järryd	6	6
(Germany) P Kühnen	3	4
(Germany) U Riglewski	7	4	3
2	(United States) P McEnroe	6	6	6

Quarterfinals
6	(Soviet Union) A Volkov	6	6
3	(Argentina) M Jaite	2	1
(Sweden) A Järryd	7	6
2	(United States) J McEnroe	6	2

Semifinals
6	(Soviet Union) A Volkov	2	5
(Sweden) A Järryd	6	7
