= 1990 CA-TennisTrophy – Doubles =

Doubles
- 1990 CA-TennisTrophy

Final
- Champions: (Germany) Udo Riglewski (Germany) Michael Stich
- Runners-up: (Mexico) Jorge Lozano (United States) Todd Witsken
- Score: 6–4, 6–4

Details
- Draw: 16
- Seeds: 4

Events
Singles	Doubles
← 1989 ·	Vienna Open	· 1991 →

Jan Gunnarsson and Anders Järryd were the defending champions but lost in the first round to Jeff Brown and Scott Melville.

Udo Riglewski and Michael Stich won in the final 6–4, 6–4 against Jorge Lozano and Todd Witsken.

== Seeds ==
1. (United States) Rick Leach / (United States) Jim Pugh (first round)
2. (Mexico) Jorge Lozano / (United States) Todd Witsken (final)
3. (Germany) Udo Riglewski / (Germany) Michael Stich (champions)
4. (United Kingdom) Jeremy Bates / (United Kingdom) Andrew Castle (semifinals)

== Draw ==
=== Key ===
- Q = Qualifier
- WC = Wild card
- LL = Lucky loser
- Alt = Alternate
- SE = Special exempt
- PR = Protected ranking
- ITF = ITF entry
- JE = Junior exempt
- w/o = Walkover
- r = Retired
- d = Defaulted
- SR = Special ranking

First round
1	(United States) R Leach (United States) J Pugh	7	4	4
(United States) P Annacone (United States) J Arias	6	6	6
(Sweden) J Gunnarsson (Sweden) A Järryd	6	6	4
(United States) J Brown (United States) S Melville	7	3	6
3	(Germany) U Riglewski (Germany) M Stich	6	6	6
(Mexico) L Lavalle (Venezuela) N Pereira	7	3	2
(Australia) N Borwick (Soviet Union) A Olhovskiy	7	3	6
Q	(Netherlands) S Groen (Netherlands) J Siemerink	6	6	4
(Portugal) J Cunha Silva (Ukrainian Soviet Socialist Republic) D Poliakov	5	4
(Austria) A Antonitsch (Austria) T Muster	7	6
(Czechoslovakia) V Flegl (Czechoslovakia) D Vacek	2	6	1
4	(United Kingdom) J Bates (United Kingdom) A Castle	6	3	6
(Czechoslovakia) J Čihák (Argentina) M Jaite	1	3
WC	(Austria) H Skoff (Soviet Union) A Volkov	6	6
(United States) B Garrow (United States) S Salumaa	0	7	3
2	(Mexico) J Lozano (United States) T Witsken	6	6	6

Quarterfinals
(United States) P Annacone (United States) J Arias	6	3	6
(United States) J Brown (United States) S Melville	4	6	1
3	(Germany) U Riglewski (Germany) M Stich	7	6
(Australia) N Borwick (Soviet Union) A Olhovskiy	6	3
(Austria) A Antonitsch (Austria) T Muster
4	(United Kingdom) J Bates (United Kingdom) A Castle	w/o
WC	(Austria) H Skoff (Soviet Union) A Volkov	4	2
2	(Mexico) J Lozano (United States) T Witsken	6	6

Semifinals
(United States) P Annacone (United States) J Arias	6	7	4
3	(Germany) U Riglewski (Germany) M Stich	7	6	6
4	(United Kingdom) J Bates (United Kingdom) A Castle	1	3
2	(Mexico) J Lozano (United States) T Witsken	6	6

Final
3	(Germany) U Riglewski (Germany) M Stich	6	6
2	(Mexico) J Lozano (United States) T Witsken	4	4
