= 1991 CA-TennisTrophy – Doubles =

Doubles
- 1991 CA-TennisTrophy

Final
- Champions: (Sweden) Anders Järryd (South Africa) Gary Muller
- Runners-up: (Switzerland) Jakob Hlasek (United States) Patrick McEnroe
- Score: 6–4, 7–5

Details
- Draw: 16
- Seeds: 4

Events
Singles	Doubles
← 1990 ·	Vienna Open	· 1992 →

Udo Riglewski and Michael Stich were the defending champions of the doubles event at the CA-TennisTrophy tennis tournament but lost in the semifinals to Jakob Hlasek and Patrick McEnroe. Anders Järryd and Gary Muller won in the final 6–4, 7–5 against Hlasek and McEnroe.

== Seeds ==
1. (Switzerland) Jakob Hlasek / (United States) Patrick McEnroe (final)
2. (Sweden) Anders Järryd / (South Africa) Gary Muller (champions)
3. (Germany) Udo Riglewski / (Germany) Michael Stich (semifinals)
4. (Argentina) Javier Frana / (Mexico) Leonardo Lavalle (first round)

== Draw ==
=== Key ===
- Q = Qualifier
- WC = Wild card
- LL = Lucky loser
- Alt = Alternate
- ITF = ITF entry
- PR = Protected ranking
- SR = Special ranking
- SE = Special exempt
- JE = Junior exempt
- JR = Junior Accelerator Programme entrant
- CO = College Accelerator Programme entrant
- NG = Next Gen Accelerator Program entrant
- w/o = Walkover
- r = Retired
- d = Defaulted

First round
1	(Switzerland) J Hlasek (United States) P McEnroe	6	6	6
WC	(Austria) A Antonitsch (Austria) H Skoff	7	4	2
(Brazil) R Acioly (Brazil) N Aerts	6	3
(Australia) M Kratzmann (Australia) J Stoltenberg	7	6
3	(Germany) U Riglewski (Germany) M Stich	6	6
(Czechoslovakia) V Flegl (Czechoslovakia) M Šrejber	4	4
(Netherlands) R Krajicek (Netherlands) J Siemerink	7	3	6
(Sweden) N Holm (Sweden) O Jonsson	6	6	0
(Germany) E Jelen (Germany) C-U Steeb	6	7
(Croatia) G Prpić (Spain) V Solves	3	5
(Czechoslovakia) B Stanković (Czechoslovakia) R Vogel	6	7
4	(Argentina) J Frana (Mexico) L Lavalle	3	6
Q	(Soviet Union) A Cherkasov (Soviet Union) A Volkov	6	6
(Netherlands) M Oosting (Finland) O Rahnasto	3	4
(Australia) N Borwick (United States) S Patridge	3	4
2	(Sweden) A Järryd (South Africa) G Muller	6	6

Quarterfinals
1	(Switzerland) J Hlasek (United States) P McEnroe	6	7
(Australia) M Kratzmann (Australia) J Stoltenberg	3	6
3	(Germany) U Riglewski (Germany) M Stich	w/o
(Netherlands) R Krajicek (Netherlands) J Siemerink
(Germany) E Jelen (Germany) C-U Steeb	6	7
(Czechoslovakia) B Stanković (Czechoslovakia) R Vogel	2	6
Q	(Soviet Union) A Cherkasov (Soviet Union) A Volkov	4	4
2	(Sweden) A Järryd (South Africa) G Muller	6	6

Semifinals
1	(Switzerland) J Hlasek (United States) P McEnroe	7	6
3	(Germany) U Riglewski (Germany) M Stich	6	2
(Germany) E Jelen (Germany) C-U Steeb	2	3
2	(Sweden) A Järryd (South Africa) G Muller	6	6

Final
1	(Switzerland) J Hlasek (United States) P McEnroe	4	5
2	(Sweden) A Järryd (South Africa) G Muller	6	7
