= 2009 Bank Austria-TennisTrophy =

- Date: 24 October – 1 November
- Edition: 35th
- Category: ATP World Tour 250 Series
- Draw: 32S / 16D
- Surface: Hard / indoor
- Location: Vienna, Austria
- Venue: Wiener Stadthalle

Champions

Singles
- (Austria) Jürgen Melzer

Doubles
- (Poland) Łukasz Kubot / (Austria) Oliver Marach
- Vienna Open

The 2009 Bank Austria-TennisTrophy was a tennis tournament played on indoor hard courts. It was the 35th edition of the event known that year as the Bank Austria-TennisTrophy, and was part of the ATP World Tour 250 Series of the 2009 ATP World Tour. It was held at the Wiener Stadthalle in Vienna, Austria, from October 24 through November 1, 2009.

== Finals ==
=== Singles ===
(Austria) Jürgen Melzer defeated (Croatia) Marin Čilić 6–4, 6–3

- It was Melzer's first title of the year and 2nd of his career.

=== Doubles ===
(Poland) Łukasz Kubot / (Austria) Oliver Marach defeated (Austria) Julian Knowle / (Austria) Jürgen Melzer 2–6, 6–4, [11–9]

== Entrants ==
=== Seeds ===
Country	Player	Rank^{1}	Seed
CRO	Marin Čilić	13	1
CZE	Radek Štěpánek	14	2
FRA	Gaël Monfils	15	3
GER	Philipp Kohlschreiber	25	4
ESP	Nicolás Almagro	27	5
ESP	Feliciano López	34	6
AUT	Jürgen Melzer	39	7
USA	John Isner	42	8

- Seeds are based on the rankings of October 19, 2009

=== Other entrants ===
The following players received wildcards into the singles main draw:

- (Austria) Andreas Haider-Maurer
- (Austria) Stefan Koubek

The following players received entry from the qualifying draw:

- (Colombia) Alejandro Falla
- (Slovakia) Dominik Hrbatý
- (Germany) Dieter Kindlmann
- (Czech Republic) Lukáš Rosol

The following players received lucky losers into the singles main draw:

- (Germany) Michael Berrer
