= 1992 CA-TennisTrophy – Doubles =

Doubles
- 1992 CA-TennisTrophy

Final
- Champions: (Sweden) Ronnie Båthman (Sweden) Anders Järryd
- Runners-up: (United States) Kent Kinnear (Germany) Udo Riglewski
- Score: 6–3, 7–5

Details
- Draw: 16
- Seeds: 4

Events
Singles	Doubles
← 1991 ·	Vienna Open	· 1993 →

Anders Järryd and Gary Muller were the defending champions but only Järryd competed that year with Ronnie Båthman.

Båthman and Järryd won in the final 6–3, 7–5 against Kent Kinnear and Udo Riglewski.

== Seeds ==
1. (United States) Luke Jensen / (Australia) Laurie Warder (quarterfinals)
2. (Sweden) Ronnie Båthman / (Sweden) Anders Järryd (champions)
3. (Netherlands) Jacco Eltingh / (Netherlands) Tom Kempers (semifinals)
4. (United States) Kent Kinnear / (Germany) Udo Riglewski (final)

== Draw ==
=== Key ===
- Q = Qualifier
- WC = Wild card
- LL = Lucky loser
- Alt = Alternate
- ITF = ITF entry
- PR = Protected ranking
- SR = Special ranking
- SE = Special exempt
- JE = Junior exempt
- JR = Junior Accelerator Programme entrant
- CO = College Accelerator Programme entrant
- NG = Next Gen Accelerator Program entrant
- w/o = Walkover
- r = Retired
- d = Defaulted

First round
1	(United States) L Jensen (Australia) L Warder	7	6
(Finland) O Rahnasto (Kenya) P Wekesa	5	3
(Netherlands) M Oosting (Netherlands) J Siemerink	6	6
(Germany) M Naewie (Germany) D Prinosil	4	3
4	(United States) K Kinnear (Germany) U Riglewski	6	7
Q	(Spain) J C Báguena (Italy) S Pescosolido	4	6
(Sweden) J Donar (Sweden) O Jonsson	6	6
WC	(Austria) T Prerovsky (Austria) T Muster	2	3
(South Africa) B Haygarth (Czechoslovakia) D Rikl	6	6
(United States) B Devening (Czechoslovakia) R Vogel	2	2
(Netherlands) S Groen (Germany) A Thoms	6	6
3	(Netherlands) J Eltingh (Netherlands) T Kempers	7	7
(Czechoslovakia) T Anzari (Czechoslovakia) V Flegl	6	6
WC	(Austria) A Antonitsch (Austria) G Mandl	4	4
(Netherlands) P Haarhuis (United States) T Nelson	5	3
2	(Sweden) R Båthman (Sweden) A Järryd	7	6

Quarterfinals
1	(United States) L Jensen (Australia) L Warder	4	6
(Netherlands) M Oosting (Netherlands) J Siemerink	6	7
4	(United States) K Kinnear (Germany) U Riglewski	7	4	7
(Sweden) J Donar (Sweden) O Jonsson	6	6	5
(South Africa) B Haygarth (Czechoslovakia) D Rikl	3	5
3	(Netherlands) J Eltingh (Netherlands) T Kempers	6	7
(Czechoslovakia) T Anzari (Czechoslovakia) V Flegl	3	5
2	(Sweden) R Båthman (Sweden) A Järryd	6	7

Semifinals
(Netherlands) M Oosting (Netherlands) J Siemerink	3	4
4	(United States) K Kinnear (Germany) U Riglewski	6	6
3	(Netherlands) J Eltingh (Netherlands) T Kempers	3	4
2	(Sweden) R Båthman (Sweden) A Järryd	6	6

Final
4	(United States) K Kinnear (Germany) U Riglewski	3	5
2	(Sweden) R Båthman (Sweden) A Järryd	6	7
