= 1992 CA-TennisTrophy =

- Date: 19–26 October
- Edition: 18th
- Category: World Series (Free Week)
- Draw: 32S / 16D
- Prize money: $280,000
- Surface: Carpet / indoor
- Location: Vienna, Austria
- Venue: Wiener Stadthalle

Champions

Singles
- (Czechoslovakia) Petr Korda

Doubles
- (Sweden) Ronnie Båthman / (Sweden) Anders Järryd
- Vienna Open

The 1992 CA-TennisTrophy was a men's tennis tournament played on indoor carpet courts at the Wiener Stadthalle in Vienna in Austria and was part of the World Series of the 1992 ATP Tour. It was the 18th edition of the tournament and took place from 19 October until 26 October 1992. First-seeded Petr Korda won the singles title.

== Finals ==
=== Singles ===
(Czechoslovakia) Petr Korda defeated (Italy) Gianluca Pozzi 6–3, 6–2, 5–7, 6–1

- It was Korda's 3rd title of the year and the 11th of his career.

=== Doubles ===
(Sweden) Ronnie Båthman / (Sweden) Anders Järryd defeated (United States) Kent Kinnear / (Germany) Udo Riglewski 6–3, 7–5

- It was Båthman's only title of the year and the 3rd of his career. It was Järryd's 3rd title of the year and the 58th of his career.
