= Thomas Gollwitzer =

German tennis player

- Full name: Thomas Gollwitzer
- Country (sports): West Germany; Germany
- Born: 24 July 1966 (age 58); Deggendorf, West Germany
- Plays: Right-handed
- Prize money: $85,217

Singles
- Career record: 5–7
- Career titles: 0
- Highest ranking: No. 159 (19 September 1994)

Doubles
- Career record: 0–1
- Career titles: 0
- Highest ranking: No. 238 (16 May 1994)

Thomas Gollwitzer (born 24 July 1966) is a former professional tennis player from Germany.

== Biography ==
Gollwitzer, the eldest son of architect Hans and gym teacher Lisbeth, was born in Deggendorf, West Germany. He began playing tennis aged eight and turned professional in 1991. As a qualifier at the 1992 CA-TennisTrophy in Vienna he made it to the quarter-finals, in a run which included a win over world number 26 Andrei Cherkasov. He also reached the quarter-finals at Bolzano in 1993 as a qualifier and overcame fourth seed Arnaud Boetsch en route, who retired hurt with the German close to victory. Other ATP Tour main draw appearances include two top-tier tournaments. At Monte Carlo in 1994 he lost in the opening round to Stefan Edberg and he also played in the first round at Hamburg.
