= 1989 CA-TennisTrophy – Doubles =

Doubles
- 1989 CA-TennisTrophy

Final
- Champions: (Sweden) Jan Gunnarsson (Sweden) Anders Järryd
- Runners-up: (United States) Paul Annacone (New Zealand) Kelly Evernden
- Score: 6–2, 6–3

Details
- Draw: 16
- Seeds: 4

Events
Singles	Doubles
← 1988 ·	Vienna Open	· 1990 →

Alex Antonitsch and Balázs Taróczy were the defending champions but lost in the semifinals to Jan Gunnarsson and Anders Järryd.

Gunnarsson and Järryd won in the final 6–2, 6–3 against Paul Annacone and Kelly Evernden.

== Seeds ==
1. (United States) Paul Annacone / (New Zealand) Kelly Evernden (final)
2. (Austria) Alex Antonitsch / (Hungary) Balázs Taróczy (semifinals)
3. (Italy) Omar Camporese / (Italy) Diego Nargiso (quarterfinals)
4. (Sweden) Jan Gunnarsson / (Sweden) Anders Järryd (champions)

== Draw ==
=== Key ===
- Q = Qualifier
- WC = Wild card
- LL = Lucky loser
- Alt = Alternate
- SE = Special exempt
- PR = Protected ranking
- ITF = ITF entry
- JE = Junior exempt
- w/o = Walkover
- r = Retired
- d = Defaulted
- SR = Special ranking

First round
1	(United States) P Annacone (New Zealand) K Evernden	6	6	7
(Socialist Federal Republic of Yugoslavia) G Ivanišević (Austria) H Skoff	3	7	5
(West Germany) M Sinner (West Germany) M Stich	6	7
(Peru) C di Laura (Venezuela) N Pereira	2	5
3	(Italy) O Camporese (Italy) D Nargiso	4	7	6
(Czechoslovakia) J Navrátil (Czechoslovakia) M Vajda	6	6	1
(West Germany) R Osterthun (West Germany) U Riglewski	3	4
(United States) T Nelson (The Bahamas) R Smith	6	6
(West Germany) R Haas (Socialist Federal Republic of Yugoslavia) G Prpić	7	4	6
(United States) G Layendecker (Austria) T Muster	5	6	3
(Spain) J Arrese (Spain) J Clavet	4	6
4	(Sweden) J Gunnarsson (Sweden) A Järryd	6	7
(United States) J Canter (United States) B Willenborg	6	5	5
(Switzerland) H Günthardt (Denmark) M Mortensen	4	7	7
(Austria) T Buchmayer (Austria) R Wawra	2	6
2	(Austria) A Antonitsch (Hungary) B Taróczy	6	7

Quarterfinals
1	(United States) P Annacone (New Zealand) K Evernden	5	6	6
(West Germany) M Sinner (West Germany) M Stich	7	4	1
3	(Italy) O Camporese (Italy) D Nargiso	6	6	2
(United States) T Nelson (The Bahamas) R Smith	1	7	6
(West Germany) R Haas (Socialist Federal Republic of Yugoslavia) G Prpić	6	3
4	(Sweden) J Gunnarsson (Sweden) A Järryd	7	6
(Switzerland) H Günthardt (Denmark) M Mortensen	7	2	3
2	(Austria) A Antonitsch (Hungary) B Taróczy	6	6	6

Semifinals
1	(United States) P Annacone (New Zealand) K Evernden	6	7
(United States) T Nelson (The Bahamas) R Smith	1	6
4	(Sweden) J Gunnarsson (Sweden) A Järryd	6	6
2	(Austria) A Antonitsch (Hungary) B Taróczy	4	3

Final
1	(United States) P Annacone (New Zealand) K Evernden	2	3
4	(Sweden) J Gunnarsson (Sweden) A Järryd	6	6
