= 2007 BA-CA-TennisTrophy =

- Date: 7–14 October
- Edition: 33rd
- Category: International Series Gold
- Surface: Hard / indoor
- Location: Vienna, Austria
- Venue: Wiener Stadthalle

Champions

Singles
- (Serbia) Novak Djokovic

Doubles
- (Poland) Mariusz Fyrstenberg / (Poland) Marcin Matkowski
- Vienna Open

The 2007 BA-CA-TennisTrophy was a men's tennis tournament played on indoor hard courts. It was the 33rd edition of the event known that year as the BA-CA-TennisTrophy, and was part of the International Series Gold of the 2007 ATP Tour. It took place at the Wiener Stadthalle in Vienna, Austria, from 7 October through 14 October 2007.

The singles featured ATP No. 3, US Open runner-up, Miami and Canada Masters, Adelaide and Estoril winner Novak Djokovic, Australian Open and Rome Masters finalist, Beijing winner Fernando González, and Doha, 's-Hertogenbosch titlist Ivan Ljubičić. Also lined up were Wimbledon semifinalist, Mumbai winner Richard Gasquet, Costa do Sauípe titlist Guillermo Cañas, Carlos Moyá, Juan Ignacio Chela and Marcos Baghdatis.

First-seeded Novak Djokovic won the singles title.

== Finals ==
=== Singles ===
(Serbia) Novak Djokovic defeated (Switzerland) Stanislas Wawrinka 6–4, 6–0

- It was Djokovic's 5th singles title of the year and the 7th of his career.

=== Doubles ===
(Poland) Mariusz Fyrstenberg / (Poland) Marcin Matkowski defeated (Germany) Tomas Behrend / (Germany) Christopher Kas 6–4, 6–2
