= 1991 CA-TennisTrophy – Singles =

Singles
- 1991 CA-TennisTrophy

Final
- Champion: (Germany) Michael Stich
- Runner-up: (Netherlands) Jan Siemerink
- Score: 6–4, 6–4, 6–4

Details
- Draw: 32
- Seeds: 8

Events
Singles	Doubles
← 1990 ·	Vienna Open	· 1992 →

Anders Järryd was the defending champion of the singles event at the CA-TennisTrophy tennis tournament but lost in the quarterfinals to Michael Stich.

Stich won in the final 6–4, 6–4, 6–4 against Jan Siemerink.

== Seeds ==
1. (Germany) Michael Stich (champion)
2. (Switzerland) Jakob Hlasek (second round)
3. (Czechoslovakia) Petr Korda (semifinals)
4. (Croatia) Goran Prpić (first round)
5. (Soviet Union) Andrei Cherkasov (second round)
6. (Soviet Union) Alexander Volkov (second round)
7. (Austria) Horst Skoff (quarterfinals)
8. (Sweden) Anders Järryd (quarterfinals)

== Draw ==
=== Key ===
- Q = Qualifier
- WC = Wild card
- LL = Lucky loser
- Alt = Alternate
- SE = Special exempt
- PR = Protected ranking
- ITF = ITF entry
- JE = Junior exempt
- w/o = Walkover
- r = Retired
- d = Defaulted
- SR = Special ranking

=== Final ===
Semifinals
1	(Germany) Michael Stich	6	2	6
3	(Czechoslovakia) Petr Korda	4	6	2
(Germany) Carl-Uwe Steeb	3	4
(Netherlands) Jan Siemerink	6	6

Final
1	(Germany) Michael Stich	6	6	6
(Netherlands) Jan Siemerink	4	4	4

=== Section 1 ===
First round
1	(Germany) M Stich	6	6
(Mexico) L Lavalle	3	4
(United States) P McEnroe	7	6
(South Africa) G Muller	5	3
WC	(Austria) G Mandl	4	2
(Germany) E Jelen	6	6
(Italy) C Pistolesi	1	2
8	(Sweden) A Järryd	6	6
3	(Czechoslovakia) P Korda	4	6	6
Q	(United States) A Hombrecher	6	1	2
(Sweden) L Jönsson	1	7^{7}	6
(Czechoslovakia) M Vajda	6	6^{2}	4
(United States) A Krickstein	6	6
Q	(Sweden) T Högstedt	3	2
(Israel) A Mansdorf	6^{6}	7^{7}	6^{5}
5	(Soviet Union) A Cherkasov	7^{8}	6^{2}	7^{7}

Second round
1	(Germany) M Stich	6	6
(United States) P McEnroe	3	4
(Germany) E Jelen	6^{5}	3
8	(Sweden) A Järryd	7^{7}	6
3	(Czechoslovakia) P Korda	6	6
(Sweden) L Jönsson	2	4
(United States) A Krickstein	6	6
5	(Soviet Union) A Cherkasov	3	4

Quarterfinals
1	(Germany) M Stich	6	6
8	(Sweden) A Järryd	2	1
3	(Czechoslovakia) P Korda	4	6	6
(United States) A Krickstein	6	2	1

Semifinals
1	(Germany) M Stich	6	2	6
3	(Czechoslovakia) P Korda	4	6	2

=== Section 2 ===
First round
6	(Soviet Union) A Volkov	6	6
(Germany) M Zoecke	3	2
Q	(Sweden) D Engel	4	3
(Germany) C-U Steeb	6	6
WC	(Austria) T Buchmayer	7^{7}	6^{8}	4
(Netherlands) R Krajicek	6^{3}	7^{10}	6
(Argentina) J Frana	6	6
4	(Croatia) G Prpić	1	1
7	(Austria) H Skoff	7^{7}	4	6
(Argentina) R Azar	6^{4}	6	3
WC	(Austria) A Antonitsch	3	3
(Germany) P Baur	6	6
Q	(Germany) P Vojtíšek	4	3
(Netherlands) J Siemerink	6	6
(Italy) C Caratti	2	2
2	(Switzerland) J Hlasek	6	6

Second round
6	(Soviet Union) A Volkov	2	7^{7}	3
(Germany) C-U Steeb	6	6^{4}	6
(Netherlands) R Krajicek	6^{6}	6	6^{8}
(Argentina) J Frana	7^{8}	4	7^{10}
7	(Austria) H Skoff	5	6	6
(Germany) P Baur	7	3	1
(Netherlands) J Siemerink	6^{6}	7^{7}	6
2	(Switzerland) J Hlasek	7^{8}	6^{3}	3

Quarterfinals
(Germany) C-U Steeb	7^{10}	7
(Argentina) J Frana	6^{8}	5
7	(Austria) H Skoff	3	1
(Netherlands) J Siemerink	6	6

Semifinals
(Germany) C-U Steeb	3	4
(Netherlands) J Siemerink	6	6
