= 2015 Erste Bank Open – Singles =

Singles
- 2015 Erste Bank Open

Final
- Champion: (Spain) David Ferrer
- Runner-up: (United States) Steve Johnson
- Score: 4–6, 6–4, 7–5

Details
- Draw: 32
- Seeds: 8

Events
Singles	Doubles
- Vienna Open

Andy Murray was the defending champion, but chose not to participate.
David Ferrer won the title, defeating Steve Johnson in the final, 4–6, 6–4, 7–5.

== Seeds ==
1. (Spain) David Ferrer (champion)
2. (South Africa) Kevin Anderson (quarterfinals)
3. (United States) John Isner (second round)
4. (France) Jo-Wilfried Tsonga (second round)
5. (Austria) Dominic Thiem (first round)
6. (France) Gaël Monfils (semifinals)
7. (Croatia) Ivo Karlović (quarterfinals)
8. (Italy) Fabio Fognini (semifinals)

== Draw ==
Key

- Q = Qualifier
- WC = Wild card
- LL = Lucky loser
- Alt = Alternate
- ITF = ITF entry
- PR = Protected ranking
- SR = Special ranking
- SE = Special exempt
- JE = Junior exempt
- JR = Junior Accelerator Programme entrant
- CO = College Accelerator Programme entrant
- NG = Next Gen Accelerator Program entrant
- w/o = Walkover
- r = Retired
- d = Defaulted

=== Finals ===
Semifinals
1	(Spain) David Ferrer	7^{7}	7
6	(France) Gaël Monfils	6^{5}	5
(Latvia) Ernests Gulbis	3	6^{4}
(United States) Steve Johnson	6	7^{7}

Final
1	(Spain) David Ferrer	4	6	7
(United States) Steve Johnson	6	4	5

=== Top half ===
First round
1	(Spain) D Ferrer	1	6	6
(Spain) A Ramos Viñolas	6	3	4
(Colombia) S Giraldo	4	3
(Spain) G García López	6	6
PR	(Czech Republic) R Štěpánek	6	6
WC	(Austria) D Novak	4	3
(France) P-H Mathieu	4	6	3
8	(Italy) F Fognini	6	3	6
4	(France) J-W Tsonga	6	6^{3}	6
WC	(Germany) T Haas	3	7^{7}	4
(Czech Republic) L Rosol	6	7^{7}
Q	(Japan) Y Sugita	4	6^{2}
(United States) R Ram	7^{7}	1	4
(Italy) P Lorenzi	6^{4}	6	6
(Brazil) T Bellucci	7^{7}	3	4
6	(France) G Monfils	6^{5}	6	6

Second round
1	(Spain) D Ferrer	6	6
(Spain) G García López	1	1
PR	(Czech Republic) R Štěpánek	1	4
8	(Italy) F Fognini	6	6
4	(France) J-W Tsonga	4	6	1
(Czech Republic) L Rosol	6	3	6
(Italy) P Lorenzi	4	4
6	(France) G Monfils	6	6

Quarterfinals
1	(Spain) D Ferrer	6	6
8	(Italy) F Fognini	4	2
(Czech Republic) L Rosol	7^{7}	3	3
6	(France) G Monfils	6^{3}	6	6

Semifinals
1	(Spain) D Ferrer	7^{7}	7
6	(France) G Monfils	6^{5}	5

=== Bottom half ===
First round
7	(Croatia) I Karlović	7^{7}	6
(Italy) A Seppi	6^{5}	3
Q	(Germany) J-L Struff	4	4
(Ukraine) S Stakhovsky	6	6
(Latvia) E Gulbis	6	2	6
Q	(Austria) L Miedler	3	6	3
Q	(France) K de Schepper	6^{4}	6^{5}
3	(United States) J Isner	7^{7}	7^{7}
5	(Austria) D Thiem	6	6^{5}	4
(Poland) J Janowicz	2	7^{7}	6
(United States) S Johnson	6	4	6
(Ukraine) A Dolgopolov	3	6	2
(Czech Republic) J Veselý	6	6
WC	(Austria) G Melzer	4	3
(Austria) A Haider-Maurer	4	5
2	(South Africa) K Anderson	6	7

Second round
7	(Croatia) I Karlović	6	7
(Ukraine) S Stakhovsky	4	5
(Latvia) E Gulbis	6	4	6
3	(United States) J Isner	4	6	4
(Poland) J Janowicz	4	7^{9}	4
(United States) S Johnson	6	6^{7}	6
(Czech Republic) J Veselý	7^{7}	3	5
2	(South Africa) K Anderson	6^{4}	6	7

Quarterfinals
7	(Croatia) I Karlović	6^{4}	6^{5}
(Latvia) E Gulbis	7^{7}	7^{7}
(United States) S Johnson	5	7^{7}	6
2	(South Africa) K Anderson	7	6^{5}	4

Semifinals
(Latvia) E Gulbis	3	6^{4}
(United States) S Johnson	6	7^{7}

== Qualifying ==
=== Seeds ===
1. (Belgium) Ruben Bemelmans (qualifying competition)
2. (Georgia (country)) Nikoloz Basilashvili (qualifying competition)
3. (Germany) Jan-Lennard Struff (qualified)
4. (Germany) Michael Berrer (qualifying competition)
5. (France) Kenny de Schepper (qualified)
6. (Japan) Yūichi Sugita (qualified)
7. (Bosnia and Herzegovina) Mirza Bašić (first round)
8. (Italy) Riccardo Bellotti (first round)

=== Qualifiers ===
1. (France) Kenny de Schepper
2. (Japan) Yūichi Sugita
3. (Germany) Jan-Lennard Struff
4. (Austria) Lucas Miedler

=== Qualifying draw ===
==== First qualifier ====
First round				Qualifying competition
				1	(Belgium) Ruben Bemelmans	3	2
	(Switzerland) Marco Chiudinelli	3	3	5	(France) Kenny de Schepper	6	6
5	(France) Kenny de Schepper	6	6

==== Second qualifier ====
First round				Qualifying competition
				2	(Georgia (country)) Nikoloz Basilashvili	3	5
	(Spain) Jaume Munar	1	2	6	(Japan) Yūichi Sugita	6	7
6	(Japan) Yūichi Sugita	6	6

==== Third qualifier ====
First round
3	(Germany) Jan-Lennard Struff	5
(Serbia) Miljan Zekić	1^{r}
(Czech Republic) Jan Šátral	7^{7}	7^{7}
7	(Bosnia and Herzegovina) Mirza Bašić	6^{3}	6^{4}

Qualifying competition
3	(Germany) Jan-Lennard Struff	6	7^{11}
(Czech Republic) Jan Šátral	3	6^{9}

==== Fourth qualifier ====
First round
4	(Germany) Michael Berrer	6	6
WC	(Austria) Lenny Hampel	4	4
WC	(Austria) Lucas Miedler	3	6	6
8	(Italy) Riccardo Bellotti	6	4	4

Qualifying competition
4	(Germany) Michael Berrer	4	4
WC	(Austria) Lucas Miedler	6	6
