= 1989 CA-TennisTrophy – Singles =

Singles
- 1989 CA-TennisTrophy

Final
- Champion: (United States) Paul Annacone
- Runner-up: (New Zealand) Kelly Evernden
- Score: 6–7, 6–4, 6–1, 2–6, 6–3

Details
- Draw: 32
- Seeds: 8

Events
Singles	Doubles
← 1988 ·	Vienna Open	· 1990 →

Horst Skoff was the defending champion but lost in the second round to Glenn Layendecker.

Paul Annacone won in the final 6–7, 6–4, 6–1, 2–6, 6–3 against Kelly Evernden.

== Seeds ==
1. (United States) Jay Berger (quarterfinals)
2. (Austria) Thomas Muster (semifinals)
3. (Austria) Horst Skoff (second round)
4. (Italy) Paolo Canè (second round)
5. (Socialist Federal Republic of Yugoslavia) Goran Prpić (second round)
6. (Spain) Jordi Arrese (first round)
7. (Sweden) Anders Järryd (quarterfinals)
8. (Socialist Federal Republic of Yugoslavia) Goran Ivanišević (first round)

== Draw ==
=== Key ===
- Q = Qualifier
- WC = Wild card
- LL = Lucky loser
- Alt = Alternate
- SE = Special exempt
- PR = Protected ranking
- ITF = ITF entry
- JE = Junior exempt
- w/o = Walkover
- r = Retired
- d = Defaulted
- SR = Special ranking

=== Final ===
Semifinals
Q	(Czechoslovakia) Petr Korda	1	6
(United States) Paul Annacone	6	7
(New Zealand) Kelly Evernden	4	6	6
2	(Austria) Thomas Muster	6	2	3

Final
(United States) Paul Annacone	6	6	6	2	6
(New Zealand) Kelly Evernden	7	4	1	6	3

=== Section 1 ===
First round
1	(United States) J Berger	6	3	6
Q	(United States) J Canter	2	6	1
(Soviet Union) A Cherkasov	4	6	6
Q	(West Germany) C Geyer	6	3	7
Q	(Czechoslovakia) P Korda	6	7
(Czechoslovakia) M Šrejber	4	6
(Netherlands) M Schapers	6	7
8	(Socialist Federal Republic of Yugoslavia) G Ivanišević	3	6
3	(Austria) H Skoff	7	6
Q	(Czechoslovakia) J Navrátil	5	4
WC	(Austria) M Oberleitner	3	6
(United States) G Layendecker	6	7
(Sweden) J Gunnarsson	2	6	6
(Austria) A Antonitsch	6	3	4
(United States) P Annacone	6	6
6	(Spain) J Arrese	4	2

Second round
1	(United States) J Berger	6	6
Q	(West Germany) C Geyer	3	2
Q	(Czechoslovakia) P Korda	6	5	6
(Netherlands) M Schapers	4	7	4
3	(Austria) H Skoff	2	4
(United States) G Layendecker	6	6
(Sweden) J Gunnarsson	1	5
(United States) P Annacone	6	7

Quarterfinals
1	(United States) J Berger	6	6	3
Q	(Czechoslovakia) P Korda	3	7	6
(United States) G Layendecker	3	6
(United States) P Annacone	6	7

Semifinals
Q	(Czechoslovakia) P Korda	1	6
(United States) P Annacone	6	7

=== Section 2 ===
First round
5	(Socialist Federal Republic of Yugoslavia) G Prpić	6	6
(Socialist Federal Republic of Yugoslavia) B Orešar	3	4
(Soviet Union) A Volkov	7	6
(West Germany) M Stich	5	2
(New Zealand) K Evernden	6	6
(Venezuela) N Pereira	4	1
(Italy) D Nargiso	3	4
4	(Italy) P Canè	6	6
7	(Sweden) A Järryd	7	6
(Sweden) C Bergström	5	1
(Italy) O Camporese	4	4
(Czechoslovakia) M Vajda	6	6
LL	(West Germany) R Osterthun	4	2
WC	(Austria) T Buchmayer	6	6
WC	(Austria) M Bauer	4	2
2	(Austria) T Muster	6	6

Second round
5	(Socialist Federal Republic of Yugoslavia) G Prpić	6	7	3
(Soviet Union) A Volkov	7	5	6
(New Zealand) K Evernden	6	6
4	(Italy) P Canè	4	3
7	(Sweden) A Järryd	2	6	6
(Czechoslovakia) M Vajda	6	0	3
WC	(Austria) T Buchmayer	4	2
2	(Austria) T Muster	6	6

Quarterfinals
(Soviet Union) A Volkov	5	6	5
(New Zealand) K Evernden	7	4	7
7	(Sweden) A Järryd	4	4
2	(Austria) T Muster	6	6

Semifinals
(New Zealand) K Evernden	4	6	6
2	(Austria) T Muster	6	2	3
