= 2006 BA-CA-TennisTrophy – Singles =

Singles
- 2006 BA-CA-TennisTrophy

Final
- Champion: (Croatia) Ivan Ljubičić
- Runner-up: (Chile) Fernando González
- Score: 6–3, 6–4, 7–5

Details
- Draw: 32
- Seeds: 8

Events
Singles	Doubles
← 2005 ·	Vienna Open	· 2007 →

Ivan Ljubičić was the defending champion, and defended his title defeating Fernando González 6–3, 6–4, 7–5 in the final.

== Seeds ==
1. (Croatia) Ivan Ljubičić (champion)
2. (Argentina) David Nalbandian (quarterfinals)
3. (United States) Andy Roddick (semifinals)
4. (Cyprus) Marcos Baghdatis (second round)
5. (Chile) Fernando González (final)
6. (Germany) Tommy Haas (second round)
7. (Spain) Juan Carlos Ferrero (first round)
8. (Serbia) Novak Djokovic (second round)

== Draw ==
=== Key ===
- Q = Qualifier
- WC = Wild card
- LL = Lucky loser
- Alt = Alternate
- SE = Special exempt
- PR = Protected ranking
- ITF = ITF entry
- JE = Junior exempt
- w/o = Walkover
- r = Retired
- d = Defaulted
- SR = Special ranking

=== Finals ===
Semifinals
1	(Croatia) Ivan Ljubičić	6	6
(Slovakia) Dominik Hrbatý	1	4
3	(United States) Andy Roddick	4	6	6^{5}
5	(Chile) Fernando González	6	3	7^{7}

Final
1	(Croatia) Ivan Ljubičić	6	6	7
5	(Chile) Fernando González	3	4	5

=== Top half ===
First round
1	(Croatia) I Ljubičić	7^{7}	6
(Argentina) A Calleri	6^{3}	2
(Italy) A di Mauro	2	0
(Germany) F Mayer	6	6
Q	(Croatia) M Čilić	4	1
(Switzerland) S Wawrinka	6	6
LL	(Czech Republic) T Zíb	3	4
8	(Serbia) N Djokovic	6	6
4	(Cyprus) M Baghdatis	6	3	6
(Spain) R Ramírez Hidalgo	3	6	4
WC	(Austria) S Koubek	6	6
(Germany) D Gremelmayr	1	0
(Slovakia) D Hrbatý	6	6
Q	(Italy) S Bolelli	2	4
WC	(Austria) M Fischer	6^{3}	2
6	(Germany) T Haas	7^{7}	6

Second round
1	(Croatia) I Ljubičić	6	6
(Germany) F Mayer	3	3
(Switzerland) S Wawrinka	6	6
8	(Serbia) N Djokovic	3	3
4	(Cyprus) M Baghdatis	6	6^{3}	2
WC	(Austria) S Koubek	1	7^{7}	6
(Slovakia) D Hrbatý	6	4	6
6	(Germany) T Haas	3	6	0

Quarterfinals
1	(Croatia) I Ljubičić	6	6
(Switzerland) S Wawrinka	3	2
WC	(Austria) S Koubek	1	7	2
(Slovakia) D Hrbatý	6	5	6

Semifinals
1	(Croatia) I Ljubičić	6	6
(Slovakia) D Hrbatý	1	4

=== Bottom half ===
First round
7	(Spain) JC Ferrero	7	6^{5}	3
(Austria) J Melzer	5	7^{7}	6
Q	(Poland) Ł Kubot	6	6
(France) S Grosjean	4	3
(France) R Gasquet	7^{7}	6
Q	(Colombia) A Falla	6^{4}	3
(Argentina) J Acasuso	0	6^{2}
3	(United States) A Roddick	6	7^{7}
5	(Chile) F González	7^{8}	6
(France) G Simon	6^{6}	4
(Spain) C Moyá	3	6	7^{7}
(Spain) N Almagro	6	3	6^{3}
WC	(Austria) R Eitzinger	6	5	6^{6}
(Austria) O Marach	2	7	7^{8}
(Argentina) JI Chela	7^{8}	2	2
2	(Argentina) D Nalbandian	6^{6}	6	6

Second round
(Austria) J Melzer	6	3	6
Q	(Poland) Ł Kubot	4	6	1
(France) R Gasquet	7^{7}	1	3
3	(United States) A Roddick	6^{5}	6	6
5	(Chile) F González	6	6
(Spain) C Moyá	3	4
(Austria) O Marach	2	3
2	(Argentina) D Nalbandian	6	6

Quarterfinals
(Austria) J Melzer	4	3
3	(United States) A Roddick	6	6
5	(Chile) F González	3	6	6
2	(Argentina) D Nalbandian	6	3	1

Semifinals
3	(United States) A Roddick	4	6	6^{5}
5	(Chile) F González	6	3	7^{7}
