= 2007 BA-CA-TennisTrophy – Doubles =

Doubles
- 2007 BA-CA-TennisTrophy

Final
- Champions: (Poland) Mariusz Fyrstenberg (Poland) Marcin Matkowski
- Runners-up: (Germany) Tomas Behrend (Germany) Christopher Kas
- Score: 6–4, 6–2

Details
- Draw: 16
- Seeds: 4

Events
Singles	Doubles
- Vienna Open

Petr Pála and Pavel Vízner were the defending champions, but Vizner chose not to participate, and only Pala competed that year.
Pala partnered with David Škoch, but lost in the first round to Juan Ignacio Chela and Fernando González.

Mariusz Fyrstenberg and Marcin Matkowski won in the final 6–4, 6–2, against Tomas Behrend and Christopher Kas.

== Seeds ==
1. (Sweden) Simon Aspelin / (Austria) Julian Knowle (quarterfinals)
2. (Czech Republic) Martin Damm / (India) Leander Paes (semifinals)
3. (Israel) Jonathan Erlich / (Israel) Andy Ram (quarterfinals)
4. (Poland) Mariusz Fyrstenberg / (Poland) Marcin Matkowski (champions)

== Draw ==
Key

- Q = Qualifier
- WC = Wild card
- LL = Lucky loser
- Alt = Alternate
- ITF = ITF entry
- PR = Protected ranking
- SR = Special ranking
- SE = Special exempt
- JE = Junior exempt
- JR = Junior Accelerator Programme entrant
- CO = College Accelerator Programme entrant
- NG = Next Gen Accelerator Program entrant
- w/o = Walkover
- r = Retired
- d = Defaulted

=== Draw ===
First round
1	(Sweden) S Aspelin (Austria) J Knowle	7^{7}	3	[10]
WC	(Austria) W Eschauer (Austria) S Koubek	6^{3}	6	[6]
(Czech Republic) P Pála (Czech Republic) D Škoch	6^{4}	2
(Argentina) JI Chela (Chile) F González	7^{7}	6
3	(Israel) J Erlich (Israel) A Ram	4	6	[10]
(Argentina) M García (Argentina) S Prieto	6	2	[7]
(France) J Benneteau (Argentina) G Cañas	6	4	[5]
(Germany) T Behrend (Germany) C Kas	3	6	[10]
(Poland) L Kubot (Czech Republic) J Levinský	2	3
(Austria) J Melzer (Austria) A Peya	6	6
(Australia) J Kerr (United Kingdom) J Murray	4	1
4	(Poland) M Fyrstenberg (Poland) M Matkowski	6	6
WC	(Austria) M Fischer (Austria) P Oswald	6	2	[7]
(United States) M Fish (United States) R Ginepri	2	6	[10]
(Argentina) A Calleri (Italy) A Seppi	6	2	[7]
2	(Czech Republic) M Damm (India) L Paes	4	6	[10]

Quarterfinals
1	(Sweden) S Aspelin (Austria) J Knowle	2	6^{6}
(Argentina) JI Chela (Chile) F González	6	7^{8}
3	(Israel) J Erlich (Israel) A Ram	6^{4}	6	[7]
(Germany) T Behrend (Germany) C Kas	7^{7}	1	[10]
(Austria) J Melzer (Austria) A Peya	6^{4}	7	[7]
4	(Poland) M Fyrstenberg (Poland) M Matkowski	7^{7}	5	[10]
(United States) M Fish (United States) R Ginepri	4	3
2	(Czech Republic) M Damm (India) L Paes	6	6

Semifinals
(Argentina) JI Chela (Chile) F González	6	6^{7}	[8]
(Germany) T Behrend (Germany) C Kas	4	7^{9}	[10]
4	(Poland) M Fyrstenberg (Poland) M Matkowski	2	7	[12]
2	(Czech Republic) M Damm (India) L Paes	6	5	[10]

Final
(Germany) T Behrend (Germany) C Kas	4	2
4	(Poland) M Fyrstenberg (Poland) M Matkowski	6	6
