= 2008 Bank Austria-TennisTrophy – Doubles =

Doubles
- 2008 Bank Austria-TennisTrophy

Final
- Champions: (Belarus) Max Mirnyi (Israel) Andy Ram
- Runners-up: (Germany) Philipp Petzschner (Austria) Alexander Peya
- Score: 6–1, 7–5

Details
- Draw: 16
- Seeds: 4

Events
Singles	Doubles
- Vienna Open

Mariusz Fyrstenberg and Marcin Matkowski were the defending champions, but lost in the first round to Feliciano López and Fernando Verdasco.

Max Mirnyi and Andy Ram won in the final 6–1, 7–5, against Philipp Petzschner and Alexander Peya.

== Seeds ==
1. (Canada) Daniel Nestor / (Serbia) Nenad Zimonjić (quarterfinals)
2. (India) Mahesh Bhupathi / (The Bahamas) Mark Knowles (semifinals)
3. (Poland) Mariusz Fyrstenberg / (Poland) Marcin Matkowski (first round)
4. (Belarus) Max Mirnyi / (Israel) Andy Ram (champions)

== Draw ==
Key

- Q = Qualifier
- WC = Wild card
- LL = Lucky loser
- Alt = Alternate
- ITF = ITF entry
- PR = Protected ranking
- SR = Special ranking
- SE = Special exempt
- JE = Junior exempt
- JR = Junior Accelerator Programme entrant
- CO = College Accelerator Programme entrant
- NG = Next Gen Accelerator Program entrant
- w/o = Walkover
- r = Retired
- d = Defaulted

=== Draw ===
First round
1	(Canada) D Nestor (Serbia) N Zimonjić	6	6
(South Africa) R de Voest (Slovakia) F Polášek	4	4
(Argentina) A Calleri (Argentina) G Cañas	3	4
(Germany) P Petzschner (Austria) A Peya	6	6
3	(Poland) M Fyrstenberg (Poland) M Matkowski	3	2
(Spain) F López (Spain) F Verdasco	6	6
(Austria) J Melzer (Spain) T Robredo	6	6
(Germany) C Kas (Germany) P Kohlschreiber	4	4
(Chile) F González (Argentina) E Schwank	1	4
(Italy) S Bolelli (Italy) A Seppi	6	6
WC	(Austria) S Koubek (Austria) N Moser	2	1
4	(Belarus) M Mirnyi (Israel) A Ram	6	6
WC	(Austria) M Fischer (Austria) P Oswald	2	2
(Czech Republic) M Damm (Czech Republic) P Vízner	6	6
ALT	(Australia) A Fisher (United States) T Parrott	1	2
2	(India) M Bhupathi (The Bahamas) M Knowles	6	6

Quarterfinals
1	(Canada) D Nestor (Serbia) N Zimonjić	4	6	[6]
(Germany) P Petzschner (Austria) A Peya	6	3	[10]
(Spain) F López (Spain) F Verdasco	w/o
(Austria) J Melzer (Spain) T Robredo
(Italy) S Bolelli (Italy) A Seppi	6	2	[4]
4	(Belarus) M Mirnyi (Israel) A Ram	4	6	[10]
(Czech Republic) M Damm (Czech Republic) P Vízner	6^{1}	6^{6}
2	(India) M Bhupathi (The Bahamas) M Knowles	7^{7}	7^{8}

Semifinals
(Germany) P Petzschner (Austria) A Peya	7^{7}	6^{5}	[10]
(Spain) F López (Spain) F Verdasco	6^{0}	7^{7}	[5]
4	(Belarus) M Mirnyi (Israel) A Ram	2	6	[10]
2	(India) M Bhupathi (The Bahamas) M Knowles	6	3	[8]

Final
(Germany) P Petzschner (Austria) A Peya	1	5
4	(Belarus) M Mirnyi (Israel) A Ram	6	7
