= 2008 Bank Austria-TennisTrophy – Singles =

Singles
- 2008 Bank Austria-TennisTrophy

Final
- Champion: (Germany) Philipp Petzschner
- Runner-up: (France) Gaël Monfils
- Score: 6–4, 6–4

Details
- Draw: 32
- Seeds: 8

Events
Singles	Doubles
- Vienna Open

Novak Djokovic was the defending champion, but chose not to participate that year.

Philipp Petzschner won in the final 6–4, 6–4, against Gaël Monfils.

== Seeds ==
1. (Switzerland) Stanislas Wawrinka (first round)
2. (Chile) Fernando González (quarterfinals)
3. (Argentina) Juan Martín del Potro (second round, withdrew due to a left toe injury)
4. (Croatia) Ivo Karlović (first round)
5. (Spain) Fernando Verdasco (quarterfinals)
6. (Spain) Tommy Robredo (withdrew due to a left hip injury)
7. (France) Gilles Simon (first round)
8. (France) Gaël Monfils (final)

== Draw ==
Key

- Q = Qualifier
- WC = Wild card
- LL = Lucky loser
- Alt = Alternate
- ITF = ITF entry
- PR = Protected ranking
- SR = Special ranking
- SE = Special exempt
- JE = Junior exempt
- JR = Junior Accelerator Programme entrant
- CO = College Accelerator Programme entrant
- NG = Next Gen Accelerator Program entrant
- w/o = Walkover
- r = Retired
- d = Defaulted

=== Finals ===
Semifinals
Q	(Germany) Philipp Petzschner	3	6	6
(Spain) Feliciano López	6	3	3
(Germany) Philipp Kohlschreiber	4	7	6^{2}
8	(France) Gaël Monfils	6	5	7^{7}

Final
Q	(Germany) Philipp Petzschner	6	6
8	(France) Gaël Monfils	4	4

=== Top half ===
First round
1	(Switzerland) S Wawrinka	7^{7}	2	6^{5}
Q	(Germany) P Petzschner	6^{5}	6	7^{7}
Q	(Czech Republic) J Hernych	4	6	7^{7}
(Croatia) R Karanušić	6	4	6^{5}
(Spain) C Moyá	7^{7}	7^{8}
WC	(Germany) M Berrer	6^{5}	6^{6}
(Argentina) E Schwank	4	7	7^{7}
7	(France) G Simon	6	5	6^{5}
4	(Croatia) I Karlović	4	6^{4}
(Spain) JC Ferrero	6	7^{7}
(Croatia) I Ljubičić	6^{3}	3
(Austria) J Melzer	7^{7}	6
(Spain) F López	7^{7}	7^{7}
(Argentina) A Calleri	6^{2}	6^{4}
WC	(Austria) S Koubek	1	2
LL	(Colombia) S Giraldo	6	6

Second round
Q	(Germany) P Petzschner	6	6
Q	(Czech Republic) J Hernych	3	4
(Spain) C Moyá	6	6
(Argentina) E Schwank	2	3
(Spain) JC Ferrero	6^{4}	3
(Austria) J Melzer	7^{7}	6
(Spain) F López	7^{7}	6
LL	(Colombia) S Giraldo	6^{5}	3

Quarterfinals
Q	(Germany) P Petzschner	6	6
(Spain) C Moyá	4	2
(Austria) J Melzer	6	3	4
(Spain) F López	4	6	6

Semifinals
Q	(Germany) P Petzschner	3	6	6
(Spain) F López	6	3	3

=== Bottom half ===
First round
5	(Spain) F Verdasco	6	6
Q	(Romania) V Crivoi	4	4
(Argentina) G Cañas	7^{7}	6
(Italy) A Seppi	6^{2}	3
(Germany) P Kohlschreiber	6	6
(France) M Gicquel	2	2
WC	(Austria) M Fischer	6^{7}	6^{5}
3	(Argentina) JM del Potro	7^{9}	7^{7}
8	(France) G Monfils	3	6	6
WC	(Austria) A Peya	6	1	3
Q	(Czech Republic) P Snobel	4	2
(Czech Republic) R Štěpánek	6	6
(Latvia) E Gulbis	6	6
(Italy) F Volandri	2	3
(Italy) S Bolelli	6	6^{2}	2
2	(Chile) F González	4	7^{7}	6

Second round
5	(Spain) F Verdasco	6	6
(Argentina) G Cañas	1	2
(Germany) P Kohlschreiber	w/o
3	(Argentina) JM del Potro
8	(France) G Monfils	6	6
(Czech Republic) R Štěpánek	4	3
(Latvia) E Gulbis	6	6^{11}	1
2	(Chile) F González	4	7^{13}	6

Quarterfinals
5	(Spain) F Verdasco	2	3
(Germany) P Kohlschreiber	6	6
8	(France) G Monfils	6	7^{7}
2	(Chile) F González	3	6^{2}

Semifinals
(Germany) P Kohlschreiber	4	7	6^{2}
8	(France) G Monfils	6	5	7^{7}
