= Philipp Petzschner =

German tennis player (born 1984)

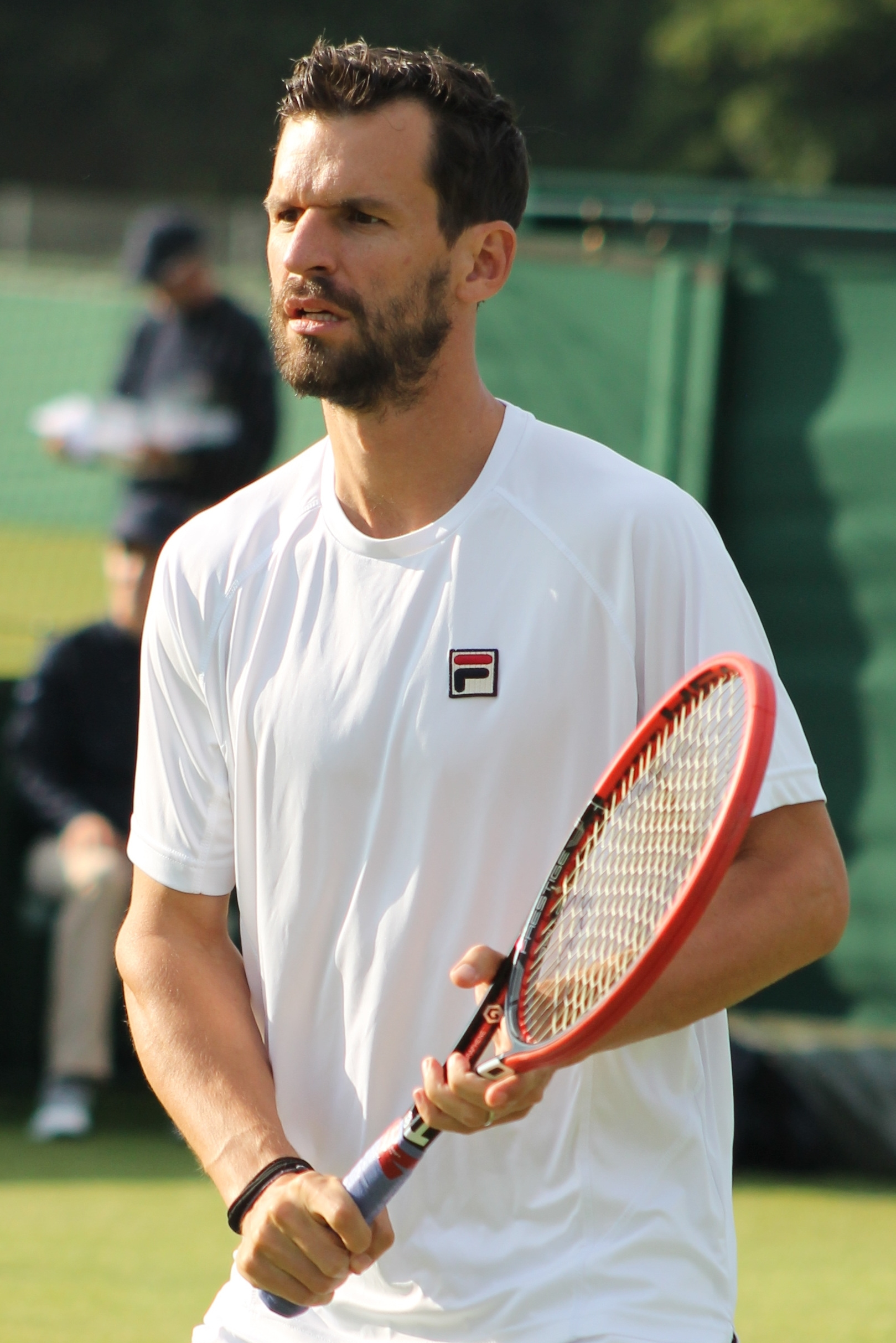
- Petzschner at Wimbledon in 2015
- Country (sports): Germany
- Residence: Pulheim, Germany
- Born: 24 March 1984 (age 42) Bayreuth, West Germany
- Height: 1.85 m (6 ft 1 in)
- Turned pro: 2001
- Retired: 2018
- Plays: Right-handed (two-handed backhand)
- Prize money: US$4,024,417

Singles
- Career record: 88–107
- Career titles: 1
- Highest ranking: No. 35 (14 September 2009)

Grand Slam singles results
- Australian Open: 2R (2012)
- French Open: 2R (2009, 2011)
- Wimbledon: 3R (2009, 2010)
- US Open: 2R (2007, 2009, 2010, 2011, 2012)

Other tournaments
- Olympic Games: 2R (2012)

Doubles
- Career record: 177–173
- Career titles: 8
- Highest ranking: No. 9 (4 April 2011)

Grand Slam doubles results
- Australian Open: QF (2011)
- French Open: 3R (2012)
- Wimbledon: W (2010)
- US Open: W (2011)

Other doubles tournaments
- Tour Finals: RR (2010, 2011)
- Olympic Games: 1R (2012)

Grand Slam mixed doubles results
- Australian Open: 2R (2011)
- Wimbledon: 2R (2009, 2011, 2012, 2017)
- US Open: QF (2012)

Other mixed doubles tournaments
- Olympic Games: 1R (2012)

Team competitions
- Davis Cup: SF (2007)

Philipp Petzschner (born 24 March 1984) is a retired German professional tennis player. He was known for his hard-hitting forehand and backhand slices. He reached a career-high doubles ranking of world No. 9, which he achieved in April 2011.

== Career ==
=== Juniors ===
As a junior Petzschner reached as high as No. 8 in the world in 2002 (and No. 1 in doubles). He reached the semi-finals of the 2001 Jr Wimbledon tournament, and won the 2002 French Open Jr doubles event.

=== 2007 ===
In 2007 US Open qualifying, he defeated fellow German player Benjamin Becker in the first round, before losing to Tommy Haas in four sets.

=== 2008 ===
In 2008 he qualified for Wimbledon, where he fell to Croatian Mario Ančić in the second round.

In October, he captured his first ATP title in Vienna, after he won his qualifying round matches and defeating top seed Stanislas Wawrinka in the first round.

=== 2009 ===
At the 2009 Australian Open, he was defeated by Brian Dabul in the first round. At Roland Garros, Petzschner reached the second round after defeating Canadian Peter Polansky in five sets. There, he lost to Spaniard Fernando Verdasco in straight sets. At the 2009 Gerry Weber Open, he took revenge for that defeat. He won in three sets before losing to Olivier Rochus from Belgium in the second round. At Wimbledon, he beat Rajeev Ram in the first round, then Mischa Zverev in the second round, but lost to Lleyton Hewitt in the third round. He reached the last sixteen in Washington, D.C., and Montreal. Petzschner was defeated by Juan Carlos Ferrero in the second round of the 2009 US Open after leading two sets to love.

He was not able to defend his title in Vienna as he had to pull out due to an injury.

=== 2010 ===
He lost in the first round of the 2010 Australian Open when comfortably leading two sets to love against Florian Mayer. In February, he won his first doubles title with Jürgen Melzer at the 2010 PBZ Zagreb Indoors. At the same event, he reached the singles semifinal, where he lost to Michael Berrer. In late February, he reached his second semifinal of the season in Memphis, but he was defeated by American John Isner. At the Gerry Weber Open in Halle/Westfalen in June, Petzschner lost to world no. 2 Roger Federer in a tough semifinal encounter. At Wimbledon he competed as the 33rd seed and Petzschner was defeated after a comeback of eventual champion and world no. 1 Rafael Nadal in five sets after leading 2–1 in the third round. In the Wimbledon Championships Doubles, Petzschner won his first Grand Slam title with Jürgen Melzer. They were the first unseeded players to win this competition in five years. This also made Petzschner the first German man to win a Grand Slam tournament since Boris Becker won the Australian Open in 1996.

At the 2010 US Open Petzschner lost in straight sets to Novak Djokovic in the second round.

At the end of August, he qualified for the World Tour Doubles Finals in London with Jürgen Melzer. They were knocked out in the group stage of the competition, finishing third.

Petzschner finished the year as world no. 57 in singles and world no. 20 in doubles. He earned a career-high prize money of $702,058, with a match record of 21–19 in singles and 22–16 in doubles.

=== 2011 ===
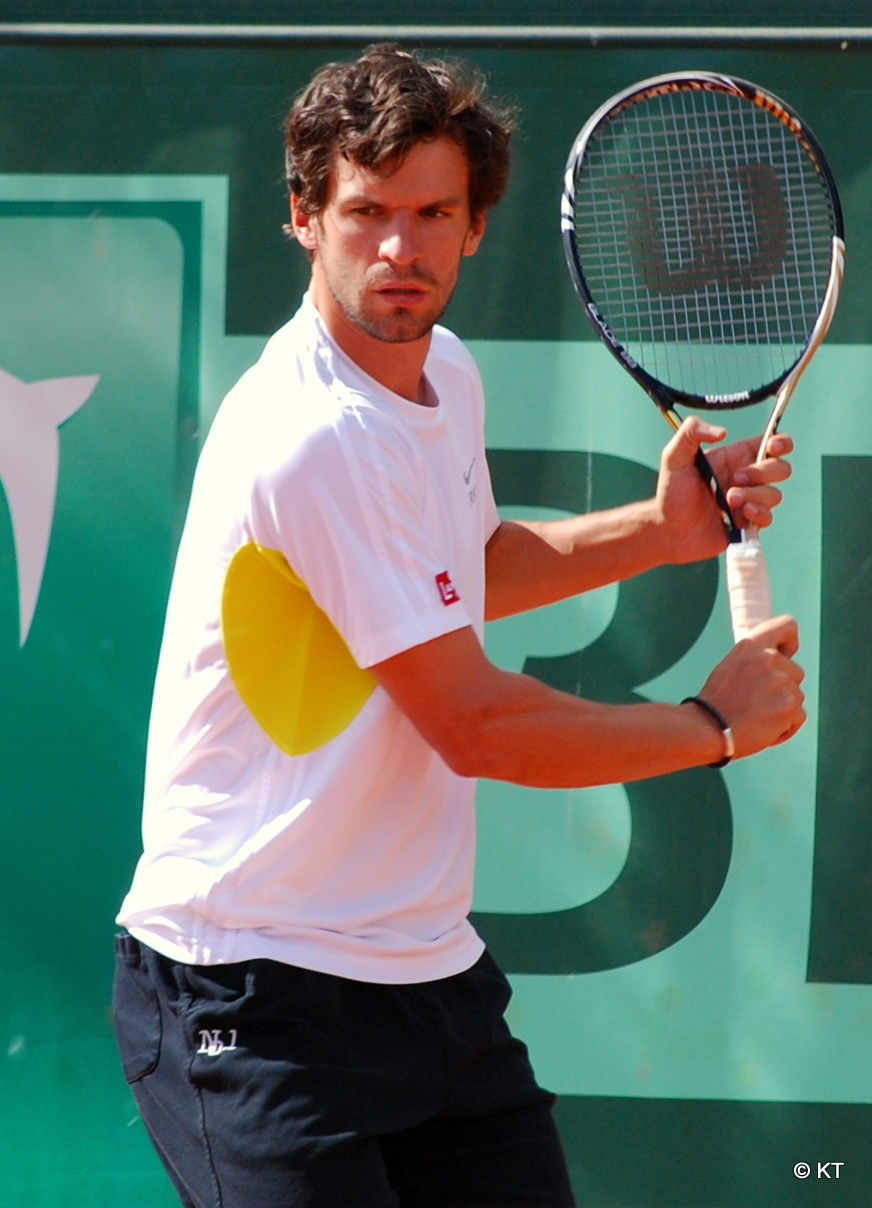
Petzschner in 2011

Petzschner and Melzer reached the doubles quarterfinal at the 2011 Australian Open, when they lost to Bob and Mike Bryan. In singles play, Petzschner was defeated in five sets by Jo-Wilfried Tsonga in the first round of the tournament. In Rotterdam, Petzschner won his third doubles title partnering Jürgen Melzer.

The height of Petzschner's season was reached when he and his partner Jürgen Melzer won the US Open Men's Doubles final, defeating the sixth seeded Polish team of Mariusz Fyrstenberg and Marcin Matkowski. A controversy occurred at 2–2 in the second set, when a ball bounced on Petzschner's left shin and the chair umpire ruled the play valid. When asked, Petzschner nodded ambiguously, even though the video replay later confirmed that the ball was returned illegally. Nevertheless, the incident did not affect the match's final result 6–2, 6–2.

Petzschner reached his first singles quarterfinal of the season in Dubai, defeating Andreas Seppi and Philipp Kohlschreiber, before falling to Tomáš Berdych. He represented Germany in the Davis Cup first-round tie against Croatia in Zagreb. Partnering Christopher Kas, he defeated Ivo Karlović and Ivan Dodig in five sets to give Germany a 2–1 lead. In the deciding fifth rubber, Petzschner replaced Florian Mayer and secured Germany's quarterfinal spot with a three-set win against Karlović.

At the 2011 BMW Open in Munich, he reached his first singles semifinal of the season. He defeated Ivan Dodig, Mikhail Youzhny, and Potito Starace, before losing to Florian Mayer. At the World Team Cup in Düsseldorf, Petzschner won the deciding doubles match partnering Philipp Kohlschreiber in the final against Argentina. In singles, he gave Germany a 1–0 lead against Russia, defeating Igor Andreev in straight sets.

Petzschner reached his second career singles final in Halle, on grass. He retired injured while trailing compatriot Kohlschreiber love-two in the second set.

=== 2012 ===
Petzschner reached the finals of the UNICEF Open, losing to David Ferrer in straight sets.

=== 2015 ===
Petzschner failed to qualify for any ATP singles events this year. However, in doubles he and partner Jonathan Erlich achieved success by reaching the Wimbledon semifinal as qualifiers. His year-end doubles ranking was no. 50.

=== 2016 ===
At the beginning of the year Petzschner and partner Alexander Peya got to three finals (Doha, Rotterdam and Acapulco), but lost them all.

In March he reached a quarterfinal of a Masters 1000 tournament for the first time in three and a half years at the Miami Open.

=== 2017 ===
Petzschner won the Swedish Open with partner Julian Knowle.

=== 2018 ===
Petzschner won the title at the Stuttgart Open, partnering Tim Pütz as a wild card entry. In October, he played his last professional match on the tour at the European Open in Antwerp.

== Playing style ==
Petzschner has a powerful serve (up to 230 km/h) and forehand. His slice backhand is very flat and dangerous, which he utilises so much to the extent that he comparably rarely hits a topspin or flat two-handed backhand. He is also an excellent player at the net, which makes him a better doubles player.

== Personal life ==
He married singer Dewi Sulaeman of the pop group Bellini in September 2010. They have one son and 2 daughters.

== Performance timelines ==
Key
W	F	SF	QF	#R	RR	Q#	P#	DNQ	A	Z#	PO	G	S	B	NMS	NTI	P	NH

(W) winner; (F) finalist; (SF) semifinalist; (QF) quarterfinalist; (#R) rounds 4, 3, 2, 1; (RR) round-robin stage; (Q#) qualification round; (P#) preliminary round; (DNQ) did not qualify; (A) absent; (Z#) Davis/Fed Cup Zonal Group (with number indication) or (PO) play-off; (G) gold, (S) silver or (B) bronze Olympic/Paralympic medal; (NMS) not a Masters tournament; (NTI) not a Tier I tournament; (P) postponed; (NH) not held; (SR) strike rate (events won / competed); (W–L) win–loss record.

=== Singles ===
Tournament	2001	2002	2003	2004	2005	2006	2007	2008	2009	2010	2011	2012	2013	2014	2015	SR	W–L	Win%
Grand Slam tournaments
Australian Open	A	A	A	A	A	A	Q2	Q1	1R	1R	1R	2R	A	A	Q2	0 / 4	1–4	20%
French Open	A	A	A	A	A	A	A	A	2R	1R	2R	1R	1R	A	A	0 / 5	2–5	29%
Wimbledon	A	A	A	A	A	A	A	2R	3R	3R	1R	2R	1R	A	A	0 / 6	6–6	50%
US Open	A	A	A	A	A	A	2R	Q3	2R	2R	2R	2R	1R	Q2	A	0 / 6	5–6	45%
Win–loss	0–0	0–0	0–0	0–0	0–0	0–0	1–1	1–1	4–4	3–4	2–4	3–4	0–3	0–0	0–0	0 / 21	14–21	40%
ATP World Tour Masters 1000
Indian Wells Masters	A	A	A	A	A	A	A	A	A	2R	2R	A	2R	A	Q2	0 / 3	3–3	50%
Miami Open	A	A	A	A	A	A	A	Q1	A	3R	3R	A	Q1	A	A	0 / 2	4–2	67%
Monte-Carlo Masters	A	A	A	A	A	A	A	A	A	3R	Q1	A	Q2	A	A	0 / 1	2–1	67%
Madrid Open	NH	A	A	A	A	A	A	A	A	2R	A	Q1	A	A	A	0 / 1	1–1	50%
Italian Open	A	A	A	A	A	A	A	A	A	A	A	Q1	A	A	A	0 / 0	0–0	–
Canadian Open	A	A	A	A	A	A	A	A	3R	1R	2R	A	A	A	A	0 / 3	3–3	50%
Cincinnati Masters	A	A	A	A	A	A	A	A	2R	1R	A	Q1	A	A	A	0 / 2	1–2	67%
Shanghai Masters	not held								1R	A	Q2	1R	A	A	A	0 / 2	0–2	0%
Paris Masters	A	A	A	A	A	A	A	A	1R	A	A	A	A	A	A	0 / 1	0–1	0%
German Open	A	Q1	A	A	1R	A	A	A	not Masters series							0 / 1	0–1	0%
Win–loss	0–0	0–0	0–0	0–0	0–1	0–0	0–0	0–0	3–4	6–6	4–3	0–1	1–1	0–0	0–0	0 / 16	14–16	47%
National representation
Summer Olympics	not held			A	not held			A	not held			2R	not held			0 / 1	1–1	50%
Davis Cup	A	A	A	A	A	A	SF	QF	A	A	QF	1R	A	A	PO	0 / 5	2–2	50%
Win–loss	0–0	0–0	0–0	0–0	0–0	0–0	0–1	0–0	0–0	0–0	2–0	1–2	0–0	0–0	0–0	0 / 6	3–3	50%
Career statistics
	2001	2002	2003	2004	2005	2006	2007	2008	2009	2010	2011	2012	2013	2014	2015	Career		
Tournaments	0	0	3	1	2	0	1	10	25	19	22	16	5	2	0	106		
Titles	0	0	0	0	0	0	0	1	0	0	0	0	0	0	0	1		
Finals	0	0	0	0	0	0	0	1	0	0	1	1	0	0	0	3		
Overall win–loss	0–0	0–0	2–3	1–1	0–2	0–0	1–2	10–9	15–25	21–19	24–22	10–17	3–5	1–2	0–0	88–107		
Year-end ranking	757	342	367	399	301	312	185	66	80	57	63	115	206	421	749	45.13%		

=== Doubles ===
Tournament	2001	2002	2003	2004	2005	2006	2007	2008	2009	2010	2011	2012	2013	2014	2015	2016	2017	2018	SR	W–L	Win%
Grand Slam tournaments
Australian Open	A	A	A	A	A	A	1R	A	2R	3R	QF	3R	A	A	A	1R	1R	A	0 / 7	8–7	53%
French Open	A	A	A	A	A	1R	A	A	1R	1R	1R	3R	1R	A	A	A	1R	1R	0 / 8	2–8	20%
Wimbledon	A	A	A	A	A	2R	A	QF	2R	W	QF	SF	A	A	SF	A	2R	3R	1 / 9	25–8	76%
US Open	A	A	A	A	A	2R	A	QF	1R	1R	W	2R	1R	A	1R	A	A	2R	1 / 9	12–8	60%
Win–loss	0–0	0–0	0–0	0–0	0–0	2–3	0–1	6–2	2–4	8–3	12–3	9–4	0–2	0–0	4–2	0–1	1–3	3–3	2 / 33	47–31	60%
Year-end championship
ATP Finals	did not qualify									RR	RR	did not qualify							0 / 2	2–4	33%
ATP World Tour Masters 1000
Indian Wells Masters	A	A	A	A	A	A	A	A	A	A	2R	A	1R	A	A	A	1R	1R	0 / 4	1–4	20%
Miami Open	A	A	A	A	A	A	A	A	A	1R	SF	A	1R	A	A	QF	QF	A	0 / 5	7–5	58%
Monte-Carlo Masters	A	A	A	A	A	A	A	A	A	A	2R	A	A	A	A	A	1R	A	0 / 2	0–2	0%
Madrid Open	NH	A	A	A	A	A	A	A	A	A	A	2R	A	A	A	A	A	A	0 / 1	0–1	0%
Italian Open	A	A	A	A	A	A	A	A	A	A	A	2R	A	A	A	A	A	A	0 / 1	1–1	50%
Canadian Open	A	A	A	A	A	A	A	A	QF	QF	1R	A	A	A	A	A	A	A	0 / 3	3–3	50%
Cincinnati Masters	A	A	A	A	A	A	A	A	A	2R	2R	1R	A	A	A	A	A	A	0 / 3	0–3	0%
Shanghai Masters	not held								2R	A	2R	QF	A	A	A	1R	A	A	0 / 4	2–4	33%
Paris Masters	A	A	A	A	A	A	A	A	A	A	A	A	A	A	A	A	A	A	0 / 0	0–0	–
German Open	A	1R	A	A	A	A	A	A	not Masters series										0 / 1	0–1	0%
Win–loss	0–0	0–1	0–0	0–0	0–0	0–0	0–0	0–0	2–2	1–3	4–6	3–4	0–2	0–0	0–0	2–2	2–3	0–1	0 / 24	14–24	37%
National representation
Summer Olympics	not held			A	not held			A	not held			1R	not held			A	not held		0 / 1	0–1	0%
Davis Cup	A	A	A	A	A	A	SF	QF	A	A	QF	1R	A	A	PO	1R	A	A	0 / 5	4–5	44%
Win–loss	0–0	0–0	0–0	0–0	0–0	0–0	1–0	1–1	0–0	0–0	1–1	0–3	0–0	0–0	1–0	0–1	0–0	0–0	0 / 6	4–6	40%
Career statistics
	2001	2002	2003	2004	2005	2006	2007	2008	2009	2010	2011	2012	2013	2014	2015	2016	2017	2018	Career		
Tournaments	1	2	0	0	0	11	2	10	22	17	25	20	8	2	11	12	17	14	174		
Titles	0	0	0	0	0	0	0	0	0	2	3	0	0	1	0	0	1	1	8		
Finals	0	0	0	0	0	0	0	1	0	3	3	1	0	1	0	3	2	1	15		
Overall win–loss	0–1	0–2	0–0	0–0	0–0	7–11	1–2	17–13	17–21	22–16	34–26	21–21	4–7	5–1	7–11	15–12	16–16	11–13	177–173		
Win %	0%	0%	–	–	–	39%	33%	57%	45%	58%	57%	50%	36%	83%	39%	56%	50%	46%	50.57%		
Year-end ranking	780	271	228	201	110	71	138	41	55	20	10	38	158	184	50	66	71	84			

== Grand Slam finals ==
=== Doubles: 2 (2 titles) ===
Result	Year	Tournament	Surface	Partner	Opponents	Score
Win	2010	Wimbledon	Grass	(Austria) Jürgen Melzer	(Sweden) Robert Lindstedt (Romania) Horia Tecău	6–1, 7–5, 7–5
Win	2011	US Open	Hard	(Austria) Jürgen Melzer	(Poland) Mariusz Fyrstenberg (Poland) Marcin Matkowski	6–2, 6–2

== ATP career finals ==
=== Singles: 3 (1 title, 2 runner-ups) ===
Legend Grand Slam tournaments (0–0) ATP World Tour Finals (0–0) ATP World Tour Masters 1000 (0–0) ATP International Series Gold / ATP World Tour 500 Series (1–0) ATP World Tour 250 Series (0–2)	Finals by surface Hard (1–0) Clay (0–0) Grass (0–2)	Finals by setting Outdoor (0–2) Indoor (1–0)

Result	W–L	Date	Tournament	Tier	Surface	Opponent	Score
Win	1–0	Oct 2008	Vienna Open, Austria	Intl. Gold	Hard (i)	(France) Gaël Monfils	6–4, 6–4
Loss	1–1	Jun 2011	Halle Open, Germany	250 Series	Grass	(Germany) Philipp Kohlschreiber	6–7^{(5–7)}, 0–2 ret.
Loss	1–2	Jun 2012	Rosmalen Championships, Netherlands	250 Series	Grass	(Spain) David Ferrer	3–6, 4–6

=== Doubles: 15 (8 titles, 7 runner-ups) ===
Legend Grand Slam tournaments (2–0) ATP World Tour Finals (0–0) ATP World Tour Masters 1000 (0–0) ATP International Series Gold / ATP World Tour 500 Series (1–4) ATP World Tour 250 Series (5–3)	Finals by surface Hard (4–5) Clay (2–2) Grass (2–0)	Finals by setting Outdoor (5–5) Indoor (3–2)

Result	W–L	Date	Tournament	Tier	Surface	Partner	Opponents	Score
Loss	0–1	Oct 2008	Vienna Open, Austria	Intl. Gold	Hard (i)	(Austria) Alexander Peya	(Belarus) Max Mirnyi (Israel) Andy Ram	1–6, 5–7
Win	1–1	Feb 2010	Zagreb Indoors, Croatia	250 Series	Hard (i)	(Austria) Jürgen Melzer	(France) Arnaud Clément (Belgium) Olivier Rochus	3–6, 6–3, [10–8]
Win	2–1	Jul 2010	Wimbledon, United Kingdom	Grand Slam	Grass	(Austria) Jürgen Melzer	(Sweden) Robert Lindstedt (Romania) Horia Tecău	6–1, 7–5, 7–5
Loss	2–2	Jul 2010	Stuttgart Open, Germany	250 Series	Clay	(Germany) Christopher Kas	(Argentina) Carlos Berlocq (Argentina) Eduardo Schwank	6–7^{(5–7)}, 6–7^{(6–8)}
Win	3–2	Feb 2011	Rotterdam Open, Netherlands	500 Series	Hard (i)	(Austria) Jürgen Melzer	(France) Michaël Llodra (Serbia) Nenad Zimonjić	6–4, 3–6, [10–5]
Win	4–2	Jul 2011	Stuttgart Open, Germany	250 Series	Clay	(Austria) Jürgen Melzer	(Spain) Marcel Granollers (Spain) Marc López	6–3, 6–4
Win	5–2	Sep 2011	US Open, United States	Grand Slam	Hard	(Austria) Jürgen Melzer	(Poland) Mariusz Fyrstenberg (Poland) Marcin Matkowski	6–2, 6–2
Loss	5–3	Jan 2012	Brisbane International, Australia	250 Series	Hard	(Austria) Jürgen Melzer	(Belarus) Max Mirnyi (Canada) Daniel Nestor	1–6, 2–6
Win	6–3	Oct 2014	Vienna Open, Austria	250 Series	Hard (i)	(Austria) Jürgen Melzer	(Germany) Andre Begemann (Austria) Julian Knowle	7–6^{(8–6)}, 4–6, [10–7]
Loss	6–4	Jan 2016	Qatar Open, Qatar	250 Series	Hard	(Austria) Alexander Peya	(Spain) Feliciano López (Spain) Marc López	4–6, 3–6
Loss	6–5	Feb 2016	Rotterdam Open, Netherlands	500 Series	Hard (i)	(Austria) Alexander Peya	(France) Nicolas Mahut (Canada) Vasek Pospisil	6–7^{(2–7)}, 4–6
Loss	6–6	Feb 2016	Mexican Open, Mexico	500 Series	Hard	(Austria) Alexander Peya	(Philippines) Treat Huey (Belarus) Max Mirnyi	6–7^{(5–7)}, 3–6
Loss	6–7	Apr 2017	Barcelona Open, Spain	500 Series	Clay	(Austria) Alexander Peya	(Romania) Florin Mergea (Pakistan) Aisam-ul-Haq Qureshi	4–6, 3–6
Win	7–7	Jul 2017	Swedish Open, Sweden	250 Series	Clay	(Austria) Julian Knowle	(Netherlands) Sander Arends (Netherlands) Matwé Middelkoop	6–2, 3–6, [10–7]
Win	8–7	Jun 2018	Stuttgart Open, Germany (2)	250 Series	Grass	(Germany) Tim Pütz	(Sweden) Robert Lindstedt (Poland) Marcin Matkowski	7–6^{(7–5)}, 6–3

=== Team competition: 1 (1 title) ===
Result	W–L	Year	Tournament	Surface	Partners	Opponents	Score
Win	1–0	2011	World Team Cup, Germany	Clay	(Germany) Florian Mayer (Germany) Philipp Kohlschreiber (Germany) Christopher Kas	(Argentina) Juan Mónaco (Argentina) Juan Ignacio Chela (Argentina) Máximo González	2–1

== ATP Challenger Tour finals ==
=== Singles: 5 (1–4) ===
Result	W–L	Date	Tournament	Surface	Opponent	Score
Loss	0–1	Nov 2006	Eckental, Germany	Carpet (i)	(Latvia) Ernests Gulbis	3–6, 0–6
Loss	0–2	Jul 2007	Oberstaufen, Germany	Clay	(Spain) Gabriel Trujillo Soler	4–6, 4–6
Win	1–2	Oct 2007	Rennes, France	Hard (i)	(Luxembourg) Gilles Müller	6–3, 6–4
Loss	1–3	Jan 2008	Heilbronn, Germany	Carpet (i)	(Kazakhstan) Andrey Golubev	6–2, 1–6, 1–3 ret.
Loss	1–4	Feb 2008	Belgrade, Serbia	Carpet (i)	(Croatia) Roko Karanušić	7–5, 1–6, 6–7^{(5–7)}

=== Doubles: 39 (21–18) ===
Result	W–L	Date	Tournament	Surface	Partner	Opponents	Score
Loss	0–1	Nov 2002	Eckental, Germany	Carpet (i)	(Germany) Simon Stadler	(Switzerland) Yves Allegro (Croatia) Lovro Zovko	6–4, 6–7^{(0–7)}, 4–6
Loss	0–2	Aug 2003	Geneva, Switzerland	Clay	(Spain) Emilio Benfele Álvarez	(Spain) Álex López Morón (Argentina) Andrés Schneiter	4–6, 7–5, 6–7^{(7–9)}
Loss	0–3	Sep 2003	Aschaffenburg, Germany	Clay	(Norway) Jan Frode Andersen	(Germany) Karsten Braasch (Germany) Franz Stauder	4–6, 5–7
Win	1–3	Aug 2004	Mönchengladbach, Germany	Clay	(Germany) Christopher Kas	(Germany) Karsten Braasch (Germany) Franz Stauder	3–6, 6–2, 7–6^{(7–4)}
Win	2–3	Nov 2004	Eckental, Germany	Carpet (i)	(Germany) Christopher Kas	(Italy) Daniele Bracciali (Czech Republic) Petr Luxa	6–4, 7–6^{(7–5)}
Win	3–3	Feb 2005	Wolfsburg, Germany	Carpet (i)	(Austria) Alexander Peya	(Pakistan) Aisam-ul-Haq Qureshi (Croatia) Lovro Zovko	6–2, 6–4
Loss	3–4	Feb 2005	Lübeck, Germany	Carpet (i)	(Germany) Lars Uebel	(Czech Republic) Pavel Šnobel (Czech Republic) Martin Štěpánek	6–7^{(5–7)}, 7–5, 5–7
Win	4–4	May 2005	Dresden, Germany	Clay	(Germany) Christopher Kas	(Netherlands) Bart Beks (Netherlands) Martijn van Haasteren	6–7^{(2–7)}, 6–2, 6–4
Loss	4–5	Jul 2005	Rimini, Italy	Clay	(Germany) Christopher Kas	(Czech Republic) David Škoch (Czech Republic) Martin Štěpánek	3–6, 7–6^{(7–1)}, 1–6
Loss	4–6	Sep 2005	Budapest, Hungary	Clay	(Germany) Lars Uebel	(Italy) Leonardo Azzaro (Argentina) Sergio Roitman	3–6, 7–5, 3–6
Win	5–6	Oct 2005	Mons, Belgium	Carpet (i)	(Germany) Christopher Kas	(Czech Republic) Tomáš Cibulec (Belgium) Tom Vanhoudt	7–6^{(7–4)}, 6–2
Win	6–6	Nov 2005	Eckental, Germany (2)	Carpet (i)	(Germany) Christopher Kas	(Germany) Torsten Popp (Netherlands) Jasper Smit	6–3, 7–5
Loss	6–7	Nov 2005	Helsinki, Finland	Hard (i)	(Germany) Christopher Kas	(Switzerland) Yves Allegro (Germany) Michael Kohlmann	6–4, 1–6, 4–6
Loss	6–8	Nov 2005	Sunderland, United Kingdom	Hard (i)	(Germany) Christopher Kas	(Germany) Frank Moser (Germany) Sebastian Rieschick	4–6, 7–6^{(7–3)}, 4–6
Win	7–8	Jan 2006	Heilbronn, Germany	Carpet (i)	(Germany) Christopher Kas	(Czech Republic) Lukáš Dlouhý (Czech Republic) David Škoch	6–7^{(2–7)}, 6–3, [10–4]
Loss	7–9	Feb 2006	Bergamo, Italy	Carpet (i)	(Germany) Christopher Kas	(Italy) Daniele Bracciali (Italy) Giorgio Galimberti	5–7, 6–0, [11–13]
Win	8–9	Feb 2006	Besançon, France	Hard (i)	(Germany) Christopher Kas	(Switzerland) Jean-Claude Scherrer (Croatia) Lovro Zovko	6–2, 6–2
Win	9–9	Apr 2006	Cardiff, United Kingdom	Hard (i)	(Austria) Alexander Peya	(Sweden) Filip Prpic (Sweden) Björn Rehnquist	4–6, 6–3, [10–7]
Loss	9–10	May 2006	Dresden, Germany	Clay	(Germany) Christopher Kas	(Switzerland) Yves Allegro (Slovakia) Michal Mertiňák	3–6, 0–6
Win	10–10	Sep 2007	Donetsk, Ukraine	Hard	(Germany) Simon Stadler	(United States) Patrick Briaud (United States) Nicholas Monroe	3–6, 7–5, [10–6]
Loss	10–11	Oct 2007	Mons, Belgium	Hard (i)	(Austria) Alexander Peya	(Poland) Tomasz Bednarek (Slovakia) Filip Polášek	2–6, 7–5, [8–10]
Win	11–11	Oct 2007	Rennes, France	Hard (i)	(Germany) Björn Phau	(Slovakia) Filip Polášek (Slovakia) Igor Zelenay	6–2, 6–2
Loss	11–12	Oct 2007	Kolding, Denmark	Hard (i)	(Austria) Alexander Peya	(Denmark) Frederik Nielsen (Denmark) Rasmus Nørby	6–4, 3–6, [8–10]
Win	12–12	Nov 2007	Aachen, Germany	Carpet (i)	(Austria) Alexander Peya	(Germany) Dominik Meffert (Germany) Mischa Zverev	6–3, 6–2
Win	13–12	Nov 2007	Eckental, Germany (3)	Carpet (i)	(Austria) Alexander Peya	(Germany) Philipp Marx (Germany) Lars Uebel	6–3, 6–4
Win	14–12	Feb 2008	Besançon, France (2)	Hard (i)	(Austria) Alexander Peya	(Switzerland) Yves Allegro (Romania) Horia Tecău	6–3, 6–1
Loss	14–13	Nov 2008	Bratislava, Slovakia	Hard (i)	(Austria) Alexander Peya	(Czech Republic) František Čermák (Poland) Łukasz Kubot	4–6, 4–6
Loss	14–14	Feb 2009	Heilbronn, Germany	Carpet (i)	(Germany) Benedikt Dorsch	(Slovakia) Karol Beck (Czech Republic) Jaroslav Levinský	3–6, 2–6
Win	15–14	May 2009	Tenerife, Spain	Hard (i)	(Austria) Alexander Peya	(United Kingdom) James Auckland (United Kingdom) Josh Goodall	6–2, 3–6, [10–4]
Loss	15–15	Nov 2011	Ortisei, Italy	Carpet (i)	(Germany) Alexander Waske	(Germany) Dustin Brown (Croatia) Lovro Zovko	4–6, 6–7^{(4–7)}
Win	16–15	Mar 2013	Irving, United States	Hard	(Austria) Jürgen Melzer	(United States) Eric Butorac (United Kingdom) Dominic Inglot	6–3, 6–1
Loss	16–16	Nov 2014	Eckental, Germany	Carpet (i)	(Germany) Andreas Beck	(Belgium) Ruben Bemelmans (Belgium) Niels Desein	3–6, 6–4, [8–10]
Loss	16–17	Nov 2014	Helsinki, Finland	Hard (i)	(United Kingdom) Jonathan Marray	(Finland) Henri Kontinen (Finland) Jarkko Nieminen	6–7^{(2–7)}, 4–6
Win	17–17	Feb 2015	Wrocław, Poland	Hard (i)	(Germany) Tim Pütz	(Canada) Frank Dancevic (Poland) Andriej Kapaś	7–6^{(7–4)}, 6–3
Loss	17–18	Mar 2015	Irving, United States	Hard	(Germany) Benjamin Becker	(Sweden) Robert Lindstedt (Ukraine) Sergiy Stakhovsky	4–6, 4–6
Win	18–18	Oct 2015	Mons, Belgium (2)	Hard (i)	(Belgium) Ruben Bemelmans	(Australia) Rameez Junaid (Slovakia) Igor Zelenay	6–3, 6–1
Win	19–18	Nov 2015	Eckental, Germany (4)	Carpet (i)	(Belgium) Ruben Bemelmans	(United Kingdom) Ken Skupski (United Kingdom) Neal Skupski	7–5, 6–2
Win	20–18	Mar 2018	Irving, United States (2)	Hard	(Austria) Alexander Peya	(Moldova) Radu Albot (Australia) Matthew Ebden	6–2, 6–4
Win	21–18	May 2018	Aix-en-Provence, France	Clay	(Germany) Tim Pütz	(Argentina) Guido Andreozzi (France) Kenny de Schepper	6–7^{(3–7)}, 6–2, [10–8]

== Junior Grand Slam finals ==
=== Doubles: 2 (1 title, 1 runner-up) ===
Result	Year	Tournament	Surface	Partner	Opponents	Score
Loss	2001	French Open	Clay	(Germany) Markus Bayer	(Colombia) Alejandro Falla (Colombia) Carlos Salamanca	6–3, 5–7, 4–6
Win	2002	French Open	Clay	(Germany) Markus Bayer	(Australia) Ryan Henry (Australia) Todd Reid	7–5, 6–4

== Wins over top 10 players ==
#	Player	Rank	Event	Surface	Rd	Score	PP Rank
2008
1.	(Switzerland) Stan Wawrinka	10	Vienna, Austria	Hard (i)	1R	6–7^{(5–7)}, 6–2, 7–6^{(7–5)}	125
2009
2.	(Spain) Fernando Verdasco	8	Halle, Germany	Grass	1R	3–6, 7–6^{(7–5)}, 6–4	59
2011
3.	(Austria) Jürgen Melzer	10	Miami, United States	Hard	2R	6–3, 6–4	66
4.	(Czech Republic) Tomáš Berdych	7	Halle, Germany	Grass	SF	7–6^{(9–7)}, 2–6, 6–3	71

== Records ==
• ‘’’Record of consecutive five-set Grand Slam matches’’’

Record	Time span	Matches	Players matched
7 consecutive matches	2009–2010	vs. (Ukraine) Sergiy Stakhovsky 7–6^{(7–3)}, 6–7^{(6–8)}, 6–4, 4–6, 6–3 ‘’’W’’’ 2009 US Open 1R vs. (Spain) Juan Carlos Ferrero 6–1, 6–3, 4–6, 2–6, 4–6 ‘’’L’’’ 2009 US Open 2R vs. (Germany) Florian Mayer 6–0, 6–2, 4–6, 2–6, 2–6 ‘’’L’’’ 2010 Australian Open 1R vs. (Australia) Carsten Ball 6–3, 7–6^{(7–4)}, 2–6, 5–7, 7–9 ‘’’L’’’ 2010 Roland Garros 1R vs. (France) Stéphane Robert 6–4, 7–6^{(8–6)}, 4–6, 2–6, 6–4 ‘’’W’’’ 2010 Wimbledon 1R vs. (Poland) Łukasz Kubot 6–4, 3–6, 4–6, 6–3, 6–2 ‘’’W’’’ 2010 Wimbledon 2R vs. (Spain) Rafael Nadal 4–6, 6–4, 7–6^{(7–5)}, 2–6, 3–6 ‘’’L’’’ 2010 Wimbledon 3R	(Serbia) Viktor Troicki
