= Vienna Open =

Erste Bank Open

ATP Tour
- Founded: 1974; 52 years ago
- Location: Vienna; Austria
- Venue: Wiener Stadthalle
- Category: ATP Tour 500 / ATP International Series Gold / ATP Championship Series (1996–2008, 2015-current); ATP Tour 250 / ATP World Series (1990–1995, 2009–2014)
- Surface: Carpet – indoors (1976–1999); Hard (indoor) (1974, 2000–current)
- Draw: 32S / 16Q / 16D
- Prize money: €2,797,985 (2026)
- Website: erstebank-open.com

Current champions (2026)
- Singles: (Spain) Carlos Alcaraz
- Doubles: (Austria) Neil Oberleitner (Austria) Lucas Miedler

The Erste Bank Open or Vienna Open is an annual professional tennis ATP 500 tournament on the ATP Tour. The event was renamed after its sponsor Erste Bank in 2011. It is held at the Wiener Stadthalle, in Vienna, Austria on indoor hardcourts.

Originally an event of the Grand Prix tennis circuit (1974–1989), it was also known as the Stadthalle Open, and as the Fischer-Grand Prix from 1976 to 1985. Subsequently it was named the CA-TennisTrophy from 1986 to 2003, as the BA-CA-TennisTrophy from 2004 to 2007 and as the Bank Austria TennisTrophy from 2008 to 2010.

Austria's most successful tennis player, Thomas Muster, never won the Vienna Open, but was a runner-up on three occasions (1988, 1993, 1995), and a semi-finalist on another four occasions (1987, 1989, 1990, 1994). Three Austrian players have won the singles title at the Vienna Open: Horst Skoff in 1988, Jürgen Melzer in both 2009 and 2010, and Dominic Thiem in 2019.

== Past finals ==
=== Singles ===
Year	Champions	Runners-up	Score
↓ Grand Prix circuit ↓
1974	(United States) Vitas Gerulaitis	(Rhodesia) Andrew Pattison	6–4, 3–6, 6–3, 6–2
1975	Not held		
1976	(Poland) Wojciech Fibak	(Mexico) Raúl Ramírez	6–7, 6–3, 6–4, 2–6, 6–1
1977	(United States) Brian Gottfried	(Poland) Wojciech Fibak	6–1, 6–1
1978	(United States) Stan Smith	(Hungary) Balázs Taróczy	4–6, 7–6, 7–6, 6–3
1979	(United States) Stan Smith (2)	(Poland) Wojciech Fibak	6–4, 6–0, 6–2
1980	(United States) Brian Gottfried (2)	(United States) Trey Waltke	6–2, 6–4, 6–3
1981	(Czechoslovakia) Ivan Lendl	(United States) Brian Gottfried	1–6, 6–0, 6–1, 6–2
1982	(United States) Brian Gottfried (3)	(United States) Bill Scanlon	6–1, 6–4, 6–0
1983	(United States) Brian Gottfried (4)	(United States) Mel Purcell	6–2, 6–3, 7–5
1984	(United States) Tim Wilkison	(Czechoslovakia) Pavel Složil	6–1, 6–1, 6–2
1985	(Sweden) Jan Gunnarsson	(Belgium) Libor Pimek	6–7, 6–2, 6–4, 1–6, 7–5
1986	(United States) Brad Gilbert	(Czechoslovakia) Karel Nováček	3–6, 6–3, 7–5, 6–0
1987	(Sweden) Jonas Svensson	(Israel) Amos Mansdorf	1–6, 1–6, 6–2, 6–3, 7–5
1988	(Austria) Horst Skoff	(Austria) Thomas Muster	4–6, 6–3, 6–4, 6–2
1989	(United States) Paul Annacone	(New Zealand) Kelly Evernden	6–7, 6–4, 6–1, 2–6, 6–3
↓ ATP Tour 250 (Note: Known as World Series from 1990 till 1999.) ↓
1990	(Sweden) Anders Järryd	(Austria) Horst Skoff	6–3, 6–3, 6–1
1991	(Germany) Michael Stich	(Netherlands) Jan Siemerink	6–4, 6–4, 6–4
1992	(Czechoslovakia) Petr Korda	(Italy) Gianluca Pozzi	6–3, 6–2, 5–7, 6–1
1993	(Croatia) Goran Ivanišević	(Austria) Thomas Muster	4–6, 6–4, 6–4, 7–6^{(7–3)}
1994	(United States) Andre Agassi	(Germany) Michael Stich	7–6^{(7–4)}, 4–6, 6–2, 6–3
1995	(Belgium) Filip Dewulf	(Austria) Thomas Muster	7–5, 6–2, 1–6, 7–5
↓ ATP Tour 500 (Note: Known as Championship Series from 1990 till 1999 and International Series Gold from 2000 till 2008.) ↓
1996	(Germany) Boris Becker	(Netherlands) Jan Siemerink	6–4, 6–7^{(7–9)}, 6–2, 6–3
1997	(Croatia) Goran Ivanišević (2)	(United Kingdom) Greg Rusedski	3–6, 6–7^{(4–7)}, 7–6^{(9–7)}, 6–2, 6–3
1998	(United States) Pete Sampras	(Slovakia) Karol Kučera	6–3, 7–6^{(7–3)}, 6–1
1999	(United Kingdom) Greg Rusedski	(Germany) Nicolas Kiefer	6–7^{(5–7)}, 2–6, 6–3, 7–5, 6–4
2000	(United Kingdom) Tim Henman	(Germany) Tommy Haas	6–4, 6–4, 6–4
2001	(Germany) Tommy Haas	(Argentina) Guillermo Cañas	6–2, 7–6^{(8–6)}, 6–4
2002	(Switzerland) Roger Federer	(Czech Republic) Jiří Novák	6–4, 6–1, 3–6, 6–4
2003	(Switzerland) Roger Federer (2)	(Spain) Carlos Moyá	6–3, 6–3, 6–3
2004	(Spain) Feliciano López	(Argentina) Guillermo Cañas	6–4, 1–6, 7–5, 3–6, 7–5
2005	(Croatia) Ivan Ljubičić	(Spain) Juan Carlos Ferrero	6–2, 6–4, 7–6^{(7–5)}
2006	(Croatia) Ivan Ljubičić (2)	(Chile) Fernando González	6–3, 6–4, 7–5
2007	(Serbia) Novak Djokovic	(Switzerland) Stan Wawrinka	6–4, 6–0
2008	(Germany) Philipp Petzschner	(France) Gaël Monfils	6–4, 6–4
↓ ATP Tour 250 ↓
2009	(Austria) Jürgen Melzer	(Croatia) Marin Čilić	6–4, 6–3
2010	(Austria) Jürgen Melzer (2)	(Austria) Andreas Haider-Maurer	6–7^{(10–12)}, 7–6^{(7–4)}, 6–4
2011	(France) Jo-Wilfried Tsonga	(Argentina) Juan Martín del Potro	6–7^{(5–7)}, 6–3, 6–4
2012	(Argentina) Juan Martín del Potro	(Slovenia) Grega Žemlja	7–5, 6–3
2013	(Germany) Tommy Haas (2)	(Netherlands) Robin Haase	6–3, 4–6, 6–4
2014	(United Kingdom) Andy Murray	(Spain) David Ferrer	5–7, 6–2, 7–5
↓ ATP Tour 500 ↓
2015	(Spain) David Ferrer	(United States) Steve Johnson	4–6, 6–4, 7–5
2016	(United Kingdom) Andy Murray (2)	(France) Jo-Wilfried Tsonga	6–3, 7–6^{(8–6)}
2017	(France) Lucas Pouille	(France) Jo-Wilfried Tsonga	6–1, 6–4
2018	(South Africa) Kevin Anderson	(Japan) Kei Nishikori	6–3, 7–6^{(7–3)}
2019	(Austria) Dominic Thiem	(Argentina) Diego Schwartzman	3–6, 6–4, 6–3
2020	(Russia) Andrey Rublev	(Italy) Lorenzo Sonego	6–4, 6–4
2021	(Germany) Alexander Zverev	(United States) Frances Tiafoe	7–5, 6–4
2022	Daniil Medvedev	(Canada) Denis Shapovalov	4–6, 6–3, 6–2
2023	(Italy) Jannik Sinner	Daniil Medvedev	7–6^{(9–7)}, 4–6, 6–3
2024	(United Kingdom) Jack Draper	Karen Khachanov	6–4, 7–5
2025	(Italy) Jannik Sinner (2)	(Germany) Alexander Zverev	3–6, 6–3, 7–5
2026	(Spain) Carlos Alcaraz	(Australia) Alex de Minaur	6–1, 6-4

=== Doubles ===
Year	Champions	Runners-up	Score
↓ Grand Prix circuit ↓
1974	(Rhodesia) Andrew Pattison (South Africa) Raymond Moore	(South Africa) Bob Hewitt (South Africa) Frew McMillan	6–4, 5–7, 6–4
1975	Not held		
1976	(South Africa) Bob Hewitt (South Africa) Frew McMillan	(United States) Brian Gottfried (Mexico) Raúl Ramírez	6–4, 4–0 ret.
1977	(South Africa) Bob Hewitt (2) (South Africa) Frew McMillan (2)	(Poland) Wojciech Fibak (Czechoslovakia) Jan Kodeš	6–4, 6–3
1978	(Paraguay) Víctor Pecci (Hungary) Balázs Taróczy	(South Africa) Bob Hewitt (South Africa) Frew McMillan	6–3, 6–7, 6–4
1979	(South Africa) Bob Hewitt (3) (South Africa) Frew McMillan (3)	(United States) Brian Gottfried (Mexico) Raúl Ramírez	6–4, 3–6, 6–1
1980	(United States) Stan Smith (United States) Robert Lutz	(Switzerland) Heinz Günthardt (Czechoslovakia) Pavel Složil	6–1, 6–2
1981	(United States) Steve Denton (United States) Tim Wilkison	(United States) Sammy Giammalva (United States) Fred McNair	4–6, 6–3, 6–4
1982	(France) Henri Leconte (Czechoslovakia) Pavel Složil	(United States) Mark Dickson (United States) Terry Moor	6–1, 7–6
1983	(United States) Stan Smith (2) (United States) Mel Purcell	(Brazil) Marcos Hocevar (Brazil) Cássio Motta	6–3, 6–4
1984	(Poland) Wojciech Fibak (United States) Sandy Mayer	(Switzerland) Heinz Günthardt (Hungary) Balázs Taróczy	6–4, 6–4
1985	(United States) Mike De Palmer (United States) Gary Donnelly	(Spain) Sergio Casal (Spain) Emilio Sánchez	6–4, 6–3
1986	(Brazil) Ricardo Acioly (Poland) Wojciech Fibak (2)	(United States) Brad Gilbert (Socialist Federal Republic of Yugoslavia) Slobodan Živojinović	walkover
1987	(United States) Mel Purcell (2) (United States) Tim Wilkison (2)	(Spain) Emilio Sánchez (Spain) Javier Sánchez	6–3, 7–5
1988	(Austria) Alex Antonitsch (Hungary) Balázs Taróczy (2)	(United States) Kevin Curren (Czechoslovakia) Tomáš Šmíd	4–6, 6–3, 7–6
1989	(Sweden) Jan Gunnarsson (Sweden) Anders Järryd	(United States) Paul Annacone (New Zealand) Kelly Evernden	6–2, 6–3
↓ ATP Tour 250 ↓
1990	(Germany) Udo Riglewski (Germany) Michael Stich	(Mexico) Jorge Lozano (United States) Todd Witsken	6–4, 6–4
1991	(South Africa) Gary Muller (Sweden) Anders Järryd (2)	(Switzerland) Jakob Hlasek (United States) Patrick McEnroe	6–4, 7–5
1992	(Sweden) Ronnie Båthman (Sweden) Anders Järryd (3)	(United States) Kent Kinnear (Germany) Udo Riglewski	6–3, 7–5
1993	(Zimbabwe) Byron Black (United States) Jonathan Stark	(United States) Mike Bauer (Germany) David Prinosil	6–3, 7–6
1994	(United States) Mike Bauer (Czech Republic) David Rikl	(Austria) Alex Antonitsch (United Kingdom) Greg Rusedski	7–6, 6–4
1995	(South Africa) Ellis Ferreira (Netherlands) Jan Siemerink	(Australia) Todd Woodbridge (Australia) Mark Woodforde	6–4, 7–5
↓ ATP Tour 500 ↓
1996	(Russia) Yevgeni Kafelnikov (Czech Republic) Daniel Vacek	(Czech Republic) Pavel Vízner (Netherlands) Menno Oosting	6–4, 7–5
1997	(South Africa) Ellis Ferreira (2) (United States) Patrick Galbraith	(Germany) Marc-Kevin Goellner (Germany) David Prinosil	6–3, 6–4
1998	(Russia) Yevgeni Kafelnikov (2) (Czech Republic) Daniel Vacek (2)	(South Africa) David Adams (South Africa) John-Laffnie de Jager	7–5, 6–3
1999	(Germany) David Prinosil (Australia) Sandon Stolle	(South Africa) Piet Norval (Zimbabwe) Kevin Ullyett	6–3, 6–4
2000	(Russia) Yevgeni Kafelnikov (3) (Federal Republic of Yugoslavia) Nenad Zimonjić	(Czech Republic) Jiří Novák (Czech Republic) David Rikl	6–4, 6–4
2001	(Czech Republic) Martin Damm (Czech Republic) Radek Štěpánek	(Czech Republic) Jiří Novák (Czech Republic) David Rikl	6–3, 6–2
2002	(Australia) Joshua Eagle (Australia) Sandon Stolle (2)	(Czech Republic) Jiří Novák (Czech Republic) Radek Štěpánek	6–4, 6–3
2003	(Switzerland) Yves Allegro (Switzerland) Roger Federer	(India) Mahesh Bhupathi (Belarus) Max Mirnyi	7–6^{(9–7)}, 7–5
2004	(Czech Republic) Martin Damm (2) (Czech Republic) Cyril Suk	(Argentina) Gastón Etlis (Argentina) Martín Rodríguez	6–7^{(4–7)}, 6–4, 7–6^{(7–4)}
2005	(The Bahamas) Mark Knowles (Canada) Daniel Nestor	(Israel) Jonathan Erlich (Israel) Andy Ram	5–3, 5–4^{(7–2)} (Note: Sets were played to five games)
2006	(Czech Republic) Petr Pála (Czech Republic) Pavel Vízner	(Austria) Julian Knowle (Austria) Jürgen Melzer	6–4, 3–6, [12–10]
2007	(Poland) Mariusz Fyrstenberg (Poland) Marcin Matkowski	(Germany) Tomas Behrend (Germany) Christopher Kas	6–4, 6–2
2008	(Belarus) Max Mirnyi (Israel) Andy Ram	(Germany) Philipp Petzschner (Austria) Alexander Peya	6–1, 7–5
↓ ATP Tour 250 ↓
2009	(Poland) Łukasz Kubot (Austria) Oliver Marach	(Austria) Julian Knowle (Austria) Jürgen Melzer	2–6, 6–4, [11–9]
2010	(Canada) Daniel Nestor (2) (Serbia) Nenad Zimonjić (2)	(Poland) Mariusz Fyrstenberg (Poland) Marcin Matkowski	7–5, 3–6, [10–5]
2011	(United States) Bob Bryan (United States) Mike Bryan	(Belarus) Max Mirnyi (Canada) Daniel Nestor	7–6^{(12–10)}, 6–3
2012	(Germany) Andre Begemann (Germany) Martin Emmrich	(Austria) Julian Knowle (Slovakia) Filip Polášek	6–4, 3–6, [10–4]
2013	(Romania) Florin Mergea (Czech Republic) Lukáš Rosol	(Austria) Julian Knowle (Canada) Daniel Nestor	7–5, 6–4
2014	(Austria) Jürgen Melzer (Germany) Philipp Petzschner	(Germany) Andre Begemann (Austria) Julian Knowle	7–6^{(8–6)}, 4–6, [10–7]
↓ ATP Tour 500 ↓
2015	(Poland) Łukasz Kubot (2) (Brazil) Marcelo Melo	(United Kingdom) Jamie Murray (Australia) John Peers	4–6, 7–6^{(7–3)}, [10–6]
2016	(Poland) Łukasz Kubot (3) (Brazil) Marcelo Melo (2)	(Austria) Oliver Marach (France) Fabrice Martin	4–6, 6–3, [13–11]
2017	(India) Rohan Bopanna (Uruguay) Pablo Cuevas	(Brazil) Marcelo Demoliner (United States) Sam Querrey	7–6^{(9–7)}, 6–7^{(4–7)}, [11–9]
2018	(United Kingdom) Joe Salisbury (United Kingdom) Neal Skupski	(United States) Mike Bryan (France) Édouard Roger-Vasselin	7–6^{(7–5)}, 6–3
2019	(United States) Rajeev Ram (United Kingdom) Joe Salisbury (2)	(Poland) Łukasz Kubot (Brazil) Marcelo Melo	6–4, 6–7^{(7–5)}, [10–5]
2020	(Poland) Łukasz Kubot (4) (Brazil) Marcelo Melo (3)	(United Kingdom) Jamie Murray (United Kingdom) Neal Skupski	7–6^{(7–5)}, 7–5
2021	(Colombia) Juan Sebastián Cabal (Colombia) Robert Farah	(United States) Rajeev Ram (United Kingdom) Joe Salisbury	6–4, 6–2
2022	(Austria) Alexander Erler (Austria) Lucas Miedler	(Mexico) Santiago González (Argentina) Andrés Molteni	6–3, 7–6^{(7–1)}
2023	(United States) Rajeev Ram (2) (United Kingdom) Joe Salisbury (3)	(United States) Nathaniel Lammons (United States) Jackson Withrow	6–4, 5–7, [12–10]
2024	(Austria) Alexander Erler (2) (Austria) Lucas Miedler (2)	(United Kingdom) Neal Skupski (New Zealand) Michael Venus	4–6, 6–3, [10–1]
2025	(United Kingdom) Lloyd Glasspool (United Kingdom) Julian Cash	(Portugal) Francisco Cabral (Austria) Lucas Miedler	6–1, 7–6^{(8–6)}
2026	(Austria) Neil Oberleitner (Austria) Lucas Miedler (3)	(United States) Ryan Seggerman (United States) Learner Tien	6–1, 7–5
