= 1989 Benson and Hedges Open =

- Date: 9–16 January
- Edition: 22nd
- Category: Grand Prix
- Draw: 32S / 16D
- Prize money: $115,000
- Surface: Hard / outdoor
- Location: Auckland, New Zealand

Champions

Singles
- (India) Ramesh Krishnan

Doubles
- (New Zealand) Steve Guy / (Japan) Shuzo Matsuoka
| ← 1988 · | ATP Auckland Open | · 1990 → |

The 1989 Benson and Hedges Open was a men's Grand Prix tennis tournament held in Auckland, New Zealand. It was the 22nd of the tournament and was held from 9 January to 16 January 1989. Second-seeded Ramesh Krishnan won the singles title.

== Finals ==
=== Singles ===
(India) Ramesh Krishnan defeated (Israel) Amos Mansdorf 6–4, 6–0

- It was Krishnan's only title of the year and the 8th of his career.

=== Doubles ===
(New Zealand) Steve Guy / (Japan) Shuzo Matsuoka defeated (United States) John Letts / (United States) Bruce Man-Son-Hing 7–6, 7–6

- It was Guy's only title of the year and the 1st of his career. It was Matsuoka's only title of the year and the 1st of his career.
