= 1990 Benson and Hedges Open – Doubles =

Doubles
- 1990 Benson and Hedges Open

Final
- Champions: (United States) Kelly Jones (United States) Robert Van't Hof
- Runners-up: (Israel) Gilad Bloom (Netherlands) Paul Haarhuis
- Score: 7–6, 6–0

Details
- Draw: 16
- Seeds: 4

Events
Singles	Doubles
← 1989 ·	ATP Auckland Open	· 1991 →

Steve Guy and Shuzo Matsuoka were the defending champions but did not compete that year.

Kelly Jones and Robert Van't Hof won in the final 7–6, 6–0 against Gilad Bloom and Paul Haarhuis.

== Seeds ==
1. (United States) Tim Pawsat / (Australia) Laurie Warder (first round)
2. (Canada) Grant Connell / (United States) Scott Davis (first round)
3. (United States) Glenn Layendecker / (United States) Richey Reneberg (first round)
4. (United States) Paul Chamberlin / (United States) Tim Wilkison (first round)

== Draw ==
=== Key ===
- Q = Qualifier
- WC = Wild card
- LL = Lucky loser
- Alt = Alternate
- SE = Special exempt
- PR = Protected ranking
- ITF = ITF entry
- JE = Junior exempt
- w/o = Walkover
- r = Retired
- d = Defaulted
- SR = Special ranking

First round
1	(United States) T Pawsat (Australia) L Warder	6	6	4
(United States) S DeVries (Australia) D Macpherson	7	3	6
(Venezuela) A Mora (United States) J Schor	6	6	6
(West Germany) P Ballauff (West Germany) R Osterthun	7	4	7
4	(United States) P Chamberlin (United States) T Wilkison	5	6
(United States) C Beckman (United States) L Jensen	7	7
(New Zealand) K Evernden (New Zealand) B Steven	6	4	2
Q	(Israel) G Bloom (Netherlands) P Haarhuis	2	6	6
(Canada) M Laurendeau (Canada) G Michibata	3	6	3
(Czechoslovakia) K Nováček (Czechoslovakia) C Suk	6	4	6
(United States) P Galbraith (United States) G Van Emburgh	6	6
3	(United States) G Layendecker (United States) R Reneberg	4	4
(United States) K Jones (United States) R Van't Hof	6	6
(France) O Delaître (Sweden) M Gustafsson	4	3
(West Germany) U Riglewski (West Germany) M Stich	7	6
2	(Canada) G Connell (United States) S Davis	6	1

Quarterfinals
(United States) S DeVries (Australia) D Macpherson	3	6	6
(West Germany) P Ballauff (West Germany) R Osterthun	6	0	4
(United States) C Beckman (United States) L Jensen	3	4
Q	(Israel) G Bloom (Netherlands) P Haarhuis	6	6
(Czechoslovakia) K Nováček (Czechoslovakia) C Suk	3	5
(United States) P Galbraith (United States) G Van Emburgh	6	7
(United States) K Jones (United States) R Van't Hof	3	6	6
(West Germany) U Riglewski (West Germany) M Stich	6	1	1

Semifinals
(United States) S DeVries (Australia) D Macpherson	6	6	1
Q	(Israel) G Bloom (Netherlands) P Haarhuis	1	7	6
(United States) P Galbraith (United States) G Van Emburgh	2	4
(United States) K Jones (United States) R Van't Hof	6	6

Final
Q	(Israel) G Bloom (Netherlands) P Haarhuis	6	0
(United States) K Jones (United States) R Van't Hof	7	6
