= 1992 Benson and Hedges Open – Doubles =

Doubles
- 1992 Benson and Hedges Open

Final
- Champions: (South Africa) Wayne Ferreira (United States) Jim Grabb
- Runners-up: (Canada) Grant Connell (Canada) Glenn Michibata
- Score: 6–4, 6–3

Details
- Draw: 16 (2WC/1Q)
- Seeds: 4

Events
Singles	Doubles
← 1991 ·	ATP Auckland Open	· 1993 →

Sergio Casal and Emilio Sánchez were the defending champions, but did not participate this year.

Wayne Ferreira and Jim Grabb won the title, defeating Grant Connell and Glenn Michibata 6–4, 6–3 in the final.

== Seeds ==
1. (Canada) Grant Connell / (Canada) Glenn Michibata (final)
2. (South Africa) Wayne Ferreira / (United States) Jim Grabb (champions)
3. (Netherlands) Paul Haarhuis / (Netherlands) Mark Koevermans (quarterfinals)
4. (United States) Charles Beckman / (United States) Sven Salumaa (first round)

== Draw ==
=== Key ===
- Q = Qualifier
- WC = Wild card
- LL = Lucky loser
- Alt = Alternate
- SE = Special exempt
- PR = Protected ranking
- ITF = ITF entry
- JE = Junior exempt
- w/o = Walkover
- r = Retired
- d = Defaulted
- SR = Special ranking

=== Draw ===
First round
1	(Canada) G Connell (Canada) G Michibata	6	7
(Argentina) P Albano (United States) S Cannon	3	5
(United States) K Kinnear (United States) T Scherman	4	6	6
(Czechoslovakia) K Nováček (Netherlands) M Oosting	6	4	4
4	(United States) C Beckman (United States) S Salumaa	5	7	4
WC	(New Zealand) K Evernden (New Zealand) B Steven	7	6	6
(Netherlands) J Eltingh (Netherlands) T Kempers	7	2	4
(Brazil) R Acioly (Sweden) T Svantesson	6	6	6
(Argentina) J Frana (Argentina) C Miniussi	6	3	6
(Ecuador) A Gómez (Brazil) J Oncins	2	6	3
(Netherlands) M Schapers (Czechoslovakia) D Vacek	4	4
3	(Netherlands) P Haarhuis (Netherlands) M Koevermans	6	6
Q	(South Africa) D Adams (Israel) G Bloom	5	6	4
WC	(New Zealand) S Guy (New Zealand) A Hunt	7	2	6
(United States) J Brown (United States) S Melville	4	5
2	(South Africa) W Ferreira (United States) J Grabb	6	7

Quarterfinals
1	(Canada) G Connell (Canada) G Michibata	6	6
(United States) K Kinnear (United States) T Scherman	2	3
WC	(New Zealand) K Evernden (New Zealand) B Steven	6	6
(Brazil) R Acioly (Sweden) T Svantesson	4	3
(Argentina) J Frana (Argentina) C Miniussi	6	2	6
3	(Netherlands) P Haarhuis (Netherlands) M Koevermans	3	6	4
WC	(New Zealand) S Guy (New Zealand) A Hunt	4	5
2	(South Africa) W Ferreira (United States) J Grabb	6	7

Semifinals
1	(Canada) G Connell (Canada) G Michibata	6	5	7
WC	(New Zealand) K Evernden (New Zealand) B Steven	3	7	6
(Argentina) J Frana (Argentina) C Miniussi	6	4	4
2	(South Africa) W Ferreira (United States) J Grabb	3	6	6

Final
1	(Canada) G Connell (Canada) G Michibata	4	3
2	(South Africa) W Ferreira (United States) J Grabb	6	6
