= 1989 Benson and Hedges Open – Singles =

Singles
- 1989 Benson and Hedges Open

Final
- Champion: (India) Ramesh Krishnan
- Runner-up: (Israel) Amos Mansdorf
- Score: 6–4, 6–0

Details
- Draw: 32 (4 Q / 3 WC )
- Seeds: 8

Events
Singles	Doubles
← 1988 ·	ATP Auckland Open	· 1990 →

Ramesh Krishnan defeated Amos Mansdorf 6–4, 6–0 to win the 1989 Benson and Hedges Open singles competition. Mansdorf was the defending champion.

== Seeds ==
A champion seed is indicated in bold text while text in italics indicates the round in which that seed was eliminated.

1. (Israel) Amos Mansdorf (final)
2. (India) Ramesh Krishnan **(champion)**
3. (Czechoslovakia) Milan Šrejber (second round)
4. (Netherlands) Michiel Schapers (first round)
5. (United States) Richard Matuszewski (first round)
6. (Argentina) Horacio de la Peña (second round)
7. (Japan) Shuzo Matsuoka (first round)
8. (United States) Jim Grabb (quarterfinals)

== Draw ==
=== Key ===
- Q – Qualifier
- WC –Wild card
- LL – l=Lucky loser

First round
1	(Israel) **A Mansdorf**	**6**	**6**
(Netherlands) M Oosting	4	4
LL	(Portugal) J Cunha-Silva	1	4
Q	(United States) **D Wheaton**	**6**	**6**
(Canada) C Pridham	**7**	6	5
(West Germany) **M Westphal**	6	**7**	**7**
(Kenya) **P Wekesa**	**7**	**6**
7	(Japan) S Matsuoka	6	2
4	(Netherlands) M Schapers	4	4
(United States) **P Chamberlin**	**6**	**6**
(The Bahamas) **R Smith**	**6**	**7**
WC	(New Zealand) S Lewis	3	6
(New Zealand) S Guy	1	**7**	1
(New Zealand) **K Evernden**	**6**	6	**6**
(West Germany) **U Riglewski**	**6**	4	**6**
5	(United States) R Matuszewski	1	**6**	2
WC/6	(Argentina) **H de la Peña**	**6**	3	**6**
Q	(Italy) G Pozzi	3	**6**	2
(Australia) B Dyke	2	**7**	4
(Canada) **G Michibata**	**6**	6	**6**
(United States) **R Reneberg**	**6**	4	**6**
(Brazil) D Marcelino	3	**6**	3
(Finland) V Paloheimo	5	**7**	3
3	(Czechoslovakia) **M Šrejber**	**7**	6	**6**
8	(United States) **J Grabb**	**6**	**7**
Q	(United States) J Ross	4	5
(United States) J Brown	4	**6**	7
Q	(United States) **R Weiss**	**6**	1	**9**
(Sweden) **T Svantesson**	**6**	**7**
WC	(New Zealand) A Lobb	2	6
(United States) M Kures	1	6
2	(India) **R Krishnan**	**6**	**7**

Second round
1	(Israel) **A Mansdorf**	**7**	**6**
Q	(United States) D Wheaton	5	1
(West Germany) M Westphal	**6**	3	7
(Kenya) **P Wekesa**	4	**6**	**9**
(United States) P Chamberlin	2	6
(The Bahamas) **R Smith**	**6**	**7**
(New Zealand) **K Evernden**	**6**	3	**6**
(West Germany) U Riglewski	4	**6**	4
WC/6	(Argentina) H de la Peña	**6**	5	2
(Canada) **G Michibata**	3	**7**	**6**
(United States) **R Reneberg**	**6**	**6**
3	(Czechoslovakia) M Šrejber	3	4
8	(United States) **J Grabb**	1	**6**	**6**
Q	(United States) R Weiss	**6**	2	0
(Sweden) T Svantesson	3	3
2	(India) **R Krishnan**	**6**	**6**

Quarterfinals
1	(Israel) **A Mansdorf**	**6**	2	**6**
(Kenya) P Wekesa	4	**6**	2
(The Bahamas) **R Smith**	**7**	**6**
(New Zealand) K Evernden	5	2
(Canada) G Michibata	1	3
(United States) **R Reneberg**	**6**	**6**
8	(United States) J Grabb	5	0
2	(India) **R Krishnan**	**7**	**6**

Semifinals
1	(Israel) **A Mansdorf**	**6**	**6**
(The Bahamas) R Smith	3	2
(United States) R Reneberg	6	3
2	(India) **R Krishnan**	**7**	**6**

Final
1	(Israel) Amos Mansdorf	4	0
2	(India) **Ramesh Krishnan**	**6**	**6**
