= 1988 Benson and Hedges Open – Doubles =

Doubles
- 1988 Benson and Hedges Open

Final
- Champion: (United States) Martin Davis (United States) Tim Pawsat
- Runner-up: (United States) Sammy Giammalva Jr. (United States) Jim Grabb
- Score: 6–3, 3–6. 6–4

Details
- Draw: 16
- Seeds: 4

Events
Singles	Doubles
← 1987 ·	ATP Auckland Open	· 1989 →

The 1988 Benson and Hedges Open – Doubles was an event of the 1988 Benson and Hedges Open men's tennis tournament played on outdoor hard courts in Auckland, New Zealand between 4 January and 11 January 1988. The draw consisted of 16 teams of which four were seeded. Kelly Jones and Brad Pearce were the defending doubles champions but they did not compete together in this edition.

The third-seeded team of Martin Davis and Tim Pawsat won the doubles title after a 6–3, 3–6. 6–4 win in the final against top-seeded Sammy Giammalva Jr. and Jim Grabb.

== Seeds ==
1. (United States) Sammy Giammalva Jr. / (United States) Jim Grabb (final)
2. (United States) Tim Wilkison / (United States) Todd Witsken (semifinals)
3. (United States) Marty Davis / (United States) Tim Pawsat (champions)
4. (Sweden) Jonas Svensson / (Sweden) Magnus Tideman (semifinals)

== Draw ==
=== Key ===
- Q = Qualifier
- WC = Wild card
- LL = Lucky loser
- Alt = Alternate
- SE = Special exempt
- PR = Protected ranking
- ITF = ITF entry
- JE = Junior exempt
- w/o = Walkover
- r = Retired
- d = Defaulted
- SR = Special ranking

First Round
1	(United States) Sammy Giammalva Jr. (United States) Jim Grabb	6	3	6
(Sweden) Magnus Gustafsson (New Zealand) Brett Steven	2	6	1
(Sweden) Christian Bergström (Italy) Claudio Pistolesi	4	2
(United States) Dan Goldie (United States) Larry Scott	6	6
4	(Sweden) Jonas Svensson (Sweden) Magnus Tideman	6	6
(United States) Kelly Jones (United States) Todd Nelson	4	2
(Canada) Grant Connell (Canada) Glenn Michibata	4	4
(United States) Dan Cassidy (United States) Jon Levine	6	6
(West Germany) Carl-Uwe Steeb (West Germany) Christian Saceanu	7	6
(Italy) Omar Camporese (Italy) Paolo Canè	6	2
(India) Ramesh Krishnan (United States) Bill Scanlon	6	3	3
3	(United States) Marty Davis (United States) Tim Pawsat	2	6	6
(United Kingdom) Jeremy Bates (Sweden) Peter Lundgren	7	5	6
(West Germany) Patrik Kühnen (West Germany) Alexander Mronz	6	7	2
(New Zealand) Bruce Derlin (West Germany) Damir Keretić	1	2
2	(United States) Tim Wilkison (United States) Todd Witsken	6	6

Quarterfinals
1	(United States) Sammy Giammalva Jr. (United States) Jim Grabb	6	4	11
(United States) Dan Goldie (United States) Larry Scott	3	6	9
4	(Sweden) Jonas Svensson (Sweden) Magnus Tideman	6	6
(United States) Dan Cassidy (United States) Jon Levine	3	2
(West Germany) Carl-Uwe Steeb (West Germany) Christian Saceanu	1	1
3	(United States) Marty Davis (United States) Tim Pawsat	6	6
(United Kingdom) Jeremy Bates (Sweden) Peter Lundgren	3	1
2	(United States) Tim Wilkison (United States) Todd Witsken	6	6

Semifinals
1	(United States) Sammy Giammalva Jr. (United States) Jim Grabb	6	6
4	(Sweden) Jonas Svensson (Sweden) Magnus Tideman	2	3
3	(United States) Marty Davis (United States) Tim Pawsat	4	7	6
2	(United States) Tim Wilkison (United States) Todd Witsken	6	6	4

Final
1	(United States) Sammy Giammalva Jr. (United States) Jim Grabb	3	6	4
3	(United States) Marty Davis (United States) Tim Pawsat	6	3	6
