= 1987 Benson and Hedges Open – Singles =

Singles
- 1987 Benson and Hedges Open

Final
- Champion: (Czechoslovakia) Miloslav Mečíř
- Runner-up: (Netherlands) Michiel Schapers
- Score: 6–2, 6–3, 6–4

Details
- Draw: 32 (4 Q / 3 WC )
- Seeds: 8

Events
Singles	Doubles
← 1986 ·	ATP Auckland Open	· 1988 →

Miloslav Mečíř defeated Michiel Schapers 6–2, 6–3, 6–4 to win the 1987 Heineken Open singles competition. Mark Woodforde was the defending champion.

== Seeds ==
A champion seed is indicated in bold text while text in italics indicates the round in which that seed was eliminated.

1. (Czechoslovakia) Miloslav Mečíř **(champion)**
2. (Czechoslovakia) Milan Šrejber (second round)
3. (India) Ramesh Krishnan (quarterfinals)
4. (United States) Marcel Freeman (quarterfinals)
5. (United States) Derrick Rostagno (semifinals)
6. (Nigeria) Nduka Odizor (first round)
7. (Netherlands) Michiel Schapers (final)
8. (United States) Bill Scanlon (first round)

== Draw ==
=== Key ===
- Q – Qualifier
- WC – Wild card
- NB: The Final was the best of 5 sets while all other rounds were the best of 3 sets.

=== Final ===
Final
1	(Czechoslovakia) **Miloslav Mečíř**	**6**	**6**	**6**
7	(Netherlands) Michiel Schapers	2	3	4

=== Section 1 ===
First round
1	(Czechoslovakia) **M Mečíř**	**6**	**7**
(Australia) P Doohan	2	6
Q	(United States) R Schmidt	**7**	4	4
(Canada) **G Michibata**	5	**6**	**6**
WC	(New Zealand) **B Steven**	**7**	**7**
(Argentina) J Frana	6	5
WC	(New Zealand) **B Derlin**	**6**	**7**
8	(United States) B Scanlon	3	6
3	(India) **R Krishnan**	**7**	**6**
(United States) B Green	5	2
(Sweden) **J Carlsson**	4	**6**	**6**
WC	(New Zealand) K Evernden	**6**	3	4
Q	(Italy) C Pistolesi	6	4
(United States) **M Davis**	**7**	**6**
(United States) J Lapidus	5	3
5	(United States) **D Rostagno**	**7**	**6**

Second round
1	(Czechoslovakia) **M Mečíř**	**6**	**6**
(Canada) G Michibata	3	3
WC	(New Zealand) B Steven	6	3
WC	(New Zealand) **B Derlin**	**7**	**6**
3	(India) **R Krishnan**	**6**	**6**
(Sweden) J Carlsson	3	1
(United States) M Davis	6	2
5	(United States) **D Rostagno**	**7**	**6**

Quarterfinals
1	(Czechoslovakia) **M Mečíř**	**6**	**6**
WC	(New Zealand) B Derlin	2	2
3	(India) R Krishnan	3	**7**	8
5	(United States) **D Rostagno**	**6**	6	**10**

Semifinals
1	(Czechoslovakia) **M Mečíř**	**6**	**6**
5	(United States) D Rostagno	2	1

=== Section 2 ===
First round
6	(Nigeria) N Odizor	3	4
Q	(Australia) **P Serret**	**6**	**6**
(Australia) **C Limberger**	**6**	6	**6**
(Israel) G Bloom	3	**7**	4
Q	(United States) J Letts	3	2
(Australia) **W Masur**	**6**	**6**
(United States) J Levine	**6**	2	1
4	(United States) **M Freeman**	4	**6**	**6**
7	(Netherlands) **M Schapers**	**6**	**7**
(New Zealand) S Guy	3	6
(Australia) **M Woodforde**	**6**	3	**6**
(Australia) D Cahill	1	**6**	2
(United States) **B Schultz**	**6**	**6**
(United States) B Pearce	4	1
(United States) K Jones	4	5
2	(Czechoslovakia) **M Šrejber**	**6**	**7**

Second round
Q	(Australia) P Serret	4	4
(Australia) **C Limberger**	**6**	**6**
(Australia) W Masur	**6**	3	6
4	(United States) **M Freeman**	3	**6**	**8**
7	(Netherlands) **M Schapers**	**6**	1	**8**
(Australia) M Woodforde	3	**6**	6
(United States) **B Schultz**	2	**6**	**6**
2	(Czechoslovakia) M Šrejber	**6**	4	4

Quarterfinals
(Australia) **C Limberger**	**6**	3	**6**
4	(United States) M Freeman	2	**6**	4
7	(Netherlands) **M Schapers**	**7**	2	**6**
(United States) B Schultz	6	**6**	4

Semifinals
4	(United States) M Freeman	**6**	3	4
7	(Netherlands) **M Schapers**	2	**6**	**6**
