= 1989 Lipton International Players Championships – Men's singles =

Men's singles
- 1989 Lipton International Players Championships

Final
- Champion: (Czechoslovakia) Ivan Lendl
- Runner-up: (Austria) Thomas Muster
- Score: Walkover

Details
- Draw: 128
- Seeds: 32

Events
Singles	men	women
Doubles	men	women
← 1988 ·	Lipton International Players Championships	· 1990 →

Mats Wilander was the defending champion but lost in the third round to Alberto Mancini.

Ivan Lendl won the final on a walkover against Thomas Muster. Muster had his left knee ligaments severed when he was hit by a drunk driver just hours after winning his semi final match.

== Seeds ==
1. (Czechoslovakia) Ivan Lendl (champion)
2. (Sweden) Mats Wilander (third round)
3. (United States) Andre Agassi (first round)
4. (United States) Jimmy Connors (fourth round)
5. (Switzerland) Jakob Hlasek (fourth round)
6. (United States) Tim Mayotte (first round)
7. (Austria) Thomas Muster (final, withdrew)
8. (Czechoslovakia) Miloslav Mečíř (second round, withdrew)
9. (Argentina) Guillermo Pérez Roldán (second round)
10. (United States) Aaron Krickstein (quarterfinals)
11. (Spain) Emilio Sánchez (quarterfinals)
12. (France) Yannick Noah (semifinals)
13. (United States) Kevin Curren (semifinals)
14. (Sweden) Mikael Pernfors (fourth round)
15. (Ecuador) Andrés Gómez (fourth round)
16. (Australia) Darren Cahill (third round)
17. (Haiti) Ronald Agénor (first round)
18. (Socialist Federal Republic of Yugoslavia) Slobodan Živojinović (second round)
19. (Sweden) Anders Järryd (second round)
20. (Soviet Union) Andrei Chesnokov (second round)
21. (France) Guy Forget (first round)
22. (Soviet Union) Alexander Volkov (third round)
23. (United States) Johan Kriek (first round)
24. (United States) Derrick Rostagno (first round)
25. (Australia) Mark Woodforde (second round)
26. (United States) Paul Annacone (first round)
27. (South Africa) Christo van Rensburg (third round)
28. (United States) Jay Berger (first round)
29. (Austria) Horst Skoff (third round)
30. (United States) Jim Courier (third round)
31. (Argentina) Alberto Mancini (fourth round)
32. (Sweden) Magnus Gustafsson (second round)

== Main draw ==
=== Key ===
- Q = Qualifier
- WC = Wild card
- LL = Lucky loser
- Alt = Alternate
- SE = Special exempt
- PR = Protected ranking
- ITF = ITF entry
- JE = Junior exempt
- w/o = Walkover
- r = Retired
- d = Defaulted
- SR = Special ranking

=== Finals ===
Quarterfinals
1	(Czechoslovakia) Ivan Lendl	6	6	6
10	(United States) Aaron Krickstein	2	2	2
13	(United States) Kevin Curren	6	6	6
11	(Spain) Emilio Sánchez	3	1	4
12	(France) Yannick Noah	6	6	6
(West Germany) Carl-Uwe Steeb	4	1	4
7	(Austria) Thomas Muster	7	7	1	6
(United States) Jim Grabb	5	6	6	0

Semifinals
1	(Czechoslovakia) Ivan Lendl	6	6	6
13	(United States) Kevin Curren	2	2	3
12	(France) Yannick Noah	7	6	3	3	2
7	(Austria) Thomas Muster	5	3	6	6	6

Final
1	(Czechoslovakia) Ivan Lendl	w/o
7	(Austria) Thomas Muster

=== Top half ===
==== Section 1 ====
First round
1	(Czechoslovakia) I Lendl	6	6	6
Q	(Australia) T Woodbridge	2	2	3
(United States) J Pugh	6	6	6
(Soviet Union) A Olhovskiy	2	3	2
(Italy) P Canè	6	6	6
(Sweden) N Kulti	2	3	2
(Czechoslovakia) T Šmíd	6	6	2	3	2
32	(Sweden) M Gustafsson	2	3	6	6	6
18	(Socialist Federal Republic of Yugoslavia) S Živojinović	6	7	3	6
Q	(United States) M Purcell	2	6	6	4
(Italy) C Panatta	6	5	1	2
Q	(United States) J Canter	2	7	6	6
(South Africa) P Aldrich	6	1	6	2	7
(Venezuela) N Pereira	4	6	4	6	6
(Sweden) J Gunnarsson	7	6	2	6	1
15	(Ecuador) A Gómez	6	7	6	3	6

Second round
1	(Czechoslovakia) I Lendl	6	6	6
(United States) J Pugh	3	1	1
(Italy) P Canè	7	5	6	6
32	(Sweden) M Gustafsson	6	7	0	4
18	(Socialist Federal Republic of Yugoslavia) S Živojinović	2	6	4	0
Q	(United States) J Canter	6	4	6	6
(South Africa) P Aldrich	6	5	3	6
15	(Ecuador) A Gómez	3	7	6	7

Third round
1	(Czechoslovakia) I Lendl	7	6	6
(Italy) P Canè	5	0	4
Q	(United States) J Canter	6	6	4
15	(Ecuador) A Gómez	7	7	6

Fourth round
1	(Czechoslovakia) I Lendl	6	6	6
15	(Ecuador) A Gómez	4	2	4

==== Section 2 ====
First round
10	(United States) A Krickstein	4	3	7	6	7
(Brazil) L Mattar	6	6	6	0	6
(Kenya) P Wekesa	6	6	6
Q	(Israel) G Bloom	1	3	3
(United States) M Anger	6	6	6
(South Africa) D Visser	3	3	3
Q	(West Germany) A Mronz	6	6	6
24	(United States) D Rostagno	4	3	2
25	(Australia) M Woodforde	7	6	6
(Netherlands) M Schapers	6	2	3
(Finland) V Paloheimo	4	3	4
(Argentina) H de la Peña	6	6	6
Q	(United States) B Pearce	6	6	6	1	4
(Peru) J Yzaga	0	7	2	6	6
(Italy) C Pistolesi	3	2	4
8	(Czechoslovakia) M Mečíř	6	6	6

Second round
10	(United States) A Krickstein	6	6	7
(Kenya) P Wekesa	3	1	6
(United States) M Anger	7	6	7	1	4
Q	(West Germany) A Mronz	6	7	5	6	6
25	(Australia) M Woodforde	6	6	1	1	3
(Argentina) H de la Peña	4	2	6	6	6
(Peru) J Yzaga	w/o
8	(Czechoslovakia) M Mečíř

Third round
10	(United States) A Krickstein	4	6	6	6	7
Q	(West Germany) A Mronz	6	1	2	7	6
(Argentina) H de la Peña	4	6	4	6
(Peru) J Yzaga	6	4	6	7

Fourth round
10	(United States) A Krickstein	3	7	6	6
(Peru) J Yzaga	6	6	3	3

==== Section 3 ====
First round
4	(United States) J Connors	6	7	6
LL	(United States) R Matuszewski	3	5	4
(France) O Delaître	5	6	3	2
Q	(France) A Boetsch	7	2	6	6
(Switzerland) C Mezzadri	6	7	6
(West Germany) P Baur	3	5	4
(Brazil) D Marcelino	1	5	3
29	(Austria) H Skoff	6	7	6
20	(Soviet Union) A Chesnokov	6	6	6
(Italy) O Camporese	3	2	4
(United States) S Davis	6	6	7
(Spain) S Casal	4	3	6
(Sweden) T Svantesson	2	6	6	3
(Australia) J Stoltenberg	6	7	4	6
(United States) G Layendecker	7	6	1	2	2
13	(United States) K Curren	6	4	6	6	6

Second round
4	(United States) J Connors	7	6	6
Q	(France) A Boetsch	6	1	1
(Switzerland) C Mezzadri	3	2	6	1
29	(Austria) H Skoff	6	6	2	6
20	(Soviet Union) A Chesnokov	6	3	1
(United States) S Davis	7	6	6
(Australia) J Stoltenberg	2	2	0
13	(United States) K Curren	6	6	6

Third round
4	(United States) J Connors	6	7	6
29	(Austria) H Skoff	2	6	1
(United States) S Davis	6	3	4	7	6
13	(United States) K Curren	3	6	6	6	4

Fourth round
4	(United States) J Connors	6	6	3	4	2
13	(United States) K Curren	4	4	6	6	6

==== Section 4 ====
First round
11	(Spain) E Sánchez	6	6	6
Q	(United States) J Brown	0	1	3
(South Africa) B Moir	4	6	4	5
(Japan) S Matsuoka	6	3	6	7
(Sweden) C Bergström	6	6	6
(United States) P Sampras	4	1	1
(France) T Champion	6	6	6	6
21	(France) G Forget	4	7	2	0
27	(South Africa) C van Rensburg	7	6	6
Q	(Canada) M Laurendeau	6	4	3
(United States) L Duncan	6	6	6
(Socialist Federal Republic of Yugoslavia) G Ivanišević	0	4	2
(Netherlands) T Nijssen	6	6	6
(United States) L Shiras	2	4	4
(New Zealand) K Evernden	6	6	3	6
6	(United States) T Mayotte	3	4	6	2

Second round
11	(Spain) E Sánchez	7	6	6
(Japan) S Matsuoka	5	3	4
(Sweden) C Bergström	7	6	6
(France) T Champion	5	4	2
27	(South Africa) C van Rensburg	6	6	7
(United States) L Duncan	3	2	5
(Netherlands) T Nijssen	7	6	6	6
(New Zealand) K Evernden	6	4	7	2

Third round
11	(Spain) E Sánchez	4	7	6	6
(Sweden) C Bergström	6	5	3	3
27	(South Africa) C van Rensburg	6	2	5	7	4
(Netherlands) T Nijssen	3	6	7	6	6

Fourth round
11	(Spain) E Sánchez	6	7	6
(Netherlands) T Nijssen	3	5	2

=== Bottom half ===
==== Section 5 ====
First round
5	(Switzerland) J Hlasek	2	6	3	6	6
(Spain) J Sánchez	6	1	6	3	2
(Italy) D Nargiso	6	1	7	6
(Italy) F Cancellotti	4	6	6	1
(Australia) M Kratzmann	6
(India) Z Ali	1	r
(France) J-P Fleurian	6	6	4	6
28	(United States) J Berger	0	3	6	1
22	(Soviet Union) A Volkov	5	6	6	6
(West Germany) C Saceanu	7	2	2	2
(Argentina) J Frana	6	3	4	1
(Australia) R Fromberg	4	6	6	6
Q	(United States) B Scanlon	4	6	7	7
Q	(United States) S Cannon	6	2	5	5
(The Bahamas) R Smith	5	2	4
12	(France) Y Noah	7	6	6

Second round
5	(Switzerland) J Hlasek	6	6	4	6
(Italy) D Nargiso	3	1	6	1
(Australia) M Kratzmann	4	7	6	7
(France) J-P Fleurian	6	6	4	6
22	(Soviet Union) A Volkov	6	6	7
(Australia) R Fromberg	3	1	5
Q	(United States) B Scanlon	6	5	6	1	3
12	(France) Y Noah	4	7	3	6	6

Third round
5	(Switzerland) J Hlasek	6	6	6
(Australia) M Kratzmann	4	0	4
22	(Soviet Union) A Volkov	7	7	5	3	4
12	(France) Y Noah	5	6	7	6	6

Fourth round
5	(Switzerland) J Hlasek	4	6	4	6	5
12	(France) Y Noah	6	3	6	2	7

==== Section 6 ====
First round
14	(Sweden) M Pernfors	6	6	7
Q	(United States) K Thorne	3	1	6
Q	(United States) G Holmes	6	6	6
(Sweden) P Lundgren	3	4	2
(Czechoslovakia) M Vajda	7	2	4	4
(Mexico) L Lavalle	5	6	6	6
(Argentina) F Davín	0	2	1
19	(Sweden) A Järryd	6	6	6
30	(United States) J Courier	6	1	6	7
(Australia) J Frawley	3	6	3	6
(West Germany) U Riglewski	6	6	2	6	5
(United States) J Rive	3	7	6	3	7
(United States) S Giammalva Jr.	3	6	6	6	6
(United States) J Arias	6	3	3	7	2
(West Germany) C-U Steeb	6	7	6
3	(United States) A Agassi	4	5	0

Second round
14	(Sweden) M Pernfors	6	7	6
Q	(United States) G Holmes	4	6	3
(Mexico) L Lavalle	2	6	6	6
19	(Sweden) A Järryd	6	2	3	2
30	(United States) J Courier	6	6	7	6
(United States) J Rive	7	2	6	4
(United States) S Giammalva Jr.	3	3	3
(West Germany) C-U Steeb	6	6	6

Third round
14	(Sweden) M Pernfors	1	6	6	6
(Mexico) L Lavalle	6	2	1	4
30	(United States) J Courier	4	6	5	6	4
(West Germany) C-U Steeb	6	4	7	4	6

Fourth round
14	(Sweden) M Pernfors	7	0	1	4
(West Germany) C-U Steeb	6	6	6	6

==== Section 7 ====
First round
7	(Austria) T Muster	7	7	6
LL	(Nigeria) N Odizor	5	5	3
(Canada) G Michibata	7	6	6
(South Africa) G Muller	5	3	2
(France) É Winogradsky	6	6	4
(Canada) A Sznajder	7	7	6
Q	(United States) D Cassidy	7	6	0	6
26	(United States) P Annacone	6	3	6	2
23	(United States) J Kriek	6	6	6
(India) R Krishnan	7	7	7
(Australia) C Limberger	4	2	0^{r}
(United States) T Wilkison	6	6	2
(Belgium) E Masso	3	1	0
(Argentina) E Bengoechea	6	6	6
(Brazil) C Motta	6	4	6	6	3
9	(Argentina) G Pérez Roldán	7	6	3	4	6

Second round
7	(Austria) T Muster	7	7	6
(Canada) G Michibata	5	6	2
(Canada) A Sznajder	6	4	2	6	6
Q	(United States) D Cassidy	2	6	6	2	4
(India) R Krishnan	6	7	6
(United States) T Wilkison	3	5	4
(Argentina) E Bengoechea	6	6	6	6
9	(Argentina) G Pérez Roldán	7	2	3	2

Third round
7	(Austria) T Muster	6	3	6	7
(Canada) A Sznajder	1	6	3	6
(India) R Krishnan	4	4	3
(Argentina) E Bengoechea	6	6	6

Fourth round
7	(Austria) T Muster	6	6	6
(Argentina) E Bengoechea	1	1	1

==== Section 8 ====
First round
16	(Australia) D Cahill	3	7	6	6
(Senegal) Y Doumbia	6	6	4	2
(United States) R Seguso	5	0	3
(Australia) B Drewett	7	6	6
(West Germany) H Moraing	6	1	4	3
(France) T Tulasne	4	6	6	6
(United States) J Grabb	6	7	3	7
17	(Haiti) R Agénor	4	6	6	6
31	(Argentina) A Mancini	7	6	4	6
Q	(United States) C Garner	6	2	6	3
(Canada) G Connell	1	6	4	6	4
(United States) M Davis	6	2	6	1	6
Q	(United States) S Warner	6	3	6	7
(Argentina) M Jaite	4	6	3	6
(United States) D Pate	6	5	2	6
2	(Sweden) M Wilander	4	7	6	7

Second round
16	(Australia) D Cahill	6	6	6	3	6
(Australia) B Drewett	7	1	3	6	4
(France) T Tulasne	1	3	7	4
(United States) J Grabb	6	6	6	6
31	(Argentina) A Mancini	7	6	6
(United States) M Davis	6	3	2
Q	(United States) S Warner	3	4	6
2	(Sweden) M Wilander	6	6	7

Third round
16	(Australia) D Cahill	4	6	6	1
(United States) J Grabb	6	0	7	6
31	(Argentina) A Mancini	3	6	6	6
2	(Sweden) M Wilander	6	3	4	3

Fourth round
(United States) J Grabb	6	6	7	6	6
31	(Argentina) A Mancini	7	4	6	7	4
