= 1992 Benson and Hedges Open – Singles =

Singles
- 1992 Benson and Hedges Open

Final
- Champion: (Peru) Jaime Yzaga
- Runner-up: (United States) MaliVai Washington
- Score: 7–6^{(8–6)}, 6–4

Details
- Draw: 32 (4 Q / 3 WC )
- Seeds: 8

Events
Singles	Doubles
← 1991 ·	ATP Auckland Open	· 1993 →

Jaime Yzaga defeated MaliVai Washington 7–6^{(8–6)}, 6–4 to win the 1992 Benson and Hedges Open singles competition. Karel Nováček was the defending champion.

== Seeds ==
A champion seed is indicated in BOLD text while text in italics indicates the round in which that seed was eliminated.

1. (Czechoslovakia) Karel Nováček (first round)
2. (Commonwealth of Independent States) Andrei Cherkasov (quarterfinals)
3. (Commonwealth of Independent States) Alexander Volkov (quarterfinals)
4. (Spain) Francisco Clavet (second round)
5. (Netherlands) Paul Haarhuis (second round)
6. (South Africa) Wayne Ferreira (first round)
7. (United States) MaliVai Washington (final)
8. (Italy) Renzo Furlan (first round)

== Draw ==
=== Key ===
- Q – Qualifier
- WC – Wild card

First round
1	(Czechoslovakia) K Nováček	6^{5}	6^{3}
(Netherlands) **J Eltingh**	**7^{7}**	**7^{7}**
(Sweden) L Jönsson	3	4
(Canada) **G Connell**	**6**	**6**
WC	(New Zealand) J Greenhalgh	4	2
(Argentina) **C Miniussi**	**6**	**6**
WC	(New Zealand) **K Evernden**	**7^{7}**	**7**
8	(Italy) R Furlan	6^{4}	5
4	(Spain) **F Clavet**	**6**	3	**6**
Q	(Czechoslovakia) M Vajda	4	**6**	3
(France) J Fleurian	2	**6**	2
(Peru) **J Yzaga**	**6**	1	**6**
(Argentina) **J Frana**	**6**	5	**7^{7}**
(Germany) L Koslowski	1	**7**	6^{4}
Q	(Germany) **M Naewie**	**6**	**6**
6	(South Africa) W Ferreira	1	1
5	(Netherlands) **P Haarhuis**	3	**6**	**6**
WC	(New Zealand) B Steven	**6**	4	3
(Germany) **M Zoecke**	4	**7**	**6**
(Netherlands) M Koevermans	**6**	5	3
(Germany) C Saceanu	2	3
Q	(Mexico) **L Lavalle**	**6**	**6**
(Switzerland) M Rosset	4	3
3	(Commonwealth of Independent States) **A Volkov**	**6**	**6**
7	(United States) **M Washington**	**6**	**6**
(Ecuador) Gómez	2	3
(France) F Fontang	5	6^{3}
(Japan) **S Matsuoka**	**7**	**7^{7}**
(Brazil) J Oncins	3	1
Q	(Commonwealth of Independent States) **A Olhovskiy**	**6**	**6**
(United States) J Grabb	4	**7^{7}**	4
2	(Commonwealth of Independent States) **A Cherkasov**	**6**	6^{4}	**6**

Second round
(Netherlands) J Eltingh	4	**6**	3
(Canada) **G Connell**	**6**	4	**6**
(Argentina) C Miniussi	3	3
WC	(New Zealand) **K Evernden**	**6**	**6**
4	(Spain) F Clavet	3	6^{4}
(Peru) **J Yzaga**	**6**	**7^{7}**
(Argentina) J Frana	2	3
Q	(Germany) **M Naewie**	**6**	**6**
5	(Netherlands) P Haarhuis	3	**6**	6^{2}
(Germany) **M Zoecke**	**6**	3	**7^{7}**
Q	(Mexico) L Lavalle	2	**6**	5
3	(Commonwealth of Independent States) **A Volkov**	**6**	4	**7**
7	(United States) **M Washington**	**6**	**6**
(Japan) S Matsuoka	3	4
Q	(Commonwealth of Independent States) A Olhovskiy	2	3
2	(Commonwealth of Independent States) **A Cherkasov**	**6**	**6**

Quarterfinals
(Canada) **G Connell**	**6**	**7^{10}**
WC	(New Zealand) K Evernden	4	6^{8}
(Peru) **J Yzaga**	**6**	**7^{7}**
Q	(Germany) M Naewie	3	6^{5}
(Germany) **M Zoecke**	**7^{7}**	**6**
3	(Commonwealth of Independent States) A Volkov	6^{5}	2
7	(United States) **M Washington**	**6**	**6**
2	(Commonwealth of Independent States) A Cherkasov	4	2

Semifinals
(Canada) G Connell	4	2
(Peru) **J Yzaga**	**6**	**6**
(Germany) M Zoecke	2	4
7	(United States) **M Washington**	**6**	**6**

Final
(Peru) **Jaime Yzaga**	**7^{8}**	**6**
7	(United States) MaliVai Washington	6^{6}	4
