= 1987 Benson and Hedges Open – Doubles =

Doubles
- 1987 Benson and Hedges Open

Final
- Champions: (United States) Kelly Jones (United States) Brad Pearce
- Runners-up: (Australia) Carl Limberger (Australia) Mark Woodforde
- Score: 7–6, 7–6

Details
- Draw: 16 (1 WC )
- Seeds: 4

Events
Singles	Doubles
- ATP Auckland Open

Broderick Dyke and Wally Masur were the defending champions, but none competed this year.

Kelly Jones and Brad Pearce won the title by defeating Carl Limberger and Mark Woodforde 7–6, 7–6 in the final.

== Seeds ==
1. (United States) Kelly Jones / (United States) Brad Pearce (champions)
2. (Nigeria) Nduka Odizor / (Netherlands) Michiel Schapers (first round)
3. (United States) Bob Green / (United States) John Letts (first round)
4. (Canada) Glenn Michibata / (United States) Bud Schultz (first round)

== Draw ==
Key

- Q = Qualifier
- WC = Wild card
- LL = Lucky loser
- Alt = Alternate
- ITF = ITF entry
- PR = Protected ranking
- SR = Special ranking
- SE = Special exempt
- JE = Junior exempt
- JR = Junior Accelerator Programme entrant
- CO = College Accelerator Programme entrant
- NG = Next Gen Accelerator Program entrant
- w/o = Walkover
- r = Retired
- d = Defaulted

=== Draw ===
First round
1	(United States) K Jones (United States) B Pearce	6	3	8
(United States) M Davis (United States) M Freeman	4	6	6
(Czechoslovakia) M Mečíř (Czechoslovakia) M Šrejber	7	6
(West Germany) P Kühnen (Switzerland) D Utzinger	6	3
4	(Canada) G Michibata (United States) B Schultz	7	5	4
(New Zealand) S Guy (Australia) P Serret	6	7	6
(New Zealand) B Derlin (India) R Krishnan	6	6
(United States) D Saltz (United States) T Siegel	4	2
(Australia) A Emerson (New Zealand) D Lewis	4	7	3
(Australia) C Limberger (Australia) M Woodforde	6	6	6
(United States) K Richter (United States) R Rudeen	4	6	6
3	(United States) B Green (United States) J Letts	6	1	4
(Israel) G Bloom (United States) J Levine	6	6	11
(Sweden) J Carlsson (Italy) C Pistolesi	7	1	9
WC	(New Zealand) D Mustard (New Zealand) B Steven	7	4	6
2	(Nigeria) N Odizor (Netherlands) M Schapers	6	6	3

Quarterfinals
1	(United States) K Jones (United States) B Pearce	7	7
(Czechoslovakia) M Mečíř (Czechoslovakia) M Šrejber	6	5
(New Zealand) S Guy (Australia) P Serret	6	0	7
(New Zealand) B Derlin (India) R Krishnan	3	6	5
(Australia) C Limberger (Australia) M Woodforde	6	6
(United States) K Richter (United States) R Rudeen	4	3
(Israel) G Bloom (United States) J Levine	6	6	6
WC	(New Zealand) D Mustard (New Zealand) B Steven	4	7	3

Semifinals
1	(United States) K Jones (United States) B Pearce	6	6
(New Zealand) S Guy (Australia) P Serret	3	4
(Australia) C Limberger (Australia) M Woodforde	7	6
(Israel) G Bloom (United States) J Levine	6	4

Final
1	(United States) K Jones (United States) B Pearce	7	7
(Australia) C Limberger (Australia) M Woodforde	6	6
