= 1991 Benson and Hedges Open – Singles =

Singles
- 1991 Benson and Hedges Open

Final
- Champion: (Czechoslovakia) Karel Nováček
- Runner-up: (France) Jean-Philippe Fleurian
- Score: 7–6^{(7–5)}, 7–6^{(7–4)}

Details
- Draw: 32 (4 Q / 3 WC )
- Seeds: 8

Events
Singles	Doubles
← 1990 ·	ATP Auckland Open	· 1992 →

Karel Nováček defeated Jean-Philippe Fleurian 7–6^{(7–5)}, 7–6^{(7–4)} to win the 1991 Benson and Hedges Open singles competition. Scott Davis was the champion but did not defend his title.

== Seeds ==
A champion seed is indicated in bold text while text in italics indicates the round in which that seed was eliminated.

1. (Spain) Emilio Sánchez (quarterfinals)
2. (Soviet Union) Andrei Chesnokov (second round)
3. (Australia) Richard Fromberg (first round)
4. (Czechoslovakia) Karel Nováček **(champion)**
5. (Brazil) Luiz Mattar (semifinals)
6. (Italy) Omar Camporese (second round)
7. (Austria) Alex Antonitsch (second round)
8. (Israel) Gilad Bloom (first round)

== Draw ==
=== Key ===
- Q – Qualifier
- WC – Wild card
- WO – Walkover

First round
1	(Spain) **E Sánchez**	**6**	**6**
(Italy) R Furlan	4	1
WC	(New Zealand) S Guy	3	2
Q	(United States) **M Washington**	**6**	**6**
WC	(New Zealand) B Steven	**6**	1	2
(France) **J Fleurian**	2	**6**	**6**
(Germany) **E Jelen**	**6**	1	**6**
8	(Israel) G Bloom	3	**6**	4
3	(Australia) R Fromberg	3	4
Q	(United States) **C Adams**	**6**	**6**
(Sweden) **C Bergström**	**6**	**6**
(Spain) J Sánchez	2	1
WC	(New Zealand) K Evernden	2	6^{6}
(Peru) **J Yzaga**	**6**	**7^{8}**
Q	(Sweden) D Engel	**6**	6^{5}	4
5	(Brazil) **L Mattar**	0	**7^{7}**	**6**
6	(Italy) **O Camporese**	**6**	**6**
(Spain) F Clavet	2	3
(Germany) M Sinner	**6**	2	3
(Sweden) **L Jönsson**	3	**6**	**6**
(Finland) V Paloheimo	5	**6**	4
Q	(Canada) **G Connell**	**7**	1	**6**
(Germany) A Mronz	**6**	5	3
4	(Czechoslovakia) **K Nováček**	3	**7**	**6**
7	(Austria) **A Antonitsch**	**6**	**6**
(Germany) U Riglewski	3	0
(India) R Krishnan	2	4
(Germany) **P Kühnen**	**6**	**6**
(Czechoslovakia) **M Vajda**	**6**	**6**
(United States) R Weiss	1	3
(Finland) A Rahunen	4	1
2	(Soviet Union) **A Chesnokov**	**6**	**6**

Second round
1	(Spain) **E Sánchez**	**6**	3	**7^{7}**
Q	(United States) M Washington	4	**6**	6^{5}
(France) **J Fleurian**	**6**	**6**
(Germany) E Jelen	3	1
Q	(United States) C Adams	3	**6**	6^{3}
(Sweden) **C Bergström**	**6**	4	**7^{7}**
(Peru) J Yzaga	2	2
5	(Brazil) **L Mattar**	**6**	**6**
6	(Italy) O Camporese	5	**6**	5
(Sweden) **L Jönsson**	**7**	3	**7**
Q	(Canada) G Connell	4	4
4	(Czechoslovakia) **K Nováček**	**6**	**6**
7	(Austria) A Antonitsch	**6**	4	5
(Germany) **P Kühnen**	4	**6**	**7**
(Czechoslovakia) **M Vajda**	**6**	5	**7**
2	(Soviet Union) A Chesnokov	1	**7**	5

Quarterfinals
1	(Spain) E Sánchez	2	6^{5}
(France) **J Fleurian**	**6**	**7^{7}**
(Sweden) C Bergström
5	(Brazil) **L Mattar**	WO
(Sweden) L Jönsson
4	(Czechoslovakia) **K Nováček**	WO
(Germany) P Kühnen	**6**	3	4
(Czechoslovakia) **M Vajda**	4	**6**	**6**

Semifinals
(France) **J Fleurian**	3	**6**	**6**
5	(Brazil) L Mattar	**6**	3	4
4	(Czechoslovakia) **K Nováček**	**6**	4	**6**
(Czechoslovakia) M Vajda	4	**6**	0

Final
(France) J-P Fleurian	6^{5}	6^{4}
4	(Czechoslovakia) **Karel Nováček**	**7^{7}**	**7^{7}**
