= 1989 Lipton International Players Championships – Men's doubles =

Men's doubles
- 1989 Lipton International Players Championships

Final
- Champions: (Switzerland) Jakob Hlasek (Sweden) Anders Järryd
- Runners-up: (United States) Jim Grabb (United States) Patrick McEnroe
- Score: 6–3 (Grabb / McEnroe retired)

Details
- Draw: 64
- Seeds: 16

Events
Singles	men	women
Doubles	men	women
- Lipton International Players Championships

John Fitzgerald and Anders Järryd were the defending champions but only Järryd competed that year with Jakob Hlasek.

Hlasek and Järryd won the final 6–3 after Jim Grabb and Patrick McEnroe were forced to retire.

== Seeds ==
1. (United States) Rick Leach / (United States) Jim Pugh (first round)
2. (United States) Ken Flach / (United States) Robert Seguso (second round)
3. (Spain) Sergio Casal / (Spain) Emilio Sánchez (third round)
4. (United States) Paul Annacone / (South Africa) Christo van Rensburg (third round)
5. (United States) Kevin Curren / (United States) David Pate (first round)
6. (Switzerland) Jakob Hlasek / (Sweden) Anders Järryd (champions)
7. (Czechoslovakia) Tomáš Šmíd / (Australia) Mark Woodforde (third round)
8. (United States) Jim Grabb / (United States) Patrick McEnroe (final)
9. (South Africa) Pieter Aldrich / (South Africa) Danie Visser (semifinals)
10. (United States) Scott Davis / (United States) Tim Wilkison (third round)
11. (United States) Martin Davis / (Australia) Brad Drewett (first round)
12. (Canada) Grant Connell / (Canada) Glenn Michibata (second round)
13. (Ecuador) Andrés Gómez / (Socialist Federal Republic of Yugoslavia) Slobodan Živojinović (quarterfinals)
14. (United States) Tim Pawsat / (Australia) Laurie Warder (second round)
15. (Australia) Darren Cahill / (Australia) Mark Kratzmann (quarterfinals)
16. (United States) Johan Kriek / (Denmark) Michael Mortensen (second round)

== Draw ==
Key

- Q = Qualifier
- WC = Wild card
- LL = Lucky loser
- Alt = Alternate
- ITF = ITF entry
- PR = Protected ranking
- SR = Special ranking
- SE = Special exempt
- JE = Junior exempt
- JR = Junior Accelerator Programme entrant
- CO = College Accelerator Programme entrant
- NG = Next Gen Accelerator Program entrant
- w/o = Walkover
- r = Retired
- d = Defaulted

=== Finals ===
Semifinals
8	(United States) Jim Grabb (United States) Patrick McEnroe	4	7	6	7	6
(United States) Sammy Giammalva Jr. (United States) Glenn Layendecker	6	5	7	5	2
6	(Switzerland) Jakob Hlasek (Sweden) Anders Järryd	7	4	6	7
9	(South Africa) Pieter Aldrich (South Africa) Danie Visser	5	6	2	5

Final
8	(United States) Jim Grabb (United States) Patrick McEnroe	3	0^{r}
6	(Switzerland) Jakob Hlasek (Sweden) Anders Järryd	6	0

=== Top half ===
==== Section 1 ====
First round
1	(United States) R Leach (United States) J Pugh	4	6	3
(France) O Delaître (Italy) D Nargiso	6	4	6
(Mexico) L Lavalle (Spain) J Sánchez	7	6
(Italy) P Canè (Venezuela) N Pereira	6	1
(South Africa) B Levine (United States) J Sobel	1	5
(Austria) T Muster (Italy) C Panatta	6	7
(United States) D Rostagno (United States) L Shiras	7	4	4
16	(United States) J Kriek (Denmark) M Mortensen	5	6	6
10	(United States) S Davis (United States) T Wilkison	7	6
(Argentina) E Bengoechea (Argentina) J Frana	6	1
(United States) S Cannon (Australia) M Fancutt	6	4	3
(United States) R Baxter (New Zealand) S Guy	4	6	6
(West Germany) A Mronz (United States) G Van Emburgh	6	6
(United States) D Cassidy (United States) M Purcell	3	2
(United States) M Anger (Netherlands) M Schapers	5	3
8	(United States) J Grabb (United States) P McEnroe	7	6

Second round
(France) O Delaître (Italy) D Nargiso	6	6
(Mexico) L Lavalle (Spain) J Sánchez	3	4
(Austria) T Muster (Italy) C Panatta	6	6	6
16	(United States) J Kriek (Denmark) M Mortensen	7	4	4
10	(United States) S Davis (United States) T Wilkison	6	6
(United States) R Baxter (New Zealand) S Guy	4	3
(West Germany) A Mronz (United States) G Van Emburgh	0	2
8	(United States) J Grabb (United States) P McEnroe	6	6

Third round
(France) O Delaître (Italy) D Nargiso	3	7	6
(Austria) T Muster (Italy) C Panatta	6	6	2
10	(United States) S Davis (United States) T Wilkison	4	2
8	(United States) J Grabb (United States) P McEnroe	6	6

Quarterfinals
(France) O Delaître (Italy) D Nargiso	2	3	3
8	(United States) J Grabb (United States) P McEnroe	6	6	6

==== Section 2 ====
First round
4	(United States) P Annacone (South Africa) C van Rensburg	6	7
(Argentina) J L Clerc (Sweden) M Wilander	3	6
(South Africa) R Deppe (United States) T Siegel	7	7
(The Bahamas) R Smith (Kenya) P Wekesa	6	5
(United States) S Giammalva Jr. (United States) G Layendecker	6	6
(Australia) R Barlow (Australia) P Carter	3	3
(United States) M Flur (Sweden) T Svantesson	4	7	5
14	(United States) T Pawsat (Australia) L Warder	6	5	7
12	(Canada) G Connell (Canada) G Michibata	6	6
(Sweden) P Lundgren (Sweden) M Pernfors	1	3
(France) A Boetsch (France) T Champion	6	7
(United States) J Berger (Argentina) H de la Peña	2	5
(West Germany) C Saceanu (West Germany) C-U Steeb	6	5
(New Zealand) K Evernden (Canada) M Laurendeau	7	7
(United States) S DeVries (United States) R Matuszewski	4	7	6
5	(United States) K Curren (United States) D Pate	6	6	3

Second round
4	(United States) P Annacone (South Africa) C van Rensburg	2	6	6
(South Africa) R Deppe (United States) T Siegel	6	4	4
(United States) S Giammalva Jr. (United States) G Layendecker	6	6
14	(United States) T Pawsat (Australia) L Warder	3	0
12	(Canada) G Connell (Canada) G Michibata	6	6	2
(France) A Boetsch (France) T Champion	3	7	6
(New Zealand) K Evernden (Canada) M Laurendeau	6	2
(United States) S DeVries (United States) R Matuszewski	7	6

Third round
4	(United States) P Annacone (South Africa) C van Rensburg	6	6	5
(United States) S Giammalva Jr. (United States) G Layendecker	3	7	7
(France) A Boetsch (France) T Champion	6	4
(United States) S DeVries (United States) R Matuszewski	7	6

Quarterfinals
(United States) S Giammalva Jr. (United States) G Layendecker	6	4	6	6	6
(United States) S DeVries (United States) R Matuszewski	7	6	3	2	4

=== Bottom half ===
==== Section 3 ====
First round
6	(Switzerland) J Hlasek (Sweden) A Järryd	6	3	6
(Israel) G Bloom (Peru) J Yzaga	3	6	1
(Brazil) C Motta (United States) L Scott	6	5
(United States) S Stewart (United States) B Willenborg	7	7
(Switzerland) C Mezzadri (Australia) K Warwick	4	6
(United States) M De Palmer (United States) B Pearce	6	7
(Sweden) J Gunnarsson (Sweden) M Gustafsson	7	6
11	(United States) M Davis (Australia) B Drewett	6	1
13	(Ecuador) A Gómez (Socialist Federal Republic of Yugoslavia) S Živojinović	3	6	6
(France) J-P Fleurian (Nigeria) N Odizor	6	3	2
(Czechoslovakia) I Lendl (United States) B Scanlon	6	6
(United States) J Arias (United States) G Holmes	2	3
(Soviet Union) A Olhovskiy (Soviet Union) A Volkov	6	2
(United States) J Canter (United States) J Letts	7	6
(South Africa) G Muller (United States) P Sampras	0	2
3	(Spain) S Casal (Spain) E Sánchez	6	6

Second round
6	(Switzerland) J Hlasek (Sweden) A Järryd	7	6
(United States) S Stewart (United States) B Willenborg	6	4
(United States) M De Palmer (United States) B Pearce	5	3
(Sweden) J Gunnarsson (Sweden) M Gustafsson	7	6
13	(Ecuador) A Gómez (Socialist Federal Republic of Yugoslavia) S Živojinović	7	6
(Czechoslovakia) I Lendl (United States) B Scanlon	6	2
(United States) J Canter (United States) J Letts	2	3
3	(Spain) S Casal (Spain) E Sánchez	6	6

Third round
6	(Switzerland) J Hlasek (Sweden) A Järryd	7	6
(Sweden) J Gunnarsson (Sweden) M Gustafsson	6	3
13	(Ecuador) A Gómez (Socialist Federal Republic of Yugoslavia) S Živojinović	6	7
3	(Spain) S Casal (Spain) E Sánchez	3	6

Quarterfinals
6	(Switzerland) J Hlasek (Sweden) A Järryd	5	6	6	6
13	(Ecuador) A Gómez (Socialist Federal Republic of Yugoslavia) S Živojinović	7	3	2	2

==== Section 4 ====
First round
7	(Czechoslovakia) T Šmíd (Australia) M Woodforde	7	6
(Australia) B Dyke (Netherlands) T Nijssen	5	2
(United States) T Mercer (South Africa) B Talbot	6	6
(Italy) O Camporese (Socialist Federal Republic of Yugoslavia) G Ivanišević	7	7
(Spain) F Clavet (Spain) J Clavet	5	7	6
(West Germany) P Baur (West Germany) U Riglewski	7	6	4
(Argentina) A Mancini (Belgium) E Masso	1	7	3
9	(South Africa) P Aldrich (South Africa) D Visser	6	6	6
15	(Australia) D Cahill (Australia) M Kratzmann	6	3	6
(United States) K Jones (United States) J Rive	4	6	3
(Argentina) G Luza (Argentina) G Pérez Roldán	4	4
(Australia) J Stoltenberg (Australia) T Woodbridge	6	6
(Brazil) D Marcelino (Brazil) M Menezes	3	6
(France) G Forget (France) É Winogradsky	6	7
(Australia) B Custer (Australia) D Tyson	4	6
2	(United States) K Flach (United States) R Seguso	6	7

Second round
7	(Czechoslovakia) T Šmíd (Australia) M Woodforde	6	6
(Italy) O Camporese (Socialist Federal Republic of Yugoslavia) G Ivanišević	1	2
(Spain) F Clavet (Spain) J Clavet	0	4
9	(South Africa) P Aldrich (South Africa) D Visser	6	6
15	(Australia) D Cahill (Australia) M Kratzmann	6	3	7
(Australia) J Stoltenberg (Australia) T Woodbridge	4	6	6
(France) G Forget (France) É Winogradsky	4	6	7
2	(United States) K Flach (United States) R Seguso	6	4	5

Third round
7	(Czechoslovakia) T Šmíd (Australia) M Woodforde	6	3	0
9	(South Africa) P Aldrich (South Africa) D Visser	2	6	6
15	(Australia) D Cahill (Australia) M Kratzmann	6	6
(France) G Forget (France) É Winogradsky	3	2

Quarterfinals
9	(South Africa) P Aldrich (South Africa) D Visser	6	6	6
15	(Australia) D Cahill (Australia) M Kratzmann	3	4	2
