= 1988 Benson and Hedges Open – Singles =

Singles
- 1988 Benson and Hedges Open

Final
- Champion: (Israel) Amos Mansdorf
- Runner-up: (India) Ramesh Krishnan
- Score: 6–3, 6–4

Details
- Draw: 32 (4 Q / 3 WC )
- Seeds: 8

Events
Singles	Doubles
← 1987 ·	ATP Auckland Open	· 1989 →

Amos Mansdorf defeated Ramesh Krishnan 6–3, 6–4 to win the 1988 Benson and Hedges Open singles competition. Miloslav Mečíř was the champion but did not defend his title.

== Seeds ==
A champion seed is indicated in bold text while text in italics indicates the round in which that seed was eliminated.

1. (Sweden) Peter Lundgren (quarterfinals)
2. (Israel) **Amos Mansdorf (champion)**
3. (Sweden) Jonas Svensson (second round)
4. (West Germany) Carl-Uwe Steeb (first round)
5. (Australia) John Frawley (quarterfinals)
6. (United States) Jim Pugh (semifinals)
7. (Netherlands) Michiel Schapers (second round)
8. (United States) Dan Goldie (quarterfinals)

== Draw ==
=== Key ===
- Q – Qualifier
- WC – Wild card

First round
1	(Sweden) **P Lundgren**	**6**	**6**
(United States) D Cassidy	3	4
(Italy) P Canè	3	1
Q	(United States) **T Witsken**	**6**	**6**
(India) **R Krishnan**	**6**	**6**
(France) T Benhabiles	0	4
(Italy) C Pistolesi	3	2
7	(Netherlands) **M Schapers**	**6**	**6**
4	(West Germany) C Steeb	2	6
(United States) **J Grabb**	**6**	**7**
WC	(New Zealand) **D Lewis**	1	**6**	**7**
(West Germany) C Saceanu	**6**	4	5
(Sweden) M Gustafsson	2	2
(Sweden) **C Bergström**	**6**	**6**
(Australia) M Woodforde	**6**	3	6
6	(United States) **J Pugh**	4	**6**	**8**
5	(Australia) **J Frawley**	**6**	**6**
WC	(New Zealand) B Derlin	3	3
(Canada) **G Connell**	**7**	**6**
Q	(Italy) O Camporese	5	4
(Australia) **B Dyke**	**6**	**6**
WC	(New Zealand) B Steven	3	4
(United States) T Wilkison	2	0
3	(Sweden) **J Svensson**	**6**	**6**
8	(United States) **D Goldie**	**6**	**6**
Q	(West Germany) A Mronz	4	1
(West Germany) D Keretić	**6**	2	3
(United States) **M Davis**	3	**6**	**6**
(United Kingdom) **J Bates**	**6**	**6**
(United States) B Scanlon	3	3
Q	(Japan) S Matsuoka	3	2
2	(Israel) **A Mansdorf**	**6**	**6**

Second round
1	(Sweden) **P Lundgren**	**6**	6	**6**
Q	(United States) T Witsken	3	**7**	3
(India) **R Krishnan**	**7**	**6**
7	(Netherlands) M Schapers	5	3
(United States) **J Grabb**	3	**6**	**6**
WC	(New Zealand) D Lewis	**6**	3	0
(Sweden) C Bergström	**6**	3	8
6	(United States) **J Pugh**	2	**6**	**10**
5	(Australia) **J Frawley**	0	**6**	**6**
(Canada) G Connell	**6**	4	1
(Australia) **B Dyke**	**6**	1	**8**
3	(Sweden) J Svensson	4	**6**	6
8	(United States) **D Goldie**	5	**6**	**6**
(United States) M Davis	**7**	4	4
(United Kingdom) J Bates	**6**	6	1
2	(Israel) **A Mansdorf**	4	**7**	**6**

Quarterfinals
1	(Sweden) P Lundgren	3	1
(India) **R Krishnan**	**6**	**6**
(United States) J Grabb	3	**6**	6
6	(United States) **J Pugh**	**6**	2	**8**
5	(Australia) J Frawley	6	2
(Australia) **B Dyke**	**7**	**6**
8	(United States) D Goldie	1	4
2	(Israel) **A Mansdorf**	**6**	**6**

Semifinals
(India) **R Krishnan**	**6**	**6**
6	(United States) J Pugh	2	2
(Australia) B Dyke	3	4
2	(Israel) **A Mansdorf**	**6**	**6**

Final
(India) Ramesh Krishnan	3	4
2	(Israel) **Amos Mansdorf**	**6**	**6**
