= 1992 Benson and Hedges Open =

- Date: 6–13 January
- Edition: 25th
- Category: World Series
- Draw: 32S / 16D
- Prize money: $157,500
- Surface: Hard / outdoor
- Location: Auckland, New Zealand

Champions

Singles
- (Peru) Jaime Yzaga

Doubles
- (South Africa) Wayne Ferreira / (United States) Jim Grabb
← 1991 ·	ATP Auckland Open	· 1993 →

The 1992 Benson and Hedges Open was a men's ATP men's tennis tournament held in Auckland, New Zealand and played on outdoor hard courts. It was part of the World Series of the 1992 ATP Tour. It was the 25th edition of the tournament and was held from 6 January through 13 January 1992. Unseeded Jaime Yzaga won the singles title.

== Finals ==
=== Singles ===
(Peru) Jaime Yzaga defeated (United States) MaliVai Washington 7–6^{(8–6)}, 6–4

- It was Yzaga's 1st title of the year and the 5th of his career.

=== Doubles ===
(South Africa) Wayne Ferreira / (United States) Jim Grabb defeated (Canada) Grant Connell / (Canada) Glenn Michibata 6–4, 6–3

- It was Ferreira's 1st title of the year and the 3rd of his career. It was Grabb's 1st title of the year and the 9th of his career.
