= 1989 Benson and Hedges Open – Doubles =

Doubles
- 1989 Benson and Hedges Open

Final
- Champions: (New Zealand) Steve Guy (Japan) Shuzo Matsuoka
- Runners-up: (United States) John Letts (United States) Bruce Man-Son-Hing
- Score: 7–6, 7–6

Details
- Draw: 16
- Seeds: 4

Events
Singles	Doubles
- ATP Auckland Open

Martin Davis and Tim Pawsat were the defending champions, but Davis chose to compete at Sydney in the same week. Pawsat teamed up with Tobias Svantesson and lost in the first round to Luke Jensen and Richey Reneberg.

Steve Guy and Shuzo Matsuoka won the title by defeating John Letts and Bruce Man-Son-Hing 7–6, 7–6 in the final.

== Seeds ==
1. (Canada) Grant Connell / (Canada) Glenn Michibata (semifinals)
2. (Australia) Broderick Dyke / (New Zealand) Kelly Evernden (quarterfinals)
3. (West Germany) Patrick Baur / (West Germany) Udo Riglewski (first round)
4. (United States) Tim Pawsat / (Sweden) Tobias Svantesson (first round)

== Draw ==
Key

- Q = Qualifier
- WC = Wild card
- LL = Lucky loser
- Alt = Alternate
- ITF = ITF entry
- PR = Protected ranking
- SR = Special ranking
- SE = Special exempt
- JE = Junior exempt
- JR = Junior Accelerator Programme entrant
- CO = College Accelerator Programme entrant
- NG = Next Gen Accelerator Program entrant
- w/o = Walkover
- r = Retired
- d = Defaulted

=== Draw ===
First round
1	(Canada) G Connell (Canada) G Michibata	6	6	6
(Argentina) H de la Peña (India) R Krishnan	4	7	3
(United States) P Chamberlin (Brazil) D Marcelino	3	6	5
(New Zealand) Jeremy Grubi (New Zealand) Andrew Lobb	6	3	7
3	(West Germany) P Baur (West Germany) U Riglewski	6	1	5
(Japan) H Shirato (Japan) E Takeuchi	4	6	7
(United States) J Letts (United States) B Man-Son-Hing	7	6
(United States) M Kures (Italy) G Pozzi	6	1
(The Bahamas) R Smith (Kenya) P Wekesa	7	7
(United States) R Matuszewski (United States) F Viancos	6	6
(United States) L Jensen (United States) R Reneberg	6	3	6
4	(United States) T Pawsat (Sweden) T Svantesson	2	6	2
(New Zealand) S Guy (Japan) S Matsuoka	6	6
(West Germany) M Westphal (United States) P Wright	4	2
(United States) J Barham (United States) J Klaparda	6	1	4
2	(Australia) B Dyke (New Zealand) K Evernden	3	6	6

Quarterfinals
1	(Canada) G Connell (Canada) G Michibata	6	6
(New Zealand) Jeremy Grubi (New Zealand) Andrew Lobb	3	2
(Japan) H Shirato (Japan) E Takeuchi	1	2
(United States) J Letts (United States) B Man-Son-Hing	6	6
(The Bahamas) R Smith (Kenya) P Wekesa	7	5	13
(United States) L Jensen (United States) R Reneberg	5	7	15
(New Zealand) S Guy (Japan) S Matsuoka	7	3	6
2	(Australia) B Dyke (New Zealand) K Evernden	5	6	3

Semifinals
1	(Canada) G Connell (Canada) G Michibata	7	4	4
(United States) J Letts (United States) B Man-Son-Hing	5	6	6
(United States) L Jensen (United States) R Reneberg	5	5
(New Zealand) S Guy (Japan) S Matsuoka	7	7

Final
(United States) J Letts (United States) B Man-Son-Hing	6	6
(New Zealand) S Guy (Japan) S Matsuoka	7	7
