= 1989 Lipton International Players Championships =

- Date: March 20 – April 3
- Edition: 5th
- Surface: Hard / outdoor
- Location: Key Biscayne, Florida, U.S.
- Venue: Tennis Center at Crandon Park

Champions

Men's singles
- (Czechoslovakia) Ivan Lendl

Women's singles
- (Argentina) Gabriela Sabatini

Men's doubles
- (Switzerland) Jakob Hlasek / (Sweden) Anders Järryd

Women's doubles
- (Czechoslovakia) Jana Novotná / (Czechoslovakia) Helena Suková
- Miami Open

The 1989 Lipton International Players Championships was a tennis tournament played on outdoor hard courts. It was the 5th edition of the Miami Masters and was part of the 1989 Nabisco Grand Prix and of Category 5 of the 1989 WTA Tour. The tournament took place at the Tennis Center at Crandon Park in Key Biscayne, Florida in the United States from March 20 through April 3, 1989.

== Finals ==
=== Men's singles ===
(Czechoslovakia) Ivan Lendl defeated (Austria) Thomas Muster by walkover

- It was Lendl's 3rd title of the year and the 82nd of his career.
- Muster could not play the final because he was hit by a drunk driver on the eve of the final.

=== Women's singles ===
(Argentina) Gabriela Sabatini defeated (United States) Chris Evert 6–1, 4–6, 6–2

- It was Sabatini's 1st title of the year and the 19th of her career.

=== Men's doubles ===
(Switzerland) Jakob Hlasek / (Sweden) Anders Järryd defeated (United States) Jim Grabb / (United States) Patrick McEnroe 6–3 (Grabb and McEnroe retired)

- It was Hlasek's 3rd title of the year and the 9th of his career. It was Järryd's 1st title of the year and the 43rd of his career.

=== Women's doubles ===
(Czechoslovakia) Jana Novotná / (Czechoslovakia) Helena Suková defeated (United States) Gigi Fernández / (United States) Lori McNeil 7–6^{(7–5)}, 6–4

- It was Novotná's 4th title of the year and the 16th of her career. It was Suková's 4th title of the year and the 36th of her career.
