= 1987 Benson and Hedges Open =

- Date: 5–11 January
- Edition: 20th
- Category: Grand Prix
- Draw: 32S / 16D
- Prize money: $89,400
- Surface: Hard / outdoor
- Location: Auckland, New Zealand

Champions

Singles
- (Czechoslovakia) Miloslav Mečíř

Doubles
- (United States) Kelly Jones / (United States) Brad Pearce
- ATP Auckland Open

The 1987 Benson and Hedges Open was a men's Grand Prix tennis tournament played on outdoor hard courts in Auckland, New Zealand. It was the 20th edition of the tournament and was held from 5 January to 11 January 1987. First-seeded Miloslav Mečíř won the singles title.

== Finals ==
=== Singles ===
(Czechoslovakia) Miloslav Mečíř defeated (Netherlands) Michiel Schapers 6–2, 6–3, 6–4

- It was Mečíř's 1st title of the year and the 6th of his career.

=== Doubles ===
(United States) Kelly Jones / (United States) Brad Pearce defeated (Australia) Carl Limberger / (Australia) Mark Woodforde 7–6, 7–6

- It was Jones's only title of the year and the 1st of his career. It was Pearce's only title of the year and the 2nd of his career.
