= 1989 Lipton International Players Championships – Women's singles =

Women's singles
- 1989 Lipton International Players Championships
- 1988 Champion: (West Germany) Steffi Graf

Final
- Champion: (Argentina) Gabriela Sabatini
- Runner-up: (United States) Chris Evert
- Score: 6–1, 4–6, 6–2

Events
Singles	men	women
Doubles	men	women
← 1988 ·	Lipton International Players Championships	· 1990 →

Steffi Graf was the defending champion but did not compete that year.

The final was won by Gabriela Sabatini 6–2, 4–6, 6–1 against Chris Evert.

== Seeds ==
A champion seed is indicated in bold text while text in italics indicates the round in which that seed was eliminated.

1. (Argentina) **Gabriela Sabatini (champion)**
2. (United States) Chris Evert (final)
3. (Czechoslovakia) Helena Suková (semifinals)
4. (United States) Pam Shriver (fourth round)
5. (United States) Zina Garrison (semifinals)
6. (Bulgaria) Manuela Maleeva (third round)
7. n/a
8. (Bulgaria) Katerina Maleeva (fourth round)
9. (United States) Mary Joe Fernández (fourth round)
10. (United States) Lori McNeil (fourth round)
11. (Canada) Helen Kelesi (quarterfinals)
12. (Spain) Arantxa Sánchez (third round)
13. (West Germany) Sylvia Hanika (second round)
14. (Sweden) Catarina Lindqvist (second round)
15. (Italy) Raffaella Reggi (quarterfinals)
16. (United States) Susan Sloane (second round)
17. (Argentina) Bettina Fulco (third round)
18. (Australia) Nicole Provis (first round)
19. (Australia) Anne Minter (first round)
20. (France) Nathalie Tauziat (third round)
21. (Austria) Barbara Paulus (third round)
22. (Czechoslovakia) Radka Zrubáková (second round)
23. (New Zealand) Belinda Cordwell (third round)
24. (United States) Amy Frazier (second round)
25. (France) Isabelle Demongeot (quarterfinals)
26. (United States) Terry Phelps (first round)
27. (Netherlands) Brenda Schultz (first round)
28. (South Africa) Rosalyn Fairbank (second round)
29. (South Africa) Elna Reinach (second round)
30. (United States) Gretchen Magers (fourth round)
31. (Brazil) Neige Dias (first round)
32. (Argentina) Patricia Tarabini (first round)

== Draw ==
=== Key ===
- Q = Qualifier
- WC = Wild card
- LL = Lucky loser
- Alt = Alternate
- SE = Special exempt
- PR = Protected ranking
- ITF = ITF entry
- JE = Junior exempt
- w/o = Walkover
- r = Retired
- d = Defaulted
- SR = Special ranking

=== Finals ===
Quarterfinals
1	(Argentina) Gabriela Sabatini	6	7
25	(France) Isabelle Demongeot	1	5
3	(Czechoslovakia) Helena Suková	5	6	6
15	(Italy) Raffaella Reggi	7	4	3
5	(United States) Zina Garrison	6	5	6
(Czechoslovakia) Jana Novotná	4	7	1
11	(Canada) Helen Kelesi	3	6	6
2	(United States) Chris Evert	6	4	7

Semifinals
1	(Argentina) Gabriela Sabatini	6	6	6
3	(Czechoslovakia) Helena Suková	7	3	4
5	(United States) Zina Garrison	3	1
2	(United States) Chris Evert	6	6

Final
1	(Argentina) Gabriela Sabatini	6	4	6
2	(United States) Chris Evert	1	6	2

=== Top half ===
==== Section 1 ====
First round
1	(Argentina) G Sabatini	6	6
(United States) E Hakami	0	3
(Italy) L Ferrando	4	6	3
(France) C Suire	6	1	6
(United Kingdom) S Gomer	6	6
(United States) K Adams	4	2
Q	(United States) L Harvey-Wild	3	3
23	(New Zealand) B Cordwell	6	6
28	(South Africa) R Fairbank	6	5	6
Q	(United States) C MacGregor	4	7	3
(Argentina) M Paz	2	6	3
(United States) A Grossman	6	4	6
(Australia) E Smylie	2	2
(United States) H Cioffi	6	6
(Czechoslovakia) J Pospíšilová	3	1
13	(West Germany) S Hanika	6	6

Second round
1	(Argentina) G Sabatini	6	6
(France) C Suire	0	0
(United Kingdom) S Gomer	4	4
23	(New Zealand) B Cordwell	6	6
28	(South Africa) R Fairbank	7	5	4
(United States) A Grossman	6	7	6
(United States) H Cioffi	4	6	6
13	(West Germany) S Hanika	6	4	1

Third round
1	(Argentina) G Sabatini	6	6
23	(New Zealand) B Cordwell	2	1
(United States) A Grossman	6	6
(United States) H Cioffi	3	1

Fourth round
1	(Argentina) G Sabatini	6	7
(United States) A Grossman	4	6

==== Section 2 ====
First round
13	(Spain) A Sánchez	6	6
(Australia) J-A Faull	3	4
(France) A Dechaume	0	6
(United States) L Allen	6	7
(United States) H Na	6	6	2
(France) J Halard	2	7	6
(Czechoslovakia) P Langrová	6	2
30	(United States) G Magers	7	6
25	(France) I Demongeot	6	6	6
(United States) P Louie-Harper	7	0	2
(United Kingdom) M Javer	4	0
(United States) B Nagelsen	6	6
(United States) R White	5	6	1
(United States) G Fernández	7	3	6
(Australia) J Byrne	1	3
6	(Bulgaria) M Maleeva	6	6

Second round
12	(Spain) A Sánchez Vicario	6	6
(United States) L Allen	0	2
(France) J Halard	3	1
30	(United States) G Magers	6	6
25	(France) I Demongeot	6	6
(United States) B Nagelsen	1	4
(United States) G Fernández	2	2
6	(Bulgaria) M Maleeva	6	6

Third round
12	(Spain) A Sánchez	5	3
30	(United States) G Magers	7	6
25	(France) I Demongeot	6	6
6	(Bulgaria) M Maleeva	3	2

Fourth round
30	(United States) G Magers	5	3
25	(France) I Demongeot	7	6

==== Section 3 ====
First round
3	(Czechoslovakia) H Suková	6	6
Q	(France) S Amiach	1	1
(United States) L Antonoplis	4	6	6
(United Kingdom) C Wood	6	4	2
(Australia) W Turnbull	r
(Italy) L Garrone
(United States) L Bonder-Kreiss	3	1
21	(Austria) B Paulus	6	6
32	(Argentina) P Tarabini	3	0
(Switzerland) C Cohen	6	6
(Denmark) T Scheuer-Larsen	6	5	6
(United States) A Ivan	2	7	3
Q	(France) M-C Calleja	2	6	6
(United States) C Christian	6	1	3
(Netherlands) M Bollegraf	4	3
10	(United States) L McNeil	6	6

Second round
3	(Czechoslovakia) H Suková	6	6
(United States) L Antonoplis	3	4
(Italy) L Garrone	4	1
21	(Austria) B Paulus	6	6
(Switzerland) C Cohen	4	1
(Denmark) T Scheuer-Larsen	6	6
Q	(France) M-C Calleja	1	0
10	(United States) L McNeil	6	6

Third round
3	(Czechoslovakia) H Suková	6	6
21	(Austria) B Paulus	1	2
(Denmark) T Scheuer-Larsen	4	7	4
10	(United States) L McNeil	6	5	6

Fourth round
3	(Czechoslovakia) H Suková	6	6
10	(United States) L McNeil	3	2

==== Section 4 ====
First round
15	(Italy) R Reggi	6	6
(Netherlands) H Witvoet	1	3
(Switzerland) E Krapl	4	3
(Czechoslovakia) A Holíková	6	6
(United States) H Ludloff	1	1
(Canada) J Hetherington	6	6
(United States) K Steinmetz	2	4
17	(Argentina) B Fulco	6	6
19	(Australia) A Minter	1	3
Q	(Canada) M Drake	6	6
(United States) K Horvath	6	5
(West Germany) E Pfaff	7	7
(United Kingdom) J Durie	2	2
Q	(Japan) A Nishiya	6	6
Q	(South Africa) L Barnard	6	6
LL	(West Germany) S Hack	3	3

Second round
15	(Italy) R Reggi	6	6
(Czechoslovakia) A Holíková	4	1
(Canada) J Hetherington	5	4
17	(Argentina) B Fulco	7	6
Q	(Canada) M Drake	4	4
(West Germany) E Pfaff	6	6
Q	(Japan) A Nishiya	6	7
Q	(South Africa) L Barnard	2	6

Third round
15	(Italy) R Reggi	6	6
17	(Argentina) B Fulco	3	2
(West Germany) E Pfaff	6	6
Q	(Japan) A Nishiya	3	4

Fourth round
15	(Italy) R Reggi	6	6
(West Germany) E Pfaff	3	3

=== Bottom half ===
==== Section 5 ====
First round
5	(United States) Z Garrison	6	6
(United States) J Santrock	4	0
(Sweden) M Strandlund	7	6
(United States) A Henricksson	6	4
(West Germany) W Probst	6	1	2
(Peru) L Gildemeister	4	6	6
(United States) R Reis	6	7
31	(Brazil) N Dias	2	5
26	(United States) T Phelps	1	6	2
(United States) M Van Nostrand	6	1	6
(West Germany) M Pawlik	2	3
(Italy) L Golarsa	6	6
(United States) C Cunningham	3	1
(United States) B Herr	6	6
(West Germany) S Frankl	1	1
14	(Sweden) C Lindqvist	6	6

Second round
5	(United States) Z Garrison	6	6
(Sweden) M Strandlund	2	1
(Peru) L Gildemeister	6	6
(United States) R Reis	4	2
(United States) M Van Nostrand	6	4	0
(Italy) L Golarsa	2	6	6
(United States) B Herr	6	6	6
14	(Sweden) C Lindqvist	7	4	3

Third round
5	(United States) Z Garrison	6	6
(Peru) L Gildemeister	2	1
(Italy) L Golarsa	6	5	7
(United States) B Herr	0	7	6

Fourth round
5	(United States) Z Garrison	6	6
(Italy) L Golarsa	1	2

==== Section 6 ====
First round
16	(United States) S Sloane	6	6
(United States) M L Daniels	4	2
(Czechoslovakia) I Budařová	1	1
(Czechoslovakia) J Novotná	6	6
(South Africa) D Van Rensburg	7	6
(United States) K Gompert	5	3
(Italy) L Lapi	6	6
18	(Australia) N Provis	3	0
24	(United States) A Frazier	6	6
Q	(West Germany) S Auer	2	2
(South Africa) A Coetzer	6	6
(United States) M Torres	2	2
(United States) C Benjamin	5	6
(United States) S Stafford	7	7
(Japan) E Inoue	7	5	3
4	(United States) P Shriver	5	7	6

Second round
16	(United States) S Sloane	6	6	1
(Czechoslovakia) J Novotná	4	7	6
(South Africa) D Van Rensburg	6	6
(Italy) L Lapi	3	1
24	(United States) A Frazier	3	4
(South Africa) A Coetzer	6	6
(United States) S Stafford	4	3
4	(United States) P Shriver	6	6

Third round
(Czechoslovakia) J Novotná	6	6
(South Africa) D Van Rensburg	2	1
(South Africa) A Coetzer	5	2
4	(United States) P Shriver	7	6

Fourth round
(Czechoslovakia) J Novotná	7	6
4	(United States) P Shriver	5	4

==== Section 7 ====
First round
8	(Bulgaria) K Maleeva	7	1	7
(France) N Herreman	6	6	5
(United States) S Martin	4	4
(Poland) I Kuczyńska	6	6
(South Africa) K Schimper	6	6
LL	(Sweden) M Lindström	3	4
(France) N Guerrée	6	3	4
29	(South Africa) E Reinach	4	6	6
22	(Czechoslovakia) R Zrubáková	6	6
(Belgium) A Devries	1	2
(United States) M Werdel	5	0
(West Germany) C Porwik	7	6
(Italy) F Bonsignori	3	3
(United States) M McGrath	6	6
(West Germany) S Meier	3	6
11	(Canada) H Kelesi	6	7

Second round
8	(Bulgaria) K Maleeva	6	7
(Poland) I Kuczyńska	3	5
(South Africa) K Schimper	7	1	6
29	(South Africa) E Reinach	6	6	4
22	(Czechoslovakia) R Zrubáková	0	2
(West Germany) C Porwik	6	6
(United States) M McGrath	6	4	1
11	(Canada) H Kelesi	1	6	6

Third round
8	(Bulgaria) K Maleeva	6	6
(South Africa) K Schimper	3	4
(West Germany) C Porwik	6	4	5
11	(Canada) H Kelesi	1	6	7

Fourth round
8	(Bulgaria) K Maleeva	2	3
11	(Canada) H Kelesi	6	6

==== Section 8 ====
First round
9	(United States) M J Fernández	6	6
(Netherlands) N Jagerman	3	2
(Italy) C Caverzasio	6	6
(Argentina) A Villagrán	2	4
(United States) D Faber	2	4
(Belgium) S Wasserman	6	6
(United States) B Bowes	6	7
27	(Netherlands) B Schultz	1	6
20	(France) N Tauziat	6	7
(Canada) C Bassett-Seguso	1	6
(United States) W White	6	3	7
(Japan) N Miyagi	4	6	5
(United States) K Rinaldi	6	6
(Australia) D Balestrat	4	2
(Socialist Federal Republic of Yugoslavia) S Goleš	3	4
2	(United States) C Evert	6	6

Second round
9	(United States) M J Fernández	6	7
(Italy) C Caverzasio	2	5
(Belgium) S Wasserman	2	3
(United States) B Bowes	6	6
20	(France) N Tauziat	7	4	6
(United States) W White	6	6	3
(United States) K Rinaldi	6	4
2	(United States) C Evert	7	6

Third round
9	(United States) M J Fernández	6	6
(United States) B Bowes	1	3
20	(France) N Tauziat	3	3
2	(United States) C Evert	6	6

Fourth round
9	(United States) M J Fernández	5	2
2	(United States) C Evert	7	6
