= 1990 Benson and Hedges Open – Singles =

Singles
- 1990 Benson and Hedges Open

Final
- Champion: (United States) Scott Davis
- Runner-up: (Soviet Union) Andrei Chesnokov
- Score: 4–6, 6–3, 6–3

Details
- Draw: 32 (4 Q / 3 WC )
- Seeds: 8

Events
| Singles | Doubles |
| ← 1989 · | ATP Auckland Open | · 1991 → |

Ramesh Krishnan was the defending champion but lost in the semifinals to Scott Davis.

Davis won the 1990 Benson & Hedges Open tennis tournament, defeating Andrei Chesnokov in the final 4–6, 6–3, 6–3.

== Seeds ==
A champion seed is indicated in bold text while text in italics indicates the round in which that seed was eliminated.

1. (Soviet Union) Andrei Chesnokov (final)
2. (Czechoslovakia) Miloslav Mečíř (first round)
3. (Sweden) Magnus Gustafsson (quarterfinals)
4. (New Zealand) Kelly Evernden (first round)
5. (Israel) Amos Mansdorf (semifinals)
6. (Italy) Paolo Canè (first round)
7. (United States) Paul Chamberlin (first round)
8. (United States) **Scott Davis (champion)**

== Draw ==
=== Key ===
- Q = Qualifier
- WC = Wild card
- LL = Lucky loser
- Alt = Alternate
- SE = Special exempt
- PR = Protected ranking
- ITF = ITF entry
- JE = Junior exempt
- w/o = Walkover
- r = Retired
- d = Defaulted
- SR = Special ranking

First round
1 | (Soviet Union) **A Chesnokov** | **7^{7}** | 6^{4} | **7**
Q | (West Germany) M Zoecke | 6^{5} | **7^{7}** | 5
(United States) **R Reneberg** | **6** | **6**
(Israel) G Bloom | 3 | 2
(West Germany) **M Stich** | **7** | **6**
Q | (United States) K Jones | 5 | 3
(Canada) **G Connell** | **7** | **6**
7 | (United States) P Chamberlin | 5 | 3
4 | (New Zealand) K Evernden | 2 | 4
(United States) **G Layendecker** | **6** | **6**
(Italy) C Pistolesi | 3 | 3
(United States) **J Arias** | **6** | **6**
(France) **O Delaître** | **6** | **6**
(Netherlands) P Haarhuis | 2 | 3
(Czechoslovakia) K Nováček | 4 | 1
5 | (Israel) **A Mansdorf** | **6** | **6**
6 | (Italy) P Canè | 1 | 1
(India) **R Krishnan** | **6** | **6**
WC | (New Zealand) **B Derlin** | **7** | **6**
(Canada) M Laurendeau | 5 | 2
(West Germany) J Wöhrmann | **6** | 1 | 1
(United Kingdom) **J Bates** | 2 | **6** | **6**
(Australia) J Anderson | 1 | 2
3 | (Sweden) **M Gustafsson** | **6** | **6**
8 | (United States) **S Davis** | 1 | **6** | **6**
Q | (Sweden) C Bergström | **6** | 4 | 2
(United States) **D Goldie** | **7^{7}** | **6**
(Sweden) L-A Wahlgren | 6^{4} | 0
Q | (Finland) V Paloheimo | 3 | 0
WC | (New Zealand) **B Steven** | **6** | **6**
WC | (New Zealand) **S Guy** | **6** | **6**
2 | (Czechoslovakia) M Mečíř | 3 | 3

Second round
1 | (Soviet Union) **A Chesnokov** | **6** | **6**
(United States) R Reneberg | 4 | 4
(West Germany) M Stich | 4 | **7^{7}** | 2
(Canada) **G Connell** | **6** | 6^{2} | **6**
(United States) G Layendecker | **6** | 2 | 2
(United States) **J Arias** | 2 | **6** | **6**
(France) O Delaître | 2 | 5
5 | (Israel) **A Mansdorf** | **6** | **7**
(India) **R Krishnan** | **7^{9}** | **7**
WC | (New Zealand) B Derlin | 6^{7} | 5
(United Kingdom) J Bates | 2 | 0
3 | (Sweden) **M Gustafsson** | **6** | **6**
8 | (United States) **S Davis** | **6** | 6^{9} | **6**
(United States) D Goldie | 1 | **7^{11}** | 2
WC | (New Zealand) B Steven | 3 | **7^{7}** | 4
WC | (New Zealand) **S Guy** | **6** | 6^{4} | **6**

Quarterfinals
1 | (Soviet Union) **A Chesnokov** | 2 | **6** | **6**
(Canada) G Connell | **6** | 4 | 3
(United States) J Arias | 3 | 6^{3}
5 | (Israel) **A Mansdorf** | **6** | **7^{7}**
(India) **R Krishnan** | **7^{7}** | **6**
3 | (Sweden) M Gustafsson | 6^{5} | 2
8 | (United States) **S Davis** | **6** | **7^{7}**
WC | (New Zealand) S Guy | 2 | 6^{0}

Semifinals
1 | (Soviet Union) **A Chesnokov** | **7^{7}** | **6**
5 | (Israel) A Mansdorf | 6^{3} | 2
(India) R Krishnan | **7** | 3 | 4
8 | (United States) **S Davis** | 5 | **6** | **6**

Final
1 | (Soviet Union) Andrei Chesnokov | **6** | 3 | 3
8 | (United States) **Scott Davis** | 4 | **6** | **6**
