= 1989 Lipton International Players Championships – Women's doubles =

Women's doubles
- 1989 Lipton International Players Championships
- 1988 Champions: (West Germany) Steffi Graf; (Argentina) Gabriela Sabatini

Final
- Champions: (Czechoslovakia) Jana Novotná; (Czechoslovakia) Helena Suková
- Runners-up: (United States) Gigi Fernández; (United States) Lori McNeil
- Score: 7–6 (7–5), 6–4

Events
Singles	men	women
Doubles	men	women
← 1988 ·	Lipton International Players Championships	· 1990 →

Steffi Graf and Gabriela Sabatini were the defending champions but only Sabatini competed that year with Betsy Nagelsen.

Nagelsen and Sabatini lost in the quarterfinals to Katrina Adams and Zina Garrison.

Jana Novotná and Helena Suková won in the final 7–6 (7–5), 6–4 against Gigi Fernández and Lori McNeil.

== Seeds ==
Champion seeds are indicated in bold text while text in italics indicates the round in which those seeds were eliminated.

1. (United States) Betsy Nagelsen / (Argentina) Gabriela Sabatini (quarterfinals)
2. (Czechoslovakia) **Jana Novotná** / (Czechoslovakia) **Helena Suková (champions)**
3. (United States) Gigi Fernández / (United States) Lori McNeil (final)
4. (United States) Elise Burgin / (United States) Pam Shriver (third round)
5. (United States) Katrina Adams / (United States) Zina Garrison (semifinals)
6. n/a
7. (France) Isabelle Demongeot / (France) Nathalie Tauziat (quarterfinals)
8. (Australia) Jenny Byrne / (United States) Robin White (third round)
9. (Netherlands) Manon Bollegraf / (West Germany) Eva Pfaff (semifinals)
10. (United States) Beth Herr / (United States) Candy Reynolds (first round)
11. (United States) Terry Phelps / (Italy) Raffaella Reggi (third round)
12. (Argentina) Mercedes Paz / (Denmark) Tine Scheuer-Larsen (first round)
13. (United States) Penny Barg / (United States) Ronni Reis (second round)
14. (United Kingdom) Jo Durie / (United States) Mary Joe Fernández (quarterfinals)
15. (New Zealand) Belinda Cordwell / (South Africa) Dianne Van Rensburg (third round)
16. (Australia) Nicole Provis / (South Africa) Elna Reinach (second round)

== Draw ==
=== Key ===
- Q = Qualifier
- WC = Wild card
- LL = Lucky loser
- Alt = Alternate
- SE = Special exempt
- PR = Protected ranking
- ITF = ITF entry
- JE = Junior exempt
- w/o = Walkover
- r = Retired
- d = Defaulted
- SR = Special ranking

=== Finals ===
Semifinals

Final

5
- (United States) Katrina Adams
- (United States) Zina Garrison
3
6

3
- (United States) **Gigi Fernández**
- (United States) **Lori McNeil**
**6**
**7**

3
- (United States) Gigi Fernández
- (United States) Lori McNeil
6^{5}
4

2
- (Czechoslovakia) **Jana Novotná**
- (Czechoslovakia) **Helena Suková**
**7^{7}**
**6**

9
- (Netherlands) Manon Bollegraf
- (West Germany) Eva Pfaff
3
2

2
- (Czechoslovakia) **Jana Novotná**
- (Czechoslovakia) **Helena Suková**
**6**
**6**

=== Top half ===
==== Section 1 ====
First round

Second round

Third round

Quarterfinals

1
- (United States) **B Nagelsen**
- (Argentina) **G Sabatini**
**6**
**6**

- (United States) Ca MacGregor
- (United States) Cy MacGregor
2
1

1
- (United States) **B Nagelsen**
- (Argentina) **G Sabatini**
**6**
**6**

- (France) **S Amiach**
- (United States) **J Thomas**
**7**
**6**

- (France) S Amiach
- (United States) J Thomas
4
3

- (United States) A Ivan
- (Japan) S Okada
5
0

1
- (United States) **B Nagelsen**
- (Argentina) **G Sabatini**
**6**
0
**6**

- (France) J Halard
- (France) M Laval
6
2

- (United States) M L Daniels
- (United States) P Louie-Harper
1
**6**
3

- (United States) **M L Daniels**
- (United States) **P Louie-Harper**
**7**
**6**

- (United States) **M L Daniels**
- (United States) **P Louie-Harper**
**6**
4
**6**

- (United States) A Henricksson
- (Poland) I Kuczyńska
4
4

13
- (United States) P Barg
- (United States) R Reis
2
**6**
4

13
- (United States) **P Barg**
- (United States) **R Reis**
**6**
**6**

1
- (United States) B Nagelsen
- (Argentina) G Sabatini
0
4

10
- (United States) B Herr
- (United States) C Reynolds
4
**7**
5

5
- (United States) **K Adams**
- (United States) **Z Garrison**
**6**
**6**

- (South Africa) **L Barnard**
- (South Africa) **L Gregory**
**6**
6
**7**

- (South Africa) **L Barnard**
- (South Africa) **L Gregory**
**6**
3
**6**

- (United States) A Grousbeck
- (Austria) H Sprung
6
1

- (Australia) J-A Faull
- (Spain) A Sánchez
4
**6**
3

- (Australia) **J-A Faull**
- (Spain) **A Sánchez**
**7**
**6**

- (South Africa) L Barnard
- (South Africa) L Gregory
**6**
3
1

- (Brazil) P Medrado
- (Brazil) A Vieira
0
1

5
- (United States) **K Adams**
- (United States) **Z Garrison**
4
**6**
**6**

- (United States) **K Foxworth**
- (United States) **T Whittington**
**6**
**6**

- (United States) K Foxworth
- (United States) T Whittington
3
3

- (West Germany) S Frankl
- (West Germany) S Hack
4
0

5
- (United States) **K Adams**
- (United States) **Z Garrison**
**6**
**6**

5
- (United States) **K Adams**
- (United States) **Z Garrison**
**6**
**6**

==== Section 2 ====
First round

Second round

Third round

Quarterfinals

3
- (United States) **G Fernández**
- (United States) **L McNeil**
6
**6**
**7**

- (Australia) D Balestrat
- (United States) H Na
**7**
3
6

3
- (United States) **G Fernández**
- (United States) **L McNeil**
**6**
**6**

- (Czechoslovakia) **P Langrová**
- (Czechoslovakia) **J Pospíšilová**
**6**
**6**

- (Czechoslovakia) P Langrová
- (Czechoslovakia) J Pospíšilová
4
1

- (Argentina) B Fulco
- (Argentina) A Villagrán
0
1

3
- (United States) **G Fernández**
- (United States) **L McNeil**
**6**
2
**7**

- (Canada) **J Hetherington**
- (United States) **K Rinaldi**
**6**
**6**

- (Canada) J Hetherington
- (United States) K Rinaldi
3
**6**
5

- (Switzerland) C Cohen
- (United States) L Spadea
2
1

- (Canada) **J Hetherington**
- (United States) **K Rinaldi**
**7**
**6**

- (West Germany) B Bunge
- (France) C Suire
4
1

16
- (Australia) N Provis
- (South Africa) E Reinach
6
2

16
- (Australia) **N Provis**
- (South Africa) **E Reinach**
**6**
**6**

3
- (United States) **G Fernández**
- (United States) **L McNeil**
**6**
**6**

11
- (United States) **T Phelps**
- (Italy) **R Reggi**
**6**
**6**

7
- (France) I Demongeot
- (France) N Tauziat
1
0

- (West Germany) W Probst
- (Czechoslovakia) R Zrubáková
3
1

11
- (United States) **T Phelps**
- (Italy) **R Reggi**
**7**
**6**

- (Argentina) C Tessi
- (Finland) P Thorén
3
2

- (France) A Dechaume
- (France) N Herreman
6
4

- (France) **A Dechaume**
- (France) **N Herreman**
**6**
**6**

11
- (United States) T Phelps
- (Italy) R Reggi
2
1

- (Brazil) L Corsato
- (Peru) P Vásquez
0
2

7
- (France) **I Demongeot**
- (France) **N Tauziat**
**6**
**6**

- (United States) **R Casals**
- (West Germany) **C Porwik**
**6**
**6**

- (United States) R Casals
- (West Germany) C Porwik
5
1

- (United States) L Bartlett
- (United States) K Steinmetz
3
1

7
- (France) **I Demongeot**
- (France) **N Tauziat**
**7**
**6**

7
- (France) **I Demongeot**
- (France) **N Tauziat**
**6**
**6**

=== Bottom half ===
==== Section 3 ====
First round

Second round

Third round

Quarterfinals

8
- (Australia) **J Byrne**
- (United States) **R White**
**6**
**6**

- (Canada) H Kelesi
- (United States) S Stafford
3
1

8
- (Australia) **J Byrne**
- (United States) **R White**
**6**
**6**

- (United States) **A Grossman**
- (Japan) **A Nishiya**
**6**
**6**

- (United States) A Grossman
- (Japan) A Nishiya
0
3

- (United States) V Procacci
- (Brazil) T Zambrzycki
2
3

8
- (Australia) J Byrne
- (United States) R White
2
**6**
1

- (Uruguay) P Miller
- (Argentina) G Mosca
1
**7**
6

14
- (United Kingdom) **J Durie**
- (United States) **M J Fernández**
**6**
3
**6**

- (Sweden) **M Strandlund**
- (Netherlands) **H Witvoet**
**6**
5
**7**

- (Sweden) M Strandlund
- (Netherlands) H Witvoet
2
6

- (Italy) L Garrone
- (Italy) L Golarsa
0
0

14
- (United Kingdom) **J Durie**
- (United States) **M J Fernández**
**6**
**7**

14
- (United Kingdom) **J Durie**
- (United States) **M J Fernández**
**6**
**6**

14
- (United Kingdom) J Durie
- (United States) M J Fernández
**7**
3
5

9
- (Netherlands) **M Bollegraf**
- (West Germany) **E Pfaff**
**6**
**6**

9
- (Netherlands) **M Bollegraf**
- (West Germany) **E Pfaff**
5
**6**
**7**

- (United States) J Kaplan
- (South Africa) M Reinach
4
4

9
- (Netherlands) **M Bollegraf**
- (West Germany) **E Pfaff**
3
**6**
**6**

- (United States) **L Allen**
- (United States) **B Bowes**
**6**
**6**

- (United States) L Allen
- (United States) B Bowes
**6**
4
0

- (United States) E Hakami
- (South Africa) K Schimper
3
3

9
- (Netherlands) **M Bollegraf**
- (West Germany) **E Pfaff**
**6**
**6**

- (United States) **L Antonoplis**
- (United States) **M Van Nostrand**
**6**
**6**

4
- (United States) E Burgin
- (United States) P Shriver
4
3

- (Peru) P Collantes
- (Chile) M Miranda
1
3

- (United States) L Antonoplis
- (United States) M Van Nostrand
3
5

- (Brazil) N Dias
- (Italy) L Ferrando
1
0

4
- (United States) **E Burgin**
- (United States) **P Shriver**
**6**
**7**

4
- (United States) **E Burgin**
- (United States) **P Shriver**
**6**
**6**

==== Section 4 ====
First round

Second round

Third round

Quarterfinals

- (United States) **G Magers**
- (United States) **W White**
**6**
**7**

(Socialist Federal Republic of Yugoslavia) S Goleš
(Argentina) P Tarabini
4
5

- (United States) G Magers
- (United States) W White
**7**
4
6

- (Hong Kong) P Hy
- (United States) M Werdel
4
3

- (Sweden) **M Lindström**
- (United States) **H Ludloff**
6
**6**
**7**

- (Sweden) **M Lindström**
- (United States) **H Ludloff**
**6**
**6**

- (Sweden) **M Lindström**
- (United States) **H Ludloff**
6
**6**
**7**

- (United States) C Benjamin
- (United Kingdom) S Gomer
5
0

- (United States) H Cioffi
- (United States) A Frazier
**7**
3
6

- (United States) **H Cioffi**
- (United States) **A Frazier**
**7**
**6**

- (United States) **H Cioffi**
- (United States) **A Frazier**
**6**
**6**

- (Sweden) **C Lindqvist**
- (Australia) **A Minter**
4
**7**
**7**

- (Sweden) C Lindqvist
- (Australia) A Minter
4
3

12
- (Argentina) M Paz
- (Denmark) T Scheuer-Larsen
**6**
5
6

- (Sweden) M Lindström
- (United States) H Ludloff
3
2

15
- (New Zealand) **B Cordwell**
- (South Africa) **D Van Rensburg**
**6**
**6**

2
- (Czechoslovakia) **J Novotná**
- (Czechoslovakia) **H Suková**
**6**
**6**

- (United States) M McGrath
- (United States) S Walsh-Pete
1
2

15
- (New Zealand) **B Cordwell**
- (South Africa) **D Van Rensburg**
6
**6**
**6**

- (Netherlands) **N Jagerman**
- (West Germany) **S Meier**
**6**
0
**6**

- (Netherlands) N Jagerman
- (West Germany) S Meier
**7**
1
3

- (United States) P Smith
- (United States) J Smoller
2
**6**
2

15
- (New Zealand) B Cordwell
- (South Africa) D Van Rensburg
**6**
3
2

- (Austria) B Paulus
- (Netherlands) B Schultz
0
2

2
- (Czechoslovakia) **J Novotná**
- (Czechoslovakia) **H Suková**
3
**6**
**6**

- (Belgium) **A Devries**
- (Switzerland) **E Krapl**
**6**
**6**

- (Belgium) A Devries
- (Switzerland) E Krapl
4
0

- (Czechoslovakia) I Budařová
- (United Kingdom) C Wood
2
2

2
- (Czechoslovakia) **J Novotná**
- (Czechoslovakia) **H Suková**
**6**
**6**

2
- (Czechoslovakia) **J Novotná**
- (Czechoslovakia) **H Suková**
**6**
**6**
