= 1990 Benson and Hedges Open =

Men's tennis tournament

- Date: 8–14 January
- Edition: 23rd
- Category: World Series
- Draw: 32S / 16D
- Prize money: $125,000
- Surface: Hard / outdoor
- Location: Auckland, New Zealand
- Venue: ASB Tennis Centre

Champions

Singles
- (United States) Scott Davis

Doubles
- (United States) Kelly Jones / (United States) Robert Van't Hof
← 1989 ·	ATP Auckland Open	· 1991 →

The 1990 Benson & Hedges Open was a men's tennis tournament played on outdoor hard courts at the ASB Tennis Centre in Auckland in New Zealand and was part of the World Series of the 1990 ATP Tour. The tournament ran from 8 January through 14 January 1990. Eighth-seeded Scott Davis won the singles title.

== Finals ==
=== Singles ===
(United States) Scott Davis defeated (Soviet Union) Andrei Chesnokov 4–6, 6–3, 6–3

- It was Davis' 1st title of the year and the 13th of his career.

=== Doubles ===
(United States) Kelly Jones / (United States) Robert Van't Hof defeated (Israel) Gilad Bloom / (Netherlands) Paul Haarhuis 7–6, 6–0

- It was Jones' 1st title of the year and the 5th of his career. It was Van't Hof's 1st title of the year and the 7th of his career.
