= 1991 Benson and Hedges Open – Doubles =

Doubles
- 1991 Benson and Hedges Open

Final
- Champions: (Spain) Sergio Casal (Spain) Emilio Sánchez
- Runners-up: (Canada) Grant Connell (Canada) Glenn Michibata
- Score: 4–6, 6–3, 6–4

Details
- Draw: 16
- Seeds: 4

Events
Singles	Doubles
← 1990 ·	ATP Auckland Open	· 1992 →

Kelly Jones and Robert Van't Hof were the defending champions, but Jones did not participate this year. Van't Hof partnered Brian Garrow, losing in the first round.

Sergio Casal and Emilio Sánchez won the title, defeating Grant Connell and Glenn Michibata 4–6, 6–3, 6–4 in the final.

== Seeds ==
1. (Canada) Grant Connell / (Canada) Glenn Michibata (final)
2. (Spain) Sergio Casal / (Spain) Emilio Sánchez (champions)
3. (Italy) Omar Camporese / (Spain) Javier Sánchez (quarterfinals)
4. (Germany) Eric Jelen / (Germany) Udo Riglewski (first round)

== Draw ==
=== Key ===
- Q = Qualifier
- WC = Wild card
- LL = Lucky loser
- Alt = Alternate
- SE = Special exempt
- PR = Protected ranking
- ITF = ITF entry
- JE = Junior exempt
- w/o = Walkover
- r = Retired
- d = Defaulted
- SR = Special ranking

=== Draw ===
First round
1	(Canada) G Connell (Canada) G Michibata	6	6
(Czechoslovakia) V Flégl (Czechoslovakia) D Vacek	1	3
(Brazil) L Mattar (United States) S Patridge	3	7	1
WC	(New Zealand) K Evernden (New Zealand) A Hunt	6	6	6
4	(Germany) E Jelen (Germany) U Riglewski	6	3	4
(United States) K Kinnear (United States) B Shelton	3	6	6
(United States) B Garrow (United States) R Van't Hof	4	6
(Venezuela) A Mora (United States) G Van Emburgh	6	7
(Netherlands) T Nijssen (Soviet Union) D Poliakov	6	6	3
(United States) J Brown (United States) S Salumaa	7	3	6
(Mexico) L Lavalle (Italy) F Mordegan	3	1
3	(Italy) O Camporese (Spain) J Sánchez	6	6
Q	(Canada) A Sznajder (United States) M Washington	2	4
(Czechoslovakia) K Nováček (Belgium) L Pimek	6	6
(United States) C Beckman (United States) S Cannon	4	4
2	(Spain) S Casal (Spain) E Sánchez	6	6

Quarterfinals
1	(Canada) G Connell (Canada) G Michibata	6	7
WC	(New Zealand) K Evernden (New Zealand) A Hunt	4	6
(United States) K Kinnear (United States) B Shelton	7	7
(Venezuela) A Mora (United States) G Van Emburgh	6	6
(United States) J Brown (United States) S Salumaa	4	7	6
3	(Italy) O Camporese (Spain) J Sánchez	6	6	3
(Czechoslovakia) K Nováček (Belgium) L Pimek	6	6
2	(Spain) S Casal (Spain) E Sánchez	7	7

Semifinals
1	(Canada) G Connell (Canada) G Michibata	6	3	6
(United States) K Kinnear (United States) B Shelton	3	6	3
(United States) J Brown (United States) S Salumaa	4	2
2	(Spain) S Casal (Spain) E Sánchez	6	6

Final
1	(Canada) G Connell (Canada) G Michibata	6	3	4
2	(Spain) S Casal (Spain) E Sánchez	4	6	6
