= 1991 Benson and Hedges Open =

- Date: 7–14 January
- Edition: 24th
- Category: World Series
- Draw: 32S / 16D
- Prize money: $150,000
- Surface: Hard / outdoor
- Location: Auckland, New Zealand

Champions

Singles
- (Czechoslovakia) Karel Nováček

Doubles
- (Spain) Sergio Casal / (Spain) Emilio Sánchez
← 1990 ·	ATP Auckland Open	· 1992 →

The 1991 Benson and Hedges Open was a men's professional tennis tournament held in Auckland, New Zealand. The even was part of the World Series category of the 1991 ATP Tour. It was the 24th edition of the tournament and was played on outdoor hard courts from 7 January to 14 January 1991. Fourth-seeded Karel Nováček won the singles title.

== Finals ==
=== Singles ===
(Czechoslovakia) Karel Nováček defeated (France) Jean-Philippe Fleurian 7–6^{(7–5)}, 7–6^{(7–4)}

- It was Nováček's 1st title of the year and the 4th of his career.

=== Doubles ===
(Spain) Sergio Casal / (Spain) Emilio Sánchez defeated (Canada) Grant Connell / (Canada) Glenn Michibata 4–6, 6–3, 6–4

- It was Casal's 1st title of the year and the 33rd of his career. It was Sánchez's 1st title of the year and the 45th of his career.
