= 1988 Benson and Hedges Open =

- Date: 4–11 January
- Edition: 21st
- Category: Grand Prix
- Draw: 32S / 16D
- Prize money: $93,400
- Surface: Hard / outdoor
- Location: Auckland, New Zealand

Champions

Singles
- (Israel) Amos Mansdorf

Doubles
- (United States) Martin Davis / (United States) Tim Pawsat
- ATP Auckland Open

The 1988 Benson and Hedges Open was a men's Grand Prix tennis tournament held in Auckland, New Zealand. It was the 21st edition of the tournament and was played on outdoor hard courts and was held from 4 January to 11 January 1988. Second-seeded Amos Mansdorf won the singles title.

== Finals ==
=== Singles ===
(Israel) Amos Mansdorf defeated (India) Ramesh Krishnan 6–3, 6–4

- It was Mansdorf's 1st title of the year and the 3rd of his career.

=== Doubles ===
(United States) Martin Davis / (United States) Tim Pawsat defeated (United States) Sammy Giammalva Jr. / (United States) Jim Grabb 6–3, 3–6. 6–4

- It was Davis's only title of the year and the 7th of his career. It was Pawsat's only title of the year and the 2nd of his career.
