= Bruce Man-Son-Hing =

Grenadian-born American tennis player

- Country (sports): United States
- Residence: Calabasas, California
- Born: April 13, 1964 (age 62) Grenada
- Height: 6 ft 0 in (1.83 m)
- Turned pro: 1986
- Plays: Right-handed

Singles
- Career record: 0-0
- Career titles: 0
- Highest ranking: No. 305 (November 21, 1988)

Doubles
- Career record: 10-16
- Career titles: 0
- Highest ranking: No. 132 (May 8, 1989)

Grand Slam doubles results
- Australian Open: 2R (1989)
- French Open: 1R (1989)
- Wimbledon: 2R (1989)
- US Open: 1R (1989)

Bruce Man-Son-Hing (born April 13, 1964) is a former professional tennis player from the United States.

== Early life and college ==
Man-Son-Hing, who is of Chinese descent, was born in Grenada on April 13, 1964. His family emigrated to Los Angeles when he was nine years old. He attended Glendale High School and went to college at UC Irvine.

== Professional career ==
After four years at UC Irvine, Man-Son-Hing joined the professional circuit.

He competed in the men's doubles at all four Grand Slam events in 1989, partnering with John Letts. They made the second round of the Australian Open and Wimbledon Championships. He also appeared in the mixed doubles draw at the French Open (with Camille Benjamin) and Wimbledon (with Cynthia MacGregor) but was unable to progress past the first round at either.

Man-Son-Hing and Letts were doubles runners-up at two Grand Prix tournaments in 1989, the Benson and Hedges Open and Seoul Open.

== Personal ==
Man-Son-Hing has two children, both whom play tennis. His daughter, Sabrina, played for Cal State Northridge and his son, Bruce Jr. played for UC Irvine.

== Grand Prix career finals ==
=== Doubles: 2 (0–2) ===
Result	W/L	Date	Tournament	Surface	Partner	Opponents	Score
Loss	0–1	Jan 1989	Auckland, New Zealand	Hard	(United States) John Letts	(New Zealand) Steve Guy (Japan) Shuzo Matsuoka	6–7, 6–7
Loss	0–2	Apr 1989	Seoul, South Korea	Hard	(United States) John Letts	(United States) Scott Davis (Kenya) Paul Wekesa	2–6, 4–6

== Challenger titles ==
=== Doubles: (3) ===
No.	Date	Tournament	Surface	Partner	Opponents	Score
1.	1988	Coquitlam, Canada	Hard	(United States) Joe DeFoor	(United States) Julian Barham (Republic of Ireland) Peter Wright	7–6, 7–6
2.	1988	Brest, France	Hard	(United States) John Letts	(France) Thierry Champion (France) François Errard	6–3, 6–3
3.	1989	Nagoya, Japan	Hard	(United States) John Letts	(United States) Jonathan Canter (India) Ramesh Krishnan	7–5, 4–6, 6–0
