= 1993 Benson and Hedges Open – Singles =

Singles
- 1993 Benson and Hedges Open

Final
- Champion: (Russia) Alexander Volkov
- Runner-up: (United States) MaliVai Washington
- Score: 7–6^{(7–2)}, 6–4

Details
- Draw: 32 (4 Q / 3 WC )
- Seeds: 8

Events
Singles	Doubles
- ATP Auckland Open

Alexander Volkov defeated MaliVai Washington 7–6^{(7–2)}, 6–4 to win the 1993 Benson and Hedges Open singles tennis competition. Jaime Yzaga was the defending champion.

== Seeds ==
A champion seed is indicated in bold text while text in italics indicates the round in which that seed was eliminated.

1. (United States) MaliVai Washington (final)
2. (Russia) Alexander Volkov **(champion)**
3. (Russia) Andrei Chesnokov (first round)
4. (Peru) Jaime Yzaga (semifinals)
5. (Brazil) Luiz Mattar (semifinals)
6. (Germany) Bernd Karbacher (first round)
7. (Uruguay) Marcelo Filippini (first round)
8. (Spain) Tomás Carbonell (second round)

== Draw ==
=== Key ===
- Q – qualifier
- WC – wild card

First round
1	(United States) **M Washington**	3	**6**	**6**
(Spain) M Górriz	**6**	4	3
(France) T Champion	4	0
(Denmark) **K Carlsen**	**6**	**6**
Q	(Germany) **J Renzenbrink**	**6**	**6**
(Czechoslovakia) M Damm	4	4
(Australia) **J Morgan**	**6**	6^{2}	**6**
7	(Uruguay) M Filippini	0	**7^{7}**	0
WC/3	(Russia) A Chesnokov	**6**	3	6^{11}
(United States) **C Adams**	4	**6**	**7^{13}**
Q	(United States) S Bryan	6^{2}	3
(Germany) **M Naewie**	**7^{7}**	**6**
(Austria) **A Antonitsch**	**6**	6^{3}	**6**
Q	(Germany) P Moraing	3	**7^{7}**	2
(Germany) M Zoecke	**6**	1	6^{4}
5	(Brazil) **L Mattar**	3	**6**	**7^{7}**
6	(Germany) B Karbacher	**6**	2	3
(United States) **B Shelton**	3	**6**	**6**
(United Kingdom) J Bates	2	1
WC	(New Zealand) **K Evernden**	**6**	**6**
(France) S Simian	2	2
(Canada) **C Pridham**	**6**	**6**
WC	(New Zealand) J Greenhalgh	4	3
4	(Peru) **J Yzaga**	**6**	**6**
8	(Spain) **T Carbonell**	6^{2}	**6**	**6**
(Netherlands) M Schapers	**7^{7}**	1	4
(New Zealand) **B Steven**	**6**	**6**
Q	(Australia) P Rafter	4	3
(Australia) S Youl	3	**6**	3
(Germany) **M Goellner**	**6**	4	**6**
(South Africa) M Ondruska	1	3
2	(Russia) **A Volkov**	**6**	**6**

Second round
1	(United States) **M Washington**	**6**	**6**
(Denmark) K Carlsen	2	2
Q	(Germany) J Renzenbrink	4	6^{5}
(Australia) **J Morgan**	**6**	**7^{7}**
(United States) **C Adams**	**6**	**6**
(Germany) M Naewie	3	3
(Austria) A Antonitsch	2	3
5	(Brazil) **L Mattar**	**6**	**6**
(United States) B Shelton	4	**7^{7}**	2
WC	(New Zealand) **K Evernden**	**6**	6^{5}	**6**
(Canada) C Pridham	2	**6**	6^{4}
4	(Peru) **J Yzaga**	**6**	3	**7^{7}**
8	(Spain) T Carbonell	2	3
(New Zealand) **B Steven**	**6**	**6**
(Germany) M Goellner	2	3
2	(Russia) **A Volkov**	**6**	**6**

Quarterfinals
1	(United States) **M Washington**	**6**	4	**6**
(Australia) J Morgan	0	**6**	3
(United States) C Adams	**6**	5	6^{3}
5	(Brazil) **L Mattar**	1	**7**	**7^{7}**
WC	(New Zealand) K Evernden	**6**	6^{1}	6^{6}
4	(Peru) **J Yzaga**	4	**7^{7}**	**7^{8}**
(New Zealand) B Steven	5	1
2	(Russia) **A Volkov**	**7**	**6**

Semifinals
1	(United States) **M Washington**	**6**	**6**
5	(Brazil) L Mattar	2	3
4	(Peru) J Yzaga	4	6^{7}
2	(Russia) **A Volkov**	**6**	**7^{9}**

Final
1	(United States) MaliVai Washington	6^{2}	4
2	(Russia) **Alexander Volkov**	**7^{7}**	**6**
