= 1993 Benson and Hedges Open =

- Date: 11–18 January
- Edition: 26th
- Category: World Series
- Draw: 32S / 16D
- Prize money: $157,500
- Surface: Hard / outdoor
- Location: Auckland, New Zealand
- Venue: ASB Tennis Centre

Champions

Singles
- (Russia) Alexander Volkov

Doubles
- (Canada) Grant Connell / (United States) Patrick Galbraith
- ATP Auckland Open

The 1993 Benson and Hedges Open was a men's ATP tennis tournament held in Auckland, New Zealand and played on outdoor hard courts. It was part of the World Series of the 1993 ATP Tour. It was the 26th edition of the tournament and was held from 11 January until 18 January 1993. Second-seeded Alexander Volkov won the singles title.

== Finals ==
=== Singles ===
(Russia) Alexander Volkov defeated (United States) MaliVai Washington 7–6^{(7–2)}, 6–4

- It was Volkov's only title of the year and the 2nd of his career.

=== Doubles ===
(Canada) Grant Connell / (United States) Patrick Galbraith defeated (Austria) Alex Antonitsch / (Russia) Alexander Volkov 6–3, 7–6

- It was Connell's 1st title of the year and the 5th of his career. It was Galbraith's 1st title of the year and the 13th of his career.
