= 1993 Benson and Hedges Open – Doubles =

Doubles
- 1993 Benson and Hedges Open

Final
- Champions: (Canada) Grant Connell (United States) Patrick Galbraith
- Runners-up: (Austria) Alex Antonitsch (Russia) Alexander Volkov
- Score: 6–3, 7–6

Details
- Draw: 16
- Seeds: 4

Events
Singles	Doubles
- ATP Auckland Open

Wayne Ferreira and Jim Grabb were the defending champions, but did not participate this year.

Grant Connell and Patrick Galbraith won the title, defeating Alex Antonitsch and Alexander Volkov 6–3, 7–6 in the final.

== Seeds ==
1. (Canada) Grant Connell / (United States) Patrick Galbraith (champions)
2. (Czech Republic) Martin Damm / (Czech Republic) Vojtěch Flégl (first round)
3. (South Africa) Royce Deppe / (New Zealand) Brett Steven (semifinals)
4. (United States) T.J. Middleton / (United States) Sven Salumaa (quarterfinals)

== Draw ==
Key

- Q = Qualifier
- WC = Wild card
- LL = Lucky loser
- Alt = Alternate
- ITF = ITF entry
- PR = Protected ranking
- SR = Special ranking
- SE = Special exempt
- JE = Junior exempt
- JR = Junior Accelerator Programme entrant
- CO = College Accelerator Programme entrant
- NG = Next Gen Accelerator Program entrant
- w/o = Walkover
- r = Retired
- d = Defaulted

=== Draw ===
First round
1	(Canada) G Connell (United States) P Galbraith	6	7
(Sweden) J Donar (Sweden) O Jonsson	3	6
(Australia) J Morgan (Australia) S Youl	6	3	5
(Italy) C Brandi (Spain) MA Gorriz	3	6	7
4	(United States) TJ Middleton (United States) S Salumaa	6	7
(United States) B Devening (Czech Republic) T Anzari	1	6
Q	(Canada) S Lareau (Canada) D Nestor	5	7	7
(United States) D Eisenman (United States) T Mercer	7	6	6
(United States) B Shelton (Sweden) T Svantesson	3	6	6
(Uruguay) M Filippini (Brazil) L Mattar	6	3	4
(Germany) L Koslowski (Germany) M Naewie	3	7	3
3	(South Africa) R Deppe (New Zealand) B Steven	6	6	6
WC	(New Zealand) A Hunt (New Zealand) G Wilson	6	4	5
(United Kingdom) J Bates (Netherlands) M Schapers	3	6	7
WC	(Austria) A Antonitsch (Russia) A Volkov	7	4	6
2	(Czech Republic) M Damm (Czech Republic) V Flégl	5	6	4

Quarterfinals
1	(Canada) G Connell (United States) P Galbraith	6	7
(Italy) C Brandi (Spain) MA Gorriz	3	6
4	(United States) TJ Middleton (United States) S Salumaa	3	4
Q	(Canada) S Lareau (Canada) D Nestor	6	6
(United States) B Shelton (Sweden) T Svantesson	4	3
3	(South Africa) R Deppe (New Zealand) B Steven	6	6
(United Kingdom) J Bates (Netherlands) M Schapers	2	2
WC	(Austria) A Antonitsch (Russia) A Volkov	6	6

Semifinals
1	(Canada) G Connell (United States) P Galbraith	0	6	6
Q	(Canada) S Lareau (Canada) D Nestor	6	3	4
3	(South Africa) R Deppe (New Zealand) B Steven	4	6	2
WC	(Austria) A Antonitsch (Russia) A Volkov	6	2	6

Final
1	(Canada) G Connell (United States) P Galbraith	6	7
WC	(Austria) A Antonitsch (Russia) A Volkov	3	6
