= Paul Wekesa =

Kenyan tennis player

- Country (sports): Kenya
- Residence: Nairobi, Kenya
- Born: 2 July 1967 (age 58) Nairobi, Kenya
- Height: 1.87 m (6 ft 1 1/2 in)
- Turned pro: 1987
- Retired: 1996
- Plays: Right-handed (one-handed backhand)
- Prize money: $448,114

Singles
- Career record: 27–43 (at ATP, Grand Prix and Grand Slam level, and in Davis Cup)
- Career titles: 0
- Highest ranking: No. 100 (1 May 1995)

Grand Slam singles results
- Australian Open: 2R (1989)
- French Open: 1R (1995)
- Wimbledon: 1R (1995)
- US Open: 1R (1995)

Doubles
- Career record: 60–77 (at ATP, Grand Prix and Grand Slam level, and in Davis Cup)
- Career titles: 3
- Highest ranking: No. 66 (23 March 1992)

Grand Slam doubles results
- Australian Open: QF (1992)
- French Open: 2R (1991)
- Wimbledon: 1R (1989, 1990, 1991, 1992, 1995)
- US Open: 3R (1991)

Paul Wekesa (born 2 July 1967) is a former professional tennis player from Kenya. He won 3 doubles titles, achieved a career-high singles ranking of World No. 100 and reached two tour-level quarterfinals at Auckland in 1989 and Seoul in 1995.

== Tennis career ==
Prior to turning professional, he won the doubles tournament at the 1987 Division II NCAA Men's Tennis Championships while attending Chapman University. During his career, Wekesa won 3 ATP Tour doubles titles. He reached the quarterfinals in doubles at the 1992 Australian Open. Wekesa won a bronze medal at the 1987 All-Africa Games held in Nairobi, Kenya. He is the only Kenyan tennis player to reach Top 100 of ATP rankings. He also features for the Kenya Davis Cup team and was still active in 1998. He was the first player to be beaten by Tim Henman in the main draw of a Grand Slam tournament, at Wimbledon in 1995. After retirement from playing, he has served as a Kenyan national teams coach. He won the "Hall of Fame" category at the 2007 Kenyan Sports Personality of the Year awards. His father Noah Wekesa is a Kenyan politician and minister.

== Career finals ==
Legend
Grand Slam (0)
Tennis Masters Cup (0)
ATP Masters Series (0)
ATP Tour (6)

=== Doubles (3 wins, 3 losses) ===
Result	W/L	Date	Tournament	Surface	Partner	Opponents	Score
Win	1–0	Oct 1988	Tel Aviv, Israel	Hard	(The Bahamas) Roger Smith	(Germany) Patrick Baur (Germany) Alexander Mronz	6–3, 6–3
Win	2–0	Apr 1989	Seoul, South Korea	Hard	(United States) Scott Davis	(United States) John Letts (United States) Bruce Man-Son-Hing	6–2, 6–4
Loss	2–1	Apr 1989	Singapore	Hard	(United States) Paul Chamberlin	(United States) Rick Leach (United States) Jim Pugh	3–6, 4–6
Loss	2–2	Aug 1990	Los Angeles, United States	Hard	(Sweden) Peter Lundgren	(United States) Scott Davis (United States) David Pate	6–3, 1–6, 3–6
Win	3–2	Nov 1991	Birmingham, U.K.	Carpet (i)	(Netherlands) Jacco Eltingh	(Sweden) Ronnie Båthman (Sweden) Rikard Bergh	7–5, 7–5
Loss	3–3	Aug 1994	Umag, Croatia	Clay	(Slovakia) Karol Kučera	(Uruguay) Diego Pérez (Spain) Francisco Roig	2–6, 4–6
