= John Letts (tennis) =

American tennis player

- Country (sports): United States
- Born: May 11, 1964 (age 61) Houston, Texas, United States
- Height: 6 ft 1 in (1.85 m)
- Plays: Right-handed (two-handed backhand)
- Coach: Larry Easley
- Prize money: $89,800

Singles
- Career record: 4–11
- Career titles: 0; 0 Challenger, 0 Futures
- Highest ranking: No. 244 (13 June 1988)

Grand Slam singles results
- Australian Open: 2R (1987)
- Wimbledon: Q2 (1989)
- US Open: 1R (1982)

Doubles
- Career record: 35–51
- Career titles: 1; 2 Challenger, 0 Futures
- Highest ranking: No. 69 (20 October 1986)

Grand Slam doubles results
- Australian Open: QF (1985)
- French Open: 1R (1989)
- Wimbledon: 2R (1989)
- US Open: 2R (1987)

Grand Slam mixed doubles results
- Australian Open: 1R (1987)
- French Open: 1R (1989)
- Wimbledon: 2R (1987)

John Letts (born May 11, 1964), is a former professional tennis player from the United States. He enjoyed most of his tennis success while playing doubles. During his career, he won seven ATP tour doubles titles and reached four ATP tour doubles finals. He also reached the quarterfinals of the 1985 Australian Open in doubles knocking out the 3rd seeded team of Tomáš Šmíd and John Fitzgerald in the second round.

Born in Houston, Texas, Letts grew up in Southern California.

The 1982 U.S. National Champion for boys 18 & under, Letts received a full scholarship to Stanford University, where he was a two-time All-American and member of two NCAA championship teams. At Stanford, he partnered with three doubles players who later reached the top five in the world: Scott Davis, Jim Grabb, and Patrick McEnroe.

He reached a high of No. 244 in the world in singles achieving most of his success on the ATP Challenger Tour including the semifinals of Manchester (1989) and San Luis Potosí (1988) and the quarterfinals of Nagoya (1988) and Dublin (1989). In Grand Slam singles, he reached the second round of the 1987 Australian Open before losing to eventual champion Stefan Edberg in four sets. He played the opening match on the grandstand court at the new Australian Open facility in 1988 at Melbourne Park, losing to Australian Todd Woodbridge in 3 sets. A torn rotator cuff suffered in 1989 eventually ended Letts' playing career.

Letts attended law school and graduated cum laude from the Northwestern University School of Law in 1994. He practiced intellectual property law for Brinks, Hofer, Gilson & Lione in Chicago from 1994 to 1998.

In 1999, Letts founded iTennis, Inc., a tennis coaching and management company in Southern California.

His older sister, Elizabeth, is a #1 New York Times Best-Selling author.

== ATP career finals ==
=== Doubles: 4 (1 title, 3 runner-ups) ===
Legend Grand Slam Tournaments (0–0) ATP World Tour Finals (0–0) ATP Masters 1000 Series (0–0) ATP 500 Series (0–0) ATP 250 Series (1–3)	Finals by surface Hard (1–3) Clay (0–0) Grass (0–0) Carpet (0–0)	Finals by setting Outdoors (1–3) Indoors (0–0)

Result	W–L	Date	Tournament	Tier	Surface	Partner	Opponents	Score
Win	1–0	Oct 1986	Tel Aviv, Israel	Grand Prix	Hard	(Sweden) Peter Lundgren	(South Africa) Christo Steyn (South Africa) Danie Visser	6–3, 3–6, 6–3
Loss	1–1	Jan 1989	Auckland, New Zealand	Grand Prix	Hard	(United States) Bruce Man-Son-Hing	(New Zealand) Steve Guy (Japan) Shuzo Matsuoka	6–7, 6–7
Loss	1–2	Apr 1989	Seoul Open, South Korea	Grand Prix	Hard	(United States) Bruce Man-Son-Hing	(United States) Scott Davis (Kenya) Paul Wekesa	2–6, 4–6
Loss	1–3	Jan 1991	Wellington, New Zealand	World Series	Hard	(Brazil) Jaime Oncins	(Brazil) Luiz Mattar (Venezuela) Nicolás Pereira	6–4, 6–7, 2–6

== ATP Challenger and ITF Futures finals ==
=== Doubles: 3 (2–1) ===
Legend ATP Challenger (2–1) ITF Futures (0–0)	Finals by surface Hard (2–0) Clay (0–1) Grass (0–0) Carpet (0–0)

Result	W–L	Date	Tournament	Tier	Surface	Partner	Opponents	Score
Win	1–0	Apr 1989	Nagoya, Japan	Challenger	Hard	(United States) Bruce Man-Son-Hing	(India) Ramesh Krishnan (United States) Jonathan Canter	7–5, 4–6, 6–0
Win	2–0	Oct 1990	Singapore, Singapore	Challenger	Hard	(New Zealand) Steve Guy	(United States) Mark Keil (United States) Kent Kinnear	6–1, 7–5
Loss	2–1	Feb 1991	São Paulo, Brazil	Challenger	Clay	(United States) Tom Mercer	(Sweden) Henrik Holm (Sweden) Nils Holm	7–5, 4–6, 4–6

== Performance timeline ==
Key
W	F	SF	QF	#R	RR	Q#	DNQ	A	NH

(W) winner; (F) finalist; (SF) semifinalist; (QF) quarterfinalist; (#R) rounds 4, 3, 2, 1; (RR) round-robin stage; (Q#) qualification round; (DNQ) did not qualify; (A) absent; (NH) not held; (SR) strike rate (events won / competed); (W–L) win–loss record.

=== Doubles ===
Tournament	1985	1986	1987	1988	1989	1990	1991	1992	SR	W–L	Win %
Grand Slam tournaments
Australian Open	QF	A	2R	1R	2R	A	A	A	0 / 4	5–4	56%
French Open	A	A	A	A	1R	A	A	A	0 / 1	0–1	0%
Wimbledon	A	A	1R	Q2	2R	A	A	A	0 / 2	1–2	33%
US Open	A	1R	2R	A	1R	A	A	A	0 / 3	1–3	25%
Win–loss	3–1	0–1	2–3	0–1	2–4	0–0	0–0	0–0	0 / 10	7–10	41%
ATP Masters Series
Miami	A	A	1R	1R	2R	A	A	A	0 / 3	1–3	25%
Rome	A	A	A	A	1R	A	A	A	0 / 1	0–1	0%
Canada	A	1R	1R	A	1R	A	A	Q2	0 / 3	0–3	0%
Cincinnati	A	A	A	A	A	1R	A	Q1	0 / 1	0–1	0%
Win–loss	0–0	0–1	0–2	0–1	1–3	0–1	0–0	0–0	0 / 8	1–8	11%
