= Steve Guy =

New Zealand tennis player

- Country (sports): New Zealand
- Born: 15 March 1959 (age 66); Wellington, New Zealand
- Height: 188 cm (6 ft 2 in)
- Plays: Right-handed
- Prize money: $162,353

Singles
- Career record: 18-38
- Career titles: 0; 1 Challenger, 0 Futures
- Highest ranking: No. 109 (7 November 1988)

Grand Slam singles results
- Australian Open: 1R (1987, 1988, 1989)
- Wimbledon: Q3 (1989, 1991)

Other tournaments
- Olympic Games: Q1 (1988)

Doubles
- Career record: 28-47
- Career titles: 1; 5 Challenger, 0 Futures
- Highest ranking: No. 97 (16 January 1989)

Grand Slam doubles results
- Australian Open: 2R (1988)
- French Open: 1R (1989)
- Wimbledon: Q3 (1990)

Grand Slam mixed doubles results
- Australian Open: 1R (1989)
- Last updated on: 11 August 2022.

Steve Guy (born 15 March 1959) is a former professional tennis player from New Zealand.

== Career ==
He won the Singapore Open Championships played on grass at the Singapore Cricket Club in 1986, it was the 65th and last edition of the event. Guy appeared in the singles draw of three Australian Opens and never progressed past the second round. He did however, in the 1989 Australian Open, win the second set against third seed Boris Becker. In doubles he competed in five Grand Slams but registered just one win, in the 1988 Australian Open, with countryman Bruce Derlin. At the 1991 Australian Open, Guy partnered Swedish great Stefan Edberg.

His only ATP Tour title came in the doubles at the 1989 Heineken Open in Auckland. As a singles player he made quarter-finals at the 1988 Frankfurt Open, 1990 OTB International Open and the 1990 Benson & Hedges Open. At the Benson & Hedges Open, which he entered as a wildcard, he upset second seed and world number 25 Miloslav Mečíř.

He also played tennis for the New Zealand Davis Cup team, taking part in seven ties. He had a 3/4 record in singles and 2/1 record in doubles.

== ATP career finals ==
=== Doubles: 1 (1 title) ===
Legend Grand Slam Tournaments (0–0) ATP World Tour Finals (0–0) ATP Masters 1000 Series (0–0) ATP 500 Series (0–0) ATP 250 Series (1–0)	Finals by surface Hard (1–0) Clay (0–0) Grass (0–0) Carpet (0–0)	Finals by setting Outdoors (1–0) Indoors (0–0)

Result	W–L	Date	Tournament	Tier	Surface	Partner	Opponents	Score
Win	1–0	Jan 1989	Auckland, New Zealand	Grand Prix	Hard	(Japan) Shuzo Matsuoka	(United States) John Letts (United States) Bruce Man-Son-Hing	7–6, 7–6

== ATP Challenger and ITF Futures finals ==
=== Singles: 2 (1–1) ===
Legend ATP Challenger (1–1) ITF Futures (0–0)	Finals by surface Hard (1–1) Clay (0–0) Grass (0–0) Carpet (0–0)

Result	W–L	Date	Tournament	Tier	Surface	Opponent	Score
Loss	0–1	Oct 1988	Nugra Santana, Indonesia	Challenger	Hard	(Australia) Shane Barr	6–1, 5–7, 3–6
Win	1–1	Sep 1989	Thessaloniki, Greece	Challenger	Hard	(Australia) Neil Borwick	6–4, 6–4

=== Doubles: 6 (5–1) ===
Legend ATP Challenger (5–1) ITF Futures (0–0)	Finals by surface Hard (5–0) Clay (0–1) Grass (0–0) Carpet (0–0)

Result	W–L	Date	Tournament	Tier	Surface	Partner	Opponents	Score
Win	1–0	Aug 1989	Kuala Lumpur, Malaysia	Challenger	Hard	(India) Zeeshan Ali	(Denmark) Morten Christensen (Denmark) Peter Flintsoe	6–4, 6–4
Win	2–0	Aug 1989	Hong Kong, Hong Kong	Challenger	Hard	(New Zealand) David Lewis	(Australia) Russell Barlow (Australia) Gavin Pfitzner	6–4, 6–2
Win	3–0	Oct 1990	Singapore, Singapore	Challenger	Hard	(United States) John Letts	(United States) Mark Keil (United States) Kent Kinnear	6–1, 7–5
Win	4–0	Apr 1992	Jerusalem, Israel	Challenger	Hard	(Australia) Carl Limberger	(United States) Brian Joelson (United States) Richard Matuszewski	7–6, 6–2
Loss	4–1	Jul 1992	New Ulm, Germany	Challenger	Clay	(New Zealand) Bruce Derlin	(Argentina) Gustavo Luza (Argentina) Daniel Orsanic	3–6, 2–6
Win	5–1	Nov 1992	Manila, Philippines	Challenger	Hard	(Australia) Richard Fromberg	(Italy) Massimo Ardinghi (Italy) Mario Visconti	6–3, 6–4

== Performance timelines ==
Key
W	F	SF	QF	#R	RR	Q#	DNQ	A	NH

(W) winner; (F) finalist; (SF) semifinalist; (QF) quarterfinalist; (#R) rounds 4, 3, 2, 1; (RR) round-robin stage; (Q#) qualification round; (DNQ) did not qualify; (A) absent; (NH) not held; (SR) strike rate (events won / competed); (W–L) win–loss record.

=== Singles ===
Tournament	1984	1985	1986	1987	1988	1989	1990	1991	SR	W–L	Win %
Grand Slam tournaments
Australian Open	Q2	Q2	A	1R	1R	1R	A	Q3	0 / 3	0–3	0%
French Open	A	A	A	A	A	A	A	A	0 / 0	0–0	–
Wimbledon	A	A	A	Q1	A	Q3	Q1	Q3	0 / 0	0–0	–
US Open	A	A	A	A	A	A	A	A	0 / 0	0–0	–
Win–loss	0–0	0–0	0–0	0–1	0–1	0–1	0–0	0–0	0 / 3	0–3	0%
National Representation
Summer Olympics	A	Not Held			Q1	Not Held			0 / 0	0–0	–

=== Doubles ===
Tournament	1987	1988	1989	1990	1991	SR	W–L	Win %
Grand Slam tournaments
Australian Open	A	2R	1R	1R	1R	0 / 4	1–4	20%
French Open	A	A	1R	A	A	0 / 1	0–1	0%
Wimbledon	Q1	A	Q1	Q3	Q2	0 / 0	0–0	–
US Open	A	A	A	A	A	0 / 0	0–0	–
Win–loss	0–0	1–1	0–2	0–1	0–1	0 / 5	1–5	17%
ATP Masters Series
Miami	A	2R	2R	A	A	0 / 2	2–2	50%
Win–loss	0–0	1–1	1–1	0–0	0–0	0 / 2	2–2	50%
