= Shuzo Matsuoka =

Japanese tennis player and motivational speaker

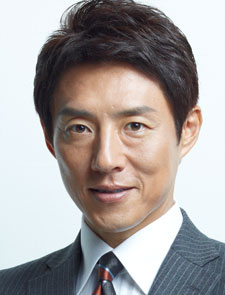
- Matsuoka in 2014
- Country (sports): Japan
- Residence: Tokyo, Japan
- Born: 6 November 1967 (age 58) Tokyo, Japan
- Height: 1.88 m (6 ft 2 in)
- Turned pro: 1986
- Retired: 1998
- Plays: Right-handed (two-handed backhand)
- Prize money: $1,117,112
- Official website: http://www.shuzo.co.jp/

Singles
- Career record: 145–163
- Career titles: 1
- Highest ranking: No. 46 (6 July 1992)

Grand Slam singles results
- Australian Open: 2R (1989)
- French Open: 2R (1992, 1993)
- Wimbledon: QF (1995)
- US Open: 2R (1988, 1990, 1993)

Doubles
- Career record: 28–44
- Career titles: 1
- Highest ranking: No. 95 (16 January 1989)

Grand Slam doubles results
- Australian Open: 1R (1989)
- US Open: 1R (1988)

Shuzo Matsuoka (松岡 修造, Matsuoka Shūzō; born 6 November 1967) is a retired Japanese professional tennis player, sports commentator, entertainer, and motivational speaker. A former Wimbledon quarter-finalist, Matsuoka won one singles title during his career, in Seoul in 1992. In the same year, he reached a career-high ranking of world No. 46. After his tennis career, he became known online for a series of short motivational videos, some edited by fans.

== Professional career ==
Matsuoka turned professional in 1986. In 1989, he finished runner-up in the top-level tournament at Wellington, and captured the doubles title in Auckland. 1991 saw Matsuoka achieve his career-best Masters result, when he reached the quarter-finals of the 1991 Canada Masters in Montreal, beating Michael Chang in a dramatic 3-set battle en route.

In 1992, Matsuoka became the first Japanese player to win a singles event on the ATP Tour when he captured the title in Seoul. He was also runner-up at the prestigious grass court tournament at Queen's Club that year, beating Goran Ivanisevic and world no. 2 Stefan Edberg in earlier rounds before losing to Wayne Ferreira in the final.

Unsurprisingly, as a skilled grass-court player, Matsuoka's best performance at a Grand Slam event came at Wimbledon in 1995, where he reached the quarter-finals, beating Karel Nováček, Mark Knowles, Javier Frana and Michael Joyce before being knocked out by Pete Sampras. Matsuoka won the first set tie-break but Sampras came back to win in four sets.

Throughout the 1995 Tour, Matsuoka suffered from chronic muscle cramps. In February, during a match against Joseph Lizardo at the Davis Cup, he sustained an injury that required him to withdraw.

At the US Open of 1995, during the fourth set of his first round match against Petr Korda, Matsuoka collapsed from severe cramping in his thighs which left him writhing in pain on the court for several minutes. The rules at the time meant that Matsuoka would have forfeited the match if he had gotten medical attention, so he was left to suffer until he was defaulted for delaying the match. The incident led to a change in the rules of professional tennis to allow players to receive medical treatment during matches.

Matsuoka's career-high rankings were world No. 46 in singles (in 1992) and World No. 95 in doubles (in 1989). His career prize-money earnings totaled $1,117,112. He retired from the professional tour in April 1998.

== Post-retirement ==
Since his retirement from tennis Matsuoka has become a popular television sports commentator in Japan. He is a sportscaster for Hodo Station, hosting interviews and segments that focus on talented athletes. He also hosts the "Shuzo Challenge", an annual tennis camp for young children created by the JTA. Kei Nishikori, former World No. 4 and Japanese No. 1, attended the camp when he was 12 years old.

Known for his passionate and energetic character, Matsuoka has also appeared in numerous variety programs, as well as in a cameo role for a television drama series. Since 2000, he has been the host of a weekly cooking mini-program, Kuishinbo! Bansai, on Fuji TV. In 2008 Matsuoka was featured in ten television commercials, tying him with Takuya Kimura for the celebrity to be featured in the greatest number of Japanese television commercials that year.

Since 2006, Matsuoka has been releasing a web series of motivational videos called For you (こんなあなたに･･･, Konna Anata ni...), shot at locations he visits for work. They feature Matsuoka shouting phrases of encouragement at the camera, sometimes in ridiculous or bizarre scenarios. These videos have become popular with both Japanese and Western internet users, accumulating millions of views and being edited in the form of MADs or having uplifting music added to them. In one of his most well-known videos, Matsuoka is harvesting Asian clams in the water at −10 °C and he shouts "Never give up" in English. In 2009, Matsuoka expressed excitement at the popularity of his For you series and the MADs, the latter numbering in the thousands by 2011.

== Personal life ==
Matsuoka married former TV Tokyo announcer Emiko Taguchi in 1998, and has three children. His father, Isao Matsuoka, was chairman of Toho Co., Ltd., the Japanese film studio known for its Godzilla movies as well as numerous Akira Kurosawa films, and Shuzo's older brother Hiroyasu is currently the company's CEO. He has a daughter, who debuted in Takarazuka Revue in 2019 as part of the 105th class (her stage name is Kishou Kazuto).

== Career finals ==
=== Singles (1 win, 2 losses) ===
Legend (singles)
Grand Slam (0)
Tennis Masters Cup (0)
ATP Masters Series (0)
ATP Tour (1)

Result	W/L	Date	Tournament	Surface	Opponent	Score
Loss	0–1	Jan 1989	Wellington, New Zealand	Hard	(New Zealand) Kelly Evernden	5–7, 6–1, 4–6
Win	1–1	Apr 1992	Seoul, Korea	Hard	(Australia) Todd Woodbridge	6–3, 4–6, 7–5
Loss	1–2	Jun 1992	Queen's Club, UK	Grass	(South Africa) Wayne Ferreira	3–6, 4–6

=== Doubles (1 win, 1 loss) ===
Result	W/L	Date	Tournament	Surface	Partner	Opponents	Score
Win	1–0	Jan 1989	Auckland, New Zealand	Hard	(New Zealand) Steve Guy	(United States) John Letts (United States) Bruce Man-Son-Hing	7–6, 7–6
Loss	1–1	Jan 1995	Jakarta, Indonesia	Hard	(Haiti) Ronald Agénor	(South Africa) David Adams (Russia) Andrei Olhovskiy	2–6, 4–6

== Filmography ==
- Crayon Shin-chan (2015), himself (voice)
- Rikuoh (2017), Jōji Misono
