= 1994 KAL Cup Korea Open – Singles =

Singles
- 1994 KAL Cup Korea Open

Final
- Champion: (United Kingdom) Jeremy Bates
- Runner-up: (Germany) Jörn Renzenbrink
- Score: 6–4, 6–7^{(6–8)}, 6–3

Details
- Draw: 32
- Seeds: 8

Events
Singles	Doubles
← 1993 ·	Seoul Open	· 1995 →

Chuck Adams was the defending champion, but lost in the quarterfinals this year.

Jeremy Bates won the title, defeating Jörn Renzenbrink 6–4, 6–7^{(6–8)}, 6–3 in the final. It was the only singles tour title of his career.

== Seeds ==
1. (Australia) Patrick Rafter (second round)
2. (United States) Chuck Adams (quarterfinals)
3. (New Zealand) Brett Steven (quarterfinals)
4. (Australia) Jamie Morgan (quarterfinals)
5. (Sweden) Jonas Björkman (first round)
6. (Netherlands) Jan Siemerink (semifinals)
7. (Russia) Andrei Olhovskiy (first round)
8. (Venezuela) Maurice Ruah (second round)

== Draw ==
=== Key ===
- Q = Qualifier
- WC = Wild card
- LL = Lucky loser
- Alt = Alternate
- ITF = ITF entry
- PR = Protected ranking
- SR = Special ranking
- SE = Special exempt
- JE = Junior exempt
- JR = Junior Accelerator Programme entrant
- CO = College Accelerator Programme entrant
- NG = Next Gen Accelerator Program entrant
- w/o = Walkover
- r = Retired
- d = Defaulted

=== Finals ===
Semifinals
(Germany) Jörn Renzenbrink	7^{7}	6
(United States) Jeff Tarango	6^{4}	4
6	(Netherlands) Jan Siemerink	3	6	6^{4}
(United Kingdom) Jeremy Bates	6	2	7^{7}

Final
(Germany) Jörn Renzenbrink	4	7^{8}	3
(United Kingdom) Jeremy Bates	6	6^{6}	6

=== Top half ===
First round
1	(Australia) P Rafter	7^{8}	7
Q	(Germany) A Finnberg	6^{6}	3
(Germany) M Zoecke	6	6
WC	(South Korea) E-j Chang	3	3
(Denmark) K Carlsen	7^{11}	6
(Italy) G Pozzi	6^{9}	2
(Germany) J Renzenbrink	7^{7}	6
7	(Russia) A Olhovskiy	6^{2}	3
3	(New Zealand) B Steven	7^{7}	3	7^{7}
(France) S Simian	6^{5}	6	6^{5}
Q	(United States) L Gloria	6	4	6^{2}
(Australia) P Kilderry	2	6	7^{7}
(United States) J Tarango	7^{8}	6
(Japan) S Matsuoka	6^{6}	2
(Australia) S Stolle	6	6
5	(Sweden) J Björkman	4	3

Second round
1	(Australia) P Rafter	6^{2}	1
(Germany) M Zoecke	7^{7}	6
(Denmark) K Carlsen	3	4
(Germany) J Renzenbrink	6	6
3	(New Zealand) B Steven	7^{7}	4	6
(Australia) P Kilderry	6^{4}	6	2
(United States) J Tarango	6	6
(Australia) S Stolle	3	3

Quarterfinals
(Germany) M Zoecke	7^{7}	6^{4}	6^{4}
(Germany) J Renzenbrink	6^{2}	7^{7}	7^{7}
3	(New Zealand) B Steven	3	4
(United States) J Tarango	6	6

Semifinals
(Germany) J Renzenbrink	7^{7}	6
(United States) J Tarango	6^{4}	4

=== Bottom half ===
First round
6	(Netherlands) J Siemerink	6	6
(United States) R Matuszewski	3	2
(Canada) S Lareau	0	6	6^{6}
(United Kingdom) M Petchey	6	3	7^{8}
(United States) K Thorne	6	1	3
(Germany) A Mronz	3	6	6
(Australia) N Borwick	6	3	3
4	(Australia) J Morgan	4	6	6
8	(Venezuela) M Ruah	7	6
(United States) M Blackman	5	3
WC	(South Korea) Y-i Yoon	4	7^{7}	3
(United Kingdom) J Bates	6	6^{2}	6
Q	(South Korea) Yoon Jong-woong	1	3
WC	(South Korea) H-c Shin	6	6
Q	(South Korea) C-w Kim	3	6^{8}
2	(United States) C Adams	6	7^{10}

Second round
6	(Netherlands) J Siemerink	7^{7}	6
(United Kingdom) M Petchey	6^{1}	1
(Germany) A Mronz	6	5	3
4	(Australia) J Morgan	2	7	6
8	(Venezuela) M Ruah	1	2
(United Kingdom) J Bates	6	6
WC	(South Korea) H-c Shin	4	2
2	(United States) C Adams	6	6

Quarterfinals
6	(Netherlands) J Siemerink	6	6
4	(Australia) J Morgan	4	2
(United Kingdom) J Bates	6	7
2	(United States) C Adams	4	5

Semifinals
6	(Netherlands) J Siemerink	3	6	6^{4}
(United Kingdom) J Bates	6	2	7^{7}
