= 1993 KAL Cup Korea Open – Doubles =

Doubles
- 1993 KAL Cup Korea Open

Final
- Champions: (Sweden) Jan Apell (Sweden) Peter Nyborg
- Runners-up: (United Kingdom) Neil Broad (South Africa) Gary Muller
- Score: 5–7, 7–6, 6–2

Details
- Draw: 16
- Seeds: 4

Events
Singles	Doubles
← 1992 ·	KAL Cup Korea Open	· 1994 →

Kelly Evernden and Brad Pearce were the defending champions, but did not participate together this year. Evernden partnered Brett Steven, losing in the semifinals. Pearce partnered David Rikl, losing in the first round.

Jan Apell and Peter Nyborg won the title, defeating Neil Broad and Gary Muller 5–7, 7–6, 6–2 in the final.

== Seeds ==
1. (United States) Brad Pearce / (Czech Republic) David Rikl (first round)
2. (United Kingdom) Neil Broad / (South Africa) Gary Muller (final)
3. (South Africa) John-Laffnie de Jager / (South Africa) Christo van Rensburg (quarterfinals)
4. N/A

== Draw ==
=== Key ===
- Q = Qualifier
- WC = Wild card
- LL = Lucky loser
- Alt = Alternate
- ITF = ITF entry
- PR = Protected ranking
- SR = Special ranking
- SE = Special exempt
- JE = Junior exempt
- JR = Junior Accelerator Programme entrant
- CO = College Accelerator Programme entrant
- NG = Next Gen Accelerator Program entrant
- w/o = Walkover
- r = Retired
- d = Defaulted

=== Draw ===
First round
1	(United States) B Pearce (Czech Republic) D Rikl	6	6
(United States) R Matuszewski (France) S Simian	7	7
WC	(South Korea) E-j Chang (South Korea) C-w Kim	7	7
(South Africa) M Barnard (South Africa) J de Beer	6	6
3	(South Africa) J-L de Jager (South Africa) C van Rensburg	6	7
(United States) R Benson (Australia) N Borwick	4	6
(Austria) A Antonitsch (United States) B Devening	7	1	4
(Sweden) J Apell (Sweden) P Nyborg	6	6	6
WC	(South Korea) H-c Shin (South Korea) Y-i Yoon	6	6
(Australia) A Kratzmann (Italy) G Pozzi	7	7
(New Zealand) K Evernden (New Zealand) B Steven	6	5	6
LL	(South Korea) N-h Kim (South Korea) G-t Roh	1	7	4
(Brazil) F Roese (Czech Republic) D Vacek	6	7	7
Q	(Canada) S Lareau (Canada) M Laurendeau	7	6	6
(United States) D Randall (United States) K Thorne	5	5
2	(United Kingdom) N Broad (South Africa) G Muller	7	7

Quarterfinals
(United States) R Matuszewski (France) S Simian	4	6
WC	(South Korea) E-j Chang (South Korea) C-w Kim	6	7
3	(South Africa) J-L de Jager (South Africa) C van Rensburg	7	6	6
(Sweden) J Apell (Sweden) P Nyborg	6	7	7
(Australia) A Kratzmann (Italy) G Pozzi	1	2
(New Zealand) K Evernden (New Zealand) B Steven	6	6
(Brazil) F Roese (Czech Republic) D Vacek	6	3
2	(United Kingdom) N Broad (South Africa) G Muller	7	6

Semifinals
WC	(South Korea) E-j Chang (South Korea) C-w Kim	5	7	4
(Sweden) J Apell (Sweden) P Nyborg	7	6	6
(New Zealand) K Evernden (New Zealand) B Steven	2	4
2	(United Kingdom) N Broad (South Africa) G Muller	6	6

Final
(Sweden) J Apell (Sweden) P Nyborg	5	7	6
2	(United Kingdom) N Broad (South Africa) G Muller	7	6	2
