= 1993 KAL Cup Korea Open – Singles =

Singles
- 1993 KAL Cup Korea Open

Final
- Champion: (United States) Chuck Adams
- Runner-up: (Australia) Todd Woodbridge
- Score: 6–4, 6–4

Details
- Draw: 32
- Seeds: 8

Events
Singles	Doubles
← 1992 ·	KAL Cup Korea Open	· 1994 →

Shuzo Matsuoka was the defending champion, but lost in the quarterfinals this year.

Chuck Adams won the title, defeating Todd Woodbridge 6–4, 6–4 in the final.

== Seeds ==
1. (New Zealand) Brett Steven (second round)
2. (France) Stéphane Simian (quarterfinals)
3. (Italy) Gianluca Pozzi (first round)
4. (Japan) Shuzo Matsuoka (quarterfinals)
5. (Australia) Todd Woodbridge (final)
6. N/A
7. (Australia) Jamie Morgan (second round)
8. (United States) Chuck Adams (champion)

== Draw ==
=== Key ===
- Q = Qualifier
- WC = Wild card
- LL = Lucky loser
- Alt = Alternate
- ITF = ITF entry
- PR = Protected ranking
- SR = Special ranking
- SE = Special exempt
- JE = Junior exempt
- JR = Junior Accelerator Programme entrant
- CO = College Accelerator Programme entrant
- NG = Next Gen Accelerator Program entrant
- w/o = Walkover
- r = Retired
- d = Defaulted

=== Finals ===
Semifinals
(Germany) Markus Zoecke	7^{7}	2	2
5	(Australia) Todd Woodbridge	6^{3}	6	6
(South Africa) Christo van Rensburg	4	3
8	(United States) Chuck Adams	6	6

Final
5	(Australia) Todd Woodbridge	4	4
8	(United States) Chuck Adams	6	6

=== Top half ===
First round
1	(New Zealand) B Steven	6	6
Q	(United States) S Bryan	4	3
(Germany) M Zoecke	7^{7}	7
(United States) R Matuszewski	6^{3}	5
(Austria) A Antonitsch	7	6^{3}	6
Q	(United States) B Pearce	5	7^{7}	3
WC	(South Korea) E-j Chang	5	6^{5}
7	(Australia) J Morgan	7	7^{7}
4	(Japan) S Matsuoka	6	7^{13}
Q	(United States) D DiLucia	4	6^{11}
(Brazil) F Roese	3	4
(Canada) C Pridham	6	6
(Canada) G Rusedski	6^{2}	6^{5}
(Czech Republic) D Vacek	7^{7}	7^{7}
(Germany) P Baur	6	3	6^{5}
5	(Australia) T Woodbridge	2	6	7^{7}

Second round
1	(New Zealand) B Steven	2	3
(Germany) M Zoecke	6	6
(Austria) A Antonitsch	7^{7}	6
7	(Australia) J Morgan	6^{3}	2
4	(Japan) S Matsuoka	7^{7}	7^{7}
(Canada) C Pridham	6^{4}	6^{5}
(Czech Republic) D Vacek	6^{3}	4
5	(Australia) T Woodbridge	7^{7}	6

Quarterfinals
(Germany) M Zoecke	6	7^{8}
(Austria) A Antonitsch	4	6^{6}
4	(Japan) S Matsuoka	4	5
5	(Australia) T Woodbridge	6	7

Semifinals
(Germany) M Zoecke	7^{7}	2	2
5	(Australia) T Woodbridge	6^{3}	6	6

=== Bottom half ===
First round
LL	(Sweden) J Apell	6	2	6
(Australia) J Stoltenberg	3	6	3
(Czech Republic) D Rikl	7^{7}	3	3
(South Africa) C van Rensburg	6^{5}	6	6
(United States) T Ho	7^{7}	5	4
(Netherlands) M Schapers	6^{5}	7	6
WC	(South Korea) Y-i Yoon	6	6
3	(Italy) G Pozzi	1	2
8	(United States) C Adams	7^{7}	6
(South Africa) G Muller	6^{4}	4
(United States) R Weiss	5	1
Q	(Australia) N Borwick	7	6
WC	(South Korea) H-c Shin	6	6
(Zimbabwe) B Black	3	2
(United States) K Thorne	6	6^{7}	2
2	(France) S Simian	2	7^{9}	6

Second round
LL	(Sweden) J Apell	6^{3}	4
(South Africa) C van Rensburg	7^{7}	6
(Netherlands) M Schapers	6	7^{8}
WC	(South Korea) Y-i Yoon	3	6^{6}
8	(United States) C Adams	6	6
Q	(Australia) N Borwick	1	2
WC	(South Korea) H-c Shin	2	4
2	(France) S Simian	6	6

Quarterfinals
(South Africa) C van Rensburg	7^{7}	7
(Netherlands) M Schapers	6^{5}	5
8	(United States) C Adams	7^{11}	4	6
2	(France) S Simian	6^{9}	6	1

Semifinals
(South Africa) C van Rensburg	4	3
8	(United States) C Adams	6	6
