= 1994 KAL Cup Korea Open – Doubles =

Doubles
- 1994 KAL Cup Korea Open

Final
- Champions: (France) Stéphane Simian (United States) Kenny Thorne
- Runners-up: (United States) Kent Kinnear (Canada) Sébastien Lareau
- Score: 6–4, 3–6, 7–5

Details
- Draw: 16
- Seeds: 4

Events
Singles	Doubles
← 1993 ·	Seoul Open	· 1995 →

Jan Apell and Peter Nyborg were the defending champions, but did not participate this year.

Stéphane Simian and Kenny Thorne won the title, defeating Kent Kinnear and Sébastien Lareau 6–4, 3–6, 7–5 in the final.

== Seeds ==
1. (South Africa) David Adams / (Russia) Andrei Olhovskiy (first round)
2. (Sweden) Jonas Björkman / (Australia) Patrick Rafter (semifinals)
3. (New Zealand) Brett Steven / (Australia) Sandon Stolle (quarterfinals)
4. (United States) Kent Kinnear / (Canada) Sébastien Lareau (final)

== Draw ==
=== Key ===
- Q = Qualifier
- WC = Wild card
- LL = Lucky loser
- Alt = Alternate
- ITF = ITF entry
- PR = Protected ranking
- SR = Special ranking
- SE = Special exempt
- JE = Junior exempt
- JR = Junior Accelerator Programme entrant
- CO = College Accelerator Programme entrant
- NG = Next Gen Accelerator Program entrant
- w/o = Walkover
- r = Retired
- d = Defaulted

=== Draw ===
First round
1	(South Africa) D Adams (Russia) A Olhovskiy	3	6
(South Korea) E-j Chang (South Korea) C-w Kim	6	7
(United Kingdom) J Bates (Germany) A Mronz	6	6
Q	(Germany) A Finnberg (Germany) M Zoecke	3	2
4	(United States) K Kinnear (Canada) S Lareau	3	6	6
(United States) K Jones (United States) M Keil	6	3	4
WC	(South Korea) H-c Shin (South Korea) Y-i Yoon	6	3	4
(Australia) P Kilderry (Italy) G Pozzi	3	6	6
(United States) M Blackman (United States) L Gloria	6	1	3
(France) S Simian (United States) K Thorne	3	6	6
(United States) R Matuszewski (United States) J Tarango	2	2
3	(New Zealand) B Steven (Australia) S Stolle	6	6
(Australia) N Borwick (United Kingdom) M Petchey	7	4	6
WC	(South Korea) S-h Ji (South Korea) N-h Kim	6	6	3
(Australia) J Morgan (Venezuela) M Ruah	1	3
2	(Sweden) J Björkman (Australia) P Rafter	6	6

Quarterfinals
(South Korea) E-j Chang (South Korea) C-w Kim	5	6	2
(United Kingdom) J Bates (Germany) A Mronz	7	3	6
4	(United States) K Kinnear (Canada) S Lareau	6	6
(Australia) P Kilderry (Italy) G Pozzi	4	4
(France) S Simian (United States) K Thorne	6	6	7
3	(New Zealand) B Steven (Australia) S Stolle	7	2	6
(Australia) N Borwick (United Kingdom) M Petchey	4	4
2	(Sweden) J Björkman (Australia) P Rafter	6	6

Semifinals
(United Kingdom) J Bates (Germany) A Mronz	3	6	4
4	(United States) K Kinnear (Canada) S Lareau	6	3	6
(France) S Simian (United States) K Thorne	6	3	6
2	(Sweden) J Björkman (Australia) P Rafter	4	6	2

Final
4	(United States) K Kinnear (Canada) S Lareau	4	6	5
(France) S Simian (United States) K Thorne	6	3	7
