= 1993 Australian Open – Men's singles qualifying =

Men's singles qualifying
- 1993 Australian Open

Events
Singles	men	women		boys	girls
Doubles	men	women	mixed	boys	girls
WC Singles	men	women	quad
WC Doubles	men	women	quad
Legends	men	women	mixed

Qualification
Singles	men	women
- Australian Open

This article displays the qualifying draw for men's singles at the 1993 Australian Open.

== Seeds ==
1. -
2. (Zimbabwe) Byron Black (qualified)
3. (United States) Tommy Ho (qualifying competition, lucky loser)
4. (Sweden) Mikael Tillström (first round)
5. (South Africa) Gary Muller (qualified)
6. (Spain) Jordi Burillo (first round)
7. (Sweden) Anders Järryd (qualified)
8. (Sweden) Jan Apell (qualified)
9. (Czech Republic) Ctislav Doseděl (first round)
10. (Germany) Alexander Mronz (first round)
11. (Sweden) Lars-Anders Wahlgren (qualified)
12. (United States) Jimmy Arias (first round)
13. (The Bahamas) Roger Smith (first round)
14. (Italy) Cristiano Caratti (qualifying competition, lucky loser)
15. (United States) Kenny Thorne (qualifying competition)
16. (Germany) Jörn Renzenbrink (qualified)
17. (South Africa) Grant Stafford (qualified)
18. (Australia) Carl Limberger (second round)
19. (India) Leander Paes (first round)
20. (United States) Steve Bryan (qualifying competition)
21. (United States) Kent Kinnear (first round)
22. (Netherlands) Fernon Wibier (qualifying competition)
23. (South Africa) Lan Bale (second round)
24. (United States) Chris Garner (qualified)
25. -
26. (Russia) Yevgeny Kafelnikov (first round)
27. (United Kingdom) Chris Bailey (qualified)
28. (Germany) Florian Krumrey (second round)
29. (United Kingdom) Mark Petchey (first round)
30. (Australia) Roger Rasheed (first round)
31. (Czech Republic) Tomáš Anzari (qualifying competition)
32. (The Bahamas) Mark Knowles (second round)
33. (United States) Dave Randall (qualified)

== Qualifiers ==
1. (United States) Dave Randall
2. (Zimbabwe) Byron Black
3. (Australia) Broderick Dyke
4. (South Africa) Mark Kaplan
5. (South Africa) Gary Muller
6. (United Kingdom) Chris Bailey
7. (Sweden) Anders Järryd
8. (Sweden) Jan Apell
9. (United States) Mark Keil
10. (United States) Chris Garner
11. (Sweden) Lars-Anders Wahlgren
12. (United States) Bret Garnett
13. (United States) Kelly Jones
14. (United States) David DiLucia
15. (South Africa) Grant Stafford
16. (Germany) Jörn Renzenbrink

== Lucky losers ==
1. (Italy) Cristiano Caratti
2. (United States) Tommy Ho

== Qualifying draw ==
Key

- Q = Qualifier
- WC = Wild card
- LL = Lucky loser
- Alt = Alternate
- ITF = ITF entry
- PR = Protected ranking
- SR = Special ranking
- SE = Special exempt
- JE = Junior exempt
- JR = Junior Accelerator Programme entrant
- CO = College Accelerator Programme entrant
- NG = Next Gen Accelerator Program entrant
- w/o = Walkover
- r = Retired
- d = Defaulted

=== First qualifier ===
First round
33	(United States) Dave Randall	6	6
(Italy) Ettore Rossetti	2	3
(France) Bertrand Lemercier	4	6	8
(Australia) Peter Tramacchi	6	4	10
(United States) Thomas Burwell	0	4
(United States) Paul Koscielski	6	6
(United States) Louis Gloria	2	1
31	(Czech Republic) Tomáš Anzari	6	6

Second round
33	(United States) Dave Randall	6	3	6
(Australia) Peter Tramacchi	4	6	4
(United States) Paul Koscielski	3	7	4
31	(Czech Republic) Tomáš Anzari	6	6	6

Qualifying competition
33	(United States) Dave Randall	6	6
31	(Czech Republic) Tomáš Anzari	3	1

=== Second qualifier ===
First round
2	(Zimbabwe) Byron Black	6	7
(United States) Mike Bauer	0	6
Alt	(Australia) Alan Ross	3	2
(United States) Donald Johnson	6	6
WC	(Australia) Michael Tebbutt	7	7
(South Africa) John-Laffnie de Jager	6	5
(United States) Tim Donovan	4	2
32	(The Bahamas) Mark Knowles	6	6

Second round
2	(Zimbabwe) Byron Black	7	6
(United States) Donald Johnson	5	3
WC	(Australia) Michael Tebbutt	2	7	6
32	(The Bahamas) Mark Knowles	6	5	1

Qualifying competition
2	(Zimbabwe) Byron Black	7	6
WC	(Australia) Michael Tebbutt	5	3

=== Third qualifier ===
First round
3	(United States) Tommy Ho	6	6
(Japan) Toshitsugu Mori	2	1
(Australia) Steven Baldas	6	4	6
(Australia) Mark Draper	3	6	3
(Sweden) Johan Donar	2^{r}
(United States) Brian Joelson	3
(Australia) Broderick Dyke	6	1	6
29	(United Kingdom) Mark Petchey	0	6	0

Second round
3	(United States) Tommy Ho	6	6
(Australia) Steven Baldas	0	2
(United States) Brian Joelson	6	1
(Australia) Broderick Dyke	7	6

Qualifying competition
3	(United States) Tommy Ho	7	4	4
(Australia) Broderick Dyke	5	6	6

=== Fourth qualifier ===
First round
4	(Sweden) Mikael Tillström	6	1	3
(Sweden) Magnus Norman	4	6	6
(South Africa) Mark Kaplan	6	6
(Australia) Bret Richardson	4	2
(United Kingdom) Neil Broad	6	6
WC	(Australia) Allen Belobrajdic	3	3
(United States) Todd Nelson	3	7	6
30	(Australia) Roger Rasheed	6	5	3

Second round
(Sweden) Magnus Norman	4	2
(South Africa) Mark Kaplan	6	6
(United Kingdom) Neil Broad	4	1
(United States) Todd Nelson	6	6

Qualifying competition
(South Africa) Mark Kaplan	6	2	6
(United States) Todd Nelson	2	6	3

=== Fifth qualifier ===
First round
5	(South Africa) Gary Muller	6	6
(New Zealand) Bruce Derlin	3	4
(Germany) Oliver Gross	4	3
(Australia) Paul Kilderry	6	6
(South Africa) David Nainkin	4	6	5
(United States) Tom Mercer	6	3	7
(France) Grégory Carraz	3	6	4
28	(Germany) Florian Krumrey	6	3	6

Second round
5	(South Africa) Gary Muller	7	6
(Australia) Paul Kilderry	6	4
(United States) Tom Mercer	6	7
28	(Germany) Florian Krumrey	2	5

Qualifying competition
5	(South Africa) Gary Muller	6	6
(United States) Tom Mercer	2	3

=== Sixth qualifier ===
First round
6	(Spain) Jordi Burillo	1	1
(Australia) Andrew Florent	6	6
WC	(Australia) Bradley Sceney	6	4	6
(France) Nicolas Escudé	4	6	2
(Germany) Christian Vinck	2	5
WC	(Australia) Ben Ellwood	6	7
(United States) David Kass	5	4
27	(United Kingdom) Chris Bailey	7	6

Second round
(Australia) Andrew Florent	6	6
WC	(Australia) Bradley Sceney	1	3
WC	(Australia) Ben Ellwood	1	0
27	(United Kingdom) Chris Bailey	6	6

Qualifying competition
(Australia) Andrew Florent	6	6
27	(United Kingdom) Chris Bailey	7	7

=== Seventh qualifier ===
First round
7	(Sweden) Anders Järryd	6	6
(Australia) Stephen Gleeson	0	2
(Sweden) Mårten Renström	6	6
(Morocco) Younes El Aynaoui	4	4
(Japan) Yasufumi Yamamoto	7	6
(Australia) Andrew Kratzmann	5	4
(South Africa) Michael Robertson	6	6
Alt	(Australia) Patrick Flynn	1	4

Second round
7	(Sweden) Anders Järryd	7
(Sweden) Mårten Renström	6^{r}
(Japan) Yasufumi Yamamoto	3	7	7
(South Africa) Michael Robertson	6	5	5

Qualifying competition
7	(Sweden) Anders Järryd	6	6
(Japan) Yasufumi Yamamoto	2	1

=== Eighth qualifier ===
First round
8	(Sweden) Jan Apell	6	6
(Australia) Glen Eaton	1	0
WC	(Australia) Andrew Ilie	4	6	8
(Germany) Jörn Grunewald	6	3	10
(Japan) Daiji Morii	2	0
(United States) Doug Flach	6	6
(Australia) Johan Anderson	6	6
26	(Russia) Yevgeny Kafelnikov	1	3

Second round
8	(Sweden) Jan Apell	6	6
(Germany) Jörn Grunewald	1	1
(United States) Doug Flach	7	7
(Australia) Johan Anderson	6	5

Qualifying competition
8	(Sweden) Jan Apell	6	6
(United States) Doug Flach	3	3

=== Ninth qualifier ===
First round
9	(Czech Republic) Ctislav Doseděl	6	6	4
(South Africa) Ellis Ferreira	7	3	6
(Australia) Joshua Eagle	4	6
(United States) Mark Keil	6	7
(Germany) Peter Moraing	6	6
(Philippines) Roland So	4	4
(Japan) Hidehiko Tanizawa	4	2
23	(South Africa) Lan Bale	6	6

Second round
(South Africa) Ellis Ferreira	3	7	3
(United States) Mark Keil	6	6	6
(Germany) Peter Moraing	6	6
23	(South Africa) Lan Bale	4	3

Qualifying competition
(United States) Mark Keil	6	6
(Germany) Peter Moraing	3	4

=== Tenth qualifier ===
First round
10	(Germany) Alexander Mronz	4	6
(Germany) Stephan Rhode	6	7
(Italy) Corrado Borroni	6	6
WC	(Australia) David Macpherson	4	1
(Australia) Matthew MacMahon	6	6
(United States) Scott Brown	3	0
(Australia) Michael Brown	6	4	3
24	(United States) Chris Garner	4	6	6

Second round
(Germany) Stephan Rhode	6	6
(Italy) Corrado Borroni	4	4
(Australia) Matthew MacMahon	2	1
24	(United States) Chris Garner	6	6

Qualifying competition
(Germany) Stephan Rhode	3	2
24	(United States) Chris Garner	6	6

=== Eleventh qualifier ===
First round
11	(Sweden) Lars-Anders Wahlgren	6	6
(France) Maxime Boyé	3	2
(South Africa) Marius Barnard	6	6
(India) Srinivasan Vasudevan	4	4
(United States) Sven Salumaa	3	6	6
(Australia) Andrew Bates	6	4	0
(United States) Donny Isaak	6	1	6
22	(Netherlands) Fernon Wibier	2	6	8

Second round
11	(Sweden) Lars-Anders Wahlgren	6	2	10
(South Africa) Marius Barnard	3	6	8
(United States) Sven Salumaa	4	4
22	(Netherlands) Fernon Wibier	6	6

Qualifying competition
11	(Sweden) Lars-Anders Wahlgren	6	6
22	(Netherlands) Fernon Wibier	3	1

=== Twelfth qualifier ===
First round
12	(United States) Jimmy Arias	3	7	4
(Australia) Darren Patten	6	5	6
(United States) Alexis Hombrecher	3	1
(United States) Bret Garnett	6	6
(Australia) Mark Kratzmann	6	7
(United States) Brett Hansen-Dent	1	6
(United States) Scott Davis	6	6
21	(United States) Kent Kinnear	4	2

Second round
(Australia) Darren Patten	3	6
(United States) Bret Garnett	6	7
(Australia) Mark Kratzmann	4	6	3
(United States) Scott Davis	6	2	6

Qualifying competition
(United States) Bret Garnett	7	6
(United States) Scott Davis	6	4

=== Thirteenth qualifier ===
First round
13	(The Bahamas) Roger Smith	3	6	3
(United States) Kelly Jones	6	3	6
(Japan) Eduardo Furusho	6	7
(Australia) James Holmes	2	6
(Spain) Juan-Albert Viloca-Puig	1	0
(South Korea) Shin Han-cheol	6	6
(Japan) Hideki Kaneko	1	4
20	(United States) Steve Bryan	6	6

Second round
(United States) Kelly Jones	6	7
(Japan) Eduardo Furusho	3	5
(South Korea) Shin Han-cheol	2	2
20	(United States) Steve Bryan	6	6

Qualifying competition
(United States) Kelly Jones	6	6
20	(United States) Steve Bryan	3	4

=== Fourteenth qualifier ===
First round
14	(Italy) Cristiano Caratti	6	6	6
WC	(Australia) Anastasios Vasiliadis	4	7	1
(South Korea) Kim Bong-soo	6	6
(Australia) Wayne Arthurs	4	4
(Belgium) Libor Pimek	4	6	3
(Netherlands) Hendrik Jan Davids	6	3	6
(United States) David DiLucia	6	7
19	(India) Leander Paes	3	6

Second round
14	(Italy) Cristiano Caratti	6	6	7
(South Korea) Kim Bong-soo	7	3	5
(Netherlands) Hendrik Jan Davids	3	4
(United States) David DiLucia	6	6

Qualifying competition
14	(Italy) Cristiano Caratti	4	3
(United States) David DiLucia	6	6

=== Fifteenth qualifier ===
First round
15	(United States) Kenny Thorne	7	4	6
WC	(Australia) Scott Draper	6	6	4
(United Kingdom) Danny Sapsford	5	6	6
(South Africa) Piet Norval	7	4	3
(Italy) Andrea Gaudenzi	6	7	3
(Kenya) Paul Wekesa	7	5	6
WC	(Australia) Mark Philippoussis	3	1
17	(South Africa) Grant Stafford	6	6

Second round
15	(United States) Kenny Thorne	7	6
(United Kingdom) Danny Sapsford	5	3
(Kenya) Paul Wekesa	6	3
17	(South Africa) Grant Stafford	7	6

Qualifying competition
15	(United States) Kenny Thorne	1	6	5
17	(South Africa) Grant Stafford	6	1	7

=== Sixteenth qualifier ===
First round
16	(Germany) Jörn Renzenbrink	4	6	7
(United States) Brian Dunn	6	0	5
(Mexico) Agustín Moreno	6	0
Alt	(United States) Steve DeVries	7	6
(United States) Brian Devening	6	4	6
(Australia) Brent Larkham	4	6	2
(United States) Al Parker	2	2
18	(Australia) Carl Limberger	6	6

Second round
16	(Germany) Jörn Renzenbrink	7	7
Alt	(United States) Steve DeVries	6	5
(United States) Brian Devening	4	7	7
18	(Australia) Carl Limberger	6	6	5

Qualifying competition
16	(Germany) Jörn Renzenbrink	6	1	10
(United States) Brian Devening	4	6	8
