= 1994 KAL Cup Korea Open =

- Date: 18–25 April
- Edition: 8th
- Category: World Series
- Draw: 32S / 16D
- Prize money: $188,750
- Surface: Hard / outdoor
- Location: Seoul, South Korea

Champions

Singles
- (United Kingdom) Jeremy Bates

Doubles
- (France) Stéphane Simian / (United States) Kenny Thorne
← 1993 ·	Seoul Open	· 1995 →

The 1994 KAL Cup Korea Open was a men's tennis tournament played on outdoor hard courts that was part of the World Series tier of the 1994 ATP Tour. It was the eighth edition of the tournament and was played at Seoul in South Korea from 18 April through 25 April 1994. Unseeded Jeremy Bates won the singles title.

== Finals ==
=== Singles ===
(United Kingdom) Jeremy Bates defeated (Germany) Jörn Renzenbrink 6–4, 6–7^{(6–8)}, 6–3

- It was Bates' only singles title of his career.

=== Doubles ===
(France) Stéphane Simian / (United States) Kenny Thorne defeated (United States) Kent Kinnear / (Canada) Sébastien Lareau 6–4, 3–6, 7–5

- It was Simian's 2nd title of the year and the 2nd of his career. It was Thorne's 1st title of the year and the 1st of his career.
