= 1993 US Open – Men's singles =

Men's tennis tournament

Men's singles
- 1993 US Open

Final
- Champion: (United States) Pete Sampras
- Runner-up: (France) Cédric Pioline
- Score: 6–4, 6–4, 6–3

Details
- Draw: 128
- Seeds: 16

Events
Singles	men	women		boys	girls
Doubles	men	women	mixed	boys	girls
WC Singles	men	women	quad
WC Doubles	men	women	quad
Legends	men	women	mixed
- US Open

Pete Sampras defeated Cédric Pioline in the final, 6–4, 6–4, 6–3 to win the men's singles tennis title at the 1993 US Open. It was his second US Open title and third major title overall.

Stefan Edberg was the two-time defending champion, but lost in the second round to Karel Nováček.

Mats Wilander played his first major since the 1991 French Open; he was defeated by Pioline in the third round.

== Seeds ==
The seeded players are listed below. Pete Sampras is the champion; others show the round in which they were eliminated.

1. (United States) Jim Courier (fourth round)
2. (United States) Pete Sampras (champion)
3. (Sweden) Stefan Edberg (second round)
4. (Germany) Boris Becker (fourth round)
5. (Spain) Sergi Bruguera (first round)
6. (Germany) Michael Stich (first round)
7. (United States) Michael Chang (quarterfinalist)
8. (Ukraine) Andrei Medvedev (quarterfinalist)
9. (Czech Republic) Petr Korda (first round)
10. (Netherlands) Richard Krajicek (fourth round)
11. (Croatia) Goran Ivanišević (second round)
12. (Austria) Thomas Muster (quarterfinalist)
13. (United States) Ivan Lendl (first round)
14. (Russia) Alexander Volkov (semifinalist)
15. (France) Cédric Pioline (finalist)
16. (United States) Andre Agassi (first round)

== Draw ==
Key

- Q = Qualifier
- WC = Wild card
- LL = Lucky loser
- Alt = Alternate
- ITF = ITF entry
- PR = Protected ranking
- SR = Special ranking
- SE = Special exempt
- JE = Junior exempt
- JR = Junior Accelerator Programme entrant
- CO = College Accelerator Programme entrant
- NG = Next Gen Accelerator Program entrant
- w/o = Walkover
- r = Retired
- d = Defaulted

=== Final eight ===
Quarterfinals
15	(France) Cédric Pioline	6	6	3	6
8	(Ukraine) Andrei Medvedev	3	1	6	2
(Sweden) Magnus Larsson	2	5	5
(Australia) Wally Masur	6	7	7
12	(Austria) Thomas Muster	6^{6}	3	6	6	5
14	(Russia) Alexander Volkov	7^{8}	6	3	2	7
7	(United States) Michael Chang	7^{7}	6^{2}	1	1
2	(United States) Pete Sampras	6^{0}	7^{7}	6	6

Semifinals
15	(France) Cédric Pioline	6	6^{3}	7^{7}	6
(Australia) Wally Masur	1	7^{7}	6^{2}	1
14	(Russia) Alexander Volkov	4	3	2
2	(United States) Pete Sampras	6	6	6

Final
15	(France) Cédric Pioline	4	4	3
2	(United States) Pete Sampras	6	6	6

=== Section 1 ===
First round
1	(United States) J Courier	6	6	6
(Spain) M A Gorriz	1	3	3
Q	(South Africa) D Nainkin	6	1	4	3
Q	(United States) M Joyce	4	6	6	6
LL	(Australia) P Rafter	6	3	2	1
WC	(United States) D Flach	3	6	6	6
(United States) M Washington	4	6	3	6	7
(Argentina) A Mancini	6	3	6	1	5
WC	(Sweden) M Wilander	7	7^{7}	7^{18}
(Brazil) J Oncins	5	6^{2}	6^{16}
(Sweden) M Pernfors	6	6	7^{7}
(Denmark) K Carlsen	4	4	6^{4}
(United States) T Ho	6	6^{5}	4	2
(United States) J Palmer	4	7^{7}	6	6
(Germany) D Prinosil	7^{8}	5	4	6	1
15	(France) C Pioline	6^{6}	7	6	3	6

Second round
1	(United States) J Courier	6	6	6
Q	(United States) M Joyce	1	2	2
WC	(United States) D Flach	5	3	2
(United States) M Washington	7	6	6
WC	(Sweden) M Wilander	7^{7}	3	1	7^{8}	6
(Sweden) M Pernfors	6^{3}	6	6	6^{6}	4
(United States) J Palmer	4	6	7	5	1
15	(France) C Pioline	6	3	5	7	6

Third round
1	(United States) J Courier	6	6	6
(United States) M Washington	4	4	2
WC	(Sweden) M Wilander	4	4	4
15	(France) C Pioline	6	6	6

Fourth round
1	(United States) J Courier	5	7^{7}	4	4
15	(France) C Pioline	7	6^{4}	6	6

=== Section 2 ===
First round
10	(Netherlands) R Krajicek	6	6	6
(Czech Republic) D Rikl	3	3	1
(Spain) A Berasategui	4	7	4	6	6
WC	(United States) V Spadea	6	5	6	3	2
(Spain) J Burillo	7	6	1	3	2
(United States) T Martin	5	4	6	6	6
Q	(United States) P Williamson	6^{6}	2	2
(Haiti) R Agénor	7^{8}	6	6
(Italy) R Furlan	6	4	6	6
Q	(United States) I Baron	0	6	4	0
WC	(United States) P Goldstein	2	2	4
(Germany) K Braasch	6	6	6
(United States) R Reneberg	6
(Sweden) C Bergström	4	r
(Brazil) F Meligeni	2	2	6	1
8	(Ukraine) A Medvedev	6	6	4	6

Second round
10	(Netherlands) R Krajicek	6	6	6
(Spain) A Berasategui	1	2	4
(United States) T Martin	6	4
(Haiti) R Agénor	3	1	r
(Italy) R Furlan	4	6	4	6	3
(Germany) K Braasch	6	0	6	3	6
(United States) R Reneberg	6	6^{5}	4	3
8	(Ukraine) A Medvedev	4	7^{7}	6	6

Third round
10	(Netherlands) R Krajicek	6^{4}	4	7^{11}	6	6
(United States) T Martin	7^{7}	6	6^{9}	4	4
(Germany) K Braasch	1	4	6^{4}
8	(Ukraine) A Medvedev	6	6	7^{7}

Fourth round
10	(Netherlands) R Krajicek	4	6	1	6^{4}
8	(Ukraine) A Medvedev	6	3	6	7^{7}

=== Section 3 ===
First round
4	(Germany) B Becker	3	6^{8}	7	6	6
(Russia) A Cherkasov	6	7^{10}	5	4	4
(Australia) M Woodforde	1	2	6	2
(Switzerland) J Hlasek	6	6	4	6
(Netherlands) J Eltingh	6	6	6
(France) H Leconte	4	2	4
(Chile) S Cortés	7^{7}	6^{8}	6	6
(United States) D Rostagno	6^{5}	7^{10}	1	1
WC	(United States) K Thorne	1	7^{7}	6	r
(Australia) R Fromberg	6	6^{5}	6
(Australia) T Woodbridge	5	6	6	7
(Switzerland) M Rosset	7	0	1	5
(Sweden) M Larsson	6	6	7^{7}
(France) G Raoux	2	4	6^{4}
Q	(Australia) N Borwick	4	6	3
13	(United States) I Lendl	6	4	1	r

Second round
4	(Germany) B Becker	6	6	6
(Switzerland) J Hlasek	2	2	4
(Netherlands) J Eltingh	6	4	6^{2}	4
(Chile) S Cortés	4	6	7^{7}	6
(Australia) R Fromberg	5	2	7^{7}	6	6
(Australia) T Woodbridge	7	6	6^{2}	3	0
(Sweden) M Larsson	6	6	6
Q	(Australia) N Borwick	4	4	4

Third round
4	(Germany) B Becker	6	6	6
(Chile) S Cortés	4	4	3
(Australia) R Fromberg	2	5	6^{5}
(Sweden) M Larsson	6	7	7^{7}

Fourth round
4	(Germany) B Becker	2	3	6	5
(Sweden) M Larsson	6	6	3	7

=== Section 4 ===
First round
11	(Croatia) G Ivanišević	6	7^{7}	7^{20}
Q	(Canada) D Nestor	4	6^{5}	6^{18}
(Spain) C Costa	6	6	6
(France) R Gilbert	3	2	4
(Australia) J Morgan	6	6	3	6
(Spain) F Clavet	3	4	6	3
(United States) J Tarango	3	1	r
(Portugal) J Cunha-Silva	6	6
(United States) B Shelton	4	6^{4}	6	1
(Germany) P Kühnen	6	7^{7}	4	6
(Spain) T Carbonell	3	3	6	3
(Australia) W Masur	6	6	1	6
(Spain) J F Altur	3	6	3	6^{3}
(Brazil) L Mattar	6	3	6	7^{7}
(Spain) J Sánchez	7^{7}	6	6
5	(Spain) S Bruguera	6^{5}	3	4

Second round
11	(Croatia) G Ivanišević	3	6^{4}	6^{5}
(Spain) C Costa	6	7^{7}	7^{7}
(Australia) J Morgan	6	6	2	7
(Portugal) J Cunha-Silva	3	3	6	5
(Germany) P Kühnen	4	4	7	6^{7}
(Australia) W Masur	6	6	5	7^{9}
(Brazil) L Mattar	5	1	7^{7}	6	3
(Spain) J Sánchez	7	6	6^{4}	4	6

Third round
(Spain) C Costa	6^{7}	6^{1}	6^{2}
(Australia) J Morgan	7^{9}	7^{7}	7^{7}
(Australia) W Masur	6	7	7^{7}
(Spain) J Sánchez	1	5	6^{3}

Fourth round
(Australia) J Morgan	6	6	3	4	5
(Australia) W Masur	3	4	6	6	7

=== Section 5 ===
First round
6	(Germany) M Stich	3	6^{8}	6	3
(Sweden) H Holm	6	7^{10}	3	6
Q	(United States) R Weiss	7^{12}	4	6	3	6^{1}
(Netherlands) J Siemerink	6^{10}	6	4	6	7^{7}
(United States) B Gilbert	6	6	5	7^{7}
(Sweden) M Gustafsson	3	3	7	6^{2}
Q	(Ukraine) D Poliakov	6	6	6
Q	(United States) B Garnett	3	2	2
(Netherlands) P Haarhuis	0	7^{10}	6	6
(United States) D Wheaton	6	6^{8}	4	4
(South Africa) M Ondruska	7^{7}	6	2	1	2
(United States) P McEnroe	6^{4}	3	6	6	6
(Italy) G Pozzi	6	6^{7}	4	1
(United States) A Krickstein	3	7^{9}	6	6
(Spain) À Corretja	4	4	3
12	(Austria) T Muster	6	6	6

Second round
(Sweden) H Holm	3	6	6	6
(Netherlands) J Siemerink	6	3	4	4
(United States) B Gilbert	6	2	6	6
Q	(Ukraine) D Poliakov	3	6	2	4
(Netherlands) P Haarhuis	4	3	7^{7}	3
(United States) P McEnroe	6	6	6^{5}	6
(United States) A Krickstein	4	0	3
12	(Austria) T Muster	6	6	6

Third round
(Sweden) H Holm	2	3	2
(United States) B Gilbert	6	6	6
(United States) P McEnroe	4	4	4
12	(Austria) T Muster	6	6	6

Fourth round
(United States) B Gilbert	2	5	7^{7}	2
12	(Austria) T Muster	6	7	6^{5}	6

=== Section 6 ===
First round
14	(Russia) A Volkov	1	6	6	6^{7}	6
(United States) J Stark	6	3	4	7^{9}	3
(United States) A O'Brien	3	7	7	1	4
Q	(Zimbabwe) K Ullyett	6	5	5	6	6
(Sweden) J Björkman	6	6	6
(France) S Simian	4	3	3
(Israel) A Mansdorf	2	6^{6}	6	1
(South Africa) G Stafford	6	7^{8}	2	0	r
WC	(United States) C Woodruff	3	4	6	4
(United States) C Adams	6	6	0	6
(Croatia) G Prpić	1	2	6^{5}
(Sweden) J Svensson	6	6	7^{7}
Q	(Australia) M Tebbutt	3	2	3
(Czech Republic) K Nováček	6	6	6
(France) O Delaître	2	6	6^{7}	7	3
3	(Sweden) S Edberg	6	0	7^{9}	5	6

Second round
14	(Russia) A Volkov	6^{3}	7^{7}	6	6
Q	(Zimbabwe) K Ullyett	7^{7}	6^{4}	1	3
(Sweden) J Björkman	3	3	5
(Israel) A Mansdorf	6	6	7
(United States) C Adams	1	6	6	6
(Sweden) J Svensson	6	0	2	1
(Czech Republic) K Nováček	7^{7}	6	4	6
3	(Sweden) S Edberg	6^{3}	4	6	4

Third round
14	(Russia) A Volkov	2	7	6	6
(Israel) A Mansdorf	6	5	4	2
(United States) C Adams	7	7	1	6
(Czech Republic) K Nováček	5	5	6	4

Fourth round
14	(Russia) A Volkov	6	7^{7}	6
(United States) C Adams	2	6^{2}	1

=== Section 7 ===
First round
7	(United States) M Chang	6	7	6
WC	(United States) S Cannon	1	5	2
(Venezuela) N Pereira	6	6	4	6
Q	(Italy) C Caratti	2	4	6	3
(Germany) M Zoecke	6^{6}	4	5
(Sweden) N Kulti	7^{8}	6	7
(Germany) B Karbacher	4	6	1	7^{7}	6
(Spain) E Sánchez	6	1	6	6^{5}	2
WC	(United States) D Witt	2	7^{7}	2	3
(Germany) M-K Goellner	6	6^{5}	6	6
(Peru) J Yzaga	6^{3}	6	6	6
(Russia) A Chesnokov	7^{7}	3	2	1
(Czech Republic) M Damm	6	2	6	6
Q	(France) J-P Fleurian	2	6	3	4
(South Africa) W Ferreira	7^{7}	4	7^{9}	3	6
9	(Czech Republic) P Korda	6^{2}	6	6^{7}	6	2

Second round
7	(United States) M Chang	6	6	4	6
(Venezuela) N Pereira	1	2	6	3
(Sweden) N Kulti	3	0	2
(Germany) B Karbacher	6	6	6
(Germany) M-K Goellner	4	6	6	7^{8}
(Peru) J Yzaga	6	4	4	6^{6}
(Czech Republic) M Damm	4	4	7	6	3
(South Africa) W Ferreira	6	6	5	3	6

Third round
7	(United States) M Chang	4	6	6	6
(Germany) B Karbacher	6	4	3	4
(Germany) M-K Goellner	4	7^{7}	6	4	3
(South Africa) W Ferreira	6	6^{1}	3	6	6

Fourth round
7	(United States) M Chang	6	6	6
(South Africa) W Ferreira	4	3	4

=== Section 8 ===
First round
16	(United States) A Agassi	4	4	6	7^{7}	2
(Sweden) T Enqvist	6	6	3	6^{3}	6
Q	(South Africa) L Bale	6	6	6
(Germany) C Arriens	1	0	2
Q	(Japan) S Matsuoka	6	6	6
(Russia) A Olhovskiy	2	3	2
(Zimbabwe) B Black	6	6	6
Q	(Norway) B-O Pedersen	3	3	2
(New Zealand) B Steven	6	1	3	1
(France) A Boetsch	1	6	6	6
(Australia) J Stoltenberg	6	3	4	2
(Germany) C-U Steeb	1	6	6	6
(Czech Republic) S Doseděl	6	6^{7}	7^{7}	4	1
(Czech Republic) D Vacek	2	7^{9}	6^{0}	6	6
(France) F Santoro	3	1	2
2	(United States) P Sampras	6	6	6

Second round
(Sweden) T Enqvist	6	4	6	6
Q	(South Africa) L Bale	2	6	3	3
Q	(Japan) S Matsuoka	6	2	5	6^{5}
(Zimbabwe) B Black	3	6	7	7^{7}
(France) A Boetsch	6	6	1
(Germany) C-U Steeb	4	4	0	r
(Czech Republic) D Vacek	4	7	2	6^{3}
2	(United States) P Sampras	6	5	6	7^{7}

Third round
(Sweden) T Enqvist	6	6	6
(Zimbabwe) B Black	3	1	1
(France) A Boetsch	4	3	1
2	(United States) P Sampras	6	6	6

Fourth round
(Sweden) T Enqvist	4	4	6^{4}
2	(United States) P Sampras	6	6	7^{7}

Preceded by 1993 Wimbledon Championships – Men's singles	Grand Slam men's singles	Succeeded by 1994 Australian Open – Men's singles
