= 1993 KAL Cup Korea Open =

- Date: 19–26 April
- Edition: 7th
- Category: World Series
- Draw: 32S / 16D
- Prize money: $175,000
- Surface: Hard / outdoor
- Location: Seoul, South Korea

Champions

Singles
- (United States) Chuck Adams

Doubles
- (Sweden) Jan Apell / (Sweden) Peter Nyborg
← 1992 ·	KAL Cup Korea Open	· 1994 →

The 1993 KAL Cup Korea Open was a men's tennis tournament played on outdoor hard courts that was part of the World Series of the 1993 ATP Tour. It was the seventh edition of the tournament and was played in Seoul in South Korea from 19 April through 26 April 1993. Eighth-seeded Chuck Adams won the singles title.

== Finals ==
=== Singles ===
(United States) Chuck Adams defeated (Australia) Todd Woodbridge 6–4, 6–4

- It was Adams' only title of the year and the 1st of his career.

=== Doubles ===
(Sweden) Jan Apell / (Sweden) Peter Nyborg defeated (United Kingdom) Neil Broad / (South Africa) Gary Muller 5–7, 7–6, 6–2

- It was Apell's only title of the year and the 1st of his career. It was Nyborg's only title of the year and the 1st of his career.
