= 1993 Wimbledon Championships – Men's singles =

Tennis tournament

Men's singles
- 1993 Wimbledon Championships

Final
- Champion: (United States) Pete Sampras
- Runner-up: (United States) Jim Courier
- Score: 7–6^{(7–3)}, 7–6^{(8–6)}, 3–6, 6–3

Details
- Draw: 128 (16Q / 8WC)
- Seeds: 16

Events
| Singles | men | women | | boys | girls |
| Doubles | men | women | mixed | boys | girls |
| WC Singles | men | women | quad |
| WC Doubles | men | women | quad |
| Legends | men | women | seniors |
- Wimbledon Championships

Pete Sampras defeated Jim Courier in the final, 7–6^{(7–3)}, 7–6^{(8–6)}, 3–6, 6–3 to win the gentlemen's singles tennis title at the 1993 Wimbledon Championships. It was his second major title and the first of seven Wimbledon men's singles titles, an all-time record shared with William Renshaw (later surpassed by Roger Federer in 2017).

Andre Agassi was the defending champion, but was defeated in the quarterfinals by Sampras.

This marked Ivan Lendl's last Wimbledon appearance; he lost in the second round. He was a runner-up in two Wimbledon finals. This was the only major he did not win in his career.

== Seeds ==
1. (United States) Pete Sampras (champion)
2. (Sweden) Stefan Edberg (semifinals)
3. (United States) Jim Courier (final)
4. (Germany) Boris Becker (semifinals)
5. (Croatia) Goran Ivanišević (third round)
6. (Germany) Michael Stich (quarterfinals)
7. (United States) Ivan Lendl (second round)
8. (United States) Andre Agassi (quarterfinals)
9. (Netherlands) Richard Krajicek (fourth round)
10. (Ukraine) Andrei Medvedev (second round)
11. (Czech Republic) Petr Korda (fourth round)
12. (United States) Michael Chang (third round)
13. (South Africa) Wayne Ferreira (fourth round)
14. (United States) MaliVai Washington (second round)
15. (Czech Republic) Karel Nováček (first round)
16. (Austria) Thomas Muster (first round)

Click on the seed number of a player to go to their draw section.

== Draw ==
Key

- Q = Qualifier
- WC = Wild card
- LL = Lucky loser
- Alt = Alternate
- ITF = ITF entry
- PR = Protected ranking
- SR = Special ranking
- SE = Special exempt
- JE = Junior exempt
- JR = Junior Accelerator Programme entrant
- CO = College Accelerator Programme entrant
- NG = Next Gen Accelerator Program entrant
- w/o = Walkover
- r = Retired
- d = Defaulted

=== Finals ===
Quarterfinals
1 | (United States) Pete Sampras | 6 | 6 | 3 | 3 | 6
8 | (United States) Andre Agassi | 2 | 2 | 6 | 6 | 4
4 | (Germany) Boris Becker | 7 | 6^{5} | 6^{5} | 6 | 6
6 | (Germany) Michael Stich | 5 | 7^{7} | 7^{7} | 2 | 4
(United States) Todd Martin | 2 | 6^{5} | 3
3 | (United States) Jim Courier | 6 | 7^{7} | 6
(France) Cédric Pioline | 5 | 5 | 3
2 | (Sweden) Stefan Edberg | 7 | 7 | 6

Semifinals
1 | (United States) Pete Sampras | 7^{7} | 6 | 6
4 | (Germany) Boris Becker | 6^{5} | 4 | 4
3 | (United States) Jim Courier | 4 | 6 | 6 | 6
2 | (Sweden) Stefan Edberg | 6 | 4 | 2 | 4

Final
1 | (United States) Pete Sampras | 7^{7} | 7^{8} | 3 | 6
3 | (United States) Jim Courier | 6^{3} | 6^{6} | 6 | 3

=== Top half ===
==== Section 1 ====
First round
1 | (United States) P Sampras | 6^{10} | 6 | 7^{7} | 6
(Australia) N Borwick | 7^{12} | 3 | 6^{3} | 3
(Russia) A Chesnokov | 3 | 4 | 6 | 4
(Australia) J Morgan | 6 | 6 | 4 | 6
(Zimbabwe) B Black | 6 | 6^{7} | 6 | 6
(United States) R Weiss | 2 | 7^{9} | 1 | 1
(United States) T Ho | 6 | 3 | 4 | 2
Q | (Australia) P Kilderry | 4 | 6 | 6 | 6
(South Africa) G Stafford | 5 | 5 | 6 | 6^{4}
(United States) J Palmer | 7 | 7 | 4 | 7^{7}
Q | (South Africa) D Nainkin | 4 | 2 | 6^{5}
(Russia) A Olhovskiy | 6 | 6 | 7^{7}
(Sweden) T Enqvist | 6 | 3 | 2 | 6 | 3
WC | (United Kingdom) A Foster | 4 | 6 | 6 | 3 | 6
(Mexico) L Herrera | 4 | 4 | 6 | 6 | 6
15 | (Czech Republic) K Nováček | 6 | 6 | 3 | 3 | 3

Second round
1 | (United States) P Sampras | 6 | 7^{7} | 6
(Australia) J Morgan | 4 | 6^{5} | 4
(Zimbabwe) B Black | 7 | 6 | 6
Q | (Australia) P Kilderry | 5 | 0 | 3
(United States) J Palmer | 6^{5} | 3 | 2
(Russia) A Olhovskiy | 7^{7} | 6 | 6
WC | (United Kingdom) A Foster | 6 | 6 | 6
(Mexico) L Herrera | 4 | 3 | 4

Third round
1 | (United States) P Sampras | 6 | 6 | 6
(Zimbabwe) B Black | 4 | 1 | 1
(Russia) A Olhovskiy | 3 | 5^{r}
WC | (United Kingdom) A Foster | 6 | 6

Fourth round
1 | (United States) P Sampras | 6 | 6 | 7^{8}
WC | (United Kingdom) A Foster | 1 | 2 | 6^{6}

==== Section 2 ====
First round
9 | (Netherlands) R Krajicek | 6 | 6 | 6
(Sweden) N Kulti | 4 | 3 | 4
(Netherlands) J Eltingh | 6 | 6 | 3 | 4 | 6
(Switzerland) M Rosset | 2 | 3 | 6 | 6 | 3
(United States) R Reneberg | 6 | 5 | 6 | 6^{4} | 3
(France) S Simian | 3 | 7 | 4 | 7^{7} | 6
Q | (Italy) L Tieleman | 6 | 6 | 7
(Austria) G Schaller | 3 | 4 | 5
Q | (United States) T Nelson | 6 | 6 | 6^{5} | 4 | 6
(Sweden) L Jönsson | 3 | 4 | 7^{7} | 6 | 3
Q | (Australia) S Youl | 3 | 3 | 4
Q | (Australia) P Rafter | 6 | 6 | 6
WC | (United Kingdom) R Matheson | 7 | 6^{5} | 3 | 2
(Portugal) J Cunha e Silva | 5 | 7^{7} | 6 | 6
(Germany) B Karbacher | 5 | 4 | 0
8 | (United States) A Agassi | 7 | 6 | 6

Second round
9 | (Netherlands) R Krajicek | 6 | 6 | 6
(Netherlands) J Eltingh | 4 | 4 | 4
(France) S Simian | 3 | 4 | 6 | 4
Q | (Italy) L Tieleman | 6 | 6 | 3 | 6
Q | (United States) T Nelson | 6^{4} | 4 | 2
Q | (Australia) P Rafter | 7^{7} | 6 | 6
(Portugal) J Cunha e Silva | 7 | 3 | 2 | 0
8 | (United States) A Agassi | 5 | 6 | 6 | 6

Third round
9 | (Netherlands) R Krajicek | 6 | 7 | 5 | 6
Q | (Italy) L Tieleman | 2 | 5 | 7 | 2
Q | (Australia) P Rafter | 1 | 7^{7} | 0 | 3
8 | (United States) A Agassi | 6 | 6^{5} | 6 | 6

Fourth round
9 | (Netherlands) R Krajicek | 5 | 6^{7} | 6^{8}
8 | (United States) A Agassi | 7 | 7^{9} | 7^{10}

==== Section 3 ====
First round
4 | (Germany) B Becker | 4 | 6 | 6 | 6
(Germany) M-K Goellner | 6 | 3 | 2 | 4
(Russia) A Volkov | 6 | 6 | 6
(Sweden) A Järryd | 4 | 2 | 2
Q | (United States) M Keil | 4 | 7^{10} | 1 | 1
WC | (United Kingdom) M Petchey | 6 | 6^{8} | 6 | 6
(Switzerland) J Hlasek | 7^{7} | 6 | 6^{6} | 7^{7}
(Italy) D Nargiso | 6^{4} | 2 | 7^{8} | 6^{5}
(Austria) A Antonitsch | 6^{3} | 3 | 6^{3}
(Germany) D Prinosil | 7^{7} | 6 | 7^{7}
(Uruguay) D Pérez | 4 | 4 | 4
(France) H Leconte | 6 | 6 | 6
(United States) A Krickstein | 6 | 7^{7} | 6
(United States) A O'Brien | 2 | 6^{4} | 3
(France) G Raoux | 6 | 1 | 6 | 2 | 3
14 | (United States) M Washington | 4 | 6 | 1 | 6 | 6

Second round
4 | (Germany) B Becker | 7^{7} | 6 | 6
(Russia) A Volkov | 6^{3} | 1 | 3
WC | (United Kingdom) M Petchey | 6^{3} | 6 | 7^{7} | 2 | 8
(Switzerland) J Hlasek | 7^{7} | 4 | 6^{3} | 6 | 10
(Germany) D Prinosil | 4 | 4 | 4
(France) H Leconte | 6 | 6 | 6
(United States) A Krickstein | 6^{10} | 6 | 6 | 7^{7}
14 | (United States) M Washington | 7^{12} | 4 | 0 | 6^{5}

Third round
4 | (Germany) B Becker | 6 | 3 | 6 | 6
(Switzerland) J Hlasek | 3 | 6 | 2 | 3
(France) H Leconte | 7^{8} | 6 | 6
(United States) A Krickstein | 6^{6} | 3 | 2

Fourth round
4 | (Germany) B Becker | 6 | 6 | 3 | 6
(France) H Leconte | 4 | 4 | 6 | 3

==== Section 4 ====
First round
11 | (Czech Republic) P Korda | 6 | 6 | 6
(Czech Republic) M Střelba | 1 | 2 | 1
(United States) B Gilbert | 1 | 6 | 6 | 6
(Sweden) C Bergström | 6 | 3 | 0 | 1
(South Africa) M Ondruska | 6 | 6 | 6
(United States) J Tarango | 1 | 4 | 3
(United States) D Rostagno | 6 | 1 | 7 | 6
Q | (Australia) G Doyle | 4 | 6 | 5 | 2
(South Africa) C van Rensburg | 6 | 2
(Germany) C-U Steeb | 4 | 0^{r}
(Germany) K Braasch | 6^{5} | 6 | 3 | 6 | 4
WC | (United Kingdom) M Maclagan | 7^{7} | 3 | 6 | 3 | 6
(Australia) S Stolle | 6 | 7^{7} | 6
(Spain) JF Altur | 4 | 6^{3} | 4
(Netherlands) J Siemerink | 2 | 6^{5} | 1
6 | (Germany) M Stich | 6 | 7^{7} | 6

Second round
11 | (Czech Republic) P Korda | 3 | 6 | 6 | 6
(United States) B Gilbert | 6 | 3 | 3 | 2
(South Africa) M Ondruska | 2 | 6 | 6 | 4 | 5
(United States) D Rostagno | 6 | 2 | 2 | 6 | 7
(South Africa) C van Rensburg | 6^{3} | 6 | 6 | 6
WC | (United Kingdom) M Maclagan | 7^{7} | 4 | 2 | 2
(Australia) S Stolle | 6 | 1 | 5 | 4
6 | (Germany) M Stich | 4 | 6 | 7 | 6

Third round
11 | (Czech Republic) P Korda | 6 | 6 | 6
(United States) D Rostagno | 3 | 4 | 4
(South Africa) C van Rensburg | 3 | 4 | 4
6 | (Germany) M Stich | 6 | 6 | 6

Fourth round
11 | (Czech Republic) P Korda | 6^{4} | 4 | 6^{3}
6 | (Germany) M Stich | 7^{7} | 6 | 7^{7}

=== Bottom half ===
==== Section 5 ====
First round
5 | (Croatia) G Ivanišević | 6 | 5 | 5 | 7^{7} | 6
(United States) J Stark | 4 | 7 | 7 | 6^{5} | 4
WC | (United Kingdom) C Bailey | 7 | 7 | 7
(United States) P McEnroe | 5 | 5 | 5
(Czech Republic) C Doseděl | 3 | 2 | 3
(Spain) M Górriz | 6 | 6 | 6
(United States) T Martin | 7^{7} | 7^{9} | 6^{6} | 6
(France) R Gilbert | 6^{3} | 6^{7} | 7^{8} | 4
Q | (United States) S Bryan | 7^{7} | 4 | 3 | 6^{4}
(United States) B Shelton | 6^{5} | 6 | 6 | 7^{7}
(Venezuela) N Pereira | 6^{3} | 6 | 4 | 3
(United States) D Wheaton | 7^{7} | 4 | 6 | 6
(Australia) T Woodbridge | 6 | 6^{9} | 0
(Argentina) H de la Peña | 2 | 7^{11} | 0^{r}
(Netherlands) P Haarhuis | 2 | 2 | 6 | 7^{7} | 4
12 | (United States) M Chang | 6 | 6 | 4 | 6^{5} | 6

Second round
5 | (Croatia) G Ivanišević | 5 | 7^{7} | 6^{3} | 6 | 9
WC | (United Kingdom) C Bailey | 7 | 6^{3} | 7^{7} | 4 | 7
(Spain) M Górriz | 4 | 2 | 4
(United States) T Martin | 6 | 6 | 6
(United States) B Shelton | 6^{2} | 3 | 4
(United States) D Wheaton | 7^{7} | 6 | 6
(Australia) T Woodbridge | 7^{7} | 3 | 4 | 6 | 4
12 | (United States) M Chang | 6^{2} | 6 | 6 | 3 | 6

Third round
5 | (Croatia) G Ivanišević | 6 | 6^{3} | 7^{7} | 5 | 0
(United States) T Martin | 2 | 7^{7} | 6^{4} | 7 | 6
(United States) D Wheaton | 6 | 6 | 5 | 4 | 6
12 | (United States) M Chang | 4 | 4 | 7 | 6 | 4

Fourth round
(United States) T Martin | 6 | 5 | 5 | 7 | 6
(United States) D Wheaton | 4 | 7 | 7 | 5 | 3

==== Section 6 ====
First round
13 | (South Africa) W Ferreira | 6 | 6 | 6
(Argentina) R Azar | 2 | 1 | 4
(Spain) C Costa | 6 | 4 | 6 | 6
Q | (Netherlands) F Wibier | 4 | 6 | 4 | 4
(Australia) M Woodforde | 6 | 2 | 6 | 6
(Japan) S Matsuoka | 4 | 6 | 4 | 3
(Sweden) H Holm | 6 | 6 | 6
(Australia) R Fromberg | 2 | 3 | 2
(Germany) P Kühnen | 0 | 6 | 5 | 3
(Sweden) M Larsson | 6 | 3 | 7 | 6
(Czech Republic) D Vacek | 6^{5} | 2 | 4
(Australia) J Stoltenberg | 7^{7} | 6 | 6
(Haiti) R Agénor | 6 | 4 | 7 | 6
(Spain) T Carbonell | 4 | 6 | 5 | 2
(Italy) G Pozzi | 0 | 5 | 4
3 | (United States) J Courier | 6 | 7 | 6

Second round
13 | (South Africa) W Ferreira | 2 | 6 | 6^{4} | 7^{7} | 8
(Spain) C Costa | 6 | 2 | 7^{7} | 6^{4} | 6
(Australia) M Woodforde | 3 | 2 | 6 | 6^{4}
(Sweden) H Holm | 6 | 6 | 3 | 7^{7}
(Sweden) M Larsson | 3 | 6 | 4 | 3
(Australia) J Stoltenberg | 6 | 3 | 6 | 6
(Haiti) R Agénor | 5 | 1 | 6^{1}
3 | (United States) J Courier | 7 | 6 | 7^{7}

Third round
13 | (South Africa) W Ferreira | 6 | 6 | 7^{7}
(Sweden) H Holm | 4 | 3 | 6^{2}
(Australia) J Stoltenberg | 4 | 6^{9} | 6 | 4
3 | (United States) J Courier | 6 | 7^{11} | 3 | 6

Fourth round
13 | (South Africa) W Ferreira | 6 | 6^{8} | 5 | 4
3 | (United States) J Courier | 4 | 7^{10} | 7 | 6

==== Section 7 ====
First round
7 | (United States) I Lendl | 6^{8} | 6 | 6 | 6
Q | (United States) B Devening | 7^{10} | 4 | 1 | 3
WC | (United Kingdom) S Cole | 4 | 2 | 6 | 3
(France) A Boetsch | 6 | 6 | 2 | 6
(New Zealand) B Steven | 6 | 6^{5} | 6 | 2 | 6
(Sweden) M Gustafsson | 3 | 7^{7} | 4 | 6 | 3
(Australia) W Masur | 6 | 6 | 7^{7}
(Spain) J Sánchez | 1 | 4 | 6^{4}
Q | (United States) D Randall | 6 | 6 | 6
(Russia) A Cherkasov | 3 | 4 | 4
(Austria) H Skoff | 3 | 1 | 3
(Denmark) K Carlsen | 6 | 6 | 6
(France) C Pioline | 6 | 7 | 3 | 7
(Czech Republic) M Damm | 4 | 5 | 6 | 5
Q | (Germany) P Moraing | 7^{10} | 3 | 4 | 6^{3}
10 | (Ukraine) A Medvedev | 6^{8} | 6 | 6 | 7^{7}

Second round
7 | (United States) I Lendl | 6 | 5 | 3 | 4
(France) A Boetsch | 4 | 7 | 6 | 6
(New Zealand) B Steven | 5 | 6^{6} | 6^{2}
(Australia) W Masur | 7 | 7^{8} | 7^{7}
Q | (United States) D Randall | 2 | 2 | 3
(Denmark) K Carlsen | 6 | 6 | 6
(France) C Pioline | 6^{7} | 7^{8} | 6 | 6
10 | (Ukraine) A Medvedev | 7^{9} | 6^{6} | 3 | 4

Third round
(France) A Boetsch | 3 | 4 | 7^{7} | 7^{7} | 4
(Australia) W Masur | 6 | 6 | 6^{5} | 6^{3} | 6
(Denmark) K Carlsen | 4 | 4 | 3
(France) C Pioline | 6 | 6 | 6

Fourth round
(Australia) W Masur | 3 | 2 | 6 | 7^{7} | 6
(France) C Pioline | 6 | 6 | 3 | 6^{4} | 8

==== Section 8 ====
First round
16 | (Austria) T Muster | 5 | 4 | 2
(France) O Delaître | 7 | 6 | 6
(United States) C Adams | 6^{4} | 3 | 6 | 6 | 7
(United States) R Matuszewski | 7^{7} | 6 | 4 | 4 | 9
WC | (Australia) J Fitzgerald | 6 | 6 | 6
(Belgium) B Wuyts | 0 | 3 | 3
(Argentina) J Frana | 6 | 7 | 7^{7}
(United Kingdom) J Bates | 4 | 5 | 6^{4}
(Argentina) D Orsanic | 3 | 0 | 2
WC | (United Kingdom) C Wilkinson | 6 | 6 | 6
(Sweden) J Svensson | 6 | 6 | 6^{4} | 6^{7} | 8
Q | (Canada) S Lareau | 2 | 4 | 7^{7} | 7^{9} | 10
(Israel) A Mansdorf | 6^{8} | 4 | 7^{7} | 6 | 6
Q | (United States) B Joelson | 7^{10} | 6 | 6^{5} | 3 | 3
Q | (Canada) G Rusedski | 6^{9} | 4 | 7^{9} | 6^{5}
2 | (Sweden) S Edberg | 7^{11} | 6 | 6^{7} | 7^{7}

Second round
(France) O Delaître | 0 | 3 | 6 | 3
(United States) R Matuszewski | 6 | 6 | 3 | 6
WC | (Australia) J Fitzgerald | 4 | 3 | 2
(Argentina) J Frana | 6 | 6 | 6
WC | (United Kingdom) C Wilkinson | 6 | 6 | 6
Q | (Canada) S Lareau | 3 | 4 | 4
(Israel) A Mansdorf | 3 | 4 | 4
2 | (Sweden) S Edberg | 6 | 6 | 6

Third round
(United States) R Matuszewski | 6 | 3 | 6 | 6
(Argentina) J Frana | 4 | 6 | 2 | 2
WC | (United Kingdom) C Wilkinson | 4 | 5 | 3
2 | (Sweden) S Edberg | 6 | 7 | 6

Fourth round
(United States) R Matuszewski | 6^{5} | 2 | 2
2 | (Sweden) S Edberg | 7^{7} | 6 | 6

| Preceded by 1993 French Open – Men's singles | Grand Slam men's singles | Succeeded by 1993 US Open – Men's singles |
