= 1993 French Open – Men's singles =

Men's singles
- 1993 French Open

Final
- Champion: (Spain) Sergi Bruguera
- Runner-up: (United States) Jim Courier
- Score: 6–4, 2–6, 6–2, 3–6, 6–3

Details
- Draw: 128
- Seeds: 16

Events
Singles	men	women		boys	girls
Doubles	men	women	mixed	boys	girls
WC Singles	men	women	quad
WC Doubles	men	women	quad
Legends	−45	45+	women
- French Open

Sergi Bruguera defeated two-time defending champion Jim Courier in the final, 6–4, 2–6, 6–2, 3–6, 6–3 to win the men's singles tennis title at the 1993 French Open. It was his first major singles title. Bruguera was the first Spaniard to win a major since Manuel Orantes in 1975.

As of 2025, Bruguera's 6–0, 6–0, 6–0 (triple bagel) defeat of Thierry Champion in the second round is the most recent instance in which this scoreline has occurred in a major match.

This tournament marked the first major main draw appearance of future world No. 1, French Open and Australian Open champion, and Olympic gold medalist Yevgeny Kafelnikov; he lost to Sláva Doseděl in the second round.

== Seeds ==
The seeded players are listed below. Sergi Bruguera is the champion; others show the round in which they were eliminated.

1. (United States) Pete Sampras (quarterfinals)
2. (United States) Jim Courier (finals)
3. (Sweden) Stefan Edberg (quarterfinals)
4. (Germany) Boris Becker (second round)
5. (Croatia) Goran Ivanišević (third round)
6. (Czech Republic) Petr Korda (second round)
7. (United States) Ivan Lendl (first round)
8. (United States) Michael Chang (second round)
9. (Germany) Michael Stich (fourth round)
10. (Spain) Sergi Bruguera (champion)
11. (Ukraine) Andrei Medvedev (semifinals)
12. (Netherlands) Richard Krajicek (semifinals)
13. (Czech Republic) Karel Nováček (quarterfinals)
14. (South Africa) Wayne Ferreira (second round)
15. (Austria) Thomas Muster (fourth round)
16. (United States) MaliVai Washington (fourth round)

== Draw ==
Key

- Q = Qualifier
- WC = Wild card
- LL = Lucky loser
- Alt = Alternate
- ITF = ITF entry
- PR = Protected ranking
- SR = Special ranking
- SE = Special exempt
- JE = Junior exempt
- JR = Junior Accelerator Programme entrant
- CO = College Accelerator Programme entrant
- NG = Next Gen Accelerator Program entrant
- w/o = Walkover
- r = Retired
- d = Defaulted

=== Finals ===
Quarterfinals
1	(United States) Pete Sampras	3	6	1	4
10	(Spain) Sergi Bruguera	6	4	6	6
3	(Sweden) Stefan Edberg	0	7^{7}	5	4
11	(Ukraine) Andrei Medvedev	6	6^{3}	7	6
12	(Netherlands) Richard Krajicek	3	6	3	6	6
13	(Czech Republic) Karel Nováček	6	3	6	3	4
(Croatia) Goran Prpić	1	6	0	5
2	(United States) Jim Courier	6	4	6	7

Semifinals
10	(Spain) Sergi Bruguera	6	6	6
11	(Ukraine) Andrei Medvedev	0	4	2
12	(Netherlands) Richard Krajicek	1	7^{7}	5	2
2	(United States) Jim Courier	6	6^{2}	7	6

Final
10	(Spain) Sergi Bruguera	6	2	6	3	6
2	(United States) Jim Courier	4	6	2	6	3

=== Top half ===
==== Section 1 ====
First round
1	(United States) P Sampras	6	6	3	6
(Russia) A Cherkasov	1	2	6	1
(Australia) J Morgan	5	2	1
(South Africa) M Ondruska	7	6	6
WC	(France) G Solvès	1	7^{9}	1	4
(Sweden) J Svensson	6	6^{7}	6	6
(Argentina) A Mancini	2	4	0
(Spain) J Sánchez	6	6	6
(Sweden) N Kulti	6	2	6^{8}	2
(United States) D Rostagno	1	6	7^{10}	6
(Switzerland) J Hlasek	6	7	6
Q	(Peru) A Aramburú	2	5	2
(Sweden) T Enqvist	3	4	6	7^{8}	0
Q	(Germany) C Arriens	6	6	2	6^{6}	6
(Sweden) A Järryd	3	6	4	4
16	(United States) M Washington	6	2	6	6

Second round
1	(United States) P Sampras	7	6	6
(South Africa) M Ondruska	5	0	3
(Sweden) J Svensson	6	6^{2}	5	6	6
(Spain) J Sánchez	3	7^{7}	7	3	4
(United States) D Rostagno	6	6	4	6
(Switzerland) J Hlasek	3	4	6	2
Q	(Germany) C Arriens	6^{6}	4	0
16	(United States) M Washington	7^{8}	6	6

Third round
1	(United States) P Sampras	6	6	6
(Sweden) J Svensson	4	4	2
(United States) D Rostagno	6^{5}	6	1	2
16	(United States) M Washington	7^{7}	3	6	6

Fourth round
1	(United States) P Sampras	6	7^{8}	6
16	(United States) M Washington	3	6^{6}	1

==== Section 2 ====
First round
10	(Spain) S Bruguera	7^{7}	6	6
(France) H Leconte	6^{3}	1	0
(Italy) O Camporese	2	7	4	3
WC	(France) T Champion	6	5	6	6
(Spain) À Corretja	6	3	6^{5}	6^{4}
(Sweden) M Larsson	2	6	7^{7}	7^{7}
(France) S Simian	4	6	1	4
(Brazil) J Oncins	6	4	6	6
WC	(France) F Fontang	3	2	0
Q	(United States) B Devening	6	6	6
WC	(France) J-P Fleurian	6	0	3	6	3
(Germany) P Kühnen	3	6	6	3	6
Q	(Brazil) F Meligeni	6	6	6
WC	(France) S Sansoni	3	3	4
Q	(France) S Huet	3	7	6	7^{7}
7	(United States) I Lendl	6	5	0	6^{2}

Second round
10	(Spain) S Bruguera	6	6	6
WC	(France) T Champion	0	0	0
(Sweden) M Larsson	3	7^{7}	6	6
(Brazil) J Oncins	6	6^{3}	4	4
Q	(United States) B Devening	5	4	1
(Germany) P Kühnen	7	6	6
Q	(Brazil) F Meligeni	7^{7}	7	6
Q	(France) S Huet	6^{4}	5	4

Third round
10	(Spain) S Bruguera	6	6	6
(Sweden) M Larsson	1	3	1
(Germany) P Kühnen	6	6	1	3	6
Q	(Brazil) F Meligeni	3	3	6	6	8

Fourth round
10	(Spain) S Bruguera	6	6	7
Q	(Brazil) F Meligeni	3	1	5

==== Section 3 ====
First round
3	(Sweden) S Edberg	6	6	4	6
(Uruguay) M Filippini	3	4	6	4
Q	(United States) R Weiss	4	4	6	3
(United States) A Krickstein	6	6	3	6
Q	(Argentina) H de la Peña	6	6	6
Q	(Germany) J Renzenbrink	3	3	2
(Czech Republic) M Damm	6^{1}	4	2
(United States) J Stark	7^{7}	6	6
(Mexico) L Herrera	6	3	4	6	3
Q	(Italy) M Visconti	1	6	6	1	6
(France) A Boetsch	4	4	6	2
(Germany) C-U Steeb	6	6	2	6
(Netherlands) P Haarhuis	6	6	5	6
(Russia) A Olhovskiy	3	1	7	3
(Netherlands) J Siemerink	3	6^{3}	4
14	(South Africa) W Ferreira	6	7^{7}	6

Second round
3	(Sweden) S Edberg	6	6	5	7
(United States) A Krickstein	3	1	7	5
Q	(Argentina) H de la Peña	6^{5}	6	5	6^{5}
(United States) J Stark	7^{7}	3	7	7^{7}
Q	(Italy) M Visconti	5	3	0
(Germany) C-U Steeb	7	6	6
(Netherlands) P Haarhuis	4	6	6	7^{7}
14	(South Africa) W Ferreira	6	3	0	6^{0}

Third round
3	(Sweden) S Edberg	6	6	7^{7}
(United States) J Stark	4	4	6^{4}
(Germany) C-U Steeb	6^{3}	3	1
(Netherlands) P Haarhuis	7^{7}	6	6

Fourth round
3	(Sweden) S Edberg	6	3	6	7^{7}
(Netherlands) P Haarhuis	4	6	3	6^{5}

==== Section 4 ====
First round
11	(Ukraine) A Medvedev	6^{2}	4	6	6	6
(Argentina) G Pérez Roldán	7^{7}	6	4	3	4
(Australia) W Masur	5	2	2
(Italy) R Furlan	7	6	6
(Belgium) B Wuyts	6	6	6
Q	(France) P Bouteyre	4	2	3
(Argentina) G Markus	4	6	6	6
(Sweden) M Gustafsson	6	3	2	2
(Australia) M Woodforde	6	6	6^{4}	6
(Uruguay) D Pérez	2	0	7^{7}	2
(France) G Raoux	4	6	6	3	2
(New Zealand) B Steven	6	3	2	6	6
(United States) D Wheaton	3	7^{7}	7^{7}	4	4
(Germany) M-K Goellner	6	6^{2}	6^{5}	6	6
(Sweden) L Jönsson	6^{2}	6	4	6^{4}
6	(Czech Republic) P Korda	7^{7}	4	6	7^{7}

Second round
11	(Ukraine) A Medvedev	6	6	6
(Italy) R Furlan	3	3	4
(Belgium) B Wuyts	1	6	2	4
(Argentina) G Markus	6	2	6	6
(Australia) M Woodforde	6	6^{6}	6	3	6
(Australia) B Steven	2	7^{8}	4	6	1
(Germany) M-K Goellner	6	7^{7}	7^{10}
6	(Czech Republic) P Korda	3	6^{4}	6^{8}

Third round
11	(Ukraine) A Medvedev	7^{7}	3	7	6
(Argentina) G Markus	6^{4}	6	5	4
(Australia) M Woodforde	6	6^{1}	3	7^{10}	5
(Germany) M-K Goellner	3	7^{7}	6	6^{8}	7

Fourth round
11	(Ukraine) A Medvedev	6	6	4	6
(Germany) M-K Goellner	4	4	6	3

=== Bottom half ===
==== Section 5 ====
First round
5	(Croatia) G Ivanišević	7	6	6
(Argentina) F Davín	5	3	4
(United States) R Reneberg	4	4	4
(Spain) A Berasategui	6	6	6
(Netherlands) J Eltingh	4	6^{6}	1
(Russia) A Chesnokov	6	7^{8}	6
Q	(Hungary) J Krocsko	0	3	1
(Spain) C Costa	6	6	6
(Australia) T Woodbridge	6	6	6
Q	(Netherlands) M Koevermans	4	4	2
(Spain) J Arrese	6	6	7^{7}
(Russia) A Volkov	2	4	6^{3}
(Switzerland) M Rosset	3	3	7	7	6
(United States) C Adams	6	6	5	5	4
(Sweden) C Bergström	5	3	5
12	(Netherlands) R Krajicek	7	6	7

Second round
5	(Croatia) G Ivanišević	6	6	6
(Spain) A Berasategui	3	3	2
(Russia) A Chesnokov	3	2	4
(Spain) C Costa	6	6	6
(Australia) T Woodbridge	6	4	6	5	0
(Spain) J Arrese	4	6	3	7	6
(Switzerland) M Rosset	2	3	1
12	(Netherlands) R Krajicek	6	6	6

Third round
5	(Croatia) G Ivanišević	6	2	5	3
(Spain) C Costa	2	6	7	6
(Spain) J Arrese	6	2	2	7^{8}	2
12	(Netherlands) R Krajicek	2	6	6	6^{6}	6

Fourth round
(Spain) C Costa	5	6	3	7	8
12	(Netherlands) R Krajicek	7	3	6	5	10

==== Section 6 ====
First round
13	(Czech Republic) K Nováček	7^{7}	6	7^{8}
(Haiti) R Agénor	6^{4}	2	6^{6}
(Spain) F Clavet	6	6	6
(Switzerland) C Mezzadri	4	2	4
Q	(Italy) S Pescosolido	4	6	6	6
(Czech Republic) D Vacek	6	3	4	2
(Denmark) K Carlsen	7^{7}	4	6	6
(Spain) E Sánchez	6^{4}	6	3	4
Q	(Slovakia) K Kučera	3	4	4
Q	(Russia) Y Kafelnikov	6	6	6
(United Kingdom) J Bates	3	2	1
(Czech Republic) S Doseděl	6	6	6
(France) R Gilbert	6	6	6
(United States) T Witsken	2	1	3
WC	(France) N Escudé	0	3	0
4	(Germany) B Becker	6	6	6

Second round
13	(Czech Republic) K Nováček	6	6	4	6
(Spain) F Clavet	4	2	6	0
Q	(Italy) S Pescosolido	6	1	6	6^{4}	6
(Denmark) K Carlsen	3	6	4	7^{7}	2
Q	(Russia) Y Kafelnikov	3	1	0
(Czech Republic) S Doseděl	6	6	6
(France) R Gilbert	7	6	7
4	(Germany) B Becker	5	3	5

Third round
13	(Czech Republic) K Nováček	6	6	3	5	8
Q	(Italy) S Pescosolido	3	1	6	7	6
(Czech Republic) S Doseděl	4	7	6	6
(France) R Gilbert	6	5	4	4

Fourth round
13	(Czech Republic) K Nováček	7	6	7
(Czech Republic) S Doseděl	5	4	5

==== Section 7 ====
First round
8	(United States) M Chang	6	6	6
Q	(France) F Vitoux	4	2	3
WC	(France) T Guardiola	6	3	4	7^{9}	3
(Germany) B Karbacher	4	6	6	6^{7}	6
(Japan) S Matsuoka	7	3	6	6
(France) F Santoro	6	6	3	3
(Croatia) G Prpić	3	7	6	6
WC	(France) L Roux	6	5	4	1
(Italy) G Pozzi	2	3	2
(United States) A O'Brien	6	6	6
(Brazil) L Mattar	6^{2}	2	5
(Australia) R Fromberg	7^{7}	6	7
(Spain) M A Górriz	1	4	4
(Sweden) H Holm	6	6	6
(Peru) J Yzaga	6^{5}	2	1
9	(Germany) M Stich	7^{7}	6	6

Second round
8	(United States) M Chang	6	3	4	2
(Germany) B Karbacher	1	6	6	6
(Japan) S Matsuoka	3	3	6	3
(Croatia) G Prpić	6	6	2	6
(United States) A O'Brien	2	1	2
(Australia) R Fromberg	6	6	6
(Sweden) H Holm	4	2	5
9	(Germany) M Stich	6	6	7

Third round
(Germany) B Karbacher	3	4	5
(Croatia) G Prpić	6	6	7
(Australia) R Fromberg	4	4	4
9	(Germany) M Stich	6	6	6

Fourth round
(Croatia) G Prpić	6	6	1	6
9	(Germany) M Stich	3	2	6	2

==== Section 8 ====
First round
15	(Austria) T Muster	0	6	6	6
(Austria) H Skoff	6	3	4	2
(Australia) S Stolle	6	6	3	0	2
(France) C Pioline	3	4	6	6	6
(United States) B Gilbert	5	4	6	6	10
(United States) B Shelton	7	6	2	1	8
(United States) T Martin	6^{4}	3	6^{0}
(Germany) D Prinosil	7^{7}	6	7^{7}
(Germany) M Naewie	6	6	2	1	4
(United States) J Tarango	0	2	6	6	6
(Austria) G Schaller	2	4	6	3
(France) O Delaître	6	6	4	6
(Spain) T Carbonell	7^{7}	6	6
(Argentina) J Frana	6^{1}	4	2
(Argentina) R Azar	3	3	3
2	(United States) J Courier	6	6	6

Second round
15	(Austria) T Muster	7	2	6	6
(France) C Pioline	6	6	4	2
(United States) B Gilbert	6	5	6	6
(Germany) D Prinosil	1	7	2	2
(United States) J Tarango	6	6	6
(France) O Delaître	4	2	4
(Spain) T Carbonell	4	1	0
2	(United States) J Courier	6	6	6

Third round
15	(Austria) T Muster	7	6	6
(United States) B Gilbert	6	2	4
(United States) J Tarango	1	7^{7}	3	5
2	(United States) J Courier	6	6^{2}	6	7

Fourth round
15	(Austria) T Muster	3	6	4	2
2	(United States) J Courier	6	2	6	6

Preceded by 1993 Australian Open – Men's singles	Grand Slam men's singles	Succeeded by 1993 Wimbledon Championships – Men's singles
