= Jörn Renzenbrink =

German tennis player

- ITF name: Joern Renzenbrink
- Country (sports): Germany
- Born: 17 July 1972 (age 54) Hamburg, West Germany
- Height: 1.96 m (6 ft 5 in)
- Turned pro: 1991
- Retired: 2003
- Plays: Right-handed (one-handed backhand)
- Prize money: $504,929

Singles
- Career record: 34–54
- Career titles: 0; 2 Challenger, 0 Futures
- Highest ranking: No. 70 (12 September 1994)

Grand Slam singles results
- Australian Open: 3R (1994)
- French Open: 1R (1993, 1994, 1995)
- Wimbledon: 2R (1994)
- US Open: 4R (1994)

Doubles
- Career record: 7–18
- Career titles: 1; 0 Challenger, 0 Futures
- Highest ranking: No. 153 (17 July 1995)
- Last updated on: 11 March 2023.

Jörn Renzenbrink (born 17 July 1972) is a retired professional tennis player from Germany.

== Career ==
A right hander, Renzenbrink had his best Grand Slam performance in the 1994 US Open, when he made it into the fourth round. He started his campaign with a straight sets victory over South African Grant Stafford, followed by a four-sets defeat of Morocco's Karim Alami and then a win over Italian Andrea Gaudenzi. In the fourth round he met Jonas Björkman and took him to five sets, but lost.

Renzenbrink never won a singles tournament on the ATP Tour but was runner-up on one occasion, at the 1994 KAL Cup Korea Open. He did however win a doubles title, with fellow German Markus Zoecke, as qualifiers, at the 1995 Hall of Fame Tennis Championships in Newport, Rhode Island.

He won two ATP Challenger Series tournaments during his career, the first in Andorra in 1993 and the other at Aachen in his home country.

== ATP Career Finals ==
=== Singles: 1 (1 runner-up) ===
Legend Grand Slam Tournaments (0–0) ATP World Tour Finals (0–0) ATP Masters Series (0–0) ATP Championship Series (0–0) ATP World Series (0–1)	Finals by surface Hard (0–1) Clay (0–0) Grass (0–0) Carpet (0–0)	Finals by setting Outdoors (0–1) Indoors (0–0)

Result	W–L	Date	Tournament	Tier	Surface	Opponent	Score
Loss	0–1	Apr 1994	Seoul, South Korea	World Series	Hard	(United Kingdom) Jeremy Bates	4–6, 7–6^{(7–5)}, 3–6

=== Doubles: 1 (1 title) ===
Legend Grand Slam Tournaments (0–0) ATP World Tour Finals (0–0) ATP Masters Series (0–0) ATP Championship Series (0–0) ATP World Series (1–0)	Finals by surface Hard (0–0) Clay (0–0) Grass (1–0) Carpet (0–0)	Finals by setting Outdoors (1–0) Indoors (0–0)

Result	W–L	Date	Tournament	Tier	Surface	Partner	Opponents	Score
Win	1–0	Jul 1995	Newport, United States	World Series	Grass	(Germany) Markus Zoecke	(Australia) Paul Kilderry (Portugal) Nuno Marques	6–1, 6–2

== ATP Challenger and ITF Futures finals ==
=== Singles: 4 (2–2) ===
Legend ATP Challenger (2–2) ITF Futures (0–0)	Finals by surface Hard (1–2) Clay (0–0) Grass (0–0) Carpet (1–0)

Result	W–L	Date	Tournament	Tier	Surface	Opponent	Score
Loss	0–1	Aug 1992	Segovia, Spain	Challenger	Hard	(France) Guillaume Raoux	6–7, 6–7
Win	1–1	Dec 1993	Andorra la Vella, Andorra	Challenger	Hard	(Haiti) Ronald Agenor	6–4, 5–7, 6–3
Loss	1–2	Dec 1994	Cologne, Germany	Challenger	Hard	(Germany) Karsten Braasch	4–6, 4–6
Win	2–2	Nov 1995	Aachen, Germany	Challenger	Carpet	(Czech Republic) Martin Damm	5–7, 6–3, 6–4

=== Doubles: 2 (0–2) ===
Legend ATP Challenger (0–2) ITF Futures (0–0)	Finals by surface Hard (0–1) Clay (0–0) Grass (0–1) Carpet (0–0)

Result	W–L	Date	Tournament	Tier	Surface	Partner	Opponents	Score
Loss	0–1	Dec 1994	Cologne, Germany	Challenger	Hard	(Australia) Pat Cash	(Germany) Alexander Mronz (Germany) Udo Riglewski	4–6, 2–6
Loss	0–2	Jun 1995	Annenheim, Austria	Challenger	Grass	(Germany) Karsten Braasch	(Italy) Diego Nargiso (Venezuela) Nicolas Pereira	7–6, 4–6, 6–7

== Performance timeline ==
Key
W	F	SF	QF	#R	RR	Q#	DNQ	A	NH

(W) winner; (F) finalist; (SF) semifinalist; (QF) quarterfinalist; (#R) rounds 4, 3, 2, 1; (RR) round-robin stage; (Q#) qualification round; (DNQ) did not qualify; (A) absent; (NH) not held; (SR) strike rate (events won / competed); (W–L) win–loss record.

=== Singles ===
Tournament	1992	1993	1994	1995	1996	SR	W–L	Win %
Grand Slam tournaments
Australian Open	A	1R	3R	1R	Q1	0 / 3	2–3	40%
French Open	A	1R	1R	1R	Q1	0 / 3	0–3	0%
Wimbledon	A	Q1	2R	1R	1R	0 / 3	1–3	25%
US Open	Q2	A	4R	A	Q1	0 / 1	3–1	75%
Win–loss	0–0	0–2	6–4	0–3	0–1	0 / 10	6–10	38%
ATP Masters Series
Hamburg	A	2R	2R	2R	1R	0 / 4	3–4	43%
Rome	A	A	A	Q1	A	0 / 0	0–0	–
Canada	A	A	A	A	1R	0 / 1	0–1	0%
Paris	A	A	Q2	A	A	0 / 0	0–0	–
Win–loss	0–0	1–1	1–1	1–1	0–2	0 / 5	3–5	38%
