= Bertrand Lemercier =

French tennis player

- Country (sports): France
- Born: 1 March 1968 (age 57); Paris, France
- Plays: Right-handed
- Prize money: $24,951

Singles
- Career record: 0–0
- Career titles: 0
- Highest ranking: No. 486 (2 May 1994)

Doubles
- Career record: 0–2
- Career titles: 1 Challenger
- Highest ranking: No. 180 (26 July 1993)
- Last updated on: 26 August 2019.

Bertrand Lemercier (born 1 March 1968) is a retired French tennis player.

Lemercier has a career high ATP singles ranking of 486 achieved on 2 May 1994. He also has a career high doubles ranking of 180 achieved on 26 July 1993.

Lemercier has won 1 ATP Challenger doubles title at the 1992 Istanbul Challenger.

== Tour titles ==
Legend
Grand Slam (0)
ATP Masters Series (0)
ATP Tour (0)
Challengers (1)

=== Doubles ===
Result	Date	Category	Tournament	Surface	Partner	Opponents	Score
Winner	August 1992	Challenger	Istanbul, Turkey	Hard	(France) Stéphane Simian	(The Bahamas) Roger Smith (Argentina) Roberto Saad	7–6, 7–6
