= Brian Devening =

American tennis player

- Country (sports): United States
- Residence: Dallas, Texas
- Born: July 16, 1967 (age 57); Milwaukee, Wisconsin, United States
- Height: 6 ft 1 in (1.85 m)
- Turned pro: 1990
- Plays: Right-handed
- Prize money: $177,318

Singles
- Career record: 2–9
- Career titles: 0
- Highest ranking: No. 277 (November 19, 1990)

Grand Slam singles results
- French Open: 2R (1993)
- Wimbledon: 1R (1993)

Doubles
- Career record: 34–48
- Career titles: 0
- Highest ranking: No. 77 (April 4, 1994)

Grand Slam doubles results
- Australian Open: 1R (1993, 1994)
- French Open: 1R (1994)
- Wimbledon: 2R (1994)
- US Open: 1R (1993, 1994)

Brian Devening (born July 16, 1967) is a former professional tennis player from the United States.

== Career ==
Devening was the American Hardcourt Championship winner in 1983 and was ranked amongst the top 25 juniors for six years.

Before turning professional, Devening played tennis for Southern Methodist University, from where he would graduate with a business degree. On the ATP Tour he made his appearances mostly in the doubles circuit.

He made the second round of a Grand Slam doubles tournament just once, at the 1994 Wimbledon Championships with countryman Greg Van Emburgh. The pair defeated the Australian pairing of Darren Cahill and John Fitzgerald. As a singles player he reached the second round of the French Open in 1993, beating Frédéric Fontang. His only other singles appearance was in Wimbledon that year, where he lost to seventh seed Ivan Lendl in four sets.

The American reached two ATP finals during his career, both in 1993, at Båstad and Santiago. He also exited in the semi-final stage of four tournaments, Prague and Tel Aviv in 1992, then Mexico City and Rosmalen in 1994.

== ATP career finals ==
=== Doubles: 2 (0–2) ===
Result	W/L	Year	Tournament	Surface	Partner	Opponents	Score
Loss	0–1	1993	Båstad, Sweden	Clay	(Sweden) Tomas Nydahl	(Sweden) Henrik Holm (Sweden) Anders Järryd	1–6, 6–3, 3–6
Loss	0–2	1993	Santiago, Chile	Clay	(Sweden) Christer Allgårdh	(United States) Mike Bauer (Czech Republic) David Rikl	6–7, 4–6

== Challenger titles ==
=== Doubles: (1) ===
No.	Year	Tournament	Surface	Partner	Opponents	Score
1.	1994	Singapore	Hard	(Netherlands) Sander Groen	(Mexico) Leonardo Lavalle (Brazil) Danilo Marcelino	6–2, 7–6
