= Jeremy Bates (tennis) =

British tennis player (born 1962)

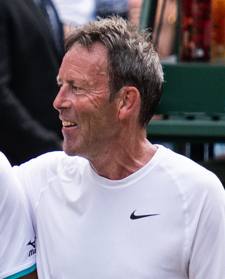
- Bates in 2019
- Full name: Michael Jeremy Bates
- Country (sports): United Kingdom
- Residence: London, England, United Kingdom
- Born: 19 June 1962 (age 64) Solihull, England, United Kingdom
- Height: 1.80 m (5 ft 11 in)
- Turned pro: 1982
- Retired: 1996
- Plays: Right-handed (one-handed backhand)
- Prize money: $1,338,555

Singles
- Career record: 132–193
- Career titles: 1
- Highest ranking: No. 54 (17 April 1995)

Grand Slam singles results
- Australian Open: 3R (1989)
- French Open: 3R (1988, 1989)
- Wimbledon: 4R (1992, 1994)
- US Open: 2R (1986)

Other tournaments
- Olympic Games: 2R (1988)

Doubles
- Career record: 163–170
- Career titles: 3
- Highest ranking: No. 25 (4 March 1991)

Grand Slam doubles results
- Australian Open: F (1988)
- French Open: 3R (1987)
- Wimbledon: QF (1990, 1993)
- US Open: 2R (1986, 1990)

Other doubles tournaments
- Olympic Games: 1R (1988)

Grand Slam mixed doubles results
- Australian Open: W (1991)
- Wimbledon: W (1987)
- Last updated on: 10 March 2023.

Michael Jeremy Bates (born 19 June 1962) is a British former professional tennis player. He was ranked UK number 1 in 1987 and from 1989 to 1994. He reached a career-high ATP world ranking of 54 from 17 April 1995 to 23 April 1995.

During his career Bates won two Grand Slam mixed doubles titles, at Wimbledon in 1987 and the Australian Open in 1991, partnering his fellow British player Jo Durie. He also won one top-level singles title and three men's doubles titles on the professional circuit. After retiring as a player, Bates served as the captain of Britain's Davis Cup team from 2004 to 2006.

== Career ==
Bates turned professional in 1982. Partnering his fellow British player Jo Durie, he won the mixed doubles titles at Wimbledon in 1987, the first British doubles team to win the title for 51 years and the Australian Open in 1991, the first time a British doubles team has ever won the title. He was also a Men's Doubles runner-up at the Australian Open in 1988 (partnering Sweden's Peter Lundgren).

As a singles player, Bates reached the fourth round at Wimbledon twice – in 1992 and 1994 – losing on both occasions to France's Guy Forget. In the 1992 encounter, Bates held a match point against Forget in the fourth set, but failed to convert it and ended up losing in five sets 7–6, 4–6, 6–3, 6–7, 3–6, narrowly missing out on a place in the quarter-finals against John McEnroe. Bates was also the first ever opponent of Andre Agassi in the main draw of a Grand Slam tournament, in the first round of the 1986 US Open, with Bates winning in four sets against the 16-year-old wildcard Agassi.

Bates won one top-level singles title during his career – at Seoul in 1994 when he was aged 31, becoming the first British male to win an ATP tour title since Mark Cox in 1977 (he was the oldest champion on the tour that season). He also won three men's doubles titles at Tel Aviv (1989), Queen's Club (1990), and Rotterdam (1994). He was the British national champion six times, and played in 20 Davis Cup ties for Britain, scoring 27 wins and 24 losses. His career-high rankings were World No. 54 in singles (in 1995) and World No. 25 in doubles (in 1991).

== Grand Slam finals ==
=== Doubles: 1 (1 loss) ===
Result	Year	Championship	Surface	Partner	Opponents	Score
Loss	1988	Australian Open	Hard	(Sweden) Peter Lundgren	(United States) Rick Leach (United States) Jim Pugh	3–6, 2–6, 3–6

=== Mixed doubles: 2 (2 wins) ===
Result	Year	Championship	Surface	Partner	Opponents	Score
Win	1987	Wimbledon	Grass	(United Kingdom) Jo Durie	(Australia) Nicole Bradtke (Australia) Darren Cahill	7–6^{(12–10)}, 6–3
Win	1991	Australian Open	Hard	(United Kingdom) Jo Durie	(United States) Robin White (United States) Scott Davis	2–6, 6–4, 6–4

== ATP Career Finals ==
=== Singles: 1 (1 title) ===
Legend Grand Slam Tournaments (0–0) ATP World Tour Finals (0–0) ATP Masters Series (0–0) ATP Championship Series (0–0) ATP World Series (1–0)	Finals by surface Hard (1–0) Clay (0–0) Grass (0–0) Carpet (0–0)	Finals by setting Outdoors (1–0) Indoors (0–0)

Result	W–L	Date	Tournament	Tier	Surface	Opponent	Score
Win	1–0	Apr 1994	Seoul, South Korea	World Series	Hard	(Germany) Jörn Renzenbrink	6–4, 6–7^{(5–7)}, 6–3

=== Doubles: 11 (3 titles, 8 runner-ups) ===
Legend Grand Slam Tournaments (0–1) ATP World Tour Finals (0–0) ATP Masters Series (0–0) ATP Championship Series (0–1) ATP World Series (3–6)	Finals by surface Hard (1–3) Clay (0–0) Grass (1–1) Carpet (1–4)	Finals by setting Outdoors (2–3) Indoors (1–5)

Result	W–L	Date	Tournament	Tier	Surface	Partner	Opponents	Score
Loss	0–1	Jan 1988	Melbourne, Australia	Grand Slam	Hard	(Sweden) Peter Lundgren	(United States) Rick Leach (United States) Jim Pugh	3–6, 2–6, 3–6
Loss	0–2	Aug 1988	Rye Brook, United States	Grand Prix	Hard	(Denmark) Michael Mortensen	(United Kingdom) Andrew Castle (United States) Tim Wilkison	6–4, 5–7, 6–7
Loss	0–3	Oct 1988	Basel, Switzerland	Grand Prix	Hard	(Sweden) Peter Lundgren	(Switzerland) Jakob Hlasek (United States) Tomáš Šmíd	3–6, 1–6
Loss	0–4	Oct 1988	Frankfurt, West Germany	Grand Prix	Carpet	(Netherlands) Tom Nijssen	(Germany) Rudiger Haas (Croatia) Goran Ivanisevic	6–1, 5–7, 3–6
Win	1–4	Oct 1989	Tel-Aviv, Israel	Grand Prix	Hard	(West Germany) Patrick Baur	(Sweden) Rikard Bergh (Sweden) Per Henricsson	6–1, 4–6, 6–1
Loss	1–5	Nov 1989	Wembley, United Kingdom	Grand Prix	Carpet	(United States) Kevin Curren	(Switzerland) Jakob Hlasek (United States) John McEnroe	1–6, 6–7
Win	2–5	Jun 1990	Queen's, United Kingdom	World Series	Grass	(United States) Kevin Curren	(France) Henri Leconte (Czechoslovakia) Ivan Lendl	6–2, 7–6
Loss	2–6	Feb 1991	Stuttgard, Germany	Championship Series	Carpet	(United Kingdom) Nick Brown	(Spain) Sergio Casal (Spain) Emilio Sánchez	3–6, 5–7
Loss	2–7	Oct 1991	Toulouse, France	World Series	Carpet	(United States) Kevin Curren	(Netherlands) Tom Nijssen (Czech Republic) Cyril Suk	6–3, 3–6, 6–7
Loss	2–8	Jun 1992	Manchester, United Kingdom	World Series	Grass	(Australia) Laurie Warder	(United States) Patrick Galbraith (Australia) David Macpherson	6–4, 3–6, 2–6
Win	3–8	Feb 1994	Rotterdam, Netherlands	World Series	Carpet	(Sweden) Jonas Björkman	(Netherlands) Jacco Eltingh (Netherlands) Paul Haarhuis	6–4, 6–1

== ATP Challenger and ITF Futures finals ==
=== Singles: 10 (5–5) ===
Legend ATP Challenger (5–5) ITF Futures (0–0)	Finals by surface Hard (4–3) Clay (0–0) Grass (1–0) Carpet (0–2)

Result	W–L	Date	Tournament	Tier	Surface	Opponent	Score
Loss	0–1	Mar 1989	Madeira, Portugal	Challenger	Hard	(Portugal) Nuno Marques	3–6, 3–6
Loss	0–2	Apr 1990	Cape Town, South Africa	Challenger	Carpet	(South Africa) Gary Muller	7–5, 2–6, 3–6
Win	1–2	Apr 1990	Durban, South Africa	Challenger	Hard	(South Africa) Grant Stafford	6–4, 6–1
Win	2–2	Oct 1991	Cherbourg, France	Challenger	Hard	(Zimbabwe) Byron Black	7–5, 1–6, 7–6
Loss	2–3	May 1992	Taipei, Taiwan	Challenger	Hard	(Australia) Sandon Stolle	3–6, 7–5, 5–7
Loss	2–4	May 1992	Kuala Lumpur, Malaysia	Challenger	Hard	(Australia) Sandon Stolle	6–7, 4–6
Loss	2–5	Oct 1993	Dublin, Ireland	Challenger	Carpet	(Italy) Paolo Cane	3–6, 5–7
Win	3–5	Oct 1993	Gothenburg, Sweden	Challenger	Hard	(Germany) Alex Radulescu	6–2, 6–3
Win	4–5	Oct 1994	Brest, France	Challenger	Hard	(France) Lionel Barthez	6–3, 6–1
Win	5–5	Jul 1995	Bristol, United Kingdom	Challenger	Grass	(United Kingdom) Andrew Foster	6–7, 6–4, 6–3

=== Doubles: 7 (5–2) ===
Legend ATP Challenger (5–2) ITF Futures (0–0)	Finals by surface Hard (3–2) Clay (0–0) Grass (0–0) Carpet (2–0)

Result	W–L	Date	Tournament	Tier	Surface	Partner	Opponents	Score
Loss	0–1	Feb 1987	Enugu, Nigeria	Challenger	Hard	(Czech Republic) Stanislav Birner	(Mexico) Jorge Lozano (United States) Tim Pawsat	1–6, 6–1, 2–6
Win	1–1	Feb 1989	Telford, United Kingdom	Challenger	Carpet	(United Kingdom) Nick Brown	(Sweden) Ronnie Baathman (Sweden) Rikard Bergh	6–4, 7–6
Win	2–1	Apr 1990	Cape Town, South Africa	Challenger	Carpet	(South Africa) Marius Barnard	(South Africa) Wayne Ferreira (South Africa) Pieter Norval	6–3, 6–1
Win	3–1	Apr 1992	Nagoya, Japan	Challenger	Hard	(United Kingdom) Mark Petchey	(Haiti) Bertrand Madsen (India) Leander Paes	7–5, 3–6, 7–6
Loss	3–2	Aug 1992	New Haven, United States	Challenger	Hard	(Zimbabwe) Byron Black	(United States) Todd Nelson (India) Leander Paes	5–7, 6–2, 6–7
Abandoned	3–2	Jul 1993	Bristol, United Kingdom	Challenger	Grass	(United Kingdom) Mark Petchey	(United Kingdom) Paul Hand (United Kingdom) Chris Wilkinson	7–6, 4–6
Win	4–2	Sep 1993	Singapore, Singapore	Challenger	Hard	(South Africa) Christo Van Rensburg	(Netherlands) Sander Groen (South Africa) Grant Stafford	6–3, 6–4
Win	5–2	Oct 1993	Gothenburg, Sweden	Challenger	Hard	(United Kingdom) Chris Wilkinson	(United Kingdom) Andrew Foster (United Kingdom) Ross Matheson	7–6, 6–3

== Performance timelines ==
Key
W	F	SF	QF	#R	RR	Q#	DNQ	A	NH

(W) winner; (F) finalist; (SF) semifinalist; (QF) quarterfinalist; (#R) rounds 4, 3, 2, 1; (RR) round-robin stage; (Q#) qualification round; (DNQ) did not qualify; (A) absent; (NH) not held; (SR) strike rate (events won / competed); (W–L) win–loss record.

=== Singles ===
Tournament	1981	1982	1983	1984	1985	1986	1987	1988	1989	1990	1991	1992	1993	1994	1995	1996	SR	W–L	Win %
Grand Slam tournaments
Australian Open	A	Q2	Q2	Q1	1R	A	2R	2R	3R	1R	1R	1R	1R	A	2R	A	0 / 9	4–9	31%
French Open	A	A	A	A	A	1R	A	3R	3R	1R	A	A	1R	Q2	1R	A	0 / 6	4–6	40%
Wimbledon	Q2	1R	1R	1R	1R	1R	3R	2R	2R	2R	2R	4R	1R	4R	1R	1R	0 / 15	12–15	44%
US Open	A	A	A	A	1R	2R	A	1R	A	1R	A	A	Q2	1R	1R	A	0 / 6	1–6	14%
Win–loss	0–0	0–1	0–1	0–1	0–3	1–3	2–2	4–4	5–3	1–4	1–2	3–2	0–3	3–2	1–4	0–1	0 / 36	21–36	37%
National Representation
Summer Olympics	Not Held			A	Not Held			2R	Not Held			A	Not Held			A	0 / 1	1–1	50%
ATP Masters Series
Miami	A	A	A	A	A	1R	A	1R	A	1R	A	A	A	A	A	A	0 / 3	0–3	0%
Rome	A	A	A	A	A	A	A	1R	A	A	A	A	A	A	A	A	0 / 1	0–1	0%
Canada	A	A	A	A	A	A	A	A	1R	A	A	1R	2R	2R	1R	A	0 / 5	2–5	29%
Cincinnati	A	A	A	A	A	A	A	A	A	1R	A	A	Q1	A	A	A	0 / 1	0–1	0%
Win–loss	0–0	0–0	0–0	0–0	0–0	0–1	0–0	0–2	0–1	0–2	0–0	0–1	1–1	1–1	0–1	0–0	0 / 10	2–10	17%

=== Doubles ===
Tournament	1981	1982	1983	1984	1985	1986	1987	1988	1989	1990	1991	1992	1993	1994	1995	1996	SR	W–L	Win %
Grand Slam tournaments
Australian Open	A	A	2R	A	3R	A	2R	F	2R	1R	SF	1R	2R	A	A	A	0 / 9	15–9	63%
French Open	A	A	A	A	A	1R	3R	1R	1R	1R	2R	2R	1R	A	A	A	0 / 8	4–8	33%
Wimbledon	Q1	1R	2R	1R	2R	1R	2R	2R	1R	QF	1R	2R	QF	2R	1R	2R	0 / 15	13–15	46%
US Open	A	A	A	A	A	2R	A	1R	1R	2R	1R	A	A	A	A	A	0 / 5	2–5	29%
Win–loss	0–0	0–1	2–2	0–1	3–2	1–3	4–3	6–4	1–4	4–4	5–4	2–3	4–3	1–1	0–1	1–1	0 / 37	34–37	48%
National Representation
Summer Olympics	Not Held			A	Not Held			1R	Not Held			A	Not Held			A	0 / 1	0–1	0%
ATP Masters Series
Miami	A	A	A	A	A	2R	1R	3R	A	A	A	1R	A	A	A	A	0 / 4	3–4	43%
Monte Carlo	A	A	A	A	A	2R	A	A	A	A	QF	A	A	A	A	A	0 / 2	3–2	60%
Rome	A	A	A	A	A	A	A	2R	A	A	1R	A	A	A	A	A	0 / 2	1–2	33%
Canada	A	A	A	A	A	A	A	A	SF	A	A	1R	2R	A	A	A	0 / 3	3–3	50%
Cincinnati	A	A	A	A	A	QF	A	1R	A	1R	A	A	Q1	A	A	A	0 / 3	2–3	40%
Win–loss	0–0	0–0	0–0	0–0	0–0	4–3	0–1	3–3	2–1	0–1	2–2	0–2	1–1	0–0	0–0	0–0	0 / 14	12–14	46%

=== Mixed Doubles ===
Tournament	1981	1982	1983	1984	1985	1986	1987	1988	1989	1990	1991	1992	1993	1994	1995	1996	SR	W–L	Win %
Grand Slam tournaments
Australian Open	A	A	A	A	A	A	A	A	A	QF	W	QF	A	A	A	A	1 / 3	9–2	82%
French Open	A	A	A	A	A	A	A	A	A	A	A	A	A	A	A	A	0 / 0	0–0	–
Wimbledon	3R	2R	A	A	1R	QF	W	2R	A	QF	3R	3R	QF	2R	2R	3R	1 / 13	24–12	67%
US Open	A	A	A	A	A	A	A	A	A	A	A	A	A	A	A	A	0 / 0	0–0	–
Win–loss	2–1	0–1	0–0	0–0	0–1	3–1	6–0	1–1	0–0	5–2	7–1	4–2	3–1	1–1	1–1	2–1	2 / 16	35–14	71%

== Post-retirement activity ==
Bates retired from the professional tour in 1996. Since leaving the tour, he has served as captain of Britain's Davis Cup team as well as playing in seniors' events. He quit as Head of Performance for the Lawn Tennis Association in January 2007. In September 2007, Bates was appointed Director of Tennis at the Sutton Tennis Academy (London, UK). He quit Sutton Tennis Academy in May 2010, and worked as a broadcaster and commentator for the BBC, Eurosport and Sky. He became the individual coach of former British Number 1 Anne Keothavong and continues to coach, including British player, Katie Boulter.
