= Chuck Adams =

American tennis player (born 1971)

- Country (sports): United States
- Residence: Pacific Palisades, California, United States
- Born: April 23, 1971 (age 55) Pacific Palisades, California, United States
- Height: 6 ft 1 in (1.85 m)
- Turned pro: 1990
- Retired: 1997
- Plays: Right-handed (two-handed backhand)
- Prize money: $818,519

Singles
- Career record: 83–93
- Career titles: 1; 4 Challenger, 0 Futures
- Highest ranking: No. 34 (6 February 1995)

Grand Slam singles results
- Australian Open: 2R (1996)
- French Open: 1R (1993, 1994)
- Wimbledon: 3R (1994)
- US Open: 4R (1993)

Doubles
- Career record: 2–4
- Career titles: 0; 0 Challenger, 0 Futures
- Highest ranking: No. 313 (15 June 1991)

Grand Slam doubles results
- Wimbledon: Q1 (1991, 1992)
- Last updated on: 9 October 2021.

Chuck Adams (born April 23, 1971) is an American former professional tennis player. He won one ATP singles title and achieved a career-high singles ranking of World No. 34 in 1995. He defeated Jonathan Stark to win the 1989 Boys' Junior National Tennis Championship Boys' 18 singles title.

== ATP career finals ==
=== Singles: 4 (1 title, 3 runners-up) ===
Legend Grand Slam tournaments (0–0) ATP World Tour Finals (0–0) ATP World Tour Masters Series (0–0) ATP World Tour Championship Series (0–0) ATP World Tour World Series (1–3)	Titles by surface Hard (1–2) Clay (0–0) Grass (0–0) Carpet (0–1)	Titles by setting Outdoor (1–2) Indoor (0–1)

Result	W–L	Date	Tournament	Tier	Surface	Opponent	Score
Win	1–0	Apr 1993	Seoul, South Korea	World Series	Hard	(Australia) Todd Woodbridge	6–4, 6–4
Loss	1–1	Aug 1994	Schenectady, United States	World Series	Hard	(Netherlands) Jacco Eltingh	3–6, 4–6
Loss	1–2	Nov 1994	Moscow, Russia	World Series	Carpet	(Russia) Alexander Volkov	2–6, 4–6
Loss	1–3	Jan 1995	Auckland, New Zealand	World Series	Hard	(Sweden) Thomas Enqvist	2–6, 1–6

== ATP Challenger and ITF Futures finals ==
=== Singles: 6 (4–2) ===
Legend ATP Challenger (4–2) ITF Futures (0–0)	Finals by surface Hard (3–2) Clay (1–0) Grass (0–0) Carpet (0–0)

Result	W–L	Date	Tournament	Tier	Surface	Opponent	Score
Loss	0–1	Sep 1990	Whistler, Canada	Challenger	Hard	(United States) Steve Devries	6–3, 5–7, 5–7
Loss	0–2	Dec 1990	Guam, Guam	Challenger	Hard	(Australia) Jamie Morgan	2–6, 6–7
Win	1–2	Jul 1991	Aptos, United States	Challenger	Hard	(United States) Bryan Shelton	6–3, 6–4
Win	2–2	Apr 1992	Nagoya, Japan	Challenger	Hard	(Canada) Daniel Nestor	7–6, 6–3
Win	3–2	Aug 1992	Winnetka, United States	Challenger	Hard	(United States) Steve Bryan	6–4, 6–4
Win	4–2	Jun 1994	Tashkent, Uzbekistan	Challenger	Clay	(Belgium) Filip Dewulf	6–4, 4–6, 7–6

== Performance timelines ==
Key
W	F	SF	QF	#R	RR	Q#	DNQ	A	NH

(W) winner; (F) finalist; (SF) semifinalist; (QF) quarterfinalist; (#R) rounds 4, 3, 2, 1; (RR) round-robin stage; (Q#) qualification round; (DNQ) did not qualify; (A) absent; (NH) not held; (SR) strike rate (events won / competed); (W–L) win–loss record.

=== Singles ===
Tournament	1990	1991	1992	1993	1994	1995	1996	SR	W–L	Win %
Grand Slam tournaments
Australian Open	A	A	1R	1R	A	1R	2R	0 / 4	1–4	20%
French Open	A	A	A	1R	1R	A	A	0 / 2	0–2	0%
Wimbledon	A	Q2	Q2	1R	3R	A	A	0 / 2	2–2	50%
US Open	1R	1R	3R	4R	1R	A	1R	0 / 6	5–6	45%
Win–loss	0–1	0–1	2–2	3–4	2–3	0–1	1–2	0 / 14	8–14	36%
ATP Tour Masters 1000
Indian Wells Masters	A	A	1R	Q1	A	2R	A	0 / 2	1–2	33%
Miami Open	A	A	2R	2R	1R	A	A	0 / 3	2–3	40%
Canada Masters	A	A	2R	1R	3R	A	A	0 / 3	3–3	50%
Cincinnati Masters	A	A	A	1R	A	A	Q2	0 / 1	0–1	0%
Paris Masters	A	A	A	A	1R	A	A	0 / 1	0–1	0%
Win–loss	0–0	0–0	2–3	1–3	2–3	1–1	0–0	0 / 10	6–10	38%
