= Jamie Morgan (tennis) =

Australian tennis player

- Country (sports): Australia
- Born: 8 June 1971 (age 55) Sydney, Australia
- Height: 185 cm (6 ft 1 in)
- Turned pro: 1990
- Plays: Right-handed (one-handed backhand)
- Prize money: $640,354

Singles
- Career record: 61–81
- Career titles: 0; 1 Challenger, 0 Futures
- Highest ranking: No. 52 (25 August 1993)

Grand Slam singles results
- Australian Open: 3R (1993)
- French Open: 1R (1993, 1994, 1995)
- Wimbledon: 2R (1993)
- US Open: 4R (1993)

Doubles
- Career record: 18–38
- Career titles: 0; 2 Challenger, 0 Futures
- Highest ranking: No. 122 (21 August 1995)

Team competitions
- Davis Cup: 1R (1994)
- Last updated on: 26 February 2024.

Jamie Morgan (born 8 June 1971) is a former professional tennis player from Australia. Morgan never won an ATP level singles title, but finished runner-up three times. He reached the fourth round of the 1993 U.S. Open, his best performance at a Grand Slam event. He achieved a career-high singles ranking of world No. 52 in 1993.

He played two singles matches for the Australian Davis Cup team in their 1994 World Group first round tie against Russia.

Jamie attended Sydney Boys High School, graduating in 1986 before winning a tennis scholarship at the Australian Institute of Sport in 1986.

== ATP career finals ==
=== Singles: 3 (3 runners-up) ===
| Legend Grand Slam tournaments (0–0) ATP World Tour Finals (0–0) ATP Masters Series (0–0) ATP Championship Series(0–0) ATP World Series (0–3) | Finals by surface Hard (0–1) Clay (0–1) Grass (0–0) Carpet (0–1) | Finals by setting Outdoor (0–2) Indoor (0–1) |

| Result | W–L | Date | Tournament | Tier | Surface | Opponent | Score |
|---|---|---|---|---|---|---|---|
| Loss | 0–1 | Aug 1992 | Schenectady, United States | World Series | Hard | (South Africa) Wayne Ferreira | 2–6, 7–6, 2–6 |
| Loss | 0–2 | Oct 1992 | Taipei, Taiwan | World Series | Carpet | (United States) Jim Grabb | 3–6, 3–6 |
| Loss | 0–3 | May 1994 | Coral Springs, United States | World Series | Clay | (Brazil) Luiz Mattar | 4–6, 6–3, 3–6 |

== ATP Challenger and ITF Futures finals ==
=== Singles: 6 (1–5) ===
| Legend ATP Challenger (1–5) ITF Futures (0–0) | Finals by surface Hard (1–2) Clay (0–1) Grass (0–1) Carpet (0–1) |

| Result | W–L | Date | Tournament | Tier | Surface | Opponent | Score |
|---|---|---|---|---|---|---|---|
| Loss | 0–1 | Nov 1990 | Hobart, Australia | Challenger | Carpet | (Australia) Simon Youl | 6–7, 6–7 |
| Win | 1–1 | Dec 1990 | Guam, United States | Challenger | Hard | (United States) Chuck Adams | 6–2, 7–6 |
| Loss | 1–2 | Mar 1991 | San Luis Potosi, Mexico | Challenger | Clay | (Peru) Pablo Arraya | 1–6, 7–5, 3–6 |
| Loss | 1–3 | Dec 1991 | Guam, United States | Challenger | Hard | (United States) Richard Matuszewski | 4–6, ret. |
| Loss | 1–4 | Jul 1992 | Bristol, United Kingdom | Challenger | Grass | (Germany) Patrick Baur | 6–4, 6–7, 1–6 |
| Loss | 1–5 | Aug 1995 | Binghamton, United States | Challenger | Hard | (Japan) Shuzo Matsuoka | 6–2, 6–7, 3–6 |

=== Doubles: 7 (2–5) ===
| Legend ATP Challenger (2–5) ITF Futures (0–0) | Finals by surface Hard (1–2) Clay (0–1) Grass (0–0) Carpet (1–2) |

| Result | W–L | Date | Tournament | Tier | Surface | Partner | Opponents | Score |
|---|---|---|---|---|---|---|---|---|
| Win | 1–0 | Nov 1989 | Hobart, Australia | Challenger | Carpet | (Australia) Todd Woodbridge | (Australia) Roger Rasheed (Australia) Carl Turich | 7–6, 7–6 |
| Loss | 1–1 | Sep 1990 | Canberra, Australia | Challenger | Carpet | (South Africa) David Adams | (Australia) Brett Custer (Australia) Peter Doohan | 3–6, 4–6 |
| Loss | 1–2 | Jun 1991 | Furth, Germany | Challenger | Clay | (Australia) Sandon Stolle | (Spain) Marcos Górriz (Venezuela) Maurice Ruah | 2–6, 4–6 |
| Loss | 1–3 | Nov 1991 | Christchurch, New Zealand | Challenger | Carpet | (Australia) Sandon Stolle | (Australia) Neil Borwick (Australia) Simon Youl | 5–7, 6–7 |
| Win | 2–3 | May 1992 | Kuala Lumpur, Malaysia | Challenger | Hard | (Australia) Sandon Stolle | (United States) Tommy Ho (Australia) Patrick Rafter | 6–4, 7–6 |
| Loss | 2–4 | Aug 1995 | Lexington, United States | Challenger | Hard | (Australia) Andrew Painter | (Netherlands) Fernon Wibier (United States) Chris Woodruff | 5–7, 2–6 |
| Loss | 2–5 | Aug 1995 | Binghamton, United States | Challenger | Hard | (Australia) Neil Borwick | (United States) Scott Humphries (United States) Adam Peterson | 6–7, 2–6 |

== Performance timeline ==
Key
| W | F | SF | QF | #R | RR | Q# | DNQ | A | NH |

(W) winner; (F) finalist; (SF) semifinalist; (QF) quarterfinalist; (#R) rounds 4, 3, 2, 1; (RR) round-robin stage; (Q#) qualification round; (DNQ) did not qualify; (A) absent; (NH) not held; (SR) strike rate (events won / competed); (W–L) win–loss record.

=== Singles ===
| Tournament | 1988 | 1989 | 1990 | 1991 | 1992 | 1993 | 1994 | 1995 | 1996 | SR | W–L | Win % |
|---|---|---|---|---|---|---|---|---|---|---|---|---|
Grand Slam Tournaments
| Australian Open | Q1 | 1R | 1R | 1R | 1R | 3R | 2R | 1R | 1R | 0 / 8 | 3–8 | 27% |
| French Open | A | A | A | A | A | 1R | 1R | 1R | A | 0 / 3 | 0–3 | 0% |
| Wimbledon | A | Q1 | Q1 | Q2 | Q1 | 2R | 1R | 1R | A | 0 / 3 | 1–3 | 25% |
| US Open | A | A | A | A | A | 4R | A | A | A | 0 / 1 | 3–1 | 75% |
| Win–loss | 0–0 | 0–1 | 0–1 | 0–1 | 0–1 | 6–4 | 1–3 | 0–3 | 0–1 | 0 / 15 | 7–15 | 32% |
ATP Tour Masters 1000
| Miami | A | A | A | A | A | A | 2R | A | A | 0 / 1 | 1–1 | 50% |
| Canada | A | A | A | 1R | A | 1R | A | 2R | A | 0 / 3 | 1–3 | 25% |
| Cincinnati | A | A | A | A | A | 3R | A | A | A | 0 / 1 | 2–1 | 67% |
| Win–loss | 0–0 | 0–0 | 0–0 | 0–1 | 0–0 | 2–2 | 1–1 | 1–1 | 0–0 | 0 / 5 | 4–5 | 44% |

== Junior Grand Slam finals ==
=== Doubles: 1 (1 runner-up) ===
| Result | Year | Tournament | Surface | Partner | Opponents | Score |
|---|---|---|---|---|---|---|
| Loss | 1989 | Australian Open | Hard | (Australia) Andrew Kratzmann | (Australia) Johan Anderson (Australia) Todd Woodbridge | 4–6, 2–6 |
