= Shin Han-cheol =

South Korean tennis player

- Country (sports): South Korea
- Born: 23 March 1970 (age 56)
- Prize money: $13,628

Singles
- Career record: 4–10
- Highest ranking: No. 273 (24 October 1994)

Grand Slam singles results
- Australian Open: Q2 (1993)

Doubles
- Career record: 1–3
- Highest ranking: No. 476 (10 September 1990)
Medal record
Representing South Korea
Summer Universiade
Gold medal – first place	1993 Buffalo	Singles

Shin Han-cheol (born 23 March 1970) is a South Korean former professional tennis player.

In the early 1990s, Shin competed in professional tournaments across Asia and reached a best singles ranking of 273 in the world. His most notable performances on the ATP Tour came at the Seoul Open, where he twice won through to the second round. He played in the qualifying draw for the 1993 Australian Open.

Shin was a member of the South Korea Davis Cup team between 1992 and 1994 and appeared in the total of five ties. This included World Group play-offs against CIS in 1992 and Spain in 1993.

A singles gold medalist at the 1993 Summer Universiade in Buffalo, Shin also represented South Korea at the 1994 Asian Games and made the singles quarterfinals.

== Performance timeline ==
Key
W	F	SF	QF	#R	RR	Q#	DNQ	A	NH

(W) winner; (F) finalist; (SF) semifinalist; (QF) quarterfinalist; (#R) rounds 4, 3, 2, 1; (RR) round-robin stage; (Q#) qualification round; (DNQ) did not qualify; (A) absent; (NH) not held; (SR) strike rate (events won / competed); (W–L) win–loss record.

=== Singles ===
Tournament	1993	W–L	Win %
Grand Slam tournaments
Australian Open	Q2	0–0	–
French Open		0–0	–
Wimbledon		0–0	–
US Open		0–0	–
Win–loss		0–0	–

== See also ==
- List of South Korea Davis Cup team representatives
