= Stéphane Simian =

French tennis player

- Country (sports): France
- Residence: Lyon, France
- Born: 8 June 1967 (age 59) Saint-Symphorien-d'Ozon, France
- Height: 1.93 m (6 ft 4 in)
- Turned pro: 1991
- Retired: 1998
- Plays: Left-handed (two-handed backhand)
- Prize money: $796,223

Singles
- Career record: 45–80
- Career titles: 0; 2 Challenger, 0 Futures
- Highest ranking: No. 41 (19 July 1993)

Grand Slam singles results
- Australian Open: 3R (1993)
- French Open: 3R (1997)
- Wimbledon: 2R (1993)
- US Open: 3R (1991)

Doubles
- Career record: 31–48
- Career titles: 2; 5 Challenger, 0 Futures
- Highest ranking: No. 56 (7 November 1994)

Grand Slam doubles results
- Australian Open: 1R (1994)
- French Open: 3R (1994)
- Wimbledon: 2R (1994)
- US Open: 1R (1994)

Grand Slam mixed doubles results
- French Open: 1R (1992, 1993)
- Last updated on: 2 December 2021.

Stéphane Simian (French: [stefan simjɑ̃]; born 8 June 1967) is a former professional tennis player from France. He achieved a career-high singles ranking of world No. 41 in 1993 and a career-high doubles ranking of world No. 56 in 1994.

== ATP career finals ==
=== Singles: 2 (2 runner-ups) ===
Legend Grand Slam Tournaments (0–0) ATP World Tour Finals (0–0) ATP Masters Series (0–0) ATP Championship Series (0–0) ATP World Series (0–2)	Finals by surface Hard (0–1) Clay (0–0) Grass (0–1) Carpet (0–0)	Finals by setting Outdoors (0–2) Indoors (0–0)

Result	W–L	Date	Tournament	Tier	Surface	Opponent	Score
Loss	0–1	Oct 1992	Tel Aviv, Israel	World Series	Hard	(United States) Jeff Tarango	6–4, 3–6, 4–6
Loss	0–2	Jun 1996	Rosmalen, Netherlands	World Series	Grass	(United States) Richey Reneberg	4–6, 0–6

=== Doubles: 3 (2 titles, 1 runner-up) ===
Legend Grand Slam Tournaments (0–0) ATP World Tour Finals (0–0) ATP Masters Series (0–0) ATP Championship Series (0–0) ATP World Series (2–1)	Finals by surface Hard (2–0) Clay (0–1) Grass (0–0) Carpet (0–0)	Finals by setting Outdoors (2–1) Indoors (0–0)

Result	W–L	Date	Tournament	Tier	Surface	Partner	Opponents	Score
Win	1–0	Jan 1994	Doha, Qatar	World Series	Hard	(France) Olivier Delaître	(United States) Shelby Cannon (South Africa) Byron Talbot	6–3, 6–3
Win	2–0	Apr 1994	Seoul, South Korea	World Series	Hard	(United States) Kenny Thorne	(United States) Kent Kinnear (Canada) Sébastien Lareau	6–4, 3–6, 7–5
Loss	2–1	May 1994	Coral Springs, United States	World Series	Clay	(United States) Ken Flach	(South Africa) Lan Bale (New Zealand) Brett Steven	3–6, 5–7

== ATP Challenger and ITF Futures Finals ==
=== Singles: 6 (2–4) ===
Legend ATP Challenger (2–4) ITF Futures (0–0)	Finals by surface Hard (1–4) Clay (0–0) Grass (0–0) Carpet (1–0)

Result	W–L	Date	Tournament	Tier	Surface	Opponent	Score
Loss	0–1	Jul 1991	New Haven, United States	Challenger	Hard	(United States) Alex O'Brien	4–6, 4–6
Loss	0–2	Aug 1992	Istanbul, Turkey	Challenger	Hard	(Sweden) Henrik Holm	6–7, 2–6
Win	1–2	Feb 1993	Rennes, France	Challenger	Carpet	(Sweden) Nicklas Kulti	6–4, 7–6
Loss	1–3	Apr 1996	Sliema, Malta	Challenger	Hard	(Morocco) Hicham Arazi	7–6, 6–7, 0–6
Win	2–3	Apr 1996	Fergana, Uzbekistan	Challenger	Hard	(Israel) Noam Behr	7–6, 7–6
Loss	2–4	May 1996	Andijan, Uzbekistan	Challenger	Hard	(South Africa) Grant Stafford	2–6, 7–6, 4–6

=== Doubles: 7 (5–2) ===
Legend ATP Challenger (5–2) ITF Futures (0–0)	Finals by surface Hard (3–1) Clay (0–0) Grass (1–0) Carpet (1–1)

Result	W–L	Date	Tournament	Tier	Surface	Partner	Opponents	Score
Win	1–0	Aug 1992	Istanbul, Turkey	Challenger	Hard	(France) Bertrand Lemercier	(Argentina) Roberto Saad (The Bahamas) Roger Smith	7–6, 7–6
Win	2–0	Aug 1994	Segovia, Spain	Challenger	Hard	(France) Rodolphe Gilbert	(Spain) Sergio Casal (Spain) Emilio Sánchez	6–4, 3–6, 7–6
Win	3–0	Jul 1995	Bristol, United Kingdom	Challenger	Grass	(France) Lionel Barthez	(Netherlands) Sander Groen (West Germany) Arne Thoms	7–5, 7–5
Win	4–0	Sep 1996	Olbia, Italy	Challenger	Hard	(Italy) Nicola Bruno	(United States) Geoff Grant (Venezuela) Maurice Ruah	7–5, 6–4
Win	5–0	Jan 1997	Heilbronn, Germany	Challenger	Carpet	(France) Olivier Delaître	(Germany) Patrick Baur (South Africa) Clinton Ferreira	6–7, 6–3, 7–6
Loss	5–1	Feb 1998	Lübeck, Germany	Challenger	Carpet	(Finland) Tuomas Ketola	(Switzerland) Lorenzo Manta (United Kingdom) Andrew Richardson	6–7, 2–6
Loss	5–2	Mar 1998	Cherbourg, France	Challenger	Hard	(France) Jean-Philippe Fleurian	(Italy) Massimo Ardinghi (Italy) Massimo Bertolini	3–6, 6–2, 4–6

== Performance timelines ==
Key
W	F	SF	QF	#R	RR	Q#	DNQ	A	NH

(W) winner; (F) finalist; (SF) semifinalist; (QF) quarterfinalist; (#R) rounds 4, 3, 2, 1; (RR) round-robin stage; (Q#) qualification round; (DNQ) did not qualify; (A) absent; (NH) not held; (SR) strike rate (events won / competed); (W–L) win–loss record.

=== Singles ===
Tournament	1991	1992	1993	1994	1995	1996	1997	1998	SR	W–L	Win %
Grand Slam tournaments
Australian Open	A	A	3R	3R	A	A	2R	A	0 / 3	5–3	63%
French Open	A	1R	1R	1R	Q1	1R	3R	Q1	0 / 5	2–5	29%
Wimbledon	Q3	Q2	2R	1R	1R	A	Q2	A	0 / 3	1–3	25%
US Open	3R	Q2	1R	Q2	Q2	1R	Q2	Q1	0 / 3	2–3	40%
Win–loss	2–1	0–1	3–4	2–3	0–1	0–2	3–2	0–0	0 / 14	10–14	42%
ATP Masters Series
Monte Carlo	A	A	A	A	Q1	A	A	A	0 / 0	0–0	–
Canada	A	A	1R	A	A	A	A	A	0 / 1	0–1	0%
Cincinnati	A	A	1R	A	A	A	A	A	0 / 1	0–1	0%
Paris	A	A	A	A	A	Q1	Q1	A	0 / 0	0–0	–
Win–loss	0–0	0–0	0–2	0–0	0–0	0–0	0–8	0–0	0 / 2	0–2	0%

=== Doubles ===
Tournament	1991	1992	1993	1994	1995	1996	1997	1998	SR	W–L	Win %
Grand Slam tournaments
Australian Open	A	A	A	1R	A	A	A	A	0 / 1	0–1	0%
French Open	A	A	1R	3R	1R	1R	2R	1R	0 / 6	3–6	33%
Wimbledon	Q1	Q1	A	2R	A	A	1R	A	0 / 2	1–2	33%
US Open	A	A	A	1R	A	A	A	A	0 / 1	0–1	0%
Win–loss	0–0	0–0	0–1	3–4	0–1	0–1	1–2	0–1	0 / 10	4–10	29%
ATP Masters Series
Paris	A	A	A	A	A	A	1R	A	0 / 1	0–1	0%
Win–loss	0–0	0–0	0–0	0–0	0–0	0–0	0–1	0–0	0 / 1	0–1	0%
