= Seoul Open =

Defunct tennis tournament
- Event name: Seoul Open (1987–89, 1995–96); KAL Cup Korea Open (1990–94)
- Tour: Grand Prix circuit (1987–89); ATP Tour (1990–96)
- Founded: 1987
- Abolished: 1996
- Editions: 10
- Location: Seoul, South Korea
- Surface: Hard

The Seoul Open was a Grand Prix and ATP Tour affiliated men's tennis tournament played from 1987 to 1996. It was held at the Seoul Olympic Park Tennis Center in Seoul in South Korea and played on outdoor hardcourts.

== Past finals ==
The winners and runners-up were as follows:

=== Singles ===
Year	Champions	Runners-up	Score
1987	(United States) Jim Grabb	(United States) Andre Agassi	1–6, 6–4, 6–2
1988	(United States) Dan Goldie	(United Kingdom) Andrew Castle	6–3, 6–7, 6–0
1989	(United States) Robert Van't Hof	(Australia) Brad Drewett	7–5, 6–4
1990	(Austria) Alex Antonitsch	(Australia) Pat Cash	7–6, 6–3
1991	(Germany) Patrick Baur	(United States) Jeff Tarango	6–4, 1–6, 7–6
1992	(Japan) Shuzo Matsuoka	(Australia) Todd Woodbridge	6–3, 4–6, 7–5
1993	(United States) Chuck Adams	(Australia) Todd Woodbridge	6–4, 6–4
1994	(United Kingdom) Jeremy Bates	(Germany) Jörn Renzenbrink	6–4, 6–7, 6–3
1995	(Canada) Greg Rusedski	(Germany) Lars Rehmann	6–4, 3–1 ret.
1996	(Zimbabwe) Byron Black	(Czech Republic) Martin Damm	7–6, 6–3

=== Doubles ===
Year	Champions	Runners-up	Score
1987	(United States) Eric Korita (United States) Mike Leach	(United States) Ken Flach (United States) Jim Grabb	6–7, 6–1, 7–5
1988	(United Kingdom) Andrew Castle (Argentina) Roberto Saad	(United States) Gary Donnelly (United States) Jim Grabb	6–7, 6–4, 7–6
1989	(United States) Scott Davis (Kenya) Paul Wekesa	(United States) John Letts (United States) Bruce Man-Son-Hing	6–2, 6–4
1990	(Canada) Grant Connell (Canada) Glenn Michibata	(Australia) Jason Stoltenberg (Australia) Todd Woodbridge	7–6, 6–4
1991	(Austria) Alex Antonitsch (Israel) Gilad Bloom	(United States) Kent Kinnear (United States) Sven Salumaa	7–6, 6–1
1992	(United States) Kevin Curren (South Africa) Gary Muller	(New Zealand) Kelly Evernden (United States) Brad Pearce	7–6, 6–4
1993	(Sweden) Jan Apell (Sweden) Peter Nyborg	(United Kingdom) Neil Broad (South Africa) Gary Muller	5–7, 7–6, 6–2
1994	(France) Stéphane Simian (United States) Kenny Thorne	(United States) Kent Kinnear (Canada) Sébastien Lareau	6–4, 3–6, 7–5
1995	(Canada) Sébastien Lareau (United States) Jeff Tarango	(Australia) Joshua Eagle (Australia) Andrew Florent	6–3, 6–2
1996	(United States) Rick Leach (United States) Jonathan Stark	(United States) Kent Kinnear (Zimbabwe) Kevin Ullyett	6–4, 6–4
