= Kenny Thorne =

American tennis player

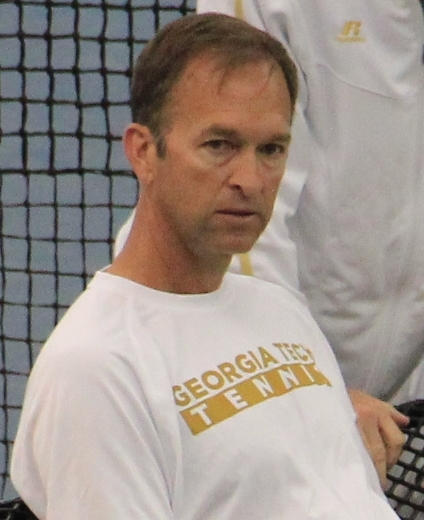
- Kenny Thorne, coaching The Yellow Jackets in the 2014 season
- Country (sports): United States
- Born: January 24, 1966 (age 59); Honolulu, Hawaii
- Height: 1.88 m (6 ft 2 in)
- Turned pro: 1988
- Retired: 1997
- Plays: Right-handed (one-handed backhand)
- Prize money: $1,587,294

Singles
- Career record: 14–38
- Career titles: 0
- Highest ranking: No. 121 (July 19, 1993)

Grand Slam singles results
- Australian Open: R128 (1994, 1995)
- Wimbledon: R64 (1994)
- US Open: R128 (1993)

Doubles
- Career record: 54–83
- Career titles: 2
- Highest ranking: No. 67 (April 17, 1995)

Grand Slam doubles results
- Australian Open: R16 (1995)
- French Open: R16 (1995)
- Wimbledon: QF (1994)
- US Open: R32 (1994, 1995)

Kenny Thorne (born January 24, 1966) is a former professional tennis player from the United States. Thorne played collegiately for Georgia Tech from 1985 to 1988, and then played professionally from 1989 to 1997. He is currently the head coach of the Georgia Tech Yellow Jackets men's tennis team.

== College career ==
Thorne played four seasons for Georgia Tech and saw success both as a singles and doubles player. In doubles, he competed in the 1988 NCAA doubles tournament with partner, Bryan Shelton, after a 24-win doubles season. Thorne finished with 75 career doubles wins (all matches).

As a singles player, he finished with a .717 career win percentage (all matches)– 10th highest in school history. He won an ACC singles championship in 1986. Thorne qualified for the NCAA singles tournament twice, in 1986 and 1988. He finished as the Georgia Tech career leader in singles victories (all matches) with 112 wins (a record later broken by one of his players, Guillermo Gomez).

Thorne was named an ITA All-American in 1988. In the same year, he was awarded the ITA John Van Nostrand Memorial Award. He finished his Georgia Tech playing career as a four-time All-ACC honoree. He was also twice named captain of the team and was an Academic All-ACC honoree. Kenny Thorne was later inducted into the Georgia Tech Athletic Hall of Fame in 1995.

=== College singles records ===
- Season wins (dual matches): 22, 1987–88
- Season wins (all matches): 43, 1987–88

== Professional career ==
Thorne enjoyed most of his tennis success while playing doubles. During his career, he won two doubles titles, and achieved a career-high doubles ranking of world No. 67 in 1995.

== Coaching ==
Thorne was named the head coach of the Yellow Jackets men's tennis team in 1998. His team has reached the NCAA Championship Tournament 12 times in his 18 years as head coach. He has twice been named ACC Coach of the Year– 1999 and 2017. In 2011, he was awarded ITA National Coach of the Year.

== Personal life ==
Kenny Thorne is married to former Georgia Tech cross country standout and inductee to the school's Hall of Fame, Bridget Koster. They have four children, two daughters, Rachel and Kenedy, and two sons, Zachary and Daniel. Rachel is currently a distance runner on the Yellow Jacket track team. Kenny Thorne earned an Industrial Engineering degree from Georgia Tech in 1989.

== Career finals ==
=== Doubles: 2 (2 titles) ===
| Result | W/L | Date | Tournament | Surface | Partner | Opponents | Score |
|---|---|---|---|---|---|---|---|
| Win | 1–0 | Apr 1994 | Seoul, South Korea | Hard | (France) Stéphane Simian | (United States) Kent Kinnear (Canada) Sébastien Lareau | 6–4, 3–6, 7–5 |
| Win | 2–0 | Jun 1994 | Florence, Italy | Clay | (Australia) Jon Ireland | (United Kingdom) Neil Broad (United States) Greg Van Emburgh | 7–6, 6–3 |

== See also ==
- Georgia Tech Yellow Jackets
- List of Georgia Institute of Technology athletes
