= 1990 Sanremo Open – Singles =

Singles
- 1990 Sanremo Open

Final
- Champion: (Spain) Jordi Arrese
- Runner-up: (Spain) Juan Aguilera
- Score: 6–2, 6–2

Details
- Draw: 32 (3WC/4Q)
- Seeds: 8

Events
Singles	Doubles
Sanremo Open

Seventh-seeded Jordi Arrese defeated Juan Aguilera 6–2, 6–2 in the final to secure the title.

== Seeds ==
1. (Argentina) Guillermo Pérez Roldán (quarterfinals)
2. (Spain) Juan Aguilera (final)
3. (Socialist Federal Republic of Yugoslavia) Goran Prpić (second round)
4. (Uruguay) Marcelo Filippini (semifinals)
5. (Haiti) Ronald Agénor (first round)
6. (Argentina) Franco Davín (first round)
7. (Spain) Jordi Arrese (champion)
8. (Italy) Omar Camporese (quarterfinals)

== Draw ==
=== Key ===
- Q = Qualifier
- WC = Wild card
- LL = Lucky loser
- Alt = Alternate
- SE = Special exempt
- PR = Protected ranking
- ITF = ITF entry
- JE = Junior exempt
- w/o = Walkover
- r = Retired
- d = Defaulted
- SR = Special ranking

=== Finals ===
Semifinals
7	(Spain) Jordi Arrese	6	6
4	(Uruguay) Marcelo Filippini	2	3
(Argentina) Roberto Azar	6^{2}	2
2	(Spain) Juan Aguilera	7^{7}	6

Final
7	(Spain) Jordi Arrese	6	6
2	(Spain) Juan Aguilera	2	2

=== Section 1 ===
First round
1	(Argentina) G Pérez Roldán	5	7	6
(France) F Santoro	7	6	2
(Finland) A Rahunen	6	6
(France) O Delaître	4	3
Q	(Italy) D Balducci	6	4
(Italy) S Pescosolido	7	6
(France) C Pioline	4	2
7	(Spain) J Arrese	6	6
4	(Uruguay) M Filippini	6	2	7
(France) T Champion	2	6	6
(France) T Benhabiles	1	7	7
(France) T Tulasne	6	6	5
(Germany) C Geyer	5	1
WC	(Sweden) N Utgren	7	6
(Italy) R Furlan	4	6	7
5	(Haiti) R Agénor	6	2	6

Second round
1	(Argentina) G Pérez Roldán	0	7	6
(Finland) A Rahunen	6	5	1
(Italy) S Pescosolido	7	2	2
7	(Spain) J Arrese	5	6	6
4	(Uruguay) M Filippini	2	6	7
(France) T Benhabiles	6	4	5
WC	(Sweden) N Utgren	1	3
(Italy) R Furlan	6	6

Quarterfinals
1	(Argentina) G Pérez Roldán	4	2
7	(Spain) J Arrese	6	6
4	(Uruguay) M Filippini	6	6
(Italy) R Furlan	1	3

Semifinals
7	(Spain) J Arrese	6	6
4	(Uruguay) M Filippini	2	3

=== Section 2 ===
First round
6	(Argentina) F Davín	6	5	3
WC	(Switzerland) C Mezzadri	1	7	6
(Spain) J Altur	6	6
Q	(France) S Sansoni	2	0
(Sweden) C Bergström	2	2
(Argentina) R Azar	6	6
WC	(Italy) F Mordegan	5	2
3	(Socialist Federal Republic of Yugoslavia) G Prpić	7	6
8	(Italy) O Camporese	6	6
(France) J Potier	3	0
(Germany) K Braasch	0	1
(Czechoslovakia) S Doseděl	6	6
(Argentina) F Yunis	6	6
Q	(Sweden) O Jonsson	1	2
Q	(Romania) M Năstase	0	3
2	(Spain) J Aguilera	6	6

Second round
WC	(Switzerland) C Mezzadri	2	6	6
(Spain) J Altur	6	1	2
(Argentina) R Azar	7	6
3	(Socialist Federal Republic of Yugoslavia) G Prpić	5	2
8	(Italy) O Camporese	6	6
(Czechoslovakia) S Doseděl	0	3
(Argentina) F Yunis	6	4	0
2	(Spain) J Aguilera	3	6	6

Quarterfinals
WC	(Switzerland) C Mezzadri	6^{6}	6^{10}
(Argentina) R Azar	7^{8}	7^{12}
8	(Italy) O Camporese	3	2
2	(Spain) J Aguilera	6	6

Semifinals
(Argentina) R Azar	6^{2}	2
2	(Spain) J Aguilera	7^{7}	6
