= 1990 Sanremo Open – Doubles =

Doubles
- 1990 Sanremo Open

Final
- Champions: (Romania) Mihnea-Ion Năstase (Socialist Federal Republic of Yugoslavia) Goran Prpić
- Runners-up: (Sweden) Ola Jonsson (Sweden) Fredrik Nilsson
- Score: 3–6, 7–5, 6–3

Details
- Draw: 16
- Seeds: 4

Events
Singles	Doubles
Sanremo Open

In the sole edition of the tournament, Mihnea-Ion Năstase and Goran Prpić won the title by defeating Ola Jonsson and Fredrik Nilsson 3–6, 7–5, 6–3 in the final.

== Seeds ==
1. (Italy) Federico Mordegan / (Sweden) Nicklas Utgren (first round)
2. (Uruguay) Marcelo Filippini / (Argentina) Guillermo Pérez Roldán (first round)
3. (Venezuela) Alfonso Mora / (Sweden) Tobias Svantesson (first round)
4. (Sweden) Ola Jonsson / (Sweden) Fredrik Nilsson (final)

== Draw ==
=== Key ===
- Q = Qualifier
- WC = Wild card
- LL = Lucky loser
- Alt = Alternate
- SE = Special exempt
- PR = Protected ranking
- ITF = ITF entry
- JE = Junior exempt
- w/o = Walkover
- r = Retired
- d = Defaulted
- SR = Special ranking

=== Draw ===
First round
1	(Italy) F Mordegan (Sweden) N Utgren	6	6
(France) T Benhabiles (France) C Pioline	7	7
Q	(Italy) D Balducci (Italy) A Zugarelli	6	3	2
(Italy) Stefano Colombo (Italy) Massimiliano Grancini	4	6	6
4	(Sweden) O Jonsson (Sweden) F Nilsson	6	6
(France) F Santoro (France) T Tulasne	0	1
(Italy) N Bruno (Italy) S Pescosolido	6	3	4
(Spain) J Aguilera (Spain) J Arrese	3	6	6
LL	(Italy) Stefano Caroni (Italy) Alessandro Fornaro	5	1
(Romania) MI Năstase (Socialist Federal Republic of Yugoslavia) G Prpić	7	6
(Italy) R Furlan (Switzerland) C Mezzadri	7	6
3	(Venezuela) A Mora (Sweden) T Svantesson	6	3
(Italy) Marcello Bassanelli (Italy) E Rossetti	7	6
(Sweden) N Holm (Argentina) F Yunis	6	4
(Argentina) R Azar (Italy) O Camporese	2	6	6
2	(Uruguay) M Filippini (Argentina) G Pérez Roldán	6	1	2

Quarterfinals
(France) T Benhabiles (France) C Pioline	3	6	6
(Italy) Stefano Colombo (Italy) Massimiliano Grancini	6	1	2
4	(Sweden) O Jonsson (Sweden) F Nilsson	6	7
(Spain) J Aguilera (Spain) J Arrese	1	5
(Romania) MI Năstase (Socialist Federal Republic of Yugoslavia) G Prpić	7	6
(Italy) R Furlan (Switzerland) C Mezzadri	6	3
(Italy) Marcello Bassanelli (Italy) E Rossetti	3	6	7
(Argentina) R Azar (Italy) O Camporese	6	3	6

Semifinals
(France) T Benhabiles (France) C Pioline	2	6	5
4	(Sweden) O Jonsson (Sweden) F Nilsson	6	4	7
(Romania) MI Năstase (Socialist Federal Republic of Yugoslavia) G Prpić	6	7
(Italy) Marcello Bassanelli (Italy) E Rossetti	2	5

Final
4	(Sweden) O Jonsson (Sweden) F Nilsson	6	6	3
(Romania) MI Năstase (Socialist Federal Republic of Yugoslavia) G Prpić	3	7	6
