= 1992 US Open – Men's singles qualifying =

Men's singles qualifying
- 1992 US Open

Events
Singles	men	women		boys	girls
Doubles	men	women	mixed	boys	girls
WC Singles	men	women	quad
WC Doubles	men	women	quad
Legends	men	women	mixed

Qualification
Singles	men	women
- US Open

Players who neither had high enough rankings nor received wild cards to enter the main draw of the annual US Open Tennis Championships participated in a qualifying tournament held over several days before the event.

== Seeds ==
1. (Sweden) Thomas Enqvist (first round)
2. (Denmark) Kenneth Carlsen (second round)
3. (South Africa) Marcos Ondruska (first round)
4. (New Zealand) Brett Steven (qualifying competition)
5. (France) Thierry Guardiola (second round)
6. (France) Stéphane Simian (second round)
7. (Argentina) Martin Stringari (second round)
8. (Israel) Gilad Bloom (second round)
9. (Canada) Greg Rusedski (first round)
10. (Brazil) Danilo Marcelino (first round)
11. (Sweden) David Engel (second round)
12. (Spain) Jordi Burillo (first round)
13. (Sweden) Jan Apell (first round)
14. (Germany) Christian Saceanu (second round)
15. (Sweden) Thomas Högstedt (second round; withdrew)
16. (Australia) John Fitzgerald (first round)
17. (Canada) Grant Connell (second round)
18. (Venezuela) Maurice Ruah (first round)
19. (New Zealand) Kelly Evernden (first round)
20. (Australia) Carl Limberger (second round)
21. (Czechoslovakia) Ctislav Doseděl (qualified)
22. (Italy) Cristiano Caratti (qualified)
23. (United States) Jimmy Brown (qualified)
24. (Mexico) Oliver Fernández (first round)
25. (Venezuela) Nicolás Pereira (first round)
26. (Czechoslovakia) Daniel Vacek (first round)
27. (Chile) Felipe Rivera (qualified)
28. (Germany) Jörn Renzenbrink (second round)
29. (Canada) Martin Laurendeau (first round)
30. (France) Stéphane Sansoni (first round)
31. (The Bahamas) Roger Smith (qualifying competition)
32. (Netherlands) Tom Nijssen (second round)

== Qualifiers ==
1. (United States) Tommy Ho
2. (Sweden) Mikael Pernfors
3. (United States) David DiLucia
4. (United States) Todd Nelson
5. (Chile) Felipe Rivera
6. (Brazil) Fernando Meligeni
7. (Argentina) Pablo Albano
8. (Norway) Christian Ruud
9. (United States) Jimmy Brown
10. (Spain) Alejo Mancisidor
11. (Czechoslovakia) Ctislav Doseděl
12. (Italy) Cristiano Caratti
13. (United States) Scott Davis
14. (Canada) Andrew Sznajder
15. (South Africa) Dick Bosse
16. (South Africa) Ellis Ferreira

== Qualifying draw ==
Key

- Q = Qualifier
- WC = Wild card
- LL = Lucky loser
- Alt = Alternate
- ITF = ITF entry
- PR = Protected ranking
- SR = Special ranking
- SE = Special exempt
- JE = Junior exempt
- JR = Junior Accelerator Programme entrant
- CO = College Accelerator Programme entrant
- NG = Next Gen Accelerator Program entrant
- w/o = Walkover
- r = Retired
- d = Defaulted

=== First qualifier ===
First round
1	(Sweden) Thomas Enqvist	0	3
WC	(United States) Doug Flach	6	6
(South Africa) Clinton Marsh	4	0^{r}
(United States) Tommy Ho	6	3
(Netherlands) Hendrik Jan Davids	6	4
(India) Leander Paes	7	6
Alt	(Mexico) Agustín Moreno	4	6
32	(Netherlands) Tom Nijssen	6	7

Second round
WC	(United States) Doug Flach	4	4
(United States) Tommy Ho	6	6
(India) Leander Paes	4	6	6
32	(Netherlands) Tom Nijssen	6	4	1

Qualifying competition
(United States) Tommy Ho	7	6
(India) Leander Paes	5	2

=== Second qualifier ===
First round
2	(Denmark) Kenneth Carlsen	6	6
(Italy) Paolo Pambianco	3	3
(South Africa) Grant Stafford	4	2
(Sweden) Mikael Pernfors	6	6
(Italy) Pietro Pennisi	7	6
(United Kingdom) Chris Bailey	5	3
(Sweden) Peter Lundgren	1	1
31	(The Bahamas) Roger Smith	6	6

Second round
2	(Denmark) Kenneth Carlsen	4	4
(Sweden) Mikael Pernfors	6	6
(Italy) Pietro Pennisi	3	0
31	(The Bahamas) Roger Smith	6	6

Qualifying competition
(Sweden) Mikael Pernfors	2	6	6
31	(The Bahamas) Roger Smith	6	4	0

=== Third qualifier ===
First round
3	(South Africa) Marcos Ondruska	6	5
WC	(United States) David DiLucia	7	7
(United States) Kent Kinnear	4	2
(United States) Phil Williamson	6	6
(The Bahamas) Mark Knowles	6	7	6
(Canada) Glenn Michibata	7	5	4
(South Africa) Marius Barnard	6	7
30	(France) Stéphane Sansoni	3	5

Second round
WC	(United States) David DiLucia	4	6	7
(United States) Phil Williamson	6	2	6
(The Bahamas) Mark Knowles	6	6
(South Africa) Marius Barnard	3	3

Qualifying competition
WC	(United States) David DiLucia	6	6
(The Bahamas) Mark Knowles	3	2

=== Fourth qualifier ===
First round
4	(New Zealand) Brett Steven	6	6
(Italy) Silvio Scaiola	2	3
(Brazil) José Daher	1	0
(Italy) Francesco Michelotti	6	6
(Israel) Michael Daniel	6	4	6
(United States) Todd Nelson	1	6	7
(Puerto Rico) Miguel Nido	4	6	6
29	(Canada) Martin Laurendeau	6	3	2

Second round
4	(New Zealand) Brett Steven	6	6
(Italy) Francesco Michelotti	3	1
(United States) Todd Nelson	6	3	6
(Puerto Rico) Miguel Nido	1	6	1

Qualifying competition
4	(New Zealand) Brett Steven	6	3	3
(United States) Todd Nelson	3	6	6

=== Fifth qualifier ===
First round
5	(France) Thierry Guardiola	6	6
(Italy) Daniele Balducci	4	0
(South Africa) Robbie Koenig	4	6	5
(Australia) Grant Doyle	6	2	7
(Australia) Pat Rafter	0	0^{r}
(United States) Richard Schmidt	6	3
(India) Ramesh Krishnan	6	6	1
27	(Chile) Felipe Rivera	7	0	6

Second round
5	(France) Thierry Guardiola	3	2
(Australia) Grant Doyle	6	6
(United States) Richard Schmidt	3	1
27	(Chile) Felipe Rivera	6	6

Qualifying competition
(Australia) Grant Doyle	1	2
27	(Chile) Felipe Rivera	6	6

=== Sixth qualifier ===
First round
6	(France) Stéphane Simian	6	1	7
(Brazil) Nelson Aerts	3	6	5
(Australia) Brent Larkham	2	4
(United States) David Pate	6	6
(Brazil) Fernando Meligeni	6	6
(Argentina) Miguel Pastura	2	3
(Argentina) Roberto Saad	4	3
28	(Germany) Jörn Renzenbrink	6	6

Second round
6	(France) Stéphane Simian	7	4	1
(United States) David Pate	6	6	6
(Brazil) Fernando Meligeni	6	6
28	(Germany) Jörn Renzenbrink	2	3

Qualifying competition
(United States) David Pate	7	5	2
(Brazil) Fernando Meligeni	5	7	6

=== Seventh qualifier ===
First round
7	(Argentina) Martin Stringari	7	6
(Latvia) Ģirts Dzelde	5	0
(United States) Pat Crow	6	1
(Italy) Ettore Rossetti	7	6
(United States) Buff Farrow	6	6
(Australia) Wayne Arthurs	3	3
(Argentina) Pablo Albano	6	3	7
26	(Czechoslovakia) Daniel Vacek	4	6	6

Second round
7	(Argentina) Martin Stringari	6	6
(Italy) Ettore Rossetti	7	7
(United States) Buff Farrow	4	6	4
(Argentina) Pablo Albano	6	1	6

Qualifying competition
(Italy) Ettore Rossetti	4	3
(Argentina) Pablo Albano	6	6

=== Eighth qualifier ===
First round
8	(Israel) Gilad Bloom	6	6
(Canada) Martin Wostenholme	4	4
(Norway) Christian Ruud	7	6
(United States) Kenny Thorne	5	2
(United States) Al Parker	6	6
(Brazil) Roberto Jabali	4	1
(Australia) Neil Borwick	6	6
25	(Venezuela) Nicolás Pereira	4	2

Second round
8	(Israel) Gilad Bloom	4	2
(Norway) Christian Ruud	6	6
(United States) Al Parker	0^{r}
(Australia) Neil Borwick	6

Qualifying competition
(Norway) Christian Ruud	6	6
(Australia) Neil Borwick	2	3

=== Ninth qualifier ===
First round
9	(Canada) Greg Rusedski	3	3
(United States) Brian MacPhie	6	6
(Spain) Daniel Marco	3	2
WC	(United States) Jack Waite	6	6
(Israel) Oren Motevassel	3	0
(United States) Donald Johnson	6	6
WC	(United States) Vince Spadea	6	6
23	(United States) Jimmy Brown	7	7

Second round
(United States) Brian MacPhie	6	6
WC	(United States) Jack Waite	2	3
(United States) Donald Johnson	6	1
23	(United States) Jimmy Brown	7	6

Qualifying competition
(United States) Brian MacPhie	4	6	4
23	(United States) Jimmy Brown	6	3	6

=== Tenth qualifier ===
First round
10	(Brazil) Danilo Marcelino	6	7	3
WC	(United States) Wade McGuire	7	6	6
(Czechoslovakia) Libor Němeček	6	6	1
(United States) Bret Garnett	4	7	6
(Netherlands) Jacco Van Duyn	3	2
(United States) David Witt	6	6
(Spain) Alejo Mancisidor	6	6
24	(Mexico) Oliver Fernández	4	1

Second round
WC	(United States) Wade McGuire	7	6
(United States) Bret Garnett	5	2
(United States) David Witt	6	6	2
(Spain) Alejo Mancisidor	4	7	6

Qualifying competition
WC	(United States) Wade McGuire	0	6
(Spain) Alejo Mancisidor	6	7

=== Eleventh qualifier ===
First round
11	(Sweden) David Engel	7	6
(South Africa) Kevin Ullyett	6	2
(United Kingdom) Danny Sapsford	6	5	2
(United States) Steve DeVries	2	7	6
(United States) Chris Garner	7	4	2
(Australia) Roger Rasheed	6	6	6
(Sweden) Lars-Anders Wahlgren	6	0	1
21	(Czechoslovakia) Ctislav Doseděl	3	6	6

Second round
11	(Sweden) David Engel	4	6	6
(United States) Steve DeVries	6	2	7
(Australia) Roger Rasheed	4	6
21	(Czechoslovakia) Ctislav Doseděl	6	7

Qualifying competition
(United States) Steve DeVries	3	4
21	(Czechoslovakia) Ctislav Doseděl	6	6

=== Twelfth qualifier ===
First round
12	(Spain) Jordi Burillo	2	3
(Netherlands) Joost Wijnhoud	6	6
(Sweden) Patrik Albertsson	6	6
(Germany) Florian Krumrey	4	1
(South Africa) John-Laffnie de Jager	6	6
WC	(United States) Ivan Baron	3	4
(Italy) Marco Meneschincheri	7	0	2
22	(Italy) Cristiano Caratti	6	6	6

Second round
(Netherlands) Joost Wijnhoud	3	6
(Sweden) Patrik Albertsson	6	7
(South Africa) John-Laffnie de Jager	4	1
22	(Italy) Cristiano Caratti	6	6

Qualifying competition
(Sweden) Patrik Albertsson	3	6
22	(Italy) Cristiano Caratti	6	7

=== Thirteenth qualifier ===
First round
13	(Sweden) Jan Apell	3	4
(United States) Scott Davis	6	6
(France) Laurent Prades	7	6
(Czechoslovakia) Tomáš Anzari	5	3
(South Africa) Mark Kaplan	6	6
(Romania) Mihnea-Ion Năstase	3	4
WC	(United States) Michael Joyce	6	0	5
20	(Australia) Carl Limberger	0	6	7

Second round
(United States) Scott Davis	6	2	6
(France) Laurent Prades	4	6	3
(South Africa) Mark Kaplan	5	6	6
20	(Australia) Carl Limberger	7	4	1

Qualifying competition
(United States) Scott Davis	7	1	6
(South Africa) Mark Kaplan	6	6	1

=== Fourteenth qualifier ===
First round
14	(Germany) Christian Saceanu	6	6
WC	(United States) Marshall Burroughs	4	1
(Canada) Sébastien Lareau	3	2
(Morocco) Younes El Aynaoui	6	6
(Germany) Michael Geserer	4	0
(Canada) Andrew Sznajder	6	6
(United Kingdom) Andrew Castle	6	3	6
19	(New Zealand) Kelly Evernden	4	6	2

Second round
14	(Germany) Christian Saceanu	6	2	5
(Morocco) Younes El Aynaoui	2	6	7
(Canada) Andrew Sznajder	7	7
(United Kingdom) Andrew Castle	6	6

Qualifying competition
(Morocco) Younes El Aynaoui	3	4
(Canada) Andrew Sznajder	6	6

=== Fifteenth qualifier ===
First round
15	(Sweden) Thomas Högstedt	6	6
(United States) Dave Randall	2	4
(Argentina) Hector Moretti	0	3
(Argentina) Luis Lobo	6	6
(Argentina) Patricio Arnold	3	2
(South Africa) Dick Bosse	6	6
(Sweden) Johan Carlsson	6	3
17	(Canada) Grant Connell	7	6

Second round
15	(Sweden) Thomas Högstedt
(Argentina) Luis Lobo	w/o
(South Africa) Dick Bosse	7	7
17	(Canada) Grant Connell	5	6

Qualifying competition
(Argentina) Luis Lobo	6	5	4
(South Africa) Dick Bosse	3	7	6

=== Sixteenth qualifier ===
First round
16	(Australia) John Fitzgerald	4	3
(Canada) Daniel Nestor	6	6
(Ivory Coast) Clément N’Goran	3	2
(United Kingdom) Mark Petchey	6	6
(South Africa) Ellis Ferreira	7	7
WC	(United States) Steve Campbell	5	6
(France) Lionel Roux	7	6
18	(Venezuela) Maurice Ruah	6	4

Second round
(Canada) Daniel Nestor	6	6
(United Kingdom) Mark Petchey	3	2
(South Africa) Ellis Ferreira	7	6
(France) Lionel Roux	5	4

Qualifying competition
(Canada) Daniel Nestor	6	3
(South Africa) Ellis Ferreira	7	6
