= ATP International Series =

Tennis tournament category (2000–2008)

The ATP International Series (known from 1990 to 1999 as the ATP World Series) was a series of professional tennis tournaments held internationally as part of the ATP Tour from 2000 to 2008.

The series was renamed ATP Tour 250 in 2009. International Series offered players cash prizes (tournaments have purses from $416,000 to $1,000,000) and the ability to earn ATP ranking points. They generally offered less prize money and fewer points than the ATP International Series Gold, but more than tournaments on the ATP Challenger Series.

== Tournaments ==
The locations and titles of these tournaments were subject to change every year. The tournaments – in calendar order – in 2008 were:

Tournament	Location	Court surface	Prize money (US$)	Draw size	First played
Next Generation Adelaide International	Adelaide, Australia	Hard	$419,000	32	1972
Qatar ExxonMobil Open	Doha, Qatar	Hard	$1,000,000	32	1993
Chennai Open	Chennai, India	Hard	$436,000	32	1996
Medibank International	Sydney, Australia	Hard	$436,000	32	1885
Heineken Open	Auckland, New Zealand	Hard	$436,000	32	1956
Zagreb Indoors	Zagreb, Croatia	Carpet (indoor)	$416,000	32	2006
International Tennis Championships	Delray Beach, Florida, USA	Hard	$416,000	32	1993
Movistar Open	Viña del Mar, Chile	Clay	$448,000	32	1993
Open 13	Marseille, France	Hard (indoor)	$600,000	32	1993
Brasil Open	Costa do Sauipe, Bahia, Brazil	Clay	$456,000	32	2001
SAP Open	San Jose, California, USA	Hard (indoor)	$416,000	32	1889
Copa Telmex ATP Buenos Aires	Buenos Aires, Argentina	Clay	$600,000	32	1968
Tennis Channel Open	Las Vegas, Nevada, USA	Hard	$416,000	32	1986
Open de Tenis Comunidad Valenciana	Valencia, Spain	Clay	$416,000	32	1995
U.S. Men's Clay Court Championships	Houston, Texas, USA	Clay	$416,000	32	1910
Grand Prix Hassan II	Casablanca, Morocco	Clay	$416,000	32	1984
BMW Open	Munich, Germany	Clay	$416,000	32	1900
Portugal Open	Oeiras, Portugal	Clay	$625,000	32	1990
Hypo Group Tennis International	Pörtschach, Austria	Clay	$416,000	32	1981
Aegon Championships	London, Great Britain	Grass	$800,000	56	1890
Gerry Weber Open	Halle, Germany	Grass	$800,000	32	1991
Nottingham Open	Nottingham, Great Britain	Grass	$416,000	32	1995
Ordina Open	's-Hertogenbosch, Netherlands	Grass	$416,000	32	1990
Hall of Fame Championships	Newport, Rhode Island, USA	Grass	$416,000	32	1976
Suisse Open	Gstaad, Switzerland	Clay	$496,000	32	1915
Swedish Open	Båstad, Sweden	Clay	$416,000	32	1948
Dutch Open	Amersfoort, Netherlands	Clay	$416,000	32	1957
Countrywide Classic	Los Angeles, USA	Hard	$525,000	32	1927
Croatia Open	Umag, Croatia	Clay	$416,000	32	1990
Indianapolis Tennis Championships	Indianapolis, Indiana, USA	Hard	$525,000	32	1988
Orange Prokom Open	Sopot/Warsaw, Poland	Clay	$500,000	32	2001
Legg Mason Tennis Classic	Washington, D.C., USA	Hard	$600,000	48	1969
Pilot Pen Tennis	New Haven, Connecticut, USA	Hard	$675,000	48	1985
China Open	Beijing, China	Hard	$500,000	32	1993
BCR Open Romania	Bucharest, Romania	Clay	$525,000	32	1993
Thailand Open	Bangkok, Thailand	Hard (indoor)	$550,000	32	2003
Kingfisher Airlines Tennis Open	Mumbai, India	Hard	$416,000	32	2006
Open de Moselle	Metz, France	Hard (indoor)	$416,000	32	2003
Kremlin Cup	Moscow, Russia	Carpet (indoor)	$1,000,000	32	1990
Stockholm Open	Stockholm, Sweden	Carpet (indoor)	$800,000	32	1969
Davidoff Swiss Indoors	Basel, Switzerland	Hard (indoor)	$1,000,000	32	1970
Grand Prix de Tennis de Lyon	Lyon, France	Carpet (indoor)	$800,000	32	1987
St. Petersburg Open	St. Petersburg, Russia	Carpet (indoor)	$1,000,000	32	1995

== Singles champions ==
=== ATP World Series ===
	1990	1991	1992	1993	1994	1995	1996	1997	1998	1999
Adelaide	Muster (1/26)	Kulti (1/3)	Ivanišević (2/11)	Kulti (2/3)	Kafelnikov (1/19)	Courier (2/8)	Kafelnikov (7/19)	Woodbridge (2/2)	Hewitt (1/22)	Enqvist (11/14)
Wellington/Doha	E. Sánchez (1/4)	Fromberg (3/4)	Tarango (1/2)	Becker (3/6)	Edberg (5/6)	Edberg (6/6)	Korda (4/5)	Courier (5/8)	Korda (5/5)	Schüttler (1/3)
Honolulu	Not an event				(South Africa) Ferreira (3/12)	Not an event				
Sydney	Noah (1/1)	Forget (2/6)	E. Sánchez (4/4)	Sampras (6/20)	Sampras (10/20)	P. McEnroe (1/1)	T. Martin (3/5)	Henman (1/9)	Kučera (3/5)	T. Martin (5/5)
Auckland	Davis (1/1)	Nováček (2/10)	Yzaga (2/4)	(Russia) Volkov (2/3)	Gustafsson (5/12)	Enqvist (3/14)	Novák (1/6)	Björkman (1/5)	Ríos (5/10)	Schalken (4/8)
Jakarta	Not an event			Chang (3/19)	Chang (7/19)	Haarhuis (1/1)	Schalken (2/8)	Not an event		
Milan	Lendl (1/4)	Volkov (1/3)	Camporese (2/2)	ATP Championship Series						
Zagreb/Split	Not an event						Ivanišević (6/11)	Ivanišević (10/11)	Ivanišević (11/11)	Not an event
Shanghai	Not an event						(Russia) Olhovskiy (2/2)	Krošlák (2/2)	Chang (18/19)	Norman (6/10)
San Francisco/ San Jose	Agassi (1/19)	Cahill (1/1)	Chang (2/19)	Agassi (4/19)	Furlan (1/2)	Agassi (8/19)	Sampras (14/20)	Sampras (17/20)	Agassi (9/19)	Philippoussis (5/8)
Dubai	Not an event			Nováček (8/10)	Gustafsson (6/12)	(South Africa) Ferreira (7/12)	Ivanišević (7/11)	Muster (26/26)	Corretja (3/9)	Golmard (1/2)
Marseille	Not an event			Rosset (3/11)	Rosset (6/11)	Becker (5/6)	Forget (6/6)	Enqvist (8/14)	Enqvist (9/14)	Santoro (2/5)
Guarujá	Jaite (1/3)	Baur (1/2)	Arriens (1/1)	Not an event						
Maceió	Not an event		Carbonell (1/2)	Not an event						
Rotterdam	Gilbert (1/3)	Camporese (1/2)	Becker (1/6)	Järryd (2/2)	Stich (7/10)	Krajicek (6/9)	Ivanišević (8/11)	Krajicek (7/9)	Siemerink (3/4)	ATP Championship Series
Memphis	Stich (1/10)	ATP Championship Series								
Chicago/ Scottsdale	Not an event	J. McEnroe (2/2)	Pescosolido (1/2)	Agassi (5/19)	Agassi (6/19)	Courier (3/8)	(South Africa) Ferreira (11/12)	Philippoussis (2/8)	Agassi (10/19)	Gambill (1/3)
Mexico City	Not an event			Muster (7/26)	Muster (14/26)	Muster (17/26)	Muster (23/26)	Clavet (4/8)	Novák (2/6)	Not an event
Casablanca	Muster (2/26)	Not an event	Pérez Roldán (3/4)	Pérez Roldán (4/4)	Furlan (2/2)	(Austria) Schaller (1/1)	Carbonell (2/2)	(Morocco) Arazi (1/1)	Gaudenzi (1/3)	A. Martín (1/3)
Copenhagen	Not an event	Svensson (2/2)	Larsson (2/5)	(Russia) Olhovskiy (1/2)	Kafelnikov (2/19)	(Germany) Sinner (1/2)	Pioline (1/3)	T. Johansson (1/7)	Gustafsson (9/12)	Gustafsson (11/12)
Zaragoza/ St. Petersburg	Not an event			Nováček (9/10)	Larsson (4/5)	Kafelnikov (4/19)	Gustafsson (7/12)	T. Johansson (2/7)	Krajicek (9/9)	Rosset (10/11)
Osaka	Not an event			Chang (4/19)	Sampras (11/20)	Not an event				
Estoril	E. Sánchez (2/4)	Bruguera (1/10)	C. Costa (1/5)	(Ukraine) A. Medvedev (3/4)	C. Costa (4/5)	Muster (18/26)	Muster (24/26)	Corretja (2/9)	Berasategui (13/13)	A. Costa (7/8)
Johannesburg/ Durban (Note: Held in Johannesburg in 1992 and in 1995; in Durban in 1993 and in Sun City in 1994.)	Not an event		Krickstein (1/2)	Krickstein (2/2)	Zoecke (1/1)	(Germany) Sinner (2/2)	Not an event			
New Delhi/ Chennai	Not an event						Enqvist (6/14)	Tillström (1/1)	Rafter (2/6)	Black (2/2)
Paget	Not an event					Hadad (1/1)	Washington (3/3)	Not an event		
Orlando/Atlanta	Gilbert (2/3)	Agassi (2/19)	Agassi (3/19)	(Netherlands) Eltingh (2/4)	Chang (9/19)	Chang (12/19)	Alami (1/2)	Filippini (2/3)	Sampras (18/20)	Koubek (1/3)
Rio de Janeiro	Mattar (1/3)	Not an event								
Nice	Aguilera (1/1)	Jaite (3/3)	Markus (1/1)	Goellner (1/2)	Berasategui (2/13)	Rosset (8/11)	Not an event			
Seoul	Antonitsch (1/1)	Baur (2/2)	Matsuoka (1/1)	Adams (1/1)	Bates (1/1)	Rusedski (2/10)	Black (1/2)	Not an event		
Hong Kong	Cash (1/1)	Krajicek (1/9)	Courier (1/8)	Sampras (7/20)	Chang (8/19)	Chang (11/19)	Sampras (15/20)	Chang (15/19)	(Denmark) Carlsen (1/1)	Agassi (13/19)
Madrid	Gómez (1/2)	Arrese (3/6)	Bruguera (3/10)	Edberg (4/6)	Muster (15/26)	Not an event				
Munich	Nováček (1/10)	Gustafsson (1/12)	Larsson (3/5)	Lendl (4/4)	Stich (8/10)	(South Africa) Ferreira (8/12)	Doseděl (2/3)	Philippoussis (3/8)	Enqvist (10/14)	Squillari (1/2)
Singapore/ Kuala Lumpur	Jones (1/1)	Siemerink (1/4)	Youl (1/1)	Reneberg (2/3)	(Netherlands) Eltingh (4/4)	Ríos (3/10)	Stark (2/2)	ATP Championship Series		
Tampa/Pinehurst	Not an event	Reneberg (1/3)	Yzaga (3/4)	Yzaga (4/4)	Palmer (1/1)	Not an event				
Coral Springs/ Delray Beach	Not an event			T. Martin (1/5)	Mattar (3/3)	Woodbridge (1/2)	Stoltenberg (3/4)	Stoltenberg (4/4)	Ilie (1/2)	Hewitt (2/22)
Charlotte/ Orlando (Note: Held in Kiawah Island in 1990; in Charlotte, North Carolina from 1991 to 1993; in Birmingham, Alabama in 1994; in Pinehurst, North Carolina from 1995 to 1996 and in Orlando from 1997 to 2000.)	Wheaton (1/2)	Yzaga (1/4)	Washington (1/3)	de la Peña (2/2)	Stoltenberg (2/4)	Enqvist (4/14)	Meligeni (2/3)	Chang (16/19)	Courier (8/8)	Norman (3/10)
Umag	Prpić (1/1)	Poliakov (1/1)	Muster (6/26)	Muster (12/26)	Berasategui (3/13)	Muster (21/26)	Moyá (2/13)	(Spain) Mantilla (4/8)	Ulihrach (3/3)	Norman (4/10)
Bologna/Merano	Fromberg (1/4)	Canè (1/1)	Oncins (1/2)	Burillo (1/1)	J. Sánchez (1/2)	Ríos (1/10)	Berasategui (9/13)	(Spain) Mantilla (2/8)	Alonso (2/2)	Vicente (1/3)
London	Lendl (2/4)	Edberg (3/6)	(South Africa) Ferreira (1/12)	Stich (5/10)	T. Martin (2/5)	Sampras (13/20)	Becker (6/6)	Philippoussis (4/8)	Draper (1/1)	Sampras (19/20)
Florence/Porto	Larsson (1/5)	Muster (3/26)	Muster (5/26)	Muster (8/26)	Filippini (1/3)	Berasategui (8/13)	(Spain) Mantilla (1/8)	Not an event		
's-Hertogenbosch	Mansdorf (1/1)	Saceanu (1/1)	Stich (4/10)	Boetsch (1/3)	Krajicek (5/9)	Kučera (1/5)	Reneberg (3/3)	Krajicek (8/9)	Rafter (3/6)	Rafter (5/6)
Genoa/St. Pölten	Agénor (1/2)	Steeb (1/2)	(Commonwealth of Independent States) A. Medvedev (1/4)	Muster (9/26)	Muster (16/26)	Muster (19/26)	Ríos (4/10)	Filippini (3/3)	Ríos (6/10)	Ríos (7/10)
Manchester/ Nottingham	Sampras (1/20)	Ivanišević (1/11)	(Netherlands) Eltingh (1/4)	Stoltenberg (1/4)	Rafter (1/6)	Frana (3/3)	Siemerink (2/4)	Rusedski (4/10)	Björkman (3/5)	Pioline (3/3)
Halle	Not an event			Leconte (1/1)	Stich (9/10)	Rosset (9/11)	Kulti (3/3)	Kafelnikov (10/19)	Kafelnikov (12/19)	Kiefer (2/5)
Båstad	Fromberg (2/4)	Gustafsson (2/12)	Gustafsson (4/12)	Skoff (2/2)	Karbacher (2/2)	Meligeni (1/3)	Gustafsson (8/12)	Norman (1/10)	Gustafsson (10/12)	Marín (1/1)
Gstaad	Jaite (2/3)	E. Sánchez (3/4)	Bruguera (4/10)	Bruguera (6/10)	Bruguera (9/10)	Kafelnikov (5/19)	A. Costa (2/8)	(Spain) Mantilla (3/8)	Corretja (4/9)	A. Costa (8/8)
Newport	Aldrich (1/1)	Shelton (1/2)	Shelton (2/2)	Rusedski (1/10)	Wheaton (2/2)	Prinosil (1/3)	Pereira (2/2)	Sargsian (1/1)	Paes (1/1)	Woodruff (1/1)
Hilversum/ Amsterdam	Clavet (1/8)	Gustafsson (3/12)	Nováček (5/10)	C. Costa (2/5)	Nováček (10/10)	Ríos (2/10)	Clavet (3/8)	Doseděl (3/3)	Norman (2/10)	El Aynaoui (1/5)
Kitzbühel	de la Peña (1/2)	Nováček (3/10)	Sampras (4/20)	Muster (10/26)	Ivanišević (5/11)	A. Costa (1/8)	Berasategui (10/13)	Dewulf (2/2)	A. Costa (6/8)	ATP Championship Series
Los Angeles	Edberg (1/6)	Sampras (2/20)	Krajicek (2/9)	Krajicek (4/9)	Becker (4/6)	Stich (10/10)	Chang (14/19)	Courier (6/8)	Agassi (11/19)	Sampras (20/20)
Sanremo	Arrese (1/6)	Not an event								
Prague	Arrese (2/6)	Nováček (4/10)	Nováček (7/10)	Bruguera (7/10)	Bruguera (10/10)	Ulihrach (1/3)	Kafelnikov (8/19)	Pioline (2/3)	Meligeni (3/3)	Hrbatý (2/6)
Long Island	Edberg (2/6)	Lendl (3/4)	Korda (2/5)	Rosset (4/11)	Kafelnikov (3/19)	Kafelnikov (6/19)	(Ukraine) A. Medvedev (4/4)	Moyá (3/13)	Rafter (4/6)	Norman (5/10)
San Marino	Pérez Roldán (1/4)	Pérez Roldán (2/4)	Nováček (6/10)	Muster (11/26)	C. Costa (5/5)	Muster (20/26)	A. Costa (3/8)	(Spain) Mantilla (5/8)	Hrbatý (1/6)	Blanco (1/1)
Schenectady	Krishnan (1/1)	Stich (2/10)	(South Africa) Ferreira (2/12)	Enqvist (2/14)	(Netherlands) Eltingh (3/4)	Not an event				
Boston	Not an event							Schalken (3/8)	Chang (17/19)	Safin (1/7)
Bordeaux/ Bournemouth	Forget (1/6)	Forget (3/6)	(Commonwealth of Independent States) A. Medvedev (2/4)	Bruguera (8/10)	(South Africa) Ferreira (4/12)	Doumbia (1/2)	A. Costa (4/8)	(Spain) Mantilla (6/8)	(Spain) Mantilla (7/8)	Voinea (1/1)
Geneva/Cologne	Skoff (1/2)	Muster (4/26)	Karbacher (1/2)	Not an event						
Tashkent	Not an event							Henman (2/9)	Henman (3/9)	Kiefer (3/5)
Bucharest	Not an event			Ivanišević (3/11)	Davín (2/2)	Muster (22/26)	Berasategui (11/13)	Fromberg (4/4)	Clavet (6/8)	A. Martín (2/3)
Brasília	Not an event	Gómez (2/2)	Not an event							
Bogotá	Not an event				Pereira (1/2)	Lapentti (1/3)	Muster (25/26)	Clavet (5/8)	Zabaleta (1/3)	Not an event
Basel	J. McEnroe (1/2)	Hlasek (2/2)	Becker (2/6)	Stich (6/10)	(South Africa) Ferreira (5/12)	Courier (4/8)	Sampras (16/20)	Rusedski (5/10)	Henman (4/9)	Kučera (4/5)
Palermo	Davín (1/2)	Fontang (1/1)	Bruguera (5/10)	Muster (13/26)	Berasategui (4/13)	Clavet (2/8)	Alami (2/2)	Berasategui (12/13)	Puerta (1/3)	Di Pasquale (1/1)
Brisbane	Gilbert (3/3)	Pozzi (1/1)	Raoux (1/1)	Not an event						
Kuala Lumpur II	Not an event			Chang (5/19)	Not an event					
Toulouse	Svensson (1/2)	Forget (4/6)	Forget (5/6)	Boetsch (2/3)	Larsson (5/5)	Boetsch (3/3)	Philippoussis (1/8)	Kiefer (1/5)	Siemerink (4/4)	Escudé (1/2)
Athens	Koevermans (1/1)	Bruguera (2/10)	Arrese (5/6)	Arrese (6/6)	Berasategui (5/13)	Not an event				
Berlin/Bolzano/ Ostrava	Agénor (2/2)	Korda (1/5)	Enqvist (1/14)	Stark (1/2)	Washington (2/3)	(South Africa) Ferreira (9/12)	Prinosil (2/3)	Kučera (2/5)	Agassi (12/19)	Not an event
Valencia/Marbella/ Mallorca	Not an event					Schalken (1/8)	Goellner (2/2)	A. Costa (5/8)	Kuerten (1/7)	Ferrero (1/9)
Tel Aviv	Chesnokov (1/1)	Lavalle (1/1)	Tarango (2/2)	Pescosolido (2/2)	(South Africa) Ferreira (6/12)	Krošlák (1/2)	J. Sánchez (2/2)	Not an event	ATP Challenger Series	
Lyon	Rosset (1/11)	Sampras (3/20)	Sampras (5/20)	Sampras (8/20)	Rosset (7/11)	(South Africa) Ferreira (10/12)	Kafelnikov (9/19)	Santoro (1/5)	Corretja (5/9)	Lapentti (2/3)
Vienna	Järryd (1/2)	Stich (3/10)	Korda (3/5)	Ivanišević (4/11)	Agassi (7/19)	Dewulf (1/2)	ATP Championship Series			
Guarujá II	Not an event	Frana (1/3)	Not an event							
Buzios/Santiago	Not an event	Arrese (4/6)	Oncins (2/2)	Frana (2/3)	Berasategui (6/13)	Doseděl (1/3)	Gumy (1/1)	Alonso (1/2)	Clavet (7/8)	Not an event
Taipei/Beijing	Not an event		Grabb (1/1)	Chang (6/19)	Chang (10/19)	Chang (13/19)	Rusedski (3/10)	Courier (7/8)	Not an event	
São Paulo/ Montevideo	Weiss (1/1)	Miniussi (1/1)	Mattar (2/3)	Berasategui (1/13)	Berasategui (7/13)	Ulihrach (2/3)	Not an event		ATP Challenger Series	
Moscow	Cherkasov (1/2)	Cherkasov (2/2)	Rosset (2/11)	Rosset (5/11)	(Russia) Volkov (3/3)	Steeb (2/2)	Ivanišević (9/11)	Kafelnikov (11/19)	Kafelnikov (13/19)	Kafelnikov (14/19)
Wembley	Hlasek (1/2)	Not an event								
Birmingham	Not an event	Chang (1/19)	Not an event							
Itaparica	Wilander (1/1)	Not an event								
Antwerp	Not an event		Krajicek (3/9)	Sampras (9/20)	Sampras (12/20)	Not an event	ATP Championship Series			Not an event
Buenos Aires	Not an event			C. Costa (3/5)	Corretja (1/9)	Moyá (1/13)	Not an event	ATP Challenger Series		
Stockholm	ATP Championship Series, Single Week					Enqvist (5/14)	Enqvist (7/14)	Björkman (2/5)	T. Martin (4/5)	Enqvist (12/14)

=== ATP International Series ===
	2000	2001	2002	2003	2004	2005	2006	2007	2008
Adelaide	Hewitt (3/22)	Haas (1/10)	Henman (8/9)	Davydenko (1/16)	Hrbatý (4/6)	J. Johansson (1/2)	Serra (2/2)	Djokovic (3/14)	Llodra (2/4)
Chennai	Golmard (2/2)	Tabara (1/1)	Cañas (2/5)	Srichaphan (3/5)	Moyá (10/13)	Moyá (11/13)	Ljubičić (3/7)	Malisse (2/3)	Youzhny (3/8)
Doha	Santoro (3/5)	Ríos (9/10)	El Aynaoui (3/5)	Koubek (3/3)	Escudé (2/2)	Federer (9/25)	Federer (12/25)	Ljubičić (5/7)	Murray (4/17)
Auckland	Norman (7/10)	Hrbatý (3/6)	Rusedski (7/10)	Kuerten (5/7)	Hrbatý (5/6)	González (5/11)	Nieminen (1/2)	Ferrer (2/16)	Kohlschreiber (2/8)
Sydney	Hewitt (4/22)	Hewitt (7/22)	Federer (2/25)	Lee (1/1)	Hewitt (13/22)	Hewitt (16/22)	Blake (3/9)	Blake (8/9)	Tursunov (4/7)
Milan	ATP International; Series Gold	Federer (1/25)	Sanguinetti (1/2)	Verkerk (1/2)	Dupuis (1/1)	Söderling (2/7)	Not an event		
Dubai	Kiefer (4/5)	ATP International Series Gold							
Santiago/ Viña del Mar	Kuerten (2/7)	Coria (1/5)	González (2/11)	D. Sánchez (1/2)	González (4/11)	Gaudio (2/5)	Acasuso (3/3)	Horna (1/1)	González (9/11)
Marseille	Rosset (12/12)	Kafelnikov (16/19)	Enqvist (14/14)	Federer (3/25)	Hrbatý (6/6)	J. Johansson (2/2)	Clément (3/4)	Simon (1/13)	Murray (5/17)
Costa do Sauípe	Not an event	Vacek (1/1)	Kuerten (4/7)	Schalken (8/8)	Kuerten (7/7)	Nadal (2/10)	Massú (4/4)	Cañas (5/5)	Almagro (4/11)
Zagreb	Not an event						Ljubičić (4/7)	Baghdatis (2/4)	Stakhovsky (1/4)
Bogotá	Puerta (2/3)	Vicente (3/3)	Not an event		ATP Challenger Tour				
San Jose	Philippoussis (6/8)	Rusedski (6/10)	Hewitt (10/22)	Agassi (17/19)	Roddick (7/21)	Roddick (10/21)	Murray (1/17)	Murray (2/17)	Roddick (17/21)
Copenhagen	Vinciguerra (1/1)	Henman (6/9)	Burgsmüller (1/1)	Kučera (5/5)	Not an event				
Buenos Aires	Not an event	Kuerten (3/7)	Massú (1/4)	Moyá (8/13)	Coria (4/5)	Gaudio (3/5)	Moyá (12/13)	Mónaco (1/7)	Nalbandian (5/7)
Delray Beach	Koubek (2/3)	Gambill (2/3)	Sanguinetti (2/2)	Gambill (3/3)	Mello (1/1)	Malisse (1/3)	Haas (5/10)	Malisse (3/3)	Nishikori (1/6)
Scottsdale/ Las Vegas	Hewitt (5/22)	Clavet (8/8)	Agassi (15/19)	Hewitt (12/22)	Spadea (1/1)	Arthurs (1/1)	Blake (4/9)	Hewitt (18/22)	Querrey (1/8)
Atlanta	Ilie (2/2)	Roddick (1/21)	Not an event						
Estoril	Moyá (4/13)	Ferrero (2/9)	Nalbandian (1/7)	Davydenko (2/16)	Chela (2/4)	Gaudio (4/5)	Nalbandian (4/7)	Djokovic (4/14)	Federer (16/25)
Casablanca	Vicente (2/3)	Cañas (1/5)	El Aynaoui (4/5)	Boutter (1/1)	Ventura (1/1)	Puerta (3/3)	Bracciali (1/1)	Mathieu (3/4)	Simon (3/13)
Orlando/Houston	González (1/11)	Roddick (2/21)	Roddick (3/21)	Agassi (18/19)	Haas (3/10)	Roddick (11/21)	Fish (2/6)	Karlović (1/8)	Granollers (1/3)
Majorca/Valencia	Safin (2/7)	Martín (3/3)	Gaudio (1/5)	Ferrero (4/9)	Verdasco (1/6)	Andreev (1/3)	Almagro (1/11)	Almagro (2/11)	Ferrer (4/16)
Munich	Squillari (2/2)	Novák (3/6)	El Aynaoui (5/5)	Federer (4/25)	Davydenko (3/16)	Nalbandian (3/7)	Rochus (2/2)	Kohlschreiber (1/8)	González (10/11)
St. Pölten/ Pörtschach	Pavel (1/1)	Gaudenzi (2/3)	Lapentti (3/3)	Roddick (4/21)	Volandri (1/2)	Davydenko (5/16)	Davydenko (6/16)	Mónaco (2/7)	Davydenko (11/16)
Halle	Prinosil (3/3)	T. Johansson (4/7)	Kafelnikov (18/19)	Federer (5/25)	Federer (6/25)	Federer (10/25)	Federer (13/25)	Berdych (2/9)	Federer (17/25)
London	Hewitt (6/22)	Hewitt (8/22)	Hewitt (11/22)	Roddick (5/21)	Roddick (8/21)	Roddick (12/21)	Hewitt (17/22)	Roddick (15/21)	Nadal (5/10)
's-Hertogenbosch	Rafter (6/6)	Hewitt (9/22)	Schalken (6/8)	Schalken (7/8)	Llodra (1/4)	Ančić (1/3)	Ančić (2/3)	Ljubičić (6/7)	Ferrer (5/16)
Nottingham	Grosjean (1/3)	T. Johansson (5/7)	Björkman (4/5)	Rusedski (8/10)	Srichaphan (5/5)	Gasquet (1/16)	Gasquet (2/16)	Karlović (2/8)	Karlović (4/8)
Båstad	Norman (8/10)	Gaudenzi (3/3)	Moyá (6/13)	Zabaleta (2/3)	Zabaleta (3/3)	Nadal (3/10)	Robredo (2/10)	Ferrer (3/16)	Robredo (5/10)
Gstaad	Corretja (6/9)	Novák (4/6)	Corretja (9/9)	Novák (5/6)	Federer (7/25)	Gaudio (5/5)	Gasquet (3/16)	Mathieu (4/4)	Hănescu (1/1)
Newport	Wessels (1/1)	Godwin (1/1)	Dent (1/3)	Ginepri (1/3)	Rusedski (9/10)	Rusedski (9/10)	Philippoussis (8/8)	Santoro (4/5)	Santoro (5/5)
Amsterdam/ Amersfoort	Gustafsson (12/12)	Corretja (8/9)	Chela (1/4)	Massú (2/4)	Verkerk (2/2)	González (6/11)	Djokovic (1/14)	Darcis (1/1)	Montañés (1/6)
Indianapolis	ATP International Series Gold			Roddick (6/21)	Roddick (9/21)	Ginepri (2/3)	Blake (5/9)	Tursunov (2/7)	Simon (4/13)
Umag	Ríos (8/10)	Moyá (5/13)	Moyá (7/13)	Moyá (9/13)	Cañas (3/5)	Coria (5/5)	Wawrinka (1/9)	Moyá (13/13)	Verdasco (2/6)
Stuttgart	ATP International Series Gold		Youzhny (1/8)	ATP International Series Gold					
Los Angeles	Chang (21/21)	Agassi (14/19)	Agassi (16/19)	Ferreira (12/12)	Haas (4/10)	Agassi (19/19)	Haas (6/10)	Štěpánek (1/3)	del Potro (1/11)
San Marino	Calatrava (1/1)	ATP Challenger Tour							
Sopot/Warsaw	Not an event	Robredo (1/10)	Acasuso (1/3)	Coria (2/5)	Nadal (1/10)	Monfils (1/10)	Davydenko (7/16)	Robredo (3/10)	Davydenko (12/16)
Washington, D.C.	ATP International Series Gold			Henman (9/9)	Hewitt (14/22)	Roddick (13/21)	Clément (4/4)	Roddick (16/21)	del Potro (2/11)
Long Island/ New Haven	Norman (9/10)	Haas (2/10)	Srichaphan (1/5)	Srichaphan (4/5)	Hewitt (15/22)	Blake (1/9)	Davydenko (8/16)	Blake (9/9)	Čilić (1/17)
Tashkent	Safin (3/7)	Safin (5/7)	Kafelnikov (19/19)	Not an event					
Bucharest	Balcells (1/1)	El Aynaoui (2/5)	Ferrer (1/16)	D. Sánchez (2/2)	Acasuso (2/3)	Serra (1/2)	Melzer (1/4)	Simon (2/13)	Simon (5/13)
Beijing	Not an event				Safin (7/7)	Nadal (4/10)	Baghdatis (1/4)	González (8/11)	Roddick (18/21)
Palermo	Rochus (1/2)	Mantilla (8/8)	González (3/11)	Massú (3/4)	Berdych (1/9)	Andreev (2/3)	Volandri (2/2)	Not an event	
Hong Kong	Kiefer (5/5)	Ríos (10/10)	Ferrero (3/9)	Not an event					
Toulouse	Corretja (7/9)	Not an event							
Shanghai/ Ho Chi Minh City/ Mumbai	Norman (10/10)	Schüttler (2/3)	Not an event	Philippoussis (7/8)	Cañas (4/5)	Björkman (5/5)	Tursunov (1/7)	Gasquet (5/16)	Not an event
Bangkok	Not an event			Dent (2/3)	Federer (8/25)	Federer (11/25)	Blake (6/9)	Tursunov (3/7)	Tsonga (1/14)
Metz	Not an event			Clément (2/4)	Haehnel (1/1)	Ljubičić (2/7)	Djokovic (2/14)	Robredo (4/10)	Tursunov (5/7)
Moscow	Kafelnikov (15/19)	Kafelnikov (17/19)	Mathieu (1/4)	Dent (3/3)	Davydenko (4/16)	Andreev (3/3)	Davydenko (9/16)	Davydenko (10/16)	Kunitsyn (1/1)
Lyon	Clément (1/4)	Ljubičić (1/7)	Mathieu (2/4)	Schüttler (3/3)	Söderling (1/7)	Roddick (14/21)	Gasquet (4/16)	Grosjean (3/3)	Söderling (3/7)
Stockholm	T. Johansson (3/7)	Schalken (5/8)	Srichaphan (2/5)	Fish (1/6)	T. Johansson (6/7)	Blake (2/9)	Blake (7/9)	Karlović (3/8)	Nalbandian (6/7)
Basel	Enqvist (13/14)	Henman (7/9)	Nalbandian (2/7)	Coria (3/5)	Novák (6/6)	González (7/11)	Federer (14/25)	Federer (15/25)	Federer (18/25)
St. Petersburg	Safin (4/7)	Safin (6/7)	Grosjean (2/3)	Kuerten (6/7)	Youzhny (2/8)	T. Johansson (7/7)	Ančić (3/3)	Murray (3/17)	Murray (6/17)
Brighton	Henman (5/9)	Not an event							

== Doubles champions ==
=== ATP World Series ===
	1990	1991	1992	1993	1994	1995	1996	1997	1998	1999
Adelaide	Castle (1/1); Odizor (1/2)	W. Ferreira (1/4); Kruger (2/2)	Ivanišević (3/6); Rosset (2/6)	Woodbridge (8/34); Woodforde (5/24)	A. Kratzmann (1/8); M. Kratzmann (6/6)	Courier (1/2); Rafter (2/7)	Woodbridge (16/34); Woodforde (14/24)	Rafter (4/7); Shelton (2/2)	Eagle (1/3); Florent (2/3)	Kuerten (5/6); Lapentti (3/3)
Wellington/Doha	Evernden (1/1); Pereira (1/3)	Mattar (1/3); Pereira (2/3)	Palmer (1/19); Stark (1/11)	Becker (1/1); Kühnen (1/1)	Delaître (3/11); Simian (1/2)	Edberg (1/1); Larsson (3/5)	Knowles (2/19); Nestor (2/30)	Eltingh (16/23); Haarhuis (16/29)	Bhupathi (4/24); Paes (4/28)	Palmer (9/19); O'Brien (3/4)
Honolulu	Not an event				Nijssen (4/4); Suk (6/21)	Not an event				
Sydney	Cash (1/3); M. Kratzmann (1/6)	Davis (4/6); Pate (4/5)	Casal (8/18); E. Sánchez (7/17)	Stolle (2/13); Stoltenberg (5/5)	Cahill (3/3); Stolle (3/13)	Woodbridge (13/34); Woodforde (11/24)	E. Ferreira (2/10); Siemerink (6/8)	Lobo (5/9); J. Sánchez (9/13)	Woodbridge (20/34); Woodforde (18/24)	Lareau (4/6); Nestor (3/30)
Auckland	Jones (1/4); Van't Hof (1/2)	Casal (6/18); E. Sánchez (5/17)	W. Ferreira (2/4); Grabb (2/10)	Connell (3/9); Galbraith (9/21)	P. McEnroe (6/9); Palmer (2/19)	Connell (5/9); Galbraith (11/21)	Ondruska (1/4); Waite (2/3)	E. Ferreira (3/10); Galbraith (16/21)	Galbraith (19/21); Steven (8/8)	Tarango (6/12); Vacek (13/15)
Jakarta	Not an event			Nargiso (2/4); Raoux (1/4)	Björkman (1/26); Borwick (1/1)	Adams (6/14); Olhovskiy (5/18)	Leach (5/14); Melville (3/4)	Not an event		
Milan	Camporese (1/4); Nargiso (1/4)	Camporese (3/4) (Socialist Federal Republic of Yugoslavia) Ivanišević (1/6)	Broad (2/5); Macpherson (1/12)	ATP Championship Series						
Zagreb/Split	Not an event						Oosting (6/7); Pimek (8/11)	Hiršzon (2/2); Ivanišević (5/6)	Damm (11/26); Novák (6/12)	Not an event
Shanghai	Not an event						Knowles (3/19); Smith (2/2)	Mirnyi (1/20); Ullyett (1/23)	Bhupathi (7/24); Paes (7/28)	Lareau (6/6); Nestor (4/30)
San Francisco/ San Jose	Jones (2/4); Van't Hof (2/2)	Masur (2/2); Stoltenberg (4/5)	Grabb (3/10); Reneberg (1/9)	Davis (6/6); Eltingh (7/23)	Leach (3/14); Palmer (3/19)	Grabb (7/10); P. McEnroe (8/9)	Kronemann (5/5); Macpherson (9/12)	MacPhie (1/5); Muller (6/6)	Woodbridge (21/34); Woodforde (19/24)	Woodbridge (23/34); Woodforde (21/24)
Dubai	Not an event			Fitzgerald (4/6); Järryd (7/12)	Woodbridge (11/34); Woodforde (7/24)	Connell (6/9); Galbraith (12/21)	B. Black (7/13); Connell (8/9)	Groen (1/1); Ivanišević (6/6)	Bhupathi (5/24); Paes (5/28)	W. Black (1/10); Stolle (8/13)
Marseille	Not an event			Boetsch (2/2); Delaître (2/11)	Siemerink (2/8); Vacek (4/15)	Adams (7/14); Olhovskiy (6/18)	Fleurian (1/1); Raoux (3/4)	Enqvist (1/1); Larsson (4/5)	Johnson (3/16); Montana (6/8)	Mirnyi (2/20); Olhovskiy (14/18)
Guarujá	Frana (1/6); Luza (1/4)	Delaître (1/11); R. Gilbert (1/2)	Allgårdh (1/1); Limberger (1/1)	Not an event						
Maceió	Not an event		Markus (1/1); Sobel (1/1)	Not an event						
Rotterdam	Lavalle (1/3); Lozano (1/3)	Galbraith (2/21); Järryd (1/12)	Goellner (1/4); Prinosil (1/8)	Holm (1/4); Järryd (8/12)	Bates (2/2); Björkman (2/26)	Damm (6/26); Järryd (11/12)	Adams (8/14); Barnard (3/6)	Eltingh (17/23); Haarhuis (17/29)	Eltingh (21/23); Haarhuis (21/29)	ATP Championship Series
Memphis	Cahill (1/3); M. Kratzmann (2/6)	ATP Championship Series								
Chicago/ Scottsdale	Not an event	Davis (5/6); Pate (5/5)	Keil (1/5); Randall (1/3)	Keil (2/5); Randall (2/3)	Apell (2/8); K. Flach (3/3)	Kronemann (3/5); Macpherson (7/12)	Galbraith (13/21); Leach (6/14)	Lobo (6/9); J. Sánchez (10/13)	Suk (12/21); Tebbutt (1/1)	Gimelstob (3/10); Reneberg (8/9)
Mexico City	Not an event			Lavalle (2/3); Oncins (2/4)	Montana (2/8); Shelton (1/2)	Frana (5/6); Lavalle (3/3)	Johnson (1/16); Montana (4/8)	Lapentti (2/3); Orsanic (3/7)	Novák (8/12); Rikl (12/22)	Not an event
Casablanca	Woodbridge (1/34); Youl (1/2)	Not an event	de la Peña (2/4); Lozano (2/3)	Bauer (2/4); Norval (1/10)	Adams (4/14); Oosting (3/7)	(Spain) Carbonell (9/18); Roig (5/8)	Novák (3/12); Rikl (8/22)	Cunha e Silva (2/2) (Portugal) Marques (1/1)	Gaudenzi (1/1); Nargiso (3/4)	Meligeni (6/6); Oncins (3/4)
Copenhagen	Not an event	Woodbridge (3/34); Woodforde (1/24)	Kulti (1/9); Larsson (2/5)	Adams (2/14) (Russia) Olhovskiy (1/18)	Damm (3/26); Steven (2/8)	(United States) Keil (4/5); Nyborg (2/3)	Pimek (9/11); Talbot (3/5)	Olhovskiy (12/18); Steven (5/8)	Kempers (3/4); Oosting (7/7)	Mirnyi (3/20); Olhovskiy (15/18)
Zaragoza/ St. Petersburg	Not an event			Damm (1/26); Nováček (3/6)	Holm (4/4); Järryd (10/12)	Damm (7/26); Järryd (12/12)	Kafelnikov (5/10); Olhovskiy (8/18)	Olhovskiy (13/18); Steven (6/8)	Kulti (6/9); Tillström (3/6)	Tarango (7/12); Vacek (14/15)
Osaka	Not an event			(United States) Keil (3/5) van Rensburg (3/8)	Damm (4/26); Stolle (4/13)	Not an event				
Estoril	Casal (1/18); E. Sánchez (1/17)	Haarhuis (2/29); Koevermans (1/3)	Davids (3/7); Pimek (2/11)	Adams (3/14) (Russia) Olhovskiy (2/18)	Brandi (1/2); Mordegan (1/1)	Kafelnikov (3/10); Olhovskiy (7/18)	(Spain) Carbonell (12/18); Roig (8/8)	Kuerten (2/6); Meligeni (2/6)	Johnson (4/16); Montana (7/8)	(Spain) Carbonell (13/18); Johnson (6/16)
Johannesburg/ Durban	Not an event		Aldrich (2/2); Visser (3/6)	Bale (1/4); B. Black (1/13)	Barnard (2/6); Haygarth (1/6)	R. Gilbert (2/2); Raoux (2/4)	Not an event			
New Delhi/ Chennai	Not an event						Björkman (10/26); Kulti (3/9)	Bhupathi (1/24); Paes (1/28)	Bhupathi (6/24); Paes (6/28)	Bhupathi (8/24); Paes (8/28)
Paget	Not an event					Connell (7/9); T. Martin (2/3)	Apell (8/8); Haygarth (3/6)	Not an event		
Orlando/Atlanta	Davis (1/6); Pate (1/5)	L. Jensen (1/5); Melville (1/4)	DeVries (1/3); Macpherson (2/12)	Annacone (1/2); Reneberg (3/9)	Palmer (4/19); Reneberg (5/9)	Casal (17/18); E. Sánchez (16/17)	van Rensburg (7/8); Wheaton (2/2)	Björkman (11/26); Kulti (4/9)	E. Ferreira (6/10); Haygarth (5/6)	Galbraith (20/21); Gimelstob (4/10)
Rio de Janeiro	Garrow (1/1); Salumaa (1/1)	Not an event								
Nice	Mancini (1/1); Noah (1/1)	Bergh (2/5); Gunnarsson (1/1)	Galbraith (5/21); Melville (2/4)	Macpherson (6/12); Warder (3/4)	J. Sánchez (5/13); Woodforde (8/24)	Suk (7/21); Vacek (6/15)	Not an event			
Seoul	Connell (1/9); Michibata (1/2)	Antonitsch (1/2); Bloom (1/2)	Curren (2/2); Muller (4/6)	Apell (1/8); Nyborg (1/3)	Simian (2/2); Thorne (1/2)	Lareau (1/6); Tarango (1/12)	Leach (7/14); Stark (8/11)	Not an event		
Hong Kong	Cash (2/3); Masur (1/2)	Galbraith (3/21); Witsken (1/2)	B. Gilbert (1/1); Grabb (4/10)	Wheaton (1/2); Woodbridge (9/34)	Grabb (6/10); Steven (3/8)	Ho (2/3); Philippoussis (1/3)	Galbraith (14/21); Olhovskiy (9/18)	Damm (9/26); Vacek (11/15)	B. Black (9/13); O'Brien (2/4)	Greenhalgh (1/1); Silcock (1/1)
Madrid	Báguena (1/1); Camporese (2/4)	Luza (3/4); Motta (1/1)	Galbraith (6/21); P. McEnroe (3/9)	(Spain) Carbonell (6/18); C. Costa (2/3)	Bergh (5/5); Oosting (4/7)	Not an event				
Munich	Riglewski (1/4); Stich (1/5)	Galbraith (4/21); Witsken (2/2)	Adams (1/14); Oosting (1/7)	Damm (2/26); Holm (2/4)	Kafelnikov (1/10); Rikl (4/22)	Kronemann (4/5); Macpherson (8/12)	Bale (4/4); Noteboom (2/2)	Albano (5/7) (Spain) Corretja (2/2)	Woodbridge (22/34); Woodforde (20/24)	Orsanic (6/7); Puerta (2/3)
Singapore/ Kuala Lumpur	M. Kratzmann (3/6); Stoltenberg (1/5)	Connell (2/9); Michibata (2/2)	Woodbridge (7/34); Woodforde (4/24)	Eltingh (6/23); Haarhuis (7/29)	Eltingh (11/23); Haarhuis (11/29)	P. McEnroe (9/9); Philippoussis (2/3)	Woodbridge (19/34); Woodforde (17/24)	ATP Championship Series		
Tampa/Pinehurst	Not an event	K. Flach (1/3); Seguso (1/1)	Briggs (1/1); Kronemann (1/5)	T. Martin (1/3); Rostagno (1/1)	Woodbridge (12/34); Woodforde (9/24)	Not an event				
Coral Springs/ Delray Beach	Not an event			P. McEnroe (4/9); Stark (2/11)	Bale (2/4); Steven (4/8)	Woodbridge (15/34); Woodforde (13/24)	Woodbridge (17/34); Woodforde (15/24)	Randall (3/3); Van Emburgh (5/5)	Stafford (3/4); Ullyett (3/23)	Mirnyi (4/20); Zimonjić (1/17)
Charlotte/ Orlando	Davis (2/6); Pate (2/5)	Leach (1/14); Pugh (1/3)	DeVries (2/3); Macpherson (3/12)	Bergh (4/5); Kronemann (2/5)	Reneberg (4/9) van Rensburg (5/8)	Woodbridge (14/34); Woodforde (12/24)	Cash (3/3); Rafter (3/7)	Merklein (1/4); Spadea (2/3)	Stafford (2/4); Ullyett (2/23)	Courier (2/2); Woodbridge (24/34)
Umag	Flégl (1/5); Vacek (1/15)	Bloom (2/2); J. Sánchez (3/13)	Prinosil (2/8); Vogel (1/1)	Dewulf (1/1); Vanhoudt (1/1)	(Uruguay) Pérez (2/2); Roig (4/8)	Lobo (3/9); J. Sánchez (8/13)	Albano (4/7); Lobo (4/9)	Pescariu (1/1); Sanguinetti (1/1)	Broad (4/5); Norval (5/10)	Puerta (3/3); J. Sánchez (13/13)
Bologna/Merano	Luza (2/4); Riglewski (2/4)	L. Jensen (2/5); Warder (1/4)	L. Jensen (3/5); Warder (2/4)	Visser (4/6); Warder (4/4)	Fitzgerald (5/6); Rafter (1/7)	B. Black (5/13); Stark (7/11)	Haygarth (4/6) van Rensburg (8/8)	Kuerten (3/6); Meligeni (3/6)	Coupe (1/1); Rosner (1/1)	Arnold (2/15); Oncins (4/4)
London	Bates (1/2); Curren (1/2)	Woodbridge (4/34); Woodforde (2/24)	Fitzgerald (1/6); Järryd (3/12)	Woodbridge (10/34); Woodforde (6/24)	Apell (3/8); Björkman (3/26)	T. Martin (3/3); Sampras (1/1)	Woodbridge (18/34); Woodforde (16/24)	Philippoussis (3/3); Rafter (5/7)	Abandoned (Note: The final was abandoned due to rain.)	Lareau (5/6); O'Brien (4/4)
Florence/Porto	Bruguera (1/2) de la Peña (1/4)	Jonsson (1/2); Larsson (1/5)	Filippini (1/2); Mattar (2/3)	(Spain) Carbonell (7/18); Pimek (4/11)	Ireland (1/1); Thorne (2/2)	(Spain) Carbonell (10/18); Roig (6/8)	Couto (1/1); Mota (1/1)	Not an event		
's-Hertogenbosch	Hlasek (1/6); Stich (2/5)	Davids (2/7); Haarhuis (3/29)	Grabb (5/10); Reneberg (2/9)	Stark (3/11); P. McEnroe (5/9)	Noteboom (1/2); Wibier (1/1)	Krajicek (2/2); Siemerink (4/8)	Kilderry (1/3); Vízner (2/12)	Eltingh (18/23); Haarhuis (18/29)	Raoux (4/4); Siemerink (7/8)	Abandoned (Note: The final was abandoned due to rain.)
Genoa/St. Pölten	(Spain) Carbonell (1/18); Riglewski (3/4)	(Spain) Górriz (1/1); Mora (2/2)	Cannon (2/2); Van Emburgh (1/5)	Casal (11/18); E. Sánchez (10/17)	Flégl (5/5); Florent (1/3)	Behrens (1/1); Lucena (1/1)	Doseděl (1/1); Vízner (1/12)	Jones (4/4); Melville (4/4)	Grabb (10/10); Macpherson (10/12)	Florent (3/3); Olhovskiy (16/18)
Manchester/ Nottingham	M. Kratzmann (4/6); Stoltenberg (2/5)	Camporese (4/4) (Socialist Federal Republic of Yugoslavia) Ivanišević (2/6)	Galbraith (7/21); Macpherson (4/12)	K. Flach (2/3); Leach (2/14)	Leach (4/14); Visser (6/6)	L. Jensen (4/5); M. Jensen (1/2)	Petchey (1/1); Sapsford (1/1)	E. Ferreira (4/10); Galbraith (17/21)	Gimelstob (2/10); Talbot (5/5)	Galbraith (21/21); Gimelstob (5/10)
Halle	Not an event			Korda (2/2); Suk (5/21)	Delaître (4/11); Forget (3/5)	Eltingh (13/23); Haarhuis (13/29)	B. Black (8/13); Connell (9/9)	Braasch (1/6); Stich (5/5)	E. Ferreira (7/10); Leach (9/14)	Björkman (12/26); Rafter (7/7)
Båstad	Båthman (1/3); Bergh (1/5)	Båthman (2/3); Bergh (3/5)	(Spain) Carbonell (4/18); Miniussi (1/1)	Holm (3/4); Järryd (9/12)	Apell (4/8); Björkman (4/26)	Apell (7/8); Björkman (7/26)	Ekerot (1/2); Tarango (3/12)	Kulti (5/9); Tillström (2/6)	Gustafsson (1/1); Larsson (5/5)	Adams (9/14); Tarango (8/12)
Gstaad	Casal (2/18); E. Sánchez (2/17)	Muller (2/6); Visser (2/6)	Davids (4/7); Pimek (3/11)	Pioline (1/1); Rosset (4/6)	Casal (15/18); E. Sánchez (14/17)	Lobo (2/9); J. Sánchez (7/13)	Novák (4/12); Vízner (3/12)	Kafelnikov (8/10); Vacek (12/15)	Kuerten (4/6); Meligeni (5/6)	Johnson (7/16); Suk (13/21)
Newport	Cahill (2/3); M. Kratzmann (5/6)	Pozzi (1/1); Steven (1/8)	Deppe (1/1); Rikl (2/22)	Frana (3/6) van Rensburg (4/8)	Antonitsch (2/2); Rusedski (1/2)	Renzenbrink (1/1); Zoecke (1/1)	Barnard (4/6); Norval (3/10)	Gimelstob (1/10); Steven (7/8)	D. Flach (2/2); Stolle (6/13)	Arthurs (4/7); Paes (10/28)
Hilversum/ Amsterdam	Casal (3/18); E. Sánchez (3/17)	Krajicek (1/2); Siemerink (1/8)	Haarhuis (5/29); Koevermans (3/3)	Eltingh (8/23); Haarhuis (8/29)	Orsanic (2/7); Siemerink (3/8)	Ríos (1/1); Schalken (1/6)	Johnson (2/16); Montana (5/8)	Kilderry (2/3); Lapentti (1/3)	Eltingh (22/23); Haarhuis (22/29)	Schalken (2/6); Haarhuis (24/29)
Kitzbühel	J. Sánchez (1/13); Winogradsky (1/1)	(Spain) Carbonell (3/18); Roig (1/8)	Casal (9/18); E. Sánchez (8/17)	Garat (1/1); Saad (1/1)	Adams (5/14); Olhovskiy (4/18)	Montana (3/8); Van Emburgh (4/5)	Pimek (10/11); Talbot (4/5)	Arthurs (2/7); Fromberg (2/2)	Kempers (4/4); Orsanic (4/7)	ATP Championship Series
Los Angeles	Davis (3/6); Pate (3/5)	Frana (2/6); Pugh (2/3)	Galbraith (8/21); Pugh (3/3)	W. Ferreira (3/4); Stich (4/5)	Fitzgerald (6/6); Woodforde (10/24)	Haygarth (2/6); Kinnear (3/4)	Barnard (5/6); Norval (4/10)	Lareau (3/6); O'Brien (1/4)	Rafter (6/7); Stolle (7/13)	B. Black (10/13); W. Ferreira (4/4)
Sanremo	Năstase (1/1) (Socialist Federal Republic of Yugoslavia) Prpić (1/1)	Not an event								
Prague	Flégl (2/5); Vacek (2/15)	Flégl (4/5); Suk (1/21)	Nováček (2/6); Stankovič (1/1)	Davids (5/7); Pimek (5/11)	Nováček (4/6); Wilander (1/2)	Pimek (7/11); Talbot (2/5)	Kafelnikov (6/10); Vacek (9/16)	Bhupathi (2/24); Paes (2/28)	Arthurs (3/7); A. Kratzmann (7/8)	Damm (12/26); Štěpánek (1/10)
Long Island	Forget (1/5); Hlasek (2/6)	Jelen (1/2); Steeb (1/2)	Montana (1/8); Van Emburgh (2/5)	Goellner (2/4); Prinosil (3/8)	Delaître (5/11); Forget (4/5)	Suk (8/21); Vacek (7/15)	L. Jensen (5/5); M. Jensen (2/2)	Ondruska (4/4); Prinosil (4/8)	Alonso (2/2); J. Sánchez (12/13)	Delaître (10/11); Santoro (5/10)
San Marino	Flégl (3/5); Vacek (3/15)	(Spain) Arrese (1/2); C. Costa (1/3)	Kulti (2/9); Tillström (1/6)	Orsanic (1/7); Rahnasto (1/1)	Broad (3/5); Van Emburgh (3/5)	(Spain) Arrese (2/2); A. Kratzmann (2/8)	Albano (3/7); Arnold (1/15)	Brandi (2/2); Messori (1/1)	Novák (7/12); Rikl (11/22)	Arnold (3/15); Hood (2/13)
Schenectady	Fromberg (1/2); Pearce (1/2)	J. Sánchez (4/13); Woodbridge (5/34)	Eltingh (5/23); Haarhuis (6/29)	Karbacher (1/1); Olhovskiy (3/18)	Apell (5/8); Björkman (5/26)	Not an event				
Boston	Not an event							Eltingh (19/23); Haarhuis (19/29)	Eltingh (23/23); Haarhuis (23/29)	Cañas (1/1); García (1/8)
Bordeaux/ Bournemouth	(Spain) Carbonell (2/18); Pimek (1/11)	Boetsch (1/2); Forget (2/5)	Casal (10/18); E. Sánchez (9/17)	Albano (2/7); Frana (4/6)	Delaître (6/11); Forget (5/5)	Hiršzon (1/2); Ivanišević (4/6)	Goellner (3/4); Rusedski (2/2)	Kinnear (4/4); Kitinov (1/3)	Broad (5/5); Ullyett (4/23)	Adams (10/14); Tarango (9/12)
Geneva/Cologne	Albano (1/7); Engel (1/1)	Bruguera (2/2); Rosset (1/6)	de la Peña (3/4); Luza (4/4)	Not an event						
Tashkent	Not an event							Santopadre (1/1); Spadea (3/3)	Pescosolido (1/1); Tieleman (1/1)	Ogorodov (1/1); Rosset (6/6)
Bucharest	Not an event			Oosting (2/7); Pimek (6/11)	Arthurs (1/7); Youl (2/2)	Keil (5/5); Tarango (2/12)	Ekerot (2/2); Tarango (4/12)	Lobo (7/9); J. Sánchez (11/13)	Pavel (1/4); Trifu (1/1)	Arnold (5/15); García (2/8)
Brasília	Not an event	Kinnear (1/4); Smith (1/2)	Not an event							
Bogotá	Not an event				Knowles (1/19); Nestor (1/30)	Novák (1/12); Rikl (6/22)	Pereira (3/3); Rikl (9/22)	Lobo (8/9); Meligeni (4/6)	del Río (1/1); Puerta (1/1)	Not an event
Basel	Kruger (1/2) van Rensburg (1/8)	Hlasek (3/6); P. McEnroe (2/9)	Nijssen (3/4); Suk (4/21)	B. Black (2/13); Stark (4/11)	P. McEnroe (7/9); Palmer (5/19)	Suk (9/21); Vacek (8/15)	Kafelnikov (7/10); Vacek (10/15)	Henman (1/1); Rosset (5/6)	Delaître (8/11); Santoro (3/10)	Haygarth (6/6); Kitinov (2/3)
Palermo	Casal (4/18); E. Sánchez (4/17)	Eltingh (1/23); Kempers (1/4)	Donar (1/1); Jonsson (2/2)	Casal (12/18); E. Sánchez (11/17)	Kempers (2/4); Waite (1/3)	(Spain) Corretja (1/2); Santoro (1/10)	A. Kratzmann (3/8); Ondruska (2/4)	A. Kratzmann (5/8); Pimek (11/11)	Johnson (5/16); Montana (8/8)	Hood (3/13); Prieto (2/9)
Brisbane	Stoltenberg (3/5); Woodbridge (2/34)	Woodbridge (6/34); Woodforde (3/24)	DeVries (3/3); Macpherson (5/12)	Not an event						
Kuala Lumpur II	Not an event			Eltingh (9/23); Haarhuis (9/29)	Not an event					
Toulouse	Broad (1/5); Muller (1/6)	Nijssen (1/4); Suk (2/21)	Pearce (2/2); Talbot (1/5)	B. Black (3/13); Stark (5/11)	Oosting (5/7); Vacek (5/15)	Björkman (8/26) de Jager (3/4)	Eltingh (15/23); Haarhuis (15/29)	Eltingh (20/23); Haarhuis (20/29)	Delaître (7/11); Santoro (2/10)	Delaître (11/11); Tarango (10/12)
Athens	Casal (5/18); J. Sánchez (2/13)	Eltingh (2/23); Koevermans (2/3)	(Spain) Carbonell (5/18); Roig (2/8)	de la Peña (4/4); Lozano (3/3)	Lobo (1/9); J. Sánchez (6/13)	Not an event				
Berlin/Bolzano/ Ostrava	Aldrich (1/2); Visser (1/6)	Korda (1/2); Nováček (1/6)	Järryd (4/12); Pedersen (1/1)	Davids (6/7); Norval (2/10)	Damm (5/26); Nováček (5/6)	Björkman (9/26); Frana (6/6)	Stolle (5/13); Suk (10/21)	Novák (5/12); Rikl (10/22)	Kiefer (1/2); Prinosil (5/8)	Not an event
Valencia/Marbella/ Mallorca	Not an event					(Spain) Carbonell (11/18); Roig (7/8)	A. Kratzmann (4/8); Waite (3/3)	Alami (1/1); Alonso (1/2)	Albano (6/7); Orsanic (5/7)	Arnold (4/15) (Spain) Carbonell (14/18)
Tel Aviv	Odizor (2/2); Van Rensburg (2/8)	Rikl (1/22); Schapers (1/1)	Bauer (1/4); Cunha e Silva (1/2)	Casal (13/18); E. Sánchez (12/17)	Bale (3/4) de Jager (2/4)	Grabb (8/10); Palmer (6/19)	Ondruska (3/4); Stafford (1/4)	Not an event	ATP Challenger Series	
Lyon	Galbraith (1/21); Jones (3/4)	Nijssen (2/4); Suk (3/21)	Hlasek (4/6); Rosset (3/6)	Muller (5/6); Visser (5/6)	Hlasek (5/6); Kafelnikov (2/10)	Hlasek (6/6); Kafelnikov (4/10)	Grabb (9/10); Reneberg (6/9)	E. Ferreira (5/10); Galbraith (18/21)	Delaître (9/11); Santoro (4/10)	Norval (6/10); Ullyett (5/23)
Vienna	Riglewski (4/4); Stich (3/5)	Järryd (2/12); Muller (3/6)	Båthman (3/3); Järryd (5/12)	B. Black (4/13); Stark (6/11)	Bauer (4/4); Rikl (5/22)	E. Ferreira (1/10); Siemerink (5/8)	ATP Championship Series			
Guarujá II	Not an event	Eltingh (3/23); Haarhuis (4/29)	Not an event							
Buzios/Santiago	Not an event	Casal (7/18); E. Sánchez (6/17)	Ruah (1/1); Tabares (1/1)	Bauer (3/4); Rikl (3/22)	Nováček (6/6); Wilander (2/2)	Novák (2/12); Rikl (7/22)	Kuerten (1/6); Meligeni (1/6)	Davids (7/7); A. Kratzmann (6/8)	Hood (1/13); Prieto (1/9)	Not an event
Taipei/Beijing	Not an event		Fitzgerald (2/6); Stolle (1/13)	Annacone (2/2); D. Flach (1/2)	Ho (1/3); Kinnear (2/4)	Lareau (2/6); Ho (3/3)	Damm (8/26); Olhovskiy (10/18)	Bhupathi (3/24); Paes (3/28)	Not an event	
São Paulo/ Montevideo	Cannon (1/2); Mora (1/2)	Gómez (1/1); Oncins (1/4)	(Uruguay) Pérez (1/2); Roig (3/8)	Casal (14/18); E. Sánchez (13/17)	Filippini (2/2); Mattar (3/3)	Casal (18/18); E. Sánchez (17/17)	Not an event		ATP Challenger Series	
Moscow	Davids (1/7); Haarhuis (1/29)	Jelen (2/2); Steeb (2/2)	Barnard (1/6) de Jager (1/4)	Eltingh (10/23); Haarhuis (10/29)	Eltingh (12/23); Haarhuis (12/29)	B. Black (6/13); Palmer (7/19)	Leach (8/14); Olhovskiy (11/18)	Damm (10/26); Suk (11/21)	Palmer (8/19); Tarango (5/12)	Gimelstob (6/10); Vacek (15/15)
Wembley	Grabb (1/10); P. McEnroe (1/9)	Not an event								
Birmingham	Not an event	Eltingh (4/23); Wekesa (1/1)	Not an event							
Itaparica	Menezes (1/1); Roese (1/1)	Not an event								
Antwerp	Not an event		Fitzgerald (3/6); Järryd (6/12)	Connell (4/9); Galbraith (10/21)	Apell (6/8); Björkman (6/26)	Not an event	ATP Championship Series			Not an event
Buenos Aires	Not an event			(Spain) Carbonell (8/18); C. Costa (3/3)	Casal (16/18); E. Sánchez (15/17)	Spadea (1/3) van Rensburg (6/8)	Not an event	ATP Challenger Series		
Stockholm	ATP Championship Series, Single Week					Eltingh (14/23); Haarhuis (14/29)	Galbraith (15/21); Stark (9/11)	Goellner (4/4); Reneberg (7/9)	Kulti (7/9); Tillström (4/6)	Norval (7/10); Ullyett (6/23)

=== ATP International Series ===
	2000	2001	2002	2003	2004	2005	2006	2007	2008
Adelaide	Woodbridge (25/34); Woodforde (22/24)	Macpherson (11/12); Stafford (4/4)	W. Black (5/10); Ullyett (12/23)	Coetzee (2/5); Haggard (2/3)	B. Bryan (8/45); M. Bryan (10/45)	Malisse (1/7); O. Rochus (1/1)	Erlich (6/18); A. Ram (6/13)	Moodie (1/5); Perry (4/5)	García (8/8); M. Melo (2/17)
Chennai	Boutter (1/4); C. Rochus (1/1)	B. Black (12/13); W. Black (3/10)	Bhupathi (12/24); Paes (14/28)	Knowle (3/17); Kohlmann (2/5)	Nadal (2/6); Robredo (1/4)	Lu (1/3); Schüttler (1/3)	Mertiňák (1/10); Pála (5/6)	Malisse (2/7); Norman (1/4)	Sa. Ratiwatana (2/2); So. Ratiwatana (2/2)
Doha	Knowles (4/19); Mirnyi (5/20)	Knowles (6/19); Nestor (7/30)	D. Johnson (15/16); Palmer (15/19)	Damm (17/26); Suk (17/21)	Damm (19/26); Suk (19/21)	A. Costa (1/1); Nadal (3/6)	Björkman (21/26); Mirnyi (11/20)	Youzhny (2/7); Zimonjić (9/17)	Kohlschreiber (3/5); Škoch (5/5)
Auckland	E. Ferreira (8/10); Leach (10/14)	Barnard (6/6); Thomas (1/6)	Björkman (14/26); Woodbridge (28/34)	Adams (14/14); Koenig (2/4)	Bhupathi (17/24); Santoro (9/15)	Allegro (1/2); Kohlmann (3/5)	Pavel (2/4); Wassen (1/5)	Coetzee (3/5); Wassen (2/5)	Horna (3/4); Mónaco (1/3)
Sydney	Woodbridge (26/34); Woodforde (23/24)	Nestor (8/30); Stolle (11/13)	D. Johnson (16/16); Palmer (16/19)	Hanley (2/17); Healey (2/3)	Björkman (18/26); Woodbridge (32/34)	Bhupathi (19/24); Woodbridge (34/34)	Santoro (12/15); Zimonjić (6/17)	Hanley (13/17); Ullyett (20/23)	Gasquet (2/2); Tsonga (2/3)
Milan	ATP Int. Series Gold	Haarhuis (27/29); Schalken (4/6)	Braasch (4/6); Olhovskiy (17/18)	Luxa (3/3); Štěpánek (5/10)	Palmer (18/19); Vízner (5/12)	Bracciali (1/6); Galimberti (1/1)	Not an event		
Dubai	Novák (9/12); Rikl (13/22)	ATP International Series Gold							
Santiago/ Viña del Mar	Kuerten (6/6); A. Prieto (1/1)	Arnold (7/15); Carbonell (16/18)	Etlis (1/4); Rodríguez (1/6)	Calleri (1/3); Hood (5/13)	Chela (1/3); Gaudio (1/2)	Ferrer (1/1); Ventura (1/4)	Acasuso (3/4); S. Prieto (6/9)	Capdeville (1/1); Hernández (1/1)	Acasuso (4/4); S. Prieto (8/9)
Marseille	Aspelin (1/8); Landsberg (1/2)	Boutter (3/4); Santoro (7/15)	Clément (2/9); Escudé (1/1)	Grosjean (3/4); Santoro (8/15)	Knowles (12/19); Nestor (14/30)	Damm (21/26); Štěpánek (7/10)	Damm (22/26); Štěpánek (8/10)	Clément (6/9); Llodra (6/13)	Damm (24/26); Vízner (12/12)
Costa do Sauípe	Not an event	Artoni (1/2); D. Melo (1/1)	Humphries (3/3); Merklein (2/4)	Perry (1/5); Shimada (2/2)	Fyrstenberg (2/13); Matkowski (2/12)	Čermák (6/26); Friedl (6/12)	Dlouhý (1/7); Vízner (8/12)	Dlouhý (3/7); Vízner (10/12)	M. Melo (3/17); Sá (3/11)
Zagreb	Not an event						Levinský (2/5); Mertiňák (2/10)	Kohlmann (5/5); Waske (3/3)	Hanley (14/17); Kerr (7/8)
Bogotá	Albano (7/7); Arnold (6/15)	Hood (4/13); S. Prieto (3/9)	Not an event		ATP Challenger Tour				
San Jose	Gambill (1/4); Humphries (1/3)	Knowles (7/19); MacPhie (3/5)	W. Black (6/10); Ullyett (13/23)	Lee (1/1); Voltchkov (1/1)	Blake (2/6); Fish (2/5)	Arthurs (6/7); Hanley (5/17)	Björkman (22/26); J. McEnroe (3/3)	Butorac (1/16); J. Murray (1/22)	Lipsky (1/15); D. Martin (1/1)
Copenhagen	Damm (13/26); Prinosil (6/8)	W. Black (4/10); Ullyett (10/23)	Kohlmann (1/5); Knowle (1/17)	Cibulec (2/2); Vízner (4/12)	Not an event				
Buenos Aires	Not an event	Arnold (8/15); Carbonell (17/18)	Etlis (2/4); Rodríguez (2/6)	Hood (6/13); S. Prieto (4/9)	Arnold (12/15); Hood (9/13)	Čermák (5/26); Friedl (5/12)	Čermák (10/26); Friedl (10/12)	García (7/8); S. Prieto (7/9)	Calleri (3/3); Horna (4/4)
Delray Beach	MacPhie (2/5); Zimonjić (2/17)	Gambill (2/4); Roddick (1/3)	Damm (15/26); Suk (15/21)	Paes (16/28); Zimonjić (4/17)	Paes (20/28); Štěpánek (6/10)	Aspelin (4/8); Perry (2/5)	Knowles (14/19); Nestor (16/30)	Armando (1/1); Malisse (3/7)	Mirnyi (13/20); J. Murray (3/22)
Scottsdale/ Las Vegas	Palmer (10/19); Reneberg (10/10)	D. Johnson (11/16); Palmer (11/19)	B. Bryan (4/45); M. Bryan (4/45)	Blake (1/6); Merklein (3/4)	Leach (13/14); MacPhie (4/5)	B. Bryan (12/45); M. Bryan (14/45)	B. Bryan (15/45); M. Bryan (17/45)	B. Bryan (18/45); M. Bryan (20/45)	Benneteau (3/8); Llodra (8/13)
Atlanta	E. Ferreira (9/10); Leach (11/14)	Bhupathi (10/24); Paes (12/28)	Not an event						
Estoril	D. Johnson (8/16); Norval (8/10)	Štěpánek (2/10); Tabara (1/1)	Braasch (5/6); Olhovskiy (18/18)	Bhupathi (15/24); Mirnyi (8/20)	Chela (2/3); Gaudio (2/2)	Čermák (8/26); Friedl (8/12)	Dlouhý (2/7); Vízner (9/12)	M. Melo (1/17); Sá (2/11)	Coetzee (5/5); Moodie (3/5)
Casablanca	Clément (1/9); Grosjean (1/4)	Hill (2/2); Tarango (12/12)	Huss (1/3); Wakefield (1/1)	Čermák (3/26); Friedl (3/12)	Artoni (2/2); Vicente (1/2)	Čermák (7/26); Friedl (7/12)	Knowle (7/17); Melzer (2/10)	Kerr (5/8); Škoch (4/5)	Montañés (1/2); Ventura (2/4)
Orlando/ Houston	Paes (11/28); Siemerink (8/8)	Bhupathi (11/24); Paes (13/28)	Fish (1/5); Roddick (2/3)	Knowles (9/19); Nestor (11/30)	Blake (3/6); Fish (3/5)	Knowles (13/19); Nestor (15/30)	Kohlmann (4/5); Waske (1/3)	B. Bryan (19/45); M. Bryan (21/45)	Gulbis (1/2); Schüttler (2/3)
Majorca/ Valencia	Llodra (1/13); Nargiso (4/4)	D. Johnson (12/16); Palmer (12/19)	Bhupathi (13/24); Paes (15/28)	Arnold (10/15); Hood (7/13)	Etlis (3/4); Rodríguez (4/6)	F. González (1/2); Rodríguez (6/6)	Škoch (2/5); Zib (1/1)	Moodie (2/5); Perry (5/5)	M. Gonzalez (1/13); Mónaco (2/3)
Munich	Adams (11/14) de Jager (4/4)	Luxa (1/3); Štěpánek (3/10)	Luxa (2/3); Štěpánek (4/10)	W. Black (10/10); Ullyett (17/23)	Blake (4/6); Merklein (4/4)	Ančić (2/5); Knowle (5/17)	Pavel (3/4); Waske (2/3)	Kohlschreiber (2/5); Youzhny (3/7)	Berrer (1/1); Schüttler (3/3)
St. Pölten/ Pörtschach	Bhupathi (9/24); Kratzmann (8/8)	Pála (1/6); Rikl (15/22)	Pála (2/6); Rikl (16/22)	Aspelin (2/8); Bertolini (1/2)	Hood (10/13); Pála (3/6)	Arnold (15/15); Hanley (6/17)	Hanley (10/17); Thomas (5/6)	Aspelin (6/8); Knowle (8/17)	M. Melo (4/17); Sá (4/11)
Halle	Kulti (8/9); Tillström (5/6)	Nestor (9/30); Stolle (12/13)	Prinosil (8/8); Rikl (18/22)	Björkman (16/26); Woodbridge (30/34)	Paes (18/28); Rikl (21/22)	Allegro (2/2); Federer (3/3)	Santoro (13/15); Zimonjić (7/17)	Aspelin (7/8); Knowle (9/17)	Youzhny (4/7); M. Zverev (1/2)
London	Woodbridge (27/34); Woodforde (24/24)	B. Bryan (1/45); M. Bryan (1/47)	W. Black (7/10); Ullyett (14/23)	Knowles (10/19); Nestor (12/30)	B. Bryan (9/45); M. Bryan (11/45)	B. Bryan (13/45); M. Bryan (15/45)	Hanley (11/17); Ullyett (18/23)	Knowles (16/19); Nestor (18/30)	Nestor (20/30); Zimonjić (12/17)
's-Hertogenbosch	Damm (14/26); Suk (14/21)	Haarhuis (28/29); Schalken (5/6)	Damm (16/26); Suk (16/21)	Damm (18/26); Suk (18/21)	Damm (20/26); Suk (20/21)	Suk (21/21); Vízner (7/12)	Damm (23/26); Paes (22/28)	Coetzee (4/5); Wassen (3/5)	Ančić (5/5); Melzer (4/10)
Nottingham	D. Johnson (9/16); Norval (9/10)	D. Johnson (13/16); Palmer (13/19)	M. Bryan (5/45); Knowles (8/19)	B. Bryan (7/45); M. Bryan (9/45)	Hanley (4/17); Woodbridge (33/34)	Erlich (5/18); A. Ram (5/13)	Erlich (7/18); A. Ram (7/13)	Butorac (2/16); J. Murray (2/22)	Soares (1/19); Ullyett (21/23)
Båstad	Kulti (9/9); Tillström (6/6)	Braasch (2/6); Knippschild (1/2)	Björkman (15/26); Woodbridge (29/34)	Aspelin (3/8); Bertolini (2/2)	Björkman (19/26); Bhupathi (18/24)	Björkman (20/26); J. Johansson (1/1)	Björkman (23/26); T. Johansson (1/1)	Aspelin (8/8); Knowle (10/17)	Björkman (25/26); Söderling (1/1)
Gstaad	Novák (10/12); Rikl (14/22)	Federer (1/3); Safin (1/2)	Eagle (1/2); Rikl (17/22)	Paes (17/28); Rikl (20/22)	Paes (19/28); Rikl (22/22)	Čermák (9/26); Friedl (9/12)	Novák (12/12); Pavel (4/4)	Čermák (12/26); Vízner (11/12)	Levinský (4/5); Polášek (1/13)
Newport	Erlich (1/18); Levy (1/1)	B. Bryan (2/45); M. Bryan (2/45)	B. Bryan (5/45); M. Bryan (6/45)	Kerr (1/8); Macpherson (12/12)	Kerr (2/8); Thomas (2/6)	Kerr (4/8); Thomas (4/6)	Kendrick (1/1); Melzer (3/10)	Kerr (6/8); Thomas (6/6)	Fish (4/5); Isner (1/2)
Amsterdam/ Amersfoort	Schneiter (1/2); Roitman (1/2)	Haarhuis (29/29); Schalken (6/6)	Coetzee (1/5); Haggard (1/3)	Bowen (1/1); Fisher (1/3)	Levinský (1/5); Škoch (1/5)	García (4/8); Horna (1/4)	A. Martín (2/3); Vicente (2/2)	Brzezicki (1/1); Guzman (1/1)	Čermák (13/26); Wassen (4/5)
Indianapolis	ATP International Series Gold			Ančić (1/5); A. Ram (1/13)	Kerr (3/8); Thomas (3/6)	Hanley (7/17); Oliver (4/4)	Reynolds (1/1); Roddick (3/3)	del Potro (1/1); Parrott (2/3)	Fisher (3/3); Phillips (1/1)
Umag	López Morón (1/2); Portas (1/1)	Schneiter (2/2); Roitman (2/2)	Čermák (1/26); Knowle (2/17)	López Morón (2/2); Nadal (1/6)	Acasuso (1/4); Saretta (1/1)	Novák (11/12); Pála (4/6)	Levinský (3/5); Škoch (3/5)	Dlouhý (4/7); Mertiňák (3/10)	Mertiňák (5/10); Pála (6/6)
Stuttgart	ATP International Series Gold		Eagle (2/2); Rikl (19/22)	ATP International Series Gold					
Los Angeles	Kilderry (3/3); Stolle (9/13)	B. Bryan (3/45); M. Bryan (3/45)	Grosjean (2/4); Kiefer (2/2)	Gambill (4/4); Parrott (1/3)	B. Bryan (10/45); M. Bryan (12/45)	Leach (14/14); MacPhie (5/5)	B. Bryan (16/45); M. Bryan (18/45)	B. Bryan (20/45); M. Bryan (22/45)	Bopanna (1/14); Butorac (3/16)
San Marino	Cibulec (1/2); Friedl (1/12)	ATP Challenger Tour							
Sopot/ Warsaw	Not an event	Hanley (1/17); Healey (1/3)	Čermák (2/26); Friedl (2/12)	Fyrstenberg (1/13); Matkowski (1/12)	Čermák (4/26); Friedl (4/12)	Fyrstenberg (3/13); Matkowski (3/12)	Čermák (11/26); Friedl (11/12)	Fyrstenberg (5/13); Matkowski (5/12)	Fyrstenberg (6/13); Matkowski (6/12)
Washington, D.C.	ATP International Series Gold			Kafelnikov (10/10); Sargsian (1/2)	Haggard (3/3); Koenig (4/4)	B. Bryan (14/45); M. Bryan (16/45)	B. Bryan (17/45); M. Bryan (19/45)	B. Bryan (21/45); M. Bryan (23/45)	Gicquel (1/4); Lindstedt (2/18)
Long Island New Haven	Stark (10/11); Ullyett (7/23)	Stark (11/11); Ullyett (11/23)	Bhupathi (14/24); M. Bryan (7/45)	Koenig (3/4); Rodríguez (3/6)	Dupuis (1/1); Llodra (2/13)	Etlis (4/4); Rodríguez (5/6)	Erlich (8/18); A. Ram (8/13)	Bhupathi (22/24); Zimonjić (10/17)	M. Melo (5/17); Sá (5/11)
Tashkent	Gimelstob (7/10); Humphries (2/3)	Boutter (4/4); Hrbatý (1/1)	Adams (12/14); Koenig (1/4)	Not an event					
Bucharest	A. Martín (1/3); Ran (1/1)	Kitinov (3/3); Landsberg (2/2)	Knippschild (2/2); Nyborg (3/3)	Braasch (6/6); Sargsian (2/2)	Arnold (13/15); Hood (11/13)	Acasuso (2/4); S. Prieto (5/9)	Fyrstenberg (4/13); Matkowski (4/12)	Marach (1/18); Mertiňák (4/10)	Devilder (1/1); Mathieu (1/1)
Beijing	Not an event				Gimelstob (8/10); Oliver (2/4)	Gimelstob (10/10); Healey (3/3)	Ančić (3/5); Bhupathi (20/24)	de Voest (1/1); Fisher (2/3)	Huss (2/3); Hutchins (1/5)
Palermo	Carbonell (15/18); García (3/8)	Carbonell (18/18); Orsanic (7/7)	Arnold (9/15); Lobo (9/9)	Arnold (11/15); Hood (8/13)	Arnold (14/15); Hood (12/13)	García (5/8); Hood (13/13)	García (6/8); Horna (2/4)	Not an event	
Hong Kong	W. Black (2/10); Ullyett (8/23)	Braasch (3/6); Sá (1/11)	Gambill (3/4); Oliver (1/4)	Not an event					
Toulouse	Boutter (2/4); Santoro (6/15)	Not an event							
Shanghai/ Ho Chi Minh City/ Mumbai	Haarhuis (25/29); Schalken (3/6)	B. Black (13/13); Shimada (1/2)	Not an event	Arthurs (5/7); Hanley (3/17)	Palmer (19/19); Vízner (6/12)	Burgsmüller (1/1); Kohlschreiber (1/5)	Ančić (4/5); Bhupathi (21/24)	Lindstedt (1/18); Nieminen (1/5)	Not an event
Bangkok	Not an event			Erlich (2/18); A. Ram (2/13)	Gimelstob (9/10); Oliver (3/4)	Hanley (8/17); Paes (21/28)	Erlich (9/18); A. Ram (9/13)	Sa. Ratiwatana (1/1); So. Ratiwatana (1/1)	Dlouhý (5/7); Paes (23/28)
Metz	Not an event			Benneteau (1/8); Mahut (1/15)	Clément (3/9); Mahut (2/15)	Llodra (4/13); Santoro (10/15)	Gasquet (1/2); Santoro (14/15)	Clément (7/9); Llodra (7/13)	Clément (8/9); Llodra (9/13)
Moscow	Björkman (13/26); Prinosil (7/8)	Mirnyi (6/20); Stolle (13/13)	Federer (2/3); Mirnyi (7/20)	Bhupathi (16/24); Mirnyi (9/20)	Andreev (1/1); Davydenko (1/2)	Mirnyi (10/20); Youzhny (1/7)	Santoro (15/15); Zimonjić (8/17)	Safin (2/2); Tursunov (1/5)	Starace (1/4); Stakhovsky (1/3)
Lyon	Haarhuis (26/29); Stolle (10/13)	Nestor (10/30); Zimonjić (3/17)	W. Black (8/10); Ullyett (15/23)	Erlich (3/18); A. Ram (3/13)	Erlich (4/18); A. Ram (4/13)	Llodra (5/13); Santoro (11/15)	Benneteau (2/8); Clément (5/9)	Grosjean (4/4); Tsonga (1/3)	Llodra (10/13); A. Ram (10/13)
Stockholm	Knowles (5/19); Nestor (6/30)	D. Johnson (14/16); Palmer (14/19)	W. Black (9/10); Ullyett (16/23)	Björkman (17/26); Woodbridge (31/34)	F. López (1/2); Verdasco (1/4)	Arthurs (7/7); Hanley (9/17)	Hanley (12/17); Ullyett (19/23)	Björkman (24/26); Mirnyi (12/20)	Björkman (26/26); Ullyett (22/23)
Basel	D. Johnson (10/16); Norval (10/10)	E. Ferreira (10/10); Leach (12/14)	B. Bryan (6/45); M. Bryan (8/45)	Knowles (11/19); Nestor (13/30)	B. Bryan (11/45); M. Bryan (13/45)	Calleri (2/3); F. González (2/2)	Knowles (15/19); Nestor (17/30)	B. Bryan (22/45); M. Bryan (24/45)	Bhupathi (23/24); Knowles (17/19)
St. Petersburg	Nestor (5/30); Ullyett (9/23)	Golovanov (1/1); Kafelnikov (9/10)	Adams (13/14); Palmer (17/19)	Knowle (4/17); Zimonjić (5/17)	Clément (4/9); Llodra (3/13)	Knowle (6/17); Melzer (1/10)	Aspelin (5/8); Perry (3/5)	Nestor (19/30); Zimonjić (11/17)	Parrott (3/3); Polášek (2/13)
Brighton	Hill (1/2); Tarango (11/12)	Not an event							

== See also ==
- ATP International Series Gold
- List of tennis tournaments
