= 1990 ATP German Open =

Men's tennis tournament

- Date: 7–14 May
- Edition: 84th
- Category: ATP Championship Series, Single Week
- Draw: 56S / 28D
- Prize money: $750,000
- Surface: Clay / outdoor
- Location: Hamburg, West Germany
- Venue: Rothenbaum Tennis Center

Champions

Singles
- (Spain) Juan Aguilera

Doubles
- (Spain) Sergi Bruguera / (United States) Jim Courier
- Hamburg European Open

The 1990 German Open was a men's tennis tournament played on outdoor clay courts. It was the 84th edition of the Hamburg Masters (Hamburg Masters), and was part of the ATP Championship Series, Single Week category of the 1990 ATP Tour. It took place at the Rothenbaum Tennis Center in Hamburg, West Germany, from 7 May through 14 May 1990.

The men's field was headlined by ATP No. 3, Brussels, Stuttgart titlist, Australian Open, Monte Carlo quarter-finalist Boris Becker, Miami, San Francisco winner, recent Indian Wells finalist Andre Agassi and Tokyo Indoor winner and US Open semi-finalist Aaron Krickstein. Other top seeds were Estoril titlist Emilio Sánchez, Jay Berger, Andrés Gómez and Michael Chang.

== Finals ==
=== Singles ===
(Spain) Juan Aguilera defeated (Germany) Boris Becker, 6–1, 6–0, 7–6^{(9–7)}

- It was Juan Aguilera's 2nd title of the year, and his 5th overall. It was his 1st Masters title of the year, and overall.

=== Doubles ===
(Spain) Sergi Bruguera / (United States) Jim Courier defeated (Germany) Udo Riglewski / (Germany) Michael Stich, 7–6, 6–2
