= 1990 Sanremo Open =

- Date: 30 July – 6 August
- Edition: Only
- Category: World Series
- Draw: 32S / 16D
- Prize money: $225,000
- Surface: Clay / outdoor
- Location: Sanremo, Italy

Champions

Singles
- (Spain) Jordi Arrese

Doubles
- (Romania) Mihnea-Ion Năstase / (Socialist Federal Republic of Yugoslavia) Goran Prpić
| Sanremo Open |

The 1990 Sanremo Open was a men's tennis tournament played on outdoor clay courts held in Sanremo, Italy that was part of the World Series of the 1991 ATP Tour. It was the only edition of the tournament and was held from 30 July to 6 August 1991. Seventh-seeded Jordi Arrese won the singles title.

== Finals ==
=== Singles ===
(Spain) Jordi Arrese defeated (Spain) Juan Aguilera, 6–2, 6–2

- It was Arrese's first singles title of his career.

=== Doubles ===
(Romania) Mihnea-Ion Năstase / (Socialist Federal Republic of Yugoslavia) Goran Prpić defeated (Sweden) Ola Jonsson / (Sweden) Fredrik Nilsson 3–6, 7–6, 6–3

- It was Năstase's only doubles title of his career. It was Prpić's only doubles title of his career.
