= Joost Wijnhoud =

Dutch tennis player

- Country (sports): Netherlands
- Born: 10 June 1969 (age 55)

Singles
- Highest ranking: No. 393 (27 Jul 1992)

Grand Slam singles results
- US Open: Q2 (1992)

Doubles
- Career record: 0–1 (ATP Tour)
- Highest ranking: No. 283 (12 Oct 1992)

Joost Wijnhoud (born 10 June 1969) is a Dutch former professional tennis player.

Wijnhoud reached a career best singles ranking of 393 in the world, competing mostly in satellite tournaments. He played in the qualifying draw at the 1992 US Open and won his first match, over Jordi Burillo. As a doubles player he won an ATP Challenger tournament in Segovia partnering Mike van den Berg, with whom he also made his only ATP Tour main draw appearance, as qualifiers at the 1992 Dutch Open.

== ATP Challenger titles ==
=== Doubles: (1) ===
No.	Date	Tournament	Surface	Partner	Opponents	Score
1.	Aug 1992	Open Castilla y León; Segovia, Spain	Hard	(Netherlands) Mike van den Berg	(Nigeria) Nduka Odizor (Argentina) Roberto Saad	7–6, 7–6
