= Ettore Rossetti =

Italian tennis player

- Country (sports): Italy
- Born: 7 July 1968 (age 56); Santa Croce sull'Arno, Italy
- Prize money: $20,531

Singles
- Career record: 0–1
- Highest ranking: No. 274 (20 April 1992)

Grand Slam singles results
- Australian Open: Q1 (1993)
- US Open: Q3 (1992)

Doubles
- Career record: 2–2
- Highest ranking: No. 219 (15 April 1991)

Ettore Rossetti (born 7 July 1968) is an Italian former professional tennis player.

A native of Tuscany, Rossetti reached a career high singles ranking of 274 in the world.

Rossetti featured in his only ATP Tour singles main draw at the San Marino Open in 1990, but he made two further main draws in doubles, including an appearance in the semi-finals of the 1990 Sanremo Open with Marcello Bassanelli.

On the ATP Challenger Tour, Rossetti was the singles runner-up at the Bangalore tournament in 1992 and had a win over Guillermo Vilas at an event in Santiago that same year, which was the Argentine veteran's final season on tour.

Rossetti made it through to the final qualifying round at the 1992 US Open.
