= 1990 ATP German Open – Doubles =

Doubles
- 1990 ATP German Open
- 1989 Champions: (Spain) Emilio Sánchez (Spain) Javier Sánchez

Final
- Champions: (Spain) Sergi Bruguera (United States) Jim Courier
- Runners-up: (West Germany) Udo Riglewski (West Germany) Michael Stich
- Score: 4–6, 6–1, 7–6

Details
- Draw: 28
- Seeds: 8

Events
| Singles | Doubles |
- ATP German Open

== Seeds ==
Champion seeds are indicated in bold text while text in italics indicates the round in which those seeds were eliminated. The top four seeded teams received byes into the second round.

1. (Sweden) Anders Järryd / (Spain) Emilio Sánchez (second round)
2. (Ecuador) Andrés Gómez / (Spain) Javier Sánchez (second round)
3. (France) Guy Forget / (Switzerland) Jakob Hlasek (quarterfinals)
4. (Mexico) Jorge Lozano / (United States) Todd Witsken (quarterfinals)
5. (United States) Kevin Curren / (Australia) Laurie Warder (first round)
6. (Czechoslovakia) Petr Korda / (Czechoslovakia) Tomáš Šmíd (second round)
7. (Iran) Mansour Bahrami / (France) Éric Winogradsky (second round)
8. (Denmark) Michael Mortensen / (Netherlands) Tom Nijssen (first round)

== Draw ==
Key

- Q = Qualifier
- WC = Wild card
- LL = Lucky loser
- Alt = Alternate
- ITF = ITF entry
- PR = Protected ranking
- SR = Special ranking
- SE = Special exempt
- JE = Junior exempt
- JR = Junior Accelerator Programme entrant
- CO = College Accelerator Programme entrant
- NG = Next Gen Accelerator Program entrant
- w/o = Walkover
- r = Retired
- d = Defaulted

=== Finals ===
| Final |
| WC | (Spain) **Sergi Bruguera** (United States) **Jim Courier** | 4 | **6** | **7** |
| | (West Germany) Udo Riglewski (West Germany) Michael Stich | **6** | 1 | 6 |

=== Top half ===
First round
Q | (Argentina) **P Albano** (Argentina) **H de la Peña** | **6** | **6**
WC | (West Germany) E Jelen (West Germany) M Westphal | 1 | 3
WC | (West Germany) P Kühnen (West Germany) M Zoecke | 2 | 3
(Argentina) **G Luza** (Brazil) **C Motta** | **6** | **6**
(Netherlands) P Haarhuis (Netherlands) M Schapers | **7** | 4 | 6
7 | (Iran) **M Bahrami** (France) **É Winogradsky** | 6 | **6** | **7**
(Czechoslovakia) T Anzari (Czechoslovakia) D Rikl | 2 | 3
(Argentina) **J Frana** (Brazil) **L Mattar** | **6** | **6**
(Argentina) M Jaite (Uruguay) D Pérez | 4 | 4
(Sweden) **D Engel** (Sweden) **P Henricsson** | **6** | **6**
WC | (Spain) **S Bruguera** (United States) **J Courier** | 4 | **6** | **7**
5 | (United States) K Curren (Australia) L Warder | **6** | 4 | 6

Second round
1 | (Sweden) A Järryd (Spain) E Sánchez | 2 | 4
Q | (Argentina) **P Albano** (Argentina) **H de la Peña** | **6** | **6**
(Argentina) **G Luza** (Brazil) **C Motta** | **6** | **6**
7 | (Iran) M Bahrami (France) É Winogradsky | 4 | 1
3 | (France) **G Forget** (Switzerland) **J Hlasek** | **6** | **7**
(Argentina) J Frana (Brazil) L Mattar | 4 | 5
(Sweden) D Engel (Sweden) P Henricsson | **7** | 6 | 4
WC | (Spain) **S Bruguera** (United States) **J Courier** | 5 | **7** | **6**

Quarterfinals
Q | (Argentina) P Albano (Argentina) H de la Peña | 5 | **6** | 2
(Argentina) **G Luza** (Brazil) **C Motta** | **7** | 2 | **6**
3 | (France) G Forget (Switzerland) J Hlasek | 2 | 4
WC | (Spain) **S Bruguera** (United States) **J Courier** | **6** | **6**

Semifinals
(Argentina) G Luza (Brazil) C Motta | 1 | 3
WC | (Spain) **S Bruguera** (United States) **J Courier** | **6** | **6**

=== Bottom half ===
First round
6 | (Czechoslovakia) **P Korda** (Czechoslovakia) **T Šmíd** | **6** | **7**
(South Africa) S Kruger (South Africa) B Talbot | 3 | 5
(Uruguay) M Filippini (France) J-P Fleurian | 2 | 6 | 6
(West Germany) **U Riglewski** (West Germany) **M Stich** | **6** | **7**
(Socialist Federal Republic of Yugoslavia) **G Ivanišević** (Hungary) **B Taróczy** | **6** | **6**
(Czechoslovakia) K Nováček (Czechoslovakia) M Šrejber | 4 | 3
8 | (Denmark) M Mortensen (Netherlands) T Nijssen | 4 | 5
(Sweden) **R Båthman** (Australia) **D Macpherson** | **6** | **7**
(United States) **C Beckman** (United States) **L Jensen** | **6** | **7**
(Brazil) D Marcelino (Brazil) M Menezes | 3 | 6
Q | (Sweden) R Bergh (Sweden) M Gustafsson | 4 | 4
(Czechoslovakia) **J Čihák** (Czechoslovakia) **C Suk** | **6** | **6**

Second round
6 | (Czechoslovakia) P Korda (Czechoslovakia) T Šmíd | **6** | 6 | 6
(West Germany) **U Riglewski** (West Germany) **M Stich** | 3 | **7** | **7**
(Socialist Federal Republic of Yugoslavia) G Ivanišević (Hungary) B Taróczy | 1 | 3
4 | (Mexico) **J Lozano** (United States) **T Witsken** | **6** | **6**
(Sweden) R Båthman (Australia) D Macpherson | 2 | 5
(United States) **C Beckman** (United States) **L Jensen** | **6** | **7**
(Czechoslovakia) **J Čihák** (Czechoslovakia) **C Suk** | 3 | **6** | **6**
2 | (Ecuador) A Gómez (Spain) J Sánchez | **6** | 3 | 2

Quarterfinals
(West Germany) **U Riglewski** (West Germany) **M Stich** | 4 | **6** | **7**
4 | (Mexico) J Lozano (United States) T Witsken | **6** | 1 | 6
(United States) C Beckman (United States) L Jensen | 2 | 5
(Czechoslovakia) **J Čihák** (Czechoslovakia) **C Suk** | **6** | **7**

Semifinals
(West Germany) **U Riglewski** (West Germany) **M Stich** | **7** | **6**
(Czechoslovakia) J Čihák (Czechoslovakia) C Suk | 6 | 2
