= 1990 ATP German Open – Singles =

Singles
- 1990 ATP German Open

Final
- Champion: (Spain) Juan Aguilera
- Runner-up: (West Germany) Boris Becker
- Score: 6–1, 6–0, 7–6^{(9–7)}

Details
- Draw: 56
- Seeds: 16

Events
Singles	Doubles
← 1989 ·	ATP German Open	· 1991 →

Juan Aguilera defeated Boris Becker in the final, 6–1, 6–0, 7–6^{(9–7)} to win the singles tennis title at the 1990 Hamburg European Open.

Ivan Lendl was the reigning champion, but did not compete this year.

== Seeds ==
A champion seed is indicated in bold text while text in italics indicates the round in which that seed was eliminated. The top eight seeds received a bye to the second round.

1. (West Germany) Boris Becker (final)
2. (United States) Andre Agassi (third round)
3. (United States) Aaron Krickstein (third round)
4. (Spain) Emilio Sánchez (third round)
5. (United States) Jay Berger (quarterfinals)
6. (Ecuador) Andrés Gómez (second round)
7. (United States) Michael Chang (second round)
8. (Soviet Union) ~~Andrei Cherkasov~~ (withdrew)
9. (Argentina) Martín Jaite (first round)
10. (United States) Jim Courier (third round)
11. (West Germany) Carl-Uwe Steeb (second round)
12. (Austria) ~~Thomas Muster~~ (withdrew)
13. (Austria) Horst Skoff (first round)
14. (Argentina) Guillermo Pérez Roldán (first round)
15. (Sweden) Magnus Gustafsson (quarterfinals)
16. (Argentina) Alberto Mancini (first round)

== Draw ==
=== Key ===
- Q = Qualifier
- WC = Wild card
- LL = Lucky loser
- Alt = Alternate
- SE = Special exempt
- PR = Protected ranking
- ITF = ITF entry
- JE = Junior exempt
- w/o = Walkover
- r = Retired
- d = Defaulted
- SR = Special ranking

=== Finals ===
Semifinals
1	(West Germany) **Boris Becker**	**6**	3	**6**
WC	(France) Henri Leconte	3	**6**	3
(France) Guy Forget	5	6
(Spain) **Juan Aguilera**	**7**	**7**

Final
1	(West Germany) Boris Becker	1	0	6
(Spain) **Juan Aguilera**	**6**	**6**	**7**

=== Top half ===
==== Section 1 ====
First round
(United States) K Curren	6	4
(Italy) **P Canè**	**7**	**6**
WC	(West Germany) M Zoecke	2	2
(Soviet Union) **A Cherkasov**	**6**	**6**
WC	(West Germany) **J Wöhrmann**	**6**	**6**
16	(Argentina) A Mancini	0	2
9	(Argentina) M Jaite	**6**	5	3
(United States) **J Arias**	3	**7**	**6**
(Switzerland) **J Hlasek**	**7**	**6**
(West Germany) M Stich	6	4
Q	(Sweden) J Apell	1	2
WC	(West Germany) **U Riglewski**	**6**	**6**

Second round
1	(West Germany) **B Becker**	**7**	**6**
(Italy) P Canè	5	1
(Soviet Union) **A Cherkasov**	**6**	**6**
WC	(West Germany) J Wöhrmann	4	1
(United States) **J Arias**	**6**	2	**6**
(Switzerland) J Hlasek	4	**6**	2
WC	(West Germany) U Riglewski	0	4
LL	(Sweden) **L Jönsson**	**6**	**6**

Third round
1	(West Germany) **B Becker**	**6**	**6**
(Soviet Union) A Cherkasov	2	3
(United States) **J Arias**	**6**	**6**
LL	(Sweden) L Jönsson	1	2

Quarterfinals
1	(West Germany) **B Becker**	**6**	**6**
(United States) J Arias	3	1

==== Section 2 ====
First round
(Peru) **J Yzaga**	**6**	**6**
(Czechoslovakia) M Šrejber	2	3
(United States) T Witsken	6	**6**	2
WC	(France) **H Leconte**	**7**	2	**6**
(Spain) **J Arrese**	3
13	(Austria) H Skoff	1^{r}
LL	(Argentina) **F Davín**	**7**	**6**
Q	(Sweden) C Bergström	5	2
(West Germany) E Jelen	5	4
(Haiti) **R Agénor**	**7**	**6**
(Brazil) **L Mattar**	**6**	**7**
Q	(Italy) C Pistolesi	4	5

Second round
3	(United States) **A Krickstein**	**7**	**6**
(Peru) J Yzaga	6	2
WC	(France) **H Leconte**	**6**	1	**6**
(Spain) J Arrese	4	**6**	2
LL	(Argentina) **F Davín**	**6**	2	**6**
(Haiti) R Agénor	3	**6**	2
(Brazil) **L Mattar**	6	**7**	**6**
6	(Ecuador) A Gómez	**7**	6	3

Third round
3	(United States) A Krickstein	4	4
WC	(France) **H Leconte**	**6**	**6**
LL	(Argentina) **F Davín**	**6**	**6**
(Brazil) L Mattar	0	2

Quarterfinals
WC	(France) **H Leconte**	**6**	**6**
LL	(Argentina) F Davín	3	3

=== Bottom half ===
==== Section 3 ====
First round
WC	(West Germany) **P Kühnen**	6	**6**	**6**
Q	(France) T Champion	**7**	2	4
Q	(Argentina) **R Azar**	**7**	1	**6**
(France) J-P Fleurian	6	**6**	4
(Spain) J Sánchez	4	**6**	4
11	(West Germany) **C-U Steeb**	**6**	2	**6**
14	(Argentina) G Pérez Roldán	0	3
(Socialist Federal Republic of Yugoslavia) **G Prpić**	**6**	**6**
(France) **G Forget**	**6**	**7**
(Czechoslovakia) K Nováček	4	5
(Czechoslovakia) P Korda	2	**6**	6
Q	(France) **F Santoro**	**6**	3	**7**

Second round
5	(United States) **J Berger**	**6**	**6**
WC	(West Germany) P Kühnen	2	2
Q	(Argentina) **R Azar**	**6**	4	**7**
11	(West Germany) C-U Steeb	2	**6**	5
(Socialist Federal Republic of Yugoslavia) G Prpić	6	**6**	4
(France) **G Forget**	**7**	3	**6**
Q	(France) F Santoro	**6**	1	1
4	(Spain) **E Sánchez**	4	**6**	**6**

Third round
5	(United States) **J Berger**	3	**6**	**6**
Q	(Argentina) R Azar	**6**	2	3
(France) **G Forget**	**7**	**6**
4	(Spain) E Sánchez	6	4

Quarterfinals
5	(United States) J Berger	3	**6**	4
(France) **G Forget**	**6**	3	**6**

==== Section 4 ====
First round
(Socialist Federal Republic of Yugoslavia) G Ivanišević	4	1
(Spain) **J Aguilera**	**6**	**6**
(Netherlands) **P Haarhuis**	**6**	**6**
(Israel) A Mansdorf	0	3
(Sweden) J Gunnarsson	**7**	4	2
10	(United States) **J Courier**	6	**6**	**6**
15	(Sweden) **M Gustafsson**	**6**	**6**
(Spain) S Bruguera	2	4
(Soviet Union) A Volkov	2	5
(Uruguay) **M Filippini**	**6**	**7**
Q	(Uruguay) **D Pérez**	**6**	3	**7**
(Sweden) J Svensson	3	**6**	6

Second round
7	(United States) M Chang	3	2
(Spain) **J Aguilera**	**6**	**6**
(Netherlands) P Haarhuis	1	1
10	(United States) **J Courier**	**6**	**6**
15	(Sweden) **M Gustafsson**	**6**	5	**6**
(Uruguay) M Filippini	3	**7**	3
Q	(Uruguay) D Pérez	1	0	r
2	(United States) **A Agassi**	**6**	**1**

Third round
(Spain) **J Aguilera**	1	**6**	**6**
10	(United States) J Courier	**6**	4	4
15	(Sweden) **M Gustafsson**	**7**	**7**
2	(United States) A Agassi	6	6

Quarterfinals
(Spain) **J Aguilera**	**6**	**6**
15	(Sweden) M Gustafsson	1	4
