= Fredrik Nilsson (tennis) =

Swedish tennis player

- Full name: Fredrik Nilsson
- Country (sports): Sweden
- Born: 1 November 1969 (age 55); Kristianstad, Sweden
- Prize money: $31,176

Singles
- Highest ranking: No. 561 (26 June 1989)

Doubles
- Career record: 15–18
- Career titles: 0
- Highest ranking: No. 110 (6 August 1990)

Grand Slam doubles results
- US Open: 1R (1990)

Fredrik Nilsson (born 1 November 1969) is a former professional tennis player from Sweden.

== Biography ==
Nilsson only competed professionally on tour for two years, mostly in doubles tournaments.

He won a Challenger title in Pescara in 1989 and that year made the semi-finals of Grand Prix events in both Saint-Vincent and Basel.

In 1990 he played doubles at the Lipton International Players Championships, one of the top tier tournaments now known as the Masters Series. His best performance in an ATP Tour tournament came at the 1990 Sanremo Open where he and partner Ola Jonsson were losing finalists. He made the main draw of the men's doubles at the 1990 US Open partnering Tobias Svantesson. They lost in the first round to Royce Deppe and Bret Garnett.

== ATP Tour career finals ==
=== Doubles: 1 (0–1) ===
Result	W/L	Date	Tournament	Surface	Partner	Opponents	Score
Loss	0–1	Aug 1990	Sanremo, Italy	Clay	(Sweden) Ola Jonsson	(Romania) Mihnea-Ion Năstase (Socialist Federal Republic of Yugoslavia) Goran Prpić	6–3, 6–7, 3–6

== Challenger titles ==
=== Doubles: (1) ===
No.	Year	Tournament	Surface	Partner	Opponents	Score
1.	1989	Pescara, Italy	Clay	(Sweden) David Engel	(Sweden) Nicklas Kulti (Sweden) Magnus Larsson	6–2, 4–6, 7–6
