= Dick Bosse =

South African tennis player

- Country (sports): South Africa
- Born: 1 August 1967 (age 58)
- Plays: Right-handed
- Prize money: $16,567

Singles
- Career record: 0-2
- Career titles: 0
- Highest ranking: No. 350 (20 Jul 1992)

Grand Slam singles results
- US Open: 1R (1990, 1992)

Doubles
- Highest ranking: No. 482 (10 September 1990)

Dick Bosse is a former professional tennis player from South Africa.

Bosse qualified for the US Open twice, in 1990 and 1992. He lost in the first round at both tournaments, to Glenn Layendecker in 1990 and to Gabriel Markus in 1992.
