= Sanremo Open =

San Remo Open

Defunct tennis tournament
- Tour: ATP Tour
- Founded: 1990
- Abolished: 1990
- Editions: 1
- Location: San Remo
- Surface: Clay / outdoor

The Sanremo Open is a defunct men's tennis tournament that was part of the World Series of the ATP Tour for one year in July/August 1990. The event was held in Sanremo, northern Italy, and was played on outdoor clay courts. It was the successor tournament to the historical San Remo International.

== Finals ==
=== Singles ===
Year	Champions	Runners-up	Score
1990	(Spain) Jordi Arrese	(Spain) Juan Aguilera	6–2, 6–2

=== Doubles ===
Year	Champions	Runners-up	Score
1990	(Romania) Mihnea-Ion Năstase (Socialist Federal Republic of Yugoslavia) Goran Prpić	(Sweden) Ola Jonsson (Sweden) Fredrik Nilsson	3–6, 7–6, 6–3
