= Roberto Azar =

Argentine tennis player

- Country (sports): Argentina
- Residence: Buenos Aires
- Born: 21 March 1966 (age 58); Lincoln, Argentina
- Height: 1.85 m (6 ft 1 in)
- Turned pro: 1984
- Plays: Left-handed
- Prize money: $441,303

Singles
- Career record: 48-90
- Career titles: 0
- Highest ranking: No. 81 (11 June 1990)

Grand Slam singles results
- French Open: 3R (1990)
- Wimbledon: 1R (1992, 1993)
- US Open: 1R (1990, 1991)

Roberto Azar (born 21 March 1966) is a former professional tennis player from Argentina.

== Career ==
Azar was runner-up at the San Marino Open in 1989. He also reached the semi-finals at the Bologna Outdoor tournament that season, beating world number 27 Ronald Agenor in the quarter-finals. He finished runner-up in the

In 1990 he made quarter-finals in Casablanca and then put together the best performance of his career up to that date by reaching the round of 16 in the ATP German Open, one of the tours most prestigious events. He defeated 11th seed and world number 18 Carl-Uwe Steeb in the second round. Another solid effort in Umag saw him make the quarter-finals and he entered the 1990 French Open as a qualifier, but had entered the top 100 for the first time. In what was his first ever Grand Slam, Azar defeated American Lawson Duncan and Czech Martin Střelba, before losing to Jonas Svensson in the third round. He also made the semi-finals of the Sanremo Open, later that year.

He was a quarter-finalist at Genoa and a semi-finalist at San Marino in 1991. The following year he won his only other Grand Slam match, the French Open against Henrik Holm. In 1993 made the quarter-finals at Atlanta.

== Grand Prix career finals ==
=== Singles: 1 (0–1) ===
| Result | W/L | Date | Tournament | Surface | Opponent | Score |
|---|---|---|---|---|---|---|
| Loss | 0–1 | Aug 1989 | San Marino, San Marino | Clay | (Spain) José Francisco Altur | 7–6, 4–6, 1–6 |

=== Doubles: 1 (0–1) ===
| Result | W/L | Date | Tournament | Surface | Partner | Opponents | Score |
|---|---|---|---|---|---|---|---|
| Loss | 0–1 | Apr 1987 | Bari, Italy | Clay | (Argentina) Marcelo Ingaramo | (Sweden) Christer Allgårdh (Sweden) Ulf Stenlund | 3–6, 3–6 |

== Challenger titles ==
=== Singles: (1) ===
| No. | Year | Tournament | Surface | Opponent | Score |
|---|---|---|---|---|---|
| 1. | 1992 | Reggio Calabria, Italy | Clay | (Spain) Alberto Berasategui | 6–4, 6–2 |
