= Stéphane Sansoni =

French tennis player

Stephane Sansoni
- Country (sports): France
- Residence: Nîmes
- Born: 12 August 1967 (age 57); Toulouse, France
- Height: 1.80 m (5 ft 11 in)
- Plays: Right-handed
- Prize money: $72,358

Singles
- Career record: 1–5
- Career titles: 0
- Highest ranking: No. 185 (14 September 1992)

Grand Slam singles results
- French Open: 1R (1993)

Doubles
- Career record: 0–1
- Career titles: 0
- Highest ranking: No. 304 (17 February 1992)

Grand Slam doubles results
- French Open: 1R (1994)

Stéphane Sansoni (born 12 August 1967) is a former professional tennis player from France.

Sansoni reached the second round of the 1992 Hard Court Championships, which were held in Indianapolis. After defeating Tom Mercer in the opening round, the Frenchman then met and was beaten by eventual champion Pete Sampras.

In the 1993 French Open, Sansoni lost in the first round, to Fernando Meligeni. The following year he returned to the French Open and took part in the men's doubles, with Lionel Barthez. They were defeated by Australians Joshua Eagle and Paul Kilderry in the first round.
