= Daniele Balducci =

Italian tennis player

- Full name: Daniele Balducci
- Country (sports): Italy
- Born: 10 September 1970 (age 54)
- Prize money: $58,225

Singles
- Career record: 1–3
- Highest ranking: No. 191 (29 April 1996)

Doubles
- Career record: 0–1
- Highest ranking: No. 426 (14 July 1997)

Daniele Balducci (born 10 September 1970) is a former professional tennis player from Italy.

== Biography ==
Originally from the Tuscan town of Monsummano Terme, Balducci had a highest ranking on tour of 191.

Balducci made his ATP Tour main draw debut at the 1990 Sanremo Open, where he featured in both the singles and doubles events. His other two ATP Tour appearances came at the Austrian Open Kitzbühel, as a qualifier for back to back tournaments in 1995 and 1996, making second round in the latter year by beating Olivier Delaître

He has a win over Roger Federer to his name, defeating the future world number one at a satellite tournament in Switzerland in 1997.
