= Goran Prpić =

Croatian tennis player and coach

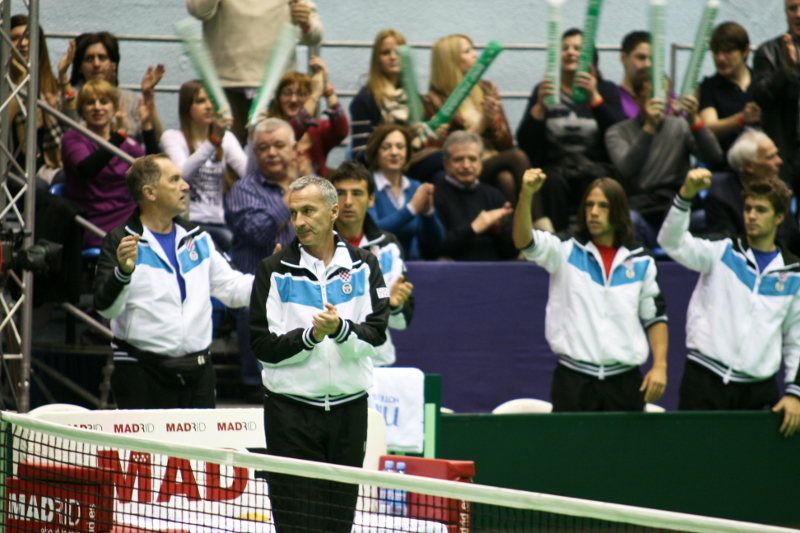
- Prpić in 2011
- Country (sports): Yugoslavia (1984–1991); Croatia (1992–1996)
- Residence: Zagreb, Croatia
- Born: 4 May 1964 (age 62) Zagreb, SR Croatia, SFR Yugoslavia
- Height: 1.80 m (5 ft 11 in)
- Turned pro: 1984
- Retired: 1996
- Plays: Right-handed (one-handed backhand)
- Prize money: $1,303,639

Singles
- Career record: 125–121
- Career titles: 1; 2 Challenger, 0 Futures
- Highest ranking: No. 16 (29 July 1991)

Grand Slam singles results
- Australian Open: QF (1991)
- French Open: QF (1993)
- Wimbledon: 2R (1991)
- US Open: 2R (1991)

Other tournaments
- Grand Slam Cup: 1R (1991)
- Olympic Games: 2R (1992)

Doubles
- Career record: 53–61
- Career titles: 1; 1 Challenger, 1 Futures
- Highest ranking: No. 75 (29 July 1991)

Grand Slam doubles results
- Australian Open: 3R (1992)
- French Open: 2R (1991)
- Wimbledon: 2R (1991)

Other doubles tournaments
- Olympic Games: SF (1992)

Team competitions
- Davis Cup: SF (1988, 1989)
- Hopman Cup: W (1991)
Medal record
Men's tennis
Bronze medal – third place	1992 Barcelona	Doubles
- Last updated on: 26 February 2023.

Goran Prpić (Croatian: [ɡǒran pr̩̂pitɕ]; born 4 May 1964) is a Croatian tennis coach and former professional tennis player, who played for SFR Yugoslavia and Croatia.

== Biography ==
Prpić was born in Zagreb, at the time in SR Croatia, SFR Yugoslavia. He turned professional in 1984. His career was nearly ended by a serious knee injury in February 1986. After a surgery, Prpić spent two years recovering before returning to the Tour. For the rest of his playing career, he wore a custom-made knee brace.

During his career, he won one top-level singles title (at Umag in 1990) and one doubles title (San Remo in 1990). His joint best performance at a Grand Slam tournament was at the 1991 Australian Open, where he reached the quarter-finals. He also reached the quarter-finals of the 1993 French Open. His career-high singles ranking was World No. 16 in 1991.

In 1990, Prpić was a member of the team from Yugoslavia which won the World Team Cup. In 1991, he teamed-up with Monica Seles to help Yugoslavia win the Hopman Cup. A year later in 1992, Prpić teamed-up with Goran Ivanišević to win the men's doubles bronze medal at the Olympic Games in Barcelona for the newly independent nation of Croatia.

Prpić retired from the professional tour in 1996.

In 2000, he became the coach of the Croatian women's national tennis team, and in 2006, he also took over coaching of the men's national tennis team. He resigned from both positions in November 2011.

== ATP Career Finals ==
=== Singles: 3 (1 title, 2 runner-ups) ===
Legend Grand Slam Tournaments (0–0) ATP World Tour Finals (0–0) ATP Masters Series (0–0) ATP Championship Series (0–0) ATP World Series (1–2)	Finals by surface Hard (0–0) Clay (1–2) Grass (0–0) Carpet (0–0)	Finals by setting Outdoors (1–2) Indoors (0–0)

Result	W–L	Date	Tournament	Tier	Surface	Opponent	Score
Loss	0–1	Jul 1989	Stuttgart, Germany	Grand Prix	Clay	(Argentina) Martín Jaite	3–6, 2–6
Win	1–1	May 1990	Umag, Yugoslavia	World Series	Clay	(Socialist Federal Republic of Yugoslavia) Goran Ivanišević	6–3, 4–6, 6–4
Loss	1–2	Apr 1991	Nice, France	World Series	Clay	(Argentina) Martín Jaite	6–3, 6–7^{(1–7)}, 3–6

=== Doubles: 2 (1 title, 1 runner-up) ===
Legend Grand Slam Tournaments (0–0) ATP World Tour Finals (0–0) ATP Masters Series (0–0) ATP Championship Series (0–0) ATP World Series (1–1)	Finals by surface Hard (0–0) Clay (1–1) Grass (0–0) Carpet (0–0)	Finals by setting Outdoors (1–1) Indoors (0–0)

Result	W–L	Date	Tournament	Tier	Surface	Partner	Opponents	Score
Win	1–0	Aug 1990	San Remo, Italy	World Series	Clay	(Romania) Mihnea Nastase	(Sweden) Ola Jonsson (Sweden) Fredrik Nilsson	3–6, 7–5, 6–3
Loss	1–1	Mar 1993	Casablanca, Morocco	World Series	Clay	(Latvia) Ģirts Dzelde	(United States) Mike Bauer (South Africa) Pieter Norval	5–7, 6–7

== ATP Challenger and ITF Futures finals ==
=== Singles: 3 (2–1) ===
Legend ATP Challenger (2–1) ITF Futures (0–0)	Finals by surface Hard (0–0) Clay (2–0) Grass (0–0) Carpet (0–1)

Result	W–L	Date	Tournament	Tier	Surface	Opponent	Score
Win	1–0	Mar 1989	Agadir, Morocco	Challenger	Clay	(Netherlands) Mark Koevermans	6–3, 6–3
Loss	1–1	Apr 1989	Graz, Austria	Challenger	Carpet	(Germany) Eric Jelen	6–4, 0–6, 4–6
Win	2–1	May 1989	Salzburg, Austria	Challenger	Clay	(France) Éric Winogradsky	6–1, 6–2

=== Doubles: 4 (2–2) ===
Legend ATP Challenger (1–2) ITF Futures (1–0)	Finals by surface Hard (0–0) Clay (2–1) Grass (0–0) Carpet (0–1)

Result	W–L	Date	Tournament	Tier	Surface	Partner	Opponents	Score
Loss	0–1	Feb 1989	Vienna, Austria	Challenger	Carpet	(Latvia) Ģirts Dzelde	(Sweden) Peter Nyborg (Sweden) Nicklas Utgren	4–6, 4–6
Win	1–1	Mar 1993	Agadir, Morocco	Challenger	Clay	(Netherlands) Menno Oosting	(Latvia) Ģirts Dzelde (South Africa) Pieter Norval	3–6, 6–3, 6–3
Loss	1–2	May 1993	Ljubljana, Slovenia	Challenger	Clay	(Netherlands) Hendrik-Jan Davids	(Slovakia) Branislav Stankovič (Czech Republic) Richard Vogel	4–6, 6–7
Win	2–2	Jul 1998	Croatia F3, Mali Lošinj	Futures	Clay	(Croatia) Kresimir Ritz	(Croatia) Bora Celiscak (Germany) Valentino Pest	6–0, 6–2

== Performance timelines ==
Key
W	F	SF	QF	#R	RR	Q#	DNQ	A	NH

(W) winner; (F) finalist; (SF) semifinalist; (QF) quarterfinalist; (#R) rounds 4, 3, 2, 1; (RR) round-robin stage; (Q#) qualification round; (DNQ) did not qualify; (A) absent; (NH) not held; (SR) strike rate (events won / competed); (W–L) win–loss record.

=== Singles ===
Tournament	1985	1986	1987	1988	1989	1990	1991	1992	1993	SR	W–L	Win %
Grand Slam tournaments
Australian Open	A	A	A	A	A	1R	QF	2R	A	0 / 3	5–3	63%
French Open	1R	A	A	A	2R	1R	2R	3R	QF	0 / 6	8–6	57%
Wimbledon	A	A	A	A	A	A	2R	A	A	0 / 1	1–1	50%
US Open	A	A	A	A	A	A	2R	A	1R	0 / 2	1–2	33%
Win–loss	0–1	0–0	0–0	0–0	1–1	0–2	7–4	3–2	4–2	0 / 12	15–12	56%
National Representation
Summer Olympics	NH			A	Not Held			2R	NH	0 / 1	1–1	50%
ATP Masters Series
Indian Wells	A	A	A	A	A	A	2R	A	A	0 / 1	1–1	50%
Miami	A	1R	A	A	A	A	3R	3R	A	0 / 3	2–3	40%
Monte Carlo	A	A	A	A	A	1R	SF	SF	1R	0 / 4	8–4	67%
Hamburg	A	A	A	A	A	2R	SF	1R	A	0 / 3	5–3	63%
Rome	A	A	A	A	A	A	SF	3R	A	0 / 2	6–2	75%
Paris	A	A	A	A	A	A	2R	A	A	0 / 1	0–1	0%
Win–loss	0–0	0–1	0–0	0–0	0–0	1–2	14–6	7–4	0–1	0 / 14	22–14	61%

=== Doubles ===
Tournament	1990	1991	1992	1993	SR	W–L	Win %
Grand Slam tournaments
Australian Open	1R	1R	3R	A	0 / 3	2–3	40%
French Open	A	2R	1R	A	0 / 2	1–2	33%
Wimbledon	A	2R	A	A	0 / 1	1–1	50%
US Open	A	A	A	A	0 / 0	0–0	–
Win–loss	0–1	2–3	0–1	2–1	0 / 6	4–6	40%
National Representation
Summer Olympics	Not Held		SF	NH	0 / 1	3–1	75%
ATP Masters Series
Miami	A	A	1R	A	0 / 1	0–1	0%
Monte Carlo	A	QF	2R	1R	0 / 3	3–3	50%
Hamburg	A	2R	SF	A	0 / 2	4–2	67%
Rome	A	2R	A	A	0 / 1	1–1	50%
Win–loss	0–0	4–3	4–3	0–1	0 / 7	8–7	53%

Awards and achievements
Preceded by (United States) Butch Walts	ATP Comeback Player of the Year; 1989	Succeeded by (Austria) Thomas Muster
