= Ola Jonsson =

Swedish tennis player

- Country (sports): Sweden
- Born: 3 November 1966 (age 59) Stockholm, Sweden
- Height: 1.78 m (5 ft 10 in)
- Turned pro: 1989
- Plays: Right-handed
- Prize money: $125,947

Singles
- Career record: 0–2
- Career titles: 0
- Highest ranking: No. 341 (11 February 1991)

Doubles
- Career record: 32–54
- Career titles: 2
- Highest ranking: No. 90 (4 November 1991)

Grand Slam doubles results
- Australian Open: 1R (1993)
- French Open: 2R (1991)
- Wimbledon: 1R (1992, 1993)
- US Open: 1R (1991, 1993)

Ola Jonsson (born 3 November 1966) is a former professional tennis player from Sweden. He enjoyed most of his tennis success while playing doubles. During his career, he won two doubles titles and finished runner-up an additional two times. He achieved a career-high doubles ranking of world No. 90 in 1991.

== Career finals ==
=== Doubles (2 wins, 2 losses) ===
Result	W/L	Date	Tournament	Surface	Partner	Opponents	Score
Loss	0–1	Aug 1990	San Remo, Italy	Clay	(Sweden) Fredrik Nilsson	(Romania) Mihnea-Ion Năstase (Socialist Federal Republic of Yugoslavia) Goran Prpić	6–3, 6–7, 3–6
Win	1–1	Jun 1991	Florence, Italy	Clay	(Sweden) Magnus Larsson	(Spain) Juan Carlos Báguena (Spain) Carlos Costa	3–6, 6–1, 6–1
Loss	1–2	Sep 1991	Geneva, Switzerland	Clay	(Sweden) Per Henricsson	(Spain) Sergi Bruguera (Switzerland) Marc Rosset	6–3, 3–6, 2–6
Win	2–2	Sep 1992	Palermo, Italy	Clay	(Sweden) Johan Donar	(Argentina) Horacio de la Peña (Czech Republic) Vojtěch Flégl	5–7, 6–3, 6–4
