= Mihnea-Ion Năstase =

Romanian tennis player

- Country (sports): Romania
- Residence: Oldsmar, Florida
- Born: February 7, 1967 (age 58); Bucharest, Romania
- Height: 6 ft (183 cm)
- Plays: Right-handed
- Prize money: $54,828

Singles
- Career record: 0–3
- Career titles: 0
- Highest ranking: No. 279 (13 Jul 1992)

Doubles
- Career record: 10–11
- Career titles: 1
- Highest ranking: No. 159 (10 Jun 1991)

Grand Slam doubles results
- Wimbledon: 1R (1989)

Mihnea-Ion Năstase (born 7 February 1967) is a former professional tennis player from Romania. He is a nephew of two-time Grand Slam winner Ilie Năstase and his father, Constantin Năstase, was a Romanian Davis Cup representative.

== Career ==
Năstase was born in Bucharest but grew up in Italy and went to college in the United States, where he played tennis for Mississippi State University.

Partnering Leonardo Lavalle, Năstase was a winner in the boys' doubles event at the 1984 US Open. It was his second Grand Slam final, having finished runner-up to Mark Kratzmann and Simon Youl in the 1983 Wimbledon Championships, with Olli Rahnasto.

In 1984, Năstase became the third member of his family to play for the Romanian Davis Cup team. With Andrei Dîrzu, he took part in Romania's doubles rubber against West Germany in their World Group Relegation Play-off. The West Germans won the match and the tie. Năstase never appeared in the Davis Cup again.

The Romanian was primarily a doubles player and it was in the men's doubles that he made his only senior Grand Slam appearance. It was in the 1989 Wimbledon Championships, where he and Lan Bale lost in the opening round to Javier Frana and his former junior partner Leonardo Lavalle.

He was a semi-finalist with Borja Uribe at Florence in 1989 but his best performance came in the 1990 Sanremo Open, which he and Goran Prpic won.

== ATP career finals ==
=== Doubles: 1 (1–0) ===
Result	W/L	Date	Tournament	Surface	Partner	Opponents	Score
Win	1–0	Aug 1990	Sanremo, Italy	Clay	(Socialist Federal Republic of Yugoslavia) Goran Prpić	(Sweden) Ola Jonsson (Sweden) Fredrik Nilsson	3–6, 7–6, 6–3

== Challenger titles ==
=== Doubles: (3) ===
No.	Year	Tournament	Surface	Partner	Opponents	Score
1.	1989	Jakarta, Indonesia	Hard	(United States) Brian Page	(Australia) Neil Borwick (Australia) Steve Furlong	3–6, 6–3, 7–6
2.	1989	Nicosia, Cyprus	Clay	(India) Srinivasan Vasudevan	(United Kingdom) Sean Cole (United Kingdom) Nick Fulwood	6–3, 6–7, 6–1
3.	1991	Bangalore, India	Clay	(Georgia (country)) Vladimir Gabrichidze	(United Kingdom) Sean Cole (Germany) Martin Zumpft	2–6, 7–5, 6–3
