= Juan Aguilera (tennis) =

Spanish tennis player (1962–2025)

- Country (sports): Spain
- Residence: Barcelona, Spain
- Born: 22 March 1962 Barcelona, Spain
- Died: 25 March 2025 (aged 63) Barcelona, Spain
- Height: 1.82 m (5 ft 11 1/2 in)
- Turned pro: 1980
- Retired: 1 October 1991
- Plays: Right-handed (one-handed backhand)
- Prize money: $825,000

Singles
- Career record: 146–140 (51.0%)
- Career titles: 5
- Highest ranking: No. 7 (17 September 1984)

Grand Slam singles results
- French Open: 4R (1984)
- Wimbledon: 3R (1990)
- US Open: 2R (1984)

Doubles
- Career record: 8–36 (18.2%)
- Career titles: 0
- Highest ranking: No. 228 (20 August 1984)

Juan Aguilera Herrera (Spanish pronunciation: [ˈxwan aɣiˈleɾa eˈreɾa]; 22 March 1962 – 25 March 2025) was a Spanish professional tennis player.

== Biography ==
Aguilera was born in Barcelona, Spain on 22 March 1962. He won five singles titles during his career, including one Grand Prix Championship Series title and one Tennis Masters shield, the Hamburg Masters in 1984 and 1990, defeating Boris Becker in the final of the latter in straight sets. His career-high singles ranking was world No. 7, achieved in September 1984. Aguilera died in Barcelona on 25 March 2025, at the age of 63.

== Career finals ==
=== Singles (5 titles, 4 runner-ups) ===
Legend (singles)
Grand Slam (0)
Tennis Masters Cup (0)
ATP Masters Series (1)
ATP Tour (4)

Result	W-L	Date	Tournament	Surface	Opponent	Score
Loss	0–1	Sep 1983	Bordeaux, France	Clay	(Peru) Pablo Arraya	5–7, 5–7
Win	1–1	Apr 1984	Aix en Provence, France	Clay	(Spain) Fernando Luna	6–4, 7–5
Win	2–1	May 1984	Hamburg, West Germany	Clay	(Sweden) Henrik Sundström	6–4, 2–6, 2–6, 6–4, 6–4
Win	3–1	Jun 1989	Bari, Italy	Clay	(Czechoslovakia) Marián Vajda	4–6, 6–3, 6–4
Loss	3–2	Aug 1989	St. Vincent, Italy	Clay	(Argentina) Franco Davín	2–6, 2–6
Win	4–2	Apr 1990	Nice, France	Clay	(France) Guy Forget	2–6, 6–3, 6–4
Win	5–2	May 1990	Hamburg, West Germany	Clay	(West Germany) Boris Becker	6–1, 6–0, 7–6^{(9–7)}
Loss	5–3	Jul 1990	San Remo, Italy	Clay	(Spain) Jordi Arrese	2–6, 2–6
Loss	5–4	Sep 1990	Palermo, Italy	Clay	(Argentina) Franco Davín	1–6, 1–6
