= 1992 ATP German Open – Doubles =

Doubles
- 1992 ATP German Open

Final
- Champions: (Spain) Sergio Casal (Spain) Emilio Sánchez
- Runners-up: (Germany) Carl-Uwe Steeb (Germany) Michael Stich
- Score: 5–7, 6–4, 6–3

Events
Singles	Doubles
← 1991 ·	Hamburg European Open	· 1993 →

Sergio Casal and Emilio Sánchez successfully defended their title by defeating Carl-Uwe Steeb and Michael Stich in the final, 5–7, 6–4, 6–3.

== Seeds ==
The first four seeds received a bye into the second round.

1. (United States) Scott Davis / (United States) David Pate (second round)
2. (United States) Kelly Jones / (United States) Rick Leach (second round)
3. (Netherlands) Tom Nijssen / (Czechoslovakia) Cyril Suk (semifinals)
4. (United States) Luke Jensen / (Australia) Laurie Warder (quarterfinals)
5. (Spain) Sergio Casal / (Spain) Emilio Sánchez (champions)
6. (Italy) Omar Camporese / (Croatia) Goran Ivanišević (first round)
7. (Czechoslovakia) Petr Korda / (United States) Jim Pugh (second round)
8. (Netherlands) Paul Haarhuis / (Netherlands) Mark Koevermans (first round)

== Draw ==
=== Key ===
- Q = Qualifier
- WC = Wild card
- LL = Lucky loser
- Alt = Alternate
- SE = Special exempt
- PR = Protected ranking
- ITF = ITF entry
- JE = Junior exempt
- w/o = Walkover
- r = Retired
- d = Defaulted
- SR = Special ranking

=== Finals ===
Semifinals
Q	(Commonwealth of Independent States) Dimitri Poliakov (Croatia) Goran Prpić	4	2
5	(Spain) Sergio Casal (Spain) Emilio Sánchez	6	6
3	(Netherlands) Tom Nijssen (Czech Republic) Cyril Suk	2	6
(Germany) Carl-Uwe Steeb (Germany) Michael Stich	6	7

Final
5	(Spain) Sergio Casal (Spain) Emilio Sánchez	5	6	6
(Germany) Carl-Uwe Steeb (Germany) Michael Stich	7	4	3

=== Top half ===
First round
(Netherlands) R Krajicek (Netherlands) J Siemerink	7	4	3
WC	(Germany) L Koslowski (Germany) M Naewie	5	6	6
Q	(Germany) D Dier (Germany) T Theine	7	3	4
Q	(Commonwealth of Independent States) D Poliakov (Croatia) G Prpić	6	6	6
(South Africa) P Aldrich (South Africa) D Visser	5	6	6
8	(Netherlands) P Haarhuis (Netherlands) M Koevermans	7	4	4
(United States) G Layendecker (Netherlands) M Schapers	6	6
(South Africa) D Adams (Netherlands) M Oosting	7	7
(Czechoslovakia) I Lendl (Czechoslovakia) K Nováček	6	1	6
(Finland) O Rahnasto (Sweden) T Svantesson	3	6	4
(Italy) D Nargiso (Germany) R Riglewski	2	4
5	(Spain) S Casal (Spain) E Sánchez	6	6

Second round
1	(United States) S Davis (United States) D Pate	4	2
WC	(Germany) L Koslowski (Germany) M Naewie	6	6
Q	(Commonwealth of Independent States) D Poliakov (Croatia) G Prpić	6	6
(South Africa) P Aldrich (South Africa) D Visser	4	4
4	(United States) L Jensen (Australia) L Warder	7	6
(South Africa) D Adams (Netherlands) M Oosting	6	4
(Czechoslovakia) I Lendl (Czechoslovakia) K Nováček	2	4
5	(Spain) S Casal (Spain) E Sánchez	6	6

Quarterfinals
WC	(Germany) L Koslowski (Germany) M Naewie	3	7	2
Q	(Commonwealth of Independent States) D Poliakov (Croatia) G Prpić	6	6	6
4	(United States) L Jensen (Australia) L Warder	5	2
5	(Spain) S Casal (Spain) E Sánchez	7	6

Semifinals
Q	(Commonwealth of Independent States) D Poliakov (Croatia) G Prpić	4	2
5	(Spain) S Casal (Spain) E Sánchez	6	6

=== Bottom half ===
First round
6	(Italy) O Camporese (Croatia) G Ivanišević	3	6	5
(United States) P Galbraith (United States) S Melville	6	3	7
WC	(Sweden) S Edberg (Sweden) J Svensson	7	4	4
WC	(Germany) A Thoms (Germany) M Zoecke	5	6	6
(Georgia (country)) Ģ Dzelde (Czechoslovakia) V Flégl	7	2	5
WC	(Germany) MK Goellner (Germany) D Prinosil	5	6	7
7	(Czechoslovakia) P Korda (United States) J Pugh	7	6
(Argentina) C Miniussi (Uruguay) D Pérez	5	2
(Ecuador) A Gómez (Spain) J Sánchez	3	6	5
(Germany) CU Steeb (Germany) M Stich	6	3	7
(Mexico) J Lozano (Brazil) C Motta	1	6	6
(Sweden) R Båthman (Sweden) R Bergh	6	4	3

Second round
(United States) P Galbraith (United States) S Melville	7	6
WC	(Germany) A Thoms (Germany) M Zoecke	6	1
WC	(Germany) MK Goellner (Germany) D Prinosil	2	3
3	(Netherlands) T Nijssen (Czechoslovakia) C Suk	6	6
7	(Czechoslovakia) P Korda (United States) J Pugh	5	6
(Germany) CU Steeb (Germany) M Stich	7	7
(Mexico) J Lozano (Brazil) C Motta	6	6
2	(United States) K Jones (United States) R Leach	4	3

Quarterfinals
(United States) P Galbraith (United States) S Melville	3	6	4
3	(Netherlands) T Nijssen (Czechoslovakia) C Suk	6	3	6
(Germany) CU Steeb (Germany) M Stich	6	4	7
(Mexico) J Lozano (Brazil) C Motta	2	6	6

Semifinals
3	(Netherlands) T Nijssen (Czechoslovakia) C Suk	2	6
(Germany) CU Steeb (Germany) M Stich	6	7
