= 1993 ATP German Open – Doubles =

Doubles
- 1993 ATP German Open

Final
- Champions: (Netherlands) Paul Haarhuis; (Netherlands) Mark Koevermans
- Runners-up: (Canada) Grant Connell; (United States) Patrick Galbraith
- Score: 6–4, 6–7, 7–6

Details
- Draw: 28 (3WC/2Q)
- Seeds: 8

Events
Singles	Doubles
- Hamburg European Open

Sergio Casal and Emilio Sánchez were the two-time defending champions, but lost to Paul Haarhuis and Mark Koevermans in the semifinals.

Haarhuis and Koevermans went on to win the title, defeating Grant Connell and Patrick Galbraith in the finals, 6–4, 6–7, 7–6.

== Seeds ==
The first four seeds received a bye into the second round.

1. (Australia) John Fitzgerald / (Sweden) Anders Järryd (quarterfinals)
2. (South Africa) David Adams / (Russia) Andrei Olhovskiy (second round)
3. (United States) Steve DeVries / (Australia) David Macpherson (quarterfinals)
4. (Czech Republic) Cyril Suk / (Australia) Laurie Warder (second round)
5. (Canada) Grant Connell / (United States) Patrick Galbraith (finals)
6. (Spain) Sergio Casal / (Spain) Emilio Sánchez (semifinals)
7. (Netherlands) Paul Haarhuis / (Netherlands) Mark Koevermans (champions)
8. (South Africa) Wayne Ferreira / (Australia) Mark Kratzmann (first round)

== Draw ==
Key

- Q = Qualifier
- WC = Wild card
- LL = Lucky loser
- Alt = Alternate
- ITF = ITF entry
- PR = Protected ranking
- SR = Special ranking
- SE = Special exempt
- JE = Junior exempt
- JR = Junior Accelerator Programme entrant
- CO = College Accelerator Programme entrant
- NG = Next Gen Accelerator Program entrant
- w/o = Walkover
- r = Retired
- d = Defaulted

=== Finals ===
Semifinals

Final

7
- (Netherlands) Paul Haarhuis
- (Netherlands) Mark Koevermans
6
7

6/WC
- (Spain) Sergio Casal
- (Spain) Emilio Sánchez
3
5

7
- (Netherlands) Paul Haarhuis
- (Netherlands) Mark Koevermans
6
6
7

5
- (Canada) Grant Connell
- (United States) Patrick Galbraith
4
7
6

5
- (Canada) Grant Connell
- (United States) Patrick Galbraith
2
6
6

- (Netherlands) Richard Krajicek
- (Netherlands) Menno Oosting
6
3
4

=== Top half ===
First round

Second round

Quarterfinals

Semifinals

1
- (Australia) J Fitzgerald
- (Sweden) A Järryd
3
6
6

- (Germany) U Riglewski
- (Germany) M Stich
7
7

- (Germany) U Riglewski
- (Germany) M Stich
6
2
4

- (Germany) P Kühnen
- (Brazil) C Motta
5
5

1
- (Australia) J Fitzgerald
- (Sweden) A Järryd
7
4
3

Q
- (Argentina) H de la Peña
- (Mexico) J Lozano
1
6
6

7
- (Netherlands) Paul Haarhuis
- (Netherlands) Mark Koevermans
5
6
6

- (Czech Republic) K Nováček
- (Germany) C-U Steeb
6
4
4

Q
- (Argentina) H de la Peña
- (Mexico) J Lozano
1
3

- (Switzerland) M Rosset
- (Spain) J Sánchez

7
- (Netherlands) Paul Haarhuis
- (Netherlands) Mark Koevermans
6
6

7
- (Netherlands) P Haarhuis
- (Netherlands) M Koevermans
w/o

7
- (Netherlands) Paul Haarhuis
- (Netherlands) Mark Koevermans
6
7

6/WC
- (Spain) S Casal
- (Spain) E Sánchez
3
5

3
- (United States) S DeVries
- (Australia) D Macpherson
7
6

- (Netherlands) T Nijssen
- (Spain) F Roig
1
7
4

- (United States) B Garnett
- (Italy) D Nargiso
6
2

- (United States) B Garnett
- (Italy) D Nargiso
6
5
6

3
- (United States) S DeVries
- (Australia) D Macpherson
6
4

- (United States) J Pugh
- (United States) G Van Emburgh
6
6

6/WC
- (Spain) S Casal
- (Spain) E Sánchez
7
6

WC
- (Germany) J Renzenbrink
- (Germany) A Thoms
3
1

- (United States) J Pugh
- (United States) G Van Emburgh
1
4

- (Germany) B Karbacher
- (Germany) M Naewie
2
2

6/WC
- (Spain) S Casal
- (Spain) E Sánchez
6
6

6/WC
- (Spain) S Casal
- (Spain) E Sánchez
6
6

=== Bottom half ===
First round

Second round

Quarterfinals

Semifinals

5
- (Canada) G Connell
- (United States) P Galbraith
6
6

- (United States) M Bauer
- (Belgium) L Pimek
4
4

5
- (Canada) G Connell
- (United States) P Galbraith
6
7

- (Sweden) R Båthman
- (United States) S Melville
2
6

- (Germany) D Dier
- (Germany) L Koslowski
2
6

- (Germany) D Dier
- (Germany) L Koslowski
6
7

5
- (Canada) G Connell
- (United States) P Galbraith
7
6

- (United States) L Jensen
- (United States) M Jensen
6
4
4

Q
- (Brazil) L Mattar
- (Brazil) J Oncins
6
4

Q
- (Brazil) L Mattar
- (Brazil) J Oncins
3
6
6

Q
- (Brazil) L Mattar
- (Brazil) J Oncins
6
6
6

4
- (Czech Republic) C Suk
- (Australia) L Warder
3
7
4

5
- (Canada) G Connell
- (United States) P Galbraith
2
6
6

8
- (South Africa) W Ferreira
- (Australia) M Kratzmann
6
6
2

- (Netherlands) R Krajicek
- (Netherlands) M Oosting
6
3
4

WC
- (Germany) M-K Goellner
- (Germany) D Prinosil
4
7
6

WC
- (Germany) M-K Goellner
- (Germany) D Prinosil
6
3
7

- (Sweden) J Donar
- (Czech Republic) V Flégl
3
2

- (Sweden) R Bergh
- (South Africa) B Talbot
4
6
6

- (Sweden) R Bergh
- (South Africa) B Talbot
6
6

WC
- (Germany) M-K Goellner
- (Germany) D Prinosil
3
3

- (Netherlands) R Krajicek
- (Netherlands) M Oosting
6
1
6

- (Netherlands) R Krajicek
- (Netherlands) M Oosting
6
6

- (South Africa) B Haygarth
- (South Africa) P Norval
2
6
2

- (Netherlands) R Krajicek
- (Netherlands) M Oosting
6
5
7

2
- (South Africa) D Adams
- (Russia) A Olhovskiy
4
7
6
