= 1996 Panasonic German Open =

- Date: 6–12 May
- Edition: 90th
- Category: Super 9
- Draw: 56S / 28D
- Prize money: $1,950,000
- Surface: Clay / outdoor
- Location: Hamburg, Germany
- Venue: Rothenbaum Tennis Center

Champions

Singles
- (Spain) Roberto Carretero

Doubles
- (The Bahamas) Mark Knowles / (Canada) Daniel Nestor
| ← 1995 · | German Open Tennis Championships | · 1997 → |

The 1996 Panasonic German Open was a tennis tournament played on outdoor clay courts. It was the 90th edition of the Hamburg Masters and was part of the Mercedes Super 9 of the 1996 ATP Tour. It took place at the Am Rothenbaum in Hamburg, Germany from 6 May through 12 May 1996.

The singles field was headlined by ATP No. 5, 1995 Tour Championships winner, Australian Open and 1991 Hamburg runner-up Boris Becker, Zagreb, Dubai, Milan, Rotterdam and Grand Slam Cup champion Goran Ivanišević and Adelaide winner and Rotterdam and St. Petersburg finalist Yevgeny Kafelnikov. Other top seeds competing were Indian Wells winner Wayne Ferreira, Monte Carlo and Indian Wells semifinalist Marcelo Ríos, Sergi Bruguera, Arnaud Boetsch and Marc Rosset.

== Finals ==
=== Singles ===
(Spain) Roberto Carretero defeated (Spain) Àlex Corretja 2–6, 6–4, 6–4, 6–4

- It was Carretero's 1st title of the year and the 1st of his career. It was his 1st Masters title of the year and his 1st overall.

=== Doubles ===
(The Bahamas) Mark Knowles / (Canada) Daniel Nestor defeated (France) Guy Forget / (Switzerland) Jakob Hlasek 6–2, 6–4

- It was Knowles' 4th title of the year and the 8th of his career. It was Nestor's 3rd title of the year and the 5th of his career.
