= 1997 ATP German Open =

- Date: 5–12 May
- Edition: 91st
- Category: ATP Super 9
- Draw: 56S / 28D
- Prize money: $2,050,000
- Surface: Clay / outdoor
- Location: Hamburg, Germany
- Venue: Rothenbaum Tennis Center

Champions

Singles
- (Ukraine) Andrei Medvedev

Doubles
- (Argentina) Luis Lobo / (Spain) Javier Sánchez
- Hamburg Open

The 1997 German Open was a tennis tournament played on outdoor clay courts. It was the 91st edition of the Hamburg Masters (German Open), and was part of the ATP Super 9 of the 1997 ATP Tour. It took place at the Rothenbaum Tennis Center in Hamburg, Germany, from through 5 May through 12 May 1997.

The singles field was headlined by ATP No. 3, Dubai, Miami Masters, titlist, Australian Open semi-finalist Thomas Muster, 1996 French Open runner-up, 1994 German Open finalist, Prague, Lyon winner Yevgeny Kafelnikov and Tokyo champion, Monte Carlo quarter-finalist and Wimbledon defending champion Richard Krajicek. Other top seeds competing were Australian Open finalist Carlos Moyá, Monte Carlo winner Marcelo Ríos, Wayne Ferreira, Albert Costa and Boris Becker.

== Finals ==
=== Singles ===
(Ukraine) Andrei Medvedev defeated (Spain) Félix Mantilla 6–0, 6–4, 6–2

- It was Andrei Medvedev's 1st title of the year, and his 11th overall. It was his 1st Masters title of the year, and his 4th overall. It was also his 3rd victory at the event after 1994 and 1995.

=== Doubles ===
(Argentina) Luis Lobo / (Spain) Javier Sánchez defeated (United Kingdom) Neil Broad / (South Africa) Piet Norval 6–3, 7–6
