= 1994 ATP German Open – Doubles =

Doubles
- 1994 ATP German Open

Final
- Champions: (United States) Scott Melville (South Africa) Piet Norval
- Runners-up: (Sweden) Henrik Holm (Sweden) Anders Järryd
- Score: 7–6, 6–3

Events
| Singles | Doubles |
| ← 1993 · | Hamburg European Open | · 1995 → |

Paul Haarhuis and Mark Koevermans were the defending champions, but competed this year with different partners. Haarhuis teamed up with Jacco Eltingh and lost in the semifinals to Henrik Holm and Anders Järryd, while Koevermans teamed up with Jan Apell and lost in the first round to Javier Sánchez and Daniel Vacek.

Scott Melville and Piet Norval won the title by defeating Henrik Holm and Anders Järryd 7–6, 6–3 in the final.

== Seeds ==
The first four seeds received a bye to the second round.

1. (Canada) Grant Connell / (United States) Patrick Galbraith (second round)
2. (Netherlands) Jacco Eltingh / (Netherlands) Paul Haarhuis (semifinals)
3. (Netherlands) Tom Nijssen / (Czech Republic) Cyril Suk (quarterfinals)
4. (South Africa) David Adams / (Russia) Andrei Olhovskiy (quarterfinals)
5. (Sweden) Henrik Holm / (Sweden) Anders Järryd (final)
6. (South Africa) Gary Muller / (South Africa) Danie Visser (first round)
7. (Spain) Sergio Casal / (Spain) Emilio Sánchez (second round)
8. (Spain) Javier Sánchez / (Czech Republic) Daniel Vacek (second round)

== Draw ==
=== Key ===
- Q = Qualifier
- WC = Wild card
- LL = Lucky loser
- Alt = Alternate
- SE = Special exempt
- PR = Protected ranking
- ITF = ITF entry
- JE = Junior exempt
- w/o = Walkover
- r = Retired
- d = Defaulted
- SR = Special ranking

=== Finals ===
Semifinals
(Germany) Marc-Kevin Goellner (Italy) Diego Nargiso | 6 | 2 | 3
(United States) Scott Melville (South Africa) Piet Norval | 2 | 6 | 6
5 | (Sweden) Henrik Holm (Sweden) Anders Järryd | 6 | 7
2 | (Netherlands) Jacco Eltingh (Netherlands) Paul Haarhuis | 4 | 6

Final
(United States) Scott Melville (South Africa) Piet Norval | 6 | 6
5 | (Sweden) Henrik Holm (Sweden) Anders Järryd | 3 | 4

=== Top half ===
First round
WC | (Czech Republic) K Nováček (Germany) CU Steeb | 6 | 3 | 5
Q | (Sweden) N Kulti (Sweden) M Larsson | 3 | 6 | 7
(Netherlands) R Krajicek (Netherlands) M Oosting | 4 | 4
(Germany) MK Goellner (Italy) D Nargiso | 6 | 6
(United States) F Montana (United States) J Pugh | 1 | 6 | 5
7 | (Spain) S Casal (Spain) E Sánchez | 6 | 3 | 7
WC | (Croatia) G Ivanišević (Switzerland) M Rosset | 3 | 6 | 6
(Italy) C Brandi (Italy) F Mordegan | 6 | 3 | 4
(United States) S Cannon (Australia) D Macpherson | 3 | 5
(United States) S Melville (South Africa) P Norval | 6 | 7
(United States) M Bauer (South Africa) B Talbot | 6 | 6 | 6
6 | (South Africa) G Muller (South Africa) D Visser | 7 | 4 | 4

Second round
1 | (Canada) G Connell (United States) P Galbraith | 2 | 3
Q | (Sweden) N Kulti (Sweden) M Larsson | 6 | 6
(Germany) MK Goellner (Italy) D Nargiso | 6 | 6
7 | (Spain) S Casal (Spain) E Sánchez | 4 | 4
3 | (Netherlands) T Nijssen (Czech Republic) C Suk | 6 | 7
WC | (Croatia) G Ivanišević (Switzerland) M Rosset | 2 | 5
(United States) S Melville (South Africa) P Norval | 4 | 6 | 7
(United States) M Bauer (South Africa) B Talbot | 6 | 4 | 5

Quarterfinals
Q | (Sweden) N Kulti (Sweden) M Larsson | 3 | 4
(Germany) MK Goellner (Italy) D Nargiso | 6 | 6
3 | (Netherlands) T Nijssen (Czech Republic) C Suk | 4 | 7 | 5
(United States) S Melville (South Africa) P Norval | 6 | 6 | 7

Semifinals
(Germany) MK Goellner (Italy) D Nargiso | 6 | 2 | 3
(United States) S Melville (South Africa) P Norval | 2 | 6 | 6

=== Bottom half ===
First round
5 | (Sweden) H Holm (Sweden) A Järryd | 6 | 6
(Mexico) J Lozano (Belgium) L Pimek | 4 | 4
(Australia) D Cahill (Australia) J Fitzgerald | 7 | 6
(Germany) D Prinosil (Germany) U Riglewski | 6 | 0
(South Africa) JL de Jager (United States) M Keil | 6 | 6
LL | (Germany) D Dier (Germany) T Theine | 2 | 2
8 | (Spain) J Sánchez (Czech Republic) D Vacek | 6 | 6
(Sweden) J Apell (Netherlands) M Koevermans | 3 | 4
(United States) B Pearce (United States) D Randall | 7 | 6
WC | (Germany) B Karbacher (Germany) J Renzenbrink | 6 | 4
WC | (Germany) L Burgsmüller (Germany) O Gross | 1 | 4
(Germany) P Kühnen (Germany) M Stich | 6 | 6

Second round
5 | (Sweden) H Holm (Sweden) A Järryd | 6 | 6
(Australia) D Cahill (Australia) J Fitzgerald | 4 | 2
(South Africa) JL de Jager (United States) M Keil | 2 | 6
4 | (South Africa) D Adams (Russia) A Olhovskiy | 6 | 7
8 | (Spain) J Sánchez (Czech Republic) D Vacek | 6 | 5 | 3
(United States) B Pearce (United States) D Randall | 3 | 7 | 6
(Germany) P Kühnen (Germany) M Stich | 6 | 4
2 | (Netherlands) J Eltingh (Netherlands) P Haarhuis | 7 | 6

Quarterfinals
5 | (Sweden) H Holm (Sweden) A Järryd | 7 | 6
4 | (South Africa) D Adams (Russia) A Olhovskiy | 6 | 3
(United States) B Pearce (United States) D Randall | 4 | 5
2 | (Netherlands) J Eltingh (Netherlands) P Haarhuis | 6 | 7

Semifinals
5 | (Sweden) H Holm (Sweden) A Järryd | 6 | 7
2 | (Netherlands) J Eltingh (Netherlands) P Haarhuis | 4 | 6
