= Diego Nargiso =

Italian former tennis player (born 1970)

- Country (sports): Italy
- Residence: Monte Carlo, Monaco
- Born: 15 March 1970 (age 56) Naples, Italy
- Height: 1.88 m (6 ft 2 in)
- Turned pro: 1987
- Retired: 2001
- Plays: Left-handed (one-handed backhand)
- Prize money: $1,807,857

Singles
- Career record: 100–154
- Career titles: 0
- Highest ranking: No. 67 (10 October 1988)

Grand Slam singles results
- Australian Open: 2R (1996)
- French Open: 2R (1992)
- Wimbledon: 3R (1988)
- US Open: 3R (1988)

Doubles
- Career record: 215–225
- Career titles: 5
- Highest ranking: No. 25 (5 March 1990)

Grand Slam doubles results
- Australian Open: 2R (1993)
- French Open: 3R (1989)
- Wimbledon: 2R (1989, 1990, 1992, 1995, 1996, 2000)
- US Open: 3R (1989, 1993, 1996)

Grand Slam mixed doubles results
- French Open: 2R (1990)
- Wimbledon: 2R (1995, 2000)
- US Open: QF (1995)

Diego Nargiso (Italian pronunciation: [ˈdjɛːɡo narˈdʒiːzo]; born 15 March 1970) is a former tennis player from Italy. Having turned professional in 1987, Nargiso represented his native country at the 1988 Summer Olympics in Seoul, where he was defeated in the second round by America's eventual runner-up Tim Mayotte. He also competed in the men's doubles at the 1992 and 1996 Olympics.

Nargiso was the first Italian tennis player to win the Junior Wimbledon championship, which he did in 1987. The left-handed Nargiso reached his highest singles ATP-ranking on 10 October 1988, when he became the number 67 in the world.

== ATP career finals ==
=== Singles: 2 (2 runner-ups) ===
Legend Grand Slam tournaments (0–0) ATP World Tour Finals (0–0) ATP World Tour Masters Series (0–0) ATP World Tour Championship Series (0–0) ATP World Tour World Series (0–2)	Titles by surface Hard (0–1) Clay (0–1) Grass (0–0) Carpet (0–0)	Titles by setting Outdoor (0–2) Indoor (0–0)

Result	W–L	Date	Tournament	Tier	Surface	Opponent	Score
Loss	0–1	Sep 1993	Bordeaux, France	World Series	Hard	(Spain) Sergi Bruguera	5–7, 2–6
Loss	0–2	Oct 2000	Palermo, Italy	World Series	Clay	(Belgium) Olivier Rochus	6–7^{(14–16)}, 1–6

=== Doubles: 20 (5 titles, 15 runner-ups) ===
Legend Grand Slam tournaments (0–0) ATP World Tour Finals (0–0) ATP World Tour Masters Series(0–1) ATP World Tour Championship Series (1–0) ATP World Tour World Series (4–14)	Titles by surface Hard (1–2) Clay (3–9) Grass (0–2) Carpet (1–2)	Titles by setting Outdoor (4–13) Indoor (1–2)

Result	W–L	Date	Tournament	Tier	Surface	Partner	Opponents	Score
Loss	0–1	Feb 1988	Rotterdam, Netherlands	Grand Prix	Carpet	(Sweden) Magnus Gustafsson	(West Germany) Patrik Kühnen (West Germany) Tore Meinecke	6–7, 6–7
Loss	0–2	Apr 1988	Nice, France	Grand Prix	Clay	(Switzerland) Heinz Günthardt	(France) Guy Forget (France) Henri Leconte	6–4, 3–6, 4–6
Loss	0–3	Jul 1988	Bordeaux, France	Grand Prix	Clay	(Argentina) Christian Miniussi	(Sweden) Joakim Nyström (Italy) Claudio Panatta	1–6, 4–6
Loss	0–4	Apr 1989	Monte Carlo, Monaco	Grand Prix	Clay	(Italy) Paolo Canè	(Czechoslovakia) Tomáš Šmíd (Australia) Mark Woodforde	6–1, 4–6, 2–6
Loss	0–5	Oct 1989	Palermo, Italy	Grand Prix	Clay	(Croatia) Goran Ivanišević	(West Germany) Peter Ballauff (West Germany) Rüdiger Haas	2–6, 7–6, 4–6
Win	1–5	Feb 1990	Milan, Italy	World Series	Carpet	(Italy) Omar Camporese	(Germany) Udo Riglewski (New Zealand) Tom Nijssen	6–4, 6–4
Loss	1–6	Mar 1990	Rotterdam, Netherlands	World Series	Carpet	(Venezuela) Nicolás Pereira	(Mexico) Leonardo Lavalle (Mexico) Jorge Lozano	6–7, 4–6
Win	2–6	Apr 1991	Barcelona, Spain	Championship Series	Clay	(Argentina) Horacio de la Peña	(Germany) Boris Becker (Germany) Eric Jelen	3–6, 7–6, 6–4
Loss	2–7	Aug 1991	Long Island, United States	World Series	Hard	(United States) Doug Flach	(Germany) Eric Jelen (Germany) Carl-Uwe Steeb	6–0, 4–6, 6–7
Loss	2–8	Jun 1992	London (Queen's), United Kingdom	World Series	Grass	(Croatia) Goran Ivanišević	(Australia) John Fitzgerald (Sweden) Anders Järryd	4–6, 6–7
Win	3–8	Jan 1993	Jakarta, Indonesia	World Series	Hard	(France) Guillaume Raoux	(New Zealand) Jacco Eltingh (New Zealand) Paul Haarhuis	7–6, 6–7, 6–3
Loss	3–9	Jun 1994	Rosmalen, Netherlands	World Series	Grass	(Sweden) Peter Nyborg	(Netherlands) Stephen Noteboom (Netherlands) Fernon Wibier	3–6, 6–1, 6–7
Loss	3–10	Sep 1994	Bordeaux, France	World Series	Hard	(France) Guillaume Raoux	(France) Olivier Delaître (France) Guy Forget	2–6, 6–2, 5–7
Loss	3–11	Mar 1995	Mexico City, Mexico	World Series	Clay	(Germany) Marc-Kevin Goellner	(Argentina) Javier Frana (Mexico) Leonardo Lavalle	5–7, 3–6
Loss	3–12	Apr 1995	Estoril, Portugal	World Series	Clay	(Germany) Marc-Kevin Goellner	(Russia) Yevgeny Kafelnikov (Russia) Andrei Olhovskiy	7–5, 5–7, 2–6
Loss	3–13	May 1996	Munich, Germany	World Series	Clay	(France) Olivier Delaître	(South Africa) Lan Bale (Netherlands) Stephen Noteboom	6–4, 6–7, 4–6
Win	4–13	Mar 1998	Casablanca, Morocco	World Series	Clay	(Italy) Andrea Gaudenzi	(Italy) Cristian Brandi (Italy) Filippo Messori	6–4, 7–6
Win	5–13	May 2000	Majorca, Spain	World Series	Clay	(France) Michaël Llodra	(Spain) Alberto Martín (Spain) Fernando Vicente	7–6^{(7–2)}, 7–6^{(7–3)}
Loss	5–14	May 2000	St. Polten, Austria	World Series	Clay	(Italy) Andrea Gaudenzi	(India) Mahesh Bhupathi (Australia) Andrew Kratzmann	6–7^{(10–12)}, 7–6^{(7–2)}, 4–6
Loss	5–15	Jul 2000	Båstad, Sweden	World Series	Clay	(Italy) Andrea Gaudenzi	(Sweden) Nicklas Kulti (Sweden) Mikael Tillström	6–4, 2–6, 3–6

== ATP Challenger and ITF Futures finals ==
=== Singles: 7 (3–4) ===
Legend ATP Challenger (3–4) ITF Futures (0–0)	Finals by surface Hard (1–2) Clay (0–1) Grass (1–0) Carpet (1–1)

Result	W–L	Date	Tournament	Tier	Surface	Opponent	Score
Loss	0–1	May 1990	Ljubljana, Slovenia	Challenger	Clay	(Sweden) Magnus Larsson	5–7, 7–6, 6–7
Win	1–1	Jan 1991	Heilbronn, Germany	Challenger	Carpet	(Germany) Markus Zoecke	3–6, 7–6, 6–3
Win	2–1	Jun 1994	Annenheim, Austria	Challenger	Grass	(Czech Republic) Martin Damm	6–4, 6–2
Win	3–1	Aug 1997	Olbia, Italy	Challenger	Hard	(Italy) Daniele Musa	5–7, 6–2, 6–3
Loss	3–2	Aug 1998	Winnetka, United States	Challenger	Hard	(United States) Geoff Grant	7–5, 3–6, 5–7
Loss	3–3	Aug 1998	Binghamton, United States	Challenger	Hard	(Japan) Takao Suzuki	3–5 ret.
Loss	3–4	Feb 1999	Wolfsburg, Germany	Challenger	Carpet	(Germany) Axel Pretzsch	walkover

=== Doubles: 13 (5–8) ===
Legend ATP Challenger (5–8) ITF Futures (0–0)	Finals by surface Hard (0–0) Clay (2–6) Grass (1–1) Carpet (2–1)

Result	W–L	Date	Tournament	Tier	Surface	Partner	Opponents	Score
Loss	0–1	Mar 1990	Agadir, Morocco	Challenger	Clay	(Italy) Omar Camporese	(Czech Republic) Josef Čihák (Czech Republic) Cyril Suk	walkover
Win	1–1	Jan 1991	Heilbronn, Germany	Challenger	Carpet	(Italy) Stefano Pescosolido	(Germany) Christian Saceanu (Netherlands) Michiel Schapers	6–2, 6–2
Loss	1–2	Jul 1991	Neu-Ulm, Germany	Challenger	Clay	(Australia) Carl Limberger	(France) Tarik Benhabiles (France) Olivier Delaître	4–6, 6–7
Loss	1–3	Oct 1991	Siracusa, Italy	Challenger	Clay	(Italy) Stefano Pescosolido	(Italy) Massimo Boscatto (Italy) Cristian Brandi	6–3, 6–7, 6–7
Win	2–3	Jun 1995	Annenheim, Austria	Challenger	Grass	(Venezuela) Nicolás Pereira	(Germany) Karsten Braasch (Germany) Joern Renzenbrink	6–7, 6–4, 7–6
Loss	2–4	Jul 1995	Manchester, United Kingdom	Challenger	Grass	(Italy) Massimo Bertolini	(United Kingdom) Tim Henman (United Kingdom) Mark Petchey	3–6, 4–6
Loss	2–5	Jan 1996	Heilbronn, Germany	Challenger	Carpet	(Germany) Udo Riglewski	(Czech Republic) Pavel Vízner (Switzerland) Lorenzo Manta	3–6, 6–7
Win	3–5	Apr 1996	Napoli, Italy	Challenger	Clay	(Italy) Omar Camporese	(Latvia) Ģirts Dzelde (Sweden) Tomas Nydahl	3–6, 6–4, 7–6
Loss	3–6	Jun 1997	Prostějov, Czech Republic	Challenger	Clay	(United States) Scott Melville	(Czech Republic) Jiří Novák (Czech Republic) David Rikl	4–6, 2–6
Win	4–6	Feb 2000	Lübeck, Germany	Challenger	Carpet	(Italy) Giorgio Galimberti	(Germany) Karsten Braasch (Germany) Dirk Dier	6–4, 6–4
Loss	4–7	Apr 2000	Cagliari, Italy	Challenger	Clay	(Italy) Andrea Gaudenzi	(Czech Republic) Tomáš Cibulec (Czech Republic) Leoš Friedl	1–6, 6–3, 5–7
Win	5–7	May 2000	Zagreb, Croatia	Challenger	Clay	(France) Michaël Llodra	(Spain) Eduardo Nicolás Espin (Spain) Germán Puentes Alcañiz	6–2, 6–3
Loss	5–8	Jul 2000	Venice, Italy	Challenger	Clay	(Italy) Andrea Gaudenzi	(Spain) Julian Alonso (North Macedonia) Aleksandar Kitinov	6–7^{(3–7)}, 5–7

== Junior Grand Slam finals ==
=== Singles: 1 (1 title) ===
Result	Year	Tournament	Surface	Opponent	Score
Win	1987	Wimbledon	Grass	(Australia) Jason Stoltenberg	7–6, 6–4

=== Doubles: 2 (1 title, 1 runner-up) ===
Result	Year	Tournament	Surface	Partnet	Opponents	Score
Loss	1987	Wimbledon	Grass	(Italy) Eugenio Rossi	(Australia) Todd Woodbridge (Australia) Jason Stoltenberg	3–6, 6–7^{(2–7)}
Win	1987	US Open	Hard	(Croatia) Goran Ivanišević	(India) Zeeshan Ali (New Zealand) Brett Steven	3–6, 6–4, 6–3

== Performance timelines ==
Key
W	F	SF	QF	#R	RR	Q#	DNQ	A	NH

(W) winner; (F) finalist; (SF) semifinalist; (QF) quarterfinalist; (#R) rounds 4, 3, 2, 1; (RR) round-robin stage; (Q#) qualification round; (DNQ) did not qualify; (A) absent; (NH) not held; (SR) strike rate (events won / competed); (W–L) win–loss record.

=== Singles ===
Tournament	1987	1988	1989	1990	1991	1992	1993	1994	1995	1996	1997	1998	1999	2000	SR	W–L	Win %
Grand Slam tournaments
Australian Open	A	1R	1R	A	A	1R	1R	1R	A	2R	Q1	A	A	A	0 / 6	1–6	14%
French Open	A	A	1R	A	A	2R	A	Q1	1R	Q1	A	A	A	A	0 / 3	1–3	25%
Wimbledon	Q1	3R	1R	Q1	2R	1R	1R	1R	1R	1R	Q1	A	Q2	Q2	0 / 8	3–8	27%
US Open	A	3R	1R	1R	1R	2R	Q3	1R	A	Q1	A	A	A	Q2	0 / 6	3–6	33%
Win–loss	0–0	4–3	0–4	0–1	1–2	2–4	0–2	0–3	0–2	1–2	0–0	0–0	0–0	0–0	0 / 23	8–23	26%
Olympic Games
Summer Olympics	NH	2R	Not Held			A	Not Held			A	Not Held			A	0 / 1	1–1	50%
ATP Tour Masters 1000
Indian Wells Masters	A	A	A	A	A	A	A	Q1	A	1R	A	A	A	A	0 / 1	0–1	0%
Miami Open	A	A	2R	A	A	QF	1R	2R	1R	Q3	A	A	A	A	0 / 5	6–5	55%
Monte Carlo	A	A	2R	1R	A	A	1R	Q2	1R	1R	A	1R	Q2	A	0 / 6	1–6	14%
Stuttgart	NH	A	A	A	A	A	A	Q2	A	Q1	A	A	A	Q1	0 / 0	0–0	–
Hamburg	A	A	3R	A	A	A	Q1	2R	A	A	A	Q1	A	A	0 / 2	3–2	60%
Rome	A	2R	3R	2R	A	1R	1R	2R	Q1	1R	1R	1R	1R	A	0 / 10	5–10	33%
Canada Masters	A	A	3R	A	A	A	A	A	A	A	A	A	A	A	0 / 1	2–1	67%
Cincinnati Masters	A	A	A	A	A	1R	Q1	A	A	A	A	A	A	A	0 / 1	0–1	0%
Paris Masters	A	A	A	A	A	A	Q2	Q1	A	A	A	A	A	A	0 / 0	0–0	–
Win–loss	0–0	1–1	8–5	1–2	0–0	4–3	0–3	3–3	0–2	0–3	0–1	0–2	0–1	0–0	0 / 26	17–26	40%

=== Doubles ===
Tournament	1987	1988	1989	1990	1991	1992	1993	1994	1995	1996	1997	1998	1999	2000	2001	SR	W–L	Win %
Grand Slam tournaments
Australian Open	A	1R	1R	1R	A	1R	2R	1R	A	1R	1R	A	A	A	A	0 / 8	1–8	11%
French Open	A	1R	3R	1R	1R	1R	A	2R	1R	1R	A	A	A	1R	A	0 / 9	3–9	25%
Wimbledon	Q1	1R	2R	2R	1R	2R	A	1R	2R	2R	A	A	Q3	2R	1R	0 / 10	6–10	38%
US Open	A	2R	3R	1R	1R	1R	3R	1R	1R	3R	A	A	A	1R	A	0 / 10	7–10	41%
Win–loss	0–0	1–4	5–4	1–4	0–3	1–4	3–2	1–4	1–3	3–4	0–1	0–0	0–0	1–3	0–1	0 / 37	17–37	31%
Olympic Games
Summer Olympics	NH	1R	Not Held			2R	Not Held			1R	Not Held			A	NH	0 / 3	1–3	25%
ATP Tour Masters 1000
Indian Wells Masters	A	2R	A	A	1R	A	A	Q1	1R	Q1	A	A	A	A	A	0 / 3	1–3	25%
Miami Open	A	1R	QF	A	2R	1R	A	A	1R	1R	A	A	A	A	A	0 / 6	4–6	40%
Monte Carlo	A	1R	F	QF	1R	1R	1R	1R	A	1R	1R	1R	QF	1R	A	0 / 12	8–12	40%
Stuttgart	NH	A	A	A	A	A	A	SF	A	A	A	A	A	A	A	0 / 1	3–1	75%
Hamburg	A	QF	1R	A	A	1R	2R	SF	A	2R	A	Q2	A	A	A	0 / 6	7–6	54%
Rome	1R	2R	2R	1R	A	QF	1R	SF	2R	1R	1R	2R	A	2R	A	0 / 12	10–12	45%
Canada Masters	A	A	2R	A	A	A	A	A	A	A	A	A	A	A	A	0 / 1	0–1	0%
Cincinnati Masters	A	A	A	1R	A	1R	1R	A	A	A	A	A	A	A	A	0 / 3	0–3	0%
Paris Masters	A	A	A	2R	A	1R	A	1R	A	A	A	A	A	SF	A	0 / 4	4–4	50%
Win–loss	0–1	4–5	8–5	3–4	1–3	2–6	1–4	9–5	1–3	1–4	0–2	1–2	2–1	4–3	0–0	0 / 48	37–48	44%

=== Mixed doubles ===
Tournament	1988	1989	1990	91–94	1995	96–99	2000	2001	SR	W–L	Win %
Grand Slam tournaments
Australian Open	A	A	A	A	A	A	A	A	0 / 0	0–0	–
French Open	A	A	2R	A	A	A	A	A	0 / 1	1–1	50%
Wimbledon	A	A	1R	A	2R	A	2R	1R	0 / 4	2–4	33%
US Open	1R	A	A	A	QF	A	2R	A	0 / 3	3–3	50%
Win–loss	0–1	0–0	1–2	0–0	3–2	0–0	2–2	0–1	0 / 8	6–8	43%
