= Marc-Kevin Goellner =

German tennis player

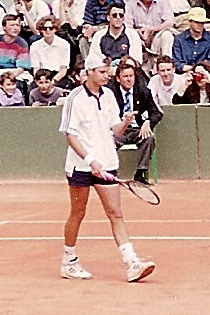
- Country (sports): Germany
- Residence: Germany
- Born: 22 September 1970 (age 55) Rio de Janeiro, Brazil
- Height: 1.96 m (6 ft 5 in)
- Turned pro: 1991
- Retired: 2004
- Plays: Right-handed (one-handed backhand)
- Prize money: $2,700,899

Singles
- Career record: 160–194
- Career titles: 2
- Highest ranking: No. 26 (4 April 1994)

Grand Slam singles results
- Australian Open: 2R (1993, 1997)
- French Open: 4R (1993)
- Wimbledon: 2R (1995, 1998)
- US Open: 3R (1993, 1994)

Doubles
- Career record: 188–173
- Career titles: 4
- Highest ranking: No. 25 (20 July 1998)

Grand Slam doubles results
- Australian Open: 3R (1996, 1998)
- French Open: F (1993)
- Wimbledon: SF (1994, 1995)
- US Open: 3R (1999)

Team competitions
- Davis Cup: W (1993)
Medal record
Olympic Games
Bronze medal – third place	1996 Atlanta	Doubles
- Last updated on: 1 December 2021.

Marc-Kevin Peter Goellner (born 22 September 1970) is a former professional tennis player from Germany. He won two singles titles, achieved a bronze medal in doubles at the 1996 Summer Olympics and attained a career-high singles ranking of World No. 26 in April 1994. Goellner reached the quarterfinals of the 1997 Rome Masters, defeating top tenners Richard Krajicek and Albert Costa en route.

== Personal life ==
The son of a German diplomat, Goellner lived in Rio de Janeiro, Tel Aviv and Sydney as a youngster before moving to Germany in 1986. The surname of his family is Göllner, but since most languages don't use umlaut, the Brazil authorities wrote Goellner in his birth certificate.

== Tennis career ==
In 1990, he suffered two torn ligaments in his left foot, which almost ended his tennis career before it had begun. He turned professional in 1991.

1993 provided some of the most significant highlights of Goellner's career. He captured his first top-level singles title at Nice, defeating Ivan Lendl in the final. He also won his first tour doubles title in Rotterdam, partnering David Prinosil. Goellner and Prinosil were also the men's doubles runners-up at the French Open that year. And Goellner was a member of the German team which won the 1993 Davis Cup, winning important singles rubbers in the quarter-finals, semi-finals and final.

In 1996, Goellner won a second top-level singles title at Marbella. He represented Germany at the 1996 Summer Olympics in Atlanta, where he was defeated in the first round of the singles competition by Sweden's Thomas Enqvist, and won a bronze medal in the doubles competition at Stone Mountain Park, partnering Prinosil.

During his career, Goellner won a total of two top-level singles titles and four tour doubles titles. His career-high rankings were World No. 26 in singles (in 1994), and World No. 25 in doubles (in 1998). His best singles performance at a Grand Slam event came at the French Open in 1993, where he reached the fourth round before losing to Andrei Medvedev. His career prize money earnings totalled US$2,700,215. He was one of the first players to wear baseball caps reversed. Goellner retired from the professional tour in 2004.

== ATP career finals ==
=== Singles: 3 (2 titles / 1 runner-up) ===
Legend Grand Slam Tournaments (0–0) ATP World Tour Finals (0–0) ATP Masters Series (0–0) ATP Championship Series (0–0) ATP World Series (2–1)	Finals by surface Hard (0–0) Clay (2–1) Grass (0–0) Carpet (0–0)	Finals by setting Outdoors (2–1) Indoors (0–0)

Result	W–L	Date	Tournament	Tier	Surface	Opponent	Score
Win	1–0	Apr 1993	Nice, France	World Series	Clay	(United States) Ivan Lendl	1–6, 6–4, 6–2
Loss	1–1	Sep 1996	Bournemouth, United Kingdom	World Series	Clay	(Spain) Albert Costa	7–6^{(7–4)}, 2–6, 2–6
Win	2–1	Oct 1996	Marbella, Spain	World Series	Clay	(Spain) Àlex Corretja	7–6^{(7–4)}, 7–6^{(7–2)}

=== Doubles: 15 (4 titles / 11 runner-up) ===
Legend Grand Slam Tournaments (0–1) ATP World Tour Finals (0–0) ATP Masters Series (0–0) ATP Championship Series (0–1) ATP World Series (4–9)	Finals by surface Hard (2–0) Clay (1–7) Grass (0–2) Carpet (1–2)	Finals by setting Outdoors (2–9) Indoors (2–2)

Result	W–L	Date	Tournament	Tier	Surface	Partner	Opponents	Score
Win	1–0	Mar 1992	Rotterdam, Netherlands	World Series	Carpet	(Germany) David Prinosil	(Netherlands) Paul Haarhuis (Netherlands) Mark Koevermans	6–2, 6–7, 7–6
Loss	1–1	May 1993	Roland Garos, France	Grand Slam	Clay	(Germany) David Prinosil	(United States) Luke Jensen (United States) Murphy Jensen	4–6, 7–6, 4–6
Loss	1–2	Jun 1993	Halle, Germany	World Series	Grass	(United States) Mike Bauer	(Czechoslovakia) Petr Korda (Czech Republic) Cyril Suk	6–7, 7–5, 3–6
Win	2–2	Aug 1993	Long Island, United States	World Series	Hard	(Germany) David Prinosil	(France) Arnaud Boetsch (France) Olivier Delaître	6–7, 7–5, 6–2
Loss	2–3	Mar 1995	Mexico City, Mexico	World Series	Clay	(Italy) Diego Nargiso	(Argentina) Javier Frana (Mexico) Leonardo Lavalle	5–7, 3–6
Loss	2–4	Apr 1995	Estoril, Portugal	World Series	Clay	(Italy) Diego Nargiso	(Russia) Yevgeny Kafelnikov (Russia) Andrei Olhovskiy	7–5, 5–7, 2–6
Win	3–4	Sep 1996	Bournemouth, United Kingdom	World Series	Clay	(United Kingdom) Greg Rusedski	(France) Rodolphe Gilbert (Portugal) Nuno Marques	6–3, 7–6
Loss	3–5	Oct 1997	Vienna, Austria	Championship Series	Carpet	(Germany) David Prinosil	(South Africa) Ellis Ferreira (United States) Patrick Galbraith	3–6, 4–6
Win	4–5	Nov 1997	Stockholm, Sweden	World Series	Hard	(United States) Richey Reneberg	(South Africa) Ellis Ferreira (United States) Patrick Galbraith	6–3, 3–6, 7–6
Loss	4–6	Jun 1998	Halle, Germany	World Series	Grass	(South Africa) John-Laffnie de Jager	(South Africa) Ellis Ferreira (United States) Rick Leach	6–4, 4–6, 6–7
Loss	4–7	Feb 1999	Copenhagen, Denmark	World Series	Carpet	(Germany) David Prinosil	(Belarus) Max Mirnyi (Russia) Andrei Olhovskiy	7–6^{(7–5)}, 6–7^{(4–7)}, 1–6
Loss	4–8	Jun 1999	Merano, Italy	World Series	Clay	(Philippines) Eric Taino	(Argentina) Lucas Arnold Ker (Brazil) Jaime Oncins	4–6, 6–7^{(1–7)}
Loss	4–9	Nov 1999	Bucharest, Romania	World Series	Clay	(United States) Francisco Montana	(Argentina) Lucas Arnold Ker (Argentina) Martín García	3–6, 6–2, 3–6
Loss	4–10	Oct 2000	Palermo, Italy	World Series	Clay	(Argentina) Pablo Albano	(Spain) Tomás Carbonell (Argentina) Martín García	walkover
Loss	4–11	Sep 2001	Bucharest, Romania	World Series	Clay	(Argentina) Pablo Albano	(North Macedonia) Aleksandar Kitinov (Sweden) Johan Landsberg	4–6, 7–6^{(7–5)}, [6–10]

== ATP Challenger and ITF Futures Finals ==
=== Singles: 5 (3–2) ===
Legend ATP Challenger (3–1) ITF Futures (0–1)	Finals by surface Hard (1–0) Clay (2–2) Grass (0–0) Carpet (0–0)

Result	W–L	Date	Tournament	Tier	Surface	Opponent	Score
Win	1–0	May 1992	Antwerp, Belgium	Challenger	Clay	(Italy) Massimo Ardinghi	4–6, 6–3, 7–5
Win	2–0	Jun 1992	Halle, Germany	Challenger	Clay	(Sweden) Thomas Enqvist	6–3, 2–6, 7–6
Loss	2–1	Jul 1992	Ulm, Germany	Challenger	Clay	(South Africa) Marcos Ondruska	6–7, 1–6
Loss	2–2	Apr 2003	Germany F1, Riemerling	Futures	Clay	(Sweden) Robert Lindstedt	6–7^{(4–7)}, 6–7^{(4–7)}
Win	3–2	Aug 2003	Bukhara, Uzbekistan	Challenger	Hard	(Cyprus) Marcos Baghdatis	7–5, 6–7^{(2–7)}, 7–6^{(7–4)}

=== Doubles: 6 (3–3) ===
Legend ATP Challenger (3–3) ITF Futures (0–0)	Finals by surface Hard (0–0) Clay (3–1) Grass (0–0) Carpet (0–2)

Result	W–L	Date	Tournament	Tier	Surface	Partner	Opponents	Score
Win	1–0	Oct 1991	Casablanca, Morocco	Challenger	Clay	(Haiti) Bertrand Madsen	(France) Tarik Benhabiles (Argentina) Gustavo Garetto	6–0, 6–2
Win	2–0	Jun 1992	Cologne, Germany	Challenger	Clay	(Germany) Bernd Karbacher	(United States) Brian Devening (United States) Murphy Jensen	6–4, 6–7, 6–1
Loss	2–1	Nov 1992	Guadalajara, Mexico	Challenger	Clay	(Germany) Christian Saceanu	(South Africa) Royce Deppe (Czech Republic) David Rikl	6–7, 4–6
Loss	2–2	Feb 1993	Rennes, France	Challenger	Carpet	(Portugal) João Cunha-Silva	(Sweden) Jan Apell (Sweden) Jonas Björkman	6–7, 3–6
Loss	2–3	Nov 2001	Aachen, Germany	Challenger	Carpet	(South Africa) Marcos Ondruska	(Austria) Julian Knowle (Germany) Michael Kohlmann	3–6, 6–7^{(4–7)}
Win	3–3	Jul 2004	Montauban, France	Challenger	Clay	(Spain) Álex López Morón	(Argentina) Brian Dabul (Argentina) Ignacio Gonzalez-King	6–3, 5–7, 7–6^{(7–5)}

== Performance timelines ==
Key
W	F	SF	QF	#R	RR	Q#	DNQ	A	NH

(W) winner; (F) finalist; (SF) semifinalist; (QF) quarterfinalist; (#R) rounds 4, 3, 2, 1; (RR) round-robin stage; (Q#) qualification round; (DNQ) did not qualify; (A) absent; (NH) not held; (SR) strike rate (events won / competed); (W–L) win–loss record.

=== Singles ===
Tournament	1992	1993	1994	1995	1996	1997	1998	1999	2000	2001	SR	W–L	Win %
Grand Slam tournaments
Australian Open	A	2R	A	1R	1R	2R	1R	Q2	A	Q1	0 / 5	2–5	29%
French Open	A	4R	1R	2R	1R	1R	2R	A	A	1R	0 / 7	5–7	42%
Wimbledon	A	1R	1R	2R	1R	1R	2R	A	A	Q2	0 / 6	2–6	25%
US Open	2R	3R	3R	2R	A	1R	1R	Q2	Q2	Q1	0 / 6	6–6	50%
Win–loss	1–1	6–4	2–3	3–4	0–3	1–4	2–4	0–0	0–0	0–1	0 / 24	15–24	38%
ATP Masters Series
Indian Wells	A	A	2R	A	A	1R	A	A	A	A	0 / 2	1–2	33%
Miami	A	A	2R	A	A	1R	A	A	A	Q1	0 / 2	0–2	0%
Monte Carlo	A	A	A	Q3	1R	A	A	Q2	A	A	0 / 1	0–1	0%
Hamburg	A	3R	1R	2R	2R	1R	1R	A	1R	A	0 / 7	4–7	36%
Rome	A	A	1R	2R	Q3	QF	1R	A	A	A	0 / 4	4–4	50%
Canada	A	A	A	A	1R	A	A	A	A	A	0 / 1	0–1	0%
Cincinnati	A	A	1R	1R	A	1R	A	A	A	A	0 / 3	0–3	0%
Stuttgart	A	A	A	A	1R	1R	A	A	A	A	0 / 2	0–2	0%
Paris	A	1R	Q1	A	Q3	2R	A	A	A	A	0 / 2	1–2	33%
Win–loss	0–0	2–2	1–5	2–3	1–4	4–7	0–2	0–0	0–1	0–0	0 / 24	10–24	29%

=== Doubles ===
Tournament	1992	1993	1994	1995	1996	1997	1998	1999	2000	2001	2002	SR	W–L	Win %
Grand Slam tournaments
Australian Open	A	1R	A	2R	3R	2R	3R	2R	A	A	A	0 / 6	7–6	54%
French Open	1R	F	2R	1R	1R	A	3R	A	1R	1R	A	0 / 8	8–8	50%
Wimbledon	A	A	SF	SF	3R	1R	2R	1R	2R	2R	1R	0 / 9	13–9	59%
US Open	A	2R	A	A	A	A	1R	3R	1R	1R	A	0 / 5	3–5	38%
Win–loss	0–1	6–3	5–2	5–3	4–3	1–2	5–4	3–3	1–3	1–3	0–1	0 / 28	31–28	53%
ATP Masters Series
Indian Wells	A	A	1R	A	A	QF	A	A	A	A	A	0 / 2	2–2	50%
Miami	A	A	1R	A	A	3R	A	A	1R	Q1	A	0 / 3	2–3	40%
Monte Carlo	A	2R	A	A	2R	A	A	2R	A	A	A	0 / 3	3–3	50%
Hamburg	2R	QF	SF	QF	2R	2R	1R	A	QF	A	A	0 / 8	12–8	60%
Rome	A	A	SF	2R	A	Q2	1R	A	A	2R	A	0 / 4	5–4	56%
Cincinnati	A	A	1R	1R	A	QF	A	A	Q2	A	A	0 / 3	2–3	40%
Stuttgart	A	A	A	A	A	2R	2R	A	A	A	A	0 / 2	2–2	50%
Paris	A	2R	A	A	A	Q1	A	A	A	A	A	0 / 1	1–1	50%
Win–loss	1–1	4–3	6–5	3–3	2–2	8–5	1–3	1–1	2–2	1–1	0–0	0 / 26	29–26	53%
