= David Prinosil =

German tennis player

- Country (sports): Germany
- Residence: Munich, Germany
- Born: 9 March 1973 (age 53) Olomouc, Czechoslovakia
- Height: 1.85 m (6 ft 1 in)
- Turned pro: 1991
- Plays: Right-handed (two-handed backhand)
- Prize money: $4,016,496

Singles
- Career record: 169–221
- Career titles: 3; 5 Challenger, 0 Futures
- Highest ranking: No. 28 (23 April 2001)

Grand Slam singles results
- Australian Open: 3R (1995, 2001)
- French Open: 3R (1992)
- Wimbledon: 4R (2000)
- US Open: 2R (1996, 1999)

Other tournaments
- Olympic Games: 1R (1996, 2000)

Doubles
- Career record: 254–208
- Career titles: 10; 4 Challenger, 0 Futures
- Highest ranking: No. 12 (20 August 2001)

Grand Slam doubles results
- Australian Open: F (2001)
- French Open: F (1993)
- Wimbledon: QF (2002)
- US Open: SF (1999)
Medal record
Men's Tennis
Bronze medal – third place	1996 Atlanta	Doubles
- Last updated on: 29 November 2021.

David Prinosil (Czech: David Přinosil; born 9 March 1973) is a former tennis player from Germany, who turned professional in 1991.

Prinosil was born in Olomouc, Czechoslovakia, but later moved to Germany. He represented his country at the 1996 Summer Olympics in Atlanta, where he was defeated in the first round by Daniel Vacek of the Czech Republic. In the doubles competition in Stone Mountain Park he won the bronze medal partnering Marc-Kevin Goellner. He was the first opponent of Tim Henman in the main draw of a Grand Slam tournament, in the first round of Wimbledon in 1994.

The right-hander reached the fourth round of Wimbledon in 2000 and the quarterfinals of the Rome Masters in 1999 and the Paris Masters in 2000. Prinosil won three career titles in singles, and reached his highest singles ATP-ranking on 23 April 2001, when he became world No. 28. He began playing for Germany in the Davis Cup in 1996.

Prinosil achieved an upset victory over Greg Rusedski in the second round of the Ericsson Open Masters tournament in 2001 with strong returns. Rusedski had recently beaten Andre Agassi. Prinosil and Rusedski had gone through rehabilitation together after foot surgeries in the same hospital in 1999.

== ATP career finals ==
=== Singles: 6 (3 titles, 3 runner-ups) ===
Legend Grand Slam Tournaments (0–0) ATP World Tour Finals (0–0) ATP Masters Series (0–0) ATP Championship Series (0–0) ATP International Series (3–3)	Finals by surface Hard (0–0) Clay (0–0) Grass (2–0) Carpet (1–3)	Finals by setting Outdoors (2–0) Indoors (1–3)

Result	W–L	Date	Tournament	Tier	Surface	Opponent	Score
Win	1–0	Jul 1995	Newport, United States	World Series	Grass	(United States) David Wheaton	7–6^{(7–3)}, 5–7, 6–2
Win	2–0	Oct 1996	Ostrava, Czech Republic	World Series	Carpet	(Czech Republic) Petr Korda	6–1, 6–2
Loss	2–1	Mar 1998	Copenhagen, Denmark	International Series	Carpet	(Sweden) Magnus Gustafsson	6–3, 1–6, 1–6
Loss	2–2	Feb 1999	St. Petersburg, Russia	International Series	Carpet	(Switzerland) Marc Rosset	3–6, 4–6
Win	3–2	Jun 2000	Halle, Germany	International Series	Grass	(Netherlands) Richard Krajicek	6–3, 6–2
Loss	3–3	Oct 2000	Moscow, Russia	International Series	Carpet	(Russia) Yevgeny Kafelnikov	2–6, 5–7

=== Doubles: 21 (10 titles, 11 runner-ups) ===
Legend Grand Slam Tournaments (0–2) ATP World Tour Finals (0–0) ATP Masters Series (0–1) ATP Championship Series (2–1) ATP World Series (8–7)	Finals by surface Hard (4–4) Clay (1–1) Grass (1–1) Carpet (4–5)	Finals by setting Outdoors (5–5) Indoors (5–6)

Result	W–L	Date	Tournament	Tier	Surface	Partner	Opponents	Score
Win	1–0	Mar 1992	Rotterdam, Netherlands	World Series	Carpet	(Germany) Marc-Kevin Goellner	(Netherlands) Paul Haarhuis (Netherlands) Mark Koevermans	6–2, 6–7, 7–6
Win	2–0	Aug 1992	Umag, Croatia	World Series	Clay	(Czech Republic) Richard Vogel	(Netherlands) Sander Groen (Germany) Lars Koslowski	6–7, 6–3, 7–6
Loss	2–1	Jun 1993	Roland Garos, France	Grand Slam	Clay	(Germany) Marc-Kevin Goellner	(United States) Luke Jensen (United States) Murphy Jensen	4–6, 7–6, 4–6
Win	3–1	Aug 1993	Long Island, United States	World Series	Hard	(Germany) Marc-Kevin Goellner	(France) Arnaud Boetsch (France) Olivier Delaître	6–7, 7–5, 6–2
Loss	3–2	Oct 1993	Toulouse, France	World Series	Carpet	(Germany) Udo Riglewski	(Zimbabwe) Byron Black (United States) Jonathan Stark	5–7, 6–7
Loss	3–3	Oct 1993	Vienna, Austria	World Series	Carpet	(United States) Mike Bauer	(Zimbabwe) Byron Black (United States) Jonathan Stark	3–6, 6–7
Loss	3–4	Mar 1994	Copenhagen, Denmark	World Series	Carpet	(Germany) Udo Riglewski	(Czech Republic) Martin Damm (New Zealand) Brett Steven	3–6, 4–6
Loss	3–5	Mar 1997	St. Petersburg, Russia	World Series	Carpet	(Czech Republic) Daniel Vacek	(Russia) Andrei Olhovskiy (New Zealand) Brett Steven	4–6, 3–6
Win	4–5	Aug 1997	Long Island, United States	International Series	Hard	(South Africa) Marcos Ondruska	(United States) Mark Keil (United States) T. J. Middleton	6–4, 6–4
Loss	4–6	Oct 1997	Vienna, Austria	Championship Series	Carpet	(Germany) Marc-Kevin Goellner	(South Africa) Ellis Ferreira (United States) Patrick Galbraith	3–6, 4–6
Win	5–6	Oct 1998	Ostrava, Czech Republic	International Series	Carpet	(Germany) Nicolas Kiefer	(South Africa) David Adams (Czech Republic) Pavel Vízner	6–4, 6–3
Loss	5–7	Mar 1999	Copenhagen, Denmark	International Series	Hard	(Germany) Marc-Kevin Goellner	(Belarus) Max Mirnyi (Russia) Andrei Olhovskiy	7–6^{(7–5)}, 6–7^{(4–7)}, 1–6
Win	6–7	Oct 1999	Vienna, Austria	Championship Series	Carpet	(Australia) Sandon Stolle	(South Africa) Piet Norval (South Africa) Kevin Ullyett	6–3, 6–4
Win	7–7	Mar 2000	Copenhagen, Denmark	International Series	Hard	(Czech Republic) Martin Damm	(Sweden) Jonas Björkman (Canada) Sébastien Lareau	6–1, 5–7, 7–5
Loss	7–8	Jun 2000	Halle, Germany	International Series	Grass	(India) Mahesh Bhupathi	(Sweden) Nicklas Kulti (Sweden) Mikael Tillström	6–7^{(4–7)}, 6–7^{(4–7)}
Loss	7–9	Oct 2000	Hong Kong, Hong Kong	International Series	Hard	(Slovakia) Dominik Hrbatý	(Zimbabwe) Wayne Black (South Africa) Kevin Ullyett	1–6, 2–6
Win	8–9	Oct 2000	Moscow, Russia	International Series	Carpet	(Sweden) Jonas Björkman	(Czech Republic) Jiří Novák (Czech Republic) David Rikl	6–2, 6–3
Loss	8–10	Jan 2001	Melbourne, Australia	Grand Slam	Hard	(Zimbabwe) Byron Black	(Sweden) Jonas Björkman (Australia) Todd Woodbridge	1–6, 7–5, 4–6, 4–6
Loss	8–11	Aug 2001	Cincinnati, United States	Masters Series	Hard	(Czech Republic) Martin Damm	(India) Leander Paes (India) Mahesh Bhupathi	6–7^{(3–7)}, 3–6
Win	9–11	Aug 2001	Washington, United States	Championship Series	Hard	(Czech Republic) Martin Damm	(United States) Bob Bryan (United States) Mike Bryan	7–6^{(7–5)}, 6–3
Win	10–11	Jun 2002	Halle, Germany	International Series	Grass	(Czech Republic) David Rikl	(Sweden) Jonas Björkman (Australia) Todd Woodbridge	4–6, 7–6^{(7–5)}, 7–5

== ATP Challenger and ITF Futures finals ==
=== Singles: 9 (5–4) ===
Legend ATP Challenger (5–4) ITF Futures (0–0)	Finals by surface Hard (0–1) Clay (1–0) Grass (0–1) Carpet (4–2)

Result	W–L	Date	Tournament	Tier	Surface	Opponent	Score
Win	1–0	Jan 1993	Heilbronn, Germany	Challenger	Carpet	(Czech Republic) Martin Damm	6–3, 7–6
Win	2–0	Jul 1993	Ulm, Germany	Challenger	Clay	(France) Olivier Delaître	6–3, 6–3
Win	3–0	Oct 1994	Dublin, Ireland	Challenger	Carpet	(Czech Republic) Radomír Vašek	6–3, 6–3
Loss	3–1	Nov 1994	Aachen, Germany	Challenger	Carpet	(Netherlands) Jan Siemerink	7–5, 6–7, 4–6
Win	4–1	Feb 1995	Wolfsburg, Germany	Challenger	Carpet	(Germany) Martin Sinner	6–4, 7–6
Win	5–1	Mar 1995	Hamburg, Germany	Challenger	Carpet	(Germany) Martin Sinner	6–1, 6–4
Loss	5–2	Nov 1996	Aachen, Germany	Challenger	Hard	(Russia) Alexander Volkov	3–6, 6–7
Loss	5–3	Nov 1999	Aachen, Germany	Challenger	Carpet	(Netherlands) Raemon Sluiter	6–2, 4–6, 6–7
Loss	5–4	Jul 2003	Bristol, United Kingdom	Challenger	Grass	(Italy) Massimo Dell'Acqua	4–6, 4–6

=== Doubles: 4 (4–0) ===
Legend ATP Challenger (4–0) ITF Futures (0–0)	Finals by surface Hard (0–0) Clay (3–0) Grass (0–0) Carpet (1–0)

Result	W–L	Date	Tournament	Tier	Surface	Partner	Opponents	Score
Win	1–0	Aug 1992	Graz, Austria	Challenger	Clay	(Czech Republic) Richard Vogel	(Czech Republic) Robert Novotny (Czech Republic) Milan Trněný	6–3, 6–4
Win	2–0	Sep 1992	Merano, Italy	Challenger	Clay	(Netherlands) Sander Groen	(France) Lionel Barthez (France) Alois Beust	6–4, 6–4
Win	3–0	Jul 1993	Ulm, Germany	Challenger	Clay	(Czech Republic) Richard Vogel	(Germany) Udo Riglewski (Mexico) Jorge Lozano	6–1, 6–3
Win	4–0	Mar 1995	Hamburg, Germany	Challenger	Carpet	(Germany) Martin Sinner	(South Africa) Clinton Ferreira (North Macedonia) Aleksandar Kitinov	6–2, 6–3

== Performance timelines ==
Key
W	F	SF	QF	#R	RR	Q#	P#	DNQ	A	Z#	PO	G	S	B	NMS	NTI	P	NH

(W) winner; (F) finalist; (SF) semifinalist; (QF) quarterfinalist; (#R) rounds 4, 3, 2, 1; (RR) round-robin stage; (Q#) qualification round; (P#) preliminary round; (DNQ) did not qualify; (A) absent; (Z#) Davis/Fed Cup Zonal Group (with number indication) or (PO) play-off; (G) gold, (S) silver or (B) bronze Olympic/Paralympic medal; (NMS) not a Masters tournament; (NTI) not a Tier I tournament; (P) postponed; (NH) not held; (SR) strike rate (events won / competed); (W–L) win–loss record.

=== Singles ===
Tournament	1991	1992	1993	1994	1995	1996	1997	1998	1999	2000	2001	2002	2003	SR	W–L	Win %
Grand Slam tournaments
Australian Open	A	A	2R	1R	3R	1R	1R	2R	1R	A	3R	Q1	1R	0 / 9	6–9	40%
French Open	A	3R	2R	2R	1R	1R	1R	2R	1R	1R	1R	Q1	Q1	0 / 10	5–10	33%
Wimbledon	Q2	A	2R	3R	1R	1R	A	2R	2R	4R	3R	Q2	Q1	0 / 8	10–8	56%
US Open	A	A	1R	A	1R	2R	1R	1R	2R	1R	1R	Q3	Q1	0 / 8	2–8	20%
Win–loss	0–0	2–1	3–4	3–3	2–4	1–4	0–3	3–4	2–4	3–3	4–4	0–0	0–1	0 / 35	23–35	40%
ATP Masters Series
Indian Wells	A	A	A	A	A	A	A	A	A	A	1R	Q1	A	0 / 1	0–1	0%
Miami	A	A	1R	A	A	A	A	1R	1R	1R	3R	A	A	0 / 5	1–5	17%
Monte Carlo	A	A	A	A	A	A	A	A	A	A	1R	A	A	0 / 1	0–1	0%
Hamburg	A	2R	1R	Q2	2R	1R	1R	1R	1R	A	1R	A	Q1	0 / 8	2–8	20%
Rome	A	A	A	A	A	A	1R	A	QF	A	1R	A	A	0 / 3	3–3	50%
Canada	A	A	A	A	A	A	A	A	A	A	1R	Q1	A	0 / 1	0–1	0%
Cincinnati	A	A	A	A	A	A	A	A	1R	A	1R	A	A	0 / 2	0–2	0%
Essen / Stuttgart	NMS				A	A	3R	1R	1R	A	1R	A	A	0 / 4	2–4	33%
Paris	A	A	A	A	A	A	2R	Q2	A	QF	A	A	A	0 / 2	4–2	67%
Win–loss	0–0	1–1	0–2	0–0	1–1	0–1	3–4	0–3	3–5	3–2	1–8	0–0	0–0	0 / 27	12–27	31%

=== Doubles ===
Tournament	1991	1992	1993	1994	1995	1996	1997	1998	1999	2000	2001	2002	2003	SR	W–L	Win %
Grand Slam tournaments
Australian Open	A	A	1R	1R	2R	3R	2R	3R	2R	A	F	QF	1R	0 / 10	15–9	63%
French Open	A	2R	F	1R	2R	1R	A	2R	QF	2R	3R	3R	1R	0 / 11	16–11	59%
Wimbledon	Q2	A	A	2R	3R	1R	A	2R	1R	3R	2R	QF	2R	0 / 9	11–9	55%
US Open	A	A	2R	A	2R	1R	1R	1R	SF	1R	3R	3R	A	0 / 9	10–9	53%
Win–loss	0–0	1–1	6–3	1–3	5–4	2–4	1–1	4–4	8–4	3–3	10–4	10–4	1–3	0 / 39	52–38	58%
ATP Masters Series
Indian Wells	A	A	A	A	A	A	A	A	A	A	2R	2R	A	0 / 2	2–2	50%
Miami	A	A	1R	A	A	A	A	1R	1R	2R	1R	2R	1R	0 / 7	0–7	0%
Monte Carlo	A	A	A	A	A	A	A	A	A	A	1R	1R	A	0 / 2	0–2	0%
Hamburg	A	2R	QF	1R	1R	2R	2R	1R	1R	1R	1R	A	QF	0 / 11	7–11	39%
Rome	A	A	A	A	A	A	Q2	A	A	A	A	A	A	0 / 0	0–0	–
Madrid	NH											1R	A	0 / 1	0–1	0%
Canada	A	A	A	A	A	A	A	A	A	A	1R	SF	A	0 / 2	3–2	60%
Cincinnati	A	A	A	A	A	A	A	A	QF	A	F	2R	A	0 / 3	7–3	70%
Essen / Stuttgart	NMS				QF	A	1R	2R	SF	SF	SF	A	A	0 / 6	11–6	65%
Paris	A	A	A	A	A	A	A	1R	A	2R	A	A	A	0 / 2	1–2	33%
Win–loss	0–0	1–1	2–2	0–1	2–2	1–1	1–2	1–4	4–4	4–4	8–7	5–6	2–2	0 / 36	31–36	46%
