= 1997 ATP German Open – Doubles =

Doubles
- 1997 ATP German Open

Final
- Champions: (Argentina) Luis Lobo (Spain) Javier Sánchez
- Runners-up: (United Kingdom) Neil Broad (South Africa) Piet Norval
- Score: 6–3, 7–6

Events
Singles	Doubles
← 1996 ·	German Open Tennis Championships	· 1998 →

Mark Knowles and Daniel Nestor were the defending champions, but lost in second round to qualifiers Alberto Berasategui and Alberto Martín.

Luis Lobo and Javier Sánchez won the title by defeating Neil Broad and Piet Norval 6–3, 7–6 in the final.

== Seeds ==
The top four seeds received a bye into the second round.

1. (Netherlands) Jacco Eltingh / (Netherlands) Paul Haarhuis (quarterfinals)
2. (The Bahamas) Mark Knowles / (Canada) Daniel Nestor (second round)
3. (South Africa) Ellis Ferreira / (United States) Patrick Galbraith (semifinals)
4. (Russia) Yevgeny Kafelnikov / (Russia) Andrei Olhovskiy (semifinals)
5. (Czech Republic) Libor Pimek / (South Africa) Byron Talbot (second round)
6. (Canada) Grant Connell / (United States) Jim Grabb (first round)
7. (Argentina) Luis Lobo / (Spain) Javier Sánchez (champions)
8. (United Kingdom) Neil Broad / (South Africa) Piet Norval (final)

== Draw ==
=== Key ===
- Q = Qualifier
- WC = Wild card
- LL = Lucky loser
- Alt = Alternate
- ITF = ITF entry
- PR = Protected ranking
- SR = Special ranking
- SE = Special exempt
- JE = Junior exempt
- JR = Junior Accelerator Programme entrant
- CO = College Accelerator Programme entrant
- NG = Next Gen Accelerator Program entrant
- w/o = Walkover
- r = Retired
- d = Defaulted

=== Finals ===
Semifinals
7	(Argentina) Luis Lobo (Spain) Javier Sánchez	6	7
3	(South Africa) Ellis Ferreira (United States) Patrick Galbraith	3	6
4	(Russia) Yevgeny Kafelnikov (Russia) Andrei Olhovskiy	4	4
8	(United Kingdom) Neil Broad (South Africa) Piet Norval	6	6

Final
7	(Argentina) Luis Lobo (Spain) Javier Sánchez	6	7
8	(United Kingdom) Neil Broad (South Africa) Piet Norval	3	6

=== Top half ===
First round
(Czech Republic) S Doseděl (Czech Republic) P Vízner	5	4
(Germany) MK Goellner (Germany) D Prinosil	7	6
(South Africa) D Adams (South Africa) W Ferreira	6	3	7
(Netherlands) HJ Davids (Netherlands) S Schalken	3	6	5
(Spain) T Carbonell (Spain) F Roig	4	7	2
7	(Argentina) L Lobo (Spain) J Sánchez	6	5	6
WC	(Germany) D Elsner (Germany) T Haas	4	5
WC	(Germany) B Becker (Germany) A Rădulescu	6	7
(Sweden) D Ekerot (Sweden) P Nyborg	6	4
(Argentina) P Albano (Brazil) G Kuerten	7	6
(Australia) J Eagle (Australia) A Florent	6	6
6	(Canada) G Connell (United States) J Grabb	4	3

Second round
1	(Netherlands) J Eltingh (Netherlands) P Haarhuis	7	6
(Germany) MK Goellner (Germany) D Prinosil	5	3
(South Africa) D Adams (South Africa) W Ferreira	3	6
7	(Argentina) L Lobo (Spain) J Sánchez	6	7
3	(South Africa) E Ferreira (United States) P Galbraith	6	6
WC	(Germany) B Becker (Germany) A Rădulescu	3	4
(Argentina) P Albano (Brazil) G Kuerten	6	1
(Australia) J Eagle (Australia) A Florent	7	6

Quarterfinals
1	(Netherlands) J Eltingh (Netherlands) P Haarhuis	4	4
7	(Argentina) L Lobo (Spain) J Sánchez	6	6
3	(South Africa) E Ferreira (United States) P Galbraith	6	5	7
(Australia) J Eagle (Australia) A Florent	3	7	6

Semifinals
7	(Argentina) L Lobo (Spain) J Sánchez	6	7
3	(South Africa) E Ferreira (United States) P Galbraith	3	6

=== Bottom half ===
First round
5	(Czech Republic) L Pimek (South Africa) B Talbot	6	6	6
WC	(Germany) L Burgsmüller (Germany) N Kiefer	7	2	1
(United States) T Kronemann (Australia) D Macpherson	6	6	6
(United States) D Johnson (United States) J Tarango	0	7	3
(Australia) P Kilderry (Netherlands) S Noteboom	4	4
(France) JP Fleurian (United States) J Waite	6	6
8	(United Kingdom) N Broad (South Africa) P Norval	3	6	6
(Australia) P Cash (South Africa) G Muller	6	0	2
(Netherlands) M Oosting (Netherlands) J Siemerink	3	6
WC	(Germany) K Braasch (Germany) J Knippschild	6	7
Q	(Sweden) O Kristiansson (Sweden) T Nydahl	4	3
Q	(Spain) A Berasategui (Spain) A Martín	6	6

Second round
5	(Czech Republic) L Pimek (South Africa) B Talbot	3	3
(United States) T Kronemann (Australia) D Macpherson	6	6
(France) JP Fleurian (United States) J Waite	1	4
4	(Russia) Y Kafelnikov (Russia) A Olhovskiy	6	6
8	(United Kingdom) N Broad (South Africa) P Norval	6	6
WC	(Germany) K Braasch (Germany) J Knippschild	2	3
Q	(Spain) A Berasategui (Spain) A Martín	6	6	7
2	(The Bahamas) M Knowles (Canada) D Nestor	3	7	5

Quarterfinals
(United States) T Kronemann (Australia) D Macpherson	2	6	4
4	(Russia) Y Kafelnikov (Russia) A Olhovskiy	6	3	6
8	(United Kingdom) N Broad (South Africa) P Norval	7	6
Q	(Spain) A Berasategui (Spain) A Martín	5	2

Semifinals
4	(Russia) Y Kafelnikov (Russia) A Olhovskiy	4	4
8	(United Kingdom) N Broad (South Africa) P Norval	6	6
