= Patrik Kühnen =

German tennis player (born 1966)

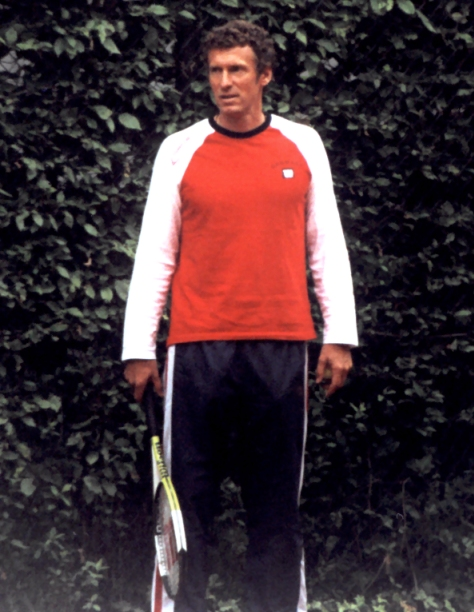
- Kühnen at the World Team Cup in Düsseldorf, Germany in 2005
- Country (sports): Germany
- Residence: Berlin, Germany
- Born: 11 February 1966 (age 60) Püttlingen, West Germany
- Height: 1.91 m (6 ft 3 in)
- Turned pro: 1985
- Retired: 1996
- Plays: Right-handed (one-handed backhand)
- Prize money: $1,645,528

Singles
- Career record: 127–153
- Career titles: 0; 0 Challenger, 0 Futures
- Highest ranking: No. 43 (15 May 1989)

Grand Slam singles results
- Australian Open: 3R (1989, 1991)
- French Open: 3R (1988, 1990, 1993)
- Wimbledon: QF (1988)
- US Open: 2R (1988, 1991, 1992, 1993)

Doubles
- Career record: 111–118
- Career titles: 3; 1 Challenger, 0 Futures
- Highest ranking: No. 28 (5 July 1993)

Grand Slam doubles results
- Australian Open: 3R (1991)
- French Open: 2R (1988, 1996)
- Wimbledon: SF (1993)
- US Open: 2R (1988)

Team competitions
- Davis Cup: W (1988, 1989, 1993)

Patrik Kühnen (German pronunciation: [ˈpatʁɪk ˈkyːnən]; born 11 February 1966) is a German former professional tennis player, who turned professional in 1985.

Kühnen had his biggest career singles win in the fourth round at Wimbledon in 1988 when he beat Jimmy Connors en route to the quarterfinals in which he lost to eventual champion Stefan Edberg. The right-hander reached his highest singles ATP-ranking on 15 May 1989, when he became the number 43 of the world. He won three doubles titles during his career. He was part of the German Davis Cup teams that won the competition in 1988 and 1993. Since 2003 he is the captain for Germany's Davis Cup team and also coaches the German team in the World Team Cup which won the competition in 2005 and 2011.

== ATP career finals ==
=== Singles: 2 (2 runner-ups) ===
Legend Grand Slam tournaments (0–0) ATP Masters Series (0–0) ATP Championship Series (0–0) ATP World Series (0–2)	Finals by surface Hard (0–1) Carpet (0–1)	Finals by setting Outdoors (0–1) Indoors (0–1)

Result	W–L	Date	Tournament	Tier	Surface	Opponent	Score
Loss	0–1	Jan 1989	Adelaide, Australia	Grand Prix	Hard	(Australia) Mark Woodforde	5–7, 6–1, 5–7
Loss	0–2	Nov 1993	Moscow, Russia	World Series	Carpet	(Switzerland) Marc Rosset	4–6, 3–6

=== Doubles: 6 (3 titles, 3 runner-ups) ===
Legend Grand Slam Tournaments (0–0) ATP Masters Series (0–0) ATP Championship Series (0–0) ATP World Series (3–3)	Finals by surface Hard (1–3) Carpet (2–0)	Finals by setting Outdoors (1–0) Indoors (2–3)

Result	W–L	Date	Tournament	Tier	Surface	Partner	Opponents	Score
Loss	0–1	Oct 1987	Toulouse, France	Grand Prix	Hard	(United States) Kelly Jones	(Poland) Wojciech Fibak (Netherlands) Michiel Schapers	2–6, 4–6
Win	1–1	Nov 1987	Frankfurt, West Germany	Grand Prix	Carpet	(Germany) Boris Becker	(United States) Scott Davis (United States) David Pate	6–4, 6–2
Win	2–1	Feb 1988	Rotterdam, Netherlands	Grand Prix	Carpet	(Germany) Tore Meinecke	(Sweden) Magnus Gustafsson (Italy) Diego Nargiso	7–6, 7–6
Loss	2–2	Sep 1991	Bordeaux, France	World Series	Hard	(Germany) Alexander Mronz	(France) Arnaud Boetsch (France) Guy Forget	2–6, 2–6
Win	3–2	Jan 1993	Doha, Qatar	World Series	Hard	(Germany) Boris Becker	(United States) Shelby Cannon (United States) Scott Melville	6–4, 6–2
Loss	3–3	Oct 1996	Beijing, China	World Series	Hard	(South Africa) Gary Muller	(Czech Republic) Martin Damm (Russia) Andrei Olhovskiy	4–6, 5–7

== ATP Challenger and ITF Futures finals ==
=== Doubles (1–2) ===
Legend ATP Challenger (1–2) ITF Futures (0–0)	Finals by surface Hard (0–1) Carpet (1–1)

Result	W–L	Date	Tournament	Tier	Surface	Partner	Opponents	Score
Loss	0–1	Oct 1991	Brest, France	Challenger	Hard	(Germany) Alexander Mronz	(Germany) Lars Koslowski (Germany) Arne Thoms	2–6, 6–1, 3–6
Win	1–1	Mar 1994	Garmisch, Germany	Challenger	Carpet	(Germany) Alexander Mronz	(Germany) Thomas Gollwitzer (South Africa) Brent Haygarth	6–4, 6–2
Loss	1–2	Mar 1996	Hamburg, Germany	Challenger	Carpet	(Germany) Karsten Braasch	(Czech Republic) Tomáš Krupa (Czech Republic) Pavel Vízner	3–6, 5–7

== Performance timelines ==
Key
W	F	SF	QF	#R	RR	Q#	DNQ	A	NH

(W) winner; (F) finalist; (SF) semifinalist; (QF) quarterfinalist; (#R) rounds 4, 3, 2, 1; (RR) round-robin stage; (Q#) qualification round; (DNQ) did not qualify; (A) absent; (NH) not held; (SR) strike rate (events won / competed); (W–L) win–loss record.

=== Singles ===
Tournament	1986	1987	1988	1989	1990	1991	1992	1993	1994	1995	1996	SR	W–L	Win %
Grand Slam tournaments
Australian Open	A	1R	2R	3R	2R	3R	1R	1R	2R	A	Q2	0 / 8	7–8	47%
French Open	A	1R	3R	1R	3R	2R	A	3R	A	A	A	0 / 6	7–6	54%
Wimbledon	Q1	1R	QF	3R	1R	3R	1R	1R	2R	A	A	0 / 8	9–8	53%
US Open	A	A	2R	A	1R	2R	2R	2R	A	A	A	0 / 5	4–5	44%
Win–loss	0–0	0–3	8–4	4–3	3–4	6–4	1–3	3–4	2–2	0–0	0–0	0 / 27	27–27	50%
ATP Masters Series
Miami	A	A	1R	A	A	A	1R	1R	A	A	Q2	0 / 3	0–3	0%
Monte Carlo	A	A	A	3R	A	A	A	A	Q1	A	A	0 / 1	2–1	67%
Hamburg	1R	A	1R	3R	2R	1R	1R	1R	2R	Q1	1R	0 / 9	4–9	31%
Rome	A	A	A	A	A	A	A	1R	A	A	A	0 / 1	0–1	0%
Canada	A	A	A	A	A	A	3R	1R	A	A	A	0 / 2	2–2	50%
Win–loss	0–1	0–0	0–2	4–2	1–1	0–1	2–3	0–4	1–1	0–0	0–1	0 / 16	8–16	33%

=== Doubles ===
Tournament	1987	1988	1989	1990	1991	1992	1993	1994	1995	1996	SR	W–L	Win %
Grand Slam tournaments
Australian Open	1R	1R	2R	2R	3R	2R	2R	1R	A	1R	0 / 9	6–9	40%
French Open	1R	2R	1R	A	A	A	1R	A	A	2R	0 / 5	2–5	29%
Wimbledon	A	3R	1R	A	A	A	SF	1R	A	1R	0 / 5	6–5	45%
US Open	A	2R	A	A	A	A	A	A	A	1R	0 / 2	1–2	33%
Win–loss	0–2	4–4	1–3	1–1	2–1	1–1	5–3	0–2	0–0	1–4	0 / 21	15–21	42%
ATP Masters Series
Miami	A	A	A	1R	A	3R	1R	A	A	1R	0 / 4	2–4	33%
Monte Carlo	A	A	1R	SF	A	A	A	1R	A	A	0 / 3	3–3	50%
Hamburg	A	QF	QF	1R	1R	A	1R	2R	A	1R	0 / 7	5–7	42%
Rome	A	A	A	A	A	A	SF	A	A	A	0 / 1	3–1	75%
Canada	A	A	A	A	A	1R	A	A	A	A	0 / 1	0–1	0%
Win–loss	0–0	2–1	2–2	3–3	0–1	2–2	3–3	1–2	0–0	0–2	0 / 16	13–16	–
