= 1994 ATP German Open =

- Date: 2–9 May
- Edition: 88th
- Category: Championship Series, Single Week
- Draw: 56S / 28D
- Prize money: $1,470,000
- Surface: Clay / outdoor
- Location: Hamburg, Germany
- Venue: Rothenbaum Tennis Center

Champions

Singles
- (Ukraine) Andrei Medvedev

Doubles
- (United States) Scott Melville / (South Africa) Piet Norval
← 1993 ·	ATP German Open	· 1995 →

The 1994 German Open was a men's tennis tournament played on outdoor clay courts. It was the 88th edition of the Hamburg Masters and was part of the ATP Championship Series, Single Week category of the 1994 ATP Tour. It took place at the Rothenbaum Tennis Center in Hamburg, Germany, from 2 May through 9 May 1994.

== Finals ==
=== Singles ===
(Ukraine) Andrei Medvedev defeated (Russia) Yevgeny Kafelnikov, 6–4, 6–4, 3–6, 6–3

- It was Medvedev's 2nd singles title of the year, and his 8th overall.

=== Doubles ===
(United States) Scott Melville / (South Africa) Piet Norval defeated (Sweden) Henrik Holm / (Sweden) Anders Järryd, 7–6, 6–3
