= 1995 ATP German Open =

- Date: 8–15 May
- Edition: 89th
- Category: Championship Series, Single Week
- Draw: 56S / 28D
- Prize money: $1,545,000
- Surface: Clay / outdoor
- Location: Hamburg, Germany
- Venue: Rothenbaum Tennis Center

Champions

Singles
- (Ukraine) Andrei Medvedev

Doubles
- (South Africa) Wayne Ferreira / (Russia) Yevgeny Kafelnikov
← 1994 ·	ATP German Open	· 1996 →

The 1995 German Open was a men's tennis tournament played on clay courts that was part of the Championship Series category of the 1995 ATP Tour. It was the 89th edition of the tournament and took place at the Rothenbaum Tennis Center in Hamburg, Germany, from 8 May to 15 May 1995. Andrei Medvedev won the singles title.

== Finals ==
=== Singles ===
(Ukraine) Andrei Medvedev defeated (Croatia) Goran Ivanišević, 6–3, 6–2, 6–1

- It was Andrei Medvedev's 1st singles title of the year, and the 9th of his career.

=== Doubles ===
(South Africa) Wayne Ferreira / (Russia) Yevgeny Kafelnikov defeated (Zimbabwe) Byron Black / (Russia) Andrei Olhovskiy, 6–1, 7–6
