= 1993 ATP German Open – Singles =

Singles
- 1993 ATP German Open

Final
- Champion: (Germany) Michael Stich
- Runner-up: (Russia) Andrei Chesnokov
- Score: 6–3, 6–7^{(1–7)}, 7–6^{(9–7)}, 6–4

Details
- Draw: 56
- Seeds: 16

Events
Singles	Doubles
← 1992 ·	ATP German Open	· 1994 →

Michael Stich defeated Andrei Chesnokov in the final, 6–3, 6–7^{(1–7)}, 7–6^{(9–7)}, 6–4 to win the 1993 Hamburg European Open.

Stefan Edberg was the defending champion, but was defeated by Emilio Sánchez in the third round.

== Seeds ==
A champion seed is indicated in bold text while text in italics indicates the round in which that seed was eliminated.

1. (Sweden) Stefan Edberg (third round)
2. (Germany) Boris Becker (third round)
3. (United States) Ivan Lendl (quarterfinals)
4. (Spain) ~~Sergi Bruguera~~ (withdrew)
5. (United States) Michael Chang (second round)
6. (Germany) **Michael Stich (champion)**
7. (Netherlands) Richard Krajicek (quarterfinals)
8. (Czech Republic) Karel Nováček (third round)
9. (South Africa) Wayne Ferreira (first round)
10. (France) Guy Forget (first round)
11. (Austria) Thomas Muster (third round)
12. (Spain) Carlos Costa (first round)
13. (Switzerland) Marc Rosset (second round, withdrew)
14. (South Africa) Marcos Ondruska (third round)
15. (Sweden) Magnus Larsson (first round)
16. (Spain) Emilio Sánchez (semifinals)

== Draw ==
=== Key ===
- Q = Qualifier
- WC = Wild card
- LL = Lucky loser
- Alt = Alternate
- SE = Special exempt
- PR = Protected ranking
- ITF = ITF entry
- JE = Junior exempt
- w/o = Walkover
- r = Retired
- d = Defaulted
- SR = Special ranking
- NB: The Final was the best of 5 sets.

=== Finals ===
Semifinals
16	(Spain) Emilio Sánchez	**7**	6^{3}	6^{2}
6	(Germany) **Michael Stich**	5	**7^{7}**	**7^{7}**
(Russia) **Andrei Chesnokov**	**6**	**6**
(Germany) Bernd Karbacher	2	4

Final
6	(Germany) **Michael Stich**	**6**	6^{1}	**7^{9}**	**6**
(Russia) Andrei Chesnokov	3	**7^{7}**	6^{7}	4

=== Top half ===
==== Section 1 ====
First round
(Uruguay) **M Filippini**	1	**6**	**7^{8}**
WC	(Germany) M Naewie	**6**	3	6^{6}
(Spain) **J Sánchez**	**6**	**7^{7}**
(Sweden) T Enqvist	1	6^{3}
Q	(Spain) J Gisbert-Schultze	4	**6**	5
16	(Spain) **E Sánchez**	**6**	4	**7**
10	(France) G Forget	5	6^{5}
Q	(Germany) **D Dier**	**7**	**7^{7}**
(Brazil) **J Oncins**	6^{5}	**6**	**6**
Q	(Slovakia) M Vajda	**7^{7}**	4	4
WC	(Germany) L Koslowski	3	4
(France) **R Gilbert**	**6**	**6**

Second round
1	(Sweden) **S Edberg**	**6**	**6**
(Uruguay) M Filippini	3	3
(Spain) J Sánchez	4	3
16	(Spain) **E Sánchez**	**6**	**6**
Q	(Germany) D Dier	3	1
(Brazil) **J Oncins**	**6**	**6**
(France) R Gilbert	4	**6**	6^{4}
7	(Netherlands) **R Krajicek**	**6**	2	**7^{7}**

Third round
1	(Sweden) S Edberg	**6**	6^{5}	4
16	(Spain) **E Sánchez**	4	**7^{7}**	**6**
(Brazil) J Oncins	2	4
7	(Netherlands) **R Krajicek**	**6**	**6**

Quarterfinals
16	(Spain) **E Sánchez**	6^{4}	**6**	**6**
7	(Netherlands) R Krajicek	**7^{7}**	3	3

==== Section 2 ====
First round
(Denmark) K Carlsen	1	2
(Argentina) **A Mancini**	**6**	**6**
(Sweden) A Järryd	2	3
WC	(Germany) **J Renzenbrink**	**6**	**6**
(Belgium) B Wuyts	**6**	3	6^{6}
14	(South Africa) **M Ondruska**	4	**6**	**7^{8}**
11	(Austria) **T Muster**	3	**6**	**6**
Q	(Germany) H Dreekmann	**6**	3	2
(Germany) P Kühnen	5	3
(France) **G Raoux**	**7**	**6**
(Spain) **J Arrese**	**6**	4	**7^{7}**
Q	(Haiti) R Agénor	3	**6**	6^{3}

Second round
3/WC	(United States) **I Lendl**	**6**	0	**6**
(Argentina) A Mancini	2	**6**	2
WC	(Germany) J Renzenbrink	5	2
14	(South Africa) **M Ondruska**	**7**	**6**
11	(Austria) **T Muster**	6^{5}	**6**	**6**
(France) G Raoux	**7^{7}**	3	1
(Spain) J Arrese	**6**	3	3
6	(Germany) **M Stich**	2	**6**	**6**

Third round
3/WC	(United States) **I Lendl**	2	**6**	**6**
14	(South Africa) M Ondruska	**6**	1	4
11	(Austria) T Muster	6^{4}	**6**	1
6	(Germany) **M Stich**	**7^{7}**	2	**6**

Quarterfinals
3/WC	(United States) I Lendl	3	2
6	(Germany) **M Stich**	**6**	**6**

=== Bottom half ===
==== Section 3 ====
First round
WC	(Germany) **M-K Goellner**	**6**	**6**
(France) O Delaître	1	4
(Brazil) L Mattar	2	3
(Italy) **R Furlan**	**6**	**6**
(Russia) **A Chesnokov**	**6**	4	**7^{7}**
12	(Spain) C Costa	3	**6**	6^{5}
13	(Switzerland) **M Rosset**	**7^{7}**	**6**
(Germany) D Prinosil	6^{5}	2
(Italy) O Camporese	2	4
(Spain) **F Clavet**	**6**	**6**
Q	(Argentina) **H de la Peña**	**6**
(Argentina) G Markus	4	r

Second round
5	(United States) M Chang	**7**	4	3
WC	(Germany) **M-K Goellner**	5	**6**	**6**
(Italy) R Furlan	**6**	0	1
(Russia) **A Chesnokov**	1	**6**	**6**
13	(Switzerland) M Rosset
(Spain) **F Clavet**	w/o
Q	(Argentina) **H de la Peña**	**6**	**6**
LL	(Sweden) L Jonsson	0	1

Third round
WC	(Germany) M-K Goellner	1	**6**	3
(Russia) **A Chesnokov**	**6**	4	**6**
(Spain) F Clavet	2	4
Q	(Argentina) **H de la Peña**	**6**	**6**

Quarterfinals
(Russia) **A Chesnokov**	**6**	**6**
Q	(Argentina) H de la Peña	2	0

==== Section 4 ====
First round
(Argentina) F Davín	4	1
(Russia) **A Olhovskiy**	**6**	**6**
(Sweden) **M Gustafsson**	**6**	**6**
(Argentina) G Pérez Roldán	1	2
(Sweden) **J Svensson**	**6**	**6**
9	(South Africa) W Ferreira	3	4
15	(Sweden) M Larsson	6^{6}	0
(Sweden) **C Bergström**	**7^{8}**	**6**
(Germany) **B Karbacher**	**6**	**6**
Q	(Germany) A Thoms	3	2
(Germany) **C-U Steeb**	**6**	**7^{7}**
(Netherlands) P Haarhuis	4	6^{4}

Second round
8	(Czech Republic) **K Nováček**	**6**	**6**
(Russia) A Olhovskiy	4	2
(Sweden) **M Gustafsson**	**6**	**7**
(Sweden) J Svensson	4	5
(Sweden) C Bergström	6^{2}	3
(Germany) **B Karbacher**	**7^{7}**	**6**
(Germany) C-U Steeb	4	2
2	(Germany) **B Becker**	**6**	**6**

Third round
8	(Czech Republic) K Nováček	**6**	3	6^{2}
(Sweden) **M Gustafsson**	2	**6**	**7^{7}**
(Germany) **B Karbacher**	**6**	**6**
2	(Germany) B Becker	3	4

Quarterfinals
(Sweden) M Gustafsson	**7**	5	4
(Germany) **B Karbacher**	5	**7**	**6**
