= Andrei Medvedev (tennis) =

Ukrainian tennis player

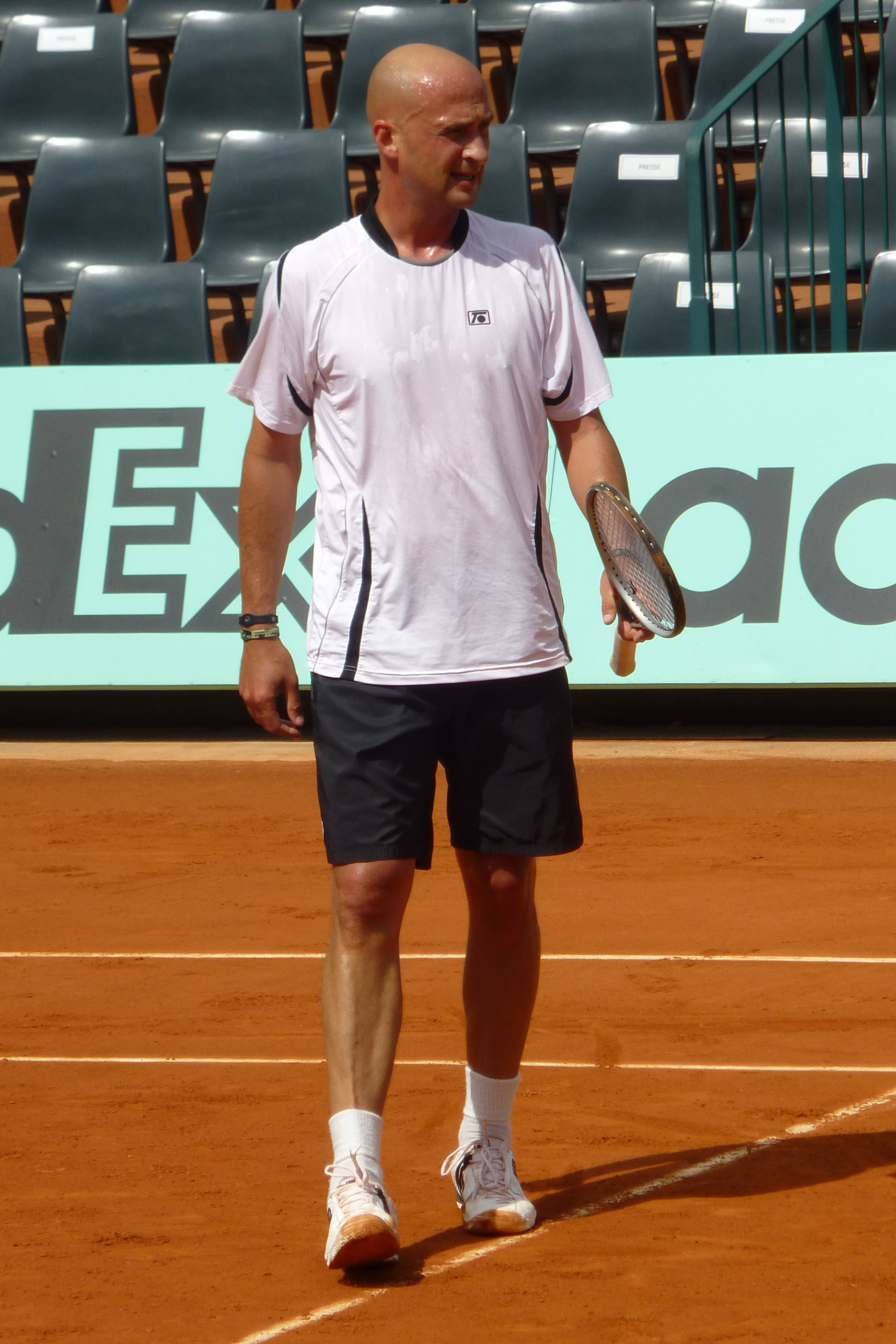
- Country (sports): Ukraine
- Born: 31 August 1974 (age 52) Kyiv, Ukrainian SSR, Soviet Union
- Height: 1.93 m (6 ft 4 in)
- Turned pro: 1991
- Retired: 2001
- Plays: Right-handed (two-handed backhand)
- Prize money: US$6,721,598

Singles
- Career record: 321–213 (60.1%)
- Career titles: 11
- Highest ranking: No. 4 (16 May 1994)

Grand Slam singles results
- Australian Open: QF (1995)
- French Open: F (1999)
- Wimbledon: 4R (1994)
- US Open: QF (1993)

Other tournaments
- Tour Finals: SF (1993)
- Grand Slam Cup: SF (1999)

Doubles
- Career record: 29–37 (43.9%)
- Career titles: 0
- Highest ranking: No. 185 (5 July 1993)

Grand Slam mixed doubles results
- Wimbledon: 2R (1994)
- Last updated on: 20 April 2025.

Andrei Medvedev (Ukrainian: Андрій Медведєв, romanized: Andriy Medvedyev; born 31 August 1974) is a Ukrainian former professional tennis player. Medvedev reached the final of the 1999 French Open, the French Open semifinals in 1993, and won four Masters titles during his career, achieving a career-high ranking of world No. 4 in May 1994.

== Career ==
In 1991, Medvedev won the junior singles title at the French Open.

As a 17 year old the following year, Medvedev won his first two ATP Tour titles in Genoa and Stuttgart (where he beat then-world No. 2 Stefan Edberg in the quarterfinals, and finished the season ranked within the world's top 25.

His most successful tournament was the Hamburg Masters (formerly the German Open), which he won three times (1994, 1995 and 1997). He reached a career-high singles ranking of world No. 4.

In the late 1990s, Medvedev's form and results began to flounder until he unexpectedly reached the final of the 1999 French Open where — ranked 100 — he defeated Dinu Pescariu, Pete Sampras, Byron Black, Arnaud Di Pasquale, Gustavo Kuerten and Fernando Meligeni en route. Medvedev dominated the first two sets of the final against Andre Agassi before Agassi mounted a come-from-behind victory, which allowed him to complete a career Grand Slam. Afterwards, Medvedev did not score further notable results, and retired from the tour in 2001.

One main rival of Medvedev was Sergi Bruguera. While their head-to-head record ended deadlocked at 5–5, Bruguera was able to win their two most important matches — the semifinals and quarterfinals of the 1993 and 1994 French Opens, respectively, with Bruguera winning both matches in straight sets.

In the French Open tournament, Medvedev lost six times to the eventual champion (1992–95, 1997 and 1999).

== Personal life ==
His sister, Natalia Medvedeva, formerly a top 25 player on the WTA Tour, partnered with Andrei to represent Ukraine at the seventh Hopman Cup in 1995, finishing runners-up to Germany's Boris Becker and Anke Huber (Medvedev's girlfriend back then) in the final.

== Grand Slam finals ==
=== Singles: 1 (runner-up) ===
Result	Year	Championship	Surface	Opponent	Score
Loss	1999	French Open	Clay	(United States) Andre Agassi	6–1, 6–2, 4–6, 3–6, 4–6

== Masters Series finals ==
=== Singles: 5 (4 titles, 1 runner-up) ===
Result	Year	Tournament	Surface	Opponent	Score
Loss	1993	Paris Masters	Carpet (i)	(Croatia) Goran Ivanišević	4–6, 2–6, 6–7^{(2–7)}
Win	1994	Monte Carlo Masters	Clay	(Spain) Sergi Bruguera	7–5, 6–1, 6–3
Win	1994	Hamburg Masters	Clay	(Russia) Yevgeny Kafelnikov	6–4, 6–4, 3–6, 6–3
Win	1995	Hamburg Masters	Clay	(Croatia) Goran Ivanišević	6–3, 6–2, 6–1
Win	1997	Hamburg Masters	Clay	(Spain) Félix Mantilla	6–0, 6–4, 6–2

== Career finals ==
=== Singles: 18 (11 titles, 7 runner-ups) ===
Legend Grand Slam tournaments (0–1) ATP Masters Series (4–1) ATP Championship Series (3–0) ATP Tour (4–5)	Finals by surface Hard (2–0) Grass (0–1) Clay (9–5) Carpet (0–1)

Result	W/L	Date	Tournament	Surface	Opponent	Score
Win	1–0	Jun 1992	Genoa, Italy	Clay	(Argentina) Guillermo Pérez Roldán	6–3, 6–4
Win	2–0	Jul 1992	Stuttgart, Germany	Clay	(South Africa) Wayne Ferreira	6–1, 6–4, 6–7^{(5–7)}, 2–6, 6–1
Win	3–0	Sep 1992	Bordeaux, France	Clay	(Spain) Sergi Bruguera	6–3, 1–6, 6–2
Win	4–0	Apr 1993	Estoril, Portugal	Clay	(Czech Republic) Karel Nováček	6–4, 6–2
Win	5–0	Apr 1993	Barcelona, Spain	Clay	(Spain) Sergi Bruguera	6–7^{(7–9)}, 6–3, 7–5, 6–4
Loss	5–1	Jun 1993	Halle, Germany	Grass	(France) Henri Leconte	2–6, 3–6
Win	6–1	Aug 1993	New Haven, US	Hard	(Czech Republic) Petr Korda	7–5, 6–4
Loss	6–2	Nov 1993	Paris, France	Carpet (i)	(Croatia) Goran Ivanišević	4–6, 2–6, 6–7^{(2–7)}
Loss	6–3	Apr 1994	Estoril, Portugal	Clay	(Spain) Carlos Costa	6–4, 5–7, 4–6
Win	7–3	Apr 1994	Monte Carlo, Monaco	Clay	(Spain) Sergi Bruguera	7–5, 6–1, 6–3
Win	8–3	May 1994	Hamburg, Germany	Clay	(Russia) Yevgeny Kafelnikov	6–4, 6–4, 3–6, 6–3
Loss	8–4	Aug 1994	Prague, Czech Republic	Clay	(Spain) Sergi Bruguera	3–6, 4–6
Win	9–4	May 1995	Hamburg, Germany	Clay	(Croatia) Goran Ivanišević	6–3, 6–2, 6–1
Loss	9–5	Jul 1996	Båstad, Sweden	Clay	(Sweden) Magnus Gustafsson	1–6, 3–6
Win	10–5	Aug 1996	Long Island, US	Hard	(Czech Republic) Martin Damm	7–5, 6–3
Win	11–5	May 1997	Hamburg, Germany	Clay	(Spain) Félix Mantilla	6–0, 6–4, 6–2
Loss	11–6	Jul 1998	Båstad, Sweden	Clay	(Sweden) Magnus Gustafsson	2–6, 3–6
Loss	11–7	Jun 1999	French Open, Paris	Clay	(United States) Andre Agassi	6–1, 6–2, 4–6, 3–6, 4–6

=== Doubles: 1 (runner-up) ===
Result	Date	Tournament	Surface	Partner	Opponents	Score
Loss	Nov 1999	Moscow, Russia	Carpet (I)	(Russia) Marat Safin	(United States) Justin Gimelstob (Czech Republic) Daniel Vacek	6–2, 6–1

=== Team ===
Result	Date	Tournament	Surface	Partner	Opponents	Score
Loss	Jan 1995	Hopman Cup, Perth	Hard	(Ukraine) Natalia Medvedeva	(Germany) Anke Huber (Germany) Boris Becker	0–2

== Junior Grand Slam finals ==
=== Singles: 1 (1 title) ===
Result	Year	Championship	Surface	Opponent	Score
Win	1991	French Open	Clay	(Sweden) Thomas Enqvist	6–4, 7–6

=== Doubles: 1 (1 runner-up) ===
Result	Year	Championship	Surface	Partner	Opponents	Score
Loss	1991	Wimbledon	Grass	(South Africa) John-Laffnie De Jager	(Morocco) Karim Alami (United Kingdom) Greg Rusedski	6–1, 6–7^{(4–7)}, 4–6

== Singles performance timeline ==
Key
W	F	SF	QF	#R	RR	Q#	DNQ	A	NH

(W) winner; (F) finalist; (SF) semifinalist; (QF) quarterfinalist; (#R) rounds 4, 3, 2, 1; (RR) round-robin stage; (Q#) qualification round; (DNQ) did not qualify; (A) absent; (NH) not held; (SR) strike rate (events won / competed); (W–L) win–loss record.

Tournament	1990	1991	1992	1993	1994	1995	1996	1997	1998	1999	2000	2001	Career SR	Career win–loss
Grand Slam tournaments
Australian Open	A	A	A	3R	A	QF	2R	4R	2R	2R	1R	2R	0 / 8	13–8
French Open	A	A	4R	SF	QF	4R	2R	4R	1R	F	4R	1R	0 / 10	29–10
Wimbledon	A	A	A	2R	4R	2R	1R	3R	2R	2R	1R	1R	0 / 9	9–9
US Open	A	A	A	QF	2R	2R	4R	1R	2R	4R	A	A	0 / 7	13–7
Grand Slam SR	0 / 0	0 / 0	0 / 1	0 / 4	0 / 3	0 / 4	0 / 4	0 / 4	0 / 4	0 / 4	0 / 3	0 / 3	0 / 34	N/A
Annual win–loss	0–0	0–0	3–1	12–4	8–3	9–4	5–4	8–4	3–4	11–4	3–3	1–3	N/A	64–34
Year-end championships
Tennis Masters Cup	DNQ			SF	Did not qualify								0 / 1	2–2
Grand Slam Cup	Was Not Invited				1R	QF	WNI			SF	Not Held		0 / 3	2–3
Masters Series
Indian Wells	A	A	A	A	A	2R	1R	1R	QF	A	1R	A	0 / 5	4–5
Miami	A	A	A	3R	A	QF	3R	QF	2R	2R	2R	1R	0 / 8	14–8
Monte Carlo	A	A	A	QF	W	1R	3R	3R	2R	1R	2R	1R	0 / 9	14–8
Rome	A	A	A	3R	3R	3R	QF	1R	1R	A	3R	1R	0 / 8	11–8
Hamburg	A	A	A	A	W	W	2R	W	1R	A	3R	1R	3 / 7	20–4
Canada	A	A	A	A	A	A	A	A	A	A	A	A	0 / 0	0–0
Cincinnati	A	A	A	3R	1R	2R	2R	3R	2R	A	A	A	0 / 6	7–6
Stockholm / Stuttgart	A	A	2R	1R	1R	2R	A	2R	A	1R	A	A	0 / 6	3–6
Paris	A	A	2R	F	1R	2R	A	A	A	2R	A	A	0 / 5	7–5
Masters Series SR	0 / 0	0 / 0	0 / 2	0 / 6	2 / 6	1 / 8	0 / 6	1 / 7	0 / 6	0 / 4	0 / 5	0 / 4	4 / 54	N/A
Annual win–loss	0–0	0–0	2–2	12–6	13–4	15–7	9–6	15–6	6–6	2–4	6–5	0–4	N/A	80–50
Year-end ranking
Ranking	1007	227	24	6	15	16	35	27	62	31	58	156	N/A	

== Top 10 wins ==
Season	1992	1993	1994	1995	1996	1997	1998	1999	2000	2001	Total
Wins	1	6	2	2	2	2	1	3	2	1	22

#	Player	Rank	Event	Surface	Round	Score	AMR
1992
1.	(Sweden) Stefan Edberg	No. 2	Stuttgart, Germany	Clay	QF	1–6, 6–4, 6–4	No. 100
1993
2.	(United States) Ivan Lendl	No. 9	Barcelona, Spain	Clay	QF	7–6^{(7–5)}, 6–2	No. 19
3.	(Sweden) Stefan Edberg	No. 3	French Open, Paris, France	Clay	QF	6–0, 6–7^{(3–7)}, 7–5, 6–4	No. 12
4.	(Czech Republic) Petr Korda	No. 9	New Haven, United States	Hard	F	7–5, 6–4	No. 12
5.	(Netherlands) Richard Krajicek	No. 9	US Open, New York, United States	Hard	4R	6–4, 3–6, 6–1, 7–6^{(7–4)}	No. 8
6.	(United States) Jim Courier	No. 2	ATP Finals, Frankfurt, Germany	Carpet	RR	6–3, 1–6, 7–6^{(7–4)}	No. 6
7.	(United States) Michael Chang	No. 7	ATP Finals, Frankfurt, Germany	Carpet	RR	2–6, 6–4, 6–2	No. 6
1994
8.	(United States) Jim Courier	No. 4	Monte Carlo, Monaco	Clay	QF	6–7^{(5–7)}, 7–5, 7–6^{(7–3)}	No. 9
9.	(Spain) Sergi Bruguera	No. 4	Monte Carlo, Monaco	Clay	F	7–5, 6–1, 6–3	No. 9
1995
10.	(United States) Pete Sampras	No. 2	Hamburg, Germany	Clay	SF	6–4, 2–6, 6–4	No. 20
11.	(Croatia) Goran Ivanišević	No. 5	Hamburg, Germany	Clay	F	6–3, 6–2, 6–1	No. 20
1996
12.	(Russia) Yevgeny Kafelnikov	No. 7	Antwerp, Belgium	Carpet	1R	6–1, 6–3	No. 17
13.	(Russia) Yevgeny Kafelnikov	No. 7	Rome, Italy	Clay	3R	3–6, 6–3, 6–0	No. 40
1997
14.	(Netherlands) Richard Krajicek	No. 5	Hamburg, Germany	Clay	2R	6–1, 6–1	No. 38
15.	(Russia) Yevgeny Kafelnikov	No. 4	Hamburg, Germany	Clay	SF	6–3, 6–1	No. 38
1998
16.	(Slovakia) Karol Kučera	No. 8	Ostrava, Czech Republic	Carpet	2R	6–4, 6–7^{(4–7)}, 6–4	No. 72
1999
17.	(United States) Pete Sampras	No. 2	French Open, Paris, France	Clay	2R	7–5, 1–6, 6–4, 6–3	No. 100
18.	(Brazil) Gustavo Kuerten	No. 8	French Open, Paris, France	Clay	QF	7–5, 6–4, 6–4	No. 100
19.	(Netherlands) Richard Krajicek	No. 9	Grand Slam Cup, Munich, Germany	Hard	QF	7–6^{(7–5)}, 6–4	No. 34
2000
20.	(United Kingdom) Tim Henman	No. 10	Estoril, Portugal	Clay	QF	6–2, 6–3	No. 34
21.	(Russia) Yevgeny Kafelnikov	No. 5	Stuttgart, Germany	Clay	2R	6–7^{(4–7)}, 7–5, 6–3	No. 48
2001
22.	(Germany) Tommy Haas	No. 10	St. Petersburg, Russia	Hard	1R	3–6, 7–6^{(9–7)}, 6–4	No. 72

== Main achievements ==
- 1991 Won junior French Open, beating Thomas Enqvist in the final
- 1992 Won the title in Stuttgart (Outdoor) with the strongest draw in the history of the event
- 1993 Semifinalist at the French Open and Masters in Frankfurt
- 1994 Won the titles in Monte Carlo and Hamburg (Super 9 events)
- 1995 Won the title in Hamburg
- 1997 Won the title in Hamburg title for the third time in four years
- 1999 Reached the final of the French Open
