= 1992 ATP German Open =

- Date: 4–11 May
- Edition: 86th
- Category: ATP Super 9
- Draw: 64S/32D
- Prize money: $1,000,000
- Surface: Clay / outdoor
- Location: Hamburg, Germany
- Venue: Rothenbaum Tennis Center

Champions

Singles
- (Sweden) Stefan Edberg

Doubles
- (Spain) Sergio Casal / (Spain) Emilio Sánchez
| ← 1991 · | ATP German Open | · 1993 → |

The 1992 German Open was a men's tennis tournament played on outdoor clay courts. It was the 86th edition of the Hamburg Masters (Hamburg Masters), and was part of the ATP Super 9 of the 1992 ATP Tour. It took place at the Rothenbaum Tennis Center in Hamburg, Germany, from 4 May until 11 May 1992. First-seeded Stefan Edberg won the singles title.

== Finals ==
=== Singles ===
(Sweden) Stefan Edberg defeated (Germany) Michael Stich 5–7, 6–4, 6–1,

- It was Stefan Edberg's 1st title of the year, and his 35th overall. It was his 1st Masters title of the year, and his 4th overall.

=== Doubles ===
(Spain) Sergio Casal / (Spain) Emilio Sánchez defeated (Germany) Carl-Uwe Steeb / (Germany) Michael Stich 5–7, 6–4, 6–3
