= 1997 ATP German Open – Singles =

Singles
- 1997 ATP German Open

Final
- Champion: (Ukraine) Andriy Medvedev
- Runner-up: (Spain) Félix Mantilla
- Score: 6–0, 6–4, 6–2

Details
- Draw: 56
- Seeds: 16

Events
Singles	Doubles
← 1996 ·	German Open Tennis Championships	· 1998 →

Andriy Medvedev defeated Félix Mantilla in the final, 6–0, 6–4, 6–2 to win the singles tennis title at the 1997 Hamburg European Open.

Roberto Carretero was the defending champion, but was defeated by Mantilla in the second round.

== Seeds ==
A champion seed is indicated in bold text while text in italics indicates the round in which that seed was eliminated. The top eight seeds received a bye into the second round.

1. (Austria) Thomas Muster (third round)
2. (Russia) Yevgeny Kafelnikov (semifinals)
3. (Netherlands) Richard Krajicek (second round)
4. (Spain) Carlos Moyà (second round)
5. (Chile) Marcelo Ríos (third round)
6. (South Africa) Wayne Ferreira (third round)
7. (Spain) Álbert Costa (quarterfinals)
8. (Germany) Boris Becker (third round)
9. (Spain) Álex Corretja (third round)
10. (Spain) Félix Mantilla (final)
11. (Spain) Alberto Berasategui (quarterfinals)
12. (Spain) Sergi Bruguera (quarterfinals)
13. (Switzerland) Marc Rosset (first round)
14. (Czech Republic) ~~Bohdan Ulihrach~~ (withdrew)
15. (Netherlands) Jan Siemerink (first round)
16. (Germany) Michael Stich (second round)

== Draw ==
=== Key ===
- Q = Qualifier
- WC = Wild card
- LL = Lucky loser
- Alt = Alternate
- SE = Special exempt
- PR = Protected ranking
- ITF = ITF entry
- JE = Junior exempt
- w/o = Walkover
- r = Retired
- d = Defaulted
- SR = Special ranking

=== Finals ===
Semifinals
10	(Spain) **Félix Mantilla**	4	**6**	**6**
WC	(Germany) Tommy Haas	**6**	3	4
(Ukraine) **Andriy Medvedev**	**6**	**6**
2	(Russia) Yevgeny Kafelnikov	3	1

Final
10	(Spain) Félix Mantilla	0	4	2
(Ukraine) **Andriy Medvedev**	**6**	**6**	**6**

=== Top half ===
==== Section 1 ====
First round
Q	(Sweden) T Nydahl	**6**	6^{4}	5
(Germany) **A Rădulescu**	4	**7^{7}**	**7**
(Germany) M-K Goellner	4	3
WC	(Germany) **M Craca**	**6**	**6**
(Morocco) **H Arazi**	**6**	**6**
15	(Netherlands) J Siemerink	4	2
10	(Spain) **F Mantilla**	6^{2}	**6**	**6**
(Sweden) M Larsson	**7^{7}**	4	3
WC	(Germany) J Knippschild	**6**	3	3
(Spain) **R Carretero**	4	**6**	**6**
Q	(Italy) M Martelli	**6**	6^{4}	2
WC	(Germany) **N Kiefer**	4	**7^{7}**	**6**

Second round
1	(Austria) **T Muster**	**6**	**6**
(Germany) A Rădulescu	2	2
WC	(Germany) M Craca	6^{1}	5
(Morocco) **H Arazi**	**7^{7}**	**7**
10	(Spain) **F Mantilla**	**6**	**6**
(Spain) R Carretero	1	1
WC	(Germany) N Kiefer	5	2
8	(Germany) **B Becker**	**7**	**6**

Third round
1	(Austria) T Muster	1	2
(Morocco) **H Arazi**	**6**	**6**
10	(Spain) **F Mantilla**	**7^{8}**	**6**
8	(Germany) B Becker	6^{6}	2

Quarterfinals
(Morocco) H Arazi	**6**	6^{5}	4
10	(Spain) **F Mantilla**	4	**7^{7}**	**6**

==== Section 2 ====
First round
WC	(Germany) **T Haas**	**7^{9}**	**6**
(Slovakia) D Hrbatý	6^{7}	3
WC	(Germany) D Elsner	4	4
LL	(Spain) **C Costa**	**6**	**6**
(Morocco) K Alami	4	4
LL	(Germany) **O Gross**	**6**	**6**
11	(Spain) **A Berasategui**	**6**	**6**
(France) A Boetsch	2	4
(Sweden) **M Gustafsson**	**6**	1	**6**
(France) C Pioline	4	**6**	3
(Sweden) M Tillström	1	**6**	3
(Norway) **C Ruud**	**6**	4	**6**

Second round
4	(Spain) C Moyà	4	1
WC	(Germany) **T Haas**	**6**	**6**
LL	(Spain) C Costa	3	1
LL	(Germany) **O Gross**	**6**	**6**
11	(Spain) **A Berasategui**	**6**	**6**
(Sweden) M Gustafsson	1	1
(Norway) C Ruud	1	5
5	(Chile) **M Ríos**	**6**	**7**

Third round
WC	(Germany) **T Haas**	5	**7**	**6**
LL	(Germany) O Gross	**7**	5	3
11	(Spain) **A Berasategui**	**6**	**6**
5	(Chile) M Ríos	4	1

Quarterfinals
WC	(Germany) **T Haas**	2	**6**	**6**
11	(Spain) A Berasategui	**6**	2	3

=== Bottom half ===
==== Section 3 ====
First round
Q	(Spain) **A Martín**	3	**7^{7}**	**7^{7}**
Q	(Belgium) F Dewulf	**6**	6^{3}	6^{4}
(Argentina) H Gumy	3	1
(United States) **J Tarango**	**6**	**6**
(Australia) S Draper	0	4
12	(Spain) **S Bruguera**	**6**	**6**
13	(Switzerland) M Rosset	4	2
Q	(Spain) **J Díaz**	**6**	**6**
(Netherlands) **P Haarhuis**	**6**	**6**
(Germany) H Dreekmann	4	4
Q	(The Bahamas) M Knowles	5	**6**	0
(Ukraine) **A Medvedev**	**7**	4	**6**

Second round
6	(South Africa) **W Ferreira**	3	**7**	**7**
Q	(Spain) A Martín	**6**	5	5
(United States) J Tarango	**6**	3	2
12	(Spain) **S Bruguera**	4	**6**	**6**
Q	(Spain) **J Díaz**	**6**	3	**7**
(Netherlands) P Haarhuis	2	**6**	5
(Ukraine) **A Medvedev**	**6**	**6**
3	(Netherlands) R Krajicek	1	1

Third round
6	(South Africa) W Ferreira	1	3
12	(Spain) **S Bruguera**	**6**	**6**
Q	(Spain) J Díaz	3	3
(Ukraine) **A Medvedev**	**6**	**6**

Quarterfinals
12	(Spain) S Bruguera	4	6^{3}
(Ukraine) **A Medvedev**	**6**	**7^{7}**

==== Section 4 ====
First round
(Netherlands) **S Schalken**	**6**	**6**
(Spain) J Sánchez	4	2
Q	(Spain) M A Górriz	5	4
(Spain) **F Clavet**	**7**	**6**
(Germany) D Prinosil	1	3
9	(Spain) **Á Corretja**	**6**	**6**
16	(Germany) **M Stich**	**6**	**6**
(Slovakia) K Kučera	4	4
(Czech Republic) **S Doseděl**	**7^{8}**	**6**
(Italy) R Furlan	6^{6}	2
(Australia) **R Fromberg**	**7^{7}**	**6**
(Brazil) G Kuerten	6^{4}	3

Second round
7	(Spain) **Á Costa**	**6**	**7^{7}**
(Netherlands) S Schalken	3	6^{3}
(Spain) F Clavet	**6**	4	5
9	(Spain) **Á Corretja**	3	**6**	**7**
16	(Germany) M Stich	6^{2}	2
(Czech Republic) **S Doseděl**	**7^{7}**	**6**
(Australia) R Fromberg	6^{4}	6^{4}
2	(Russia) **Y Kafelnikov**	**7^{7}**	**7^{7}**

Third round
7	(Spain) **Á Costa**	**6**	**6**
9	(Spain) Á Corretja	3	4
(Czech Republic) S Doseděl	2	1
2	(Russia) **Y Kafelnikov**	**6**	**6**

Quarterfinals
7	(Spain) Á Costa	3	0
2	(Russia) **Y Kafelnikov**	**6**	**6**
