= 1991 ATP German Open =

- Date: 6–13 May
- Edition: 85th
- Category: ATP Championship Series
- Draw: 56S / 28D
- Prize money: $750,000
- Surface: Clay / outdoor
- Location: Hamburg, Germany
- Venue: Rothenbaum Tennis Center

Champions

Singles
- (Czechoslovakia) Karel Nováček

Doubles
- (Spain) Sergio Casal / (Spain) Emilio Sánchez
- ATP German Open

The 1991 German Open was a men's tennis tournament played on outdoor clay courts. It was the 85th edition of the Hamburg Masters (Hamburg Masters), and was part of the Championship Series category of the 1991 ATP Tour. It took place at the Rothenbaum Tennis Center in Hamburg, Germany, from 6 May until 13 May 1991. Karel Nováček, who was seeded 13th, won the singles title.

== Finals ==
=== Singles ===
(Czechoslovakia) Karel Nováček defeated (Sweden) Magnus Gustafsson, 6–3, 6–3, 5–7, 0–6, 6–1

- It was Karel Nováček's 2nd title of the year, and his 5th overall. It was his 1st Masters title of the year, and overall.

=== Doubles ===
(Spain) Sergio Casal / (Spain) Emilio Sánchez defeated (Brazil) Cássio Motta / (South Africa) Danie Visser, 4–6, 6–3, 6–2
