= Dirk Dier =

German tennis player (born 1972)

- Country (sports): Germany
- Residence: Blieskastel, Germany
- Born: 16 February 1972 (age 54) Sankt Ingbert, West Germany
- Height: 1.85 m (6 ft 1 in)
- Turned pro: 1990
- Plays: Right-handed
- Prize money: $388,546

Singles
- Career record: 6–18
- Career titles: 0; 5 Challenger, 0 Futures
- Highest ranking: No. 118 (22 April 1996)

Grand Slam singles results
- Australian Open: Q2 (1989, 1999)
- French Open: 1R (1996)
- Wimbledon: 1R (1990)
- US Open: 2R (1996)

Doubles
- Career record: 3–12
- Career titles: 0; 6 Challenger, 0 Futures
- Highest ranking: No. 158 (17 April 2000)

Grand Slam doubles results
- Wimbledon: Q1 (1990, 1993)

Dirk Dier (born 16 February 1972) is a former professional tennis player from Germany.

== Career ==
Dier, an under 12s and 14s national champion, was a semi finalist in the Orange Bowl. In 1990, he defeated Leander Paes to win the boys' singles event in the Australian Open and also finished runner-up in the juniors at Queen's that year. He appeared in the main draw of a Grand Slam for the first time at the 1990 Wimbledon Championships, where he lost in the opening round to countryman Michael Stich.

His other two Grand Slam appearances came in 1996. The German exited in the first round of the 1996 French Open, to Félix Mantilla in four sets, but reached the second round in the US Open, with a win over Chuck Adams. He then faced second seed Thomas Muster, who beat him in straight sets.

Dier made just one quarter-final during his career on the ATP Tour, which was in the 1996 Bermuda Open. En route he defeated two top 100 players, Michael Joyce and Nicolás Lapentti.

As of September 2019, he is the coach of Angelique Kerber.

== Junior Grand Slam finals ==
=== Singles: 1 (1 title) ===
Result	Year	Tournament	Surface	Opponent	Score
Win	1990	Australian Open	Hard	(India) Leander Paes	6–4, 7–6^{(7–4)}

== ATP Challenger and ITF Futures finals ==
=== Singles: 11 (5–6) ===
Legend ATP Challenger (5–6) ITF Futures (0–0)	Finals by surface Hard (0–0) Clay (4–4) Grass (0–0) Carpet (1–2)

Result	W–L	Date	Tournament	Tier	Surface	Opponent	Score
Win	1–0	Jul 1993	Seville, Spain	Challenger	Clay	(Mexico) Oliver Fernández	6–3, 6–3
Loss	1–1	Jun 1994	Furth, Germany	Challenger	Clay	(Belgium) Kris Goossens	7–6, 3–6, 2–6
Loss	1–2	Jun 1995	Eisenach, Germany	Challenger	Clay	(Poland) Wojtek Kowalski	6–7, 3–6
Win	2–2	Jul 1995	Seville, Spain	Challenger	Clay	(Spain) Tati Rascón	7–5, 6–2
Loss	2–3	Oct 1995	Guayaquil, Ecuador	Challenger	Clay	(Belgium) Kris Goossens	4–6, 4–6
Loss	2–4	Oct 1996	Mallorca, Spain	Challenger	Clay	(Slovakia) Dominik Hrbatý	3–6, 2–6
Loss	2–5	Feb 1997	Lippstadt, Germany	Challenger	Carpet	(Germany) Arne Thoms	6–7, 3–6
Win	3–5	Jun 1997	Weiden, Germany	Challenger	Clay	(Egypt) Tamer El Sawy	7–6, 6–3
Win	4–5	Feb 1998	Lippstadt, Germany	Challenger	Carpet	(Italy) Marzio Martelli	7–6, 4–3 ret.
Loss	4–6	Feb 1998	Wolfsburg, Germany	Challenger	Carpet	(Switzerland) Ivo Heuberger	7–6, 4–6, 4–6
Win	5–6	May 1998	Dresden, Germany	Challenger	Clay	(Germany) Markus Hantschk	0–6, 6–1, 6–4

=== Doubles: 16 (6–10) ===
Legend ATP Challenger (6–9) ITF Futures (0–1)	Finals by surface Hard (1–1) Clay (2–3) Grass (0–0) Carpet (3–6)

Result	W–L	Date	Tournament	Tier	Surface	Partner	Opponents	Score
Loss	0–1	Dec 1993	Hong Kong, Hong Kong	Challenger	Hard	(Germany) Alexander Mronz	(United States) Tommy Ho (Japan) Shuzo Matsuoka	3–2 ret.
Loss	0–2	Feb 1995	Wolfsburg, Germany	Challenger	Carpet	(Germany) Lars Koslowski	(Germany) Martin Sinner (Netherlands) Joost Winnink	5–7, 3–6
Win	1–2	May 1995	Jerusalem, Israel	Challenger	Hard	(Germany) Christian Saceanu	(France) Lionel Barthez (Germany) Patrick Baur	7–6, 7–6
Win	2–2	Jun 1995	Weiden, Germany	Challenger	Clay	(Germany) Lars Koslowski	(Australia) Brent Larkham (Spain) Emilio Benfele Álvarez	6–3, 6–3
Win	3–2	Jun 1995	Eisenach, Germany	Challenger	Clay	(Germany) Lars Koslowski	(Canada) Sébastien Leblanc (United States) Chris Woodruff	3–6, 6–3, 7–6
Win	4–2	Feb 1996	Wolfsburg, Germany	Challenger	Carpet	(Germany) Arne Thoms	(United States) Jim Pugh (Netherlands) Joost Winnink	6–4, 6–4
Loss	4–3	Dec 1997	Bad Lippspringe, Germany	Challenger	Carpet	(Germany) Lars Koslowski	(Finland) Tuomas Ketola (Germany) Michael Kohlmann	6–4, 3–6, 5–7
Loss	4–4	Jul 1998	Ulm, Germany	Challenger	Clay	(Germany) Michael Kohlmann	(Brazil) Márcio Carlsson (Brazil) Jaime Oncins	4–6, 7–6, 3–6
Loss	4–5	Feb 1999	Wolfsburg, Germany	Challenger	Carpet	(Germany) Karsten Braasch	(Brazil) Adriano Ferreira (Venezuela) Maurice Ruah	walkover
Loss	4–6	Mar 1999	Magdeburg, Germany	Challenger	Carpet	(Germany) Jan-Ralph Brandt	(Australia) Michael Hill (Australia) Andrew Painter	6–7, 7–6, 6–7
Loss	4–7	Jun 1999	Eisenach, Germany	Challenger	Clay	(Germany) Marcus Hilpert	(United States) Mitch Sprengelmeyer (South Africa) Jason Weir-Smith	3–6, 1–6
Loss	4–8	Jul 1999	Ulm, Germany	Challenger	Clay	(Germany) Michael Kohlmann	(Australia) Andrew Painter (South Africa) Byron Talbot	3–6, 4–6
Win	5–8	Dec 1999	Nümbrecht, Germany	Challenger	Carpet	(Germany) Jens Knippschild	(Germany) Andreas Tattermusch (Germany) Andreas Weber	6–3, 7–5
Loss	5–9	Feb 2000	Lübeck, Germany	Challenger	Carpet	(Germany) Karsten Braasch	(Italy) Giorgio Galimberti (Italy) Diego Nargiso	4–6, 4–6
Win	6–9	Mar 2000	Magdeburg, Germany	Challenger	Carpet	(Germany) Karsten Braasch	(Germany) Tomas Behrend (Germany) Michael Kohlmann	7–5, 7–6^{(8–6)}
Loss	6–10	Oct 2000	France F21, Forbach	Futures	Carpet	(Germany) Bjorn Jacob	(Germany) Matthias A. Muller (Germany) Andreas Tattermusch	3–6, 6–7^{(4–7)}

== Performance timeline ==
Key
W	F	SF	QF	#R	RR	Q#	DNQ	A	NH

(W) winner; (F) finalist; (SF) semifinalist; (QF) quarterfinalist; (#R) rounds 4, 3, 2, 1; (RR) round-robin stage; (Q#) qualification round; (DNQ) did not qualify; (A) absent; (NH) not held; (SR) strike rate (events won / competed); (W–L) win–loss record.

=== Singles ===
Tournament	1989	1990	1991	1992	1993	1994	1995	1996	1997	1998	1999	SR	W–L	Win %
Grand Slam tournaments
Australian Open	Q2	A	A	A	A	A	A	A	A	Q1	Q2	0 / 0	0–0	–
French Open	A	A	A	A	Q1	Q3	A	1R	Q3	Q1	Q1	0 / 1	0–1	0%
Wimbledon	A	1R	A	A	Q2	A	A	A	A	A	A	0 / 1	0–1	0%
US Open	A	A	A	A	A	A	A	2R	Q3	A	A	0 / 1	1–1	50%
Win–loss	0–0	0–1	0–0	0–0	0–0	0–0	0–0	1–2	0–0	0–0	0–0	0 / 3	1–3	25%
ATP Masters Series
Indian Wells	A	A	A	A	A	Q3	A	Q1	A	A	A	0 / 0	0–0	–
Miami	A	A	A	A	A	A	A	1R	Q1	A	A	0 / 1	0–1	0%
Monte Carlo	A	A	A	A	Q2	Q2	Q2	A	A	A	A	0 / 0	0–0	–
Hamburg	A	A	A	A	2R	Q3	A	A	Q1	Q2	A	0 / 1	1–1	50%
Paris	A	A	A	A	A	Q1	A	Q1	A	A	A	0 / 0	0–0	–
Win–loss	0–0	0–0	0–0	0–0	1–1	0–0	0–0	0–1	0–0	0–0	0–0	0 / 2	1–2	33%
