= 1993 ATP German Open =

- Date: 3–10 May
- Edition: 87th
- Category: Championship Series, Single Week
- Draw: 56S / 28D
- Prize money: $1,450,000
- Surface: Clay / outdoor
- Location: Hamburg, Germany
- Venue: Rothenbaum Tennis Center

Champions

Singles
- (Germany) Michael Stich

Doubles
- (Netherlands) Paul Haarhuis / (Netherlands) Mark Koevermans
| ← 1992 · | ATP German Open | · 1994 → |

The 1993 German Open was a men's tennis tournament played on outdoor clay courts. It was the 87th Hamburg Masters, and was part of the ATP Championship Series, Single Week category of the 1993 ATP Tour. It took place at the Rothenbaum Tennis Center in Hamburg, Germany, from 3 May through 10 May 1993. Sixth-seeded Michael Stich won the singles title.

== Finals ==
=== Singles ===
(Germany) Michael Stich defeated (Russia) Andrei Chesnokov, 6–3, 6–7, 7–6, 6–4

- It was Stich's second title of the year, and his ninth overall. It was his first Masters title of the year, and overall.

=== Doubles ===
(Netherlands) Paul Haarhuis / (Netherlands) Mark Koevermans defeated (Canada) Grant Connell / (United States) Patrick Galbraith, 7–6, 6–4
