= 1994 ATP German Open – Singles =

Singles
- 1994 ATP German Open

Final
- Champion: (Ukraine) Andriy Medvedev
- Runner-up: (Russia) Yevgeny Kafelnikov
- Score: 6–4, 6–4, 3–6, 6–3

Details
- Draw: 56
- Seeds: 16

Events
Singles	Doubles
← 1993 ·	ATP German Open	· 1995 →

Andriy Medvedev defeated Yevgeny Kafelnikov in the final, 6–4, 6–4, 3–6, 6–3 to win the singles tennis title at the 1994 Hamburg European Open.

Michael Stich was the defending champion, but was defeated by Kafelnikov in the semifinals.

== Seeds ==
A champion seed is indicated in bold text while text in italics indicates the round in which that seed was eliminated.

1. (Germany) Michael Stich (semifinals)
2. (Sweden) Stefan Edberg (second round)
3. (Croatia) Goran Ivanišević (second round)
4. (Ukraine) **Andriy Medvedev (champion)**
5. (Sweden) Magnus Gustafsson (quarterfinals)
6. (Austria) Thomas Muster (third round)
7. (Germany) Boris Becker (second round)
8. (Czech Republic) Petr Korda (third round)
9. (Spain) Carlos Costa (quarterfinals)
10. (Switzerland) Marc Rosset (first round)
11. (Netherlands) Richard Krajicek (quarterfinals)
12. (Russia) Alexander Volkov (first round)
13. (United States) Ivan Lendl (first round)
14. (Netherlands) Paul Haarhuis (third round)
15. (Spain) Alberto Berasategui (first round)
16. (Russia) Andrei Chesnokov (third round)

== Draw ==
=== Key ===
- Q = Qualifier
- WC = Wild card
- LL = Lucky loser
- Alt = Alternate
- SE = Special exempt
- PR = Protected ranking
- ITF = ITF entry
- JE = Junior exempt
- w/o = Walkover
- r = Retired
- d = Defaulted
- SR = Special ranking
- NB: The Final was the best of 5 sets.

=== Finals ===
Semifinals
1	(Germany) Michael Stich	3	4
(Russia) **Yevgeny Kafelnikov**	**6**	**6**
4	(Ukraine) **Andriy Medvedev**	**6**	**6**
(Spain) Javier Sánchez	4	1

Final
(Russia) Yevgeny Kafelnikov	4	4	**6**	3
4	(Ukraine) **Andriy Medvedev**	**6**	**6**	3	**6**

=== Top half ===
==== Section 1 ====
First round
(Spain) **E Sánchez**	1	**7**	**6**
(United States) A Krickstein	**6**	5	4
Q	(Sweden) **J Apell**	3	**7^{7}**	**6**
(Argentina) H de la Peña	**6**	6^{5}	3
(Russia) A Cherkasov	4	2
16	(Russia) **A Chesnokov**	**6**	**6**
9	(Spain) **C Costa**	**6**	**7^{7}**
Q	(France) T Champion	4	6^{0}
(Czech Republic) K Nováček	3	5
(Czech Republic) **S Doseděl**	**6**	**7**
WC	(Germany) H Dreekmann	2	**6**	2
(Spain) **Á Corretja**	**6**	4	**6**

Second round
1	(Germany) **M Stich**	6^{4}	**6**	**6**
(Spain) E Sánchez	**7^{7}**	3	4
Q	(Sweden) J Apell	4	2
16	(Russia) **A Chesnokov**	**6**	**6**
9	(Spain) **C Costa**	**7**	**6**
(Czech Republic) S Doseděl	5	4
(Spain) **Á Corretja**	**6**	5	**7**
7/WC	(Germany) B Becker	1	**7**	5

Third round
1	(Germany) **M Stich**	**6**	**6**
16	(Russia) A Chesnokov	0	4
9	(Spain) **C Costa**	**6**	**6**
(Spain) Á Corretja	2	0

Quarterfinals
1	(Germany) **M Stich**	**6**	6^{3}	**6**
9	(Spain) C Costa	4	**7^{7}**	4

==== Section 2 ====
First round
(Russia) **Y Kafelnikov**	6^{6}	**6**	**7**
(Austria) G Schaller	**7^{8}**	4	5
(Canada) G Rusedski	6^{7}	6^{5}
(Russia) **A Olhovskiy**	**7^{9}**	**7^{7}**
(Germany) **K Braasch**	**6**	**6**
WC/13	(United States) I Lendl	1	4
11	(Netherlands) **R Krajicek**	**6**	**6**
(Sweden) H Holm	4	4
(Italy) **R Furlan**	1	**7**	**6**
(Spain) J Arrese	**6**	5	2
(France) R Gilbert	6^{5}	3
WC	(Germany) **J Renzenbrink**	**7^{7}**	**6**

Second round
3	(Croatia) G Ivanišević	6^{1}	0
(Russia) **Y Kafelnikov**	**7^{7}**	**6**
(Russia) A Olhovskiy	4	0
(Germany) **K Braasch**	**6**	**6**
11	(Netherlands) **R Krajicek**	**6**	**7^{9}**
(Italy) R Furlan	3	6^{7}
WC	(Germany) J Renzenbrink	**6**	3	3
6	(Austria) **T Muster**	3	**6**	**6**

Third round
(Russia) **Y Kafelnikov**	**6**	**6**
(Germany) K Braasch	3	2
11	(Netherlands) **R Krajicek**	**6**	**6**
6	(Austria) T Muster	4	4

Quarterfinals
(Russia) **Y Kafelnikov**	**6**	**6**
11	(Netherlands) R Krajicek	3	2

=== Bottom half ===
==== Section 3 ====
First round
(Czech Republic) D Vacek	3	6^{4}
Q	(Germany) **M Naewie**	**6**	**7^{7}**
(Germany) M-K Goellner	3	3
(France) **H Leconte**	**6**	**6**
WC	(Germany) **P Kühnen**	**6**	3	**6**
12	(Russia) A Volkov	4	**6**	3
14	(Netherlands) **P Haarhuis**	**6**	**6**
(Germany) C-U Steeb	0	3
Q	(France) T Guardiola	**7^{8}**	2	3
Q	(Italy) **D Nargiso**	6^{6}	**6**	**6**
(Israel) A Mansdorf	6^{3}	4
(Germany) **B Karbacher**	**7^{7}**	**6**

Second round
5	(Sweden) **M Gustafsson**	**6**	**6**
Q	(Germany) M Naewie	0	1
(France) **H Leconte**	**6**	**6**
WC	(Germany) P Kühnen	3	2
14	(Netherlands) **P Haarhuis**	**6**	**6**
Q	(Italy) D Nargiso	2	2
(Germany) B Karbacher	2	3
4	(Ukraine) **A Medvedev**	**6**	**6**

Third round
5	(Sweden) **M Gustafsson**	**7**	5	**6**
(France) H Leconte	5	**7**	4
14	(Netherlands) P Haarhuis	**6**	2	2
4	(Ukraine) **A Medvedev**	2	**6**	**6**

Quarterfinals
5	(Sweden) M Gustafsson	4	**6**	1
4	(Ukraine) **A Medvedev**	**6**	4	**6**

==== Section 4 ====
First round
(Spain) **J Burillo**	**6**	**6**
Q	(Germany) R Kroll	4	3
(Spain) **J Sánchez**	**6**	3	**7**
(Australia) R Fromberg	2	**6**	5
(Italy) **S Pescosolido**	**7^{7}**	**6**
10	(Switzerland) M Rosset	6^{2}	3
15	(Spain) A Berasategui	**6**	3	2
(Sweden) **M Larsson**	4	**6**	**6**
Q	(Germany) T Theine	3	5
(Netherlands) **J Eltingh**	**6**	**7**
(Sweden) N Kulti	**6**	2	6^{8}
(Peru) **J Yzaga**	2	**6**	**7^{10}**

Second round
8	(Czech Republic) **P Korda**	**6**	3	**6**
(Spain) J Burillo	3	**6**	2
(Spain) **J Sánchez**	**6**	4	**6**
(Italy) S Pescosolido	3	**6**	3
(Sweden) M Larsson	6^{7}	5
(Netherlands) **J Eltingh**	**7^{9}**	**7**
(Peru) **J Yzaga**	**6**	**7**
2	(Sweden) S Edberg	4	5

Third round
8	(Czech Republic) P Korda	6^{7}	4
(Spain) **J Sánchez**	**7^{9}**	**6**
(Netherlands) **J Eltingh**	2	**7**	**6**
(Peru) J Yzaga	**6**	5	4

Quarterfinals
(Spain) **J Sánchez**	**6**	**6**
(Netherlands) J Eltingh	4	2
