= Lars Koslowski =

German tennis player

- Country (sports): West Germany (1989-1990); Germany (1990-)
- Residence: Vellmar, Germany
- Born: 22 May 1971 (age 54); Kassel, West Germany
- Height: 1.88 m (6 ft 2 in)
- Turned pro: 1989
- Plays: Right-handed
- Prize money: $265,437

Singles
- Career record: 17–28
- Career titles: 0
- Highest ranking: No. 63 (15 June 1992)

Grand Slam singles results
- Australian Open: 3R (1992)
- French Open: 1R (1992)
- Wimbledon: 1R (1992)

Lars Koslowski (born 22 May 1971) is a former professional tennis player from Germany.

== Career ==
Koslowski, who was coached by Karl Meiler, reached the third round of Men's Singles in the 1992 Australian Open. He defeated former world number five Jimmy Arias in three sets in the opening round, which he followed up with a win in four sets over Italian Paolo Canè. The right handed player was then eliminated in straight sets by the 15th seed David Wheaton 4–6, 3–6, 3–6.

He was runner-up in the Men's Doubles at the 1992 Croatia Open, which partner Sander Groen, which was his best performance in an ATP Tour event.

== ATP career finals ==
=== Doubles: 1 (0–1) ===
Result	W/L	Date	Tournament	Surface	Partner	Opponents	Score
Loss	0–1	Aug 1992	Umag, Croatia	Clay	(Netherlands) Sander Groen	(Germany) David Prinosil (Czechoslovakia) Richard Vogel	3–6, 7–6, 6–7

== Challenger titles ==
=== Singles: (3) ===
No.	Year	Tournament	Surface	Opponent	Score
1.	1991	Sevilla, Spain	Clay	(Sweden) Tomas Nydahl	6–2, 3–6, 7–6
2.	1991	Reggio Calabria, Italy	Clay	(Croatia) Saša Hiršzon	6–4, 6–2
3.	1992	Merano, Italy	Clay	(Argentina) Roberto Azar	6–3, 6–4

=== Doubles: (5) ===
No.	Year	Tournament	Surface	Partner	Opponents	Score
1.	1991	Bucharest, Romania	Clay	(Sweden) Tomas Nydahl	(Romania) George Cosac (Romania) Florin Segărceanu	6–3, 2–6, 6–3
2.	1991	Brest, France	Hard	(Germany) Arne Thoms	(Germany) Patrik Kühnen (Germany) Alexander Mronz	6–2, 1–6, 6–3
3.	1992	Halle, Germany	Clay	(Germany) Karsten Braasch	(New Zealand) Kelly Evernden (New Zealand) Brett Steven	4–6, 7–6, 6–0
4.	1995	Weiden, Germany	Clay	(Germany) Dirk Dier	(Spain) Emilio Benfele Álvarez (Australia) Brent Larkham	6–3, 6–3
5.	1995	Eisenach, Germany	Clay	(Germany) Dirk Dier	(Canada) Sébastien Leblanc (United States) Chris Woodruff	3–6, 6–3, 7–6
