= Červené Dřevo =

Coordinates: 49°17′47″N 13°2′46″E

Červené Dřevo (German: Rothenbaum) is a hamlet in Chudenín in Klatovy District in the Plzeň Region of the Czech Republic.

== Geography ==
Červené Dřevo is located about 20 km (12 mi) southwest of Klatovy, about 1 km east of the border with Germany. It is situated in Fleky part of the municipality of Chudenín.

== History ==
Červené Dřevo (under its German name Rothenbaum) was founded after the Thirty Years' War (mid-17th century). Situated in the historical region of Sudetenland, it was inhabited by Sudeten Germans. The church was founded in 1680. In 1880, the settlement consisted of ten houses.

From the revolution in 1848 until World War I, Červené Dřevo/Rothenbaum was a separate municipality, and included also the nearby village of Fleky. After the war, Fleky became a municipality and Červené Dřevo was attached to it. Following the expulsion of Germans from Czechoslovakia after World War II, the village was deserted and destroyed, and Czechoslovak border fortifications during the Cold War were installed. The locality then fell under the administration of the municipality of Chudenín.

== Sights ==
The Church of Our Lady of Sorrows used to be in the village. It was burned in 1953 and the ruins were demolished shortly after. In the early 1990s, the expellees erected a memorial in the ruins of the church.
