= 1992 Maceió Open – Doubles =

Doubles
- 1992 Maceió Open

Final
- Champions: (Argentina) Gabriel Markus (United States) John Sobel
- Runners-up: (Brazil) Ricardo Acioly (Brazil) Mauro Menezes
- Score: 6–4, 1–6, 7–5

Events
Singles	Doubles
Maceió Open

Gabriel Markus and John Sobel won in the final 6–4, 1–6, 7–5 against Ricardo Acioly and Mauro Menezes.

== Seeds ==
Champion seeds are indicated in bold text while text in italics indicates the round in which those seeds were eliminated.

1. (Brazil) Luiz Mattar / (Brazil) Jaime Oncins (first round)
2. (Argentina) Christian Miniussi / (Uruguay) Diego Pérez (semifinals)
3. (Argentina) Gustavo Luza / (Venezuela) Nicolás Pereira (quarterfinals)
4. (Argentina) Horacio de la Peña / (Brazil) Cássio Motta (quarterfinals)

== Draw ==
=== Key ===
- Q = Qualifier
- WC = Wild card
- LL = Lucky loser
- Alt = Alternate
- ITF = ITF entry
- PR = Protected ranking
- SR = Special ranking
- SE = Special exempt
- JE = Junior exempt
- JR = Junior Accelerator Programme entrant
- CO = College Accelerator Programme entrant
- NG = Next Gen Accelerator Program entrant
- w/o = Walkover
- r = Retired
- d = Defaulted

First round
1	(Brazil) L Mattar (Brazil) J Oncins	4	6
(Brazil) **N Aerts** (Brazil) **D Marcelino**	**6**	**7**
(Argentina) **G Markus** (United States) **J Sobel**	**6**	**6**
Q	(Mexico) O Fernández (Mexico) L Herrera	2	3
3	(Argentina) **G Luza** (Venezuela) **N Pereira**	**6**	**6**
(Portugal) J Cunha Silva (Brazil) F Roese	3	4
LL	(Argentina) N Becerra (Argentina) F Yunis	3	5
(Spain) **T Carbonell** (Spain) **F Roig**	**6**	**7**
(Brazil) **R Acioly** (Brazil) **M Menezes**	**6**	**6**
(United States) F Montana (Argentina) D Orsanic	3	4
LL	(Brazil) W Kyriakos (Brazil) F Meligeni	4	3
4	(Argentina) **H de la Peña** (Brazil) **C Motta**	**6**	**6**
(Argentina) **G Garetto** (Argentina) **M Ingaramo**	**6**	**6**
WC	(Brazil) M Hocevar (Brazil) A Hocevar	0	1
(Peru) P Arraya (Mexico) G Martínez	**6**	2	5
2	(Argentina) **C Miniussi** (Uruguay) **D Pérez**	1	**6**	**7**

Quarterfinals
(Brazil) N Aerts (Brazil) D Marcelino	**6**	6	6
(Argentina) **G Markus** (United States) **J Sobel**	4	**7**	**7**
3	(Argentina) G Luza (Venezuela) N Pereira	4	6
(Spain) **T Carbonell** (Spain) **F Roig**	**6**	**7**
(Brazil) **R Acioly** (Brazil) **M Menezes**	**7**	**7**
4	(Argentina) H de la Peña (Brazil) C Motta	5	6
(Argentina) G Garetto (Argentina) M Ingaramo	4	1
2	(Argentina) **C Miniussi** (Uruguay) **D Pérez**	**6**	**6**

Semifinals
(Argentina) **G Markus** (United States) **J Sobel**	**7**	**7**
(Spain) T Carbonell (Spain) F Roig	6	6
(Brazil) **R Acioly** (Brazil) **M Menezes**	**7**	**6**
2	(Argentina) C Miniussi (Uruguay) D Pérez	6	4

Final
(Argentina) **G Markus** (United States) **J Sobel**	**6**	1	**7**
(Brazil) R Acioly (Brazil) M Menezes	4	**6**	5
