= 1992 Maceió Open =

- Date: 3–10 February
- Edition: Only
- Category: World Series (Free Week)
- Draw: 32S / 16D
- Prize money: $130,000
- Surface: Clay / outdoor
- Location: Maceió, Brazil
- Venue: Praia da Pajuçara

Champions

Singles
- (Spain) Tomás Carbonell

Doubles
- (Argentina) Gabriel Markus / (United States) John Sobel
- Maceió Open

The 1992 Maceió Open (a.k.a. Chevrolet Classic or Chevrolet Open) was an ATP tournament played on clay courts. It was the only edition of the Maceió Open and was part of the ATP World Series of the 1992 ATP Tour. It was held in Maceió, Brazil at Praia da Pajuçara, from 3 February through 10 February 1992.

== Finals ==
=== Singles ===
(Spain) Tomás Carbonell defeated (Argentina) Christian Miniussi 7–6^{(14–12)}, 5–7, 6–2

- It was Carbonell's 1st title of the year and the 7th of his career.

=== Doubles ===
(Argentina) Gabriel Markus / (United States) John Sobel defeated (Brazil) Ricardo Acioly / (Brazil) Mauro Menezes 6–4, 1–6, 7–5

- It was Markus' 1st title of the year and the 1st of his career. It was Sobel's only title of the year and the 1st of his career.
