= 1992 Maceió Open – Singles =

Singles
- 1992 Maceió Open

Final
- Champion: (Spain) Tomás Carbonell
- Runner-up: (Argentina) Christian Miniussi
- Score: 7–6^{(14–12)}, 5–7, 6–2

Details
- Draw: 32
- Seeds: 8

Events
Singles	Doubles
Maceió Open

Tomás Carbonell won in the final 7–6^{(14–12)}, 5–7, 6–2 against Christian Miniussi.

== Seeds ==
A champion seed is indicated in bold text while text in italics indicates the round in which that seed was eliminated.

1. (Argentina) Martín Jaite (quarterfinals)
2. n/a
3. n/a
4. (Argentina) Gabriel Markus (quarterfinals)
5. (Brazil) Jaime Oncins (first round)
6. (Argentina) Christian Miniussi (final)
7. (Argentina) Roberto Azar (second round)
8. (Spain) **Tomás Carbonell (champion)**

== Draw ==
=== Key ===
- Q = Qualifier
- WC = Wild card
- LL = Lucky loser
- Alt = Alternate
- ITF = ITF entry
- PR = Protected ranking
- SR = Special ranking
- SE = Special exempt
- JE = Junior exempt
- JR = Junior Accelerator Programme entrant
- CO = College Accelerator Programme entrant
- NG = Next Gen Accelerator Program entrant
- w/o = Walkover
- r = Retired
- d = Defaulted

First round
1	(Argentina) **M Jaite**	**6**	**6**
Q	(Argentina) D Orsanic	4	3
(Brazil) D Marcelino	4	4
(Peru) **P Arraya**	**6**	**6**
Q	(Brazil) J P Etchecoin	**6**	3	2
(Spain) **F Roig**	3	**6**	**6**
(United States) F Montana	3	2
7	(Argentina) **R Azar**	**6**	**6**
4	(Argentina) **G Markus**	**6**	**7**
(Argentina) H de la Peña	4	5
(Uruguay) M Filippini	3	6^{7}
WC	(Brazil) **C Motta**	**6**	**7^{9}**
Q	(Uruguay) D Pérez	6^{7}	3
(Portugal) **N Marques**	**7^{9}**	**6**
(Canada) M Wostenholme	4	**6**	2
6	(Argentina) **C Miniussi**	**6**	1	**6**
5	(Brazil) J Oncins	6^{6}	**7**	1
(Brazil) **L Mattar**	**7^{8}**	5	**6**
(Mexico) **O Fernandez**	**6**	4	**7^{7}**
(Venezuela) N Pereira	1	**6**	6^{2}
(Portugal) J Cunha Silva	2	1
WC	(Brazil) **F Meligeni**	**6**	**6**
(United States) **C Garner**	**6**	2	**6**
LL	(Argentina) N Becerra	4	**6**	4
8	(Spain) **T Carbonell**	**6**	**6**
(United States) J Brown	1	0
Q	(Argentina) **M Ingaramo**	**6**	**6**
(Brazil) F Roese	0	4
WC	(Brazil) J Daher	3	**6**	4
(Argentina) **F Davín**	**6**	0	**6**
(Mexico) **L Herrera**	**7^{7}**	**6**
LL	(Argentina) F Yunis	6^{4}	4

Second round
1	(Argentina) **M Jaite**	**6**	**6**
(Peru) P Arraya	3	2
(Spain) **F Roig**	**6**	**6**
7	(Argentina) R Azar	3	3
4	(Argentina) **G Markus**	**6**	**6**
WC	(Brazil) C Motta	3	1
(Portugal) N Marques	5	2
6	(Argentina) **C Miniussi**	**7**	**6**
(Brazil) **L Mattar**	1	**7**	**6**
(Mexico) O Fernandez	**6**	5	3
WC	(Brazil) **F Meligeni**	**6**	**6**
(United States) C Garner	3	4
8	(Spain) **T Carbonell**	**6**	**2**
Q	(Argentina) M Ingaramo	4	0	r
(Argentina) **F Davín**	5	**7**	**6**
(Mexico) L Herrera	**7**	5	3

Quarterfinals
1	(Argentina) M Jaite	2	2
(Spain) **F Roig**	**6**	**6**
4	(Argentina) G Markus	2	3
6	(Argentina) **C Miniussi**	**6**	**6**
(Brazil) **L Mattar**	3	**6**	**6**
WC	(Brazil) F Meligeni	**6**	3	2
8	(Spain) **T Carbonell**	**6**	5	**6**
(Argentina) F Davín	2	**7**	2

Semifinals
(Spain) F Roig	**6**	5	4
6	(Argentina) **C Miniussi**	3	**7**	**6**
(Brazil) L Mattar	4	5
8	(Spain) **T Carbonell**	**6**	**7**

Final
6	(Argentina) Christian Miniussi	6^{12}	**7**	2
8	(Spain) **Tomás Carbonell**	**7^{14}**	5	**6**
