= 1992 Lipton International Players Championships – Men's singles =

Men's singles
- 1992 Lipton International Players Championships

Final
- Champion: (United States) Michael Chang
- Runner-up: (Argentina) Alberto Mancini
- Score: 7–5, 7–5

Events
Singles	men	women
Doubles	men	women
← 1991 ·	Lipton International Players Championships	· 1993 →

Michael Chang defeated Alberto Mancini in the final, 7–5, 7–5 to win the men's singles tennis title at the 1992 Miami Open. With the win, he completed the Sunshine Double.

Jim Courier was the defending champion, but lost in the semifinals to Chang.

== Seeds ==
All seeds receive a bye into the second round.

1. (United States) Jim Courier (semifinals)
2. (Sweden) Stefan Edberg (third round)
3. (Germany) Boris Becker (fourth round)
4. (United States) Pete Sampras (quarterfinals)
5. (Croatia) Goran Ivanišević (third round)
6. (United States) Michael Chang (champion)
7. (Czechoslovakia) Petr Korda (third round)
8. (Spain) Emilio Sánchez (third round)
9. (Spain) Sergi Bruguera (third round)
10. (Czechoslovakia) Karel Nováček (second round)
11. (United States) Andre Agassi (second round)
12. (United States) David Wheaton (second round)
13. (Sweden) Magnus Gustafsson (second round)
14. (United States) Derrick Rostagno (third round)
15. (Commonwealth of Independent States) Andrei Chesnokov (second round)
16. (United States) Brad Gilbert (second round)
17. (Switzerland) Jakob Hlasek (semifinals)
18. (Spain) Francisco Clavet (third round)
19. (South Africa) Wayne Ferreira (second round)
20. (Argentina) Alberto Mancini (final)
21. (Croatia) Goran Prpić (third round)
22. (Netherlands) Richard Krajicek (quarterfinals)
23. (United States) MaliVai Washington (second round)
24. (Israel) Amos Mansdorf (second round)
25. (Commonwealth of Independent States) Andrei Cherkasov (quarterfinals)
26. (United States) Aaron Krickstein (second round)
27. (Spain) Javier Sánchez (second round)
28. (United States) John McEnroe (fourth round)
29. (Netherlands) Paul Haarhuis (third round)
30. (United States) Jimmy Connors (third round)
31. (United States) Richey Reneberg (second round, retired)
32. (Austria) Horst Skoff (second round)

== Draw ==
=== Key ===
- Q = Qualifier
- WC = Wild card
- LL = Lucky loser
- Alt = Alternate
- ITF = ITF entry
- PR = Protected ranking
- SR = Special ranking
- SE = Special exempt
- JE = Junior exempt
- JR = Junior Accelerator Programme entrant
- CO = College Accelerator Programme entrant
- NG = Next Gen Accelerator Program entrant
- w/o = Walkover
- r = Retired
- d = Defaulted

=== Finals ===
Quarterfinals
1	(United States) Jim Courier	6^{8}	6	6
(Italy) Diego Nargiso	7^{10}	2	0
4	(United States) Pete Sampras	4	6^{4}
6	(United States) Michael Chang	6	7^{7}
22	(Netherlands) Richard Krajicek	4	7^{8}	5
20	(Argentina) Alberto Mancini	6	6^{6}	7
25	(Commonwealth of Independent States) Andrei Cherkasov	7^{7}	3	4
17	(Switzerland) Jakob Hlasek	6^{1}	6	6

Semifinals
1	(United States) Jim Courier	2	4
6	(United States) Michael Chang	6	6
20	(Argentina) Alberto Mancini	7^{7}	7
17	(Switzerland) Jakob Hlasek	6^{4}	5

Finals
6	(United States) Michael Chang	7	7
20	(Argentina) Alberto Mancini	5	5

=== Top half ===
==== Section 1 ====
First round
(France) T Champion	4	6	6
(Argentina) C Miniussi	6	3	4
Q	(South Africa) M Ondruska	4	3
(Ecuador) A Gómez	6	6
(United States) K Curren	6	3
(Germany) C Saceanu	4	0^{r}
(Germany) C Steeb	7^{7}	4	6
(Spain) C Costa	6^{5}	6	3

Second round
1	(United States) J Courier	5	6	6
(France) T Champion	7	1	2
(Ecuador) A Gómez	6	6
32	(Austria) H Skoff	3	4
18	(Spain) F Clavet	2	6	6
(United States) K Curren	6	2	2
(Germany) C Steeb	4	6	6
15	(Commonwealth of Independent States) A Chesnokov	6	2	3

Third round
1	(United States) J Courier	6	6^{6}	4
Q	(Ecuador) A Gómez	4	7^{8}	3^{r}
18	(Spain) F Clavet	1	6^{10}
(Germany) C Steeb	6	7^{12}

Fourth round
1	(United States) J Courier	7^{7}	6
(Germany) C Steeb	6^{5}	2

==== Section 2 ====
First round
Q	(United States) J Brown	5	3
(United States) J Grabb	7	6
(Brazil) D Marcelino	4	3
Q	(United States) J Stark	6	6
(Italy) D Nargiso	7	7
Q	(Germany) C Arriens	5	5
(France) JP Fleurian	3	4
(United States) C Adams	6	6

Second round
9	(Spain) S Bruguera	6	6
(United States) J Grabb	4	2
Q	(United States) J Stark	3	7^{7}	6
23	(United States) M Washington	6	6^{4}	1
26	(United States) A Krickstein	5	3
(Italy) D Nargiso	7	6
(United States) C Adams	5	6	3
7	(Czech Republic) P Korda	7	4	6

Third round
9	(Spain) S Bruguera	3	4
Q	(United States) J Stark	6	6
(Italy) D Nargiso	6	7^{7}
7	(Czech Republic) P Korda	2	6^{2}

Fourth round
Q	(United States) J Stark	5	4
(Italy) D Nargiso	7	6

==== Section 3 ====
First round
(Japan) S Matsuoka	6	6
(Netherlands) M Schapers	4	2
(Spain) T Carbonell	7	6
(Germany) P Kühnen	5	3
(Australia) W Masur	4	7^{7}	6
(Mexico) L Lavalle	6	6^{5}	2
(United States) J Tarango	6	3	4
(Italy) G Pozzi	3	6	6

Second round
4	(United States) P Sampras	4	7^{7}	6
(Japan) S Matsuoka	6	6^{3}	1
(Spain) T Carbonell	7^{8}	2	6^{0}
30	(United States) J Connors	6^{6}	6	7^{7}
19	(South Africa) W Ferreira	3	3
(Australia) W Masur	6	6
(Italy) G Pozzi	4	6	6^{7}
14	(United States) D Rostagno	6	2	7^{9}

Third round
4	(United States) P Sampras	6	6
30	(United States) J Connors	3	2
(Australia) W Masur	6^{4}	7^{7}	6
14	(United States) D Rostagno	7^{7}	6^{1}	3

Fourth round
4	(United States) P Sampras	7^{7}	4	6
(Australia) W Masur	6^{3}	6	2

==== Section 4 ====
First round
(Germany) A Mronz	4	6	1
(Germany) M Zoecke	6	4	6
(France) F Fontang	6	6
Q	(United States) J Sobel	2	1
(Switzerland) M Rosset	7	6
(South Africa) C van Rensburg	5	3
Q	(India) R Krishnan	7^{7}	6
(Argentina) M Jaite	6^{3}	2

Second round
12	(United States) D Wheaton	1	2
(Germany) M Zoecke	6	6
(France) F Fontang	3	0^{r}
21	(Croatia) G Prpić	6	2
27	(Spain) J Sánchez	3	6	6^{3}
(Switzerland) M Rosset	6	3	7^{7}
Q	(India) R Krishnan	3	1
6	(United States) M Chang	6	6

Third round
(Germany) M Zoecke	6	6
21	(Croatia) G Prpić	1	4
(Switzerland) M Rosset	6	3	6^{0}
6	(United States) M Chang	4	6	7^{7}

Fourth round
(Germany) M Zoecke	6	3	1
6	(United States) M Chang	4	6	6

=== Bottom half ===
==== Section 5 ====
First round
Q	(Germany) B Karbacher	7^{7}	7^{9}
(Canada) G Connell	6^{2}	6^{7}
WC	(Australia) S Stolle	7	6
WC	(United States) B Dunn	5	4
(Finland) V Paloheimo	7^{7}	6^{6}	4
(Israel) G Bloom	6^{2}	7^{8}	6
(United States) B Shelton	7^{7}	7
(Italy) P Canè	6^{5}	5

Second round
5	(Croatia) G Ivanišević	6	6
Q	(Germany) B Karbacher	4	1
WC	(Australia) S Stolle	3	4
28	(United States) J McEnroe	6	6
22	(Netherlands) R Krajicek	6	6
(Israel) G Bloom	3	3
(United States) B Shelton	6	6
11	(United States) A Agassi	4	4

Third round
5	(Croatia) G Ivanišević	7	5	5
28	(United States) J McEnroe	5	7	7
22	(Netherlands) R Krajicek	6	7
(United States) B Shelton	3	5

Fourth round
28	(United States) J McEnroe	6^{3}	4
22	(Netherlands) R Krajicek	7^{7}	6

==== Section 6 ====
First round
(Brazil) F Roese	1	3
(United States) T Witsken	6	6
(Haiti) R Agénor	6	3	6
Q	(United States) S Bryan	1	6	4
(United States) P McEnroe	3	6	6
(Italy) S Pescosolido	6	2	1
(France) A Boetsch	6	7
(Netherlands) J Siemerink	4	5

Second round
13	(Sweden) M Gustafsson	3	2
(United States) T Witsken	6	6
(Haiti) R Agénor	6	1	4
20	(Argentina) A Mancini	1	6	6
29	(Netherlands) P Haarhuis	6	6
(United States) P McEnroe	3	3
(France) A Boetsch	6	5	3
3	(Germany) B Becker	3	7	6

Third round
(United States) T Witsken	4	3
20	(Argentina) A Mancini	6	6
29	(Netherlands) P Haarhuis	4	6^{4}
3	(Germany) B Becker	6	7^{7}

Fourth round
20	(Argentina) A Mancini	4	6	6
3	(Germany) B Becker	6	1	4

==== Section 7 ====
First round
(South Africa) G Muller	7^{7}	3	4
(Argentina) J Frana	6^{2}	6	6
(Australia) J Stoltenberg	4	6	6
(Brazil) J Oncins	6	3	0
(Argentina) G Markus	4	4
(France) C Pioline	6	6
(France) F Santoro	2	6	3
(France) R Gilbert	6	4	6

Second round
8	(Spain) E Sánchez	6	6
(Argentina) J Frana	2	3
(Australia) J Stoltenberg	2	7	4
25	(Commonwealth of Independent States) A Cherkasov	6	5	6
24	(Israel) A Mansdorf	5	5
(France) C Pioline	7	7
(France) R Gilbert	6	2	7^{7}
10	(Czechoslovakia) K Nováček	4	6	6^{5}

Third round
8	(Spain) E Sánchez	6^{3}	2
25	(Commonwealth of Independent States) A Cherkasov	7^{7}	6
(France) C Pioline	6	6
(France) R Gilbert	2	0

Fourth round
25	(Commonwealth of Independent States) A Cherkasov	7^{7}	6
(France) C Pioline	6^{1}	2

==== Section 8 ====
First round
(Sweden) J Gunnarsson	3	2
(Peru) J Yzaga	6	6
Q	(United States) M Blackman	3	7	6
(Germany) P Baur	6	5	0
Q	(United States) D Randall	4	4
Q	(United States) R Weiss	6	6
Q	(South Africa) G Stafford	6	2	6
(Italy) C Caratti	3	6	1

Second round
16	(United States) B Gilbert	6	2	3
(Peru) J Yzaga	4	6	6
Q	(United States) M Blackman	3	4
17	(Switzerland) J Hlasek	6	6
31	(United States) R Reneberg	3	0^{r}
Q	(United States) R Weiss	6	1
Q	(South Africa) G Stafford	7	1	1^{r}
2	(Sweden) S Edberg	5	6	0

Third round
(Peru) J Yzaga	3	3
17	(Switzerland) J Hlasek	6	6
Q	(United States) R Weiss	6	3	6
2	(Sweden) S Edberg	3	6	4

Fourth round
17	(Switzerland) J Hlasek	6	6
Q	(United States) R Weiss	2	2
