= 1991 French Open – Men's singles =

Men's singles
- 1991 French Open

Final
- Champion: (United States) Jim Courier
- Runner-up: (United States) Andre Agassi
- Score: 3–6, 6–4, 2–6, 6–1, 6–4

Details
- Draw: 128
- Seeds: 16

Events
Singles	men	women		boys	girls
Doubles	men	women	mixed	boys	girls
WC Singles	men	women	quad
WC Doubles	men	women	quad
Legends	−45	45+	women
← 1990 ·	French Open	· 1992 →

Jim Courier defeated Andre Agassi in the final, 3–6, 6–4, 2–6, 6–1, 6–4 to win the men's singles tennis title at the 1991 French Open. It was his first major singles title.

Andrés Gómez was the reigning champion, but did not compete this year.

Boris Becker was attempting to complete the career Grand Slam, but lost to Agassi in the semifinals.

== Seeds ==
The seeded players are listed below. Jim Courier is the champion; others show the round in which they were eliminated.

1. (Sweden) Stefan Edberg (quarterfinals)
2. (Germany) Boris Becker (semifinals)
3. (Czechoslovakia) ~~Ivan Lendl~~ (withdrew due to wrist injury)
4. (United States) Andre Agassi (finals)
5. (Spain) Sergi Bruguera (second round)
6. (United States) Pete Sampras (second round)
7. (France) Guy Forget (fourth round)
8. (Socialist Federal Republic of Yugoslavia) Goran Ivanišević (second round)
9. (United States) Jim Courier (champion)
10. (United States) Michael Chang (quarterfinals)
11. (Spain) Emilio Sánchez (second round)
12. (Germany) Michael Stich (semifinals)
13. (Sweden) ~~Jonas Svensson~~ (withdrew due to injury)
14. (Czechoslovakia) Karel Nováček (first round)
15. (United States) John McEnroe (first round)
16. (United States) Brad Gilbert (first round)

== Draw ==
=== Key ===
- Q = Qualifier
- WC = Wild card
- LL = Lucky loser
- Alt = Alternate
- ITF = ITF entry
- PR = Protected ranking
- SR = Special ranking
- SE = Special exempt
- JE = Junior exempt
- JR = Junior Accelerator Programme entrant
- CO = College Accelerator Programme entrant
- NG = Next Gen Accelerator Program entrant
- w/o = Walkover
- r = Retired
- d = Defaulted

=== Finals ===
Quarterfinals
1	(Sweden) Stefan Edberg	4	6	3	4
9	(United States) Jim Courier	6	2	6	6
(Argentina) Franco Davín	4	4	4
12	(Germany) Michael Stich	6	6	6
(Switzerland) Jakob Hlasek	3	1	1
4	(United States) Andre Agassi	6	6	6
10	(United States) Michael Chang	4	4	2
2	(Germany) Boris Becker	6	6	6

Semifinals
9	(United States) Jim Courier	6	6^{8}	6	6
12	(Germany) Michael Stich	2	7^{10}	2	4
4	(United States) Andre Agassi	7	6	3	6
2	(Germany) Boris Becker	5	3	6	1

Final
9	(United States) Jim Courier	3	6	2	6	6
4	(United States) Andre Agassi	6	4	6	1	4

=== Top half ===
==== Section 1 ====
First round
1	(Sweden) S Edberg	6	6	6
LL	(Belgium) B Wuyts	2	2	3
(United States) D Wheaton	2	7^{7}	6	2	4
(Austria) H Skoff	6	6^{4}	3	6	6
(France) G Raoux	6	2	4	3
(Germany) P Kühnen	4	6	6	6
(Soviet Union) A Chesnokov	7	6	6^{4}	2	6
(Netherlands) M Koevermans	5	2	7^{7}	6	3
Q	(Romania) D Pescariu	5	7	6	4
Q	(Chile) F Rivera	7	5	0	0^{r}
WC	(France) T Tulasne	1	6	4	2
(Peru) J Yzaga	6	4	6	6
(Australia) P Cash	6	7^{7}	6
Q	(Hungary) S Noszály	4	6^{2}	3
(Soviet Union) A Cherkasov	2	6	7	7^{7}
15	(United States) J McEnroe	6	4	5	6^{0}

Second round
1	(Sweden) S Edberg	6	5	7^{7}	6
(Austria) H Skoff	4	7	6^{4}	3
(Germany) P Kühnen	6	3	6	3	6
(Soviet Union) A Chesnokov	4	6	3	6	8
Q	(Romania) D Pescariu	2	2	0
(Peru) J Yzaga	6	6	6
(Australia) P Cash	7^{7}	1	3	6	5
(Soviet Union) A Cherkasov	6^{3}	6	6	3	7

Third round
1	(Sweden) S Edberg	6	6	6
(Soviet Union) A Chesnokov	1	4	3
(Peru) J Yzaga	5	6	3	3
(Soviet Union) A Cherkasov	7	3	6	6

Fourth round
1	(Sweden) S Edberg	7^{7}	6	6
(Soviet Union) A Cherkasov	6^{4}	4	3

==== Section 2 ====
First round
9	(United States) J Courier	6	6	6
(United States) D Rostagno	3	3	0
(South Africa) W Ferreira	6	6	6
(Germany) C-U Steeb	4	1	4
(Italy) R Furlan	3	0	2
Q	(Czechoslovakia) S Doseděl	6	6	6
(Portugal) N Marques	1	3	2
(Sweden) M Larsson	6	6	6
Q	(United States) T Martin	6	6^{3}	6	6
(Mexico) L Herrera	3	7^{7}	4	4
(South Africa) G Muller	6	4	6	6^{2}	6
(Canada) G Connell	4	6	3	7^{7}	0
(Netherlands) P Haarhuis	6	6	6
(United States) R Reneberg	3	3	1
WC	(France) F Fontang	4	6	3	1
8	(Socialist Federal Republic of Yugoslavia) G Ivanišević	6	1	6	6

Second round
9	(United States) J Courier	6	6	6
(South Africa) W Ferreira	2	3	4
Q	(Czechoslovakia) S Doseděl	5	2	4
(Sweden) M Larsson	7	6	6
Q	(United States) T Martin	6	6	6
(South Africa) G Muller	1	2	2
(Netherlands) P Haarhuis	6	6	6
8	(Socialist Federal Republic of Yugoslavia) G Ivanišević	1	4	1

Third round
9	(United States) J Courier	6	4	4	7	6
(Sweden) M Larsson	3	6	6	5	2
Q	(United States) T Martin	6	4	6	6
(Netherlands) P Haarhuis	2	6	3	4

Fourth round
9	(United States) J Courier	6	6	6
Q	(United States) T Martin	2	3	3

==== Section 3 ====
First round
LL	(Argentina) M Ingaramo	6	4	7	5	4
(Argentina) M Jaite	4	6	5	7	6
(Sweden) C Bergström	3	4	1
(Argentina) F Davín	6	6	6
(France) R Gilbert	2	1	1
(France) H Leconte	6	6	6
(Czechoslovakia) M Vajda	3	6	6	6
Q	(Sweden) N Kroon	6	3	1	3
(Sweden) N Kulti	6	3	6	6
(Germany) P Baur	4	6	4	2
(Brazil) L Mattar	4	3	1
WC	(France) A Boetsch	6	6	6
(Australia) M Woodforde	1	7^{11}	1	3
Q	(Uruguay) D Pérez	6	6^{9}	6	6
Q	(Argentina) G Markus	6	7	6
LL	(Canada) A Sznajder	1	5	4

Second round
(Argentina) M Jaite	4	3	2
(Argentina) F Davín	6	6	6
(France) H Leconte	6	4	6^{8}	4
(Czechoslovakia) M Vajda	3	6	7^{10}	6
(Sweden) N Kulti	3	3	3
WC	(France) A Boetsch	6	6	6
Q	(Uruguay) D Pérez	6	6	4	4	3
Q	(Argentina) G Markus	2	2	6	6	6

Third round
(Argentina) F Davín	6	2	6	3	6
(Czechoslovakia) M Vajda	2	6	4	6	4
WC	(France) A Boetsch	5	7^{7}	6	6
Q	(Argentina) G Markus	7	6^{2}	3	2

Fourth round
(Argentina) F Davín	7^{7}	4	6	6
WC	(France) A Boetsch	6^{2}	6	3	1

==== Section 4 ====
First round
12	(Germany) M Stich	6	6	7
(United States) B Pearce	3	2	5
(Netherlands) R Krajicek	6	6	6
LL	(Spain) JF Altur	0	4	1
(Netherlands) J Eltingh	2	3	3
Q	(Spain) C Costa	6	6	6
(United States) J Grabb	6	6	4	2	3
WC	(France) T Benhabiles	4	4	6	6	6
(France) F Santoro	6	7	6
(Germany) A Mronz	4	5	1
Q	(Mexico) L Lavalle	4	3	2
(Sweden) M Wilander	6	6	6
(Finland) A Rahunen	6^{4}	5	6	1
(France) T Champion	7^{7}	7	1	6
(Austria) T Muster	6	6	4	1	4
6	(United States) P Sampras	4	4	6	6	6

Second round
12	(Germany) M Stich	6^{4}	7^{8}	6	6
(Netherlands) R Krajicek	7^{7}	6^{6}	3	2
Q	(Spain) C Costa	7	6	6
WC	(France) T Benhabiles	5	1	2
(France) F Santoro	6	6	6
(Sweden) M Wilander	2	3	2
(France) T Champion	6	6	6
6	(United States) P Sampras	3	1	1

Third round
12	(Germany) M Stich	3	7	7^{7}	6
Q	(Spain) C Costa	6	5	6^{4}	2
(France) F Santoro	6	6	6
(France) T Champion	2	0	4

Fourth round
12	(Germany) M Stich	6	6	6
(France) F Santoro	3	1	2

=== Bottom half ===
==== Section 5 ====
First round
5	(Spain) S Bruguera	6	6	6
(United States) S Davis	2	2	1
(Germany) U Riglewski	4	2	2
(Italy) O Camporese	6	6	6
Q	(Spain) JC Báguena	4	6	6	3	3
Q	(Argentina) C Miniussi	6	3	2	6	6
(Uruguay) M Filippini	6	3	6	6
(Australia) R Fromberg	4	6	1	2
(Italy) C Caratti	2	2	6	6	6
Q	(Spain) G López	6	6	3	3	4
(Spain) T Carbonell	5	6	6	6
(Sweden) J Gunnarsson	7	2	3	1
(Switzerland) J Hlasek	6	6	7
(United States) D Pate	4	1	5
(Sweden) A Järryd	2	3	2
11	(Spain) E Sánchez	6	6	6

Second round
5	(Spain) S Bruguera	6	6	4	0^{r}
(Italy) O Camporese	1	2	6	1
Q	(Argentina) C Miniussi	1	6	4
(Uruguay) M Filippini	6	2	4	r
(Italy) C Caratti	1	5	6	1
(Spain) T Carbonell	6	7	3	6
(Switzerland) J Hlasek	6	4	6	7^{7}
11	(Spain) E Sánchez	3	6	2	6^{5}

Third round
(Italy) O Camporese	6	3	1	3
Q	(Argentina) C Miniussi	2	6	6	6
(Spain) T Carbonell	6^{7}	6	4	3
(Switzerland) J Hlasek	7^{9}	4	6	6

Fourth round
Q	(Argentina) C Miniussi	6	3	7	5	2
(Switzerland) J Hlasek	4	6	5	7	6

==== Section 6 ====
First round
14	(Czechoslovakia) K Nováček	2	6	1^{r}
(Sweden) M Gustafsson	6	3	5
(Belgium) E Masso	7^{7}	4	6	4	5
(United States) A Krickstein	6^{3}	6	2	6	7
(Socialist Federal Republic of Yugoslavia) G Prpić	7^{7}	6	6
Q	(South Africa) M Robertson	6^{5}	3	3
WC	(Argentina) A Mancini	7	6	6
(Germany) E Jelen	5	4	2
(United States) P McEnroe	7	6	7^{7}
(Israel) G Bloom	5	4	6^{5}
WC	(France) O Soules	2	6^{5}	5
(Australia) J Stoltenberg	6	7^{7}	7
(Czechoslovakia) P Korda	4	6	6	6
(France) J-P Fleurian	6	4	2	4
(Switzerland) M Rosset	6	5	4	3
4	(United States) A Agassi	3	7	6	6

Second round
(Sweden) M Gustafsson	6	4	6	6
(United States) A Krickstein	1	6	4	2
(Socialist Federal Republic of Yugoslavia) G Prpić	6	5	4	6	2
WC	(Argentina) A Mancini	1	7	6	1	6
(United States) P McEnroe	7^{7}	6	6
(Australia) J Stoltenberg	6^{1}	3	4
(Czechoslovakia) P Korda	1	2	2
4	(United States) A Agassi	6	6	6

Third round
(Sweden) M Gustafsson	3	6	2	3
WC	(Argentina) A Mancini	6	3	6	6
(United States) P McEnroe	2	2	0
4	(United States) A Agassi	6	6	6

Fourth round
WC	(Argentina) A Mancini	3	3	7	1
4	(United States) A Agassi	6	6	5	6

==== Section 7 ====
First round
7	(France) G Forget	7	2	7	1	7
(United States) M Washington	5	6	5	6	5
(United States) J Arias	6	3	6	6
(Chile) P Rebolledo	0	6	0	2
(United States) J Tarango	2	2	1
(Finland) V Paloheimo	6	6	6
Q	(South Africa) M Ondruska	3	7	6	6
(Spain) J Aguilera	6	5	3	2
(Japan) S Matsuoka	2	3	7^{7}	3
(Haiti) R Agénor	6	6	6^{4}	6
(United States) T Witsken	3	3	5
WC	(United States) J Connors	6	6	7
(Argentina) H de la Peña	6^{5}	3	0^{r}
(Sweden) L Jönsson	7^{7}	6	2
(Netherlands) J Siemerink	2	0	3
10	(United States) M Chang	6	6	6

Second round
7	(France) G Forget	6	6	5	7^{7}
(United States) J Arias	3	2	7	6^{4}
(Finland) V Paloheimo	6	1	1	6	0
Q	(South Africa) M Ondruska	3	6	6	2	6
(Haiti) R Agénor	4	2	6	6	4
WC	(United States) J Connors	6	6	3	0	6
(Sweden) L Jönsson	6^{4}	6	4	6	3
10	(United States) M Chang	7^{7}	4	6	3	6

Third round
7	(France) G Forget	6	6	3	6
Q	(South Africa) M Ondruska	1	4	6	3
WC	(United States) J Connors	6	5	2	6	0^{r}
10	(United States) M Chang	4	7	6	4	0

Fourth round
7	(France) G Forget	1	1	6	3
10	(United States) M Chang	6	6	4	6

==== Section 8 ====
First round
16	(United States) B Gilbert	3	6	1	4
WC	(France) C Pioline	6	2	6	6
(Spain) F Clavet	6	6	6
(New Zealand) K Evernden	4	0	2
(Argentina) G Pérez Roldán	3	1	1
Q	(France) O Delaître	6	6	6
(Sweden) P Lundgren	6	7^{7}	6^{3}	7
(Soviet Union) A Volkov	3	6^{5}	7^{7}	5
(Portugal) J Cunha-Silva	6^{6}	1	4
(Australia) W Masur	7^{8}	6	6
(Spain) J Sánchez	7	4	4	3
(Brazil) J Oncins	5	6	6	6
(Germany) C Saceanu	4	6^{4}	4
(Australia) T Woodbridge	6	7^{7}	6
(Spain) J Arrese	2	5	2
2	(Germany) B Becker	6	7	6

Second round
WC	(France) C Pioline	2	3	6^{2}
(Spain) F Clavet	6	6	7^{7}
Q	(France) O Delaître	6	6^{2}	6	6
(Sweden) P Lundgren	2	7^{7}	4	2
(Australia) W Masur	6	7^{11}	7
(Brazil) J Oncins	1	6^{9}	5
(Australia) T Woodbridge	7	6	4	4	4
2	(Germany) B Becker	5	1	6	6	6

Third round
(Spain) F Clavet	4	6	6	6
Q	(France) O Delaître	6	2	3	3
(Australia) W Masur	3	3	2
2	(Germany) B Becker	6	6	6

Fourth round
(Spain) F Clavet	6^{6}	4	3
2	(Germany) B Becker	7^{8}	6	6

Preceded by 1991 Australian Open – Men's singles	Grand Slam men's singles	Succeeded by 1991 Wimbledon Championships – Men's singles
