= 1991 French Open – Men's doubles =

Tennis tournament

Men's doubles
- 1991 French Open

Final
- Champion: (Australia) John Fitzgerald (Sweden) Anders Järryd
- Runner-up: (United States) Rick Leach (United States) Jim Pugh
- Score: 6–0, 7–6^{(7–2)}

Details
- Draw: 64
- Seeds: 16

Events
Singles	men	women		boys	girls
Doubles	men	women	mixed	boys	girls
WC Singles	men	women	quad
WC Doubles	men	women	quad
Legends	−45	45+	women
- French Open

The men's doubles event at the 1991 French Open tennis tournament was held from 27 May until 9 June 1991 on the outdoor clay courts at the Stade Roland Garros in Paris, France. John Fitzgerald and Anders Järryd won the title, defeating Goran Ivanišević and Petr Korda in the final.

== Seeds ==
1. (United States) Scott Davis / (United States) David Pate (first round)
2. (Spain) Sergio Casal / (Spain) Javier Sánchez (third round)
3. (United States) Rick Leach / (United States) Jim Pugh (final)
4. (United States) Patrick Galbraith / (United States) Todd Witsken (first round)
5. (France) Guy Forget / (Switzerland) Jakob Hlasek (third round)
6. (Canada) Grant Connell / (Canada) Glenn Michibata (semifinals)
7. (South Africa) Gary Muller / (South Africa) Danie Visser (quarterfinals)
8. (United States) Jim Grabb / (United States) Patrick McEnroe (first round)
9. (Australia) John Fitzgerald / (Sweden) Anders Järryd (champions)
10. (Germany) Udo Riglewski / (Germany) Michael Stich (third round)
11. (Australia) Darren Cahill / (Australia) Mark Kratzmann (second round)
12. (Australia) Todd Woodbridge / (Australia) Mark Woodforde (third round)
13. (Netherlands) Paul Haarhuis / (Netherlands) Mark Koevermans (quarterfinals)
14. (Socialist Federal Republic of Yugoslavia) Goran Ivanišević / (Czechoslovakia) Petr Korda (second round)
15. (United States) Luke Jensen / (Australia) Laurie Warder (quarterfinals)
16. (United States) Ken Flach / (United States) Robert Seguso (second round)

== Draw ==
Key

- Q = Qualifier
- WC = Wild card
- LL = Lucky loser
- Alt = Alternate
- ITF = ITF entry
- PR = Protected ranking
- SR = Special ranking
- SE = Special exempt
- JE = Junior exempt
- JR = Junior Accelerator Programme entrant
- CO = College Accelerator Programme entrant
- NG = Next Gen Accelerator Program entrant
- w/o = Walkover
- r = Retired
- d = Defaulted

=== Finals ===
Quarterfinals
15	(United States) Luke Jensen (Australia) Laurie Warder	6	7	7
9	(Australia) John Fitzgerald (Sweden) Anders Järryd	7	5	9
13	(Netherlands) Paul Haarhuis (Netherlands) Mark Koevermans	2	5
6	(Canada) Grant Connell (Canada) Glenn Michibata	6	7
(Netherlands) Tom Nijssen (Czechoslovakia) Cyril Suk	4	6	4
3	(United States) Rick Leach (United States) Jim Pugh	6	1	6
7	(South Africa) Gary Muller (South Africa) Danie Visser	4	4
(Argentina) Javier Frana (Mexico) Leonardo Lavalle	6	6

Semifinals
9	(Australia) John Fitzgerald (Sweden) Anders Järryd	6	6
6	(Canada) Grant Connell (Canada) Glenn Michibata	0	4
3	(United States) Rick Leach (United States) Jim Pugh	6	7
(Argentina) Javier Frana (Mexico) Leonardo Lavalle	3	5

Final
9	(Australia) John Fitzgerald (Sweden) Anders Järryd	6	7
3	(United States) Rick Leach (United States) Jim Pugh	0	6

=== Top half ===
==== Section 1 ====
First round
1	(United States) S Davis (United States) D Pate	7	3	2
(Mexico) J Lozano (Argentina) C Miniussi	6	6	6
(Spain) F Clavet (Spain) C Costa	6	7
(United States) J Brown (United States) D Rostagno	4	6
WC	(France) G Raoux (France) F Santoro	6	1
(United States) C Beckman (United States) S Melville	7	6
(Iran) M Bahrami (France) E Winogradsky	6	3	4
15	(United States) L Jensen (United States) L Warder	3	6	6
9	(Australia) J Fitzgerald (Sweden) A Järryd	7	6
(Brazil) L Mattar (Uruguay) D Pérez	5	2
(Sweden) D Engel (Sweden) O Jonsson	6	7
WC	(France) T Benhabiles (France) C Pioline	4	6
(Netherlands) J Eltingh (Belgium) L Pimek	6	2	8
(United States) B Garnett (United States) G Van Emburgh	3	6	6
(Netherlands) HJ Davids (Netherlands) J Siemerink	6	6
8	(United States) J Grabb (United States) P McEnroe	4	3

Second round
(Mexico) J Lozano (Argentina) C Miniussi	6	6
(Spain) F Clavet (Spain) C Costa	3	4
(United States) C Beckman (United States) S Melville	6	3	7
15	(United States) L Jensen (United States) L Warder	2	6	9
9	(Australia) J Fitzgerald (Sweden) A Järryd	7	6
(Sweden) D Engel (Sweden) O Jonsson	5	3
(Netherlands) J Eltingh (Belgium) L Pimek	6	6
(Netherlands) HJ Davids (Netherlands) J Siemerink	2	1

Third round
(Mexico) J Lozano (Argentina) C Miniussi	7	4	3
15	(United States) L Jensen (United States) L Warder	5	6	6
9	(Australia) J Fitzgerald (Sweden) A Järryd	6	6
(Netherlands) J Eltingh (Belgium) L Pimek	3	4

Quarterfinals
15	(United States) L Jensen (United States) L Warder	6	7	7
9	(Australia) J Fitzgerald (Sweden) A Järryd	7	5	9

==== Section 2 ====
First round
4	(United States) P Galbraith (United States) T Witsken	3	4
(United States) S DeVries (Australia) D Macpherson	6	6
(United States) D Flach (Italy) D Nargiso	2	7	3
(Spain) T Carbonell (Argentina) H de la Peña	6	6	6
(Sweden) M Larsson (Sweden) N Kulti	7	6	10
(United States) R Reneberg (United States) D Wheaton	6	7	12
(United States) K Kinnear (United States) S Salumaa	3	2
13	(Netherlands) P Haarhuis (Netherlands) M Koevermans	6	6
12	(Australia) T Woodbridge (Australia) M Woodforde	6	6
(Sweden) P Henricsson (Sweden) N Utgren	4	3
(Spain) JL Aparisi (Spain) V Solves	2	6	1
(Argentina) G Luza (Brazil) C Motta	6	4	6
(Czechoslovakia) M Damm (Brazil) J Oncins	6	3
(Israel) G Bloom (Kenya) P Wekesa	7	6
(South Africa) S Kruger (South Africa) P Norval	7	6	10
6	(Canada) G Connell (Canada) G Michibata	6	7	12

Second round
(United States) S DeVries (Australia) D Macpherson	4	6	6
(Spain) T Carbonell (Argentina) H de la Peña	6	4	3
(United States) R Reneberg (United States) D Wheaton	5	6	3
13	(Netherlands) P Haarhuis (Netherlands) M Koevermans	7	4	6
12	(Australia) T Woodbridge (Australia) M Woodforde	6	6
(Argentina) G Luza (Brazil) C Motta	1	4
(Israel) G Bloom (Kenya) P Wekesa	4	4
6	(Canada) G Connell (Canada) G Michibata	6	6

Third round
(United States) S DeVries (Australia) D Macpherson	2	2
13	(Netherlands) P Haarhuis (Netherlands) M Koevermans	6	6
12	(Australia) T Woodbridge (Australia) M Woodforde	6	3
6	(Canada) G Connell (Canada) G Michibata	7	6

Quarterfinals
13	(Netherlands) P Haarhuis (Netherlands) M Koevermans	2	5
6	(Canada) G Connell (Canada) G Michibata	6	7

=== Bottom half ===
==== Section 3 ====
First round
5	(France) G Forget (Switzerland) J Hlasek	4	7	7
(Sweden) J Gunnarsson (Denmark) M Mortensen	6	6	5
(Netherlands) M Oosting (Czechoslovakia) D Vacek	5	7	6
(United States) S Patridge (United States) K Thorne	7	6	3
(United States) S Cannon (The Bahamas) R Smith	6	5
(Netherlands) T Nijssen (Czechoslovakia) C Suk	7	7
(Australia) B Dyke (Sweden) P Lundgren	4	5
11	(Australia) D Cahill (Australia) M Kratzmann	6	7
14	(Socialist Federal Republic of Yugoslavia) G Ivanišević (Czechoslovakia) P Korda	7	6	6
WC	(France) JP Fleurian (Switzerland) M Rosset	6	7	4
(New Zealand) K Evernden (United States) J Rive	4	6
(Netherlands) R Krajicek (Netherlands) M Schapers	6	7
(United States) B Pearce (South Africa) B Talbot	5	6	3
(United Kingdom) J Bates (United Kingdom) N Brown	7	4	6
(Spain) M Gorriz (Soviet Union) A Olhovskiy	4	6	2
3	(United States) R Leach (United States) J Pugh	6	2	6

Second round
5	(France) G Forget (Switzerland) J Hlasek	6	6
(Netherlands) M Oosting (Czechoslovakia) D Vacek	2	2
(Netherlands) T Nijssen (Czechoslovakia) C Suk	6	6
11	(Australia) D Cahill (Australia) M Kratzmann	4	4
14	(Socialist Federal Republic of Yugoslavia) G Ivanišević (Czechoslovakia) P Korda	6	5	2
(Netherlands) R Krajicek (Netherlands) M Schapers	4	7	6
(United Kingdom) J Bates (United Kingdom) N Brown	7	5	3
3	(United States) R Leach (United States) J Pugh	6	7	6

Third round
5	(France) G Forget (Switzerland) J Hlasek	2	1
(Netherlands) T Nijssen (Czechoslovakia) C Suk	6	6
(Netherlands) R Krajicek (Netherlands) M Schapers	6	3	7
3	(United States) R Leach (United States) J Pugh	1	6	9

Quarterfinals
(Netherlands) T Nijssen (Czechoslovakia) C Suk	4	6	4
3	(United States) R Leach (United States) J Pugh	6	1	6

==== Section 4 ====
First round
7	(South Africa) G Muller (South Africa) D Visser	7	6	6
(France) O Delaître (France) R Gilbert	6	7	4
(Czechoslovakia) B Stankovič (Czechoslovakia) R Vogel	4	6
(Australia) N Borwick (Australia) S Youl	6	7
WC	(France) A Boetsch (France) T Champion	6	7
(United States) P Annacone (Venezuela) N Pereira	2	6
(Spain) J Sánchez (Socialist Federal Republic of Yugoslavia) S Živojinović	2	7	3
10	(Germany) U Riglewski (Germany) M Stich	6	6	6
16	(United States) K Flach (United States) R Seguso	6	6
(Argentina) P Albano (Venezuela) A González Mora	1	4
(Argentina) J Frana (Mexico) L Lavalle	6	3	6
(Spain) JC Báguena (Sweden) T Svantesson	3	6	1
(Czechoslovakia) V Flégl (Socialist Federal Republic of Yugoslavia) G Prpić	7	6
(Australia) W Masur (Australia) J Stoltenberg	6	4
(Sweden) R Båthman (Sweden) R Bergh	3	4
2	(Spain) S Casal (Spain) E Sánchez	6	6

Second round
7	(South Africa) G Muller (South Africa) D Visser	7	6
(Australia) N Borwick (Australia) S Youl	6	3
WC	(France) A Boetsch (France) T Champion	4	4
10	(Germany) U Riglewski (Germany) M Stich	6	6
16	(United States) K Flach (United States) R Seguso	7	3	5
(Argentina) J Frana (Mexico) L Lavalle	5	6	7
(Czechoslovakia) V Flégl (Socialist Federal Republic of Yugoslavia) G Prpić	4	7	3
2	(Spain) S Casal (Spain) E Sánchez	6	6	6

Third round
7	(South Africa) G Muller (South Africa) D Visser	7	7
10	(Germany) U Riglewski (Germany) M Stich	6	5
(Argentina) J Frana (Mexico) L Lavalle	7	1	6
2	(Spain) S Casal (Spain) E Sánchez	6	6	4

Quarterfinals
7	(South Africa) G Muller (South Africa) D Visser	4	4
2	(Argentina) J Frana (Mexico) L Lavalle	6	6
