= 1992 ATP German Open – Singles =

Singles
- 1992 ATP German Open

Final
- Champion: (Sweden) Stefan Edberg
- Runner-up: (Germany) Michael Stich
- Score: 5–7, 6–4, 6–1

Details
- Draw: 56
- Seeds: 16

Events
Singles	Doubles
← 1991 ·	ATP German Open	· 1993 →

Stefan Edberg defeated Michael Stich in the final, 5–7, 6–4, 6–1 to win the singles tennis title at the 1992 ATP German Open.

Karel Nováček was the defending champion, but was defeated by Boris Becker in the quarterfinals.

== Seeds ==
A champion seed is indicated in bold text while text in italics indicates the round in which that seed was eliminated.

1. (Sweden) **Stefan Edberg (champion)**
2. (Germany) Boris Becker (semifinals)
3. (Germany) Michael Stich (final)
4. (United States) Michael Chang (third round)
5. (Croatia) Goran Ivanišević (third round)
6. (Czechoslovakia) Petr Korda (second round)
7. (Czechoslovakia) Ivan Lendl (second round)
8. (Czechoslovakia) Karel Nováček (quarterfinals)
9. (Spain) Emilio Sánchez (first round)
10. (Argentina) Alberto Mancini (first round)
11. (United States) Andre Agassi (second round)
12. (Netherlands) Richard Krajicek (quarterfinals)
13. (Commonwealth of Independent States) Alexander Volkov (first round)
14. (Austria) Thomas Muster (second round)
15. (South Africa) Wayne Ferreira (second round)
16. (Spain) Francisco Clavet (third round)

== Draw ==
=== Key ===
- Q = Qualifier
- WC = Wild card
- LL = Lucky loser
- Alt = Alternate
- ITF = ITF entry
- PR = Protected ranking
- SR = Special ranking
- SE = Special exempt
- JE = Junior exempt
- JR = Junior Accelerator Programme entrant
- CO = College Accelerator Programme entrant
- NG = Next Gen Accelerator Program entrant
- w/o = Walkover
- r = Retired
- d = Defaulted

=== Finals ===
Semifinals
1	(Sweden) **Stefan Edberg**	**7**	**7^{9}**
(Spain) Carlos Costa	5	6^{7}
3	(Germany) **Michael Stich**	**6**	**6**
2/WC	(Germany) Boris Becker	1	1

Final
1	(Sweden) **Stefan Edberg**	5	**6**	**6**
3	(Germany) Michael Stich	**7**	4	1

=== Top half ===
==== Section 1 ====
First round
(Spain) **J Arrese**	**6**	**6**
(Spain) G López	3	3
WC	(Germany) A Thoms	3	5
LL	(Spain) **A Berasategui**	**6**	**7**
(Germany) M Zoecke	2	**6**	2
16	(Spain) **F Clavet**	**6**	3	**6**
10	(Argentina) A Mancini	1	2
(United States) **J McEnroe**	**6**	**6**
(Italy) **S Pescosolido**	3	**6**	**6**
(Croatia) G Prpić	**6**	2	4
(Italy) **O Camporese**	**6**	**6**
WC	(Germany) A Mronz	4	2

Second round
1	(Sweden) **S Edberg**	**6**	**6**
(Spain) J Arrese	3	4
LL	(Spain) A Berasategui	3	2
16	(Spain) **F Clavet**	**6**	**6**
(United States) J McEnroe	6^{4}	**6**	4
(Italy) **S Pescosolido**	**7^{7}**	1	**6**
(Italy) **O Camporese**	**7^{7}**	**6**
7	(Czechoslovakia) I Lendl	6^{4}	2

Third round
1	(Sweden) **S Edberg**	**6**	**6**
16	(Spain) F Clavet	3	1
(Italy) S Pescosolido	4	4
(Italy) **O Camporese**	**6**	**6**

Quarterfinals
1	(Sweden) **S Edberg**	2	**7^{7}**	**6**
(Italy) O Camporese	**6**	6^{5}	2

==== Section 2 ====
First round
(Commonwealth of Independent States) **A Cherkasov**	**6**	**6**
WC	(Germany) M Naewie	4	3
(Spain) J Sánchez	3	6^{2}
(Netherlands) **P Haarhuis**	**6**	**7^{7}**
(South Africa) C van Rensburg	1	1
14	(Austria) **T Muster**	**6**	**6**
11	(United States) **A Agassi**	**6**	**6**
(Argentina) M Jaite	2	3
(Spain) **C Costa**	**6**	**6**
WC	(Germany) P Kühnen	2	2
Q	(Denmark) F Fetterlein	2	1
(France) **O Delaître**	**6**	**6**

Second round
4	(United States) **M Chang**	**6**	**6**
(Commonwealth of Independent States) A Cherkasov	1	2
(Netherlands) **P Haarhuis**	5	**6**	**7^{7}**
14	(Austria) T Muster	**7**	3	6^{1}
11	(United States) A Agassi	**6**	1	2
(Spain) **C Costa**	3	**6**	**6**
(France) **O Delaître**	5	**7^{7}**	**6**
6	(Czechoslovakia) P Korda	**7**	6^{5}	1

Third round
4	(United States) M Chang	6^{5}	6^{8}
(Netherlands) **P Haarhuis**	**7^{7}**	**7^{10}**
(Spain) **C Costa**	**6**	**6**
(France) O Delaître	2	3

Quarterfinals
(Netherlands) P Haarhuis	**6**	4	3
(Spain) **C Costa**	4	**6**	**6**

=== Bottom half ===
==== Section 3 ====
First round
(Sweden) **C Bergström**	**6**	**6**
(Netherlands) J Siemerink	0	2
(Netherlands) M Schapers	**6**	5	2
(Argentina) **G Pérez Roldán**	3	**7**	**6**
(Spain) S Bruguera	3	**6**	2
12	(Netherlands) **R Krajicek**	**6**	3	**6**
13	(Commonwealth of Independent States) A Volkov	2	**6**	6^{5}
(Austria) **H Skoff**	**6**	1	**7^{7}**
Q	(Germany) **D Prinosil**	**7**	**6**
Q	(Germany) S Nensel	5	1
(Ecuador) A Gómez	5	**7**	1
(Germany) **C-U Steeb**	**7**	5	**6**

Second round
5	(Croatia) **G Ivanišević**	**7**	**7^{8}**
(Sweden) C Bergström	5	6^{6}
(Argentina) G Pérez Roldán	3	4
12	(Netherlands) **R Krajicek**	**6**	**6**
(Austria) **H Skoff**	**6**	6^{4}	**7^{7}**
Q	(Germany) D Prinosil	2	**7^{7}**	6^{4}
(Germany) C-U Steeb	3	2
3	(Germany) **M Stich**	**6**	**6**

Third round
5	(Croatia) G Ivanišević	5	2
12	(Netherlands) **R Krajicek**	**7**	**6**
(Austria) H Skoff	3	5
3	(Germany) **M Stich**	**6**	**7**

Quarterfinals
12	(Netherlands) R Krajicek	4	**6**	3
3	(Germany) **M Stich**	**6**	3	**6**

==== Section 4 ====
First round
Q	(Chile) **F Rivera**	**6**	**7^{7}**
Q	(Spain) J F Altur	0	6^{3}
Q	(Italy) **C Caratti**	**6**	**6**
(France) F Fontang	3	3
Q	(Spain) **Á Corretja**	3	**6**	**6**
9	(Spain) E Sánchez	**6**	2	2
15	(South Africa) **W Ferreira**	**7^{7}**	**6**
(Argentina) C Miniussi	6^{3}	3
(France) C Pioline	2	3
(Italy) **R Furlan**	**6**	**6**
(France) **T Champion**	**6**	**6**
(Germany) L Koslowski	0	1

Second round
8	(Czechoslovakia) **K Nováček**	**6**	**6**
Q	(Chile) F Rivera	0	1
Q	(Italy) **C Caratti**	**7**	4	**7**
Q	(Spain) Á Corretja	5	**6**	5
15	(South Africa) W Ferreira	**7^{7}**	3	3
(Italy) **R Furlan**	6^{3}	**6**	**6**
(France) T Champion	3	6^{5}
2/WC	(Germany) **B Becker**	**6**	**7^{7}**

Third round
8	(Czechoslovakia) **K Nováček**	**6**	**6**
Q	(Italy) C Caratti	3	2
(Italy) R Furlan	**6**	4	3
2/WC	(Germany) **B Becker**	4	**6**	**6**

Quarterfinals
8	(Czechoslovakia) K Nováček	1	6^{6}
2/WC	(Germany) **B Becker**	**6**	**7^{8}**
