= 1992 US Open – Men's singles =

Men's singles
- 1992 US Open

Final
- Champion: (Sweden) Stefan Edberg
- Runner-up: (United States) Pete Sampras
- Score: 3–6, 6–4, 7–6^{(7–5)}, 6–2

Details
- Draw: 128
- Seeds: 16

Events
Singles	men	women		boys	girls
Doubles	men	women	mixed	boys	girls
WC Singles	men	women	quad
WC Doubles	men	women	quad
Legends	men	women	mixed
- US Open

Defending champion Stefan Edberg defeated Pete Sampras in the final, 3–6, 6–4, 7–6^{(7–5)}, 6–2 to win the men's singles tennis title at the 1992 US Open. It was his second US Open singles title and sixth and last major singles title overall.

The semifinal between Edberg and Michael Chang lasted 5 hours and 26 minutes, the longest US Open match in the Open Era at the time (later surpassed by the 2024 first-round match between Dan Evans and Karen Khachanov, at 5 hours and 35 minutes).

This tournament marked the last appearance in a singles major for two former world No. 1s: seven-time major singles champion John McEnroe and eight-time major singles champion Jimmy Connors. Both were defeated by world No. 1 players themselves: McEnroe lost to Jim Courier in the fourth round, while Connors lost to Ivan Lendl in the second round. This was Connors and Lendl's 35th and final professional meeting; Lendl won to end their head-to-head at 22–13 in his favor.

== Seeds ==
The seeded players are listed below. Stefan Edberg is the champion; others show the round in which they were eliminated.

1. (United States) Jim Courier (semifinalist)
2. (Sweden) Stefan Edberg (champion)
3. (United States) Pete Sampras (finalist)
4. (United States) Michael Chang (semifinalist)
5. (Croatia) Goran Ivanišević (third round)
6. (Czechoslovakia) Petr Korda (first round)
7. (Germany) Boris Becker (fourth round)
8. (United States) Andre Agassi (quarterfinalist)
9. (United States) Ivan Lendl (quarterfinalist)
10. (Spain) Carlos Costa (fourth round)
11. (Germany) Michael Stich (second round)
12. (South Africa) Wayne Ferreira (quarterfinalist)
13. (France) Guy Forget (fourth round)
14. (United States) MaliVai Washington (fourth round)
15. (Netherlands) Richard Krajicek (fourth round)
16. (United States) John McEnroe (fourth round)

== Draw ==
=== Key ===
- Q = Qualifier
- WC = Wild card
- LL = Lucky loser
- r = Retired

=== Final eight ===
Quarterfinals
1	(United States) Jim Courier	6	6^{6}	6	6
8	(United States) Andre Agassi	3	7^{8}	1	4
3	(United States) Pete Sampras	6	6	6
(Commonwealth of Independent States) Alexander Volkov	4	1	0
12	(South Africa) Wayne Ferreira	5	6	3	7^{7}	1
4	(United States) Michael Chang	7	2	6	6^{4}	6
9	(United States) Ivan Lendl	3	3	6	7	6^{3}
2	(Sweden) Stefan Edberg	6	6	3	5	7^{7}

Semifinals
1	(United States) Jim Courier	1	6	2	2
3	(United States) Pete Sampras	6	3	6	6
4	(United States) Michael Chang	7^{7}	5	6^{3}	7	4
2	(Sweden) Stefan Edberg	6^{3}	7	7^{7}	5	6

Final
3	(United States) Pete Sampras	6	4	6^{5}	2
2	(Sweden) Stefan Edberg	3	6	7^{7}	6

=== Section 1 ===
First round
1	(United States) J Courier	4	6	6	7^{7}
WC	(United States) A O'Brien	6	1	3	6^{5}
Q	(Argentina) P Albano	4	3	3
(Commonwealth of Independent States) A Chesnokov	6	6	6
(France) C Pioline	7	2
(Czechoslovakia) M Střelba	5	1	r
(Zimbabwe) B Black	6^{2}	4	4
(United States) T Witsken	7^{7}	6	6
(Austria) H Skoff	3	3	0
(Australia) R Fromberg	6	6	6
(Israel) A Mansdorf	7^{7}	4	2	7	1
(Italy) G Pozzi	6^{3}	6	6	5	6
(Spain) M A Gorriz	4	1	3
(Italy) D Nargiso	6	6	6
(Netherlands) M Schapers	4	0	4
16	(United States) J McEnroe	6	6	6

Second round
1	(United States) J Courier	4	6	6	6
(Commonwealth of Independent States) A Chesnokov	6	3	3	1
(France) C Pioline	6	5	7	6
(United States) T Witsken	3	7	5	2
(Australia) R Fromberg	6	6	7^{7}
(Italy) G Pozzi	3	4	6^{1}
(Italy) D Nargiso	6	3	0	2
16	(United States) J McEnroe	4	6	6	6

Third round
1	(United States) J Courier	7^{7}	6	3	6
(France) C Pioline	6^{2}	4	6	3
(Australia) R Fromberg	3	1	4
16	(United States) J McEnroe	6	6	6

Fourth round
1	(United States) J Courier	6	6	7^{7}
16	(United States) J McEnroe	2	2	6^{1}

=== Section 2 ===
First round
10	(Spain) C Costa	6	5	6	6
(South Africa) C van Rensburg	4	7	3	2
Q	(United States) J Brown	4	4	4
(Germany) A Mronz	6	6	6
Q	(Chile) F Rivera	4	7^{7}	2	4
Q	(United States) S Davis	6	6^{5}	6	6
(France) G Raoux	4	6^{5}	1
(Italy) O Camporese	6	7^{7}	6
(Netherlands) J Siemerink	6	3	6	6
(Mexico) L Herrera	4	6	2	3
(Spain) G López	1	4	7	7^{7}	3
(Italy) S Pescosolido	6	6	5	6^{1}	6
(Spain) F Roig	7	6	4	6
(Austria) A Antonitsch	5	4	6	2
Q	(Sweden) M Pernfors	2	4	1
8	(United States) A Agassi	6	6	6

Second round
10	(Spain) C Costa	6	6	6
(Germany) A Mronz	3	1	2
Q	(United States) S Davis	3	6	7	4	6^{1}
(Italy) O Camporese	6	3	5	6	7^{7}
(Netherlands) J Siemerink	6	6	7^{7}
(Italy) S Pescosolido	3	4	6^{2}
(Spain) F Roig	1	3	2
8	(United States) A Agassi	6	6	6

Third round
10	(Spain) C Costa	6	6	6
(Italy) O Camporese	1	2	3
(Netherlands) J Siemerink	2	3	3
8	(United States) A Agassi	6	6	6

Fourth round
10	(Spain) C Costa	4	3	2
8	(United States) A Agassi	6	6	6

=== Section 3 ===
First round
3	(United States) P Sampras	6	7	6
Q	(United States) D DiLucia	3	5	2
(Argentina) J Frana	6	4	4	4
(Czechoslovakia) M Damm	3	6	6	6
(United States) B Shelton	7^{7}	2	4	2
WC	(United States) T Martin	6^{4}	6	6	6
Q	(Italy) C Caratti	4	7^{7}	2	6	5
(Germany) P Kühnen	6	6^{4}	6	3	7
(Spain) T Carbonell	3	2	2
WC	(United States) J Palmer	6	6	6
Q	(Canada) A Sznajder	3	7^{7}	3	4
(United States) D Wheaton	6	6^{5}	6	6
(Sweden) M Larsson	6	7	6
(Italy) R Furlan	2	5	3
(United States) J Grabb	2	3	6^{5}
13	(France) G Forget	6	6	7^{7}

Second round
3	(United States) P Sampras	7	6	6
(Czechoslovakia) M Damm	5	1	2
WC	(United States) T Martin	6	6	3	6
(Germany) P Kühnen	3	3	6	4
WC	(United States) J Palmer	4	4	0
(United States) D Wheaton	6	6	6
(Sweden) M Larsson	6	1	6^{10}	0
13	(France) G Forget	4	6	7^{12}	6

Third round
3	(United States) P Sampras	7^{7}	2	4	7	6
WC	(United States) T Martin	6^{1}	6	6	5	4
(United States) D Wheaton	3	6^{4}	6	2
13	(France) G Forget	6	7^{7}	2	6

Fourth round
3	(United States) P Sampras	6	1	1	6	6
13	(France) G Forget	3	6	6	4	3

=== Section 4 ===
First round
11	(Germany) M Stich	6	6	6
(France) O Delaître	4	3	4
(United States) B Gilbert	6	6	6
WC	(United States) S Bryan	3	1	4
Q	(United States) T Ho	7^{7}	6	6
Q	(Brazil) F Meligeni	6^{4}	4	2
(Sweden) L Jönsson	6^{5}	0	4
(Australia) S Stolle	7^{7}	6	6
(Argentina) C Miniussi	2	6	6^{5}	0	r
(Belgium) B Wuyts	6	4	7^{7}	3
(Commonwealth of Independent States) A Volkov	2	7^{8}	7^{7}	6
(Australia) S Youl	6	6^{6}	6^{0}	4
(Mexico) L Lavalle	6	7^{7}	6
(Argentina) A Mancini	4	6^{3}	3
(Switzerland) M Rosset	4	4	4
5	(Croatia) G Ivanišević	6	6	6

Second round
11	(Germany) M Stich	7	3	6	3	6^{0}
(United States) B Gilbert	5	6	3	6	7^{7}
Q	(United States) T Ho	7^{7}	6	6
(Australia) S Stolle	6^{5}	3	3
(Belgium) B Wuyts	1	6	1	r
(Commonwealth of Independent States) A Volkov	6	1	1
(Mexico) L Lavalle	5	6^{7}	2
5	(Croatia) G Ivanišević	7	7^{9}	6

Third round
(United States) B Gilbert	6	6^{2}	2	6	7^{7}
Q	(United States) T Ho	1	7^{7}	6	4	6^{0}
(Commonwealth of Independent States) A Volkov	6	6	6
5	(Croatia) G Ivanišević	4	0	3

Fourth round
(United States) B Gilbert	2	4	7	6^{5}
(Commonwealth of Independent States) A Volkov	6	6	5	7^{7}

=== Section 5 ===
First round
6	(Czechoslovakia) P Korda	2	6	6	1	6^{4}
(Spain) E Sánchez	6	4	2	6	7^{7}
(Germany) K Braasch	1	2	7^{7}	6	4
(Canada) C Pridham	6	6	6^{3}	4	6
(France) T Champion	6	6	6
(Italy) C Pistolesi	4	3	2
(Germany) M Naewie	4	4	7	6^{4}
(Spain) J Sánchez	6	6	5	7^{7}
(United States) J Stark	7	6	6
(South Africa) G Muller	5	1	2
(Australia) W Masur	7^{7}	6	6
Q	(Czechoslovakia) S Doseděl	6^{4}	2	4
(France) R Gilbert	6	3	4	3
(Spain) S Bruguera	4	6	6	6
(Spain) J Arrese	6	5	3	3
12	(South Africa) W Ferreira	3	7	6	6

Second round
(Spain) E Sánchez	7^{7}	6^{5}	6	6
(Canada) C Pridham	6^{3}	7^{7}	2	4
(France) T Champion	5	1	r
(Spain) J Sánchez	7	4
(United States) J Stark	6	4	6^{4}	6	3
(Australia) W Masur	3	6	7^{7}	4	6
(Spain) S Bruguera	7^{8}	2	6	1	2
12	(South Africa) W Ferreira	6^{6}	6	3	6	6

Third round
(Spain) E Sánchez	5	6	6^{4}	7^{7}	6
(Spain) J Sánchez	7	1	7^{7}	6^{3}	4
(Australia) W Masur	4	4	2
12	(South Africa) W Ferreira	6	6	6

Fourth round
(Spain) E Sánchez	2	4	6	4
12	(South Africa) W Ferreira	6	6	2	6

=== Section 6 ===
First round
14	(United States) M Washington	6	7^{7}	6
(United States) F Montana	3	6^{4}	3
(Germany) M-K Goellner	3	6	6	6
(Sweden) A Järryd	6	3	4	0
(Netherlands) J Eltingh	1	4	7^{7}	4
(Sweden) H Holm	6	6	6^{5}	6
(United States) R Reneberg	4	6	1	2
(France) H Leconte	6	3	6	6
Q	(Spain) A Mancisidor	6	3	6	5	3
(United States) J Tarango	2	6	2	7	6
(Commonwealth of Independent States) A Cherkasov	4	1	6^{5}
(France) A Boetsch	6	6	7^{7}
(United States) P McEnroe	1	7^{7}	6	6
WC	(United States) R Matuszewski	6	6^{1}	2	4
Q	(South Africa) E Ferreira	3	4	6^{1}
4	(United States) M Chang	6	6	7^{7}

Second round
14	(United States) M Washington	6	6	6
(Germany) M-K Goellner	3	3	2
(Sweden) H Holm	1	7	2	2
(France) H Leconte	6	5	6	6
(United States) J Tarango	6	4	3	6^{3}
(France) A Boetsch	4	6	6	7^{7}
(United States) P McEnroe	3	3	4
4	(United States) M Chang	6	6	6

Third round
14	(United States) M Washington	6	6^{2}	6	6
(France) H Leconte	4	7^{7}	4	3
(France) A Boetsch	3	3	1
4	(United States) M Chang	6	6	6

Fourth round
14	(United States) M Washington	2	6	6	3	1
4	(United States) M Chang	6	2	3	6	6

=== Section 7 ===
First round
7	(Germany) B Becker	6	5	6	6
(United States) K Curren	2	7	3	4
WC	(United States) R Weiss	6
(Argentina) F Davín	1	r
(Sweden) C Bergström	4	4	6^{4}
(France) F Santoro	6	6	7^{7}
(Germany) C-U Steeb	6	7^{9}	6
Q	(Norway) C Ruud	2	6^{7}	3
WC	(United States) B Dunn	6	6	6
(Germany) M Zoecke	4	2	3
(United States) D Rostagno	2	6	0	0	r
WC	(United States) C Adams	6	2	6	5
(Brazil) J Oncins	1	2	3
(United States) J Connors	6	6	6
(Peru) J Yzaga	7^{7}	1	5	6	3
9	(United States) I Lendl	6^{2}	6	7	4	6

Second round
7	(Germany) B Becker	4	6	6	1
WC	(United States) R Weiss	6	2	1	0	r
(France) F Santoro	6	6^{6}	5	2
(Germany) C-U Steeb	2	7^{8}	7	6
WC	(United States) B Dunn	2	3	6^{4}
WC	(United States) C Adams	6	6	7^{7}
(United States) J Connors	6	3	2	0
9	(United States) I Lendl	3	6	6	6

Third round
7	(Germany) B Becker	6	4	7^{7}	6
(Germany) C-U Steeb	1	6	6^{1}	3
WC	(United States) C Adams	6	4	3	4
9	(United States) I Lendl	2	6	6	6

Fourth round
7	(Germany) B Becker	7^{7}	2	7^{7}	3	4
9	(United States) I Lendl	6^{4}	6	6^{4}	6	6

=== Section 8 ===
First round
15	(Netherlands) R Krajicek	7^{7}	6^{5}	6	6
(Spain) F Clavet	6^{2}	7^{7}	3	4
(Argentina) G Markus	6^{5}	6	6	6
Q	(South Africa) D Bosse	7^{7}	4	3	2
(Australia) T Woodbridge	6	6	6
(Spain) À Corretja	2	2	2
(Australia) M Woodforde	7^{7}	6	7^{8}
Q	(United States) T Nelson	6^{0}	4	6^{6}
(Netherlands) P Haarhuis	7	6	6
(Japan) S Matsuoka	5	2	4
(Sweden) J Svensson	2	7	6	3	7
(Sweden) N Kulti	6	5	1	6	5
(Switzerland) J Hlasek	7	6	6
(Sweden) M Gustafsson	5	3	3
(Brazil) L Mattar	4	5	2
2	(Sweden) S Edberg	6	7	6

Second round
15	(Netherlands) R Krajicek	4	2	7^{7}	6	6
(Argentina) G Markus	6	6	6^{5}	3	1
(Australia) T Woodbridge	3	2	6^{5}
(Australia) M Woodforde	6	6	7^{7}
(Netherlands) P Haarhuis	0	5	3
(Sweden) J Svensson	6	7	6
(Switzerland) J Hlasek	5	2	1
2	(Sweden) S Edberg	7	6	6

Third round
15	(Netherlands) R Krajicek	6	6	6
(Australia) M Woodforde	1	3	2
(Sweden) J Svensson	4	2	2
2	(Sweden) S Edberg	6	6	6

Fourth round
15	(Netherlands) R Krajicek	4	7^{8}	3	6	4
2	(Sweden) S Edberg	6	6^{6}	6	3	6

Preceded by 1992 Wimbledon Championships – Men's singles	Grand Slam men's singles	Succeeded by 1993 Australian Open – Men's singles
