= Thierry Champion =

French tennis player

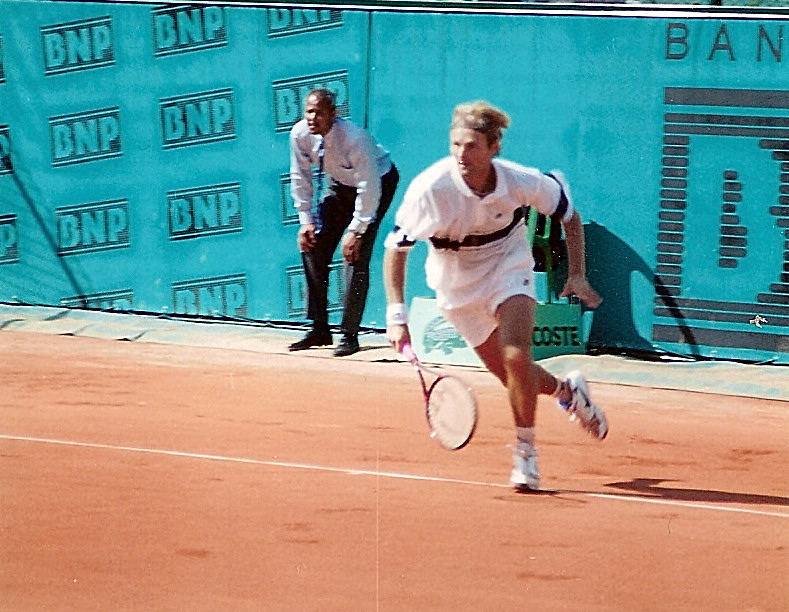
- Country (sports): France
- Residence: Paris, France
- Born: 31 August 1966 (age 59) Bagnols-sur-Cèze France
- Height: 1.83 m (6 ft 0 in)
- Turned pro: 1989
- Retired: 2004
- Plays: Right-handed (one-handed backhand)
- Prize money: $1,255,229

Singles
- Career record: 102–165
- Career titles: 0
- Highest ranking: No. 44 (26 August 1991)

Grand Slam singles results
- Australian Open: 3R (1987)
- French Open: QF (1990)
- Wimbledon: QF (1991)
- US Open: 2R (1986, 1988, 1990, 1991, 1992)

Other tournaments
- Grand Slam Cup: 1R (1991)

Doubles
- Career record: 15–38
- Career titles: 0
- Highest ranking: No. 135 (10 July 1989)

Grand Slam doubles results
- Australian Open: 1R (1989)
- French Open: 2R (1989, 1991)
- Wimbledon: 1R (1988)

Grand Slam mixed doubles results
- French Open: 3R (1989)
- Last updated on: 29 January 2022.

Thierry Champion (French pronunciation: [tjeʁi ʃɑ̃pjɔ̃]; born 31 August 1966) is a former professional tennis player from France.

== Tennis career ==
Champion was born in Bagnols-sur-Cèze, Gard. During his career, he reached the quarter-finals at the French Open in 1990 and at Wimbledon in 1991.

A clay court specialist, Champion gained notoriety on the men's ATP tour as a wild card player with the ability to inflict defeat on seeded players well above his ranking. His play style was characterised by fast court coverage and strong baseline play with measured heavily spun passing shots, particularly from an unorthodox backhand stroke.

Reaching a career-high singles ranking of World No. 44 on the men's ATP rankings in 1991, subsequent years saw a dwindling career riddled with injury.

One of the worst Grand Slam defeats in tennis history came when Champion was triple bageled, losing 6–0, 6–0, 6–0 in the 2nd round of the 1993 French Open, by eventual winner Sergi Bruguera. As of 2025, this is the most recent occasion in which this scoreline has occurred in a Major main draw match.

Champion was the coach of French tennis player Gaël Monfils starting in September 2004, but they parted ways in September 2006. He was also the coach of Hicham Arazi, Nicolas Escudé and Paul-Henri Mathieu. At the 2008 Wimbledon Championships he was seen to be coaching French player Richard Gasquet for a short stint.

== ATP career finals ==
=== Singles: 1 (1 runner-up) ===
Legend Grand Slam Tournaments (0–0) ATP World Tour Finals (0–0) ATP Masters Series (0–0) ATP Championship Series (0–0) ATP World Series (0–1)	Finals by surface Hard (0–0) Clay (0–1) Grass (0–0) Carpet (0–0)	Finals by setting Outdoors (0–1) Indoors (0–0)

Result	W–L	Date	Tournament	Tier	Surface	Opponent	Score
Loss	0–1	Aug 1988	St. Vincent, Italy	Grand Prix	Clay	(Sweden) Kent Carlsson	0–6, 2–6

== ATP Challenger and ITF Futures finals ==
=== Singles: 3 (2–1) ===
Legend ATP Challenger (2–1) ITF Futures (0–0)	Finals by surface Hard (0–1) Clay (2–0) Grass (0–0) Carpet (0–0)

Result	W–L	Date	Tournament	Tier	Surface	Opponent	Score
Win	1–0	Jul 1996	Ostend, Belgium	Challenger	Clay	(Belgium) Kris Goossens	6–3, 6–4
Win	2–0	Aug 1996	Poznań, Poland	Challenger	Clay	(Romania) Ionuț Moldovan	6–0, 6–3
Loss	2–1	Nov 1996	Réunion Island, Reunion	Challenger	Hard	(Sweden) Patrik Fredriksson	7–5, 0–6, 3–6

== Performance timelines ==
Key
W	F	SF	QF	#R	RR	Q#	DNQ	A	NH

(W) winner; (F) finalist; (SF) semifinalist; (QF) quarterfinalist; (#R) rounds 4, 3, 2, 1; (RR) round-robin stage; (Q#) qualification round; (DNQ) did not qualify; (A) absent; (NH) not held; (SR) strike rate (events won / competed); (W–L) win–loss record.

=== Singles ===
Tournament	1984	1985	1986	1987	1988	1989	1990	1991	1992	1993	1994	1995	1996	1997	1998	SR	W–L	Win %
Grand Slam tournaments
Australian Open	Q3	Q3	A	3R	A	1R	A	1R	1R	2R	A	A	A	1R	A	0 / 6	2–6	25%
French Open	A	A	1R	2R	2R	1R	QF	3R	1R	2R	2R	2R	2R	3R	Q2	0 / 12	14–12	54%
Wimbledon	A	1R	1R	A	1R	1R	Q1	QF	3R	A	A	A	1R	A	A	0 / 7	6–7	46%
US Open	A	A	2R	A	1R	A	2R	2R	2R	A	A	Q3	A	A	A	0 / 5	4–5	44%
Win–loss	0–0	0–1	1–3	2–2	1–3	0–3	5–2	7–4	3–4	2–2	1–1	1–1	1–2	2–2	0–0	0 / 30	26–30	46%
ATP Tour Masters 1000
Indian Wells	A	A	A	A	A	A	A	1R	2R	A	Q1	A	A	A	A	0 / 2	1–2	33%
Miami	A	A	A	A	1R	2R	A	1R	2R	A	Q2	Q1	A	1R	A	0 / 5	2–5	29%
Monte Carlo	A	A	A	1R	A	1R	A	1R	2R	A	A	1R	A	A	A	0 / 5	1–5	17%
Hamburg	A	A	A	A	2R	A	1R	A	2R	A	1R	Q1	A	A	A	0 / 4	2–4	33%
Rome	A	A	A	A	A	1R	1R	A	1R	A	Q2	Q2	Q3	A	A	0 / 3	0–3	0%
Canada	A	A	A	A	A	A	A	A	A	A	A	A	A	1R	A	0 / 1	0–1	0%
Cincinnati	A	A	A	A	A	A	1R	A	2R	A	A	A	A	A	A	0 / 2	1–2	33%
Paris	A	A	1R	2R	1R	A	2R	1R	A	1R	A	Q1	Q2	A	A	0 / 6	2–6	25%
Win–loss	0–0	0–0	0–1	1–2	1–3	1–3	1–4	0–4	5–6	0–1	0–1	0–1	0–0	0–2	0–0	0 / 28	9–28	24%

=== Doubles ===
Tournament	1985	1986	1987	1988	1989	1990	1991	1992	1993	SR	W–L	Win %
Grand Slam tournaments
Australian Open	A	A	A	A	1R	A	A	A	A	0 / 1	0–1	0%
French Open	A	1R	1R	1R	2R	1R	2R	1R	1R	0 / 8	2–8	20%
Wimbledon	Q2	A	A	1R	A	A	A	A	A	0 / 1	0–1	0%
US Open	A	A	A	A	A	A	A	A	A	0 / 0	0–0	–
Win–loss	0–0	0–1	0–1	0–2	1–2	0–1	1–1	0–1	0–1	0 / 10	2–10	17%
ATP Masters Series
Miami	A	A	A	A	3R	A	A	A	A	0 / 1	2–1	67%
Monte Carlo	A	A	1R	A	1R	A	A	A	A	0 / 2	0–2	0%
Paris	A	1R	A	A	A	A	A	A	A	0 / 1	0–1	0%
Win–loss	0–0	0–1	0–1	0–0	2–2	0–0	0–0	0–0	0–0	0 / 4	2–4	33%
