= Maceió Open =

Defunct tennis tournament
- Event name: Chevrolet Classic
- Tour: ATP Tour
- Founded: 1992
- Abolished: 1992
- Editions: 1
- Location: Maceió, Brazil
- Venue: Praia da Pajuçara
- Surface: Clay / outdoor

The Maceió Open (aka Chevrolet Classic or Chevrolet Open) is a defunct, ATP Tour affiliated men's tennis tournament. It was played for one year, in 1992 from February 3 to February 9. It was held in the coastal city of Maceió, Brazil at Praia da Pajuçara and was played on outdoor clay courts. Tomás Carbonell won the singles title.

== Finals ==
=== Singles ===
Year	Champions	Runners-up	Score
1992	(Spain) Tomás Carbonell	(Argentina) Christian Miniussi	7–6^{(14–12)}, 5–7, 6–2

=== Doubles ===
Year	Champions	Runners-up	Score
1992	(Argentina) Gabriel Markus (United States) John Sobel	(Brazil) Ricardo Acioly (Brazil) Mauro Menezes	6–4, 1–6, 7–5
