= Alberto Mancini =

Argentine yacht designer (born 1969)

- Country (sports): Argentina
- Born: 20 May 1969 (age 57) Misiones, Argentina
- Height: 1.80 m (5 ft 11 in)
- Turned pro: 1987
- Retired: 1994
- Plays: Right-handed (one-handed backhand)
- Prize money: $1,535,520

Singles
- Career record: 148–125
- Career titles: 3
- Highest ranking: No. 8 (9 October 1989)

Grand Slam singles results
- Australian Open: 2R (1993)
- French Open: QF (1989)
- US Open: 4R (1989)

Doubles
- Career record: 34–32
- Career titles: 4
- Highest ranking: No. 79 (7 August 1989)

Grand Slam doubles results
- French Open: 1R (1988, 1990)
- Last updated on: 15 March 2023.

Alberto César Mancini (born 20 May 1969) is a former professional tennis player from Argentina. He won three top-level singles titles and four tour doubles titles. His career-high rankings were World No. 8 in singles and No. 79 in doubles (both in 1989).

== Playing career ==
Mancini turned professional in 1987. In 1988, he won his first top-level singles title at Bologna, and his first tour doubles title at St. Vincent.

Mancini won the two most significant titles of his career in 1989. In April that year, he won the Monte Carlo Open, defeating Boris Becker in the final 7–5, 2–6, 7–6, 7–5. In May, he won the Italian Open, beating Andre Agassi in the final 6–3, 4–6, 2–6, 7–6, 6–1, saving match point in the fourth set. Both events were part of the Grand Prix Championship Series. Mancini also reached the quarter-finals of the 1989 French Open, his career-best performance at a Grand Slam event. He defeated Simon Youl, Martín Jaite, Paul Haarhuis and Jakob Hlasek before losing to Stefan Edberg.

Mancini reached the final of the Italian Open again in 1991, but was forced to retire during the final against Emilio Sánchez with Sánchez leading 6–3, 6–1, 3–0. The last major final of Mancini's career was at the Lipton International players Championships in Florida in 1992, where he lost to Michael Chang 7–5, 7–5.

Mancini, a competitor at the 1992 Summer Olympics in Barcelona, retired from the professional tour in 1994.

== Coaching career ==
In February 2003, Mancini became the coach of Guillermo Coria. Under Mancini's guidance, Coria won the tournaments at 2003 Hamburg, 2003 Stuttgart, 2003 Kitzbühel, 2003 Sopot and 2003 Basel, as well as reaching the final of 2003 Monte Carlo, the semi-finals of the 2003 French Open, and the quarter-finals of the 2003 US Open. Coria finished 2003 as world number 5. Despite these successes, Coria surprisingly decided to part ways with Mancini in February 2004, soon after an upset first-round loss at the 2004 Australian Open.

Mancini went on to become captain of the Argentina Davis Cup team, and led Argentina to the Davis Cup final in both 2006 and 2008. However, Argentina lost both finals. Mancini resigned his position as captain of the team after losing in Argentina to Spain in the 2008 Davis Cup final.

In 2010, he was granted the Konex Award Merit Diploma as one of the five best coaches of the last decade in Argentina.

In November 2020, Mancini became the coach of Fabio Fognini. He is currently coaching Daniel Altmaier.

== Performance timeline ==
Key
W	F	SF	QF	#R	RR	Q#	DNQ	A	NH

(W) winner; (F) finalist; (SF) semifinalist; (QF) quarterfinalist; (#R) rounds 4, 3, 2, 1; (RR) round-robin stage; (Q#) qualification round; (DNQ) did not qualify; (A) absent; (NH) not held; (SR) strike rate (events won / competed); (W–L) win–loss record.

=== Singles ===
Tournament	1987	1988	1989	1990	1991	1992	1993	1994	WR	W–L
Grand Slam tournaments
Australian Open	A	A	A	A	A	A	2R	A	0 / 1	1–1
French Open	A	1R	QF	2R	4R	3R	1R	Q3	0 / 6	10–6
Wimbledon	A	A	A	A	A	A	A	A	0 / 0	0–0
US Open	A	A	4R	1R	1R	1R	1R	A	0 / 5	3–5
Win–loss	0–0	0–1	7–2	1–2	3–2	2–2	1–3	0–0	0 / 12	14–13
ATP Masters Series
Indian Wells	A	A	3R	1R	A	1R	QF	1R	0 / 5	5–5
Miami	A	A	4R	2R	A	F	2R	2R	0 / 5	9–5
Monte Carlo	A	2R	W	2R	3R	2R	A	1R	1 / 6	9–5
Hamburg	A	A	1R	1R	A	1R	2R	A	0 / 4	1–4
Rome	1R	1R	W	QF	F	3R	1R	A	1 / 7	16–6
Canada	A	A	A	A	A	A	A	A	0 / 0	0–0
Cincinnati	A	A	A	A	A	A	A	A	0 / 0	0–0
Paris	A	A	2R	A	1R	A	A	A	0 / 2	1–2
Win–loss	0–1	1–2	17–4	4–5	7–3	7–5	4–4	1–2	2 / 29	41–26
Year–End Ranking	130	49	9	127	22	31	141	399		

== ATP career finals ==
=== Singles: 8 (3 titles, 5 runner-ups) ===
Legend Grand Slam Tournaments (0–0) ATP World Tour Finals (0–0) ATP Masters Series (2–2) ATP Championship Series (0–1) ATP World Series (1–2)	Finals by surface Hard (0–1) Clay (3–4) Grass (0–0) Carpet (0–0)	Finals by setting Outdoors (3–5) Indoors (0–0)

Result	W–L	Date	Tournament	Tier	Surface	Opponent	Score
Win	1–0	Jun 1988	Bologna, Italy	Grand Prix	Clay	(Spain) Emilio Sánchez	7–5, 7–6^{(7–4)}
Win	2–0	Apr 1989	Monte Carlo, Monaco	Masters Series	Clay	(Germany) Boris Becker	7–5, 2–6, 7–6^{(7–4)}, 7–5
Win	3–0	May 1989	Rome, Italy	Masters Series	Clay	(United States) Andre Agassi	6–3, 4–6, 2–6, 7–6^{(7–2)}, 6–1
Loss	3–1	May 1991	Rome, Italy	Masters Series	Clay	(Spain) Emilio Sánchez	3–6, 1–6, 0–3, ret.
Loss	3–2	Jul 1991	Båstad, Sweden	World Series	Clay	(Sweden) Magnus Gustafsson	1–6, 2–6
Loss	3–3	Jul 1991	Stuttgart, Germany	Championship Series	Clay	(Germany) Michael Stich	6–1, 6–7^{(9–11)}, 4–6, 2–6
Loss	3–4	Mar 1992	Miami, United States	Masters Series	Hard	(United States) Michael Chang	5–7, 5–7
Loss	3–5	Jul 1992	Kitzbühel, Austria	World Series	Clay	(United States) Pete Sampras	3–6, 5–7, 3–6

=== Doubles (4 wins, 2 losses) ===
Legend
Grand Slam (0)
Tennis Masters Cup (0)
ATP Masters Series (0)
ATP Tour (4)

Result	W/L	Date	Tournament	Surface	Partner	Opponents	Score
Loss	0–1	May 1988	Munich, West Germany	Clay	(Argentina) Christian Miniussi	(United States) Rick Leach (United States) Jim Pugh	1–6, 6–3, 3–6
Win	1–1	Aug 1988	Saint-Vincent, Italy	Clay	(Argentina) Christian Miniussi	(Italy) Paolo Canè (Hungary) Balázs Taróczy	6–4, 5–7, 6–3
Loss	1–2	Oct 1988	Palermo, Italy	Clay	(Argentina) Christian Miniussi	(Peru) Carlos di Laura (Uruguay) Marcelo Filippini	3–6, 5–7
Win	2–2	Jul 1989	Boston, United States	Clay	(Ecuador) Andrés Gómez	(United States) Todd Nelson (United States) Phillip Williamson	7–6, 6–2
Win	3–2	Sep 1989	Geneva, Switzerland	Clay	(Ecuador) Andrés Gómez	(Iran) Mansour Bahrami (Argentina) Guillermo Pérez Roldán	6–3, 7–5
Win	4–2	Apr 1990	Nice, France	Clay	(France) Yannick Noah	(Uruguay) Marcelo Filippini (Austria) Horst Skoff	6–4, 7–6

== ATP Challenger and ITF Futures finals ==
=== Singles: 2 (1–1) ===
Legend ATP Challenger (1–1) ITF Futures (0–0)	Finals by surface Hard (0–0) Clay (1–1) Grass (0–0) Carpet (0–0)

Result	W–L	Date	Tournament	Tier	Surface	Opponent	Score
Win	1–0	Mar 1991	Santiago, Chile	Challenger	Clay	(Chile) Pedro Rebolledo	6–3, 6–3
Loss	1–1	Sep 1991	Venice, Italy	Challenger	Clay	(Spain) Carlos Costa	3–6, 5–7

Preceded by (Argentina) Gustavo Luza	Davis Cup Argentina captain 2005-2008	Succeeded by (Argentina) Tito Vázquez
