= Christian Miniussi =

Argentine tennis player

- Full name: Christian Carlos Miniussi Ventureira
- Country (sports): Argentina
- Residence: Buenos Aires, Argentina
- Born: 5 July 1967 (age 59) Buenos Aires, Argentina
- Height: 1.85 m (6 ft 1 in)
- Turned pro: 1984
- Retired: 1995
- Plays: Right-handed (one-handed backhand)
- Prize money: $651,069

Singles
- Career record: 58–82
- Career titles: 1; 2 Challenger, 0 Futures
- Highest ranking: No. 57 (18 May 1992)

Grand Slam singles results
- Australian Open: 1R (1987, 1992)
- French Open: 4R (1991)
- Wimbledon: 1R (1990, 1992)
- US Open: 1R (1992)

Doubles
- Career record: 97–94
- Career titles: 5; 5 Challenger, 0 Futures
- Highest ranking: No. 37 (15 August 1988)

Grand Slam doubles results
- Australian Open: 2R (1991, 1992)
- French Open: 3R (1991)
- Wimbledon: 1R (1990)
- US Open: 2R (1990)

Grand Slam mixed doubles results
- Australian Open: QF (1991)
Medal record
Olympic Games
Bronze medal – third place	1992 Barcelona	Doubles
- Last updated on: 28 December 2021.

Christian Carlos Miniussi Ventureira (born 5 July 1967) is a former tennis player from Argentina. He won one career title in singles (in 1991 São Paulo, as a lucky loser) and reached his highest singles ATP ranking on 18 May 1992 of No. 57 in the world.

== Career ==
Miniussi turned professional in 1984. He started playing tennis at the Adrogué Tennis Club and he also represented his native country as a lucky loser at the 1992 Summer Olympics in Barcelona, where he was defeated in the first round by France's Fabrice Santoro. In the doubles competition Miniussi claimed the bronze medal alongside Javier Frana.

== ATP career finals ==
=== Singles: 2 (1 title, 1 runner-up) ===
Legend Grand Slam Tournaments (0–0) ATP World Tour Finals (0–0) ATP World Tour Masters Series (0–0) ATP Championship Series (0–0) ATP World Series (1–1)	Finals by surface Hard (1–0) Clay (0–1) Grass (0–0) Carpet (0–0)	Finals by setting Outdoors (1–1) Indoors (0–0)

Result	W–L	Date	Tournament	Tier	Surface	Opponent	Score
Win	1–0	Nov 1991	São Paulo, Brazil	World Series	Hard	(Brazil) Jaime Oncins	2–6, 6–3, 6–4
Loss	1–1	Feb 1992	Maceió, Brazil	World Series	Clay	(Spain) Tomás Carbonell	6–7^{(12–14)}, 7–5, 2–6

=== Doubles: 10 (5 titles, 5 runner-ups) ===
Legend Grand Slam Tournaments (0–0) ATP World Tour Finals (0–0) ATP Masters Series (0–0) ATP Championship Series (0–0) ATP International Series (5–5)	Finals by surface Hard (0–0) Clay (5–5) Grass (0–0) Carpet (0–0)	Finals by setting Outdoors (5–5) Indoors (0–0)

Result	W–L	Date	Tournament	Tier	Surface	Partner	Opponents	Score
Win	1–0	Feb 1985	Buenos Aires, Argentina	Grand Prix	Clay	(Argentina) Martín Jaite	(Argentina) Eduardo Bengoechea (Uruguay) Diego Pérez	6–4, 6–3
Loss	1–1	Sep 1987	Barcelona, Spain	Grand Prix	Clay	(Argentina) Javier Frana	(Czechoslovakia) Miloslav Mečíř (Czech Republic) Tomáš Šmíd	1–6, 2–6
Loss	1–2	May 1988	Munich, West Germany	Grand Prix	Clay	(Argentina) Alberto Mancini	(United States) Rick Leach (United States) Jim Pugh	1–6, 6–3, 3–6
Win	2–2	May 1988	Florence, Italy	Grand Prix	Clay	(Argentina) Javier Frana	(Italy) Claudio Pistolesi (Austria) Horst Skoff	7–6, 6–4
Loss	2–3	Jul 1988	Bordeaux, France	Grand Prix	Clay	(Italy) Diego Nargiso	(Sweden) Joakim Nyström (Italy) Claudio Panatta	1–6, 4–6
Win	3–3	Aug 1988	St. Vincent, Italy	Grand Prix	Clay	(Argentina) Alberto Mancini	(Italy) Paolo Canè (Hungary) Balázs Taróczy	6–4, 5–7, 6–3
Loss	3–4	Oct 1988	Palermo, Italy	Grand Prix	Clay	(Argentina) Alberto Mancini	(Austria) Carlos di Laura (Uruguay) Marcelo Filippini	3–6, 5–7
Win	4–4	Sep 1989	Barcelona, Spain	Grand Prix	Clay	(Argentina) Gustavo Luza	(Spain) Sergio Casal (Czech Republic) Tomáš Šmíd	7–6, 5–7, 6–3
Loss	4–5	Aug 1991	San Marino, San Marino	World Series	Clay	(Uruguay) Diego Pérez	(Spain) Jordi Arrese (Spain) Carlos Costa	3–6, 6–3, 3–6
Win	5–5	Jul 1992	Båstad, Sweden	World Series	Clay	(Spain) Tomás Carbonell	(Sweden) Christian Bergström (Sweden) Magnus Gustafsson	6–4, 7–5

=== Records ===
- These records were attained in the Open Era of tennis.

Tournament	Year	Record accomplished	Player tied
São Paulo	1991	Winning an ATP tournament as lucky loser	Heinz Günthardt; Bill Scanlon; Francisco Clavet; Sergiy Stakhovsky; Rajeev Ram; Leonardo Mayer; Andrey Rublev; Marco Cecchinato; Kwon Soon-woo

== ATP Challenger and ITF Futures Finals ==
=== Singles: 6 (2–4) ===
Legend ATP Challenger (2–4) ITF Futures (0–0)	Finals by surface Hard (0–0) Clay (2–4) Grass (0–0) Carpet (0–0)

Result	W–L	Date	Tournament	Tier	Surface	Opponent	Score
Loss	0–1	Jul 1989	Santos, Brazil	Challenger	Clay	(Argentina) Gabriel Markus	2–6, 2–6
Win	1–1	Feb 1990	Nairobi, Kenya	Challenger	Clay	(Peru) Pablo Arraya	2–6, 6–3, 6–4
Win	2–1	Feb 1990	Nairobi II, Kenya	Challenger	Clay	(Netherlands) Menno Oosting	6–2, 7–6
Loss	2–2	Apr 1990	Estoril, Portugal	Challenger	Clay	(France) Thierry Tulasne	2–6, 2–3 ret.
Loss	2–3	Oct 1993	Curitiba, Brazil	Challenger	Clay	(Austria) Gilbert Schaller	4–6, 0–6
Loss	2–4	Jul 1994	Poznań, Poland	Challenger	Clay	(Austria) Horst Skoff	7–6, 3–6, 4–6

=== Doubles: 11 (5–6) ===
Legend ATP Challenger (5–6) ITF Futures (0–0)	Finals by surface Hard (0–0) Clay (5–6) Grass (0–0) Carpet (0–0)

Result	W–L	Date	Tournament	Tier	Surface	Partner	Opponents	Score
Loss	0–1	Mar 1989	Casablanca, Morocco	Challenger	Clay	(Argentina) Marcelo Ingaramo	(Czech Republic) Josef Čihák (Netherlands) Mark Koevermans	4–6, 4–6
Win	1–1	Feb 1990	Nairobi, Kenya	Challenger	Clay	(Belgium) Eduardo Masso	(Portugal) João Cunha-Silva (Netherlands) Menno Oosting	3–6, 7–5, 7–6
Loss	1–2	Mar 1990	Cairo, Egypt	Challenger	Clay	(Belgium) Eduardo Masso	(Czech Republic) Tomas Anzari (Czech Republic) David Rikl	3–6, 7–6, 5–7
Win	2–2	Apr 1990	Oporto, Portugal	Challenger	Clay	(Argentina) Eduardo Bengoechea	(Spain) José Clavet (Spain) Francisco Roig	6–0, 6–3
Win	3–2	Aug 1991	Cervia, Italy	Challenger	Clay	(Uruguay) Diego Pérez	(Portugal) João Cunha-Silva (Argentina) Daniel Orsanic	6–3, 6–4
Loss	3–3	Aug 1991	Geneva, Switzerland	Challenger	Clay	(Argentina) Roberto Argüello	(Soviet Union) Vladimir Gabrichidze (Czech Republic) Martin Strelba	6–1, 3–6, 4–6
Win	4–3	Sep 1991	Merano, Italy	Challenger	Clay	(Spain) Carlos Costa	(Czech Republic) Josef Čihák (Czech Republic) Tomas Anzari	6–3, 6–3
Loss	4–4	Aug 1993	Geneva, Switzerland	Challenger	Clay	(Switzerland) Claudio Mezzadri	(Sweden) Jan Apell (Sweden) Nicklas Utgren	4–6, 2–6
Loss	4–5	Feb 1994	Punta del Este, Uruguay	Challenger	Clay	(Argentina) Luis Lobo	(Uruguay) Marcelo Filippini (Uruguay) Diego Pérez	7–6, 6–7, 6–7
Loss	4–6	Jun 1994	Furth, Germany	Challenger	Clay	(Argentina) Gastón Etlis	(Czech Republic) Vojtěch Flégl (Australia) Andrew Florent	6–7, 1–6
Win	5–6	Mar 1995	Punta del Este, Uruguay	Challenger	Clay	(Uruguay) Diego Pérez	(Argentina) Lucas Arnold Ker (Argentina) Patricio Arnold	4–6, 7–5, 6–1

== Performance timelines ==
Key
W	F	SF	QF	#R	RR	Q#	DNQ	A	NH

(W) winner; (F) finalist; (SF) semifinalist; (QF) quarterfinalist; (#R) rounds 4, 3, 2, 1; (RR) round-robin stage; (Q#) qualification round; (DNQ) did not qualify; (A) absent; (NH) not held; (SR) strike rate (events won / competed); (W–L) win–loss record.

=== Singles ===
Tournament	1986	1987	1988	1989	1990	1991	1992	1993	1994	SR	W–L	Win %
Grand Slam tournaments
Australian Open	A	1R	A	A	A	Q2	1R	A	A	0 / 2	0–2	0%
French Open	3R	A	1R	A	1R	4R	1R	A	Q1	0 / 5	5–5	50%
Wimbledon	A	A	A	A	1R	A	1R	A	A	0 / 2	0–2	0%
US Open	A	A	A	A	A	A	1R	A	Q1	0 / 1	0–1	0%
Win–loss	2–1	0–1	0–1	0–0	0–2	3–1	0–4	0–0	0–0	0 / 10	5–10	33%
ATP Masters Series
Miami	A	A	A	A	A	A	1R	A	A	0 / 1	0–1	0%
Monte Carlo	A	A	A	A	A	A	1R	A	A	0 / 1	0–1	0%
Hamburg	A	1R	A	A	A	A	1R	A	A	0 / 2	0–2	0%
Rome	A	A	A	A	1R	3R	QF	A	A	0 / 3	5–3	63%
Win–loss	0–0	0–1	0–0	0–0	0–1	2–1	3–4	0–0	0–0	0 / 7	5–7	42%

=== Doubles ===
Tournament	1985	1986	1987	1988	1989	1990	1991	1992	SR	W–L	Win %
Grand Slam tournaments
Australian Open	A	A	1R	A	A	A	2R	2R	0 / 3	2–3	40%
French Open	1R	A	A	2R	2R	2R	3R	1R	0 / 6	5–6	45%
Wimbledon	A	A	A	A	A	1R	A	A	0 / 1	0–1	0%
US Open	A	A	A	A	A	2R	A	1R	0 / 2	1–2	33%
Win–loss	0–1	0–0	0–1	1–1	1–1	2–3	3–2	1–3	0 / 12	8–12	40%
ATP Masters Series
Miami	A	A	A	A	A	A	A	1R	0 / 1	0–1	0%
Monte Carlo	A	A	A	A	A	A	A	1R	0 / 1	0–1	0%
Hamburg	A	QF	2R	A	2R	A	A	1R	0 / 4	4–4	50%
Rome	A	A	2R	A	A	QF	A	2R	0 / 3	4–3	57%
Win–loss	0–0	2–1	2–2	0–0	1–1	2–1	0–0	1–4	0 / 9	8–9	47%
