= Gabriel Markus =

Argentine tennis player

- Country (sports): Argentina
- Residence: Buenos Aires, Argentina
- Born: 31 March 1970 (age 56) Buenos Aires, Argentina
- Height: 1.80 m (5 ft 11 in)
- Turned pro: 1989
- Plays: Right-handed (one-handed backhand)
- Prize money: $589,053

Singles
- Career record: 59–72
- Career titles: 1; 5 Challenger, 0 Futures
- Highest ranking: No. 36 (27 July 1992)

Grand Slam singles results
- Australian Open: 1R (1993)
- French Open: 3R (1991, 1993)
- Wimbledon: 1R (1992)
- US Open: 4R (1991)

Doubles
- Career record: 8–9
- Career titles: 1; 0 Challenger, 0 Futures
- Highest ranking: No. 178 (19 October 1992)
- Last updated on: 7 December 2021.

Gabriel Markus (born 31 March 1970) is a former professional tennis player from Argentina.

== Career ==
A clay court specialist, Markus was a quarter-finalist in the Boys' Singles event at the 1987 French Open and at his best was ranked second in the Argentine junior rankings.

The right-handed player made the fourth round of the US Open in 1991, the furthest he would reach in a Grand Slam. Along the way he defeated Diego Nargiso, Stefano Pescosolido and Jan Siemerink.

At the 1992 French Open he memorably pushed second seed Stefan Edberg to five sets in the second round, but was unable to register a win.

Markus won France's Phillips Open in 1992, his only title win on the ATP World Tour. He upset top seed Peter Sampras in the semi-finals.

He participated in two Davis Cup ties for the Argentine team. He defeated Denmark's Morten Christensen in their 1992 World Group encounter and beat both Uruguayan singles players when Argentina faced Uruguay in 1994.

Since retiring, Markus has been involved in coaching. He was coach of David Nalbandian when he reached the final of the 2002 Wimbledon Championships and was coaching Nicolás Massú at the 2004 Athens Olympics, where the Chilean won two gold medals. In 2010, he became coach of Richard Gasquet but they would part company before the year ended.

== ATP career finals ==
=== Singles: 2 (1 title, 1 runner-up) ===
Legend Grand Slam Tournaments (0–0) ATP World Tour Finals (0–0) ATP Masters Series (0–0) ATP Championship Series (0–0) ATP World Series (1–1)	Finals by surface Hard (0–0) Clay (1–1) Grass (0–0) Carpet (0–0)	Finals by setting Outdoors (1–1) Indoors (0–0)

Result	W–L	Date	Tournament	Tier	Surface	Opponent	Score
Win	1–0	Apr 1992	Nice, France	World Series	Clay	(Spain) Javier Sánchez	6–4, 6–4
Loss	1–1	Apr 1994	Birmingham, United States	World Series	Clay	(Australia) Jason Stoltenberg	3–6, 4–6

=== Doubles: 1 (1 title) ===
Legend Grand Slam Tournaments (0–0) ATP World Tour Finals (0–0) ATP Masters Series (0–0) ATP Championship Series (0–0) ATP World Series (1–0)	Finals by surface Hard (0–0) Clay (1–0) Grass (0–0) Carpet (0–0)	Finals by setting Outdoors (1–0) Indoors (0–0)

Result	W–L	Date	Tournament	Tier	Surface	Partner	Opponents	Score
Win	1–0	Feb 1992	Maceió, Brazil	World Series	Clay	(United States) John Sobel	(Brazil) Ricardo Acioly (Brazil) Mauro Menezes	6–4, 1–6, 7–5

== ATP Challenger and ITF Futures Finals ==
=== Singles: 12 (5–7) ===
Legend ATP Challenger (5–7) ITF Futures (0–0)	Finals by surface Hard (0–1) Clay (5–6) Grass (0–0) Carpet (0–0)

Result	W–L	Date	Tournament	Tier	Surface	Opponent	Score
Win	1–0	Jul 1989	Santos, Brazil	Challenger	Clay	(Argentina) Christian Miniussi	6–2, 6–2
Loss	1–1	Jan 1991	Viña del Mar, Chile	Challenger	Clay	(Argentina) Gustavo Giussani	6–4, 2–6, 0–6
Win	2–1	Feb 1991	São Paulo, Brazil	Challenger	Clay	(Portugal) João Cunha-Silva	4–6, 6–4, 6–4
Loss	2–2	Apr 1991	Birmingham, United States	Challenger	Clay	(Argentina) Marcelo Ingaramo	6–3, 3–6, 2–6
Loss	2–3	May 1991	São Paulo, Brazil	Challenger	Hard	(Brazil) Fernando Roese	4–6, 3–6
Loss	2–4	Sep 1991	Bucharest, Romania	Challenger	Clay	(Uruguay) Marcelo Filippini	3–6, 4–6
Loss	2–5	Nov 1991	São Paulo, Brazil	Challenger	Clay	(Ecuador) Raúl Viver	6–7, 6–3, 3–6
Win	3–5	Jul 1992	Salerno, Italy	Challenger	Clay	(Spain) Emilio Benfele Álvarez	7–6, 6–1
Loss	3–6	Feb 1993	Punta del Este, Uruguay	Challenger	Clay	(Argentina) Javier Frana	6–4, 2–6, 6–7
Win	4–6	Aug 1993	Geneva, Switzerland	Challenger	Clay	(Slovakia) Karol Kučera	3–6, 6–2, 7–5
Loss	4–7	Sep 1993	Oporto, Portugal	Challenger	Clay	(Argentina) Franco Davín	4–6, 3–6
Win	5–7	Apr 1994	São Paulo, Brazil	Challenger	Clay	(Argentina) Hernán Gumy	2–6, 6–4, 6–4

=== Doubles: 4 (0–4) ===
Legend ATP Challenger (0–4) ITF Futures (0–0)	Finals by surface Hard (0–0) Clay (0–4) Grass (0–0) Carpet (0–0)

Result	W–L	Date	Tournament	Tier	Surface	Partner	Opponents	Score
Loss	0–1	Aug 1990	São Paulo, Brazil	Challenger	Clay	(Brazil) João Zwetsch	(Brazil) Cássio Motta (Argentina) Javier Frana	3–6, 6–3, 1–6
Loss	0–2	Jan 1991	Viña del Mar, Chile	Challenger	Clay	(Argentina) Francisco Yunis	(Cuba) Juan-Antonio Pino-Perez (Cuba) Mario Tabares	3–6, 2–6
Loss	0–3	Jul 1992	Salerno, Italy	Challenger	Clay	(Argentina) Daniel Orsanic	(Australia) Andrew Kratzmann (Australia) Roger Rasheed	4–6, 3–6
Loss	0–4	Oct 1992	Buenos Aires, Argentina	Challenger	Clay	(Argentina) Horacio de la Peña	(Argentina) Pablo Albano (Argentina) Javier Frana	6–2, 3–6, 4–6

== Performance timeline ==
Key
W	F	SF	QF	#R	RR	Q#	DNQ	A	NH

(W) winner; (F) finalist; (SF) semifinalist; (QF) quarterfinalist; (#R) rounds 4, 3, 2, 1; (RR) round-robin stage; (Q#) qualification round; (DNQ) did not qualify; (A) absent; (NH) not held; (SR) strike rate (events won / competed); (W–L) win–loss record.

=== Singles ===
Tournament	1990	1991	1992	1993	1994	SR	W–L	Win%
Grand Slam tournaments
Australian Open	A	A	A	1R	A	0 / 1	0–1	0%
French Open	A	3R	2R	3R	1R	0 / 4	5–4	56%
Wimbledon	A	A	1R	A	A	0 / 1	0–1	0%
US Open	A	4R	2R	A	1R	0 / 3	4–3	57%
Win–loss	0–0	5–2	2–3	2–2	0–2	0 / 9	9–9	50%
ATP Masters Series
Indian Wells	A	A	A	1R	A	0 / 1	0–1	0%
Miami	A	A	1R	1R	A	0 / 2	0–2	0%
Monte Carlo	2R	A	A	1R	A	0 / 2	0–2	0%
Rome	A	A	1R	A	A	0 / 1	0–1	0%
Hamburg	A	A	A	1R	A	0 / 1	0–1	0%
Paris	A	A	1R	A	A	0 / 1	0–1	0%
Win–loss	0–1	0–0	0–3	0–4	0–0	0 / 8	0–8	0%
