= Marcelo Ingaramo =

Argentine tennis player

- Country (sports): Argentina
- Residence: Buenos Aires
- Born: 13 October 1962 (age 62); Córdoba, Argentina
- Height: 1.78 m (5 ft 10 in)
- Turned pro: 1982
- Plays: Left-handed
- Prize money: $276,559

Singles
- Career record: 33-51
- Career titles: 0
- Highest ranking: No. 67 (24 Feb 1986)

Grand Slam singles results
- French Open: 1R (1985, 1986, 1990, 1991)
- Wimbledon: 1R (1986)
- US Open: 3R (1988)

Doubles
- Career record: 25-49
- Career titles: 0
- Highest ranking: No. 134 (26 Aug 1991)

Grand Slam doubles results
- French Open: 1R (1988)

Marcelo Ingaramo (born 13 October 1962) is a former professional tennis player from Argentina.

== Career ==
Ingaramo made his Grand Slam debut in the 1985 French Open and was beaten in five sets by countryman Eduardo Bengoechea in the opening round. At Wimbledon in 1986 he was again on the wrong side of a five set match, losing 6–8 in the fifth set to Hans Schwaier. He broke through for his first at the 1986 US Open, his four Grand Slam appearance, with a win over Luiz Mattar. The Argentine was defeated in the second round by sixth seed Yannick Noah. His best showing came in the 1988 US Open, winning matches over Horacio de la Peña and Andrew Burrow. He was due to meet Darren Cahill in the third round by forfeited the match in order to return to Argentina for the birth of his child. His only doubles appearance came at the French Open in 1988, partnering Alberto Mancini. They lost to the American pairing of Eric Korita and Jon Levine in round one.

The left hander competed on the Grand Prix tennis circuit and subsequent ATP Tour from 1984 to 1994. In his first Grand Prix appearance, at Barcelona, Ingaramo upset Guillermo Vilas. He made the quarter-finals at Buenos Aires, Florence and Madrid in 1985 but his best performance that year was in the Washington Classic, where he again defeated Vilas and also had a win over world number 13 Miloslav Mečíř en route to the semi-finals. In 1986 he was a quarter-finalist at Madrid and St Vincent and also made a semi-final appearance at St Vincent two years later. His only tour final in 1987, was in the doubles, at Bari, partnering Roberto Azar. The pair were defeated in the final by Christer Allgårdh and Ulf Stenlund.

== Grand Prix career finals ==
=== Doubles: 1 (0–1) ===
Result	W/L	Date	Tournament	Surface	Partner	Opponents	Score
Loss	0–1	Apr 1987	Bari, Italy	Clay	(Argentina) Roberto Azar	(Sweden) Christer Allgårdh (Sweden) Ulf Stenlund	3–6, 3–6

== Challenger titles ==
=== Singles: (3) ===
No.	Year	Tournament	Surface	Opponent	Score
1.	1991	Birmingham, United States	Clay	(Argentina) Gabriel Markus	3–6, 6–4, 6–2
2.	1992	Santiago, Chile	Clay	(Chile) Sergio Cortés	6–4, 6–1
3.	1993	Vina Del Mar, Chile	Clay	(Colombia) Mauricio Hadad	6–1, 6–4

=== Doubles: (2) ===
No.	Year	Tournament	Surface	Partner	Opponents	Score
1.	1990	Hossegor, France	Clay	(Spain) Marcos Aurelio Gorriz	(Argentina) Eduardo Bengoechea (Belgium) Eduardo Masso	7–5, 6–2
2.	1991	Santiago, Chile	Clay	(Argentina) Gustavo Garetto	(Chile) Hans Gildemeister (Chile) Felipe Rivera	6–2, 4–6, 6–4
