= Nicolás Becerra =

Argentine tennis player

- Full name: Nicolás Martín Becerra
- Country (sports): Argentina
- Born: 6 November 1969 (age 55); Mendoza, Argentina
- Height: 6 ft 1 in (185 cm)
- Plays: Right-handed
- Prize money: $30,514

Singles
- Career record: 0–2
- Highest ranking: No. 191 (8 Jun 1992)

Doubles
- Career record: 0–1
- Highest ranking: No. 318 (4 May 1992)

Nicolás Martín Becerra (born 6 November 1969) is an Argentine former professional tennis player. A native of Mendoza, he is the son of Nicolás Eduardo Becerra, who served as Attorney General of Argentina from 1997 to 2004.

Becerra played on the professional tour in the early 1990s. He had a career high singles ranking of 191, which he reached in 1992, with ATP Tour main draw appearance that year at Maceio and Johannesburg.

Following his tennis career he continued to compete in ITF seniors tournaments and in 2004 became number one in the world for his age category. He is an attorney by profession.
