= Pajuçara =

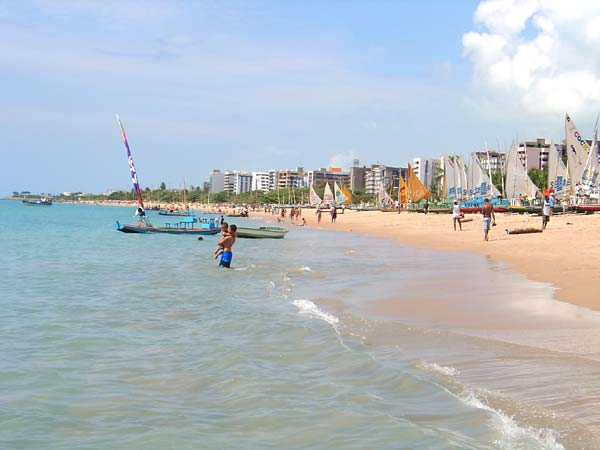
Pajuçara beach, in Maceió.

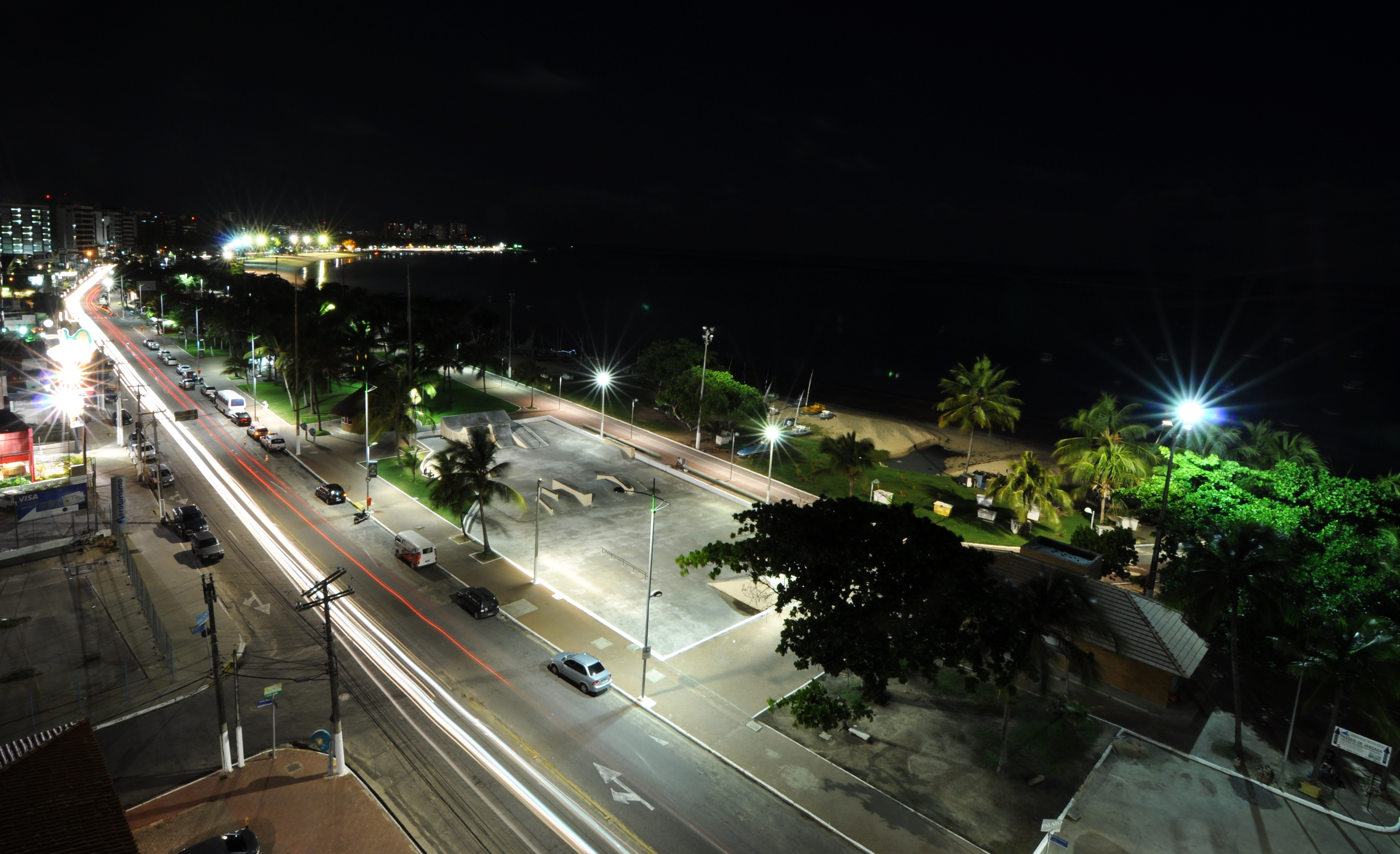
Night-time view of Pajuçara Beach, Maceió, Brazil.

Pajuçara is a beach and a neighbourhood in Maceió, capital of Alagoas, in Brazil. This beach is approximately 2km from downtown. It is a calm water beach thanks to the reefs, which make it safe for swimming, especially for children. Near the arts and crafts fair in Pajuçara is also where the rafts leave for the natural pools formed by coral reefs, where the tourist will find floating bars.

== Geography ==
Pajuçara is localised in the South Zone.

=== Climate ===
Pajuçara has a typical tropical climate, with warm to hot temperatures and high relative humidity all throughout the year. However, these conditions are relieved by a near absence of extreme temperatures and pleasant trade winds blowing from the ocean. January is the warmest month, with mean maxima of 31°C and minima of 22°C; July experiences the coolest temperatures, with means of 26°C and 15°C. The absolute maximum and minimum are respectively 33°C and 11,3°C.

=== Vegetation ===
Pajuçara has a Tropical forest. Rainforests are characterized by high rainfall, with definitions setting minimum normal annual rainfall between 2,000 mm (about 78 inches or 2 meters) and 1700 mm (about 67 inches). The soil can be poor because high rainfall tends to leach out soluble nutrients. There are several common characteristics of tropical rainforest trees. Tropical rainforest species frequently possess one or more of the following attributes not commonly seen in trees of higher latitudes or trees in drier conditions on the same latitude.

== Demographics ==
According to the 2006 census, the racial makeup of Ponta Verde district inhabitants was 95% White people and 5% Black people. People of Latin Europe descent form the largest ethnic groups in the district. Predominantly Roman Catholics religion and Portuguese language.

== Economy ==
Pajuçara is a vibrant tourist coastal area with Hotels and Pousadas (hostels), bars, nightclubs, pubs, good restaurants, etc. Tourism is the most important segment in the district, because Pajuçara district has beautifuls beaches with their calm and blue waters, their reefs and corals. Thanks to the "barracas"(traditional restaurants/bars built on the beach sand, just close by the sea waters and resembling huge Amazonian-Indian straw huts), thanks to the modern buildings facing the sea (luxurious hotels and residential buildings), thanks to the running and cycling tracks and row of benches that follow the coastline like at Copacabana beach in Rio or Miami beach in the United States, thanks to the beach volley friendly practice and beach volley tournaments, and thanks to its beautiful squares and playgrounds, Pajuçara is a place of entertainment, healthy activities, cultural activities, meeting, and nightlife.
