= John Sobel =

American tennis player

- Country (sports): United States
- Residence: Miami, Florida
- Born: February 15, 1964 (age 62) New York City, United States
- Height: 5 ft 8 in (1.73 m)
- Turned pro: 1986
- Plays: Right-handed
- Prize money: $91,012

Singles
- Career record: 2-8
- Career titles: 0; 0 Challenger, 0 Futuers
- Highest ranking: No. 307 (9 July 1990)

Grand Slam singles results
- Australian Open: Q1 (1992)
- Wimbledon: Q2 (1988)

Doubles
- Career record: 23-39
- Career titles: 1; 2 Challenger, 0 Futuers
- Highest ranking: No. 107 (10 February 1992)

Grand Slam doubles results
- Australian Open: 1R (1992)
- Wimbledon: Q3 (1992)
- US Open: 1R (1990)

Grand Slam mixed doubles results
- French Open: 1R (1990)
- Last updated on: 9 May 2022.

John Sobel (born February 15, 1964) is an American former professional tennis player.

== Career ==
Sobel was seen mostly on the doubles circuit. He appeared in three Grand Slam events during his career. In the men's doubles he played with Ville Jansson at the 1990 US Open and Slobodan Živojinović in the 1992 Australian Open. As a mixed doubles player he took part in the 1990 French Open, partnering Lise Gregory. On each occasion, Sobel and his partner were eliminated in the opening round.

The highlight of his career was winning the doubles title at the 1992 Maceió Open, with Gabriel Markus. He also reached the semi-final stage of four Grand Prix/ATP tournaments, Madrid in 1989 with Eduardo Furusho, Kiawah Island in 1990 partnering Sven Salumaa, Charlotte in 1991 with Jimmy Arias and Moscow in 1991 partnering Josef Čihák.

== ATP career finals ==
=== Doubles: 1 (1 title) ===
Legend Grand Slam Tournaments (0–0) ATP World Tour Finals (0–0) ATP Masters Series (0–0) ATP Championship Series (0–0) ATP World Series (1–0)	Finals by surface Hard (0–0) Clay (1–0) Grass (0–0) Carpet (0–0)	Finals by setting Outdoors (1–0) Indoors (0–0)

Result	W–L	Date	Tournament	Tier	Surface	Partner	Opponents	Score
Win	1–0	Feb 1992	Maceió, Brazil	World Series	Clay	(Argentina) Gabriel Markus	(Brazil) Ricardo Acioly (Brazil) Mauro Menezes	6–4, 1–6, 7–5

== ATP Challenger and ITF Futures finals ==
=== Doubles: 3 (2–1) ===
Legend ATP Challenger (2–1) ITF Futures (0–0)	Finals by surface Hard (1–0) Clay (1–1) Grass (0–0) Carpet (0–0)

Result	W–L	Date	Tournament	Tier	Surface	Partner	Opponents	Score
Win	1-0	Nov 1988	Guangzhou, China	Challenger	Hard	(United States) Steve Devries	(United States) Joseph Russell (United Kingdom) Andrew Sproule	7–6, 4–6, 6–4
Win	2-0	Jul 1989	Chicoutimi, Canada	Challenger	Clay	(United States) Howard Endelman	(Germany) Karsten Braasch (Germany) Willi Otten	3–6, 6–4, 6–4
Loss	2-1	Aug 1991	Pescara, Italy	Challenger	Clay	(Sweden) Johan Donar	(Czech Republic) Josef Čihák (Czech Republic) Tomas Anzari	3–6, 4–6
