= Tomás Carbonell (tennis) =

Spanish tennis player (born 1968)

- Full name: Tomás Carbonell Lladó
- Country (sports): Spain
- Residence: Cabrera de Mar, Spain
- Born: 7 August 1968 (age 57); Barcelona, Spain
- Height: 1.78 m (5 ft 10 in)
- Turned pro: 1987
- Retired: 2001
- Plays: Right-handed (two-handed backhand)
- Coach: Gabriel Urpí
- Prize money: $3,157,584

Singles
- Career record: 194–223
- Career titles: 2
- Highest ranking: No. 40 (15 April 1996)

Grand Slam singles results
- Australian Open: 2R (1990, 1993, 1997)
- French Open: 3R (1991, 1995)
- Wimbledon: 3R (1989, 1995)
- US Open: 3R (1990)

Doubles
- Career record: 349–297
- Career titles: 22
- Highest ranking: No. 22 (9 October 1995)

Grand Slam doubles results
- Australian Open: 2R (1994)
- French Open: SF (1999, 2000)
- Wimbledon: 2R (1991, 1996, 1999, 2001)
- US Open: QF (1990)

Other doubles tournaments
- Olympic Games: QF (1996)

Grand Slam mixed doubles results
- French Open: W (2001)
- Wimbledon: 2R (2001)
- US Open: 1R (1998, 1999, 2000)

Tomás Carbonell Lladó (born 7 August 1968) is a former professional tennis player from Spain.

Carbonell won 2 singles and 22 doubles titles on the ATP Tour in his career. He won the French Open in 2001 in mixed doubles with Virginia Ruano Pascual and twice reached the semifinals of the French Open in men's doubles, in 1999 with Pablo Albano, and in 2000 with Martín García. Carbonell reached his highest singles ranking of World No. 40 on 15 April 1996, and his highest doubles ranking of World No. 22 on 9 October 1995. He retired from the tour in 2001.

== Personal life ==
Carbonell's son Tomy Carbonell is a professional footballer.

== Junior Grand Slam finals ==
=== Doubles: 2 (2 titles) ===
Result	Year	Tournament	Surface	Partner	Opponents	Score
Win	1986	Wimbledon	Grass	(Czech Republic) Petr Korda	(Hong Kong) Shane Barr (Canada) Hubert Karrasch	6–1, 6–1
Win	1986	US Open	Hard	(Spain) Javier Sánchez	(United States) Jeff Tarango (United States) David Wheaton	6–4, 1–6, 6–1

== ATP career finals ==
=== Singles: 4 (2 titles, 2 runner-ups) ===
Legend Grand Slam Tournaments (0–0) ATP World Tour Finals (0–0) ATP World Tour Masters Series (0–0) ATP Championship Series (0–0) ATP World Series (2–2)	Finals by surface Hard (0–0) Clay (2–2) Grass (0–0) Carpet (0–0)	Finals by setting Outdoors (2–2) Indoors (0–0)

Result	W–L	Date	Tournament	Tier	Surface	Opponent	Score
Win	1–0	Feb 1992	Maceió, Brazil	World Series	Clay	(Argentina) Christian Miniussi	7–6^{(14–12)}, 5–7, 6–2
Loss	1–1	Jul 1992	Båstad, Sweden	World Series	Clay	(Sweden) Magnus Gustafsson	7–5, 5–7, 4–6
Loss	1–2	Jun 1994	St. Pölten, Austria	World Series	Clay	(Austria) Thomas Muster	6–4, 2–6, 4–6
Win	2–2	Mar 1996	Casablanca, Morocco	World Series	Clay	(Austria) Gilbert Schaller	7–5, 1–6, 6–2

=== Doubles: 32 (22 titles, 10 runner-ups) ===
Legend Grand Slam Tournaments (0–0) ATP World Tour Finals (0–0) ATP Masters Series (0–0) ATP Championship Series (1–2) ATP World Series (21–8)	Finals by surface Hard (0–4) Clay (22–4) Grass (0–0) Carpet (0–2)	Finals by setting Outdoors (22–7) Indoors (0–3)

Result	W–L	Date	Tournament	Tier	Surface	Partner	Opponents	Score
Loss	0–1	Nov 1987	São Paulo, Brazil	Grand Prix	Hard	(Spain) Sergio Casal	(Israel) Gilad Bloom (Spain) Javier Sánchez	3–6, 7–6, 4–6
Win	1–1	Nov 1987	Buenos Aires, Argentina	Grand Prix	Clay	(Spain) Sergio Casal	(United States) Jay Berger (Argentina) Horacio de la Peña	walkover
Cancelled	1–1	Jul 1989	Hilversum, Netherlands	Grand Prix	Clay	(Uruguay) Diego Pérez	(Netherlands) Mark Koevermans (Netherlands) Paul Haarhuis	Abandoned
Win	2–1	Sep 1989	Madrid, Spain	Grand Prix	Clay	(Spain) Carlos Costa	(Czechoslovakia) Tomáš Šmíd (Spain) Francisco Clavet	7–5, 6–3
Win	3–1	Oct 1989	Bordeaux, France	Grand Prix	Clay	(Peru) Carlos di Laura	(Mexico) Agustín Moreno (Peru) Jaime Yzaga	6–4, 6–4
Win	4–1	Jun 1990	Genoa, Italy	World Series	Clay	(Germany) Udo Riglewski	(Italy) Cristiano Caratti (Italy) Federico Mordegan	7–6, 7–6
Win	5–1	Sep 1990	Bordeaux, France	World Series	Clay	(Czech Republic) Libor Pimek	(Iran) Mansour Bahrami (France) Yannick Noah	6–3, 6–7, 6–2
Loss	5–2	Nov 1990	Itaparica, Brazil	World Series	Hard	(Spain) Marcos Aurelio Górriz	(Brazil) Mauro Menezes (Brazil) Fernando Roese	6–7, 5–7
Win	6–2	Aug 1991	Kitzbühel, Austria	World Series	Clay	(Spain) Francisco Roig	(Peru) Pablo Arraya (Ukraine) Dimitri Poliakov	6–7, 6–2, 6–4
Win	7–2	Jul 1992	Båstad, Sweden	World Series	Clay	(Argentina) Christian Miniussi	(Sweden) Christian Bergström (Sweden) Magnus Gustafsson	6–4, 7–5
Win	8–2	Oct 1992	Athens, Greece	World Series	Clay	(Spain) Francisco Roig	(Uruguay) Marcelo Filippini (Netherlands) Mark Koevermans	6–3, 6–4
Win	9–2	May 1993	Madrid, Spain	World Series	Clay	(Spain) Carlos Costa	(United States) Luke Jensen (United States) Scott Melville	7–6, 6–2
Win	10–2	Jun 1993	Florence, Italy	World Series	Clay	(Czech Republic) Libor Pimek	(United States) Greg Van Emburgh (Netherlands) Mark Koevermans	7–6, 2–6, 6–1
Win	11–2	Nov 1993	Buenos Aires, Argentina	World Series	Clay	(Spain) Carlos Costa	(Spain) Sergio Casal (Spain) Emilio Sánchez	6–4, 6–4
Loss	11–3	Oct 1994	Santiago, Chile	World Series	Clay	(Spain) Francisco Roig	(Czech Republic) Karel Nováček (Sweden) Mats Wilander	6–4, 6–7, 6–7
Loss	11–4	Nov 1994	Buenos Aires, Argentina	World Series	Clay	(Spain) Francisco Roig	(Spain) Sergio Casal (Spain) Emilio Sánchez	3–6, 2–6
Loss	11–5	Feb 1995	Dubai, United Arab Emirates	World Series	Hard	(Spain) Francisco Roig	(Canada) Grant Connell (United States) Patrick Galbraith	2–6, 6–4, 3–6
Loss	11–6	Mar 1995	Rotterdam, Netherlands	World Series	Carpet	(Spain) Francisco Roig	(Czech Republic) Martin Damm (Sweden) Anders Järryd	3–6, 2–6
Win	12–6	Mar 1995	Casablanca, Morocco	World Series	Clay	(Spain) Francisco Roig	(Portugal) Emanuel Couto (Portugal) João Cunha e Silva	6–4, 6–1
Win	13–6	Jun 1995	Oporto, Portugal	World Series	Clay	(Spain) Francisco Roig	(Spain) Jordi Arrese (Spain) Àlex Corretja	6–3, 7–6
Win	14–6	Jul 1995	Stuttgart, Germany	Championship Series	Clay	(Spain) Francisco Roig	(South Africa) Ellis Ferreira (Netherlands) Jan Siemerink	3–6, 6–3, 6–4
Win	15–6	Oct 1995	Valencia, Spain	World Series	Clay	(Spain) Francisco Roig	(Netherlands) Tom Kempers (United States) Jack Waite	7–5, 6–3
Loss	15–7	Mar 1996	Casablanca, Morocco	World Series	Clay	(Spain) Francisco Roig	(Czech Republic) Jiří Novák (Czech Republic) David Rikl	6–7, 3–6
Win	16–7	Apr 1996	Estoril, Portugal	World Series	Clay	(Spain) Francisco Roig	(Netherlands) Tom Nijssen (United States) Greg Van Emburgh	6–3, 6–2
Loss	16–8	Jul 1996	Stuttgart, Germany	Championship Series	Clay	(Spain) Francisco Roig	(Czech Republic) Libor Pimek (South Africa) Byron Talbot	2–6, 7–5, 4–6
Loss	16–9	Feb 1998	Antwerp, Belgium	Championship Series	Hard	(Spain) Francisco Roig	(South Africa) Wayne Ferreira (Russia) Yevgeny Kafelnikov	5–7, 6–3, 2–6
Loss	16–10	Oct 1998	Lyon, France	International Series	Carpet	(Spain) Francisco Roig	(France) Olivier Delaître (France) Fabrice Santoro	2–6, 2–6
Win	17–10	Apr 1999	Estoril, Portugal	World Series	Clay	(United States) Donald Johnson	(Czech Republic) Jiří Novák (Czech Republic) David Rikl	6–3, 2–6, 6–1
Win	18–10	Sep 1999	Majorca, Spain	World Series	Clay	(Argentina) Lucas Arnold Ker	(Spain) Alberto Berasategui (Spain) Francisco Roig	6–1, 6–4
Win	19–10	Oct 2000	Palermo, Italy	International Series	Clay	(Argentina) Martín García	(Argentina) Pablo Albano (Germany) Marc-Kevin Goellner	walkover
Win	20–10	Feb 2001	Viña del Mar, Chile	International Series	Clay	(Argentina) Lucas Arnold Ker	(Argentina) Mariano Hood (Argentina) Sebastián Prieto	6–4, 2–6, 6–3
Win	21–10	Feb 2001	Buenos Aires, Argentina	International Series	Clay	(Argentina) Lucas Arnold Ker	(Argentina) Mariano Hood (Argentina) Sebastián Prieto	5–7, 7–5, 7–6^{(7–5)}
Win	22–10	Sep 2001	Palermo, Italy	International Series	Clay	(Argentina) Daniel Orsanic	(Italy) Enzo Artoni (Spain) Emilio Benfele	6–2, 2–6, 6–2

== ATP Challenger and ITF Futures finals ==
=== Singles: 6 (2–4) ===
Legend ATP Challenger (2–4) ITF Futures (0–0)	Finals by surface Hard (0–1) Clay (2–3) Grass (0–0) Carpet (0–0)

Result	W–L	Date	Tournament	Tier	Surface	Opponent	Score
Loss	0–1	Apr 1989	Lisbon, Portugal	Challenger	Clay	(Russia) Andrei Cherkasov	6–7, 3–6
Win	1–1	Jun 1989	Salou, Spain	Challenger	Clay	(Sweden) Nicklas Utgren	6–2, 6–4
Loss	1–2	Mar 1992	Zaragoza, Spain	Challenger	Hard	(Brazil) Luiz Mattar	5–7, 6–3, 2–6
Win	2–2	Sep 1993	Venice, Italy	Challenger	Clay	(Austria) Gilbert Schaller	6–4, 0–6, 6–1
Loss	2–3	May 1994	Ljubljana, Slovenia	Challenger	Clay	(Austria) Horst Skoff	6–0, 4–6, 6–7
Loss	2–4	Jul 1995	Poznań, Poland	Challenger	Clay	(Spain) Jordi Arrese	4–6, 2–6

=== Doubles: 11 (8–3) ===
Legend ATP Challenger (8–3) ITF Futures (0–0)	Finals by surface Hard (1–0) Clay (7–3) Grass (0–0) Carpet (0–0)

Result	W–L	Date	Tournament	Tier	Surface	Partner	Opponents	Score
Win	1–0	Mar 1989	Cairo, Egypt	Challenger	Clay	(Spain) Jordi Arrese	(Spain) Carlos Costa (Spain) Francisco Roig	7–6, 6–3
Win	2–0	Apr 1989	Oporto, Portugal	Challenger	Clay	(Spain) Carlos Costa	(Netherlands) Paul Haarhuis (Belgium) Denis Langaskens	6–4, 6–3
Win	3–0	Apr 1989	Lisbon, Portugal	Challenger	Clay	(Spain) Carlos Costa	(Spain) Marcos-Aurelio Gorriz-Bonhora (Spain) Vicente Solves	6–4, 6–1
Loss	3–1	Apr 1990	Estoril, Portugal	Challenger	Clay	(Germany) Udo Riglewski	(Germany) Karsten Braasch (Netherlands) Hendrik-Jan Davids	7–5, 5–7, 2–6
Win	4–1	Jul 1991	Tampere, Finland	Challenger	Clay	(Spain) Marcos Aurelio Górriz	(South Africa) David Adams (Russia) Andrei Olhovskiy	6–4, 6–2
Win	5–1	Nov 1996	Andorra la Vella, Andorra	Challenger	Hard	(Spain) Francisco Roig	(Serbia and Montenegro) Nebojsa Djordjevic (North Macedonia) Aleksandar Kitinov	6–2, 4–6, 6–1
Loss	5–2	Apr 1997	Mapoli, Italy	Challenger	Clay	(Spain) Francisco Roig	(Belgium) Tom Vanhoudt (North Macedonia) Aleksandar Kitinov	6–7, 4–6
Win	6–2	Oct 1997	Cairo, Egypt	Challenger	Clay	(Spain) Francisco Roig	(Australia) Wayne Arthurs (Israel) Eyal Ran	6–3, 6–3
Win	7–2	Jun 1998	Braunschweig, Germany	Challenger	Clay	(Spain) Francisco Roig	(Spain) Joan Balcells (Portugal) Emanuel Couto	6–2, 7–6
Loss	7–3	Jun 1999	Braunschweig, Germany	Challenger	Clay	(Serbia and Montenegro) Nebojša Đorđević	(Spain) Albert Portas (Spain) Germán Puentes	4–6, 7–6^{(7–3)}, 3–6
Win	8–3	Oct 2000	Barcelona, Spain	Challenger	Clay	(Spain) Albert Portas	(Germany) Joan Balcells (Germany) Jens Knippschild	5–7, 6–1, 6–4

== Performance timelines ==
Key
W	F	SF	QF	#R	RR	Q#	DNQ	A	NH

(W) winner; (F) finalist; (SF) semifinalist; (QF) quarterfinalist; (#R) rounds 4, 3, 2, 1; (RR) round-robin stage; (Q#) qualification round; (DNQ) did not qualify; (A) absent; (NH) not held; (SR) strike rate (events won / competed); (W–L) win–loss record.

=== Singles ===
Tournament	1987	1988	1989	1990	1991	1992	1993	1994	1995	1996	1997	1998	1999	SR	W–L	Win %
Grand Slam tournaments
Australian Open	A	A	A	2R	A	A	2R	1R	A	A	2R	A	A	0 / 4	3–4	43%
French Open	2R	A	1R	1R	3R	1R	2R	1R	3R	2R	A	A	A	0 / 9	7–9	44%
Wimbledon	A	A	3R	1R	1R	1R	1R	1R	3R	2R	A	A	A	0 / 8	5–8	38%
US Open	A	1R	1R	3R	1R	1R	1R	2R	A	1R	A	A	A	0 / 8	3–8	27%
Win–loss	1–1	0–1	2–3	3–4	2–3	0–3	2–4	1–4	4–2	2–3	1–1	0–0	0–0	0 / 29	18–29	38%
ATP Masters Series
Indian Wells	A	A	A	A	2R	A	1R	A	A	A	A	A	A	0 / 2	1–2	33%
Miami	A	A	A	1R	4R	2R	1R	A	A	A	A	A	Q1	0 / 4	4–4	50%
Monte Carlo	A	A	A	2R	A	2R	A	Q2	Q1	2R	A	A	A	0 / 3	3–3	50%
Hamburg	A	A	3R	A	1R	A	A	A	1R	1R	A	Q2	A	0 / 4	2–4	33%
Rome	A	A	A	2R	1R	2R	A	1R	2R	1R	A	A	A	0 / 6	3–6	33%
Canada	A	A	A	A	A	A	A	A	A	1R	A	A	A	0 / 1	0–1	0%
Stuttgart	A	A	A	A	A	A	A	A	A	Q1	A	A	A	0 / 0	0–0	–
Paris	A	A	A	A	A	A	A	A	A	Q1	A	A	A	0 / 0	0–0	–
Win–loss	0–0	0–0	2–1	2–3	4–4	3–3	0–2	0–1	1–2	1–4	0–0	0–0	0–0	0 / 20	13–20	39%

=== Doubles ===
Tournament	1987	1988	1989	1990	1991	1992	1993	1994	1995	1996	1997	1998	1999	2000	2001	SR	W–L	Win %
Grand Slam tournaments
Australian Open	A	A	A	1R	A	A	1R	2R	A	A	1R	A	A	A	A	0 / 4	1–4	20%
French Open	2R	1R	QF	1R	2R	3R	3R	1R	1R	1R	QF	2R	SF	SF	2R	0 / 15	22–15	59%
Wimbledon	A	A	1R	A	2R	1R	A	1R	1R	2R	A	1R	2R	1R	2R	0 / 10	4–10	29%
US Open	A	2R	2R	QF	1R	1R	1R	2R	A	2R	A	2R	2R	1R	1R	0 / 12	9–12	43%
Win–loss	1–1	1–2	4–3	3–3	2–3	2–3	2–3	2–4	0–2	2–3	3–2	2–3	6–3	4–3	2–3	0 / 41	36–41	47%
ATP Masters Series
Indian Wells	A	A	A	A	1R	A	1R	A	A	A	A	A	1R	A	A	0 / 3	0–3	0%
Miami	A	A	A	3R	1R	1R	1R	A	A	A	A	A	2R	2R	2R	0 / 7	4–7	36%
Monte Carlo	1R	A	A	1R	A	2R	A	1R	2R	A	2R	QF	A	QF	1R	0 / 9	7–9	44%
Hamburg	A	A	2R	A	1R	A	A	A	2R	SF	1R	SF	2R	2R	1R	0 / 9	10–9	53%
Rome	A	2R	1R	2R	QF	1R	A	1R	SF	1R	A	1R	1R	2R	1R	0 / 12	8–12	40%
Canada	A	A	A	A	A	A	A	A	A	1R	A	A	A	A	A	0 / 1	0–1	0%
Cincinnati	A	A	A	A	A	A	A	A	A	A	A	A	A	2R	A	0 / 1	1–1	50%
Stuttgart	A	A	A	A	A	A	A	A	A	QF	QF	A	A	1R	A	0 / 3	5–3	63%
Paris	A	A	QF	A	A	A	A	A	A	2R	2R	A	A	A	A	0 / 3	3–3	50%
Win–loss	0–1	1–1	2–3	3–3	2–4	1–3	0–2	0–2	5–3	6–5	5–4	5–3	2–4	6–6	0–4	0 / 48	38–48	44%

=== Mixed doubles ===
Tournament	1987	1988	1989	1990	1991	1992	1993	1994	1995	1996	1997	1998	1999	2000	2001	SR	W–L	Win %
Grand Slam tournaments
Australian Open	A	A	A	A	A	A	A	A	A	A	A	A	A	A	A	0 / 0	0–0	–
French Open	1R	A	2R	A	A	A	A	A	A	A	A	A	3R	2R	W	1 / 5	7–4	64%
Wimbledon	A	A	A	A	A	A	A	A	A	A	A	A	A	A	2R	0 / 1	1–1	50%
US Open	A	A	A	A	A	A	A	A	A	A	A	1R	1R	1R	A	0 / 3	0–3	0%
Win–loss	0–1	0–0	1–1	0–0	0–0	0–0	0–0	0–0	0–0	0–0	0–0	0–1	1–2	0–2	6–1	1 / 9	8–8	50%
