= 1988 Torneo Godó – Doubles =

Doubles
- 1988 Torneo Godó

Final
- Champions: (Spain) Sergio Casal (Spain) Emilio Sánchez
- Runners-up: (Switzerland) Claudio Mezzadri (Uruguay) Diego Pérez
- Score: 6–4, 6–3

Details
- Draw: 28
- Seeds: 8

Events
Singles	Doubles
← 1987 ·	Barcelona Open	· 1989 →

Javier Frana and Christian Miniussi were the defending champions, but Frana did not compete this year. Miniussi teamed up with Alberto Mancini and lost in the first round to José López-Maeso and Alberto Tous.

Sergio Casal and Emilio Sánchez won the title by defeating Claudio Mezzadri and Diego Pérez 6–4, 6–3 in the final.

== Seeds ==
The first four seeds received a bye to the second round.

1. (Mexico) Jorge Lozano / (United States) Todd Witsken (quarterfinals)
2. (Spain) Sergio Casal / (Spain) Emilio Sánchez (champions)
3. (Denmark) Michael Mortensen / (Czechoslovakia) Tomáš Šmíd (quarterfinals)
4. (Switzerland) Claudio Mezzadri / (Uruguay) Diego Pérez (final)
5. (Argentina) Alberto Mancini / (Argentina) Christian Miniussi (first round)
6. (Spain) Tomás Carbonell / (Spain) Javier Sánchez (semifinals)
7. (Austria) Thomas Muster / (Austria) Horst Skoff (second round)
8. (Sweden) Ronnie Båthman / (Brazil) Cássio Motta (quarterfinals)

== Draw ==
=== Key ===
- Q = Qualifier
- WC = Wild card
- LL = Lucky loser
- Alt = Alternate
- ITF = ITF entry
- PR = Protected ranking
- SR = Special ranking
- SE = Special exempt
- JE = Junior exempt
- JR = Junior Accelerator Programme entrant
- CO = College Accelerator Programme entrant
- NG = Next Gen Accelerator Program entrant
- w/o = Walkover
- r = Retired
- d = Defaulted

=== Finals ===
Semifinals
(Peru) Pablo Arraya (Argentina) Horacio de la Peña	3	3
4	(Switzerland) Claudio Mezzadri (Uruguay) Diego Pérez	6	6
6	(Spain) Tomás Carbonell (Spain) Javier Sánchez	2	6
2	(Spain) Sergio Casal (Spain) Emilio Sánchez	6	7

Final
4	(Switzerland) Claudio Mezzadri (Uruguay) Diego Pérez	4	3
2	(Spain) Sergio Casal (Spain) Emilio Sánchez	6	6

=== Top half ===
First round
(Argentina) G Luza (Argentina) G Pérez Roldán	w/o
(Spain) JL Aparisi (Spain) V Solves
(Chile) S Cortés (Argentina) G Giussani	2	4
(Peru) P Arraya (Argentina) H de la Peña	6	6
(Spain) Fernando Castella (Spain) V López Morón	1	2
7	(Austria) T Muster (Austria) H Skoff	6	6
(Haiti) R Agénor (France) T Champion	6	3
(Spain) F Clavet (Ecuador) R Viver	7	6
(Cuba) J Pino (Cuba) M Tabares	6	3
(France) J Potier (France) T Tulasne	7	6
(Spain) J López-Maeso (Spain) A Tous	7	6
5	(Argentina) A Mancini (Argentina) C Miniussi	6	4

Second round
1	(Mexico) J Lozano (United States) T Witsken	6	4	6
(Argentina) G Luza (Argentina) G Pérez Roldán	1	6	1
(Peru) P Arraya (Argentina) H de la Peña	4	6	6
7	(Austria) T Muster (Austria) H Skoff	6	1	4
4	(Switzerland) C Mezzadri (Uruguay) D Pérez	6	6	6
(Spain) F Clavet (Ecuador) R Viver	2	7	1
(France) J Potier (France) T Tulasne	1	7	6
(Spain) J López-Maeso (Spain) A Tous	6	5	2

Quarterfinals
1	(Mexico) J Lozano (United States) T Witsken	7	6	4
(Peru) P Arraya (Argentina) H de la Peña	5	7	6
4	(Switzerland) C Mezzadri (Uruguay) D Pérez	2	6	9
(France) J Potier (France) T Tulasne	6	4	7

Semifinals
(Peru) P Arraya (Argentina) H de la Peña	3	3
4	(Switzerland) C Mezzadri (Uruguay) D Pérez	6	6

=== Bottom half ===
First round
6	(Spain) T Carbonell (Spain) J Sánchez	6	6
(Spain) J Aguilera (Spain) Joel Figueras	0	2
(Spain) J Avendaño (Socialist Federal Republic of Yugoslavia) B Orešar	6	7
(Spain) G López (Spain) Santiago Mora	2	5
(Spain) J Colás (Spain) D de Miguel	6	6
(Spain) S Bruguera (Spain) F Luna	0	0
8	(Sweden) R Båthman (Brazil) C Motta	6	6
(United States) L Duncan (Sweden) M Gustafsson	3	3
(Spain) C Costa (Spain) F Roig	4	6	4
(Argentina) E Bengoechea (Uruguay) M Filippini	6	2	6
(Spain) JC Báguena (Chile) P Rebolledo	6	6
(Spain) J Arrese (Sweden) C Bergström	2	3

Second round
6	(Spain) T Carbonell (Spain) J Sánchez	6	6
(Spain) J Avendaño (Socialist Federal Republic of Yugoslavia) B Orešar	3	2
(Spain) J Colás (Spain) D de Miguel	5	6	1
3	(Denmark) M Mortensen (Czechoslovakia) T Šmíd	7	4	6
8	(Sweden) R Båthman (Brazil) C Motta	6	6
(Argentina) E Bengoechea (Uruguay) M Filippini	2	3
(Spain) JC Báguena (Chile) P Rebolledo	4	1
2	(Spain) S Casal (Spain) E Sánchez	6	6

Quarterfinals
6	(Spain) T Carbonell (Spain) J Sánchez	6	6	6
3	(Denmark) M Mortensen (Czechoslovakia) T Šmíd	4	7	3
8	(Sweden) R Båthman (Brazil) C Motta	6	4
2	(Spain) S Casal (Spain) E Sánchez	7	6

Semifinals
6	(Spain) T Carbonell (Spain) J Sánchez	2	6
2	(Spain) S Casal (Spain) E Sánchez	6	7
