= 1988 Torneo Godó – Singles =

Singles
- 1988 Torneo Godó

Final
- Champion: (Sweden) Kent Carlsson
- Runner-up: (Austria) Thomas Muster
- Score: 6–3, 6–3, 3–6, 6–1

Details
- Draw: 56 (5WC/7Q)
- Seeds: 16

Events
Singles	Doubles
← 1987 ·	Barcelona Open	· 1989 →

Martín Jaite was the defending champion, but lost in the third round to Magnus Gustafsson.

Kent Carlsson won the title by defeating Thomas Muster 6–3, 6–3, 3–6, 6–1 in the final.

== Seeds ==
The first eight seeds received a bye to the second round.

1. (France) Henri Leconte (quarterfinals)
2. (Sweden) Kent Carlsson (champion)
3. (Argentina) Guillermo Pérez Roldán (quarterfinals)
4. (Spain) Emilio Sánchez (second round)
5. (Austria) Thomas Muster (final)
6. (Haiti) Ronald Agénor (second round)
7. (Argentina) Martín Jaite (third round)
8. (Spain) Jordi Arrese (quarterfinals)
9. (Sweden) Magnus Gustafsson (semifinals)
10. (Switzerland) Claudio Mezzadri (second round)
11. (United States) Lawson Duncan (first round)
12. (Argentina) Alberto Mancini (second round)
13. (Czechoslovakia) Tomáš Šmíd (third round)
14. (Uruguay) Marcelo Filippini (semifinals)
15. (Austria) Horst Skoff (third round)
16. (Spain) Fernando Luna (second round)

== Draw ==
=== Key ===
- Q = Qualifier
- WC = Wild card
- LL = Lucky loser
- Alt = Alternate
- ITF = ITF entry
- PR = Protected ranking
- SR = Special ranking
- SE = Special exempt
- JE = Junior exempt
- JR = Junior Accelerator Programme entrant
- CO = College Accelerator Programme entrant
- NG = Next Gen Accelerator Program entrant
- w/o = Walkover
- r = Retired
- d = Defaulted

=== Finals ===
Quarterfinals
1	(France) Henri Leconte	2	6
9	(Sweden) Magnus Gustafsson	6	7
3	(Argentina) Guillermo Pérez Roldán	6	4	3
5	(Austria) Thomas Muster	3	6	6
(Spain) Sergio Casal	5	6	3
14	(Uruguay) Marcelo Filippini	7	2	6
8	(Spain) Jordi Arrese	5	1
2	(Sweden) Kent Carlsson	7	6

Semifinals
9	(Sweden) Magnus Gustafsson	1	6	3
5	(Austria) Thomas Muster	6	3	6
14	(Uruguay) Marcelo Filippini	2	2
2	(Sweden) Kent Carlsson	6	6

Final
5	(Austria) Thomas Muster	3	3	6	1
2	(Sweden) Kent Carlsson	6	6	3	6

=== Top half ===
==== Section 1 ====
First round
WC	(Spain) G López	6	4	6
WC	(Spain) V López Morón	1	6	4
WC	(Venezuela) A Mora	4	2
(Argentina) C Miniussi	6	6
Q	(Spain) David Franco	3	6	5
15	(Austria) H Skoff	6	4	7
9	(Sweden) M Gustafsson	6	6
(Ecuador) R Viver	3	3
Q	(Sweden) T Haldin	4	2
(Sweden) R Båthman	6	6
(Spain) T Carbonell	6	6
(Chile) P Rebolledo	2	1

Second round
1	(France) H Leconte	6	6
WC	(Spain) G López	0	1
(Argentina) C Miniussi	4	6	0
15	(Austria) H Skoff	6	1	6
9	(Sweden) M Gustafsson	3	6	6
(Sweden) R Båthman	6	2	2
(Spain) T Carbonell	3	1
7	(Argentina) M Jaite	6	6

Third round
1	(France) H Leconte	6	6
15	(Austria) H Skoff	1	4
9	(Sweden) M Gustafsson	6	7
7	(Argentina) M Jaite	1	5

Quarterfinals
1	(France) H Leconte	2	6
9	(Sweden) M Gustafsson	6	7

==== Section 2 ====
First round
(Spain) J Sánchez	6	7
Q	(Spain) JC Báguena	3	6
(France) T Champion	6	6
Q	(Cuba) M Tabares	0	0
(Sweden) C Bergström	6	4	0
13	(Czechoslovakia) T Šmíd	3	6	6
11	(United States) L Duncan	6	2	4
(Argentina) E Bengoechea	3	6	6
(Spain) J Aguilera	7	6
(Brazil) C Motta	5	1
(Italy) M Narducci	3	4
(Sweden) U Stenlund	6	6

Second round
3	(Argentina) G Pérez Roldán	7	6
(Spain) J Sánchez	6	2
(France) T Champion	3	2
13	(Czechoslovakia) T Šmíd	6	6
(Argentina) E Bengoechea	6	6
(Spain) J Aguilera	1	2
(Sweden) U Stenlund	3	2
5	(Austria) T Muster	6	6

Third round
3	(Argentina) G Pérez Roldán	6	6
13	(Czechoslovakia) T Šmíd	2	2
(Argentina) E Bengoechea	3	7	4
5	(Austria) T Muster	6	5	6

Quarterfinals
3	(Argentina) G Pérez Roldán	6	4	3
5	(Austria) T Muster	3	6	6

=== Bottom half ===
==== Section 3 ====
First round
(Spain) S Casal	6	6
(Germany) D Keretić	4	2
(Uruguay) D Pérez	7	2	3
(France) J Potier	5	6	6
Q	(Argentina) G Giussani	3	0
12	(Argentina) A Mancini	6	6
14	(Uruguay) M Filippini	6	6
WC	(Spain) F Roig	2	1
(Spain) A Tous	2	2
(Spain) J Colás	6	6
WC	(Spain) C Costa	7	3	3
(Argentina) F Davín	5	6	6

Second round
6	(Haiti) R Agénor	6	5	2
(Spain) S Casal	2	7	6
(France) J Potier	7	4	6
12	(Argentina) A Mancini	6	6	2
14	(Uruguay) M Filippini	6	6	6
(Spain) J Colás	7	2	2
(Argentina) F Davín	2	6	6
4	(Spain) E Sánchez	6	4	2

Third round
(Spain) S Casal	6	6
(France) J Potier	2	1
14	(Uruguay) M Filippini	2	6	6
(Argentina) F Davín	6	4	2

Quarterfinals
(Spain) S Casal	5	6	3
14	(Uruguay) M Filippini	7	2	6

==== Section 4 ====
First round
(Italy) P Canè	6	6
(Peru) P Arraya	1	3
(Spain) J Avendaño	2	6	3
(Socialist Federal Republic of Yugoslavia) B Orešar	6	4	6
(France) T Tulasne	6	1	4
10	(Switzerland) C Mezzadri	4	6	6
16	(Spain) F Luna	6	6
(Italy) F Cancellotti	0	3
Q	(Spain) S Bruguera	4	3
(Argentina) H de la Peña	6	6
Q	(Spain) F Clavet	2	2
(Spain) E Osta	6	6

Second round
8	(Spain) J Arrese	6	6
(Italy) P Canè	2	4
(Socialist Federal Republic of Yugoslavia) B Orešar	7	6
10	(Switzerland) C Mezzadri	6	3
16	(Spain) F Luna	1	3
(Argentina) H de la Peña	6	6
(Spain) E Osta	4	0
2	(Sweden) K Carlsson	6	6

Third round
8	(Spain) J Arrese	6	6
(Socialist Federal Republic of Yugoslavia) B Orešar	3	2
(Argentina) H de la Peña	6	1
2	(Sweden) K Carlsson	7	6

Quarterfinals
8	(Spain) J Arrese	5	1
2	(Sweden) K Carlsson	7	6
