= 1987 Torneo Godó – Singles =

Singles
- 1987 Torneo Godó

Final
- Champion: (Argentina) Martín Jaite
- Runner-up: (Sweden) Mats Wilander
- Score: 7–6^{(7–5)}, 6–4, 4–6, 0–6, 6–4

Details
- Draw: 56 (5WC/7Q)
- Seeds: 16

Events
Singles	Doubles
← 1986 ·	Barcelona Open	· 1988 →

Kent Carlsson was the defending champion but was forced to forfeit the rest of the season, due to a knee injury that was suffered in August.

Martín Jaite won the title by defeating Mats Wilander 7–6^{(7–5)}, 6–4, 4–6, 0–6, 6–4 in the final.

== Seeds ==
1. (Sweden) Mats Wilander (final)
2. (Czechoslovakia) Miloslav Mečíř (quarterfinals)
3. (Ecuador) Andrés Gómez (quarterfinals)
4. (Spain) Emilio Sánchez (quarterfinals)
5. (Argentina) Martín Jaite (champion)
6. (Argentina) Guillermo Pérez Roldán (semifinals)
7. (Sweden) Jan Gunnarsson (second round)
8. (Argentina) Eduardo Bengoechea (semifinals)
9. (Czechoslovakia) Marián Vajda (third round)
10. (Czechoslovakia) Tomáš Šmíd (second round)
11. (United States) Jimmy Arias (first round)
12. (Sweden) Ulf Stenlund (second round)
13. (France) Tarik Benhabiles (first round)
14. (Austria) Horst Skoff (first round)
15. (Austria) Thomas Muster (second round)
16. (Haiti) Ronald Agénor (third round)

Click on the seed number of a player to go to their draw section.

== Draw ==
=== Key ===
- Q = Qualifier
- WC = Wild card
- LL = Lucky loser
- Alt = Alternate
- ITF = ITF entry
- PR = Protected ranking
- SR = Special ranking
- SE = Special exempt
- JE = Junior exempt
- JR = Junior Accelerator Programme entrant
- CO = College Accelerator Programme entrant
- NG = Next Gen Accelerator Program entrant
- w/o = Walkover
- r = Retired
- d = Defaulted

=== Finals ===
Quarterfinals
1	(Sweden) Mats Wilander	6	6
WC	(Spain) Tomás Carbonell	0	3
3	(Ecuador) Andrés Gómez	3	0^{r}
6	(Argentina) Guillermo Pérez Roldán	6	1
5	(Argentina) Martín Jaite	6	7
4	(Spain) Emilio Sánchez	3	6
8	(Argentina) Eduardo Bengoechea	6	6
2	(Czechoslovakia) Miloslav Mečíř	4	1

Semifinals
1	(Sweden) Mats Wilander	6	6
6	(Argentina) Guillermo Pérez Roldán	3	0
5	(Argentina) Martín Jaite	6	6
8	(Argentina) Eduardo Bengoechea	2	4

Final
1	(Sweden) Mats Wilander	6^{5}	4	6	6	4
5	(Argentina) Martín Jaite	7^{7}	6	4	0	6

=== Top half ===
==== Section 1 ====
First Round
(Australia) C Limberger	4	5
(Sweden) J Windahl	6	7
Q	(Spain) J Aguilera	4	6	6
Q	(Argentina) A Mancini	6	2	1
WC	(Spain) J Bardou	2	7	0
15	(Austria) T Muster	6	6	6
10	(Czechoslovakia) T Smid	7	6
(West Germany) A Maurer	6	3
(Switzerland) C Mezzadri	6	6
(Belgium) L Pimek	3	1
WC	(Spain) T Carbonell	0	6	6
(Sweden) C Bergström	6	2	2

Second Round
1	(Sweden) M Wilander	6	7
(Sweden) J Windahl	3	6
Q	(Spain) J Aguilera	6	6
15	(Austria) T Muster	4	3
10	(Czechoslovakia) T Smid	1	3
(Switzerland) C Mezzadri	6	6
WC	(Spain) T Carbonell	6	6
7	(Sweden) J Gunnarsson	3	3

Third Round
1	(Sweden) M Wilander	6	7
Q	(Spain) J Aguilera	4	5
(Switzerland) C Mezzadri	4	6	7
WC	(Spain) T Carbonell	6	1	9

Quarterfinals
1	(Sweden) M Wilander	6	6
WC	(Spain) T Carbonell	0	3

==== Section 2 ====
First Round
(West Germany) T Meinecke	1	5
(Peru) P Arraya	6	7
(Spain) S Casal	7	6
(Spain) A Tous	6	0
(Czechoslovakia) K Nováček	6	7
14	(Austria) H Skoff	1	6
11	(United States) J Arias	5	3
Q	(Argentina) C Miniussi	7	6
(West Germany) P Vojtíšek	4	6	2
(Argentina) G Vilas	6	2	6
(Socialist Federal Republic of Yugoslavia) B Orešar	3	4
(Czechoslovakia) M Šrejber	6	6

Second Round
3	(Ecuador) A Gómez	4	6	6
(Peru) P Arraya	6	1	1
(Spain) S Casal	6	5	6
(Czechoslovakia) K Nováček	2	7	4
Q	(Argentina) C Miniussi	4	4
(Argentina) G Vilas	6	6
(Czechoslovakia) M Šrejber	4	6	6
6	(Argentina) G Pérez Roldán	6	1	8

Third Round
3	(Ecuador) A Gómez	6	6
(Spain) S Casal	2	2
(Argentina) G Vilas	4	6
6	(Argentina) G Pérez Roldán	6	7

Quarterfinals
3	(Ecuador) A Gómez	3	0^{r}
6	(Argentina) G Pérez Roldán	6	1

=== Bottom half ===
==== Section 3 ====
First Round
(Spain) D de Miguel	4	1
(Brazil) C Motta	6	6
(West Germany) R Osterthun	6	3	6
Q	(Chile) P Rebolledo	2	6	2
WC	(Spain) F Roig	2	3
12	(Sweden) U Stenlund	6	6
13	(France) T Benhabiles	5	0
(Brazil) L Mattar	7	6
(West Germany) D Keretić	5	3
(Argentina) H de la Peña	7	6
(Sweden) H Sundström	1	3
(Argentina) F Davín	6	6

Second Round
5	(Argentina) M Jaite	7	4	6
(Brazil) C Motta	6	6	1
(West Germany) R Osterthun	6	6
12	(Sweden) U Stenlund	4	4
(Brazil) L Mattar	6	6
(Argentina) H de la Peña	3	4
(Argentina) F Davín	5	2
4	(Spain) E Sánchez	7	6

Third Round
5	(Argentina) M Jaite	6	6
(West Germany) R Osterthun	3	3
(Brazil) L Mattar	1	6
4	(Spain) E Sánchez	6	7

Quarterfinals
5	(Argentina) M Jaite	6	7
4	(Spain) E Sánchez	3	6

==== Section 4 ====
First Round
(France) T Tulasne	3	6
(Spain) J Sánchez	6	7
(Argentina) F Yunis	6	7
(Italy) C Pistolesi	2	6
(West Germany) P Kühnen	4	6	3
9	(Czechoslovakia) M Vajda	6	3	6
16	(Haiti) R Agénor	2	7	6
Q	(United States) L Duncan	6	5	2
WC	(Spain) S Mora	3	3
Q	(Mexico) F MacIel	6	6
Q	(Spain) J Arrese	6	6
WC	(Spain) J Avendaño	2	3

Second Round
8	(Argentina) E Bengoechea	2	7	10
(Spain) J Sánchez	6	6	8
(Argentina) F Yunis	3	6	4
9	(Czechoslovakia) M Vajda	6	3	6
16	(Haiti) R Agénor	7	2	6
Q	(Mexico) F MacIel	6	6	1
Q	(Spain) J Arrese	6	4	3
2	(Czechoslovakia) M Mečíř	4	6	6

Third Round
8	(Argentina) E Bengoechea	7	6
9	(Czechoslovakia) M Vajda	5	3
16	(Haiti) R Agénor	4	6	2
2	(Czechoslovakia) M Mečíř	6	3	6

Quarterfinals
8	(Argentina) E Bengoechea	6	6
2	(Czechoslovakia) M Mečíř	4	1
