= 1987 Torneo Godó – Doubles =

Doubles
- 1987 Torneo Godó

Final
- Champions: (Czechoslovakia) Miloslav Mečíř (Czechoslovakia) Tomáš Šmíd
- Runners-up: (Argentina) Javier Frana (Argentina) Christian Miniussi
- Score: 6–1, 6–2

Details
- Draw: 28 (3WC)
- Seeds: 8

Events
Singles	Doubles
← 1986 ·	Barcelona Open	· 1988 →

Jan Gunnarsson and Joakim Nyström were the defending champions, but Nyström did not compete in this year. Gunnarsson teamed up with Mats Wilander and lost in the quarterfinals to Brett Dickinson and Roberto Saad.

Javier Frana and Christian Miniussi won the title by defeating Javier Frana and Christian Miniussi 6–1, 6–2 in the final.

== Seeds ==
The first four seeds received a bye to the second round.

1. (Spain) Sergio Casal / (Spain) Emilio Sánchez (semifinals)
2. (Czechoslovakia) Miloslav Mečíř / (Czechoslovakia) Tomáš Šmíd (champions)
3. (Chile) Hans Gildemeister / (Ecuador) Andrés Gómez (second round)
4. (Sweden) Jan Gunnarsson / (Sweden) Mats Wilander (quarterfinals)
5. (Australia) Carl Limberger / (Australia) Mark Woodforde (second round)
6. (Spain) José López-Maeso / (Spain) Alberto Tous (first round)
7. (West Germany) Tore Meinecke / (West Germany) Ricki Osterthun (first round)
8. (Brazil) Ricardo Acioly / (Peru) Carlos di Laura (quarterfinals)

== Draw ==
=== Key ===
- Q = Qualifier
- WC = Wild card
- LL = Lucky loser
- Alt = Alternate
- ITF = ITF entry
- PR = Protected ranking
- SR = Special ranking
- SE = Special exempt
- JE = Junior exempt
- JR = Junior Accelerator Programme entrant
- CO = College Accelerator Programme entrant
- NG = Next Gen Accelerator Program entrant
- w/o = Walkover
- r = Retired
- d = Defaulted

=== Finals ===
Semifinals
1	(Spain) Sergio Casal (Spain) Emilio Sánchez	4	6	2
(Argentina) Javier Frana (Argentina) Christian Miniussi	6	4	6
(United States) Brett Dickinson (Argentina) Roberto Saad	4	5
2	(Czechoslovakia) Miloslav Mečíř (Czechoslovakia) Tomáš Šmíd	6	7

Final
(Argentina) Javier Frana (Argentina) Christian Miniussi	1	2
2	(Czechoslovakia) Miloslav Mečíř (Czechoslovakia) Tomáš Šmíd	6	6

=== Top half ===
First round
(Spain) J Colás (Spain) D de Miguel	6	2
(Czechoslovakia) M Šrejber (Czechoslovakia) C Suk	7	6
(Sweden) T Svantesson (United States) J Treml	6	6	6
(West Germany) J Becka (West Germany) P Vojtíšek	4	7	3
(United States) M Dickson (United States) D Tarr	6	6
7	(West Germany) T Meinecke (West Germany) R Osterthun	2	1
(Sweden) LA Wahlgren (Sweden) J Windahl	6	6
WC	(Spain) Florentino Anda (Spain) G Urpí	2	0
(United States) J Arias (Australia) D Graham	6	3	0
(Argentina) J Frana (Argentina) C Miniussi	3	6	6
(Argentina) M Jaite (Spain) J Sánchez	6	3	0
5	(Australia) C Limberger (Australia) M Woodforde	3	6	6

Second round
1	(Spain) S Casal (Spain) E Sánchez	7	6
(Czechoslovakia) M Šrejber (Czechoslovakia) C Suk	5	3
(Sweden) T Svantesson (United States) J Treml	7	4	4
(United States) M Dickson (United States) D Tarr	5	6	6
3	(Chile) H Gildemeister (Ecuador) A Gómez	2	6	4
(Sweden) LA Wahlgren (Sweden) J Windahl	6	4	6
(Argentina) J Frana (Argentina) C Miniussi	6	7
5	(Australia) C Limberger (Australia) M Woodforde	1	5

Quarterfinals
1	(Spain) S Casal (Spain) E Sánchez	6	6
(United States) M Dickson (United States) D Tarr	3	0
(Sweden) LA Wahlgren (Sweden) J Windahl	6	4
(Argentina) J Frana (Argentina) C Miniussi	7	6

Semifinals
1	(Spain) S Casal (Spain) E Sánchez	4	6	2
(Argentina) J Frana (Argentina) C Miniussi	6	4	6

=== Bottom half ===
First round
6	(Spain) J López-Maeso (Spain) A Tous	4	2
(United States) B Dickinson (Argentina) R Saad	6	6
(Mexico) L Lavalle (Mexico) A Moreno	2	5
(Haiti) R Agénor (France) T Benhabiles	6	7
(South Africa) C Campbell (New Zealand) S Guy	5	6	7
(Spain) J Arrese (Spain) J Bardou	7	3	5
8	(Brazil) R Acioly (Peru) C di Laura	6	6
WC	(Peru) P Arraya (Spain) T Carbonell	4	3
(Australia) R Barlow (West Germany) H Rittersbacher	2	3
(United States) J Brown (United States) L Duncan	6	6
(Brazil) G Barbosa (Brazil) M Menezes	6	3	6
WC	(Spain) J Avendaño (Spain) F Roig	1	6	3

Second round
(United States) B Dickinson (Argentina) R Saad	6	3	6
(Haiti) R Agénor (France) T Benhabiles	2	6	4
(South Africa) C Campbell (New Zealand) S Guy	4	6
4	(Sweden) J Gunnarsson (Sweden) M Wilander	6	7
8	(Brazil) R Acioly (Peru) C di Laura	6	7
(United States) J Brown (United States) L Duncan	3	6
(Brazil) G Barbosa (Brazil) M Menezes	2	2
2	(Czechoslovakia) M Mečíř (Czechoslovakia) T Šmíd	6	6

Quarterfinals
(United States) B Dickinson (Argentina) R Saad	4	6	6
4	(Sweden) J Gunnarsson (Sweden) M Wilander	6	3	4
8	(Brazil) R Acioly (Peru) C di Laura	7	1	2
2	(Czechoslovakia) M Mečíř (Czechoslovakia) T Šmíd	6	6	6

Semifinals
(United States) B Dickinson (Argentina) R Saad	4	5
2	(Czechoslovakia) M Mečíř (Czechoslovakia) T Šmíd	6	7
