= 1986 Madrid Open – Doubles =

Doubles
- 1986 Madrid Open

Final
- Champions: (Sweden) Anders Järryd (Sweden) Joakim Nyström
- Runners-up: (Spain) Jesús Colás (Spain) David de Miguel
- Score: 6–2, 6–2

Events
Singles	Doubles
- Madrid Tennis Grand Prix

Givaldo Barbosa and Ivan Kley were the defending champions, but none competed this year.

Anders Järryd and Joakim Nyström won the title by defeating Jesús Colás and David de Miguel 6–2, 6–2 in the final.

== Seeds ==
1. (Sweden) Anders Järryd / (Sweden) Joakim Nyström (champions)
2. (Brazil) Nelson Aerts / (Brazil) Luiz Mattar (semifinals)
3. (Spain) Jordi Arrese / (Spain) Jorge Bardou (quarterfinals)
4. (Spain) Jesús Colás / (Spain) David de Miguel (final)

== Draw ==
Key

- Q = Qualifier
- WC = Wild card
- LL = Lucky loser
- Alt = Alternate
- ITF = ITF entry
- PR = Protected ranking
- SR = Special ranking
- SE = Special exempt
- JE = Junior exempt
- JR = Junior Accelerator Programme entrant
- CO = College Accelerator Programme entrant
- NG = Next Gen Accelerator Program entrant
- w/o = Walkover
- r = Retired
- d = Defaulted

=== Draw ===
First round
1	(Sweden) A Järryd (Sweden) J Nyström	6	7
(Spain) J Clavet (Spain) A Tous	4	5
(Argentina) M Ingaramo (Argentina) R Saad	6	3	4
(Egypt) A El-Mehelmy (West Germany) A Stepanek	4	6	6
3	(Spain) J Arrese (Spain) J Bardou	6	6	6
(Spain) A Alvarez-Alvarez (Spain) F García Lleó	2	7	4
(Peru) C di Laura (Spain) J Sánchez	7	6
(Spain) J-C Andrade (Spain) J Lopez-Maeso	5	2
(Spain) J Avendaño (Chile) P Rebolledo	3	6	6
(Spain) R Sanchez-Rueda (Ecuador) R Viver	6	4	1
(West Germany) T Meinecke (West Germany) R Osterthun	2	5
4	(Spain) J Colás (Spain) D de Miguel	6	7
(Sweden) K Carlsson (United States) L Duncan	6	2	4
(Spain) F Anda-Gomez (Paraguay) V Pecci	3	6	6
(Haiti) R Agénor (United States) B Scanlon	5	2
2	(Brazil) N Aerts (Brazil) L Mattar	7	6

Quarterfinals
1	(Sweden) A Järryd (Sweden) J Nyström	w/o
(Egypt) A El-Mehelmy (West Germany) A Stepanek
3	(Spain) J Arrese (Spain) J Bardou	3	3
(Peru) C di Laura (Spain) J Sánchez	6	6
(Spain) J Avendaño (Chile) P Rebolledo	3	4
4	(Spain) J Colás (Spain) D de Miguel	6	6
(Spain) F Anda-Gomez (Paraguay) V Pecci	6	3
2	(Brazil) N Aerts (Brazil) L Mattar	7	6

Semifinals
1	(Sweden) A Järryd (Sweden) J Nyström	6	6
(Peru) C di Laura (Spain) J Sánchez	4	2
4	(Spain) J Colás (Spain) D de Miguel	6	6	6
2	(Brazil) N Aerts (Brazil) L Mattar	2	7	0

Final
1	(Sweden) A Järryd (Sweden) J Nyström	6	6
4	(Spain) J Colás (Spain) D de Miguel	2	2
