= Jareño =

Jareño is a Spanish surname. Notable people with the surname include:

- Francisco Jareño y Alarcón (1818–1892), Spanish architect
- Samuel López Jareño (born 1970), Spanish tennis coach
