= 1987 U.S. Clay Court Championships – Doubles =

Doubles
- 1987 U.S. Clay Court Championships

Final
- Champions: (Australia) Laurie Warder (United States) Blaine Willenborg
- Runners-up: (Sweden) Joakim Nyström (Sweden) Mats Wilander
- Score: 6–0, 6–3

Details
- Draw: 28
- Seeds: 8

Events
Singles	Doubles
- U.S. Clay Court Championships

Hans Gildemeister and Andrés Gómez were the defending champions but lost in the second round to Craig Campbell and Barry Moir. Third-seeded pair Laurie Warder and Blaine Willenborg claimed the title by defeating Joakim Nyström and Mats Wilander in the final.

== Seeds ==
The top four seeds received a bye into the second round. A champion seed is indicated in bold text while text in italics indicates the round in which that seed was eliminated.

1. (Chile) Hans Gildemeister / (Ecuador) Andrés Gómez (second round)
2. (Sweden) Joakim Nyström / (Sweden) Mats Wilander (final)
3. (Australia) **Laurie Warder / (United States) Blaine Willenborg (champions)**
4. (West Germany) Tore Meinecke / (Netherlands) Tom Nijssen (second round)
5. (Chile) Ricardo Acuña / (South Africa) Gary Muller (second round)
6. (United States) John Letts / (South Africa) Michael Robertson (second round)
7. (United States) Rill Baxter / (United States) Joey Rive (semifinals)
8. (United States) Dan Cassidy / (United States) Mel Purcell (quarterfinals)

== Draw ==
Key

- Q = Qualifier
- WC = Wild card
- LL = Lucky loser
- Alt = Alternate
- ITF = ITF entry
- PR = Protected ranking
- SR = Special ranking
- SE = Special exempt
- JE = Junior exempt
- JR = Junior Accelerator Programme entrant
- CO = College Accelerator Programme entrant
- NG = Next Gen Accelerator Program entrant
- w/o = Walkover
- r = Retired
- d = Defaulted

=== Finals ===
Semifinals
7	(United States) Rill Baxter (United States) Joey Rive	1	1
3	**(Australia) Laurie Warder** **(United States) Blaine Willenborg**	**6**	**6**
(Uruguay) Diego Pérez (United States) Todd Witsken	**6**	3	2
2	**(Sweden) Joakim Nyström** **(Sweden) Mats Wilander**	3	**6**	**6**

Final
3	**(Australia) Laurie Warder** **(United States) Blaine Willenborg**	**6**	**6**
2	(Sweden) Joakim Nyström (Sweden) Mats Wilander	0	3

=== Top half ===
First round
(South Africa) C Campbell (South Africa) B Moir	2	5
**(United States) J Ross** **(United States) D Tarr**	**6**	**7**
(France) T Benhabiles (Czechoslovakia) L Pimek	2	2
WC	**(South Africa) A Burrow** **(United States) R Reneberg**	**6**	**6**
(United States) A Agassi (United States) B Dickinson	3	4
7	**(United States) R Baxter** **(United States) J Rive**	**6**	**6**
WC	**(United States) J Berger** **(Argentina) R Saad**	4	**6**	**6**
(United States) R Rudeen (United States) T Warneke	**6**	3	4
**(United States) J Arias** **(United States) T Siegel**	**7**	**6**
(West Germany) P Kühnen (Nigeria) T Mmoh	6	1
(United States) G Hill (Australia) Marcus Smith	**7**	4	4
5	**(Chile) R Acuña** **(South Africa) G Muller**	6	**6**	**6**

Second round
1	(Chile) H Gildemeister (Ecuador) A Gómez	6	2
**(United States) J Ross** **(United States) D Tarr**	**7**	**6**
WC	(South Africa) A Burrow (United States) R Reneberg	3	2
7	**(United States) R Baxter** **(United States) J Rive**	**6**	**6**
3	**(Australia) L Warder** **(United States) B Willenborg**	3	**7**	**6**
WC	(United States) J Berger (Argentina) R Saad	**6**	6	3
**(United States) J Arias** **(United States) T Siegel**	6	**6**	**6**
5	(Chile) R Acuña (South Africa) G Muller	**7**	3	4

Quarterfinals
(United States) J Ross (United States) D Tarr	4	3
7	**(United States) R Baxter** **(United States) J Rive**	**6**	**6**
3	**(Australia) L Warder** **(United States) B Willenborg**	**6**	**7**
(United States) J Arias (United States) T Siegel	3	5

Semifinals
7	(United States) R Baxter (United States) J Rive	1	1
3	**(Australia) L Warder** **(United States) B Willenborg**	**6**	**6**

=== Bottom half ===
First round
6	(United States) J Letts (South Africa) M Robertson	6	4
**(Uruguay) D Pérez** **(United States) T Witsken**	**7**	**6**
**(Argentina) J Frana** **(Argentina) C Miniussi**	**7**	3	**10**
(United States) B Cox (Australia) M Fancutt	6	**6**	8
(United States) M Davis (United States) L Shiras	4	1^{r}
**(Australia) D Macpherson** **(Australia) S Youl**	**6**	4
8	**(United States) D Cassidy** **(United States) M Purcell**	**7**	**7**
(United States) J Brown (United States) D MacBride	6	6
(Colombia) Á Jordan (United States) CD Miller	6	3
WC	**(United States) L Jensen** **(United States) P McEnroe**	**7**	**6**
**(Paraguay) F González** **(Paraguay) V Pecci**	**6**	**6**
(United States) J Levine (Australia) CA Miller	1	2

Second round
**(Uruguay) D Pérez** **(United States) T Witsken**	**6**	**6**
(Argentina) J Frana (Argentina) C Miniussi	3	4
**(Australia) D Macpherson** **(Australia) S Youl**	**6**	**6**
4	(West Germany) T Meinecke (Netherlands) T Nijssen	3	1
8	**(United States) D Cassidy** **(United States) M Purcell**	**7**	**6**
WC	(United States) L Jensen (United States) P McEnroe	5	0
(Paraguay) F González (Paraguay) V Pecci	6	2
2	**(Sweden) J Nyström** **(Sweden) M Wilander**	**7**	**6**

Quarterfinals
**(Uruguay) D Pérez** **(United States) T Witsken**	**7**	**6**
(Australia) D Macpherson (Australia) S Youl	5	4
8	(United States) D Cassidy (United States) M Purcell	4	**6**	2
2	**(Sweden) J Nyström** **(Sweden) M Wilander**	**6**	3	**6**

Semifinals
(Uruguay) D Pérez (United States) T Witsken	**6**	3	2
2	**(Sweden) J Nyström** **(Sweden) M Wilander**	3	**6**	**6**
