= 1986 Madrid Open – Singles =

Singles
- 1986 Madrid Open

Final
- Champion: (Sweden) Joakim Nyström
- Runner-up: (Sweden) Kent Carlsson
- Score: 6–1, 6–1

Details
- Draw: 32
- Seeds: 8

Events
Singles	Doubles
- Madrid Tennis Grand Prix

Andreas Maurer was the defending champion, but lost in the semifinals to Joakim Nyström.

Nyström won the title by defeating Kent Carlsson 6–1, 6–1 in the final.

== Seeds ==
1. (Sweden) Joakim Nyström (champion)
2. (Sweden) Anders Järryd (semifinals)
3. (West Germany) Andreas Maurer (semifinals)
4. (Sweden) Kent Carlsson (final)
5. (United States) Lawson Duncan (second round)
6. (Haiti) Ronald Agénor (second round)
7. (Argentina) Marcelo Ingaramo (quarterfinals)
8. (Czechoslovakia) Karel Nováček (first round)

== Draw ==
Key

- Q = Qualifier
- WC = Wild card
- LL = Lucky loser
- Alt = Alternate
- ITF = ITF entry
- PR = Protected ranking
- SR = Special ranking
- SE = Special exempt
- JE = Junior exempt
- JR = Junior Accelerator Programme entrant
- CO = College Accelerator Programme entrant
- NG = Next Gen Accelerator Program entrant
- w/o = Walkover
- r = Retired
- d = Defaulted

=== Finals ===
Semifinals
1	(Sweden) Joakim Nyström	6	6
3	(West Germany) Andreas Maurer	4	4
4	(Sweden) Kent Carlsson	5	7	6
2	(Sweden) Anders Järryd	7	5	3

Final
1	(Sweden) Joakim Nyström	6	6
4	(Sweden) Kent Carlsson	1	1

=== Top half ===
First round
1	(Sweden) J Nyström	6	6
(Spain) J Aguilera	2	1
WC	(Spain) J Clavet	3	6	2
(Spain) F Luna	6	3	6
(Germany) W Popp	6	6
(Egypt) A El-Mehelmy	1	3
(Paraguay) V Pecci	6	7
8	(Czechoslovakia) K Nováček	4	5
3	(West Germany) A Maurer	6	5	6
(Ecuador) R Viver	1	7	2
(Spain) J Avendaño	4	2
(Germany) A Stepanek	6	6
(Brazil) L Mattar	3	7	7
(United States) B Scanlon	6	6	6
(Argentina) R Saad	2	1
5	(United States) L Duncan	6	6

Second round
1	(Sweden) J Nyström	6	7
(Spain) F Luna	0	6
(Germany) W Popp	3	7	0
(Paraguay) V Pecci	6	5	6
3	(West Germany) A Maurer	6	6
(Germany) A Stepanek	1	2
(Brazil) L Mattar	6	6
5	(United States) L Duncan	4	2

Quarterfinals
1	(Sweden) J Nyström	6	7
(Paraguay) V Pecci	2	5
3	(West Germany) A Maurer	6	7
(Brazil) L Mattar	2	6

Semifinals
1	(Sweden) J Nyström	6	6
3	(West Germany) A Maurer	4	4

=== Bottom half ===
First round
6	(Haiti) R Agénor	6	4	6
WC	(Spain) E Vázquez	0	6	1
WC	(Spain) JC Andrade	2	1
(Germany) T Meinecke	6	6
Q	(Spain) T Carbonell	7	3	6
(Peru) C di Laura	5	6	7
(Spain) J Lopez-Maeso	3	3
4	(Sweden) K Carlsson	6	6
7	(Argentina) M Ingaramo	7	4	6
Q	(Chile) P Rebolledo	5	6	4
(Spain) D de Miguel	6	7	5
(Brazil) N Aerts	7	5	7
Q	(Spain) J Colás	4	3
(Germany) R Osterthun	6	6
Q	(Spain) J Bardou	1	2
2	(Sweden) A Järryd	6	6

Second round
6	(Haiti) R Agénor	4	7	6
(Germany) T Meinecke	6	5	7
(Peru) C di Laura	1	4
4	(Sweden) K Carlsson	6	6
7	(Argentina) M Ingaramo	6	6
(Brazil) N Aerts	4	4
(Germany) R Osterthun	3	4
2	(Sweden) A Järryd	6	6

Quarterfinals
(Germany) T Meinecke	2	2
4	(Sweden) K Carlsson	6	6
7	(Argentina) M Ingaramo	5	5
2	(Sweden) A Järryd	7	7

Semifinals
4	(Sweden) K Carlsson	5	7	6
2	(Sweden) A Järryd	7	5	3
