= 1987 U.S. Clay Court Championships – Singles =

Singles
- 1987 U.S. Clay Court Championships

Final
- Champion: (Sweden) Mats Wilander
- Runner-up: (Sweden) Kent Carlsson
- Score: 7–5, 6–3

Details
- Draw: 56
- Seeds: 16

Events
Singles	Doubles
- U.S. Clay Court Championships

Andrés Gómez was the defending champion but he lost in the second round to Gary Muller. Top-seeded Mats Wilander claimed the title by defeating Kent Carlsson in the final, as he had in Boston a week earlier.

== Seeds ==
The top eight seeds received a bye into the second round. A champion seed is indicated in bold text while text in italics indicates the round in which that seed was eliminated.

1. (Sweden) **Mats Wilander (champion)**
2. (Ecuador) Andrés Gómez (second round)
3. (Sweden) Kent Carlsson (final)
4. (Argentina) Martín Jaite (quarterfinals)
5. (Sweden) Joakim Nyström (semifinals)
6. (France) Tarik Benhabiles (second round)
7. (France) Thierry Tulasne (second round)
8. (United States) Jimmy Arias (second round)
9. (United States) Jay Berger (second round)
10. (Argentina) Guillermo Pérez Roldán (semifinals)
11. (Argentina) Horacio de la Peña (first round)
12. (Argentina) Guillermo Vilas (third round)
13. (United States) Mel Purcell (second round)
14. (United States) Andre Agassi (third round)
15. (United States) Todd Witsken (second round)
16. (Uruguay) Diego Pérez (third round)

== Draw ==
Key

- Q = Qualifier
- WC = Wild card
- LL = Lucky loser
- Alt = Alternate
- ITF = ITF entry
- PR = Protected ranking
- SR = Special ranking
- SE = Special exempt
- JE = Junior exempt
- JR = Junior Accelerator Programme entrant
- CO = College Accelerator Programme entrant
- NG = Next Gen Accelerator Program entrant
- w/o = Walkover
- r = Retired
- d = Defaulted

=== Finals ===
Quarterfinals
1	**(Sweden) Mats Wilander**	**6**	**6**
WC	(United States) Richey Reneberg	4	4
4	(Argentina) Martín Jaite	6	0
5	**(Sweden) Joakim Nyström**	**7**	**6**
(West Germany) Patrik Kühnen	6	1
3	**(Sweden) Kent Carlsson**	**7**	**6**
10	**(Argentina) G Pérez Roldán**	1	**6**	**6**
(South Africa) Gary Muller	**6**	3	4

Semifinals
1	**(Sweden) Mats Wilander**	**6**	**7**
5	(Sweden) Joakim Nyström	4	5
3	**(Sweden) Kent Carlsson**	**6**	**6**
10	(Argentina) G Pérez Roldán	2	2

Final
1	**(Sweden) Mats Wilander**	**7**	**6**
3	(Sweden) Kent Carlsson	5	3

=== Top half ===
==== Section 1 ====
First round
**(United States) L Shiras**	**6**	**6**
(United States) M Buckley	1	4
(Italy) F Cancellotti	4	3
**(Spain) F Luna**	**6**	**6**
Q	(Chile) R Acuña	4	**7**	1
16	**(Uruguay) D Pérez**	**6**	5	**6**
9	**(United States) J Berger**	**6**	5	**7**
(Italy) C Panatta	2	**7**	5
**(United States) B Willenborg**	**6**	**6**
(Canada) M Wostenholme	1	0
(Peru) P Arraya	2	3
WC	**(United States) R Reneberg**	**6**	**6**

Second round
1	**(Sweden) M Wilander**	**6**	**7**
(United States) L Shiras	1	5
(Spain) F Luna	0	3
16	**(Uruguay) D Pérez**	**6**	**6**
9	(United States) J Berger	**7**	5	4
**(United States) B Willenborg**	6	**7**	**6**
WC	**(United States) R Reneberg**	6	**6**	**11**
8	(United States) J Arias	**7**	4	9

Third round
1	**(Sweden) M Wilander**	**7**	**7**
16	(Uruguay) D Pérez	5	5
(United States) B Willenborg	6	0
WC	**(United States) R Reneberg**	**7**	**6**

Quarterfinals
1	**(Sweden) M Wilander**	**6**	**6**
WC	(United States) R Reneberg	4	4

==== Section 2 ====
First round
WC	(Chile) H Gildemeister	3	3
Q	**(Paraguay) H Chapacú**	**6**	**6**
WC	(United States) P McEnroe	4	4
**(Netherlands) T Nijssen**	**6**	**6**
Q	(Sweden) T Svantesson	3	5
14	**(United States) A Agassi**	**6**	**7**
12	**(Argentina) G Vilas**	**6**	**6**
Q	(United States) B Page	2	2
WC	(United States) A Parker	3	**6**	4
**(United States) D Tarr**	**6**	3	**6**
**(Nigeria) T Mmoh**	**6**	**6**
(Spain) J Avendaño	3	0

Second round
4	**(Argentina) M Jaite**	**6**	**6**
Q	(Paraguay) H Chapacú	3	2
(Netherlands) T Nijssen	2	4
14	**(United States) A Agassi**	**6**	**6**
12	**(Argentina) G Vilas**	**7**	**6**
(United States) D Tarr	5	1
(Nigeria) T Mmoh	0	2
5	**(Sweden) J Nyström**	**6**	**6**

Third round
4	**(Argentina) M Jaite**	4	**6**	**6**
14	(United States) A Agassi	**6**	4	2
12	(Argentina) G Vilas	1	**6**	4
5	**(Sweden) J Nyström**	**6**	4	**6**

Quarterfinals
4	(Argentina) M Jaite	6	0
5	**(Sweden) J Nyström**	**7**	**6**

=== Bottom half ===
==== Section 3 ====
First round
**(United States) J Brown**	**6**	**6**
(Mexico) F Maciel	4	1
**(South Africa) B Moir**	**6**	**6**
(United Kingdom) A Castle	1	3
**(West Germany) P Kühnen**	4	**7**	**6**
11	(Argentina) H de la Peña	**6**	5	3
13	**(United States) M Purcell**	**6**	**6**
Q	(Colombia) Á Jordan	3	3
(Paraguay) V Pecci	3	2
Q	**(Argentina) J Frana**	**6**	**6**
WC	(United States) L Jensen	1	0
Q	**(United States) D Cassidy**	**6**	**6**

Second round
6	(France) T Benhabiles	5	1
**(United States) J Brown**	**7**	**6**
(South Africa) B Moir	4	**7**	3
**(West Germany) P Kühnen**	**6**	5	**6**
13	(United States) M Purcell	**6**	1	4
Q	**(Argentina) J Frana**	3	**6**	**6**
Q	(United States) D Cassidy	3	1
3	**(Sweden) K Carlsson**	**6**	**6**

Third round
(United States) J Brown	3	4
**(West Germany) P Kühnen**	**6**	**6**
Q	(Argentina) J Frana	4	4
3	**(Sweden) K Carlsson**	**6**	**6**

Quarterfinals
(West Germany) P Kühnen	6	1
3	**(Sweden) K Carlsson**	**7**	**6**

==== Section 4 ====
First round
**(Czechoslovakia) L Pimek**	3	**6**	**6**
(United States) M Davis	**6**	4	4
(Argentina) F Davín	**6**	4	1
**(Australia) S Youl**	4	**6**	**6**
(West Germany) P Moraing	4	4
10	**(Argentina) G Pérez Roldán**	**6**	**6**
15	**(United States) T Witsken**	**6**	**6**
(Sweden) T Högstedt	1	3
**(Argentina) C Miniussi**	**6**	**6**
(United States) B Cox	3	4
**(South Africa) G Muller**	**6**	**7**
(West Germany) T Meinecke	0	6

Second round
7	(France) T Tulasne	1	**6**	0
**(Czechoslovakia) L Pimek**	**6**	2	**6**
(Australia) S Youl	**6**	1	3
10	**(Argentina) G Pérez Roldán**	4	**6**	**6**
15	(United States) T Witsken	**6**	3	1
**(Argentina) C Miniussi**	3	**6**	**6**
**(South Africa) G Muller**	**6**	4	**6**
2	(Ecuador) A Gómez	4	**6**	4

Third round
(Czechoslovakia) L Pimek	3	0
10	**(Argentina) G Pérez Roldán**	**6**	**6**
(Argentina) C Miniussi	6	3
**(South Africa) G Muller**	**7**	**6**

Quarterfinals
10	**(Argentina) G Pérez Roldán**	1	**6**	**6**
(South Africa) G Muller	**6**	3	4
