= Fernando García Lleó =

Spanish tennis player (born 1966)

- Country (sports): Spain
- Born: September 25, 1966 (age 58); Las Palmas, Spain
- Height: 1.88 m (6 ft 2 in)
- Plays: Right-handed
- Prize money: US$8,280

Singles
- Career record: 0–0
- Career titles: 0
- Highest ranking: No. 163 (15 September 1986)

Doubles
- Career record: 0–1
- Career titles: 0
- Highest ranking: No. 312 (15 September 1986)
Medal record
Mediterranean Games
Bronze medal – third place	1987 Latakia	Singles
Bronze medal – third place	1987 Latakia	Doubles
- Last updated on: March 27, 2019.

Fernando García Lleó (born September 25, 1966) is a former Spanish tennis player who won two bronze medals at the 1987 Mediterranean Games.

His only ATP Tour main draw appearance came at the 1986 Madrid Open in doubles, partnering with Aniceto Álvarez.

Also in doubles, he won the title at the 1990 Open Castilla y León, this time partnering with Jesús Manteca. They defeated Francisco Clavet and Javier Sánchez in the final.

== Challenger finals ==
=== Singles: 1 (0–1) ===
Result	W–L	Date	Tournament	Tier	Surface	Opponent	Score
Loss	0–1	July 1986	Dortmund, Germany	Challenger	Clay	(Austria) Horst Skoff	6-2, 3–6, 4–6
