= 1986 Madrid Open =

- Date: 28 April – 4 May
- Edition: 15th
- Category: Grand Prix
- Draw: 32S / 16D
- Prize money: $85,000
- Surface: Clay / outdoor
- Location: Madrid, Spain
- Venue: Club de Campo Villa de Madrid

Champions

Singles
- (Sweden) Joakim Nyström

Doubles
- (Sweden) Anders Järryd / (Sweden) Joakim Nyström
- Madrid Tennis Grand Prix

The 1986 Madrid Open was a men's tennis tournament played on outdoor clay courts at the Club de Campo Villa de Madrid in Madrid, Spain that was part of the 1986 Nabisco Grand Prix circuit. It was the 15th edition of the tournament and was played from 28 April until 4 May 1986. First-seeded Joakim Nyström won the singles title and earned $17,000 first-prize money.

== Finals ==
=== Singles ===
(Sweden) Joakim Nyström defeated (Sweden) Kent Carlsson 6–1, 6–1

- It was Nyström's 5th singles title and the 12th of his career.

=== Doubles ===
(Sweden) Anders Järryd / (Sweden) Joakim Nyström defeated (Spain) Jesús Colás / (Spain) David de Miguel 6–2, 6–2

- It was Järryd's 2nd doubles title of the year and the 24th of his career. It was Nyström's 2nd doubles title of the year and the 5th of his career.
