= Jon Treml =

American tennis player

- Country (sports): United States

Singles
- Highest ranking: No. 449 (Jun 23, 1986)

Doubles
- Career record: 1–3
- Highest ranking: No. 213 (Oct 19, 1987)

Jon Treml is an American former professional tennis player.

Treml, who grew up in Akron, Ohio, played collegiate tennis for Northeast Louisiana University from 1983 to 1986, appearing in the NCAA Division 1. He was a four-time All-SLC selection and the flight one singles champion in 1984.

On the professional tour, Treml had best rankings of 449 in singles and 213 in doubles. He made the round of 16 in doubles at the 1987 Torneo Godó and won an ATP Challenger doubles title that year in Winnetka.

== ATP Challenger finals ==
=== Doubles: 1 (1–0) ===
Result	No.	Date	Tournament	Surface	Partner	Opponents	Score
Win	1.	Aug 1987	Winnetka, U.S.	Hard	(Sweden) Tobias Svantesson	(South Africa) Pieter Aldrich (South Africa) Warren Green	6–3, 6–4
