= Greg Hill (tennis) =

American tennis player

- Country (sports): United States
- Born: January 4, 1963 (age 63) Henderson, Kentucky, U.S.

Singles
- Highest ranking: No. 478 (1988.08.15)

Doubles
- Career record: 0-1
- Highest ranking: No. 288 (1986.12.01)

Greg Hill (born January 4, 1963) is an American former professional tennis player.

Born in Henderson, Kentucky, Hill was a collegiate tennis player for Texas A&M from 1982 to 1985. He set a team for most singles wins (85) and earned All-American honors for doubles in 1984.

Hill played professional tennis in the 1980s, reaching best rankings of 478 in singles and 288 in doubles. In 1987 he competed in the doubles main draw of the U.S. Clay Court Championships in Boston.
