= 1989 Torneo Godó – Singles =

Singles
- 1989 Torneo Godó

Final
- Champion: (Ecuador) Andrés Gómez
- Runner-up: (Austria) Horst Skoff
- Score: 6–4, 6–4, 6–2

Details
- Draw: 56 (5WC/7Q/2SE)
- Seeds: 16

Events
Singles	Doubles
- Barcelona Open

Kent Carlsson was the defending champion, but could not compete this year due to a persisting knee injury.

Andrés Gómez won the title by defeating Horst Skoff 6–4, 6–4, 6–2 in the final.

== Seeds ==
The first eight seeds received a bye into the second round.

1. (Czechoslovakia) Ivan Lendl (semifinals)
2. (Austria) Horst Skoff (quarterfinals)
3. (Argentina) Alberto Mancini (semifinals)
4. (Argentina) Martín Jaite (quarterfinals)
5. (West Germany) Carl-Uwe Steeb (quarterfinals)
6. (Spain) Emilio Sánchez (third round)
7. (Czechoslovakia) Miloslav Mečíř (second round)
8. (Spain) Sergi Bruguera (third round)
9. (Italy) Paolo Canè (first round)
10. (Austria) Horst Skoff (final)
11. (Peru) Jaime Yzaga (first round)
12. (Ecuador) Andrés Gómez (champion)
13. (Socialist Federal Republic of Yugoslavia) Goran Prpić (third round)
14. (Argentina) Guillermo Pérez Roldán (second round)
15. (France) Henri Leconte (third round)
16. (Spain) Jordi Arrese (third round)

== Draw ==
Key

- Q = Qualifier
- WC = Wild card
- LL = Lucky loser
- Alt = Alternate
- ITF = ITF entry
- PR = Protected ranking
- SR = Special ranking
- SE = Special exempt
- JE = Junior exempt
- JR = Junior Accelerator Programme entrant
- CO = College Accelerator Programme entrant
- NG = Next Gen Accelerator Program entrant
- w/o = Walkover
- r = Retired
- d = Defaulted

=== Finals ===
Quarterfinals
1	(Czechoslovakia) Ivan Lendl	6	7
(Uruguay) Marcelo Filippini	4	6
4	(Argentina) Martín Jaite	7	4	3
12	(Ecuador) Andrés Gómez	6	6	6
5	(West Germany) Carl-Uwe Steeb	6	4	10
3	(Argentina) Alberto Mancini	4	6	12
10	(Austria) Horst Skoff	6	6
2	(Austria) Thomas Muster	4	3

Semifinals
1	(Czechoslovakia) Ivan Lendl	6	6	7
12	(Ecuador) Andrés Gómez	1	7	9
3	(Argentina) Alberto Mancini	6	2	3
10	(Austria) Horst Skoff	1	6	6

Final
12	(Ecuador) Andrés Gómez	6	6	6
10	(Austria) Horst Skoff	4	4	2

=== Top half ===
==== Section 1 ====
First round
(Spain) J Sánchez	6	6
(Czechoslovakia) M Vajda	0	2
(United States) L Duncan	6	4	6
Q	(Spain) JL Aparisi	3	6	4
(Socialist Federal Republic of Yugoslavia) G Ivanišević	1	3
16	(Spain) J Arrese	6	6
9	(Italy) P Canè	2	4
(Uruguay) M Filippini	6	6
(Brazil) L Mattar	2	6
Q	(France) T Benhabiles	6	7
(Czechoslovakia) J Čihák	6	1	0
(Spain) T Carbonell	4	6	6

Second round
1	(Czechoslovakia) I Lendl	6	6	6
(Spain) J Sánchez	3	7	3
(United States) L Duncan	6	2
16	(Spain) J Arrese	7	6
(Uruguay) M Filippini	6	6
Q	(France) T Benhabiles	4	3
(Spain) T Carbonell	1	6	3
8	(Spain) S Bruguera	6	4	6

Third round
1	(Czechoslovakia) I Lendl	2	6	6
16	(Spain) J Arrese	6	2	3
(Uruguay) M Filippini	4	7	6
8	(Spain) S Bruguera	6	6	0

Quarterfinals
1	(Czechoslovakia) I Lendl	6	7
(Uruguay) M Filippini	4	6

==== Section 2 ====
First round
Q	(Chile) S Cortés	6	6
(Brazil) C Motta	3	2
(Czechoslovakia) K Nováček	6	6	8
(Argentina) R Azar	7	3	6
(Sweden) M Gustafsson	3	3
13	(Socialist Federal Republic of Yugoslavia) G Prpić	6	6
12	(Ecuador) A Gómez	6	6
WC	(Spain) D de Miguel	4	4
SE	(Spain) S Casal	6	6
(West Germany) U Riglewski	1	4
WC	(Spain) F Roig	6	6
(Socialist Federal Republic of Yugoslavia) B Orešar	0	1

Second round
4	(Argentina) M Jaite	2	6	6
Q	(Chile) S Cortés	6	3	3
(Czechoslovakia) K Nováček	2	3
13	(Socialist Federal Republic of Yugoslavia) G Prpić	6	6
12	(Ecuador) A Gómez	6	6
SE	(Spain) S Casal	4	4
WC	(Spain) F Roig	7	3	2^{r}
6	(Spain) E Sánchez	5	6	5

Third round
4	(Argentina) M Jaite	2	6	6
13	(Socialist Federal Republic of Yugoslavia) G Prpić	6	2	4
12	(Ecuador) A Gómez	6	6
6	(Spain) E Sánchez	4	3

Quarterfinals
4	(Argentina) M Jaite	7	4	3
12	(Ecuador) A Gómez	6	6	6

=== Bottom half ===
==== Section 3 ====
First round
(Italy) D Nargiso	7	6
(United States) J Brown	6	1
(France) J Potier	2	6	2
(Uruguay) D Pérez	6	0	6
(Italy) F Cancellotti	6	6
11	(Peru) J Yzaga	0	3
14	(Argentina) G Pérez Roldán	6	6
Q	(Spain) JF Altur	1	0
Q	(Spain) M Górriz	6	6	2
(Sweden) L Jönsson	7	1	6
WC	(Spain) J Avendaño	1	2
Q	(Spain) Nicolás Romero	6	6

Second round
5	(West Germany) CU Steeb	1	6	10
(Italy) D Nargiso	6	1	8
(Uruguay) D Pérez	7	2	6
(Italy) F Cancellotti	6	6	2
14	(Argentina) G Pérez Roldán	3	6	5
(Sweden) L Jönsson	6	4	7
Q	(Spain) Nicolás Romero	1	4
3	(Argentina) A Mancini	6	6

Third round
5	(West Germany) CU Steeb	6	6
(Uruguay) D Pérez	2	2
(Sweden) L Jönsson	3	4
3	(Argentina) A Mancini	6	6

Quarterfinals
5	(West Germany) CU Steeb	6	4	10
3	(Argentina) A Mancini	4	6	12

==== Section 4 ====
First round
(Spain) J Aguilera	7	6
SE	(Argentina) F Yunis	5	3
(Sweden) T Haldin	5	6
(Spain) F Luna	7	7
(Argentina) E Bengoechea	0	7	1
10	(Austria) H Skoff	6	6	6
15	(France) H Leconte	7	6	6
WC	(Spain) G López	6	7	2
(Czechoslovakia) M Střelba	6	0	4
(Spain) C Costa	1	6	6
(France) T Tulasne	6	1	4
Q	(Mexico) A Moreno	4	6	6

Second round
7/WC	(Czechoslovakia) M Mečíř	3	5
(Spain) J Aguilera	6	7
(Spain) F Luna	0	0^{r}
10	(Austria) H Skoff	6	4
15	(France) H Leconte	6	6
(Spain) C Costa	0	3
Q	(Mexico) A Moreno	4	2
2	(Austria) T Muster	6	6

Third round
(Spain) J Aguilera	2	4
10	(Austria) H Skoff	6	6
15	(France) H Leconte	2	2
2	(Austria) T Muster	6	6

Quarterfinals
10	(Austria) H Skoff	6	6
2	(Austria) T Muster	4	3
