= 1987 Torneo Godó =

- Date: 21–27 September
- Edition: 35th
- Category: Grand Prix
- Draw: 64S / 32D
- Prize money: $232,000
- Surface: Clay / outdoor
- Location: Barcelona, Catalonia, Spain
- Venue: Real Club de Tenis Barcelona

Champions

Singles
- (Argentina) Martín Jaite

Doubles
- (Czechoslovakia) Miloslav Mečíř / (Czechoslovakia) Tomáš Šmíd
← 1986 ·	Torneo Godó	· 1988 →

The 1987 Torneo Godó was a men's professional tennis tournament that took place on outdoor clay courts at the Real Club de Tenis Barcelona in Barcelona, Catalonia in Spain that was part of the 1987 Grand Prix circuit. It was the 35th edition of the tournament and took place from 21 September to 27 September 1987. Fifth-seeded Martín Jaite won the singles title.

This event also carried the joint denomination of the Campeonatos Internacionales de España or Spanish International Championships that was hosted at this venue and location, and was 20th edition to be held in Barcelona, and also carried the joint denomination of the Trofeo Winston Super Series and was the 1st edition branded under that name.

== Finals ==
=== Singles ===
(Argentina) Martín Jaite defeated (Sweden) Mats Wilander 7–6^{(7–5)}, 6–4, 4–6, 0–6, 6–4

- It was Jaite's 1st singles title and the 4th of his career.

=== Doubles ===
(Czechoslovakia) Miloslav Mečíř / (Czechoslovakia) Tomáš Šmíd defeated (Argentina) Javier Frana / (Argentina) Christian Miniussi 6–1, 6–2
