= Pablo Carreño Busta =

Spanish tennis player (born 1991)

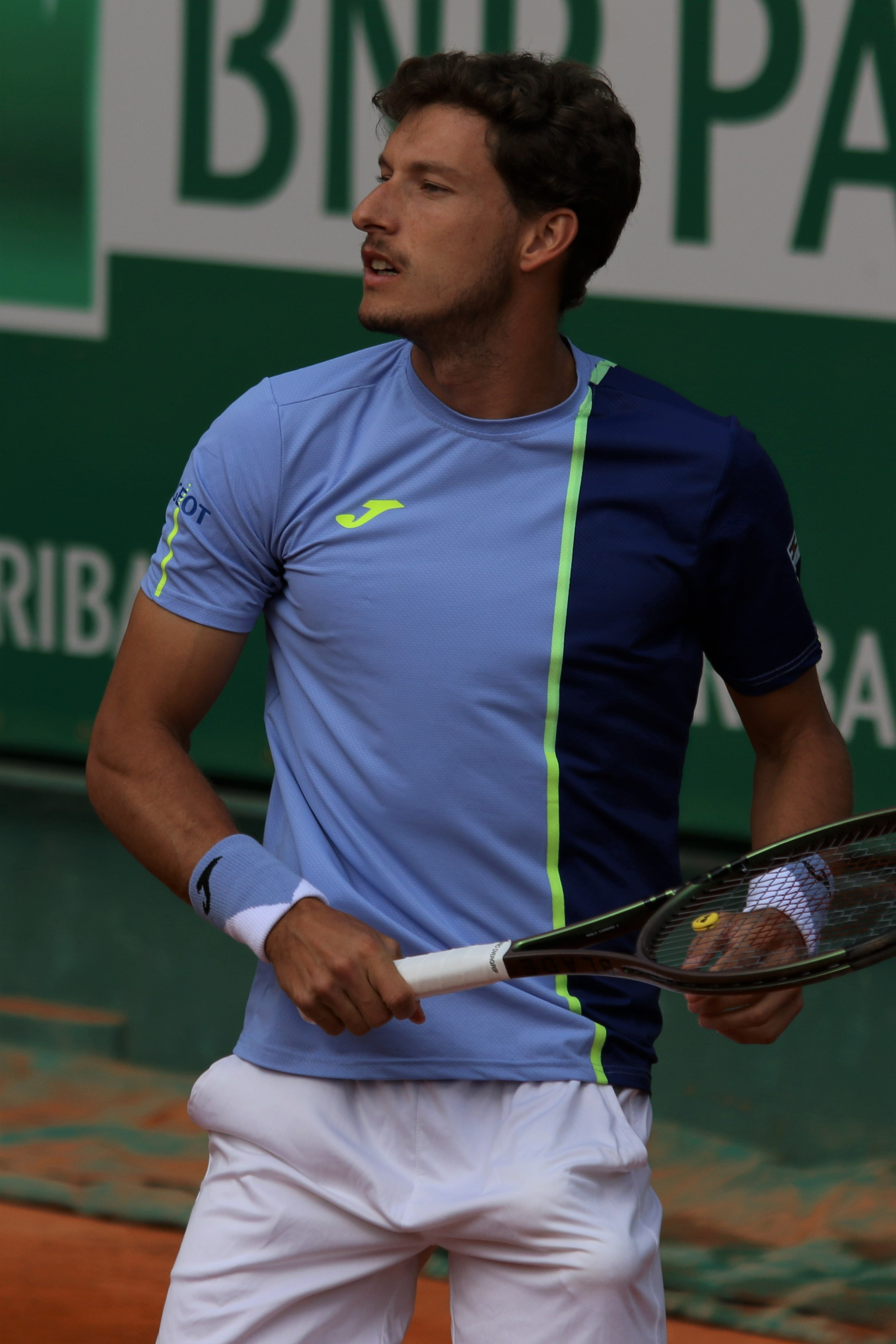
- Carreño Busta at the 2022 Monte Carlo Masters
- Country (sports): Spain
- Residence: Barcelona, Spain
- Born: 12 July 1991 (age 35) Gijón, Spain
- Height: 1.88 m (6 ft 2 in)
- Turned pro: 2009
- Plays: Right-handed (two-handed backhand)
- Coach: Samuel López (2015–2024); César Fábregas (2015–2024); Víctor López Morón (2024–)
- Prize money: US $18,986,415: 45th all-time leader in earnings

Singles
- Career record: 295–249 (Note: in ATP World Tour and Grand Slam main draw matches, and in Davis Cup)
- Career titles: 7
- Highest ranking: No. 10 (11 September 2017)
- Current ranking: No. 77 (9 November 2026)

Grand Slam singles results
- Australian Open: 4R (2018, 2019, 2022)
- French Open: QF (2017, 2020)
- Wimbledon: 2R (2026)
- US Open: SF (2017, 2020)

Other tournaments
- Tour Finals: RR (2017)
- Olympic Games: Bronze (2021)

Doubles
- Career record: 101–102
- Career titles: 4
- Highest ranking: No. 16 (17 July 2017)

Grand Slam doubles results
- Australian Open: SF (2017)
- French Open: 2R (2015, 2016)
- Wimbledon: 2R (2019)
- US Open: F (2016)

Other doubles tournaments
- Olympic Games: 2R (2024)

Team competitions
- Davis Cup: W (2019)
Medal record
Representing Spain
Olympic Games
| Bronze medal – third place | 2020 Tokyo | Singles |
- Last updated on: 31 August 2026.

Pablo Carreño Busta (Spanish pronunciation: [ˈpaβlo kaˈreɲo ˈβusta]; (Note: In isolation, Busta is pronounced [ˈbusta].) born 12 July 1991) is a Spanish professional tennis player. He has been ranked as high as world No. 10 by the ATP, achieved on 11 September 2017. He has won seven singles titles on the ATP Tour, including a Masters 1000 title at the Canadian Open, and achieved his best major results at the US Open, reaching the semifinals of the 2017 and 2020 editions. Representing Spain, Carreño Busta has won an Olympic bronze medal in men's singles at the 2020 Tokyo Olympics, defeating world No. 1 Novak Djokovic in the bronze match. He also was a member of the Spanish team that won the 2019 Davis Cup.

In doubles, Carreño Busta has won four titles and reached a career-high doubles ranking of No. 16 on 17 July 2017. His doubles career highlights include a runner-up finish at the 2016 US Open, partnering Guillermo García López, and a victory at the 2020 Cincinnati Masters, partnering Alex de Minaur.

== Career ==
=== Juniors ===
Carreño Busta reached as high as world No. 6 in the combined junior world rankings in February 2009.

=== 2009–13: Early pro tour, Grand Slam debut ===
His first appearance in an ATP Tour tournament was at the 2011 Barcelona Open, where he lost in the first round to Benoît Paire.

He has reached 18 singles finals competing in ITF Futures tournaments; and won eleven of these: one in 2009, one in 2010, three in 2011, and six in 2013. He also won two challenger titles from two finals in 2011, and at this point reached a career high singles ranking of no. 133. He missed the majority of the 2012 season due to injury, and underwent surgery on his back later that year. Carreño returned towards the latter stages of 2012, after five months of recovery, and played in four Futures tournaments to end the year, all in Morocco, although he did not progress past the semi-final stage in any. He ended the year with a singles ranking of No. 715.

After a strong start to the opening three months of 2013, winning 42 out of 43 matches on the ITF Circuit, Carreño Busta entered the qualification stage of the 2013 Grand Prix Hassan II in April, held in Casablanca, Morocco. He won his three qualifying matches, and then beat first seed and two-time Grand Prix Hassan II champion, Pablo Andújar, 6–4, 2–6, 6–3. He lost in the following round to eventual runner-up, Kevin Anderson. Later on that month, Carreño Busta reached the semi-final stage of the 2013 Portugal Open, again progressing through the qualification rounds, before losing to Stan Wawrinka in three sets.

Carreño Busta participated in his first ever Grand Slam tournament when he was a qualifier at the 2013 French Open. He won his three qualification matches, before losing to Roger Federer in straight sets in the opening round.

=== 2016: Breakthrough, first ATP title, US Open doubles final, top 40 ===
In April, Carreño Busta reached his second ATP final at ATP Estoril after defeating Benoît Paire. He was defeated in the finals by compatriot Nicolás Almagro. In August, he won his first ever ATP singles title at the 2016 Winston-Salem Open, defeating compatriot Roberto Bautista Agut in the final. As a result, he entered the top 40 of the ATP rankings for the first time at world No. 39 on 29 August 2016.

=== 2017: Grand Slam success, Top Ten & ATP Finals debut ===
After a quarterfinal appearance in Sydney, Carreño Busta reached the third round of the Australian Open losing to Denis Istomin. He also made the semifinals of the doubles alongside Guillermo García López. In Buenos Aires, he lost to the eventual champion Alexandr Dolgopolov in straight sets in the semifinals. The following week, Carreño Busta reached his first ATP 500 final at the Rio Open, saving a match point against rising teen Casper Ruud en route before losing to Dominic Thiem. However, he won the doubles title with Pablo Cuevas. In São Paulo, he fell to Cuevas, his doubles partner, the two-time defending and eventual champion in the semifinals.

At the Indian Wells Open in March, Carreño Busta avenged his defeat to Cuevas, saving two match points in the process to advance to his first ATP Masters 1000 semifinal where he lost to world No. 3, Stan Wawrinka, in straight sets. As a result, he rose to a new career high of world No. 19. He received a first round bye at the Miami Open but was upset by Federico Delbonis in the second. In Spain's quarterfinal Davis Cup tie against Serbia, he lost both of his matches to Viktor Troicki in singles and to Troicki and Nenad Zimonjić in doubles.

Carreño Busta began his clay-court season at the Monte-Carlo Masters, where he lost to world No. 2 Novak Djokovic, in three sets in the third round. He reached the same round in Barcelona, losing to lucky loser Yūichi Sugita who had defeated Tommy Robredo and Richard Gasquet in the first two rounds. After early losses in Madrid and Rome, Carreño Busta played his maiden Grand Slam quarterfinal at the French Open, upsetting eleventh seed Grigor Dimitrov in straight sets and fifth seed Milos Raonic in five sets en route. In his quarterfinal against compatriot Rafael Nadal, Carreño Busta was forced to retire at a set and 0–2 down due to injury.

At the US Open he made his first Grand Slam semifinal without dropping a set, beating Diego Schwartzman at the quarterfinal stage. He then lost to Kevin Anderson in four sets. At the year-end ATP Finals, he served as an Alternate in replacement of Rafael Nadal, who withdrew from playing his first round. Carreño Busta then went on lose to Dominic Thiem and to eventual champion Grigor Dimitrov. His year end ranking was No. 10.

=== 2018: First Masters doubles final & second singles semifinal ===
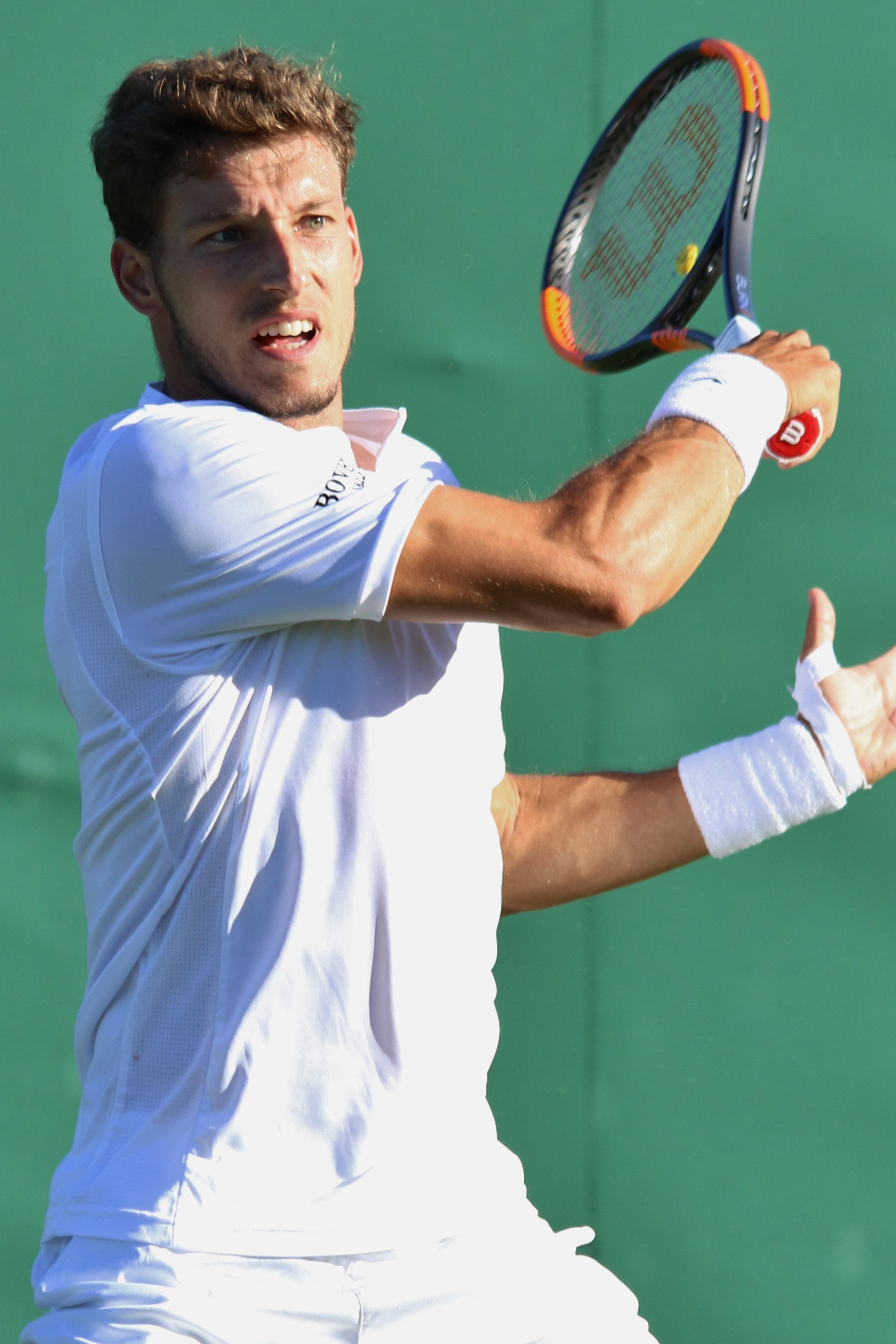
Carreño Busta at the 2018 Wimbledon Championships

At the Australian Open, Carreño Busta defeated Jason Kubler, Gilles Simon, and Gilles Müller to advance to the fourth round, where he lost in a close four set match to eventual finalist Marin Čilić. At the Miami Masters, Carreño Busta was seeded 16th. He defeated Denis Istomin, Steve Johnson, 31st seed Fernando Verdasco, and sixth seed Kevin Anderson, before losing to fourth seed Alexander Zverev in the semifinals.

Carreño Busta reached the semifinals of a second consecutive event at the Barcelona Open. He defeated Benoît Paire, Adrian Mannarino, and upset second seed Grigor Dimitrov before losing to unseeded Stefanos Tsitsipas in the semifinals. He then reached the semifinals of a third consecutive tournament at the Estoril Open before losing to Frances Tiafoe. After suffering an opening round loss at the Madrid Masters to Borna Ćorić, he followed up with a quarterfinal appearance at the Rome Masters, losing to Marin Čilić. At the same tournament he reached his first Masters final in doubles partnering João Sousa. In the third round of the French Open, he was defeated by Marco Cecchinato. At Wimbledon, Carreño Busta was upset in the first round by unseeded Moldovan Radu Albot.

At the Cincinnati Masters, Carreño Busta made the quarterfinals where he was defeated again by Marin Čilić. He then reached the semifinals of the Winston-Salem Open, defeating 16th seed Peter Gojowczyk and sixth seed Chung Hyeon before losing to eighth seed Steve Johnson. At the US Open, Carreño Busta was upset by João Sousa in the second round. He suffered opening-round losses at both the Shanghai and Paris Masters.

=== 2019: Fourth ATP title and Davis Cup champion ===
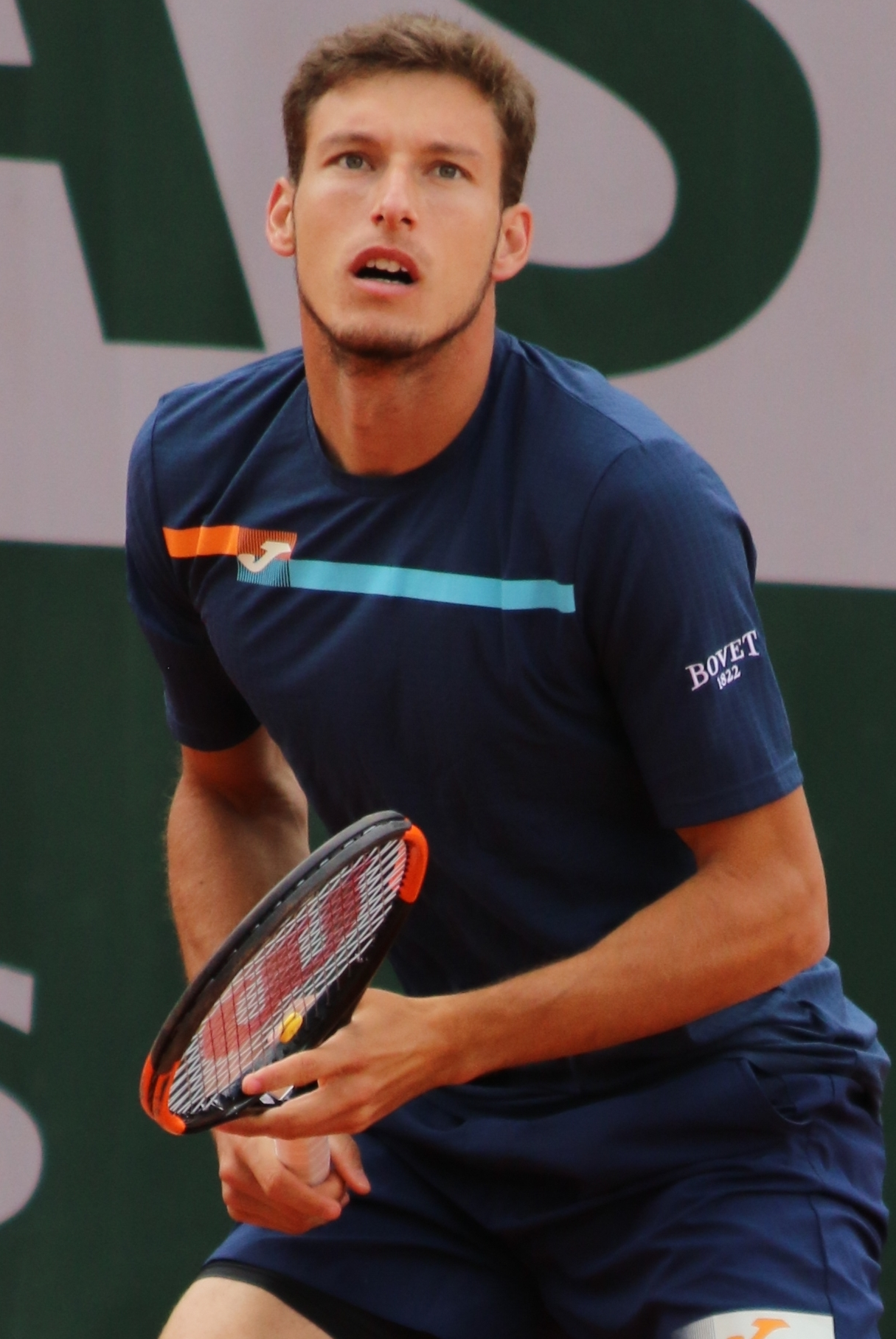
Carreño Busta at the 2019 French Open

Carreño Busta opened his 2019 season at the Auckland Open, facing David Ferrer, who retired just two games into the match. He was then defeated in a close three set match against Jan-Lennard Struff. At the Australian Open, Carreño Busta was seeded 23rd. He defeated Luca Vanni, Ilya Ivashka, and 12th seed Fabio Fognini to reach the fourth round, where he faced Kei Nishikori. Carreño Busta narrowly won the first two sets before losing a close third set tiebreak. Nishikori took the fourth, and the fifth eventually proceeded to a tiebreaker where Carreño Busta led the tiebreak until 8–5, when a late call from a linesperson sparked an argument between Carreño Busta and the umpire. Ultimately, Nishikori was awarded the point, and went on to win the next four points, winning the tiebreak 10–8. The match had lasted over five hours. After the match, Carreño Busta refused to shake the umpire's hand, and threw his bag onto the court before leaving the stadium amidst a booing crowd, but in a post-match conference, he apologized for his outburst.

After missing much of the rest of the season due to injury, Carreño Busta won his fourth ATP title at the Chengdu Open beating Denis Shapovalov in the semifinal and Alexander Bublik in the final. He was also part of the Spain team that won the 2019 Davis Cup.

=== 2020: Inaugural ATP Cup finalist, US semifinal & French Open quarterfinal ===
Carreño Busta's first major of the year was the Australian Open, where he lost his third round match to top-seeded Rafael Nadal.

Much of the 2020 season was interrupted by the COVID-19 pandemic. Carreño Busta's season resumed at the 2020 US Open, where he defeated Yasutaka Uchiyama in five sets in the first round, then Mitchell Krueger and Ričardas Berankis in straight sets. In the fourth round, he faced world No. 1 Novak Djokovic, who was unbeaten in 2020 before then. Carreño Busta was up a break, 6–5 in the first set, when Djokovic unintentionally hit a lineswoman in the throat with a ball. This defaulted Djokovic from the tournament, advancing Carreño Busta to the quarterfinals, where he defeated 12th seed Denis Shapovalov in five sets. He then lost to fifth seed Alexander Zverev in five sets in the semifinals despite being two sets up.

At the French Open, Carreño Busta was seeded 17th and reached the quarterfinals after victories against 10th seed Roberto Bautista Agut and Daniel Altmaier. In a rematch of the US Open, he faced Djokovic, to whom he lost in four sets.

=== 2021: 200th win, two ATP titles, Olympic bronze medalist ===
Carreño Busta won the first edition of the Andalucía Open in Marbella, Spain as the top seed by defeating Jaume Munar 6–1, 2–6, 6–4 in an all Spanish final. The win was also his 200th career win on the ATP Tour.

Carreño Busta won the biggest title of his career, and sixth title overall at Hamburg, when he defeated Filip Krajinović in straight sets in the final to win the title.

At the Olympics, Carreño Busta beat Tennys Sandgren, Marin Čilić, Dominik Koepfer and world No. 2 Daniil Medvedev to reach the semifinals. There, he lost to 12th seed Karen Khachanov in straight sets, but bounced back to defeat world No. 1 Novak Djokovic in three sets to claim the bronze medal.

At the US Open, Carreño Busta was upset in the first round by American qualifier Maxime Cressy, losing a two sets to love lead for the second consecutive year at the US Open and failing to convert four match points in the fifth set tiebreak.

=== 2022: ATP Cup and home finalist, Maiden Masters title ===
Carreño Busta began his 2022 season representing Spain at the ATP Cup. He went undefeated in singles in the group stage, recording victories over Alejandro Tabilo of Chile, Viktor Durasovic of Norway, and Filip Krajinović of Serbia, as Spain advanced to the semifinals. In the semifinals against Poland, Carreño Busta defeated Jan Zieliński to help Spain advance to the finals.

At the Barcelona Open, he defeated second seed Casper Ruud in the quarterfinals after saving three match points, following another three setter win in the round of 16 against Lorenzo Sonego in the same day. Then, Carreño Busta beat Diego Schwartzman in straight sets, after the match was suspended early in the first set and moved to the next day for his first all Spanish final in Barcelona against Carlos Alcaraz. He lost in the final in straight sets against Alcaraz. He lost in the first round in the French Open and at Wimbledon to Gilles Simon in five sets and to Dušan Lajović via retirement, respectively. At the Swedish Open in Båstad, he reached the semifinals defeating Diego Schwartzman in straight sets conceding only one game in the entire match. He fell to the eventual champion Francisco Cerundolo.

At the Canadian Open, he reached the quarterfinals at this Masters for the first time, defeating 11th seed Matteo Berrettini, Holger Rune and seventh seed Jannik Sinner. Next he reached his third semifinal at a Masters level defeating Jack Draper. In the semifinals, he defeated Briton Dan Evans to advance to his first career Masters 1000 final. He played eighth seed Hubert Hurkacz in the final and won the title to become the first unseeded player to win this event in 20 years since Guillermo Cañas in 2002 and the first player ranked outside the Top 20 since a No. 43-ranked Andrei Pavel the year before in 2001.

At the US Open, Carreño Busta reached the fourth round after defeating Dominic Thiem, Alexander Bublik, and Alex de Minaur. In the fourth round, he lost to Karen Khachanov in a five set match lasting more than 3 hours. He also reached the round of 16 at the 2022 Rolex Paris Masters where he lost to Tommy Paul.

=== 2023–24: Hiatus, surgery, back to ATP Tour ===
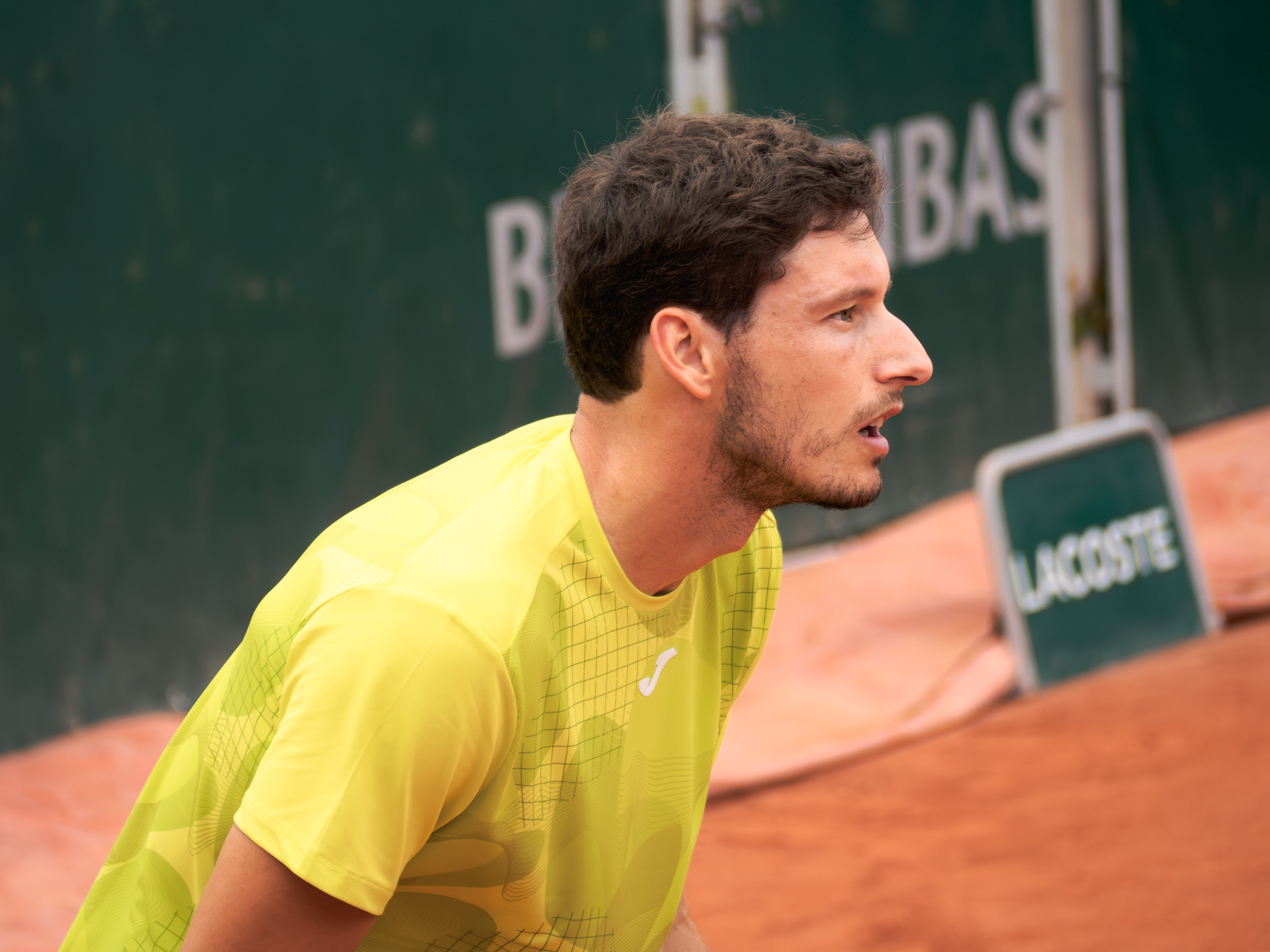
Carreño Busta at the 2024 French Open

Carreño Busta started his 2023 season at the Adelaide International 2. Seeded second, he lost in the second round to the eventual champion Kwon Soon-woo. Seeded 14th at the Australian Open, he lost in a second round five-set thriller to Benjamin Bonzi.

In February, Carreño Busta competed at the Rotterdam Open. Seeded seventh, he was eliminated in the first round by Richard Gasquet in three sets. He had to take eight months off from tennis to recover from an elbow injury.

In October 2023, Carreño Busta returned to the Challenger tour at the JC Ferrero Challenger and lost to compatriot Pedro Martínez in the first round. He entered the Málaga Open as a wildcard, defeating Arthur Cazaux before losing to Mattia Bellucci in the second round. In November, he underwent surgery for his elbow injury.

Following more than a six-month hiatus, he entered for the main draw of the 2024 French Open using protected ranking in singles and doubles and also the 2024 Olympics in doubles with compatriot Marcel Granollers, where he reached the second round.

Also using protected ranking, ranked No. 796, he entered the 2024 National Bank Open, playing in his first Masters event since 2022, he recorded his first ATP win since January 2023, over Fábián Marozsán. As a result, he returned a couple of positions shy of the top 500 on 12 August 2024, climbing close to 290 positions in the rankings. Ranked No. 513, at the 2024 Cincinnati Open, with first back-to-back wins in two years, over 16th seed Sebastian Korda and Max Purcell, he reached the third round and returned to the top 300 in the singles rankings on 19 August 2024, climbing more than 200 positions. Ranked No. 299, he received a main draw wildcard for the 2024 Winston-Salem Open and defeated qualifier Omni Kumar, 13th seed Alexander Shevchenko, Aleksandar Vukic and qualifier Learner Tien to reach his first ATP semifinal since 2022 in Montreal. As a result, he moved up the rankings into the top 225 on 26 August 2024.

=== 2025: Top 100, Challenger Titles and Davis Cup Finals ===
Carreño Busta started his season representing Spain at the United Cup, where Spain lost in the round robin. Then, he received a Lucky Loser entry at the ASB Classic in Aukland after losing in the first round of qualifying to eventual finalist Zizou Bergs. He lost out to Jakub Mensik in the first round.

At the Australian Open, using his protected ranking of World No. 18 to enter, Carreño Busta won his first round against qualifier Kamil Majchrzak in straights. He then lost in the second round to Ben Shelton in straights.

After losing in qualifying at the 2025 Open Occitanie, which brought his ranking back into the top 150, Carreño Busta entered both the Tenerife Challenger I & Tenerife Challenger II, winning both titles. After the back-to-back titles, he admitted he had "thought about retirement".

He then qualified for Indian Wells, however lost in the first round to Quentin Halys. He then lost in Murcia (1st round) and Girona (quarter-finals).

At the 2025 Grand Prix Hassan II in Marrakech Carreño Busta recorded his first clay win since October 2022 over local wildcard Younes Lalami Laaroussi. He returned to the top 100 on 14 April 2025 at world No. 99 prior to the 2025 Barcelona Open Banc Sabadell where he received a wildcard. He lost in the first round to eventual semi-finalist Arthur Fils.

Carreño Busta then entered Rome as a qualifier. Despite losing in second round qualifying (to Roman Andres Burruchaga), he received a Lucky Loser entry. He then lost in the first round to Camilo Ugo Carabelli in 3 sets.

He then entered Roland Garros, and won his first match at the tournament since 2021 against Francisco Comesana in straight sets. He then lost out to eventual quarter-finalist Frances Tiafoe in straight sets.

After some poor results at the Challenger level (in Lyon and Heilbronn), Carreño Busta attempted to play at Wimbledon, however pulled out last minute, likely due to injury, however this is not confirmed.

He then entered the National Bank Open in Toronto. He won the first round against wildcard Liam Draxl, however then lost the second round to Arthur Fils. After this, Carreño Busta lost in the first round of qualifying in Cincinnati to World No. 522 Leandro Riedi, then made the second round of the Winston-Salem Open, beating Yoshihito Nishioka, however losing out to Sebastian Baez, both in straights.

At the US Open, the two-time former semi-finalist won his first round against fellow countryman Pablo Llamas Ruiz in straights, his first win at the tournament since 2023, then lost out to Ben Shelton in the second round.

Then, after some Challenger Tour success, winning the Villena Open, where he made his professional debut, and making the final of the Olbia Challenger, Carreño Busta then competed for Spain in the 2025 Davis Cup Finals. He lost his first match against Jakub Mensik, however Spain prevailed 2-1 overall against Czechia, booking their spot in the semi-final. In the semi-final, Carreño Busta won his match against Jan-Lennard Struff, aiding Spain in a 2-1 win over Germany. In the final, he lost his match against Matteo Berrettini, helping a 2-0 win for Italy against Spain. This brought Carreño Busta's 2025 season to an end.

=== 2026: Continued Challenger success & French Open 4th round ===
Carreño Busta began his 2026 season in Australia. He qualified for the Brisbane International, and lost out to Grigor Dimitrov in the first round. He lost in the first round of qualifying at the ASB Classic, then lost in the first round of the Australian Open in 5 sets to Jakub Mensik, despite having break points to serve for the match in the 4th set.

Next, Carreño Busta, entered the Open Occitanie and won his first round against Miomir Kecmanovic in a 3rd set tiebreak. He then lost in the first round of qualifying at the ABN AMRO Open then qualified for the Qatar ExxonMobil Open, however lost out to Quentin Halys in the first round in 3 sets. He also received wildcard entry into the doubles in Doha, with Reda Bennani, however lost out to Halys and Pierre-Hugues Herbert in straights.

In Dubai, Carreño Busta came through a tight 3 set match against Luca Nardi in qualifying to enter the tournament. He then beat World No. 34 Denis Shapovalov in straights in the first round, then lost out to Jiri Lehecka in the second round.

Carreño Busta then won the Murcia Open (Challenger), beating fellow countryman Roberto Carballés Baena in the final. The next week, he made it to the final of the Montemar Challenger, losing out to Pablo Llamas Ruiz in the final. This brought his ranking back into the top 100.

After retiring from his first round qualifying match in Barcelona, Carreño Busta received wildcard entry into the Madrid Open, winning his first round against Marton Fucsovics in 3 sets, however then lost in straights to Alejandro Davidovich Fokina. Also, after a walkover from Stan Wawrinka in the second round of qualifying, he entered the Italian Open, however lost in straights to Alejandro Tabilo.

At the 2026 French Open, Carreño Busta won his first round against 12th seed Jiri Lehecka, and then won against Thanasi Kokkinakis, after the Australian retired in the third set. In the third round, he beat Thiago Agustín Tirante in 4 sets, setting up a 4th round encounter with rising star Rafael Jodar, whom he said "doesn't crumble under pressure". In the match, despite winning the first 2 sets, Jodar beat Carreño Busta in 5 sets. This was his best performance at the tournament since reaching the 4th round in 2021.

At Wimbledon, Carreño Busta earned his first ever main draw singles win at the tournament, after Denis Shapovalov retired after the second set in the first round. He then lost out, again, to Rafael Jodar in 5 sets over 2 days.

== Personal life ==
Carreño Busta was born in Gijón to parents Alfonso Carreño Morrondo and María Antonia Busta Vallina and has two sisters, Lucía and Alicia. He married tax advisor Claudia Díaz Borrego in December 2021. They welcomed their first child, a son, in 2025.

== Coaching ==
In 2015, Carreño Busta joined the Ferrero Tennis Academy in Alicante to train with coach Samuel López.

In December 2024, it was announced that he had split with coach López and the Ferrero Academy. In the beginning of the 2025 season, he started training at the TEC Carles Ferrer Salat in Barcelona with a new coach Víctor López Morón.

== Career statistics ==
=== Grand Slam performance timelines ===
Key
| W | F | SF | QF | #R | RR | Q# | P# | DNQ | A | Z# | PO | G | S | B | NMS | NTI | P | NH |

(W) winner; (F) finalist; (SF) semifinalist; (QF) quarterfinalist; (#R) rounds 4, 3, 2, 1; (RR) round-robin stage; (Q#) qualification round; (P#) preliminary round; (DNQ) did not qualify; (A) absent; (Z#) Davis/Fed Cup Zonal Group (with number indication) or (PO) play-off; (G) gold, (S) silver or (B) bronze Olympic/Paralympic medal; (NMS) not a Masters tournament; (NTI) not a Tier I tournament; (P) postponed; (NH) not held; (SR) strike rate (events won / competed); (W–L) win–loss record.
To avoid confusion and double counting, these charts are updated at the conclusion of a tournament or when the player's participation has ended.

==== Singles ====
Current through the 2026 US Open.

| Tournament | 2013 | 2014 | 2015 | 2016 | 2017 | 2018 | 2019 | 2020 | 2021 | 2022 | 2023 | 2024 | 2025 | 2026 | SR | W–L | Win% |
|---|---|---|---|---|---|---|---|---|---|---|---|---|---|---|---|---|---|
| Australian Open | A | 1R | 1R | 1R | 3R | 4R | 4R | 3R | 3R | 4R | 2R | A | 2R | 1R | 0 / 12 | 17–12 | 59% |
| French Open | 1R | 1R | 2R | 2R | QF | 3R | 3R | QF | 4R | 1R | A | 1R | 2R | 4R | 0 / 13 | 21–13 | 62% |
| Wimbledon | A | 1R | 1R | 1R | A | 1R | 1R | NH | 1R | 1R | A | A | A | 2R | 0 / 7 | 1–8 | 0% |
| US Open | A | 3R | 2R | 3R | SF | 2R | 3R | SF | 1R | 4R | A | 1R | 2R | 1R | 0 / 11 | 22–11 | 68% |
| Win–loss | 0–1 | 2–4 | 2–4 | 3–4 | 11–3 | 6–4 | 7–4 | 11–3 | 5–4 | 6–4 | 1–1 | 0–2 | 3–3 | 4–3 | 0 / 43 | 61–44 | 58% |

==== Doubles ====
| Tournament | 2014 | 2015 | 2016 | 2017 | 2018 | 2019 | 2020 | 2021 | 2022 | 2023 | 2024 | 2025 | SR | W–L | Win% |
|---|---|---|---|---|---|---|---|---|---|---|---|---|---|---|---|
| Australian Open | 3R | 2R | 3R | SF | 3R | 3R | 1R | 1R | A | A | A | 1R | 0 / 9 | 13–9 | 59% |
| French Open | A | 2R | 2R | 1R (Note: Pablo Carreño Busta and Guillermo García López walkover in the first-round match at the 2017 French Open against Paolo Lorenzi and Rogério Dutra Silva (so doesn't count as a loss).) | A | 1R | A | A | A | A | 1R | A | 0 / 5 | 2–4 | 33% |
| Wimbledon | A | 1R | 1R | A | 1R | 2R | NH | A | A | A | A | A | 0 / 4 | 1–4 | 20% |
| US Open | 1R | 1R | F | 1R | A | 2R | A | A | A | A | 1R | A | 0 / 6 | 6–6 | 50% |
| Win–loss | 2–2 | 2–4 | 8–4 | 4–2 | 2–2 | 4–4 | 0–1 | 0–1 | 0–0 | 0–0 | 0–2 | 0–1 | 0 / 24 | 22–23 | 49% |

=== Grand Slam final ===
==== Doubles: 1 (runner-up) ====
| Result | Year | Tournament | Surface | Partner | Opponents | Score |
|---|---|---|---|---|---|---|
| Loss | 2016 | US Open | Hard | (Spain) Guillermo García López | (United Kingdom) Jamie Murray (Brazil) Bruno Soares | 2–6, 3–6 |

=== Other significant finals ===
==== Summer Olympics (singles bronze medal) ====
| Result | Year | Tournament | Surface | Opponent | Score |
|---|---|---|---|---|---|
| Bronze | 2021 | Tokyo Summer Olympics | Hard | (Serbia) Novak Djokovic | 6–4, 6–7^{(6–8)}, 6–3 |

==== Singles: 1 (title) ====
| Result | Year | Tournament | Surface | Opponent | Score |
|---|---|---|---|---|---|
| Win | 2022 | Canadian Open | Hard | (Poland) Hubert Hurkacz | 3–6, 6–3, 6–3 |

==== Doubles: 2 (1 title, 1 runner-up) ====
| Result | Year | Tournament | Surface | Partner | Opponents | Score |
|---|---|---|---|---|---|---|
| Loss | 2018 | Italian Open | Clay | (Portugal) João Sousa | (Colombia) Juan Sebastián Cabal (Colombia) Robert Farah | 6–3, 4–6, [4–10] |
| Win | 2020 | Cincinnati Open | Hard | (Australia) Alex de Minaur | (United Kingdom) Jamie Murray (United Kingdom) Neal Skupski | 6–2, 7–5 |

== Notes ==
Awards
| Preceded by (Australia) Marinko Matosevic | ATP Most Improved Player; 2013 | Succeeded by (Spain) Roberto Bautista Agut |
