= 1987 U.S. Clay Court Championships =

- Date: July 13–19
- Edition: 19th
- Category: Grand Prix
- Draw: 56S / 28D
- Prize money: $300,000
- Surface: Clay / outdoor
- Location: Indianapolis, Indiana, US

Champions

Singles
- (Sweden) Mats Wilander

Doubles
- (Australia) Laurie Warder / (United States) Blaine Willenborg
- U.S. Clay Court Championships

The 1987 U.S. Clay Court Championships was a Grand Prix men's tennis tournament held in Indianapolis, Indiana in the United States. It was the 19th edition of the tournament held in the open era and the last in Indianapolis. First-seeded Mats Wilander won the singles title.

The tournament was moved to a summer date (July 13–19) after the previous year's spring event failed to attract top male players. The revised date clashed with the scheduled Virginia Slims of Newport so there was no women's event in 1987.

== Finals ==
=== Singles ===
(Sweden) Mats Wilander defeated (Sweden) Kent Carlsson 7–5, 6–3

- It was Wilander's 5th singles title of the year and the 26th of his career.

=== Doubles ===
(Australia) Laurie Warder / (United States) Blaine Willenborg defeated (Sweden) Joakim Nyström / (Sweden) Mats Wilander 6–0, 6–3
