= 1989 Torneo Godó – Doubles =

Doubles
- 1989 Torneo Godó

Final
- Champions: (Argentina) Gustavo Luza (Argentina) Christian Miniussi
- Runners-up: (Spain) Sergio Casal (Czechoslovakia) Tomáš Šmíd
- Score: 6–3, 6–3

Details
- Draw: 28 (3WC)
- Seeds: 8

Events
Singles	Doubles
← 1988 ·	Barcelona Open	· 1990 →

Sergio Casal and Emilio Sánchez were the defending champions, but chose to compete this year with different partners.

Sánchez teamed up with his brother Javier Sánchez and lost in the quarterfinals to Gustavo Luza and Christian Miniussi.

Casal teamed up with Tomáš Šmíd and finished the tournament as runners-up, also losing to Luza and Miniussi. The score was 6–3, 6–3.

== Seeds ==
The first four seeds received a bye into the second round.

1. (Spain) Emilio Sánchez / (Spain) Javier Sánchez (quarterfinals)
2. (Spain) Sergio Casal / (Czechoslovakia) Tomáš Šmíd (final)
3. (Peru) Carlos di Laura / (Uruguay) Marcelo Filippini (second round)
4. (Spain) Tomás Carbonell / (Spain) Carlos Costa (second round)
5. (Socialist Federal Republic of Yugoslavia) Goran Ivanišević / (Italy) Diego Nargiso (quarterfinals)
6. (Denmark) Michael Mortensen / (Brazil) Cássio Motta (semifinals)
7. (Mexico) Agustín Moreno / (Peru) Jaime Yzaga (first round)
8. (Czechoslovakia) Josef Čihák / (Czechoslovakia) Miloslav Mečíř (first round)

== Draw ==
=== Key ===
- Q = Qualifier
- WC = Wild card
- LL = Lucky loser
- Alt = Alternate
- ITF = ITF entry
- PR = Protected ranking
- SR = Special ranking
- SE = Special exempt
- JE = Junior exempt
- JR = Junior Accelerator Programme entrant
- CO = College Accelerator Programme entrant
- NG = Next Gen Accelerator Program entrant
- w/o = Walkover
- r = Retired
- d = Defaulted

=== Finals ===
Semifinals
(Argentina) Gustavo Luza (Argentina) Christian Miniussi	6	7^{7}
6	(Denmark) Michael Mortensen (Brazil) Cássio Motta	2	6^{4}
(Argentina) Martín Jaite (Uruguay) Diego Pérez	3	4
2	(Spain) Sergio Casal (Czechoslovakia) Tomáš Šmíd	6	6

Final
(Argentina) Gustavo Luza (Argentina) Christian Miniussi	6	6
2	(Spain) Sergio Casal (Czechoslovakia) Tomáš Šmíd	3	3

=== Top half ===
First round
(Brazil) L Mattar (Puerto Rico) M Nido	7^{7}	6^{5}	7
(Spain) J Colás (Spain) F Roig	6^{5}	7^{7}	5
(Argentina) G Luza (Argentina) C Miniussi	6	6
(United States) B Dickinson (Austria) H Skoff	2	4
(Spain) M Górriz (Spain) J Clavet	6^{4}	6	6
7	(Mexico) A Moreno (Peru) J Yzaga	7^{7}	4	4
WC	(Spain) D de Miguel (Spain) G López	6	7	4
(Czechoslovakia) I Lendl (United States) B Willenborg	7	6	6
(Spain) JC Báguena (Spain) B Uribe	6	6
WC	(Spain) J Avendaño (Spain) A Tous	1	2
(Spain) F Clavet (Sweden) M Gustafsson	5	7	5
6	(Denmark) M Mortensen (Brazil) C Motta	7	5	7

Second round
1	(Spain) E Sánchez (Spain) J Sánchez	6	6^{1}	6
(Brazil) L Mattar (Puerto Rico) M Nido	3	7^{7}	3
(Argentina) G Luza (Argentina) C Miniussi	6	6
(Spain) M Górriz (Spain) J Clavet	4	4
4	(Spain) T Carbonell (Spain) C Costa	3	6	2
(Czechoslovakia) I Lendl (United States) B Willenborg	6	3	6
(Spain) JC Báguena (Spain) B Uribe	3	3
6	(Denmark) M Mortensen (Brazil) C Motta	6	6

Quarterfinals
1	(Spain) E Sánchez (Spain) J Sánchez	4	6	6
(Argentina) G Luza (Argentina) C Miniussi	6	3	8
(Czechoslovakia) I Lendl (United States) B Willenborg	6	3	4
6	(Denmark) M Mortensen (Brazil) C Motta	3	6	6

Semifinals
(Argentina) G Luza (Argentina) C Miniussi	6	7^{7}
6	(Denmark) M Mortensen (Brazil) C Motta	2	6^{4}

=== Bottom half ===
First round
5	(Socialist Federal Republic of Yugoslavia) G Ivanišević (Italy) D Nargiso	6	6
(Argentina) G Giussani (Argentina) M Ingaramo	2	4
(Argentina) E Bengoechea (Argentina) G Pérez Roldán	3	4
(Venezuela) A Mora (United States) J Schor	6	6
WC	(Spain) J Arrese (Spain) S Bruguera	6^{5}	4
(Argentina) M Jaite (Uruguay) D Pérez	7^{7}	6
8	(Czechoslovakia) J Čihák (Czechoslovakia) M Mečíř	4	4
(Switzerland) H Günthardt (Hungary) B Taróczy	6	6
(Socialist Federal Republic of Yugoslavia) B Orešar (Socialist Federal Republic of Yugoslavia) G Prpić	6^{2}	6	13
(Czechoslovakia) K Nováček (Czechoslovakia) M Vajda	7^{7}	3	15
(Italy) P Canè (Italy) F Mordegan	0	6^{5}
(Ecuador) A Gómez (Argentina) A Mancini	6	7^{7}

Second round
5	(Socialist Federal Republic of Yugoslavia) G Ivanišević (Italy) D Nargiso	4	6	6
(Venezuela) A Mora (United States) J Schor	6	3	3
(Argentina) M Jaite (Uruguay) D Pérez	7^{7}	5	6
3	(Peru) C di Laura (Uruguay) M FIlippini	6^{3}	7	3
(Switzerland) H Günthardt (Hungary) B Taróczy	7^{7}	4	3
(Czechoslovakia) K Nováček (Czechoslovakia) M Vajda	6^{2}	6	6
(Ecuador) A Gómez (Argentina) A Mancini	4	4
2	(Spain) S Casal (Czechoslovakia) T Šmíd	6	6

Quarterfinals
5	(Socialist Federal Republic of Yugoslavia) G Ivanišević (Italy) D Nargiso	6^{5}	7	3
(Argentina) M Jaite (Uruguay) D Pérez	7^{7}	5	6
(Czechoslovakia) K Nováček (Czechoslovakia) M Vajda	7	3	7
2	(Spain) S Casal (Czechoslovakia) T Šmíd	5	6	9

Semifinals
(Argentina) M Jaite (Uruguay) D Pérez	3	4
2	(Spain) S Casal (Czechoslovakia) T Šmíd	6	6
