= Samuel López (tennis coach) =

Spanish tennis coach

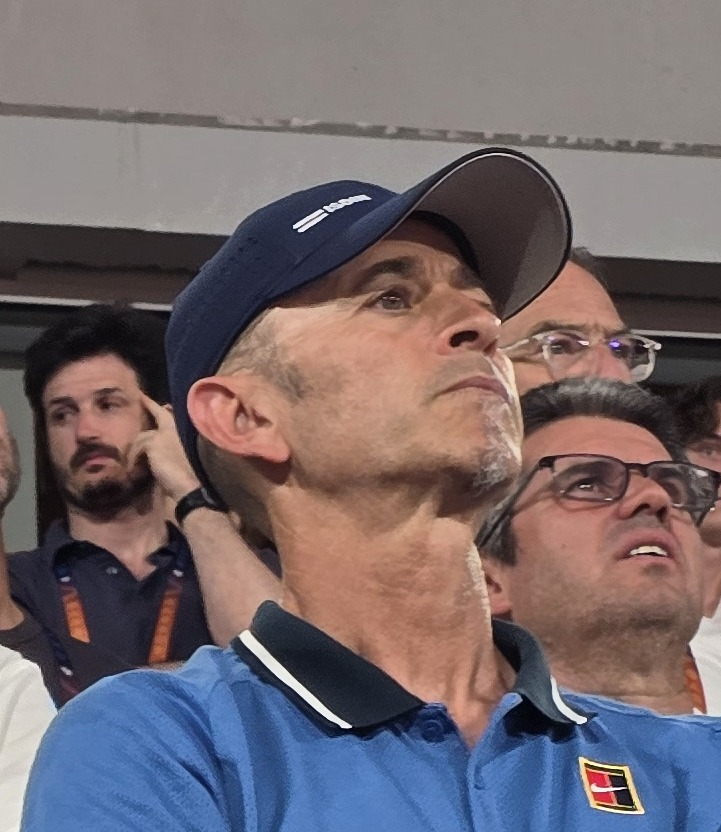
- Full name: Samuel López Jareño
- Country (sports): Spain
- Born: 1 February 1970 (age 56) Alicante, Spain

Coaching career
- Guillermo García López; Santiago Ventura Bertomeu; Mariusz Fyrstenberg; Pablo Carreño Busta (2015–2024); Carlos Alcaraz (2024–)

Coaching achievements
- List of notable tournaments (with champion): 1x Davis Cup (Carreño Busta); 1x French Open (Alcaraz); 1x US Open (Alcaraz); 1x Australian Open (Alcaraz); 3x ATP Tour Masters 1000 (Alcaraz)
- Last updated on: 1 February 2026.

Samuel López Jareño (born 1 February 1970) is a Spanish tennis coach.

In 1990, López helped Antonio Martínez Cascales found the Equelite Academy (later renamed the Ferrero Academy) in Villena, Alicante. He continued to work with Cascales as part of the coaching team of Juan Carlos Ferrero. López later coached players including Guillermo García Lopez, Santiago Ventura, and Mariusz Fyrstenberg. He accompanied the Spanish tennis team to both the 2000 and 2012 Olympic Games.

López began coaching Pablo Carreño Busta in November 2015, helping him capture seven ATP Tour singles titles and reach a career-high ranking of world No. 10. López parted ways with Carreño in December 2024, when it was announced he would be joining Carlos Alcaraz's coaching team to work alongside head coach Ferrero. He had previously stood in to coach Alcaraz at the 2024 Australian Open, while Ferrero recovered from knee surgery.

López and Ferrero split coaching duties between them in 2025, a season in which Alcaraz captured eight ATP Tour singles titles, including two majors and three Masters, and reclaimed the world No. 1 ranking. López and Ferrero jointly received the ATP Coach of the Year award. In December 2025, Ferrero and Alcaraz announced their separation. López remains part of Alcaraz's team, and is acting as head coach for the 2026 season.

Awards and achievements
Preceded by (United States) Michael Russell	ATP Coach of the Year; 2025 (with (Spain) Juan Carlos Ferrero)	Succeeded by Incumbent
