= 1989 Torneo Godó =

- Date: 18–24 September
- Edition: 37th
- Category: Super Series
- Draw: 56S / 28D
- Prize money: $375,000
- Surface: Clay / outdoor
- Location: Barcelona, Catalonia, Spain
- Venue: Real Club de Tenis Barcelona

Champions

Singles
- (Ecuador) Andrés Gómez

Doubles
- (Argentina) Gustavo Luza / (Argentina) Christian Miniussi
- Torneo Godó

The 1989 Torneo Godó was a men's professional tennis tournament that was played on outdoor clay courts at the Real Club de Tenis Barcelona in Barcelona, Catalonia, Spain that was part of the Championship Series of the 1989 Grand Prix circuit. It was the 37th edition of the tournament and took place from 18 September to 24 September 1989. Unseeded Andrés Gómez won the singles title.

This event also carried the joint denominations of the Campeonatos Internacionales de España or Spanish International Championships that was hosted at this venue and location, and was 22nd edition to be held in Barcelona, and the Trofeo Winston Super Series and was the 3rd edition branded under that name.

== Finals ==
=== Singles ===
(Ecuador) Andrés Gómez defeated (Austria) Horst Skoff 6–4, 6–4, 6–2

- It was Gómez' 2nd singles title of the year and the 17th of his career.

=== Doubles ===
(Argentina) Gustavo Luza / (Argentina) Christian Miniussi defeated (Spain) Sergio Casal / (Czechoslovakia) Tomáš Šmíd 6–3, 6–3
