= Víctor López Morón =

Spanish tennis player (born 1968)

- Country (sports): Spain
- Residence: Barcelona, Spain
- Born: 23 May 1968 (age 58) Barcelona, Spain
- Retired: Sep 1996 (last match played)
- Plays: Right-handed
- Prize money: $2,750

Singles
- Career record: 0–1
- Highest ranking: No. 502 (20 June 1994)

Grand Slam singles results
- Wimbledon: Q1 (1994)

Doubles
- Career record: 1–2
- Highest ranking: No. 303 (28 August 1995)

Víctor López Morón (Note: In this Spanish name, the first or paternal surname is López and the second or maternal family name is Morón.) (born 23 May 1968) is a tennis coach and a former professional player from Spain.

== Career ==
He made his only ATP singles main draw appearance as a wildcard at the 1988 Torneo Godó, where he was defeated in the first round by fellow Barcelona native Germán López.

After retiring from tennis, Victor coached his brother Álex López.

Victor López is currently coaching former top-10 player Pablo Carreño Busta at the TEC Carles Ferrer Salat in Barcelona, since the beginning of the 2025 season.
