= 1986 Torneo Godó =

Tennis tournament

- Date: 22–28 September 1986
- Edition: 34th
- Category: Grand Prix
- Draw: 64S / 32D
- Prize money: $220,000
- Surface: Clay / outdoor
- Location: Barcelona, Catalonia, Spain
- Venue: Real Club de Tenis Barcelona

Champions

Singles
- (Sweden) Kent Carlsson

Doubles
- (Sweden) Jan Gunnarsson / (Sweden) Joakim Nyström
- Torneo Godó

The 1986 Torneo Godó or Trofeo Conde de Godó was a men's tennis tournament that took place on outdoor clay courts at the Real Club de Tenis Barcelona in Barcelona, Catalonia in Spain. It was the 34th edition of the tournament and was part of the 1986 Grand Prix circuit. It was held from 22 September until 28 September 1986. Ninth-seeded Kent Carlsson won the singles title.

This event also carried the joint denomination of the Campeonatos Internacionales de España or Spanish International Championships that was hosted at this venue and location, and was 19th edition to be held in Barcelona.

== Finals ==
=== Singles ===
(Sweden) Kent Carlsson defeated (West Germany) Andreas Maurer 6–2, 6–2, 6–0

- It was Carlsson's 2nd singles title of the year and of his career.

=== Doubles ===
(Sweden) Jan Gunnarsson / (Sweden) Joakim Nyström defeated (Peru) Carlos di Laura / (Italy) Claudio Panatta 6–3, 6–4
