= 1988 Torneo Godó =

- Date: 12–18 September
- Edition: 36th
- Draw: 56S / 28D
- Prize money: $372,500
- Surface: Clay / outdoor
- Location: Barcelona, Catalonia, Spain
- Venue: Real Club de Tenis Barcelona

Champions

Singles
- (Sweden) Kent Carlsson

Doubles
- (Spain) Sergio Casal / (Spain) Emilio Sánchez
← 1987 ·	Torneo Godó	· 1989 →

The 1988 Torneo Godó was a men's professional tennis tournament that was played on outdoor clay courts at the Real Club de Tenis Barcelona in Barcelona, Catalonia, Spain that was part of the 1988 Grand Prix circuit. It was the 36th edition of the tournament and took place from 12 September to 18 September 1988. Second-seeded Kent Carlsson won his second singles title at the event after 1986.

This event also carried the joint denominations of the Campeonatos Internacionales de España or Spanish International Championships that was hosted at this venue and location, and was 21st edition to be held in Barcelona, and the Trofeo Winston Super Series and was the 2nd edition branded under that name.

== Finals ==
=== Singles ===
(Sweden) Kent Carlsson defeated (Austria) Thomas Muster 6–3, 6–3, 3–6, 6–1

- It was Carlsson's 5th singles title of the year and the 9th and last of his career.

=== Doubles ===
(Spain) Sergio Casal / (Spain) Emilio Sánchez defeated (Switzerland) Claudio Mezzadri / (Uruguay) Diego Pérez 6–4, 6–3
