= Kent Carlsson =

Swedish tennis player

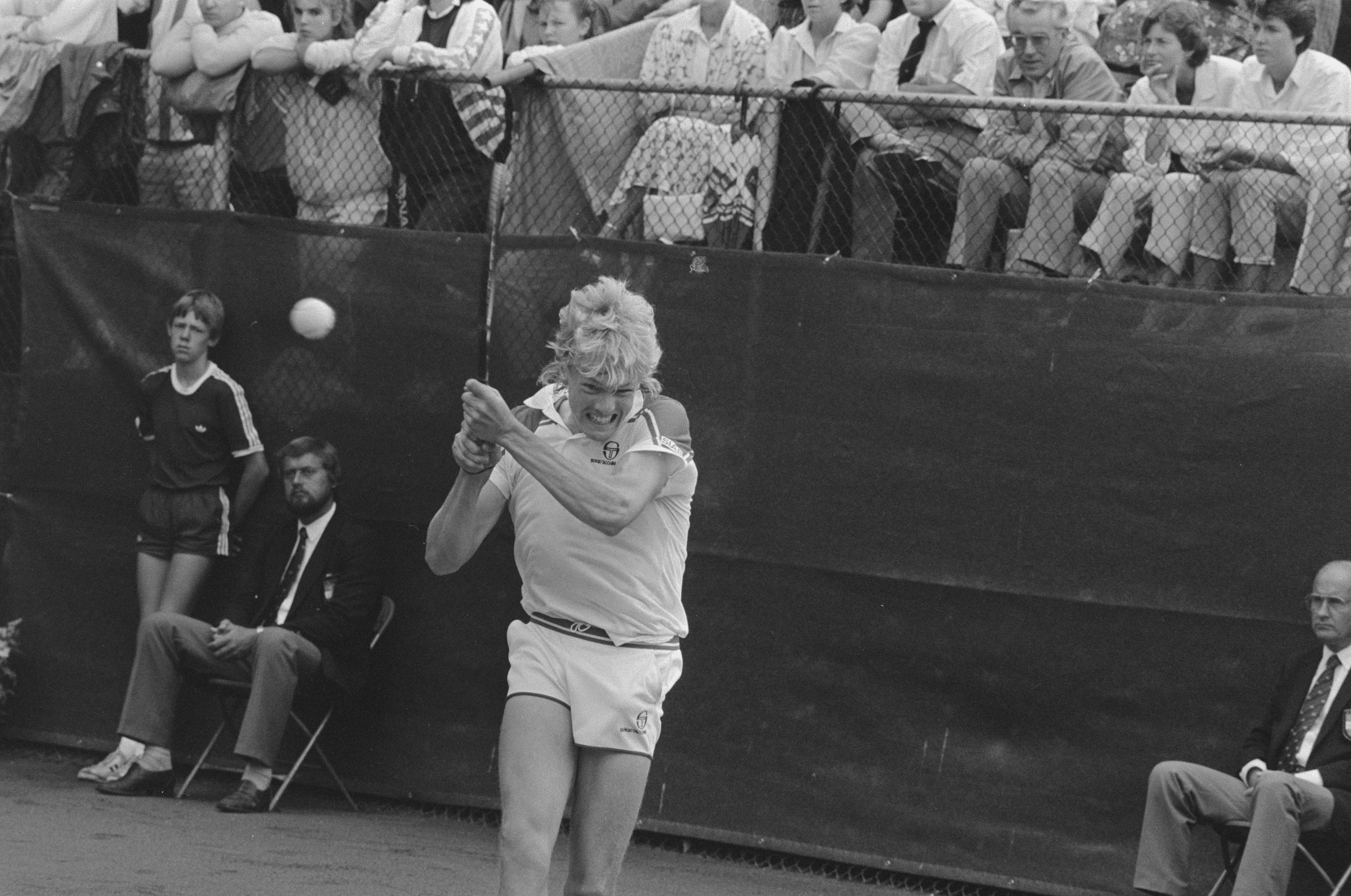
- Kent Carlsson during a July 1985 competition in Hilversum, Netherlands
- Country (sports): Sweden
- Residence: Eskilstuna, Sweden
- Born: 3 January 1968 (age 58) Eskilstuna, Sweden
- Height: 1.80 m (5 ft 11 in)
- Turned pro: 1983
- Retired: 1990
- Plays: Right-handed (two-handed backhand)
- Prize money: $998,956

Singles
- Career record: 160–54
- Career titles: 9
- Highest ranking: No. 6 (19 September 1988)

Grand Slam singles results
- French Open: 4R (1987, 1988)
- US Open: 1R (1986)

Doubles
- Career record: 2–9
- Career titles: 0
- Highest ranking: No. 383 (13 July 1987)

Grand Slam doubles results
- US Open: 2R (1986)

Kent Carlsson (born 3 January 1968) is a former tennis player from Sweden. A seasoned claycourter, he won all nine of his ATP tour singles titles on the surface, including the 1988 Hamburg Masters. Carlsson achieved a career-high singles ranking of World No. 6 in September 1988.

== Early life ==
When he was young, his family used to spend their summers in Båstad. The family always parked their caravan at Hemmeslöv's campsite early in the summer, which is where Kent started to play tennis at the age of four.

As a result of Björn Borg's huge success at the top level, everyone in Carlsson's neighborhood wanted to play tennis. They played a lot in the streets, improvising nets with bikes. However, because they had to be eight years old to enter the tennis school at TK Hobby, Carlsson began playing table tennis, handball, football, and bandy. He got an exemption in the summer of 1975, and was thus able to play on the outdoor courts of the tennis school at the age of seven. Due to the huge turnout of tennis enthusiasts during the Borg era, it was almost impossible to book a court at the tennis club, so he played a lot against a plank.

At the TK Hobby club, he had coaches such as Roger Nilsson and Bosse Karlsson, in addition to his father, Lars-Göran Carlsson, who coached Kent throughout his junior years. Carlsson was critical of the media who said that his father Lars-Göran pushed him too hard and in response to the criticism, he said "it was wrong and on the contrary, he put the breaks [sic] on. I believed I was at my best, when I trained a lot and was never going to lose because of conditioning. I lost because my opponent was better on the day".

== Playing career ==
=== Juniors ===
Carlsson was a successful junior winning the Kalle Anka Cup, which is a Swedish junior tournament held in Båstad, for four consecutive seasons, 1979, 1980, 1981 and 1982, once in the under 11 category, twice in the under 13s and once in the under 15. The day before the final of the 1980 qualifying competition, held in Sörmland, he and his younger brother Thomas were cycling around the neighborhood when his brother's pedal ended up in his wheel, which resulted in a harsh fall, but he still managed to win the final the next day, despite being really bruised. He still holds the record for the most overall titles wins at 4, one more than Thomas Enqvist and Thomas Johansson who both won it 3 times.

Carlsson did not compete for a fifth title in Båstad but instead elected to participate in the 1983 European Championship for U16 players. When asked about this decision, Carlsson stated: "I was only 15 years old and was going to represent my country, so the choice was not that difficult". Carlsson was a three-time European Champion between 1981 and 1983, winning the U14 tournament twice, a feat that remains unmatched, and winning the U16 event once, beating Bruno Orešar in the final. Carlsson was dominant in his age group and did not lose a single match against an opponent of the same age until right at the end of his career.

His successes at Båstad were of great importance to Carlsson since they encouraged him to pursue a tennis career despite not being "born with an athletic body". For instance, Carlsson was diagnosed with "grasshopper knee bowl" in 1983, by Dr Jan Ekstrand, who had previously worked with, among other groups, the Sweden national team. Ekstrand stated: "I believe you can do very well down the road, but do not count on a long career. You will have to wrestle with these problems considering how you are made". However, Carlsson was "stubborn, so instead of feeling sorry for myself, I found solutions". A routine of physical training built up the musculature around the kneecaps. He was critical of his contemporary players whom he thought too spoilt concerning medical conditions.

Carlsson believed that with his medical issues his only chance to reach the top level would be to take shortcuts and play at a quicker pace. In the 1983 Orange Bowl, Carlsson competed in the 18-year-old category despite being 15 years old. Up against the best in the world despite the age difference, Carlsson won the tournament, beating Emilio Sánchez in the final. In the following season, he won the Roland Garros Boys' Singles title in 1984 without losing a set, defeating Mark Kratzmann in the final.

=== Pro tour ===
Carlsson played his first professional match in 1983 losing to Heinz Günthardt in Geneva. 1984 was his first full year on tour and made the 3rd round of Roland Garros losing to Andrés Gómez, who would defeat him in the 1985 and 1986 Roland Garros events. Carlsson won his first challenger title without losing a set in Neu-Ulm defeating Raúl Viver.

After losing to Mats Wilander at Barcelona of October 1984, Carlsson did not play his first tournament until April 1985 in Bari, where he lost to Emilio Sánchez. Playing a mixture of ATP events and challengers, Carlsson made his first ATP tour final in Hilversum losing to Ricki Osterthun in 5 sets after having a 2 sets to 0 lead; he won his second challenger in Messina defeating Ronald Agénor.

Starting the 1986 season in April, Carlsson won his first title on the ATP in Bari by defeating Horacio de la Peña. He made two finals in Madrid, losing to Joakim Nyström and at Bordeaux, losing to Paolo Canè. Carlsson made his one and only appearance at the US Open losing to Pavel Složil in three sets, after that he won his second career title in Barcelona and made his Davis Cup debut against Czechoslovakia defeating Miloslav Mečíř in straight sets, reversing his defeat by Mečíř in the semi-finals of Hamburg.

In 1987 Carlsson retired against Mečíř at Indian Wells with a knee injury which plagued his career and restricted him to playing mostly on clay and only 13 career matches on hardcourts. He came back and won two titles, both against Emilio Sánchez in the final, at Nice and Bologna. With the title in Bologna Carlsson only dropped 10 games for the tournament, 5 of which were in the first match. That is the record for the fewest games dropped to win an International Series tournament Carlsson said that this was his best tournament of his career. In addition to the two titles, Carlsson made two finals at Boston and Indianapolis which was played on green clay losing to countryman Mats Wilander both times. Carlsson won both his singles matches for Sweden against France in the Davis Cup quarter finals at Fréjus defeating Thierry Tulasne and Henri Leconte. Carlsson had another surgery in August after withdrawing from the event at St. Vincent.

1988 was Carlsson's best year coming back from knee surgery in April he won his first title of the year in Madrid over Fernando Luna without losing a set. He won the German Open without losing a set defeating Henri Leconte in the final making use of his heavy topspin off both sides, especially the forehand side. He followed that up with a semi final performance at the Rome Masters losing to Ivan Lendl. Carlsson lost to Jonas Svensson in five sets at Roland Garros in the fourth round. Carlsson won three more titles after Wimbledon, at Kitzbühel defeating Emilio Sánchez, St. Vincent defeating Thierry Champion and his last career title at Barcelona defeating Thomas Muster. In Davis Cup Carlsson defeated Thierry Tulasne in a dead rubber at Båstad, he was also a finalist at Geneva losing to Marián Vajda and at Palermo losing to Mats Wilander.

After his successful 1988 season, Carlsson had more problems with his knees, but was able to make the final at Athens losing to Ronald Agénor and played his last professional match at Kitzbühel losing to Christian Saceanu. After another knee operation Carlsson announced his retirement in May 1990.

== After tennis ==
After retirement from the professional tour, Carlsson trained Magnus Norman, Thomas Johansson, Nicklas Kroon, and Aki Rahunen. After living in Monaco, Carlsson moved back to Sweden and became a horse trainer for trotting races. He developed the interest as a teenager and it was natural for him to take this as a new career and said "there is a great deal of satisfaction from training a horse from the beginning".

== Career finals ==
=== Singles: 17 (9 titles – 8 runners-up) ===
Legend (singles)
Grand Slam (0–0)
Tennis Masters Cup (0–0)
ATP Masters Series (1–0)
ATP Championship Series (3–0)
ATP Tour (5–8)

Result	W-L	Date	Tournament	Surface	Opponent	Score
Loss	0–1	Jul 1985	Hilversum, Netherlands	Clay	(West Germany) Ricki Osterthun	6–4, 6–4, 2–6, 4–6, 3–6
Win	1–1	Apr 1986	Bari, Italy	Clay	(Argentina) Horacio de la Peña	7–5, 6–7, 7–5
Loss	1–2	Apr 1986	Madrid, Spain	Clay	(Sweden) Joakim Nyström	1–6, 1–6
Loss	1–3	Jul 1986	Bordeaux, France	Clay	(Italy) Paolo Canè	4–6, 6–1, 5–7
Win	2–3	Sep 1986	Barcelona, Spain	Clay	(West Germany) Andreas Maurer	6–2, 6–2, 6–0
Win	3–3	Apr 1987	Nice, France	Clay	(Spain) Emilio Sánchez	7–6^{(9–7)}, 6–3
Win	4–3	Jun 1987	Bologna, Italy	Clay	(Spain) Emilio Sánchez	6–2, 6–1
Loss	4–4	Jul 1987	Boston, U.S.	Clay	(Sweden) Mats Wilander	6–7^{(5–7)}, 1–6
Loss	4–5	Jul 1987	Indianapolis, U.S.	Clay	(Sweden) Mats Wilander	5–7, 3–6
Win	5–5	Apr 1988	Madrid, Spain	Clay	(Spain) Fernando Luna	6–2, 6–1
Win	6–5	Apr 1988	Hamburg, Germany	Clay	(France) Henri Leconte	6–2, 6–1, 6–4
Win	7–5	Aug 1988	Kitzbühel, Austria	Clay	(Spain) Emilio Sánchez	6–1, 6–1, 4–6, 4–6, 6–3
Win	8–5	Aug 1988	Saint-Vincent, Italy	Clay	(France) Thierry Champion	6–0, 6–2
Win	9–5	Sep 1988	Barcelona, Spain	Clay	(Austria) Thomas Muster	6–3, 6–3, 3–6, 6–1
Loss	9–6	Sep 1988	Geneva, Switzerland	Clay	(Czechoslovakia) Marián Vajda	4–6, 4–6
Loss	9–7	Sep 1988	Palermo, Italy	Clay	(Sweden) Mats Wilander	1–6, 6–3, 4–6
Loss	9–8	Apr 1989	Athens, Greece	Clay	(Haiti) Ronald Agénor	3–6, 4–6
