= 2019 Geneva Open – Singles =

Singles
- 2019 Geneva Open

Final
- Champion: (Germany) Alexander Zverev
- Runner-up: (Chile) Nicolás Jarry
- Score: 6–3, 3–6, 7–6^{(10–8)}

Details
- Draw: 28 (4 Q / 3 WC )
- Seeds: 8

Events
Singles	Doubles
← 2018 ·	Geneva Open	· 2021 →

Alexander Zverev defeated Nicolás Jarry in the final, 6–3, 3–6, 7–6^{(10–8)} to win the singles tennis title at the 2019 Geneva Open. Zverev saved two championship points en route to the title, in the final-set tiebreak.

Márton Fucsovics was the defending champion, but lost in the second round to Federico Delbonis.

== Seeds ==
The top four seeds receive a bye into the second round.

1. (Germany) Alexander Zverev (champion)
2. (Switzerland) Stan Wawrinka (second round)
3. (Chile) Cristian Garín (second round)
4. (Hungary) Márton Fucsovics (second round)
5. (Moldova) Radu Albot (semifinals)
6. (France) Adrian Mannarino (first round)
7. (Australia) Matthew Ebden (first round)
8. (Italy) Andreas Seppi (first round)

== Draw ==
=== Key ===
- Q = Qualifier
- WC = Wild card
- LL = Lucky loser
- Alt = Alternate
- SE = Special exempt
- PR = Protected ranking
- ITF = ITF entry
- JE = Junior exempt
- w/o = Walkover
- r = Retired
- d = Defaulted
- SR = Special ranking

=== Finals ===
Semifinals
1	(Germany) Alexander Zverev	7	6^{6}	6
(Argentina) Federico Delbonis	5	7^{8}	3
(Chile) Nicolás Jarry	6	6
5	(Moldova) Radu Albot	3	4

Final
1	(Germany) Alexander Zverev	6	3	7^{10}
(Chile) Nicolás Jarry	3	6	6^{8}

=== Top half ===
First round
(Latvia) E Gulbis	6	7^{9}
(Japan) Y Nishioka	2	6^{7}
(Germany) P Gojowczyk	5	5
WC	(Serbia) J Tipsarević	7	7
(Bolivia) H Dellien	6	3	6
8	(Italy) A Seppi	1	6	4
Q	(Bulgaria) G Dimitrov	6	4	2
(Argentina) F Delbonis	1	6	6
(Portugal) J Sousa	6	6^{6}	6
(Argentina) L Mayer	2	7^{8}	4
(Spain) A Ramos Viñolas	6^{2}	6	6
6	(France) A Mannarino	7^{7}	3	2

Second round
1	(Germany) A Zverev	6	6
(Latvia) E Gulbis	2	1
WC	(Serbia) J Tipsarević	6^{3}	3
(Bolivia) H Dellien	7^{7}	6
4	(Hungary) M Fucsovics	4	2
(Argentina) F Delbonis	6	6
(Portugal) J Sousa	0	3
(Spain) A Ramos Viñolas	6	6

Quarterfinals
1	(Germany) A Zverev	7	3	6
(Bolivia) H Dellien	5	6	3
(Argentina) F Delbonis	7^{7}	7
(Spain) A Ramos Viñolas	6^{5}	5

Semifinals
1	(Germany) A Zverev	7	6^{6}	6
(Argentina) F Delbonis	5	7^{8}	3

=== Bottom half ===
First round
7	(Australia) M Ebden	2	6^{4}
(Chile) N Jarry	6	7^{7}
(United States) D Kudla	5	6	6
(Australia) J Thompson	7	2	4
Q	(Spain) B Zapata Miralles	4	6	3
(Japan) T Daniel	6	4	6
5	(Moldova) R Albot	7^{8}	7^{7}
Q	(Italy) L Sonego	6^{6}	6^{3}
(Germany) M Zverev	4	4
(Argentina) JI Londero	6	6
WC	(Spain) F López	7^{7}	4	5
Q	(Bosnia and Herzegovina) D Džumhur	6^{2}	6	7

Second round
(Chile) N Jarry	6	6
(United States) D Kudla	3	3
(Japan) T Daniel	6	4	6
3	(Chile) C Garín	2	6	4
5	(Moldova) R Albot	6	6^{3}	6
(Argentina) JI Londero	1	7^{7}	4
Q	(Bosnia and Herzegovina) D Džumhur	3	6	6
2/WC	(Switzerland) S Wawrinka	6	3	4

Quarterfinals
(Chile) N Jarry	6	7
(Japan) T Daniel	1	5
5	(Moldova) R Albot	6	7
Q	(Bosnia and Herzegovina) D Džumhur	3	5

Semifinals
(Chile) N Jarry	6	6
5	(Moldova) R Albot	3	4

== Qualifying ==
=== Seeds ===
1. (Bulgaria) Grigor Dimitrov (qualified)
2. (Bosnia and Herzegovina) Damir Džumhur (qualified)
3. (Italy) Lorenzo Sonego (qualified)
4. (Lithuania) Ričardas Berankis (first round)
5. (Serbia) Miomir Kecmanović (qualifying competition)
6. (United States) Bradley Klahn (first round)
7. (Italy) Thomas Fabbiano (qualifying competition)
8. (United States) Tommy Paul (qualifying competition)

=== Qualifiers ===
1. (Bulgaria) Grigor Dimitrov
2. (Bosnia and Herzegovina) Damir Džumhur
3. (Italy) Lorenzo Sonego
4. (Spain) Bernabé Zapata Miralles

=== Qualifying draw ===
==== First qualifier ====
First round
1/WC	(Bulgaria) Grigor Dimitrov	6	6
(Switzerland) Marc-Andrea Hüsler	4	3
WC	(Serbia) Marko Miladinović	2	4
7	(Italy) Thomas Fabbiano	6	6

Qualifying competition
1/WC	(Bulgaria) Grigor Dimitrov	7	6
7	(Italy) Thomas Fabbiano	5	3

==== Second qualifier ====
First round
2	(Bosnia and Herzegovina) Damir Džumhur	6	6
(United States) JC Aragone	3	4
(France) Stéphane Robert	4	5
8	(United States) Tommy Paul	6	7

Qualifying competition
2	(Bosnia and Herzegovina) Damir Džumhur	6	4	6
8	(United States) Tommy Paul	2	6	3

==== Third qualifier ====
First round
3	(Italy) Lorenzo Sonego	4	6	6
(Germany) Daniel Masur	6	2	3
Alt	(United States) Ulises Blanch	6	1	4
5	(Serbia) Miomir Kecmanović	4	6	6

Qualifying competition
3	(Italy) Lorenzo Sonego	6	7^{7}
5	(Serbia) Miomir Kecmanović	4	6^{5}

==== Fourth qualifier ====
First round
4	(Lithuania) Ričardas Berankis	4	4
(Japan) Kaichi Uchida	6	6
(Spain) Bernabé Zapata Miralles	5	6	6
6	(United States) Bradley Klahn	7	4	2

Qualifying competition
(Japan) Kaichi Uchida	1	1
(Spain) Bernabé Zapata Miralles	6	6
