= 1984 Geneva Open =

- Date: 17–23 September
- Edition: 5th
- Category: Grand Prix
- Draw: 32S / 16D
- Prize money: $100,000
- Surface: Clay / outdoor
- Location: Geneva, Switzerland

Champions

Singles
- (United States) Aaron Krickstein

Doubles
- (Denmark) Michael Mortensen / (Sweden) Mats Wilander
- Geneva Open

The 1984 Geneva Open was a men's tennis tournament played on clay courts that was part of the 1984 Volvo Grand Prix. It was played at Geneva in Switzerland from 17 September through 23 September 1984. Fifth-seeded Aaron Krickstein won the singles title. The doubles final could not be played due to rain. It was rescheduled to the first day of the 1984 Stockholm Open tournament in late October and was played on the indoor hard courts of the Kungliga tennishallen.

== Finals ==
=== Singles ===
(United States) Aaron Krickstein defeated (Sweden) Henrik Sundström 6–7, 6–1, 6–4

- It was Krickstein's 3rd singles title of the year and the 4th of his career.

=== Doubles ===
(Denmark) Michael Mortensen / (Sweden) Mats Wilander defeated (Czechoslovakia) Libor Pimek / (Czechoslovakia) Tomáš Šmíd 6–1, 3–6, 7–5

- It was Mortensen's 4th title of the year and the 4th of his career. It was Wilander's 3rd title of the year and the 16th of his career.
