= 1984 Geneva Open – Singles =

Singles
- 1984 Geneva Open

Final
- Champion: (United States) Aaron Krickstein
- Runner-up: (Sweden) Henrik Sundström
- Score: 6–7, 6–1, 6–4

Details
- Draw: 32
- Seeds: 8

Events
Singles	Doubles
- Geneva Open

Mats Wilander was the defending champion but lost in the quarterfinals this year.

Aaron Krickstein won the title, defeating Henrik Sundström 6–7, 6–1, 6–4 in the final.

== Seeds ==
1. (Sweden) Mats Wilander (quarterfinals)
2. (Sweden) Henrik Sundström (final)
3. (Spain) Juan Aguilera (quarterfinals)
4. (Czechoslovakia) Tomáš Šmíd (quarterfinals)
5. (United States) Aaron Krickstein (champion)
6. (Czechoslovakia) Libor Pimek (semifinals)
7. (Hungary) Zoltán Kuhárszky (first round)
8. (Spain) Emilio Sánchez (first round)

== Draw ==
Key

- Q = Qualifier
- WC = Wild card
- LL = Lucky loser
- Alt = Alternate
- ITF = ITF entry
- PR = Protected ranking
- SR = Special ranking
- SE = Special exempt
- JE = Junior exempt
- JR = Junior Accelerator Programme entrant
- CO = College Accelerator Programme entrant
- NG = Next Gen Accelerator Program entrant
- w/o = Walkover
- r = Retired
- d = Defaulted

=== Finals ===
Semifinals
5	(United States) Aaron Krickstein	6	6	6
(Argentina) Alejandro Ganzábal	7	0	2
6	(Czechoslovakia) Libor Pimek	3	4
2	(Sweden) Henrik Sundström	6	6

Final
5	(United States) Aaron Krickstein	6	6	6
2	(Sweden) Henrik Sundström	7	1	4

=== Top half ===
First round
1	(Sweden) M Wilander	6	6
WC	(Switzerland) R Stadler	2	1
(Spain) J Avendaño	2	7	3
(Argentina) M Jaite	6	6	6
Q	(Argentina) E Bengoechea	6	3	6
Q	(Sweden) P Hjertquist	4	6	3
(South Africa) D Tarr	4	2
5	(United States) A Krickstein	6	6
4	(Czechoslovakia) T Šmíd	6	7
Q	(Spain) J Bardou	2	6
(West Germany) P Elter	6	3	6
(Australia) P Doohan	3	6	1
(Argentina) A Ganzábal	1	7	6
(Ecuador) R Viver	6	6	2
(Italy) S Colombo	6	6
8	(Spain) E Sánchez	3	3

Second round
1	(Sweden) M Wilander	5	6	6
(Argentina) M Jaite	7	4	2
Q	(Argentina) E Bengoechea	3	4
5	(United States) A Krickstein	6	6
4	(Czechoslovakia) T Šmíd	6	6
(West Germany) P Elter	3	3
(Argentina) A Ganzábal	6	6	7
(Italy) S Colombo	7	1	5

Quarterfinals
1	(Sweden) M Wilander	3	7	4
5	(United States) A Krickstein	6	6	6
4	(Czechoslovakia) T Šmíd	7	2	6
(Argentina) A Ganzábal	6	6	7

Semifinals
5	(United States) A Krickstein	6	6	6
(Argentina) A Ganzábal	7	0	2

=== Bottom half ===
First round
6	(Czechoslovakia) L Pimek	2	6	6
(Sweden) K Carlsson	6	2	3
Q	(Czechoslovakia) J Čihák	7	7
(Chile) J Fillol	6	6
(Sweden) J Carlsson	5	1
WC	(Switzerland) Christoph Meyer	7	6
(Italy) C Panatta	4	0
3	(Spain) J Aguilera	6	6
7	(Hungary) Z Kuhárszky	3	6
(West Germany) D Keretić	6	7
(Socialist Federal Republic of Yugoslavia) M Ostoja	5	4
(Spain) G Urpí	7	6
(Spain) A Tous	7	7
(Argentina) G Rivas	6	6
WC	(Romania) I Năstase	2	6
2	(Sweden) H Sundström	6	7

Second round
6	(Czechoslovakia) L Pimek	6	6
Q	(Czechoslovakia) J Čihák	0	4
WC	(Switzerland) C Meyer	2	2
3	(Spain) J Aguilera	6	6
(West Germany) D Keretić	6	6
(Spain) G Urpí	3	4
(Spain) A Tous	3	3
2	(Sweden) H Sundström	6	6

Quarterfinals
6	(Czechoslovakia) L Pimek	6	7
3	(Spain) J Aguilera	1	6
(West Germany) D Keretić	3	4
2	(Sweden) H Sundström	6	6

Semifinals
6	(Czechoslovakia) L Pimek	3	4
2	(Sweden) H Sundström	6	6
