= 1980 Geneva Open – Singles =

Singles
- 1980 Geneva Open

Final
- Champion: (Hungary) Balázs Taróczy
- Runner-up: (Italy) Adriano Panatta
- Score: 6–3, 6–2

Details
- Draw: 32
- Seeds: 8

Events
Singles	Doubles
Geneva Open	· 1981 →

This was the first edition of the event.

Balázs Taróczy won the title, defeating Adriano Panatta 6–3, 6–2 in the final.

== Seeds ==
1. (United States) Harold Solomon (quarterfinals)
2. (United States) Vitas Gerulaitis (quarterfinals)
3. (Hungary) Balázs Taróczy (champion)
4. (Switzerland) Heinz Günthardt (quarterfinals)
5. (Italy) Adriano Panatta (semifinals)
6. (Socialist Federal Republic of Yugoslavia) Željko Franulović (quarterfinals)
7. (United Kingdom) Mark Cox (first round)
8. (West Germany) Peter Elter (first round)

== Draw ==
=== Key ===
- Q = Qualifier
- WC = Wild card
- LL = Lucky loser
- Alt = Alternate
- SE = Special exempt
- PR = Protected ranking
- ITF = ITF entry
- JE = Junior exempt
- w/o = Walkover
- r = Retired
- d = Defaulted
- SR = Special ranking

=== Finals ===
Semifinals
(West Germany) Wolfgang Popp	0	1
3	(Hungary) Balázs Taróczy	6	6
Q	(Switzerland) Roland Stadler	4	1
5	(Italy) Adriano Panatta	6	6

Final
3	(Hungary) Balázs Taróczy	6	6
5	(Italy) Adriano Panatta	3	2

=== Top half ===
First round
1	(United States) H Solomon	7	6
(West Germany) U Pinner	6	2
(Sweden) K Johansson	2	6	11
(Spain) Á Giménez	6	3	9
Q	(France) C Casa	3	6	6
(Austria) H Kary	6	3	4
(West Germany) W Popp	7	6
7	(United Kingdom) M Cox	6	4
3	(Hungary) B Taróczy	6	6
(United States) M Grant	2	0
(Australia) J James	6	6
(Australia) G Whitecross	3	2
(Colombia) Á Betancur	7	6
Q	(Italy) F Fanucci	5	2
(Switzerland) I Dupasquier	3	1
6	(Socialist Federal Republic of Yugoslavia) Ž Franulović	6	6

Second round
1	(United States) H Solomon	6	3	7
(Sweden) K Johansson	3	6	5
Q	(France) C Casa	6	4	1
(West Germany) W Popp	2	6	6
3	(Hungary) B Taróczy	6	6
(Australia) J James	2	2
(Colombia) Á Betancur	3	3
6	(Socialist Federal Republic of Yugoslavia) Ž Franulović	6	6

Quarterfinals
1	(United States) H Solomon	5	5
(West Germany) W Popp	7	7
3	(Hungary) B Taróczy	6	6
6	(Socialist Federal Republic of Yugoslavia) Ž Franulović	2	4

Semifinals
(West Germany) W Popp	0	1
3	(Hungary) B Taróczy	6	6

=== Bottom half ===
First round
8	(West Germany) P Elter	6	3	4
(Italy) P Bertolucci	1	6	6
Q	(Switzerland) R Stadler	6	6
(Hungary) Z Kuhárszky	1	3
(Switzerland) Edgar Schurmann	6	6	6
(South Africa) D Joubert	7	2	1
(Colombia) A Cortes	6	3	5
4	(Switzerland) H Günthardt	3	6	7
5	(Italy) A Panatta	5	6	6
(New Zealand) O Parun	7	1	4
(United States) R Fagel	1	6	6
(France) Gregoire Rafaitin	6	1	1
(Czechoslovakia) S Birner	6	7
(Colombia) J Velasco Sr.	2	5
(Switzerland) M Günthardt	0	1
2	(United States) Gerulaitis	6	6

Second round
(Italy) P Bertolucci	2	3
Q	(Switzerland) R Stadler	6	6
(Switzerland) E Schurmann	6	5
4	(Switzerland) H Günthardt	7	7
5	(Italy) A Panatta	7	6
(United States) R Fagel	5	3
(Czechoslovakia) S Birner	4	3
2	(United States) Gerulaitis	6	6

Quarterfinals
Q	(Switzerland) R Stadler	7	4	6
4	(Switzerland) H Günthardt	6	6	1
5	(Italy) A Panatta	3	6	6
2	(United States) Gerulaitis	6	1	2

Semifinals
Q	(Switzerland) R Stadler	4	1
5	(Italy) A Panatta	6	6
