= 1984 Geneva Open – Doubles =

Doubles
- 1984 Geneva Open

Final
- Champions: (Denmark) Michael Mortensen (Sweden) Mats Wilander
- Runners-up: (Czechoslovakia) Libor Pimek (Czechoslovakia) Tomáš Šmíd
- Score: 6–1, 3–6, 7–5

Events
Singles	Doubles
← 1983 ·	Geneva Open	· 1985 →

Stanislav Birner and Blaine Willenborg were the defending champions, but did not participate this year.

Michael Mortensen and Mats Wilander won the title, defeating Libor Pimek and Tomáš Šmíd 6–1, 3–6, 7–5 in the final. The doubles final could not be played due to rain. It was rescheduled to the first day of the 1984 Stockholm Open tournament in late October and was played on the indoor hard courts of the Kungliga tennishallen.

== Seeds ==
1. (Czechoslovakia) Libor Pimek / (Czechoslovakia) Tomáš Šmíd (final)
2. (Denmark) Michael Mortensen / (Sweden) Mats Wilander (champions)
3. (Switzerland) Markus Günthardt / (Hungary) Zoltan Kuharszky (first round)
4. (Australia) Peter Doohan / (South Africa) Brian Levine (semifinals)

== Draw ==
=== Key ===
- Q = Qualifier
- WC = Wild card
- LL = Lucky loser
- Alt = Alternate
- SE = Special exempt
- PR = Protected ranking
- ITF = ITF entry
- JE = Junior exempt
- w/o = Walkover
- r = Retired
- d = Defaulted
- SR = Special ranking

=== Draw ===
First round
1	(Belgium) L Pimek (Czechoslovakia) T Šmíd	6	7
(Romania) I Năstase (Socialist Federal Republic of Yugoslavia) M Ostoja	3	6
(United States) B Nealon (Sweden) S Svensson	6	1	6
(Italy) S Colombo (Spain) F Soler	3	6	3
4	(Australia) P Doohan (South Africa) B Levine	6	2	6
(Spain) E Sánchez (United States) Curt Stadler	3	6	3
(Argentina) M Jaite (Spain) A Tous	6	6
(Spain) J Avendaño (Spain) G Urpí	3	1
(Denmark) P Bastiansen (Sweden) R Båthman	6	7
(Italy) G Ocleppo (Argentina) G Vilas	3	5
(Italy) C Panatta (Sweden) H Sundström	6	6	6
3	(Switzerland) M Günthardt (Hungary) Z Kuharszky	7	4	4
(Sweden) J Carlsson (Czechoslovakia) J Čihák	3	7	3
(Sweden) P Hjertquist (South Africa) D Tarr	6	6	6
(West Germany) P Elter (Sweden) J Windahl	0	3
2	(Denmark) M Mortensen (Sweden) M Wilander	6	6

Quarterfinals
1	(Belgium) L Pimek (Czechoslovakia) T Šmíd	6	6
(United States) B Nealon (Sweden) S Svensson	4	1
4	(Australia) P Doohan (South Africa) B Levine	7	6
(Argentina) M Jaite (Spain) A Tous	6	4
(Denmark) P Bastiansen (Sweden) R Båthman	6	6
(Italy) C Panatta (Sweden) H Sundström	4	3
(Sweden) P Hjertquist (South Africa) D Tarr	3	6	2
2	(Denmark) M Mortensen (Sweden) M Wilander	6	3	6

Semifinals
1	(Belgium) L Pimek (Czechoslovakia) T Šmíd	3	6	6
4	(Australia) P Doohan (South Africa) B Levine	6	3	1
(Denmark) P Bastiansen (Sweden) R Båthman	3	3
2	(Denmark) M Mortensen (Sweden) M Wilander	6	6

Final
1	(Belgium) L Pimek (Czechoslovakia) T Šmíd	1	6	5
2	(Denmark) M Mortensen (Sweden) M Wilander	6	3	7
