= 1980 Geneva Open – Doubles =

Doubles
- 1980 Geneva Open

Final
- Champions: (Socialist Federal Republic of Yugoslavia) Željko Franulović (Hungary) Balázs Taróczy
- Runners-up: (Switzerland) Heinz Günthardt (Switzerland) Markus Günthardt
- Score: 6–4, 4–6, 6–4

Details
- Draw: 16
- Seeds: 4

Events
| Singles | Doubles |
- Geneva Open

This was the first edition of the event.

Željko Franulović and Balázs Taróczy won the title, defeating Heinz Günthardt and Markus Günthardt 6–4, 4–6, 6–4 in the final.

== Seeds ==
1. (Italy) Paolo Bertolucci / (Italy) Adriano Panatta (first round)
2. (Switzerland) Heinz Günthardt / (Switzerland) Markus Günthardt (final)
3. (Spain) Ángel Giménez / (Colombia) Jairo Velasco Sr. (quarterfinals)
4. (Socialist Federal Republic of Yugoslavia) Željko Franulović / (Hungary) Balázs Taróczy (champions)

== Draw ==
Key

- Q = Qualifier
- WC = Wild card
- LL = Lucky loser
- Alt = Alternate
- ITF = ITF entry
- PR = Protected ranking
- SR = Special ranking
- SE = Special exempt
- JE = Junior exempt
- JR = Junior Accelerator Programme entrant
- CO = College Accelerator Programme entrant
- NG = Next Gen Accelerator Program entrant
- w/o = Walkover
- r = Retired
- d = Defaulted

=== Draw ===
First round
1 | (Italy) P Bertolucci (Italy) A Panatta | 6 | 7 | 4
(Australia) J James (New Zealand) O Parun | 7 | 6 | 6
(Czechoslovakia) S Birner (United States) M Grant | 6 | 6
(Switzerland) I Dupasquier (Switzerland) Michel Robadin | 3 | 3
4 | (Socialist Federal Republic of Yugoslavia) Ž Franulović (Hungary) B Taróczy | 7 | 7
(West Germany) P Elter (United States) R Fagel | 5 | 5
(Sweden) K Johansson (West Germany) W Popp | 6 | 7
(France) C Casa (France) Gregoire Rafaitin | 3 | 5
(Switzerland) Edgar Schurmann (Switzerland) R Stadler | 2 | 6 | 6
(Austria) H Kary (Czechoslovakia) J Průcha | 6 | 2 | 3
3 | (Spain) Á Giménez (Colombia) J Velasco Sr. | 6 | 6
(Colombia) Á Betancur (South Africa) D Joubert | 1 | 1
(Italy) F Fanucci (Italy) P Parrini | 6 | 6
(Canada) W Cowan (Canada) M Wostenholme | 1 | 2
(Colombia) A Cortes (Hungary) Z Kuharszky | 6 | 2
2 | (Switzerland) H Günthardt (Switzerland) M Günthardt | 7 | 6

Quarterfinals
(Australia) J James (New Zealand) O Parun | 6 | 7
(Czechoslovakia) S Birner (United States) M Grant | 2 | 5
4 | (Socialist Federal Republic of Yugoslavia) Ž Franulović (Hungary) B Taróczy | 6 | 6
(Sweden) K Johansson (West Germany) W Popp | 2 | 4
(Switzerland) E Schurmann (Switzerland) R Stadler | 6 | 6
3 | (Spain) Á Giménez (Colombia) J Velasco Sr. | 4 | 4
(Italy) F Fanucci (Italy) P Parrini | 3 | 4
2 | (Switzerland) H Günthardt (Switzerland) M Günthardt | 6 | 6

Semifinals
(Australia) J James (New Zealand) O Parun | 4 | 6
4 | (Socialist Federal Republic of Yugoslavia) Ž Franulović (Hungary) B Taróczy | 6 | 7
(Switzerland) E Schurmann (Switzerland) R Stadler | 5 | 3
2 | (Switzerland) H Günthardt (Switzerland) M Günthardt | 7 | 6

Final
4 | (Socialist Federal Republic of Yugoslavia) Ž Franulović (Hungary) B Taróczy | 6 | 4 | 6
2 | (Switzerland) H Günthardt (Switzerland) M Günthardt | 4 | 6 | 4
