= 2019 Geneva Open =

- Date: 19–25 May
- Edition: 17th
- Category: ATP Tour 250
- Draw: 28S / 16D
- Prize money: €501,345
- Surface: Clay
- Location: Geneva, Switzerland
- Venue: Tennis Club de Genève

Champions

Singles
- (Germany) Alexander Zverev

Doubles
- (Austria) Oliver Marach / (Croatia) Mate Pavić
← 2018 ·	Geneva Open	· 2021 →

The 2019 Geneva Open (sponsored by Banque Eric Sturdza) was a men's tennis tournament played on outdoor clay courts. It was the 17th edition of the Geneva Open and part of the ATP Tour 250 series of the 2019 ATP Tour. It took place at the Tennis Club de Genève in Geneva, Switzerland, from May 19 through May 25, 2019.

== Singles main-draw entrants ==
=== Seeds ===
Country	Player	Rank^{1}	Seed
GER	Alexander Zverev	5	1
SUI	Stan Wawrinka	29	2
CHI	Cristian Garín	35	3
HUN	Márton Fucsovics	37	4
MDA	Radu Albot	44	5
FRA	Adrian Mannarino	50	6
AUS	Matthew Ebden	54	7
ITA	Andreas Seppi	65	8

- Rankings are as of May 13, 2019.

=== Other entrants ===
The following players received wildcards into the singles main draw:

- (Spain) Feliciano López
- (Serbia) Janko Tipsarević
- (Switzerland) Stan Wawrinka

The following players received entry from the qualifying draw:

- (Bulgaria) Grigor Dimitrov
- (Bosnia and Herzegovina) Damir Džumhur
- (Italy) Lorenzo Sonego
- (Spain) Bernabé Zapata Miralles

=== Withdrawals ===
- (Italy) Matteo Berrettini → replaced by (United States) Denis Kudla
- (Serbia) Laslo Đere → replaced by (Spain) Albert Ramos Viñolas
- (Italy) Fabio Fognini → replaced by (Germany) Alexander Zverev
- (Netherlands) Robin Haase → replaced by (Germany) Mischa Zverev
- (Tunisia) Malek Jaziri → replaced by (Argentina) Federico Delbonis
- (Germany) Phieiber → replaced by (Germany) Peter Gojowczyk
- (Russia) Daniil Medvedev → replaced by (Japan) Taro Daniel
- (Spain) Jaume Munar → replaced by (Chile) Cristian Garín
- (Argentina) Guido Pella → replaced by (Chile) Nicolás Jarry

== Doubles main-draw entrants ==
=== Seeds ===
Country	Player	Country	Player	Rank^{1}	Seed
AUT	Oliver Marach	CRO	Mate Pavić	25	1
USA	Austin Krajicek	NZL	Artem Sitak	71	2
NZL	Marcus Daniell	JPN	Ben McLachlan	87	3
MEX	Santiago González	PAK	Aisam-ul-Haq Qureshi	107	4

- Rankings are as of May 13, 2019.

=== Other entrants ===
The following pairs received wildcards into the doubles main draw:

- (Switzerland) Marc-Andrea Hüsler / (Romania) Florin Mergea
- (Switzerland) Johan Nikles / (Serbia) Nenad Zimonjić

=== Withdrawals ===
During the tournament

- (Argentina) Federico Delbonis
- (Chile) Cristian Garín

== Champions ==
=== Singles ===
- (Germany) Alexander Zverev def. (Chile) Nicolás Jarry, 6–3, 3–6, 7–6^{(10–8)}

=== Doubles ===
- (Austria) Oliver Marach / (Croatia) Mate Pavić def. (Australia) Matthew Ebden / (Sweden) Robert Lindstedt, 6–4, 6–4
