= 2018 Geneva Open – Doubles =

Doubles
- 2018 Geneva Open

Final
- Champions: (Austria) Oliver Marach (Croatia) Mate Pavić
- Runners-up: (Croatia) Ivan Dodig (United States) Rajeev Ram
- Score: 3–6, 7–6^{(7–3)}, [11–9]

Details
- Draw: 16 (2 WC )
- Seeds: 4

Events
Singles	Doubles
← 2017 ·	Geneva Open	· 2019 →

Jean-Julien Rojer and Horia Tecău were the defending champions, but Tecău could not participate due to injury and Rojer chose to compete in Lyon instead.

Oliver Marach and Mate Pavić won the title, defeating Ivan Dodig and Rajeev Ram in the final, 3–6, 7–6^{(7–3)}, [11–9].

== Seeds ==
1. (Austria) Oliver Marach / (Croatia) Mate Pavić (champions)
2. (Croatia) Ivan Dodig / (United States) Rajeev Ram (final)
3. (Belarus) Max Mirnyi / (Austria) Philipp Oswald (first round)
4. (Brazil) Marcelo Demoliner / (Mexico) Santiago González (first round)

== Draw ==
=== Key ===
- Q = Qualifier
- WC = Wild card
- LL = Lucky loser
- Alt = Alternate
- SE = Special exempt
- PR = Protected ranking
- ITF = ITF entry
- JE = Junior exempt
- w/o = Walkover
- r = Retired
- d = Defaulted
- SR = Special ranking

=== Draw ===
First round
1	(Austria) O Marach (Croatia) M Pavić	6	6
(Italy) M Cecchinato (Italy) A Seppi	0	2
WC	(Romania) M Copil (Switzerland) C Sturdza	3	0
(Israel) J Erlich (Hungary) M Fucsovics	6	6
3	(Belarus) M Mirnyi (Austria) P Oswald	6	1	[5]
WC	(Switzerland) A Bellier (Switzerland) J Nikles	3	6	[10]
(Sweden) R Lindstedt (Belarus) A Vasilevski	7^{7}	7^{11}
(Germany) A Begemann (Croatia) A Šančić	6^{4}	6^{9}
(United States) S Johnson (United States) S Querrey	6	6
PR	(Germany) P Gojowczyk (Austria) A Haider-Maurer	3	4
(United Kingdom) D Inglot (Croatia) F Škugor	7^{7}	6
4	(Brazil) M Demoliner (Mexico) S González	6^{5}	4
(United States) S Lipsky (Spain) D Marrero	7^{8}	4	[10]
(Netherlands) W Koolhof (New Zealand) A Sitak	6^{6}	6	[7]
(Netherlands) S Arends (Canada) A Shamasdin	3	6^{3}
2	(Croatia) I Dodig (United States) R Ram	6	7^{7}

Quarterfinals
1	(Austria) O Marach (Croatia) M Pavić	6	7
(Israel) J Erlich (Hungary) M Fucsovics	4	5
WC	(Switzerland) A Bellier (Switzerland) J Nikles	6^{5}	6	[10]
(Sweden) R Lindstedt (Belarus) A Vasilevski	7^{7}	3	[12]
(United States) S Johnson (United States) S Querrey	6	6
(United Kingdom) D Inglot (Croatia) F Škugor	3	4
(United States) S Lipsky (Spain) D Marrero	6	1	[3]
2	(Croatia) I Dodig (United States) R Ram	4	6	[10]

Semifinals
1	(Austria) O Marach (Croatia) M Pavić	6	7^{7}
(Sweden) R Lindstedt (Belarus) A Vasilevski	1	6^{2}
(United States) S Johnson (United States) S Querrey	6^{9}	4
2	(Croatia) I Dodig (United States) R Ram	7^{11}	6

Final
1	(Austria) O Marach (Croatia) M Pavić	3	7^{7}	[11]
2	(Croatia) I Dodig (United States) R Ram	6	6^{3}	[9]
