= 1981 Geneva Open – Singles =

Singles
- 1981 Geneva Open

Final
- Champion: (Sweden) Björn Borg
- Runner-up: (Czechoslovakia) Tomáš Šmíd
- Score: 6–4, 6–3

Details
- Draw: 32
- Seeds: 8

Events
Singles	Doubles
← 1980 ·	Geneva Open	· 1982 →

Balázs Taróczy was the defending champion, but lost in the first round this year.

Björn Borg successfully defended his title, defeating Tomáš Šmíd 6–4, 6–3 in the final.

== Seeds ==
1. (Sweden) Björn Borg (champion)
2. (Paraguay) Víctor Pecci (second round)
3. (Hungary) Balázs Taróczy (first round)
4. (Czechoslovakia) Tomáš Šmíd (final)
5. (Uruguay) José Luis Damiani (quarterfinals)
6. (Argentina) Ricardo Cano (quarterfinals)
7. (Switzerland) Heinz Günthardt (quarterfinals)
8. N/A

== Draw ==
=== Key ===
- Q = Qualifier
- WC = Wild card
- LL = Lucky loser
- Alt = Alternate
- SE = Special exempt
- PR = Protected ranking
- ITF = ITF entry
- JE = Junior exempt
- w/o = Walkover
- r = Retired
- d = Defaulted
- SR = Special ranking

=== Finals ===
Semifinals
1	(Sweden) Björn Borg	6	0	6
(Spain) Manuel Orantes	4	6	1
4	(Czechoslovakia) Tomáš Šmíd	6	6
(Sweden) Joakim Nyström	1	0

Final
1	(Sweden) Björn Borg	6	6
4	(Czechoslovakia) Tomáš Šmíd	4	3

=== Top half ===
First round
1	(Sweden) B Borg	6	6
(Sweden) M Wilander	1	1
(Sweden) H Simonsson	2	3
(Peru) P Arraya	6	6
(Spain) J López-Maeso	3	7	6
(Switzerland) R Stadler	6	5	2
(South Africa) B Pirow	6	2	5
7	(Switzerland) H Günthardt	1	6	7
3	(Hungary) B Taróczy	4	6
(Spain) M Orantes	6	7
(Chile) P Rebolledo	1	4
(Uruguay) D Perez	6	6
(United States) J Brown	6	6
(Belgium) B Boileau	1	2
(Czechoslovakia) S Birner	6	4	3
5	(Uruguay) JL Damiani	3	6	6

Second round
1	(Sweden) B Borg	6	6
(Peru) P Arraya	2	2
(Spain) J López-Maeso	4	1
7	(Switzerland) H Günthardt	6	6
(Spain) M Orantes	7	6
(Uruguay) D Perez	5	2
(United States) J Brown	0	4
5	(Uruguay) JL Damiani	6	6

Quarterfinals
1	(Sweden) B Borg	6	6
7	(Switzerland) H Günthardt	2	3
(Spain) M Orantes	6	4	6
5	(Uruguay) JL Damiani	4	6	1

Semifinals
1	(Sweden) B Borg	6	0	6
(Spain) M Orantes	4	6	1

=== Bottom half ===
First round
(South Africa) F Punčec	4	7	3
(Ecuador) R Ycaza	6	6	6
(Switzerland) I Dupasquier	6	7
(Italy) P Bertolucci	3	5
(Hungary) Z Kuhárszky	6	3	2
(Bolivia) M Martinez	4	6	6
(Sweden) J Norbäck	1	0
4	(Czechoslovakia) T Šmíd	6	6
6	(Argentina) R Cano	6	7	6
(Czechoslovakia) P Složil	7	6	1
(France) B Fritz	4	4
(Socialist Federal Republic of Yugoslavia) Ž Franulović	6	6
(South Africa) R Venter	5	6	3
(Sweden) J Nyström	7	3	6
(South Africa) R Moore	2	2
2	(Paraguay) V Pecci	6	6

Second round
(Ecuador) R Ycaza	6	6
(Switzerland) I Dupasquier	3	4
(Bolivia) M Martinez	5	3
4	(Czechoslovakia) T Šmíd	7	6
6	(Argentina) R Cano	6	6
(Socialist Federal Republic of Yugoslavia) Ž Franulović	2	2
(Sweden) J Nyström	7	6
2	(Paraguay) V Pecci	5	3

Quarterfinals
(Ecuador) R Ycaza	1	1
4	(Czechoslovakia) T Šmíd	6	6
6	(Argentina) R Cano	3	3
(Sweden) J Nyström	6	6

Semifinals
4	(Czechoslovakia) T Šmíd	6	6
(Sweden) J Nyström	1	0
