= 2021 Geneva Open – Singles =

Singles
- 2021 Geneva Open

Final
- Champion: (Norway) Casper Ruud
- Runner-up: (Canada) Denis Shapovalov
- Score: 7–6^{(8–6)}, 6–4

Details
- Draw: 28 (4 Q / 3 WC )
- Seeds: 8

Events
Singles	Doubles
← 2019 ·	Geneva Open	· 2022 →

Alexander Zverev was the defending champion from when the event was held in 2019, but chose not to defend his title.

Casper Ruud won the title, defeating Denis Shapovalov in the final, 7–6^{(8–6)}, 6–4.

== Seeds ==
The top four seeds received a bye into the second round.

1. (Switzerland) Roger Federer (second round)
2. (Canada) Denis Shapovalov (final)
3. (Norway) Casper Ruud (champion)
4. (Bulgaria) Grigor Dimitrov (quarterfinals)
5. (Chile) Cristian Garín (withdrew)
6. (Italy) Fabio Fognini (second round)
7. (France) Benoît Paire (first round)
8. (France) Adrian Mannarino (first round)

== Draw ==
=== Key ===
- Q = Qualifier
- WC = Wild card
- LL = Lucky loser
- Alt = Alternate
- ITF = ITF entry
- PR = Protected ranking
- SR = Special ranking
- SE = Special exempt
- JE = Junior exempt
- JR = Junior Accelerator Programme entrant
- CO = College Accelerator Programme entrant
- NG = Next Gen Accelerator Program entrant
- w/o = Walkover
- r = Retired
- d = Defaulted

=== Finals ===
Semifinals
(Spain) Pablo Andújar	3	2
3	(Norway) Casper Ruud	6	6
Q	(Uruguay) Pablo Cuevas	4	5
2	(Canada) Denis Shapovalov	6	7

Final
3	(Norway) Casper Ruud	7^{8}	6
2	(Canada) Denis Shapovalov	6^{6}	4

=== Top half ===
First round
(Australia) J Thompson	0	4
(Spain) P Andújar	6	6
(Croatia) M Čilić	6^{5}	1
WC	(Switzerland) D Stricker	7^{7}	6
(Hungary) M Fucsovics	7	7
Q	(Switzerland) H Laaksonen	5	5
(United States) T Sandgren	6	6
(Italy) S Caruso	3	4
(Spain) F López	7^{8}	6
LL	(Germany) D Altmaier	6^{6}	4
(Germany) D Koepfer	6^{8}	7^{7}	6
7	(France) B Paire	7^{10}	6^{5}	4

Second round
1	(Switzerland) R Federer	4	6	4
(Spain) P Andújar	6	4	6
WC	(Switzerland) D Stricker	7	6
(Hungary) M Fucsovics	5	4
3	(Norway) C Ruud	7	6
(United States) T Sandgren	5	2
(Spain) F López	5	7^{7}	3
(Germany) D Koepfer	7	6^{1}	6

Quarterfinals
(Spain) P Andújar	4	6	6
WC	(Switzerland) D Stricker	6	4	4
3	(Norway) C Ruud	2	6	6
(Germany) D Koepfer	6	1	4

Semifinals
(Spain) P Andújar	3	2
3	(Norway) C Ruud	6	6

=== Bottom half ===
First round
8	(France) A Mannarino	3	7^{7}	3
WC	(France) A Cazaux	6	6^{5}	6
Q	(Uruguay) P Cuevas	7^{7}	6
(United States) R Opelka	6^{5}	2
(Spain) F Verdasco	6^{5}	4
Q	(Belarus) I Ivashka	7^{7}	6
6	(Italy) F Fognini	6	6
(Argentina) G Pella	2	2
(Brazil) T Monteiro	7^{9}	3	5
(Serbia) L Đere	6^{7}	6	7
(Italy) S Travaglia	3	0^{r}
Q	(Italy) M Cecchinato	6	3

Second round
WC	(France) A Cazaux	2	4
Q	(Uruguay) P Cuevas	6	6
Q	(Belarus) I Ivashka	4	4
4/WC	(Bulgaria) G Dimitrov	6	6
6	(Italy) F Fognini	3	7^{7}	1
(Serbia) L Đere	6	6^{2}	6
Q	(Italy) M Cecchinato	7^{7}	5	1
2	(Canada) D Shapovalov	6^{4}	7	6

Quarterfinals
Q	(Uruguay) P Cuevas	7^{7}	6
4/WC	(Bulgaria) G Dimitrov	6^{3}	3
(Serbia) L Đere	4	4
2	(Canada) D Shapovalov	6	6

Semifinals
Q	(Uruguay) P Cuevas	4	5
2	(Canada) D Shapovalov	6	7

== Qualifying ==
=== Seeds ===
1. (Belarus) Ilya Ivashka (qualified)
2. (Italy) Marco Cecchinato (qualified)
3. (Kazakhstan) Mikhail Kukushkin (first round)
4. (Uruguay) Pablo Cuevas (qualified)
5. (United States) Mackenzie McDonald (qualifying competition)
6. (Germany) Peter Gojowczyk (first round)
7. (Germany) Cedrik-Marcel Stebe (first round)
8. (Germany) Daniel Altmaier (qualifying competition, lucky loser)

=== Qualifiers ===
1. (Belarus) Ilya Ivashka
2. (Italy) Marco Cecchinato
3. (Switzerland) Henri Laaksonen
4. (Uruguay) Pablo Cuevas

=== Lucky loser ===
1. (Germany) Daniel Altmaier

=== Qualifying draw ===
==== First qualifier ====
First round
1	(Belarus) Ilya Ivashka	6	6
WC	(China) Li Hanwen	0	3
(India) Prajnesh Gunneswaran	3	6	3
5	(United States) Mackenzie McDonald	6	3	6

Qualifying competition
1	(Belarus) Ilya Ivashka	6	6
5	(United States) Mackenzie McDonald	4	3

==== Second qualifier ====
First round
2	(Italy) Marco Cecchinato	6	6
(Ukraine) Illya Marchenko	3	4
(Switzerland) Marc-Andrea Hüsler	6^{5}	2
8	(Germany) Daniel Altmaier	7^{7}	6

Qualifying competition
2	(Italy) Marco Cecchinato	6	7^{7}
8	(Germany) Daniel Altmaier	1	6^{5}

==== Third qualifier ====
First round
3	(Kazakhstan) Mikhail Kukushkin	3	1
(Chile) Alejandro Tabilo	6	6
(Switzerland) Henri Laaksonen	6	5	6
7	(Germany) Cedrik-Marcel Stebe	4	7	0

Qualifying competition
(Chile) Alejandro Tabilo	6	1	3
(Switzerland) Henri Laaksonen	2	6	6

==== Fourth qualifier ====
First round
4	(Uruguay) Pablo Cuevas	6	4	6
WC	(Switzerland) Jakub Paul	3	6	3
(Italy) Lorenzo Giustino	6	6
6	(Germany) Peter Gojowczyk	2	3

Qualifying competition
4	(Uruguay) Pablo Cuevas	6	6
(Italy) Lorenzo Giustino	2	4
