= 1981 Geneva Open – Doubles =

Doubles
- 1981 Geneva Open

Final
- Champions: (Switzerland) Heinz Günthardt (Hungary) Balázs Taróczy
- Runners-up: (Czechoslovakia) Pavel Složil (Czechoslovakia) Tomáš Šmíd
- Score: 6–4, 3–6, 6–2

Details
- Draw: 16
- Seeds: 4

Events
Singles	Doubles
- Geneva Open

Željko Franulović and Balázs Taróczy were the defending champions, but did not participate together this year. Franulović partnered José López-Maeso, losing in the quarterfinals. Taróczy partnered Heinz Günthardt, winning the title.

Günthardt and Taróczy won the title, defeating Pavel Složil and Tomáš Šmíd 6–4, 3–6, 6–2 in the final.

== Seeds ==
1. (Switzerland) Heinz Günthardt / (Hungary) Balázs Taróczy (champions)
2. (Czechoslovakia) Pavel Složil / (Czechoslovakia) Tomáš Šmíd (final)
3. (United States) Fred McNair / (South Africa) Raymond Moore (quarterfinals)
4. (Uruguay) José Luis Damiani / (Ecuador) Ricardo Ycaza (semifinals)

== Draw ==
Key

- Q = Qualifier
- WC = Wild card
- LL = Lucky loser
- Alt = Alternate
- ITF = ITF entry
- PR = Protected ranking
- SR = Special ranking
- SE = Special exempt
- JE = Junior exempt
- JR = Junior Accelerator Programme entrant
- CO = College Accelerator Programme entrant
- NG = Next Gen Accelerator Program entrant
- w/o = Walkover
- r = Retired
- d = Defaulted

=== Draw ===
First round
1	(Switzerland) H Günthardt (Hungary) B Taróczy	6	6
(South Africa) R Chappell (South Africa) R Venter	4	4
(Socialist Federal Republic of Yugoslavia) Ž Franulović (Spain) J López-Maeso	6	6
(United Kingdom) J Bates (United Kingdom) N Sears	4	1
3	(United States) F McNair (South Africa) R Moore	4	6	6
(South Africa) F Punčec (West Germany) H Theissen	6	1	3
(United States) J Chatman (Nigeria) N Odizor	6	6
(Peru) P Arraya (Bolivia) M Martinez	1	4
(Belgium) B Boileau (Paraguay) F González	6	6	6
(Czechoslovakia) S Birner (New Zealand) B Derlin	7	4	3
4	(Uruguay) JL Damiani (Ecuador) R Ycaza	6	6
(Switzerland) M Günthardt (Philippines) B Sison	3	2
(Switzerland) Edgar Schurmann (Switzerland) R Stadler	6	6
(United States) J Brown (Switzerland) I Dupasquier	1	2
(Argentina) R Cano (Paraguay) V Pecci	7	4	6
2	(Czechoslovakia) P Složil (Czechoslovakia) T Šmíd	5	6	8

Quarterfinals
1	(Switzerland) H Günthardt (Hungary) B Taróczy	6	6
(Socialist Federal Republic of Yugoslavia) Ž Franulović (Spain) J López-Maeso	1	1
3	(United States) F McNair (South Africa) R Moore	3	6	2
(United States) J Chatman (Nigeria) N Odizor	6	4	6
(Belgium) B Boileau (Paraguay) F González	0	2
4	(Uruguay) JL Damiani (Ecuador) R Ycaza	6	6
(Switzerland) E Schurmann (Switzerland) R Stadler	2	2
2	(Czechoslovakia) P Složil (Czechoslovakia) T Šmíd	6	6

Semifinals
1	(Switzerland) H Günthardt (Hungary) B Taróczy	6	6
(United States) J Chatman (Nigeria) N Odizor	3	2
4	(Uruguay) JL Damiani (Ecuador) R Ycaza	6	4	7
2	(Czechoslovakia) P Složil (Czechoslovakia) T Šmíd	4	6	9

Final
1	(Switzerland) H Günthardt (Hungary) B Taróczy	6	3	6
2	(Czechoslovakia) P Složil (Czechoslovakia) T Šmíd	4	6	2
