= 1981 Geneva Open =

Tennis tournament

- Date: 21–27 September
- Edition: 2nd
- Category: Grand Prix
- Draw: 32S / 16D
- Prize money: $75,000
- Surface: Clay / outdoor
- Location: Geneva, Switzerland

Champions

Singles
- (Sweden) Björn Borg

Doubles
- (Switzerland) Heinz Günthardt / (Hungary) Balázs Taróczy
- Geneva Open

The 1981 Geneva Open was a men's tennis tournament played on clay courts that was part of the 1981 Volvo Grand Prix. It was played at Geneva, Switzerland and was held from 21 September until 27 September 1981. First-seeded Björn Borg won the singles title.

== Finals ==
=== Singles ===
(Sweden) Björn Borg defeated (Czechoslovakia) Tomáš Šmíd 6–4, 6–3

- It was Borg's 3rd singles title of the year and the 66th and last of his career.

=== Doubles ===
(Switzerland) Heinz Günthardt / (Hungary) Balázs Taróczy defeated (Czechoslovakia) Pavel Složil / (Czechoslovakia) Tomáš Šmíd 6–4, 3–6, 6–2

- It was Günthardt's 7th title of the year and the 17th of his career. It was Taróczy's 6th title of the year and the 23rd of his career.
