= 1980 Geneva Open =

- Date: September 22–28
- Edition: 1st
- Category: Grand Prix
- Draw: 32S / 16D
- Prize money: $75,000
- Surface: Clay / outdoor
- Location: Geneva, Switzerland

Champions

Singles
- (Hungary) Balázs Taróczy

Doubles
- (Socialist Federal Republic of Yugoslavia) Željko Franulović / (Hungary) Balázs Taróczy
- Geneva Open

The 1980 Geneva Open was a men's tennis tournament played on outdoor clay courts that was part of the 1980 Volvo Grand Prix. It was played at Geneva in Switzerland and was held from 22 September until 28 September 1980. Third-seeded Balázs Taróczy won the singles title.

== Finals ==
=== Singles ===
(Hungary) Balázs Taróczy defeated (Italy) Adriano Panatta 6–3, 6–2

- It was Taróczy's 3rd singles title of the year and the 9th of his career.

=== Doubles ===
(Socialist Federal Republic of Yugoslavia) Željko Franulović / (Hungary) Balázs Taróczy defeated (Switzerland) Heinz Günthardt / (Switzerland) Markus Günthardt 6–4, 4–6, 6–4

- It was Franulović's only title of the year and the 16th of his career. It was Taróczy's 5th title of the year and the 16th of his career.
