= 2019 Geneva Open – Doubles =

Doubles
- 2019 Geneva Open

Final
- Champions: (Austria) Oliver Marach (Croatia) Mate Pavić
- Runners-up: (Australia) Matthew Ebden (Sweden) Robert Lindstedt
- Score: 6–4, 6–4

Details
- Draw: 16 (2 WC )
- Seeds: 4

Events
Singles	Doubles
← 2018 ·	Geneva Open	· 2021 →

Oliver Marach and Mate Pavić were the defending champions, and successfully defended their title, defeating Matthew Ebden and Robert Lindstedt in the final, 6–4, 6–4.

== Seeds ==
1. (Austria) Oliver Marach / (Croatia) Mate Pavić (champions)
2. (United States) Austin Krajicek / (New Zealand) Artem Sitak (first round)
3. (New Zealand) Marcus Daniell / (Japan) Ben McLachlan (first round)
4. (Mexico) Santiago González / (Pakistan) Aisam-ul-Haq Qureshi (first round)

== Draw ==
=== Key ===
- Q = Qualifier
- WC = Wild card
- LL = Lucky loser
- Alt = Alternate
- SE = Special exempt
- PR = Protected ranking
- ITF = ITF entry
- JE = Junior exempt
- w/o = Walkover
- r = Retired
- d = Defaulted
- SR = Special ranking

=== Draw ===
First round
1	(Austria) O Marach (Croatia) M Pavić	6	7^{7}
(Lithuania) R Berankis (Japan) Y Nishioka	4	6^{3}
(Chinese Taipei) C-p Hsieh (Indonesia) C Rungkat	6	3	[10]
(El Salvador) M Arévalo (Mexico) MÁ Reyes-Varela	2	6	[7]
4	(Mexico) S González (Pakistan) A-u-H Qureshi	2	6^{3}
(France) F Martin (Germany) A Mies	6	7^{7}
(Argentina) F Delbonis (Argentina) L Mayer	7^{7}	6
(Ukraine) D Molchanov (Slovakia) I Zelenay	6^{4}	1
WC	(Switzerland) M-A Hüsler (Romania) F Mergea	4	4
(Austria) P Oswald (India) D Sharan	6	6
(Japan) T Daniel (Hungary) M Fucsovics	7^{7}	6
3	(New Zealand) M Daniell (Japan) B McLachlan	6^{3}	3
(Chile) C Garín (Argentina) JI Londero	6	6
WC	(Switzerland) J Nikles (Serbia) N Zimonjić	4	2
(Australia) M Ebden (Sweden) R Lindstedt	6	7^{11}
2	(United States) A Krajicek (New Zealand) A Sitak	3	6^{9}

Quarterfinals
1	(Austria) O Marach (Croatia) M Pavić	7^{7}	6
(Chinese Taipei) C-p Hsieh (Indonesia) C Rungkat	6^{5}	3
(France) F Martin (Germany) A Mies	w/o
(Argentina) F Delbonis (Argentina) L Mayer
(Austria) P Oswald (India) D Sharan	6	3	[10]
(Japan) T Daniel (Hungary) M Fucsovics	4	6	[8]
(Chile) C Garín (Argentina) JI Londero
(Australia) M Ebden (Sweden) R Lindstedt	w/o

Semifinals
1	(Austria) O Marach (Croatia) M Pavić	6	3	[13]
(France) F Martin (Germany) A Mies	3	6	[11]
(Austria) P Oswald (India) D Sharan	3	2
(Australia) M Ebden (Sweden) R Lindstedt	6	6

Final
1	(Austria) O Marach (Croatia) M Pavić	6	6
(Australia) M Ebden (Sweden) R Lindstedt	4	4
