= 2018 Geneva Open – Singles =

Singles
- 2018 Geneva Open

Final
- Champion: (Hungary) Márton Fucsovics
- Runner-up: (Germany) Peter Gojowczyk
- Score: 6–2, 6–2

Details
- Draw: 28 (4 Q / 3 WC )
- Seeds: 8

Events
Singles	Doubles
- Geneva Open

Stan Wawrinka was the two-time defending champion but lost to Márton Fucsovics in the quarterfinals.

Fucsovics went on to win his first ATP World Tour singles title, defeating Peter Gojowczyk in the final, 6–2, 6–2. Fucsovics became the first Hungarian player to win an ATP World Tour singles title since Balázs Taróczy in 1982.

== Seeds ==
The top four seeds receive a bye into the second round.

1. (United States) Sam Querrey (second round)
2. (Italy) Fabio Fognini (semifinals)
3. (Switzerland) Stan Wawrinka (quarterfinals)
4. (Spain) David Ferrer (second round)
5. (Spain) Albert Ramos Viñolas (first round)
6. (United States) Steve Johnson (semifinals)
7. (Italy) Andreas Seppi (quarterfinals)
8. (Germany) Mischa Zverev (first round)

== Draw ==
Key

- Q = Qualifier
- WC = Wild card
- LL = Lucky loser
- Alt = Alternate
- ITF = ITF entry
- PR = Protected ranking
- SR = Special ranking
- SE = Special exempt
- JE = Junior exempt
- JR = Junior Accelerator Programme entrant
- CO = College Accelerator Programme entrant
- NG = Next Gen Accelerator Program entrant
- w/o = Walkover
- r = Retired
- d = Defaulted

=== Finals ===
Semifinals
6	(United States) Steve Johnson	6	4	1
(Hungary) Márton Fucsovics	2	6	6
(Germany) Peter Gojowczyk	6	6
2/WC	(Italy) Fabio Fognini	4	4

Final
(Hungary) Márton Fucsovics	6	6
(Germany) Peter Gojowczyk	2	2

=== Top half ===
First round
Q	(Germany) D Köpfer	3	4
(Argentina) G Pella	6	6
(Czech Republic) J Veselý	6	6^{6}	6^{4}
Q	(Czech Republic) L Rosol	2	7^{8}	7^{7}
(Romania) M Copil	6^{4}	3
6	(United States) S Johnson	7^{7}	6
(United States) J Donaldson	5	6	6
(Uzbekistan) D Istomin	7	4	0
(United States) F Tiafoe	3	7^{7}	6
(United States) R Harrison	6	6^{5}	4
(Hungary) M Fucsovics	6	6
5	(Spain) A Ramos Viñolas	1	2

Second round
1	(United States) S Querrey	5	7^{8}	6^{4}
(Argentina) G Pella	7	6^{6}	7^{7}
Q	(Czech Republic) L Rosol	4	6	3
6	(United States) S Johnson	6	4	6
3/WC	(Switzerland) S Wawrinka	6	6
(United States) J Donaldson	3	4
(United States) F Tiafoe	6^{5}	4
(Hungary) M Fucsovics	7^{7}	6

Quarterfinals
(Argentina) G Pella	3	4
6	(United States) S Johnson	6	6
3/WC	(Switzerland) S Wawrinka	4	0
(Hungary) M Fucsovics	6	6

Semifinals
6	(United States) S Johnson	6	4	1
(Hungary) M Fucsovics	2	6	6

=== Bottom half ===
First round
7	(Italy) A Seppi	7	6
(Italy) M Cecchinato	5	4
(Germany) F Mayer	3	2
Q	(Spain) B Zapata Miralles	6	6
(Croatia) I Karlović	6^{4}	6	6^{1}
(Germany) P Gojowczyk	7^{7}	4	7^{7}
8	(Germany) M Zverev	7	3	4
(Bosnia and Herzegovina) M Bašić	5	6	6
PR	(Austria) A Haider-Maurer	6	1	0
(United States) T Sandgren	1	6	6
(Cyprus) M Baghdatis	6^{4}	4
Q	(United States) N Rubin	7^{7}	6

Second round
7	(Italy) A Seppi	7	6
Q	(Spain) B Zapata Miralles	5	3
(Germany) P Gojowczyk	6	6
4/WC	(Spain) D Ferrer	2	4
(Bosnia and Herzegovina) M Bašić	3	2
(United States) T Sandgren	6	6
Q	(United States) N Rubin	7^{7}	2	2
2/WC	(Italy) F Fognini	6^{5}	6	6

Quarterfinals
7	(Italy) A Seppi	3	7^{7}	3
(Germany) P Gojowczyk	6	6^{3}	6
(United States) T Sandgren	6^{3}	6^{5}
2/WC	(Italy) F Fognini	7^{7}	7^{7}

Semifinals
(Germany) P Gojowczyk	6	6
2/WC	(Italy) F Fognini	4	4

== Qualifying ==
=== Seeds ===
1. (Spain) Pablo Andújar (qualifying competition)
2. (Croatia) Nino Serdarušić (first round)
3. (United States) Noah Rubin (qualified)
4. (Italy) Matteo Donati (first round)
5. (Germany) Jan Choinski (first round)
6. (Germany) Dominik Köpfer (qualified)
7. (Czech Republic) Lukáš Rosol (qualified)
8. (Spain) Bernabé Zapata Miralles (qualified)

=== Qualifiers ===
1. (Germany) Dominik Köpfer
2. (Czech Republic) Lukáš Rosol
3. (United States) Noah Rubin
4. (Spain) Bernabé Zapata Miralles

=== Qualifying draw ===
==== First qualifier ====
First round
1	(Spain) Pablo Andújar	6	6
WC	(Switzerland) Antoine Bellier	3	2
(Spain) Gerard Granollers	2	0
6	(Germany) Dominik Köpfer	6	6

Qualifying competition
1	(Spain) Pablo Andújar	3	5
6	(Germany) Dominik Köpfer	6	7

==== Second qualifier ====
First round
2	(Croatia) Nino Serdarušić	4	4
(Germany) Jeremy Jahn	6	6
(Russia) Ivan Gakhov	1	3
7	(Czech Republic) Lukáš Rosol	6	6

Qualifying competition
(Germany) Jeremy Jahn	7^{15}	3	5
7	(Czech Republic) Lukáš Rosol	6^{13}	6	7

==== Third qualifier ====
First round
3	(United States) Noah Rubin	3	7^{7}	6
(Croatia) Franko Škugor	6	6^{4}	4
(Canada) Frank Dancevic	7^{7}	7
5	(Germany) Jan Choinski	6^{4}	5

Qualifying competition
3	(United States) Noah Rubin	7^{7}	7^{7}
(Canada) Frank Dancevic	6^{2}	6^{3}

==== Fourth qualifier ====
First round
4	(Italy) Matteo Donati	2	4
WC	(Serbia) Marko Miladinović	6	6
(Italy) Andrea Pellegrino	7	1	1
8	(Spain) Bernabé Zapata Miralles	5	6	6

Qualifying competition
WC	(Serbia) Marko Miladinović	4	1
8	(Spain) Bernabé Zapata Miralles	6	6
