= 2018 Geneva Open =

- Date: 20–26 May
- Edition: 16th
- Category: ATP World Tour 250
- Draw: 28S / 16D
- Prize money: €501,345
- Surface: Clay
- Location: Geneva, Switzerland
- Venue: Tennis Club de Genève

Champions

Singles
- (Hungary) Márton Fucsovics

Doubles
- (Austria) Oliver Marach / (Croatia) Mate Pavić
← 2017 ·	Geneva Open	· 2019 →

The 2018 Geneva Open (also known as the Banque Eric Sturdza Geneva Open for sponsorship reasons) was a men's tennis tournament played on outdoor clay courts. It was the 16th edition of the Geneva Open and part of the ATP World Tour 250 series of the 2018 ATP World Tour. It took place at the Tennis Club de Genève in Geneva, Switzerland, from May 20 through May 26, 2018.

== Singles main draw entrants ==
=== Seeds ===
Country	Player	Rank^{1}	Seed
USA	Sam Querrey	13	1
ITA	Fabio Fognini	19	2
SUI	Stan Wawrinka	25	3
ESP	Albert Ramos Viñolas	36	4
ESP	David Ferrer	42	5
USA	Steve Johnson	47	6
ITA	Andreas Seppi	51	7
GER	Mischa Zverev	52	8

- Rankings are as of May 14, 2018.

=== Other entrants ===
The following players received wildcards into the singles main draw:

- (Spain) David Ferrer
- (Italy) Fabio Fognini
- (Switzerland) Stan Wawrinka

The following players received entry from the qualifying draw:

- (Germany) Dominik Köpfer
- (Czech Republic) Lukáš Rosol
- (United States) Noah Rubin
- (Spain) Bernabé Zapata Miralles

=== Withdrawals ===
Before the tournament

- (Ukraine) Alexandr Dolgopolov → replaced by (Cyprus) Marcos Baghdatis
- (Belgium) David Goffin → replaced by (Germany) Florian Mayer
- (Germany) Philipp Kohlschreiber → replaced by (Bosnia and Herzegovina) Mirza Bašić
- (Italy) Paolo Lorenzi → replaced by (Italy) Marco Cecchinato
- (Canada) Denis Shapovalov → replaced by (Croatia) Ivo Karlović

== Doubles main draw entrants ==
=== Seeds ===
Country	Player	Country	Player	Rank^{1}	Seed
AUT	Oliver Marach	CRO	Mate Pavić	11	1
CRO	Ivan Dodig	USA	Rajeev Ram	37	2
BLR	Max Mirnyi	AUT	Philipp Oswald	80	3
BRA	Marcelo Demoliner	MEX	Santiago González	87	4

- Rankings are as of May 14, 2018.

=== Other entrants ===
The following pairs received wildcards into the doubles main draw:

- (Switzerland) Antoine Bellier / (Switzerland) Johan Nikles
- (Romania) Marius Copil / (Switzerland) Constantin Sturdza

== Champions ==
=== Singles ===
- (Hungary) Márton Fucsovics def. (Germany) Peter Gojowczyk, 6–2, 6-2

=== Doubles ===
- (Austria) Oliver Marach / (Croatia) Mate Pavić def. (Croatia) Ivan Dodig / (United States) Rajeev Ram, 3–6, 7–6^{(7–3)}, [11–9]
