= 2021 Geneva Open – Doubles =

Doubles
- 2021 Geneva Open

Final
- Champions: (Australia) John Peers (New Zealand) Michael Venus
- Runners-up: (Italy) Simone Bolelli (Argentina) Máximo González
- Score: 6–2, 7–5

Events
| Singles | Doubles |
- Geneva Open

Oliver Marach and Mate Pavić were the two-time defending champions from when the event was last held in 2019 but lost in the first round to Tomislav Brkić and Nikola Ćaćić.

John Peers and Michael Venus won the title, defeating Simone Bolelli and Máximo González in the final, 6–2, 7–5.

== Seeds ==
1. (Austria) Oliver Marach / (Croatia) Mate Pavić (first round)
2. (Australia) John Peers / (New Zealand) Michael Venus (champions)
3. (South Africa) Raven Klaasen / (Japan) Ben McLachlan (semifinals)
4. (India) Rohan Bopanna / (Croatia) Franko Škugor (quarterfinals)

== Draw ==
Key

- Q = Qualifier
- WC = Wild card
- LL = Lucky loser
- Alt = Alternate
- ITF = ITF entry
- PR = Protected ranking
- SR = Special ranking
- SE = Special exempt
- JE = Junior exempt
- JR = Junior Accelerator Programme entrant
- CO = College Accelerator Programme entrant
- NG = Next Gen Accelerator Program entrant
- w/o = Walkover
- r = Retired
- d = Defaulted

=== Draw ===
First round
1 | (Austria) O Marach (Croatia) M Pavić | 6^{6} | 2
(Bosnia and Herzegovina) T Brkić (Serbia) N Ćaćić | 7^{8} | 6
(Australia) M Purcell (Australia) L Saville | 6^{3} | 6^{2}
(Italy) S Bolelli (Argentina) M González | 7^{7} | 7^{7}
3 | (South Africa) R Klaasen (Japan) B McLachlan | 6 | 7^{7}
(United Kingdom) L Bambridge (United Kingdom) D Inglot | 3 | 6^{4}
(Croatia) M Čilić (Kazakhstan) A Golubev | 7^{7} | 6
WC | (France) A Cazaux (China) H Li | 6^{5} | 3
(United States) N Lammons (United States) J Withrow | 3 | 4
(Uruguay) A Behar (Ecuador) G Escobar | 6 | 6
(Uruguay) P Cuevas (Argentina) G Pella
4 | (India) R Bopanna (Croatia) F Škugor | w/o
WC | (Switzerland) M-A Hüsler (Switzerland) D Stricker | 7^{7} | 6
(United States) N Monroe (France) B Paire | 6^{3} | 1
(El Salvador) M Arévalo (Netherlands) M Middelkoop | 1 | 4
2 | (Australia) J Peers (New Zealand) M Venus | 6 | 6

Quarterfinals
(Bosnia and Herzegovina) T Brkić (Serbia) N Ćaćić | 3 | 6^{7}
(Italy) S Bolelli (Argentina) M González | 6 | 7^{9}
3 | (South Africa) R Klaasen (Japan) B McLachlan | 6 | 7^{7}
(Croatia) M Čilić (Kazakhstan) A Golubev | 3 | 6^{4}
(Uruguay) A Behar (Ecuador) G Escobar | 6 | 3 | [13]
4 | (India) R Bopanna (Croatia) F Škugor | 3 | 6 | [11]
WC | (Switzerland) M-A Hüsler (Switzerland) D Stricker | 3 | 6 | [9]
2 | (Australia) J Peers (New Zealand) M Venus | 6 | 1 | [11]

Semifinals
(Italy) S Bolelli (Argentina) M González | 3 | 6 | [10]
3 | (South Africa) R Klaasen (Japan) B McLachlan | 6 | 3 | [4]
(Uruguay) A Behar (Ecuador) G Escobar | 6 | 6^{2} | [8]
2 | (Australia) J Peers (New Zealand) M Venus | 4 | 7^{7} | [10]

Final
(Italy) S Bolelli (Argentina) M González | 2 | 5
2 | (Australia) J Peers (New Zealand) M Venus | 6 | 7
