= 2021 Geneva Open =

ATP tennis tournament

- Date: 15 – 22 May
- Edition: 18th
- Category: ATP Tour 250
- Draw: 28S / 16D
- Prize money: €481,270
- Surface: Clay
- Location: Geneva, Switzerland
- Venue: Tennis Club de Genève

Champions

Singles
- (Norway) Casper Ruud

Doubles
- (Australia) John Peers / (New Zealand) Michael Venus
- Geneva Open

The 2021 Gonet Geneva Open was an ATP 250 tennis tournament played on outdoor clay courts. It was the 18th edition of the Geneva Open and part of the ATP Tour 250 series of the 2021 ATP Tour. It took place at the Tennis Club de Genève in Geneva, Switzerland, from May 15 through May 22, 2021.

== Champions ==
=== Singles ===
- (Norway) Casper Ruud def. (Canada) Denis Shapovalov, 7–6^{(8–6)}, 6–4

=== Doubles ===
- (Australia) John Peers / (New Zealand) Michael Venus def. (Italy) Simone Bolelli / (Argentina) Máximo González, 6–2, 7–5

== Points and prize money ==
=== Point distribution ===
Event	W	F	SF	QF	Round of 16	Round of 32	Q	Q2	Q1
Singles	250	150	90	45	20	0	12	6	0
Doubles	250	150	90	45	0	—N/a	—N/a	—N/a	—N/a

=== Prize money ===
Event	W	F	SF	QF	Round of 16	Round of 32	Q2	Q1
Singles	€41,145	€29,500	€21,000	€14,000	€9,000	€5,415	€2,645	€1,375
Doubles*	€15,360	€11,000	€7,250	€4,710	€2,760	—N/a	—N/a	—N/a

_{*per team}

== Singles main draw entrants ==
=== Seeds ===
Country	Player	Rank^{1}	Seed
SUI	Roger Federer	8	1
CAN	Denis Shapovalov	14	2
NOR	Casper Ruud	16	3
BUL	Grigor Dimitrov	17	4
~~CHI~~	~~Cristian Garín~~	~~22~~	~~5~~
ITA	Fabio Fognini	28	6
FRA	Benoît Paire	35	7
FRA	Adrian Mannarino	36	8

- Rankings are as of May 10, 2021.

=== Other entrants ===
The following players received wildcards into the singles main draw:

- (Bulgaria) Grigor Dimitrov
- (France) Arthur Cazaux
- (Switzerland) Dominic Stricker

The following players received entry from the qualifying draw:

- (Italy) Marco Cecchinato
- (Uruguay) Pablo Cuevas
- (Belarus) Ilya Ivashka
- (Switzerland) Henri Laaksonen

The following player received entry as a lucky loser:

- (Germany) Daniel Altmaier

=== Withdrawals ===
Before the tournament

- (Kazakhstan) Alexander Bublik → replaced by (United States) Tennys Sandgren
- (Croatia) Borna Ćorić → replaced by (Spain) Feliciano López
- (Spain) Alejandro Davidovich Fokina → replaced by (Brazil) Thiago Monteiro
- (Australia) Alex de Minaur → replaced by (Australia) Jordan Thompson
- (Chile) Cristian Garín → replaced by (Germany) Daniel Altmaier
- (Serbia) Filip Krajinović → replaced by (Italy) Salvatore Caruso
- (Germany) Jan-Lennard Struff → replaced by (Spain) Fernando Verdasco

=== Retirements ===
- (Italy) Stefano Travaglia

== Doubles main draw entrants ==
=== Seeds ===
Country	Player	Country	Player	Rank^{1}	Seed
AUT	Oliver Marach	CRO	Mate Pavić	31	1
AUS	John Peers	NZL	Michael Venus	42	2
RSA	Raven Klaasen	JPN	Ben McLachlan	65	3
IND	Rohan Bopanna	CRO	Franko Škugor	73	4

- Rankings are as of May 10, 2021.

=== Other entrants ===
The following pairs received wildcards into the doubles main draw:

- (France) Arthur Cazaux / (China) Li Hanwen
- (Switzerland) Marc-Andrea Hüsler / (Switzerland) Dominic Stricker

=== Withdrawals ===
Before the tournament

- (Australia) Alex de Minaur / (Australia) Jordan Thompson → replaced by (United States) Nathaniel Lammons / (United States) Jackson Withrow
- (Netherlands) Wesley Koolhof / (Netherlands) Jean-Julien Rojer → replaced by (Croatia) Marin Čilić / (Kazakhstan) Andrey Golubev
- (United States) Nicholas Monroe / (United States) Reilly Opelka → replaced by (United States) Nicholas Monroe / (France) Benoît Paire
- (United States) Rajeev Ram / (United Kingdom) Joe Salisbury → replaced by (Uruguay) Pablo Cuevas / (Argentina) Guido Pella
