= Michael Mortensen =

Danish tennis player

- Country (sports): Denmark
- Born: 12 March 1961 (age 65) Glostrup, Denmark
- Height: 1.88 m (6 ft 2 in)
- Retired: 1994
- Plays: Right-handed
- Prize money: $267,435

Singles
- Career record: 3–9
- Career titles: 0
- Highest ranking: 301 (26 November 1984)

Doubles
- Career record: 144–165
- Career titles: 5
- Highest ranking: No. 34 (18 April 1988)

Grand Slam doubles results
- Australian Open: 1R (1989)
- French Open: 3R (1985, 1989)
- Wimbledon: 2R (1985, 1986, 1987, 1988, 1990)
- US Open: QF (1985)

Coaching career (2011–)
- Li Na (2011); Caroline Wozniacki (2014)

Coaching achievements
- Coachee singles titles total: 1
- List of notable tournaments (with champion) French Open (Li)

Michael Mortensen (born 12 March 1961) is a former professional tennis player from Denmark.

Mortensen achieved a career-high doubles ranking of world No. 34 in 1988 and a career-high singles ranking of world No. 301 in 1984. He won five ATP doubles titles.

Mortensen participated in 22 Davis Cup ties for Denmark from 1979 to 1990, posting an 11–13 record in doubles and a 12–14 record in singles.

Mortensen later became a coach. He was the captain of the Denmark Fed Cup team in 2011 competing for 2011 Fed Cup Europe/Africa Zone Group I. Among players he coached was the WTA top-5 player and Chinese No. 1 Li Na, who won the 2011 French Open Women's Singles title under Mortensen.

== Career finals ==
=== Doubles: 12 (5 titles, 7 runner-ups) ===
Result	W-L	Date	Tournament	Surface	Partner	Opponents	Score
Win	1–0	Apr 1984	Nice, France	Clay	(Sweden) Jan Gunnarsson	(Chile) Hans Gildemeister (Ecuador) Andrés Gómez	6–1, 7–5
Win	2–0	Jul 1984	Båstad, Sweden	Clay	(Sweden) Jan Gunnarsson	(Spain) Juan Avendaño (Brazil) Fernando Roese	6–0, 6–0
Win	3–0	Sep 1984	Geneva, Switzerland	Clay	(Sweden) Mats Wilander	(Belgium) Libor Pimek (Czech Republic) Tomáš Šmíd	6–1, 3–6, 7–5
Win	4–0	Nov 1984	Toulouse, France	Hard (i)	(Sweden) Jan Gunnarsson	(Czech Republic) Pavel Složil (United States) Tim Wilkison	6–4, 6–2
Loss	4–1	Sep 1985	Barcelona, Spain	Clay	(Sweden) Jan Gunnarsson	(Spain) Sergio Casal (Spain) Emilio Sánchez	3–6, 3–6
Loss	4–2	Apr 1987	Monte Carlo, Monaco	Clay	(Iran) Mansour Bahrami	(Chile) Hans Gildemeister (Ecuador) Andrés Gómez	2–6, 4–6
Loss	4–3	Feb 1988	Lyon, France	Carpet (i)	(United States) Blaine Willenborg	(Australia) Brad Drewett (Australia) Broderick Dyke	6–3, 3–6, 4–6
Loss	4–4	Jul 1988	Stuttgart Outdoor, Germany	Clay	(Sweden) Anders Järryd	(Spain) Sergio Casal (Spain) Emilio Sánchez	6–4, 3–6, 4–6
Loss	4–5	Aug 1988	Rye Brook, United States	Hard	(United Kingdom) Jeremy Bates	(United Kingdom) Andrew Castle (United States) Tim Wilkison	6–4, 5–7, 6–7
Win	5–5	Feb 1989	Lyon, France	Carpet (i)	(Germany) Eric Jelen	(Switzerland) Jakob Hlasek (United States) John McEnroe	6–2, 3–6, 6–3
Loss	5–6	Feb 1990	Stuttgart Indoor, Germany	Carpet (i)	(Netherlands) Tom Nijssen	(Switzerland) Jakob Hlasek (France) Guy Forget	3–6, 2–6
Loss	5–7	Oct 1990	Toulouse, France	Hard (i)	(Netherlands) Michiel Schapers	(United Kingdom) Neil Broad (South Africa) Gary Muller	6–7, 4–6
