= Fabrizio Fanucci =

Italian tennis player and coach

- Country (sports): Italy
- Born: 3 October 1956 (age 68); Florence, Italy

Singles
- Career record: 1–6
- Highest ranking: No. 309 (4 January 1982)

Grand Slam singles results
- French Open: Q1 (1975)

Doubles
- Career record: 2–9
- Highest ranking: No. 400 (3 January 1983)

Fabrizio Fanucci (born 3 October 1956) is an Italian former professional tennis player and coach. Players he coached include Potito Starace, Adrian Ungur and Filippo Volandri.

The son of a chef, Fanucci began competing on the professional circuit in the late 1970s. His most noteworthy performance was a win over the eighth seeded John Alexander at the 1981 Alitalia Open, held in his native Florence.
