= Tomáš Šmíd =

Czech tennis player (born 1956)

- Country (sports): Czechoslovakia
- Born: 20 May 1956 (age 70) Plzeň, Czechoslovakia (now Czech Republic)
- Height: 1.91 m (6 ft 3 in)
- Turned pro: 1976
- Retired: 1992
- Plays: Right-handed (one-handed backhand)
- Prize money: $3,699,063

Singles
- Career record: 522–334
- Career titles: 9
- Highest ranking: No. 11 (16 July 1984)

Grand Slam singles results
- Australian Open: QF (1983)
- French Open: 4R (1985)
- Wimbledon: QF (1984)
- US Open: 4R (1984, 1985)

Other tournaments
- Tour Finals: QF (1983)
- WCT Finals: QF (1982, 1983)

Doubles
- Career record: 667–324 (67.3%)
- Career titles: 56
- Highest ranking: No. 1 (17 December 1984)

Grand Slam doubles results
- Australian Open: 3R (1983)
- French Open: W (1986)
- Wimbledon: QF (1988)
- US Open: W (1984)

Other doubles tournaments
- Tour Finals: W (1987)
Medal record
Tennis
Summer Universiade
| Gold medal – first place | 1977 Sofia | Singles |
| Gold medal – first place | 1977 Sofia | Doubles |

Tomáš Šmíd (born 20 May 1956) is a former tennis player from Czechoslovakia, who won nine singles titles during his career. In doubles, he won 54 titles and was world No. 1 in doubles from December 17, 1984, to August 11, 1985. The right-hander reached his highest ATP singles ranking of world No. 11 in July 1984. Šmíd participated in 31 Davis Cup ties for Czechoslovakia from 1977 to 1989, posting a 20–10 record in doubles and a 22–15 record in singles. Šmíd was a part of the winning 1980 Davis Cup team, a team which included Ivan Lendl. In the final against Italy, Šmíd won a singles rubber against Adriano Panatta after being two sets down, and won the doubles rubber when partnered with Lendl as they beat Panatta and Paolo Bertolucci to clinch the 1980 Davis Cup for Czechoslovakia.

Šmíd coached Boris Becker for 14 months, from April 1991 until June 1992, during which time Becker reached the 1991 Wimbledon final and regained the world number 1 ranking for nine weeks. Becker lost the number 1 ranking after a third round loss at the 1991 US Open to Paul Haarhuis. In terms of Becker winning a tournament during the time when Šmíd was his coach, the high point was when Becker came back from two sets down to defeat world number 1, Jim Courier, in the final of the Brussels tournament in February 1992. Becker ended the coaching arrangement with Šmíd in June 1992.

== Grand Slam finals ==
=== Doubles: 3 (2 wins, 1 loss) ===
| Result | Year | Championship | Surface | Partner | Opponents | Score |
|---|---|---|---|---|---|---|
| Loss | 1984 | French Open | Clay | (Czechoslovakia) Pavel Složil | (France) Henri Leconte (France) Yannick Noah | 4–6, 6–2, 6–3, 3–6, 2–6 |
| Win | 1984 | US Open | Hard | (Australia) John Fitzgerald | (Sweden) Stefan Edberg (Sweden) Anders Järryd | 7–6, 6–3, 6–3 |
| Win | 1986 | French Open | Clay | (Australia) John Fitzgerald | (Sweden) Stefan Edberg (Sweden) Anders Järryd | 6–3, 4–6, 6–3, 6–7, 14–12 |

== Career finals ==
=== Singles: 28 (9 wins / 19 losses) ===
| Result | W-L | Date | Tournament | Surface | Opponent | Score |
|---|---|---|---|---|---|---|
| Win | 1–0 | Jan 1978 | Sarasota, US | Carpet | (United States) Nick Saviano | 7–6, 0–6, 7–5 |
| Loss | 1–1 | Apr 1978 | Monte Carlo WCT, Monaco | Clay | (Mexico) Raúl Ramírez | 3–6, 3–6, 4–6 |
| Loss | 1–2 | Oct 1978 | Madrid, Spain | Clay | (Spain) José Higueras | 7–6, 3–6, 3–6, 4–6 |
| Win | 2–2 | Jul 1979 | Stuttgart Outdoor, Germany | Clay | (West Germany) Ulrich Pinner | 6–4, 6–0, 6–2 |
| Loss | 2–3 | Jul 1979 | Hilversum, Netherlands | Clay | (Hungary) Balázs Taróczy | 2–6, 2–6, 1–6 |
| Win | 3–3 | Mar 1980 | Stuttgart Indoor, Germany | Hard (i) | (United Kingdom) Mark Cox | 6–1, 6–3, 5–7, 1–6, 6–4 |
| Loss | 3–4 | Jun 1980 | Vienna, Austria | Clay | (Spain) Ángel Giménez | 6–1, ret. |
| Win | 4–4 | Nov 1980 | Bologna, Italy | Carpet | (Italy) Paolo Bertolucci | 7–5, 6–2 |
| Loss | 4–5 | Apr 1981 | Frankfurt, Germany | Carpet | (United States) John McEnroe | 2–6, 3–6 |
| Loss | 4–6 | Sep 1981 | Geneva, Switzerland | Clay | (Sweden) Björn Borg | 4–6, 3–6 |
| Win | 5–6 | Jan 1982 | Mexico City WCT, Mexico | Carpet | (United States) John Sadri | 3–6, 7–6, 4–6, 7–6, 6–2 |
| Loss | 5–7 | Mar 1982 | Munich-2 WCT, Germany | Carpet | (Czechoslovakia) Ivan Lendl | 6–3, 3–6, 1–6, 2–6 |
| Win | 6–7 | Aug 1982 | Cap d'Agde WCT, France | Clay | (United States) Lloyd Bourne | 6–3, 6–4, 5–7, 6–2 |
| Loss | 6–8 | Sep 1982 | Geneva, Switzerland | Clay | (Sweden) Mats Wilander | 5–7, 6–4, 4–6 |
| Loss | 6–9 | Dec 1982 | Toulouse, France | Hard (i) | (France) Yannick Noah | 3–6, 2–6 |
| Loss | 6–10 | Apr 1983 | Bournemouth, UK | Clay | (Spain) José Higueras | 6–2, 6–7, 5–7 |
| Win | 7–10 | May 1983 | Munich, Germany | Clay | (Sweden) Joakim Nyström | 6–0, 6–3, 4–6, 2–6, 7–5 |
| Loss | 7–11 | Jul 1983 | Gstaad, Switzerland | Clay | (United States) Sandy Mayer | 0–6, 3–6, 2–6 |
| Win | 8–11 | Jul 1983 | Hilversum, Netherlands | Clay | (Hungary) Balázs Taróczy | 6–4, 6–4 |
| Loss | 8–12 | Nov 1983 | Stockholm, Sweden | Hard (i) | (Sweden) Mats Wilander | 1–6, 5–7 |
| Loss | 8–13 | Mar 1984 | Madrid, Spain | Carpet | (United States) John McEnroe | 0–6, 4–6 |
| Loss | 8–14 | Apr 1984 | Luxembourg | Carpet | (Czechoslovakia) Ivan Lendl | 4–6, 4–6 |
| Loss | 8–15 | Jul 1984 | Hilversum, Netherlands | Clay | (Sweden) Anders Järryd | 3–6, 3–6, 6–2, 2–6 |
| Loss | 8–16 | Oct 1984 | Hong Kong | Hard | (Ecuador) Andrés Gómez | 3–6, 2–6 |
| Win | 9–16 | Sep 1985 | Geneva, Switzerland | Clay | (Sweden) Mats Wilander | 6–4, 6–4 |
| Loss | 9–17 | Oct 1985 | Toulouse, France | Hard (i) | (France) Yannick Noah | 4–6, 4–6 |
| Loss | 9–18 | Aug 1987 | Prague, Czechoslovakia | Clay | (Czechoslovakia) Marián Vajda | 1–6, 3–6 |
| Loss | 9–19 | Sep 1987 | Geneva, Switzerland | Clay | (Switzerland) Claudio Mezzadri | 4–6, 5–7 |

Source: ATP

=== Doubles: 103 (55 wins / 48 losses) ===
| Legend Grand Slam (2–1) Tennis Masters Cup (1–2) ATP Masters Series (1–0) Grand Prix (50–44) | Finals by surface Hard (10–4) Clay (32–28) Grass (0–0) Carpet (12–15) |

| Result | W-L | Year | Tournament | Surface | Partner | Opponents | Score |
|---|---|---|---|---|---|---|---|
| Win | 1–0 | Apr 1978 | Monte Carlo WCT, Monaco | Clay | (United States) Peter Fleming | (Chile) Jaime Fillol Sr. (Romania) Ilie Năstase | 6–4, 7–5 |
| Loss | 1–1 | Apr 1978 | Nice, France | Clay | (Czechoslovakia) Jan Kodeš | (France) Patrice Dominguez (France) François Jauffret | 4–6, 0–6 |
| Loss | 1–2 | May 1978 | Rome, Italy | Clay | (Czechoslovakia) Jan Kodeš | (Paraguay) Víctor Pecci (Chile) Belus Prajoux | 7–6, 6–7, 1–6 |
| Win | 2–2 | Jul 1978 | Stuttgart Outdoor, Germany | Clay | (Czechoslovakia) Jan Kodeš | (Brazil) Carlos Kirmayr (Chile) Belus Prajoux | 6–3, 7–6 |
| Loss | 2–3 | Oct 1978 | Aix-en-Provence, France | Clay | (Czechoslovakia) Jan Kodeš | (Romania) Ion Țiriac (Argentina) Guillermo Vilas | 6–7, 1–6 |
| Loss | 2–4 | Oct 1978 | Madrid, Spain | Clay | (Czechoslovakia) Pavel Složil | (Poland) Wojciech Fibak (Czechoslovakia) Jan Kodeš | 7–6, 1–6, 2–6 |
| Loss | 2–5 | Apr 1979 | Milan, Italy | Carpet (i) | (Argentina) José Luis Clerc | (United States) Peter Fleming (United States) John McEnroe | 1–6, 3–6 |
| Loss | 2–6 | Apr 1979 | Nice, France | Clay | (Czechoslovakia) Pavel Složil | (Australia) Paul McNamee (Australia) Peter McNamara | 1–6, 6–3, 2–6 |
| Win | 3–6 | May 1979 | Hamburg, Germany | Clay | (Czechoslovakia) Jan Kodeš | (Australia) Mark Edmondson (Australia) John Marks | 6–3, 6–1, 7–6 |
| Win | 4–6 | May 1979 | Rome, Italy | Clay | (United States) Peter Fleming | (Argentina) José Luis Clerc (Romania) Ilie Năstase | 4–6, 6–1, 7–5 |
| Loss | 4–7 | Jul 1979 | Hilversum, Netherlands | Clay | (Czechoslovakia) Jan Kodeš | (Netherlands) Tom Okker (Hungary) Balázs Taróczy | 1–6, 3–6 |
| Loss | 4–8 | Aug 1979 | Indianapolis, US | Clay | (Czechoslovakia) Jan Kodeš | (United States) Gene Mayer (United States) John McEnroe | 4–6, 6–7 |
| Loss | 4–9 | Nov 1979 | Wembley, UK | Carpet (i) | (United States) Stan Smith | (United States) Peter Fleming (United States) John McEnroe | 2–6, 3–6 |
| Win | 5–9 | Nov 1979 | Buenos Aires, Argentina | Clay | (United States) Sherwood Stewart | (Brazil) Marcos Hocevar (Brazil) João Soares | 6–1, 7–5 |
| Loss | 5–10 | Mar 1980 | Memphis, US | Carpet (i) | (Australia) Rod Frawley | (United States) Brian Gottfried (United States) John McEnroe | 3–6, 7–6, 6–7 |
| Win | 6–10 | Mar 1980 | Stuttgart Indoor, Germany | Hard (i) | (Poland) Wojciech Fibak | (United States) Tim Mayotte (United States) Larry Stefanki | 6–4, 7–6 |
| Loss | 6–11 | Jun 1980 | Vienna, Austria | Clay | (Czechoslovakia) Pavel Složil | (Italy) Gianni Ocleppo (France) Christophe Roger-Vasselin | def. |
| Loss | 6–12 | Nov 1980 | Cologne, Germany | Hard (i) | (Czechoslovakia) Jan Kodeš | (South Africa) Bernard Mitton (Rhodesia) Andrew Pattison | 4–6, 1–6 |
| Loss | 6–13 | Apr 1981 | Monte Carlo, Monaco | Clay | (Czechoslovakia) Pavel Složil | (Switzerland) Heinz Günthardt (Hungary) Balázs Taróczy | 3–6, 3–6 |
| Loss | 6–14 | Apr 1981 | Bournemouth, UK | Clay | (United Kingdom) Buster Mottram | (Argentina) Ricardo Cano (Paraguay) Víctor Pecci | 4–6, 6–3, 3–6 |
| Loss | 6–15 | May 1981 | Rome, Italy | Clay | (United States) Bruce Manson | (Chile) Hans Gildemeister (Ecuador) Andrés Gómez | 5–7, 2–6 |
| Loss | 6–16 | Sep 1981 | Geneva, Switzerland | Clay | (Czechoslovakia) Pavel Složil | (Switzerland) Heinz Günthardt (Hungary) Balázs Taróczy | 4–6, 6–3, 2–6 |
| Loss | 6–17 | Oct 1981 | Madrid, Spain | Clay | (Switzerland) Heinz Günthardt | (Chile) Hans Gildemeister (Ecuador) Andrés Gómez | 2–6, 6–3, 3–6 |
| Loss | 6–18 | Nov 1981 | Bologna, Italy | Carpet | (Hungary) Balázs Taróczy | (United States) Sammy Giammalva Jr. (France) Henri Leconte | 6–7, 4–6 |
| Loss | 6–19 | Jan 1982 | Mexico City WCT, Mexico | Carpet | (Hungary) Balázs Taróczy | (United States) Sherwood Stewart (United States) Ferdi Taygan | 4–6, 5–7 |
| Loss | 6–20 | Jan 1982 | Delray Beach WCT, US | Clay | (Hungary) Balázs Taróczy | (United States) Mel Purcell (United States) Eliot Teltscher | 4–6, 6–7 |
| Win | 7–20 | Feb 1982 | Genova WCT, Italy | Carpet (i) | (Czechoslovakia) Pavel Složil | (United States) Mike Cahill (United Kingdom) Buster Mottram | 6–7, 7–5, 6–3 |
| Win | 8–20 | Mar 1982 | Munich-2 WCT, Germany | Carpet (i) | (Australia) Mark Edmondson | (South Africa) Kevin Curren (United States) Steve Denton | 4–6, 7–5, 6–2 |
| Win | 9–20 | May 1982 | Madrid, Spain | Clay | (Czechoslovakia) Pavel Složil | (Switzerland) Heinz Günthardt (Hungary) Balázs Taróczy | 6–1, 3–6, 9–7 |
| Win | 10–20 | May 1982 | Hamburg, Germany | Clay | (Czechoslovakia) Pavel Složil | (Sweden) Anders Järryd (Sweden) Hans Simonsson | 6–4, 6–3 |
| Win | 11–20 | Jul 1982 | Hilversum, Netherlands | Clay | (Czechoslovakia) Jan Kodeš | (Switzerland) Heinz Günthardt (Hungary) Balázs Taróczy | 7–6, 6–4 |
| Loss | 11–21 | Jul 1982 | Cap d'Agde WCT, France | Clay | (Czechoslovakia) Pavel Složil | (United States) Andy Andrews (United States) Drew Gitlin | 2–6, 4–6 |
| Win | 12–21 | Sep 1982 | Geneva, Switzerland | Clay | (Czechoslovakia) Pavel Složil | (Australia) Carl Limberger (South Africa) Mike Myburg | 6–4, 6–0 |
| Win | 13–21 | Oct 1982 | Amsterdam, Netherlands | Carpet (i) | (United States) Fritz Buehning | (South Africa) Kevin Curren (United Kingdom) Buster Mottram | 4–6, 6–3, 6–0 |
| Loss | 13–22 | Nov 1982 | Wembley, UK | Carpet (i) | (Switzerland) Heinz Günthardt | (United States) Peter Fleming (United States) John McEnroe | 6–7, 4–6 |
| Win | 14–22 | Nov 1982 | Dortmund WCT, Germany | Carpet (i) | (Czechoslovakia) Pavel Složil | (United States) Mike Cahill (Paraguay) Franciso González | 6–2, 6–7, 6–1 |
| Win | 15–22 | Dec 1982 | Toulouse, France | Hard (i) | (Czechoslovakia) Pavel Složil | (France) Jean-Louis Haillet (France) Yannick Noah | 6–4, 6–4 |
| Win | 16–22 | Jan 1983 | Guarujá, Brazil | Hard | (United States) Tim Gullikson | (Israel) Shlomo Glickstein (United States) Van Winitsky | 5–7, 7–6, 6–3 |
| Win | 17–22 | Feb 1983 | Richmond WCT, US | Carpet (i) | (Czechoslovakia) Pavel Složil | (United States) Fritz Buehning (United States) Brian Teacher | 6–2, 6–4 |
| Win | 18–22 | Feb 1983 | Delray Beach WCT, US | Clay | (Czechoslovakia) Pavel Složil | (India) Anand Amritraj (United States) Johan Kriek | 7–6, 6–4 |
| Win | 19–22 | Mar 1983 | Milan, Italy | Carpet (i) | (Czechoslovakia) Pavel Složil | (United States) Fritz Buehning (United States) Peter Fleming | 6–2, 5–7, 6–4 |
| Loss | 19–23 | Apr 1983 | Houston WCT, US | Clay | (United States) Mark Dickson | (South Africa) Kevin Curren (United States) Steve Denton | 6–7, 7–6, 1–6 |
| Win | 20–23 | Apr 1983 | Bournemouth, UK | Clay | (United States) Sherwood Stewart | (Switzerland) Heinz Günthardt (Hungary) Balázs Taróczy | 7–6, 7–5 |
| Loss | 20–24 | May 1983 | Munich, Germany | Clay | (Sweden) Anders Järryd | (New Zealand) Chris Lewis (Czechoslovakia) Pavel Složil | 4–6, 2–6 |
| Win | 21–24 | Jul 1983 | Gstaad, Switzerland | Clay | (Czechoslovakia) Pavel Složil | (United Kingdom) Colin Dowdeswell (Poland) Wojciech Fibak | 6–7, 6–4, 6–2 |
| Loss | 21–25 | Jul 1983 | Stuttgart Outdoor, Germany | Clay | (Czechoslovakia) Pavel Složil | (India) Anand Amritraj (United States) Mike Bauer | 6–4, 3–6, 2–6 |
| Loss | 21–26 | Jul 1983 | Hilversum, Netherlands | Clay | (Czechoslovakia) Jan Kodeš | (Switzerland) Heinz Günthardt (Hungary) Balázs Taróczy | 6–3, 2–6, 3–6 |
| Win | 22–26 | Oct 1983 | Basel, Switzerland | Hard (i) | (Czechoslovakia) Pavel Složil | (Sweden) Stefan Edberg (Romania) Florin Segărceanu | 6–1, 3–6, 7–6 |
| Win | 23–26 | Jan 1984 | Masters Doubles WCT, London | Carpet (i) | (Czechoslovakia) Pavel Složil | (Sweden) Anders Järryd (Sweden) Hans Simonsson | 6–1, 3–6, 6–3, 4–6, 3–6 |
| Loss | 23–27 | Feb 1984 | Memphis, US | Carpet (i) | (Switzerland) Heinz Günthardt | (United States) Fritz Buehning (United States) Peter Fleming | 3–6, 0–6 |
| Win | 24–27 | Mar 1984 | Milan, Italy | Carpet (i) | (Czechoslovakia) Pavel Složil | (South Africa) Kevin Curren (United States) Steve Denton | 6–4, 6–3 |
| Win | 25–27 | Apr 1984 | Kockelscheuer, Luxembourg | Carpet (i) | (Sweden) Anders Järryd | (Australia) Mark Edmondson (United States) Sherwood Stewart | 6–3, 7–5 |
| Loss | 25–28 | Jun 1984 | French Open, Paris | Clay | (Czechoslovakia) Pavel Složil | (France) Henri Leconte (France) Yannick Noah | 4–6, 6–2, 6–3, 3–6, 2–6 |
| Win | 26–28 | Jul 1984 | Hilversum, Netherlands | Clay | (Sweden) Anders Järryd | (Australia) Broderick Dyke (Australia) Michael Fancutt | 6–4, 5–7, 7–6 |
| Win | 27–28 | Aug 1984 | North Conway, US | Clay | (United States) Brian Gottfried | (Brazil) Cássio Motta (United States) Blaine Willenborg | 6–4, 6–2 |
| Win | 28–28 | Sep 1984 | US Open, New York City | Hard | (Australia) John Fitzgerald | (Sweden) Stefan Edberg (Sweden) Anders Järryd | 7–6, 6–3, 6–3 |
| Win | 29–28 | Sep 1984 | Palermo, Italy | Clay | (United States) Blaine Willenborg | (Italy) Adriano Panatta (Sweden) Henrik Sundström | 6–7, 6–3, 6–0 |
| Loss | 29–29 | Sep 1984 | Geneva, Switzerland | Clay | (Czechoslovakia) Libor Pimek | (Denmark) Michael Mortensen (Sweden) Mats Wilander | 1–6, 6–3, 5–7 |
| Win | 30–29 | Oct 1984 | Barcelona, Spain | Clay | (Czechoslovakia) Pavel Složil | (Argentina) Martín Jaite (Paraguay) Víctor Pecci | 6–2, 6–0 |
| Win | 31–29 | Oct 1984 | Basel, Switzerland | Hard (i) | (Czechoslovakia) Pavel Složil | (Sweden) Stefan Edberg (United States) Tim Wilkison | 7–6, 6–2 |
| Win | 32–29 | Nov 1984 | Stockholm, Sweden | Hard (i) | (France) Henri Leconte | (India) Vijay Amritraj (Romania) Ilie Năstase | 3–6, 7–6, 6–4 |
| Loss | 32–30 | Nov 1984 | Wembley, UK | Carpet (i) | (Czechoslovakia) Pavel Složil | (Ecuador) Andrés Gómez (Czechoslovakia) Ivan Lendl | 2–6, 2–6 |
| Loss | 32–31 | 1984 | Masters, New York | Carpet (i) | (Czechoslovakia) Pavel Složil | (United States) Peter Fleming (United States) John McEnroe | 2–6, 2–6 |
| Win | 33. | 1985 | Memphis, US | Carpet (i) | (Czechoslovakia) Pavel Složil | (South Africa) Kevin Curren (United States) Steve Denton | 1–6, 6–3, 6–4 |
| Win | 34. | 1985 | Rotterdam, Netherlands | Carpet (i) | (Czechoslovakia) Pavel Složil | (United States) Vitas Gerulaitis (Australia) Paul McNamee | 6–4, 6–4 |
| Win | 35. | 1985 | Monte Carlo, Monaco | Clay | (Czechoslovakia) Pavel Složil | (Israel) Shlomo Glickstein (Israel) Shahar Perkiss | 6–2, 6–3 |
| Loss | 32. | 1985 | Atlanta, US | Carpet (i) | (United States) Steve Denton | (United States) Paul Annacone (South Africa) Christo van Rensburg | 4–6, 3–6 |
| Win | 36. | 1985 | Gstaad, Switzerland | Clay | (Poland) Wojciech Fibak | (Australia) Brad Drewett (Australia) Mark Edmondson | 6–7, 6–4, 6–4 |
| Win | 37. | 1985 | Stuttgart Outdoor, Germany | Clay | (Czechoslovakia) Ivan Lendl | (United States) Andy Kohlberg (Brazil) João Soares | 3–6, 6–4, 6–2 |
| Loss | 33. | 1985 | Toulouse, France | Hard (i) | (Czechoslovakia) Pavel Složil | (Chile) Ricardo Acuña (Switzerland) Jakob Hlasek | 6–3, 2–6, 7–9 |
| Loss | 34. | 1985 | Hong Kong | Hard | (Switzerland) Jakob Hlasek | (Australia) Brad Drewett (Australia) Kim Warwick | 3–6, 6–4, 2–6 |
| Loss | 35. | 1986 | Brussels, Belgium | Carpet (i) | (Australia) John Fitzgerald | (West Germany) Boris Becker (Socialist Federal Republic of Yugoslavia) Slobodan Živojinović | 6–7, 5–7 |
| Win | 38. | 1986 | Bari, Italy | Clay | (United States) Gary Donnelly | (Spain) Sergio Casal (Spain) Emilio Sánchez | 2–6, 6–4, 6–4 |
| Win | 39. | 1986 | French Open, Paris | Clay | (Australia) John Fitzgerald | (Sweden) Stefan Edberg (Sweden) Anders Järryd | 6–3, 4–6, 6–3, 6–7, 14–12 |
| Win | 40. | 1986 | Hilversum, Netherlands | Clay | (Czechoslovakia) Miloslav Mečíř | (Netherlands) Tom Nijssen (Netherlands) Johan Vekemans | 6–4, 6–2 |
| Win | 41. | 1986 | Kitzbühel, Austria | Clay | (Switzerland) Heinz Günthardt | (Chile) Hans Gildemeister (Ecuador) Andrés Gómez | 4–6, 6–3, 7–6 |
| Win | 42. | 1986 | Toulouse, France | Hard (i) | (Czechoslovakia) Miloslav Mečíř | (Switzerland) Jakob Hlasek (Czechoslovakia) Pavel Složil | 6–2, 3–6, 6–4 |
| Loss | 36. | 1986 | Basel, Switzerland | Hard (i) | (Sweden) Jan Gunnarsson | (France) Guy Forget (France) Yannick Noah | 6–7, 4–6 |
| Win | 43. | 1987 | Hamburg, Germany | Clay | (Czechoslovakia) Miloslav Mečíř | (Switzerland) Claudio Mezzadri (United States) Jim Pugh | 4–6, 7–6, 6–2 |
| Loss | 37. | 1987 | Rome, Italy | Clay | (Czechoslovakia) Miloslav Mečíř | (France) Guy Forget (France) Yannick Noah | 2–6, 7–6, 3–6 |
| Win | 44. | 1987 | Gstaad, Switzerland | Clay | (Sweden) Jan Gunnarsson | (France) Loïc Courteau (France) Guy Forget | 7–6, 6–2 |
| Loss | 38. | 1987 | Kitzbühel, Austria | Clay | (Czechoslovakia) Miloslav Mečíř | (Spain) Sergio Casal (Spain) Emilio Sánchez | 6–7, 6–7 |
| Win | 45. | 1987 | Prague, Czechoslovakia | Clay | (Czechoslovakia) Miloslav Mečíř | (Czechoslovakia) Stanislav Birner (Czechoslovakia) Jaroslav Navrátil | 6–3, 6–7, 6–3 |
| Win | 46. | 1987 | Barcelona, Spain | Clay | (Czechoslovakia) Miloslav Mečíř | (Argentina) Javier Frana (Argentina) Christian Miniussi | 6–1, 6–2 |
| Loss | 39. | 1987 | Palermo, Italy | Clay | (Czechoslovakia) Petr Korda | (Mexico) Leonardo Lavalle (Italy) Claudio Panatta | 6–3, 4–6, 4–6 |
| Win | 47. | 1987 | Basel, Switzerland | Hard (i) | (Sweden) Anders Järryd | (Czechoslovakia) Stanislav Birner (Czechoslovakia) Jaroslav Navrátil | 6–4, 6–3 |
| Win | 48. | 1987 | Wembley, UK | Carpet (i) | (Czechoslovakia) Miloslav Mečíř | (United States) Ken Flach (United States) Robert Seguso | 7–5, 6–4 |
| Win | 49. | 1987 | Masters Cup, London | Carpet (i) | (Czechoslovakia) Miloslav Mečíř | (United States) Ken Flach (United States) Robert Seguso | 6–4, 7–5, 6–7, 6–3 |
| Loss | 40. | 1988 | Milan, Italy | Carpet (i) | (Czechoslovakia) Miloslav Mečíř | (West Germany) Boris Becker (West Germany) Eric Jelen | 3–6, 3–6 |
| Loss | 41. | 1988 | Rome, Italy | Clay | (Sweden) Anders Järryd | (Mexico) Jorge Lozano (United States) Todd Witsken | 3–6, 3–6 |
| Win | 50. | 1988 | Geneva, Switzerland | Clay | (Iran) Mansour Bahrami | (Argentina) Gustavo Luza (Argentina) Guillermo Pérez Roldán | 6–4, 6–3 |
| Win | 51. | 1988 | Basel, Switzerland | Hard (i) | (Switzerland) Jakob Hlasek | (United Kingdom) Jeremy Bates (Sweden) Peter Lundgren | 6–3, 6–1 |
| Loss | 42. | 1988 | Vienna, Austria | Carpet | (United States) Kevin Curren | (Austria) Alex Antonitsch (Hungary) Balázs Taróczy | 6–4, 3–6, 6–7 |
| Loss | 43. | 1988 | Brussels, Belgium | Carpet | (Australia) John Fitzgerald | (Australia) Wally Masur (Netherlands) Tom Nijssen | 5–7, 6–7 |
| Win | 52. | 1989 | Athens, Greece | Clay | (Italy) Claudio Panatta | (Argentina) Gustavo Giussani (Argentina) Gerardo Mirad | 6–3, 6–2 |
| Win | 53. | 1989 | Monte Carlo, Monaco | Clay | (Australia) Mark Woodforde | (Italy) Paolo Canè (Italy) Diego Nargiso | 1–6, 6–4, 6–2 |
| Win | 54. | 1989 | Stuttgart Outdoor, Germany | Clay | (Czechoslovakia) Petr Korda | (Romania) Florin Segărceanu (Czechoslovakia) Cyril Suk | 6–3, 6–4 |
| Loss | 44. | 1989 | Kitzbühel, Austria | Clay | (Czechoslovakia) Petr Korda | (Spain) Emilio Sánchez (Spain) Javier Sánchez | 5–7, 6–7 |
| Loss | 45. | 1989 | Prague, Czechoslovakia | Clay | (Czechoslovakia) Petr Korda | (Spain) Jordi Arrese (Austria) Horst Skoff | 4–6, 4–6 |
| Loss | 46. | 1989 | Madrid, Spain | Clay | (Spain) Francisco Clavet | (Spain) Carlos Costa (Spain) Tomás Carbonell | 5–7, 3–6 |
| Loss | 47. | 1989 | Barcelona, Spain | Clay | (Spain) Sergio Casal | (Argentina) Gustavo Luza (Argentina) Christian Miniussi | 3–6, 3–6 |
| Win | 55. | 1990 | Monte Carlo, Monaco | Clay | (Czechoslovakia) Petr Korda | (Ecuador) Andrés Gómez (Spain) Javier Sánchez | 6–4, 7–6 |
| Loss | 48. | 1990 | Munich, Germany | Clay | (Czechoslovakia) Petr Korda | (West Germany) Udo Riglewski (West Germany) Michael Stich | 1–6, 4–6 |

Source: ATP
