= Henrik Sundström =

Swedish tennis player (born 1964)

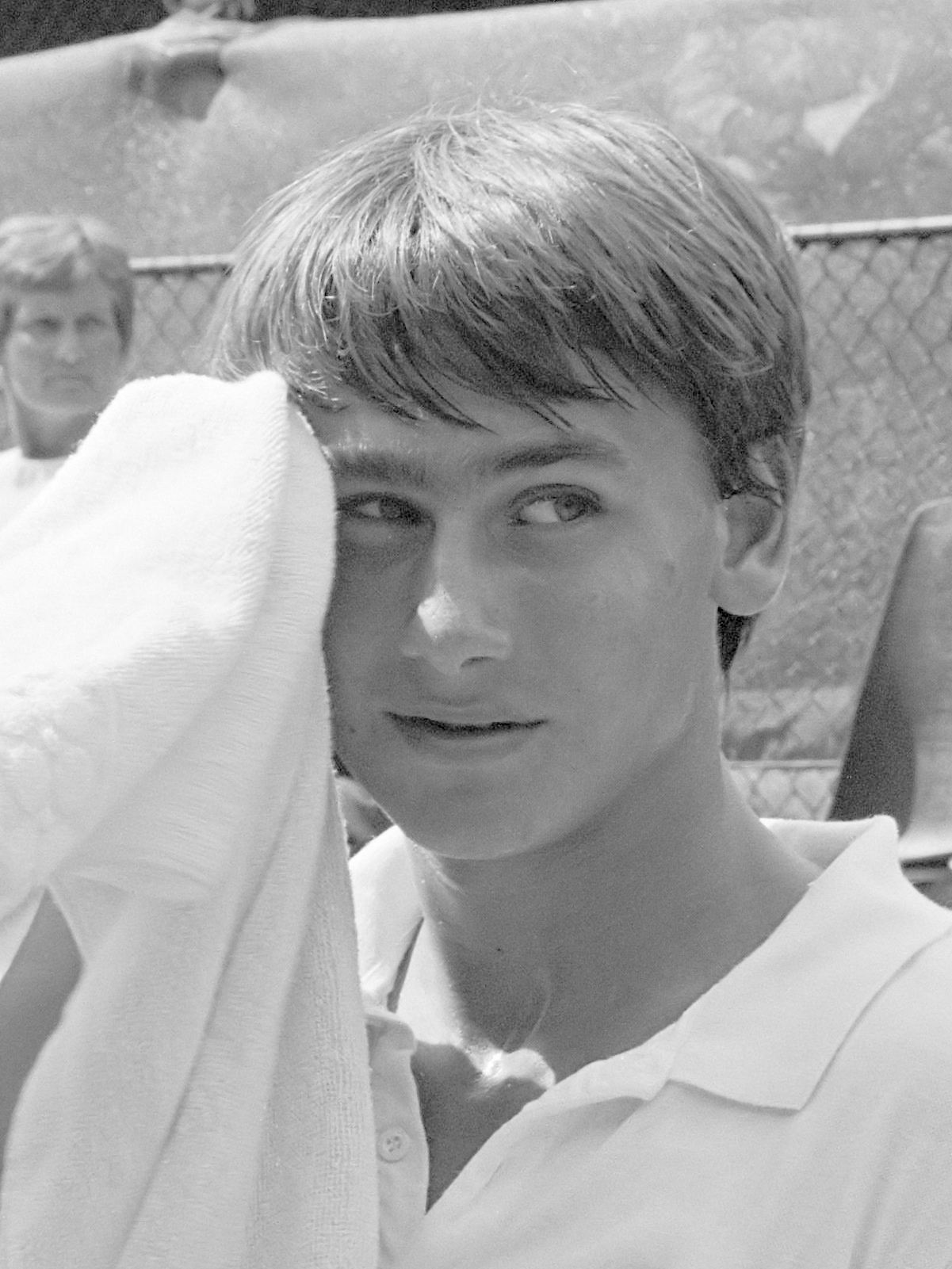
- Henrik Sundström (July 1982)
- Country (sports): Sweden
- Residence: Monte Carlo, Monaco
- Born: 29 February 1964 (age 62) Lund, Sweden
- Height: 1.88 m (6 ft 2 in)
- Turned pro: 1981
- Retired: 1989
- Plays: Right-handed (one-handed backhand)
- Prize money: $819,393

Singles
- Career record: 154–109
- Career titles: 5
- Highest ranking: No. 6 (8 October 1984)

Grand Slam singles results
- Australian Open: 2R (1982, 1983, 1985)
- French Open: QF (1984)
- Wimbledon: 3R (1983)
- US Open: 4R (1984)

Doubles
- Career record: 25–37
- Career titles: 0
- Highest ranking: No. 99 (29 October 1984)

Henrik Sundström (born 29 February 1964) is a former professional male tennis player from Sweden. He is nicknamed Henke. Sundström was at his best on clay and achieved his strongest results on this surface, with his solid and heavy topspin groundstrokes from the baseline. He reached a career-high singles ranking of World No. 6.

== Tennis career ==
Sundström turned professional in 1981 and in 1982 he went on to make his first final at the Swedish Open in Båstad losing to countryman and reigning French Open champion Mats Wilander.

In 1983 Sundström won his first ATP title in Nice over Manuel Orantes and made the final of Madrid, losing to Yannick Noah who later went on to win the French Open that year. Sundström also made his Davis Cup debut against New Zealand in the quarter-finals played at Eastbourne on grass. He lost both of his matches, but Sweden still won the tie and make the final that year against Australia.

1984 was the best year of Sundström's career as he compiled a record of 54–21. In 3 weeks between 2 April and 22 April he won 14 out 15 matches, winning titles in Bari over Pedro Rebolledo without losing a set, and proceeded to make the final in Nice also without losing a set before losing to Andrés Gómez. He then won the biggest tournament of his career, the Monte Carlo Open, against Mats Wilander. After victory Sundström made the final of the German Open in Hamburg defeating Mats Wilander again on the way before losing a 5 set match against Juan Aguilera. He then made it to the quarterfinals at the French Open by defeating Álvaro Fillol, Joakim Nyström, Hans Gildemeister and Francesco Cancellotti, before being defeated by Jimmy Connors.

After the French Open Sundström won the title in Båstad and made the final of Geneva, losing to Aaron Krickstein.

Sundström competed for the victorious Swedish Davis Cup team that year. He came into the Swedish team in the quarterfinals and composed a 6–0 record in singles for the year. All of these matches were on clay; his opponents included the reigning French Open champion Ivan Lendl who was still playing for Czechoslovakia at the time. Sundström turned around a 2-sets-to-love and 0–3 (0–40) deficit in the third set, and won the match in 5, which gave the Swedes the edge and they made the final against the United States. The US team included John McEnroe who had lost only 2 matches for the season, Jimmy Connors, and Peter Fleming, John McEnroe's long-term doubles partner.

Mats Wilander defeated Jimmy Connors in the first match, and Sundström faced McEnroe in the second match. He defeated John McEnroe in straight sets 13–11 6–4, 6–3 to inflict his third defeat for 1984. This match turned the Davis Cup final in the Swedes' favor and they won the Davis Cup by taking the doubles as well. Sundström also won his second singles match against Jimmy Arias, but Sweden had already clinched the Davis Cup by taking an unassailable 3–0 lead.

Sundström never reached the same heights again after 1984. He played Davis Cup only once more after that and he only won one more title in 1986 at Athens, defeating Francisco Maciel. Sundström had injury problems with his back and retired in 1989 after playing only 21 matches in 3 years.

Sundström now lives in Monaco where he works. He has two children.

== Career finals ==
=== Singles: 13 (5 wins, 8 losses) ===
Legend (singles)
Grand Slam (0)
Tennis Masters Cup (0)
ATP Masters Series (0)
ATP Tour (5)

| Result | W/L | Date | Tournament | Surface | Opponent | Score |
|---|---|---|---|---|---|---|
| Loss | 0–1 | Jul 1982 | Båstad, Sweden | Clay | (Sweden) Mats Wilander | 4–6, 4–6 |
| Win | 1–1 | Mar 1983 | Nice, France | Clay | (Spain) Manuel Orantes | 7–5, 4–6, 6–3 |
| Loss | 1–2 | Apr 1983 | Madrid, Spain | Clay | (France) Yannick Noah | 6–3, 0–6, 2–6, 4–6 |
| Loss | 1–3 | Sep 1983 | Geneva, Switzerland | Clay | (Sweden) Mats Wilander | 6–3, 1–6, 3–6 |
| Win | 2–3 | Apr 1984 | Bari, Italy | Clay | (Chile) Pedro Rebolledo | 7–5, 6–4 |
| Loss | 2–4 | Apr 1984 | Nice, France | Clay | (Ecuador) Andrés Gómez | 1–6, 4–6 |
| Win | 3–4 | Apr 1984 | Monte Carlo, Monaco | Clay | (Sweden) Mats Wilander | 6–3, 7–5, 6–2 |
| Loss | 3–5 | May 1984 | Hamburg, West Germany | Clay | (Spain) Juan Aguilera | 4–6, 6–2, 6–2, 4–6, 4–6 |
| Win | 4–5 | Jul 1984 | Båstad, Sweden | Clay | (Sweden) Anders Järryd | 3–6, 7–5, 6–3 |
| Loss | 4–6 | Sep 1984 | Geneva, Switzerland | Clay | (United States) Aaron Krickstein | 7–6, 1–6, 4–6 |
| Loss | 4–7 | Apr 1985 | Hamburg, West Germany | Clay | (Czechoslovakia) Miloslav Mečíř | 4–6, 1–6, 4–6 |
| Loss | 4–8 | May 1986 | Florence, Italy | Clay | (Ecuador) Andrés Gómez | 3–6, 4–6 |
| Win | 5–8 | Jun 1986 | Athens, Greece | Clay | (Mexico) Francisco Maciel | 6-0, 7-5 |

== Performance Timeline ==
| Tournament | 1981 | 1982 | 1983 | 1984 | 1985 | 1986 | 1987 | 1988 | 1989 |
|---|---|---|---|---|---|---|---|---|---|
| Australian Open | A | 2R | 2R | A | 2R | NH | A | 1R | A |
| French Open | A | A | 4R | QF | 4R | 2R | 3R | A | A |
| Wimbledon | A | 1R | 3R | 2R | 1R | 1R | 1R | A | A |
| US Open | A | 2R | 1R | 4R | 1R | 1R | 1R | A | A |
