= Peter Gojowczyk =

German tennis player

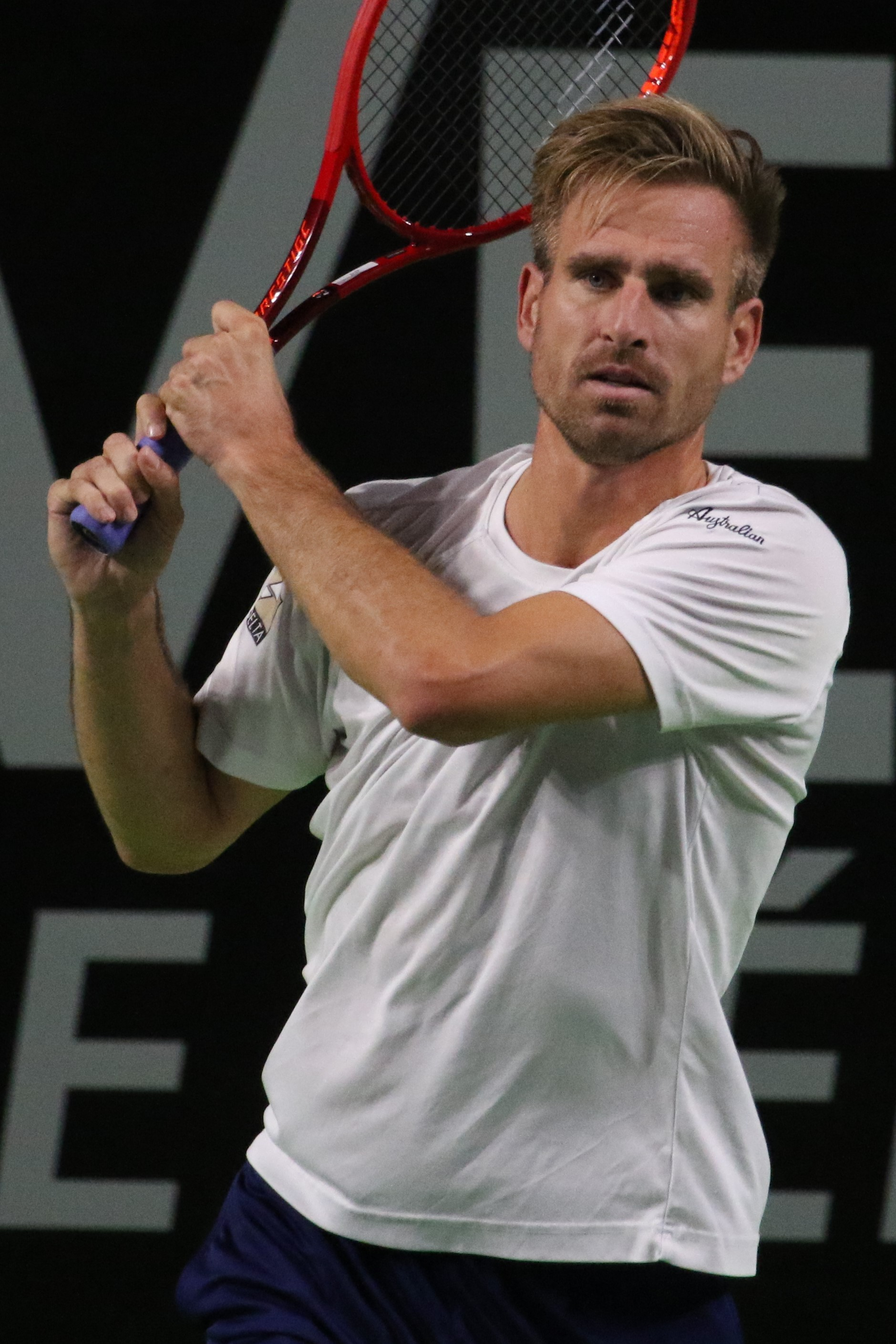
- Gojowczyk at the 2021 Internationaux de Tennis de Vendée
- Full name: Peter Gojowczyk
- Country (sports): Germany
- Residence: Eisenhofen, Germany
- Born: 15 July 1989 (age 36) Dachau, West Germany
- Height: 1.88 m (6 ft 2 in)
- Turned pro: 2006
- Retired: 2023
- Plays: Right-handed (two-handed backhand)
- Prize money: US$3,771,631

Singles
- Career record: 75–99
- Career titles: 1
- Highest ranking: No. 39 (25 June 2018)

Grand Slam singles results
- Australian Open: 2R (2018, 2020)
- French Open: 1R (2018, 2019, 2021, 2022)
- Wimbledon: 2R (2017)
- US Open: 4R (2021)

Doubles
- Career record: 6–17
- Career titles: 0
- Highest ranking: No. 348 (1 April 2019)

Grand Slam doubles results
- Australian Open: 1R (2015, 2018, 2019)
- Wimbledon: 1R (2018)
- US Open: 1R (2018)

Team competitions
- Davis Cup: SF (2021)

Peter Gojowczyk (/ɡoʊˈjoʊvtʃɪk/ goh-YOHV-chik; born 15 July 1989) is a German former professional tennis player. He achieved a career-high ATP singles ranking of world No. 39 in June 2018. He won one ATP singles title and reached two more finals.

== Tennis career ==
=== 2012: Grand Slam debut ===
He qualified for his first Grand Slam main draw at the 2012 Australian Open.

=== 2014: Cracking the top 100 ===
Gojowczyk began the year by reaching his first tour-level semifinal at Doha as a qualifier, defeating sixth seed and countryman Philipp Kohlschreiber en route, before losing to Rafael Nadal in three sets (taking the first).

After qualifying at the Australian Open, he broke into the top 100 for the first time in his career.

In April, he defeated Jo-Wilfried Tsonga in five sets in a Davis Cup World Group quarterfinal tie.

In June, Gojowczyk reached the quarterfinals of Halle, defeating world No. 9 Milos Raonic in straight sets in the second round. In August at the US Open, he defeated Benjamin Becker in straight sets in the first round. He ended the year ranked as world No. 79.

=== 2017: Maiden ATP 250 title ===
Gojowczyk qualified for and then reached the second round of Wimbledon for the first time in his career at the Wimbledon Championships, defeating Marius Copil in the first round. He then lost to 18th seed Roberto Bautista Agut. Carrying his good form into the following week, Gojowczyk reached the semifinals in Newport.

In September, he won his maiden ATP title at the Moselle Open in Metz as a qualifier, defeating Benoît Paire in straight sets in the final.

=== 2018: Best season: Two ATP finals, top 40 career-high ranking ===
Gojowczyk was runner-up at the Delray Beach Open. As a result, he reached the top 50 on 5 March 2018. He was also a finalist at the Geneva Open and reached a career-high ranking of world No. 39 on 25 June 2018.

=== 2019–2020: Struggles with form, out of Top 100 ===
Gojowczyk's results during 2019 and 2020 did not match the highs of the 2018 season.

As a lucky loser he reached the semifinals of the 2019 Washington Open losing to third seed Daniil Medvedev.

At the 2020 Australian Open, he qualified and reached the second round for the second time at this Major defeating Christopher Eubanks. He lost to 27th seed Pablo Carreño Busta.

=== 2021: Second best season: US Open fourth round, return to Top 100 ===
Ranked world No. 141, Gojowczyk qualified for the main draw at the US Open to make his fifth appearance in the main draw. He reached beyond the second round of a Grand Slam for the first time in his career defeating 23rd seed Ugo Humbert and Dušan Lajović both matches in five sets. He went on to reach the fourth round of a Major for the first time in his career defeating fellow qualifier Henri Laaksonen in four sets. He lost in the round of 16 to Carlos Alcaraz in a five-set match 7–5, 1–6, 7–5, 2–6, 0–6. As a result, he climbed 40 spots in the rankings to No. 101 on 13 September 2021.

At the 2021 Moselle Open in Metz, he made the quarterfinals and semifinals again as a qualifier, defeating seventh seed Karen Khachanov and Marcos Giron to reach his third tour-level quarterfinal and second semifinal of the season respectively after Montpellier and Newport. With this run he returned to the Top 100 at World No. 88 on 27 September 2021.

=== 2022–2023: Second ATP 500-level quarterfinal, retirement ===
In 2022, as a lucky loser, Gojowcyk made the quarterfinals in Acapulco, defeating Brandon Nakashima in the first round and advancing after his second round opponent, defending champion Alexander Zverev was defaulted from the tournament due to unsportsmanlike conduct in his doubles match. In the quarterfinals he lost to Cam Norrie in straight sets. He fell out of the top 300 on 27 February 2023 to No. 333.

Gojowcyk announced his retirement from professional tennis on 5 November 2023, after losing in the first qualifying round of the Moselle Open, the place where he won his only title on the ATP Tour.

== Performance timelines ==
Key
W	F	SF	QF	#R	RR	Q#	P#	DNQ	A	Z#	PO	G	S	B	NMS	NTI	P	NH

(W) winner; (F) finalist; (SF) semifinalist; (QF) quarterfinalist; (#R) rounds 4, 3, 2, 1; (RR) round-robin stage; (Q#) qualification round; (P#) preliminary round; (DNQ) did not qualify; (A) absent; (Z#) Davis/Fed Cup Zonal Group (with number indication) or (PO) play-off; (G) gold, (S) silver or (B) bronze Olympic/Paralympic medal; (NMS) not a Masters tournament; (NTI) not a Tier I tournament; (P) postponed; (NH) not held; (SR) strike rate (events won / competed); (W–L) win–loss record.
To avoid confusion and double counting, these charts are updated at the conclusion of a tournament or when the player's participation has ended.

=== Singles ===
Tournament	2006	2007	2008	2009	2010	2011	2012	2013	2014	2015	2016	2017	2018	2019	2020	2021	2022	2023	SR	W–L	Win %
Grand Slam tournaments
Australian Open	A	A	A	A	A	A	1R	Q1	1R	1R	1R	Q2	2R	1R	2R	Q1	1R	Q3	0 / 8	2–8	20%
French Open	A	A	A	A	A	A	Q3	Q1	Q2	Q1	Q3	Q3	1R	1R	Q1	1R	1R	A	0 / 4	0–4	0%
Wimbledon	A	A	A	A	A	A	Q1	Q2	Q1	Q1	Q1	2R	1R	1R	NH	Q1	1R	A	0 / 4	1–4	20%
US Open	A	A	A	A	A	A	Q3	2R	2R	Q3	Q1	Q3	1R	Q1	1R	4R	1R	A	0 / 6	5–6	45%
Win–loss	0–0	0–0	0–0	0–0	0–0	0–0	0–1	1–1	1–2	0–1	0–1	1–1	1–4	0–3	1–2	3–2	0–4	0–0	0 / 22	8–22	27%
National representation
Davis Cup	A	A	A	A	A	A	A	A	QF	A	A	A	A	A	A	SF	A	A	0 / 2	1–2	33%
ATP Tour Masters 1000
Indian Wells Masters	A	A	A	A	A	A	Q1	A	A	A	A	2R	1R	2R	NH	A	A	A	0 / 3	2–3	40%
Miami Open	A	A	A	A	A	A	A	A	Q1	A	A	Q1	1R	1R	NH	A	Q2	A	0 / 2	0–2	0%
Monte-Carlo Masters	A	A	A	A	A	A	A	A	A	A	A	A	1R	Q1	NH	A	A	A	0 / 1	0–1	0%
Madrid Open	A	A	A	A	A	A	A	A	A	A	A	A	1R	A	NH	A	A	A	0 / 1	0–1	0%
Italian Open	A	A	A	A	A	A	A	A	A	A	A	A	3R	Q1	A	A	A	A	0 / 1	2–1	67%
Canadian Open	A	A	A	A	A	A	A	A	A	A	A	A	1R	1R	NH	A	A	A	0 / 2	0–2	0%
Cincinnati Masters	A	A	A	A	A	A	A	A	A	A	A	A	2R	A	A	A	A	A	0 / 1	1–1	50%
Shanghai Masters	not held			A	A	A	A	A	Q2	A	A	Q1	3R	Q1	not held			A	0 / 1	2–1	67%
Paris Masters	A	A	A	A	A	A	A	A	A	A	A	2R	1R	A	A	Q1	A	A	0 / 2	1–2	33%
Win–loss	0–0	0–0	0–0	0–0	0–0	0–0	0–0	0–0	0–0	0–0	0–0	2–2	5–9	1–3	0–0	0–0	0–0	0–0	0 / 14	8–14	36%
Career statistics
	2006	2007	2008	2009	2010	2011	2012	2013	2014	2015	2016	2017	2018	2019	2020	2021	2022	2023	Career		
Tournaments	0	0	0	0	1	0	1	1	8	3	2	10	25	21	3	9	14	0	98		
Titles	0	0	0	0	0	0	0	0	0	0	0	1	0	0	0	0	0	0	1		
Finals	0	0	0	0	0	0	0	0	0	0	0	1	2	0	0	0	0	0	3		
Hard win–loss	0–0	0–0	0–0	0–0	0–0	0–0	0–1	1–1	6–5	1–2	1–2	9–6	17–17	8–14	1–3	10–7	2–10	0–0	1 / 67	56–68	45%
Clay win–loss	0–0	0–0	0–0	0–0	0–1	0–0	0–0	0–0	0–3	0–0	0–0	0–0	6–7	1–3	0–0	0–1	0–2	0–0	0 / 17	7–17	29%
Grass win–loss	0–0	0–0	0–0	0–0	0–0	0–0	0–0	0–0	2–1	0–1	0–0	5–3	0–1	1–4	0–0	3–2	1–2	0–0	0 / 14	12–14	46%
Overall win–loss	0–0	0–0	0–0	0–0	0–1	0–0	0–1	1–1	8–9	1–3	1–2	14–9	23–25	10–21	1–3	13–10	3–14	0–0	1 / 98	75–99	43%
Win %	–	–	–	–	0%	–	0%	50%	47%	25%	33%	61%	48%	32%	25%	57%	18%	–	43%		
Year-end ranking	765	436	346	386	494	250	181	162	79	194	189	60	59	118	145	86	235	377			

== ATP Tour finals ==
=== Singles: 3 (1 title, 2 runner-ups) ===
Legend Grand Slam tournaments (0–0) ATP Tour Finals (0–0) ATP Tour Masters 1000 (0–0) ATP Tour 500 Series (0–0) ATP Tour 250 Series (1–2)	Finals by surface Hard (1–1) Clay (0–1) Grass (0–0)	Finals by setting Outdoor (0–2) Indoor (1–0)

Result	W–L	Date	Tournament	Tier	Surface	Opponent	Score
Win	1–0	Sep 2017	Moselle Open, France	250 Series	Hard (i)	(France) Benoît Paire	7–5, 6–2
Loss	1–1	Feb 2018	Delray Beach Open, United States	250 Series	Hard	(United States) Frances Tiafoe	1–6, 4–6
Loss	1–2	May 2018	Geneva Open, Switzerland	250 Series	Clay	(Hungary) Márton Fucsovics	2–6, 2–6

== ATP Challenger finals ==
=== Singles: 9 (5–4) ===
Result	W–L	Date	Tournament	Surface	Opponent	Score
Loss	0–1	Aug 2011	Manerbio, Italy	Clay	(Romania) Adrian Ungur	6–4, 6–7^{(4–7)}, 2–6
Loss	0–2	Sep 2012	Shanghai, China	Hard	(Taiwan) Yen-Hsun Lu	5–7, 0–6
Win	1–2	Sep 2012	Ningbo, China	Hard	(South Korea) Jeong Suk-young	6–3, 6–1
Loss	1–3	Jul 2013	Oberstaufen, Germany	Clay	(France) Guillaume Rufin	3–6, 4–6
Win	2–3	Jan 2014	Heilbronn, Germany	Hard (i)	(Netherlands) Igor Sijsling	6–4, 7–5
Win	3–3	Nov 2014	Bratislava, Slovakia	Hard (i)	(Uzbekistan) Farrukh Dustov	7–6^{(7–2)}, 6–3
Win	4–3	Sep 2015	Nanchang, China	Hard	(Israel) Amir Weintraub	6–2, 6–1
Win	5–3	Jan 2017	Happy Valley, Australia	Hard	(Australia) Omar Jasika	6–3, 6–1
Loss	5–4	Feb 2017	Quimper, France	Hard	(France) Adrian Mannarino	4–6, 4–6

=== Doubles: 3 (0–3) ===
Result	W–L	Date	Tournament	Surface	Partner	Opponents	Score
Loss	0–1	Jul 2007	Oberstaufen, Germany	Clay	(Germany) Marc Sieber	(Slovakia) Filip Polášek (Slovakia) Igor Zelenay	5–7, 5–7
Loss	0–2	Mar 2013	San Luis, Mexico	Clay	(Switzerland) Marco Chiudinelli	(Croatia) Marin Draganja (Spain) Adrián Menéndez Maceiras	4–6, 3–6
Loss	0–3	Jun 2015	Todi, Italy	Clay	(Germany) Andreas Beck	(Italy) Flavio Cipolla (Argentina) Máximo González	4–6, 1–6

== ITF Futures finals ==
=== Singles: 12 (8–4) ===
Result	W–L	Date	Tournament	Surface	Opponent	Score
Loss	0–1	Jul 2007	Germany F6, Marburg	Clay	(Hungary) Kornél Bardóczky	6–7^{(1–7)}, 6–2, 5–7
Win	1–1	Sep 2007	Mexico F6, Monterrey	Hard	(Mexico) Luis-Manuel Flores	6–3, 6–4
Win	2–1	Oct 2007	Mexico F8, Los Cabos	Hard	(Poland) Marcin Gawron	6–4, 7–6^{(7–3)}
Win	3–1	Jan 2008	Austria F2, Bergheim	Carpet (i)	(France) Ludovic Walter	4–6, 7–6^{(7–4)}, 6–0
Win	4–1	Feb 2008	Austria F3, Bergheim	Carpet (i)	(Italy) Uros Vico	6–4, 6–4
Win	5–1	Sep 2008	India F6, Chennai	Hard	(Kazakhstan) Alexey Kedryuk	7–6^{(8–6)}, 6–1
Win	6–1	Sep 2008	India F7, New Delhi	Hard	(Pakistan) Aqeel Khan	6–1, 7–6^{(7–1)}
Win	7–1	Sep 2008	Thailand F6, Nonthaburi	Hard	(South Korea) Lim Yong-kyu	6–4, 6–2
Loss	7–2	Aug 2009	Germany F16, Überlingen	Clay	(Germany) Dennis Bloemke	2–6, 0–6
Win	8–2	Oct 2009	Germany F18, Hambach	Carpet (i)	(France) Benoît Paire	6–4, 6–4
Loss	8–3	Apr 2011	Turkey F13, Antalya	Hard	(Moldova) Radu Albot	3–6, 2–6
Loss	8–4	Jun 2011	Germany F6, Trier	Clay	(Germany) Marc Sieber	2–6, 6–4, 4–6

=== Doubles: 5 (1–4) ===
Result	W–L	Date	Tournament	Surface	Partner	Opponents	Score
Loss	0–1	Sep 2007	Monterrey, Mexico	Hard	(Germany) Marc Sieber	(Iceland) Arnar Sigurdsson (New Zealand) Adam Thompson	2–6, 1–6
Loss	0–2	Oct 2007	Los Cabos, Mexico	Hard	(Germany) Marc Sieber	(Mexico) Adrian Contreras (Mexico) Luis-Manuel Flores	3–6, 6–1, [7–10]
Loss	0–3	Feb 2008	Bergheim, Austria	Carpet (i)	(Germany) Marc Sieber	(Croatia) Antonio Šančić (Croatia) Vilim Višak	7–6^{(7–5)}, 1–6, [8–10]
Win	1–3	Sep 2008	Nonthaburi, Thailand	Hard	(Chinese Taipei) Lee Hsin-han	(Switzerland) Patrick Eichenberger (Sri Lanka) Harshana Godamanna	4–6, 7–6^{(7–1)}, [11–9]
Loss	1–4	Jun 2011	Trier, Germany	Clay	(Germany) Marc Sieber	(Sweden) Carl Bergman (Finland) Juho Paukku	4–6, 1–6

== Playing style ==
Gojowczyk possesses a fast, accurate first serve and great finishing power off both wings. He has a hard-hit, "clubbed" forehand with a long takeback, similar in some ways to Xavier Malisse. His backhand is particularly solid in terms of relative groundstroke quality, opting for frequent injections of pace, whilst not shying away from the down-the-line shot.

== Record against top-10 players ==
Gojowczyk's match record against players who have been ranked world No. 10 or higher, with those who are active in boldface.
Only ATP Tour main draw and Davis Cup matches are considered.

- Statistics correct as of 8 January 2024.

Player	Years	Matches	Record	Win %	Hard	Clay	Grass
Number 1 ranked players							
(Spain) **Carlos Alcaraz**	2021	1	0–1	0%	0–1	–	–
(Russia) **Daniil Medvedev**	2019	1	0–1	0%	0–1	–	–
(Spain) **Rafael Nadal**	2014	2	0–2	0%	0–2	–	–
(Switzerland) Roger Federer	2018–19	3	0–3	0%	0–3	–	–
Number 2 ranked players							
(Germany) **Alexander Zverev**	2018	2	0–2	0%	0–2	–	–
Number 3 ranked players							
(Canada) **Milos Raonic**	2014–19	3	2–1	67%	1–1	–	1–0
(Spain) David Ferrer	2016–18	2	1–1	50%	0–1	1–0	–
(Austria) **Dominic Thiem**	2014–17	3	1–2	33%	1–2	–	–
(Argentina) Juan Martín del Potro	2018	1	0–1	0%	–	–	0–1
(Greece) **Stefanos Tsitsipas**	2018	1	0–1	0%	0–1	–	–
Number 4 ranked players							
(Japan) **Kei Nishikori**	2018	1	0–1	0%	0–1	–	–
(Denmark) **Holger Rune**	2022	1	0–1	0%	0–1	–	–
Number 5 ranked players							
(Russia) **Andrey Rublev**	2019	1	1–0	100%	1–0	–	–
(France) Jo-Wilfried Tsonga	2014–19	3	2–1	67%	2–0	0–1	–
Number 6 ranked players							
(Italy) **Matteo Berrettini**	2018	1	1–0	100%	1–0	–	–
(France) Gilles Simon	2017–19	3	1–2	33%	1–1	–	0–1
(France) **Gaël Monfils**	2014–18	2	0–2	0%	0–2	–	–
Number 7 ranked players							
(Belgium) **David Goffin**	2017	1	0–1	0%	0–1	–	–
(France) **Richard Gasquet**	2019	1	0–1	0%	–	–	0–1
(Spain) **Fernando Verdasco**	2018	1	0–1	0%	0–1	–	–
Number 8 ranked players							
(United States) Jack Sock	2018	2	2–0	100%	2–0	–	–
(United States) John Isner	2018–22	2	1–1	50%	1–0	–	0–1
(Russia) **Karen Khachanov**	2019–21	2	1–1	50%	1–1	–	–
(Serbia) Janko Tipsarević	2019	1	0–1	0%	–	0–1	–
(Cyprus) Marcos Baghdatis	2010–17	2	0–2	0%	0–1	0–1	–
(United Kingdom) **Cameron Norrie**	2018–22	3	0–3	0%	0–2	0–1	–
Number 9 ranked players							
(Spain) Nicolás Almagro	2016	1	1–0	100%	1–0	–	–
(Italy) **Fabio Fognini**	2018–19	3	1–2	33%	0–1	1–1	–
(Poland) **Hubert Hurkacz**	2020–21	2	0–2	0%	0–2	–	–
(Spain) **Roberto Bautista Agut**	2015–21	5	0–5	0%	0–2	0–1	0–2
Number 10 ranked players							
(Australia) **Alex de Minaur**	2016	1	1–0	100%	1–0	–	–
(United States) **Frances Tiafoe**	2018	1	0–1	0%	0–1	–	–
(Spain) **Pablo Carreño Busta**	2017–20	3	0–3	0%	0–3	–	–
Total	2010–22	62	16–46	26%	13–34	2–6	1–6

== Top 10 wins ==
- Gojowczyk has a 2–14 record against players who were ranked in the top 10 at the time the match was played.

#	Player	Rank	Event	Surface	Rd	Score	PG Rank
2014
1.	(Canada) Milos Raonic	9	Halle Open, Germany	Grass	2R	6–4, 6–4	120
2018
2.	(United States) Jack Sock	8	Auckland Open, New Zealand	Hard	2R	6–3, 6–3	65

== National participation ==
=== Davis Cup (1–2) ===
Group membership World Group / Finals (1–2) WG Play-off (0–0)	Matches by type Singles (1–2) Doubles (0–0)	Matches by surface Hard (1–2) Clay (0–0)	Matches by venue Germany (0–0) Away (1–1) Neutral (0–1)

Date	Venue	Surface	Rd	Opponent nation	Score	Match	Opponent player	W/L	Rubber score
2014
Apr 2014	Nancy	Hard (i)	QF	France	2–3	Singles 2	Jo-Wilfried Tsonga	Win	5–7, 7–6^{(7–3)}, 3–6, 7–6^{(10–8)}, 8–6
Apr 2014	Nancy	Hard (i)	QF	France	2–3	Singles 5 (decider)	Gaël Monfils	Loss	1–6, 6–7^{(0–7)}, 2–6
2020–21
Nov 2021	Innsbruck	Hard (i)	QF	Great Britain	2–1	Singles 1	Dan Evans	Loss	2–6, 1–6
