= Geneva Open =

ATP Tour
- Event name: Gonet Geneva Open
- Tour: ATP Tour (1990–91; 2015–); Grand Prix circuit (1980–1989)
- Founded: 1980
- Editions: 23 (2026)
- Location: Geneva, Switzerland
- Venue: Tennis Club de Genève
- Surface: Clay
- Draw: 28S / 16Q / 16D
- Prize money: €596,035 (2025)
- Website: Official website

Current champions (2026)
- Singles: (United States) Learner Tien
- Doubles: (Monaco) Romain Arneodo (Australia) Marc Polmans

The Gonet Geneva Open is an ATP 250 tennis tournament held in Geneva, Switzerland on clay courts. It was previously held annually as a Grand Prix event from 1980 until 1989. In November 2014 the ATP announced that the Düsseldorf tournament would be moved to Geneva where it would be held in 2015 as an ATP Tour tournament.

Casper Ruud is the singles record-holder, with three editions won. Mate Pavić is the doubles record-holder with four wins, two with Oliver Marach and one with Nikola Mektić, and one with Marcelo Arévalo.

Balázs Taróczy is the only player to win both singles and doubles title the same year.

== Past finals ==
=== Singles ===
| Year | Champions | Runners-up | Score |
|---|---|---|---|
| 1980 | (Hungary) Balázs Taróczy | (Italy) Adriano Panatta | 6–3, 6–2 |
| 1981 | (Sweden) Björn Borg | (Czechoslovakia) Tomáš Šmíd | 6–4, 6–3 |
| 1982 | (Sweden) Mats Wilander | (Czechoslovakia) Tomáš Šmíd | 7–5, 4–6, 6–4 |
| 1983 | (Sweden) Mats Wilander (2) | (Sweden) Henrik Sundström | 3–6, 6–1, 6–3 |
| 1984 | (United States) Aaron Krickstein | (Sweden) Henrik Sundström | 6–7, 6–1, 6–4 |
| 1985 | (Czechoslovakia) Tomáš Šmíd | (Sweden) Mats Wilander | 6–4, 6–4 |
| 1986 | (France) Henri Leconte | (France) Thierry Tulasne | 7–5, 6–3 |
| 1987 | (Switzerland) Claudio Mezzadri | (Czechoslovakia) Tomáš Šmíd | 6–4, 7–5 |
| 1988 | (Czechoslovakia) Marián Vajda | (Sweden) Kent Carlsson | 6–4, 6–4 |
| 1989 | (Switzerland) Marc Rosset | (Argentina) Guillermo Pérez Roldán | 6–4, 7–5 |
| 1990 | (Austria) Horst Skoff | (Spain) Sergi Bruguera | 7–6, 7–6 |
| 1991 | (Austria) Thomas Muster | (Austria) Horst Skoff | 6–2, 6–4 |
| 1992–2014 | Challenger tournament | | |
| 2015 | (Brazil) Thomaz Bellucci | (Portugal) João Sousa | 7–6^{(7–4)}, 6–4 |
| 2016 | (Switzerland) Stan Wawrinka | (Croatia) Marin Čilić | 6–4, 7–6^{(13–11)} |
| 2017 | (Switzerland) Stan Wawrinka (2) | (Germany) Mischa Zverev | 4–6, 6–3, 6–3 |
| 2018 | (Hungary) Márton Fucsovics | (Germany) Peter Gojowczyk | 6–2, 6–2 |
| 2019 | (Germany) Alexander Zverev | (Chile) Nicolás Jarry | 6–3, 3–6, 7–6^{(10–8)} |
| 2020 | Not held due to COVID-19 pandemic | | |
| 2021 | (Norway) Casper Ruud | (Canada) Denis Shapovalov | 7–6^{(8–6)}, 6–4 |
| 2022 | (Norway) Casper Ruud (2) | (Portugal) João Sousa | 7–6^{(7–3)}, 4–6, 7–6^{(7–1)} |
| 2023 | (Chile) Nicolás Jarry | (Bulgaria) Grigor Dimitrov | 7–6^{(7–1)}, 6–1 |
| 2024 | (Norway) Casper Ruud (3) | (Czech Republic) Tomáš Macháč | 7–5, 6–3 |
| 2025 | (Serbia) Novak Djokovic | (Poland) Hubert Hurkacz | 5–7, 7–6^{(7–2)}, 7–6^{(7–2)} |
| 2026 | (United States) Learner Tien | (Argentina) Mariano Navone | 3–6, 6–3, 7–5 |

=== Doubles ===
| Year | Champions | Runners-up | Score |
|---|---|---|---|
| 1980 | (Socialist Federal Republic of Yugoslavia) Željko Franulović (Hungary) Balázs Taróczy (1) | (Switzerland) Heinz Günthardt (Switzerland) Markus Günthardt | 6–4, 4–6, 6–4 |
| 1981 | (Switzerland) Heinz Günthardt (Hungary) Balázs Taróczy (2) | (Czechoslovakia) Pavel Složil (Czechoslovakia) Tomáš Šmíd | 6–4, 3–6, 6–2 |
| 1982 | (Czechoslovakia) Pavel Složil (Czechoslovakia) Tomáš Šmíd (1) | (Australia) Carl Limberger (South Africa) Mike Myburg | 6–4, 6–0 |
| 1983 | (Czechoslovakia) Stanislav Birner (United States) Blaine Willenborg | (Sweden) Joakim Nyström (Sweden) Mats Wilander | 6–1, 2–6, 6–3 |
| 1984 | (Denmark) Michael Mortensen (Sweden) Mats Wilander | (Belgium) Libor Pimek (Czechoslovakia) Tomáš Šmíd | 6–1, 3–6, 7–5 |
| 1985 | (Spain) Sergio Casal (Spain) Emilio Sánchez | (Brazil) Carlos Kirmayr (Brazil) Cássio Motta | 6–4, 4–6, 7–5 |
| 1986 | (West Germany) Andreas Maurer (Sweden) Jörgen Windahl | (Argentina) Gustavo Luza (Argentina) Gustavo Tiberti | 6–4, 3–6, 6–4 |
| 1987 | (Brazil) Ricardo Acioly (Brazil) Luiz Mattar | (Iran) Mansour Bahrami (Uruguay) Diego Pérez | 3–6, 6–4, 6–2 |
| 1988 | (Iran) Mansour Bahrami (Czechoslovakia) Tomáš Šmíd (2) | (Argentina) Gustavo Luza (Argentina) Guillermo Pérez Roldán | 6–4, 6–3 |
| 1989 | (Ecuador) Andrés Gómez (Argentina) Alberto Mancini | (Iran) Mansour Bahrami (Argentina) Guillermo Pérez Roldán | 6–3, 7–5 |
| 1990 | (Argentina) Pablo Albano (Sweden) David Engel | (Australia) Neil Borwick (New Zealand) David Lewis | 6–3, 7–6 |
| 1991 | (Spain) Sergi Bruguera (Switzerland) Marc Rosset | (Sweden) Per Henricsson (Sweden) Ola Jonsson | 3–6, 6–3, 6–2 |
| 1992–2014 | Challenger tournament | | |
| 2015 | (Colombia) Juan Sebastián Cabal (Colombia) Robert Farah | (South Africa) Raven Klaasen (Chinese Taipei) Lu Yen-hsun | 7–5, 4–6, [10–7] |
| 2016 | (United States) Steve Johnson (United States) Sam Querrey | (South Africa) Raven Klaasen (United States) Rajeev Ram | 6–4, 6–1 |
| 2017 | (Netherlands) Jean-Julien Rojer (Romania) Horia Tecău | (Colombia) Juan Sebastián Cabal (Colombia) Robert Farah | 2–6, 7–6^{(11–9)}, [10–6] |
| 2018 | (Austria) Oliver Marach (1) (Croatia) Mate Pavić (1) | (Croatia) Ivan Dodig (United States) Rajeev Ram | 3–6, 7–6^{(7–3)}, [11–9] |
| 2019 | (Austria) Oliver Marach (2) (Croatia) Mate Pavić (2) | (Australia) Matthew Ebden (Sweden) Robert Lindstedt | 6–4, 6–4 |
| 2020 | Not held due to COVID-19 pandemic | | |
| 2021 | (Australia) John Peers (New Zealand) Michael Venus | (Italy) Simone Bolelli (Argentina) Máximo González | 6–2, 7–5 |
| 2022 | (Croatia) Nikola Mektić (Croatia) Mate Pavić (3) | (Spain) Pablo Andújar (Netherlands) Matwé Middelkoop | 2–6, 6–2, [10–3] |
| 2023 | (United Kingdom) Jamie Murray (New Zealand) Michael Venus (2) | (Spain) Marcel Granollers (Argentina) Horacio Zeballos | 7–6^{(8–6)}, 7–6^{(7–3)} |
| 2024 | (El Salvador) Marcelo Arévalo (Croatia) Mate Pavić (4) | (Netherlands) Jean-Julien Rojer (United Kingdom) Lloyd Glasspool | 7–6^{(7–2)}, 7–5 |
| 2025 | (France) Sadio Doumbia (France) Fabien Reboul | (Uruguay) Ariel Behar (Belgium) Joran Vliegen | 6–7^{(4–7)}, 6–4, [11–9] |
| 2026 | (Monaco) Romain Arneodo (Australia) Marc Polmans | (India) Yuki Bhambri (New Zealand) Michael Venus | 3–6, 7–6^{(7–2)}, [10–7] |
