= 1988 Swedish Open – Men's singles =

Men's singles
- 1988 Swedish Open

Final
- Champion: (Uruguay) Marcelo Filippini
- Runner-up: (Italy) Francesco Cancellotti
- Score: 2–6, 6–4, 6–4

Details
- Draw: 48
- Seeds: 16

Events
Singles	men	women
Doubles	men	women
← 1987 ·	Swedish Open	· 1989 →

The defending champion was Joakim Nyström but he lost in the quarterfinals to the seventh seeded, Marcelo Filippini from Uruguay, who went on to win the singles title.

== Seeds ==
A champion seed is indicated in bold text while text in italics indicates the round in which that seed was eliminated.

1. (Sweden) Joakim Nyström (quarterfinals)
2. (Sweden) Magnus Gustafsson (second round)
3. (Sweden) Jan Gunnarsson (third round)
4. (Netherlands) Menno Oosting (second round)
5. (Austria) Horst Skoff (third round)
6. (United States) Lawson Duncan (second round)
7. (Uruguay) **Marcelo Filippini (champion)**
8. (West Germany) Udo Riglewski (quarterfinals)
9. N/A
10. (Italy) Claudio Pistolesi (third round)
11. (Sweden) Christian Bergström (semifinals)
12. (Spain) Fernando Luna (third round)
13. (Uruguay) Diego Pérez (second round)
14. (France) Thierry Champion (third round)
15. (Spain) Alberto Tous (third round)
16. (Sweden) Niclas Kroon (third round)

== Draw ==
=== Key ===
- Q = Qualifier
- WC = Wild card
- LL = Lucky loser
- Alt = Alternate
- SE = Special exempt
- PR = Protected ranking
- ITF = ITF entry
- JE = Junior exempt
- w/o = Walkover
- r = Retired
- d = Defaulted
- SR = Special ranking

=== Finals ===
Semifinals
7	**(Uruguay) Marcelo Filippini**	2	**6**	**6**
(Italy) Paolo Cane	**6**	2	4
11	(Sweden) Christian Bergström	4	2
**(Italy) Francesco Cancellotti**	**6**	**6**

Final
7	**(Uruguay) Marcelo Filippini**	2	**6**	**6**
(Italy) Francesco Cancellotti	**6**	4	4

=== Top half ===
==== Section 1 ====
First round
(Austria) A Antonisch	3	2
**(Sweden) U Stenlund**	**6**	**6**
Q	**(Sweden) P Svensson**	**6**	**6**
(Czechoslovakia) B Stankovič	2	2
**(United Kingdom) S Shaw**	3	**7**	**6**
(Sweden) F Waern	**6**	5	2
**(New Zealand) S Guy**	5	**7**	**7**
(Sweden) P Lindgren	**7**	5	5

Second round
1	**(Sweden) J Nyström**	4	**6**	**6**
(Sweden) U Stenlund	**6**	2	3
Q	(Sweden) P Svensson	**6**	2	3
16	**(Sweden) N Kroon**	4	**6**	**6**
LL	**(Sweden) R Båthman**	**7**	**7**
(United Kingdom) S Shaw	6	5
(New Zealand) S Guy	1	1
7	**(Uruguay) M Filipinni**	**6**	**6**

Third round
1	**(Sweden) J Nyström**	3	**6**	**6**
16	(Sweden) N Kroon	**6**	4	1
LL	(Sweden) R Båthman	2	**7**	1
7	**(Uruguay) M Filippini**	**6**	6	**6**

Quarterfinals
1	(Sweden) J Nyström	2	3
7	**(Uruguay) M Filippini**	**6**	**6**

==== Section 2 ====
First round
**(France) J-P Fleurian**	**6**	**6**
(Argentina) F Yunis	3	0
(Netherlands) T Nijssen	3	3
**(Italy) P Cane**	**6**	**6**
(Sweden) J Windahl	6	1
**(Argentina) M Ingaramo**	**7**	**6**
WC	(Sweden) H Sundström	5	0
Q	**(Sweden) N Kulti**	**7**	**6**

Second round
3	**(Sweden) J Gunnarsson**	**6**	**7**
(France) J-P Fleurian	3	6
**(Italy) P Cane**	**6**	**6**
13	(Uruguay) D Pérez	1	4
12	**(Spain) F Luna**	**6**	**6**
(Argentina) M Ingaramo	3	3
Q	**(Sweden) N Kulti**	**6**	**7**
6	(United States) L Duncan	3	5

Third round
3	(Sweden) J Gunnarsson	6	1
**(Italy) P Cane**	**7**	**6**
12	**(Spain) F Luna**	**6**	**6**
Q	(Sweden) N Kulti	4	2

Quarterfinals
**(Italy) P Cane**	**6**	**6**
12	(Spain) F Luna	2	2

=== Bottom half ===
==== Section 3 ====
First round
(West Germany) H Schwaier	1	**6**	3
**(Mexico) L Lavalle**	**6**	1	**6**
WC	(Sweden) L-A Wahlgren	**7**	6	6
**(Czechoslovakia) L Pimek**	5	**7**	**7**
Q	(Sweden) J Sandberg	3	4
WC	**(Sweden) L Jönsson**	**6**	**6**
**(Czechoslovakia) K Nováček**	**6**	**6**
Q	(Spain) J Báguena	1	2

Second round
5	**(Austria) H Skoff**	**6**	**6**
(Mexico) L Lavalle	4	2
(Czechoslovakia) L Pimek	3	1
11	**(Sweden) C Bergström**	**6**	**6**
14	**(France) T Champion**	**6**	**6**
WC	(Sweden) L Jönsson	3	4
**(Czechoslovakia) K Nováček**	**6**	**6**
4	(Netherlands) M Oosting	1	2

Third round
5	(Austria) H Skoff	6	1
11	**(Sweden) C Bergström**	**7**	**6**
14	(France) T Champion	1	4
**(Czechoslovakia) K Nováček**	**6**	**6**

Quarterfinals
11	**(Sweden) C Bergström**	1	**6**	**6**
(Czechoslovakia) K Nováček	**6**	2	3

==== Section 4 ====
First round
**(Czechoslovakia) J Čihák**	**6**	**6**
Q	(Sweden) D Engel	4	1
**(Mexico) A Moreno**	4	**6**	**6**
(West Germany) P Baur	**6**	3	2
WC	**(Sweden) T Svantesson**	**6**	2
(Czechoslovakia) J Navrátil	3	0r
**(Italy) F Cancellotti**	**6**	**6**
Q	(Sweden) Patrik Wennberg	2	2

Second round
8	**(West Germany) U Riglewski**	3	**6**	**6**
(Czechoslovakia) J Čihák	**6**	4	2
(Mexico) A Moreno	**6**	4	5
10	**(Italy) C Pistolesi**	4	**6**	**7**
15	**(Spain) A Tous**	4	**6**	**6**
WC	(Sweden) T Svantesson	**6**	4	2
**(Italy) F Cancellotti**	**7**	**6**
2	(Sweden) M Gustafsson	6	1

Third round
8	**(West Germany) U Riglewski**	**7**	**6**
10	(Italy) C Pistolesi	6	1
15	(Spain) A Tous	3	1
**(Italy) F Cancellotti**	**6**	**6**

Quarterfinals
8	(West Germany) U Riglewski	3	1
**(Italy) F Cancellotti**	**6**	**6**
