= 1986 Swedish Open – Doubles =

Doubles
- 1986 Swedish Open

Final
- Champions: (Spain) Sergio Casal (Spain) Emilio Sánchez
- Runners-up: (South Africa) C Campbell (United States) Joey Rive
- Score: 6–4, 6–2

Events
| Singles | Doubles |
| ← 1985 · | Swedish Open | · 1987 → |

Stefan Edberg and Anders Järryd were the defending champions, but they did not participate this year.

Sergio Casal and Emilio Sánchez won the title, defeating Craig Campbell and Joey Rive, 6–4, 6–2 in the final.

== Seeds ==
Champion seeds are indicated in bold text while text in italics indicates the round in which those seeds were eliminated.

1. **(Spain) Sergio Casal / (Spain) Emilio Sánchez (champions)**
2. (Italy) Claudio Panatta / (Sweden) Hans Simonsson (first round)
3. (Sweden) Peter Lundgren / (Denmark) Michael Mortensen (quarterfinals)
4. (Sweden) Ronnie Båthman / (Sweden) Stefan Svensson (first round)

== Draw ==
=== Key ===
- Q = Qualifier
- WC = Wild card
- LL = Lucky loser
- Alt = Alternate
- ITF = ITF entry
- PR = Protected ranking
- SR = Special ranking
- SE = Special exempt
- JE = Junior exempt
- JR = Junior Accelerator Programme entrant
- CO = College Accelerator Programme entrant
- NG = Next Gen Accelerator Program entrant
- w/o = Walkover
- r = Retired
- d = Defaulted

First round
1 | (Spain) **S Casal** (Spain) **E Sánchez** | **6** | **6**
(Sweden) C Bergström (Italy) C Pistolesi | 3 | 4
(Czechoslovakia) **M Mečíř** (Czechoslovakia) **M Vajda** | 2 | **6** | **6**
(Czechoslovakia) S Birner (Australia) M Fancutt | **6** | 4 | 3
3 | (Sweden) **P Lundgren** (Denmark) **M Mortensen** | 3 | **7** | **6**
(Spain) D de Miguel (Spain) JA Rodríguez | **6** | 5 | 2
(Denmark) **M Christensen** (Denmark) **M Tauson** | **6** | **6**
(Sweden) N Kroon (Sweden) L-A Wahlgren | 2 | 3
(Sweden) D Engel (Sweden) U Stenlund | 2 | 6
(Sweden) **P Hjertquist** (Sweden) **P Svensson** | **6** | **7**
(Finland) **J Berner** (Spain) **JC Báguena** | 3 | **7** | **6**
4 | (Sweden) R Båthman (Sweden) S Svensson | **6** | 6 | 3
(Sweden) H Holm (Sweden) N Utgren | 3 | 5
(South Africa) **C Campbell** (United States) **J Rive** | **6** | **7**
(Sweden) **M Pernfors** (Sweden) **M Tideman** | **6** | 3 | **6**
2 | (Italy) C Panatta (Sweden) H Simonsson | 4 | **6** | 4

Quarterfinals
1 | (Spain) **S Casal** (Spain) **E Sánchez** | w/o
(Czechoslovakia) M Mečíř (Czechoslovakia) M Vajda
3 | (Sweden) P Lundgren (Denmark) M Mortensen | 4 | 3
(Denmark) **M Christensen** (Denmark) **M Tauson** | **6** | **6**
(Sweden) **P Hjertquist** (Sweden) **P Svensson** | **7** | **6**
(Finland) J Berner (Spain) JC Báguena | 6 | 0
(South Africa) **C Campbell** (United States) **J Rive** | **6** | **6**
2 | (Sweden) M Pernfors (Sweden) M Tideman | 4 | 4

Semifinals
1 | (Spain) **S Casal** (Spain) **E Sánchez** | **6** | **6**
(Denmark) M Christensen (Denmark) M Tauson | 3 | 3
(Sweden) P Hjertquist (Sweden) P Svensson | 5 | **6** | 1
(South Africa) **C Campbell** (United States) **J Rive** | **7** | 4 | **6**

Final
1 | (Spain) **S Casal** (Spain) **E Sánchez** | **6** | **6**
(South Africa) C Campbell (United States) J Rive | 4 | 2
