= 1990 Swedish Open – Men's singles =

Men's singles
- 1990 Swedish Open

Final
- Champion: (Australia) Richard Fromberg
- Runner-up: (Sweden) Magnus Larsson
- Score: 6–2, 7–6

Details
- Draw: 32
- Seeds: 8

Events
Singles	men	women
Doubles	men	women
← 1989 ·	Swedish Open	· 1991 →

The defending champion was Paolo Canè but he did not participate, in 1990. The fourth seeded, Richard Fromberg from Australia won the singles title.

== Seeds ==
A champion seed is indicated in bold text while text in italics indicates the round in which that seed was eliminated.

1. (Argentina) Guillermo Pérez Roldán (second round)
2. (Sweden) Mats Wilander (second round)
3. (Socialist Federal Republic of Yugoslavia) Goran Prpić (quarterfinals)
4. (Australia) **Richard Fromberg (champion)**
5. N/A
6. (Netherlands) Paul Haarhuis (first round)
7. (Sweden) Jan Gunnarsson (first round)
8. (Finland) Aki Rahunen (quarterfinals)

== Draw ==
=== Key ===
- Q = Qualifier
- WC = Wild card
- LL = Lucky loser
- Alt = Alternate
- SE = Special exempt
- PR = Protected ranking
- ITF = ITF entry
- JE = Junior exempt
- w/o = Walkover
- r = Retired
- d = Defaulted
- SR = Special ranking

First round
1	(Argentina) **G Pérez Roldán**	**6**	**6**
WC	(Sweden) T Enqvist	4	2
(Sweden) N Kroon	5	**6**	3
(Sweden) **L Jönsson**	**6**	3	**6**
Q	(Sweden) J Apell	1	1
(Finland) **V Paloheimo**	**6**	**6**
(Sweden) **D Engel**	**6**	**6**
7	(Sweden) J Gunnarsson	2	0
4	(Australia) **R Fromberg**	**7**	**7**
(Czechoslovakia) M Vajda	6	5
Q	(Sweden) R Båthman	**6**	3	4
WC	(Sweden) **N Utgren**	1	**6**	**6**
LL	(Sweden) **M Nilsson**	**7**	5	**7**
(Spain) J Altur	6	**7**	6
(Uruguay) **D Pérez**	**7**	1	**6**
6	(Netherlands) P Haarhuis	6	**6**	3
LL	(Sweden) **J Carlsson**	0	**6**	**6**
(West Germany) U Riglewski	**6**	3	4
(Sweden) **M Larsson**	**6**	**6**
(France) F Santoro	3	1
Q	(Sweden) **P Henricsson**	**6**	**6**
(France) T Tulasne	4	4
(Czechoslovakia) M Strelba	**6**	5	6
3	(Socialist Federal Republic of Yugoslavia) **G Prpić**	1	**7**	**7**
8	(Finland) **A Rahunen**	**6**	**6**
(Sweden) L Wahlgren	1	2
WC	(Sweden) **N Kulti**	**6**	**6**
Q	(Sweden) O Kristiansson	1	2
(Uruguay) **M Filippini**	**6**	**6**
(Socialist Federal Republic of Yugoslavia) B Orešar	3	2
(Australia) J Anderson	0	3
2	(Sweden) **M Wilander**	**6**	**6**

Second round
1	(Argentina) G Pérez Roldán	4	**7**	3
(Sweden) **L Jönsson**	**6**	5	**6**
(Finland) **V Paloheimo**	**6**	**7**
(Sweden) D Engel	2	5
4	(Australia) **R Fromberg**	6	**6**	**7**
WC	(Sweden) N Utgren	**7**	3	6
LL	(Sweden) M Nilsson	2	3
(Uruguay) **D Pérez**	**6**	**6**
LL	(Sweden) J Carlsson	4	4
(Sweden) **M Larsson**	**6**	**6**
Q	(Sweden) P Henricsson	3	**6**	3
3	(Socialist Federal Republic of Yugoslavia) **G Prpić**	**6**	4	**6**
8	(Finland) **A Rahunen**	**6**	**6**
WC	(Sweden) N Kulti	4	0
(Uruguay) **M Filippini**	**6**	3	**7**
2	(Sweden) M Wilander	2	**6**	6

Quarterfinals
(Sweden) **L Jönsson**	**6**	**6**
(Finland) V Paloheimo	1	2
4	(Australia) **R Fromberg**	**7**	**6**
(Uruguay) D Pérez	5	3
(Sweden) **M Larsson**	**6**	4	**6**
3	(Socialist Federal Republic of Yugoslavia) G Prpić	3	**6**	3
8	(Finland) A Rahunen	1	3
(Uruguay) **M Filippini**	**6**	**6**

Semifinals
(Sweden) L Jönsson	4	2
4	(Australia) **R Fromberg**	**6**	**6**
(Sweden) **M Larsson**	**6**	**6**
(Uruguay) M Filippini	4	1

Final
4	(Australia) **R Fromberg**	**6**	**7**
(Sweden) M Larsson	2	6
