= 1989 Volvo Open – Men's doubles =

Men's doubles
- 1989 Volvo Open

Final
- Champions: (Sweden) Per Henricsson (Sweden) Nicklas Utgren
- Runners-up: (Czechoslovakia) Josef Čihák (Czechoslovakia) Karel Nováček
- Score: 7–5, 6–2

Events
Singles	men	women
Doubles	men	women
- Swedish Open

Patrick Baur and Udo Riglewski were the defending champions of the tennis competition, but neither competed this year.

Per Henricsson and Nicklas Utgren won the title by defeating Josef Čihák and Karel Nováček 7–5, 6–2 in the final.

== Seeds ==
1. (Denmark) Michael Mortensen / (Sweden) Tobias Svantesson (first round)
2. (Sweden) Ronnie Båthman / (Sweden) Tomas Nydahl (semifinals)
3. (Sweden) Peter Svensson (tennis) / (Sweden) Lars-Anders Wahlgren (quarterfinals)
4. (Sweden) Niclas Kroon / (Czechoslovakia) Miloslav Mečíř (first round)

== Draw ==
Key

- Q = Qualifier
- WC = Wild card
- LL = Lucky loser
- Alt = Alternate
- ITF = ITF entry
- PR = Protected ranking
- SR = Special ranking
- SE = Special exempt
- JE = Junior exempt
- JR = Junior Accelerator Programme entrant
- CO = College Accelerator Programme entrant
- NG = Next Gen Accelerator Program entrant
- w/o = Walkover
- r = Retired
- d = Defaulted

=== Draw ===
First round
1	(Denmark) M Mortensen (Sweden) T Svantesson	4	3
(Czechoslovakia) J Čihák (Czechoslovakia) K Nováček	6	6
(Sweden) C Allgårdh (Australia) J Anderson	6	7
(Sweden) N Kulti (Sweden) M Larsson	3	6
3	(Sweden) P Svensson (Sweden) LA Wahlgren	6	7
(Spain) J Arrese (Argentina) G Rivas	4	5
(Sweden) D Engel (Sweden) M Gustafsson	6	6
(Sweden) J Apell (Sweden) P Nyborg	3	3
(Denmark) M Tauson (Canada) M Wostenholme	7	7
(Sweden) S Svensson (Sweden) J Svensson	6	6
(Sweden) P Henricsson (Sweden) N Utgren	7	6
4	(Sweden) N Kroon (Czechoslovakia) M Mečíř	5	4
(Sweden) N Holm (Sweden) F Nilsson	6	2	7
(Sweden) C Bergström (Socialist Federal Republic of Yugoslavia) B Orešar	3	6	6
(Sweden) L Jönsson (Sweden) M Zeile	5	1
2	(Sweden) R Båthman (Sweden) T Nydahl	7	6

Quarterfinals
(Czechoslovakia) J Čihák (Czechoslovakia) K Nováček	6	3	6
(Sweden) C Allgårdh (Australia) J Anderson	3	6	4
3	(Sweden) P Svensson (Sweden) LA Wahlgren	6	6	4
(Sweden) D Engel (Sweden) M Gustafsson	2	7	6
(Denmark) M Tauson (Canada) M Wostenholme	1	3
(Sweden) P Henricsson (Sweden) N Utgren	6	6
(Sweden) N Holm (Sweden) F Nilsson	6	4	2
2	(Sweden) R Båthman (Sweden) T Nydahl	4	6	6

Semifinals
(Czechoslovakia) J Čihák (Czechoslovakia) K Nováček	6	6
(Sweden) D Engel (Sweden) M Gustafsson	3	4
(Sweden) P Henricsson (Sweden) N Utgren	6	7
2	(Sweden) R Båthman (Sweden) T Nydahl	3	6

Final
(Czechoslovakia) J Čihák (Czechoslovakia) K Nováček	5	2
(Sweden) P Henricsson (Sweden) N Utgren	7	6
