= 1987 Swedish Open – Doubles =

Doubles
- 1987 Swedish Open

Final
- Champions: (Sweden) Stefan Edberg (Sweden) Anders Järryd
- Runners-up: (Spain) Emilio Sánchez (Spain) Javier Sánchez
- Score: 7–6, 6–3

Events
Singles	Doubles
← 1986 ·	Swedish Open	· 1988 →

Sergio Casal and Emilio Sánchez were the defending champions, but they did not participate as a team this year.

Stefan Edberg and Anders Järryd won the title, defeating Emilio Sánchez and Javier Sánchez, 7–6, 6–3 in the final.

== Seeds ==
Champion seeds are indicated in bold text while text in italics indicates the round in which those seeds were eliminated.

1. **(Sweden) Stefan Edberg / (Sweden) Anders Järryd (champions)**
2. (Czechoslovakia) Jaroslav Navrátil / (Uruguay) Diego Pérez (semifinals)
3. (Sweden) Jan Gunnarsson / (Sweden) Mikael Pernfors (first round)
4. (Spain) Emilio Sánchez / (Spain) Javier Sánchez (final)

== Draw ==
=== Key ===
- Q = Qualifier
- WC = Wild card
- LL = Lucky loser
- Alt = Alternate
- SE = Special exempt
- PR = Protected ranking
- ITF = ITF entry
- JE = Junior exempt
- w/o = Walkover
- r = Retired
- d = Defaulted
- SR = Special ranking

First round
1	(Sweden) **S Edberg** (Sweden) **A Järryd**	**6**	**6**
(Sweden) K Carlsson (Sweden) J Nyström	3	4
(Sweden) **M Gustafsson** (Sweden) **F Waern**	3	**6**	**7**
(Sweden) P Carlsson (Sweden) J Windahl	**6**	4	6
3	(Sweden) J Gunnarsson (Sweden) M Pernfors	**6**	0	3
(Sweden) **H Holm** **(Sweden) T Nydahl**	1	**6**	**6**
(Denmark) M Christensen (West Germany) D Keretić	6	5
(Switzerland) **H Günthardt** (Hungary) **B Taróczy**	**7**	**7**
(Italy) F Cancellotti (Italy) D Nargiso	**6**	2	6
(Sweden) **H Simonsson** (Sweden) **M Wilander**	3	**6**	**7**
(Sweden) P Svensson (Sweden) L-A Wahlgren	**7**	4	2
4	(Spain) **E Sánchez** (Spain) **J Sánchez**	6	**6**	**6**
(United States) L Duncan (Sweden) D Engel	6	3
(South Africa) **C Campbell** (Sweden) **S Svensson**	**7**	**6**
(West Germany) W Popp (West Germany) P Vojtischek	4	3
2	(Czechoslovakia) **J Navrátil** (Uruguay) **D Pérez**	**6**	**6**

Quarterfinals
1	(Sweden) **S Edberg** (Sweden) **A Järryd**	**6**	**6**
(Sweden) M Gustafsson (Sweden) F Waern	3	1
(Sweden) H Holm (Sweden) T Nydahl	4	4
(Switzerland) **H Günthardt** (Hungary) **B Taróczy**	**6**	**6**
(Sweden) H Simonsson (Sweden) M Wilander	2	2
4	(Spain) **E Sánchez** (Spain) **J Sánchez**	**6**	**6**
(South Africa) C Campbell (Sweden) S Svensson	2	**6**	6
2	(Czechoslovakia) **J Navrátil** (Uruguay) **D Pérez**	**6**	2	**7**

Semifinals
1	(Sweden) **S Edberg** (Sweden) **A Järryd**	2	**7**	**7**
(Switzerland) H Günthardt (Hungary) B Taróczy	**6**	5	6
4	(Spain) **E Sánchez** (Spain) **J Sánchez**	4
2	(Czechoslovakia) J Navrátil (Uruguay) D Pérez	1^{r}

Final
1	(Sweden) **S Edberg** (Sweden) **A Järryd**	**7**	**6**
4	(Spain) E Sánchez (Spain) J Sánchez	6	3
