= 1988 Swedish Open – Men's doubles =

Men's doubles
- 1988 Swedish Open

Final
- Champions: (West Germany) Patrick Baur (West Germany) Udo Riglewski
- Runners-up: (Sweden) Stefan Edberg (Sweden) Niclas Kroon
- Score: 6–7, 6–3, 7–6

Details
- Draw: 24
- Seeds: 8

Events
Singles	men	women
Doubles	men	women
← 1987 ·	Swedish Open	· 1989 →

Stefan Edberg and Anders Järryd were the defending champions, but they did not participate as a team, Edberg reached the final with Niclas Kroon.

Patrick Baur and Udo Riglewski won the title, defeating Stefan Edberg and Niclas Kroon, 6–7, 6–3, 7–6 in the final.

== Seeds ==
Champion seeds are indicated in bold text while text in italics indicates the round in which those seeds were eliminated.

1. (Czechoslovakia) Jaroslav Navrátil / (Netherlands) Tom Nijssen (second round)
2. (Sweden) Jan Gunnarsson / (Sweden) Joakim Nyström (semifinals)
3. (Mexico) Leonardo Lavalle / (Mexico) Agustín Moreno (second round)
4. (Czechoslovakia) Josef Čihák / (Czechoslovakia) Karel Nováček (quarterfinals)
5. (Sweden) Stefan Edberg / (Sweden) Niclas Kroon (final)
6. (Uruguay) Marcelo Filippini / (Uruguay) Diego Pérez (second round)
7. (Switzerland) Heinz Gunthardt / (Hungary) Balázs Taróczy (quarterfinals)
8. (Sweden) Ronnie Båthman / (Sweden) Jörgen Windahl (second round)

== Draw ==
=== Key ===
- Q = Qualifier
- WC = Wild card
- LL = Lucky loser
- Alt = Alternate
- SE = Special exempt
- PR = Protected ranking
- ITF = ITF entry
- JE = Junior exempt
- w/o = Walkover
- r = Retired
- d = Defaulted
- SR = Special ranking

=== Finals ===
Semifinals
**(West Germany) Patrick Baur** **(West Germany) Udo Riglewski**	6	**6**	**6**
(France) Thierry Champion (France) Jean-Philippe Fleurian	**7**	1	4
5	**(Sweden) Stefan Edberg** **(Sweden) Niclas Kroon**	5	**6**	**6**
2	(Sweden) Jan Gunnarsson (Sweden) Joakim Nyström	**7**	3	4

Final
**(West Germany) Patrick Baur** **(West Germany) Udo Riglewski**	6	**6**	**7**
5	(Sweden) Stefan Edberg (Sweden) Niclas Kroon	**7**	3	6

=== Top half ===
First round
**(United States) L Duncan** **(Spain) A Tous**	**7**	3	**7**
(Netherlands) M Oosting (Sweden) T Svantesson	5	**6**	5
**(West Germany) P Baur** **(West Germany) U Riglewski**	**7**	**6**
(Italy) C Pistolesi (West Germany) H Schwaier	5	3
(Sweden) P Svensson (Sweden) L-A Wahlgren	**6**	3	4
**(France) T Champion** **(France) J-P Fleurian**	1	**6**	**6**
(Spain) JC Báguena (Argentina) M Ingaramo	2	**6**	4
**(Czechoslovakia) L Pimek** **(Czechoslovakia) B Stankovič**	**6**	4	**6**

Second round
1	(Czechoslovakia) J Navrátil (Netherlands) T Nijssen	2	6
**(United States) L Duncan** **(Spain) A Tous**	**6**	**7**
**(West Germany) P Baur** **(West Germany) U Riglewski**	**6**	**6**
8	(Sweden) R Båthman (Sweden) J Windahl	4	4
3	(Mexico) L Lavalle (Mexico) A Moreno	6	3
**(France) T Champion** **(France) J-P Fleurian**	**7**	**6**
**(Czechoslovakia) L Pimek** **(Czechoslovakia) B Stankovič**	4	**6**	**6**
6	(Uruguay) M Filippini (Uruguay) D Pérez	**6**	4	3

Quarterfinals
(United States) L Duncan (Spain) A Tous	4	3
**(West Germany) P Baur** **(West Germany) U Riglewski**	**6**	**6**
**(France) T Champion** **(France) J-P Fleurian**	**6**	4	**6**
(Czechoslovakia) L Pimek (Czechoslovakia) B Stankovič	4	**6**	4

Semifinals
**(West Germany) P Baur** **(West Germany) U Riglewski**	6	**6**	**6**
(France) T Champion (France) J-P Fleurian	**7**	1	4

=== Bottom half ===
First round
WC	**(Sweden) C Bergström** **(Sweden) M Gustafsson**	1	**7**	**7**
(Austria) A Antonitsch (Austria) H Skoff	**6**	5	6
WC	**(Sweden) N Kulti** **(Sweden) M Larsson**	**6**	**6**
(Sweden) A Henricsson (Sweden) P Lindgren	2	2
(Sweden) D Engel (Sweden) S Svensson	3	2
**(Italy) F Cancellotti** **(Italy) P Cane**	**6**	**6**
(Sweden) H Holm (Sweden) T Nydahl	3	5
**(New Zealand) S Guy** **(United Kingdom) S Shaw**	**6**	**7**

Second round
5	**(Sweden) S Edberg** **(Sweden) N Kroon**	**7**	5	**6**
WC	(Sweden) C Bergström (Sweden) M Gustafsson	5	**7**	1
WC	(Sweden) N Kulti (Sweden) M Larsson	1	**6**	1
4	**(Czechoslovakia) J Čihák** **(Czechoslovakia) K Nováček**	**6**	3	**6**
7	**(Switzerland) H Gunthardt** **(Hungary) B Taróczy**	**6**	**6**
(Italy) F Cancellotti (Italy) P Cane	4	4
(New Zealand) S Guy (United Kingdom) S Shaw	2	**6**	3
2	**(Sweden) J Gunnarsson** **(Sweden) J Nyström**	**6**	4	**6**

Quarterfinals
5	**(Sweden) S Edberg** **(Sweden) N Kroon**	2	**6**	**6**
4	(Czechoslovakia) J Čihák (Czechoslovakia) K Nováček	**6**	2	3
7	(Switzerland) H Gunthardt (Hungary) B Taróczy	3	**6**	3
2	**(Sweden) J Gunnarsson** **(Sweden) J Nyström**	**6**	1	**6**

Semifinals
5	**(Sweden) S Edberg** **(Sweden) N Kroon**	5	**6**	**6**
2	(Sweden) J Gunnarsson (Sweden) J Nyström	**7**	3	4
