= 1990 Geneva Open – Singles =

Singles
- 1990 Geneva Open

Final
- Champion: (Austria) Horst Skoff
- Runner-up: (Spain) Sergi Bruguera
- Score: 7–6^{(10–8)}, 7–6^{(7–4)}

Details
- Draw: 32
- Seeds: 8

Events
Singles	Doubles
← 1989 ·	Geneva Open	· 1991 →

Marc Rosset was the defending champion, but lost in the semifinals this year.

Horst Skoff won the title, defeating Sergi Bruguera 7–6^{(10–8)}, 7–6^{(7–4)} in the final.

== Seeds ==
1. (France) Henri Leconte (quarterfinals)
2. (Austria) Horst Skoff (champion)
3. (Switzerland) Jakob Hlasek (second round)
4. (Switzerland) Marc Rosset (semifinals)
5. (Italy) Omar Camporese (quarterfinals)
6. (Spain) Sergi Bruguera (final)
7. (Socialist Federal Republic of Yugoslavia) Goran Prpić (first round)
8. (Argentina) Franco Davín (second round)

== Draw ==
=== Key ===
- Q = Qualifier
- WC = Wild card
- LL = Lucky loser
- Alt = Alternate
- SE = Special exempt
- PR = Protected ranking
- ITF = ITF entry
- JE = Junior exempt
- w/o = Walkover
- r = Retired
- d = Defaulted
- SR = Special ranking

=== Finals ===
Semifinals
(Denmark) Michael Tauson	1	2
6	(Spain) Sergi Bruguera	6	6
4	(Switzerland) Marc Rosset	6	3	2
2	(Austria) Horst Skoff	4	6	6

Final
6	(Spain) Sergi Bruguera	6^{8}	6^{4}
2	(Austria) Horst Skoff	7^{10}	7^{7}

=== Top half ===
First round
1/WC	(France) H Leconte	6	6
(Portugal) J Cunha-Silva	3	4
(Sweden) L Jönsson	5	6	6
(Sweden) D Engel	7	3	2
(Sweden) N Kulti	4	3
(Denmark) M Tauson	6	6
WC	(Switzerland) C Mezzadri	7	6	1
8	(Argentina) F Davín	5	7	6
3	(Switzerland) J Hlasek	6	6
(Czechoslovakia) M Střelba	4	3
Q	(Argentina) D Orsanic	5	6	2
WC	(Argentina) H de la Peña	7	2	6
(Sweden) J Gunnarsson	6	3	6
(Brazil) C Motta	3	6	2
(Argentina) R Azar	1	3
6	(Spain) S Bruguera	6	6

Second round
1/WC	(France) H Leconte	6	6
(Sweden) L Jönsson	1	2
(Denmark) M Tauson	6	6
8	(Argentina) F Davín	3	4
3	(Switzerland) J Hlasek	4	2
WC	(Argentina) H de la Peña	6	6
(Sweden) J Gunnarsson	5	2
6	(Spain) S Bruguera	7	6

Quarterfinals
1/WC	(France) H Leconte	4	3
(Denmark) M Tauson	6	6
WC	(Argentina) H de la Peña	0	2
6	(Spain) S Bruguera	6	6

Semifinals
(Denmark) M Tauson	1	2
6	(Spain) S Bruguera	6	6

=== Bottom half ===
First round
5	(Italy) O Camporese	6	6
(Socialist Federal Republic of Yugoslavia) B Orešar	4	4
(West Germany) U Riglewski	6	3
(Czechoslovakia) M Vajda	7	6
Q	(Argentina) R Argüello	5	3
(West Germany) A Mronz	7	6
Q	(Argentina) P Albano	4	2
4	(Switzerland) M Rosset	6	6
7	(Socialist Federal Republic of Yugoslavia) G Prpić	4	7	4
(Italy) R Furlan	6	6	6
Q	(Spain) JA Conde	6	6
(South Africa) M Kaplan	4	1
(Spain) F Clavet	3	1
(Italy) P Canè	6	6
(Sweden) C Bergström	4	4
2	(Austria) H Skoff	6	6

Second round
5	(Italy) O Camporese	6	6
(Czechoslovakia) M Vajda	4	4
(West Germany) A Mronz	4	2
4	(Switzerland) M Rosset	6	6
(Italy) R Furlan	6	6
Q	(Spain) JA Conde	2	4
(Italy) P Canè	4	2
2	(Austria) H Skoff	6	6

Quarterfinals
5	(Italy) O Camporese	6	6
4	(Switzerland) M Rosset	7	7
(Italy) R Furlan	6	6
2	(Austria) H Skoff	7	7

Semifinals
4	(Switzerland) M Rosset	6	3	2
2	(Austria) H Skoff	4	6	6
