= 1986 Swedish Open – Singles =

Singles
- 1986 Swedish Open

Final
- Champion: (Spain) Emilio Sánchez
- Runner-up: (Sweden) Mats Wilander
- Score: 7–6, 4–6, 6–4

Details
- Draw: 32
- Seeds: 8

Events
Singles	Doubles
← 1985 ·	Swedish Open	· 1987 →

The defending champion was Mats Wilander but he lost in the final to the sixth seeded, Emilio Sánchez from Spain.

== Seeds ==
A champion seed is indicated in bold text while text in italics indicates the round in which that seed was eliminated.

1. (Sweden) Mats Wilander (final)
2. (Sweden) Stefan Edberg (semifinal)
3. (Sweden) Joakim Nyström (first round)
4. (Sweden) Mikael Pernfors (quarterfinals)
5. (Czechoslovakia) Miloslav Mečíř (semifinal)
6. (Spain) **Emilio Sánchez (champion)**
7. (West Germany) Eric Jelen (quarterfinals)
8. (Sweden) Ulf Stenlund (quarterfinals)

== Draw ==
=== Key ===
- Q = Qualifier
- WC = Wild card
- LL = Lucky loser
- Alt = Alternate
- ITF = ITF entry
- PR = Protected ranking
- SR = Special ranking
- SE = Special exempt
- JE = Junior exempt
- JR = Junior Accelerator Programme entrant
- CO = College Accelerator Programme entrant
- NG = Next Gen Accelerator Program entrant
- w/o = Walkover
- r = Retired
- d = Defaulted

First round
1	(Sweden) **M Wilander**	**6**	**6**
(Italy) C Pistolesi	4	2
Q	(Spain) JC Báguena	**6**	6	5
(Sweden) **T Högstedt**	3	**7**	**7**
Q	(Sweden) N Kroon	0	0
(Sweden) **P Carlsson**	**6**	**6**
Q	(Sweden) P Henricsson	3	0
7	(West Germany) **E Jelen**	**6**	**6**
4	(Sweden) **M Pernfors**	**6**	2	**6**
(Italy) C Panatta	3	**6**	3
(West Germany) **D Keretić**	**6**	0	**6**
(Sweden) P Lundgren	3	**6**	3
WC	(Spain) **D de Miguel**	**7**	**6**
(West Germany) P Moraing	6	0
(Sweden) J Svensson	1	2
5	(Czechoslovakia) **M Mečíř**	**6**	**6**
6	(Spain) **E Sánchez**	**6**	**6**
WC	(Sweden) L-A Wahlgren	3	4
Q	(Sweden) **F Rosenquist**	5	**6**	**6**
WC	(Sweden) M Tideman	**7**	0	0
(Czechoslovakia) **M Vajda**	**6**	**6**
(Sweden) S Simonsson	4	1
(Italy) **P Canè**	2	**6**	**6**
3	(Sweden) J Nyström	**6**	4	4
8	(Sweden) **U Stenland**	**7**	4	**6**
(Spain) S Casal	5	**6**	2
(Sweden) R Båthman	1	**6**	3
(Czechoslovakia) **S Birner**	**6**	1	**6**
(Spain) **JA Rodríguez**	**7**	**6**
(South Africa) C Campbell	6	4
(Sweden) C Bergström	3	2
2	(Sweden) **S Edberg**	**6**	**6**

Second round
1	(Sweden) **M Wilander**	**6**	**6**
(Sweden) T Högstedt	4	2
(Sweden) P Carlsson	**7**	0	4
7	(West Germany) **E Jelen**	6	**6**	**6**
4	(Sweden) **M Pernfors**	**6**	**7**
(West Germany) D Keretić	3	6
WC	(Spain) D de Miguel	4	**7**	4
5	(Czechoslovakia) **M Mečíř**	**6**	6	**6**
6	(Spain) **E Sánchez**	**6**	**6**
Q	(Sweden) F Rosenquist	1	3
(Czechoslovakia) M Vajda	**6**	3	5
(Italy) **P Canè**	4	**6**	**7**
8	(Sweden) **U Stenlund**	2	**6**	**6**
(Czechoslovakia) S Birner	**6**	4	1
(Spain) JA Rodríguez	3	2
2	(Sweden) **S Edberg**	**6**	**6**

Quarterfinals
1	(Sweden) **M Wilander**	**6**	**6**
7	(West Germany) E Jelen	0	4
4	(Sweden) M Pernfors	4	2
5	(Czechoslovakia) **M Mečíř**	**6**	**6**
6	(Spain) **E Sánchez**	**6**	3	**6**
(Italy) P Canè	3	**6**	3
8	(Sweden) U Stenlund	0	**6**	2
2	(Sweden) **S Edberg**	**6**	0	**6**

Semifinals
1	(Sweden) **M Wilander**	**6**	5	**6**
5	(Czechoslovakia) M Mečíř	0	**7**	3
6	(Spain) **E Sánchez**	**6**	**6**
2	(Sweden) S Edberg	3	3

Final
1	(Sweden) M Wilander	6	**6**	4
6	(Spain) **E Sánchez**	**7**	4	**6**
