= 1989 Volvo Open =

- Date: July 31 – August 6 (men); July 24 – July 30 (women)
- Edition: 42nd
- Surface: Clay / outdoor
- Location: Båstad, Sweden

Champions

Men's singles
- (Italy) Paolo Canè

Women's singles
- (Bulgaria) Katerina Maleeva

Men's doubles
- (Sweden) Per Henricsson / (Sweden) Nicklas Utgren

Women's doubles
- (Argentina) Mercedes Paz / (Denmark) Tine Scheuer-Larsen
← 1988 ·	Volvo Open	· 1990 →

The 1989 Volvo Open was a tennis tournament played on outdoor clay courts in Båstad, Sweden that was part of the 1989 Nabisco Grand Prix and of Tier V of the 1989 WTA Tour. The men's tournament was held from 31 July until 6 August 1989, while the women's tournament was held from 24 July until 30 July 1989.

== Finals ==
=== Men's singles ===
(Italy) Paolo Canè defeated (Socialist Federal Republic of Yugoslavia) Bruno Orešar 7–6, 7–6

- It was Canè's only title of the year and the 5th of his career.

=== Women's singles ===
(Bulgaria) Katerina Maleeva defeated (West Germany) Sabine Hack 6–1, 6–3

- It was Maleeva's 1st title of the year and the 7th of her career.

=== Men's doubles ===
(Sweden) Per Henricsson / (Sweden) Nicklas Utgren defeated (Czechoslovakia) Josef Čihák / (Czechoslovakia) Karel Nováček 7–5, 6–2

- It was Henricsson's only title of the year and the 2nd of his career. It was Utgren's only title of the year and the 1st of his career.

=== Women's doubles ===
(Argentina) Mercedes Paz / (Denmark) Tine Scheuer-Larsen defeated (Socialist Federal Republic of Yugoslavia) Sabrina Goleš / (Bulgaria) Katerina Maleeva 6–2, 7–5

- It was Paz's 4th title of the year and the 16th of her career. It was Scheuer-Larsen's 2nd title of the year and the 6th of her career.
