= 1990 Australian Open – Men's singles =

Men's singles
- 1990 Australian Open

Final
- Champion: (Czechoslovakia) Ivan Lendl
- Runner-up: (Sweden) Stefan Edberg
- Score: 4–6, 7–6^{(7–3)}, 5–2 retired

Details
- Draw: 128
- Seeds: 16

Events
Singles	men	women		boys	girls
Doubles	men	women	mixed	boys	girls
WC Singles	men	women	quad
WC Doubles	men	women	quad
Legends	men	women	mixed
- Australian Open

Defending champion Ivan Lendl defeated Stefan Edberg in the final, 4–6, 7–6^{(7–3)}, 5–2 ret., to win the men's singles tennis title at the 1990 Australian Open. It was his second Australian Open title and eighth and last major singles title overall. Edberg was forced to retire during the final due to a torn stomach muscle. This marked the first occasion since the 1911 Wimbledon Championships that a man retired during the championship match of a singles major.

Former world No. 1 John McEnroe created controversy after he was disqualified from his fourth round match for unsportsmanlike conduct. He received a warning for intimidating a linesperson, a point penalty after smashing his racket, and was defaulted for arguing with and abusing the umpire, supervisor and tournament referee.

This tournament marked the first professional appearance of future Olympic champion Marc Rosset.

== Seeds ==
1. (Czechoslovakia) Ivan Lendl (champion)
2. (West Germany) Boris Becker (quarterfinals)
3. (Sweden) Stefan Edberg (final, retired because of a torn stomach muscle injury)^{[a]}
4. (United States) John McEnroe (fourth round, defaulted for unsportsmanlike conduct)^{[b]}
5. (United States) Aaron Krickstein (fourth round)
6. (United States) Tim Mayotte (first round)
7. (Spain) Emilio Sánchez (first round)
8. (Sweden) Mats Wilander (semifinals)

9. (Ecuador) Andrés Gómez (fourth round)
10. (West Germany) Carl-Uwe Steeb (first round)
11. (Soviet Union) Andrei Chesnokov (second round)
12. (France) Yannick Noah (semifinals)
13. (Spain) Sergi Bruguera (second round)
14. (United States) Jim Courier (second round)
15. (Austria) Thomas Muster (third round)
16. (Czechoslovakia) Miloslav Mečíř (fourth round)

Click on the seed number of a player to go to their draw section.

== Draw ==
Key

- Q = Qualifier
- WC = Wild card
- LL = Lucky loser
- Alt = Alternate
- ITF = ITF entry
- PR = Protected ranking
- SR = Special ranking
- SE = Special exempt
- JE = Junior exempt
- JR = Junior Accelerator Programme entrant
- CO = College Accelerator Programme entrant
- NG = Next Gen Accelerator Program entrant
- w/o = Walkover
- r = Retired
- d = Defaulted

=== Finals ===
Quarterfinals
1	(Czechoslovakia) Ivan Lendl	6	6	6
(Soviet Union) Andrei Cherkasov	3	2	3
(Sweden) Mikael Pernfors	3	5	2
12	(France) Yannick Noah	6	7	6
(United States) David Wheaton	5	6^{4}	6	2
3	(Sweden) Stefan Edberg	7	7^{7}	3	6
8	(Sweden) Mats Wilander	6	6	6
2	(West Germany) Boris Becker	4	4	2

Semifinals
1	(Czechoslovakia) Ivan Lendl	6	6	6
12	(France) Yannick Noah	4	1	2
3	(Sweden) Stefan Edberg	6	6	6
8	(Sweden) Mats Wilander	1	1	2

Final
1	(Czechoslovakia) Ivan Lendl (Note: Ivan Lendl won the final after No. 3 seed Stefan Edberg was forced to retire in the third set with a torn stomach muscle injury.)	4	7^{7}	5
3	(Sweden) Stefan Edberg	6	6^{3}	2^{r}

=== Top half ===
==== Section 1 ====
First round
1	(Czechoslovakia) I Lendl	6	6	6
(United States) J Pugh	3	2	4
(Spain) T Carbonell	6	7	6
Q	(Czechoslovakia) C Suk	4	5	3
(Czechoslovakia) K Nováček	6	6	2	6
Q	(Australia) M Brown	3	1	6	2
(France) É Winogradsky	6	7	6
(United States) T Wilkison	2	6	3
WC	(Australia) S Youl	4	7	6	6
(Canada) M Laurendeau	6	6	2	2
Q	(France) C Pioline	7	3	4	7	3
WC	(Australia) B Drewett	6	6	6	5	6
(South Africa) C van Rensburg	6	5	7	6
(France) J Potier	2	7	5	3
Q	(West Germany) P Vojtíšek	3	2	4
15	(Austria) T Muster	6	6	6

Second round
1	(Czechoslovakia) I Lendl	6	6	6
(Spain) T Carbonell	4	2	3
(Czechoslovakia) K Nováček	6	6	4	6
(France) É Winogradsky	4	1	6	3
WC	(Australia) S Youl	6	7	6
WC	(Australia) B Drewett	4	6	0
(South Africa) C van Rensburg	6	5	5	6	6
15	(Austria) T Muster	1	7	7	2	8

Third round
1	(Czechoslovakia) I Lendl	6	3	6	6
(Czechoslovakia) K Nováček	4	6	4	1
WC	(Australia) S Youl	3	6	6	6
15	(Austria) T Muster	6	4	3	2

Fourth round
1	(Czechoslovakia) I Lendl	6	6	6
WC	(Australia) S Youl	1	3	1

==== Section 2 ====
First round
9	(Ecuador) A Gómez	4	6	1	6	6
(Australia) D Cahill	6	3	6	2	3
(United States) T Witsken	4	1	4
(Socialist Federal Republic of Yugoslavia) B Orešar	6	6	6
(West Germany) M Stich	6	6	6
Q	(Australia) P Doohan	3	2	2
(United Kingdom) J Bates	7	1	4	2
(Mexico) L Lavalle	6	6	6	6
(Soviet Union) A Cherkasov	6	4	4	6	6
Q	(Japan) S Matsuoka	2	6	6	0	2
(United States) G Layendecker	6	7	6
(France) T Benhabiles	2	6	3
(United States) J Brown	3	3	1
(Soviet Union) A Volkov	6	6	6
(France) J-P Fleurian	6	6	6
7	(Spain) E Sánchez	2	4	4

Second round
9	(Ecuador) A Gómez	6	3	6	6
(Socialist Federal Republic of Yugoslavia) B Orešar	4	6	3	2
(West Germany) M Stich	6	6	2
(Mexico) L Lavalle	4	4	0^{r}
(Soviet Union) A Cherkasov	6	5	7	6
(United States) G Layendecker	4	7	5	0
(Soviet Union) A Volkov	4	6	5	6	2
(France) J-P Fleurian	6	1	7	2	6

Third round
9	(Ecuador) A Gómez	6	6	3	7
(West Germany) M Stich	4	3	6	6
(Soviet Union) A Cherkasov	6	6	7
(France) J-P Fleurian	4	4	5

Fourth round
9	(Ecuador) A Gómez	6	3	6	6
(Soviet Union) A Cherkasov	2	6	7	7

==== Section 3 ====
First round
4	(United States) J McEnroe	6	6	6
(France) T Tulasne	2	1	1
(Israel) A Mansdorf	6	4	4	7	3
(Austria) A Antonitsch	4	6	6	6	6
(Venezuela) N Pereira	6	7	4	6
Q	(Canada) C Pridham	4	6	6	3
(United States) D Goldie	6	6	6
WC	(Australia) D Patten	3	4	4
(Czechoslovakia) P Korda	7	6	6
(Switzerland) J Hlasek	6	0	3
(France) H Leconte	6	4	7	6
(Spain) F Roig	1	6	5	4
(Sweden) M Pernfors	6	6	6
(Socialist Federal Republic of Yugoslavia) S Živojinović	2	1	2
(United States) L Shiras	1	4	3
13	(Spain) S Bruguera	6	6	6

Second round
4	(United States) J McEnroe	6	6	6
(Austria) A Antonitsch	1	2	1
(Venezuela) N Pereira	2	4	3
(United States) D Goldie	6	6	6
(Czechoslovakia) P Korda	2	6	3	4
(France) H Leconte	6	4	6	6
(Sweden) M Pernfors	6	6	1	6
13	(Spain) S Bruguera	4	3	6	4

Third round
4	(United States) J McEnroe	6	6	6
(United States) D Goldie	3	2	2
(France) H Leconte	4	1	3
(Sweden) M Pernfors	6	6	6

Fourth round
4	(United States) J McEnroe	6	4	7	2^{d}
(Sweden) M Pernfors^{[b]}	1	6	5	4

==== Section 4 ====
First round
12	(France) Y Noah	4	7	6	4	7
(Socialist Federal Republic of Yugoslavia) G Prpić	6	6	2	6	5
(United States) R Reneberg	2	4	6	1
(Haiti) R Agénor	6	6	3	6
(South Africa) P Aldrich	2	4	2
(Sweden) C Bergström	6	6	6
(Israel) G Bloom	7	7	3	6
(Australia) J Fitzgerald	6	6	6	2
Q	(South Africa) N Broad	7	4	4	1
(Italy) C Pistolesi	5	6	6	6
(Netherlands) M Schapers	6	0	3	1
(Australia) T Woodbridge	4	6	6	6
(Spain) J Arrese	4	6	6	6
Q	(United Kingdom) N Brown	6	4	1	3
(United States) P Sampras	7	6	4	7	12
6	(United States) T Mayotte	6	7	6	5	10

Second round
12	(France) Y Noah	7	6	6
(Haiti) R Agénor	6	3	3
(Sweden) C Bergström	6	7	2	4	2
(Israel) G Bloom	2	5	6	6	6
(Italy) C Pistolesi	3	2	2
(Australia) T Woodbridge	6	6	6
(Spain) J Arrese	6	2	6	1	3
(United States) P Sampras	0	6	3	6	6

Third round
12	(France) Y Noah	6	6	6
(Israel) G Bloom	3	3	3
(Australia) T Woodbridge	5	4	2
(United States) P Sampras	7	6	6

Fourth round
12	(France) Y Noah	6	6	3	6
(United States) P Sampras	3	4	6	2

=== Bottom half ===
==== Section 5 ====
First round
5	(United States) A Krickstein	6	6	6	7
Q	(Italy) G Pozzi	4	7	4	5
(India) R Krishnan	4	7	6	5	6
(West Germany) M Zoecke	6	5	4	7	1
(Sweden) L-A Wahlgren	6	6	6
(Argentina) H de la Peña	3	1	3
Q	(Soviet Union) A Võsand	3	6	3	1
(West Germany) J Wöhrmann	6	2	6	6
(Socialist Federal Republic of Yugoslavia) G Ivanišević	5	5	0
(United States) D Wheaton	7	7	6
Q	(Sweden) M Larsson	6	6	6
(Switzerland) M Rosset	4	1	1
(Australia) M Woodforde	2	6	6	6
(Spain) JF Altur	6	1	4	4
(Australia) M Kratzmann	6	7	6	3	2
11	(Soviet Union) A Chesnokov	3	6	7	6	6

Second round
5	(United States) A Krickstein	6	4	6	6
(India) R Krishnan	1	6	3	1
(Sweden) L-A Wahlgren	4	7	7	6
(West Germany) J Wöhrmann	6	5	5	3
(United States) D Wheaton	6	6	3	6
Q	(Sweden) M Larsson	3	2	6	1
(Australia) M Woodforde	6	6	7
11	(Soviet Union) A Chesnokov	3	2	5

Third round
5	(United States) A Krickstein	6	6	6	6
(Sweden) L-A Wahlgren	7	2	3	2
(United States) D Wheaton^{[c]}	6	4
(Australia) M Woodforde	3	5^{r}

Fourth round
5	(United States) A Krickstein	6	4	3
(United States) D Wheaton	7	6	6

==== Section 6 ====
First round
14	(United States) J Courier	6	6	6
(United States) J Arias	3	3	1
(Sweden) J Svensson	6	7	7
(Sweden) T Högstedt	2	5	5
(Sweden) M Gustafsson	2
(Sweden) N Kulti	2^{r}
(Netherlands) T Nijssen	3	2	6
(Sweden) L Jönsson	6	6	7
(Sweden) J Gunnarsson	2	7	0	2
Q	(Italy) S Pescosolido	6	6	6	6
WC	(Australia) S Barr	0	7	3	4
(United States) P Chamberlin	6	6	6	6
(West Germany) P Kühnen	6	6	2	7	6
(Sweden) N Kroon	3	7	6	6	2
(Australia) J Anderson	6	3	4
3	(Sweden) S Edberg	7	6	6

Second round
14	(United States) J Courier	6	2	3	2
(Sweden) J Svensson	2	6	6	6
(Sweden) M Gustafsson	1	2	2
(Sweden) L Jönsson	6	6	6
Q	(Italy) S Pescosolido	7	5	3	4
(United States) P Chamberlin	6	7	6	6
(West Germany) P Kühnen	2	2	4
3	(Sweden) S Edberg	6	6	6

Third round
(Sweden) J Svensson	6	7	3	4	6
(Sweden) L Jönsson	4	5	6	6	2
(United States) P Chamberlin	3	4	1
3	(Sweden) S Edberg	6	6	6

Fourth round
(Sweden) J Svensson	2	2	4
3	(Sweden) S Edberg	6	6	6

==== Section 7 ====
First round
8	(Sweden) M Wilander	7	7	7
(Australia) R Fromberg	6	5	5
WC	(Australia) D Macpherson	3	7	6	1
(Canada) M Wostenholme	6	5	7	6
Q	(Nigeria) N Odizor	6	7	6
WC	(Australia) I Peter-Budge	2	5	2
(Australia) W Masur	6	6	6
(West Germany) E Jelen	2	1	2
(Finland) A Rahunen	0	3	1
(Spain) J Sánchez	6	6	6
(United States) P Annacone	6	6	6	2	6
(South Africa) G Muller	3	4	7	6	3
(France) G Forget	2	6	6	6
(Canada) G Connell	6	4	4	2
(Finland) V Paloheimo	5	6	0	6	6
10	(West Germany) C-U Steeb	7	3	6	2	2

Second round
8	(Sweden) M Wilander	6	7	6
(Canada) M Wostenholme	2	5	3
Q	(Nigeria) N Odizor	6	7	3	1
(Australia) W Masur	7	6	6	6
(Spain) J Sánchez	6	7	6
(United States) P Annacone	1	6	3
(France) G Forget	4	6	3	3
(Finland) V Paloheimo	6	3	6	6

Third round
8	(Sweden) M Wilander	6	5	6	1	6
(Australia) W Masur	4	7	4	6	3
(Spain) J Sánchez	5	4	6	1
(Finland) V Paloheimo	7	6	3	6

Fourth round
8	(Sweden) M Wilander	7	6	6
(Finland) V Paloheimo	5	4	0

==== Section 8 ====
First round
16	(Czechoslovakia) M Mečíř	6	6	7
(Netherlands) M Koevermans	2	4	6
Q	(Czechoslovakia) L Němeček	6	7	3	6
(Canada) A Sznajder	7	6	6	7
WC	(Australia) N Borwick	6	6	6
(New Zealand) K Evernden	3	1	1
Q	(West Germany) U Riglewski	6	6	2	6
(Italy) P Canè	2	3	6	2
(France) O Delaître	2	6	3	6	6
(Italy) O Camporese	6	3	6	4	3
(United States) K Jones	6	5	2	6	6
(Denmark) M Tauson	3	7	6	2	3
(United States) S Davis	6	6	6
WC	(Australia) J Morgan	2	2	2
(Netherlands) P Haarhuis	1	2	1
2	(West Germany) B Becker	6	6	6

Second round
16	(Czechoslovakia) M Mečíř	2	6	6	6
(Canada) A Sznajder	6	1	0	2
WC	(Australia) N Borwick	2	4	2
Q	(West Germany) U Riglewski	6	6	6
(France) O Delaître	6	4	6	6
(United States) K Jones	3	6	3	4
(United States) S Davis	3	6	6	2
2	(West Germany) B Becker	6	7	4	6

Third round
16	(Czechoslovakia) M Mečíř	6	6	6
Q	(West Germany) U Riglewski	4	2	0
(France) O Delaître	3	1	4
2	(West Germany) B Becker	6	6	6

Fourth round
16	(Czechoslovakia) M Mečíř	6	7	4	1	1
2	(West Germany) B Becker	4	6	6	6	6

== Notes ==
a. No. 1 seed Ivan Lendl won the final after No. 3 seed Stefan Edberg was forced to retire in the third set with a torn stomach muscle injury.
b. Mikael Pernfors advanced to the quarterfinals after No. 4 John McEnroe was defaulted in the fourth set by chair umpire Gerry Armstrong for unsportsmanlike conduct.
c. David Wheaton advanced to the fourth round after Mark Woodforde was forced to retire in the second set with a right ankle injury.

Preceded by 1989 US Open	Grand Slam men's singles	Succeeded by 1990 French Open
