= 1990 French Open – Men's singles =

Men's singles
- 1990 French Open

Final
- Champion: (Ecuador) Andrés Gómez
- Runner-up: (United States) Andre Agassi
- Score: 6–3, 2–6, 6–4, 6–4

Details
- Draw: 128
- Seeds: 16

Events
Singles	men	women		boys	girls
Doubles	men	women	mixed	boys	girls
WC Singles	men	women	quad
WC Doubles	men	women	quad
Legends	−45	45+	women
- French Open

Andrés Gómez defeated Andre Agassi in the final, 6–3, 2–6, 6–4, 6–4 to win the men's singles tennis title at the 1990 French Open. It was his first and only major singles title, becoming the first Ecuadorian to win a singles major.

Michael Chang was the defending champion, but was defeated by Agassi in the quarterfinals.

For the first time since the December 1977 Australian Open, none of the semifinalists at a major had previously won a major title. World No. 1 and three-time former champion Ivan Lendl elected to skip the tournament to prepare for Wimbledon, seeking to complete the career Grand Slam. Until the 2002 Australian Open, this would be the last time that the top two seeds lost in the first round of a major, with Stefan Edberg and Boris Becker falling in the opening round. This marked Becker's first defeat in the opening round of a major, having won his first 21 such matches.

== Seeds ==
1. (Sweden) Stefan Edberg (first round)
2. (West Germany) Boris Becker (first round)
3. (United States) Andre Agassi (final)
4. (Ecuador) Andrés Gómez (champion)
5. (United States) Aaron Krickstein (third round)
6. (Spain) Emilio Sánchez (first round)
7. (Austria) Thomas Muster (semifinals)
8. (Soviet Union) Andrei Chesnokov (fourth round)
9. (United States) Jay Berger (first round)
10. (Argentina) Martín Jaite (fourth round)
11. (United States) Michael Chang (quarterfinals)
12. (Spain) Juan Aguilera (second round)
13. (United States) Jim Courier (fourth round)
14. (Sweden) Magnus Gustafsson (fourth round)
15. (Argentina) Guillermo Pérez Roldán (fourth round)
16. (West Germany) ~~Carl-Uwe Steeb~~ (withdrew)

== Draw ==
Key

- Q = Qualifier
- WC = Wild card
- LL = Lucky loser
- Alt = Alternate
- ITF = ITF entry
- PR = Protected ranking
- SR = Special ranking
- SE = Special exempt
- JE = Junior exempt
- JR = Junior Accelerator Programme entrant
- CO = College Accelerator Programme entrant
- NG = Next Gen Accelerator Program entrant
- w/o = Walkover
- r = Retired
- d = Defaulted

=== Finals ===
Quarterfinals
(Sweden) Jonas Svensson	3	7	6	6
WC	(France) Henri Leconte	6	5	3	4
3	(United States) Andre Agassi	6	6	4	6
11	(United States) Michael Chang	2	1	6	2
Q	(France) Thierry Champion	3	3	4
4	(Ecuador) Andrés Gómez	6	6	6
7	(Austria) Thomas Muster	6	4	6	6
(Socialist Federal Republic of Yugoslavia) Goran Ivanišević	2	6	4	3

Semifinals
(Sweden) Jonas Svensson	1	4	6	3
3	(United States) Andre Agassi	6	6	3	6
4	(Ecuador) Andrés Gómez	7	6	7
7	(Austria) Thomas Muster	5	1	5

Final
3	(United States) Andre Agassi	3	6	4	4
4	(Ecuador) Andrés Gómez	6	2	6	6

=== Top half ===
==== Section 1 ====
First round
1	(Sweden) S Edberg	4	2	1
(Spain) S Bruguera	6	6	6
(Sweden) J Svensson	6	3	6	6
(France) J Potier	4	6	1	2
Q	(Argentina) R Azar	6	6	6
(United States) L Duncan	3	1	1
(Czechoslovakia) M Střelba	6	6	4	6
(United States) K Jones	1	3	6	3
WC	(France) C Pioline	6	3	1
(Canada) A Sznajder	7	6	6
(France) Y Noah	6	4	6	1	7
Q	(Spain) F Clavet	4	6	4	6	5
Q	(France) F Vitoux	0	4	4
(Soviet Union) A Cherkasov	6	6	6
WC	(France) O Soules	7	1	3	2
15	(Argentina) G Pérez Roldán	6	6	6	6

Second round
(Spain) S Bruguera	6	6	4	4	0
(Sweden) J Svensson	2	2	6	6	6
Q	(Argentina) R Azar	3	6	4	6	6
(Czechoslovakia) M Střelba	6	4	6	3	4
(Canada) A Sznajder	4	7	4	4
(France) Y Noah	6	5	6	6
(Soviet Union) A Cherkasov	5	4	3
15	(Argentina) G Pérez Roldán	7	6	6

Third round
(Sweden) J Svensson	5	6	6	7
Q	(Argentina) R Azar	7	4	1	6
(France) Y Noah	6	4	6	3
15	(Argentina) G Pérez Roldán	7	6	4	6

Fourth round
(Sweden) J Svensson	2	6	6	6
15	(Argentina) G Pérez Roldán	6	4	2	2

==== Section 2 ====
First round
9	(United States) J Berger	4	2	2
(Argentina) A Mancini	6	6	6
Q	(Mexico) F Maciel	2	1	2
(Argentina) F Davín	6	6	6
(West Germany) E Jelen	6	6	6	1	4
(Socialist Federal Republic of Yugoslavia) B Orešar	7	4	2	6	6
WC	(France) H Leconte	6	6	6
(Haiti) R Agénor	4	2	4
(Spain) J Arrese	6	3	6	6
LL	(West Germany) M Zoecke	4	6	3	1
WC	(France) F Santoro	6	6	6
WC	(France) G Raoux	1	4	4
(France) J-P Fleurian	6	6	6
(Czechoslovakia) M Vajda	2	4	1
(West Germany) U Riglewski	1	1	3
8	(Soviet Union) A Chesnokov	6	6	6

Second round
(Argentina) A Mancini	3	7	5	1
(Argentina) F Davín	6	5	7	6
(Socialist Federal Republic of Yugoslavia) B Orešar	4	2	1
WC	(France) H Leconte	6	6	6
(Spain) J Arrese	4	6	6	6
WC	(France) F Santoro	6	3	2	2
(France) J-P Fleurian	6	2	0
8	(Soviet Union) A Chesnokov	7	6	6

Third round
(Argentina) F Davín	3	6	4
WC	(France) H Leconte	6	7	6
(Spain) J Arrese	5	4	2
8	(Soviet Union) A Chesnokov	7	6	6

Fourth round
WC	(France) H Leconte	6	6	4	2	6
8	(Soviet Union) A Chesnokov	4	3	6	6	3

==== Section 3 ====
First round
3	(United States) A Agassi	4	7	6	6
(Canada) M Wostenholme	6	6	0	1
WC	(Iran) M Bahrami	6	1	6	3	6
Q	(Australia) T Woodbridge	2	6	4	6	8
(Israel) G Bloom	5	7	1	6	6
(Australia) R Fromberg	7	5	6	3	2
(Australia) M Kratzmann	4	0	3
Q	(France) A Boetsch	6	6	6
Q	(Portugal) N Marques	6	7	6
(Argentina) C Miniussi	1	6	2
(France) O Delaître	4	5	1
(Australia) J Anderson	6	7	6
(Czechoslovakia) M Šrejber	3	5	6	7	6
(United States) D Wheaton	6	7	3	6	3
(Spain) JF Altur	1	6	3	4
13	(United States) J Courier	6	4	6	6

Second round
3	(United States) A Agassi	7	6	6
Q	(Australia) T Woodbridge	5	1	3
(Israel) G Bloom	2	1	0
Q	(France) A Boetsch	6	6	6
Q	(Portugal) N Marques	5	3	1
(Australia) J Anderson	7	6	6
(Czechoslovakia) M Šrejber	6	1	6	2
13	(United States) J Courier	7	6	2	6

Third round
3	(United States) A Agassi	6	6	6
Q	(France) A Boetsch	3	2	0
(Australia) J Anderson	0	2	1
13	(United States) J Courier	6	6	6

Fourth round
3	(United States) A Agassi	6	6	6	6
13	(United States) J Courier	7	1	4	0

==== Section 4 ====
First round
11	(United States) M Chang	6	7	6
(Brazil) C Motta	2	6	1
(Switzerland) M Rosset	3	6	6	6
LL	(Spain) F Roig	6	3	4	4
Q	(Sweden) C Bergström	6	6	6
(United States) T Witsken	1	2	0
(United States) T Wilkison	6	6	4	6
(Czechoslovakia) M Mečíř	4	1	6	4
Q	(Argentina) M Ingaramo	1	6	2	6
(Spain) J Sánchez	6	3	6	7
(Australia) S Youl	5	3	1
Q	(Chile) P Rebolledo	7	6	6
(Sweden) P Lundgren	6	6	6	5	2
(Switzerland) J Hlasek	3	7	2	7	6
Q	(Sweden) N Kulti	4	6	6	6	6
6	(Spain) E Sánchez	6	4	7	2	1

Second round
11	(United States) M Chang	7	4	6	6
(Switzerland) M Rosset	5	6	4	3
Q	(Sweden) C Bergström	6	6	6
(United States) T Wilkison	4	2	1
(Spain) J Sánchez	6	7	6
Q	(Chile) P Rebolledo	4	6	2
(Switzerland) J Hlasek	2	4	4
Q	(Sweden) N Kulti	6	6	6

Third round
11	(United States) M Chang	2	5	6	6	6
Q	(Sweden) C Bergström	6	7	0	2	4
(Spain) J Sánchez	6	6	6
Q	(Sweden) N Kulti	4	4	3

Fourth round
11	(United States) M Chang	6	6	6
(Spain) J Sánchez	4	4	2

=== Bottom half ===
==== Section 5 ====
First round
5	(United States) A Krickstein	6	2	6	6
(Peru) J Yzaga	0	6	3	3
Q	(France) S Grenier	6	6	6
(United Kingdom) J Bates	2	4	2
(United States) R Matuszewski	4	1	4
(Brazil) L Mattar	6	6	6
(United States) S Davis	3	2	2
(Czechoslovakia) K Nováček	6	6	6
(United States) D Rostagno	3	6	3
(Austria) A Antonitsch	6	7	6
(United States) R Reneberg	6	4	4	4
(France) G Forget	3	6	6	6
Q	(France) T Champion	6	3	6	6
(Socialist Federal Republic of Yugoslavia) G Prpić	4	6	3	3
(United States) M Washington	5	6	1	2
12	(Spain) J Aguilera	7	4	6	6

Second round
5	(United States) A Krickstein	6	6	7
Q	(France) S Grenier	3	4	5
(Brazil) L Mattar	7	3	2	1
(Czechoslovakia) K Nováček	5	6	6	6
(Austria) A Antonitsch	1	1	1
(France) G Forget	6	6	6
Q	(France) T Champion	3	6	6	6
12	(Spain) J Aguilera	6	3	3	2

Third round
5	(United States) A Krickstein	2	3	6	6
(Czechoslovakia) K Nováček	6	6	3	7
(France) G Forget	4	7	4	7	3
Q	(France) T Champion	6	6	6	5	6

Fourth round
(Czechoslovakia) K Nováček	3	6	6	6	3
Q	(France) T Champion	6	4	3	7	6

==== Section 6 ====
First round
14	(Sweden) M Gustafsson	6	5	4	6	6
(Spain) T Carbonell	4	7	6	4	2
(Czechoslovakia) P Korda	6	6	2	6
(Finland) V Paloheimo	4	1	6	3
WC	(France) T Benhabiles	2	3	4
(Italy) O Camporese	6	6	6
(Sweden) T Högstedt	1	4	0	r
(Uruguay) D Pérez	6	6	1
(Venezuela) N Pereira	4	0	6	4
(Soviet Union) A V Volkov	6	6	4	6
(United States) J Arias	6	6	3	6
Q	(Czechoslovakia) D Rikl	2	1	6	2
(Uruguay) M Filippini	4	6	6	6
(Sweden) L-A Wahlgren	6	0	1	0
(Spain) F Luna	6	1	6
4	(Ecuador) A Gómez	7	6	7

Second round
14	(Sweden) M Gustafsson	3	7	1	6	9
(Czechoslovakia) P Korda	6	6	6	1	7
(Italy) O Camporese	6	6	3	6	2
(Uruguay) D Pérez	3	7	6	4	6
(Soviet Union) AV Volkov	1	6	6	4	6
(United States) J Arias	6	3	3	6	1
(Uruguay) M Filippini	6	2	1
4	(Ecuador) A Gómez	7	6	6

Third round
14	(Sweden) M Gustafsson	6	4	6	6
(Uruguay) D Pérez	1	6	1	3
(Soviet Union) AV Volkov	2	5	6	3
4	(Ecuador) A Gómez	6	7	4	6

Fourth round
14	(Sweden) M Gustafsson
4	(Ecuador) A Gómez	w/o

==== Section 7 ====
First round
7	(Austria) T Muster	7	6	6
(Sweden) L Jönsson	5	3	2
WC	(France) E Winogradsky	6	6	6
Q	(West Germany) H Schwaier	4	1	3
(Netherlands) P Haarhuis	6	6	6
(United States) J Grabb	3	3	2
(United States) J Pugh	6	6	1
(France) T Tulasne	4	3	0	r
(Canada) G Connell	6	1	4	0
(Finland) A Rahunen	1	6	6	6
(United States) L Shiras	7	6	3	3	6
(Socialist Federal Republic of Yugoslavia) S Živojinović	6	4	6	6	4
(United States) J Rive	4	1	1
(West Germany) M Stich	6	6	6
(Italy) C Pistolesi	2	6	2
10	(Argentina) M Jaite	6	7	6

Second round
7	(Austria) T Muster	6	6	6
WC	(France) E Winogradsky	2	3	1
(Netherlands) P Haarhuis	6	7	6	6	7
(United States) J Pugh	4	6	7	7	5
(Finland) A Rahunen	6	6	6
(United States) L Shiras	0	1	1
(Germany) M Stich	7	4	7	4	3
10	(Argentina) M Jaite	6	6	6	6	6

Third round
7	(Austria) T Muster	3	7	6	7
(Netherlands) P Haarhuis	6	5	2	6
(Finland) A Rahunen	6	2	1
10	(Argentina) M Jaite	7	6	6

Fourth round
7	(Austria) T Muster	7	6	6
10	(Argentina) M Jaite	6	3	2

==== Section 8 ====
First round
LL	(Cuba) M Tabares	3	6	4	4
(Israel) A Mansdorf	6	4	6	6
(Italy) F Cancellotti	6	6	3	7
(India) R Krishnan	4	4	6	6
(Sweden) N Kroon	7	6	6
(United States) D Goldie	6	3	1
(Netherlands) M Schapers	4	3	1
(Australia) J Stoltenberg	6	6	6
(Netherlands) M Koevermans	6	2	6	6	7
(Sweden) J Gunnarsson	3	6	7	3	5
Q	(Sweden) D Engel	3	1	2
(West Germany) P Kühnen	6	6	6
(Australia) D Cahill	2	6	1	7	3
(Sweden) A Järryd	6	4	6	6	6
(Socialist Federal Republic of Yugoslavia) G Ivanišević	5	6	7	6
2	(West Germany) B Becker	7	4	5	2

Second round
(Israel) A Mansdorf	6	2	6	7
(Italy) F Cancellotti	2	6	1	5
(Sweden) N Kroon	6	6	6
(Australia) J Stoltenberg	0	2	3
(Netherlands) M Koevermans	3	6	4	2
(Germany) P Kühnen	6	2	6	6
(Sweden) A Järryd	3	0	2
(Socialist Federal Republic of Yugoslavia) G Ivanišević	6	6	6

Third round
(Israel) A Mansdorf	4	6	1
(Sweden) N Kroon	6	7	6
(Germany) P Kühnen	6	1	5
(Socialist Federal Republic of Yugoslavia) G Ivanišević	7	6	7

Fourth round
(Sweden) N Kroon	2	4	5
(Socialist Federal Republic of Yugoslavia) G Ivanišević	6	6	7

Preceded by 1990 Australian Open – Men's singles	Grand Slam men's singles	Succeeded by 1990 Wimbledon Championships – Men's singles
