= 1989 Volvo Open – Women's doubles =

Women's doubles
- 1989 Volvo Open
- 1988 Champions: (Italy) Sandra Cecchini; (Argentina) Mercedes Paz

Final
- Champions: (Argentina) Mercedes Paz; (Denmark) Tine Scheuer-Larsen
- Runners-up: (Socialist Federal Republic of Yugoslavia) Sabrina Goleš; (Bulgaria) Katerina Maleeva
- Score: 6–2, 7–5

Events
Singles	men	women
Doubles	men	women
← 1988 ·	Swedish Open	· 1990 →

In the 1989 Volvo Open women's doubles tennis tournament, Sandra Cecchini and Mercedes Paz were the defending champions but only Paz competed that year with Tine Scheuer-Larsen.

Paz and Scheuer-Larsen won in the final 6–2, 7–5 against Sabrina Goleš and Katerina Maleeva.

== Seeds ==
Champion seeds are indicated in bold text while text in italics indicates the round in which those seeds were eliminated.

1. (Argentina) **Mercedes Paz** / (Denmark) **Tine Scheuer-Larsen (champions)**
2. (Socialist Federal Republic of Yugoslavia) Sabrina Goleš / (Bulgaria) Katerina Maleeva (final)
3. (Sweden) Cecilia Dahlman / (Netherlands) Simone Schilder (semifinals)
4. (Austria) Barbara Paulus / (Czechoslovakia) Radka Zrubáková (semifinals)

== Draw ==
=== Key ===
- Q = Qualifier
- WC = Wild card
- LL = Lucky loser
- Alt = Alternate
- SE = Special exempt
- PR = Protected ranking
- ITF = ITF entry
- JE = Junior exempt
- w/o = Walkover
- r = Retired
- d = Defaulted
- SR = Special ranking

First round

Quarterfinals

Semifinals

Final

1
- (Argentina) **M Paz**
- (Denmark) **T Scheuer-Larsen**
**6**
**6**

- (Finland) N Dahlman
- (United States) E Zimmerman
2
1

1
- (Argentina) **M Paz**
- (Denmark) **T Scheuer-Larsen**
**6**
**6**

- (Czechoslovakia) **L Lásková**
- (Soviet Union) **N Medvedeva**
**6**
**6**

- (Czechoslovakia) L Lásková
- (Soviet Union) N Medvedeva
1
2

- (Sweden) H Jonsson
- (Sweden) M Nilsson
3
3

1
- (Argentina) **M Paz**
- (Denmark) **T Scheuer-Larsen**
**6**
**7**

3
- (Sweden) **C Dahlman**
- (Netherlands) **S Schilder**
**6**
2
**6**

3
- (Sweden) C Dahlman
- (Netherlands) S Schilder
4
5

- (Czechoslovakia) I Budařová
- (Czechoslovakia) R Rajchrtová
1
**6**
4

3
- (Sweden) **C Dahlman**
- (Netherlands) **S Schilder**
**6**
**6**

- (Sweden) N Eriksson
- (Sweden) M Salsgard
0
2

- (West Germany) S Meier
- (Sweden) M Strandlund
3
2

- (West Germany) **S Meier**
- (Sweden) **M Strandlund**
**6**
**6**

1
- (Argentina) **Mercedes Paz**
- (Denmark) **Tine Scheuer-Larsen**
**6**
**7**

- (Sweden) **C Bernstein**
- (Sweden) **A Narbe**
2
**7**
**7**

2
- (Socialist Federal Republic of Yugoslavia) Sabrina Goleš
- (Bulgaria) Katerina Maleeva
2
5

- (Finland) N Dahlman
- (Italy) M Grossi
**6**
5
5

- (Sweden) C Bernstein
- (Sweden) A Narbe
4
**6**
5

- (Sweden) M Ekstrand
- (West Germany) E-M Schürhoff
5
5

4
- (Austria) **B Paulus**
- (Czechoslovakia) **R Zrubáková**
**6**
4
**7**

4
- (Austria) **B Paulus**
- (Czechoslovakia) **R Zrubáková**
**7**
**7**

4
- (Austria) B Paulus
- (Czechoslovakia) R Zrubáková

- (Sweden) M Hardling
- (Sweden) P Johansson
0
2

2
- (Socialist Federal Republic of Yugoslavia) **S Goleš**
- (Bulgaria) **K Maleeva**
**w/o**

- (Italy) **C Caverzasio**
- (Austria) **P Ritter**
**6**
**6**

- (Italy) C Caverzasio
- (Austria) P Ritter
3
1

- (West Germany) C Hofmann
- (United States) J Joseph
4
2

2
- (Socialist Federal Republic of Yugoslavia) **S Goleš**
- (Bulgaria) **K Maleeva**
**6**
**6**

2
- (Socialist Federal Republic of Yugoslavia) **S Goleš**
- (Bulgaria) **K Maleeva**
**6**
**6**
