= 1989 Volvo Open – Men's singles =

Men's singles
- 1989 Volvo Open

Final
- Champion: (Italy) Paolo Canè
- Runner-up: (Socialist Federal Republic of Yugoslavia) Bruno Orešar
- Score: 7–6^{(7–4)}, 7–6^{(7–5)}

Details
- Draw: 32 (3WC/4Q/1LL)
- Seeds: 8

Events
Singles	men	women
Doubles	men	women
- Swedish Open

Marcelo Filippini was the defending champion, but lost in the second round to Nicklas Kulti.

Paolo Canè won the title by defeating Bruno Orešar 7–6^{(7–4)}, 7–6^{(7–5)} in the final.

== Seeds ==
1. (Czechoslovakia) Miloslav Mečíř (first round)
2. (Sweden) Mikael Pernfors (first round)
3. (Sweden) Jonas Svensson (second round)
4. (Spain) Jordi Arrese (first round)
5. (Italy) Paolo Canè (final)
6. (Ecuador) Andrés Gómez (first round)
7. (Sweden) Magnus Gustafsson (quarterfinals)
8. (Uruguay) Marcelo Filippini (second round)

== Draw ==
Key

- Q = Qualifier
- WC = Wild card
- LL = Lucky loser
- Alt = Alternate
- ITF = ITF entry
- PR = Protected ranking
- SR = Special ranking
- SE = Special exempt
- JE = Junior exempt
- JR = Junior Accelerator Programme entrant
- CO = College Accelerator Programme entrant
- NG = Next Gen Accelerator Program entrant
- w/o = Walkover
- r = Retired
- d = Defaulted

=== Finals ===
Semifinals
Q	(Australia) Johan Anderson	6	2
(Socialist Federal Republic of Yugoslavia) Bruno Orešar	7	6
5	(Italy) Paolo Canè	6	6
(Sweden) Nicklas Kulti	4	2

Final
(Socialist Federal Republic of Yugoslavia) Bruno Orešar	6^{4}	6^{5}
5	(Italy) Paolo Canè	7^{7}	7^{7}

=== Top half ===
First round
1	(Slovakia) M Mečíř	4	6	1
Q	(Australia) J Anderson	6	4	6
WC	(Sweden) M Larsson	1	6	4
(Sweden) T Nydahl	6	1	6
(Canada) M Wostenholme	1	1
(Czech Republic) J Čihák	6	6
(Sweden) T Haldin	4	1
7	(Sweden) M Gustafsson	6	6
3	(Sweden) J Svensson	6	6
Q	(Sweden) P Henricsson	3	2
(Socialist Federal Republic of Yugoslavia) B Orešar	6	3	7
Q	(Sweden) R Båthman	2	6	6
WC	(Sweden) N Utgren	6	6
(Japan) S Matsuoka	1	0
(Czech Republic) K Nováček	6	6
6	(Ecuador) A Gómez	3	4

Second round
Q	(Australia) J Anderson	6	6
(Sweden) T Nydahl	4	1
(Czech Republic) J Čihák	2	4
7	(Sweden) M Gustafsson	6	6
3	(Sweden) J Svensson	6	2	0
(Socialist Federal Republic of Yugoslavia) B Orešar	2	6	6
WC	(Sweden) N Utgren	4	3
(Czech Republic) K Nováček	6	6

Quarterfinals
Q	(Australia) J Anderson	4	6	7
7	(Sweden) M Gustafsson	6	3	6
(Socialist Federal Republic of Yugoslavia) B Orešar	6	6
(Czech Republic) K Nováček	4	1

Semifinals
Q	(Australia) J Anderson	6	2
(Socialist Federal Republic of Yugoslavia) B Orešar	7	6

=== Bottom half ===
First round
5	(Italy) P Canè	7	7
(Sweden) N Kroon	6	6
(Sweden) L Jönsson	4	5
(Sweden) C Allgårdh	6	7
(Sweden) P Nyborg	1	5
(Sweden) C Bergström	6	7
(Denmark) M Tauson	6	6	6
4	(Spain) J Arrese	3	7	3
8	(Uruguay) M Filippini	6	6
(Sweden) T Svantesson	3	4
(Argentina) G Rivas	3	7	2
(Sweden) N Kulti	6	6	6
Q	(Sweden) D Engel	6	7
LL	(Sweden) M Zeile	3	5
WC	(Sweden) J Nyström	6	6
2	(Sweden) M Pernfors	2	4

Second round
5	(Italy) P Canè	6	7
(Sweden) C Allgårdh	3	5
(Sweden) C Bergström	6	6
(Denmark) M Tauson	4	2
8	(Uruguay) M Filippini	4	2
(Sweden) N Kulti	6	6
Q	(Sweden) D Engel	4	6	3
WC	(Sweden) J Nyström	6	4	6

Quarterfinals
5	(Italy) P Canè	4	6	6
(Sweden) C Bergström	6	2	4
(Sweden) N Kulti	6	6
WC	(Sweden) J Nyström	2	4

Semifinals
5	(Italy) P Canè	6	6
(Sweden) N Kulti	4	2
