= Tauson =

Tauson is a surname. Notable people with the surname include:

- Clara Tauson (born 2002), Danish tennis player
- Michael Tauson (born 1966), Danish tennis player
