= 1990 Geneva Open =

- Date: 10–17 September
- Edition: 11th
- Category: World Series (Free Week)
- Draw: 32S / 16D
- Prize money: $225,000
- Surface: Clay / outdoor
- Location: Geneva, Switzerland

Champions

Singles
- (Austria) Horst Skoff

Doubles
- (Argentina) Pablo Albano / (Sweden) David Engel
- Geneva Open

The 1990 Geneva Open was a men's tennis tournament played on outdoor clay courts that was part of the World Series of the 1990 ATP Tour. It was the 11th edition of the tournament and was played at Geneva in Switzerland from 10 September through 17 September 1990. Second-seeded Horst Skoff won the singles title.

== Finals ==
=== Singles ===
(Austria) Horst Skoff defeated (Spain) Sergi Bruguera 7–6^{(10–8)}, 7–6^{(7–4)}

- It was Skoff's only title of the year and the 5th of his career.

=== Doubles ===
(Argentina) Pablo Albano / (Sweden) David Engel defeated (Australia) Neil Borwick / (New Zealand) David Lewis 6–3, 7–6

- It was Albano's only title of the year and the 1st of his career. It was Engel's only title of the year and the 1st of his career.
