= 1988 Swedish Open – Women's singles =

Women's singles
- 1988 Swedish Open
- 1987 Champion: (Italy) Sandra Cecchini

Final
- Champion: (West Germany) Isabel Cueto
- Runner-up: (Italy) Sandra Cecchini
- Score: 7–5, 6–1

Events
Singles	men	women
Doubles	men	women
← 1987 ·	Swedish Open	· 1989 →

Sandra Cecchini was the defending champion but lost in the final 7–5, 6–1 against Isabel Cueto.

== Seeds ==
A champion seed is indicated in bold text while text in italics indicates the round in which that seed was eliminated.

1. (Italy) Sandra Cecchini (final)
2. (Sweden) Catarina Lindqvist (second round)
3. n/a
4. (Austria) Judith Wiesner (second round)
5. (Argentina) Bettina Fulco (second round)
6. (West Germany) **Isabel Cueto (champion)**
7. (United States) Kathleen Horvath (first round)
8. (Brazil) Neige Dias (semifinals)

== Draw ==
=== Key ===
- Q = Qualifier
- WC = Wild card
- LL = Lucky loser
- Alt = Alternate
- SE = Special exempt
- PR = Protected ranking
- ITF = ITF entry
- JE = Junior exempt
- w/o = Walkover
- r = Retired
- d = Defaulted
- SR = Special ranking

First round
1	(Italy) **S Cecchini**	**6**	**6**
(Italy) F Bonsignori	2	2
(Netherlands) **N Jagerman**	**7**	**6**
(Switzerland) C Cohen	5	3
Q	(Sweden) A Narbe	2	**7**	2
(Argentina) **M Paz**	**6**	6	**6**
Q	(Czechoslovakia) R Maršíková	2	1
5	(Argentina) **B Fulco**	**6**	**6**
LL	(Italy) S La Fratta	1	1
(Italy) **L Lapi**	**6**	**6**
(Sweden) **M Strandlund**	2	**6**	**6**
(Italy) L Garrone	**6**	3	2
Q	(France) S Niox-Chateau	**6**	3	4
(Argentina) **A Villagrán**	3	**6**	**6**
Q	(Norway) A Jönsson	**6**	4	4
8	(Brazil) **N Dias**	4	**6**	**6**
7	(United States) K Horvath	1	3
(Greece) **A Kanellopoulou**	**6**	**6**
(Belgium) **S Wasserman**	4	**6**	**7**
(Italy) L Ferrando	**6**	2	6
(Brazil) P Medrado	3	**6**	2
(Sweden) **C Dahlman**	**6**	4	**6**
(Greece) O Tsarbopoulou	5	3
4	(Austria) **J Wiesner**	**7**	**6**
6	(West Germany) **I Cueto**	**6**	**6**
(United States) M Torres	2	2
(Sweden) **M Lindström**	**6**	**6**
(Italy) B Romanò	3	4
(Sweden) J Jonerup	4	1
(United States) **G Magers**	**6**	**6**
(Belgium) A Devries	5	**7**	2
2	(Sweden) **C Lindqvist**	**7**	6	**6**

Second round
1	(Italy) **S Cecchini**	**6**	**7**
(Netherlands) N Jagerman	2	6
(Argentina) **M Paz**	4	**6**	**6**
5	(Argentina) B Fulco	**6**	3	3
(Italy) **L Lapi**	**6**	**6**
(Sweden) M Strandlund	4	3
(Argentina) A Villagrán	2	0
8	(Brazil) **N Dias**	**6**	**6**
(Greece) A Kanellopoulou	4	5
(Belgium) **S Wasserman**	**6**	**7**
(Sweden) **C Dahlman**	**6**	**6**
4	(Austria) J Wiesner	4	2
6	(West Germany) **I Cueto**	**7**	6	**6**
(Sweden) M Lindström	5	**7**	3
(United States) **G Magers**	**6**	**6**
2	(Sweden) C Lindqvist	2	3

Quarterfinals
1	(Italy) **S Cecchini**	**6**	**6**
(Argentina) M Paz	3	3
(Italy) L Lapi	2	3
8	(Brazil) **N Dias**	**6**	**6**
(Belgium) **S Wasserman**	**6**	**7**
(Sweden) C Dahlman	2	6
6	(West Germany) **I Cueto**	**6**	4	**7**
(United States) G Magers	3	**6**	5

Semifinals
1	(Italy) **S Cecchini**	1	**6**	**6**
8	(Brazil) N Dias	**6**	3	3
(Belgium) S Wasserman	4	**6**	4
6	(West Germany) **I Cueto**	**6**	4	**6**

Final
1	(Italy) Sandra Cecchini	5	1
6	(West Germany) **Isabel Cueto**	**7**	**6**
