= 1991 Geneva Open – Doubles =

Doubles
- 1991 Geneva Open

Final
- Champions: (Spain) Sergi Bruguera (Switzerland) Marc Rosset
- Runners-up: (Sweden) Per Henricsson (Sweden) Ola Jonsson
- Score: 3–6, 6–3, 6–2

Details
- Draw: 16
- Seeds: 4

Events
Singles	Doubles
← 1990 ·	Geneva Open	· 1992 →

Pablo Albano and David Engel were the defending champions, but did not participate this year.

Sergi Bruguera and Marc Rosset won the title, defeating Per Henricsson and Ola Jonsson 3–6, 6–3, 6–2 in the final.

== Seeds ==
1. (Spain) Marcos Aurelio Gorriz / (Belgium) Libor Pimek (quarterfinals)
2. (Brazil) Luiz Mattar / (Brazil) Jaime Oncins (quarterfinals, withdrew)
3. (Czechoslovakia) Vojtěch Flégl / (Croatia) Goran Prpić (first round)
4. (Argentina) Horacio de la Peña / (Italy) Diego Nargiso (first round)

== Draw ==
=== Key ===
- Q = Qualifier
- WC = Wild card
- LL = Lucky loser
- Alt = Alternate
- SE = Special exempt
- PR = Protected ranking
- ITF = ITF entry
- JE = Junior exempt
- w/o = Walkover
- r = Retired
- d = Defaulted
- SR = Special ranking

=== Draw ===
First round
1	(Spain) M A Górriz (Belgium) L Pimek	5	6	6
(Spain) J Clavet (United States) M Jensen	7	4	4
Q	(United States) M Bauer (Sweden) J Gunnarsson	2	6	6
(Argentina) G Garetto (Argentina) M Ingaramo	6	3	2
4	(Argentina) H de la Peña (Italy) D Nargiso	3	4
WC	(Soviet Union) A Cherkasov (Soviet Union) A Medvedev	6	6
(Sweden) P Henricsson (Sweden) O Jonsson	6	4	6
(Belgium) E Masso (Argentina) G Mirad	1	6	2
(Spain) J Arrese (Spain) G López	4	6
(Netherlands) M Oosting (Finland) O Rahnasto	6	7
(Sweden) J Donar (New Zealand) S Guy	6	6
3	(Czechoslovakia) V Flégl (Croatia) G Prpić	4	4
(Israel) G Bloom (Argentina) C Miniussi	0	6
(Spain) S Bruguera (Switzerland) M Rosset	6	7
(Italy) R Furlan (Switzerland) C Mezzadri	2	2
2	(Brazil) L Mattar (Brazil) J Oncins	6	6

Quarterfinals
1	(Spain) M A Górriz (Belgium) L Pimek	3	4
Q	(United States) M Bauer (Sweden) J Gunnarsson	6	6
WC	(Soviet Union) A Cherkasov (Soviet Union) A Medvedev	0	6
(Sweden) P Henricsson (Sweden) O Jonsson	6	7
(Netherlands) M Oosting (Finland) O Rahnasto	6	6	6
(Sweden) J Donar (New Zealand) S Guy	1	7	3
(Spain) S Bruguera (Switzerland) M Rosset	w/o
2	(Brazil) L Mattar (Brazil) J Oncins

Semifinals
Q	(United States) M Bauer (Sweden) J Gunnarsson	1	5
(Sweden) P Henricsson (Sweden) O Jonsson	6	7
(Netherlands) M Oosting (Finland) O Rahnasto	6	1	4
(Spain) S Bruguera (Switzerland) M Rosset	3	6	6

Final
(Sweden) P Henricsson (Sweden) O Jonsson	6	3	2
(Spain) S Bruguera (Switzerland) M Rosset	3	6	6
