= 1988 Swedish Open – Women's doubles =

Women's doubles
- 1988 Swedish Open
- 1987 Champions: (United States) Penny Barg (Denmark) Tine Scheuer-Larsen

Final
- Champions: (Italy) Sandra Cecchini (Argentina) Mercedes Paz
- Runners-up: (Italy) Linda Ferrando (Italy) Silvia La Fratta
- Score: 6–0, 6–2

Events
Singles	men	women
Doubles	men	women
← 1987 ·	Swedish Open	· 1989 →

Penny Barg and Tine Scheuer-Larsen were the defending champions but did not compete that year.

Sandra Cecchini and Mercedes Paz won in the final 6–0, 6–2 against Linda Ferrando and Silvia La Fratta.

== Seeds ==
Champion seeds are indicated in bold text while text in italics indicates the round in which those seeds were eliminated.

1. (Sweden) Catarina Lindqvist / (Sweden) Maria Lindström (quarterfinals)
2. (Italy) **Sandra Cecchini** / (Argentina) **Mercedes Paz (champions)**
3. n/a
4. (Brazil) Neige Dias / (Brazil) Patricia Medrado (quarterfinals)

== Draw ==
=== Key ===
- Q = Qualifier
- WC = Wild card
- LL = Lucky loser
- Alt = Alternate
- SE = Special exempt
- PR = Protected ranking
- ITF = ITF entry
- JE = Junior exempt
- w/o = Walkover
- r = Retired
- d = Defaulted
- SR = Special ranking

First round

Quarterfinals

Semifinals

Final

1
- (Sweden) **C Lindqvist**
- (Sweden) **M Lindström**
**6**
**6**

- (Switzerland) C Cohen
- (Czechoslovakia) D Krajčovičová
4
3

1
- (Sweden) C Lindqvist
- (Sweden) M Lindström
4
**6**
3

- (Greece) A Kanellopoulou
- (Italy) B Romanò
**6**
2
2

- (Italy) **L Ferrando**
- (Italy) **S La Fratta**
**6**
2
**6**

- (Italy) **L Ferrando**
- (Italy) **S La Fratta**
2
**6**
**6**

- (Italy) **L Ferrando**
- (Italy) **S La Fratta**
**7**
**6**

LL
- (Italy) F Bonsignori
- (Greece) O Tsarbopoulou
2
1

- (Belgium) A Devries
- (Netherlands) N Jagerman
6
3

- (Belgium) **A Devries**
- (Netherlands) **N Jagerman**
**6**
**6**

- (Belgium) **A Devries**
- (Netherlands) **N Jagerman**
**6**
**6**

- (Brazil) L Corsato
- (United States) L Spadea
5
0

- (Sweden) J Jonerup
- (Sweden) M Strandlund
3
3

- (Sweden) **J Jonerup**
- (Sweden) **M Strandlund**
**7**
**6**

- (Italy) Linda Ferrando
- (Italy) Silvia La Fratta
0
2

- (Argentina) **B Fulco**
- (Argentina) **A Villagrán**
**6**
**6**

2
- (Italy) **Sandra Cecchini**
- (Argentina) **Mercedes Paz**
**6**
**6**

- (Italy) L Garrone
- (Italy) L Lapi
2
1

- (Argentina) **B Fulco**
- (Argentina) **A Villagrán**
**6**
**6**

- (Sweden) H Dahlström
- (Sweden) E L Olsson
**6**
2
2

4
- (Brazil) N Dias
- (Brazil) P Medrado
3
2

4
- (Brazil) **N Dias**
- (Brazil) **P Medrado**
3
**6**
**6**

- (Argentina) B Fulco
- (Argentina) A Villagrán
6
3

- (Sweden) M Ekstrand
- (Sweden) M Lundqvist
3
6

2
- (Italy) **S Cecchini**
- (Argentina) **M Paz**
**7**
**6**

- (Finland) **A Aallonen**
- (Sweden) **A-K Olsson**
**6**
**7**

- (Finland) A Aallonen
- (Sweden) A-K Olsson
1
3

- (United States) M Torres
- (Belgium) S Wasserman
0
5

2
- (Italy) **S Cecchini**
- (Argentina) **M Paz**
**6**
**6**

2
- (Italy) **L Meskhi**
- (Soviet Union) **N Zvereva**
**6**
**7**
