= 1990 Geneva Open – Doubles =

Doubles
- 1990 Geneva Open

Final
- Champions: (Argentina) Pablo Albano (Sweden) David Engel
- Runners-up: (Australia) Neil Borwick (New Zealand) David Lewis
- Score: 6–3, 7–6

Details
- Draw: 16
- Seeds: 4

Events
Singles	Doubles
← 1989 ·	Geneva Open	· 1991 →

Andrés Gómez and Alberto Mancini were the defending champions, but did not participate this year.

Pablo Albano and David Engel won the title, defeating Neil Borwick and David Lewis 6–3, 7–6 in the final.

== Seeds ==
1. (Sweden) Jan Gunnarsson / (West Germany) Udo Riglewski (first round)
2. (Argentina) Horacio de la Peña / (Australia) David Macpherson (first round)
3. (Switzerland) Jakob Hlasek / (Switzerland) Marc Rosset (first round)
4. (Czechoslovakia) Vojtěch Flégl / (Czechoslovakia) Marián Vajda (first round)

== Draw ==
=== Key ===
- Q = Qualifier
- WC = Wild card
- LL = Lucky loser
- Alt = Alternate
- SE = Special exempt
- PR = Protected ranking
- ITF = ITF entry
- JE = Junior exempt
- w/o = Walkover
- r = Retired
- d = Defaulted
- SR = Special ranking

=== Draw ===
First round
1	(Sweden) J Gunnarsson (West Germany) U Riglewski	3	6
(Switzerland) C Mezzadri (Socialist Federal Republic of Yugoslavia) G Prpić	6	7
(Italy) O Camporese (Italy) R Furlan	4	1
(West Germany) P Ballauff (West Germany) A Mronz	6	6
3	(Switzerland) J Hlasek (Switzerland) M Rosset	2	2
(Argentina) P Albano (Sweden) D Engel	6	6
(Argentina) D Orsanic (West Germany) Jens Peter	4	6	7
(Argentina) R Argüello (Italy) Massimiliano Botta	6	3	6
(Spain) E Benfele Álvarez (Spain) JA Conde	6	0
(Italy) P Canè (Switzerland) S Mezzadri	7	6
(West Germany) K Braasch (West Germany) H Rittersbacher	7	6	7
4	(Czechoslovakia) V Flégl (Czechoslovakia) M Vajda	5	7	6
(Sweden) L Jonsson (Czechoslovakia) M Střelba	5	0
(Australia) N Borwick (New Zealand) D Lewis	7	6
(Italy) S Colombo (Soviet Union) A Olhovskiy	7	6	6
2	(Argentina) H de la Peña (Australia) D Macpherson	6	7	4

Quarterfinals
(Switzerland) C Mezzadri (Socialist Federal Republic of Yugoslavia) G Prpić	6	6	6
(West Germany) P Ballauff (West Germany) A Mronz	7	3	4
(Argentina) P Albano (Sweden) D Engel	6	6
(Argentina) D Orsanic (West Germany) J Peter	2	4
(Italy) P Canè (Switzerland) S Mezzadri	6	5	7
(West Germany) K Braasch (West Germany) H Rittersbacher	4	7	6
(Australia) N Borwick (New Zealand) D Lewis	7	3	6
(Italy) S Colombo (Soviet Union) A Olhovskiy	6	6	2

Semifinals
(Switzerland) C Mezzadri (Socialist Federal Republic of Yugoslavia) G Prpić	4	5
(Argentina) P Albano (Sweden) D Engel	6	7
(Italy) P Canè (Switzerland) S Mezzadri	6	5	6
(Australia) N Borwick (New Zealand) D Lewis	4	7	7

Final
(Argentina) P Albano (Sweden) D Engel	6	7
(Australia) N Borwick (New Zealand) D Lewis	3	6
