= 1989 Volvo Open – Women's singles =

Women's singles
- 1989 Volvo Open
- 1988 Champion: (West Germany) Isabel Cueto

Final
- Champion: (Bulgaria) Katerina Maleeva
- Runner-up: (West Germany) Sabine Hack
- Score: 6–1, 6–3

Events
Singles	men	women
Doubles	men	women
← 1988 ·	Swedish Open	· 1990 →

Isabel Cueto was the defending champion but lost in the quarterfinals to Maria Strandlund.

Katerina Maleeva won in the final 6–1, 6–3 against Sabine Hack.

== Seeds ==
A champion seed is indicated in bold text while text in italics indicates the round in which that seed was eliminated.

1. (Bulgaria) **Katerina Maleeva (champion)**
2. (Austria) Barbara Paulus (first round)
3. (West Germany) Isabel Cueto (quarterfinals)
4. (Italy) Sandra Cecchini (semifinals)
5. (Czechoslovakia) Radka Zrubáková (quarterfinals)
6. (Belgium) Sandra Wasserman (first round)
7. (Czechoslovakia) Regina Rajchrtová (second round)
8. (Argentina) Mercedes Paz (second round)

== Draw ==
=== Key ===
- Q = Qualifier
- WC = Wild card
- LL = Lucky loser
- Alt = Alternate
- SE = Special exempt
- PR = Protected ranking
- ITF = ITF entry
- JE = Junior exempt
- w/o = Walkover
- r = Retired
- d = Defaulted
- SR = Special ranking

First round
1	(Bulgaria) **K Maleeva**	**6**	**7**
(Socialist Federal Republic of Yugoslavia) S Goleš	1	6
(Czechoslovakia) **L Lásková**	**6**	**6**
(Brazil) A Vieira	0	2
Q	(West Germany) E-M Schürhoff	4	4
(Italy) **C Caverzasio**	**6**	**6**
(Sweden) M Ekstrand	2	3
8	(Argentina) **M Paz**	**6**	**6**
4	(Italy) **S Cecchini**	**7**	5	**6**
(Denmark) T Scheuer-Larsen	5	**7**	4
(Netherlands) **N Jagerman**	4	**7**	**7**
(Italy) L Garrone	**6**	6	5
LL	(France) M Laval	3	3
LL	(Finland) **N Dahlman**	**6**	**6**
Q	(West Germany) **S Menning**	**6**	**6**
6	(Belgium) S Wasserman	3	3
7	(Czechoslovakia) **R Rajchrtová**	2	**6**	**6**
(Switzerland) C Cohen	**6**	2	4
(Italy) L Lapi	5	4
(Sweden) **M Strandlund**	**7**	**6**
(Austria) P Ritter	0	4
(Czechoslovakia) **I Budařová**	**6**	**6**
Q	(France) S Niox-Chateau	4	2
3	(West Germany) **I Cueto**	**6**	**6**
5	(Czechoslovakia) **R Zrubáková**	**6**	**7**
(Soviet Union) N Medvedeva	3	5
(Sweden) M Lindström	2	2
(West Germany) **S Meier**	**6**	**6**
(France) **M-C Damas**	**6**	2	**6**
Q	(Italy) M Grossi	1	**6**	4
(West Germany) **S Hack**	**7**	**6**
2	(Austria) B Paulus	5	3

Second round
1	(Bulgaria) **K Maleeva**	**6**	**6**
(Czechoslovakia) L Lásková	2	3
(Italy) **C Caverzasio**	1	**6**	**6**
8	(Argentina) M Paz	**6**	4	2
4	(Italy) **S Cecchini**	**6**	3	**7**
(Netherlands) N Jagerman	2	**6**	6
LL	(Finland) **N Dahlman**	**6**	**6**
Q	(West Germany) S Menning	2	3
7	(Czechoslovakia) R Rajchrtová	**6**	5	3
(Sweden) **M Strandlund**	3	**7**	**6**
(Czechoslovakia) I Budařová	1	2
3	(West Germany) **I Cueto**	**6**	**6**
5	(Czechoslovakia) **R Zrubáková**	**6**	2	**6**
(West Germany) S Meier	2	**6**	3
(France) M-C Damas	1	1
(West Germany) **S Hack**	**6**	**6**

Quarterfinals
1	(Bulgaria) **K Maleeva**	**6**	3	**6**
(Italy) C Caverzasio	3	**6**	3
4	(Italy) **S Cecchini**	**6**	**6**
LL	(Finland) N Dahlman	4	2
(Sweden) **M Strandlund**	**6**	**6**
3	(West Germany) I Cueto	2	1
5	(Czechoslovakia) R Zrubáková
(West Germany) **S Hack**	**w/o**

Semifinals
1	(Bulgaria) **K Maleeva**	**6**	2	**6**
4	(Italy) S Cecchini	4	**6**	4
(Sweden) M Strandlund	2	3
(West Germany) **S Hack**	**6**	**6**

Final
1	(Bulgaria) **Katerina Maleeva**	**6**	**6**
(West Germany) Sabine Hack	1	3
