= 1988 Swedish Open =

- Date: 4–10 July (women); 11–17 July (men)
- Edition: 41st
- Category: Grand Prix
- Draw: 48S / 24D
- Prize money: $215,000
- Surface: Clay / outdoor
- Location: Båstad, Sweden

Champions

Men's singles
- (Uruguay) Marcelo Filippini

Women's singles
- (West Germany) Isabel Cueto

Men's doubles
- (West Germany) Patrick Baur / (West Germany) Udo Riglewski

Women's doubles
- (Italy) Sandra Cecchini / (Argentina) Mercedes Paz
- Swedish Open

The 1988 Swedish Open, also known as the Volvo (Ladies) Open was a combined men's and women's tennis tournament played on outdoor clay courts held in Båstad, Sweden and was part of the Grand Prix circuit of the 1988 Tour, as well as the Category 1 tier of the 1988 WTA Tour. It was the 41st edition of the tournament and was held from 11 July through 17 July 1988. Marcelo Filippini won the singles title.

== Finals ==
=== Men's singles ===
(Uruguay) Marcelo Filippini defeated (Italy) Francesco Cancellotti 2–6, 6–4, 6–4

=== Women's singles ===
(West Germany) Isabel Cueto defeated (Italy) Sandra Cecchini 7–5, 6–1

- It was Cueto's 1st title of the year and the 2nd of her career.

=== Men's doubles ===
(West Germany) Patrick Baur / (West Germany) Udo Riglewski defeated (Sweden) Stefan Edberg / (Sweden) Niclas Kroon 6–7, 6–3, 7–6

- It was Baur's only title of the year and the 1st of his career. It was Riglewski's only title of the year and the 2nd of his career.

=== Women's doubles ===
(Italy) Sandra Cecchini / (Argentina) Mercedes Paz defeated (Italy) Linda Ferrando / (Italy) Silvia La Fratta 6–0, 6–2

- It was Cecchini's 2nd title of the year and the 9th of her career. It was Paz's 1st title of the year and the 9th of her career.
