= Fredrik Rosenquist =

Swedish tennis player

- Country (sports): Sweden
- Residence: Gränna, Sweden
- Born: 30 April 1965 (age 59); Malmö, Sweden
- Height: 1.80 m (5 ft 11 in)
- Plays: Right-handed
- Prize money: $3,549

Singles
- Career record: 1–3
- Highest ranking: No. 356 (17 November 1986)

Doubles
- Highest ranking: No. 581 (10 June 1985)

Fredrik Rosenquist (born 30 April 1965) is a Swedish former tennis player.

Born in Malmö, Rosenquist's best performance on the Grand Prix tennis tour was in 1986 when he reached the second round of the Swedish Open where he lost to Emilio Sanchez. He also twice competed in the Austrian Open held in Kitzbühel.

Rosenquist has a career high ATP singles ranking of No. 356, achieved on 17 November 1986.
