= 1991 Geneva Open =

- Date: 9–16 September
- Edition: 12th
- Category: World Series
- Draw: 32S / 16D
- Prize money: $225,000
- Surface: Clay / outdoor
- Location: Geneva, Switzerland

Champions

Singles
- (Austria) Thomas Muster

Doubles
- (Spain) Sergi Bruguera / (Switzerland) Marc Rosset
- Geneva Open

The 1991 Geneva Open was a men's tennis tournament played on clay courts that was part of the World Series of the 1991 ATP Tour. It was the 12th edition of the tournament and was played at Geneva, Switzerland from 9 September through 16 September 1991. Unseeded Thomas Muster won the singles title.

== Finals ==
=== Singles ===
(Austria) Thomas Muster defeated (Austria) Horst Skoff 6–2, 6–4

- It was Muster's 2nd title of the year and the 11th of his career.

=== Doubles ===
(Spain) Sergi Bruguera / (Switzerland) Marc Rosset defeated (Sweden) Per Henricsson / (Sweden) Ola Jonsson 3–6, 6–3, 6–2

- It was Bruguera's 3rd title of the year and the 5th of his career. It was Rosset's only title of the year and the 3rd of his career.
