= Joakim Berner =

Finnish tennis player (born 1957)

- Country (sports): Finland
- Born: 21 November 1957 (age 67); Helsinki, Finland
- Height: 178 cm (5 ft 10 in)
- Plays: Right-handed
- Prize money: $11,616

Singles
- Highest ranking: No. 435 (28 Jul 1986)

Grand Slam singles results
- Wimbledon: Q1 (1983)

Doubles
- Career record: 2–12
- Highest ranking: No. 239 (28 Nov 1988)

Grand Slam doubles results
- Wimbledon: Q1 (1983)

Joakim Berner (born 21 November 1957) is a Finnish former professional tennis player.

Berner's family runs the Finnish conglomerate Berner Oy, founded by his great-grandfather. His father Erik, who was CEO of the company, was also involved in tennis and captained the Finland Davis Cup team.

Active on tour in the 1980s, Berner featured in qualifying at Wimbledon and made two doubles finals on the ATP Challenger Tour. He was a doubles quarter-finalist at the 1986 Swedish Open.

Berner, a Davis Cup player in 1980 and 1981, was the team's captain from 2005 to 2007.

== ATP Challenger finals ==
=== Doubles: 2 (0–2) ===
Result	No.	Date	Tournament	Surface	Partner	Opponents	Score
Loss	1.	Jul 1988	Hanko, Finland	Clay	(Sweden) Tomas Nydahl	(Denmark) Morten Christensen (Denmark) Michael Tauson	2–6, 1–6
Loss	2.	Aug 1988	Ostend, Belgium	Clay	(Sweden) Tomas Nydahl	(Sweden) Per Henricsson (Sweden) Nicklas Utgren	1–6, 5–7
