= David Lewis (tennis) =

New Zealand tennis player (born 1964)

- Country (sports): New Zealand
- Residence: Wellington, New Zealand
- Born: 3 September 1964 (age 62) Lower Hutt, New Zealand
- Height: 5 ft 11 in (180 cm)
- Turned pro: 1983
- Plays: Right-handed
- Prize money: $86,158

Singles
- Career record: 8–21
- Career titles: 0
- Highest ranking: No. 152 (14 March 1988)

Doubles
- Career record: 15–35
- Career titles: 0
- Highest ranking: No. 133 (8 April 1991)

Grand Slam doubles results
- Australian Open: 3R (1988)
- French Open: 1R (1988)

Grand Slam mixed doubles results
- Australian Open: 1R (1988)
- French Open: 2R (1988)

Personal details
- Relatives: Chris Lewis (brother); Mark Lewis (brother); Geneva Lewis (niece)

David Lewis (born 3 September 1964) is a former professional tennis player from New Zealand. He is a younger brother of 1983 Wimbledon finalist Chris Lewis and of Mark Lewis. He spent his childhood in Auckland and was educated at St Peter's College.

== Career ==
Lewis and partner Tony Withers won the boys' doubles title in the 1981 Australian Open. He was a singles quarter-finalist in the boys' singles at the 1982 Australian Open and also won the New Zealand National Championships for the 18s age group that year.

Most successful as a doubles player, Lewis was a runner-up in the 1990 Geneva Open with Neil Borwick. He appeared in four Grand Slam tournaments and had his best showing at the 1988 Australian Open, where he and Ivo Werner made the round of 16.

He reached his only singles quarterfinal in 1986, at the Auckland ATP event. The following year, he had a win over the world No. 30, Jonas Svensson, in Wellington.

Lewis took part in seven Davis Cup ties for his country. Of his seven doubles rubbers, six of which were with Kelly Evernden, three were won. He won his only singles rubber against Wu Chang-rung of Taiwan.

Lewis is now coaching director of the South Carolina based Ivan Lendl International Junior Tennis Academy.

== ATP career finals ==
=== Doubles: 1 (0–1) ===
Result	Date	Tournament	Surface	Partner	Opponents	Score
Loss	Sep 1990	Geneva, Switzerland	Clay	(Australia) Neil Borwick	(Argentina) Pablo Albano (Sweden) David Engel	3–6, 6–7

== Challenger titles ==
=== Doubles: 4 ===
No.	Year	Location	Surface	Partner	Opponents	Score
1.	1989	Hong Kong	Hard	(New Zealand) Steve Guy	(Australia) Russell Barlow (Australia) Gavin Pfitzner	6–4, 6–2
2.	1990	Nagoya, Japan	Hard	(Sweden) Johan Carlsson	(Japan) Shuzo Matsuoka (Japan) Shigeru Ota	7–5, 6–2
3.	1990	Turin, Italy	Clay	(Australia) Neil Borwick	(Sweden) Christer Allgårdh (Germany) Martin Sinner	6–2, 3–6, 6–2
4.	1990	Salou, Spain	Clay	(Australia) Neil Borwick	(United States) Jimmy Arias (United States) Steve DeVries	6–3, 5–7, 6–3
