= 1991 Geneva Open – Singles =

Singles
- 1991 Geneva Open

Final
- Champion: (Austria) Thomas Muster
- Runner-up: (Austria) Horst Skoff
- Score: 6–2, 6–4

Details
- Draw: 32
- Seeds: 8

Events
Singles	Doubles
← 1990 ·	Geneva Open	· 2015 →

Horst Skoff was the defending champion, but lost in the final this year.

Thomas Muster won the title, defeating Skoff 6–2, 6–4 in the final.

== Seeds ==
1. (Spain) Sergi Bruguera (quarterfinals)
2. (Soviet Union) Andrei Cherkasov (first round)
3. (Socialist Federal Republic of Yugoslavia) Goran Prpić (second round)
4. (Austria) Horst Skoff (final)
5. (Argentina) Alberto Mancini (second round)
6. (Switzerland) Marc Rosset (first round)
7. (Argentina) Guillermo Pérez Roldán (second round)
8. (Italy) Omar Camporese (first round)

== Draw ==
=== Key ===
- Q = Qualifier
- WC = Wild card
- LL = Lucky loser
- Alt = Alternate
- SE = Special exempt
- PR = Protected ranking
- ITF = ITF entry
- JE = Junior exempt
- w/o = Walkover
- r = Retired
- d = Defaulted
- SR = Special ranking

=== Finals ===
Semifinals
(Austria) Thomas Muster	7^{7}	7^{7}
WC	(Ukraine) Andrei Medvedev	6^{3}	6^{5}
4	(Austria) Horst Skoff	7^{10}	6
(Spain) Jordi Arrese	6^{8}	2

Final
(Austria) Thomas Muster	6	6
4	(Austria) Horst Skoff	2	4

=== Top half ===
First round
1	(Spain) S Bruguera	6	6
(Belgium) B Wuyts	3	2
WC	(Switzerland) C Mezzadri	6	7
WC	(France) T Tulasne	3	5
(Austria) T Muster	6	7
(Czechoslovakia) M Vajda	3	5
(Uruguay) M Filippini	6^{1}	3
7	(Argentina) G Pérez Roldán	7^{7}	6
3	(Socialist Federal Republic of Yugoslavia) G Prpić	4	6	6
(Israel) G Bloom	6	4	4
(Italy) R Furlan	4	5
Q	(Argentina) C Miniussi	6	7
(Sweden) J Gunnarsson	3	3
(Belgium) E Masso	6	6
WC	(Ukraine) A Medvedev	6	6
6	(Switzerland) M Rosset	2	1

Second round
1	(Spain) S Bruguera	7^{8}	1	6
WC	(Switzerland) C Mezzadri	6^{6}	6	1
(Austria) T Muster	4	6	6
7	(Argentina) G Pérez Roldán	6	1	2
3	(Socialist Federal Republic of Yugoslavia) G Prpić	7^{9}	0	5
Q	(Argentina) C Miniussi	6^{7}	6	7
(Belgium) E Masso	7	6^{3}	1
WC	(Ukraine) A Medvedev	5	7^{7}	6

Quarterfinals
1	(Spain) S Bruguera	6	4	4
(Austria) T Muster	4	6	6
Q	(Argentina) C Miniussi	4	7	5
WC	(Ukraine) A Medvedev	6	5	7

Semifinals
(Austria) T Muster	7^{7}	7^{7}
WC	(Ukraine) A Medvedev	6^{3}	6^{5}

=== Bottom half ===
First round
5	(Argentina) A Mancini	6	7^{7}
(Brazil) L Mattar	3	6^{5}
(Argentina) H de la Peña	7^{7}	7^{7}
(Argentina) F Davín	6^{5}	6^{4}
(Germany) P Baur	6	6^{5}	5
Q	(El Salvador) M Merz	3	7^{7}	7
(Spain) G López	2	0
4	(Austria) H Skoff	6	6
8	(Italy) O Camporese	3	4
Q	(Germany) C Arriens	6	6
(Brazil) J Oncins	6	7
Q	(Spain) J Gisbert-Schultze	4	5
(Finland) V Paloheimo	7^{7}	4	6
(Haiti) R Agénor	6^{5}	6	4
(Spain) J Arrese	6	4	6
2	(Soviet Union) A Cherkasov	4	6	1

Second round
5	(Argentina) A Mancini	1	6	4
(Argentina) H de la Peña	6	3	6
Q	(El Salvador) M Merz	2	0
4	(Austria) H Skoff	6	6
Q	(Germany) C Arriens	5	7	5
(Brazil) J Oncins	7	5	7
(Finland) V Paloheimo	2	6	5
(Spain) J Arrese	6	3	7

Quarterfinals
(Argentina) H de la Peña	6^{3}	6	1
4	(Austria) H Skoff	7^{7}	4	6
(Brazil) J Oncins	6	4	5
(Spain) J Arrese	4	6	7

Semifinals
4	(Austria) H Skoff	7^{10}	6
(Spain) J Arrese	6^{8}	2
