= Magnus Nilsson (tennis) =

Swedish tennis player

- Country (sports): Sweden
- Born: 15 May 1970 (age 54); Helsingborg, Sweden
- Plays: Right-handed
- Prize money: $8,815

Singles
- Career record: 1–1
- Highest ranking: No. 249 (18 September 1989)

Doubles
- Career record: 0–1
- Highest ranking: No. 377 (16 July 1990)

Magnus Nilsson (born 15 May 1970) is a Swedish former tennis player.

Nilsson made one appearance in the main draw of an ATP Tour singles event, as a lucky loser, at the 1990 Swedish Open where he won his first round match against José Francisco Altur and lost in the second round to Diego Pérez. He primarily participated on the ATP Challenger Tour and the ITF Satellite circuits. On the Satellite circuit he won the singles and doubles, with Lars-Anders Wahlgren, at the 1989 Austrian Circuit.

Nilsson has a career high ATP singles ranking of No. 249, achieved on 18 September 1989.
