= 1987 Swedish Open – Singles =

Singles
- 1987 Swedish Open

Final
- Champion: (Sweden) Joakim Nyström
- Runner-up: (Sweden) Stefan Edberg
- Score: 4–6, 6–0, 6–3

Details
- Draw: 32
- Seeds: 8

Events
Singles	Doubles
- Swedish Open

The defending champion was Emilio Sánchez who lost in the semifinals. The fifth seed, Joakim Nyström from Sweden won the singles title.

== Seeds ==
A champion seed is indicated in bold text, while text in italics indicates the round in which that seed was eliminated.

1. (Sweden) Mats Wilander (semifinals)
2. (Sweden) Stefan Edberg (final)
3. (Sweden) Kent Carlsson (quarterfinals)
4. (Spain) Emilio Sánchez (semifinals)
5. (Sweden) **Joakim Nyström (champion)**
6. (Sweden) Anders Järryd (quarterfinals)
7. (Sweden) Mikael Pernfors (second round)
8. (Sweden) Ulf Stenlund (first round)

== Draw ==
Key

- Q = Qualifier
- WC = Wild card
- LL = Lucky loser
- Alt = Alternate
- ITF = ITF entry
- PR = Protected ranking
- SR = Special ranking
- SE = Special exempt
- JE = Junior exempt
- JR = Junior Accelerator Programme entrant
- CO = College Accelerator Programme entrant
- NG = Next Gen Accelerator Program entrant
- w/o = Walkover
- r = Retired
- d = Defaulted

First round
1	(Sweden) **M Wilander**	**7**	4	**6**
(Uruguay) D Pérez	5	**6**	3
(Spain) J Sánchez	2	4
(Spain) **F Luna**	**6**	**6**
(Sweden) M Tideman	**6**	3	0
(Sweden) **J Gunnarsson**	3	**6**	**6**
Q	(Sweden) **P Lindgren**	**7**	2	**7**
8	(Sweden) U Stenlund	6	**6**	5
3	(Sweden) **K Carlsson**	**6**	2	**6**
WC	(Sweden) M Gustafsson	3	**6**	3
(Peru) **P Arraya**	**6**	**6**
WC	(Spain) T Carbonell	3	4
Q	(Sweden) D Engel	4	4
(Czechoslovakia) **J Navrátil**	**6**	**6**
(Italy) F Cancellotti	3	2
5	(Sweden) **J Nyström**	**6**	**6**
6	(Sweden) **A Järryd**	**6**	**6**
(West Germany) D Keretić	4	2
(United States) **L Duncan**	**6**	**6**
Q	(Sweden) L Jönsson	4	3
(Argentina) H de la Peña	1	3
(Sweden) **C Bergström**	**6**	**6**
WC	(Sweden) L-A Wahlgren	1	4
4	(Spain) **E Sánchez**	**6**	**6**
7	(Sweden) **M Pernfors**	5	**6**	**6**
(Spain) J Avendaño	**7**	3	3
(United States) M Buckley	3	4
(West Germany) **P Vojtischek**	**6**	**6**
(West Germany) W Popp	**7**	6	3
Q	(Sweden) **T Haldin**	5	**7**	**6**
(Sweden) S Eriksson	3	2
2	(Sweden) **S Edberg**	**6**	**6**

Second round
1	(Sweden) **M Wilander**	**6**	**6**
(Spain) F Luna	2	3
(Sweden) **J Gunnarsson**	**6**	**6**
Q	(Sweden) P Lindgren	1	0
3	(Sweden) **K Carlsson**	6	**6**	**6**
(Peru) P Arraya	**7**	4	0
(Czechoslovakia) J Navrátil	0	1
5	(Sweden) **J Nyström**	**6**	**6**
6	(Sweden) **A Järryd**	**7**	**6**
(United States) L Duncan	5	1
(Sweden) C Bergström	**6**	3	1
4	(Spain) **E Sánchez**	4	**6**	**6**
7	(Sweden) M Pernfors	4	2
(West Germany) **P Vojtischek**	**6**	**6**
Q	(Sweden) T Haldin	2	0
2	(Sweden) **S Edberg**	**6**	**6**

Quarterfinals
1	(Sweden) **M Wilander**	**6**	**7**
(Sweden) J Gunnarsson	4	6
3	(Sweden) K Carlsson	3	**6**	5
5	(Sweden) **J Nyström**	**6**	5	**7**
6	(Sweden) A Järryd	3	2
4	(Spain) **E Sánchez**	**6**	**6**
(West Germany) P Vojtischek	3	4
2	(Sweden) **S Edberg**	**6**	**6**

Semifinals
1	(Sweden) M Wilander	2	2
5	(Sweden) **J Nyström**	**6**	**6**
4	(Spain) E Sánchez	4	0
2	(Sweden) **S Edberg**	**6**	**6**

Final
5	(Sweden) **J Nyström**	4	**6**	**6**
2	(Sweden) S Edberg	**6**	0	3
