= Magnus Zeile =

Swedish tennis player

- Country (sports): Sweden
- Residence: Uppsala, Sweden
- Born: 10 August 1968 (age 57)
- Plays: Right-handed
- Prize money: $18,601

Singles
- Career record: 0–2
- Highest ranking: No. 240 (24 June 1991)

Doubles
- Career record: 0–1
- Highest ranking: No. 330 (12 March 1990)

Magnus Zeile (born 10 August 1968) is a Swedish former tennis player.

As a junior, Zeile reached the semi-final at 1987 Orange Bowl, before losing to Jim Courier.

Zeile made his Grand Prix tennis circuit main draw singles debut, as a lucky loser, at the 1989 Swedish Open where he lost in the first round to David Engel. He primarily participated on the ATP Challenger Tour and the ITF Satellite circuits. On the Challenger Tour he twice reached the semifinals in doubles, first in 1989 with Per Henricsson at the Knokke Challenger and then in 1990 with Fredrik Perman in Nairobi. Zeile has a career high ATP singles ranking of No. 240, achieved on 24 June 1991. Since retiring from tennis, he has been working as a private banker in Uppsala.
