= Fredrik Waern =

Swedish tennis player

- Country (sports): Sweden
- Residence: Stockholm, Sweden
- Born: 5 May 1965 (age 59); Stockholm, Sweden
- Height: 185 cm (6 ft 1 in)
- Plays: Right-handed
- Prize money: $18,123

Singles
- Career record: 0–4
- Highest ranking: No. 188 (23 May 1988)

Doubles
- Career record: 1–5
- Highest ranking: No. 188 (19 August 1987)

Fredrik Waern (born 5 May 1965) is a former professional tennis player from Sweden.

== Tennis career ==
Waern competed professionally during the late 1980s, and primarily participated on the ATP Challenger Tour and the ITF Satellite circuits. His best results on the Challenger Tour were in the doubles where he and Magnus Gustafsson reached the semifinals at the 1987 Tampere Challenger, and during 1988 he reached two semifinals in doubles, first with Conny Falk in Heilbronn and then with Jörgen Windahl in Hanko.

Waern made his ATP main draw singles debut, as a qualifier, at the 1986 Stockholm Open where he lost in the first round to Jonas Svensson. His ATP main draw debut in doubles, was with Magnus Gustafsson at the 1987 Swedish Open, where they lost to Stefan Edberg and Anders Järryd in the second round.

He has a career high ATP singles ranking of 188 achieved on 23 May 1988. He also has a career high ATP doubles ranking of 188 achieved on 10 August 1987.
