= 1987 Swedish Open =

- Date: 27 July – 2 August
- Edition: 40th
- Category: Grand Prix
- Draw: 32S / 16D
- Prize money: $175,000
- Surface: Clay / outdoor
- Location: Båstad, Sweden

Champions

Singles
- (Sweden) Joakim Nyström

Doubles
- (Sweden) Stefan Edberg / (Sweden) Anders Järryd
← 1986 ·	Swedish Open	· 1988 →

The 1987 Swedish Open was a men's tennis tournament played on outdoor clay courts held in Båstad, Sweden and was part of the Grand Prix circuit of the 1987 Tour. It was the 40th edition of the tournament and was held from 27 July through 2 August 1987. Fifth-seeded Joakim Nyström won the singles title.

== Finals ==
=== Singles ===
(Sweden) Joakim Nyström defeated (Sweden) Stefan Edberg 4–6, 6–0, 6–3

=== Doubles ===
(Sweden) Stefan Edberg / (Sweden) Anders Järryd defeated (Spain) Emilio Sánchez / (Spain) Javier Sánchez 7–6, 6–3
