= Neil Borwick =

Australian tennis player (born 1967)

- Country (sports): Australia
- Born: 15 September 1967 (age 59) Redcliffe, Queensland, Australia
- Height: 193 cm (6 ft 4 in)

Singles
- Career record: 25–50
- Career titles: 0
- Highest ranking: No. 104 (18 October 1993)

Doubles
- Career record: 45–68
- Career titles: 1
- Highest ranking: No. 60 (12 October 1992)

Grand Slam doubles results
- Australian Open: QF (1992)
- French Open: 2R (1991)
- Wimbledon: 3R (1992)
- US Open: QF (1992)

Neil Borwick (born 15 September 1967) is a former professional tennis player from Australia. He was born in Redcliffe, Queensland, Australia.

Borwick enjoyed most of his tennis success while playing doubles. During his career, he won one doubles title. In 1992, he achieved his career-high doubles ranking of world No. 60.

== Career finals ==
=== Doubles: 2 (1–1) ===
Result	W/L	Date	Tournament	Surface	Partner	Opponents	Score
Loss	0–1	Sep 1990	Geneva, Switzerland	Clay	(New Zealand) David Lewis	(Argentina) Pablo Albano (Sweden) David Engel	3–6, 6–7
Win	1–1	Jan 1994	Jakarta, Indonesia	Hard	(Sweden) Jonas Björkman	(Mexico) Jorge Lozano (United States) Jim Pugh	6–4, 6–1
