= 1986 Swedish Open =

- Date: 21–27 July
- Edition: 39th
- Category: Grand Prix
- Draw: 32S / 16D
- Prize money: $125,000
- Surface: Clay / outdoor
- Location: Båstad, Sweden

Champions

Singles
- (Spain) Emilio Sánchez

Doubles
- (Spain) Sergio Casal / (Spain) Emilio Sánchez
- Swedish Open

The 1986 Swedish Open was a men's tennis tournament played on outdoor clay courts held in Båstad, Sweden and was part of the Grand Prix circuit of the 1986 Tour. It was the 39th edition of the tournament and was held from 21 July through 27 July 1986. Sixth-seeded Emilio Sánchez won the singles title.

== Finals ==
=== Singles ===
(Spain) Emilio Sánchez defeated (Sweden) Mats Wilander 7–6, 4–6, 6–4

=== Doubles ===
(Spain) Sergio Casal / (Spain) Emilio Sánchez defeated (South Africa) Craig Campbell / (United States) Joey Rive 6–4, 6–2
