= 1990 Swedish Open =

- Date: 9–15 July
- Edition: 43rd
- Category: World Series (M); Tier V (W)
- Draw: 32S / 16D
- Prize money: $225,000 (M) $75,000 (W)
- Surface: Clay / outdoor
- Location: Båstad, Sweden

Champions

Men's singles
- (Australia) Richard Fromberg

Women's singles
- (Italy) Sandra Cecchini

Men's doubles
- (Sweden) Ronnie Båthman / (Sweden) Rikard Bergh

Women's doubles
- (Argentina) Mercedes Paz / (Denmark) Tine Scheuer-Larsen
- Swedish Open

The 1990 Swedish Open was a combined men's and women's tennis tournament played on outdoor clay courts in Båstad, Sweden. It was part of the World Series of the 1990 ATP Tour and of the Tier V category of the 1990 WTA Tour. It was the 43rd edition of the tournament and was held from 9 July until 15 July 1990. Richard Fromberg and Sandra Cecchini won the singles titles.

== Finals ==
=== Men's singles ===
(Australia) Richard Fromberg defeated (Sweden) Magnus Larsson, 6–2, 7–6^{(7–5)}

- It was Fromberg's 2nd singles title of the year and of his career.

=== Women's singles ===
(Italy) Sandra Cecchini defeated (Switzerland) Csilla Bartos, 6–1, 6–2

=== Men's doubles ===
(Sweden) Ronnie Båthman / (Sweden) Rikard Bergh defeated (Sweden) Jan Gunnarsson / (Germany) Udo Riglewski, 6–1, 6–4

=== Women's doubles ===
(Argentina) Mercedes Paz / (Denmark) Tine Scheuer-Larsen defeated (Netherlands) Carin Bakkum / (Netherlands) Nicole Muns-Jagerman 6–3, 6–7^{(10–12)}, 6–2
