= Claudio Pistolesi =

Italian tennis player

- Country (sports): Italy
- Born: 25 August 1967 (age 58) Rome, Italy
- Turned pro: 1985
- Retired: 1996
- Plays: Right-handed (one-handed backhand)
- Prize money: $587,945

Singles
- Career record: 77–111
- Career titles: 1
- Highest ranking: No. 71 (17 August 1987)

Grand Slam singles results
- Australian Open: 2R (1987, 1990)
- French Open: 3R (1989)
- Wimbledon: 1R (1990, 1991, 1992)
- US Open: 2R (1986)

Doubles
- Career record: 16–35
- Career titles: 0
- Highest ranking: No. 213 (17 November 1986)

Coaching career (1997–)
- Monica Seles (1995–1997); Davide Sanguinetti (2002–2008ret.); Ai Sugiyama; Anna Smashnova (2000–2002); Takao Suzuki (1997–2007); Simone Bolelli (2005–2009); Michael Berrer (2009–2011); Robin Söderling (2011); Daniela Hantuchová (2012)

Coaching achievements
- Coachee singles titles total: 3(Sö)-5(Sm)-9(Se)-2(Sa)
- Coachee doubles titles total: 1(Se-Su)
- List of notable tournaments (with champion) 1996 Australian Open (Seles); Du Maurier Open ('95,'96,'97,) (Seles)

Claudio Pistolesi (born 25 August 1967) is a former professional Italian tennis player.

Pistolesi's highest ATP singles ranking is World No. 71, which he reached in August 1987. His career high in doubles was at World No. 213 in November 1986.

In December 2010, he became the coach of Robin Söderling. He has helped Söderling to win a title in the beginning of 2011, Brisbane, Australia. In 2012, he coached Daniela Hantuchová.

He has also been a member of the ATP Player Council as a coach since 2010, having been re-elected in 2012 and 2016.

== Career finals ==
=== Singles (1 win) ===
Result	W/L	Date	Tournament	Surface	Opponent	Score
Win	1–0	Apr 1987	Bari, Italy	Clay	(Italy) Francesco Cancellotti	6–7, 7–5, 6–3
