= Francesco Cancellotti =

Italian tennis player

- Country (sports): Italy
- Residence: Perugia, Italy
- Born: 27 February 1963 (age 63) Perugia, Italy
- Height: 1.83 m (6 ft 0 in)
- Turned pro: 1981
- Retired: 1990
- Plays: Right-handed
- Prize money: $464,876

Singles
- Career record: 114–118
- Career titles: 2
- Highest ranking: No. 21 (15 April 1985)

Grand Slam singles results
- French Open: 4R (1984, 1985)
- Wimbledon: 1R (1988, 1989)

Doubles
- Career record: 26–41
- Career titles: 0
- Highest ranking: No. 160 (10 October 1988)

Francesco Cancellotti (born 27 February 1963) is a former tennis player from Italy.

Cancellotti won two singles titles during his professional career. He reached his career-high ATP singles ranking on 15 April 1985 as world No. 21.

== Career finals ==
=== Singles (2 wins, 5 losses) ===
Result	W/L	Date	Tournament	Surface	Opponent	Score
Loss	0–1	May 1983	Florence, Italy	Clay	(United States) Jimmy Arias	4–6, 3–6
Win	1–1	May 1984	Florence, Italy	Clay	(United States) Jimmy Brown	6–1, 6–4
Win	2–1	Sep 1984	Palermo, Italy	Clay	(Czechoslovakia) Miloslav Mečíř	6–0, 6–3
Loss	2–2	Sep 1984	Bordeaux, France	Clay	(Spain) José Higueras	5–7, 1–6
Loss	2–3	Apr 1987	Bari, Italy	Clay	(Italy) Claudio Pistolesi	7–6, 5–7, 3–6
Loss	2–4	Aug 1987	Saint-Vincent, Italy	Clay	(Chile) Pedro Rebolledo	6–7, 6–4, 3–6
Loss	2–5	Jul 1988	Båstad, Sweden	Clay	(Uruguay) Marcelo Filippini	6–2, 4–6, 4–6

=== Doubles (1 runner-up) ===
Result	W/L	Date	Tournament	Surface	Partner	Opponents	Score
Loss	0–1	Sep 1988	Bari, Italy	Clay	(Italy) Simone Colombo	(Austria) Thomas Muster (Italy) Claudio Panatta	3–6, 1–6
