= Michael Tauson =

Danish tennis player

- Country (sports): Denmark
- Born: 25 June 1966 (age 58); Copenhagen, Denmark
- Height: 1.93 m (6 ft 4 in)
- Plays: Right-handed
- Prize money: $135,455

Singles
- Career record: 27–26
- Career titles: 0; 2 Challenger
- Highest ranking: No. 101 (3 Mar 1990)

Grand Slam singles results
- Australian Open: 1R (1990)
- French Open: 2R (1989)

Other tournaments
- Olympic Games: 1R (1988)

Doubles
- Career record: 9–10
- Career titles: 0; 1 Challenger
- Highest ranking: No. 118 (4 May 1987)

Grand Slam doubles results
- French Open: 1R (1987)

Other doubles tournaments
- Olympic Games: QF (1988)

Michael Tauson (born 25 June 1966 in Copenhagen) is a former tennis player from Denmark, who represented his native country at the 1988 Summer Olympics in Seoul. There he was defeated in the first round by the number five seed from the United States, Brad Gilbert. The right-hander reached his highest singles ATP-ranking on 5 March 1990, when he became the number 101 of the world. Nowadays Michael Tauson is working, among other things, as tennis commentator for the Danish television channels TV2 and TV2 Sport.

== Personal life ==
His niece Clara Tauson is also a professional tennis player.

== Challenger titles ==
=== Singles: (2) ===
No.	Date	Tournament	Surface	Opponent	Score
1.	Feb 1989	Telford, Great Britain	Carpet	(Sweden) Peter Nyborg	6–4, 6–3
2.	Feb 1989	Croydon, Great Britain	Carpet	(United Kingdom) Chris Bailey	6–4, 7–6

=== Doubles: (1) ===
No.	Year	Tournament	Surface	Partner	Opponents	Score
1.	Jul 1988	Hanko, Finland	Clay	(Denmark) Morten Christensen	(Finland) Joakim Berner (Sweden) Tomas Nydahl	6–2, 6–1

== See also ==
- List of Denmark Davis Cup team representatives
