= Udo Riglewski =

German tennis player

- Country (sports): Germany
- Born: 28 July 1966 (age 60) Lauffen am Neckar, West Germany
- Height: 1.83 m (6 ft 0 in)
- Turned pro: 1985
- Retired: 1995
- Plays: Right-handed
- Prize money: $842,211

Singles
- Career record: 43–79
- Career titles: 0
- Highest ranking: No. 82 (9 July 1990)

Grand Slam singles results
- Australian Open: 3R (1990)
- French Open: 1R (1989, 1990, 1991)
- Wimbledon: 2R (1988, 1990)
- US Open: 1R (1988, 1990)

Doubles
- Career record: 168–163
- Career titles: 10
- Highest ranking: No. 6 (25 March 1991)

Grand Slam doubles results
- Australian Open: QF (1991)
- French Open: 3R (1991)
- Wimbledon: 2R (1990, 1994)
- US Open: QF (1991)

Mixed doubles
- Career record: 1–1
- Career titles: 0

Grand Slam mixed doubles results
- Wimbledon: 2R (1994)

Udo Riglewski (born 28 July 1966) is a former professional tennis player from Germany. He enjoyed most of his tennis success while playing doubles. During his career he won 10 doubles titles and finished runner-up an additional 10 times. He achieved a career-high doubles ranking of world No. 6 in 1991.

== Career finals ==
=== Doubles: 20 (10 titles / 10 runner-ups) ===
Legend Grand Slam (0–0) Year-end championships (0–0) ATP Masters Series (0–1) ATP Championship Series (1–1) ATP International Series (9–8)	Finals by surface Hard (3–3) Grass (0–0) Clay (6–3) Carpet (1–4)

Result	W-L	Date	Tournament	Surface	Partner	Opponents	Score
Win	1–0	May 1987	Florence, Italy	Clay	(Germany) Wolfgang Popp	(Italy) Paolo Canè (Italy) Gianni Ocleppo	6–4, 6–3
Win	2–0	Jul 1988	Båstad, Sweden	Clay	(Germany) Patrick Baur	(Sweden) Stefan Edberg (Sweden) Niclas Kroon	6–7, 6–3, 7–6
Win	3–0	Mar 1989	Nancy, France	Hard (i)	(Sweden) Tobias Svantesson	(Portugal) João Cunha e Silva (Belgium) Eduardo Masso	6–4, 6–7, 7–6
Win	4–0	Apr 1989	Nice, France	Clay	(Germany) Ricki Osterthun	(Switzerland) Heinz Günthardt (Hungary) Balázs Taróczy	7–6, 6–7, 6–1
Win	5–0	Oct 1989	Basel, Switzerland	Hard (i)	(Germany) Michael Stich	(Italy) Omar Camporese (Switzerland) Claudio Mezzadri	6–3, 4–6, 6–0
Loss	5–1	Feb 1990	Milan, Italy	Carpet	(Netherlands) Tom Nijssen	(Italy) Omar Camporese (Italy) Diego Nargiso	4–6, 4–6
Loss	5–2	Feb 1990	Memphis, U.S.	Hard (i)	(Germany) Michael Stich	(Australia) Darren Cahill (Australia) Mark Kratzmann	5–7, 2–6
Win	6–2	May 1990	Munich, West Germany	Clay	(Germany) Michael Stich	(Czech Republic) Petr Korda (Czech Republic) Tomáš Šmíd	6–1, 6–4
Loss	6–3	May 1990	Hamburg, West Germany	Clay	(Germany) Michael Stich	(Spain) Sergi Bruguera (United States) Jim Courier	6–7, 2–6
Win	7–3	May 1990	Bologna, Italy	Clay	(Argentina) Gustavo Luza	(France) Jérôme Potier (United States) Jim Pugh	7–6, 4–6, 6–1
Win	8–3	Jun 1990	Genoa, Italy	Clay	(Spain) Tomás Carbonell	(Italy) Cristiano Caratti (Italy) Federico Mordegan	7–6, 7–6
Loss	8–4	Jul 1990	Båstad, Sweden	Clay	(Sweden) Jan Gunnarsson	(Sweden) Rikard Bergh (Sweden) Ronnie Båthman	1–6, 4–6
Loss	8–5	Aug 1990	Long Island, U.S.	Hard	(Germany) Michael Stich	(France) Guy Forget (Switzerland) Jakob Hlasek	6–2, 3–6, 4–6
Win	9–5	Oct 1990	Vienna, Austria	Carpet	(Germany) Michael Stich	(Mexico) Jorge Lozano (United States) Todd Witsken	6–4, 6–4
Loss	9–6	Feb 1991	Philadelphia, U.S.	Carpet	(Germany) Michael Stich	(United States) Rick Leach (United States) Jim Pugh	4–6, 4–6
Win	10–6	Jan 1991	Memphis, U.S.	Hard (i)	(Germany) Michael Stich	(Australia) John Fitzgerald (Australia) Laurie Warder	7–5, 6–3
Loss	10–7	Oct 1992	Vienna, Austria	Carpet	(United States) Kent Kinnear	(Sweden) Ronnie Båthman (Sweden) Anders Järryd	3–6, 5–7
Loss	10–8	Mar 1993	Estoril, Portugal	Clay	(Netherlands) Menno Oosting	(South Africa) David Adams (Russia) Andrei Olhovskiy	3–6, 5–7
Loss	10–9	Oct 1993	Toulouse, France	Hard (i)	(Germany) David Prinosil	(Zimbabwe) Byron Black (United States) Jonathan Stark	5–7, 6–7
Loss	10–10	Mar 1994	Copenhagen, Denmark	Carpet	(Germany) David Prinosil	(Czech Republic) Martin Damm (New Zealand) Brett Steven	3–6, 4–6
