= Niclas Kroon =

Swedish tennis player

- Country (sports): Sweden
- Residence: Monte Carlo, Monaco
- Born: 5 February 1966 (age 59); Karlstad, Sweden
- Height: 1.83 m (6 ft 0 in)
- Turned pro: 1986
- Retired: 1996
- Plays: Right-handed
- Prize money: $448,124

Singles
- Career record: 48–65
- Career titles: 1
- Highest ranking: No. 46 (11 December 1989)

Grand Slam singles results
- Australian Open: 3R (1988, 1989)
- French Open: 4R (1990)
- Wimbledon: 3R (1990)
- US Open: 1R (1988)

Doubles
- Career record: 26–47
- Career titles: 0
- Highest ranking: No. 94 (27 February 1989)

Grand Slam doubles results
- Australian Open: 2R (1988, 1989)
- Wimbledon: 1R (1988, 1989)
- US Open: 1R (1988)

Niclas Kroon (born 5 February 1966) is a former tennis player from Sweden. The right-hander turned pro in 1986 and reached his career-high singles ranking on the ATP Tour of World No. 46 in December 1989. His best performance at a Grand Slam came at the 1990 French Open, where he reached the fourth round.

During his career, Kroon was known for the 'Vicht' salute as a form of celebration. This was later adopted by Lleyton Hewitt, who bought the rights to the trademark after Kroon had mistakenly let it lapse.

== Career finals ==
=== Singles: 1 (1 title) ===
Legend
Grand Slam (0)
Tennis Masters Cup (0)
ATP Masters Series (0)
ATP Tour (1)

Result	W/L	Date	Tournament	Surface	Opponent	Score
Win	1–0	Oct 1989	Brisbane, Australia	Hard	(Australia) Mark Woodforde	4–6, 6–2, 6–4

=== Doubles: 1 (1 runner-up) ===
Result	W/L	Date	Tournament	Surface	Partner	Opponents	Score
Loss	0–1	Jul 1988	Båstad, Sweden	Clay	(Sweden) Stefan Edberg	(West Germany) Patrick Baur (West Germany) Udo Riglewski	7–6, 3–6, 6–7
