= David Engel (tennis) =

Swedish tennis player

- Country (sports): Sweden
- Residence: Dinslaken, Germany
- Born: 17 October 1967 (age 58) Gothenburg, Sweden
- Height: 1.80 m (5 ft 11 in)
- Turned pro: 1986
- Plays: Right-handed
- Prize money: $363,721

Singles
- Career record: 24–48
- Career titles: 0
- Highest ranking: No. 114 (5 Nov 1990)

Grand Slam singles results
- Australian Open: 2R (1991)
- French Open: 1R (1988, 1990)
- US Open: 2R (1990)

Doubles
- Career record: 23–42
- Career titles: 1
- Highest ranking: No. 107 (15 Jul 1991)

Grand Slam doubles results
- Australian Open: 1R (1990, 1991, 1992)
- French Open: 2R (1991)
- Wimbledon: 1R (1990)
- US Open: 1R (1991)

David Engel (born 17 October 1967) is a former professional tennis player from Sweden.

== Career ==
Engel participated in the singles draw of five Grand Slams and twice progressed to the second round. He defeated Marcio Rincon in the opening round of the 1990 US Open, before losing to John McEnroe and also had a win in his next Grand Slam event, the 1991 Australian Open, where he beat Kelly Evernden in four sets. His best showing in a singles tournament during his time on the ATP Tour came at the 1990 Continental Championships in the Netherlands. He reached the quarter-finals and en route defeated world number 38 Paul Haarhuis.

He was more successful on the doubles circuit, with the highlight of his career being his win in the 1990 Geneva Open, with Pablo Albano. Previously, Engel had been a doubles semi-finalist at Tel Aviv in 1987, Båstad in 1989 and Basel in 1989. He made the second round of the 1991 French Open, partnering Ola Jonsson, but it would be his only win in a Grand Slam doubles match.

== ATP career finals ==
=== Doubles: 1 (1–0) ===
| Result | W-L | Date | Tournament | Surface | Partner | Opponents | Score |
|---|---|---|---|---|---|---|---|
| Win | 1–0 | Sep 1990 | Geneva, Switzerland | Clay | (Argentina) Pablo Albano | (New Zealand) David Lewis (Australia) Neil Borwick | 6–3, 7–6 |

== Challenger titles ==
=== Singles: (2) ===
| No. | Year | Tournament | Surface | Opponent | Score |
|---|---|---|---|---|---|
| 1. | 1989 | Helsinki, Finland | Carpet | (Finland) Veli Paloheimo | 4–6, 7–6, 6–1 |
| 2. | 1993 | Hong Kong | Hard | (Mexico) Oliver Fernandez | 6–1, 1–0 ret |

=== Doubles: (5) ===
| No. | Year | Tournament | Surface | Partner | Opponents | Score |
|---|---|---|---|---|---|---|
| 1. | 1987 | Tampere, Finland | Clay | (Australia) Des Tyson | (Sweden) Christer Allgårdh (Greece) George Kalovelonis | 6–3, 3–6, 6–3 |
| 2. | 1989 | Pescara, Italy | Clay | (Sweden) Fredrik Nilsson | (Sweden) Nicklas Kulti (Sweden) Magnus Larsson | 6–2, 4–6, 7–6 |
| 3. | 1991 | Salzburg, Austria | Clay | (Sweden) Johan Carlsson | (New Zealand) Bruce Derlin (Germany) Martin Sinner | 7–6, 6–2 |
| 4. | 1993 | Tampere, Finland | Clay | (Sweden) Nicklas Utgren | (Croatia) Saša Hiršzon (Norway) Christian Ruud | 6–4, 7–5 |
| 5. | 1994 | Aachen, Germany | Carpet | (Sweden) Ola Kristiansson | (Australia) Wayne Arthurs (Australia) Brent Larkham | 6–4, 6–4 |
