= 1989 Torneo Internazionale Città di Firenze – Doubles =

Doubles
- 1989 Torneo Internazionale Città di Firenze

Final
- Champions: (United States) Mike De Palmer (United States) Blaine Willenborg
- Runners-up: (Italy) Pietro Pennisi (Italy) Simone Restelli
- Score: 4–6, 6–4, 6–4

Details
- Draw: 16
- Seeds: 4

Events
Singles	Doubles
← 1988 ·	ATP Florence	· 1990 →

Javier Frana and Christian Miniussi were the defending champions, but Frana did not compete this year. Miniussi teamed up with Nicolás Pereira and lost in the quarterfinals to Goran Ivanišević and Diego Nargiso.

Mike De Palmer and Blaine Willenborg won the title to Pietro Pennisi and Simone Restelli 4–6, 6–4, 6–4 in the final.

== Seeds ==
1. (Socialist Federal Republic of Yugoslavia) Goran Ivanišević / (Italy) Diego Nargiso (semifinals)
2. (United States) John Letts / (United States) Tim Pawsat (first round)
3. (Italy) Omar Camporese / (Italy) Claudio Panatta (first round)
4. (United States) Mike De Palmer / (United States) Blaine Willenborg (champion)

== Draw ==
=== Key ===
- Q = Qualifier
- WC = Wild card
- LL = Lucky loser
- Alt = Alternate
- SE = Special exempt
- PR = Protected ranking
- ITF = ITF entry
- JE = Junior exempt
- w/o = Walkover
- r = Retired
- d = Defaulted
- SR = Special ranking

=== Draw ===
First round
1	(Socialist Federal Republic of Yugoslavia) G Ivanišević (Italy) D Nargiso	6	6
(Switzerland) S Mezzadri (Italy) U Pigato	3	4
(Argentina) E Bengoechea (Argentina) H de la Peña	4	4
(Argentina) C Miniussi (Venezuela) N Pereira	6	6
4	(United States) M De Palmer (United States) B Willenborg	6	6
(Argentina) JL Clerc (United States) D Rostagno	2	2
(Italy) M Cierro (Italy) M Narducci	6	6
(United States) L Duncan (France) T Tulasne	3	4
(Spain) F Clavet (Ecuador) R Viver	5	2
(Finland) V Paloheimo (Finland) O Rahnasto	7	6
(Italy) P Pennisi (Italy) Simone Restelli	7	6
3	(Italy) O Camporese (Italy) C Panatta	5	2
(Italy) C Aprili (United States) J Arias	3	2
(Romania) M Năstase (Spain) B Uribe	6	6
(Socialist Federal Republic of Yugoslavia) I Flego (Venezuela) A Mora	6	7
2	(United States) J Letts (United States) T Pawsat	1	6

Quarterfinals
1	(Socialist Federal Republic of Yugoslavia) G Ivanišević (Italy) D Nargiso	6	6	6
(Argentina) C Miniussi (Venezuela) N Pereira	4	7	3
4	(United States) M De Palmer (United States) B Willenborg	7	4	6
(Italy) M Cierro (Italy) M Narducci	6	6	4
(Finland) V Paloheimo (Finland) O Rahnasto	6	6	3
(Italy) P Pennisi (Italy) S Restelli	7	4	6
(Romania) M Năstase (Spain) B Uribe	7	7
(Socialist Federal Republic of Yugoslavia) I Flego (Venezuela) A Mora	5	6

Semifinals
1	(Socialist Federal Republic of Yugoslavia) G Ivanišević (Italy) D Nargiso	4	5
4	(United States) M De Palmer (United States) B Willenborg	6	7
(Italy) P Pennisi (Italy) S Restelli	6	5	7
(Romania) M Năstase (Spain) B Uribe	4	7	6

Final
4	(United States) M De Palmer (United States) B Willenborg	4	6	6
(Italy) P Pennisi (Italy) S Restelli	6	4	4
