= 1988 Torneo Internazionale Città di Firenze – Doubles =

Doubles
- 1988 Torneo Internazionale Città di Firenze

Final
- Champions: (Argentina) Javier Frana (Argentina) Christian Miniussi
- Runners-up: (Italy) Claudio Pistolesi (Austria) Horst Skoff
- Score: 7–6, 6–4

Details
- Draw: 16 (1WC)
- Seeds: 4

Events
Singles	Doubles
- ATP Florence

Wolfgang Popp and Udo Riglewski were the defending champions, but none competed this year.

Javier Frana and Christian Miniussi won the title by defeating Claudio Pistolesi and Horst Skoff 7–6, 6–4 in the final.

== Seeds ==
1. (Argentina) Javier Frana / (Argentina) Christian Miniussi (champions)
2. (United States) David Dowlen / (United States) Marcel Freeman (semifinals)
3. (Italy) Omar Camporese / (Italy) Paolo Canè (first round)
4. (Australia) David Macpherson / (United States) Tim Siegel (semifinals)

== Draw ==
Key

- Q = Qualifier
- WC = Wild card
- LL = Lucky loser
- Alt = Alternate
- ITF = ITF entry
- PR = Protected ranking
- SR = Special ranking
- SE = Special exempt
- JE = Junior exempt
- JR = Junior Accelerator Programme entrant
- CO = College Accelerator Programme entrant
- NG = Next Gen Accelerator Program entrant
- w/o = Walkover
- r = Retired
- d = Defaulted

=== Draw ===
First round
1	(Argentina) J Frana (Argentina) C Miniussi	6	6
(Spain) A Tous (Spain) Fernando Tous	1	2
(Peru) P Arraya (Argentina) A Mancini	4	3
(Germany) P Baur (Italy) C Panatta	6	6
4	(Australia) D Macpherson (United States) T Siegel	4	6	1
WC	(Italy) F Fanucci (Italy) T Zugarelli	6	2	1^{r}
(United States) B Cox (New Zealand) D Lewis	6	6
(Italy) P Pennisi (Italy) Simone Restelli	4	0
(United States) J Brown (United States) L Duncan	1	1
(Italy) C Pistolesi (Austria) H Skoff	6	6
(Italy) F Cancellotti (Senegal) Y Doumbia	6	6
3	(Italy) O Camporese (Italy) P Canè	4	4
(Argentina) F Davín (Chile) P Rebolledo	5	3
(Italy) A Baldoni (Italy) M Narducci	7	6
(Israel) G Bloom (Peru) J Yzaga	6	2
2	(United States) D Dowlen (United States) M Freeman	7	6

Quarterfinals
1	(Argentina) J Frana (Argentina) C Miniussi	6	6
(Germany) P Baur (Italy) C Panatta	4	2
4	(Australia) D Macpherson (United States) T Siegel	6	6	6
(United States) B Cox (New Zealand) D Lewis	7	4	4
(Italy) C Pistolesi (Austria) H Skoff	6	7	4
(Italy) F Cancellotti (Senegal) Y Doumbia	7	6	1^{r}
(Italy) A Baldoni (Italy) M Narducci	1	2
2	(United States) D Dowlen (United States) M Freeman	6	6

Semifinals
1	(Argentina) J Frana (Argentina) C Miniussi	6	6
4	(Australia) D Macpherson (United States) T Siegel	4	1
(Italy) C Pistolesi (Austria) H Skoff	7	6
2	(United States) D Dowlen (United States) M Freeman	6	3

Final
1	(Argentina) J Frana (Argentina) C Miniussi	7	6
(Italy) C Pistolesi (Austria) H Skoff	6	4
