= 1989 Torneo Internazionale Città di Firenze – Singles =

Singles
- 1989 Torneo Internazionale Città di Firenze

Final
- Champion: (Argentina) Horacio de la Peña
- Runner-up: (Socialist Federal Republic of Yugoslavia) Goran Ivanišević
- Score: 6–4, 6–3

Details
- Draw: 32 (3WC/4Q)
- Seeds: 8

Events
Singles	Doubles
← 1988 ·	ATP Florence	· 1990 →

Massimiliano Narducci was the defending champion, but lost in the first round to Eduardo Bengoechea.

Qualifier and sixth-seeded Horacio de la Peña won the title by defeating Goran Ivanišević 6–4, 6–3 in the final.

== Seeds ==
1. (Ecuador) Andrés Gómez (semifinals)
2. (Uruguay) Marcelo Filippini (first round)
3. (Brazil) Luiz Mattar (quarterfinals)
4. (Argentina) Eduardo Bengoechea (quarterfinals)
5. (Socialist Federal Republic of Yugoslavia) Goran Ivanišević (final)
6. (Argentina) Horacio de la Peña (champion)
7. (United States) Lawson Duncan (semifinals)
8. (Spain) Fernando Luna (second round)

== Draw ==
=== Key ===
- Q = Qualifier
- WC = Wild card
- LL = Lucky loser
- Alt = Alternate
- SE = Special exempt
- PR = Protected ranking
- ITF = ITF entry
- JE = Junior exempt
- w/o = Walkover
- r = Retired
- d = Defaulted
- SR = Special ranking

=== Finals ===
Semifinals
1/WC	(Ecuador) Andrés Gómez	1	1
6/Q	(Argentina) Horacio de la Peña	6	6
5	(Socialist Federal Republic of Yugoslavia) Goran Ivanišević	6	6
7	(United States) Lawson Duncan	3	4

Final
6/Q	(Argentina) Horacio de la Peña	6	6
5	(Socialist Federal Republic of Yugoslavia) Goran Ivanišević	4	3

=== Top half ===
First round
1/WC	(Ecuador) A Gómez	6	7
(West Germany) T Meinecke	2	5
(Italy) F Cancellotti	6	6
Q	(Italy) C Caratti	4	4
WC	(Argentina) JL Clerc	2	6	3
(Italy) O Camporese	6	3	6
(Ecuador) R Viver	0	4
8	(Spain) F Luna	6	6
4	(Argentina) E Bengoechea	4	6	6
WC	(Italy) M Narducci	6	3	4
Q	(Spain) F Clavet	6	6
(Italy) M Cierro	3	2
(Argentina) C Miniussi	6	7	2
(Argentina) R Azar	7	5	6
(Socialist Federal Republic of Yugoslavia) G Prpić	3	2
6/Q	(Argentina) H de la Peña	6	6

Second round
1/WC	(Ecuador) A Gómez	7	7
(Italy) F Cancellotti	5	6
(Italy) O Camporese	6	6
8	(Spain) F Luna	4	3
4	(Argentina) E Bengoechea	6	3	6
Q	(Spain) F Clavet	2	6	3
(Argentina) R Azar	1	6
6/Q	(Argentina) H de la Peña	6	7

Quarterfinals
1/WC	(Ecuador) A Gómez	6	5	6
(Italy) O Camporese	3	7	1
4	(Argentina) E Bengoechea	3	1
6/Q	(Argentina) H de la Peña	6	6

Semifinals
1/WC	(Ecuador) A Gómez	1	1
6/Q	(Argentina) H de la Peña	6	6

=== Bottom half ===
First round
5	(Socialist Federal Republic of Yugoslavia) G Ivanišević	6	6
(Chile) P Rebolledo	3	3
(Italy) C Pistolesi	2	4
Q	(United States) J Arias	6	6
(Finland) V Paloheimo	6	6
(West Germany) M Rackl	3	0
(Venezuela) N Pereira	4	6	5
3	(Brazil) L Mattar	6	3	7
7	(United States) L Duncan	7	6
(Italy) C Panatta	5	4
(Argentina) G Giussani	4	1
(Sweden) N Kroon	6	6
(Portugal) N Marques	6	6
(Australia) J Stoltenberg	4	4
(France) T Tulasne	4	6	6
2	(Uruguay) M Filippini	6	2	0

Second round
5	(Socialist Federal Republic of Yugoslavia) G Ivanišević	6	3	6
Q	(United States) J Arias	2	6	2
(Finland) V Paloheimo	7	4	3
3	(Brazil) L Mattar	5	6	6
7	(United States) L Duncan	6	6
(Sweden) N Kroon	4	2
(Portugal) N Marques	3	2
(France) T Tulasne	6	6

Quarterfinals
5	(Socialist Federal Republic of Yugoslavia) G Ivanišević	7	6
3	(Brazil) L Mattar	6	1
7	(United States) L Duncan	4	7	6
(France) T Tulasne	6	5	1

Semifinals
5	(Socialist Federal Republic of Yugoslavia) G Ivanišević	6	6
7	(United States) L Duncan	3	4
