= 1991 Manchester Open =

- Date: 17–24 June
- Edition: 2nd
- Category: ATP World Series
- Draw: 32S / 16D
- Prize money: $225,000
- Surface: Grass / outdoor
- Location: Manchester, United Kingdom
- Venue: Northern Lawn Tennis Club

Champions

Singles
- (Croatia) Goran Ivanišević

Doubles
- (Italy) Omar Camporese / (Croatia) Goran Ivanišević
← 1990 ·	Manchester Open	· 1992 →

The 1991 Manchester Open was the second edition of the Manchester Open men's tennis tournament and was played outdoor grass court at the Northern Lawn Tennis Club in Manchester, United Kingdom. The tournament was part of the ATP World Series of the 1991 ATP Tour and was held from 17 June until 24 June 1991. Second-seeded Goran Ivanišević won the singles title.

== Finals ==
=== Singles ===
(Croatia) Goran Ivanišević defeated (United States) Pete Sampras 6–4, 6–4

- It was Ivanišević' only singles title of the year and the 2nd of his career.

=== Doubles ===
(Italy) Omar Camporese / (Croatia) Goran Ivanišević defeated (United Kingdom) Nick Brown / (United Kingdom) Andrew Castle 6–4, 6–3
