= 1988 Torneo Internazionale Città di Firenze – Singles =

Singles
- 1988 Torneo Internazionale Città di Firenze

Final
- Champion: (Italy) Massimiliano Narducci
- Runner-up: (Italy) Claudio Panatta
- Score: 3–6, 6–1, 6–4

Details
- Draw: 32 (4WC/2Q/1LL)
- Seeds: 8

Events
| Singles | Doubles |
- ATP Florence

Andrei Chesnokov was the defending champion, but did not compete this year.

Massimiliano Narducci won the title by defeating Claudio Panatta 3–6, 6–1, 6–4 in the final.

== Seeds ==
1. (Argentina) Alberto Mancini (quarterfinals)
2. (Peru) Jaime Yzaga (quarterfinals)
3. (Chile) Pedro Rebolledo (quarterfinals)
4. (Italy) Paolo Canè (first round)
5. (Spain) Alberto Tous (second round)
6. (Argentina) Javier Frana (quarterfinals)
7. (Argentina) Franco Davín (first round)
8. (United States) Lawson Duncan (semifinals)

== Draw ==
Key

- Q = Qualifier
- WC = Wild card
- LL = Lucky loser
- Alt = Alternate
- ITF = ITF entry
- PR = Protected ranking
- SR = Special ranking
- SE = Special exempt
- JE = Junior exempt
- JR = Junior Accelerator Programme entrant
- CO = College Accelerator Programme entrant
- NG = Next Gen Accelerator Program entrant
- w/o = Walkover
- r = Retired
- d = Defaulted

=== Finals ===
Semifinals
8 | (United States) Lawson Duncan | 6 | 2
WC | (Italy) Claudio Panatta | 7 | 6
(Peru) Pablo Arraya | 4 | 1
(Italy) Massimiliano Narducci | 6 | 6

Final
WC | (Italy) Claudio Panatta | 6 | 1 | 4
(Italy) Massimiliano Narducci | 3 | 6 | 6

=== Top half ===
First round
1 | (Argentina) A Mancini | 6 | 3 | 6
(West Germany) U Riglewski | 4 | 6 | 3
(Argentina) C Miniussi | 6 | 4 | 6
(New Zealand) D Lewis | 3 | 6 | 3
(Italy) C Pistolesi | 6 | 7
(United States) J Brown | 4 | 5
(Peru) C di Laura | 5 | 5
8 | (United States) L Duncan | 7 | 7
3 | (Chile) P Rebolledo | 6 | 3 | 6
(Israel) G Bloom | 2 | 6 | 4
Q | (Italy) Antonio Padovani | 3 | 3
(Senegal) Y Doumbia | 6 | 6
(Sweden) P Lindgren | 4 | 1
WC | (Italy) C Panatta | 6 | 6
Q | (Italy) Ugo Biagianti | 1 | 7 | 0
5 | (Spain) A Tous | 6 | 6 | 6

Second round
1 | (Argentina) A Mancini | 6 | 3 | 6
(Argentina) C Miniussi | 2 | 6 | 2
(Italy) C Pistolesi | 4 | 2
8 | (United States) L Duncan | 6 | 6
3 | (Chile) P Rebolledo | 2 | 6 | 6
(Senegal) Y Doumbia | 6 | 1 | 3
WC | (Italy) C Panatta | 6 | 6
5 | (Spain) A Tous | 4 | 4

Quarterfinals
1 | (Argentina) A Mancini | 2 | 7 | 5
8 | (United States) L Duncan | 6 | 5 | 7
3 | (Chile) P Rebolledo | 1 | 6
WC | (Italy) C Panatta | 6 | 7

Semifinals
8 | (United States) L Duncan | 6 | 2
WC | (Italy) C Panatta | 7 | 6

=== Bottom half ===
First round
6 | (Argentina) J Frana | 7 | 6
WC | (Italy) O Camporese | 5 | 1
Q | (Italy) C Aprili | 6 | 6 | 0^{r}
LL | (Spain) F Roig | 1 | 7 | 2
(Spain) J Aguilera | 1 | 2
(Peru) P Arraya | 6 | 6
(Uruguay) D Pérez | 7 | 6 | 6
4 | (Italy) P Canè | 5 | 7 | 3
7 | (Argentina) F Davín | 3 | 1
(Germany) P Baur | 6 | 6
(Uruguay) M Filippini | 2 | 6
(Italy) M Narducci | 6 | 7
(Italy) F Cancellotti | 6 | 6
Q | (Netherlands) P Dogger | 3 | 2
(Austria) H Skoff | 5 | 2
2 | (Peru) J Yzaga | 7 | 6

Second round
6 | (Argentina) J Frana | 6 | 5 | 7
LL | (Spain) F Roig | 3 | 7 | 6
(Peru) P Arraya | 6 | 7
(Uruguay) D Pérez | 3 | 6
(Germany) P Baur | 4 | 1
(Italy) M Narducci | 6 | 6
(Italy) F Cancellotti | 6 | 3 | 4
2 | (Peru) J Yzaga | 2 | 6 | 6

Quarterfinals
6 | (Argentina) J Frana | 4 | 6 | 6
(Peru) P Arraya | 6 | 1 | 7
(Italy) M Narducci | 6 | 3 | 6
2 | (Peru) J Yzaga | 2 | 6 | 3

Semifinals
(Peru) P Arraya | 4 | 1
(Italy) M Narducci | 6 | 6
