= 1991 Manchester Open – Doubles =

Doubles
- 1991 Manchester Open

Final
- Champions: (Italy) Omar Camporese (Croatia) Goran Ivanišević
- Runners-up: (United Kingdom) Nick Brown (United Kingdom) Andrew Castle
- Score: 6–4, 6–3

Details
- Draw: 16
- Seeds: 4

Events
Singles	Doubles
← 1990 ·	Manchester Open	· 1992 →

Mark Kratzmann and Jason Stoltenberg were the defending champions, but did not participate this year.

Omar Camporese and Goran Ivanišević won the title, defeating Nick Brown and Andrew Castle 6–4, 6–3 in the final.

== Seeds ==
1. (South Africa) Gary Muller / (United States) Jim Pugh (first round)
2. (United Kingdom) Jeremy Bates / (Australia) Laurie Warder (semifinals)
3. (United States) Kelly Jones / (Mexico) Jorge Lozano (first round)
4. (Italy) Omar Camporese / (Croatia) Goran Ivanišević (champions)

== Draw ==
=== Key ===
- Q = Qualifier
- WC = Wild card
- LL = Lucky loser
- Alt = Alternate
- SE = Special exempt
- PR = Protected ranking
- ITF = ITF entry
- JE = Junior exempt
- w/o = Walkover
- r = Retired
- d = Defaulted
- SR = Special ranking

=== Draw ===
First round
1	(South Africa) G Muller (United States) J Pugh	6	6
(Netherlands) HJ Davids (Netherlands) P Haarhuis	7	7
Q	(Israel) G Bloom (Israel) A Mansdorf	6	7
(United States) J Brown (United States) B Garnett	4	5
3	(United States) K Jones (Mexico) J Lozano	4	6	6
(United States) J Grabb (Australia) W Masur	6	1	7
WC	(United Kingdom) N Brown (United Kingdom) A Castle	6	3	7
(New Zealand) K Evernden (Sweden) P Lundgren	4	6	6
(Australia) D Macpherson (United States) B Pearce	7	6	6
(Sweden) R Båthman (Sweden) R Bergh	5	7	4
(Netherlands) J Siemerink (United States) T Witsken	7	6	5
4	(Italy) O Camporese (Croatia) G Ivanišević	6	7	7
(Brazil) L Mattar (Brazil) J Oncins	6	6
(United States) S Davis (United States) R Van't Hof	3	4
(South Africa) S Kruger (South Africa) P Norval	3	3
2	(United Kingdom) J Bates (Australia) L Warder	6	6

Quarterfinals
(Netherlands) HJ Davids (Netherlands) P Haarhuis	7	6
Q	(Israel) G Bloom (Israel) A Mansdorf	6	2
(United States) J Grabb (Australia) W Masur	3	6
WC	(United Kingdom) N Brown (United Kingdom) A Castle	6	7
(Australia) D Macpherson (United States) B Pearce	6	3	4
4	(Italy) O Camporese (Croatia) G Ivanišević	3	6	6
(Brazil) L Mattar (Brazil) J Oncins	6	2
2	(United Kingdom) J Bates (Australia) L Warder	7	6

Semifinals
(Netherlands) HJ Davids (Netherlands) P Haarhuis	6	4	6
WC	(United Kingdom) N Brown (United Kingdom) A Castle	2	6	7
4	(Italy) O Camporese (Croatia) G Ivanišević	7	6	6
2	(United Kingdom) J Bates (Australia) L Warder	6	7	4

Final
WC	(United Kingdom) N Brown (United Kingdom) A Castle	4	3
4	(Italy) O Camporese (Croatia) G Ivanišević	6	6
