= 1990 Torneo Internazionale Città di Firenze – Doubles =

Doubles
- 1990 Torneo Internazionale Città di Firenze

Final
- Champions: (Spain) Sergi Bruguera (Argentina) Horacio de la Peña
- Runners-up: (Brazil) Luiz Mattar (Uruguay) Diego Pérez
- Score: 3–6, 6–3, 6–4

Details
- Draw: 16 (1Q)
- Seeds: 4

Events
Singles	Doubles
← 1989 ·	ATP Florence	· 1991 →

Mike De Palmer and Blaine Willenborg were the defending champions, but none competed this year.

Sergi Bruguera and Horacio de la Peña won the title by defeating Luiz Mattar and Diego Pérez 3–6, 6–3, 6–4 in the final.

== Seeds ==
1. (Argentina) Gustavo Luza / (West Germany) Udo Riglewski (quarterfinals)
2. (Netherlands) Mark Koevermans / (Spain) Javier Sánchez (quarterfinals)
3. (Italy) Omar Camporese / (Argentina) Guillermo Pérez Roldán (quarterfinals, retired)
4. (Spain) Juan Carlos Báguena / (Peru) Carlos di Laura (quarterfinals)

== Draw ==
=== Key ===
- Q = Qualifier
- WC = Wild card
- LL = Lucky loser
- Alt = Alternate
- SE = Special exempt
- PR = Protected ranking
- ITF = ITF entry
- JE = Junior exempt
- w/o = Walkover
- r = Retired
- d = Defaulted
- SR = Special ranking

=== Draw ===
First round
1	(Argentina) G Luza (West Germany) U Riglewski	6	6
(Argentina) E Bengoechea (Romania) F Segărceanu	3	1
(Sweden) F Nilsson (Sweden) T Svantesson	4	7	6
(Italy) S Colombo (Austria) H Skoff	6	6	4
4	(Spain) JC Báguena (Peru) C di Laura	6	6
(Spain) F Clavet (Canada) A Sznajder	4	2
(Spain) S Bruguera (Argentina) H de la Peña	6	5	6
(Spain) JF Altur (France) C Pioline	2	7	2
(Brazil) L Mattar (Uruguay) D Pérez	6	6
(Spain) J Clavet (Spain) M Górriz	4	3
(Haiti) R Agénor (Argentina) F Davín	3	4
3	(Italy) O Camporese (Argentina) G Pérez Roldán	6	6
Q	(Sweden) N Kulti (Sweden) M Larsson	6	6
(Italy) M Cierro (Italy) A de Minicis	1	4
(Brazil) R Acioly (Brazil) C Motta	2	6
2	(Netherlands) M Koevermans (Spain) J Sánchez	6	7

Quarterfinals
1	(Argentina) G Luza (West Germany) U Riglewski	4	4
(Sweden) F Nilsson (Sweden) T Svantesson	6	6
4	(Spain) JC Báguena (Peru) C di Laura	5	3
(Spain) S Bruguera (Argentina) H de la Peña	7	6
(Brazil) L Mattar (Uruguay) D Pérez	6
3	(Italy) O Camporese (Argentina) G Pérez Roldán	3	r
Q	(Sweden) N Kulti (Sweden) M Larsson	6	6
2	(Netherlands) M Koevermans (Spain) J Sánchez	2	4

Semifinals
(Sweden) F Nilsson (Sweden) T Svantesson	5	5
(Spain) S Bruguera (Argentina) H de la Peña	7	7
(Brazil) L Mattar (Uruguay) D Pérez	7	6
Q	(Sweden) N Kulti (Sweden) M Larsson	6	4

Final
(Spain) S Bruguera (Argentina) H de la Peña	3	6	6
(Brazil) L Mattar (Uruguay) D Pérez	6	3	4
