= 1990 Manchester Open – Doubles =

Doubles
- 1990 Manchester Open

Final
- Champions: (Australia) Mark Kratzmann (Australia) Jason Stoltenberg
- Runners-up: (United Kingdom) Nick Brown (United States) Kelly Jones
- Score: 6–3, 2–6, 6–4

Details
- Draw: 16
- Seeds: 4

Events
Singles	Doubles
Manchester Open	· 1991 →

This was the first edition of the event.

Mark Kratzmann and Jason Stoltenberg won the title, defeating Nick Brown and Kelly Jones 6–3, 2–6, 6–4 in the final.

== Seeds ==
1. (United States) Patrick Galbraith / (United States) Jim Pugh (semifinals)
2. (Australia) Mark Kratzmann / (Australia) Jason Stoltenberg (champions)
3. (United States) Tim Pawsat / (Australia) Laurie Warder (quarterfinals)
4. (United States) Paul Annacone / (South Africa) Gary Muller (quarterfinals)

== Draw ==
=== Key ===
- Q = Qualifier
- WC = Wild card
- LL = Lucky loser
- Alt = Alternate
- SE = Special exempt
- PR = Protected ranking
- ITF = ITF entry
- JE = Junior exempt
- w/o = Walkover
- r = Retired
- d = Defaulted
- SR = Special ranking

=== Draw ===
First round
1	(United States) P Galbraith (United States) J Pugh	2	7	6
(United States) C Beckman (Netherlands) M Schapers	6	5	4
Q	(South Africa) M Barnard (Sweden) P Nyborg	7	7
(New Zealand) K Evernden (Czechoslovakia) M Šrejber	6	6
3	(United States) T Pawsat (Australia) L Warder	6	6
(United States) B Garrow (United States) S Salumaa	3	4
(United Kingdom) N Brown (United States) K Jones	7	6
(United States) P Chamberlin (United States) T Wilkison	6	4
WC	(United Kingdom) C Bailey (United Kingdom) D Sapsford	2	6	3
(Austria) A Antonitsch (United Kingdom) A Castle	6	4	6
LL	(Australia) R Fromberg (United States) J Tarango	3	5
4	(United States) P Annacone (South Africa) G Muller	6	7
(Argentina) G Luza (United States) B Shelton	6	6
(United Kingdom) J Bates (United States) P Sampras	7	7
(United States) B Pearce (United States) J Rive	4	4
2	(Australia) M Kratzmann (Australia) J Stoltenberg	6	6

Quarterfinals
1	(United States) P Galbraith (United States) J Pugh	6	3	7
Q	(South Africa) M Barnard (Sweden) P Nyborg	2	6	6
3	(United States) T Pawsat (Australia) L Warder	3	7	2
(United Kingdom) N Brown (United States) K Jones	6	6	6
(Austria) A Antonitsch (United Kingdom) A Castle	6	6
4	(United States) P Annacone (South Africa) G Muller	2	4
(United Kingdom) J Bates (United States) P Sampras	6	2
2	(Australia) M Kratzmann (Australia) J Stoltenberg	7	6

Semifinals
1	(United States) P Galbraith (United States) J Pugh	7	6	4
(United Kingdom) N Brown (United States) K Jones	5	7	6
(Austria) A Antonitsch (United Kingdom) A Castle	4	6
2	(Australia) M Kratzmann (Australia) J Stoltenberg	6	7

Final
(United Kingdom) N Brown (United States) K Jones	3	6	4
2	(Australia) M Kratzmann (Australia) J Stoltenberg	6	2	6
