= 1991 Manchester Open – Singles =

Singles
- 1991 Manchester Open

Final
- Champion: (Croatia) Goran Ivanišević
- Runner-up: (United States) Pete Sampras
- Score: 6–4, 6–4

Details
- Draw: 32
- Seeds: 8

Events
| Singles | Doubles |
| ← 1990 · | Manchester Open | · 1992 → |

Goran Ivanišević defeated Pete Sampras 6–4, 6–4 in the final to secure the title.

== Seeds ==
1. (United States) Pete Sampras (final)
2. (Croatia) Goran Ivanišević (champion)
3. (United States) John McEnroe (first round)
4. (United States) Brad Gilbert (first round)
5. (Croatia) Goran Prpić (first round)
6. (Soviet Union) Alexander Volkov (second round)
7. (United States) Derrick Rostagno (second round)
8. (Austria) Horst Skoff (first round)

== Draw ==
=== Key ===
- Q = Qualifier
- WC = Wild card
- LL = Lucky loser
- Alt = Alternate
- SE = Special exempt
- PR = Protected ranking
- ITF = ITF entry
- JE = Junior exempt
- w/o = Walkover
- r = Retired
- d = Defaulted
- SR = Special ranking

=== Finals ===
Semifinals
1 | (United States) Pete Sampras | 6 | 7
(Finland) Veli Paloheimo | 4 | 5
(South Africa) Gary Muller | 6^{9} | 6^{4}
Q/2 | (Croatia) Goran Ivanišević | 7^{11} | 7^{7}

Final
1 | (United States) Pete Sampras | 4 | 4
Q/2 | (Croatia) Goran Ivanišević | 6 | 6

=== Section 1 ===
First round
1 | (United States) P Sampras | 7 | 4 | 6
(Sweden) C Bergström | 5 | 6 | 2
Q | (Venezuela) N Pereira | 6^{2} | 7^{7} | 3
(United States) M Washington | 7^{7} | 6^{4} | 6
(Australia) W Masur | 6 | 3 | 6
(United States) J Grabb | 4 | 6 | 3
(Germany) C Saceanu | 6 | 1 | 5
7 | (United States) D Rostagno | 4 | 6 | 7
4 | (United States) B Gilbert | 2 | 0
(Israel) G Bloom | 6 | 6
(Netherlands) J Siemerink | 6^{2} | 2
(Finland) V Paloheimo | 7^{7} | 6
WC | (United Kingdom) M Petchey | 1 | 7 | 2
(Sweden) P Lundgren | 6 | 5 | 6
(Israel) A Mansdorf | 3 | 6 | 6
5 | (Socialist Federal Republic of Yugoslavia) G Prpić | 6 | 3 | 3

Second round
1 | (United States) P Sampras | 7^{7} | 4 | 6
(United States) M Washington | 6^{5} | 6 | 2
(Australia) W Masur | 6 | 6
7 | (United States) D Rostagno | 4 | 4
(Israel) G Bloom | 7^{7} | 4 | 5
(Finland) V Paloheimo | 6^{2} | 6 | 7
(Sweden) P Lundgren | 6^{5} | 6^{1}
(Israel) A Mansdorf | 7^{7} | 7^{7}

Quarterfinals
1 | (United States) P Sampras | 7 | 6
(Australia) W Masur | 5 | 2
(Finland) V Paloheimo | 3 | 6 | 6
(Israel) A Mansdorf | 6 | 3 | 4

Semifinals
1 | (United States) P Sampras | 6 | 7
(Finland) V Paloheimo | 4 | 5

=== Section 2 ===
First round
6 | (Soviet Union) A Volkov | 6 | 7^{7}
(Brazil) L Mattar | 2 | 6^{1}
Q | (Canada) C Pridham | 2 | 5
(South Africa) G Muller | 6 | 7
(United States) T Witsken | 7^{9} | 6
(Germany) E Jelen | 6^{7} | 1
(Italy) C Caratti | 7^{7} | 7^{7}
3 | (United States) J McEnroe | 6^{5} | 6^{5}
8 | (Austria) H Skoff | 4 | 6^{1}
Q | (Germany) A Thoms | 6 | 7^{7}
(Netherlands) R Krajicek | 6 | 2 | 4
(Italy) O Camporese | 3 | 6 | 6
WC | (United Kingdom) J Bates | 6 | 7^{7}
(Netherlands) P Haarhuis | 4 | 6^{4}
WC | (United Kingdom) A Castle | 5 | 6^{3}
Q/2 | (Croatia) G Ivanišević | 7 | 7^{7}

Second round
6 | (Soviet Union) A Volkov | 6^{3} | 6^{4}
(South Africa) G Muller | 7^{7} | 7^{7}
(United States) T Witsken | 6 | 6
(Italy) C Caratti | 3 | 4
Q | (Germany) A Thoms | 2 | 7^{9} | 7
(Italy) O Camporese | 6 | 6^{7} | 5
WC | (United Kingdom) J Bates | 3 | 4
Q/2 | (Croatia) G Ivanišević | 6 | 6

Quarterfinals
(South Africa) G Muller | 3 | 7^{7} | 6
(United States) T Witsken | 6 | 6^{3} | 2
Q | (Germany) A Thoms | 5 | 3
2 | (Croatia) G Ivanišević | 7 | 6

Semifinals
(South Africa) G Muller | 6^{9} | 6^{4}
Q/2 | (Croatia) G Ivanišević | 7^{11} | 7^{7}
