= 1992 Manchester Open – Doubles =

Doubles
- 1992 Manchester Open

Final
- Champions: (United States) Patrick Galbraith (Australia) David Macpherson
- Runners-up: (United Kingdom) Jeremy Bates (Australia) Laurie Warder
- Score: 4–6, 6–3, 6–2

Details
- Draw: 16
- Seeds: 4

Events
| Singles | Doubles |
| ← 1991 · | Manchester Open | · 1993 → |

Omar Camporese and Goran Ivanišević were the defending champions, but did not participate this year.

Patrick Galbraith and David Macpherson won the title, defeating Jeremy Bates and Laurie Warder 4–6, 6–3, 6–2 in the final.

== Seeds ==
1. (United States) Patrick Galbraith / (Australia) David Macpherson (champions)
2. (Argentina) Javier Frana / (Mexico) Leonardo Lavalle (first round)
3. (South Africa) Pieter Aldrich / (South Africa) Danie Visser (first round)
4. (United States) Mike Briggs / (United States) Trevor Kronemann (semifinals)

== Draw ==
=== Key ===
- Q = Qualifier
- WC = Wild card
- LL = Lucky loser
- Alt = Alternate
- SE = Special exempt
- PR = Protected ranking
- ITF = ITF entry
- JE = Junior exempt
- w/o = Walkover
- r = Retired
- d = Defaulted
- SR = Special ranking

=== Draw ===
First round
1 | (United States) P Galbraith (Australia) D Macpherson | 7 | 7
(United States) P Annacone (South Africa) G Muller | 6 | 6
(United Kingdom) N Broad (South Africa) B Talbot | 7 | 5 | 6
(United Kingdom) A Castle (Italy) G Pozzi | 6 | 7 | 7
4 | (United States) M Briggs (United States) T Kronemann | 6 | 6
(South Africa) D Adams (Australia) B Dyke | 3 | 2
(Netherlands) J Eltingh (Netherlands) M Schapers | 6 | 6
(Sweden) R Bergh (South Africa) S Kruger | 3 | 4
(United States) S Salumaa (Sweden) T Svantesson | 6 | 7 | 6
WC | (United Kingdom) A Foster (United Kingdom) M Petchey | 7 | 6 | 7
(United Kingdom) J Bates (Australia) L Warder | 7 | 7
3 | (South Africa) P Aldrich (South Africa) D Visser | 6 | 6
(United States) B Shelton (United States) T Witsken | 2 | 7 | 6
(United States) J Brown (Netherlands) HJ Davids | 6 | 5 | 4
Q | (Commonwealth of Independent States) A Chesnokov (Mexico) L Herrera | 6 | 6 | 7
2 | (Argentina) J Frana (Mexico) L Lavalle | 7 | 3 | 6

Quarterfinals
1 | (United States) P Galbraith (Australia) D Macpherson | 6 | 6
(United Kingdom) A Castle (Italy) G Pozzi | 3 | 4
4 | (United States) M Briggs (United States) T Kronemann | 7 | 5 | 6
(Netherlands) J Eltingh (Netherlands) M Schapers | 5 | 7 | 4
WC | (United Kingdom) A Foster (United Kingdom) M Petchey | 3 | 4
(United Kingdom) J Bates (Australia) L Warder | 6 | 6
(United States) B Shelton (United States) T Witsken | 6 | 6
Q | (Commonwealth of Independent States) A Chesnokov (Mexico) L Herrera | 4 | 3

Semifinals
1 | (United States) P Galbraith (Australia) D Macpherson | 6 | 6
4 | (United States) M Briggs (United States) T Kronemann | 4 | 4
(United Kingdom) J Bates (Australia) L Warder | 6 | 6
(United States) B Shelton (United States) T Witsken | 3 | 4

Final
1 | (United States) P Galbraith (Australia) D Macpherson | 4 | 6 | 6
(United Kingdom) J Bates (Australia) L Warder | 6 | 3 | 2
