= 1990 Torneo Internazionale Città di Firenze – Singles =

Singles
- 1990 Torneo Internazionale Città di Firenze

Final
- Champion: (Sweden) Magnus Larsson
- Runner-up: (United States) Lawson Duncan
- Score: 6–7, 7–5, 6–0

Details
- Draw: 32 (3WC/4Q/1LL)
- Seeds: 8

Events
Singles	Doubles
← 1989 ·	ATP Florence	· 1991 →

Horacio de la Peña was the defending champion, but lost in the second round to Omar Camporese.

Magnus Larsson won the title by defeating Lawson Duncan 6–7, 7–5, 6–0 in the final.

== Seeds ==
1. (Argentina) Guillermo Pérez Roldán (quarterfinals)
2. (Austria) Horst Skoff (first round)
3. (Argentina) Alberto Mancini (second round)
4. (Argentina) Franco Davín (first round)
5. (Spain) Javier Sánchez (quarterfinals)
6. (Haiti) Ronald Agénor (second round)
7. (Spain) Sergi Bruguera (first round)
8. (Brazil) Luiz Mattar (first round)

== Draw ==
=== Key ===
- Q = Qualifier
- WC = Wild card
- LL = Lucky loser
- Alt = Alternate
- ITF = ITF entry
- PR = Protected ranking
- SR = Special ranking
- SE = Special exempt
- JE = Junior exempt
- JR = Junior Accelerator Programme entrant
- CO = College Accelerator Programme entrant
- NG = Next Gen Accelerator Program entrant
- w/o = Walkover
- r = Retired
- d = Defaulted

=== Finals ===
Semifinals
Q	(Sweden) Magnus Larsson	6	6
(Finland) Aki Rahunen	4	4
(United States) Lawson Duncan	6	6
(Italy) Omar Camporese	2	3

Final
Q	(Sweden) Magnus Larsson	6	7	6
(United States) Lawson Duncan	7	5	0

=== Top half ===
First round
1	(Argentina) G Pérez Roldán	4	7	7
LL	(France) C Pioline	6	5	6
(West Germany) U Riglewski	6	6
(France) T Tulasne	1	1
(Spain) JF Altur	6	2	6
(Netherlands) M Koevermans	4	6	7
Q	(Sweden) M Larsson	6	6
8	(Brazil) L Mattar	3	2
3/WC	(Argentina) A Mancini	6	7
Q	(Spain) M Górriz	2	6
(Brazil) C Motta	4	5
(Finland) A Rahunen	6	7
Q	(Spain) F Clavet	6	7
(Socialist Federal Republic of Yugoslavia) B Orešar	1	6
(Argentina) R Azar	1	6	1
5	(Spain) J Sánchez	6	3	6

Second round
1	(Argentina) G Pérez Roldán	6	6	6
(West Germany) U Riglewski	7	1	4
(Netherlands) M Koevermans	6	3	6
Q	(Sweden) M Larsson	3	6	7
3/WC	(Argentina) A Mancini	6	2	3
(Finland) A Rahunen	2	6	6
Q	(Spain) F Clavet	6	0
5	(Spain) J Sánchez	7	6

Quarterfinals
1	(Argentina) G Pérez Roldán	5	4
Q	(Sweden) M Larsson	7	6
(Finland) A Rahunen	6	4	7
5	(Spain) J Sánchez	4	6	5

Semifinals
Q	(Sweden) M Larsson	6	6
(Finland) A Rahunen	4	4

=== Bottom half ===
First round
6/WC	(Haiti) R Agénor	7	7
(Soviet Union) A Cherkasov	6	6
(Spain) T Carbonell	6	6
(Canada) A Sznajder	2	2
(Uruguay) D Pérez	6	5	6
(Italy) C Pistolesi	2	7	2
(United States) L Duncan	2	7	6
4	(Argentina) F Davín	6	6	2
7/WC	(Spain) S Bruguera	5	4
(Spain) F Luna	7	6
(France) T Benhabiles	4	3
(Argentina) E Bengoechea	6	6
Q	(Argentina) H de la Peña	7	6
(Canada) M Wostenholme	6	1
(Italy) O Camporese	6	6
2	(Austria) H Skoff	2	0

Second round
6/WC	(Haiti) R Agénor	3	0
(Spain) T Carbonell	6	6
(Uruguay) D Pérez	3	1
(United States) L Duncan	6	6
(Spain) F Luna	6	6
(Argentina) E Bengoechea	1	1
Q	(Argentina) H de la Peña	3	4
(Italy) O Camporese	6	6

Quarterfinals
(Spain) T Carbonell	5	3
(United States) L Duncan	7	6
(Spain) F Luna	1	6
(Italy) O Camporese	6	7

Semifinals
(United States) L Duncan	6	6
(Italy) O Camporese	2	3
