= 1990 Manchester Open =

- Date: 18–25 June
- Edition: 1st
- Category: ATP World Series
- Draw: 32S / 16D
- Prize money: $225,000
- Surface: Grass / outdoor
- Location: Manchester, United Kingdom
- Venue: Northern Lawn Tennis Club

Champions

Singles
- (United States) Pete Sampras

Doubles
- (Australia) Mark Kratzmann / (Australia) Jason Stoltenberg
Manchester Open	· 1991 →

The 1990 Manchester Open, also known by its sponsored name Direct Line Insurance Manchester Open, was an ATP men's tennis tournament held at the Northern Lawn Tennis Club in West Didsbury, Manchester in the United Kingdom and played on outdoor grass courts that was part of the World Series of the 1990 ATP Tour. It was the inaugural edition of the tournament and was held from 18 to 25 June 1990. Second-seeded Pete Sampras won the singles title, his first on grass, by defeating Gilad Bloom in the final.

== Finals ==
=== Singles ===
(United States) Pete Sampras defeated (Israel) Gilad Bloom 7–6^{(11–9)}, 7–6^{(7–3)}

- It was Sampras 2nd singles title of the year and of his career.

=== Doubles ===
(Australia) Mark Kratzmann / (Australia) Jason Stoltenberg defeated (United Kingdom) Nick Brown / (United States) Kelly Jones 6–3, 2–6, 6–4
