= 1989 Stella Artois Indoor – Singles =

Singles
- 1989 Stella Artois Indoor
- 1988 Champion: (France) Yannick Noah

Final
- Champion: (West Germany) Boris Becker
- Runner-up: (Soviet Union) Alexander Volkov
- Score: 6–1, 6–2

Details
- Draw: 32
- Seeds: 8

Events
Singles	Doubles
- Milan Indoor

Yannick Noah was the defending champion but lost in the second round to Slobodan Živojinović.

Boris Becker won in the final 6–1, 6–2 against Alexander Volkov.

== Seeds ==
A champion seed is indicated in bold text while text in italics indicates the round in which that seed was eliminated.

1. (West Germany) **Boris Becker (champion)**
2. (Czechoslovakia) Miloslav Mečíř (first round)
3. (United States) John McEnroe (semifinals)
4. (Switzerland) Jakob Hlasek (second round)
5. (France) Henri Leconte (first round)
6. (France) Yannick Noah (second round)
7. (Sweden) Jonas Svensson (second round)
8. n/a

== Draw ==
Key

- Q = Qualifier
- WC = Wild card
- LL = Lucky loser
- Alt = Alternate
- ITF = ITF entry
- PR = Protected ranking
- SR = Special ranking
- SE = Special exempt
- JE = Junior exempt
- JR = Junior Accelerator Programme entrant
- CO = College Accelerator Programme entrant
- NG = Next Gen Accelerator Program entrant
- w/o = Walkover
- r = Retired
- d = Defaulted

First round
1	(West Germany) **B Becker**	6	**6**	**6**
(Haiti) R Agénor	**7**	2	1
(France) **G Forget**	6	**6**	**6**
(Sweden) A Järryd	**7**	3	4
(Sweden) **C Bergström**	**6**	**6**
(West Germany) P Kühnen	4	4
(Czechoslovakia) **M Šrejber**	**7**	**6**
LL	(Belgium) E Masso	5	2
3	(United States) **J McEnroe**	**6**	**6**
(West Germany) C-U Steeb	3	2
(Netherlands) **M Schapers**	**6**	**6**
Q	(Sweden) D Engel	4	4
(Australia) **W Masur**	**6**	1	**6**
(Sweden) J Nyström	1	**6**	1
Q	(Soviet Union) **A Cherkasov**	**7**	4	**6**
5	(France) H Leconte	6	**6**	3
6	(France) **Y Noah**	**6**	6	**7**
(Soviet Union) A Olhovskiy	3	**7**	6
(Senegal) Y Doumbia	**6**	3	4
(Socialist Federal Republic of Yugoslavia) **S Živojinović**	3	**6**	**6**
WC	(Socialist Federal Republic of Yugoslavia) G Ivanišević	4	**6**	4
(Soviet Union) **A Volkov**	**6**	3	**6**
Q	(Socialist Federal Republic of Yugoslavia) M Ostoja	6	1
4	(Switzerland) **J Hlasek**	**7**	**6**
7	(Sweden) **J Svensson**	**6**	**6**
WC	(Italy) M Narducci	4	2
(Sweden) M Gustafsson	4	2
(West Germany) **E Jelen**	**6**	**6**
Q	(Spain) T Carbonell	3	2
(Italy) **P Canè**	**6**	**6**
WC	(Italy) **O Camporese**	**6**	**7**
2	(Czechoslovakia) M Mečíř	4	6

Second round
1	(West Germany) **B Becker**	**6**	**7**
(France) G Forget	3	6
(Sweden) **C Bergström**	**6**	2	**6**
(Czechoslovakia) M Šrejber	3	**6**	4
3	(United States) **J McEnroe**	**6**	**6**
(Netherlands) M Schapers	2	3
(Australia) W Masur	6	**7**	6
Q	(Soviet Union) **A Cherkasov**	**7**	5	**7**
6	(France) Y Noah	6	6
(Socialist Federal Republic of Yugoslavia) **S Živojinović**	**7**	**7**
(Soviet Union) **A Volkov**	**7**	**7**
4	(Switzerland) J Hlasek	6	5
7	(Sweden) J Svensson	4	0
(West Germany) **E Jelen**	**6**	**6**
(Italy) **P Canè**	**6**	**6**
WC	(Italy) O Camporese	4	3

Quarterfinals
1	(West Germany) **B Becker**	**7**	**7**
(Sweden) C Bergström	6	5
3	(United States) **J McEnroe**	**6**	**6**
Q	(Soviet Union) A Cherkasov	2	2
(Socialist Federal Republic of Yugoslavia) S Živojinović	6	3
(Soviet Union) **A Volkov**	**7**	**6**
(West Germany) **E Jelen**	**6**	**6**
(Italy) P Canè	1	2

Semifinals
1	(West Germany) **B Becker**	**6**	**6**
3	(United States) J McEnroe	2	3
(Soviet Union) **A Volkov**	**6**	2	**7**
(West Germany) E Jelen	2	**6**	6

Final
1	(West Germany) **Boris Becker**	**6**	**6**
(Soviet Union) Alexander Volkov	1	2
