= 1994 Manchester Open – Doubles =

Doubles
- 1994 Manchester Open

Final
- Champions: (United States) Rick Leach (South Africa) Danie Visser
- Runners-up: (United States) Scott Davis (United States) Trevor Kronemann
- Score: 6–4, 4–6, 7–6

Events
Singles	Doubles
← 1993 ·	Manchester Open

Ken Flach and Rick Leach were the defending champions, but Flach did not participate this year. Leach partnered Danie Visser.

Leach and Visser won the title, defeating Scott Davis and Trevor Kronemann 6–4, 4–6, 7–6 in the final.

== Seeds ==
1. (Sweden) Jan Apell / (Sweden) Jonas Björkman (semifinals)
2. (Czech Republic) Martin Damm / (Russia) Andrei Olhovskiy (semifinals)
3. (United States) Rick Leach / (South Africa) Danie Visser (champions)
4. (South Africa) Brent Haygarth / (United States) Brad Pearce (quarterfinals)

== Draw ==
=== Key ===
- Q = Qualifier
- WC = Wild card
- LL = Lucky loser
- Alt = Alternate
- SE = Special exempt
- PR = Protected ranking
- ITF = ITF entry
- JE = Junior exempt
- w/o = Walkover
- r = Retired
- d = Defaulted
- SR = Special ranking

=== Draw ===
First round
1	(Sweden) J Apell (Sweden) J Björkman	6	6
WC	(United Kingdom) T Henman (United Kingdom) M Petchey	2	4
(Australia) D Cahill (Australia) M Kratzmann	6	7
(Argentina) P Albano (Argentina) J Frana	4	6
4	(South Africa) B Haygarth (United States) B Pearce	7	7
(South Africa) R Deppe (United States) D Pate	5	6
(United States) S Davis (United States) T Kronemann	6	6
WC	(United Kingdom) A Foster (United Kingdom) M MacLagan	3	2
(Venezuela) M Ruah (France) S Simian	4	6	7
(Czech Republic) K Nováček (Australia) L Warder	6	4	6
(United States) S DeVries (United States) D Johnson	6	4
3	(United States) R Leach (South Africa) D Visser	7	6
(United Kingdom) J Bates (South Africa) C van Rensburg	7	7
Q	(United Kingdom) C Bailey (United Kingdom) B Cowan	5	6
(United States) B Garnett (United States) TJ Middleton	4	3
2	(Czech Republic) M Damm (Russia) A Olhovskiy	6	6

Quarterfinals
1	(Sweden) J Apell (Sweden) J Björkman	6	6
(Australia) D Cahill (Australia) M Kratzmann	4	2
4	(South Africa) B Haygarth (United States) B Pearce	2	6
(United States) S Davis (United States) T Kronemann	6	7
(Venezuela) M Ruah (France) S Simian	3	4
3	(United States) R Leach (South Africa) D Visser	6	6
(United Kingdom) J Bates (South Africa) C van Rensburg	6	0
2	(Czech Republic) M Damm (Russia) A Olhovskiy	7	6

Semifinals
1	(Sweden) J Apell (Sweden) J Björkman	7	3	3
(United States) S Davis (United States) T Kronemann	5	6	6
3	(United States) R Leach (South Africa) D Visser	3	6	7
2	(Czech Republic) M Damm (Russia) A Olhovskiy	6	3	6

Final
(United States) S Davis (United States) T Kronemann	4	6	6
3	(United States) R Leach (South Africa) D Visser	6	4	7
