= 1993 Manchester Open – Doubles =

Doubles
- 1993 Manchester Open

Final
- Champions: (United States) Ken Flach (United States) Rick Leach
- Runners-up: (South Africa) Stefan Kruger (Canada) Glenn Michibata
- Score: 6–4, 6–1

Events
Singles	Doubles
← 1992 ·	Manchester Open	· 1994 →

Patrick Galbraith and David Macpherson were the defending champions, but Galbraith did not participate this year. Macpherson partnered Steve DeVries, losing in the first round.

Ken Flach and Rick Leach won the title, defeating Stefan Kruger and Glenn Michibata 6–4, 6–1 in the final.

== Seeds ==
1. (South Africa) Danie Visser / (Australia) Laurie Warder (first round)
2. (United States) Steve DeVries / (Australia) David Macpherson (first round)
3. (United States) Ken Flach / (United States) Rick Leach (champions)
4. (South Africa) Stefan Kruger / (Canada) Glenn Michibata (final)

== Draw ==
=== Key ===
- Q = Qualifier
- WC = Wild card
- LL = Lucky loser
- Alt = Alternate
- SE = Special exempt
- PR = Protected ranking
- ITF = ITF entry
- JE = Junior exempt
- w/o = Walkover
- r = Retired
- d = Defaulted
- SR = Special ranking

=== Draw ===
First round
1	(South Africa) D Visser (Australia) L Warder	6	6
(United Kingdom) J Bates (Zimbabwe) B Black	7	7
WC	(United Kingdom) A Foster (United Kingdom) M Petchey	6	1	7
(United States) B Shelton (Czech Republic) D Vacek	4	6	6
3	(United States) K Flach (United States) R Leach	4	7	7
(Argentina) P Albano (Argentina) J Frana	6	6	6
(Netherlands) J Eltingh (Switzerland) M Rosset	4	6	7
(United States) B Garnett (United States) TJ Middleton	6	3	6
Q	(France) R Gilbert (France) S Simian	3	6
(United States) M Briggs (United States) T Kronemann	6	7
WC	(United Kingdom) C Bailey (United Kingdom) R Matheson	3	6	4
4	(South Africa) S Kruger (Canada) G Michibata	6	4	6
(Sweden) R Bergh (South Africa) B Talbot	6	7
(Norway) B-O Pedersen (New Zealand) B Steven	3	6
(South Africa) B Haygarth (Venezuela) N Pereira	6	3	7
2	(United States) S DeVries (Australia) D Macpherson	4	6	6

Quarterfinals
(United Kingdom) J Bates (Zimbabwe) B Black	6	6
WC	(United Kingdom) A Foster (United Kingdom) M Petchey	4	4
3	(United States) K Flach (United States) R Leach	6	4	6
(Netherlands) J Eltingh (Switzerland) M Rosset	4	6	3
(United States) M Briggs (United States) T Kronemann	6	4	4
4	(South Africa) S Kruger (Canada) G Michibata	4	6	6
(Sweden) R Bergh (South Africa) B Talbot	6	7	5
(South Africa) B Haygarth (Venezuela) N Pereira	7	6	7

Semifinals
(United Kingdom) J Bates (Zimbabwe) B Black	4	6	6
3	(United States) K Flach (United States) R Leach	6	3	7
4	(South Africa) S Kruger (Canada) G Michibata	6	2
(South Africa) B Haygarth (Venezuela) N Pereira	3	1^{r}

Final
3	(United States) K Flach (United States) R Leach	6	6
4	(South Africa) S Kruger (Canada) G Michibata	4	1
