= 1992 Manchester Open =

1992 tennis tournament

- Date: 15–22 June
- Edition: 3rd
- Category: ATP World Series
- Draw: 32S / 16D
- Prize money: $235,000
- Surface: Grass / outdoor
- Location: Manchester, United Kingdom
- Venue: Northern Lawn Tennis Club

Champions

Singles
- (Netherlands) Jacco Eltingh

Doubles
- (United States) Patrick Galbraith / (Australia) David Macpherson
| ← 1991 · | Manchester Open | · 1993 → |

The 1992 Manchester Open was the third edition of the Manchester Open tennis tournament and was played on outdoor grass courts. The tournament was part of the ATP World Series and was held from 15 June until 22 June 1992 at the Northern Lawn Tennis Club in Manchester, United Kingdom.

In singles, Jacco Eltingh won his 5th career title and his only title of the year by defeating MaliVai Washington in the final.

== Finals ==
=== Singles ===
(Netherlands) Jacco Eltingh defeated (United States) MaliVai Washington 6–3, 6–4

- It was Eltingh's only singles title of the year and the first of his career.

=== Doubles ===
(United States) Patrick Galbraith / (Australia) David Macpherson defeated (United Kingdom) Jeremy Bates / (Australia) Laurie Warder 4–6, 6–3, 6–2
