= 1990 Torneo Internazionale Città di Firenze =

Tennis tournament in Florence, Italy

- Date: 11–17 June
- Edition: 18th
- Category: World Series
- Draw: 32S / 16D
- Prize money: $225,000
- Surface: Clay / outdoor
- Location: Florence, Italy

Champions

Singles
- (Sweden) Magnus Larsson

Doubles
- (Spain) Sergi Bruguera / (Argentina) Horacio de la Peña
- ATP Florence

The 1990 Torneo Internazionale Città di Firenze, also known as the ATP Florence, was a men's tennis tournament played on outdoor clay courts in Florence, Italy that was part of the World Series tier if the 1990 ATP Tour circuit. It was the 18th edition of the tournament and was played from 11 June until 17 June 1990. Unseeded Magnus Larsson, who entered the main draw as a qualifier, won the singles title.

== Finals ==
=== Singles ===
(Sweden) Magnus Larsson defeated (United States) Lawson Duncan 6–7, 7–5, 6–0

- It was Larsson's only singles title of the year and the 1st of his career.

=== Doubles ===
(Spain) Sergi Bruguera / (Argentina) Horacio de la Peña defeated (Brazil) Luiz Mattar / (Uruguay) Diego Pérez 3–6, 6–3, 6–4

- It was Bruguera's 2nd and last doubles title of the year and the 2nd of his career. It was de la Peña's only doubles title of the year and the 2nd of his career.
