= 1989 Stella Artois Indoor – Doubles =

Doubles
- 1989 Stella Artois Indoor

Final
- Champions: (Switzerland) Jakob Hlasek; (United States) John McEnroe
- Runners-up: (Switzerland) Heinz Günthardt; (Hungary) Balázs Taróczy
- Score: 6–3, 6–4

Details
- Draw: 16
- Seeds: 4

Events
Singles	Doubles
- Milan Indoor

The 1989 Stella Artois professional tennis tournament was part of the ATP World Tour and was held in Milan, Italy. Boris Becker and Eric Jelen were the defending champions but only Jelen competed in 1989 with Wally Masur. Jelen and Masur lost in the first round to Paolo Canè and Michael Mortensen.

Jakob Hlasek and John McEnroe won in the final 6–3, 6–4 against Heinz Günthardt and Balázs Taróczy.

== Seeds ==
Champion seeds are indicated in bold text while text in italics indicates the round in which those seeds were eliminated.

1. (West Germany) Eric Jelen / (Australia) Wally Masur (first round)
2. (Switzerland) **Jakob Hlasek** / (United States) **John McEnroe (champions)**
3. (West Germany) Patrik Kühnen / (West Germany) Carl-Uwe Steeb (first round)
4. (Switzerland) Claudio Mezzadri / (Italy) Diego Nargiso (quarterfinals)

== Draw ==
Key

- Q = Qualifier
- WC = Wild card
- LL = Lucky loser
- Alt = Alternate
- ITF = ITF entry
- PR = Protected ranking
- SR = Special ranking
- SE = Special exempt
- JE = Junior exempt
- JR = Junior Accelerator Programme entrant
- CO = College Accelerator Programme entrant
- NG = Next Gen Accelerator Program entrant
- w/o = Walkover
- r = Retired
- d = Defaulted

First round

Quarterfinals

Semifinals

Final

1
- (West Germany) E Jelen
- (Australia) W Masur
4
6

- (Italy) P Canè
- (Denmark) M Mortensen
**6**
**7**

- (Italy) P Canè
- (Denmark) M Mortensen
**7**
4
4

- (Socialist Federal Republic of Yugoslavia) G Ivanišević
- (Socialist Federal Republic of Yugoslavia) S Živojinović
**6**
**6**

- (Socialist Federal Republic of Yugoslavia) G Ivanišević
- (Socialist Federal Republic of Yugoslavia) S Živojinović
6
**6**
**6**

- (Sweden) M Gustafsson
- (Italy) C Panatta
3
3

- (Socialist Federal Republic of Yugoslavia) G Ivanišević
- (Socialist Federal Republic of Yugoslavia) S Živojinović

3
- (West Germany) P Kühnen
- (West Germany) C-U Steeb
5
3

- (Switzerland) H Günthardt
- (Hungary) B Taróczy
w/o

- (Switzerland) H Günthardt
- (Hungary) B Taróczy
**7**
**6**

- (Switzerland) H Günthardt
- (Hungary) B Taróczy
**6**
**6**

- (Soviet Union) A Olhovskiy
- (Netherlands) M Schapers
2
4

- (Soviet Union) A Chesnokov
- (Soviet Union) A Volkov
4
4

- (Soviet Union) A Chesnokov
- (Soviet Union) A Volkov
**6**
**6**

- (Switzerland) H Günthardt
- (Hungary) B Taróczy
3
4

- (Czechoslovakia) M Mečíř
- (Czechoslovakia) M Šrejber
**6**
6
4

2
- (Switzerland) J Hlasek
- (United States) J McEnroe
**6**
**6**

- (Italy) O Camporese
- (Italy) M Narducci
3
**7**
**6**

- (Italy) O Camporese
- (Italy) M Narducci
**6**
5
**6**

- (West Germany) T Meinecke
- (West Germany) R Osterthun
4
**6**
3

4
- (Switzerland) C Mezzadri
- (Italy) D Nargiso
4
**7**
3

4
- (Switzerland) C Mezzadri
- (Italy) D Nargiso
**6**
3
**6**

- (Italy) O Camporese
- (Italy) M Narducci
4
1

- (Sweden) A Järryd
- (Sweden) J Svensson
**6**
**6**

2
- (Switzerland) J Hlasek
- (United States) J McEnroe
**6**
**6**

- (Spain) T Carbonell
- (France) É Winogradsky
1
2

- (Sweden) A Järryd
- (Sweden) J Svensson
1
5

- (Italy) S Colombo
- (Italy) N Devide
4
1

2
- (Switzerland) J Hlasek
- (United States) J McEnroe
**6**
**7**

2
- (Switzerland) J Hlasek
- (United States) J McEnroe
**6**
**6**
