= 1994 Manchester Open – Singles =

Singles
- 1994 Manchester Open

Final
- Champion: (Australia) Patrick Rafter
- Runner-up: (United States) Wayne Ferreira
- Score: 7–6^{(7–5)}, 7–6^{(7–4)}

Details
- Draw: 32
- Seeds: 8

Events
Singles	Doubles
← 1993 ·	Manchester Open

Jason Stoltenberg was the defending champion but lost in the semifinals to Wayne Ferreira.

Patrick Rafter won in the final 7–6^{(7–5)}, 7–6^{(7–4)} against Ferreira.

== Seeds ==
1. (South Africa) Wayne Ferreira (final)
2. (Australia) Patrick Rafter (champion)
3. (Italy) Andrea Gaudenzi (first round)
4. (United States) MaliVai Washington (second round)
5. (Australia) Jason Stoltenberg (semifinals)
6. (Italy) Stefano Pescosolido (first round)
7. (Canada) Greg Rusedski (quarterfinals)
8. (Netherlands) Jacco Eltingh (quarterfinals)

== Draw ==
=== Key ===
- Q = Qualifier
- WC = Wild card
- LL = Lucky loser
- Alt = Alternate
- SE = Special exempt
- PR = Protected ranking
- ITF = ITF entry
- JE = Junior exempt
- w/o = Walkover
- r = Retired
- d = Defaulted
- SR = Special ranking

=== Finals ===
Semifinals
1	(South Africa) Wayne Ferreira	6	6
5	(Australia) Jason Stoltenberg	4	4
(Czech Republic) Karel Nováček	7^{7}	6^{4}	6^{5}
2	(Australia) Patrick Rafter	6^{4}	7^{7}	7^{7}

Final
1	(South Africa) Wayne Ferreira	6^{5}	6^{4}
2	(Australia) Patrick Rafter	7^{7}	7^{7}

=== Top half ===
First round
1	(South Africa) W Ferreira	6	6
Q	(Argentina) J Frana	3	4
(Russia) A Olhovskiy	6^{3}	3
(Sweden) J Björkman	7^{7}	6
(Sweden) J Apell	7	6^{4}	6^{6}
(France) G Raoux	5	7^{7}	7^{8}
(United States) C Adams	3	2
7	(Canada) G Rusedski	6	6
3	(Italy) A Gaudenzi	4	3
(Venezuela) M Ruah	6	6
WC	(United Kingdom) T Henman	6	4	0
Q	(United States) A O'Brien	1	6	6
Q	(United States) T Kronemann	4	2
Q	(Denmark) K Carlsen	6	6
(Austria) A Antonitsch	6^{3}	6	2
5	(Australia) J Stoltenberg	7^{7}	0	6

Second round
1	(South Africa) W Ferreira	7	3	6
(Sweden) J Björkman	5	6	3
(France) G Raoux	6^{5}	4
7	(Canada) G Rusedski	7^{7}	6
(Venezuela) M Ruah	4	6	6^{6}
Q	(United States) A O'Brien	6	4	7^{8}
Q	(Denmark) K Carlsen	1	6^{3}
5	(Australia) J Stoltenberg	6	7^{7}

Quarterfinals
1	(South Africa) W Ferreira	6	5	6
7	(Canada) G Rusedski	3	7	3
Q	(United States) A O'Brien	4	4
5	(Australia) J Stoltenberg	6	6

Semifinals
1	(South Africa) W Ferreira	6	6
5	(Australia) J Stoltenberg	4	4

=== Bottom half ===
First round
6	(Italy) S Pescosolido	6	3	1
(United States) S Bryan	4	6	6
(South Africa) C van Rensburg	0	6	5
WC	(United Kingdom) M Petchey	6	2	7
(Czech Republic) K Nováček	6	6
(South Africa) G Stafford	3	2
(New Zealand) B Steven	1	2
4	(United States) M Washington	6	6
8	(Netherlands) J Eltingh	7^{7}	6
(Zimbabwe) B Black	6^{5}	2
(Czech Republic) M Damm	7^{6}	6
(Sweden) C Bergström	6^{1}	2
(Italy) O Camporese	4	6	6
(United Kingdom) J Bates	6	1	4
WC	(United Kingdom) C Bailey	3	7^{7}	3
2	(Australia) P Rafter	6	6^{5}	6

Second round
(United States) S Bryan	3	4
WC	(United Kingdom) M Petchey	6	6
(Czech Republic) K Nováček	3	6	6
4	(United States) M Washington	6	3	1
8	(Netherlands) J Eltingh	6	6
(Czech Republic) M Damm	4	4
(Italy) O Camporese	1	6^{2}
2	(Australia) P Rafter	6	7^{7}

Quarterfinals
WC	(United Kingdom) M Petchey	4	1
(Czech Republic) K Nováček	6	6
8	(Netherlands) J Eltingh	6	4	2
2	(Australia) P Rafter	4	6	6

Semifinals
(Czech Republic) K Nováček	7^{7}	6^{4}	6^{5}
2	(Australia) P Rafter	6^{4}	7^{7}	7^{7}
