= 1992 Manchester Open – Singles =

Singles
- 1992 Manchester Open

Final
- Champion: (Netherlands) Jacco Eltingh
- Runner-up: (United States) MaliVai Washington
- Score: 6–3, 6–4

Details
- Draw: 32
- Seeds: 8

Events
Singles	Doubles
← 1991 ·	Manchester Open	· 1993 →

Jacco Eltingh defeated MaliVai Washington 6–3, 6–4 in the final to secure the title.

== Seeds ==
1. (Commonwealth of Independent States) Alexander Volkov (first round)
2. (United States) Brad Gilbert (quarterfinals)
3. (United States) David Wheaton (second round)
4. (Israel) Amos Mansdorf (first round)
5. (United States) MaliVai Washington (final)
6. (Commonwealth of Independent States) Andrei Cherkasov (first round)
7. (Commonwealth of Independent States) Andrei Chesnokov (first round)
8. (Italy) Omar Camporese (first round)

== Draw ==
=== Key ===
- Q = Qualifier
- WC = Wild card
- LL = Lucky loser
- Alt = Alternate
- SE = Special exempt
- PR = Protected ranking
- ITF = ITF entry
- JE = Junior exempt
- w/o = Walkover
- r = Retired
- d = Defaulted
- SR = Special ranking

=== Finals ===
Semifinals
(Australia) Wally Masur	2	6^{6}
(Netherlands) Jacco Eltingh	6	7^{8}
5	(United States) MaliVai Washington	6^{5}	6	6
Q	(Mexico) Luis Herrera	7^{7}	1	1

Final
(Netherlands) Jacco Eltingh	6	6
5	(United States) MaliVai Washington	3	4

=== Section 1 ===
First round
1	(Commonwealth of Independent States) A Volkov	3	6	5
(Australia) W Masur	6	4	7
(Italy) G Pozzi	5	7^{7}	6
(Netherlands) M Schapers	7	6^{2}	3
Q	(United Kingdom) A Castle	6	3	2
(Italy) D Nargiso	3	6	6
(United States) J Tarango	7^{8}	2	7^{14}
7	(Commonwealth of Independent States) A Chesnokov	6^{6}	6	6^{12}
WC/3	(United States) D Wheaton	4	7^{7}	7^{7}
(South Africa) C van Rensburg	6	6^{5}	6^{5}
(Netherlands) J Eltingh	6	6
(United States) K Curren	3	4
Q	(Germany) A Thoms	6	6
WC	(United Kingdom) C Wilkinson	4	2
LL	(United States) P Annacone	7^{7}	6^{2}	7^{9}
6	(Commonwealth of Independent States) A Cherkasov	6^{4}	7^{7}	6^{7}

Second round
(Australia) W Masur	6	7
(Italy) G Pozzi	3	5
(Italy) D Nargiso	6^{6}	6	4
(United States) J Tarango	7^{8}	0	6
WC/3	(United States) D Wheaton	4	4
(Netherlands) J Eltingh	6	6
Q	(Germany) A Thoms	1	7	6
LL	(United States) P Annacone	6	5	3

Quarterfinals
(Australia) W Masur	6	6
(United States) J Tarango	3	4
(Netherlands) J Eltingh	6	3
Q	(Germany) A Thoms	2	0^{r}

Semifinals
(Australia) W Masur	2	6^{3}
(Netherlands) J Eltingh	6	7^{7}

=== Section 2 ===
First round
5	(United States) M Washington	7^{7}	6
(Germany) P Kühnen	6^{5}	4
WC	(United Kingdom) J Bates	7	7
(France) R Gilbert	5	5
(Mexico) L Lavalle	7^{18}	5	5
(Australia) S Youl	6^{16}	7	7
(United States) T Witsken	7	7
4	(Israel) A Mansdorf	5	5
8	(Italy) O Camporese	6	6
Q	(Mexico) L Herrera	2	2
(Germany) M Naewie	6	3	4
(Germany) M Zoecke	4	6	1^{r}
Q	(South Africa) G Muller	7^{9}	6^{2}	6
(France) C Pioline	6^{7}	7^{7}	3
(United States) B Shelton	6^{6}	7^{7}	3
2	(United States) B Gilbert	7^{8}	6^{2}	6

Second round
5	(United States) M Washington	4	6	6
WC	(United Kingdom) J Bates	6	4	3
(Australia) S Youl	6	7^{7}
(United States) T Witsken	1	6^{5}
Q	(Mexico) L Herrera	6	7
(Germany) M Naewie	0	5
Q	(South Africa) G Muller	3	2
2	(United States) B Gilbert	6	6

Quarterfinals
5	(United States) M Washington	6	7
(Australia) S Youl	4	5
Q	(Mexico) L Herrera	3	6	7^{8}
2	(United States) B Gilbert	6	3	6^{6}

Semifinals
5	(United States) M Washington	6^{5}	6	6
Q	(Mexico) L Herrera	7^{7}	1	1
