= 1989 Torneo Internazionale Città di Firenze =

- Date: 22–28 May
- Edition: 17th
- Category: Grand Prix
- Draw: 32S / 16D
- Prize money: $93,400
- Surface: Clay / outdoor
- Location: Florence, Italy

Champions

Singles
- (Argentina) Horacio de la Peña

Doubles
- (United States) Mike De Palmer / (United States) Blaine Willenborg
- ATP Florence

The 1989 Torneo Internazionale Città di Firenze, also known by its sponsored name Volvo Classic, was a men's tennis tournament played on outdoor clay courts in Florence, Italy that was part of the 1989 Nabisco Grand Prix circuit. It was the 17th edition of the tournament and was played from 22 May until 28 May 1989. Sixth-seeded Horacio de la Peña won the singles title.

== Finals ==
=== Singles ===
(Argentina) Horacio de la Peña defeated (Socialist Federal Republic of Yugoslavia) Goran Ivanišević 6–4, 6–3

- It was De la Peña's only singles title of the year and the 2nd of his career.

=== Doubles ===
(United States) Mike De Palmer / (United States) Blaine Willenborg defeated (Italy) Pietro Pennisi / (Italy) Simone Restelli 4–6, 6–4, 6–4

- It was De Palmer's only doubles title of the year and the 6th and last of his career. It was Willenborg's only doubles title of the year and the 7th and last of his career.
