= 1979 Alitalia Florence Open =

- Date: 14–20 May
- Edition: 7th
- Category: Grand Prix
- Draw: 32S / 16D
- Prize money: $50,000
- Surface: Clay / outdoor
- Location: Florence, Italy

Champions

Singles
- (Mexico) Raúl Ramírez

Doubles
- (Italy) Corrado Barazzutti / (Italy) Adriano Panatta
- ATP Florence

The 1979 Alitalia Florence Open was a men's tennis tournament played on outdoor clay courts in Florence, Italy that was part of the 1979 Colgate-Palmolive Grand Prix circuit. It was the seventh edition of the tournament and was played from 14 May until 20 May 1979. Second-seeded Raúl Ramírez won the singles title.

== Finals ==
=== Singles ===
(Mexico) Raúl Ramírez defeated (West Germany) Karl Meiler 6–4, 1–6, 3–6, 7–5, 6–0

- It was Ramírez' 1st singles title of the year and the 15th of his career.

=== Doubles ===
(Italy) Paolo Bertolucci / (Italy) Adriano Panatta defeated (Czechoslovakia) Ivan Lendl / (Czechoslovakia) Pavel Složil 6–4, 6–3
