= 1993 Manchester Open – Singles =

Singles
- 1993 Manchester Open

Final
- Champion: (Australia) Jason Stoltenberg
- Runner-up: (Australia) Wally Masur
- Score: 6–1, 6–3

Details
- Draw: 32
- Seeds: 8

Events
Singles	Doubles
← 1992 ·	Manchester Open	· 1994 →

Jason Stoltenberg defeated Wally Masur 6–1, 6–3 in the final, in Manchester, England, to secure the title.

== Seeds ==
1. (United States) MaliVai Washington (first round)
2. (Sweden) Henrik Holm (semifinals)
3. (France) Cédric Pioline (quarterfinals)
4. (Australia) Wally Masur (final)
5. (Switzerland) Marc Rosset (first round)
6. (Russia) Andrei Chesnokov (second round)
7. (Australia) Richard Fromberg (second round)
8. (France) Guillaume Raoux (quarterfinals)

== Draw ==
=== Key ===
- Q = Qualifier
- WC = Wild card
- LL = Lucky loser
- Alt = Alternate
- SE = Special exempt
- PR = Protected ranking
- ITF = ITF entry
- JE = Junior exempt
- w/o = Walkover
- r = Retired
- d = Defaulted
- SR = Special ranking

=== Finals ===
Semifinals
(Australia) Jason Stoltenberg	6^{6}	6	6
(France) Stéphane Simian	7^{8}	2	3
4	(Australia) Wally Masur	6	6^{4}	7^{7}
2	(Sweden) Henrik Holm	4	7^{7}	6^{5}

Final
(Australia) Jason Stoltenberg	6	6
4	(Australia) Wally Masur	1	3

=== Section 1 ===
First round
1	(United States) M Washington	6^{5}	2
WC	(United Kingdom) C Bailey	7^{7}	6
(Japan) S Matsuoka	4	7	3
(Australia) J Stoltenberg	6	5	6
(France) R Gilbert	3	3
(Netherlands) J Eltingh	6	6
(Czech Republic) D Vacek	4	6^{4}
7	(Australia) R Fromberg	6	7^{7}
3	(France) C Pioline	6^{4}	7^{9}	6
(United States) C Adams	7^{7}	6^{7}	3
Q	(Belgium) D Norman	6	7^{7}
(United States) J Palmer	1	6^{3}
(France) S Simian	4	7^{7}	6
(Australia) J Morgan	6	6^{5}	3
(United States) B Shelton	4	4
6	(Russia) A Chesnokov	6	6

Second round
WC	(United Kingdom) C Bailey	5	3
(Australia) J Stoltenberg	7	6
(Netherlands) J Eltingh	6	7
7	(Australia) R Fromberg	3	5
3	(France) C Pioline	6	6
Q	(Belgium) D Norman	3	4
(France) S Simian	7^{7}	6^{2}	6
6	(Russia) A Chesnokov	6^{5}	7^{7}	3

Quarterfinals
(Australia) J Stoltenberg	6	6
(Netherlands) J Eltingh	2	4
3	(France) C Pioline	3	4
(France) S Simian	6	6

Semifinals
(Australia) J Stoltenberg	6^{6}	6	6
(France) S Simian	7^{8}	2	3

=== Section 2 ===
First round
5	(Switzerland) M Rosset	1	4
Q	(France) P Pech	6	6
Q	(Zimbabwe) B Black	6	3	5
(United Kingdom) J Bates	3	6	7
(Argentina) J Frana	5	4
WC	(United Kingdom) C Wilkinson	7	6
WC	(United Kingdom) R Matheson	4	4
4	(Australia) W Masur	6	6
8	(France) G Raoux	4	6	6
(Italy) G Pozzi	6	3	3
Q	(Venezuela) N Pereira	6^{6}	6	7^{7}
(United States) A O'Brien	7^{8}	3	6^{4}
(Sweden) A Järryd	7^{7}	6^{5}	6
(Mexico) L Herrera	6^{2}	7^{7}	4
(New Zealand) B Steven	6	5	4
2	(Sweden) H Holm	3	7	6

Second round
Q	(France) P Pech	4	2
(United Kingdom) J Bates	6	6
WC	(United Kingdom) C Wilkinson	3	7^{7}	3
4	(Australia) W Masur	6	6^{4}	6
8	(France) G Raoux	6	6
Q	(Venezuela) N Pereira	4	3
(Sweden) A Järryd	5	4
2	(Sweden) H Holm	7	6

Quarterfinals
(United Kingdom) J Bates	4	3
4	(Australia) W Masur	6	6
8	(France) G Raoux	4	6	1
2	(Sweden) H Holm	6	3	6

Semifinals
4	(Australia) W Masur	6	6^{4}	7^{7}
2	(Sweden) H Holm	4	7^{7}	6^{5}
