= 1993 Manchester Open =

- Date: 14–21 June
- Edition: 4th
- Category: ATP World Series
- Draw: 32S / 16D
- Prize money: $275,000
- Surface: Grass / outdoor
- Location: Manchester, United Kingdom

Champions

Singles
- (Australia) Jason Stoltenberg

Doubles
- (United States) Ken Flach / (United States) Rick Leach
← 1992 ·	Manchester Open	· 1994 →

The 1993 Manchester Open was the fourth edition of the Manchester Open tennis tournament in Manchester, United Kingdom and was played outdoor grass courts. The tournament was part of the ATP World Series and was held from 14 June to 21 June 1993.

Jason Stoltenberg won his 6th career title, his first singles title and his only title of the year by defeating Wally Masur in the final.

== Finals ==
=== Singles ===
(Australia) Jason Stoltenberg defeated (Australia) Wally Masur 6–1, 6–3

=== Doubles ===
(United States) Ken Flach / (United States) Rick Leach defeated (South Africa) Stefan Kruger / (Canada) Glenn Michibata 6–4, 6–1
