= 1988 Torneo Internazionale Città di Firenze =

- Date: 16–22 May
- Edition: 16th
- Category: Grand Prix
- Draw: 32S / 16D
- Prize money: $93,400
- Surface: Clay / outdoor
- Location: Florence, Italy

Champions

Singles
- (Italy) Massimiliano Narducci

Doubles
- (Argentina) Javier Frana / (Argentina) Christian Miniussi
- ATP Florence

The 1988 Torneo Internazionale Città di Firenze, also known by its sponsored name Volvo Classic, was a men's tennis tournament played on outdoor clay courts in Florence, Italy that was part of the 1988 Nabisco Grand Prix circuit. It was the 16th edition of the tournament and was played from 16 May until 22 May 1988. Unseeded Massimiliano Narducci won the singles title.

== Finals ==
=== Singles ===
(Italy) Massimiliano Narducci defeated (Italy) Claudio Panatta 3–6, 6–1, 6–4

- It was Narducci's only singles title of his career.

=== Doubles ===
(Argentina) Javier Frana / (Argentina) Christian Miniussi defeated (Italy) Claudio Pistolesi / (Austria) Horst Skoff 7–6, 6–4

- It was Frana's only doubles title of the year and the 1st of his career. It was Miniussi's 1st doubles title of the year and the 2nd of his career.
