= 1994 Manchester Open =

- Date: 13–20 June
- Edition: 5th
- Category: ATP World Series
- Draw: 32S / 16D
- Prize money: $290,000
- Surface: Grass / outdoor
- Location: Manchester, United Kingdom

Champions

Singles
- (Australia) Patrick Rafter

Doubles
- (United States) Rick Leach / (South Africa) Danie Visser
← 1993 ·	Manchester Open

The 1994 Manchester Open was a men's tennis tournament played on outdoor grass courts. It was the fifth and final edition of the Manchester Open tennis tournament and was part of the ATP World Series of the 1994 ATP Tour. It took place from 13 June through 20 June 1994. Second-seeded Patrick Rafter won the singles title.

== Finals ==
=== Singles ===
(Australia) Patrick Rafter defeated (South Africa) Wayne Ferreira, 7–6^{(7–5)}, 7–6^{(7–4)}

- It was Rafter's 1st singles title of his career.

=== Doubles ===
(United States) Rick Leach / (South Africa) Danie Visser defeated (United States) Scott Davis / (United States) Trevor Kronemann 6–4, 4–6, 7–6
