= 1989 Stella Artois Indoor =

Tennis tournament

- Date: 13–19 February
- Edition: 12th
- Category: Grand Prix (Super Series)
- Draw: 32S / 16D
- Prize money: $375,000
- Surface: Carpet / indoor
- Location: Milan, Italy
- Venue: Palatrussardi

Champions

Singles
- (West Germany) Boris Becker

Doubles
- (Switzerland) Jakob Hlasek / (United States) John McEnroe
- Milan Indoor

The 1989 Stella Artois Indoor was a men's tennis tournament played on indoor carpet courts at the Palatrussardi in Milan, Italy that was part of the Super Series of the 1989 Nabisco Grand Prix. The tournament was held from 13 February through 19 February 1989. First-seeded Boris Becker won the singles title.

== Finals ==
=== Singles ===
(West Germany) Boris Becker defeated (Soviet Union) Alexander Volkov 6–1, 6–2

- It was Becker's 1st singles title of the year and the 20th of his career.

=== Doubles ===
(Switzerland) Jakob Hlasek / (United States) John McEnroe defeated (Switzerland) Heinz Günthardt / (Hungary) Balázs Taróczy 6–3, 6–4

- It was Hlasek's 2nd title of the year and the 8th of his career. It was McEnroe's 1st title of the year and the 137th of his career.
