= 1990 Manchester Open – Singles =

Singles
- 1990 Manchester Open

Final
- Champion: (United States) Pete Sampras
- Runner-up: (Israel) Gilad Bloom
- Score: 7–6^{(11–9)}, 7–6^{(7–3)}

Details
- Draw: 32
- Seeds: 8

Events
Singles	Doubles
- Manchester Open

Second-seeded Pete Sampras defeated unseeded Gilad Bloom 7–6^{(11–9)}, 7–6^{(7–3)} in the final to secure the title.

== Seeds ==
1. (United States) Aaron Krickstein (first round)
2. (United States) Pete Sampras (champion)
3. (United States) Michael Chang (second round)
4. (Switzerland) Marc Rosset (first round)
5. (South Africa) Christo van Rensburg (quarterfinals)
6. (Australia) Richard Fromberg (second round)
7. (Austria) Alex Antonitsch (second round)
8. (United States) Dan Goldie (second round)

== Draw ==
Key

- Q = Qualifier
- WC = Wild card
- LL = Lucky loser
- Alt = Alternate
- ITF = ITF entry
- PR = Protected ranking
- SR = Special ranking
- SE = Special exempt
- JE = Junior exempt
- JR = Junior Accelerator Programme entrant
- CO = College Accelerator Programme entrant
- NG = Next Gen Accelerator Program entrant
- w/o = Walkover
- r = Retired
- d = Defaulted

=== Finals ===
Semifinals
(Israel) Gilad Bloom	6	7
WC	(United Kingdom) Nick Brown	4	6
(Germany) Eric Jelen	7	4	4
WC/2	(United States) Pete Sampras	6	6	6

Final
(Israel) Gilad Bloom	6	6
WC/2	(United States) Pete Sampras	7	7

=== Section 1 ===
First round
1	(United States) A Krickstein	4	0^{r}
(Finland) A Rahunen	6	1
(United States) J Pugh	4	6	6
(Israel) G Bloom	6	4	7
Q	(Netherlands) M Schapers	3	6
(United States) K Jones	6	7
Q	(United States) P Galbraith	3	6	2
7	(Austria) A Antonitsch	6	0	6
3	(United States) M Chang	6	6
(United States) M Washington	3	4
(United States) P Annacone	6	6	4
(Australia) M Kratzmann	7	4	6
(Sweden) T Högstedt	6	4	3
WC	(United Kingdom) N Brown	4	6	6
Q	(Sweden) P Nyborg	6	5
6	(Australia) R Fromberg	7	7

Second round
(Finland) A Rahunen	2	5
(Israel) G Bloom	6	7
(United States) K Jones	6	7
7	(Austria) A Antonitsch	3	6
3	(United States) M Chang	6	6
(Australia) M Kratzmann	7	7
WC	(United Kingdom) N Brown	7	2	6
6	(Australia) R Fromberg	6	6	0

Quarterfinals
(Israel) G Bloom	3	7	6
(United States) K Jones	6	6	1
(Australia) M Kratzmann	1	3
WC	(United Kingdom) N Brown	6	6

Semifinals
(Israel) G Bloom	6	7
WC	(United Kingdom) N Brown	4	6

=== Section 2 ===
First round
5	(South Africa) C van Rensburg	2	6	6
(United Kingdom) J Bates	6	4	4
(Germany) P Kühnen	4	6	7
WC	(United Kingdom) A Castle	6	3	5
(Germany) E Jelen	1	6	6
(Finland) V Paloheimo	6	2	3
(South Africa) G Muller	6	6	7
4	(Switzerland) M Rosset	7	4	6
8	(United States) D Goldie	7	4	6
(Czechoslovakia) M Šrejber	6	6	4
(New Zealand) K Evernden	5	6	6
(Germany) J Wöhrmann	7	4	2
(India) R Krishnan	7	1	3
Q	(United States) J Rive	6	6	6
SE	(Soviet Union) A Volkov	6	6	6
WC/2	(United States) P Sampras	4	7	7

Second round
5	(South Africa) C van Rensburg	6	6
(Germany) P Kühnen	3	3
(Germany) E Jelen	7	7
(South Africa) G Muller	6	6
8	(United States) D Goldie	6	7	3
(New Zealand) K Evernden	7	6	6
Q	(United States) J Rive	6	3	2
WC/2	(United States) P Sampras	4	6	6

Quarterfinals
5	(South Africa) C van Rensburg	2	4
(Germany) E Jelen	6	6
(New Zealand) K Evernden	3	6
WC/2	(United States) P Sampras	6	7

Semifinals
(Germany) E Jelen	7	4	4
WC/2	(United States) P Sampras	6	6	6
