= Northern Lawn Tennis Club =

Tennis club in Manchester, England

Coordinates: 53.4235°N 2.2372°W

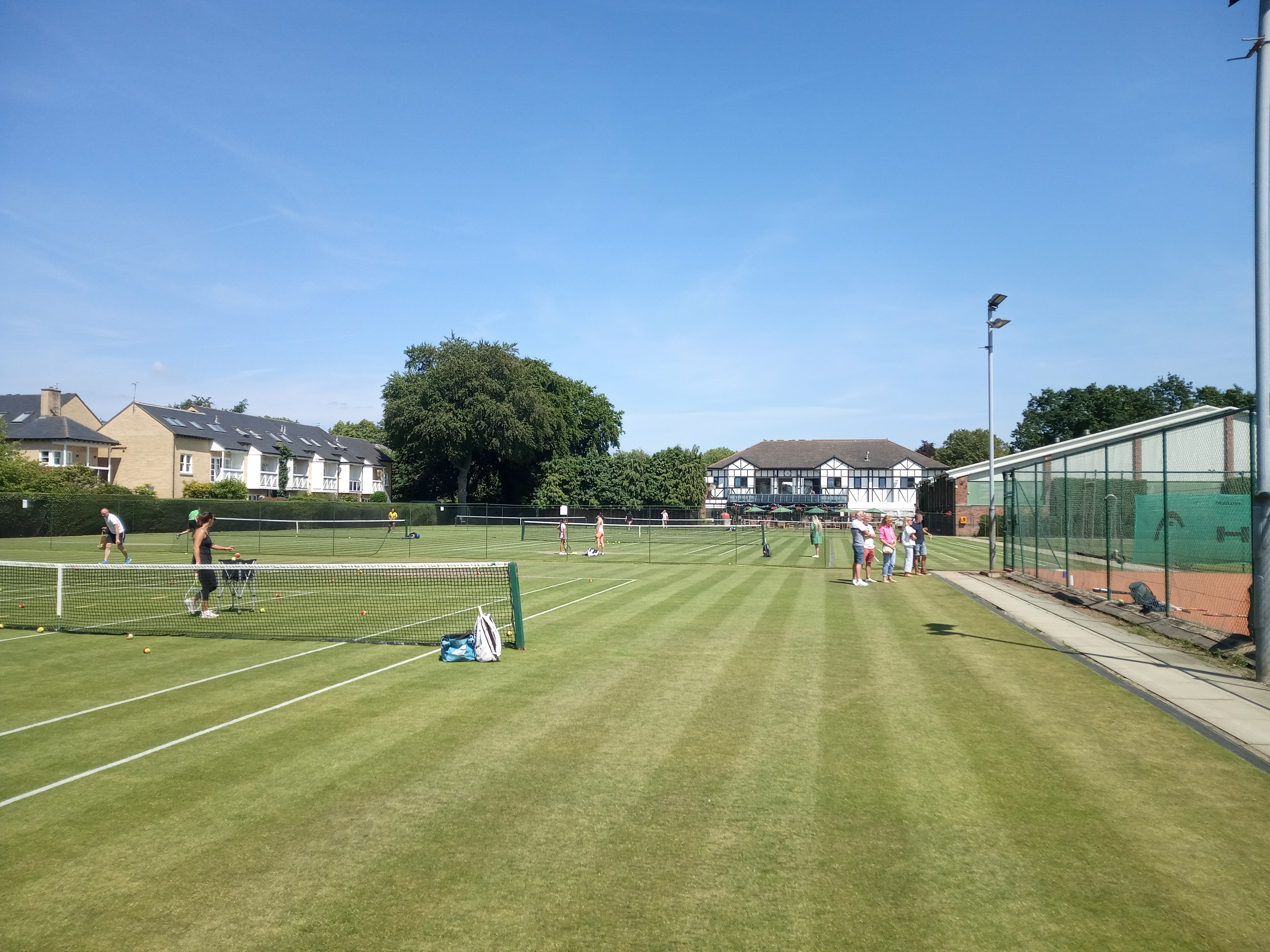
- Formation: 1881
- Type: Private Members Club
- Location: Palatine Road, West Didsbury, Manchester, M20 3YA
- Region served: Manchester
- Official language: English
- Website: Official website

The Northern Lawn Tennis Club, or simply The Northern, is a members-owned sporting club in West Didsbury, Manchester. It was home to the prestigious Northern Championships, considered one of the most important tournaments in the world for many years (the others being Wimbledon, the U.S. National championships and the Irish Championships). It was later the venue for the Manchester Trophy (the successor to that former event), which was played on the International Tennis Federation (ITF) Women's Circuit.

== History ==
The club was established in December 1881 in nearby Old Trafford on grounds leased from the De Trafford Estate. Initial membership was limited to 250 people who had to pay one guinea entrance fee as well as one guinea subscription. In 1909 the club moved to its current location in Didsbury. Over the years the club has hosted many international tournaments including the Manchester Open, which started in 1880 as the Northern Lawn Tennis Championships, and the current Manchester Trophy on the ITF Women's Circuit and formerly part of the ATP Challenger Tour. The club has hosted many players including Ken Rosewall, Maureen Connolly, Pete Sampras and Martina Navratilova.

== Facilities ==
The club is a member of the Lawn Tennis Association and has facilities offering 22 tennis courts: three indoor courts, nine grass courts, three clay courts, six synthetic tiger turf, an indoor half wall and a junior court. In a normal season, outdoor play will commence on the grass courts around the second week in May and finish around the second week of September.

It also has large squash facilities: six courts in total and is an affiliated member of England Squash & Racketball. There is also a gym on site with fitness classes and a bar and restaurant area.

== Notable tournaments ==
=== Current ===
- Northern Clay Court Championships (1997-present)

=== Former ===
- Northern Championships (1881-1979)
- Greater Manchester Grass Court Championships (1980-1989)
- Manchester Open (1990-1994)
- Manchester Trophy Challenger (1995-2015)
- All-England Mixed Doubles Championships (1888-1939)
