= Pietro Pennisi =

Italian tennis player

- Country (sports): Italy
- Born: 11 April 1970 (age 55) Florence, Italy
- Height: 1.73 m (5 ft 8 in)
- Turned pro: 1990
- Plays: Left-handed
- Prize money: $63,092

Singles
- Career record: 1–3
- Highest ranking: No. 217 (16 May 1994)

Grand Slam singles results
- Wimbledon: Q1 (1996)
- US Open: Q2 (1992)

Doubles
- Career record: 3–6
- Highest ranking: No. 238 (20 April 1992)

Pietro Pennisi (born 11 April 1970) is an Italian former professional tennis player. He is now a lawyer.

Born in Florence, Pennisi is the son of Alessandra Gobbò, a tennis player of the 1960s who won a Universiade gold medal for Italy. His brother Lorenzo was also a tennis player.

Pennisi, a left-handed player, was a doubles runner-up at the 1989 Torneo Internazionali Citta di Firenze. His best performance in singles was a second round appearance at the Bologna Outdoor in 1995.

== Grand Prix career finals ==
=== Doubles: 1 (0–1) ===
Result	W/L	Date	Tournament	Surface	Partner	Opponents	Score
Loss	0–1	May 1989	Florence, Italy	Clay	(Italy) Simone Restelli	(United States) Mike De Palmer (United States) Blaine Willenborg	6–4, 4–6, 4–6

== Challenger titles ==
=== Doubles: (2) ===
No.	Year	Tournament	Surface	Partner	Opponents	Score
1.	1994	Bristol, England	Grass	(Germany) Alex Rădulescu	(Italy) Massimo Bertolini (Belgium) Dick Norman	6–4, 7–5
2.	1995	Goa, India	Clay	(Italy) Davide Sanguinetti	(United States) Ivan Baron (Portugal) João Cunha e Silva	7–6, 6–4
