= Manchester Open =

Northern Championships Manchester Open

Defunct tennis tournament
- Tour: ATP Tour, (1968–1974), (1990–1994)
- Founded: 1880
- Abolished: 2009
- Editions: 119
- Location: Manchester, England; Liverpool, England
- Venue: Northern Lawn Tennis Club (Manchester); Aigburth Cricket Ground (Liverpool)
- Surface: Grass / outdoor

The Manchester Open previously known as the Northern Lawn Tennis Championships, the Northern Championships, the Northern Tennis Tournament and the Manchester Trophy was a grass court tennis tournament on the ATP Tour held at the Northern Lawn Tennis Club, in the Didsbury suburb of Manchester, Great Britain. The tournament had been held annually from 1880 to 2009.

Prior to the creation of the International Lawn Tennis Federation and the establishment of its world championship events in 1913 it was considered by players and historians one of the four most important tennis tournaments to win. The others being Wimbledon, the U.S. National championships and the Irish Championships.

== History ==
The first edition in July 1880 was held at the Broughton Cricket Club while the Kersal Cricket Ground staged the 1881 event. The 1882 edition was the first one to be held in Liverpool and saw the addition of the women's singles event, won by May Langrishe, as well as the women's and mixed doubles events. Prior to the creation of the International Lawn Tennis Federation and the establishment of its world championship events in 1913 it was considered by players and historians one of the four most important tennis tournaments to win. the others being Wimbledon, the U.S. National championships and the Irish Championships. From its inception until 1927 the location of the tournament alternated between Manchester and Liverpool. Between 1968 and 1974 it was part of the ATP Tour, from 1976 to 1989 it was played as a non tour event which meant the titles were not recognised by the ATP Tour. It returned to being an ATP Tour event from 1990 to 1994. In 1990 it became an ATP Tour event as part of the ATP International Series until 1994. In 1995 the tournament was moved to Nottingham and continued as an ATP World Series event. The current Manchester Trophy Challenger is part of the ATP Challenger Tour; throughout its history the event has been won by a number of Wimbledon champions such as Pete Sampras, who won his first grass court title there. The tournament ended in 2009.

== Finals ==
=== Men's singles ===
Northern Championships
| Year | Champions | Runners-up | Score |
| 1880 | (British Empire) Richard T. Richardson | (British Empire) Walter E. Fairlie | 6–0, 6–3, 6–0 |
| 1881 | (British Empire) Richard T. Richardson (2) | (British Empire) John Comber | 6–1, 6–1, 6–0 |
| 1882 | (British Empire) Richard T. Richardson (3) | (British Empire) Ernest Renshaw | 6–1, 3–6, 5–7, 6–4, 11–9 |
| 1883 | (British Empire) Herbert Wilberforce | (British Empire) Champion Russell | 6–1, 3–6, 6–1, 6–0 |
| 1884 | (British Empire) Donald C. Stewart | (British Empire) Herbert Wilberforce | 5–7, 6–4, 6–4, 6–0 |
| 1885 | (United States) James Dwight | (British Empire) Donald C. Stewart | 6–2, 6–4, 6–4 |
| 1886 | (British Empire) Harry Grove | (United States) James Dwight | 6–4, 6–3, 6–1 |
| 1887 | (British Empire) Harry Grove (2) | (Ireland) Grainger Chaytor | 4–6, 6–2, 8–10, 6–4, 6–2 |
| 1888 | (Ireland) Willoughby Hamilton | (British Empire) Harry Grove | 6–1, 8–6, 6–1 |
| 1889 | (Ireland) Willoughby Hamilton (2) | (Ireland) Harold Mahony | 6–3, 3–6, 6–1, 6–2 |
| 1890 | (Ireland) Joshua Pim | (Ireland) Willoughby Hamilton | 2–6, 6–8, 7–5, 7–5, 6–3 |
| 1891 | (Ireland) Joshua Pim (2) | (British Empire) Wilfred Baddeley | 4–6, 8–6, 6–4, 7–5 |
| 1892 | (Ireland) Joshua Pim (3) | (British Empire) Harry S. Barlow | 4–6, 6–1, 6–4, 6–4 |
| 1893 | (Ireland) Joshua Pim (4) | (Ireland) Harold Mahony | 4–6, 6–3, 7–5, 6–2 |
| 1894 | (British Empire) Wilfred Baddeley | (Ireland) Joshua Pim | 4–6, 11–9, 4–6, 6–3, 6–4 |
| 1895 | (British Empire) Wilfred Baddeley (2) | (United Kingdom) Herbert Baddeley | 6–8, 6–2, 6–4, 1–0 ret. |
| 1896 | (British Empire) Wilfred Baddeley (3) | (Ireland) Harold Mahony | 6–1, 10–12, 7–5, 6–4 |
| 1897 | (British Empire) Wilfred Baddeley (4) | (British Empire) Reginald Doherty | 6–2, 7–5, 2–6, 6–0 |
| 1898 | (British Empire) Laurence Doherty | (United States) Clarence Hobart | 6–1, 6–1, 8–6 |
| 1899 | (British Empire) Sydney H. Smith | (British Empire) Wilberforce Eaves | 7–9, 6–3, 6–3, 8–6 |
| 1900 | (British Empire) Sydney H. Smith (2) | (British Empire) Roy Allen | 6–3, 6–8, 6–4, 4–6, 6–2 |
| 1901 | (British Empire) Sydney H. Smith (3) | (British Empire) Wilberforce Eaves | 10–12, 7–5, 6–2, 6–4 |
| 1902 | (British Empire) Sydney H. Smith (4) | (Ireland) Harold Mahony | 7–5, 7–5, 3–6, 10–8 |
| 1903 | (British Empire) Sydney H. Smith (5) | (British Empire) Xenophon Casdagli | 6–1, 6–3, 6–2 |
| 1904 | (British Empire) Sydney H. Smith (6) | (British Empire) Frank Riseley | 6–2, 7–9, 2–6, 6–2, 6–2 |
| 1905 | (British Empire) Sydney H. Smith (7) | (British Empire) Frank Riseley | walkover |
| 1906 | (British Empire) Frank Riseley | (British Empire) Sydney H. Smith | 4–6, 7–5, 6–1, 6–3 |
| 1907 | (Australia) Norman Brookes | (British Empire) Xenophon Casdagli | 6–0, 6–2 |
| 1908 | (British Empire) Arthur W. Gore | (Ireland) James Cecil Parke | 6–3, 4–6, 6–1, 6–8, 6–4 |
| 1909 | (Canada) Robert Powell | (British Empire) Theodore Mavrogordato | 6–4, 6–1, 6–4 |
| 1910 | (United States) Beals Wright | (Ireland) James Cecil Parke | divided title |
| 1911 | (Ireland) James Cecil Parke | (New Zealand) Stanley N. Doust | 7–5, 5–7, 6–1, 6–0 |
| 1912 | (Ireland) James Cecil Parke (2) | (British Empire) Theodore Mavrogordato | 6–3, 1–6, 6–3, 6–4 |
| 1913 | (Ireland) James Cecil Parke (3) | (New Zealand) Anthony Wilding | 6–2, 7–5, 6–8, 2–6, 7–5 |
| 1914 | (British Empire) Theodore Mavrogordato | (Australia) Alfred Dunlop | 9–7, 8–6, 6–2 |
| 1915/1918 | Not held (due to world war one) | | |
| 1919 | (Ireland) James Cecil Parke (4) | (South Africa) George Dodd | 0–6, 6–3, 9–7, 6–0 |
| 1920 | (United Kingdom) Theodore Mavrogordato (2) | (United Kingdom) Randolph Lycett | 8–6, 6–2, 5–7, 3–0 ret. |
| 1921 | (United Kingdom) Randolph Lycett | (United Kingdom) Theodore Mavrogordato | 8–6, 2–6, 6–4, 1–6, 6–4 |
| 1922 | (India) Hassan Ali Fyzee | (Republic of Ireland) Louis Meldon | 9–7, 6–4, 11–9 |
| 1923 | (United Kingdom) John D. P. Wheatley | (United Kingdom) Maxwell Woosnam | 6–3, 4–6, 9–7, 9–11, 6-2 |
| 1924 | (United Kingdom) Samuel Ernest Charlton | (Republic of Ireland) William G. Ireland | 10–8, 6–4, 4–6, 7–5 |
| 1925 | (United Kingdom) Norman Dicks | (South Africa) Gerald R. Sherwell | 6–1, 7–5, 2–6, 6–3 |
| 1926 | (United Kingdom) Maxwell Woosnam | (United Kingdom) Douglas Hodges | 7–9, 6–2, 6–2, 8–6 |
| 1927 | (Republic of Ireland) D'Arcy McCrea | (United Kingdom) Douglas Hodges | 4–6, 4–6, 6–2, 6–2, 7-5 |
| 1928 | (United Kingdom) John Olliff | (Republic of Ireland) D'Arcy McCrea | 6–2, 3–6, 6–4, 6–4 |
| 1929 | (United Kingdom) John Olliff (2) | (United Kingdom) Charles Kingsley | 2–6, 6–3, 6–4, 2–6, 14–12 |
| 1930 | (United Kingdom) Bunny Austin | (United Kingdom) John Olliff | 8–6, 6–2, 6–4 |
| 1931 | (United Kingdom) John Olliff (3) | (United Kingdom) Nigel Sharpe | 6–3, 3–6, 7–9, 6–3 ret. |
| 1932 | (New Zealand) Eskell D. Andrews | (United Kingdom) Martin Wedd | 6–2, 6–3 |
| 1933 | (Philippines) Herby Aldred | (United States) J. Gilbert Hall | 3–6, 6–2, 6–1 |
| 1934 | (Republic of Ireland) George Lyttleton–Rogers | (New Zealand) Camille Malfroy | 6–4, 4–6, 6–4 |
| 1935 | (Japan) Jiro Yamagishi | (Republic of Ireland) George Lyttleton–Rogers | 6–3, 8–6 |
| 1936 | (United Kingdom) Charles Hare | (United States) David N. Jones | 6–4, 5–7, 6–4 |
| 1937 | (Republic of Ireland) George Lyttleton–Rogers (2) | (South Africa) Norman Farquharson | 6–4, 2–6, 6–4 |
| 1938 | (United Kingdom) Jack Piercy | (United Kingdom) Clifford J. Hovell | 6–4, 10–8 |
| 1939 | (United Kingdom) Eric J. Filby | (United Kingdom) R. E. Burton | 6–3, 6–4 |
| 1940/1945 | Not held (due to world war two) | | |
| 1946 | (Australia) Jack Harper | (United Kingdom) Derrick Barton | 6–4, 6–1 |
| 1947 | (Australia) William Sidwell | (Sweden) Torsten Johansson | 6–2, 6–3 |
| 1948 | (Australia) John Bromwich | (South Africa) Eric Sturgess | 2–6, 6–2, 8–6 |
| 1949 | (United Kingdom) Tony Mottram | (India) Naresh Kumar | 6–2, 6–2 |
| 1950 | (Australia) Geoffrey Brown | (India) Sumant Misra | 6–0, 6–2 |
| 1951 | (United States) Gardnar Mulloy | (Australia) Don Candy | 6–4, 6–2 |
| 1952 | (Australia) Frank Sedgman | (Australia) Don Candy | 6–2, 4–6, 6–3, 6–2 |
| 1953 | (Australia) Mervyn Rose | (Australia) Clive Wilderspin | 4–6, 6–3, 6–0 |
| 1954 | (Australia) Ken Rosewall | (Australia) Rex Hartwig | 6–2, 6–1 |
| 1955 | (United States) Hugh Stewart | (United Kingdom) Roger Becker | 6–4, 3–6, 6–1 |
| 1956 | (Egypt) Jaroslav Drobný | (Australia) Lew Hoad | 2–6, 6–3, 7–5 |
| 1957 | (Australia) Lew Hoad | (India) Ramanathan Krishnan | 6–2, 6–1 |
| 1958 | (India) Ramanathan Krishnan | (India) Naresh Kumar | 5–7, 6–3, 6-2 |
| 1959 | (Denmark) Kurt Nielsen | (Denmark) Torben Ulrich | 4–6, 6–3, 6–4 |
| 1960 | (New Zealand) Mark Otway | (Australia) Martin Mulligan | 3–6, 6–2, 7–5 |
| 1961 | (United Kingdom) Mike Sangster | (Chile) Luis Ayala | divided |
| 1962 | (United Kingdom) Mike Sangster (2) | (United Kingdom) Billy Knight | 10–12, 6–3, 6–4 |
| 1963 | (United Kingdom) Mike Sangster (3) | (Australia) Tony Roche | 19–17, 6–4 |
| 1964 | abandoned | | |
| 1965 | (Netherlands) Tom Okker | (United Kingdom) Roger Taylor | 7–5, 6–3 |
| 1966 | (United Kingdom) John E. Barrett | (New Zealand) Lew Gerrard | 6–3, 6–3 |
| 1967 | (Australia) Owen Davidson | (Australia) Ray Ruffels | 6–1, 6–8, 6–4 |
↓ Open Era ↓
Rothmans Northern Championships – (ATP Tour Event 1968–1974)
| 1968 | (Australia) Ken Fletcher | (Chile) Luis Ayala | 6–3, 6–2 |
| 1969 | (United States) Clark Graebner | (United Kingdom) Graham Stilwell | 9–7, 3–6, 6–4 |
| 1970 | (United States) Robert Lutz | (United States) Tom Gorman | 6–2, 9–7 |
Bio-Strath Northern Championships
| 1971 | (Australia) Colin Dibley | (South Africa) Bob Hewitt | 6–1, 6–4 |
Rothmans Northern Championships
| 1972 | (Brazil) Thomaz Koch | (Australia) Colin Dibley | 6–2, 5–7, 6–4 |
| 1973 | (United States) Sherwood Stewart | (Australia) Richard Crealy | 6–3, 6-4 |
| 1974 | (United States) Jimmy Connors | (United Kingdom) Mike Collins | 13–11, 6–2 |
| 1975 | Not held | | |
Refuge Assurance Northern Championships – (Non Tour Event 1976–1989)
| 1976 | (United States) Roscoe Tanner | (Australia) Paul McNamee | 6–3, 7–9, 12–10 |
| 1977 | (United States) Billy Martin | (Pakistan) Saeed Meer | 6–2, 6–1 |
| 1978 | (United States) Billy Martin (2) | (United Kingdom) Chris Bradnam | 9–8, 7-5 |
| 1979 | (Australia) Colin Dibley | (United Kingdom) Mark Cox | 6–4, 6–4 |
Greater Manchester Grass Court Tennis Championships
| 1980 | (United States) Roscoe Tanner (2) | (United States) Stan Smith | 6–3, 6–4 |
| 1981 | (Australia) Phil Dent | (Australia) Brad Drewett | 7–5, 6-1 |
| 1982 | (United States) John McEnroe | (New Zealand) Russell Simpson | 6–3, 6–7, 10–8 |
| 1983 | (United States) Tim Mayotte | (United States) Pat DuPré | 3–6, 6–4, 6-4 |
| 1984 | (United Kingdom) Jeremy Bates | (United States) Jeff Turpin | 6–4, 8-6 |
| 1985 | (United Kingdom) Jeremy Bates (2) | (United States) Dan Cassidy | 6–4, 6-2 |
| 1986 | (Canada) Glenn Michibata | | |
| 1987 | (Sweden) Stefan Edberg | (United States) Kevin Curren | 6–3, 6–4 |
| 1988 | (Sweden) Stefan Edberg (2) | (United States) Kevin Curren | 6–3, 6–4 |
| 1989 | (Germany) Patrick Baur | (United Kingdom) Andrew Castle | 6–4, 6–7, 7–5 |
Manchester Open – (ATP Tour Event 1990–1994)
| 1990 | (United States) Pete Sampras | (Israel) Gilad Bloom | 7–6, 7–6 |
| 1991 | (Socialist Federal Republic of Yugoslavia) Goran Ivanišević | (United States) Pete Sampras | 6–4, 6–4 |
| 1992 | (Netherlands) Jacco Eltingh | (United States) MaliVai Washington | 6–3, 6–4 |
| 1993 | (Australia) Jason Stoltenberg | (Australia) Wally Masur | 6–1, 6–3 |
| 1994 | (Australia) Patrick Rafter | (South Africa) Wayne Ferreira | 7–6^{(7–5)}, 7–6^{(7–4)} |
see Manchester Trophy Challenger

=== Men's doubles ===
| Year | Champions | Runners-up | Score |
|---|---|---|---|
| 1990 | (Australia) Mark Kratzmann (Australia) Jason Stoltenberg | (United Kingdom) Nick Brown (United States) Kelly Jones | 6–3, 2–6, 6–4 |
| 1991 | (Italy) Omar Camporese (Croatia) Goran Ivanišević | (United Kingdom) Nick Brown (United Kingdom) Andrew Castle | 6–4, 6–3 |
| 1992 | (United States) Patrick Galbraith (Australia) David Macpherson | (United Kingdom) Jeremy Bates (Australia) Laurie Warder | 4–6, 6–3, 6–2 |
| 1993 | (United States) Ken Flach (United States) Rick Leach | (South Africa) Stefan Kruger (Canada) Glenn Michibata | 6–4, 6–1 |
| 1994 | (United States) Rick Leach (South Africa) Danie Visser | (United States) Scott Davis (United States) Trevor Kronemann | 6–4, 4–6, 7–6 |
see Manchester Trophy Challenger

=== Women's singles ===
Northern Championships
| Year | Champions | Runners-up | Score |
| 1882 | (Ireland) May Langrishe | (England) Constance Langley Smith | 6–3, 8–6 |
| 1883 | (England) Edith Coleridge | (England) Miss Eckersley | 7–5, 6–2 |
| 1884 | (England) Edith Davies | (United Kingdom) Margaret Bracewell | 2–6, 6–4, 6–0 |
| 1885 | (United Kingdom) Maud Watson | (England) Edith Davies | 6–3, 6–3 |
| 1886 | (United Kingdom) Maud Watson (2) | (England) Lottie Dod | 7–5, 6–3 |
| 1887 | (England) Lottie Dod | (United Kingdom) Maud Watson | 6–1, 6–2 |
| 1888 | (England) Lottie Dod (2) | (United Kingdom) Blanche Bingley Hillyard | 6–3, 9–7 |
| 1889 | (England) Lottie Dod (3) | (United Kingdom) Blanche Bingley Hillyard | 6–8, 6–3, 6–3 |
| 1890 | (United Kingdom) Mary Steedman | (United Kingdom) Beatrice Wood | 6–2, 6–0 |
| 1891 | (Ireland) Florence Stanuell | (United Kingdom) Beatrice Wood | 6–3, 2–6, 6–4 |
| 1892 | (England) Lottie Dod (4) | (Ireland) Louisa Martin | 6–1, 6–0 |
| 1893 | (England) Lottie Dod (5) | (United Kingdom) Blanche Bingley Hillyard | 6–3, 3–6, 7–5 |
| 1894 | (United Kingdom) Blanche Bingley Hillyard | (United Kingdom) Beatrice Wood Draffen | 7–5, 5–7, 6–3 |
| 1895 | (Ireland) Louisa Martin | (United Kingdom) Helen Jackson | 7–5, 6–3 |
| 1896 | (Ireland) Louisa Martin (2) | (United Kingdom) Blanche Bingley Hillyard | 6–2, 7–5 |
| 1897 | (United Kingdom) Charlotte Cooper | (Ireland) Louisa Martin | 3–6, 6–3, 6–4 |
| 1898 | (Ireland) Louisa Martin (3) | (United Kingdom) Charlotte Cooper | 10–8, 6–4 |
| 1899 | (Ireland) Louisa Martin (4) | (United Kingdom) Ruth Dyas Durlacher | 6–8, 6–2, 6–2 |
| 1900 | (United Kingdom) Blanche Bingley Hillyard (2) | (Ireland) Louisa Martin | 2–6, 8–6, 6–4 |
| 1901 | (Ireland) Louisa Martin (5) | (United Kingdom) Blanche Bingley Hillyard | 6–3, 4–6, 6–3 |
| 1902 | (Ireland) Louisa Martin (6) | (United Kingdom) Muriel Robb | 6–8, 7–5, 6–1 |
| 1903 | (Ireland) Louisa Martin (7) | (United Kingdom) Dorothea Douglass | 4–6, 7–5, 6–4 |
| 1904 | (United Kingdom) Dorothea Douglass | (United Kingdom) Ethel Thomson | 6–1, 6–2 |
| 1905 | (United States) May Sutton | (United Kingdom) Hilda Lane | 7–5, 8–6 |
| 1906 | (United Kingdom) Dorothea Douglass (2) | (United States) May Sutton | 7–5, 6–2 |
| 1907 | (United Kingdom) Charlotte Cooper Sterry (2) | (United States) May Sutton | 7–5, 6–0 |
| 1908 | (United Kingdom) Edith Boucher | (United Kingdom) Charlotte Cooper Sterry | 7–5, 6–2 |
| 1909 | (United Kingdom) Edith Johnson | (United Kingdom) Maude Garfit | 6–3, 9–11, 6–0 |
| 1910 | (United Kingdom) Edith Johnson (2) | (United Kingdom) Maude Garfit | 3–6, 6–4, 6–0 |
| 1911 | (United Kingdom) Dorothea Douglass Chambers (3) | (United Kingdom) Mabel Squire Parton | 6–2, 6–2 |
| 1912 | (United Kingdom) Ethel Thomson Larcombe | (United Kingdom) Mabel Squire Parton | 6–4, 6–1 |
| 1913 | (United Kingdom) Ethel Thomson Larcombe (2) | (United Kingdom) Dorothea Douglass Chambers | 6–2m 6–4 |
| 1914 | (United Kingdom) Dorothea Douglass Chambers (4) | (United Kingdom) Agnes Morton | 6–1, 6–2 |
| 1915/1918 | Not held (due to world war one) | | |
| 1919 | (United Kingdom) Dorothea Douglass Chambers (5) | (United Kingdom) Ethel Thomson Larcombe | 7–5 6–3 |
| 1920 | (United States) Elizabeth Ryan | (United Kingdom) Aurea Farrington Edgington | 6–1, 6–3 |
| 1921 | (United States) Elizabeth Ryan (2) | (United Kingdom) Kitty Mckane | 7–5, 6–4 |
| 1922 | (United States) Elizabeth Ryan (3) | (United Kingdom) Kitty Mckane | 6–2, 8–6 |
| 1923 | (United States) Elizabeth Ryan (4) | (United Kingdom) Dorothy Holman | 6–3, 6–3 |
| 1924 | (United Kingdom) Mary Holmes | (United Kingdom) Claire Beckingham | 6–0, 0–6, 6–3 |
| 1925 | (United States) Elizabeth Ryan (5) | (United Kingdom) Joan Reid-Thomas | 6–4, 6–3 |
| 1926 | (United Kingdom) Claire Beckingham | (United Kingdom) Elsie Goldsack | 6–1, 6–1 |
| 1927 | (United Kingdom) Claire Beckingham (2) | (United Kingdom) Elsie Goldsack | 6–2, 8–6 |
| 1928 | (United Kingdom) Claire Beckingham (3) | (United Kingdom) Dorothy Shaw | 8–6, 6–3 |
| 1928 | (United Kingdom) Gwen Sterry | (United Kingdom) Sylvia Lumley-Ellis | 6–4, 6–2 |
| | From 1929–1939 there were 2 women's events held in * Manchester & ** Liverpool | | |
| 1929* | (United Kingdom) Joan Fry | (United Kingdom) Gwen Sterry | 6–1, 4–6, 6–4 |
| 1929** | (United Kingdom) Winifred Bower | (United Kingdom) Joan Reid-Thomas Strawson | 6–1, 3–6, 6–1 |
| 1930* | (United Kingdom) Evelyn Goldsworth | (United Kingdom) Nichola Hunt | 7–5, 6–2 |
| 1930** | (United Kingdom) Joan Reid-Thomas Strawson | (United Kingdom) Dorothy Anderson | 4–6, 6–4, 6–4 |
| 1931* | (United Kingdom) Evelyn Goldsworth (2) | (Egypt) Ena Alexandroff | 8–10 6–4 6–3 |
| 1931** | (Egypt) Ena Alexandroff | (United Kingdom) Joan Ingram | divided title |
| 1932* | (United Kingdom) Joan Ingram | (United Kingdom) Manon Hargreaves | 11-9, 6–1 |
| 1932** | (United Kingdom) Christabel Hardie Wheatcroft | (United Kingdom) Sarah Eccles | 6–3, 6–3 |
| 1933 | Liverpool event not held | | |
| 1933* | (United Kingdom) Evelyn Goldsworth (3) | (United Kingdom) Jackie McAlpine | 7–5 6–1 |
| 1934* | (United Kingdom) Jean Saunders | (United Kingdom) Doris Bullock | 6–0, 6–2 |
| 1934** | (Denmark) Hilde Krahwinkel Sperling | (Australia) Joan Hartigan | 7–5, 8–6 |
| 1935* | (United Kingdom) Mary Hardwick | (United Kingdom) Dora Beazley | 6–0, 6–2 |
| 1935** | (United Kingdom) Mary Whitmarsh | (United Kingdom) Barbara Drew | 9–11, 6–4, 6–2 |
| 1936* | (United Kingdom) Patience Thomson | (United Kingdom) Dora Beazley | 6–0, 6–2 |
| 1936** | (Chile) Anita Lizana | (United Kingdom) Nancy Kidson Fontes | 6–1, 6–0 |
| 1937* | (United Kingdom) Dora Beazley | (United Kingdom) Pamela Morison | 2–6, 6–2, 7–5 |
| 1937** | (Chile) Anita Lizana (2) | (United Kingdom) Joan Reid-Thomas Strawson | 6–0, 6–4 |
| 1938* | (United Kingdom) Peggy Saunders Michell | (United Kingdom) Dora Beazley | 6–1, 5–7, 7–5 |
| 1938** | (Denmark) Hilde Krahwinkel Sperling (2) | (United Kingdom) Joan Reid-Thomas Strawson | 6–0, 6–4 |
| 1939 | Liverpool event not held | | |
| 1939* | (United Kingdom) Gem Hoahing | (United Kingdom) Patience Thomson | divided title |
| 1940/1945 | Not held (due to world war two) | | |
| 1946 | (United States) Margaret Osborne | (United States) Louise Brough | 6–1, 6–3 |
| 1947 | (United Kingdom) Jean Nicoll Bostock | (United Kingdom) Betty Hilton | 11-9, 6–2 |
| 1948 | (United Kingdom) Betty Hilton | (United Kingdom) Jean Nicoll Bostock | 6–3, 8–6 |
| 1949 | (United States) Pat Canning Todd | (United Kingdom) Lesley Hunter Fulton | 6–3 6–2 |
| 1950 | (United States) Shirley Fry | (United Kingdom) Gladys Southwell Lines | 6–2, 6–3 |
| 1951 | (United States) Doris Hart | (United States) Beverly Baker | 8–6, 6–3 |
| 1952 | (United States) Maureen Connolly | (United Kingdom) Jean Quertier Rinkel | 6–3, 6–1 |
| 1953 | (United States) Doris Hart (2) | (United Kingdom) Helen Fletcher | 5–7, 6–1, 7–5 |
| 1954 | (United States) Maureen Connolly (2) | (United States) Louise Brough | 6–3, 6–2 |
| 1955 | (United States) Doris Hart (3) | (United States) Louise Brough | 9–11, 6–2, 6–2 |
| 1956 | (United States) Althea Gibson | (United States) Louise Brough | 2–6, 6–4, 6–4 |
| 1957 | (United States) Althea Gibson (2) | (United Kingdom) Anne Shilcock | 6–3, 6–4 |
| 1958 | (United States) Althea Gibson (3) | (Brazil) Maria Bueno | 6–1, 8–6 |
| 1959 | (United States) Sally Moore | (Mexico) Rosie Reyes | 6–2, 2–6, 6–3 |
| 1960 | (United States) Darlene Hard | (United Kingdom) Rita Bentley | 6–3 6–3 |
| 1961 | (South Africa) Sandra Reynolds | (Australia) Lesley Turner | 6–4 6–3 |
| 1962 | (United States) Darlene Hard (2) | (Australia) Judy Tegart | 6–3, 6–2 |
| 1963 | (Australia) Jan Lehane | (United States) Darlene Hard | 6–4, 8–10, 6–4 |
| 1964 | abandoned at semifinal stage due to rain | | |
| 1965 | (Australia) Margaret Smith | (Brazil) Maria Bueno | 6–1, 7–5 |
| 1966 | (United States) Billie Jean King | (United Kingdom) Winnie Shaw | 6–2, 6–1 |
| 1967 | (Brazil) Maria Bueno | (Australia) Karen Krantzcke | 6–4, 6–3 |
↓ Open Era ↓
