= Massimiliano Narducci =

Italian tennis player

- Country (sports): Italy
- Born: 25 February 1964 (age 61); Ascoli Piceno, Italy
- Height: 1.85 m (6 ft 1 in)
- Plays: Right-handed
- Prize money: $105,308

Singles
- Career record: 18–27
- Career titles: 1
- Highest ranking: No. 77 (23 May 1988)

Grand Slam singles results
- Australian Open: 2R (1988)
- French Open: 2R (1988)
- Wimbledon: 1R (1988)
- US Open: 1R (1988)

Doubles
- Career record: 9–11

Massimiliano Narducci (born 25 February 1964) is a former professional tennis player from Italy.

Narducci won his only tournament on the ATP Tour in 1988 at Florence. He also appeared in the singles draw of all four Grand Slams, making the second round in both Australia and France. In the Australian Open he defeated American player Mike Bauer in five sets. He met fifth seed Yannick Noah in the next round and took the first set off him, in a tiebreak, but then lost the next three sets. At the French Open he eliminated Joey Rive in the opening round, before losing to Andre Agassi.

In 1989 he put in some good doubles performances with his partner Omar Camporese. They reached the quarter-finals at Monte Carlo and the semi-finals in Milan. That year, Narducci also played two Davis Cup singles matches for the Italian team against Sweden. He lost both, in five setters, to Jonas Svensson / Mikael Pernfors.

== Grand Prix career finals ==
=== Singles: 1 (1–0) ===
Result	W/L	Date	Tournament	Surface	Opponent	Score
Win	1–0	May 1988	Florence, Italy	Clay	(Italy) Claudio Panatta	3–6, 6–1, 6–4
