= Nick Brown (tennis) =

British tennis player and coach

- Country (sports): (United Kingdom) Great Britain
- Residence: Hanwell, London, England
- Born: 3 September 1961 (age 63); Warrington, Cheshire, England
- Height: 1.90 m (6 ft 3 in)
- Plays: Right-handed

Singles
- Career record: 10–16
- Career titles: 0
- Highest ranking: No. 145 (25 September 1989)

Grand Slam singles results
- Australian Open: 1R (1990)
- Wimbledon: 3R (1991)

Doubles
- Career record: 38–44
- Career titles: 0
- Highest ranking: No. 42 (23 September 1991)

Grand Slam doubles results
- Australian Open: QF (1991)
- French Open: 2R (1990, 1991)
- Wimbledon: 3R (1991)
- US Open: 2R (1991)

Nick Brown (born 3 September 1961) is a tennis coach and former professional tennis player from the United Kingdom.

Brown won the British Under-21 championship in 1980 and the national senior singles championship three years later in 1983. After playing on the ATP tour in the early 1980s, but tiring of his financial situation, he left the tour in 1984 to devote his time to coaching in Belgium and France and then young British players at David Lloyd's club in London, including Tim Henman. Five years later, Brown came out of retirement to play in the Davis Cup.

Brown caused a sensation at Wimbledon in 1991 when he was granted a wild card. Ranked No. 591 in the world at the time, he faced the 10th seed and previous year's semi-finalist Goran Ivanišević in the second round and defeated him in four sets. Brown became the first Briton to defeat a seeded player at Wimbledon since John Lloyd beat Eliot Teltscher in 1985. Brown eventually lost in the third round to France's Thierry Champion.

Brown's career-high rankings were world No. 120 in singles and No. 25 in doubles.

Since permanently retiring from competitive tennis, Brown has served as coach of Britain's Fed Cup team. (1999–2005). He has coached several international players including Tim Henman, Łukasz Kubot and Iga Świątek.

In 2010, Brown was the Polish Davis Cup and Olympic tennis coach.

== Personal life ==
Brown is married to Nadia Macari-Brown.

== Career finals ==
=== Singles (1) ===
Result	W/L	Date	Tournament	Surface	Opponent	Score
Loss	0–1	Jun 1989	Bristol, UK	Grass	(West Germany) Eric Jelen	4–6, 6–3, 5–7

=== Doubles (3) ===
Result	W/L	Date	Tournament	Surface	Partner	Opponents	Score
Loss	0–1	Jun 1990	Manchester, UK	Grass	(United States) Kelly Jones	(Australia) Mark Kratzmann (Australia) Jason Stoltenberg	3–6, 6–2, 4–6
Loss	0–2	Feb 1991	Stuttgart, Germany	Carpet (i)	(United Kingdom) Jeremy Bates	(Spain) Sergio Casal (Spain) Emilio Sánchez	3–6, 5–7
Loss	0–3	Jun 1991	Manchester, UK	Grass	(United Kingdom) Andrew Castle	(Italy) Omar Camporese (Croatia) Goran Ivanišević	4–6, 3–6
