= ATP Florence =

Defunct men's tennis tournament in Italy

UniCredit Firenze Open

Defunct tennis tournament
- Event name: Various
- Tour: Spring Mediterranean circuit (1973); Grand Prix circuit (1974, 1978–1989); ATP Tour (1990–94); ATP Tour 250 (2022)
- Founded: 1973
- Abolished: 2022
- Editions: 48
- Location: Florence, Italy
- Surface: Hard (i)

The Florence Open is a defunct men's tennis tournament founded also known as the International City of Florence Tournament or Torneo Internazionali Citta di Firenze. It was part of the Rothman's Spring Mediterranean circuit in 1973, the Grand Prix tennis circuit from 1974 and from 1978 until 1989 and the ATP Tour from 1990 until 1994. The tournament was held in Florence, Italy and was played on outdoor clay courts. From 1973 until 1989, it was played in the weeks preceding the French Open; however, from 1990, it was played the week immediately after.

Italian Paolo Bertolucci won the event a record three consecutive times from 1975 through 1977, with clay court specialist Thomas Muster repeating the feat from 1991 through 1993.

The event was resumed in October 2022 as an ATP Tour 250 event with a single-year license due to the cancellation of tournaments in China because of the ongoing COVID-19 pandemic.

== Results ==
=== Singles ===
Year	Tournament name	Champions	Runners-up	Score
1973	Dunhill Florence	(Romania) Ilie Năstase	(Italy) Adriano Panatta	6–3, 3–6, 0–6, 7–6, 6–4
1974	Trofeo VAT 69	(Italy) Adriano Panatta	(Italy) Paolo Bertolucci	6–3, 6–1
1975		(Italy) Paolo Bertolucci	(France) Georges Goven	6–3, 6–2
1976	Torneo Internazionale	(Italy) Paolo Bertolucci	(France) Patrick Proisy	6–7, 2–6, 6–3, 6–2, 10–8
1977	Florence International	(Italy) Paolo Bertolucci	(United Kingdom) John Feaver	6–4, 6–1, 7–5
1978	Alitalia Florence Open	(Argentina) José Luis Clerc	(France) Patrice Dominguez	6–4, 6–2, 6–1
1979	Alitalia Firenze	(Mexico) Raúl Ramírez	(West Germany) Karl Meiler	6–4, 1–6, 3–6, 7–5, 6–0
1980	Alitalia Open	(Italy) Adriano Panatta	(Mexico) Raúl Ramírez	6–2, 2–6, 6–4
1981	Alitalia Open	(Argentina) José Luis Clerc	(Mexico) Raúl Ramírez	6–1, 6–2
1982	Florence Open	(United States) Vitas Gerulaitis	(Sweden) Stefan Simonsson	4–6, 6–3, 6–1
1983	Roger Gallet Cup	(United States) Jimmy Arias	(Italy) Francesco Cancellotti	6–1, 6–4
1984	Roger et Gallet Cup	(Italy) Francesco Cancellotti	(United States) Jimmy Brown	6–3, 6–3
1985	Torneo Internazionale Roger et Gallet	(Spain) Sergio Casal	(United States) Jimmy Arias	3–6, 6–3, 6–2
1986	Torneo Internazionale Città di Firenze	(Ecuador) Andrés Gómez	(Sweden) Henrik Sundström	6–3, 6–4
1987	Torneo Internazionale Città di Firenze	(Soviet Union) Andrei Chesnokov	(Italy) Alessandro de Minicis	6–1, 6–3
1988	Torneo Internazionale Città di Firenze	(Italy) Massimiliano Narducci	(Italy) Claudio Panatta	3–6, 6–1, 6–4
1989	Torneo Internazionale Città di Firenze	(Argentina) Horacio de la Peña	(Socialist Federal Republic of Yugoslavia) Goran Ivanišević	6–4, 6–3
1990	Torneo Internazionale Città di Firenze	(Sweden) Magnus Larsson	(United States) Lawson Duncan	6–7, 7–5, 6–0
1991	Torneo Internazionale Città di Firenze	(Austria) Thomas Muster	(Austria) Horst Skoff	6–2, 6–7, 6–2
1992	Trofeo Kim Top Line	(Austria) Thomas Muster	(Italy) Renzo Furlan	6–3, 1–6, 6–1
1993	Trofeo Kim Top Line	(Austria) Thomas Muster	(Spain) Jordi Burillo	6–1, 7–5
1994	Torneo Internazionali "Citta' di Firenze"	(Uruguay) Marcelo Filippini	(Australia) Richard Fromberg	3–6, 6–3, 6–3
1995–2021	Not held			
2022	UniCredit Firenze Open	(Canada) Félix Auger-Aliassime	(United States) J. J. Wolf	6–4, 6–4

=== Doubles ===
Year	Champions	Runners-up	Score
1973	(Italy) Paolo Bertolucci (Italy) Adriano Panatta	(Spain) Juan Gisbert (Romania) Ilie Năstase	6–3, 6–4
1974	(Italy) Paolo Bertolucci (Italy) Adriano Panatta	(Hungary) Róbert Machán (Hungary) Balázs Taróczy	6–3, 3–6, 6–4
1975	Not held		
1976	(Australia) Colin Dibley (Brazil) Carlos Kirmayr	(Hungary) Péter Szőke (Hungary) Balázs Taróczy	5–7, 7–5, 7–5
1977	(New Zealand) Chris Lewis (New Zealand) Russell Simpson	(Colombia) Iván Molina (Colombia) Jairo Velasco Sr.	2–6, 7–6, 6–2
1978	(Italy) Corrado Barazzutti (Italy) Adriano Panatta	(Australia) Mark Edmondson (Australia) John Marks	6–3, 6–7, 6–3
1979	(Italy) Paolo Bertolucci (Italy) Adriano Panatta	(Czechoslovakia) Ivan Lendl (Czechoslovakia) Pavel Složil	6–4, 6–3
1980	(United States) Gene Mayer (Mexico) Raúl Ramírez	(Italy) Paolo Bertolucci (Italy) Adriano Panatta	6–1, 6–4
1981	(Mexico) Raúl Ramírez (Czechoslovakia) Pavel Složil	(Italy) Paolo Bertolucci (Italy) Adriano Panatta	6–3, 3–6, 6–3
1982	(Italy) Paolo Bertolucci (Italy) Adriano Panatta	(United States) Sammy Giammalva Jr. (United States) Tony Giammalva	7–6, 6–1
1983	(Paraguay) Francisco González (Paraguay) Víctor Pecci	(France) Dominique Bedel (France) Bernard Fritz	4–6, 6–4, 7–6
1984	(United States) Mark Dickson (United States) Chip Hooper	(South Africa) Bernard Mitton (United States) Butch Walts	7–6, 4–6, 7–5
1985	(Australia) David Graham (Australia) Laurie Warder	(New Zealand) Bruce Derlin (Australia) Carl Limberger	6–1, 6–1
1986	(Spain) Sergio Casal (Spain) Emilio Sánchez	(United States) Mike De Palmer (United States) Gary Donnelly	6–4, 7–6
1987	(West Germany) Wolfgang Popp (West Germany) Udo Riglewski	(Italy) Paolo Canè (Italy) Gianni Ocleppo	6–4, 6–4
1988	(Argentina) Javier Frana (Argentina) Christian Miniussi	(Italy) Claudio Pistolesi (Austria) Horst Skoff	7–6, 6–4
1989	(United States) Mike De Palmer (United States) Blaine Willenborg	(Italy) Pietro Pennisi (Italy) Simone Restelli	4–6, 6–4, 6–4
1990	(Spain) Sergi Bruguera (Argentina) Horacio de la Peña	(Brazil) Luiz Mattar (Uruguay) Diego Pérez	3–6, 6–3, 6–4
1991	(Sweden) Ola Jonsson (Sweden) Magnus Larsson	(Spain) Juan Carlos Báguena (Spain) Carlos Costa	3–6, 6–1, 6–4
1992	(Uruguay) Marcelo Filippini (Brazil) Luiz Mattar	(South Africa) Royce Deppe (South Africa) Brent Haygarth	6–4, 6–7, 6–4
1993	(Spain) Tomás Carbonell (Belgium) Libor Pimek	(Netherlands) Mark Koevermans (United States) Greg Van Emburgh	7–6, 2–6, 6–1
1994	(Australia) Jon Ireland (United States) Kenny Thorne	(United Kingdom) Neil Broad (United States) Greg Van Emburgh	7–6, 6–3
1995–2021	Not held		
2022	(France) Édouard Roger-Vasselin (France) Nicolas Mahut	(Croatia) Ivan Dodig (United States) Austin Krajicek	7–6^{(7–4)}, 6–4
