= Omar Camporese =

Italian tennis player

- Country (sports): Italy
- Residence: Monte Carlo, Monaco
- Born: 8 May 1968 (age 58) Bologna, Italy
- Height: 1.88 m (6 ft 2 in)
- Turned pro: 1987
- Retired: 1998
- Plays: Right-handed (one-handed backhand)
- Prize money: $1,610,475

Singles
- Career record: 150–157
- Career titles: 2
- Highest ranking: No. 18 (10 February 1992)

Grand Slam singles results
- Australian Open: 4R (1992)
- French Open: 3R (1989, 1991)
- Wimbledon: 3R (1991)
- US Open: 3R (1992)

Other tournaments
- Olympic Games: 2R (1992)

Doubles
- Career record: 109–114
- Career titles: 5
- Highest ranking: No. 27 (13 January 1992)

Omar Camporese (Italian pronunciation: [ˈɔːmar kampoˈreːze]; born 8 May 1968) is a former professional tennis player from Italy.

== Career ==
Born in Bologna, Camporese turned professional in 1987. He reached his first top-level singles final in 1990 at San Marino, where he lost to Guillermo Pérez Roldán 6–3, 6–3.

In 1991, Camporese won his first tour singles title in Rotterdam, defeating Ivan Lendl in the final 3–6, 7–6, 7–6. At the Australian Open the same year he lost against Boris Becker in a 311 minutes long match. Becker won 7–6, 7–6, 0–6, 4–6, 14–12 which is the fourth longest match in the tournament's history. 1992 saw Camporese win his second tour singles title at Milan, where he beat Goran Ivanišević in the final 3–6, 6–3, 6–4.

Camporese's best performance at a Grand Slam event came at the 1992 Australian Open, where he reached the fourth round before being knocked out by Lendl.

During his career, Camporese won two top-level singles titles and five tour doubles titles. His career high rankings were World No. 18 in singles and World No. 27 in doubles (both in 1992). His career prize-money totalled $1,609,837. Camporese retired from the professional tour in 1998.

== Career finals ==
=== Singles (2 wins, 1 loss) ===
Legend
Grand Slam (0–0)
Tennis Masters Cup (0–0)
ATP Masters Series (0–0)
ATP Tour (2–1)

Result	W/L	Date	Tournament	Surface	Opponent	Score
Loss	0–1	Aug 1990	San Marino, San Marino	Clay	(Argentina) Guillermo Pérez Roldán	3–6, 3–6
Win	1–1	Feb 1991	Rotterdam, Netherlands	Carpet (i)	(Czechoslovakia) Ivan Lendl	3–6, 7–6^{(7–4)}, 7–6^{(7–4)}
Win	2–1	Feb 1992	Milan, Italy	Carpet (i)	(Croatia) Goran Ivanišević	3–6, 6–3, 6–4

=== Doubles (5 wins, 4 losses) ===
Result	W/L	Date	Tournament	Surface	Partner	Opponents	Score
Loss	0–1	Oct 1989	Basel, Switzerland	Carpet	(Switzerland) Claudio Mezzadri	(West Germany) Udo Riglewski (West Germany) Michael Stich	3–6, 6–4, 0–6
Win	1–1	Feb 1990	Milan, Italy	Carpet (i)	(Italy) Diego Nargiso	(Netherlands) Tom Nijssen (West Germany) Udo Riglewski	6–4, 6–4
Loss	1–2.	Apr 1990	Estoril, Portugal	Clay	(Italy) Paolo Canè	(Spain) Sergio Casal (Spain) Emilio Sánchez	5–7, 6–4, 5–7
Win	2–2	Apr 1990	Madrid, Spain	Clay	(Spain) Juan Carlos Báguena	(Ecuador) Andrés Gómez (Spain) Javier Sánchez	6–4, 3–6, 6–3
Loss	2–3	Jul 1990	Gstaad, Switzerland	Clay	(Spain) Javier Sánchez	(Spain) Sergio Casal (Spain) Emilio Sánchez	3–6, 6–3, 5–7
Win	3–3	Feb 1991	Milan, Italy	Carpet (i)	(Socialist Federal Republic of Yugoslavia) Goran Ivanišević	(Netherlands) Tom Nijssen (Czechoslovakia) Cyril Suk	6–4, 7–6
Win	4–3	May 1991	Rome, Italy	Clay	(Socialist Federal Republic of Yugoslavia) Goran Ivanišević	(United States) Luke Jensen (Australia) Laurie Warder	6–2, 6–3
Win	5–3	Jun 1991	Manchester, UK	Grass	(Socialist Federal Republic of Yugoslavia) Goran Ivanišević	(United Kingdom) Nick Brown (United Kingdom) Andrew Castle	6–4, 6–3
Loss	5–4	Jul 1991	Stuttgart, Germany	Clay	(Socialist Federal Republic of Yugoslavia) Goran Ivanišević	(Australia) Wally Masur (Spain) Emilio Sánchez	6–4, 3–6, 4–6
