= 1991 Australian Open – Men's singles qualifying =

Men's singles qualifying
- 1991 Australian Open

Events
Singles	men	women		boys	girls
Doubles	men	women	mixed	boys	girls
WC Singles	men	women	quad
WC Doubles	men	women	quad
Legends	men	women	mixed

Qualification
Singles	men	women
- Australian Open

This article displays the qualifying draw for men's singles at the 1991 Australian Open.

== Seeds ==
1. (Uruguay) Diego Perez (qualifying competition, lucky loser)
2. (United States) Kelly Jones (qualified)
3. (United States) Glenn Layendecker (qualifying competition, lucky loser)
4. (Netherlands) Jan Siemerink (qualified)
5. (United States) Chris Garner (second round)
6. (Belgium) Bart Wuyts (qualified)
7. (Czechoslovakia) Ctislav Doseděl (qualified)
8. (Germany) Christian Saceanu (qualified)
9. (Socialist Federal Republic of Yugoslavia) Bruno Orešar (second round)
10. (Soviet Union) Dimitri Poliakov (qualified)
11. (Germany) Markus Zoecke (qualified)
12. (Argentina) Christian Miniussi (second round)
13. (Netherlands) Michiel Schapers (qualifying competition, lucky loser)
14. (South Africa) Wayne Ferreira (qualified)
15. (France) Arnaud Boetsch (qualifying competition)
16. (South Africa) Mark Kaplan (qualified)
17. (United States) Tommy Ho (first round)
18. (Mexico) Leonardo Lavalle (qualified)
19. (Argentina) Javier Frana (qualified)
20. (Italy) Gianluca Pozzi (second round)
21. (Nigeria) Nduka Odizor (first round)
22. (Australia) Neil Borwick (first round)
23. (United States) Jonathan Canter (qualified)
24. (South Africa) Pieter Aldrich (qualifying competition)
25. (Netherlands) Tom Nijssen (qualifying competition)
26. (South Africa) Danie Visser (first round)
27. (Venezuela) Maurice Ruah (second round)
28. (Netherlands) Menno Oosting (second round)
29. (United States) Tim Wilkison (first round)
30. (New Zealand) Brett Steven (first round)
31. (United Kingdom) Nick Brown (first round)
32. (United States) Richard Matuszewski (first round)

== Qualifiers ==
1. (Sweden) Lars-Anders Wahlgren
2. (United States) Kelly Jones
3. (Australia) John Arbanas
4. (Netherlands) Jan Siemerink
5. (Czechoslovakia) Daniel Vacek
6. (Belgium) Bart Wuyts
7. (Czechoslovakia) Ctislav Doseděl
8. (Germany) Christian Saceanu
9. (United States) Jonathan Canter
10. (Soviet Union) Dimitri Poliakov
11. (Germany) Markus Zoecke
12. (United Kingdom) Andrew Castle
13. (Argentina) Javier Frana
14. (South Africa) Wayne Ferreira
15. (Mexico) Leonardo Lavalle
16. (South Africa) Mark Kaplan

== Lucky losers ==
1. (Uruguay) Diego Perez
2. (Netherlands) Michiel Schapers
3. (United States) Glenn Layendecker

== Qualifying draw ==
Key

- Q = Qualifier
- WC = Wild card
- LL = Lucky loser
- Alt = Alternate
- ITF = ITF entry
- PR = Protected ranking
- SR = Special ranking
- SE = Special exempt
- JE = Junior exempt
- JR = Junior Accelerator Programme entrant
- CO = College Accelerator Programme entrant
- NG = Next Gen Accelerator Program entrant
- w/o = Walkover
- r = Retired
- d = Defaulted

=== First qualifier ===
First round
(United States) Craig Boynton	5	2
(Philippines) Felix Barrientos	7	6
(Australia) Brett Custer	7	6
(New Zealand) David Lewis	5	2
(Sweden) Lars-Anders Wahlgren	6	6
32	(United States) Richard Matuszewski	3	2

Second round
1	(Uruguay) Diego Perez	7	3	6
(Philippines) Felix Barrientos	6	6	4
(Australia) Brett Custer	5	1
(Sweden) Lars-Anders Wahlgren	7	6

Qualifying competition
1	(Uruguay) Diego Perez	3	2
(Sweden) Lars-Anders Wahlgren	6	6

=== Second qualifier ===
First round
(Australia) Pat Rafter	2	5
(United Kingdom) Neil Broad	6	7
(Australia) Bret Richardson	6	3	2
(South Africa) Stefan Kruger	3	6	6
(Australia) Andrew McLean	7	0	6
31	(United Kingdom) Nick Brown	5	6	2

Second round
2	(United States) Kelly Jones	6	3	6
(United Kingdom) Neil Broad	3	6	4
(South Africa) Stefan Kruger	2	5
(Australia) Andrew McLean	6	7

Qualifying competition
2	(United States) Kelly Jones	6	4	6
(Australia) Andrew McLean	3	6	2

=== Third qualifier ===
First round
(Australia) Gavin Pfitzner	3	2
(South Africa) Michael Robertson	6	6
(Australia) Mark Hopkins	6	6
WC	(Australia) Leigh Holland	4	2
(Australia) John Arbanas	6	6
29	(United States) Tim Wilkison	3	4

Second round
3	(United States) Glenn Layendecker	6	7
(South Africa) Michael Robertson	3	6
(Australia) Mark Hopkins	6	2	4
(Australia) John Arbanas	4	6	6

Qualifying competition
3	(United States) Glenn Layendecker	4	3
(Australia) John Arbanas	6	6

=== Fourth qualifier ===
First round
(Australia) Michael Brown	1	2
(United States) Greg Failla	6	6
WC	(Australia) Iggy Damiani	2	3
(United States) Craig Johnson	6	6
(Sweden) Thomas Enqvist	2	6	6
30	(New Zealand) Brett Steven	6	3	3

Second round
4	(Netherlands) Jan Siemerink	4	6	6
(United States) Greg Failla	6	1	4
(United States) Craig Johnson	6	6
(Sweden) Thomas Enqvist	3	2

Qualifying competition
4	(Netherlands) Jan Siemerink	6	7
(United States) Craig Johnson	2	6

=== Fifth qualifier ===
First round
(Australia) Joshua Eagle	2	2
(Czechoslovakia) Daniel Vacek	6	6
(Belgium) Xavier Daufresne	6	6
(Australia) Glen Eaton	3	4
(Germany) Stefan Heckmanns	5	6^{7}
28	(Netherlands) Menno Oosting	7	7^{9}

Second round
5	(United States) Chris Garner	5	1
(Czechoslovakia) Daniel Vacek	7	6
(Belgium) Xavier Daufresne	7	7
28	(Netherlands) Menno Oosting	5	5

Qualifying competition
(Czechoslovakia) Daniel Vacek	6	6	6
(Belgium) Xavier Daufresne	4	7	1

=== Sixth qualifier ===
First round
WC	(Australia) Clinton Snell	4	2
(Socialist Federal Republic of Yugoslavia) Slobodan Živojinović	6	6
(The Bahamas) Roger Smith	6	6
(United Kingdom) Paul C. Robinson	4	1
(Australia) Stephen Gleeson	4	7^{7}	4
27	(Venezuela) Maurice Ruah	6	6^{5}	6

Second round
6	(Belgium) Bart Wuyts	3	7	7
(Socialist Federal Republic of Yugoslavia) Slobodan Živojinović	6	6	5
(The Bahamas) Roger Smith	6	7
27	(Venezuela) Maurice Ruah	2	6

Qualifying competition
6	(Belgium) Bart Wuyts	6	6
(The Bahamas) Roger Smith	1	2

=== Seventh qualifier ===
First round
(United States) Ryan Blake	6	6
(Italy) Federico Mordegan	0	1
(Venezuela) Nicolás Pereira	6	6
(United States) Bret Garnett	2	2
(Czechoslovakia) Cyril Suk	6	6
26	(South Africa) Danie Visser	3	1

Second round
7	(Czechoslovakia) Ctislav Doseděl	6	6
(United States) Ryan Blake	2	1
(Venezuela) Nicolás Pereira	6	6
(Czechoslovakia) Cyril Suk	4	2

Qualifying competition
7	(Czechoslovakia) Ctislav Doseděl	7	6
(Venezuela) Nicolás Pereira	5	4

=== Eighth qualifier ===
First round
(South Africa) Marcos Ondruska	6	6
WC	(Australia) Anastasios Vasiliadis	4	1
(New Zealand) Bruce Derlin	4	7^{8}	6
(Australia) Andrew Florent	6	6^{6}	8
(Australia) David Macpherson	2	1
25	(Netherlands) Tom Nijssen	6	6

Second round
8	(Germany) Christian Saceanu	6	6
(South Africa) Marcos Ondruska	1	4
(Australia) Andrew Florent	1	3
25	(Netherlands) Tom Nijssen	6	6

Qualifying competition
8	(Germany) Christian Saceanu	7	6
25	(Netherlands) Tom Nijssen	6	3

=== Ninth qualifier ===
First round
(Australia) Darren Patten	7	6
WC	(Australia) Bradley Sceney	5	1
(Australia) Peter Carter	3	6	6
(Italy) Michele Fioroni	6	1	2
(Australia) Dane Nebel	2	0
23	(United States) Jonathan Canter	6	6

Second round
9	(Socialist Federal Republic of Yugoslavia) Bruno Orešar	2	4
(Australia) Darren Patten	6	6
(Australia) Peter Carter	4	3
23	(United States) Jonathan Canter	6	6

Qualifying competition
(Australia) Darren Patten	4	4
23	(United States) Jonathan Canter	6	6

=== Tenth qualifier ===
First round
(United States) Steve DeVries	4	6^{3}
(Japan) Eduardo Furusho	6	7^{7}
WC	(Australia) Brent Larkham	5	1
(Australia) Ian Peter-Budge	7	6
(Australia) James Holmes	4	6	5
24	(South Africa) Pieter Aldrich	6	3	7

Second round
10	(Soviet Union) Dimitri Poliakov	6	6
(Japan) Eduardo Furusho	1	0
(Australia) Ian Peter-Budge	4	0
24	(South Africa) Pieter Aldrich	6	6

Qualifying competition
10	(Soviet Union) Dimitri Poliakov	6	6
24	(South Africa) Pieter Aldrich	1	3

=== Eleventh qualifier ===
First round
(Austria) Reinhard Wawra	3	3
(Australia) Jason Cask	6	6
(Australia) Jon Ireland	6	6
(Australia) Todd Larkham	2	2
(Sweden) Per Henricsson	6	7
22	(Australia) Neil Borwick	4	5

Second round
11	(Germany) Markus Zoecke	5	7	6
(Australia) Jason Cask	7	6	3
(Australia) Jon Ireland	4	6	3
(Sweden) Per Henricsson	6	3	6

Qualifying competition
11	(Germany) Markus Zoecke	6	6
(Sweden) Per Henricsson	3	1

=== Twelfth qualifier ===
First round
(France) Gilles Bastié	6^{4}	7	4
(United States) Larry Stefanki	7^{7}	5	6
(Australia) Wayne Arthurs	6	6
(United States) Rick Leach	2	1
(United Kingdom) Andrew Castle	4	6	6
21	(Nigeria) Nduka Odizor	6	4	1

Second round
12	(Argentina) Christian Miniussi	2	4
(United States) Larry Stefanki	6	6
(Australia) Wayne Arthurs	5	4
(United Kingdom) Andrew Castle	7	6

Qualifying competition
(United States) Larry Stefanki	4	4
(United Kingdom) Andrew Castle	6	6

=== Thirteenth qualifier ===
First round
(Australia) Peter Tramacchi	6	6
(Australia) Andrew Kratzmann	4	3
WC	(Australia) Paul Kilderry	3	6	6
(United States) John Letts	6	2	3
(United Kingdom) Danny Sapsford	1	3
19	(Argentina) Javier Frana	6	6

Second round
13	(Netherlands) Michiel Schapers	6	6
(Australia) Peter Tramacchi	2	4
WC	(Australia) Paul Kilderry	5	6	4
19	(Argentina) Javier Frana	7	4	6

Qualifying competition
13	(Netherlands) Michiel Schapers	5	6	10
19	(Argentina) Javier Frana	7	2	12

=== Fourteenth qualifier ===
First round
WC	(Australia) Marcus Thompson	5	3
(Australia) Charlton Eagle	7	6
WC	(Australia) Glen Kellett	2	2
(New Zealand) Steve Guy	6	6
(Indonesia) Lin Bing-chao	6^{4}	5
20	(Italy) Gianluca Pozzi	7^{7}	7

Second round
14	(South Africa) Wayne Ferreira	6	6
(Australia) Charlton Eagle	4	1
(New Zealand) Steve Guy	6	6
20	(Italy) Gianluca Pozzi	4	4

Qualifying competition
14	(South Africa) Wayne Ferreira	7	6
(New Zealand) Steve Guy	6	2

=== Fifteenth qualifier ===
First round
(Czechoslovakia) Vojtěch Flégl	4	6	0
(Netherlands) Joost Winnink	6	1	6
(Australia) Carl Limberger	6	2	6
(United States) Brian Page	4	6	4
(Australia) Matthew MacMahon	3	2
18	(Mexico) Leonardo Lavalle	6	6

Second round
15	(France) Arnaud Boetsch	7	6
(Netherlands) Joost Winnink	6	2
(Australia) Carl Limberger	2	6	3
18	(Mexico) Leonardo Lavalle	6	4	6

Qualifying competition
15	(France) Arnaud Boetsch	1	4
18	(Mexico) Leonardo Lavalle	6	6

=== Sixteenth qualifier ===
First round
(Australia) Roger Rasheed	6	6
(Australia) Grant Doyle	3	1
(South Africa) David Adams	6	6
(Sweden) Nicklas Utgren	4	2
(United States) Scott Patridge	6	6
17	(United States) Tommy Ho	4	4

Second round
16	(South Africa) Mark Kaplan	7	6
(Australia) Roger Rasheed	6	3
(South Africa) David Adams	3	6	3
(United States) Scott Patridge	6	2	6

Qualifying competition
16	(South Africa) Mark Kaplan	7	7
(United States) Scott Patridge	5	5
