= 1991 Australian Open – Women's singles qualifying =

Women's singles qualifying
- 1991 Australian Open

Events
Singles	men	women		boys	girls
Doubles	men	women	mixed	boys	girls
WC Singles	men	women	quad
WC Doubles	men	women	quad
Legends	men	women	mixed

Qualification
Singles	men	women
- Australian Open

This article displays the qualifying draw for women's singles at the 1991 Australian Open.

== Seeds ==
1. (West Germany) Marketa Kochta (qualified)
2. (Finland) Nanne Dahlman (second round)
3. (Soviet Union) Viktoria Milvidskaia Belinsky (second round)
4. -
5. (Netherlands) Miriam Oremans (qualifying competition, lucky loser)
6. (United States) Louise Allen (second round)
7. (Japan) Akemi Nishiya (qualifying competition)
8. (Sweden) Maria Ekstrand (qualified)
9. (United Kingdom) Julie Salmon (second round)
10. (Netherlands) Petra Kamstra (qualified)
11. (Indonesia) Suzanna Wibowo (second round)
12. (United States) Heather Ludloff (second round)
13. (United States) Stacey Schefflin (qualified)
14. (United States) Sandy Collins (qualified)
15. (United States) Akiko Gooden (second round)
16. (France) Sophie Amiach (second round)
17. (Germany) Maja Živec-Škulj (qualified)

== Qualifiers ==
1. (West Germany) Marketa Kochta
2. (Netherlands) Petra Kamstra
3. (Germany) Maja Živec-Škulj
4. (United States) Sandy Collins
5. (United States) Ginger Helgeson-Nielsen
6. (United States) Stacey Schefflin
7. (Sweden) Maria Ekstrand
8. (Netherlands) Ingelise Driehuis

== Lucky losers ==
1. (Netherlands) Miriam Oremans

== Qualifying draw ==
Key

- Q = Qualifier
- WC = Wild card
- LL = Lucky loser
- Alt = Alternate
- ITF = ITF entry
- PR = Protected ranking
- SR = Special ranking
- SE = Special exempt
- JE = Junior exempt
- JR = Junior Accelerator Programme entrant
- CO = College Accelerator Programme entrant
- NG = Next Gen Accelerator Program entrant
- w/o = Walkover
- r = Retired
- d = Defaulted

=== First qualifier ===
First round
(United States) Jill Smoller	6	6
(Argentina) Gabriela Mosca	3	4
(United States) Elly Hakami	6	6
(United States) Alysia May	2	4

Second round
1	(West Germany) Marketa Kochta	6	6
(United States) Jill Smoller	2	0
(United States) Elly Hakami	6	6^{7}	6
11	(Indonesia) Suzanna Wibowo	2	7^{9}	4

Qualifying competition
1	(West Germany) Marketa Kochta	6	6
(United States) Elly Hakami	3	2

=== Second qualifier ===
First round
(Sweden) Maria Lindström	6	6
(Australia) Lisa Keller	4	3

Second round
10	(Netherlands) Petra Kamstra	1	6	6
(Sweden) Maria Lindström	6	4	0
(Australia) Robyn Mawdsley	1	4
7	(Japan) Akemi Nishiya	6	6

Qualifying competition
10	(Netherlands) Petra Kamstra	6	6
7	(Japan) Akemi Nishiya	2	2

=== Third qualifier ===
First round
(Australia) Kristine Kunce	6	2	7
(Australia) Clare Thompson	3	6	5
(Australia) Alison Scott	3	4
(Australia) Joanne Limmer	6	6

Second round
17	(Germany) Maja Živec-Škulj	6	6
(Australia) Kristine Kunce	1	3
(Australia) Joanne Limmer	6	1	6
16	(France) Sophie Amiach	3	6	2

Qualifying competition
17	(Germany) Maja Živec-Škulj	7	6
(Australia) Joanne Limmer	5	0

=== Fourth qualifier ===
First round
(Soviet Union) Eugenia Maniokova	7^{7}	2	6
(South Africa) Lise Gregory	6^{1}	6	4
(Japan) Yuka Yoshida	w/o
(Australia) Louise Pleming

Second round
14	(United States) Sandy Collins	7	6
(Soviet Union) Eugenia Maniokova	5	4
(Australia) Louise Pleming	0	3
5	(Netherlands) Miriam Oremans	6	6

Qualifying competition
14	(United States) Sandy Collins	6	6
5	(Netherlands) Miriam Oremans	3	2

=== Fifth qualifier ===
First round
(Netherlands) Helen Van Den Berg	1	4
(United States) Ginger Helgeson-Nielsen	6	6
(Japan) Ai Sugiyama	w/o
(South Africa) Lisa Seemann

Second round
6	(United States) Louise Allen	2	1^{r}
(United States) Ginger Helgeson-Nielsen	6	4
(South Africa) Lisa Seemann	7^{7}	6
15	(United States) Akiko Gooden	6^{3}	4

Qualifying competition
(United States) Ginger Helgeson-Nielsen	6	6
(South Africa) Lisa Seemann	4	0

=== Sixth qualifier ===
First round
(Japan) Emiko Okagawa	6	4	6
(Australia) Jane Taylor	1	6	4
(United Kingdom) Belinda Borneo	3	1
(Canada) Jill Hetherington	6	6

Second round
13	(United States) Stacey Schefflin	5	6	9
(Japan) Emiko Okagawa	7	4	7
(Canada) Jill Hetherington	2	6	8
3	(Soviet Union) Viktoria Milvidskaia Belinsky	6	3	6

Qualifying competition
13	(United States) Stacey Schefflin	7	5	6
(Canada) Jill Hetherington	5	7	0

=== Seventh qualifier ===
First round
(France) Sybille Niox-Château	6	6
(Australia) Justine Hodder	3	3

Second round
8	(Sweden) Maria Ekstrand	7^{7}	4	7
(France) Sybille Niox-Château	6^{5}	6	5
(New Zealand) Hana Guy	7	6
12	(United States) Heather Ludloff	5	1

Qualifying competition
8	(Sweden) Maria Ekstrand	6	6
(New Zealand) Hana Guy	1	3

=== Eighth qualifier ===
First round
(Sweden) Miriam Ponce De Leon	3	1
(Australia) Angie Woolcock	6	6
(Netherlands) Ingelise Driehuis	7	4	6
(Australia) Kerry-Anne Guse	5	6	3

Second round
9	(United Kingdom) Julie Salmon	6	6^{5}	0
(Australia) Angie Woolcock	3	7^{7}	6
(Netherlands) Ingelise Driehuis	6	7
2	(Finland) Nanne Dahlman	4	5

Qualifying competition
(Australia) Angie Woolcock	7	6^{1}	2
(Netherlands) Ingelise Driehuis	5	7^{7}	6
