= Maria Ekstrand =

Swedish tennis player

- Country (sports): Sweden
- Born: 2 March 1970 (age 55)
- Prize money: $69,254

Singles
- Highest ranking: No. 149 (15 July 1991)

Grand Slam singles results
- Australian Open: 2R (1991)

Doubles
- Highest ranking: No. 142 (9 July 1990)

Grand Slam doubles results
- Australian Open: 1R (1989, 1990, 1991)

Maria Ekstrand (born 2 March 1970) is a Swedish former professional tennis player.

Ekstrand, who reached a best singles ranking of 149, claimed two $25,000 ITF titles during her career, in Benin City in 1988 and York, Pennsylvania in 1990. Most notably, Ekstrand won through to the second round of the 1991 Australian Open, where she was eliminated by fourth seed Gabriela Sabatini.

== ITF finals ==
$75,000 tournaments
$25,000 tournaments
$10,000 tournaments

=== Singles: 5 (3–2) ===
Result	No.	Date	Tournament	Surface	Opponent	Score
Loss	1.	1 February 1988	Tapiola, Finland	Hard	(West Germany) Martina Pawlik	4–6, 4–6
Win	1.	28 November 1988	Okpe, Nigeria	Hard	(Netherlands) Titia Wilmink	7–5, 7–6
Win	2.	5 December 1988	Benin City, Nigeria	Hard	(Netherlands) Titia Wilmink	6–1, 6–4
Win	3.	1 October 1990	York, United States	Hard	(United States) Stacey Schefflin	6–2, 6–1
Loss	2.	18 January 1993	Helsinki, Finland	Carpet	(Italy) Elena Savoldi	2–6, 0–6

=== Doubles: 8 (1–7) ===
Result	No.	Date	Tournament	Surface	Partner	Opponents	Score
Loss	1.	2 February 1987	Hørsholm, Denmark	Carpet	(Denmark) Lone Vandborg	(Sweden) Maria Strandlund (Sweden) Jonna Jonerup	1–6, 3–6
Loss	2.	21 September 1987	Llorca, Spain	Clay	(Sweden) Monica Lundqvist	(Norway) Amy Jönsson Raaholt (Hong Kong) Paulette Moreno	6–7, 7–6, 5–7
Loss	3.	25 April 1988	Sutton, United Kingdom	Clay	(Sweden) Monica Lundqvist	(United Kingdom) Amanda Grunfeld (United Kingdom) Jo Louis	6–4, 6–7, 4–6
Loss	4.	28 November 1988	Okpe, Nigeria	Hard	(Netherlands) Jana Koran	(Netherlands) Titia Wilmink (Belgium) Corine Bousmans	6–7^{(0)}, 1–6
Win	1.	5 December 1988	Benin City, Nigeria	Hard	(Netherlands) Titia Wilmink	(Belgium) Corine Bousmans (United States) Hemel Meghani	6–2, 6–3
Loss	5.	17 July 1989	Darmstadt, West Germany	Clay	(Switzerland) Michèle Strebel	(Czechoslovakia) Petra Holubová (Czechoslovakia) Nora Bajčíková	3–6, 2–6
Loss	6.	21 October 1991	Ōita, Japan	Hard	(Germany) Sabine Lohmann	(Mexico) Lupita Novelo (Australia) Kristine Kunce	1–6, 5–7
Loss	7.	18 January 1993	Helsinki, Finland	Carpet	(Belgium) Vanessa Matthys	(Italy) Susanna Attili (Italy) Elena Savoldi	7–5, 3–6, 3–6
