= Monica Lundqvist =

Swedish tennis player

- Country (sports): Sweden
- Born: 18 April 1967 (age 57)
- Retired: 1991
- Prize money: $24,010

Singles
- Career record: 51–50
- Highest ranking: No. 143 (5 January 1987)

Doubles
- Career record: 24–28
- Career titles: 1 ITF
- Highest ranking: No. 248 (20 June 1988)

Monica Lundqvist (born 18 April 1967) is a Swedish former professional tennis player.

== Biography ==
Lundqvist, who comes from Sundsvall, reached a best singles ranking of 143 in the world.

Her best performances on the WTA Tour came in 1986, when she made the round of 16 at the Taipei Women's Championships and Singapore Open, beating a young Arantxa Sánchez Vicario in the former.

She appeared in two Federation Cup ties for Sweden, against France and Belgium, both in 1986.

== ITF finals ==
$25,000 tournaments
$10,000 tournaments

=== Singles (0-1) ===
Result	No.	Date	Tournament	Surface	Opponent	Score
Loss	1.	4 November 1985	Sydney, Australia	Grass	(Sweden) Helena Dahlström	4–6, 6–3, 6–7

=== Doubles (1-2) ===
Result	No.	Date	Tournament	Surface	Partner	Opponents	Score
Loss	1.	21 September 1987	Llorca, Spain	Clay	(Sweden) Maria Ekstrand	(Norway) Amy Jönsson Raaholt (Hong Kong) Paulette Moreno	6–7, 7–6, 5–7
Win	2.	30 November 1987	Budapest, Hungary	Clay	(Sweden) Catrin Jexell	(Hungary) Petra Schmitt (West Germany) Caroline Schneider	6–3, 6–2
Loss	3.	25 April 1988	Sutton, United Kingdom	Clay	(Sweden) Maria Ekstrand	(United Kingdom) Amanda Grunfeld (United Kingdom) Jo Louis	6–4, 6–7, 4–6

== See also ==
- List of Sweden Fed Cup team representatives
