= Wilmink =

Wilmink is a surname. Notable people with the surname include:

- Titia Wilmink (born 1968), Dutch tennis player
- Willem Wilmink (1936–2003), Dutch poet and writer
