= List of ATP number 1 ranked doubles tennis players =

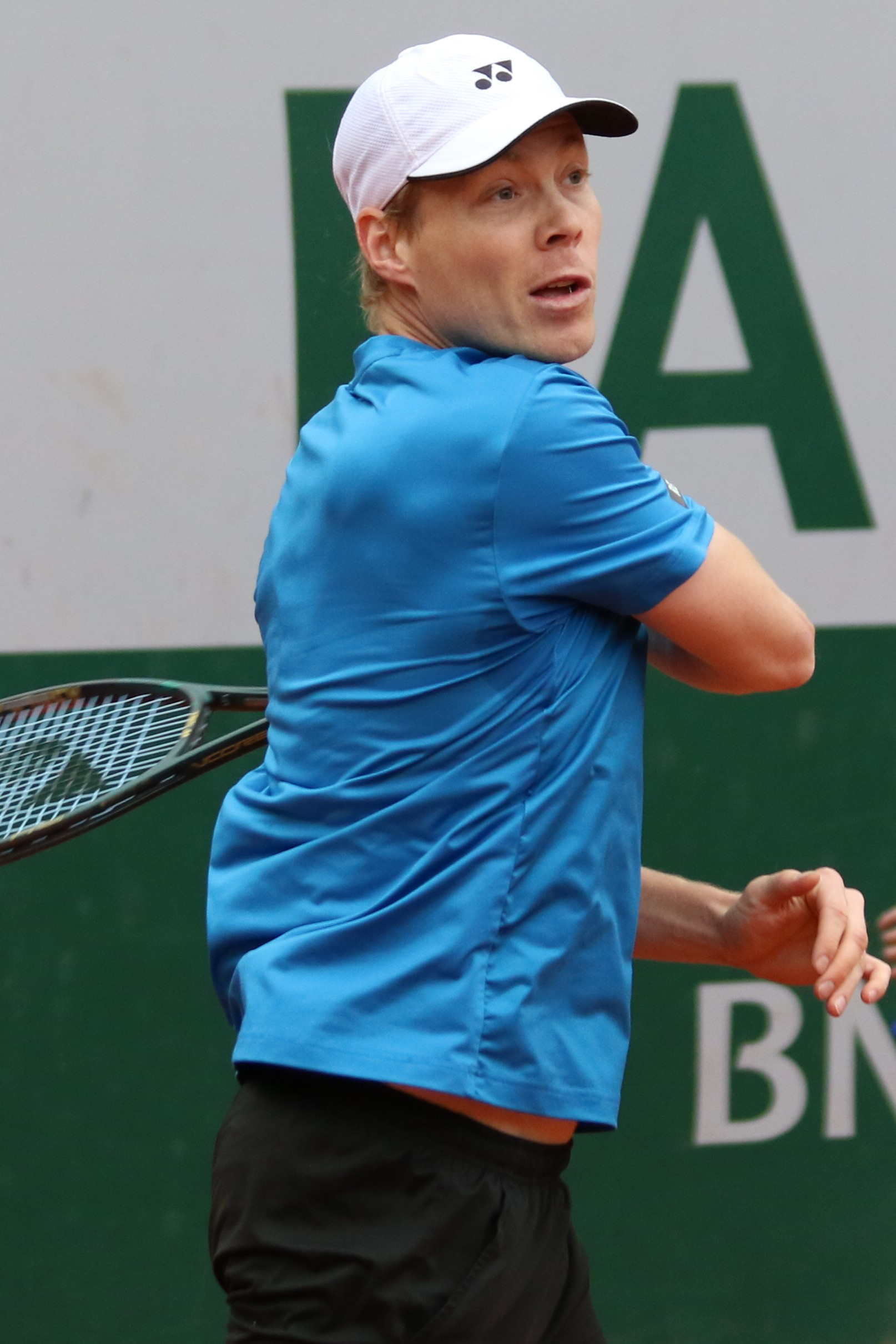
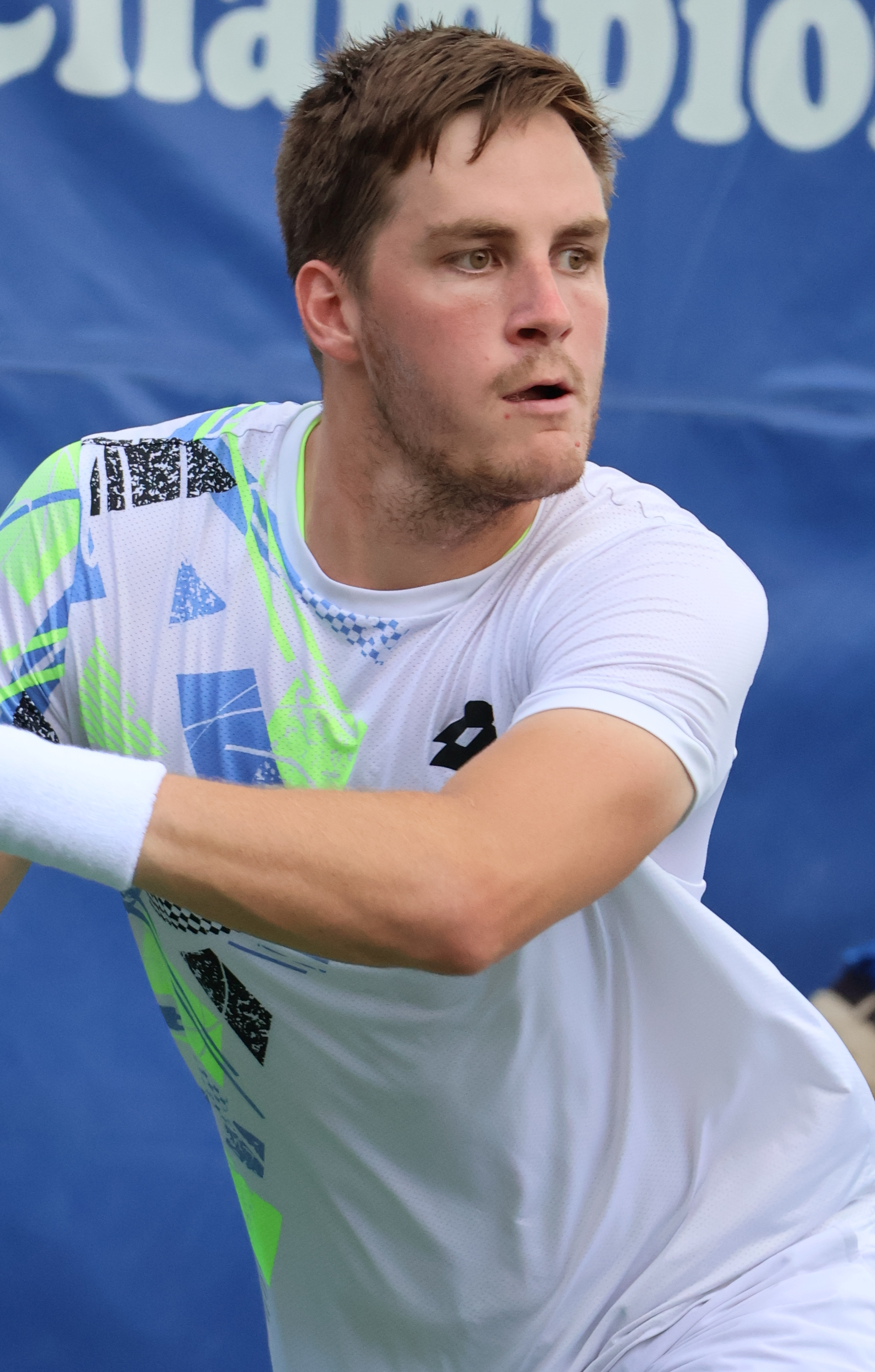
Current men's doubles joint world No. 1's: Harri Heliövaara (left) and Henry Patten (right)

The ATP rankings by the Association of Tennis Professionals (ATP) are the merit-based system for determining the rankings in men's tennis. In doubles, the top-ranked team is the pair who, over the previous 52 weeks, has gathered the most ATP rankings points. Points are awarded based on how far a team advances in tournaments and the category of those tournaments. The ATP has used a computerized system for determining doubles rankings since 1976. An updated rankings list is released at the beginning of each week.

Since the introduction of the ATP rankings the method used to calculate a player's ranking points has changed several times. As of 2017, ranking is based on calculating, for each player, his total points from his best 18 results from all eligible tournaments, including the ATP Finals (Doubles) played in the 52-week ranking period. For entry purposes there are no mandatory events, however, once a player is accepted in the main draw of one of these 12 tournaments, as a direct acceptance, a qualifier or a lucky loser or having accepted a wildcard, his result in this tournament shall count for his ranking, whether or not he participates.

The current world No. 1 players are Harri Heliövaara and Henry Patten.

== ATP No. 1 ranked doubles players ==
Data is from the ATP. The doubles rankings began on March 1, 1976.

First-time No. 1 player.
Current No. 1 player(s) (weeks are automatically updated).
‡ ATP rankings record.

No.	Player	Start date	End date	Weeks	Total
1	Bob Hewitt (RSA)	Mar 1, 1976	Apr 11, 1976	6	6
2	Raúl Ramírez (MEX)	Apr 12, 1976	Apr 24, 1977	54	54
3	Frew McMillan (RSA)	Apr 25, 1977	May 22, 1977	4	4
	(Mexico) Raúl Ramírez (2)	May 23, 1977	Jul 3, 1977	6	60
	(South Africa) Frew McMillan (2)	Jul 4, 1977	Jul 10, 1977	1	5
	(Mexico) Raúl Ramírez (3)	Jul 11, 1977	Jul 24, 1977	2	62
	(South Africa) Frew McMillan (3)	Jul 25, 1977	Feb 4, 1979	80	85
4	Tom Okker (NED)	Feb 5, 1979	Apr 22, 1979	11	11
5	John McEnroe (USA)	Apr 23, 1979	Mar 1, 1981	97	97
6	Stan Smith (USA)	Mar 2, 1981	Apr 26, 1981	8	8
	(United States) John McEnroe (2)	Apr 27, 1981	May 24, 1981	4	101
7	Paul McNamee (AUS)	May 25, 1981	Jun 14, 1981	3	3
	(United States) John McEnroe (3)	Jun 15, 1981	Jan 31, 1982	33	134
8	Peter Fleming (USA)	Feb 1, 1982	Feb 21, 1982	3	3
	(United States) John McEnroe (4)	Feb 22, 1982	Mar 18, 1984	108	242
	(United States) Peter Fleming (2)	Mar 19, 1984	Mar 25, 1984	1	4
	(United States) John McEnroe (5)	Mar 26, 1984	Jun 10, 1984	11	253
	(United States) Peter Fleming (3)	Jun 11, 1984	Aug 5, 1984	8	12
	(United States) John McEnroe (6)	Aug 6, 1984	Aug 12, 1984	1	254
	(United States) Peter Fleming (4)	Aug 13, 1984	Sep 16, 1984	5	17
	(United States) John McEnroe (7)	Sep 17, 1984	Dec 16, 1984	13	267
9	Tomáš Šmíd (TCH)	Dec 17, 1984	Aug 11, 1985	34	34
10	Anders Järryd (SWE)	Aug 12, 1985	Sep 8, 1985	4	4
11	Robert Seguso (USA)	Sep 9, 1985	Sep 15, 1985	1	1
	(Sweden) Anders Järryd (2)	Sep 16, 1985	Sep 29, 1985	2	6
	(United States) Robert Seguso (2)	Sep 30, 1985	Oct 13, 1985	2	3
12	Ken Flach (USA)	Oct 14, 1985	Oct 20, 1985	1	1
	(United States) Robert Seguso (3)	Oct 21, 1985	Dec 15, 1985	8	11
	(United States) Ken Flach (2)	Dec 16, 1985	Dec 22, 1985	1	2
	(United States) Robert Seguso (4)	Dec 23, 1985	Feb 2, 1986	6	17
	(Sweden) Anders Järryd (3)	Feb 3, 1986	Feb 9, 1986	1	7
	(United States) Robert Seguso (5)	Feb 10, 1986	Feb 23, 1986	2	19
	(Sweden) Anders Järryd (4)	Feb 24, 1986	Mar 16, 1986	3	10
	(United States) Robert Seguso (6)	Mar 17, 1986	Mar 23, 1986	1	20
	(Sweden) Anders Järryd (5)	Mar 24, 1986	Mar 30, 1986	1	11
	(United States) Robert Seguso (7)	Mar 31, 1986	May 18, 1986	7	27
	(United States) Ken Flach (3)	May 19, 1986	Jun 8, 1986	3	5
13	Stefan Edberg (SWE)	Jun 9, 1986	Aug 24, 1986	11	11
14	Yannick Noah (FRA)	Aug 25, 1986	Sep 7, 1986	2	2
15	Slobodan Živojinović (YUG)	Sep 8, 1986	Sep 14, 1986	1	1
16	Andrés Gómez (ECU)	Sep 15, 1986	Sep 21, 1986	1	1
	(Socialist Federal Republic of Yugoslavia) Slobodan Živojinović (2)	Sep 22, 1986	Oct 19, 1986	4	5
	(Ecuador) Andrés Gómez (2)	Oct 20, 1986	Nov 9, 1986	3	4
	(Socialist Federal Republic of Yugoslavia) Slobodan Živojinović (3)	Nov 10, 1986	Nov 23, 1986	2	7
	(Ecuador) Andrés Gómez (3)	Nov 24, 1986	Jan 25, 1987	9	13
	(Sweden) Stefan Edberg (2)	Jan 26, 1987	Feb 22, 1987	4	15
	(France) Yannick Noah (2)	Feb 23, 1987	Apr 19, 1987	8	10
	(Sweden) Anders Järryd (6)	Apr 20, 1987	May 10, 1987	3	14
	(France) Yannick Noah (3)	May 11, 1987	Jul 5, 1987	8	18
	(Sweden) Anders Järryd (7)	Jul 6, 1987	Aug 9, 1987	5	19
	(United States) Robert Seguso (8)	Aug 10, 1987	Aug 16, 1987	1	28
	(France) Yannick Noah (4)	Aug 17, 1987	Aug 23, 1987	1	19
	(United States) Robert Seguso (9)	Aug 24, 1987	Mar 27, 1988	31	59
	(Sweden) Anders Järryd (8)	Mar 28, 1988	Apr 17, 1988	3	22
	(United States) Robert Seguso (10)	Apr 18, 1988	May 8, 1988	3	62
	(Sweden) Anders Järryd (9)	May 9, 1988	Apr 2, 1989	47	69
17	Emilio Sánchez (ESP)	Apr 3, 1989	Apr 16, 1989	2	2
	(Sweden) Anders Järryd (10)	Apr 17, 1989	May 14, 1989	4	73
	(Spain) Emilio Sánchez (2)	May 15, 1989	Jun 11, 1989	4	6
18	Jim Grabb (USA)	Jun 12, 1989	Jun 18, 1989	1	1
19	Jim Pugh (USA)	Jun 19, 1989	Sep 10, 1989	12	12
	(United States) John McEnroe (8)	Sep 11, 1989	Sep 24, 1989	2	269
	(Sweden) Anders Järryd (11)	Sep 25, 1989	Jan 28, 1990	18	91
20	Danie Visser (RSA)	Jan 29, 1990	Mar 25, 1990	8	8
21	Rick Leach (USA)	Mar 26, 1990	May 27, 1990	9	9
	(United States) Jim Pugh (2)	May 28, 1990	Jul 22, 1990	8	20
22	Pieter Aldrich (RSA)	Jul 23, 1990	Aug 12, 1990	3	3
	(South Africa) Danie Visser (2)	Jul 23, 1990	Aug 12, 1990	3	11
	(United States) Jim Pugh (3)	Aug 13, 1990	Sep 9, 1990	4	24
	(South Africa) Pieter Aldrich (2)	Sep 10, 1990	Nov 4, 1990	8	11
	(South Africa) Danie Visser (3)	Sep 10, 1990	Nov 4, 1990	8	19
	(United States) Jim Pugh (4)	Nov 5, 1990	Nov 11, 1990	1	25
	(South Africa) Pieter Aldrich (3)	Nov 12, 1990	Nov 18, 1990	1	12
	(South Africa) Danie Visser (4)	Nov 12, 1990	Nov 18, 1990	1	20
	(United States) Jim Pugh (5)	Nov 19, 1990	Nov 25, 1990	1	26
	(South Africa) Pieter Aldrich (4)	Nov 26, 1990	Jan 13, 1991	7	19
	(South Africa) Danie Visser (5)	Nov 26, 1990	Jan 13, 1991	7	27
23	David Pate (USA)	Jan 14, 1991	Jul 7, 1991	25	25
24	John Fitzgerald (AUS)	Jul 8, 1991	Feb 23, 1992	33	33
	(Sweden) Anders Järryd (12)	Feb 24, 1992	Mar 1, 1992	1	92
	(Australia) John Fitzgerald (2)	Mar 2, 1992	Mar 8, 1992	1	34
	(Sweden) Anders Järryd (13)	Mar 9, 1992	May 3, 1992	8	100
	(Australia) John Fitzgerald (3)	May 4, 1992	Jun 14, 1992	6	40
	(Sweden) Anders Järryd (14)	Jun 15, 1992	Jul 5, 1992	3	103
25	Todd Woodbridge (AUS)	Jul 6, 1992	Jul 19, 1992	2	2
	(Sweden) Anders Järryd (15)	Jul 20, 1992	Aug 16, 1992	4	107
	(Australia) Todd Woodbridge (2)	Aug 17, 1992	Sep 13, 1992	4	6
	(United States) Jim Grabb (2)	Sep 14, 1992	Oct 11, 1992	4	5
26	Kelly Jones (USA)	Oct 12, 1992	Oct 18, 1992	1	1
	(United States) Jim Grabb (3)	Oct 19, 1992	Nov 1, 1992	2	7
	(Australia) Todd Woodbridge (3)	Nov 2, 1992	Nov 15, 1992	2	8
27	Mark Woodforde (AUS)	Nov 16, 1992	Jan 31, 1993	11	11
28	Richey Reneberg (USA)	Feb 1, 1993	Mar 7, 1993	5	5
	(United States) Jim Grabb (4)	Mar 8, 1993	Apr 18, 1993	6	13
	(United States) Richey Reneberg (2)	Apr 19, 1993	Jun 13, 1993	8	13
	(Australia) Todd Woodbridge (4)	Jun 14, 1993	Oct 17, 1993	18	26
29	Patrick Galbraith (USA)	Oct 18, 1993	Nov 7, 1993	3	3
	(Australia) Todd Woodbridge (5)	Nov 8, 1993	Nov 14, 1993	1	27
30	Grant Connell (CAN)	Nov 15, 1993	Jan 30, 1994	11	11
31	Paul Haarhuis (NED)	Jan 31, 1994	Feb 13, 1994	2	2
32	Byron Black (ZIM)	Feb 14, 1994	Feb 20, 1994	1	1
	(Netherlands) Paul Haarhuis (2)	Feb 21, 1994	Mar 6, 1994	2	4
	(Canada) Grant Connell (2)	Mar 7, 1994	Mar 20, 1994	2	13
	(Netherlands) Paul Haarhuis (3)	Mar 21, 1994	May 8, 1994	7	11
	(Canada) Grant Connell (3)	May 9, 1994	Jun 5, 1994	4	17
	(Zimbabwe) Byron Black (2)	Jun 6, 1994	Jul 24, 1994	7	8
	(United States) Patrick Galbraith (2)	Jul 25, 1994	Jul 31, 1994	1	4
33	Jonathan Stark (USA)	Aug 1, 1994	Sep 11, 1994	6	6
	(Netherlands) Paul Haarhuis (4)	Sep 12, 1994	Jan 15, 1995	18	29
	(Netherlands) Paul Haarhuis (4)	Jan 16, 1995	Feb 12, 1995	4	33
34	Jacco Eltingh (NED)	Jan 16, 1995	Feb 12, 1995	4	4
	(Netherlands) Paul Haarhuis (4)	Feb 13, 1995	Apr 2, 1995	7	40
	(Australia) Mark Woodforde (2)	Apr 3, 1995	Jun 11, 1995	10	21
	(Netherlands) Paul Haarhuis (5)	Jun 12, 1995	Sep 10, 1995	13	53
	(Netherlands) Jacco Eltingh (2)	Jun 12, 1995	Sep 10, 1995	13	17
	(Australia) Todd Woodbridge (6)	Sep 11, 1995	Oct 29, 1995	7	34
	(Netherlands) Jacco Eltingh (3)	Oct 30, 1995	Nov 5, 1995	1	18
	(Netherlands) Paul Haarhuis (6)	Oct 30, 1995	Nov 5, 1995	1	54
	(Australia) Todd Woodbridge (7)	Nov 6, 1995	Oct 13, 1996	49	83
	(Australia) Todd Woodbridge (7)	Oct 14, 1996	Oct 12, 1997	52	135
	(Australia) Mark Woodforde (3)	Oct 14, 1996	Oct 12, 1997	52	73
	(Australia) Todd Woodbridge (7)	Oct 13, 1997	Mar 29, 1998	24	159
	(Netherlands) Jacco Eltingh (4)	Mar 30, 1998	Jan 31, 1999	44	62
	(Netherlands) Paul Haarhuis (7)	Feb 1, 1999	Apr 25, 1999	12	66
35	Mahesh Bhupathi (IND)	Apr 26, 1999	May 9, 1999	2	2
	(Netherlands) Paul Haarhuis (8)	May 10, 1999	Jun 6, 1999	4	70
	(India) Mahesh Bhupathi (2)	Jun 7, 1999	Jun 20, 1999	2	4
36	Leander Paes (IND)	Jun 21, 1999	Mar 19, 2000	39	39
37	Jared Palmer (USA)	Mar 20, 2000	May 7, 2000	7	7
38	Alex O'Brien (USA)	May 8, 2000	Jun 11, 2000	5	5
	(Australia) Todd Woodbridge (8)	Jun 12, 2000	Oct 29, 2000	20	179
	(Australia) Mark Woodforde (4)	Oct 30, 2000	Jan 7, 2001	10	83
	(Australia) Todd Woodbridge (9)	Jan 8, 2001	Jul 8, 2001	26	205
39	Jonas Björkman (SWE)	Jul 9, 2001	Jan 27, 2002	29	29
40	Donald Johnson (USA)	Jan 28, 2002	Apr 14, 2002	11	11
	(United States) Donald Johnson (1)	Apr 15, 2002	May 12, 2002	4	15
	(United States) Jared Palmer (2)	Apr 15, 2002	May 12, 2002	4	11
	(United States) Jared Palmer (2)	May 13, 2002	May 19, 2002	1	12
	(United States) Jared Palmer (2)	May 20, 2002	Jun 23, 2002	5	17
	(United States) Donald Johnson (2)	May 20, 2002	Jun 23, 2002	5	20
41	Mark Knowles (BAH)	Jun 24, 2002	Aug 18, 2002	8	8
42	Daniel Nestor (CAN)	Aug 19, 2002	Nov 3, 2002	11	11
	(The Bahamas) Mark Knowles (2)	Nov 4, 2002	Jun 8, 2003	31	39
43	Max Mirnyi (BLR)	Jun 9, 2003	Sep 7, 2003	13	13
44	Bob Bryan (USA)	Sep 8, 2003	Oct 19, 2003	6	6
45	Mike Bryan (USA)	Sep 8, 2003	Oct 19, 2003	6	6
	(Belarus) Max Mirnyi (2)	Oct 20, 2003	Feb 1, 2004	15	28
	(United States) Bob Bryan (2)	Feb 2, 2004	Jun 6, 2004	18	24
	(United States) Mike Bryan (2)	Feb 2, 2004	Jun 6, 2004	18	24
	(Sweden) Jonas Björkman (2)	Jun 7, 2004	Sep 12, 2004	14	43
	(Canada) Daniel Nestor (2)	Sep 13, 2004	Oct 3, 2004	3	14
	(Canada) Daniel Nestor (2)	Oct 4, 2004	Feb 27, 2005	21	35
	(The Bahamas) Mark Knowles (3)	Oct 4, 2004	Feb 27, 2005	21	60
	(Sweden) Jonas Björkman (3)	Feb 28, 2005	Mar 20, 2005	3	46
	(Canada) Daniel Nestor (3)	Mar 21, 2005	Apr 24, 2005	5	40
	(The Bahamas) Mark Knowles (4)	Mar 21, 2005	Apr 24, 2005	5	65
	(Sweden) Jonas Björkman (4)	Apr 25, 2005	Nov 6, 2005	28	74
	(United States) Bob Bryan (3)	Nov 7, 2005	Jan 28, 2007	64	88
	(United States) Mike Bryan (3)	Nov 7, 2005	Jan 28, 2007	64	88
	(Belarus) Max Mirnyi (3)	Jan 29, 2007	Apr 15, 2007	11	39
	(United States) Bob Bryan (4)	Apr 16, 2007	Jul 6, 2008	64	152
	(United States) Mike Bryan (4)	Apr 16, 2007	Jul 6, 2008	64	152
	(Canada) Daniel Nestor (4)	Jul 7, 2008	Sep 7, 2008	9	49
	(United States) Bob Bryan (5)	Sep 8, 2008	Oct 19, 2008	6	158
	(United States) Mike Bryan (5)	Sep 8, 2008	Oct 19, 2008	6	158
	(Canada) Daniel Nestor (5)	Oct 20, 2008	Nov 2, 2008	2	51
	(United States) Bob Bryan (6)	Nov 3, 2008	Nov 16, 2008	2	160
	(United States) Mike Bryan (6)	Nov 3, 2008	Nov 16, 2008	2	160
46	Nenad Zimonjić (SRB)	Nov 17, 2008	Feb 1, 2009	11	11
	(United States) Bob Bryan (7)	Feb 2, 2009	May 17, 2009	15	175
	(United States) Mike Bryan (7)	Feb 2, 2009	May 17, 2009	15	175
	(Canada) Daniel Nestor (6)	May 18, 2009	Jun 7, 2009	3	54
	(Serbia) Nenad Zimonjić (2)	May 18, 2009	Jun 7, 2009	3	14
	(United States) Bob Bryan (8)	Jun 8, 2009	Sep 13, 2009	14	189
	(United States) Mike Bryan (8)	Jun 8, 2009	Sep 13, 2009	14	189
	(Canada) Daniel Nestor (7)	Sep 14, 2009	Nov 1, 2009	7	61
	(Canada) Daniel Nestor (7)	Nov 2, 2009	Nov 29, 2009	4	65
	(Serbia) Nenad Zimonjić (3)	Nov 2, 2009	Nov 29, 2009	4	18
	(United States) Bob Bryan (9)	Nov 30, 2009	Jan 31, 2010	9	198
	(United States) Mike Bryan (9)	Nov 30, 2009	Jan 31, 2010	9	198
	(Canada) Daniel Nestor (8)	Feb 1, 2010	May 16, 2010	15	80
	(Serbia) Nenad Zimonjić (4)	Feb 1, 2010	May 16, 2010	15	33
	(United States) Bob Bryan (10)	May 17, 2010	Jun 6, 2010	3	201
	(United States) Mike Bryan (10)	May 17, 2010	Jun 6, 2010	3	201
	(Canada) Daniel Nestor (9)	Jun 7, 2010	Aug 15, 2010	10	90
	(Serbia) Nenad Zimonjić (5)	Jun 7, 2010	Aug 15, 2010	10	43
	(United States) Bob Bryan (11)	Aug 16, 2010	May 6, 2012	90	291
	(United States) Mike Bryan (11)	Aug 16, 2010	May 6, 2012	90	291
	(Canada) Daniel Nestor (10)	May 7, 2012	Sep 9, 2012	18	108
	(Belarus) Max Mirnyi (4)	May 7, 2012	Sep 9, 2012	18	57
	(United States) Bob Bryan (12)	Sep 10, 2012	Nov 4, 2012	8	299
	(United States) Mike Bryan (12)	Sep 10, 2012	Nov 4, 2012	8	299
	(United States) Mike Bryan (12)	Nov 5, 2012	Feb 24, 2013	16	315
	(United States) Bob Bryan (13)	Feb 25, 2013	Oct 25, 2015	139^{‡}	438
	(United States) Mike Bryan (12)	Feb 25, 2013	Oct 25, 2015	139^{‡}	454
	(United States) Bob Bryan (13)	Oct 26, 2015	Nov 1, 2015	1	439
47	Marcelo Melo (BRA)	Nov 2, 2015	Apr 3, 2016	22	22
48	Jamie Murray (GBR)	Apr 4, 2016	May 8, 2016	5	5
	(Brazil) Marcelo Melo (2)	May 9, 2016	Jun 5, 2016	4	26
49	Nicolas Mahut (FRA)	Jun 6, 2016	Jun 12, 2016	1	1
	(United Kingdom) Jamie Murray (2)	Jun 13, 2016	Jul 10, 2016	4	9
	(France) Nicolas Mahut (2)	Jul 11, 2016	Apr 2, 2017	38	39
50	Henri Kontinen (FIN)	Apr 3, 2017	Jul 16, 2017	15	15
	(Brazil) Marcelo Melo (3)	Jul 17, 2017	Aug 20, 2017	5	31
	(Finland) Henri Kontinen (2)	Aug 21, 2017	Nov 5, 2017	11	26
	(Brazil) Marcelo Melo (4)	Nov 6, 2017	Jan 7, 2018	9	40
	(Brazil) Marcelo Melo (4)	Jan 8, 2018	Apr 29, 2018	16	56
51	Łukasz Kubot (POL)	Jan 8, 2018	Apr 29, 2018	16	16
	(Poland) Łukasz Kubot (1)	Apr 30, 2018	May 20, 2018	3	19
52	Mate Pavić (CRO)	May 21, 2018	Jul 15, 2018	8	8
	(United States) Mike Bryan (13)	Jul 16, 2018	Jul 14, 2019	52	506^{‡}
53	Juan Sebastián Cabal (COL)	Jul 15, 2019	Feb 2, 2020	29	29
54	Robert Farah (COL)	Jul 15, 2019	Feb 2, 2020	29	29
	(Colombia) Robert Farah (1)	Feb 3, 2020	Mar 22, 2020	7	36
	Rankings frozen	Mar 23, 2020	Aug 23, 2020	22	
	(Colombia) Robert Farah (1)	Aug 24, 2020	Apr 4, 2021	32	68
	(Croatia) Mate Pavić (2)	Apr 5, 2021	Oct 17, 2021	28	36
55	Nikola Mektić (CRO)	Oct 18, 2021	Nov 7, 2021	3	3
	(Croatia) Mate Pavić (3)	Nov 8, 2021	Apr 3, 2022	21	57
56	Joe Salisbury (GBR)	Apr 4, 2022	Oct 2, 2022	26	26
57	Rajeev Ram (USA)	Oct 3, 2022	Nov 6, 2022	5	5
58	Wesley Koolhof (NED)	Nov 7, 2022	Nov 13, 2022	1	1
	(Netherlands) Wesley Koolhof (1)	Nov 14, 2022	Jan 15, 2023	9	10
59	Neal Skupski (GBR)	Nov 14, 2022	Jan 15, 2023	9	9
	(United States) Rajeev Ram (2)	Jan 16, 2023	Jan 29, 2023	2	7
	(Netherlands) Wesley Koolhof (2)	Jan 30, 2023	Feb 19, 2023	3	13
	(United Kingdom) Neal Skupski (2)	Jan 30, 2023	Feb 19, 2023	3	12
	(United States) Rajeev Ram (3)	Feb 20, 2023	Mar 5, 2023	2	9
	(Netherlands) Wesley Koolhof (3)	Mar 6, 2023	Jun 11, 2023	14	27
	(United Kingdom) Neal Skupski (3)	Mar 6, 2023	Jun 11, 2023	14	26
60	Austin Krajicek (USA)	Jun 12, 2023	Jun 18, 2023	1	1
	(Netherlands) Wesley Koolhof (4)	Jun 19, 2023	Jun 25, 2023	1	28
	(United Kingdom) Neal Skupski (4)	Jun 19, 2023	Jun 25, 2023	1	27
	(United States) Austin Krajicek (2)	Jun 26, 2023	Jul 16, 2023	3	4
	(Netherlands) Wesley Koolhof (5)	Jul 17, 2023	Aug 27, 2023	6	34
	(United Kingdom) Neal Skupski (5)	Jul 17, 2023	Aug 27, 2023	6	33
	(United Kingdom) Neal Skupski (5)	Aug 28, 2023	Sep 10, 2023	2	35
	(United States) Austin Krajicek (3)	Sep 11, 2023	Jan 28, 2024	20	24
61	Rohan Bopanna (IND) (Note: Bopanna became the oldest player to debut atop the rankings.)	Jan 29, 2024	Feb 25, 2024	4	4
62	Matthew Ebden (AUS)	Feb 26, 2024	Mar 3, 2024	1	1
	(India) Rohan Bopanna (2)	Mar 4, 2024	Mar 17, 2024	2	6
	(United States) Austin Krajicek (4)	Mar 18, 2024	Mar 31, 2024	2	26
	(India) Rohan Bopanna (3)	Apr 1, 2024	Apr 14, 2024	2	8
	(Australia) Matthew Ebden (2)	Apr 15, 2024	May 5, 2024	3	4
63	Marcel Granollers (ESP)	May 6, 2024	Jun 9, 2024	5	5
64	Horacio Zeballos (ARG)	May 6, 2024	Jun 9, 2024	5	5
	(Australia) Matthew Ebden (3)	Jun 10, 2024	Jul 14, 2024	5	9
	(Spain) Marcel Granollers (2)	Jul 15, 2024	Nov 10, 2024	17	22
	(Argentina) Horacio Zeballos (2)	Jul 15, 2024	Nov 10, 2024	17	22
65	Marcelo Arévalo (ESA)	Nov 11, 2024	Aug 17, 2025	40	40
	(Croatia) Mate Pavić (4)	Nov 11, 2024	Aug 17, 2025	40	97
66	Lloyd Glasspool (GBR)	Aug 18, 2025	Feb 1, 2026	24	24
	(United Kingdom) Neal Skupski (6)	Feb 2, 2026	Mar 29, 2026	8	43
	(Argentina) Horacio Zeballos (3)	Mar 30, 2026	Apr 5, 2026	1	23
	(United Kingdom) Neal Skupski (7)	Apr 6, 2026	Apr 19, 2026	2	45
	(Argentina) Horacio Zeballos (4)	Apr 20, 2026	May 3, 2026	2	25
	(United Kingdom) Neal Skupski (8)	May 4, 2026	Jun 7, 2026	5	50
67	Harri Heliövaara (FIN)	Jun 8, 2026	Present	24	24
68	Henry Patten (GBR)	Jun 8, 2026	Present	24	24

== Weeks at No. 1 ==
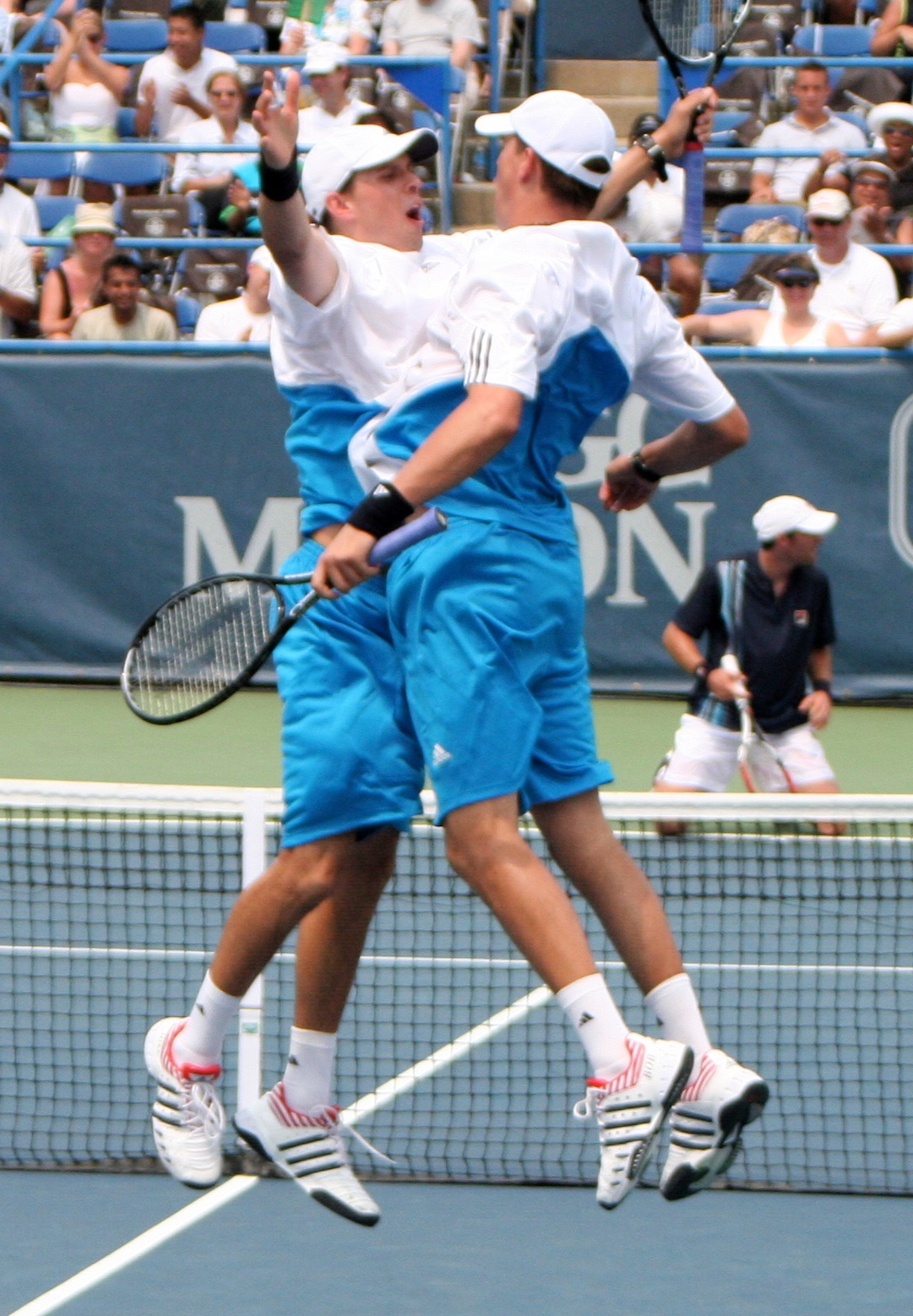
Mike and Bob Bryan were the most successful doubles tennis players of all time and they lead the tour in both total and consecutive weeks atop the rankings.

=== Total ===
No.	Player	Weeks
1.	(United States) Mike Bryan	506
2.	(United States) Bob Bryan	439
3.	(United States) John McEnroe	269
4.	(Australia) Todd Woodbridge	205
5.	(Canada) Daniel Nestor	108
6.	(Sweden) Anders Järryd	107
7.	(Croatia) Mate Pavić	97
8.	(South Africa) Frew McMillan	85
9.	(Australia) Mark Woodforde	83
10.	(Sweden) Jonas Björkman	74
11.	(Netherlands) Paul Haarhuis	70
12.	(Colombia) Robert Farah (Note: The ATP rankings were frozen from March 23 to August 23, 2020, due to the COVID-19 pandemic; thus, 22 weeks were not counted towards Farah's total.)	68
13.	(The Bahamas) Mark Knowles	65
14.	(Mexico) Raúl Ramírez	62
14.	(United States) Robert Seguso	62
14.	(Netherlands) Jacco Eltingh	62
17.	(Belarus) Max Mirnyi	57
18.	(Brazil) Marcelo Melo	56
19.	(United Kingdom) Neal Skupski	50
20.	(Serbia) Nenad Zimonjić	43
21.	(Australia) John Fitzgerald	40
21.	(El Salvador) Marcelo Arévalo	40
23.	(India) Leander Paes	39
23.	(France) Nicolas Mahut	39
25.	(Czechoslovakia) Tomáš Šmíd	34
25.	(Netherlands) Wesley Koolhof	34
27.	(Colombia) Juan Sebastián Cabal	29
28.	(South Africa) Danie Visser	27
29.	(United States) Jim Pugh	26
29.	(Finland) Henri Kontinen	26
29.	(United Kingdom) Joe Salisbury	26
29.	(United States) Austin Krajicek	26
33.	(United States) David Pate	25
33.	(Argentina) Horacio Zeballos	25
35.	(United Kingdom) Lloyd Glasspool	24
35.	(Finland) **Harri Heliövaara**	**24**
35.	(United Kingdom) **Henry Patten**	**24**
38.	(Spain) Marcel Granollers	22
39.	(United States) Donald Johnson	20
40.	(South Africa) Pieter Aldrich	19
40.	(France) Yannick Noah	19
40.	(Poland) Łukasz Kubot	19
43.	(United States) Peter Fleming	17
43.	(Canada) Grant Connell	17
43.	(United States) Jared Palmer	17
46.	(Sweden) Stefan Edberg	15
47.	(United States) Richey Reneberg	13
47.	(United States) Jim Grabb	13
47.	(Ecuador) Andrés Gómez	13
50.	(Netherlands) Tom Okker	11
51.	(United States) Rick Leach	9
51.	(United Kingdom) Jamie Murray	9
51.	(United States) Rajeev Ram	9
51.	(Australia) Matthew Ebden	9
55.	(Zimbabwe) Byron Black	8
55.	(United States) Stan Smith	8
55.	(India) Rohan Bopanna	8
58.	(Socialist Federal Republic of Yugoslavia) Slobodan Živojinović	7
59.	(United States) Jonathan Stark	6
59.	(Spain) Emilio Sánchez	6
59.	(South Africa) Bob Hewitt	6
62.	(United States) Alex O'Brien	5
62.	(United States) Ken Flach	5
64.	(India) Mahesh Bhupathi	4
64.	(United States) Patrick Galbraith	4
66.	(Australia) Paul McNamee	3
66.	(Croatia) Nikola Mektić	3
68.	(United States) Kelly Jones	1
*	active players; current No. 1(s) are in **bold**	

=== Consecutive ===
No.	Player	Weeks
1.	(United States) Mike Bryan	163
2.	(United States) Bob Bryan	140
3.	(Australia) Todd Woodbridge	125
4.	(United States) John McEnroe	108
5.	(United States) John McEnroe (2)	97
6.	(United States) Bob Bryan (2)	90
6.	(United States) Mike Bryan (2)	90
8.	(South Africa) Frew McMillan	80
9.	(Colombia) Robert Farah	68
10.	(United States) Bob Bryan (3)	64
10.	(United States) Mike Bryan (3)	64
10.	(United States) Bob Bryan (4)	64
10.	(United States) Mike Bryan (4)	64
14.	(Mexico) Raúl Ramírez	54
15.	(Australia) Mark Woodforde	52
15.	(United States) Mike Bryan (5)	52
17.	(Sweden) Anders Järryd	47
18.	(Netherlands) Jacco Eltingh	44
19.	(El Salvador) Marcelo Arévalo	40
19.	(Croatia) Mate Pavić	40
*	current streak in **bold**.	

== Year-end number 1 ==
The year-end No. 1 ranked player is determined based on the ATP rankings following the completion of the final tournament of the calendar year. For doubles, two rankings are maintained, one for the individual player or players with the most points, and one for the team with the most points at the end of the season.

=== By year ===
Year	Player	Team
1976	Raúl Ramírez (MEX)	not awarded
1977	Frew McMillan (RSA)	not awarded
1978^{*}	(South Africa) Frew McMillan (2)	not awarded
1979	John McEnroe (USA)	not awarded
1980^{*}	(United States) John McEnroe (2)	not awarded
1981	(United States) John McEnroe (3)	not awarded
1982	(United States) John McEnroe (4)	not awarded
1983^{*}	(United States) John McEnroe (5)	Peter Fleming (USA); John McEnroe (USA)
1984	Tomáš Šmíd (TCH)	Mark Edmondson (AUS); Sherwood Stewart (USA)
1985	Robert Seguso (USA)	Ken Flach (USA); Robert Seguso (USA)
1986	Andrés Gómez (ECU)	Hans Gildemeister (CHI); Andrés Gómez (ECU)
1987	(United States) Robert Seguso (2)	Sergio Casal (ESP); Emilio Sánchez (ESP)
1988	Anders Järryd (SWE)	Rick Leach (USA); Jim Pugh (USA)
1989	(Sweden) Anders Järryd (2)	(United States) Robert Leach (2) (United States) Jim Pugh (2)
1990	Pieter Aldrich (RSA); Danie Visser (RSA)	Pieter Aldrich (RSA); Danie Visser (RSA)
1991	John Fitzgerald (AUS)	John Fitzgerald (AUS); Anders Järryd (SWE)
1992	Mark Woodforde (AUS)	Todd Woodbridge (AUS); Mark Woodforde (AUS)
1993	Grant Connell (CAN)	Grant Connell (CAN); Patrick Galbraith (USA)
1994	Paul Haarhuis (NED)	Jacco Eltingh (NED); Paul Haarhuis (NED)
1995	Todd Woodbridge (AUS)	(Australia) Todd Woodbridge (2) (Australia) Mark Woodforde (2)
1996	(Australia) Todd Woodbridge (2) (Australia) Mark Woodforde (2)	(Australia) Todd Woodbridge (3) (Australia) Mark Woodforde (3)
1997	(Australia) Todd Woodbridge (3)	(Australia) Todd Woodbridge (4) (Australia) Mark Woodforde (4)
1998	Jacco Eltingh (NED)	(Netherlands) Jacco Eltingh (2) (Netherlands) Paul Haarhuis (2)
1999	Leander Paes (IND)	Mahesh Bhupathi (IND); Leander Paes (IND)
2000	(Australia) Mark Woodforde (3)	(Australia) Todd Woodbridge (5) (Australia) Mark Woodforde (5)
2001	Jonas Björkman (SWE)	Jonas Björkman (SWE) (Australia) Todd Woodbridge (6)
2002	Mark Knowles (BAH)	Mark Knowles (BAH); Daniel Nestor (CAN)
2003	Max Mirnyi (BLR)	Bob Bryan (USA); Mike Bryan (USA)
2004	(The Bahamas) Mark Knowles (2); Daniel Nestor (CAN)	(The Bahamas) Mark Knowles (2) (Canada) Daniel Nestor (2)

=== By year (continued) ===
Year	Player	Team
2005	Bob Bryan (USA); Mike Bryan (USA)	(United States) Bob Bryan (2) (United States) Mike Bryan (2)
2006^{*}	(United States) Bob Bryan (2) (United States) Mike Bryan (2)	(United States) Bob Bryan (3) (United States) Mike Bryan (3)
2007	(United States) Bob Bryan (3) (United States) Mike Bryan (3)	(United States) Bob Bryan (4) (United States) Mike Bryan (4)
2008	Nenad Zimonjić (SRB)	(Canada) Daniel Nestor (3); Nenad Zimonjić (SRB)
2009	(United States) Bob Bryan (4) (United States) Mike Bryan (4)	(United States) Bob Bryan (5) (United States) Mike Bryan (5)
2010	(United States) Bob Bryan (5) (United States) Mike Bryan (5)	(United States) Bob Bryan (6) (United States) Mike Bryan (6)
2011^{*}	(United States) Bob Bryan (6) (United States) Mike Bryan (6)	(United States) Bob Bryan (7) (United States) Mike Bryan (7)
2012	(United States) Mike Bryan (7)	(United States) Bob Bryan (8) (United States) Mike Bryan (8)
2013^{*}	(United States) Bob Bryan (7) (United States) Mike Bryan (8)	(United States) Bob Bryan (9) (United States) Mike Bryan (9)
2014^{*}	(United States) Bob Bryan (8) (United States) Mike Bryan (9)	(United States) Bob Bryan (10) (United States) Mike Bryan (10)
2015	Marcelo Melo (BRA)	Jean-Julien Rojer (NED); Horia Tecău (ROU)
2016	Nicolas Mahut (FRA)	Jamie Murray (GBR); Bruno Soares (BRA)
2017	(Brazil) Marcelo Melo (2)	Łukasz Kubot (POL); Marcelo Melo (BRA)
2018	(United States) Mike Bryan (10)	Oliver Marach (AUT); Mate Pavić (CRO)
2019	Juan Sebastián Cabal (COL); Robert Farah (COL)	Juan Sebastián Cabal (COL); Robert Farah (COL)
2020^{*}	(Colombia) Robert Farah (2)	(Croatia) Mate Pavić (2) (Brazil) Bruno Soares (2)
2021	Mate Pavić (CRO)	Nikola Mektić (CRO) (Croatia) Mate Pavić (3)
2022	Wesley Koolhof (NED); Neal Skupski (GBR)	Wesley Koolhof (NED); Neal Skupski (GBR)
2023	Austin Krajicek (USA)	Ivan Dodig (CRO); Austin Krajicek (USA)
2024	Marcelo Arévalo (ESA) (Croatia) Mate Pavić (2)	Marcelo Arévalo (ESA) (Croatia) Mate Pavić (4)
2025	Lloyd Glasspool (GBR)	Julian Cash (GBR); Lloyd Glasspool (GBR)
2026	Harri Heliövaara (FIN); Henry Patten (GBR)	Harri Heliövaara (FIN); Henry Patten (GBR)

*	Player(s) ranked No. 1 throughout the calendar year.

=== Per player ===
No.	Total
10	(United States) Mike Bryan
8	(United States) Bob Bryan
5	(United States) John McEnroe
3	(Australia) Mark Woodforde
3	(Australia) Todd Woodbridge
2	(South Africa) Frew McMillan
2	(United States) Robert Seguso
2	(Sweden) Anders Järryd
2	(The Bahamas) Mark Knowles
2	(Brazil) Marcelo Melo
2	(Colombia) Robert Farah
2	(Croatia) Mate Pavić

=== Per team ===
No.	Total
10	(United States) Bob Bryan (United States) Mike Bryan
5	(Australia) Todd Woodbridge (Australia) Mark Woodforde
2	(United States) Rick Leach (United States) Jim Pugh
2	(Netherlands) Jacco Eltingh (Netherlands) Paul Haarhuis
2	(The Bahamas) Mark Knowles (Canada) Daniel Nestor

== Players who became No. 1 without having won a Grand Slam ==
Player	First ranked No. 1	First Grand Slam final	First Grand Slam title
(Sweden) Stefan Edberg	June 9, 1986	1984 US Open (1st of 5)	1987 Australian Open (1st of 3)
(United States) David Pate	January 14, 1991	1991 Australian Open (1st of 2)	1991 Australian Open (only title)
(United States) Kelly Jones	October 12, 1992	1992 Australian Open (1st of 2)	none (retired in 1998)
(United States) Patrick Galbraith	October 18, 1993	1993 Wimbledon (1st of 2)	none (retired in 1999)
(Canada) Grant Connell	November 15, 1993	1990 Australian Open (1st of 4)	none (retired in 1997)
(Zimbabwe) Byron Black	February 14, 1994	1994 Australian Open (1st of 4)	1994 French Open (only title)
(Netherlands) Wesley Koolhof	November 7, 2022	2020 US Open (1st of 3)	2023 Wimbledon (only title)
(United Kingdom) Neal Skupski	November 14, 2022	2022 US Open (1st of 6)	2023 Wimbledon (1st of 3)
(Spain) Marcel Granollers	May 6, 2024	2014 French Open (1st of 8)	2025 French Open (1st of 3)
(Argentina) Horacio Zeballos	May 6, 2024	2019 US Open (1st of 6)	2025 French Open (1st of 3)

== Weeks at No. 1 by decade ==
- Note: Current No. 1 player indicated in italic.

=== 1970s* ===
- — Starting in 1976

85	McMillan

62	Ramírez

37	McEnroe

11	Okker

6	Hewitt

=== 1980s ===
232	McEnroe

87	Järryd

62	Seguso

34	Šmíd

19	Noah

17	Fleming

15	Edberg

13	Gómez

12	Pugh

8	Smith

7	Živojinović

6	Sánchez

5	Flach

3	McNamee

1	Grabb

=== 1990s ===
159	Woodbridge

73	Woodforde

70	Haarhuis

62	Eltingh

40	Fitzgerald

28	Paes

27	Visser

25	Pate

20	Järryd

20	Seguso

19	Aldrich

17	Connell

14	Pugh

13	Reneberg

12	Grabb

9	Eltingh

9	Leach

8	Black

6	Stark

4	Bhupathi

4	Galbraith

1	Jones

=== 2000s ===
194	B. Bryan

194	M. Bryan

74	Björkman

65	Knowles

65	Nestor

46	Woodbridge

39	Mirnyi

20	Johnson

18	Zimonjić

17	Palmer

11	Paes

5	O'Brien

=== 2010s ===
312	M. Bryan

245	B. Bryan

56	Melo

43	Nestor

39	Mahut

26	Kontinen

25	Cabal

25	Farah

25	Zimonjić

19	Kubot

18	Mirnyi

9	Murray

8	Pavić

=== 2020s ===
89	Pavić

50	Skupski

43	Farah

40	Arévalo

34	Koolhof

26	Krajicek

26	Salisbury

25	Zeballos

24	Glasspool

24	Heliövaara

24	Patten

22	Granollers

9	Ebden

9	Ram

8	Bopanna

3	Mektić

- Stats are automatically updated on Mondays (UTC).

== Weeks at number 1 by country ==
- Current No. 1 player(s) indicated in **bold**.

Weeks	Country	Players
1474	United States	John McEnroe, Stan Smith, Peter Fleming, Robert Seguso, Ken Flach, Jim Grabb, Jim Pugh, Rick Leach, David Pate, Kelly Jones, Richey Reneberg, Patrick Galbraith, Jonathan Stark, Jared Palmer, Alex O'Brien, Donald Johnson, Bob Bryan, Mike Bryan, Rajeev Ram, Austin Krajicek
339	Australia	Paul McNamee, John Fitzgerald, Todd Woodbridge, Mark Woodforde, Matthew Ebden
196	Sweden	Anders Järryd, Stefan Edberg, Jonas Björkman
179	Netherlands	Tom Okker, Paul Haarhuis, Jacco Eltingh, Wesley Koolhof
137	South Africa	Bob Hewitt, Frew McMillan, Danie Visser, Pieter Aldrich
**133**	**Great Britain**	Jamie Murray, Joe Salisbury, Neal Skupski, Lloyd Glasspool, **Henry Patten**
125	Canada	Grant Connell, Daniel Nestor
100	Croatia	Mate Pavić, Nikola Mektić
97	Colombia	Juan Sebastián Cabal, Robert Farah
62	Mexico	Raúl Ramírez
65	Bahamas	Mark Knowles
58	France	Yannick Noah, Nicolas Mahut
57	Belarus	Max Mirnyi
56	Brazil	Marcelo Melo
51	India	Mahesh Bhupathi, Leander Paes, Rohan Bopanna
**50**	**Finland**	Henri Kontinen, **Harri Heliövaara**
50	Serbia	Slobodan Živojinović, Nenad Zimonjić
40	El Salvador	Marcelo Arévalo
34	Czechoslovakia	Tomáš Šmíd
28	Spain	Emilio Sánchez, Marcel Granollers
25	Argentina	Horacio Zeballos
19	Poland	Łukasz Kubot
13	Ecuador	Andrés Gómez
8	Zimbabwe	Byron Black

Weeks are updated automatically.

== See also ==
- List of ATP number 1 ranked singles tennis players
- List of WTA number 1 ranked singles tennis players
- List of WTA number 1 ranked doubles tennis players
- ITF World Champions
- Current ATP rankings
- List of highest ranked tennis players per country
- List of male doubles tennis players
