= John Arbanas =

Australian tennis player

- Full name: John Arbanas
- Country (sports): Australia
- Born: 7 February 1970 (age 56)

Singles
- Career record: 0–1
- Highest ranking: No. 640 (28 January 1991)

Grand Slam singles results
- Australian Open: 1R (1991)

John Arbanas (born 7 February 1970) is an Australian former professional tennis player.

Arbanas, a Victorian, played mostly in satellite tournaments, but is notable for featuring in the main draw as a qualifier at the 1991 Australian Open. He had qualifying wins over Tim Wilkison, Mark Hopkins and Glenn Layendecker, then was beaten in the first round of the main draw by Brazilian player Jaime Oncins.
