= Scott Patridge =

American tennis player

- Full name: Scott Coleman Patridge
- Country (sports): United States
- Born: August 31, 1965 (age 59); Newport Beach, California, United States
- Plays: Right-handed
- Prize money: $66,388

Singles
- Highest ranking: No. 200 (May 20, 1991)

Doubles
- Career record: 8–21
- Career titles: 0
- Highest ranking: No. 105 (April 22, 1991)

Grand Slam doubles results
- Australian Open: 1R (1991, 1992)
- French Open: 1R (1991)
- Wimbledon: 2R (1991)
- US Open: 1R (1991)

Scott Coleman Patridge (born 31 August 1965) is a former professional tennis player from the United States.

== Biography ==
=== Early life and college ===
Scott Patridge was born in Newport Beach, California, the second son of Joe and Ginny. He went to Saratoga High School. While at the University of San Diego (USD) he played collegiate tennis and formed a strong doubles partnership with David Stewart. The pair won 48 matches from 1986 to 1988, which set a USD record. He turned professional after graduating with a business degree.

=== Professional tour ===
In 1991 and 1992 he competed on the ATP Tour as a doubles specialist. His best performance was a semi-final appearance at Itaparica with Canadian Martin Laurendeau in 1990. He played in the main draw of all four Grand Slam tournaments in 1991, all with different partners. At the 1991 Wimbledon Championships he and partner Joey Rive made the second round. As a singles player he made it to 200 in the world, through his participation in Challenger tournaments. He won three doubles titles on the Challenger circuit.

== Challenger titles ==
=== Doubles: (3) ===
No.	Year	Tournament	Surface	Partner	Opponents	Score
1.	1990	Pretoria, South Africa	Hard	(United States) Mark Keil	(South Africa) Stefan Kruger (United States) Greg Van Emburgh	6–7, 6–4, 6–4
2.	1990	Azores, Portugal	Hard	(South Africa) Brent Haygarth	(United Kingdom) Andrew Castle (Nigeria) Nduka Odizor	6–7, 7–6, 6–3
3.	1991	Benin City, Nigeria	Hard	(United States) Mark Keil	(United States) T. J. Middleton (United States) Ted Scherman	7–5, 6–7, 7–5
