= Stacey Schefflin =

American tennis player

- Full name: Stacey Schefflin
- Country (sports): United States
- Born: March 19, 1968 (age 57)
- Prize money: $38,338

Singles
- Highest ranking: No. 165 (January 28, 1991)

Grand Slam singles results
- Australian Open: 3R (1991)

Doubles
- Highest ranking: No. 242 (August 17, 1992)

Stacey Schefflin (born March 19, 1968) is a former professional tennis player from the United States.

== Biography ==
Schefflin, who comes from Charlotte, North Carolina, played collegiate tennis at the University of Georgia and was a member of the team which finished runner-up to Stanford in the 1987 NCAA Championships.

From 1990 to 1992 she competed on the professional tour, reaching a best ranking of 165 in the world. Most notably she made the third round of the 1991 Australian Open, beating Miriam Oremans and Tamaka Takagi en route, after winning her way through qualifying.

She represented the United States at the 1993 Maccabiah Games.
