= 1991 Australian Open – Mixed doubles =

Mixed doubles
- 1991 Australian Open

Final
- Champions: (United Kingdom) Jo Durie (United Kingdom) Jeremy Bates
- Runners-up: (United States) Robin White (United States) Scott Davis
- Score: 2–6, 6–4, 6–4

Details
- Draw: 32
- Seeds: 8

Events
Singles	men	women		boys	girls
Doubles	men	women	mixed	boys	girls
WC Singles	men	women	quad
WC Doubles	men	women	quad
Legends	men	women	mixed
- Australian Open

Natasha Zvereva and Jim Pugh were the defending champions but lost in the quarterfinals to Pam Shriver and Mark Kratzmann.

Jo Durie and Jeremy Bates won in the final 2–6, 6–4, 6–4 against Robin White and Scott Davis.

== Seeds ==
Champion seeds are indicated in bold text while text in italics indicates the round in which those seeds were eliminated.

1. (Soviet Union) Natasha Zvereva / (United States) Jim Pugh (quarterfinals)
2. (United States) Zina Garrison / (United States) Rick Leach (first round)
3. (United States) Robin White / (United States) Scott Davis (final)
4. (United States) Patty Fendick / (United States) Patrick Galbraith (second round)
5. (South Africa) Elna Reinach / (United Kingdom) Neil Broad (first round)
6. (Canada) Jill Hetherington / (Canada) Glenn Michibata (second round)
7. (Soviet Union) Natalia Medvedeva / (United States) Kelly Jones (first round)
8. (Australia) Nicole Provis / (Australia) Todd Woodbridge (second round)

== Draw ==
Key

- Q = Qualifier
- WC = Wild card
- LL = Lucky loser
- Alt = Alternate
- ITF = ITF entry
- PR = Protected ranking
- SR = Special ranking
- SE = Special exempt
- JE = Junior exempt
- JR = Junior Accelerator Programme entrant
- CO = College Accelerator Programme entrant
- NG = Next Gen Accelerator Program entrant
- w/o = Walkover
- r = Retired
- d = Defaulted

=== Final ===
Final
	(United Kingdom) **Jo Durie** (United Kingdom) **Jeremy Bates**	2	**6**	**6**
3	(United States) Robin White (United States) Scott Davis	**6**	4	4

=== Top half ===
First round
1	(Soviet Union) **N Zvereva** (United States) **J Pugh**	**7**	**7^{7}**
(United States) E Burgin (Australia) L Warder	5	6^{5}
(Czechoslovakia) H Suková (Czechoslovakia) C Suk	6^{5}	3
WC	(Germany) **S Graf** (Australia) **M Woodforde**	**7^{7}**	**6**
(Soviet Union) L Savchenko (Belgium) L Pimek	**6**	4	6
WC	(United States) **P Shriver** (Australia) **M Kratzmann**	2	**6**	**8**
(New Zealand) B Cordwell (United States) S DeVries	3	4
8	(Australia) **N Provis** (Australia) **T Woodbridge**	**6**	**6**
4	(United States) **P Fendick** (United States) **P Galbraith**	**6**	**7^{7}**
(United States) G Magers (United States) K Kinnear	4	6^{5}
(United States) A Smith (United States) G Van Emburgh	3	2
(Argentina) **M Paz** (Argentina) **C Miniussi**	**6**	**6**
(United Kingdom) **J Durie** (United Kingdom) **J Bates**	6^{5}	**7**	**8**
(United States) R Fairbank-Nideffer (The Bahamas) R Smith	**7^{7}**	5	6
(Argentina) P Tarabini (Argentina) J Frana	3	2
6	(Canada) **J Hetherington** (Canada) **G Michibata**	**6**	**6**

Second round
1	(Soviet Union) **N Zvereva** (United States) **J Pugh**	**6**	**6**
WC	(Germany) S Graf (Australia) M Woodforde	3	2
WC	(United States) **P Shriver** (Australia) **M Kratzmann**	**6**	**6**
8	(Australia) N Provis (Australia) T Woodbridge	4	4
4	(United States) P Fendick (United States) P Galbraith	4	**7^{7}**	2
(Argentina) **M Paz** (Argentina) **C Miniussi**	**6**	6^{5}	**6**
(United Kingdom) **J Durie** (United Kingdom) **J Bates**	**6**	**7**
6	(Canada) J Hetherington (Canada) G Michibata	4	5

Quarterfinals
1	(Soviet Union) N Zvereva (United States) J Pugh	6^{3}	4
WC	(United States) **P Shriver** (Australia) **M Kratzmann**	**7^{7}**	**6**
(Argentina) M Paz (Argentina) C Miniussi	3	6^{4}
(United Kingdom) **J Durie** (United Kingdom) **J Bates**	**6**	**7^{7}**

Semifinals
WC	(United States) P Shriver (Australia) M Kratzmann	5	4
(United Kingdom) **J Durie** (United Kingdom) **J Bates**	**7**	**6**

=== Bottom half ===
First round
5	(South Africa) E Reinach (United Kingdom) N Broad	**6**	3	4
(United States) **C MacGregor** (United States) **R Van't Hof**	1	**6**	**6**
(United States) **K Jordan** (United States) **B Shelton**	**6**	**7**
(United States) L McNeil (Nigeria) N Odizor	4	5
(New Zealand) J Richardson (Australia) D Macpherson	6^{3}	3
(United States) **S Collins** (United States) **T Witsken**	**7^{7}**	**6**
(Italy) R Reggi (United Kingdom) A Castle	2	4
3	(United States) **R White** (United States) **S Davis**	**6**	**6**
7	(Soviet Union) N Medvedeva (United States) K Jones	4	**6**	4
(Australia) **M Jaggard** (Australia) **B Dyke**	**6**	4	**6**
(Australia) **R McQuillan** (New Zealand) **K Evernden**	**6**	6^{2}	**6**
(Germany) E Pfaff (United States) S Salumaa	4	**7^{7}**	3
(Australia) **E Smylie** (Australia) **J Fitzgerald**	**6**	**7**
(Netherlands) M Bollegraf (Netherlands) T Nijssen	3	5
(South Africa) **L Gregory** (South Africa) **S Kruger**	**7**	**6**
2	(United States) Z Garrison (United States) R Leach	5	2

Second round
(United States) **C MacGregor** (United States) **R Van't Hof**	**7**	**6**
(United States) K Jordan (United States) B Shelton	5	2
(United States) S Collins (United States) T Witsken	**6**	6^{5}	4
3	(United States) **R White** (United States) **S Davis**	4	**7^{7}**	**6**
(Australia) M Jaggard (Australia) B Dyke	4	**6**	1
(Australia) **R McQuillan** (New Zealand) **K Evernden**	**6**	3	**6**
(Australia) **E Smylie** (Australia) **J Fitzgerald**	**6**	**7**
(South Africa) L Gregory (South Africa) S Kruger	1	5

Quarterfinals
(United States) C MacGregor (United States) R Van't Hof	4	4
3	(United States) **R White** (United States) **S Davis**	**6**	**6**
(Australia) R McQuillan (New Zealand) K Evernden	4	2
2	(Australia) **E Smylie** (Australia) **J Fitzgerald**	**6**	**6**

Semifinals
3	(United States) **R White** (United States) **S Davis**	**6**	5	**8**
(Australia) E Smylie (Australia) J Fitzgerald	4	**7**	6
