= 1991 Australian Open – Men's doubles =

Tennis tournament

Men's doubles
- 1991 Australian Open

Final
- Champion: (United States) Scott Davis (United States) David Pate
- Runner-up: (United States) Patrick McEnroe (United States) David Wheaton
- Score: 6–7, 7–6, 6–3, 7–5

Details
- Draw: 64
- Seeds: 16

Events
Singles	men	women		boys	girls
Doubles	men	women	mixed	boys	girls
WC Singles	men	women	quad
WC Doubles	men	women	quad
Legends	men	women	mixed
- Australian Open

Pieter Aldrich and Danie Visser were the defending champions, but lost in the first round to Paul Haarhuis and Mark Koevermans.
Scott Davis and David Pate won the title, defeating Patrick McEnroe and David Wheaton 6–7, 7–6, 6–3, 7–5 in the final. This was Pate's first Grand Slam title and final, despite gaining the World No. 1 ranking two weeks earlier.
John Fitzgerald and Anders Järryd lost in the third round to McEnroe and Wheaton. It was their only Grand Slam loss of the year, as they won the other three majors in 1991.

== Seeds ==
1. (South Africa) Pieter Aldrich / (South Africa) Danie Visser (first round)
2. (United States) Rick Leach / (United States) Jim Pugh (third round)
3. (United States) Scott Davis / (United States) David Pate (champions)
4. (France) Guy Forget / (Switzerland) Jakob Hlasek (first round)
5. (Canada) Grant Connell / (Canada) Glenn Michibata (first round)
6. (Spain) Sergio Casal / (Spain) Emilio Sánchez (first round)
7. (Australia) Darren Cahill / (Australia) Mark Kratzmann (third round)
8. (United Kingdom) Neil Broad / (South Africa) Gary Muller (third round)
9. (United States) Patrick Galbraith / (United States) Todd Witsken (second round)
10. (Socialist Federal Republic of Yugoslavia) Goran Ivanišević / (Czechoslovakia) Petr Korda (first round)
11. (Germany) Udo Riglewski / (Germany) Michael Stich (quarterfinals)
12. (Australia) Broderick Dyke / (Sweden) Peter Lundgren (second round)
13. (United States) Patrick McEnroe / (United States) David Wheaton (final)
14. (Italy) Omar Camporese / (Spain) Javier Sánchez (first round)
15. (Australia) Wally Masur / (Australia) Jason Stoltenberg (quarterfinals)
16. (United Kingdom) Jeremy Bates / (United States) Kelly Jones (semifinals)

== Draw ==
Key

- Q = Qualifier
- WC = Wild card
- LL = Lucky loser
- Alt = Alternate
- ITF = ITF entry
- PR = Protected ranking
- SR = Special ranking
- SE = Special exempt
- JE = Junior exempt
- JR = Junior Accelerator Programme entrant
- CO = College Accelerator Programme entrant
- NG = Next Gen Accelerator Program entrant
- w/o = Walkover
- r = Retired
- d = Defaulted

=== Finals ===
Quarterfinals
16	(United Kingdom) Jeremy Bates (United States) Kelly Jones	6	6	6
(United Kingdom) Nick Brown (Netherlands) Menno Oosting	3	4	4
3	(United States) Scott Davis (United States) David Pate	4	4	6	6	8
(United States) Brian Garrow (United States) Brad Pearce	6	6	3	3	6
11	(Germany) Udo Riglewski (Germany) Michael Stich	6	3	6	3
13	(United States) Patrick McEnroe (United States) David Wheaton	7	6	3	6
(Australia) Todd Woodbridge (Australia) Mark Woodforde	7	3	6	6
15	(Australia) Wally Masur (Australia) Jason Stoltenberg	6	6	3	1

Semifinals
16	(United Kingdom) Jeremy Bates (United States) Kelly Jones	1	6	4	7	7
3	(United States) Scott Davis (United States) David Pate	6	4	6	5	9
13	(United States) Patrick McEnroe (United States) David Wheaton	7	6	6
(Australia) Todd Woodbridge (Australia) Mark Woodforde	5	4	1

Final
3	(United States) Scott Davis (United States) David Pate	6	7	6	7
13	(United States) Patrick McEnroe (United States) David Wheaton	7	6	3	5

=== Top half ===
==== Section 1 ====
First round
1	(South Africa) P Aldrich (South Africa) D Visser	6	6
(Netherlands) P Haarhuis (Netherlands) M Koevermans	7	7
(New Zealand) K Evernden (Venezuela) N Pereira	7	6
WC	(Australia) J Anderson (Sweden) L-A Wahlgren	6	4
(Australia) P Doohan (Australia) L Warder	6	6
(Portugal) J Cunha e Silva (Belgium) E Masso	3	4
(Venezuela) A González Mora (United States) B Page	6	2
16	(United Kingdom) J Bates (United States) K Jones	7	6
10	(Socialist Federal Republic of Yugoslavia) G Ivanišević (Czechoslovakia) P Korda	1	7	3
(United Kingdom) N Brown (Netherlands) M Oosting	6	5	6
(United States) K Kinnear (United States) B Shelton	6	7
(Soviet Union) A Cherkasov (Socialist Federal Republic of Yugoslavia) S Živojinović	3	6
WC	(Australia) G Doyle (Australia) C Eagle	7	6
(Argentina) M Jaite (Uruguay) D Pérez	6	4
(South Africa) S Kruger (South Africa) C van Rensburg	1	6
8	(United Kingdom) N Broad (South Africa) G Muller	6	7

Second round
(Netherlands) P Haarhuis (Netherlands) M Koevermans	3	6	6
(New Zealand) K Evernden (Venezuela) N Pereira	6	4	3
(Australia) P Doohan (Australia) L Warder	2	6
16	(United Kingdom) J Bates (United States) K Jones	6	7
(United Kingdom) N Brown (Netherlands) M Oosting	6	2	8
(United States) K Kinnear (United States) B Shelton	3	6	6
WC	(Australia) G Doyle (Australia) C Eagle	3	1
8	(United Kingdom) N Broad (South Africa) G Muller	6	6

Third round
(Netherlands) P Haarhuis (Netherlands) M Koevermans	4	2
16	(United Kingdom) J Bates (United States) K Jones	6	6
(United Kingdom) N Brown (Netherlands) M Oosting	6	7	6
8	(United Kingdom) N Broad (South Africa) G Muller	7	6	3

Quarterfinals
16	(United Kingdom) J Bates (United States) K Jones	6	6	6
(United Kingdom) N Brown (Netherlands) M Oosting	3	4	4

==== Section 2 ====
First round
3	(United States) S Davis (United States) D Pate	7	7
(Sweden) P Henricsson (Sweden) N Utgren	6	5
(United States) S DeVries (Australia) D Macpherson	7	6
(Australia) N Borwick (New Zealand) D Lewis	5	3
(United States) C Beckman (United States) S Cannon	6	6
(Nigeria) N Odizor (United States) T Wilkison	3	2
(United States) J Brown (United States) S Salumaa	2	7	6
14	(Italy) O Camporese (Spain) J Sánchez	6	6	3
12	(Australia) B Dyke (Sweden) P Lundgren	6	6
(Italy) C Caratti (Italy) F Mordegan	2	2
(Germany) B Becker (Germany) P Kühnen	6	6
(Czechoslovakia) V Flégl (Czechoslovakia) D Vacek	3	0
(United States) J Canter (New Zealand) B Derlin	6	2
(United States) B Garrow (United States) B Pearce	7	6
(Italy) G Pozzi (United States) D Rostagno	7	2	8
6	(Spain) S Casal (Spain) E Sánchez	6	6	6

Second round
3	(United States) S Davis (United States) D Pate	6	7
(United States) S DeVries (Australia) D Macpherson	2	5
(United States) C Beckman (United States) S Cannon	7	6	4
(United States) J Brown (United States) S Salumaa	5	7	6
12	(Australia) B Dyke (Sweden) P Lundgren	6	3	5
(Germany) B Becker (Germany) P Kühnen	4	6	7
(United States) B Garrow (United States) B Pearce	6	6
(Italy) G Pozzi (United States) D Rostagno	1	4

Third round
3	(United States) S Davis (United States) D Pate	7	6
(United States) J Brown (United States) S Salumaa	5	3
(Germany) B Becker (Germany) P Kühnen	3	6	6
(United States) B Garrow (United States) B Pearce	6	4	8

Quarterfinals
3	(United States) S Davis (United States) D Pate	4	4	6	6	8
(United States) B Garrow (United States) B Pearce	6	6	3	3	6

=== Bottom half ===
==== Section 3 ====
First round
5	(Canada) G Connell (Canada) G Michibata	6	6
(United States) G Van Emburgh (Australia) S Youl	3	2
(Argentina) G Luza (Switzerland) M Rosset	6	6
(United Kingdom) A Castle (The Bahamas) R Smith	4	1
WC	(Australia) W Arthurs (Australia) C Limberger	4	4
(Czechoslovakia) K Nováček (Belgium) L Pimek	6	6
(Netherlands) M Schapers (Netherlands) J Siemerink	2	4
11	(Germany) U Riglewski (Germany) M Stich	6	6
13	(United States) P McEnroe (United States) D Wheaton	6	6
(Sweden) D Engel (Germany) M Sinner	2	1
(Sweden) S Edberg (New Zealand) S Guy	6	3
(United States) J Arias (United States) G Layendecker	7	6
WC	(Australia) R Fromberg (Australia) S Stolle	6	7
WC	(Hong Kong) M Brown (Australia) A Kratzmann	2	6
(Australia) J Fitzgerald (Sweden) A Järryd	1	7	6
4	(France) G Forget (Switzerland) J Hlasek	6	6	3

Second round
5	(Canada) G Connell (Canada) G Michibata	6	7
(Argentina) G Luza (Switzerland) M Rosset	1	6
(Czechoslovakia) K Nováček (Belgium) L Pimek	1	4
11	(Germany) U Riglewski (Germany) M Stich	6	6
13	(United States) P McEnroe (United States) D Wheaton	6	6
(United States) J Arias (United States) G Layendecker	4	4
WC	(Australia) R Fromberg (Australia) S Stolle	6	6	3
(Australia) J Fitzgerald (Sweden) A Järryd	7	3	6

Third round
5	(Canada) G Connell (Canada) G Michibata	7	3	5
11	(Germany) U Riglewski (Germany) M Stich	5	6	7
13	(United States) P McEnroe (United States) D Wheaton	6	3	6
(Australia) J Fitzgerald (Sweden) A Järryd	4	6	2

Quarterfinals
11	(Germany) U Riglewski (Germany) M Stich	6	3	6	3
13	(United States) P McEnroe (United States) D Wheaton	7	6	3	6

==== Section 4 ====
First round
7	(Australia) D Cahill (Australia) M Kratzmann	6	6
(United States) B Garnett (United States) S Patridge	4	3
(Mexico) L Herrera (Mexico) L Lavalle	3	3
(Israel) G Bloom (Spain) F Clavet	6	6
(Austria) A Antonitsch (Netherlands) T Nijssen	2	2
(Australia) T Woodbridge (Australia) M Woodforde	6	6
(Netherlands) J Eltingh (South Africa) W Ferreira	4	4
9	(United States) P Galbraith (United States) T Witsken	6	6
15	(Australia) W Masur (Australia) J Stoltenberg	6	6
(France) J-P Fleurian (United States) R Van't Hof	4	1
(United States) M Davis (Australia) B Drewett	6	4
(Argentina) J Frana (Argentina) C Miniussi	7	6
(Sweden) J Gunnarsson (Germany) A Mronz	1	4
(Netherlands) R Krajicek (Czechoslovakia) C Suk	6	6
(Italy) P Canè (Socialist Federal Republic of Yugoslavia) G Prpić	3	4
2	(United States) R Leach (United States) J Pugh	6	6

Second round
7	(Australia) D Cahill (Australia) M Kratzmann	6	5	6
(Israel) G Bloom (Spain) F Clavet	3	7	2
(Australia) T Woodbridge (Australia) M Woodforde	6	2	6
9	(United States) P Galbraith (United States) T Witsken	3	6	3
15	(Australia) W Masur (Australia) J Stoltenberg	7	1	8
(Argentina) J Frana (Argentina) C Miniussi	6	6	6
(Netherlands) R Krajicek (Czechoslovakia) C Suk	6	4
2	(United States) R Leach (United States) J Pugh	7	6

Third round
7	(Australia) D Cahill (Australia) M Kratzmann	6	4
(Australia) T Woodbridge (Australia) M Woodforde	7	6
15	(Australia) W Masur (Australia) J Stoltenberg	6	4	6
2	(United States) R Leach (United States) J Pugh	3	6	4

Quarterfinals
(Australia) T Woodbridge (Australia) M Woodforde	7	3	6	6
15	(Australia) W Masur (Australia) J Stoltenberg	6	6	3	1
