= 1991 Australian Open – Women's singles =

Women's singles
- 1991 Australian Open

Final
- Champion: (Socialist Federal Republic of Yugoslavia) Monica Seles
- Runner-up: (Czechoslovakia) Jana Novotná
- Score: 5–7, 6–3, 6–1

Details
- Draw: 128
- Seeds: 16

Events
| Singles | men | women | | boys | girls |
| Doubles | men | women | mixed | boys | girls |
| WC Singles | men | women | quad |
| WC Doubles | men | women | quad |
| Legends | men | women | mixed |
- Australian Open

Monica Seles defeated Jana Novotná in the final, 5–7, 6–3, 6–1 to win the women's singles tennis title at the 1991 Australian Open. It was her first Australian Open title and second major title overall. Seles saved a match point en route to the title, in the semifinals against Mary Joe Fernández. Seles was making her tournament debut.

Steffi Graf was the three-time defending champion, but lost to Novotná in the quarterfinals.

== Seeds ==
The seeded players are listed below. Monica Seles is the champion; others show the round in which they were eliminated.

1. (Germany) Steffi Graf (quarterfinals)
2. (Socialist Federal Republic of Yugoslavia) Monica Seles (champion)
3. (United States) Mary Joe Fernández (semifinals)
4. (Argentina) Gabriela Sabatini (quarterfinals)
5. (Bulgaria) Katerina Maleeva (quarterfinals)
6. (Spain) Arantxa Sánchez Vicario (semifinals)
7. (Switzerland) Manuela Maleeva (second round)
8. (United States) Zina Garrison (fourth round)
9. (Czechoslovakia) Helena Suková (third round)
10. (Czechoslovakia) Jana Novotná (finalist)
11. (Soviet Union) Natasha Zvereva (fourth round)
12. (Austria) Barbara Paulus (second round)
13. (United States) Amy Frazier (fourth round)
14. (South Africa) Rosalyn Fairbank-Nideffer (third round)
15. (Peru) Laura Gildemeister (second round)
16. (Belgium) Sabine Appelmans (fourth round)

== Draw ==
=== Key ===
- Q = Qualifier
- WC = Wild card
- LL = Lucky loser
- r = Retired

=== Finals ===
Quarterfinals
1 | (Germany) Steffi Graf | 7 | 4 | 6
10 | (Czechoslovakia) Jana Novotná | 5 | 6 | 8
4 | (Argentina) Gabriela Sabatini | 1 | 3
6 | (Spain) Arantxa Sánchez Vicario | 6 | 6
5 | (Bulgaria) Katerina Maleeva | 3 | 2
3 | (United States) Mary Joe Fernández | 6 | 6
(Germany) Anke Huber | 3 | 1
2 | (Socialist Federal Republic of Yugoslavia) Monica Seles | 6 | 6

Semifinals
10 | (Czechoslovakia) Jana Novotná | 6 | 6
6 | (Spain) Arantxa Sánchez Vicario | 2 | 4
3 | (United States) Mary Joe Fernández | 3 | 6 | 7
2 | (Socialist Federal Republic of Yugoslavia) Monica Seles | 6 | 0 | 9

Finals
10 | (Czechoslovakia) Jana Novotná | 7 | 3 | 1
2 | (Socialist Federal Republic of Yugoslavia) Monica Seles | 5 | 6 | 6

=== Earlier rounds ===
==== Section 1 ====
First round
1 | (Germany) S Graf | 6 | 6
(United States) J Santrock | 3 | 0
(Japan) M Kidowaki | 1 | 6 | 6
(Australia) K Sharpe | 6 | 1 | 4
(Japan) K Date | 6 | 6
(France) N Herreman | 2 | 1
(Australia) N Provis | 6 | 6
(South Africa) E Reinach | 2 | 0
(Czechoslovakia) K Habšudová | 6 | 7^{7}
(Argentina) C Tessi | 2 | 6^{5}
(United States) A Smith | 6 | 6
(Czechoslovakia) E Švíglerová | 3 | 4
(Australia) E Smylie | 2 | 6 | 6
(Germany) C Kohde-Kilsch | 6 | 4 | 4
(Peru) P Vásquez | 1 | 1
15 | (Peru) L Gildemeister | 6 | 6

Second round
1 | (Germany) S Graf | 6 | 6
(Japan) M Kidowaki | 1 | 0
(Japan) K Date | 6 | 0 | 4
(Australia) N Provis | 4 | 6 | 6
(Czechoslovakia) K Habšudová | 7^{12} | 6
(United States) A Smith | 6^{10} | 2
(Australia) E Smylie | 6 | 2 | 9
15 | (Peru) L Gildemeister | 3 | 6 | 7

Third round
1 | (Germany) S Graf | 6 | 6
(Australia) N Provis | 4 | 2
(Czechoslovakia) K Habšudová | 6 | 3 | 8
(Australia) E Smylie | 0 | 6 | 6

Fourth round
1 | (Germany) S Graf | 6 | 6
(Czechoslovakia) K Habšudová | 0 | 1

==== Section 2 ====
First round
10 | (Czechoslovakia) J Novotná | 7^{9} | 6
(Australia) A Minter | 6^{7} | 2
(France) K Quentrec | 7^{8} | 2 | 7
(United States) A Grossman | 6^{6} | 6 | 5
(United States) S Stafford | 6 | 6
(Netherlands) M Bollegraf | 4 | 4
(United States) G Magers | 6 | 6
(Switzerland) E Zardo | 4 | 2
(France) A Dechaume | 6 | 7
(Australia) K Godridge | 3 | 5
(Germany) V Martinek | 6 | 6
(Japan) A Kijimuta | 3 | 1
(Japan) N Miyagi | 7 | 1 | 8
(Mexico) A Gavaldón | 5 | 6 | 6
WC | (Australia) R Stubbs | 2 | 0
8 | (United States) Z Garrison | 6 | 6

Second round
10 | (Czechoslovakia) J Novotná | 6 | 6
(France) K Quentrec | 2 | 2
(United States) S Stafford | 5 | 6 | 6
(United States) G Magers | 7 | 2 | 2
(France) A Dechaume | 6 | 6
(Germany) V Martinek | 2 | 3
(Japan) N Miyagi | 6 | 0 | 2
8 | (United States) Z Garrison | 2 | 6 | 6

Third round
10 | (Czechoslovakia) J Novotná | 6^{2} | 6 | 8
(United States) S Stafford | 7^{7} | 1 | 6
(France) A Dechaume | 2 | 4
8 | (United States) Z Garrison | 6 | 6

Fourth round
10 | (Czechoslovakia) J Novotná | 7^{7} | 6
8 | (United States) Z Garrison | 6^{1} | 4

==== Section 3 ====
First round
4 | (Argentina) G Sabatini | 6 | 6
(United States) L Harvey-Wild | 3 | 1
Q | (Sweden) M Ekstrand | 6 | 7
(Czechoslovakia) J Pospíšilová | 1 | 5
(Czechoslovakia) A Strnadová | 7^{7} | 6
(Belgium) S Wasserman | 6^{2} | 4
(United Kingdom) J Durie | 6 | 3 | 7
WC | (Australia) T Morton | 1 | 6 | 5
(Japan) T Takagi | 6 | 3 | 6
(United States) P Fendick | 2 | 6 | 3
Q | (United States) S Schefflin | 7 | 6
LL | (Netherlands) M Oremans | 5 | 4
(Australia) R McQuillan | 2 | 6 | 6
(Soviet Union) E Brioukhovets | 6 | 4 | 1
(Finland) P Thorén | 3 | 3
12 | (Austria) B Paulus | 6 | 6

Second round
4 | (Argentina) G Sabatini | 6 | 6
Q | (Sweden) M Ekstrand | 1 | 1
(Czechoslovakia) A Strnadová | 6 | 6
(United Kingdom) J Durie | 3 | 2
(Japan) T Takagi | 2 | 4
Q | (United States) S Schefflin | 6 | 6
(Australia) R McQuillan | 6 | 6^{7} | 6
12 | (Austria) B Paulus | 4 | 7^{9} | 4

Third round
4 | (Argentina) G Sabatini | 6 | 6
(Czechoslovakia) A Strnadová | 1 | 1
Q | (United States) S Schefflin | 4 | 0
(Australia) R McQuillan | 6 | 6

Fourth round
4 | (Argentina) G Sabatini | 6 | 6
(Australia) R McQuillan | 3 | 1

==== Section 4 ====
First round
13 | (United States) A Frazier | 6 | 6
WC | (Australia) K McDonald | 3 | 4
(United States) A Leand | 7^{7} | 1 | 8
Q | (Netherlands) I Driehuis | 6^{3} | 6 | 6
(Sweden) C Lindqvist | 7 | 4 | 6
(United States) C Macgregor | 5 | 6 | 3
(United States) C Cunningham | 6 | 6
WC | (Australia) N Pratt | 1 | 1
(United States) L McNeil | 5 | 7^{7} | 6
(United States) K Rinaldi | 7 | 6^{5} | 1
(Soviet Union) L Savchenko-Neiland | 6 | 6
WC | (Australia) D Jones | 2 | 2
(United Kingdom) M Javer | 6 | 6
(United States) A Keller | 2 | 2
(Soviet Union) N Medvedeva | 0 | 2
6 | (Spain) A Sánchez Vicario | 6 | 6

Second round
13 | (United States) A Frazier | 6 | 6
(United States) A Leand | 3 | 0
(Sweden) C Lindqvist | 1 | 0
(United States) C Cunningham | 6 | 6
(United States) L McNeil | 6 | 4 | 6
(Soviet Union) L Savchenko-Neiland | 3 | 6 | 3
(United Kingdom) M Javer | 6 | 4 | 2
6 | (Spain) A Sánchez Vicario | 4 | 6 | 6

Third round
13 | (United States) A Frazier | 3 | 6 | 6
(United States) C Cunningham | 6 | 2 | 2
(United States) L McNeil | 4 | 6 | 0
6 | (Spain) A Sánchez Vicario | 6 | 3 | 6

Fourth round
13 | (United States) A Frazier | 3 | 2
6 | (Spain) A Sánchez Vicario | 6 | 6

==== Section 5 ====
First round
5 | (Bulgaria) K Maleeva | 6 | 6
(Netherlands) B Schultz | 1 | 3
(United States) S Martin | 6 | 6
WC | (Australia) C Barclay | 1 | 1
(Germany) W Probst | 4 | 7^{8} | 6
(United States) A Henricksson | 6 | 6^{6} | 4
(United States) D Faber | 5 | 6 | 6
(United States) E deLone | 7 | 3 | 2
(New Zealand) C Toleafoa | 7 | 6
(Netherlands) S Rottier | 5 | 0
(Bulgaria) M Maleeva | 6 | 5 | 6
(Australia) M Jaggard | 4 | 7 | 4
(United States) T Whitlinger | 6^{3} | 6 | 6
(Italy) R Reggi | 7^{7} | 2 | 2
(United States) G Fernández | 3 | 2
14 | (South Africa) R Fairbank-Nideffer | 6 | 6

Second round
5 | (Bulgaria) K Maleeva | 6 | 6
(United States) S Martin | 2 | 0
(Germany) W Probst | 2 | 0
(United States) D Faber | 6 | 6
(New Zealand) C Toleafoa | 0 | 3
(Bulgaria) M Maleeva | 6 | 6
(United States) T Whitlinger | 4 | 1
14 | (South Africa) R Fairbank-Nideffer | 6 | 6

Third round
5 | (Bulgaria) K Maleeva | 6 | 6
(United States) D Faber | 3 | 2
(Bulgaria) M Maleeva | 6 | 6
14 | (South Africa) R Fairbank-Nideffer | 2 | 3

Fourth round
5 | (Bulgaria) K Maleeva | 6 | 6
(Bulgaria) M Maleeva | 3 | 2

==== Section 6 ====
First round
16 | (Belgium) S Appelmans | 6 | 6
(Argentina) M Paz | 0 | 1
(Argentina) P Tarabini | 6 | 6
(Sweden) M Strandlund | 4 | 0
(France) J Halard | 6 | 6
(Czechoslovakia) D Szabová | 2 | 3
Q | (Netherlands) P Kamstra | 6 | 6
(United States) R White | 4 | 2
(Germany) B Rittner | 4 | 6 | 6
(United Kingdom) S Loosemore | 6 | 3 | 1
(Japan) N Sawamatsu | 6 | 6
(United States) E Burgin | 4 | 3
(Italy) F Romano | 7 | 6
Q | (Germany) M Zivec-Skulj | 5 | 2
(United Kingdom) S Gomer | 1 | 0
3 | (United States) M J Fernández | 6 | 6

Second round
16 | (Belgium) S Appelmans | 7 | 6
(Argentina) P Tarabini | 5 | 1
(France) J Halard | 3 | 4
Q | (Netherlands) P Kamstra | 6 | 6
(Germany) B Rittner | 3 | 3
(Japan) N Sawamatsu | 6 | 6
(Italy) F Romano | 1 | 2
3 | (United States) M J Fernández | 6 | 6

Third round
16 | (Belgium) S Appelmans | 6 | 6
Q | (Netherlands) P Kamstra | 4 | 3
(Japan) N Sawamatsu | 1 | 1
3 | (United States) M J Fernández | 6 | 6

Fourth round
16 | (Belgium) S Appelmans | 3 | 3
3 | (United States) M J Fernández | 6 | 6

==== Section 7 ====
First round
7 | (Switzerland) M Maleeva | 6 | 6
WC | (Australia) J-A Faull | 2 | 0
(Germany) A Huber | 6 | 6
(New Zealand) J Richardson | 4 | 1
(Germany) E Pfaff | 7^{8} | 3 | 6
(Australia) L Field | 6^{6} | 6 | 3
(United States) P Shriver | 6 | 6
(France) N van Lottum | 3 | 1
(Hungary) C Bartos | 6 | 6
(France) N Guerrée | 3 | 2
(United Kingdom) C Wood | 3 | 7^{7} | 6
Q | (United States) S Collins | 6 | 6^{4} | 0
(Germany) C Porwik | 7^{8} | 6
Q | (Germany) M Kochta | 6^{6} | 3
11 | (Soviet Union) N Zvereva | 6 | 6
Q | (United States) G Helgeson | 3 | 4

Second round
7 | (Switzerland) M Maleeva | 4 | 4
(Germany) A Huber | 6 | 6
(Germany) E Pfaff | 3 | 6^{4}
(United States) P Shriver | 6 | 7^{7}
(Hungary) C Bartos | 6 | 3 | 0
(United Kingdom) C Wood | 3 | 6 | 6
(Germany) C Porwik | 6^{9} | 4
11 | (Soviet Union) N Zvereva | 7^{11} | 6

Third round
(Germany) A Huber | 6 | 7
(United States) P Shriver | 3 | 5
(United Kingdom) C Wood | 1 | 3
11 | (Soviet Union) N Zvereva | 6 | 6

Fourth round
(Germany) A Huber | 6 | 6
11 | (Soviet Union) N Zvereva | 3 | 4

==== Section 8 ====
First round
9 | (Czechoslovakia) H Suková | 6 | 6
(New Zealand) B Cordwell | 2 | 1
(Germany) I Cueto | 6 | 2 | 7
(Austria) P Ritter | 4 | 6 | 5
(France) C Tanvier | 6 | 6
(United States) R Baranski | 4 | 1
(Canada) P Hy | 6 | 6
(United States) B Bowes | 4 | 3
(Germany) K Kschwendt | 2 | 6 | 6
(Czechoslovakia) P Langrová | 6 | 3 | 2
(Czechoslovakia) R Rajchrtová | 4 | 7 | 8
WC | (Australia) L Stacey | 6 | 5 | 6
(Italy) C Caverzasio | 6 | 3 | 6
(Germany) S Meier | 3 | 6 | 3
(Germany) S Hack | 0 | 0
2 | (Socialist Federal Republic of Yugoslavia) M Seles | 6 | 6

Second round
9 | (Czechoslovakia) H Suková | 6 | 7
(Germany) I Cueto | 2 | 5
(France) C Tanvier | 6^{7} | 7 | 6
(Canada) P Hy | 7^{9} | 5 | 1
(Germany) K Kschwendt | 6 | 6
(Czechoslovakia) R Rajchrtová | 1 | 1
(Italy) C Caverzasio | 1 | 0
2 | (Socialist Federal Republic of Yugoslavia) M Seles | 6 | 6

Third round
9 | (Czechoslovakia) H Suková | 6 | 1 | 4
(France) C Tanvier | 4 | 6 | 6
(Germany) K Kschwendt | 3 | 1
2 | (Socialist Federal Republic of Yugoslavia) M Seles | 6 | 6

Fourth round
(France) C Tanvier | 2 | 1
2 | (Socialist Federal Republic of Yugoslavia) M Seles | 6 | 6

| Preceded by 1990 US Open – Women's singles | Grand Slam women's singles | Succeeded by 1991 French Open – Women's singles |
