= 1991 Australian Open – Men's singles =

Men's singles
- 1991 Australian Open

Final
- Champion: (Germany) Boris Becker
- Runner-up: (Czechoslovakia) Ivan Lendl
- Score: 1–6, 6–4, 6–4, 6–4

Details
- Draw: 128
- Seeds: 16

Events
Singles	men	women		boys	girls
Doubles	men	women	mixed	boys	girls
WC Singles	men	women	quad
WC Doubles	men	women	quad
Legends	men	women	mixed
- Australian Open

Boris Becker defeated two-time defending champion Ivan Lendl in the final, 1–6, 6–4, 6–4, 6–4 to win the men's singles tennis title at the 1991 Australian Open. It was his first Australian Open title and fifth major singles title overall.

== Seeds ==
1. (Sweden) Stefan Edberg (semifinals)
2. (Germany) Boris Becker (champion)
3. (Czechoslovakia) Ivan Lendl (final)
4. (United States) Pete Sampras (withdrew because of shin splints)
5. (Socialist Federal Republic of Yugoslavia) Goran Ivanišević (third round)
6. (Spain) Emilio Sánchez (first round)
7. (United States) Brad Gilbert (third round)
8. (Sweden) Jonas Svensson (third round)

9. (Soviet Union) Andrei Chesnokov (first round)
10. (France) Guy Forget (quarterfinals)
11. (Switzerland) Jakob Hlasek (first round)
12. (United States) Jay Berger (third round)
13. (United States) Aaron Krickstein (fourth round)
14. (Soviet Union) Andrei Cherkasov (second round)
15. (Switzerland) Marc Rosset (first round)
16. (United States) Jim Courier (fourth round)

Click on the seed number of a player to go to their draw section.^{[a]}

== Draw ==
Key

- Q = Qualifier
- WC = Wild card
- LL = Lucky loser
- Alt = Alternate
- ITF = ITF entry
- PR = Protected ranking
- SR = Special ranking
- SE = Special exempt
- JE = Junior exempt
- JR = Junior Accelerator Programme entrant
- CO = College Accelerator Programme entrant
- NG = Next Gen Accelerator Program entrant
- w/o = Walkover
- r = Retired
- d = Defaulted

=== Finals ===
Quarterfinals
1	(Sweden) Stefan Edberg	6	6	6
(Peru) Jaime Yzaga	2	3	2
3	(Czechoslovakia) Ivan Lendl	6	7^{7}	7^{7}
(Socialist Federal Republic of Yugoslavia) Goran Prpić	0	6^{1}	6^{2}
(United States) Patrick McEnroe	7^{7}	6	4	4	6
(Italy) Cristiano Caratti	6^{2}	3	6	6	2
10	(France) Guy Forget	2	6^{2}	3
2	(Germany) Boris Becker	6	7^{7}	6

Semifinals
1	(Sweden) Stefan Edberg	4	7	6	6^{3}	4
3	(Czechoslovakia) Ivan Lendl	6	5	3	7^{7}	6
(United States) Patrick McEnroe	7^{7}	4	1	4
2	(Germany) Boris Becker	6^{2}	6	6	6

Final
3	(Czechoslovakia) Ivan Lendl	6	4	4	4
2	(Germany) Boris Becker	1	6	6	6

=== Top half ===
==== Section 1 ====
First round
1	(Sweden) S Edberg	6	7^{8}	6
Q	(Soviet Union) D Poliakov	1	6^{6}	2
(United States) B Pearce	7^{7}	1	7^{8}	3	6
(Belgium) E Masso	6^{4}	6	6^{6}	6	8
(Czechoslovakia) K Nováček	2	4	1
(Australia) P Cash	6	6	6
(South Africa) C van Rensburg	6	6	7
(Australia) M Kratzmann	3	1	5
(Portugal) N Marques	4	6	1	6	6
(Portugal) J Cunha e Silva	6	4	6	3	4
Q	(Australia) J Arbanas	3	3	5
(Brazil) J Oncins	6	6	7
LL	(Uruguay) D Pérez	5	2	3
(Israel) G Bloom	7	6	6
(Sweden) J Gunnarsson	3	4	2
16	(United States) J Courier	6	6	6

Second round
1	(Sweden) S Edberg	6	6	6
(Belgium) E Masso	1	2	3
(Australia) P Cash	7^{8}	6	6
(South Africa) C van Rensburg	6^{6}	4	4
(Portugal) N Marques	3	0	2
(Brazil) J Oncins	6	6	6
(Israel) G Bloom	2	3	2
16	(United States) J Courier	6	6	6

Third round
1	(Sweden) S Edberg	7^{8}	7	6
(Australia) P Cash	6^{6}	5	2
(Brazil) J Oncins	3	1	1
16	(United States) J Courier	6	6	6

Fourth round
1	(Sweden) S Edberg	4	6	6	5	6
16	(United States) J Courier	6	0	4	7	2

==== Section 2 ====
First round
9	(Soviet Union) A Chesnokov	0	3	6	6	4
(United States) J Arias	6	6	4	2	6
Q	(Belgium) B Wuyts	5	5	6	7^{7}	9
(Sweden) L Jönsson	7	7	4	6^{3}	7
(Peru) J Yzaga	6	6	6
Q	(Czechoslovakia) D Vacek	4	4	2
LL	(Netherlands) M Schapers	6	6	2	6
(Germany) M Sinner	3	2	6	2
Q	(Germany) C Saceanu	2	6	6	3	7
(United States) J Tarango	6	3	2	6	5
(Sweden) M Wilander	7^{7}	6	6
WC	(Australia) H Denman	6^{5}	3	4
WC	(Australia) P Doohan	4	6^{5}	5
(Australia) R Fromberg	6	7^{7}	7
(United States) D Wheaton	4	6	3	6^{5}
7	(United States) B Gilbert	6	4	6	7^{7}

Second round
(United States) J Arias	6	6	6
Q	(Belgium) B Wuyts	3	1	2
(Peru) J Yzaga	7^{7}	6	6
LL	(Netherlands) M Schapers	6^{2}	4	2
Q	(Germany) C Saceanu	6	4	6	6	4
(Sweden) M Wilander	7	6	3	4	6
(Australia) R Fromberg	6	4	4	6	0
7	(United States) B Gilbert	4	6	6	4	6

Third round
(United States) J Arias	6	6^{6}	1	3
(Peru) J Yzaga	3	7^{8}	6	6
(Sweden) M Wilander	7^{8}	6	6
7	(United States) B Gilbert	6^{6}	1	4

Fourth round
(Peru) J Yzaga	7	2	6	3	6
(Sweden) M Wilander	5	6	1	6	1

==== Section 3 ====
First round
3	(Czechoslovakia) I Lendl	6	6	6
(France) T Benhabiles	1	1	3
(United States) S Davis	3	6	6	6
(Austria) A Antonitsch	6	2	4	3
WC	(Australia) J Morgan	1	0	3
(Sweden) M Gustafsson	6	6	6
WC	(Australia) S Stolle	1	2	2
(Australia) W Masur	6	6	6
(Germany) P Kühnen	7	6	7^{7}
(France) G Raoux	5	4	6^{4}
Q	(Argentina) J Frana	5	6	3	3
Q	(Czechoslovakia) S Doseděl	7	2	6	6
(Canada) A Sznajder	0	3	3
(Israel) A Mansdorf	6	6	6
(Australia) S Youl	4	4	4
13	(United States) A Krickstein	6	6	6

Second round
3	(Czechoslovakia) I Lendl	7^{7}	6	6
(United States) S Davis	6^{3}	3	2
(Sweden) M Gustafsson	7	3	7^{7}	6
(Australia) W Masur	5	6	6^{4}	0
(Germany) P Kühnen	6	6	6
Q	(Czechoslovakia) S Doseděl	2	4	4
(Israel) A Mansdorf	5	6	6^{4}	2
13	(United States) A Krickstein	7	3	7^{7}	6

Third round
3	(Czechoslovakia) I Lendl	4	6	6	6
(Sweden) M Gustafsson	6	2	3	2
(Germany) P Kühnen	4	4	1
13	(United States) A Krickstein	6	6	6

Fourth round
3	(Czechoslovakia) I Lendl	6	6	6
13	(United States) A Krickstein	2	2	1

==== Section 4 ====
First round
11	(Switzerland) J Hlasek	6	4	5	4
(Australia) J Stoltenberg	0	6	7	6
(Netherlands) M Koevermans	6	6	3	2	6
(United States) D Pate	4	2	6	6	0
Q	(Netherlands) J Siemerink	6	6	6
(Spain) JF Altur	3	3	3
(Germany) C-U Steeb	6	6	6
(Italy) C Pistolesi	2	2	3
(Socialist Federal Republic of Yugoslavia) G Prpić	6	6	3	6
(United States) J Pugh	3	2	6	2
(Brazil) L Mattar	6	7	6^{3}	6
(Sweden) N Kulti	4	5	7^{7}	3
(India) R Krishnan	7^{8}
(Germany) E Jelen	6^{6}	r
(Spain) S Bruguera	4	6	1	4
5	(Socialist Federal Republic of Yugoslavia) G Ivanišević	6	0	6	6

Second round
(Australia) J Stoltenberg	3	3	3
(Netherlands) M Koevermans	6	6	6
Q	(Netherlands) J Siemerink	6	5	4	6	6
(Germany) C-U Steeb	2	7	6	4	2
(Socialist Federal Republic of Yugoslavia) G Prpić	6	6	6
(Brazil) L Mattar	3	1	1
(India) R Krishnan	4	6	6	1	2
5	(Socialist Federal Republic of Yugoslavia) G Ivanišević	6	3	4	6	6

Third round
(Netherlands) M Koevermans	6	2	4	6	1
Q	(Netherlands) J Siemerink	4	6	6	3	6
(Socialist Federal Republic of Yugoslavia) G Prpić	6	6	6
5	(Socialist Federal Republic of Yugoslavia) G Ivanišević	3	4	3

Fourth round
Q	(Netherlands) J Siemerink	6^{3}	7^{7}	0	6^{7}
(Socialist Federal Republic of Yugoslavia) G Prpić	7^{7}	6^{3}	6	7^{9}

=== Bottom half ===
==== Section 5 ====
First round
6	(Spain) E Sánchez	6	5	6^{5}	2
(Australia) M Woodforde	0	7	7^{7}	6
(Italy) P Canè	6^{3}	6	3	4
(United States) B Shelton	7^{7}	4	6	6
(South Africa) G Muller	4	3	1
(Sweden) A Järryd	6	6	6
(Sweden) N Kroon	1	4	2
(Canada) G Connell	6	6	6
(United States) P McEnroe	4	4	6	6	6
(Sweden) T Högstedt	6	6	3	1	3
WC	(Australia) J Anderson	6	6	6
(Finland) A Rahunen	2	4	3
Q	(United States) K Jones	0	0	0
(United States) T Witsken	6	6	6
(Sweden) M Larsson	3	4	0
12	(United States) J Berger	6	6	6

Second round
(Australia) M Woodforde	7^{7}	6	6
(United States) B Shelton	6^{3}	3	3
(Sweden) A Järryd	1	5	2
(Canada) G Connell	6	7	6
(United States) P McEnroe	6	6	5	6
WC	(Australia) J Anderson	3	3	7	1
(United States) T Witsken	1	3	0
12	(United States) J Berger	6	6	6

Third round
(Australia) M Woodforde	6	3	7	6
(Canada) G Connell	4	6	5	3
(United States) P McEnroe	6	7	7
12	(United States) J Berger	1	5	5

Fourth round
(Australia) M Woodforde	2	4	1
(United States) P McEnroe	6	6	6

==== Section 6 ====
First round
14	(Soviet Union) A Cherkasov	3	6	6	4	10
(United States) D Rostagno	6	4	1	6	8
(Australia) D Cahill	6	6	6
Q	(United States) J Canter	1	4	3
(Soviet Union) A Volkov	1	6	6	4	5
(Czechoslovakia) P Korda	6	1	1	6	7
(Netherlands) R Krajicek	2	6	6	6
(France) F Santoro	6	1	2	3
(Italy) C Caratti	6	3	6	6
WC	(Australia) B Dyke	2	6	4	3
(Sweden) D Engel	6	2	6	6
(New Zealand) K Evernden	3	6	1	0
(Germany) U Riglewski	3	3	6	7^{9}	2
LL	(United States) G Layendecker	6	6	4	6^{7}	6
(Sweden) P Lundgren	7^{7}	3	7^{7}	6
Q	(Mexico) L Lavalle	6^{3}	6	6^{2}	1

Second round
14	(Soviet Union) A Cherkasov	6	6	3	5	5
(Australia) D Cahill	4	2	6	7	7
(Czechoslovakia) P Korda	6	6^{3}	3	4
(Netherlands) R Krajicek	4	7^{7}	6	6
(Italy) C Caratti	3	6	6	6
(Sweden) D Engel	6	2	3	4
LL	(United States) G Layendecker	3	1	7	6	6
(Sweden) P Lundgren	6	6	5	3	4

Third round
(Australia) D Cahill	7^{7}	3	3	6^{4}
(Netherlands) R Krajicek	6^{5}	6	6	7^{7}
(Italy) C Caratti	6	6	5	4	7
LL	(United States) G Layendecker	4	4	7	6	5

Fourth round
(Netherlands) R Krajicek	3	4	7^{7}	6	4
(Italy) C Caratti	6	6	6^{4}	3	6

==== Section 7 ====
First round
8	(Sweden) J Svensson	6	6	6
(France) T Champion	3	4	1
Q	(United Kingdom) A Castle	7^{9}	2	1	2
(Spain) F Clavet	6^{7}	6	6	6
Q	(South Africa) M Kaplan	6	3	3	1
(Australia) T Woodbridge	1	6	6	6
(France) C Pioline	4	2	6	6^{4}
(Sweden) C Bergström	6	6	1	7^{7}
(Mexico) L Herrera	3	1	6	7^{7}	4
(Argentina) M Jaite	6	6	3	6^{4}	6
(Germany) M Stich	4	5	7^{7}	6	6
(United States) M Washington	6	7	6^{5}	1	4
WC	(Australia) J Fitzgerald	4	4	4
(Germany) A Mronz	6	6	6
(Austria) H Skoff	6^{5}	2	4
10	(France) G Forget	7^{7}	6	6

Second round
8	(Sweden) J Svensson	6	7	3	6
(Spain) F Clavet	2	5	6	1
(Australia) T Woodbridge	6	0	6	7^{7}
(Sweden) C Bergström	1	6	2	6^{4}
(Argentina) M Jaite	3	6^{4}	6^{2}
(Germany) M Stich	6	7^{7}	7^{7}
(Germany) A Mronz	7^{7}	4	4	2
10	(France) G Forget	6^{4}	6	6	6

Third round
8	(Sweden) J Svensson	5	2	1
(Australia) T Woodbridge	7	6	6
(Germany) M Stich	6^{5}	6^{6}	6	3
10	(France) G Forget	7^{7}	7^{8}	4	6

Fourth round
(Australia) T Woodbridge	4	6	3	4
10	(France) G Forget	6	3	6	6

==== Section 8 ====
First round
15	(Switzerland) M Rosset	6	6	6^{4}	3	7
Q	(Sweden) L-A Wahlgren	4	2	7^{7}	6	9
(Spain) F Luna	1	3	2
Q	(South Africa) W Ferreira	6	6	6
(United States) R Weiss	6	2	3	5
(Netherlands) J Eltingh	3	6	6	7
(France) J-P Fleurian	6	6	6
(Italy) R Furlan	1	0	0
(Italy) O Camporese	3	6	7^{7}	6
Q	(Germany) M Zoecke	6	2	6^{5}	4
(Netherlands) P Haarhuis	2	6	6	7^{7}
(Spain) J Sánchez	6	1	2	6^{3}
(Czechoslovakia) M Vajda	2	6	7	6
(United States) B Garrow	6	4	5	3
(United Kingdom) J Bates	4	2	3
2	(Germany) B Becker	6	6	6

Second round
Q	(Sweden) L-A Wahlgren	2	4	6^{8}
Q	(South Africa) W Ferreira	6	6	7^{10}
(Netherlands) J Eltingh	6	3	7^{7}	3	6
(France) J-P Fleurian	1	6	6^{4}	6	1
(Italy) O Camporese	7	7	3	6
(Netherlands) P Haarhuis	5	5	6	3
(Czechoslovakia) M Vajda	4	1	3
2	(Germany) B Becker	6	6	6

Third round
Q	(South Africa) W Ferreira	6	6	6
(Netherlands) J Eltingh	2	4	2
(Italy) O Camporese	6^{4}	6^{5}	6	6	12
2	(Germany) B Becker	7^{7}	7^{7}	0	4	14

Fourth round
Q	(South Africa) W Ferreira	4	6^{5}	4
2	(Germany) B Becker	6	7^{7}	6

== Notes ==
a. Andre Agassi (No. 4), Andrés Gómez (No. 6), Thomas Muster (No. 7), John McEnroe (No. 13), Guillermo Pérez Roldán (No. 14), Michael Chang (No. 15) and Juan Aguilera (No. 19) all withdrew from the tournament prior to the seedings.

Preceded by 1990 US Open	Grand Slam men's singles	Succeeded by 1991 French Open
