= 1991 Australian Open =

- Date: 14–27 January 1991
- Edition: 79th
- Category: Grand Slam (ITF)
- Surface: Hardcourt (Rebound Ace)
- Location: Melbourne, Australia
- Venue: National Tennis Centre at Flinders Park

Champions

Men's singles
- (Germany) Boris Becker

Women's singles
- (Socialist Federal Republic of Yugoslavia) Monica Seles

Men's doubles
- (United States) Scott Davis / (United States) David Pate

Women's doubles
- (United States) Patty Fendick / (United States) Mary Joe Fernández

Mixed doubles
- (United Kingdom) Jo Durie / (United Kingdom) Jeremy Bates

Boys' singles
- (Sweden) Thomas Enqvist

Girls' singles
- (Australia) Nicole Pratt

Boys' doubles
- (Australia) Grant Doyle / (Australia) Joshua Eagle

Girls' doubles
- (Czechoslovakia) Karina Habšudová / (Germany) Barbara Rittner
- Australian Open

The 1991 Australian Open was a tennis tournament played on outdoor hard courts at Flinders Park in Melbourne in Victoria in Australia. It was the 79th edition of the Australian Open and was held from 14 through 27 January 1991.

== Seniors ==
=== Men's singles ===
(Germany) Boris Becker defeated (Czechoslovakia) Ivan Lendl 1–6, 6–4, 6–4, 6–4

- It was Becker's 5th career Grand Slam title and his 1st Australian Open title. He became the first male German player to win an Australian Open singles title.

=== Women's singles ===
(Socialist Federal Republic of Yugoslavia) Monica Seles defeated (Czechoslovakia) Jana Novotná 5–7, 6–3, 6–1

- It was Seles's 2nd career Grand Slam title and her 1st Australian Open title. She became the only Yugoslav player – male or female – to win a Grand Slam singles title.

=== Men's doubles ===
(United States) Scott Davis / (United States) David Pate defeated (United States) Patrick McEnroe / (United States) David Wheaton 6–7^{(4–7)}, 7–6^{(10–8)}, 6–3, 7–5

- It was Davis' only career Grand Slam title. It was Pate's only career Grand Slam title.

=== Women's doubles ===
(United States) Patty Fendick / (United States) Mary Joe Fernández defeated (United States) Gigi Fernández / (Czechoslovakia) Jana Novotná 7–6^{(7–4)}, 6–1

- It was Fendick's only career Grand Slam title. It was Fernandez's 1st career Grand Slam title and her only Australian Open title.

=== Mixed doubles ===
(United Kingdom) Jo Durie / (United Kingdom) Jeremy Bates defeated (United States) Robin White / (United States) Scott Davis 2–6, 6–4, 6–4

- It was Durie's 2nd and last career Grand Slam title and her only Australian Open title. It was Bates' 2nd and last career Grand Slam title and his only Australian Open title.

== Juniors ==
=== Boys' singles ===
(Sweden) Thomas Enqvist defeated (Australia) Stephen Gleeson 7–6, 6–7, 6–1

=== Girls' singles ===
(Australia) Nicole Pratt defeated (Australia) Kristin Godridge 6–4, 6–3

=== Boys' doubles ===
(Australia) Grant Doyle / (Australia) Joshua Eagle defeated (Australia) Jamie Holmes / (Australia) Paul Kilderry 7–6, 6–4

=== Girls' doubles ===
(Czechoslovakia) Karina Habšudová / (Germany) Barbara Rittner defeated (Australia) Joanne Limmer / (Australia) Angie Woolcock 6–2, 6–0

Preceded by 1990 US Open	Grand Slams	Succeeded by 1991 French Open
