= 1998 Grand Prix de Tennis de Toulouse – Doubles =

Doubles
- 1998 Grand Prix de Tennis de Toulouse

Final
- Champions: (France) Olivier Delaître (France) Fabrice Santoro
- Runners-up: (Netherlands) Paul Haarhuis (Netherlands) Jan Siemerink
- Score: 6–2, 6–4

Details
- Draw: 16 (3WC/1Q)
- Seeds: 4

Events
Singles	Doubles
← 1997 ·	Grand Prix de Tennis de Toulouse	· 1999 →

The 1998 Grand Prix de Tennis de Toulouse was a men's tennis tournament played on Indoor Hard in Toulouse, France that was part of the International Series of the 1998 ATP Tour. It was the seventeenth edition of the tournament and was held from 28 September – 4 October.

== Seeds ==
Champion seeds are indicated in bold text while text in italics indicates the round in which those seeds were eliminated.

1. (France) **Olivier Delaître** / (France) **Fabrice Santoro (champions)**
2. (Australia) Andrew Kratzmann / (Mexico) David Roditi (quarterfinals)
3. (Netherlands) Paul Haarhuis / (Netherlands) Jan Siemerink (final)
4. (United States) Jeff Tarango / (Czech Republic) Daniel Vacek (semifinals)

== Draw ==
=== Key ===
- Q = Qualifier
- WC = Wild card
- LL = Lucky loser
- Alt = Alternate
- SE = Special exempt
- PR = Protected ranking
- ITF = ITF entry
- JE = Junior exempt
- w/o = Walkover
- r = Retired
- d = Defaulted
- SR = Special ranking

=== Finals ===
First round
1	(France) **O Delaître** **(France) F Santoro**	**7**	**6**
(Hungary) G Köves (Switzerland) M Rosset	5	4
(South Africa) **D Adams** **(Belarus) M Mirnyi**	**7**	**6**
(United States) K Kinnear (North Macedonia) A Kitinov	5	3
4	(United States) **J Tarango** **(Czech Republic) D Vacek**	1	**6**	**7**
(New Zealand) J Greenhalgh (Socialist Federal Republic of Yugoslavia) N Zimonjić	**6**	3	6
(Sweden) **N Kulti** **(Sweden) P Nyborg**	3	**6**	**6**
Q	(France) L Barthez (France) G Marx	**6**	1	2
WC	(France) **A Clément** **(France) J Golmard**	**6**	**6**
(South Africa) C Haggard (Netherlands) M Oosting	4	2
3	(Netherlands) **P Haarhuis** **(Netherlands) J Siemerink**	**7**	**6**
WC	(Germany) N Kiefer (Germany) A Rădulescu	6	1
(Netherlands) **S Groen** **(Czech Republic) P Vízner**	0
WC	(France) S Grosjean (France) G Raoux	1	R
2	(Australia) **A Kratzmann** **(Mexico) D Roditi**	**6**	3	**6**
(United States) E Taino (South Africa) B Talbot	4	**6**	3

Quarterfinals
1	(France) **O Delaître** **(France) F Santoro**	**7**	5	**6**
(South Africa) D Adams (Belarus) M Mirnyi	6	**7**	3
4	(United States) **J Tarango** **(Czech Republic) D Vacek**	4	**7**	**7**
(Sweden) N Kulti (Sweden) P Nyborg	**6**	6	6
WC	(France) A Clément (France) J Golmard	**6**	1	5
3	(Netherlands) **P Haarhuis** **(Netherlands) J Siemerink**	4	**6**	**7**
(Netherlands) **S Groen** **(Czech Republic) P Vízner**	**6**	4	**6**
2	(Australia) A Kratzmann (Mexico) D Roditi	3	**6**	4

Semifinals
1	(France) **O Delaître** **(France) F Santoro**	**7**	**6**
4	(United States) J Tarango (Czech Republic) D Vacek	6	3
3	(Netherlands) **P Haarhuis** **(Netherlands) J Siemerink**	**7**	**6**
(Netherlands) S Groen (Czech Republic) P Vízner	5	3

Final
1	(France) **O Delaître** **(France) F Santoro**	**6**	**6**
3	(Netherlands) P Haarhuis (Netherlands) J Siemerink	2	4

== Qualifying ==
=== Qualifying seeds ===
1. (France) Jérôme Hanquez / (France) Régis Lavergne (qualifying competition)
2. (Argentina) Guillermo Cañas / (Armenia) Sargis Sargsian (first round)

=== Qualifiers ===
1. **(France) Lionel Barthez / (France) Guillaume Marx**

=== Qualifying draw ===
First round
1	**(France) Jérôme Hanquez** **(France) Régis Lavergne**	3	**6**	**6**
(Argentina) José María Arnedo (Argentina) Marcello Wowk	**6**	2	3
WC	**(France) Lionel Barthez** **(France) Guillaume Marx**	**7**	**6**
2	(Argentina) Guillermo Cañas (Armenia) Sargis Sargsian	5	4

Qualifying competition
1	(France) Jérôme Hanquez (France) Régis Lavergne	3	1
WC	**(France) Lionel Barthez** **(France) Guillaume Marx**	**6**	**6**
