= 1999 Adidas Open de Toulouse – Singles =

Singles
- 1999 Adidas Open de Toulouse

Final
- Champion: (France) Nicolas Escudé
- Runner-up: (Czech Republic) Daniel Vacek
- Score: 7–5, 6–1

Details
- Draw: 32
- Seeds: 8

Events
Singles	Doubles
← 1998 ·	Grand Prix de Tennis de Toulouse	· 2000 →

The 1999 Adidas Open de Toulouse was a men's tennis tournament played on Indoor Hard in Toulouse, France that was part of the World Series of the 1999 ATP Tour. It was the eighteenth edition of the tournament and was held from 27 September until 3 October 1999.

== Seeds ==
Champion seeds are indicated in bold text while text in italics indicates the round in which those seeds were eliminated.

1. (United Kingdom) Tim Henman (second round)
2. (France) Cédric Pioline (first round)
3. (Sweden) Thomas Johansson (semifinals)
4. (France) Sébastien Grosjean (first round)
5. (Switzerland) Marc Rosset (semifinals)
6. (Russia) Marat Safin (first round)
7. (France) Fabrice Santoro (quarterfinals)
8. (France) Arnaud Clément (first round)

== Draw ==
=== Key ===
- Q = Qualifier
- WC = Wild card
- LL = Lucky loser
- Alt = Alternate
- SE = Special exempt
- PR = Protected ranking
- ITF = ITF entry
- JE = Junior exempt
- w/o = Walkover
- r = Retired
- d = Defaulted
- SR = Special ranking

=== Finals ===
Semifinals
**(France) Nicolas Escudé**	**7**	**6**
5	(Switzerland) Marc Rosset	6	4
3	(Sweden) Thomas Johansson	1	**7**	2
**(Czech Republic) Daniel Vacek**	**6**	5	**6**

Final
**(France) Nicolas Escudé**	**7**	**6**
(Czech Republic) Daniel Vacek	5	1

=== Top half ===
First round
1	**(United Kingdom) T Henman**	**6**	**6**
(France) T Guardiola	1	2
**(France) N Escudé**	**7**	**7**
(France) S Huet	6	'6
**(Switzerland) R Federer**	**7**	**6**
(Germany) R Schüttler	6	1
7	**(France) F Santoro**	4	**7**	**6**
(Netherlands) J van Lottum	**6**	5	0
**(Sweden) M Gustafsson**	6	**6**	**6**
4	(France) S Grosjean	**7**	4	3
**(Zimbabwe) B Black**	**6**	3	**6**
(United States) C Woodruff	4	**6**	1
**(Italy) G Pozzi**	**6**	**6**
(France) G Raoux	4	0
5	**(Switzerland) M Rosset**	**6**	5	**7**
(Croatia) G Ivanišević	4	**7**	6

Second round
1	(United Kingdom) T Henman	4	2
**(France) N Escudé**	**6**	**6**
(Switzerland) R Federer	3	6
7	**(France) F Santoro**	**6**	**7**
**(Sweden) M Gustafsson**	**6**	**6**
(Zimbabwe) B Black	4	2
(Italy) G Pozzi	2	**7**	3
5	**(Switzerland) M Rosset**	**6**	6	**6**

Quarterfinals
**(France) N Escudé**	4	**7**	**6**
7	(France) F Santoro	**6**	5	2
(Sweden) M Gustafsson	3	**6**	3
5	**(Switzerland) M Rosset**	**6**	3	**6**

Semifinals
**(France) N Escudé**	**7**	**6**
5	(Switzerland) M Rosset	6	4

=== Bottom half ===
First round
**(France) A Dupuis**	**6**	6	**6**
6	(Russia) M Safin	4	**7**	4
**(Paraguay) R Delgado**	**7**	**6**
(Argentina) M Rodriguez	6	4
**(Czech Republic) P Luxa**	**6**	**6**
(Croatia) I Ljubičić	2	4
3	**(Sweden) T Johansson**	**7**	**6**
(Netherlands) J Siemerink	6	1
**(Czech Republic) D Vacek**	**7**	**6**
8	(France) A Clément	6	3
**(France) R Gilbert**	**6**	**6**
(Haiti) R Agénor	1	1
**(United States) J Tarango**	**6**	**6**
(Germany) H Dreekmann	2	3
**(Australia) R Fromberg**	**7**	2	**6**
2	(France) C Pioline	6	**6**	4

Second round
**(France) A Dupuis**	**6**	**6**
(Paraguay) R Delgado	4	4
(Czech Republic) P Luxa	2	4
3	**(Sweden) T Johansson**	**6**	**6**
**(Czech Republic) D Vacek**	**6**	**6**
(France) R Gilbert	3	2
**(United States) J Tarango**	**6**	6	**6**
(Australia) R Fromberg	4	**7**	4

Quarterfinals
(France) A Dupuis	**7**	3	4
3	**(Sweden) T Johansson**	6	**6**	**6**
**(Czech Republic) D Vacek**	**6**	**6**
(United States) J Tarango	4	1

Semifinals
3	(Sweden) T Johansson	1	**7**	2
**(Czech Republic) D Vacek**	**6**	5	**6**
