= 1995 Grand Prix de Tennis de Toulouse – Doubles =

Doubles
- 1995 Grand Prix de Tennis de Toulouse

Final
- Champions: (Sweden) Jonas Björkman (South Africa) John-Laffnie de Jager
- Runners-up: (United States) Dave Randall (United States) Greg Van Emburgh
- Score: 7–6, 7–6

Details
- Draw: 16
- Seeds: 4

Events
Singles	Doubles
← 1994 ·	Grand Prix de Tennis de Toulouse	· 1996 →

The 1995 Grand Prix de Tennis de Toulouse was a men's tennis tournament played on Indoor Hard in Toulouse, France that was part of the World Series of the 1995 ATP Tour. It was the fourteenth edition of the tournament and was held from 2 October until 8 October 1995.

== Seeds ==
Champion seeds are indicated in bold text while text in italics indicates the round in which those seeds were eliminated.

1. (Czech Republic) Cyril Suk / (Czech Republic) Daniel Vacek (first round)
2. (United States) Jared Palmer / (United States) Richey Reneberg (first round)
3. (United States) Rick Leach / (United States) Scott Melville (first round)
4. (Sweden) **Jonas Björkman** / (South Africa) **John-Laffnie de Jager (champions)**

== Draw ==
=== Key ===
- Q = Qualifier
- WC = Wild card
- LL = Lucky loser
- Alt = Alternate
- SE = Special exempt
- PR = Protected ranking
- ITF = ITF entry
- JE = Junior exempt
- w/o = Walkover
- r = Retired
- d = Defaulted
- SR = Special ranking

=== Finals ===
First round
(Argentina) **J Frana** **(Germany) M Sinner**	**6**	3	**6**
1	(Czech Republic) C Suk (Czech Republic) D Vacek	3	**6**	2
(United Kingdom) **N Broad** **(South Africa) G Muller**	**7**	**6**
(France) L Barthez (France) F Santoro	6	4
4	(Sweden) **J Björkman** **(South Africa) J-L de Jager**	3	**6**	**6**
(South Africa) E Ferreira (Netherlands) J Siemerink	**6**	4	1
(South Africa) **L Bale** **(South Africa) M Barnard**	1	**6**	**6**
(Australia) J Ireland (Netherlands) S Noteboom	**6**	3	2
(France) **G Forget** **(France) C Pioline**	4	**6**	**6**
(Czech Republic) V Flégl (Germany) D Prinosil	**6**	3	2
(France) **R Gilbert** **(France) G Raoux**	**7**	**6**
3	(United States) R Leach (United States) S Melville	6	2
(France) **A Boetsch** **(Switzerland) M Rosset**	**6**	**7**
(Zimbabwe) W Black (South Africa) C Haggard	4	6
(United States) **D Randall** **(United States) G Van Emburgh**	**6**	**6**
2	(United States) J Palmer (United States) R Reneberg	3	4

Quarterfinals
(Argentina) **J Frana** **(Germany) M Sinner**	3	**6**	**7**
(United Kingdom) N Broad (South Africa) G Muller	**6**	3	5
4	(Sweden) **J Björkman** **(South Africa) J-L de Jager**	**6**	**6**
(South Africa) L Bale (South Africa) M Barnard	4	4
(France) G Forget (France) C Pioline	3	4
(France) **R Gilbert** **(France) G Raoux**	**6**	**6**
(France) A Boetsch (Switzerland) M Rosset
(United States) **D Randall** **(United States) G Van Emburgh**	w/o

Semifinals
(Argentina) J Frana (Germany) M Sinner	3	1
4	(Sweden) **J Björkman** **(South Africa) J-L de Jager**	**6**	**6**
(France) R Gilbert (France) G Raoux	**6**	6	4
(United States) **D Randall** **(United States) G Van Emburgh**	3	**7**	**6**

Final
4	(Sweden) **J Björkman** **(South Africa) J-L de Jager**	**7**	**7**
(United States) D Randall (United States) G Van Emburgh	6	6
