= 1999 Adidas Open de Toulouse – Doubles =

Doubles
- 1999 Adidas Open de Toulouse

Final
- Champions: (France) Olivier Delaître (United States) Jeff Tarango
- Runners-up: (South Africa) David Adams (South Africa) John-Laffnie de Jager
- Score: 3–6, 7–6, 6–4

Events
Singles	Doubles
← 1998 ·	Grand Prix de Tennis de Toulouse	· 2000 →

The 1999 Adidas Open de Toulouse was a men's tennis tournament played on Indoor Hard in Toulouse, France that was part of the World Series of the 1999 ATP Tour. It was the eighteenth edition of the tournament and was held from 27 September until 3 October 1999.

== Seeds ==
Champion seeds are indicated in bold text while text in italics indicates the round in which those seeds were eliminated.

1. (France) **Olivier Delaître** / (United States) **Jeff Tarango (champions)**
2. (South Africa) Ellis Ferreira / (United States) Rick Leach (semifinals)
3. (South Africa) David Adams / (South Africa) John-Laffnie de Jager (final)
4. (United States) Donald Johnson / (Czech Republic) Cyril Suk (semifinals)

== Draw ==
=== Key ===
- Q = Qualifier
- WC = Wild card
- LL = Lucky loser
- Alt = Alternate
- SE = Special exempt
- PR = Protected ranking
- ITF = ITF entry
- JE = Junior exempt
- w/o = Walkover
- r = Retired
- d = Defaulted
- SR = Special ranking

=== Finals ===
First round
1	(France) **O Delaître** **(United States) J Tarango**	6	**6**	**7**
(France) A Clément (France) S Grosjean	**7**	0	6
(Switzerland) **G Bastl** **(Czech Republic) P Luxa**	**6**	**6**
(Portugal) N Marques (Belgium) T Vanhoudt	4	4
4	(United States) **D Johnson** **(Czech Republic) C Suk**	**6**	**6**
(France) R Gilbert (France) S Huet	3	2
(France) **N Escudé** **(France) J Hanquez**	**7**	**6**
(South Africa) M Barnard (South Africa) C Haggard	5	3
(Czech Republic) **M Damm** **(South Africa) R Koenig**	**7**	**6**
(Spain) JI Carrasco (Spain) J Velasco	5	4
3	(South Africa) **D Adams** **(South Africa) J-L de Jager**	**7**	**6**
(Argentina) M Rodríguez (South Africa) P Rosner	6	2
(Hungary) **G Köves** **(United States) J Thomas**	**7**	3
(United States) M Keil (Sweden) P Nyborg	6	0^{r}
2	(South Africa) **E Ferreira** **(United States) J Tarango**	**6**	**6**
(Netherlands) S Groen (Croatia) G Ivanišević	3	4

Quarterfinals
1	(France) **O Delaître** **(United States) J Tarango**	**7**	**6**
(Switzerland) G Bastl (Czech Republic) P Luxa	5	3
4	(United States) **D Johnson** **(Czech Republic) C Suk**	**7**	**6**
(France) N Escudé (France) J Hanquez	3
(Czech Republic) M Damm (South Africa) R Koenig	6	6
3	(South Africa) **D Adams** **(South Africa) J-L de Jager**	**7**	**7**
(Hungary) G Köves (United States) J Thomas	0	5
2	(South Africa) **E Ferreira** **(United States) J Tarango**	**6**	**7**

Semifinals
1	(France) **O Delaître** **(United States) J Tarango**	**6**	6	**6**
4	(United States) D Johnson (Czech Republic) C Suk	4	**7**	3
3	(South Africa) **D Adams** **(South Africa) J-L de Jager**	**7**	4	**6**
2	(South Africa) E Ferreira (United States) J Tarango	6	**6**	3

Final
1	(France) **O Delaître** **(United States) J Tarango**	3	**7**	**6**
3	(South Africa) D Adams (South Africa) J-L de Jager	**6**	6	4
