= 1998 Grand Prix de Tennis de Toulouse – Singles =

Singles
- 1998 Grand Prix de Tennis de Toulouse

Final
- Champion: (Netherlands) Jan Siemerink
- Runner-up: (United Kingdom) Greg Rusedski
- Score: 6–4, 6–4

Details
- Draw: 32 (2WC/4Q/2LL)
- Seeds: 8

Events
Singles	Doubles
← 1997 ·	Grand Prix de Tennis de Toulouse	· 1999 →

The 1998 Grand Prix de Tennis de Toulouse was a men's tennis tournament played on indoor hard in Toulouse, France that was part of the International Series of the 1998 ATP Tour. It was the seventeenth edition of the tournament and was held from 28 September – 4 October.

Nicolas Kiefer was the defending champion, but lost in the semifinals to Greg Rusedski.

Jan Siemerink won the title by defeating Greg Rusedski 6–4, 6–4 in the final.

This tournament was notable for being where future 20-time Grand Slam champion and world No. 1 Roger Federer recorded his first match win.

== Seeds ==
Champion seeds are indicated in bold text while text in italics indicates the round in which those seeds were eliminated.

1. (United Kingdom) Greg Rusedski (final)
2. (Netherlands) **Jan Siemerink (champion)**
3. (Sweden) Thomas Johansson (semifinals)
4. (Germany) Nicolas Kiefer (semifinals)
5. (France) Fabrice Santoro (first round)
6. (Sweden) Magnus Larsson (first round)
7. (Australia) Richard Fromberg (second round)
8. Unknown (withdrew)

== Draw ==
=== Key ===
- Q = Qualifier
- WC = Wild card
- LL = Lucky loser
- Alt = Alternate
- SE = Special exempt
- PR = Protected ranking
- ITF = ITF entry
- JE = Junior exempt
- w/o = Walkover
- r = Retired
- d = Defaulted
- SR = Special ranking

=== Finals ===
Semifinals
1	**(United Kingdom) Greg Rusedski**	**6**	**6**
4	(Germany) Nicolas Kiefer	4	1
3	(Sweden) Thomas Johansson	3	**6**	5
2	**(Netherlands) Jan Siemerink**	**6**	3	**7**

Final
1	(United Kingdom) Greg Rusedski	4	4
2	**(Netherlands) Jan Siemerink**	**6**	**6**

=== Top half ===
First round
1	**(United Kingdom) G Rusedski**	**7**	**7**
(Germany) M-K Goellner	6^{5}	6^{3}
**(Ukraine) A Medvedev**	**6**	6^{5}	**6**
WC	(France) J-P Perlant	4	**7**	4
**(France) A Clément**	**7**	3	**6**
(France) S Grosjean	6^{4}	**6**	4
LL	**(Germany) M Sinner**	**6**	**6**
(Netherlands) P Haarhuis	2	4
4	**(Germany) N Kiefer**	**6**	**6**
Q	(France) J Boutter	1	2
Q	**(France) L Barthez**	**7**	**6**
(Germany) C Vinck	6^{7}	2
**(United States) J Tarango**	4	**6**	**6**
LL	(Switzerland) I Heuberger	**6**	1	4
**(Switzerland) M Rosset**	4	**6**	**6**
5	(France) F Santoro	**6**	2	3

Second round
1	**(United Kingdom) G Rusedski**	**6**	**6**
(Ukraine) A Medvedev	4	3
**(France) A Clément**	**6**	4	**7**
LL	(Germany) M Sinner	3	**6**	6^{1}
4	**(Germany) N Kiefer**	4	**6**	**6**
Q	(France) L Barthez	**6**	3	1
(United States) J Tarango	3	4
**(Switzerland) M Rosset**	**6**	**6**

Quarterfinals
1	**(United Kingdom) G Rusedski**	**6**	**6**
(France) A Clément	4	1
4	**(Germany) N Kiefer**	**6**	3	**6**
(Switzerland) M Rosset	3	**6**	1

Semifinals
1	**(United Kingdom) G Rusedski**	**6**	**6**
4	(Germany) N Kiefer	4	1

=== Bottom half ===
First round
Q	**(France) S Huet**	**7**	**7**
6	(Sweden) M Larsson	5	5
**(Armenia) S Sargsian**	**6**	**7**
(France) L Roux	3	6^{5}
**(Czech Republic) D Vacek**	**7**	**6**
(Italy) G Pozzi	6^{2}	4
3	**(Sweden) T Johansson**	**7**	**7**
WC	(France) A Di Pasquale	6^{6}	5
7	**(Australia) R Fromberg**	**6**	**6**
(Italy) D Sanguinetti	4	4
Q	**(Switzerland) R Federer**	**6**	**6**
(France) G Raoux	2	2
**(France) J Golmard**	**6**	**7**
(Germany) D Prinosil	4	6^{4}
2	**(Netherlands) J Siemerink**	**6**	**6**
(Argentina) G Cañas	3	4

Second round
Q	**(France) S Huet**	**7**	6^{5}	**6**
(Armenia) S Sargsian	5	**7**	3
(Czech Republic) D Vacek	4	3
3	**(Sweden) T Johansson**	**6**	**6**
7	(Australia) R Fromberg	1	6^{5}
Q	**(Switzerland) R Federer**	**6**	**7**
(France) J Golmard	**6**	3	4
2	**(Netherlands) J Siemerink**	3	**6**	**6**

Quarterfinals
Q	(France) S Huet	**6**	4	5
3	**(Sweden) T Johansson**	3	**6**	**7**
Q	(Switzerland) R Federer	6^{5}	2
2	**(Netherlands) J Siemerink**	**7**	**6**

Semifinals
3	(Sweden) T Johansson	3	**6**	5
2	**(Netherlands) J Siemerink**	**6**	3	**7**

== Qualifying ==
=== Qualifying seeds ===
All seeds receive a bye into the second round.

1. (Germany) Martin Sinner (qualifying competition, **lucky loser**)
2. (Switzerland) Ivo Heuberger (qualifying competition, **lucky loser**)
3. (Germany) Alex Rădulescu (second round)
4. (Czech Republic) Petr Luxa (qualifying competition)
5. (Federal Republic of Yugoslavia) Nenad Zimonjić (second round)
6. (France) Olivier Delaître (qualifying competition)
7. (France) Régis Lavergne (second round)
8. (France) **Julien Boutter (qualified)**

=== Qualifiers ===
1. (France) **Julien Boutter**
2. (France) **Stéphane Huet**
3. (Switzerland) **Roger Federer**
4. (France) **Lionel Barthez**

=== Lucky losers ===
1. (Germany) **Martin Sinner**
2. (Switzerland) **Ivo Heuberger**

=== Qualifying draw ===
==== First qualifier ====
First round
**(France) Sébastien de Chaunac**	4	**6**	**6**
WC	(France) Mathieu Cordelier	**6**	3	2
(Argentina) José María Arnedo	2	3
**(France) Guillaume Marx**	**6**	**6**

Second round
1	**(Germany) Martin Sinner**	**6**	**6**
(France) Sébastien de Chaunac	4	4
(France) Guillaume Marx	6	6
8	**(France) Julien Boutter**	**7**	**7**

Qualifying competition
1	(Germany) Martin Sinner	3	**6**	4
8	**(France) Julien Boutter**	**6**	3	**6**

==== Second qualifier ====
First round
(North Macedonia) Aleksandar Kitinov	2	3
**(South Africa) David Adams**	**6**	**6**
**(France) Stéphane Huet**	**6**	**6**
(France) Vincent Lavergne	2	4

Second round
2	**(Switzerland) Ivo Heuberger**	4	**6**	**7**
(South Africa) David Adams	**6**	1	6
**(France) Stéphane Huet**	**7**	**6**
7	(France) Régis Lavergne	5	2

Qualifying competition
2	(Switzerland) Ivo Heuberger	0	**6**	2
**(France) Stéphane Huet**	**6**	0	**6**

==== Third qualifier ====
First round
(Argentina) Marcello Wowk	6	2
**(Switzerland) Roger Federer**	**7**	**6**
**(France) Jérôme Hanquez**	**6**	**7**
(France) Gregory Zavialoff	4	6

Second round
3	(Germany) Alex Rădulescu	6	6
**(Switzerland) Roger Federer**	**7**	**7**
(France) Jérôme Hanquez	0	1
6	**(France) Olivier Delaître**	**6**	**6**

Qualifying competition
**(Switzerland) Roger Federer**	**6**	**6**
6	(France) Olivier Delaître	4	4

==== Fourth qualifier ====
First round
(Poland) Aleksander Mierzwiński	6	2
WC	**(France) Romain Ambert**	**7**	**6**
**(France) Lionel Barthez**	**6**	**7**
(Sweden) Peter Nyborg	3	6

Second round
4	**(Czech Republic) Petr Luxa**	**6**	**6**
WC	(France) Romain Ambert	4	2
**(France) Lionel Barthez**	**6**	**7**
5	(Federal Republic of Yugoslavia) Nenad Zimonjić	2	5

Qualifying competition
4	(Czech Republic) Petr Luxa	**6**	4	1
**(France) Lionel Barthez**	3	**6**	**6**
