= 1995 Grand Prix de Tennis de Toulouse – Singles =

Singles
- 1995 Grand Prix de Tennis de Toulouse

Final
- Champion: (France) Arnaud Boetsch
- Runner-up: (United States) Jim Courier
- Score: 6–4, 6–7, 6–0

Details
- Draw: 32
- Seeds: 8

Events
Singles	Doubles
← 1994 ·	Grand Prix de Tennis de Toulouse	· 1996 →

The 1995 Grand Prix de Tennis de Toulouse was a men's tennis tournament played on indoor hard courts in Toulouse, France that was part of the World Series of the 1995 ATP Tour. It was the fourteenth edition of the tournament and was held from 2 October until 8 October 1995. Fourth-seeded Arnaud Boetsch won the singles title, defeating top-seeded Jim Courier in the final in three sets, 6–4, 6–7, 6–0.

== Seeds ==
Champion seeds are indicated in bold text while text in italics indicates the round in which those seeds were eliminated.

1. (United States) Jim Courier (final)
2. (Switzerland) Marc Rosset (semifinals)
3. (Netherlands) Jan Siemerink (first round, retired)
4. (France) **Arnaud Boetsch (champion)**
5. (Germany) Bernd Karbacher (first round)
6. (Sweden) Jonas Björkman (second round)
7. (Argentina) Javier Frana (first round)
8. (France) Guy Forget (first round)

== Draw ==
=== Key ===
- Q = Qualifier
- WC = Wild card
- LL = Lucky loser
- Alt = Alternate
- SE = Special exempt
- PR = Protected ranking
- ITF = ITF entry
- JE = Junior exempt
- w/o = Walkover
- r = Retired
- d = Defaulted
- SR = Special ranking

=== Finals ===
Semifinals
1	**(United States) Jim Courier**	**7**	**6**
(France) Cédric Pioline	6	4
4	**(France) Arnaud Boetsch**	3	**7**	**6**
2	(Switzerland) Marc Rosset	**6**	6	4

Final
1	(United States) Jim Courier	4	**7**	0
4	**(France) Arnaud Boetsch**	**6**	6	**6**

=== Top half ===
First round
1	**(United States) J Courier**	**6**	6	**6**
(Czech Republic) M Damm	3	**7**	4
**(France) R Gilbert**	**6**	0	**7**
(France) O Delaître	3	**6**	6
**(Peru) J Yzaga**	**6**	6	**6**
(France) J Golmard	4	**7**	4
**(Slovakia) K Kučera**	**7**	**6**
8	(France) G Forget	6	3
**(Belgium) J Van Herck**	4
3	(Netherlands) J Siemerink	5^{r}
**(Czech Republic) D Vacek**	4	**6**	**7**
(France) L Roux	**6**	1	5
**(France) C Pioline**	4	**6**	**6**
(France) G Raoux	**6**	4	4
**(France) N Escudé**	**7**	**6**
5	(Germany) B Karbacher	6	2

Second round
1	**(United States) J Courier**	**6**	**6**
(France) Rodolphe Gilbert	4	4
(Peru) J Yzaga	3	4
**(Slovakia) K Kučera**	**6**	**6**
(Belgium) J Van Herck	3	6
**(Czech Republic) D Vacek**	**6**	**7**
**(France) C Pioline**	**6**	**6**
(France) N Escudé	3	3

Quarterfinals
1	**(United States) J Courier**	**6**	**6**
(Slovakia) K Kučera	1	2
(Czech Republic) D Vacek	4	3
**(France) C Pioline**	**6**	**6**

Semifinals
1	**(United States) J Courier**	**7**	**6**
(France) C Pioline	6	4

=== Bottom half ===
First round
6	**(Sweden) J Björkman**	3	**7**	**6**
(United Kingdom) G Rusedski	**6**	6	2
**(Belgium) F Dewulf**	**6**	**6**
(Germany) M Sinner	2	2
**(Italy) S Pescosolido**	**7**	2	**7**
(Germany) D Prinosil	6	**6**	6
4	**(France) A Boetsch**	**6**	**6**
(Russia) A Chesnokov	3	4
**(United States) J Palmer**	**7**	**7**
7	(Argentina) J Frana	6	6
**(France) F Santoro**	**6**	**6**
(France) L Barthez	4	3
**(United States) R Reneberg**	5	**6**	**6**
(Ivory Coast) C N'Goran	**7**	4	1
2	**(Switzerland) M Rosset**	**6**	**7**
(Belgium) D Norman	2	6

Second round
6	(Sweden) J Björkman	6	**6**	3
**(Belgium) F Dewulf**	**7**	4	**6**
(Italy) S Pescosolido	**7**	5	1
4	**(France) A Boetsch**	6	**7**	**6**
**(United States) J Palmer**	6	**7**	**7**
(France) F Santoro	**7**	5	6
(United States) R Reneberg	**7**	1	4
2	**(Switzerland) M Rosset**	6	**6**	**6**

Quarterfinals
(Belgium) F Dewulf	2	4
4	**(France) A Boetsch**	**6**	**6**
(United States) J Palmer	6	3
2	**(Switzerland) M Rosset**	**7**	**6**

Semifinals
4	**(France) A Boetsch**	3	**7**	**6**
2	(Switzerland) M Rosset	**6**	6	4
