= 1993 Grand Prix de Tennis de Toulouse – Doubles =

Doubles
- 1993 Grand Prix de Tennis de Toulouse

Final
- Champions: (Zimbabwe) Byron Black (United States) Jonathan Stark
- Runners-up: (Germany) David Prinosil (Germany) Udo Riglewski
- Score: 7–5, 7–6

Events
Singles	Doubles
← 1992 ·	Grand Prix de Tennis de Toulouse	· 1994 →

The 1993 Grand Prix de Tennis de Toulouse was a men's tennis tournament played on an indoor carpet in Toulouse, France that was part of the World Series of the 1993 ATP Tour. It was the twelfth edition of the tournament and was held from 4 October – 10 October.

== Seeds ==
Champion seeds are indicated in bold text while text in italics indicates the round in which those seeds were eliminated.

1. (Netherlands) Tom Nijssen / (Czech Republic) Cyril Suk (first round)
2. (United States) Steve DeVries / (Australia) David Macpherson (quarterfinals)
3. (Zimbabwe) **Byron Black** / (United States) **Jonathan Stark (champion)**
4. (South Africa) Gary Muller / (South Africa) Danie Visser (semifinals)

== Draw ==
=== Key ===
- Q = Qualifier
- WC = Wild card
- LL = Lucky loser
- Alt = Alternate
- SE = Special exempt
- PR = Protected ranking
- ITF = ITF entry
- JE = Junior exempt
- w/o = Walkover
- r = Retired
- d = Defaulted
- SR = Special ranking

=== Finals ===
First round
1	(Netherlands) T Nijssen (Czech Republic) C Suk	**7**	4	3
(France) **A Boetsch** **(France) O Delaître**	6	**6**	**6**
(South Africa) **J-L de Jager** **(South Africa) M Ondruska**	**6**	**7**
(Netherlands) HJ Davids (South Africa) P Norval	4	6
3	(Zimbabwe) **B Black** **(United States) J Stark**	4	**6**	**7**
(United States) S Cannon (United States) S Melville	**6**	1	6
(United States) **B Pearce** **(United States) D Randall**	3	**6**	**7**
(Latvia) Ģ Dzelde (Sweden) P Nyborg	**6**	3	5
(Netherlands) **M Oosting** **(Netherlands) J Siemerink**	**7**	**6**
(Russia) A Olhovskiy (Czech Republic) L Pimek	6	4
4	(South Africa) **G Muller** **(South Africa) D Visser**	**6**	**7**
(France) H Leconte (Switzerland) M Rosset	4	6
(Germany) **D Prinosil** **(Germany) U Riglewski**	**7**	**6**
(South Africa) S Kruger (India) L Paes	5	4
(United Kingdom) N Broad (South Africa) B Talbot	6	3
2	(United States) **S DeVries** **(Australia) D Macpherson**	**7**	**6**

Quarterfinals
(France) **A Boetsch** **(France) O Delaître**	2	**6**	**6**
(South Africa) J-L de Jager (South Africa) M Ondruska	**6**	2	2
3	(Zimbabwe) **B Black** **(United States) J Stark**	**7**	5	**6**
(United States) B Pearce (United States) D Randall	6	**7**	4
(Netherlands) M Oosting (Netherlands) J Siemerink	3	1
4	(South Africa) **G Muller** **(South Africa) D Visser**	**6**	**6**
(Germany) **D Prinosil** **(Germany) U Riglewski**	**6**	**7**
2	(United States) S DeVries (Australia) D Macpherson	4	6

Semifinals
(France) A Boetsch (France) O Delaître	5	3
3	(Zimbabwe) **B Black** **(United States) J Stark**	**7**	**6**
4	(South Africa) G Muller (South Africa) D Visser	**7**	3	6
(Germany) **D Prinosil** **(Germany) U Riglewski**	6	**6**	**7**

Final
3	(Zimbabwe) **B Black** **(United States) J Stark**	**7**	**7**
(Germany) D Prinosil (Germany) U Riglewski	5	6
