= 1997 Grand Prix de Tennis de Toulouse – Doubles =

Doubles
- 1997 Grand Prix de Tennis de Toulouse

Final
- Champions: (Netherlands) Jacco Eltingh (Netherlands) Paul Haarhuis
- Runners-up: (France) Jean-Philippe Fleurian (Belarus) Max Mirnyi
- Score: 6–3, 7–6

Events
Singles	Doubles
← 1996 ·	Grand Prix de Tennis de Toulouse	· 1998 →

The 1997 Grand Prix de Tennis de Toulouse was a men's tennis tournament played on Indoor Hard in Toulouse, France that was part of the World Series of the 1997 ATP Tour. It was the sixteenth edition of the tournament and was held from 22 September – 28 September.

== Seeds ==
Champion seeds are indicated in bold text while text in italics indicates the round in which those seeds were eliminated.

1. (Netherlands) **Jacco Eltingh** / (Netherlands) **Paul Haarhuis (champions)**
2. (South Africa) David Adams / (France) Olivier Delaître (first round)
3. (Czech Republic) Pavel Vízner / (Netherlands) Fernon Wibier (first round)
4. (Netherlands) Tom Kempers / (Netherlands) Menno Oosting (first round)

== Draw ==
=== Key ===
- Q = Qualifier
- WC = Wild card
- LL = Lucky loser
- Alt = Alternate
- SE = Special exempt
- PR = Protected ranking
- ITF = ITF entry
- JE = Junior exempt
- w/o = Walkover
- r = Retired
- d = Defaulted
- SR = Special ranking

=== Finals ===
First round
1	(Netherlands) **J Eltingh** **(Netherlands) P Haarhuis**	**6**	**7**
(Germany) N Kiefer (Switzerland) M Rosset	2	5
(France) **A Clément** **(France) S Grosjean**	**6**	**6**
(Netherlands) S Groen (Germany) D Prinosil	3	2
(Sweden) **;P Nyborg** **(South Africa) B Talbot**	**7**	**6**
3	(Czech Republic) P Vízner (Netherlands) F Wibier	6	4
(Mexico) **D Roditi** **(Czech Republic) T Anzari**	6	**6**	**6**
(United States) J Gimelstob (Germany) T Haas	**7**	3	4
(South Africa) **M Barnard** **(Netherlands) T Nijssen**	**7**	4	**6**
(Sweden) P Fredriksson (Netherlands) S Schalken	5	**6**	3
(France) **L Barthez** **(Ivory Coast) C N'Goran**	**6**	**7**
4	(Netherlands) T Kempers (Netherlands) M Oosting	4	6
(France) **G Raoux** **(France) F Santoro**	**6**	**6**
(Netherlands) S Noteboom (Netherlands) J Siemerink	4	4
(France) **J-P Fleurian** **(Belarus) M Mirnyi**	3	**7**	**6**
2	(South Africa) D Adams (France) O Delaître	**6**	6	4

Quarterfinals
1	(Netherlands) **J Eltingh** **(Netherlands) P Haarhuis**	**7**	**7**
(France) A Clément (France) S Grosjean	6	5
(Sweden) ;P Nyborg (South Africa) B Talbot	3	5
(Mexico) **D Roditi** **(Czech Republic) T Anzari**	**6**	**7**
(South Africa) **M Barnard** **(Netherlands) T Nijssen**	5	**7**	**6**
(France) L Barthez (Ivory Coast) C N'Goran	**7**	6	4
(France) G Raoux (France) F Santoro	**6**	3	6
(France) **J-P Fleurian** **(Belarus) M Mirnyi**	3	**6**	**7**

Semifinals
1	(Netherlands) **J Eltingh** **(Netherlands) P Haarhuis**	**6**	**6**
(Mexico) D Roditi (Czech Republic) T Anzari	3	1
(South Africa) M Barnard (Netherlands) T Nijssen	2	3
(France) **J-P Fleurian** **(Belarus) M Mirnyi**	**6**	**6**

Final
1	(Netherlands) **J Eltingh** **(Netherlands) P Haarhuis**	**6**	**7**
(France) J-P Fleurian (Belarus) M Mirnyi	3	6
