= 1993 Open 13 – Doubles =

Doubles
- 1993 Open 13

Final
- Champions: (France) Arnaud Boetsch (France) Olivier Delaître
- Runners-up: (United States) Ivan Lendl (South Africa) Christo van Rensburg
- Score: 6–3, 7–6

Events
Singles	Doubles
Open 13	· 1994 →

This was the first edition of the event.

Arnaud Boetsch and Olivier Delaître won the title, defeating Ivan Lendl and Christo van Rensburg 6–3, 7–6 in the final.

== Seeds ==
1. (Netherlands) Tom Nijssen / (Czech Republic) Cyril Suk (first round)
2. (United States) Steve DeVries / (Australia) David Macpherson (first round)
3. (Germany) Boris Becker / (Switzerland) Jakob Hlasek (first round)
4. (Germany) Patrik Kühnen / (Italy) Diego Nargiso (quarterfinals)

== Draw ==
=== Key ===
- Q = Qualifier
- WC = Wild card
- LL = Lucky loser
- Alt = Alternate
- SE = Special exempt
- PR = Protected ranking
- ITF = ITF entry
- JE = Junior exempt
- w/o = Walkover
- r = Retired
- d = Defaulted
- SR = Special ranking

=== Draw ===
First round
1	(Netherlands) T Nijssen (Czech Republic) C Suk	4	4
(Czech Republic) V Flégl (Netherlands) J Siemerink	6	6
(Sweden) J Donar (Sweden) O Jonsson	4	4
WC	(United States) I Lendl (South Africa) C van Rensburg	6	6
3	(Germany) B Becker (Switzerland) J Hlasek	6	6
(France) H Leconte (Switzerland) M Rosset	7	7
(Uruguay) D Pérez (Croatia) G Prpić	3	6
(Netherlands) M Oosting (Germany) U Riglewski	6	7
(South Africa) R Deppe (South Africa) B Haygarth	6	1
WC	(France) A Boetsch (France) O Delaître	7	6
(Sweden) H Holm (Norway) B-O Pedersen	3	6	4
4	(Germany) P Kühnen (Italy) D Nargiso	6	4	6
Q	(France) S Simian (Germany) A Thoms	6	6
(Netherlands) S Groen (Finland) O Rahnasto	4	3
(Czech Republic) M Damm (Czech Republic) T Anzari	6	4	6
2	(United States) S Devries (Australia) D Macpherson	3	6	2

Quarterfinals
(Czech Republic) V Flégl (Netherlands) J Siemerink	2	3
WC	(United States) I Lendl (South Africa) C van Rensburg	6	6
(France) H Leconte (Switzerland) M Rosset	7	7
(Netherlands) M Oosting (Germany) U Riglewski	6	6
WC	(France) A Boetsch (France) O Delaître	6	6
4	(Germany) P Kühnen (Italy) D Nargiso	3	2
Q	(France) S Simian (Germany) A Thoms	4	1
(Czech Republic) M Damm (Czech Republic) T Anzari	6	6

Semifinals
WC	(United States) I Lendl (South Africa) C van Rensburg	6	4	7
(France) H Leconte (Switzerland) M Rosset	2	6	6
WC	(France) A Boetsch (France) O Delaître	7	7
(Czech Republic) M Damm (Czech Republic) T Anzari	5	6

Final
WC	(United States) I Lendl (South Africa) C van Rensburg	3	6
WC	(France) A Boetsch (France) O Delaître	6	7
