= 1997 Grand Prix de Tennis de Toulouse – Singles =

Singles
- 1997 Grand Prix de Tennis de Toulouse

Final
- Champion: (Germany) Nicolas Kiefer
- Runner-up: (Australia) Mark Philippoussis
- Score: 7–5, 5–7, 6–4

Details
- Draw: 32
- Seeds: 8

Events
Singles	Doubles
← 1996 ·	Grand Prix de Tennis de Toulouse	· 1998 →

The 1997 Grand Prix de Tennis de Toulouse was a men's tennis tournament played on indoor hard courts in Toulouse, France. It was part of the World Series of the 1997 ATP Tour. It was the sixteenth edition of the tournament and was held from 22 September until 28 September 1997.

== Seeds ==
Champion seeds are indicated in bold text while text in italics indicates the round in which those seeds were eliminated.

1. (Spain) Albert Costa (first round)
2. (United Kingdom) Tim Henman (second round)
3. (Australia) Mark Philippoussis (final)
4. (Switzerland) Marc Rosset (first round)
5. (Sweden) Magnus Larsson (second round)
6. (France) Fabrice Santoro (second round)
7. (Netherlands) Jan Siemerink (second round)
8. (France) Guillaume Raoux (quarterfinals)

== Draw ==
=== Key ===
- Q = Qualifier
- WC = Wild card
- LL = Lucky loser
- Alt = Alternate
- SE = Special exempt
- PR = Protected ranking
- ITF = ITF entry
- JE = Junior exempt
- w/o = Walkover
- r = Retired
- d = Defaulted
- SR = Special ranking

=== Finals ===
Semifinals
(United States) Vince Spadea	5	4
3	**(Australia) Mark Philippoussis**	**7**	**6**
(Germany) Alex Rădulescu	3	**6**	6
**(Germany) Nicolas Kiefer**	**6**	2	**7**

Final
3	(Australia) Mark Philippoussis	5	**7**	4
**(Germany) Nicolas Kiefer**	**7**	5	**6**

=== Top half ===
First round
**(Netherlands) P Haarhuis**	**7**	**6**
1	(Spain) A Costa	6	2
**(United States) V Spadea**	**7**	**6**
(Italy) R Furlan	6	4
**(United States) J Gimelstob**	**7**	**7**
(Germany) M Sinner	6	6
7	**(Netherlands) J Siemerink**	**6**	**6**
(France) S Grosjean	3	1
3	**(Australia) M Philippoussis**	**6**	**7**
(France) N Thomann	4	6
**(France) L Roux**	**7**	**6**
(Netherlands) S Schalken	6	4
**(France) A Clément**	**6**	**6**
(Germany) D Prinosil	4	4
5	**(Sweden) M Larsson**	**6**	**6**
(Italy) G Pozzi	3	4

Second round
(Netherlands) P Haarhuis	5	1
**(United States) V Spadea**	**7**	**6**
**(United States) J Gimelstob**	3	**7**	**6**
7	(Netherlands) J Siemerink	**6**	6	0
3	**(Australia) M Philippoussis**	**6**	6	**6**
(France) L Roux	3	**7**	3
**(France) A Clément**	**7**	3	**6**
5	(Sweden) M Larsson	6	**6**	4

Quarterfinals
**(United States) V Spadea**	**6**	**7**
(United States) J Gimelstob	3	6
3	**(Australia) M Philippoussis**	**7**	3	**7**
(France) A Clément	5	**6**	6

Semifinals
(United States) V Spadea	5	4
3	**(Australia) M Philippoussis**	**7**	**6**

=== Bottom half ===
First round
6	**(France) F Santoro**	3	**7**	**6**
(France) R Lavergne	**6**	6	1
**(Germany) A Rădulescu**	**6**	**7**
(France) N Escudé	4	6
**(Germany) T Haas**	**6**	**6**
(Uzbekistan) O Ogorodov	4	2
**(Sweden) T Nydahl**	**6**	3	**6**
4	(Switzerland) M Rosset	4	**6**	3
8	**(France) G Raoux**	**6**	**6**
(France) O Delaître	3	2
**(Italy) M Martelli**	**6**	**7**
(United Kingdom) C Wilkinson	2	6
**(Germany) N Kiefer**	4	**6**	**6**
(Sweden) P Fredriksson	**6**	3	1
2	**(United Kingdom) T Henman**	**6**	1	**6**
(Czech Republic) D Vacek	4	**6**	3

Second round
6	(France) F Santoro	2	3
**(Germany) A Rădulescu**	**6**	**6**
**(Germany) T Haas**	**6**	**6**
(Sweden) T Nydahl	3	4
8	**(France) G Raoux**	**6**	**6**
(Italy) M Martelli	3	3
**(Germany) N Kiefer**	4	**7**	**6**
2	(United Kingdom) T Henman	**6**	6	2

Quarterfinals
**(Germany) A Rădulescu**	**6**	**6**
(Germany) T Haas	1	4
8	(France) G Raoux	2	**7**	5
**(Germany) N Kiefer**	**6**	6	**7**

Semifinals
(Germany) A Rădulescu	3	**6**	6
**(Germany) N Kiefer**	**6**	2	**7**
