= 1996 Grand Prix de Tennis de Toulouse =

- Date: 14–20 October
- Edition: 15th
- Category: World Series
- Draw: 32S / 16D
- Prize money: $375,000
- Surface: Hard / indoor
- Location: Toulouse, France
- Venue: Palais des Sports de Toulouse

Champions

Singles
- (Australia) Mark Philippoussis

Doubles
- (Netherlands) Jacco Eltingh / (Netherlands) Paul Haarhuis
← 1995 ·	Grand Prix de Tennis de Toulouse	· 1997 →

The 1996 Grand Prix de Tennis de Toulouse was a men's tennis tournament played on indoor hard courts at the Palais des Sports de Toulouse in Toulouse, France, and was part of the World Series of the 1996 ATP Tour. It was the 15th edition of the tournament and took place from 14 October through 20 October 1996. Fourth-seeded Mark Philippoussis won the singles title.

== Finals ==
=== Singles ===
(Australia) Mark Philippoussis defeated (Sweden) Magnus Larsson 6–1, 5–7, 6–4

- It was Philippoussis' only singles title of the year and the 1st of his career.

=== Doubles ===
(Netherlands) Jacco Eltingh / (Netherlands) Paul Haarhuis defeated (France) Olivier Delaître / (France) Guillaume Raoux, 6–3, 7–5

- It was Eltingh's 1st title of the year and the 31st of his career. It was Haarhuis' 2nd title of the year and the 30th of his career.
