= 1996 Grand Prix de Tennis de Toulouse – Doubles =

Doubles
- 1996 Grand Prix de Tennis de Toulouse
- 1995 Champions: (Sweden) Jonas Björkman (South Africa) John-Laffnie de Jager

Final
- Champions: (Netherlands) Jacco Eltingh (Netherlands) Paul Haarhuis
- Runners-up: (France) Olivier Delaître (France) Guillaume Raoux
- Score: 6–3, 7–5

Details
- Draw: 16
- Seeds: 4

Events
Singles	Doubles
← 1995 ·	Grand Prix de Tennis de Toulouse	· 1997 →

Jonas Björkman and John-Laffnie de Jager were the defending champions but did not compete that year.

Jacco Eltingh and Paul Haarhuis won in the final 6–3, 7–5 against Olivier Delaître and Guillaume Raoux.

== Seeds ==
Champion seeds are indicated in bold text while text in italics indicates the round in which those seeds were eliminated.

1. (Netherlands) **Jacco Eltingh** / (Netherlands) **Paul Haarhuis (champions)**
2. (United States) Patrick Galbraith / (United States) Alex O'Brien (first round)
3. (United States) Donald Johnson / (United States) Francisco Montana (semifinals)
4. (South Africa) David Adams / (Netherlands) Hendrik Jan Davids (semifinals)

== Draw ==
=== Key ===
- Q = Qualifier
- WC = Wild card
- LL = Lucky loser
- Alt = Alternate
- SE = Special exempt
- PR = Protected ranking
- ITF = ITF entry
- JE = Junior exempt
- w/o = Walkover
- r = Retired
- d = Defaulted
- SR = Special ranking

First round
1	(Netherlands) **J Eltingh** (Netherlands) **P Haarhuis**	**6**	4	**6**
Q	(Federal Republic of Yugoslavia) N Djordjevic (North Macedonia) A Kitinov	4	**6**	4
(Netherlands) S Noteboom (Netherlands) F Wibier	4	1
(South Africa) **M Barnard** (United States) **D Randall**	**6**	**6**
4	(South Africa) **D Adams** (Netherlands) **H J Davids**	**6**	**7**
WC	(Ivory Coast) Cla N'Goran (Ivory Coast) Cle N'Goran	1	6
(Netherlands) **T Kempers** (Netherlands) **T Nijssen**	**6**	**6**
WC	(France) L Barthez (France) G Bastié	3	4
WC	(France) T Guardiola (France) L Roux	2	4
(Argentina) **P Albano** (France) **F Santoro**	**6**	**6**
(Australia) M Philippoussis (Switzerland) M Rosset
3	(United States) **D Johnson** (United States) **F Montana**	w/o
(Sweden) R Bergh (Latvia) Ģ Dzelde	3	4
(United Kingdom) **N Broad** (Australia) **P Cash**	**6**	**6**
(France) **O Delaître** (France) **G Raoux**	**7**	**7**
2	(United States) P Galbraith (United States) A O'Brien	6	6

Quarterfinals
1	(Netherlands) **J Eltingh** (Netherlands) **P Haarhuis**	**6**	**7**
(South Africa) M Barnard (United States) D Randall	4	6
4	(South Africa) **D Adams** (Netherlands) **H J Davids**	**6**	4	**6**
(Netherlands) T Kempers (Netherlands) T Nijssen	1	**6**	3
(Argentina) P Albano (France) F Santoro	2	**7**	3
3	(United States) **D Johnson** (United States) **F Montana**	**6**	6	**6**
(United Kingdom) N Broad (Australia) P Cash
(France) **O Delaître** (France) **G Raoux**	w/o

Semifinals
1	(Netherlands) **J Eltingh** (Netherlands) **P Haarhuis**	**6**	**7**
4	(South Africa) D Adams (Netherlands) H J Davids	3	5
3	(United States) D Johnson (United States) F Montana	2	**6**	3
(France) **O Delaître** (France) **G Raoux**	**6**	2	**6**

Final
1	(Netherlands) **Jacco Eltingh** (Netherlands) **Paul Haarhuis**	**6**	**7**
(France) Olivier Delaître (France) Guillaume Raoux	3	5
