= 1993 Grand Prix de Tennis de Toulouse – Singles =

Singles
- 1993 Grand Prix de Tennis de Toulouse

Final
- Champion: (France) Arnaud Boetsch
- Runner-up: (France) Cédric Pioline
- Score: 7–6, 3–6, 6–3

Details
- Draw: 32
- Seeds: 8

Events
Singles	Doubles
← 1992 ·	Grand Prix de Tennis de Toulouse	· 1994 →

The 1993 Grand Prix de Tennis de Toulouse was a men's tennis tournament played on indoor carpet courts in Toulouse, France that was part of the World Series of the 1993 ATP Tour. It was the twelfth edition of the tournament and was held from 4 October – 10 October.

== Seeds ==
Champion seeds are indicated in bold text while text in italics indicates the round in which those seeds were eliminated.

1. (Spain) Sergi Bruguera (second round)
2. (France) Cédric Pioline (final)
3. (Sweden) Magnus Gustafsson (quarterfinals)
4. (Switzerland) Marc Rosset (quarterfinals)
5. (France) **Arnaud Boetsch (champion)**
6. (Russia) Andrei Chesnokov (semifinals)
7. (Germany) Marc-Kevin Goellner (first round)
8. (South Africa) Marcos Ondruska (second round)

== Draw ==
Key

- Q = Qualifier
- WC = Wild card
- LL = Lucky loser
- Alt = Alternate
- ITF = ITF entry
- PR = Protected ranking
- SR = Special ranking
- SE = Special exempt
- JE = Junior exempt
- JR = Junior Accelerator Programme entrant
- CO = College Accelerator Programme entrant
- NG = Next Gen Accelerator Program entrant
- w/o = Walkover
- r = Retired
- d = Defaulted

=== Finals ===
Semifinals
(Sweden) Christian Bergström	1	2
5	**(France) Arnaud Boetsch**	**6**	**6**
6	(Russia) Andrei Chesnokov	4	2
2	**(France) Cédric Pioline**	**6**	**6**

Final
5	**(France) Arnaud Boetsch**	**7**	3	**6**
2	(France) Cédric Pioline	6	**6**	3

=== Top half ===
First round
1	**(Spain) S Bruguera**	**6**	**6**
(Russia) A Olhovskiy	2	2
**(Morocco) Y El Aynaoui**	**7**	**6**
Q	(Sweden) T Enqvist	6	2
**(Sweden) C Bergström**	**6**	1	**6**
(Denmark) K Carlsen	3	**6**	4
WC	**(India) L Paes**	3	**7**	**6**
7	(Germany) M-K Goellner	**6**	6	4
3	**(Sweden) M Gustafsson**	**6**	3	3
Q	(Sweden) T Högstedt	3	**6**	1^{r}
**(France) G Raoux**	**6**	**6**
Q	(Netherlands) T Nijssen	4	0
**(United States) J Stark**	**6**	**7**
(Netherlands) J Siemerink	4	6
5	**(France) A Boetsch**	**7**	**6**
(Switzerland) J Hlasek	5	3

Second round
1	(Spain) S Bruguera	4	**6**	**7**
**(Morocco) Y El Aynaoui**	**6**	3	6
**(Sweden) C Bergström**	1	**7**	**6**
WC	(India) L Paes	**6**	6	4
3	**(Sweden) M Gustafsson**	6	**6**	**7**
(France) G Raoux	**7**	3	6
(United States) J Stark	**6**	3	0
5	**(France) A Boetsch**	3	**6**	**6**

Quarterfinals
(Morocco) Y El Aynaoui	4	3
**(Sweden) C Bergström**	**6**	**6**
3	(Sweden) M Gustafsson	2	3
5	**(France) A Boetsch**	**6**	**6**

Semifinals
(Sweden) C Bergström	1	2
5	**(France) A Boetsch**	**6**	**6**

=== Bottom half ===
First round
6	**(Russia) A Chesnokov**	**6**	**6**
(France) F Santoro	2	3
**(Germany) D Prinosil**	**6**	**6**
(Austria) A Antonitsch	3	2
**(France) S Simian**	**6**	**6**
(France) T Champion	2	3
4	**(Switzerland) M Rosset**	**6**	**6**
(France) H Leconte	1	2
8	**(South Africa) M Ondruska**	**6**	3	**6**
Q	(Netherlands) HJ Davids	1	**6**	1
WC	**(France) R Gilbert**	**7**	**7**
(Italy) G Pozzi	6	5
**(United States) J Tarango**	3	**7**	**6**
(Sweden) N Kulti	**6**	5	3
2	**(France) C Pioline**	**7**	**6**
WC	(Sweden) M Wilander	5	3

Second round
6	**(Russia) A Chesnokov**	3	**6**	**6**
(Germany) D Prinosil	**6**	3	0
(France) S Simian	4	4
4	**(Switzerland) M Rosset**	**6**	**6**
8	(South Africa) M Ondruska	5	**6**	4
WC	**(France) R Gilbert**	**7**	3	**6**
(United States) J Tarango	1	6
2	**(France) C Pioline**	**6**	**7**

Quarterfinals
6	**(Russia) A Chesnokov**	**6**	**7**
4	(Switzerland) M Rosset	4	6
WC	(France) R Gilbert	**7**	5	2
2	**(France) C Pioline**	5	**7**	**6**

Semifinals
6	(Russia) A Chesnokov	4	2
2	**(France) C Pioline**	**6**	**6**
