= 1993 Grand Prix de Tennis de Toulouse =

- Date: 4–10 October
- Edition: 12th
- Category: World Series
- Draw: 32S / 16D
- Prize money: $375,000
- Surface: Carpet / indoor
- Location: Toulouse, France

Champions

Singles
- (France) Arnaud Boetsch

Doubles
- (Zimbabwe) Byron Black / (United States) Jonathan Stark
← 1992 ·	Grand Prix de Tennis de Toulouse	· 1994 →

The 1993 Grand Prix de Tennis de Toulouse was a men's tennis tournament played on indoor carpet courts in Toulouse, France that was part of the World Series of the 1993 ATP Tour. It was the twelfth edition of the tournament and was held from 4 October until 10 October 1993. Fifth-seeded Arnaud Boetsch won the singles title.

== Finals ==
=== Singles ===
(France) Arnaud Boetsch defeated (France) Cédric Pioline, 7–6, 3–6, 6–3

- It was Boetsch's 2nd and last singles title of the year and the 2nd of his career.

=== Doubles ===
(Zimbabwe) Byron Black / (United States) Jonathan Stark defeated (Germany) David Prinosil / (Germany) Udo Riglewski, 7–5, 7–6
