= 1992 Grand Prix de Tennis de Toulouse – Singles =

Singles
- 1992 Grand Prix de Tennis de Toulouse

Final
- Champion: (France) Guy Forget
- Runner-up: (Czechoslovakia) Petr Korda
- Score: 6–3, 6–2

Details
- Draw: 32
- Seeds: 8

Events
Singles	Doubles
← 1991 ·	Grand Prix de Tennis de Toulouse	· 1993 →

The 1992 Grand Prix de Tennis de Toulouse was a men's tennis tournament played on indoor carpet courts in Toulouse, France that was part of the World Series of the 1992 ATP Tour. It was the eleventh edition of the tournament and was held from 5 October until 11 October 1992.

== Seeds ==
Champion seeds are indicated in bold text while text in italics indicates the round in which those seeds were eliminated.

1. (Czechoslovakia) Petr Korda (final)
2. (France) **Guy Forget (champion)**
3. (United States) Brad Gilbert (quarterfinals)
4. (Israel) Amos Mansdorf (second round)
5. (West Germany) Carl-Uwe Steeb (first round)
6. (Commonwealth of Independent States) Andrei Cherkasov (first round)
7. (Commonwealth of Independent States) Andriy Medvedev (quarterfinals)
8. (Italy) Omar Camporese (second round)

== Draw ==
=== Key ===
- Q = Qualifier
- WC = Wild card
- LL = Lucky loser
- Alt = Alternate
- ITF = ITF entry
- PR = Protected ranking
- SR = Special ranking
- SE = Special exempt
- JE = Junior exempt
- JR = Junior Accelerator Programme entrant
- CO = College Accelerator Programme entrant
- NG = Next Gen Accelerator Program entrant
- w/o = Walkover
- r = Retired
- d = Defaulted

=== Finals ===
Semifinals
1	**(Czechoslovakia) Petr Korda**	**7**	**6**
(Netherlands) Jan Siemerink	6	3
(France) Arnaud Boetsch	3	4
2	**(France) Guy Forget**	**6**	**6**

Final
1	(Czechoslovakia) Petr Korda	3	2
2	**(France) Guy Forget**	**6**	**6**

=== Top half ===
First round
1	**(Czechoslovakia) P Korda**	**6**	**6**
(Sweden) T Högstedt	4	1
Q	**(France) L Roux**	**6**	**6**
WC	(Sweden) B Borg	0	4
**(Sweden) J Svensson**	**6**	**6**
(Italy) S Pescosolido	4	2
8	**(Italy) O Camporese**	2	**6**	**6**
WC	(France) H Leconte	**6**	3	4
3	**(United States) B Gilbert**	3	**6**	**6**
(Argentina) C Miniussi	**6**	4	1
WC	**(France) R Gilbert**	**6**	**6**
(Sweden) N Kulti	3	4
**(Switzerland) M Rosset**	**6**	**7**
(France) O Delaître	1	6
**(Netherlands) J Siemerink**	**7**	6	**7**
5	(Germany) C-U Steeb	6	**7**	6

Second round
1	**(Czechoslovakia) P Korda**	6	**7**	**6**
Q	(France) L Roux	**7**	5	4
**(Sweden) J Svensson**	**6**	**6**
8	(Italy) O Camporese	3	4
3	**(United States) B Gilbert**	**6**	**6**
WC	(France) R Gilbert	3	4
(Switzerland) M Rosset	**6**	4	4
**(Netherlands) J Siemerink**	4	**6**	**6**

Quarterfinals
1	**(Czechoslovakia) P Korda**	3	**6**	**6**
(Sweden) J Svensson	**6**	0	1
3	(United States) B Gilbert	4	6
**(Netherlands) J Siemerink**	**6**	**7**

Semifinals
1	**(Czechoslovakia) P Korda**	**7**	**6**
(Netherlands) J Siemerink	6	3

=== Bottom half ===
First round
**(France) Cédric Pioline**	4	**6**	**6**
6	(Commonwealth of Independent States) A Cherkasov	**6**	4	1
**(France) A Boetsch**	**6**	**6**
(Commonwealth of Independent States) A Chesnokov	3	2
**(Sweden) C Bergström**	**7**	**6**
(Switzerland) J Hlasek	6	2
4	**(Israel) A Mansdorf**	**6**	**6**
(Argentina) A Mancini	0	3
7	**(Commonwealth of Independent States) A Medvedev**	**6**	6	**6**
Q	(Germany) T Gollwitzer	2	**7**	4
Q	**(France) P Gauthier**	**6**	**6**
Q	(France) O Soules	3	3
**(France) F Santoro**	**6**	**7**
(United States) J Tarango	3	6
2	**(France) G Forget**	**6**	3	**7**
(Netherlands) M Schapers	3	**6**	5

Second round
(France) Cédric Pioline	2	2
**(France) A Boetsch**	**6**	**6**
**(Sweden) C Bergström**	**6**	6	**6**
4	(Israel) A Mansdorf	1	**7**	4
7	**(Commonwealth of Independent States) A Medvedev**	**6**	**7**
Q	(France) P Gauthier	4	5
(France) F Santoro	**7**	1	4
2	**(France) G Forget**	6	**6**	**6**

Quarterfinals
**(France) A Boetsch**	**6**	**6**
(Sweden) C Bergström	3	2
7	(Commonwealth of Independent States) A Medvedev	3	6
2	**(France) G Forget**	**6**	**7**

Semifinals
(France) A Boetsch	3	4
2	**(France) G Forget**	**6**	**6**
