= 1998 Grand Prix de Tennis de Toulouse =

- Date: 28 September – 4 October
- Edition: 17th
- Category: World Series
- Draw: 32S / 16D
- Prize money: $375,000
- Surface: Hard / indoor
- Location: Toulouse, France

Champions

Singles
- (Netherlands) Jan Siemerink

Doubles
- (France) Olivier Delaître / (France) Fabrice Santoro
← 1997 ·	Grand Prix de Tennis de Toulouse	· 1999 →

The 1998 Grand Prix de Tennis de Toulouse was a men's tennis tournament played on indoor hard courts in Toulouse, France that was part of the World Series of the 1998 ATP Tour. It was the seventeenth edition of the tournament and was held from 28 September until 4 October 1998. Second-seeded Jan Siemerink won the singles title.

== Finals ==
=== Singles ===
(Netherlands) Jan Siemerink defeated (United Kingdom) Greg Rusedski, 6–4, 6–4

- It was Siemerink's 2nd singles title of the year and the 4th and last of his career.

=== Doubles ===
(France) Olivier Delaître / (France) Fabrice Santoro defeated (Netherlands) Paul Haarhuis / (Netherlands) Jan Siemerink, 6–2, 6–4
