= 1992 Grand Prix de Tennis de Toulouse – Doubles =

Doubles
- 1992 Grand Prix de Tennis de Toulouse

Final
- Champions: (United States) Brad Pearce (South Africa) Byron Talbot
- Runners-up: (France) Guy Forget (France) Henri Leconte
- Score: 6–1, 3–6, 6–3

Events
Singles	Doubles
← 1991 ·	Grand Prix de Tennis de Toulouse	· 1993 →

The 1992 Grand Prix de Tennis de Toulouse was a men's tennis tournament played on indoor carpet in Toulouse, France that was part of the World Series of the 1992 ATP Tour. It was the eleventh edition of the tournament and was held from 5 October until 11 October 1992.

== Seeds ==
Champion seeds are indicated in bold text while text in italics indicates the round in which those seeds were eliminated.

1. (Netherlands) Tom Nijssen / (Czechoslovakia) Cyril Suk (first round)
2. (Netherlands) Hendrik Jan Davids / (Czechoslovakia) Libor Pimek (first round)
3. (United States) Shelby Cannon / (United States) Greg Van Emburgh (quarterfinals)
4. (United States) Mike Briggs / (United States) Trevor Kronemann (first round)

== Draw ==
=== Key ===
- Q = Qualifier
- WC = Wild card
- LL = Lucky loser
- Alt = Alternate
- SE = Special exempt
- PR = Protected ranking
- ITF = ITF entry
- JE = Junior exempt
- w/o = Walkover
- r = Retired
- d = Defaulted
- SR = Special ranking

=== Finals ===
First round
(United States) **B Pearce** **(South Africa) B Talbot**	6	**7**	**6**
1	(Netherlands) T Nijssen (Czechoslovakia) C Suk	**7**	6	4
(Commonwealth of Independent States) **A Chesnokov** **(France) L Prades**	**6**	**7**
(United States) L Keil (United States) D Randall	4	6
3	(United States) **S Cannon** **(United States) G Van Emburgh**	**6**	**6**
(Spain) JC Báguena (Italy) S Pescosolido	4	4
(United Kingdom) **N Broad** **(South Africa) S Kruger**	**6**	**6**
(Sweden) B Borg (United Kingdom) J Lloyd	4	1
(Commonwealth of Independent States) **A Cherkasov** **(Latvia) Ģ Dzelde**	**6**	**6**
(Netherlands) M Schapers (Netherlands) J Siemerink	2	4
(France) **G Forget** **(France) H Leconte**	3	**6**	**6**
4	(United States) M Briggs (United States) T Kronemann	**6**	2	2
(Argentina) **G Luza** **(Switzerland) M Rosset**	**6**	6	**6**
(France) A Boetsch (France) O Delaître	3	**7**	4
(Netherlands) **M Oosting** **(Germany) U Riglewski**	**6**	3	**6**
2	(Netherlands) HJ Davids (Czechoslovakia) L Pimek	4	**6**	4

Quarterfinals
(United States) **B Pearce** **(South Africa) B Talbot**	5	**7**	**7**
(Commonwealth of Independent States) A Chesnokov (France) L Prades	**7**	5	6
3	(United States) S Cannon (United States) G Van Emburgh	3	2
(United Kingdom) **N Broad** **(South Africa) S Kruger**	**6**	**6**
(Commonwealth of Independent States) A Cherkasov (Latvia) Ģ Dzelde	2	6
(France) **G Forget** **(France) H Leconte**	**6**	**7**
(Argentina) G Luza (Switzerland) M Rosset	4	**6**	4
(Netherlands) **M Oosting** **(Germany) U Riglewski**	**6**	3	**6**

Semifinals
(United States) **B Pearce** **(South Africa) B Talbot**	**6**	**6**
(United Kingdom) N Broad (South Africa) S Kruger	2	2
(France) **G Forget** **(France) H Leconte**	**6**	**7**
(Netherlands) M Oosting (Germany) U Riglewski	1	6

Final
(United States) **B Pearce** **(South Africa) B Talbot**	**6**	3	**6**
(France) G Forget (France) H Leconte	1	**6**	3
