= 1993 Open 13 – Singles =

Singles
- 1993 Open 13

Final
- Champion: (Switzerland) Marc Rosset
- Runner-up: (Netherlands) Jan Siemerink
- Score: 6–2, 7–6^{(7–1)}

Details
- Draw: 32 (4 Q / 3 WC )
- Seeds: 8

Events
Singles	Doubles
Open 13	· 1994 →

Marc Rosset defeated Jan Siemerink 6–2, 7–6^{(7–1)} to win the 1993 Open 13 singles event.

== Seeds ==
1. (United States) Ivan Lendl (second round)
2. (Spain) Sergi Bruguera (quarterfinals)
3. (Sweden) Henrik Holm (semifinals)
4. (Israel) Amos Mansdorf (second round)
5. (France) Arnaud Boetsch (quarterfinals)
6. (Switzerland) Marc Rosset (champion)
7. (Switzerland) Jakob Hlasek (semifinals)
8. (Netherlands) Jan Siemerink (final)

== Draws ==
=== Key ===
- Q = Qualifier
- WC = Wild card
- LL = Lucky loser
- Alt = Alternate
- SE = Special exempt
- PR = Protected ranking
- ITF = ITF entry
- JE = Junior exempt
- w/o = Walkover
- r = Retired
- d = Defaulted
- SR = Special ranking

=== Final ===
Semifinals
8	(Netherlands) Jan Siemerink	7^{7}	7^{7}
3	(Sweden) Henrik Holm	6^{4}	6^{2}
6	(Switzerland) Marc Rosset	6	6
7	(Switzerland) Jakob Hlasek	2	4

Final
8	(Netherlands) Jan Siemerink	2	6^{1}
6	(Switzerland) Marc Rosset	6	7^{7}

=== Section 1 ===
First round
1	(United States) I Lendl	6	6
(Denmark) K Carlsen	3	4
(Italy) G Pozzi	1	7^{7}	7^{7}
(Italy) D Nargiso	6	6^{4}	6^{3}
Q	(France) S Sansoni	5	3
(Canada) C Pridham	7	6
(Germany) P Baur	6^{2}	0^{r}
8	(Netherlands) J Siemerink	7^{7}	2
3	(Sweden) H Holm	7	6^{3}	7^{7}
(Haiti) R Agénor	5	7^{7}	6^{3}
(Germany) P Kühnen	7^{8}	6
Q	(Netherlands) T Nijssen	6^{6}	3
(Germany) A Thoms	7^{7}	6
WC	(France) T Guardiola	6^{4}	1
(Austria) H Skoff	7	1	0^{r}
5	(France) A Boetsch	5	6	1

Second round
1	(United States) I Lendl	4	7	4
(Italy) G Pozzi	6	5	6
(Canada) C Pridham	2	5
8	(Netherlands) J Siemerink	6	7
3	(Sweden) H Holm	6	7^{7}
(Germany) P Kühnen	2	7^{5}
(Germany) A Thoms	6^{4}	1
5	(France) A Boetsch	7^{7}	6

Quarterfinals
(Italy) G Pozzi	3	3
8	(Netherlands) J Siemerink	6	6
3	(Sweden) H Holm	3	6	6
5	(France) A Boetsch	6	4	0

Semifinals
8	(Netherlands) J Siemerink	7^{7}	7^{7}
3	(Sweden) H Holm	6^{4}	6^{2}

=== Section 2 ===
First round
6	(Switzerland) M Rosset	7^{11}	6^{3}	7^{7}
(France) S Simian	6^{9}	7^{7}	6^{3}
(France) H Leconte	6	6
(South Africa) C van Rensburg	2	3
WC	(France) L Roux	3	2
(France) R Gilbert	6	6
Q	(Sweden) M Stadling	4	2
4	(Israel) A Mansdorf	6	6
7	(Switzerland) J Hlasek	7^{7}	6
(France) O Delaître	6^{5}	1
Q	(France) S Huet	1	4
(Croatia) G Prpić	6	6
(France) G Raoux	6	6
(Italy) S Pescosolido	4	3
(Czech Republic) M Damm	6	3	5
WC/2	(Spain) S Bruguera	3	6	7

Second round
6	(Switzerland) M Rosset	6	6
(France) H Leconte	4	4
(France) R Gilbert	6	6
4	(Israel) A Mansdorf	3	0
7	(Switzerland) J Hlasek	3	6	6
(Croatia) G Prpić	6	4	1
(France) G Raoux	4	7	4
WC/2	(Spain) S Bruguera	6	5	6

Quarterfinals
6	(Switzerland) M Rosset	6	6
(France) R Gilbert	4	4
7	(Switzerland) J Hlasek	7^{7}	6^{5}	6
WC/2	(Spain) S Bruguera	6^{2}	7^{7}	1

Semifinals
6	(Switzerland) M Rosset	6	6
7	(Switzerland) J Hlasek	2	4
