= 1994 Marseille Open – Singles =

Singles
- 1994 Marseille Open

Final
- Champion: (Switzerland) Marc Rosset
- Runner-up: (France) Arnaud Boetsch
- Score: 7–6^{(8–6)}, 7–6^{(7–4)}

Details
- Draw: 32 (4 Q / 2 WC )
- Seeds: 8

Events
| Singles | Doubles |
| ← 1993 · | Marseille Open | · 1995 → |

Marc Rosset defended his title, defeating Arnaud Boetsch 7–6^{(8–6)}, 7–6^{(7–4)}.

== Seeds ==
1. (Germany) Michael Stich (quarterfinals)
2. (France) Cédric Pioline (first round)
3. (Germany) Boris Becker (second round)
4. (Switzerland) Marc Rosset (champion)
5. (France) Arnaud Boetsch (final)
6. (Spain) Carlos Costa (first round, retired)
7. (Israel) Amos Mansdorf (first round)
8. (Spain) Alberto Berasategui (first round)

== Draws ==
Key

- Q = Qualifier
- WC = Wild card
- LL = Lucky loser
- Alt = Alternate
- ITF = ITF entry
- PR = Protected ranking
- SR = Special ranking
- SE = Special exempt
- JE = Junior exempt
- JR = Junior Accelerator Programme entrant
- CO = College Accelerator Programme entrant
- NG = Next Gen Accelerator Program entrant
- w/o = Walkover
- r = Retired
- d = Defaulted

=== Finals ===
Semifinals
1 | (Germany) M Stich | 2 | 6 | 4
4 | (Switzerland) M Rosset | 6 | 2 | 6
5 | (France) A Boetsch | 7^{7} | 6
Q | (Italy) D Nargiso | 6^{3} | 3

Final
4 | (Switzerland) M Rosset | 7^{8} | 7^{7}
5 | (France) A Boetsch | 6^{6} | 6^{4}

=== Section 1 ===
First round
1 | (Germany) M Stich | 6^{3} | 7 | 6
(Haiti) R Agénor | 7^{7} | 6^{4} | 3
(Russia) A Olhovskiy | 6^{4} | 3
(France) O Delaître | 7^{7} | 6
(Sweden) J Björkman | 6 | 6
Q | (Czech Republic) D Vacek | 4 | 3
(France) G Raoux | 6 | 7^{7}
7 | (Israel) A Mansdorf | 2 | 6^{4}
4 | (Switzerland) M Rosset | 6 | 6
(Austria) A Antonitsch | 4 | 3
(Switzerland) J Hlasek | 6 | 6
(France) R Gilbert | 4 | 2
(Czech Republic) D Rikl | 7 | 6
WC | (India) L Paes | 5 | 4
(Germany) C-U Steeb | 6 | 3
6 | (Spain) C Costa | 4 | 2^{r}

Second round
1 | (Germany) M Stich | 6 | 7^{7}
(France) O Delaître | 3 | 6^{3}
(Sweden) J Björkman | 6 | 3 | 7^{7}
(France) G Raoux | 2 | 6 | 6^{3}
4 | (Switzerland) M Rosset | 6 | 6
(Switzerland) J Hlasek | 2 | 3
(Czech Republic) D Rikl | 7 | 7^{8}
(Germany) C-U Steeb | 5 | 6^{6}

Quarter-Finals
1 | (Germany) M Stich | 7 | 7^{9}
(Sweden) J Björkman | 5 | 6^{7}
4 | (Switzerland) M Rosset | 7^{7} | 7
(Czech Republic) D Rikl | 6^{4} | 5

Semi-Finals
1 | (Germany) M Stich | 2 | 6 | 4
4 | (Switzerland) M Rosset | 6 | 2 | 6

=== Section 2 ===
First round
5 | (France) A Boetsch | 6 | 6
Q | (Sweden) M Stadling | 2 | 4
(France) S Simian | 6 | 6^{2} | 7^{7}
(Russia) Y Kafelnikov | 3 | 7^{7} | 6^{5}
(France) H Leconte | 6 | 6
WC | (France) T Champion | 1 | 3
(United Kingdom) J Bates | 2 | 4
3 | (Germany) B Becker | 6 | 6
8 | (Spain) A Berasategui | 1 | 4
Q | (Germany) J Renzenbrink | 6 | 6
(Italy) O Camporese | 4 | 3
(Spain) T Carbonell | 6 | 6
(Netherlands) J Siermerink | 4 | 2
(Czech Republic) M Damm | 6 | 6
Q | (Italy) D Nargiso | 3 | 6 | 6
2 | (France) C Pioline | 6 | 3 | 4

Second round
5 | (France) A Boetsch | 6 | 7^{10}
(France) S Simian | 4 | 6^{8}
(France) H Leconte | 4 | 6 | 6
3 | (Germany) B Becker | 6 | 2 | 1
Q | (Germany) J Renzenbrink | 4 | 6 | 4
(Spain) T Carbonell | 6 | 2 | 6
(Czech Republic) M Damm | 3 | 5
Q | (Italy) D Nargiso | 6 | 7

Quarter-Finals
5 | (France) A Boetsch | 6 | 6
(France) H Leconte | 2 | 4
(Spain) T Carbonell | 1 | 6^{7}
Q | (Italy) D Nargiso | 6 | 7^{9}

Semi-Finals
5 | (France) A Boetsch | 6 | 7^{7}
Q | (Italy) D Nargiso | 3 | 6^{3}
