= 1993 Open 13 =

- Date: 1–8 February
- Edition: 1st
- Category: ATP World Series
- Draw: 32S / 16D
- Prize money: $500,000
- Surface: Carpet / indoor
- Location: Marseille, France
- Venue: Palais des Sports de Marseille

Champions

Singles
- (Switzerland) Marc Rosset

Doubles
- (France) Arnaud Boetsch / (France) Olivier Delaître
- Open 13

The 1993 Open 13 was a men's tennis tournament played on indoor carpet courts and held at the Palais des Sports de Marseille in Marseille, France. It was the inaugural edition of the tournament which was held from 1 February until 8 February 1993. Sixth-seeded Marc Rosset won the singles title.

== Finals ==
=== Singles ===
(Switzerland) Marc Rosset defeated (Netherlands) Jan Siemerink 6–2, 7–6^{(7–1)}

- It was Rosset's 1st title of the year and the 10th of his career.

=== Doubles ===
(France) Arnaud Boetsch / (France) Olivier Delaître defeated (United States) Ivan Lendl / (South Africa) Christo van Rensburg 6–3, 7–6

- It was Boetsch's 1st title of the year and the 2nd of his career. It was Delaître's 2nd title of the year and the 5th of his career.
