= 2000 Adidas Open de Toulouse =

- Date: 16–22 October
- Edition: 20th
- Category: International Series 2
- Draw: 32S / 16D
- Prize money: $375,000
- Surface: Hard / indoor
- Location: Toulouse, France

Champions

Singles
- (Spain) Àlex Corretja

Doubles
- (France) Julien Boutter / (France) Fabrice Santoro
← 1999 ·	Grand Prix de Tennis de Toulouse

The 2000 Adidas Open de Toulouse was a men's tennis tournament played on indoor hard courts in Toulouse, France that was part of the International Series 2 of the 2000 ATP Tour. It was the twentieth and final edition of the tournament and was held from 16 until 22 October 2000. First-seeded Àlex Corretja won the singles title.

== Finals ==
=== Singles ===
(Spain) Àlex Corretja defeated (Spain) Carlos Moyá, 6–3, 6–2

=== Doubles ===
(France) Julien Boutter / (France) Fabrice Santoro defeated (United States) Donald Johnson / (South Africa) Piet Norval, 7–6^{(10–8)}, 4–6, 7–6^{(7–5)}
