= 1994 Marseille Open =

Tennis tournament

- Date: 31 January – 6 February
- Edition: 2nd
- Category: ATP World Series
- Draw: 32S / 16D
- Prize money: $513,750
- Surface: Carpet / Indoor
- Location: Marseille, France venue=Palais des Sports de Marseille

Champions

Singles
- (Switzerland) Marc Rosset

Doubles
- (Netherlands) Jan Siemerink / (Czech Republic) Daniel Vacek
- Marseille Open

The 1994 Marseille Open was an ATP tennis tournament played on indoor carpet and held at the Palais des Sports de Marseille in Marseille, France, from 31 January through 6 February 1994. It was the second edition of the tournament and it was part of the ATP World Series. Fourth-seeded Marc Rosset won the singles title, successfully defending his title from 1993.

== Finals ==
=== Singles ===
(Switzerland) Marc Rosset defeated (France) Arnaud Boetsch 7–6^{(8–6)}, 7–6^{(7–4)}

- It was Rosset's first singles title of the year and the 8th of his career.

=== Doubles ===
(Netherlands) Jan Siemerink / (Czech Republic) Daniel Vacek defeated (Czech Republic) Martin Damm / (Russia) Yevgeny Kafelnikov 6–7, 6–4, 6–1

- It was Siemerink's 1st title of the year and the 4th of his career. It was Vacek's 1st title of the year and the 5th of his career.
