= 1995 Grand Prix de Tennis de Toulouse =

- Date: 2–8 October
- Edition: 14th
- Category: World Series
- Draw: 32S / 16D
- Prize money: $375,000
- Surface: Hard / indoor
- Location: Toulouse, France

Champions

Singles
- (France) Arnaud Boetsch

Doubles
- (Sweden) Jonas Björkman / (South Africa) John-Laffnie de Jager
- Grand Prix de Tennis de Toulouse

The 1995 Grand Prix de Tennis de Toulouse was a men's tennis tournament played on indoor hard courts in Toulouse, France, that was part of the World Series of the 1995 ATP Tour. It was the fourteenth edition of the tournament and was held from 2 October until 8 October 1995. Fourth-seeded Arnaud Boetsch won the singles title.

== Finals ==
=== Singles ===
(France) Arnaud Boetsch defeated (United States) Jim Courier, 6–4, 6–7, 6–0

=== Doubles ===
(Sweden) Jonas Björkman / (South Africa) John-Laffnie de Jager defeated (United States) Dave Randall / (United States) Greg Van Emburgh, 7–6, 7–6
