= 1999 Adidas Open de Toulouse =

- Date: 27 September – 3 October
- Edition: 18th
- Category: World Series
- Draw: 32S / 16D
- Prize money: $375,000
- Surface: Hard / indoor
- Location: Toulouse, France

Champions

Singles
- (France) Nicolas Escudé

Doubles
- (France) Olivier Delaître / (United States) Jeff Tarango
← 1998 ·	Grand Prix de Tennis de Toulouse	· 2000 →

The 1999 Adidas Open de Toulouse was a men's tennis tournament played on indoor hard courts in Toulouse, France that was part of the World Series of the 1999 ATP Tour. It was the eighteenth edition of the tournament and was held from 27 September until 3 October 1999. Unseeded Nicolas Escudé won the singles title.

== Finals ==
=== Singles ===
(France) Nicolas Escudé defeated (Czech Republic) Daniel Vacek, 7–5, 6–1

- It was Escudé's first singles title of his career.

=== Doubles ===
(France) Olivier Delaître / (United States) Jeff Tarango defeated (South Africa) David Adams / (South Africa) John-Laffnie de Jager, 3–6, 7–6, 6–4
