= 2000 Adidas Open de Toulouse – Singles =

Singles
- 2000 Adidas Open de Toulouse

Final
- Champion: (Spain) Àlex Corretja
- Runner-up: (Spain) Carlos Moyá
- Score: 6–3, 6–2

Details
- Draw: 32 (3WC/4Q/2LL)
- Seeds: 8

Events
Singles	Doubles
- Grand Prix de Tennis de Toulouse

The 2000 Adidas Open de Toulouse was a men's tennis tournament played on Indoor Hard in Toulouse, France that was part of the International Series 2 of the 2000 ATP Tour. It was the twentieth and final edition of the tournament and was held from 16 October until 22 October 2000.

== Seeds ==
Champion seeds are indicated in bold text while text in italics indicates the round in which those seeds were eliminated.

1. (Spain) **Àlex Corretja (champion)**
2. (Spain) Juan Carlos Ferrero (first round)
3. (Chile) Marcelo Ríos (semifinals)
4. (Morocco) Younes El Aynaoui (first round)
5. (United States) Jan-Michael Gambill (quarterfinals)
6. (France) ~~Arnaud Clément~~ (withdrew)
7. (France) ~~Sébastien Grosjean~~ (withdrew)
8. (Spain) Albert Costa (first round)

== Draw ==
Key

- Q = Qualifier
- WC = Wild card
- LL = Lucky loser
- Alt = Alternate
- ITF = ITF entry
- PR = Protected ranking
- SR = Special ranking
- SE = Special exempt
- JE = Junior exempt
- JR = Junior Accelerator Programme entrant
- CO = College Accelerator Programme entrant
- NG = Next Gen Accelerator Program entrant
- w/o = Walkover
- r = Retired
- d = Defaulted

=== Finals ===
Semifinals
1	**(Spain) Àlex Corretja**	**7**	**6**
3	(Chile) Marcelo Ríos	6^{6}	3
**(Spain) Carlos Moyá**	**6**	**7**
(Belarus) Max Mirnyi	4	6^{4}

Final
1	**(Spain) Àlex Corretja**	**6**	**6**
(Spain) Carlos Moyá	3	2

=== Top half ===
First round
1	**(Spain) À Corretja**	**6**	**6**
(Italy) G Pozzi	1	2
LL	**(Germany) A Popp**	4	**6**	**6**
Q	(France) S Huet	**6**	1	4
**(Sweden) M Tillström**	**6**	3	**6**
WC	(France) N Mahut	3	**6**	3
Q	**(France) J Boutter**	**6**	**6**
8	(Spain) A Costa	2	4
3	**(Chile) M Ríos**	**6**	3	**6**
(Spain) F Vicente	4	**6**	1
**(Morocco) K Alami**	3	**7**	**7**
(France) F Santoro	**6**	5	6^{5}
**(Austria) S Koubek**	**6**	**6**
WC	(France) P-H Mathieu	3	4
LL	**(Spain) JA Viloca**	4	**7**	**6**
(Spain) A Martín	**6**	5	0

Second round
1	**(Spain) À Corretja**	**6**	**6**
LL	(Germany) A Popp	1	4
**(Sweden) M Tillström**	**7**	**6**
Q	(France) J Boutter	6^{3}	4
3	**(Chile) M Ríos**	6^{4}	**6**	**6**
(Morocco) K Alami	**7**	3	4
(Austria) S Koubek	4	6^{0}
LL	**(Spain) JA Viloca**	**6**	**7**

Quarterfinals
1	**(Spain) À Corretja**	**7**	**6**
(Sweden) M Tillström	5	3
3	**(Chile) M Ríos**	**6**	**6**
LL	(Spain) JA Viloca	4	4

Semifinals
1	**(Spain) À Corretja**	**7**	**6**
3	(Chile) M Ríos	6^{6}	3

=== Bottom half ===
First round
5	**(United States) J-M Gambill**	6^{7}	**7**	**6**
(Spain) F Clavet	**7**	6^{6}	3
**(Morocco) H Arazi**	**6**	**6**
(United Kingdom) G Rusedski	3	4
**(Switzerland) M Rosset**	**6**	**7**
Q	(Italy) R Furlan	3	6^{5}
**(Spain) C Moyá**	6^{7}	**6**	**6**
4	(Morocco) Y El Aynaoui	**7**	4	2
**(Belarus) M Mirnyi**	3	R
Q	(Italy) D Nargiso	2
**(Sweden) A Vinciguerra**	6^{3}	**6**	**6**
WC	(France) A Di Pasquale	**7**	3	4
**(France) N Escudé**	**6**	**7**
(Czech Republic) C Doseděl	3	6^{5}
**(Sweden) M Gustafsson**	**6**	**7**
2	(Spain) JC Ferrero	2	6^{9}

Second round
5	**(United States) J-M Gambill**	**6**	**7**
(Morocco) H Arazi	3	5
(Switzerland) M Rosset	6^{4}	**7**	6^{7}
**(Spain) C Moyá**	**7**	6^{5}	**7**
**(Belarus) M Mirnyi**	**6**	**6**
(Sweden) A Vinciguerra	3	0
**(France) Nicolas Escudé**	5	**6**	**6**
(Sweden) M Gustafsson	**7**	3	2

Quarterfinals
5	(United States) J-M Gambill	**7**	6^{10}	4
**(Spain) C Moyá**	6^{4}	**7**	**6**
**(Belarus) M Mirnyi**	3	**7**	**6**
(France) Nicolas Escudé	6	6^{2}	3

Semifinals
**(Spain) C Moyá**	**6**	**7**
(Belarus) M Mirnyi	4	6^{4}
