= 1992 Grand Prix de Tennis de Toulouse =

- Date: 5–11 October
- Edition: 11th
- Category: World Series
- Draw: 32S / 16D
- Prize money: $275,000
- Surface: Carpet / indoor
- Location: Toulouse, France

Champions

Singles
- (France) Guy Forget

Doubles
- (United States) Brad Pearce / (South Africa) Byron Talbot
← 1991 ·	Grand Prix de Tennis de Toulouse	· 1993 →

The 1992 Grand Prix de Tennis de Toulouse was a men's tennis tournament played on indoor carpet courts in Toulouse, France that was part of the World Series of the 1992 ATP Tour. It was the eleventh edition of the tournament and was held from 5 October until 11 October 1992. Second-seeded Guy Forget won the singles title.

== Finals ==
=== Singles ===
(France) Guy Forget defeated (Czechoslovakia) Petr Korda, 6–3, 6–2

=== Doubles ===
(United States) Brad Pearce / (South Africa) Byron Talbot defeated (France) Guy Forget / (France) Henri Leconte, 6–1, 3–6, 6–3
