= 1994 Grand Prix de Tennis de Toulouse =

- Date: 3–9 October
- Edition: 13th
- Category: World Series
- Draw: 32S / 16D
- Prize money: $375,000
- Surface: Hard / indoor
- Location: Toulouse, France

Champions

Singles
- (Sweden) Magnus Larsson

Doubles
- (Netherlands) Menno Oosting / (Czech Republic) Daniel Vacek
- Grand Prix de Tennis de Toulouse

The 1994 Grand Prix de Tennis de Toulouse was a men's tennis tournament played on indoor hard courts in Toulouse, France that was part of the World Series of the 1994 ATP Tour. It was the thirteenth edition of the tournament and was held from 3 October until 9 October 1994. Sixth-seeded Magnus Larsson won the singles title.

== Finals ==
=== Singles ===
(Sweden) Magnus Larsson defeated (United States) Jared Palmer, 6–1, 6–3

=== Doubles ===
(Netherlands) Menno Oosting / (Czech Republic) Daniel Vacek defeated (United States) Patrick McEnroe / (United States) Jared Palmer, 7–6, 6–7, 6–3
