= 1994 Grand Prix de Tennis de Toulouse – Singles =

1994 tennis event

Singles
- 1994 Grand Prix de Tennis de Toulouse

Final
- Champion: (Sweden) Magnus Larsson
- Runner-up: (United States) Jared Palmer
- Score: 6–1, 6–3

Details
- Draw: 32
- Seeds: 8

Events
Singles	Doubles
- Grand Prix de Tennis de Toulouse

The 1994 Grand Prix de Tennis de Toulouse was a men's tennis tournament played on indoor hard courts in Toulouse, France that was part of the World Series of the 1994 ATP Tour. It was the thirteenth edition of the tournament and was held from 3 October until 9 October 1994.

== Seeds ==
Champion seeds are indicated in bold text while text in italics indicates the round in which those seeds were eliminated.

1. (Ukraine) Andriy Medvedev (first round)
2. (Switzerland) Marc Rosset (second round)
3. (France) Arnaud Boetsch (quarterfinals)
4. (France) Cédric Pioline (quarterfinals)
5. (Germany) Bernd Karbacher (semifinals)
6. (Sweden) **Magnus Larsson (champion)**
7. (Russia) Andrei Chesnokov (semifinals)
8. (Russia) Alexander Volkov (first round)

== Draw ==
Key

- Q = Qualifier
- WC = Wild card
- LL = Lucky loser
- Alt = Alternate
- ITF = ITF entry
- PR = Protected ranking
- SR = Special ranking
- SE = Special exempt
- JE = Junior exempt
- JR = Junior Accelerator Programme entrant
- CO = College Accelerator Programme entrant
- NG = Next Gen Accelerator Program entrant
- w/o = Walkover
- r = Retired
- d = Defaulted

=== Finals ===
Semifinals
7	(Russia) Andrei Chesnokov	1	**6**	**6**
6	**(Sweden) Magnus Larsson**	**6**	1	1
5	(Germany) Bernd Karbacher	4	1
**(United States) Jared Palmer**	**6**	**6**

Final
6	**(Sweden) Magnus Larsson**	**6**	**6**
(United States) Jared Palmer	1	3

=== Top half ===
First round
**(France) G Forget**	**6**	**6**
1	(Ukraine) A Medvedev	3	3
**(Czech Republic) D Vacek**	**6**	**6**
Q	(France) P Gauthier	3	4
**(France) F Santoro**	**6**	**6**
(France) J-P Fleurian	4	2
7	**(Russia) A Chesnokov**	**6**	3	**6**
(Germany) K Braasch	4	**6**	2
4	**(France) C Pioline**	1	**6**	**6**
Q	(Sweden) J Apell	**6**	1	2
**(United Kingdom) J Bates**	**7**	**6**
Q	(France) G Raoux	5	1
**(Brazil) L Mattar**	**7**	**6**
(United States) C Adams	6	2
6	**(Sweden) M Larsson**	4	**6**	**6**
(Germany) M-K Goellner	**6**	3	0

Second round
**(France) G Forget**	**7**	4	**7**
(Czech Republic) D Vacek	6	**6**	6
(France) F Santoro	**6**	3	1
7	**(Russia) A Chesnokov**	2	**6**	**6**
4	**(France) C Pioline**	**6**	**6**
(United Kingdom) J Bates	1	1
(Brazil) L Mattar	5	4
6	**(Sweden) M Larsson**	**7**	**6**

Quarterfinals
(France) G Forget	4	**6**	**6**
7	**(Russia) A Chesnokov**	**6**	2	2
4	(France) C Pioline	2	4
6	**(Sweden) M Larsson**	**6**	**6**

Semifinals
7	(Russia) A Chesnokov	1	**6**	**6**
6	**(Sweden) M Larsson**	**6**	1	1

=== Bottom half ===
First round
5	**(Germany) B Karbacher**	**6**	**7**
(United States) P McEnroe	2	5
**(Germany) H Dreekmann**	**6**	**7**
(Israel) A Mansdorf	4	6
**(Germany) A Mronz**	2	**6**	**6**
Q	(Sweden) J Björkman	**6**	3	4
3	**(France) A Boetsch**	**6**	**6**
(Germany) M Zoecke	3	4
**(United States) J Palmer**	3	**6**	**6**
8	(Russia) A Volkov	**6**	4	3
**(Switzerland) J Hlasek**	4	**7**	**6**
(Czech Republic) D Rikl	**6**	5	1
**(France) O Delaître**	**6**	**6**
(France) L Barthez	2	1
2	**(Switzerland) M Rosset**	**6**	**6**
(Haiti) R Agénor	4	4

Second round
5	**(Germany) B Karbacher**	**7**	5	**7**
(Germany) H Dreekmann	5	**7**	5
(Germany) A Mronz	6	6
3	**(France) A Boetsch**	**7**	**7**
**(United States) J Palmer**	**6**	**6**
(Switzerland) J Hlasek	2	1
**(France) O Delaître**	**6**	5	**6**
2	(Switzerland) M Rosset	1	**7**	2

Quarterfinals
5	**(Germany) B Karbacher**	**7**	**6**
3	(France) A Boetsch	6	2
**(United States) J Palmer**	4	**7**	**7**
(France) O Delaître	**6**	6	5

Semifinals
5	(Germany) B Karbacher	4	1
**(United States) J Palmer**	**6**	**6**
