= 1997 Grand Prix de Tennis de Toulouse =

- Date: 22–28 September
- Edition: 16th
- Category: World Series
- Draw: 32S / 16D
- Prize money: $375,000
- Surface: Hard / indoor
- Location: Toulouse, France

Champions

Singles
- (Germany) Nicolas Kiefer

Doubles
- (Netherlands) Jacco Eltingh / (Netherlands) Paul Haarhuis
← 1996 ·	Grand Prix de Tennis de Toulouse	· 1998 →

The 1997 Grand Prix de Tennis de Toulouse was a men's tennis tournament played on indoor hard courts in Toulouse, France that was part of the World Series of the 1997 ATP Tour. It was the 16th edition of the tournament and was held from 22 September until 28 September 1997. Unseeded Nicolas Kiefer won the singles title.

== Finals ==
=== Singles ===
(Germany) Nicolas Kiefer defeated (Australia) Mark Philippoussis, 7–5, 5–7, 6–4

=== Doubles ===
(Netherlands) Jacco Eltingh / (Netherlands) Paul Haarhuis defeated (France) Jean-Philippe Fleurian / (Belarus) Max Mirnyi, 6–3, 7–6
