= 1996 Grand Prix de Tennis de Toulouse – Singles =

Singles
- 1996 Grand Prix de Tennis de Toulouse

Final
- Champion: (Australia) Mark Philippoussis
- Runner-up: (Sweden) Magnus Larsson
- Score: 6–1, 5–7, 6–4

Details
- Draw: 32
- Seeds: 8

Events
Singles	Doubles
← 1995 ·	Grand Prix de Tennis de Toulouse	· 1997 →

Arnaud Boetsch was the defending champion but lost in the first round to Bernd Karbacher.

Mark Philippoussis won in the final 6–1, 5–7, 6–4 against Magnus Larsson.

== Seeds ==
A champion seed is indicated in bold text while text in italics indicates the round in which that seed was eliminated.

1. (Chile) Marcelo Ríos (semifinals)
2. (France) Cédric Pioline (quarterfinals)
3. (France) Arnaud Boetsch (first round)
4. (Australia) **Mark Philippoussis (champion)**
5. (Switzerland) Marc Rosset (second round)
6. (Netherlands) Paul Haarhuis (first round)
7. (Australia) Mark Woodforde (semifinals)
8. n/a

== Draw ==
=== Key ===
- Q = Qualifier
- WC = Wild card
- LL = Lucky loser
- Alt = Alternate
- SE = Special exempt
- PR = Protected ranking
- ITF = ITF entry
- JE = Junior exempt
- w/o = Walkover
- r = Retired
- d = Defaulted
- SR = Special ranking

First round
WC/1	(Chile) **M Ríos**	**5**
Q	(France) F Vitoux	2	r
(France) **L Roux**	**6**	**6**
(Italy) A Gaudenzi	2	3
(United States) A O'Brien	2	**6**	6^{5}
Q	(Bulgaria) **O Stanoytchev**	**6**	4	**7^{7}**
Q	(France) O Mutis	1	**6**	4
LL	(France) **T Guardiola**	**6**	4	**6**
3	(France) A Boetsch	**6**	2	3
(Germany) **B Karbacher**	2	**6**	**6**
(Belgium) **F Dewulf**	3	**6**	**6**
(Spain) E Benfele Álvarez	**6**	4	3
(Sweden) **M Larsson**	**6**	**6**
(France) T Champion	1	0
(Spain) J A Viloca	2	2
5	(Switzerland) **M Rosset**	**6**	**6**
6	(Netherlands) P Haarhuis	**6**	3	3
Q	(Netherlands) **J Eltingh**	4	**6**	**6**
(Morocco) **H Arazi**	**6**	**6**
(Spain) J Burillo	3	4
(France) G Forget	6^{6}	**6**	1
(France) **G Raoux**	**7^{8}**	3	**6**
WC	(France) F Santoro	3	**6**	6^{1}
4	(Australia) **M Philippoussis**	**6**	3	**7^{7}**
7	(Australia) **M Woodforde**	**6**	3	**6**
(Morocco) Y El Aynaoui	3	**6**	3
(Russia) A Chesnokov	4	2
(Sweden) **T Johansson**	**6**	**6**
(Spain) **S Bruguera**	4	**7^{7}**	**7^{7}**
(Netherlands) S Schalken	**6**	6^{3}	6^{3}
WC	(France) O Delaître	**6**	3	2
2	(France) **C Pioline**	4	**6**	**6**

Second round
WC/1	(Chile) **M Ríos**	**6**	**6**
(France) L Roux	2	2
Q	(Bulgaria) **O Stanoytchev**	5	**7**	**6**
LL	(France) T Guardiola	**7**	5	3
(Germany) **B Karbacher**	**6**	**7^{12}**
(Belgium) F Dewulf	4	6^{10}
(Sweden) **M Larsson**	**w/o**
5	(Switzerland) M Rosset
Q	(Netherlands) J Eltingh	**7^{7}**	3	2
(Morocco) **H Arazi**	6^{2}	**6**	**6**
(France) G Raoux	6^{2}	**7^{7}**	4
4	(Australia) **M Philippoussis**	**7^{7}**	6^{2}	**6**
7	(Australia) **M Woodforde**	**6**	**7^{7}**
(Sweden) T Johansson	3	6^{3}
(Spain) S Bruguera	4	4
2	(France) **C Pioline**	**6**	**6**

Quarterfinals
WC/1	(Chile) **M Ríos**	**7^{9}**	**6**
Q	(Bulgaria) O Stanoytchev	6^{7}	3
(Germany) B Karbacher	1	6^{2}
(Sweden) **M Larsson**	**6**	**7^{7}**
(Morocco) H Arazi	4	**6**	6^{5}
4	(Australia) **M Philippoussis**	**6**	3	**7^{7}**
7	(Australia) **M Woodforde**	**6**	**6**
2	(France) C Pioline	4	3

Semifinals
WC/1	(Chile) M Ríos	4	4
(Sweden) **M Larsson**	**6**	**6**
4	(Australia) **M Philippoussis**	2	**7^{7}**	**7^{9}**
7	(Australia) M Woodforde	**6**	6^{5}	6^{7}

Final
(Sweden) Magnus Larsson	1	**7**	4
4	(Australia) **M Philippoussis**	**6**	5	**6**
