= 2000 Adidas Open de Toulouse – Doubles =

Doubles
- 2000 Adidas Open de Toulouse

Final
- Champions: (France) Julien Boutter (France) Fabrice Santoro
- Runners-up: (United States) Donald Johnson (South Africa) Piet Norval
- Score: 7–6^{(10–8)}, 4–6, 7–6^{(7–5)}

Details
- Draw: 16 (3WC/1Q/1LL)
- Seeds: 4

Events
Singles	Doubles
- Grand Prix de Tennis de Toulouse

The 2000 Adidas Open de Toulouse was a men's tennis tournament played on Indoor Hard in Toulouse, France that was part of the International Series 2 of the 2000 ATP Tour. It was the twentieth and final edition of the tournament and was held from 16 October until 22 October 2000.

== Seeds ==
Champion seeds are indicated in bold text while text in italics indicates the round in which those seeds were eliminated.

1. (South Africa) David Adams / (Sweden) Mikael Tillström (first round)
2. (Australia) Joshua Eagle / (Australia) Andrew Florent (first round)
3. (United States) Donald Johnson / (South Africa) Piet Norval (final)
4. (Spain) Juan Ignacio Carrasco / (Australia) Sandon Stolle (first round)

== Draw ==
Key

- Q = Qualifier
- WC = Wild card
- LL = Lucky loser
- Alt = Alternate
- ITF = ITF entry
- PR = Protected ranking
- SR = Special ranking
- SE = Special exempt
- JE = Junior exempt
- JR = Junior Accelerator Programme entrant
- CO = College Accelerator Programme entrant
- NG = Next Gen Accelerator Program entrant
- w/o = Walkover
- r = Retired
- d = Defaulted

=== Finals ===
First round
(South Africa) **C Haggard** **(Belgium) T Vanhoudt**	0	**6**	**7**
1	(South Africa) D Adams (Sweden) M Tillström	**6**	4	6^{4}
(Spain) **T Carbonell** **(Argentina) D Orsanic**	6^{5}	**7**	**6**
(Sweden) S Aspelin (Sweden) J Landsberg	**7**	6^{4}	3
3	(United States) **D Johnson** **(South Africa) P Norval**	4	**7**	**6**
WC	(France) N Escudé (France) M Llodra	**6**	6^{4}	4
Q	(South Africa) **P Rosner** **(South Africa) J Weir-Smith**	**6**	**7**
(Czech Republic) D Rikl (Czech Republic) C Suk	1	5
WC	(France) **J Boutter** **(France) F Santoro**	**7**	**6**
LL	(France) L Barthez (Ivory Coast) C N'Goran	6^{4}	1
(United States) **J-M Gambill** **(United States) S Humphries**	6^{2}	**6**	**7**
4	(Spain) JI Carrasco (Australia) S Stolle	**7**	3	6^{4}
(South Africa) **M Barnard** **(South Africa) R Koenig**	2	**6**	**7**
(Italy) M Bertolini (Italy) C Brandi	**6**	2	6^{2}
WC	(Spain) **À Corretja** **(France) A Di Pasquale**	**6**	6^{4}	**6**
2	(Australia) J Eagle (Australia) A Florent	4	**7**	2

Quarterfinals
(South Africa) **C Haggard** **(Belgium) T Vanhoudt**	**7**	6^{4}	**7**
(Spain) T Carbonell (Argentina) D Orsanic	6^{4}	**7**	6^{2}
3	(United States) **D Johnson** **(South Africa) P Norval**	**7**	**7**
Q	(South Africa) P Rosner (South Africa) J Weir-Smith	6^{4}	6^{7}
WC	(France) **J Boutter** **(France) F Santoro**	**7**	6^{6}	**6**
(United States) J-M Gambill (United States) S Humphries	6^{4}	**7**	2
(South Africa) M Barnard (South Africa) R Koenig	6^{5}	1
WC	(Spain) **À Corretja** **(France) A Di Pasquale**	**7**	**6**

Semifinals
(South Africa) C Haggard (Belgium) T Vanhoudt	6^{2}	**7**	6^{3}
3	(United States) **D Johnson** **(South Africa) P Norval**	**7**	5	**7**
WC	(France) **J Boutter** **(France) F Santoro**	**6**
WC	(Spain) À Corretja (France) A Di Pasquale	4	R

Final
3	(United States) D Johnson (South Africa) P Norval	6^{8}	**6**	6^{5}
WC	(France) **J Boutter** **(France) F Santoro**	**7**	4	**7**
