= 1994 Marseille Open – Doubles =

Doubles
- 1994 Marseille Open

Final
- Champions: (Netherlands) Jan Siemerink (Czech Republic) Daniel Vacek
- Runners-up: (Czech Republic) Martin Damm (Russia) Yevgeny Kafelnikov
- Score: 6–7, 6–4, 6–1

Details
- Draw: 16
- Seeds: 4

Events
Singles	Doubles
- Marseille Open

Arnaud Boetsch and Olivier Delaître were the defending champions, but lost in the semifinals this year.

Jan Siemerink and Daniel Vacek won the title, defeating Martin Damm and Yevgeny Kafelnikov 6–7, 6–4, 6–1 in the final.

== Seeds ==
1. (South Africa) David Adams / (Russia) Andrei Olhovskiy (semifinals)
2. (United States) Shelby Cannon / (South Africa) Byron Talbot (first round)
3. (Netherlands) Jan Siemerink / (Czech Republic) Daniel Vacek (champions)
4. (Germany) Udo Riglewski / (Germany) Michael Stich (first round)

== Draw ==
Key

- Q = Qualifier
- WC = Wild card
- LL = Lucky loser
- Alt = Alternate
- ITF = ITF entry
- PR = Protected ranking
- SR = Special ranking
- SE = Special exempt
- JE = Junior exempt
- JR = Junior Accelerator Programme entrant
- CO = College Accelerator Programme entrant
- NG = Next Gen Accelerator Program entrant
- w/o = Walkover
- r = Retired
- d = Defaulted

=== Draw ===
First round
1	(South Africa) D Adams (Russia) A Olhovskiy	6	6
(United States) K Kinnear (United States) G Van Emburgh	3	2
(Netherlands) M Oosting (Norway) B-O Pedersen	3	6	7
(Sweden) J Björkman (Sweden) P Nyborg	6	3	5
4	(Germany) U Riglewski (Germany) M Stich	4	2
(Czech Republic) M Damm (Russia) Y Kafelnikov	6	6
(The Bahamas) M Knowles (India) L Paes	4	1
WC	(Switzerland) J Hlasek (France) C Pioline	6	6
(Spain) C Costa (Spain) T Carbonell	7	6
(Germany) B Becker (Italy) D Nargiso	6	4
Q	(France) R Gilbert (France) S Simian	4	3
3	(Netherlands) J Siemerink (Czech Republic) D Vacek	6	6
(Italy) C Brandi (Netherlands) M Koevermans	3	1
(France) A Boetsch (France) O Delaître	6	6
WC	(France) H Leconte (Switzerland) M Rosset	6	6
2	(United States) S Cannon (South Africa) B Talbot	3	4

Quarterfinals
1	(South Africa) D Adams (Russia) A Olhovskiy	6	7
(Netherlands) M Oosting (Norway) B-O Pedersen	1	5
(Czech Republic) M Damm (Russia) Y Kafelnikov	6	6
WC	(Switzerland) J Hlasek (France) C Pioline	4	4
(Spain) C Costa (Spain) T Carbonell
3	(Netherlands) J Siemerink (Czech Republic) D Vacek	w/o
(France) A Boetsch (France) O Delaître	7	6	6
WC	(France) H Leconte (Switzerland) M Rosset	6	7	4

Semifinals
1	(South Africa) D Adams (Russia) A Olhovskiy	7	3	6
(Czech Republic) M Damm (Russia) Y Kafelnikov	6	6	7
3	(Netherlands) J Siemerink (Czech Republic) D Vacek	6	6
(France) A Boetsch (France) O Delaître	2	3

Final
(Czech Republic) M Damm (Russia) Y Kafelnikov	7	4	1
3	(Netherlands) J Siemerink (Czech Republic) D Vacek	6	6	6
