= Régis Lavergne =

French tennis player

- Full name: Régis Lavergne
- Country (sports): France
- Born: 28 January 1974 (age 51)
- Prize money: $104,618

Singles
- Career record: 0–2
- Highest ranking: No. 194 (11 May 1998)

Doubles
- Career record: 0–2
- Highest ranking: No. 167 (2 August 1999)

Grand Slam doubles results
- French Open: 1R (1998)
- Wimbledon: 1R (1997)

Régis Lavergne (born 28 January 1974) is a former professional tennis player from France.

== Biography ==
Lavergne twice featured in the main draw on the ATP Tour, as a qualifier at back to back tournaments, the 1997 Grand Prix de Tennis de Toulouse and the Swiss Indoors in Basel. In both events he was beaten in the first round by countryman Fabrice Santoro.

He competed in the singles qualifying draws of all four grand slam tournaments and appeared as a lucky loser in the doubles at the 1997 Wimbledon Championships partnering Stephane Simian. His other grand slam appearance was as a wildcard pairing with veteran Guy Forget in the men's doubles at the 1998 French Open.

On the Challenger circuit he won two titles, both in doubles. At the 2002 Edinburgh Challenger he had a win over Andy Murray, 6–0, 6–1, in the qualifying draw. Murray, then aged 15, was attempting to qualify for his first Challenger event.

== Challenger titles ==
=== Doubles: (2) ===
No.	Year	Tournament	Surface	Partner	Opponents	Score
1.	1997	Tampere, Finland	Clay	(France) Cyril Buscaglione	(Finland) Tuomas Ketola (Slovenia) Borut Urh	6–4, 6–3
2.	1999	Contrexéville, France	Clay	(France) Jérôme Hanquez	(France) Rodolphe Gilbert (France) Stéphane Huet	6–4, 6–2
