= Gilles Bastié =

French tennis player

- Full name: Gilles Bastié
- Country (sports): France
- Born: 9 February 1971 (age 54)
- Prize money: $60,314

Singles
- Career record: 1–2
- Highest ranking: No. 318 (11 September 1995)

Doubles
- Career record: 6–11
- Highest ranking: No. 176 (4 November 1996)

Grand Slam doubles results
- French Open: 1R (1996)

Gilles Bastié (born 9 February 1971) is a former professional tennis player from France.

== Biography ==
Bastié competed on the professional tour in the 1990s.

Most of his ATP Tour main draw appearances came in the doubles format and he made two semi-finals. This included the Bordeaux Open of 1992, which he and Jordi Burillo opened with a win over Björn Borg, who was making a tour comeback, and his partner John Lloyd.

On the singles tour he qualified twice for the main draw at Bordeaux, in 1994 and 1995.

At the 1996 French Open he featured in the men's doubles draw as a wildcard pairing with countryman Lionel Barthez.

== Challenger titles ==
=== Doubles: (1) ===
No.	Year	Tournament	Surface	Partner	Opponents	Score
1.	1996	Montauban, France	Clay	(Ivory Coast) Claude N'Goran	(South Africa) Clinton Ferreira (Romania) Andrei Pavel	6–4, 1–6, 7–6
