= 1994 Grand Prix de Tennis de Toulouse – Doubles =

Doubles
- 1994 Grand Prix de Tennis de Toulouse

Final
- Champions: (Netherlands) Menno Oosting (Czech Republic) Daniel Vacek
- Runners-up: (United States) Patrick McEnroe (United States) Jared Palmer
- Score: 7–6, 6–7, 6–3
- Date: 16

Details
- Seeds: 4

Events
Singles	Doubles
- Grand Prix de Tennis de Toulouse

The 1994 Grand Prix de Tennis de Toulouse was a men's tennis tournament played on Indoor Hard in Toulouse, France that was part of the World Series of the 1994 ATP Tour. It was the thirteenth edition of the tournament and was held from 3 October until 9 October 1994.

== Seeds ==
Champion seeds are indicated in bold text while text in italics indicates the round in which those seeds were eliminated.

1. (Sweden) Jan Apell / (Sweden) Jonas Björkman (first round)
2. (United States) Patrick McEnroe / (United States) Jared Palmer (final)
3. (Netherlands) Tom Nijssen / (Czech Republic) Cyril Suk (first round, retired)
4. (United States) Scott Melville / (South Africa) Piet Norval (quarterfinals)

== Draw ==
Key

- Q = Qualifier
- WC = Wild card
- LL = Lucky loser
- Alt = Alternate
- ITF = ITF entry
- PR = Protected ranking
- SR = Special ranking
- SE = Special exempt
- JE = Junior exempt
- JR = Junior Accelerator Programme entrant
- CO = College Accelerator Programme entrant
- NG = Next Gen Accelerator Program entrant
- w/o = Walkover
- r = Retired
- d = Defaulted

=== Finals ===
First round
(Netherlands) **M Oosting** **(Czech Republic) D Vacek**	**6**	**6**
1	(Sweden) J Apell (Sweden) J Björkman	3	2
(France) **L Barthez** **(Zimbabwe) W Black**	**6**	**6**
(Mexico) J Lozano (United States) B Pearce	3	4
(France) **O Delaître** **(Switzerland) J Hlasek**	**6**	2
3	(Netherlands) T Nijssen (Czech Republic) C Suk	4	0	R
(United States) **D Randall** **(Czech Republic) D Rikl**	4	**6**	**7**
(Germany) M-K Goellner (Sweden) M Larsson	**6**	3	5
(Iran) **M Bahrami** **(France) F Santoro**	**6**	**6**
(South Africa) L Bale (South Africa) J-L de Jager	3	3
4	(United States) **S Melville** **(South Africa) P Norval**	4	**6**	**7**
(United States) M Bauer (South Africa) B Talbot	**6**	4	6
(France) **J-P Fleurian** **(France) R Gilbert**	5	**6**	**6**
(South Africa) G Muller (South Africa) D Visser	**7**	4	4
2	(United States) **P McEnroe** **(United States) J Palmer**	**7**	**6**
(Italy) D Nargiso (France) G Raoux	6	3

Quarterfinals
(Netherlands) **M Oosting** **(Czech Republic) D Vacek**	**7**	**6**
(France) L Barthez (Zimbabwe) W Black	6	2
'	(France) O Delaître (Switzerland) J Hlasek	4	4
(United States) **D Randall** **(Czech Republic) D Rikl**	**6**	**6**
(Iran) **M Bahrami** **(France) F Santoro**	**7**	**7**
4	(United States) S Melville (South Africa) P Norval	6	6
(France) J-P Fleurian (France) R Gilbert	3	0
2	(United States) **P McEnroe** **(United States) J Palmer**	**6**	**6**

Semifinals
(Netherlands) **M Oosting** **(Czech Republic) D Vacek**	**6**	**6**
(United States) D Randall (Czech Republic) D Rikl	3	2
(Iran) M Bahrami (France) F Santoro	1	3
2	(United States) **P McEnroe** **(United States) J Palmer**	**6**	**6**

Final
(Netherlands) **M Oosting** **(Czech Republic) D Vacek**	**7**	6	**6**
2	(United States) P McEnroe (United States) J Palmer	6	**7**	3
