= Pier Gauthier =

French tennis player and coach

- Country (sports): France
- Born: 20 April 1972 (age 53) Rennes, France
- Height: 6 ft 1 in (185 cm)
- Prize money: $101,628

Singles
- Career record: 1–5
- Highest ranking: No. 202 (19 June 1995)

Grand Slam singles results
- French Open: Q3 (1996)
- Wimbledon: Q2 (1997, 1998)
- US Open: Q3 (1996)

Doubles
- Career record: 0–4
- Highest ranking: No. 327 (11 September 1995)

Grand Slam doubles results
- French Open: 1R (1993)

Pier Gauthier (born 20 April 1972) is a French tennis coach and retired professional player. He is a former coach of Sébastien Grosjean and Gaël Monfils.

Born in Rennes, Gauthier turned professional in 1991 and reached a career best ranking of 202 in the world.

His best performance on the ATP Tour came at the 1992 Grand Prix de Tennis de Toulouse, where he won through to the second round.

Gauthier regularly competed in the singles qualifying draws for grand slam events, but made his only main draw appearance in doubles, as a local wildcard pairing with Guillaume Marx at the 1993 French Open.
