= Jérôme Hanquez =

French tennis player (1974–2020)

- Full name: Jérôme Hanquez
- Country (sports): France
- Born: 11 March 1974 Campagne-lès-Hesdin, France
- Died: 17 March 2020 (aged 46) Rueil-Malmaison, France
- Plays: Right-handed
- Prize money: $106,849

Singles
- Career record: 0–5
- Career titles: 0
- Highest ranking: No. 225 (9 September 1996)

Doubles
- Career record: 1–3
- Career titles: 0
- Highest ranking: No. 181 (1 November 1999)

Jérôme Hanquez (11 March 1974 – 17 March 2020) was a French professional tennis player.

== Biography ==
Hanquez was born in the Northern French town of Campagne-lès-Hesdin and started playing tennis at the age of nine. He had a win over Yevgeny Kafelnikov as a junior, when he made the round of 16 in the boys' singles at the 1992 French Open.

From 1994, he competed professionally and went on to appear in the main draw of five ATP Tour tournaments, including two at Lyon. He reached the final round of qualifying at the 1997 French Open but had to retire hurt during his match against Ramón Delgado.

As a doubles player he was an ATP Tour quarter-finalist once, at the 1999 Grand Prix de Tennis de Toulouse, with Nicolas Escudé. He and Régis Lavergne won the doubles title at the Contrexeville Challenger in 1999.

Hanquez died on 17 March 2020.

== Challenger titles ==
=== Doubles: (1) ===
No.	Year	Tournament	Surface	Partner	Opponents	Score
1.	1999	Contrexéville, France	Clay	(France) Régis Lavergne	(France) Rodolphe Gilbert (France) Stéphane Huet	6–4, 6–2
