= Stéphane Huet =

French tennis player (born 1971)

- Country (sports): France
- Born: 25 April 1971 (age 53); Paris, France
- Height: 1.80 m (5 ft 11 in)
- Turned pro: 1990
- Plays: Left-handed
- Prize money: $529,583

Singles
- Career record: 14–39
- Career titles: 0
- Highest ranking: No. 96 (10 July 2000)

Grand Slam singles results
- Australian Open: 2R (1999)
- French Open: 2R (1993, 1999)
- Wimbledon: 2R (2000, 2001)
- US Open: 1R (1999, 2000)

Doubles
- Career record: 2–5
- Career titles: 0
- Highest ranking: No. 292 (5 February 1996)

Grand Slam doubles results
- French Open: 2R (1994, 2000)

Stéphane Huet (French: [stefan ɥɛ]; born 25 April 1971) is a French tennis coach and a former professional player.

Huet appeared in a total of 16 Grand Slam tournaments during his career. When he made his Grand Slam tournament debut in the 1993 French Open, as a qualifier, he was ranked 297 in the world and had just one tour match to his name. Despite this, in the opening round he managed to defeat seventh-seed Ivan Lendl in four sets. It was the first time since 1978 that Lendl, a three-time French Open winner, had exited the tournament without registering a win. In 1999, Huet made the second round of two Majors, the Australian Open, where he beat Arnaud Di Pasquale, and the French Open, where he defeated Hendrik Dreekmann, before losing to Alberto Berasategui. At the 1999 US Open, Huet lost a final set tie-break in the first round to eventual finalist Todd Martin. The Frenchman reached the second round at Grand Slams on two further occasions, the 2000 Wimbledon Championships, when he defeated Mahesh Bhupathi, and at the same event a year later, when he had a victory against Markus Hipfl. He also played men's doubles twice and mixed doubles at four Major tournaments.

On the ATP Tour, he was a quarter-finalist at Toulouse in 1998 and also reached the quarter-finals stage at Palermo two years later. In the 2000 Tashkent Open he had a win over Carlos Moyá.

== Coaching career ==
As a coach his students included the French players Irena Pavlovic, Laetitia Sarrazin and Manon Arcangioli.

He was the coach of Arthur Cazaux until July 2024.

== Challenger titles ==
=== Singles: (2) ===
No.	Year	Tournament	Surface	Opponent	Score
1.	1999	Budapest, Hungary	Clay	(Austria) Werner Eschauer	6–3, 7–5
2.	1999	Hong Kong	Hard	(Japan) Gouichi Motomura	6–4, 4–6, 6–1
