= Lionel Barthez =

French tennis player

- Country (sports): France
- Residence: Toulouse
- Born: 18 May 1967 (age 57); Albi, France
- Height: 1.80 m (5 ft 11 in)
- Turned pro: 1988
- Plays: Right-handed
- Prize money: $196,324

Singles
- Career record: 4–11
- Career titles: 0
- Highest ranking: No. 154 (17 July 1995)

Grand Slam singles results
- French Open: 1R (1994, 1995)
- Wimbledon: 1R (1995)

Doubles
- Career record: 4–11
- Career titles: 0
- Highest ranking: No. 133 (2 October 1995)

Grand Slam doubles results
- French Open: 1R (1994, 1995, 1996)

Lionel Barthez (born 18 May 1967) is a former professional tennis player from France.

Barthez competed in four Grand Slams during his career. In the 1994 French Open he took the first two sets off world number 31 Ronald Agenor but lost in five. He and partner Stéphane Sansoni were unable to progress past the first round in the doubles. His next appearance was at the 1995 French Open, where he lost in the opening round to Norwegian player Christian Ruud and also failed to win a match in the men's doubles, partnering Thierry Guardiola. He also took part in the mixed doubles with Isabelle Demongeot and made the second round. In 1996 he played in his third successive French Open and once more lost his only singles match, to Gianluca Pozzi in four sets. He participated in the men's doubles with Gilles Bastié and the pair were unable to win their opening round fixture, although he did make the second round of the mixed doubles with Sandrine Testud.

The Frenchman was a quarter-finalist in the 1993 Grand Prix de Tennis de Lyon, his best showing on tour as a singles player. In the doubles however he reached a semi-final with Bastié in 1996, at the Marseille Open. He twice made doubles quarter-finals at the Grand Prix de Tennis de Toulouse, in 1994 with Wayne Black and 1997 partnering Clement N'Goran.

== Challenger titles ==
=== Doubles: (4) ===
| No. | Year | Tournament | Surface | Partner | Opponents | Score |
|---|---|---|---|---|---|---|
| 1. | 1994 | Malta | Clay | (Czech Republic) Radomír Vašek | (South Africa) Clinton Ferreira (South Africa) Ellis Ferreira | 6–2, 3–6, 6–2 |
| 2. | 1995 | Garmisch, Germany | Hard | (Portugal) Nuno Marques | (Germany) Mathias Huning (Belgium) Dick Norman | 7–6, 7–6 |
| 3. | 1995 | Malta | Hard | (South Africa) Marius Barnard | (Germany) Patrick Baur (Czech Republic) Tomas Anzari | 7–5, 6–3 |
| 4. | 1995 | Bristol, Great Britain | Grass | (France) Stéphane Simian | (Netherlands) Sander Groen (Germany) Arne Thoms | 7–5, 7–5 |
