= Grand Prix de Tennis de Toulouse =

Defunct tennis tournament
- Event name: Grand Prix de Tennis de Toulouse (1982 – 1999); Adidas Open de Toulouse (2000)
- Tour: Grand Prix (1982 – 1989); ATP Tour (1990 – 2000)
- Founded: 1982
- Abolished: 2000
- Editions: 19
- Location: Toulouse, France
- Surface: Carpet (1982 – 1993); Hard (1994 – 2000)

The Grand Prix de Tennis de Toulouse is a defunct Grand Prix and ATP Tour affiliated tennis tournament played from 1982 to 2000. It was held at the Palais des Sports de Toulouse in Toulouse in France and was played on indoor carpet courts from 1982 to 1993 and on indoor hard courts from 1994 to 2000. Roger Federer recorded the first match win of his career in Toulouse at the 1998 event.

== Finals ==
=== Singles ===
Year	Champions	Runners-up	Score
1982	(France) Yannick Noah	(Czechoslovakia) Tomáš Šmíd	6–3, 6–2
1983	(Switzerland) Heinz Günthardt	(Peru) Pablo Arraya	6–0, 6–2
1984	(United States) Mark Dickson	(Switzerland) Heinz Günthardt	7–6, 6–4
1985	(France) Yannick Noah	(Czechoslovakia) Tomáš Šmíd	6–4, 6–4
1986	(France) Guy Forget	(Sweden) Jan Gunnarsson	4–6, 6–3, 6–2
1987	(United States) Tim Mayotte	(West Germany) Ricki Osterthun	6–2, 5–7, 6–4
1988	(United States) Jimmy Connors	(Soviet Union) Andrei Chesnokov	6–2, 6–0
1989	(United States) Jimmy Connors	(United States) John McEnroe	6–3, 6–3
1990	(Sweden) Jonas Svensson	(France) Fabrice Santoro	7–6, 6–2
1991	(France) Guy Forget	(Israel) Amos Mansdorf	6–2, 7–6
1992	(France) Guy Forget	(Czechoslovakia) Petr Korda	6–3, 6–2
1993	(France) Arnaud Boetsch	(France) Cédric Pioline	7–6, 3–6, 6–3
1994	(Sweden) Magnus Larsson	(United States) Jared Palmer	6–1, 6–3
1995	(France) Arnaud Boetsch	(United States) Jim Courier	6–4, 6–7, 6–0
1996	(Australia) Mark Philippoussis	(Sweden) Magnus Larsson	6–1, 5–7, 6–4
1997	(Germany) Nicolas Kiefer	(Australia) Mark Philippoussis	7–5, 5–7, 6–4
1998	(Netherlands) Jan Siemerink	(United Kingdom) Greg Rusedski	6–4, 6–4
1999	(France) Nicolas Escudé	(Czech Republic) Daniel Vacek	7–5, 6–1
2000	(Spain) Àlex Corretja	(Spain) Carlos Moyá	6–3, 6–2

=== Doubles ===
Year	Champions	Runners-up	Score
1982	(Czechoslovakia) Pavel Složil (Czechoslovakia) Tomáš Šmíd	(France) Jean-Louis Haillet (France) Yannick Noah	6–4, 6–4
1983	(Switzerland) Heinz Günthardt (Czechoslovakia) Pavel Složil	(South Africa) Bernard Mitton (United States) Butch Walts	5–7, 7–5, 6–4
1984	(Sweden) Jan Gunnarsson (Denmark) Michael Mortensen	(Czechoslovakia) Pavel Složil (United States) Tim Wilkison	6–4, 6–2
1985	(Chile) Ricardo Acuña (Switzerland) Jakob Hlasek	(Czechoslovakia) Pavel Složil (Czechoslovakia) Tomáš Šmíd	3–6, 6–2, 9–7
1986	(Czechoslovakia) Miloslav Mečíř (Czechoslovakia) Tomáš Šmíd	(Switzerland) Jakob Hlasek (Czechoslovakia) Pavel Složil	6–2, 3–6, 6–4
1987	(Poland) Wojtek Fibak (Netherlands) Michiel Schapers	(United States) Kelly Jones (West Germany) Patrik Kühnen	6–2, 6–4
1988	(Netherlands) Tom Nijssen (West Germany) Ricki Osterthun	(Iran) Mansour Bahrami (France) Guy Forget	6–3, 6–4
1989	(Iran) Mansour Bahrami (France) Éric Winogradsky	(United States) Todd Nelson (The Bahamas) Roger Smith	6–2, 7–6
1990	(United Kingdom) Neil Broad (South Africa) Gary Muller	(Denmark) Michael Mortensen (Netherlands) Michiel Schapers	7–6, 6–4
1991	(Netherlands) Tom Nijssen (Czechoslovakia) Cyril Suk	(United Kingdom) Jeremy Bates (United States) Kevin Curren	4–6, 6–3, 7–6
1992	(United States) Brad Pearce (South Africa) Byron Talbot	(France) Guy Forget (France) Henri Leconte	6–1, 3–6, 6–3
1993	(Zimbabwe) Byron Black (United States) Jonathan Stark	(Germany) David Prinosil (Germany) Udo Riglewski	7–5, 7–6
1994	(Netherlands) Menno Oosting (Czech Republic) Daniel Vacek	(United States) Patrick McEnroe (United States) Jared Palmer	7–6, 6–7, 6–3
1995	(Sweden) Jonas Björkman (South Africa) John-Laffnie de Jager	(United States) Dave Randall (United States) Greg Van Emburgh	7–6, 7–6
1996	(Netherlands) Jacco Eltingh (Netherlands) Paul Haarhuis	(France) Olivier Delaître (France) Guillaume Raoux	6–3, 7–5
1997	(Netherlands) Jacco Eltingh (Netherlands) Paul Haarhuis	(France) Jean-Philippe Fleurian (Belarus) Max Mirnyi	6–3, 7–6
1998	(France) Olivier Delaître (France) Fabrice Santoro	(Netherlands) Paul Haarhuis (Netherlands) Jan Siemerink	6–2, 6–4
1999	(France) Olivier Delaître (United States) Jeff Tarango	(South Africa) David Adams (South Africa) John-Laffnie de Jager	3–6, 7–6, 6–4
2000	(France) Julien Boutter (France) Fabrice Santoro	(United States) Donald Johnson (South Africa) Piet Norval	7–6^{(10–8)}, 4–6, 7–6^{(7–5)}
