= Jan Siemerink =

Dutch tennis player

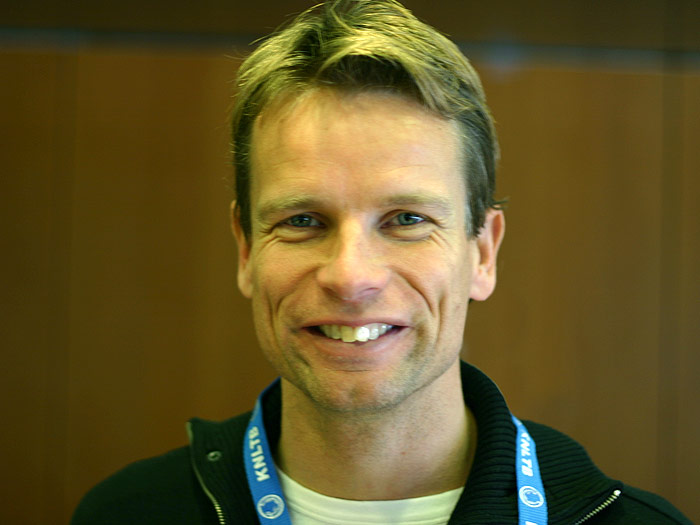
- Country (sports): Netherlands
- Residence: Monte Carlo, Monaco
- Born: 14 April 1970 (age 56) Rijnsburg, Netherlands
- Height: 1.83 m (6 ft 0 in)
- Turned pro: 1989
- Retired: 2002
- Plays: Left-handed (one-handed backhand)
- Prize money: $4,347,693

Singles
- Career record: 273–272 (ATP, Grand Prix and Grand Slam level, and Davis Cup)
- Career titles: 4
- Highest ranking: No. 14 (12 October 1998)

Grand Slam singles results
- Australian Open: 4R (1991)
- French Open: 3R (1997)
- Wimbledon: QF (1998)
- US Open: 4R (1998)

Other tournaments
- Olympic Games: 1R (1992, 1996)

Doubles
- Career record: 203–185 (ATP, Grand Prix and Grand Slam level, and Davis Cup)
- Career titles: 10
- Highest ranking: No. 16 (14 October 1996)

Grand Slam doubles results
- Australian Open: SF (1992)
- French Open: 3R (1995, 1997, 1999)
- Wimbledon: SF (1996)
- US Open: 2R (1991, 1996)

Grand Slam mixed doubles results
- French Open: 2R (2000)
- Wimbledon: 3R (1991)

Johannes Martinus "Jan" Siemerink (Dutch pronunciation: [jɑn ˈsimərɪŋk]; born 14 April 1970) is a retired tennis player from the Netherlands. The former Dutch Davis Cup captain reached a career-high ATP ranking of 14.

== Career ==
=== Tennis ===
As a junior player, Siemerink was the Dutch 18-under champion in 1988. He also won the doubles title at the 1988 Orange Bowl junior championship in Florida.

Siemerink turned professional in 1989. Over the course of his career, he won four top-level singles titles (at Singapore in 1991, Nottingham in 1996, and at Rotterdam and Toulouse in 1998). He also won ten tour doubles titles, the most significant of which were the Miami Masters in 1993 and the Monte-Carlo Masters in 1996.

Siemerink's best performance at a Grand Slam event came at Wimbledon in 1998, where he reached the quarterfinals by defeating Ctislav Doseděl, David Prinosil, Jonas Björkman and Magnus Larsson, before being knocked-out by Goran Ivanišević in three tie-breaks. Siemerink is also known for winning a fourth set tie-break against compatriot Richard Krajicek from 6–0 down in the 1994 US Open, though Krajicek eventually won the match.

Siemerink played for the Netherlands in the Davis Cup between 1991 and 2001, compiling a 17–10 record. He helped the Netherlands reach the World Group semi-finals in 2001.

Siemerink's career-high rankings were world No. 14 in singles (in 1998) and world No. 16 in doubles (in 1996). His career prize-money totaled $4,347,693.

After his playing career Siemerink was captain of the Dutch Davis Cup team from 2006 until 2016.

=== Other ===
In February 2018, Siemerink became team manager of the football club Ajax.

== ATP career finals ==
=== Singles: 12 (4 titles, 8 runner-ups) ===
| Legend Grand Slam Tournaments (0–0) ATP World Tour Finals (0–0) ATP Masters 1000 Series (0–0) ATP 500 Series (0–2) ATP 250 Series (4–6) | Finals by surface Hard (2–4) Clay (0–1) Grass (1–0) Carpet (1–3) | Finals by setting Outdoors (2–3) Indoors (2–5) |

| Result | W–L | Date | Tournament | Tier | Surface | Opponent | Score |
|---|---|---|---|---|---|---|---|
| Win | 1–0 | Apr 1991 | Singapore, Singapore | World Series | Hard | (Israel) Gilad Bloom | 6–4, 6–3 |
| Loss | 1–1 | Oct 1991 | Vienna, Austria | World Series | Carpet | (Germany) Michael Stich | 4–6, 4–6, 4–6 |
| Loss | 1–2 | Feb 1993 | Marseille, France | World Series | Carpet | (Switzerland) Marc Rosset | 2–6, 6–7^{(1–7)} |
| Loss | 1–3 | Jul 1995 | Amsterdam, Netherlands | World Series | Clay | (Chile) Marcelo Ríos | 4–6, 5–7, 4–6 |
| Loss | 1–4 | Aug 1995 | Long Island, United States | International Series | Hard | (Russia) Yevgeny Kafelnikov | 6–7^{(0–7)}, 2–6 |
| Loss | 1–5 | Oct 1995 | Basel, Switzerland | World Series | Hard (i) | (United States) Jim Courier | 7–6^{(7–2)}, 6–7^{(5–7)}, 7–5, 2–6, 5–7 |
| Win | 2–5 | Jun 1996 | Nottingham, United Kingdom | World Series | Grass | (Australia) Sandon Stolle | 6–3, 7–6^{(7–0)} |
| Loss | 2–6 | Aug 1996 | New Haven, United States | Championship Series | Hard | (United States) Alex O'Brien | 6–7^{(6–8)}, 4–6 |
| Loss | 2–7 | Oct 1996 | Vienna, Austria | Championship Series | Carpet | (Germany) Boris Becker | 4–6, 7–6^{(9–7)}, 2–6, 3–6 |
| Loss | 2–8 | Nov 1997 | Stockholm, Sweden | International Series | Hard (i) | (Sweden) Jonas Björkman | 6–3, 6–7^{(2–7)}, 2–6, 4–6 |
| Win | 3–8 | Mar 1998 | Rotterdam, Netherlands | World Series | Carpet | (Sweden) Thomas Johansson | 7–6^{(7–2)}, 6–2 |
| Win | 4–8 | Sep 1998 | Toulouse, France | World Series | Hard (i) | (United Kingdom) Greg Rusedski | 6–4, 6–4 |

=== Doubles: 18 (10 titles, 7 runner-ups) ===
| Legend Grand Slam Tournaments (0–0) ATP World Tour Finals (0–0) ATP Masters 1000 Series (2–0) ATP 500 Series (0–1) ATP 250 Series (8–6) | Finals by surface Hard (2–3) Clay (4–1) Grass (2–1) Carpet (2–2) | Finals by setting Outdoors (8–4) Indoors (2–3) |

| Result | W–L | Date | Tournament | Tier | Surface | Partner | Opponents | Score |
|---|---|---|---|---|---|---|---|---|
| Loss | 0–1 | Jun 1991 | Rosmalen, Netherlands | World Series | Grass | (Netherlands) Richard Krajicek | (Netherlands) Hendrik Jan Davids (Netherlands) Paul Haarhuis | 3–6, 6–7 |
| Win | 1–1 | Jul 1991 | Hilversum, Netherlands | World Series | Clay | (Netherlands) Richard Krajicek | (Spain) Francisco Clavet (Sweden) Magnus Gustafsson | 7–5, 6–4 |
| Loss | 1–2 | Oct 1991 | Berlin, Germany | World Series | Carpet | (Czech Republic) Daniel Vacek | (Czech Republic) Petr Korda (Czech Republic) Karel Nováček | 6–3, 5–7, 5–7 |
| Win | 2–2 | Mar 1993 | Miami, United States | Masters Series | Hard | (Netherlands) Richard Krajicek | (United States) Patrick McEnroe (United States) Jonathan Stark | 6–7, 6–4, 7–6 |
| Win | 3–2 | Feb 1994 | Marseille, France | World Series | Carpet | (Czech Republic) Daniel Vacek | (Czech Republic) Martin Damm (Russia) Yevgeny Kafelnikov | 6–7, 6–4, 6–1 |
| Win | 4–2 | Jul 1994 | Hilversum, Netherlands | World Series | Clay | (Argentina) Daniel Orsanic | (South Africa) David Adams (Russia) Andrei Olhovskiy | 6–4, 6–2 |
| Loss | 4–3 | Jan 1995 | Doha, Qatar | World Series | Hard | (Russia) Andrei Olhovskiy | (Sweden) Stefan Edberg (Sweden) Magnus Larsson | 6–7, 2–6 |
| Win | 5–3 | Jun 1995 | Rosmalen, Netherlands | World Series | Grass | (Netherlands) Richard Krajicek | (Netherlands) Hendrik Jan Davids (Russia) Andrei Olhovskiy | 7–5, 6–3 |
| Loss | 5–4 | Jul 1995 | Stuttgart, Germany | Championship Series | Clay | (South Africa) Ellis Ferreira | (Spain) Tomás Carbonell (Spain) Francisco Roig | 6–3, 3–6, 3–6 |
| Win | 6–4 | Oct 1995 | Vienna, Austria | World Series | Carpet | (South Africa) Ellis Ferreira | (Australia) Todd Woodbridge (Australia) Mark Woodforde | 6–4, 7–5 |
| Win | 7–4 | Jan 1996 | Sydney, Australia | World Series | Hard | (South Africa) Ellis Ferreira | (United States) Patrick McEnroe (Australia) Sandon Stolle | 5–7, 6–4, 6–1 |
| Win | 8–4 | Apr 1996 | Monte Carlo, Monaco | Masters Series | Clay | (South Africa) Ellis Ferreira | (Sweden) Jonas Björkman (Sweden) Nicklas Kulti | 2–6, 6–3, 6–2 |
| Loss | 8–5 | Jan 1997 | Sydney, Australia | World Series | Hard | (Netherlands) Paul Haarhuis | (Argentina) Luis Lobo (Spain) Javier Sánchez | 4–6, 7–6, 3–6 |
| Loss | 8–6 | Mar 1998 | Copenhagen, Denmark | International Series | Carpet | (New Zealand) Brett Steven | (Netherlands) Tom Kempers (Netherlands) Menno Oosting | 4–6, 6–7 |
| Win | 9–6 | Jun 1998 | 's-Hertogenbosch, Netherlands | International Series | Grass | (France) Guillaume Raoux | (Australia) Joshua Eagle (Australia) Andrew Florent | 7–6, 6–2 |
| Loss | 9–7 | Oct 1998 | Toulouse, France | World Series | Hard | (Netherlands) Paul Haarhuis | (France) Olivier Delaître (France) Fabrice Santoro | 2–6, 4–6 |
| Cancelled | 9–7 | Jun 1999 | 's-Hertogenbosch, Netherlands | International Series | Grass | (India) Leander Paes | (South Africa) Ellis Ferreira (Czech Republic) David Rikl | cancelled (rain) |
| Win | 10–7 | May 2000 | Orlando, United States | International Series | Clay | (India) Leander Paes | (United States) Justin Gimelstob (Canada) Sébastien Lareau | 6–3, 6–4 |

== ATP Challenger and ITF Futures finals ==
=== Singles: 5 (3–2) ===
| Legend ATP Challenger (3–2) ITF Futures (0–0) | Finals by surface Hard (0–2) Clay (0–0) Grass (0–0) Carpet (3–0) |

| Result | W–L | Date | Tournament | Tier | Surface | Opponent | Score |
|---|---|---|---|---|---|---|---|
| Win | 1–0 | Feb 1991 | Telford, United Kingdom | Challenger | Carpet | (Canada) Martin Laurendeau | 6–3, 6–4 |
| Win | 2–0 | Nov 1994 | Aachen, Germany | Challenger | Carpet | (Germany) David Prinosil | 5–7, 7–6, 6–4 |
| Loss | 2–1 | Aug 2000 | Segovia, Spain | Challenger | Hard | (Spain) Sergi Bruguera | 7–5, 3–6, 0–1 ret. |
| Loss | 2–2 | Oct 2000 | Grenoble, France | Challenger | Hard | (France) Antony Dupuis | 6–7^{(10–12)}, 6–7^{(11–13)} |
| Win | 3–2 | Nov 2000 | Charleroi, Belgium | Challenger | Carpet | (Thailand) Paradorn Srichaphan | 7–6^{(7–2)}, 7–6^{(10–8)} |

=== Doubles: 7 (6–1) ===
| Legend ATP Challenger (6–1) ITF Futures (0–0) | Finals by surface Hard (1–0) Clay (2–0) Grass (0–0) Carpet (3–1) |

| Result | W–L | Date | Tournament | Tier | Surface | Partner | Opponents | Score |
|---|---|---|---|---|---|---|---|---|
| Win | 1–0 | Jul 1990 | Tampere, Finland | Challenger | Clay | (Netherlands) Mark Koevermans | (Italy) Massimo Cierro (Sweden) Tobias Svantesson | 6–1, 6–2 |
| Win | 2–0 | Nov 1990 | The Hague, Netherlands | Challenger | Carpet | (Netherlands) Mark Koevermans | (Germany) Alexander Mronz (Russia) Andrei Olhovskiy | 6–3, 7–5 |
| Loss | 2–1 | Feb 1991 | Telford, United Kingdom | Challenger | Carpet | (Sweden) Peter Nyborg | (Canada) Martin Laurendeau (Mexico) Leonardo Lavalle | 6–7, 3–6 |
| Win | 3–1 | Nov 1997 | Réunion Island, Réunion | Challenger | Hard | (South Africa) Clinton Ferreira | (Spain) Álex Calatrava (France) Jérôme Golmard | 6–2, 6–3 |
| Win | 4–1 | Jan 2000 | Heilbronn, Germany | Challenger | Carpet | (Netherlands) John Van Lottum | (Sweden) Magnus Larsson (Sweden) Fredrik Lovén | 7–5, 7–6^{(8–6)} |
| Win | 5–1 | Apr 2000 | Paget, Bermuda | Challenger | Clay | (India) Leander Paes | (South Africa) Jeff Coetzee (South Africa) Brent Haygarth | 6–3, 6–2 |
| Win | 6–1 | Nov 2000 | Aachen, Germany | Challenger | Carpet | (Netherlands) Sander Groen | (Germany) Michael Kohlmann (Germany) Franz Stauder | 6–7^{(2–7)}, 7–6^{(9–7)}, 6–3 |

== Performance timelines ==
Key
| W | F | SF | QF | #R | RR | Q# | DNQ | A | NH |

(W) winner; (F) finalist; (SF) semifinalist; (QF) quarterfinalist; (#R) rounds 4, 3, 2, 1; (RR) round-robin stage; (Q#) qualification round; (DNQ) did not qualify; (A) absent; (NH) not held; (SR) strike rate (events won / competed); (W–L) win–loss record.

=== Singles ===
| Tournament | 1990 | 1991 | 1992 | 1993 | 1994 | 1995 | 1996 | 1997 | 1998 | 1999 | 2000 | 2001 | 2002 | SR | W–L | Win % |
|---|---|---|---|---|---|---|---|---|---|---|---|---|---|---|---|---|
Grand Slam tournaments
| Australian Open | A | 4R | 2R | 3R | 2R | 2R | 3R | 1R | 2R | 1R | 1R | 2R | A | 0 / 11 | 12–11 | 52% |
| French Open | A | 1R | 1R | 1R | A | 1R | 2R | 3R | 1R | 1R | Q1 | 1R | Q3 | 0 / 9 | 3–9 | 25% |
| Wimbledon | Q1 | 1R | 1R | 1R | A | 3R | 1R | 1R | QF | 1R | 1R | 1R | A | 0 / 10 | 6–10 | 38% |
| US Open | A | 3R | 3R | 2R | 1R | 1R | 3R | 1R | 4R | 1R | 1R | 2R | Q1 | 0 / 11 | 11–11 | 50% |
| Win–loss | 0–0 | 5–4 | 3–4 | 3–4 | 1–2 | 3–4 | 5–4 | 2–4 | 8–4 | 0–4 | 0–3 | 2–4 | 0–0 | 0 / 41 | 32–41 | 44% |
National Representation
| Summer Olympic Games | NH | | 1R | Not Held | | | 1R | Not Held | | | A | NH | | 0 / 2 | 0–2 | 0% |
ATP Masters Series
| Indian Wells | A | A | A | A | A | A | A | A | A | 3R | A | A | A | 0 / 1 | 2–1 | 67% |
| Miami | A | 3R | 1R | 1R | 4R | 4R | 2R | 2R | 3R | 3R | Q2 | 2R | A | 0 / 10 | 11–10 | 52% |
| Monte Carlo | A | A | 1R | 1R | A | 2R | 2R | 2R | 1R | 1R | Q1 | Q1 | A | 0 / 7 | 3–7 | 30% |
| Hamburg | A | A | 1R | A | A | 2R | 1R | 1R | 1R | A | A | A | A | 0 / 5 | 1–5 | 17% |
| Rome | A | 1R | 1R | 3R | 2R | 2R | 1R | 2R | 1R | 2R | A | A | A | 0 / 9 | 6–9 | 40% |
| Canada | A | A | A | A | A | A | A | 2R | 1R | 2R | A | A | A | 0 / 3 | 2–3 | 40% |
| Cincinnati | A | A | 1R | 3R | Q1 | 3R | 1R | QF | 3R | 2R | A | A | A | 0 / 7 | 10–7 | 59% |
| Paris | A | 1R | Q2 | A | A | 3R | 1R | 2R | 2R | A | A | A | A | 0 / 5 | 2–5 | 29% |
| Win–loss | 0–0 | 2–3 | 0–5 | 4–4 | 4–2 | 9–6 | 1–6 | 7–7 | 3–7 | 6–6 | 0–0 | 1–1 | 0–0 | 0 / 47 | 37–47 | 44% |

=== Doubles ===
| Tournament | 1990 | 1991 | 1992 | 1993 | 1994 | 1995 | 1996 | 1997 | 1998 | 1999 | 2000 | 2001 | SR | W–L | Win % |
|---|---|---|---|---|---|---|---|---|---|---|---|---|---|---|---|
Grand Slam tournaments
| Australian Open | A | 1R | SF | 3R | 2R | 1R | 1R | 1R | 1R | 2R | 2R | 1R | 0 / 11 | 9–11 | 45% |
| French Open | A | 2R | 1R | 1R | A | 3R | 1R | 3R | 1R | 3R | 1R | 1R | 0 / 10 | 7–10 | 41% |
| Wimbledon | 1R | 1R | 1R | 1R | A | QF | SF | 1R | 2R | A | 2R | 2R | 0 / 10 | 10–10 | 50% |
| US Open | A | 2R | 1R | 1R | 1R | 1R | 2R | 1R | 1R | 1R | 1R | 1R | 0 / 11 | 2–11 | 15% |
| Win–loss | 0–1 | 2–4 | 4–4 | 2–4 | 1–2 | 5–4 | 5–4 | 2–4 | 1–4 | 3–3 | 2–4 | 1–4 | 0 / 42 | 28–42 | 40% |
ATP Masters Series
| Indian Wells | A | A | A | A | A | A | A | A | A | Q1 | A | A | 0 / 0 | 0–0 | – |
| Miami | A | A | 3R | W | SF | 3R | 3R | 1R | A | 1R | A | Q1 | 1 / 7 | 15–6 | 71% |
| Monte Carlo | A | A | 2R | QF | A | 2R | W | 1R | A | A | A | Q2 | 1 / 5 | 8–4 | 67% |
| Hamburg | A | A | 1R | A | A | 2R | 1R | 1R | A | A | A | A | 0 / 4 | 1–4 | 20% |
| Rome | A | 2R | A | 1R | 2R | SF | SF | 1R | A | Q1 | A | A | 0 / 6 | 8–6 | 57% |
| Canada | A | A | A | A | A | A | A | 1R | 2R | 1R | A | A | 0 / 3 | 1–3 | 25% |
| Cincinnati | A | A | Q1 | QF | 1R | QF | SF | 2R | 1R | A | A | A | 0 / 6 | 8–6 | 57% |
| Paris | A | 1R | A | A | A | 1R | 2R | Q2 | A | A | A | A | 0 / 3 | 0–3 | 0% |
| Win–loss | 0–0 | 1–2 | 3–3 | 10–3 | 4–3 | 9–6 | 12–5 | 1–6 | 1–2 | 0–2 | 0–0 | 0–0 | 2 / 34 | 41–32 | 56% |
