= 1989 Tel Aviv Open – Doubles =

Doubles
- 1989 Tel Aviv Open

Final
- Champions: (United Kingdom) Jeremy Bates (West Germany) Patrick Baur
- Runners-up: (Sweden) Rikard Bergh (Sweden) Per Henricsson
- Score: 6–1, 4–6, 6–1

Events
Singles	Doubles
← 1988 ·	Tel Aviv Open	· 1990 →

Roger Smith and Paul Wekesa were the defending champions, but did not participate this year.

Jeremy Bates and Patrick Baur won the title, defeating Rikard Bergh and Per Henricsson 6–1, 4–6, 6–1 in the final.

== Seeds ==
1. (United States) Matt Anger / (United States) Tim Pawsat (first round)
2. (Netherlands) Paul Haarhuis / (Netherlands) Menno Oosting (semifinals)
3. (United Kingdom) Jeremy Bates / (West Germany) Patrick Baur (champions)
4. (Sweden) Rikard Bergh / (Sweden) Per Henricsson (final)

== Draw ==
=== Key ===
- Q = Qualifier
- WC = Wild card
- LL = Lucky loser
- Alt = Alternate
- SE = Special exempt
- PR = Protected ranking
- ITF = ITF entry
- JE = Junior exempt
- w/o = Walkover
- r = Retired
- d = Defaulted
- SR = Special ranking

=== Draw ===
First round
1	(United States) M Anger (United States) T Pawsat	6	6	6
(New Zealand) S Guy (West Germany) A Mronz	7	0	7
(Australia) R Barlow (Sweden) D Engel	6	1
(Sweden) J Carlsson (Sweden) T Nydahl	7	6
4	(Sweden) R Bergh (Sweden) P Henricsson	6	3	6
(Israel) A Mansdorf (Romania) I Năstase	2	6	1
(Mexico) Stefan Dallwitz (Spain) MA Gorriz	4	6
(South Africa) L Bale (United States) M Ozer	6	7
(Israel) G Bloom (Nigeria) N Odizor	4	3
(United Kingdom) N Brown (United Kingdom) N Fulwood	6	6
(Brazil) D Marcelino (Belgium) E Masso	1	6
3	(United Kingdom) J Bates (West Germany) P Baur	6	7
(Israel) S Perkiss (Israel) R Weidenfeld	7	4	6
(Italy) G Pozzi (West Germany) M Zoecke	6	6	3
(United States) K Kinnear (Puerto Rico) M Nido	7	6	5
2	(Netherlands) P Haarhuis (Netherlands) M Oosting	6	7	7

Quarterfinals
(New Zealand) S Guy (West Germany) A Mronz	6	6
(Sweden) J Carlsson (Sweden) T Nydahl	2	3
4	(Sweden) R Bergh (Sweden) P Henricsson	3	7	6
(South Africa) L Bale (United States) M Ozer	6	6	3
(United Kingdom) N Brown (United Kingdom) N Fulwood	4	6
3	(United Kingdom) J Bates (West Germany) P Baur	6	7
(Israel) S Perkiss (Israel) R Weidenfeld	2	1
2	(Netherlands) P Haarhuis (Netherlands) M Oosting	6	6

Semifinals
(New Zealand) S Guy (West Germany) A Mronz	3	3
4	(Sweden) R Bergh (Sweden) P Henricsson	6	6
3	(United Kingdom) J Bates (West Germany) P Baur	6	6
2	(Netherlands) P Haarhuis (Netherlands) M Oosting	4	2

Final
4	(Sweden) R Bergh (Sweden) P Henricsson	1	6	1
3	(United Kingdom) J Bates (West Germany) P Baur	6	4	6
