= 1988 Tel Aviv Open – Singles =

Singles
- 1988 Tel Aviv Open

Final
- Champion: (United States) Brad Gilbert
- Runner-up: (United States) Aaron Krickstein
- Score: 4–6, 7–6, 6–2

Events
Singles	Doubles
← 1987 ·	Tel Aviv Open	· 1989 →

Amos Mansdorf was the defending champion, but lost in the semifinals this year.

Brad Gilbert won the tournament, beating Aaron Krickstein in the final, 4–6, 7–6, 6–2.

== Seeds ==
1. (United States) Brad Gilbert (champion)
2. (United States) Aaron Krickstein (final)
3. (Israel) Amos Mansdorf (semifinals)
4. (South Africa) Christo van Rensburg (semifinals)
5. (South Africa) Pieter Aldrich (first round)
6. (Canada) Martin Laurendeau (first round)
7. (Sweden) Christer Allgårdh (first round)
8. (Brazil) Danilo Marcelino (second round)

== Draw ==
=== Key ===
- Q = Qualifier
- WC = Wild card
- LL = Lucky loser
- Alt = Alternate
- SE = Special exempt
- PR = Protected ranking
- ITF = ITF entry
- JE = Junior exempt
- w/o = Walkover
- r = Retired
- d = Defaulted
- SR = Special ranking

=== Finals ===
Semifinals
1	(United States) Brad Gilbert	6	6
3	(Israel) Amos Mansdorf	3	4
4	(South Africa) Christo van Rensburg	6	5
2	(United States) Aaron Krickstein	7	7

Final
1	(United States) Brad Gilbert	4	7	6
2	(United States) Aaron Krickstein	6	6	2

=== Top half ===
First round
1	(United States) B Gilbert	6	6
Q	(Israel) M Daniel	2	3
Q	(Sweden) D Engel	3	6	5
(Brazil) M Menezes	6	1	7
(Sweden) T Haldin	4	7	1
(South Africa) B Talbot	6	5	6
(United States) S Davis	6	6
7	(Sweden) C Allgårdh	3	1
3	(Israel) A Mansdorf	6	6
WC	(Israel) A Naor	4	2
(Belgium) L Pimek	6	4	6
Q	(Israel) O Motevassel	4	6	2
(New Zealand) S Guy	6	6
(United States) L Jensen	3	3
(West Germany) A Mronz	7	6
6	(Canada) M Laurendeau	6	2

Second round
1	(United States) B Gilbert	6	6
(Brazil) M Menezes	3	1
(South Africa) B Talbot	6	4	4
(United States) S Davis	3	6	6
3	(Israel) A Mansdorf	4	6	7
(Belgium) L Pimek	6	2	5
(New Zealand) S Guy	4	4
(West Germany) A Mronz	6	6

Quarterfinals
1	(United States) B Gilbert	6	6
(United States) S Davis	4	3
3	(Israel) A Mansdorf	6	6
(West Germany) A Mronz	1	4

Semifinals
1	(United States) B Gilbert	6	6
3	(Israel) A Mansdorf	3	4

=== Bottom half ===
First round
5	(South Africa) P Aldrich	7	5	3
Q	(Israel) S Perkiss	6	7	6
(The Bahamas) R Smith	3	6	6
WC	(Israel) B Merenstein	6	0	2
(West Germany) M Westphal	6	2
(Austria) A Antonitsch	7	6
WC	(Israel) R Weidenfeld	3	1
4	(South Africa) C van Rensburg	6	6
8	(Brazil) D Marcelino	7	6
(Sweden) R Båthman	6	4
(West Germany) P Baur	6	6
(New Zealand) D Lewis	4	0
(Israel) G Bloom	7	6
(West Germany) D Keretić	6	1
(Kenya) P Wekesa	5	6	4
2	(United States) A Krickstein	7	2	6

Second round
Q	(Israel) S Perkiss	6	6	6
(The Bahamas) R Smith	7	4	2
(Austria) A Antonitsch	2	7	0
4	(South Africa) C van Rensburg	6	6	6
8	(Brazil) D Marcelino	2	4
(West Germany) P Baur	6	6
(Israel) G Bloom	7	5	5
2	(United States) A Krickstein	5	7	7

Quarterfinals
Q	(Israel) S Perkiss	3	6	4
4	(South Africa) C van Rensburg	6	3	6
(West Germany) P Baur	4	2
2	(United States) A Krickstein	6	6

Semifinals
4	(South Africa) C van Rensburg	6	5
2	(United States) A Krickstein	7	7
