= 1990 Riklis Classic – Doubles =

Doubles
- 1990 Riklis Classic

Final
- Champions: (Nigeria) Nduka Odizor (South Africa) Christo van Rensburg
- Runners-up: (Sweden) Ronnie Båthman (Sweden) Rikard Bergh
- Score: 6–3, 6–4

Details
- Draw: 16
- Seeds: 4

Events
Singles	Doubles
← 1989 ·	Riklis Classic	· 1991 →

Jeremy Bates and Patrick Baur were the defending champions, but did not participate this year.

Nduka Odizor and Christo van Rensburg won the title, defeating Ronnie Båthman and Rikard Bergh 6–3, 6–4 in the final.

== Seeds ==
1. (Nigeria) Nduka Odizor / (South Africa) Christo van Rensburg (champions)
2. (Spain) Tomás Carbonell / (Spain) Marcos Aurelio Gorriz (semifinals)
3. (South Africa) Wayne Ferreira / (South Africa) Piet Norval (quarterfinals)
4. (Sweden) Ronnie Båthman / (Sweden) Rikard Bergh (final)

== Draw ==
=== Key ===
- Q = Qualifier
- WC = Wild card
- LL = Lucky loser
- Alt = Alternate
- ITF = ITF entry
- PR = Protected ranking
- SR = Special ranking
- SE = Special exempt
- JE = Junior exempt
- JR = Junior Accelerator Programme entrant
- CO = College Accelerator Programme entrant
- NG = Next Gen Accelerator Program entrant
- w/o = Walkover
- r = Retired
- d = Defaulted

=== Draw ===
First round
1	(Nigeria) N Odizor (South Africa) C van Rensburg	6	6
(Israel) S Glickstein (Israel) A Naor	1	2
Q	(Israel) O Sela (Israel) Yuval Hirsch	5	3
(Israel) S Perkiss (Israel) R Weidenfeld	7	6
3	(South Africa) W Ferreira (South Africa) P Norval	6	6
(Israel) O Motevassel (Israel) Haim Zion	0	1
(Israel) G Bloom (United States) A Hombrecher	7	7
(Venezuela) N Pereira (Italy) G Pozzi	5	5
WC	(Israel) Gil Kovalski (Israel) E Ran	3	3
(Netherlands) M Koevermans (Netherlands) J Siemerink	6	6
(Sweden) L Jonsson (Germany) P Vojtischek	4	2
4	(Sweden) R Båthman (Sweden) R Bergh	6	6
(Israel) M Daniel (South Africa) M Robertson	6	4	2
(Sweden) D Engel (United States) J Tarango	3	6	6
(Israel) B Merenstein (Israel) O Weinberg	6	2	6
2	(Spain) T Carbonell (Spain) MA Gorriz	4	6	7

Quarterfinals
1	(Nigeria) N Odizor (South Africa) C van Rensburg	7	4	7
(Israel) S Perkiss (Israel) R Weidenfeld	6	6	6
3	(South Africa) W Ferreira (South Africa) P Norval	5	6	6
(Israel) G Bloom (United States) A Hombrecher	7	4	7
(Netherlands) M Koevermans (Netherlands) J Siemerink	6	6
4	(Sweden) R Båthman (Sweden) R Bergh	7	7
(Sweden) D Engel (United States) J Tarango	3	5
2	(Spain) T Carbonell (Spain) MA Gorriz	6	7

Semifinals
1	(Nigeria) N Odizor (South Africa) C van Rensburg	6	6	6
(Israel) G Bloom (United States) A Hombrecher	4	7	2
4	(Sweden) R Båthman (Sweden) R Bergh	6	6	6
2	(Spain) T Carbonell (Spain) MA Gorriz	7	4	3

Final
1	(Nigeria) N Odizor (South Africa) C van Rensburg	6	6
4	(Sweden) R Båthman (Sweden) R Bergh	3	4
