= 1987 Tel Aviv Open – Doubles =

Doubles
- 1987 Tel Aviv Open

Final
- Champions: (Israel) Gilad Bloom (Israel) Shahar Perkiss
- Runners-up: (West Germany) Wolfgang Popp (Netherlands) Huub van Boeckel
- Score: 6–2, 6–4

Events
Singles	Doubles
← 1986 ·	Tel Aviv Open	· 1988 →

John Letts and Peter Lundgren were the defending champions, but Letts did not participate this year. Lundgren partnered Jeremy Bates, losing in the quarterfinals.

Gilad Bloom and Shahar Perkiss won the title, defeating Wolfgang Popp and Huub van Boeckel 6–2, 6–4 in the final.

== Seeds ==
1. (South Africa) Brian Levine / (South Africa) Christo Steyn (semifinals)
2. (Sweden) Ronnie Båthman / (United Kingdom) Andrew Castle (first round)
3. (United States) Brad Gilbert / (Israel) Amos Mansdorf (first round)
4. (West Germany) Wolfgang Popp / (Netherlands) Huub van Boeckel (final)

== Draw ==
=== Key ===
- Q = Qualifier
- WC = Wild card
- LL = Lucky loser
- Alt = Alternate
- SE = Special exempt
- PR = Protected ranking
- ITF = ITF entry
- JE = Junior exempt
- w/o = Walkover
- r = Retired
- d = Defaulted
- SR = Special ranking

=== Draw ===
First round
1	(South Africa) B Levine (South Africa) C Steyn	7	6
(West Germany) P Moraing (West Germany) M Westphal	5	3
(Israel) Yoram Baron (Israel) T Zimmerman	2	6	6
(West Germany) P Baur (West Germany) A Hornung	6	3	4
4	(West Germany) W Popp (Netherlands) H van Boeckel	2	6	6
(South Africa) C Campbell (South Africa) B Moir	6	4	4
(Belgium) E Masso (Italy) A Paris	2	4
(Israel) B Merenstein (Israel) R Weidenfeld	6	6
(United Kingdom) J Bates (Sweden) P Lundgren	6	6
(Denmark) M Christensen (Sweden) S Eriksson	3	2
(Israel) G Bloom (Israel) S Perkiss	2	6	6
3	(United States) B Gilbert (Israel) A Mansdorf	6	4	1
(Israel) M Daniel (Israel) A Naor	3	2
(Sweden) D Engel (Sweden) T Nydahl	6	6
(West Germany) H-D Beutel (Israel) S Glickstein	6	3	7
2	(Sweden) R Båthman (United Kingdom) A Castle	2	6	6

Quarterfinals
1	(South Africa) B Levine (South Africa) C Steyn	1	7	6
(Israel) Y Baron (Israel) T Zimmerman	6	6	1
4	(West Germany) W Popp (Netherlands) H van Boeckel	6	6
(Israel) B Merenstein (Israel) R Weidenfeld	2	4
(United Kingdom) J Bates (Sweden) P Lundgren	4	7	4
(Israel) G Bloom (Israel) S Perkiss	6	6	6
(Sweden) D Engel (Sweden) T Nydahl	6	7
(West Germany) H-D Beutel (Israel) S Glickstein	3	6

Semifinals
1	(South Africa) B Levine (South Africa) C Steyn	2	4
4	(West Germany) W Popp (Netherlands) H van Boeckel	6	6
(Israel) G Bloom (Israel) S Perkiss	6	6	6
(Sweden) D Engel (Sweden) T Nydahl	7	4	4

Final
4	(West Germany) W Popp (Netherlands) H van Boeckel	2	4
(Israel) G Bloom (Israel) S Perkiss	6	6
