= 1988 Tel Aviv Open – Doubles =

Doubles
- 1988 Tel Aviv Open

Final
- Champions: (The Bahamas) Roger Smith (Kenya) Paul Wekesa
- Runners-up: (West Germany) Patrick Baur (West Germany) Alexander Mronz
- Score: 6–3, 6–3

Events
Singles	Doubles
← 1987 ·	Tel Aviv Open	· 1989 →

Gilad Bloom and Shahar Perkiss were the defending champions, but lost in the first round this year.

Roger Smith and Paul Wekesa won the title, defeating Patrick Baur and Alexander Mronz 6–3, 6–3 in the final.

== Seeds ==
1. (Israel) Amos Mansdorf / (South Africa) Christo van Rensburg (semifinals)
2. (United States) Scott Davis / (United States) Brad Gilbert (quarterfinals)
3. (Brazil) Danilo Marcelino / (Brazil) Mauro Menezes (first round)
4. (West Germany) Patrick Baur / (West Germany) Alexander Mronz (final)

== Draw ==
=== Key ===
- Q = Qualifier
- WC = Wild card
- LL = Lucky loser
- Alt = Alternate
- SE = Special exempt
- PR = Protected ranking
- ITF = ITF entry
- JE = Junior exempt
- w/o = Walkover
- r = Retired
- d = Defaulted
- SR = Special ranking

=== Draw ===
First round
1	(Israel) A Mansdorf (South Africa) C van Rensburg	6	7
(Israel) G Bloom (Israel) S Perkiss	3	6
(Sweden) R Båthman (New Zealand) D Lewis	6	6
(Israel) S Glickstein (Israel) O Weinberg	3	4
3	(Brazil) D Marcelino (Brazil) M Menezes	4	6
(Sweden) C Allgårdh (Sweden) D Engel	6	7
(The Bahamas) R Smith (Kenya) P Wekesa	7	4	6
(Israel) A Naor (Israel) Menashe Tzur	5	6	3
(Brazil) J Soares (West Germany) M Westphal	6	6
(United States) L Jensen (West Germany) D Keretić	1	3
(Austria) A Antonitsch (Belgium) L Pimek	4	6	6
4	(West Germany) P Baur (West Germany) A Mronz	6	4	7
(Australia) M Fancutt (South Africa) B Talbot	3	4
(New Zealand) S Guy (South Africa) B Levine	6	6
(Israel) M Daniel (Israel) R Weidenfeld	1	3
2	(United States) S Davis (United States) B Gilbert	6	6

Quarterfinals
1	(Israel) A Mansdorf (South Africa) C van Rensburg	6	6	6
(Sweden) R Båthman (New Zealand) D Lewis	3	7	2
(Sweden) C Allgårdh (Sweden) D Engel	2	3
(The Bahamas) R Smith (Kenya) P Wekesa	6	6
(Brazil) J Soares (West Germany) M Westphal	7	6	5
4	(West Germany) P Baur (West Germany) A Mronz	5	7	7
(New Zealand) S Guy (South Africa) B Levine	7	6
2	(United States) S Davis (United States) B Gilbert	6	4

Semifinals
1	(Israel) A Mansdorf (South Africa) C van Rensburg	6	6	4
(The Bahamas) R Smith (Kenya) P Wekesa	3	7	6
4	(West Germany) P Baur (West Germany) A Mronz	7	3	6
(New Zealand) S Guy (South Africa) B Levine	5	6	2

Final
(The Bahamas) R Smith (Kenya) P Wekesa	6	6
4	(West Germany) P Baur (West Germany) A Mronz	3	3
