= 1987 Tel Aviv Open – Singles =

Singles
- 1987 Tel Aviv Open

Final
- Champion: (Israel) Amos Mansdorf
- Runner-up: (United States) Brad Gilbert
- Score: 3–6, 6–3, 6–4

Events
Singles	Doubles
← 1986 ·	Tel Aviv Open	· 1988 →

Brad Gilbert was the defending champion.

Amos Mansdorf won the tournament, beating Gilbert in the final, 3–6, 6–3, 6–4.

== Seeds ==
1. (United States) Jimmy Connors (semifinals)
2. (United States) Brad Gilbert (final)
3. (Israel) Amos Mansdorf (champion)
4. (Sweden) Peter Lundgren (semifinals)
5. (Sweden) Stefan Eriksson (second round)
6. (West Germany) Wolfgang Popp (quarterfinals)
7. (South Africa) Barry Moir (first round)
8. (Israel) Gilad Bloom (quarterfinals)

== Draw ==
=== Key ===
- Q = Qualifier
- WC = Wild card
- LL = Lucky loser
- Alt = Alternate
- SE = Special exempt
- PR = Protected ranking
- ITF = ITF entry
- JE = Junior exempt
- w/o = Walkover
- r = Retired
- d = Defaulted
- SR = Special ranking

=== Finals ===
Semifinals
1	(United States) Jimmy Connors	6	3
3	(Israel) Amos Mansdorf	7	6
4	(Sweden) Peter Lundgren	3	3
2	(United States) Brad Gilbert	6	6

Final
3	(Israel) Amos Mansdorf	3	6	6
2	(United States) Brad Gilbert	6	3	4

=== Top half ===
First round
1	(United States) J Connors	6	6
(Italy) A Paris	1	2
(West Germany) H-D Beutel	6	2	6
(West Germany) M Westphal	2	6	7
(Sweden) R Båthman	3	5
(Netherlands) H van Boeckel	6	7
(United Kingdom) J Bates	6	6
7	(South Africa) B Moir	2	2
3	(Israel) A Mansdorf	6	7
(Italy) C Panatta	1	5
(Israel) A Naor	7	3	6
Q	(Israel) B Merenstein	5	6	7
(West Germany) P Moraing	3	1
(United Kingdom) A Castle	6	6
(West Germany) P Baur	6	2	3
6	(West Germany) W Popp	3	6	6

Second round
1	(United States) J Connors	6	6
(West Germany) M Westphal	4	2
(Netherlands) H van Boeckel	4	7	7
(United Kingdom) J Bates	6	6	5
3	(Israel) A Mansdorf	6	6
Q	(Israel) B Merenstein	0	2
(United Kingdom) A Castle	7	4	2
6	(West Germany) W Popp	6	6	6

Quarterfinals
1	(United States) J Connors	6	6
(Netherlands) H van Boeckel	1	1
3	(Israel) A Mansdorf	6	6	6
6	(West Germany) W Popp	7	4	2

Semifinals
1	(United States) J Connors	6	3
3	(Israel) A Mansdorf	7	6

=== Bottom half ===
First round
5	(Sweden) S Eriksson	6	6
(Canada) M Wostenholme	2	1
Q	(Sweden) T Nydahl	5	6	5
Q	(South Africa) C Campbell	7	4	7
WC	(Israel) S Glickstein	4	6	3
(Belgium) E Masso	6	1	6
(South Africa) B Levine	0	1
4	(Sweden) P Lundgren	6	6
8	(Israel) G Bloom	3	7	6
(South Africa) C Steyn	6	5	4
(Sweden) D Engel	1	6
(United States) M Dickson	6	7
Q	(Denmark) M Christensen	3	4
(Israel) S Perkiss	6	6
WC	(Israel) R Weidenfeld	3	6	0
2	(United States) B Gilbert	6	4	6

Second round
5	(Sweden) S Eriksson	2	4
Q	(South Africa) C Campbell	6	6
(Belgium) E Masso	6	4
4	(Sweden) P Lundgren	7	6
8	(Israel) G Bloom	6	6
(United States) M Dickson	4	4
(Israel) S Perkiss	1	3
2	(United States) B Gilbert	6	6

Quarterfinals
Q	(South Africa) C Campbell	3	6	2
4	(Sweden) P Lundgren	6	3	6
8	(Israel) G Bloom	3	3
2	(United States) B Gilbert	6	6

Semifinals
4	(Sweden) P Lundgren	3	3
2	(United States) B Gilbert	6	6
