= 1989 Tel Aviv Open – Singles =

Singles
- 1989 Tel Aviv Open

Final
- Champion: (United States) Jimmy Connors
- Runner-up: (Israel) Gilad Bloom
- Score: 2–6, 6–2, 6–1

Details
- Draw: 32
- Seeds: 8

Events
Singles	Doubles
← 1988 ·	Tel Aviv Open	· 1990 →

Brad Gilbert was the defending champion, but he lost in first round.

Jimmy Connors won the tournament, beating Gilad Bloom in the final, 2–6, 6–2, 6–1.

== Seeds ==
1. (United States) Brad Gilbert (first round)
2. (United States) Jimmy Connors (champion)
3. (Israel) Amos Mansdorf (semifinals)
4. (South Africa) Christo van Rensburg (second round, retired)
5. (Netherlands) Paul Haarhuis (first round)
6. (United Kingdom) Chris Bailey (second round)
7. (Puerto Rico) Miguel Nido (quarterfinals)
8. (United States) Kelly Jones (quarterfinals)

== Draw ==
=== Key ===
- Q = Qualifier
- WC = Wild card
- LL = Lucky loser
- Alt = Alternate
- SE = Special exempt
- PR = Protected ranking
- ITF = ITF entry
- JE = Junior exempt
- w/o = Walkover
- r = Retired
- d = Defaulted
- SR = Special ranking

=== Finals ===
Semifinals
(Italy) Gianluca Pozzi	3	7	3
(Israel) Gilad Bloom	6	5	6
3	(Israel) Amos Mansdorf	3	5
2	(United States) Jimmy Connors	6	7

Final
(Israel) Gilad Bloom	6	2	1
2	(United States) Jimmy Connors	2	6	6

=== Top half ===
First round
1	(United States) B Gilbert	7	6	6
(United Kingdom) J Bates	6	7	7
(Brazil) D Marcelino	6	3
(Italy) G Pozzi	7	6
Q	(Israel) A Naor	4	6	7
(Sweden) J Carlsson	6	4	6
(Nigeria) N Odizor	2	5
8	(United States) K Jones	6	7
4	(South Africa) C van Rensburg	6	6
(Belgium) E Masso	4	1
(Israel) G Bloom	6	6
Q	(Sweden) P Henricsson	1	1
(Czechoslovakia) J Čihák	7	4	6
(United Kingdom) N Brown	5	6	3
(West Germany) P Baur	6	0	6
5	(Netherlands) P Haarhuis	2	6	2

Second round
(United Kingdom) J Bates	2	2
(Italy) G Pozzi	6	6
Q	(Israel) A Naor	3	2
8	(United States) K Jones	6	6
4	(South Africa) C van Rensburg	6	2^{r}
(Israel) G Bloom	7	4
(Czechoslovakia) J Čihák	3	6	7
(West Germany) P Baur	6	3	5

Quarterfinals
(Italy) G Pozzi	6	7
8	(United States) K Jones	3	5
(Israel) G Bloom	7	6
(Czechoslovakia) J Čihák	5	1

Semifinals
(Italy) G Pozzi	3	7	3
(Israel) G Bloom	6	5	6

=== Bottom half ===
First round
6	(United Kingdom) C Bailey	6	6
(Sweden) D Engel	4	3
(West Germany) M Zoecke	3	6	6
Q	(Sweden) R Bergh	6	3	3
WC	(Israel) B Merenstein	7	6
(United States) M Anger	6	1
WC	(Israel) M Daniel	3	3
3	(Israel) A Mansdorf	6	6
7	(Puerto Rico) M Nido	3	6	6
(Australia) R Barlow	6	2	4
Q	(New Zealand) S Guy	6	6
(West Germany) A Mronz	4	4
(United Kingdom) N Fulwood	6	3	6
(Sweden) T Nydahl	4	6	7
(Netherlands) M Oosting	2	0
2	(United States) J Connors	6	6

Second round
6	(United Kingdom) C Bailey	6	3
(West Germany) M Zoecke	7	6
WC	(Israel) B Merenstein	2	1
3	(Israel) A Mansdorf	6	6
7	(Puerto Rico) M Nido	7	6
Q	(New Zealand) S Guy	6	4
(Sweden) T Nydahl	1	4
2	(United States) J Connors	6	6

Quarterfinals
(West Germany) M Zoecke	2	7	2
3	(Israel) A Mansdorf	6	6	6
7	(Puerto Rico) M Nido	6	3	3
2	(United States) J Connors	1	6	6

Semifinals
3	(Israel) A Mansdorf	3	5
2	(United States) J Connors	6	7
