= 1990 Riklis Classic – Singles =

Singles
- 1990 Riklis Classic

Final
- Champion: (Soviet Union) Andrei Chesnokov
- Runner-up: (Israel) Amos Mansdorf
- Score: 6–4, 6–3

Details
- Draw: 32
- Seeds: 8

Events
Singles	Doubles
← 1989 ·	Riklis Classic	· 1991 →

Jimmy Connors was the defending champion, but did not participate this year.

Andrei Chesnokov won the tournament, beating Amos Mansdorf in the final, 6–4, 6–3.

== Seeds ==
1. (Soviet Union) Andrei Chesnokov (champion)
2. (Israel) Amos Mansdorf (final)
3. (South Africa) Christo van Rensburg (quarterfinals)
4. (Netherlands) Mark Koevermans (quarterfinals)
5. (Israel) Gilad Bloom (semifinals)
6. (Spain) Tomás Carbonell (second round)
7. N/A
8. (Sweden) David Engel (second round)

== Draw ==
=== Key ===
- Q = Qualifier
- WC = Wild card
- LL = Lucky loser
- Alt = Alternate
- ITF = ITF entry
- PR = Protected ranking
- SR = Special ranking
- SE = Special exempt
- JE = Junior exempt
- JR = Junior Accelerator Programme entrant
- CO = College Accelerator Programme entrant
- NG = Next Gen Accelerator Program entrant
- w/o = Walkover
- r = Retired
- d = Defaulted

=== Finals ===
Semifinals
1	(Soviet Union) Andrei Chesnokov	6	6
5	(Israel) Gilad Bloom	3	3
(United States) Jeff Tarango	1	2
2	(Israel) Amos Mansdorf	6	6

Final
1	(Soviet Union) Andrei Chesnokov	6	6
2	(Israel) Amos Mansdorf	4	3

=== Top half ===
First round
1	(Soviet Union) A Chesnokov	6	6
(Venezuela) N Pereira	3	2
WC	(Israel) E Ran	1	3
(South Africa) M Robertson	6	6
(Sweden) L Jonsson	6	6
(Spain) MA Gorriz	4	4
(Israel) O Weinberg	3	0
8	(Sweden) D Engel	6	6
3	(South Africa) C van Rensburg	6	6
(Netherlands) J Siemerink	1	3
(Israel) A Naor	6	6
Q	(Israel) N Behr	1	0
(South Africa) P Norval	6	7
(Israel) M Daniel	2	6
(Italy) G Pozzi	2	1
5	(Israel) G Bloom	6	6

Second round
1	(Soviet Union) A Chesnokov	7	6
(South Africa) M Robertson	5	4
(Sweden) L Jonsson	0	6	6
8	(Sweden) D Engel	6	4	2
3	(South Africa) C van Rensburg	6	6
(Israel) A Naor	4	2
(South Africa) P Norval	1	4
5	(Israel) G Bloom	6	6

Quarterfinals
1	(Soviet Union) A Chesnokov	6	6
(Sweden) L Jonsson	3	1
3	(South Africa) C van Rensburg	6	6	5
5	(Israel) G Bloom	2	7	7

Semifinals
1	(Soviet Union) A Chesnokov	6	6
5	(Israel) G Bloom	3	3

=== Bottom half ===
First round
6	(Spain) T Carbonell	6	6
Q	(Israel) Shai Friedman	2	1
(United States) J Tarango	6	6
(Germany) P Vojtischek	3	2
WC	(Israel) B Merenstein	4	4
(United States) A Hombrecher	6	6
Q	(Israel) O Motevassel	3	6	2
4	(Netherlands) M Koevermans	6	1	6
LL	(Israel) Yuval Karutzi	5	6	3
Q	(Israel) Gil Kovalski	7	2	6
WC	(Israel) Yuval Hirsch	0	1
(Nigeria) N Odizor	6	6
(Israel) S Perkiss	6	6
(South Africa) W Ferreira	3	4
(Israel) R Weidenfeld	3	1
2	(Israel) A Mansdorf	6	6

Second round
6	(Spain) T Carbonell	2	5
(United States) J Tarango	6	7
(United States) A Hombrecher	4	4
4	(Netherlands) M Koevermans	6	6
Q	(Israel) Gil Kovalski	1	4
(Nigeria) N Odizor	6	6
(Israel) S Perkiss	6	4
2	(Israel) A Mansdorf	7	6

Quarterfinals
(United States) J Tarango	7	6
4	(Netherlands) M Koevermans	6	1
(Nigeria) N Odizor	5	1
2	(Israel) A Mansdorf	7	6

Semifinals
(United States) J Tarango	1	2
2	(Israel) A Mansdorf	6	6
