= 1988 Tel Aviv Open =

Tennis tournament edition

- Date: October 10–15
- Edition: 9th
- Draw: 32S / 16D
- Prize money: $95,000
- Surface: Hard / outdoor
- Location: Ramat HaSharon, Tel Aviv District, Israel
- Venue: Israel Tennis Centers

Champions

Singles
- (United States) Brad Gilbert

Doubles
- (The Bahamas) Roger Smith / (Kenya) Paul Wekesa
← 1987 ·	Tel Aviv Open	· 1989 →

The 1988 Tel Aviv Open was a men's tennis tournament played on outdoor hard courts that was part of the 1988 Nabisco Grand Prix. It was played at the Israel Tennis Centers in the Tel Aviv District city of Ramat HaSharon, Israel from October 10 through October 15, 1988. First-seeded Brad Gilbert won the singles title.

== Finals ==
=== Singles ===
(United States) Brad Gilbert defeated (United States) Aaron Krickstein 4–6, 7–6, 6–2

- It was Gilbert's only singles title of the year and the 12th of his career.

=== Doubles ===
(The Bahamas) Roger Smith / (Kenya) Paul Wekesa defeated (West Germany) Patrick Baur / (West Germany) Alexander Mronz 6–3, 6–3

- It was Smith's only title of the year and the 1st of his career. It was Wekesa's only title of the year and the 1st of his career.
