= 1987 Tel Aviv Open =

- Date: October 12–19
- Edition: 8th
- Category: Grand Prix
- Draw: 32S / 16D
- Prize money: $89,400
- Surface: Hard / outdoor
- Location: Ramat HaSharon, Tel Aviv District, Israel
- Venue: Israel Tennis Centers

Champions

Singles
- (Israel) Amos Mansdorf

Doubles
- (Israel) Gilad Bloom / (Israel) Shahar Perkiss
- Tel Aviv Open

The 1987 Tel Aviv Open was a men's tennis tournament played on outdoor hard courts that was part of the 1987 Nabisco Grand Prix. It was played at the Israel Tennis Centers in the Tel Aviv District city of Ramat HaSharon, Israel from October 12 through October 19, 1987. Third-seeded Amos Mansdorf won the singles title.

== Finals ==
=== Singles ===
(Israel) Amos Mansdorf defeated (United States) Brad Gilbert 3–6, 6–3, 6–4

- It was Mansdorf's only title of the year and the 2nd of his career.

=== Doubles ===
(Israel) Gilad Bloom / (Israel) Shahar Perkiss defeated (West Germany) Wolfgang Popp / (Netherlands) Huub van Boeckel 6–2, 6–4

- It was Bloom's 1st title of the year and the 1st of his career. It was Perkiss' only title of the year and the 1st of his career.
