= Riklis =

Riklis may refer to:

- Tel Aviv Open, tennis tournament formerly named the Riklis Classic
- 1990 Riklis Classic, tennis tournament played on hard courts that was part of the World Series of the 1990 ATP Tour
- 1991 Riklis Classic, tennis tournament played on hard courts that was part of the World Series of the 1991 ATP Tour

== People ==
- Eran Riklis (born 1954), Israeli filmmaker
- Meshulam Riklis (1923–2019), Turkish-Israeli businessman and film producer
