= 1990 Riklis Classic =

- Date: October 8–15
- Edition: 11th
- Category: World Series
- Draw: 32S / 16D
- Prize money: $125,000
- Surface: Hard / outdoor
- Location: Ramat HaSharon, Tel Aviv District, Israel
- Venue: Israel Tennis Centers

Champions

Singles
- (Soviet Union) Andrei Chesnokov

Doubles
- (Nigeria) Nduka Odizor / (South Africa) Christo van Rensburg
← 1989 ·	Tel Aviv Open	· 1991 →

The 1990 Riklis Classic, also known as the Tel Aviv Open, was a men's tennis tournament played on outdoor hard courts that was part of the World Series of the 1990 ATP Tour. It was the 11th edition of the tournament and was played at the Israel Tennis Centers in the Tel Aviv District city of Ramat HaSharon, Israel from October 8 through October 15, 1990. First-seeded Andrei Chesnokov won the singles title.

== Finals ==
=== Singles ===
(Soviet Union) Andrei Chesnokov defeated (Israel) Amos Mansdorf 6–4, 6–3

- It was Chesnokov's 2nd singles title of the year and the 6th of his career.

=== Doubles ===
(Nigeria) Nduka Odizor / (South Africa) Christo van Rensburg defeated (Sweden) Ronnie Båthman / (Sweden) Rikard Bergh 6–3, 6–4

- It was Odizor's 2nd title of the year and the 8th of his career. It was van Rensburg's 2nd title of the year and the 16th of his career.
