= 1989 Tel Aviv Open =

- Date: October 16–23
- Edition: 10th
- Category: Grand Prix
- Draw: 32S / 16D
- Prize money: $100,000
- Surface: Hard / outdoor
- Location: Ramat HaSharon, Tel Aviv District, Israel
- Venue: Israel Tennis Centers

Champions

Singles
- (United States) Jimmy Connors

Doubles
- (United Kingdom) Jeremy Bates / (West Germany) Patrick Baur
← 1988 ·	Tel Aviv Open	· 1990 →

The 1989 Tel Aviv Open was a men's tennis tournament played on hard courts that was part of the 1989 Nabisco Grand Prix. It was played at the Israel Tennis Centers in the Tel Aviv District city of Ramat HaSharon, Israel from October 16 through October 23, 1989. Second-seeded Jimmy Connors won the singles title.

== Finals ==
=== Singles ===
(United States) Jimmy Connors defeated (Israel) Gilad Bloom 2–6, 6–2, 6–1

- It was Connors' 2nd title of the year and the 109nd of his career.

=== Doubles ===
(United Kingdom) Jeremy Bates / (West Germany) Patrick Baur defeated (Sweden) Rikard Bergh / (Sweden) Per Henricsson 6–1, 4–6, 6–1

- It was Bates' only title of the year and the 1st of his career. It was Baur's only title of the year and the 2nd of his career.
