= 1991 Riklis Classic =

- Date: October 7–14
- Edition: 12th
- Category: World Series
- Draw: 32S / 16D
- Prize money: $125,000
- Surface: Hard / outdoor
- Location: Ramat HaSharon, Tel Aviv District, Israel
- Venue: Israel Tennis Centers

Champions

Singles
- (Mexico) Leonardo Lavalle

Doubles
- (Czechoslovakia) David Rikl / (Netherlands) Michiel Schapers
← 1990 ·	Tel Aviv Open	· 1992 →

The 1991 Riklis Classic, also known as the Tel Aviv Open, was a men's tennis tournament played on hard courts that was part of the World Series of the 1991 ATP Tour. It was played at the Israel Tennis Centers in the Tel Aviv District city of Ramat HaSharon, Israel from October 7 through October 14, 1991. Unseeded Leonardo Lavalle, who entered the main draw as a qualifier, won the singles title.

== Finals ==
=== Singles ===
(Mexico) Leonardo Lavalle defeated (South Africa) Christo van Rensburg 6–2, 3–6, 6–3

- It was Lavalle's only title of the year and the 4th of his career.

=== Doubles ===
(Czechoslovakia) David Rikl / (Netherlands) Michiel Schapers defeated (Argentina) Javier Frana / (Mexico) Leonardo Lavalle 6–2, 6–7, 6–3

- It was Rikl's only title of the year and the 1st of his career. It was Schapers' only title of the year and the 3rd of his career.
