= Ohad Weinberg =

Israeli tennis player (born 1971)

- Native name: אוהד וינברג
- Country (sports): Israel
- Born: 19 March 1971 (age 54)

Singles
- Career record: 0–2
- Highest ranking: No. 314 (9 Sep 1991)

Doubles
- Career record: 0–2
- Highest ranking: No. 454 (25 Feb 1991)

Ohad Weinberg (Hebrew: אוהד וינברג; born 19 March 1971) is an Israeli former professional tennis player.

Weinberg competed in the junior draw at Wimbledon in 1989, where he won a match against Leander Paes. He twice featured in the singles main draw of the ATP Tour tournament in Tel Aviv and reached a best world ranking of 314.

== ATP Challenger finals ==
=== Doubles: 1 (0–1) ===
Result	No.	Date	Tournament	Surface	Partner	Opponents	Score
Loss	1.	Apr 1988	Jerusalem, Israel	Hard	(Israel) Menashe Tzur	(Israel) Shlomo Glickstein (Israel) Shahar Perkiss	6–3, 3–6, 3–6
