= Craig Campbell (tennis) =

South African tennis player

- Country (sports): South Africa
- Residence: Fort Lauderdale, Florida, United States
- Born: 18 July 1963 (age 61); Cape Town, South Africa
- Height: 6 ft 3 in (1.91 m)
- Turned pro: 1986
- Plays: Right-handed
- Prize money: $65,931

Singles
- Career record: 7–14
- Career titles: 0
- Highest ranking: No. 183 (12 May 1986)

Grand Slam singles results
- US Open: 1R (1986, 1989)

Doubles
- Career record: 9–27
- Career titles: 0
- Highest ranking: No. 169 (11 August 1986)

Grand Slam doubles results
- French Open: 1R (1986)
- US Open: 1R (1986)

Mixed doubles

Grand Slam mixed doubles results
- French Open: QF (1990)
- Wimbledon: 1R (1990)

Craig Campbell (born 18 July 1963) is a former professional tennis player from South Africa.

== Career ==
Campbell, who played collegiate tennis for the University of Miami, made the round of 16 at the 1984 Japan Open Tennis Championships, defeating world number 63 Nduka Odizor en route. Partnering Joey Rive, Campbell was a losing doubles finalist at the Swedish Open in 1986. The following year, he reached the singles quarter-finals in the Tel Aviv Open.

He was only able to progress past the first round of a Grand Slam tournament once, which was at the 1990 French Open, in the mixed doubles with Mary Pierce. His two appearances in the main singles draw ended in disappointment. In the 1986 US Open he squandered a two set lead to lose to Bob Green and he was defeated in another five set match at the 1989 US Open, to Peter Lundgren.

== Grand Prix career finals ==
=== Doubles: 1 (0–1) ===
Result	W/L	Date	Tournament	Surface	Partner	Opponents	Score
Loss	0–1	Jul 1986	Båstad, Sweden	Clay	(United States) Joey Rive	(Spain) Sergio Casal (Spain) Emilio Sánchez	4–6, 2–6
