= Roger Smith (tennis) =

Bahamian tennis player

- Country (sports): Bahamas
- Residence: Freeport, Bahamas
- Born: 20 January 1964 (age 62) Freeport, Bahamas
- Height: 1.85 m (6 ft 1 in)
- Turned pro: 1987
- Retired: 2002
- Plays: Right-handed (one-handed backhand)
- College: Ohio State
- Prize money: $528,200

Singles
- Career record: 42–66
- Career titles: 0
- Highest ranking: No. 96 (1 August 1988)

Grand Slam singles results
- Australian Open: 1R (1988, 1989, 1994)
- French Open: 1R (1989)
- Wimbledon: 1R (1989)
- US Open: 3R (1994)

Other tournaments
- Olympic Games: 1R (1992)

Doubles
- Career record: 91–124
- Career titles: 3
- Highest ranking: No. 73 (4 March 1991)

Grand Slam doubles results
- Australian Open: 2R (1997)
- French Open: 2R (1994)
- Wimbledon: 1R (1988, 1989, 1990, 1991, 1997)
- US Open: QF (1990)

Other doubles tournaments
- Olympic Games: 2R (1996)

Mixed doubles
- Career record: 4–12
- Career titles: 0

Grand Slam mixed doubles results
- Australian Open: 2R (1990)
- French Open: 2R (1989, 1990)
- Wimbledon: 2R (1991)
- US Open: 1R (1990, 1991)

Roger Smith (born 20 January 1964) is a former tennis player from the Bahamas.

Smith turned professional in 1987. The right-hander reached his highest singles ATP-ranking on 1 August 1988, when he became World Number 96 making him the highest singles ranked Bahamian in history along with Mark Knowles.

== Career highlights ==
Smith played for Ohio State University for four years finishing his collegiate career in 1986. While a senior, he earned All-America honors. Also, he won the Ohio Inter-Collegiate Championship by besting a scrappy sophomore from Bowling Green State University, Ken Bruce, in a thrilling final 4−6, 6−2, 6−1. Bruce would go on to win the singles title the next year.

=== 1986 ===
Smith played two singles and one doubles matches in Davis Cup for the then Caribbean Davis Cup team in March in a tie against Brazil losing to Cássio Motta in four sets and in doubles partnering Doug Burke in live rubbers. He did not appear in any tour grand prix or challenger events and finished the year ranked (on 29 December) World No. 482 and No. 610T in doubles.

=== 1987 ===
Smith won his next Davis Cup match, in a tie played in Nassau, in four sets over Chilean Robinson Ureta, but lost the deciding rubber to Ricardo Acuña in five sets, as the Caribbean lost in their final tie as a team 2−3. (From then Caribbean nations have competed separately.) Smith reached the finals of the Coquitlam Challenger, partnering Puerto Rican player Juan-Oscar Rios. He reached the second round of the 1987 US Open defeating Marián Vajda before losing to Jim Grabb, and won two tournaments in November – the 1987 Bossonnens Challenger in singles, defeating Alexander Mronz in the final, and the Munich Challenger in doubles partnering Tony Mmoh. The final Nabisco Grand Prix ranking release for the year had Smith ranked World No. 146 in singles and No. 219 in doubles.

=== 1988 ===
Smith went up on World No. 8 Yannick Noah 2 sets to love before losing 14−16 in the fifth in the first round of the 1988 Australian Open. He and partner Paul Wekesa reached the semi-finals in doubles of the grand prix tournament in Washington. The following week Smith famously knocked off World No. 1 Ivan Lendl in the second round of the Volvo International in Stratton Mountain, Vermont, 6−2, 6−3, in a match Lendl, forced by the grand prix tour to play this tournament, seemingly tanked. Smith went on to reach the quarters, losing to Darren Cahill in three sets. This result saw Smith reach his career high singles ranking of World No. 96 making him the highest ranked Bahamian in history alongside Mark Knowles.

In October, Smith and Wekesa won the Tel Aviv Challenger, defeating Patrick Baur and Mronz. Roger finished the year World No. 154 in singles and No. 148 in doubles.

=== 1989 ===
In his second tournament of the year, Smith reached the semi-finals of Auckland Outdoor grand prix event, defeating home country favourite Kelly Evernden in the quarters before falling to World No. 26 Amos Mansdorf. At the Australian Open, Smith managed to take the second set before losing in four to World No. 5 Stefan Edberg. The following month, Smith helped the Bahamas Davis Cup team win their first-ever tie, 5−0 over Venezuela. Smith handily defeated Juan Carlos Bianchi in the first rubber before combining John Farrington to win the doubles 10−8 in the fifth. (Farrington was chosen over a then still 17 years of age Mark Knowles, who won the second singles rubber). In April, the Bahamas equalled this success, winning 5−0 over the Dominican Republic, as Smith again won the first rubber and the doubles partnering Farrington. In May he competed for the first time in the main draws at Roland Garros, losing soundly in straight sets to an up-and-coming Michael Stich, and in doubles partnering Brad Pearce. In his next tournament however, the Bristol Open, Smith and partner Nduka Odizor reached the semi-finals. Despite going winless in grand prix events, he continued to have success in doubles during the North American hard court season, reaching the semi-finals of the Player's International in Canada and the third round of the US Open, on both occasions partnering Frenchman Jean-Philippe Fleurian. Then in October playing with Todd Nelson, Smith reached the finals of the grand prix event in Toulouse and the semi-finals in Vienna. Then in November Smith finally found success in singles, winning the Bossonnens Challenger, for the second time in three years. In the final he defeated future World No. 2 Petr Korda in three sets. On 18 December, Smith was World No. 187 in singles and No. 95 in doubles.

=== 1990 ===
Smith defeated Evernden for a second time before losing to World No. 5 Edberg in three sets at the Lipton International in March. In doubles the week prior, he and Todd Nelson reached the final of the Martinique Challenger. At Key Biscayne, the same partnership went out in the second round. In July in Davis Cup, the Bahamas disappointingly lost to Barbados 1−4. Smith was upset by World No. 1048 Richard Ashby in straight sets in the first rubber, while in the crucial doubles rubber Smith and Farrington lost to Ashby and Bernard Frost 4–6 in the fifth.

After not getting past the second round in doubles in events leading up to August, Smith and partner Shane Burr reached the quarters in New Haven Grand Prix before reaching the quarters of the US Open playing alongside Andrew Castle. Smith's success in doubles continued as he and partner Otis Smith reached the finals in his next tournament, the Coquitlam Challenger in September. In Brazil in October/November, Smith won the Rio de Janeiro Challenger, reached the finals of the Ilheus Challenger, and the semis in São Paulo and Itaparica, all partnering Swede Tobias Svantesson. Then in Bossonnens, Smith won again, this time playing with Michiel Schapers. In singles he reached the quarter-finals in Rio de Janeiro and Bossonnens, but otherwise had an uneventful year. He finished 1990 World No. 261 in singles and No. 78 in doubles.

=== 1991 ===
Smith's high doubles ranking allowed him to compete in all the big tournaments of the Australian tennis season, the American indoor season, outdoors in Florida, and the European clay court season, but he and partners Castle (2), Odizor (1), Tomás Carbonell (1), Svantesson (7), and Shelby Cannon (1) failed to get past the second round until he and Cannon reached the semis in Bologna in May. They lost in the first round of the French and then Smith and Schapers did likewise at Wimbledon.

Smith redeemed himself from the previous year's disappointment in Davis Cup by first winning all three of his live rubbers to see the Bahamas past Costa Rica 4−1 in February. The following month saw a rematch with Caribbean rival Barbados, played at Carnival Crystal Palace. Smith opened with an easy win over Lionel Eli before Farrington lost in four sets to Ashby. Ashby and Frost won the doubles over Smith and Farrington, 14–12 in the fifth, to give the visitors a 2–1 match lead. Smith next defeated Ashby 7–5, 7–5, 5–7, 6–4, leaving Farrington to beat the unheralded Eli, but not before some drama, 6–2, 5–7, 6–7, 6–4, 6–4. The Bahamians run would come to an end at the hands of Colombia in July on red clay in Cali. Although Smith and Farrington managed to take the doubles rubber in straight sets, Maricio Hadad beat Smith in the opening rubber in four sets while Álvaro Jordan beat Roger in five in the deciding fourth rubber.

Smith's poor run continued during the summer and it was not until September that he won a tournament, in Brasília partnering Cannon. Here Smith saw his first singles action (in a tournament main draw, at any rate), reaching the third round. In earlier October he and Cannon reached the final of the Ponte Vedra Challenger. Smith again played October on the Brazilian challenger circuit, in doubles, but lost in each tourney in the first round. In singles, once again, playing in Bossonnens brought him fortune, as he reached the semi-finals. In December at the Guan Challenger he reached the quarters. On 23 December, Smith's ATP singles ranking was World No. 307 whilst in doubles he was No. 104.

=== 1992 ===
After opening the year with a first round doubles loss at the Australian Open, Smith helped the Bahamas defeat the Organisation of Eastern Caribbean States 4−1 and then Peru 3−2, to begin a run that would see the tiny Caribbean nation reach World Group Qualifying Round in the autumn of 2003. The win over OECS was not an easy one as it took Smith four sets to dispatch with Gavaskar Williams in the opening rubber. Farrington lost the next match in five sets to Vernon Lewis but redeemed himself as he and Smith took the doubles rubber in four. Smith then needed to be on top of his game to defeat Lewis 6−2 in the fifth. The following month saw Smith the hero as he won the fifth and deciding rubber, handily as it turned out, over Carlos di Laura. Things started badly however as Smith lost the opening match to tour veteran Jaime Yzaga, as he surrendered a two sets to one lead. The now 20-year-old Mark Knowles took the second handily over Di Laura before teaming with Smith to easily defeat the Peruvians in doubles 3, 2, and 3. Knowles was forced to retire up 2 sets to 1 on serve in the fourth, leaving Roger to mop up for the win.

On tour, Smith continued a run of first and second round defeats in doubles while in singles he managed to reach one final before July, the Itu Challenger in Brazil, which he lost to Robbie Weiss. July saw the Bahamas next Davis Cup tie and success, as they defeated Venezuela in Caracus 5−0. Smith easily defeated the home side's second choice Maurice Ruah 2, 3, and 1 while the fast emerging Knowles handled former Wimbledon junior champion Nicolás Pereira 2, 3, and 4. Smith and Knowles then wrapped the win up taking the doubles rubber over Ruah and Pereira in four sets. The end of July saw Smith qualify for the main singles draw at the 1992 Summer Olympics, where he was defeated in the first round by Russia's Andrei Cherkasov. In doubles, he and Knowles lost in five sets to the top-seeded team of John Fitzgerald and Todd Woodbridge.

Smith and Knowles played the next two weeks on tour as a team, reaching the finals at the Pescara Challenger and the second round of the Segovia Challenger, while in singles in the later tournament Smith reached the quarters. The following week Smith and partner Roberto Saad the final of the Istanbul Challenger. Two weeks later at Flushing Meadows Smith and partner Wekesa lost in the opening round. During the autumn he reached three semi-finals however, partnering Knowles, Daniel Marcos, and Wekesa respectively. He finished the year strongly in singles reaching the final of the Kuala Lumpur-2 Challenger to Chris Wilkinson and in the semis in Guangzhou and Hong Kong. Smith was on the last ranking release for the year World No. 175 in singles and No. 198 in doubles.

=== 1993 ===
Smith began the year smartly reaching the final of the Wellington Challenger in doubles partnering Knowles and the second round in singles. In February Smith won two of three rubbers he competed in as the Bahamas upset Chile in Santiago 3−2. He opened with a straight sets win over Felipe Rivera while Knowles retired from his match against Sergio Cortés while up two sets to one and 2–1 in the fourth. Smith and Knowles won the doubles however, handily, 2, 1, and 3. Smith, however, lost his next rubber, to Cortes 3−6, 1−6, 3−6. This left Knowles to be the hero, as he dismissed Rivera easily 2, 3, and 1. This win allowed the Bahamas to reach America Group 1 semi-finals against Uruguay the following month, with the winner advancing to play the World Group qualifying round, to be played in September. Smith got matters rolling with a decisive win of Diego Pérez in the opening match. In the second rubber Knowles eked out a 5-set win over Uruguay No. 1 Marcelo Filippini. The two Bahamian stars then wrapped the tie up winning the doubles in four sets.

Smith reached the first or second round in a handful of challenger events before taking June off. In July, a refreshed Smith reached the semi-finals of the Aptos Challenger, losing in that round to a young Patrick Rafter. In August he and partner Jean-Philippe Fleurian won the Istanbul Challenger, while the following week in Segovia Smith and Maurice Ruah reached the final. Then in early September he and Bryan Shelton won the doubles title of the Azores Challenger. To qualify for the Davis Cup 1994 World Group the Bahamas needed to upset the Andre Agassi-led U.S. away, in a tie held in late September in Charlotte, North Carolina. The opening tie pitted Agassi and Smith with the later coming up second best 2−6, 2−6, 3−6. In the second rubber, Knowles was up two-sets to one on MaliVai Washington when, again, he retired from the match. This meant the Bahamian tandem needed to win the doubles match to keep their faint hopes for an upset alive. They took the first set in a tie-break but succumbed in four.

Smith bounced back from the Davis Cup disappointment to reach the finals of the Monterrey Challenger, partnering Frenchman Fleurian. The following week he reached the semi-finals of the Ponte Vedra Challenger, while one week later he reached the semis of the Caracas-3 Challenger. Smith finished the year strongly reaching the semi-finals of the Hong Kong Challenger, partnering Kenny Thorne. The final ATP ranking release had him at No. 224 in singles and No. 132 in doubles.

=== 1994 ===
Smith began the year by qualifying for the Australian Open and losing in the first round against 10th seed Magnus Gustafsson in a five-set thriller 6–3, 5–7, 2–6, 6–2, 2–6. After playing in two more ATP tournaments in Mexico and Miami, he solely played ATP challenger events from March to August with his best result coming at the Puerto Vallarta Challenger where he made the semifinals.

After failing to qualify for the French Open and Wimbledon, Smith returned to the tour at the Canada Masters where he won his first round match but lost in the second round to 14th seed MaliVai Washington in three sets. After playing in New Haven where he lost to world No. 8 and eventual champion Boris Becker, he qualified for the US Open in what would be the best result of his career. He won the first and second rounds to play the defending champion and world No. 1 Pete Sampras in the third round. He surprisingly won the opening set but lost the next three set to lose the match 6–4, 2–6, 4–6, 3–6.

Smith would finish the rest of the year by playing in more challenger events with his best result coming at his last tournament of the year at the Sao Luis Challenger where he made the final but lost in three sets. He also made the finals of the doubles draw partnering João Cunha e Silva and won in three sets which would be his best doubles result of the year.

=== 1995–2002 ===
1995 saw a severe dip in form and rankings for Smith in both singles and doubles. His singles ranking dropped from 161 at the beginning of the year to 743 at the end of the year and he failed to make one challenger final in both singles and doubles.

In 1996, Smith won his third and last doubles title at the Shanghai Open once again partnering fellow Bahamian Mark Knowles where they beat 2nd seed Jim Grabb and Michael Tebbutt in the final in three sets. In doubles that year, he would also make the third round of the US Open partnering Shelby Cannon and win the last challenger title of his career at the Tanagura Challenger.

In 1997, Smith played both his last singles and doubles ATP tournaments. His last singles came at the Japan Open after he qualified for the main draw but lost in the first round to fellow qualifier Olivier Delaître in three sets. His last doubles match came after he played in a few more ATP doubles tournaments in 1997 including the US Open, his last grand slam, and the Presidents Cup where he and German Karsten Braasch made the semifinals as the top seed. He played his last ATP doubles tournament and ATP tournament in both singles and doubles at the Romanian Open where he partnered Jeff Tarango and lost in the first round to Luis Lobo and Javier Sánchez in straight sets.

From 1998 to 2000, Smith would only play in Davis Cup matches. He dropped out of the ATP rankings in singles in August 1998 and doubles in November 1998. He received a wildcard into the qualifying draw of the 1999 US Open but lost in the first round to 31st seed Christian Vinck in straight sets.

In May 2002, Smith played his last singles tournament at an ITF tournament in Jamaica where he won his first round match against Ryan Russell in straight sets but lost in the next round to a young Gilles Müller in three sets. One month later in June, he played his last doubles tournament and last career tournament in both singles and doubles. He partnered American Kiantki Thomas and made the semifinals before losing to Luke Bourgeois and Alun Jones in straight sets. The results did put him back into the ATP rankings in both singles and doubles, but he dropped out of both in May and June 2003.

== ATP career finals ==
=== Doubles (3 titles, 1 runner-up) ===
Legend singles
Grand Slam (0)
ATP World Tour Finals (0)
ATP Super 9 / ATP Masters Series (0)
ATP Championship Series / ATP International Gold (0)
ATP World Series / ATP International Series (3)

Result	W-L	Date	Tournament	Surface	Partner	Opponents	Score
Win	1–0	Oct 1988	Tel Aviv Open, Tel Aviv	Hard	(Kenya) Paul Wekesa	(Germany) Patrick Baur (Germany) Alexander Mronz	6–3, 6–3
Loss	1–1	Oct 1989	Toulouse, France	Hard (i)	(The Bahamas) Todd Nelson	(Iran) Mansour Bahrami (France) Éric Winogradsky	2–6, 6–7
Win	2–1	Sep 1991	Brasília Open, Brasília	Carpet	(United States) Kent Kinnear	(Brazil) Ricardo Acioly (Brazil) Mauro Menezes	6–2, 3–6, 7–6
Win	3–1	Jan 1996	Shanghai Open, Shanghai	Carpet (i)	(The Bahamas) Mark Knowles	(United States) Jim Grabb (Australia) Michael Tebbutt	4–6, 6–2, 7–6
