= Oren Motevassel =

Israeli-American tennis player

- Native name: אורן מוטבסל
- Country (sports): Israel; United States
- Born: August 26, 1967 (age 57); Tel Aviv, Israel
- Height: 5 ft 7 in (170 cm)
- Plays: Left-handed
- Prize money: $128,963

Singles
- Career record: 0–7
- Highest ranking: No. 161 (July 14, 1997)

Grand Slam singles results
- Australian Open: Q1 (1998, 1999)
- French Open: Q1 (1999)
- Wimbledon: Q3 (1997)
- US Open: Q3 (1997)

Doubles
- Career record: 1–2
- Highest ranking: No. 285 (October 2, 2000)

Oren Motevassel (Hebrew: אורן מוטבסל; born August 26, 1967) is an Israeli-born American former professional tennis player.

A left-handed player, Motevassel grew up in Israel and didn't begin playing tennis until the age of 15. He moved to the United States in his early 20s as a base for his professional career.

Motevassel broke through for his first USTA satellite title in 1992 and reached a career high singles ranking of 161 in the world, appearing in the qualifying draws of all four grand slam tournaments. At the 1997 Wimbledon Championships he had a 3–0 third set lead over Pat Cash in the final qualifying round, before the Australian veteran rebounded to win.

On the ATP Challenger Tour, Motevassel was a two-time singles finalist and at the GHI Bronx Tennis Classic in 1997 had an upset straight sets win over top-100 player Julian Alonso.

Motevassel competed in the singles main draw of seven ATP Tour events, without registering a win, making his early appearances in his native Tel Aviv Open. In 1997 he took Andrei Cherkasov to a third set at the Legg Mason Classic before having to retire due to the heat, then later in the year lost an opening round match to world number five Carlos Moya at the Bournemouth International.
