= Per Henricsson =

Swedish tennis player

- Country (sports): Sweden
- Born: 9 August 1969 (age 55); Stockholm, Sweden
- Height: 1.91 m (6 ft 3 in)
- Turned pro: 1988

Singles
- Career record: 2–8
- Career titles: 0
- Highest ranking: No. 210 (18 July 1988)

Grand Slam singles results
- Australian Open: Q3 (1991)

Doubles
- Career record: 41–42
- Career titles: 2
- Highest ranking: No. 65 (23 July 1990)

Grand Slam doubles results
- Australian Open: 3R (1990)
- French Open: 1R (1990, 1991)
- US Open: 2R (1990)

Per Henricsson (born 9 August 1969) is a former professional tennis player from Sweden. He enjoyed most of his tennis success while playing doubles. During his career, he won two doubles titles. He achieved a career-high doubles ranking of world No. 65 in 1990.

== Career finals ==
=== Doubles (2 titles, 3 runner-ups) ===
Result	W/L	Date	Tournament	Surface	Partner	Opponents	Score
Win	1–0	1988	Athens, Greece	Clay	(Sweden) Rikard Bergh	(Peru) Pablo Arraya (Czechoslovakia) Karel Nováček	6–4, 7–5
Win	2–0	1989	Båstad, Sweden	Clay	(Sweden) Nicklas Utgren	(Czechoslovakia) Josef Čihák (Czechoslovakia) Karel Nováček	7–5, 6–2
Loss	2–1	1989	Tel Aviv, Israel	Hard	(Sweden) Rikard Bergh	(United Kingdom) Jeremy Bates (Germany) Patrick Baur	1–6, 6–4, 1–6
Loss	2–2	1990	Stuttgart Outdoor, Germany	Clay	(Sweden) Nicklas Utgren	(South Africa) Pieter Aldrich (South Africa) Danie Visser	3–6, 4–6
Loss	2–3	1991	Geneva, Switzerland	Clay	(Sweden) Ola Jonsson	(Spain) Sergi Bruguera (Switzerland) Marc Rosset	6–3, 3–6, 2–6
