= Wolfgang Popp =

German tennis player

- Country (sports): Germany
- Born: 19 May 1959 (age 65); Neu-Isenburg, Hesse, West Germany
- Height: 1.83 m (6 ft 0 in)
- Plays: Right-handed
- Prize money: $213,504

Singles
- Career record: 35–76
- Career titles: 0
- Highest ranking: No. 81 (13 May 1985)

Grand Slam singles results
- Australian Open: 1R (1985)
- French Open: 1R (1981, 1985)
- Wimbledon: 1R (1985)

Doubles
- Career record: 72–101
- Career titles: 1
- Highest ranking: No. 76 (25 May 1987)

Grand Slam doubles results
- Australian Open: 1R (1985)
- French Open: 2R (1981, 1982)
- Wimbledon: 2R (1981)

Wolfgang Popp (born 19 May 1959) is a former professional tennis player from Germany. He enjoyed most of his tennis success while playing doubles. During his career, he won one doubles title and finished runner-up an additional three times. He achieved a career-high doubles ranking of world No. 76 in 1987.

== Career finals ==
=== Doubles (1 win, 3 losses) ===
Result	W–L	Date	Tournament	Surface	Partner	Opponents	Score
Loss	0–1	Nov 1979	Bombay, India	Clay	(West Germany) Thomas Fürst	(United States) Chris Delaney (United States) James Delaney	6–7, 2–6
Loss	0–2	Jul 1982	Stuttgart, West Germany	Clay	(West Germany) Andreas Maurer	(Australia) Mark Edmondson (United States) Brian Teacher	3–6, 1–6
Win	1–2	May 1987	Florence, Italy	Clay	(West Germany) Udo Riglewski	(Italy) Paolo Canè (Italy) Gianni Ocleppo	6–4, 6–3
Loss	1–3	Oct 1987	Tel Aviv, Israel	Hard	(Netherlands) Huub van Boeckel	(Israel) Gilad Bloom (Israel) Shahar Perkiss	2–6, 4–6
