= Israel Tennis & Education Centers =

Coordinates: 32.130605°N 34.838955°E

- Formation: 1976
- Type: Sports – Tennis, Children's Charity
- Headquarters: Ramat HaSharon, Tel Aviv District, Israel
- Location: Israel
- Website: https://itecenters.org/

Israel Tennis & Education Centers (ITEC) (Hebrew: מרכזי הטניס והחינוך בישראל) is a nonprofit organization established in 1976 that operates more than 20 tennis and education centers and 190 tennis courts across Israel. The organization provides tennis instruction, coach training, recreational and competitive programs, and educational initiatives. Its programs serve children, youth, immigrants, refugees, Arab communities, people with disabilities, and low-income families, combining athletic training with educational and social support. ITEC also organizes regional tournaments and offers public access to its courts, facilitating community engagement and recreational play.

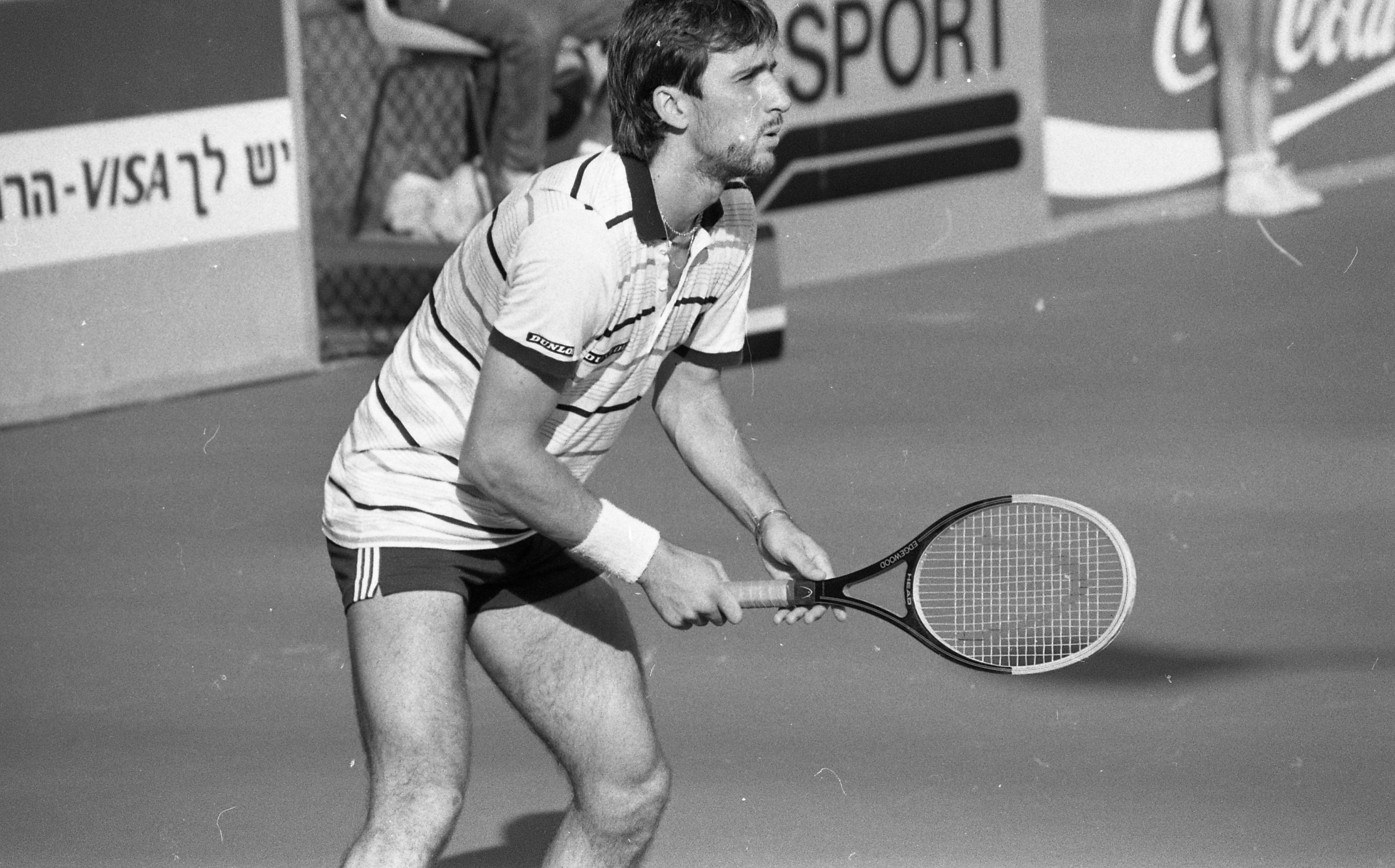
Christoph Zipf taking part in the Tel Aviv Open in Ramat HaSharon, 1983.

== History ==
In 1974, at a time when tennis in Israel was a sport played primarily by tourists as beach hotels, Dr. Ian Froman, Freddie Krivine, Joseph D. Shane, Harold Landesberg, Rubin Josephs, and Dr. William H. Lippy began fundraising efforts to launch tennis as a sport in Israel and to build a National Tennis Center on an old strawberry patch in Ramat HaSharon given to the ITC by the government. On April 25, 1976, Leah Rabin cut the ribbon to the Center, and 250 children signed up to participate. Canadian pioneers of the Centers included Joseph Frieberg, Gerry Goldberg, Ralph Halbert, and Harold Green. Their fundraising efforts laid the financial foundation for Canada Stadium, where the Davis Cup and Fed Cup were hosted in Israel until 2009, and the construction and maintenance of the centers, as well as provision of equipment to the children, were funded without any government assistance.

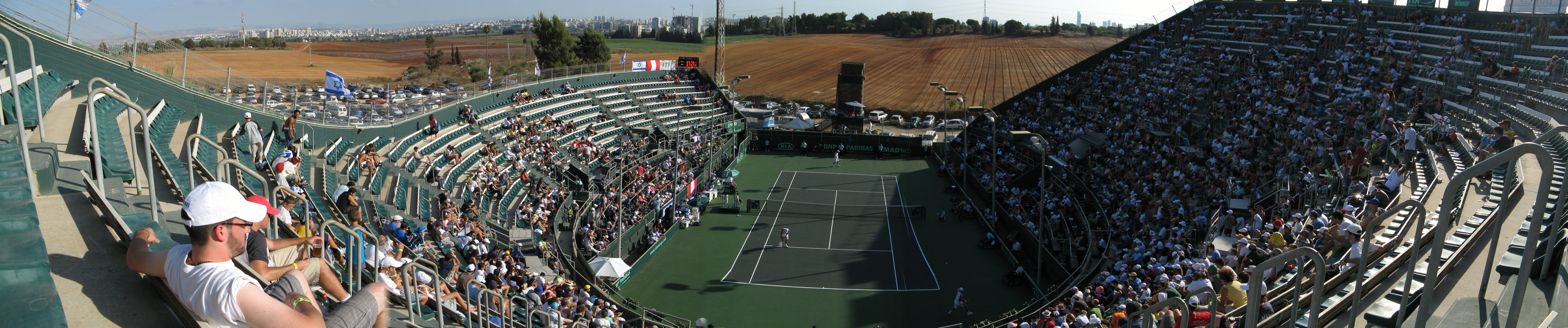
Canada Stadium; 2008

By 2008, about 350,000 Jewish, Christian, and Moslem Israeli children had gone through the seven complexes funded by the ITC, and 1951 Wimbledon champion Dick Savitt was overseeing the coaching techniques. Anna Smashnova moved to Israel with her family in 1990, aged 15, and trained at the ITC; the next year she won the French Open girls title, and in 2002 she reached a career-high ranking of No. 15. In 1991 the ATP donated $5,000 to the ITC, and Argentine tennis player Martín Jaite, who is Jewish, donated $3,000. In 1995, Israeli former Davis Cup player and national champion Gilad Bloom, who was world champion in the under-12 age group, became senior coach role with the ITC.

Thirty years after the centers were begun, in 2006 the first ITC product won a Wimbledon title, as Andy Ram won the 2006 Wimbledon Mixed Doubles title. He had learned his tennis at the ITC's Jerusalem Tennis Center, and Yoni Erlich, his men's doubles partner, had learned his tennis at the Haifa Tennis Center. "I can only find words of esteem for the Israel Tennis Center for their support and help", Ram said after his success.

In 2007, Issy Kramer, Honorary President of the Israel Water Polo Association (IWPA), indicated that he would like to replicate what the ITC has achieved, by building centers throughout Israel, particularly in poorer neighborhoods and development towns. "Swimming, like tennis, should not have to be an elitist sport", he said.

=== Notable alumni ===
The ITEC has to date produced the following top-30 players: Andy Ram (career-high doubles ranking of No. 5); Yoni Erlich (doubles ranking of No. 5); Shahar Pe'er (doubles ranking of No. 14 and singles ranking of No. 11); Anna Smashnova (singles ranking of No. 15); Amos Mansdorf (singles ranking of No. 18); Shlomo Glickstein (singles ranking of No. 22 in 1982; No. 28 in doubles); Dudi Sela (singles ranking of No. 29 in 2009), and Harel Levy (singles ranking of No. 30 in 2001).

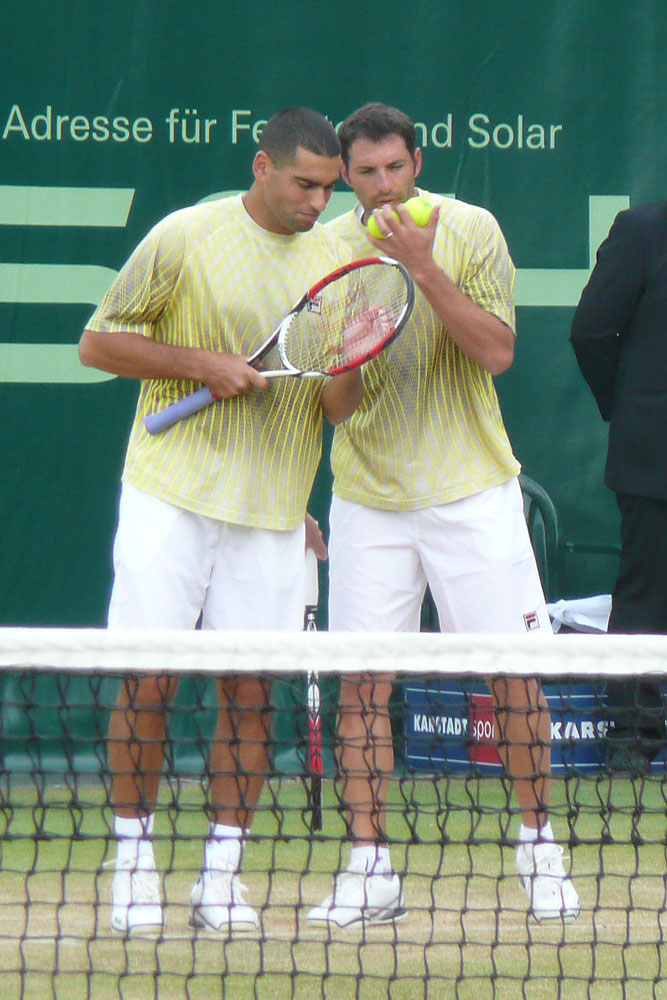
Andy Ram and Yoni Erlich

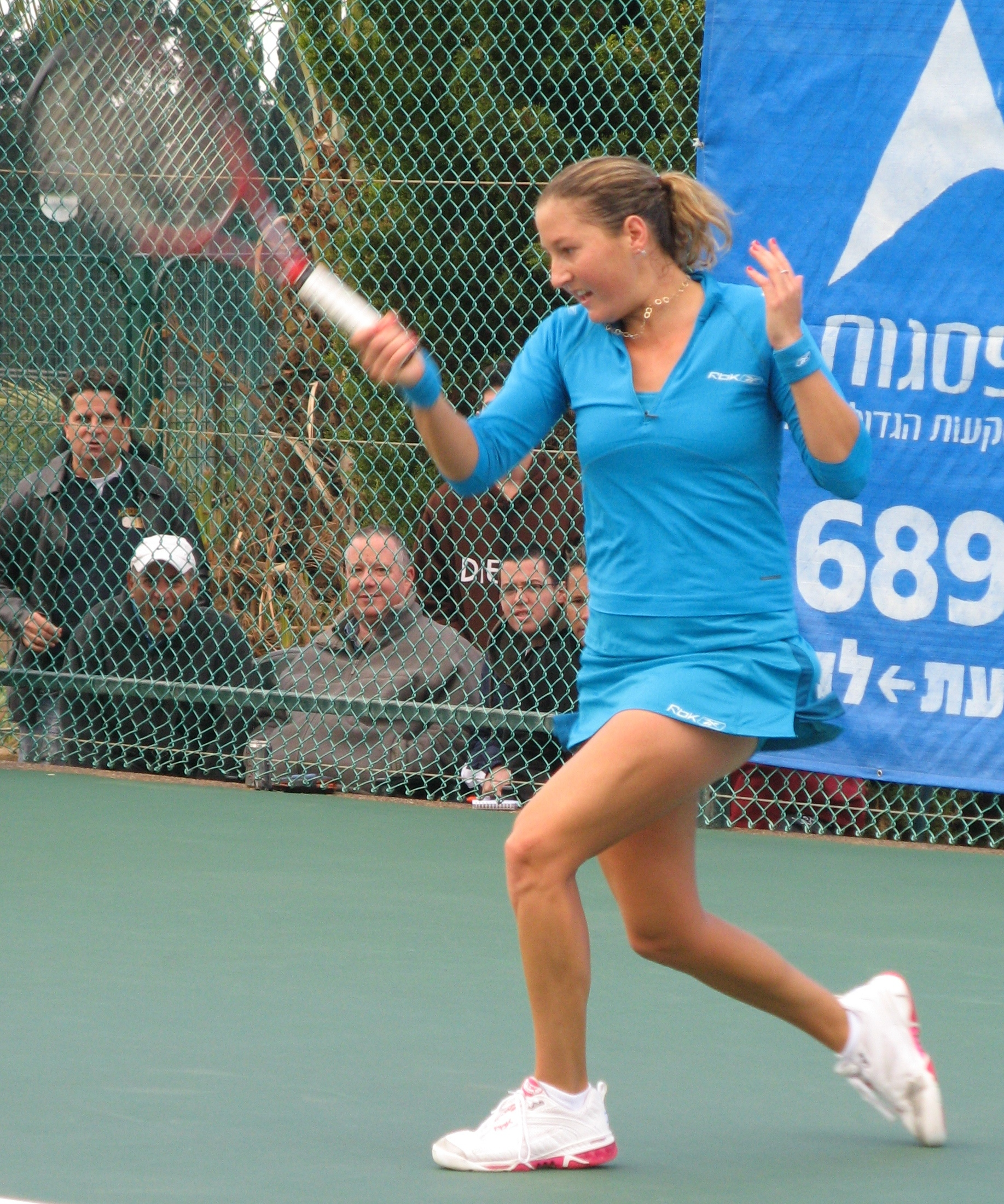
Shahar Pe'er

- Andy Ram (career-high singles ranking of # 187 in 2002, # 5 in doubles)
- Yoni Erlich (career-high singles ranking of # 292, # 5 in doubles)
- Shahar Pe'er (career-high singles ranking of # 11 in 2011; # 14 in doubles)
- Anna Smashnova (career-high singles ranking of # 15 in 2003)
- Amos Mansdorf (career-high singles ranking of # 18 in 1987; # 67 in doubles)
- Shlomo Glickstein (career-high singles ranking of # 22 in 1982; # 28 in doubles)
- Dudi Sela (career-high singles ranking of # 29 in 2009)
- Harel Levy (career-high singles ranking of # 30 in 2001)
- Shahar Perkiss (career-high singles ranking of # 53 in 1985)
- Gilad Bloom (career-high singles ranking of # 61 in 1990; # 62 in doubles)
- Eyal Ran (career-high singles ranking of # 138 in 1997, # 71 in doubles)
- Tzipora Obziler (career-high singles ranking of # 75 in 2007)
- Amir Hadad (career-high singles ranking of # 180 in 2003, # 87 in doubles)
- Noam Okun (career-high singles ranking of # 95 in 2002)
- Noam Behr (career-high singles ranking of # 127 in 2001, # 109 in doubles)
- Hila Rosen (career-high singles ranking of # 138 in 1999)
- Ilana Berger (career-high singles ranking of # 149 in 1992)
- Oren Motevassel (career-high singles ranking of # 161 in 1997)
- Yevgenia Savransky (career-high singles ranking of # 172 2006)

== See also ==
- Sports in Israel
