= Rikard Bergh =

Swedish tennis player

- Country (sports): Sweden
- Born: 14 June 1966 (age 59) Örebro, Sweden
- Died: 14 October 2025 (aged 59) Duncanville Texas, United States
- Height: 1.88 m (6 ft 2 in)
- Turned pro: 1987
- Plays: Left-handed
- Prize money: $488,500

Singles
- Career record: 3–11
- Career titles: 0
- Highest ranking: No. 158 (10 Jul 1989)

Doubles
- Career record: 121–140
- Career titles: 6
- Highest ranking: No. 37 (2 March 1992)

Grand Slam doubles results
- Australian Open: 4R (1992, 1995)
- French Open: 2R (1993, 1994)
- Wimbledon: SF (1993)
- US Open: QF (1991)

Mixed doubles

Grand Slam mixed doubles results
- Australian Open: 1R (1992)
- French Open: 2R (1991, 1997)
- Wimbledon: QF (1996)
- US Open: 2R (1993, 1996)

Rikard Bergh (born 14 June 1966) is a former professional tennis player from Sweden. He enjoyed most of his tennis success while playing doubles. During his career, he won six doubles titles and finished as a runner-up five times. He achieved a career-high doubles ranking of world No. 37 in 1992.

Since retiring, Bergh moved to Dallas, Texas He has worked as a pro in several country clubs.

== Career finals ==
=== Doubles: 11 (6 wins, 5 losses) ===
| Result | No. | Year | Tournament | Surface | Partner | Opponents | Score |
|---|---|---|---|---|---|---|---|
| Win | 1. | 1988 | Athens, Greece | Clay | (Sweden) Per Henricsson | (Peru) Pablo Arraya (Czech Republic) Karel Nováček | 6–4, 7–5 |
| Loss | 1. | 1989 | Tel Aviv, Israel | Hard | (Sweden) Per Henricsson | (United Kingdom) Jeremy Bates (Germany) Patrick Baur | 1–6, 6–4, 1–6 |
| Win | 2. | 1990 | Båstad, Sweden | Clay | (Sweden) Ronnie Båthman | (Sweden) Jan Gunnarsson (Germany) Udo Riglewski | 6–1, 6–4 |
| Loss | 2. | 1990 | Tel Aviv, Israel | Hard | (Sweden) Ronnie Båthman | (Nigeria) Nduka Odizor (South Africa) Christo van Rensburg | 3–6, 4–6 |
| Loss | 3. | 1991 | San Francisco, U.S. | Carpet | (Sweden) Ronnie Båthman | (Australia) Wally Masur (Australia) Jason Stoltenberg | 6–4, 6–7, 4–6 |
| Win | 3. | 1991 | Nice, France | Clay | (Sweden) Jan Gunnarsson | (Czech Republic) Vojtěch Flégl (Sweden) Nicklas Utgren | 6–4, 4–6, 6–3 |
| Win | 4. | 1991 | Båstad, Sweden | Clay | (Sweden) Ronnie Båthman | (Sweden) Magnus Gustafsson (Sweden) Anders Järryd | 6–4, 6–4 |
| Loss | 4. | 1991 | Birmingham, England | Carpet | (Sweden) Ronnie Båthman | (Netherlands) Jacco Eltingh (Kenya) Paul Wekesa | 5–7, 5–7 |
| Win | 5. | 1993 | Charlotte, U.S. | Clay | (United States) Trevor Kronemann | (Argentina) Javier Frana (Mexico) Leonardo Lavalle | 6–1, 6–2 |
| Win | 6. | 1994 | Madrid, Spain | Clay | (Netherlands) Menno Oosting | (France) Jean-Philippe Fleurian (Switzerland) Jakob Hlasek | 6–3, 6–4 |
| Loss | 5. | 1996 | Amsterdam, Netherlands | Clay | (United States) Jack Waite | (United States) Donald Johnson (United States) Francisco Montana | 4–6, 6–3, 2–6 |
