= Alexander Mronz =

German tennis player (born 1965)

- Country (sports): Germany
- Born: 7 April 1965 (age 60) Cologne, West Germany
- Height: 1.88 m (6 ft 2 in)
- Turned pro: 1987
- Retired: 1996
- Plays: Right-handed
- Prize money: $830,234

Singles
- Career record: 61–105
- Career titles: 0
- Highest ranking: No. 73 (8 April 1991)

Grand Slam singles results
- Australian Open: 3R (1994)
- French Open: 1R (1989, 1991)
- Wimbledon: 4R (1995)
- US Open: 2R (1992)

Doubles
- Career record: 49–81
- Career titles: 1
- Highest ranking: No. 74 (3 October 1984)

Grand Slam doubles results
- Australian Open: 1R (1988, 1989, 1990, 1991, 1994)
- French Open: 2R (1989, 1990)
- Wimbledon: 1R (1994, 1995)
- US Open: 1R (1994)

Alexander Mronz (born 7 April 1965) is a former tennis player from Germany, who turned professional in 1987.

Mronz played right-handed, and won one doubles title (1988, Schenectady) in his career. Mronz reached his highest individual ranking on the ATP Tour on April 8, 1991, when he became the world No. 73.

Mronz is famous for being the opponent of Jeff Tarango in a third round match at 1995 Wimbledon, having already knocked out Sjeng Schalken and Kenneth Carlsen to get to that stage. Mronz was leading by a set and a break, when Tarango was defaulted after losing his temper with the umpire, Bruno Rebeuh, following a couple of code violations. Tarango walked off the court in anger. Tarango's wife, Benedict, later slapped Rebeuh across the face. Mronz then lost to the world No. 1, Andre Agassi, in the fourth round.

Mronz also reached the third round of the 1994 Australian Open, losing from 2 sets up against former world No. 1 and three-time Australian Open champion Mats Wilander (who was currently in the process of coming back to the sport), 6–4, 7–5, 3–6, 4–6, 3–6.

== Career finals ==
=== Doubles (1 title, 4 runner-ups) ===
Result	W/L	Date	Tournament	Surface	Partner	Opponents	Score
Win	1–0	Jul 1988	Schenectady, U.S.	Hard	(United States) Greg Van Emburgh	(United States) Paul Annacone (United States) Patrick McEnroe	6–3, 6–7, 7–5
Loss	1–1	Oct 1988	Tel Aviv, Israel	Hard	(Germany) Patrick Baur	(The Bahamas) Roger Smith (Kenya) Paul Wekesa	3–6, 3–6
Loss	1–2	Jan 1990	Adelaide, Australia	Hard	(Netherlands) Michiel Schapers	(United Kingdom) Andrew Castle (Nigeria) Nduka Odizor	6–7, 2–6
Loss	1–3	Sep 1991	Bordeaux	Hard (i)	(Germany) Patrik Kühnen	(France) Arnaud Boetsch (France) Guy Forget	2–6, 2–6
Loss	1–4	Oct 1993	Sydney, Australia	Hard	(Germany) Lars Rehmann	(United States) Patrick McEnroe (United States) Richey Reneberg	3–6, 5–7
