= Raviv Weidenfeld =

Israeli tennis player

- Full name: Raviv Weidenfeld
- Native name: רביב ויידנפלד
- Country (sports): Israel
- Born: 12 October 1970 (age 54); Herzliya, Israel
- Plays: Right-handed
- Prize money: $75,054

Singles
- Career record: 2–6
- Career titles: 0
- Highest ranking: No. 180 (25 February 1991)

Doubles
- Career record: 4–5
- Career titles: 0
- Highest ranking: No. 243 (9 September 1991)

Raviv Weidenfeld (Hebrew: רביב ויידנפלד; born 12 October 1970) is a former professional tennis player from Israel.

== Biography ==
Born in Herzliya, Weidenfeld had a promising junior career, which included a win over Jim Courier. As a junior he competed in several grand slam events, twice making the round of 16, at the 1986 Wimbledon Championships and 1988 French Open.

Weidenfeld began competing professionally in the late 1980s and represented Israel once in a Davis Cup tie, a 1990 World Group relegation play-off at home against China. In the final reverse singles, Weidenfeld defeated Di Lin in straight sets, to complete a 5-0 whitewash. His ATP Tour main draw appearances came in four editions of the Tel Aviv Open and 1997 tournaments in Indianapolis and Tashkent. He won two Challenger titles, one in singles and one in doubles.

== Challenger titles ==
=== Singles: (1) ===
No.	Year	Tournament	Surface	Opponent	Score
1.	1990	Jerusalem, Israel	Hard	(Israel) Shahar Perkiss	5–7, 6–4, 7–6

=== Doubles: (1) ===
No.	Year	Tournament	Surface	Partner	Opponents	Score
1.	1991	Graz, Austria	Clay	(Sweden) Jan Apell	(Germany) Markus Naewie (Canada) Sébastien Leblanc	6–3, 6–3

== See also ==
- List of Israel Davis Cup team representatives
