= Ronnie Båthman =

Swedish tennis player

- Country (sports): Sweden
- Born: 24 April 1959 (age 65); Koping, Sweden
- Height: 1.83 m (6 ft 0 in)
- Turned pro: 1983
- Plays: Right-handed
- Prize money: $398,055

Singles
- Career record: 9–26
- Career titles: 0
- Highest ranking: No. 139 (24 March 1986)

Grand Slam singles results
- Australian Open: 2R (1984)
- French Open: 1R (1987)
- Wimbledon: 2R (1989)

Doubles
- Career record: 114–145
- Career titles: 3
- Highest ranking: No. 38 (2 November 1992)

Grand Slam doubles results
- Australian Open: 3R (1992)
- French Open: SF (1989)
- Wimbledon: 2R (1992)
- US Open: QF (1991)

Grand Slam mixed doubles results
- Australian Open: 1R (1993)
- French Open: 2R (1992)
- Wimbledon: 1R (1992)
- US Open: QF (1989)

Ronnie Båthman (born 24 April 1959) is a former professional tennis player from Sweden. He enjoyed most of his tennis success while playing doubles. During his career, he won three doubles titles and finished as a runner-up four times. He achieved a career-high doubles ranking of world No. 38 in 1992.

== Career finals ==
=== Doubles (3 wins, 4 losses) ===
Result	No.	Year	Tournament	Surface	Partner	Opponents	Score
Win	1.	1990	Båstad, Sweden	Clay	(Sweden) Rikard Bergh	(Sweden) Jan Gunnarsson (West Germany) Udo Riglewski	6–1, 6–4
Loss	1.	1990	Tel Aviv, Israel	Hard	(Sweden) Rikard Bergh	(Nigeria) Nduka Odizor (South Africa) Christo van Rensburg	3–6, 4–6
Loss	2.	1991	San Francisco, U.S.	Carpet	(Sweden) Rikard Bergh	(Australia) Wally Masur (Australia) Jason Stoltenberg	6–4, 6–7, 4–6
Win	2.	1991	Båstad, Sweden	Clay	(Sweden) Rikard Bergh	(Sweden) Magnus Gustafsson (Sweden) Anders Järryd	6–4, 6–4
Loss	3.	1991	Birmingham, England	Carpet	(Sweden) Rikard Bergh	(Netherlands) Jacco Eltingh (Kenya) Paul Wekesa	5–7, 5–7
Loss	4.	1992	Cologne, Germany	Clay	(Czechoslovakia) Libor Pimek	(Argentina) Horacio de la Peña (Argentina) Gustavo Luza	7–6, 0–6, 2–6
Win	3.	1992	Vienna, Austria	Carpet	(Sweden) Anders Järryd	(United States) Kent Kinnear (Germany) Udo Riglewski	6–3, 7–5
