= Patrick Baur =

German tennis player

- Country (sports): Germany
- Born: 3 May 1965 (age 60) Radolfzell, West Germany
- Height: 1.85 m (6 ft 1 in)
- Turned pro: 1986
- Retired: 1997
- Plays: Right-handed (one-handed backhand)
- Coach: Gunter Bresnik
- Prize money: $709,282

Singles
- Career record: 67–107
- Career titles: 2; 2 Challenger, 0 Futures
- Highest ranking: No. 74 (22 April 1991)

Grand Slam singles results
- Australian Open: 2R (1988, 1992)
- French Open: 1R (1988, 1991)
- Wimbledon: 3R (1995)
- US Open: 2R (1997)

Doubles
- Career record: 38–59
- Career titles: 2; 3 Challenger, 0 Futures
- Highest ranking: No. 64 (1 May 1989)

Grand Slam doubles results
- Australian Open: 2R (1989)
- French Open: 2R (1989)
- Wimbledon: 1R (1989, 1990, 1997)
- US Open: Q2 (1997)
- Last updated on: 1 June 2023.

Patrick Baur (born 3 May 1965) is a German former professional tennis player.

During his career Baur won 2 singles titles and 2 doubles titles. He achieved a career-high singles ranking of World No. 74 in 1991 and a career-high doubles ranking of World No. 64 in 1989.

== ATP career finals ==
=== Singles: 2 (2 titles) ===
Legend Grand Slam Tournaments (0–0) ATP World Tour Finals (0–0) ATP World Tour Masters Series (0–0) ATP Championship Series (0–0) ATP World Series (2–0)	Finals by surface Hard (2–0) Clay (0–0) Grass (0–0) Carpet (0–0)	Finals by setting Outdoors (2–0) Indoors (0–0)

Result	W–L	Date	Tournament	Tier	Surface	Opponent	Score
Win	1–0	Feb 1991	Guarujá, Brazil	World Series	Hard	(Brazil) Fernando Roese	6–2, 6–3
Win	2–0	Apr 1991	Seoul, South Korea	World Series	Hard	(United States) Jeff Tarango	6–4, 1–6, 7–6^{(7–5)}

=== Doubles: 4 (2 titles, 2 runner-ups) ===
Legend Grand Slam Tournaments (0–0) ATP World Tour Finals (0–0) ATP World Tour Masters Series (0–0) ATP Championship Series (0–0) ATP World Series (2–2)	Finals by surface Hard (1–1) Clay (1–0) Grass (0–0) Carpet (0–1)	Finals by setting Outdoors (2–1) Indoors (0–1)

Result	W–L	Date	Tournament	Tier	Surface	Partner	Opponents	Score
Win	1–0	Jul 1988	Båstad, Sweden	Grand Prix	Clay	(Germany) Udo Riglewski	(Sweden) Stefan Edberg (Sweden) Niclas Kroon	6–7, 6–3, 7–6
Loss	1–1	Oct 1988	Tel Aviv, Israel	Grand Prix	Hard	(Germany) Alexander Mronz	(The Bahamas) Roger Smith (Kenya) Paul Wekesa	3–6, 3–6
Win	2–1	Oct 1989	Tel Aviv, Israel	Grand Prix	Hard	(United Kingdom) Jeremy Bates	(Sweden) Rikard Bergh (Sweden) Per Henricsson	6–1, 4–6, 6–1
Loss	2–2	Oct 1992	Taipei, Taiwan	World Series	Carpet	(South Africa) Christo van Rensburg	(Australia) Sandon Stolle (Australia) John Fitzgerald	6–7, 2–6

== ATP Challenger and ITF Futures finals ==
=== Singles: 9 (2–7) ===
Legend ATP Challenger (2–7) ITF Futures (0–0)	Finals by surface Hard (0–6) Clay (0–0) Grass (2–0) Carpet (0–1)

Result	W–L	Date	Tournament	Tier	Surface	Opponent	Score
Win	1–0	Jun 1989	Manchester, United Kingdom	Challenger	Grass	(United Kingdom) Andrew Castle	6–4, 6–7, 7–5
Loss	1–1	May 1990	Bangkok, Thailand	Challenger	Hard	(Czech Republic) Slava Dosedel	3–6, 4–6
Loss	1–2	Oct 1990	Ilhéus, Brazil	Challenger	Hard	(Mexico) Luis-Enrique Herrera	2–6, 2–6
Loss	1–3	Dec 1991	Bossonnens, Switzerland	Challenger	Hard	(South Africa) Christo Van Rensburg	4–6, 6–7
Win	2–3	Jul 1992	Bristol, United Kingdom	Challenger	Grass	(Australia) Jamie Morgan	4–6, 7–6, 6–1
Loss	2–4	Mar 1993	Garmisch, Germany	Challenger	Carpet	(Canada) Martin Laurendeau	0–6, 4–6
Loss	2–5	Jul 1994	Montebello, Canada	Challenger	Hard	(Canada) Sebastien Lareau	6–7, 1–6
Loss	2–6	May 1995	Jerusalem, israel	Challenger	Hard	(Sweden) Thomas Johansson	4–6, 6–7
Loss	2–7	Nov 1995	Réunion Island, Réunion	Challenger	Hard	(United Kingdom) Tim Henman	6–1, 3–6, 6–7

=== Doubles: 13 (3–10) ===
Legend ATP Challenger (3–10) ITF Futures (0–0)	Finals by surface Hard (1–5) Clay (1–1) Grass (1–1) Carpet (0–3)

Result	W–L	Date	Tournament	Tier	Surface	Partner	Opponents	Score
Loss	0–1	Apr 1989	Guadeloupe, Guadeloupe	Challenger	Hard	(Germany) Christian Saceanu	(Israel) Gilad Bloom (United States) Brad Pearce	4–6, 2–6
Loss	0–2	Sep 1992	Singapore, Singapore	Challenger	Hard	(Netherlands) Sander Groen	(Barbados) Martin Blackman (Italy) Laurence Tieleman	4–6, 6–1, 6–7
Loss	0–3	Jul 1994	Seville, Spain	Challenger	Clay	(Germany) Torben Theine	(Spain) Emilio Benfele Álvarez (Spain) Pepe Imaz	1–6, 3–6
Loss	0–4	Oct 1994	Réunion Island, Réunion	Challenger	Hard	(Germany) Michael Geserer	(Netherlands) Hendrik-Jan Davids (Netherlands) Joost Winnink	1–6, 2–6
Loss	0–5	May 1995	Sliema, Malta	Challenger	Hard	(Czech Republic) Tomas Anzari	(South Africa) Marius Barnard (France) Lionel Barthez	5–7, 3–6
Loss	0–6	May 1995	Jerusalem, Israel	Challenger	Hard	(France) Lionel Barthez	(Germany) Dirk Dier (Germany) Christian Saceanu	6–7, 6–7
Loss	0–7	Dec 1995	Velenje, Slovenia	Challenger	Carpet	(Netherlands) Joost Winnink	(United Kingdom) Mark Petchey (United Kingdom) Andrew Richardson	7–6, 4–6, 4–6
Loss	0–8	Jul 1996	Bristol, United Kingdom	Challenger	Grass	(France) Lionel Barthez	(Czech Republic) Petr Pala (United Kingdom) Andrew Richardson	2–6, 4–6
Win	1–8	Aug 1996	Geneva, Switzerland	Challenger	Clay	(Germany) Jens Knippschild	(Switzerland) George Bastl (Switzerland) Michel Kratochvil	6–1, 6–1
Loss	1–9	Nov 1996	Neumünster, Germany	Challenger	Carpet	(Germany) Jens Knippschild	(Netherlands) Stephen Noteboom (Netherlands) Fernon Wibier	3–6, 4–6
Win	2–9	Nov 1996	Port Louis, Mauritius	Challenger	Grass	(Netherlands) Joost Winnink	(Romania) Andrei Pavel (Netherlands) Sander Groen	0–1 ret.
Loss	2–10	Jan 1997	Heilbronn, Germany	Challenger	Carpet	(South Africa) Clinton Ferreira	(France) Olivier Delaitre (France) Stephane Simian	7–6, 3–6, 6–7
Win	3–10	Dec 1997	Eilat, Israel	Challenger	Hard	(Russia) Andrei Cherkasov	(Netherlands) Rogier Wassen (Netherlands) Sander Groen	6–3, 7–6

== Performance timelines ==
Key
W	F	SF	QF	#R	RR	Q#	DNQ	A	NH

(W) winner; (F) finalist; (SF) semifinalist; (QF) quarterfinalist; (#R) rounds 4, 3, 2, 1; (RR) round-robin stage; (Q#) qualification round; (DNQ) did not qualify; (A) absent; (NH) not held; (SR) strike rate (events won / competed); (W–L) win–loss record.

=== Singles ===
Tournament	1987	1988	1989	1990	1991	1992	1993	1994	1995	1996	1997	SR	W–L	Win %
Grand Slam tournaments
Australian Open	A	2R	1R	Q3	A	2R	A	Q1	A	Q1	A	0 / 3	2–3	40%
French Open	A	1R	A	A	1R	A	Q2	A	Q1	Q1	A	0 / 2	0–2	0%
Wimbledon	Q1	Q1	1R	Q2	1R	Q1	Q3	A	3R	A	2R	0 / 4	3–4	43%
US Open	A	A	A	A	1R	A	A	A	A	A	2R	0 / 2	1–2	33%
Win–loss	0–0	1–2	0–2	0–0	0–3	1–1	0–0	0–0	2–1	0–0	2–2	0 / 11	6–11	35%
ATP Masters Series
Miami	A	A	1R	A	2R	1R	A	A	Q1	1R	A	0 / 4	1–4	20%
Monte Carlo	A	A	A	A	A	A	A	Q1	A	A	A	0 / 0	0–0	–
Canada	A	A	A	A	1R	A	Q2	A	A	A	A	0 / 1	0–1	0%
Paris	A	A	A	A	A	A	Q1	A	A	A	A	0 / 0	0–0	–
Win–loss	0–0	0–0	0–1	0–0	1–2	0–1	0–0	0–0	0–0	0–1	0–0	0 / 5	1–5	17%

=== Doubles ===
Tournament	1988	1989	1990	1991	1992	1993	1994	1995	1996	1997	SR	W–L	Win %
Grand Slam tournaments
Australian Open	1R	2R	1R	A	A	A	A	A	A	A	0 / 3	1–3	25%
French Open	A	2R	A	A	A	A	A	A	A	A	0 / 1	1–1	50%
Wimbledon	A	1R	1R	A	Q2	Q1	A	Q2	A	1R	0 / 3	0–3	0%
US Open	A	A	A	A	A	A	A	A	A	Q1	0 / 0	0–0	–
Win–loss	0–1	2–3	0–2	0–0	0–0	0–0	0–0	0–0	0–0	0–1	0 / 7	2–7	22%
ATP Masters Series
Miami	A	1R	A	A	A	A	A	Q2	A	A	0 / 1	0–1	0%
Monte Carlo	A	A	A	A	A	A	A	A	A	Q1	0 / 0	0–0	–
Hamburg	1R	1R	A	A	A	A	A	A	A	A	0 / 2	0–2	0%
Win–loss	0–1	0–2	0–0	0–0	0–0	0–0	0–0	0–0	0–0	0–0	0 / 3	0–3	0%
