= Shlomo Glickstein =

Israeli tennis player (born 1958)

Shlomo Glickstein שלמה גליקשטיין
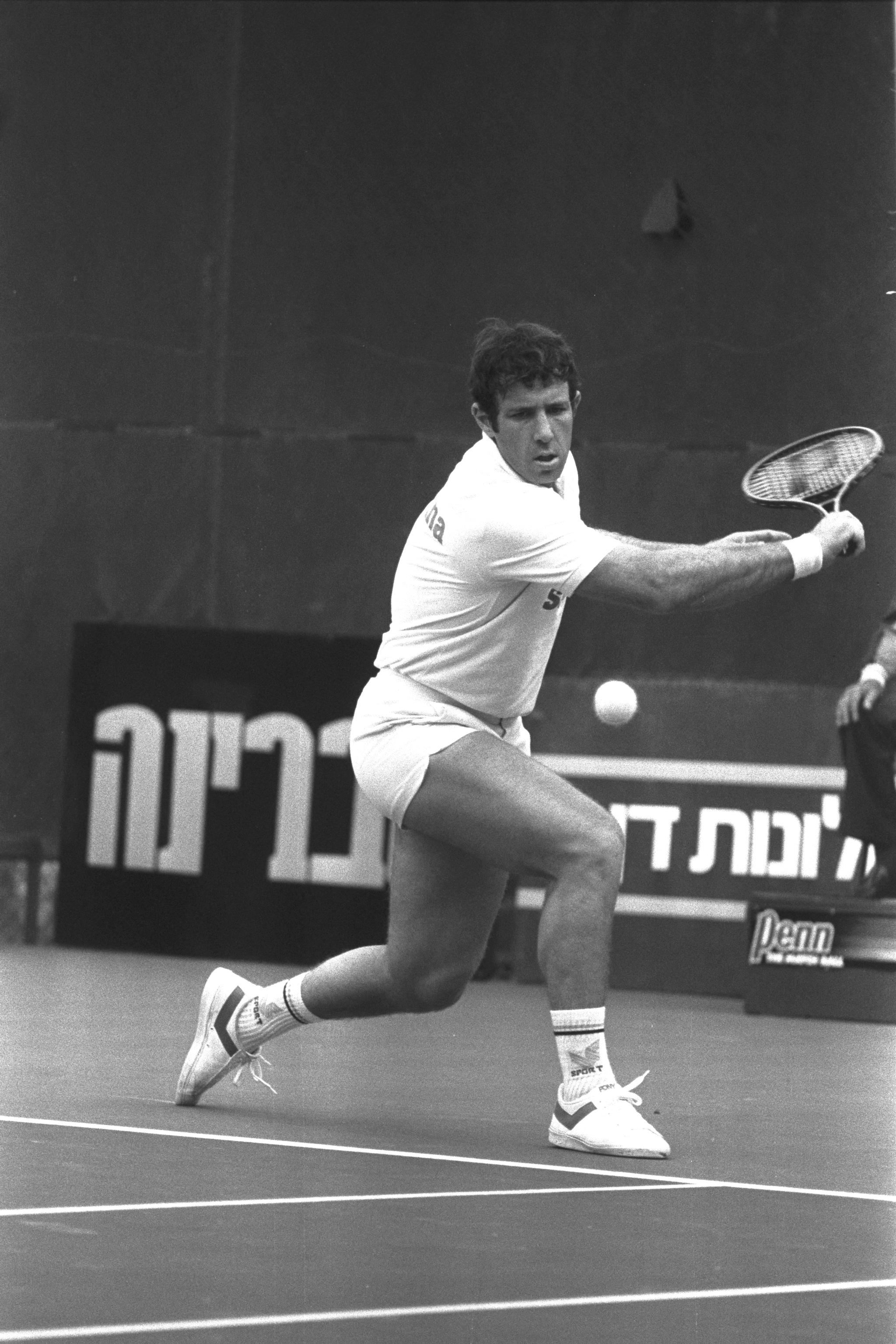
- Country (sports): Israel
- Residence: Ashkelon, Israel
- Born: 6 January 1958 (age 68) Rehovot, Israel
- Height: 1.88 m (6 ft 2 in)
- Plays: Right-handed (one-handed backhand)
- Prize money: $588,880

Singles
- Career record: 167–150
- Career titles: 2
- Highest ranking: No. 22 (8 November 1982)

Grand Slam singles results
- Australian Open: QF (1981)
- French Open: 3R (1983)
- Wimbledon: 3R (1985)
- US Open: 2R (1980, 1981, 1982, 1983)

Doubles
- Career record: 101–135
- Career titles: 0
- Highest ranking: No. 28 (3 February 1986)

Grand Slam doubles results
- Australian Open: 3R (1984)
- French Open: F (1985)
- US Open: 3R (1982)

Team competitions
- Davis Cup: QF (1987)
Medal record
Men's tennis
Representing Israel
Maccabiah Games
Gold medal – first place	1981 Israel	Men's Singles

Shlomo Glickstein (Hebrew: שלמה גליקשטיין, romanized: Glickshtein; born 6 January 1958) is an Israeli former professional tennis player.

He reached his career-high singles ranking of World No. 22 in November 1982, and his career-high doubles ranking of World No. 28 in February 1986.

== Early and personal life ==
Glickstein was born in Rehovot, Israel, lives in Ashkelon, Israel, and is Jewish. His parents immigrated to Israel from Poland. He served in the Israel Defense Forces for three years, from the ages of 18 to 21, rising to the rank of sergeant.

== Tennis career ==
In 1980, Glickstein defeated World No. 35 Raúl Ramírez in the first round at Wimbledon. He lost to Björn Borg (the eventual tournament winner) in the second round, but won the Wimbledon Plate in a consolation tournament.

Glickstein's victories include wins against World No. 1 Ivan Lendl 6–2, 3–6, 7–5; No. 9 Harold Solomon; No. 10 Eliot Teltscher; and No. 11 Brian Gottfried.

Glickstein retired in 1988. He served as director of the Israel Tennis Academy in Ramat Hasharon from 1992 to 1996.

In the spring of 1998 he was still managing the Israeli Davis Cup and Fed Cup teams.

=== Davis Cup ===
Glickstein was 44–22, and 22–4 on hard courts, in Davis Cup play from 1976 to 1987. He is Israel's all-time leader in total wins, singles wins (31), and doubles wins (13). As of 2008, his 44 wins was twice that of the Israeli with the second-most Davis Cup wins, Amos Mansdorf.

=== Maccabiah Games ===
At the 1981 Maccabiah Games, Glickstein had the honor of lighting the ceremonial flame at the opening ceremony. Glickstein then went on to win the gold medal in men's singles in tennis, the first Israeli to win a Maccabiah tennis championship.

=== Miscellaneous ===
Glickstein trained at Israel Tennis Centers.

== Grand Slam finals ==
=== Doubles (1 runner-up) ===
Result	Year	Championship	Surface	Partner	Opponents	Score
Loss	1985	French Open	Clay	(Sweden) Hans Simonsson	(Australia) Mark Edmondson (Australia) Kim Warwick	3–6, 4–6, 7–6^{(7–5)}, 3–6

== Career finals ==
=== Singles: 2 titles ===
Titles by surface
Hard (1–0)
Clay (1–0)
Grass (0–0)
Carpet (0–0)

Result	W-L	Date	Tournament	Surface	Opponent	Score
Win	1–0	Dec 1979	Australian Hard Court Championships	Hard	(United States) Robert Van't Hof	7–6, 6–4
Win	2–0	Jul 1981	South Orange Open, U.S.	Clay	(United States) Dick Stockton	6–3, 5–7, 6–4

== See also ==
- List of select Jewish tennis players
