= Amos Mansdorf =

Israeli tennis player (born 1965)

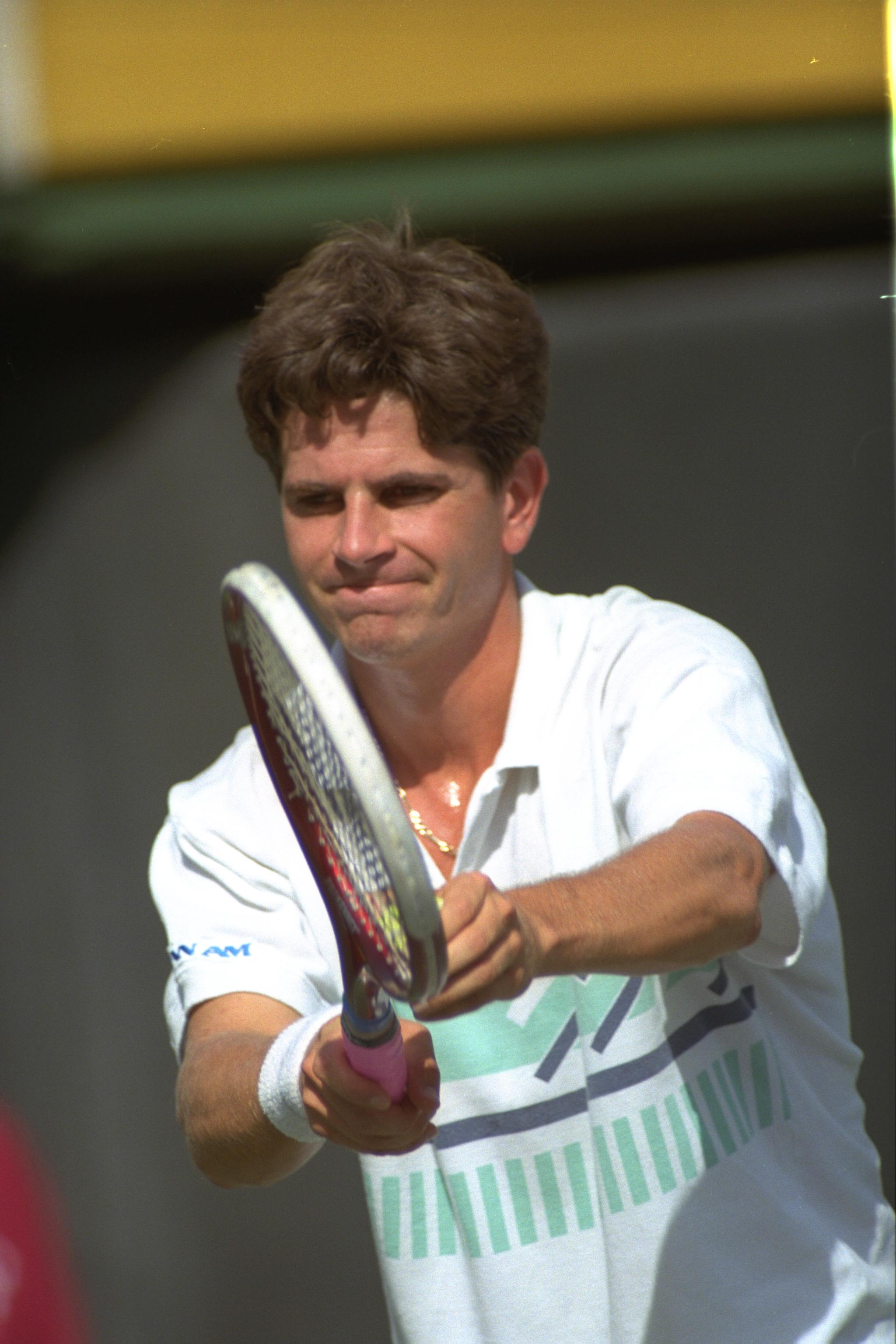
- Native name: עמוס מנסדורף
- Country (sports): Israel
- Born: 20 October 1965 (age 60) Tel Aviv, Israel
- Height: 1.75 m (5 ft 9 in)
- Turned pro: 1983
- Retired: 1994
- Plays: Right-handed (one-handed backhand)
- Prize money: $2,412,016

Singles
- Career record: 306–231
- Career titles: 6; 0 Challenger, 0 Futures
- Highest ranking: No. 18 (16 November 1987)

Grand Slam singles results
- Australian Open: QF (1992)
- French Open: 3R (1990)
- Wimbledon: 4R (1989)
- US Open: 4R (1990)

Other tournaments
- Olympic Games: 3R (1988)

Doubles
- Career record: 46–84
- Career titles: 0; 0 Challenger, 0 Futures
- Highest ranking: No. 67 (19 May 1986)

Grand Slam doubles results
- Australian Open: 3R (1985)
- French Open: 3R (1988)
- Wimbledon: 2R (1987)
- US Open: 1R (1986, 1987, 1988)

Team competitions
- Davis Cup: QF (1987)
- Last updated on: 24 May 2022.

Amos Mansdorf (Hebrew: עמוס מנסדורף; born 20 October 1965) is an Israeli former professional tennis player.

His career-high singles ranking was World No. 18 (achieved in November 1987), the highest ever for any male Israeli tennis player. His career-high doubles ranking was World No. 67 (May 1986).

== Early and personal life ==
Mansdorf grew up in Ramat HaSharon, a small city north of Tel Aviv, and is a Jew. All four of his grandparents had emigrated from Poland to Israel in the 1930s. His father Jacob is a chemical engineer, and his mother Era is a teacher. He started playing tennis when he was 10 years old. He trained at the Israel Tennis Centers. He lives in Herzlia, Israel.

== Tennis career ==
=== 1980s ===
In 1983 Mansdorf won the Asian Junior Championship in Hong Kong. That same year he turned professional, and started his mandatory Israeli military service. During his service he played at the demonstration event of the 1984 Summer Olympics in Los Angeles, and lost in the first round. He reached the quarterfinals at both the 1984 US Open and Canadian Open Juniors.

Immediately after completing his service, in November 1986 he beat World # 5 Henri Leconte 6–2, 6–7, 6–3, in Wembley, United Kingdom. He won his first tour singles title later that month at Johannesburg, beating World # 10 Andrés Gómez 6–4, 6–4 in the quarterfinals, and defeating American Matt Anger in the final.

His career-high singles ranking was World No. 18 (achieved in November 1987), the highest ever for any male Israeli tennis player. His second singles title came in 1987 in his hometown of Ramat Hasharon. In the semifinals he beat World # 6 Jimmy Connors, 7–6, 6–3, and in the finals he beat World # 12 Brad Gilbert, 3–6, 6–3, 6–4.

The third title was in January 1988 at Auckland. In March he beat World # 4 Boris Becker, 6–4, 6–4, in Orlando. In October that year he won the biggest title of his career at the Paris Open (now part of the Tennis Masters Series). He faced the World # 1 Mats Wilander, but the Swede retired before the tournament began. Mansdorf beat Aaron Krickstein and Jakob Hlasek, two top 10 players, on his way to the final. He beat Gilbert in the final in straight sets, 6–3, 6–2, 6–3.

He also played at the 1988 Olympics in Seoul, where tennis was an official sport, and this time reached the 3rd round (the final 16 players) defeating Yoo Jin-sun and Kelly Evernden before losing to Tim Mayotte. In March 1989 in Scottsdale he upset World # 13 Thomas Muster, 7–5, 6–2, and World # 15 Gilbert 5–7, 6–3, 6–0.

=== 1990s ===
Mansdorf won another title at Rosmalen in the Netherlands in 1990. In the third round of the US Open in 1990 he beat World # 8 Brad Gilbert 5–7, 5–7, 6–3, 7–6, 6–1. In September 1991 in Toulouse, he beat World # 11 Magnus Gustafsson, 6–4, 6–1.

His best performance at a Grand Slam tournament came at the Australian Open in 1992, where he reached the quarterfinals by beating Peter Lundgren, Arnaud Boetsch, Richey Reneberg and Aaron Krickstein before losing to the eventual champion, Jim Courier. In February 1992 in Philadelphia, he upset World # 3 Michael Stich 7–6 (5), 7–5. In January 1993 in Sydney, he beat World # 13 Carlos Costa 6–1, 5–7, 6–4. He qualified for the 1992 Olympics, but had to withdraw because of injury.

Mansdorf's sixth and final career title came in 1993 at Washington, DC, during which he beat World # 11 Petr Korda 6–3, 6–3. In July 1994 in Toronto, he beat World # 8 Todd Martin 6–7 (4), 6–3, retired, and in August at Cincinnati he upset Korda (World # 14) 6–3, 6–3, and Boris Becker (World # 8), 7–6 (1), 6–4.

He reached the fourth round of the US Open and Wimbledon and the finals of the US Pro Indoor Championships.

In addition to his six titles, he reached ten other finals but lost, four of them in Ramat Hasharon. During his career, he won 304 matches and lost 231, and earned prize money of US$2,412,691.

=== Davis Cup ===
In Davis Cup, Mansdorf played 10 years and won 22 matches (second-most ever by an Israeli, to Shlomo Glickstein, through 2008) against 25 losses, including a 15–4 record in singles matches on hard courts or carpet. He played a major role in Israel's success in this competition, when Israel played six years in the world group between 1987 and 1994.

=== Retirement ===
Mansdorf retired in 1994. Mansdorf next worked as a diamond merchant in Ramat Aviv. He serves as chairman of the Israel Tennis Center, and works in the Israel Tennis Association's youth program.

Between 2000 and 2004, he served as Israel's Davis Cup captain.

As of 2015, he was coaching 17-year-old Israeli Davis Cup player Edan Leshem.

== ATP career finals ==
=== Singles: 16 (6 titles, 10 runner-ups) ===
Legend Grand Slam Tournaments (0–0) ATP World Tour Finals (0–0) ATP Masters 1000 Series (1–0) ATP 500 Series (1–1) ATP 250 Series (4–9)	Finals by surface Hard (4–9) Clay (0–0) Grass (1–0) Carpet (1–1)	Finals by setting Outdoors (4–7) Indoors (2–3)

Result	W–L	Date	Tournament	Tier	Surface	Opponent	Score
Loss	0–1	Oct 1985	Tel Aviv, Israel	Grand Prix	Hard	(United States) Brad Gilbert	3–6, 2–6
Win	1–1	Nov 1986	Johannesburg, South Africa	Grand Prix	Hard	(United States) Matt Anger	6–3, 3–6, 6–2, 7–5
Win	2–1	Oct 1987	Tel Aviv, Israel	Grand Prix	Hard	(United States) Brad Gilbert	3–6, 6–3, 6–4
Loss	2–2	Oct 1987	Vienna, Austria	Grand Prix	Hard	(Sweden) Jonas Svensson	6–1, 6–1, 2–6, 3–6, 5–7
Win	3–2	Jan 1988	Auckland, New Zealand	Grand Prix	Hard	(India) Ramesh Krishnan	6–3, 6–4
Win	4–2	Oct 1988	Paris, France	Masters Series	Carpet	(United States) Brad Gilbert	6–3, 6–2, 6–3
Loss	4–3	Jan 1989	Auckland, New Zealand	Grand Prix	Hard	(India) Ramesh Krishnan	4–6, 0–6
Loss	4–4	Apr 1989	Singapore, Singapore	Grand Prix	Hard	(United States) Kelly Jones	1–6, 5–7
Win	5–4	Jun 1990	Rosmalen, Netherlands	Grand Prix	Grass	(Soviet Union) Alexander Volkov	6–3, 7–6
Loss	5–5	Oct 1990	Tel Aviv, Israel	Grand Prix	Hard	(Soviet Union) Andrei Chesnokov	4–6, 3–6
Loss	5–6	Oct 1991	Toulouse, France	World Series	Hard	(France) Guy Forget	2–6, 6–7^{(4–7)}
Loss	5–7	Feb 1992	Philadelphia, United States	Championship Series	Carpet	(United States) Pete Sampras	1–6, 6–7^{(4–7)}, 6–2, 6–7^{(2–7)}
Loss	5–8	Apr 1993	Osaka, Japan	World Series	Hard	(United States) Michael Chang	4–6, 4–6
Win	6–8	Jul 1993	Washington, United States	Championship Series	Hard	(United States) Todd Martin	7–6^{(7–3)}, 7–5
Loss	6–9	Oct 1993	Tel Aviv, Israel	World Series	Hard	(Italy) Stefano Pescosolido	6–7^{(5–7)}, 5–7
Loss	6–10	Oct 1994	Tel Aviv, Israel	World Series	Hard	(South Africa) Wayne Ferreira	6–7^{(4–7)}, 3–6

=== Doubles: 1 (1 runner-up) ===
Legend Grand Slam Tournaments (0–0) ATP World Tour Finals (0–0) ATP Masters 1000 Series (0–0) ATP 500 Series (0–0) ATP 250 Series (0–1)	Finals by surface Hard (0–1) Clay (0–0) Grass (0–0) Carpet (0–0)	Finals by setting Outdoors (0–1) Indoors (0–0)

Result	W–L	Date	Tournament	Tier	Surface	Partner	Opponents	Score
Loss	0–1	Nov 1986	Johannesburg, South Africa	Grand Prix	Hard	(Israel) Shahar Perkiss	(United Kingdom) Colin Dowdeswell (South Africa) Christo Van Rensburg	6–3, 6–7, 4–6

== Performance timelines ==
Key
W	F	SF	QF	#R	RR	Q#	DNQ	A	NH

(W) winner; (F) finalist; (SF) semifinalist; (QF) quarterfinalist; (#R) rounds 4, 3, 2, 1; (RR) round-robin stage; (Q#) qualification round; (DNQ) did not qualify; (A) absent; (NH) not held; (SR) strike rate (events won / competed); (W–L) win–loss record.

=== Singles ===
Tournament	1984	1985	1986	1987	1988	1989	1990	1991	1992	1993	1994	SR	W–L	Win %
Grand Slam tournaments
Australian Open	A	2R	A	2R	1R	4R	1R	2R	QF	3R	2R	0 / 9	12–9	57%
French Open	A	A	2R	1R	1R	A	3R	A	1R	A	1R	0 / 6	3–6	33%
Wimbledon	Q1	Q3	3R	2R	2R	4R	3R	1R	2R	2R	3R	0 / 9	13–9	59%
US Open	A	2R	3R	3R	1R	3R	4R	1R	1R	3R	2R	0 / 10	13–10	57%
Win–loss	0–0	2–2	5–3	3–4	1–4	8–3	7–4	1–3	5–4	5–3	4–4	0 / 34	41–34	55%
Olympic Games
Summer Olympics	1R	Not Held			3R	Not Held			A	NH		0 / 2	2–2	50%
ATP Tour Masters 1000
Indian Wells	A	A	A	1R	QF	2R	A	A	1R	A	A	0 / 4	4–4	50%
Miami	A	A	1R	3R	4R	A	3R	A	2R	A	A	0 / 5	7–5	58%
Hamburg	A	A	A	A	A	A	1R	1R	A	A	1R	0 / 3	0–3	0%
Rome	A	A	A	A	A	A	1R	1R	2R	1R	1R	0 / 5	1–5	17%
Canada	A	A	2R	A	1R	A	3R	3R	QF	1R	3R	0 / 7	9–7	56%
Cincinnati	A	1R	1R	1R	A	A	2R	3R	3R	2R	QF	0 / 8	9–8	53%
Paris	A	A	A	QF	W	1R	2R	A	2R	2R	A	1 / 6	10–5	67%
Win–loss	0–0	0–1	1–3	4–4	11–3	1–2	6–6	4–4	6–6	2–4	5–4	1 / 38	40–37	52%

=== Doubles ===
Tournament	1984	1985	1986	1987	1988	1989	1990	SR	W–L	Win %
Grand Slam tournaments
Australian Open	A	3R	A	2R	1R	1R	1R	0 / 5	3–5	38%
French Open	A	A	1R	A	3R	A	A	0 / 2	2–2	50%
Wimbledon	1R	Q2	1R	2R	A	A	A	0 / 3	1–3	25%
US Open	A	A	1R	1R	1R	A	A	0 / 3	0–3	0%
Win–loss	0–1	2–1	0–3	2–3	2–3	0–1	0–1	0 / 13	6–13	32%
Olympic Games
Summer Olympics	A	Not Held			2R	NH		0 / 1	1–1	50%
ATP Tour Masters 1000
Indian Wells	A	A	A	A	1R	1R	A	0 / 2	0–2	0%
Miami	A	A	1R	1R	3R	A	A	0 / 3	2–3	40%
Rome	A	A	2R	A	A	A	A	0 / 1	1–1	50%
Canada	A	A	1R	A	A	A	A	0 / 1	0–1	0%
Cincinnati	A	A	2R	2R	A	A	A	0 / 2	0–2	0%
Win–loss	0–0	0–0	1–4	0–2	2–2	0–1	0–0	0 / 9	3–9	25%

== See also ==
- List of select Jewish tennis players
