= Shahar Perkiss =

Israeli tennis player

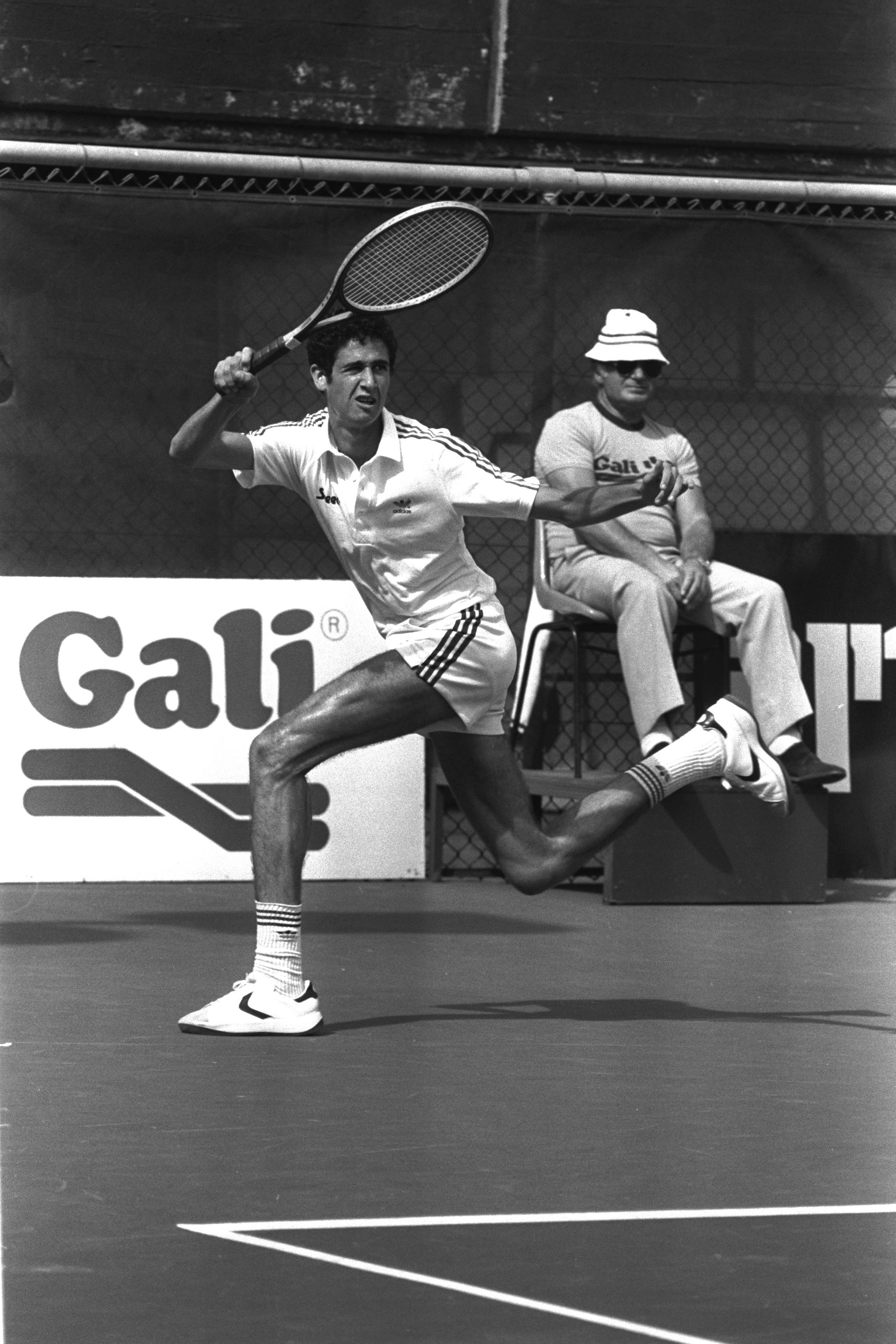
- Native name: שחר פרקיס
- Country (sports): Israel
- Born: 14 October 1962 (age 64) Haifa, Israel
- Height: 1.93 m (6 ft 4 in)
- Plays: Right-handed
- Prize money: $206,224

Singles
- Career record: 49–55
- Career titles: 0
- Highest ranking: No. 53 (5 March 1985)

Grand Slam singles results
- Australian Open: 2R (1984, 1985)
- French Open: 1R (1986)
- Wimbledon: 2R (1984)
- US Open: 3R (1984)

Doubles
- Career record: 41–46
- Career titles: 1
- Highest ranking: No. 54 (11 November 1985)
Medal record
Maccabiah Games
Gold medal – first place	1989 Israel	Men's Doubles
Silver medal – second place	1989 Israel	Men's Singles

Shahar Perkiss (Hebrew: שחר פרקיס; born 14 October 1962) is an Israeli right-handed former professional tennis player. He reached his best singles ranking of world # 53 in March 1985. He peaked at world # 54 in the doubles rankings in November 1985. Perkiss won the silver medal in singles in tennis at the 1989 Maccabiah Games, and won the gold medal in doubles playing alongside Boaz Merenstein.

== Early life ==
Perkiss was born in Haifa, Israel, and is Jewish.

== Tennis career ==
A year after first picking up a tennis racket, Perkiss ranked No. 1 in Israel in the age 10 and under ranks. Perkiss trained at Israel Tennis Centers.

He reached his highest singles ATP ranking on 4 March 1985, when he became the # 53 player in the world.

In 1982 in Houston he reeled off three upsets in a row, beating world No. 27 Ramesh Krishnan, No. 37 Terry Moor, and No. 36 Mark Dickson. In August 1984 he defeated world No. 9 Aaron Krickstein in straight sets in Cincinnati. In 1986 he beat world # 10 Thierry Tulasne of France, 6–7, 6–2 6–4, in Kitzbuhel, Austria. In 1987, he and Gilad Bloom won the ATP doubles title in Tel Aviv.

=== Davis Cup ===
He played 31 Davis Cup matches for Israel between 1981 and 1992, winning 18 of them, including 11 of 13 on hard courts.

=== Olympics ===
He represented Israel as a qualifier at the 1988 Summer Olympics in Seoul. There, he was defeated in the first round by Javier Frana from Argentina.

=== Maccabiah Games ===
Perkiss won the silver medal in singles in tennis at the 1989 Maccabiah Games, as he lost in the finals to South Africa's Howard Joffe, part of the ROW (Rest of the World) team due to country sanctions, but won the gold medal in doubles playing alongside Boaz Merenstein.

=== Israel Tennis Association ===
In 2005, he became the CEO of the Israel Tennis Association.

== Career finals ==
Legend
Grand Slam
Tennis Masters Cup
ATP Masters Series
ATP Tour

=== Singles (1 runner-up) ===
Result	W-L	Date	Tournament	Surface	Opponent	Score
Loss	0–1	Sep 1984	Tel Aviv, Israel	Hard	(United States) Aaron Krickstein	4–6, 1–6

=== Doubles (1 title, 2 runner-ups) ===
Result	W-L	Date	Tournament	Surface	Partner	Opponents	Score
Loss	0–1	Apr 1985	Monte Carlo, Monaco	Clay	(Israel) Shlomo Glickstein	(Czechoslovakia) Pavel Složil (Czechoslovakia) Tomáš Šmíd	2–6, 3–6
Loss	0–2	Oct 1985	Johannesburg, South Africa	Hard	(Israel) Amos Mansdorf	(United Kingdom) Colin Dowdeswell (South Africa) Christo van Rensburg	6–3, 6–7^{(5–7)}, 4–6
Win	1–2	Oct 1987	Tel Aviv, Israel	Hard	(Israel) Gilad Bloom	(Netherlands) Huub van Boeckel (West Germany) Wolfgang Popp	6–2, 6–4

== See also ==
- List of select Jewish tennis players
