= Tel Aviv Open =

Defunct tennis tournament
- Sponsor: Watergen
- Founded: 1978; 48 years ago
- Location: Tel Aviv; Israel
- Venue: Expo Tel Aviv (2022-current); Israel Tennis Centers (1978-1999)
- Category: ATP Tour 250 (2022–current); ATP Challenger Series (1978, 1998-1999); ATP World Series (1990–96); Grand Prix circuit (1979-81, 1983-89)
- Surface: Hard / Indoors (2022-current); Hard / Outdoors (1978-1999)
- Draw: 28S/28Q/16D
- Prize money: $949,475 (2022)
- Website: atptour.com

Current champions (2022)
- Singles: (Serbia) Novak Djokovic
- Doubles: (India) Rohan Bopanna / (Netherlands) Matwé Middelkoop

The Tel Aviv Open (also known as the Tel Aviv Watergen Open due to sponsorship reasons) is an ATP Tour-affiliated tennis tournament. It was first played from 1978 through 1999 (skipping 1982 due to the 1982 Lebanon War and 1997 as it transitioned back to the Challenger Series) and was to be resumed in 2014 as a replacement for the St. Petersburg Open, however its return was cancelled due to security concerns arising from the 2014 Gaza War and scrapped permanently in 2015. On June 21, 2022, it was announced that the tournament would return later that year, albeit in a different venue than previous editions. The tournament was planned to continue in 2023, but was cancelled due to the Gaza war.

Israeli tennis player Amos Mansdorf appeared in the final five times, winning in 1987, making him the only Israeli to win the event. Jimmy Connors won his final career singles title at the event in 1989.

In 1990 and 1991 the tournament was known as the Riklis Classic and in 1996 it was known as the Eisenberg Israel Open.

The tournament still holds the ATP record for the youngest winner of an ATP event (Aaron Krickstein in 1983, at the age of 16 and 2 months).

== Finals ==
=== Singles ===
| Year | Champions | Runners-up | Score |
|---|---|---|---|
↓ ATP Challenger Series event ↓
| 1978 | (Netherlands) Tom Okker | (Austria) Peter Feigl | 6-7, 6-4, 6-2 |
↓ Grand Prix event ↓
| 1979 | (Netherlands) Tom Okker | (Sweden) Per Hjertquist | 6–4, 6–3 |
| 1980 | (United States) Harold Solomon | (Israel) Shlomo Glickstein | 6–2, 6–3 |
| 1981 | (United States) Mel Purcell | (Sweden) Per Hjertquist | 6–1, 6–1 |
| 1982 | Not held due to the 1982 Lebanon War | | |
| 1983 | (United States) Aaron Krickstein | (West Germany) Christoph Zipf | 7–6, 6–3 |
| 1984 | (United States) Aaron Krickstein | (Israel) Shahar Perkiss | 6–4, 6–1 |
| 1985 | (United States) Brad Gilbert | (Israel) Amos Mansdorf | 6–3, 6–2 |
| 1986 | (United States) Brad Gilbert | (United States) Aaron Krickstein | 7–5, 6–2 |
| 1987 | (Israel) Amos Mansdorf | (United States) Brad Gilbert | 3–6, 6–3, 6–4 |
| 1988 | (United States) Brad Gilbert | (United States) Aaron Krickstein | 4–6, 7–6, 6–2 |
| 1989 | (United States) Jimmy Connors | (Israel) Gilad Bloom | 2–6, 6–2, 6–1 |
↓ ATP World Series event ↓
| 1990 | (Soviet Union) Andrei Chesnokov | (Israel) Amos Mansdorf | 6–4, 6–3 |
| 1991 | (Mexico) Leonardo Lavalle | (South Africa) Christo van Rensburg | 6–2, 3–6, 6–3 |
| 1992 | (United States) Jeff Tarango | (France) Stephane Simian | 4–6, 6–3, 6–4 |
| 1993 | (Italy) Stefano Pescosolido | (Israel) Amos Mansdorf | 7–6, 7–5 |
| 1994 | (South Africa) Wayne Ferreira | (Israel) Amos Mansdorf | 7–6, 6–3 |
| 1995 | (Slovakia) Ján Krošlák | (Spain) Javier Sánchez | 6–3, 6–4 |
| 1996 | (Spain) Javier Sánchez | (South Africa) Marcos Ondruska | 6–4, 7–5 |
| 1997 | Not held | | |
↓ ATP Challenger Series event ↓
| 1998 | (Italy) Gianluca Pozzi | (Israel) Lior Mor | 6–1, 6–7, 6–3 |
| 1999 | (Czech Republic) Ctislav Doseděl | (Israel) Noam Okun | 7–6, 6–3 |
| 2000–2021 | Not held; return cancelled due to 2014 Gaza War | | |
↓ ATP Tour 250 event ↓
| 2022 | (Serbia) Novak Djokovic | (Croatia) Marin Čilić | 6–3, 6–4 |
| 2023 | Not held due to Gaza war | | |

=== Doubles ===
| Year | Champions | Runners-up | Score |
|---|---|---|---|
↓ ATP Challenger Series event ↓
| 1978 | (Austria) Peter Feigl (United States) Eric Friedler | (United States) Mike Fishbach (Netherlands) Tom Okker | 6-3, 6-7, 6-3 |
↓ Grand Prix event ↓
| 1979 | (Romania) Ilie Năstase (Netherlands) Tom Okker | (United States) Mike Cahill (Australia) Colin Dibley | 7–5, 6–4 |
| 1980 | (Sweden) Per Hjertquist (Israel) Steve Krulevitz | (United States) Eric Fromm (United States) Cary Leeds | 7–6, 6–3 |
| 1981 | (United States) Steve Meister (United States) Van Winitsky | (United Kingdom) John Feaver (United States) Steve Krulevitz | 3–6, 6–3, 6–3 |
| 1982 | Not held due to the 1982 Lebanon War | | |
| 1983 | (United Kingdom) Colin Dowdeswell (Hungary) Zoltán Kuhárszky | (West Germany) Peter Elter (Austria) Peter Feigl | 6–3, 7–5 |
| 1984 | (Australia) Peter Doohan (South Africa) Brian Levine | (United Kingdom) Colin Dowdeswell (Switzerland) Jakob Hlasek | 6–3, 6–4 |
| 1985 | (United States) Brad Gilbert (Romania) Ilie Năstase | (South Africa) Michael Robertson (Romania) Florin Segărceanu | 6–3, 6–2 |
| 1986 | (United States) John Letts (Sweden) Peter Lundgren | (South Africa) Christo Steyn (South Africa) Danie Visser | 6–3, 3–6, 6–3 |
| 1987 | (Israel) Gilad Bloom (Israel) Shahar Perkiss | (West Germany) Wolfgang Popp (Netherlands) Huub van Boeckel | 6–2, 6–4 |
| 1988 | (The Bahamas) Roger Smith (Kenya) Paul Wekesa | (West Germany) Patrick Baur (West Germany) Alexander Mronz | 6–3, 6–3 |
| 1989 | (United Kingdom) Jeremy Bates (West Germany) Patrick Baur | (Sweden) Rikard Bergh (Sweden) Per Henricsson | 6–1, 4–6, 6–1 |
↓ ATP World Series event ↓
| 1990 | (Nigeria) Nduka Odizor (South Africa) Christo van Rensburg | (Sweden) Ronnie Båthman (Sweden) Rikard Bergh | 6–3, 6–4 |
| 1991 | (Czechoslovakia) David Rikl (Netherlands) Michiel Schapers | (Argentina) Javier Frana (Mexico) Leonardo Lavalle | 6–2, 6–7, 6–3 |
| 1992 | (United States) Mike Bauer (Portugal) João Cunha Silva | (Netherlands) Mark Koevermans (Sweden) Tobias Svantesson | 6–3, 6–4 |
| 1993 | (Spain) Sergio Casal (Spain) Emilio Sánchez | (United States) Mike Bauer (Czech Republic) David Rikl | 6–4, 6–4 |
| 1994 | (South Africa) Lan Bale (South Africa) John-Laffnie de Jager | (Sweden) Jan Apell (Sweden) Jonas Björkman | 6–7, 6–2, 7–6 |
| 1995 | (United States) Jim Grabb (United States) Jared Palmer | (United States) Kent Kinnear (United States) David Wheaton | 6–4, 7–5 |
| 1996 | (South Africa) Marcos Ondruska (South Africa) Grant Stafford | (Israel) Noam Behr (Israel) Eyal Erlich | 6–3, 6–2 |
| 1997 | Not held | | |
↓ ATP Challenger Series event ↓
| 1998 | (Czech Republic) Radek Štěpánek (Czech Republic) Michal Tabara | (Israel) Noam Okun (Israel) Nir Welgreen | 7–6, 6–3 |
| 1999 | (Israel) Noam Behr (Israel) Eyal Ran | (Israel) Amir Hadad (Australia) Andrew Ilie | 6–3, 6–2 |
| 2000–2021 | Not held; return cancelled due to 2014 Gaza War | | |
↓ ATP Tour 250 event ↓
| 2022 | (India) Rohan Bopanna (Netherlands) Matwé Middelkoop | (Mexico) Santiago González (Argentina) Andrés Molteni | 6–2, 6–4 |
| 2023 | Not held due to Gaza war | | |
