= Gilad Bloom =

Israeli tennis player (born 1967)

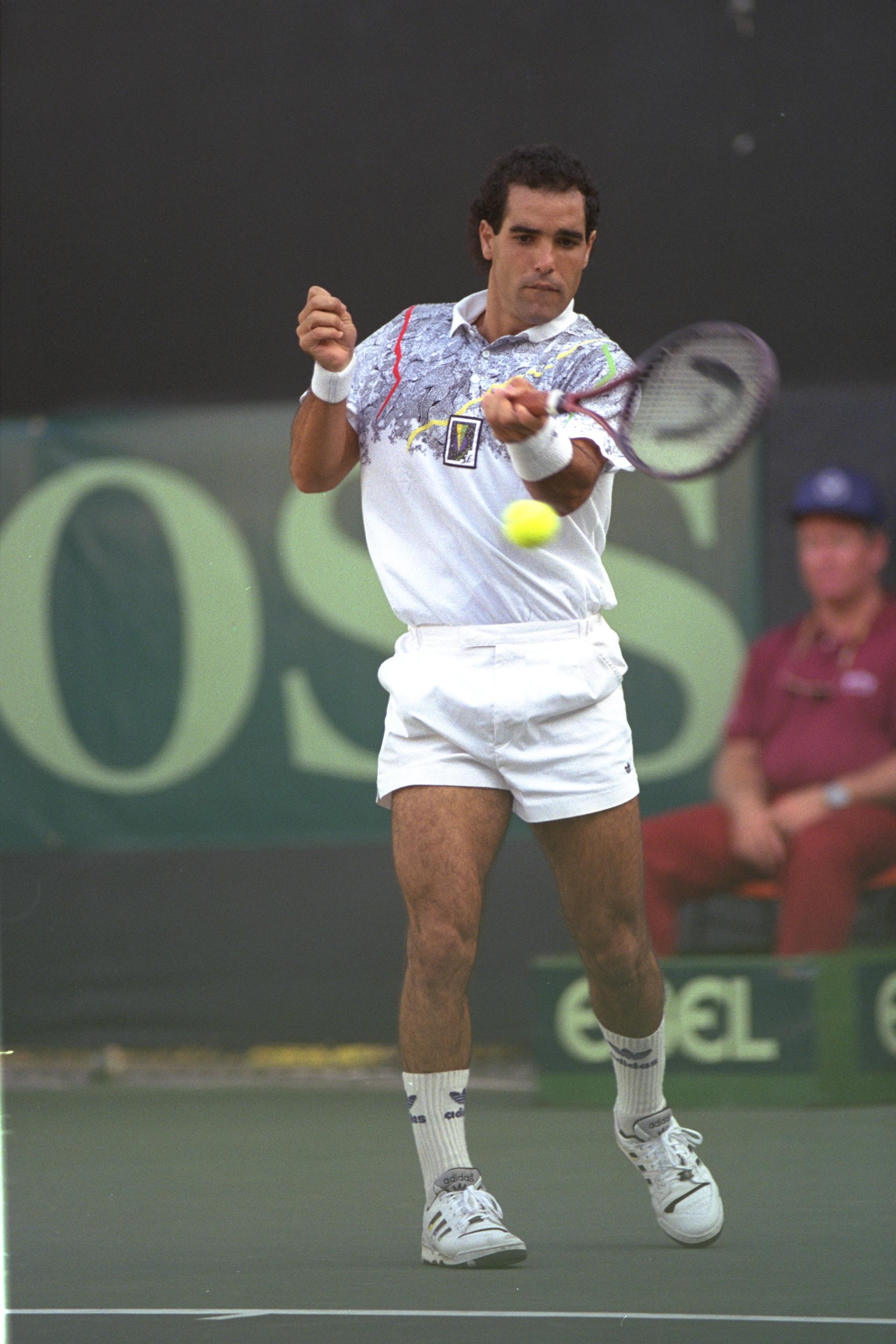
- Country (sports): Israel
- Residence: Ramat HaSharon
- Born: 1 March 1967 (age 59) Tel Aviv, Israel
- Height: 1.73 m (5 ft 8 in)
- Turned pro: 1986
- Retired: 1995
- Plays: Left-handed (one-handed backhand)
- Prize money: $694,271

Singles
- Career record: 93–122
- Career titles: 0
- Highest ranking: No. 61 (15 October 1990)

Grand Slam singles results
- Australian Open: 3R (1990)
- French Open: 2R (1990, 1992)
- Wimbledon: 3R (1987)
- US Open: 4R (1990)

Doubles
- Career record: 57–78
- Career titles: 4
- Highest ranking: No. 62 (24 February 1992)

Grand Slam doubles results
- Australian Open: QF (1992)
- French Open: 2R (1987, 1991)
- Wimbledon: 2R (1987)
- US Open: 2R (1989)

Gilad Bloom (Hebrew: גלעד בלום; born 1 March 1967) is a former professional tennis player from Israel. Bloom trained at the Israel Tennis Centers. His career-high rankings were World No. 61 in singles (in 1990) and World No. 62 in doubles (in 1992).

== Personal life ==
Bloom grew up in Ramat HaSharon, is Jewish, and is married to Michal Bareket-Bloom. He has 4 sons, Guy Tyler Bloom, from a previous marriage, Jonathan Yehuda Bloom, Shy Dylan Bloom and Doron Hendrix Bloom (from his second marriage). He is known as a fan of the Hapoel Tel Aviv soccer team. Bloom has a rock band (The Gilad Bloom Band), the band plays shows in Manhattan Bars regularly since 2009, Bloom's band performs original songs written and composed by himself, and Bloom sings and plays guitar on the band.

== Tennis career ==
Bloom was Israel's junior champion, three-time men's singles champion, and two-time men's doubles champion. Bloom came in second in the boy's under-12 final at the annual Ericsson Orange Bowl International Tennis Championships in 1979.

Bloom turned professional in 1983 and played on the ATP tour for 13 years. During his career he won four tour doubles titles (at Tel Aviv and São Paulo in 1987, and at Seoul and Umag in 1991). He also finished runner-up in three top-level singles events (Tel Aviv in 1989, Manchester in 1990, and Singapore in 1991).

Bloom played Davis Cup for Israel from 1984 to 1995. He helped Israel qualify to the 1994 Davis Cup World Group, winning the qualification playoff's fifth and deciding rubber against Switzerland's Jakob Hlasek in one of the more memorable matches in Israeli tennis history.

His best singles performance at a Grand Slam was at the 1990 US Open, where he reached the fourth round, losing to Ivan Lendl.

Bloom represented Israel at the 1988 and 1992 Olympic tennis tournaments.

He retired from the professional tour in 1995.

== Career finals ==
Legend
Grand Slam
Tennis Masters Cup
ATP Masters Series
ATP Tour

=== Singles (3 runners-up) ===
Result	W-L	Date	Tournament	Surface	Opponent	Score
Loss	0–1	Oct 1989	Tel Aviv Open, Israel	Hard	(United States) Jimmy Connors	6–2, 2–6, 1–6
Loss	0–2	Jun 1990	Manchester Open, UK	Grass	(United States) Pete Sampras	6–7^{(9–11)}, 6–7^{(3–7)}
Loss	0–3	Apr 1991	Singapore Open, Singapore	Hard	(Netherlands) Jan Siemerink	4–6, 3–6

=== Doubles (4 titles, 1 runner-up) ===
Result	W-L	Date	Tournament	Surface	Partner	Opponents	Score
Win	1–0	Oct 1987	Tel Aviv Open, Israel	Hard	(Israel) Shahar Perkiss	(Netherlands) Huub van Boeckel (West Germany) Wolfgang Popp	6–2, 6–4
Win	2–0	Nov 1987	São Paulo, Brazil	Hard	(Spain) Javier Sánchez	(Spain) Tomás Carbonell (Spain) Sergio Casal	6–3, 6–7, 6–4
Loss	2–1	Jan 1990	Auckland, New Zealand	Hard	(Netherlands) Paul Haarhuis	(United States) Kelly Jones (United States) Robert Van't Hof	6–7, 0–6
Win	3–1	Apr 1991	Seoul Open, Korea	Hard	(Austria) Alex Antonitsch	(United States) Kent Kinnear (United States) Sven Salumaa	7–6, 6–1
Win	4–1	May 1991	Umag, Croatia	Clay	(Spain) Javier Sánchez	(United States) Richey Reneberg (United States) David Wheaton	7–6, 2–6, 6–1

== Coaching career ==
Since retiring from the tour, Bloom has played in seniors events and worked as a tennis coach and Director of Tennis.

In 1995 he was senior coach with the Israel Tennis Centers, coaching the country's top juniors among them Dudi Sela.

Since moving to NYC in 2000 Bloom had his own tennis program (Gilad Bloom Tennis) for 9 years and was also the first Director of Tennis at The John McEnroe Tennis Academy in Randall's Island, NY (2010–12). After leaving the McEnroe Academy, Bloom worked as the Executive Director of Tennis at TCR (The Club of Riverdale) in Riverdale, NY (2012–15). Bloom is currently back to running his own tennis program (Gilad Bloom Tennis) in NYC.

== See also ==
- List of select Jewish tennis players
