= 1985 Tel Aviv Open – Doubles =

Doubles
- 1985 Tel Aviv Open

Final
- Champions: (United States) Brad Gilbert (Romania) Ilie Năstase
- Runners-up: (South Africa) Michael Robertson (Romania) Florin Segărceanu
- Score: 6–3, 6–2

Events
Singles	Doubles
← 1984 ·	Tel Aviv Open	· 1986 →

Peter Doohan and Brian Levine were the defending champions, but did not participate this year.

Brad Gilbert and Ilie Năstase won the title, defeating Michael Robertson and Florin Segărceanu 6–3, 6–2 in the final.

== Seeds ==
1. (Israel) Shlomo Glickstein / (Israel) Shahar Perkiss (semifinals)
2. (United States) Tracy Delatte / (United States) Mike De Palmer (first round)
3. (United States) Brad Gilbert / (Romania) Ilie Năstase (champions)
4. (South Africa) Christo Steyn / (South Africa) Danie Visser (semifinals)

== Draw ==
=== Key ===
- Q = Qualifier
- WC = Wild card
- LL = Lucky loser
- Alt = Alternate
- SE = Special exempt
- PR = Protected ranking
- ITF = ITF entry
- JE = Junior exempt
- w/o = Walkover
- r = Retired
- d = Defaulted
- SR = Special ranking

=== Draw ===
First round
1	(Israel) S Glickstein (Israel) S Perkiss	6	7
(United States) M Flur (United States) J Lapidus	3	5
(Israel) G Bloom (Israel) A Naor	3	4
(Argentina) M Jaite (Israel) A Mansdorf	6	6
3	(United States) B Gilbert (Romania) I Năstase	3	6	6
(Austria) B Pils (West Germany) Karsten Schulz	6	2	1
(United Kingdom) D Felgate (United Kingdom) S Shaw	7	3	6
(West Germany) P Elter (South Africa) K Moir	6	6	7
(Sweden) S Eriksson (Sweden) P Carlsson	3	5
(India) V Amritraj (United States) B Green	6	7
(Spain) JA Rodríguez (Spain) Ricardo Sánchez-Rueda	4	4
4	(South Africa) C Steyn (South Africa) D Visser	6	6
(Italy) G Ocleppo (Finland) L Palin	6	3
(United States) M Doyle (West Germany) U Riglewski	7	6
(South Africa) M Robertson (Romania) F Segărceanu	6	7
2	(Republic of Ireland) T Delatte (United States) M De Palmer	3	5

Quarterfinals
1	(Israel) S Glickstein (Israel) S Perkiss	3	6	6
(Argentina) M Jaite (Israel) A Mansdorf	6	1	1
3	(United States) B Gilbert (Romania) I Năstase	7	6
(West Germany) P Elter (South Africa) K Moir	6	4
(India) V Amritraj (United States) B Green	3	4
4	(South Africa) C Steyn (South Africa) D Visser	6	6
(Republic of Ireland) M Doyle (West Germany) U Riglewski	7	5	2
(South Africa) M Robertson (Romania) F Segărceanu	6	7	6

Semifinals
1	(Israel) S Glickstein (Israel) S Perkiss	5	3
3	(United States) B Gilbert (Romania) I Năstase	7	6
4	(South Africa) C Steyn (South Africa) D Visser	7	6	5
(South Africa) M Robertson (Romania) F Segărceanu	6	7	7

Final
3	(United States) B Gilbert (Romania) I Năstase	6	6
(South Africa) M Robertson (Romania) F Segărceanu	3	2
