= 1986 Geneva Open – Doubles =

Doubles
- 1986 Geneva Open

Final
- Champions: (West Germany) Andreas Maurer (Sweden) Jörgen Windahl
- Runners-up: (Argentina) Gustavo Luza (Argentina) Gustavo Tiberti
- Score: 6–4, 3–6, 6–4

Events
Singles	Doubles
← 1985 ·	Geneva Open	· 1987 →

Sergio Casal and Emilio Sánchez were the defending champions, but did not participate this year.

Andreas Maurer and Jörgen Windahl won the title, defeating Gustavo Luza and Gustavo Tiberti 6–4, 3–6, 6–4 in the final.

== Seeds ==
1. (United States) Dan Cassidy / (United States) Mel Purcell (first round)
2. (Argentina) Gustavo Luza / (Argentina) Gustavo Tiberti (final)
3. (Sweden) Ronnie Båthman / (Peru) Carlos di Laura (semifinals)
4. (Brazil) Nelson Aerts / (Brazil) Luiz Mattar (semifinals)

== Draw ==
=== Key ===
- Q = Qualifier
- WC = Wild card
- LL = Lucky loser
- Alt = Alternate
- SE = Special exempt
- PR = Protected ranking
- ITF = ITF entry
- JE = Junior exempt
- w/o = Walkover
- r = Retired
- d = Defaulted
- SR = Special ranking

=== Draw ===
First round
1	(United States) D Cassidy (United States) M Purcell	3	6
(West Germany) A Maurer (Sweden) J Windahl	6	7
(Spain) J Arrese (Spain) J Bardou	3	2
(Argentina) A Ganzábal (Argentina) M Ingaramo	6	6
3	(Sweden) R Båthman (Peru) C di Laura	6	7
(Haiti) R Agénor (France) T Tulasne	4	5
(Netherlands) M Schapers (Switzerland) R Stadler	6	6
(Peru) P Arraya (Ecuador) R Viver	3	3
(Spain) J López-Maeso (Argentina) G Rivas	6	2	7
(Switzerland) M Günthardt (Hungary) Z Kuharszky	4	6	6
(Spain) J Avendaño (Spain) JA Rodríguez	5	6	5
4	(Brazil) N Aerts (Brazil) L Mattar	7	3	7
(Argentina) C Castellan (Canada) M Wostenholme	6	5	4
WC	(Switzerland) Thierry Grin (Switzerland) R Hertzog	3	7	6
(Argentina) E Bengoechea (Argentina) C Miniussi	3	4
2	(Argentina) G Luza (Argentina) G Tiberti	6	6

Quarterfinals
(West Germany) A Maurer (Sweden) J Windahl	6	6
(Argentina) A Ganzábal (Argentina) M Ingaramo	1	3
3	(Sweden) R Båthman (Peru) C di Laura	6	6
(Netherlands) M Schapers (Switzerland) R Stadler	1	1
(Spain) J López-Maeso (Argentina) G Rivas
4	(Brazil) N Aerts (Brazil) L Mattar	w/o
WC	(Switzerland) T Grin (Switzerland) R Hertzog	5	3
2	(Argentina) G Luza (Argentina) G Tiberti	7	6

Semifinals
(West Germany) A Maurer (Sweden) J Windahl	7	6
3	(Sweden) R Båthman (Peru) C di Laura	5	4
4	(Brazil) N Aerts (Brazil) L Mattar	2	6	1
2	(Argentina) G Luza (Argentina) G Tiberti	6	2	6

Final
(West Germany) A Maurer (Sweden) J Windahl	6	3	6
2	(Argentina) G Luza (Argentina) G Tiberti	4	6	4
