= 1985 Tel Aviv Open – Singles =

Singles
- 1985 Tel Aviv Open

Final
- Champion: (United States) Brad Gilbert
- Runner-up: (Israel) Amos Mansdorf
- Score: 6–3, 6–2

Events
Singles	Doubles
← 1984 ·	Tel Aviv Open	· 1986 →

Aaron Krickstein was the defending champion, but did not participate this year.

Brad Gilbert won the tournament, beating Amos Mansdorf in the final, 6–3, 6–2.

== Seeds ==
1. (United States) Brad Gilbert (champion)
2. (Argentina) Martín Jaite (second round)
3. (India) Vijay Amritraj (first round)
4. (United States) Bob Green (first round)
5. (Israel) Shahar Perkiss (semifinals)
6. (United States) Marc Flur (first round)
7. (United States) Mike De Palmer (second round)
8. (Sweden) Stefan Eriksson (first round)

== Draw ==
=== Key ===
- Q = Qualifier
- WC = Wild card
- LL = Lucky loser
- Alt = Alternate
- SE = Special exempt
- PR = Protected ranking
- ITF = ITF entry
- JE = Junior exempt
- w/o = Walkover
- r = Retired
- d = Defaulted
- SR = Special ranking

=== Finals ===
Semifinals
1	(United States) Brad Gilbert	6	6
5	(Israel) Shahar Perkiss	2	1
(United Kingdom) Jeremy Bates	5	6	2
(Israel) Amos Mansdorf	7	3	6

Final
1	(United States) Brad Gilbert	6	6
(Israel) Amos Mansdorf	3	2

=== Top half ===
First round
1	(United States) B Gilbert	6	6
(United Kingdom) S Shaw	3	2
(United States) M Doyle	6	5	3
Q	(West Germany) Karsten Schulz	4	7	6
(Italy) G Ocleppo	6	6
(West Germany) P Elter	0	3
(South Africa) D Visser	2	6
7	(United States) M De Palmer	6	7
4	(United States) B Green	5	1
Q	(West Germany) E Jelen	7	6
(South Africa) M Robertson	3	7	6
(South Africa) K Moir	6	6	3
WC	(Israel) O Motevassel	1	3
(United States) Jay Lapidus	6	6
(United States) H Solomon	5	5
5	(Israel) S Perkiss	7	7

Second round
1	(United States) B Gilbert	6	6
Q	(West Germany) Karsten Schulz	2	3
(Italy) G Ocleppo	6	6	6
7	(United States) M De Palmer	4	7	2
Q	(West Germany) E Jelen	4	6	6
(South Africa) M Robertson	6	3	2
(United States) Jay Lapidus	3	7	4
5	(Israel) S Perkiss	6	5	6

Quarterfinals
1	(United States) B Gilbert	6	6
(Italy) G Ocleppo	2	4
Q	(West Germany) E Jelen	1	6	4
5	(Israel) S Perkiss	6	3	6

Semifinals
1	(United States) B Gilbert	6	6
5	(Israel) S Perkiss	2	1

=== Bottom half ===
First round
6	(United States) M Flur	4	4
(United Kingdom) J Bates	6	6
WC	(Israel) G Bloom	1	7	7
(Israel) S Glickstein	6	6	5
Q	(Sweden) P Carlsson	6	6
(Finland) L Palin	4	2
WC	(Israel) A Naor	6	7
3	(India) V Amritraj	1	6
8	(Sweden) S Eriksson	4	2
(South Africa) C Steyn	6	6
(Israel) A Mansdorf	6	6
(Austria) Bernhard Pils	1	2
(Romania) F Segărceanu	7	1	6
(Spain) JA Rodríguez	6	6	4
Q	(West Germany) U Riglewski	3	3
2	(Argentina) M Jaite	6	6

Second round
(United Kingdom) J Bates	2	6	6
WC	(Israel) G Bloom	6	4	4
Q	(Sweden) P Carlsson	7	6
WC	(Israel) A Naor	6	2
(South Africa) C Steyn	3	2
(Israel) A Mansdorf	6	6
(Romania) F Segărceanu	6	3	6
2	(Argentina) M Jaite	3	6	2

Quarterfinals
(United Kingdom) J Bates	6	6
Q	(Sweden) P Carlsson	1	4
(Israel) A Mansdorf	7	6
(Romania) F Segărceanu	5	0

Semifinals
(United Kingdom) J Bates	5	6	2
(Israel) A Mansdorf	7	3	6
