= 1985 Nabisco Grand Prix de Verano – Doubles =

Doubles
- 1985 Nabisco Grand Prix de Verano

Final
- Champions: (Argentina) Martín Jaite (Argentina) Christian Miniussi
- Runners-up: (Argentina) Eduardo Bengoechea (Uruguay) Diego Pérez
- Score: 6–4, 6–3

Details
- Draw: 16
- Seeds: 4

Events
Singles	Doubles
← 1982 ·	Argentina Open	· 1986 →

Hans Kary and Zoltán Kuhárszky were the last tournament winners in 1982. None competed this year.

Martín Jaite and Christian Miniussi won the title by defeating Eduardo Bengoechea and Diego Pérez 6–4, 6–3 in the final.

== Seeds ==
1. (Puerto Rico) Ernie Fernández / (Sweden) Hans Simonsson (semifinals)
2. (Chile) Hans Gildemeister / (Chile) Belus Prajoux (semifinals)
3. (Argentina) Carlos Gattiker / (Argentina) Gustavo Tiberti (quarterfinals)
4. (Brazil) Thomaz Koch / (Brazil) Fernando Roese (first round)

== Draw ==
=== Key ===
- Q = Qualifier
- WC = Wild card
- LL = Lucky loser
- Alt = Alternate
- SE = Special exempt
- PR = Protected ranking
- ITF = ITF entry
- JE = Junior exempt
- w/o = Walkover
- r = Retired
- d = Defaulted
- SR = Special ranking

=== Draw ===
First round
1	(Puerto Rico) E Fernández (Sweden) H Simonsson	7	7
(Mexico) F Maciel (Argentina) R Saad	6	6
(Brazil) E Martins (Belgium) E Masso	6	6
(Argentina) R Argüello (Argentina) G Rivas	2	4
4	(Brazil) T Koch (Brazil) F Roese	2	6	3
(Argentina) M Jaite (Argentina) C Miniussi	6	4	6
(Brazil) D Campos (Brazil) J Goes	6	7
(Argentina) R Cano (Chile) Á Fillol	3	5
(Argentina) E Bengoechea (Uruguay) D Pérez	6	7
(Argentina) M Ingaramo (Argentina) G Luza	1	5
(United States) B Dickinson (Argentina) G Garetto	6	1	3
3	(Argentina) C Gattiker (Argentina) G Tiberti	3	6	6
(Brazil) C Kist (Brazil) E Oliveira	4	6	6
(Argentina) C Castellan (Argentina) G Guerrero	6	4	3
(Argentina) T Stålhandske (Argentina) JC Yunis	1	4
2	(Chile) H Gildemeister (Chile) B Prajoux	6	6

Quarterfinals
1	(Puerto Rico) E Fernández (Sweden) H Simonsson	6	4	6
(Brazil) E Martins (Belgium) E Masso	1	6	3
(Argentina) M Jaite (Argentina) C Miniussi	6	6
(Brazil) D Campos (Brazil) J Goes	4	3
(Argentina) E Bengoechea (Uruguay) D Pérez	6	6	7
3	(Argentina) C Gattiker (Argentina) G Tiberti	4	7	5
(Brazil) C Kist (Brazil) E Oliveira	1	4
2	(Chile) H Gildemeister (Chile) B Prajoux	6	6

Semifinals
1	(Puerto Rico) E Fernández (Sweden) H Simonsson	7	4	3
(Argentina) M Jaite (Argentina) C Miniussi	6	6	6
(Argentina) E Bengoechea (Uruguay) D Pérez	w/o
2	(Chile) H Gildemeister (Chile) B Prajoux

Final
(Argentina) M Jaite (Argentina) C Miniussi	6	6
(Argentina) E Bengoechea (Uruguay) D Pérez	4	3
