= 1986 Copa Banco Galicia – Doubles =

Doubles
- 1986 Copa Banco Galicia

Final
- Champions: (France) Loïc Courteau (Austria) Horst Skoff
- Runners-up: (Argentina) Gustavo Luza (Argentina) Gustavo Tiberti
- Score: 3–6, 6–4, 6–3

Details
- Draw: 16 (1WC)
- Seeds: 4

Events
Singles	Doubles
← 1985 ·	Argentina Open	· 1987 →

Martín Jaite and Christian Miniussi were the defending champions, but Jaite chose to focus on the singles tournament only. Miniussi teamed up with Javier Frana and lost in the second round to Gustavo Luza and Gustavo Tiberti.

Loïc Courteau and Horst Skoff won the title by defeating Luza and Tiberti 3–6, 6–4, 6–3 in the final.

== Seeds ==
1. (Argentina) Gustavo Luza / (Argentina) Gustavo Tiberti (final)
2. (United States) Bud Cox / (United States) Mark Dickson (first round)
3. (Chile) Ricardo Acuña / (Brazil) Carlos Kirmayr (first round)
4. (Brazil) Givaldo Barbosa / (Brazil) Ivan Kley (quarterfinals)

== Draw ==
=== Key ===
- Q = Qualifier
- WC = Wild card
- LL = Lucky loser
- Alt = Alternate
- SE = Special exempt
- PR = Protected ranking
- ITF = ITF entry
- JE = Junior exempt
- w/o = Walkover
- r = Retired
- d = Defaulted
- SR = Special ranking

=== Draw ===
First round
1	(Argentina) G Luza (Argentina) G Tiberti	7	6
(Argentina) J Frana (Argentina) C Miniussi	6	3
(United States) L Duncan (Italy) C Pistolesi	2	2
(Argentina) R Argüello (Chile) G Vacarezza	6	6
4	(Brazil) G Barbosa (Brazil) I Kley	6	5	6
WC	(Argentina) R Azar (Argentina) JC Yunis	4	7	3
(Argentina) G Guerrero (Ecuador) R Viver	2	4
(Spain) J López-Maeso (Mexico) F Maciel	6	6
(Brazil) M Hennemann (Brazil) M Menezes	2	6
(Brazil) C Kist (Brazil) J Soares	6	7
(France) L Courteau (Austria) H Skoff	6	1	6
3	(Chile) R Acuña (Brazil) C Kirmayr	4	6	4
(United States) J Berger (Argentina) R Saad	6	5	6
(Argentina) A Ganzábal (Argentina) M Ingaramo	3	7	4
(Argentina) E Bengoechea (Argentina) H de la Peña	6	6
2	(United States) B Cox (United States) M Dickson	4	2

Quarterfinals
1	(Argentina) G Luza (Argentina) G Tiberti	2	5
(Argentina) R Argüello (Chile) G Vacarezza	6	0^{r}
4	(Brazil) G Barbosa (Brazil) I Kley	4	3
(Spain) J López-Maeso (Mexico) F Maciel	6	6
(Brazil) C Kist (Brazil) J Soares	6	6	4
(France) L Courteau (Austria) H Skoff	7	2	6
(United States) J Berger (Argentina) R Saad	4	6	6
(Argentina) E Bengoechea (Argentina) H de la Peña	6	3	4

Semifinals
1	(Argentina) G Luza (Argentina) G Tiberti	6	3	6
(Spain) J López-Maeso (Mexico) F Maciel	3	6	4
(France) L Courteau (Austria) H Skoff	7	6
(United States) J Berger (Argentina) R Saad	6	4

Final
1	(Argentina) G Luza (Argentina) G Tiberti	6	4	3
(France) L Courteau (Austria) H Skoff	3	6	6
