= 1986 Geneva Open – Singles =

Singles
- 1986 Geneva Open

Final
- Champion: (France) Henri Leconte
- Runner-up: (France) Thierry Tulasne
- Score: 7–5, 6–3

Details
- Draw: 32
- Seeds: 8

Events
Singles	Doubles
← 1985 ·	Geneva Open	· 1987 →

Tomáš Šmíd was the defending champion but did not participate this year.

Henri Leconte won the title, defeating Thierry Tulasne 7–5, 6–3 in the final.

== Seeds ==
1. (France) Henri Leconte (champion)
2. (France) Thierry Tulasne (final)
3. (Argentina) Horacio de la Peña (first round)
4. (Spain) Fernando Luna (quarterfinals)
5. (Peru) Pablo Arraya (first round)
6. (Haiti) Ronald Agénor (first round)
7. (Netherlands) Michiel Schapers (first round)
8. (United States) Mel Purcell (second round)

== Draw ==
=== Key ===
- Q = Qualifier
- WC = Wild card
- LL = Lucky loser
- Alt = Alternate
- SE = Special exempt
- PR = Protected ranking
- ITF = ITF entry
- JE = Junior exempt
- w/o = Walkover
- r = Retired
- d = Defaulted
- SR = Special ranking

=== Finals ===
Semifinals
1	(France) Henri Leconte	6	6
(Argentina) Eduardo Bengoechea	4	3
(Argentina) Christian Miniussi	2	0
2	(France) Thierry Tulasne	6	6

Final
1	(France) Henri Leconte	7	6
2	(France) Thierry Tulasne	5	3

=== Top half ===
First round
1	(France) H Leconte	6	6
(Argentina) R Argüello	4	1
(Argentina) A Ganzábal	4	3
(Sweden) J Windahl	6	6
(Spain) J Lópe-Maeso	5	6	2
(Canada) M Wostenholme	7	4	6
(Brazil) N Aerts	1	6	2
8	(United States) M Purcell	6	3	6
3	(Argentina) H de la Peña	3	5
(West Germany) A Maurer	6	7
(Spain) J Avendaño	6	7
(Sweden) R Båthman	3	6
(Argentina) E Bengoechea	7	6
Q	(Argentina) G Tiberti	6	2
Q	(Argentina) C Castellan	3	6	7
6	(Haiti) R Agénor	6	4	6

Second round
1	(France) H Leconte	6	6
(Sweden) J Windahl	3	3
(Canada) M Wostenholme	6	6
8	(United States) M Purcell	2	1
(West Germany) A Maurer	4	2
(Spain) J Avendaño	6	6
(Argentina) E Bengoechea	3	6	6
Q	(Argentina) C Castellan	6	3	0

Quarterfinals
1	(France) H Leconte	6	6
(Canada) M Wostenholme	4	3
(Spain) J Avendaño	3	6
(Argentina) E Bengoechea	6	7

Semifinals
1	(France) H Leconte	6	6
(Argentina) E Bengoechea	4	3

=== Bottom half ===
First round
5	(Peru) P Arraya	1	4
(Argentina) C Miniussi	6	6
WC	(Switzerland) R Hertzog	4	3
(United States) J Brown	6	6
(Spain) JA Rodríguez	4	5
(Spain) J Arrese	6	7
WC	(Argentina) G Pérez Roldán	5	0
4	(Spain) F Luna	7	6
7/WC	(Netherlands) M Schapers	1	1
Q	(Spain) J Bardou	6	6
(Peru) C di Laura	6	6
Q	(France) P Torre	4	4
(Socialist Federal Republic of Yugoslavia) M Ostoja	2	1
(Switzerland) R Stadler	6	6
(Brazil) L Mattar	4	6	2
2	(France) T Tulasne	6	3	6

Second round
(Argentina) C Miniussi	6	6
(United States) J Brown	3	0
(Spain) J Arrese	0	3
4	(Spain) F Luna	6	6
Q	(Spain) J Bardou	7	6
(Peru) C di Laura	6	4
(Switzerland) R Stadler	3	6	1
2	(France) T Tulasne	6	1	6

Quarterfinals
(Argentina) C Miniussi	4	6	6
4	(Spain) F Luna	6	4	4
Q	(Spain) J Bardou	2	2
2	(France) T Tulasne	6	6

Semifinals
(Argentina) C Miniussi	2	0
2	(France) T Tulasne	6	6
