= 1989 Mercedes Cup – Doubles =

Doubles
- 1989 Mercedes Cup

Final
- Champions: (Czechoslovakia) Petr Korda (Czechoslovakia) Tomáš Šmíd
- Runners-up: (Romania) Florin Segărceanu (Czechoslovakia) Cyril Suk
- Score: 6–3, 6–4

Details
- Draw: 24
- Seeds: 8

Events
| Singles | Doubles |
| ← 1988 · | Stuttgart Open | · 1990 → |

Sergio Casal and Emilio Sánchez were the defending champions, but none competed this year. Casal suffered a wrist injury, while Sánchez chose to compete at Hilversum during the same week.

Petr Korda and Tomáš Šmíd won the title by defeating Florin Segărceanu and Cyril Suk 6–3, 6–4 in the final.

== Seeds ==
All seeds received a bye into the second round.

1. (United States) Kevin Curren / (Australia) John Fitzgerald (second round)
2. (Czechoslovakia) Petr Korda / (Czechoslovakia) Tomáš Šmíd (champions)
3. (United States) Marty Davis / (Hungary) Balázs Taróczy (semifinals)
4. (Iran) Mansour Bahrami / (France) Éric Winogradsky (second round)
5. (Ecuador) Andrés Gómez / (Argentina) Alberto Mancini (quarterfinals)
6. (Sweden) Peter Svensson / (Sweden) Jörgen Windahl (quarterfinals)
7. (Sweden) Ronnie Båthman / (Sweden) Mikael Pernfors (second round)
8. (Czechoslovakia) Jaroslav Navrátil / (Czechoslovakia) Richard Vogel (second round)

== Draw ==
=== Key ===
- Q = Qualifier
- WC = Wild card
- LL = Lucky loser
- Alt = Alternate
- ITF = ITF entry
- PR = Protected ranking
- SR = Special ranking
- SE = Special exempt
- JE = Junior exempt
- JR = Junior Accelerator Programme entrant
- CO = College Accelerator Programme entrant
- NG = Next Gen Accelerator Program entrant
- w/o = Walkover
- r = Retired
- d = Defaulted

=== Finals ===
Semifinals
(Romania) Florin Segărceanu (Czechoslovakia) Cyril Suk | 4 | 6 | 6
(Argentina) Martín Jaite (Argentina) Guillermo Pérez Roldán | 6 | 4 | 0
3 | (United States) Marty Davis (Hungary) Balázs Taróczy | 3 | 4
2 | (Czechoslovakia) Petr Korda (Czechoslovakia) Tomáš Šmíd | 6 | 6

Final
(Romania) Florin Segărceanu (Czechoslovakia) Cyril Suk | 3 | 4
2 | (Czechoslovakia) Petr Korda (Czechoslovakia) Tomáš Šmíd | 6 | 6

=== Top half ===
First round
(Romania) F Segărceanu (Czechoslovakia) C Suk | 7 | 6
(Czechoslovakia) M Mečíř (Czechoslovakia) B Stankovič | 5 | 4
(Soviet Union) A Olhovskiy (Soviet Union) A Volkov | 6 | 6
(Italy) F Cancellotti (Italy) S Colombo | 4 | 4
(Ecuador) H Núñez (Ecuador) R Viver | 7 | 4 | 4
(Argentina) M Jaite (Argentina) G Pérez Roldán | 6 | 6 | 6
(Sweden) J Gunnarsson (Sweden) J Svensson | 6 | 4
(Czechoslovakia) V Flégl (Czechoslovakia) M Vajda | 7 | 6

Second round
1 | (United States) K Curren (Australia) J Fitzgerald | 4 | 6 | 6
(Romania) F Segărceanu (Czechoslovakia) C Suk | 6 | 4 | 7
(Soviet Union) A Olhovskiy (Soviet Union) A Volkov | 6 | 6
8 | (Czechoslovakia) J Navrátil (Czechoslovakia) R Vogel | 2 | 2
4 | (Iran) M Bahrami (France) É Winogradsky | 6 | 6 | 3
(Argentina) M Jaite (Argentina) G Pérez Roldán | 0 | 7 | 6
(Czechoslovakia) V Flégl (Czechoslovakia) M Vajda | 4 | 4
5 | (Ecuador) A Gómez (Argentina) A Mancini | 6 | 6

Quarterfinals
(Romania) F Segărceanu (Czechoslovakia) C Suk | 6 | 6
(Soviet Union) A Olhovskiy (Soviet Union) A Volkov | 2 | 2
(Argentina) M Jaite (Argentina) G Pérez Roldán | 7 | 2 | 7
5 | (Ecuador) A Gómez (Argentina) A Mancini | 5 | 6 | 5

Semifinals
(Romania) F Segărceanu (Czechoslovakia) C Suk | 4 | 6 | 6
(Argentina) M Jaite (Argentina) G Pérez Roldán | 6 | 4 | 0

=== Bottom half ===
First round
(Spain) J Arrese (Spain) JC Báguena | 6 | 5
(France) R Gilbert (France) T Tulasne | 7 | 7
(West Germany) Rene Gramminger (West Germany) Lutz Mieschke | 2 | 2
(Austria) A Antonitsch (Argentina) H de la Peña | 6 | 6
(Haiti) R Agénor (Morocco) Driss Ben Omar | 2 | 1
(Argentina) E Bengoechea (Uruguay) M Filippini | 6 | 6
(Socialist Federal Republic of Yugoslavia) B Orešar (Socialist Federal Republic of Yugoslavia) G Prpić | 5 | 6 | 6
(Argentina) P Albano (Argentina) M Ingaramo | 7 | 2 | 2

Second round
6 | (Sweden) P Svensson (Sweden) J Windahl | 6 | 4 | 6
(France) R Gilbert (France) T Tulasne | 3 | 6 | 4
(Austria) A Antonitsch (Argentina) H de la Peña | 5 | 6 | 5
3 | (United States) M Davis (Hungary) B Taróczy | 7 | 2 | 7
7 | (Sweden) R Båthman (Sweden) M Pernfors | 7 | 3 | 1
(Argentina) E Bengoechea (Uruguay) M Filippini | 6 | 6 | 6
(Socialist Federal Republic of Yugoslavia) B Orešar (Socialist Federal Republic of Yugoslavia) G Prpić | 4 | 4
2 | (Czechoslovakia) P Korda (Czechoslovakia) T Šmíd | 6 | 6

Quarterfinals
6 | (Sweden) P Svensson (Sweden) J Windahl | 7 | 4 | 0
3 | (United States) M Davis (Hungary) B Taróczy | 6 | 6 | 6
(Argentina) E Bengoechea (Uruguay) M Filippini | 2 | 1
2 | (Czechoslovakia) P Korda (Czechoslovakia) T Šmíd | 6 | 6

Semifinals
3 | (United States) M Davis (Hungary) B Taróczy | 3 | 4
2 | (Czechoslovakia) P Korda (Czechoslovakia) T Šmíd | 6 | 6
