= 1985 Nabisco Grand Prix de Verano – Singles =

Singles
- 1985 Buenos Aires Grand Prix

Final
- Champion: (Argentina) Martín Jaite
- Runner-up: (Uruguay) Diego Pérez
- Score: 6–4, 6–2

Details
- Draw: 32
- Seeds: 8

Events
Singles	Doubles
← 1982 ·	Buenos Aires Grand Prix	· 1986 →

Martín Jaite defeated Diego Pérez 6–4, 6–2 to win the 1985 Buenos Aires Grand Prix singles competition. Guillermo Vilas was the champion but did not defend his title.

== Seeds ==
1. (Uruguay) Diego Pérez (final)
2. (Argentina) Alejandro Ganzábal (first round)
3. (Argentina) Martín Jaite (champion)
4. (Chile) Hans Gildemeister (first round)
5. (Argentina) Horacio de la Peña (semifinals)
6. (United States) Jimmy Brown (semifinals)
7. (Argentina) Eduardo Bengoechea (first round)
8. (Argentina) Roberto Argüello (quarterfinals)

== Draw ==
=== Key ===
- Q = Qualifier
- WC = Wild card
- LL = Lucky loser
- Alt = Alternate
- SE = Special exempt
- PR = Protected ranking
- ITF = ITF entry
- JE = Junior exempt
- w/o = Walkover
- r = Retired
- d = Defaulted
- SR = Special ranking

=== Finals ===
Semifinals
1	(Uruguay) Diego Pérez	6	6
WC/6	(United States) Jimmy Brown	2	4
3	(Argentina) Martín Jaite	7	6
5	(Argentina) Horacio de la Peña	5	2

Final
1	(Uruguay) Diego Pérez	4	2
3	(Argentina) Martín Jaite	6	6

=== Top half ===
First round
1	(Uruguay) D Pérez	6	6
(Brazil) D Campos	3	3
(Chile) A Fillol	6	6
Q	(Argentina) G Minutella	2	2
(Argentina) C Castellan	6	4	3
Q	(Argentina) G Tiberti	1	6	6
(Brazil) E Martins	3	2
8	(Argentina) R Argüello	6	6
4	(Chile) H Gildemeister	6	3	4
WC	(Argentina) F Davín	4	6	6
(Ecuador) R Viver	6	6
(United States) J Canter	3	1
(Argentina) G Rivas	2	6	4
(Argentina) C Miniussi	6	4	6
(Brazil) F Roese	5	1
WC/6	(United States) J Brown	7	6

Second round
1	(Uruguay) D Pérez	6	6
(Chile) A Fillol	1	4
Q	(Argentina) G Tiberti	0	5
8	(Argentina) R Argüello	6	7
WC	(Argentina) F Davín	2	3
(Ecuador) R Viver	6	6
(Argentina) C Miniussi	6	4
WC/6	(United States) J Brown	7	6

Quarterfinals
1	(Uruguay) D Pérez	6	6
8	(Argentina) R Argüello	3	3
(Ecuador) R Viver	3	3
WC/6	(United States) J Brown	6	6

Semifinals
1	(Uruguay) D Pérez	6	6
WC/6	(United States) J Brown	2	4

=== Bottom half ===
First round
7	(Argentina) E Bengoechea	6	2	4
(Mexico) F Maciel	4	6	6
(Brazil) J Góes	7	6
Q	(Argentina) G Luza	6	2
Q	(Argentina) G Garetto	2	7	4
WC	(Argentina) G Guerrero	6	5	6
(Brazil) C Kist	3	4
3	(Argentina) M Jaite	6	6
5	(Argentina) H de la Peña	6	6
(United States) L Duncan	2	4
(Puerto Rico) E Fernandez	3	6	6
(Brazil) I Kley	6	4	7
(Argentina) M Ingaramo	7	7
(Chile) P Rebolledo	5	6
(Sweden) H Simonsson	6	6
2	(Argentina) A Ganzábal	4	4

Second round
(Mexico) F Maciel	6	7
(Brazil) J Góes	3	5
WC	(Argentina) G Guerrero	5	1
3	(Argentina) M Jaite	7	6
5	(Argentina) H de la Peña	7	6
(Brazil) I Kley	5	2
(Argentina) M Ingaramo	4	6	7
(Sweden) H Simonsson	6	1	5

Quarterfinals
(Mexico) F Maciel	3	1
3	(Argentina) M Jaite	6	6
5	(Argentina) H de la Peña	6	6
(Argentina) M Ingaramo	3	4

Semifinals
3	(Argentina) M Jaite	7	6
5	(Argentina) H de la Peña	5	2
