= 1986 Copa Banco Galicia – Singles =

Singles
- 1986 Copa Banco Galicia

Final
- Champion: (United States) Jay Berger
- Runner-up: (Argentina) Franco Davín
- Score: 6–3, 6–3

Details
- Draw: 32
- Seeds: 8

Events
Singles	Doubles
- Copa Banco Galicia

Martín Jaite was the defending champion but lost in the second round to Franco Davín.

Jay Berger won in the final 6–3, 6–3 against Franco Davín.

== Seeds ==
1. (Argentina) Martín Jaite (second round)
2. (Argentina) Horacio de la Peña (second round)
3. (Austria) Horst Skoff (second round)
4. (Mexico) Francisco Maciel (quarterfinals)
5. (Argentina) Eduardo Bengoechea (first round)
6. (Argentina) Christian Miniussi (first round)
7. (Brazil) Carlos Kirmayr (first round)
8. (United States) Mark Dickson (first round)

== Draw ==
Key

- Q = Qualifier
- WC = Wild card
- LL = Lucky loser
- Alt = Alternate
- ITF = ITF entry
- PR = Protected ranking
- SR = Special ranking
- SE = Special exempt
- JE = Junior exempt
- JR = Junior Accelerator Programme entrant
- CO = College Accelerator Programme entrant
- NG = Next Gen Accelerator Program entrant
- w/o = Walkover
- r = Retired
- d = Defaulted

=== Finals ===
Semifinals
WC	(Argentina) Franco Davín	6	6
Q	(Argentina) Roberto Argüello	2	0
(United States) Jay Berger	6	4	6
(Argentina) Guillermo Pérez Roldán	2	6	4

Final
WC	(Argentina) Franco Davín	3	3
(United States) Jay Berger	6	6

=== Top half ===
First round
1	(Argentina) M Jaite	6	6
LL	(Argentina) R Azar	3	2
(United States) L Duncan	6	2	4
WC	(Argentina) F Davín	2	6	6
Q	(Chile) G Vacarezza	4	7	6
(Argentina) G Guerrero	6	5	0
(Argentina) A Ganzábal	1	6	6
8	(United States) M Dickson	6	1	4
3	(Austria) H Skoff	6	7
WC	(Argentina) G Rivas	1	6
Q	(Argentina) R Argüello	6	6
(Argentina) R Saad	0	1
(Brazil) J Soares	3	0
(Spain) J López-Maeso	6	6
(Brazil) C Kist	6	6
6	(Argentina) C Miniussi	2	3

Second round
1	(Argentina) M Jaite	4	5
WC	(Argentina) F Davín	6	7
Q	(Chile) G Vacarezza	2	4
(Argentina) A Ganzábal	6	6
3	(Austria) H Skoff	6	7	4
Q	(Argentina) R Argüello	7	5	6
(Spain) J López-Maeso	6	6
(Brazil) C Kist	3	2

Quarterfinals
WC	(Argentina) F Davín	6	7
(Argentina) A Ganzábal	3	5
Q	(Argentina) R Argüello	6	6
(Spain) J López-Maeso	0	4

Semifinals
WC	(Argentina) F Davín	6	6
Q	(Argentina) R Argüello	2	0

=== Bottom half ===
First round
5	(Argentina) E Bengoechea	5	5
(United States) J Berger	7	7
WC	(Argentina) C Castellan	2	6	3
(Italy) C Pistolesi	6	2	6
(Brazil) I Kley	5	4
(Argentina) J Frana	7	6
(Argentina) M Ingaramo	3	6	3
4	(Mexico) F Maciel	6	3	6
7	(Brazil) C Kirmayr	4	3
(Argentina) G Pérez Roldán	6	6
Q	(Paraguay) H Chapacu	6	6
(Chile) R Acuña	4	2
(West Germany) C Steeb	6	6
(Czechoslovakia) M Vajda	3	2
Q	(Argentina) G Tiberti	6	5
2	(Argentina) H de la Peña	7	7

Second round
(United States) J Berger	2	6	6
(Italy) C Pistolesi	6	2	4
(Argentina) J Frana	4	6	1
4	(Mexico) F Maciel	6	3	6
(Argentina) G Pérez Roldán	3	6	6
Q	(Paraguay) H Chapacu	6	0	0
(West Germany) C Steeb	6	6
2	(Argentina) H de la Peña	3	4

Quarterfinals
(United States) J Berger	6	3	7
4	(Mexico) F Maciel	4	6	5
(Argentina) G Pérez Roldán	6	6
(West Germany) C Steeb	3	1

Semifinals
(United States) J Berger	6	4	6
(Argentina) G Pérez Roldán	2	6	4
