= 1986 Geneva Open =

- Date: 8–15 September
- Edition: 7th
- Category: Grand Prix
- Draw: 32S / 16D
- Prize money: $200,000
- Surface: Clay / outdoor
- Location: Geneva, Switzerland

Champions

Singles
- (France) Henri Leconte

Doubles
- (West Germany) Andreas Maurer / (Sweden) Jörgen Windahl
- Geneva Open

The 1986 Geneva Open was a men's tennis tournament played on outdoor clay courts that was part of the 1986 Nabisco Grand Prix. It was the seventh edition of the tournament and was played at Geneva in Switzerland from 8 September through 15 September 1986. First-seeded Henri Leconte won the singles title.

== Finals ==
=== Singles ===
(France) Henri Leconte defeated (France) Thierry Tulasne 7–5, 6–3

- It was Leconte's 1st singles title of the year and the 5th of his career.

=== Doubles ===
(West Germany) Andreas Maurer / (Sweden) Jörgen Windahl defeated (Argentina) Gustavo Luza / (Argentina) Gustavo Tiberti 6–4, 3–6, 6–4

- It was Maurer's only title of the year and the 3rd of his career. It was Windahl's only title of the year and the 1st of his career.
