= 1990 Mercedes Cup – Singles =

Singles
- 1990 Mercedes Cup

Final
- Champion: (Socialist Federal Republic of Yugoslavia) Goran Ivanišević
- Runner-up: (Argentina) Guillermo Pérez Roldán
- Score: 6–7^{(2–7)}, 6–1, 6–4, 7–6^{(7–5)}

Details
- Draw: 48 (3WC/5Q)
- Seeds: 16

Events
Singles	Doubles
- Stuttgart Open

Martín Jaite was the defending champion, but lost in the second round to Karel Nováček.

Tenth-seeded Goran Ivanišević won the title by defeating Guillermo Pérez Roldán 6–7^{(2–7)}, 6–1, 6–4, 7–6^{(7–5)} in the final.

== Seeds ==
All seeds received a bye into the second round.

1. (Ecuador) Andrés Gómez (third round)
2. (Austria) Thomas Muster (second round, retired)
3. (Spain) Emilio Sánchez (semifinals)
4. (Argentina) Martín Jaite (second round)
5. (Soviet Union) Andrei Chesnokov (third round)
6. (United States) Jim Courier (second round)
7. (Spain) Juan Aguilera (second round)
8. (France) Guy Forget (second round)
9. (Argentina) Guillermo Pérez Roldán (final)
10. (Socialist Federal Republic of Yugoslavia) Goran Ivanišević (champion)
11. (West Germany) Carl-Uwe Steeb (second round)
12. (France) Henri Leconte (semifinals)
13. (Czechoslovakia) Petr Korda (second round)
14. (Switzerland) Marc Rosset (second round)
15. (Sweden) Mats Wilander (second round)
16. (Austria) Horst Skoff (quarterfinals)

== Draw ==
Key

- Q = Qualifier
- WC = Wild card
- LL = Lucky loser
- Alt = Alternate
- ITF = ITF entry
- PR = Protected ranking
- SR = Special ranking
- SE = Special exempt
- JE = Junior exempt
- JR = Junior Accelerator Programme entrant
- CO = College Accelerator Programme entrant
- NG = Next Gen Accelerator Program entrant
- w/o = Walkover
- r = Retired
- d = Defaulted

=== Finals ===
Quarterfinals
16	(Austria) Horst Skoff	6	3	6^{4}
9	(Argentina) Guillermo Pérez Roldán	2	6	7^{7}
(Soviet Union) Andrei Cherkasov	6	4	4
12	(France) Henri Leconte	4	6	6
(Uruguay) Marcelo Filippini	6	2
3	(Spain) Emilio Sánchez	7	6
10	(Socialist Federal Republic of Yugoslavia) Goran Ivanišević	6	6
WC	(West Germany) Eric Jelen	2	3

Semifinals
9	(Argentina) Guillermo Pérez Roldán	6^{3}	6	7^{7}
12	(France) Henri Leconte	7^{7}	3	6^{5}
3	(Spain) Emilio Sánchez	4	4
10	(Socialist Federal Republic of Yugoslavia) Goran Ivanišević	6	6

Final
9	(Argentina) Guillermo Pérez Roldán	7^{7}	1	4	6^{5}
10	(Socialist Federal Republic of Yugoslavia) Goran Ivanišević	6^{2}	6	6	7^{7}

=== Top half ===
==== Section 1 ====
First round
(Brazil) L Mattar	6	6	7
WC	(West Germany) M Sinner	3	7	5
(United States) J Arias	6	6
(Argentina) A Mancini	4	3
(West Germany) U Riglewski	5	4
(Spain) S Bruguera	7	6
(Socialist Federal Republic of Yugoslavia) G Prpić	7	7
(Spain) F Clavet	6	5

Second round
1	(Ecuador) A Gómez	7	6
(Brazil) L Mattar	5	4
(United States) J Arias	2	4
16	(Austria) H Skoff	6	6
9	(Argentina) G Pérez Roldán	6	6
(Spain) S Bruguera	2	4
(Socialist Federal Republic of Yugoslavia) G Prpić	6	7
8	(France) G Forget	2	6

Third round
1	(Ecuador) A Gómez	5	6	4
16	(Austria) H Skoff	7	0	6
9	(Argentina) G Pérez Roldán	6	6
(Socialist Federal Republic of Yugoslavia) G Prpić	4	3

Quarterfinals
16	(Austria) H Skoff	6	3	6^{4}
9	(Argentina) G Pérez Roldán	2	6	7^{7}

==== Section 2 ====
First round
(Czechoslovakia) K Nováček	6	6
(United Kingdom) J Bates	1	2
(Soviet Union) A Cherkasov	6	5	6
(Sweden) J Gunnarsson	2	7	4
Q	(Sweden) J Windahl	4
(Austria) A Antonitsch	0^{r}
(France) JP Fleurian	7	4	6
(Peru) J Yzaga	5	6	7

Second round
4	(Argentina) M Jaite	5	7	1
(Czechoslovakia) K Nováček	7	6	6
(Soviet Union) A Cherkasov	7	6
13	(Czechoslovakia) P Korda	6	1
12	(France) H Leconte	6	6
Q	(Sweden) J Windahl	4	2
(Peru) J Yzaga	3	3
5	(Soviet Union) A Chesnokov	6	6

Third round
(Czechoslovakia) K Nováček	5	6	4
(Soviet Union) A Cherkasov	7	3	6
12	(France) H Leconte	7	6
5	(Soviet Union) A Chesnokov	5	3

Quarterfinals
(Soviet Union) A Cherkasov	6	4	4
12	(France) H Leconte	4	6	6

=== Bottom half ===
==== Section 3 ====
First round
(Uruguay) M Filippini	6	7
(Haiti) R Agénor	4	6
(Spain) T Carbonell	2	7	6
Q	(West Germany) H Schwaier	6	6	3
Q	(France) T Tulasne	6	2	5
(Australia) R Fromberg	4	6	7
(Netherlands) P Haarhuis	4	4
(West Germany) J Wöhrmann	6	6

Second round
6	(United States) J Courier	2	4
(Uruguay) M Filippini	6	6
(Spain) T Carbonell	6	7
11	(West Germany) CU Steeb	3	5
14	(Switzerland) M Rosset	1	3
(Australia) R Fromberg	6	6
(West Germany) J Wöhrmann	6	3	3
3	(Spain) E Sánchez	4	6	6

Third round
(Uruguay) M Filippini	6	6
(Spain) T Carbonell	2	4
(Australia) R Fromberg	3	6	2
3	(Spain) E Sánchez	6	2	6

Quarterfinals
(Uruguay) M Filippini	6	2
3	(Spain) E Sánchez	7	6

==== Section 4 ====
First round
(Australia) W Masur	6	6	6
(Spain) J Arrese	7	4	3
Q	(Czechoslovakia) R Vogel	6	2
(Spain) J Sánchez	7	6
WC	(Sweden) C Bergström	7	2	4
(Argentina) F Davín	5	6	6
WC	(West Germany) E Jelen	6	6	7
Q	(France) O Delaître	7	1	5

Second round
7	(Spain) J Aguilera	6	5
(Australia) W Masur	7	7
(Spain) J Sánchez	2	3
10	(Socialist Federal Republic of Yugoslavia) G Ivanišević	6	6
15	(Sweden) M Wilander	1	6	2
(Argentina) F Davín	6	4	6
WC	(West Germany) E Jelen	4	6	2
2	(Austria) T Muster	6	2	0^{r}

Third round
(Australia) W Masur	2	7	4
10	(Socialist Federal Republic of Yugoslavia) G Ivanišević	6	6	6
(Argentina) F Davín	6	6^{2}	3
WC	(West Germany) E Jelen	4	7^{7}	6

Quarterfinals
10	(Socialist Federal Republic of Yugoslavia) G Ivanišević	6	6
WC	(West Germany) E Jelen	2	3
