= 1988 Mercedes Cup – Singles =

Singles
- 1988 Mercedes Cup

Final
- Champion: (United States) Andre Agassi
- Runner-up: (Ecuador) Andrés Gómez
- Score: 6–4, 6–2

Details
- Draw: 48 (4WC/6Q/1LL)
- Seeds: 16

Events
Singles	Doubles
- Stuttgart Open

Miloslav Mečíř was the defending champion, but lost in the third round to Thomas Muster.

Second-seeded Andre Agassi won the title by defeating Andrés Gómez 6–4, 6–2 in the final.

== Seeds ==
All seeds received a bye to the second round.

1. (Czechoslovakia) Miloslav Mečíř (third round)
2. (United States) Andre Agassi (champion)
3. (United States) Brad Gilbert (third round)
4. (France) Yannick Noah (quarterfinals)
5. (Sweden) Kent Carlsson (third round)
6. (France) Henri Leconte (semifinals)
7. (Sweden) Jonas Svensson (quarterfinals)
8. (Spain) Emilio Sánchez (third round)
9. (Argentina) Guillermo Pérez Roldán (semifinals)
10. (Sweden) Anders Järryd (second round)
11. (Ecuador) Andrés Gómez (final)
12. (Argentina) Martín Jaite (third round)
13. (Haiti) Ronald Agénor (quarterfinals)
14. (n/a)
15. (Spain) Jordi Arrese (second round)
16. (Czechoslovakia) Tomáš Šmíd (third round)

== Draw ==
Key

- Q = Qualifier
- WC = Wild card
- LL = Lucky loser
- Alt = Alternate
- ITF = ITF entry
- PR = Protected ranking
- SR = Special ranking
- SE = Special exempt
- JE = Junior exempt
- JR = Junior Accelerator Programme entrant
- CO = College Accelerator Programme entrant
- NG = Next Gen Accelerator Program entrant
- w/o = Walkover
- r = Retired
- d = Defaulted

=== Finals ===
Quarterfinals
(Austria) Thomas Muster	2	5
9	(Argentina) Guillermo Pérez Roldán	6	7
4	(France) Yannick Noah	3	3
11	(Ecuador) Andrés Gómez	6	6
6	(France) Henri Leconte	6	6
13	(Haiti) Ronald Agénor	3	4
7	(Sweden) Jonas Svensson	5	1
2	(United States) Andre Agassi	7	6

Semifinals
9	(Argentina) Guillermo Pérez Roldán	3	1
11	(Ecuador) Andrés Gómez	6	6
6	(France) Henri Leconte	5	5
2	(United States) Andre Agassi	7	7

Final
11	(Ecuador) Andrés Gómez	4	2
2	(United States) Andre Agassi	6	6

=== Top half ===
==== Section 1 ====
First round
(France) T Tulasne	6	6
(France) G Forget	3	2
(Australia) M Woodforde	6	1	1
(Austria) T Muster	3	6	6
Q	(West Germany) A Mronz	5	4
(West Germany) D Keretić	7	6
(France) J Potier	3	7	5
(Czechoslovakia) M Šrejber	6	5	7

Second round
1/WC	(Czechoslovakia) M Mečíř	6	2	6
(France) T Tulasne	3	6	2
(Austria) T Muster	6	4	6
15	(Spain) J Arrese	3	6	2
9	(Argentina) G Pérez Roldán	5	6	7
(West Germany) D Keretić	7	3	5
(Czechoslovakia) M Šrejber	5	6	3
8	(Spain) E Sánchez	7	4	6

Third round
1/WC	(Czechoslovakia) M Mečíř	4	6
(Austria) T Muster	6	7
9	(Argentina) G Pérez Roldán	6	6
8	(Spain) E Sánchez	4	3

Quarterfinals
(Austria) T Muster	2	5
9	(Argentina) G Pérez Roldán	6	7

==== Section 2 ====
First round
(Argentina) A Mancini	6	4	6
(Czechoslovakia) M Vajda	4	6	4
(Switzerland) C Mezzadri	6	1	4
(Argentina) E Bengoechea	3	6	6
(Argentina) F Davín	6	3	5
(France) É Winogradsky	4	6	7
WC	(Japan) S Matsuoka	6	6
(West Germany) CU Steeb	4	2

Second round
4	(France) Y Noah	6	6
(Argentina) A Mancini	1	4
(Argentina) E Bengoechea	5	6	6
LL	(Australia) C Limberger	7	1	1
11	(Ecuador) A Gómez	6	6
(France) É Winogradsky	3	2
WC	(Japan) S Matsuoka	6	4
5	(Sweden) K Carlsson	7	6

Third round
4	(France) Y Noah	6	6
(Argentina) E Bengoechea	3	1
11	(Ecuador) A Gómez	6	6	7
5	(Sweden) K Carlsson	4	7	5

Quarterfinals
4	(France) Y Noah	3	3
11	(Ecuador) A Gómez	6	6

=== Bottom half ===
==== Section 3 ====
First round
(West Germany) T Meinecke	3	3
Q	(Chile) S Cortés	6	6
(Chile) P Rebolledo	2	3
Q	(West Germany) M Westphal	6	6
(Switzerland) J Hlasek	6	6
(West Germany) C Saceanu	3	2
(Argentina) G Vilas	3	6	3
(Australia) D Cahill	6	1	6

Second round
6	(France) H Leconte	6	7
Q	(Chile) S Cortés	0	6
Q	(West Germany) M Westphal	4	3
12	(Argentina) M Jaite	6	6
13	(Haiti) R Agénor	6	6
(Switzerland) J Hlasek	3	3
(Australia) D Cahill	4	6
3	(United States) B Gilbert	6	7

Third round
6	(France) H Leconte	6	6
12	(Argentina) M Jaite	3	2
13	(Haiti) R Agénor	2	6	6
3	(United States) B Gilbert	6	3	4

Quarterfinals
6	(France) H Leconte	6	6
13	(Haiti) R Agénor	3	4

==== Section 4 ====
First round
WC	(Sweden) M Tideman	4	6	6
Q	(Iran) M Bahrami	6	3	7
(Spain) S Casal	6	6
Q	(Argentina) R Azar	3	2
(West Germany) P Vojtischek	6	6
WC	(West Germany) A Maurer	4	2
(West Germany) R Osterthun	6	6
Q	(Australia) L Warder	3	2

Second round
7	(Sweden) J Svensson	6	3	6
Q	(Iran) M Bahrami	3	6	0
(Spain) S Casal	6	2	6
10	(Sweden) A Järryd	2	6	4
16	(Czechoslovakia) T Šmíd	7	1	6
(West Germany) P Vojtischek	6	6	4
(West Germany) R Osterthun	3	5
2	(United States) A Agassi	6	7

Third round
7	(Sweden) J Svensson	6	6
(Spain) S Casal	2	1
16	(Czechoslovakia) T Šmíd	5	2
2	(United States) A Agassi	7	6

Quarterfinals
7	(Sweden) J Svensson	5	1
2	(United States) A Agassi	7	6
