= 1986 Tel Aviv Open – Singles =

Singles
- 1986 Tel Aviv Open

Final
- Champion: (United States) Brad Gilbert
- Runner-up: (United States) Aaron Krickstein
- Score: 7–5, 6–2

Details
- Draw: 32
- Seeds: 8

Events
Singles	Doubles
- Tel Aviv Open

Brad Gilbert was the defending champion.

Gilbert successfully defended his title, beating Aaron Krickstein in the final, 7–5, 6–2.

== Seeds ==
1. (United States) Brad Gilbert (champion)
2. (United States) Aaron Krickstein (final)
3. (Sweden) Peter Lundgren (second round)
4. (South Africa) Christo Steyn (semifinals)
5. (South Africa) Eddie Edwards (first round)
6. (Israel) Amos Mansdorf (semifinals)
7. (United States) Mark Dickson (first round)
8. (South Africa) Danie Visser (first round)

== Draw ==
Key

- Q = Qualifier
- WC = Wild card
- LL = Lucky loser
- Alt = Alternate
- ITF = ITF entry
- PR = Protected ranking
- SR = Special ranking
- SE = Special exempt
- JE = Junior exempt
- JR = Junior Accelerator Programme entrant
- CO = College Accelerator Programme entrant
- NG = Next Gen Accelerator Program entrant
- w/o = Walkover
- r = Retired
- d = Defaulted

=== Finals ===
Semifinals
1	(United States) Brad Gilbert	6	6
4	(South Africa) Christo Steyn	4	3
6	(Israel) Amos Mansdorf	3	4
2	(United States) Aaron Krickstein	6	6

Final
1	(United States) Brad Gilbert	7	6
2	(United States) Aaron Krickstein	5	2

=== Top half ===
First round
1	(United States) B Gilbert	7	7
(Sweden) T Högstedt	5	6
(Israel) S Perkiss	2	6	6
(United States) C Hooper	6	1	4
Q	(West Germany) I Werner	6	2	4
(Sweden) R Båthman	4	6	6
WC	(Israel) G Bloom	6	3	6
7	(United States) M Dickson	2	6	1
4	(South Africa) C Steyn	6	6
(Brazil) J Góes	3	2
(United States) B Green	6	3	6
(West Germany) P Moraing	3	6	1
(New Zealand) K Evernden	6	4	1
(Netherlands) M Oosting	4	6	6
(West Germany) M Westphal	3	6	7
5	(South Africa) E Edwards	6	4	5

Second round
1	(United States) B Gilbert	6	7
(Israel) S Perkiss	4	6
(Sweden) R Båthman	4	4
WC	(Israel) G Bloom	6	6
4	(South Africa) C Steyn	3	6	6
(United States) B Green	6	1	2
(Netherlands) M Oosting	3	4
(West Germany) M Westphal	6	6

Quarterfinals
1	(United States) B Gilbert	6	1	7
WC	(Israel) G Bloom	3	6	5
4	(South Africa) C Steyn	6	6
(West Germany) M Westphal	1	3

Semifinals
1	(United States) B Gilbert	6	6
4	(South Africa) C Steyn	4	3

=== Bottom half ===
First round
6	(Israel) A Mansdorf	6	4	6
Q	(United States) L Scott	3	6	4
LL	(South Africa) B Levine	6	6	6
(United States) B Cox	4	7	0
(Canada) A Sznajder	6	6
WC	(Israel) A Naor	1	4
Q	(West Germany) J Becka	4	2
3	(Sweden) P Lundgren	6	6
8	(South Africa) D Visser	3	0
(Sweden) P Carlsson	6	6
Q	(West Germany) C Saceanu	7	4	4
(Sweden) J Windahl	6	6	6
(Brazil) N Aerts	5	6	1
WC	(Israel) S Glickstein	7	3	6
(South Africa) B Moir	2	2
2	(United States) A Krickstein	6	6

Second round
6	(Israel) A Mansdorf	6	6
LL	(South Africa) B Levine	2	1
(Canada) A Sznajder	4	6	6
3	(Sweden) P Lundgren	6	4	3
(Sweden) P Carlsson	3	6	7
(Sweden) J Windahl	6	1	6
WC	(Israel) S Glickstein	2	6	4
2	(United States) A Krickstein	6	4	6

Quarterfinals
6	(Israel) A Mansdorf	6	6
(Canada) A Sznajder	4	3
(Sweden) P Carlsson	3	4
2	(United States) A Krickstein	6	6

Semifinals
6	(Israel) A Mansdorf	3	4
2	(United States) A Krickstein	6	6
