= 1985 Nabisco Grand Prix de Verano =

- Date: 25 February – 3 March
- Edition: 17th
- Category: Grand Prix circuit
- Draw: 32S / 16D
- Prize money: $80,000
- Surface: Clay / outdoor
- Location: Buenos Aires, Argentina

Champions

Singles
- (Argentina) Martín Jaite

Doubles
- (Argentina) Martín Jaite / (Argentina) Christian Miniussi
← 1982 ·	ATP Buenos Aires	· 1986 →

The 1985 Nabisco Grand Prix de Verano, also known as the Buenos Aires Grand Prix, was a men's Nabisco Grand Prix tennis tournament held in Buenos Aires, Argentina and played on outdoor clay courts. It was the 17th edition of the tournament and was held from 25 February to 3 March 1985. Third-seeded Martín Jaite won the singles title.

== Finals ==
=== Singles ===
(Argentina) Martín Jaite defeated (Uruguay) Diego Pérez 6–4, 6–2

- It was Jaite's first singles title of his career.

=== Doubles ===
(Argentina) Martín Jaite / (Argentina) Christian Miniussi defeated (Argentina) Eduardo Bengoechea / (Uruguay) Diego Pérez 6–4, 6–3

- It was Jaite's 1st title of the year and the 1st of his career. It was Miniussi's only title of the year and the 1st of his career.

== Prize money ==
Event	W	F	SF	QF	Round of 16	Round of 32
Singles	$16,000	$8,000	$4,240	$2,280	$1,240	$680
Doubles*	$4,800	$2,400	$1,328	$832	$552	—

_{*per team}
