= 1990 Mercedes Cup – Doubles =

Doubles
- 1990 Mercedes Cup

Final
- Champions: (South Africa) Pieter Aldrich (South Africa) Danie Visser
- Runners-up: (Sweden) Per Henricsson (Sweden) Nicklas Utgren
- Score: 6–3, 6–4

Details
- Draw: 24 (2WC/1Q)
- Seeds: 8

Events
Singles	Doubles
← 1989 ·	Stuttgart Open	· 1991 →

Petr Korda and Tomáš Šmíd were the defending champions, but lost in the semifinals to Per Henricsson and Nicklas Utgren.

Pieter Aldrich and Danie Visser won the title by defeating Henricsson and Utgren 6–3, 6–4 in the final.

== Seeds ==
All seeds received a bye into the second round.

1. (South Africa) Pieter Aldrich / (South Africa) Danie Visser (champions)
2. (Spain) Sergio Casal / (Spain) Emilio Sánchez (quarterfinals)
3. (Czechoslovakia) Petr Korda / (Czechoslovakia) Tomáš Šmíd (semifinals)
4. (Argentina) Gustavo Luza / (West Germany) Udo Riglewski (second round)
5. (Socialist Federal Republic of Yugoslavia) Goran Ivanišević / (Spain) Javier Sánchez (second round)
6. (United Kingdom) Jeremy Bates / (Australia) Wally Masur (quarterfinals)
7. (United States) Charles Beckman / (United States) Luke Jensen (second round)
8. (Denmark) Michael Mortensen / (Netherlands) Tom Nijssen (second round)

== Draw ==
=== Key ===
- Q = Qualifier
- WC = Wild card
- LL = Lucky loser
- Alt = Alternate
- ITF = ITF entry
- PR = Protected ranking
- SR = Special ranking
- SE = Special exempt
- JE = Junior exempt
- JR = Junior Accelerator Programme entrant
- CO = College Accelerator Programme entrant
- NG = Next Gen Accelerator Program entrant
- w/o = Walkover
- r = Retired
- d = Defaulted

=== Finals ===
Semifinals
1	(South Africa) Pieter Aldrich (South Africa) Danie Visser	6	6
Q	(Italy) Federico Mordegan (Spain) Francisco Roig	3	4
3	(Czechoslovakia) Petr Korda (Czechoslovakia) Tomáš Šmíd	3	1
(Sweden) Per Henricsson (Sweden) Nicklas Utgren	6	6

Final
1	(South Africa) Pieter Aldrich (South Africa) Danie Visser	6	6
(Sweden) Per Henricsson (Sweden) Nicklas Utgren	3	4

=== Top half ===
First round
(Iran) M Bahrami (France) É Winogradsky	6	4
(Spain) S Bruguera (United States) J Courier	7	6
WC	(Sweden) J Gunnarsson (Sweden) M Wilander	7	1	6
(Argentina) M Jaite (Argentina) A Mancini	6	6	3
(Spain) C Costa (Spain) T Carbonell	2	6	7
(Netherlands) P Haarhuis (Argentina) G Pérez Roldán	6	3	5
Q	(Italy) F Mordegan (Spain) F Roig	6	6
(Spain) JC Báguena (Italy) S Colombo	3	3

Second round
1	(South Africa) P Aldrich (South Africa) D Visser	4	6	6
(Spain) S Bruguera (United States) J Courier	6	3	2
WC	(Sweden) J Gunnarsson (Sweden) M Wilander	3	7	6
7	(United States) C Beckman (United States) L Jensen	6	6	2
4	(Argentina) G Luza (West Germany) U Riglewski	0	5
(Spain) C Costa (Spain) T Carbonell	6	7
Q	(Italy) F Mordegan (Spain) F Roig	2	6	6
5	(Socialist Federal Republic of Yugoslavia) G Ivanišević (Spain) J Sánchez	6	3	3

Quarterfinals
1	(South Africa) P Aldrich (South Africa) D Visser	6	6
WC	(Sweden) J Gunnarsson (Sweden) M Wilander	4	2
(Spain) C Costa (Spain) T Carbonell	6	4	2
Q	(Italy) F Mordegan (Spain) F Roig	4	6	6

Semifinals
1	(South Africa) P Aldrich (South Africa) D Visser	6	6
Q	(Italy) F Mordegan (Spain) F Roig	3	4

=== Bottom half ===
First round
(Czechoslovakia) K Nováček (Hungary) B Taróczy	3	4
(Argentina) H de la Peña (Venezuela) A Mora	6	6
(Czechoslovakia) J Čihák (Czechoslovakia) C Suk	6	3	6
(Nigeria) N Odizor (Kenya) P Wekesa	2	6	1
(Sweden) P Henricsson (Sweden) N Utgren	7	6	6
(Sweden) D Engel (Czechoslovakia) D Rikl	6	7	2
(Brazil) L Mattar (Uruguay) D Pérez	6	5	2
WC	(West Germany) P Ballauff (West Germany) R Haas	3	7	6

Second round
6	(United Kingdom) J Bates (Australia) W Masur	6	6
(Argentina) H de la Peña (Venezuela) A Mora	3	4
(Czechoslovakia) J Čihák (Czechoslovakia) C Suk	7	2	6
3	(Czechoslovakia) P Korda (Czechoslovakia) T Šmíd	6	6	7
8	(Denmark) M Mortensen (Netherlands) T Nijssen	4	5
(Sweden) P Henricsson (Sweden) N Utgren	6	7
WC	(West Germany) P Ballauff (West Germany) R Haas	5	3
2	(Spain) S Casal (Spain) E Sánchez	7	6

Quarterfinals
6	(United Kingdom) J Bates (Australia) W Masur	6	6	3
3	(Czechoslovakia) P Korda (Czechoslovakia) T Šmíd	7	3	6
(Sweden) P Henricsson (Sweden) N Utgren	6	6
2	(Spain) S Casal (Spain) E Sánchez	3	4

Semifinals
3	(Czechoslovakia) P Korda (Czechoslovakia) T Šmíd	3	1
(Sweden) P Henricsson (Sweden) N Utgren	6	6
