= 1985 Geneva Open – Doubles =

Doubles
- 1985 Geneva Open

Final
- Champions: (Spain) Sergio Casal (Spain) Emilio Sánchez
- Runners-up: (Brazil) Carlos Kirmayr (Brazil) Cássio Motta
- Score: 6–4, 4–6, 7–5

Events
Singles	Doubles
← 1984 ·	Geneva Open	· 1986 →

Michael Mortensen and Mats Wilander were the defending champions, but Mortensen did not participate this year. Wilander partnered Joakim Nyström, withdrawing prior to their quarterfinal match.

Sergio Casal and Emilio Sánchez won the title, defeating Carlos Kirmayr and Cássio Motta 6–4, 4–6, 7–5 in the final.

== Seeds ==
1. (Sweden) Joakim Nyström / (Sweden) Mats Wilander (quarterfinals, withdrew)
2. (Switzerland) Heinz Günthardt / (Hungary) Balázs Taróczy (semifinals)
3. (Czechoslovakia) Pavel Složil / (Czechoslovakia) Tomáš Šmíd (first round)
4. (Spain) Sergio Casal / (Spain) Emilio Sánchez (champions)

== Draw ==
=== Key ===
- Q = Qualifier
- WC = Wild card
- LL = Lucky loser
- Alt = Alternate
- SE = Special exempt
- PR = Protected ranking
- ITF = ITF entry
- JE = Junior exempt
- w/o = Walkover
- r = Retired
- d = Defaulted
- SR = Special ranking

=== Draw ===
First round
1	(Sweden) J Nyström (Sweden) M Wilander	6	6
(Argentina) E Bengoechea (Argentina) M Jaite	2	2
(Peru) P Arraya (Mexico) L Lavalle	4	5
(West Germany) D Keretić (Sweden) P Svensson	6	7
4	(Spain) S Casal (Spain) E Sánchez	5	6	6
(France) G Forget (Czechoslovakia) J Navrátil	7	2	1
(Switzerland) M Günthardt (Hungary) Z Kuharszky	7	1	6
(France) H Leconte (United States) B Scanlon	5	6	4
(Switzerland) J Hlasek (South Africa) M Robertson	5	4
(Czechoslovakia) S Birner (Nigeria) T Mmoh	7	6
(Brazil) C Kirmayr (Brazil) C Motta	7	6
3	(Czechoslovakia) P Složil (Czechoslovakia) T Šmíd	6	3
(United States) T Gullikson (United States) S Meister	6	6
(Spain) Ricardo Sánchez-Rueda (Spain) JA Rodríguez	3	3
(Switzerland) R Hertzog (Switzerland) Richard Farda	6	3
2	(Switzerland) H Günthardt (Hungary) B Taróczy	7	6

Quarterfinals
1	(Sweden) J Nyström (Sweden) M Wilander
(West Germany) D Keretić (Sweden) P Svensson	w/o
4	(Spain) S Casal (Spain) E Sánchez	6	7
(Switzerland) M Günthardt (Hungary) Z Kuharszky	3	5
(Czechoslovakia) S Birner (Nigeria) T Mmoh	7	4	5
(Brazil) C Kirmayr (Brazil) C Motta	5	6	7
(United States) T Gullikson (United States) S Meister	6	7	2
2	(Switzerland) H Günthardt (Hungary) B Taróczy	7	6	6

Semifinals
(West Germany) D Keretić (Sweden) P Svensson	3	6
4	(Spain) S Casal (Spain) E Sánchez	6	7
(Brazil) C Kirmayr (Brazil) C Motta	7	5	6
2	(Switzerland) H Günthardt (Hungary) B Taróczy	5	7	4

Final
4	(Spain) S Casal (Spain) E Sánchez	6	4	7
(Brazil) C Kirmayr (Brazil) C Motta	4	6	5
