= 1985 Geneva Open – Singles =

Singles
- 1985 Geneva Open

Final
- Champion: (Czechoslovakia) Tomáš Šmíd
- Runner-up: (Sweden) Mats Wilander
- Score: 6–4, 6–4

Details
- Draw: 32
- Seeds: 8

Events
Singles	Doubles
← 1984 ·	Geneva Open	· 1986 →

Aaron Krickstein was the defending champion but lost in the second round this year.

Tomáš Šmíd won the title, defeating Mats Wilander 6–4, 6–4 in the final.

== Seeds ==
1. (Sweden) Mats Wilander (final)
2. (Sweden) Joakim Nyström (second round, withdrew)
3. (Czechoslovakia) Tomáš Šmíd (champion)
4. (Argentina) Martín Jaite (first round)
5. (United States) Aaron Krickstein (second round)
6. (France) Henri Leconte (semifinals)
7. (Switzerland) Heinz Günthardt (second round)
8. (Switzerland) Jakob Hlasek (quarterfinals)

== Draw ==
=== Key ===
- Q = Qualifier
- WC = Wild card
- LL = Lucky loser
- Alt = Alternate
- SE = Special exempt
- PR = Protected ranking
- ITF = ITF entry
- JE = Junior exempt
- w/o = Walkover
- r = Retired
- d = Defaulted
- SR = Special ranking

=== Finals ===
Semifinals
1	(Sweden) Mats Wilander	3	6	6
6	(France) Henri Leconte	6	3	1
3	(Czechoslovakia) Tomáš Šmíd	7	6
(Spain) Juan Aguilera	5	4

Final
1	(Sweden) Mats Wilander	4	4
3	(Czechoslovakia) Tomáš Šmíd	6	6

=== Top half ===
First round
1	(Sweden) M Wilander	4	6	6
(Argentina) A Ganzábal	6	2	2
(West Germany) D Keretić	1	6	6
Q	(Soviet Union) A Zverev	6	3	7
(Czechoslovakia) P Složil	6	6
Q	(Soviet Union) A Võsand	4	4
WC	(Switzerland) Christoph Meyer	2	6
8	(Switzerland) J Hlasek	6	7
4	(Argentina) M Jaite	7	4	5
(Czechoslovakia) M Vajda	6	6	7
(Sweden) K Carlsson	6	6
(France) G Forget	4	4
Q	(Soviet Union) A Chesnokov	6	6
(Peru) P Arraya	0	4
(Spain) S Casal	3	3
6	(France) H Leconte	6	6

Second round
1	(Sweden) M Wilander	6	6
Q	(Soviet Union) A Zverev	2	3
(Czechoslovakia) P Složil	6	7	4
8	(Switzerland) J Hlasek	7	6	6
(Czechoslovakia) M Vajda	1	6	7
(Sweden) K Carlsson	6	2	5
Q	(Soviet Union) A Chesnokov	2	6	2
6	(France) H Leconte	6	4	6

Quarterfinals
1	(Sweden) M Wilander	7	6
8	(Switzerland) J Hlasek	5	4
(Czechoslovakia) M Vajda	5	1
6	(France) H Leconte	7	6

Semifinals
1	(Sweden) M Wilander	3	6	6
6	(France) H Leconte	6	3	1

=== Bottom half ===
First round
5	(United States) A Krickstein	6	6
WC	(Switzerland) Thierry Grin	1	3
(Spain) J Lópe-Maeso	2	1
(Argentina) R Argüello	6	6
(Argentina) M Ingaramo	6	6
(Argentina) H de la Peña	3	3
(Czechoslovakia) J Navrátil	6	3	2
3	(Czechoslovakia) T Šmíd	2	6	6
7	(Switzerland) H Günthardt	6	6	6
(United States) B Scanlon	2	7	1
Q	(Spain) JA Rodríguez	6	3	0
WC	(Mexico) L Lavalle	4	6	6
(Hungary) B Taróczy	6	5	2
(Spain) J Aguilera	2	7	6
(Argentina) E Bengoechea	4	3
2	(Sweden) J Nyström	6	6

Second round
5	(United States) A Krickstein	4	4
(Argentina) R Argüello	6	6
(Argentina) M Ingaramo	1	3
3	(Czechoslovakia) T Šmíd	6	6
7	(Switzerland) H Günthardt	4	3
WC	(Mexico) L Lavalle	6	6
(Spain) J Aguilera	w/o
2	(Sweden) J Nyström

Quarterfinals
(Argentina) R Argüello	2	2
3	(Czechoslovakia) T Šmíd	6	6
WC	(Mexico) L Lavalle	5	1
(Spain) J Aguilera	7	6

Semifinals
3	(Czechoslovakia) T Šmíd	7	6
(Spain) J Aguilera	5	4
