= 1986 Tel Aviv Open – Doubles =

Doubles
- 1986 Tel Aviv Open

Final
- Champions: (United States) John Letts (Sweden) Peter Lundgren
- Runners-up: (South Africa) Christo Steyn (South Africa) Danie Visser
- Score: 6–3, 3–6, 6–3

Details
- Draw: 16
- Seeds: 4

Events
Singles	Doubles
- Tel Aviv Open

Brad Gilbert and Ilie Năstase were the defending champions, but Năstase did not participate this year. Gilbert partnered Shlomo Glickstein, losing in the first round.

John Letts and Peter Lundgren won the title, defeating Christo Steyn and Danie Visser 6–3, 3–6, 6–3 in the final.

== Seeds ==
1. (South Africa) Christo Steyn / (South Africa) Danie Visser (final)
2. (New Zealand) Kelly Evernden / (United States) Chip Hooper (quarterfinals)
3. (South Africa) Eddie Edwards / (South Africa) Gary Muller (quarterfinals)
4. (United States) Charles Bud Cox / (United States) Mark Dickson (quarterfinals)

== Draw ==
Key

- Q = Qualifier
- WC = Wild card
- LL = Lucky loser
- Alt = Alternate
- ITF = ITF entry
- PR = Protected ranking
- SR = Special ranking
- SE = Special exempt
- JE = Junior exempt
- JR = Junior Accelerator Programme entrant
- CO = College Accelerator Programme entrant
- NG = Next Gen Accelerator Program entrant
- w/o = Walkover
- r = Retired
- d = Defaulted

=== Draw ===
First round
1	(South Africa) C Steyn (South Africa) D Visser	6	7
(Israel) G Bloom (West Germany) P Moraing	3	6
(Sweden) P Carlsson (Sweden) P Svensson	3	6	1
(Israel) A Mansdorf (Israel) S Perkiss	6	3	6
3	(South Africa) E Edwards (South Africa) G Muller	6	7
WC	(United States) J Berger (United States) A Krickstein	1	5
(Sweden) R Båthman (Sweden) J Windahl	7	6
(United States) B Green (South Africa) B Levine	5	4
(United States) B Gilbert (Israel) S Glickstein	6	1	4
(United States) J Letts (Sweden) P Lundgren	2	6	6
(United States) J Gurfein (Sweden) P Hjertquist	6	4	4
4	(United States) CB Cox (United States) M Dickson	3	6	6
(Netherlands) M Oosting (Sweden) S Svensson	7	3	6
(Brazil) N Aerts (Brazil) J Góes	6	6	3
(South Africa) B Moir (Canada) A Sznajder	2	2
2	(New Zealand) K Evernden (United States) C Hooper	6	6

Quarterfinals
1	(South Africa) C Steyn (South Africa) D Visser	6	7
(Israel) A Mansdorf (Israel) S Perkiss	3	5
3	(South Africa) E Edwards (South Africa) G Muller	4	4
(Sweden) R Båthman (Sweden) J Windahl	6	6
(United States) J Letts (Sweden) P Lundgren	7	7
4	(United States) CB Cox (United States) M Dickson	5	6
(Netherlands) M Oosting (Sweden) S Svensson	6	6
2	(New Zealand) K Evernden (United States) C Hooper	4	4

Semifinals
1	(South Africa) C Steyn (South Africa) D Visser	6	6
(Sweden) R Båthman (Sweden) J Windahl	1	4
(United States) J Letts (Sweden) P Lundgren	6	6
(Netherlands) M Oosting (Sweden) S Svensson	4	4

Final
1	(South Africa) C Steyn (South Africa) D Visser	3	6	3
(United States) J Letts (Sweden) P Lundgren	6	3	6
