= 1986 Athens Open – Singles =

1986 tennis tournament

Singles
- 1986 Athens Open

Final
- Champion: (Sweden) Henrik Sundström
- Runner-up: (Mexico) Francisco Maciel
- Score: 6–0, 7–5

Details
- Draw: 32
- Seeds: 8

Events
Singles	Doubles
ATP Athens Open	· 1987 →

This was the first edition of the event.

Henrik Sundström won the tournament, beating Francisco Maciel in the final, 6–0, 7–5.

== Seeds ==
1. (Uruguay) Diego Pérez (first round)
2. (Czechoslovakia) Libor Pimek (second round)
3. (Mexico) Francisco Maciel (final)
4. (Peru) Pablo Arraya (semifinals)
5. (Spain) Fernando Luna (quarterfinals)
6. (Socialist Federal Republic of Yugoslavia) Bruno Orešar (quarterfinals)
7. (West Germany) Michael Westphal (first round)
8. (Romania) Florin Segărceanu (first round)

== Draw ==
=== Key ===
- Q = Qualifier
- WC = Wild card
- LL = Lucky loser
- Alt = Alternate
- SE = Special exempt
- PR = Protected ranking
- ITF = ITF entry
- JE = Junior exempt
- w/o = Walkover
- r = Retired
- d = Defaulted
- SR = Special ranking

=== Finals ===
Semifinals
(Spain) Juan Avendaño	0	1
3	(Mexico) Francisco Maciel	6	6
4	(Peru) Pablo Arraya	2	3
(Sweden) Henrik Sundström	6	6

Final
3	(Mexico) Francisco Maciel	0	5
(Sweden) Henrik Sundström	6	7

=== Top half ===
First round
1	(Uruguay) D Pérez	3	0
(Spain) J Avendaño	6	6
WC	(Italy) F Cancellotti	6	6
(Spain) JA Rodríguez	3	2
(Sweden) J Carlsson	3	0
(Italy) C Panatta	6	6
(Spain) J Arrese	6	6
8	(Romania) F Segărceanu	4	4
3	(Mexico) F Maciel	6	6
(Argentina) G Rivas	1	2
(Brazil) C Kist	6	6	6
Q	(Spain) J López-Maeso	7	4	3
Q	(Argentina) F Davín	6	7
(Belgium) E Masso	3	6
(Canada) M Wostenholme	4	3
5	(Spain) F Luna	6	6

Second round
(Spain) J Avendaño	6	4	6
WC	(Italy) F Cancellotti	4	6	3
(Italy) C Panatta	7	4	7
(Spain) J Arrese	5	6	6
3	(Mexico) F Maciel	6	6
(Brazil) C Kist	2	4
Q	(Argentina) F Davín	6	1	0
5	(Spain) F Luna	2	6	6

Quarterfinals
(Spain) J Avendaño	6	6
(Italy) C Panatta	3	1
3	(Mexico) F Maciel	7	6
5	(Spain) F Luna	6	1

Semifinals
(Spain) J Avendaño	0	1
3	(Mexico) F Maciel	6	6

=== Bottom half ===
First round
6	(Socialist Federal Republic of Yugoslavia) B Orešar	6	6
(West Germany) A Stepanek	2	1
WC	(Greece) A Bavelas	4	7	3
(United States) B Willenborg	6	5	6
Q	(France) B Dadillon	5	6	6
(Peru) C di Laura	7	4	4
Q	(Argentina) G Pérez Roldán	6	4	3
4	(Peru) P Arraya	2	6	6
7	(West Germany) M Westphal	4	3
WC	(Greece) G Kalovelonis	6	6
(Chile) P Rebolledo	6	7
(Spain) J Aguilera	4	5
(Sweden) H Sundström	6	2	7
(Sweden) R Båthman	3	6	5
(Switzerland) C Mezzadri	3	1
2	(Czechoslovakia) L Pimek	6	6

Second round
6	(Socialist Federal Republic of Yugoslavia) B Orešar	7	6
(United States) B Willenborg	6	1
Q	(France) B Dadillon	6	2
4	(Peru) P Arraya	7	6
WC	(Greece) G Kalovelonis	6	6	6
(Chile) P Rebolledo	1	7	7
(Sweden) H Sundström	6	6
2	(Czechoslovakia) L Pimek	0	1

Quarterfinals
6	(Socialist Federal Republic of Yugoslavia) B Orešar	4	3
4	(Peru) P Arraya	6	6
(Chile) P Rebolledo	0	6	3
(Sweden) H Sundström	6	4	6

Semifinals
4	(Peru) P Arraya	2	3
(Sweden) H Sundström	6	6
