= 1991 Mercedes Cup – Doubles =

Doubles
- 1991 Mercedes Cup

Final
- Champions: (Australia) Wally Masur (Spain) Emilio Sánchez
- Runners-up: (Italy) Omar Camporese (Socialist Federal Republic of Yugoslavia) Goran Ivanišević
- Score: 4–6, 6–3, 6–4

Details
- Draw: 24 (1WC/1Q)
- Seeds: 8

Events
Singles	Doubles
← 1990 ·	Stuttgart Open	· 1992 →

Pieter Aldrich and Danie Visser were the defending champions, but Aldrich did not compete this year. Visser teamed up with Gary Muller and lost in the quarterfinals to Nick Brown and Richard Vogel.

Wally Masur and Emilio Sánchez won the title by defeating Omar Camporese and Goran Ivanišević 4–6, 6–3, 6–4 in the final.

== Seeds ==
All seeds received a bye to the second round.

1. (South Africa) Gary Muller / (South Africa) Danie Visser (quarterfinals)
2. (United States) Luke Jensen / (Australia) Laurie Warder (quarterfinals)
3. (United Kingdom) Neil Broad / (South Africa) Piet Norval (quarterfinals)
4. (Germany) Udo Riglewski / (Germany) Michael Stich (quarterfinals)
5. (Netherlands) Paul Haarhuis / (Netherlands) Mark Koevermans (semifinals)
6. (Italy) Omar Camporese / (Socialist Federal Republic of Yugoslavia) Goran Ivanišević (final)
7. (Australia) Wally Masur / (Spain) Emilio Sánchez (champions)
8. (United States) Kevin Curren / (South Africa) Stefan Kruger (second round)

== Draw ==
=== Key ===
- Q = Qualifier
- WC = Wild card
- LL = Lucky loser
- Alt = Alternate
- ITF = ITF entry
- PR = Protected ranking
- SR = Special ranking
- SE = Special exempt
- JE = Junior exempt
- JR = Junior Accelerator Programme entrant
- CO = College Accelerator Programme entrant
- NG = Next Gen Accelerator Program entrant
- w/o = Walkover
- r = Retired
- d = Defaulted

=== Finals ===
Semifinals
(United Kingdom) Nick Brown (Czechoslovakia) Richard Vogel	2	6
6	(Italy) Omar Camporese (Socialist Federal Republic of Yugoslavia) Goran Ivanišević	6	7
5	(Netherlands) Paul Haarhuis (Netherlands) Mark Koevermans	5	3
7	(Australia) Wally Masur (Spain) Emilio Sánchez	7	6

Final
6	(Italy) Omar Camporese (Socialist Federal Republic of Yugoslavia) Goran Ivanišević	6	3	4
7	(Australia) Wally Masur (Spain) Emilio Sánchez	4	6	6

=== Top half ===
First round
(Czechoslovakia) K Nováček (Czechoslovakia) D Vacek	6	6	6
(Venezuela) A Mora (The Bahamas) R Smith	4	7	7
(United Kingdom) N Brown (Czechoslovakia) R Vogel	6	3	6
(Spain) F Clavet (Argentina) H de la Peña	3	6	3
(Sweden) R Båthman (Sweden) R Bergh	4	5
(Spain) J Sánchez (France) É Winogradsky	6	7
(Iran) M Bahrami (France) R Gilbert	4	4
(Ecuador) A Gómez (Uruguay) D Pérez	6	6

Second round
1	(South Africa) G Muller (South Africa) D Visser	7	6
(Venezuela) A Mora (The Bahamas) R Smith	6	4
(United Kingdom) N Brown (Czechoslovakia) R Vogel	6	6
8	(United States) K Curren (South Africa) S Kruger	4	3
3	(United Kingdom) N Broad (South Africa) P Norval	6	7
(Spain) J Sánchez (France) É Winogradsky	1	6
(Ecuador) A Gómez (Uruguay) D Pérez	4	3
6	(Italy) O Camporese (Socialist Federal Republic of Yugoslavia) G Ivanišević	6	6

Quarterfinals
1	(South Africa) G Muller (South Africa) D Visser	7	6	5
(United Kingdom) N Brown (Czechoslovakia) R Vogel	6	7	7
3	(United Kingdom) N Broad (South Africa) P Norval	5	4
6	(Italy) O Camporese (Socialist Federal Republic of Yugoslavia) G Ivanišević	7	6

Semifinals
(United Kingdom) N Brown (Czechoslovakia) R Vogel	2	6
6	(Italy) O Camporese (Socialist Federal Republic of Yugoslavia) G Ivanišević	6	7

=== Bottom half ===
First round
WC	(Germany) E Jelen (Germany) CU Steeb	6	7	1
Q	(Latvia) Ģ Dzelde (Ukraine) D Poliakov	7	6	6
(Netherlands) R Krajicek (Netherlands) J Siemerink	6	6
(Netherlands) T Nijssen (Czech Republic) C Suk	2	3
(Argentina) G Luza (Brazil) C Motta	6	2
(Netherlands) HJ Davids (Belgium) L Pimek	7	6
(United States) S Cannon (Sweden) L Jönsson	6	3
(Czechoslovakia) V Flégl (Socialist Federal Republic of Yugoslavia) G Prpić	7	6

Second round
5	(Netherlands) P Haarhuis (Netherlands) M Koevermans	6	6
Q	(Latvia) Ģ Dzelde (Ukraine) D Poliakov	2	4
(Netherlands) R Krajicek (Netherlands) J Siemerink	4	4
4	(Germany) U Riglewski (Germany) M Stich	6	6
7	(Australia) W Masur (Spain) E Sánchez	2	6	6
(Netherlands) HJ Davids (Belgium) L Pimek	6	3	4
(Czechoslovakia) V Flégl (Socialist Federal Republic of Yugoslavia) G Prpić	7	4	4
2	(United States) L Jensen (Australia) L Warder	6	6	6

Quarterfinals
5	(Netherlands) P Haarhuis (Netherlands) M Koevermans	6	6	6
4	(Germany) U Riglewski (Germany) M Stich	7	4	3
7	(Australia) W Masur (Spain) E Sánchez	6	6
2	(United States) L Jensen (Australia) L Warder	3	2

Semifinals
5	(Netherlands) P Haarhuis (Netherlands) M Koevermans	5	3
7	(Australia) W Masur (Spain) E Sánchez	7	6
