= 1986 Athens Open – Doubles =

Tennis tournament

Doubles
- 1986 Athens Open

Final
- Champions: (Czechoslovakia) Libor Pimek (United States) Blaine Willenborg
- Runners-up: (Peru) Carlos di Laura (Italy) Claudio Panatta
- Score: 5–7, 6–4, 6–2

Details
- Draw: 16
- Seeds: 4

Events
Singles	Doubles
- ATP Athens Open

This was the first edition of the event.

Libor Pimek and Blaine Willenborg won in the final 5–7, 6–4, 6–2, against Carlos di Laura and Claudio Panatta.

== Seeds ==
1. (Czechoslovakia) Libor Pimek / (United States) Blaine Willenborg (champions)
2. (Sweden) Ronnie Båthman / (Sweden) Johan Carlsson (first round)
3. (Peru) Carlos di Laura / (Italy) Claudio Panatta (final)
4. (Spain) Jordi Arrese / (Belgium) Eduardo Masso (quarterfinals)

== Draw ==
Key

- Q = Qualifier
- WC = Wild card
- LL = Lucky loser
- Alt = Alternate
- ITF = ITF entry
- PR = Protected ranking
- SR = Special ranking
- SE = Special exempt
- JE = Junior exempt
- JR = Junior Accelerator Programme entrant
- CO = College Accelerator Programme entrant
- NG = Next Gen Accelerator Program entrant
- w/o = Walkover
- r = Retired
- d = Defaulted

=== Draw ===
First round
1	(Czechoslovakia) L Pimek (United States) B Willenborg	7	6
(Brazil) M Hennemann (Brazil) C Kist	5	4
(Argentina) F Davín (Argentina) G Pérez Roldán	3	3
(Switzerland) C Mezzadri (Romania) F Segărceanu	6	6
4	(Spain) J Arrese (Belgium) E Masso	6	3	6
(Peru) P Arraya (Canada) M Wostenholme	1	6	2
(France) B Dadillon (Spain) G Urpí	4	6	3
(Spain) J Clavet (Spain) JA Rodríguez	6	4	6
(Spain) J Avendaño (West Germany) M Westphal	6
(Uruguay) D Pérez (Chile) P Rebolledo	3^{r}
(Italy) L Bottazzi (Italy) F Cancellotti	3	6	3
3	(Peru) C di Laura (Italy) C Panatta	6	4	6
(Socialist Federal Republic of Yugoslavia) B Orešar (Argentina) G Rivas	4	2
(Spain) J López-Maeso (Spain) A Tous	6	6
WC	(Greece) A Bavelas (Greece) G Kalovelonis	6	6
2	(Sweden) R Båthman (Sweden) J Carlsson	2	4

Quarterfinals
1	(Czechoslovakia) L Pimek (United States) B Willenborg	6	6
(Switzerland) C Mezzadri (Romania) F Segărceanu	3	4
4	(Spain) J Arrese (Belgium) E Masso	4	3
(Spain) J Clavet (Spain) JA Rodríguez	6	6
(Spain) J Avendaño (West Germany) M Westphal	2	6	2
3	(Peru) C di Laura (Italy) C Panatta	6	4	6
(Spain) J López-Maeso (Spain) A Tous	6	6
WC	(Greece) A Bavelas (Greece) G Kalovelonis	3	2

Semifinals
1	(Czechoslovakia) L Pimek (United States) B Willenborg	6	4	7
(Spain) J Clavet (Spain) JA Rodríguez	0	6	5
3	(Peru) C di Laura (Italy) C Panatta	6	6
(Spain) J López-Maeso (Spain) A Tous	4	1

Final
1	(Czechoslovakia) L Pimek (United States) B Willenborg	5	6	6
3	(Peru) C di Laura (Italy) C Panatta	7	4	2
