= 1989 Mercedes Cup =

- Date: 24–30 July
- Edition: 12th
- Category: Grand Prix
- Draw: 48S / 24D
- Prize money: $275,000
- Surface: Clay / outdoor
- Location: Stuttgart, West Germany
- Venue: Tennis Club Weissenhof

Champions

Singles
- (Argentina) Martín Jaite

Doubles
- (Czechoslovakia) Petr Korda / (Czechoslovakia) Tomáš Šmíd
- Stuttgart Open

The 1989 Mercedes Cup, was a men's tennis tournament played on outdoor clay courts and held at the Tennis Club Weissenhof in Stuttgart, West Germany that was part of the 1989 Grand Prix circuit. It was the 12th edition of the tournament was held from 24 July until 30 July 1989. Fourteenth-seeded Martín Jaite won the singles title.

== Finals ==
=== Singles ===
(Argentina) Martín Jaite defeated (Socialist Federal Republic of Yugoslavia) Goran Prpić, 6–3, 6–2

- It was Jaite's 1st singles title of the year and the 6th of his career.

=== Doubles ===
(Czechoslovakia) Petr Korda / (Czechoslovakia) Tomáš Šmíd defeated (Romania) Florin Segărceanu / (Czechoslovakia) Cyril Suk, 6–3, 6–4
