= 1991 Mercedes Cup – Singles =

Singles
- 1991 Mercedes Cup

Final
- Champion: (Germany) Michael Stich
- Runner-up: (Argentina) Alberto Mancini
- Score: 1–6, 7–6^{(11–9)}, 6–4, 6–2

Details
- Draw: 48 (4WC/6Q/1LL)
- Seeds: 16

Events
Singles	Doubles
- Stuttgart Open

Goran Ivanišević was the defending champion, but lost in the second round to Andrés Gómez.

First-seeded Michael Stich won the title by defeating Alberto Mancini 1–6, 7–6^{(11–9)}, 6–4, 6–2 in the final.

== Seeds ==
All seeds received a bye to the second round.

1. (Germany) Michael Stich (champion)
2. (France) Guy Forget (third round)
3. (Spain) Emilio Sánchez (second round)
4. (Socialist Federal Republic of Yugoslavia) Goran Ivanišević (second round)
5. (Soviet Union) Andrei Cherkasov (second round)
6. (Czechoslovakia) Karel Nováček (second round)
7. (Socialist Federal Republic of Yugoslavia) Goran Prpić (quarterfinals)
8. (Sweden) Magnus Gustafsson (second round)
9. (Austria) Horst Skoff (third round)
10. (Sweden) Jonas Svensson (second round)
11. (Argentina) Guillermo Pérez Roldán (third round)
12. (Soviet Union) Alexander Volkov (third round)
13. (Italy) Omar Camporese (second round)
14. (Haiti) Ronald Agénor (third round)
15. (Argentina) Martín Jaite (second round)
16. (Spain) Jordi Arrese (second round)

== Draw ==
Key

- Q = Qualifier
- WC = Wild card
- LL = Lucky loser
- Alt = Alternate
- ITF = ITF entry
- PR = Protected ranking
- SR = Special ranking
- SE = Special exempt
- JE = Junior exempt
- JR = Junior Accelerator Programme entrant
- CO = College Accelerator Programme entrant
- NG = Next Gen Accelerator Program entrant
- w/o = Walkover
- r = Retired
- d = Defaulted

=== Finals ===
Quarterfinals
1	(Germany) Michael Stich	6	3	7^{7}
(Netherlands) Richard Krajicek	4	6	6^{2}
(Spain) Francisco Clavet	6	6^{3}	6
Q	(France) Cédric Pioline	3	7^{7}	1
(Argentina) Alberto Mancini	6	6
Q	(Spain) Germán López	3	3
7	(Socialist Federal Republic of Yugoslavia) Goran Prpić	2	6	5
Q	(Germany) Lars Koslowski	6	2	7

Semifinals
1	(Germany) Michael Stich	6	6
(Spain) Francisco Clavet	4	2
(Argentina) Alberto Mancini	4	6	6
Q	(Germany) Lars Koslowski	6	1	3

Final
1	(Germany) Michael Stich	1	7^{11}	6	6
(Argentina) Alberto Mancini	6	6^{9}	4	2

=== Top half ===
==== Section 1 ====
First round
WC	(Germany) U Riglewski	0	1
(France) F Santoro	6	6
(Sweden) M Larsson	3	0
(Spain) J Sánchez	6	6
(United States) K Curren	4	4
(Argentina) H de la Peña	6	6
(Argentina) F Davín	2	4
(Netherlands) R Krajicek	6	6

Second round
1	(Germany) M Stich	6	7^{7}
(France) F Santoro	3	6^{3}
(Spain) J Sánchez	4	6	6
16	(Spain) J Arrese	6	1	4
9	(Austria) H Skoff	6	6
(Argentina) H de la Peña	0	3
(Netherlands) R Krajicek	7^{7}	5	7^{7}
8	(Sweden) M Gustafsson	6^{2}	7	6^{0}

Third round
1	(Germany) M Stich	6	6
(Spain) J Sánchez	3	3
9	(Austria) H Skoff	3	4
(Netherlands) R Krajicek	6	6

Quarterfinals
1	(Germany) M Stich	6	3	7^{7}
(Netherlands) R Krajicek	4	6	6^{2}

==== Section 2 ====
First round
(Italy) R Furlan	6	2	1
(Ecuador) A Gómez	4	6	6
(Austria) T Muster	1	3
(Spain) F Clavet	6	6
Q	(Germany) J Wöhrmann	7^{7}	4	6
(Netherlands) J Siemerink	6^{4}	6	3
Q	(France) C Pioline	6	6
WC	(France) Y Noah	3	2

Second round
4	(Socialist Federal Republic of Yugoslavia) G Ivanišević	6	3	6^{3}
(Ecuador) A Gómez	4	6	7^{7}
(Spain) F Clavet	7	6
13	(Italy) O Camporese	5	0
12	(Soviet Union) A Volkov	6	6
Q	(Germany) J Wöhrmann	2	3
Q	(France) C Pioline	6	1	6
6	(Czechoslovakia) K Nováček	1	6	3

Third round
(Ecuador) A Gómez	3	3
(Spain) F Clavet	6	6
12	(Soviet Union) A Volkov	2	6	3
Q	(France) C Pioline	6	4	6

Quarterfinals
(Spain) F Clavet	6	6^{3}	6
Q	(France) C Pioline	3	7^{7}	1

=== Bottom half ===
==== Section 3 ====
First round
(Argentina) A Mancini	6	6
(Netherlands) P Haarhuis	4	2
(Netherlands) M Koevermans	3	7^{7}	0
Q	(Spain) C Costa	6	6^{1}	6
Q	(Germany) M Naewie	2	4
(Switzerland) M Rosset	6	6
Q	(Spain) G López	6^{5}	6	6
WC	(France) T Champion	7^{7}	3	2

Second round
5	(Soviet Union) A Cherkasov	6	4	2
(Argentina) A Mancini	4	6	6
Q	(Spain) C Costa	3	2
11	(Argentina) G Pérez Roldán	6	6
14	(Haiti) R Agénor	6	3	6
(Switzerland) M Rosset	1	6	3
Q	(Spain) G López	7^{7}	7^{13}
3	(Spain) E Sánchez	6^{4}	6^{11}

Third round
(Argentina) A Mancini	7	6
11	(Argentina) G Pérez Roldán	5	2
14	(Haiti) R Agénor	2	3
Q	(Spain) G López	6	6

Quarterfinals
(Argentina) A Mancini	6	6
Q	(Spain) G López	3	3

==== Section 4 ====
First round
(Uruguay) M Filippini	6	4	7
(Sweden) N Kulti	2	6	5
(Germany) E Jelen	0	6	6
WC	(Germany) CU Steeb	6	3	2
LL	(Spain) F Roig	6^{0}	6^{2}
Q	(Germany) L Koslowski	7^{7}	7^{7}
(Czechoslovakia) M Vajda	6	3	3
(Australia) W Masur	4	6	6

Second round
7	(Socialist Federal Republic of Yugoslavia) G Prpić	7^{7}	6
(Uruguay) M Filippini	6^{3}	2
(Germany) E Jelen	7^{7}	6
10	(Sweden) J Svensson	6^{3}	1
15	(Argentina) M Jaite	3	4
Q	(Germany) L Koslowski	6	6
(Australia) W Masur	7	6^{3}	6^{7}
2	(France) G Forget	5	7^{7}	7^{9}

Third round
7	(Socialist Federal Republic of Yugoslavia) G Prpić	6	2	6
(Germany) E Jelen	3	6	2
Q	(Germany) L Koslowski	7^{7}	7^{11}
2	(France) G Forget	6^{5}	6^{9}

Quarterfinals
7	(Socialist Federal Republic of Yugoslavia) G Prpić	2	6	5
Q	(Germany) L Koslowski	6	2	7
