= 1986 Athens Open =

- Date: 16–23 June
- Edition: 1st
- Category: Grand Prix
- Draw: 32S / 16D
- Prize money: $100,000
- Surface: Clay / outdoor
- Location: Athens, Greece

Champions

Singles
- (Sweden) Henrik Sundström

Doubles
- (Belgium) Libor Pimek / (United States) Blaine Willenborg
- ATP Athens Open

The 1986 Athens International was a men's tennis tournament played on outdoor clay courts in Athens in Greece that was part of the 1986 Nabisco Grand Prix. It was the inaugural edition and was held from 16 June until 23 June 1986. Henrik Sundström won the singles title.

== Finals ==
=== Singles ===
(Sweden) Henrik Sundström defeated (Mexico) Francisco Maciel 6–0, 7–5

- It was Sundström's only title of the year and the 5th of his career.

=== Doubles ===
(Belgium) Libor Pimek / (United States) Blaine Willenborg defeated (Peru) Carlos di Laura / (Italy) Claudio Panatta 5–7, 6–4, 6–2

- It was Pimek's 2nd title of the year and the 6th of his career. It was Willenborg's only title of the year and the 5th of his career.

== See also ==
- 1986 Athens Trophy – women's tournament
