= 1985 Geneva Open =

- Date: 16–23 September
- Edition: 6th
- Category: Grand Prix
- Draw: 32S / 16D
- Prize money: $100,000
- Surface: Clay / outdoor
- Location: Geneva, Switzerland

Champions

Singles
- (Czechoslovakia) Tomáš Šmíd

Doubles
- (Spain) Sergio Casal / (Spain) Emilio Sánchez
- Geneva Open

The 1985 Geneva Open was a men's tennis tournament played on outdoor clay courts that was part of the 1985 Nabisco Grand Prix. It was played at Geneva, Switzerland from 16 September through 23 September 1985. Third-seeded Tomáš Šmíd won the singles title.

== Finals ==
=== Singles ===
(Czechoslovakia) Tomáš Šmíd defeated (Sweden) Mats Wilander 6–4, 6–4

- It was Šmíd's 6th title of the year and the 46th of his career.

=== Doubles ===
(Spain) Sergio Casal / (Spain) Emilio Sánchez defeated (Brazil) Carlos Kirmayr / (Brazil) Cássio Motta 6–4, 4–6, 7–5

- It was Casal's 3rd title of the year and the 3rd of his career. It was Sánchez's 2nd title of the year and the 2nd of his career.
