= 1990 Mercedes Cup =

- Date: 16–22 July
- Edition: 13th
- Category: Championship Series
- Draw: 48S / 24D
- Prize money: $825,000
- Surface: Clay / outdoor
- Location: Stuttgart, West Germany
- Venue: Tennis Club Weissenhof

Champions

Singles
- (Socialist Federal Republic of Yugoslavia) Goran Ivanišević

Doubles
- (South Africa) Pieter Aldrich / (South Africa) Danie Visser
- Stuttgart Open

The 1990 Mercedes Cup, was a men's tennis tournament played on outdoor clay courts and held at the Tennis Club Weissenhof in Stuttgart, West Germany that was part of the Championship Series of the 1990 ATP Tour. It was the 13th edition of the tournament was held from 16 July until 22 July 1990. Tenth-seeded Goran Ivanišević won the singles title.

== Finals ==
=== Singles ===
(Socialist Federal Republic of Yugoslavia) Goran Ivanišević defeated (Argentina) Guillermo Pérez Roldán, 6–7^{(2–7)}, 6–1, 6–4, 7–6^{(7–5)}

- It was Ivanišević' first singles title of his career.

=== Doubles ===
(South Africa) Pieter Aldrich / (South Africa) Danie Visser defeated (Sweden) Per Henricsson / (Sweden) Nicklas Utgren, 6–3, 6–4
