= 1986 Copa Banco Galicia =

- Date: 10–17 November
- Edition: 18th
- Category: Grand Prix
- Draw: 32S / 16D
- Prize money: $85,000
- Surface: Clay / outdoor
- Location: Buenos Aires, Argentina

Champions

Singles
- (United States) Jay Berger

Doubles
- (France) Loïc Courteau / (Austria) Horst Skoff
- Copa Banco Galicia

The 1986 Copa Banco Galicia was a men's tennis tournament held in Buenos Aires, Argentina that was part of the 1986 Nabisco Grand Prix. The tournament was held from 10 November through 17 November 1986. Unseeded Jay Berger won the singles title.

== Finals ==
=== Singles ===
(United States) Jay Berger defeated (Argentina) Franco Davín 6–3, 6–3

- It was Berger's only title of the year and the 1st of his career.

=== Doubles ===
(France) Loïc Courteau / (Austria) Horst Skoff defeated (Argentina) Gustavo Luza / (Argentina) Gustavo Tiberti 3–6, 6–4, 6–3

- It was Courteau's only title of the year and the 1st of his career. It was Skoff's only title of the year and the 1st of his career.
