= 1991 Mercedes Cup =

- Date: 15–21 July
- Edition: 14th
- Category: Championship Series
- Draw: 48S / 24D
- Prize money: $825,000
- Surface: Clay / outdoor
- Location: Stuttgart, Germany
- Venue: Tennis Club Weissenhof

Champions

Singles
- (Germany) Michael Stich

Doubles
- (Australia) Wally Masur / (Spain) Emilio Sánchez
- Stuttgart Open

The 1991 Mercedes Cup, was a men's tennis tournament played on outdoor clay courts and held at the Tennis Club Weissenhof in Stuttgart, Germany that was part of the Championship Series of the 1991 ATP Tour. It was the 14th edition of the tournament was held from 15 July until 21 July 1991. First-seeded Michael Stich won the singles title.

== Finals ==
=== Singles ===
(Germany) Michael Stich defeated (Argentina) Alberto Mancini, 1–6, 7–6^{(11–9)}, 6–4, 6–2

- It was Stich's 2nd singles title of the year and the 3rd of his career.

=== Doubles ===
(Australia) Wally Masur / (Spain) Emilio Sánchez defeated (Italy) Omar Camporese / (Socialist Federal Republic of Yugoslavia) Goran Ivanišević, 4–6, 6–3, 6–4
