= 1989 Mercedes Cup – Singles =

Singles
- 1989 Mercedes Cup

Final
- Champion: (Argentina) Martín Jaite
- Runner-up: (Socialist Federal Republic of Yugoslavia) Goran Prpić
- Score: 6–3, 6–2

Details
- Draw: 48 (4WC/6Q)
- Seeds: 16

Events
Singles	Doubles
- Stuttgart Open

Andre Agassi was the defending champion, but did not compete this year.

Martín Jaite, who was seeded 14th, won the title by defeating Goran Prpić 6–3, 6–2 in the final.

== Seeds ==
All seeds received a bye into the second round.

1. (Switzerland) Jakob Hlasek (second round)
2. (Argentina) Alberto Mancini (third round)
3. (United States) Aaron Krickstein (third round)
4. (United States) Kevin Curren (third round)
5. (Czechoslovakia) Miloslav Mečíř (second round)
6. (Sweden) Mikael Pernfors (third round)
7. (Argentina) Guillermo Pérez Roldán (quarterfinals)
8. (Spain) Sergi Bruguera (semifinals)
9. (Australia) John Fitzgerald (second round)
10. (Ecuador) Andrés Gómez (second round)
11. (Haiti) Ronald Agénor (third round)
12. (Spain) Jordi Arrese (quarterfinals)
13. (Australia) Darren Cahill (second round)
14. (Argentina) Martín Jaite (champion)
15. (Soviet Union) Alexander Volkov (second round)
16. (Sweden) Jan Gunnarsson (third round)

== Draw ==
Key

- Q = Qualifier
- WC = Wild card
- LL = Lucky loser
- Alt = Alternate
- ITF = ITF entry
- PR = Protected ranking
- SR = Special ranking
- SE = Special exempt
- JE = Junior exempt
- JR = Junior Accelerator Programme entrant
- CO = College Accelerator Programme entrant
- NG = Next Gen Accelerator Program entrant
- w/o = Walkover
- r = Retired
- d = Defaulted

=== Finals ===
Quarterfinals
WC	(Germany) Jens Wöhrmann	6	6
7	(Argentina) Guillermo Pérez Roldán	3	3
14	(Argentina) Martín Jaite	3	7	6
12	(Spain) Jordi Arrese	6	5	4
(Socialist Federal Republic of Yugoslavia) Goran Prpić	7	6	6
(Austria) Alex Antonitsch	6	7	3
8	(Spain) Sergi Bruguera	6	6
(Canada) Martin Wostenholme	1	4

Semifinals
WC	(Germany) Jens Wöhrmann	7	4	3
14	(Argentina) Martín Jaite	5	6	6
(Socialist Federal Republic of Yugoslavia) Goran Prpić	3	7	6
8	(Spain) Sergi Bruguera	6	5	1

Final
14	(Argentina) Martín Jaite	6	6
(Socialist Federal Republic of Yugoslavia) Goran Prpić	3	2

=== Top half ===
==== Section 1 ====
First round
WC	(West Germany) J Wöhrmann	6	4	7
(Socialist Federal Republic of Yugoslavia) B Orešar	2	6	6
Q	(Socialist Federal Republic of Yugoslavia) M Ostoja	4	3
(Italy) F Cancellotti	6	6
Q	(West Germany) M Zillner	6	3
Q	(France) F Santoro	7	6
(Italy) S Colombo	1	7	6
(France) O Delaître	6	6	1

Second round
1	(Switzerland) J Hlasek	4	6	3
WC	(West Germany) J Wöhrmann	6	4	6
(Italy) F Cancellotti	1	6	3
16	(Sweden) J Gunnarsson	6	3	6
10	(Ecuador) A Gómez	6	6	6
Q	(France) F Santoro	7	2	7
(Italy) S Colombo	1	6
7	(Argentina) G Pérez Roldán	6	7

Third round
WC	(West Germany) J Wöhrmann	6	6
16	(Sweden) J Gunnarsson	4	4
Q	(France) F Santoro	1	6	3
7	(Argentina) G Pérez Roldán	6	3	6

Quarterfinals
WC	(West Germany) J Wöhrmann	6	6
7	(Argentina) G Pérez Roldán	3	3

==== Section 2 ====
First round
Q	(Czechoslovakia) S Doseděl	0	7	2
Q	(West Germany) L Koslowski	6	5	6
(United States) L Duncan	0	6	3
Q	(Czechoslovakia) P Korda	6	0	6
(France) T Tulasne	7	7
WC	(Czechoslovakia) T Šmíd	6	6
(United States) M Davis	6	6	1
(Soviet Union) A Cherkasov	1	7	6

Second round
3	(United States) A Krickstein	6	6
Q	(West Germany) L Koslowski	2	3
Q	(Czechoslovakia) P Korda	3	1
14	(Argentina) M Jaite	6	6
12	(Spain) J Arrese	6	6
(France) T Tulasne	0	4
(Soviet Union) A Cherkasov	5	2
6	(Sweden) M Pernfors	7	6

Third round
3	(United States) A Krickstein	1	6	2
14	(Argentina) M Jaite	6	4	6
12	(Spain) J Arrese	6	6
6	(Sweden) M Pernfors	4	3

Quarterfinals
14	(Argentina) M Jaite	3	7	6
12	(Spain) J Arrese	6	5	4

=== Bottom half ===
==== Section 3 ====
First round
(Brazil) C Motta	3	2
(Socialist Federal Republic of Yugoslavia) G Prpić	6	6
(West Germany) M Stich	7	6
(Spain) F Luna	5	2
(Japan) S Matsuoka	6	6	1
(Austria) A Antonitsch	7	3	6
(Australia) B Drewett	3	2
(Argentina) H de la Peña	6	6

Second round
5	(Czechoslovakia) M Mečíř	0	3
(Socialist Federal Republic of Yugoslavia) G Prpić	6	6
(West Germany) M Stich	6	1	4
11	(Haiti) R Agénor	4	6	6
13	(Australia) D Cahill	4	1
(Austria) A Antonitsch	6	6
(Argentina) H de la Peña	3	4
4	(United States) K Curren	6	6

Third round
(Socialist Federal Republic of Yugoslavia) G Prpić	1	6	6
11	(Haiti) R Agénor	6	4	1
(Austria) A Antonitsch	5	6	6
4	(United States) K Curren	7	4	0

Quarterfinals
(Socialist Federal Republic of Yugoslavia) G Prpić	7	6	6
(Austria) A Antonitsch	6	7	3

==== Section 4 ====
First round
WC	(West Germany) M Sinner	6	7
(France) É Winogradsky	4	5
(Czechoslovakia) M Vajda	3	6	6
WC	(Sweden) M Tideman	6	1	2
(Canada) M Wostenholme	6	7
(Argentina) E Bengoechea	3	6
(Czechoslovakia) M Střelba	6	6
(Uruguay) M Filippini	7	7

Second round
8	(Spain) S Bruguera	6	6
WC	(West Germany) M Sinner	3	4
(Czechoslovakia) M Vajda	6	6
9	(Australia) J Fitzgerald	0	4
15	(Soviet Union) A Volkov	4	5
(Canada) M Wostenholme	6	7
(Uruguay) M Filippini	3	6
2	(Argentina) A Mancini	6	7

Third round
8	(Spain) S Bruguera	6	4	6
(Czechoslovakia) M Vajda	2	6	1
(Canada) M Wostenholme	6	6
2	(Argentina) A Mancini	2	2

Quarterfinals
8	(Spain) S Bruguera	6	6
(Canada) M Wostenholme	1	4
