= 1988 Mercedes Cup – Doubles =

Doubles
- 1988 Mercedes Cup

Final
- Champions: (Spain) Sergio Casal (Spain) Emilio Sánchez
- Runners-up: (Sweden) Anders Järryd (Denmark) Michael Mortensen
- Score: 4–6, 6–3, 6–4

Details
- Draw: 24
- Seeds: 8

Events
Singles	Doubles
- Stuttgart Open

Rick Leach and Tim Pawsat were the defending doubles champions, but none competed this year.

Sergio Casal and Emilio Sánchez won the title by defeating Anders Järryd and Michael Mortensen 4–6, 6–3, 6–4 in the final.

== Seeds ==
All seeds received a bye to the second round.

1. (Czechoslovakia) Miloslav Mečíř / (Czechoslovakia) Tomáš Šmíd (semifinals)
2. (Spain) Sergio Casal / (Spain) Emilio Sánchez (champions)
3. (France) Guy Forget / (France) Henri Leconte (semifinals)
4. (Sweden) Anders Järryd / (Denmark) Michael Mortensen (final)
5. (Switzerland) Jakob Hlasek / (Switzerland) Claudio Mezzadri (quarterfinals)
6. (United States) Brad Gilbert / (Ecuador) Andrés Gómez (quarterfinals)
7. (Czechoslovakia) Stanislav Birner / (Australia) Carl Limberger (second round)
8. (West Germany) Tore Meinecke / (West Germany) Ricki Osterthun (quarterfinals)

== Draw ==
Key

- Q = Qualifier
- WC = Wild card
- LL = Lucky loser
- Alt = Alternate
- ITF = ITF entry
- PR = Protected ranking
- SR = Special ranking
- SE = Special exempt
- JE = Junior exempt
- JR = Junior Accelerator Programme entrant
- CO = College Accelerator Programme entrant
- NG = Next Gen Accelerator Program entrant
- w/o = Walkover
- r = Retired
- d = Defaulted

=== Finals ===
Semifinals
1	(Czechoslovakia) Miloslav Mečíř (Czechoslovakia) Tomáš Šmíd	4	2
4	(Sweden) Anders Järryd (Denmark) Michael Mortensen	6	6
3	(France) Guy Forget (France) Henri Leconte	5	3
2	(Spain) Sergio Casal (Spain) Emilio Sánchez	7	6

Final
4	(Sweden) Anders Järryd (Denmark) Michael Mortensen	6	3	4
2	(Spain) Sergio Casal (Spain) Emilio Sánchez	4	6	6

=== Top half ===
First round
(Austria) T Muster (Czechoslovakia) M Vajda	7	6
(Australia) A Emerson (United States) D Tarr	6	3
(West Germany) A Mronz (West Germany) M Westphal	7	2	2
WC	(Argentina) M Jaite (Argentina) G Pérez Roldán	6	6	6
(Haiti) R Agénor (West Germany) P Vojtischek	6	3
(Australia) R Barlow (Australia) G Pfitzner	7	6
(Argentina) E Bengoechea (Argentina) A Mancini	0	4
(West Germany) D Keretić (France) É Winogradsky	6	6

Second round
1	(Czechoslovakia) M Mečíř (Czechoslovakia) T Šmíd	6	6	6
(Austria) T Muster (Czechoslovakia) M Vajda	1	7	4
WC	(Argentina) M Jaite (Argentina) G Pérez Roldán	2	5
8	(West Germany) T Meinecke (West Germany) R Osterthun	6	7
4	(Sweden) A Järryd (Denmark) M Mortensen	4	6	6
(Australia) R Barlow (Australia) G Pfitzner	6	3	4
(West Germany) D Keretić (France) É Winogradsky	4	4
5	(Switzerland) J Hlasek (Switzerland) C Mezzadri	6	6

Quarterfinals
1	(Czechoslovakia) M Mečíř (Czechoslovakia) T Šmíd	6	6
8	(West Germany) T Meinecke (West Germany) R Osterthun	3	2
4	(Sweden) A Järryd (Denmark) M Mortensen	6	3	6
5	(Switzerland) J Hlasek (Switzerland) C Mezzadri	3	6	2

Semifinals
1	(Czechoslovakia) M Mečíř (Czechoslovakia) T Šmíd	4	2
4	(Sweden) A Järryd (Denmark) M Mortensen	6	6

=== Bottom half ===
First round
(West Germany) U Fischer (West Germany) H Rittersbacher	3	4
(Iran) M Bahrami (France) J Potier	6	6
(South Africa) D Maasdorp (West Germany) T Theine	7	3	3
(Chile) Cristián Araya (Mexico) Miguel Rodríguez	6	6	6
(Japan) S Matsuoka (Chile) P Rebolledo	6	6
(Spain) J Arrese (Argentina) F Davín	1	2
WC	(Sweden) M Tideman (France) T Tulasne	6	6
(Chile) S Cortés (Brazil) C Fernandes	2	1

Second round
6	(United States) B Gilbert (Ecuador) A Gómez	6	6
(Iran) M Bahrami (France) J Potier	4	2
(Chile) C Araya (Mexico) Miguel Rodríguez	1	1
3	(France) G Forget (France) H Leconte	6	6
7	(Czechoslovakia) S Birner (Australia) C Limberger	0	6	4
(Japan) S Matsuoka (Chile) P Rebolledo	6	4	6
WC	(Sweden) M Tideman (France) T Tulasne	3	2
2	(Spain) S Casal (Spain) E Sánchez	6	6

Quarterfinals
6	(United States) B Gilbert (Ecuador) A Gómez	6	0
3	(France) G Forget (France) H Leconte	7	6
(Japan) S Matsuoka (Chile) P Rebolledo	7	2	6
2	(Spain) S Casal (Spain) E Sánchez	6	6	7

Semifinals
3	(France) G Forget (France) H Leconte	5	3
2	(Spain) S Casal (Spain) E Sánchez	7	6
