= 1988 Mercedes Cup =

- Date: 11–17 July
- Edition: 11th
- Category: Grand Prix
- Draw: 48S / 24D
- Prize money: $275,000
- Surface: Clay / outdoor
- Location: Stuttgart, West Germany
- Venue: Tennis Club Weissenhof

Champions

Singles
- (United States) Andre Agassi

Doubles
- (Spain) Sergio Casal / (Spain) Emilio Sánchez
- Stuttgart Open

The 1988 Mercedes Cup, was a men's tennis tournament played on outdoor clay courts and held at the Tennis Club Weissenhof in Stuttgart, West Germany that was part of the 1988 Grand Prix circuit. It was the 11th edition of the tournament and was held from 11 July until 17 July 1988. Second-seeded Andre Agassi won the singles title.

== Finals ==
=== Singles ===
(United States) Andre Agassi defeated (Ecuador) Andrés Gómez, 6–4, 6–2

- It was Agassi's 4th singles title of the year and the 5th of his career.

=== Doubles ===
(Spain) Sergio Casal / (Spain) Emilio Sánchez defeated (Sweden) Anders Järryd / (Denmark) Michael Mortensen, 4–6, 6–3, 6–4
