= 1986 Tel Aviv Open =

Tennis tournament

- Date: October 6–13
- Edition: 7th
- Category: Grand Prix
- Draw: 32S / 16D
- Prize money: $85,000
- Surface: Hard / outdoor
- Location: Ramat HaSharon, Tel Aviv District, Israel
- Venue: Israel Tennis Centers

Champions

Singles
- (United States) Brad Gilbert

Doubles
- (United States) John Letts / (Sweden) Peter Lundgren
← 1985 ·	Tel Aviv Open	· 1987 →

The 1986 Tel Aviv Open was a men's tennis tournament played on hard courts that was part of the 1986 Nabisco Grand Prix. It was played at the Israel Tennis Centers in the Tel Aviv District city of Ramat HaSharon, Israel from October 6 through October 13, 1986. Brad Gilbert won the singles title.

== Finals ==
=== Singles ===
(United States) Brad Gilbert defeated (United States) Aaron Krickstein 7–5, 6–2

- It was Gilbert's 3rd singles title of the year and the 9th of his career.

=== Doubles ===
(United States) John Letts / (Sweden) Peter Lundgren defeated (South Africa) Christo Steyn / (South Africa) Danie Visser 6–3, 3–6, 6–3

- It was Letts' only title of the year and the 1st of his career. It was Lundgren's only title of the year and the 2nd of his career.
