= 1985 Tel Aviv Open =

- Date: October 14–21
- Edition: 6th
- Category: Grand Prix
- Draw: 32S / 16D
- Prize money: $80,000
- Surface: Hard / outdoor
- Location: Ramat HaSharon, Tel Aviv District, Israel
- Venue: Israel Tennis Centers

Champions

Singles
- (United States) Brad Gilbert

Doubles
- (United States) Brad Gilbert / (Romania) Ilie Năstase
← 1984 ·	Tel Aviv Open	· 1986 →

The 1985 Tel Aviv Open was a men's tennis tournament played on outdoor hard courts that was part of the 1985 Nabisco Grand Prix. It was the sixth edition of the tournament and was played at the Israel Tennis Centers in the Tel Aviv District city of Ramat HaSharon, Israel from October 14 through October 21, 1985. First-seeded Brad Gilbert won the singles title.

== Finals ==
=== Singles ===
(United States) Brad Gilbert defeated (Israel) Amos Mansdorf 6–3, 6–2

- It was Gilbert's 3rd title of the year and the 6th of his career.

=== Doubles ===
(United States) Brad Gilbert / (Romania) Ilie Năstase defeated (South Africa) Michael Robertson / (Romania) Florin Segărceanu 6–3, 6–2

- It was Gilbert's 3rd title of the year and the 6th of his career. It was Nastase's only title of the year and the 102nd of his career.
