= Peter Carlsson =

Swedish tennis player

- Country (sports): Sweden
- Residence: Tyresö
- Born: 13 April 1963 (age 61); Stockholm, Sweden
- Height: 1.83 m (6 ft 0 in)
- Plays: Left-handed
- Prize money: $70,262

Singles
- Career record: 10–22
- Career titles: 0
- Highest ranking: No. 119 (13 April 1987)

Grand Slam singles results
- Australian Open: 2R (1987)
- French Open: 1R (1987)

Doubles
- Career record: 3–22
- Career titles: 0
- Highest ranking: No. 101 (18 November 1985)

Grand Slam doubles results
- Australian Open: 1R (1985, 1987)
- French Open: 1R (1986)
- Wimbledon: 1R (1986)

Peter Carlsson (born 13 April 1963) is a former professional tennis player from Sweden.

== Career ==
Carlsson was a quarter-finalist at the Tel Aviv Open in both 1985 and 1986.

The Swede defeated Jason Stoltenberg in the opening round of the 1987 Australian Open. He lost the first two sets to John Frawley in his next match and then retired from the tournament with a shoulder injury. In the 1987 French Open he was beaten in the first round by countryman Jan Gunnarsson.

He has coached many top Swedish tennis players since retiring, including Jonas Björkman, Thomas Enqvist and Robin Söderling.

== Challenger titles ==
=== Doubles: (2) ===
No.	Date	Tournament	Surface	Partner	Opponents	Score
1.	1985	Vienna, Austria	Carpet	(Sweden) Jonas Svensson	(Czechoslovakia) Josef Čihák (Italy) Alessandro de Minicis	6–3, 6–2
2.	1986	Helsinki, Finland	Carpet	(Sweden) Jörgen Windahl	(United States) Kelly Jones (United States) David Livingston	6–2, 4–6, 7–6
