= Amit Naor =

Israeli tennis player

- Full name: Amit Naor
- Native name: עמית נאור
- Country (sports): Israel
- Born: 25 July 1967 (age 58) Rehovot, Israel
- Height: 5 ft 10 in (178 cm)
- Plays: Right-handed
- Prize money: $27,628

Singles
- Career record: 3–7
- Highest ranking: No. 245 (5 October 1987)

Doubles
- Career record: 0–5
- Highest ranking: No. 397 (11 May 1987)

Amit Naor (Hebrew: עמית נאור; born 25 July 1967) is an Israeli former professional tennis player.

== Biography ==
Naor was born in Rehovot, a city in the Central District of Israel.

=== Tennis career ===
A right-handed player, Naor reached a best singles ranking on tour of 245 in the world.

Most of his Grand Prix/ATP Tour main draw appearances came at the Tel Aviv Open, where he made the round of 16 on three occasions, most notably beating third-seeded Vijay Amritraj in the 1985 edition. From 1986 he competed as a professional and he finished up on tour in 1991.

=== Sports agent ===
Naor now works as a sports agent, until 2017 for Creative Artists Agency (CAA). While an independent agent in 2003, he signed a deal with sixteen-year-old Novak Djokovic and in 2008 joined CAA. Djokovic left for IMG in 2012, but Naor has gone on to represent other top players, including Tomas Berdych, Milos Raonic and Dominic Thiem.

In 2017, Naor was fired by CAA over harassment claims made by a female agent working for the company.
