= Andreas Maurer (tennis) =

German tennis player

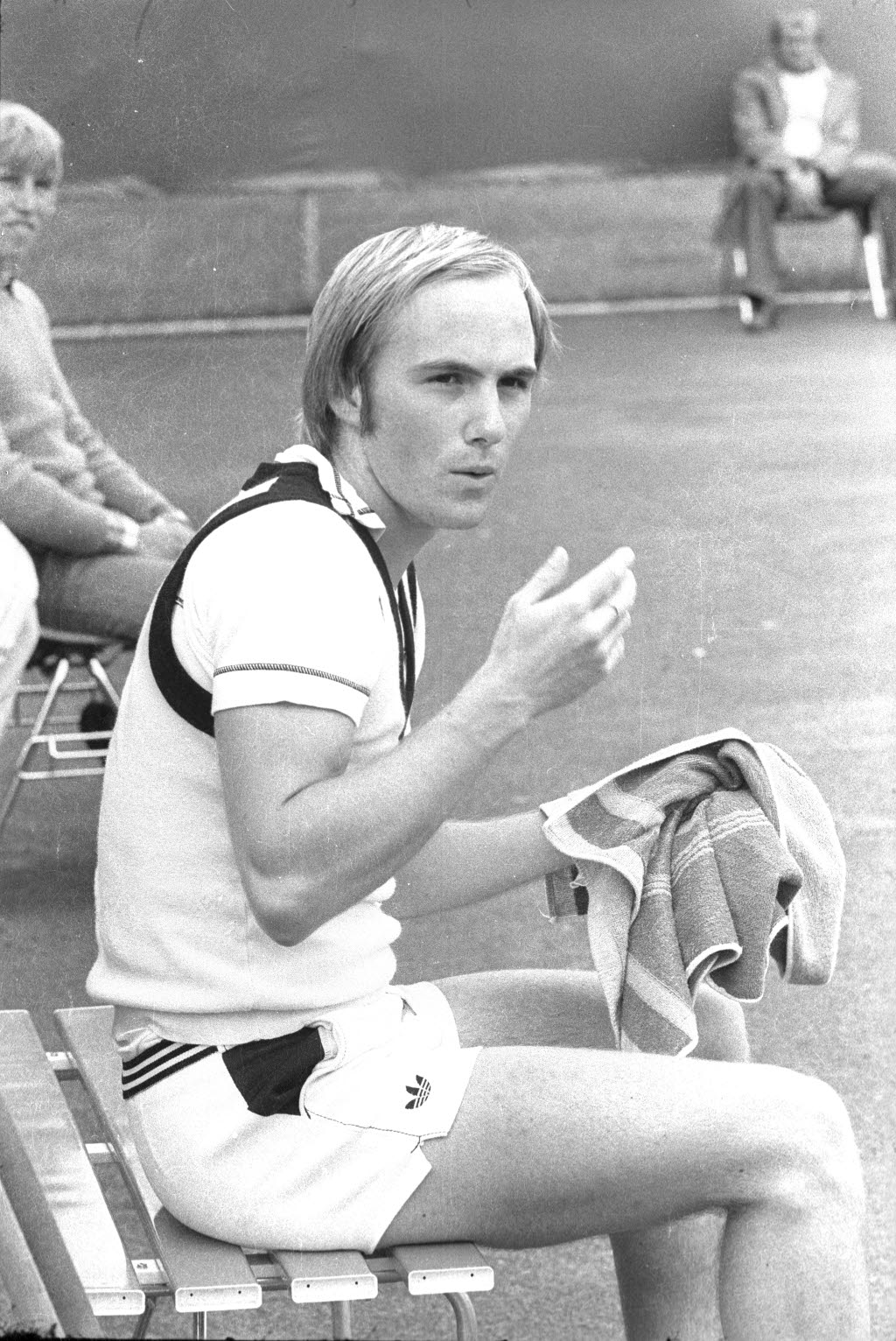
- Andreas Maurer (1977)
- Country (sports): Germany
- Born: 8 March 1958 (age 68) Gelsenk-Buer, Germany
- Height: 1.75 m (5 ft 9 in)
- Turned pro: 1978
- Retired: 1990
- Plays: Right-handed (one-handed backhand)
- Prize money: $391,562

Singles
- Career record: 114–141
- Career titles: 1
- Highest ranking: No. 24 (5 May 1986)

Grand Slam singles results
- Australian Open: 3R (1984)
- French Open: 4R (1982)
- Wimbledon: 4R (1985)

Doubles
- Career record: 78–93
- Career titles: 2
- Highest ranking: No. 53 (18 March 1983)

Andreas Maurer (born 8 March 1958) is a former tennis player from West Germany.

Maurer won one singles title (1985, Madrid) and two doubles titles (1984, Stuttgart outdoor and 1986, Geneva) during his professional career. The right-hander reached his career-high singles ATP-ranking in May 1986, when he became the world No. 24. His best doubles ranking of world No. 53 was achieved in March 1983

== Grand Prix career finals ==
=== Singles: 3 (1–2) ===
Result	W-L	Date	Tournament	Surface	Opponent	Score
Win	1–0	May 1985	Madrid, Spain	Clay	(United States) Lawson Duncan	7–5, 6–2
Loss	1–1	Jul 1985	Gstaad, Switzerland	Clay	(Sweden) Joakim Nyström	4–6, 6–1, 5–7, 3–6
Loss	1–2	Sep 1986	Barcelona, Spain	Clay	(Sweden) Kent Carlsson	2–6, 2–6, 0–6

=== Doubles: 3 (2–1) ===
Result	W-L	Date	Tournament	Surface	Partner	Opponents	Score
Loss	0–1	Jul 1982	Stuttgart, West Germany	Clay	(West Germany) Wolfgang Popp	(Australia) Mark Edmondson (United States) Brian Teacher	3–6, 1–6
Win	1–1	Jul 1984	Stuttgart, West Germany	Clay	(United States) Sandy Mayer	(United States) Fritz Buehning (United States) Ferdi Taygan	7–6, 6–4
Win	2–1	Sep 1986	Geneva, Switzerland	Clay	(West Germany) Jörgen Windahl	(Argentina) Gustavo Luza (Argentina) Gustavo Tiberti	6–4, 3–6, 6–4
