= Francisco Maciel (tennis) =

Mexican tennis player

- Country (sports): Mexico
- Residence: Queretaro, Mexico
- Born: 7 January 1964 (age 62) Queretaro, Mexico
- Height: 1.85 m (6 ft 1 in)
- Turned pro: 1982
- Retired: 1992
- Plays: Right-handed (one-handed backhand)
- Prize money: $213,185

Singles
- Career record: 43–53
- Career titles: 0
- Highest ranking: No. 35 (23 June 1986)

Grand Slam singles results
- French Open: 4R (1986)
- Wimbledon: 1R (1986)
- US Open: 2R (1986)

Other tournaments
- Olympic Games: F (1984, demonstration)

Doubles
- Career record: 8–17
- Career titles: 0
- Highest ranking: No. 157 (16 September 1985)

Francisco Maciel García (born 7 January 1964) is a former tennis player from Mexico. He reached his highest singles ATP-ranking in June 1986 of world No. 35. Maciel represented his native country as a qualifier at the 1992 Summer Olympics in Barcelona, where he was defeated in the first round by Switzerland's Jakob Hlasek. He won the silver medal at the 1984 Summer Olympics, when tennis was a demonstration sport.

== Career finals ==
=== Singles (1 loss) ===
Legend
Grand Slam (0)
Tennis Masters Cup (0)
ATP Tour (5)

Result	W/L	Date	Tournament	Surface	Opponent	Score
Loss	0–1	Jun 1986	Athens, Greece	Clay	(Sweden) Henrik Sundström	0–6, 5–7
