= Jörgen Windahl =

Swedish tennis player (born 1963)

- Country (sports): Sweden
- Residence: Helsingborg
- Born: 12 March 1963 (age 63) Danderyd, Sweden
- Height: 1.83 m (6 ft 0 in)
- Plays: Right-handed
- Prize money: $152,785

Singles
- Career record: 13–29
- Career titles: 0
- Highest ranking: No. 108 (10 August 1987)

Grand Slam singles results
- Wimbledon: 1R (1981, 1986)

Doubles
- Career record: 26–38
- Career titles: 1
- Highest ranking: No. 69 (26 June 1989)

Grand Slam doubles results
- Wimbledon: 1R (1981)

Jörgen Windahl (born 12 March 1963) is a former professional tennis player from Sweden. (Note: Attributed to multiple references:)

== Career ==
Windahl was the Boys' Singles Champion at the 1981 Australian Open, the first Swede to win the junior title. He defeated Pat Cash in the final. In Wimbledon later that year, he played in both the men's doubles and singles, but wasn't able to make it past the first round in either. He lost to Ángel Giménez in the singles and with his partner Robert Booth was defeated in five set by Scott McCain and Steve Meister in the doubles.

As a singles player he reached the quarter-finals at Metz in 1986 and was a semi-finalist in Madrid the following year. He again competed at Wimbledon in 1987 but lost in the opening round to American qualifier Ken Flach.

He was more successful on the doubles circuit, winning his first career title in the 1986 Geneva Open. The Swede was also a doubles finalist at Bologna in 1989 and doubles semi-finals at both Boston and Tel Aviv in 1986 and again in the 1989 Madrid Tennis Grand Prix.

== Grand Prix career finals ==
=== Doubles: 2 (1–1) ===
Result	W-L	Date	Tournament	Surface	Partner	Opponents	Score
Win	1–0	Sep 1986	Geneva, Switzerland	Clay	(West Germany) Andreas Maurer	(Argentina) Gustavo Luza (Argentina) Gustavo Tiberti	6–4, 3–6, 6–4
Loss	1–1	Jun 1989	Bologna, Italy	Clay	(Sweden) Tomas Nydahl	(Spain) Sergio Casal (Spain) Javier Sánchez	2–6, 3–6

== Challenger titles ==
=== Singles: (2) ===
No.	Year	Tournament	Surface	Opponent in the final	Score
1.	1986	Budapest, Hungary	Clay	(Czechoslovakia) Jaroslav Navrátil	6–1, 7–5
2.	1988	Nyon, Switzerland	Clay	(Spain) Francisco Clavet	2–6, 6–2, 6–1

=== Doubles: (5) ===
No.	Year	Tournament	Surface	Partner	Opponents in the final	Score
1.	1982	Tampere, Finland	Clay	(Sweden) Magnus Tideman	(Czechoslovakia) Stanislav Birner (Paraguay) Francisco González	6–4, 7–6
2.	1986	Helsinki, Finland	Carpet	(Sweden) Peter Carlsson	(United States) Kelly Jones (United States) David Livingston	6–2, 4–6, 7–6
3.	1988	Clermont-Ferrand, France	Clay	(United States) Rill Baxter	(France) Jean-Philippe Fleurian (West Germany) Andreas Maurer	7–6, 6–4
4.	1988	Tarbes, France	Clay	(Portugal) João Cunha-Silva	(Brazil) Eduardo Furusho (Brazil) César Kist	6–2, 6–1
5.	1989	Hossegor, France	Clay	(Sweden) Peter Svensson	(Sweden) David Engel (South Africa) Barry Moir	6–4, 7–5
