= Gustavo Tiberti =

Argentine tennis player

- Country (sports): Argentina
- Residence: Buenos Aires
- Born: 11 December 1959 (age 65); Rosario, Argentina
- Height: 1.75 m (5 ft 9 in)
- Plays: Right-handed

Singles
- Career record: 14–29
- Career titles: 0
- Highest ranking: No. 130 (22 December 1980)

Grand Slam singles results
- French Open: 2R (1982)

Doubles
- Career record: 32–44
- Career titles: 0
- Highest ranking: No. 67 (8 December 1986)

Grand Slam doubles results
- French Open: 3R (1986)
- Wimbledon: 1R (1986)

Gustavo Tiberti (born 11 December 1959) is a former professional tennis player from Argentina.

== Career ==
Tiberti defeated American qualifier Charles Strode in the opening round of the 1982 French Open. In the second round he met Damir Keretić, who he had beaten two weeks earlier in Florence, but on this occasion proved too strong for Tiberti in a five setter. At the 1983 French Open he again faced Keretic, this time in a first round match, which he lost in four sets.

On tour he had his best ever showing in 1982, at the Swedish Open, where he reached the semi-finals with wins over Thierry Tulasne, Jonathan Smith and Carl-Axel Hageskog. He was defeated by a young Mats Wilander in his semi-final.

He had a good year playing doubles in 1986, finishing runner-up at two Grand Prix events, the Copa Banco Galacia (Buenos Aires) and Geneva Open. With his partner from those finals, Gustavo Luza, Tiberti also made the round of 16 at that year's French Open doubles.

== Grand Prix career finals ==
=== Doubles: 2 (0–2) ===
Result	W-L	Date	Tournament	Surface	Partner	Opponents	Score
Loss	0–1	Sep 1986	Geneva, Switzerland	Clay	(Argentina) Gustavo Luza	(West Germany) Andreas Maurer (Sweden) Jörgen Windahl	4–6, 6–3, 4–6
Loss	0–2	Nov 1986	Buenos Aires, Argentina	Clay	(Argentina) Gustavo Luza	(France) Loïc Courteau (Austria) Horst Skoff	6–3, 4–6, 3–6

== Challenger titles ==
=== Doubles: (3) ===
No.	Year	Tournament	Surface	Partner	Opponents	Score
1.	1984	Viña del Mar, Chile	Clay	(Argentina) Carlos Gattiker	(Chile) Hans Gildemeister (Chile) Belus Prajoux	6–4, 5–7, 6–3
2.	1986	Viña del Mar, Chile	Clay	(Argentina) Gustavo Luza	(South Africa) Craig Campbell (Peru) Carlos di Laura	6–1, 6–2
3.	1986	Porto Alegre, Brazil	Clay	(Argentina) Gustavo Luza	(Brazil) Júlio Góes (Brazil) Ney Keller	6–3, 6–3
