= Juan Antonio Rodríguez (tennis) =

Spanish tennis player (born 1962)

- Country (sports): Spain
- Born: 5 May 1962 (age 63); Madrid, Spain
- Prize money: $46,337

Singles
- Career record: 2–10
- Career titles: 0
- Highest ranking: No. 140 (4 August 1986)

Doubles
- Career record: 4–12
- Career titles: 0
- Highest ranking: No. 150 (29 July 1985)

Juan Antonio Rodríguez-Aransay (born 5 May 1962) is a former professional tennis player from Spain.

== Biography ==
Born in Madrid, Rodríguez began on the professional tour in 1982.

He twice made the second round of Grand Prix tournaments and on both occasions was beaten by the number one seed. At the 1985 Stockholm Open he progressed when France's Henri Leconte retired hurt with the Spaniard two games from victory, then was beaten in the second round by John McEnroe. He lost to Stefan Edberg in the second round of the 1986 Swedish Open, having earlier defeated Craig Campbell.

His best performance on the Grand Prix circuit in doubles came at the 1986 Athens Open, where he and José Clavet reached the semi-finals.

At Challenger level he won one title, at Hanko, Finland in 1986, which he secured with a win over world number 55 Jan Gunnarsson in the final.

Nowadays he is a tennis teacher in the Real Grupo de Cultura Covadonga's club in Gijón, Asturias.

== Challenger titles ==
=== Singles: (1) ===
No.	Year	Tournament	Surface	Opponent	Score
1.	1986	Hanko, Finland	Clay	(Sweden) Jan Gunnarsson	2–6, 6–1, 6–2
