= Gustavo Luza =

Argentine tennis player

- Country (sports): Argentina
- Born: 11 October 1962 (age 63) Buenos Aires, Argentina
- Height: 1.85 m (6 ft 1 in)
- Plays: Right-handed
- Prize money: $208,619

Singles
- Career record: 1–4
- Career titles: 0
- Highest ranking: No. 319 (1 August 1988)

Grand Slam singles results
- Australian Open: 2R (1991)
- French Open: 3R (1986, 1990)
- Wimbledon: 2R (1990, 1991)

Doubles
- Career record: 92–93
- Career titles: 5
- Highest ranking: No. 37 (9 July 1990)

Grand Slam doubles results
- French Open: SF (1991)
- Wimbledon: 1R (1986)

Gustavo Luza (born 11 October 1962) is a former tennis player from Argentina.

Luza turned professional in 1985. He was most known for playing doubles, and during his career he won 5 doubles titles, including the Barcelona Open with Christian Miniussi. He reached his highest doubles ATP-ranking on July 9, 1990, when he became the number 37 of the world.

In 2002, after retiring from professional tennis, Luza became the captain of the Argentina Davis Cup team from 2002 to 2004.

== Career finals ==
=== Doubles: 9 (5 titles / 4 runner-ups) ===
| Result | W/L | Date | Tournament | Surface | Partner | Opponents | Score |
|---|---|---|---|---|---|---|---|
| Loss | 0–1 | Sep 1986 | Geneva, Switzerland | Clay | (Argentina) Gustavo Tiberti | (West Germany) Andreas Maurer (Sweden) Jörgen Windahl | 4–6, 6–3, 4–6 |
| Loss | 0–2 | Nov 1986 | Buenos Aires, Argentina | Clay | (Argentina) Gustavo Tiberti | (France) Loïc Courteau (Austria) Horst Skoff | 6–3, 4–6, 3–6 |
| Loss | 0–3 | Sep 1988 | Geneva, Switzerland | Clay | (Argentina) Guillermo Pérez Roldán | (Iran) Mansour Bahrami (Czechoslovakia) Tomáš Šmíd | 4–6, 3–6 |
| Loss | 0–4 | Aug 1989 | San Marino | Clay | (Argentina) Pablo Albano | (Italy) Simone Colombo (Switzerland) Claudio Mezzadri | 4–6, 1–6 |
| Win | 1–4 | Sep 1989 | Guarujá, Spain | Clay | (Argentina) Christian Miniussi | (Spain) Sergio Casal (Czechoslovakia) Tomáš Šmíd | 7–5, 5–7, 6–3 |
| Win | 2–4 | Feb 1990 | Guarujá, Brazil | Clay | (Argentina) Javier Frana | (Brazil) Luiz Mattar (Brazil) Cássio Motta | 7–6, 7–6 |
| Win | 3–4 | May 1990 | Bologna, Italy | Clay | (Germany) Udo Riglewski | (France) Jérôme Potier (United States) Jim Pugh | 7–6, 4–6, 6–1 |
| Win | 4–4 | Apr 1991 | Madrid, Spain | Clay | (Brazil) Cássio Motta | (Brazil) Luiz Mattar (Brazil) Jaime Oncins | 6–0, 7–5 |
| Win | 5–4 | Sep 1992 | Cologne, Germany | Clay | (Argentina) Horacio de la Peña | (Sweden) Ronnie Båthman (Belgium) Libor Pimek | 6–7, 6–0, 6–2 |

| Preceded by (Argentina) Alejandro Gattiker | Davis Cup Argentina captain 2003-2004 | Succeeded by (Argentina) Alberto Mancini |
