= Martín Jaite =

Argentine tennis player

- Country (sports): Argentina
- Residence: Buenos Aires, Argentina
- Born: 9 October 1964 (age 61) Buenos Aires, Argentina
- Height: 1.77 m (5 ft 10 in)
- Turned pro: 1983
- Retired: 1993
- Plays: Right-handed (one-handed backhand)
- Prize money: $1,873,881

Singles
- Career record: 301–179
- Career titles: 12
- Highest ranking: No. 10 (9 July 1990)

Grand Slam singles results
- Australian Open: 3R (1992)
- French Open: QF (1985)
- Wimbledon: 2R (1986)
- US Open: 3R (1985, 1989)

Other tournaments
- WCT Finals: QF (1988)
- Olympic Games: QF (1988)

Doubles
- Career record: 60–82
- Career titles: 1
- Highest ranking: No. 59 (13 May 1985)

Grand Slam doubles results
- Australian Open: 1R (1991)
- French Open: 1R (1985)
- US Open: 1R (1989, 1990)

Other doubles tournaments
- Olympic Games: 1R (1988)

Martín Jaite (born 9 October 1964) is a former top-10 professional tennis player from Argentina.

Jaite's career-high Association of Tennis Professionals singles ranking was world no. 10, which he achieved in the summer of 1990, and he won a total of 12 titles and $1,873,881 in tour prize money during his career.

Jaite's playing style leveraged his consistency, speed, thoughtful use of tactics, and fitness to compensate for his lack of power.

== Early life ==
Jaite was born in Buenos Aires, Argentina, and is Jewish.

== Tennis career ==
Jaite was a top junior in both Spain and Argentina. He joined Argentina's Davis Cup team. He began playing on the ATP tour in 1983, and soon was ranked among the top 20 players in the world. He reached the quarterfinals in competition at the French Open in 1985, defeating Paolo Canè, Trevor Allan, Miloslav Mečíř and Heinz Günthardt before losing to Ivan Lendl. In May 1986 at Forest Hills Jaite defeated world No. 4 Boris Becker in straight sets.

In May 1987, Jaite beat world no. 9 Henri Leconte in Germany in two tiebreaks. In September 1987, Jaite upset world no. 3 Mats Wilander in five sets to win a competition in Barcelona, Spain. In April 1989, he upset world no. 8 Jakob Hlasek in two sets in Monte Carlo.

Jaite became only the sixth South American to be ranked in the top 10 in the ATP computer rankings, reaching no. 10 in 1990. In May 1990, he defeated world No. 2 Stefan Edberg in three sets in Germany. Jaite defeated world No. 4 Guy Forget in April 1991 in France, and then again in July, in Gstaad, Switzerland.

=== Olympics ===
He participated for his native country at the 1988 Summer Olympics in Seoul, but lost to Brad Gilbert, the eventual winner of the bronze medal.

=== Davis Cup ===
Jaite was 14–20 in Davis Cup play, 11–7 in singles on clay, from 1984 to 1999.

Jaite was involved in a Davis Cup tie against the US in Buenos Aires when Andre Agassi was leading 6–2, 6–2, 5–0. Jaite was leading 40–0 in the sixth game of the third set, and missed his first serve. Agassi then called out to his then-coach Nick Bollettieri, "Hey watch this!", and then followed by catching the second serve in his left hand to give Jaite the game. Viewed as an act of disrespect, Agassi was booed by the crowd for five minutes.

=== After tennis ===
Jaite has had an important role in Argentine tennis since his retirement. He is the tournament director for ATP Buenos Aires, the Buenos Aires Challenger, and director of Futures events in Argentina. From July 2007 till December 2008, Jaite was coaching David Nalbandian, and helped lead him to titles in Madrid and Bercy, where he became the first man to defeat the top two players in the world, Roger Federer and Rafael Nadal, in consecutive tournaments. In 2011, Jaite was named captain of the Argentina Davis Cup team.

== Career finals ==
=== Singles: 19 (12 wins – 7 losses) ===
Legend (singles)
Grand Slam (0)
Tennis Masters Cup (0)
ATP Masters Series (0)
Grand Prix / ATP Tour (12)

Result	W/L	Date	Tournament	Surface	Opponent	Score
Win	1–0	Feb 1985	Buenos Aires, Argentina	Clay	(Uruguay) Diego Pérez	6–4, 6–2
Loss	1–1	Jul 1985	Boston, U.S.	Clay	(Sweden) Mats Wilander	2–6, 4–6
Loss	1–2	Jul 1985	Washington DC, U.S.	Clay	(France) Yannick Noah	4–6, 3–6
Win	2–2	Jun 1986	Bologna, Italy	Clay	(Italy) Paolo Canè	6–2, 4–6, 6–4
Loss	2–3	Jul 1986	Boston, U.S.	Clay	(Ecuador) Andrés Gómez	5–7, 4–6
Win	3–3	Sep 1986	Stuttgart, West Germany	Clay	(Sweden) Jonas Svensson	7–5, 6–2
Loss	3–4	May 1987	Rome, Italy	Clay	(Sweden) Mats Wilander	3–6, 4–6, 4–6
Win	4–4	Sep 1987	Barcelona, Spain	Clay	(Sweden) Mats Wilander	7–6^{(7–5)}, 6–4, 4–6, 0–6, 6–4
Win	5–4	Sep 1987	Palermo, Italy	Clay	(Czechoslovakia) Karel Nováček	7–6^{(7–5)}, 6–7^{(7–9)}, 6–4
Loss	5–5	Apr 1988	Monte Carlo, Monaco	Clay	(United States) Ivan Lendl	7–5, 4–6, 5–7, 3–6
Loss	5–6	Apr 1989	Rio de Janeiro, Brazil	Carpet	(Brazil) Luiz Mattar	4–6, 7–5, 4–6
Win	6–6	Jul 1989	Stuttgart, West Germany	Clay	(Croatia) Goran Prpić	6–3, 6–2
Loss	6–7	Jul 1989	Kitzbühel, Austria	Clay	(Spain) Emilio Sánchez	6–7^{(1–7)}, 1–6, 6–2, 2–6
Win	7–7	Sep 1989	Madrid, Spain	Clay	(Spain) Jordi Arrese	6–3, 6–2
Win	8–7	Nov 1989	São Paulo, Brazil	Clay	(Spain) Javier Sánchez	7–6^{(7–5)}, 6–3
Win	9–7	Nov 1989	Itaparica, Brazil	Hard	(United States) Jay Berger	6–4, 6–4
Win	10–7	Feb 1990	Guarujá, Brazil	Hard	(Brazil) Luiz Mattar	3–6, 6–4, 6–3
Win	11–7	Jul 1990	Gstaad, Switzerland	Clay	(Spain) Sergi Bruguera	6–3, 6–7^{(5–7)}, 6–2, 6–2
Win	12–7	Apr 1991	Nice, France	Clay	(Croatia) Goran Prpić	3–6, 7–6^{(7–1)}, 6–3

=== Doubles: 2 (1 win – 1 loss) ===
Result	W/L	Date	Tournament	Surface	Partner	Opponents	Score
Loss	0–1	Oct 1984	Barcelona, Spain	Clay	(Paraguay) Víctor Pecci	(Czech Republic) Pavel Složil (Czech Republic) Tomáš Šmíd	2–6, 0–6
Win	1–1	Feb 1985	Buenos Aires, Argentina	Clay	(Argentina) Christian Miniussi	(Argentina) Eduardo Bengoechea (Uruguay) Diego Pérez	6–4, 6–3

== See also ==
- List of Jewish tennis players

Preceded by (Argentina) Tito Vázquez	Davis Cup Argentina captain 2012–2014	Succeeded by (Argentina) Daniel Orsanic
