= 1989 Grand Prix de Tennis de Toulouse =

- Date: 9–15 October
- Edition: 8th
- Category: Regular Series
- Draw: 32S / 16D
- Prize money: $225,000
- Surface: Carpet / indoor
- Location: Toulouse, France

Champions

Singles
- (United States) Jimmy Connors

Doubles
- (Iran) Mansour Bahrami / (France) Éric Winogradsky
| ← 1988 · | Grand Prix de Tennis de Toulouse | · 1990 → |

The 1989 Grand Prix de Tennis de Toulouse was a men's tennis tournament played on indoor carpet courts in Toulouse, France that was part of the Regular Series of the 1989 Grand Prix tennis circuit. It was the eighth edition of the tournament and was held from 9 October until 15 October 1989. Second-seeded Jimmy Connors won the singles title.

== Finals ==
=== Singles ===
(United States) Jimmy Connors defeated (United States) John McEnroe, 6–3, 6–3

- It was Connors' 1st singles title of the year and the 108th of his career.

=== Doubles ===
(Iran) Mansour Bahrami / (France) Éric Winogradsky defeated (United States) Todd Nelson / (The Bahamas) Roger Smith, 6–2, 7–6.

== See also ==
- Connors–McEnroe rivalry
