= 1988 Geneva Open – Doubles =

Doubles
- 1988 Geneva Open

Final
- Champions: (Iran) Mansour Bahrami (Czechoslovakia) Tomáš Šmíd
- Runners-up: (Argentina) Gustavo Luza (Argentina) Guillermo Pérez Roldán
- Score: 6–4, 6–3

Events
Singles	Doubles
← 1987 ·	Geneva Open	· 1989 →

Ricardo Acioly and Luiz Mattar were the defending champions, but Acioly did not participate this year. Mattar partnered Ronnie Båthman, losing in the semifinals.

Mansour Bahrami and Tomáš Šmíd won the title, defeating Gustavo Luza and Guillermo Pérez Roldán 6–4, 6–3 in the final.

== Seeds ==
1. (Switzerland) Claudio Mezzadri / (Uruguay) Diego Pérez (first round)
2. (Iran) Mansour Bahrami / (Czechoslovakia) Tomáš Šmíd (champions)
3. (United States) Brett Dickinson / (New Zealand) Steve Guy (first round)
4. (Sweden) Ronnie Båthman / (Brazil) Cássio Motta (semifinals)

== Draw ==
=== Key ===
- Q = Qualifier
- WC = Wild card
- LL = Lucky loser
- Alt = Alternate
- SE = Special exempt
- PR = Protected ranking
- ITF = ITF entry
- JE = Junior exempt
- w/o = Walkover
- r = Retired
- d = Defaulted
- SR = Special ranking

=== Draw ===
First round
1	(Switzerland) C Mezzadri (Uruguay) D Pérez	6	4	3
(Spain) J Arrese (Spain) A Tous	2	6	6
(Czechoslovakia) S Birner (Czechoslovakia) M Vajda	1	6
(Peru) P Arraya (Socialist Federal Republic of Yugoslavia) B Orešar	6	7
3	(United States) B Dickinson (New Zealand) S Guy	2	3
(Argentina) G Luza (Argentina) G Pérez Roldán	6	6
(Spain) J Colas (Spain) D de Miguel	6	1
(West Germany) T Meinecke (West Germany) A Thoms	7	6
(Switzerland) S Medem (India) Srinivasan Vasudevan	4	4
(Socialist Federal Republic of Yugoslavia) I Flego (Netherlands) M Koevermans	6	6
(Romania) F Segărceanu (Switzerland) Marc Walder	4	2
4	(Sweden) R Båthman (Brazil) C Motta	6	6
(Switzerland) Stephane Oberer (Switzerland) M Rosset	5	0
(Argentina) E Bengoechea (Chile) P Rebolledo	7	6
(Argentina) H de la Peña (Sweden) M Gustafsson	2	7	4
2	(Iran) M Bahrami (Czechoslovakia) T Šmíd	6	5	6

Quarterfinals
(Spain) J Arrese (Spain) A Tous	5	6	4
(Peru) P Arraya (Socialist Federal Republic of Yugoslavia) B Orešar	7	3	6
(Argentina) G Luza (Argentina) G Pérez Roldán	4	6	6
(West Germany) T Meinecke (West Germany) A Thoms	6	3	4
(Socialist Federal Republic of Yugoslavia) I Flego (Netherlands) M Koevermans	2	2
4	(Sweden) R Båthman (Brazil) C Motta	6	6
(Argentina) E Bengoechea (Chile) P Rebolledo	4	6	4
2	(Iran) M Bahrami (Czechoslovakia) T Šmíd	6	4	6

Semifinals
(Peru) P Arraya (Socialist Federal Republic of Yugoslavia) B Orešar	2	3
(Argentina) G Luza (Argentina) G Pérez Roldán	6	6
4	(Sweden) R Båthman (Brazil) C Motta	6	0	3
2	(Iran) M Bahrami (Czechoslovakia) T Šmíd	4	6	6

Final
(Argentina) G Luza (Argentina) G Pérez Roldán	4	3
2	(Iran) M Bahrami (Czechoslovakia) T Šmíd	6	6
