= 1988 Geneva Open =

- Date: 19–26 September
- Edition: 9th
- Category: Grand Prix
- Draw: 32S / 16D
- Prize money: $190,000
- Surface: Clay / outdoor
- Location: Geneva, Switzerland

Champions

Singles
- (Czechoslovakia) Marián Vajda

Doubles
- (Iran) Mansour Bahrami / (Czechoslovakia) Tomáš Šmíd
- Geneva Open

The 1988 Geneva Open was a men's tennis tournament played on outdoor clay courts that was part of the 1988 Nabisco Grand Prix. It was played at Geneva in Switzerland from 19 September through 26 September 1988. Unseeded Marián Vajda won the single title.

== Finals ==
=== Singles ===
(Czechoslovakia) Marián Vajda defeated (Sweden) Kent Carlsson 6–4, 6–4

- It was Vajda's only singles title of the year and the 2nd and last of his career.

=== Doubles ===
(Iran) Mansour Bahrami / (Czechoslovakia) Tomáš Šmíd defeated (Argentina) Gustavo Luza / (Argentina) Guillermo Pérez Roldán 6–4, 6–3

- It was Bahrami's only title of the year and the 1st of his career. It was Šmíd's 1st title of the year and the 59th of his career.
