= 1988 Grand Prix de Tennis de Toulouse – Doubles =

Doubles
- 1988 Grand Prix de Tennis de Toulouse

Final
- Champions: (Netherlands) Tom Nijssen (West Germany) Ricki Osterthun
- Runners-up: (Iran) Mansour Bahrami (France) Guy Forget
- Score: 6–3, 6–4

Events
Singles	Doubles
← 1987 ·	Grand Prix de Tennis de Toulouse	· 1989 →

The 1988 Grand Prix de Tennis de Toulouse was a men's tennis tournament played on indoor carpet in Toulouse, France that was part of the Regular Series of the 1988 Grand Prix tennis circuit. It was the seventh edition of the tournament and was held from 10 October – 16 October.

== Seeds ==
Champion seeds are indicated in bold text while text in italics indicates the round in which those seeds were eliminated.

1. (United Kingdom) Jeremy Bates / (Denmark) Michael Mortensen (first round)
2. (United States) Kelly Jones / (Netherlands) Michiel Schapers (first round)
3. (Czechoslovakia) Tomáš Šmíd / (Czechoslovakia) Milan Šrejber (semifinals)
4. (Uruguay) Marcelo Filippini / (Uruguay) Diego Pérez (quarterfinals)

== Draw ==
=== Key ===
- Q = Qualifier
- WC = Wild card
- LL = Lucky loser
- Alt = Alternate
- SE = Special exempt
- PR = Protected ranking
- ITF = ITF entry
- JE = Junior exempt
- w/o = Walkover
- r = Retired
- d = Defaulted
- SR = Special ranking

=== Finals ===
First round
(Iran) **M Bahrami** **(France) G Forget**	**6**	**7**
1	(United Kingdom) J Bates (Denmark) M Mortensen	4	6
(West Germany) **U Riglewski** **(West Germany) C Saceanu**	**6**	**6**
(Brazil) I Kley (Brazil) F Roese	3	3
3	(Czechoslovakia) **T Šmíd** **(Czechoslovakia) M Šrejber**	**7**	**6**
(Sweden) M Gustafsson (Italy) D Nargiso	6	4
(France) **J-M Piacentile** **(France) É Winogradsky**	**7**	5	**6**
(Brazil) D Campos (Argentina) J Frana	6	**7**	3
(Sweden) **J Gunnarsson** **(Sweden) N Kroon**	**6**	**6**
(France) L Courteau (France) J Potier	3	4
4	(Uruguay) **M Filippini** **(Uruguay) D Pérez**	4	**6**	**6**
(Senegal) Y Doumbia (Sweden) M Tideman	**6**	2	4
(Australia) **C Limberger** **(Czechoslovakia) M Vajda**	**7**	**7**
(France) H Leconte (Romania) I Năstase	5	6
(Netherlands) **T Nijssen** **(West Germany) R Osterthun**	**7**	4	**7**
2	(United States) Kelly Jones (Netherlands) M Schapers	6	**6**	6

Quarterfinals
(Iran) **M Bahrami** **(France) G Forget**	**7**	**6**
(West Germany) U Riglewski (West Germany) C Saceanu	5	3
3	(Czechoslovakia) **T Šmíd** **(Czechoslovakia) M Šrejber**	4	**6**	**6**
(France) J-M Piacentile (France) É Winogradsky	**6**	1	4
(Sweden) **J Gunnarsson** **(Sweden) N Kroon**	**6**	**7**
4	(Uruguay) M Filippini (Uruguay) D Pérez	4	6
(Australia) C Limberger (Czechoslovakia) M Vajda	3	0
(Netherlands) **T Nijssen** **(West Germany) R Osterthun**	**6**	**6**

Semifinals
(Iran) **M Bahrami** **(France) G Forget**	5	**7**	**6**
3	(Czechoslovakia) T Šmíd (Czechoslovakia) M Šrejber	**7**	5	3
(Sweden) J Gunnarsson (Sweden) N Kroon	**7**	6	3
(Netherlands) **T Nijssen** **(West Germany) R Osterthun**	5	**7**	**6**

Final
(Iran) M Bahrami (France) G Forget	3	4
(Netherlands) **T Nijssen** **(West Germany) R Osterthun**	**6**	**6**
