= 1988 Grand Prix de Tennis de Toulouse – Singles =

Singles
- 1988 Grand Prix de Tennis de Toulouse

Final
- Champion: (United States) Jimmy Connors
- Runner-up: (Soviet Union) Andrei Chesnokov
- Score: 6–2, 6–0

Details
- Draw: 32
- Seeds: 8

Events
Singles	Doubles
← 1987 ·	Grand Prix de Tennis de Toulouse	· 1989 →

The 1988 Grand Prix de Tennis de Toulouse was a men's tennis tournament played on indoor carpet courts in Toulouse, France that was part of the Regular Series of the 1988 Grand Prix tennis circuit. It was the seventh edition of the tournament and was held from 10 October – 16 October.

== Seeds ==
Champion seeds are indicated in bold text while text in italics indicates the round in which those seeds were eliminated.

1. (France) Henri Leconte (quarterfinals)
2. (United States) **Jimmy Connors (champion)**
3. (Soviet Union) Andrei Chesnokov (final)
4. (Sweden) Jonas Svensson (second round)
5. (Sweden) Mikael Pernfors (first round)
6. (Switzerland) Jakob Hlasek (semifinals)
7. (Sweden) Magnus Gustafsson (second round)
8. (Netherlands) Michiel Schapers (quarterfinals)

== Draw ==
=== Key ===
- Q = Qualifier
- WC = Wild card
- LL = Lucky loser
- Alt = Alternate
- SE = Special exempt
- PR = Protected ranking
- ITF = ITF entry
- JE = Junior exempt
- w/o = Walkover
- r = Retired
- d = Defaulted
- SR = Special ranking

=== Finals ===
Semifinals
(Sweden) Christian Bergström	5	3
3	**(Soviet Union) Andrei Chesnokov**	**7**	**6**
6	(Switzerland) Jakob Hlasek	**7**	6	3
2	**(United States) Jimmy Connors**	5	**7**	**6**

Final
3	(Soviet Union) Andrei Chesnokov	2	0
2	**(United States) Jimmy Connors**	**6**	**6**

=== Top half ===
First round
1	**(France) H Leconte**	**6**	**6**
(Netherlands) T Nijssen	2	3
**(United Kingdom) J Bates**	**7**	2	**7**
(Australia) C Limberger	6	**6**	5
**(Sweden) C Bergström**	**6**	**6**
(France) A Boetsch	3	0
7	**(Sweden) M Gustafsson**	**6**	**6**
(France) J Potier	2	3
3	**(Soviet Union) A Chesnokov**	**6**	**6**
(Czechoslovakia) M Vajda	4	3
**(Sweden) N Kroon**	**6**	**6**
(Uruguay) M Filippini	1	2
**(France) G Forget**	**6**	**6**
(Uruguay) D Pérez	3	2
**(Czechoslovakia) T Šmíd**	**6**	5	**6**
5	(Sweden) M Pernfors	1	**7**	1

Second round
1	**(France) H Leconte**	**7**	**6**
(United Kingdom) J Bates	6	3
**(Sweden) C Bergström**	5	**7**	**6**
7	(Sweden) M Gustafsson	**7**	6	2
3	**(Soviet Union) A Chesnokov**	**6**	**6**
(Sweden) N Kroon	2	2
(France) G Forget	**6**	3	4
**(Czechoslovakia) T Šmíd**	3	**6**	**6**

Quarterfinals
1	(France) H Leconte	3	6
**(Sweden) C Bergström**	**6**	**7**
3	**(Soviet Union) A Chesnokov**	**6**	**6**
(Czechoslovakia) T Šmíd	4	2

Semifinals
(Sweden) C Bergström	5	3
3	**(Soviet Union) A Chesnokov**	**7**	**6**

=== Bottom half ===
First round
6	**(Switzerland) J Hlasek**	**6**	**6**
(Sweden) J Gunnarsson	4	4
**(Socialist Federal Republic of Yugoslavia) M Ostoja**	**7**	**6**
(France) É Winogradsky	5	3
**(Czechoslovakia) M Šrejber**	**6**	**7**
(Soviet Union) A Võsand	1	5
4	**(Sweden) J Svensson**	**6**	**6**
(West Germany) U Riglewski	2	4
8	**(Netherlands) M Schapers**	4	**6**	**6**
(West Germany) R Osterthun	**6**	1	3
**(Senegal) Y Doumbia**	4	**6**	**7**
(Italy) D Nargiso	**6**	3	5
**(Belgium) E Masso**	**6**	**6**
(Argentina) J Frana	4	4
2	**(United States) J Connors**	**6**	**6**
(West Germany) C Saceanu	4	3

Second round
6	**(Switzerland) J Hlasek**	**6**	**6**
(Socialist Federal Republic of Yugoslavia) M Ostoja	0	3
**(Czechoslovakia) M Šrejber**	**6**	**6**
4	(Sweden) J Svensson	3	3
8	**(Netherlands) M Schapers**	**6**	3	**7**
(Senegal) Y Doumbia	4	**6**	5
(Belgium) E Masso	**6**	4	3
2	**(United States) J Connors**	4	**6**	**6**

Quarterfinals
6	**(Switzerland) J Hlasek**	**7**	**6**
(Czechoslovakia) M Šrejber	5	4
8	(Netherlands) M Schapers	2	4
2	**(United States) J Connors**	**6**	**6**

Semifinals
6	(Switzerland) J Hlasek	**7**	6	3
2	**(United States) J Connors**	5	**7**	**6**
