= 1990 Grand Prix de Tennis de Toulouse – Singles =

Singles
- 1990 Grand Prix de Tennis de Toulouse

Final
- Champion: (Sweden) Jonas Svensson
- Runner-up: (France) Fabrice Santoro
- Score: 7–6^{(7–5)}, 6–2

Details
- Draw: 32
- Seeds: 8

Events
Singles	Doubles
← 1989 ·	Grand Prix de Tennis de Toulouse	· 1991 →

The 1990 Grand Prix de Tennis de Toulouse was a men's tennis tournament played on indoor carpet courts in Toulouse, France that was part of the World Series of the 1990 ATP Tour. It was the ninth edition of the tournament and was held from 1 October until 7 October 1990.

== Seeds ==
Champion seeds are indicated in bold text while text in italics indicates the round in which those seeds were eliminated.

1. (Ecuador) Andrés Gómez (first round)
2. (Soviet Union) Andrei Chesnokov (second round)
3. (United States) Jim Courier (second round)
4. (Israel) Amos Mansdorf (semifinals)
5. (France) Henri Leconte (second round)
6. (Haiti) Ronald Agénor (semifinals)
7. (Uruguay) Marcelo Filippini (first round)
8. (Sweden) **Jonas Svensson (champion)**

== Draw ==
=== Key ===
- Q = Qualifier
- WC = Wild card
- LL = Lucky loser
- Alt = Alternate
- SE = Special exempt
- PR = Protected ranking
- ITF = ITF entry
- JE = Junior exempt
- w/o = Walkover
- r = Retired
- d = Defaulted
- SR = Special ranking

=== Finals ===
Semifinals
**(France) Fabrice Santoro**	**7^{7}**	**6**
6	(Haiti) Ronald Agénor	6^{2}	3
8	**(Sweden) Jonas Svensson**	6^{5}	**6**	**6**
4	(Israel) Amos Mansdorf	**7^{7}**	4	3

Final
(France) Fabrice Santoro	6^{5}	2
8	**(Sweden) Jonas Svensson**	**7^{7}**	**6**

=== Top half ===
First round
**(France) F Santoro**	**6**	3	**6**
1	(Ecuador) A Gómez	2	**6**	3
**(Peru) J Yzaga**	**6**	3	**6**
(Iran) M Bahrami	4	**6**	3
**(Sweden) C Bergström**	3	**6**	**6**
(United States) P McEnroe	**6**	1	1
**(France) J-P Fleurian**	3	**6**	**6**
7	(Uruguay) M Filippini	**6**	2	3
3	**(United States) J Courier**	**6**	**6**
(Austria) A Antonitsch	3	2
**(Soviet Union) A Volkov**	**6**	**7**
(South Africa) G Muller	4	5
**(France) G Raoux**	**6**	**6**
(France) O Soules	3	2
6	**(Haiti) R Agénor**	**6**	**6**
(United States) J Connors	4	4

Second round
**(France) F Santoro**	**6**	**6**
(Peru) J Yzaga	2	2
**(Sweden) C Bergström**	**7**	**6**
(France) J-P Fleurian	6	4
3	(United States) J Courier	6	2
**(Soviet Union) A Volkov**	**7**	**6**
(France) G Raoux	**6**	3	2
6	**(Haiti) R Agénor**	3	**6**	**6**

Quarterfinals
**(France) F Santoro**	**7**	**6**
(Sweden) C Bergström	5	4
(Soviet Union) A Volkov	4	4
6	**(Haiti) R Agénor**	**6**	**6**

Semifinals
**(France) F Santoro**	**7^{7}**	**6**
6	(Haiti) R Agénor	6^{2}	3

=== Bottom half ===
First round
5	**(France) H Leconte**	4	**6**	**6**
(South Africa) C van Rensburg	**6**	3	3
**(Sweden) M Larsson**	**7**	3	**6**
(France) R Gilbert	6	**6**	3
**(Finland) V Paloheimo**	**7**	**6**
(France) T Benhabiles	6	2
8	**(Sweden) J Svensson**	**6**	3	**6**
(Brazil) L Mattar	2	**6**	3
4	**(Israel) A Mansdorf**	**6**	**6**
(Sweden) N Kulti	0	3
**(United States) J Arias**	4	**6**	**6**
(France) T Guardiola	**6**	4	2
**(France) Y Noah**	**6**	4	**7**
(Czechoslovakia) M Šrejber	4	**7**	6
2	**(Soviet Union) A Chesnokov**	2	**7**	**6**
(West Germany) M Stich	**6**	6	4

Second round
5	(France) Henri Leconte	6	**6**	3
**(Sweden) M Larsson**	**7**	2	**6**
(Finland) V Paloheimo	5	0
8	**(Sweden) J Svensson**	**7**	**6**
4	**(Israel) A Mansdorf**	**6**	**6**
(United States) J Arias	2	0
**(France) Y Noah**	w/o
2	(Soviet Union) A Chesnokov

Quarterfinals
(Sweden) M Larsson	4	**7^{7}**	3
8	**(Sweden) J Svensson**	**6**	6^{2}	**6**
4	**(Israel) A Mansdorf**	**6**	**6**
(France) Y Noah	4	4

Semifinals
8	**(Sweden) J Svensson**	6^{5}	**6**	**6**
4	(Israel) A Mansdorf	**7^{7}**	4	3
