= 1989 Geneva Open – Singles =

Singles
- 1989 Geneva Open

Final
- Champion: (Switzerland) Marc Rosset
- Runner-up: (Argentina) Guillermo Pérez Roldán
- Score: 6–4, 7–5

Details
- Draw: 32
- Seeds: 8

Events
Singles	Doubles
← 1988 ·	Geneva Open	· 1990 →

Marián Vajda was the defending champion, but did not participate this year.

Marc Rosset won the title, defeating Guillermo Pérez Roldán 6–4, 7–5 in the final.

== Seeds ==
1. (Argentina) Alberto Mancini (first round)
2. (Spain) Sergi Bruguera (first round)
3. (Ecuador) Andrés Gómez (second round)
4. (Argentina) Guillermo Pérez Roldán (final)
5. (Socialist Federal Republic of Yugoslavia) Goran Ivanišević (first round)
6. (Uruguay) Marcelo Filippini (second round)
7. (France) Guy Forget (first round)
8. (Socialist Federal Republic of Yugoslavia) Bruno Orešar (first round)

== Draw ==
=== Key ===
- Q = Qualifier
- WC = Wild card
- LL = Lucky loser
- Alt = Alternate
- SE = Special exempt
- PR = Protected ranking
- ITF = ITF entry
- JE = Junior exempt
- w/o = Walkover
- r = Retired
- d = Defaulted
- SR = Special ranking

=== Finals ===
Semifinals
WC	(Switzerland) Marc Rosset	6	3	6
(Argentina) Eduardo Bengoechea	2	6	2
4	(Argentina) Guillermo Pérez Roldán	6	6
Q	(Argentina) Francisco Yunis	4	3

Final
WC	(Switzerland) Marc Rosset	6	7
4	(Argentina) Guillermo Pérez Roldán	4	5

=== Top half ===
First round
1	(Argentina) A Mancini	7	4	6
Q	(Belgium) X Daufresne	5	6	7
(Brazil) C Motta	6	6
(Soviet Union) A Võsand	3	4
(United States) L Duncan	7	6
(Switzerland) C Mezzadri	6	1
WC	(Switzerland) M Rosset	6	6
7/WC	(France) G Forget	2	2
3	(Ecuador) A Gómez	6	6
(West Germany) A Mronz	1	1
(Argentina) E Bengoechea	7	6
(Spain) F Luna	5	4
(United States) J Brown	3	1
(Sweden) L Jönsson	6	6
(Austria) S Lochbihler	3	1
6	(Uruguay) M Filippini	6	6

Second round
Q	(Belgium) X Daufresne	6	6
(Brazil) C Motta	2	4
(United States) L Duncan	2	3
WC	(Switzerland) M Rosset	6	6
3	(Ecuador) A Gómez	6	6	5
(Argentina) E Bengoechea	7	4	7
(Sweden) L Jönsson	6	7
6	(Uruguay) M Filippini	3	5

Quarterfinals
Q	(Belgium) X Daufresne	1	2
WC	(Switzerland) M Rosset	6	6
(Argentina) E Bengoechea	6	6
(Sweden) L Jönsson	3	2

Semifinals
WC	(Switzerland) M Rosset	6	3	6
(Argentina) E Bengoechea	2	6	2

=== Bottom half ===
First round
5	(Socialist Federal Republic of Yugoslavia) G Ivanišević	3	6
(Spain) J Aguilera	6	7
WC	(Switzerland) R Stadler	6	5	2
(West Germany) U Riglewski	4	7	6
(Argentina) H de la Peña	6	0	0
(Argentina) R Argüello	2	6	6
(France) T Tulasne	5	3
4	(Argentina) G Pérez Roldán	7	6
8	(Socialist Federal Republic of Yugoslavia) B Orešar	2	1
Q	(Argentina) F Yunis	6	6
(Socialist Federal Republic of Yugoslavia) M Ostoja	6	0	7
Q	(Argentina) G Luza	3	6	6
(Canada) M Wostenholme	0	6	5
Q	(Chile) S Cortés	6	3	7
(Sweden) C Bergström	6	0	6
2	(Spain) S Bruguera	3	6	2

Second round
(Spain) J Aguilera	6	3	6
(West Germany) U Riglewski	1	6	4
(Argentina) R Argüello	6	2
4	(Argentina) G Pérez Roldán	7	6
Q	(Argentina) F Yunis	7	6
(Socialist Federal Republic of Yugoslavia) M Ostoja	5	3
Q	(Chile) S Cortés	5	6	6
(Sweden) C Bergström	7	2	1

Quarterfinals
(Spain) J Aguilera	0	2
4	(Argentina) G Pérez Roldán	6	6
Q	(Argentina) F Yunis	6	1	6
Q	(Chile) S Cortés	2	6	3

Semifinals
4	(Argentina) G Pérez Roldán	6	6
Q	(Argentina) F Yunis	4	3
