= 1990 Grand Prix de Tennis de Toulouse – Doubles =

Doubles
- 1990 Grand Prix de Tennis de Toulouse

Final
- Champions: (United Kingdom) Neil Broad (South Africa) Gary Muller
- Runners-up: (Denmark) Michael Mortensen (Netherlands) Michiel Schapers
- Score: 7–6, 6–4

Details
- Draw: 16
- Seeds: 4

Events
Singles	Doubles
← 1989 ·	Grand Prix de Tennis de Toulouse	· 1991 →

The 1990 Grand Prix de Tennis de Toulouse was a men's tennis tournament played on indoor carpet in Toulouse, France that was part of the World Series of the 1990 ATP Tour. It was the ninth edition of the tournament and was held from 1 October until 7 October 1990.

== Seeds ==
Champion seeds are indicated in bold text while text in italics indicates the round in which those seeds were eliminated.

1. (West Germany) Udo Riglewski / (West Germany) Michael Stich (quarterfinals)
2. (United Kingdom) **Neil Broad** / (South Africa) **Gary Muller (champions)**
3. (United States) Jim Courier / (United States) Patrick Galbraith (first round)
4. (United States) Patrick McEnroe / (Venezuela) Nicolás Pereira (semifinals)

== Draw ==
=== Key ===
- Q = Qualifier
- WC = Wild card
- LL = Lucky loser
- Alt = Alternate
- SE = Special exempt
- PR = Protected ranking
- ITF = ITF entry
- JE = Junior exempt
- w/o = Walkover
- r = Retired
- d = Defaulted
- SR = Special ranking

=== Finals ===
First round
1	(West Germany) **U Riglewski** **(West Germany) M Stich**	**7**	**6**
(Argentina) G Luza (Brazil) L Mattar	6	2
(Denmark) **M Mortensen** **(Netherlands) M Schapers**	**6**	6	**7**
(Iran) M Bahrami (France) É Winogradsky	4	**7**	6
4	(United States) **P McEnroe** **(Venezuela) N Pereira**	**6**	**6**
(Czechoslovakia) V Flégl (Italy) D Nargiso	4	4
(Czechoslovakia) **T Šmíd** **(Czechoslovakia) C Suk**	6	**6**	**6**
(France) H Leconte (France) Y Noah	**7**	4	3
(United States) **S DeVries** **(Australia) D Macpherson**	4	**6**	**7**
(Czechoslovakia) L Pimek (Czechoslovakia) M Šrejber	**6**	3	6
(United States) **J Brown** **(United States) S Melville**	6	**6**	**6**
3	(United States) J Courier (United States) P Galbraith	**7**	3	4
(South Africa) **S Kruger** **(South Africa) C van Rensburg**	**7**	4	**7**
(United States) C Beckman (United States) L Jensen	5	**6**	6
2	(United Kingdom) **N Broad** **(South Africa) G Muller**	**6**	**6**
(Sweden) P Henricsson (Sweden) N Utgren	3	1

Quarterfinals
1	(West Germany) U Riglewski (West Germany) M Stich
(Denmark) **M Mortensen** **(Netherlands) M Schapers**	w/o
4	(United States) **P McEnroe** **(Venezuela) N Pereira**	**6**	**6**
(Czechoslovakia) T Šmíd (Czechoslovakia) C Suk	2	0
(United States) **S DeVries** **(Australia) D Macpherson**	**6**	6	**6**
(United States) J Brown (United States) S Melville	4	**7**	2
(South Africa) S Kruger (South Africa) C van Rensburg	3	3
2	(United Kingdom) **N Broad** **(South Africa) G Muller**	**6**	**6**

Semifinals
(Denmark) **M Mortensen** **(Netherlands) M Schapers**	**6**	**7**
4	(United States) P McEnroe (Venezuela) N Pereira	3	6
(United States) S DeVries (Australia) D Macpherson	3	4
2	(United Kingdom) **N Broad** **(South Africa) G Muller**	**6**	**6**

Final
(Denmark) M Mortensen (Netherlands) M Schapers	6	4
2	(United Kingdom) **N Broad** **(South Africa) G Muller**	**7**	**6**
