= 1989 Grand Prix de Tennis de Toulouse – Doubles =

Doubles
- 1989 Grand Prix de Tennis de Toulouse

Final
- Champions: (Iran) Mansour Bahrami (France) Éric Winogradsky
- Runners-up: (United States) Todd Nelson (The Bahamas) Roger Smith
- Score: 6–2, 7–6

Events
Singles	Doubles
← 1988 ·	Grand Prix de Tennis de Toulouse	· 1990 →

The 1989 Grand Prix de Tennis de Toulouse was a men's tennis tournament played on indoor carpet in Toulouse, France that was part of the Regular Series of the 1989 Grand Prix tennis circuit. It was the eighth edition of the tournament and was held from 9 October – 15 October.

== Seeds ==
Champion seeds are indicated in bold text while text in italics indicates the round in which those seeds were eliminated.

1. (United States) John McEnroe / (Italy) Diego Nargiso (semifinals)
2. (Peru) Carlos di Laura / (Uruguay) Marcelo Filippini (quarterfinals)
3. (Iran) **Mansour Bahrami** / (France) **Éric Winogradsky (Champions)**
4. (Argentina) Javier Frana / (Venezuela) Nicolás Pereira (quarterfinals)

== Draw ==
=== Key ===
- Q = Qualifier
- WC = Wild card
- LL = Lucky loser
- Alt = Alternate
- SE = Special exempt
- PR = Protected ranking
- ITF = ITF entry
- JE = Junior exempt
- w/o = Walkover
- r = Retired
- d = Defaulted
- SR = Special ranking

=== Finals ===
First round
1	(United States) **J McEnroe** **(Italy) D Nargiso**	**6**	**6**
(France) G Forget (Switzerland) H Günthardt	3	2
(Soviet Union) **Ģ Dzelde** **(Netherlands) M Schapers**	**6**	**6**
(Spain) JF Altur (Spain) J Arrese	2	3
3	(Iran) **M Bahrami** **(France) É Winogradsky**	**6**	**6**
(Spain) JC Báguena (Spain) B Uribe	4	4
(Sweden) **D Engel** **(Sweden) F Nilsson**	**6**	3	**6**
(Italy) U Colombini (Uruguay) D Pérez	3	**6**	3
(United States) **T Nelson** **(The Bahamas) R Smith**	3	**6**	**6**
(United States) B Dickinson (United States) M Ozer	**6**	3	2
4	(Argentina) **J Frana** **(Venezuela) N Pereira**	**6**	**7**
(United Kingdom) A Castle (United States) J Canter	4	6
(Romania) **I Năstase** **(Sweden) J Svensson**	4	**6**	**6**
(Sweden) M Gustafsson (Canada) M Laurendeau	**6**	3	4
2	(Peru) **C di Laura** **(Uruguay) M Filippini**	**6**	**6**
(Brazil) D Marcelino (Belgium) E Masso	2	2

Quarterfinals
1	(United States) **J McEnroe** **(Italy) D Nargiso**	**7**	**6**
(Soviet Union) Ģ Dzelde (Netherlands) M Schapers	6	1
3	(Iran) **M Bahrami** **(France) É Winogradsky**	**7**	6	**6**
(Sweden) D Engel (Sweden) F Nilsson	6	**7**	3
(United States) **T Nelson** **(The Bahamas) R Smith**	**7**	**6**
4	(Argentina) J Frana (Venezuela) N Pereira	5	3
(Romania) **I Năstase** **(Sweden) J Svensson**	**6**	**6**
2	(Peru) C di Laura (Uruguay) M Filippini	3	3

Semifinals
1	(United States) J McEnroe (Italy) D Nargiso	0	4
3	(Iran) **M Bahrami** **(France) É Winogradsky**	**6**	**6**
(United States) **T Nelson** **(The Bahamas) R Smith**	**6**	**7**
(Romania) I Năstase (Sweden) J Svensson	4	6

Final
3	(Iran) **M Bahrami** **(France) É Winogradsky**	**6**	**7**
(United States) T Nelson (The Bahamas) R Smith	2	6
