= 1988 Geneva Open – Singles =

Singles
- 1988 Geneva Open

Final
- Champion: (Czechoslovakia) Marián Vajda
- Runner-up: (Sweden) Kent Carlsson
- Score: 6–4, 6–4

Details
- Draw: 32
- Seeds: 8

Events
Singles	Doubles
← 1987 ·	Geneva Open	· 1989 →

Claudio Mezzadri was the defending champion, but lost in the second round this year.

Marián Vajda won the title, defeating Kent Carlsson 6–4, 6–4 in the final.

== Seeds ==
1. (Sweden) Kent Carlsson (final)
2. (Argentina) Guillermo Pérez Roldán (first round)
3. (Spain) Jordi Arrese (quarterfinals)
4. (Sweden) Magnus Gustafsson (first round)
5. (Switzerland) Claudio Mezzadri (second round)
6. (Czechoslovakia) Tomáš Šmíd (first round)
7. (Spain) Fernando Luna (quarterfinals)
8. (Socialist Federal Republic of Yugoslavia) Bruno Orešar (second round)

== Draw ==
=== Key ===
- Q = Qualifier
- WC = Wild card
- LL = Lucky loser
- Alt = Alternate
- SE = Special exempt
- PR = Protected ranking
- ITF = ITF entry
- JE = Junior exempt
- w/o = Walkover
- r = Retired
- d = Defaulted
- SR = Special ranking

=== Finals ===
Semifinals
1	(Sweden) Kent Carlsson	6	6
(Argentina) Horacio de la Peña	2	2
(Argentina) Eduardo Bengoechea	5	1
(Czechoslovakia) Marián Vajda	7	6

Final
1	(Sweden) Kent Carlsson	4	4
(Czechoslovakia) Marián Vajda	6	6

=== Top half ===
First round
1	(Sweden) K Carlsson	6	6
Q	(Sweden) R Båthman	1	3
(Uruguay) D Pérez	6	6	4
WC	(Switzerland) R Stadler	4	7	6
WC	(Switzerland) M Rosset	6	2	2
(West Germany) T Meinecke	1	6	6
WC	(West Germany) A Thoms	3	1
7	(Spain) F Luna	6	6
4	(Sweden) M Gustafsson	4	4
(Sweden) C Bergström	6	6
Q	(Socialist Federal Republic of Yugoslavia) I Flego	6	6	7
Q	(Hungary) Z Kuhárszky	7	4	6
Q	(Netherlands) M Koevermans	7	4	6
(Argentina) H de la Peña	6	6	7
(Sweden) J Gunnarsson	7	6
6	(Czechoslovakia) T Šmíd	6	4

Second round
1	(Sweden) K Carlsson	6	1	6
WC	(Switzerland) R Stadler	2	6	0
(West Germany) T Meinecke	6	2
7	(Spain) F Luna	7	6
(Sweden) C Bergström	6	6
Q	(Socialist Federal Republic of Yugoslavia) I Flego	2	2
(Argentina) H de la Peña	7	6
(Sweden) J Gunnarsson	6	2

Quarterfinals
1	(Sweden) K Carlsson	6	6
7	(Spain) F Luna	1	2
(Sweden) C Bergström	2	5
(Argentina) H de la Peña	6	7

Semifinals
1	(Sweden) K Carlsson	6	6
(Argentina) H de la Peña	2	2

=== Bottom half ===
First round
5	(Switzerland) C Mezzadri	6	6
(Belgium) E Masso	4	2
(Argentina) E Bengoechea	6	6
(Spain) J Aguilera	1	1
(Spain) A Tous	6	3	4
(Spain) J Colas	2	6	6
(Romania) F Segărceanu	6	1
3	(Spain) J Arrese	7	6
8	(Socialist Federal Republic of Yugoslavia) B Orešar	7	6
(New Zealand) S Guy	6	1
(France) J Potier	6	6	5
(Chile) P Rebolledo	2	7	7
(Peru) P Arraya	6	6	6
(Brazil) C Motta	7	0	1
(Czechoslovakia) M Vajda	6	6	6
2	(Argentina) G Pérez Roldán	4	7	3

Second round
5	(Switzerland) C Mezzadri	2	2
(Argentina) E Bengoechea	6	6
(Spain) J Colas	1	3
3	(Spain) J Arrese	6	6
8	(Socialist Federal Republic of Yugoslavia) B Orešar	6	2	4
(Chile) P Rebolledo	1	6	6
(Peru) P Arraya	6	3	3
(Czechoslovakia) M Vajda	3	6	6

Quarterfinals
(Argentina) E Bengoechea	6	6
3	(Spain) J Arrese	1	2
(Chile) P Rebolledo	3	2
(Czechoslovakia) M Vajda	6	6

Semifinals
(Argentina) E Bengoechea	5	1
(Czechoslovakia) M Vajda	7	6
