= 1989 Geneva Open =

- Date: 11–17 September
- Edition: 10th
- Category: Grand Prix
- Draw: 32S / 16D
- Prize money: $190,000
- Surface: Clay / outdoor
- Location: Geneva, Switzerland

Champions

Singles
- (Switzerland) Marc Rosset

Doubles
- (Ecuador) Andrés Gómez / (Argentina) Alberto Mancini
- Geneva Open

The 1989 Geneva Open was a men's tennis tournament played on outdoor clay courts that was part of the 1989 Nabisco Grand Prix. It was played at Geneva in Switzerland from 11 September through 17 September 1989. Marc Rosset, who entered the event on a wildcard, won the singles title

== Finals ==
=== Singles ===
(Switzerland) Marc Rosset defeated (Argentina) Guillermo Pérez Roldán 6–4, 7–5

- It was Rosset's only title of the year and the 1st of his career.

=== Doubles ===
(Ecuador) Andrés Gómez / (Argentina) Alberto Mancini defeated (Iran) Mansour Bahrami / (Argentina) Guillermo Pérez Roldán 6–3, 7–5

- It was Gómez's 4th title of the year and the 50th of his career. It was Mancini's 4th title of the year and the 6th of his career.
