= 1991 Grand Prix de Tennis de Toulouse – Doubles =

Doubles
- 1991 Grand Prix de Tennis de Toulouse

Final
- Champions: (Netherlands) Tom Nijssen (Czechoslovakia) Cyril Suk
- Runners-up: (United Kingdom) Jeremy Bates (United States) Kevin Curren
- Score: 4–6, 6–3, 7–6

Details
- Draw: 16
- Seeds: 4

Events
Singles	Doubles
← 1990 ·	Grand Prix de Tennis de Toulouse	· 1992 →

The 1991 Grand Prix de Tennis de Toulouse was a men's tennis tournament played on indoor carpet in Toulouse, France that was part of the World Series of the 1991 ATP Tour. It was the tenth edition of the tournament and was held from 30 September until 6 October 1991.

== Seeds ==
Champion seeds are indicated in bold text while text in italics indicates the round in which those seeds were eliminated.

1. (United Kingdom) Neil Broad / (South Africa) Stefan Kruger (quarterfinals)
2. (Netherlands) **Tom Nijssen** / (Czechoslovakia) **Cyril Suk (champions)**
3. (Sweden) Ronnie Båthman / (Sweden) Rikard Bergh (quarterfinals)
4. (Spain) Tomás Carbonell / (Australia) David Macpherson (first round)

== Draw ==
=== Key ===
- Q = Qualifier
- WC = Wild card
- LL = Lucky loser
- Alt = Alternate
- ITF = ITF entry
- PR = Protected ranking
- SR = Special ranking
- SE = Special exempt
- JE = Junior exempt
- JR = Junior Accelerator Programme entrant
- CO = College Accelerator Programme entrant
- NG = Next Gen Accelerator Program entrant
- w/o = Walkover
- r = Retired
- d = Defaulted

=== Finals ===
First round
1	(United Kingdom) **N Broad** **(South Africa) S Kruger**	**7**	**6**
(United States) J Brown (United States) S Melville	5	3
(France) **C Pioline** **(Switzerland) M Rosset**	**6**	3	**6**
(United States) K Kinnear (South Africa) B Talbot	3	**6**	3
(United Kingdom) **J Bates** **(United States) K Curren**	6	**6**	**6**
4	(Spain) T Carbonell (Australia) D Macpherson	**7**	3	3
(Netherlands) **HJ Davids** **(Czechoslovakia) L Pimek**	**6**	**6**
(United States) C Beckman (United States) S Salumaa	2	3
(France) **J-P Fleurian** **(France) G Raoux**	**7**	5	**6**
(France) A Boetsch (France) F Santoro	6	**7**	3
3	(Sweden) **R Båthman** **(Sweden) R Bergh**	**6**	**6**
(Mexico) J Lozano (Argentina) G Luza	2	4
(Iran) **M Bahrami** **(France) O Delaître**	**7**	4	**6**
(Netherlands) R Krajicek (Czechoslovakia) D Vacek	6	**6**	4
2	(Netherlands) **T Nijssen** **(Czechoslovakia) C Suk**	**6**	**6**
(Sweden) M Gustafsson (Sweden) J Svensson	2	2

Quarterfinals
1	(United Kingdom) N Broad (South Africa) S Kruger	**6**	3	4
(France) **C Pioline** **(Switzerland) M Rosset**	1	**6**	**6**
(United Kingdom) **J Bates** **(United States) K Curren**	**6**	3	**6**
(Netherlands) HJ Davids (Czechoslovakia) L Pimek	3	**6**	3
(France) **J-P Fleurian** **(France) G Raoux**	**7**	1	**6**
3	(Sweden) R Båthman (Sweden) R Bergh	6	**6**	4
(Iran) M Bahrami (France) O Delaître	5	2
2	(Netherlands) **T Nijssen** **(Czechoslovakia) C Suk**	**7**	**6**

Semifinals
(France) C Pioline (Switzerland) M Rosset	**6**	4	4
(United Kingdom) **J Bates** **(United States) K Curren**	4	**6**	**6**
(France) J-P Fleurian (France) G Raoux	4	5
2	(Netherlands) **T Nijssen** **(Czechoslovakia) C Suk**	**6**	**7**

Final
(United Kingdom) J Bates (United States) K Curren	**6**	3	6
2	(Netherlands) **T Nijssen** **(Czechoslovakia) C Suk**	4	**6**	**7**
