= 2018 Australian Open – Day-by-day summaries =

The 2018 Australian Open described in detail, in the form of day-by-day summaries.

== Day 1 (15 January) ==
- Seeds out:
  - Men's Singles: (United States) Jack Sock [8], (South Africa) Kevin Anderson [11], (United States) John Isner [16], (France) Lucas Pouille [18], (Germany) Philipp Kohlschreiber [27]
  - Women's Singles: (United States) Venus Williams [5], (United States) CoCo Vandeweghe [10], (United States) Sloane Stephens [13], (Slovakia) Dominika Cibulková [24], (China) Peng Shuai [25], (Russia) Ekaterina Makarova [31]
- Schedule of Play

Matches on main courts
Matches on Rod Laver Arena
Event	Winner	Loser	Score
Women's Singles 1st Round	(Latvia) Jeļena Ostapenko [7]	(Italy) Francesca Schiavone	6–1, 6–4
Women's Singles 1st Round	(Switzerland) Belinda Bencic	(United States) Venus Williams [5]	6–3, 7–5
Men's Singles 1st Round	(Bulgaria) Grigor Dimitrov [3]	(Austria) Dennis Novak [Q]	6–3, 6–2, 6–1
Men's Singles 1st Round	(Spain) Rafael Nadal [1]	(Dominican Republic) Víctor Estrella Burgos	6–1, 6–1, 6–1
Women's Singles 1st Round	(Australia) Daria Gavrilova [23]	(United States) Irina Falconi [Q]	6–1, 6–1
Matches on Margaret Court Arena
Event	Winner	Loser	Score
Women's Singles 1st Round	(China) Zhang Shuai	(United States) Sloane Stephens [13]	2–6, 7–6^{(7–2)}, 6–2
Men's Singles 1st Round	(Australia) Matthew Ebden	(United States) John Isner [16]	6–4, 3–6, 6–3, 6–3
Women's Singles 1st Round	(Puerto Rico) Monica Puig	(Australia) Samantha Stosur	4–6, 7–6^{(8–6)}, 6–4
Women's Singles 1st Round	(Denmark) Caroline Wozniacki [2]	(Romania) Mihaela Buzărnescu	6–2, 6–3
Men's Singles 1st Round	(France) Jo-Wilfried Tsonga [15]	(United States) Kevin King [Q]	6–4, 6–4, 6–1
Matches on Melbourne Arena
Event	Winner	Loser	Score
Women's Singles 1st Round	(Germany) Julia Görges [12]	(United States) Sofia Kenin	6–4, 6–4
Women's Singles 1st Round	(Hungary) Tímea Babos	(United States) CoCo Vandeweghe [10]	7–6^{(7–4)}, 6–2
Men's Singles 1st Round	(Croatia) Marin Čilić [6]	(Canada) Vasek Pospisil [Q]	6–2, 6–2, 4–6, 7–6^{(7–5)}
Men's Singles 1st Round	(Australia) Nick Kyrgios [17]	(Brazil) Rogério Dutra Silva	6–1, 6–2, 6–4
Coloured background indicates a night match
Day matches began at 11 am, whilst night matches began at 7 pm AEDT

== Day 2 (16 January) ==
- Seeds out:
  - Men's Singles: (Spain) Roberto Bautista Agut [20], (Canada) Milos Raonic [22], (Germany) Mischa Zverev [32]
  - Women's Singles: (France) Kristina Mladenovic [11], (Czech Republic) Petra Kvitová [27]
- Schedule of Play

Matches on main courts
Matches on Rod Laver Arena
Event	Winner	Loser	Score
Women's Singles 1st Round	(Czech Republic) Karolína Plíšková [6]	(Paraguay) Verónica Cepede Royg	6–3, 6–4
Men's Singles 1st Round	(Germany) Alexander Zverev [4]	(Italy) Thomas Fabbiano	6–1, 7–6^{(7–5)}, 7–5
Women's Singles 1st Round	(Romania) Simona Halep [1]	(Australia) Destanee Aiava [WC]	7–6^{(7–5)}, 6–1
Men's Singles 1st Round	(Switzerland) Roger Federer [2]	(Slovenia) Aljaž Bedene	6–3, 6–4, 6–3
Women's Singles 1st Round	(Australia) Ashleigh Barty [18]	(Belarus) Aryna Sabalenka	6–7^{(2–7)}, 6–4, 6–4
Matches on Margaret Court Arena
Event	Winner	Loser	Score
Women's Singles 1st Round	(France) Caroline Garcia [8]	(Germany) Carina Witthöft	7–5, 6–3
Women's Singles 1st Round	(Russia) Maria Sharapova	(Germany) Tatjana Maria	6–1, 6–4
Men's Singles 1st Round	(Serbia) Novak Djokovic [14]	(United States) Donald Young	6–1, 6–2, 6–4
Women's Singles 1st Round	(Spain) Garbiñe Muguruza [3]	(France) Jessika Ponchet [WC]	6–4, 6–3
Men's Singles 1st Round	(Argentina) Juan Martín del Potro [12]	(United States) Frances Tiafoe	6–3, 6–4, 6–3
Matches on Melbourne Arena
Event	Winner	Loser	Score
Women's Singles 1st Round	(United Kingdom) Johanna Konta [9]	(United States) Madison Brengle	6–3, 6–1
Women's Singles 1st Round	(Germany) Angelique Kerber [21]	(Germany) Anna-Lena Friedsam [PR]	6–0, 6–4
Men's Singles 1st Round	(Switzerland) Stan Wawrinka [9]	(Lithuania) Ričardas Berankis [PR]	6–3, 6–4, 2–6, 7–6^{(7–2)}
Men's Singles 1st Round	(Czech Republic) Tomáš Berdych [19]	(Australia) Alex de Minaur [WC]	6–3, 3–6, 6–0, 6–1
Coloured background indicates a night match
Day matches began at 11 am, whilst night matches began at 7 pm AEDT

== Day 3 (17 January) ==
- 15 year old Marta Kostyuk become the youngest player to reach a grand slam third round since Mirjana Lučić-Baroni at the 1997 US Open.
- The second round match between Daria Gavrilova and Elise Mertens began at 11.59pm became the latest match to begin at in Australian Open history. This surpassing the previous record of 11.58pm set by Grigor Dimitrov and Richard Gasquet in 2017.
- Seeds out:
  - Men's Singles: (Uruguay) Pablo Cuevas [31]
  - Women's Singles: (Germany) Julia Görges [12], (Russia) Anastasia Pavlyuchenkova [15], (Russia) Daria Kasatkina [22], (Australia) Daria Gavrilova [23]
  - Men's Doubles: (Mexico) Santiago González / (Chile) Julio Peralta [13], (Croatia) Ivan Dodig / (Spain) Fernando Verdasco [14]
  - Women's Doubles: (Slovenia) Andreja Klepač / (Spain) María José Martínez Sánchez [9]
- Schedule of Play

Matches on main courts
Matches on Rod Laver Arena
Event	Winner	Loser	Score
Women's Singles 2nd Round	(Ukraine) Elina Svitolina [4]	(Czech Republic) Kateřina Siniaková	4–6, 6–2, 6–1
Women's Singles 2nd Round	(Denmark) Caroline Wozniacki [2]	(Croatia) Jana Fett	3–6, 6–2, 7–5
Men's Singles 2nd Round	(Spain) Rafael Nadal [1]	(Argentina) Leonardo Mayer	6–3, 6–4, 7–6^{(7–4)}
Men's Singles 2nd Round	(Bulgaria) Grigor Dimitrov [3]	(United States) Mackenzie McDonald [Q]	4–6, 6–2, 6–4, 0–6, 8–6
Women's Singles 2nd Round	(Belgium) Elise Mertens	(Australia) Daria Gavrilova [23]	7–5, 6–3
Matches on Margaret Court Arena
Event	Winner	Loser	Score
Women's Singles 2nd Round	(Ukraine) Marta Kostyuk [Q]	(Australia) Olivia Rogowska [WC]	6–3, 7–5
Men's Singles 2nd Round	(France) Jo-Wilfried Tsonga [15]	(Canada) Denis Shapovalov	3–6, 6–3, 1–6, 7–6^{(7–4)}, 7–5
Women's Singles 2nd Round	(Latvia) Jeļena Ostapenko [7]	(China) Duan Yingying	6–3, 3–6, 6–4
Women's Singles 2nd Round	(France) Alizé Cornet	(Germany) Julia Görges [12]	6–4, 6–3
Men's Singles 2nd Round	(Ukraine) Alexandr Dolgopolov	(Australia) Matthew Ebden	7–6^{(7–0)}, 6–3, 6–4
Matches on Melbourne Arena
Event	Winner	Loser	Score
Women's Singles 2nd Round	(Ukraine) Kateryna Bondarenko	(Russia) Anastasia Pavlyuchenkova [15]	6–2, 6–4
Women's Singles 2nd Round	(Thailand) Luksika Kumkhum [Q]	(Switzerland) Belinda Bencic	6–1, 6–3
Men's Singles 2nd Round	(Croatia) Marin Čilić [6]	(Portugal) João Sousa	6–1, 7–5, 6–2
Men's Singles 2nd Round	(Australia) Nick Kyrgios [17]	(Serbia) Viktor Troicki	7–5, 6–4, 7–6^{(7–2)}
Coloured background indicates a night match
Day matches began at 11 am, whilst night matches began at 7 pm AEDT

== Day 4 (18 January) ==
- Seeds out:
  - Men's Singles: (Belgium) David Goffin [7], (Switzerland) Stan Wawrinka [9], (United States) Sam Querrey [13]
  - Women's Singles: (Spain) Garbiñe Muguruza [3], (United Kingdom) Johanna Konta [9], (Latvia) Anastasija Sevastova [14], (Russia) Elena Vesnina [16], (Croatia) Mirjana Lučić-Baroni [28]
  - Men's Doubles: (South Africa) Raven Klaasen / (New Zealand) Michael Venus [8], (Uruguay) Pablo Cuevas / (Argentina) Horacio Zeballos [12]
  - Women's Doubles: (Netherlands) Kiki Bertens / (Sweden) Johanna Larsson [7]
- Schedule of Play

Matches on main courts
Matches on Rod Laver Arena
Event	Winner	Loser	Score
Women's Singles 2nd Round	(Russia) Maria Sharapova	(Latvia) Anastasija Sevastova [14]	6–1, 7–6^{(7–4)}
Women's Singles 2nd Round	(Chinese Taipei) Hsieh Su-wei	(Spain) Garbiñe Muguruza [3]	7–6^{(7–1)}, 6–4
Men's Singles 2nd Round	(Serbia) Novak Djokovic [14]	(France) Gaël Monfils	4–6, 6–3, 6–1, 6–3
Women's Singles 2nd Round	(Australia) Ashleigh Barty [18]	(Italy) Camila Giorgi	5–7, 6–4, 6–1
Men's Singles 2nd Round	(Switzerland) Roger Federer [2]	(Germany) Jan-Lennard Struff	6–4, 6–4, 7–6^{(7–4)}
Matches on Margaret Court Arena
Event	Winner	Loser	Score
Men's Singles 2nd Round	(Austria) Dominic Thiem [5]	(United States) Denis Kudla [Q]	6–7^{(6–8)}, 3–6, 6–3, 6–2, 6–3
Women's Singles 2nd Round	(Germany) Angelique Kerber [21]	(Croatia) Donna Vekić	6–4, 6–1
Women's Singles 2nd Round	(United States) Madison Keys [17]	(Russia) Ekaterina Alexandrova	6–0, 6–1
Women's Singles 2nd Round	(Romania) Simona Halep [1]	(Canada) Eugenie Bouchard	6–2, 6–2
Men's Singles 2nd Round	(United States) Tennys Sandgren	(Switzerland) Stan Wawrinka [9]	6–2, 6–1, 6–4
Matches on Melbourne Arena
Event	Winner	Loser	Score
Women's Singles 2nd Round	(France) Caroline Garcia [8]	(Czech Republic) Markéta Vondroušová	6–7^{(3–7)}, 6–2, 8–6
Women's Singles 2nd Round	(Czech Republic) Karolína Plíšková [6]	(Brazil) Beatriz Haddad Maia	6–1, 6–1
Men's Singles 2nd Round	(Argentina) Juan Martín del Potro [12]	(Russia) Karen Khachanov	6–4, 7–6^{(7–4)}, 6–7^{(0–7)}, 6–4
Men's Singles 2nd Round	(Germany) Alexander Zverev [4]	(Germany) Peter Gojowczyk	6–1, 6–3, 4–6, 6–3
Coloured background indicates a night match
Day matches began at 11 am, whilst night matches began at 7 pm AEDT

== Day 5 (19 January) ==
- Seeds out:
  - Men's Singles: (France) Jo-Wilfried Tsonga [15], (Luxembourg) Gilles Müller [23], (Bosnia and Herzegovina) Damir Džumhur [28], (Russia) Andrey Rublev [30]
  - Women's Singles: (Latvia) Jeļena Ostapenko [7], (Netherlands) Kiki Bertens [30]
  - Men's Doubles: (Finland) Henri Kontinen / (Australia) John Peers [2], (Spain) Feliciano López / (Spain) Marc López [9]
- Schedule of Play

Matches on main courts
Matches on Rod Laver Arena
Event	Winner	Loser	Score
Women's Singles 3rd Round	(Croatia) Petra Martić	(Thailand) Luksika Kumkhum [Q]	6–3, 3–6, 7–5
Women's Singles 3rd Round	(Ukraine) Elina Svitolina [4]	(Ukraine) Marta Kostyuk [Q]	6–2, 6–2
Men's Singles 3rd Round	(Bulgaria) Grigor Dimitrov [3]	(Russia) Andrey Rublev [30]	6–3, 4–6, 6–4, 6–4
Men's Singles 3rd Round	(Australia) Nick Kyrgios [17]	(France) Jo-Wilfried Tsonga [15]	7–6^{(7–5)}, 4–6, 7–6^{(8–6)}, 7–6^{(7–5)}
Women's Singles 3rd Round	(Denmark) Caroline Wozniacki [2]	(Netherlands) Kiki Bertens [30]	6–4, 6–3
Matches on Margaret Court Arena
Event	Winner	Loser	Score
Women's Singles 3rd Round	(Czech Republic) Denisa Allertová [Q]	(Poland) Magda Linette	6–1, 6–4
Men's Singles 3rd Round	(Spain) Pablo Carreño Busta [10]	(Luxembourg) Gilles Müller [23]	7–6^{(7–4)}, 4–6, 7–5, 7–5
Women's Singles 3rd Round	(Slovakia) Magdaléna Rybáriková [19]	(Ukraine) Kateryna Bondarenko	7–5, 3–6, 6–1
Men's Singles 3rd Round	(Spain) Rafael Nadal [1]	(Bosnia and Herzegovina) Damir Džumhur [28]	6–1, 6–3, 6–1
Women's Singles 3rd Round	(Estonia) Anett Kontaveit [32]	(Latvia) Jeļena Ostapenko [7]	6–3, 1–6, 6–3
Matches on Melbourne Arena
Event	Winner	Loser	Score
Men's Doubles 2nd Round	(United States) Bob Bryan [6] (United States) Mike Bryan [6]	(Belarus) Max Mirnyi (Austria) Philipp Oswald	6–7^{(5–7)}, 6–4, 6–4
Women's Singles 3rd Round	(Belgium) Elise Mertens	(France) Alizé Cornet	7–5, 6–4
Men's Singles 3rd Round	(Italy) Andreas Seppi	(Croatia) Ivo Karlović	6–3, 7–6^{(7–4)}, 6–7^{(3–7)}, 6–7^{(5–7)}, 9–7
Men's Singles 3rd Round	(Croatia) Marin Čilić [6]	(United States) Ryan Harrison	7–6^{(7–4)}, 6–3, 7–6^{(7–4)}
Coloured background indicates a night match
Day matches began at 11 am, whilst night matches began at 7 pm AEDT

== Day 6 (20 January) ==
- The Simona Halep/Lauren Davis match lasted three hours and 45 minutes, equalling the Australian Open's record for most games played in a women's match at 48. The 142-minute third set lasted longer than all but six female singles matches to date in the tournament.
- Chung Hyeon became the first South Korean player (male or female) to reach the fourth round at the Grand Slam.
- Seeds out:
  - Men's Singles: (Germany) Alexander Zverev [4], (Argentina) Juan Martín del Potro [12], (Spain) Albert Ramos Viñolas [21], (France) Adrian Mannarino [26], (France) Richard Gasquet [29]
  - Women's Singles: (Australia) Ashleigh Barty [18], (Poland) Agnieszka Radwańska [26], (Czech Republic) Lucie Šafářová [29]
  - Men's Doubles: (Netherlands) Jean-Julien Rojer / (Romania) Horia Tecău [3], (France) Pierre-Hugues Herbert / (France) Nicolas Mahut [4], (United Kingdom) Jamie Murray / (Brazil) Bruno Soares [5]
  - Women's Doubles: (Australia) Ashleigh Barty / (Australia) Casey Dellacqua [3], (Poland) Alicja Rosolska / (United States) Abigail Spears [15]
- Schedule of Play

Matches on main courts
Matches on Rod Laver Arena
Event	Winner	Loser	Score
Women's Singles 3rd Round	(Romania) Simona Halep [1]	(United States) Lauren Davis	4–6, 6–4, 15–13
Men's Singles 3rd Round	(South Korea) Chung Hyeon	(Germany) Alexander Zverev [4]	5–7, 7–6^{(7–3)}, 2–6, 6–3, 6–0
Women's Singles 3rd Round	(Germany) Angelique Kerber [21]	(Russia) Maria Sharapova	6–1, 6–3
Men's Singles 3rd Round	(Switzerland) Roger Federer [2]	(France) Richard Gasquet [29]	6–2, 7–5, 6–4
Matches on Margaret Court Arena
Event	Winner	Loser	Score
Women's Singles 3rd Round	(United States) Madison Keys [17]	(Romania) Ana Bogdan	6–3, 6–4
Women's Singles 3rd Round	(Czech Republic) Karolína Plíšková [6]	(Czech Republic) Lucie Šafářová [29]	7–6^{(8–6)}, 7–5
Men's Singles 3rd Round	(Austria) Dominic Thiem [5]	(France) Adrian Mannarino [26]	6–4, 6–2, 7–5
Women's Singles 3rd Round	(Japan) Naomi Osaka	(Australia) Ashleigh Barty [18]	6–4, 6–2
Men's Singles 3rd Round	(Serbia) Novak Djokovic [14]	(Spain) Albert Ramos Viñolas [21]	6–2, 6–3, 6–3
Women's Singles 3rd Round	(Chinese Taipei) Hsieh Su-wei	(Poland) Agnieszka Radwańska [26]	6–2, 7–5
Matches on Melbourne Arena
Event	Winner	Loser	Score
Men's Legends' Doubles Round Robin	(Sweden) Thomas Johansson (Sweden) Mats Wilander	(United States) John McEnroe (United States) Patrick McEnroe	4–3^{(5–3)}, 1–4, 4–2
Women's Singles 3rd Round	(France) Caroline Garcia [8]	(Belarus) Aliaksandra Sasnovich	6–3, 5–7, 6–2
Men's Singles 3rd Round	(Italy) Fabio Fognini [25]	(France) Julien Benneteau	3–6, 6–2, 6–1, 4–6, 6–3
Men's Singles 3rd Round	(Czech Republic) Tomáš Berdych [19]	(Argentina) Juan Martín del Potro [12]	6–3, 6–3, 6–2
Coloured background indicates a night match
Day matches began at 11 am, whilst night matches began at 7 pm AEDT

== Day 7 (21 January) ==
- Seeds out:
  - Men's Singles: (Spain) Pablo Carreño Busta [10], (Australia) Nick Kyrgios [17], (Argentina) Diego Schwartzman [24]
  - Women's Singles: (Slovakia) Magdaléna Rybáriková [19], (Estonia) Anett Kontaveit [32]
  - Women's Doubles: (United States) Raquel Atawo / (Germany) Anna-Lena Grönefeld [12], (United States) Nicole Melichar / (Czech Republic) Květa Peschke [13]
- Schedule of Play

Matches on main courts
Matches on Rod Laver Arena
Event	Winner	Loser	Score
Women's Singles 4th Round	(Spain) Carla Suárez Navarro	(Estonia) Anett Kontaveit [32]	4–6, 6–4, 8–6
Women's Singles 4th Round	(Denmark) Caroline Wozniacki [2]	(Slovakia) Magdaléna Rybáriková [19]	6–3, 6–0
Men's Singles 4th Round	(Spain) Rafael Nadal [1]	(Argentina) Diego Schwartzman [24]	6–3, 6–7^{(4–7)}, 6–3, 6–3
Men's Singles 4th Round	(Bulgaria) Grigor Dimitrov [3]	(Australia) Nick Kyrgios [17]	7–6^{(7–3)}, 7–6^{(7–4)}, 4–6, 7–6^{(7–4)}
Women's Singles 4th Round	(Ukraine) Elina Svitolina [4]	(Czech Republic) Denisa Allertová [Q]	6–3, 6–0
Matches on Margaret Court Arena
Event	Winner	Loser	Score
Women's Doubles 3rd Round	(Romania) Irina-Camelia Begu [10] (Romania) Monica Niculescu [10]	(Ukraine) Nadiia Kichenok (Australia) Anastasia Rodionova	4–1, ret.
Men's Singles 4th Round	(Croatia) Marin Čilić [6]	(Spain) Pablo Carreño Busta [10]	6–7^{(2–7)}, 6–3, 7–6^{(7–0)}, 7–6^{(7–3)}
Women's Singles 4th Round	(Belgium) Elise Mertens	(Croatia) Petra Martić	7–6^{(7–5)}, 7–5
Mixed Doubles 1st Round	(Hungary) Tímea Babos [5] (India) Rohan Bopanna [5]	(Australia) Ellen Perez [WC] (Australia) Andrew Whittington [WC]	6–2, 6–4
Matches on Melbourne Arena
Event	Winner	Loser	Score
Men's Legends' Doubles Round Robin	(United States) John McEnroe (United States) Patrick McEnroe	(France) Mansour Bahrami (France) Fabrice Santoro	2–4, 4–0, 4–3^{(5–1)}
Men's Doubles 3rd Round	(United States) Bob Bryan [6] (United States) Mike Bryan [6]	(France) Jérémy Chardy (France) Fabrice Martin	6–7^{(2–7)}, 7–6^{(7–5)}, 6–3
Men's Doubles 3rd Round	(Australia) Sam Groth [WC] (Australia) Lleyton Hewitt [WC]	(Spain) Pablo Andújar [PR] (Spain) Albert Ramos Viñolas [PR]	3–3, ret.
Men's Singles 4th Round	(United Kingdom) Kyle Edmund	(Italy) Andreas Seppi	6–7^{(4–7)}, 7–5, 6–2, 6–3
Mixed Doubles 1st Round	(Netherlands) Demi Schuurs (Netherlands) Jean-Julien Rojer	(Australia) Monique Adamczak [WC] (Australia) Matthew Ebden [WC]	7–5, 6–4
Coloured background indicates a night match
Day matches began at 11 am, whilst night matches began at 7 pm AEDT

== Day 8 (22 January) ==
- Seeds out:
  - Men's Singles: (Austria) Dominic Thiem [5], (Serbia) Novak Djokovic [14], (Italy) Fabio Fognini [25]
  - Women's Singles: (France) Caroline Garcia [8], (Czech Republic) Barbora Strýcová [20]
  - Men's Doubles: (India) Rohan Bopanna / (France) Édouard Roger-Vasselin [10], (United States) Rajeev Ram / (India) Divij Sharan [16]
  - Women's Doubles: (Japan) Shuko Aoyama / (China) Yang Zhaoxuan [11], (Chinese Taipei) Chan Hao-ching / (Slovenia) Katarina Srebotnik [14], (Czech Republic) Barbora Krejčíková / (Czech Republic) Kateřina Siniaková [16]
  - Mixed Doubles: (Chinese Taipei) Latisha Chan / (United Kingdom) Jamie Murray [1], (Australia) Casey Dellacqua / (Australia) John Peers [2], (Czech Republic) Květa Peschke / (Finland) Henri Kontinen [4]
- Schedule of Play

Matches on main courts
Matches on Rod Laver Arena
Event	Winner	Loser	Score
Women's Singles 4th Round	(United States) Madison Keys [17]	(France) Caroline Garcia [8]	6–3, 6–2
Women's Singles 4th Round	(Germany) Angelique Kerber [21]	(Chinese Taipei) Hsieh Su-wei	4–6, 7–5, 6–2
Men's Singles 4th Round	(Switzerland) Roger Federer [2]	(Hungary) Márton Fucsovics	6–4, 7–6^{(7–3)}, 6–2
Men's Singles 4th Round	(South Korea) Chung Hyeon	(Serbia) Novak Djokovic [14]	7–6^{(7–4)}, 7–5, 7–6^{(7–3)}
Women's Singles 4th Round	(Czech Republic) Karolína Plíšková [6]	(Czech Republic) Barbora Strýcová [20]	6–7^{(5–7)}, 6–3, 6–2
Matches on Margaret Court Arena
Event	Winner	Loser	Score
Women's Doubles 3rd Round	(Chinese Taipei) Latisha Chan [1] (Czech Republic) Andrea Sestini Hlaváčková [1]	(Chinese Taipei) Chan Hao-ching [14] (Slovenia) Katarina Srebotnik [14]	6–3, 6–2
Men's Singles 4th Round	(Czech Republic) Tomáš Berdych [19]	(Italy) Fabio Fognini [25]	6–1, 6–4, 6–4
Women's Doubles 3rd Round	(Hungary) Tímea Babos [5] (France) Kristina Mladenovic [5]	(Switzerland) Viktorija Golubic (Serbia) Nina Stojanović	7–5, 6–2
Women's Singles 4th Round	(Romania) Simona Halep [1]	(Japan) Naomi Osaka	6–3, 6–2
Matches on Melbourne Arena
Event	Winner	Loser	Score
Men's Legends' Doubles Round Robin	(South Africa) Wayne Ferreira (Croatia) Goran Ivanišević	(Sweden) Thomas Enqvist (Australia) Todd Woodbridge	4–2, 4–3^{(5–2)}
Men's Doubles 3rd Round	(Poland) Łukasz Kubot [1] (Brazil) Marcelo Melo [1]	(United States) Rajeev Ram [16] (India) Divij Sharan [16]	3–6, 7–6^{(7–4)}, 6–4
Men's Doubles 3rd Round	(Japan) Ben McLachlan (Germany) Jan-Lennard Struff	(Spain) Pablo Carreño Busta (Spain) Guillermo García López	6–4, 7–6^{(7–5)}
Men's Singles 4th Round	(United States) Tennys Sandgren	(Austria) Dominic Thiem [5]	6–2, 4–6, 7–6^{(7–4)}, 6–7^{(7–9)}, 6–3
Coloured background indicates a night match
Day matches began at 11 am, whilst night matches began at 7 pm AEDT

== Day 9 (23 January) ==
- Seeds out:
  - Men's Singles: (Spain) Rafael Nadal [1], (Bulgaria) Grigor Dimitrov [3]
  - Women's Singles: (Ukraine) Elina Svitolina [4]
  - Men's Doubles: (Poland) Łukasz Kubot / (Brazil) Marcelo Melo [1], (Poland) Marcin Matkowski / (Pakistan) Aisam-ul-Haq Qureshi [15]
  - Women's Doubles: (Chinese Taipei) Latisha Chan / (Czech Republic) Andrea Sestini Hlaváčková [1], (Czech Republic) Lucie Šafářová / (Czech Republic) Barbora Strýcová [4], (Canada) Gabriela Dabrowski / (China) Xu Yifan [6]
  - Mixed Doubles: (Chinese Taipei) Chan Hao-ching / (New Zealand) Michael Venus [7]
- Schedule of Play

Matches on main courts
Matches on Rod Laver Arena
Event	Winner	Loser	Score
Men's Doubles Quarterfinals	(United States) Bob Bryan [6] (United States) Mike Bryan [6]	(Poland) Marcin Matkowski [15] (Pakistan) Aisam-ul-Haq Qureshi [15]	6–1, 6–4
Women's Singles Quarterfinals	(Belgium) Elise Mertens	(Ukraine) Elina Svitolina [4]	6–4, 6–0
Men's Singles Quarterfinals	(United Kingdom) Kyle Edmund	(Bulgaria) Grigor Dimitrov [3]	6–4, 3–6, 6–3, 6–4
Men's Singles Quarterfinals	(Croatia) Marin Čilić [6]	(Spain) Rafael Nadal [1]	3–6, 6–3, 6–7^{(5–7)}, 6–2, 2–0, retired
Women's Singles Quarterfinals	(Denmark) Caroline Wozniacki [2]	(Spain) Carla Suárez Navarro	6–0, 6–7^{(3–7)}, 6–2
Matches on Margaret Court Arena
Event	Winner	Loser	Score
Men's Legends' Doubles Round Robin	(Netherlands) Jacco Eltingh (Netherlands) Paul Haarhuis	(Sweden) Thomas Enqvist (Australia) Todd Woodbridge	4–1, 1–4, 4–3^{(5–4)}
Men's Doubles Quarterfinals	(Japan) Ben McLachlan (Germany) Jan-Lennard Struff	(Poland) Łukasz Kubot [1] (Brazil) Marcelo Melo [1]	6–4, 6–7^{(4–7)}, 7–6^{(7–5)}
Women's Doubles Quarterfinals	(Russia) Ekaterina Makarova [2] (Russia) Elena Vesnina [2]	(Canada) Gabriela Dabrowski [6] (China) Xu Yifan [6]	0–6, 6–1, 7–6^{(7–2)}
Mixed Doubles 2nd Round	(Czech Republic) Andrea Sestini Hlaváčková [6] (France) Édouard Roger-Vasselin [6]	(Ukraine) Nadiia Kichenok (Spain) Marcel Granollers	6–2, 7–5
Mixed Doubles 2nd Round	(Canada) Gabriela Dabrowski [8] (Croatia) Mate Pavić [8]	(Netherlands) Demi Schuurs (Netherlands) Jean-Julien Rojer	6–1, 6–3
Coloured background indicates a night match
Day matches began at 11 am, whilst night matches began at 7 pm AEDT

== Day 10 (24 January) ==
- Seeds out:
  - Men's Singles: (Czech Republic) Tomáš Berdych [19]
  - Women's Singles: (Czech Republic) Karolína Plíšková [6], (United States) Madison Keys [17]
  - Women's Doubles: (Chinese Taipei) Hsieh Su-wei / (China) Peng Shuai [8], (Romania) Irina-Camelia Begu / (Romania) Monica Niculescu [10]
- Schedule of Play

Matches on main courts
Matches on Rod Laver Arena
Event	Winner	Loser	Score
Women's Singles Quarterfinals	(Germany) Angelique Kerber [21]	(United States) Madison Keys [17]	6–1, 6–2
Men's Singles Quarterfinals	(South Korea) Chung Hyeon	(United States) Tennys Sandgren	6–4, 7–6^{(7–5)}, 6–3
Women's Singles Quarterfinals	(Romania) Simona Halep [1]	(Czech Republic) Karolína Plíšková [6]	6–3, 6–2
Men's Singles Quarterfinals	(Switzerland) Roger Federer [2]	(Czech Republic) Tomáš Berdych [19]	7–6^{(7–1)}, 6–3, 6–4
Matches on Margaret Court Arena
Event	Winner	Loser	Score
Men's Legends' Doubles Round Robin	(France) Mansour Bahrami (France) Fabrice Santoro	(Sweden) Thomas Johansson (Sweden) Mats Wilander	3–4^{(2–5)}, 4–1, 4–3^{(5–4)}
Women's Doubles Semifinals	(Hungary) Tímea Babos [5] (France) Kristina Mladenovic [5]	(Chinese Taipei) Hsieh Su-wei [8] (China) Peng Shuai [8]	6–4, 6–2
Men's Doubles Quarterfinals	(Austria) Oliver Marach [7] (Croatia) Mate Pavić [7]	(New Zealand) Marcus Daniell (United Kingdom) Dominic Inglot	6–4, 6–7^{(10–12)}, 7–6^{(7–5)}
Men's Doubles Quarterfinals	(Colombia) Juan Sebastián Cabal [11] (Colombia) Robert Farah [11]	(Australia) Sam Groth [WC] (Australia) Lleyton Hewitt [WC]	6–4, 7–5
Coloured background indicates a night match
Day matches began at 11 am, whilst night matches began at 7:30 pm AEDT

== Day 11 (25 January) ==
- Seeds out:
  - Women's Singles: (Germany) Angelique Kerber [21]
  - Men's Doubles: (United States) Bob Bryan / (United States) Mike Bryan [6]
  - Mixed Doubles: (Czech Republic) Andrea Sestini Hlaváčková / (France) Édouard Roger-Vasselin [6]
- Schedule of Play

Matches on main courts
Matches on Rod Laver Arena
Event	Winner	Loser	Score
Mixed Doubles Quarterfinals	(Spain) María José Martínez Sánchez (Brazil) Marcelo Demoliner	(Australia) Storm Sanders [WC] (Australia) Marc Polmans [WC]	7–5, 6–4
Women's Singles Semifinals	(Denmark) Caroline Wozniacki [2]	(Belgium) Elise Mertens	6–3, 7–6^{(7–2)}
Women's Singles Semifinals	(Romania) Simona Halep [1]	(Germany) Angelique Kerber [21]	6–3, 4–6, 9–7
Men's Singles Semifinals	(Croatia) Marin Čilić [6]	(United Kingdom) Kyle Edmund	6–2, 7–6^{(7–4)}, 6–2
Men's Doubles Semifinals	(Colombia) Juan Sebastián Cabal [11] (Colombia) Robert Farah [11]	(United States) Bob Bryan [6] (United States) Mike Bryan [6]	7–6^{(7–1)}, 7–5
Matches on Margaret Court Arena
Event	Winner	Loser	Score
Men's Legends' Doubles Round Robin	(France) Henri Leconte (Australia) Mark Philippoussis	(Sweden) Thomas Enqvist (Australia) Todd Woodbridge	4–3^{(5–2)}, 4–2
Men's Doubles Semifinals	(Austria) Oliver Marach [7] (Croatia) Mate Pavić [7]	(Japan) Ben McLachlan (Germany) Jan-Lennard Struff	4–6, 7–5, 7–6^{(7–4)}
Mixed Doubles Quarterfinals	(Russia) Ekaterina Makarova [3] (Brazil) Bruno Soares [3]	(Czech Republic) Andrea Sestini Hlaváčková [6] (France) Édouard Roger-Vasselin [6]	6–2, 4–6, [13–11]
Mixed Doubles Quarterfinals	(Canada) Gabriela Dabrowski [8] (Croatia) Mate Pavić [8]	(Sweden) Johanna Larsson (Netherlands) Matwé Middelkoop	6–3, 7–6^{(7–0)}
Coloured background indicates a night match
Day matches began at 11 am, whilst night matches began at 7:30 pm AEDT

== Day 12 (26 January) ==
- Seeds out:
  - Women's Doubles: (Russia) Ekaterina Makarova / (Russia) Elena Vesnina [2]
  - Mixed Doubles: (Russia) Ekaterina Makarova / (Brazil) Bruno Soares [3]
- Schedule of Play

Matches on main courts
Matches on Rod Laver Arena
Event	Winner	Loser	Score
Women's Doubles Final	(Hungary) Tímea Babos [5] (France) Kristina Mladenovic [5]	(Russia) Ekaterina Makarova [2] (Russia) Elena Vesnina [2]	6–4, 6–3
Men's Singles Semifinals	(Switzerland) Roger Federer [2]	(South Korea) Chung Hyeon	6–1, 5–2, retired
Matches on Margaret Court Arena
Event	Winner	Loser	Score
Mixed Doubles Semifinals	(Canada) Gabriela Dabrowski [8] (Croatia) Mate Pavić [8]	(Russia) Ekaterina Makarova [3] (Brazil) Bruno Soares [3]	6–1, 6–4
Mixed Doubles Semifinals	(Hungary) Tímea Babos [5] (India) Rohan Bopanna [5]	(Spain) María José Martínez Sánchez (Brazil) Marcelo Demoliner	7–5, 5–7, [10–6]
Coloured background indicates a night match
Day matches began at 3 pm, whilst night matches began at 7:30 pm AEDT

== Day 13 (27 January) ==
- Caroline Wozniacki became the first Danish player to win a Grand Slam singles title.
- Seeds out:
  - Women's Singles: (Romania) Simona Halep [1]
  - Men's Doubles: (Colombia) Juan Sebastián Cabal / (Colombia) Robert Farah [11]
- Schedule of Play

Matches on main courts
Matches on Rod Laver Arena
Event	Winner	Loser	Score
Women's Singles Final	(Denmark) Caroline Wozniacki [2]	(Romania) Simona Halep [1]	7–6^{(7–2)}, 3–6, 6–4
Men's Doubles Final	(Austria) Oliver Marach [7] (Croatia) Mate Pavić [7]	(Colombia) Juan Sebastián Cabal [11] (Colombia) Robert Farah [11]	6–4, 6–4
Coloured background indicates a night match
Night matches began at 7:30 pm AEDT

== Day 14 (28 January) ==
- Seeds out:
  - Men's Singles: (Croatia) Marin Čilić [6]
  - Mixed Doubles: (Hungary) Tímea Babos / (India) Rohan Bopanna [5]
- Schedule of Play

Matches on main courts
Matches on Rod Laver Arena
Event	Winner	Loser	Score
Mixed Doubles Final	(Canada) Gabriela Dabrowski [8] (Croatia) Mate Pavić [8]	(Hungary) Tímea Babos [5] (India) Rohan Bopanna [5]	2–6, 6–4, [11–9]
Men's Singles Final	(Switzerland) Roger Federer [2]	(Croatia) Marin Čilić [6]	6–2, 6–7^{(5–7)}, 6–3, 3–6, 6–1
Coloured background indicates a night match
Day matches began at 4 pm, whilst night matches began at 7:30 pm AEDT
