= 1987 Geneva Open =

Tennis tournament

- Date: 14–20 September
- Edition: 8th
- Category: Grand Prix
- Draw: 32S / 16D
- Prize money: $200,000
- Surface: Clay / outdoor
- Location: Geneva, Switzerland

Champions

Singles
- (Switzerland) Claudio Mezzadri

Doubles
- (Brazil) Ricardo Acioly / (Brazil) Luiz Mattar
- Geneva Open

The 1987 Geneva Open was a men's tennis tournament played on clay courts that was part of the 1987 Nabisco Grand Prix. It was played at Geneva in Switzerland from 14 September through 20 September 1987. Unseeded Claudio Mezzadri won the singles title.

== Finals ==
=== Singles ===
(Switzerland) Claudio Mezzadri defeated (Czechoslovakia) Tomáš Šmíd 6–4, 7–5

- It was Mezzadri's 2nd title of the year and the 2nd of his career.

=== Doubles ===
(Brazil) Ricardo Acioly / (Brazil) Luiz Mattar defeated (Iran) Mansour Bahrami / (Uruguay) Diego Pérez 3–6, 6–4, 6–2

- It was Acioly's only title of the year and the 2nd of his career. It was Mattar's 3rd title of the year and the 3rd of his career.
