= 1988 Grand Prix de Tennis de Toulouse =

- Date: 10–16 October
- Edition: 7th
- Category: Regular Series
- Draw: 32S / 16D
- Prize money: $225,000
- Surface: Carpet / indoor
- Location: Toulouse, France

Champions

Singles
- (United States) Jimmy Connors

Doubles
- (Netherlands) Tom Nijssen / (West Germany) Ricki Osterthun
- Grand Prix de Tennis de Toulouse

The 1988 Grand Prix de Tennis de Toulouse was a men's tennis tournament played on indoor carpet courts in Toulouse, France that was part of the Regular Series of the 1988 Grand Prix tennis circuit. It was the seventh edition of the tournament and was held from 10 October until 16 October 1988. Second-seeded Jimmy Connors won the singles title.

== Finals ==
=== Singles ===
(United States) Jimmy Connors defeated (Soviet Union) Andrei Chesnokov, 6–2, 6–0

- It was Connors' 2nd singles title of the year and the 107th of his career.

=== Doubles ===
(Netherlands) Tom Nijssen / (West Germany) Ricki Osterthun defeated. (Iran) Mansour Bahrami / (France) Guy Forget, 6–3, 6–4.
