= 1991 Grand Prix de Tennis de Toulouse – Singles =

Singles
- 1991 Grand Prix de Tennis de Toulouse

Final
- Champion: (France) Guy Forget
- Runner-up: (Israel) Amos Mansdorf
- Score: 6–2, 7–6

Details
- Draw: 32
- Seeds: 8

Events
Singles	Doubles
← 1990 ·	Grand Prix de Tennis de Toulouse	· 1992 →

The 1991 Grand Prix de Tennis de Toulouse was a men's tennis tournament played on indoor carpet courts in Toulouse, France that was part of the World Series of the 1991 ATP Tour. It was the tenth edition of the tournament and was held from 30 September until 6 October 1991.

== Seeds ==
Champion seeds are indicated in bold text while text in italics indicates the round in which those seeds were eliminated.

1. (France) **Guy Forget (champion)**
2. (Sweden) Magnus Gustafsson (first round)
3. (Switzerland) Jakob Hlasek (second round)
4. (Sweden) Jonas Svensson (first round)
5. (Soviet Union) Alexander Volkov (semifinals)
6. (United States) John McEnroe (quarterfinals)
7. (Switzerland) Marc Rosset (quarterfinals)
8. (United States) Patrick McEnroe (second round)

== Draw ==
=== Key ===
- Q = Qualifier
- WC = Wild card
- LL = Lucky loser
- Alt = Alternate
- ITF = ITF entry
- PR = Protected ranking
- SR = Special ranking
- SE = Special exempt
- JE = Junior exempt
- JR = Junior Accelerator Programme entrant
- CO = College Accelerator Programme entrant
- NG = Next Gen Accelerator Program entrant
- w/o = Walkover
- r = Retired
- d = Defaulted

=== Finals ===
Semifinals
1	**(France) Guy Forget**	**7**	3	**6**
(Netherlands) Richard Krajicek	6	**6**	4
5	(Soviet Union) Alexander Volkov	5	**7**	1
**(Israel) Amos Mansdorf**	**7**	5	**6**

Final
1	**(France) Guy Forget**	**6**	**7**
(Israel) Amos Mansdorf	2	6

=== Top half ===
First round
1	**(France) G Forget**	**6**	**6**
Q	(Sweden) J Carlsson	4	4
**(France) T Champion**	5	**7**	**6**
WC	(France) Y Noah	**7**	5	3
Q	**(Sweden) T Enqvist**	**6**	**6**
Q	(Belgium) L Pimek	1	2
7	**(Switzerland) M Rosset**	**6**	**6**
(France) F Santoro	1	3
3	**(Switzerland) J Hlasek**	**7**	**6**
WC	(France) T Guardiola	6	2
**(Netherlands) R Krajicek**	**6**	**6**
(France) F Fontang	2	0
**(Spain) T Carbonell**	6	**6**	**6**
(France) G Raoux	**7**	4	3
6	**(United States) J McEnroe**	3	**6**	**6**
WC	(France) A Boetsch	**6**	2	2

Second round
1	**(France) G Forget**	**6**	3	**6**
(France) T Champion	1	**6**	3
Q	(Sweden) T Enqvist	4	**6**	6
7	**(Switzerland) M Rosset**	**6**	1	**7**
3	(Switzerland) J Hlasek	2	4
**(Netherlands) R Krajicek**	**6**	**6**
(Spain) T Carbonell	1	4
6	**(United States) J McEnroe**	**6**	**6**

Quarterfinals
1	**(France) G Forget**	3	**6**	**6**
7	(Switzerland) M Rosset	**6**	3	3
**(Netherlands) R Krajicek**	**6**	**6**
6	(United States) J McEnroe	4	4

Semifinals
1	**(France) G Forget**	**7**	3	**6**
(Netherlands) R Krajicek	6	**6**	4

=== Bottom half ===
First round
5	**(Soviet Union) A Volkov**	3	**6**	**6**
(Sweden) N Kulti	**6**	2	3
Q	**(Netherlands) T Nijssen**	6	**7**	**6**
(Germany) C Saceanu	**7**	5	4
**(France) C Pioline**	**6**	**6**	**6**
(United States) K Curren	4	**7**	3
**(Haiti) R Agénor**	**6**	**7**
4	(Sweden) J Svensson	4	6
8	**(United States) P McEnroe**	3	**7**	**6**
(Italy) C Caratti	**6**	5	2
**(Sweden) C Bergström**	6	**6**	**6**
(France) J-P Fleurian	**7**	1	1
**(Germany) A Mronz**	**6**	4	**6**
(Germany) P Baur	4	**6**	1
**(Israel) A Mansdorf**	**6**	**6**
2	(Sweden) M Gustafsson	4	1

Second round
5	**(Soviet Union) A Volkov**	**7**	4	**6**
Q	(Netherlands) T Nijssen	5	**6**	4
**(France) C Pioline**	**7**	**7**
(Haiti) R Agénor	5	6
8	(United States) P McEnroe	3	5
**(Sweden) C Bergström**	**6**	**7**
(Germany) A Mronz	5	**6**	2
**(Israel) A Mansdorf**	**7**	4	**6**

Quarterfinals
5	**(Soviet Union) A Volkov**	5	**7**	**6**
(France) C Pioline	**7**	6	2
(Sweden) C Bergström	4	4
**(Israel) A Mansdorf**	**6**	**6**

Semifinals
5	(Soviet Union) A Volkov	5	**7**	1
**(Israel) A Mansdorf**	**7**	5	**6**
