= 1989 Grand Prix de Tennis de Toulouse – Singles =

Singles
- 1989 Grand Prix de Tennis de Toulouse

Final
- Champion: (United States) Jimmy Connors
- Runner-up: (United States) John McEnroe
- Score: 6–3, 6–3

Details
- Draw: 32
- Seeds: 8

Events
Singles	Doubles
← 1988 ·	Grand Prix de Tennis de Toulouse	· 1990 →

The 1989 Grand Prix de Tennis de Toulouse was a men's tennis tournament played on indoor carpet courts in Toulouse, France that was part of the Regular Series of the 1989 Grand Prix tennis circuit. It was the eighth edition of the tournament and was held from 9 October – 15 October.

== Seeds ==
Champion seeds are indicated in bold text while text in italics indicates the round in which those seeds were eliminated.

1. (United States) John McEnroe (final)
2. (United States) **Jimmy Connors (champion)**
3. (Soviet Union) Andrei Chesnokov (semifinals)
4. (Austria) Horst Skoff (semifinals)
5. (Spain) Jordi Arrese (second round)
6. (Italy) Omar Camporese (first round)
7. (France) Guy Forget (first round)
8. (Uruguay) Marcelo Filippini (first round)

== Draw ==
=== Key ===
- Q = Qualifier
- WC = Wild card
- LL = Lucky loser
- Alt = Alternate
- SE = Special exempt
- PR = Protected ranking
- ITF = ITF entry
- JE = Junior exempt
- w/o = Walkover
- r = Retired
- d = Defaulted
- SR = Special ranking

=== Finals ===
Semifinals
1	**(United States) John McEnroe**	**6**	**6**
4	(Austria) Horst Skoff	1	3
3	(Soviet Union) Andrei Chesnokov	**6**	3	1
2	**(United States) Jimmy Connors**	3	**6**	**6**

Final
1	(United States) John McEnroe	3	3
2	**(United States) Jimmy Connors**	**6**	**6**

=== Top half ===
First round
1	**(United States) J McEnroe**	4	**6**	**7**
(France) T Tulasne	**6**	1	6
**(India) R Krishnan**	**7**	4	**6**
(Czechoslovakia) M Šrejber	5	**6**	3
**(Uruguay) D Pérez**	**6**	2	**6**
(Italy) D Nargiso	2	**6**	4
**(Sweden) M Gustafsson**	**6**	4	**6**
7	(France) G Forget	4	**6**	3
4	**(Austria) H Skoff**	**6**	**6**
(France) L Barthez	2	4
**(France) É Winogradsky**	6	**6**	**6**
(Argentina) J Frana	**7**	4	4
**(Canada) M Laurendeau**	**7**	**7**
(Denmark) M Tauson	6	5
5	**(Spain) J Arrese**	**6**	**6**
(United Kingdom) C Bailey	1	4

Second round
1	**(United States) J McEnroe**	**7**	**6**
(India) R Krishnan	6	3
(Uruguay) D Pérez	3	3
**(Sweden) M Gustafsson**	**6**	**6**
4	**(Austria) H Skoff**	**7**	4	**6**
(France) É Winogradsky	6	**6**	1
**(Canada) M Laurendeau**	**6**	**6**
5	(Spain) J Arrese	3	2

Quarterfinals
1	**(United States) J McEnroe**	**7**	**6**
(Sweden) M Gustafsson	5	3
4	**(Austria) H Skoff**	**6**	**6**
(Canada) M Laurendeau	3	2

Semifinals
1	**(United States) J McEnroe**	**6**	**6**
4	(Austria) H Skoff	1	3

=== Bottom half ===
First round
**(France) F Santoro**	**6**	2	**6**
6	(Italy) O Camporese	2	**6**	3
**(Sweden) C Bergström**	**6**	**6**
(Netherlands) M Schapers	1	4
**(Spain) JF Altur**	**6**	**6**
(Soviet Union) A Võsand	3	3
3	**(Soviet Union) A Chesnokov**	**6**	**6**
(Venezuela) N Pereira	4	3
**(France) J Potier**	**6**	**6**
8	(Uruguay) M Filippini	4	1
**(United Kingdom) A Castle**	3	**6**	**6**
(United States) J Canter	**6**	2	3
**(West Germany) U Riglewski**	**7**	2	**6**
(Soviet Union) Ģ Dzelde	6	**6**	1
2	**(United States) J Connors**	**6**	**6**
(Sweden) J Carlsson	0	1

Second round
(France) F Santoro	5	3
**(Sweden) C Bergström**	**7**	**6**
(Spain) JF Altur	1	4
3	**(Soviet Union) A Chesnokov**	**6**	**6**
**(France) J Potier**	0	**7**	**6**
(United Kingdom) A Castle	**6**	6	2
(West Germany) U Riglewski	**6**	2	6
2	**(United States) J Connors**	2	**6**	**7**

Quarterfinals
(Sweden) C Bergström	4	3
3	**(Soviet Union) A Chesnokov**	**6**	**6**
(France) J Potier	3	1
2	**(United States) J Connors**	**6**	**6**

Semifinals
3	(Soviet Union) A Chesnokov	**6**	3	1
2	**(United States) J Connors**	3	**6**	**6**
