= 1991 Grand Prix de Tennis de Toulouse =

- Date: 30 September – 6 October
- Edition: 10th
- Category: World Series
- Draw: 32S / 16D
- Prize money: $260,000
- Surface: Carpet / indoor
- Location: Toulouse, France

Champions

Singles
- (France) Guy Forget

Doubles
- (Netherlands) Tom Nijssen / (Czechoslovakia) Cyril Suk
- Grand Prix de Tennis de Toulouse

The 1991 Grand Prix de Tennis de Toulouse was a men's tennis tournament played on indoor carpet courts in Toulouse, France that was part of the World Series of the 1991 ATP Tour. It was the tenth edition of the tournament and was held from 30 September until 6 October 1990. First-seeded Guy Forget won the singles title.

== Finals ==
=== Singles ===
(France) Guy Forget defeated (Israel) Amos Mansdorf, 6–2, 7–6

- It was Forget's 5th singles title of the year and the 8th of his career.

=== Doubles ===
(Netherlands) Tom Nijssen / (Czechoslovakia) Cyril Suk defeated (United Kingdom) Jeremy Bates / (United States) Kevin Curren, 4–6, 6–3, 7–6
