= 1989 Geneva Open – Doubles =

Doubles
- 1989 Geneva Open

Final
- Champions: (Ecuador) Andrés Gómez (Argentina) Alberto Mancini
- Runners-up: (Iran) Mansour Bahrami (Argentina) Guillermo Pérez Roldán
- Score: 6–3, 7–5

Details
- Draw: 16
- Seeds: 4

Events
Singles	Doubles
- Geneva Open

Mansour Bahrami and Tomáš Šmíd were the defending champions, but Šmíd did not participate this year. Bahrami partnered Guillermo Pérez Roldán, finishing runner-up.

Andrés Gómez and Alberto Mancini won the title, defeating Bahrami and Pérez-Roldán 6–3, 7–5 in the final.

== Seeds ==
1. (Brazil) Cássio Motta / (United States) Blaine Willenborg (quarterfinals)
2. (Iran) Mansour Bahrami / (Argentina) Guillermo Pérez Roldán (semifinals)
3. (Ecuador) Andrés Gómez / (Argentina) Alberto Mancini (champions)
4. (Sweden) Peter Svensson / (Sweden) Jörgen Windahl (first round)

== Draw ==
Key

- Q = Qualifier
- WC = Wild card
- LL = Lucky loser
- Alt = Alternate
- ITF = ITF entry
- PR = Protected ranking
- SR = Special ranking
- SE = Special exempt
- JE = Junior exempt
- JR = Junior Accelerator Programme entrant
- CO = College Accelerator Programme entrant
- NG = Next Gen Accelerator Program entrant
- w/o = Walkover
- r = Retired
- d = Defaulted

=== Draw ===
First round
1	(Brazil) C Motta (United States) B Willenborg	6	4	6
(Venezuela) A Mora (United States) M Ozer	0	6	4
(Australia) D Macpherson (Argentina) G Mirad	2	6	7
(Spain) S Bruguera (Socialist Federal Republic of Yugoslavia) G Ivanišević	6	4	6
3	(Ecuador) A Gómez (Argentina) A Mancini	7	7
(Argentina) F Blengino (Argentina) G Luza	5	5
(Switzerland) C Mezzadri (Switzerland) S Mezzadri	6	3	2
(Argentina) P Albano (Peru) P Arraya	3	6	6
(Switzerland) H Günthardt (Hungary) H Taróczy	6	6
WC	(Poland) W Fibak (Austria) T Muster	7	7
(Argentina) E Bengoechea (Uruguay) M Filippini	6	1	6
4	(Sweden) P Svensson (Sweden) J Windahl	4	6	2
(France) G Forget (West Germany) A Mronz	7	4	6
(Belgium) D Langaskens (Romania) I Năstase	5	6	3
(Israel) G Bloom (Socialist Federal Republic of Yugoslavia) B Orešar	6	6	3
2	(Iran) M Bahrami (Argentina) G Pérez Roldán	3	7	6

Quarterfinals
1	(Brazil) C Motta (United States) B Willenborg	6	6
(Australia) D Macpherson (Argentina) G Mirad	7	7
3	(Ecuador) A Gómez (Argentina) A Mancini	6	6
(Argentina) P Albano (Peru) P Arraya	3	2
WC	(Poland) W Fibak (Austria) T Muster	3	6	6
(Argentina) E Bengoechea (Uruguay) M Filippini	6	3	4
(France) G Forget (West Germany) A Mronz	6	5
2	(Iran) M Bahrami (Argentina) G Pérez Roldán	7	7

Semifinals
(Australia) D Macpherson (Argentina) G Mirad	4	4
3	(Ecuador) A Gómez (Argentina) A Mancini	6	6
WC	(Poland) W Fibak (Austria) T Muster	6	6	4
2	(Iran) M Bahrami (Argentina) G Pérez Roldán	3	7	6

Final
3	(Ecuador) A Gómez (Argentina) A Mancini	6	7
2	(Iran) M Bahrami (Argentina) G Pérez Roldán	3	5
