= 1987 Geneva Open – Doubles =

Doubles
- 1987 Geneva Open

Final
- Champions: (Brazil) Ricardo Acioly (Brazil) Luiz Mattar
- Runners-up: (Iran) Mansour Bahrami (Uruguay) Diego Pérez
- Score: 3–6, 6–4, 6–2

Events
Singles	Doubles
← 1986 ·	Geneva Open	· 1988 →

Andreas Maurer and Jörgen Windahl were the defending champions, but did not participate this year.

Ricardo Acioly and Luiz Mattar won the title, defeating Mansour Bahrami and Diego Pérez 3–6, 6–4, 6–2 in the final.

== Seeds ==
1. (Chile) Hans Gildemeister / (Ecuador) Andrés Gómez (semifinals)
2. (Switzerland) Claudio Mezzadri / (Czechoslovakia) Tomáš Šmíd (semifinals)
3. (Iran) Mansour Bahrami / (Uruguay) Diego Pérez (final)
4. (Sweden) Ronnie Båthman / (Sweden) Joakim Nyström (quarterfinals)

== Draw ==
=== Key ===
- Q = Qualifier
- WC = Wild card
- LL = Lucky loser
- Alt = Alternate
- SE = Special exempt
- PR = Protected ranking
- ITF = ITF entry
- JE = Junior exempt
- w/o = Walkover
- r = Retired
- d = Defaulted
- SR = Special ranking

=== Draw ===
First round
1	(Chile) H Gildemeister (Ecuador) A Gómez	6	6
WC	(Argentina) H de la Peña (Romania) I Năstase	2	4
(Australia) D Graham (United States) J Sobel	6	3	2
(Argentina) E Bengoechea (Austria) H Skoff	4	6	6
4	(Sweden) R Båthman (Sweden) J Nyström	4	6	6
(Australia) R Barlow (Australia) C Limberger	6	3	2
(Brazil) R Acioly (Brazil) L Mattar	6	6	6
(Sweden) C Allgårdh (Denmark) P Bastiansen	7	3	3
(Switzerland) S Mezzadri (Sweden) U Stenlund	2	3
(Argentina) G Luza (Argentina) G Tiberti	6	6
(Switzerland) R Hertzog (Switzerland) M Walder	3	4
3	(Iran) M Bahrami (Uruguay) D Pérez	6	6
(Haiti) R Agénor (United States) J Brown	1	2
(Poland) W Fibak (France) H Leconte	6	6
(South Africa) A Burrow (South Africa) D Maasdorp	6	2
2	(Switzerland) C Mezzadri (Czechoslovakia) T Šmíd	7	6

Quarterfinals
1	(Chile) H Gildemeister (Ecuador) A Gómez	w/o
(Argentina) E Bengoechea (Austria) H Skoff
4	(Sweden) R Båthman (Sweden) J Nyström	6	7	3
(Brazil) R Acioly (Brazil) L Mattar	7	6	6
(Argentina) G Luza (Argentina) G Tiberti	6	3	2
3	(Iran) M Bahrami (Uruguay) D Pérez	3	6	6
(Poland) W Fibak (France) H Leconte	4	6	3
2	(Switzerland) C Mezzadri (Czechoslovakia) T Šmíd	6	4	6

Semifinals
1	(Chile) H Gildemeister (Ecuador) A Gómez	3	2
(Brazil) R Acioly (Brazil) L Mattar	6	6
3	(Iran) M Bahrami (Uruguay) D Pérez	6	6
2	(Switzerland) C Mezzadri (Czechoslovakia) T Šmíd	2	4

Final
(Brazil) R Acioly (Brazil) L Mattar	3	6	6
3	(Iran) M Bahrami (Uruguay) D Pérez	6	4	2
