= 1987 Geneva Open – Singles =

Singles
- 1987 Geneva Open

Final
- Champion: (Switzerland) Claudio Mezzadri
- Runner-up: (Czechoslovakia) Tomáš Šmíd
- Score: 6–4, 7–5

Details
- Draw: 32
- Seeds: 8

Events
Singles	Doubles
- Geneva Open

Henri Leconte was the defending champion but lost in the second round this year.

Claudio Mezzadri won the title, defeating Tomáš Šmíd 6–4, 7–5 in the final.

== Seeds ==
1. (Ecuador) Andrés Gómez (semifinals)
2. (Sweden) Joakim Nyström (second round)
3. (France) Henri Leconte (second round)
4. (Argentina) Guillermo Pérez Roldán (quarterfinals)
5. (Argentina) Eduardo Bengoechea (second round)
6. (Sweden) Ulf Stenlund (semifinals)
7. (France) Tarik Benhabiles (first round)
8. (Austria) Horst Skoff (first round)

== Draw ==
Key

- Q = Qualifier
- WC = Wild card
- LL = Lucky loser
- Alt = Alternate
- ITF = ITF entry
- PR = Protected ranking
- SR = Special ranking
- SE = Special exempt
- JE = Junior exempt
- JR = Junior Accelerator Programme entrant
- CO = College Accelerator Programme entrant
- NG = Next Gen Accelerator Program entrant
- w/o = Walkover
- r = Retired
- d = Defaulted

=== Finals ===
Semifinals
1	(Ecuador) Andrés Gómez	6	6	0
(Czechoslovakia) Tomáš Šmíd	7	4	6
6	(Sweden) Ulf Stenlund	2	7	6
(Switzerland) Claudio Mezzadri	6	6	7

Final
(Czechoslovakia) Tomáš Šmíd	4	5
(Switzerland) Claudio Mezzadri	6	7

=== Top half ===
First round
1	(Ecuador) A Gómez	3	6	6
(Haiti) R Agénor	6	3	2
(Argentina) G Vilas	6	6
(Uruguay) D Pérez	4	1
LL	(South Africa) D Maasdorp	6	6
WC	(Switzerland) S Mezzadri	4	4
(France) T Tulasne	6	7
8	(Austria) H Skoff	4	5
4	(Argentina) G Pérez Roldán	7	7
(Socialist Federal Republic of Yugoslavia) B Orešar	6	5
LL	(Argentina) G Garetto	2	6	6
(United States) J Brown	6	2	0
(Spain) D de Miguel	6	2	4
(Czechoslovakia) T Šmíd	1	6	6
(Brazil) C Motta	3	1
5	(Argentina) E Bengoechea	6	6

Second round
1	(Ecuador) A Gómez	7	6
(Argentina) G Vilas	6	4
LL	(South Africa) D Maasdorp	4	3
(France) T Tulasne	6	6
4	(Argentina) G Pérez Roldán	6	4	6
LL	(Argentina) G Garetto	1	6	2
(Czechoslovakia) T Šmíd	6	6
5	(Argentina) E Bengoechea	3	2

Quarterfinals
1	(Ecuador) A Gómez	7	6
(France) T Tulasne	6	4
4	(Argentina) G Pérez Roldán	2	6
(Czechoslovakia) T Šmíd	6	7

Semifinals
1	(Ecuador) A Gómez	6	6	0
(Czechoslovakia) T Šmíd	7	4	6

=== Bottom half ===
First round
6	(Sweden) U Stenlund	6	6
Q	(Switzerland) Emmanuel Marmillod	2	3
(Brazil) L Mattar	6	1	6
Q	(Denmark) P Bastiansen	2	6	3
(Argentina) H de la Peña	6	6
Q	(Canada) M Wostenholme	0	2
(Sweden) H Sundström	6	3
3	(France) H Leconte	7	6
7	(France) T Benhabiles	0	5
WC	(Switzerland) R Stadler	6	7
WC	(Iran) M Bahrami	7	6
(Australia) C Limberger	6	1
LL	(Sweden) C Allgårdh	2	6	0
(Switzerland) C Mezzadri	6	4	6
Q	(Argentina) G Giussani	5	3
2	(Sweden) J Nyström	7	6

Second round
6	(Sweden) U Stenlund	6	6
(Brazil) L Mattar	3	0
(Argentina) H de la Peña	6	6	6
3	(France) H Leconte	7	4	2
WC	(Switzerland) R Stadler	6	6
WC	(Iran) M Bahrami	3	1
(Switzerland) C Mezzadri	3	6	6
2	(Sweden) J Nyström	6	2	3

Quarterfinals
6	(Sweden) U Stenlund	4	6	7
(Argentina) H de la Peña	6	1	5
WC	(Switzerland) R Stadler	4	1
(Switzerland) C Mezzadri	6	6

Semifinals
6	(Sweden) U Stenlund	2	7	6
(Switzerland) C Mezzadri	6	6	7
