= 1990 Grand Prix de Tennis de Toulouse =

- Date: 1–7 October
- Edition: 9th
- Category: World Series
- Draw: 32S / 16D
- Prize money: $260,000
- Surface: Carpet / indoor
- Location: Toulouse, France

Champions

Singles
- (Sweden) Jonas Svensson

Doubles
- (United Kingdom) Neil Broad / (South Africa) Gary Muller
- Grand Prix de Tennis de Toulouse

The 1990 Grand Prix de Tennis de Toulouse was a men's tennis tournament played on indoor carpet courts in Toulouse, France that was part of the World Series of the 1990 ATP Tour. It was the ninth edition of the tournament and was held from 1 October until 7 October 1990. Eighth-seeded Jonas Svensson won the singles title.

== Finals ==
=== Singles ===
(Sweden) Jonas Svensson defeated (France) Fabrice Santoro, 7–6, 6–2

=== Doubles ===
(United Kingdom) Neil Broad / (South Africa) Gary Muller defeated (Denmark) Michael Mortensen / (Netherlands) Michiel Schapers, 7–6, 6–4
