= Marián Vajda =

Slovak tennis player and coach

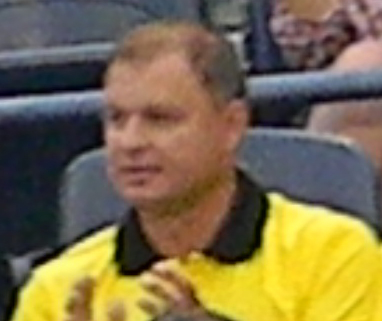
- Vajda in 2012
- Country (sports): Czechoslovakia (1984–1992); Slovakia (1993–)
- Residence: Bratislava, Slovakia
- Born: 24 March 1965 (age 60) Považská Bystrica, Czechoslovakia
- Height: 1.72 m (5 ft 8 in)
- Turned pro: 1984
- Retired: 1994
- Plays: Right-handed (two-handed backhand)
- Prize money: US$756,646

Singles
- Career record: 119–152
- Career titles: 2
- Highest ranking: No. 34 (14 September 1987)

Grand Slam singles results
- Australian Open: 2R (1991)
- French Open: 3R (1991)
- Wimbledon: 2R (1989)
- US Open: 2R (1985)

Other tournaments
- Olympic Games: 1R (1992)

Doubles
- Career record: 23–43
- Career titles: 0
- Highest ranking: No. 118 (16 April 1990)

Coaching career (1995–)
- Slovakia Davis Cup team; Slovakia Fed Cup team; Karol Kučera (2001–2005); Novak Djokovic (2006–2017, 2018–2022); Natália Vajdová; Alex Molčan (2022–2023)

Coaching achievements
- Coachee singles titles total: 85
- Coachee doubles titles total: 1
- List of notable tournaments (with champion) 2× Career Grand Slam (Djokovic); 9× Australian Open (Djokovic); 2× French Open (Djokovic); 6× Wimbledon (Djokovic); 3× US Open (Djokovic); 5× ATP World Tour Finals (Djokovic); 37× ATP World Tour Masters 1000 (Djokovic); Davis Cup (Djokovic); Olympic Bronze Medal (Djokovic)

Coaching awards and records
- Awards Best coach by the Olympic Committee of Serbia (2010, 2011); ATP Coach of the Year (2018)
Medal record
Representing Czechoslovakia
Friendship Games
| Bronze medal – third place | 1984 | Men's doubles |

Marián Vajda (Slovak pronunciation: [ˈmarijaːɱ ˈʋajda]; born 24 March 1965) is a Slovak professional tennis coach and former player. He is the former head coach of Serbian tennis player Novak Djokovic, coaching him for almost his entire professional career. Of Djokovic’s 101 men’s singles titles, 85 were won under Vajda’s tutelage. In terms of men’s singles Grand Slam titles, Vajda is the most successful coach in tennis history, coaching Djokovic to 20 such trophies out of the 24 that the Serbian has won.

== Career ==
Vajda was born in Považská Bystrica. He was a member of the Olympic Team of Czechoslovakia, and in 1992 he competed in the Olympic Games of Barcelona, being eliminated in the first round by Gilad Bloom. He reached the third round of the 1991 French Open, won two singles titles and achieved a career-high singles ranking of World No. 34 in September 1987. Vajda is a former captain of the Slovakia Davis Cup and Fed Cup teams. Vajda was the coach of Karol Kučera from 2001 to 2005. Vajda speaks fluent Serbian.

Vajda has been the coach of Novak Djokovic from 2006 until 2017, then again from 2018 to 2022. From December 2013 until 2016, Boris Becker was Djokovic's head coach with Vajda remaining part of Djokovic's team. For his achievements with the Serbian tennis player, Vajda won the award for best coach by the Olympic Committee of Serbia in both 2010 and 2011. In 2018, Vajda won the ATP Coach of the Year award.

Vajda started coaching fellow Slovak Alex Molčan in May 2022.

== Career finals ==
=== Singles (2 titles, 2 runners-up) ===
| Result | W/L | Date | Tournament | Surface | Opponent | Score |
|---|---|---|---|---|---|---|
| Loss | 0–1 | May 1987 | Munich, West Germany | Clay | (Argentina) Guillermo Pérez Roldán | 3–6, 6–7 |
| Win | 1–1 | Aug 1987 | Prague, Czechoslovakia | Clay | (Czechoslovakia) Tomáš Šmíd | 6–1, 6–3 |
| Win | 2–1 | Sep 1988 | Geneva, Switzerland | Clay | (Sweden) Kent Carlsson | 6–4, 6–4 |
| Loss | 2–2 | Jun 1989 | Bari, Italy | Clay | (Spain) Juan Aguilera | 6–4, 3–6, 4–6 |

Awards and achievements
| Preceded by (South Africa) Neville Godwin | ATP Coach of the Year; 2018 | Succeeded by (France) Gilles Cervara |
