= Mansour Bahrami =

Iranian-French tennis player (born 1956)

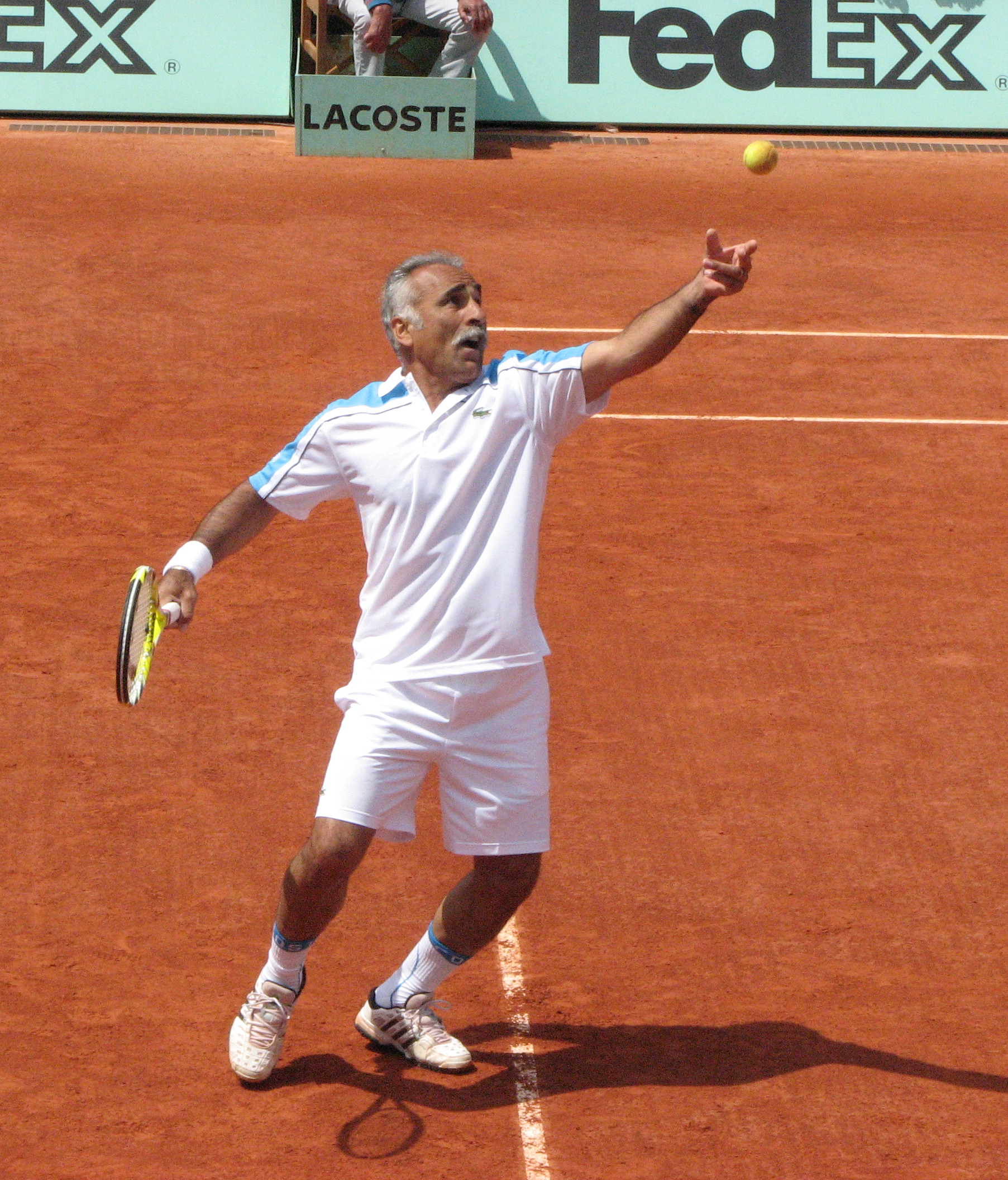
- Country (sports): Iran; France
- Residence: Paris, France
- Born: 26 April 1956 (age 70) Arak, Iran
- Height: 1.78 m (5 ft 10 in)
- Turned pro: 1974
- Retired: 1995 (singles); 2003 (doubles) (Note: Bahrami retired from the main ATP Tour in 2003. As of 2022 he continues to appear at invitational events.)
- Plays: Right-handed (one-handed backhand)
- Prize money: $368,780

Singles
- Career record: 23–47
- Career titles: 0
- Highest ranking: No. 192 (9 May 1988)

Grand Slam singles results
- Australian Open: Q1 (1977)
- French Open: 2R (1981)
- Wimbledon: Q1 (1976)

Doubles
- Career record: 108–139
- Career titles: 2
- Highest ranking: No. 31 (6 July 1987)

Grand Slam doubles results
- Australian Open: 1R (1977^{Jan})
- French Open: F (1989)
- Wimbledon: 2R (1988)
- US Open: 3R (1987)

Grand Slam mixed doubles results
- Wimbledon: 1R (1990)

Mansour Bahrami (Persian: منصور بهرامی; born 26 April 1956) is an Iranian and French former professional tennis player. A successful doubles player, he won two titles, reaching the 1989 French Open final. Hailed as "the Trick Shot King", his showmanship has made him a long-standing and popular figure in invitational tournaments.

== Early life ==
Bahrami became familiar with the tennis ball at the age of 2, since his father worked at the Amjadieh Sport Complex as a gardener. From the age 5 to 12 he worked as a ball boy in Amjadieh tennis courts. As a child in Iran, Mansour taught himself to play tennis using an old metal frying pan and other kitchen utensils since his father couldn't afford a racket for him. He didn't own his first tennis racket until the age of 12 when Shirzad Akbari, a member of the Iranian national tennis team whom Mansour was a ball boy for at the time, gave him one as a gift. At the age 15 he became the junior champion of Iran and, together with Moharram Khodaei, won the Asian junior doubles championship and later with Kambiz Derafshijavan won Asian Double championship. At the age of 16, he joined the national adult team in the Davis Cup. In his early 20s, following Iran's Islamic Revolution in the late 1970s, tennis was viewed as a capitalist and elitist sport and therefore banned. A few months after the revolution, the Islamic Government permitted some tennis activities at the national level. Subsequently, licenses for several tournaments were issued. Mansour won one of these local tournaments, receiving a prize of an airplane ticket to Athens. He paid to have the destination changed to Nice and left his girlfriend and family behind.

France offered Bahrami the opportunity to play small tournaments, but he saw that the cost of living was quite high and needed a way to maintain his finances until he could begin winning prize money. He gambled his savings in a casino in Nice and lost the lot on his first night. When his French visa ran out and without a carte de séjour (residence permit), he became a political refugee, an illegal immigrant, was constantly in fear of the police, regularly slept rough, and was forced to make food last for days. He relied on the financial support of friends until he was able to support himself.

In May 2023, he was featured on HBO’s Real Sports with Bryant Gumbel describing his early life.

== Tennis career ==
Mansour Bahrami reached the Davis Cup team at the age of 16.

Due to the forced break in his tennis play from the Islamic revolution fallout, his potential in singles was never fully realized. He became a successful doubles player, winning two tournaments and reaching the 1989 French Open doubles final with Éric Winogradsky.

=== Senior tournaments ===
Bahrami has been a mainstay of the seniors invitational tennis circuit for more than 25 years. Bahrami is considered to have "found his niche" on the ATP Champions Tour, where his flamboyant, humorous style and propensity for trick shots make him a crowd favourite in the tour's more entertainment-oriented sphere. In reference to his showmanship, his 2009 English-language autobiography was titled The Court Jester. His comic turns on the court often include faking serves; slow-motion miming; hitting balls backwards between his legs, over his shoulder, or from the back; and playing while lying down, seated, or kneeling.

== ATP career finals ==
=== Doubles: 2 titles, 10 runner-ups ===
Winner – Legend
Grand Slam (0–1)
Tennis Masters Cup (0–0)
ATP Masters Series (0–2)
ATP Tour (2–7)

Result	W–L	Date	Tournament	Surface	Partner	Opponents	Score
Loss	0–1	Jul 1986	ATP Bordeaux	Clay	(Haiti) Ronald Agénor	(Spain) Jordi Arrese (Spain) David de Miguel	5–7, 4–6
Loss	0–2	1986	MercedesCup	Clay	(Uruguay) Diego Pérez	(Chile) Hans Gildemeister (Ecuador) Andrés Gómez	4–6, 3–6
Loss	0–3	1986	Paris Masters	Carpet (i)	(Uruguay) Diego Pérez	(United States) Peter Fleming (United States) John McEnroe	3–6, 2–6
Loss	0–4	1987	Monte-Carlo Masters	Clay	(Denmark) Michael Mortensen	(Chile) Hans Gildemeister (Ecuador) Andrés Gómez	2–6, 4–6
Loss	0–5	1987	Geneva Open	Clay	(Uruguay) Diego Pérez	(Brazil) Ricardo Acioly (Brazil) Luiz Mattar	6–3, 4–6, 2–6
Win	1–5	1988	Geneva Open	Clay	(Czechoslovakia) Tomáš Šmíd	(Argentina) Gustavo Luza (Argentina) Guillermo Pérez Roldán	6–4 6–3
Loss	1–6	1988	Toulouse Grand Prix	Hard (i)	(France) Guy Forget	(Netherlands) Tom Nijssen (West Germany) Ricki Osterthun	3–6, 4–6
Loss	1–7	1989	French Open	Clay	(France) Éric Winogradsky	(United States) Jim Grabb (United States) Patrick McEnroe	4–6, 6–2, 4–6, 6–7^{(5–7)}
Loss	1–8	1989	Geneva Open	Clay	(Argentina) Guillermo Pérez Roldán	(Ecuador) Andrés Gómez (Argentina) Alberto Mancini	3–6, 5–7
Win	2–8	1989	Toulouse Grand Prix	Hard (i)	(France) Éric Winogradsky	(United States) Todd Nelson (The Bahamas) Roger Smith	6–2, 7–6
Loss	2–9	1990	ATP Bordeaux	Clay	(France) Yannick Noah	(Spain) Tomás Carbonell (Belgium) Libor Pimek	3–6, 7–6, 2-6
Loss	2–10	1991	Copenhagen Open	Carpet (i)	(Soviet Union) Andrei Olhovskiy	(Australia) Todd Woodbridge (Australia) Mark Woodforde	3–6, 1–6

== ATP Challenger Series finals ==
=== Doubles: 5 played, 3 won ===
Result	No.	Date	Tournament	Surface	Partner	Opponents	Score
Loss	1.	1986	Chartres, France	Clay	(France) Éric Winogradsky	(Argentina) Javier Frana (Argentina) Gustavo Guerrero	2–6, 4–6
Win	1.	1986	Neu-Ulm, West Germany	Clay	(Czech Republic) Jaroslav Navrátil	(Netherlands) Menno Oosting (Netherlands) Huub van Boeckel	7–5, 6–1
Win	2.	1987	Clermont-Ferrand, France	Clay	(Switzerland) Claudio Mezzadri	(France) Christophe Lesage (France) Jean-Marc Piacentile	6–3, 7–5
Loss	2.	1987	Neu-Ulm, West Germany	Clay	(Denmark) Michael Mortensen	(Germany) Jaromir Becka (Germany) Udo Riglewski	WEA
Win	3.	1990	Dijon, France	Carpet (i)	(France) Rodolphe Gilbert	(Sweden) Jan Apell (Sweden) Peter Nyborg	7–5, 6–2

== Bibliography and filmography ==
- Bahrami, Mansour (2006). Le court des miracles (in French). Paris: Le Cherche Midi. ISBN 2749107652.
- Bahrami, Mansour; Issartel, Jean (2009). The court jester : my story. Central Milton Keynes: TennisMania Trust, in association with AuthorHouse. ISBN 978-1438987941.
- The Man behind the Moustache, DVD (2009).
