= 1993 Thriftway ATP Championships =

- Date: August 9–15
- Edition: 92nd
- Category: Championship Series, Single Week
- Draw: 56S / 28D
- Prize money: $1,400,000
- Surface: Hard / outdoor
- Location: Mason, Ohio, U.S.
- Venue: Lindner Family Tennis Center

Champions

Singles
- (United States) Michael Chang

Doubles
- (United States) Andre Agassi / (Czech Republic) Petr Korda
← 1992 ·	Cincinnati Open	· 1994 →

The 1993 Cincinnati Open, known by the corporate title of the Thriftway ATP Championships was a tennis tournament played on outdoor hard courts. It was the 92nd edition of the tournament and was part of the ATP Championship Series (Single-Week) of the 1993 ATP Tour It took place in Mason, Ohio, United States, from August 9 through August 15, 1993.

The tournament had previously appeared on the Tier III of the WTA Tour but no event was held from 1989 to 2003.

The men's singles field was headlined by ATP No. 1, Miami, Sydney, Wimbledon titlist, Cincinnati defending champion Pete Sampras, Rome, Indian Wells, Memphis, Australian Open champion, Wimbledon, French Open finalist Jim Courier and Australian Open runner-up, 1989 and 1986 Cincinnati winner Stefan Edberg. Other top seeds were Queen's, Hamburg winner Michael Stich, Munich titlist Ivan Lendl, Petr Korda, Michael Chang and Richard Krajicek.

== Finals ==
=== Singles ===
(United States) Michael Chang defeated (Sweden) Stefan Edberg 7–5, 0–6, 6–4

- It was Chang's 3rd singles title of the year and the 11th of his career.

=== Doubles ===
(United States) Andre Agassi / (Czech Republic) Petr Korda defeated (Sweden) Stefan Edberg / (Sweden) Henrik Holm 7–6, 6–4
