= 1993 Lipton Championships – Women's doubles =

Women's doubles
- 1993 Lipton Championships

Final
- Champions: (Latvia) Larisa Neiland; (Czech Republic) Jana Novotná
- Runners-up: (Canada) Jill Hetherington; (United States) Kathy Rinaldi
- Score: 6–2, 7–5

Details
- Draw: 48 (2WC/2Q)
- Seeds: 16

Events
Singles	men	women
Doubles	men	women
← 1992 ·	Miami Open	· 1994 →

The 1993 Lipton Championships was a tennis tournament played on Hard courts in Key Biscayne, Florida, United States. The event was part of the 1993 ATP Tour and 1993 WTA Tour. The tournament was held from 12 to 21 March 1993.

Arantxa Sánchez Vicario and Larisa Neiland were the defending champions, but Sánchez Vicario did not compete this year

Neiland teamed up with Jana Novotná and won the title, by defeating Jill Hetherington and Kathy Rinaldi 6–2, 7–5 in the final.

== Seeds ==
All seeds received a bye into the second round.

1. (United States) Gigi Fernández / (Belarus) Natasha Zvereva (quarterfinals)
2. (Latvia) Larisa Neiland / (Czech Republic) Jana Novotná (champions)
3. (United States) Lori McNeil / (Australia) Rennae Stubbs (semifinals)
4. (United States) Pam Shriver / (Australia) Elizabeth Smylie (quarterfinals)
5. (Canada) Jill Hetherington / (United States) Kathy Rinaldi (final)
6. (United States) Mary Joe Fernández / (United States) Zina Garrison-Jackson (quarterfinals)
7. (United States) Katrina Adams / (Netherlands) Manon Bollegraf (third round)
8. (France) Isabelle Demongeot / (South Africa) Elna Reinach (quarterfinals)
9. (Italy) Sandra Cecchini / (Argentina) Patricia Tarabini (second round)
10. (South Africa) Amanda Coetzer / (United States) Linda Harvey Wild (second round)
11. (Indonesia) Yayuk Basuki / (Japan) Nana Miyagi (third round)
12. (United States) Sandy Collins / (United States) Mary Lou Daniels (second round)
13. (United States) Kimberly Po / (United States) Robin White (third round)
14. (France) Nathalie Tauziat / (Austria) Judith Wiesner (second round)
15. (United States) Debbie Graham / (Netherlands) Brenda Schultz (semifinals)
16. (Russia) Eugenia Maniokova / (Georgia (country)) Leila Meskhi (third round)

== Draw ==
=== Key ===
- Q = Qualifier
- WC = Wild card
- LL = Lucky loser
- Alt = Alternate
- SE = Special exempt
- PR = Protected ranking
- ITF = ITF entry
- JE = Junior exempt
- w/o = Walkover
- r = Retired
- d = Defaulted
- SR = Special ranking

=== Finals ===
Quarterfinals

Semifinals

Final

1
- (United States) Gigi Fernández
- (Belarus) Natasha Zvereva
6
3
3

15
(United States) Debbie Graham
(Netherlands) Brenda Schultz
3
6
6

15
- (United States) Debbie Graham
- (Netherlands) Brenda Schultz
2
7
2

5
(Canada) Jill Hetherington
(United States) Kathy Rinaldi
6
5
6

4
- (United States) Pam Shriver
- (Australia) Elizabeth Smylie
6
5
1

5
(Canada) Jill Hetherington
(United States) Kathy Rinaldi
1
7
6

5
- (Canada) Jill Hetherington
- (United States) Kathy Rinaldi
2
5

2
(Latvia) Larisa Neiland
(Czech Republic) Jana Novotná
6
7

6
- (United States) Mary Joe Fernández
- (United States) Zina Garrison-Jackson
6
6^{3}
4

3
(United States) Lori McNeil
(Australia) Rennae Stubbs
3
7^{7}
6

3
- (United States) Lori McNeil
- (Australia) Rennae Stubbs
7^{7}
1
4

2
(Latvia) Larisa Neiland
(Czech Republic) Jana Novotná
6^{3}
6
6

8
- (France) Isabelle Demongeot
- (South Africa) Elna Reinach
4
4

2
(Latvia) Larisa Neiland
(Czech Republic) Jana Novotná
6
6

=== Top half ===
==== Section 1 ====
First round

Second round

Third round

Quarterfinals

1
(United States) G Fernández
(Belarus) N Zvereva
6
6

- (United States) A Grossman
- (Canada) P Hy
6
3
5

- (United States) J Fuchs
- (Sweden) M Strandlund
2
3

(United States) J Fuchs
(Sweden) M Strandlund
3
6
7

1
(United States) G Fernández
(Belarus) N Zvereva
6
6

(United States) P Fendick
(United States) M McGrath
6
6

11
- (Indonesia) Y Basuki
- (Japan) N Miyagi
2
2

- (United States) B Bowes
- (United States) T Whittington
1
0

- (United States) P Fendick
- (United States) M McGrath
1
5

11
(Indonesia) Y Basuki
(Japan) N Miyagi
6
7

1
- (United States) G Fernández
- (Belarus) N Zvereva
6
3
3

15
(United States) D Graham
(Netherlands) B Schultz
3
6
6

15
(United States) D Graham
(Netherlands) B Schultz
4
6
7^{7}

- (Sweden) M Lindström
- (Australia) L Pleming
3
6
4

- (United States) E Burgin
- (Netherlands) C Vis
6
1
6^{2}

(United States) E Burgin
(Netherlands) C Vis
6
2
6

15
(United States) D Graham
(Netherlands) B Schultz
6
7

(Netherlands) I Driehuis
(Mexico) L Novelo
6
2
6

7
- (United States) K Adams
- (Netherlands) M Bollegraf
3
5

WC
- (United States) R Jensen
- (Netherlands) S Rottier
2
6
0

- (Netherlands) I Driehuis
- (Mexico) L Novelo
7
6^{3}
3

7
(United States) K Adams
(Netherlands) M Bollegraf
5
7^{7}
6

==== Section 2 ====
First round

Second round

Third round

Quarterfinals

4
(United States) P Shriver
(Australia) E Smylie
6
6

- (Australia) T Morton
- (United Kingdom) C Wood
5
1

- (United States) C MacGregor
- (United States) S Stafford
3
3

(United States) C MacGregor
(United States) S Stafford
7
6

4
(United States) P Shriver
(Australia) E Smylie
6
6

(United States) S McCarthy
(United States) M Werdel
6
5
6

- (United States) S McCarthy
- (United States) M Werdel
3
2

- (Peru) L Gildemeister
- (Hungary) A Temesvári
2
7
4

(United States) S McCarthy
(United States) M Werdel
3
6
6

9
- (Italy) S Cecchini
- (Argentina) P Tarabini
6
2
3

4
- (United States) P Shriver
- (Australia) E Smylie
6
5
1

5
(Canada) J Hetherington
(United States) K Rinaldi
1
7
6

14
- (France) N Tauziat
- (Austria) J Wiesner
5
1

- (United States) N Arendt
- (United States) J Emmons
3
6^{8}

(Germany) K Kschwendt
(Germany) W Probst
7
6

(Germany) K Kschwendt
(Germany) W Probst
6
7^{10}

- (Germany) K Kschwendt
- (Germany) W Probst
2
0

- (South Africa) L Gregory
- (Germany) E Pfaff
7^{7}
4
2

5
(Canada) J Hetherington
(United States) K Rinaldi
6
6

(Argentina) F Labat
(United States) P O'Reilly
6^{4}
6
6

- (Argentina) F Labat
- (United States) P O'Reilly
3
6
4

5
(Canada) J Hetherington
(United States) K Rinaldi
6
3
6

=== Bottom half ===
==== Section 3 ====
First round

Second round

Third round

Quarterfinals

6
(United States) MJ Fernández
(United States) Z Garrison-Jackson
6
6

(South Africa) R Fairbank-Nideffer
(United States) B Nagelsen
6
6

- (South Africa) R Fairbank-Nideffer
- (United States) B Nagelsen
3
1

Q
- (Czech Republic) K Kroupová
- (Greece) C Papadáki
3
4

6
(United States) MJ Fernández
(United States) Z Garrison-Jackson
3
7^{7}
6

(Germany) C Singer
(South Africa) D Van Rensburg
6
6

13
- (United States) K Po
- (United States) R White
6
6^{5}
1

- (Argentina) MJ Gaidano
- (Argentina) M Paz
2
1

- (Germany) C Singer
- (South Africa) D Van Rensburg
2
1

13
(United States) K Po
(United States) R White
6
6

6
- (United States) MJ Fernández
- (United States) Z Garrison-Jackson
6
6^{3}
4

3
(United States) L McNeil
(Australia) R Stubbs
3
7^{7}
6

12
- (United States) S Collins
- (United States) ML Daniels
3
3

- (Australia) M Jaggard-Lai
- (Australia) R McQuillan
6^{1}
4

(France) J Halard
(Slovakia) R Zrubáková
6
6

(France) J Halard
(Slovakia) R Zrubáková
7^{7}
6

- (France) J Halard
- (Slovakia) R Zrubáková
4
3

WC
(United States) N London
(United States) J Steven
6
6

3
(United States) L McNeil
(Australia) R Stubbs
6
6

Q
- (Finland) N Dahlman
- (United States) L Glitz
4
4

WC
- (United States) N London
- (United States) J Steven
3
2

3
(United States) L McNeil
(Australia) R Stubbs
6
6

==== Section 4 ====
First round

Second round

Third round

Quarterfinals

8
(France) I Demongeot
(South Africa) E Reinach
6
6

(Netherlands) M Oremans
(Austria) P Ritter
6
6

- (Netherlands) M Oremans
- (Austria) P Ritter
3
1

- (United States) C Benjamin
- (United States) C Kuhlman
1
3

8
(France) I Demongeot
(South Africa) E Reinach
4
6
7^{7}

(United Kingdom) J Durie
(United States) G Helgeson
6
7^{7}

- (United Kingdom) J Durie
- (United States) G Helgeson
6
1
6^{4}

- (United States) L Davenport
- (United States) C Rubin
2
6^{5}

(United Kingdom) J Durie
(United States) G Helgeson
6
6

10
- (South Africa) A Coetzer
- (United States) L Harvey Wild
4
2

8
- (France) I Demongeot
- (South Africa) E Reinach
4
4

2
(Latvia) L Neiland
(Czech Republic) J Novotná
6
6

16
(Russia) E Maniokova
(Georgia (country)) L Meskhi
6
6

- (Australia) J Byrne
- (Australia) L Field
3
2

- (Italy) S Farina
- (Italy) L Golarsa
1
3

(Italy) S Farina
(Italy) L Golarsa
6
6

16
- (Russia) E Maniokova
- (Georgia (country)) L Meskhi
5
6
1

(Argentina) I Gorrochategui
(France) S Testud
5
6
6

2
(Latvia) L Neiland
(Czech Republic) J Novotná
7
3
6

- (United States) L Allen
- (France) N Herreman
7
4
3

- (Argentina) I Gorrochategui
- (France) S Testud
3
4

2
(Latvia) L Neiland
(Czech Republic) J Novotná
6
6
