= 1993 Indonesian Open =

- Date: 11–17 January
- Edition: 1st
- Category: World Series
- Draw: 32S / 16D
- Prize money: $275,000
- Surface: Hard / outdoor
- Location: Jakarta, Indonesia
- Venue: Gelora Senayan Stadium

Champions

Singles
- (United States) Michael Chang

Doubles
- (Italy) Diego Nargiso / (France) Guillaume Raoux
- Jakarta Open

The 1993 Indonesian Open was a men's tennis tournament played on outdoor hard courts at the Gelora Senayan Stadium in Jakarta, Indonesia as part of the World Series of the 1993 ATP Tour. It was the inaugural edition of the tournament since its reboot in 1993 and was held from 11 January through 17 January 1993. First-seeded Michael Chang won the singles title.

== Finals ==
=== Singles ===
(United States) Michael Chang defeated (Germany) Carl-Uwe Steeb 2–6, 6–2, 6–1

- It was Chang's first singles title of the year and the 5th of his career.

=== Doubles ===
(Italy) Diego Nargiso / (France) Guillaume Raoux defeated (Netherlands) Jacco Eltingh / (Netherlands) Paul Haarhuis 7–6, 6–7, 6–3

- It was Nargiso's only doubles title of the year and the 3rd of his career.
- It was Raoux' only doubles title of the year and the first of his career.
