= 1993 Lipton Championships =

- Date: March 12 – 21
- Edition: 9th
- Surface: Hard / outdoor
- Location: Key Biscayne, Florida, U.S.
- Venue: Tennis Center at Crandon Park

Champions

Men's singles
- (United States) Pete Sampras

Women's singles
- (Spain) Arantxa Sánchez Vicario

Men's doubles
- (Netherlands) Richard Krajicek / (Netherlands) Jan Siemerink

Women's doubles
- (Czech Republic) Jana Novotná / (Latvia) Larisa Savchenko
← 1992 ·	Miami Open	· 1994 →

The 1993 Lipton Championships was a tennis tournament played on Hard courts in Key Biscayne, Florida, United States the event was part of the 1993 ATP Tour and 1993 WTA Tour. The tournament was held from March 12 to 21, 1993.

== Finals ==
=== Men's singles ===
(United States) Pete Sampras defeated (United States) MaliVai Washington, 6–3, 6–2.

- It was Pete Sampras' 2nd title of the year and his 15th overall. It was his 1st Masters title of the year and his 2nd overall.

=== Women's singles ===
(Spain) Arantxa Sánchez Vicario defeated (Germany) Steffi Graf, 6–4, 3–6, 6–3.

- It was Arantxa Sanchez Vicario's 1st title of the year and her 9th overall. It was her 1st Tier I title of the year and her 3rd overall. It was also her second consecutive win at the event after winning in 1992.

=== Men's doubles ===
(Netherlands) Richard Krajicek / (Netherlands) Jan Siemerink defeated (United States) Patrick McEnroe / (United States) Jonathan Stark, 6–7, 6–4, 7–6.

=== Women's doubles ===
(Czech Republic) Jana Novotná / (Latvia) Larisa Savchenko defeated (Canada) Jill Hetherington / (United States) Kathy Rinaldi, 6–2, 7–5.
