= 1992 Lipton International Players Championships – Women's doubles =

Women's doubles
- 1992 Lipton International Players Championships

Final
- Champions: (Spain) Arantxa Sánchez Vicario (Latvia) Larisa Savchenko Neiland
- Runners-up: (Canada) Jill Hetherington (United States) Kathy Rinaldi
- Score: 7–5, 5–7, 6–3

Details
- Draw: 48 (2WC)
- Seeds: 16

Events
Singles	men	women
Doubles	men	women
← 1991 ·	Miami Open	· 1993 →

Mary Joe Fernández and Zina Garrison were the defending champions, but lost in third round to Yayuk Basuki and Nana Miyagi.

Arantxa Sánchez Vicario and Larisa Savchenko Neiland won the title by defeating Jill Hetherington and Kathy Rinaldi 7–5, 5–7, 6–3 in the final.

== Seeds ==
All seeded players received a bye into the second round.

1. (Spain) Arantxa Sánchez Vicario / (Latvia) Larisa Savchenko Neiland (champions)
2. (United States) Mary Joe Fernández / (United States) Zina Garrison (third round)
3. (United States) Patty Fendick / (United States) Gigi Fernández (second round)
4. (United States) Robin White / (Commonwealth of Independent States) Natasha Zvereva (quarterfinals)
5. (Canada) Jill Hetherington / (United States) Kathy Rinaldi (final)
6. (United States) Sandy Collins / (South Africa) Elna Reinach (third round)
7. (United States) Katrina Adams / (Netherlands) Manon Bollegraf (semifinals)
8. (Commonwealth of Independent States) Leila Meskhi / (Argentina) Mercedes Paz (second round)
9. (France) Isabelle Demongeot / (Japan) Maya Kidowaki (second round)
10. (South Africa) Lise Gregory / (United States) Gretchen Magers (third round)
11. (United States) Stephanie Rehe / (Netherlands) Brenda Schultz (semifinals)
12. (France) Nathalie Tauziat / (Austria) Judith Wiesner (second round)
13. (United States) Cammy MacGregor / (United States) Peanut Louie Harper (third round)
14. (United States) Mary-Lou Daniels / (South Africa) Rosalyn Fairbank-Nideffer (third round)
15. (United Kingdom) Jo Durie / (Czechoslovakia) Andrea Strnadová (second round)
16. (Italy) Sandra Cecchini / (Argentina) Patricia Tarabini (second round)

== Draw ==
=== Key ===
- Q = Qualifier
- WC = Wild card
- LL = Lucky loser
- Alt = Alternate
- SE = Special exempt
- PR = Protected ranking
- ITF = ITF entry
- JE = Junior exempt
- w/o = Walkover
- r = Retired
- d = Defaulted
- SR = Special ranking

=== Finals ===
Quarterfinals
1	(Spain) Arantxa Sánchez Vicario (Latvia) Larisa Savchenko Neiland	6	7
(Sweden) Catarina Lindqvist (United States) Lori McNeil	4	5
(United States) Debbie Graham (United States) Ginger Helgeson	4	0
11	(United States) Stephanie Rehe (Netherlands) Brenda Schultz	6	6
7	(United States) Katrina Adams (Netherlands) Manon Bollegraf	6	6
4	(United States) Robin White (Commonwealth of Independent States) Natasha Zvereva	1	2
5	(Canada) Jill Hetherington (United States) Kathy Rinaldi	6	6
(Indonesia) Yayuk Basuki (Japan) Nana Miyagi	1	3

Semifinals
1	(Spain) Arantxa Sánchez Vicario (Latvia) Larisa Savchenko Neiland	6	6
11	(United States) Stephanie Rehe (Netherlands) Brenda Schultz	1	1
7	(United States) Katrina Adams (Netherlands) Manon Bollegraf	4	6	2
5	(Canada) Jill Hetherington (United States) Kathy Rinaldi	6	4	6

Final
1	(Spain) Arantxa Sánchez Vicario (Latvia) Larisa Savchenko Neiland	7	5	6
5	(Canada) Jill Hetherington (United States) Kathy Rinaldi	5	7	3

=== Top half ===
==== Section 1 ====
First round
(Argentina) F Labat (Italy) R Reggi-Concato	3	7^{7}	4
(United States) C Benjamin (United States) J Santrock	6	6^{2}	6
(Commonwealth of Independent States) E Brioukhovets (Commonwealth of Independent States) N Medvedeva	7^{7}	6
(Australia) T Morton (United Kingdom) C Wood	6^{5}	4
(United States) S Stafford (United States) M Werdel	4	6	6
(Japan) K Date (France) N Herreman	6	2	0
(United States) N Arendt (United States) P Mager	7	3	4
(Sweden) C Lindqvist (United States) L McNeil	5	6	6

Second round
1	(Spain) A Sánchez Vicario (Latvia) L Savchenko Neiland	6	6
(United States) C Benjamin (United States) J Santrock	0	3
(Commonwealth of Independent States) E Brioukhovets (Commonwealth of Independent States) N Medvedeva	7^{7}	6
16	(Italy) S Cecchini (Argentina) P Tarabini	6^{4}	2
9	(France) I Demongeot (Japan) M Kidowaki	6	5	1
(United States) S Stafford (United States) M Werdel	4	7	6
(Sweden) C Lindqvist (United States) L McNeil	7	6
8	(Commonwealth of Independent States) L Meskhi (Argentina) M Paz	5	2

Third round
1	(Spain) A Sánchez Vicario (Latvia) L Savchenko Neiland	6	6
(Commonwealth of Independent States) E Brioukhovets (Commonwealth of Independent States) N Medvedeva	4	2
(United States) S Stafford (United States) M Werdel	3	0
(Sweden) C Lindqvist (United States) L McNeil	6	6

Quarterfinals
1	(Spain) A Sánchez Vicario (Latvia) L Savchenko Neiland	6	7
(Sweden) C Lindqvist (United States) L McNeil	4	5

==== Section 2 ====
First round
(Italy) L Ferrando (Germany) W Probst	4	3
(United States) D Graham (United States) G Helgeson	6	6
(France) P Paradis-Mangon (Germany) C Porwik	6	6
(Argentina) B Fulco-Villella (Australia) K Godridge	3	1
(Poland) R Baranski (United States) L Glitz	6	6
(United Kingdom) A Grunfeld (Netherlands) H ter Riet	0	3
(United States) C Cunningham (Peru) L Gildemeister	2	3
WC	(United States) B Nagelsen (Argentina) G Sabatini	6	6

Second round
3	(United States) P Fendick (United States) G Fernández	5	6^{6}
(United States) D Graham (United States) G Helgeson	7	7^{8}
(France) P Paradis-Mangon (Germany) C Porwik	6^{6}	4
13	(United States) C MacGregor (United States) PL Harper	7^{8}	6
11	(United States) S Rehe (Netherlands) B Schultz	6	5	7
(Poland) R Baranski (United States) L Glitz	0	7	5
WC	(United States) B Nagelsen (Argentina) G Sabatini	5	2
6	(United States) S Collins (South Africa) E Reinach	7	6

Third round
(United States) D Graham (United States) G Helgeson	6	4	6
13	(United States) C MacGregor (United States) PL Harper	1	6	1
11	(United States) S Rehe (Netherlands) B Schultz	6	6
6	(United States) S Collins (South Africa) E Reinach	1	3

Quarterfinals
(United States) D Graham (United States) G Helgeson	4	0
11	(United States) S Rehe (Netherlands) B Schultz	6	6

=== Bottom half ===
==== Section 3 ====
First round
(United States) L Harvey Wild (United States) T Whitlinger	2	7	6
(Netherlands) M Kiene (Netherlands) M Oremans	6	6	3
(United States) A Frazier (Japan) R Hiraki	5	6	6
WC	(United States) K Po (United States) S Sampras	7	1	1
(Italy) N Baudone (Italy) S Farina	3	6	7
(France) A Dechaume (France) J Halard	6	0	5
(United States) E Burgin (Canada) H Kelesi	3	2
(United States) M McGrath (Australia) R Stubbs	6	6

Second round
7	(United States) K Adams (Netherlands) M Bollegraf	6	7^{7}
(United States) L Harvey Wild (United States) T Whitlinger	4	6^{5}
(United States) A Frazier (Japan) R Hiraki	6	6
12	(France) N Tauziat (Austria) J Wiesner	1	3
14	(United States) ML Daniels (South Africa) R Fairbank-Nideffer	6	6
(Italy) N Baudone (Italy) S Farina	4	2
(United States) M McGrath (Australia) R Stubbs	5	3
4	(United States) R White (Commonwealth of Independent States) N Zvereva	7	6

Third round
7	(United States) K Adams (Netherlands) M Bollegraf	6	7
(United States) A Frazier (Japan) R Hiraki	3	5
14	(United States) ML Daniels (South Africa) R Fairbank-Nideffer	4	2
4	(United States) R White (Commonwealth of Independent States) N Zvereva	6	6

Quarterfinals
7	(United States) K Adams (Netherlands) M Bollegraf	6	6
4	(United States) R White (Commonwealth of Independent States) N Zvereva	1	2

==== Section 4 ====
First round
(United States) Christine O'Reilly (United States) P O'Reilly	7	6^{6}	6
(United States) B Bowes (United States) W Prausa	5	7^{8}	4
(Germany) M Babel (Germany) B Rittner	6	7^{7}
(Czechoslovakia) P Langrová (Czechoslovakia) R Zrubáková	2	6^{2}
(Germany) E Pfaff (France) C Suire	1	6	6^{4}
(Indonesia) Y Basuki (Japan) N Miyagi	6	4	7^{7}
(United Kingdom) B Borneo (Sweden) M Lindström	3	6	3
(United States) A Gooden (Czechoslovakia) K Habšudová	6	4	6

Second round
5	(Canada) J Hetherington (United States) K Rinaldi	6	6
(United States) Christine O'Reilly (United States) P O'Reilly	1	0
(Germany) M Babel (Germany) B Rittner	2	3
10	(South Africa) L Gregory (United States) G Magers	6	6
16	(United Kingdom) J Durie (Czechoslovakia) A Strnadová	1	2
(Indonesia) Y Basuki (Japan) N Miyagi	6	6
(United States) A Gooden (Czechoslovakia) K Habšudová	4	2
2	(United States) MJ Fernández (United States) Z Garrison	6	6

Third round
5	(Canada) J Hetherington (United States) K Rinaldi	6	6
10	(South Africa) L Gregory (United States) G Magers	1	2
(Indonesia) Y Basuki (Japan) N Miyagi	6	3	6
2	(United States) MJ Fernández (United States) Z Garrison	2	6	4

Quarterfinals
5	(Canada) J Hetherington (United States) K Rinaldi	6	6
(Indonesia) Y Basuki (Japan) N Miyagi	1	3
