= 1993 Trofeo Kim Top Line =

Tennis tournament in Florence, Italy

- Date: 7–13 June
- Edition: 21st
- Category: World Series
- Draw: 32S / 16D
- Prize money: $275,000
- Surface: Clay / outdoor
- Location: Florence, Italy

Champions

Singles
- (Austria) Thomas Muster

Doubles
- (Spain) Tomás Carbonell / (Belgium) Libor Pimek
- ATP Florence

The 1993 Trofeo Kim Top Line, also known as the ATP Florence, was a men's tennis tournament played on outdoor clay courts in Florence, Italy that was part of the World Series tier of the 1993 ATP Tour circuit. It was the 21st edition of the tournament and was played from 7 June until 13 June 1993. First-seeded Thomas Muster, who entered the main draw on a wildcard, won his third consecutive singles title at the event.

== Finals ==
=== Singles ===
(Austria) Thomas Muster defeated (Spain) Jordi Burillo 6–1, 7–5

- It was Muster's 2nd singles title of the year and the 15th of his career.

=== Doubles ===
(Spain) Tomás Carbonell / (Belgium) Libor Pimek defeated (Netherlands) Mark Koevermans / (South Africa) Brent Haygarth 7–6, 2–6, 6–1

- It was Carbonell's 2nd doubles title of the year and the 10th of his career. It was Pimek's 1st doubles title of the year and the 9th of his career.
