= 1992 Lipton International Players Championships – Women's singles =

Women's singles
- 1992 Lipton International Players Championships

Final
- Champion: (Spain) Arantxa Sánchez Vicario
- Runner-up: (Argentina) Gabriela Sabatini
- Score: 6–1, 6–4

Details
- Draw: 96 (8WC/8Q)
- Seeds: 32

Events
Singles	men	women
Doubles	men	women
← 1991 ·	Miami Open	· 1993 →

Arantxa Sánchez Vicario defeated Gabriela Sabatini in the final, 6–1, 6–4 to win the women's singles tennis title at the 1992 Miami Open.

Monica Seles was the two-time defending champion, but lost in the quarterfinals to Jennifer Capriati.

== Seeds ==
All seeded players received a bye into the second round.

1. (Socialist Federal Republic of Yugoslavia) Monica Seles (quarterfinals)
2. (Germany) Steffi Graf (semifinals)
3. (Argentina) Gabriela Sabatini (final)
4. (Spain) Arantxa Sánchez Vicario (champion)
5. (United States) Jennifer Capriati (semifinals)
6. (United States) Mary Joe Fernández (quarterfinals)
7. (Commonwealth of Independent States) Leila Meskhi (third round)
8. (France) Nathalie Tauziat (fourth round)
9. (United States) Zina Garrison (fourth round)
10. (France) Mary Pierce (third round)
11. (Austria) Judith Wiesner (third round)
12. (United States) Gigi Fernández (fourth round)
13. (United States) Lori McNeil (third round)
14. (United States) Amy Frazier (quarterfinals)
15. (Peru) Laura Gildemeister (second round)
16. (Japan) Kimiko Date (fourth round)
17. (Czechoslovakia) Radomira Zrubáková (fourth round)
18. (Commonwealth of Independent States) Natasha Zvereva (third round)
19. (Italy) Sandra Cecchini (second round)
20. (Germany) Barbara Rittner (fourth round)
21. (Japan) Naoko Sawamatsu (third round)
22. (Netherlands) Brenda Schultz (fourth round)
23. (United States) Pam Shriver (third round)
24. (Indonesia) Yayuk Basuki (second round)
25. (United States) Debbie Graham (second round)
26. (United States) Marianne Werdel (second round)
27. (Commonwealth of Independent States) Natalia Medvedeva (third round)
28. (Czechoslovakia) Karina Habšudová (third round)
29. (Czechoslovakia) Andrea Strnadová (third round)
30. (United States) Tami Whitlinger (second round)
31. (United States) Robin White (second round)
32. (Sweden) Catarina Lindqvist (second round)

== Draw ==
=== Key ===
- Q = Qualifier
- WC = Wild card
- LL = Lucky loser
- Alt = Alternate
- SE = Special exempt
- PR = Protected ranking
- ITF = ITF entry
- JE = Junior exempt
- w/o = Walkover
- r = Retired
- d = Defaulted
- SR = Special ranking

=== Finals ===
Quarterfinals
1	(Socialist Federal Republic of Yugoslavia) Monica Seles	2	6^{5}
5	(United States) Jennifer Capriati	6	7^{7}
4	(Spain) Arantxa Sánchez Vicario	6	6
(South Africa) Amanda Coetzer	1	4
14	(United States) Amy Frazier	0	1
3	(Argentina) Gabriela Sabatini	6	6
6	(United States) Mary Joe Fernández	6^{5}	4
2	(Germany) Steffi Graf	7^{7}	6

Semifinals
5	(United States) Jennifer Capriati	2	4
4	(Spain) Arantxa Sánchez Vicario	6	6
3	(Argentina) Gabriela Sabatini	3	7^{7}	6
2	(Germany) Steffi Graf	6	6^{5}	1

Final
4	(Spain) Arantxa Sánchez Vicario	6	6
3	(Argentina) Gabriela Sabatini	1	4

=== Top half ===
==== Section 1 ====
First round
Q	(United States) C Benjamin	6	7
(Germany) M Babel	4	5
(Latvia) L Savchenko-Neiland	6	6
(Japan) M Kidowaki	1	0
(Canada) H Kelesi	3	6	4
WC	(Netherlands) M Oremans	6	2	6
WC	(United States) ML Daniels	5	0
(United States) D Faber	7	6

Second round
1	(Socialist Federal Republic of Yugoslavia) M Seles	6	6
Q	(United States) C Benjamin	1	3
(Latvia) L Savchenko-Neiland	6	6
30	(United States) T Whitlinger	2	3
17	(Czechoslovakia) R Zrubáková	6	6
WC	(Netherlands) M Oremans	1	1
(United States) D Faber	4	3
11	(Austria) J Wiesner	6	6

Third round
1	(Socialist Federal Republic of Yugoslavia) M Seles	6	6
(Latvia) L Savchenko-Neiland	0	4
17	(Czechoslovakia) R Zrubáková	7^{8}	6
11	(Austria) J Wiesner	6^{6}	4

Fourth round
1	(Socialist Federal Republic of Yugoslavia) M Seles	6	6
17	(Czechoslovakia) R Zrubáková	1	2

==== Section 2 ====
First round
(Italy) L Ferrando	5	0
(France) P Paradis-Mangon	7	6
(United Kingdom) S Gomer	5	4
WC	(United States) S Rehe	7	6
(Italy) K Piccolini	6	3	3
WC	(United States) K Rinaldi	3	6	6
Q	(United States) N Hummel	4	4
(Australia) K Godridge	6	6

Second round
9	(United States) Z Garrison	6	6
(France) P Paradis-Mangon	3	4
WC	(United States) S Rehe	2	7^{10}	1
21	(Japan) N Sawamatsu	6	6^{8}	6
28	(Czechoslovakia) K Habšudová	3	6	6
WC	(United States) K Rinaldi	6	1	2
(Australia) K Godridge	3	5
5	(United States) J Capriati	6	7

Third round
9	(United States) Z Garrison	6	6
21	(Japan) N Sawamatsu	4	0
28	(Czechoslovakia) K Habšudová	3	1
5	(United States) J Capriati	6	6

Fourth round
9	(United States) Z Garrison	7	4	3
5	(United States) J Capriati	5	6	6

==== Section 3 ====
First round
WC	(United States) L Davenport	2	6	6
Q	(Canada) M Drake	6	3	2
(United Kingdom) J Durie	6^{8}	0
(United States) G Helgeson	7^{10}	6
(Argentina) B Fulco-Villella	6	6
(United States) C Rubin	1	2
Q	(United States) C Kuhlman	6	6
(United States) E deLone	1	2

Second round
4	(Spain) A Sánchez Vicario	6	6
WC	(United States) L Davenport	4	4
(United States) G Helgeson	7	6
24	(Indonesia) Y Basuki	5	4
20	(Germany) B Rittner	6	6
(Argentina) B Fulco-Villella	1	3
Q	(United States) C Kuhlman	4	6	2
13	(United States) L McNeil	6	4	6

Third round
4	(Spain) A Sánchez Vicario	6	6
(United States) G Helgeson	2	2
20	(Germany) B Rittner	7^{7}	4	6
13	(United States) L McNeil	6^{5}	6	3

Fourth round
4	(Spain) A Sánchez Vicario	6	2
20	(Germany) B Rittner	1	1^{r}

==== Section 4 ====
First round
(Italy) S Farina	4	6	6
WC	(United States) G Rush	6	2	3
(United States) H Cioffi	2	3
(Argentina) F Labat	6	6
(South Africa) A Coetzer	6	6
Q	(Canada) C Bassett-Seguso	4	4
(Czechoslovakia) E Švíglerová	1	0
(Czechoslovakia) P Langrová	6	6

Second round
15	(Peru) L Gildemeister	3	7^{7}	4
(Italy) S Farina	6	6^{5}	6
(Argentina) F Labat	6	6
32	(Sweden) C Lindqvist	2	0
25	(United States) D Graham	2	4
(South Africa) A Coetzer	6	6
(Czechoslovakia) P Langrová	7^{7}	1	2
7	(Commonwealth of Independent States) L Meskhi	6^{5}	6	6

Third round
(Italy) S Farina	5	1
(Argentina) F Labat	7	6
(South Africa) A Coetzer	6	4
7	(Commonwealth of Independent States) L Meskhi	3	1^{r}

Fourth round
(Argentina) F Labat	2	6	2
(South Africa) A Coetzer	6	3	6

=== Bottom half ===
==== Section 5 ====
First round
(Finland) P Thorén	2	6	6
(Commonwealth of Independent States) E Maniokova	6	0	1
(Argentina) P Tarabini	6	6
(Netherlands) M Bollegraf	3	3
(France) N van Lottum	6	7
(Japan) R Hiraki	0	5
(Germany) M Kochta	4	2
(Germany) S Hack	6	6

Second round
8	(France) N Tauziat	7	7
(Finland) P Thorén	5	5
(Argentina) P Tarabini	2	0
27	(Commonwealth of Independent States) N Medvedeva	6	6
23	(United States) P Shriver	6	6
(France) N van Lottum	3	2
(Germany) S Hack	2	5
14	(United States) A Frazier	6	7

Third round
8	(France) N Tauziat	6	6
27	(Commonwealth of Independent States) N Medvedeva	4	2
23	(United States) P Shriver	2	0
14	(United States) A Frazier	6	6

Fourth round
8	(France) N Tauziat	4	6^{3}
14	(United States) A Frazier	6	7^{7}

==== Section 6 ====
First round
(South Africa) E Reinach	3	6	3
(France) K Quentrec	6	4	1^{r}
(France) A Dechaume	3	6^{2}
(United States) A Keller	6	7^{7}
(South Africa) R Fairbank-Nideffer	6^{4}	7^{7}	6
(France) I Demongeot	7^{7}	6^{2}	3
(Argentina) M Paz	3	3
(United States) K Adams	6	6

Second round
10	(France) M Pierce	0	6	6
(South Africa) E Reinach	6	3	3
(United States) A Keller	2	6^{5}
22	(Netherlands) B Schultz	6	7^{7}
31	(United States) R White	4	1
(South Africa) R Fairbank-Nideffer	6	6
(United States) K Adams	2	3
3	(Argentina) G Sabatini	6	6

Third round
10	(France) M Pierce	6^{5}	6	0^{r}
22	(Netherlands) B Schultz	7^{7}	1	4
(South Africa) R Fairbank-Nideffer	2	0
3	(Argentina) G Sabatini	6	6

Fourth round
22	(Netherlands) B Schultz	1	7^{7}	0
3	(Argentina) G Sabatini	6	6^{1}	6

==== Section 7 ====
First round
Q	(France) N Herreman	6	6
(Japan) A Kijimuta	2	4
WC	(United States) S Stafford	6	6
WC	(United States) M McGrath	1	3
(Australia) R Stubbs	7	7
Q	(Japan) K Nagatsuka	5	5
(France) C Suire	6^{4}	6	2
(United States) K Po	7^{7}	3	6

Second round
6	(United States) MJ Fernández	7	6
Q	(France) N Herreman	5	2
WC	(United States) S Stafford	6	5	1
18	(Commonwealth of Independent States) N Zvereva	3	7	6
29	(Czechoslovakia) A Strnadová	6	7^{7}
(Australia) R Stubbs	4	6^{2}
(United States) K Po	4	6	3
12	(United States) G Fernández	6	3	6

Third round
6	(United States) MJ Fernández	6	6
18	(Commonwealth of Independent States) N Zvereva	4	4
29	(Czechoslovakia) A Strnadová	4	6	5
12	(United States) G Fernández	6	3	7

Fourth round
6	(United States) MJ Fernández	6	7
12	(United States) G Fernández	2	5

==== Section 8 ====
First round
(United States) L Harvey Wild	6	6
(Germany) C Porwik	3	3
(United States) C Cunningham	6	6
(Czechoslovakia) R Rajchrtová	0	0
(Italy) R Reggi-Concato	4	6	6
(United States) P Harper	6	4	2
Q	(Germany) W Probst	6	6
(Commonwealth of Independent States) E Brioukhovets	2	2

Second round
16	(Japan) K Date	6	3	6
(United States) L Harvey Wild	2	6	3
(United States) C Cunningham	7	6
26	(United States) M Werdel	5	2
19	(Italy) S Cecchini	0	4
(Italy) R Reggi-Concato	6	6
Q	(Germany) W Probst	3	1
2	(Germany) S Graf	6	6

Third round
16	(Japan) K Date	3	6	6
(United States) C Cunningham	6	1	1
(Italy) R Reggi-Concato	2	2
2	(Germany) S Graf	6	6

Fourth round
16	(Japan) K Date	6^{4}	7	4
2	(Germany) S Graf	7^{7}	5	6
