= 1993 ATP Tour =

Men's tennis circuit

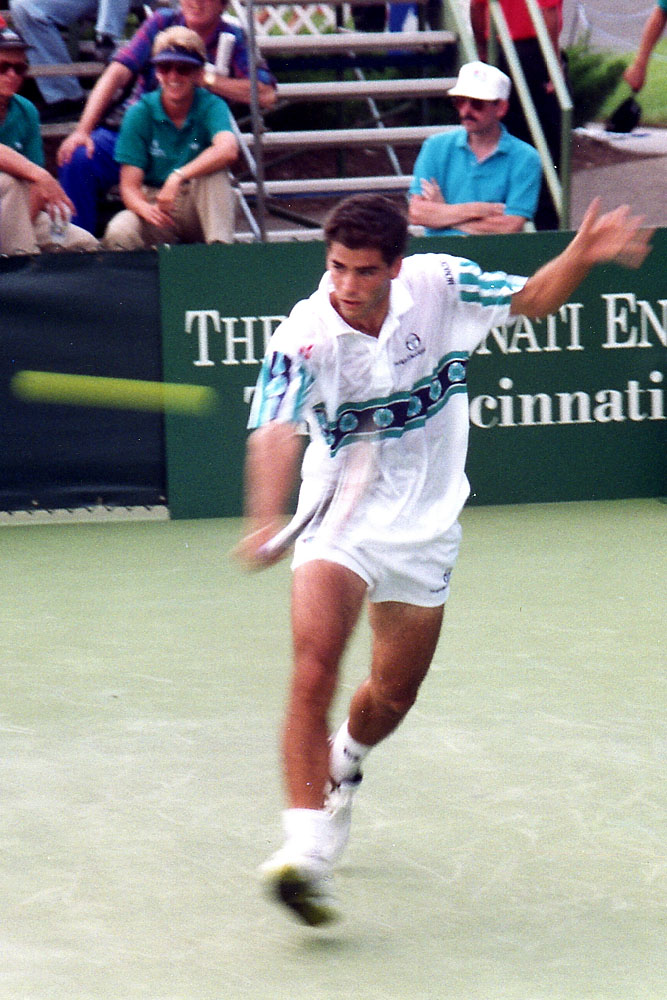
- Pete Sampras finished the year ranked world No. 1 for the first time in his career. He won eight titles during the season, including two majors at the Wimbledon Championships and the US Open. He also won a ATP Championship Series, Single Week event.

Details
- Duration: 4 Jan 1993 – 15 Nov 1993
- Edition: 4th
- Tournaments: 90
- Categories: Grand Slam (4); ATP Finals; ATP Championship Series; Single-week (9); ATP Championship Series (12); World Series (62); Team Events (2)

Achievements (singles)
- Most titles: (United States) Pete Sampras (8)
- Most finals: (Spain) Sergi Bruguera (Austria) Thomas Muster (United States) Pete Sampras (Germany) Michael Stich (9)
- Prize money leader: (United States) Pete Sampras ($4,571,675)
- Points leader: (United States) Pete Sampras (4128)

Awards
- Player of the year: (United States) Pete Sampras
- Doubles team of the year: (Canada) Grant Connell (United States) Patrick Galbraith
- Most improved player of the year: (United States) Todd Martin
- Newcomer of the year: (Australia) Pat Rafter
- Comeback player of the year: (Sweden) Mikael Pernfors

The IBM Association of Tennis Professionals (ATP) Tour is the elite tour for professional men's tennis organized by the ATP tour. The IBM ATP Tour includes the Grand Slam tournaments (organized by the International Tennis Federation (ITF)), the ATP Championship Series, Single Week, the ATP Championship Series, the ATP World Series, the ATP World Team Cup, the Davis Cup (organized by the ITF), the ATP Tour World Championships and the Grand Slam Cup (organized by the ITF).

== Schedule ==
This is the complete schedule of events on the 1993 IBM ATP Tour, with player progression documented from the quarterfinals stage.

Key

Grand Slam
ATP Tour World Championships
ATP Championship Series, Single Week
ATP Championship Series
ATP World Series
Team Events

=== January ===
Week	Tournament	Champions	Runners-up	Semifinalists	Quarterfinalists
4 Jan	Hopman Cup; Perth, Australia; ITF Mixed Team Championships; Hard (i) – 8 teams (RR)	Germany; 2–1	Spain	France; Czech Republic	Ukraine; United States; Switzerland; Australia
4 Jan	Australian Men's Hardcourt Championships; Adelaide, Australia; ATP World Series; Hard – $157,500 – 32S/16D; Singles – Doubles	(Sweden) Nicklas Kulti; 3–6, 7–5, 6–4	(Sweden) Christian Bergström	(United States) Jonathan Stark (Australia) Richard Fromberg	(United States) Alex O'Brien (Russia) Alexander Volkov (France) Cédric Pioline (Australia) John Fitzgerald
4 Jan	Australian Men's Hardcourt Championships; Adelaide, Australia; ATP World Series; Hard – $157,500 – 32S/16D; Singles – Doubles	(Australia) Todd Woodbridge (Australia) Mark Woodforde; 6–4, 7–5	(Australia) John Fitzgerald (Australia) Laurie Warder	(United States) Jonathan Stark (Australia) Richard Fromberg	(United States) Alex O'Brien (Russia) Alexander Volkov (France) Cédric Pioline (Australia) John Fitzgerald
4 Jan	Kuala Lumpur, Malaysia; ATP World Series; Hard – $275,000 – 32S/16D	(United States) Richey Reneberg; 6–3, 6–1	(France) Olivier Delaître	(Canada) Chris Pridham (Netherlands) Paul Haarhuis	(Haiti) Ronald Agénor (France) Fabrice Santoro (Germany) David Prinosil (Sweden) Lars Jonsson
4 Jan	Kuala Lumpur, Malaysia; ATP World Series; Hard – $275,000 – 32S/16D	(Netherlands) Jacco Eltingh (Netherlands) Paul Haarhuis; 7–5, 6–3	(Sweden) Henrik Holm (Norway) Bent-Ove Pedersen	(Canada) Chris Pridham (Netherlands) Paul Haarhuis	(Haiti) Ronald Agénor (France) Fabrice Santoro (Germany) David Prinosil (Sweden) Lars Jonsson
4 Jan	Qatar Open; Doha, Qatar; ATP World Series; Hard – $450,000 – 32S/16D; Singles – Doubles	(Germany) Boris Becker; 7–6^{(7–4)}, 4–6, 7–5	(Croatia) Goran Ivanišević	(Sweden) Stefan Edberg (Russia) Andrei Cherkasov	(Italy) Gianluca Pozzi (Spain) Javier Sánchez (Spain) Marcos Aurelio Gorriz (Germany) Patrik Kühnen
4 Jan	Qatar Open; Doha, Qatar; ATP World Series; Hard – $450,000 – 32S/16D; Singles – Doubles	(Germany) Boris Becker (Germany) Patrik Kühnen; 6–2, 6–4	(United States) Shelby Cannon (United States) Scott Melville	(Sweden) Stefan Edberg (Russia) Andrei Cherkasov	(Italy) Gianluca Pozzi (Spain) Javier Sánchez (Spain) Marcos Aurelio Gorriz (Germany) Patrik Kühnen
11 Jan	NSW Open; Sydney, Australia; ATP World Series; Hard – $275,000 – 32S/16D; Singles – Doubles	(United States) Pete Sampras; 7–6^{(9–7)}, 6–1	(Austria) Thomas Muster	(Israel) Amos Mansdorf (Italy) Omar Camporese	(Sweden) Nicklas Kulti (United States) David Wheaton (South Africa) Wayne Ferreira (Sweden) Jonas Svensson
11 Jan	NSW Open; Sydney, Australia; ATP World Series; Hard – $275,000 – 32S/16D; Singles – Doubles	(Australia) Sandon Stolle (Australia) Jason Stoltenberg; 6–3, 6–4	(United States) Luke Jensen (United States) Murphy Jensen	(Israel) Amos Mansdorf (Italy) Omar Camporese	(Sweden) Nicklas Kulti (United States) David Wheaton (South Africa) Wayne Ferreira (Sweden) Jonas Svensson
11 Jan	Benson and Hedges Open; Auckland, New Zealand; ATP World Series; Hard – $157,500 – 32S/16D; Singles – Doubles	(Russia) Alexander Volkov; 7–6^{(7–2)}, 6–4	(United States) MaliVai Washington	(Brazil) Luiz Mattar (Peru) Jaime Yzaga	(Australia) Jamie Morgan (United States) Chuck Adams (New Zealand) Kelly Evernden (New Zealand) Brett Steven
11 Jan	Benson and Hedges Open; Auckland, New Zealand; ATP World Series; Hard – $157,500 – 32S/16D; Singles – Doubles	(Canada) Grant Connell (United States) Patrick Galbraith; 6–3, 7–6	(Austria) Alex Antonitsch (Russia) Alexander Volkov	(Brazil) Luiz Mattar (Peru) Jaime Yzaga	(Australia) Jamie Morgan (United States) Chuck Adams (New Zealand) Kelly Evernden (New Zealand) Brett Steven
11 Jan	Indonesian Open; Jakarta, Indonesia; ATP World Series; Hard – $275,000 – 32S/16D	(United States) Michael Chang; 2–6, 6–2, 6–1	(Germany) Carl-Uwe Steeb	(Netherlands) Jacco Eltingh (Netherlands) Paul Haarhuis	(France) Rodolphe Gilbert (France) Fabrice Santoro (United States) Richey Reneberg (Germany) David Prinosil
11 Jan	Indonesian Open; Jakarta, Indonesia; ATP World Series; Hard – $275,000 – 32S/16D	(Italy) Diego Nargiso (France) Guillaume Raoux; 7–6, 6–7, 6–3	(Netherlands) Jacco Eltingh (Netherlands) Paul Haarhuis	(Netherlands) Jacco Eltingh (Netherlands) Paul Haarhuis	(France) Rodolphe Gilbert (France) Fabrice Santoro (United States) Richey Reneberg (Germany) David Prinosil
18 Jan; 25 Jan	Australian Open; Melbourne, Australia; Grand Slam; Hard – $1,942,170 – 128S/64D/32XD; Singles – Doubles – Mixed doubles	(United States) Jim Courier; 6–2, 6–1, 2–6, 7–5	(Sweden) Stefan Edberg	(Germany) Michael Stich (United States) Pete Sampras	(Czech Republic) Petr Korda (France) Guy Forget (New Zealand) Brett Steven (Sweden) Christian Bergström
18 Jan; 25 Jan	Australian Open; Melbourne, Australia; Grand Slam; Hard – $1,942,170 – 128S/64D/32XD; Singles – Doubles – Mixed doubles	(South Africa) Danie Visser (Australia) Laurie Warder; 6–4, 3–6, 6–4	(Australia) John Fitzgerald (Sweden) Anders Järryd	(Germany) Michael Stich (United States) Pete Sampras	(Czech Republic) Petr Korda (France) Guy Forget (New Zealand) Brett Steven (Sweden) Christian Bergström
18 Jan; 25 Jan	Australian Open; Melbourne, Australia; Grand Slam; Hard – $1,942,170 – 128S/64D/32XD; Singles – Doubles – Mixed doubles	(Spain) Arantxa Sánchez Vicario (Australia) Todd Woodbridge; 7–5, 6–4	(United States) Zina Garrison-Jackson (United States) Rick Leach	(Germany) Michael Stich (United States) Pete Sampras	(Czech Republic) Petr Korda (France) Guy Forget (New Zealand) Brett Steven (Sweden) Christian Bergström

=== February ===
Week	Tournament	Champions	Runners-up	Semifinalists	Quarterfinalists
1 Feb	Dubai Tennis Championships; Dubai, UAE; ATP World Series; Hard – $1,000,000 – 32S/16D; Singles – Doubles	(Czech Republic) Karel Nováček; 6–4, 7–5	(France) Fabrice Santoro	(United Kingdom) Jeremy Bates (Austria) Thomas Muster	(Russia) Alexander Volkov (Germany) Carl-Uwe Steeb (Russia) Andrei Cherkasov (Czech Republic) Slava Doseděl
1 Feb	Dubai Tennis Championships; Dubai, UAE; ATP World Series; Hard – $1,000,000 – 32S/16D; Singles – Doubles	(Australia) John Fitzgerald (Sweden) Anders Järryd; 6–2, 6–1	(Canada) Grant Connell (United States) Patrick Galbraith	(United Kingdom) Jeremy Bates (Austria) Thomas Muster	(Russia) Alexander Volkov (Germany) Carl-Uwe Steeb (Russia) Andrei Cherkasov (Czech Republic) Slava Doseděl
1 Feb	Open 13; Marseille, France; ATP World Series; Carpet (i) – $500,000 – 32S/16D; Singles – Doubles	(Switzerland) Marc Rosset; 6–2, 7–6^{(7–1)}	(Netherlands) Jan Siemerink	(Sweden) Henrik Holm (Switzerland) Jakob Hlasek	(Italy) Gianluca Pozzi (France) Arnaud Boetsch (France) Rodolphe Gilbert (Spain) Sergi Bruguera
1 Feb	Open 13; Marseille, France; ATP World Series; Carpet (i) – $500,000 – 32S/16D; Singles – Doubles	(France) Arnaud Boetsch (France) Olivier Delaître; 6–3, 7–6	(United States) Ivan Lendl (South Africa) Christo van Rensburg	(Sweden) Henrik Holm (Switzerland) Jakob Hlasek	(Italy) Gianluca Pozzi (France) Arnaud Boetsch (France) Rodolphe Gilbert (Spain) Sergi Bruguera
1 Feb	Volvo Tennis San Francisco; San Francisco, CA, United States; ATP World Series; Hard (i) – $275,000 – 32S/16D; Singles – Doubles	(United States) Andre Agassi; 6–2, 6–7^{(4–7)}, 6–2	(United States) Brad Gilbert	(United States) Jeff Tarango (United States) Jimmy Connors	(South Africa) Marcos Ondruska (Brazil) Jaime Oncins (United States) Chuck Adams (United States) Richey Reneberg
1 Feb	Volvo Tennis San Francisco; San Francisco, CA, United States; ATP World Series; Hard (i) – $275,000 – 32S/16D; Singles – Doubles	(United States) Scott Davis (Netherlands) Jacco Eltingh; 6–1, 4–6, 7–5	(United States) Patrick McEnroe (United States) Jonathan Stark	(United States) Jeff Tarango (United States) Jimmy Connors	(South Africa) Marcos Ondruska (Brazil) Jaime Oncins (United States) Chuck Adams (United States) Richey Reneberg
8 Feb	Muratti Time Indoor; Milan, Italy; ATP Championship Series; Carpet (i) – $675,000 – 32S/16D; Singles – Doubles	(Germany) Boris Becker; 6–3, 6–3	(Spain) Sergi Bruguera	(Czech Republic) Petr Korda (Australia) Wally Masur	(Italy) Omar Camporese (Sweden) Magnus Larsson (France) Arnaud Boetsch (Germany) Michael Stich
8 Feb	Muratti Time Indoor; Milan, Italy; ATP Championship Series; Carpet (i) – $675,000 – 32S/16D; Singles – Doubles	(Australia) Mark Kratzmann (Australia) Wally Masur; 4–6, 6–3, 6–4	(Netherlands) Tom Nijssen (Czech Republic) Cyril Suk	(Czech Republic) Petr Korda (Australia) Wally Masur	(Italy) Omar Camporese (Sweden) Magnus Larsson (France) Arnaud Boetsch (Germany) Michael Stich
8 Feb	Kroger St. Jude International; Memphis, TN, United States; ATP Championship Series; Hard (i) – $655,000 – 48S/24D	(United States) Jim Courier; 5–7, 7–6^{(7–4)}, 7–6^{(7–4)}	(United States) Todd Martin	(Israel) Amos Mansdorf (United States) Michael Chang	(United States) Jonathan Stark (United States) Dave Randall (United States) Andre Agassi (Russia) Andrei Chesnokov
8 Feb	Kroger St. Jude International; Memphis, TN, United States; ATP Championship Series; Hard (i) – $655,000 – 48S/24D	(Australia) Todd Woodbridge (Australia) Mark Woodforde; 6–4, 4–6, 6–3	(Netherlands) Jacco Eltingh (Netherlands) Paul Haarhuis	(Israel) Amos Mansdorf (United States) Michael Chang	(United States) Jonathan Stark (United States) Dave Randall (United States) Andre Agassi (Russia) Andrei Chesnokov
15 Feb	Comcast U.S. Indoor; Philadelphia, PA, United States; ATP Championship Series; Hard (i) – $575,000 – 32S/16D; Singles – Doubles	(Australia) Mark Woodforde; 5-4 RET	(United States) Ivan Lendl	(United States) Derrick Rostagno (United States) Pete Sampras	(Israel) Amos Mansdorf (United States) Michael Chang (United States) MaliVai Washington (United States) Richey Reneberg
15 Feb	Comcast U.S. Indoor; Philadelphia, PA, United States; ATP Championship Series; Hard (i) – $575,000 – 32S/16D; Singles – Doubles	(United States) Jim Grabb (United States) Richey Reneberg; 6–7, 6–3, 6–0	(South Africa) Marcos Ondruska (United States) Brad Pearce	(United States) Derrick Rostagno (United States) Pete Sampras	(Israel) Amos Mansdorf (United States) Michael Chang (United States) MaliVai Washington (United States) Richey Reneberg
15 Feb	Eurocard Open; Stuttgart, Germany; ATP Championship Series; Carpet (i) – $2,125,000 – 32S/16D; Singles – Doubles	(Germany) Michael Stich; 4–6, 7–5 7–6^{(7–4)}, 3–6, 7–5	(Netherlands) Richard Krajicek	(Germany) Boris Becker (Australia) Wally Masur	(South Africa) Wayne Ferreira (Ukraine) Andrei Medvedev (France) Cédric Pioline (Czech Republic) Petr Korda
15 Feb	Eurocard Open; Stuttgart, Germany; ATP Championship Series; Carpet (i) – $2,125,000 – 32S/16D; Singles – Doubles	(Australia) Mark Kratzmann (Australia) Wally Masur; 6–3, 7–6	(United States) Steve DeVries (Australia) David Macpherson	(Germany) Boris Becker (Australia) Wally Masur	(South Africa) Wayne Ferreira (Ukraine) Andrei Medvedev (France) Cédric Pioline (Czech Republic) Petr Korda
22 Feb	ABN AMRO World Tennis Tournament; Rotterdam, The Netherlands; ATP World Series; Carpet (i) – $575,000 – 32S/16D; Singles – Doubles	(Sweden) Anders Järryd; 6–3, 7–5	(Czech Republic) Karel Nováček	(Italy) Diego Nargiso (Russia) Alexander Volkov	(Denmark) Kenneth Carlsen (Italy) Omar Camporese (Croatia) Goran Prpić (Croatia) Goran Ivanišević
22 Feb	ABN AMRO World Tennis Tournament; Rotterdam, The Netherlands; ATP World Series; Carpet (i) – $575,000 – 32S/16D; Singles – Doubles	(Sweden) Henrik Holm (Sweden) Anders Järryd; 6–4, 7–6	(South Africa) David Adams (Russia) Andrei Olhovskiy	(Italy) Diego Nargiso (Russia) Alexander Volkov	(Denmark) Kenneth Carlsen (Italy) Omar Camporese (Croatia) Goran Prpić (Croatia) Goran Ivanišević
22 Feb	Purex Tennis Championships; Scottsdale, AZ, United States; ATP World Series; Hard – $275,000 – 32S/16D; Singles – Doubles	(United States) Andre Agassi; 6–2, 3–6, 6–3	(South Africa) Marcos Ondruska	(Russia) Andrei Chesnokov (Australia) Mark Woodforde	(United States) Derrick Rostagno (United States) Brad Gilbert (United States) MaliVai Washington (Spain) Emilio Sánchez
22 Feb	Purex Tennis Championships; Scottsdale, AZ, United States; ATP World Series; Hard – $275,000 – 32S/16D; Singles – Doubles	(United States) Mark Keil (United States) Dave Randall; 7–5, 6–4	(United States) Luke Jensen (Australia) Sandon Stolle	(Russia) Andrei Chesnokov (Australia) Mark Woodforde	(United States) Derrick Rostagno (United States) Brad Gilbert (United States) MaliVai Washington (Spain) Emilio Sánchez
22 Feb	Abierto Mexicano; Mexico City, Mexico; ATP World Series; Clay – $275,000 – 32S/16D; Singles – Doubles	(Austria) Thomas Muster; 6–2, 6–4	(Spain) Carlos Costa	(United States) Francisco Montana (Mexico) Oliver Fernandez	(United States) Jeff Tarango (Mexico) Leonardo Lavalle (Spain) Alberto Berasategui (Austria) Horst Skoff
22 Feb	Abierto Mexicano; Mexico City, Mexico; ATP World Series; Clay – $275,000 – 32S/16D; Singles – Doubles	(Mexico) Leonardo Lavalle (Brazil) Jaime Oncins; 7–6, 6–4	(Argentina) Horacio de la Peña (Mexico) Jorge Lozano	(United States) Francisco Montana (Mexico) Oliver Fernandez	(United States) Jeff Tarango (Mexico) Leonardo Lavalle (Spain) Alberto Berasategui (Austria) Horst Skoff

=== March ===
Week	Tournament	Champions	Runners-up	Semifinalists	Quarterfinalists
1 Mar	Copenhagen Open; Copenhagen, Denmark; ATP World Series; Carpet (i) – $175,000 – 32S/16D; Singles – Doubles	(Russia) Andrei Olhovskiy; 7–5, 3–6, 6–2	(Sweden) Nicklas Kulti	(New Zealand) Brett Steven (Sweden) Magnus Larsson	(Germany) David Prinosil (Croatia) Goran Prpić (Israel) Amos Mansdorf (France) Guillaume Raoux
1 Mar	Copenhagen Open; Copenhagen, Denmark; ATP World Series; Carpet (i) – $175,000 – 32S/16D; Singles – Doubles	(South Africa) David Adams (Russia) Andrei Olhovskiy; 6–3, 3–6, 6–3	(Czech Republic) Martin Damm (Czech Republic) Daniel Vacek	(New Zealand) Brett Steven (Sweden) Magnus Larsson	(Germany) David Prinosil (Croatia) Goran Prpić (Israel) Amos Mansdorf (France) Guillaume Raoux
1 Mar	Indian Wells Masters; Indian Wells CA, United States; ATP Championship Series, Single Week; Hard – $1,400,000 – 56S/28D; Singles – Doubles	(United States) Jim Courier; 6–3, 6–3, 6–1	(South Africa) Wayne Ferreira	(United States) Michael Chang (Russia) Alexander Volkov	(Switzerland) Marc Rosset (Czech Republic) Petr Korda (Argentina) Alberto Mancini (France) Fabrice Santoro
1 Mar	Indian Wells Masters; Indian Wells CA, United States; ATP Championship Series, Single Week; Hard – $1,400,000 – 56S/28D; Singles – Doubles	(France) Guy Forget (France) Henri Leconte; 4–6, 6–2, 7–6	(United States) Luke Jensen (United States) Scott Melville	(United States) Michael Chang (Russia) Alexander Volkov	(Switzerland) Marc Rosset (Czech Republic) Petr Korda (Argentina) Alberto Mancini (France) Fabrice Santoro
8 Mar	Zaragoza, Spain; ATP World Series; Carpet (i) – $175,000 – 32S/16D	(Czech Republic) Karel Nováček; 3–6, 6–2, 6–1	(Sweden) Jonas Svensson	(Sweden) Anders Järryd (Germany) Markus Zoecke	(Spain) Francisco Roig (Germany) Marc-Kevin Goellner (Czech Republic) Martin Damm (Germany) Arne Thoms
8 Mar	Zaragoza, Spain; ATP World Series; Carpet (i) – $175,000 – 32S/16D	(Czech Republic) Martin Damm (Czech Republic) Karel Nováček; 2–6, 6–4, 7–5	(United States) Mike Bauer (Czech Republic) David Rikl	(Sweden) Anders Järryd (Germany) Markus Zoecke	(Spain) Francisco Roig (Germany) Marc-Kevin Goellner (Czech Republic) Martin Damm (Germany) Arne Thoms
8 Mar; 15 Mar	Miami Masters; Key Biscayne, FL, United States; ATP Championship Series, Single Week; Hard – $1,400,000 – 96S/48D; Singles – Doubles	(United States) Pete Sampras; 6–3, 6–2	(United States) MaliVai Washington	(South Africa) Marcos Ondruska (Czech Republic) Petr Korda	(Australia) Mark Woodforde (United States) Patrick McEnroe (Sweden) Stefan Edberg (Netherlands) Richard Krajicek
8 Mar; 15 Mar	Miami Masters; Key Biscayne, FL, United States; ATP Championship Series, Single Week; Hard – $1,400,000 – 96S/48D; Singles – Doubles	(Netherlands) Richard Krajicek (Netherlands) Jan Siemerink; 6–2, 6–4	(United States) Patrick McEnroe (United States) Jonathan Stark	(South Africa) Marcos Ondruska (Czech Republic) Petr Korda	(Australia) Mark Woodforde (United States) Patrick McEnroe (Sweden) Stefan Edberg (Netherlands) Richard Krajicek
15 Mar	Grand Prix Hassan II; Casablanca, Morocco; ATP World Series; Clay – $175,000 – 32S/16D; Singles – Doubles	(Argentina) Guillermo Pérez Roldán; 6–4, 6–3	(Morocco) Younes El Aynaoui	(Austria) Gilbert Schaller (Austria) Horst Skoff	(Czech Republic) Martin Střelba (Spain) Alberto Berasategui (Belgium) Bart Wuyts (Argentina) Franco Davín
15 Mar	Grand Prix Hassan II; Casablanca, Morocco; ATP World Series; Clay – $175,000 – 32S/16D; Singles – Doubles	(United States) Mike Bauer (South Africa) Piet Norval; 7–5, 7–6	(Latvia) Ģirts Dzelde (Croatia) Goran Prpić	(Austria) Gilbert Schaller (Austria) Horst Skoff	(Czech Republic) Martin Střelba (Spain) Alberto Berasategui (Belgium) Bart Wuyts (Argentina) Franco Davín
22 Mar	Davis Cup by NEC: First Round; Melbourne, Australia - Grass; Modena, Italy - Carpet (i); Vienna, Austria - Clay (i); Calcutta, India - Grass; Barcelona, Spain - Clay; Kalmar, Sweden - Carpet (i); Aarhus, Denmark - Carpet (i); Moscow, Russia - Carpet (i)	First Round winners Australia 4–1; Italy 4–1; France 4–1; India 3-2; Netherlands 3–2; Sweden 5-0; Czech Republic 4–1; Germany 4–1	First Round losers United States; Brazil; Austria; Switzerland; Spain; Cuba; Denmark; Russia		
29 Mar	Salem Open Osaka; Osaka, Japan; ATP World Series; Hard – $500,000 – 32S/16D	(United States) Michael Chang; 6–4, 6–4	(Israel) Amos Mansdorf	(United States) Jim Courier (France) Stephane Simian	(France) Guillaume Raoux (United States) Jim Grabb (Japan) Shuzo Matsuoka (Canada) Greg Rusedski
29 Mar	Salem Open Osaka; Osaka, Japan; ATP World Series; Hard – $500,000 – 32S/16D	(United States) Mark Keil (South Africa) Christo van Rensburg; 7–6, 6–3	(Canada) Glenn Michibata (United States) David Pate	(United States) Jim Courier (France) Stephane Simian	(France) Guillaume Raoux (United States) Jim Grabb (Japan) Shuzo Matsuoka (Canada) Greg Rusedski
29 Mar	South African Open; Durban, South Africa; ATP World Series; Hard – $275,000 – 32S/16D	(United States) Aaron Krickstein; 6–3, 7–6^{(9–7)}	(South Africa) Grant Stafford	(South Africa) Wayne Ferreira (Russia) Alexander Volkov	(Germany) Jörn Renzenbrink (United States) Robbie Weiss (United States) Alex Reichel (Sweden) Lars Jonsson
29 Mar	South African Open; Durban, South Africa; ATP World Series; Hard – $275,000 – 32S/16D	(South Africa) Lan Bale (Zimbabwe) Byron Black; 7–6, 6–2	(South Africa) Johan de Beer (South Africa) Marcos Ondruska	(South Africa) Wayne Ferreira (Russia) Alexander Volkov	(Germany) Jörn Renzenbrink (United States) Robbie Weiss (United States) Alex Reichel (Sweden) Lars Jonsson
29 Mar	Estoril Open; Oeiras, Portugal; ATP World Series; Clay – $500,000 – 32S/16D; Singles – Doubles	(Ukraine) Andrei Medvedev; 6–4, 6–2	(Czech Republic) Karel Nováček	(Sweden) Magnus Gustafsson (Spain) Emilio Sánchez	(Sweden) Jonas Svensson (Sweden) Magnus Larsson (Spain) Sergi Bruguera (Italy) Renzo Furlan
29 Mar	Estoril Open; Oeiras, Portugal; ATP World Series; Clay – $500,000 – 32S/16D; Singles – Doubles	(South Africa) David Adams (Russia) Andrei Olhovskiy; 6–3, 7–5	(Netherlands) Menno Oosting (Germany) Udo Riglewski	(Sweden) Magnus Gustafsson (Spain) Emilio Sánchez	(Sweden) Jonas Svensson (Sweden) Magnus Larsson (Spain) Sergi Bruguera (Italy) Renzo Furlan

=== April ===
Week	Tournament	Champions	Runners-up	Semifinalists	Quarterfinalists
5 Apr	Torneo Godó; Barcelona, Spain; ATP Championship Series; Clay – $750,000 – 56S/28D; Singles – Doubles	(Ukraine) Andrei Medvedev; 6–7^{(7–9)}, 6–3, 7–5, 6–4	(Spain) Sergi Bruguera	(Sweden) Magnus Gustafsson (Austria) Thomas Muster	(United States) Andre Agassi (Russia) Yevgeny Kafelnikov (Netherlands) Richard Krajicek (United States) Ivan Lendl
5 Apr	Torneo Godó; Barcelona, Spain; ATP Championship Series; Clay – $750,000 – 56S/28D; Singles – Doubles	(United States) Shelby Cannon (United States) Scott Melville; 6–3, 7–5	(Spain) Sergio Casal (Spain) Emilio Sánchez	(Sweden) Magnus Gustafsson (Austria) Thomas Muster	(United States) Andre Agassi (Russia) Yevgeny Kafelnikov (Netherlands) Richard Krajicek (United States) Ivan Lendl
5 Apr	Japan Open; Tokyo, Japan; ATP Championship Series; Hard – $915,000 – 56S/28D; Singles – Doubles	(United States) Pete Sampras; 6–2, 6–2, 6–2	(United States) Brad Gilbert	(Sweden) Henrik Holm (Australia) Wally Masur	(United States) Jonathan Stark (Australia) Neil Borwick (Australia) Todd Woodbridge (United States) David Wheaton
5 Apr	Japan Open; Tokyo, Japan; ATP Championship Series; Hard – $915,000 – 56S/28D; Singles – Doubles	(United States) Ken Flach (United States) Rick Leach; 6–4, 7–5	(Canada) Glenn Michibata (United States) David Pate	(Sweden) Henrik Holm (Australia) Wally Masur	(United States) Jonathan Stark (Australia) Neil Borwick (Australia) Todd Woodbridge (United States) David Wheaton
12 Apr	Salem Open Hong Kong; Hong Kong, Hong Kong; ATP World Series; Hard – $275,000 – 32S/16D	(United States) Pete Sampras; 6–3, 6–7^{(1–7)}, 7–6^{(7–2)}	(United States) Jim Courier	(United States) Michael Chang (Israel) Amos Mansdorf	(United States) Patrick McEnroe (Denmark) Kenneth Carlsen (New Zealand) Brett Steven (United States) David Wheaton
12 Apr	Salem Open Hong Kong; Hong Kong, Hong Kong; ATP World Series; Hard – $275,000 – 32S/16D	(United States) David Wheaton (Australia) Todd Woodbridge; 6–1, 6–3	(Australia) Sandon Stolle (Australia) Jason Stoltenberg	(United States) Michael Chang (Israel) Amos Mansdorf	(United States) Patrick McEnroe (Denmark) Kenneth Carlsen (New Zealand) Brett Steven (United States) David Wheaton
12 Apr	Philips Open; Nice, France; ATP World Series; Clay – $275,000 – 32S/16D	(Germany) Marc-Kevin Goellner; 1–6, 6–4, 6–2	(United States) Ivan Lendl	(Sweden) Stefan Edberg (France) Fabrice Santoro	(Spain) Javier Sánchez (Argentina) Guillermo Pérez Roldán (Czech Republic) Petr Korda (Argentina) Franco Davín
12 Apr	Philips Open; Nice, France; ATP World Series; Clay – $275,000 – 32S/16D	(Australia) David Macpherson (Australia) Laurie Warder; 3-4 RET	(United States) Shelby Cannon (United States) Scott Melville	(Sweden) Stefan Edberg (France) Fabrice Santoro	(Spain) Javier Sánchez (Argentina) Guillermo Pérez Roldán (Czech Republic) Petr Korda (Argentina) Franco Davín
12 Apr	U.S. Men's Clay Court Championships; Charlotte, NC, US; ATP World Series; Clay – $275,000 – 32S/16D; Singles – Doubles	(Argentina) Horacio de la Peña; 3–6, 6–3, 6–4	(Peru) Jaime Yzaga	(Switzerland) Claudio Mezzadri (United States) Todd Martin	(Netherlands) Jacco Eltingh (United States) Derrick Rostagno (United States) Bryan Shelton (Sweden) Mikael Pernfors
12 Apr	U.S. Men's Clay Court Championships; Charlotte, NC, US; ATP World Series; Clay – $275,000 – 32S/16D; Singles – Doubles	(Sweden) Rikard Bergh (United States) Trevor Kronemann; 6–1, 6–2	(Argentina) Javier Frana (Mexico) Leonardo Lavalle	(Switzerland) Claudio Mezzadri (United States) Todd Martin	(Netherlands) Jacco Eltingh (United States) Derrick Rostagno (United States) Bryan Shelton (Sweden) Mikael Pernfors
19 Apr	Seoul, South Korea; ATP World Series; Hard – $175,000 – 32S/16D	(United States) Chuck Adams; 6–4, 6–4	(Australia) Todd Woodbridge	(Germany) Markus Zoecke (South Africa) Christo van Rensburg	(Austria) Alex Antonitsch (Japan) Shuzo Matsuoka (Netherlands) Michiel Schapers (France) Stephane Simian
19 Apr	Seoul, South Korea; ATP World Series; Hard – $175,000 – 32S/16D	(Sweden) Jan Apell (Sweden) Peter Nyborg; 5–7, 7–6, 6–2	(United Kingdom) Neil Broad (South Africa) Gary Muller	(Germany) Markus Zoecke (South Africa) Christo van Rensburg	(Austria) Alex Antonitsch (Japan) Shuzo Matsuoka (Netherlands) Michiel Schapers (France) Stephane Simian
19 Apr	Monte Carlo Masters; Roquebrune-Cap-Martin, France; ATP Championship Series, Single Week; Clay – $1,400,000 – 56S/28D; Singles – Doubles	(Spain) Sergi Bruguera; 7–6^{(7–2)}, 6–0	(France) Cédric Pioline	(Sweden) Stefan Edberg (Austria) Thomas Muster	(Ukraine) Andrei Medvedev (Sweden) Jonas Svensson (Spain) Carlos Costa (Spain) Àlex Corretja
19 Apr	Monte Carlo Masters; Roquebrune-Cap-Martin, France; ATP Championship Series, Single Week; Clay – $1,400,000 – 56S/28D; Singles – Doubles	(Sweden) Stefan Edberg (Czech Republic) Petr Korda; 6–2, 2–6, 7–5	(Netherlands) Paul Haarhuis (Netherlands) Mark Koevermans	(Sweden) Stefan Edberg (Austria) Thomas Muster	(Ukraine) Andrei Medvedev (Sweden) Jonas Svensson (Spain) Carlos Costa (Spain) Àlex Corretja
26 Apr	AT&T Challenge; Atlanta, GA, US; ATP World Series; Clay – $275,000 – 32S/16D; Singles – Doubles	(Netherlands) Jacco Eltingh; 7–6^{(7–1)}, 6–2	(United States) Bryan Shelton	(United States) Pete Sampras (United States) Jared Palmer	(Australia) Richard Fromberg (Argentina) Roberto Azar (Spain) Alberto Berasategui (Ecuador) Andrés Gómez
26 Apr	AT&T Challenge; Atlanta, GA, US; ATP World Series; Clay – $275,000 – 32S/16D; Singles – Doubles	(United States) Paul Annacone (United States) Richey Reneberg; 6–4, 7–6	(United States) Todd Martin (United States) Jared Palmer	(United States) Pete Sampras (United States) Jared Palmer	(Australia) Richard Fromberg (Argentina) Roberto Azar (Spain) Alberto Berasategui (Ecuador) Andrés Gómez
26 Apr	BMW Open; Munich, Germany; ATP World Series; Clay – $275,000 – 32S/16D; Singles – Doubles	(United States) Ivan Lendl; 7–6^{(7–2)} 6–3	(Germany) Michael Stich	(Spain) José Francisco Altur (France) Cédric Pioline	(France) Arnaud Boetsch (Czech Republic) Karel Nováček (Sweden) Nicklas Kulti (France) Gérard Solvès
26 Apr	BMW Open; Munich, Germany; ATP World Series; Clay – $275,000 – 32S/16D; Singles – Doubles	(Czech Republic) Martin Damm (Sweden) Henrik Holm; 6–0, 3–6, 7–5	(Czech Republic) Karel Nováček (Germany) Carl-Uwe Steeb	(Spain) José Francisco Altur (France) Cédric Pioline	(France) Arnaud Boetsch (Czech Republic) Karel Nováček (Sweden) Nicklas Kulti (France) Gérard Solvès
26 Apr	Trofeo Villa de Madrid; Madrid, Spain; ATP World Series; Clay – $775,000 – 32S/16D	(Sweden) Stefan Edberg; 6–3, 6–3, 6–2	(Spain) Sergi Bruguera	(Spain) Emilio Sánchez (Spain) Tomás Carbonell	(Spain) Àlex Corretja (Spain) Carlos Costa (Spain) Jordi Burillo (Argentina) Franco Davín
26 Apr	Trofeo Villa de Madrid; Madrid, Spain; ATP World Series; Clay – $775,000 – 32S/16D	(Spain) Tomás Carbonell (Spain) Carlos Costa; 7–6, 6–2	(United States) Luke Jensen (United States) Scott Melville	(Spain) Emilio Sánchez (Spain) Tomás Carbonell	(Spain) Àlex Corretja (Spain) Carlos Costa (Spain) Jordi Burillo (Argentina) Franco Davín

=== May ===
Week	Tournament	Champions	Runners-up	Semifinalists	Quarterfinalists
3 May	Hamburg Masters; Hamburg, Germany; ATP Championship Series, Single Week; Clay – $1,450,000 – 56S/28D; Singles – Doubles	(Germany) Michael Stich; 6–3, 6–7^{(1–7)}, 7–6^{(9–7)}, 6–4	(Russia) Andrei Chesnokov	(Spain) Emilio Sánchez (Germany) Bernd Karbacher	(Netherlands) Richard Krajicek (United States) Ivan Lendl (Argentina) Horacio de la Peña (Sweden) Magnus Gustafsson
3 May	Hamburg Masters; Hamburg, Germany; ATP Championship Series, Single Week; Clay – $1,450,000 – 56S/28D; Singles – Doubles	(Netherlands) Paul Haarhuis (Netherlands) Mark Koevermans; 7–6, 6–4	(Canada) Grant Connell (United States) Patrick Galbraith	(Spain) Emilio Sánchez (Germany) Bernd Karbacher	(Netherlands) Richard Krajicek (United States) Ivan Lendl (Argentina) Horacio de la Peña (Sweden) Magnus Gustafsson
3 May	Tampa, FL, USA; ATP World Series; Clay – $235,000 – 32S/16D	(Peru) Jaime Yzaga; 6–4, 6–2	(Australia) Richard Fromberg	(United States) Patrick McEnroe (United States) Bryan Shelton	(United States) Jeff Tarango (United States) Todd Martin (United States) David Wheaton (Australia) Wally Masur
3 May	Tampa, FL, USA; ATP World Series; Clay – $235,000 – 32S/16D	(United States) Todd Martin (United States) Derrick Rostagno; 6–3, 6–4	(United States) Kelly Jones (United States) Jared Palmer	(United States) Patrick McEnroe (United States) Bryan Shelton	(United States) Jeff Tarango (United States) Todd Martin (United States) David Wheaton (Australia) Wally Masur
10 May	Italian Open; Rome, Italy; ATP Championship Series, Single Week; Clay – $1,500,000 – 64S/32D; Singles – Doubles	(United States) Jim Courier; 6–1, 6–2, 6–2	(Croatia) Goran Ivanišević	(United States) Pete Sampras (United States) Michael Chang	(Argentina) Guillermo Pérez Roldán (Uruguay) Marcelo Filippini (Russia) Andrei Chesnokov (Spain) Sergi Bruguera
10 May	Italian Open; Rome, Italy; ATP Championship Series, Single Week; Clay – $1,500,000 – 64S/32D; Singles – Doubles	(Netherlands) Jacco Eltingh (Netherlands) Paul Haarhuis; 6–4, 7–6	(South Africa) Wayne Ferreira (Australia) Mark Kratzmann	(United States) Pete Sampras (United States) Michael Chang	(Argentina) Guillermo Pérez Roldán (Uruguay) Marcelo Filippini (Russia) Andrei Chesnokov (Spain) Sergi Bruguera
10 May	Coral Springs, FL, USA; ATP World Series; Clay – $200,000 – 32S/16D	(United States) Todd Martin; 6–3, 6–4	(United States) David Wheaton	(Australia) Wally Masur (United States) Aaron Krickstein	(United States) Patrick McEnroe (United States) Bryan Shelton (Sweden) Mikael Pernfors (United States) Alex O'Brien
10 May	Coral Springs, FL, USA; ATP World Series; Clay – $200,000 – 32S/16D	(United States) Patrick McEnroe (United States) Jonathan Stark; 6–4, 6–3	(United States) Paul Annacone (United States) Doug Flach	(Australia) Wally Masur (United States) Aaron Krickstein	(United States) Patrick McEnroe (United States) Bryan Shelton (Sweden) Mikael Pernfors (United States) Alex O'Brien
17 May	Internazionali Cassa di Risparmio; Bologna, Italy; ATP World Series; Clay – $275,000 – 32S/16D	(Spain) Jordi Burillo; 7–6^{(7–4)}, 6–7^{(7–9)}, 6–1	(Russia) Andrei Cherkasov	(Italy) Omar Camporese (Italy) Claudio Pistolesi	(South Africa) Wayne Ferreira (Argentina) Franco Davín (Czech Republic) Slava Doseděl (Japan) Shuzo Matsuoka
17 May	Internazionali Cassa di Risparmio; Bologna, Italy; ATP World Series; Clay – $275,000 – 32S/16D	(South Africa) Danie Visser (Australia) Laurie Warder; 4–6, 6–4, 6–4	(United States) Luke Jensen (United States) Murphy Jensen	(Italy) Omar Camporese (Italy) Claudio Pistolesi	(South Africa) Wayne Ferreira (Argentina) Franco Davín (Czech Republic) Slava Doseděl (Japan) Shuzo Matsuoka
17 May	World Team Cup; Düsseldorf, Germany	United States; 3–0	Germany		
24 May; 31 May	French Open; Paris, France; Grand Slam; Clay – $4,162,280 – 128S/64D/48XD; Singles – Doubles – Mixed doubles	(Spain) Sergi Bruguera; 6–4, 2–6, 6–2, 3–6, 6–3	(United States) Jim Courier	(Ukraine) Andrei Medvedev (Netherlands) Richard Krajicek	(United States) Pete Sampras (Sweden) Stefan Edberg (Czech Republic) Karel Nováček (Croatia) Goran Prpić
24 May; 31 May	French Open; Paris, France; Grand Slam; Clay – $4,162,280 – 128S/64D/48XD; Singles – Doubles – Mixed doubles	(United States) Luke Jensen (United States) Murphy Jensen; 6–4, 6–7, 6–4	(Germany) Marc-Kevin Goellner (Germany) David Prinosil	(Ukraine) Andrei Medvedev (Netherlands) Richard Krajicek	(United States) Pete Sampras (Sweden) Stefan Edberg (Czech Republic) Karel Nováček (Croatia) Goran Prpić
24 May; 31 May	French Open; Paris, France; Grand Slam; Clay – $4,162,280 – 128S/64D/48XD; Singles – Doubles – Mixed doubles	(Russia) Eugenia Maniokova (Russia) Andrei Olhovskiy; 6–2, 4–6, 6–4	(South Africa) Elna Reinach (South Africa) Danie Visser	(Ukraine) Andrei Medvedev (Netherlands) Richard Krajicek	(United States) Pete Sampras (Sweden) Stefan Edberg (Czech Republic) Karel Nováček (Croatia) Goran Prpić

=== June ===
Week	Tournament	Champions	Runners-up	Semifinalists	Quarterfinalists
7 Jun	Trofeo Kim Top Line; Florence, Italy; ATP World Series; Clay – $275,500 – 32S/16D	(Austria) Thomas Muster; 6–1, 7–5	(Spain) Jordi Burillo	(Spain) Àlex Corretja (Haiti) Ronald Agénor	(Belgium) Filip Dewulf (Argentina) Guillermo Pérez Roldán (Sweden) Magnus Gustafsson (Spain) Emilio Sánchez
7 Jun	Trofeo Kim Top Line; Florence, Italy; ATP World Series; Clay – $275,500 – 32S/16D	(Spain) Tomás Carbonell (Belgium) Libor Pimek; 7–6, 2–6, 6–1	(Netherlands) Mark Koevermans (United States) Greg Van Emburgh	(Spain) Àlex Corretja (Haiti) Ronald Agénor	(Belgium) Filip Dewulf (Argentina) Guillermo Pérez Roldán (Sweden) Magnus Gustafsson (Spain) Emilio Sánchez
7 Jun	Stella Artois Championships; London, Great Britain; ATP World Series; Grass – $600,000 – 56S/28D; Singles – Doubles	(Germany) Michael Stich; 6–3, 6–4	(South Africa) Wayne Ferreira	(United States) Todd Martin (Australia) Jamie Morgan	(Germany) Marc-Kevin Goellner (United States) David Witt (Germany) Boris Becker (Sweden) Stefan Edberg
7 Jun	Stella Artois Championships; London, Great Britain; ATP World Series; Grass – $600,000 – 56S/28D; Singles – Doubles	(Australia) Todd Woodbridge (Australia) Mark Woodforde; 6–4, 6–7, 6–3	(United Kingdom) Neil Broad (South Africa) Gary Muller	(United States) Todd Martin (Australia) Jamie Morgan	(Germany) Marc-Kevin Goellner (United States) David Witt (Germany) Boris Becker (Sweden) Stefan Edberg
7 Jun	Continental Grass Court Championships; Rosmalen, The Netherlands; ATP World Series; Grass – $275,000 – 32S/16D; Singles – Doubles	(France) Arnaud Boetsch; 3–6, 6–3, 6–3	(Australia) Wally Masur	(Russia) Alexander Volkov (United States) MaliVai Washington	(Italy) Gianluca Pozzi (Sweden) Henrik Holm (France) Cédric Pioline (Netherlands) Richard Krajicek
7 Jun	Continental Grass Court Championships; Rosmalen, The Netherlands; ATP World Series; Grass – $275,000 – 32S/16D; Singles – Doubles	(United States) Patrick McEnroe (United States) Jonathan Stark; 7–6, 1–6, 6–4	(South Africa) David Adams (Russia) Andrei Olhovskiy	(Russia) Alexander Volkov (United States) MaliVai Washington	(Italy) Gianluca Pozzi (Sweden) Henrik Holm (France) Cédric Pioline (Netherlands) Richard Krajicek
14 Jun	Garry Weber Open; Halle, Germany; ATP World Series; Grass – $350,000 – 32S/16D; Singles – Doubles	(France) Henri Leconte; 6–2, 6–3	(Ukraine) Andrei Medvedev	(United States) Jonathan Stark (Czech Republic) Petr Korda	(Sweden) Jonas Svensson (Germany) Hendrik Dreekmann (United States) Richey Reneberg (Germany) Karsten Braasch
14 Jun	Garry Weber Open; Halle, Germany; ATP World Series; Grass – $350,000 – 32S/16D; Singles – Doubles	(Czech Republic) Petr Korda (Czech Republic) Cyril Suk; 7–6, 5–7, 6–3	(United States) Mike Bauer (Germany) Marc-Kevin Goellner	(United States) Jonathan Stark (Czech Republic) Petr Korda	(Sweden) Jonas Svensson (Germany) Hendrik Dreekmann (United States) Richey Reneberg (Germany) Karsten Braasch
14 Jun	Genova, Italy; ATP World Series; Clay – $275,000 – 32S/16D	(Austria) Thomas Muster; 7–6^{(7–3)}, 6–4	(Sweden) Magnus Gustafsson	(Spain) Francisco Clavet (Spain) Javier Sánchez	(Spain) Tomás Carbonell (Italy) Claudio Pistolesi (Spain) Carlos Costa (Haiti) Ronald Agénor
14 Jun	Genova, Italy; ATP World Series; Clay – $275,000 – 32S/16D	(Spain) Sergio Casal (Spain) Emilio Sánchez; 6–3, 7–6	(Netherlands) Mark Koevermans (United States) Greg Van Emburgh	(Spain) Francisco Clavet (Spain) Javier Sánchez	(Spain) Tomás Carbonell (Italy) Claudio Pistolesi (Spain) Carlos Costa (Haiti) Ronald Agénor
14 Jun	Manchester Open; Manchester, Great Britain; ATP World Series; Grass – $275,000 – 32S/16D; Singles – Doubles	(Australia) Jason Stoltenberg; 6–1, 6–3	(Australia) Wally Masur	(France) Stephane Simian (Sweden) Henrik Holm	(Netherlands) Jacco Eltingh (France) Cédric Pioline (United Kingdom) Jeremy Bates (France) Guillaume Raoux
14 Jun	Manchester Open; Manchester, Great Britain; ATP World Series; Grass – $275,000 – 32S/16D; Singles – Doubles	(United States) Ken Flach (United States) Rick Leach; 6–4, 6–1	(South Africa) Stefan Kruger (Canada) Glenn Michibata	(France) Stephane Simian (Sweden) Henrik Holm	(Netherlands) Jacco Eltingh (France) Cédric Pioline (United Kingdom) Jeremy Bates (France) Guillaume Raoux
21 Jun; 28 Jun	Wimbledon Championships; London, Great Britain; Grand Slam; Grass – $3,592,425 – 128S/64D/64XD; Singles – Doubles – Mixed doubles	(United States) Pete Sampras; 7–6^{(7–3)}, 7–6^{(8–6)}, 3–6, 6–3	(United States) Jim Courier	(Germany) Boris Becker (Sweden) Stefan Edberg	(United States) Andre Agassi (Germany) Michael Stich (United States) Todd Martin (France) Cédric Pioline
21 Jun; 28 Jun	Wimbledon Championships; London, Great Britain; Grand Slam; Grass – $3,592,425 – 128S/64D/64XD; Singles – Doubles – Mixed doubles	(Australia) Todd Woodbridge (Australia) Mark Woodforde; 7–6, 6–3, 7–6	(Canada) Grant Connell (United States) Patrick Galbraith	(Germany) Boris Becker (Sweden) Stefan Edberg	(United States) Andre Agassi (Germany) Michael Stich (United States) Todd Martin (France) Cédric Pioline
21 Jun; 28 Jun	Wimbledon Championships; London, Great Britain; Grand Slam; Grass – $3,592,425 – 128S/64D/64XD; Singles – Doubles – Mixed doubles	(United States) Martina Navratilova (Australia) Mark Woodforde; 6–3, 6–4	(Netherlands) Manon Bollegraf (Netherlands) Tom Nijssen	(Germany) Boris Becker (Sweden) Stefan Edberg	(United States) Andre Agassi (Germany) Michael Stich (United States) Todd Martin (France) Cédric Pioline

=== July ===
Week	Tournament	Champions	Runners-up	Semifinalists	Quarterfinalists
5 Jul	Rado Swiss Open; Gstaad, Switzerland; ATP World Series; Clay – $375,000 – 32S/16D; Singles – Doubles	(Spain) Sergi Bruguera; 6–3, 6–4	(Czech Republic) Karel Nováček	(Germany) Marc-Kevin Goellner (Austria) Thomas Muster	(Spain) Àlex Corretja (France) Gérard Solvès (Germany) Markus Naewie (Australia) Jason Stoltenberg
5 Jul	Rado Swiss Open; Gstaad, Switzerland; ATP World Series; Clay – $375,000 – 32S/16D; Singles – Doubles	(France) Cédric Pioline (Switzerland) Marc Rosset; 6–3, 3–6, 7–6	(Netherlands) Hendrik Jan Davids (South Africa) Piet Norval	(Germany) Marc-Kevin Goellner (Austria) Thomas Muster	(Spain) Àlex Corretja (France) Gérard Solvès (Germany) Markus Naewie (Australia) Jason Stoltenberg
5 Jul	Miller Lite Hall of Fame Championships; Newport, RI, USA; ATP World Series; Grass – $175,000 – 32S/16D; Singles – Doubles	(Canada) Greg Rusedski; 7–5, 6–7^{(7–9)}, 7–6^{(7–5)}	(Argentina) Javier Frana	(Austria) Alex Antonitsch (Mexico) Luis Herrera	(Japan) Shuzo Matsuoka (South Africa) Grant Stafford (United States) Brian MacPhie (Germany) Arne Thoms
5 Jul	Miller Lite Hall of Fame Championships; Newport, RI, USA; ATP World Series; Grass – $175,000 – 32S/16D; Singles – Doubles	(Argentina) Javier Frana (South Africa) Christo van Rensburg; 4–6, 6–1, 7–6	(Zimbabwe) Byron Black (United States) Jim Pugh	(Austria) Alex Antonitsch (Mexico) Luis Herrera	(Japan) Shuzo Matsuoka (South Africa) Grant Stafford (United States) Brian MacPhie (Germany) Arne Thoms
5 Jul	Swedish Open; Båstad, Sweden; ATP World Series; Clay – $235,000 – 32S/16D; Singles – Doubles	(Austria) Horst Skoff; 7–5, 1–6, 6–0	(Haiti) Ronald Agénor	(Sweden) Christian Bergström (Sweden) Magnus Larsson	(Sweden) Nicklas Kulti (Spain) Marcos Aurelio Gorriz (Australia) Richard Fromberg (Spain) Tomás Carbonell
5 Jul	Swedish Open; Båstad, Sweden; ATP World Series; Clay – $235,000 – 32S/16D; Singles – Doubles	(Sweden) Henrik Holm (Sweden) Anders Järryd; 6–1, 3–6, 6–3	(United States) Brian Devening (Sweden) Tomas Nydahl	(Sweden) Christian Bergström (Sweden) Magnus Larsson	(Sweden) Nicklas Kulti (Spain) Marcos Aurelio Gorriz (Australia) Richard Fromberg (Spain) Tomás Carbonell
12 Jul	Davis Cup by NEC: Quarterfinals; Florence, Italy - Clay; Cannes, France - Clay; The Hague, Netherlands - Clay; Halle, Germany - Grass	Quarterfinal winners Australia 3-2; India 3-2; Sweden 4-1; Germany 4-1	First Round losers Italy; France; Netherlands; Czech Republic		
19 Jul	Mercedes Cup; Stuttgart, Germany; ATP Championship Series; Clay – $915,000 – 48S/28D; Singles – Doubles	(Sweden) Magnus Gustafsson; 6–3, 6–4, 3–6, 4–6, 6–4	(Germany) Michael Stich	(Germany) Marc-Kevin Goellner (Ukraine) Andrei Medvedev	(South Africa) Marcos Ondruska (Czech Republic) Karel Nováček (Spain) Javier Sánchez (Russia) Andrei Chesnokov
19 Jul	Mercedes Cup; Stuttgart, Germany; ATP Championship Series; Clay – $915,000 – 48S/28D; Singles – Doubles	(Netherlands) Tom Nijssen (Czech Republic) Cyril Suk; 3–6, 6–2, 6–3	(South Africa) Gary Muller (South Africa) Piet Norval	(Germany) Marc-Kevin Goellner (Ukraine) Andrei Medvedev	(South Africa) Marcos Ondruska (Czech Republic) Karel Nováček (Spain) Javier Sánchez (Russia) Andrei Chesnokov
19 Jul	Newsweek Tennis Classic; Washington, D.C., USA; ATP Championship Series; Hard – $500,000 – 56S/28D; Singles – Doubles	(Israel) Amos Mansdorf; 7–6^{(7–3)}, 7–5	(United States) Todd Martin	(United States) Aaron Krickstein (United States) Richey Reneberg	(Japan) Shuzo Matsuoka (Italy) Gianluca Pozzi (United States) MaliVai Washington (Czech Republic) Petr Korda
19 Jul	Newsweek Tennis Classic; Washington, D.C., USA; ATP Championship Series; Hard – $500,000 – 56S/28D; Singles – Doubles	(Zimbabwe) Byron Black (United States) Rick Leach; 6–4, 7–6	(Canada) Grant Connell (United States) Patrick Galbraith	(United States) Aaron Krickstein (United States) Richey Reneberg	(Japan) Shuzo Matsuoka (Italy) Gianluca Pozzi (United States) MaliVai Washington (Czech Republic) Petr Korda
26 Jul	Canadian Open; Montreal, Quebec, Canada; ATP Championship Series, Single Week; Hard – $1,400,000 – 56S/28D; Singles – Doubles	(Sweden) Mikael Pernfors; 2–6, 6–2, 7–5	(United States) Todd Martin	(United States) Richey Reneberg (Czech Republic) Petr Korda	(New Zealand) Brett Steven (United States) Andre Agassi (United States) Ivan Lendl (Russia) Alexander Volkov
26 Jul	Canadian Open; Montreal, Quebec, Canada; ATP Championship Series, Single Week; Hard – $1,400,000 – 56S/28D; Singles – Doubles	(United States) Jim Courier (The Bahamas) Mark Knowles; 6–1, 1–6, 7–6	(Canada) Glenn Michibata (United States) David Pate	(United States) Richey Reneberg (Czech Republic) Petr Korda	(New Zealand) Brett Steven (United States) Andre Agassi (United States) Ivan Lendl (Russia) Alexander Volkov
26 Jul	Dutch Open; Hilversum, The Netherlands; ATP World Series; Clay – $235,000 – 32S/16D; Singles – Doubles	(Spain) Carlos Costa; 6–1, 6–2, 6–3	(Sweden) Magnus Gustafsson	(Australia) Richard Fromberg (Spain) Javier Sánchez	(Netherlands) Paul Haarhuis (Spain) Francisco Clavet (Austria) Thomas Muster (Russia) Andrei Cherkasov
26 Jul	Dutch Open; Hilversum, The Netherlands; ATP World Series; Clay – $235,000 – 32S/16D; Singles – Doubles	(Netherlands) Jacco Eltingh (Netherlands) Paul Haarhuis; 4–6, 6–2, 7–5	(Netherlands) Hendrik Jan Davids (Belgium) Libor Pimek	(Australia) Richard Fromberg (Spain) Javier Sánchez	(Netherlands) Paul Haarhuis (Spain) Francisco Clavet (Austria) Thomas Muster (Russia) Andrei Cherkasov

=== August ===
Week	Tournament	Champions	Runners-up	Semifinalists	Quarterfinalists
2 Aug	Philips Head Cup; Kitzbühel, Austria; ATP World Series; Clay – $375,000 – 48S/24D	(Austria) Thomas Muster; 6–3, 7–5, 6–4	(Spain) Javier Sánchez	(Germany) Bernd Karbacher (Ukraine) Andrei Medvedev	(Croatia) Goran Ivanišević (Italy) Andrea Gaudenzi (Morocco) Younes El Aynaoui (Netherlands) Jan Siemerink
2 Aug	Philips Head Cup; Kitzbühel, Austria; ATP World Series; Clay – $375,000 – 48S/24D	(Argentina) Juan Garat (Argentina) Roberto Saad; 7–6, 2–6, 6–3	(South Africa) Marius Barnard (United States) Tom Mercer	(Germany) Bernd Karbacher (Ukraine) Andrei Medvedev	(Croatia) Goran Ivanišević (Italy) Andrea Gaudenzi (Morocco) Younes El Aynaoui (Netherlands) Jan Siemerink
2 Aug	Skoda Czech Open; Prague, Czech Republic; ATP World Series; Clay – $340,000 – 32S/16D; Singles – Doubles	(Spain) Sergi Bruguera; 7–5, 6–4	(Russia) Andrei Chesnokov	(Russia) Andrei Cherkasov (Sweden) Magnus Gustafsson	(Spain) Jordi Arrese (Spain) Carlos Costa (Netherlands) Paul Haarhuis (Sweden) Nicklas Kulti
2 Aug	Skoda Czech Open; Prague, Czech Republic; ATP World Series; Clay – $340,000 – 32S/16D; Singles – Doubles	(Netherlands) Hendrik Jan Davids (Belgium) Libor Pimek; 6–3, 7–6	(Mexico) Jorge Lozano (Brazil) Jaime Oncins	(Russia) Andrei Cherkasov (Sweden) Magnus Gustafsson	(Spain) Jordi Arrese (Spain) Carlos Costa (Netherlands) Paul Haarhuis (Sweden) Nicklas Kulti
2 Aug	Volvo Tennis/Los Angeles; Los Angeles, CA, US; ATP World Series; Hard – $275,000 – 32S/16D; Singles – Doubles	(Netherlands) Richard Krajicek; 0–6, 7–6^{(7–3)}, 7–6^{(7–5)}	(United States) Michael Chang	(United States) Pete Sampras (United States) Chuck Adams	(United States) Patrick McEnroe (Russia) Alexander Volkov (United States) Aaron Krickstein (Germany) Michael Stich
2 Aug	Volvo Tennis/Los Angeles; Los Angeles, CA, US; ATP World Series; Hard – $275,000 – 32S/16D; Singles – Doubles	(South Africa) Wayne Ferreira (Germany) Michael Stich; 7–6^{(7–4)}, 7–6^{(7–5)}	(Canada) Grant Connell (United States) Scott Davis	(United States) Pete Sampras (United States) Chuck Adams	(United States) Patrick McEnroe (Russia) Alexander Volkov (United States) Aaron Krickstein (Germany) Michael Stich
9 Aug	Thriftway ATP Championships; Mason, OH, US; ATP Championship Series, Single Week; Hard – $1,400,000 – 56S/28D; Singles – Doubles	(United States) Michael Chang; 7–5, 0–6, 6–4	(Sweden) Stefan Edberg	(United States) Pete Sampras (United States) Andre Agassi	(United States) Steve Bryan (United States) Brad Gilbert (Germany) Michael Stich (Australia) Jason Stoltenberg
9 Aug	Thriftway ATP Championships; Mason, OH, US; ATP Championship Series, Single Week; Hard – $1,400,000 – 56S/28D; Singles – Doubles	(United States) Andre Agassi (Czech Republic) Petr Korda; 6–4, 7–6	(Sweden) Stefan Edberg (Sweden) Henrik Holm	(United States) Pete Sampras (United States) Andre Agassi	(United States) Steve Bryan (United States) Brad Gilbert (Germany) Michael Stich (Australia) Jason Stoltenberg
9 Aug	Campionati Internazionali di San Marino; San Marino, San Marino; ATP World Series; Clay – $275,000 – 32S/16D	(Austria) Thomas Muster; 7–5, 7–5	(Italy) Renzo Furlan	(Czech Republic) David Rikl (Italy) Andrea Gaudenzi	(Czech Republic) Slava Doseděl (Spain) José Francisco Altur (Argentina) Guillermo Pérez Roldán (Morocco) Younes El Aynaoui
9 Aug	Campionati Internazionali di San Marino; San Marino, San Marino; ATP World Series; Clay – $275,000 – 32S/16D	(Argentina) Daniel Orsanic (Finland) Olli Rahnasto; 6–4, 1–6, 6–3	(Argentina) Juan Garat (Argentina) Roberto Saad	(Czech Republic) David Rikl (Italy) Andrea Gaudenzi	(Czech Republic) Slava Doseděl (Spain) José Francisco Altur (Argentina) Guillermo Pérez Roldán (Morocco) Younes El Aynaoui
16 Aug	RCA Championships; Indianapolis, IN, US; ATP Championship Series; Hard – $915,000 – 56S/28D; Singles – Doubles	(United States) Jim Courier; 7–5, 6–3	(Germany) Boris Becker	(Australia) Patrick Rafter (Brazil) Luiz Mattar	(United States) Pete Sampras (United States) Richey Reneberg (United States) Jimmy Arias (France) Cédric Pioline
16 Aug	RCA Championships; Indianapolis, IN, US; ATP Championship Series; Hard – $915,000 – 56S/28D; Singles – Doubles	(United States) Scott Davis (United States) Todd Martin; 3–6, 6–3, 6–2	(United States) Ken Flach (United States) Rick Leach	(Australia) Patrick Rafter (Brazil) Luiz Mattar	(United States) Pete Sampras (United States) Richey Reneberg (United States) Jimmy Arias (France) Cédric Pioline
16 Aug	Volvo International; New Haven, CT, US; ATP Championship Series; Hard – $915,000 – 56S/28D; Singles – Doubles	(Ukraine) Andrei Medvedev; 7–5, 6–4	(Czech Republic) Petr Korda	(Zimbabwe) Byron Black (United States) Andre Agassi	(Australia) Mark Woodforde (Italy) Stefano Pescosolido (Sweden) Jonas Svensson (United States) Ivan Lendl
16 Aug	Volvo International; New Haven, CT, US; ATP Championship Series; Hard – $915,000 – 56S/28D; Singles – Doubles	(Czech Republic) Cyril Suk (Czech Republic) Daniel Vacek; 7–5, 6–4	(United States) Steve DeVries (Australia) David Macpherson	(Zimbabwe) Byron Black (United States) Andre Agassi	(Australia) Mark Woodforde (Italy) Stefano Pescosolido (Sweden) Jonas Svensson (United States) Ivan Lendl
23 Aug	Croatia Open; Umag, Croatia; ATP World Series; Clay – $275,000 – 32S/28D; Singles – Doubles	(Austria) Thomas Muster; 7–5, 3–6, 6–3	(Spain) Alberto Berasategui	(Italy) Renzo Furlan (Sweden) Magnus Gustafsson	(Spain) Juan Gisbert-Schultze (Argentina) Guillermo Pérez Roldán (Austria) Horst Skoff (Argentina) Gabriel Markus
23 Aug	Croatia Open; Umag, Croatia; ATP World Series; Clay – $275,000 – 32S/28D; Singles – Doubles	(Belgium) Filip Dewulf (Belgium) Tom Vanhoudt; 6–4, 7–5	(Spain) Jordi Arrese (Spain) Francisco Roig	(Italy) Renzo Furlan (Sweden) Magnus Gustafsson	(Spain) Juan Gisbert-Schultze (Argentina) Guillermo Pérez Roldán (Austria) Horst Skoff (Argentina) Gabriel Markus
23 Aug	Waldbaum's Hamlet Cup; Long Island, NY, US; ATP World Series; Hard – $275,000 – 32S/16D; Singles – Doubles	(Switzerland) Marc Rosset; 6–4, 3–6, 6–1	(United States) Michael Chang	(Sweden) Stefan Edberg (Croatia) Goran Ivanišević	(Russia) Alexander Volkov (Spain) Sergi Bruguera (France) Cédric Pioline (Brazil) Luiz Mattar
23 Aug	Waldbaum's Hamlet Cup; Long Island, NY, US; ATP World Series; Hard – $275,000 – 32S/16D; Singles – Doubles	(Germany) Marc-Kevin Goellner (Germany) David Prinosil; 6–7, 7–5, 6–2	(France) Arnaud Boetsch (France) Olivier Delaître	(Sweden) Stefan Edberg (Croatia) Goran Ivanišević	(Russia) Alexander Volkov (Spain) Sergi Bruguera (France) Cédric Pioline (Brazil) Luiz Mattar
23 Aug	OTB International Open; Schenectady, NY, US; ATP World Series; Hard – $175,000 – 32S/16D; Singles – Doubles	(Sweden) Thomas Enqvist; 4–6, 6–3, 7–6^{(7–0)}	(New Zealand) Brett Steven	(Spain) Carlos Costa (Czech Republic) Karel Nováček	(United States) Ivan Lendl (Australia) Richard Fromberg (Spain) Javier Sánchez (Sweden) Mikael Pernfors
23 Aug	OTB International Open; Schenectady, NY, US; ATP World Series; Hard – $175,000 – 32S/16D; Singles – Doubles	(Germany) Bernd Karbacher (Russia) Andrei Olhovskiy; 2–6, 7–6, 6–1	(Zimbabwe) Byron Black (New Zealand) Brett Steven	(Spain) Carlos Costa (Czech Republic) Karel Nováček	(United States) Ivan Lendl (Australia) Richard Fromberg (Spain) Javier Sánchez (Sweden) Mikael Pernfors
30 Aug; 6 Sep	US Open; New York, USA; Grand Slam; Hard – $4,000,000 – 128S/64D/32XD; Singles – Doubles – Mixed doubles	(United States) Pete Sampras; 6–4, 6–4, 6–3	(France) Cédric Pioline	(Australia) Wally Masur (Russia) Alexander Volkov	(Ukraine) Andrei Medvedev (Sweden) Magnus Larsson (Austria) Thomas Muster (United States) Michael Chang
30 Aug; 6 Sep	US Open; New York, USA; Grand Slam; Hard – $4,000,000 – 128S/64D/32XD; Singles – Doubles – Mixed doubles	(United States) Ken Flach (United States) Rick Leach; 7–6, 6–4, 6–2	(Czech Republic) Martin Damm (Czech Republic) Karel Nováček	(Australia) Wally Masur (Russia) Alexander Volkov	(Ukraine) Andrei Medvedev (Sweden) Magnus Larsson (Austria) Thomas Muster (United States) Michael Chang
30 Aug; 6 Sep	US Open; New York, USA; Grand Slam; Hard – $4,000,000 – 128S/64D/32XD; Singles – Doubles – Mixed doubles	(Czech Republic) Helena Suková (Australia) Todd Woodbridge; 6–3, 7–6^{(8–6)}	(United States) Martina Navratilova (Australia) Mark Woodforde	(Australia) Wally Masur (Russia) Alexander Volkov	(Ukraine) Andrei Medvedev (Sweden) Magnus Larsson (Austria) Thomas Muster (United States) Michael Chang

=== September ===
Week	Tournament	Champions	Runners-up	Semifinalists	Quarterfinalists
13 Sep	Bucharest, Romania; ATP World Series; Clay – $500,000 – 32S/16D	(Croatia) Goran Ivanišević; 6–2, 7–6^{(7–5)}	(Russia) Andrei Cherkasov	(Argentina) Guillermo Pérez Roldán (Italy) Andrea Gaudenzi	(Romania) Dinu Pescariu (Sweden) Magnus Gustafsson (Spain) Francisco Clavet (Sweden) Tomas Nydahl
13 Sep	Bucharest, Romania; ATP World Series; Clay – $500,000 – 32S/16D	(Netherlands) Menno Oosting (Belgium) Libor Pimek; 7–6, 7–6	(Romania) George Cosac (Romania) Ciprian Petre Porumb	(Argentina) Guillermo Pérez Roldán (Italy) Andrea Gaudenzi	(Romania) Dinu Pescariu (Sweden) Magnus Gustafsson (Spain) Francisco Clavet (Sweden) Tomas Nydahl
13 Sep	Grand Prix Passing Shot; Bordeaux, France; ATP World Series; Hard – $330,000 – 32S/16D; Singles – Doubles	(Spain) Sergi Bruguera; 7–5, 6–2	(Italy) Diego Nargiso	(France) Arnaud Boetsch (Switzerland) Marc Rosset	(Sweden) Thomas Enqvist (Argentina) Javier Frana (Spain) Javier Sánchez (Czech Republic) Libor Němeček
13 Sep	Grand Prix Passing Shot; Bordeaux, France; ATP World Series; Hard – $330,000 – 32S/16D; Singles – Doubles	(Argentina) Pablo Albano (Argentina) Javier Frana; 7–6, 4–6, 6–3	(South Africa) David Adams (Russia) Andrei Olhovskiy	(France) Arnaud Boetsch (Switzerland) Marc Rosset	(Sweden) Thomas Enqvist (Argentina) Javier Frana (Spain) Javier Sánchez (Czech Republic) Libor Němeček
20 Sep	Davis Cup by NEC: Semifinals; Chandigarh, India - Grass; Borlänge, Sweden - Clay (i)	Semifinal winners Australia 5-0; Germany 5-0	First Round losers India; Sweden		
27 Sep	Campionati Internazionali di Sicilia; Palermo, Italy; ATP World Series; Clay – $290,000 – 32S/16D; Singles – Doubles	(Austria) Thomas Muster; 7–6^{(7–2)}, 7–5	(Spain) Sergi Bruguera	(Spain) Federico Sánchez (Italy) Andrea Gaudenzi	(France) Frédéric Fontang (Spain) Carlos Costa (Spain) Àlex Corretja (Brazil) Luiz Mattar
27 Sep	Campionati Internazionali di Sicilia; Palermo, Italy; ATP World Series; Clay – $290,000 – 32S/16D; Singles – Doubles	(Spain) Sergio Casal (Spain) Emilio Sánchez; 6–3, 6–3	(Argentina) Juan Garat (Mexico) Jorge Lozano	(Spain) Federico Sánchez (Italy) Andrea Gaudenzi	(France) Frédéric Fontang (Spain) Carlos Costa (Spain) Àlex Corretja (Brazil) Luiz Mattar
27 Sep	Kuala Lumpur, Malaysia; ATP World Series; Hard – $275,000 – 32S/16D	(United States) Michael Chang; 6–0 6–4	(Sweden) Jonas Svensson	(Australia) Neil Borwick (South Africa) Grant Stafford	(Netherlands) Jacco Eltingh (United Kingdom) Jeremy Bates (Austria) Alex Antonitsch (Sweden) Jonas Björkman
27 Sep	Kuala Lumpur, Malaysia; ATP World Series; Hard – $275,000 – 32S/16D	(Netherlands) Jacco Eltingh (Netherlands) Paul Haarhuis; 7–5, 4–6, 7–6	(Sweden) Jonas Björkman (Sweden) Lars-Anders Wahlgren	(Australia) Neil Borwick (South Africa) Grant Stafford	(Netherlands) Jacco Eltingh (United Kingdom) Jeremy Bates (Austria) Alex Antonitsch (Sweden) Jonas Björkman
27 Sep	Swiss Indoors; Basel, Switzerland; ATP World Series; Hard (i) – $775,000 – 32S/16D; Singles – Doubles	(Germany) Michael Stich; 6–4, 6–7^{(5–7)}, 6–3, 6–2	(Sweden) Stefan Edberg	(Switzerland) Marc Rosset (Czech Republic) Martin Damm	(Israel) Amos Mansdorf (Germany) David Prinosil (France) Arnaud Boetsch (Sweden) Magnus Larsson
27 Sep	Swiss Indoors; Basel, Switzerland; ATP World Series; Hard (i) – $775,000 – 32S/16D; Singles – Doubles	(Zimbabwe) Byron Black (United States) Jonathan Stark; 3–6, 7–5, 6–3	(United States) Brad Pearce (United States) Dave Randall	(Switzerland) Marc Rosset (Czech Republic) Martin Damm	(Israel) Amos Mansdorf (Germany) David Prinosil (France) Arnaud Boetsch (Sweden) Magnus Larsson

=== October ===
Week	Tournament	Champions	Runners-up	Semifinalists	Quarterfinalists
4 Oct	Australian Indoor Championships; Sydney, Australia; ATP Championship Series; Hard (i) – $875,000 – 32S/16D; Singles – Doubles	(Peru) Jaime Yzaga; 6–2, 4–6, 7–6^{(7–4)} 7–6^{(9–7)}	(Czech Republic) Petr Korda	(Croatia) Goran Ivanišević (South Africa) Wayne Ferreira	(United States) Jim Courier (Sweden) Mikael Pernfors (Australia) Mark Woodforde (United States) Jonathan Canter
4 Oct	Australian Indoor Championships; Sydney, Australia; ATP Championship Series; Hard (i) – $875,000 – 32S/16D; Singles – Doubles	(United States) Patrick McEnroe (United States) Richey Reneberg; 6–3, 7–5	(Germany) Alexander Mronz (Germany) Lars Rehmann	(Croatia) Goran Ivanišević (South Africa) Wayne Ferreira	(United States) Jim Courier (Sweden) Mikael Pernfors (Australia) Mark Woodforde (United States) Jonathan Canter
4 Oct	Athens International; Athens, Greece; ATP World Series; Clay – $175,000 – 32S/16D; Singles – Doubles	(Spain) Jordi Arrese; 6–4, 3–6, 6–3	(Spain) Alberto Berasategui	(Spain) Javier Sánchez (Argentina) Horacio de la Peña	(Italy) Andrea Gaudenzi (Italy) Renzo Furlan (Italy) Stefano Pescosolido (Austria) Gilbert Schaller
4 Oct	Athens International; Athens, Greece; ATP World Series; Clay – $175,000 – 32S/16D; Singles – Doubles	(Argentina) Horacio de la Peña (Mexico) Jorge Lozano; 3–6, 6–1, 6–2	(South Africa) Royce Deppe (United States) John Sullivan	(Spain) Javier Sánchez (Argentina) Horacio de la Peña	(Italy) Andrea Gaudenzi (Italy) Renzo Furlan (Italy) Stefano Pescosolido (Austria) Gilbert Schaller
4 Oct	Grand Prix de Tennis de Toulouse; Toulouse, France; ATP World Series; Hard (i) – $375,000 – 32S/16D; Singles – Doubles	(France) Arnaud Boetsch; 7–6^{(7–5)}, 3–6, 6–3	(France) Cédric Pioline	(Sweden) Christian Bergström (Russia) Andrei Chesnokov	(Morocco) Younes El Aynaoui (Sweden) Magnus Gustafsson (Switzerland) Marc Rosset (France) Rodolphe Gilbert
4 Oct	Grand Prix de Tennis de Toulouse; Toulouse, France; ATP World Series; Hard (i) – $375,000 – 32S/16D; Singles – Doubles	(Zimbabwe) Byron Black (United States) Jonathan Stark; 7–5, 7–6	(Germany) David Prinosil (Germany) Udo Riglewski	(Sweden) Christian Bergström (Russia) Andrei Chesnokov	(Morocco) Younes El Aynaoui (Sweden) Magnus Gustafsson (Switzerland) Marc Rosset (France) Rodolphe Gilbert
11 Oct	Tokyo Indoor; Tokyo, Japan; ATP Championship Series; Carpet (i) – $875,000 – 48S/24D; Singles – Doubles	(United States) Ivan Lendl; 6–4, 6–4	(United States) Todd Martin	(Canada) Greg Rusedski (Netherlands) Paul Haarhuis	(Sweden) Stefan Edberg (United States) Michael Chang (Ukraine) Andrei Medvedev (Germany) Boris Becker
11 Oct	Tokyo Indoor; Tokyo, Japan; ATP Championship Series; Carpet (i) – $875,000 – 48S/24D; Singles – Doubles	(Canada) Grant Connell (United States) Patrick Galbraith; 7–5, 6–3	(United States) Luke Jensen (United States) Murphy Jensen	(Canada) Greg Rusedski (Netherlands) Paul Haarhuis	(Sweden) Stefan Edberg (United States) Michael Chang (Ukraine) Andrei Medvedev (Germany) Boris Becker
11 Oct	Bolzano, Italy; ATP World Series; Carpet (i) – $290,000 – 32S/16D	(United States) Jonathan Stark; 6–3, 6–2	(France) Cédric Pioline	(France) Olivier Delaître (Russia) Andrei Olhovskiy	(Germany) David Prinosil (Germany) Thomas Gollwitzer (Sweden) Thomas Johansson (Netherlands) Tom Nijssen
11 Oct	Bolzano, Italy; ATP World Series; Carpet (i) – $290,000 – 32S/16D	(Netherlands) Hendrik Jan Davids (South Africa) Piet Norval; 6–3, 6–2	(South Africa) David Adams (Russia) Andrei Olhovskiy	(France) Olivier Delaître (Russia) Andrei Olhovskiy	(Germany) David Prinosil (Germany) Thomas Gollwitzer (Sweden) Thomas Johansson (Netherlands) Tom Nijssen
11 Oct	Tel Aviv Open; Tel Aviv, Israel; ATP World Series; Hard – $175,000 – 32S/16D; Singles – Doubles	(Italy) Stefano Pescosolido; 7–6^{(7–5)}, 7–5	(Israel) Amos Mansdorf	(Austria) Thomas Muster (Russia) Andrei Cherkasov	(Israel) Gilad Bloom (Spain) Javier Sánchez (Italy) Andrea Gaudenzi (South Africa) Grant Stafford
11 Oct	Tel Aviv Open; Tel Aviv, Israel; ATP World Series; Hard – $175,000 – 32S/16D; Singles – Doubles	(Spain) Sergio Casal (Spain) Emilio Sánchez; 6–4, 6–4	(United States) Mike Bauer (Czech Republic) David Rikl	(Austria) Thomas Muster (Russia) Andrei Cherkasov	(Israel) Gilad Bloom (Spain) Javier Sánchez (Italy) Andrea Gaudenzi (South Africa) Grant Stafford
18 Oct	CA-TennisTrophy; Vienna, Austria; ATP World Series; Carpet (i) – $275,000 – 32S/16D; Singles – Doubles	(Croatia) Goran Ivanišević; 4–6, 6–4, 6–4, 7–6^{(7–3)}	(Austria) Thomas Muster	(Sweden) Thomas Enqvist (Czech Republic) Petr Korda	(Netherlands) Jan Siemerink (United States) Richey Reneberg (Switzerland) Marc Rosset (Zimbabwe) Byron Black
18 Oct	CA-TennisTrophy; Vienna, Austria; ATP World Series; Carpet (i) – $275,000 – 32S/16D; Singles – Doubles	(Zimbabwe) Byron Black (United States) Jonathan Stark; 6–3, 7–6	(United States) Mike Bauer (Germany) David Prinosil	(Sweden) Thomas Enqvist (Czech Republic) Petr Korda	(Netherlands) Jan Siemerink (United States) Richey Reneberg (Switzerland) Marc Rosset (Zimbabwe) Byron Black
18 Oct	Grand Prix de Tennis de Lyon; Lyon, France; ATP World Series; Carpet (i) – $575,000 – 32S/16D; Singles – Doubles	(United States) Pete Sampras; 7–6^{(7–5)}, 1–6, 7–5	(France) Cédric Pioline	(Switzerland) Jakob Hlasek (Australia) Richard Fromberg	(France) Stephane Simian (France) Arnaud Boetsch (Czech Republic) Martin Damm (France) Lionel Barthez
18 Oct	Grand Prix de Tennis de Lyon; Lyon, France; ATP World Series; Carpet (i) – $575,000 – 32S/16D; Singles – Doubles	(South Africa) Gary Muller (South Africa) Danie Visser; 6–3, 7–6	(South Africa) John-Laffnie de Jager (South Africa) Stefan Kruger	(Switzerland) Jakob Hlasek (Australia) Richard Fromberg	(France) Stephane Simian (France) Arnaud Boetsch (Czech Republic) Martin Damm (France) Lionel Barthez
18 Oct	Salem Open-Beijing; Beijing, China; ATP World Series; Carpet (i) – $275,000 – 32S/16D; Singles – Doubles	(United States) Michael Chang; 7–6^{(7–5)}, 6–7^{(6–8)}, 6–4	(Canada) Greg Rusedski	(United States) Tommy Ho (United States) Brad Gilbert	(Sweden) Christian Bergström (United States) Chuck Adams (Sweden) Jonas Svensson (Sweden) Magnus Gustafsson
18 Oct	Salem Open-Beijing; Beijing, China; ATP World Series; Carpet (i) – $275,000 – 32S/16D; Singles – Doubles	(United States) Paul Annacone (United States) Doug Flach; 7–6, 6–3	(Netherlands) Jacco Eltingh (Netherlands) Paul Haarhuis	(United States) Tommy Ho (United States) Brad Gilbert	(Sweden) Christian Bergström (United States) Chuck Adams (Sweden) Jonas Svensson (Sweden) Magnus Gustafsson
25 Oct	Stockholm Open; Stockholm, Sweden; ATP Championship Series, Single Week; Carpet (i) – $1,400,000 – 48S/24D; Singles – Doubles	(Germany) Michael Stich; 4–6, 7–6^{(8–6)} 7–6^{(7–3)}, 6–2	(Croatia) Goran Ivanišević	(United States) MaliVai Washington (Switzerland) Marc Rosset	(France) Arnaud Boetsch (Sweden) Jonas Svensson (Sweden) Stefan Edberg (Czech Republic) Petr Korda
25 Oct	Stockholm Open; Stockholm, Sweden; ATP Championship Series, Single Week; Carpet (i) – $1,400,000 – 48S/24D; Singles – Doubles	(Australia) Todd Woodbridge (Australia) Mark Woodforde; 7–6, 5–7, 7–6	(South Africa) Gary Muller (South Africa) Danie Visser	(United States) MaliVai Washington (Switzerland) Marc Rosset	(France) Arnaud Boetsch (Sweden) Jonas Svensson (Sweden) Stefan Edberg (Czech Republic) Petr Korda
25 Oct	Hellmann's Cup; Santiago, Chile; ATP World Series; Clay – $200,000 – 32S/16D; Singles – Doubles	(Argentina) Javier Frana; 7–5, 3–6, 6–3	(Spain) Emilio Sánchez	(Peru) Jaime Yzaga (Uruguay) Marcelo Filippini	(Italy) Renzo Furlan (Spain) Albert Costa (Argentina) Horacio de la Peña (Spain) Jordi Burillo
25 Oct	Hellmann's Cup; Santiago, Chile; ATP World Series; Clay – $200,000 – 32S/16D; Singles – Doubles	(United States) Mike Bauer (Czech Republic) David Rikl; 7–6, 6–4	(Sweden) Christer Allgårdh (United States) Brian Devening	(Peru) Jaime Yzaga (Uruguay) Marcelo Filippini	(Italy) Renzo Furlan (Spain) Albert Costa (Argentina) Horacio de la Peña (Spain) Jordi Burillo

=== November ===
Week	Tournament	Champions	Runners-up	Semifinalists	Quarterfinalists
1 Nov	Paris Masters; Paris, France; ATP Championship Series, Single Week; Carpet (i) – $1,915,000 – 48S/24D; Singles – Doubles	(Croatia) Goran Ivanišević; 6–4, 6–2, 7–6^{(7–2)}	(Ukraine) Andrei Medvedev	(Sweden) Stefan Edberg (France) Arnaud Boetsch	(United States) Pete Sampras (Germany) Michael Stich (Germany) Boris Becker (Australia) Mark Woodforde
1 Nov	Paris Masters; Paris, France; ATP Championship Series, Single Week; Carpet (i) – $1,915,000 – 48S/24D; Singles – Doubles	(Zimbabwe) Byron Black (United States) Jonathan Stark; 7–6, 6–4	(Netherlands) Tom Nijssen (Czech Republic) Cyril Suk	(Sweden) Stefan Edberg (France) Arnaud Boetsch	(United States) Pete Sampras (Germany) Michael Stich (Germany) Boris Becker (Australia) Mark Woodforde
1 Nov	Sul America Open; São Paulo, Brazil; ATP World Series; Clay – $175,000 – 32S/16D; Singles – Doubles	(Spain) Alberto Berasategui; 6–4, 6–3	(Czech Republic) Slava Doseděl	(Spain) Àlex Corretja (Spain) Jordi Arrese	(Spain) Francisco Clavet (Morocco) Younes El Aynaoui (Austria) Gilbert Schaller (Brazil) Fernando Meligeni
1 Nov	Sul America Open; São Paulo, Brazil; ATP World Series; Clay – $175,000 – 32S/16D; Singles – Doubles	(Spain) Sergio Casal (Spain) Emilio Sánchez; 4–6, 7–6, 6–4	(Argentina) Pablo Albano (Argentina) Javier Frana	(Spain) Àlex Corretja (Spain) Jordi Arrese	(Spain) Francisco Clavet (Morocco) Younes El Aynaoui (Austria) Gilbert Schaller (Brazil) Fernando Meligeni
8 Nov	Topper South American Open; Buenos Aires, Argentina; ATP World Series; Clay – $275,000 – 32S/16D; Singles – Doubles	(Spain) Carlos Costa; 3–6, 6–1, 6–4	(Spain) Alberto Berasategui	(Spain) Jordi Arrese (Argentina) Javier Frana	(Morocco) Younes El Aynaoui (Austria) Gilbert Schaller (Spain) Emilio Sánchez (Argentina) Daniel Orsanic
8 Nov	Topper South American Open; Buenos Aires, Argentina; ATP World Series; Clay – $275,000 – 32S/16D; Singles – Doubles	(Spain) Tomás Carbonell (Spain) Carlos Costa; 6–4, 6–4	(Spain) Sergio Casal (Spain) Emilio Sánchez	(Spain) Jordi Arrese (Argentina) Javier Frana	(Morocco) Younes El Aynaoui (Austria) Gilbert Schaller (Spain) Emilio Sánchez (Argentina) Daniel Orsanic
8 Nov	Kremlin Cup; Moscow, Russia; ATP World Series; Carpet (i) – $325,000 – 32S/16D; Singles – Doubles	(Switzerland) Marc Rosset; 6–4, 6–3	(Germany) Patrik Kühnen	(Ukraine) Dimitri Poliakov (Germany) Karsten Braasch	(Netherlands) Paul Haarhuis (Czech Republic) Martin Damm (Russia) Andrei Olhovskiy (Russia) Andrei Merinov
8 Nov	Kremlin Cup; Moscow, Russia; ATP World Series; Carpet (i) – $325,000 – 32S/16D; Singles – Doubles	(Netherlands) Jacco Eltingh (Netherlands) Paul Haarhuis; 6–1 ret	(Sweden) Jan Apell (Sweden) Jonas Björkman	(Ukraine) Dimitri Poliakov (Germany) Karsten Braasch	(Netherlands) Paul Haarhuis (Czech Republic) Martin Damm (Russia) Andrei Olhovskiy (Russia) Andrei Merinov
8 Nov	European Community Championships; Antwerp, Belgium; ATP World Series; Carpet (i) – $1,085,000 – 32S/16D; Singles – Doubles	(United States) Pete Sampras; 6–1, 6–4	(Sweden) Magnus Gustafsson	(France) Cédric Pioline (Germany) Boris Becker	(Sweden) Nicklas Kulti (Croatia) Goran Ivanišević (Sweden) Magnus Larsson (Germany) Michael Stich
8 Nov	European Community Championships; Antwerp, Belgium; ATP World Series; Carpet (i) – $1,085,000 – 32S/16D; Singles – Doubles	(Canada) Grant Connell (United States) Patrick Galbraith; 6–3, 7–6	(South Africa) Wayne Ferreira (Spain) Javier Sánchez	(France) Cédric Pioline (Germany) Boris Becker	(Sweden) Nicklas Kulti (Croatia) Goran Ivanišević (Sweden) Magnus Larsson (Germany) Michael Stich
15 Nov	ATP Tour World Championships Singles; Frankfurt, Germany; ATP Tour World Championships; Carpet (i) – $2,750,000 – 8S (RR); Singles	(Germany) Michael Stich; 7–6^{(7–3)}, 2–6, 7–6^{(9–7)}, 6–2	(United States) Pete Sampras	(Ukraine) Andrei Medvedev (Croatia) Goran Ivanišević	(Spain) Sergi Bruguera (Sweden) Stefan Edberg (United States) Michael Chang (United States) Jim Courier
22 Nov	ATP Tour World Championships Doubles; Johannesburg, South Africa; ATP Tour World Championships; Hard (i) – $1,200,000 – 8D (RR); Doubles	(Netherlands) Jacco Eltingh (Netherlands) Paul Haarhuis; 7–6^{(7–4)}, 7–6^{(7–5)}, 6–4	(Australia) Todd Woodbridge (Australia) Mark Woodforde	(Canada) Grant Connell / (United States) Patrick Galbraith (South Africa) David Adams / (Russia) Andrei Olhovskiy	
29 Nov	Davis Cup by NEC: Final; Düsseldorf, Germany - Clay (i)	Germany; 4-1	Australia		

=== December ===
Week	Tournament	Champions	Runners-up	Semifinalists	Quarterfinalists
6 Dec	Grand Slam Cup; Munich, Germany; Grand Slam Cup; Carpet (i) – $6,000,000 – 16S	(Czech Republic) Petr Korda; 2–6, 6–4, 7–6^{(7–5)}, 2–6, 11–9	(Germany) Michael Stich	(United States) Pete Sampras (Sweden) Stefan Edberg	(United States) Michael Chang (Spain) Sergi Bruguera (Australia) Brett Steven (South Africa) Wayne Ferreira

== ATP rankings ==
Year-start ranking (11 January 1993)
Rk	Name	Nation
1	Jim Courier	USA
2	Stefan Edberg	SWE
3	Pete Sampras	USA
4	Boris Becker	GER
5	Goran Ivanišević	CRO
6	Michael Chang	USA
7	Petr Korda	CZE
8	Ivan Lendl	USA
9	Andre Agassi	USA
10	Richard Krajicek	NED
11	Wayne Ferreira	RSA
12	Guy Forget	FRA
13	Carlos Costa	ESP
14	MaliVai Washington	USA
15	Michael Stich	GER
16	Sergi Bruguera	ESP
17	Alexander Volkov	RUS
18	Thomas Muster	AUT
19	Henrik Holm	SWE
20	John McEnroe	USA

Year-end rankings 1993 (27 December 1993)
Rk	Name	Nation	Points	High	Low	Change
1	Pete Sampras	USA	4128	1	3	▲2
2	Michael Stich	GER	3445	2	15	▲13
3	Jim Courier	USA	3390	1	3	▼2
4	Sergi Bruguera	ESP	2590	4	17	▲12
5	Stefan Edberg	SWE	2571	2	6	▼3
6	Andrei Medvedev	UKR	2415	6	24	▲17
7	Goran Ivanišević	CRO	2186	5	12	▼2
8	Michael Chang	USA	2154	5	11	▼2
9	Thomas Muster	AUT	2033	9	18	▲9
10	Cédric Pioline	FRA	2012	10	35	▲23
11	Boris Becker	GER	1958	3	11	▼7
12	Petr Korda	CZE	1742	5	13	▼5
13	Todd Martin	USA	1695	13	96	▲76
14	Magnus Gustafsson	SWE	1586	14	63	▲34
15	Richard Krajicek	NED	1572	8	15	▼5
16	Marc Rosset	SUI	1485	15	44	▲22
17	Karel Nováček	CZE	1412	13	23	▲5
18	Alexander Volkov	RUS	1382	14	22	▼1
19	Ivan Lendl	USA	1362	6	19	▼9
20	Arnaud Boetsch	FRA	1344	20	29	▲6

== Statistical information ==
List of players and titles won, alphabetically by last name:

- (United States) Chuck Adams - Seoul (1)
- (United States) Andre Agassi - San Francisco, Scottsdale (2)
- (Spain) Jordi Arrese - Athens (1)
- (Germany) Boris Becker - Doha, Milan (2)
- (Spain) Alberto Berasategui - São Paulo (1)
- (France) Arnaud Boetsch - Rosmalen, Toulouse (2)
- (Spain) Sergi Bruguera - Monte Carlo Masters, French Open, Gstaad, Prague, Bordeaux (5)
- (Spain) Jordi Burillo - Bologna (1)
- (United States) Michael Chang - Jakarta, Osaka, Cincinnati Masters, Kuala Lumpur Indoors, Beijing (5)
- (Spain) Carlos Costa - Hilversum, Buenos Aires (2)
- (United States) Jim Courier - Australian Open, Memphis, Indian Wells Masters, Rome Masters, Indianapolis (5)
- (Sweden) Stefan Edberg - Madrid (1)
- (Netherlands) Jacco Eltingh - Atlanta (1)
- (Sweden) Thomas Enqvist - Schenectady (1)
- (Argentina) Javier Frana - Santiago (1)
- (Germany) Marc-Kevin Goellner - Nice (1)
- (Sweden) Magnus Gustafsson - Stuttgart (1)
- (Croatia) Goran Ivanišević - Bucharest, Vienna, Paris Masters (3)
- (Sweden) Anders Järryd - Rotterdam (1)
- (Netherlands) Richard Krajicek - Los Angeles (1)
- (United States) Aaron Krickstein - Durban (1)
- (Sweden) Nicklas Kulti - Adelaide (1)
- (France) Henri Leconte - Halle (1)
- (United States) Ivan Lendl - Munich, Tokyo Indoors (2)
- (Israel) Amos Mansdorf - Washington, D.C. (1)
- (United States) Todd Martin - Coral Springs (1)
- (Ukraine) Andrei Medvedev - Estoril, Barcelona, New Haven (3)
- (Austria) Thomas Muster - Mexico City, Florence, Genova, Kitzbühel, San Marino, Umag, Palermo (7)
- (Czech Republic) Karel Nováček - Dubai, Zaragoza (2)
- (Russia) Andrei Olhovskiy - Copenhagen (1)
- (Argentina) Horacio de la Peña - Charlotte (1)
- (Argentina) Guillermo Pérez Roldán - Casablanca (1)
- (Sweden) Mikael Pernfors - Canada Masters (1)
- (Italy) Stefano Pescosolido - Tel Aviv (1)
- (United States) Richey Reneberg - Kuala Lumpur (1)
- (Switzerland) Marc Rosset - Marseille, Long Island, Moscow (3)
- (Canada) Greg Rusedski - Newport (1)
- (United States) Pete Sampras - Sydney, Miami Masters, Tokyo, Hong Kong, Wimbledon, US Open, Lyon, Antwerp (8)
- (Austria) Horst Skoff - Båstad (1)
- (United States) Jonathan Stark - Bolzano (1)
- (Germany) Michael Stich - Stuttgart, Hamburg Masters, London, Basel, Stockholm Masters, Season-Ending Championships (6)
- (Australia) Jason Stoltenberg - Manchester (1)
- (Russia) Alexander Volkov - Auckland (1)
- (Australia) Mark Woodforde - Philadelphia (1)
- (Peru) Jaime Yzaga - Tampa, Sydney Indoors (2)

The following players won their first title:

- (United States) Chuck Adams
- (Spain) Alberto Berasategui
- (France) Arnaud Boetsch
- (Spain) Jordi Burillo
- (Germany) Marc-Kevin Goellner
- (United States) Todd Martin
- (Russia) Andrei Olhovskiy
- (Canada) Greg Rusedski
- (United States) Jonathan Stark
- (Australia) Jason Stoltenberg

== See also ==
- 1993 WTA Tour
