= 1993 Salem Open Hong Kong =

- Date: 12–18 April
- Edition: 18th
- Category: World Series
- Draw: 32S / 16D
- Prize money: $275,000
- Surface: Hard / outdoor
- Location: Hong Kong, Hong Kong

Champions

Singles
- (United States) Pete Sampras

Doubles
- (United States) David Wheaton / (Australia) Todd Woodbridge
← 1992 ·	Hong Kong Open	· 1994 →

The 1993 Salem Open Hong Kong was a men's tennis tournament played on outdoor hard courts on Hong Kong Island in Hong Kong that was part of the World Series of the 1993 ATP Tour. It was the 18th edition of the tournament and was held from 12 April through 18 April 1993. Second-seeded Pete Sampras won the singles title and earned $39,600 first-prize money.

== Finals ==
=== Singles ===
(United States) Pete Sampras defeated (United States) Jim Courier 6–3, 6–7^{(1–7)}, 7–6^{(7–2)}

- It was Sampras' 4th singles title of the year and the 17th of his career.

=== Doubles ===
(United States) David Wheaton / (Australia) Todd Woodbridge defeated (Australia) Sandon Stolle / (Australia) Jason Stoltenberg 6–1, 6–3

- It was Wheaton's only doubles title of the year and the 2nd of his career. It was Woodbridge's 3rd doubles title of the year and the 19th of his career.
