= 1993 Internazionali Cassa di Risparmio =

ATP tennis tournament in Bologna

- Date: 17–23 May
- Edition: 9th
- Category: World Series
- Draw: 32S / 16D
- Prize money: $275,000
- Surface: Clay / outdoor
- Location: Bologna, Italy
- Venue: Cierrebi Club

Champions

Singles
- (Spain) Jordi Burillo

Doubles
- (South Africa) Danie Visser / (Australia) Laurie Warder
← 1992 ·	Bologna Outdoor	· 1994 →

The 1993 Internazionali Cassa di Risparmio, also known as the Bologna Open, was a men's tennis tournament played on outdoor clay courts at the Cierrebi Club in Bologna in Italy and was part of the World Series of the 1993 ATP Tour. It was the ninth edition of the tournament and was held from 16 May until 23 May 1993. Unseeded Jordi Burillo, who entered the main draw as a qualifier, won the singles title.

== Finals ==
=== Singles ===
(Spain) Jordi Burillo defeated (Russia) Andrei Cherkasov 7–6^{(7–4)}, 6–7^{(7–9)}, 6–1

- It was Burillo's only singles title of his career.

=== Doubles ===
(South Africa) Danie Visser / (Australia) Laurie Warder defeated (United States) Luke Jensen / (United States) Murphy Jensen 4–6, 6–4, 6–4

- It was Visser's 2nd doubles title of the year and the 15th of his career. It was Warder's 3rd doubles title of the year and the 12th of his career.
