= 1993 Kroger St. Jude International =

Tennis tournament

- Date: February 8–14
- Edition: 23rd
- Category: Championship Series
- Draw: 48S / 24D
- Prize money: $655,000
- Surface: Hard / indoor
- Location: Memphis, Tennessee, US
- Venue: Racquet Club of Memphis

Champions

Singles
- (United States) Jim Courier

Doubles
- (Australia) Todd Woodbridge / (Australia) Mark Woodforde
- U.S. National Indoor Championships

The 1993 Kroger St. Jude International was a men's tennis tournament held at the Racquet Club of Memphis in Memphis, Tennessee in the United States. The event was part of the Championship Series of the 1993 ATP Tour. It was the 23rd edition of the tournament and was held from February 8 through February 14, 1993. First-seeded Jim Courier won the singles title.

== Finals ==
=== Singles ===
(United States) Jim Courier defeated (United States) Todd Martin 5–7, 7–6^{(7–4)}, 7–6^{(7–4)}

- It was Courier's 2nd singles title of the year, and the 11th of his career.

=== Doubles ===
(Australia) Todd Woodbridge / (Australia) Mark Woodforde defeated (Netherlands) Jacco Eltingh / (Netherlands) Paul Haarhuis 6–4, 4–6, 6–3
