= 1992 Lipton International Players Championships =

- Date: March 8–22
- Edition: 8th
- Surface: Hard / outdoor
- Location: Key Biscayne, Florida, U.S.
- Venue: Tennis Center at Crandon Park

Champions

Men's singles
- (United States) Michael Chang

Women's singles
- (Spain) Arantxa Sánchez Vicario

Men's doubles
- (United States) Ken Flach / (United States) Todd Witsken

Women's doubles
- (Spain) Arantxa Sánchez Vicario / (Latvia) Larisa Savchenko-Neiland
- Miami Open

The 1992 Lipton International Players Championships was a tennis tournament played on outdoor hard courts. It was the 8th edition of the Miami Masters, and was part of the ATP Super 9 of the 1992 ATP Tour, and of the Tier I Series of the 1992 WTA Tour. Both the men's and the women's events took place at the Tennis Center at Crandon Park in Key Biscayne, Florida in the United States, from through 1992.

The men's field was headlined by ATP No. 1, 1992 Australian Open, 1991 Tour Championships titlist, San Francisco, Brussels runner-up, Key Biscayne defending champion Jim Courier, Australian Open, Stuttgart finalist, former world no. 1 Stefan Edberg and Brussels, Rotterdam winner Boris Becker. Other top players in the field were Philadelphia titlist Pete Sampras, Milan finalist Goran Ivanišević, Michael Chang, Petr Korda and Emilio Sánchez.

The women's field was led by Monica Seles. Among other players competing were former champions Steffi Graf and Gabriela Sabatini. Also competing were Arantxa Sánchez Vicario, Jennifer Capriati and Mary Pierce.

== Finals ==
=== Men's singles ===
(United States) Michael Chang def. (Argentina) Alberto Mancini 7–5, 7–5

- It was Michael Chang's 3rd title of the year and his 8th overall. It was his 2nd Masters title of the year and his 3rd overall.

=== Women's singles ===
(Spain) Arantxa Sánchez Vicario defeated (Argentina) Gabriela Sabatini 6–1, 6–4

- It was Arantxa Sánchez Vicario's 1st title of the year and her 7th overall. It was her 1st career Tier I title. Sabatini had also been a finalist the previous year, losing to Monica Seles in straight sets.

=== Men's doubles ===
(United States) Ken Flach / (United States) Todd Witsken defeated (United States) Kent Kinnear / (United States) Sven Salumaa 6–4, 6–3

=== Women's doubles ===
(Spain) Arantxa Sánchez Vicario / (Latvia) Larisa Savchenko-Neiland defeated (Canada) Jill Hetherington / (United States) Kathy Rinaldi 7–5, 5–7, 6–3
