= 1993 Thriftway ATP Championships – Doubles =

Doubles
- 1993 Thriftway ATP Championships

Final
- Champions: (United States) Andre Agassi (Czech Republic) Petr Korda
- Runners-up: (Sweden) Stefan Edberg (Sweden) Henrik Holm
- Score: 7–6, 6–4

Details
- Draw: 28 (3WC/2Q)
- Seeds: 8

Events
Singles	Doubles
← 1992 ·	Cincinnati Masters	· 1994 →

Todd Woodbridge and Mark Woodforde were the defending champions, but Woodbridge did not compete this year. Woodforde teamed up with Jason Stoltenberg and lost in the first round to tournament winners Andre Agassi and Petr Korda.

Agassi and Korda, who entered the tournament as wild cards, won the title by defeating Stefan Edberg and Henrik Holm 7–6, 6–4 in the final.

== Seeds ==
The first four seeds received a bye to the second round.

1. (United States) Patrick McEnroe / (United States) Richey Reneberg (semifinals)
2. (Australia) John Fitzgerald / (Sweden) Anders Järryd (second round)
3. (Canada) Grant Connell / (United States) Patrick Galbraith (semifinals)
4. (Australia) Mark Kratzmann / (Australia) Wally Masur (second round)
5. (United States) Luke Jensen / (United States) Murphy Jensen (first round)
6. (United States) Jared Palmer / (United States) Jonathan Stark (quarterfinals)
7. (South Africa) Danie Visser / (Australia) Laurie Warder (first round)
8. (United States) Steve DeVries / (Australia) David Macpherson (first round)

== Draw ==
=== Key ===
- Q = Qualifier
- WC = Wild card
- LL = Lucky loser
- Alt = Alternate
- SE = Special exempt
- PR = Protected ranking
- ITF = ITF entry
- JE = Junior exempt
- w/o = Walkover
- r = Retired
- d = Defaulted
- SR = Special ranking

=== Finals ===
Semifinals
1	(United States) Patrick McEnroe (United States) Richey Reneberg	4	6	4
WC	(United States) Andre Agassi (Czech Republic) Petr Korda	6	2	6
3	(Canada) Grant Connell (United States) Patrick Galbraith	4	4
(Sweden) Stefan Edberg (Sweden) Henrik Holm	6	6

Final
WC	(United States) Andre Agassi (Czech Republic) Petr Korda	7	6
(Sweden) Stefan Edberg (Sweden) Henrik Holm	6	4

=== Top half ===
First round
(Sweden) R Bergh (South Africa) B Talbot	6	4	6
(South Africa) JL de Jager (The Bahamas) M Knowles	4	6	7
WC	(Switzerland) J Hlasek (Croatia) G Ivanišević	6	6	3
(United States) B Pearce (United States) D Randall	7	3	6
Q	(Canada) S Lareau (United States) A O'Brien	2	7	6
8	(United States) S DeVries (Australia) D Macpherson	6	6	2
(South Africa) S Kruger (United States) C Van Emburgh	5	4
(Canada) G Michibata (United States) D Pate	7	6
WC	(United States) A Agassi (Czech Republic) P Korda	6	3	6
(Australia) J Stoltenberg (Australia) M Woodforde	3	6	2
(South Africa) W Ferreira (Germany) M Stich	6	7
5	(United States) L Jensen (United States) M Jensen	3	5

Second round
1	(United States) P McEnroe (United States) R Reneberg	6	6	6
(South Africa) JL de Jager (The Bahamas) M Knowles	7	2	2
(United States) B Pearce (United States) D Randall	3	6	6
Q	(Canada) S Lareau (United States) A O'Brien	6	3	4
4	(Australia) M Kratzmann (Australia) W Masur	3	7	2
(Canada) G Michibata (United States) D Pate	6	6	6
WC	(United States) A Agassi (Czech Republic) P Korda	6	6
(South Africa) W Ferreira (Germany) M Stich	4	3

Quarterfinals
1	(United States) P McEnroe (United States) R Reneberg	6	6
(United States) B Pearce (United States) D Randall	4	0
(Canada) G Michibata (United States) D Pate	2	5
WC	(United States) A Agassi (Czech Republic) P Korda	6	7

Semifinals
1	(United States) P McEnroe (United States) R Reneberg	4	6	4
WC	(United States) A Agassi (Czech Republic) P Korda	6	2	6

=== Bottom half ===
First round
6	(United States) J Palmer (United States) J Stark	7	6
(United States) M Briggs (United States) K Jones	6	4
WC	(United States) P Annacone (United States) D Wheaton	6	6
(United States) S Davis (Netherlands) J Eltingh	4	2
(United States) K Flach (United States) R Leach	7	3	6
(South Africa) D Adams (Russia) A Olhovskiy	6	6	3
7	(South Africa) D Visser (Australia) L Warder	6	2
(Sweden) S Edberg (Sweden) H Holm	7	6
(South Africa) P Norval (Italy) D Nargiso	4	2
(United States) S Cannon (United States) S Melville	6	6
(Netherlands) J Siemerink (Australia) S Stolle	7	6
Q	(United States) T Nelson (India) L Paes	5	4

Second round
6	(United States) J Palmer (United States) J Stark	6	6	6
WC	(United States) P Annacone (United States) D Wheaton	4	7	4
(United States) K Flach (United States) R Leach	5	5
3	(Canada) G Connell (United States) P Galbraith	7	7
(Sweden) S Edberg (Sweden) H Holm	6	6	6
(United States) S Cannon (United States) S Melville	3	7	3
(Netherlands) J Siemerink (Australia) S Stolle	6	3	6
2	(Australia) J Fitzgerald (Sweden) A Järryd	2	6	4

Quarterfinals
6	(United States) J Palmer (United States) J Stark	4	6
3	(Canada) G Connell (United States) P Galbraith	6	7
(Sweden) S Edberg (Sweden) H Holm	6	6
(Netherlands) J Siemerink (Australia) S Stolle	4	4

Semifinals
3	(Canada) G Connell (United States) P Galbraith	4	4
(Sweden) S Edberg (Sweden) H Holm	6	6

== Qualifying ==
=== Qualifying seeds ===
1. (United Kingdom) Jeremy Bates / (United Kingdom) Neil Broad (first round)
2. (United States) Bryan Shelton / (United States) Todd Witsken (first round)
3. (South Africa) Royce Deppe / (United States) Bret Garnett (first round)
4. (United States) Kent Kinnear / (United States) Richard Schmidt (first round)

=== Qualifiers ===
1. (United States) Todd Nelson / (India) Leander Paes
2. (Canada) Sébastien Lareau / (United States) Alex O'Brien

=== Qualifying draw ===
==== First qualifier ====
First round					Qualifying competition
1	(United Kingdom) Jeremy Bates (United Kingdom) Neil Broad	3	7	5
WC	(South Africa) Johan de Beer (Zimbabwe) Kevin Ullyett	6	6	7	WC	(South Africa) Johan de Beer (Zimbabwe) Kevin Ullyett	6	7	3
	(United States) Todd Nelson (India) Leander Paes	6	6			(United States) Todd Nelson (India) Leander Paes	7	6	6
3	(South Africa) Royce Deppe (United States) Bret Garnett	4	4

==== Second qualifier ====
First round				Qualifying competition
2	(United States) Bryan Shelton (United States) Todd Witsken	2	2
	(Canada) Sébastien Lareau (United States) Alex O'Brien	6	6	(Canada) Sébastien Lareau (United States) Alex O'Brien	4	6	6
	(Brazil) Luiz Mattar (Norway) Bent-Ove Pedersen	6	6	(Brazil) Luiz Mattar (Norway) Bent-Ove Pedersen	6	4	4
4	(United States) Kent Kinnear (United States) Richard Schmidt	4	3
