= 1990 ATP Tour =

Men's tennis circuit

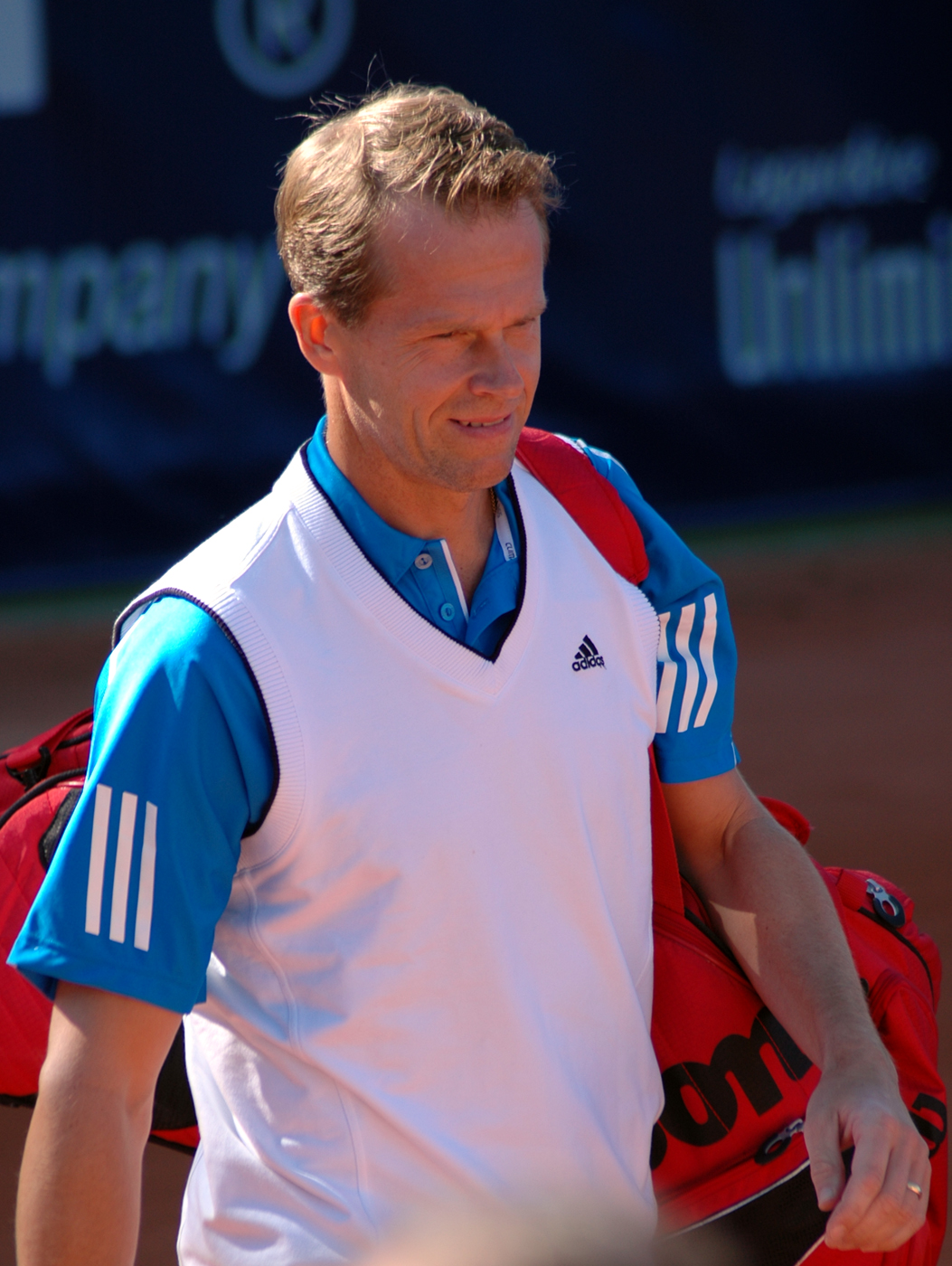
- Stefan Edberg finished the year ranked world No. 1 for the first time in his career. He won seven titles during the season, including a major at the Wimbledon Championships. He also won three ATP Championship Series, Single Week events, and finished runner-up at another major, the Australian Open.

Details
- Duration: January 1, 1990 – November 19, 1990
- Edition: 1st
- Tournaments: 80
- Categories: Grand Slam (4); ATP Tour World Championships; Grand Slam Cup; ATP Championship Series, Single-Week (9); ATP Championship Series (12); ATP World Series (53)

Achievements (singles)
- Most titles: (Sweden) Stefan Edberg (7)
- Most finals: (Sweden) Stefan Edberg (12)
- Prize money leader: (United States) Pete Sampras ($2,875,406)
- Points leader: (Sweden) Stefan Edberg (3889)

Awards
- Player of the year: (Sweden) Stefan Edberg
- Doubles team of the year: (South Africa) Pieter Aldrich; (South Africa) Danie Visser
- Most improved player of the year: (United States) Pete Sampras
- Newcomer of the year: (France) Fabrice Santoro
- Comeback player of the year: (Austria) Thomas Muster

The 1990 IBM ATP Tour was the first season of the ATP Tour, the newly formed single world tennis circuit which came in replacing the two dual tours the ITF Grand Prix Circuit and WCT Circuit. It was the elite tour for professional tennis organized by the Association of Tennis Professionals. In 1990 the IBM ATP Tour included the four Grand Slam tournaments (organized by the International Tennis Federation (ITF)), the ATP Tour World Championships, the ATP Championship Series, Single-Week, the ATP Championship Series and the ATP World Series. The World Team Cup, Davis Cup (organized by the ITF) and Grand Slam Cup (organized by the ITF) are included in this calendar but did not count towards the Tour.

== Schedule ==
This is the complete schedule of events on the 1990 IBM ATP Tour, with player progression documented from the quarterfinals stage.

Key

Grand Slam
ATP Tour World Championships
ATP Championship Series, Single-Week
ATP Championship Series
ATP World Series
Team Events

=== January ===
| Week | Tournament | Champions | Runners-up | Semifinalists | Quarterfinalists |
|---|---|---|---|---|---|
| 26 Dec 1989 | Hopman Cup; Perth, Australia; ITF Mixed Team Championships; Hard (i) – 8 teams (RR) | Spain; 2–1 | United States | Australia; Czechoslovakia | Italy; Soviet Union; France; Austria |
| 1 Jan | Australian Men's Hardcourt Championships; Adelaide, Australia; ATP World Series; Hard – $125,000 – 32S/16D; Singles – Doubles | (Austria) Thomas Muster; 3–6, 6–2, 7–5 | (United States) Jimmy Arias | (Spain) Sergi Bruguera (France) Jean-Philippe Fleurian | (West Germany) Michael Stich (Australia) Mark Kratzmann (Netherlands) Mark Koevermans (France) Jérôme Potier |
| 1 Jan | Australian Men's Hardcourt Championships; Adelaide, Australia; ATP World Series; Hard – $125,000 – 32S/16D; Singles – Doubles | (United Kingdom) Andrew Castle (Nigeria) Nduka Odizor; 7–6, 6–2 | (West Germany) Alexander Mronz (Netherlands) Michiel Schapers | (Spain) Sergi Bruguera (France) Jean-Philippe Fleurian | (West Germany) Michael Stich (Australia) Mark Kratzmann (Netherlands) Mark Koevermans (France) Jérôme Potier |
| 1 Jan | BP National Championships; Wellington, New Zealand; ATP World Series; Hard – $125,000 – 32S/16D; Singles – Doubles | (Spain) Emilio Sánchez; 6–7^{(3–7)}, 6–4, 4–6, 6–4, 6–1 | (United States) Richey Reneberg | (Italy) Paolo Canè (Czechoslovakia) Karel Nováček | (Australia) Richard Fromberg (Israel) Gilad Bloom (Sweden) Lars-Anders Wahlgren (Soviet Union) Andrei Chesnokov |
| 1 Jan | BP National Championships; Wellington, New Zealand; ATP World Series; Hard – $125,000 – 32S/16D; Singles – Doubles | (New Zealand) Kelly Evernden (Venezuela) Nicolás Pereira; 6–4, 7–6 | (Spain) Sergio Casal (Spain) Emilio Sánchez | (Italy) Paolo Canè (Czechoslovakia) Karel Nováček | (Australia) Richard Fromberg (Israel) Gilad Bloom (Sweden) Lars-Anders Wahlgren (Soviet Union) Andrei Chesnokov |
| 8 Jan | Holden NSW Open; Sydney, Australia; ATP World Series; Hard – $150,000 – 32S/16D; Singles – Doubles | (France) Yannick Noah; 5–7, 6–3, 6–4 | (Germany) Carl-Uwe Steeb | (United States) Aaron Krickstein (Sweden) Mats Wilander | (Czechoslovakia) Ivan Lendl (United States) David Wheaton (United States) Pete Sampras (West Germany) Boris Becker |
| 8 Jan | Holden NSW Open; Sydney, Australia; ATP World Series; Hard – $150,000 – 32S/16D; Singles – Doubles | (Australia) Pat Cash (Australia) Mark Kratzmann; 6–4, 7–5 | (South Africa) Pieter Aldrich (South Africa) Danie Visser | (United States) Aaron Krickstein (Sweden) Mats Wilander | (Czechoslovakia) Ivan Lendl (United States) David Wheaton (United States) Pete Sampras (West Germany) Boris Becker |
| 8 Jan | Benson & Hedges Open; Auckland, New Zealand; ATP World Series; Hard – $125,000 – 32S/16D; Singles – Doubles | (United States) Scott Davis; 4–6, 6–3, 6–3 | (Soviet Union) Andrei Chesnokov | (Israel) Amos Mansdorf (India) Ramesh Krishnan | (Canada) Grant Connell (United States) Jimmy Arias (Sweden) Magnus Gustafsson (New Zealand) Steve Guy |
| 8 Jan | Benson & Hedges Open; Auckland, New Zealand; ATP World Series; Hard – $125,000 – 32S/16D; Singles – Doubles | (United States) Kelly Jones (United States) Robert Van't Hof; 7–6, 6–0 | (Israel) Gilad Bloom (Netherlands) Paul Haarhuis | (Israel) Amos Mansdorf (India) Ramesh Krishnan | (Canada) Grant Connell (United States) Jimmy Arias (Sweden) Magnus Gustafsson (New Zealand) Steve Guy |
| 15 Jan; 22 Jan | Australian Open; Melbourne, Australia; Grand Slam; Hard – $1,462,000 – 128S/116Q/64D/32XD; Singles – Doubles – Mixed doubles | (Czechoslovakia) Ivan Lendl; 4–6, 7–6^{(7–3)}, 5–2 ret. | (Sweden) Stefan Edberg | (France) Yannick Noah (Sweden) Mats Wilander | (Soviet Union) Andrei Cherkasov (Sweden) Mikael Pernfors (United States) David Wheaton (West Germany) Boris Becker |
| 15 Jan; 22 Jan | Australian Open; Melbourne, Australia; Grand Slam; Hard – $1,462,000 – 128S/116Q/64D/32XD; Singles – Doubles – Mixed doubles | (South Africa) Pieter Aldrich (South Africa) Danie Visser; 6–4, 4–6, 6–1, 6–4 | (Canada) Grant Connell (Canada) Glenn Michibata | (France) Yannick Noah (Sweden) Mats Wilander | (Soviet Union) Andrei Cherkasov (Sweden) Mikael Pernfors (United States) David Wheaton (West Germany) Boris Becker |
| 15 Jan; 22 Jan | Australian Open; Melbourne, Australia; Grand Slam; Hard – $1,462,000 – 128S/116Q/64D/32XD; Singles – Doubles – Mixed doubles | (Soviet Union) Natasha Zvereva (United States) Jim Pugh; 4–6, 6–2, 6–3 | (United States) Zina Garrison (United States) Rick Leach | (France) Yannick Noah (Sweden) Mats Wilander | (Soviet Union) Andrei Cherkasov (Sweden) Mikael Pernfors (United States) David Wheaton (West Germany) Boris Becker |
| 29 Jan | Davis Cup by NEC First round Bremen, West Germany – carpet Buenos Aires, Argentina – clay Christchurch, New Zealand – grass Perth, Australia – grass Prague, Czechoslovakia – carpet Carlsbad, California, US – hard Barcelona, Spain – clay Cagliari, Italy – clay | First round winners West Germany 3–2; Argentina 3–0; New Zealand 3–2; Australia 3–2; Czechoslovakia 5–0; United States 4–0; Austria 3–2; Italy 3–2 | First round losers Netherlands; Israel; Yugoslavia; France; Switzerland; Mexico; Spain; Sweden | | |

=== February ===
| Week | Tournament | Champions | Runners-up | Semifinalists | Quarterfinalists |
|---|---|---|---|---|---|
| 5 Feb | Stella Artois Indoor; Milan, Italy; ATP World Series; Carpet (i) – $540,000 – 32S/16D; Singles – Doubles | (Czechoslovakia) Ivan Lendl; 6–3, 6–2 | (United States) Tim Mayotte | (United States) Pete Sampras (United States) John McEnroe | (United States) Jim Courier (Czechoslovakia) Milan Šrejber (Switzerland) Jakob Hlasek (West Germany) Eric Jelen |
| 5 Feb | Stella Artois Indoor; Milan, Italy; ATP World Series; Carpet (i) – $540,000 – 32S/16D; Singles – Doubles | (Italy) Omar Camporese (Italy) Diego Nargiso; 6–4, 6–4 | (Netherlands) Tom Nijssen (West Germany) Udo Riglewski | (United States) Pete Sampras (United States) John McEnroe | (United States) Jim Courier (Czechoslovakia) Milan Šrejber (Switzerland) Jakob Hlasek (West Germany) Eric Jelen |
| 5 Feb | Volvo San Francisco; San Francisco, CA, US; ATP World Series; Carpet (i) – $225,000 – 32S/16D; Singles – Doubles | (United States) Andre Agassi; 6–1, 6–3 | (United States) Todd Witsken | (United States) Joey Rive (United States) Jim Grabb | (United States) Richey Reneberg (United States) Jimmy Arias (South Africa) Christo van Rensburg (United States) Paul Annacone |
| 5 Feb | Volvo San Francisco; San Francisco, CA, US; ATP World Series; Carpet (i) – $225,000 – 32S/16D; Singles – Doubles | (United States) Kelly Jones (United States) Robert Van't Hof; 2–6, 7–6, 6–3 | (United States) Glenn Layendecker (United States) Richey Reneberg | (United States) Joey Rive (United States) Jim Grabb | (United States) Richey Reneberg (United States) Jimmy Arias (South Africa) Christo van Rensburg (United States) Paul Annacone |
| 5 Feb | Chevrolet Classic; Guarujá, Brazil; ATP World Series; Hard – $125,000 – 32S/16D; Singles – Doubles | (Argentina) Martín Jaite; 3–6, 6–4, 6–3 | (Brazil) Luiz Mattar | (Argentina) Eduardo Bengoechea (Brazil) Alexandre Hocevar | (United States) Jay Berger (Brazil) Ivan Kley (Brazil) Cássio Motta (West Germany) Pavel Vojtíšek |
| 5 Feb | Chevrolet Classic; Guarujá, Brazil; ATP World Series; Hard – $125,000 – 32S/16D; Singles – Doubles | (Argentina) Javier Frana (Argentina) Gustavo Luza; 7–6, 7–6 | (Brazil) Luiz Mattar (Brazil) Cássio Motta | (Argentina) Eduardo Bengoechea (Brazil) Alexandre Hocevar | (United States) Jay Berger (Brazil) Ivan Kley (Brazil) Cássio Motta (West Germany) Pavel Vojtíšek |
| 12 Feb | SkyDome World Tennis Tournament; Toronto, Ontario, Canada; ATP Championship Series; Carpet (i) – $1,005,000 – 56S/28D; Singles – Doubles | (Czechoslovakia) Ivan Lendl; 6–3, 6–0 | (United States) Tim Mayotte | (United States) John McEnroe (United States) Brad Gilbert | (United States) Kevin Curren (United States) Jay Berger (United States) Aaron Krickstein (Czechoslovakia) Petr Korda |
| 12 Feb | SkyDome World Tennis Tournament; Toronto, Ontario, Canada; ATP Championship Series; Carpet (i) – $1,005,000 – 56S/28D; Singles – Doubles | (United States) Patrick Galbraith (Australia) David Macpherson; 3–6, 6–3, 6–4 | (South Africa) Neil Broad (United States) Kevin Curren | (United States) John McEnroe (United States) Brad Gilbert | (United States) Kevin Curren (United States) Jay Berger (United States) Aaron Krickstein (Czechoslovakia) Petr Korda |
| 12 Feb | Belgian Indoor Championships; Brussels, Belgium; ATP Championship Series; Carpet (i) – $465,000 – 32S/16D; Singles – Doubles | (West Germany) Boris Becker; 7–5, 6–2, 6–2 | (West Germany) Carl-Uwe Steeb | (Sweden) Magnus Gustafsson (Czechoslovakia) Miloslav Mečíř | (Italy) Paolo Canè (Sweden) Jonas Svensson (Haiti) Ronald Agénor (Socialist Federal Republic of Yugoslavia) Goran Ivanišević |
| 12 Feb | Belgian Indoor Championships; Brussels, Belgium; ATP Championship Series; Carpet (i) – $465,000 – 32S/16D; Singles – Doubles | (Spain) Emilio Sánchez (Socialist Federal Republic of Yugoslavia) Slobodan Živojinović; 7–5, 6–3 | (Socialist Federal Republic of Yugoslavia) Goran Ivanišević (Hungary) Balázs Taróczy | (Sweden) Magnus Gustafsson (Czechoslovakia) Miloslav Mečíř | (Italy) Paolo Canè (Sweden) Jonas Svensson (Haiti) Ronald Agénor (Socialist Federal Republic of Yugoslavia) Goran Ivanišević |
| 19 Feb | Ebel U.S. Pro Indoor; Philadelphia, PA, US; ATP Championship Series; Carpet (i) – $825,000 – 48S/24D; Singles – Doubles | (United States) Pete Sampras; 7–6^{(7–4)}, 7–5, 6–2 | (Ecuador) Andrés Gómez | (Australia) Mark Kratzmann (Czechoslovakia) Petr Korda | (United States) Jim Courier (United States) Tim Mayotte (United States) Jay Berger (Netherlands) Paul Haarhuis |
| 19 Feb | Ebel U.S. Pro Indoor; Philadelphia, PA, US; ATP Championship Series; Carpet (i) – $825,000 – 48S/24D; Singles – Doubles | (United States) Rick Leach (United States) Jim Pugh; 6–4, 6–2 | (Canada) Grant Connell (Canada) Glenn Michibata | (Australia) Mark Kratzmann (Czechoslovakia) Petr Korda | (United States) Jim Courier (United States) Tim Mayotte (United States) Jay Berger (Netherlands) Paul Haarhuis |
| 19 Feb | Eurocard Classics; Stuttgart, West Germany; ATP Championship Series; Carpet (i) – $825,000 – 32S/16D; Singles – Doubles | (West Germany) Boris Becker; 6–2, 6–2 | (Czechoslovakia) Ivan Lendl | (Sweden) Magnus Gustafsson (Sweden) Jonas Svensson | (West Germany) Patrik Kühnen (Finland) Aki Rahunen (Austria) Horst Skoff (Czechoslovakia) Miloslav Mečíř |
| 19 Feb | Eurocard Classics; Stuttgart, West Germany; ATP Championship Series; Carpet (i) – $825,000 – 32S/16D; Singles – Doubles | (France) Guy Forget (Switzerland) Jakob Hlasek; 6–3, 6–2 | (Denmark) Michael Mortensen (Netherlands) Tom Nijssen | (Sweden) Magnus Gustafsson (Sweden) Jonas Svensson | (West Germany) Patrik Kühnen (Finland) Aki Rahunen (Austria) Horst Skoff (Czechoslovakia) Miloslav Mečíř |
| 26 Feb | ABN World Tennis Tournament; Rotterdam, Netherlands; ATP World Series; Carpet (i) – $450,000 – 32S/16D; Singles – Doubles | (United States) Brad Gilbert; 6–1, 6–3 | (Sweden) Jonas Svensson | (Denmark) Michael Tauson (Switzerland) Jakob Hlasek | (Israel) Amos Mansdorf (Sweden) Magnus Gustafsson (Austria) Alex Antonitsch (Sweden) Thomas Högstedt |
| 26 Feb | ABN World Tennis Tournament; Rotterdam, Netherlands; ATP World Series; Carpet (i) – $450,000 – 32S/16D; Singles – Doubles | (Mexico) Leonardo Lavalle (Mexico) Jorge Lozano; 6–3, 7–6 | (Italy) Diego Nargiso (Venezuela) Nicolás Pereira | (Denmark) Michael Tauson (Switzerland) Jakob Hlasek | (Israel) Amos Mansdorf (Sweden) Magnus Gustafsson (Austria) Alex Antonitsch (Sweden) Thomas Högstedt |
| 26 Feb | Volvo U.S. National Indoor; Memphis, Tennessee, US; ATP World Series; Hard (i) – $225,000 – 48S/24D; Singles – Doubles | (West Germany) Michael Stich; 6–7^{(5–7)}, 6–4, 7–6^{(7–1)} | (Australia) Wally Masur | (South Africa) Gary Muller (United States) Glenn Layendecker | (South Africa) Danie Visser (United States) MaliVai Washington (Czechoslovakia) Petr Korda (Finland) Veli Paloheimo |
| 26 Feb | Volvo U.S. National Indoor; Memphis, Tennessee, US; ATP World Series; Hard (i) – $225,000 – 48S/24D; Singles – Doubles | (Australia) Darren Cahill (Australia) Mark Kratzmann; 6–3, 6–2 | (West Germany) Udo Riglewski (West Germany) Michael Stich | (South Africa) Gary Muller (United States) Glenn Layendecker | (South Africa) Danie Visser (United States) MaliVai Washington (Czechoslovakia) Petr Korda (Finland) Veli Paloheimo |

=== March ===
| Week | Tournament | Champions | Runners-up | Semifinalists | Quarterfinalists |
|---|---|---|---|---|---|
| 5 Mar | Newsweek Champions Cup; Indian Wells, California, US; ATP Championship Series, Single-Week; Hard – $750,000 – 56S/28D; Singles – Doubles | (Sweden) Stefan Edberg; 6–4, 5–7, 7–6^{(7–1)}, 7–6^{(8–6)} | (United States) Andre Agassi | (West Germany) Boris Becker (United States) Jim Courier | (United States) Jay Berger (Spain) Emilio Sánchez (United States) Aaron Krickstein (Sweden) Jan Gunnarsson |
| 5 Mar | Newsweek Champions Cup; Indian Wells, California, US; ATP Championship Series, Single-Week; Hard – $750,000 – 56S/28D; Singles – Doubles | (West Germany) Boris Becker (France) Guy Forget; 6–4, 6–3 | (United States) Jim Grabb (United States) Patrick McEnroe | (West Germany) Boris Becker (United States) Jim Courier | (United States) Jay Berger (Spain) Emilio Sánchez (United States) Aaron Krickstein (Sweden) Jan Gunnarsson |
| 5 Mar | Trophée Hassan II; Casablanca, Morocco; ATP World Series; Clay – $125,000 – 32S/16D; Singles – Doubles | (Austria) Thomas Muster; 6–1, 6–7^{(3–7)}, 6–2 | (Argentina) Guillermo Pérez Roldán | (Spain) Tomás Carbonell (Socialist Federal Republic of Yugoslavia) Goran Prpić | (France) Thierry Tulasne (Argentina) Roberto Azar (Australia) Johan Anderson (Netherlands) Mark Koevermans |
| 5 Mar | Trophée Hassan II; Casablanca, Morocco; ATP World Series; Clay – $125,000 – 32S/16D; Singles – Doubles | (Australia) Todd Woodbridge (Australia) Simon Youl; 6–3, 6–1 | (Netherlands) Paul Haarhuis (Netherlands) Mark Koevermans | (Spain) Tomás Carbonell (Socialist Federal Republic of Yugoslavia) Goran Prpić | (France) Thierry Tulasne (Argentina) Roberto Azar (Australia) Johan Anderson (Netherlands) Mark Koevermans |
| 12 Mar; 19 Mar | Lipton International Players Championships; Key Biscayne, Florida, US; ATP Championship Series, Single-Week; Hard – $1,200,000 – 96S/48D; Singles – Doubles | (United States) Andre Agassi; 6–1, 6–4, 0–6, 6–2 | (Sweden) Stefan Edberg | (Spain) Emilio Sánchez (United States) Jay Berger | (Argentina) Martín Jaite (Switzerland) Jakob Hlasek (United States) Jim Courier (United States) Pete Sampras |
| 12 Mar; 19 Mar | Lipton International Players Championships; Key Biscayne, Florida, US; ATP Championship Series, Single-Week; Hard – $1,200,000 – 96S/48D; Singles – Doubles | (United States) Rick Leach (United States) Jim Pugh; 6–7, 6–4, 6–2 | (West Germany) Boris Becker (Brazil) Cássio Motta | (Spain) Emilio Sánchez (United States) Jay Berger | (Argentina) Martín Jaite (Switzerland) Jakob Hlasek (United States) Jim Courier (United States) Pete Sampras |
| 26 Mar | Davis Cup by NEC Quarterfinals; Buenos Aires, Argentina – clay Brisbane, Australia – grass Prague, Czechoslovakia – carpet Vienna, Austria – clay (i) | Quarterfinal winners Argentina 3–2; Australia 3–2; United States 4–1; Austria 5–0 | Quarterfinal losers West Germany; New Zealand; Czechoslovakia; Italy | | |

=== April ===
| Week | Tournament | Champions | Runners-up | Semifinalists | Quarterfinalists |
|---|---|---|---|---|---|
| 2 Apr | Estoril Open; Oeiras, Portugal; ATP World Series; Clay – $225,000 – 32S/16D; Singles – Doubles | (Spain) Emilio Sánchez; 6–3, 6–1 | (Argentina) Franco Davín | (Spain) Jordi Arrese (Spain) Juan Aguilera | (United States) Jay Berger (Italy) Omar Camporese (Austria) Thomas Muster (Netherlands) Paul Haarhuis |
| 2 Apr | Estoril Open; Oeiras, Portugal; ATP World Series; Clay – $225,000 – 32S/16D; Singles – Doubles | (Spain) Sergio Casal (Spain) Emilio Sánchez; 7–5, 4–6, 7–5 | (Italy) Omar Camporese (Italy) Paolo Canè | (Spain) Jordi Arrese (Spain) Juan Aguilera | (United States) Jay Berger (Italy) Omar Camporese (Austria) Thomas Muster (Netherlands) Paul Haarhuis |
| 2 Apr | Prudential-Bache Securities Classic; Orlando, Florida, US; ATP World Series; Hard – $225,000 – 32S/16D; Singles – Doubles | (United States) Brad Gilbert; 6–2, 6–1 | (South Africa) Christo van Rensburg | (United States) MaliVai Washington (United States) David Pate | (United States) Joey Rive (United States) Scott Davis (Australia) Jason Stoltenberg (United States) Alexis Hombrecher |
| 2 Apr | Prudential-Bache Securities Classic; Orlando, Florida, US; ATP World Series; Hard – $225,000 – 32S/16D; Singles – Doubles | (United States) Scott Davis (United States) David Pate; 6–3, 7–5 | (Venezuela) Alfonso Mora (United States) Brian Page | (United States) MaliVai Washington (United States) David Pate | (United States) Joey Rive (United States) Scott Davis (Australia) Jason Stoltenberg (United States) Alexis Hombrecher |
| 2 Apr | Banespa Open; Rio de Janeiro, Brazil; ATP World Series; Carpet – $225,000 – 32S/16D; Singles – Doubles | (Brazil) Luiz Mattar; 6–4, 6–4 | (Canada) Andrew Sznajder | (Canada) Martin Wostenholme (United States) Brian Garrow | (West Germany) Pavel Vojtíšek (Italy) Simone Colombo (Canada) Martin Laurendeau (West Germany) Patrick Baur |
| 2 Apr | Banespa Open; Rio de Janeiro, Brazil; ATP World Series; Carpet – $225,000 – 32S/16D; Singles – Doubles | (United States) Brian Garrow (United States) Sven Salumaa; 7–5, 6–3 | (Brazil) Nelson Aerts (Brazil) Fernando Roese | (Canada) Martin Wostenholme (United States) Brian Garrow | (West Germany) Pavel Vojtíšek (Italy) Simone Colombo (Canada) Martin Laurendeau (West Germany) Patrick Baur |
| 9 Apr | Suntory Japan Open Championships; Tokyo, Japan; ATP Championship Series; Hard – $825,000 – 56S/28D | (Sweden) Stefan Edberg; 6–4, 7–5 | (United States) Aaron Krickstein | (Czechoslovakia) Ivan Lendl (United States) Brad Gilbert | (Israel) Amos Mansdorf (United States) Michael Chang (Australia) Wally Masur (United States) Jim Grabb |
| 9 Apr | Suntory Japan Open Championships; Tokyo, Japan; ATP Championship Series; Hard – $825,000 – 56S/28D | (Australia) Mark Kratzmann (Australia) Wally Masur; 6–4, 6–3 | (United States) Kent Kinnear (United States) Brad Pearce | (Czechoslovakia) Ivan Lendl (United States) Brad Gilbert | (Israel) Amos Mansdorf (United States) Michael Chang (Australia) Wally Masur (United States) Jim Grabb |
| 9 Apr | Trofeo Conde de Godó; Barcelona, Spain; ATP Championship Series; Clay – $375,000 – 56S/28D | (Ecuador) Andrés Gómez; 6–0, 7–6^{(7–1)}, 3–6, 0–6, 6–2 | (Argentina) Guillermo Pérez Roldán | (Soviet Union) Andrei Chesnokov (Spain) Emilio Sánchez | (United States) Jay Berger (Uruguay) Diego Pérez (Spain) Sergi Bruguera (Argentina) Martín Jaite |
| 9 Apr | Trofeo Conde de Godó; Barcelona, Spain; ATP Championship Series; Clay – $375,000 – 56S/28D | (Ecuador) Andrés Gómez (Spain) Javier Sánchez; 7–5, 7–6 | (Spain) Sergio Casal (Spain) Emilio Sánchez | (Soviet Union) Andrei Chesnokov (Spain) Emilio Sánchez | (United States) Jay Berger (Uruguay) Diego Pérez (Spain) Sergi Bruguera (Argentina) Martín Jaite |
| 16 Apr | Philips Open; Nice, France; ATP World Series; Clay – $225,000 – 32S/16D; Singles – Doubles | (Spain) Juan Aguilera; 2–6, 6–3, 6–4 | (France) Guy Forget | (Soviet Union) Andrei Cherkasov (Switzerland) Marc Rosset | (United States) Jay Berger (Socialist Federal Republic of Yugoslavia) Goran Prpić (France) Fabrice Santoro (Switzerland) Jakob Hlasek |
| 16 Apr | Philips Open; Nice, France; ATP World Series; Clay – $225,000 – 32S/16D; Singles – Doubles | (Argentina) Alberto Mancini (France) Yannick Noah; 6–4, 7–6 | (Uruguay) Marcelo Filippini (Austria) Horst Skoff | (Soviet Union) Andrei Cherkasov (Switzerland) Marc Rosset | (United States) Jay Berger (Socialist Federal Republic of Yugoslavia) Goran Prpić (France) Fabrice Santoro (Switzerland) Jakob Hlasek |
| 16 Apr | KAL Cup Korea Open; Seoul, South Korea; ATP World Series; Hard – $140,000 – 32S/16D; Singles – Doubles | (Austria) Alex Antonitsch; 7–6, 6–3 | (Australia) Pat Cash | (Israel) Gilad Bloom (United States) Dan Goldie | (United States) Richard Matuszewski (Czechoslovakia) Milan Šrejber (Japan) Shuzo Matsuoka (West Germany) Patrik Kühnen |
| 16 Apr | KAL Cup Korea Open; Seoul, South Korea; ATP World Series; Hard – $140,000 – 32S/16D; Singles – Doubles | (Canada) Grant Connell (Canada) Glenn Michibata; 7–6, 6–4 | (Australia) Jason Stoltenberg (Australia) Todd Woodbridge | (Israel) Gilad Bloom (United States) Dan Goldie | (United States) Richard Matuszewski (Czechoslovakia) Milan Šrejber (Japan) Shuzo Matsuoka (West Germany) Patrik Kühnen |
| 23 Apr | Monte Carlo Open; Roquebrune-Cap-Martin, France; ATP Championship Series, Single-Week; Clay – $750,000 – 56S/28D; Singles – Doubles | (Soviet Union) Andrei Chesnokov; 7–5, 6–3, 6–3 | (Austria) Thomas Muster | (France) Henri Leconte (Spain) Emilio Sánchez | (Spain) Juan Aguilera (Austria) Horst Skoff (Switzerland) Marc Rosset (West Germany) Boris Becker |
| 23 Apr | Monte Carlo Open; Roquebrune-Cap-Martin, France; ATP Championship Series, Single-Week; Clay – $750,000 – 56S/28D; Singles – Doubles | (Czechoslovakia) Petr Korda (Czechoslovakia) Tomáš Šmíd; 6–2, 6–1 | (Ecuador) Andrés Gómez (Spain) Javier Sánchez | (France) Henri Leconte (Spain) Emilio Sánchez | (Spain) Juan Aguilera (Austria) Horst Skoff (Switzerland) Marc Rosset (West Germany) Boris Becker |
| 23 Apr | Salem Hong Kong Open; Hong Kong, Hong Kong; ATP World Series $185,000 – Hard – 32S/16D | (Australia) Pat Cash; 6–3, 6–4 | (Austria) Alex Antonitsch | (United States) Jonathan Canter (West Germany) Patrik Kühnen | (Netherlands) Tom Nijssen (United States) Patrick McEnroe (United States) Brad Pearce (Canada) Grant Connell |
| 23 Apr | Salem Hong Kong Open; Hong Kong, Hong Kong; ATP World Series $185,000 – Hard – 32S/16D | (Australia) Pat Cash (Australia) Wally Masur; 6–3, 6–3 | (United States) Kevin Curren (United States) Joey Rive | (United States) Jonathan Canter (West Germany) Patrik Kühnen | (Netherlands) Tom Nijssen (United States) Patrick McEnroe (United States) Brad Pearce (Canada) Grant Connell |
| 30 Apr | Madrid Grand Prix; Madrid, Spain; ATP World Series; Clay – $279,000 – 32S/16D | (Ecuador) Andrés Gómez; 6–3, 7–6^{(7–3)} | (Switzerland) Marc Rosset | (Spain) Javier Sánchez (Argentina) Martín Jaite | (Spain) Juan Carlos Báguena (Spain) Marcos Aurelio Gorriz (Argentina) Alberto Mancini (Netherlands) Mark Koevermans |
| 30 Apr | Madrid Grand Prix; Madrid, Spain; ATP World Series; Clay – $279,000 – 32S/16D | (Spain) Juan Carlos Báguena (Italy) Omar Camporese; 6–4, 3–6, 6–3 | (Ecuador) Andrés Gómez (Spain) Javier Sánchez | (Spain) Javier Sánchez (Argentina) Martín Jaite | (Spain) Juan Carlos Báguena (Spain) Marcos Aurelio Gorriz (Argentina) Alberto Mancini (Netherlands) Mark Koevermans |
| 30 Apr | BMW Open; Munich, West Germany; ATP World Series; Clay – $225,000 – 32S/16D; Singles – Doubles | (Czechoslovakia) Karel Nováček; 6–4, 6–2 | (Austria) Thomas Muster | (Czechoslovakia) Petr Korda (Sweden) Jonas Svensson | (Czechoslovakia) Martin Střelba (West Germany) Jens Wöhrmann (United States) Jim Courier (Sweden) Christian Bergström |
| 30 Apr | BMW Open; Munich, West Germany; ATP World Series; Clay – $225,000 – 32S/16D; Singles – Doubles | (West Germany) Udo Riglewski (West Germany) Michael Stich; 6–1, 6–4 | (Czechoslovakia) Petr Korda (Czechoslovakia) Tomáš Šmíd | (Czechoslovakia) Petr Korda (Sweden) Jonas Svensson | (Czechoslovakia) Martin Střelba (West Germany) Jens Wöhrmann (United States) Jim Courier (Sweden) Christian Bergström |
| 30 Apr | Epson Singapore Super Tennis; Singapore, Singapore; ATP World Series; Hard – $225,000 – 32S/16D | (United States) Kelly Jones; 6–4, 2–6, 7–6^{(7–4)} | (Australia) Richard Fromberg | (Netherlands) Jan Siemerink (United States) Dan Goldie | (Australia) Wally Masur (United States) Patrick McEnroe (New Zealand) Kelly Evernden (Sweden) Thomas Högstedt |
| 30 Apr | Epson Singapore Super Tennis; Singapore, Singapore; ATP World Series; Hard – $225,000 – 32S/16D | (Australia) Mark Kratzmann (Australia) Jason Stoltenberg; 6–1, 6–0 | (Australia) Brad Drewett (Australia) Todd Woodbridge | (Netherlands) Jan Siemerink (United States) Dan Goldie | (Australia) Wally Masur (United States) Patrick McEnroe (New Zealand) Kelly Evernden (Sweden) Thomas Högstedt |

=== May ===
| Week | Tournament | Champions | Runners-up | Semifinalists | Quarterfinalists |
|---|---|---|---|---|---|
| 7 May | German Open; Hamburg, West Germany; ATP Championship Series, Single-Week; Clay – $750,000 – 56S/28D; Singles – Doubles | (Spain) Juan Aguilera; 6–1, 6–0, 7–6^{(9–7)} | (West Germany) Boris Becker | (France) Henri Leconte (France) Guy Forget | (United States) Jimmy Arias (Argentina) Franco Davín (United States) Jay Berger (Sweden) Magnus Gustafsson |
| 7 May | German Open; Hamburg, West Germany; ATP Championship Series, Single-Week; Clay – $750,000 – 56S/28D; Singles – Doubles | (Spain) Sergi Bruguera (United States) Jim Courier; 4–6, 6–1, 7–6 | (West Germany) Udo Riglewski (West Germany) Michael Stich | (France) Henri Leconte (France) Guy Forget | (United States) Jimmy Arias (Argentina) Franco Davín (United States) Jay Berger (Sweden) Magnus Gustafsson |
| 7 May | U.S. Men's Clay Court Championships; Kiawah Island, SC, US; ATP World Series; Clay – $197,000 – 32S/16D; Singles – Doubles | (United States) David Wheaton; 6–4, 6–4 | (South Africa) Mark Kaplan | (West Germany) Alexander Mronz (United States) MaliVai Washington | (United States) Derrick Rostagno (United States) Jeff Tarango (United States) Tim Wilkison (Canada) Martin Wostenholme |
| 7 May | U.S. Men's Clay Court Championships; Kiawah Island, SC, US; ATP World Series; Clay – $197,000 – 32S/16D; Singles – Doubles | (United States) Scott Davis (United States) David Pate; 6–2, 6–3 | (United States) Jim Grabb (Mexico) Leonardo Lavalle | (West Germany) Alexander Mronz (United States) MaliVai Washington | (United States) Derrick Rostagno (United States) Jeff Tarango (United States) Tim Wilkison (Canada) Martin Wostenholme |
| 14 May | Italian Open; Rome, Italy; ATP Championship Series, Single-Week; Clay – $1,005,000 – 64S/32D; Singles – Doubles | (Austria) Thomas Muster; 6–1, 6–3, 6–1 | (Soviet Union) Andrei Chesnokov | (Spain) Emilio Sánchez (Ecuador) Andrés Gómez | (Argentina) Alberto Mancini (Argentina) Guillermo Pérez Roldán (Italy) Omar Camporese (France) Guy Forget |
| 14 May | Italian Open; Rome, Italy; ATP Championship Series, Single-Week; Clay – $1,005,000 – 64S/32D; Singles – Doubles | (Spain) Sergio Casal (Spain) Emilio Sánchez; 7–6, 7–5 | (United States) Jim Courier (United States) Martin Davis | (Spain) Emilio Sánchez (Ecuador) Andrés Gómez | (Argentina) Alberto Mancini (Argentina) Guillermo Pérez Roldán (Italy) Omar Camporese (France) Guy Forget |
| 14 May | Yugoslav Open; Umag, Yugoslavia; ATP World Series; Clay – $147,500 – 32S/16D; Singles – Doubles | (Socialist Federal Republic of Yugoslavia) Goran Prpić; 6–3, 4–6, 6–4 | (Socialist Federal Republic of Yugoslavia) Goran Ivanišević | (Argentina) Horacio de la Peña (Soviet Union) Andrei Cherkasov | (Argentina) Roberto Azar (Finland) Aki Rahunen (West Germany) Eric Jelen (France) Tarik Benhabiles |
| 14 May | Yugoslav Open; Umag, Yugoslavia; ATP World Series; Clay – $147,500 – 32S/16D; Singles – Doubles | (Czechoslovakia) Vojtěch Flégl (Czechoslovakia) Daniel Vacek; 6–4, 6–4 | (Soviet Union) Andrei Cherkasov (Soviet Union) Andrei Olhovskiy | (Argentina) Horacio de la Peña (Soviet Union) Andrei Cherkasov | (Argentina) Roberto Azar (Finland) Aki Rahunen (West Germany) Eric Jelen (France) Tarik Benhabiles |
| 21 May | Peugeot World Team Cup; Düsseldorf, West Germany; Clay – $900,000 – 8 teams (RR) | Yugoslavia; 3–0 | United States | Round robin (Red Group) | Round robin (Blue Group) |
| 21 May | Muratti-Time Internazionali di Tennis; Bologna, Italy; ATP World Series; Clay – $225,000 – 32S/16D | (Australia) Richard Fromberg; 4–6, 6–4, 7–6^{(7–5)} | (Switzerland) Marc Rosset | (France) Jérôme Potier (Argentina) Franco Davín | (Argentina) Guillermo Pérez Roldán (France) Thierry Tulasne (United States) Todd Witsken (United States) Lawson Duncan |
| 21 May | Muratti-Time Internazionali di Tennis; Bologna, Italy; ATP World Series; Clay – $225,000 – 32S/16D | (Argentina) Gustavo Luza (West Germany) Udo Riglewski; 7–6, 4–6, 6–1 | (France) Jérôme Potier (United States) Jim Pugh | (France) Jérôme Potier (Argentina) Franco Davín | (Argentina) Guillermo Pérez Roldán (France) Thierry Tulasne (United States) Todd Witsken (United States) Lawson Duncan |
| 28 May; 4 Jun | French Open; Paris, France; Grand Slam; Clay – $2,700,000 – 128S/64D/64XD; Singles – Doubles – Mixed doubles | (Ecuador) Andrés Gómez; 6–3, 2–6, 6–4, 6–4 | (United States) Andre Agassi | (Sweden) Jonas Svensson (Austria) Thomas Muster | (France) Henri Leconte (United States) Michael Chang (France) Thierry Champion (Socialist Federal Republic of Yugoslavia) Goran Ivanišević |
| 28 May; 4 Jun | French Open; Paris, France; Grand Slam; Clay – $2,700,000 – 128S/64D/64XD; Singles – Doubles – Mixed doubles | (Spain) Sergio Casal (Spain) Emilio Sánchez; 7–5, 6–3 | (Socialist Federal Republic of Yugoslavia) Goran Ivanišević (Czechoslovakia) Petr Korda | (Sweden) Jonas Svensson (Austria) Thomas Muster | (France) Henri Leconte (United States) Michael Chang (France) Thierry Champion (Socialist Federal Republic of Yugoslavia) Goran Ivanišević |
| 28 May; 4 Jun | French Open; Paris, France; Grand Slam; Clay – $2,700,000 – 128S/64D/64XD; Singles – Doubles – Mixed doubles | (Spain) Arantxa Sánchez Vicario (Mexico) Jorge Lozano; 7–6^{(7–5)}, 7–6^{(8–6)} | (Australia) Nicole Provis (South Africa) Danie Visser | (Sweden) Jonas Svensson (Austria) Thomas Muster | (France) Henri Leconte (United States) Michael Chang (France) Thierry Champion (Socialist Federal Republic of Yugoslavia) Goran Ivanišević |

=== June ===
| Week | Tournament | Champions | Runners-up | Semifinalists | Quarterfinalists |
|---|---|---|---|---|---|
| 11 Jun | Stella Artois Championships; London, United Kingdom; ATP World Series; Grass – $450,000 – 56S/28D; Singles – Doubles | (Czechoslovakia) Ivan Lendl; 6–3, 6–2 | (West Germany) Boris Becker | (United States) John McEnroe (Sweden) Stefan Edberg | (United States) David Pate (Australia) Richard Fromberg (United States) David Wheaton (South Africa) Christo van Rensburg |
| 11 Jun | Stella Artois Championships; London, United Kingdom; ATP World Series; Grass – $450,000 – 56S/28D; Singles – Doubles | (United Kingdom) Jeremy Bates (United States) Kevin Curren; 7–6, 6–4 | (France) Henri Leconte (Czechoslovakia) Ivan Lendl | (United States) John McEnroe (Sweden) Stefan Edberg | (United States) David Pate (Australia) Richard Fromberg (United States) David Wheaton (South Africa) Christo van Rensburg |
| 11 Jun | Internazionali di Firenze; Florence, Italy; ATP World Series; Clay – $225,000 – 32S/16D; Singles – Doubles | (Sweden) Magnus Larsson; 6–7, 7–5, 6–0 | (United States) Lawson Duncan | (Finland) Aki Rahunen (Italy) Omar Camporese | (Argentina) Guillermo Pérez Roldán (Spain) Javier Sánchez (Spain) Tomás Carbonell (Spain) Fernando Luna |
| 11 Jun | Internazionali di Firenze; Florence, Italy; ATP World Series; Clay – $225,000 – 32S/16D; Singles – Doubles | (Spain) Sergi Bruguera (Argentina) Horacio de la Peña; 3–6, 6–3, 6–4 | (Brazil) Luiz Mattar (Uruguay) Diego Pérez | (Finland) Aki Rahunen (Italy) Omar Camporese | (Argentina) Guillermo Pérez Roldán (Spain) Javier Sánchez (Spain) Tomás Carbonell (Spain) Fernando Luna |
| 11 Jun | Continental Grass Court Championships; Rosmalen, Netherlands; ATP World Series; Grass – $225,000 – 32S/16D; Singles – Doubles | (Israel) Amos Mansdorf; 6–3, 7–6 | (Soviet Union) Alexander Volkov | (United States) Richey Reneberg (United States) Patrick McEnroe | (Sweden) Henrik Holm (Sweden) David Engel (United States) Glenn Layendecker (United States) Robbie Weiss |
| 11 Jun | Continental Grass Court Championships; Rosmalen, Netherlands; ATP World Series; Grass – $225,000 – 32S/16D; Singles – Doubles | (Switzerland) Jakob Hlasek (West Germany) Michael Stich; 7–6, 6–3 | (United States) Jim Grabb (United States) Patrick McEnroe | (United States) Richey Reneberg (United States) Patrick McEnroe | (Sweden) Henrik Holm (Sweden) David Engel (United States) Glenn Layendecker (United States) Robbie Weiss |
| 18 Jun | Campionati Internazionali di Puglia; Genoa, Italy; ATP World Series; Clay – $225,000 – 32S/16D | (Haiti) Ronald Agénor; 3–6, 6–4, 6–3 | (France) Tarik Benhabiles | (France) Cédric Pioline (Italy) Omar Camporese | (West Germany) Udo Riglewski (Netherlands) Mark Koevermans (Brazil) Luiz Mattar (Austria) Horst Skoff |
| 18 Jun | Campionati Internazionali di Puglia; Genoa, Italy; ATP World Series; Clay – $225,000 – 32S/16D | (Spain) Tomás Carbonell (West Germany) Udo Riglewski; 7–6, 7–6 | (Italy) Cristiano Caratti (Italy) Federico Mordegan | (France) Cédric Pioline (Italy) Omar Camporese | (West Germany) Udo Riglewski (Netherlands) Mark Koevermans (Brazil) Luiz Mattar (Austria) Horst Skoff |
| 18 Jun | Direct Line Insurance Open; Manchester, United Kingdom; ATP World Series; Grass – $225,000 – 32S/16D; Singles – Doubles | (United States) Pete Sampras; 7–6^{(11–9)}, 7–6^{(7–3)} | (Israel) Gilad Bloom | (United Kingdom) Nick Brown (West Germany) Eric Jelen | (United States) Kelly Jones (Australia) Mark Kratzmann (South Africa) Christo van Rensburg (New Zealand) Kelly Evernden |
| 18 Jun | Direct Line Insurance Open; Manchester, United Kingdom; ATP World Series; Grass – $225,000 – 32S/16D; Singles – Doubles | (Australia) Mark Kratzmann (Australia) Jason Stoltenberg; 6–3, 2–6, 6–4 | (United Kingdom) Nick Brown (United States) Kelly Jones | (United Kingdom) Nick Brown (West Germany) Eric Jelen | (United States) Kelly Jones (Australia) Mark Kratzmann (South Africa) Christo van Rensburg (New Zealand) Kelly Evernden |
| 25 Jun; 2 Jul | Wimbledon Championships; London, United Kingdom; Grand Slam; Grass – $2,670,863 – 128S/64D/64XD; Singles – Doubles – Mixed doubles | (Sweden) Stefan Edberg; 6–2, 6–2, 3–6, 3–6, 6–4 | (West Germany) Boris Becker | (Czechoslovakia) Ivan Lendl (Socialist Federal Republic of Yugoslavia) Goran Ivanišević | (United States) Brad Pearce (Sweden) Christian Bergström (United States) Kevin Curren (United States) Brad Gilbert |
| 25 Jun; 2 Jul | Wimbledon Championships; London, United Kingdom; Grand Slam; Grass – $2,670,863 – 128S/64D/64XD; Singles – Doubles – Mixed doubles | (United States) Rick Leach (United States) Jim Pugh; 7–6^{(7–5)}, 7–6^{(7–4)}, 7–6^{(7–5)} | (South Africa) Pieter Aldrich (South Africa) Danie Visser | (Czechoslovakia) Ivan Lendl (Socialist Federal Republic of Yugoslavia) Goran Ivanišević | (United States) Brad Pearce (Sweden) Christian Bergström (United States) Kevin Curren (United States) Brad Gilbert |
| 25 Jun; 2 Jul | Wimbledon Championships; London, United Kingdom; Grand Slam; Grass – $2,670,863 – 128S/64D/64XD; Singles – Doubles – Mixed doubles | (United States) Zina Garrison (United States) Rick Leach; 7–5, 6–2 | (Australia) Elizabeth Smylie (Australia) John Fitzgerald | (Czechoslovakia) Ivan Lendl (Socialist Federal Republic of Yugoslavia) Goran Ivanišević | (United States) Brad Pearce (Sweden) Christian Bergström (United States) Kevin Curren (United States) Brad Gilbert |

=== July ===
| Week | Tournament | Champions | Runners-up | Semifinalists | Quarterfinalists |
|---|---|---|---|---|---|
| 9 Jul | Rado Swiss Open; Gstaad, Switzerland; ATP World Series; Clay – $275,000 – 32S/16D; Singles – Doubles | (Argentina) Martín Jaite; 6–3, 6–7^{(5–7)}, 6–2, 6–2 | (Spain) Sergi Bruguera | (Haiti) Ronald Agénor (Switzerland) Marc Rosset | (West Germany) Carl-Uwe Steeb (United States) Jim Courier (Soviet Union) Andrei Chesnokov (Spain) Emilio Sánchez |
| 9 Jul | Rado Swiss Open; Gstaad, Switzerland; ATP World Series; Clay – $275,000 – 32S/16D; Singles – Doubles | (Spain) Sergio Casal (Spain) Emilio Sánchez; 6–3, 3–6, 7–5 | (Italy) Omar Camporese (Spain) Javier Sánchez | (Haiti) Ronald Agénor (Switzerland) Marc Rosset | (West Germany) Carl-Uwe Steeb (United States) Jim Courier (Soviet Union) Andrei Chesnokov (Spain) Emilio Sánchez |
| 9 Jul | Swedish Open; Båstad, Sweden; ATP World Series; Clay – $225,000 – 32S/16D; Singles – Doubles | (Australia) Richard Fromberg; 6–2, 7–6^{(7–5)} | (Sweden) Magnus Larsson | (Sweden) Lars Jönsson (Uruguay) Marcelo Filippini | (Finland) Veli Paloheimo (Uruguay) Diego Pérez (Socialist Federal Republic of Yugoslavia) Goran Prpić (Finland) Aki Rahunen |
| 9 Jul | Swedish Open; Båstad, Sweden; ATP World Series; Clay – $225,000 – 32S/16D; Singles – Doubles | (Sweden) Ronnie Båthman (Sweden) Rikard Bergh; 6–1, 6–4 | (Sweden) Jan Gunnarsson (West Germany) Udo Riglewski | (Sweden) Lars Jönsson (Uruguay) Marcelo Filippini | (Finland) Veli Paloheimo (Uruguay) Diego Pérez (Socialist Federal Republic of Yugoslavia) Goran Prpić (Finland) Aki Rahunen |
| 9 Jul | Volvo Hall of Fame Championships; Newport, Rhode Island, US; ATP World Series; Grass – $150,000 – 32S/16D | (South Africa) Pieter Aldrich; 7–6^{(12–10)}, 1–6, 6–1 | (Australia) Darren Cahill | (South Africa) Gary Muller (West Germany) Eric Jelen | (United States) Robbie Weiss (United States) Jim Pugh (Australia) Mark Kratzmann (Sweden) Peter Lundgren |
| 9 Jul | Volvo Hall of Fame Championships; Newport, Rhode Island, US; ATP World Series; Grass – $150,000 – 32S/16D | (Australia) Darren Cahill (Australia) Mark Kratzmann; 7–6, 6–2 | (United States) Todd Nelson (United States) Bryan Shelton | (South Africa) Gary Muller (West Germany) Eric Jelen | (United States) Robbie Weiss (United States) Jim Pugh (Australia) Mark Kratzmann (Sweden) Peter Lundgren |
| 16 Jul | Mercedes Cup; Stuttgart, West Germany; ATP Championship Series; Clay – $825,000 – 48S/24D; Singles – Doubles | (Socialist Federal Republic of Yugoslavia) Goran Ivanišević; 6–7^{(2–7)}, 6–1, 6–4, 7–6^{(7–5)} | (Argentina) Guillermo Pérez Roldán | (France) Henri Leconte (Spain) Emilio Sánchez | (Austria) Horst Skoff (Soviet Union) Andrei Cherkasov (Uruguay) Marcelo Filippini (West Germany) Eric Jelen |
| 16 Jul | Mercedes Cup; Stuttgart, West Germany; ATP Championship Series; Clay – $825,000 – 48S/24D; Singles – Doubles | (South Africa) Pieter Aldrich (South Africa) Danie Visser; 6–4, 7–5 | (Sweden) Per Henricsson (Sweden) Nicklas Utgren | (France) Henri Leconte (Spain) Emilio Sánchez | (Austria) Horst Skoff (Soviet Union) Andrei Cherkasov (Uruguay) Marcelo Filippini (West Germany) Eric Jelen |
| 16 Jul | Sovran Bank Classic; Washington, D.C., US; ATP Championship Series; Hard – $420,000 – 56S/28D; Singles – Doubles | (United States) Andre Agassi; 6–1, 6–4 | (United States) Jim Grabb | (United States) Michael Chang (United States) Brad Gilbert | (United States) Richey Reneberg (United States) Todd Witsken (United States) Derrick Rostagno (West Germany) Michael Stich |
| 16 Jul | Sovran Bank Classic; Washington, D.C., US; ATP Championship Series; Hard – $420,000 – 56S/28D; Singles – Doubles | (Canada) Grant Connell (Canada) Glenn Michibata; 2–6, 6–4, 6–2 | (Mexico) Jorge Lozano (United States) Todd Witsken | (United States) Michael Chang (United States) Brad Gilbert | (United States) Richey Reneberg (United States) Todd Witsken (United States) Derrick Rostagno (West Germany) Michael Stich |
| 23 Jul | Player's Canadian Open; Toronto, Ontario, Canada; ATP Championship Series, Single-Week; Hard – $930,000 – 56S/28D; Singles – Doubles | (United States) Michael Chang; 4–6, 6–3, 7–6^{(7–3)} | (United States) Jay Berger | (United States) Pete Sampras (Switzerland) Jakob Hlasek | (United States) Andre Agassi (United States) John McEnroe (United States) Tim Mayotte (United States) Todd Witsken |
| 23 Jul | Player's Canadian Open; Toronto, Ontario, Canada; ATP Championship Series, Single-Week; Hard – $930,000 – 56S/28D; Singles – Doubles | (United States) Paul Annacone (United States) David Wheaton; 6–4, 6–4 | (Australia) Broderick Dyke (Sweden) Peter Lundgren | (United States) Pete Sampras (Switzerland) Jakob Hlasek | (United States) Andre Agassi (United States) John McEnroe (United States) Tim Mayotte (United States) Todd Witsken |
| 23 Jul | Dutch Open; Hilversum, Netherlands; ATP World Series; Clay – $215,000 – 32S/16D; Singles – Doubles | (Spain) Francisco Clavet; 3–6, 6–4, 6–2, 6–0 | (Belgium) Eduardo Masso | (Spain) Emilio Sánchez (Italy) Omar Camporese | (France) Olivier Delaître (Spain) Sergi Bruguera (Haiti) Ronald Agénor (Argentina) Martín Jaite |
| 23 Jul | Dutch Open; Hilversum, Netherlands; ATP World Series; Clay – $215,000 – 32S/16D; Singles – Doubles | (Spain) Sergio Casal (Spain) Emilio Sánchez; 7–5, 7–5 | (Netherlands) Paul Haarhuis (Netherlands) Mark Koevermans | (Spain) Emilio Sánchez (Italy) Omar Camporese | (France) Olivier Delaître (Spain) Sergi Bruguera (Haiti) Ronald Agénor (Argentina) Martín Jaite |
| 30 Jul | Philips Austrian Open; Kitzbühel, Austria; ATP World Series; Clay – $337,500 – 48S/24D; Singles – Doubles | (Argentina) Horacio de la Peña; 6–4, 7–6^{(7–4)}, 2–6, 6–2 | (Czechoslovakia) Karel Nováček | (Austria) Horst Skoff (Spain) Emilio Sánchez | (West Germany) Boris Becker (Austria) Thomas Muster (Soviet Union) Andrei Cherkasov (Spain) Sergi Bruguera |
| 30 Jul | Philips Austrian Open; Kitzbühel, Austria; ATP World Series; Clay – $337,500 – 48S/24D; Singles – Doubles | (Spain) Javier Sánchez (France) Éric Winogradsky; 6–4, 4–6, 6–4 | (Spain) Francisco Clavet (Austria) Horst Skoff | (Austria) Horst Skoff (Spain) Emilio Sánchez | (West Germany) Boris Becker (Austria) Thomas Muster (Soviet Union) Andrei Cherkasov (Spain) Sergi Bruguera |
| 30 Jul | Volvo Tennis Los Angeles; Los Angeles, CA, US; ATP World Series; Hard – $225,000 – 32S/16D; Singles – Doubles | (Sweden) Stefan Edberg; 7–6^{(7–4)}, 2–6, 7–6^{(7–3)} | (United States) Michael Chang | (United States) Pete Sampras (South Africa) Gary Muller | (United States) Jeff Tarango (Australia) Jason Stoltenberg (United States) Dan Goldie (United States) Brian Garrow |
| 30 Jul | Volvo Tennis Los Angeles; Los Angeles, CA, US; ATP World Series; Hard – $225,000 – 32S/16D; Singles – Doubles | (United States) Scott Davis (United States) David Pate; 3–6, 6–1, 6–3 | (Sweden) Peter Lundgren (Kenya) Paul Wekesa | (United States) Pete Sampras (South Africa) Gary Muller | (United States) Jeff Tarango (Australia) Jason Stoltenberg (United States) Dan Goldie (United States) Brian Garrow |
| 30 Jul | Sanremo Open; San Remo, Italy; ATP World Series; Clay – $225,000 – 32S/16D; Singles – Doubles | (Spain) Jordi Arrese; 6–2, 6–2 | (Spain) Juan Aguilera | (Uruguay) Marcelo Filippini (Argentina) Roberto Azar | (Argentina) Guillermo Pérez Roldán (Italy) Renzo Furlan (Switzerland) Claudio Mezzadri (Italy) Omar Camporese |
| 30 Jul | Sanremo Open; San Remo, Italy; ATP World Series; Clay – $225,000 – 32S/16D; Singles – Doubles | (Romania) Mihnea-Ion Năstase (Socialist Federal Republic of Yugoslavia) Goran Prpić; 3–6, 7–6, 6–3 | (Sweden) Ola Jonsson (Sweden) Fredrik Nilsson | (Uruguay) Marcelo Filippini (Argentina) Roberto Azar | (Argentina) Guillermo Pérez Roldán (Italy) Renzo Furlan (Switzerland) Claudio Mezzadri (Italy) Omar Camporese |

=== August ===
| Week | Tournament | Champions | Runners-up | Semifinalists | Quarterfinalists |
|---|---|---|---|---|---|
| 6 Aug | Thriftway ATP Championships; Mason, Ohio, US; ATP Championship Series, Single-Week; Hard – $1,020,000 – 56S/28D; Singles – Doubles | (Sweden) Stefan Edberg; 6–1, 6–1 | (United States) Brad Gilbert | (Ecuador) Andrés Gómez (United States) Scott Davis | (United States) Michael Chang (United States) Jim Courier (Switzerland) Jakob Hlasek (Australia) Richard Fromberg |
| 6 Aug | Thriftway ATP Championships; Mason, Ohio, US; ATP Championship Series, Single-Week; Hard – $1,020,000 – 56S/28D; Singles – Doubles | (Australia) Darren Cahill (Australia) Mark Kratzmann; 7–6, 6–4 | (United Kingdom) Neil Broad (South Africa) Gary Muller | (Ecuador) Andrés Gómez (United States) Scott Davis | (United States) Michael Chang (United States) Jim Courier (Switzerland) Jakob Hlasek (Australia) Richard Fromberg |
| 6 Aug | Czechoslovak Open; Prague, Czechoslovakia; ATP World Series; Clay – $148,400 – 32S/16D; Singles – Doubles | (Spain) Jordi Arrese; 7–6^{(7–3)}, 7–6^{(8–6)} | (Sweden) Nicklas Kulti | (Argentina) Horacio de la Peña (Socialist Federal Republic of Yugoslavia) Goran Prpić | (France) Tarik Benhabiles (Argentina) Franco Davín (Austria) Horst Skoff (West Germany) Christian Saceanu |
| 6 Aug | Czechoslovak Open; Prague, Czechoslovakia; ATP World Series; Clay – $148,400 – 32S/16D; Singles – Doubles | (Czechoslovakia) Vojtěch Flégl (Czechoslovakia) Daniel Vacek; 5–7, 6–4, 6–3 | (Romania) George Cosac (Romania) Florin Segărceanu | (Argentina) Horacio de la Peña (Socialist Federal Republic of Yugoslavia) Goran Prpić | (France) Tarik Benhabiles (Argentina) Franco Davín (Austria) Horst Skoff (West Germany) Christian Saceanu |
| 13 Aug | GTE U.S. Men's Hard Court Championships; Indianapolis, IN, US; ATP Championship Series; Hard – $825,000 – 56S/28D; Singles – Doubles | (West Germany) Boris Becker; 6–3, 6–4 | (Sweden) Peter Lundgren | (United States) Jay Berger (United States) Richey Reneberg | (United States) Jim Courier (New Zealand) Kelly Evernden (United States) Pete Sampras (United States) Andre Agassi |
| 13 Aug | GTE U.S. Men's Hard Court Championships; Indianapolis, IN, US; ATP Championship Series; Hard – $825,000 – 56S/28D; Singles – Doubles | (United States) Scott Davis (United States) David Pate; 7–6, 7–6 | (Canada) Grant Connell (Canada) Glenn Michibata | (United States) Jay Berger (United States) Richey Reneberg | (United States) Jim Courier (New Zealand) Kelly Evernden (United States) Pete Sampras (United States) Andre Agassi |
| 13 Aug | Volvo International; New Haven, CT, US; ATP Championship Series; Hard – $825,000 – 56S/28D; Singles – Doubles | (United States) Derrick Rostagno; 6–3, 6–3 | (Australia) Todd Woodbridge | (Australia) Mark Woodforde (Soviet Union) Andrei Chesnokov | (United States) Bryan Shelton (Australia) Wally Masur (Italy) Cristiano Caratti (South Africa) Christo van Rensburg |
| 13 Aug | Volvo International; New Haven, CT, US; ATP Championship Series; Hard – $825,000 – 56S/28D; Singles – Doubles | (United States) Jimmy Brown (United States) Scott Melville; 7–5, 7–6 | (Socialist Federal Republic of Yugoslavia) Goran Ivanišević (Czechoslovakia) Petr Korda | (Australia) Mark Woodforde (Soviet Union) Andrei Chesnokov | (United States) Bryan Shelton (Australia) Wally Masur (Italy) Cristiano Caratti (South Africa) Christo van Rensburg |
| 20 Aug | Norstar Bank Hamlet Challenge Cup; Long Island, NY, US; ATP World Series; Hard – $225,000 – 28S/16D; Singles – Doubles | (Sweden) Stefan Edberg; 7–6^{(7–3)}, 6–3 | (Socialist Federal Republic of Yugoslavia) Goran Ivanišević | (United States) John McEnroe (France) Guy Forget | (Sweden) Jonas Svensson (United States) Brad Gilbert (United States) Pete Sampras (Ecuador) Andrés Gómez |
| 20 Aug | Norstar Bank Hamlet Challenge Cup; Long Island, NY, US; ATP World Series; Hard – $225,000 – 28S/16D; Singles – Doubles | (France) Guy Forget (Switzerland) Jakob Hlasek; 2–6, 6–3, 6–4 | (West Germany) Udo Riglewski (West Germany) Michael Stich | (United States) John McEnroe (France) Guy Forget | (Sweden) Jonas Svensson (United States) Brad Gilbert (United States) Pete Sampras (Ecuador) Andrés Gómez |
| 20 Aug | Campionati Internazionali di San Marino; San Marino, San Marino; ATP World Series; Clay – $125,000 – 32S/16D | (Argentina) Guillermo Pérez Roldán; 6–3, 6–3 | (Italy) Omar Camporese | (Uruguay) Marcelo Filippini (Sweden) Nicklas Kulti | (Italy) Renzo Furlan (Peru) Pablo Arraya (Argentina) Franco Davín (West Germany) Pavel Vojtíšek |
| 20 Aug | Campionati Internazionali di San Marino; San Marino, San Marino; ATP World Series; Clay – $125,000 – 32S/16D | (Czechoslovakia) Vojtěch Flégl (Czechoslovakia) Daniel Vacek; 6–1, 4–6, 7–6 | (Spain) Jordi Burillo (Spain) Marcos Górriz | (Uruguay) Marcelo Filippini (Sweden) Nicklas Kulti | (Italy) Renzo Furlan (Peru) Pablo Arraya (Argentina) Franco Davín (West Germany) Pavel Vojtíšek |
| 20 Aug | OTB International; Schenectady, NY, US; ATP World Series; Hard – $125,000 – 28S/16D; Singles – Doubles | (India) Ramesh Krishnan; 6–1, 6–1 | (New Zealand) Kelly Evernden | (Argentina) Martín Jaite (United States) Brad Pearce | (Soviet Union) Andrei Olhovskiy (United States) Chuck Adams (New Zealand) Steve Guy (Israel) Amos Mansdorf |
| 20 Aug | OTB International; Schenectady, NY, US; ATP World Series; Hard – $125,000 – 28S/16D; Singles – Doubles | (Australia) Richard Fromberg (United States) Brad Pearce; 6–2, 3–6, 7–6 | (United States) Brian Garrow (United States) Sven Salumaa | (Argentina) Martín Jaite (United States) Brad Pearce | (Soviet Union) Andrei Olhovskiy (United States) Chuck Adams (New Zealand) Steve Guy (Israel) Amos Mansdorf |
| 27 Aug; 3 Sep | US Open; New York City, NY, US; Grand Slam; Hard – $2,554,250 – 128S/64D/32XD; Singles – Doubles – Mixed doubles | (United States) Pete Sampras; 6–4, 6–3, 6–2 | (United States) Andre Agassi | (United States) John McEnroe (Germany) Boris Becker | (United States) David Wheaton (Czechoslovakia) Ivan Lendl (Soviet Union) Andrei Cherkasov (United States) Aaron Krickstein |
| 27 Aug; 3 Sep | US Open; New York City, NY, US; Grand Slam; Hard – $2,554,250 – 128S/64D/32XD; Singles – Doubles – Mixed doubles | (South Africa) Pieter Aldrich (South Africa) Danie Visser; 6–2, 7–6, 6–2 | (United States) Paul Annacone (United States) David Wheaton | (United States) John McEnroe (Germany) Boris Becker | (United States) David Wheaton (Czechoslovakia) Ivan Lendl (Soviet Union) Andrei Cherkasov (United States) Aaron Krickstein |
| 27 Aug; 3 Sep | US Open; New York City, NY, US; Grand Slam; Hard – $2,554,250 – 128S/64D/32XD; Singles – Doubles – Mixed doubles | (Australia) Elizabeth Smylie (Australia) Todd Woodbridge; 6–4, 6–2 | (Soviet Union) Natasha Zvereva (United States) Jim Pugh | (United States) John McEnroe (Germany) Boris Becker | (United States) David Wheaton (Czechoslovakia) Ivan Lendl (Soviet Union) Andrei Cherkasov (United States) Aaron Krickstein |

=== September ===
| Week | Tournament | Champions | Runners-up | Semifinalists | Quarterfinalists |
|---|---|---|---|---|---|
| 10 Sep | Grand Prix Passing Shot; Bordeaux, France; ATP World Series; Clay – $270,000 – 32S/16D; Singles – Doubles | (France) Guy Forget; 6–4, 6–3 | (Socialist Federal Republic of Yugoslavia) Goran Ivanišević | (Haiti) Ronald Agénor (Argentina) Guillermo Pérez Roldán | (Sweden) Tomas Nydahl (United States) Lawson Duncan (France) Thierry Champion (France) Fabrice Santoro |
| 10 Sep | Grand Prix Passing Shot; Bordeaux, France; ATP World Series; Clay – $270,000 – 32S/16D; Singles – Doubles | (Spain) Tomás Carbonell (Belgium) Libor Pimek; 6–3, 6–7, 6–2 | (Iran) Mansour Bahrami (France) Yannick Noah | (Haiti) Ronald Agénor (Argentina) Guillermo Pérez Roldán | (Sweden) Tomas Nydahl (United States) Lawson Duncan (France) Thierry Champion (France) Fabrice Santoro |
| 10 Sep | Barclay Open; Geneva, Switzerland; ATP World Series; Clay – $225,000 – 32S/16D; Singles – Doubles | (Austria) Horst Skoff; 7–6^{(10–8)}, 7–6^{(7–4)} | (Spain) Sergi Bruguera | (Denmark) Michael Tauson (Switzerland) Marc Rosset | (France) Henri Leconte (Argentina) Horacio de la Peña (Italy) Omar Camporese (Italy) Renzo Furlan |
| 10 Sep | Barclay Open; Geneva, Switzerland; ATP World Series; Clay – $225,000 – 32S/16D; Singles – Doubles | (Argentina) Pablo Albano (Sweden) David Engel; 6–3, 7–6 | (Australia) Neil Borwick (New Zealand) David Lewis | (Denmark) Michael Tauson (Switzerland) Marc Rosset | (France) Henri Leconte (Argentina) Horacio de la Peña (Italy) Omar Camporese (Italy) Renzo Furlan |
| 17 Sep | Davis Cup by NEC Semifinals; Sydney, Australia – grass Vienna, Austria – clay | Semifinal winners Australia 5–0; United States 3–2 | Semifinal losers Argentina; Austria | | |
| 24 Sep | Swiss Indoors; Basel, Switzerland; ATP World Series; Hard (i) – $450,000 – 32S/16D; Singles – Doubles | (United States) John McEnroe; 6–7^{(4–7)}, 4–6, 7–6^{(7–3)}, 6–3, 6–4 | (Socialist Federal Republic of Yugoslavia) Goran Ivanišević | (United States) Scott Melville (Finland) Veli Paloheimo | (France) Yannick Noah (Soviet Union) Andrei Cherkasov (Sweden) Magnus Gustafsson (West Germany) Michael Stich |
| 24 Sep | Swiss Indoors; Basel, Switzerland; ATP World Series; Hard (i) – $450,000 – 32S/16D; Singles – Doubles | (South Africa) Stefan Kruger (South Africa) Christo van Rensburg; 4–6, 7–6, 6–3 | (United Kingdom) Neil Broad (South Africa) Gary Muller | (United States) Scott Melville (Finland) Veli Paloheimo | (France) Yannick Noah (Soviet Union) Andrei Cherkasov (Sweden) Magnus Gustafsson (West Germany) Michael Stich |
| 24 Sep | Campionati Internazionali di Sicilia; Palermo, Italy; ATP World Series; Clay – $270,000 – 32S/16D; Singles – Doubles | (Argentina) Franco Davín; 6–1, 6–1 | (Spain) Juan Aguilera | (France) Thierry Champion (Argentina) Guillermo Pérez Roldán | (Czechoslovakia) Martin Střelba (Argentina) Horacio de la Peña (Italy) Claudio Pistolesi (Czechoslovakia) Marián Vajda |
| 24 Sep | Campionati Internazionali di Sicilia; Palermo, Italy; ATP World Series; Clay – $270,000 – 32S/16D; Singles – Doubles | (Spain) Sergio Casal (Spain) Emilio Sánchez; 6–3, 6–4 | (Spain) Carlos Costa (Argentina) Horacio de la Peña | (France) Thierry Champion (Argentina) Guillermo Pérez Roldán | (Czechoslovakia) Martin Střelba (Argentina) Horacio de la Peña (Italy) Claudio Pistolesi (Czechoslovakia) Marián Vajda |
| 24 Sep | Queensland Open; Brisbane, Australia; ATP World Series; Hard – $225,000 – 32S/16D | (United States) Brad Gilbert; 6–3, 6–1 | (United States) Aaron Krickstein | (West Germany) Carl-Uwe Steeb (Australia) John Fitzgerald | (Australia) Carl Limberger (Sweden) Niclas Kroon (United States) Robbie Weiss (West Germany) Eric Jelen |
| 24 Sep | Queensland Open; Brisbane, Australia; ATP World Series; Hard – $225,000 – 32S/16D | (Australia) Jason Stoltenberg (Australia) Todd Woodbridge; 2–6, 6–4, 6–4 | (United States) Brian Garrow (Australia) Mark Woodforde | (West Germany) Carl-Uwe Steeb (Australia) John Fitzgerald | (Australia) Carl Limberger (Sweden) Niclas Kroon (United States) Robbie Weiss (West Germany) Eric Jelen |

=== October ===
| Week | Tournament | Champions | Runners-up | Semifinalists | Quarterfinalists |
|---|---|---|---|---|---|
| 1 Oct | Australian Indoor Championships; Sydney, Australia; ATP Championship Series; Hard (i) – $750,000 – 48S/24D; Singles – Doubles | (West Germany) Boris Becker; 7–6^{(7–4)}, 6–4, 6–4 | (Sweden) Stefan Edberg | (Czechoslovakia) Ivan Lendl (Australia) Todd Woodbridge | (United States) David Wheaton (Sweden) Peter Lundgren (Canada) Grant Connell (United States) Richey Reneberg |
| 1 Oct | Australian Indoor Championships; Sydney, Australia; ATP Championship Series; Hard (i) – $750,000 – 48S/24D; Singles – Doubles | (Australia) Broderick Dyke (Sweden) Peter Lundgren; 6–2, 7–6 | (Sweden) Stefan Edberg (Czechoslovakia) Ivan Lendl | (Czechoslovakia) Ivan Lendl (Australia) Todd Woodbridge | (United States) David Wheaton (Sweden) Peter Lundgren (Canada) Grant Connell (United States) Richey Reneberg |
| 1 Oct | Grand Prix de Tennis de Toulouse; Toulouse, France; ATP World Series; Hard (i) – $260,000 – 32S/16D; Singles – Doubles | (Sweden) Jonas Svensson; 7–6^{(7–5)}, 6–2 | (France) Fabrice Santoro | (Haiti) Ronald Agénor (Israel) Amos Mansdorf | (Sweden) Christian Bergström (Soviet Union) Alexander Volkov (Sweden) Magnus Larsson (France) Yannick Noah |
| 1 Oct | Grand Prix de Tennis de Toulouse; Toulouse, France; ATP World Series; Hard (i) – $260,000 – 32S/16D; Singles – Doubles | (United Kingdom) Neil Broad (South Africa) Gary Muller; 7–6, 6–4 | (Denmark) Michael Mortensen (Netherlands) Michiel Schapers | (Haiti) Ronald Agénor (Israel) Amos Mansdorf | (Sweden) Christian Bergström (Soviet Union) Alexander Volkov (Sweden) Magnus Larsson (France) Yannick Noah |
| 1 Oct | Athens International; Athens, Greece; ATP World Series; Clay – $125,000 – 32S/16D; Singles – Doubles | (Netherlands) Mark Koevermans; 5–7, 6–4, 6–1 | (Argentina) Franco Davín | (Czechoslovakia) Marián Vajda (Spain) Jordi Arrese | (Spain) Tomás Carbonell (Argentina) Guillermo Pérez Roldán (Spain) Javier Sánchez (Spain) Francisco Roig |
| 1 Oct | Athens International; Athens, Greece; ATP World Series; Clay – $125,000 – 32S/16D; Singles – Doubles | (Spain) Sergio Casal (Spain) Javier Sánchez; 6–4, 6–3 | (Netherlands) Tom Kempers (Netherlands) Richard Krajicek | (Czechoslovakia) Marián Vajda (Spain) Jordi Arrese | (Spain) Tomás Carbonell (Argentina) Guillermo Pérez Roldán (Spain) Javier Sánchez (Spain) Francisco Roig |
| 8 Oct | Seiko Super Tennis Tournament; Tokyo, Japan; ATP Championship Series; Carpet (i) – $750,000 – 48S/24D; Singles – Doubles | (Czechoslovakia) Ivan Lendl; 4–6, 6–3, 7–6^{(7–5)} | (Germany) Boris Becker | (Sweden) Stefan Edberg (United States) Richey Reneberg | (Switzerland) Jakob Hlasek (United States) Scott Davis (Sweden) Thomas Högstedt (Soviet Union) Andrei Cherkasov |
| 8 Oct | Seiko Super Tennis Tournament; Tokyo, Japan; ATP Championship Series; Carpet (i) – $750,000 – 48S/24D; Singles – Doubles | (France) Guy Forget (Switzerland) Jakob Hlasek; 6–2, 4–6, 6–2 | (United States) Scott Davis (United States) David Pate | (Sweden) Stefan Edberg (United States) Richey Reneberg | (Switzerland) Jakob Hlasek (United States) Scott Davis (Sweden) Thomas Högstedt (Soviet Union) Andrei Cherkasov |
| 8 Oct | European Indoor Championships; Berlin, Germany; ATP World Series; Carpet (i) – $260,000 – 32S/16D; Singles – Doubles | (Haiti) Ronald Agénor; 4–6, 6–4, 7–6^{(10–8)} | (Soviet Union) Alexander Volkov | (Germany) Martin Sinner (Brazil) Luiz Mattar | (Czechoslovakia) Milan Šrejber (United States) Kevin Curren (France) Jean-Philippe Fleurian (Sweden) Jonas Svensson |
| 8 Oct | European Indoor Championships; Berlin, Germany; ATP World Series; Carpet (i) – $260,000 – 32S/16D; Singles – Doubles | (South Africa) Pieter Aldrich (South Africa) Danie Visser; 7–6, 7–6 | (United States) Kevin Curren (United States) Patrick Galbraith | (Germany) Martin Sinner (Brazil) Luiz Mattar | (Czechoslovakia) Milan Šrejber (United States) Kevin Curren (France) Jean-Philippe Fleurian (Sweden) Jonas Svensson |
| 8 Oct | Riklis Classic; Tel Aviv, Israel; ATP World Series; Hard – $125,000 – 32S/16D; Singles – Doubles | (Soviet Union) Andrei Chesnokov; 6–4, 6–3 | (Israel) Amos Mansdorf | (Israel) Gilad Bloom (United States) Jeff Tarango | (Sweden) Lars Jönsson (South Africa) Christo van Rensburg (Netherlands) Mark Koevermans (Nigeria) Nduka Odizor |
| 8 Oct | Riklis Classic; Tel Aviv, Israel; ATP World Series; Hard – $125,000 – 32S/16D; Singles – Doubles | (Nigeria) Nduka Odizor (South Africa) Christo van Rensburg; 6–3, 6–4 | (Sweden) Ronnie Båthman (Sweden) Rikard Bergh | (Israel) Gilad Bloom (United States) Jeff Tarango | (Sweden) Lars Jönsson (South Africa) Christo van Rensburg (Netherlands) Mark Koevermans (Nigeria) Nduka Odizor |
| 15 Oct | Grand Prix de Tennis de Lyon; Lyon, France; ATP World Series; Carpet (i) – $450,000 – 32S/16D; Singles – Doubles | (Switzerland) Marc Rosset; 6–3, 6–2 | (Sweden) Mats Wilander | (Germany) Alexander Mronz (United States) David Pate | (United States) Aaron Krickstein (Sweden) Jonas Svensson (Haiti) Ronald Agénor (South Africa) Gary Muller |
| 15 Oct | Grand Prix de Tennis de Lyon; Lyon, France; ATP World Series; Carpet (i) – $450,000 – 32S/16D; Singles – Doubles | (United States) Patrick Galbraith (United States) Kelly Jones; 7–6, 6–4 | (United States) Jim Grabb (United States) David Pate | (Germany) Alexander Mronz (United States) David Pate | (United States) Aaron Krickstein (Sweden) Jonas Svensson (Haiti) Ronald Agénor (South Africa) Gary Muller |
| 15 Oct | CA-TennisTrophy; Vienna, Austria; ATP World Series; Carpet (i) – $225,000 – 32S/16D; Singles – Doubles | (Sweden) Anders Järryd; 6–3, 6–3, 6–1 | (Austria) Horst Skoff | (Austria) Thomas Muster (Soviet Union) Alexander Volkov | (Soviet Union) Andrei Olhovskiy (Sweden) Lars Jönsson (Argentina) Martín Jaite (United States) John McEnroe |
| 15 Oct | CA-TennisTrophy; Vienna, Austria; ATP World Series; Carpet (i) – $225,000 – 32S/16D; Singles – Doubles | (Germany) Udo Riglewski (Germany) Michael Stich; 6–4, 6–4 | (Mexico) Jorge Lozano (United States) Todd Witsken | (Austria) Thomas Muster (Soviet Union) Alexander Volkov | (Soviet Union) Andrei Olhovskiy (Sweden) Lars Jönsson (Argentina) Martín Jaite (United States) John McEnroe |
| 22 Oct | Stockholm Open; Stockholm, Sweden; ATP Championship Series, Single-Week; Carpet (i) – $840,000 – 48S/24D; Singles – Doubles | (Germany) Boris Becker; 6–4, 6–0, 6–3 | (Sweden) Stefan Edberg | (Soviet Union) Alexander Volkov (United States) Pete Sampras | (United States) Brad Gilbert (Sweden) Nicklas Kulti (United States) David Wheaton (Socialist Federal Republic of Yugoslavia) Goran Ivanišević |
| 22 Oct | Stockholm Open; Stockholm, Sweden; ATP Championship Series, Single-Week; Carpet (i) – $840,000 – 48S/24D; Singles – Doubles | (France) Guy Forget (Switzerland) Jakob Hlasek; 6–2, 6–3 | (Australia) John Fitzgerald (Sweden) Anders Järryd | (Soviet Union) Alexander Volkov (United States) Pete Sampras | (United States) Brad Gilbert (Sweden) Nicklas Kulti (United States) David Wheaton (Socialist Federal Republic of Yugoslavia) Goran Ivanišević |
| 22 Oct | Philips Open; São Paulo, Brazil; ATP World Series; Carpet – $125,000 – 32S/16D | (United States) Robbie Weiss; 3–6, 7–6^{(9–7)}, 6–3 | (Peru) Jaime Yzaga | (Netherlands) Jacco Eltingh (Brazil) Danilo Marcelino | (Puerto Rico) Miguel Nido (Portugal) João Cunha e Silva (United States) Chris Garner (Brazil) Luiz Mattar |
| 22 Oct | Philips Open; São Paulo, Brazil; ATP World Series; Carpet – $125,000 – 32S/16D | (United States) Shelby Cannon (Venezuela) Alfonso Mora; 6–7, 6–3, 7–6 | (Netherlands) Mark Koevermans (Brazil) Luiz Mattar | (Netherlands) Jacco Eltingh (Brazil) Danilo Marcelino | (Puerto Rico) Miguel Nido (Portugal) João Cunha e Silva (United States) Chris Garner (Brazil) Luiz Mattar |
| 29 Oct | Paris Open; Paris, France; ATP Championship Series, Single-Week; Carpet (i) – $1,650,000 – 48S/24D; Singles – Doubles | (Sweden) Stefan Edberg; 3–3 ret. | (Germany) Boris Becker | (Spain) Sergi Bruguera (Sweden) Jonas Svensson | (Switzerland) Jakob Hlasek (France) Guillaume Raoux (Spain) Emilio Sánchez (Germany) Michael Stich |
| 29 Oct | Paris Open; Paris, France; ATP Championship Series, Single-Week; Carpet (i) – $1,650,000 – 48S/24D; Singles – Doubles | (United States) Scott Davis (United States) David Pate; 7–6, 7–6 | (Australia) Darren Cahill (Australia) Mark Kratzmann | (Spain) Sergi Bruguera (Sweden) Jonas Svensson | (Switzerland) Jakob Hlasek (France) Guillaume Raoux (Spain) Emilio Sánchez (Germany) Michael Stich |

=== November ===
| Week | Tournament | Champions | Runners-up | Semifinalists | Quarterfinalists |
|---|---|---|---|---|---|
| 5 Nov | Bayer Kremlin Cup; Moscow, Soviet Union; ATP World Series; Carpet (i) – $297,000 – 32S/16D; Singles – Doubles | (Soviet Union) Andrei Cherkasov; 6–2, 6–1 | (United States) Tim Mayotte | (Czechoslovakia) Petr Korda (Germany) Udo Riglewski | (Sweden) Anders Järryd (Soviet Union) Alexander Volkov (Spain) Sergio Casal (Spain) Emilio Sánchez |
| 5 Nov | Bayer Kremlin Cup; Moscow, Soviet Union; ATP World Series; Carpet (i) – $297,000 – 32S/16D; Singles – Doubles | (Netherlands) Hendrik Jan Davids (Netherlands) Paul Haarhuis; 6–4, 7–6 | (Australia) John Fitzgerald (Sweden) Anders Järryd | (Czechoslovakia) Petr Korda (Germany) Udo Riglewski | (Sweden) Anders Järryd (Soviet Union) Alexander Volkov (Spain) Sergio Casal (Spain) Emilio Sánchez |
| 5 Nov | Diet Pepsi Championships; London, United Kingdom; ATP World Series; Carpet (i) – $297,000 – 32S/16D; Singles – Doubles | (Switzerland) Jakob Hlasek; 7–6^{(9–7)}, 6–3 | (United States) Michael Chang | (Sweden) Christian Bergström (Italy) Diego Nargiso | (United States) Patrick McEnroe (Sweden) Peter Lundgren (Sweden) Magnus Larsson (Socialist Federal Republic of Yugoslavia) Goran Ivanišević |
| 5 Nov | Diet Pepsi Championships; London, United Kingdom; ATP World Series; Carpet (i) – $297,000 – 32S/16D; Singles – Doubles | (United States) Jim Grabb (United States) Patrick McEnroe; 7–6, 4–6, 6–3 | (United States) Rick Leach (United States) Jim Pugh | (Sweden) Christian Bergström (Italy) Diego Nargiso | (United States) Patrick McEnroe (Sweden) Peter Lundgren (Sweden) Magnus Larsson (Socialist Federal Republic of Yugoslavia) Goran Ivanišević |
| 5 Nov | Citibank Open; Itaparica, Brazil; ATP World Series; Hard – $225,000 – 32S/16D; Singles – Doubles | (Sweden) Mats Wilander; 6–1, 6–2 | (Uruguay) Marcelo Filippini | (Spain) Tomás Carbonell (Netherlands) Mark Koevermans | (Portugal) Nuno Marques (Brazil) Cássio Motta (Canada) Andrew Sznajder (Venezuela) Maurice Ruah |
| 5 Nov | Citibank Open; Itaparica, Brazil; ATP World Series; Hard – $225,000 – 32S/16D; Singles – Doubles | (Brazil) Mauro Menezes (Brazil) Fernando Roese; 7–6, 7–5 | (Spain) Tomás Carbonell (Spain) Marcos Aurelio Gorriz | (Spain) Tomás Carbonell (Netherlands) Mark Koevermans | (Portugal) Nuno Marques (Brazil) Cássio Motta (Canada) Andrew Sznajder (Venezuela) Maurice Ruah |
| 12 Nov | ATP Tour World Championships (singles); Frankfurt, Germany; ATP Tour World Championships; Carpet (i) – $2,020,000 – 8S (RR); Singles | (United States) Andre Agassi; 5–7, 7–6^{(7–5)}, 7–5, 6–2 | (Sweden) Stefan Edberg | (Czechoslovakia) Ivan Lendl (Germany) Boris Becker | Round robin (United States) Pete Sampras (Spain) Emilio Sánchez (Austria) Thomas Muster (Ecuador) Andrés Gómez |
| 19 Nov | ATP Tour World Championships (doubles); Gold Coast, Australia; ATP Tour World Championships; Hard – $1,000,000 – 8D (RR); Doubles | (France) Guy Forget (Switzerland) Jakob Hlasek; 6–4, 7–6^{(7–5)}, 5–7, 6–4 | (Spain) Sergio Casal (Spain) Emilio Sánchez | (United States) Scott Davis / (United States) David Pate (Canada) Grant Connell / (Canada) Glenn Michibata | |
| 26 Nov | Davis Cup by NEC Final; St. Petersburg, Florida, US – clay (i) | United States; 3–1 | Australia | | |

=== December ===
| Week | Tournament | Champions | Runners-up | Semifinalists | Quarterfinalists |
|---|---|---|---|---|---|
| 10 Dec | Compaq Grand Slam Cup; Munich, Germany; Grand Slam Cup; Carpet (i) – $6,000,000 – 16S; Singles | (United States) Pete Sampras; 6–3, 6–4, 6–2 | (United States) Brad Gilbert | (United States) Michael Chang (United States) David Wheaton | (France) Henri Leconte (Socialist Federal Republic of Yugoslavia) Goran Ivanišević (United States) Aaron Krickstein (Czechoslovakia) Ivan Lendl |

== ATP rankings ==
As of 1 January 1990
| Rk | Name | Nation | Points |
|---|---|---|---|
| 1 | Ivan Lendl | TCH | 2913 |
| 2 | Boris Becker | GER (Note: West Germany (FRG) prior to 3 October 1990.) | 2279 |
| 3 | Stefan Edberg | SWE | 2111 |
| 4 | Brad Gilbert | USA | 1398 |
| 5 | John McEnroe | USA | 1354 |
| 6 | Michael Chang | USA | 1328 |
| 7 | Aaron Krickstein | USA | 1217 |
| 8 | Andre Agassi | USA | 1160 |
| 9 | Jay Berger | USA | 1039 |
| 10 | Alberto Mancini | ARG | 1024 |
| 11 | Martín Jaite | ARG | 945 |
| 12 | Tim Mayotte | USA | 871 |
| 13 | Mats Wilander | SWE | 780 |
| 14 | Andrés Gómez | ECU | 742 |
| 15 | Carl-Uwe Steeb | GER | 738 |
| 16 | Jimmy Connors | USA | 733 |
| 17 | Emilio Sánchez | ESP | 706 |
| 18 | Horst Skoff | AUT | 695 |
| 19 | Andrei Chesnokov | URS | 688 |
| 20 | Kevin Curren | USA | 684 |

Year-end rankings 1990 (31 December 1990)
| Rk | Name | Nation | Points | High | Low | Change |
|---|---|---|---|---|---|---|
| 1 | Stefan Edberg | SWE | 3889 | 1 | 3 | ▲2 |
| 2 | Boris Becker | GER | 3528 | 2 | 3 | Steady |
| 3 | Ivan Lendl | TCH | 2581 | 1 | 3 | ▼2 |
| 4 | Andre Agassi | USA | 2398 | 4 | 8 | ▲4 |
| 5 | Pete Sampras | USA | 1888 | 5 | 69 | ▲56 |
| 6 | Andrés Gómez | ECU | 1680 | 4 | 18 | ▲8 |
| 7 | Thomas Muster | AUT | 1654 | 6 | 34 | ▲27 |
| 8 | Emilio Sánchez | ESP | 1564 | 7 | 19 | ▲9 |
| 9 | Goran Ivanišević | YUG | 1514 | 9 | 53 | ▲20 |
| 10 | Brad Gilbert | USA | 1451 | 4 | 10 | ▼6 |
| 11 | Jonas Svensson | SWE | 1365 | 11 | 51 | ▲30 |
| 12 | Andrei Chesnokov | URS | 1361 | 10 | 21 | ▲7 |
| 13 | John McEnroe | USA | 1210 | 4 | 21 | ▼8 |
| 14 | Guillermo Pérez Roldán | ARG | 1190 | 14 | 37 | ▲16 |
| 15 | Michael Chang | USA | 1119 | 5 | 24 | ▼9 |
| 16 | Guy Forget | FRA | 1101 | 14 | 81 | ▲39 |
| 17 | Jakob Hlasek | SUI | 1089 | 17 | 56 | ▲11 |
| 18 | Jay Berger | USA | 1066 | 7 | 18 | ▼9 |
| 19 | Juan Aguilera | ESP | 1042 | 14 | 74 | ▲45 |
| 20 | Aaron Krickstein | USA | 1025 | 6 | 20 | ▼13 |

== Statistical information ==
List of players and titles won, alphabetically by last name:

- (United States) Andre Agassi – San Francisco, Miami Masters, Washington, D.C., Season-Ending Championships (4)
- (Haiti) Ronald Agénor – Genova, Berlin (2)
- (Spain) Juan Aguilera – Nice, Hamburg Masters (2)
- (South Africa) Pieter Aldrich – Newport (1)
- (Austria) Alex Antonitsch – Seoul (1)
- (Spain) Jordi Arrese – San Remo, Prague (2)
- (Germany) Boris Becker – Brussels, Stuttgart, Indianapolis, Sydney Indoors, Stockholm Masters (5)
- (Australia) Pat Cash – Hong Kong (1)
- (United States) Michael Chang – Canada Masters (1)
- (Soviet Union) Andrei Cherkasov – Moscow (1)
- (Soviet Union) Andrei Chesnokov – Monte Carlo Masters, Tel Aviv (2)
- (Spain) Francisco Clavet – Hilversum (1)
- (Sweden) Stefan Edberg – Indian Wells Masters, Tokyo, Wimbledon, Los Angeles, Cincinnati Masters, Long Island, Paris Masters (7)
- (Argentina) Franco Davín – Palermo (1)
- (United States) Scott Davis – Auckland (1)
- (France) Guy Forget – Bordeaux (1)
- (Australia) Richard Fromberg – Bologna, Båstad (2)
- (United States) Brad Gilbert – Rotterdam, Orlando, Brisbane (3)
- (Ecuador) Andrés Gómez – Barcelona, Madrid, French Open (3)
- (Switzerland) Jakob Hlasek – Wembley (1)
- (Socialist Federal Republic of Yugoslavia) Goran Ivanišević – Stuttgart (1)
- (Argentina) Martín Jaite – Guarujá, Gstaad (2)
- (Sweden) Anders Järryd – Vienna (1)
- (United States) Kelly Jones – Singapore (1)
- (Netherlands) Mark Koevermans – Athens (1)
- (India) Ramesh Krishnan – Schenectady (1)
- (Sweden) Magnus Larsson – Florence (1)
- (Czechoslovakia) Ivan Lendl – Australian Open, Milan, Toronto, London, Tokyo Indoors (5)
- (Israel) Amos Mansdorf – Rosmalen (1)
- (Brazil) Luiz Mattar – Rio de Janeiro (1)
- (United States) John McEnroe – Basel (1)
- (Austria) Thomas Muster – Adelaide, Casablanca, Rome Masters (3)
- (France) Yannick Noah – Sydney (1)
- (Czechoslovakia) Karel Nováček – Munich (1)
- (Argentina) Horacio de la Peña – Kitzbühel (1)
- (Argentina) Guillermo Pérez Roldán – San Marino (1)
- (Socialist Federal Republic of Yugoslavia) Goran Prpić – Umag (1)
- (Switzerland) Marc Rosset – Lyon (1)
- (United States) Derrick Rostagno – New Haven (1)
- (United States) Pete Sampras – Philadelphia, Manchester, US Open, Grand Slam Cup (4)
- (Spain) Emilio Sánchez – Wellington, Estoril (2)
- (Austria) Horst Skoff – Geneva (1)
- (Germany) Michael Stich – Memphis (1)
- (Sweden) Jonas Svensson – Toulouse (1)
- (United States) Robbie Weiss – São Paulo (1)
- (United States) David Wheaton – Kiawah Island (1)
- (Sweden) Mats Wilander – Itaparica (1)

The following players won their first title:

- (South Africa) Pieter Aldrich
- (Austria) Alex Antonitsch
- (Spain) Jordi Arrese
- (Soviet Union) Andrei Cherkasov
- (Spain) Francisco Clavet
- (Australia) Richard Fromberg
- (Socialist Federal Republic of Yugoslavia) Goran Ivanišević
- (Netherlands) Mark Koevermans
- (Sweden) Magnus Larsson
- (Socialist Federal Republic of Yugoslavia) Goran Prpić
- (United States) Derrick Rostagno
- (United States) Pete Sampras
- (Germany) Michael Stich
- (United States) David Wheaton
- (United States) Robbie Weiss

== See also ==
- 1990 WTA Tour
