= 1990 Philips Open São Paulo =

- Date: 22–28 October
- Edition: 5th
- Category: World Series
- Draw: 32S / 16D
- Prize money: $125,000
- Surface: Hard / outdoor
- Location: São Paulo, Brazil
- Venue: Hotel Transamerica

Champions

Singles
- (United States) Robbie Weiss

Doubles
- (United States) Shelby Cannon / (Venezuela) Alfonso Mora
- ATP São Paulo

The 1990 Philips Open was a men's tennis tournament played on outdoor hard courts at the Hotel Transamerica in São Paulo, Brazil that was part of the World Series category of the 1990 ATP Tour. It was the fifth edition of the tournament and took place from 22 October through 28 October 1990. Seventh-seeded Robbie Weiss, who entered the main draw as a lucky loser, won the singles title.

== Finals ==
=== Singles ===
(United States) Robbie Weiss defeated (Peru) Jaime Yzaga 3–6, 7–6^{(9–7)}, 6–3

- It was Weiss's only singles title of his career.

=== Doubles ===
(United States) Shelby Cannon / (Venezuela) Alfonso Mora defeated (Netherlands) Mark Koevermans / (Brazil) Luiz Mattar 6–7, 6–3, 7–6

- It was Cannon's only doubles title of the year and the 1st of his career. It was Mora's only doubles title of the year and the first of his career.
