= 1990 Muratti-Time Internazionali di Tennis =

ATP tennis tournament in Bologna

- Date: 21–27 May
- Edition: 6th
- Category: World Series
- Draw: 32S / 16D
- Prize money: $225,000
- Surface: Clay / outdoor
- Location: Bologna, Italy
- Venue: Cierrebi Club

Champions

Singles
- (Australia) Richard Fromberg

Doubles
- (Argentina) Gustavo Luza / (West Germany) Udo Riglewski
- Bologna Outdoor

The 1990 Muratti-Time Internazionali di Tennis, also known as the Bologna Saving Bank Trophy, was a men's tennis tournament played on outdoor clay courts at the Cierrebi Club in Bologna in Italy and was part of the World Series of the 1990 ATP Tour. It was the sixth edition of the tournament and was held from 21 May until 27 May 1990. Unseeded Richard Fromberg won the singles title.

== Finals ==
=== Singles ===
(Australia) Richard Fromberg defeated (Switzerland) Marc Rosset 4–6, 6–4, 7–6^{(7–5)}

- It was Fromberg's first singles title of his career.

=== Doubles ===
(Argentina) Gustavo Luza / (West Germany) Udo Riglewski defeated (France) Jérôme Potier / (United States) Jim Pugh 7–6, 4–6, 6–1

- It was Luza's 2nd and last doubles title of the year and the 3rd of his career. It was Riglewski's 2nd doubles title of the year and the 7th of his career.
