= 1990 IP Cup =

- Date: 18–24 June
- Edition: 11th
- Category: ATP World Series
- Draw: 32S / 16D
- Prize money: $225,000
- Surface: Clay / outdoor
- Location: Genoa, Italy

Champions

Singles
- (Haiti) Ronald Agénor

Doubles
- (Spain) Tomás Carbonell / (Germany) Udo Riglewski
- ATP St. Pölten

The 1990 IP Cup, also known as the International Championships of Puglia, was a men's tennis tournament held on outdoor clay courts in Genoa, Italy that was part of the World Series of the 1990 ATP Tour. It was the 11th edition of the tournament and was held from 18 June until 24 June 1990. Eighth-seeded Ronald Agénor, who entered the main draw on a wildcard, won the singles title.

== Finals ==
=== Singles ===
(Haiti) Ronald Agénor defeated (France) Tarik Benhabiles 3–6, 6–4, 6–3

- It was Agénor's 1st singles title of the year and the 2nd of his career.

=== Doubles ===
(Spain) Tomás Carbonell / (Germany) Udo Riglewski defeated (Italy) Cristiano Caratti / (Italy) Federico Mordegan 7–6, 7–6

- It was Carbonell's 1st doubles title of the year and teh 4th of his career. It was Riglewski's 3rd doubles title of the year and the 8th of his career.
