= 1990 Rado Swiss Open =

- Date: 9–15 July
- Edition: 45th
- Category: World Series
- Draw: 32S / 16D
- Prize money: $275,000
- Surface: Clay / outdoor
- Location: Gstaad, Switzerland

Champions

Singles
- (Argentina) Martín Jaite

Doubles
- (Spain) Sergio Casal / (Spain) Emilio Sánchez
- Suisse Open Gstaad

The 1990 Rado Swiss Open, also known as the Suisse Open Gstaad, was an ATP men's tennis tournament held on outdoor clay courts in Gstaad, Switzerland that was part of the World Series of the 1990 ATP Tour. It was the 45th edition of the tournament and was held from 9 July until 15 July 1990. Third-seeded Martín Jaite won the singles title.

== Finals ==
=== Singles ===
(Argentina) Martín Jaite defeated (Spain) Sergi Bruguera 6–3, 6–7^{(5–7)}, 6–2, 6–2

- It was Jaite's 2nd singles title of the year and the 11th of his career.

=== Doubles ===
(Spain) Sergio Casal / (Spain) Emilio Sánchez defeated (Italy) Omar Camporese / (Spain) Javier Sánchez 6–3, 3–6, 7–5

- It was Casal's 4th doubles title of the year and the 28th of his career. It was Sánchez' 5th doubles title of the year and the 31st of his career.
