= 1990 Casablanca Open =

- Date: 5–12 March
- Edition: 7th
- Category: ATP World Series
- Draw: 32S / 16D
- Prize money: $125,000
- Surface: Clay / outdoor
- Location: Casablanca, Morocco

Champions

Singles
- (Austria) Thomas Muster

Doubles
- (Australia) Todd Woodbridge / (Australia) Simon Youl
- Casablanca Open

The 1990 Casablanca Open was a tennis tournament played on outdoor clay courts in Casablanca, Morocco and was part of the ATP International Series of the 1990 ATP Tour. It was the 7th edition of the tournament and was held from March 5 to March 12.

The top three seeds at the tournament were Argentine Guillermo Pérez Roldán, ranked ATP No. 35, Austrian Thomas Muster, ranked No. 37 and Yugoslav Goran Prpić, ranked No. 42.

== Finals ==
=== Singles ===
(Austria) Thomas Muster defeated (Argentina) Guillermo Pérez Roldán 6–1, 6–7, 6–2

- It was Muster's 2nd title of the year and the 8th of his career.

=== Doubles ===
(Australia) Todd Woodbridge / (Australia) Simon Youl defeated (Netherlands) Paul Haarhuis / (Netherlands) Mark Koevermans 6–3, 6–1

- It was Woodbridge's 2nd title of the year and the 2nd of his career. It was Youl's only title of the year and the 2nd of his career.
