= 1990 Stella Artois Indoor =

- Date: 5–11 February
- Edition: 13th
- Category: ATP World Series
- Draw: 32S / 16D
- Prize money: $540,000
- Surface: Carpet / indoor
- Location: Milan, Italy
- Venue: Palatrussardi

Champions

Singles
- (Czechoslovakia) Ivan Lendl

Doubles
- (Italy) Omar Camporese / (Italy) Diego Nargiso
- Milan Indoor

The 1990 Stella Artois Indoor (known as such in 1990 for sponsorship reasons) was a men's tennis tournament played on indoor carpet courts. It was the 13th edition of the tournament, and was part of the ATP World Series of the 1990 ATP Tour. It took place at the Palatrussardi in Milan, Italy, from 5 February until 11 February 1990. First-seeded Ivan Lendl won the singles title, his third at the event after 1983 and 1986.

== Finals ==
=== Singles ===
(Czechoslovakia) Ivan Lendl defeated (United States) Tim Mayotte, 6–3, 6–2

- It was Lendl's 2nd singles title of the year and the 85th of his career.

=== Doubles ===
(Italy) Omar Camporese / (Italy) Diego Nargiso defeated (Netherlands) Tom Nijssen / (West Germany) Udo Riglewski, 6–4, 6–4

- It was Camporese's first doubles title of the year, and of his career.
- It was Nargiso's first doubles title of the year, and of his career.
