= 1990 Diet Pepsi Championships =

Tennis tournament

- Date: 5–11 November
- Edition: 15th
- Category: ATP World Series
- Draw: 32S / 16D
- Prize money: $297,500
- Surface: Carpet / indoor
- Location: London, England
- Venue: Wembley Arena

Champions

Singles
- (Switzerland) Jakob Hlasek

Doubles
- (United States) Jim Grabb / (United States) Patrick McEnroe
- Wembley Championships

The 1990 Diet Pepsi Championships was a men's tennis tournament played on indoor carpet courts at the Wembley Arena in London, England. It was part of the 1990 ATP Tour. It was the 15th and last edition of the tournament and was held from 5 November until 11 November 1990. Seventh-seeded Jakob Hlasek won the singles title.

== Finals ==
=== Singles ===
(Switzerland) Jakob Hlasek defeated (United States) Michael Chang, 7–6, 6–3

- It was Hlasek's 1st singles title of the year and the 4th of his career.

=== Doubles ===
(United States) Jim Grabb / (United States) Patrick McEnroe defeated (United States) Rick Leach / (United States) Jim Pugh, 7–6, 4–6, 6–3

- It was Grabb's single title of the year and the 6th of his career. It was McEnroe's single title of the year and the 5th of his career.
