= 1990 Rado Swiss Open – Doubles =

Doubles
- 1990 Rado Swiss Open

Final
- Champions: (Spain) Sergio Casal (Spain) Emilio Sánchez
- Runners-up: (Italy) Omar Camporese (Spain) Javier Sánchez
- Score: 6–3, 3–6, 7–5

Details
- Draw: 16 (1Q)
- Seeds: 4

Events
Singles	Doubles
- Swiss Open

Cássio Motta and Todd Witsken were the defending champions, but Witsken did not compete this year. Motta teamed up with Martín Jaite and lost in the first round to Charles Beckman and Luke Jensen.

Sergio Casal and Emilio Sánchez won the title by defeating Omar Camporese and Javier Sánchez 6–3, 3–6, 7–5 in the final.

== Seeds ==
1. (Spain) Sergio Casal / (Spain) Emilio Sánchez (champions)
2. (Italy) Omar Camporese / (Spain) Javier Sánchez (final)
3. (United States) Charles Beckman / (United States) Luke Jensen (semifinals)
4. (Argentina) Gustavo Luza / (Denmark) Michael Mortensen (quarterfinals)

== Draw ==
Key

- Q = Qualifier
- WC = Wild card
- LL = Lucky loser
- Alt = Alternate
- ITF = ITF entry
- PR = Protected ranking
- SR = Special ranking
- SE = Special exempt
- JE = Junior exempt
- JR = Junior Accelerator Programme entrant
- CO = College Accelerator Programme entrant
- NG = Next Gen Accelerator Program entrant
- w/o = Walkover
- r = Retired
- d = Defaulted

=== Draw ===
First round
1	(Spain) S Casal (Spain) E Sánchez	6	6
(Ecuador) A Gómez (Argentina) A Mancini	4	4
(Switzerland) H Günthardt (Switzerland) M Rosset	4	7	6
(Spain) T Carbonell (Italy) U Colombini	6	6	1
3	(United States) C Beckman (United States) L Jensen	6	6
(Argentina) M Jaite (Brazil) C Motta	3	4
Q	(Italy) C Brandi (Italy) S Pescosolido	6	7
(Spain) J Clavet (Italy) F Mordegan	3	5
(Czechoslovakia) J Čihák (Czechoslovakia) C Suk	3	6
(Argentina) H de la Peña (Brazil) L Mattar	6	7
(Czechoslovakia) K Nováček (Czechoslovakia) M Šrejber	6	3
4	(Argentina) G Luza (Denmark) M Mortensen	7	6
(Spain) S Bruguera (United States) J Courier	6	1	7
(Australia) W Masur (United States) D Wheaton	4	6	5
(Nigeria) N Odizor (Austria) H Skoff	2	6
2	(Italy) O Camporese (Spain) J Sánchez	6	7

Quarterfinals
1	(Spain) S Casal (Spain) E Sánchez	7	6
(Switzerland) H Günthardt (Switzerland) M Rosset	6	3
3	(United States) C Beckman (United States) L Jensen	7	6	7
Q	(Italy) C Brandi (Italy) S Pescosolido	6	7	6
(Argentina) H de la Peña (Brazil) L Mattar	7	6
4	(Argentina) G Luza (Denmark) M Mortensen	6	3
(Spain) S Bruguera (United States) J Courier	7	3	4
2	(Italy) O Camporese (Spain) J Sánchez	6	6	6

Semifinals
1	(Spain) S Casal (Spain) E Sánchez	6	6	6
3	(United States) C Beckman (United States) L Jensen	7	4	3
(Argentina) H de la Peña (Brazil) L Mattar	4	6	3
2	(Italy) O Camporese (Spain) J Sánchez	6	3	6

Final
1	(Spain) S Casal (Spain) E Sánchez	6	3	7
2	(Italy) O Camporese (Spain) J Sánchez	3	6	5
