= 1990 Casablanca Open – Singles =

Singles
- 1990 Casablanca Open

Final
- Champion: (Austria) Thomas Muster
- Runner-up: (Argentina) Guillermo Pérez Roldán
- Score: 6–1, 6–7^{(3–7)}, 6–2

Details
- Draw: 32
- Seeds: 8

Events
Singles	Doubles
← 1989 ·	Casablanca Open	· 1992 →

Tarik Benhabiles was the defending champion but lost in the second round to Thomas Muster.

Muster won in the final, 6–1, 6–7^{(3–7)}, 6–2, against Guillermo Pérez Roldán.

== Seeds ==
1. (Argentina) Guillermo Pérez Roldán (final)
2. (Austria) Thomas Muster (champion)
3. (Socialist Federal Republic of Yugoslavia) Goran Prpić (semifinals)
4. (Czechoslovakia) Martin Střelba (first round)
5. (Netherlands) Paul Haarhuis (first round)
6. (Spain) Tomás Carbonell (semifinals)
7. (Netherlands) Mark Koevermans (quarterfinals)
8. (Argentina) Franco Davín (second round)

== Draw ==
=== Key ===
- Q = Qualifier
- WC = Wild card
- LL = Lucky loser
- Alt = Alternate
- ITF = ITF entry
- PR = Protected ranking
- SR = Special ranking
- SE = Special exempt
- JE = Junior exempt
- JR = Junior Accelerator Programme entrant
- CO = College Accelerator Programme entrant
- NG = Next Gen Accelerator Program entrant
- w/o = Walkover
- r = Retired
- d = Defaulted

=== Finals ===
Semifinals
1	(Argentina) Guillermo Pérez Roldán	6	6
6	(Spain) Tomás Carbonell	1	1
3	(Socialist Federal Republic of Yugoslavia) Goran Prpić	1	3
2	(Austria) Thomas Muster	6	6

Final
1	(Argentina) Guillermo Pérez Roldán	1	7^{7}	2
2	(Austria) Thomas Muster	6	6^{3}	6

=== Top half ===
First round
1	(Argentina) G Pérez Roldán	7^{7}	6
Q	(Australia) T Woodbridge	6^{3}	1
(Australia) R Fromberg	6	4	6
Q	(Sweden) M Larsson	2	6	2
(Sweden) N Kulti	5	0
(France) T Tulasne	7	6
(Australia) S Youl	2	1
8	(Argentina) F Davín	6	6
4	(Czechoslovakia) M Střelba	1	0
(Spain) F Luna	6	6
(Sweden) L Jönsson	3	5
(Argentina) R Azar	6	7
(Canada) M Wostenholme	6	6
WC	(Morocco) K Outaleb	4	4
(Spain) F Roig	4	2
6	(Spain) T Carbonell	6	6

Second round
1	(Argentina) G Pérez Roldán	3	6	6
(Australia) R Fromberg	6	3	3
(France) T Tulasne	6	6
8	(Argentina) F Davín	3	2
(Spain) F Luna	3	6^{3}
(Argentina) R Azar	6	7^{7}
(Canada) M Wostenholme	1	4
6	(Spain) T Carbonell	6	6

Quarterfinals
1	(Argentina) G Pérez Roldán	6	7
(France) T Tulasne	2	5
(Argentina) R Azar	5	6	3
6	(Spain) T Carbonell	7	2	6

Semifinals
1	(Argentina) G Pérez Roldán	6	6
6	(Spain) T Carbonell	1	1

=== Bottom half ===
First round
5	(Netherlands) P Haarhuis	6	2	3
Q	(Sweden) N Utgren	1	6	6
WC	(Morocco) K Alami	4	5
(Australia) J Anderson	6	7
Q	(France) T Champion	6	6
(Australia) J Stoltenberg	3	2
WC	(Morocco) Y El Aynaoui	2	6^{7}
3	(Socialist Federal Republic of Yugoslavia) G Prpić	6	7^{9}
7	(Netherlands) M Koevermans	6	6
(Italy) S Colombo	1	4
(Czechoslovakia) M Vajda	6	6
(Spain) J F Altur	3	2
(France) T Benhabiles	6	6
(Mexico) L Lavalle	0	2
(Soviet Union) A Võsand	2	5
2	(Austria) T Muster	6	7

Second round
Q	(Sweden) N Utgren	6	4	3
(Australia) J Anderson	0	6	6
Q	(France) T Champion	5	6^{6}
3	(Socialist Federal Republic of Yugoslavia) G Prpić	7	7^{8}
7	(Netherlands) M Koevermans	6	1	6
(Czechoslovakia) M Vajda	1	6	3
(France) T Benhabiles	6	1	2
2	(Austria) T Muster	4	6	6

Quarterfinals
(Australia) J Anderson	3	1
3	(Socialist Federal Republic of Yugoslavia) G Prpić	6	6
7	(Netherlands) M Koevermans	4	6^{4}
2	(Austria) T Muster	6	7^{7}

Semifinals
3	(Socialist Federal Republic of Yugoslavia) G Prpić	1	3
2	(Austria) T Muster	6	6
