= 1990 Rosmalen Grass Court Championships =

- Date: 11–17 June
- Edition: 1st
- Category: ATP World Series
- Draw: 32S / 16D
- Prize money: $225,000
- Surface: Grass / outdoor
- Location: Rosmalen, Netherlands

Champions

Singles
- (Israel) Amos Mansdorf

Doubles
- (Switzerland) Jakob Hlasek / (Germany) Michael Stich
- Rosmalen Grass Court Championships

The 1990 Continental Grass Court Championships was a men's ATP-tennis tournament held in Rosmalen, Netherlands. It was played on outdoor grass courts and was part of the ATP World Series. It was the inaugural edition of the tournament and was held from 11 June through 17 June 1990. Unseeded Amos Mansdorf won the singles title.

== Finals ==
=== Singles ===
(Israel) Amos Mansdorf defeated (Soviet Union) Alexander Volkov 6–3, 7–6

- It was Mansdorf's only singles title of the year and the 5th of his career.

=== Doubles ===
(Switzerland) Jakob Hlasek / (Germany) Michael Stich defeated (United States) Jim Grabb / (United States) Patrick McEnroe 7–6, 6–3
