= 1990 Rado Swiss Open – Singles =

Singles
- 1990 Rado Swiss Open

Final
- Champion: (Argentina) Martín Jaite
- Runner-up: (Spain) Sergi Bruguera
- Score: 6–3, 6–7^{(5–7)}, 6–2, 6–2

Details
- Draw: 32 (3WC/4Q)
- Seeds: 8

Events
| Singles | Doubles |
- Swiss Open

Carl-Uwe Steeb was the defending champion, but lost in the quarterfinals to Ronald Agénor.

Martín Jaite won the title by defeating Sergi Bruguera 6–3, 6–7^{(5–7)}, 6–2, 6–2 in the final.

== Seeds ==
1. (Ecuador) Andrés Gómez (second round)
2. (Spain) Emilio Sánchez (quarterfinals)
3. (Argentina) Martín Jaite (champion)
4. (Soviet Union) Andrei Chesnokov (quarterfinals)
5. (United States) Jim Courier (quarterfinals)
6. (Spain) Juan Aguilera (second round)
7. (Germany) Carl-Uwe Steeb (quarterfinals)
8. (Switzerland) Marc Rosset (semifinals)

== Draw ==
Key

- Q = Qualifier
- WC = Wild card
- LL = Lucky loser
- Alt = Alternate
- ITF = ITF entry
- PR = Protected ranking
- SR = Special ranking
- SE = Special exempt
- JE = Junior exempt
- JR = Junior Accelerator Programme entrant
- CO = College Accelerator Programme entrant
- NG = Next Gen Accelerator Program entrant
- w/o = Walkover
- r = Retired
- d = Defaulted

=== Finals ===
Semifinals
(Haiti) Ronald Agénor | 5 | 1
3 | (Argentina) Martín Jaite | 7 | 6
(Spain) Sergi Bruguera | 6 | 7
8 | (Switzerland) Marc Rosset | 3 | 5

Final
3 | (Argentina) Martín Jaite | 6 | 6^{5} | 6 | 6
(Spain) Sergi Bruguera | 3 | 7^{7} | 2 | 2

=== Top half ===
First round
1 | (Ecuador) A Gómez | 1 | 6 | 6
Q | (Italy) S Pescosolido | 6 | 1 | 3
(Canada) M Wostenholme | 4 | 7 | 3
(Haiti) R Agénor | 6 | 6 | 6
WC | (Italy) O Camporese | 2 | 3
(Czechoslovakia) M Šrejber | 6 | 6
(Spain) J Sánchez | 2 | 4
7 | (Germany) CU Steeb | 6 | 6
3 | (Argentina) M Jaite | 7 | 6
(Germany) M Zoecke | 5 | 4
Q | (Socialist Federal Republic of Yugoslavia) M Ostoja | 6 | 4 | 5
(Brazil) C Motta | 2 | 6 | 7
WC | (Sweden) C Bergström | 4 | 3
(Austria) H Skoff | 6 | 6
(France) T Benhabiles | 5 | r
5 | (United States) J Courier | 7

Second round
1 | (Ecuador) A Gómez | 6 | 5 | 3
(Haiti) R Agénor | 1 | 7 | 6
(Czechoslovakia) M Šrejber | 6 | 3 | 4
7 | (Germany) CU Steeb | 3 | 6 | 6
3 | (Argentina) M Jaite | 7 | 6
(Brazil) C Motta | 6 | 1
(Austria) H Skoff | 3 | 3
5 | (United States) J Courier | 6 | 6

Quarterfinals
(Haiti) R Agénor | 3 | 6 | 6
7 | (Germany) CU Steeb | 6 | 2 | 2
3 | (Argentina) M Jaite | 3 | 7 | 6
5 | (United States) J Courier | 6 | 6 | 4

Semifinals
(Haiti) R Agénor | 5 | 1
3 | (Argentina) M Jaite | 7 | 6

=== Bottom half ===
First round
6 | (Spain) J Aguilera | 7 | 2 | 7
Q | (Czechoslovakia) C Suk | 6 | 6 | 5
(Argentina) A Mancini | 3 | 4
(Spain) S Bruguera | 6 | 6
WC | (United States) D Wheaton | 2 | 4
(Spain) T Carbonell | 6 | 6
(Soviet Union) A Cherkasov | 3 | 6
4 | (Soviet Union) A Chesnokov | 6 | 7
8 | (Switzerland) M Rosset | 7 | 5 | 6
(Czechoslovakia) K Nováček | 6 | 7 | 2
Q | (Argentina) H de la Peña | 6 | 4
(Australia) W Masur | 7 | 6
(Brazil) L Mattar | 5 | 4
(Spain) J Arrese | 7 | 6
(United States) J Arias | 3 | 4
2 | (Spain) E Sánchez | 6 | 6

Second round
6 | (Spain) J Aguilera | 3 | 4
(Spain) S Bruguera | 6 | 6
(Spain) T Carbonell | 5 | 3
4 | (Soviet Union) A Chesnokov | 7 | 6
8 | (Switzerland) M Rosset | 6 | 5 | 7
(Australia) W Masur | 4 | 7 | 6
(Spain) J Arrese | 3 | 2
2 | (Spain) E Sánchez | 6 | 6

Quarterfinals
(Spain) S Bruguera | 6 | 6
4 | (Soviet Union) A Chesnokov | 2 | 3
8 | (Switzerland) M Rosset | 6 | 3 | 6
2 | (Spain) E Sánchez | 4 | 6 | 3

Semifinals
(Spain) S Bruguera | 6 | 7
8 | (Switzerland) M Rosset | 3 | 5
