= 1990 Diet Pepsi Championships – Singles =

Singles
- 1990 Diet Pepsi Championships

Final
- Champion: (Switzerland) Jakob Hlasek
- Runner-up: (United States) Michael Chang
- Score: 7–6, 6–3

Details
- Draw: 16
- Seeds: 8

Events
Singles	Doubles
- Wembley Championships

The 1990 Diet Pepsi Championships was a tennis tournament played on indoor carpet courts at the Wembley Arena in Wembley, London in the United Kingdom. Michael Chang was the defending champion, but he lost the final to Jakob Hlasek, 7–6, 6–3.

== Seeds ==
1. (United States) Pete Sampras (second round, withdrew)
2. (Socialist Federal Republic of Yugoslavia) Goran Ivanišević (quarterfinals)
3. (United States) Michael Chang (Runner up)
4. (France) Guy Forget (first round)
5. (United States) Aaron Krickstein (second round)
6. (Austria) Horst Skoff (second round)
7. (Switzerland) Jakob Hlasek (champion)
8. (United States) Scott Davis (second round)

== Draw ==
Key

- Q = Qualifier
- WC = Wild card
- LL = Lucky loser
- Alt = Alternate
- ITF = ITF entry
- PR = Protected ranking
- SR = Special ranking
- SE = Special exempt
- JE = Junior exempt
- JR = Junior Accelerator Programme entrant
- CO = College Accelerator Programme entrant
- NG = Next Gen Accelerator Program entrant
- w/o = Walkover
- r = Retired
- d = Defaulted

=== Finals ===
Semifinals
(Sweden) C Bergström	3	6	6
3	(United States) M Chang	6	3	7
Q	(Italy) D Nargiso	6	2
7	(Switzerland) J Hlasek	7	6

Final
3	(United States) M Chang	6	3
7	(Switzerland) J Hlasek	7	6

=== Top half ===
First round
1	(United States) P Sampras	6	4	6
LL	(France) C Pioline	2	6	3
LL	(Belgium) E Masso	4	4
(Sweden) C Bergström	6	6
Q	(United States) P McEnroe	6	7
(United States) J Grabb	2	5
(Austria) A Antonitsch	3	6	4
8	(United States) S Davis	6	4	6
3	(United States) M Chang	6	6
(Australia) M Kratzmann	0	0
WC	(United Kingdom) J Bates	7	7
(India) R Krishnan	6	6
(Sweden) P Lundgren	6	6	6
WC	(Venezuela) N Pereira	7	3	4
Q	(United States) R Leach	2	4
5	(United States) A Krickstein	6	6

Second round
1	(United States) P Sampras
(Sweden) C Bergström	w/o
Q	(United States) P McEnroe	7	3	6
(United States) S Davis	5	6	4
3	(United States) M Chang	6	6
WC	(United Kingdom) J Bates	3	3
(Sweden) P Lundgren	7	6
5	(United States) A Krickstein	5	4

Quarterfinals
(Sweden) C Bergström	6	6
Q	(United States) P McEnroe	2	4
3	(United States) M Chang	3	6	6
(Sweden) P Lundgren	6	3	4

Semifinals
(Sweden) C Bergström	3	6	6
3	(United States) M Chang	6	3	7

=== Bottom half ===
First round
6	(Austria) H Skoff	6	4	2
(Germany) P Baur	3	6	6
Q	(Italy) D Nargiso	6	6
(Finland) A Rahunen	2	4
(Australia) D Cahill	7	6
WC	(Australia) P Cash	6	4
(Sweden) M Larsson	6	7
4	(France) G Forget	2	6
7	(Switzerland) J Hlasek	6	6	6
(Australia) T Woodbridge	1	7	3
(Socialist Federal Republic of Yugoslavia) G Prpić	4	4
(South Africa) G Muller	6	6
(Sweden) N Kulti	6	6
Q	(Australia) M Woodforde	2	1
(France) T Champion	4	2
2	(Socialist Federal Republic of Yugoslavia) G Ivanišević	6	6

Second round
(Germany) P Baur	6	6	6
Q	(Italy) D Nargiso	3	7	7
(Australia) D Cahill	6	6	6
(Sweden) M Larsson	7	3	7
7	(Switzerland) J Hlasek	7	7
(South Africa) G Muller	5	5
(Sweden) N Kulti	6	4
2	(Socialist Federal Republic of Yugoslavia) G Ivanišević	7	6

Quarterfinals
Q	(Italy) D Nargiso	6	3	6
(Sweden) M Larsson	3	6	3
7	(Switzerland) J Hlasek	4
2	(Socialist Federal Republic of Yugoslavia) G Ivanišević	1	r

Semifinals
Q	(Italy) D Nargiso	6	2
7	(Switzerland) J Hlasek	7	6
