= 1990 Rosmalen Grass Court Championships – Singles =

Singles
- 1990 Rosmalen Grass Court Championships

Final
- Champion: (Israel) Amos Mansdorf
- Runner-up: (Soviet Union) Alexander Volkov
- Score: 6–3, 7–6

Details
- Draw: 32 (2WC/4Q/1LL)
- Seeds: 8

Events
Singles	Doubles
Rosmalen Grass Court Championships	· 1991 →

In the inaugural edition of the tournament, Amos Mansdorf won the title after defeating Alexander Volkov 6–3, 7–6 in the final.

== Seeds ==
1. (France) Yannick Noah (first round)
2. (Czechoslovakia) Karel Nováček (first round)
3. (Switzerland) Jakob Hlasek (second round)
4. (Netherlands) Paul Haarhuis (first round)
5. (United States) Richey Reneberg (semifinals)
6. (United States) Jim Grabb (second round)
7. (n/a)
8. (United States) Dan Goldie (second round)

== Draw ==
=== Key ===
- Q = Qualifier
- WC = Wild card
- LL = Lucky loser
- Alt = Alternate
- SE = Special exempt
- PR = Protected ranking
- ITF = ITF entry
- JE = Junior exempt
- w/o = Walkover
- r = Retired
- d = Defaulted
- SR = Special ranking

=== Finals ===
Semifinals
(Israel) Amos Mansdorf	6	6
5	(United States) Richey Reneberg	4	4
(Soviet Union) Alexander Volkov	6	4	6
Q	(United States) Patrick McEnroe	3	6	3

Final
(Israel) Amos Mansdorf	6	7
(Soviet Union) Alexander Volkov	3	6

=== Top half ===
First round
1	(France) Y Noah	3	3
(Czechoslovakia) M Šrejber	6	6
(Netherlands) M Schapers	4	5
Q	(Sweden) H Holm	6	7
(New Zealand) K Evernden	4	3
(Israel) A Mansdorf	6	6
(Netherlands) T Nijssen	5	1
8	(United States) D Goldie	7	6
4	(Netherlands) P Haarhuis	6	6
(Sweden) D Engel	7	7
(Puerto Rico) M Nido	4	2
(United States) J Tarango	6	6
(Czechoslovakia) M Mečíř	3	2
(West Germany) M Stich	6	6
(Australia) M Woodforde	2	4
5	(United States) R Reneberg	6	6

Second round
(Czechoslovakia) M Šrejber	4	4
Q	(Sweden) H Holm	6	6
(Israel) A Mansdorf	7	1	7
8	(United States) D Goldie	6	6	6
(Sweden) D Engel	6	6
(United States) J Tarango	1	2
(West Germany) M Stich	7	3	3
5	(United States) R Reneberg	5	6	6

Quarterfinals
Q	(Sweden) H Holm	3	4
(Israel) A Mansdorf	6	6
(Sweden) D Engel	6	4
5	(United States) R Reneberg	7	6

Semifinals
(Israel) A Mansdorf	6	6
5	(United States) R Reneberg	4	4

=== Bottom half ===
First round
6	(United States) J Grabb	7	4	6
Q	(Netherlands) J Eltingh	6	6	4
(Soviet Union) A Volkov	6	6
(France) O Delaître	2	1
(West Germany) C Saceanu	4	4
(United States) G Layendecker	6	6
LL	(Nigeria) N Odizor	4	7	2
3	(Switzerland) J Hlasek	6	6	6
Q	(United States) P McEnroe	6	6
WC	(Netherlands) T Kempers	0	3
WC	(Netherlands) J Siemerink	6	6
(Sweden) L Jönsson	1	4
(Sweden) T Högstedt	6	6
Q	(United States) B Garnett	7	7
(United States) R Weiss	6	7
2	(Czech Republic) K Nováček	3	6

Second round
6	(United States) J Grabb	3	6	6
(Soviet Union) A Volkov	6	4	7
(United States) G Layendecker	7	7
3	(Switzerland) J Hlasek	5	5
Q	(United States) P McEnroe	6	6
WC	(Netherlands) J Siemerink	2	3
Q	(United States) B Garnett	6	4
(United States) R Weiss	7	6

Quarterfinals
(Soviet Union) A Volkov	6	6
(United States) G Layendecker	3	4
Q	(United States) P McEnroe	6	6
(United States) R Weiss	3	4

Semifinals
(Soviet Union) A Volkov	6	4	6
Q	(United States) P McEnroe	3	6	3
