= 1990 Casablanca Open – Doubles =

Doubles
- 1990 Casablanca Open

Final
- Champions: (Australia) Todd Woodbridge (Australia) Simon Youl
- Runners-up: (Netherlands) Paul Haarhuis (Netherlands) Mark Koevermans
- Score: 6–3, 6–1

Details
- Draw: 16
- Seeds: 4

Events
Singles	Doubles
← 1989 ·	Casablanca Open	· 1992 →

Jaroslav Bulant and Richard Vogel were the defending champions, having won the last edition held as a Challenger tournament. They did not participate in 1990.
Todd Woodbridge and Simon Youl won the title, defeating Paul Haarhuis and Mark Koevermans 6–3, 6–1, in the final.

== Seeds ==
1. (Spain) Tomás Carbonell / (Spain) Carlos Costa (quarterfinals)
2. (Czechoslovakia) Josef Čihák / (Czechoslovakia) Cyril Suk (quarterfinals)
3. (Netherlands) Paul Haarhuis / (Netherlands) Mark Koevermans (final)
4. (Sweden) Per Henricsson / (Sweden) Nicklas Utgren (quarterfinals)

== Draw ==
=== Key ===
- Q = Qualifier
- WC = Wild card
- LL = Lucky loser
- Alt = Alternate
- ITF = ITF entry
- PR = Protected ranking
- SR = Special ranking
- SE = Special exempt
- JE = Junior exempt
- JR = Junior Accelerator Programme entrant
- CO = College Accelerator Programme entrant
- NG = Next Gen Accelerator Program entrant
- w/o = Walkover
- r = Retired
- d = Defaulted

=== Draw ===
First round
1	(Spain) T Carbonell (Spain) C Costa	4	6	6
(West Germany) R Osterthun (Argentina) G Pérez Roldán	6	2	3
Q	(Spain) M-A Gorriz-Bonhora (Czechoslovakia) L Pimek	6	3	6
(Brazil) J Cunha e Silva (Belgium) E Masso	4	6	4
3	(Netherlands) P Haarhuis (Netherlands) M Koevermans	6	6
(Sweden) T Nydahl (Sweden) P Svensson	2	3
(Czechoslovakia) D Rikl (Czechoslovakia) T Anzari	6	3	6
(Morocco) K Alami (Morocco) K Outaleb	2	6	1
(Italy) M Cierro (Italy) S Colombo	6	6
(Romania) F Segărceanu (Czechoslovakia) M Vajda	4	4
(Venezuela) A Mora (United States) J Schor	3	4
4	(Sweden) P Henricsson (Sweden) N Utgren	6	6
(Australia) T Woodbridge (Australia) S Youl	6	6
(Spain) JC Báguena (Spain) B Uribe	1	2
(Italy) A de Minicis (Italy) C Miniussi	6^{6}	2
2	(Czechoslovakia) J Čihák (Czechoslovakia) C Suk	7^{8}	6

Quarterfinals
1	(Spain) T Carbonell (Spain) C Costa	4	4
(Spain) M-A Gorriz-Bonhora (Czechoslovakia) L Pimek	6	6
3	(Netherlands) P Haarhuis (Netherlands) M Koevermans	6	6
(Czechoslovakia) D Rikl (Czechoslovakia) T Anzari	3	4
(Italy) M Cierro (Italy) S Colombo	6^{4}	6	7
4	(Sweden) P Henricsson (Sweden) N Utgren	7^{7}	1	5
(Australia) T Woodbridge (Australia) S Youl	6	6
2	(Czechoslovakia) J Čihák (Czechoslovakia) C Suk	1	4

Semifinals
(Spain) M-A Gorriz-Bonhora (Czechoslovakia) L Pimek	7^{7}	5	1
3	(Netherlands) P Haarhuis (Netherlands) M Koevermans	6^{5}	7	6
(Italy) M Cierro (Italy) S Colombo	3	2
(Australia) T Woodbridge (Australia) S Youl	6	6

Final
3	(Netherlands) P Haarhuis (Netherlands) M Koevermans	3	1
(Australia) T Woodbridge (Australia) S Youl	6	6
