= 1990 Diet Pepsi Championships – Doubles =

Doubles
- 1990 Diet Pepsi Championships

Final
- Champions: (United States) Jim Grabb (United States) Patrick McEnroe
- Runners-up: (United States) Rick Leach (United States) Jim Pugh
- Score: 7–6, 4–6, 6–3

Details
- Draw: 16
- Seeds: 4

Events
| Singles | Doubles |
- Wembley Championships

Jakob Hlasek and John McEnroe were the defending champions but this time Hlasek played in pair with Frenchman Guy Forget and lost in the second round to Australians Mark Woodforde and Todd Woodbridge.

It was all-American final with Jim Grabb and Patrick McEnroe beating Rick Leach and Jim Pugh, 7–6, 4–6, 6–3.

== Seeds ==
Text in italics indicates the round in which the seeded pairs were eliminated.

1. (United States) Rick Leach / (United States) Jim Pugh (runners-up)
2. (France) Guy Forget / (Switzerland) Jakob Hlasek (quarterfinal)
3. (Canada) Grant Connell / (Canada) Glenn Michibata (quarterfinal)
4. none

== Draw ==
Key

- Q = Qualifier
- WC = Wild card
- LL = Lucky loser
- Alt = Alternate
- ITF = ITF entry
- PR = Protected ranking
- SR = Special ranking
- SE = Special exempt
- JE = Junior exempt
- JR = Junior Accelerator Programme entrant
- CO = College Accelerator Programme entrant
- NG = Next Gen Accelerator Program entrant
- w/o = Walkover
- r = Retired
- d = Defaulted

First round
1 | (United States) R Leach (United States) J Pugh | 6 | 6
(Austria) A Antonitsch (Denmark) M Mortensen | 4 | 4
(United States) S DeVries (Australia) D Macpherson | 7 | 6
(United Kingdom) N Broad (South Africa) G Muller | 6 | 3
3 | (Canada) G Connell (Canada) G Michibata | 6 | 6
(United Kingdom) M Petchey (United Kingdom) D Sapsford | 0 | 3
(Sweden) P Lundgren (Venezuela) N Pereira | 7 | 7
(United States) P Annacone (South Africa) Ch van Rensburg | 5 | 6
(United Kingdom) N Brown (United Kingdom) A Castle | 6 | 6
(Spain) JC Báguena (Australia) N Borwick | 2 | 4
(United States) J Grabb (United States) P McEnroe | 6 | 6
(Sweden) N Kulti (Sweden) M Larsson | 3 | 3
(Australia) M Woodforde (Australia) T Woodbridge | 6 | 7
(Belgium) L Pimek (Czechoslovakia) T Šmid | 4 | 6
(United Kingdom) J Bates (Australia) P Cash | 5 | 6 | 4
2 | (France) G Forget (Switzerland) J Hlasek | 7 | 3 | 6

Quarterfinals
1 | (United States) R Leach (United States) J Pugh | 6 | 6
(United States) S DeVries (Australia) D Macpherson | 1 | 3
3 | (Canada) G Connell (Canada) G Michibata | 6 | 7 | 5
(Sweden) P Lundgren (Venezuela) N Pereira | '7 | 5 | 7
(United Kingdom) N Brown (United Kingdom) A Castle | 3 | 1
(United States) J Grabb (United States) P McEnroe | 6 | 6
(Australia) M Woodforde (Australia) T Woodbridge | 6 | 7
2 | (France) G Forget (Switzerland) J Hlasek | 3 | 6

Semifinals
1 | (United States) R Leach (United States) J Pugh | 6 | 6
(Sweden) P Lundgren (Venezuela) N Pereira | 2 | 3
(United States) J Grabb (United States) P McEnroe | 6 | 6
(Australia) M Woodforde (Australia) T Woodbridge | 4 | 3

Final
1 | (United States) R Leach (United States) J Pugh | 6 | 6 | 3
(United States) J Grabb (United States) P McEnroe | 7 | 4 | 6
