= 1990 Stella Artois Indoor – Singles =

Singles
- 1990 Stella Artois Indoor
- 1989 Champion: (West Germany) Boris Becker

Final
- Champion: (Czechoslovakia) Ivan Lendl
- Runner-up: (United States) Tim Mayotte
- Score: 6–3, 6–2

Details
- Draw: 32
- Seeds: 8

Events
Singles	Doubles
- Stella Artois Indoor

Boris Becker was the defending champion, but did not take part that year.
Ivan Lendl won the title, defeating Tim Mayotte 6–3, 6–2, in the final.

== Seeds ==
1. (Czechoslovakia) Ivan Lendl (champion)
2. (United States) John McEnroe (semifinals)
3. (United States) Aaron Krickstein (second round)
4. (France) Yannick Noah (first round)
5. (United States) Tim Mayotte (final)
6. (United States) Jimmy Connors (first round)
7. (withdrew)
8. (United States) Jim Courier (quarterfinals)

== Draw ==
Key

- Q = Qualifier
- WC = Wild card
- LL = Lucky loser
- Alt = Alternate
- ITF = ITF entry
- PR = Protected ranking
- SR = Special ranking
- SE = Special exempt
- JE = Junior exempt
- JR = Junior Accelerator Programme entrant
- CO = College Accelerator Programme entrant
- NG = Next Gen Accelerator Program entrant
- w/o = Walkover
- r = Retired
- d = Defaulted

=== Finals ===
Semifinals
1	(Czechoslovakia) Ivan Lendl	3	6	6
(United States) Pete Sampras	6	0	3
5	(United States) Tim Mayotte	6	6
2	(United States) John McEnroe	4	4

Final
1	(Czechoslovakia) Ivan Lendl	6	6
5	(United States) Tim Mayotte	3	2

=== Top half ===
First round
1	(Czechoslovakia) I Lendl	6	6
WC	(Italy) D Nargiso	3	3
(Soviet Union) A Volkov	6	6
Q	(Italy) S Colombo	1	4
(France) J Potier	4	4
(Czechoslovakia) K Nováček	6	6
(Netherlands) M Koevermans	2	1
8	(United States) J Courier	6	6
3	(United States) A Krickstein	6	6
(Italy) O Camporese	4	3
WC	(Italy) S Pescosolido	5	2
(Czechoslovakia) M Šrejber	7	6
(Sweden) A Järryd	1	3
(United States) P Sampras	6	6
Q	(West Germany) M Zoecke	6	4	7^{7}
6	(United States) J Connors	3	6	6^{1}

Second round
1	(Czechoslovakia) I Lendl	6	2	6
(Soviet Union) A Volkov	1	6	1
(Czechoslovakia) K Nováček	4	4
8	(United States) J Courier	6	6
3	(United States) A Krickstein	2	3
(Czechoslovakia) M Šrejber	6	6
(United States) P Sampras	6	7^{7}
Q	(West Germany) M Zoecke	1	6^{4}

Quarterfinals
1	(Czechoslovakia) I Lendl	6	6
8	(United States) J Courier	2	4
(Czechoslovakia) M Šrejber	7^{9}	4	4
(United States) P Sampras	6^{7}	6	6

Semifinals
1	(Czechoslovakia) I Lendl	3	6	6
(United States) P Sampras	6	0	3

=== Bottom half ===
First round
5	(United States) T Mayotte	6	6
(Czechoslovakia) M Střelba	1	1
Q	(France) T Champion	6	7^{7}
(Czechoslovakia) P Korda	4	6^{1}
(Sweden) P Lundgren	6^{6}	5
(Switzerland) J Hlasek	7^{8}	7
(United Kingdom) J Bates	7	6
4/WC	(France) Y Noah	5	4
(Austria) H Skoff	6	6
Q	(Italy) P Pambianco	2	2
(Netherlands) P Haarhuis	4	2
(West Germany) E Jelen	6	6
(Socialist Federal Republic of Yugoslavia) B Orešar	6^{3}	4
(Italy) P Canè	7^{7}	6
(Soviet Union) A Cherkasov	1	6	4
2	(United States) J McEnroe	6	4	6

Second round
5	(United States) T Mayotte	6	6
Q	(France) T Champion	2	1
(Switzerland) J Hlasek	6	3	6
(United Kingdom) J Bates	3	6	3
(Austria) H Skoff	6^{5}	5^{r}
(West Germany) E Jelen	7^{7}	4
(Italy) P Canè	4	1
2	(United States) J McEnroe	6	6

Quarterfinals
5	(United States) T Mayotte	7	6^{2}	7
(Switzerland) J Hlasek	5	7^{7}	5
(West Germany) E Jelen	3	3
2	(United States) J McEnroe	6	6

Semifinals
5	(United States) T Mayotte	6	6
2	(United States) J McEnroe	4	4
