= 1990 Stella Artois Indoor – Doubles =

Doubles
- 1990 Stella Artois Indoor

Final
- Champions: (Italy) Omar Camporese (Italy) Diego Nargiso
- Runners-up: (Netherlands) Tom Nijssen (West Germany) Udo Riglewski
- Score: 6–4, 6–4

Details
- Draw: 16
- Seeds: 4

Events
Singles	Doubles
- Stella Artois Indoor

Jakob Hlasek and John McEnroe were the defending champions, but lost in the quarterfinals.
Omar Camporese and Diego Nargiso won the title, defeating Tom Nijssen and Udo Riglewski 6–4, 6–4, in the final.

== Seeds ==
1. (Switzerland) Jakob Hlasek / (United States) John McEnroe (quarterfinals)
2. (Sweden) Anders Järryd / (Czechoslovakia) Tomáš Šmíd (first round)
3. (United States) Tim Pawsat / (Australia) Laurie Warder (first round)
4. (United States) Jim Courier / (United States) Pete Sampras (semifinals)

== Draw ==
Key

- Q = Qualifier
- WC = Wild card
- LL = Lucky loser
- Alt = Alternate
- ITF = ITF entry
- PR = Protected ranking
- SR = Special ranking
- SE = Special exempt
- JE = Junior exempt
- JR = Junior Accelerator Programme entrant
- CO = College Accelerator Programme entrant
- NG = Next Gen Accelerator Program entrant
- w/o = Walkover
- r = Retired
- d = Defaulted

=== Draw ===
First round
1	(Switzerland) J Hlasek (United States) J McEnroe	6	6^{6}	6
(United States) C Beckman (United States) L Jensen	3	7^{8}	1
(West Germany) E Jelen (Denmark) M Mortensen	6	6
(Italy) S Colombo (West Germany) R Osterthun	4	4
3	(United States) T Pawsat (Australia) L Warder	2	6	4
(Italy) O Camporese (Italy) D Nargiso	6	2	6
WC	(Czechoslovakia) I Lendl (Czechoslovakia) K Nováček	4	6	6^{3}
(Czechoslovakia) J Čihák (Czechoslovakia) C Suk	6	3	7^{7}
(United Kingdom) J Bates (Australia) B Dyke	2	6	6^{3}
(Czechoslovakia) M Šrejber (Hungary) B Taróczy	6	4	7^{7}
(United States) S Cannon (United States) G Van Emburgh	6	4	5
4	(United States) J Courier (United States) P Sampras	2	6	7
(Socialist Federal Republic of Yugoslavia) G Ivanišević (Czechoslovakia) P Korda	4	2
(Netherlands) P Haarhuis (Netherlands) M Koevermans	6	6
(Netherlands) T Nijssen (West Germany) U Riglewski	6	6
2	(Sweden) A Järryd (Czechoslovakia) T Šmíd	4	2

Quarterfinals
1	(Switzerland) J Hlasek (United States) J McEnroe	4	6^{4}
(West Germany) E Jelen (Denmark) M Mortensen	6	7^{7}
(Italy) O Camporese (Italy) D Nargiso	6	6
(Czechoslovakia) J Čihák (Czechoslovakia) C Suk	4	4
(Czechoslovakia) M Šrejber (Hungary) B Taróczy	7^{8}	5	3
4	(United States) J Courier (United States) P Sampras	6^{6}	7	6
(Netherlands) P Haarhuis (Netherlands) M Koevermans	4	1
(Netherlands) T Nijssen (West Germany) U Riglewski	6	6

Semifinals
(West Germany) E Jelen (Denmark) M Mortensen	3	6^{10}
(Italy) O Camporese (Italy) D Nargiso	6	7^{12}
4	(United States) J Courier (United States) P Sampras	5	4
(Netherlands) T Nijssen (West Germany) U Riglewski	7	6

Final
(Italy) O Camporese (Italy) D Nargiso	6	6
(Netherlands) T Nijssen (West Germany) U Riglewski	4	4
