= 1990 Rosmalen Grass Court Championships – Doubles =

Doubles
- 1990 Rosmalen Grass Court Championships

Final
- Champions: (Switzerland) Jakob Hlasek (West Germany) Michael Stich
- Runners-up: (United States) Jim Grabb (United States) Patrick McEnroe
- Score: 7–6, 6–3

Details
- Draw: 16 (1Q)
- Seeds: 4

Events
| Singles | Doubles |
| Rosmalen Grass Court Championships | · 1991 → |

In the inaugural edition of the tournament, Jakob Hlasek and Michael Stich won the title after defeating Jim Grabb and Patrick McEnroe 7–6, 6–3 in the final.

== Seeds ==
1. (United States) Jim Grabb / (United States) Patrick McEnroe (final)
2. (Switzerland) Jakob Hlasek / (West Germany) Michael Stich (champions)
3. (United States) Glenn Layendecker / (United States) Richey Reneberg (semifinals)
4. (New Zealand) Kelly Evernden / (Netherlands) Tom Nijssen (semifinals)

== Draw ==
=== Key ===
- Q = Qualifier
- WC = Wild card
- LL = Lucky loser
- Alt = Alternate
- SE = Special exempt
- PR = Protected ranking
- ITF = ITF entry
- JE = Junior exempt
- w/o = Walkover
- r = Retired
- d = Defaulted
- SR = Special ranking

=== Draw ===
First round
1 | (United States) J Grabb (United States) P McEnroe | 4 | 6 | 6
Q | (Netherlands) J Eltingh (Netherlands) M Oosting | 6 | 3 | 4
(Czechoslovakia) L Pimek (United States) J Sobel | 6 | 6
(United States) B Garnett (Brazil) M Menezes | 4 | 2
3 | (United States) G Layendecker (United States) R Reneberg | 6 | 7
(United States) G Van Emburgh (Australia) M Woodforde | 3 | 5
(United States) T Nelson (The Bahamas) R Smith | 6 | 7
(Sweden) D Engel (Sweden) V Jansson | 4 | 5
(Nigeria) N Odizor (Kenya) P Wekesa | 6 | 6 | 6
(France) Y Noah (Czechoslovakia) K Nováček | 4 | 7 | 3
(Venezuela) A Mora (United States) B Page | 4 | 7 | 4
4 | (New Zealand) K Evernden (Netherlands) T Nijssen | 6 | 5 | 6
(West Germany) S Saceanu (Czechoslovakia) M Šrejber | 6 | 7
(Netherlands) P Haarhuis (Netherlands) M Schapers | 4 | 6
(West Germany) P Baur (Puerto Rico) M Mido | 3 | 2
2 | (Switzerland) J Hlasek (West Germany) M Stich | 6 | 6

Quarterfinals
1 | (United States) J Grabb (United States) P McEnroe | 6 | 6
(Czechoslovakia) L Pimek (United States) J Sobel | 4 | 4
3 | (United States) G Layendecker (United States) R Reneberg | 6 | 6 | 7
(United States) T Nelson (The Bahamas) R Smith | 4 | 7 | 6
(Nigeria) N Odizor (Kenya) P Wekesa | 6 | 7 | 3
4 | (New Zealand) K Evernden (Netherlands) T Nijssen | 7 | 6 | 6
(West Germany) S Saceanu (Czechoslovakia) M Šrejber | 6 | 6 | 6
2 | (Switzerland) J Hlasek (West Germany) M Stich | 2 | 7 | 7

Semifinals
1 | (United States) J Grabb (United States) P McEnroe | 7 | 6
3 | (United States) G Layendecker (United States) R Reneberg | 6 | 2
4 | (New Zealand) K Evernden (Netherlands) T Nijssen | 7 | 1 | 4
2 | (Switzerland) J Hlasek (West Germany) M Stich | 6 | 6 | 6

Final
1 | (United States) J Grabb (United States) P McEnroe | 6 | 3
2 | (Switzerland) J Hlasek (West Germany) M Stich | 7 | 6
