= 1993 Athens International – Singles =

Singles
- 1993 Athens International

Final
- Champion: (Spain) Jordi Arrese
- Runner-up: (Spain) Alberto Berasategui
- Score: 6–4, 3–6, 6–3

Details
- Draw: 32
- Seeds: 8

Events
Singles	Doubles
← 1992 ·	ATP Athens Open	· 1994 →

Jordi Arrese was the defending champion and successfully defended his title, beating Alberto Berasategui in the final, 6–4, 3–6, 6–3.

== Seeds ==
1. (Spain) Javier Sánchez (semifinals)
2. (Russia) Andrei Cherkasov (second round)
3. (Spain) Alberto Berasategui (final)
4. (Germany) Bernd Karbacher (first round)
5. (Italy) Renzo Furlan (quarterfinals)
6. (Spain) Àlex Corretja (second round)
7. (Argentina) Horacio de la Peña (semifinals)
8. (Italy) Andrea Gaudenzi (quarterfinals, retired)

== Draw ==
=== Key ===
- Q = Qualifier
- WC = Wild card
- LL = Lucky loser
- Alt = Alternate
- SE = Special exempt
- PR = Protected ranking
- ITF = ITF entry
- JE = Junior exempt
- w/o = Walkover
- r = Retired
- d = Defaulted
- SR = Special ranking

=== Finals ===
Semifinals
1	(Spain) Javier Sánchez	3	6	6^{1}
(Spain) Jordi Arrese	6	4	7^{7}
3	(Spain) Alberto Berasategui	6	7
7	(Argentina) Horacio de la Peña	3	5

Final
(Spain) Jordi Arrese	6	3	6
3	(Spain) Alberto Berasategui	4	6	3

=== Top half ===
First round
1	(Spain) J Sánchez	6	7^{7}
(Spain) J Gisbert-Schultze	4	6^{3}
(Spain) JF Altur	3	5
Q	(Hungary) J Krocsko	6	7
(Argentina) R Azar	6^{4}	6	6
WC	(Greece) A Bavelas	7^{7}	1	2
(Czech Republic) D Rikl	2	2
8	(Italy) A Gaudenzi	6	6
4	(Germany) B Karbacher	6	1	2
(Germany) C Arriens	4	6	6
(United States) B Shelton	7^{7}	4	6^{2}
(Spain) J Arrese	6^{4}	6	7^{7}
WC	(Greece) K Efraimoglou	1	1
Q	(United States) F Montana	6	6
(Argentina) F Davín	3	6^{4}
5	(Italy) R Furlan	6	7^{7}

Second round
1	(Spain) J Sánchez	6	6
Q	(Hungary) J Krocsko	2	2
(Argentina) R Azar	1	1
8	(Italy) A Gaudenzi	6	6
(Germany) C Arriens	4	2
(Spain) J Arrese	6	6
Q	(United States) F Montana	1	4
5	(Italy) R Furlan	6	6

Quarterfinals
1	(Spain) J Sánchez	6
8	(Italy) A Gaudenzi	4	r
(Spain) J Arrese	6	7
5	(Italy) R Furlan	4	5

Semifinals
1	(Spain) J Sánchez	3	6	6^{1}
(Spain) J Arrese	6	4	7^{7}

=== Bottom half ===
First round
6	(Spain) À Corretja	6	6
(Haiti) R Agénor	2	2
(Italy) S Pescosolido	6	4	6
Q	(Spain) R Carretero	4	6	1
(Uruguay) M Filippini	7	6
(Bulgaria) M Velev	5	0
(Russia) Y Kafelnikov	2	1
3	(Spain) A Berasategui	6	6
7	(Argentina) H de la Peña	6^{6}	7	6
(Italy) D Nargiso	7^{8}	5	1
(Spain) F Sánchez	6	3	2
(Spain) F Clavet	0	6	6
(Austria) G Schaller	6^{3}	6	6
Q	(Netherlands) M Koevermans	7^{7}	4	4
WC	(Greece) G Kalovelonis	1	3
2	(Russia) A Cherkasov	6	6

Second round
6	(Spain) À Corretja	4	3
(Italy) S Pescosolido	6	6
(Uruguay) M Filippini	6	4	5
3	(Spain) A Berasategui	2	6	7
7	(Argentina) H de la Peña	5	6	6
(Spain) F Clavet	7	1	0
(Austria) G Schaller	7^{7}	6
2	(Russia) A Cherkasov	6^{2}	2

Quarterfinals
(Italy) S Pescosolido	2	2
3	(Spain) A Berasategui	6	6
7	(Argentina) H de la Peña	6	6
(Austria) G Schaller	3	2

Semifinals
3	(Spain) A Berasategui	6	7
7	(Argentina) H de la Peña	3	5
