= 1993 Athens International – Doubles =

Doubles
- 1993 Athens International

Final
- Champions: (Argentina) Horacio de la Peña (Mexico) Jorge Lozano
- Runners-up: (South Africa) Royce Deppe (United States) John Sullivan
- Score: 3–6, 6–1, 6–2

Events
Singles	Doubles
← 1992 ·	ATP Athens Open	· 1994 →

Tomás Carbonell and Francisco Roig were the defending champions, but did not participate this year.

Horacio de la Peña and Francisco Roig won in the final 3–6, 6–1, 6–2, against Royce Deppe and John Sullivan.

== Seeds ==
1. (Italy) Diego Nargiso / (Spain) Javier Sánchez (quarterfinals)
2. (Netherlands) Mark Koevermans / (United States) Kent Kinnear (semifinals)
3. (Argentina) Horacio de la Peña / (Mexico) Jorge Lozano (champions)
4. (United States) Mike Bauer / (Czech Republic) David Rikl (quarterfinals)

== Draw ==
=== Key ===
- Q = Qualifier
- WC = Wild card
- LL = Lucky loser
- Alt = Alternate
- ITF = ITF entry
- PR = Protected ranking
- SR = Special ranking
- SE = Special exempt
- JE = Junior exempt
- JR = Junior Accelerator Programme entrant
- CO = College Accelerator Programme entrant
- NG = Next Gen Accelerator Program entrant
- w/o = Walkover
- r = Retired
- d = Defaulted

=== Draw ===
First round
1	(Italy) D Nargiso (Spain) J Sánchez	6	6
(South Africa) J de Beer (Sweden) J Donar	4	4
(Czech Republic) V Flégl (Sweden) T Nydahl	4	3
(South Africa) R Deppe (United States) J Sullivan	6	6
4	(United States) M Bauer (Czech Republic) D Rikl	7	7
(United States) D Eisenman (United States) D Johnson	6	5
WC	(Spain) J Arrese (Italy) R Furlan	3	6	6
(United States) B Garnett (United States) TJ Middleton	6	3	7
(United States) F Montana (United States) B Shelton	6	6
Q	(Russia) A Cherkasov (Russia) Y Kafelnikov	3	4
(Italy) C Brandi (Italy) F Mordegan	1	5
3	(Argentina) H de la Peña (Mexico) J Lozano	6	7
WC	(Greece) A Bavelas (Greece) K Efraimoglou	1	6
(United States) R Benson (Argentina) J Garat	6	7
(South Africa) M Barnard (United States) T Mercer	2	6	5
2	(Netherlands) M Koevermans (United States) K Kinnear	6	3	7

Quarterfinals
1	(Italy) D Nargiso (Spain) J Sánchez	5	3
(South Africa) R Deppe (United States) J Sullivan	7	6
4	(United States) M Bauer (Czech Republic) D Rikl	6	7	3
(United States) B Garnett (United States) TJ Middleton	7	6	6
(United States) F Montana (United States) B Shelton	3	7	4
3	(Argentina) H de la Peña (Mexico) J Lozano	6	6	6
(United States) R Benson (Argentina) J Garat	2	2
2	(Netherlands) M Koevermans (United States) K Kinnear	6	6

Semifinals
(South Africa) R Deppe (United States) J Sullivan	6	7
(United States) B Garnett (United States) TJ Middleton	4	5
3	(Argentina) H de la Peña (Mexico) J Lozano	3	6	6
2	(Netherlands) M Koevermans (United States) K Kinnear	6	4	3

Final
(South Africa) R Deppe (United States) J Sullivan	6	1	2
3	(Argentina) H de la Peña (Mexico) J Lozano	3	6	6
