= 1991 Athens Open – Doubles =

Doubles
- 1991 Athens Open

Final
- Champions: (Netherlands) Jacco Eltingh (Netherlands) Mark Koevermans
- Runners-up: (Netherlands) Menno Oosting (Finland) Olli Rahnasto
- Score: 5–7, 7–6, 7–5

Details
- Draw: 16
- Seeds: 4

Events
| Singles | Doubles |
| ← 1990 · | ATP Athens Open | · 1992 → |

Sergio Casal and Javier Sánchez were the defending champions, but Casal did not participate this year. Sánchez partnered Goran Prpić, losing in the first round.

Jacco Eltingh and Mark Koevermans won in the final 5–7, 7–6, 7–5, against Menno Oosting and Olli Rahnasto.

== Seeds ==
1. (Socialist Federal Republic of Yugoslavia) Goran Prpić / (Spain) Javier Sánchez (first round)
2. (Netherlands) Jacco Eltingh / (Netherlands) Mark Koevermans (champions)
3. (Netherlands) Menno Oosting / (Finland) Olli Rahnasto (final)
4. (Sweden) Per Henricsson / (Sweden) Ola Jonsson (semifinals)

== Draw ==
=== Key ===
- Q = Qualifier
- WC = Wild card
- LL = Lucky loser
- Alt = Alternate
- SE = Special exempt
- PR = Protected ranking
- ITF = ITF entry
- JE = Junior exempt
- w/o = Walkover
- r = Retired
- d = Defaulted
- SR = Special ranking

=== Draw ===
First round
1 | (Socialist Federal Republic of Yugoslavia) G Prpić (Spain) J Sánchez | 6 | 2 | 3
(Spain) JC Báguena (Argentina) M Jaite | 1 | 6 | 6
(Netherlands) T Kempers (Denmark) M Mortensen | 6 | 7 | 6
(Germany) J Wöhrmann (Germany) M Zoecke | 7 | 6 | 1
3 | (Netherlands) M Oosting (Finland) O Rahnasto | 6 | 7
(Poland) W Kowalski (Netherlands) J Van Duyn | 2 | 5
WC | (Greece) Andreas Fikas (Greece) G Kalovelonis | 4 | 2
(Argentina) G Markus (Argentina) F Yunis | 6 | 6
(Italy) R Furlan (Spain) J Gisbert-Schultze | 3 | 6 | 2
(Mexico) G Martínez (United States) TJ Middleton | 6 | 2 | 6
(Spain) J Arrese (Belgium) E Masso | 1 | 4
4 | (Sweden) P Henricsson (Sweden) O Jonsson | 6 | 6
(Italy) A Gaudenzi (Austria) T Muster | 6 | 6
Q | (Spain) Talito Corrales (Socialist Federal Republic of Yugoslavia) A Kitinov | 1 | 2
(Spain) F Clavet (Uruguay) M Filippini | 5 | 6
2 | (Netherlands) J Eltingh (Netherlands) M Koevermans | 7 | 7

Quarterfinals
(Spain) JC Báguena (Argentina) M Jaite | 5 | 1
(Netherlands) T Kempers (Denmark) M Mortensen | 7 | 6
3 | (Netherlands) M Oosting (Finland) O Rahnasto | 3 | 6 | 6
(Argentina) G Markus (Argentina) F Yunis | 6 | 0 | 3
(Mexico) G Martínez (United States) TJ Middleton | 2 | 1
4 | (Sweden) P Henricsson (Sweden) O Jonsson | 6 | 6
(Italy) A Gaudenzi (Austria) T Muster | 1 | 3
2 | (Netherlands) J Eltingh (Netherlands) M Koevermans | 6 | 6

Semifinals
(Netherlands) T Kempers (Denmark) M Mortensen | 6 | 2 | 5
3 | (Netherlands) M Oosting (Finland) O Rahnasto | 3 | 6 | 7
4 | (Sweden) P Henricsson (Sweden) O Jonsson | 6 | 6 | 4
2 | (Netherlands) J Eltingh (Netherlands) M Koevermans | 2 | 7 | 6

Final
3 | (Netherlands) M Oosting (Finland) O Rahnasto | 7 | 6 | 5
2 | (Netherlands) J Eltingh (Netherlands) M Koevermans | 5 | 7 | 7
