= 1992 Saab International – Doubles =

Doubles
- 1992 Saab International

Final
- Champions: (Spain) Tomás Carbonell (Spain) Francisco Roig
- Runners-up: (Uruguay) Marcelo Filippini (Netherlands) Mark Koevermans
- Score: 6–3, 6–4

Events
Singles	Doubles
← 1991 ·	ATP Athens Open	· 1993 →

Jacco Eltingh and Mark Koevermans were the defending champions, but Eltingh did not participate this year. Koevermans partnered Marcelo Filippini, finishing runner-up.

Tomás Carbonell and Francisco Roig won in the final 6–3, 6–4, against Marcelo Filippini and Mark Koevermans.

== Seeds ==
1. (Argentina) Horacio de la Peña / (Czechoslovakia) Vojtěch Flégl (first round)
2. (Germany) Marc-Kevin Goellner / (Germany) Lars Koslowski (first round)
3. (Uruguay) Marcelo Filippini / (Netherlands) Mark Koevermans (final)
4. (United States) Murphy Jensen / (Finland) Olli Rahnasto (first round)

== Draw ==
=== Key ===
- Q = Qualifier
- WC = Wild card
- LL = Lucky loser
- Alt = Alternate
- ITF = ITF entry
- PR = Protected ranking
- SR = Special ranking
- SE = Special exempt
- JE = Junior exempt
- JR = Junior Accelerator Programme entrant
- CO = College Accelerator Programme entrant
- NG = Next Gen Accelerator Program entrant
- w/o = Walkover
- r = Retired
- d = Defaulted

=== Draw ===
First round
1	(Argentina) H de la Peña (Czechoslovakia) V Flégl	7	2	3
Q	(Sweden) M Gustafsson (Sweden) L Jonsson	6	6	6
(Spain) F Clavet (Spain) V Solves	6	6	6
(United States) B Devening (Spain) M-A Gorriz	7	1	4
4	(United States) M Jensen (Finland) O Rahnasto	4	6	0
(Spain) J Burillo (Spain) J Sánchez	6	3	6
(Spain) T Carbonell (Spain) F Roig	7	6
WC	(Greece) A Bavelas (Greece) K Efraimoglou	5	1
(Italy) C Brandi (Italy) F Mordegan	2	1
(Germany) M Naewie (Sweden) T Svantesson	6	6
(Sweden) J Donar (Sweden) O Jonsson	2	3
3	(Uruguay) M Filippini (Netherlands) M Koevermans	6	6
WC	(Spain) J Arrese (Argentina) M Jaite	6	4	6
(Germany) D Prinosil (Czechoslovakia) M Střelba	0	6	2
(United States) M Bauer (Denmark) M Mortensen	7	6
2	(Germany) M-K Goellner (Germany) L Koslowski	5	3

Quarterfinals
Q	(Sweden) M Gustafsson (Sweden) L Jonsson	6	4	2
(Spain) F Clavet (Spain) V Solves	4	6	6
(Spain) J Burillo (Spain) J Sánchez	6	3	4
(Spain) T Carbonell (Spain) F Roig	4	6	6
(Germany) M Naewie (Sweden) T Svantesson	2	6	3
3	(Uruguay) M Filippini (Netherlands) M Koevermans	6	4	6
WC	(Spain) J Arrese (Argentina) M Jaite	1	6
(United States) M Bauer (Denmark) M Mortensen	6	7

Semifinals
(Spain) F Clavet (Spain) V Solves	1	2
(Spain) T Carbonell (Spain) F Roig	6	6
3	(Uruguay) M Filippini (Netherlands) M Koevermans	7	2	6
(United States) M Bauer (Denmark) M Mortensen	6	6	1

Final
(Spain) T Carbonell (Spain) F Roig	6	6
3	(Uruguay) M Filippini (Netherlands) M Koevermans	3	4
