= 1990 Athens Open – Doubles =

Doubles
- 1990 Athens Open

Final
- Champions: (Spain) Sergio Casal (Spain) Javier Sánchez
- Runners-up: (Netherlands) Tom Kempers (Netherlands) Richard Krajicek
- Score: 6–4, 6–3

Details
- Draw: 16
- Seeds: 4

Events
Singles	Doubles
← 1989 ·	ATP Athens Open	· 1991 →

Claudio Panatta and Tomáš Šmíd were the defending champions, but did not participate this year.

Sergio Casal and Javier Sánchez won in the final 6–4, 6–3, against Tom Kempers and Richard Krajicek.

== Seeds ==
1. (Spain) Sergio Casal / (Spain) Javier Sánchez (champions)
2. (Netherlands) Mark Koevermans / (Uruguay) Diego Pérez (semifinals)
3. (Spain) Tomás Carbonell / (Argentina) Guillermo Pérez Roldán (quarterfinals)
4. (Sweden) Ronnie Båthman / (Sweden) Rikard Bergh (semifinals)

== Draw ==
=== Key ===
- Q = Qualifier
- WC = Wild card
- LL = Lucky loser
- Alt = Alternate
- ITF = ITF entry
- PR = Protected ranking
- SR = Special ranking
- SE = Special exempt
- JE = Junior exempt
- JR = Junior Accelerator Programme entrant
- CO = College Accelerator Programme entrant
- NG = Next Gen Accelerator Program entrant
- w/o = Walkover
- r = Retired
- d = Defaulted

=== Draw ===
First round
1	(Spain) S Casal (Spain) J Sánchez	6	4	6
(Spain) C Costa (Argentina) H de la Peña	4	6	2
(Spain) JC Báguena (Spain) G López	3	6	6
(United States) J Tarango (Czechoslovakia) M Vajda	6	2	3
4	(Sweden) R Båthman (Sweden) R Bergh	7	6
(Switzerland) C Mezzadri (Switzerland) S Mezzadri	6	4
(United Kingdom) N Brown (Sweden) T Nydahl	5	5
(Spain) J Arrese (Spain) F Roig	7	7
Q	(Netherlands) T Kempers (Netherlands) R Krajicek	6	7
(United States) Scott Morse (United States) S Patridge	3	5
(Czechoslovakia) S Doseděl (Italy) R Furlan	3	1
3	(Spain) T Carbonell (Argentina) G Pérez Roldán	6	6
(Spain) F Clavet (Spain) D de Miguel	6	6
WC	(Greece) A Bavelas (Greece) Ioannis Rigas	2	4
(Spain) JF Altur (Spain) JL Aparisi	6	3	5
2	(Netherlands) M Koevermans (Uruguay) D Pérez	4	6	7

Quarterfinals
1	(Spain) S Casal (Spain) J Sánchez	6	6
(Spain) JC Báguena (Spain) G López	2	3
4	(Sweden) R Båthman (Sweden) R Bergh	6	6
(Spain) J Arrese (Spain) F Roig	3	0
Q	(Netherlands) T Kempers (Netherlands) R Krajicek	7	7
3	(Spain) T Carbonell (Argentina) G Pérez Roldán	6	6
(Spain) F Clavet (Spain) D de Miguel	1	6
2	(Netherlands) M Koevermans (Uruguay) D Pérez	6	7

Semifinals
1	(Spain) S Casal (Spain) J Sánchez	6	6
4	(Sweden) R Båthman (Sweden) R Bergh	3	3
Q	(Netherlands) T Kempers (Netherlands) R Krajicek	3	6	6
2	(Netherlands) M Koevermans (Uruguay) D Pérez	6	4	3

Final
1	(Spain) S Casal (Spain) J Sánchez	6	6
Q	(Netherlands) T Kempers (Netherlands) R Krajicek	4	3
