= 1994 Athens International – Doubles =

Doubles
- 1994 Athens International

Final
- Champions: (Argentina) Luis Lobo (Spain) Javier Sánchez
- Runners-up: (Italy) Cristian Brandi (Italy) Federico Mordegan
- Score: 5–7, 6–1, 6–4

Events
Singles	Doubles
← 1993 ·	ATP Athens Open

Horacio de la Peña and Jorge Lozano were the defending champions, but did not participate this year.

Luis Lobo and Javier Sánchez won in the final 5–7, 6–1, 6–4, against Cristian Brandi and Federico Mordegan.

== Seeds ==
1. (Belgium) Libor Pimek / (Spain) Francisco Roig (quarterfinals)
2. (Argentina) Luis Lobo / (Spain) Javier Sánchez (champions)
3. (United States) Shelby Cannon / (South Africa) Marcos Ondruska (quarterfinals)
4. (Italy) Cristian Brandi / (Italy) Federico Mordegan (final)

== Draw ==
=== Key ===
- Q = Qualifier
- WC = Wild card
- LL = Lucky loser
- Alt = Alternate
- SE = Special exempt
- PR = Protected ranking
- ITF = ITF entry
- JE = Junior exempt
- w/o = Walkover
- r = Retired
- d = Defaulted
- SR = Special ranking

=== Draw ===
First round
1	(Belgium) L Pimek (Spain) F Roig	3	7	7
(Germany) M Sinner (New Zealand) G Wilson	6	6	6
(United States) D Johnson (United States) M Keil	4	6
(Netherlands) T Kempers (United States) J Waite	6	7
4	(Italy) C Brandi (Italy) F Mordegan	6	6
WC	(Australia) P Cash (Latvia) Ģ Dzelde	2	4
(Spain) JA Conde (Argentina) D Orsanic	6	6
WC	(Greece) P Moschoutis (Greece) S Peppas	1	3
(Belgium) F Dewulf (France) G Solvès	6	2
(Spain) J Arrese (Australia) W Arthurs	7	6
WC	(Bulgaria) O Stanoytchev (Greece) Yannis Tsagas	2	0
3	(United States) S Cannon (South Africa) M Ondruska	6	6
(United Kingdom) N Broad (United States) G Van Emburgh	6	3
(Czech Republic) V Flégl (Slovakia) K Kučera	0	0^{r}
(South Africa) K Haygarth (Australia) J Ireland	2	4
2	(Argentina) L Lobo (Spain) J Sánchez	6	6

Quarterfinals
1	(Belgium) L Pimek (Spain) F Roig	2	5
(Netherlands) T Kempers (United States) J Waite	6	7
4	(Italy) C Brandi (Italy) F Mordegan	6	6
(Spain) JA Conde (Argentina) D Orsanic	4	4
(Spain) J Arrese (Australia) W Arthurs	3	6	7
3	(United States) S Cannon (South Africa) M Ondruska	6	3	6
(United Kingdom) N Broad (United States) G Van Emburgh	4	3
2	(Argentina) L Lobo (Spain) J Sánchez	6	6

Semifinals
(Netherlands) T Kempers (United States) J Waite	4	6	6
4	(Italy) C Brandi (Italy) F Mordegan	6	2	7
(Spain) J Arrese (Australia) W Arthurs	6	6
2	(Argentina) L Lobo (Spain) J Sánchez	7	7

Final
4	(Italy) C Brandi (Italy) F Mordegan	7	1	4
2	(Argentina) L Lobo (Spain) J Sánchez	5	6	6
