= 1991 Athens Open =

- Date: 30 September – 7 October
- Edition: 6th
- Category: World Series
- Draw: 32S / 16D
- Prize money: $125,000
- Surface: Clay / outdoor
- Location: Athens, Greece

Champions

Singles
- (Spain) Sergi Bruguera

Doubles
- (Netherlands) Jacco Eltingh / (Netherlands) Mark Koevermans
← 1990 ·	ATP Athens Open	· 1992 →

The 1991 Athens Open was a men's tennis tournament played on outdoor clay courts in Athens, Greece that was part of the World Series of the 1991 ATP Tour. It was the sixth edition of the tournament and was held from 30 September until 7 October 1991. First-seeded Sergi Bruguera won the singles title.

== Finals ==
=== Singles ===
(Spain) Sergi Bruguera defeated (Spain) Jordi Arrese 7–5, 6–3

- It was Bruguera's 3rd singles title of the year of his career.

=== Doubles ===
(Netherlands) Jacco Eltingh / (Netherlands) Mark Koevermans defeated (Netherlands) Menno Oosting / (Finland) Olli Rahnasto 5–7, 7–6, 7–5

- It was Eltingh's 2nd title of the year and the 2nd of his career. It was Koevermans' 1st title of the year and the 2nd of his career.
