= 1991 Athens Open – Singles =

Singles
- 1991 Athens Open

Final
- Champion: (Spain) Sergi Bruguera
- Runner-up: (Spain) Jordi Arrese
- Score: 7–5, 6–3

Details
- Draw: 32
- Seeds: 8

Events
Singles	Doubles
← 1990 ·	ATP Athens Open	· 1992 →

Mark Koevermans was the defending champion, but lost in the quarterfinals this year.

Sergi Bruguera won the tournament, beating Jordi Arrese in the final, 7–5, 6–3.

== Seeds ==
1. (Spain) Sergi Bruguera (champion)
2. (Socialist Federal Republic of Yugoslavia) Goran Prpić (first round)
3. (Spain) Javier Sánchez (second round)
4. (Austria) Thomas Muster (semifinals)
5. (Spain) Francisco Clavet (semifinals)
6. (Argentina) Guillermo Pérez Roldán (quarterfinals)
7. (Argentina) Martín Jaite (first round)
8. (Spain) Jordi Arrese (final)

== Draw ==
=== Key ===
- Q = Qualifier
- WC = Wild card
- LL = Lucky loser
- Alt = Alternate
- SE = Special exempt
- PR = Protected ranking
- ITF = ITF entry
- JE = Junior exempt
- w/o = Walkover
- r = Retired
- d = Defaulted
- SR = Special ranking

=== Finals ===
Semifinals
1	(Spain) Sergi Bruguera	1	6	6
4	(Austria) Thomas Muster	6	2	0
5	(Spain) Francisco Clavet	5	2
8	(Spain) Jordi Arrese	7	6

Final
1	(Spain) Sergi Bruguera	7	6
8	(Spain) Jordi Arrese	5	3

=== Top half ===
First round
1	(Spain) S Bruguera	6	7
(Germany) P Kühnen	2	5
Q	(Bulgaria) M Velev	4	3
Q	(Poland) W Kowalski	6	6
(Czechoslovakia) M Vajda	3	2
(Germany) J Wöhrmann	6	6
(Italy) R Furlan	6	3	6
7	(Argentina) M Jaite	1	6	3
4	(Austria) T Muster	6	6
(Netherlands) J Eltingh	4	3
(Argentina) F Yunis	6	3	7^{7}
(Spain) JC Báguena	2	6	6^{5}
WC	(Greece) G Kalovelonis	4	6	3
(Belgium) B Wuyts	6	3	6
WC	(Greece) A Bavelas	3	1
6	(Argentina) G Pérez Roldán	6	6

Second round
1	(Spain) S Bruguera	6	6
Q	(Poland) W Kowalski	2	1
(Germany) J Wöhrmann	5	0
(Italy) R Furlan	7	6
4	(Austria) T Muster	6	6
(Argentina) F Yunis	4	3
(Belgium) B Wuyts	1	2
6	(Argentina) G Pérez Roldán	6	6

Quarterfinals
1	(Spain) S Bruguera	6	6
(Italy) R Furlan	2	2
4	(Austria) T Muster	6	3	7^{7}
6	(Argentina) G Pérez Roldán	3	6	6^{3}

Semifinals
1	(Spain) S Bruguera	1	6	6
4	(Austria) T Muster	6	2	0

=== Bottom half ===
First round
5	(Spain) F Clavet	7^{7}	6
(Belgium) E Masso	6^{5}	3
(Argentina) R Azar	6	6
Q	(Italy) A Gaudenzi	3	0
(Sweden) L Jonsson	6	0	6
(Uruguay) M Filippini	2	6	3
(Germany) B Karbacher	4	6^{3}
3	(Spain) J Sánchez	6	7^{7}
8	(Spain) J Arrese	7^{8}	6
Q	(Germany) T Theine	6^{6}	1
(Italy) C Pistolesi	2	6	1
(Argentina) G Markus	6	3	6
(United States) TJ Middleton	1	2
(Netherlands) M Koevermans	6	6
(Germany) M Zoecke	7^{7}	3	6
2	(Socialist Federal Republic of Yugoslavia) G Prpić	6^{4}	6	4

Second round
5	(Spain) F Clavet	4	6	6
(Argentina) R Azar	6	4	0
(Sweden) L Jonsson	6	3	6
3	(Spain) J Sánchez	4	6	4
8	(Spain) J Arrese	6	6
(Argentina) G Markus	2	4
(Netherlands) M Koevermans	6	6
(Germany) M Zoecke	0	2

Quarterfinals
5	(Spain) F Clavet	7^{7}	6
(Sweden) L Jonsson	6^{5}	1
8	(Spain) J Arrese	2	6	6
(Netherlands) M Koevermans	6	3	4

Semifinals
5	(Spain) F Clavet	5	2
8	(Spain) J Arrese	7	6
