= 1992 Saab International – Singles =

Singles
- 1992 Saab International

Final
- Champion: (Spain) Jordi Arrese
- Runner-up: (Spain) Sergi Bruguera
- Score: 7–5, 3–0 (Bruguera retired)

Details
- Draw: 32
- Seeds: 8

Events
Singles	Doubles
← 1991 ·	ATP Athens Open	· 1993 →

Sergi Bruguera was the defending champion but was forced to retire in the final losing 7–5, 3–0 against Jordi Arrese.

== Seeds ==
1. (Spain) Sergi Bruguera (final)
2. (Spain) Francisco Clavet (semifinals)
3. (Spain) Jordi Arrese (champion)
4. (Spain) Javier Sánchez (semifinals)
5. (Argentina) Guillermo Pérez Roldán (first round)
6. (Argentina) Gabriel Markus (first round)
7. (Sweden) Magnus Gustafsson (quarterfinals)
8. (Uruguay) Marcelo Filippini (first round)

== Draw ==
=== Key ===
- Q = Qualifier
- WC = Wild card
- LL = Lucky loser
- Alt = Alternate
- ITF = ITF entry
- PR = Protected ranking
- SR = Special ranking
- SE = Special exempt
- JE = Junior exempt
- JR = Junior Accelerator Programme entrant
- CO = College Accelerator Programme entrant
- NG = Next Gen Accelerator Program entrant
- w/o = Walkover
- r = Retired
- d = Defaulted

=== Finals ===
Semifinals
1	(Spain) Sergi Bruguera	7	6^{1}	6
4	(Spain) Javier Sánchez	5	7^{7}	4
3	(Spain) Jordi Arrese	7	6
2	(Spain) Francisco Clavet	5	2

Final
1	(Spain) Sergi Bruguera	5	0^{r}
3	(Spain) Jordi Arrese	7	3

=== Top half ===
First round
1	(Spain) S Bruguera	6	6
WC	(Greece) A Bavelas	2	1
(Argentina) H de la Peña	6	6
Q	(Romania) D Pescariu	2	3
(Germany) M Naewie	6	6
(Czechoslovakia) M Střelba	4	4
(Sweden) L Jonsson	6	6^{3}	1
7	(Sweden) M Gustafsson	2	7^{7}	6
4	(Spain) J Sánchez	6	7
Q	(Austria) T Buchmayer	4	5
(Spain) J Burillo	5	3
(France) F Fontang	7	6
WC	(Greece) A Fikas	3	0
(Spain) M A Gorriz	6	6
Q	(Bulgaria) M Velev	6	6
5	(Argentina) G Pérez Roldán	4	3

Second round
1	(Spain) S Bruguera	6	6
(Argentina) H de la Peña	3	1
(Germany) M Naewie	4	3
7	(Sweden) M Gustafsson	6	6
4	(Spain) J Sánchez	6	3	6
(France) F Fontang	1	6	2
(Spain) M A Gorriz	4	2
Q	(Bulgaria) M Velev	6	6

Quarterfinals
1	(Spain) S Bruguera	6
7	(Sweden) M Gustafsson	2	r
4	(Spain) J Sánchez	2	6	6
Q	(Bulgaria) M Velev	6	3	2

Semifinals
1	(Spain) S Bruguera	7	6^{1}	6
4	(Spain) J Sánchez	5	7^{7}	4

=== Bottom half ===
First round
6	(Argentina) G Markus	4	2
WC	(France) T Champion	6	6
(Germany) D Prinosil	4	3
(Argentina) M Jaite	6	6
(Netherlands) M Koevermans	5	3
(Austria) H Skoff	7	6
(Spain) J F Altur	6^{4}	2
3	(Spain) J Arrese	7^{7}	6
8	(Uruguay) M Filippini	3	6	4
(Germany) M-K Goellner	6	4	6
(Italy) R Furlan	6	6
(Germany) L Koslowski	2	1
(Spain) F Roig	4	5
(Spain) T Carbonell	6	7
Q	(Spain) T Corrales	1	2
2	(Spain) F Clavet	6	6

Second round
WC	(France) T Champion	3	1^{r}
(Argentina) M Jaite	6	1
(Austria) H Skoff	2	4
3	(Spain) J Arrese	6	6
(Germany) M-K Goellner	6	7^{7}
(Italy) R Furlan	3	6^{4}
(Spain) T Carbonell	4	6^{5}
2	(Spain) F Clavet	6	7^{7}

Quarterfinals
(Argentina) M Jaite	3	2
3	(Spain) J Arrese	6	6
(Germany) M-K Goellner	2	2
2	(Spain) F Clavet	6	6

Semifinals
3	(Spain) J Arrese	7	6
2	(Spain) F Clavet	5	2
