= 1992 Saab International =

- Date: 5–12 October
- Edition: 7th
- Category: World Series
- Draw: 32S / 16D
- Prize money: $130,000
- Surface: Clay / outdoor
- Location: Athens, Greece

Champions

Singles
- (Spain) Jordi Arrese

Doubles
- (Spain) Tomás Carbonell / (Spain) Francisco Roig
← 1991 ·	ATP Athens Open	· 1993 →

The 1992 Saab International, also known as the 'Athens Open', was a men's tennis tournament played on outdoor clay courts in Athens, Greece that was part of the World Series of the 1992 ATP Tour. It was the seventh edition of the tournament and was played from 5 October until 12 October 1992. Third-seeded Jordi Arrese won the singles title.

== Finals ==
=== Singles ===
(Spain) Jordi Arrese defeated (Spain) Sergi Bruguera 7–5, 3–0 (Bruguera retired)

- It was Arrese's only singles title of the year and the 5th of his career.

=== Doubles ===
(Spain) Tomás Carbonell / (Spain) Francisco Roig defeated (Uruguay) Marcelo Filippini / (Netherlands) Mark Koevermans 6–3, 6–4

- It was Carbonell's 3rd title of the year and the 9th of his career. It was Roig's 1st title of the year and the 2nd of his career.
