= 1990 Athens Open =

- Date: 1–7 October
- Edition: 5th
- Category: World Series
- Draw: 32S / 16D
- Prize money: $125,000
- Surface: Clay / outdoor
- Location: Athens, Greece

Champions

Singles
- (Netherlands) Mark Koevermans

Doubles
- (Spain) Sergio Casal / (Spain) Javier Sánchez
← 1989 ·	ATP Athens Open	· 1991 →

The 1990 ATP Athens Open was a men's tennis tournament played on outdoor clay courts in Athens in Greece that was part of the World Series of the 1990 ATP Tour. It was held from 1 October through 7 October 1990. Seventh-seeded Mark Koevermans won the singles title.

== Finals ==
=== Singles ===
(Netherlands) Mark Koevermans defeated (Argentina) Franco Davín 5–7, 6–4, 6–1

- It was Koevermans' only singles title of his career.

=== Doubles ===
(Spain) Sergio Casal / (Spain) Javier Sánchez defeated (Netherlands) Tom Kempers / (Netherlands) Richard Krajicek 6–4, 6–3

- It was Casal's 7th title of the year and the 32nd of his career. It was Sánchez's 4th title of the year and the 10th of his career.

== See also ==
- 1990 Athens Trophy – women's tournament
