= 1990 Athens Open – Singles =

Singles
- 1990 Athens Open

Final
- Champion: (Netherlands) Mark Koevermans
- Runner-up: (Argentina) Franco Davín
- Score: 5–7, 6–4, 6–1

Details
- Draw: 32
- Seeds: 8

Events
| Singles | Doubles |
| ← 1989 · | ATP Athens Open | · 1991 → |

Ronald Agénor was the defending champion, but did not participate this year.

Mark Koevermans won the tournament, beating Franco Davín in the final, 5–7, 6–4, 6–1.

== Seeds ==
1. (Austria) Thomas Muster (second round)
2. (Spain) Emilio Sánchez (first round)
3. (Argentina) Guillermo Pérez Roldán (quarterfinals)
4. (Spain) Jordi Arrese (semifinals)
5. (Argentina) Franco Davín (final)
6. (Spain) Javier Sánchez (quarterfinals)
7. (Netherlands) Mark Koevermans (champion)
8. (Argentina) Horacio de la Peña (second round)

== Draw ==
=== Key ===
- Q = Qualifier
- WC = Wild card
- LL = Lucky loser
- Alt = Alternate
- ITF = ITF entry
- PR = Protected ranking
- SR = Special ranking
- SE = Special exempt
- JE = Junior exempt
- JR = Junior Accelerator Programme entrant
- CO = College Accelerator Programme entrant
- NG = Next Gen Accelerator Program entrant
- w/o = Walkover
- r = Retired
- d = Defaulted

=== Finals ===
Semifinals
(Czechoslovakia) Marián Vajda | 6^{1} | 6 | 3
5 | (Argentina) Franco Davín | 7^{7} | 2 | 6
4 | (Spain) Jordi Arrese | 2 | 6^{4}
7 | (Netherlands) Mark Koevermans | 6 | 7^{7}

Final
5 | (Argentina) Franco Davín | 7 | 4 | 1
7 | (Netherlands) Mark Koevermans | 5 | 6 | 6

=== Top half ===
First round
1 | (Austria) T Muster | 7 | 6
(Canada) M Wostenholme | 6 | 3
(West Germany) J Wöhrmann | 2 | 6
(Czechoslovakia) M Vajda | 6 | 7
(Spain) T Carbonell | 7 | 6
Q | (Spain) MA Gorriz | 6 | 3
(Uruguay) D Pérez | 4 | 4
8 | (Argentina) H de la Peña | 6 | 6
3 | (Argentina) G Pérez Roldán | 7 | 6 | 6
(Spain) C Costa | 6 | 7 | 1
(United States) J Tarango | 6 | 4 | 6
WC | (Spain) S Casal | 3 | 6 | 4
(Spain) F Luna | 6 | 6
(Czechoslovakia) M Střelba | 2 | 2
(Italy) R Furlan | 3 | 1
5 | (Argentina) F Davín | 6 | 6

Second round
1 | (Austria) T Muster | 6 | 6 | 3
(Czechoslovakia) M Vajda | 3 | 7 | 6
(Spain) T Carbonell | 6 | 6
8 | (Argentina) H de la Peña | 1 | 4
3 | (Argentina) G Pérez Roldán | 6 | 6
(United States) J Tarango | 2 | 3
(Spain) F Luna | 5 | 3
5 | (Argentina) F Davín | 7 | 6

Quarterfinals
(Czechoslovakia) M Vajda | 6 | 6
(Spain) T Carbonell | 3 | 3
3 | (Argentina) G Pérez Roldán | 2 | 1
5 | (Argentina) F Davín | 6 | 6

Semifinals
(Czechoslovakia) M Vajda | 6^{1} | 6 | 3
5 | (Argentina) F Davín | 7^{7} | 2 | 6

=== Bottom half ===
First round
6 | (Spain) J Sánchez | 6 | 6 | 6
Q | (Czechoslovakia) S Doseděl | 7 | 2 | 3
(Spain) JF Altur | 3 | 6
(United States) L Duncan | 6 | 7
WC | (Greece) G Kalovelonis | 2 | 2
(United States) J Brown | 6 | 6
Q | (Spain) G López | 2 | 1
4 | (Spain) J Arrese | 6 | 6
7 | (Netherlands) M Koevermans | 6 | 6
(Portugal) J Cunha-Silva | 4 | 2
(Argentina) R Azar | 4 | 6 | 2
WC | (Greece) A Bavelas | 6 | 3 | 6
(Spain) F Clavet | 2 | 6 | 6
LL | (Sweden) T Nydahl | 6 | 3 | 2
(Spain) F Roig | 6 | 7
2 | (Spain) E Sánchez | 2 | 6

Second round
6 | (Spain) J Sánchez | 6 | 6
(United States) L Duncan | 4 | 0
(United States) J Brown | 3 | 6
4 | (Spain) J Arrese | 6 | 7
7 | (Netherlands) M Koevermans | 6 | 4 | 6
WC | (Greece) A Bavelas | 3 | 6 | 2
(Spain) F Clavet | 2 | 7 | 4
(Spain) F Roig | 6 | 6 | 6

Quarterfinals
6 | (Spain) J Sánchez | 2 | 3
4 | (Spain) J Arrese | 6 | 6
7 | (Netherlands) M Koevermans | 3 | 6 | 6
(Spain) F Roig | 6 | 1 | 2

Semifinals
4 | (Spain) J Arrese | 2 | 6^{4}
7 | (Netherlands) M Koevermans | 6 | 7^{7}
