= 1994 Athens International – Singles =

Singles
- 1994 Athens International

Final
- Champion: (Spain) Alberto Berasategui
- Runner-up: (Spain) Oscar Martinez
- Score: 4–6, 7–6^{(7–4)}, 6–3

Details
- Draw: 32
- Seeds: 8

Events
Singles	Doubles
- ATP Athens Open

Jordi Arrese was the defending champion, but lost in the quarterfinals this year.

Alberto Berasategui won the tournament, beating Oscar Martinez in the final, 4–6, 7–6^{(7–4)}, 6–3.

== Seeds ==
1. (Spain) Alberto Berasategui (champion)
2. (Spain) Carlos Costa (first round)
3. (Spain) Àlex Corretja (semifinals)
4. (Spain) Javier Sánchez (quarterfinals)
5. (Italy) Renzo Furlan (first round)
6. (Austria) Gilbert Schaller (second round)
7. (Spain) Jordi Arrese (quarterfinals)
8. (Slovakia) Karol Kučera (second round)

== Draw ==
Key

- Q = Qualifier
- WC = Wild card
- LL = Lucky loser
- Alt = Alternate
- ITF = ITF entry
- PR = Protected ranking
- SR = Special ranking
- SE = Special exempt
- JE = Junior exempt
- JR = Junior Accelerator Programme entrant
- CO = College Accelerator Programme entrant
- NG = Next Gen Accelerator Program entrant
- w/o = Walkover
- r = Retired
- d = Defaulted

=== Finals ===
Semifinals
1	(Spain) Alberto Berasategui	6	6^{11}	6
(Spain) Francisco Clavet	2	7^{13}	0
3	(Spain) Àlex Corretja	6^{5}	3
(Spain) Oscar Martinez	7^{7}	6

Final
1	(Spain) Alberto Berasategui	4	7^{7}	6
(Spain) Oscar Martinez	6	6^{4}	3

=== Top half ===
First round
1	(Spain) A Berasategui	6	6
(Russia) A Cherkasov	4	4
WC	(Greece) P Moschoutis	6^{4}	2
(Chile) M Ríos	7^{7}	6
WC	(Greece) G Kalovelonis	2	0
(South Africa) M Ondruska	6	6
(Italy) P Canè	7	4	2
8	(Slovakia) K Kučera	5	6	6
4	(Spain) J Sánchez	7^{7}	6
(Spain) F Roig	6^{5}	4
(United States) V Spadea	6	6
(Morocco) Y El Aynaoui	3	4
(Argentina) G Markus	6	6^{3}	6
Q	(Spain) G Blanco	4	7^{7}	4
(Spain) F Clavet	6	6^{5}	6
5	(Italy) R Furlan	2	7^{7}	2

Second round
1	(Spain) A Berasategui	6	6^{4}	6
(Chile) M Ríos	2	7^{7}	3
(South Africa) M Ondruska	2	6	6
8	(Slovakia) K Kučera	6	3	4
4	(Spain) J Sánchez	6	6
(United States) V Spadea	2	1
(Argentina) G Markus	4	7	5
(Spain) F Clavet	6	5	7

Quarterfinals
1	(Spain) A Berasategui	7	4	6
(South Africa) M Ondruska	5	6	4
4	(Spain) J Sánchez	7	6^{13}	4
(Spain) F Clavet	5	7^{15}	6

Semifinals
1	(Spain) A Berasategui	6	6^{11}	6
(Spain) F Clavet	2	7^{13}	0

=== Bottom half ===
First round
6	(Austria) G Schaller	6	6
(France) G Solvès	4	4
Q	(Germany) C Arriens	7	4	6
WC	(Greece) S Peppas	5	6	1
(Spain) J Burillo	6	7^{7}
(Germany) M Sinner	4	6^{3}
Q	(Hungary) S Noszály	6^{5}	3
3	(Spain) À Corretja	7^{7}	6
7	(Spain) J Arrese	6	6
(Belgium) F Dewulf	3	2
Q	(Spain) J Díaz	1	0
(Germany) O Gross	6	6
(Argentina) D Orsanic	6	7^{7}
(Morocco) K Alami	1	6^{3}
(Spain) O Martinez	6	6
2	(Spain) C Costa	4	2

Second round
6	(Austria) G Schaller	1	4
Q	(Germany) C Arriens	6	6
(Spain) J Burillo	7^{7}	1	1
3	(Spain) À Corretja	6^{0}	6	6
7	(Spain) J Arrese	6	6
(Germany) O Gross	3	2
(Argentina) D Orsanic	3	6	3
(Spain) O Martinez	6	3	6

Quarterfinals
Q	(Germany) C Arriens	4	6	6^{5}
3	(Spain) À Corretja	6	2	7^{7}
7	(Spain) J Arrese	5	6^{2}
(Spain) O Martinez	7	7^{7}

Semifinals
3	(Spain) À Corretja	6^{5}	3
(Spain) O Martinez	7^{7}	6
