= 1990 Campionati Internazionali di Sicilia – Doubles =

Doubles
- 1990 Campionati Internazionali di Sicilia

Final
- Champions: (Spain) Sergio Casal (Spain) Emilio Sánchez
- Runners-up: (Spain) Carlos Costa (Argentina) Horacio de la Peña
- Score: 6–3, 6–4

Details
- Draw: 16
- Seeds: 4

Events
Singles	Doubles
← 1989 ·	Campionati Internazionali di Sicilia	· 1991 →

Peter Ballauff and Rüdiger Haas were the defending champions, but did not compete this year.

Sergio Casal and Emilio Sánchez won the title by defeating Carlos Costa and Horacio de la Peña 6–3, 6–4 in the final.

== Seeds ==
1. (Spain) Sergio Casal / (Spain) Emilio Sánchez (champions)
2. (Italy) Omar Camporese / (Spain) Javier Sánchez (semifinals)
3. (Spain) Sergi Bruguera / (Argentina) Guillermo Pérez Roldán (first round, withdrew)
4. (n/a)

== Draw ==
=== Key ===
- Q = Qualifier
- WC = Wild card
- LL = Lucky loser
- Alt = Alternate
- SE = Special exempt
- PR = Protected ranking
- ITF = ITF entry
- JE = Junior exempt
- w/o = Walkover
- r = Retired
- d = Defaulted
- SR = Special ranking

=== Draw ===
First round
1	(Spain) S Casal (Spain) E Sánchez	w	/	o
(Italy) M Boscatto (Italy) S Pescosolido
(Spain) J Clavet (Spain) M Górriz	6	6
(Italy) M Cierro (Italy) A de Minicis	3	4
LL	(Argentina) F Davín (Italy) C Pistolesi	6	6
(Czechoslovakia) S Doseděl (Czechoslovakia) M Vajda	3	4
(Italy) C Brandi (Italy) F Mordegan	6	6
(Italy) P Canè (Austria) H Skoff	2	2
Q	(Italy) N Bruno (Italy) M Visconti	4	6	2
(Spain) C Costa (Argentina) H de la Peña	6	3	6
(France) T Benhabiles (Socialist Federal Republic of Yugoslavia) G Prpić	w	/	o
3	(Spain) S Bruguera (Argentina) G Pérez Roldán
(Sweden) C Allgårdh (Sweden) O Jonsson	6	6
(Italy) A Gaudenzi (Italy) M Meneschincheri	3	3
(Spain) JC Báguena (Spain) F Clavet	1	6
2	(Italy) O Camporese (Spain) J Sánchez	6	7

Quarterfinals
1	(Spain) S Casal (Spain) E Sánchez	6	7
(Spain) J Clavet (Spain) M Górriz	3	6
LL	(Argentina) F Davín (Italy) C Pistolesi	0	6	6
(Italy) C Brandi (Italy) F Mordegan	6	3	7
(Spain) C Costa (Argentina) H de la Peña	3	6	6
(France) T Benhabiles (Socialist Federal Republic of Yugoslavia) G Prpić	6	3	1
(Sweden) C Allgårdh (Sweden) O Jonsson	4	4
2	(Italy) O Camporese (Spain) J Sánchez	6	6

Semifinals
1	(Spain) S Casal (Spain) E Sánchez	7	6
(Italy) C Brandi (Italy) F Mordegan	6	4
(Spain) C Costa (Argentina) H de la Peña	6	7
2	(Italy) O Camporese (Spain) J Sánchez	4	5

Final
1	(Spain) S Casal (Spain) E Sánchez	6	6
(Spain) C Costa (Argentina) H de la Peña	3	4
