= 1991 ATP German Open – Singles =

Singles
- 1991 ATP German Open

Final
- Champion: (Czech Republic) Karel Nováček
- Runner-up: (Sweden) Magnus Gustafsson
- Score: 6–3, 6–3, 5–7, 0–6, 6–1

Details
- Draw: 56
- Seeds: 16

Events
Singles	Doubles
← 1990 ·	ATP German Open	· 1992 →

Karel Nováček defeated Magnus Gustafsson in the final, 6–3, 6–3, 5–7, 0–6, 6–1 to win the singles tennis title at the 1991 Hamburg European Open.

Juan Aguilera was the defending champion, but lost in the first round to Jordi Arrese.

== Seeds ==
1. (Sweden) Stefan Edberg (Quarterfinal)
2. (Czechoslovakia) Ivan Lendl (second round)
3. (United States) Pete Sampras (third round)
4. (Socialist Federal Republic of Yugoslavia) Goran Ivanišević (Quarterfinal, retired)
5. (Spain) Sergi Bruguera (third round)
6. (United States) Jim Courier (second round)
7. (Sweden) Jonas Svensson (second round)
8. (Spain) Emilio Sánchez (second round)
9. (Germany) Michael Stich (semifinal)
10. (Soviet Union) Andrei Cherkasov (second round)
11. (Ecuador) Andrés Gómez (first round)
12. (Soviet Union) Andrei Chesnokov (first round)
13. (Czechoslovakia) Karel Nováček (champion)
14. (Soviet Union) Alexander Volkov (third round)
15. (Argentina) ~~Guillermo Pérez Roldán~~ (withdrew)
16. (Switzerland) Marc Rosset (first round)

== Draw ==
=== Key ===
- Q = Qualifier
- WC = Wild card
- LL = Lucky loser
- Alt = Alternate
- ITF = ITF entry
- PR = Protected ranking
- SR = Special ranking
- SE = Special exempt
- JE = Junior exempt
- JR = Junior Accelerator Programme entrant
- CO = College Accelerator Programme entrant
- NG = Next Gen Accelerator Program entrant
- w/o = Walkover
- r = Retired
- d = Defaulted

=== Finals ===
Quarterfinal
1	(Sweden) Stefan Edberg	2	6^{4}
9	(Germany) Michael Stich	6	7
13	(Czechoslovakia) Karel Nováček	4	6	6
(Netherlands) Mark Koevermans	6	4	2
(Socialist Federal Republic of Yugoslavia) Goran Prpić	7	3
4	(Socialist Federal Republic of Yugoslavia) Goran Ivanišević	5	0^{r}
(Sweden) Magnus Gustafsson	6	6
WC	(France) Yannick Noah	1	4

Semifinal
9	(Germany) Michael Stich	3	6	6^{5}
13	(Czechoslovakia) Karel Nováček	6	2	7
(Socialist Federal Republic of Yugoslavia) Goran Prpić	2	6	6^{4}
(Sweden) Magnus Gustafsson	6	1	7

Final
13	(Czechoslovakia) Karel Nováček	6	6	5	0	6
(Sweden) Magnus Gustafsson	3	3	7	6	1

=== Top half ===
==== Section 1 ====
First round
WC	(West Germany) A Mronz	6	7
WC	(Germany) P Kühnen	2	5
(Sweden) N Kulti	4	6^{4}
(Haiti) R Agénor	6	7
(United States) A Krickstein	4	6	6
16	(Switzerland) M Rosset	6	2	3
9	(Germany) M Stich	1	6	7
(Spain) T Carbonell	6	3	5
Q	(Netherlands) T Nijssen	6	4	6^{4}
(Netherlands) P Haarhuis	3	6	7
Q	(Spain) F Clavet	7	6
(Israel) A Mansdorf	6^{4}	2

Second round
1	(Sweden) S Edberg	6	6
WC	(Germany) A Mronz	3	1
(Haiti) R Agénor	7	0	6
(United States) A Krickstein	5	6	2
9	(Germany) M Stich	7	6
(Netherlands) P Haarhuis	5	0
Q	(Spain) F Clavet	6	4	6
8	(Spain) E Sánchez	3	6	4

Third round
1	(Sweden) S Edberg	6	6
(Haiti) R Agénor	2	1
9	(Germany) M Stich	6	6
Q	(Spain) F Clavet	1	4

Quarterfinal
1	(Sweden) S Edberg	2	6^{4}
9	(Germany) M Stich	6	7

==== Section 2 ====
First round
(Austria) H Skoff	7	6
(Austria) T Muster	5	2
(Italy) O Camporese	7	6
Q	(Germany) R Haas	6^{4}	4
WC	(Germany) C-U Steeb	4	6^{4}
13	(Czechoslovakia) K Nováček	6	7
11	(Ecuador) Gómez	4	3
(Argentina) F Davín	6	6
(Netherlands) M Koevermans	6	6
(Czechoslovakia) M Vajda	3	2
(Argentina) M Jaite	5	3
(Germany) E Jelen	7	6

Second round
3	(United States) P Sampras	6	4	6
(Austria) H Skoff	3	6	4
(Italy) O Camporese	3	2
13	(Czechoslovakia) K Nováček	6	6
(Argentina) F Davín	4	4
(Netherlands) M Koevermans	6	6
(Germany) E Jelen	3	1
5	(Spain) S Bruguera	6	6

Third round
9	(United States) P Sampras	4	2
13	(Czechoslovakia) K Nováček	6	6
(Netherlands) M Koevermans	6	6
5	(Spain) S Bruguera	4	3

Quarterfinal
13	(Czechoslovakia) K Nováček	4	6	6
(Netherlands) M Koevermans	6	4	2

=== Bottom half ===
==== Section 3 ====
First round
(Argentina) H de la Peña	6	3	6
(Sweden) C Bergström	2	6	2
(Spain) J Aguilera	2	5
(Spain) J Arrese	6	7
(Socialist Federal Republic of Yugoslavia) G Prpić	6	6
12	(Soviet Union) A Chesnokov	4	3
14	(Soviet Union) A Volkov	6	7
(Israel) G Bloom	1	6^{12}
(Sweden) A Järryd	4	1
Q	(France) A Boetsch	6	6
WC	(Germany) U Riglewski	1	4
(Brazil) L Mattar	6	6

Second round
6	(United States) J Courier	7	2	4
(Argentina) H de la Peña	6^{3}	6	6
(Spain) J Arrese	3	3
(Socialist Federal Republic of Yugoslavia) G Prpić	6	6
14	(Soviet Union) A Volkov	7	7
Q	(France) A Boetsch	6^{4}	6^{1}
(Brazil) L Mattar	1	1
4	(Socialist Federal Republic of Yugoslavia) G Ivanišević	6	6

Third round
(Argentina) H de la Peña	3	4
(Socialist Federal Republic of Yugoslavia) G Prpić	6	6
14	(Soviet Union) A Volkov	1	3
4	(Socialist Federal Republic of Yugoslavia) G Ivanišević	6	6

Quarterfinal
(Socialist Federal Republic of Yugoslavia) G Prpić	7	3
4	(Socialist Federal Republic of Yugoslavia) G Ivanišević	5	0^{r}

==== Section 4 ====
First round
Q	(Italy) C Pistolesi	3	3
(Italy) C Caratti	6	6
(Sweden) M Gustafsson	6	6
(Sweden) D Engel	4	2
(France) H Leconte	6^{3}	3
10	(Soviet Union) A Cherkasov	7	6
LL	(South Africa) W Ferreira	2	6	3
(Sweden) M Larsson	6	3	6
WC	(France) Y Noah	7	6
(Australia) R Fromberg	6^{6}	0
(Uruguay) M Filippini	3	3
Q	(Italy) R Furlan	6	6

Second round
7	(Sweden) J Svensson	2	2
(Italy) C Caratti	6	6
(Sweden) M Gustafsson	3	6	6
10	(Soviet Union) A Cherkasov	6	4	4
(Sweden) M Larsson	4	6	3
WC	(France) Y Noah	6	1	6
Q	(Italy) R Furlan	7	6
2	(Czechoslovakia) I Lendl	5	4

Third round
(Italy) C Caratti	5	6	2
(Sweden) M Gustafsson	7	3	6
WC	(France) Y Noah	1	6	6
Q	(Italy) R Furlan	6	4	3

Quarterfinal
(Sweden) M Gustafsson	6	6
WC	(France) Y Noah	1	4
