= 1991 ATP German Open – Doubles =

Doubles
- 1991 ATP German Open

Final
- Champion: (Spain) Sergio Casal (Spain) Emilio Sánchez
- Runner-up: (Brazil) Cássio Motta (South Africa) Danie Visser
- Score: 7–6, 7–6

Details
- Draw: 28
- Seeds: 8

Events
Singles	Doubles
← 1990 ·	ATP German Open	· 1992 →

The 1991 German Open was a tennis tournament played on outdoor clay courts and was part of the ATP Championship Series of the 1991 ATP Tour. It took place at the Rothenbaum Tennis Center in Hamburg, Germany, from 6 May until 13 May 1991. Sergio Casal and Emilio Sánchez won in the final against Cássio Motta and Danie Visser, 7–6, 7–6.

== Seeds ==
1. (Spain) Sergio Casal / (Spain) Emilio Sánchez (champions)
2. (West Germany) Udo Riglewski / (West Germany) Michael Stich (Quarterfinal)
3. (United States) Patrick Galbraith / (United States) Todd Witsken (Quarterfinal)
4. (Australia) Broderick Dyke / (Australia) Laurie Warder (second round)
5. (Spain) Sergi Bruguera / (United States) Jim Courier (semifinal)
6. (Netherlands) Mark Koevermans / (Netherlands) Michiel Schapers (first round)
7. (Italy) Omar Camporese / (Australia) Mark Woodforde (first round)
8. (Brazil) Cássio Motta / (South Africa) Danie Visser (final)

== Draw ==
=== Key ===
- Q = Qualifier
- WC = Wild card
- LL = Lucky loser
- Alt = Alternate
- ITF = ITF entry
- PR = Protected ranking
- SR = Special ranking
- SE = Special exempt
- JE = Junior exempt
- JR = Junior Accelerator Programme entrant
- CO = College Accelerator Programme entrant
- NG = Next Gen Accelerator Program entrant
- w/o = Walkover
- r = Retired
- d = Defaulted

=== Finals ===
Semifinal
1	(Spain) Sergio Casal (Spain) Emilio Sánchez	6	6
5	(Spain) Sergi Bruguera (United States) Jim Courier	3	3
(Argentina) Gustavo Luza (Spain) Javier Sánchez	4	4
8	(Brazil) Cássio Motta (South Africa) Danie Visser	6	6

Final
1	(Spain) Sergio Casal (Spain) Emilio Sánchez	4	6	6
8	(Brazil) Cássio Motta (South Africa) Danie Visser	6	3	2

=== Top half ===
First round
(Spain) T Carbonell (South Africa) W Ferreira	7	4	3
(Croatia) G Ivanišević (Croatia) G Prpić	5	6	6
(Czechoslovakia) K Nováček (Belgium) L Pimek	7	3	3
(United States) P McEnroe (United States) P Sampras	5	6	6
(Spain) JC Báguena (Czechoslovakia) V Flégl	1	6	6
7	(Italy) O Camporese (Australia) M Woodforde	6	3	4
(United States) J Brown (United States) S Cannon	1	6
(Sweden) R Båthman (Sweden) R Bergh	6	7
WC	(Iran) M Bahrami (France) H Leconte	3	3
WC	(West Germany) E Jelen (West Germany) C-U Steeb	6	6
(United States) C Beckman (United Kingdom) N Brown	3	2
5	(Spain) S Bruguera (United States) J Courier	6	6

Second round
1	(Spain) S Casal (Spain) E Sánchez	3	7	6
(Croatia) G Ivanišević (Croatia) G Prpić	6	5	4
(United States) P McEnroe (United States) P Sampras	3	7	7
(Spain) JC Báguena (Czechoslovakia) V Flégl	6	6	5
3	(United States) P Galbraith (United States) T Witsken	6	6	6
(Sweden) R Båthman (Sweden) R Bergh	3	7	4
WC	(West Germany) E Jelen (West Germany) C-U Steeb	6	1
5	(Spain) S Bruguera (United States) J Courier	7	6

Quarterfinal
1	(Spain) S Casal (Spain) E Sánchez	7	6
(United States) P McEnroe (United States) P Sampras	6	0
3	(United States) P Galbraith (United States) T Witsken	6	6	3
5	(Spain) S Bruguera (United States) J Courier	7	1	6

Semifinal
1	(Spain) S Casal (Spain) E Sánchez	6	6
5	(Spain) S Bruguera (United States) J Courier	3	3

=== Bottom half ===
First round
6	(Netherlands) M Koevermans (Netherlands) M Schapers	4	5
(Sweden) S Edberg (Czechoslovakia) I Lendl	6	6
(Netherlands) T Nijssen (Czechoslovakia) C Suk	6	6
(The Bahamas) R Smith (Sweden) T Svantesson	4	2
WC	(West Germany) P Kühnen (West Germany) A Mronz	2	2
(Argentina) G Luza (Spain) J Sánchez	6	6
8	(Brazil) C Motta (South Africa) D Visser	6	6
Q	(Sweden) D Engel (Venezuela) A Mora	1	1
(United States) S DeVries (Australia) D Macpherson	6	6
(Mexico) L Lavalle (Mexico) J Lozano	3	2
(Argentina) H de la Peña (Brazil) L Mattar	4	4
Q	(Israel) G Bloom (France) A Boetsch	6	6

Second round
(Sweden) S Edberg (Czechoslovakia) I Lendl
(Netherlands) T Nijssen (Czechoslovakia) C Suk	w/o
(Argentina) G Luza (Spain) J Sánchez	6	7
4	(Australia) B Dyke (Australia) L Warder	4	5
8	(Brazil) C Motta (South Africa) D Visser	7	6
(United States) S DeVries (Australia) D Macpherson	6	2
Q	(Israel) G Bloom (France) A Boetsch	2	6
2	(West Germany) U Riglewski (West Germany) M Stich	6	7

Quarterfinal
(Netherlands) T Nijssen (Czechoslovakia) C Suk	6	6
(Argentina) G Luza (Spain) J Sánchez	7	7
8	(Brazil) C Motta (South Africa) D Visser	4	6	6
2	(West Germany) U Riglewski (West Germany) M Stich	6	4	1

Semifinal
(Argentina) G Luza (Spain) J Sánchez	4	4
8	(Brazil) C Motta (South Africa) D Visser	6	6
