= 1993 Muratti Time Indoor =

Men's tennis tournament

- Date: 8–14 February
- Edition: 16th
- Category: ATP Championship Series
- Draw: 32S / 16D
- Prize money: $675,000
- Surface: Carpet / indoor
- Location: Milan, Italy
- Venue: Assago Forum

Champions

Singles
- (Germany) Boris Becker

Doubles
- (Australia) Mark Kratzmann / (Australia) Wally Masur
- Milan Indoor

The 1993 Muratti Time Indoor, known as such for sponsorship reasons, was a men's tennis tournament played on indoor carpet courts at the Assago Forum in Milan, Italy that was part of the ATP Championship Series of the 1993 ATP Tour. It was the 16th edition of the tournament and was held from 8 February until 14 February 1993. Second-seeded Boris Becker won the singles title, his third at the event after 1987 and 1989.

== Finals ==
=== Singles ===
(Germany) Boris Becker defeated (Spain) Sergi Bruguera, 6–3, 6–3

- It was Becker's 2nd singles title of the year and the 38th of his career.

=== Doubles ===
(Australia) Mark Kratzmann / (Australia) Wally Masur defeated (Netherlands) Tom Nijssen / (Czech Republic) Cyril Suk, 4–6, 6–3, 6–4
