= 1990 Campionati Internazionali di Sicilia – Singles =

Singles
- 1990 Campionati Internazionali di Sicilia

Final
- Champion: (Argentina) Franco Davín
- Runner-up: (Spain) Juan Aguilera
- Score: 6–1, 6–1

Details
- Draw: 32 (1WC/4Q)
- Seeds: 8

Events
Singles	Doubles
← 1989 ·	Campionati Internazionali di Sicilia	· 1991 →

Guillermo Pérez Roldán was the defending champion, but lost in the semifinals to tournament runner-up Juan Aguilera.

Franco Davín won the title by defeating Aguilera 6–1, 6–1 in the final.

== Seeds ==
1. (Spain) Emilio Sánchez (first round)
2. (Argentina) Guillermo Pérez Roldán (semifinals)
3. (Spain) Juan Aguilera (final)
4. (Austria) Horst Skoff (first round)
5. (Spain) Sergi Bruguera (first round)
6. (Italy) Omar Camporese (second round)
7. (Argentina) Franco Davín (champion)
8. (Socialist Federal Republic of Yugoslavia) Goran Prpić (second round)

== Draw ==
=== Key ===
- Q = Qualifier
- WC = Wild card
- LL = Lucky loser
- Alt = Alternate
- ITF = ITF entry
- PR = Protected ranking
- SR = Special ranking
- SE = Special exempt
- JE = Junior exempt
- JR = Junior Accelerator Programme entrant
- CO = College Accelerator Programme entrant
- NG = Next Gen Accelerator Program entrant
- w/o = Walkover
- r = Retired
- d = Defaulted

=== Finals ===
Semifinals
7	(Argentina) Franco Davín	6	4	7
(France) Thierry Champion	1	6	5
3	(Spain) Juan Aguilera	6	6
2	(Argentina) Guillermo Pérez Roldán	2	3

Final
7	(Argentina) Franco Davín	6	6
3	(Spain) Juan Aguilera	1	1

=== Top half ===
First round
1	(Spain) E Sánchez	6	4
(France) T Benhabiles	7	6
(Czechoslovakia) M Střelba	6	6
WC	(Spain) S Casal	4	1
(Italy) P Canè	3	6	6
(Uruguay) D Pérez	6	4	2
Q	(Italy) A de Minicis	4	1
7	(Argentina) F Davín	6	6
3	(Austria) H Skoff	6	6	1
(Spain) F Clavet	3	7	6
(France) T Champion	6	6
(Argentina) R Azar	3	3
(Belgium) E Masso	3	0^{r}
(Argentina) H de la Peña	6	3
Q	(Spain) MA Górriz	4	4
6	(Italy) O Camporese	6	6

Second round
(France) T Benhabiles	2	6	5^{r}
(Czechoslovakia) M Střelba	6	4	6
(Italy) P Canè	3	4
7	(Argentina) F Davín	6	6
(Spain) F Clavet	4	2
(France) T Champion	6	6
(Argentina) H de la Peña	6	6
6	(Italy) O Camporese	4	4

Quarterfinals
(Czechoslovakia) M Střelba	2	4
7	(Argentina) F Davín	6	6
(France) T Champion	6^{4}	6	6
(Argentina) H de la Peña	7^{7}	1	3

Semifinals
7	(Argentina) F Davín	6	4	7
(France) T Champion	1	6	5

=== Bottom half ===
First round
5	(Spain) S Bruguera	7	2	4
(Italy) C Pistolesi	5	6	6
(Italy) A Gaudenzi	6	4
(Italy) R Furlan	7	6
(Spain) J Sánchez	6	6
(West Germany) J Wöhrmann	3	4
(Italy) S Pescosolido	3	6	1^{r}
3	(Spain) J Aguilera	6	4	3
8	(Socialist Federal Republic of Yugoslavia) G Prpić	6	6
Q	(Italy) F Mordegan	0	3
Q	(Sweden) C Allgårdh	1	3
(Czechoslovakia) M Vajda	6	6
(Spain) T Carbonell	6	6
(United States) L Duncan	3	2
(United States) J Tarango	1	2
2	(Argentina) G Pérez Roldán	6	6

Second round
(Italy) C Pistolesi	6	6
(Italy) R Furlan	2	4
(Spain) J Sánchez	6	4
3	(Spain) J Aguilera	7	6
8	(Socialist Federal Republic of Yugoslavia) G Prpić	6	6	2
(Czechoslovakia) M Vajda	7	3	6
(Spain) T Carbonell	6	4
2	(Argentina) G Pérez Roldán	7	6

Quarterfinals
(Italy) C Pistolesi	4	4
3	(Spain) J Aguilera	6	6
(Czechoslovakia) M Vajda	4	6
2	(Argentina) G Pérez Roldán	6	7

Semifinals
3	(Spain) J Aguilera	6	6
2	(Argentina) G Pérez Roldán	2	3
