= 1993 Athens International =

- Date: 4–11 October
- Edition: 8th
- Category: World Series
- Draw: 32S / 16D
- Prize money: $175,000
- Surface: Clay / outdoor
- Location: Athens, Greece

Champions

Singles
- (Spain) Jordi Arrese

Doubles
- (Argentina) Horacio de la Peña / (Mexico) Jorge Lozano
← 1992 ·	ATP Athens Open	· 1994 →

The 1993 Athens International was a men's tennis tournament played on outdoor clay courts in Athens, Greece that was part of the World Series of the 1993 ATP Tour. It was the 8th edition of the tournament and was held from 4 October until 11 October 1993. Unseeded Jordi Arrese won his second consecutive singles title at the event.

== Finals ==
=== Singles ===
(Spain) Jordi Arrese defeated (Spain) Alberto Berasategui 6–4, 3–6, 6–3

- It was Arrese's only title of the year and the 9th of his career.

=== Doubles ===
(Argentina) Horacio de la Peña / (Mexico) Jorge Lozano defeated (South Africa) Royce Deppe / (United States) John Sullivan 3–6, 6–1, 6–2

- It was de la Peña's 2nd title of the year and the 10th of his career. It was Lozano's only title of the year and the 9th of his career.
