= 1991 Davis Cup Europe Zone Group II =

International tennis competition

The Europe/Africa Zone was one of the three zones of the regional Davis Cup competition in 1991.

In the Europe/Africa Zone there were two different tiers, called groups, in which teams competed against each other to advance to the upper tier. The winner in the Europe Zone Group II advanced to the Europe/Africa Zone Group I in 1992.

== Participating nations ==
- Bulgaria
- Cyprus
- Greece
- Luxembourg
- Malta
- Monaco
- Norway
- Turkey

=== Draw ===
Quarterfinals; 3–5 May
Oslo, Norway (indoor carpet)
Norway	5
Bulgaria	0
Nicosia, Cyprus (clay)
Greece	5
Cyprus	0
Luxembourg City, Luxembourg (indoor hard)
Luxembourg	5
Monaco	0
Marsa, Malta (hard)
Malta	2
Turkey	3

Second Round; 14–16 June
Oslo, Norway (clay)
Norway	4
Greece	1
Luxembourg City, Luxembourg (indoor hard)
Luxembourg	5
Turkey	0

Third Round; 19–21 July
Oslo, Norway (clay)
Norway	4
Luxembourg	1

- Norway promoted to Group I in 1992.

== First round ==
=== Norway vs. Bulgaria ===
Norway
5
National Tennis Centre, Oslo, Norway
3–5 May 1991
Carpet (indoors)

Bulgaria
0

			1	2	3	4	5
1	(Norway) (Bulgaria)	Anders Håseth; Orlin Stanoytchev	3; 6	6; 1	6; 2	6; 4
2	(Norway) (Bulgaria)	Christian Ruud; Krassimir Lazarov	6; 3	7^{7} 6^{5}	7^{7} 6^{1}
3	(Norway) (Bulgaria)	Arne Georg Raabe / Anders Rolfsen; Krassimir Lazarov / Stefan Tzvetkov	6; 3	6; 2	6; 2
4	(Norway) (Bulgaria)	Anders Håseth; Krassimir Lazarov	6; 2	4; 6	8; 6
5	(Norway) (Bulgaria)	Christian Ruud; Orlin Stanoytchev	6; 2	6; 3

=== Cyprus vs. Greece ===
Cyprus
0
Field Club, Nicosia, Cyprus
3–5 May 1991
Clay

Greece
5

			1	2	3	4	5
1	(Cyprus) (Greece)	Alkis Papamichael; Andreas Fikas	4; 6	4; 6	2; 6
2	(Cyprus) (Greece)	Yiannos Hadjigeorgiou; Anastasios Bavelas	2; 6	1; 6	4; 6
3	(Cyprus) (Greece)	Spyros Charalambous / Savvas Constantinou; Anastasios Bavelas / Ioannis Rigas	1; 6	0; 6	1; 6
4	(Cyprus) (Greece)	Alkis Papamichael; Anastasios Bavelas	1; 6	2; 6
5	(Cyprus) (Greece)	Yiannos Hadjigeorgiou; Andreas Fikas	6^{0} 7^{7}	3; 6

=== Luxembourg vs. Monaco ===
Luxembourg
5
Tennis Club Bonnevoie, Luxembourg City, Luxembourg
3–5 May 1991
Hard (indoors)

Monaco
0

			1	2	3	4	5
1	(Luxembourg) (Monaco)	Johny Goudenbour; Bernard Balleret	6; 1	6; 0	6; 1
2	(Luxembourg) (Monaco)	Jacques Radoux; Jérôme Seguin	6; 4	6; 4	6; 3
3	(Luxembourg) (Monaco)	Serge Brueck / Johny Goudenbour; Olivier Peyret / Jérôme Seguin	6; 3	6; 4	6; 3
4	(Luxembourg) (Monaco)	Johny Goudenbour; Jérôme Seguin	6; 1	6; 3
5	(Luxembourg) (Monaco)	Jacques Radoux; Christian Collange	6; 2	6; 1

=== Malta vs. Turkey ===
Malta
2
Marsa Sports Club, Marsa, Malta
3–5 May 1991
Hard

Turkey
3

			1	2	3	4	5
1	(Malta) (Turkey)	Gordon Asciak; Alaaddin Karagöz	2; 6	6; 4	3; 6	6; 3	2; 6
2	(Malta) (Turkey)	Christopher Gatt; Yavuz Erkangil	7^{7} 6^{3}	6; 2	4; 6	6; 0
3	(Malta) (Turkey)	Gordon Asciak / Christopher Gatt; Mustafa Azkara / Alaaddin Karagöz	6; 2	7^{7} 6^{5}	6; 2
4	(Malta) (Turkey)	Christopher Gatt; Alaaddin Karagöz	6; 4	1; 6	6; 3	6^{3} 7^{7}	7; 9
5	(Malta) (Turkey)	Gordon Asciak; Yavuz Erkangil	6; 2	1; 6	6^{4} 7^{7}	6; 4	4; 6

== Second round ==
=== Norway vs. Greece ===
Norway
4
Oslo Tennisklubb, Oslo, Norway
14–16 June 1991
Clay

Greece
1

			1	2	3	4	5
1	(Norway) (Greece)	Christian Ruud; Anastasios Bavelas	6; 3	6; 2	6; 4
2	(Norway) (Greece)	Bent-Ove Pedersen; George Kalovelonis	6; 4	6; 3	2; 6	3; 6	8; 6
3	(Norway) (Greece)	Bent-Ove Pedersen / Anders Rolfsen; Anastasios Bavelas / George Kalovelonis	6; 2	6; 1	6; 4
4	(Norway) (Greece)	Bent-Ove Pedersen; Anastasios Bavelas	6; 1	5; 7	8; 10
5	(Norway) (Greece)	Christian Ruud; George Kalovelonis	6; 3	3; 6	6; 2

=== Luxembourg vs. Turkey ===
Luxembourg
5
Tennis Club Bonnevoie, Luxembourg City, Luxembourg
14–16 June 1991
Hard (indoors)

Turkey
0

			1	2	3	4	5
1	(Luxembourg) (Turkey)	Johny Goudenbour; Yavuz Erkangil	6; 4	6; 0	6; 4
2	(Luxembourg) (Turkey)	Jacques Radoux; Alaaddin Karagöz	6; 2	6; 1	6; 1
3	(Luxembourg) (Turkey)	Serge Brueck / Johny Goudenbour; Mustafa Azkara / Mert Ertunga	6; 1	6; 2	3; 6	6; 2
4	(Luxembourg) (Turkey)	Johny Goudenbour; Alaaddin Karagöz	6; 2	6; 3
5	(Luxembourg) (Turkey)	Jacques Radoux; Yavuz Erkangil	6; 0	6; 1

== Third round ==
=== Norway vs. Luxembourg ===
Norway
4
Oslo Tennisklubb, Oslo, Norway
19–21 July 1991
Clay

Luxembourg
1

			1	2	3	4	5
1	(Norway) (Luxembourg)	Anders Håseth; Johny Goudenbour	7^{7} 6^{5}	3; 6	6; 3	6; 2
2	(Norway) (Luxembourg)	Christian Ruud; Alberto Paris	6; 3	6; 3	6; 1
3	(Norway) (Luxembourg)	Bent-Ove Pedersen / Anders Rolfsen; Serge Brueck / Alberto Paris	7; 5	6; 3	7; 5
4	(Norway) (Luxembourg)	Bent-Ove Pedersen; Johny Goudenbour	6; 2	6; 1
5	(Norway) (Luxembourg)	Anders Håseth; Jacques Radoux	6^{3} 7^{7}	6^{0} 7^{7}
