= 1990 Campionati Internazionali di Sicilia =

- Date: 24–30 September
- Edition: 12th
- Category: World Series
- Draw: 32S / 16D
- Prize money: $270,000
- Surface: Clay / outdoor
- Location: Palermo, Italy

Champions

Singles
- (Argentina) Franco Davín

Doubles
- (Spain) Sergio Casal / (Spain) Emilio Sánchez
← 1989 ·	Campionati Internazionali di Sicilia	· 1991 →

The 1990 Campionati Internazionali di Sicilia was a men's tennis tournament played on outdoor clay courts in Palermo, Italy that was part of the World Series of the 1990 ATP Tour. It was the 12th edition of the tournament and took place from 24 September until 30 September 1990. Seventh-seeded Franco Davín won the singles title.

== Finals ==
=== Singles ===
(Argentina) Franco Davín defeated (Spain) Juan Aguilera 6–1, 6–1

- It was Davín's 1st singles title of the year and the 2nd of his career.

=== Doubles ===
(Spain) Sergio Casal / (Spain) Emilio Sánchez defeated (Spain) Carlos Costa / (Argentina) Horacio de la Peña 6–3, 6–4
