= 1993 Muratti Time Indoor – Singles =

Singles
- 1993 Muratti Time Indoor

Final
- Champion: (Germany) Boris Becker
- Runner-up: (Spain) Sergi Bruguera
- Score: 6–3, 6–3

Details
- Draw: 32 (3WC/4Q)
- Seeds: 8

Events
Singles	Doubles
- Milan Indoor

Omar Camporese was the defending champion, but lost in the quarterfinals to Sergi Bruguera.

Boris Becker won the title by defeating Bruguera 6–3, 6–3 in the final.

== Seeds ==
1. (Sweden) Stefan Edberg (second round)
2. (Germany) Boris Becker (champion)
3. (Czech Republic) Petr Korda (semifinals)
4. (United States) Ivan Lendl (second round)
5. (France) Guy Forget (first round)
6. (Spain) Carlos Costa (first round)
7. (Netherlands) Richard Krajicek (second round)
8. (Germany) Michael Stich (quarterfinals)

== Draw ==
Key

- Q = Qualifier
- WC = Wild card
- LL = Lucky loser
- Alt = Alternate
- ITF = ITF entry
- PR = Protected ranking
- SR = Special ranking
- SE = Special exempt
- JE = Junior exempt
- JR = Junior Accelerator Programme entrant
- CO = College Accelerator Programme entrant
- NG = Next Gen Accelerator Program entrant
- w/o = Walkover
- r = Retired
- d = Defaulted

=== Finals ===
Semifinals
(Spain) Sergi Bruguera	6	0	7
3	(Czech Republic) Petr Korda	4	6	5
(Australia) Wally Masur	4	6^{2}
2	(Germany) Boris Becker	6	7^{7}

Final
(Spain) Sergi Bruguera	3	3
2	(Germany) Boris Becker	6	6

=== Top half ===
First round
1	(Sweden) S Edberg	6	7
(Ukraine) A Medvedev	3	5
(Italy) O Camporese	4	7^{7}	7^{9}
WC	(Sweden) N Kulti	6	6^{0}	6^{7}
Q	(Haiti) R Agénor	7^{8}	5	3
(Spain) S Bruguera	6^{6}	7	6
(Switzerland) J Hlasek	6	4	1
7	(Netherlands) R Krajicek	4	6	6
3	(Czech Republic) P Korda	6	6
Q	(Germany) D Prinosil	1	3
WC	(Italy) P Canè	2	7^{8}	3
(Switzerland) M Rosset	6	6^{6}	6
(Sweden) M Larsson	6	6
Q	(Germany) A Thoms	3	3
(Italy) S Pescosolido	4	6	6
6	(Spain) C Costa	6	4	0

Second round
1	(Sweden) S Edberg	6^{7}	6	3
(Italy) O Camporese	7^{9}	2	6
(Spain) S Bruguera	6	7^{9}
7	(Netherlands) R Krajicek	4	6^{7}
3	(Czech Republic) P Korda	6	6
(Switzerland) M Rosset	1	4
(Sweden) M Larsson	6	3	6
(Italy) S Pescosolido	4	6	3

Quarterfinals
(Italy) O Camporese	2	6	2
(Spain) S Bruguera	6	1	6
3	(Czech Republic) P Korda	7	6
(Sweden) M Larsson	5	4

Semifinals
(Spain) S Bruguera	6	0	7
3	(Czech Republic) P Korda	4	6	5

=== Bottom half ===
First round
5	(France) G Forget	6^{4}	3
(Netherlands) J Siemerink	7^{7}	6
WC	(Italy) G Pozzi	6	5	0
(France) A Boetsch	4	7	6
(Australia) W Masur	3	7^{7}	6
(Croatia) G Prpić	6	6^{5}	1
Q	(Italy) D Nargiso	7^{7}	6^{2}	6^{6}
4	(United States) I Lendl	6^{1}	7^{7}	7^{8}
8	(Germany) M Stich	4	7^{8}	6
(Czech Republic) K Nováček	6	6^{6}	0
(Russia) A Cherkasov	1	3
(Russia) A Volkov	6	6
(South Africa) W Ferreira	7^{7}	4	6
(France) C Pioline	6^{3}	6	3
(Germany) CU Steeb	6^{0}	3
2	(Germany) B Becker	7^{7}	6

Second round
(Netherlands) J Siemerink	6	3	3
(France) A Boetsch	3	6	6
(Australia) W Masur	7^{7}	4	6
4	(United States) I Lendl	6^{1}	6	4
8	(Germany) M Stich	6	3	7^{8}
(Russia) A Volkov	2	6	6^{6}
(South Africa) W Ferreira	5	3
2	(Germany) B Becker	7	6

Quarterfinals
(France) A Boetsch	5	2
(Australia) W Masur	7	6
8	(Germany) M Stich	2	2
2	(Germany) B Becker	6	6

Semifinals
(Australia) W Masur	4	6^{2}
2	(Germany) B Becker	6	7^{7}
