= 1993 Muratti Time Indoor – Doubles =

Doubles
- 1993 Muratti Time Indoor

Final
- Champions: (Australia) Mark Kratzmann (Australia) Wally Masur
- Runners-up: (Netherlands) Tom Nijssen (Czech Republic) Cyril Suk
- Score: 4–6, 6–3, 6–4

Details
- Draw: 32
- Seeds: 8

Events
Singles	Doubles
- Milan Indoor

Neil Broad and David Macpherson were the defending champions, but both players chose to compete at Memphis with different partners.

Mark Kratzmann and Wally Masur won the title by defeating Tom Nijssen and Cyril Suk 4–6, 6–3, 6–4 in the final.

== Seeds ==
1. (United States) Kelly Jones / (United States) Rick Leach (first round)
2. (Switzerland) Jakob Hlasek / (Switzerland) Marc Rosset (quarterfinals)
3. (Australia) Mark Kratzmann / (Australia) Wally Masur (champions)
4. (Canada) Grant Connell / (United States) Patrick Galbraith (semifinals)

== Draw ==
Key

- Q = Qualifier
- WC = Wild card
- LL = Lucky loser
- Alt = Alternate
- ITF = ITF entry
- PR = Protected ranking
- SR = Special ranking
- SE = Special exempt
- JE = Junior exempt
- JR = Junior Accelerator Programme entrant
- CO = College Accelerator Programme entrant
- NG = Next Gen Accelerator Program entrant
- w/o = Walkover
- r = Retired
- d = Defaulted

=== Draw ===
First round
1	(United States) K Jones (United States) R Leach	7	6	4
(Netherlands) T Nijssen (Czech Republic) C Suk	6	7	6
(Netherlands) HJ Davids (Belgium) L Pimek	6	6
(France) G Forget (Germany) M Stich	4	3
4	(Canada) G Connell (United States) P Galbraith	4	6	6
(Czech Republic) P Korda (Czech Republic) K Nováček	6	3	4
(Italy) P Canè (Italy) S Pescosolido	3	6
(South Africa) D Adams (Netherlands) M Oosting	6	7
(Sweden) R Båthman (Sweden) R Bergh	6	1	2
(Italy) O Camporese (Australia) J Fitzgerald	4	6	6
(Germany) D Prinosil (South Africa) B Talbot	3	2
3	(Australia) M Kratzmann (Australia) W Masur	6	6
(South Africa) W Ferreira (South Africa) P Norval	3	7	3
(South Africa) G Muller (Italy) D Nargiso	6	5	6
Q	(Portugal) J Cunha e Silva (Venezuela) N Pereira	2	4
2	(Switzerland) J Hlasek (Switzerland) M Rosset	6	6

Quarterfinals
(Netherlands) T Nijssen (Czech Republic) C Suk	6	6
(Netherlands) HJ Davids (Belgium) L Pimek	3	1
4	(Canada) G Connell (United States) P Galbraith	7	3	7
(South Africa) D Adams (Netherlands) M Oosting	5	6	6
(Italy) O Camporese (Australia) J Fitzgerald	3	2
3	(Australia) M Kratzmann (Australia) W Masur	6	6
(South Africa) G Muller (Italy) D Nargiso	7	6
2	(Switzerland) J Hlasek (Switzerland) M Rosset	5	4

Semifinals
(Netherlands) T Nijssen (Czech Republic) C Suk	7	4	6
4	(Canada) G Connell (United States) P Galbraith	5	6	4
3	(Australia) M Kratzmann (Australia) W Masur	7	7
(South Africa) G Muller (Italy) D Nargiso	6	6

Final
(Netherlands) T Nijssen (Czech Republic) C Suk	6	3	4
3	(Australia) M Kratzmann (Australia) W Masur	4	6	6
