= John Sullivan (tennis) =

American tennis player

- Country (sports): United States
- Residence: Rockville Centre, New York
- Born: December 22, 1966 (age 59)
- Height: 6 ft 2 in (1.88 m)
- Plays: Right-handed
- Prize money: $59,854

Singles
- Career record: 1-2
- Career titles: 0
- Highest ranking: No. 371 (November 28, 1994)

Grand Slam singles results
- Australian Open: 1R (1994)

Doubles
- Career record: 9-21
- Career titles: 0
- Highest ranking: No. 101 (November 8, 1993)

Grand Slam doubles results
- Australian Open: 2R (1994)
- French Open: 1R (1994)

John Sullivan (born December 22, 1966) is a former professional tennis player from the United States.

== Career ==
Sullivan attended Clemson University in South Carolina in the late 1980s and was a doubles All-American in 1987.

He made one ATP Tour final, the 1993 Athens International, where he and Royce Deppe were doubles runners-up.

At the 1994 Australian Open, Sullivan made it through qualifying and was drawn against Todd Woodbridge in the opening round. He won the first two sets and took the third into a tiebreak, but lost in five sets. In the men's doubles he and partner Donald Johnson defeated eighth seeds Scott Melville and Gary Muller in the first round, before losing in the second. His only other Grand Slam appearance came at the 1994 French Open, where he and Kenny Thorne were beaten in the first round of the men's doubles.

== ATP Tour career finals ==
=== Doubles: 1 (0–1) ===
Result	No.	Date	Tournament	Surface	Partner	Opponents	Score
Loss	1.	Oct 1993	Athens, Greece	Clay	(South Africa) Royce Deppe	(Argentina) Horacio De La Peña (Mexico) Jorge Lozano	6–3, 1–6, 2–6

== Challenger titles ==
=== Doubles: (2) ===
No.	Year	Tournament	Surface	Partner	Opponents	Score
1.	1992	Gramado, Brazil	Hard	(United States) Richard Matuszewski	(Brazil) Nelson Aerts (Brazil) Fernando Roese	7–6, 6–7, 6–3
2.	1993	Caracas, Venezuela	Hard	(United States) Richard Matuszewski	(United States) Doug Flach (Venezuela) Nicolás Pereira	7–6, 7–5
