= 1994 Athens International =

- Date: 3–10 October
- Edition: 9th
- Category: World Series
- Draw: 32S / 16D
- Prize money: $188,750
- Surface: Clay / outdoor
- Location: Athens, Greece

Champions

Singles
- (Spain) Alberto Berasategui

Doubles
- (Argentina) Luis Lobo / (Spain) Javier Sánchez
← 1993 ·	ATP Athens Open

The 1994 Athens International was a men's tennis tournament played on outdoor clay courts in Athens, Greece that was part of the World Series of the 1994 ATP Tour. It was the ninth and last edition of the tournament and was held from 3 October until 10 October 1994. First-seeded Alberto Berasategui won the singles title.

== Finals ==
=== Singles ===
(Spain) Alberto Berasategui defeated (Spain) Oscar Martinez 4–6, 7–6^{(7–4)}, 6–3

- It was Berasategui's 5th title of the year and the 6th of his career.

=== Doubles ===
(Argentina) Luis Lobo / (Spain) Javier Sánchez defeated (Italy) Cristian Brandi / (Italy) Federico Mordegan 5–7, 6–1, 6–4

- It was Lobo's only title of the year and the 1st of his career. It was Sánchez's 2nd title of the year and the 20th of his career.
