= Pantelis Moschoutis =

Greek tennis player

- Country (sports): Greece
- Born: 6 December 1974 (age 50); Athens, Greece

Singles
- Career record: 0–1
- Highest ranking: No. 471 (12 May 1997)

Grand Slam singles results
- Australian Open: Q1 (1997)

Doubles
- Career record: 0–1
- Highest ranking: No. 663 (23 Oct 1995)

Pantelis Moschoutis (born 6 December 1974) is a Greek former professional tennis player.

Born in Athens, Moschoutis twice finished runner-up in the Greece's national championships and played in six Davis Cup rubbers for Greece during the 1990s. He had a best singles world ranking of 471 and made his only ATP Tour main draw appearance came at the 1994 Athens International, where he lost in the first round to Marcelo Ríos.
