= Olli Rahnasto =

Finnish tennis player

- Country (sports): Finland
- Born: 28 December 1965 (age 59); Seinäjoki, Finland
- Height: 1.83 m (6 ft 0 in)
- Plays: Right-handed
- Prize money: $245,624

Singles
- Career record: 11–26
- Career titles: 0
- Highest ranking: No. 88 (13 Feb 1989)

Grand Slam singles results
- French Open: 2R (1989)
- Wimbledon: 1R (1989)
- US Open: 2R (1989)

Doubles
- Career record: 46–72
- Career titles: 2
- Highest ranking: No. 79 (26 May 1986)

Grand Slam doubles results
- Australian Open: 1R (1993)
- French Open: 2R (1989)
- Wimbledon: 2R (1988, 1992)
- US Open: 2R (1986, 1992)

Olli Rahnasto (born 28 December 1965) is a retired professional tennis player from Finland.

Rahnasto turned pro in 1982. During his career, he won two ATP Tour doubles titles and reached a career high doubles ranking of No. 79 in 1986. He was a member of the Finland Davis Cup team, and led the team to the World Group Qualifying round in 1990. He retired in 1995.

== ATP Tour finals ==
=== Doubles (2 wins, 2 losses) ===
Result	W/L	Date	Tournament	Surface	Partner	Opponents	Score
Win	1–0	Aug 1985	Cleveland, United States	Hard	(Finland) Leo Palin	(United States) Hank Pfister (United States) Ben Testerman	6–3, 6–7, 7–6
Loss	1–1	Oct 1991	Athens, Greece	Clay	(Netherlands) Menno Oosting	(Netherlands) Jacco Eltingh (Netherlands) Mark Koevermans	7–5, 6–7, 5–7
Loss	1–2	Aug 1992	Long Island, United States	Hard	(Italy) Gianluca Pozzi	(United States) Francisco Montana (United States) Greg Van Emburgh	4–6, 2–6
Win	2–2	Aug 1993	San Marino	Clay	(Argentina) Daniel Orsanic	(Argentina) Juan Garat (Argentina) Roberto Saad	6–4, 1–6, 6–3

== See also ==
- List of Finland Davis Cup team representatives
