= Franco Davín =

Argentine tennis player

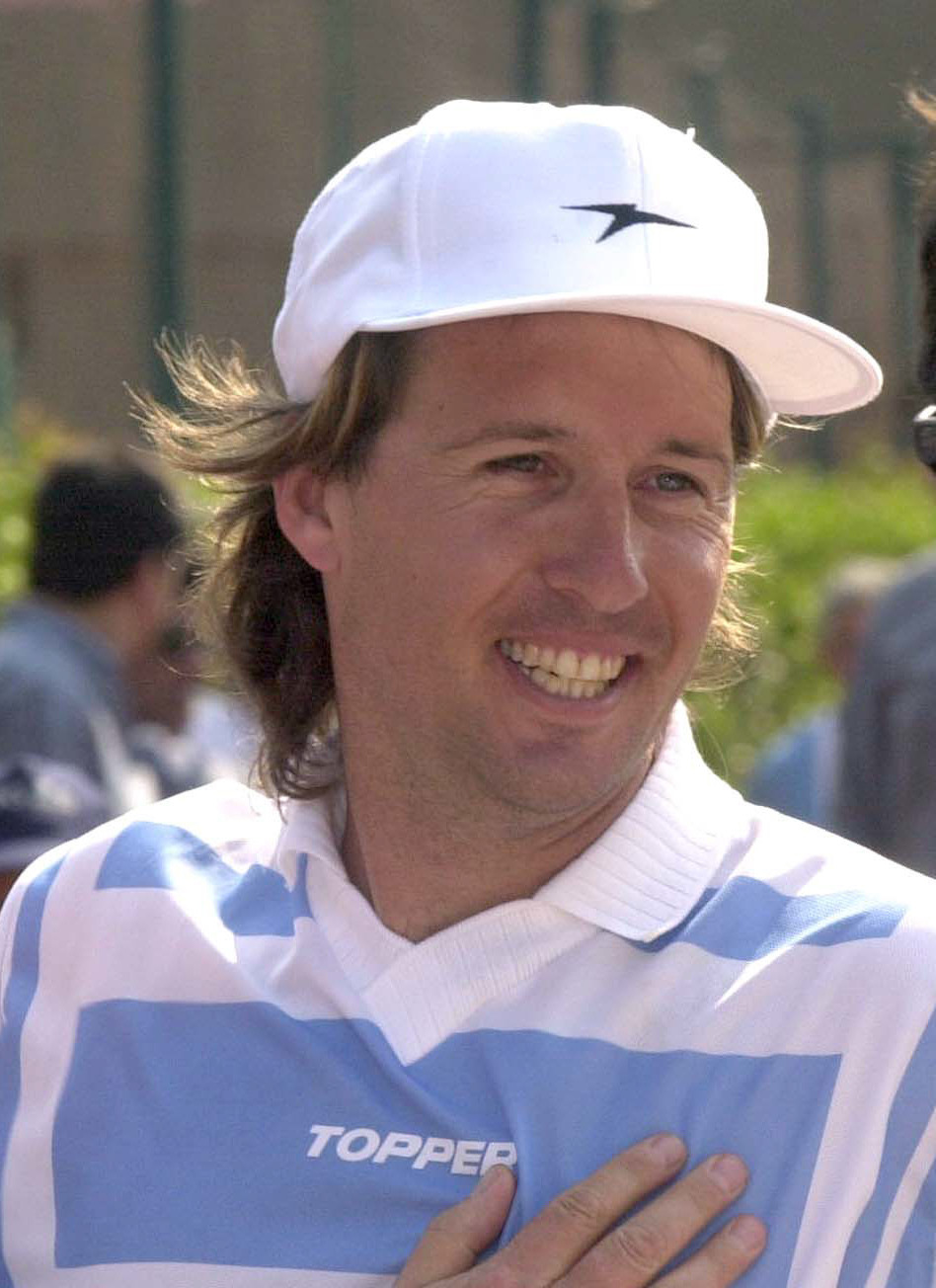
- Country (sports): Argentina
- Residence: Buenos Aires, Argentina
- Born: January 11, 1970 (age 56) Pehuajó, Argentina
- Height: 1.73 m (5 ft 8 in)
- Turned pro: 1986
- Retired: 1997
- Plays: Left-handed (one-handed backhand)
- Prize money: $1,101,560

Singles
- Career record: 153–155
- Career titles: 3
- Highest ranking: No. 30 (8 October 1990)

Grand Slam singles results
- French Open: QF (1991)
- US Open: 3R (1990)

Doubles
- Career record: 11–28
- Career titles: 0
- Highest ranking: No. 255 (9 September 1991)

Grand Slam doubles results
- French Open: 1R (1987)
- Last updated on: 26 November 2021.

Franco Davín (Spanish pronunciation: [ˈfɾaŋko ðaˈβin]; (Note: In isolation, Davín is pronounced [daˈβin].) born January 11, 1970) is an Argentine tennis coach and former professional player.

Davín won three singles tournaments on the ATP Tour, and reached a career-high singles ranking of World No. 30 in October 1990. Davín won his first ATP-tour match at 15 years, 1 month against Hans Gildemeister in Buenos Aires. He holds the Open Era record for being the youngest player to win a tour level main draw match.

== Career ==
=== Juniors ===
Davín had an excellent junior career, reaching the US Open Boys' Singles final and winning the French Open Boys' Doubles (both in 1986).

=== Pro tour ===
Turning professional in 1987, Davín's best slam performance was reaching the quarterfinals of the 1991 French Open, where he defeated experienced clay-courter Martín Jaite as well as Christian Bergström, Marián Vajda and Arnaud Boetsch en route before losing to Michael Stich.

== Coaching career ==
Davín coached Gastón Gaudio when he won the 2004 French Open winning against Guillermo Coria, whom he coached also at one time.

Davin also coached fellow countryman Juan Martín del Potro until July 2015, and was the captain of the Argentine Davis Cup team. Under Davín's tutelage, Del Potro won the 2009 US Open, defeating Rafael Nadal in the semifinals and Roger Federer in the final en route to the championship title.

He coached Grigor Dimitrov on a trial basis for 9 months from September 2015 until June 2016.

After that he coached Fabio Fognini for three years 2016–2019, when he captured the Rolex Monte-Carlo Masters title and reached a career-high ranking of World No. 9 in 2019. He then coached Kyle Edmund in 2020. From November 2020 until 2021, he coached Cristian Garín. From mid 2022 until 2023, he coached Brandon Nakashima on a part-time basis and then also coached WTA player Veronika Kudermetova at the same time.

Since March 2025 he is coaching João Fonseca in a “consultant” role.

== Personal life ==
Davín resides in Key Biscayne with his wife Mariana, his daughter Juana, and his son Nacho.

In June 2020, Davín tested positive for COVID-19.

== Junior Grand Slam finals ==
=== Singles: 1 (1 runner-up) ===
Result	Year	Championship	Surface	Opponent	Score
Loss	1986	US Open	Hard	(Spain) Javier Sánchez	2–6, 2–6

=== Doubles: 1 (1 runner-up) ===
Result	Year	Championship	Surface	Partner	Opponents	Score
Loss	1987	French Open	Clay	(Argentina) Guillermo Pérez Roldán	(United States) Jim Courier (United States) Jonathan Stark	7–6, 4–6, 3–6

== ATP career finals ==
=== Singles: 9 (3 titles, 6 runner-ups) ===
Legend Grand Slam Tournaments (0–0) ATP World Tour Finals (0–0) ATP Masters Series (0–0) ATP Championship Series (0–0) ATP World Series (3–6)	Finals by surface Hard (0–0) Clay (3–6) Grass (0–0) Carpet (0–0)	Finals by setting Outdoors (3–6) Indoors (0–0)

Result	W–L	Date	Tournament	Tier	Surface	Opponent	Score
Loss	0–1	Nov 1986	Buenos Aires, Argentina	Grand Prix	Clay	(United States) Jay Berger	3–6, 3–6
Loss	0–2	Jun 1989	Bologna, Italy	Grand Prix	Clay	(Spain) Javier Sánchez	1–6, 0–6
Win	1–2	Aug 1989	St. Vincent, Italy	Grand Prix	Clay	(Spain) Juan Aguilera	6–2, 6–2
Loss	1–3	Apr 1990	Estoril, Portugal	World Series	Clay	(Spain) Emilio Sánchez	3–6, 1–6
Win	2–3	Sep 1990	Palermo, Italy	World Series	Clay	(Spain) Juan Aguilera	6–1, 6–1
Loss	2–4	Oct 1990	Athens, Greece	World Series	Clay	(Netherlands) Mark Koevermans	7–5, 4–6, 1–6
Loss	2–5	Aug 1992	Prague, Czech Republic	World Series	Clay	(Czech Republic) Karel Nováček	1–6, 1–6
Loss	2–6	Aug 1992	Umag, Croatia	World Series	Clay	(Austria) Thomas Muster	1–6, 6–4, 4–6
Win	3–6	Sep 1994	Bucharest, Romania	World Series	Clay	(Croatia) Goran Ivanišević	6–2, 6–4

== ATP Challenger and ITF Futures finals ==
=== Singles: 6 (4–2) ===
Legend ATP Challenger (4–2) ITF Futures (0–0)	Finals by surface Hard (0–0) Clay (4–2) Grass (0–0) Carpet (0–0)

Result	W–L	Date	Tournament	Tier	Surface	Opponent	Score
Loss	0–1	Apr 1990	Oporto, Portugal	Challenger	Clay	(Netherlands) Mark Koevermans	3–6, 3–6
Win	1–1	Apr 1992	Parioli, Italy	Challenger	Clay	(Spain) Francisco Roig	6–1, 6–4
Win	2–1	Jun 1992	Turin, Italy	Challenger	Clay	(Italy) Renzo Furlan	7–6, 3–6, 6–1
Win	3–1	Sep 1993	Oporto, Portugal	Challenger	Clay	(Argentina) Gabriel Markus	6–4, 6–3
Win	4–1	Feb 1994	Punta del Este, Uruguay	Challenger	Clay	(France) Gérard Solvès	6–2, 4–6, 6–0
Loss	4–2	Mar 1994	Agadir, Morocco	Challenger	Clay	(Morocco) Younes El Aynaoui	3–6, 6–1, 3–6

=== Doubles: 1 (0–1) ===
Legend ATP Challenger (0–1) ITF Futures (0–0)	Finals by surface Hard (0–0) Clay (0–1) Grass (0–0) Carpet (0–0)

Result	W–L	Date	Tournament	Tier	Surface	Partner	Opponents	Score
Loss	0–1	Sep 1991	Venice, Italy	Challenger	Clay	(Uruguay) Marcelo Filippini	(Spain) Jordi Arrese (Spain) Francisco Roig	3–6, 2–6

== Performance timeline ==
Key
W	F	SF	QF	#R	RR	Q#	DNQ	A	NH

(W) winner; (F) finalist; (SF) semifinalist; (QF) quarterfinalist; (#R) rounds 4, 3, 2, 1; (RR) round-robin stage; (Q#) qualification round; (DNQ) did not qualify; (A) absent; (NH) not held; (SR) strike rate (events won / competed); (W–L) win–loss record.

=== Singles ===
Tournament	1987	1988	1989	1990	1991	1992	1993	1994	1995	1996	SR	W–L	Win%
Grand Slam tournaments
Australian Open	A	A	A	A	A	A	A	A	A	A	0 / 0	0–0	–
French Open	3R	1R	A	3R	QF	1R	1R	1R	A	Q3	0 / 7	8–7	53%
Wimbledon	A	A	A	A	A	A	A	A	A	A	0 / 0	0–0	–
US Open	A	A	A	3R	A	1R	A	1R	A	A	0 / 3	2–3	40%
Win–loss	2–1	0–1	0–0	4–2	4–1	0–2	0–1	0–2	0–0	0–0	0 / 10	10–10	50%
ATP Masters Series
Miami	A	A	1R	A	2R	A	A	A	A	A	0 / 2	0–2	0%
Monte Carlo	A	A	A	A	1R	A	1R	A	A	A	0 / 2	0–2	0%
Rome	1R	1R	1R	1R	1R	A	1R	A	A	A	0 / 6	0–6	0%
Hamburg	1R	A	2R	QF	2R	A	1R	A	A	A	0 / 5	5–5	50%
Win–loss	0–2	0–1	1–3	3–2	1–4	0–0	0–3	0–0	0–0	0–0	0 / 15	5–15	25%

== Notes ==
Preceded by: (Argentina) Daniel Garcia; (Argentina) Alejandro Gattiker	Davis Cup Argentina captain 1999; 2000–2001	Succeeded by: (Argentina) Alejandro Gattiker; (Argentina) Alejandro Gattiker
