= Tom Kempers =

Dutch tennis player (born 1969)

- Country (sports): Netherlands
- Born: 1 June 1969 (age 56) Bussum, Netherlands
- Height: 1.85 m (6 ft 1 in)
- Plays: Right-handed
- Prize money: $494,330

Singles
- Career record: 2–7
- Career titles: 0
- Highest ranking: No. 253 (28 February 1994)

Grand Slam singles results
- Wimbledon: 1R (1996)

Doubles
- Career record: 113–134
- Career titles: 4
- Highest ranking: No. 42 (10 August 1998)

Grand Slam doubles results
- Australian Open: 3R (1997)
- French Open: 3R (1997)
- Wimbledon: 3R (1992, 1996)
- US Open: 2R (1995, 1996, 1997)

Tom Kempers (born 1 June 1969) is a former tennis player from the Netherlands. Kempers won four doubles titles during his professional career. He reached his highest doubles ATP ranking on 10 August 1998, when he became the number 42 in the world, though he never won a singles title in his career. Kempers currently is a sponsor relationship manager of the foundation spieren voor spieren that supports research on neuromuscular diseases.

== Career finals ==
=== Doubles (4 titles, 2 runner-ups) ===
| Result | W–L | Date | Tournament | Surface | Partner | Opponents | Score |
|---|---|---|---|---|---|---|---|
| Loss | 0–1 | Oct 1990 | Athens, Greece | Clay | (Netherlands) Richard Krajicek | (Spain) Sergio Casal (Spain) Javier Sánchez | 6–4, 6–7, 3–6 |
| Win | 1–1 | Sep 1991 | Palermo, Italy | Clay | (Netherlands) Jacco Eltingh | (Spain) Emilio Sánchez (Spain) Javier Sánchez | 3–6, 6–3, 6–3 |
| Win | 2–1 | Oct 1994 | Palermo, Italy | Clay | (United States) Jack Waite | (United Kingdom) Neil Broad (United States) Greg Van Emburgh | 7–6, 6–4 |
| Loss | 2–2 | Oct 1995 | Valencia, Spain | Clay | (United States) Jack Waite | (Spain) Tomás Carbonell (Spain) Francisco Roig | 5–7, 3–6 |
| Win | 3–2 | Mar 1998 | Copenhagen, Denmark | Carpet | (Netherlands) Menno Oosting | (Netherlands) Jan Siemerink (New Zealand) Brett Steven | 6–4, 7–6 |
| Win | 4–2 | Aug 1998 | Kitzbühel, Austria | Clay | (Argentina) Daniel Orsanic | (Australia) Joshua Eagle (Australia) Andrew Kratzmann | 6–3, 6–4 |
