= Sergi Bruguera =

Spanish tennis player (born 1971)

- Country (sports): Spain
- Residence: Barcelona, Spain
- Born: 16 January 1971 (age 55) Barcelona, Spain
- Height: 1.88 m (6 ft 2 in)
- Turned pro: 1988
- Retired: 2002
- Plays: Right-handed (two-handed backhand)
- Prize money: US$11,632,199

Singles
- Career record: 447–271 (62.3%)
- Career titles: 14
- Highest ranking: No. 3 (1 August 1994)

Grand Slam singles results
- Australian Open: 4R (1993)
- French Open: W (1993, 1994)
- Wimbledon: 4R (1994)
- US Open: 4R (1994, 1997)

Other tournaments
- Tour Finals: SF (1994)
- Grand Slam Cup: QF (1993, 1994)
- Olympic Games: F (1996)

Doubles
- Career record: 49–50 (49.5%)
- Career titles: 3
- Highest ranking: No. 49 (6 May 1991)

Grand Slam doubles results
- French Open: 3R (1990)
- US Open: QF (1990)
Medal record
Representing Spain
Olympic Games
Silver medal – second place	1996 Atlanta	Singles

Sergi Bruguera Torner (Catalan pronunciation: [ˈsɛɾʒi βɾuˈɣeɾə tuɾˈne]; born 16 January 1971) is a Spanish former professional tennis player and coach. Bruguera won consecutive men's singles titles at the French Open in 1993 and 1994, a silver medal in men's singles at the 1996 Atlanta Olympics, and reached a career-high ranking of world No. 3 in August 1994.

Bruguera is the only player to have a winning record against both Roger Federer and Pete Sampras, leading 3–2 against Sampras and 1–0 against Federer (at the 2000 Barcelona Open).

In 2018, Bruguera became the captain of the Spanish Davis Cup team. He coached Jo-Wilfried Tsonga from 2019 to 2022, Alexander Zverev from 2022 to 2023, and Arthur Fils (with Sébastien Grosjean) from 2023 to 2024.

== Career ==
Bruguera won a total of 14 top-level singles titles and 3 doubles titles. His career-high singles ranking was World No. 3. He is currently the director of the Bruguera Tennis Academy Top Team.

=== Early career ===
Bruguera was Spain's national junior champion in 1987. He turned professional in 1988. In his first full year on the tour, 1989, he won the Cairo Challenger title as a qualifier, defeating Jordi Arrese in the final, and reached the semifinals in Rome. He reached 4th round in the French Open in 1989 and finished the year ranked world No. 26, and was named the ATP's newcomer of the year.

=== 1990–1992: Success on clay ===
Bruguera earned a reputation as a top clay court player in the early 1990s. He reached singles finals in 1990 at Gstaad and Geneva, and captured doubles titles in Hamburg (his 1st ATP Masters 1000 title in doubles) with Jim Courier and in Florence, partnering Horacio de la Peña. In 1991 he reached singles finals at Barcelona and Gstaad along with titles in Estoril, and Athens. He also won Monte Carlo (his 1st ATP Masters 1000 title in singles) beating Boris Becker in the final. "Becker and Bruguera put on a display of tennis that Borg would have been proud of in his glory years". He also won a doubles title at Geneva, partnering Marc Rosset. In 1992 he reached singles finals at Estoril, Bordeaux, and Athens along with titles in Madrid, Gstaad and Palermo.

=== 1993–1994: Peak ===
Bruguera rose to even further prominence in 1993. During the French Open, Bruguera reached quarterfinals without dropping a set, including a rare triple bagel (6–0, 6–0, 6–0) in the second round against Thierry Champion; As of 2025 this remains the last time a player recorded a triple bagel in a singles match at a Grand Slam event. He then defeated Pete Sampras in 4 sets and Andrei Medvedev in straight sets in the semifinals, Bruguera reached his first Grand Slam final at the French Open, where he faced two-time defending champion and then World No. 2 Jim Courier. Courier was overwhelmingly favoured to win his third title, but ultimately Bruguera won a gruelling five-set final that lasted 4 hours, becoming the first Spaniard to win French Open since Andrés Gimeno in 1972. It was also the last time a man won a Grand Slam singles title with wins over both of the top two seeds until Stanislas Wawrinka won the Australian Open in 2014. He continued his top clay court player reputation by reaching finals at Milan (his first final on Carpet), Barcelona, Madrid, and Palermo, while capturing an additional 4 titles at Monte Carlo (his 2nd ATP Masters 1000 title in singles), Gstaad, Prague, and Bordeaux (his 1st hard court title) besides Roland Garros. He finished the year ranked World No. 4.

In 1994 Bruguera maintained his dominance on clay and successfully defended his title at the French Open while only dropping 2 sets in the entire tournament, defeating Medvedev in straight sets in the quarterfinals and Courier in 4 sets in the semifinals. In the final he faced fellow Spaniard Alberto Berasategui, who hadn't dropped a set en route to the final. Bruguera won in four sets: "against the unflagging groundstrokes of Bruguera, the 23rd ranked Berasategui finally appeared mortal and he lashed out with 65 unforced errors and lost his serve half a dozen times". Bruguera reached finals at Dubai (his 2nd hard court final), Monte Carlo (his 3rd ATP Masters 1000 final in singles), and Madrid, and captured titles at Gstaad and Prague besides Roland Garros. In August he reached his career-high ranking of World No. 3 and finished the year ranked World No. 4. He was the first Spaniard to finish 2 consecutive years in Top 5. It is also his 4th consecutive year winning at least 3 clay titles in singles.

Between 1990 and 1994 he reached 25 top-level clay tournament finals in singles and 3 top-level clay tournament finals in doubles, out of which he captured 13 clay titles in singles and 3 clay titles in doubles.

=== 1995–1996: Decline and ankle injury ===
Bruguera was not able to keep up his dominance on clay like he did the previous years. Coming into 1995 French Open as the two-time defending champion, he only dropped one set en route to semifinals, where he was defeated by 1989 French Open champion Michael Chang in straight sets, ending his 19-match win streak at Roland Garros. He only reached 1 top-level final, which is his 4th Masters 1000 final, his first in Rome (on clay), where he was defeated in 4 sets by Muster. In December, he tore 2 ligaments on his right ankle while training, which put him in an even worse condition and prevented him to make any significant impact during 1996 season.

He returned to competitive playing in February 1996, having not yet fully recovered from the injury. In 1996 French Open Bruguera was taken out by Sampras in an epic 5-set match in the second round. The highlight of the year was when Bruguera won the men's singles silver medal at the 1996 Olympic Games in Atlanta. He was defeated in straight sets in the final by Andre Agassi. It was also the only top-level final he reached this year. His Year-End Ranking slipped from previous year's No. 13 to No. 81 much thanks to his injuries.

=== 1997: Comeback ===
Opening 1997 Bruguera was the first ever opponent of Lleyton Hewitt in the main draw of a Grand Slam tournament, at the Australian Open. Bruguera defeated him in straight sets.

This year Bruguera returned strongly from injury previous season and reached finals at Milan, Key Biscaine (his 5th Masters final and his 1st on hard), and Umag. Bruguera also played an excellent tournament at the French Open reaching the final for the third time, en route to the final he defeated former champion and 2nd Seed Michael Chang in the fourth round, then rising star and future World No. 1 Patrick Rafter in the semifinals. But an almost unknown Brazilian player ranked No. 66 named Gustavo Kuerten, who defeated two former champions and notable players en route to the final, defeated Bruguera in straight sets without much effort, although Bruguera was heavily favoured to win his 3rd title at Roland Garros.

Bruguera earned the ATP's Comeback Player of Year award in 1997 after returning from an ankle injury the previous year and improving his Year-End Ranking from world No. 81 to world No. 8.

=== Later career ===
After 1997, due to injuries, Bruguera was far from his best game. He lost concentration and started to increase his errors during his matches, losing one of his great virtues, his solid style. From 1998 until his retirement the three remarkable showings were the final (1999) and the title (2000) in the Challenger Open Castilla y León (considered best challenger tournament of the world by this date). He also reached the final of the ATP event in San Marino in 2000, losing to fellow Spaniard Alex Calatrava.

== Coaching career ==
Bruguera was selected to captain the Spain Davis Cup team in 2018.

Bruguera became the coach of Jo-Wilfried Tsonga between 2019 and 2022. He then coached Alexander Zverev from May 2022, after he stepped down from his Davis Cup captain role, till the run-up of the 2023 French Open, splitting after the 2023 Mutua Madrid Open due to creative differences.

He co-coached French player Arthur Fils, with Sébastien Grosjean, from the end of 2023 until mid-season 2024.

=== Outside of tennis ===
Bruguera is a long-time fan of the Los Angeles Lakers and would often attend their games while playing at tournaments in the United States. During Miami Masters on 28 March 1997, right after the semifinals where he defeated world No. 1 Sampras, Bruguera sank three shots (layup, free throw, top of key) during a time-out of a game between the Lakers and the Miami Heat to earn US$500. This money was given to ATP Charities in his name. Bruguera has also played semi-professional football in his native Spain.

In a 2006 interview featuring questions from fans by the BBC Sport website, a question was asked about the frequent comparisons between Roger Federer and Sampras. In his reply, Bruguera claimed that Federer is ten times better than Sampras.

== Grand Slam finals ==
=== Singles: 3 (2–1) ===
Result	Year	Championship	Surface	Opponent	Score
Win	1993	French Open	Clay	(United States) Jim Courier	6–4, 2–6, 6–2, 3–6, 6–3
Win	1994	French Open (2)	Clay	(Spain) Alberto Berasategui	6–3, 7–5, 2–6, 6–1
Loss	1997	French Open	Clay	(Brazil) Gustavo Kuerten	3–6, 4–6, 2–6

== Other significant finals ==
=== Olympic Games finals ===
==== Singles: 1 (1 silver medal) ====
Result	Year	Championship	Surface	Opponent	Score
Silver	1996	Olympic Games	Hard	(United States) Andre Agassi	2–6, 3–6, 1–6

=== Masters Series finals ===
==== Singles: 5 (2–3) ====
Result	Year	Tournament	Surface	Opponent	Score
Win	1991	Monte-Carlo Masters	Clay	(Germany) Boris Becker	5–7, 6–4, 7–6^{(6)}, 7–6^{(4)}
Win	1993	Monte-Carlo Masters (2)	Clay	(France) Cédric Pioline	7–6^{(2)}, 6–0
Loss	1994	Monte-Carlo Masters	Clay	(Ukraine) Andrei Medvedev	5–7, 1–6, 3–6
Loss	1995	Italian Open	Clay	(Austria) Thomas Muster	6–3, 6–7^{(5)}, 2–6, 3–6
Loss	1997	Miami Open	Hard	(Austria) Thomas Muster	6–7^{(6)}, 3–6, 1–6

==== Doubles: 1 (1–0) ====
Result	Year	Tournament	Surface	Partner	Opponents	Score
Win	1990	Hamburg Masters, West Germany	Clay	(United States) Jim Courier	(Germany) Udo Riglewski (Germany) Michael Stich	7–6, 6–2

== ATP career finals ==
=== Singles: 35 (14 titles / 21 runner-ups) ===
Legend Grand Slam (2–1) Olympic (0–1) Tennis Masters Cup (0–0) ATP Masters Series (2–3) ATP Championship Series (0–4) ATP Tour (10–12)	Titles by surface Hard (1–3) Grass (0–0) Clay (13–16) Carpet (0–2)

Result	W–L	Date	Tournament	Surface	Opponent	Score
Loss	0–1	Jul 1990	Swiss Open, Switzerland	Clay	(Argentina) Martín Jaite	3–6, 7–6^{(7–5)}, 2–6, 2–6
Loss	0–2	Sep 1990	Geneva Open, Switzerland	Clay	(Austria) Horst Skoff	6–7^{(8–10)}, 6–7^{(4–7)}
Win	1–2	Apr 1991	Portugal Open, Portugal	Clay	(Czech Republic) Karel Nováček	7–6^{(9–7)}, 6–1
Loss	1–3	Apr 1991	Barcelona Open, Spain	Clay	(Spain) Emilio Sánchez	4–6, 6–7^{(7–9)}, 2–6
Win	2–3	Apr 1991	Monte-Carlo Masters, France	Clay	(Germany) Boris Becker	5–7, 6–4, 7–6^{(8–6)}, 7–6^{(7–4)}
Loss	2–4	Jul 1991	Swiss Open, Switzerland	Clay	(Spain) Emilio Sánchez	1–6, 4–6, 4–6
Win	3–4	Oct 1991	Athens Open, Greece	Clay	(Spain) Jordi Arrese	7–5, 6–3
Loss	3–5	Apr 1992	Portugal Open, Portugal	Clay	(Spain) Carlos Costa	6–4, 2–6, 2–6
Win	4–5	May 1992	Madrid Grand Prix, Spain	Clay	(Spain) Carlos Costa	7–6^{(8–6)}, 6–2, 6–2
Win	5–5	Jul 1992	Swiss Open, Switzerland	Clay	(Spain) Francisco Clavet	6–1, 6–4
Loss	5–6	Sep 1992	Bordeaux Open, France	Clay	(Ukraine) Andrei Medvedev	3–6, 6–1, 2–6
Win	6–6	Oct 1992	Sicilian International, Italy	Clay	(Spain) Emilio Sánchez	6–1, 6–3
Loss	6–7	Oct 1992	Athens Open, Greece	Clay	(Spain) Jordi Arrese	5–7, 0–3 retired
Loss	6–8	Feb 1993	Milan Indoor, Italy	Carpet (I)	(Germany) Boris Becker	3–6, 3–6
Loss	6–9	Apr 1993	Barcelona Open, Spain	Clay	(Ukraine) Andrei Medvedev	7–6^{(9–7)}, 3–6, 5–7, 4–6
Win	7–9	Apr 1993	Monte-Carlo Masters, France	Clay	(France) Cédric Pioline	7–6^{(7–2)}, 6–0
Loss	7–10	May 1993	Madrid Open, Spain	Clay	(Sweden) Stefan Edberg	3–6, 3–6, 2–6
Win	8–10	Jun 1993	French Open, France	Clay	(United States) Jim Courier	6–4, 2–6, 6–2, 3–6, 6–3
Win	9–10	Jul 1993	Swiss Open, Switzerland	Clay	(Czech Republic) Karel Nováček	6–3, 6–4
Win	10–10	Aug 1993	Prague Open, Czech Republic	Clay	(Russia) Andrei Chesnokov	7–5, 6–4
Win	11–10	Sep 1993	Bordeaux Open, France	Hard	(Italy) Diego Nargiso	7–5, 6–2
Loss	11–11	Oct 1993	Sician International, Italy	Clay	(Austria) Thomas Muster	6–7^{(2–7)}, 5–7
Loss	11–12	Feb 1994	Dubai Championships, UAE	Hard	(Sweden) Magnus Gustafsson	4–6, 2–6
Loss	11–13	Apr 1994	Monte-Carlo Masters, France	Clay	(Ukraine) Andrei Medvedev	5–7, 1–6, 3–6
Loss	11–14	May 1994	Madrid Open, Spain	Clay	(Austria) Thomas Muster	2–6, 6–3, 4–6, 5–7
Win	12–14	Jun 1994	French Open, France	Clay	(Spain) Alberto Berasategui	6–3, 7–5, 2–6, 6–1
Win	13–14	Jul 1994	Swiss Open, Switzerland	Clay	(France) Guy Forget	3–6, 7–5, 6–2, 6–1
Win	14–14	Aug 1994	Prague Open, Czech Republic	Clay	(Ukraine) Andrei Medvedev	6–3, 6–4
Loss	14–15	May 1995	Italian Open, Italy	Clay	(Austria) Thomas Muster	6–3, 6–7^{(5–7)}, 2–6, 3–6
Loss	14–16	Jul 1996	Atlanta Olympics, US	Hard	(United States) Andre Agassi	2–6, 3–6, 1–6
Loss	14–17	Mar 1997	Italian Indoor, Italy	Carpet (I)	(Croatia) Goran Ivanišević	2–6, 2–6
Loss	14–18	Mar 1997	Miami Open, US	Hard	(Austria) Thomas Muster	6–7^{(6–8)}, 3–6, 1–6
Loss	14–19	Jun 1997	French Open, France	Clay	(Brazil) Gustavo Kuerten	3–6, 4–6, 2–6
Loss	14–20	Jul 1997	Croatia Open, Croatia	Clay	(Spain) Félix Mantilla	3–6, 5–7
Loss	14–21	Jul 2000	San Marino Open, Italy	Clay	(Spain) Álex Calatrava	6–7^{(7–9)}, 6–1, 4–6

=== Doubles: 3 (3–0) ===
Result	W–L	Date	Tournament	Surface	Partner	Opponents	Score
Win	1–0	May 1990	German Open, West Germany	Clay	(United States) Jim Courier	(Germany) Udo Riglewski (Germany) Michael Stich	7–6, 6–2
Win	2–0	Jun 1990	Florence Open, Italy	Clay	(Argentina) Horacio de la Peña	(Brazil) Luiz Mattar (Uruguay) Diego Pérez	3–6, 6–3, 6–4
Win	3–0	Sep 1991	Geneva Open, Switzerland	Clay	(Switzerland) Marc Rosset	(Sweden) Per Henricsson (Sweden) Ola Jonsson	3–6, 6–3, 6–2

== Singles performance timeline ==
Key
W	F	SF	QF	#R	RR	Q#	DNQ	A	NH

(W) winner; (F) finalist; (SF) semifinalist; (QF) quarterfinalist; (#R) rounds 4, 3, 2, 1; (RR) round-robin stage; (Q#) qualification round; (DNQ) did not qualify; (A) absent; (NH) not held; (SR) strike rate (events won / competed); (W–L) win–loss record.

Tournament	1988	1989	1990	1991	1992	1993	1994	1995	1996	1997	1998	1999	2000	2001	2002	SR	W–L
Grand Slam tournaments
Australian Open	A	A	2R	1R	A	4R	A	A	A	3R	1R	A	A	1R	A	0 / 6	6–6
French Open	A	4R	2R	2R	1R	W	W	SF	2R	F	1R	A	1R	2R	A	2 / 12	32–10
Wimbledon	A	1R	2R	A	A	A	4R	A	A	A	A	A	A	1R	A	0 / 4	4–4
US Open	A	1R	2R	2R	2R	1R	4R	2R	3R	4R	2R	A	A	1R	A	0 / 11	13–11
Win–loss	0–0	3–3	4–4	2–3	1–2	10–2	13–2	6–2	3–2	11–3	1–3	0–0	0–1	1–4	0–0	2 / 33	55–31
Year-end championship
ATP Tour World Championships	Did not qualify					RR	SF	Did not qualify		RR^{1}	Did not qualify					0 / 3	2–6
Grand Slam Cup	Not held		Did not qualify			QF	QF	1R	DNQ	1R	DNQ		Not held			0 / 4	2–4
Grand Prix			ATP Masters Series														
Indian Wells Open	A	A	3R	2R	QF	1R	2R	A	A	1R	2R	A	A	A	A	0 / 7	7–7
Miami Open	A	A	2R	4R	3R	A	3R	A	3R	F	2R	A	A	1R	A	0 / 8	10–8
Monte-Carlo Masters	A	A	2R	W	2R	W	F	QF	2R	3R	2R	A	A	1R	A	2 / 10	25–8
Italian Open	A	SF	2R	SF	3R	QF	A	F	1R	3R	1R	A	A	2R	A	0 / 10	18–10
Hamburg Open	A	3R	1R	3R	1R	A	A	SF	QF	QF	3R	A	A	1R	A	0 / 9	11–9
Canadian Open	A	A	A	A	A	A	QF	3R	A	A	A	A	A	A	A	0 / 2	4–2
Cincinnati Open	A	A	A	A	A	A	3R	2R	1R	QF	A	A	A	A	A	0 / 4	4–4
Stockholm/Stuttgart Masters (Note: Held as Stockholm Masters until 1994, and Essen / Stuttgart Masters 1995 onward.)	A	A	1R	2R	A	3R	QF	QF	1R	2R	A	A	A	A	A	0 / 7	5–6
Paris Masters	A	A	SF	3R	2R	2R	SF	3R	1R	3R	A	A	A	A	A	0 / 8	10–8
Win–loss	0–0	0–0	8–7	15–6	7–6	10–4	14–7	16–7	4–7	15–8	4–5	0–0	0–0	1–4	0–0	2 / 63	94–60
Career statistics
Titles	0	0	0	3	3	5	3	0	0	0	0	0	0	0	0	14	
Finals	0	0	2	5	6	9	6	1	1	4	0	0	1	0	0	35	
Hardcourt Win–loss	0–0	0–1	11–8	8–9	5–5	15–9	16–9	11–7	14–9	23–14	4–10	0–0	3–2	0–4	0–0	110–87	
Grass Win–loss	0–0	0–1	1–1	0–0	0–0	0–0	4–2	0–0	0–0	0–0	0–0	0–0	0–0	0–1	0–0	5–5	
Clay Win–loss	0–1	23–11	23–17	38–9	39–10	44–9	35–6	26–8	12–9	20–8	7–15	0–1	14–13	14–15	1–3	296–135	
Carpet Win–loss	0–0	0–0	1–2	5–4	2–7	6–7	11–8	3–4	0–3	6–6	1–2	0–0	0–0	1–1	0–0	36–44	
Overall win–loss	0–1	23–13	36–28	51–22	46–22	65–25	66–25	40–19	26–21	49–28	12–27	0–1	17–15	15–21	1–3	447–271	
Win %	0%	64%	56%	70%	68%	72%	73%	68%	55%	64%	31%	0%	53%	42%	25%	62.26%	
Year-end ranking	333	26	28	11	16	4	4	13	82	8	132	378	85	108	290	$11,632,199	

1. Bruguera withdrew due to a lower back injury at Round Robin Stage after playing the first 2 matches, and was replaced by then World No. 10 Tim Henman.

== Top 10 wins ==
Season	1988	1989	1990	1991	1992	1993	1994	1995	1996	1997	1998	1999	2000	2001	2002	Total
Wins	0	0	2	4	2	6	8	4	1	5	1	0	0	0	0	33

#	Player	Rank	Event	Surface	Rd	Score	BR
1990
1.	(Sweden) Stefan Edberg	2	French Open, Paris, France	Clay	1R	6–4, 6–2, 6–1	46
2.	(Ecuador) Andrés Gómez	6	Paris, France	Carpet (i)	2R	7–6, 4–6, 6–1	39
1991
3.	(Austria) Thomas Muster	9	Stuttgart, Germany	Carpet (i)	1R	6–2, 6–3	28
4.	(Germany) Boris Becker	2	Barcelona, Spain	Clay	3R	6–2, 6–4	21
5.	(Soviet Union) Andrei Chesnokov	9	Barcelona, Spain	Clay	QF	6–2, 7–5	21
6.	(Germany) Boris Becker	2	Monte-Carlo, Monaco	Clay	F	5–7, 6–4, 7–6^{(8–6)}, 7–6^{(7–4)}	15
1992
7.	(Czechoslovakia) Petr Korda	9	Indian Wells, United States	Hard	3R	7–5, 4–6, 6–0	14
8.	(Croatia) Goran Ivanišević	4	Gstaad, Switzerland	Clay	QF	6–3, 6–2	20
1993
9.	(Czech Republic) Petr Korda	6	Milan, Italy	Carpet (i)	SF	6–4, 0–6, 7–5	17
10.	(United States) Andre Agassi	7	Barcelona, Spain	Clay	QF	6–3, 6–1	17
11.	(United States) Ivan Lendl	8	Monte-Carlo, Monaco	Clay	3R	6–1, 6–2	16
12.	(United States) Pete Sampras	1	World Team Cup, Düsseldorf, Germany	Clay	RR	6–3, 6–1	11
13.	(United States) Pete Sampras	1	French Open, Paris, France	Clay	QF	6–3, 4–6, 6–1, 6–4	11
14.	(United States) Jim Courier	2	French Open, Paris, France	Clay	F	6–4, 2–6, 6–2, 3–6, 6–3	11
1994
15.	(Croatia) Goran Ivanišević	5	Monte-Carlo, Monaco	Clay	QF	6–0, 6–3	6
16.	(Sweden) Stefan Edberg	3	Monte-Carlo, Monaco	Clay	SF	6–2, 7–6^{(7–3)}	6
17.	(Sweden) Stefan Edberg	3	World Team Cup, Düsseldorf, Germany	Clay	RR	7–6^{(8–6)}, 5–7, 6–3	6
18.	(Ukraine) Andriy Medvedev	4	French Open, Paris, France	Clay	QF	6–3, 6–2, 7–5	6
19.	(United States) Jim Courier	7	French Open, Paris, France	Clay	SF	6–3, 5–7, 6–3, 6–3	6
20.	(Ukraine) Andriy Medvedev	7	Prague, Czech Republic	Clay	F	6–3, 6–4	3
21.	(United States) Michael Chang	6	ATP Tour World Championships, Frankfurt, Germany	Carpet (i)	RR	7–6^{(7–1)}, 7–5	3
22.	(Spain) Alberto Berasategui	7	ATP Tour World Championships, Frankfurt, Germany	Carpet (i)	RR	6–3, 6–2	3
1995
23.	(United States) Andre Agassi	1	Hamburg, Germany	Clay	QF	6–3, 6–1	12
24.	(Croatia) Goran Ivanišević	4	Rome, Italy	Clay	SF	6–4, 6–4	7
25.	(Russia) Yevgeny Kafelnikov	9	World Team Cup, Düsseldorf, Germany	Clay	RR	6–3, 6–2	7
26.	(Sweden) Magnus Larsson	10	French Open, Paris, France	Clay	4R	6–1, 2–6, 7–5, 7–6^{(7–4)}	7
1996
27.	(Sweden) Thomas Enqvist	9	World Team Cup, Düsseldorf, Germany	Clay	RR	1–6, 6–4, 6–4	23
1997
28.	(Netherlands) Richard Krajicek	7	Milan, Italy	Carpet (i)	1R	4–6, 7–6^{(7–3)}, 7–6^{(15–13)}	47
29.	(United States) Michael Chang	3	Miami, United States	Hard	3R	6–4, 6–3	35
30.	(United States) Pete Sampras	1	Miami, United States	Hard	SF	5–7, 7–6^{(7–2)}, 6–4	35
31.	(South Africa) Wayne Ferreira	10	Hamburg, Germany	Clay	3R	6–1, 6–3	21
32.	(United States) Michael Chang	2	French Open, Paris, France	Clay	4R	3–6, 6–4, 6–3, 6–4	19
1998
33.	(Spain) Àlex Corretja	7	Majorca, Spain	Clay	2R	7–6^{(7–5)}, 6–3	126

== Open era records ==
Time span	Other selected records	Players matched
1993	Grand Slam Triple bagel win (6–0, 6–0, 6–0)	Nikola Špear; Karel Nováček; Stefan Edberg; Ivan Lendl

== Notes ==
Preceded by (Chile) Marcelo Ríos	ATP Champions Tour; Year-End No.1; 2007	Succeeded by (Croatia) Goran Ivanišević
