= Anastasios Bavelas =

Greek tennis player

Anastasios "Tasos" Bavelas
- Native name: Αναστάσιος Μπαβέλας
- Country (sports): Greece
- Born: 27 February 1968 (age 58) Athens, Greece

Singles
- Highest ranking: No. 451

Doubles
- Highest ranking: No. 438

Anastasios ("Tasos") Bavelas (Greek: Αναστάσιος ("Τάσος") Μπαβέλας; born 27 February 1968 in Athens, Attica) is a retired tennis player from Greece and current coach.

Bavelas represented his native country in the doubles competition at the 1988 Summer Olympics in Seoul, partnering George Kalovelonis. The pair was eliminated in the first round there. He also competed at the 1984 Summer Olympics and the 1992 Summer Olympics.

The left-hander Bavelas represented Greece in the Davis Cup from 1984 to 1994, posting a 15–13 record in singles and a 5–3 record in doubles.

Bevalas played in some dozen minor circuit events during the 1980s. He highest ranking in singles was world No. 451, which he reached in November 1984. His highest doubles ranking was World No. 438, which he reached in July 1986.

As of 2018, Bavelas was the tennis coach for the Greek Women's National Team.
