= ATP Athens Open =

Defunct tennis tournament
- Event name: Athens Open (1986–91); Saab International (1992); Athens International (1993–94)
- Tour: Grand Prix circuit (1986–89); ATP Tour (1990–94)
- Founded: 1986
- Abolished: 1994
- Editions: 9
- Location: Athens, Greece
- Venue: Athens Lawn Tennis Club
- Surface: Clay (1986–1994)

The ATP Athens Open is a defunct Grand Prix and ATP Tour affiliated tennis tournament held annually in Athens in Greece from 1986 to 1994, played on outdoor clay courts at Athens Lawn Tennis Club. In 2008 the tournament was renewed under the new name of the Status Athens Open on the ATP Challenger Series, awarding $75,000 in prize money. The historical precursor event to this one was the Athens International Championships founded as the Greek International Championships in 1931, that ran as a combined men's and women's event until 1973. The men's tournament was revived one more time in 1981 then it was discontinued. It was also played at the Athens Lawn Tennis Club.

== Finals ==
=== Singles ===
Year	Champions	Runners-up	Score
1986	(Sweden) Henrik Sundström	(Mexico) Francisco Maciel	6–0, 7–5
1987	(Argentina) Guillermo Pérez Roldán	(West Germany) Tore Meinecke	6–2, 6–3
1988	(Austria) Horst Skoff	(Socialist Federal Republic of Yugoslavia) Bruno Orešar	6–3, 2–6, 6–2
1989	(Haiti) Ronald Agénor	(Sweden) Kent Carlsson	6–3, 6–4
1990	(Netherlands) Mark Koevermans	(Argentina) Franco Davín	5–7, 6–4, 6–1
1991	(Spain) Sergi Bruguera	(Spain) Jordi Arrese	7–5, 6–3
1992	(Spain) Jordi Arrese	(Spain) Sergi Bruguera	7–5, 3–0 (ret.)
1993	(Spain) Jordi Arrese	(Spain) Alberto Berasategui	6–4, 3–6, 6–3
1994	(Spain) Alberto Berasategui	(Spain) Óscar Martinez	4–6, 7–6, 6–3

=== Doubles ===
Year	Champions	Runners-up	Score
1986	(Belgium) Libor Pimek (United States) Blaine Willenborg	(Peru) Carlos di Laura (Italy) Claudio Panatta	5–7, 6–4, 6–2
1987	(West Germany) Tore Meinecke (West Germany) Ricki Osterthun	(Czechoslovakia) Jaroslav Navrátil (Netherlands) Tom Nijssen	6–2, 3–6, 6–2
1988	(Sweden) Rikard Bergh (Sweden) Per Henricsson	(Peru) Pablo Arraya (Czechoslovakia) Karel Nováček	6–4, 7–5
1989	(Italy) Claudio Panatta (Czechoslovakia) Tomáš Šmíd	(Argentina) Gustavo Giussani (Argentina) Gerardo Mirad	6–3, 6–2
1990	(Spain) Sergio Casal (Spain) Javier Sánchez	(Netherlands) Tom Kempers (Netherlands) Richard Krajicek	4–6, 7–6, 6–3
1991	(Netherlands) Jacco Eltingh (Netherlands) Mark Koevermans	(Netherlands) Menno Oosting (Finland) Olli Rahnasto	5–7, 7–6, 7–5
1992	(Spain) Tomás Carbonell (Spain) Francisco Roig	(Uruguay) Marcelo Filippini (Netherlands) Mark Koevermans	6–3, 6–4
1993	(Argentina) Horacio de la Peña (Mexico) Jorge Lozano	(South Africa) Royce Deppe (United States) John Sullivan	3–6, 6–1, 6–2
1994	(Argentina) Luis Lobo (Spain) Javier Sánchez	(Italy) Cristian Brandi (Italy) Federico Mordegan	5–7, 6–1, 6–4

== See also ==
- Athens Trophy – women's tournament
- Greek International Championships
