= Jordi Arrese =

Spanish tennis player (born 1964)

- Country (sports): Spain
- Residence: Barcelona, Spain
- Born: 29 August 1964 (age 62) Barcelona
- Height: 1.75 m (5 ft 9 in)
- Turned pro: 1982
- Retired: 1998
- Plays: Right-handed (one-handed backhand)
- Prize money: $1,847,136

Singles
- Career record: 224–210
- Career titles: 6
- Highest ranking: No. 23 (4 November 1991)

Grand Slam singles results
- Australian Open: 2R (1990)
- French Open: 3R (1985, 1987, 1990, 1993)
- Wimbledon: 1R (1991)
- US Open: 1R (1990, 1992)

Other tournaments
- Olympic Games: F (1992)

Doubles
- Career record: 83–112
- Career titles: 4
- Highest ranking: No. 62 (14 August 1995)

Grand Slam doubles results
- Australian Open: 1R (1990)
- French Open: 2R (1987, 1995, 1996)
Medal record
Olympic Games
Silver medal – second place	1992 Barcelona	Singles

Jordi Arrese i Castañé (Catalan pronunciation: [ˈʒɔɾði əˈrezəj kəstəˈɲe]; born 29 August 1964) is a former professional tennis player from Spain.

Born in Barcelona, Arrese won the men's singles silver medal at the 1992 Olympic Games in his home town. In the final, he was defeated in a marathon five-set match by Marc Rosset of Switzerland, 7–6, 6–4, 3–6, 4–6, 8–6.

During his career, Arrese won six top-level singles and four tour doubles titles, and reached a career-high singles ranking of world No. 23.

== Career finals ==
=== Singles: 12 (6 wins, 6 losses) ===
Winner - Legend
Grand Slam (0–0)
Olympic Games (0–1)
ATP Masters Series (0–0)
ATP Championship Series (0–0)
ATP Tour (6–5)

Result	W–L	Date	Tournament	Surface	Opponent	Score
Loss	0–1	Sep 1989	Madrid, Spain	Clay	(Argentina) Martín Jaite	3–6, 2–6
Win	1–1	Aug 1990	San Remo, Italy	Clay	(Spain) Juan Aguilera	6–2, 6–2
Win	2–1	Aug 1990	Prague, Czechoslovakia	Clay	(Sweden) Nicklas Kulti	7–6^{(7–3)}, 7–6^{(8–6)}
Win	3–1	May 1991	Madrid, Spain	Clay	(Uruguay) Marcelo Filippini	6–2, 6–4
Loss	3–2	Jun 1991	Genova, Italy	Clay	(Germany) Carl-Uwe Steeb	3–6, 4–6
Loss	3–3	Jul 1991	Hilversum, Netherlands	Clay	(Sweden) Magnus Gustafsson	7–5, 6–7^{(2–7)}, 6–2, 1–6, 0–6
Loss	3–4	Oct 1991	Athens, Greece	Clay	(Spain) Sergi Bruguera	5–7, 3–6
Win	4–4	Nov 1991	Buzios, Brazil	Clay	(Brazil) Jaime Oncins	1–6, 6–4, 6–0
Loss	4–5	Jul 1992	Hilversum, Netherlands	Clay	(Czechoslovakia) Karel Nováček	2–6, 3–6, 6–2, 5–7
Loss	4–6	Aug 1992	Olympic Games, Barcelona	Clay	(Switzerland) Marc Rosset	6–7^{(2–7)}, 4–6, 6–3, 6–4, 6–8
Win	5–6	Oct 1992	Athens, Greece	Clay	(Spain) Sergi Bruguera	7–5, 3–0 ret.
Win	6–6	Oct 1993	Athens, Greece	Clay	(Spain) Alberto Berasategui	6–4, 3–6, 6–3

=== Doubles: 10 (4 wins, 6 losses) ===
Result	W–L	Date	Tournament	Surface	Partner	Opponents	Score
Loss	0–1	Jun 1985	Bologna, Italy	Clay	(Spain) Alberto Tous	(Italy) Paolo Canè (Italy) Simone Colombo	5–7, 4–6
Win	1–1	Jul 1986	Bordeaux, France	Clay	(Spain) David De Miguel	(Haiti) Ronald Agénor (Iran) Mansour Bahrami	7–5, 6–4
Win	2–1	Aug 1989	Prague, Czechoslovakia	Clay	(Austria) Horst Skoff	(Czechoslovakia) Petr Korda (Czechoslovakia) Tomáš Šmíd	6–4, 6–4
Win	3–1	Aug 1991	San Marino	Clay	(Spain) Carlos Costa	(Argentina) Christian Miniussi (Uruguay) Diego Pérez	6–3, 3–6, 6–3
Loss	2–3	Aug 1993	Umag, Croatia	Clay	(Spain) Francisco Roig	(Belgium) Filip Dewulf (Belgium) Tom Vanhoudt	4–6, 5–7
Loss	3–3	Aug 1994	San Marino	Clay	(Italy) Renzo Furlan	(United Kingdom) Neil Broad (United States) Greg Van Emburgh	4–6, 6–7
Loss	3–4	Sep 1994	Bucharest, Romania	Clay	(Spain) José Antonio Conde	(Australia) Wayne Arthurs (Australia) Simon Youl	4–6, 4–6
Loss	3–5	Jun 1995	Oporto, Portugal	Clay	(Spain) Àlex Corretja	(Spain) Tomás Carbonell (Spain) Francisco Roig	3–6, 6–7
Loss	3–6	Aug 1995	Kitzbühel, Austria	Clay	(Australia) Wayne Arthurs	(United States) Francisco Montana (United States) Greg Van Emburgh	7–6, 3–6, 6–7
Win	4–6	Aug 1995	San Marino	Clay	(Australia) Andrew Kratzmann	(Argentina) Pablo Albano (Italy) Federico Mordegan	7–6, 3–6, 6–2
