= Mark Koevermans =

Dutch tennis player

- Country (sports): Netherlands
- Residence: Rotterdam, Netherlands
- Born: 3 February 1968 (age 57); Rotterdam, Netherlands
- Height: 1.85 m (6 ft 1 in)
- Turned pro: 1987
- Retired: 1994
- Plays: Right-handed
- Prize money: $842,859

Singles
- Career record: 72–84
- Career titles: 1
- Highest ranking: No. 37 (27 May 1991)

Grand Slam singles results
- Australian Open: 3R (1991)
- French Open: 2R (1990)
- Wimbledon: 4R (1990)
- US Open: 2R (1989)

Doubles
- Career record: 113–91
- Career titles: 4
- Highest ranking: No. 24 (21 June 1993)

Grand Slam doubles results
- Australian Open: 3R (1991)
- French Open: SF (1990)
- Wimbledon: QF (1992)
- US Open: 2R (1991)

Mark Koevermans (Dutch pronunciation: [mɑr(k) ˈkuvərmɑns]; born 3 February 1968) is a former tennis player from the Netherlands, who turned professional in 1987. He represented his native country as a lucky loser at the 1992 Summer Olympics in Barcelona, where he was defeated in the third round by Brazil's Jaime Oncins. Going by the nickname Koef, a right-hander, won one career title in singles (Athens, 1990). He reached his highest singles ATP-ranking on 27 May 1991, when he was ranked number 37.

In April 2009, Koevermans was appointed as commercial director at Dutch football club Feyenoord.

== Career finals ==
=== Doubles: 16 (4 wins, 12 losses) ===
Legend (doubles)
Grand Slam tournaments (0)
Tennis Masters Cup (0)
ATP Masters Series (1)
ATP International Series Gold (0)
ATP International Series (3)

Result	W/L	Date	Tournament	Surface	Partner	Opponents	Score
Loss	1.	1990	Casablanca, Morocco	Clay	(Netherlands) Paul Haarhuis	(Australia) Todd Woodbridge (Australia) Simon Youl	3–6, 1–6
Loss	2.	1990	Hilversum, Netherlands	Clay	(Netherlands) Paul Haarhuis	(Spain) Sergio Casal (Spain) Emilio Sánchez	5–7, 5–7
Loss	3.	1990	São Paulo, Brazil	Carpet	(Brazil) Luiz Mattar	(United States) Shelby Cannon (Venezuela) Alfonso Mora	7–6, 3–6, 6–7
Loss	4.	1991	Adelaide, Australia	Hard	(Netherlands) Paul Haarhuis	(South Africa) Wayne Ferreira (South Africa) Stefan Kruger	4–6, 6–4, 4–6
Win	1.	1991	Estoril, Portugal	Clay	(Netherlands) Paul Haarhuis	(Netherlands) Tom Nijssen (Czech Republic) Cyril Suk	6–3, 6–3
Loss	5.	1991	Monte Carlo, Monaco	Clay	(Netherlands) Paul Haarhuis	(United States) Luke Jensen (Australia) Laurie Warder	7–5, 6–7, 4–6
Win	2.	1991	Athens, Greece	Clay	(Netherlands) Jacco Eltingh	(Netherlands) Menno Oosting (Finland) Olli Rahnasto	5–7, 7–6, 7–5
Loss	6.	1992	Rotterdam, Netherlands	Carpet	(Netherlands) Paul Haarhuis	(Germany) Marc-Kevin Goellner (Germany) David Prinosil	2–6, 7–6, 6–7
Loss	7.	1992	Genova, Italy	Clay	(Netherlands) Paul Haarhuis	(United States) Shelby Cannon (United States) Greg Van Emburgh	1–6, 1–6
Win	3.	1992	Hilversum, Netherlands	Clay	(Netherlands) Paul Haarhuis	(Sweden) Marten Renström (Sweden) Mikael Tillström	6–7, 6–1, 6–4
Loss	8.	1992	Athens, Greece	Clay	(Uruguay) Marcelo Filippini	(Spain) Tomás Carbonell (Spain) Francisco Roig	3–6, 4–6
Loss	9.	1992	Tel Aviv, Israel	Hard	(Sweden) Tobias Svantesson	(United States) Mike Bauer (Portugal) João Cunha e Silva	3–6, 4–6
Loss	10.	1993	Monte Carlo, Monaco	Clay	(Netherlands) Paul Haarhuis	(Sweden) Stefan Edberg (Czech Republic) Petr Korda	6–3, 2–6, 6–7
Win	4.	1993	Hamburg, Germany	Clay	(Netherlands) Paul Haarhuis	(Canada) Grant Connell (United States) Patrick Galbraith	6–4, 6–7, 7–6
Loss	11.	1993	Florence, Italy	Clay	(United States) Greg Van Emburgh	(Spain) Tomás Carbonell (Belgium) Libor Pimek	6–7, 6–2, 1–6
Loss	12.	1993	Genova, Italy	Clay	(United States) Greg Van Emburgh	(Spain) Sergio Casal (Spain) Emilio Sánchez	3–6, 6–7

=== Singles (1 win) ===
Result	W/L	Date	Tournament	Surface	Opponent	Score
Win	1–0	Oct 1990	Athens, Greece	Clay	(Argentina) Franco Davín	5–7, 6–4, 6–1
