= 1989 Grand Prix Villa de Madrid – Doubles =

Doubles
- 1989 Grand Prix Villa de Madrid

Final
- Champions: (Spain) Tomás Carbonell (Spain) Carlos Costa
- Runners-up: (Spain) Francisco Clavet (Czechoslovakia) Tomáš Šmíd
- Score: 7–5, 6–3

Details
- Draw: 16
- Seeds: 4

Events
Singles	Doubles
← 1988 ·	Madrid Tennis Grand Prix	· 1990 →

Sergio Casal and Emilio Sánchez were the defending champions, but Casal chose to focus only on the singles tournament, reaching the semifinals. Emilio Sánchez teamed up with his brother Javier Sánchez and lost in the semifinals to Francisco Clavet and Tomáš Šmíd.

Tomás Carbonell and Carlos Costa won the title by defeating Clavet and Šmíd 7–5, 6–3 in the final.

== Seeds ==
1. (Spain) Emilio Sánchez / (Spain) Javier Sánchez (semifinals)
2. (Spain) Tomás Carbonell / (Spain) Carlos Costa (champions)
3. (Peru) Carlos di Laura / (Mexico) Agustín Moreno (first round)
4. (Spain) Francisco Clavet / (Czechoslovakia) Tomáš Šmíd (final)

== Draw ==
=== Key ===
- Q = Qualifier
- WC = Wild card
- LL = Lucky loser
- Alt = Alternate
- ITF = ITF entry
- PR = Protected ranking
- SR = Special ranking
- SE = Special exempt
- JE = Junior exempt
- JR = Junior Accelerator Programme entrant
- CO = College Accelerator Programme entrant
- NG = Next Gen Accelerator Program entrant
- w/o = Walkover
- r = Retired
- d = Defaulted

=== Draw ===
First round
1	(Spain) E Sánchez (Spain) J Sánchez	6	6
(Spain) G López (Spain) Eduardo Mandarino	3	4
(Brazil) L Mattar (Puerto Rico) M Nido	6	6
(Chile) C Araya (Ecuador) R Viver	1	2
4	(Spain) F Clavet (Czechoslovakia) T Šmíd	6	6
(Argentina) G Giussani (Argentina) C Miniussi	1	2
(Spain) JF Altur (Spain) JL Aparisi	6	7
(Spain) J Arrese (Argentina) M Jaite	2	6
(Spain) M Górriz (Spain) V Solves	0	3
(Japan) E Furusho (United States) J Sobel	6	6
(Sweden) D Engel (Sweden) F Nilsson	6	3	6
3	(Peru) C di Laura (Mexico) A Moreno	4	6	3
(Spain) JC Báguena (Spain) B Uribe	7	6
(Italy) C Caratti (Italy) F Mordegan	6	2
(Spain) J Colás (Spain) F Roig	6	1	1
2	(Spain) T Carbonell (Spain) C Costa	3	6	6

Quarterfinals
1	(Spain) E Sánchez (Spain) J Sánchez	3	6	6
(Brazil) L Mattar (Puerto Rico) M Nido	6	4	1
4	(Spain) F Clavet (Czechoslovakia) T Šmíd	6	6
(Spain) JF Altur (Spain) JL Aparisi	3	4
(Japan) E Furusho (United States) J Sobel	4	6	7
(Sweden) D Engel (Sweden) F Nilsson	6	2	6
(Spain) JC Báguena (Spain) B Uribe	6	6
2	(Spain) T Carbonell (Spain) C Costa	7	7

Semifinals
1	(Spain) E Sánchez (Spain) J Sánchez	7	4	6
4	(Spain) F Clavet (Czechoslovakia) T Šmíd	6	6	7
(Japan) E Furusho (United States) J Sobel	3	2
2	(Spain) T Carbonell (Spain) C Costa	6	6

Final
4	(Spain) F Clavet (Czechoslovakia) T Šmíd	5	3
2	(Spain) T Carbonell (Spain) C Costa	7	6
