= 1989 Grand Prix Villa de Madrid – Singles =

Singles
- 1989 Grand Prix Villa de Madrid

Final
- Champion: (Argentina) Martín Jaite
- Runner-up: (Spain) Jordi Arrese
- Score: 6–3, 6–2

Details
- Draw: 32 (3WC/4Q)
- Seeds: 8

Events
Singles	Doubles
← 1988 ·	Madrid Tennis Grand Prix	· 1990 →

Kent Carlsson was the defending champion but did not compete this year, having played his last professional tournament at Kitzbühel in early August.

Martín Jaite won the title by defeating Jordi Arrese 6–3, 6–2 in the final.

== Seeds ==
1. (Spain) Emilio Sánchez (second round)
2. (Argentina) Martín Jaite (champion)
3. (Austria) Horst Skoff (quarterfinals, retired)
4. (Spain) Jordi Arrese (final)
5. (Spain) Javier Sánchez (semifinals)
6. (Brazil) Luiz Mattar (quarterfinals)
7. (Spain) Tomás Carbonell (quarterfinals)
8. (Uruguay) Diego Pérez (quarterfinals)

== Draw ==
=== Key ===
- Q = Qualifier
- WC = Wild card
- LL = Lucky loser
- Alt = Alternate
- ITF = ITF entry
- PR = Protected ranking
- SR = Special ranking
- SE = Special exempt
- JE = Junior exempt
- JR = Junior Accelerator Programme entrant
- CO = College Accelerator Programme entrant
- NG = Next Gen Accelerator Program entrant
- w/o = Walkover
- r = Retired
- d = Defaulted

=== Finals ===
Semifinals
(Spain) Sergio Casal	5	6
4	(Spain) Jordi Arrese	7	7
5	(Spain) Javier Sánchez	4	4
2	(Argentina) Martín Jaite	6	6

Final
4	(Spain) Jordi Arrese	3	2
2	(Argentina) Martín Jaite	6	6

=== Top half ===
First round
1	(Spain) E Sánchez	6	3	6
(Puerto Rico) M Nido	3	6	3
(Italy) P Pambianco	7	5	0^{r}
(Spain) S Casal	5	7	3
Q	(Italy) F Mordegan	7	4	6
Q	(Spain) J Clavet	6	6	7
(Argentina) G Markus	1	0^{r}
7	(Spain) T Carbonell	6	4
4	(Spain) J Arrese	6	4	6
(Argentina) C Miniussi	3	6	1
WC	(Spain) G López	6	1	6
(Spain) C Costa	3	6	4
WC	(Spain) Eduardo Mandarino	0	4
(Italy) R Furlan	6	6
(Peru) A Aramburú	0	3
6	(Brazil) L Mattar	6	6

Second round
1	(Spain) E Sánchez	7	5	3
(Spain) S Casal	5	7	6
Q	(Spain) J Clavet	2	3
7	(Spain) T Carbonell	6	6
4	(Spain) J Arrese	6	6
WC	(Spain) G López	3	2
(Italy) R Furlan	2	4
6	(Brazil) L Mattar	6	6

Quarterfinals
(Spain) S Casal	2	7	6
7	(Spain) T Carbonell	6	5	3
4	(Spain) J Arrese	6	4	6
6	(Brazil) L Mattar	4	6	1

Semifinals
(Spain) S Casal	5	6
4	(Spain) J Arrese	7	7

=== Bottom half ===
First round
5	(Spain) J Sánchez	6	6
(Spain) JL Aparisi	4	4
Q	(Spain) M Górriz	5	6	6
(Spain) F Roig	7	1	3
(Czechoslovakia) T Šmíd	6	6
(Sweden) T Haldin	4	4
WC	(Spain) J López-Maeso	3	0
3	(Austria) H Skoff	6	6
8	(Uruguay) D Pérez	6	7
(Argentina) R Azar	2	6
Q	(Mexico) A Moreno	7	6
(Ecuador) R Viver	5	3
(Argentina) G Giussani	3	2
(Spain) JC Báguena	6	6
(Sweden) D Engel	3	4
2	(Argentina) M Jaite	6	6

Second round
5	(Spain) J Sánchez	6	6
Q	(Spain) M Górriz	3	3
(Czechoslovakia) T Šmíd	4	1
3	(Austria) H Skoff	6	6
8	(Uruguay) D Pérez	6	6
Q	(Mexico) A Moreno	1	3
(Spain) JC Báguena	4	4
2	(Argentina) M Jaite	6	6

Quarterfinals
5	(Spain) J Sánchez	6	2
3	(Austria) H Skoff	3	1^{r}
8	(Uruguay) D Pérez	6	3
2	(Argentina) M Jaite	7	6

Semifinals
5	(Spain) J Sánchez	4	4
2	(Argentina) M Jaite	6	6
