= 1991 Trofeo Villa de Madrid – Doubles =

Doubles
- 1991 Trofeo Villa de Madrid

Final
- Champions: (Argentina) Gustavo Luza (Brazil) Cássio Motta
- Runners-up: (Brazil) Luiz Mattar (Brazil) Jaime Oncins
- Score: 6–0, 7–5

Details
- Draw: 16 (1WC/1Q)
- Seeds: 4

Events
Singles	Doubles
← 1990 ·	Madrid Tennis Grand Prix	· 1992 →

Juan Carlos Báguena and Omar Camporese were the defending champions, but Camporese did not compete this year. Báguena teamed up with Francisco Roig and lost in the first round to Gustavo Luza and Cássio Motta.

Luza and Motta won the title by defeating Luiz Mattar and Jaime Oncins 6–0, 7–5 in the final.

== Seeds ==
1. (Spain) Sergio Casal / (Spain) Emilio Sánchez (semifinals)
2. (Ecuador) Andrés Gómez / (Spain) Javier Sánchez (quarterfinals)
3. (Iran) Mansour Bahrami / (Netherlands) Michiel Schapers (first round)
4. (Spain) Sergi Bruguera / (Spain) Tomás Carbonell (semifinals)

== Draw ==
Key

- Q = Qualifier
- WC = Wild card
- LL = Lucky loser
- Alt = Alternate
- ITF = ITF entry
- PR = Protected ranking
- SR = Special ranking
- SE = Special exempt
- JE = Junior exempt
- JR = Junior Accelerator Programme entrant
- CO = College Accelerator Programme entrant
- NG = Next Gen Accelerator Program entrant
- w/o = Walkover
- r = Retired
- d = Defaulted

=== Draw ===
First round
1	(Spain) S Casal (Spain) E Sánchez	6	6
(Czechoslovakia) K Nováček (Czechoslovakia) L Pimek	2	1
(Mexico) L Lavalle (Mexico) J Lozano	7	6
(United States) J Brown (Netherlands) HJ Davids	6	3
3	(Iran) M Bahrami (Netherlands) M Schapers	4	2
(United States) B Garnett (United States) G Van Emburgh	6	6
(Argentina) G Luza (Brazil) C Motta	6	6
(Spain) JC Báguena (Spain) F Roig	3	4
(Spain) JL Aparisi (Spain) M Górriz	6	6	5
WC	(Spain) F Clavet (United States) J Connors	3	7	7
Q	(Spain) J Clavet (Spain) D de Miguel	6	3	2
4	(Spain) S Bruguera (Spain) T Carbonell	2	6	6
(Spain) C Costa (Argentina) C Miniussi	4	4
(Brazil) L Mattar (Brazil) J Oncins	6	6
(Sweden) R Båthman (Sweden) R Bergh	1	3
2	(Ecuador) A Gómez (Spain) J Sánchez	6	6

Quarterfinals
1	(Spain) S Casal (Spain) E Sánchez	6	6
(Mexico) L Lavalle (Mexico) J Lozano	3	1
(United States) B Garnett (United States) G Van Emburgh	1	2
(Argentina) G Luza (Brazil) C Motta	6	6
WC	(Spain) F Clavet (United States) J Connors	5	4
4	(Spain) S Bruguera (Spain) T Carbonell	7	6
(Brazil) L Mattar (Brazil) J Oncins	6	6
2	(Ecuador) A Gómez (Spain) J Sánchez	4	4

Semifinals
1	(Spain) S Casal (Spain) E Sánchez	4	4
(Argentina) G Luza (Brazil) C Motta	6	6
4	(Spain) S Bruguera (Spain) T Carbonell	2	2
(Brazil) L Mattar (Brazil) J Oncins	6	6

Final
(Argentina) G Luza (Brazil) C Motta	6	7
(Brazil) L Mattar (Brazil) J Oncins	0	5
