= 1991 Trofeo Villa de Madrid – Singles =

Singles
- 1991 Trofeo Villa de Madrid

Final
- Champion: (Spain) Jordi Arrese
- Runner-up: (Uruguay) Marcelo Filippini
- Score: 6–2, 6–4

Details
- Draw: 32 (3WC/4Q)
- Seeds: 8

Events
Singles	Doubles
← 1990 ·	Madrid Tennis Grand Prix	· 1992 →

Andrés Gómez was the defending champion, but was forced to retire during his second round match against Jacco Eltingh.

Jordi Arrese won the title by defeating Marcelo Filippini 6–2, 6–4 in the final.

== Seeds ==
1. (Spain) Emilio Sánchez (first round)
2. (Spain) Sergi Bruguera (second round)
3. (Ecuador) Andrés Gómez (second round, retired)
4. (Czechoslovakia) Karel Nováček (semifinals)
5. (Uruguay) Marcelo Filippini (final)
6. (Argentina) Franco Davín (quarterfinals)
7. (Spain) Jordi Arrese (champion)
8. (Brazil) Luiz Mattar (first round)

== Draw ==
Key

- Q = Qualifier
- WC = Wild card
- LL = Lucky loser
- Alt = Alternate
- ITF = ITF entry
- PR = Protected ranking
- SR = Special ranking
- SE = Special exempt
- JE = Junior exempt
- JR = Junior Accelerator Programme entrant
- CO = College Accelerator Programme entrant
- NG = Next Gen Accelerator Program entrant
- w/o = Walkover
- r = Retired
- d = Defaulted

=== Finals ===
Semifinals
7	(Spain) Jordi Arrese	6	6
4	(Czech Republic) Karel Nováček	4	3
5	(Uruguay) Marcelo Filippini	7	6
(Spain) Javier Sánchez	5	1

Final
7	(Spain) Jordi Arrese	6	6
5	(Uruguay) Marcelo Filippini	2	4

=== Top half ===
First round
1	(Spain) E Sánchez	6	6^{4}	3
(Italy) R Furlan	4	7^{7}	6
(Belgium) E Masso	0	6	3
(France) T Champion	6	3	6
Q	(Spain) JF Altur	6	6
WC	(Spain) JA Rodríguez	4	1
Q	(Spain) JA Conde	3	2
7	(Spain) J Arrese	6	6
4	(Czech Republic) K Nováček	6	7^{7}
(Italy) D Nargiso	3	6^{1}
Q	(Brazil) C Motta	7^{8}	1	6
WC	(United States) J Connors	6^{6}	6	1
(Sweden) M Wilander	6	6
Q	(Netherlands) HJ Davids	2	4
(Sweden) J Gunnarsson	1	4
6	(Argentina) F Davín	6	6

Second round
(Italy) R Furlan	6	1	1
(France) T Champion	3	6	6
Q	(Spain) JF Altur	4	7^{8}	6^{2}
7	(Spain) J Arrese	6	6^{6}	7^{7}
4	(Czech Republic) K Nováček	6	7
Q	(Brazil) C Motta	3	5
(Sweden) M Wilander	3	6	0
6	(Argentina) F Davín	6	2	6

Quarterfinals
(France) T Champion	4	2^{r}
7	(Spain) J Arrese	6	3
4	(Czech Republic) K Nováček	6	3	6
6	(Argentina) F Davín	3	6	1

Semifinals
7	(Spain) J Arrese	6	6
4	(Czech Republic) K Nováček	4	3

=== Bottom half ===
First round
5	(Uruguay) M Filippini	6	6
(Spain) F Clavet	0	4
(Brazil) J Oncins	6	6
(Germany) P Baur	3	1
(Czech Republic) M Šrejber	3	6^{3}
(Netherlands) J Eltingh	6	7^{7}
(Czech Republic) S Doseděl	0	2
3	(Ecuador) A Gómez	6	6
8	(Brazil) L Mattar	4	4
(Germany) M Sinner	6	6
(Argentina) R Azar	6^{1}	7^{7}	6^{5}
WC	(Spain) G López	7^{7}	6^{1}	7^{7}
(France) T Benhabiles	6^{4}	4
(Spain) J Sánchez	7^{7}	6
(Spain) T Carbonell	4	0
2	(Spain) S Bruguera	6	6

Second round
5	(Uruguay) M Filippini	6	3	7^{7}
(Brazil) J Oncins	2	6	6^{1}
(Netherlands) J Eltingh	6	5	3
3	(Ecuador) A Gómez	3	7	1^{r}
(Germany) M Sinner	4	4
WC	(Spain) G López	6	6
(Spain) J Sánchez	3	6	6
2	(Spain) S Bruguera	6	1	4

Quarterfinals
5	(Uruguay) M Filippini	6	6
(Netherlands) J Eltingh	4	2
WC	(Spain) G López	6^{5}	4
(Spain) J Sánchez	7^{7}	6

Semifinals
5	(Uruguay) M Filippini	7	6
(Spain) J Sánchez	5	1
