= 1992 Trofeo Villa de Madrid – Singles =

Singles
- 1992 Trofeo Villa de Madrid

Final
- Champion: (Spain) Sergi Bruguera
- Runner-up: (Spain) Carlos Costa
- Score: 7–6^{(8–6)}, 6–2, 6–2

Details
- Draw: 32 (2WC/4Q/1LL)
- Seeds: 8

Events
Singles	Doubles
← 1991 ·	Madrid Tennis Grand Prix	· 1993 →

Jordi Arrese was the defending champion, but lost in the quarterfinals to Javier Sánchez.

Sergi Bruguera won the title by defeating Carlos Costa 7–6^{(8–6)}, 6–2, 6–2 in the final.

== Seeds ==
1. (n/a)
2. (Czechoslovakia) Ivan Lendl (first round)
3. (Argentina) Alberto Mancini (quarterfinals)
4. (Spain) Emilio Sánchez (first round)
5. (Spain) Sergi Bruguera (champion)
6. (Spain) Francisco Clavet (semifinals)
7. (Spain) Carlos Costa (final)
8. (Spain) Jordi Arrese (quarterfinals)

== Draw ==
=== Key ===
- Q = Qualifier
- WC = Wild card
- LL = Lucky loser
- Alt = Alternate
- ITF = ITF entry
- PR = Protected ranking
- SR = Special ranking
- SE = Special exempt
- JE = Junior exempt
- JR = Junior Accelerator Programme entrant
- CO = College Accelerator Programme entrant
- NG = Next Gen Accelerator Program entrant
- w/o = Walkover
- r = Retired
- d = Defaulted

=== Finals ===
Semifinals
7	(Spain) Carlos Costa	7	6
6/WC	(Spain) Francisco Clavet	5	4
5	(Spain) Sergi Bruguera	6	6
(Spain) Javier Sánchez	4	2

Final
7	(Spain) Carlos Costa	6^{6}	2	2
5	(Spain) Sergi Bruguera	7^{8}	6	6

=== Top half ===
First round
LL	(Spain) A Berasategui	3	4
(Argentina) M Jaite	6	6
(Argentina) C Miniussi	7^{7}	2	3
(France) A Boetsch	6^{5}	6	6
(Spain) G López	7	6
Q	(Netherlands) HJ Davids	5	4
Q	(Spain) JA Viloca	6^{3}	6^{7}
7	(Spain) C Costa	7^{7}	7^{9}
3	(Argentina) A Mancini	6	7
(Argentina) J Frana	4	5
Q	(Spain) D de Miguel	5	3
(France) F Santoro	7	6
WC	(Spain) Marcos Pérez-Hubert	7^{7}	4	3
(United States) J McEnroe	6^{2}	6	6
(Brazil) J Oncins	3	4
6/WC	(Spain) F Clavet	6	6

Second round
(Argentina) M Jaite	4	2
(France) A Boetsch	6	6
(Spain) G López	2	0
7	(Spain) C Costa	6	6
3	(Argentina) A Mancini	6	7
(France) F Santoro	0	5
(United States) J McEnroe	2	1
6/WC	(Spain) F Clavet	6	6

Quarterfinals
(France) A Boetsch	4	1
7	(Spain) C Costa	6	6
3	(Argentina) A Mancini	5	1
6/WC	(Spain) F Clavet	7	6

Semifinals
7	(Spain) C Costa	7	6
6/WC	(Spain) F Clavet	5	4

=== Bottom half ===
First round
5	(Spain) S Bruguera	6	3	6
(Italy) R Furlan	1	6	3
(France) F Fontang	1	6	6
(Italy) D Nargiso	6	2	3
(Ecuador) A Gómez	6	6
(Spain) T Carbonell	2	0
(Switzerland) M Rosset	6	3	6
4	(Spain) E Sánchez	0	6	3
8	(Spain) J Arrese	6	6
WC	(Spain) J Gisbert Schultze	0	2
(France) T Champion	7^{7}	6
Q	(Spain) JA Conde	6^{4}	0
(Spain) J Sánchez	6	6
(United States) P McEnroe	4	0
(Argentina) G Markus	1	7	7^{7}
2	(Czechoslovakia) I Lendl	6	5	6^{3}

Second round
5	(Spain) S Bruguera	1	6	6
(France) F Fontang	6	1	4
(Ecuador) A Gómez	6^{6}	6	6^{4}
(Switzerland) M Rosset	7^{8}	3	7^{7}
8	(Spain) J Arrese	6	4	6
(France) T Champion	2	6	1
(Spain) J Sánchez	2	6	6
(Argentina) G Markus	6	3	2

Quarterfinals
5	(Spain) S Bruguera	6	7^{7}
(Switzerland) M Rosset	3	6^{3}
8	(Spain) J Arrese	3	4
(Spain) J Sánchez	6	6

Semifinals
5	(Spain) S Bruguera	6	6
(Spain) J Sánchez	4	2
