= 1993 Swedish Open – Singles =

Singles
- 1993 Swedish Open

Final
- Champion: (Austria) Horst Skoff
- Runner-up: (Haiti) Ronald Agénor
- Score: 7–5, 1–6, 6–0

Details
- Draw: 32
- Seeds: 8

Events
Singles	Doubles
← 1992 ·	Swedish Open	· 1994 →

Magnus Gustafsson was the defending champion, but lost in the second round to Tomás Carbonell.

Horst Skoff won the title by defeating Ronald Agénor 7–5, 1–6, 6–0 in the final.

== Seeds ==
1. (Sweden) Henrik Holm (first round)
2. (Sweden) Magnus Gustafsson (second round)
3. (Sweden) Jonas Svensson (first round)
4. (Spain) Jordi Arrese (first round)
5. (Sweden) Christian Bergström (semifinals)
6. (Australia) Richard Fromberg (quarterfinals)
7. (Sweden) Nicklas Kulti (quarterfinals)
8. (Sweden) Magnus Larsson (semifinals)

== Draw ==
=== Key ===
- Q = Qualifier
- WC = Wild card
- LL = Lucky loser
- Alt = Alternate
- ITF = ITF entry
- PR = Protected ranking
- SR = Special ranking
- SE = Special exempt
- JE = Junior exempt
- JR = Junior Accelerator Programme entrant
- CO = College Accelerator Programme entrant
- NG = Next Gen Accelerator Program entrant
- w/o = Walkover
- r = Retired
- d = Defaulted

=== Finals ===
Semifinals
(Austria) Horst Skoff	6	6
5	(Sweden) Christian Bergström	4	4
(Haiti) Ronald Agénor	6	6
8	(Sweden) Magnus Larsson	4	3

Final
(Austria) Horst Skoff	7	1	6
(Haiti) Ronald Agénor	5	6	0

=== Top half ===
First round
1	(Sweden) H Holm	4	6
(Austria) H Skoff	6	7
(Belgium) B Wuyts	6	7
(Argentina) M Jaite	4	6
LL	(Sweden) J Gunnarsson	6	6
Q	(Denmark) P Langvardt	4	2
(Sweden) J Björkman	4	1
7	(Sweden) N Kulti	6	6
3/WC	(Sweden) J Svensson	6	1
(Spain) M Górriz	7	6
WC	(Croatia) G Prpić	0	2
(Sweden) T Enqvist	6	6
Q	(Sweden) T Nydahl	2	6	4
Q	(Norway) C Ruud	6	4	6
(Czech Republic) D Vacek	6	5	2
5	(Sweden) C Bergström	3	7	6

Second round
(Austria) H Skoff	7	3	6
(Belgium) B Wuyts	6	6	4
LL	(Sweden) J Gunnarsson	6	1
7	(Sweden) N Kulti	7	6
(Spain) M Górriz	7	6
(Sweden) T Enqvist	5	3
Q	(Norway) C Ruud	3	6	4
5	(Sweden) C Bergström	6	1	6

Quarterfinals
(Austria) H Skoff	6	6
7	(Sweden) N Kulti	3	4
(Spain) M Górriz	4	7	4
5	(Sweden) C Bergström	6	6	6

Semifinals
(Austria) H Skoff	6	6
5	(Sweden) C Bergström	4	4

=== Bottom half ===
First round
6	(Australia) R Fromberg	6	6
(Spain) J Burillo	1	4
(Spain) A Berasategui	3	2
(Portugal) J Cunha e Silva	6	6
(Argentina) D Orsanic	3	4
(Haiti) R Agénor	6	6
(Sweden) L Jönsson	6	6
4	(Spain) J Arrese	3	2
8	(Sweden) M Larsson	7	7
(Sweden) A Järryd	6	5
(Spain) J Francisco Altur	6	6	6
Q	(Sweden) M Tillström	3	7	2
(Uruguay) D Pérez	0	2
(Spain) T Carbonell	6	6
WC	(Sweden) M Pernfors	3	6
2	(Sweden) M Gustafsson	6	7

Second round
6	(Australia) R Fromberg	6	6
(Portugal) J Cunha e Silva	4	2
(Haiti) R Agénor	3	6	7
(Sweden) L Jönsson	6	1	6
8	(Sweden) M Larsson	6	6	6
(Spain) J Francisco Altur	1	7	4
(Spain) T Carbonell	7	6
2	(Sweden) M Gustafsson	6	4

Quarterfinals
6	(Australia) R Fromberg	7	5	2
(Haiti) R Agénor	6	7	6
8	(Sweden) M Larsson	3	6	7
(Spain) T Carbonell	6	2	5

Semifinals
(Haiti) R Agénor	6	6
8	(Sweden) M Larsson	4	3
