= 1992 Internazionali di Tennis di San Marino – Singles =

Singles
- 1992 Internazionali di Tennis di San Marino

Final
- Champion: (Czechoslovakia) Karel Nováček
- Runner-up: (Spain) Francisco Clavet
- Score: 7–5, 6–2

Details
- Draw: 32 (3WC/4Q)
- Seeds: 8

Events
Singles	Doubles
← 1991 ·	San Marino GO&FUN Open	· 1993 →

Guillermo Pérez Roldán was the two-time defending champion but did not compete this year.

Karel Nováček won the title by defeating Francisco Clavet 7–5, 6–2 in the final.

== Seeds ==
1. (Czechoslovakia) Karel Nováček (champion)
2. (Spain) Francisco Clavet (final)
3. (Spain) Javier Sánchez (second round)
4. (Spain) Francisco Roig (second round)
5. (Sweden) Nicklas Kulti (second round)
6. (France) Thierry Champion (first round)
7. (France) Frédéric Fontang (first round)
8. (Uruguay) Marcelo Filippini (second round)

== Draw ==
=== Key ===
- Q = Qualifier
- WC = Wild card
- LL = Lucky loser
- Alt = Alternate
- SE = Special exempt
- PR = Protected ranking
- ITF = ITF entry
- JE = Junior exempt
- w/o = Walkover
- r = Retired
- d = Defaulted
- SR = Special ranking

=== Finals ===
Semifinals
1	(Czechoslovakia) Karel Nováček	6	6
(Sweden) Lars Jönsson	4	1
(Haiti) Ronald Agénor	6^{5}	5
2/WC	(Spain) Francisco Clavet	7^{7}	7

Final
1	(Czechoslovakia) Karel Nováček	7	6
2/WC	(Spain) Francisco Clavet	5	2

=== Top half ===
First round
1	(Czechoslovakia) K Nováček	6	6
(Italy) C Pistolesi	2	2
(Spain) M Górriz	2	1
(Sweden) J Svensson	6	6
(Belgium) B Wuyts	6	5	7
(Argentina) R Azar	4	7	5
(Czechoslovakia) M Střelba	6	7^{7}
7	(France) F Fontang	4	6^{3}
4	(Spain) F Roig	6	3	6
(Ecuador) R Viver	2	6	3
(Spain) G López	6	6
Q	(Kenya) P Wekesa	3	3
(France) T Guardiola	0	4
(Sweden) L Jönsson	6	6
(Italy) M Cierro	5	7	3
5	(Sweden) N Kulti	7	5	6

Second round
1	(Czechoslovakia) K Nováček	6	6
(Sweden) J Svensson	4	4
(Belgium) B Wuyts	6	5
(Czechoslovakia) M Střelba	2	0^{r}
4	(Spain) F Roig	4	2
(Spain) G López	6	6
(Sweden) L Jönsson	5	6	6
5	(Sweden) N Kulti	7	2	1

Quarterfinals
1	(Czechoslovakia) K Nováček	4	6	6
(Belgium) B Wuyts	6	4	4
(Spain) G López	3	2
(Sweden) L Jönsson	6	6

Semifinals
1	(Czechoslovakia) K Nováček	6	6
(Sweden) L Jönsson	4	1

=== Bottom half ===
First round
6	(France) T Champion	4	2
Q	(Spain) JA Viloca	6	6
(Haiti) R Agénor	6	6
WC	(Russia) Y Kafelnikov	1	2
WC	(Italy) M Valeri	3	6^{3}
(United States) F Montana	6	7^{7}
(Czechoslovakia) M Damm	5	4
3	(Spain) J Sánchez	7	6
8	(Uruguay) M Filippini	6	2
(Spain) À Corretja	3	1^{r}
Q	(Czechoslovakia) L Pimek	3	1
SE	(Sweden) M Tillström	6	6
(Czechoslovakia) D Rikl	3	4
(Switzerland) C Mezzadri	6	6
Q	(Belgium) E Masso	1	6	6^{3}
2/WC	(Spain) F Clavet	6	1	7^{7}

Second round
Q	(Spain) JA Viloca	2	3
(Haiti) R Agénor	6	6
(United States) F Montana	7	6^{6}	6
3	(Spain) J Sánchez	5	7^{8}	4
8	(Uruguay) M Filippini	3	6^{8}
SE	(Sweden) M Tillström	6	7^{10}
(Switzerland) C Mezzadri	0	1
2/WC	(Spain) F Clavet	6	6

Quarterfinals
(Haiti) R Agénor	7	6
(United States) F Montana	5	4
SE	(Sweden) M Tillström	0	1
2/WC	(Spain) F Clavet	6	6

Semifinals
(Haiti) R Agénor	6^{5}	5
2/WC	(Spain) F Clavet	7^{7}	7
