= 1994 Trofeo Villa de Madrid – Singles =

Singles
- 1994 Trofeo Villa de Madrid

Final
- Champion: (Austria) Thomas Muster
- Runner-up: (Spain) Sergi Bruguera
- Score: 6–2, 3–6, 6–4, 7–5

Details
- Draw: 32 (3WC/4Q)
- Seeds: 8

Events
Singles	Doubles
- Madrid Tennis Grand Prix

Stefan Edberg was the defending champion, but lost in the quarterfinals to Jaime Yzaga.

Thomas Muster won the title by defeating Sergi Bruguera 6–2, 3–6, 6–4, 7–5 in the final.

== Seeds ==
1. (Sweden) Stefan Edberg (quarterfinals)
2. (Croatia) Goran Ivanišević (first round)
3. (Spain) Sergi Bruguera (final)
4. (Austria) Thomas Muster (champion)
5. (Spain) Carlos Costa (quarterfinals)
6. (United States) Ivan Lendl (quarterfinals)
7. (Russia) Alexander Volkov (first round)
8. (Spain) Alberto Berasategui (first round)

== Draw ==
Key

- Q = Qualifier
- WC = Wild card
- LL = Lucky loser
- Alt = Alternate
- ITF = ITF entry
- PR = Protected ranking
- SR = Special ranking
- SE = Special exempt
- JE = Junior exempt
- JR = Junior Accelerator Programme entrant
- CO = College Accelerator Programme entrant
- NG = Next Gen Accelerator Program entrant
- w/o = Walkover
- r = Retired
- d = Defaulted

=== Finals ===
Semifinals
(Peru) Jaime Yzaga	0	7	3
4	(Austria) Thomas Muster	6	5	6
3	(Spain) Sergi Bruguera	7^{7}	6
(Spain) Àlex Corretja	6^{5}	2

Final
4	(Austria) Thomas Muster	6	3	6	7
3	(Spain) Sergi Bruguera	2	6	4	5

=== Top half ===
First round
1	(Sweden) S Edberg	6	7
(Belgium) X Daufresne	2	5
(Italy) A Gaudenzi	6	6
Q	(Spain) F Roig	2	3
(Australia) R Fromberg	4	4
(Spain) J Sánchez	6	6
(Peru) J Yzaga	4	6	6
7	(Russia) A Volkov	6	4	1
4	(Austria) T Muster	6	6
Q	(France) F Fontang	0	3
(Argentina) G Markus	2	6	6
(Haiti) R Agénor	6	3	1
(Spain) J Burillo	3	4
(France) G Raoux	6	6
WC	(Spain) T Rascón	3	1
6	(United States) I Lendl	6	6

Second round
1	(Sweden) S Edberg	6	6
(Italy) A Gaudenzi	3	0
(Spain) J Sánchez	4	4
(Peru) J Yzaga	6	6
4	(Austria) T Muster	4	6	7^{7}
(Argentina) G Markus	6	1	6^{3}
(France) G Raoux	2	0
6	(United States) I Lendl	6	6

Quarterfinals
1	(Sweden) S Edberg	4	2
(Peru) J Yzaga	6	6
4	(Austria) T Muster	2	6	6
6	(United States) I Lendl	6	3	0

Semifinals
(Peru) J Yzaga	0	7	3
4	(Austria) T Muster	6	5	6

=== Bottom half ===
First round
5	(Spain) C Costa	6	6
Q	(France) T Champion	3	2
(France) JP Fleurian	6	7^{7}
WC	(Spain) R Carretero	1	6^{4}
(Austria) G Schaller	6	7
(Italy) R Furlan	0	5
Q	(Spain) G López	0	1
3	(Spain) S Bruguera	6	6
8	(Spain) A Berasategui	3	7^{7}	3
(Spain) À Corretja	6	6^{2}	6
(Spain) T Carbonell	6	6
(Italy) S Pescosolido	4	4
(Spain) J Arrese	6	3	6
(Argentina) H de la Peña	2	6	3
(Switzerland) J Hlasek	7^{8}	7^{8}
2/WC	(Croatia) G Ivanišević	6^{6}	6^{6}

Second round
5	(Spain) C Costa	6	6
(France) JP Fleurian	1	2
(Austria) G Schaller	1	4
3	(Spain) S Bruguera	6	6
(Spain) À Corretja	6	2	7^{7}
(Spain) T Carbonell	0	6	6^{5}
(Spain) J Arrese	7^{7}	6^{4}	3
(Switzerland) J Hlasek	6^{1}	7^{7}	6

Quarterfinals
5	(Spain) C Costa	6	2	4
3	(Spain) S Bruguera	3	6	6
(Spain) À Corretja	6	6
(Switzerland) J Hlasek	3	2

Semifinals
3	(Spain) S Bruguera	7^{7}	6
(Spain) À Corretja	6^{5}	2
