= 1991 Campionati Internazionali di San Marino – Doubles =

Doubles
- 1991 Campionati Internazionali di San Marino

Final
- Champions: (Spain) Jordi Arrese (Spain) Carlos Costa
- Runners-up: (Argentina) Christian Miniussi (Uruguay) Diego Pérez
- Score: 6–3, 3–6, 6–3

Details
- Draw: 16 (1WC/1Q)
- Seeds: 4

Events
Singles	Doubles
← 1990 ·	San Marino GO&FUN Open	· 1992 →

Vojtěch Flégl and Daniel Vacek were the defending champions, but both players chose to compete at Kitzbühel during the same week.

Jordi Arrese and Carlos Costa won the title by defeating Christian Miniussi and Diego Pérez 6–3, 3–6, 6–3 in the final.

== Seeds ==
1. (Spain) Marcos Górriz / (Venezuela) Alfonso Mora (first round)
2. (Sweden) Ola Jonsson / (Romania) Mihnea-Ion Năstase (quarterfinals)
3. (Argentina) Christian Miniussi / (Uruguay) Diego Pérez (final)
4. (Italy) Massimo Boscatto / (Italy) Massimo Cierro (semifinals)

== Draw ==
=== Key ===
- Q = Qualifier
- WC = Wild card
- LL = Lucky loser
- Alt = Alternate
- SE = Special exempt
- PR = Protected ranking
- ITF = ITF entry
- JE = Junior exempt
- w/o = Walkover
- r = Retired
- d = Defaulted
- SR = Special ranking

=== Draw ===
First round
1	(Spain) M Górriz (Venezuela) A Mora	6	6	2
(Czechoslovakia) S Doseděl (Netherlands) M Oosting	4	7	6
(Italy) C Brandi (Italy) R Furlan	6	7
(Portugal) J Cunha e Silva (Argentina) D Orsanic	1	5
3	(Argentina) C Miniussi (Uruguay) D Pérez	3	6	7
(Italy) M Ardinghi (Italy) M Visconti	6	1	5
(Spain) JF Altur (Argentina) M Ingaramo	2	7	4
(Portugal) N Marques (Switzerland) C Mezzadri	6	5	6
WC	(Argentina) F Davín (Argentina) G Pérez Roldán	6	6
(Finland) O Rahnasto (United States) J Sobel	4	2
Q	(Italy) E Rossi (Italy) M Valeri	2	1
4	(Italy) M Boscatto (Italy) M Cierro	6	6
(Spain) J Arrese (Spain) C Costa	6	6	6
(Czechoslovakia) J Čihák (Czechoslovakia) T Anzari	4	7	2
(Sweden) J Donar (Sweden) N Kulti	7	3	4
2	(Sweden) O Jonsson (Romania) MI Năstase	5	6	6

Quarterfinals
(Czechoslovakia) S Doseděl (Netherlands) M Oosting	6	1	6
(Italy) C Brandi (Italy) R Furlan	4	6	3
3	(Argentina) C Miniussi (Uruguay) D Pérez	6	6
(Portugal) N Marques (Switzerland) C Mezzadri	1	2
WC	(Argentina) F Davín (Argentina) G Pérez Roldán	3	r
4	(Italy) M Boscatto (Italy) M Cierro	6
(Spain) J Arrese (Spain) C Costa	6	0	7
2	(Sweden) O Jonsson (Romania) MI Năstase	4	6	6

Semifinals
(Czechoslovakia) S Doseděl (Netherlands) M Oosting	6	6	4
3	(Argentina) C Miniussi (Uruguay) D Pérez	7	3	6
4	(Italy) M Boscatto (Italy) M Cierro	6	1
(Spain) J Arrese (Spain) C Costa	7	6

Final
3	(Argentina) C Miniussi (Uruguay) D Pérez	3	6	3
(Spain) J Arrese (Spain) C Costa	6	3	6
