= 1989 Grand Prix Villa de Madrid =

- Date: 11–17 September
- Edition: 18th
- Category: Grand Prix
- Draw: 32S / 16D
- Prize money: $175,000
- Surface: Clay / outdoor
- Location: Madrid, Spain
- Venue: Club de Campo Villa de Madrid

Champions

Singles
- (Argentina) Martín Jaite

Doubles
- (Spain) Tomás Carbonell / (Spain) Carlos Costa
← 1988 ·	Madrid Tennis Grand Prix	· 1990 →

The 1989 Grand Prix Villa De Madrid, also known by its sponsored name Marlboro Open, was a men's tennis tournament played on outdoor clay courts at the Club de Campo Villa de Madrid in Madrid, Spain that was part of the 1989 Nabisco Grand Prix circuit. It was the 18th edition of the tournament and was played from 11 September until 17 September 1989. Second-seeded Martín Jaite won the singles title.

== Finals ==
=== Singles ===
(Argentina) Martín Jaite defeated (Spain) Jordi Arrese 6–3, 6–2

- It was Jaite's 2nd singles title and the 7th of his career.

=== Doubles ===
(Spain) Tomás Carbonell / (Spain) Carlos Costa defeated (Spain) Francisco Clavet / (Czechoslovakia) Tomáš Šmíd 7–5, 6–3

- It was Carbonell's 1st doubles title of the year and the 2nd of his career. It was Costa's only doubles title of the year and the 2nd of his career.
