= 1992 Swedish Open – Singles =

Singles
- 1992 Swedish Open

Final
- Champion: (Sweden) Magnus Gustafsson
- Runner-up: (Spain) Tomás Carbonell
- Score: 5–7, 7–5, 6–4

Details
- Draw: 32 (3WC/4Q)
- Seeds: 8

Events
Singles	Doubles
← 1991 ·	Swedish Open	· 1993 →

Magnus Gustafsson successfully defended his title, by defeating Tomás Carbonell 5–7, 7–5, 6–4 in the final.

== Seeds ==
1. (Commonwealth of Independent States) Alexander Volkov (first round)
2. (Sweden) Magnus Gustafsson (champion)
3. (Sweden) Magnus Larsson (quarterfinals)
4. (Spain) Jordi Arrese (semifinals)
5. (Sweden) Christian Bergström (quarterfinals)
6. (Argentina) Guillermo Pérez Roldán (semifinals)
7. (France) Arnaud Boetsch (quarterfinals)
8. (Italy) Renzo Furlan (first round)

== Draw ==
=== Key ===
- Q = Qualifier
- WC = Wild card
- LL = Lucky loser
- Alt = Alternate
- ITF = ITF entry
- PR = Protected ranking
- SR = Special ranking
- SE = Special exempt
- JE = Junior exempt
- JR = Junior Accelerator Programme entrant
- CO = College Accelerator Programme entrant
- NG = Next Gen Accelerator Program entrant
- w/o = Walkover
- r = Retired
- d = Defaulted

=== Finals ===
Semifinals
(Spain) Tomás Carbonell	7^{7}	3	6
6	(Argentina) Guillermo Pérez Roldán	6^{4}	6	3
4	(Spain) Jordi Arrese	5	3
2	(Sweden) Magnus Gustafsson	7	6

Final
(Spain) Tomás Carbonell	7	5	4
2	(Sweden) Magnus Gustafsson	5	7	6

=== Top half ===
First round
1	(Commonwealth of Independent States) A Volkov	4	6^{5}
(Sweden) L Jönsson	6	7^{7}
(Spain) T Carbonell	6	3	7
Q	(Australia) R Fromberg	4	6	5
(Sweden) J Svensson	1	5
Q	(Sweden) J Gunnarsson	6	7
(Uruguay) M Filippini	2	6	2
7	(France) A Boetsch	6	3	6
3	(Sweden) M Larsson	2	7^{9}	6
Q	(Sweden) D Engel	6	6^{7}	4
Q	(Denmark) F Fetterlein	6	6
WC	(Sweden) M Tillström	4	4
(Italy) C Pistolesi	6	6
(Netherlands) J Eltingh	1	3
(Germany) L Koslowski	2	0
6	(Argentina) G Pérez Roldán	6	6

Second round
(Sweden) L Jönsson	2	7^{7}	2
(Spain) T Carbonell	6	6^{5}	6
Q	(Sweden) J Gunnarsson	4	3
7	(France) A Boetsch	6	6
3	(Sweden) M Larsson	3	6	6
Q	(Denmark) F Fetterlein	6	4	2
(Italy) C Pistolesi	4	1
6	(Argentina) G Pérez Roldán	6	6

Quarterfinals
(Spain) T Carbonell	3	6	7^{7}
7	(France) A Boetsch	6	2	6^{3}
3	(Sweden) M Larsson	6	0	1
6	(Argentina) G Pérez Roldán	3	6	6

Semifinals
(Spain) T Carbonell	7^{7}	3	6
6	(Argentina) G Pérez Roldán	6^{4}	6	3

=== Bottom half ===
First round
5	(Sweden) C Bergström	7	6
(Brazil) L Mattar	5	4
(Argentina) M Jaite	6	6
(Sweden) A Järryd	2	2
(Sweden) N Kulti	6	2	2
(Spain) M Górriz	4	6	6
(Germany) M Naewie	5	7	2
4	(Spain) J Arrese	7	5	6
8	(Italy) R Furlan	5	2
WC	(Sweden) T Enqvist	7	6
(Germany) B Karbacher	3	2
WC	(Sweden) H Holm	6	6
(Spain) G López	7^{10}	6^{3}	4
(Brazil) J Oncins	6^{8}	7^{7}	6
(Argentina) C Miniussi	4	4
2	(Sweden) M Gustafsson	6	6

Second round
5	(Sweden) C Bergström	7	6
(Argentina) M Jaite	5	2
(Spain) M Górriz	4	6	2
4	(Spain) J Arrese	6	2	6
WC	(Sweden) T Enqvist	6	6
WC	(Sweden) H Holm	4	4
(Brazil) J Oncins	6	2	1
2	(Sweden) M Gustafsson	2	6	6

Quarterfinals
5	(Sweden) C Bergström	2	5
4	(Spain) J Arrese	6	7
WC	(Sweden) T Enqvist	6	3	3
2	(Sweden) M Gustafsson	2	6	6

Semifinals
4	(Spain) J Arrese	5	3
2	(Sweden) M Gustafsson	7	6
