= 1993 Swedish Open – Doubles =

Doubles
- 1993 Swedish Open

Final
- Champions: (Sweden) Henrik Holm (Sweden) Anders Järryd
- Runners-up: (United States) Brian Devening (Sweden) Tomas Nydahl
- Score: 6–1, 3–6, 6–3

Events
| Singles | Doubles |
| ← 1992 · | Swedish Open | · 1994 → |

Tomás Carbonell and Christian Miniussi were the defending champions, but Miniussi did not compete this year. Carbonell teamed up with Goran Prpić and lost in the first round to Mikael Pernfors and Nicklas Utgren.

Henrik Holm and Anders Järryd won the title by defeating Brian Devening and Tomas Nydahl 6–1, 3–6, 6–3 in the final.

== Seeds ==
1. (South Africa) David Adams / (Netherlands) Menno Oosting (first round)
2. (Sweden) Henrik Holm / (Sweden) Anders Järryd (champions)
3. (Sweden) Jan Apell / (Sweden) Jonas Björkman (semifinals)
4. (Denmark) Michael Mortensen / (Norway) Bent-Ove Pedersen (quarterfinals)

== Draw ==
=== Key ===
- Q = Qualifier
- WC = Wild card
- LL = Lucky loser
- Alt = Alternate
- ITF = ITF entry
- PR = Protected ranking
- SR = Special ranking
- SE = Special exempt
- JE = Junior exempt
- JR = Junior Accelerator Programme entrant
- CO = College Accelerator Programme entrant
- NG = Next Gen Accelerator Program entrant
- w/o = Walkover
- r = Retired
- d = Defaulted

=== Draw ===
First round
1 | (South Africa) D Adams (Netherlands) M Oosting | 6 | 3
(Australia) J Ireland (Czech Republic) D Vacek | 7 | 6
WC | (Sweden) M Pernfors (Sweden) N Utgren | 7 | 7
(Spain) T Carbonell (Croatia) G Prpić | 6 | 5
4 | (Denmark) M Mortensen (Norway) B-O Pedersen | 7 | 7
Q | (Spain) J Carlos Báguena (Spain) M Górriz | 6 | 5
(United States) T Nelson (Uruguay) D Pérez | 6 | 6 | 3
(United States) B Devening (Sweden) T Nydahl | 2 | 7 | 6
WC | (Sweden) C Bergström (Sweden) M Gustafsson | 6 | 6
(Portugal) J Cunha e Silva (United States) T Mercer | 3 | 3
(Sweden) J Donar (Sweden) O Jonsson | 4 | 6 | 3
3 | (Sweden) J Apell (Sweden) J Björkman | 6 | 3 | 6
(Sweden) M Renström (Sweden) M Tillström | 6 | 6
(Argentina) D Orsanic (Finland) O Rahnasto | 4 | 1
(United States) D Eisenman (United States) D Johnson | 6 | 6
2 | (Sweden) H Holm (Sweden) A Järryd | 7 | 7

Quarterfinals
(Australia) J Ireland (Czech Republic) D Vacek | 2 | 6 | 6
WC | (Sweden) M Pernfors (Sweden) N Utgren | 6 | 3 | 7
4 | (Denmark) M Mortensen (Norway) B-O Pedersen | 6 | 2 | 2
(United States) B Devening (Sweden) T Nydahl | 4 | 6 | 6
WC | (Sweden) C Bergström (Sweden) M Gustafsson | 4 | 3
3 | (Sweden) J Apell (Sweden) J Björkman | 6 | 6
(Sweden) M Renström (Sweden) M Tillström | 3 | 4
2 | (Sweden) H Holm (Sweden) A Järryd | 6 | 6

Semifinals
WC | (Sweden) M Pernfors (Sweden) N Utgren | 5 | 5
(United States) B Devening (Sweden) T Nydahl | 7 | 7
3 | (Sweden) J Apell (Sweden) J Björkman | 5 | 4
2 | (Sweden) H Holm (Sweden) A Järryd | 7 | 6

Final
(United States) B Devening (Sweden) T Nydahl | 1 | 6 | 3
2 | (Sweden) H Holm (Sweden) A Järryd | 6 | 3 | 6
