= 1991 Swedish Open =

- Date: 8–14 July
- Edition: 44th
- Category: World Series
- Draw: 32S / 16D
- Prize money: $225,000
- Surface: Clay / outdoor
- Location: Båstad, Sweden

Champions

Singles
- (Sweden) Magnus Gustafsson

Doubles
- (Sweden) Ronnie Båthman / (Sweden) Rikard Bergh
← 1990 ·	Swedish Open	· 1992 →

The 1991 Swedish Open was a men's tennis tournament played on outdoor clay courts in Båstad, Sweden that was part of the World Series of the 1991 ATP Tour. It was the 44th edition of the tournament and was held from 8 July until 14 July 1991. Second-seeded Magnus Gustafsson won the singles title.

== Finals ==
=== Singles ===
(Sweden) Magnus Gustafsson defeated (Argentina) Alberto Mancini, 6–1, 6–2

- It was Gustafsson's 2nd singles title of the year and the 3rd of his career.

=== Doubles ===
(Sweden) Ronnie Båthman / (Sweden) Rikard Bergh defeated (Sweden) Magnus Gustafsson / (Sweden) Anders Järryd, 6–4, 6–4
