= 1993 Swedish Open =

- Date: 5–11 July
- Edition: 46th
- Category: World Series
- Draw: 32S / 16D
- Prize money: $235,000
- Surface: Clay / outdoor
- Location: Båstad, Sweden

Champions

Singles
- (Austria) Horst Skoff

Doubles
- (Sweden) Henrik Holm / (Sweden) Anders Järryd
← 1992 ·	Swedish Open	· 1994 →

The 1993 Swedish Open was a men's tennis tournament played on outdoor clay courts in Båstad, Sweden that was part of the World Series of the 1993 ATP Tour. It was the 46th edition of the tournament and was held from 5 July until 11 July 1993. Unseeded Horst Skoff won the singles title.

== Finals ==
=== Singles ===
(Austria) Horst Skoff defeated (Haiti) Ronald Agénor, 7–5, 1–6, 6–0

- It was Skoff's 1st singles title of the year and the 4th of his career.

=== Doubles ===
(Sweden) Henrik Holm / (Sweden) Anders Järryd defeated (United States) Brian Devening / (Sweden) Tomas Nydahl, 6–1, 3–6, 6–3
