= 1992 Trofeo Villa de Madrid =

- Date: 27 April – 3 May
- Edition: 21st
- Category: World Series
- Draw: 32S / 16D
- Prize money: $700,000
- Surface: Clay / outdoor
- Location: Madrid, Spain
- Venue: Club de Tenis Chamartin

Champions

Singles
- (Spain) Sergi Bruguera

Doubles
- (United States) Patrick Galbraith / (United States) Patrick McEnroe
← 1991 ·	Madrid Tennis Grand Prix	· 1993 →

The 1992 Trofeo Villa de Madrid, also known by its sponsored name Trofeo Grupo Zeta Villa de Madrid, was a men's tennis tournament played on outdoor clay courts at the Club de Tenis Chamartin in Madrid, Spain that was part of the World Series of the 1992 ATP Tour. It was the 21st edition of the tournament and was played from 27 April until 3 May 1992. Fifth-seeded Sergi Bruguera won the singles title.

== Finals ==
=== Singles ===
(Spain) Sergi Bruguera defeated (Spain) Carlos Costa 7–6^{(8–6)}, 6–2, 6–2

- It was Bruguera's 1st singles title of the year and the 4th of his career.

=== Doubles ===
(United States) Patrick Galbraith / (United States) Patrick McEnroe defeated (Spain) Francisco Clavet / (Spain) Carlos Costa 6–3, 6–2

- It was Galbraith's 2nd doubles title of the year and the 9th of his career. It was McEnroe's 1stdoubles title of the year and 7th of his career.
