= 1991 Campionati Internazionali di San Marino – Singles =

Singles
- 1991 Campionati Internazionali di San Marino

Final
- Champion: (Argentina) Guillermo Pérez Roldán
- Runner-up: (France) Frédéric Fontang
- Score: 6–3, 6–1

Details
- Draw: 32 (3WC/4Q/1LL)
- Seeds: 8

Events
Singles	Doubles
← 1990 ·	San Marino GO&FUN Open	· 1992 →

Guillermo Pérez Roldán successfully defended his title, by defeating Frédéric Fontang 6–3, 6–1 in the final.

== Seeds ==
1. (Argentina) Guillermo Pérez Roldán (champion)
2. (Spain) Jordi Arrese (second round)
3. (Sweden) Nicklas Kulti (quarterfinals)
4. (Argentina) Franco Davín (quarterfinals)
5. (Italy) Renzo Furlan (semifinals)
6. (Argentina) Roberto Azar (semifinals)
7. (Portugal) Nuno Marques (second round)
8. (Spain) José Francisco Altur (first round)

== Draw ==
=== Key ===
- Q = Qualifier
- WC = Wild card
- LL = Lucky loser
- Alt = Alternate
- SE = Special exempt
- PR = Protected ranking
- ITF = ITF entry
- JE = Junior exempt
- w/o = Walkover
- r = Retired
- d = Defaulted
- SR = Special ranking

=== Finals ===
Semifinals
1	(Argentina) Guillermo Pérez Roldán	6	6
5	(Italy) Renzo Furlan	2	2
6	(Argentina) Roberto Azar	2	2
(France) Frédéric Fontang	6	6

Final
1	(Argentina) Guillermo Pérez Roldán	6	6
(France) Frédéric Fontang	3	1

=== Top half ===
First round
1	(Argentina) G Pérez Roldán	6	6
(Uruguay) D Pérez	0	1
Q	(Netherlands) M Oosting	6	6
WC	(Finland) O Rahnasto	0	1
(Spain) F Luna	2	1
(Czechoslovakia) L Němeček	6	6
(Spain) C Costa	6	7^{7}
8	(Spain) JF Altur	4	6^{5}
4	(Argentina) F Davín	6	6
Q	(Italy) M Ardinghi	1	1
(Portugal) J Cunha e Silva	6^{5}	3
(Italy) P Canè	7^{7}	6
(Italy) P Pambianco	7^{7}	4	6
(Czechoslovakia) S Doseděl	6^{2}	6	2
(Argentina) C Miniussi	3	1
5	(Italy) R Furlan	6	6

Second round
1	(Argentina) G Pérez Roldán	2	6	7^{7}
Q	(Netherlands) M Oosting	6	0	6^{4}
(Czechoslovakia) L Němeček	2	2
(Spain) C Costa	6	6
4	(Argentina) F Davín	7^{7}	7
(Italy) P Canè	6^{2}	5
(Italy) P Pambianco	4	2
5	(Italy) R Furlan	6	6

Quarterfinals
1	(Argentina) G Pérez Roldán	5	6	6
(Spain) C Costa	7	2	1
4	(Argentina) F Davín	2	3
5	(Italy) R Furlan	6	6

Semifinals
1	(Argentina) G Pérez Roldán	6	6
5	(Italy) R Furlan	2	2

=== Bottom half ===
First round
6	(Argentina) R Azar	6	6
(Italy) M Cierro	3	1
(Argentina) D Orsanic	6	6
(Czechoslovakia) V Roubíček	2	2
(Spain) M Górriz	6	6
(Czechoslovakia) T Anzari	4	2
Q	(United States) J Sobel	1	1
3/WC	(Sweden) N Kulti	6	6
7	(Portugal) N Marques	6	7
(Argentina) M Ingaramo	3	5
LL	(Italy) M Visconti	6^{3}	3
WC	(Switzerland) C Mezzadri	7^{7}	6
(France) F Fontang	6	6
Q	(Romania) MI Năstase	3	4
(Chile) P Rebolledo	7	2	2
2	(Spain) J Arrese	5	6	6

Second round
6	(Argentina) R Azar	6	2	6
(Argentina) D Orsanic	4	6	4
(Spain) M Górriz	3	2
3/WC	(Sweden) N Kulti	6	6
7	(Portugal) N Marques	3	3
WC	(Switzerland) C Mezzadri	6	6
(France) F Fontang	6	6
2	(Spain) J Arrese	3	0

Quarterfinals
6	(Argentina) R Azar	3	7	6
3/WC	(Sweden) N Kulti	6	5	4
WC	(Switzerland) C Mezzadri	4	0
(France) F Fontang	6	6

Semifinals
6	(Argentina) R Azar	2	2
(France) F Fontang	6	6
