= 1992 Swedish Open – Doubles =

Doubles
- 1992 Swedish Open

Final
- Champions: (Spain) Tomás Carbonell (Argentina) Christian Miniussi
- Runners-up: (Sweden) Christian Bergström (Sweden) Magnus Gustafsson
- Score: 6–4, 7–5

Events
Singles	Doubles
← 1991 ·	Swedish Open	· 1993 →

Ronnie Båthman and Rikard Bergh were the defending champions, but none competed this year.

Tomás Carbonell and Christian Miniussi won the title by defeating Christian Bergström and Magnus Gustafsson 6–4, 7–5 in the final.

== Seeds ==
1. (Netherlands) Jacco Eltingh / (Netherlands) Tom Kempers (first round)
2. (Spain) Tomás Carbonell / (Argentina) Christian Miniussi (champions)
3. (Sweden) Jan Apell / (Sweden) Anders Järryd (semifinals)
4. (Brazil) Luiz Mattar / (Brazil) Jaime Oncins (first round)

== Draw ==
=== Key ===
- Q = Qualifier
- WC = Wild card
- LL = Lucky loser
- Alt = Alternate
- ITF = ITF entry
- PR = Protected ranking
- SR = Special ranking
- SE = Special exempt
- JE = Junior exempt
- JR = Junior Accelerator Programme entrant
- CO = College Accelerator Programme entrant
- NG = Next Gen Accelerator Program entrant
- w/o = Walkover
- r = Retired
- d = Defaulted

=== Draw ===
First round
1	(Netherlands) J Eltingh (Netherlands) T Kempers	4	6
(Uruguay) M Filippini (Uruguay) D Pérez	6	7
WC	(Sweden) C Bergström (Sweden) M Gustafsson	6	7
(United States) B Devening (United States) M Jensen	2	5
4	(Brazil) L Mattar (Brazil) J Oncins	2	4
(Norway) BO Pedersen (Finland) O Rahnasto	6	6
(Germany) M Naewie (Netherlands) M Oosting	5	6	6
WC	(Sweden) N Kulti (Sweden) J Svensson	7	4	2
(Spain) J Arrese (Spain) M Górriz	1	2
Q	(Sweden) M Renström (Sweden) M Tillström	6	6
(Sweden) P Henricsson (Sweden) O Jonsson	6	3	3
3	(Sweden) J Apell (Sweden) A Järryd	2	6	6
(Sweden) J Gunnarsson (Sweden) M Larsson	4	6	6
(Sweden) H Holm (Sweden) N Holm	6	4	3
(United States) D Eisenman (Mexico) G Martínez	4	7	3
2	(Spain) T Carbonell (Argentina) C Miniussi	6	6	6

Quarterfinals
(Uruguay) M Filippini (Uruguay) D Pérez	1	4
WC	(Sweden) C Bergström (Sweden) M Gustafsson	6	6
(Norway) BO Pedersen (Finland) O Rahnasto	6	3	6
(Germany) M Naewie (Netherlands) M Oosting	2	6	7
Q	(Sweden) M Renström (Sweden) M Tillström	5	6	4
3	(Sweden) J Apell (Sweden) A Järryd	7	4	6
(Sweden) J Gunnarsson (Sweden) M Larsson	3	6	6
2	(Spain) T Carbonell (Argentina) C Miniussi	6	4	7

Semifinals
WC	(Sweden) C Bergström (Sweden) M Gustafsson	6	6	6
(Germany) M Naewie (Netherlands) M Oosting	7	2	4
3	(Sweden) J Apell (Sweden) A Järryd	4	6	1
2	(Spain) T Carbonell (Argentina) C Miniussi	6	0	6

Final
WC	(Sweden) C Bergström (Sweden) M Gustafsson	4	5
2	(Spain) T Carbonell (Argentina) C Miniussi	6	7
