= 1991 Swedish Open – Doubles =

Doubles
- 1991 Swedish Open

Final
- Champions: (Sweden) Ronnie Båthman (Sweden) Rikard Bergh
- Runners-up: (Sweden) Magnus Gustafsson (Sweden) Anders Järryd
- Score: 6–4, 6–4

Details
- Draw: 16
- Seeds: 4

Events
Singles	Doubles
← 1990 ·	Swedish Open	· 1992 →

Ronnie Båthman and Rikard Bergh successfully defended their title, by defeating Magnus Gustafsson and Anders Järryd 6–4, 6–4 in the final.

== Seeds ==
1. (United States) Luke Jensen / (Australia) Laurie Warder (quarterfinals)
2. (Sweden) Rikard Bergh / (Sweden) Ronnie Båthman (champions)
3. (Spain) Tomás Carbonell / (Spain) Marcos Górriz (quarterfinals)
4. (United States) Shelby Cannon / (The Bahamas) Roger Smith (first round)

== Draw ==
=== Key ===
- Q = Qualifier
- WC = Wild card
- LL = Lucky loser
- Alt = Alternate
- ITF = ITF entry
- PR = Protected ranking
- SR = Special ranking
- SE = Special exempt
- JE = Junior exempt
- JR = Junior Accelerator Programme entrant
- CO = College Accelerator Programme entrant
- NG = Next Gen Accelerator Program entrant
- w/o = Walkover
- r = Retired
- d = Defaulted

=== Draw ===
First round
1	(United States) L Jensen (Australia) L Warder	6	6	6
(Belgium) E Masso (Denmark) M Mortensen	7	4	4
(Australia) J Anderson (New Zealand) B Derlin	7	7
(Sweden) P Henricsson (Sweden) N Utgren	6	6
4	(United States) S Cannon (The Bahamas) R Smith	6	5	5
(Sweden) M Gustafsson (Sweden) A Järryd	4	7	7
(Sweden) J Apell (Sweden) D Engel	7	2	2
(Netherlands) M Koevermans (France) C Pioline	6	6	6
(Sweden) J Gunnarsson (Sweden) T Svantesson	6	3	6
(Finland) O Rahnasto (United States) J Sobel	3	6	3
Q	(Sweden) L Jönsson (Sweden) N Kroon	5	1
3	(Spain) T Carbonell (Spain) M Górriz	7	6
(Sweden) J Donar (Sweden) O Jonsson	6	6
(Sweden) N Holm (Sweden) L-A Wahlgren	2	1
WC	(Sweden) M Renström (Sweden) M Tillström	6	4	5
2	(Sweden) R Bergh (Sweden) R Båthman	3	6	7

Quarterfinals
1	(United States) L Jensen (Australia) L Warder	2	2
(Australia) J Anderson (New Zealand) B Derlin	6	6
(Sweden) M Gustafsson (Sweden) A Järryd	7	6
(Netherlands) M Koevermans (France) C Pioline	6	1
(Sweden) J Gunnarsson (Sweden) T Svantesson	4	6	6
3	(Spain) T Carbonell (Spain) M Górriz	6	3	2
(Sweden) J Donar (Sweden) O Jonsson	2	4
2	(Sweden) R Bergh (Sweden) R Båthman	6	6

Semifinals
(Australia) J Anderson (New Zealand) B Derlin	2	3
(Sweden) M Gustafsson (Sweden) A Järryd	6	6
(Sweden) J Gunnarsson (Sweden) T Svantesson	1	5
2	(Sweden) R Bergh (Sweden) R Båthman	6	7

Final
(Sweden) M Gustafsson (Sweden) A Järryd	4	4
2	(Sweden) R Bergh (Sweden) R Båthman	6	6
