= 1992 Grand Prix Hassan II – Singles =

Tennis tournament

Singles
- 1992 Grand Prix Hassan II

Final
- Champion: (Argentina) Guillermo Pérez Roldán
- Runner-up: (Spain) Germán López
- Score: 2–6, 7–5, 6–3

Details
- Draw: 32
- Seeds: 8

Events
Singles	Doubles
← 1990 ·	Grand Prix Hassan II	· 1993 →

Guillermo Pérez Roldán won the title, and defeated Germán López 2–6, 7–5, 6–3 in the final.

== Seeds ==
1. (Austria) Thomas Muster (second round)
2. (Argentina) Guillermo Pérez Roldán (champion)
3. (Germany) Lars Koslowski (first round)
4. (Spain) Germán López (final)
5. (Argentina) Roberto Azar (second round)
6. (Italy) Claudio Pistolesi (first round)
7. (Belgium) Eduardo Masso (first round)
8. (Belgium) Bart Wuyts (semifinals)

== Draw ==
=== Key ===
- Q = Qualifier
- WC = Wild card
- LL = Lucky loser
- Alt = Alternate
- SE = Special exempt
- PR = Protected ranking
- ITF = ITF entry
- JE = Junior exempt
- w/o = Walkover
- r = Retired
- d = Defaulted
- SR = Special ranking

=== Finals ===
Semifinals
8	(Belgium) Bart Wuyts	0	0
4	(Spain) Germán López	6	6
Q	(Spain) Alberto Berasategui	4	2
2	(Argentina) Guillermo Pérez Roldán	6	6

Final
4	(Spain) Germán López	6	5	3
2	(Argentina) Guillermo Pérez Roldán	2	7	6

=== Top half ===
First round
WC/1	(Austria) T Muster	6	6
Q	(Czechoslovakia) V Roubicek	2	4
(Italy) M Cierro	5	3
WC	(Morocco) Y El Aynaoui	7	6
(Czechoslovakia) M Vajda	0	4
(Spain) M A Górriz	6	6
(Netherlands) J Eltingh	4	4
8	(Belgium) B Wuyts	6	6
4	(Spain) G López	6	3	6
(Switzerland) C Mezzadri	4	6	4
(Germany) M Naewie	6	6
Q	(Spain) J C Báguena	3	2
WC	(Morocco) K Alami	7^{9}	3	4
(Uruguay) M Filippini	6^{7}	6	6
(Czechoslovakia) M Damm	4	3
5	(Argentina) R Azar	6	6

Second round
WC/1	(Austria) T Muster	6	4	3
WC	(Morocco) Y El Aynaoui	4	6	6
(Spain) M A Górriz	3	6	4
8	(Belgium) B Wuyts	6	3	6
4	(Spain) G López	6	4	6
(Germany) M Naewie	4	6	4
(Uruguay) M Filippini	6	6^{3}	6
5	(Argentina) R Azar	2	7^{7}	3

Quarterfinals
WC	(Morocco) Y El Aynaoui	6	5	1
8	(Belgium) B Wuyts	1	7	6
4	(Spain) G López	6	6
(Uruguay) M Filippini	3	2

Semifinals
8	(Belgium) B Wuyts	0	0
4	(Spain) G López	6	6

=== Bottom half ===
First round
6	(Italy) C Pistolesi	4	2
(Peru) P Arraya	6	6
(Argentina) F Davín	4	6	2
Q	(Spain) A Berasategui	6	2	6
(Germany) K Braasch	6	2	4
Q	(Germany) D Prinosil	2	6	6
(Netherlands) M Koevermans	7^{7}	6
3	(Germany) L Koslowski	6^{3}	3
7	(Belgium) E Masso	3	1
(Argentina) H de la Peña	6	6
(Zimbabwe) B Black	6	3	3
(Brazil) L Mattar	3	6	6
(Czechoslovakia) M Střelba	6	7
(France) T Guardiola	4	5
(Sweden) L Jönsson	7	6^{4}	0
2	(Argentina) G Pérez Roldán	5	7^{7}	6

Second round
(Peru) P Arraya	1	4
Q	(Spain) A Berasategui	6	6
Q	(Germany) D Prinosil	3	3
(Netherlands) M Koevermans	6	6
(Argentina) H de la Peña	7	2	2
(Brazil) L Mattar	5	6	6
(Czechoslovakia) M Střelba	3	1
2	(Argentina) G Pérez Roldán	6	6

Quarterfinals
Q	(Spain) A Berasategui	6	7
(Netherlands) M Koevermans	3	5
(Brazil) L Mattar	0	3
2	(Argentina) G Pérez Roldán	6	6

Semifinals
Q	(Spain) A Berasategui	4	2
2	(Argentina) G Pérez Roldán	6	6
