= 1992 Grand Prix Hassan II – Doubles =

Tennis tournament

Doubles
- 1992 Grand Prix Hassan II

Final
- Champions: (Argentina) Horacio de la Peña (Mexico) Jorge Lozano
- Runners-up: (Latvia) Ģirts Dzelde (United States) T.J. Middleton
- Score: 2–6, 6–4, 7–6

Details
- Draw: 16
- Seeds: 4

Events
Singles	Doubles
- Grand Prix Hassan II

The tournament was not held in 1991.

Horacio de la Peña and Jorge Lozano won in the final 2–6, 6–4, 7–6, against Ģirts Dzelde and T.J. Middleton.

== Seeds ==
1. (Netherlands) Mark Koevermans / (Germany) Udo Riglewski (quarterfinals)
2. (Netherlands) Jacco Eltingh / (Netherlands) Tom Kempers (semifinals)
3. (South Africa) David Adams / (Czechoslovakia) Martin Damm (quarterfinals)
4. (Zimbabwe) Byron Black / (Kenya) Paul Wekesa (quarterfinals)

== Draw ==
Key

- Q = Qualifier
- WC = Wild card
- LL = Lucky loser
- Alt = Alternate
- ITF = ITF entry
- PR = Protected ranking
- SR = Special ranking
- SE = Special exempt
- JE = Junior exempt
- JR = Junior Accelerator Programme entrant
- CO = College Accelerator Programme entrant
- NG = Next Gen Accelerator Program entrant
- w/o = Walkover
- r = Retired
- d = Defaulted

=== Draw ===
First round
1	(Netherlands) M Koevermans (Germany) U Riglewski	6	6
WC	(Morocco) K Alami (Morocco) Y El Aynaoui	2	4
Q	(United States) M Briggs (United States) T Kronemann	6	6
(Spain) JC Báguena (Spain) MA Gorriz	2	4
3	(South Africa) D Adams (Czechoslovakia) M Damm	6	6
WC	(Morocco) Salahaddine Adbib (Morocco) H Arazi	3	1
(Argentina) H de la Peña (Mexico) J Lozano	7	6
(France) T Benhabiles (Argentina) G Garetto	5	2
(Latvia) Ģ Dzelde (United States) T.J. Middleton	7	6
(Uruguay) D Pérez (Spain) V Solves	6	4
(Sweden) O Jonsson (Sweden) N Utgren	4	4
4	(Zimbabwe) B Black (Kenya) P Wekesa	6	6
(Czechoslovakia) J Čihák (Portugal) J Cunha e Silva	6	6
(Germany) M-K Goellner (Germany) D Prinosil	2	1
(Netherlands) M Oosting (Finland) O Rahnasto	3	4
2	(Netherlands) J Eltingh (Netherlands) T Kempers	6	6

Quarterfinals
1	(Netherlands) M Koevermans (Germany) U Riglewski	3	2
Q	(United States) M Briggs (United States) T Kronemann	6	6
3	(South Africa) D Adams (Czechoslovakia) M Damm	6	6
(Argentina) H de la Peña (Mexico) J Lozano	7	7
(Latvia) Ģ Dzelde (United States) T.J. Middleton	1	7	6
4	(Zimbabwe) B Black (Kenya) P Wekesa	6	5	2
(Czechoslovakia) J Čihák (Portugal) J Cunha e Silva	6	5	3
2	(Netherlands) J Eltingh (Netherlands) T Kempers	2	7	6

Semifinals
Q	(United States) M Briggs (United States) T Kronemann	6	4	6
(Argentina) H de la Peña (Mexico) J Lozano	3	6	7
(Latvia) Ģ Dzelde (United States) T.J. Middleton	7	2	7
2	(Netherlands) J Eltingh (Netherlands) T Kempers	6	6	6

Final
(Argentina) H de la Peña (Mexico) J Lozano	2	6	7
(Latvia) Ģ Dzelde (United States) T.J. Middleton	6	4	6
