= 1992 Internazionali di Tennis di San Marino – Doubles =

Doubles
- 1992 Internazionali di Tennis di San Marino

Final
- Champions: (Sweden) Nicklas Kulti (Sweden) Mikael Tillström
- Runners-up: (Italy) Cristian Brandi (Italy) Federico Mordegan
- Score: 6–2, 6–2

Details
- Draw: 16 (2WC/1Q)
- Seeds: 4

Events
Singles	Doubles
← 1991 ·	San Marino GO&FUN Open	· 1993 →

Jordi Arrese and Carlos Costa were the defending champions, but none competed this year. Arrese chose to compete at the Summer Olympics in Barcelona, winning the silver medal in singles.

Nicklas Kulti and Mikael Tillström won the title by defeating Cristian Brandi and Federico Mordegan 6–2, 6–2 in the final.

== Seeds ==
1. (Czechoslovakia) Libor Pimek / (Kenya) Paul Wekesa (semifinals)
2. (South Africa) David Adams / (Australia) Carl Limberger (quarterfinals)
3. (Czechoslovakia) Vojtěch Flégl / (Czechoslovakia) Karel Nováček (first round)
4. (South Africa) Brent Haygarth / (United States) Francisco Montana (semifinals)

== Draw ==
=== Key ===
- Q = Qualifier
- WC = Wild card
- LL = Lucky loser
- Alt = Alternate
- ITF = ITF entry
- PR = Protected ranking
- SR = Special ranking
- SE = Special exempt
- JE = Junior exempt
- JR = Junior Accelerator Programme entrant
- CO = College Accelerator Programme entrant
- NG = Next Gen Accelerator Program entrant
- w/o = Walkover
- r = Retired
- d = Defaulted

=== Draw ===
First round
1	(Czechoslovakia) L Pimek (Kenya) P Wekesa	6	6
(United States) M Jensen (Czechoslovakia) M Střelba	2	0
(Spain) J Sánchez (Spain) JA Viloca	5	7	3
(Spain) M Górriz (Spain) F Roig	7	6	6
3	(Czechoslovakia) V Flégl (Czechoslovakia) K Nováček	6	0
(Sweden) N Kulti (Sweden) M Tillström	7	6
(Uruguay) M Filippini (Argentina) G Luza	3	4
(Sweden) P Henricsson (Sweden) O Jonsson	6	6
(Czechoslovakia) D Rikl (Czechoslovakia) R Vogel	7	6	7
(Italy) M Cierro (Italy) U Colombini	5	7	6
WC	(Haiti) R Agénor (Italy) C Pistolesi	3	5
4	(South Africa) B Haygarth (United States) F Montana	6	7
Q	(Russia) Y Kafelnikov (United States) Robert Pellizzi	3	6	6
(Italy) C Brandi (Italy) F Mordegan	6	3	7
WC	(Belgium) E Masso (Switzerland) C Mezzadri	3	6	5
2	(South Africa) D Adams (Australia) C Limberger	6	4	7

Quarterfinals
1	(Czechoslovakia) L Pimek (Kenya) P Wekesa	6	1	6
(Spain) M Górriz (Spain) F Roig	3	6	2
(Sweden) N Kulti (Sweden) M Tillström	6	6	6
(Sweden) P Henricsson (Sweden) O Jonsson	3	7	3
(Czechoslovakia) D Rikl (Czechoslovakia) R Vogel	3	5
4	(South Africa) B Haygarth (United States) F Montana	6	7
(Italy) C Brandi (Italy) F Mordegan	6	3	6
2	(South Africa) D Adams (Australia) C Limberger	4	6	4

Semifinals
1	(Czechoslovakia) L Pimek (Kenya) P Wekesa	3	5
(Sweden) N Kulti (Sweden) M Tillström	6	7
4	(South Africa) B Haygarth (United States) F Montana	7	3	4
(Italy) C Brandi (Italy) F Mordegan	6	6	6

Final
(Sweden) N Kulti (Sweden) M Tillström	6	6
(Italy) C Brandi (Italy) F Mordegan	2	2
