= 1992 Grand Prix Hassan II =

Tennis tournament

- Date: 16–23 March
- Edition: 8th
- Category: World Series
- Draw: 32S / 16D
- Prize money: $130,000
- Surface: Clay / outdoor
- Location: Casablanca, Morocco

Champions

Singles
- (Argentina) Guillermo Pérez Roldán

Doubles
- (Argentina) Horacio de la Peña / (Mexico) Jorge Lozano
- Grand Prix Hassan II

The 1992 Grand Prix Hassan II was an Association of Tennis Professionals men's tennis tournament held in Casablanca, Morocco and played on outdoor clay courts. It was part of the World Series of the 1992 ATP Tour. It was the 8th edition of the tournament and was held from 16 March until 23 March 1992. Second-seeded Guillermo Pérez Roldán won the singles title.

== Finals ==
=== Singles ===
(Argentina) Guillermo Pérez Roldán defeated (Spain) Germán López 2–6, 7–5, 6–3

- It was Pérez-Roldán's only title of the year and the eighth of his career.

=== Doubles ===
(Argentina) Horacio de la Peña / (Mexico) Jorge Lozano defeated (Latvia) Ģirts Dzelde / (United States) T. J. Middleton 2–6, 6–4, 7–6

- It was de la Peña's first title of the year and the seventh of his career. It was Lozano's only title of the year and the eighth of his career.
