= 1993 Trofeo Villa de Madrid =

- Date: 26 April – 2 May
- Edition: 22nd
- Category: World Series
- Draw: 32S / 16D
- Prize money: $775,000
- Surface: Clay / outdoor
- Location: Madrid, Spain
- Venue: Club de Tenis Chamartin

Champions

Singles
- (Sweden) Stefan Edberg

Doubles
- (Spain) Tomás Carbonell / (Spain) Carlos Costa
← 1992 ·	Madrid Tennis Grand Prix	· 1994 →

The 1993 Trofeo Villa de Madrid, also known by its sponsored name Trofeo Grupo Zeta Villa de Madrid, was a men's tennis tournament played on outdoor clay courts at the Club de Tenis Chamartin in Madrid, Spain that was part of the World Series of the 1993 ATP Tour. It was the 22nd edition of the tournament and was played from 26 April until 2 May 1993. First-seeded Stefan Edberg won the singles title.

== Finals ==
=== Singles ===
(Sweden) Stefan Edberg defeated (Spain) Sergi Bruguera 6–3, 6–3, 6–2

- It was Edberg's only singles title of the year and the 37th of his career.

=== Doubles ===
(Spain) Tomás Carbonell / (Spain) Carlos Costa defeated (United States) Luke Jensen / (United States) Scott Melville 7–6, 6–2

- It was Carbonell's 1st doubles title of the year and the 9th of his career. It was Costa's 1st doubles title of the year and 4th of his career.
