= 1991 Swedish Open – Singles =

Singles
- 1991 Swedish Open

Final
- Champion: (Sweden) Magnus Gustafsson
- Runner-up: (Argentina) Alberto Mancini
- Score: 6–1, 6–2

Details
- Draw: 32
- Seeds: 8

Events
Singles	Doubles
← 1990 ·	Swedish Open	· 1992 →

Richard Fromberg was the defending champion, but did not compete this year.

Magnus Gustafsson won the title by defeating Alberto Mancini 6–1, 6–2 in the final.

== Seeds ==
1. (Russia) Andrei Cherkasov (first round)
2. (Sweden) Magnus Gustafsson (champion)
3. (Soviet Union) Alexander Volkov (semifinals)
4. (Sweden) Anders Järryd (first round)
5. (Uruguay) Marcelo Filippini (second round)
6. (Sweden) Nicklas Kulti (second round)
7. (Netherlands) Mark Koevermans (first round)
8. (Argentina) Alberto Mancini (final)

== Draw ==
=== Key ===
- Q = Qualifier
- WC = Wild card
- LL = Lucky loser
- Alt = Alternate
- ITF = ITF entry
- PR = Protected ranking
- SR = Special ranking
- SE = Special exempt
- JE = Junior exempt
- JR = Junior Accelerator Programme entrant
- CO = College Accelerator Programme entrant
- NG = Next Gen Accelerator Program entrant
- w/o = Walkover
- r = Retired
- d = Defaulted

=== Finals ===
Semifinals
8	(Argentina) Alberto Mancini	0	6	6
3	(Soviet Union) Alexander Volkov	6	3	2
(Sweden) Christian Bergström	6	3	2
2	(Sweden) Magnus Gustafsson	4	6	6

Final
8	(Argentina) Alberto Mancini	1	2
2	(Sweden) Magnus Gustafsson	6	6

=== Top half ===
First round
1	(Russia) A Cherkasov	3	2
(Sweden) M Larsson	6	6
Q	(Spain) M Górriz	3	6	3
Q	(Sweden) L-A Wahlgren	6	3	6
(Italy) C Pistolesi	6	6
(France) T Champion	4	0
Q	(Sweden) J Björkman	3	1
8	(Argentina) A Mancini	6	6
3	(Soviet Union) A Volkov	6	6
(Finland) V Paloheimo	4	4
(Sweden) M Pernfors	6	6
(Spain) J Aguilera	3	3
(Sweden) L Jonsson	6	6
(Spain) T Carbonell	3	4
(Belgium) B Wuyts	0^{r}
5	(Uruguay) M Filippini	2

Second round
(Sweden) M Larsson	6	6
Q	(Sweden) L-A Wahlgren	0	3
(Italy) C Pistolesi	6	3	2
8	(Argentina) A Mancini	3	6	6
3	(Soviet Union) A Volkov	6	4	6
(Sweden) M Pernfors	4	6	4
(Sweden) L Jonsson	6	6
5	(Uruguay) M Filippini	1	2

Quarterfinals
(Sweden) M Larsson	6	3	4
8	(Argentina) A Mancini	4	6	6
3	(Soviet Union) A Volkov	6	6
(Sweden) L Jonsson	2	1

Semifinals
8	(Argentina) A Mancini	0	6	6
3	(Soviet Union) A Volkov	6	3	2

=== Bottom half ===
First round
6	(Sweden) N Kulti	4	6	6
Q	(Australia) J Anderson	6	2	3
(Sweden) C Bergström	6	6
(Finland) A Rahunen	1	2
WC	(Sweden) T Enqvist	4	1
(Sweden) J Gunnarsson	6	6
(Belgium) E Masso	6	6
4	(Sweden) A Järryd	3	1
7	(Netherlands) M Koevermans	6	1	5
(Peru) P Arraya	3	6	7
WC	(Sweden) D Engel	1	7	6
(France) C Pioline	6	5	4
WC	(Sweden) N Kroon	7	4	6
(West Germany) P Kühnen	5	6	4
(Portugal) N Marques	0	5
2	(Sweden) M Gustafsson	6	7

Second round
6	(Sweden) N Kulti	2	1
(Sweden) C Bergström	6	6
(Sweden) J Gunnarsson	7	7
(Belgium) E Masso	5	6
(Peru) P Arraya	7	4	6
WC	(Sweden) D Engel	6	6	4
WC	(Sweden) N Kroon	4	7	1
2	(Sweden) M Gustafsson	6	6	6

Quarterfinals
(Sweden) C Bergström	3	6	6
(Sweden) J Gunnarsson	6	2	2
(Peru) P Arraya	1	2
2	(Sweden) M Gustafsson	6	6

Semifinals
(Sweden) C Bergström	6	3	2
2	(Sweden) M Gustafsson	4	6	6
