= 1994 Trofeo Villa de Madrid – Doubles =

Doubles
- 1994 Trofeo Villa de Madrid

Final
- Champions: (Sweden) Rikard Bergh (Netherlands) Menno Oosting
- Runners-up: (France) Jean-Philippe Fleurian (Switzerland) Jakob Hlasek
- Score: 6–3, 6–4

Details
- Draw: 16 (2WC/1Q)
- Seeds: 4

Events
Singles	Doubles
- Madrid Tennis Grand Prix

Tomás Carbonell and Carlos Costa were the defending champions, but lost in the first round to Jorge Lozano and Libor Pimek.

Rikard Bergh and Menno Oosting won the title by defeating Jean-Philippe Fleurian and Jakob Hlasek 6–3, 6–4 in the final.

== Seeds ==
1. (Canada) Grant Connell / (United States) Patrick Galbraith (semifinals)
2. (Netherlands) Hendrik Jan Davids / (South Africa) Piet Norval (quarterfinals)
3. (South Africa) Gary Muller / (South Africa) Danie Visser (quarterfinals)
4. (Mexico) Jorge Lozano / (Belgium) Libor Pimek (quarterfinals)

== Draw ==
Key

- Q = Qualifier
- WC = Wild card
- LL = Lucky loser
- Alt = Alternate
- ITF = ITF entry
- PR = Protected ranking
- SR = Special ranking
- SE = Special exempt
- JE = Junior exempt
- JR = Junior Accelerator Programme entrant
- CO = College Accelerator Programme entrant
- NG = Next Gen Accelerator Program entrant
- w/o = Walkover
- r = Retired
- d = Defaulted

=== Draw ===
First round
1	(Canada) G Connell (United States) P Galbraith	3	6	6
(Croatia) G Ivanišević (Spain) J Sánchez	6	3	4
WC	(Spain) J Arrese (Spain) A Berasategui	1	4
(United States) M Bauer (South Africa) B Talbot	6	6
3	(South Africa) G Muller (South Africa) D Visser	6	6
WC	(United States) I Lendl (Spain) T Rascón	3	4
(Sweden) R Bergh (Netherlands) M Oosting	6	6
(Spain) J Gisbert Schultze (Spain) F Roig	4	3
Q	(Italy) R Furlan (Russia) A Volkov	1	6	4
(Argentina) H de la Peña (Peru) J Yzaga	6	1	6
(Spain) T Carbonell (Spain) C Costa	1	7	4
4	(Mexico) J Lozano (Belgium) L Pimek	6	6	6
(Italy) C Brandi (Italy) F Mordegan	3	4
(France) JP Fleurian (Switzerland) J Hlasek	6	6
(South Africa) JL de Jager (United States) S Melville	6	5	3
2	(Netherlands) HJ Davids (South Africa) P Norval	4	7	6

Quarterfinals
1	(Canada) G Connell (United States) P Galbraith	6	7
(United States) M Bauer (South Africa) B Talbot	3	5
3	(South Africa) G Muller (South Africa) D Visser	4	6
(Sweden) R Bergh (Netherlands) M Oosting	6	7
(Argentina) H de la Peña (Peru) J Yzaga	7	6
4	(Mexico) J Lozano (Belgium) L Pimek	6	3
(France) JP Fleurian (Switzerland) J Hlasek	6	7
2	(Netherlands) HJ Davids (South Africa) P Norval	4	6

Semifinals
1	(Canada) G Connell (United States) P Galbraith	6	6
(Sweden) R Bergh (Netherlands) M Oosting	7	7
(Argentina) H de la Peña (Peru) J Yzaga	6	2
(France) JP Fleurian (Switzerland) J Hlasek	7	6

Final
(Sweden) R Bergh (Netherlands) M Oosting	6	6
(France) JP Fleurian (Switzerland) J Hlasek	3	4
