= 1989 Campionati Internazionali di San Marino =

- Date: 21–27 August
- Edition: 1st
- Category: Grand Prix
- Draw: 32S / 16D
- Prize money: $93,400
- Surface: Clay / outdoor
- Location: Serravalle, San Marino
- Venue: Centro Sportivo Serravalle

Champions

Singles
- (Spain) José Francisco Altur

Doubles
- (Italy) Simone Colombo / (Switzerland) Claudio Mezzadri
Campionati Internazionali di San Marino	· 1990 →

The 1989 Campionati Internazionali di San Marino was a men's tennis tournament played on outdoor clay courts at Centro Sportivo Serravalle in San Marino and was part of the 1989 Grand Prix. It was the inaugural edition of the tournament as an ATP Tour event and the second overall, following the initial challenger in 1988. It was held from 21 August until 27 August 1989. Unseeded José Francisco Altur, who entered the main draw as a qualifier, won the singles title.

== Finals ==
=== Singles ===
(Spain) José Francisco Altur defeated (Argentina) Roberto Azar 6–4, 6–1

- It was Francisco Altur's only singles title of his career.

=== Doubles ===
(Italy) Simone Colombo / (Switzerland) Claudio Mezzadri defeated (Argentina) Pablo Albano / (Argentina) Gustavo Luza 6–1, 4–6, 7–6
