= 1991 Campionati Internazionali di San Marino =

- Date: 29 July – 4 August
- Edition: 3rd
- Category: World Series
- Draw: 32S / 16D
- Prize money: $200,000
- Surface: Clay / outdoor
- Location: City of San Marino, San Marino

Champions

Singles
- (Argentina) Guillermo Pérez Roldán

Doubles
- (Spain) Jordi Arrese / (Spain) Carlos Costa
← 1990 ·	Campionati Internazionali di San Marino	· 1992 →

The 1991 Campionati Internazionali di San Marino was a men's tennis tournament played on outdoor clay courts at the Centro Tennis Cassa di Risparmio di Fonte dell'Ovo in the City of San Marino in San Marino and was part of the World Series of the 1991 ATP Tour. It was the third edition of the tournament and was held from 29 July until 4 August 1991. First-seeded Guillermo Pérez Roldán won his second consecutive singles title at the event.

== Finals ==
=== Singles ===
(Argentina) Guillermo Pérez Roldán defeated (France) Frédéric Fontang 6–3, 6–1

- It was Pérez Roldán's only singles title of the year and the 7th of his career.

=== Doubles ===
(Spain) Jordi Arrese / (Spain) Carlos Costa defeated (Argentina) Christian Miniussi / (Uruguay) Diego Pérez 6–3, 3–6, 6–3

== See also ==
- 1991 Volvo San Marino Open – women's tournament
