= 1994 Trofeo Villa de Madrid =

- Date: 25 April – 1 May
- Edition: 23rd
- Category: World Series
- Draw: 32S / 16D
- Prize money: $775,000
- Surface: Clay / outdoor
- Location: Madrid, Spain
- Venue: Club de Tenis Chamartin

Champions

Singles
- (Austria) Thomas Muster

Doubles
- (Sweden) Rikard Bergh / (Netherlands) Menno Oosting
- Madrid Tennis Grand Prix

The 1994 Trofeo Villa de Madrid, also known by its sponsored name Trofeo Grupo Zeta Villa de Madrid, was a men's tennis tournament played on outdoor clay courts at the Club de Tenis Chamartin in Madrid, Spain that was part of the World Series of the 1994 ATP Tour. It was the 23rd and last edition of the tournament and was played from 26 April until 1 May 1994. Fourth-seeded Thomas Muster won the singles title.

== Finals ==
=== Singles ===
(Austria) Thomas Muster defeated (Spain) Sergi Bruguera 6–2, 3–6, 6–4, 7–5

- It was Muster's 2nd singles title of the year and the 22nd of his career.

=== Doubles ===
(Sweden) Rikard Bergh / (Netherlands) Menno Oosting defeated (France) Jean-Philippe Fleurian / (Switzerland) Jakob Hlasek 6–3, 6–4

- It was Bergh's only doubles title of the year and the 6th and last of his career. It was Oosting's 2nd doubles title of the year and 4th of his career.
