= 1992 Internazionali di Tennis di San Marino =

- Date: 27 July – 2 August
- Edition: 4th
- Category: World Series
- Draw: 32S / 16D
- Prize money: $235,000
- Surface: Clay / outdoor
- Location: City of San Marino, San Marino

Champions

Singles
- (Czechoslovakia) Karel Nováček

Doubles
- (Sweden) Nicklas Kulti / (Sweden) Mikael Tillström
← 1991 ·	Campionati Internazionali di San Marino	· 1993 →

The 1992 Internazionali di Tennis di San Marino was a men's tennis tournament played on outdoor clay courts at the Centro Tennis Cassa di Risparmio di Fonte dell'Ovo in the City of San Marino in San Marino and was part of the World Series of the 1992 ATP Tour. It was the fourth edition of the tournament and was held from 27 July until 2 August 1992. First-seeded Karel Nováček won the singles title.

== Finals ==
=== Singles ===
(Czechoslovakia) Karel Nováček defeated (Spain) Francisco Clavet 7–5, 6–2

- It was Nováček's 2nd title of the year and the 9th of his career.

=== Doubles ===
(Sweden) Nicklas Kulti / (Sweden) Mikael Tillström defeated (Italy) Cristian Brandi / (Italy) Federico Mordegan 6–2, 6–2

== See also ==
- 1992 Internazionali di Tennis San Marino – women's tournament
