= 1975 Madrid Tennis Grand Prix =

- Date: 6–12 October
- Edition: 4th
- Category: Grand Prix (Group A)
- Draw: 64S / 32D
- Prize money: $75,000
- Surface: Clay / outdoor
- Location: Madrid, Spain
- Venue: Real Sociedad Hípica Española Club de Campo

Champions

Men's singles
- (Czechoslovakia) Jan Kodeš

Women's singles
- (West Germany) Heidi Eisterlehner

Men's doubles
- (Czechoslovakia) Jan Kodeš / (Romania) Ilie Năstase
- Madrid Tennis Grand Prix

The 1975 Madrid Tennis Grand Prix, also known as the Trofeo Meliá, was a combined men's and women's tennis tournament played on outdoor clay courts at the Real Sociedad Hípica Española Club de Campo in Madrid, Spain. The men's tournament was classified as Group A category and was part of the 1975 Grand Prix circuit. It was the fourth edition of the tournament and was held from 6 October through 12 October 1975. Jan Kodeš and Heidi Eisterlehner won the singles titles.

== Finals ==
=== Men's singles ===
(Czechoslovakia) Jan Kodeš defeated (Italy) Adriano Panatta 5–7, 2–6, 7–6, 6–2, 6–3

=== Women's singles ===
(West Germany) Heidi Eisterlehner defeated (United States) Janice Metcalf 2–6, 6–1, 6–1

=== Men's doubles ===
(Czechoslovakia) Jan Kodeš / (Romania) Ilie Năstase defeated (Spain) Juan Gisbert / (Spain) Manuel Orantes 7–6, 4–6, 9–7
