= VSZ Slovak Open =

Defunct tennis tournament
- Event name: Košice
- Tour: ATP Challenger Series
- Founded: 1993
- Abolished: 1998
- Location: Košice, Slovakia
- Surface: Clay (red)

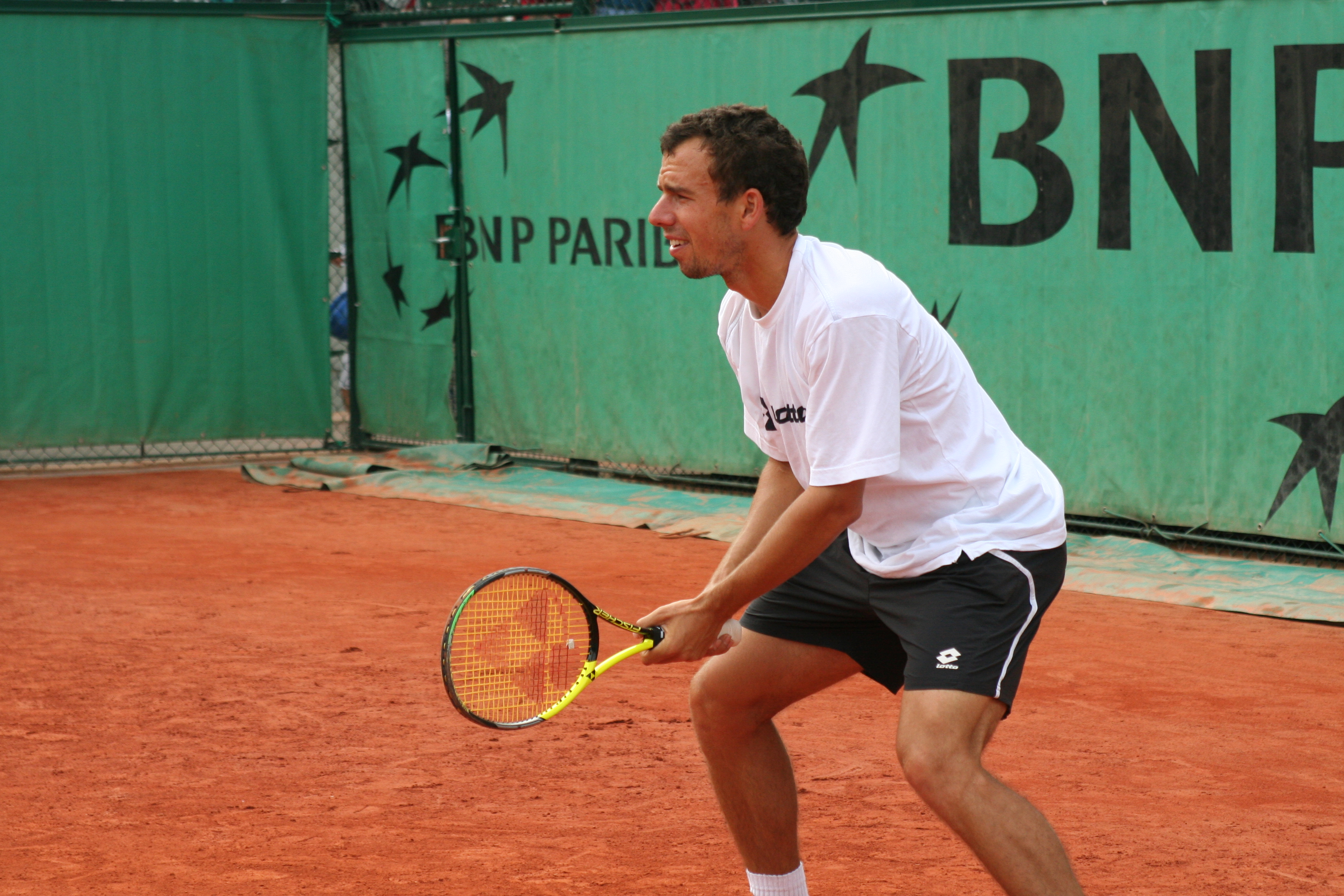
1996 runner-up, Dominik Hrbatý became the first Slovak singles champion in 1997, and won again in 1998

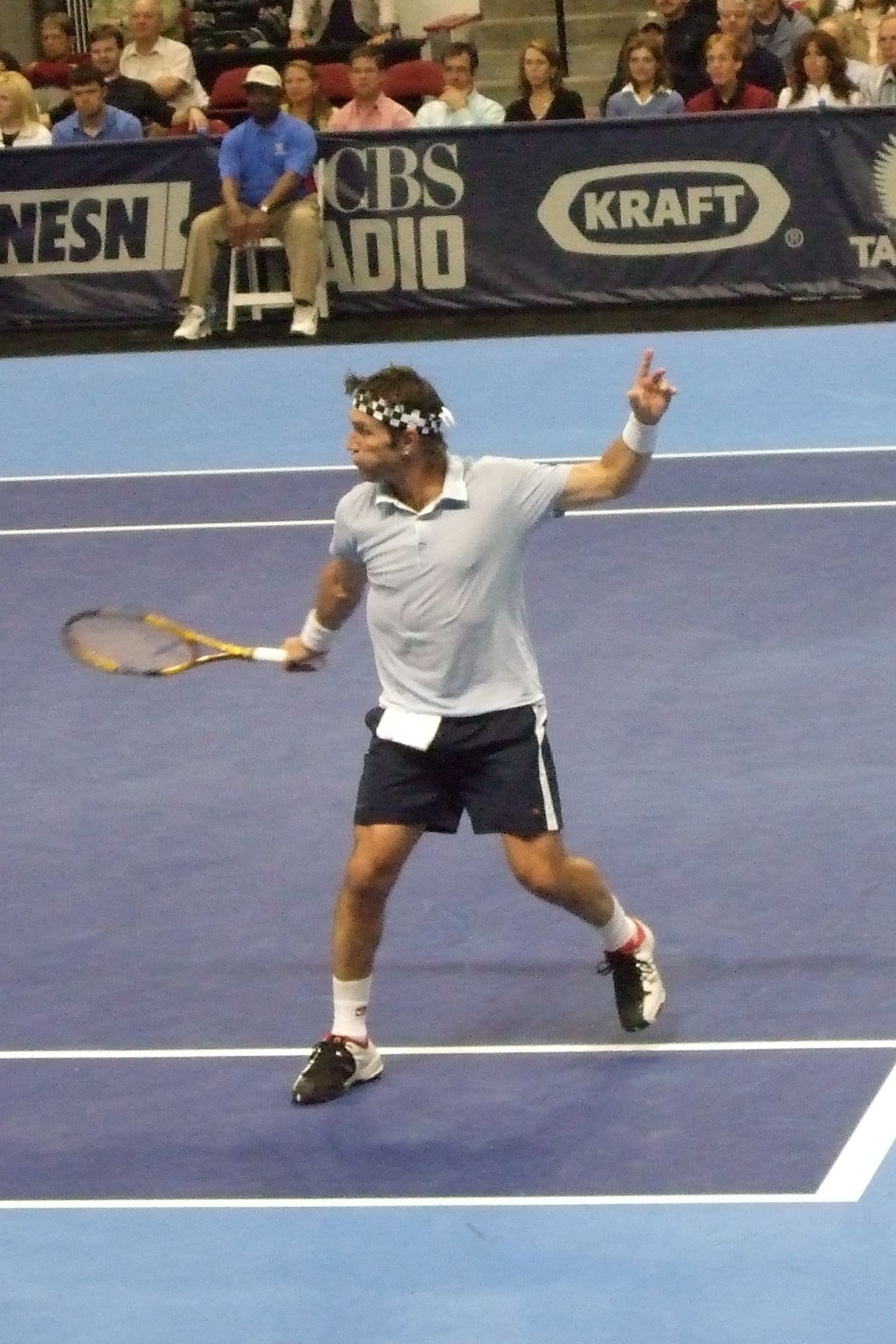
1988 Wimbledon Championships titleist Pat Cash from Australia took the doubles title with Andrew Kratzmann in 1997

The VSZ Slovak Open is a defunct professional tennis tournament played on outdoor red clay courts. It was part of the Association of Tennis Professionals (ATP) Challenger Series. It was held annually in Košice, Slovakia, from 1993 to 1998.

== Past finals ==
=== Singles ===
Year	Champion	Runner-up	Score
1998	(Slovakia) Dominik Hrbatý	(Brazil) Fernando Meligeni	7–5, 6–4
1997	(Slovakia) Dominik Hrbatý	(Ecuador) Nicolás Lapentti	6–4, 6–4
1996	(Spain) Marcos Aurelio Gorriz	(Slovakia) Dominik Hrbatý	6–4, 6–3
1995	(Romania) Adrian Voinea	(Spain) Roberto Carretero-Diaz	6–3, 4–6, 6–1
1994	(Austria) Horst Skoff	(Slovenia) Iztok Bozik	6–3, 6–3
1993	(Czech Republic) David Rikl	(Romania) Dinu-Mihai Pescariu	7–6, 5–7, 6–3

=== Doubles ===
Year	Champions	Runners-up	Score
1998	(Czech Republic) Jiří Novák (Czech Republic) David Rikl	(Federal Republic of Yugoslavia) Nebojsa Djordjevic (South Africa) Marcos Ondruska	7–6, 6–4
1997	(Australia) Pat Cash (Australia) Andrew Kratzmann	(South Africa) Brent Haygarth (Belarus) Max Mirnyi	4–6, 6–2, 6–4
1996	(France) Olivier Delaître (United States) Jeff Tarango	(Czech Republic) Jan Kodeš (Czech Republic) Petr Pála	7–6, 6–3
1995	(Czech Republic) Jiří Novák (Czech Republic) David Rikl	(United States) Jeff Tarango (Romania) Adrian Voinea	7–6, 6–2
1994	(United States) Tommy Ho (Sweden) Mikael Tillström	(Portugal) Emanuel Couto (Portugal) Bernardo Mota	7–6, 6–1
1993	(Slovakia) Branislav Stankovic (Slovakia) Marián Vajda	(Spain) Alejo Mancisidor (Spain) Federico Sánchez	6–2, 6–1
