= 1992 Trofeo Villa de Madrid – Doubles =

Doubles
- 1992 Trofeo Villa de Madrid

Final
- Champions: (United States) Patrick Galbraith (United States) Patrick McEnroe
- Runners-up: (Spain) Francisco Clavet (Spain) Carlos Costa
- Score: 6–3, 6–2

Details
- Draw: 16 (1Q)
- Seeds: 4

Events
Singles	Doubles
- Madrid Tennis Grand Prix

Gustavo Luza and Cássio Motta were the defending champions, but Luza did not compete this year. Motta teamed up with Jorge Lozano and lost in the first round to Christian Miniussi and Diego Pérez

Patrick Galbraith and Patrick McEnroe won the title by defeating Francisco Clavet and Carlos Costa 6–3, 6–2 in the final.

== Seeds ==
1. (United States) Luke Jensen / (Australia) Laurie Warder (semifinals)
2. (Netherlands) Tom Nijssen / (Czech Republic) Cyril Suk (quarterfinals)
3. (Spain) Sergio Casal / (Spain) Emilio Sánchez (first round)
4. (United States) Patrick Galbraith / (United States) Patrick McEnroe (champions)

== Draw ==
Key

- Q = Qualifier
- WC = Wild card
- LL = Lucky loser
- Alt = Alternate
- ITF = ITF entry
- PR = Protected ranking
- SR = Special ranking
- SE = Special exempt
- JE = Junior exempt
- JR = Junior Accelerator Programme entrant
- CO = College Accelerator Programme entrant
- NG = Next Gen Accelerator Program entrant
- w/o = Walkover
- r = Retired
- d = Defaulted

=== Draw ===
First round
1	(United States) L Jensen (Australia) L Warder	6	6
(Spain) J Clavet (Spain) D de Miguel	3	1
(Mexico) J Lozano (Brazil) C Motta	4	7	6
(Argentina) C Miniussi (Uruguay) D Pérez	6	5	7
3	(Spain) S Casal (Spain) E Sánchez	2	3
(Spain) S Bruguera (Czechoslovakia) I Lendl	6	6
(Spain) F Clavet (Spain) C Costa	6	6	6
Q	(Argentina) L Lobo (Argentina) G Markus	3	7	3
(Argentina) J Frana (United States) J McEnroe	6	6
(Spain) T Carbonell (Switzerland) M Rosset	3	3
(Italy) D Nargiso (Brazil) J Oncins	4	7	3
4	(United States) P Galbraith (United States) P McEnroe	6	6	6
(Sweden) R Båthman (Sweden) R Bergh	6	6
(Czechoslovakia) V Flégl (United States) S Melville	2	3
(Ecuador) A Gómez (Spain) J Sánchez	3	6	4
2	(Netherlands) T Nijssen (Czech Republic) C Suk	6	4	6

Quarterfinals
1	(United States) L Jensen (Australia) L Warder	6	6	6
(Argentina) C Miniussi (Uruguay) D Pérez	7	4	4
(Spain) S Bruguera (Czechoslovakia) I Lendl
(Spain) F Clavet (Spain) C Costa	w/o
(Argentina) J Frana (United States) J McEnroe	6	6	6
4	(United States) P Galbraith (United States) P McEnroe	7	4	7
(Sweden) R Båthman (Sweden) R Bergh	6	4	7
2	(Netherlands) T Nijssen (Czech Republic) C Suk	4	6	6

Semifinals
1	(United States) L Jensen (Australia) L Warder	6	6	1
(Spain) F Clavet (Spain) C Costa	7	2	6
4	(United States) P Galbraith (United States) P McEnroe	2	6	6
(Sweden) R Båthman (Sweden) R Bergh	6	0	2

Final
(Spain) F Clavet (Spain) C Costa	3	2
4	(United States) P Galbraith (United States) P McEnroe	6	6
