= 1994 Swedish Open – Doubles =

Doubles
- 1994 Swedish Open

Final
- Champions: (Sweden) Jan Apell (Sweden) Jonas Björkman
- Runners-up: (Sweden) Nicklas Kulti (Sweden) Mikael Tillström
- Score: 6–2, 6–3

Details
- Draw: 16 (3WC/1Q)
- Seeds: 4

Events
Singles	Doubles
← 1993 ·	Swedish Open	· 1995 →

Henrik Holm and Anders Järryd were the defending champions, but lost in the semifinals to Nicklas Kulti and Mikael Tillström.

Jan Apell and Jonas Björkman won the title by defeating Kulti and Tillström 6–2, 6–3 in the final.

== Seeds ==
1. (Sweden) Jan Apell / (Sweden) Jonas Björkman (champions)
2. (Sweden) Henrik Holm / (Sweden) Anders Järryd (semifinals)
3. (Spain) Tomás Carbonell / (United States) Donald Johnson (semifinals)
4. (Sweden) Nicklas Kulti / (Sweden) Mikael Tillström (final)

== Draw ==
=== Key ===
- Q = Qualifier
- WC = Wild card
- LL = Lucky loser
- Alt = Alternate
- ITF = ITF entry
- PR = Protected ranking
- SR = Special ranking
- SE = Special exempt
- JE = Junior exempt
- JR = Junior Accelerator Programme entrant
- CO = College Accelerator Programme entrant
- NG = Next Gen Accelerator Program entrant
- w/o = Walkover
- r = Retired
- d = Defaulted

=== Draw ===
First round
1	(Sweden) J Apell (Sweden) J Björkman	6	6
WC	(Germany) H Dreekmann (Sweden) J Gunnarsson	1	0
(Sweden) N Utgren (Sweden) LA Wahlgren	1	4
(Argentina) L Arnold Ker (Argentina) H de la Peña	6	6
3	(Spain) T Carbonell (United States) D Johnson	6	6
WC	(Sweden) R Båthman (Sweden) R Bergh	3	4
WC	(Sweden) T Enqvist (Sweden) P Lundgren	6	6	7
Q	(Australia) R Fromberg (United States) T Mercer	7	4	6
(South Africa) R Deppe (Argentina) D Orsanic	6	1	2
(Germany) M Huning (Malaysia) A Malik	4	6	6
(South Africa) K Haygarth (Australia) J Ireland	4	3
4	(Sweden) N Kulti (Sweden) M Tillström	6	6
(Australia) P Kilderry (Netherlands) S Noteboom	4	6	5
(Sweden) T Nydahl (Norway) BO Pedersen	6	1	7
(United Kingdom) N Broad (United States) J Waite	6	3
2	(Sweden) H Holm (Sweden) A Järryd	7	6

Quarterfinals
1	(Sweden) J Apell (Sweden) J Björkman	6	6
(Argentina) L Arnold Ker (Argentina) H de la Peña	1	4
3	(Spain) T Carbonell (United States) D Johnson	6	6	6
WC	(Sweden) T Enqvist (Sweden) P Lundgren	7	3	4
(Germany) M Huning (Malaysia) A Malik	7	6	4
4	(Sweden) N Kulti (Sweden) M Tillström	6	7	6
(Sweden) T Nydahl (Norway) BO Pedersen	3	3
2	(Sweden) H Holm (Sweden) A Järryd	6	6

Semifinals
1	(Sweden) J Apell (Sweden) J Björkman	7	6
3	(Spain) T Carbonell (United States) D Johnson	5	2
4	(Sweden) N Kulti (Sweden) M Tillström	6	6
2	(Sweden) H Holm (Sweden) A Järryd	4	3

Final
1	(Sweden) J Apell (Sweden) J Björkman	6	6
4	(Sweden) N Kulti (Sweden) M Tillström	2	3
