= 1994 Swedish Open – Singles =

Singles
- 1994 Swedish Open

Final
- Champion: (Germany) Bernd Karbacher
- Runner-up: (Austria) Horst Skoff
- Score: 6–4, 6–3

Details
- Draw: 32 (3WC/4Q)
- Seeds: 8

Events
Singles	Doubles
- Swedish Open

Horst Skoff was the defending champion, but lost in the final to Bernd Karbacher. The score was 6–4, 6–3.

== Seeds ==
1. (n/a)
2. (Russia) Andrei Chesnokov (quarterfinals)
3. (Sweden) Henrik Holm (first round)
4. (Spain) Tomás Carbonell (quarterfinals)
5. (Sweden) Thomas Enqvist (first round)
6. (Sweden) Mikael Pernfors (first round)
7. (Austria) Horst Skoff (final)
8. (Australia) Richard Fromberg (semifinals)

== Draw ==
Key

- Q = Qualifier
- WC = Wild card
- LL = Lucky loser
- Alt = Alternate
- ITF = ITF entry
- PR = Protected ranking
- SR = Special ranking
- SE = Special exempt
- JE = Junior exempt
- JR = Junior Accelerator Programme entrant
- CO = College Accelerator Programme entrant
- NG = Next Gen Accelerator Program entrant
- w/o = Walkover
- r = Retired
- d = Defaulted

=== Finals ===
Semifinals
8	(Australia) Richard Fromberg	2	6	6^{5}
(Germany) Bernd Karbacher	6	3	7^{7}
(France) Jean-Philippe Fleurian	6	4	5
7	(Austria) Horst Skoff	1	6	7

Final
(Germany) Bernd Karbacher	6	6
7	(Austria) Horst Skoff	4	3

=== Top half ===
First round
LL	(Sweden) N Utgren	6^{3}	3
(Sweden) J Apell	7^{7}	6
(Sweden) J Björkman	6	6
(France) G Solvès	0	4
WC	(Sweden) A Järryd	6	1	7^{8}
WC	(Sweden) T Johansson	2	6	6^{6}
(Ukraine) D Poliakov	3	6	6^{4}
8	(Australia) R Fromberg	6	4	7^{7}
3	(Sweden) H Holm	6	1	5
(Germany) B Karbacher	4	6	7
(Belgium) X Daufresne	3	4
(France) R Gilbert	6	6
(Sweden) C Bergström	2	6	5
WC	(Sweden) M Tillström	6	2	7
Q	(Argentina) D Orsanic	6	6
5	(Sweden) T Enqvist	2	1

Second round
(Sweden) J Apell	7^{7}	4	6
(Sweden) J Björkman	6^{5}	6	2
WC	(Sweden) A Järryd	1	4
8	(Australia) R Fromberg	6	6
(Germany) B Karbacher	7^{7}	6
(France) R Gilbert	6^{4}	3
WC	(Sweden) M Tillström	3	6	5
Q	(Argentina) D Orsanic	6	1	7

Quarterfinals
(Sweden) J Apell	6	4	4
8	(Australia) R Fromberg	3	6	6
(Germany) B Karbacher	6	6
Q	(Argentina) D Orsanic	3	4

Semifinals
8	(Australia) R Fromberg	2	6	6^{5}
(Germany) B Karbacher	6	3	7^{7}

=== Bottom half ===
First round
6	(Sweden) M Pernfors	6	3	2
(Sweden) T Nydahl	1	6	6
(Germany) H Dreekmann	2	2
(France) JP Fleurian	6	6
(Morocco) K Alami	6^{4}	5
Q	(United States) D Johnson	7^{7}	7
(Argentina) H de la Peña	1	1
4	(Spain) T Carbonell	6	6
7	(Austria) H Skoff	6	6
(Spain) A Costa	2	4
(Sweden) N Kulti	7^{7}	3	6
(Spain) F Clavet	6^{3}	6	4
(Sweden) L Jönsson	2	6	6
Q	(Sweden) P Lundgren	6	3	1
Q	(Sweden) O Kristiansson	3	6	2
2	(Russia) A Chesnokov	6	4	6

Second round
(Sweden) T Nydahl	2	3
(France) JP Fleurian	6	6
Q	(United States) D Johnson	6	2	3
4	(Spain) T Carbonell	4	6	6
7	(Austria) H Skoff	6	6
(Sweden) N Kulti	4	4
(Sweden) L Jönsson	1	5
2	(Russia) A Chesnokov	6	7

Quarterfinals
(France) JP Fleurian	6	6
4	(Spain) T Carbonell	2	4
7	(Austria) H Skoff	6	1	6
2	(Russia) A Chesnokov	4	6	4

Semifinals
(France) JP Fleurian	6	4	5
7	(Austria) H Skoff	1	6	7
