= 1988 Madrid Tennis Grand Prix =

- Date: 11–17 April
- Edition: 17th
- Category: Grand Prix
- Draw: 32S / 16D
- Prize money: $93,400
- Surface: Clay / outdoor
- Location: Madrid, Spain
- Venue: Club de Campo Villa de Madrid

Champions

Singles
- (Sweden) Kent Carlsson

Doubles
- (Spain) Sergio Casal / (Spain) Emilio Sánchez
← 1987 ·	Madrid Tennis Grand Prix	· 1989 →

The 1988 Madrid Tennis Grand Prix, also known by its sponsored name Nabisco Grand Prix de la Villa de Madrid, was a men's tennis tournament played on outdoor clay courts at the Club de Campo Villa de Madrid in Madrid, Spain that was part of the 1988 Nabisco Grand Prix circuit. It was the 17th edition of the tournament and was played from 11 April until 17 April 1988. First-seeded Kent Carlsson won the singles title.

== Finals ==
=== Singles ===
(Sweden) Kent Carlsson defeated (Spain) Fernando Luna 6–2, 6–1

- It was Carlsson's 1st singles title and the 5th of his career.

=== Doubles ===
(Spain) Sergio Casal / (Spain) Emilio Sánchez defeated (Australia) Jason Stoltenberg / (Australia) Todd Woodbridge 6–7^{(7–9)}, 7–6^{(7–5)}, 6–3

- It was Casal's 1st doubles title of the year and the 16th of his career. It was Sánchez' 1st doubles title of the year and the 15th of his career.
