= 1994 Swedish Open =

- Date: 4–11 July
- Edition: 47th
- Category: World Series
- Draw: 32S / 16D
- Prize money: $288,750
- Surface: Clay / outdoor
- Location: Båstad, Sweden

Champions

Singles
- (Germany) Bernd Karbacher

Doubles
- (Sweden) Jan Apell / (Sweden) Jonas Björkman
- Swedish Open

The 1994 Swedish Open was a men's tennis tournament played on outdoor clay courts in Båstad, Sweden that was part of the World Series of the 1994 ATP Tour. It was the 47th edition of the tournament and was held from 4 July until 11 July 1994. Unseeded Bernd Karbacher won the singles title.

== Finals ==
=== Singles ===
(Germany) Bernd Karbacher defeated (Austria) Horst Skoff, 6–4, 6–3

- It was Karbacher's 1st singles title of the year and the 2nd of his career.

=== Doubles ===
(Sweden) Jan Apell / (Sweden) Jonas Björkman defeated (Sweden) Nicklas Kulti / (Sweden) Mikael Tillström, 6–2, 6–3
