= 1991 Trofeo Villa de Madrid =

- Date: 29 April – 5 May
- Edition: 20th
- Category: World Series
- Draw: 32S / 16D
- Prize money: $450,000
- Surface: Clay / outdoor
- Location: Madrid, Spain
- Venue: Club de Tenis Chamartín

Champions

Singles
- (Spain) Jordi Arrese

Doubles
- (Argentina) Gustavo Luza / (Brazil) Cássio Motta
- Madrid Tennis Grand Prix

The 1991 Trofeo Villa de Madrid, also known by its sponsored name Trofeo Grupo Zeta Villa de Madrid, was a men's tennis tournament played on outdoor clay courts at the Club de Tenis Chamartín in Madrid, Spain that was part of the World Series of the 1991 ATP Tour. It was the 20th edition of the tournament and was played from 29 April until 5 May 1991. Seventh-seeded Jordi Arrese won the singles title.

== Finals ==
=== Singles ===
(Spain) Jordi Arrese defeated (Uruguay) Marcelo Filippini 6–2, 6–4

- It was Arrese's 1st singles title and the 3rd of his career.

=== Doubles ===
(Argentina) Gustavo Luza / (Brazil) Cássio Motta defeated (Brazil) Luiz Mattar / (Brazil) Jaime Oncins 6–0, 7–5

- It was Luza's only doubles title of the year and the 4th of his career. It was Motta's only doubles title of the year and 10th and last of his career.
