= 1992 Swedish Open =

- Date: 6–12 July
- Edition: 45th
- Category: World Series
- Draw: 32S / 16D
- Prize money: $235,000
- Surface: Clay / outdoor
- Location: Båstad, Sweden

Champions

Singles
- (Sweden) Magnus Gustafsson

Doubles
- (Spain) Tomás Carbonell / (Argentina) Christian Miniussi
- Swedish Open

The 1992 Swedish Open was a men's tennis tournament played on outdoor clay courts in Båstad, Sweden that was part of the World Series of the 1992 ATP Tour. It was the 45th edition of the tournament and was held from 6 July until 12 July 1992. Second-seeded Magnus Gustafsson won his second consecutive singles title at the event.

== Finals ==
=== Singles ===
(Sweden) Magnus Gustafsson defeated (Spain) Tomás Carbonell, 5–7, 7–5, 6–4

- It was Gustafsson's 1st singles title of the year and the 4th of his career.

=== Doubles ===
(Spain) Tomás Carbonell / (Argentina) Christian Miniussi defeated (Sweden) Christian Bergström / (Sweden) Magnus Gustafsson, 6–4, 7–5
