= 1990 Campionati Internazionali di San Marino =

- Date: 20–26 August
- Edition: 2nd
- Category: World Series
- Draw: 32S / 16D
- Prize money: $125,000
- Surface: Clay / outdoor
- Location: Serravalle, San Marino
- Venue: Centro Sportivo Serravalle

Champions

Singles
- (Argentina) Guillermo Pérez Roldán

Doubles
- (Czechoslovakia) Vojtěch Flégl / (Czechoslovakia) Daniel Vacek
← 1989 ·	Campionati Internazionali di San Marino	· 1991 →

The 1990 Campionati Internazionali di San Marino was a men's tennis tournament played on outdoor clay courts at Centro Sportivo Serravalle in San Marino and was part of the World Series of the 1990 ATP Tour. It was the third edition of the tournament and the second as an ATP Tour event, and was held from 20 August until 26 August 1990. First-seeded Guillermo Pérez Roldán won the singles title.

== Finals ==
=== Singles ===
(Argentina) Guillermo Pérez Roldán defeated (Italy) Omar Camporese 6–3, 6–3

- It was Pérez Roldán's 1st title of the year and the 6th of his career.

=== Doubles ===
(Czechoslovakia) Vojtěch Flégl / (Czechoslovakia) Daniel Vacek defeated (Spain) Jordi Burillo / (Spain) Marcos Górriz 6–1, 4–6, 7–6
