= Magnus Gustafsson =

Swedish tennis player

- Country (sports): Sweden
- Residence: Gothenburg, Sweden
- Born: 3 January 1967 (age 59) Lund, Sweden
- Height: 1.85 m (6 ft 1 in)
- Turned pro: 1986
- Retired: 2002
- Plays: Right-handed (two-handed backhand)
- Prize money: $4,545,489

Singles
- Career record: 415–260
- Career titles: 14
- Highest ranking: No. 10 (29 July 1991)

Grand Slam singles results
- Australian Open: QF (1994)
- French Open: 4R (1988, 1990)
- Wimbledon: 4R (1996)
- US Open: 2R (1996, 1997)

Other tournaments
- Olympic Games: 2R (1992, 1996)

Doubles
- Career record: 58–69
- Career titles: 1
- Highest ranking: No. 77 (6 November 1989)

Grand Slam doubles results
- Australian Open: 2R (1988)
- French Open: 1R (1988, 1989)
- Wimbledon: 1R (1988, 1989)
- US Open: 1R (1989)

Mixed doubles
- Career record: 0–2
- Career titles: 0

Grand Slam mixed doubles results
- French Open: 1R (1988, 1989)

Team competitions
- Davis Cup: W (1998)

Magnus Nils Gustafsson (born 3 January 1967) is a tennis coach and former top ten professional tennis player from Sweden. Gustafsson won 14 tour singles titles during his career and finished 15 consecutive seasons within the world's top 100, reaching a career-high singles ranking of world No. 10 in 1991. He was instrumental in Sweden capturing the Davis Cup in 1998, winning both his singles rubbers in the final in straight sets. His best performance at a Grand Slam event came at the Australian Open in 1994, where he reached the quarterfinals. During his career, he beat several top five players including Ivan Lendl, Michael Stich, Goran Ivanisevic, Andre Agassi and Michael Chang.

== Career finals ==
=== Singles: 26 (14–12) ===
Legend Grand Slam tournaments (0–0) ATP Masters Series (0–1) ATP Championship Series (2–1) ATP Tour (12–10)	Finals by surface Hard (2–2) Grass (0–0) Clay (8–8) Carpet (4–2)

Result	W/L	Date	Tournament	Surface	Opponent	Score
Loss	0–1	Jul 1989	Gstaad, Switzerland	Clay	(Germany) Carl-Uwe Steeb	7–6^{(8–6)}, 6–3, 2–6, 4–6, 2–6
Loss	0–2	Nov 1989	Stockholm, Sweden	Carpet (i)	(Czechoslovakia) Ivan Lendl	5–7, 0–6, 3–6
Win	1–2	May 1991	Munich, Germany	Clay	(Argentina) Guillermo Pérez Roldán	3–6, 6–3, 4–3 ret.
Loss	1–3	May 1991	Hamburg, Germany	Clay	(Czechoslovakia) Karel Nováček	3–6, 3–6, 7–5, 6–0, 1–6
Win	2–3	Jul 1991	Båstad, Sweden	Clay	(Argentina) Alberto Mancini	6–1, 6–2
Win	3–3	Jul 1991	Hilversum, Netherlands	Clay	(Spain) Jordi Arrese	5–7, 7–6^{(7–2)}, 2–6, 6–1, 6–0
Loss	3–4	Aug 1991	Kitzbühel, Austria	Clay	(Czechoslovakia) Karel Nováček	6–7^{(2–7)}, 6–7^{(4–7)}, 2–6
Loss	3–5	Aug 1991	Prague, Czechoslovakia	Clay	(Czechoslovakia) Karel Nováček	6–7^{(5–7)}, 2–6
Loss	3–6	Apr 1992	Barcelona, Spain	Clay	(Spain) Carlos Costa	4–6, 6–7^{(3–7)}, 4–6
Win	4–6	Jul 1992	Båstad, Sweden	Clay	(Spain) Tomás Carbonell	5–7, 7–5, 6–4
Loss	4–7	Jun 1993	Genoa, Italy	Clay	(Austria) Thomas Muster	6–7^{(3–7)}, 4–6
Win	5–7	Jul 1993	Stuttgart, Germany	Clay	(Germany) Michael Stich	6–3, 6–4, 3–6, 4–6, 6–4
Loss	5–8	Aug 1993	Hilversum, Netherlands	Clay	(Spain) Carlos Costa	1–6, 2–6, 3–6
Loss	5–9	Nov 1993	Antwerp, Belgium	Carpet (i)	(United States) Pete Sampras	1–6, 4–6
Win	6–9	Jan 1994	Auckland, New Zealand	Hard	(United States) Patrick McEnroe	6–4, 6–0
Win	7–9	Feb 1994	Dubai, UAE	Hard	(Spain) Sergi Bruguera	6–4, 6–2
Win	8–9	Apr 1996	St. Petersburg, Russia	Carpet (i)	(Russia) Yevgeny Kafelnikov	6–2, 7–6^{(7–4)}
Win	9–9	Jul 1996	Båstad, Sweden	Clay	(Ukraine) Andrei Medvedev	6–1, 6–3
Loss	9–10	Aug 1997	San Marino, San Marino	Clay	(Spain) Félix Mantilla	4–6, 1–6
Loss	9–11	Oct 1997	Beijing, China	Hard (i)	(United States) Jim Courier	6–7^{(10–12)}, 6–3, 3–6
Win	10–11	Oct 1997	Singapore, Singapore	Carpet (i)	(Germany) Nicolas Kiefer	4–6, 6–3, 6–3
Win	11–11	Mar 1998	Copenhagen, Denmark	Carpet (i)	(Germany) David Prinosil	3–6, 6–1, 6–1
Win	12–11	Jul 1998	Båstad, Sweden	Clay	(Ukraine) Andrei Medvedev	6–2, 6–3
Win	13–11	Mar 1999	Copenhagen, Denmark	Carpet (i)	(France) Fabrice Santoro	6–4, 6–1
Loss	13–12	Nov 1999	Stockholm, Sweden	Hard (i)	(Sweden) Thomas Enqvist	3–6, 4–6, 2–6
Win	14–12	Jul 2000	Amsterdam, Netherlands	Clay	(Netherlands) Raemon Sluiter	6–7^{(4–7)}, 6–3, 7–6^{(7–5)}, 6–1

=== Doubles: 8 (1–7) ===
Result	W/L	Date	Tournament	Surface	Partner	Opponents	Score
Loss	0–1	Feb 1988	Rotterdam, Netherlands	Carpet	(Italy) Diego Nargiso	(West Germany) Patrik Kühnen (West Germany) Tore Meinecke	6–7, 6–7
Loss	0–2	Jul 1988	Hilversum, Netherlands	Clay	(Argentina) Guillermo Pérez Roldán	(Spain) Sergio Casal (Spain) Emilio Sánchez	6–7, 3–6
Loss	0–3	Feb 1989	Rotterdam, Netherlands	Carpet	(Sweden) Jan Gunnarsson	(Czechoslovakia) Miloslav Mečíř (Czechoslovakia) Milan Šrejber	6–7, 0–6
Loss	0–4	Jul 1991	Båstad, Sweden	Clay	(Sweden) Anders Järryd	(Sweden) Ronnie Båthman (Sweden) Rikard Bergh	4–6, 4–6
Loss	0–5	Jul 1991	Hilversum, Netherlands	Clay	(Spain) Francisco Clavet	(Netherlands) Richard Krajicek (Netherlands) Jan Siemerink	5–7, 4–6
Loss	0–6	Jul 1992	Båstad, Sweden	Clay	(Sweden) Christian Bergström	(Spain) Tomas Carbonell (Argentina) Christian Miniussi	4–6, 5–7
Loss	0–7	Jul 1997	Båstad, Sweden	Clay	(Sweden) Magnus Larsson	(Sweden) Nicklas Kulti (Sweden) Mikael Tillström	0–6, 3–6
Win	1–7	Jul 1998	Båstad, Sweden	Clay	(Sweden) Magnus Larsson	(South Africa) Lan Bale (South Africa) Piet Norval	6–4, 6–2

== Singles performance timeline ==
Key
W	F	SF	QF	#R	RR	Q#	DNQ	A	NH

(W) winner; (F) finalist; (SF) semifinalist; (QF) quarterfinalist; (#R) rounds 4, 3, 2, 1; (RR) round-robin stage; (Q#) qualification round; (DNQ) did not qualify; (A) absent; (NH) not held; (SR) strike rate (events won / competed); (W–L) win–loss record.

Tournament	1985	1986	1987	1988	1989	1990	1991	1992	1993	1994	1995	1996	1997	1998	1999	2000	2001	Career SR	Career W-L
Grand Slam tournaments
Australian Open	A	NH	A	3R	4R	2R	3R	2R	1R	QF	A	A	2R	3R	A	A	A	0 / 9	16–9
French Open	A	A	A	4R	1R	4R	3R	2R	1R	2R	2R	1R	2R	3R	1R	1R	1R	0 / 14	14–14
Wimbledon	A	A	A	2R	1R	A	2R	A	1R	A	A	4R	2R	3R	1R	3R	1R	0 / 10	10–10
US Open	A	A	A	A	1R	A	A	1R	1R	A	A	2R	2R	1R	1R	1R	1R	0 / 9	2–9
Grand Slam SR	0 / 0	0 / 0	0 / 0	0 / 3	0 / 4	0 / 2	0 / 3	0 / 3	0 / 4	0 / 2	0 / 1	0 / 3	0 / 4	0 / 4	0 / 3	0 / 3	0 / 3	0 / 42	N/A
Annual win–loss	0–0	0–0	0–0	6–3	3–4	4–2	5–3	2–3	0–4	5–2	1–1	4–3	4–4	6–4	0–3	2–3	0–3	N/A	42–42
ATP Masters Series
Indian Wells	Not MS1 Before 1990					A	A	3R	A	A	A	A	A	A	A	A	A	0 / 1	2–1
Key Biscayne	Not MS1 Before 1990					A	3R	2R	A	A	A	A	A	A	A	A	A	0 / 2	1–2
Monte Carlo	Not MS1 Before 1990					1R	QF	2R	2R	3R	A	QF	1R	2R	A	Q2	3R	0 / 9	12–9
Rome	Not MS1 Before 1990					3R	2R	A	2R	A	A	A	1R	A	A	A	A	0 / 4	4–4
Hamburg	Not MS1 Before 1990					QF	F	A	QF	QF	A	A	2R	2R	A	Q1	1R	0 / 7	15–7
Canada	Not MS1 Before 1990					A	A	A	A	A	A	1R	A	A	A	A	A	0 / 1	0–1
Cincinnati	Not MS1 Before 1990					A	A	A	A	A	A	A	A	A	A	A	A	0 / 0	0–0
Stuttgart (Stockholm)	Not MS1 Before 1990					3R	A	3R	3R	A	2R	QF	2R	2R	A	A	A	0 / 7	11–7
Paris	Not MS1 Before 1990					2R	A	A	3R	A	1R	SF	3R	QF	A	2R	A	0 / 7	13–7
Masters Series SR	N/A					0 / 5	0 / 4	0 / 4	0 / 5	0 / 2	0 / 2	0 / 4	0 / 5	0 / 4	0 / 0	0 / 1	0 / 2	0 / 38	N/A
Annual win–loss	N/A					8–5	10–4	4–4	8–5	4–2	1–2	10–4	4–5	6–4	0–0	1–1	2–2	N/A	58–38
Year-end ranking	794	273	53	51	34	31	12	47	14	33	84	17	37	32	61	82	82	N/A	
