= 1990 Madrid Grand Prix =

1990 Madrid Tennis Grand Prix
- Date: 30 April – 6 May
- Edition: 19th
- Category: World Series
- Draw: 32S / 16D
- Prize money: $279,000
- Surface: Clay / outdoor
- Location: Madrid, Spain
- Venue: Club de Campo Villa de Madrid

Champions

Singles
- (Ecuador) Andrés Gómez

Doubles
- (Spain) Juan Carlos Báguena / (Italy) Omar Camporese
- Madrid Tennis Grand Prix

The 1990 Madrid Grand Prix was a men's tennis tournament played on outdoor clay courts at the Club de Campo Villa de Madrid in Madrid, Spain that was part of the World Series of the 1990 ATP Tour. It was the 19th edition of the tournament and was played from 30 April until 6 May 1990. Second-seeded Andrés Gómez won the singles title.

== Finals ==
=== Singles ===
(Ecuador) Andrés Gómez defeated (Switzerland) Marc Rosset 6–3, 7–6^{(7–3)}

- It was Gómez' 2nd singles title and the 19th of his career.

=== Doubles ===
(Spain) Juan Carlos Báguena / (Italy) Omar Camporese defeated (Ecuador) Andrés Gómez / (Spain) Javier Sánchez 6–3, 3–6, 7–6

- It was Báguena's only doubles title of his career. It was Camporese's 2nd doubles title of the year and of his career.
