= Germán López (tennis) =

Spanish tennis player (born 1971)

- Country (sports): Spain
- Born: December 29, 1971 (age 53); Barcelona, Spain
- Height: 1.93 m (6 ft 4 in)
- Turned pro: 1990
- Plays: Right-handed
- Prize money: $298,869

Singles
- Career record: 32-44
- Career titles: 0
- Highest ranking: No. 61 (23 Mar 1992)

Grand Slam singles results
- French Open: 2R (1992)
- Wimbledon: 1R (1992)
- US Open: 1R (1992)

Doubles
- Career record: 2-10

Germán López Montoya (born 29 December 1971) is a former professional tennis player from Spain.

== Career ==
Lopez was runner-up in the 18 and Under category of the 1989 Orange Bowl, losing the final to Fernando Meligeni.

The Spaniard made his first Grand Slam appearance in the 1991 French Open and in the opening round lost to Cristiano Caratti, despite winning the first two sets. He played in three further Grand Slam tournaments during his career, all in 1992. Only once did he make the second round, in the 1992 French Open, where he defeated Tomás Carbonell.

He reached the quarter-finals at Madrid, Stuttgart and Guarujá in 1991. His victory over world number 10 Emilio Sánchez in Stuttgart was the biggest win of his career. The following year he made the final of the Grand Prix Hassan II event in Casablanca, after a comprehensive semi-final win over Bart Wuyts when he didn't drop a single game. He won the first set of the final against Guillermo Pérez Roldán but was unable to win the title. Also in 1992, Lopez was a semi-finalist in San Marino and Bordeaux.

As a doubles player he won one Challenger tournament and reached a highest ranking of 210.

== ATP career finals ==
=== Singles: 1 (0–1) ===
Result	W/L	Date	Tournament	Surface	Opponent	Score
Loss	0–1	Mar 1992	Casablanca, Morocco	Clay	(Argentina) Guillermo Pérez Roldán	6–2, 5–7, 3–6

== Challenger titles ==
=== Doubles: (1) ===
No.	Year	Tournament	Surface	Partner	Opponents	Score
1.	1990	Messina, Italy	Clay	(Spain) Francisco Roig	(Spain) Carlos Costa (Peru) Pablo Arraya	6–3, 6–2

== Top 10 wins ==
#	Player	Rank	Event	Surface	Round	Score	López Rank
1991
1.	(Spain) Emilio Sánchez	10	Stuttgart, Germany	Clay	2R	7–6^{(7–4)}, 7–6^{(13–11)}	126
