= Madrid Tennis Grand Prix =

Defunct tennis tournament
- Event name: Madrid Tennis Grand Prix
- Tour: Grand Prix circuit (1972–89); ATP Tour (1990–94)
- Founded: 1973
- Abolished: 1994
- Editions: 23
- Location: Madrid, Spain
- Surface: Clay; Carpet (1984)

The Madrid Tennis Grand Prix is a defunct professional men's tennis tournament that was played on outdoor clay courts in Madrid, Spain with the exception of the 1984 edition which was played on indoor carpet courts. It was part of the Grand Prix tennis circuit initially and later, the ATP World Series of the ATP Tour. The tournament was established in 1973, and was played every year until 1994.

== Past finals ==
=== Singles ===
Included:

Year	Champions	Runners-up	Score
1973	(Netherlands) Tom Okker	(Chile) Jaime Fillol	4–6, 6–3, 6–3, 7–5
1974	(Romania) Ilie Năstase	(Sweden) Björn Borg	6–4, 5–7, 6–2, 4–6, 6–4
1975	(Czechoslovakia) Jan Kodeš	(Italy) Adriano Panatta	5–7, 2–6, 7–6, 6–2, 6–3
1976	(Spain) Manuel Orantes	(United States) Eddie Dibbs	7–6, 6–2, 6–1
1977	(Sweden) Björn Borg	(Chile) Jaime Fillol	6–3, 6–0, 6–7, 7–6
1978	(Spain) José Higueras	(Czechoslovakia) Tomáš Šmíd	6–7, 6–3, 6–3, 6–4
1979	(France) Yannick Noah	(Spain) Manuel Orantes	6–3, 6–7, 6–3, 6–2
1980	(Argentina) José Luis Clerc	(Argentina) Guillermo Vilas	6–3, 1–6, 1–6, 6–4, 6–2
1981	(Czechoslovakia) Ivan Lendl	(Peru) Pablo Arraya	6–3, 6–2, 6–2
1982	(Argentina) Guillermo Vilas	(Czechoslovakia) Ivan Lendl	6–7, 4–6, 6–0, 6–3, 6–3
1983	(France) Yannick Noah	(Sweden) Henrik Sundström	3–6, 6–0, 6–2, 6–4
1984	(United States) John McEnroe	(Czechoslovakia) Tomáš Šmíd	6–0, 6–4
1985	(Germany) Andreas Maurer	(United States) Lawson Duncan	7–5, 6–2
1986	(Sweden) Joakim Nyström	(Sweden) Kent Carlsson	6–1, 6–1
1987	(Spain) Emilio Sánchez	(Spain) Javier Sánchez	6–3, 3–6, 6–2
1988	(Sweden) Kent Carlsson	(Spain) Fernando Luna	6–2, 6–1
1989	(Argentina) Martín Jaite	(Spain) Jordi Arrese	6–3, 6–2
1990	(Ecuador) Andrés Gómez	(Switzerland) Marc Rosset	6–3, 7–6
1991	(Spain) Jordi Arrese	(Uruguay) Marcelo Filippini	6–2, 6–4
1992	(Spain) Sergi Bruguera	(Spain) Carlos Costa	7–6, 6–2, 6–2
1993	(Sweden) Stefan Edberg	(Spain) Sergi Bruguera	6–3, 6–3, 6–2
1994	(Austria) Thomas Muster	(Spain) Sergi Bruguera	6–2, 3–6, 6–4, 7–5

=== Doubles ===
Year	Champions	Runners-up	Score
1973	(Romania) Ilie Năstase (Netherlands) Tom Okker	(Australia) Bob Carmichael (South Africa) Frew McMillan	6–3, 6–0
1974	(France) Patrice Dominguez (Spain) Antonio Muñoz	(United States) Brian Gottfried (Mexico) Raúl Ramírez	6–1, 6–3
1975	(Czechoslovakia) Jan Kodeš (Romania) Ilie Năstase	(Spain) Juan Gisbert, Sr. (Spain) Manuel Orantes	7–6, 4–6, 9–7
1976	(Poland) Wojciech Fibak (Mexico) Raúl Ramírez	(South Africa) Bob Hewitt (South Africa) Frew McMillan	4–6, 7–5, 6–3
1977	(South Africa) Bob Hewitt (South Africa) Frew McMillan	(Spain) Antonio Muñoz (Spain) Manuel Orantes	6–7, 7–6, 6–3, 6–1
1978	(Poland) Wojciech Fibak (Czechoslovakia) Jan Kodeš	(Czechoslovakia) Pavel Složil (Czechoslovakia) Tomáš Šmíd	6–7, 6–1, 6–2
1979	(Brazil) Carlos Kirmayr (Brazil) Cássio Motta	(United Kingdom) Robin Drysdale (United Kingdom) John Feaver	7–6, 6–4
1980	(Chile) Hans Gildemeister (Ecuador) Andrés Gómez	(Czechoslovakia) Jan Kodeš (Hungary) Balázs Taróczy	3–6, 6–3, 10–8
1981	(Chile) Hans Gildemeister (Ecuador) Andrés Gómez	(Switzerland) Heinz Günthardt (Note: ITF sources wrongly list Markus Günthardt as finalist.) (Czechoslovakia) Tomáš Šmíd	6–2, 3–6, 6–3
1982	(Czechoslovakia) Pavel Složil (Czechoslovakia) Tomáš Šmíd	(Switzerland) Heinz Günthardt (Hungary) Balázs Taróczy	6–1, 3–6, 9–7
1983	(Switzerland) Heinz Günthardt (Czechoslovakia) Pavel Složil	(Switzerland) Markus Günthardt (Hungary) Zoltan Kuharszky	6–3, 6–3
1984	(United States) Peter Fleming (United States) John McEnroe	(United States) Fritz Buehning (United States) Ferdi Taygan	6–3, 6–3
1985	(Brazil) Givaldo Barbosa (Brazil) Ivan Kley	(Spain) Jorge Bardou (Spain) Alberto Tous	7–6^{(8–6)}, 6–4
1986	(Sweden) Anders Järryd (Sweden) Joakim Nyström	(Spain) Jesus Colas-Abad (Spain) David De Miguel-Lapiedra	6–2, 6–2
1987	(Peru) Carlos Di Laura (Spain) Javier Sánchez	(Spain) Sergio Casal (Spain) Emilio Sánchez	6–3, 3–6, 7–6
1988	(Spain) Sergio Casal (Spain) Emilio Sánchez	(Australia) Jason Stoltenberg (Australia) Todd Woodbridge	6–7^{(7–9)}, 7–6^{(7–5)}, 6–3
1989	(Spain) Tomás Carbonell (Spain) Carlos Costa	(Spain) Francisco Clavet (Czechoslovakia) Tomáš Šmíd	7–5, 6–3
1990	(Spain) Juan Carlos Báguena (Italy) Omar Camporese	(Ecuador) Andrés Gómez (Spain) Javier Sánchez	6–4, 3–6, 6–3
1991	(Argentina) Gustavo Luza (Brazil) Cássio Motta	(Brazil) Luiz Mattar (Brazil) Jaime Oncins	6–0, 7–5
1992	(United States) Patrick Galbraith (United States) Patrick McEnroe	(Spain) Francisco Clavet (Spain) Carlos Costa	6–3, 6–2
1993	(Spain) Tomás Carbonell (Spain) Carlos Costa	(United States) Luke Jensen (United States) Scott Melville	7–6, 6–2
1994	(Sweden) Rikard Bergh (Netherlands) Menno Oosting	(France) Jean-Philippe Fleurian (Switzerland) Jakob Hlasek	6–3, 6–4

== See also ==
- Madrid International
- Madrid Masters
- WTA Madrid Open
- List of tennis tournaments
