= Marcos Górriz =

Spanish tennis player and coach

- Country (sports): Spain
- Born: 3 March 1964 (age 61); Barcelona, Spain
- Height: 1.85 m (6 ft 1 in)
- Turned pro: 1989
- Plays: Left-handed
- Prize money: $662,335

Singles
- Career record: 37–78
- Career titles: 0
- Highest ranking: No. 88 (19 October 1992)

Grand Slam singles results
- Australian Open: 1R (1992, 1993, 1997)
- French Open: 2R (1992)
- Wimbledon: 2R (1993)
- US Open: 1R (1992, 1993)

Doubles
- Career record: 31–45
- Career titles: 1
- Highest ranking: No. 73 (22 July 1991)

Grand Slam doubles results
- Australian Open: 1R (1992)
- French Open: 1R (1991)
- Wimbledon: 1R (1991)

Marcos Aurelio Górriz Bonhora (Spanish pronunciation: [ˈmaɾkos ˈɣoriθ]; (Note: In isolation, Górriz is pronounced [ˈɡoriθ].) born 4 March 1964) is a former professional tennis player from Spain. He is now a tennis coach; among his students is Alejandro Falla.

== Career ==
Górriz took part in 13 Grand Slam tournaments during his career. From his 11 singles appearances he made the second round twice. The first time was in the 1992 French Open who he beat world number 29 Omar Camporese, before being eliminated in the next round by Michael Chang in four sets. In the 1993 Wimbledon Championships he also made the second round, with a win over Slava Doseděl. On this occasion he lost in the second round to Todd Martin.

The Spaniard made at least one quarter-final appearance on the ATP Tour every year from 1990 to 1994. His best performance came in the 1991 Kremlin Cup, when he was a semi-finalist.

As a doubles player he had more success, winning a title at Genova in 1991, with Alfonso Mora. He was also runner-up at two tournaments.

== ATP career finals ==
=== Doubles: 3 (1–2) ===
Result	W/L	Year	Tournament	Surface	Partner	Opponents	Score
Loss	0–1	Aug 1990	San Marino	Clay	(Spain) Jordi Burillo	(Czechoslovakia) Vojtěch Flégl (Czechoslovakia) Daniel Vacek	1–6, 6–4, 6–7
Loss	0–2	Nov 1990	Itaparica, Brazil	Hard	(Spain) Tomás Carbonell	(Brazil) Mauro Menezes (Brazil) Fernando Roese	6–7, 5–7
Win	1–2	Jun 1991	Genova, Italy	Clay	(Venezuela) Alfonso Mora	(Italy) Massimo Ardinghi (Italy) Massimo Boscatto	5–7, 7–5, 6–3

== Challenger titles ==
=== Singles: (4) ===
No.	Year	Tournament	Surface	Opponent	Score
1.	1990	Knokke, Belgium	Clay	(Czechoslovakia) Josef Čihák	7–5, 2–6, 6–1
2.	1991	Furth, Germany	Clay	(Ukraine) Dimitri Poliakov	6–2, 3–0 RET
3.	1991	Geneva, Switzerland	Clay	(Romania) Dinu Pescariu	6–3, 6–2
4.	1996	Košice, Slovakia	Clay	(Slovakia) Dominik Hrbatý	6–4, 6–3

=== Doubles: (6) ===
No.	Year	Tournament	Surface	Partner	Opponents	Score
1.	1989	Vilamoura, Portugal	Hard	(Spain) Borja Uribe	(Italy) Simone Colombo (United Kingdom) David Felgate	6–1, 3–6, 7–6
2.	1990	Hossegor, France	Clay	(Argentina) Marcelo Ingaramo	(Argentina) Eduardo Bengoechea (Belgium) Eduardo Masso	7–5, 6–2
3.	1991	Parioli, Italy	Clay	(Russia) Andrei Olhovskiy	(Czechoslovakia) Martin Damm (Czechoslovakia) David Rikl	7–5, 2–6, 6–2
4.	1991	Furth, Germany	Clay	(Venezuela) Maurice Ruah	(Australia) Jamie Morgan (Australia) Sandon Stolle	6–2, 6–4
5.	1991	Tampere, Finland	Clay	(Spain) Tomás Carbonell	(South Africa) David Adams (Russia) Andrei Olhovskiy	6–4, 6–2
6.	1994	Ostend, Belgium	Clay	(Belgium) Libor Pimek	(United States) Jeff Belloli (Germany) Martin Zumpft	7–6, 2–6, 6–4
