= 1991 ATP Tour =

Men's tennis circuit

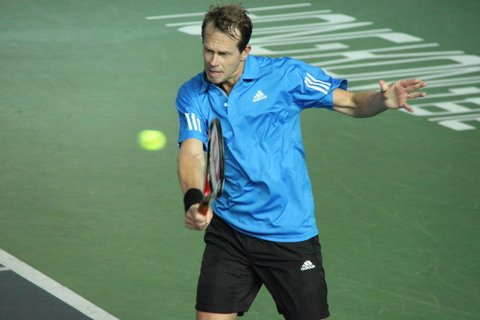
- Stefan Edberg finished the year ranked world No. 1 for the second time in his career. He won six singles titles during the season, including a major at the US Open.

Details
- Duration: 31 December 1990 – 18 November 1991
- Edition: 2nd
- Tournaments: 83
- Categories: Grand Slam (4); ATP Tour World Championships; ATP Championship Series, Single-Week (9); ATP Championship Series (12); ATP World Series (54); Team Events (2)

Achievements (singles)
- Most titles: (Sweden) Stefan Edberg (6) (France) Guy Forget (6)
- Most finals: (Sweden) Stefan Edberg (8) (United States) Pete Sampras (8)
- Prize money leader: (United States) David Wheaton ($2,412,912)
- Points leader: (Sweden) Stefan Edberg (3515)

Awards
- Player of the year: (Sweden) Stefan Edberg
- Doubles team of the year: (Australia) John Fitzgerald (Sweden) Anders Järryd
- Most improved player of the year: (United States) Jim Courier
- Newcomer of the year: (Zimbabwe) Byron Black
- Comeback player of the year: (United States) Jimmy Connors

The 1991 IBM ATP Tour was the elite tour for professional men's tennis organized by the ATP Tour. The IBM ATP Tour included the Grand Slam tournaments (organized by the International Tennis Federation (ITF)), the ATP Championship Series, Single-Week, the ATP Championship Series, the ATP World Series and the ATP Tour World Championships. The World Team Cup, Davis Cup (organized by the ITF) and Grand Slam Cup (organized by the ITF) are included in this calendar but did not count towards the Tour.

== Schedule ==
This is the complete schedule of events on the 1991 IBM ATP Tour, with player progression documented from the quarterfinals stage.

=== Key ===
Grand Slam
ATP Tour World Championships
ATP Championship Series, Single-Week
ATP Championship Series
ATP World Series
Team Events

=== January ===
Week	Tournament	Champions	Runners-up	Semifinalists	Quarterfinalists
31 Dec	Hopman Cup; Perth, Australia; ITF Mixed Team Championships; Hard (i) – 8 teams (RR)	Yugoslavia; 3–0	United States	Switzerland; France	Czechoslovakia; Australia; Soviet Union; Spain
31 Dec	Australian Men's Hardcourt Championships; Adelaide, Australia; ATP World Series; Hard – $150,000 – 32S/16D; Singles – Doubles	(Sweden) Nicklas Kulti; 6–3, 1–6, 6–2	(Germany) Michael Stich	(Sweden) Magnus Larsson (United States) Jim Courier	(Germany) Patrik Kühnen (France) Fabrice Santoro (United States) Jimmy Arias (Germany) Martin Sinner
31 Dec	Australian Men's Hardcourt Championships; Adelaide, Australia; ATP World Series; Hard – $150,000 – 32S/16D; Singles – Doubles	(South Africa) Wayne Ferreira (South Africa) Stefan Kruger; 6–4, 4–6, 6–4	(Netherlands) Paul Haarhuis (Netherlands) Mark Koevermans	(Sweden) Magnus Larsson (United States) Jim Courier	(Germany) Patrik Kühnen (France) Fabrice Santoro (United States) Jimmy Arias (Germany) Martin Sinner
31 Dec	BP National Championships; Wellington, New Zealand; ATP World Series; Hard – $150,000 – 32S/16D	(Australia) Richard Fromberg; 6–1, 6–4, 6–4	(Sweden) Lars Jönsson	(Sweden) Christian Bergström (Italy) Omar Camporese	(Soviet Union) Dimitri Poliakov (India) Ramesh Krishnan (Sweden) Thomas Högstedt (Canada) Andrew Sznajder
31 Dec	BP National Championships; Wellington, New Zealand; ATP World Series; Hard – $150,000 – 32S/16D	(Brazil) Luiz Mattar (Venezuela) Nicolás Pereira; 4–6, 7–6, 6–2	(United States) John Letts (Brazil) Jaime Oncins	(Sweden) Christian Bergström (Italy) Omar Camporese	(Soviet Union) Dimitri Poliakov (India) Ramesh Krishnan (Sweden) Thomas Högstedt (Canada) Andrew Sznajder
7 Jan	Holden NSW Open; Sydney, Australia; ATP World Series; Hard – $225,000 – 32S/16D; Singles – Doubles	(France) Guy Forget; 6–3, 6–4	(Germany) Michael Stich	(United States) Derrick Rostagno (Sweden) Magnus Gustafsson	(Argentina) Martín Jaite (France) Fabrice Santoro (Australia) Johan Anderson (Australia) Darren Cahill
7 Jan	Holden NSW Open; Sydney, Australia; ATP World Series; Hard – $225,000 – 32S/16D; Singles – Doubles	(United States) Scott Davis (United States) David Pate; 3–6, 6–3, 6–2	(Australia) Darren Cahill (Australia) Mark Kratzmann	(United States) Derrick Rostagno (Sweden) Magnus Gustafsson	(Argentina) Martín Jaite (France) Fabrice Santoro (Australia) Johan Anderson (Australia) Darren Cahill
7 Jan	Benson & Hedges Open; Auckland, New Zealand; ATP World Series; Hard – $150,000 – 32S/16D; Singles – Doubles	(Czechoslovakia) Karel Nováček; 7–6^{(7–5)}, 7–6^{(7–4)}	(France) Jean-Philippe Fleurian	(Brazil) Luiz Mattar (Czechoslovakia) Marián Vajda	(Spain) Emilio Sánchez (Sweden) Christian Bergström (Sweden) Lars Jonsson (Germany) Patrik Kühnen
7 Jan	Benson & Hedges Open; Auckland, New Zealand; ATP World Series; Hard – $150,000 – 32S/16D; Singles – Doubles	(Spain) Sergio Casal (Spain) Emilio Sánchez; 4–6, 6–3, 6–4	(Canada) Grant Connell (Canada) Glenn Michibata	(Brazil) Luiz Mattar (Czechoslovakia) Marián Vajda	(Spain) Emilio Sánchez (Sweden) Christian Bergström (Sweden) Lars Jonsson (Germany) Patrik Kühnen
14 Jan; 21 Jan	Australian Open; Melbourne, Australia; Grand Slam; Hard – $2,023,760 – 128S/112Q/64D/32XD; Singles – Doubles – Mixed doubles	(Germany) Boris Becker; 1–6, 6–4, 6–4, 6–4	(Czechoslovakia) Ivan Lendl	(Sweden) Stefan Edberg (United States) Patrick McEnroe	(Peru) Jaime Yzaga (Socialist Federal Republic of Yugoslavia) Goran Prpić (Italy) Cristiano Caratti (France) Guy Forget
14 Jan; 21 Jan	Australian Open; Melbourne, Australia; Grand Slam; Hard – $2,023,760 – 128S/112Q/64D/32XD; Singles – Doubles – Mixed doubles	(United States) Scott Davis (United States) David Pate; 6–7, 7–6, 6–3, 7–5	(United States) Patrick McEnroe (United States) David Wheaton	(Sweden) Stefan Edberg (United States) Patrick McEnroe	(Peru) Jaime Yzaga (Socialist Federal Republic of Yugoslavia) Goran Prpić (Italy) Cristiano Caratti (France) Guy Forget
14 Jan; 21 Jan	Australian Open; Melbourne, Australia; Grand Slam; Hard – $2,023,760 – 128S/112Q/64D/32XD; Singles – Doubles – Mixed doubles	(United Kingdom) Jo Durie (United Kingdom) Jeremy Bates; 2–6, 6–4, 6–4	(United States) Robin White (United States) Scott Davis	(Sweden) Stefan Edberg (United States) Patrick McEnroe	(Peru) Jaime Yzaga (Socialist Federal Republic of Yugoslavia) Goran Prpić (Italy) Cristiano Caratti (France) Guy Forget
28 Jan	Davis Cup by NEC First Round; Mexico City, Mexico – hard Murcia, Spain – clay Christchurch, New Zealand – grass Dortmund, Germany – carpet Zagreb, Yugoslavia – clay (i); Prague, Czechoslovakia – carpet Rennes, France – clay (i); Perth, Australia – grass	First Round winners United States 3–2; Spain 4–1; Argentina 4–1; Germany 3–2; Yugoslavia 4–1; Czechoslovakia 4–1; France 5–0; Australia 5–0	First Round losers Mexico; Canada; New Zealand; Italy; Sweden; Austria; Israel; Belgium		

=== February ===
Week	Tournament	Champions	Runners-up	Semifinalists	Quarterfinalists
4 Feb	Muratti Time Indoor; Milan, Italy; ATP World Series; Carpet (i) – $540,000 – 32S/16D; Singles – Doubles	(Soviet Union) Alexander Volkov; 6–1, 7–5	(Italy) Cristiano Caratti	(Germany) Carl-Uwe Steeb (Switzerland) Jakob Hlasek	(Sweden) Nicklas Kulti (United States) Aaron Krickstein (Sweden) Jan Gunnarsson (Australia) Pat Cash
4 Feb	Muratti Time Indoor; Milan, Italy; ATP World Series; Carpet (i) – $540,000 – 32S/16D; Singles – Doubles	(Italy) Omar Camporese (Socialist Federal Republic of Yugoslavia) Goran Ivanišević; 6–4, 7–6	(Netherlands) Tom Nijssen (Czechoslovakia) Cyril Suk	(Germany) Carl-Uwe Steeb (Switzerland) Jakob Hlasek	(Sweden) Nicklas Kulti (United States) Aaron Krickstein (Sweden) Jan Gunnarsson (Australia) Pat Cash
4 Feb	Volvo San Francisco; San Francisco, CA, US; ATP World Series; Carpet (i) – $225,000 – 32S/16D; Singles – Doubles	(Australia) Darren Cahill; 6–2, 3–6, 6–4	(United States) Brad Gilbert	(United States) Andre Agassi (Australia) Wally Masur	(United States) Kevin Curren (United States) Dan Goldie (United States) John McEnroe (United States) David Pate
4 Feb	Volvo San Francisco; San Francisco, CA, US; ATP World Series; Carpet (i) – $225,000 – 32S/16D; Singles – Doubles	(Australia) Wally Masur (Australia) Jason Stoltenberg; 4–6, 7–6, 6–4	(Sweden) Ronnie Båthman (Sweden) Rikard Bergh	(United States) Andre Agassi (Australia) Wally Masur	(United States) Kevin Curren (United States) Dan Goldie (United States) John McEnroe (United States) David Pate
4 Feb	Chevrolet Classic; Guarujá, Brazil; ATP World Series; Hard – $125,000 – 32S/16D; Singles – Doubles	(Germany) Patrick Baur; 6–2, 6–3	(Brazil) Fernando Roese	(Japan) Shuzo Matsuoka (Canada) Martin Wostenholme	(France) Rodolphe Gilbert (Uruguay) Diego Pérez (Sweden) Henrik Holm (United States) Chris Garner
4 Feb	Chevrolet Classic; Guarujá, Brazil; ATP World Series; Hard – $125,000 – 32S/16D; Singles – Doubles	(France) Olivier Delaître (France) Rodolphe Gilbert; 6–2, 6–4	(United States) Shelby Cannon (United States) Greg Van Emburgh	(Japan) Shuzo Matsuoka (Canada) Martin Wostenholme	(France) Rodolphe Gilbert (Uruguay) Diego Pérez (Sweden) Henrik Holm (United States) Chris Garner
11 Feb	Ebel U.S. Pro Indoor; Philadelphia, PA, US; ATP Championship Series; Carpet (i) – $825,000 – 48S/24D; Singles – Doubles	(Czechoslovakia) Ivan Lendl; 5–7, 6–4, 6–4, 3–6, 6–3	(United States) Pete Sampras	(United States) Brad Gilbert (United States) John McEnroe	(Germany) Michael Stich (United States) Kevin Curren (Finland) Aki Rahunen (Czechoslovakia) Petr Korda
11 Feb	Ebel U.S. Pro Indoor; Philadelphia, PA, US; ATP Championship Series; Carpet (i) – $825,000 – 48S/24D; Singles – Doubles	(United States) Rick Leach (United States) Jim Pugh; 3–6, 7–6, 6–3	(Germany) Udo Riglewski (Germany) Michael Stich	(United States) Brad Gilbert (United States) John McEnroe	(Germany) Michael Stich (United States) Kevin Curren (Finland) Aki Rahunen (Czechoslovakia) Petr Korda
11 Feb	Donnay Indoor Championships; Brussels, Belgium; ATP Championship Series; Carpet (i) – $465,000 – 32S/16D; Singles – Doubles	(France) Guy Forget; 6–3, 7–5, 3–6, 7–6^{(7–5)}	(Soviet Union) Andrei Cherkasov	(Germany) Boris Becker (Sweden) Stefan Edberg	(United States) Michael Chang (Soviet Union) Andrei Chesnokov (Switzerland) Marc Rosset (Switzerland) Jakob Hlasek
11 Feb	Donnay Indoor Championships; Brussels, Belgium; ATP Championship Series; Carpet (i) – $465,000 – 32S/16D; Singles – Doubles	(Australia) Todd Woodbridge (Australia) Mark Woodforde; 6–3, 6–0	(Belgium) Libor Pimek (Netherlands) Michiel Schapers	(Germany) Boris Becker (Sweden) Stefan Edberg	(United States) Michael Chang (Soviet Union) Andrei Chesnokov (Switzerland) Marc Rosset (Switzerland) Jakob Hlasek
18 Feb	Eurocard Open; Stuttgart, Germany; ATP Championship Series; Carpet (i) – $825,000 – 32S/16D	(Sweden) Stefan Edberg; 6–2, 3–6, 7–5, 6–2	(Sweden) Jonas Svensson	(France) Guy Forget (Netherlands) Jan Siemerink	(Czechoslovakia) Karel Nováček (Socialist Federal Republic of Yugoslavia) Goran Ivanišević (Soviet Union) Andrei Cherkasov (Sweden) Magnus Gustafsson
18 Feb	Eurocard Open; Stuttgart, Germany; ATP Championship Series; Carpet (i) – $825,000 – 32S/16D	(Spain) Sergio Casal (Spain) Emilio Sánchez; 6–3, 7–5	(United Kingdom) Jeremy Bates (United Kingdom) Nick Brown	(France) Guy Forget (Netherlands) Jan Siemerink	(Czechoslovakia) Karel Nováček (Socialist Federal Republic of Yugoslavia) Goran Ivanišević (Soviet Union) Andrei Cherkasov (Sweden) Magnus Gustafsson
18 Feb	Volvo Tennis Indoor; Memphis, TN, US; ATP Championship Series; Hard (i) – $600,000 – 48S/24D; Singles – Doubles	(Czechoslovakia) Ivan Lendl; 7–5, 6–3	(Germany) Michael Stich	(United States) Derrick Rostagno (United States) Michael Chang	(United States) Darren Cahill (Italy) Cristiano Caratti (United States) Jeff Tarango (Netherlands) Mark Koevermans
18 Feb	Volvo Tennis Indoor; Memphis, TN, US; ATP Championship Series; Hard (i) – $600,000 – 48S/24D; Singles – Doubles	(Germany) Udo Riglewski (Germany) Michael Stich; 7–5, 6–3	(Australia) John Fitzgerald (Australia) Laurie Warder	(United States) Derrick Rostagno (United States) Michael Chang	(United States) Darren Cahill (Italy) Cristiano Caratti (United States) Jeff Tarango (Netherlands) Mark Koevermans
25 Feb	ABN World Tennis Tournament; Rotterdam, Netherlands; ATP World Series; Carpet (i) – $450,000 – 32S/16D; Singles – Doubles	(Italy) Omar Camporese; 3–6, 7–6^{(7–4)}, 7–6^{(7–4)}	(Czechoslovakia) Ivan Lendl	(Sweden) Anders Järryd (Netherlands) Paul Haarhuis	(Switzerland) Jakob Hlasek (Netherlands) Jan Siemerink (Sweden) Christian Bergström (Czechoslovakia) Karel Nováček
25 Feb	ABN World Tennis Tournament; Rotterdam, Netherlands; ATP World Series; Carpet (i) – $450,000 – 32S/16D; Singles – Doubles	(United States) Patrick Galbraith (Sweden) Anders Järryd; 7–6, 6–2	(United States) Steve DeVries (Australia) David Macpherson	(Sweden) Anders Järryd (Netherlands) Paul Haarhuis	(Switzerland) Jakob Hlasek (Netherlands) Jan Siemerink (Sweden) Christian Bergström (Czechoslovakia) Karel Nováček
25 Feb	Volvo Open; Chicago, IL, US; ATP World Series; Carpet (i) – $225,000 – 32S/16D	(United States) John McEnroe; 3–6, 6–2, 6–4	(United States) Patrick McEnroe	(United States) MaliVai Washington (Canada) Grant Connell	(Germany) Alexander Mronz (Germany) Udo Riglewski (Peru) Jaime Yzaga (United States) Richey Reneberg
25 Feb	Volvo Open; Chicago, IL, US; ATP World Series; Carpet (i) – $225,000 – 32S/16D	(United States) Scott Davis (United States) David Pate; 6–4, 5–7, 7–6	(Canada) Grant Connell (Canada) Glenn Michibata	(United States) MaliVai Washington (Canada) Grant Connell	(Germany) Alexander Mronz (Germany) Udo Riglewski (Peru) Jaime Yzaga (United States) Richey Reneberg

=== March ===
Week	Tournament	Champions	Runners-up	Semifinalists	Quarterfinalists
4 Mar	Newsweek Champions Cup; Indian Wells, CA, US; ATP Championship Series, Single-Week; Hard – $750,000 – 56S/28D; Singles – Doubles	(United States) Jim Courier; 4–6, 6–3, 4–6, 6–3, 7–6^{(7–4)}	(France) Guy Forget	(Sweden) Stefan Edberg (Germany) Michael Stich	(United States) Michael Chang (United States) Scott Davis (United States) Richey Reneberg (Spain) Emilio Sánchez
4 Mar	Newsweek Champions Cup; Indian Wells, CA, US; ATP Championship Series, Single-Week; Hard – $750,000 – 56S/28D; Singles – Doubles	(United States) Jim Courier (Spain) Javier Sánchez; 7–6, 3–6, 6–3	(France) Guy Forget (France) Henri Leconte	(Sweden) Stefan Edberg (Germany) Michael Stich	(United States) Michael Chang (United States) Scott Davis (United States) Richey Reneberg (Spain) Emilio Sánchez
4 Mar	Copenhagen Open; Copenhagen, Denmark; ATP World Series; Carpet (i) – $125,000 – 32S/16D; Singles – Doubles	(Sweden) Jonas Svensson; 6–7^{(5–7)}, 6–2, 6–2	(Sweden) Anders Järryd	(Switzerland) Jakob Hlasek (Australia) Todd Woodbridge	(Sweden) Christian Bergström (Germany) Christian Saceanu (Czechoslovakia) Karel Nováček (Australia) Mark Woodforde
4 Mar	Copenhagen Open; Copenhagen, Denmark; ATP World Series; Carpet (i) – $125,000 – 32S/16D; Singles – Doubles	(Australia) Todd Woodbridge (Australia) Mark Woodforde; 6–3, 6–1	(Iran) Mansour Bahrami (Soviet Union) Andrei Olhovskiy	(Switzerland) Jakob Hlasek (Australia) Todd Woodbridge	(Sweden) Christian Bergström (Germany) Christian Saceanu (Czechoslovakia) Karel Nováček (Australia) Mark Woodforde
11 Mar; 18 Mar	Lipton International Players Championships; Key Biscayne, FL, US; ATP Championship Series, Single-Week; Hard – $1,200,000 – 96S/48D; Singles – Doubles	(United States) Jim Courier; 4–6, 6–3, 6–4	(United States) David Wheaton	(Sweden) Stefan Edberg (United States) Richey Reneberg	(Spain) Emilio Sánchez (Italy) Cristiano Caratti (United States) Derrick Rostagno (Switzerland) Marc Rosset
11 Mar; 18 Mar	Lipton International Players Championships; Key Biscayne, FL, US; ATP Championship Series, Single-Week; Hard – $1,200,000 – 96S/48D; Singles – Doubles	(South Africa) Wayne Ferreira (South Africa) Piet Norval; 6–0, 7–6	(United States) Ken Flach (United States) Robert Seguso	(Sweden) Stefan Edberg (United States) Richey Reneberg	(Spain) Emilio Sánchez (Italy) Cristiano Caratti (United States) Derrick Rostagno (Switzerland) Marc Rosset
25 Mar	Davis Cup by NEC Quarterfinals; Newport, RI, US – grass Berlin, Germany – carpet Prague, Czechoslovakia – carpet Nîmes, France – clay	Quarterfinal winners United States 4–1; Germany 5–0; Yugoslavia 4–1; France 3–2	Quarterfinal losers Spain; Argentina; Czechoslovakia; Australia		

=== April ===
Week	Tournament	Champions	Runners-up	Semifinalists	Quarterfinalists
1 Apr	Estoril Open; Oeiras, Portugal; ATP World Series; Clay – $337,500 – 32S/16D; Singles – Doubles	(Spain) Sergi Bruguera; 7–6^{(9–7)}, 6–1	(Czechoslovakia) Karel Nováček	(Czechoslovakia) Marián Vajda (Soviet Union) Andrei Chesnokov	(Spain) Javier Sánchez (Spain) Francisco Clavet (Austria) Horst Skoff (Italy) Renzo Furlan
1 Apr	Estoril Open; Oeiras, Portugal; ATP World Series; Clay – $337,500 – 32S/16D; Singles – Doubles	(Netherlands) Paul Haarhuis (Netherlands) Mark Koevermans; 6–3, 6–3	(Netherlands) Tom Nijssen (Czechoslovakia) Cyril Suk	(Czechoslovakia) Marián Vajda (Soviet Union) Andrei Chesnokov	(Spain) Javier Sánchez (Spain) Francisco Clavet (Austria) Horst Skoff (Italy) Renzo Furlan
1 Apr	Salem Open; Hong Kong, Hong Kong; ATP World Series; Hard – $234,000 – 32S/16D; Singles – Doubles	(Netherlands) Richard Krajicek; 6–2, 3–6, 6–3	(Australia) Wally Masur	(South Africa) Gary Muller (Austria) Alex Antonitsch	(United States) Michael Chang (Germany) Patrik Kühnen (Philippines) Felix Barrientos (Germany) Alexander Mronz
1 Apr	Salem Open; Hong Kong, Hong Kong; ATP World Series; Hard – $234,000 – 32S/16D; Singles – Doubles	(United States) Patrick Galbraith (United States) Todd Witsken; 6–2, 6–4	(Canada) Glenn Michibata (United States) Robert Van't Hof	(South Africa) Gary Muller (Austria) Alex Antonitsch	(United States) Michael Chang (Germany) Patrik Kühnen (Philippines) Felix Barrientos (Germany) Alexander Mronz
1 Apr	Prudential-Bache Securities Classic; Orlando, FL, US; ATP World Series; Hard – $225,000 – 32S/16D; Singles – Doubles	(United States) Andre Agassi; 6–2, 1–6, 6–3	(United States) Derrick Rostagno	(United States) MaliVai Washington (United States) Pete Sampras	(United States) Chuck Adams (United States) Brad Gilbert (United States) Jimmy Arias (United States) David Pate
1 Apr	Prudential-Bache Securities Classic; Orlando, FL, US; ATP World Series; Hard – $225,000 – 32S/16D; Singles – Doubles	(United States) Luke Jensen (United States) Scott Melville; 6–7, 7–6, 6–3	(Venezuela) Nicolás Pereira (United States) Pete Sampras	(United States) MaliVai Washington (United States) Pete Sampras	(United States) Chuck Adams (United States) Brad Gilbert (United States) Jimmy Arias (United States) David Pate
8 Apr	Suntory Japan Open Tennis Championships; Tokyo, Japan; ATP Championship Series; Hard – $825,000 – 56S/28D; Singles – Doubles	(Sweden) Stefan Edberg; 6–1, 7–5, 6–0	(Czechoslovakia) Ivan Lendl	(United States) Michael Chang (United States) Jim Courier	(Germany) Michael Stich (Australia) Pat Cash (United States) John McEnroe (Switzerland) Jakob Hlasek
8 Apr	Suntory Japan Open Tennis Championships; Tokyo, Japan; ATP Championship Series; Hard – $825,000 – 56S/28D; Singles – Doubles	(Sweden) Stefan Edberg (Australia) Todd Woodbridge; 6–3, 7–6	(Australia) John Fitzgerald (Sweden) Anders Järryd	(United States) Michael Chang (United States) Jim Courier	(Germany) Michael Stich (Australia) Pat Cash (United States) John McEnroe (Switzerland) Jakob Hlasek
8 Apr	Trofeo Conde de Godó; Barcelona, Spain; ATP Championship Series; Clay – $510,000 – 56S/28D; Singles – Doubles	(Spain) Emilio Sánchez; 6–4, 7–6^{(9–7)}, 6–2	(Spain) Sergi Bruguera	(Argentina) Guillermo Pérez Roldán (Argentina) Martín Jaite	(Soviet Union) Andrei Chesnokov (United States) Andre Agassi (Finland) Veli Paloheimo (Italy) Omar Camporese
8 Apr	Trofeo Conde de Godó; Barcelona, Spain; ATP Championship Series; Clay – $510,000 – 56S/28D; Singles – Doubles	(Argentina) Horacio de la Peña (Italy) Diego Nargiso; 6–4, 4–6, 6–4	(Germany) Boris Becker (Germany) Eric Jelen	(Argentina) Guillermo Pérez Roldán (Argentina) Martín Jaite	(Soviet Union) Andrei Chesnokov (United States) Andre Agassi (Finland) Veli Paloheimo (Italy) Omar Camporese
15 Apr	Philips Open; Nice, France; ATP World Series; Clay – $225,000 – 32S/16D	(Argentina) Martín Jaite; 3–6, 7–6^{(7–1)}, 6–3	(Socialist Federal Republic of Yugoslavia) Goran Prpić	(Czechoslovakia) Karel Nováček (France) Cédric Pioline	(Italy) Renzo Furlan (Argentina) Alberto Mancini (Argentina) Horacio de la Peña (France) Henri Leconte
15 Apr	Philips Open; Nice, France; ATP World Series; Clay – $225,000 – 32S/16D	(Sweden) Rikard Bergh (Sweden) Jan Gunnarsson; 6–4, 4–6, 6–3	(Czechoslovakia) Vojtěch Flégl (Sweden) Nicklas Utgren	(Czechoslovakia) Karel Nováček (France) Cédric Pioline	(Italy) Renzo Furlan (Argentina) Alberto Mancini (Argentina) Horacio de la Peña (France) Henri Leconte
15 Apr	KAL Cup Korea Open; Seoul, South Korea; ATP World Series; Hard – $140,000 – 32S/16D; Singles – Doubles	(Germany) Patrick Baur; 6–4, 1–6, 7–6^{(7–5)}	(United States) Jeff Tarango	(Japan) Shuzo Matsuoka (Mexico) Luis Herrera	(Netherlands) Jan Siemerink (Netherlands) Richard Krajicek (Israel) Gilad Bloom (Austria) Alex Antonitsch
15 Apr	KAL Cup Korea Open; Seoul, South Korea; ATP World Series; Hard – $140,000 – 32S/16D; Singles – Doubles	(Austria) Alex Antonitsch (Israel) Gilad Bloom; 7–6, 6–1	(United States) Kent Kinnear (United States) Sven Salumaa	(Japan) Shuzo Matsuoka (Mexico) Luis Herrera	(Netherlands) Jan Siemerink (Netherlands) Richard Krajicek (Israel) Gilad Bloom (Austria) Alex Antonitsch
22 Apr	Monte Carlo Open; Roquebrune-Cap-Martin, France; ATP Championship Series, Single-Week; Clay – $750,000 – 56S/28D; Singles – Doubles	(Spain) Sergi Bruguera; 5–7, 6–4, 7–6^{(8–6)}, 7–6^{(7–4)}	(Germany) Boris Becker	(Austria) Horst Skoff (Socialist Federal Republic of Yugoslavia) Goran Prpić	(Sweden) Magnus Gustafsson (Sweden) Jonas Svensson (Germany) Carl-Uwe Steeb (Soviet Union) Andrei Chesnokov
22 Apr	Monte Carlo Open; Roquebrune-Cap-Martin, France; ATP Championship Series, Single-Week; Clay – $750,000 – 56S/28D; Singles – Doubles	(United States) Luke Jensen (Australia) Laurie Warder; 6–4, 6–3	(Netherlands) Paul Haarhuis (Netherlands) Mark Koevermans	(Austria) Horst Skoff (Socialist Federal Republic of Yugoslavia) Goran Prpić	(Sweden) Magnus Gustafsson (Sweden) Jonas Svensson (Germany) Carl-Uwe Steeb (Soviet Union) Andrei Chesnokov
22 Apr	Epson Singapore Super Tennis; Singapore, Singapore; ATP World Series; Hard – $215,000 – 32S/16D	(Netherlands) Jan Siemerink; 6–4, 6–3	(Israel) Gilad Bloom	(Australia) Jason Stoltenberg (Canada) Grant Connell	(Australia) Todd Woodbridge (Canada) Glenn Michibata (Sweden) Thomas Högstedt (Japan) Shuzo Matsuoka
22 Apr	Epson Singapore Super Tennis; Singapore, Singapore; ATP World Series; Hard – $215,000 – 32S/16D	(Canada) Grant Connell (Canada) Glenn Michibata; 6–4, 5–7, 7–6	(South Africa) Stefan Kruger (South Africa) Christo van Rensburg	(Australia) Jason Stoltenberg (Canada) Grant Connell	(Australia) Todd Woodbridge (Canada) Glenn Michibata (Sweden) Thomas Högstedt (Japan) Shuzo Matsuoka
29 Apr	Trofeo Villa de Madrid; Madrid, Spain; ATP World Series; Clay – $450,000 – 32S/16D; Singles – Doubles	(Spain) Jordi Arrese; 6–2, 6–4	(Uruguay) Marcelo Filippini	(Czechoslovakia) Karel Nováček (Spain) Javier Sánchez	(France) Thierry Champion (Argentina) Franco Davín (Netherlands) Jacco Eltingh (Spain) Germán López
29 Apr	Trofeo Villa de Madrid; Madrid, Spain; ATP World Series; Clay – $450,000 – 32S/16D; Singles – Doubles	(Argentina) Gustavo Luza (Brazil) Cássio Motta; 6–0, 7–5	(Brazil) Luiz Mattar (Brazil) Jaime Oncins	(Czechoslovakia) Karel Nováček (Spain) Javier Sánchez	(France) Thierry Champion (Argentina) Franco Davín (Netherlands) Jacco Eltingh (Spain) Germán López
29 Apr	BMW Open; Munich, Germany; ATP World Series; Clay – $225,000 – 32S/16D; Singles – Doubles	(Sweden) Magnus Gustafsson; 3–6, 6–3, 4–3 retired	(Argentina) Guillermo Pérez Roldán	(Czechoslovakia) Ivan Lendl (Sweden) Christian Bergström	(United States) Todd Witsken (Germany) Udo Riglewski (Sweden) Lars Jonsson (Socialist Federal Republic of Yugoslavia) Goran Ivanišević
29 Apr	BMW Open; Munich, Germany; ATP World Series; Clay – $225,000 – 32S/16D; Singles – Doubles	(United States) Patrick Galbraith (United States) Todd Witsken; 6–1, 6–3	(Sweden) Anders Järryd (South Africa) Danie Visser	(Czechoslovakia) Ivan Lendl (Sweden) Christian Bergström	(United States) Todd Witsken (Germany) Udo Riglewski (Sweden) Lars Jonsson (Socialist Federal Republic of Yugoslavia) Goran Ivanišević
29 Apr	USTA Clay Court Championships of Tampa; Tampa, FL, US; ATP World Series; Clay – $225,000 – 32S/16D	(United States) Richey Reneberg; 4–6, 6–4, 6–2	(Czechoslovakia) Petr Korda	(Peru) Pablo Arraya (United States) Chris Garner	(United States) MaliVai Washington (New Zealand) Kelly Evernden (Sweden) Mikael Pernfors (Argentina) Javier Frana
29 Apr	USTA Clay Court Championships of Tampa; Tampa, FL, US; ATP World Series; Clay – $225,000 – 32S/16D	(United States) Ken Flach (United States) Robert Seguso; 6–7, 6–4, 6–1	(United States) David Pate (United States) Richey Reneberg	(Peru) Pablo Arraya (United States) Chris Garner	(United States) MaliVai Washington (New Zealand) Kelly Evernden (Sweden) Mikael Pernfors (Argentina) Javier Frana

=== May ===
Week	Tournament	Champions	Runners-up	Semifinalists	Quarterfinalists
6 May	German Open; Hamburg, Germany; ATP Championship Series, Single-Week; Clay – $750,000 – 56S/28D; Singles – Doubles	(Czechoslovakia) Karel Nováček; 6–3, 6–3, 5–7, 0–6, 6–1	(Sweden) Magnus Gustafsson	(Germany) Michael Stich (Socialist Federal Republic of Yugoslavia) Goran Prpić	(Sweden) Stefan Edberg (Netherlands) Mark Koevermans (Socialist Federal Republic of Yugoslavia) Goran Ivanišević (France) Yannick Noah
6 May	German Open; Hamburg, Germany; ATP Championship Series, Single-Week; Clay – $750,000 – 56S/28D; Singles – Doubles	(Spain) Sergio Casal (Spain) Emilio Sánchez; 7–6, 7–6	(Brazil) Cássio Motta (South Africa) Danie Visser	(Germany) Michael Stich (Socialist Federal Republic of Yugoslavia) Goran Prpić	(Sweden) Stefan Edberg (Netherlands) Mark Koevermans (Socialist Federal Republic of Yugoslavia) Goran Ivanišević (France) Yannick Noah
6 May	U.S. Men's Clay Court Championships; Charlotte, NC, US; ATP World Series; Clay – $215,000 – 32S/16D; Singles – Doubles	(Peru) Jaime Yzaga; 6–3, 7–5	(United States) Jimmy Arias	(United States) MaliVai Washington (Argentina) Javier Frana	(United States) Michael Chang (United States) David Wheaton (United States) Richey Reneberg (Peru) Pablo Arraya
6 May	U.S. Men's Clay Court Championships; Charlotte, NC, US; ATP World Series; Clay – $215,000 – 32S/16D; Singles – Doubles	(United States) Rick Leach (United States) Jim Pugh; 6–3, 2–6, 6–3	(United States) Bret Garnett (United States) Greg Van Emburgh	(United States) MaliVai Washington (Argentina) Javier Frana	(United States) Michael Chang (United States) David Wheaton (United States) Richey Reneberg (Peru) Pablo Arraya
13 May	Italian Open; Rome, Italy; ATP Championship Series, Single-Week; Clay – $1,002,000 – 64S/32D; Singles – Doubles	(Spain) Emilio Sánchez; 6–3, 6–1, 3–0 retired	(Argentina) Alberto Mancini	(Socialist Federal Republic of Yugoslavia) Goran Prpić (Spain) Sergi Bruguera	(Australia) Richard Fromberg (Soviet Union) Andrei Cherkasov (France) Fabrice Santoro (Argentina) Horacio de la Peña
13 May	Italian Open; Rome, Italy; ATP Championship Series, Single-Week; Clay – $1,002,000 – 64S/32D; Singles – Doubles	(Italy) Omar Camporese (Socialist Federal Republic of Yugoslavia) Goran Ivanišević; 6–2, 6–3	(United States) Luke Jensen (Australia) Laurie Warder	(Socialist Federal Republic of Yugoslavia) Goran Prpić (Spain) Sergi Bruguera	(Australia) Richard Fromberg (Soviet Union) Andrei Cherkasov (France) Fabrice Santoro (Argentina) Horacio de la Peña
13 May	Yugoslav Open; Umag, Yugoslavia; ATP World Series; Clay – $215,000 – 32S/16D; Singles – Doubles	(Soviet Union) Dimitri Poliakov; 6–4, 6–4	(Spain) Javier Sánchez	(Czechoslovakia) Petr Korda (France) Jean-Philippe Fleurian	(United States) Richey Reneberg (Socialist Federal Republic of Yugoslavia) Bruno Orešar (Spain) Francisco Clavet (Czechoslovakia) Marián Vajda
13 May	Yugoslav Open; Umag, Yugoslavia; ATP World Series; Clay – $215,000 – 32S/16D; Singles – Doubles	(Israel) Gilad Bloom (Spain) Javier Sánchez; 7–6, 2–6, 6–1	(United States) Richey Reneberg (United States) David Wheaton	(Czechoslovakia) Petr Korda (France) Jean-Philippe Fleurian	(United States) Richey Reneberg (Socialist Federal Republic of Yugoslavia) Bruno Orešar (Spain) Francisco Clavet (Czechoslovakia) Marián Vajda
20 May	Peugeot World Team Cup; Düsseldorf, Germany; Clay – $1,277,500 – 8 teams (RR)	Sweden; 2–1	Yugoslavia	Round Robin (Red Group)	Round Robin (Blue Group)
20 May	Internazionali Cassa di Risparmio; Bologna, Italy; ATP World Series; Clay – $225,000 – 32S/16D	(Italy) Paolo Canè; 5–7, 6–3, 7–5	(Sweden) Jan Gunnarsson	(United States) Jeff Tarango (Italy) Omar Camporese	(Brazil) Jaime Oncins (Austria) Thomas Muster (Belgium) Eduardo Masso (Brazil) Luiz Mattar
20 May	Internazionali Cassa di Risparmio; Bologna, Italy; ATP World Series; Clay – $225,000 – 32S/16D	(United States) Luke Jensen (Australia) Laurie Warder; 6–4, 7–6	(Brazil) Luiz Mattar (Brazil) Jaime Oncins	(United States) Jeff Tarango (Italy) Omar Camporese	(Brazil) Jaime Oncins (Austria) Thomas Muster (Belgium) Eduardo Masso (Brazil) Luiz Mattar
27 May; 3 Jun	French Open; Paris, France; Grand Slam; Clay – $3,481,550 – 128S/64D/48XD; Singles – Doubles – Mixed doubles	(United States) Jim Courier; 3–6, 6–4, 2–6, 6–1, 6–4	(United States) Andre Agassi	(Germany) Michael Stich (Germany) Boris Becker	(Sweden) Stefan Edberg (Argentina) Franco Davín (Switzerland) Jakob Hlasek (United States) Michael Chang
27 May; 3 Jun	French Open; Paris, France; Grand Slam; Clay – $3,481,550 – 128S/64D/48XD; Singles – Doubles – Mixed doubles	(Australia) John Fitzgerald (Sweden) Anders Järryd; 6–0, 7–6	(United States) Rick Leach (United States) Jim Pugh	(Germany) Michael Stich (Germany) Boris Becker	(Sweden) Stefan Edberg (Argentina) Franco Davín (Switzerland) Jakob Hlasek (United States) Michael Chang
27 May; 3 Jun	French Open; Paris, France; Grand Slam; Clay – $3,481,550 – 128S/64D/48XD; Singles – Doubles – Mixed doubles	(Czechoslovakia) Helena Suková (Czechoslovakia) Cyril Suk; 3–6, 6–4, 6–1	(Netherlands) Caroline Vis (Netherlands) Paul Haarhuis	(Germany) Michael Stich (Germany) Boris Becker	(Sweden) Stefan Edberg (Argentina) Franco Davín (Switzerland) Jakob Hlasek (United States) Michael Chang

=== June ===
Week	Tournament	Champions	Runners-up	Semifinalists	Quarterfinalists
10 Jun	Stella Artois Championships; London, Great Britain; ATP World Series; Grass – $450,000 – 56S/28D; Singles – Doubles	(Sweden) Stefan Edberg; 6–2, 6–3	(United States) David Wheaton	(United States) MaliVai Washington (Sweden) Anders Järryd	(Australia) Pat Cash (Australia) John Fitzgerald (United States) Michael Chang (Canada) Grant Connell
10 Jun	Stella Artois Championships; London, Great Britain; ATP World Series; Grass – $450,000 – 56S/28D; Singles – Doubles	(Australia) Todd Woodbridge (Australia) Mark Woodforde; 7–6, 6–4	(Canada) Grant Connell (Canada) Glenn Michibata	(United States) MaliVai Washington (Sweden) Anders Järryd	(Australia) Pat Cash (Australia) John Fitzgerald (United States) Michael Chang (Canada) Grant Connell
10 Jun	Torneo Internazionale Città di Firenze; Florence, Italy; ATP World Series; Clay – $225,000 – 32S/16D	(Austria) Thomas Muster; 6–2, 6–7^{(2–7)}, 6–4	(Austria) Horst Skoff	(Belgium) Eduardo Masso (Spain) Carlos Costa	(Argentina) Gabriel Markus (Sweden) Magnus Larsson (United States) Jimmy Arias (France) Fabrice Santoro
10 Jun	Torneo Internazionale Città di Firenze; Florence, Italy; ATP World Series; Clay – $225,000 – 32S/16D	(Sweden) Ola Jonsson (Sweden) Magnus Larsson; 3–6, 6–1, 6–1	(Spain) Juan Carlos Báguena (Spain) Carlos Costa	(Belgium) Eduardo Masso (Spain) Carlos Costa	(Argentina) Gabriel Markus (Sweden) Magnus Larsson (United States) Jimmy Arias (France) Fabrice Santoro
10 Jun	Continental Grass Court Championships; Rosmalen, Netherlands; ATP World Series; Grass – $225,000 – 32S/16D	(Germany) Christian Saceanu; 6–1, 3–6, 7–5	(Netherlands) Michiel Schapers	(Switzerland) Jakob Hlasek (Germany) Michael Stich	(Soviet Union) Andrei Olhovskiy (Israel) Amos Mansdorf (Italy) Diego Nargiso (Netherlands) Richard Krajicek
10 Jun	Continental Grass Court Championships; Rosmalen, Netherlands; ATP World Series; Grass – $225,000 – 32S/16D	(Netherlands) Hendrik Jan Davids (Netherlands) Paul Haarhuis; 6–3, 7–6	(Netherlands) Richard Krajicek (Netherlands) Jan Siemerink	(Switzerland) Jakob Hlasek (Germany) Michael Stich	(Soviet Union) Andrei Olhovskiy (Israel) Amos Mansdorf (Italy) Diego Nargiso (Netherlands) Richard Krajicek
17 Jun	Campionati Internazionali di Puglia; Genova, Italy; ATP World Series; Clay – $225,000 – 32S/16D	(Germany) Carl-Uwe Steeb; 6–3, 6–4	(Spain) Jordi Arrese	(Austria) Thomas Muster (Belgium) Eduardo Masso	(Haiti) Ronald Agénor (France) Cédric Pioline (Argentina) Roberto Azar (France) Jean-Philippe Fleurian
17 Jun	Campionati Internazionali di Puglia; Genova, Italy; ATP World Series; Clay – $225,000 – 32S/16D	(Spain) Marcos Aurelio Gorriz (Venezuela) Alfonso Mora; 5–7, 7–5, 6–3	(Italy) Massimo Ardinghi (Italy) Massimo Boscatto	(Austria) Thomas Muster (Belgium) Eduardo Masso	(Haiti) Ronald Agénor (France) Cédric Pioline (Argentina) Roberto Azar (France) Jean-Philippe Fleurian
17 Jun	Direct Line Insurance Open; Manchester, Great Britain; ATP World Series; Grass – $225,000 – 32S/16D; Singles – Doubles	(Socialist Federal Republic of Yugoslavia) Goran Ivanišević; 6–4, 6–4	(United States) Pete Sampras	(Finland) Veli Paloheimo (South Africa) Gary Muller	(Australia) Wally Masur (Israel) Amos Mansdorf (United States) Todd Witsken (Germany) Arne Thoms
17 Jun	Direct Line Insurance Open; Manchester, Great Britain; ATP World Series; Grass – $225,000 – 32S/16D; Singles – Doubles	(Italy) Omar Camporese (Socialist Federal Republic of Yugoslavia) Goran Ivanišević; 6–4, 6–3	(United Kingdom) Nick Brown (United Kingdom) Andrew Castle	(Finland) Veli Paloheimo (South Africa) Gary Muller	(Australia) Wally Masur (Israel) Amos Mansdorf (United States) Todd Witsken (Germany) Arne Thoms
24 Jun; 1 Jul	Wimbledon Championships; London, Great Britain; Grand Slam; Grass – $3,460,438 – 128S/64D/64XD; Singles – Doubles – Mixed doubles	(Germany) Michael Stich; 6–4, 7–6^{(7–4)}, 6–4	(Germany) Boris Becker	(Sweden) Stefan Edberg (United States) David Wheaton	(France) Thierry Champion (United States) Jim Courier (United States) Andre Agassi (France) Guy Forget
24 Jun; 1 Jul	Wimbledon Championships; London, Great Britain; Grand Slam; Grass – $3,460,438 – 128S/64D/64XD; Singles – Doubles – Mixed doubles	(Australia) John Fitzgerald (Sweden) Anders Järryd; 6–3, 6–4, 6–7^{(7–9)}, 6–1	(Argentina) Javier Frana (Mexico) Leonardo Lavalle	(Sweden) Stefan Edberg (United States) David Wheaton	(France) Thierry Champion (United States) Jim Courier (United States) Andre Agassi (France) Guy Forget
24 Jun; 1 Jul	Wimbledon Championships; London, Great Britain; Grand Slam; Grass – $3,460,438 – 128S/64D/64XD; Singles – Doubles – Mixed doubles	(Australia) Elizabeth Smylie (Australia) John Fitzgerald; 7–6^{(7–4)}, 6–2	(Soviet Union) Natasha Zvereva (United States) Jim Pugh	(Sweden) Stefan Edberg (United States) David Wheaton	(France) Thierry Champion (United States) Jim Courier (United States) Andre Agassi (France) Guy Forget

=== July ===
Week	Tournament	Champions	Runners-up	Semifinalists	Quarterfinalists
8 Jul	Rado Swiss Open; Gstaad, Switzerland; ATP World Series; Clay – $275,000 – 32S/16D; Singles – Doubles	(Spain) Emilio Sánchez; 6–1, 6–4, 6–4	(Spain) Sergi Bruguera	(Croatia) Goran Ivanišević (Czechoslovakia) Karel Nováček	(Ecuador) Andrés Gómez (Argentina) Horacio de la Peña (Argentina) Martín Jaite (Germany) Michael Stich
8 Jul	Rado Swiss Open; Gstaad, Switzerland; ATP World Series; Clay – $275,000 – 32S/16D; Singles – Doubles	(South Africa) Gary Muller (South Africa) Danie Visser; 7–6, 6–4	(France) Guy Forget (Switzerland) Jakob Hlasek	(Croatia) Goran Ivanišević (Czechoslovakia) Karel Nováček	(Ecuador) Andrés Gómez (Argentina) Horacio de la Peña (Argentina) Martín Jaite (Germany) Michael Stich
8 Jul	Swedish Open; Båstad, Sweden; ATP World Series; Clay – $225,000 – 32S/16D; Singles – Doubles	(Sweden) Magnus Gustafsson; 6–1, 6–2	(Argentina) Alberto Mancini	(Soviet Union) Alexander Volkov (Sweden) Christian Bergström	(Sweden) Magnus Larsson (Sweden) Lars Jonsson (Sweden) Jan Gunnarsson (Peru) Pablo Arraya
8 Jul	Swedish Open; Båstad, Sweden; ATP World Series; Clay – $225,000 – 32S/16D; Singles – Doubles	(Sweden) Ronnie Båthman (Sweden) Rikard Bergh; 6–4, 6–4	(Sweden) Magnus Gustafsson (Sweden) Anders Järryd	(Soviet Union) Alexander Volkov (Sweden) Christian Bergström	(Sweden) Magnus Larsson (Sweden) Lars Jonsson (Sweden) Jan Gunnarsson (Peru) Pablo Arraya
8 Jul	Miller Lite Hall of Fame Championships; Newport, RI, US; ATP World Series; Grass – $150,000 – 32S/16D; Singles – Doubles	(United States) Bryan Shelton; 3–6, 6–4, 6–4	(Argentina) Javier Frana	(United States) Todd Martin (Australia) Mark Kratzmann	(Canada) Martin Wostenholme (South Africa) Christo van Rensburg (Netherlands) Jacco Eltingh (United States) Glenn Layendecker
8 Jul	Miller Lite Hall of Fame Championships; Newport, RI, US; ATP World Series; Grass – $150,000 – 32S/16D; Singles – Doubles	(Italy) Gianluca Pozzi (New Zealand) Brett Steven; 6–4, 6–4	(Argentina) Javier Frana (United States) Bruce Steel	(United States) Todd Martin (Australia) Mark Kratzmann	(Canada) Martin Wostenholme (South Africa) Christo van Rensburg (Netherlands) Jacco Eltingh (United States) Glenn Layendecker
15 Jul	Mercedes Cup; Stuttgart, Germany; ATP Championship Series; Clay – $825,000 – 48S/24D; Singles – Doubles	(Germany) Michael Stich; 1–6, 7–6^{(11–9)}, 6–4, 6–2	(Argentina) Alberto Mancini	(Spain) Francisco Clavet (Germany) Lars Koslowski	(Netherlands) Richard Krajicek (France) Cédric Pioline (Spain) Germán López (Croatia) Goran Prpić
15 Jul	Mercedes Cup; Stuttgart, Germany; ATP Championship Series; Clay – $825,000 – 48S/24D; Singles – Doubles	(Australia) Wally Masur (Spain) Emilio Sánchez; 2–6, 6–3, 6–4	(Italy) Omar Camporese (Croatia) Goran Ivanišević	(Spain) Francisco Clavet (Germany) Lars Koslowski	(Netherlands) Richard Krajicek (France) Cédric Pioline (Spain) Germán López (Croatia) Goran Prpić
15 Jul	Sovran Bank Classic; Washington, D.C., US; ATP Championship Series; Hard – $465,000 – 56S/28D; Singles – Doubles	(United States) Andre Agassi; 6–3, 6–4	(Czechoslovakia) Petr Korda	(Peru) Jaime Yzaga (Germany) Markus Zoecke	(Sweden) Johan Carlsson (United States) Richey Reneberg (United States) Brad Gilbert (Mexico) Luis Herrera
15 Jul	Sovran Bank Classic; Washington, D.C., US; ATP Championship Series; Hard – $465,000 – 56S/28D; Singles – Doubles	(United States) Scott Davis (United States) David Pate; 7–6, 7–6	(United States) Ken Flach (United States) Robert Seguso	(Peru) Jaime Yzaga (Germany) Markus Zoecke	(Sweden) Johan Carlsson (United States) Richey Reneberg (United States) Brad Gilbert (Mexico) Luis Herrera
22 Jul	Player's Canadian Open; Montreal, Quebec, Canada; ATP Championship Series, Single-Week; Hard – $930,000 – 56S/28D; Singles – Doubles	(Soviet Union) Andrei Chesnokov; 3–6, 6–4, 6–3	(Czechoslovakia) Petr Korda	(Czechoslovakia) Ivan Lendl (United States) Jim Courier	(United States) Jim Grabb (Japan) Shuzo Matsuoka (Switzerland) Jakob Hlasek (United States) Derrick Rostagno
22 Jul	Player's Canadian Open; Montreal, Quebec, Canada; ATP Championship Series, Single-Week; Hard – $930,000 – 56S/28D; Singles – Doubles	(United States) Patrick Galbraith (United States) Todd Witsken; 6–7, 6–4, 6–4	(Canada) Grant Connell (Canada) Glenn Michibata	(Czechoslovakia) Ivan Lendl (United States) Jim Courier	(United States) Jim Grabb (Japan) Shuzo Matsuoka (Switzerland) Jakob Hlasek (United States) Derrick Rostagno
22 Jul	Dutch Open; Hilversum, Netherlands; ATP World Series; Clay – $215,000 – 32S/16D; Singles – Doubles	(Sweden) Magnus Gustafsson; 5–7, 7–6^{(7–2)}, 2–6, 6–1, 6–0	(Spain) Jordi Arrese	(Netherlands) Mark Koevermans (Czechoslovakia) Karel Nováček	(Italy) Renzo Furlan (Austria) Thomas Muster (Switzerland) Marc Rosset (Argentina) Franco Davín
22 Jul	Dutch Open; Hilversum, Netherlands; ATP World Series; Clay – $215,000 – 32S/16D; Singles – Doubles	(Netherlands) Richard Krajicek (Netherlands) Jan Siemerink; 7–5, 6–4	(Spain) Francisco Clavet (Sweden) Magnus Gustafsson	(Netherlands) Mark Koevermans (Czechoslovakia) Karel Nováček	(Italy) Renzo Furlan (Austria) Thomas Muster (Switzerland) Marc Rosset (Argentina) Franco Davín
29 Jul	Philips Austrian Open; Kitzbühel, Austria; ATP World Series; Clay – $337,500 – 48S/24D; Singles – Doubles	(Czechoslovakia) Karel Nováček; 7–6^{(7–2)}, 7–6^{(7–4)}, 6–2	(Sweden) Magnus Gustafsson	(Spain) Francisco Clavet (Argentina) Martín Jaite	(Germany) Markus Zillner (Austria) Horst Skoff (France) Thierry Champion (Spain) Emilio Sánchez
29 Jul	Philips Austrian Open; Kitzbühel, Austria; ATP World Series; Clay – $337,500 – 48S/24D; Singles – Doubles	(Spain) Tomás Carbonell (Spain) Francisco Roig; Walkover	(Peru) Pablo Arraya (Soviet Union) Dimitri Poliakov	(Spain) Francisco Clavet (Argentina) Martín Jaite	(Germany) Markus Zillner (Austria) Horst Skoff (France) Thierry Champion (Spain) Emilio Sánchez
29 Jul	Volvo Tennis/Los Angeles; Los Angeles, CA, US; ATP World Series; Hard – $225,000 – 32S/16D; Singles – Doubles	(United States) Pete Sampras; 6–2, 6–7^{(5–7)}, 6–3	(United States) Brad Gilbert	(Sweden) Stefan Edberg (Italy) Stefano Pescosolido	(United States) Aaron Krickstein (United States) Steve Bryan (United States) Scott Davis (Israel) Amos Mansdorf
29 Jul	Volvo Tennis/Los Angeles; Los Angeles, CA, US; ATP World Series; Hard – $225,000 – 32S/16D; Singles – Doubles	(Argentina) Javier Frana (United States) Jim Pugh; 7–5, 2–6, 6–4	(Canada) Glenn Michibata (United States) Brad Pearce	(Sweden) Stefan Edberg (Italy) Stefano Pescosolido	(United States) Aaron Krickstein (United States) Steve Bryan (United States) Scott Davis (Israel) Amos Mansdorf
29 Jul	Campionati Internazionali di San Marino; San Marino, San Marino; ATP World Series; Clay – $250,000 – 32S/16D; Singles – Doubles	(Argentina) Guillermo Pérez Roldán; 6–3, 6–1	(France) Frédéric Fontang	(Italy) Renzo Furlan (Argentina) Roberto Azar	(Spain) Carlos Costa (Argentina) Franco Davín (Sweden) Nicklas Kulti (Switzerland) Claudio Mezzadri
29 Jul	Campionati Internazionali di San Marino; San Marino, San Marino; ATP World Series; Clay – $250,000 – 32S/16D; Singles – Doubles	(Spain) Jordi Arrese (Spain) Carlos Costa; 6–3, 3–6, 6–3	(Argentina) Christian Miniussi (Uruguay) Diego Pérez	(Italy) Renzo Furlan (Argentina) Roberto Azar	(Spain) Carlos Costa (Argentina) Franco Davín (Sweden) Nicklas Kulti (Switzerland) Claudio Mezzadri

=== August ===
Week	Tournament	Champions	Runners-up	Semifinalists	Quarterfinalists
5 Aug	Thriftway ATP Championships; Mason, OH, US; ATP Championship Series, Single-Week; Hard – $1,020,000 – 56S/28D; Singles – Doubles	(France) Guy Forget; 2–6, 7–6^{(7–4)}, 6–4	(United States) Pete Sampras	(Germany) Boris Becker (United States) Jim Courier	(Soviet Union) Andrei Cherkasov (United States) Derrick Rostagno (United States) Brad Gilbert (Sweden) Stefan Edberg
5 Aug	Thriftway ATP Championships; Mason, OH, US; ATP Championship Series, Single-Week; Hard – $1,020,000 – 56S/28D; Singles – Doubles	(United States) Ken Flach (United States) Robert Seguso; 6–3, 6–4	(Canada) Grant Connell (Canada) Glenn Michibata	(Germany) Boris Becker (United States) Jim Courier	(Soviet Union) Andrei Cherkasov (United States) Derrick Rostagno (United States) Brad Gilbert (Sweden) Stefan Edberg
5 Aug	Czechoslovak Open; Prague, Czechoslovakia; ATP World Series; Clay – $305,000 – 32S/16D; Singles – Doubles	(Czechoslovakia) Karel Nováček; 7–6^{(7–5)}, 6–2	(Sweden) Magnus Gustafsson	(Argentina) Guillermo Pérez Roldán (Austria) Thomas Muster	(France) Arnaud Boetsch (Austria) Horst Skoff (Sweden) Magnus Larsson (Argentina) Horacio de la Peña
5 Aug	Czechoslovak Open; Prague, Czechoslovakia; ATP World Series; Clay – $305,000 – 32S/16D; Singles – Doubles	(Czechoslovakia) Vojtěch Flégl (Czechoslovakia) Cyril Suk; 6–4, 6–2	(Belgium) Libor Pimek (Czechoslovakia) Daniel Vacek	(Argentina) Guillermo Pérez Roldán (Austria) Thomas Muster	(France) Arnaud Boetsch (Austria) Horst Skoff (Sweden) Magnus Larsson (Argentina) Horacio de la Peña
12 Aug	GTE U.S. Men's Hard Court Championships; Indianapolis, IN, US; ATP Championship Series; Hard – $825,000 – 56S/28D; Singles – Doubles	(United States) Pete Sampras; 7–6^{(7–2)}, 3–6, 6–3	(Germany) Boris Becker	(United States) David Wheaton (United States) Jim Courier	(Switzerland) Jakob Hlasek (France) Fabrice Santoro (Australia) Richard Fromberg (Soviet Union) Andrei Cherkasov
12 Aug	GTE U.S. Men's Hard Court Championships; Indianapolis, IN, US; ATP Championship Series; Hard – $825,000 – 56S/28D; Singles – Doubles	(United States) Ken Flach (United States) Robert Seguso; 6–4, 6–3	(United States) Kent Kinnear (United States) Sven Salumaa	(United States) David Wheaton (United States) Jim Courier	(Switzerland) Jakob Hlasek (France) Fabrice Santoro (Australia) Richard Fromberg (Soviet Union) Andrei Cherkasov
12 Aug	Volvo International; New Haven, CT, US; ATP Championship Series; Hard – $825,000 – 56S/28D; Singles – Doubles	(Czechoslovakia) Petr Korda; 6–4, 6–2	(Croatia) Goran Ivanišević	(United States) Derrick Rostagno (Switzerland) Marc Rosset	(Netherlands) Richard Krajicek (United States) John McEnroe (Italy) Omar Camporese (United States) Michael Chang
12 Aug	Volvo International; New Haven, CT, US; ATP Championship Series; Hard – $825,000 – 56S/28D; Singles – Doubles	(Czechoslovakia) Petr Korda (Australia) Wally Masur; Walkover	(United States) Jeff Brown (United States) Scott Melville	(United States) Derrick Rostagno (Switzerland) Marc Rosset	(Netherlands) Richard Krajicek (United States) John McEnroe (Italy) Omar Camporese (United States) Michael Chang
19 Aug	Norstar Bank Hamlet Challenge Cup; Long Island, NY, US; ATP World Series; Hard – $225,000 – 32S/16D; Singles – Doubles	(Czechoslovakia) Ivan Lendl; 6–3, 6–2	(Sweden) Stefan Edberg	(France) Olivier Delaître (United States) John McEnroe	(United States) Jimmy Connors (France) Thierry Champion (Brazil) Luiz Mattar (Italy) Omar Camporese
19 Aug	Norstar Bank Hamlet Challenge Cup; Long Island, NY, US; ATP World Series; Hard – $225,000 – 32S/16D; Singles – Doubles	(Germany) Eric Jelen (Germany) Carl-Uwe Steeb; 0–6, 6–4, 7–6	(United States) Doug Flach (Italy) Diego Nargiso	(France) Olivier Delaître (United States) John McEnroe	(United States) Jimmy Connors (France) Thierry Champion (Brazil) Luiz Mattar (Italy) Omar Camporese
19 Aug	OTB International; Schenectady, NY, US; ATP World Series; Hard – $125,000 – 32S/16D; Singles – Doubles	(Germany) Michael Stich; 6–2, 6–4	(Spain) Emilio Sánchez	(Austria) Horst Skoff (Spain) Francisco Clavet	(Australia) Todd Woodbridge (Soviet Union) Andrei Cherkasov (Soviet Union) Alexander Volkov (Spain) Sergi Bruguera
19 Aug	OTB International; Schenectady, NY, US; ATP World Series; Hard – $125,000 – 32S/16D; Singles – Doubles	(Spain) Javier Sánchez (Australia) Todd Woodbridge; 3–6, 7–6, 7–6	(Ecuador) Andrés Gómez (Spain) Emilio Sánchez	(Austria) Horst Skoff (Spain) Francisco Clavet	(Australia) Todd Woodbridge (Soviet Union) Andrei Cherkasov (Soviet Union) Alexander Volkov (Spain) Sergi Bruguera
26 Aug; 2 Sept	US Open; New York, US; Grand Slam; Hard – $3,099,300 – 128S/64D/32XD; Singles – Doubles – Mixed doubles	(Sweden) Stefan Edberg; 6–2, 6–4, 6–0	(United States) Jim Courier	(United States) Jimmy Connors (Czechoslovakia) Ivan Lendl	(Netherlands) Paul Haarhuis (United States) Pete Sampras (Germany) Michael Stich (Spain) Javier Sánchez
26 Aug; 2 Sept	US Open; New York, US; Grand Slam; Hard – $3,099,300 – 128S/64D/32XD; Singles – Doubles – Mixed doubles	(Australia) John Fitzgerald (Sweden) Anders Järryd; 6–3, 3–6, 6–3, 6–3	(United States) Scott Davis (United States) David Pate	(United States) Jimmy Connors (Czechoslovakia) Ivan Lendl	(Netherlands) Paul Haarhuis (United States) Pete Sampras (Germany) Michael Stich (Spain) Javier Sánchez
26 Aug; 2 Sept	US Open; New York, US; Grand Slam; Hard – $3,099,300 – 128S/64D/32XD; Singles – Doubles – Mixed doubles	(Netherlands) Manon Bollegraf (Netherlands) Tom Nijssen; 6–2, 7–6^{(7–2)}	(Spain) Arantxa Sánchez Vicario (Spain) Emilio Sánchez	(United States) Jimmy Connors (Czechoslovakia) Ivan Lendl	(Netherlands) Paul Haarhuis (United States) Pete Sampras (Germany) Michael Stich (Spain) Javier Sánchez

=== September ===
Week	Tournament	Champions	Runners-up	Semifinalists	Quarterfinalists
9 Sep	Grand Prix de Passing Shot; Bordeaux, France; ATP World Series; Hard – $270,000 – 32S/16D	(France) Guy Forget; 6–1, 6–3	(France) Olivier Delaître	(France) Cédric Pioline (France) Thierry Champion	(Sweden) Lars Jonsson (France) Fabrice Santoro (France) Arnaud Boetsch (Germany) Alexander Mronz
9 Sep	Grand Prix de Passing Shot; Bordeaux, France; ATP World Series; Hard – $270,000 – 32S/16D	(France) Arnaud Boetsch (France) Guy Forget; 6–2, 6–2	(Germany) Patrik Kühnen (Germany) Alexander Mronz	(France) Cédric Pioline (France) Thierry Champion	(Sweden) Lars Jonsson (France) Fabrice Santoro (France) Arnaud Boetsch (Germany) Alexander Mronz
9 Sep	Brasília Open; Brasília, Brazil; ATP World Series; Carpet – $225,000 – 48S/16D	(Ecuador) Andrés Gómez; 6–4, 3–6, 6–3	(Spain) Javier Sánchez	(United States) Bryan Shelton (Brazil) Danilo Marcelino	(Australia) Sandon Stolle (United States) Todd Martin (Argentina) Martín Jaite (United States) Francisco Montana
9 Sep	Brasília Open; Brasília, Brazil; ATP World Series; Carpet – $225,000 – 48S/16D	(United States) Kent Kinnear (The Bahamas) Roger Smith; 6–2, 3–6, 7–6	(Brazil) Ricardo Acioly (Brazil) Mauro Menezes	(United States) Bryan Shelton (Brazil) Danilo Marcelino	(Australia) Sandon Stolle (United States) Todd Martin (Argentina) Martín Jaite (United States) Francisco Montana
9 Sep	Barclay Open; Geneva, Switzerland; ATP World Series; Clay – $225,000 – 32S/16D; Singles – Doubles	(Austria) Thomas Muster; 6–2, 6–4	(Austria) Horst Skoff	(Soviet Union) Andrei Medvedev (Spain) Jordi Arrese	(Spain) Sergi Bruguera (Argentina) Christian Miniussi (Argentina) Horacio de la Peña (Brazil) Jaime Oncins
9 Sep	Barclay Open; Geneva, Switzerland; ATP World Series; Clay – $225,000 – 32S/16D; Singles – Doubles	(Spain) Sergi Bruguera (Switzerland) Marc Rosset; 3–6, 6–3, 6–2	(Sweden) Per Henricsson (Sweden) Ola Jonsson	(Soviet Union) Andrei Medvedev (Spain) Jordi Arrese	(Spain) Sergi Bruguera (Argentina) Christian Miniussi (Argentina) Horacio de la Peña (Brazil) Jaime Oncins
16 Sep	Davis Cup by NEC Semifinals; Kansas City, MO, US – clay (i); Pau, France – carpet	Semifinal winners United States 3–2; France 5–0	Semifinal losers Germany; Yugoslavia		
23 Sep	Swiss Indoors; Basel, Switzerland; ATP World Series; Hard (i) – $675,000 – 32S/16D; Singles – Doubles	(Switzerland) Jakob Hlasek; 7–6^{(7–4)}, 6–0, 6–3	(United States) John McEnroe	(United States) Jimmy Connors (Soviet Union) Alexander Volkov	(Sweden) Christian Bergström (Israel) Amos Mansdorf (United States) Kevin Curren (Czechoslovakia) Karel Nováček
23 Sep	Swiss Indoors; Basel, Switzerland; ATP World Series; Hard (i) – $675,000 – 32S/16D; Singles – Doubles	(Switzerland) Jakob Hlasek (United States) Patrick McEnroe; 3–6, 7–6, 7–6	(Czechoslovakia) Petr Korda (United States) John McEnroe	(United States) Jimmy Connors (Soviet Union) Alexander Volkov	(Sweden) Christian Bergström (Israel) Amos Mansdorf (United States) Kevin Curren (Czechoslovakia) Karel Nováček
23 Sep	Campionati Internazionali di Sicilia; Palermo, Italy; ATP World Series; Clay – $270,000 – 32S/16D; Singles – Doubles	(France) Frédéric Fontang; 1–6, 6–3, 6–3	(Spain) Emilio Sánchez	(Czechoslovakia) Marián Vajda (Spain) Jordi Arrese	(Austria) Thomas Muster (Italy) Diego Nargiso (France) Yannick Noah (Italy) Massimo Cierro
23 Sep	Campionati Internazionali di Sicilia; Palermo, Italy; ATP World Series; Clay – $270,000 – 32S/16D; Singles – Doubles	(Netherlands) Jacco Eltingh (Netherlands) Tom Kempers; 3–6, 6–3, 6–3	(Spain) Emilio Sánchez (Spain) Javier Sánchez	(Czechoslovakia) Marián Vajda (Spain) Jordi Arrese	(Austria) Thomas Muster (Italy) Diego Nargiso (France) Yannick Noah (Italy) Massimo Cierro
23 Sep	Queensland Open; Brisbane, Australia; ATP World Series; Hard – $225,000 – 32S/16D	(Italy) Gianluca Pozzi; 6–3, 7–6^{(7–4)}	(United States) Aaron Krickstein	(Australia) Jason Stoltenberg (Soviet Union) Andrei Chesnokov	(United States) Brad Gilbert (United States) Jim Grabb (South Africa) Wayne Ferreira (Australia) Richard Fromberg
23 Sep	Queensland Open; Brisbane, Australia; ATP World Series; Hard – $225,000 – 32S/16D	(Australia) Todd Woodbridge (Australia) Mark Woodforde; 7–6, 6–3	(Australia) John Fitzgerald (Canada) Glenn Michibata	(Australia) Jason Stoltenberg (Soviet Union) Andrei Chesnokov	(United States) Brad Gilbert (United States) Jim Grabb (South Africa) Wayne Ferreira (Australia) Richard Fromberg
30 Sep	Australian Indoor Championships; Sydney, Australia; ATP Championship Series; Hard (i) – $750,000 – 48S/24D; Singles – Doubles	(Sweden) Stefan Edberg; 6–2, 6–2, 6–2	(United States) Brad Gilbert	(Croatia) Goran Ivanišević (United States) Pete Sampras	(United States) Michael Chang (United States) Andre Agassi (United States) David Wheaton (South Africa) Wayne Ferreira
30 Sep	Australian Indoor Championships; Sydney, Australia; ATP Championship Series; Hard (i) – $750,000 – 48S/24D; Singles – Doubles	(United States) Jim Grabb (United States) Richey Reneberg; 6–2, 6–3	(United States) Luke Jensen (Australia) Laurie Warder	(Croatia) Goran Ivanišević (United States) Pete Sampras	(United States) Michael Chang (United States) Andre Agassi (United States) David Wheaton (South Africa) Wayne Ferreira
30 Sep	Grand Prix de Tennis de Toulouse; Toulouse, France; ATP World Series; Hard (i) – $260,000 – 32S/16D; Singles – Doubles	(France) Guy Forget; 6–2, 7–6^{(7–4)}	(Israel) Amos Mansdorf	(Netherlands) Richard Krajicek (Soviet Union) Alexander Volkov	(Switzerland) Marc Rosset (United States) John McEnroe (France) Cédric Pioline (Sweden) Christian Bergström
30 Sep	Grand Prix de Tennis de Toulouse; Toulouse, France; ATP World Series; Hard (i) – $260,000 – 32S/16D; Singles – Doubles	(Netherlands) Tom Nijssen (Czechoslovakia) Cyril Suk; 4–6, 6–3, 7–6	(United Kingdom) Jeremy Bates (United States) Kevin Curren	(Netherlands) Richard Krajicek (Soviet Union) Alexander Volkov	(Switzerland) Marc Rosset (United States) John McEnroe (France) Cédric Pioline (Sweden) Christian Bergström
30 Sep	Athens Open; Athens, Greece; ATP World Series; Clay – $125,000 – 32S/16D; Singles – Doubles	(Spain) Sergi Bruguera; 7–5, 6–3	(Spain) Jordi Arrese	(Austria) Thomas Muster (Spain) Francisco Clavet	(Italy) Renzo Furlan (Argentina) Guillermo Pérez Roldán (Sweden) Lars Jonsson (Netherlands) Mark Koevermans
30 Sep	Athens Open; Athens, Greece; ATP World Series; Clay – $125,000 – 32S/16D; Singles – Doubles	(Netherlands) Jacco Eltingh (Netherlands) Mark Koevermans; 5–7, 7–6, 7–5	(Netherlands) Menno Oosting (Finland) Olli Rahnasto	(Austria) Thomas Muster (Spain) Francisco Clavet	(Italy) Renzo Furlan (Argentina) Guillermo Pérez Roldán (Sweden) Lars Jonsson (Netherlands) Mark Koevermans

=== October ===
Week	Tournament	Champions	Runners-up	Semifinalists	Quarterfinalists
7 Oct	Seiko Super Tennis Tournament; Tokyo, Japan; ATP Championship Series; Carpet (i) – $750,000 – 48S/24D; Singles – Doubles	(Sweden) Stefan Edberg; 6–3, 1–6, 6–2	(United States) Derrick Rostagno	(Croatia) Goran Ivanišević (Czechoslovakia) Ivan Lendl	(United States) Michael Chang (United States) Andre Agassi (United States) David Wheaton (Germany) Boris Becker
7 Oct	Seiko Super Tennis Tournament; Tokyo, Japan; ATP Championship Series; Carpet (i) – $750,000 – 48S/24D; Singles – Doubles	(United States) Jim Grabb (United States) Richey Reneberg; 6–3, 6–7, 6–2	(United States) Scott Davis (United States) David Pate	(Croatia) Goran Ivanišević (Czechoslovakia) Ivan Lendl	(United States) Michael Chang (United States) Andre Agassi (United States) David Wheaton (Germany) Boris Becker
7 Oct	Holsten International; Berlin, Germany; ATP World Series; Carpet (i) – $260,000 – 32S/16D; Singles – Doubles	(Czechoslovakia) Petr Korda; 6–3, 6–4	(France) Arnaud Boetsch	(Sweden) Anders Järryd (Germany) Patrik Kühnen	(Germany) Michael Stich (Soviet Union) Alexander Volkov (France) Jean-Philippe Fleurian (France) Cédric Pioline
7 Oct	Holsten International; Berlin, Germany; ATP World Series; Carpet (i) – $260,000 – 32S/16D; Singles – Doubles	(Czechoslovakia) Petr Korda (Czechoslovakia) Karel Nováček; 3–6, 7–5, 7–5	(Netherlands) Jan Siemerink (Czechoslovakia) Daniel Vacek	(Sweden) Anders Järryd (Germany) Patrik Kühnen	(Germany) Michael Stich (Soviet Union) Alexander Volkov (France) Jean-Philippe Fleurian (France) Cédric Pioline
7 Oct	Riklis Classic; Tel Aviv, Israel; ATP World Series; Hard – $125,000 – 32S/16D; Singles – Doubles	(Mexico) Leonardo Lavalle; 6–2, 3–6, 6–3	(South Africa) Christo van Rensburg	(United States) Bryan Shelton (Israel) Gilad Bloom	(Soviet Union) Andrei Cherkasov (Sweden) Peter Nyborg (France) Olivier Delaître (Sweden) Johan Carlsson
7 Oct	Riklis Classic; Tel Aviv, Israel; ATP World Series; Hard – $125,000 – 32S/16D; Singles – Doubles	(Czechoslovakia) David Rikl (Netherlands) Michiel Schapers; 6–2, 6–7, 6–3	(Argentina) Javier Frana (Mexico) Leonardo Lavalle	(United States) Bryan Shelton (Israel) Gilad Bloom	(Soviet Union) Andrei Cherkasov (Sweden) Peter Nyborg (France) Olivier Delaître (Sweden) Johan Carlsson
14 Oct	Grand Prix de Tennis de Lyon; Lyon, France; ATP World Series; Carpet (i) – $450,000 – 32S/16D; Singles – Doubles	(United States) Pete Sampras; 6–1, 6–1	(France) Olivier Delaître	(Spain) Sergi Bruguera (United States) Brad Gilbert	(United States) Johan Kriek (United States) Kevin Curren (Argentina) Alberto Mancini (Sweden) Jonas Svensson
14 Oct	Grand Prix de Tennis de Lyon; Lyon, France; ATP World Series; Carpet (i) – $450,000 – 32S/16D; Singles – Doubles	(Netherlands) Tom Nijssen (Czechoslovakia) Cyril Suk; 7–6, 6–3	(United States) Steve DeVries (Australia) David Macpherson	(Spain) Sergi Bruguera (United States) Brad Gilbert	(United States) Johan Kriek (United States) Kevin Curren (Argentina) Alberto Mancini (Sweden) Jonas Svensson
14 Oct	CA-TennisTrophy; Vienna, Austria; ATP World Series; Carpet (i) – $225,000 – 32S/16D; Singles – Doubles	(Germany) Michael Stich; 6–4, 6–4, 6–4	(Netherlands) Jan Siemerink	(Czechoslovakia) Petr Korda (Germany) Carl-Uwe Steeb	(Sweden) Anders Järryd (United States) Aaron Krickstein (Argentina) Javier Frana (Austria) Horst Skoff
14 Oct	CA-TennisTrophy; Vienna, Austria; ATP World Series; Carpet (i) – $225,000 – 32S/16D; Singles – Doubles	(Sweden) Anders Järryd (South Africa) Gary Muller; 6–4, 7–5	(Switzerland) Jakob Hlasek (United States) Patrick McEnroe	(Czechoslovakia) Petr Korda (Germany) Carl-Uwe Steeb	(Sweden) Anders Järryd (United States) Aaron Krickstein (Argentina) Javier Frana (Austria) Horst Skoff
21 Oct	Stockholm Open; Stockholm, Sweden; ATP Championship Series, Single-Week; Carpet (i) – $840,000 – 48S/24D; Singles – Doubles	(Germany) Boris Becker; 3–6, 6–4, 1–6, 6–2, 6–2	(Sweden) Stefan Edberg	(United States) Aaron Krickstein (United States) Jim Courier	(United States) Richey Reneberg (Croatia) Goran Ivanišević (Czechoslovakia) Petr Korda (United States) Pete Sampras
21 Oct	Stockholm Open; Stockholm, Sweden; ATP Championship Series, Single-Week; Carpet (i) – $840,000 – 48S/24D; Singles – Doubles	(Australia) John Fitzgerald (Sweden) Anders Järryd; 7–5, 6–3	(Netherlands) Tom Nijssen (Czechoslovakia) Cyril Suk	(United States) Aaron Krickstein (United States) Jim Courier	(United States) Richey Reneberg (Croatia) Goran Ivanišević (Czechoslovakia) Petr Korda (United States) Pete Sampras
21 Oct	Bliss Cup; Guarujá, Brazil; ATP World Series; Hard – $125,000 – 32S/16D; Singles – Doubles	(Argentina) Javier Frana; 2–6, 7–6^{(7–1)}, 6–3	(Germany) Markus Zoecke	(Spain) Francisco Roig (Spain) Carlos Costa	(Belgium) Bart Wuyts (Venezuela) Maurice Ruah (Ecuador) Andrés Gómez (Spain) Germán López
21 Oct	Bliss Cup; Guarujá, Brazil; ATP World Series; Hard – $125,000 – 32S/16D; Singles – Doubles	(Netherlands) Jacco Eltingh (Netherlands) Paul Haarhuis; 6–3, 7–5	(United States) Bret Garnett (United States) Todd Nelson	(Spain) Francisco Roig (Spain) Carlos Costa	(Belgium) Bart Wuyts (Venezuela) Maurice Ruah (Ecuador) Andrés Gómez (Spain) Germán López
28 Oct	Paris Open; Paris, France; ATP Championship Series, Single-Week; Carpet (i) – $1,650,000 – 48S/24D; Singles – Doubles	(France) Guy Forget; 7–6^{(11–9)}, 4–6, 5–7, 6–4, 6–4	(United States) Pete Sampras	(United States) Michael Chang (Sweden) Jonas Svensson	(Czechoslovakia) Petr Korda (Soviet Union) Alexander Volkov (Italy) Omar Camporese (Czechoslovakia) Karel Nováček
28 Oct	Paris Open; Paris, France; ATP Championship Series, Single-Week; Carpet (i) – $1,650,000 – 48S/24D; Singles – Doubles	(Australia) John Fitzgerald (Sweden) Anders Järryd; 7–6, 6–4	(United States) Kelly Jones (United States) Rick Leach	(United States) Michael Chang (Sweden) Jonas Svensson	(Czechoslovakia) Petr Korda (Soviet Union) Alexander Volkov (Italy) Omar Camporese (Czechoslovakia) Karel Nováček
28 Oct	Kolynos Cup; Búzios, Brazil; ATP World Series; Hard – $147,500 – 32S/16D; Singles – Doubles	(Spain) Jordi Arrese; 1–6, 6–4, 6–0	(Brazil) Jaime Oncins	(Spain) Francisco Roig (Spain) Javier Sánchez	(Germany) Markus Zoecke (Austria) Thomas Muster (Spain) Francisco Clavet (Argentina) Guillermo Pérez Roldán
28 Oct	Kolynos Cup; Búzios, Brazil; ATP World Series; Hard – $147,500 – 32S/16D; Singles – Doubles	(Spain) Sergio Casal (Spain) Emilio Sánchez; 4–6, 6–3, 6–4	(Argentina) Javier Frana (Mexico) Leonardo Lavalle	(Spain) Francisco Roig (Spain) Javier Sánchez	(Germany) Markus Zoecke (Austria) Thomas Muster (Spain) Francisco Clavet (Argentina) Guillermo Pérez Roldán

=== November ===
Week	Tournament	Champions	Runners-up	Semifinalists	Quarterfinalists
4 Nov	Diet Pepsi Challenge; Birmingham, Great Britain; ATP World Series; Carpet (i) – $450,000 – 32S/16D	(United States) Michael Chang; 6–3, 6–2	(France) Guillaume Raoux	(United States) Richey Reneberg (France) Thierry Champion	(Haiti) Ronald Agénor (South Africa) Wayne Ferreira (United States) MaliVai Washington (Netherlands) Tom Nijssen
4 Nov	Diet Pepsi Challenge; Birmingham, Great Britain; ATP World Series; Carpet (i) – $450,000 – 32S/16D	(Netherlands) Jacco Eltingh (Kenya) Paul Wekesa; 7–5, 7–5	(Sweden) Ronnie Båthman (Sweden) Rikard Bergh	(United States) Richey Reneberg (France) Thierry Champion	(Haiti) Ronald Agénor (South Africa) Wayne Ferreira (United States) MaliVai Washington (Netherlands) Tom Nijssen
4 Nov	Bayer Kremlin Cup; Moscow, Soviet Union; ATP World Series; Carpet (i) – $297,000 – 32S/16D; Singles – Doubles	(Soviet Union) Andrei Cherkasov; 7–6^{(7–2)}, 3–6, 7–6^{(7–5)}	(Switzerland) Jakob Hlasek	(Spain) Marcos Aurelio Gorriz (Soviet Union) Alexander Volkov	(Germany) Carl-Uwe Steeb (Switzerland) Marc Rosset (Netherlands) Jan Siemerink (United States) Jim Grabb
4 Nov	Bayer Kremlin Cup; Moscow, Soviet Union; ATP World Series; Carpet (i) – $297,000 – 32S/16D; Singles – Doubles	(Germany) Eric Jelen (Germany) Carl-Uwe Steeb; 6–4, 7–6	(Soviet Union) Andrei Cherkasov (Soviet Union) Alexander Volkov	(Spain) Marcos Aurelio Gorriz (Soviet Union) Alexander Volkov	(Germany) Carl-Uwe Steeb (Switzerland) Marc Rosset (Netherlands) Jan Siemerink (United States) Jim Grabb
4 Nov	Banespa Open; São Paulo, Brazil; ATP World Series; Hard – $225,000 – 32S/16D	(Argentina) Christian Miniussi; 2–6, 6–3, 6–4	(Brazil) Jaime Oncins	(Spain) Francisco Clavet (Ecuador) Andrés Gómez	(Belgium) Eduardo Masso (Brazil) Danilo Marcelino (Argentina) Gabriel Markus (Chile) Felipe Rivera
4 Nov	Banespa Open; São Paulo, Brazil; ATP World Series; Hard – $225,000 – 32S/16D	(Ecuador) Andrés Gómez (Brazil) Jaime Oncins; 6–4, 6–4	(Mexico) Jorge Lozano (Brazil) Cássio Motta	(Spain) Francisco Clavet (Ecuador) Andrés Gómez	(Belgium) Eduardo Masso (Brazil) Danilo Marcelino (Argentina) Gabriel Markus (Chile) Felipe Rivera
11 Nov	ATP Tour World Championships (singles); Frankfurt, Germany; ATP Tour World Championships; Carpet (i) – $2,250,000 – 8S (RR); Singles	(United States) Pete Sampras; 3–6, 7–6^{(7–5)}, 6–3, 6–4	(United States) Jim Courier	(Czechoslovakia) Ivan Lendl (United States) Andre Agassi	Round Robin (France) Guy Forget (Czechoslovakia) Karel Nováček (Germany) Boris Becker (Germany) Michael Stich
18 Nov	ATP Tour World Championships (doubles); Johannesburg, South Africa; ATP Tour World Championships; Hard (i) – $1,010,000 – 8D (RR); Doubles	(Australia) John Fitzgerald (Sweden) Anders Järryd; 6–4, 6–4, 2–6, 6–4	(United States) Ken Flach (United States) Robert Seguso	(Australia) Todd Woodbridge / (Australia) Mark Woodforde (Canada) Grant Connell / (Canada) Glenn Michibata	
25 Nov	Davis Cup by NEC Final; Lyon, France – carpet	France; 3–1	United States		

=== December ===
Week	Tournament	Champions	Runners-up	Semifinalists	Quarterfinalists
9 Dec	Grand Slam Cup; Munich, Germany; Grand Slam Cup; Carpet (i)	(United States) David Wheaton; 7–5, 6–2, 6–4	(United States) Michael Chang	(Germany) Michael Stich (Czech Republic) Ivan Lendl	(Australia) Todd Woodbridge (France) Guy Forget (Switzerland) Jakob Hlasek (United States) Patrick McEnroe

== ATP rankings ==
As of 7 January 1991
Rk	Name	Nation	Points
1	Stefan Edberg	SWE	3889
2	Boris Becker	GER	3528
3	Ivan Lendl	TCH	2581
4	Andre Agassi	USA	2398
5	Pete Sampras	USA	1888
6	Andrés Gómez	ECU	1680
7	Thomas Muster	AUT	1551
8	Goran Ivanišević	YUG	1514
9	Emilio Sánchez	ESP	1487
10	Brad Gilbert	USA	1451
11	Jonas Svensson	SWE	1365
12	Andrei Chesnokov	URS	1353
13	John McEnroe	USA	1210
14	Guillermo Pérez Roldán	ARG	1190
15	Michael Chang	USA	1119
16	Guy Forget	FRA	1101
17	Jakob Hlasek	SUI	1089
18	Jay Berger	USA	1066
19	Juan Aguilera	ESP	1042
20	Aaron Krickstein	USA	1025

Year-end rankings 1991 (30 December 1991)
Rk	Name	Nation	Points	High	Low	Change
1	Stefan Edberg	SWE	3515	1	2	Steady
2	Jim Courier	USA	3205	2	26	▲21
3	Boris Becker	GER	2822	1	3	▼1
4	Michael Stich	GER	2675	3	38	▲34
5	Ivan Lendl	TCH	2565	3	5	▼2
6	Pete Sampras	USA	2492	5	9	▼1
7	Guy Forget	FRA	2392	4	16	▲9
8	Karel Nováček	TCH	1599	8	35	▲27
9	Petr Korda	TCH	1570	9	87	▲30
10	Andre Agassi	USA	1519	4	10	▼6
11	Sergi Bruguera	ESP	1504	5	31	▲20
12	Magnus Gustafsson	SWE	1462	10	39	▲20
13	Derrick Rostagno	USA	1392	13	49	▲36
14	Emilio Sánchez	ESP	1388	8	16	▼5
15	Michael Chang	USA	1363	9	28	Steady
16	Goran Ivanišević	CRO	1355	7	19	▼8
17	David Wheaton	USA	1289	12	46	▲9
18	Goran Prpić	CRO	1178	16	57	▲39
19	Brad Gilbert	USA	1129	7	25	▼9
20	Jakob Hlasek	SUI	1109	14	22	▼3

== Statistical information ==
List of players and singles titles won, alphabetically by last name:

- (United States) Andre Agassi – Orlando, Washington, D.C. (2)
- (Spain) Jordi Arrese – Madrid, Búzios (2)
- (Germany) Patrick Baur – Guarujá, Seoul (2)
- (Germany) Boris Becker – Australian Open, Stockholm Masters (2)
- (Spain) Sergi Bruguera – Estoril, Monte Carlo Masters, Athens (3)
- (Australia) Darren Cahill – San Francisco (1)
- (Italy) Paolo Canè – Bologna (1)
- (Italy) Omar Camporese – Rotterdam (1)
- (United States) Michael Chang – Birmingham (1)
- (Russia) Andrei Cherkasov – Moscow (1)
- (Russia) Andrei Chesnokov – Canada Masters (1)
- (United States) Jim Courier – Indian Wells Masters, Miami Masters, French Open (3)
- (Sweden) Stefan Edberg – Stuttgart, Tokyo, London, US Open, Sydney Indoors, Tokyo Indoors (6)
- (France) Frédéric Fontang – Palermo (1)
- (France) Guy Forget – Sydney, Brussels, Cincinnati Masters, Bordeaux, Toulouse, Paris Masters (6)
- (Argentina) Javier Frana – Guarujá (1)
- (Australia) Richard Fromberg – Wellington (1)
- (Ecuador) Andrés Gómez – Brasília (1)
- (Sweden) Magnus Gustafsson – Munich, Båstad, Hilversum (3)
- (Switzerland) Jakob Hlasek – Basel (1)
- (Croatia) Goran Ivanišević – Manchester (1)
- (Argentina) Martín Jaite – Nice (1)
- (Czechoslovakia) Petr Korda – New Haven, Berlin (2)
- (Netherlands) Richard Krajicek – Hong Kong (1)
- (Sweden) Nicklas Kulti – Adelaide (1)
- (Mexico) Leonardo Lavalle – Tel Aviv (1)
- (Czechoslovakia) Ivan Lendl – Philadelphia, Memphis, Long Island (3)
- (United States) John McEnroe – Chicago (1)
- (Argentina) Christian Miniussi – São Paulo (1)
- (Austria) Thomas Muster – Florence, Geneva (2)
- (Czechoslovakia) Karel Nováček – Auckland, Hamburg Masters, Kitzbühel, Prague (4)
- (Argentina) Guillermo Pérez Roldán – San Marino (1)
- (Ukraine) Dimitri Poliakov – Umag (1)
- (Italy) Gianluca Pozzi – Brisbane (1)
- (United States) Richey Reneberg – Tampa (1)
- (Germany) Christian Saceanu – Rosmalen (1)
- (United States) Pete Sampras – Los Angeles, Indianapolis, Lyon, Season-Ending Championships (4)
- (Spain) Emilio Sánchez – Barcelona, Rome Masters, Gstaad (3)
- (United States) Bryan Shelton – Newport (1)
- (Netherlands) Jan Siemerink – Singapore (1)
- (Germany) Carl-Uwe Steeb – Genova (1)
- (Germany) Michael Stich – Wimbledon, Stuttgart, Schenectady, Vienna (4)
- (Sweden) Jonas Svensson – Copenhagen (1)
- (Russia) Alexander Volkov – Milan (1)
- (Peru) Jaime Yzaga – Charlotte (1)

The following players won their first title:

- (Germany) Patrick Baur
- (Spain) Sergi Bruguera
- (Italy) Omar Camporese
- (France) Frédéric Fontang
- (Argentina) Javier Frana
- (Sweden) Magnus Gustafsson
- (Czechoslovakia) Petr Korda
- (Netherlands) Richard Krajicek
- (Mexico) Leonardo Lavalle
- (Argentina) Christian Miniussi
- (Soviet Union) Dimitri Poliakov
- (Italy) Gianluca Pozzi
- (United States) Richey Reneberg
- (United States) Bryan Shelton
- (Netherlands) Jan Siemerink
- (Soviet Union) Alexander Volkov

== See also ==
- 1991 WTA Tour
