= 1991 Chevrolet Classic =

- Date: 4–11 February
- Edition: 6th
- Category: ATP World Series
- Draw: 32S / 16D
- Surface: Hard / outdoor
- Location: Guarujá, Brazil
- Venue: Hotel Jequitimar

Champions

Singles
- (Germany) Patrick Baur

Doubles
- (France) Olivier Delaître / (France) Rodolphe Gilbert
← 1990 ·	Chevrolet Classic

The 1991 Chevrolet Classic was a men's tennis tournament held in Guarujá in Brazil and played on outdoor hardcourt. It was part of the World Series category of the 1991 ATP Tour. It was the sixth edition of the tournament and took place from 4 February through 11 February 1991. Unseeded Patrick Baur won the singles title.

== Finals ==
=== Singles ===
(Germany) Patrick Baur defeated (Brazil) Fernando Roese 6–2, 6–3

- It was Baur's 1st singles title of his career.

=== Doubles ===
(France) Olivier Delaître / (France) Rodolphe Gilbert defeated (United States) Shelby Cannon / (United States) Greg Van Emburgh 6–2, 6–4

- It was Delaître's 1st title of the year and the 1st of his career. It was Gilbert's only title of the year and the 1st of his career.

== See also ==
- 1991 Bliss Cup - tennis tournament in Guarujá
