= 1991 Bliss Cup – Doubles =

Doubles
- 1991 Bliss Cup

Final
- Champions: (Netherlands) Jacco Eltingh (Netherlands) Paul Haarhuis
- Runners-up: (United States) Bret Garnett (United States) Todd Nelson
- Score: 6–3, 7–5

Details
- Draw: 16
- Seeds: 4

Events
| Singles | Doubles |
| ← 1991 · | Guarujá Open |

This was the second tournament held in 1991 at the city of Guarujá. Olivier Delaître and Rodolphe Gilbert were the champions in February. None competed this month.

Jacco Eltingh and Paul Haarhuis won the title by defeating Bret Garnett and Todd Nelson 6–3, 7–5 in the final.

== Seeds ==
1. (Spain) Sergio Casal / (Spain) Javier Sánchez (quarterfinals)
2. (Argentina) Javier Frana / (Mexico) Jorge Lozano (quarterfinals)
3. (Netherlands) Jacco Eltingh / (Netherlands) Paul Haarhuis (champions)
4. (Brazil) Luiz Mattar / (Venezuela) Nicolás Pereira (first round)

== Draw ==
=== Key ===
- Q = Qualifier
- WC = Wild card
- LL = Lucky loser
- Alt = Alternate
- SE = Special exempt
- PR = Protected ranking
- ITF = ITF entry
- JE = Junior exempt
- w/o = Walkover
- r = Retired
- d = Defaulted
- SR = Special ranking

First Round
1 | (Spain) S Casal (Spain) J Sánchez | 7 | 6
(Spain) F Clavet (Spain) C Costa | 5 | 2
(Brazil) R Acioly (Brazil) M Menezes | 6 | 7
WC | (Brazil) R Camargo (Brazil) J Daher | 3 | 6
4 | (Brazil) L Mattar (Venezuela) N Pereira | 6 | 4
(Brazil) D Marcelino (Brazil) C Motta | 7 | 6
(United States) B Garnett (United States) T Nelson | 5 | 7 | 6
(Argentina) D Orsanic (Spain) F Roig | 7 | 6 | 3
(United States) F Montana (United States) G Van Emburgh | 7 | 6
(United States) S Cannon (The Bahamas) R Smith | 6 | 4
(Argentina) P Albano (Argentina) G Luza | 3 | 6
3 | (Netherlands) J Eltingh (Netherlands) P Haarhuis | 6 | 7
(Ecuador) A Gómez (Brazil) J Oncins | 6 | 3 | 6
(Peru) P Arraya (Venezuela) A Mora | 1 | 6 | 3
(Brazil) N Aerts (Brazil) F Roese | 4 | 4
2 | (Argentina) J Frana (Mexico) J Lozano | 6 | 6

Quarterfinals
1 | (Spain) S Casal (Spain) J Sánchez | 3 | 6 | 4
(Brazil) R Acioly (Brazil) M Menezes | 6 | 1 | 6
(Brazil) D Marcelino (Brazil) C Motta | 4 | 5
(United States) B Garnett (United States) T Nelson | 6 | 7
(United States) F Montana (United States) G Van Emburgh | 6 | 1 | 2
3 | (Netherlands) J Eltingh (Netherlands) P Haarhuis | 4 | 6 | 6
(Ecuador) A Gómez (Brazil) J Oncins | 6 | 6
2 | (Argentina) J Frana (Mexico) J Lozano | 3 | 4

Semifinals
(Brazil) R Acioly (Brazil) M Menezes | 4 | 6 | 6
(United States) B Garnett (United States) T Nelson | 6 | 4 | 7
3 | (Netherlands) J Eltingh (Netherlands) P Haarhuis | 3 | 6 | 7
(Ecuador) A Gómez (Brazil) J Oncins | 6 | 2 | 6

Final
(United States) B Garnett (United States) T Nelson | 3 | 5
3 | (Netherlands) J Eltingh (Netherlands) P Haarhuis | 6 | 7
