= 1991 Chevrolet Classic – Doubles =

Doubles
- 1991 Chevrolet Classic

Final
- Champions: (France) Olivier Delaître (France) Rodolphe Gilbert
- Runners-up: (United States) Shelby Cannon (United States) Greg Van Emburgh
- Score: 6–2, 6–4

Details
- Draw: 16 (1WC)
- Seeds: 4

Events
Singles	Doubles
← 1990 ·	Guarujá Open	· 1991 →

This was the first tournament held in 1991 at the city of Guarujá. Javier Frana and Gustavo Luza were the defending champions in last year. None of them competed this year. Frana chose to rest after his appearance in the Davis Cup during the previous week.

Olivier Delaître and Rodolphe Gilbert won the title by defeating Shelby Cannon and Greg Van Emburgh 6–2, 6–4 in the final.

== Seeds ==
1. (Brazil) Nelson Aerts / (Brazil) Danilo Marcelino (quarterfinals)
2. (United States) Shelby Cannon / (United States) Greg Van Emburgh (final)
3. (Argentina) Horacio de la Peña / (Australia) Peter Doohan (quarterfinals)
4. (Argentina) Pablo Albano / (United States) Todd Nelson (quarterfinals)

== Draw ==
=== Key ===
- Q = Qualifier
- WC = Wild card
- LL = Lucky loser
- Alt = Alternate
- SE = Special exempt
- PR = Protected ranking
- ITF = ITF entry
- JE = Junior exempt
- w/o = Walkover
- r = Retired
- d = Defaulted
- SR = Special ranking

=== Draw ===
First round
1	(Brazil) N Aerts (Brazil) D Marcelino	6	7
(Spain) JF Altur (Spain) V Solves	2	5
(Uruguay) M Filippini (Uruguay) D Pérez	6	6
WC	(Brazil) A Hocevar (Brazil) M Hocevar	4	4
4	(Argentina) P Albano (United States) T Nelson	7	7
(France) T Benhabiles (Cuba) J Pino	5	6
(France) O Delaître (France) R Gilbert	3	6	6
(United States) J Letts (Venezuela) A Mora	6	3	4
(Brazil) R Acioly (Brazil) C Motta	4	3
(Netherlands) J Eltingh (Brazil) J Oncins	6	6
(Sweden) C Allgårdh (Sweden) J Carlsson	6	6	4
3	(Argentina) H de la Peña (Australia) P Doohan	4	7	6
(Italy) F Mordegan (Italy) G Pozzi	6	7
(Brazil) R Camargo (Brazil) C Kist	1	6
(Sweden) H Holm (Sweden) N Holm	6	6	1
2	(United States) S Cannon (United States) G Van Emburgh	7	3	6

Quarterfinals
1	(Brazil) N Aerts (Brazil) D Marcelino	5	4
(Uruguay) M Filippini (Uruguay) D Pérez	7	6
4	(Argentina) P Albano (United States) T Nelson	6	6
(France) O Delaître (France) R Gilbert	7	7
(Netherlands) J Eltingh (Brazil) J Oncins	6	7
3	(Argentina) H de la Peña (Australia) P Doohan	3	6
(Italy) F Mordegan (Italy) G Pozzi	6	6
2	(United States) S Cannon (United States) G Van Emburgh	7	7

Semifinals
(Uruguay) M Filippini (Uruguay) D Pérez	4	3
(France) O Delaître (France) R Gilbert	6	6
(Netherlands) J Eltingh (Brazil) J Oncins	5	6	3
2	(United States) S Cannon (United States) G Van Emburgh	7	1	6

Final
(France) O Delaître (France) R Gilbert	6	6
2	(United States) S Cannon (United States) G Van Emburgh	2	4
