= 1991 Bliss Cup =

- Date: 21–28 October
- Edition: Only
- Category: ATP World Series
- Draw: 32S / 16D
- Prize money: $ 125,000
- Surface: Hard / outdoor
- Location: Guarujá, Brazil
- Venue: Casa Grande Hotel

Champions

Singles
- (Argentina) Javier Frana

Doubles
- (Netherlands) Jacco Eltingh / (Netherlands) Paul Haarhuis
| ← 1991 · | Guarujá Open |

The 1991 Bliss Cup was a men's tennis tournament held in Guarujá in Brazil and played on outdoor hardcourt. It was part of the 1991 ATP Tour. It was the only edition of the tournament and took place from 21 October through 28 October 1991. Unseeded Javier Frana won the singles title.

== Finals ==
=== Singles ===
(Argentina) Javier Frana defeated (Germany) Markus Zoecke 2–6, 7–6^{(7–1)}, 6–3

- It was Frana's first singles title of his career.

=== Doubles ===
(Netherlands) Jacco Eltingh / (Netherlands) Paul Haarhuis defeated (United States) Bret Garnett / (United States) Todd Nelson 6–3, 7–5

- It was Eltingh's 4th title of the year and the 4th of his career. It was Haarhuis' 3rd title of the year and the 4th of his career.

== See also ==
- 1991 Chevrolet Classic - tennis tournament in Guarujá
