= 1991 Chevrolet Classic – Singles =

Singles
- 1991 Chevrolet Classic

Final
- Champion: (Germany) Patrick Baur
- Runner-up: (Brazil) Fernando Roese
- Score: 6–2, 6–3

Details
- Draw: 32 (3WC/4Q/1LL)
- Seeds: 8

Events
Singles	Doubles
← 1990 ·	Guarujá Open	· 1991 →

This was the first tournament held in 1991 at the city of Guarujá. Martín Jaite was the defending champion in last year. He did not compete this year.

Patrick Baur won the title by defeating Fernando Roese 6–2, 6–3 in the final.

== Seeds ==
1. (Brazil) Luiz Mattar (first round)
2. (Uruguay) Marcelo Filippini (first round)
3. (Argentina) Horacio de la Peña (first round)
4. (Italy) Renzo Furlan (first round)
5. (Brazil) Jaime Oncins (second round)
6. (Brazil) Cássio Motta (first round)
7. (France) Tarik Benhabiles (second round)
8. (Netherlands) Jacco Eltingh (second round)

== Draw ==
=== Key ===
- Q = Qualifier
- WC = Wild card
- LL = Lucky loser
- Alt = Alternate
- SE = Special exempt
- PR = Protected ranking
- ITF = ITF entry
- JE = Junior exempt
- w/o = Walkover
- r = Retired
- d = Defaulted
- SR = Special ranking

=== Finals ===
Semifinals
(Japan) Shuzo Matsuoka	7	3	6^{3}
(Germany) Patrick Baur	5	6	7^{7}
(Canada) Martin Wostenholme	3	4
WC	(Brazil) Fernando Roese	6	6

Final
(Germany) Patrick Baur	6	6
WC	(Brazil) Fernando Roese	2	3

=== Top half ===
First round
1	(Brazil) L Mattar	3	2
(France) R Gilbert	6	6
(Chile) P Rebolledo	3	2
(Peru) P Arraya	6	6
(Spain) JF Altur	6	3	4
(Japan) S Matsuoka	2	6	6
(United States) J Brown	4	1
8	(Netherlands) J Eltingh	6	6
4	(Italy) R Furlan	3	4
Q	(Argentina) G Markus	6	6
(Germany) P Baur	6	4	6
(France) O Delaître	3	6	2
(Uruguay) D Pérez	6	6
(France) T Tulasne	2	3
Q	(Brazil) F Meligeni	6	6
6	(Brazil) C Motta	2	4

Second round
(France) R Gilbert	6	3	6
(Peru) P Arraya	3	6	4
(Japan) S Matsuoka	6	6
8	(Netherlands) J Eltingh	4	2
Q	(Argentina) G Markus	6	6^{6}	2
(Germany) P Baur	4	7^{8}	6
(Uruguay) D Pérez	6	6
Q	(Brazil) F Meligeni	0	3

Quarterfinals
(France) R Gilbert	4	2
(Japan) S Matsuoka	6	6
(Germany) P Baur	6	7^{7}
(Uruguay) D Pérez	3	6^{3}

Semifinals
(Japan) S Matsuoka	7	3	6^{3}
(Germany) P Baur	5	6	7^{7}

=== Bottom half ===
First round
5	(Brazil) J Oncins	6	2
WC	(Brazil) M Menezes	0	2^{r}
(Sweden) H Holm	6	6^{0}	7
Q	(Italy) G Pozzi	2	7^{7}	5
(Canada) M Wostenholme	7^{7}	6
(United States) L Duncan	6^{3}	1
Q	(Argentina) P Albano	0	6	7^{7}
3	(Argentina) H de la Peña	6	4	6^{4}
7	(France) T Benhabiles	6	6
WC	(Brazil) M Saliola	4	1
(United States) C Garner	6^{6}	7	6
LL	(Sweden) C Allgårdh	7^{8}	5	4
(Sweden) J Carlsson	4	6^{4}
WC	(Brazil) F Roese	6	7^{7}
(Brazil) D Marcelino	6	6
2	(Uruguay) M Filippini	3	4

Second round
5	(Brazil) J Oncins	6	2	3
(Sweden) H Holm	4	6	6
(Canada) M Wostenholme	6	6
Q	(Argentina) P Albano	4	2
7	(France) T Benhabiles	2	6^{3}
(United States) C Garner	6	7^{7}
WC	(Brazil) F Roese	6	7^{7}
(Brazil) D Marcelino	2	6^{5}

Quarterfinals
(Sweden) H Holm	6	3	5
(Canada) M Wostenholme	0	6	7
(United States) C Garner	3	0^{r}
WC	(Brazil) F Roese	6	1

Semifinals
(Canada) M Wostenholme	3	4
WC	(Brazil) F Roese	6	6
