= 1991 Bliss Cup – Singles =

Singles
- 1991 Bliss Cup

Final
- Champion: (Argentina) Javier Frana
- Runner-up: (Germany) Markus Zoecke
- Score: 2–6, 7–6^{(7–1)}, 6–3

Details
- Draw: 32 (3WC/4Q)
- Seeds: 8

Events
Singles	Doubles
← 1991 ·	Guarujá Open

This was the second tournament held in 1991 at the city of Guarujá. Patrick Baur was the champion in February. He lost in the second round to Andrés Gómez.

Javier Frana won the title by defeating Markus Zoecke 2–6, 7–6^{(7–1)}, 6–3 in the final.

== Seeds ==
1. (Austria) Thomas Muster (first round)
2. (Spain) Jordi Arrese (second round)
3. (Spain) Javier Sánchez (first round)
4. (Netherlands) Paul Haarhuis (second round)
5. (Spain) Francisco Clavet (second round)
6. (Argentina) Guillermo Pérez Roldán (second round)
7. (France) Olivier Delaître (second round)
8. (France) Frédéric Fontang (second round)

== Draw ==
=== Key ===
- Q = Qualifier
- WC = Wild card
- LL = Lucky loser
- Alt = Alternate
- SE = Special exempt
- PR = Protected ranking
- ITF = ITF entry
- JE = Junior exempt
- w/o = Walkover
- r = Retired
- d = Defaulted
- SR = Special ranking

=== Finals ===
Semifinals
(Spain) Francisco Roig	6	3	0
(Argentina) Javier Frana	1	6	6
(Spain) Carlos Costa	4	2
(West Germany) Markus Zoecke	6	6

Final
(Argentina) Javier Frana	2	7^{7}	6
(West Germany) Markus Zoecke	6	6^{1}	3

=== Top half ===
First Round
1	(Austria) T Muster	3	2
(Brazil) L Mattar	6	6
(Japan) S Matsuoka	4	3
(Spain) F Roig	6	6
(Belgium) B Wuyts	4	5
Q	(The Bahamas) M Knowles	6	2^{r}
(Uruguay) M Filippini	7	1	4
8	(France) F Fontang	5	6	6
4	(Netherlands) P Haarhuis	6	6
(Belgium) E Masso	2	1
WC	(Brazil) C Motta	0	3
Q	(Venezuela) M Ruah	6	6
WC	(Brazil) D Marcelino	6^{2}	2
(Argentina) J Frana	7^{7}	6
(Brazil) J Oncins	4	6	6^{8}
6	(Argentina) G Pérez Roldán	6	2	7^{10}

Second Round
(Brazil) L Mattar	2	7	4
(Spain) F Roig	6	5	6
(Belgium) B Wuyts	6	6
8	(France) F Fontang	2	2
4	(Netherlands) P Haarhuis	7	4	4
Q	(Venezuela) M Ruah	5	6	6
(Argentina) J Frana	6	7^{7}
6	(Argentina) G Pérez Roldán	2	6^{1}

Quarterfinals
(Spain) F Roig	4	6	6
(Belgium) B Wuyts	6	1	4
Q	(Venezuela) M Ruah	6	4	6^{4}
(Argentina) J Frana	4	6	7^{7}

Semifinals
(Spain) F Roig	6	3	0
(Argentina) J Frana	1	6	6

=== Bottom half ===
First Round
5	(Spain) F Clavet	4	6	3
(Argentina) G Markus	6	4	0^{r}
(Spain) C Costa	7	3	6
(Mexico) L Herrera	5	6	4
(Argentina) R Azar	2	3
WC	(Ecuador) A Gómez	6	6
(West Germany) P Baur	7	6
3	(Spain) J Sánchez	5	3
7	(France) O Delaître	6	6
(Netherlands) J Eltingh	3	3
Q	(Germany) C Arriens	7^{7}	4	2
(Spain) G López	6^{4}	6	6
Q	(Canada) D Nestor	3	4
(West Germany) M Zoecke	6	6
(France) J-P Fleurian	7	3	2
2	(Spain) J Arrese	5	6	6

Second Round
5	(Spain) F Clavet	6^{5}	6	3
(Spain) C Costa	7^{7}	3	6
WC	(Ecuador) A Gómez	6	6
(West Germany) P Baur	3	2
7	(France) O Delaître	4	1
(Spain) G López	6	6
(West Germany) M Zoecke	6	6^{6}	6
2	(Spain) J Arrese	1	7^{8}	3

Quarterfinals
(Spain) C Costa	4	6	6
WC	(Ecuador) A Gómez	6	1	3
(Spain) G López	3	6	5
(West Germany) M Zoecke	6	4	7

Semifinals
(Spain) C Costa	4	2
(West Germany) M Zoecke	6	6
