= 1991 Internazionali Cassa di Risparmio =

ATP tennis tournament in Bologna

- Date: 20–26 May
- Edition: 7th
- Category: World Series
- Draw: 32S / 16D
- Prize money: $225,000
- Surface: Clay / outdoor
- Location: Bologna, Italy
- Venue: Cierrebi Club

Champions

Singles
- (Italy) Paolo Canè

Doubles
- (United States) Luke Jensen / (Australia) Laurie Warder
- Bologna Outdoor

The 1991 Internazionali Cassa di Risparmio, also known as the Bologna Open, was a men's tennis tournament played on outdoor clay courts at the Cierrebi Club in Bologna in Italy and was part of the World Series of the 1991 ATP Tour. It was the seventh edition of the tournament and was held from 20 May until 26 May 1991. Unseeded Paolo Canè, who entered the main draw on a wildcard, won the singles title.

== Finals ==
=== Singles ===
(Italy) Paolo Canè defeated (Sweden) Jan Gunnarsson 5–7, 6–3, 7–5

- It was Canè's only singles title of the year and the 3rd and last of his career.

=== Doubles ===
(United States) Luke Jensen / (Australia) Laurie Warder defeated (Brazil) Luiz Mattar / (Brazil) Jaime Oncins 6–4, 7–6

- It was Jensen's 3rd doubles title of the year and the 5th of his career. It was Warder's 2nd doubles title of the year and the 8th of his career.
