= Markus Zoecke =

German tennis player (born 1968)

- Country (sports): Germany
- Residence: Berlin, Germany
- Born: 10 May 1968 (age 57); Berlin, Germany
- Height: 1.95 m (6 ft 5 in)
- Turned pro: 1989
- Plays: Right-handed (one-handed backhand)
- Prize money: $795,369

Singles
- Career record: 67–103
- Career titles: 1; 4 Challenger, 0 Futures
- Highest ranking: No. 48 (23 March 1992)

Grand Slam singles results
- Australian Open: 3R (1992)
- French Open: 1R (1990, 1992, 1994, 1995)
- Wimbledon: 3R (1994)
- US Open: 3R (1994)

Doubles
- Career record: 15–22
- Career titles: 1; 2 Challenger, 0 Futures
- Highest ranking: No. 233 (26 February 1996)
- Last updated on: 11 February 2022.

Markus Zoecke (German pronunciation: [ˈmaʁ.kʊs ˈtsøː.kə]; born 10 May 1968) is a German former professional tennis player. Zoecke's primary weapon was a powerful serve that he could hit thanks to his height (1.95 m). He reached a highest singles ranking of No. 48 in March 1992. During his career he won one singles and one doubles title. He played three matches for the German Davis Cup team in 1992 and 1995.

He is currently the sporting director at the Rot-Weiss Tennis Club in Berlin.

== ATP career finals ==
=== Singles: 2 (1 title, 1 runner-up) ===
| Legend Grand Slam Tournaments (0–0) ATP World Tour Finals (0–0) ATP Masters Series (0–0) ATP Championship Series (0–0) ATP World Series (1–1) | Finals by surface Hard (1–1) Clay (0–0) Grass (0–0) Carpet (0–0) | Finals by setting Outdoors (1–1) Indoors (0–0) |

| Result | W–L | Date | Tournament | Tier | Surface | Opponent | Score |
|---|---|---|---|---|---|---|---|
| Loss | 0–1 | Oct 1991 | Guarujá, Brazil | World Series | Hard | (Argentina) Javier Frana | 6–2, 6–7^{(1–7)}, 3–6 |
| Win | 1–1 | Mar 1994 | Sun City, South Africa | World Series | Hard | (Germany) Hendrik Dreekmann | 6–4, 6–1 |

=== Doubles: 1 (1 title) ===
| Legend Grand Slam Tournaments (0–0) ATP World Tour Finals (0–0) ATP Masters Series (0–0) ATP Championship Series (0–0) ATP World Series (1–0) | Finals by surface Hard (0–0) Clay (0–0) Grass (1–0) Carpet (0–0) | Finals by setting Outdoors (1–0) Indoors (0–0) |

| Result | W–L | Date | Tournament | Tier | Surface | Partner | Opponents | Score |
|---|---|---|---|---|---|---|---|---|
| Win | 1–0 | Jun 1995 | Newport, United States | World Series | Grass | (Germany) Jörn Renzenbrink | (Australia) Paul Kilderry (Portugal) Nuno Marques | 6–1, 6–2 |

== ATP Challenger and ITF Futures finals ==
=== Singles: 7 (4–3) ===
| Legend ATP Challenger (4–3) ITF Futures (0–0) | Finals by surface Hard (2–1) Clay (1–0) Grass (0–0) Carpet (1–2) |

| Result | W–L | Date | Tournament | Tier | Surface | Opponent | Score |
|---|---|---|---|---|---|---|---|
| Win | 1-0 | Jul 1989 | Rümikon, Switzerland | Challenger | Clay | (Argentina) Francisco Yunis | 6–2, 6–2 |
| Loss | 1-1 | Nov 1989 | Valkenswaard, Netherlands | Challenger | Carpet | (France) Eric Winogradsky | 6–3, 3–6, 4–6 |
| Loss | 1-2 | Jan 1991 | Heilbronn, Germany | Challenger | Carpet | (Italy) Diego Nargiso | 6–3, 6–7, 3–6 |
| Win | 2-2 | Apr 1991 | Taipei, Taiwan | Challenger | Hard | (United States) Kelly Jones | 6–3, 6–3 |
| Win | 3-2 | Jan 1994 | Heilbronn, Germany | Challenger | Carpet | (Italy) Cristiano Caratti | 6–3, 6–4, |
| Win | 4-2 | Aug 1994 | Istanbul, Turkey | Challenger | Hard | (France) Guillaume Raoux | 6–7, 6–4, 6–2 |
| Loss | 4-3 | Aug 1994 | Segovia, Spain | Challenger | Hard | (France) Rodolphe Gilbert | 2–6, 4–6 |

=== Doubles: 2 (2–0) ===
| Legend ATP Challenger (2–0) ITF Futures (0–0) | Finals by surface Hard (0–0) Clay (1–0) Grass (0–0) Carpet (1–0) |

| Result | W–L | Date | Tournament | Tier | Surface | Partner | Opponents | Score |
|---|---|---|---|---|---|---|---|---|
| Win | 1–0 | Jul 1989 | Rümikon, Switzerland | Challenger | Clay | (Czech Republic) Libor Pimek | (Australia) Russell Barlow (Germany) Harald Rittersbacher | 6–3, 6–4 |
| Win | 2–0 | Dec 1990 | Munich, Germany | Challenger | Carpet | (Germany) Jens Woehrmann | (Soviet Union) Dimitri Poliakov (Socialist Federal Republic of Yugoslavia) Slobodan Vojinovic | 6–4, 6–3 |

== Performance timeline ==
Key
| W | F | SF | QF | #R | RR | Q# | DNQ | A | NH |

(W) winner; (F) finalist; (SF) semifinalist; (QF) quarterfinalist; (#R) rounds 4, 3, 2, 1; (RR) round-robin stage; (Q#) qualification round; (DNQ) did not qualify; (A) absent; (NH) not held; (SR) strike rate (events won / competed); (W–L) win–loss record.

=== Singles ===
| Tournament | 1989 | 1990 | 1991 | 1992 | 1993 | 1994 | 1995 | SR | W–L | Win % |
|---|---|---|---|---|---|---|---|---|---|---|
Grand Slam tournaments
| Australian Open | A | 1R | 1R | 3R | 1R | 1R | 1R | 0 / 6 | 2–6 | 25% |
| French Open | A | 1R | A | 1R | A | 1R | 1R | 0 / 4 | 0–4 | 0% |
| Wimbledon | Q2 | 1R | A | 1R | A | 3R | 1R | 0 / 4 | 2–4 | 33% |
| US Open | A | A | A | 1R | 1R | 3R | A | 0 / 3 | 2–3 | 40% |
| Win–loss | 0–0 | 0–3 | 0–1 | 2–4 | 0–2 | 4–4 | 0–3 | 0 / 17 | 6–17 | 26% |
ATP Masters Series
| Indian Wells | A | A | A | 1R | A | A | 1R | 0 / 2 | 0–2 | 0% |
| Miami | A | 2R | A | 4R | A | A | 1R | 0 / 3 | 4–3 | 57% |
| Hamburg | 2R | 1R | A | 1R | A | A | 1R | 0 / 4 | 1–4 | 20% |
| Canada | A | A | 1R | A | A | A | A | 0 / 1 | 0–1 | 0% |
| Cincinnati | A | A | A | A | Q1 | A | A | 0 / 0 | 0–0 | – |
| Paris | A | A | A | A | A | Q1 | A | 0 / 0 | 0–0 | – |
| Win–loss | 1–1 | 1–2 | 0–1 | 3–3 | 0–0 | 0–0 | 0–3 | 0 / 10 | 5–10 | 33% |
