= 1991 Torneo Internazionale Città di Firenze =

Tennis tournament in Florence, Italy

- Date: 10–16 June
- Edition: 19th
- Category: World Series
- Draw: 32S / 16D
- Prize money: $250,000
- Surface: Clay / outdoor
- Location: Florence, Italy

Champions

Singles
- (Austria) Thomas Muster

Doubles
- (Sweden) Ola Jonsson / (Sweden) Magnus Larsson
- ATP Florence

The 1991 Torneo Internazionale Città di Firenze, also known as the ATP Florence, was a men's tennis tournament played on outdoor clay courts in Florence, Italy that was part of the World Series tier of the 1991 ATP Tour circuit. It was the 19th edition of the tournament and was played from 10 June until 16 June 1991. Unseeded Thomas Muster won the singles title.

== Finals ==
=== Singles ===
(Austria) Thomas Muster defeated (Austria) Horst Skoff 6–2, 6–7^{(2–7)}, 6–4

- It was Muster's 1st singles title of the year and the 9th of his career.

=== Doubles ===
(Sweden) Ola Jonsson / (Sweden) Magnus Larsson defeated (Spain) Juan Carlos Báguena / (Spain) Carlos Costa 3–6, 6–1, 6–1

- It was Jonsson's only doubles title of the year and the 1st of his career. It was Larsson's only doubles title of the year and the 1st of his career.
