= Bret Garnett =

American tennis player

- Country (sports): United States
- Born: 2 July 1967 (age 57); Honolulu, Hawaii, U.S.
- Height: 6 ft 1 in (185 cm)
- Turned pro: 1988
- Plays: Right-handed
- College: University of Southwestern Louisiana
- Prize money: $336,551

Singles
- Career record: 8–19
- Career titles: 0; 0 Challenger, 0 Futures
- Highest ranking: No. 203 (24 April 1989)

Grand Slam singles results
- Australian Open: 3R (1989, 1992)
- Wimbledon: 1R (1989)
- US Open: 1R (1993)

Doubles
- Career record: 72–120
- Career titles: 1; 3 Challenger, 0 Futures
- Highest ranking: No. 49 (22 March 1993)

Grand Slam doubles results
- Australian Open: QF (1993)
- French Open: 3R (1992)
- Wimbledon: 3R (1990, 1991, 1993)
- US Open: 3R (1990)

Grand Slam mixed doubles results
- French Open: 3R (1991)
- Wimbledon: 2R (1991, 1993, 1994)
- Last updated on: 2 April 2022.

Bret Garnett (born July 2, 1967), is a former professional tennis player from the United States.

Garnett enjoyed most of his tennis success while playing doubles. During his career he won 1 doubles title. He achieved a career-high doubles ranking of World No. 49 in 1993.

Garnett's highest singles ranking was World No. 203 which he reached April, 1989.

Garnett played college tennis at the University of Southwestern Louisiana, where he was later inducted into their Athletics Hall of Fame. A native of Columbia, South Carolina, he and his wife Cheryl resided in Camden, South Carolina during his tour days.

== ATP career finals ==
=== Doubles: 4 (1 title, 3 runner-ups) ===
| Legend Grand Slam Tournaments (0–0) ATP World Tour Finals (0–0) ATP Masters Series (0–0) ATP Championship Series (1–0) ATP World Series (0–3) | Finals by surface Hard (1–1) Clay (0–2) Grass (0–0) Carpet (0–0) | Finals by setting Outdoors (1–3) Indoors (0–0) |

| Result | W–L | Date | Tournament | Tier | Surface | Partner | Opponents | Score |
|---|---|---|---|---|---|---|---|---|
| Loss | 0–1 | May 1991 | Charlotte, United States | World Series | Clay | (United States) Greg Van Emburgh | (United States) Rick Leach (United States) Jim Pugh | 3–6, 6–2, 3–6 |
| Loss | 0–2 | Oct 1991 | Guaruja, Brazil | World Series | Hard | (United States) Todd Nelson | (Netherlands) Jacco Eltingh (Netherlands) Paul Haarhuis | 3–6, 5–7 |
| Loss | 0–3 | May 1992 | Charlotte, United States | World Series | Clay | (United States) Jared Palmer | (United States) Steve DeVries (Australia) David Macpherson | 4–6, 6–7 |
| Win | 1–3 | Jul 1992 | Washington, United States | Championship Series | Hard | (United States) Jared Palmer | (United States) Ken Flach (United States) Todd Witsken | 6–2, 6–3 |

== ATP Challenger and ITF Futures finals ==
=== Doubles: 5 (3–2) ===
| Legend ATP Challenger (3–2) ITF Futures (0–0) | Finals by surface Hard (1–1) Clay (1–0) Grass (0–0) Carpet (1–1) |

| Result | W–L | Date | Tournament | Tier | Surface | Partner | Opponents | Score |
|---|---|---|---|---|---|---|---|---|
| Win | 1–0 | Nov 1989 | Bossonnens, Switzerland | Challenger | Hard | (United States) Kent Kinnear | (United States) Brett Dickinson (United States) Bryan Shelton | 7–6, 6–3 |
| Loss | 1–1 | Oct 1990 | Ponte Vedra, United States | Challenger | Hard | (South Africa) Royce Deppe | (United States) Doug Flach (United States) Ken Flach | 3–6, 6–2, 4–6 |
| Win | 2–1 | Apr 1992 | Birmingham, United States | Challenger | Clay | (Sweden) Tobias Svantesson | (Sweden) Jan Apell (Sweden) Peter Nyborg | 6–4, 7–6 |
| Loss | 2–2 | Feb 1995 | Lippstadt, Germany | Challenger | Carpet | (United States) T.J. Middleton | (United States) Bill Behrens (Germany) Mathias Huning | 4–6, 6–3, 6–7 |
| Win | 3–2 | Feb 1995 | Hambühren, Germany | Challenger | Carpet | (United States) T.J. Middleton | (Australia) Brent Larkham (United Kingdom) Chris Wilkinson | 6–2, 3–0 ret. |

== Performance timelines ==
Key
| W | F | SF | QF | #R | RR | Q# | DNQ | A | NH |

(W) winner; (F) finalist; (SF) semifinalist; (QF) quarterfinalist; (#R) rounds 4, 3, 2, 1; (RR) round-robin stage; (Q#) qualification round; (DNQ) did not qualify; (A) absent; (NH) not held; (SR) strike rate (events won / competed); (W–L) win–loss record.

=== Singles ===
| Tournament | 1989 | 1990 | 1991 | 1992 | 1993 | 1994 | SR | W–L | Win % |
|---|---|---|---|---|---|---|---|---|---|
Grand Slam tournaments
| Australian Open | 3R | A | Q1 | 3R | 1R | Q2 | 0 / 3 | 4–3 | 57% |
| French Open | A | A | A | A | A | A | 0 / 0 | 0–0 | – |
| Wimbledon | 1R | A | A | Q2 | A | A | 0 / 1 | 0–1 | 0% |
| US Open | A | A | A | Q2 | 1R | A | 0 / 1 | 0–1 | 0% |
| Win–loss | 2–2 | 0–0 | 0–0 | 2–1 | 0–2 | 0–0 | 0 / 5 | 4–5 | 44% |
ATP Tour Masters 1000
| Monte Carlo | A | A | A | A | Q1 | A | 0 / 0 | 0–0 | – |
| Hamburg | A | A | A | A | Q1 | A | 0 / 0 | 0–0 | – |
| Rome | A | A | A | A | Q1 | A | 0 / 0 | 0–0 | – |
| Canada | 1R | A | A | A | Q1 | Q3 | 0 / 1 | 0–1 | 0% |
| Cincinnati | A | A | A | Q2 | A | Q1 | 0 / 0 | 0–0 | – |
| Win–loss | 0–1 | 0–0 | 0–0 | 0–0 | 0–0 | 0–0 | 0 / 1 | 0–1 | 0% |

=== Doubles ===
| Tournament | 1989 | 1990 | 1991 | 1992 | 1993 | 1994 | SR | W–L | Win % |
|---|---|---|---|---|---|---|---|---|---|
Grand Slam tournaments
| Australian Open | 1R | A | 1R | 1R | QF | 1R | 0 / 5 | 3–5 | 38% |
| French Open | A | A | 1R | 3R | 1R | 1R | 0 / 4 | 2–4 | 33% |
| Wimbledon | Q3 | 3R | 3R | 1R | 3R | 1R | 0 / 5 | 6–5 | 55% |
| US Open | A | 3R | 1R | 1R | 1R | 1R | 0 / 5 | 2–5 | 29% |
| Win–loss | 0–1 | 4–2 | 2–4 | 2–4 | 5–4 | 0–4 | 0 / 19 | 13–19 | 41% |
ATP Tour Masters 1000
| Indian Wells | A | A | A | A | QF | A | 0 / 1 | 2–1 | 67% |
| Miami | A | A | 1R | 1R | 1R | 2R | 0 / 4 | 1–4 | 20% |
| Monte Carlo | A | A | A | A | 1R | A | 0 / 1 | 0–1 | 0% |
| Hamburg | A | A | A | A | 2R | A | 0 / 1 | 1–1 | 50% |
| Rome | A | A | A | A | QF | A | 0 / 1 | 2–1 | 67% |
| Canada | 1R | A | 1R | 1R | 1R | 2R | 0 / 5 | 1–5 | 17% |
| Cincinnati | A | A | A | 1R | 1R | Q1 | 0 / 2 | 0–2 | 0% |
| Win–loss | 0–1 | 0–0 | 0–2 | 0–3 | 5–7 | 2–2 | 0 / 15 | 7–15 | 32% |

=== Mixed doubles ===
| Tournament | 1990 | 1991 | 1992 | 1993 | 1994 | SR | W–L | Win % |
|---|---|---|---|---|---|---|---|---|
Grand Slam tournaments
| Australian Open | A | A | A | A | A | 0 / 0 | 0–0 | – |
| French Open | A | 3R | A | 1R | A | 0 / 2 | 1–2 | 33% |
| Wimbledon | 1R | 2R | 1R | 2R | 2R | 0 / 5 | 3–5 | 38% |
| US Open | A | A | A | A | A | 0 / 0 | 0–0 | – |
| Win–loss | 0–1 | 2–2 | 0–1 | 1–2 | 1–1 | 0 / 7 | 4–7 | 36% |
