= Todd Nelson (tennis) =

American tennis player

- Country (sports): United States
- Born: 18 March 1961 (age 65) The Dalles, Oregon, United States
- Height: 6 ft 1 in (185 cm)
- Turned pro: 1983
- Plays: Right-handed (one-handed backhand)
- Prize money: $541,277

Singles
- Career record: 53–90
- Career titles: 0
- Highest ranking: No. 58 (16 June 1986)

Grand Slam singles results
- Australian Open: 2R (1985, 1987)
- French Open: 2R (1986)
- Wimbledon: 2R (1993)
- US Open: 3R (1984)

Doubles
- Career record: 73–131
- Career titles: 0
- Highest ranking: No. 48 (2 February 1987)

Grand Slam doubles results
- Australian Open: QF (1987)
- French Open: 1R (1987, 1988, 1990, 1992, 1993)
- Wimbledon: 2R (1987)
- US Open: SF (1986)

Grand Slam mixed doubles results
- Australian Open: 1R (1990)
- French Open: 1R (1990)
- Wimbledon: SF (1990)
- US Open: 2R (1990)
- Last updated on: 26 March 2022.

Todd Nelson (born March 18, 1961, in The Dalles, Oregon), is a former professional tennis player from the United States and played collegiate tennis at Arizona State University.

Nelson enjoyed most of his tennis success while playing doubles. During his career he finished runner-up in four doubles events and one singles event. He achieved a career-high doubles ranking of world No. 48 in 1987.

== ATP career finals ==
=== Singles: 1 (1 runner-up) ===
Legend Grand Slam Tournaments (0–0) ATP World Tour Finals (0–0) ATP Masters Series (0–0) ATP Championship Series (0–0) ATP Grand Prix (0–1)	Finals by surface Hard (0–0) Clay (0–0) Grass (0–0) Carpet (0–1)	Finals by setting Outdoors (0–0) Indoors (0–1)

Result	W–L	Date	Tournament	Tier	Surface	Opponent	Score
Loss	0–1	Feb 1988	Lyon, France	Grand Prix	Carpet	(Senegal) Yahiya Doumbia	4–6, 6–3, 3–6

=== Doubles: 4 (4 runner-ups) ===
Legend Grand Slam Tournaments (0–0) ATP World Tour Finals (0–0) ATP Masters Series (0–0) ATP Championship Series (0–0) ATP Grand Prix (0–4)	Finals by surface Hard (0–1) Clay (0–1) Grass (0–1) Carpet (0–1)	Finals by setting Outdoors (0–3) Indoors (0–1)

Result	W–L	Date	Tournament	Tier	Surface	Partner	Opponents	Score
Loss	0–1	Jul 1989	Boston, United States	Grand Prix	Clay	(United States) Phillip Williamson	(Ecuador) Andrés Gómez (Argentina) Alberto Mancini	6–7, 2–6
Loss	0–2	Oct 1989	Toulouse, France	Grand Prix	Carpet	(The Bahamas) Roger Smith	(Iran) Mansour Bahrami (France) Éric Winogradsky	2–6, 6–7
Loss	0–3	Jul 1990	Newport, United States	World Series	Grass	(United States) Bryan Shelton	(Australia) Darren Cahill (Australia) Mark Kratzmann	6–7, 2–6
Loss	0–4	Oct 1991	Guarujá, Brazil	World Series	Hard	(United States) Bret Garnett	(Netherlands) Jacco Eltingh (Netherlands) Paul Haarhuis	3–6, 5–7

== ATP Challenger and ITF Futures finals ==
=== Singles: 1 (0–1) ===
Legend ATP Challenger (0–1) ITF Futures (0–0)	Finals by surface Hard (0–1) Clay (0–0) Grass (0–0) Carpet (0–0)

Result	W–L	Date	Tournament	Tier	Surface	Opponent	Score
Loss	0-1	Sep 1992	Singapore, Singapore	Challenger	Hard	(France) Lionel Roux	2–6, 0–6

=== Doubles: 6 (3–3) ===
Legend ATP Challenger (3–3) ITF Futures (0–0)	Finals by surface Hard (2–2) Clay (1–0) Grass (0–0) Carpet (0–1)

Result	W–L	Date	Tournament	Tier	Surface	Partner	Opponents	Score
Loss	0–1	Mar 1990	Martinique, Martinique	Challenger	Hard	(The Bahamas) Roger Smith	(France) Olivier Delaître (France) Guillaume Raoux	3–6, 5–7
Loss	0–2	May 1992	Itu, Brazil	Challenger	Hard	(Haiti) Bertrand Madsen	(South Africa) Grant Stafford (South Africa) Kevin Ullyett	1–6, 3–6
Win	1–2	Aug 1992	New Haven, United States	Challenger	Hard	(India) Leander Paes	(United Kingdom) Jeremy Bates (Zimbabwe) Byron Black	7–5, 2–6, 7–6
Win	2–2	Dec 1992	Naples, United States	Challenger	Clay	(Sweden) Tobias Svantesson	(The Bahamas) Mark Knowles (United States) Alex O'Brien	2–6, 6–3, 6–4
Win	3–2	Feb 1993	Rancho Mirage, United States	Challenger	Hard	(Sweden) Tobias Svantesson	(United States) T. J. Middleton (United States) Kenny Thorne	7–6, 6–3
Loss	3–3	Oct 1993	Dublin, Ireland	Challenger	Carpet	(Norway) Bent-Ove Pedersen	(Sweden) Mårten Renström (Sweden) Mikael Tillström	2–6, 6–3, 3–6

== Performance timelines ==
Key
W	F	SF	QF	#R	RR	Q#	DNQ	A	NH

(W) winner; (F) finalist; (SF) semifinalist; (QF) quarterfinalist; (#R) rounds 4, 3, 2, 1; (RR) round-robin stage; (Q#) qualification round; (DNQ) did not qualify; (A) absent; (NH) not held; (SR) strike rate (events won / competed); (W–L) win–loss record.

=== Singles ===
Tournament	1983	1984	1985	1986	1987	1988	1989	1990	1991	1992	1993	1994	1995	SR	W–L	Win %
Grand Slam tournaments
Australian Open	A	A	2R	A	2R	1R	A	Q2	A	Q2	Q3	Q1	A	0 / 3	2–3	40%
French Open	A	A	1R	2R	1R	A	A	A	A	A	Q1	Q1	A	0 / 3	1–3	25%
Wimbledon	Q1	Q1	1R	1R	1R	1R	Q2	A	A	Q3	2R	Q2	Q1	0 / 5	1–5	17%
US Open	1R	3R	2R	1R	1R	1R	A	A	A	1R	Q1	Q3	A	0 / 7	3–7	30%
Win–loss	0–1	2–1	2–4	1–3	1–4	0–3	0–0	0–0	0–0	0–1	1–1	0–0	0–0	0 / 18	7–18	28%
ATP Tour Masters 1000
Miami Open	A	A	A	A	1R	A	A	A	A	A	Q3	A	Q1	0 / 1	0–1	0%
Hamburg	A	A	A	A	A	A	A	A	A	A	A	A	Q1	0 / 0	0–0	–
Canada Masters	1R	2R	A	2R	A	1R	A	A	A	A	Q2	Q2	A	0 / 4	2–4	33%
Cincinnati Masters	A	A	A	A	A	A	A	A	A	Q1	Q1	A	A	0 / 0	0–0	–
Paris Masters	A	A	A	1R	A	A	A	A	A	A	A	A	A	0 / 1	0–1	0%
Win–loss	0–1	1–1	0–0	1–2	0–1	0–1	0–0	0–0	0–0	0–0	0–0	0–0	0–0	0 / 6	2–6	25%

=== Doubles ===
Tournament	1983	1984	1985	1986	1987	1988	1989	1990	1991	1992	1993	1994	1995	SR	W–L	Win %
Grand Slam tournaments
Australian Open	A	A	A	A	QF	2R	A	1R	A	2R	2R	A	A	0 / 5	5–5	50%
French Open	A	A	A	A	1R	1R	A	1R	A	1R	1R	A	A	0 / 5	0–5	0%
Wimbledon	Q2	Q3	A	A	2R	1R	Q1	1R	1R	1R	1R	Q1	Q3	0 / 6	1–6	14%
US Open	A	A	A	A	1R	A	2R	1R	2R	1R	A	1R	Q1	0 / 7	6–7	46%
Win–loss	0–0	0–0	0–0	4–1	3–4	1–3	1–1	0–4`	1–2	1–4	1–3	0–1	0–0	0 / 23	12–23	34%
ATP Tour Masters 1000
Miami Open	A	A	A	A	1R	A	A	2R	1R	2R	1R	A	A	0 / 5	2–5	29%
Canada Masters	A	A	A	A	A	1R	1R	QF	A	A	Q1	1R	A	0 / 4	2–4	33%
Cincinnati Masters	A	A	A	A	A	A	A	A	A	A	1R	A	A	0 / 1	0–1	0%
Paris Masters	A	A	A	1R	A	A	A	A	A	A	A	A	A	0 / 1	0–1	0%
Win–loss	0–0	0–0	0–0	0–1	0–1	0–1	0–1	3–2	0–1	1–1	0–2	0–1	0–0	0 / 11	4–11	27%

=== Mixed doubles ===
Tournament	1987	1988	1989	1990	1991	1992	SR	W–L	Win %
Grand Slam tournaments
Australian Open	A	A	A	1R	A	A	0 / 1	0–1	0%
French Open	A	A	A	1R	A	A	0 / 1	0–1	0%
Wimbledon	1R	1R	A	SF	1R	2R	0 / 5	5–5	50%
US Open	A	A	A	2R	A	A	0 / 1	1–1	50%
Win–loss	0–1	0–1	0–0	5–4	0–1	1–1	0 / 8	6–8	43%
