= Shelby Cannon =

American tennis player

- Country (sports): United States
- Residence: Raleigh, North Carolina, U.S.
- Born: August 19, 1966 (age 59) Hattiesburg, Mississippi, U.S.
- Height: 6 ft 1 in (1.85 m)
- Plays: Left-handed
- College: University of Tennessee
- Career record: 2–8

Doubles
- Career record: 151–184
- Career titles: 3

Shelby Cannon (born August 19, 1966) is an American retired professional tennis player.

Cannon enjoyed most of his tennis success while playing doubles. During his career, he won three doubles titles and finished runner-up an additional six times. He achieved a career-high doubles ranking of World No. 27 in 1993.

Cannon played college tennis for the Tennessee Volunteers. While on tour, Cannon kept a residence in Ponte Vedra Beach, Florida.

== Grand Slam, Grand Prix and ATP Tour finals ==
=== Doubles (3 titles, 6 runner-ups) ===
Result	No.	Date	Tournament	Surface	Partner	Opponents	Score
Loss	1.	Aug 1989	Montreal, Canada	Hard	(United States) Charles Beckman	(New Zealand) Kelly Evernden (United States) Todd Witsken	3–6, 3–6
Win	1.	Oct 1990	São Paulo, Brazil	Carpet	(Venezuela) Alfonso Mora	(Netherlands) Mark Koevermans (Brazil) Luiz Mattar	6–7, 6–3, 7–6
Loss	2.	Feb 1991	Guarujá, Brazil	Hard	(United States) Greg Van Emburgh	(France) Olivier Delaître (France) Rodolphe Gilbert	2–6, 4–6
Win	2.	Jun 1992	Genoa, Italy	Clay	(United States) Greg Van Emburgh	(Netherlands) Paul Haarhuis (Netherlands) Mark Koevermans	6–1, 6–1
Loss	3.	Jan 1993	Doha, Qatar	Hard	(United States) Scott Melville	(Germany) Boris Becker (Germany) Patrik Kühnen	2–6, 4–6
Win	3.	Apr 1993	Barcelona, Spain	Clay	(United States) Scott Melville	(Spain) Sergio Casal (Spain) Emilio Sánchez	7–6, 6–1
Loss	4.	Apr 1993	Nice, France	Clay	(United States) Scott Melville	(Australia) David Macpherson (Australia) Laurie Warder	4–3, RET.
Loss	5.	Jan 1994	Doha, Qatar	Hard	(South Africa) Byron Talbot	(France) Olivier Delaître (France) Stephane Simian	3–6, 3–6
Loss	6.	Oct 1995	Santiago, Chile	Clay	(United States) Francisco Montana	(Czech Republic) Jiří Novák (Czech Republic) David Rikl	4–6, 6–4, 1–6
