= Greg Van Emburgh =

American tennis player

- Country (sports): United States
- Born: May 10, 1966 (age 60) New York City, U.S.
- Height: 6 ft 2 in (1.88 m)
- Plays: Right-handed
- Prize money: $625,031

Singles
- Career record: 2–2
- Career titles: 0
- Highest ranking: No. 253 (October 9, 1989)

Grand Slam singles results
- Australian Open: 3R (1994, 1995)
- French Open: 2R (1990)
- Wimbledon: SF (1990)
- US Open: 2R (1988, 1989, 1992)

Doubles
- Career record: 179–247
- Career titles: 6
- Highest ranking: No. 38 (March 22, 1993)

Grand Slam doubles results
- Australian Open: QF (1996)
- French Open: QF (1993)
- Wimbledon: 2R (1990)
- US Open: 2R (1995)
Medal record
Summer Universiade
| Bronze medal – third place | 1987 Zagreb | Mixed doubles |
| Bronze medal – third place | 1991 Sheffield | Mixed doubles |

Greg Van Emburgh (born May 10, 1966) is a former professional tennis player from the United States.

Van Emburgh enjoyed most of his tennis success while playing doubles. During his career he won six doubles titles and was runner-up eight times. He achieved a career-high doubles ranking of world No. 38 in March 1993.

His son Jenson Van Emburgh is a Paralympic table tennis player.

== Career finals ==
=== Doubles: 14 (6 titles / 8 runner-ups) ===
| Legend Grand Slam (0–0) Year-end championships (0–0) ATP Masters Series (0–0)) ATP Championship Series (0–0)) ATP International Series (6–8) | Finals by surface Hard (2–2) Grass (0–0) Clay (4–6) Carpet (0–0) |

| Result | W/L | Date | Tournament | Surface | Partner | Opponents | Score |
|---|---|---|---|---|---|---|---|
| Win | 1–0 | Jul 1988 | Schenectady, U.S. | Hard | (West Germany) Alexander Mronz | (United States) Paul Annacone (United States) Patrick McEnroe | 6–3, 6–7, 7–5 |
| Loss | 1–1 | Feb 1991 | Guaruja, Brazil | Hard | (United States) Shelby Cannon | (France) Olivier Delaître (France) Rodolphe Gilbert | 2–6, 4–6 |
| Loss | 1–2 | May 1991 | Charlotte, U.S. | Clay | (United States) Bret Garnett | (United States) Rick Leach (United States) Jim Pugh | 3–6, 6–2, 3–6 |
| Win | 2–2 | Jun 1992 | Genova, Italy | Clay | (United States) Shelby Cannon | (Netherlands) Paul Haarhuis (Netherlands) Mark Koevermans | 6–1, 6–1 |
| Win | 3–2 | Aug 1992 | Long Island, U.S. | Hard | (United States) Francisco Montana | (Italy) Gianluca Pozzi (Finland) Olli Rahnasto | 6–4, 6–2 |
| Loss | 3–3 | Jun 1993 | Florence, Italy | Clay | (Netherlands) Mark Koevermans | (Spain) Tomás Carbonell (Belgium) Libor Pimek | 6–7, 6–2, 1–6 |
| Loss | 3–4 | Jun 1993 | Genova, Italy | Clay | (Netherlands) Mark Koevermans | (Spain) Sergio Casal (Spain) Emilio Sánchez | 3–6, 6–7 |
| Loss | 3–5 | Jun 1994 | Florence, Italy | Clay | (United Kingdom) Neil Broad | (Australia) Jon Ireland (United States) Kenny Thorne | 6–7, 3–6 |
| Win | 4–5 | Aug 1994 | San Marino | Clay | (United Kingdom) Neil Broad | (Spain) Jordi Arrese (Italy) Renzo Furlan | 6–4, 7–6 |
| Loss | 4–6 | Sep 1994 | Palermo, Italy | Clay | (United Kingdom) Neil Broad | (Netherlands) Tom Kempers (United States) Jack Waite | 6–7, 4–6 |
| Win | 5–6 | Jul 1995 | Kitzbühel, Austria | Clay | (United States) Francisco Montana | (Spain) Jordi Arrese (Australia) Wayne Arthurs | 6–7, 6–3, 7–6 |
| Loss | 5–7 | Oct 1995 | Toulouse, France | Hard (i) | (United States) Dave Randall | (Sweden) Jonas Björkman (South Africa) John-Laffnie de Jager | 6–7, 6–7 |
| Loss | 5–8 | Apr 1996 | Estoril, Portugal | Clay | (Netherlands) Tom Nijssen | (Spain) Tomás Carbonell (Spain) Francisco Roig | 3–6, 2–6 |
| Win | 6–8 | May 1997 | Coral Springs, U.S. | Clay | (United States) Dave Randall | (United States) Luke Jensen (United States) Murphy Jensen | 6–7^{(2–7)}, 6–2, 7–6^{(7–2)} |
