= Guarujá Open =

Guaruja Open

Defunct tennis tournament
- Event name: Guarujá Open
- Tour: ATP Tour (1990–92); Grand Prix circuit (1981–83/1987–89)
- Founded: 1980
- Abolished: 1992
- Editions: 11
- Venue: Casa Grande Hotel; Hotel Jequitimar
- Surface: Hard

The Guarujá Open was a men's tennis tournament held in Guarujá, Brazil founded in 1980 that ran till 1992.

== History ==
The tournament was originally part of the ILTF Grand Prix Circuit, it was played on hard until its last year in 1992. The tournament was suspended from the tour from 1984 to 1986 but was part of the ILTF Independent Circuit, the 1984 edition was played on clay courts. Brazilian tennis players enjoyed great success at the tournament, with all but two of the nine finals featuring a Brazilian and the home representatives winning four times (and Luiz Mattar three times consecutively).

== Finals ==
=== Singles ===
Year	Champions	Runners-up	Score
1980	(France) Patrick Proisy	(Italy) Gianni Ocleppo	6–4, 6–2.
1981	(Brazil) Carlos Kirmayr	(Argentina) Ricardo Cano	6–4, 6–2.
1982	(United States) Van Winitsky	(Brazil) Carlos Kirmayr	6–3, 6–3.
1983	(Argentina) José Luis Clerc	(Sweden) Mats Wilander	3–6, 7–5, 6–1.
1984	(Brazil) Givaldo Barbosa	(Chile) Pedro Rebolledo	6–4, 6–3.
1985–86	Not held		
1987	(Brazil) Luiz Mattar	(Brazil) Cássio Motta	6–3, 5–7, 6–2.
1988	(Brazil) Luiz Mattar	(United States) Eliot Teltscher	6–3, 6–3.
1989	(Brazil) Luiz Mattar	(United States) Jimmy Brown	7–6, 6–4.
1990	(Argentina) Martín Jaite	(Brazil) Luiz Mattar	3–6, 6–4, 6–3.
1991	(Germany) Patrick Baur	(Brazil) Fernando Roese	6–2, 6–3.
1992	(Germany) Carsten Arriens	(Spain) Àlex Corretja	7–6, 6–3.

=== Doubles ===
Year	Champions	Runners-up	Score
1981	(Australia) David Carter (Australia) Paul Kronk	(Spain) Ángel Giménez (Colombia) Jairo Velasco	6–1, 7–6.
1982	(Australia) Kim Warwick (Australia) Phil Dent	(Brazil) Carlos Kirmayr (Brazil) Cássio Motta	6–7, 6–2, 6–4.
1983	(United States) Tim Gullikson (Czechoslovakia) Tomáš Šmíd	(Israel) Shlomo Glickstein (United States) Van Winitsky	6–4, 6–7, 6–4.
1984–86	Not held		
1987	(Brazil) Luiz Mattar (Brazil) Cássio Motta	(West Germany) Martin Hipp (West Germany) Tore Meinecke	7–6, 6–1.
1988	(Chile) Ricardo Acuña (United States) Luke Jensen	(Argentina) Javier Frana (Uruguay) Diego Pérez	6–1, 6–4.
1989	(Brazil) Ricardo Acioly (Brazil) Dácio Campos	(Brazil) César Kist (Brazil) Mauro Menezes	7–6, 7–6.
1990	(Argentina) Javier Frana (Argentina) Gustavo Luza	(Brazil) Luiz Mattar (Brazil) Cássio Motta	7–6, 7–6.
1991	(France) Olivier Delaître (France) Rodolphe Gilbert	(United States) Shelby Cannon (United States) Greg Van Emburgh	6–2, 6–4.
1992	(Sweden) Christer Allgårdh (Australia) Carl Limberger	(Uruguay) Diego Pérez (Spain) Francisco Roig	6–4, 6–3.

During 1991, two tournaments were played at Guarujá, both part of the ATP World Series. The second event, held in October, was played for the first and only time and referred to as the Bliss Cup. It was held on the hardcourts at Casa Grande Hotel, the same venue for the 1992 Guarujá event.

Year	Champions	Runners-up	Score
1991	(Argentina) Javier Frana	(Germany) Markus Zoecke	2–6, 7–6, 6–3
1991	(Netherlands) Jacco Eltingh (Netherlands) Paul Haarhuis	(United States) Bret Garnett (United States) Todd Nelson	6–3, 7–5

== Challenger tournaments ==
=== Singles ===
Year	Champions	Runners-up	Score
1982	(United States) Van Winitsky	(Brazil) Carlos Kirmayr	6–3, 6–3
1992	(Venezuela) Nicolás Pereira	(Brazil) Roberto Jabali	6–4, 6–4
