= Rodolphe Gilbert =

French tennis player

- Country (sports): France
- Born: 12 December 1968 (age 57) Brou-sur-Chantereine, France
- Height: 1.83 m (6 ft 0 in)
- Plays: Left-handed
- Prize money: $1,143,269

Singles
- Career record: 67–116
- Highest ranking: No. 61 (21 September 1992)

Grand Slam singles results
- Australian Open: 2R (1993, 1994)
- French Open: 3R (1992, 1993)
- Wimbledon: 2R (1997)
- US Open: 2R (1991, 1994)

Doubles
- Career record: 45–58
- Career titles: 2
- Highest ranking: No. 50 (8 January 1996)

Grand Slam doubles results
- Australian Open: 2R (1996)
- French Open: 3R (1994)
- Wimbledon: 1R (1991)
- US Open: 3R (1995)

Rodolphe Gilbert (French: [ʁɔdɔlf ʒilbɛʁ]; born 12 December 1968) is a former French male professional tennis player.

Gilbert won the doubles title at the ATP Guaruja in 1991 partnering countryman Olivier Delaître. The left-handed Gilbert, who won over $1,100,000 in prize money, reached a doubles career high ranking of 50, in January 1996.

== Career finals ==
=== Doubles (2 wins, 2 losses) ===
Result	W/L	Date	Tournament	Surface	Partner	Opponents	Score
Win	1–0	Feb 1991	Guarujá, Brazil	Hard	(France) Olivier Delaître	(United States) Shelby Cannon (United States) Greg Van Emburgh	6–2, 6–4
Loss	1–1	Feb 1995	Marseille, France	Carpet	(France) Jean-Philippe Fleurian	(South Africa) David Adams (Russia) Andrei Olhovskiy	1–6, 4–6
Win	2–1	Apr 1995	Johannesburg, South Africa	Hard	(France) Guillaume Raoux	(Germany) Martin Sinner (Netherlands) Joost Winnink	6–4, 3–6, 6–3
Loss	2–2	Sep 1996	Bournemouth, U.K.	Clay	(Portugal) Nuno Marques	(Germany) Marc-Kevin Goellner (United Kingdom) Greg Rusedski	3–6, 6–7
