= 1989 Sovran Bank Classic – Singles =

Singles
- 1989 Sovran Bank Classic

Final
- Champion: (United States) Tim Mayotte
- Runner-up: (United States) Brad Gilbert
- Score: 3–6, 6–4, 7–5

Details
- Draw: 56 (7Q / 2WC)
- Seeds: 16

Events
Singles	Doubles
← 1988 ·	Washington Open	· 1990 →

Jimmy Connors was the defending champion but did not compete that year.

Tim Mayotte won in the final 3–6, 6–4, 7–5 against Brad Gilbert.

== Seeds ==
The top eight seeds received a bye to the second round.

1. (United States) Tim Mayotte (champion)
2. (United States) Brad Gilbert (final)
3. (United States) Jay Berger (third round)
4. (France) Yannick Noah (third round)
5. (United States) Dan Goldie (second round)
6. (United States) Paul Annacone (third round)
7. (United States) Derrick Rostagno (third round)
8. (United States) Robert Seguso (second round)
9. (United States) Richard Matuszewski (first round)
10. (United States) Paul Chamberlin (quarterfinals)
11. (United States) Todd Witsken (semifinals)
12. (India) Ramesh Krishnan (quarterfinals)
13. (Czechoslovakia) Milan Šrejber (first round)
14. (United States) Jimmy Arias (second round)
15. (Australia) John Frawley (first round)
16. (United States) Jeff Tarango (second round)

== Draw ==
=== Key ===
- Q = Qualifier
- WC = Wild card
- LL = Lucky loser
- Alt = Alternate
- SE = Special exempt
- PR = Protected ranking
- ITF = ITF entry
- JE = Junior exempt
- w/o = Walkover
- r = Retired
- d = Defaulted
- SR = Special ranking

=== Finals ===
Semifinals
1	(United States) Tim Mayotte	6	6
11	(United States) Todd Witsken	3	2
(United States) Richey Reneberg	4	6	3
2	(United States) Brad Gilbert	6	3	6

Final
1	(United States) Tim Mayotte	3	6	7
2	(United States) Brad Gilbert	6	4	5

=== Top half ===
==== Section 1 ====
First round
Q	(United States) S Warner	4	6
(United States) J Ross	6	7
(Australia) B Dyke	4	3
(South Africa) B Moir	6	6
(Sweden) J Carlsson	6	6
15	(Australia) J Frawley	3	2
9	(United States) R Matuszewski	3	4
(Italy) G Pozzi	6	6
(Australia) S Youl	6	6
(Puerto Rico) M Nido	2	2
(United States) P Johnson	6	6
Q	(United States) D Goldberg	4	2

Second round
1	(United States) T Mayotte	7	6
(United States) J Ross	6	2
(South Africa) B Moir	7	4	6
(Sweden) J Carlsson	5	6	3
(Italy) G Pozzi	7	1	1
(Australia) S Youl	6	6	6
(United States) P Johnson	6	5
7	(United States) D Rostagno	7	7

Third round
1	(United States) T Mayotte	7	6
(South Africa) B Moir	6	3
(Australia) S Youl	7	7
7	(United States) D Rostagno	6	6

Quarterfinals
1	(United States) T Mayotte	6	6
(Australia) S Youl	3	3

==== Section 2 ====
First round
(Nigeria) N Odizor	7	1	6
(United States) D Pate	6	6	4
(West Germany) K Braasch	5	3
(United States) J Grabb	7	6
Q	(United States) S Bryan	2	0
14	(United States) J Arias	6	6
11	(United States) T Witsken	6	6
(Senegal) Y Doumbia	0	2
(United Kingdom) N Broad	6	7
(United States) B Garnett	4	6
WC	(United States) P McEnroe	1	7	3
(Jamaica) D Burke	6	6	6

Second round
3	(United States) J Berger	6	6
(Nigeria) N Odizor	2	2
(United States) J Grabb	7	7
14	(United States) J Arias	6	6
11	(United States) T Witsken	6	6
(United Kingdom) N Broad	4	4
(Jamaica) D Burke	5	3
6	(United States) P Annacone	7	6

Third round
3	(United States) J Berger	6	3
(United States) J Grabb	7	6
11	(United States) T Witsken	1	6	6
6	(United States) P Annacone	6	2	3

Quarterfinals
(United States) J Grabb	6	6	3
11	(United States) T Witsken	4	7	6

=== Bottom half ===
==== Section 3 ====
First round
(United States) J Brown	7	3	4
(Argentina) J Frana	5	6	6
(United States) D Wheaton	6	6	6
(United States) D Cassidy	7	4	0
(United States) K Jones	4	6	0
12	(India) R Krishnan	6	3	6
13	(Czechoslovakia) M Šrejber	6	0
(United States) R Reneberg	7	6
(South Africa) P Norval	6^{r}
(Australia) R Fromberg	6
(United States) N Caswell	7	0	0
(Australia) M Kratzmann	6	6	6

Second round
5	(United States) D Goldie	3	4
(Argentina) J Frana	6	6
(United States) D Wheaton	6	2	1
12	(India) R Krishnan	4	6	6
(United States) R Reneberg	6	6
(Australia) R Fromberg	1	3
(Australia) M Kratzmann	7	6	5
4	(France) Y Noah	6	7	7

Third round
(Argentina) J Frana	5	1
12	(India) R Krishnan	7	6
(United States) R Reneberg	6	7
4	(France) Y Noah	3	5

Quarterfinals
12	(India) R Krishnan	1	1
(United States) R Reneberg	6	6

==== Section 4 ====
First round
(United States) K Kinnear	6	2	2
Q	(United States) C Garner	4	6	6
Q	(United States) J Boytim	1	0^{r}
Q	(United States) M Barba	6	1
(Finland) O Rahnasto	4	1
10	(United States) P Chamberlin	6	6
16	(United States) J Tarango	6	6
(United States) M Robertson	2	3
(France) P Pech	4	3
(South Africa) G Muller	6	6
Q	(United States) J Schor	3	3
WC	(United States) M Washington	6	6

Second round
8	(United States) R Seguso	4	3
Q	(United States) C Garner	6	6
Q	(United States) M Barba	2	6
10	(United States) P Chamberlin	6	7
16	(United States) J Tarango	5	1
(South Africa) G Muller	7	6
WC	(United States) M Washington	6	3	6
2	(United States) B Gilbert	1	6	7

Third round
Q	(United States) C Garner	3	2
10	(United States) P Chamberlin	6	6
(South Africa) G Muller	2	6
2	(United States) B Gilbert	6	7

Quarterfinals
10	(United States) P Chamberlin	7	4	4
2	(United States) B Gilbert	6	6	6
