= 1989 Sovran Bank Classic – Doubles =

Doubles
- 1989 Sovran Bank Classic

Final
- Champions: (United Kingdom) Neil Broad; (South Africa) Gary Muller
- Runners-up: (United States) Jim Grabb; (United States) Patrick McEnroe
- Score: 6–7, 7–6, 6–4

Details
- Draw: 28
- Seeds: 8

Events
Singles	Doubles
← 1988 ·	Washington Open	· 1990 →

Rick Leach and Jim Pugh were the defending champions but did not compete that year.

Neil Broad and Gary Muller won in the final 6–7, 7–6, 6–4 against Jim Grabb and Patrick McEnroe.

== Seeds ==
The top four seeded teams received byes into the second round.

1. (United States) Jim Grabb / (United States) Patrick McEnroe (final)
2. (United States) Paul Annacone / (United States) Todd Witsken (second round)
3. (United States) Tim Pawsat / (Australia) Laurie Warder (second round)
4. (United States) Dan Goldie / (United States) David Pate (second round)
5. (United Kingdom) Neil Broad / (South Africa) Gary Muller (champions)
6. (Australia) Broderick Dyke / (Argentina) Javier Frana (semifinals)
7. (United States) Brad Gilbert / (United States) Robert Seguso (quarterfinals)
8. (United States) Paul Chamberlin / (United States) Richard Matuszewski (first round)

== Draw ==
=== Key ===
- Q = Qualifier
- WC = Wild card
- LL = Lucky loser
- Alt = Alternate
- SE = Special exempt
- PR = Protected ranking
- ITF = ITF entry
- JE = Junior exempt
- w/o = Walkover
- r = Retired
- d = Defaulted
- SR = Special ranking

=== Final ===
Semifinals

Final

1
- (United States) Jim Grabb
- (United States) Patrick McEnroe
7
6

6
- (Australia) Broderick Dyke
- (Argentina) Javier Frana
6
2

1
- (United States) Jim Grabb
- (United States) Patrick McEnroe
7
6
4

5
- (United Kingdom) Neil Broad
- (South Africa) Gary Muller
6
7
6

5
- (United Kingdom) Neil Broad
- (South Africa) Gary Muller
6
7

- (United States) Charles Beckman
- (United States) Shelby Cannon
4
6

=== Top half ===
First round

Second round

Quarterfinals

Semifinals

1
- (United States) J Grabb
- (United States) P McEnroe
6
6

- (United States) B Garnett
- (United States) K Kinnear
6
1

- (United States) D Rostagno
- (United States) D Wheaton
3
3

- (United States) D Rostagno
- (United States) D Wheaton
7
6

1
- (United States) J Grabb
- (United States) P McEnroe
6
6

- (Romania) M-I Năstase
- (Italy) G Pozzi
6
3
7

7
- (United States) B Gilbert
- (United States) R Seguso
0
1

- (United States) J Mangan
- (United States) F McNair
1
6
6

- (Romania) M-I Năstase
- (Italy) G Pozzi
1
4

- (United States) J Ross
- (United States) M Washington
2
6
4

7
- (United States) B Gilbert
- (United States) R Seguso
6
6

7
- (United States) B Gilbert
- (United States) R Seguso
6
4
6

1
- (United States) J Grabb
- (United States) P McEnroe
7
6

6
- (Australia) B Dyke
- (Argentina) J Frana
6
2

4
- (United States) D Goldie
- (United States) D Pate
6
4
4

- (Venezuela) A Mora
- (United States) J Schor
6
6
6

- (Venezuela) A Mora
- (United States) J Schor
4
6
6

- (United States) K Lubbers
- (United States) R Pellizzi
1
7
3

- (Venezuela) A Mora
- (United States) J Schor
2
7
5

- (United States) R Schmidt
- (United States) T Siegel
7
5
2

6
- (Australia) B Dyke
- (Argentina) J Frana
6
6
7

- (Puerto Rico) M Nido
- (Belgium) L Pimek
5
7
6

- (Puerto Rico) M Nido
- (Belgium) L Pimek
6
2

- (Australia) R Fromberg
- (Australia) D Tyson
5
2

6
- (Australia) B Dyke
- (Argentina) J Frana
7
6

6
- (Australia) B Dyke
- (Argentina) J Frana
7
6

=== Bottom half ===
First round

Second round

Quarterfinals

Semifinals

5
- (United Kingdom) N Broad
- (South Africa) G Muller
7
6

- (Australia) M Kratzmann
- (Australia) J Stoltenberg
6
4

5
- (United Kingdom) N Broad
- (South Africa) G Muller
6
6

- (United States) J Arias
- (United States) D Flach
6
4
7

- (United States) J Arias
- (United States) D Flach
3
3

- (France) Y Noah
- (Nigeria) N Odizor
4
6
6

5
- (United Kingdom) N Broad
- (South Africa) G Muller
7
6

- (United States) R Reneberg
- (Australia) S Youl
4
6
6

- (United States) R Reneberg
- (Australia) S Youl
6
1

- (United States) D Cassidy
- (South Africa) C Honey
6
4
1

- (United States) R Reneberg
- (Australia) S Youl
7
5
6

3
- (United States) T Pawsat
- (Australia) L Warder
6
7
2

5
- (United Kingdom) N Broad
- (South Africa) G Muller
6
7

8
- (United States) P Chamberlin
- (United States) R Matuszewski
6
6
4

- (United States) C Beckman
- (United States) S Cannon
4
6

- (United States) C Boynton
- (United States) T Mercer
2
7
6

- (United States) C Boynton
- (United States) T Mercer
6
6
4

- (South Africa) M Barnard
- (South Africa) B Moir
6
6

- (South Africa) M Barnard
- (South Africa) B Moir
7
4
6

- (Jamaica) D Burke
- (United States) M Robertson
4
2

- (South Africa) M Barnard
- (South Africa) B Moir
2
6

- (United States) R Baxter
- (United States) K Jones
2
2

- (United States) C Beckman
- (United States) S Cannon
6
7

- (United States) C Beckman
- (United States) S Cannon
6
6

- (United States) C Beckman
- (United States) S Cannon
7
6

2
- (United States) P Annacone
- (United States) T Witsken
6
4
