= 1991 Sovran Bank Classic =

- Date: July 15–21
- Edition: 23rd
- Category: Championship Series
- Draw: 56S / 28D
- Prize money: $465,000
- Surface: Hard / outdoors
- Location: Washington, D.C., U.S.
- Venue: William H.G. FitzGerald Tennis Center

Champions

Singles
- (United States) Andre Agassi

Doubles
- (United States) Scott Davis / (United States) David Pate
← 1990 ·	Washington Open	· 1992 →

The 1991 Sovran Bank Classic was a men's tennis tournament played on outdoor hard courts at the William H.G. FitzGerald Tennis Center in Washington, D.C. in the United States that was part of the Championship Series of the 1991 ATP Tour. It was the 23rd edition of the tournament was held from July 15 through July 21, 1991. First-seeded Andre Agassi won his second consecutive singles title at the event.

== Finals ==
=== Singles ===
(United States) Andre Agassi defeated (Czechoslovakia) Petr Korda 6–3, 6–4

- It was Agassi's second singles title of the year and the 14th of his career.

=== Doubles ===
(United States) Scott Davis / (United States) David Pate defeated (United States) Ken Flach / (United States) Robert Seguso 6–4, 6–2
