= 1989 Player's Canadian Open – Men's singles =

Men's singles
- 1989 Player's Canadian Open

Final
- Champion: (Czechoslovakia) Ivan Lendl
- Runner-up: (United States) John McEnroe
- Score: 6–1, 6–3

Details
- Draw: 56
- Seeds: 16

Events
Singles	men	women
Doubles	men	women
← 1988 ·	Player's Canadian Open	· 1990 →

Ivan Lendl was the defending champion.

Lendl successfully defended his title, defeating John McEnroe 6–1, 6–3 in the final.

== Seeds ==
1. (Czechoslovakia) Ivan Lendl (champion)
2. (United States) John McEnroe (final)
3. (United States) Andre Agassi (semifinals)
4. (United States) Tim Mayotte (third round)
5. (United States) Kevin Curren (third round)
6. (United States) Jay Berger (semifinals)
7. (Czechoslovakia) Miloslav Mečíř (second round)
8. (France) Yannick Noah (second round)
9. (Argentina) Guillermo Pérez Roldán (second round)
10. (Socialist Federal Republic of Yugoslavia) Goran Ivanišević (first round)
11. (United States) Glenn Layendecker (first round)
12. (Canada) Andrew Sznajder (quarterfinals)
13. (New Zealand) Kelly Evernden (third round)
14. (United States) Todd Witsken (second round)
15. (United States) Richey Reneberg (third round)
16. (United States) Jimmy Arias (third round)

== Draw ==
=== Key ===
- Q = Qualifier
- WC = Wild card
- LL = Lucky loser
- Alt = Alternate
- SE = Special exempt
- PR = Protected ranking
- ITF = ITF entry
- JE = Junior exempt
- w/o = Walkover
- r = Retired
- d = Defaulted
- SR = Special ranking

=== Finals ===
Semifinals
1	(Czechoslovakia) Ivan Lendl	6	3	6
3	(United States) Andre Agassi	2	6	4
6	(United States) Jay Berger	6	3	4
2	(United States) John McEnroe	4	6	6

Final
1	(Czechoslovakia) Ivan Lendl	6	6
2	(United States) John McEnroe	1	3

=== Top half ===
==== Section 1 ====
First round
(United States) K Jones	6	7	7
Q	(Australia) S Stolle	7	6	6
(United States) J Tarango	6	6
(Czechoslovakia) M Šrejber	4	4
(Sweden) T Högstedt	0	2
16	(United States) J Arias	6	6
10	(Socialist Federal Republic of Yugoslavia) G Ivanišević	3	4
(United States) J Canter	6	6
(Canada) M Laurendeau	6	6	6
WC	(Canada) R Janecek	2	7	1
Q	(United States) M Walker	3	5
(Canada) G Connell	6	7

Second round
1	(Czechoslovakia) I Lendl	7	6
(United States) K Jones	6	1
(United States) J Tarango	2	2
16	(United States) J Arias	6	6
(United States) J Canter	6	7
(Canada) M Laurendeau	3	5
(Canada) G Connell	6	4	6
7	(Czechoslovakia) M Mečíř	2	6	4

Third round
1	(Czechoslovakia) I Lendl	3	6	6
16	(United States) J Arias	6	1	4
(United States) J Canter	3	7	5
(Canada) G Connell	6	5	7

Quarterfinals
1	(Czechoslovakia) I Lendl	7	4	6
(Canada) G Connell	6	6	0

==== Section 2 ====
First round
Q	(United States) S Cannon	6	6
(Canada) M Greenan	4	1
(United States) L Shiras	4	6	6
(United Kingdom) J Bates	6	3	0
(Canada) C Pridham	6	4
13	(New Zealand) K Evernden	7	6
12	(Canada) A Sznajder	7	6	7
(Nigeria) N Odizor	6	7	6
WC	(Canada) S Leblanc	1	6
(France) J-P Fleurian	6	7
(Australia) C Limberger	5	6	7
(Sweden) J Carlsson	7	4	6

Second round
3	(United States) A Agassi	6	3	6
Q	(United States) S Cannon	3	6	3
(United States) L Shiras	4	6	4
13	(New Zealand) K Evernden	6	0	6
12	(Canada) A Sznajder	6	6
(France) J-P Fleurian	2	4
(Australia) C Limberger	4	5
5	(United States) K Curren	6	7

Third round
3	(United States) A Agassi	6	3	7
13	(New Zealand) K Evernden	2	6	5
12	(Canada) A Sznajder	6	2	6
5	(United States) K Curren	2	6	3

Quarterfinals
3	(United States) A Agassi	6	6
12	(Canada) A Sznajder	1	0

==== Section 3 ====
First round
Q	(United States) G Failla	4	4
(Australia) S Youl	6	6
(United States) S Giammalva Jr.	6	7
Q	(United States) T Ho	4	5
Q	(United States) C Garner	2	7	7
11	(United States) G Layendecker	6	6	5
14	(United States) T Witsken	6	6
WC	(Canada) S Lareau	1	1
(Venezuela) N Pereira	6	6
(Senegal) Y Doumbia	1	3
Q	(United States) C Beckman	2	2
(France) P Pech	6	6

Second round
6	(United States) J Berger	w/o
(Australia) S Youl
(United States) S Giammalva Jr.	6	6
Q	(United States) C Garner	0	1
14	(United States) T Witsken	3	1
(Venezuela) N Pereira	6	6
(France) P Pech	2	6
4	(United States) T Mayotte	6	7

Third round
6	(United States) J Berger	6	7
(United States) S Giammalva Jr.	3	5
(Venezuela) N Pereira	6	1	6
4	(United States) T Mayotte	3	6	3

Quarterfinals
6	(United States) J Berger	6	6	6
(Venezuela) N Pereira	7	1	3

==== Section 4 ====
First round
(United States) D Cassidy	2	3
(Austria) A Antonitsch	6	6
(Italy) D Nargiso	6	7	6
(The Bahamas) R Smith	7	5	1
(Canada) M Wostenholme	7	4	2
9	(Argentina) G Pérez Roldán	6	6	6
15	(United States) R Reneberg	6	6
(United States) B Garnett	3	4
(Australia) R Fromberg	6	6	6
(Canada) G Michibata	7	4	4
(United States) N Caswell	6	6
WC	(Canada) D Nestor	3	3

Second round
8	(France) Y Noah	3	7	6
(Austria) A Antonitsch	6	6	7
(Italy) D Nargiso	6	6
9	(Argentina) G Pérez Roldán	4	2
15	(United States) R Reneberg	3	7	6
(Australia) R Fromberg	6	5	1
(United States) N Caswell	2	6	3
2	(United States) J McEnroe	6	4	6

Third round
(Austria) A Antonitsch	3	6	6
(Italy) D Nargiso	6	3	3
15	(United States) R Reneberg	3	6
2	(United States) J McEnroe	6	7

Quarterfinals
(Austria) A Antonitsch	5	6	3
2	(United States) J McEnroe	7	2	6

== See also ==
- Lendl–McEnroe rivalry
