= 1993 Newsweek Tennis Classic =

Tennis tournament

- Date: July 19–25
- Edition: 25th
- Category: Championship Series
- Draw: 56S / 28D
- Prize money: $500,000
- Surface: Hard / outdoors
- Location: Washington, D.C., U.S.
- Venue: William H.G. FitzGerald Tennis Center

Champions

Singles
- (Israel) Amos Mansdorf

Doubles
- (Zimbabwe) Byron Black / (United States) Rick Leach
← 1992 ·	Washington Open	· 1994 →

The 1993 Newsweek Tennis Classic was a men's tennis tournament played on outdoor hard courts at the William H.G. FitzGerald Tennis Center in Washington, D.C. in the United States that was part of the Championship Series of the 1993 ATP Tour. It was the 25th edition of the tournament was held from July 19 through July 25, 1993. Eighth-seeded Amos Mansdorf won the singles title.

== Finals ==
=== Singles ===
(Israel) Amos Mansdorf defeated (United States) Todd Martin 7–6^{(7–3)}, 7–5

- It was Mansdorf's first singles title of the year and the sixth, and last, of his career.

=== Doubles ===
(Zimbabwe) Byron Black / (United States) Rick Leach defeated (Canada) Grant Connell / (United States) Patrick Galbraith 6–4, 7–5
