= 1989 Player's Canadian Open – Men's doubles =

Men's doubles
- 1989 Player's Canadian Open

Final
- Champions: (New Zealand) Kelly Evernden (United States) Todd Witsken
- Runners-up: (United States) Charles Beckman (United States) Shelby Cannon
- Score: 6–3, 6–3

Details
- Draw: 28 (1WC)
- Seeds: 8

Events
Singles	men	women
Doubles	men	women
← 1988 ·	Canadian Open	· 1990 →

Ken Flach and Robert Seguso were the defending champions, but the pair chose to compete at Cincinnati during the same week, winning that title.

Kelly Evernden and Todd Witsken won the title by defeating Charles Beckman and Shelby Cannon 6–3, 6–3 in the final.

== Seeds ==
The top four seeds received a bye to the second round.

1. (United Kingdom) Jeremy Bates / (United States) Kevin Curren (semifinals)
2. (Canada) Grant Connell / (Canada) Glenn Michibata (second round)
3. (Socialist Federal Republic of Yugoslavia) Goran Ivanišević / (Italy) Diego Nargiso (second round)
4. (United States) Sammy Giammalva Jr. / (United States) Glenn Layendecker (quarterfinals)
5. (New Zealand) Kelly Evernden / (United States) Todd Witsken (champions)
6. (Czechoslovakia) Miloslav Mečíř / (Czechoslovakia) Milan Šrejber (quarterfinals)
7. (Venezuela) Nicolás Pereira / (Argentina) Guillermo Pérez Roldán (first round)
8. (United States) Charles Beckman / (United States) Shelby Cannon (final)

== Draw ==
=== Key ===
- Q = Qualifier
- WC = Wild card
- LL = Lucky loser
- Alt = Alternate
- SE = Special exempt
- PR = Protected ranking
- ITF = ITF entry
- JE = Junior exempt
- w/o = Walkover
- r = Retired
- d = Defaulted
- SR = Special ranking

=== Finals ===
Semifinals
1	(United Kingdom) Jeremy Bates (United States) Kevin Curren	1	5
5	(New Zealand) Kelly Evernden (United States) Todd Witsken	6	7
(France) Jean-Philippe Fleurian (The Bahamas) Roger Smith	7	4	2
8	(United States) Charles Beckman (United States) Shelby Cannon	6	6	6

Final
5	(New Zealand) Kelly Evernden (United States) Todd Witsken	6	6
8	(United States) Charles Beckman (United States) Shelby Cannon	3	3

=== Top half ===
First round
(United States) J Schor (United States) J Sobel	6	7
(Sweden) J Carlsson (Canada) M Wostenholme	2	6
(United States) J Letts (United States) B Man-Son-Hing	3	5
(Austria) A Antonitsch (United States) J Canter	6	7
(Australia) R Fromberg (Australia) C Limberger	6	1	6
7	(Venezuela) N Pereira (Argentina) G Pérez Roldán	4	6	3
(Venezuela) A Mora (United States) M Ozer	4	2
(Senegal) Y Doumbia (United States) J Klaparda	6	6
(United States) D Cassidy (Nigeria) N Odizor	6	6
(United States) C Garner (United States) J Tarango	2	4
(United States) J Arias (United States) N Caswell	2	5
5	(New Zealand) K Evernden (United States) T Witsken	6	7

Second round
1	(United Kingdom) J Bates (United States) K Curren	6	6
(United States) J Schor (United States) J Sobel	4	2
(Austria) A Antonitsch (United States) J Canter	6	6
(Australia) R Fromberg (Australia) C Limberger	3	2
4	(United States) S Giammalva Jr. (United States) G Layendecker	6	4	7
(Senegal) Y Doumbia (United States) J Klaparda	4	6	5
(United States) D Cassidy (Nigeria) N Odizor	2	3
5	(New Zealand) K Evernden (United States) T Witsken	6	6

Quarterfinals
1	(United Kingdom) J Bates (United States) K Curren	7	6	7
(Austria) A Antonitsch (United States) J Canter	6	7	5
4	(United States) S Giammalva Jr. (United States) G Layendecker	4	4
5	(New Zealand) K Evernden (United States) T Witsken	6	6

Semifinals
1	(United Kingdom) J Bates (United States) K Curren	1	5
5	(New Zealand) K Evernden (United States) T Witsken	6	7

=== Bottom half ===
First round
6	(Czechoslovakia) M Mečíř (Czechoslovakia) M Šrejber	6	6	6
WC	(Canada) D Nestor (Canada) C Pridham	7	1	4
(United States) B Garnett (United States) L Shiras	6	3	4
(Czechoslovakia) I Lendl (Canada) A Sznajder	4	6	6
(United States) T Nelson (United States) P Williamson	7	1	6
(France) JP Fleurian (The Bahamas) R Smith	6	6	7
8	(United States) C Beckman (United States) S Cannon	6	6
(United States) R Reneberg (Australia) S Youl	1	3
(United States) K Jones (Canada) M Laurendeau	0	6	7
(Canada) S Lareau (Canada) S Leblanc	6	3	6
(Canada) M Greenan (United States) Mark Jacobson	3	6	2
(Romania) I Năstase (France) Y Noah	6	2	6

Second round
6	(Czechoslovakia) M Mečíř (Czechoslovakia) M Šrejber	6	7
(Czechoslovakia) I Lendl (Canada) A Sznajder	0	5
(France) JP Fleurian (The Bahamas) R Smith	6	7
3	(Socialist Federal Republic of Yugoslavia) G Ivanišević (Italy) D Nargiso	3	6
8	(United States) C Beckman (United States) S Cannon	4	7	6
(United States) K Jones (Canada) M Laurendeau	6	6	0
(Romania) I Năstase (France) Y Noah	3	7	7
2	(Canada) G Connell (Canada) G Michibata	6	6	6

Quarterfinals
6	(Czechoslovakia) M Mečíř (Czechoslovakia) M Šrejber	6	6	6
(France) JP Fleurian (The Bahamas) R Smith	7	1	7
8	(United States) C Beckman (United States) S Cannon	6	4	6
(Romania) I Năstase (France) Y Noah	2	6	2

Semifinals
(France) JP Fleurian (The Bahamas) R Smith	7	4	2
8	(United States) C Beckman (United States) S Cannon	6	6	6
