= 1989 Sovran Bank Classic =

- Date: July 24–30
- Edition: 21st
- Draw: 56S / 28D
- Prize money: $297,500
- Surface: Hard / outdoors
- Location: Washington, D.C., U.S.
- Venue: William H.G. FitzGerald Tennis Center

Champions

Singles
- (United States) Tim Mayotte

Doubles
- (United Kingdom) Neil Broad / (South Africa) Gary Muller
| ← 1988 · | Washington Open | · 1990 → |

The 1989 Sovran Bank Classic was a men's tennis tournament played on outdoor hard courts at the William H.G. FitzGerald Tennis Center in Washington, D.C. in the United States that was part of the 1989 Nabisco Grand Prix. It was the 21st edition of the tournament was held from July 24 through July 30, 1989. First-seeded Tim Mayotte won the singles title.

== Finals ==
=== Singles ===
(United States) Tim Mayotte defeated (United States) Brad Gilbert 3–6, 6–4, 7–5

- It was Mayotte's only singles title of the year and the 12th and final of his career.

=== Doubles ===
(United Kingdom) Neil Broad / (South Africa) Gary Muller defeated (United States) Jim Grabb / (United States) Patrick McEnroe 6–7, 7–6, 6–4

- It was Broad's 2nd title of the year and the 2nd of his career. It was Muller's only title of the year and the 2nd of his career.
