= 1989 Player's Canadian Open – Women's singles =

Women's singles
- 1989 Player's Canadian Open

Final
- Champion: (United States) Martina Navratilova
- Runner-up: (Spain) Arantxa Sánchez Vicario
- Score: 6–2, 6–2

Details
- Draw: 56 (8Q)
- Seeds: 16

Events
Singles	men	women
Doubles	men	women
← 1988 ·	Canadian Open	· 1990 →

Gabriela Sabatini was the defending champion, but lost in the semifinals to Arantxa Sánchez Vicario.

Martina Navratilova won the title by defeating Sánchez Vicario 6–2, 6–2 in the final.

== Seeds ==
The first eight seeds received a bye to the second round.

1. (United States) Martina Navratilova (champion)
2. (Argentina) Gabriela Sabatini (semifinals)
3. (United States) Chris Evert (second round)
4. (Spain) Arantxa Sánchez Vicario (final)
5. (Czechoslovakia) Jana Novotná (quarterfinals)
6. (Soviet Union) Natasha Zvereva (second round)
7. (Australia) Hana Mandlíková (second round)
8. (Sweden) Catarina Lindqvist (second round)
9. (Canada) Helen Kelesi (third round)
10. (France) Nathalie Tauziat (quarterfinals)
11. (Austria) Barbara Paulus (third round)
12. (Czechoslovakia) Radka Zrubáková (third round)
13. (Austria) Judith Wiesner (first round)
14. (United States) Terry Phelps (first round)
15. (West Germany) Sylvia Hanika (quarterfinals)
16. (Soviet Union) Larisa Savchenko (first round)

== Draw ==
=== Key ===
- Q = Qualifier
- WC = Wild card
- LL = Lucky loser
- Alt = Alternate
- ITF = ITF entry
- PR = Protected ranking
- SR = Special ranking
- SE = Special exempt
- JE = Junior exempt
- JR = Junior Accelerator Programme entrant
- CO = College Accelerator Programme entrant
- NG = Next Gen Accelerator Program entrant
- w/o = Walkover
- r = Retired
- d = Defaulted

=== Finals ===
Quarterfinals
1	(United States) Martina Navratilova	6	3	6
Q	(Japan) Nana Miyagi	2	6	2
(Australia) Anne Minter	6	6
15	(West Germany) Sylvia Hanika	2	3
10	(France) Nathalie Tauziat	3	2
4	(Spain) Arantxa Sánchez Vicario	6	6
5	(Czechoslovakia) Jana Novotná	1	6	0
2	(Argentina) Gabriela Sabatini	6	3	6

Semifinals
1	(United States) Martina Navratilova	6	6
(Australia) Anne Minter	0	2
4	(Spain) Arantxa Sánchez Vicario	3	7	6
2	(Argentina) Gabriela Sabatini	6	5	3

Final
1	(United States) Martina Navratilova	6	6
4	(Spain) Arantxa Sánchez Vicario	2	2

=== Top half ===
==== Section 1 ====
First round
(United States) G Fernández	6	6
Q	(Poland) I Kuczyńska	0	1
(Australia) R McQuillan	6	6^{7}	3
(Czechoslovakia) R Rajchrtová	3	7^{9}	6
(United States) H Na	4	6^{5}
9	(Canada) H Kelesi	6	7^{7}
12	(Czechoslovakia) R Zrubáková	6	7^{9}
(Czechoslovakia) P Langrová	3	6^{7}
(Australia) N Provis	6	6
(West Germany) E Pfaff	2	4
Q	(Japan) N Miyagi	6	6
(Canada) J Hetherington	1	2

Second round
1	(United States) M Navratilova	3	6	6
(United States) G Fernández	6	1	3
(Czechoslovakia) R Rajchrtová	1	2
9	(Canada) H Kelesi	6	6
12	(Czechoslovakia) R Zrubáková	6	1
(Australia) N Provis	2	0^{r}
Q	(Japan) N Miyagi	3	7^{7}	6
6	(Soviet Union) N Zvereva	6	6^{5}	2

Third round
1	(United States) M Navratilova	6	6
9	(Canada) H Kelesi	3	3
12	(Czechoslovakia) R Zrubáková	6	5	5
Q	(Japan) N Miyagi	3	7	7

Quarterfinals
1	(United States) M Navratilova	6	3	6
Q	(Japan) N Miyagi	2	6	2

==== Section 2 ====
First round
(Australia) A Minter	6	6
(Canada) R Simpson	0	3
(France) I Demongeot	6	6
(France) C Tanvier	3	0
Q	(France) C Suire	7	6
14	(United States) T Phelps	5	4
15	(West Germany) S Hanika	6	7
(Japan) E Inoue	3	5
Q	(United States) A Grousbeck	4	3
(United States) S Stafford	6	6
Q	(United States) M Van Nostrand	4	2
(Czechoslovakia) J Pospíšilová	6	6

Second round
3	(United States) C Evert	4	5
(Australia) A Minter	6	7
(France) I Demongeot	6	2	3
Q	(France) C Suire	1	6	6
15	(West Germany) S Hanika	6	7
(United States) S Stafford	2	5
(Czechoslovakia) J Pospíšilová	1	6	7
7	(Australia) H Mandlíková	6	1	5

Third round
(Australia) A Minter	6	6
Q	(France) C Suire	2	2
15	(West Germany) S Hanika	6	3	7^{7}
(Czechoslovakia) J Pospíšilová	4	6	6^{5}

Quarterfinals
(Australia) A Minter	6	6
15	(West Germany) S Hanika	2	3

=== Bottom half ===
==== Section 3 ====
First round
(Canada) M Drake	4	2
(United States) A Grossman	6	6
(United States) R White	6	6
(Soviet Union) L Meskhi	2	1
Q	(Soviet Union) N Medvedeva	6^{2}	6^{4}
10	(France) N Tauziat	7^{7}	7^{7}
13	(Austria) J Wiesner	3	4
(Australia) L Field	6	6
(United States) M Werdel	6	6
(United Kingdom) S Gomer	4	0
(Japan) A Kijimuta	7	2	0
(Australia) JA Faull	5	6	6

Second round
8	(Sweden) C Lindqvist	6	4	4
(United States) A Grossman	1	6	6
(United States) R White	2	4
10	(France) N Tauziat	6	6
(Australia) L Field	6	6
(United States) M Werdel	4	2
(Australia) JA Faull	1	4
4	(Spain) A Sánchez Vicario	6	6

Third round
(United States) A Grossman	6	4	2
10	(France) N Tauziat	3	6	6
(Australia) L Field	2	1
4	(Spain) A Sánchez Vicario	6	6

Quarterfinals
10	(France) N Tauziat	3	2
4	(Spain) A Sánchez Vicario	6	6

==== Section 4 ====
First round
(France) K Quentrec	6	6
(Argentina) B Fulco	2	2
(Italy) L Ferrando	6	6
Q	(France) N Herreman	1	2
(United States) D Faber	3	6	6
16	(Soviet Union) L Savchenko	6	2	2
11	(Austria) B Paulus	6	6
(Argentina) M Paz	4	3
(Switzerland) E Krapl	2	0
Q	(United Kingdom) C Wood	6	6
(United States) K Rinaldi	6	6
(United States) C MacGregor	3	2

Second round
5	(Czechoslovakia) J Novotná	6	6
(France) K Quentrec	1	3
(Italy) L Ferrando	1	3
(United States) D Faber	6	6
11	(Austria) B Paulus	6	6
Q	(United Kingdom) C Wood	2	3
(United States) K Rinaldi	3	2
2	(Argentina) G Sabatini	6	6

Third round
5	(Czechoslovakia) J Novotná	6	6
(United States) D Faber	0	0
11	(Austria) B Paulus	5	0
2	(Argentina) G Sabatini	7	6

Quarterfinals
5	(Czechoslovakia) J Novotná	1	6	0
2	(Argentina) G Sabatini	6	3	6
