= 1992 NationsBank Classic – Doubles =

Doubles
- 1992 NationsBank Classic

Final
- Champions: (United States) Bret Garnett (United States) Jared Palmer
- Runners-up: (United States) Ken Flach (United States) Todd Witsken
- Score: 6–2, 6–3

Details
- Draw: 28 (4WC/1Q)
- Seeds: 8

Events
Singles	Doubles
← 1991 ·	Washington Open	· 1993 →

Scott Davis and David Pate were the defending champions, but none competed this year.

Bret Garnett and Jared Palmer won the title by defeating Ken Flach and Todd Witsken 6–2, 6–3 in the final.

== Seeds ==
The first four seeds received a bye into the second round.

1. (United States) Jim Grabb / (United States) Richey Reneberg (semifinals)
2. (United States) Kelly Jones / (United States) Rick Leach (semifinals)
3. (United States) Ken Flach / (United States) Todd Witsken (final)
4. (United States) Luke Jensen / (Australia) Laurie Warder (second round)
5. (Canada) Grant Connell / (Canada) Glenn Michibata (second round)
6. (United States) Patrick Galbraith / (United States) Sven Salumaa (first round)
7. (United States) Kevin Curren / (South Africa) Gary Muller (quarterfinals)
8. (United States) Shelby Cannon / (United States) Greg Van Emburgh (quarterfinals)

== Draw ==
=== Key ===
- Q = Qualifier
- WC = Wild card
- LL = Lucky loser
- Alt = Alternate
- SE = Special exempt
- PR = Protected ranking
- ITF = ITF entry
- JE = Junior exempt
- w/o = Walkover
- r = Retired
- d = Defaulted
- SR = Special ranking

=== Finals ===
Semifinals
1	(United States) Jim Grabb (United States) Richey Reneberg	5	7	3
(United States) Bret Garnett (United States) Jared Palmer	7	5	6
3	(United States) Ken Flach (United States) Todd Witsken	7	7
2	(United States) Kelly Jones (United States) Rick Leach	6	5

Final
(United States) Bret Garnett (United States) Jared Palmer	6	6
3	(United States) Ken Flach (United States) Todd Witsken	2	3

=== Top half ===
First round
Q	(United States) D Flach (United States) T Ho	6	1
(United States) F Montana (United States) B Pearce	7	6
(Australia) S Stolle (Australia) J Stoltenberg	7	7
(South Africa) R Deppe (South Africa) B Haygarth	6	5
(United States) D Eisenman (United States) K Thorne	7	3	3
8	(United States) S Cannon (United States) G Van Emburgh	6	6	6
(United States) B Garnett (United States) J Palmer	4	7	7
(United States) J Brown (Sweden) P Lundgren	6	6	5
(United States) M Keil (United States) D Randall	6	4	6
(United States) C Beckman (Australia) B Dyke	1	6	7
WC	(United States) B MacPhie (United States) A O'Brien	3	6	4
5	(Canada) G Connell (Canada) G Michibata	6	3	6

Second round
1	(United States) J Grabb (United States) R Reneberg	6	6
(United States) F Montana (United States) B Pearce	1	2
(Australia) S Stolle (Australia) J Stoltenberg	7	3	2
8	(United States) S Cannon (United States) G Van Emburgh	6	6	6
4	(United States) L Jensen (Australia) L Warder	2	1
(United States) B Garnett (United States) J Palmer	6	6
(United States) C Beckman (Australia) B Dyke	6	6
5	(Canada) G Connell (Canada) G Michibata	3	2

Quarterfinals
1	(United States) J Grabb (United States) R Reneberg	7	6
8	(United States) S Cannon (United States) G Van Emburgh	6	4
(United States) B Garnett (United States) J Palmer	6	7
(United States) C Beckman (Australia) B Dyke	4	6

Semifinals
1	(United States) J Grabb (United States) R Reneberg	5	7	3
(United States) B Garnett (United States) J Palmer	7	5	6

=== Bottom half ===
First round
6	(United States) P Galbraith (United States) S Salumaa	4	4
(Czechoslovakia) M Damm (Czechoslovakia) D Rikl	6	6
(United Kingdom) J Bates (Mexico) L Lavalle	6	6
(United States) TJ Middleton (United States) T Scherman	3	1
WC	(Israel) G Bloom (Israel) A Mansdorf	6	6
WC	(Sweden) B Borg (Sweden) N Kroon	3	1
7	(United States) K Curren (South Africa) G Muller	6	6
WC	(Mexico) L Herrera (France) G Raoux	3	2
(Czechoslovakia) P Korda (United States) I Lendl	5	6	6
(Sweden) H Holm (Italy) G Pozzi	7	3	7
(Australia) N Borwick (Australia) S Youl	7	6
(Germany) P Kühnen (Germany) A Mronz	6	2

Second round
(Czechoslovakia) M Damm (Czechoslovakia) D Rikl	w/o
(United Kingdom) J Bates (Mexico) L Lavalle
WC	(Israel) G Bloom (Israel) A Mansdorf	6	3	6
3	(United States) K Flach (United States) T Witsken	4	6	7
7	(United States) K Curren (South Africa) G Muller	6	7
(Sweden) H Holm (Italy) G Pozzi	3	5
(Australia) N Borwick (Australia) S Youl	4	2
2	(United States) K Jones (United States) R Leach	6	6

Quarterfinals
(Czechoslovakia) M Damm (Czechoslovakia) D Rikl	6	3
3	(United States) K Flach (United States) T Witsken	7	6
7	(United States) K Curren (South Africa) G Muller	3	6
2	(United States) K Jones (United States) R Leach	6	7

Semifinals
3	(United States) K Flach (United States) T Witsken	7	7
2	(United States) K Jones (United States) R Leach	6	5
