= 1988 Player's Canadian Open – Women's doubles =

Women's doubles
- 1988 Player's Canadian Open
- 1987 Champions: (United States) Zina Garrison (United States) Lori McNeil

Final
- Champions: (Czechoslovakia) Jana Novotná (Czechoslovakia) Helena Suková
- Runners-up: (United States) Zina Garrison (United States) Pam Shriver
- Score: 7–6^{(7–2)}, 7–6^{(8–6)}

Details
- Draw: 28
- Seeds: 8

Events
Singles	men	women
Doubles	men	women
- Canadian Open

Zina Garrison and Lori McNeil were the defending champions but they competed with different partners that year, Garrison with Pam Shriver and McNeil with Betsy Nagelsen.

McNeil and Nagelsen lost in the quarterfinals to Patty Fendick and Jill Hetherington.

Garrison and Shriver lost in the final 7–6^{(7–2)}, 7–6^{(8–6)} against Jana Novotná and Helena Suková.

== Seeds ==
Champion seeds are indicated in bold text while text in italics indicates the round in which those seeds were eliminated. The top four seeded teams received byes into the second round.

1. (United States) Zina Garrison / (United States) Pam Shriver (final)
2. (Czechoslovakia) **Jana Novotná** / (Czechoslovakia) **Helena Suková (champions)**
3. (Soviet Union) Larisa Savchenko / (Soviet Union) Natasha Zvereva (quarterfinals)
4. (United States) Lori McNeil / (United States) Betsy Nagelsen (quarterfinals)
5. (West Germany) Eva Pfaff / (Australia) Elizabeth Smylie (quarterfinals)
6. (Australia) Nicole Provis / (France) Catherine Suire (first round)
7. (Soviet Union) Natalia Bykova / (Soviet Union) Leila Meskhi (first round)
8. (France) Isabelle Demongeot / (France) Nathalie Tauziat (second round)

== Draw ==
Key

- Q = Qualifier
- WC = Wild card
- LL = Lucky loser
- Alt = Alternate
- ITF = ITF entry
- PR = Protected ranking
- SR = Special ranking
- SE = Special exempt
- JE = Junior exempt
- JR = Junior Accelerator Programme entrant
- CO = College Accelerator Programme entrant
- NG = Next Gen Accelerator Program entrant
- w/o = Walkover
- r = Retired
- d = Defaulted

=== Final ===
Final

1
- (United States) Zina Garrison
- (United States) Pam Shriver
6^{2}
6^{6}

2
- (Czechoslovakia) **Jana Novotná**
- (Czechoslovakia) **Helena Suková**
**7^{7}**
**7^{8}**

=== Top half ===
First round

Second round

Quarterfinals

Semifinals

1
- (United States) **Z Garrison**
- (United States) **P Shriver**
**6**
**6**

- (United States) J Blackstad
- (Japan) M Yanagi
2
2

- (Japan) A Nishiya
- (Japan) E Okagawa
1
3

- (Japan) **A Nishiya**
- (Japan) **E Okagawa**
**6**
**6**

1
- (United States) **Z Garrison**
- (United States) **P Shriver**
**7^{7}**
6^{5}
**6**

- (Canada) H Kelesi
- (Brazil) G Miró
0
1

- (Australia) J-A Faull
- (Australia) R McQuillan
6^{4}
**7^{7}**
3

- (Australia) **J-A Faull**
- (Australia) **R McQuillan**
**6**
**6**

- (Australia) **J-A Faull**
- (Australia) **R McQuillan**
**6**
0
**6**

- (Sweden) C Lindqvist
- (Australia) A Minter
**7**
4
2

8
- (France) I Demongeot
- (France) N Tauziat
3
**6**
3

8
- (France) **I Demongeot**
- (France) **N Tauziat**
5
**6**
**6**

1
- (United States) **Z Garrison**
- (United States) **P Shriver**
**w/o**

- (Poland) I Kuczyńska
- (United States) M Navratilova

3
- (Soviet Union) **L Savchenko**
- (Soviet Union) **N Zvereva**
**7^{8}**
**6**

- (Canada) **C Bassett-Seguso**
- (United States) **T Phelps**
**6**
**6**

- (Canada) C Bassett-Seguso
- (United States) T Phelps
6^{6}
2

- (Canada) M Drake
- (United States) J Ingram
2
0

3
- (Soviet Union) L Savchenko
- (Soviet Union) N Zvereva
6^{6}
4

- (Australia) **A Scott**
- (United States) **M Van Nostrand**
**6**
**6**

- (Poland) **I Kuczyńska**
- (United States) **M Navratilova**
**7^{8}**
**6**

- (United States) S Collins
- (United States) A Henricksson
1
2

- (Australia) A Scott
- (United States) M Van Nostrand
4
0

- (Poland) **I Kuczyńska**
- (United States) **M Navratilova**
**6**
**6**

- (Poland) **I Kuczyńska**
- (United States) **M Navratilova**
**6**
**6**

6
- (Australia) N Provis
- (France) C Suire
3
3

=== Bottom half ===
First round

Second round

Quarterfinals

Semifinals

7
- (Soviet Union) N Bykova
- (Soviet Union) L Meskhi
0
3

- (United States) **P Fendick**
- (Canada) **J Hetherington**
**6**
**6**

- (United States) **P Fendick**
- (Canada) **J Hetherington**
**7^{7}**
**6**

- (United States) E Alexander
- (Canada) C-L Cohen
2
1

- (United States) B Bowes
- (United States) M Werdel
6^{0}
0

- (United States) **B Bowes**
- (United States) **M Werdel**
**6**
**6**

- (United States) **P Fendick**
- (Canada) **J Hetherington**
**7**
**6**

- (Canada) **C Delisle**
- (United States) **J Klitch**
**7**
3
**6**

4
- (United States) L McNeil
- (United States) B Nagelsen
5
2

- (Canada) L Matthews
- (Canada) L Randmaa
5
**6**
4

- (Canada) C Delisle
- (United States) J Klitch
3
4

4
- (United States) **L McNeil**
- (United States) **B Nagelsen**
**6**
**6**

- (United States) P Fendick
- (Canada) J Hetherington
1
**6**
2

5
- (West Germany) **E Pfaff**
- (Australia) **E Smylie**
**6**
**6**

2
- (Czechoslovakia) **J Novotná**
- (Czechoslovakia) **H Suková**
**6**
4
**6**

- (United Kingdom) S Gomer
- (Australia) C Thompson
3
2

5
- (West Germany) **E Pfaff**
- (Australia) **E Smylie**
**7^{7}**
**6**

- (Japan) A Kijimuta
- (United States) T Mochizuki
0
3

- (New Zealand) B Cordwell
- (New Zealand) J Richardson
6^{2}
1

- (New Zealand) **B Cordwell**
- (New Zealand) **J Richardson**
**6**
**6**

5
- (West Germany) E Pfaff
- (Australia) E Smylie
2
5

- (Canada) R Simpson
- (Canada) J Young
2
0

2
- (Czechoslovakia) **J Novotná**
- (Czechoslovakia) **H Suková**
**6**
**7**

- (Switzerland) **E Krapl**
- (West Germany) **C Singer**
**6**
**6**

- (Switzerland) E Krapl
- (West Germany) C Singer
3
2

2
- (Czechoslovakia) **J Novotná**
- (Czechoslovakia) **H Suková**
**6**
**6**
