= Martin Barba =

Martin Barba may refer to:

- Martin Barba (tennis) (born 1966), American tennis player
- Martín Barba (born 1989), Mexican actor and singer
