= 1988 Player's Canadian Open – Women's singles =

Women's singles
- 1988 Player's Canadian Open
- 1987 Champion: (United States) Pam Shriver

Final
- Champion: (Argentina) Gabriela Sabatini
- Runner-up: (Soviet Union) Natasha Zvereva
- Score: 6–1, 6–2

Details
- Draw: 56
- Seeds: 16

Events
Singles	men	women
Doubles	men	women
- Canadian Open

Pam Shriver was the defending champion but lost in the semifinals to Natasha Zvereva.

Gabriela Sabatini won in the final 6–1, 6–2 against Zvereva.

== Seeds ==
A champion seed is indicated in bold text while text in italics indicates the round in which that seed was eliminated. The top eight seeds received a bye to the second round.

1. (United States) Martina Navratilova (quarterfinals)
2. (United States) Chris Evert (semifinals)
3. (United States) Pam Shriver (semifinals)
4. (Argentina) **Gabriela Sabatini (champion)**
5. (Czechoslovakia) Helena Suková (quarterfinals)
6. (Soviet Union) Natasha Zvereva (final)
7. (United States) Lori McNeil (quarterfinals)
8. (West Germany) ~~Claudia Kohde-Kilsch~~ (withdrew)
9. (United States) Zina Garrison (third round)
10. (United States) Barbara Potter (third round)
11. (West Germany) Sylvia Hanika (third round)
12. (Soviet Union) Larisa Savchenko (second round)
13. (Canada) Helen Kelesi (third round)
14. (Australia) Anne Minter (first round)

== Draw ==
Key

- Q = Qualifier
- WC = Wild card
- LL = Lucky loser
- Alt = Alternate
- ITF = ITF entry
- PR = Protected ranking
- SR = Special ranking
- SE = Special exempt
- JE = Junior exempt
- JR = Junior Accelerator Programme entrant
- CO = College Accelerator Programme entrant
- NG = Next Gen Accelerator Program entrant
- w/o = Walkover
- r = Retired
- d = Defaulted

=== Finals ===
Semifinals
6	(Soviet Union) **Natasha Zvereva**	**7**	**6**
3	(United States) Pam Shriver	5	3
4	(Argentina) **Gabriela Sabatini**	**6**	**6**
2	(United States) Chris Evert	4	3

Final
6	(Soviet Union) Natasha Zvereva	1	2
4	(Argentina) **Gabriela Sabatini**	**6**	**6**

=== Top half ===
==== Section 1 ====
First round
(United States) **S Mascarin**	**6**	**6**
Q	(United States) J Ingram	2	2
(Soviet Union) N Bykova	0	3
LL	(New Zealand) **J Richardson**	**6**	**6**
(Soviet Union) L Meskhi	1	5
11	(West Germany) **S Hanika**	**6**	**7**
(Canada) J Young	2	4
Q	(United States) **M Van Nostrand**	**6**	**6**
(Australia) **N Provis**	**7**	**6**
(Canada) M Drake	5	2
(Poland) **I Kuczyńska**	**6**	**6**
(Australia) E Smylie	1	4

Second round
1	(United States) **M Navratilova**	**6**	**6**
(United States) S Mascarin	2	2
LL	(New Zealand) J Richardson	2	4
11	(West Germany) **S Hanika**	**6**	**6**
Q	(United States) M Van Nostrand	2	**7**	5
(Australia) **N Provis**	**6**	6	**7**
(Poland) I Kuczyńska	1	2
6	(Soviet Union) **N Zvereva**	**6**	**6**

Third round
1	(United States) **M Navratilova**	**6**	**6**
11	(West Germany) S Hanika	1	1
(Australia) N Provis	4	0
6	(Soviet Union) **N Zvereva**	**6**	**6**

Quarterfinals
1	(United States) M Navratilova	1	4
6	(Soviet Union) **N Zvereva**	**6**	**6**

==== Section 2 ====
First round
Q	(Canada) C-L Cohen	1	3
(Switzerland) **E Krapl**	**6**	**6**
(United States) B Nagelsen	4	0
(United States) **M Torres**	**6**	**6**
(France) **N Tauziat**	**6**	5	**6**
14	(Australia) A Minter	1	**7**	2
10	(United States) **B Potter**	**6**	**6**
(West Germany) C Singer	1	4
(Canada) **C Bassett-Seguso**	**6**	**6**
(United States) K Adams	2	1
(United States) **T Phelps**	**6**	**6**
(West Germany) E Pfaff	2	2

Second round
3	(United States) **P Shriver**	**6**	**6**
(Switzerland) E Krapl	4	2
(United States) M Torres	3	1
(France) **N Tauziat**	**6**	**6**
10	(United States) **B Potter**	**7**	**6**
(Canada) C Bassett-Seguso	6	3
(United States) **T Phelps**	**6**	**6**
LL	(Japan) A Nishiya	2	3

Third round
3	(United States) **P Shriver**	**7**	**6**
(France) N Tauziat	6	4
10	(United States) B Potter	0	**6**	0
(United States) **T Phelps**	**6**	3	**6**

Quarterfinals
3	(United States) **P Shriver**	**7**	**6**
(United States) T Phelps	6	4

=== Bottom half ===
==== Section 3 ====
First round
Q	(United States) **S Collins**	**7**	**6**
Q	(Australia) J-A Faull	6	2
(France) **J Halard**	**6**	**6**
(United Kingdom) S Gomer	2	3
(France) C Suire	3	4
13	(Canada) **H Kelesi**	**6**	**6**
9	(United States) **Z Garrison**	**6**	**6**
(Brazil) G Miró	1	2
(New Zealand) **B Cordwell**	3	**6**	**6**
(United States) B Bowes	**6**	3	1
Q	(United States) **S Martin**	**6**	**6**
(United States) H Cioffi	4	3

Second round
7	(United States) **L McNeil**	**6**	**6**
Q	(United States) S Collins	3	4
(France) J Halard	2	2
13	(Canada) **H Kelesi**	**6**	**6**
9	(United States) **Z Garrison**	**6**	**6**
(New Zealand) B Cordwell	0	2
Q	(United States) S Martin	2	2
4	(Argentina) **G Sabatini**	**6**	**6**

Third round
7	(United States) **L McNeil**	2	**6**	**6**
13	(Canada) H Kelesi	**6**	4	2
9	(United States) Z Garrison	1	4
4	(Argentina) **G Sabatini**	**6**	**6**

Quarterfinals
7	(United States) L McNeil	3	3
4	(Argentina) **G Sabatini**	**6**	**6**

==== Section 4 ====
First round
(United States) **M Werdel**	**7**	**6**
(Australia) J Byrne	6	1
(Japan) **M Yanagi**	**6**	**6**
Q	(Peru) P Vásquez	2	2
(Sweden) **C Lindqvist**	5	**6**	**7**
(United States) A Henricksson	**7**	3	6
12	(Soviet Union) **L Savchenko**	**6**	**6**
Q	(Japan) E Okagawa	1	3
(Canada) J Hetherington	4	2
(France) **I Demongeot**	**6**	**6**
(Canada) **R Simpson**	1	**6**	**6**
(Japan) A Kijimuta	**6**	3	4

Second round
5	(Czechoslovakia) **H Suková**	**6**	**6**
(United States) M Werdel	3	4
(Japan) M Yanagi	3	4
(Sweden) **C Lindqvist**	**6**	**6**
12	(Soviet Union) L Savchenko	5	1
(France) **I Demongeot**	**7**	**6**
(Canada) R Simpson	1	2
2	(United States) **C Evert**	**6**	**6**

Third round
5	(Czechoslovakia) **H Suková**	**6**	**6**
(Sweden) C Lindqvist	3	0
(France) I Demongeot	4	2
2	(United States) **C Evert**	**6**	**6**

Quarterfinals
5	(Czechoslovakia) H Suková	2	1
2	(United States) **C Evert**	**6**	**6**
