= 1993 Newsweek Tennis Classic – Singles =

Singles
- 1993 Newsweek Tennis Classic

Final
- Champion: (Israel) Amos Mansdorf
- Runner-up: (United States) Todd Martin
- Score: 7–6^{(7–3)}, 7–5

Details
- Draw: 56 (5WC/7Q/1LL)
- Seeds: 16

Events
Singles	Doubles
- Washington Open

Petr Korda was the defending champion, but lost in the quarterfinals to Amos Mansdorf.

Mansdorf won the title by defeating Todd Martin 7–6^{(7–3)}, 7–5 in the final.

== Seeds ==
The first eight seeds received a bye to the second round.

1. (United States) Ivan Lendl (second round)
2. (Czech Republic) Petr Korda (quarterfinals)
3. (United States) MaliVai Washington (quarterfinals)
4. (Sweden) Henrik Holm (second round)
5. (Russia) Alexander Volkov (second round)
6. (United States) Andre Agassi (third round)
7. (United States) Todd Martin (final)
8. (Israel) Amos Mansdorf (champion)
9. (United States) Brad Gilbert (first round)
10. (Sweden) Christian Bergström (first round)
11. (United States) Richey Reneberg (semifinals)
12. (New Zealand) Brett Steven (first round)
13. (United States) Derrick Rostagno (second round)
14. (Peru) Jaime Yzaga (second round)
15. (Switzerland) Jakob Hlasek (third round)
16. (Australia) Jamie Morgan (second round)

== Draw ==
Key

- Q = Qualifier
- WC = Wild card
- LL = Lucky loser
- Alt = Alternate
- ITF = ITF entry
- PR = Protected ranking
- SR = Special ranking
- SE = Special exempt
- JE = Junior exempt
- JR = Junior Accelerator Programme entrant
- CO = College Accelerator Programme entrant
- NG = Next Gen Accelerator Program entrant
- w/o = Walkover
- r = Retired
- d = Defaulted

=== Finals ===
Quarterfinals
(Japan) Shuzo Matsuoka	3	3
7	(United States) Todd Martin	6	6
(Italy) Gianluca Pozzi	3	0
(United States) Aaron Krickstein	6	6
11	(United States) Richey Reneberg	7	6
3	(United States) MaliVai Washington	5	4
8	(Israel) Amos Mansdorf	6	6
2	(Czech Republic) Petr Korda	3	3

Semifinals
7	(United States) Todd Martin	6	7
(United States) Aaron Krickstein	3	5
11	(United States) Richey Reneberg	4	6	1
8	(Israel) Amos Mansdorf	6	4	6

Final
7	(United States) Todd Martin	6^{3}	5
8	(Israel) Amos Mansdorf	7^{7}	7

=== Top half ===
==== Section 1 ====
First round
Q	(United States) B Garnett	3	2
(United States) R Weiss	6	6
WC	(United States) J Roddick	2	3
(Japan) S Matsuoka	6	6
(Mexico) L Herrera	6^{2}	2
16	(Australia) J Morgan	7^{7}	6
9	(United States) B Gilbert	6	3	4
(Portugal) J Cunha e Silva	4	6	6
WC	(United States) P McEnroe	6	6
Q	(United States) M Sell	2	2
(Colombia) M Hadad	1	6	6
Q	(United States) B Pearce	6	2	4

Second round
1	(United States) I Lendl	6	6^{5}	4
(United States) R Weiss	2	7^{7}	6
(Japan) S Matsuoka	6	6^{3}	6
16	(Australia) J Morgan	3	7^{7}	4
(Portugal) J Cunha e Silva	6^{4}	2
WC	(United States) P McEnroe	7^{7}	6
(Colombia) M Hadad	3	3
7	(United States) T Martin	6	6

Third round
(United States) R Weiss	4	4
(Japan) S Matsuoka	6	6
WC	(United States) P McEnroe	3	7^{7}	2
7	(United States) T Martin	6	6^{5}	6

Quarterfinals
(Japan) S Matsuoka	3	3
7	(United States) T Martin	6	6

==== Section 2 ====
First round
(Italy) G Pozzi	3	6	7^{8}
(Czech Republic) M Damm	6	2	6^{6}
Q	(South Africa) D Nainkin	4	6	6
(United States) K Thorne	6	4	3
(South Africa) G Stafford	3	3
13	(United States) D Rostagno	6	6
12	(New Zealand) B Steven	4	2
(United States) A Krickstein	6	6
(Germany) C Saceanu	4	6	5
(Germany) P Baur	6	4	7
(Haiti) R Agénor	7	6^{6}	6^{4}
LL	(Sweden) J Carlsson	5	7^{8}	7^{7}

Second round
4	(Sweden) H Holm	6	6^{4}	4
(Italy) G Pozzi	3	7^{7}	6
Q	(South Africa) D Nainkin	6	6
13	(United States) D Rostagno	0	3
(United States) A Krickstein	6^{5}	6	6
(Germany) P Baur	7^{7}	4	2
LL	(Sweden) J Carlsson	3	2
6	(United States) A Agassi	6	6

Third round
(Italy) G Pozzi	7^{9}	6
Q	(South Africa) D Nainkin	6^{7}	4
(United States) A Krickstein	4	6	6
6	(United States) A Agassi	6	3	4

Quarterfinals
(Italy) G Pozzi	6	6
(United States) A Krickstein	3	0

=== Bottom half ===
==== Section 3 ====
First round
Q	(South Africa) M Kaplan	6^{9}	3
Q	(The Bahamas) M Knowles	7^{11}	6
(Austria) A Antonitsch	6	6
WC	(United States) S Humphries	2	2
(Australia) N Borwick	1	6^{2}
11	(United States) R Reneberg	6	7^{7}
14	(Peru) J Yzaga	7^{7}	6
(United Kingdom) J Bates	6^{3}	3
(United States) J Tarango	6	5	6
(United States) B Shelton	2	7	3
(Brazil) L Mattar	6	6
(United States) T Ho	1	2

Second round
5	(Russia) A Volkov	3	3
Q	(The Bahamas) M Knowles	6	6
(Austria) A Antonitsch	6^{5}	6	1
11	(United States) R Reneberg	7^{7}	2	6
14	(Peru) J Yzaga	1	6^{6}
(United States) J Tarango	6	7^{8}
(Brazil) L Mattar	3	2
3	(United States) MV Washington	6	6

Third round
Q	(The Bahamas) M Knowles	3	2
11	(United States) R Reneberg	6	6
(United States) J Tarango	3	1
3	(United States) MV Washington	6	6

Quarterfinals
11	(United States) R Reneberg	7	6
3	(United States) MV Washington	5	4

==== Section 4 ====
First round
(Israel) G Bloom	1	3
(United States) C Adams	6	6
(United States) C Garner	3	2
(South Africa) C van Rensburg	6	6
(Australia) S Stolle	2	6	6
10	(Sweden) C Bergström	6	2	3
15	(Switzerland) J Hlasek	6	2	6
(West Germany) M Zoecke	2	6	2
(Zimbabwe) B Black	6	6
WC	(United States) V Spadea	3	3
Q	(United States) D Randall	6^{5}	6	3
WC	(United States) B MacPhie	7^{7}	4	6

Second round
8	(Israel) A Mansdorf	6	3	6
(United States) C Adams	3	6	2
(South Africa) C van Rensburg	1	5
(Australia) S Stolle	6	7
15	(Switzerland) J Hlasek	6	6
(Zimbabwe) B Black	2	3
WC	(United States) B MacPhie	4	6	3
2	(Czech Republic) P Korda	6	1	6

Third round
8	(Israel) A Mansdorf	6	6
(Australia) S Stolle	4	2
15	(Switzerland) J Hlasek	6^{3}	6^{3}
2	(Czech Republic) P Korda	7^{7}	7^{7}

Quarterfinals
8	(Israel) A Mansdorf	6	6
2	(Czech Republic) P Korda	3	3
