= Miles Walker (tennis) =

American tennis player

- Full name: Miles Stephen Walker
- Country (sports): United States
- Born: 1961 (age 63–64) San Francisco, California

Singles
- Career record: 0–1
- Highest ranking: No. 363 (Aug 8, 1988)

Doubles
- Career record: 0–1
- Highest ranking: No. 544 (Sep 17, 1990)

Miles Stephen Walker (born 1961) is an American former professional tennis player.

Walker played varsity tennis for Chapman College and won the 1988 NCAA Division II singles title. He had returned to Chapman after leaving tennis in 1980 and playing little competitive tennis for the next six years.

On the professional tour he featured mostly in satellite events, with his biggest tournament appearance the 1989 Canadian Open, where he was a main draw qualifier. He was beaten in the first round by Grant Connell.
