= 1992 NationsBank Classic – Singles =

Singles
- 1992 NationsBank Classic

Final
- Champion: (Czechoslovakia) Petr Korda
- Runner-up: (Sweden) Henrik Holm
- Score: 6–4, 6–4

Details
- Draw: 56 (5WC/7Q)
- Seeds: 16

Events
Singles	Doubles
- Washington Open

Andre Agassi was the defending champion, but lost in the second round to Kevin Curren.

Petr Korda won the title by defeating Henrik Holm 6–4, 6–4 in the final.

== Seeds ==
The first eight seeds received a bye into the second round.

1. (Czechoslovakia) Petr Korda (champion)
2. (United States) Andre Agassi (second round)
3. (United States) Ivan Lendl (quarterfinals)
4. (United States) Aaron Krickstein (second round)
5. (United States) John McEnroe (second round)
6. (United States) MaliVai Washington (semifinals)
7. (United States) Derrick Rostagno (semifinals)
8. (Israel) Amos Mansdorf (quarterfinals)
9. (Australia) Wally Masur (third round)
10. (Italy) Gianluca Pozzi (second round)
11. (Germany) Markus Zoecke (first round)
12. (United States) Richey Reneberg (first round)
13. (Mexico) Luis Herrera (first round)
14. (United States) Jim Grabb (third round)
15. (Australia) Jason Stoltenberg (second round)
16. (Mexico) Leonardo Lavalle (second round)

== Draw ==
Key

- Q = Qualifier
- WC = Wild card
- LL = Lucky loser
- Alt = Alternate
- ITF = ITF entry
- PR = Protected ranking
- SR = Special ranking
- SE = Special exempt
- JE = Junior exempt
- JR = Junior Accelerator Programme entrant
- CO = College Accelerator Programme entrant
- NG = Next Gen Accelerator Program entrant
- w/o = Walkover
- r = Retired
- d = Defaulted

=== Finals ===
Quarterfinals
1	(Czechoslovakia) Petr Korda	7^{10}	6
8	(Israel) Amos Mansdorf	6^{8}	2
(France) Guillaume Raoux	6^{4}	6^{8}
6	(United States) MaliVai Washington	7^{7}	7^{10}
(Sweden) Henrik Holm	3	6	6
3	(United States) Ivan Lendl	6	3	3
7	(United States) Derrick Rostagno	6	6^{7}	7^{7}
(South Africa) Gary Muller	1	7^{9}	6^{5}

Semifinals
1	(Czechoslovakia) Petr Korda	7^{7}	6
6	(United States) MaliVai Washington	6^{1}	0
(Sweden) Henrik Holm	6	6
7	(United States) Derrick Rostagno	4	3

Final
1	(Czechoslovakia) Petr Korda	6	6
(Sweden) Henrik Holm	4	4

=== Top half ===
==== Section 1 ====
First round
Q	(United States) J Brown	6	4	6
(Canada) M Laurendeau	4	6	4
(Italy) C Caratti	3	3
(Austria) A Antonitsch	6	6
(Australia) S Youl	4	6^{3}
16	(Mexico) L Lavalle	6	7^{7}
9	(Australia) W Masur	4	6	6
(Germany) A Thoms	6	2	2
Q	(United States) D Randall	6	6^{5}	6
Q	(United States) B Garnett	4	7^{7}	2
(Haiti) R Agénor	2	6	6
(Germany) K Braasch	6	2	0

Second round
1	(Czechoslovakia) P Korda	4	6	6
Q	(United States) J Brown	6	2	3
(Austria) A Antonitsch	4	6	6
16	(Mexico) L Lavalle	6	0	2
9	(Australia) W Masur	6	7
Q	(United States) D Randall	2	5
(Haiti) R Agénor	2	0
8	(Israel) A Mansdorf	6	6

Third round
1	(Czechoslovakia) P Korda	6	7
(Austria) A Antonitsch	3	5
9	(Australia) W Masur	3	4
8	(Israel) A Mansdorf	6	6

Quarterfinals
1	(Czechoslovakia) P Korda	7^{10}	6
8	(Israel) A Mansdorf	6^{8}	2

==== Section 2 ====
First round
(United States) J Stark	4	2
(France) G Raoux	6	6
Q	(United States) K Flach	5	2
(Sweden) P Lundgren	7	6
(South Africa) M Ondruska	7	6
13	(Mexico) L Herrera	5	1
11	(Germany) M Zoecke	6	2	1
(Czechoslovakia) M Damm	4	6	6
(Canada) C Pridham	4	6	1
Q	(United States) J Arias	6	3	6
(Sweden) T Högstedt	6	7^{7}
WC	(Sweden) B Borg	4	6^{5}

Second round
4	(United States) A Krickstein	5	6	3
(France) G Raoux	7	2	6
(Sweden) P Lundgren	6	6^{2}	1
(South Africa) M Ondruska	3	7^{7}	6
(Czechoslovakia) M Damm	6^{4}	3
Q	(United States) J Arias	7^{7}	6
(Sweden) T Högstedt	5	0
6	(United States) MV Washington	7	6

Third round
(France) G Raoux	6	6
(South Africa) M Ondruska	4	2
Q	(United States) J Arias	6	2	3
6	(United States) MV Washington	3	6	6

Quarterfinals
(France) G Raoux	6^{4}	6^{8}
6	(United States) MV Washington	7^{7}	7^{10}

=== Bottom half ===
==== Section 3 ====
First round
(United Kingdom) J Bates	7^{16}	6
(United States) F Montana	6^{14}	3
(United States) T Martin	6	6
(United States) T Witsken	3	1
(Sweden) H Holm	6	6
12	(United States) R Reneberg	1	3
14	(United States) J Grabb	6	3	6
WC	(United States) B MacPhie	4	6	3
WC	(United States) A O'Brien	4	7^{7}	7^{7}
(United States) C Adams	6	6^{2}	6^{4}
(Australia) S Stolle	2	4
WC	(United States) J Palmer	6	6

Second round
5	(United States) J McEnroe	2	6	4
(United Kingdom) J Bates	6	1	6
(United States) T Martin	6^{4}	5
(Sweden) H Holm	7^{7}	7
14	(United States) J Grabb	6	6
WC	(United States) A O'Brien	3	2
WC	(United States) J Palmer	4	1
3	(United States) I Lendl	6	6

Third round
(United Kingdom) J Bates	5	0^{r}
(Sweden) H Holm	7	3
14	(United States) J Grabb	1	6^{2}
3	(United States) I Lendl	6	7^{7}

Quarterfinals
(Sweden) H Holm	3	6	6
3	(United States) I Lendl	6	3	3

==== Section 4 ====
First round
Q	(United States) S Bryan	1	3
(Germany) P Kühnen	6	6
Q	(South Africa) R Koenig	7	4	7^{7}
(Israel) G Bloom	5	6	6^{5}
(Czechoslovakia) D Rikl	2	1
10	(Italy) G Pozzi	6	6
15	(Australia) J Stoltenberg	6	6^{5}	6
(United States) R Weiss	4	7^{7}	4
(South Africa) G Muller	6	6^{8}	7^{7}
(Canada) G Connell	3	7^{10}	6^{5}
(Germany) A Mronz	7^{7}	6^{7}	4
(United States) K Curren	6^{5}	7^{9}	6

Second round
7	(United States) D Rostagno	6	6^{4}	6
(Germany) P Kühnen	3	7^{7}	3
Q	(South Africa) R Koenig	3	6	6
10	(Italy) G Pozzi	6	4	4
15	(Australia) J Stoltenberg	1	6^{4}
(South Africa) G Muller	6	7^{7}
(United States) K Curren	7	6
2/WC	(United States) A Agassi	5	4

Third round
7	(United States) D Rostagno	7^{7}	6
Q	(South Africa) R Koenig	6^{1}	4
(South Africa) G Muller	4	6	7^{7}
(United States) K Curren	6	3	6^{4}

Quarterfinals
7	(United States) D Rostagno	6	6^{7}	7^{7}
(South Africa) G Muller	1	7^{9}	6^{5}
