= 1988 Player's Canadian Open – Men's doubles =

Men's doubles
- 1988 Player's Canadian Open

Final
- Champions: (United States) Ken Flach (United States) Robert Seguso
- Runners-up: (United Kingdom) Andrew Castle (United States) Tim Wilkison
- Score: 7–6^{(7–3)}, 6–3

Details
- Draw: 28 (3WC/1Alt)
- Seeds: 8

Events
| Singles | men | women |
| Doubles | men | women |
| ← 1987 · | Canadian Open | · 1989 → |

Pat Cash and Stefan Edberg were the defending champions, but lost in the quarterfinals to Andrew Castle and Tim Wilkison.

Ken Flach and Robert Seguso won the title by defeating Castle and Wilkison 7–6^{(7–3)}, 6–3 in the final.

== Seeds ==
The first four seeds received a bye into the second round.

1. (United States) Ken Flach / (United States) Robert Seguso (champions)
2. (Australia) John Fitzgerald / (Sweden) Anders Järryd (second round, withdrew)
3. (Mexico) Jorge Lozano / (United States) Todd Witsken (second round)
4. (United States) Rick Leach / (United States) Jim Pugh (second round)
5. (New Zealand) Kelly Evernden / (Australia) Laurie Warder (quarterfinals)
6. (Australia) Wally Masur / (Australia) Mark Woodforde (semifinals)
7. (Australia) Pat Cash / (Sweden) Stefan Edberg (quarterfinals)
8. (United States) Kevin Curren / (United States) Steve Denton (second round)

== Draw ==
=== Key ===
- Q = Qualifier
- WC = Wild card
- LL = Lucky loser
- Alt = Alternate
- SE = Special exempt
- PR = Protected ranking
- ITF = ITF entry
- JE = Junior exempt
- w/o = Walkover
- r = Retired
- d = Defaulted
- SR = Special ranking

=== Finals ===
Semifinals
1 | (United States) Ken Flach (United States) Robert Seguso | 6 | 5 | 6
(United States) Scott Davis (Switzerland) Jakob Hlasek | 3 | 7 | 4
6 | (Australia) Wally Masur (Australia) Mark Woodforde | 7 | 4 | 4
(United Kingdom) Andrew Castle (United States) Tim Wilkison | 5 | 6 | 6

Final
1 | (United States) Ken Flach (United States) Robert Seguso | 7^{7} | 6
(United Kingdom) Andrew Castle (United States) Tim Wilkison | 6^{3} | 3

=== Top half ===
First round
(France) JP Fleurian (Australia) J Frawley | 3 | 2
(United States) S DeVries (United States) R Matuszewski | 6 | 6
(United States) M Anger (United States) G Holmes | 6^{3} | 4
(United States) J Rive (United States) L Shiras | 7^{7} | 6
(United States) G Donnelly (United States) J Ross | 4 | 6 | 4
8 | (United States) K Curren (United States) S Denton | 6 | 3 | 6
(United States) S Davis (Switzerland) J Hlasek | 6 | 6
WC | (Canada) Pierre Dufour (Canada) B Gyetko | 3 | 0
(United States) P Chamberlin (United States) M Dickson | 6 | 6
(United States) J Grabb (United States) P McEnroe | 4 | 4
(United States) M Flur (United States) S Giammalva Jr. | 4 | 4
5 | (New Zealand) K Evernden (Australia) L Warder | 6 | 6

Second round
1 | (United States) K Flach (United States) R Seguso | 6 | 6
(United States) S DeVries (United States) R Matuszewski | 4 | 4
(United States) J Rive (United States) L Shiras | 7^{7} | 6^{5} | 6
8 | (United States) K Curren (United States) S Denton | 6^{5} | 7^{7} | 3
4 | (United States) R Leach (United States) J Pugh | 6^{4} | 3
(United States) S Davis (Switzerland) J Hlasek | 7^{7} | 6
(United States) P Chamberlin (United States) M Dickson | 4 | 6^{8}
5 | (New Zealand) K Evernden (Australia) L Warder | 6 | 7^{10}

Quarterfinals
1 | (United States) K Flach (United States) R Seguso | 7^{7} | 4 | 6
(United States) J Rive (United States) L Shiras | 6^{4} | 6 | 0
(United States) S Davis (Switzerland) J Hlasek | 6 | 7
5 | (New Zealand) K Evernden (Australia) L Warder | 3 | 5

Semifinals
1 | (United States) K Flach (United States) R Seguso | 6 | 5 | 6
(United States) S Davis (Switzerland) J Hlasek | 3 | 7 | 4

=== Bottom half ===
First round
6 | (Australia) W Masur (Australia) M Woodforde | 7^{7} | 6
(United States) M Basham (United States) C Beckman | 6^{0} | 4
(Sweden) P Lundgren (United States) T Nelson | 6 | 3 | 1
(Australia) C Limberger (Australia) S Youl | 2 | 6 | 6
(Ecuador) A Gómez (Socialist Federal Republic of Yugoslavia) S Živojinović | 4 | 6^{5}
(Canada) G Connell (Canada) G Michibata | 6 | 7^{7}
7 | (Australia) P Cash (Sweden) S Edberg | 6 | 6
Alt | (Australia) P Carter (New Zealand) D Lewis | 1 | 3
(United States) M Davis (United States) T Pawsat | 4 | 6 | 6
WC | (United States) P Fleming (Canada) A Sznajder | 6 | 3 | 4
WC | (Canada) M Greenan (Canada) M Laurendeau | 2 | 2
(United Kingdom) A Castle (United States) T Wilkison | 6 | 6

Second round
6 | (Australia) W Masur (Australia) M Woodforde | 6 | 7^{10}
(Australia) C Limberger (Australia) S Youl | 3 | 6^{8}
(Canada) G Connell (Canada) G Michibata | 6^{4} | 6 | 7^{7}
3 | (Mexico) J Lozano (United States) T Witsken | 7^{7} | 3 | 6^{2}
7 | (Australia) P Cash (Sweden) S Edberg | 6^{0} | 7^{7} | 6
(United States) M Davis (United States) T Pawsat | 7^{7} | 6^{3} | 2
(United Kingdom) A Castle (United States) T Wilkison | w/o
2 | (Australia) J Fitzgerald (Sweden) A Järryd

Quarterfinals
6 | (Australia) W Masur (Australia) M Woodforde | 7 | 6
(Canada) G Connell (Canada) G Michibata | 5 | 3
7 | (Australia) P Cash (Sweden) S Edberg | 4 | 4
(United Kingdom) A Castle (United States) T Wilkison | 6 | 6

Semifinals
6 | (Australia) W Masur (Australia) M Woodforde | 7 | 4 | 4
(United Kingdom) A Castle (United States) T Wilkison | 5 | 6 | 6
