= 1989 Player's Canadian Open – Women's doubles =

Women's doubles
- 1989 Player's Canadian Open

Final
- Champions: (United States) Gigi Fernández (United States) Robin White
- Runners-up: (United States) Martina Navratilova (Soviet Union) Larisa Savchenko
- Score: 6–1, 7–5

Details
- Draw: 28
- Seeds: 8

Events
Singles	men	women
Doubles	men	women
- Canadian Open

Jana Novotná and Helena Suková were the defending champions, but Suková did not compete this year. Novotná teamed up with Eva Pfaff and lost in the quarterfinals to Elizabeth Smylie and Janine Tremelling.

Gigi Fernández and Robin White won the title by defeating Martina Navratilova and Larisa Savchenko 6–1, 7–5 in the final.

== Seeds ==
The first four seeds received a bye to the second round.

1. (United States) Martina Navratilova / (Soviet Union) Larisa Savchenko (final)
2. (United States) Gigi Fernández / (United States) Robin White (champions)
3. (Canada) Jill Hetherington / (Australia) Hana Mandlíková (semifinals)
4. (Czechoslovakia) Jana Novotná / (West Germany) Eva Pfaff (quarterfinals)
5. (Australia) Elizabeth Smylie / (Australia) Janine Tremelling (semifinals)
6. (France) Isabelle Demongeot / (France) Nathalie Tauziat (first round)
7. (Soviet Union) Leila Meskhi / (Soviet Union) Natasha Zvereva (quarterfinals)
8. (Spain) Arantxa Sánchez Vicario / (Austria) Judith Wiesner (second round)

== Draw ==
Key

- Q = Qualifier
- WC = Wild card
- LL = Lucky loser
- Alt = Alternate
- ITF = ITF entry
- PR = Protected ranking
- SR = Special ranking
- SE = Special exempt
- JE = Junior exempt
- JR = Junior Accelerator Programme entrant
- CO = College Accelerator Programme entrant
- NG = Next Gen Accelerator Program entrant
- w/o = Walkover
- r = Retired
- d = Defaulted

=== Finals ===
Semifinals
1	(United States) Martina Navratilova (Soviet Union) Larisa Savchenko	6	6
3	(Canada) Jill Hetherington (Australia) Hana Mandlíková	2	3
5	(Australia) Elizabeth Smylie (Australia) Janine Tremelling	7	1	4
2	(United States) Gigi Fernández (United States) Robin White	6	6	6

Final
1	(United States) Martina Navratilova (Soviet Union) Larisa Savchenko	1	5
2	(United States) Gigi Fernández (United States) Robin White	6	7

=== Top half ===
First round
(Austria) B Paulus (Czechoslovakia) R Zrubáková	6	6
(Soviet Union) N Medvedeva (Czechoslovakia) E Švíglerová	3	1
(United States) H Na (United States) J Thomas	6	6	2
(United States) A Grousbeck (Japan) N Miyagi	2	7	6
(Australia) JA Faull (Australia) R McQuillan	6	7
6	(France) I Demongeot (France) N Tauziat	4	5
(United Kingdom) S Gomer (Japan) E Iida	1	0
(Canada) H Kelesi (United States) K Rinaldi	6	6
(Canada) R Simpson (Canada) Mandy Wilson	6	6
(United States) Heidi Rosenbaum (United States) Kilmeny Waterman	2	1
(Canada) M Drake (Canada) Laura Randmaa	1	3
7	(Soviet Union) L Meskhi (Soviet Union) N Zvereva	6	6

Second round
1	(United States) M Navratilova (Soviet Union) L Savchenko	6	6
(Austria) B Paulus (Czechoslovakia) R Zrubáková	1	1
(United States) A Grousbeck (Japan) N Miyagi	7	6
(Australia) JA Faull (Australia) R McQuillan	5	1
3	(Canada) J Hetherington (Australia) H Mandlíková	6	0	6
(Canada) H Kelesi (United States) K Rinaldi	4	6	2
(Canada) R Simpson (Canada) M Wilson	0	4
7	(Soviet Union) L Meskhi (Soviet Union) N Zvereva	6	6

Quarterfinals
1	(United States) M Navratilova (Soviet Union) L Savchenko	7	6
(United States) A Grousbeck (Japan) N Miyagi	6	1
3	(Canada) J Hetherington (Australia) H Mandlíková	6	6
7	(Soviet Union) L Meskhi (Soviet Union) N Zvereva	1	3

Semifinals
1	(United States) M Navratilova (Soviet Union) L Savchenko	6	6
3	(Canada) J Hetherington (Australia) H Mandlíková	2	3

=== Bottom half ===
First round
5	(Australia) E Smylie (Australia) J Tremelling	6	6
(Czechoslovakia) P Langrová (Australia) A Scott	1	3
(Canada) S Italiano (Poland) M Mróz	3	2
(Czechoslovakia) J Pospíšilová (Czechoslovakia) R Rajchrtová	6	6
(Australia) L Field (United States) C MacGregor	7	6
(Italy) L Ferrando (Switzerland) E Krapl	6	3
8	(Spain) A Sánchez Vicario (Austria) J Wiesner	6	6
(Canada) Monica Kowaleski (Canada) J Young	1	1
(Australia) A Minter (United States) M Van Nostrand	6	6
(United States) D Faber (Argentina) B Fulco	4	2
(United States) A Grossman (United States) S Stafford	6	7
(Canada) C Bassett-Seguso (France) C Tanvier	3	6

Second round
5	(Australia) E Smylie (Australia) J Tremelling	6	6
(Czechoslovakia) J Pospíšilová (Czechoslovakia) R Rajchrtová	2	1
(Australia) L Field (United States) C MacGregor	3	1
4	(Czechoslovakia) J Novotná (West Germany) E Pfaff	6	6
8	(Spain) A Sánchez Vicario (Austria) J Wiesner	3	6
(Australia) A Minter (United States) M Van Nostrand	6	7
(United States) A Grossman (United States) S Stafford	4	7	3
2	(United States) G Fernández (United States) R White	6	5	6

Quarterfinals
5	(Australia) E Smylie (Australia) J Tremelling	6	6
4	(Czechoslovakia) J Novotná (West Germany) E Pfaff	2	3
(Australia) A Minter (United States) M Van Nostrand	1	1
2	(United States) G Fernández (United States) R White	6	6

Semifinals
5	(Australia) E Smylie (Australia) J Tremelling	7	1	4
2	(United States) G Fernández (United States) R White	6	6	6
