= 1991 Sovran Bank Classic – Doubles =

Doubles
- 1991 Sovran Bank Classic

Final
- Champions: (United States) Scott Davis (United States) David Pate
- Runners-up: (United States) Ken Flach (United States) Robert Seguso
- Score: 6–4, 6–2

Details
- Draw: 28
- Seeds: 8

Events
Singles	Doubles
← 1990 ·	Washington Open	· 1992 →

Grant Connell and Glenn Michibata were the defending champions, but lost in the semifinals to tournament runners-up Ken Flach and Robert Seguso.

Scott Davis and David Pate won the title by defeating Ken Flach and Robert Seguso 6–4, 6–2 in the final.

== Seeds ==
The first four seeds received a bye to the second round.

1. (United States) Scott Davis / (United States) David Pate (champions)
2. (Canada) Grant Connell / (Canada) Glenn Michibata (semifinals)
3. (United States) Patrick Galbraith / (United States) Todd Witsken (quarterfinals)
4. (Australia) Broderick Dyke / (Sweden) Peter Lundgren (second round)
5. (United States) Ken Flach / (United States) Robert Seguso (final)
6. (United States) Brian Garrow / (United States) Brad Pearce (first round)
7. (Sweden) Tobias Svantesson / (United States) Sven Salumaa (first round)
8. (United States) Jim Grabb / (United States) Richey Reneberg (quarterfinals)

== Draw ==
=== Key ===
- Q = Qualifier
- WC = Wild card
- LL = Lucky loser
- Alt = Alternate
- SE = Special exempt
- PR = Protected ranking
- ITF = ITF entry
- JE = Junior exempt
- w/o = Walkover
- r = Retired
- d = Defaulted
- SR = Special ranking

=== Finals ===
Semifinals
1	(United States) Scott Davis (United States) David Pate	3	6	6
WC	(United States) Jared Palmer (United States) Jonathan Stark	6	2	3
5	(United States) Ken Flach (United States) Robert Seguso	6	4	7
2	(Canada) Grant Connell (Canada) Glenn Michibata	4	6	6

Final
1	(United States) Scott Davis (United States) David Pate	6	6
5	(United States) Ken Flach (United States) Robert Seguso	4	2

=== Top half ===
First round
(Venezuela) N Pereira (Peru) J Yzaga	3	6	6
WC	(United States) A Agassi (United States) R Leach	6	3	4
Q	(Mexico) L Herrera (France) G Raoux	2	6	6
(South Africa) B Talbot (United States) G Van Emburgh	6	4	2
WC	(United States) B Gilbert (United States) M Washington	6	6
7	(Sweden) T Svantesson (United States) S Salumaa	3	4
Q	(Germany) A Mronz (Germany) M Zoecke	7	6
(Australia) J Morgan (Australia) M Woodforde	6	4
(United States) C Beckman (Australia) D Macpherson	6	6
(United States) D Flach (United States) K Thorne	3	4
WC	(United States) J Palmer (United States) J Stark	7	7
6	(United States) B Garrow (United States) B Pearce	5	6

Second round
1	(United States) S Davis (United States) D Pate	6	7
(Venezuela) N Pereira (Peru) J Yzaga	4	6
Q	(Mexico) L Herrera (France) G Raoux	6	6	6
WC	(United States) B Gilbert (United States) M Washington	7	4	2
4	(Australia) B Dyke (Sweden) P Lundgren	3	4
Q	(Germany) A Mronz (Germany) M Zoecke	6	6
(United States) C Beckman (Australia) D Macpherson	6	3
WC	(United States) J Palmer (United States) J Stark	7	6

Quarterfinals
1	(United States) S Davis (United States) D Pate	6	7
Q	(Mexico) L Herrera (France) G Raoux	3	6
Q	(Germany) A Mronz (Germany) M Zoecke	3	7	1
WC	(United States) J Palmer (United States) J Stark	6	6	6

Semifinals
1	(United States) S Davis (United States) D Pate	3	6	6
WC	(United States) J Palmer (United States) J Stark	6	2	3

=== Bottom half ===
First round
5	(United States) K Flach (United States) R Seguso	6	6
(Argentina) J Frana (United States) G Layendecker	2	4
(United States) J Brown (United States) B Garnett	7	6	6
(United States) J Arias (South Africa) R Deppe	6	7	3
(Israel) G Bloom (Czechoslovakia) P Korda	6	7
(Australia) N Borwick (Australia) S Youl	4	5
8	(United States) J Grabb (United States) R Reneberg	7	6
(United States) S Melville (United States) TJ Middleton	5	3
(Sweden) J Carlsson (Netherlands) J Eltingh	5	6
(Italy) G Pozzi (United States) D Rostagno	7	7
(Argentina) D Orsanic (Brazil) F Roese	2	7	6
(Sweden) H Holm (South Africa) B Haygarth	6	6	1

Second round
5	(United States) K Flach (United States) R Seguso	6	6
(United States) J Brown (United States) B Garnett	4	4
(Israel) G Bloom (Czechoslovakia) P Korda	5	1
3	(United States) P Galbraith (United States) T Witsken	7	6
8	(United States) J Grabb (United States) R Reneberg	6	6
(Italy) G Pozzi (United States) D Rostagno	3	3
(Argentina) D Orsanic (Brazil) F Roese	3	6
2	(Canada) G Connell (Canada) G Michibata	6	7

Quarterfinals
5	(United States) K Flach (United States) R Seguso	7	7
3	(United States) P Galbraith (United States) T Witsken	6	6
8	(United States) J Grabb (United States) R Reneberg	6	4
2	(Canada) G Connell (Canada) G Michibata	7	6

Semifinals
5	(United States) K Flach (United States) R Seguso	6	4	7
2	(Canada) G Connell (Canada) G Michibata	4	6	6
