= 1991 Sovran Bank Classic – Singles =

Singles
- 1991 Sovran Bank Classic

Final
- Champion: (United States) Andre Agassi
- Runner-up: (Czechoslovakia) Petr Korda
- Score: 6–3, 6–4

Details
- Draw: 56 (5WC/7Q)
- Seeds: 16

Events
Singles	Doubles
- Washington Open

Andre Agassi was the defending champion and successfully defended his title, by defeating Petr Korda 6–3, 6–4 in the final.

== Seeds ==
The first eight seeds received a bye to the second round.

1. (United States) Andre Agassi (champion)
2. (United States) John McEnroe (third round)
3. (United States) Brad Gilbert (quarterfinals)
4. (United States) Richey Reneberg (quarterfinals)
5. (United States) Derrick Rostagno (third round)
6. (Peru) Jaime Yzaga (semifinals)
7. (United States) Aaron Krickstein (second round)
8. (United States) Todd Witsken (second round)
9. (Sweden) Peter Lundgren (second round)
10. (United States) Jimmy Arias (third round)
11. (United States) MaliVai Washington (third round)
12. (Czechoslovakia) Petr Korda (final)
13. (Canada) Grant Connell (third round)
14. (United States) Scott Davis (second round)
15. (Germany) Patrick Baur (second round)
16. (Netherlands) Jacco Eltingh (first round)

== Draw ==
Key

- Q = Qualifier
- WC = Wild card
- LL = Lucky loser
- Alt = Alternate
- ITF = ITF entry
- PR = Protected ranking
- SR = Special ranking
- SE = Special exempt
- JE = Junior exempt
- JR = Junior Accelerator Programme entrant
- CO = College Accelerator Programme entrant
- NG = Next Gen Accelerator Program entrant
- w/o = Walkover
- r = Retired
- d = Defaulted

=== Finals ===
Quarterfinals
1	(United States) Andre Agassi	7	6
Q	(Sweden) Johan Carlsson	5	2
4	(United States) Richey Reneberg	3	4
6	(Peru) Jaime Yzaga	6	6
12	(Czechoslovakia) Petr Korda	7^{7}	7^{7}
3	(United States) Brad Gilbert	6^{5}	6^{4}
(Germany) Markus Zoecke	4	6	6
(Mexico) Luis Herrera	6	3	3

Semifinals
1	(United States) Andre Agassi	6	6
6	(Peru) Jaime Yzaga	3	2
12	(Czechoslovakia) Petr Korda	6	6
(Germany) Markus Zoecke	2	4

Final
1	(United States) Andre Agassi	6	6
12	(Czechoslovakia) Petr Korda	3	4

=== Top half ===
==== Section 1 ====
First round
Q	(United States) K Thorne	3	6	6^{1}
(United States) D Pate	6	4	7^{7}
WC	(United States) J Ross	7	3	6^{2}
(United States) C Adams	5	6	7^{7}
(France) G Raoux	4	6^{3}
15	(Germany) P Baur	6	7^{7}
9	(Sweden) P Lundgren	6	6
(Australia) J Morgan	4	2
Q	(Sweden) J Carlsson	6^{5}	6	6
(United States) C Garner	7^{7}	2	4
(Japan) S Matsuoka	6	6
(United States) J Tarango	4	2

Second round
1	(United States) A Agassi	6	6
(United States) D Pate	4	3
(United States) C Adams	6	6
15	(Germany) P Baur	4	4
9	(Sweden) P Lundgren	6	2	4
Q	(Sweden) J Carlsson	1	6	6
(Japan) S Matsuoka	6	6
8	(United States) T Witsken	3	1

Third round
1	(United States) A Agassi	6	6
(United States) C Adams	2	2
Q	(Sweden) J Carlsson	7^{7}	7^{7}
(Japan) S Matsuoka	6^{2}	6^{1}

Quarterfinals
1	(United States) A Agassi	7	6
Q	(Sweden) J Carlsson	5	2

==== Section 2 ====
First round
(United States) T Ho	6	3	6^{3}
(United States) G Layendecker	2	6	7^{7}
Q	(South Africa) G Stafford	6	4	6
(Canada) M Laurendeau	3	6	2
(Argentina) D Orsanic	4	6^{6}
14	(United States) S Davis	6	7^{8}
11	(United States) MV Washington	6	6^{2}	6
(Argentina) J Frana	3	7^{7}	1
(Brazil) F Roese	6^{4}	1
(Canada) C Pridham	7^{7}	6
Q	(The Bahamas) M Knowles	6	6
(United States) B Pearce	4	0

Second round
4	(United States) R Reneberg	5	6	6
(United States) G Layendecker	7	3	4
Q	(South Africa) G Stafford	5	7	6
14	(United States) S Davis	7	5	0
11	(United States) MV Washington	6	6
(Canada) C Pridham	3	3
Q	(The Bahamas) M Knowles	5	1
6	(Peru) J Yzaga	7	6

Third round
4	(United States) R Reneberg	7^{9}	6
Q	(South Africa) G Stafford	6^{7}	0
11	(United States) MV Washington	4	4
6	(Peru) J Yzaga	6	6

Quarterfinals
4	(United States) R Reneberg	3	4
6	(Peru) J Yzaga	6	6

=== Bottom half ===
==== Section 3 ====
First round
(United States) D Goldie	6^{5}	4
(Australia) S Youl	7^{7}	6
Q	(United States) B Garnett	4	6	6
Q	(United States) R Seguso	6	4	2
WC	(Venezuela) N Pereira	6	3	2
12	(Czechoslovakia) P Korda	4	6	6
13	(Canada) G Connell	6^{3}	6	6
(Canada) M Wostenholme	7^{7}	4	4
(Canada) A Sznajder	5	7	7
(Sweden) H Holm	7	5	5
Q	(United States) J Sullivan	6	6
(United States) J Brown	3	2

Second round
5/WC	(United States) D Rostagno	6	4	6
(Australia) S Youl	3	6	4
Q	(United States) B Garnett	6^{4}	6^{4}
12	(Czechoslovakia) P Korda	7^{7}	7^{7}
13	(Canada) G Connell	6	7
(Canada) A Sznajder	3	5
Q	(United States) J Sullivan	6	2	2
3	(United States) B Gilbert	4	6	6

Third round
5/WC	(United States) D Rostagno	1	3
12	(Czechoslovakia) P Korda	6	6
13	(Canada) G Connell	3	2
3	(United States) B Gilbert	6	6

Quarterfinals
12	(Czechoslovakia) P Korda	7^{7}	7^{7}
3	(United States) B Gilbert	6^{5}	6^{4}

==== Section 4 ====
First round
(Australia) N Borwick	6^{4}	4
(Germany) M Zoecke	7^{7}	6
(Germany) A Mronz	6	7
(Czechoslovakia) S Doseděl	3	5
(Australia) M Woodforde	4	7	4
10	(United States) J Arias	6	5	6
16	(Netherlands) J Eltingh	5	6^{2}
(Mexico) L Herrera	7	7^{7}
WC	(United States) I Baron	3	3
(United States) J Grabb	6	6
WC	(United States) J Palmer	3	3
(United States) B Garrow	6	6

Second round
7	(United States) A Krickstein	6^{3}	6	6^{7}
(Germany) M Zoecke	7^{7}	2	7^{9}
(Germany) A Mronz	4	5
10	(United States) J Arias	6	7
(Mexico) L Herrera	6	3	6
(United States) J Grabb	4	6	3
(United States) B Garrow	3	5
2	(United States) J McEnroe	6	7

Third round
(Germany) M Zoecke	6	6
10	(United States) J Arias	3	4
(Mexico) L Herrera	3	6	6
2	(United States) J McEnroe	6	2	2

Quarterfinals
(Germany) M Zoecke	4	6	6
(Mexico) L Herrera	6	3	3
