= 1990 Sovran Bank Classic – Doubles =

Doubles
- 1990 Sovran Bank Classic

Final
- Champions: (Canada) Grant Connell (Canada) Glenn Michibata
- Runners-up: (Mexico) Jorge Lozano (United States) Todd Witsken
- Score: 6–3, 6–7, 6–2

Details
- Draw: 28
- Seeds: 8

Events
Singles	Doubles
← 1989 ·	Washington Open	· 1991 →

Neil Broad and Gary Muller were the defending champions, but lost in the second round to Kent Kinnear and Brad Pearce.

Grant Connell and Glenn Michibata won the title by defeating Jorge Lozano and Todd Witsken 6–3, 6–7, 6–2 in the final.

== Seeds ==
The first four seeds received a bye to the second round.

1. (Mexico) Jorge Lozano / (United States) Todd Witsken (final)
2. (Canada) Grant Connell / (Canada) Glenn Michibata (champions)
3. (United States) Scott Davis / (United States) David Pate (quarterfinals)
4. (Switzerland) Jakob Hlasek / (West Germany) Michael Stich (quarterfinals)
5. (United Kingdom) Neil Broad / (South Africa) Gary Muller (second round)
6. (United States) Ken Flach / (United States) Robert Seguso (semifinals)
7. (United States) Jim Grabb / (United States) Richey Reneberg (quarterfinals)
8. (Australia) Darren Cahill / (Australia) Andrew Kratzmann (quarterfinals)

== Draw ==
=== Key ===
- Q = Qualifier
- WC = Wild card
- LL = Lucky loser
- Alt = Alternate
- SE = Special exempt
- PR = Protected ranking
- ITF = ITF entry
- JE = Junior exempt
- w/o = Walkover
- r = Retired
- d = Defaulted
- SR = Special ranking

=== Finals ===
Semifinals
1	(Mexico) Jorge Lozano (United States) Todd Witsken	6	6
(United States) Kent Kinnear (United States) Brad Pearce	2	2
6	(United States) Ken Flach (United States) Robert Seguso	3	6	4
2	(Canada) Grant Connell (Canada) Glenn Michibata	6	3	6

Final
1	(Mexico) Jorge Lozano (United States) Todd Witsken	3	7	2
2	(Canada) Grant Connell (Canada) Glenn Michibata	6	6	6

=== Top half ===
First round
(Australia) J Stoltenberg (Australia) S Youl	6	7
(New Zealand) K Evernden (Venezuela) N Pereira	4	6
(Australia) P Doohan (Australia) L Warder	7	4	5
(Czechoslovakia) M Šrejber (Soviet Union) A Volkov	6	6	7
(United States) S Cannon (United States) K Jones	3	4
8	(Australia) D Cahill (Australia) A Kratzmann	6	6
WC	(Australia) B Dyke (South Africa) S Kruger	6	6	6
WC	(United States) C Delaney (United States) Scott Kidd	7	2	0
(United States) K Kinnear (United States) B Pearce	6	6
(United States) J Canter (New Zealand) B Derlin	4	2
(United States) B Garnett (United States) S Salumaa	5	6
5	(United Kingdom) N Broad (South Africa) G Muller	7	7

Second round
1	(Mexico) J Lozano (United States) T Witsken	6	5	7
(Australia) J Stoltenberg (Australia) S Youl	4	7	5
(Czechoslovakia) M Šrejber (Soviet Union) A Volkov	3	6	1
8	(Australia) D Cahill (Australia) A Kratzmann	6	3	6
3	(United States) S Davis (United States) D Pate	4	6	6
WC	(Australia) B Dyke (South Africa) S Kruger	6	3	2
(United States) K Kinnear (United States) B Pearce	6	6	6
5	(United Kingdom) N Broad (South Africa) G Muller	1	7	4

Quarterfinals
1	(Mexico) J Lozano (United States) T Witsken	4	7	6
8	(Australia) D Cahill (Australia) A Kratzmann	6	6	4
3	(United States) S Davis (United States) D Pate	7	4	4
(United States) K Kinnear (United States) B Pearce	5	6	6

Semifinals
1	(Mexico) J Lozano (United States) T Witsken	6	6
(United States) K Kinnear (United States) B Pearce	2	2

=== Bottom half ===
First round
6	(United States) K Flach (United States) R Seguso	6	6
Q	(South Africa) M Barnard (United States) T Mercer	4	3
(United States) B Page (United States) B Shelton	1	4
(Sweden) V Jansson (United States) J Sobel	6	6
(United States) S DeVries (Australia) D Macpherson	6	6
(South Africa) R Deppe (South Africa) B Talbot	2	4
7	(United States) J Grabb (United States) R Reneberg	6	6
(United States) M Chang (United States) C Chang	4	2
Q	(South Africa) W Ferreira (South Africa) P Norval	4	7	3
(United States) T Nelson (Italy) G Pozzi	6	5	6
(United States) P Annacone (South Africa) C van Rensburg	6	6	4
(West Germany) A Hombrecher (United States) M Washington	7	3	6

Second round
6	(United States) K Flach (United States) R Seguso	6	2	6
(Sweden) V Jansson (United States) J Sobel	3	6	4
(United States) S DeVries (Australia) D Macpherson	3	5
4	(Switzerland) J Hlasek (West Germany) M Stich	6	7
7	(United States) J Grabb (United States) R Reneberg	6	6
(United States) T Nelson (Italy) G Pozzi	3	3
(West Germany) A Hombrecher (United States) M Washington	6	7	3
2	(Canada) G Connell (Canada) G Michibata	7	6	6

Quarterfinals
6	(United States) K Flach (United States) R Seguso	2	6	6
4	(Switzerland) J Hlasek (West Germany) M Stich	6	4	2
7	(United States) J Grabb (United States) R Reneberg	3	4
2	(Canada) G Connell (Canada) G Michibata	6	6

Semifinals
6	(United States) K Flach (United States) R Seguso	3	6	4
2	(Canada) G Connell (Canada) G Michibata	6	3	6
