= 1988 Player's Canadian Open – Men's singles =

Men's singles
- 1988 Player's Canadian Open

Final
- Champion: (Czechoslovakia) Ivan Lendl
- Runner-up: (United States) Kevin Curren
- Score: 7–6^{(12–10)}, 6–2

Details
- Draw: 56
- Seeds: 16

Events
Singles	men	women
Doubles	men	women
← 1987 ·	Canadian Open	· 1989 →

Ivan Lendl was the defending champion.

Lendl successfully defended his title, defeating Kevin Curren 7–6^{(12–10)}, 6–2 in the final.

== Seeds ==
1. (Czechoslovakia) Ivan Lendl (champion)
2. (Sweden) Stefan Edberg (second round)
3. (West Germany) ~~Boris Becker~~ (withdrew)
4. (United States) Jimmy Connors (semifinals)
5. (Australia) Pat Cash (quarterfinals)
6. (United States) Tim Mayotte (quarterfinals)
7. (Ecuador) Andrés Gómez (third round)
8. (United States) John McEnroe (quarterfinals)
9. (Sweden) Anders Järryd (second round)
10. (Israel) Amos Mansdorf (first round)
11. (Socialist Federal Republic of Yugoslavia) Slobodan Živojinović (first round)
12. (Australia) John Fitzgerald (second round)
13. (Switzerland) Jakob Hlasek (third round)
14. (United States) Kevin Curren (final)
15. (Sweden) Peter Lundgren (third round)
16. (United States) Jay Berger (third round)

== Draw ==
=== Key ===
- Q = Qualifier
- WC = Wild card
- LL = Lucky loser
- Alt = Alternate
- SE = Special exempt
- PR = Protected ranking
- ITF = ITF entry
- JE = Junior exempt
- w/o = Walkover
- r = Retired
- d = Defaulted
- SR = Special ranking

=== Finals ===
Semifinals
1	(Czechoslovakia) Ivan Lendl	6	6
4	(United States) Jimmy Connors	4	4
14	(United States) Kevin Curren	6	6
(Australia) Mark Woodforde	4	2

Final
1	(Czechoslovakia) Ivan Lendl	7^{12}	6
14	(United States) Kevin Curren	6^{10}	2

=== Top half ===
==== Section 1 ====
First round
(United States) T Witsken	1	6	7
(India) R Krishnan	6	3	5
(United States) M Davis	6	3	6
WC	(Canada) M Wostenholme	2	6	3
(United States) S Davis	0	3
16	(United States) J Berger	6	6
10	(Israel) A Mansdorf	4	1
(Australia) J Frawley	6	6
WC	(Canada) A Sznajder	6	7
(United Kingdom) A Castle	4	5
(United States) J Brown	6	6	2
(France) J-P Fleurian	7	1	6

Second round
1	(Czechoslovakia) I Lendl	6	6
(United States) T Witsken	2	2
(United States) M Davis	4	6	3
16	(United States) J Berger	6	2	6
(Australia) J Frawley	6	6
WC	(Canada) A Sznajder	2	2
(France) J-P Fleurian	2	6	4
7	(Ecuador) A Gómez	6	1	6

Third round
1	(Czechoslovakia) I Lendl	6	6
16	(United States) J Berger	3	0
(Australia) J Frawley	6	1	7
7	(Ecuador) A Gómez	4	6	5

Quarterfinals
1	(Czechoslovakia) I Lendl	6	6
(Australia) J Frawley	2	2

==== Section 2 ====
First round
Q	(United States) D Flach	4	6	6
Q	(Mexico) F Maciel	6	1	2
(United States) L Shiras	6	6
(United States) M Dickson	3	4
(United States) J Pugh	6	1	5
13	(Switzerland) J Hlasek	3	6	7
11	(Socialist Federal Republic of Yugoslavia) S Živojinović	2	6
(United States) S Giammalva Jr.	6	7
Q	(Australia) S Youl	6	7
LL	(United States) J Ross	3	5
(Senegal) Y Doumbia	7	6
(Canada) M Laurendeau	5	3

Second round
4	(United States) J Connors	6	6
Q	(United States) D Flach	1	3
(United States) L Shiras	2	6
13	(Switzerland) J Hlasek	6	7
(United States) S Giammalva Jr.	6	6
Q	(Australia) S Youl	2	3
(Senegal) Y Doumbia	6	3	6
5	(Australia) P Cash	3	6	7

Third round
4	(United States) J Connors	6	6
13	(Switzerland) J Hlasek	1	4
(United States) S Giammalva Jr.	2	2
5	(Australia) P Cash	6	6

Quarterfinals
4	(United States) J Connors	7	7
5	(Australia) P Cash	6	6

==== Section 3 ====
First round
Q	(Australia) C Limberger	4	3
(Australia) W Masur	6	6
(United States) T Wilkison	6	6
(United States) G Holmes	1	1
(Canada) G Connell	6	2	6
12	(Australia) J Fitzgerald	2	6	7
14	(United States) K Curren	6	5	6
(United States) M Anger	4	7	3
(Mexico) J Lozano	5	3
(Canada) G Michibata	7	6
(United States) J Rive	6	6	6
(United States) R Matuszewski	3	7	3

Second round
6	(United States) T Mayotte	6	7
(Australia) W Masur	3	6
(United States) T Wilkison	6	1
12	(Australia) J Fitzgerald	4	4^{r}
14	(United States) K Curren	6	6
(Canada) G Michibata	2	4
(United States) J Rive	4	4
LL	(United States) D Cassidy	6	6

Third round
6	(United States) T Mayotte	7	5	7
(United States) T Wilkison	6	7	6
14	(United States) K Curren	6	6
LL	(United States) D Cassidy	1	2

Quarterfinals
6	(United States) T Mayotte	6	4	5
14	(United States) K Curren	3	6	7

==== Section 4 ====
First round
(United States) T Nelson	2	2
(New Zealand) K Evernden	6	6
(United States) D Rostagno	7	6
(United States) R Reneberg	5	2
(United States) R Seguso	5	2
9	(Sweden) A Järryd	7	6
15	(Sweden) P Lundgren	6	6
Q	(United States) C Garner	3	2
Q	(Australia) P Carter	6	7
Q	(United States) C Beckman	2	6
(Australia) M Woodforde	7	3	7
(United States) K Flach	6	6	5

Second round
8	(United States) J McEnroe	6	7
(New Zealand) K Evernden	3	5
(United States) D Rostagno	6	7
9	(Sweden) A Järryd	3	5
15	(Sweden) P Lundgren	6	6
Q	(Australia) P Carter	2	0
(Australia) M Woodforde	6	7	6
2	(Sweden) S Edberg	7	5	2

Third round
8	(United States) J McEnroe	6	6
(United States) D Rostagno	3	2
15	(Sweden) P Lundgren	3	0
(Australia) M Woodforde	6	6

Quarterfinals
8	(United States) J McEnroe	2	6	2
(Australia) M Woodforde	6	2	6
