= 1990 Sovran Bank Classic – Singles =

Singles
- 1990 Sovran Bank Classic

Final
- Champion: (United States) Andre Agassi
- Runner-up: (United States) Jim Grabb
- Score: 6–1, 6–4

Details
- Draw: 56 (4WC/7Q)
- Seeds: 16

Events
Singles	Doubles
- Washington Open

Tim Mayotte was the defending champion, but lost in the third round to Todd Witsken.

Andre Agassi won the title by defeating Jim Grabb 6–1, 6–4 in the final.

== Seeds ==
The first eight seeds received a bye to the second round.

1. (United States) Andre Agassi (champion)
2. (United States) Brad Gilbert (semifinals)
3. (United States) John McEnroe (third round)
4. (United States) Tim Mayotte (third round)
5. (United States) Michael Chang (semifinals)
6. (United States) Jim Grabb (final)
7. (United States) Richey Reneberg (quarterfinals)
8. (Soviet Union) Alexander Volkov (second round)
9. (South Africa) Christo van Rensburg (first round)
10. (Switzerland) Jakob Hlasek (third round)
11. (Australia) Andrew Kratzmann (first round)
12. (Czechoslovakia) Milan Šrejber (first round)
13. (South Africa) Gary Muller (second round)
14. (United States) Todd Witsken (quarterfinals)
15. (Israel) Gilad Bloom (third round)
16. (Canada) Andrew Sznajder (third round)

== Draw ==
Key

- Q = Qualifier
- WC = Wild card
- LL = Lucky loser
- Alt = Alternate
- ITF = ITF entry
- PR = Protected ranking
- SR = Special ranking
- SE = Special exempt
- JE = Junior exempt
- JR = Junior Accelerator Programme entrant
- CO = College Accelerator Programme entrant
- NG = Next Gen Accelerator Program entrant
- w/o = Walkover
- r = Retired
- d = Defaulted

=== Finals ===
Quarterfinals
1	(United States) Andre Agassi	7^{7}	6
7	(United States) Richey Reneberg	6^{4}	0
14	(United States) Todd Witsken	3	4
5	(United States) Michael Chang	6	6
6	(United States) Jim Grabb	6	6
(United States) Derrick Rostagno	4	3
(West Germany) Michael Stich	3	4
2	(United States) Brad Gilbert	6	6

Semifinals
1	(United States) Andre Agassi	6	6
5	(United States) Michael Chang	3	1
6	(United States) Jim Grabb	7	0	6
2	(United States) Brad Gilbert	5	6	4

Final
1	(United States) Andre Agassi	6	6
6	(United States) Jim Grabb	1	4

=== Top half ===
==== Section 1 ====
First round
(United States) B Shelton	4	6	2
(United States) B Pearce	6	3	6
WC	(United States) J Palmer	6	6	6
(Sweden) T Högstedt	7	4	4
Q	(Mexico) L Herrera	4	3
15	(Israel) G Bloom	6	6
9	(South Africa) C van Rensburg	4	0
(Australia) D Cahill	6	6
(Canada) M Laurendeau	4	3
(Puerto Rico) M Nido	6	6
(South Africa) M Kaplan	7	3	0
(Australia) J Stoltelberg	5	6	6

Second round
1	(United States) A Agassi	7	6
(United States) B Pearce	6	3
WC	(United States) J Palmer	2	4
15	(Israel) G Bloom	6	6
(Australia) D Cahill	4	6	6
(Puerto Rico) M Nido	6	0	2
(Australia) J Stoltelberg	6	2	3
7	(United States) R Reneberg	3	6	6

Third round
1	(United States) A Agassi	6	7
15	(Israel) G Bloom	1	5
(Australia) D Cahill	4	6	5
7	(United States) R Reneberg	6	2	7

Quarterfinals
1	(United States) A Agassi	7^{7}	6
7	(United States) R Reneberg	6^{4}	0

==== Section 2 ====
First round
(India) R Krishnan	6	6
(New Zealand) K Evernden	3	1
(United States) D Goldie	6	6
(West Germany) P Kühnen	2	2
(United States) M Washington	5	2
14	(United States) T Witsken	7	6
11	(Australia) M Kratzmann	3	4
(Australia) S Youl	6	6
(Sweden) P Lundgren	0	2
(United States) R Weiss	6	6
WC	(United States) S Bryan	6	6
(United States) K Jones	3	3

Second round
4	(United States) T Mayotte	6	6
(India) R Krishnan	2	1
(United States) D Goldie	3	4
14	(United States) T Witsken	6	6
(Australia) S Youl	6	3	7
(United States) R Weiss	3	6	6
WC	(United States) S Bryan	2	6
5	(United States) M Chang	6	7

Third round
4	(United States) T Mayotte	6	4	5
14	(United States) T Witsken	2	6	7
(Australia) S Youl	1	1
5	(United States) M Chang	6	6

Quarterfinals
14	(United States) T Witsken	3	4
5	(United States) M Chang	6	6

=== Bottom half ===
==== Section 3 ====
First round
(Australia) M Woodforde	6	6	6
(United States) P Annacone	7	3	2
(United States) J Rive	6	4
Q	(United States) J Brown	7	6
(Canada) G Connell	6	7
12	(Czechoslovakia) M Šrejber	3	6
13	(South Africa) G Muller	6	6
Q	(Australia) S Stolle	3	3
(Canada) M Wostenholme	3	7	1
(United States) D Rostagno	6	6	6
(United States) D Pate	4	4
(United States) P Chamberlin	6	6

Second round
6	(United States) J Grabb	6	6
(Australia) M Woodforde	2	2
Q	(United States) J Brown	3	6
(Canada) G Connell	6	7
13	(South Africa) G Muller	6	3	2
(United States) D Rostagno	4	6	6
(United States) P Chamberlin	2	3
3/WC	(United States) J McEnroe	6	6

Third round
6	(United States) J Grabb	6	6
(Canada) G Connell	4	4
(United States) D Rostagno	6	1	6
3/WC	(United States) J McEnroe	3	6	1

Quarterfinals
6	(United States) J Grabb	6	6
(United States) D Rostagno	4	3

==== Section 4 ====
First round
Q	(South Africa) G Stafford	6	0
(West Germany) M Stich	7	6
(Venezuela) N Pereira	7	6
WC	(United States) J Ross	6	2
(West Germany) A Mronz	4	5
10	(Switzerland) J Hlasek	6	7
16	(Canada) A Sznajder	6	5	6
Q	(United States) K Flach	4	7	4
Q	(South Africa) M Ondruska	4	6	6
Q	(West Germany) P Baur	6	1	0
(United States) J Tarango	4	6	3
WC	(United States) E Teltscher	6	4	6

Second round
8	(Soviet Union) A Volkov	4	5
(West Germany) M Stich	6	7
(Venezuela) N Pereira	6	3
10	(Switzerland) J Hlasek	7	6
16	(Canada) A Sznajder	6	6
Q	(South Africa) M Ondruska	3	0
WC	(United States) E Teltscher	1	5
2	(United States) B Gilbert	6	7

Third round
(West Germany) M Stich	7	7
10	(Switzerland) J Hlasek	6	6
16	(Canada) A Sznajder	2	3
2	(United States) B Gilbert	6	6

Quarterfinals
(West Germany) M Stich	3	4
2	(United States) B Gilbert	6	6
