= Carrie-Lynn Cohen =

Canadian tennis player

- Country (sports): Canada
- Born: March 7, 1967 (age 58)

Singles
- Highest ranking: No. 353 (Aug 29, 1988)

Doubles
- Highest ranking: No. 300 (Jun 20, 1988)

Carrie-Lynn Cohen (born March 7, 1967) is a Canadian former professional tennis player.

== Tennis career ==
Cohen played collegiate tennis for Oklahoma State University and won a Big Eight conference title in 1986 at No. 4 singles.

On the professional tour she reached a best singles world ranking of 353 and made her only WTA Tour main draw appearance came as a qualifier at the 1988 Canadian Open.

At the 1984 Maccabiah Pan American Games in Sao Paulo, Brazil, she won a gold medal in women's singles and a bronze medal in women's doubles.

Cohen competed in the 1985 Maccabiah Games and the 1989 Maccabiah Games in Israel, representing Canada.
