= 1989 Player's Canadian Open =

- Date: August 14–20 (men); August 21–27 (women)
- Edition: 100th
- Surface: Hard / outdoor
- Location: Montreal, Quebec, Canada (men); Toronto, Ontario, Canada (women)

Champions

Men's singles
- (Czechoslovakia) Ivan Lendl

Women's singles
- (United States) Martina Navratilova

Men's doubles
- (New Zealand) Kelly Evernden / (United States) Todd Witsken

Women's doubles
- (United States) Gigi Fernández / (United States) Robin White
- Canadian Open

The 1989 Player's International Canadian Open was a tennis tournament played on outdoor hard courts. The men's tournament was held at the du Maurier Stadium in Montreal in Canada and was part of the 1989 Nabisco Grand Prix while the women's tournament was held at the National Tennis Centre in Toronto in Canada and was part of the Category 5 tier of the 1989 WTA Tour. The men's tournament was held from August 14 through August 20, 1989, while the women's tournament was held from August 21 through August 27, 1989.

== Finals ==
=== Men's singles ===
(Czechoslovakia) Ivan Lendl defeated (United States) John McEnroe 6–1, 6–3

- It was Lendl's 7th title of the year and the 86th of his career.

=== Women's singles ===
(United States) Martina Navratilova defeated (Spain) Arantxa Sánchez Vicario 6–2, 6–2

- It was Navratilova's 11th title of the year and the 274th of her career.

=== Men's doubles ===
(New Zealand) Kelly Evernden / (United States) Todd Witsken defeated (United States) Charles Beckman / (United States) Shelby Cannon 6–3, 6–3

- It was Evernden's 2nd title of the year and the 7th of his career. It was Witsken's 3rd title of the year and the 7th of his career.

=== Women's doubles ===
(United States) Gigi Fernández / (United States) Robin White defeated (United States) Martina Navratilova / (Soviet Union) Larisa Savchenko 6–1, 7–5

- It was Fernández's 2nd title of the year and the 11th of her career. It was White's 1st title of the year and the 9th of her career.

== See also ==
- Lendl–McEnroe rivalry
