= 1988 Player's Canadian Open =

- Date: August 8–14 (men); August 15–21 (women)
- Edition: 99th
- Surface: Hard / outdoor
- Location: Toronto, Ontario, Canada (men); Montreal, Quebec, Canada (women)

Champions

Men's singles
- (Czechoslovakia) Ivan Lendl

Women's singles
- (Argentina) Gabriela Sabatini

Men's doubles
- (United States) Ken Flach / (United States) Robert Seguso

Women's doubles
- (Czechoslovakia) Jana Novotná / (Czechoslovakia) Helena Suková
- Canadian Open

The 1988 Player's International Canadian Open was a tennis tournament played on outdoor hard courts. The men's tournament was held at the National Tennis Centre in Toronto in Canada and was part of the 1988 Nabisco Grand Prix while the women's tournament was held at the du Maurier Stadium in Montreal in Canada and was part of Tier II of the 1988 WTA Tour. The men's tournament was held from August 8 through August 14, 1988, while the women's tournament was held from August 15 through August 21, 1988.

== Finals ==
=== Men's singles ===
(Czechoslovakia) Ivan Lendl defeated (United States) Kevin Curren 7–6^{(12–10)}, 6–2

- It was Lendl's 3rd title of the year and the 79th of his career.

=== Women's singles ===
(Argentina) Gabriela Sabatini defeated (Soviet Union) Natasha Zvereva 6–1, 6–2

- It was Sabatini's 5th title of the year and the 17th of her career.

=== Men's doubles ===
(United States) Ken Flach / (United States) Robert Seguso defeated (United Kingdom) Andrew Castle / (United States) Tim Wilkison 7–6^{(7–3)}, 6–3

- It was Flach's 3rd title of the year and the 22nd of his career. It was Seguso's 3rd title of the year and the 22nd of his career.

=== Women's doubles ===
(Czechoslovakia) Jana Novotná / (Czechoslovakia) Helena Suková defeated (United States) Zina Garrison / (United States) Pam Shriver 7–6^{(7–2)}, 7–6^{(8–6)}

- It was Novotná's 5th title of the year and the 9th of her career. It was Suková's 3rd title of the year and the 31st of her career.
