= 1993 Newsweek Tennis Classic – Doubles =

Doubles
- 1993 Newsweek Tennis Classic

Final
- Champions: (Zimbabwe) Byron Black (United States) Rick Leach
- Runners-up: (Canada) Grant Connell (United States) Patrick Galbraith
- Score: 6–4, 7–5

Details
- Draw: 28 (4WC/2Q)
- Seeds: 8

Events
Singles	Doubles
- Washington Open

Bret Garnett and Jared Palmer were the defending champions, but Palmer chose to rest in order to compete at Montreal the following week. Garnett teamed up with Mike Briggs and lost in the second round to Mark Keil and Christo van Rensburg.

Byron Black and Rick Leach won the title by defeating Grant Connell and Patrick Galbraith 6–4, 7–5 in the final.

== Seeds ==
The first four seeds received a bye to the second round.

1. (United States) Patrick McEnroe / (United States) Richey Reneberg (semifinals)
2. (Canada) Grant Connell / (United States) Patrick Galbraith (final)
3. (South Africa) Danie Visser / (Australia) Laurie Warder (quarterfinals)
4. (Zimbabwe) Byron Black / (United States) Rick Leach (champions)
5. (Canada) Glenn Michibata / (United States) David Pate (first round)
6. (South Africa) Stefan Kruger / (United States) Greg Van Emburgh (second round)
7. (United States) Mark Keil / (South Africa) Christo van Rensburg (quarterfinals)
8. (United States) Brad Pearce / (United States) Dave Randall (quarterfinals)

== Draw ==
Key

- Q = Qualifier
- WC = Wild card
- LL = Lucky loser
- Alt = Alternate
- ITF = ITF entry
- PR = Protected ranking
- SR = Special ranking
- SE = Special exempt
- JE = Junior exempt
- JR = Junior Accelerator Programme entrant
- CO = College Accelerator Programme entrant
- NG = Next Gen Accelerator Program entrant
- w/o = Walkover
- r = Retired
- d = Defaulted

=== Finals ===
Semifinals
1	(United States) Patrick McEnroe (United States) Richey Reneberg	2	6	6
4	(Zimbabwe) Byron Black (United States) Rick Leach	6	3	7
(United States) Bryan Shelton (United States) Todd Witsken	3	4
2	(Canada) Grant Connell (United States) Patrick Galbraith	6	6

Final
4	(Zimbabwe) Byron Black (United States) Rick Leach	6	7
2	(Canada) Grant Connell (United States) Patrick Galbraith	4	5

=== Top half ===
First round
(Germany) P Baur (Germany) C Saceanu	3	6	6
(South Africa) R Deppe (The Bahamas) M Knowles	6	4	2
(Austria) A Antonitsch (United Kingdom) J Bates	6	2	3
(United States) M Briggs (United States) B Garnett	4	6	6
Q	(Germany) A Finnberg (Germany) M Zoecke	4	6	3
7	(United States) M Keil (South Africa) C van Rensburg	6	3	6
(United States) S Davis (United States) K Jones	6	6	4
(Australia) A Kratzmann (Australia) M Kratzmann	3	7	6
Q	(United States) T Ho (Italy) G Pozzi	2	1
(Australia) P Rafter (Australia) S Stolle	6	6
(United States) T Mercer (United States) J Sullivan	6	7
5	(Canada) G Michibata (United States) D Pate	4	5

Second round
1	(United States) P McEnroe (United States) R Reneberg	6	4	6
(Germany) P Baur (Germany) C Saceanu	2	6	2
(United States) M Briggs (United States) B Garnett	4	3
7	(United States) M Keil (South Africa) C van Rensburg	6	6
4	(Zimbabwe) B Black (United States) R Leach	6	7
(Australia) A Kratzmann (Australia) M Kratzmann	2	6
(Australia) P Rafter (Australia) S Stolle	6	6
(United States) T Mercer (United States) J Sullivan	3	4

Quarterfinals
1	(United States) P McEnroe (United States) R Reneberg	6	6
7	(United States) M Keil (South Africa) C van Rensburg	2	3
4	(Zimbabwe) B Black (United States) R Leach	6	7
(Australia) P Rafter (Australia) S Stolle	4	6

Semifinals
1	(United States) P McEnroe (United States) R Reneberg	2	6	6
4	(Zimbabwe) B Black (United States) R Leach	6	3	7

=== Bottom half ===
First round
6	(South Africa) S Kruger (United States) G Van Emburgh	6	6
(Portugal) J Cunha e Silva (Brazil) L Mattar	3	4
WC	(Mexico) L Herrera (United States) V Spadea	6	1
(United States) B Shelton (United States) T Witsken	7	6
(Australia) N Borwick (United States) K Thorne	2	0^{r}
(Czech Republic) M Damm (Sweden) H Holm	6	2
8	(United States) B Pearce (United States) D Randall	6	6
WC	(Czech Republic) P Korda (United States) I Lendl	3	4
(New Zealand) B Steven (South Africa) B Talbot	4	6	7
(Switzerland) J Hlasek (United States) T Martin	6	4	6
WC	(Israel) A Mansdorf (United States) MV Washington	4	6	3
WC	(United States) B Gilbert (United States) B MacPhie	6	2	6

Second round
6	(South Africa) S Kruger (United States) G Van Emburgh	7	5	6
(United States) B Shelton (United States) T Witsken	6	7	7
(Czech Republic) M Damm (Sweden) H Holm	5	7	3
3	(South Africa) D Visser (Australia) L Warder	7	5	6
8	(United States) B Pearce (United States) D Randall	3	6	7
(New Zealand) B Steven (South Africa) B Talbot	6	1	5
WC	(United States) B Gilbert (United States) B MacPhie	3	4
2	(Canada) G Connell (United States) P Galbraith	6	6

Quarterfinals
(United States) B Shelton (United States) T Witsken	6	7
3	(South Africa) D Visser (Australia) L Warder	4	6
8	(United States) B Pearce (United States) D Randall	6	4
2	(Canada) G Connell (United States) P Galbraith	7	6

Semifinals
(United States) B Shelton (United States) T Witsken	3	4
2	(Canada) G Connell (United States) P Galbraith	6	6
