= 1992 NationsBank Classic =

- Date: July 13–19
- Edition: 24th
- Category: Championship Series
- Draw: 56S / 28D
- Prize money: $490,000
- Surface: Hard / outdoors
- Location: Washington, D.C., U.S.
- Venue: William H.G. FitzGerald Tennis Center

Champions

Singles
- (Czechoslovakia) Petr Korda

Doubles
- (United States) Bret Garnett / (United States) David Pate
- Washington Open

The 1992 NationsBank Classic was a men's tennis tournament played on outdoor hard courts at the William H.G. FitzGerald Tennis Center in Washington, D.C. in the United States that was part of the Championship Series of the 1992 ATP Tour. It was the 24th edition of the tournament was held from July 13 through July 19, 1992. First-seeded Petr Korda won his second consecutive singles title at the event.

== Finals ==
=== Singles ===
(Czechoslovakia) Petr Korda defeated (Sweden) Henrik Holm 6–4, 6–4

- It was Korda's first singles title of the year and the third of his career.

=== Doubles ===
(United States) Bret Garnett / (United States) Jared Palmer defeated (United States) Ken Flach / (United States) Todd Witsken 6–2, 6–3
