= Martin Barba (tennis) =

American tennis player

- Country (sports): United States
- Born: August 22, 1966 (age 59) Laguna Beach, California
- Height: 5 ft 11 in (180 cm)
- Prize money: $15,869

Singles
- Career record: 2–5
- Highest ranking: No. 303 (May 14, 1990)

Grand Slam singles results
- US Open: Q1 (1993)

Doubles
- Highest ranking: No. 798 (Mar 23, 1987)

Martin Barba (born August 22, 1966) is an American former professional tennis player.

A native of California, Barba moved to Florida to live with his brother after their mother died in the late 1970s. He trained at Holiday Park in Fort Lauderdale, which was made famous for producing Chris Evert. Attending Lander College on a full scholarship, he earned NAIA All-American honors in 1985 and turned professional in 1988. He had an upset win over 16th-seed Jimmy Brown in the first round of the 1989 U.S. Pro Tennis Championships in Boston.
