= 1990 Sovran Bank Classic =

- Date: July 16–22
- Edition: 22nd
- Category: Championship Series
- Draw: 56S / 28D
- Prize money: $420,000
- Surface: Hard / outdoors
- Location: Washington, D.C., U.S.
- Venue: William H.G. FitzGerald Tennis Center

Champions

Singles
- (United States) Andre Agassi

Doubles
- (Canada) Grant Connell / (Canada) Glenn Michibata
- Washington Open

The 1990 Sovran Bank Classic was a men's tennis tournament played on outdoor hard courts at the William H.G. FitzGerald Tennis Center in Washington, D.C. in the United States that was part of the Championship Series of the 1990 ATP Tour. It was the 22nd edition of the tournament was held from July 16 through July 22, 1990. First-seeded Andre Agassi won the singles title and earned $70,000 first-prize money.

== Finals ==
=== Singles ===
(United States) Andre Agassi defeated (United States) Jim Grabb 6–1, 6–4

- It was Agassi's third singles title of the year and the 11th of his career.

=== Doubles ===
(Canada) Grant Connell / (Canada) Glenn Michibata defeated (Mexico) Jorge Lozano / (United States) Todd Witsken 2–6, 6–4, 6–2
