= James Schor =

American tennis player (born 1965)

- Full name: James Schor
- Country (sports): United States
- Born: October 14, 1965 (age 59); Miami, Florida, U.S.
- Height: 6 ft 1 in (185 cm)
- Prize money: $21,319

Singles
- Career record: 0–1
- Highest ranking: No. 418 (August 7, 1989)

Doubles
- Career record: 6–12
- Highest ranking: No. 133 (November 27, 1989)

Grand Slam doubles results
- Australian Open: 1R (1990)

James Schor (born October 14, 1965) is a former professional tennis player from the United States.

== Biography ==
Originally from Miami, Schor played collegiate tennis for the University of Maryland between 1984 and 1987. Following his graduation in 1988, he competed for four years on the professional circuit.

Schor qualified for the singles draw at the 1989 Washington Open, but made the rest of his ATP Tour main draw appearances in doubles.

As a doubles player he had a best ranking of 133 in the world and featured in the men's doubles main draw at the 1990 Australian Open with former college teammate Alfonso Mora. He also achieved a world ranking of 418 in singles.

He now works as an executive coach, leadership trainer and corporate culture change consultant. He is also licensed Marriage and Family Therapist.

== Challenger titles ==
=== Doubles: (1) ===
No.	Year	Tournament	Surface	Partner	Opponents	Score
1.	1989	Lagos, Nigeria	Hard	(Venezuela) Alfonso Mora	(Netherlands) Jacco Eltingh (Netherlands) Paul Haarhuis	4–6, 7–6, 6–2
