= 1988 Sovran Bank Classic =

- Date: July 18–24
- Edition: 20th
- Draw: 56S / 28D
- Prize money: $297,500
- Surface: Hard / outdoors
- Location: Washington, D.C., U.S.
- Venue: Rock Creek Park

Champions

Singles
- (United States) Jimmy Connors

Doubles
- (United States) Rick Leach / (United States) Jim Pugh
- Washington Open

The 1988 Sovran Bank Classic was a men's tennis tournament played on outdoor hard courts at the Rock Creek Park in Washington, D.C. in the United States that was part of the 1988 Nabisco Grand Prix. It was the 20th edition of the tournament was held from July 18 through July 24, 1988. First-seeded Jimmy Connors, who entered on a wildcard, won the singles title, his third at the event after 1976 and 1978.

== Finals ==
=== Singles ===
(United States) Jimmy Connors defeated (Ecuador) Andrés Gómez 6–1, 6–4

- It was Connors' first singles title of the year and the 106th of his career.

=== Doubles ===
(United States) Rick Leach / (United States) Jim Pugh defeated (Mexico) Jorge Lozano / (United States) Todd Witsken 6–3, 6–7, 6–2
