= 1993 Waldbaum's Hamlet Cup =

- Date: August 23–29
- Edition: 13th
- Category: World Series
- Draw: 32S / 16D
- Prize money: $275,000
- Surface: Hard / outdoor
- Location: Commack, New York, U.S.

Champions

Singles
- (Switzerland) Marc Rosset

Doubles
- (Germany) Marc-Kevin Goellner / (Germany) David Prinosil
← 1992 ·	Waldbaum's Hamlet Cup	· 1994 →

The 1993 Waldbaum's Hamlet Cup was a men's tennis tournament played on outdoor hard courts. It was the 13th edition of the event known that year as the Waldbaum's Hamlet Cup, and was part of the World Series of the 1993 ATP Tour. It took place at the Hamlet Golf and Country Club in Commack, Long Island, New York, United States, from August 23 through August 29, 1993.

The singles line up featured ATP No. 3, reigning US Open champion, Australian Open runner-up, Madrid winner Stefan Edberg, Wimbledon semifinalist, Doha, Milan titlist Boris Becker, and French Open, Monte Carlo, Gstaad, Prague champion Sergi Bruguera. Other seeds were Hamburg, Stuttgart, Queen's Club, Basel winner Michael Stich, Cincinnati, Jakarta and Osaka titlist Michael Chang, Petr Korda, Goran Ivanišević and Alexander Volkov.

Unseeded Marc Rosset won the singles title.

== Finals ==
=== Singles ===
(Switzerland) Marc Rosset defeated (United States) Michael Chang, 6–4, 3–6, 6–1

- It was Marc Rosset's 2nd title of the year, and his 6th overall.

=== Doubles ===
(Germany) Marc-Kevin Goellner / (Germany) David Prinosil defeated (France) Arnaud Boetsch / (France) Olivier Delaître, 6–7, 7–5, 6–2
