= 1991 Norstar Bank Hamlet Challenge Cup – Doubles =

Doubles
- 1991 Norstar Bank Hamlet Challenge Cup

Final
- Champions: (Germany) Eric Jelen (Germany) Carl-Uwe Steeb
- Runners-up: (United States) Doug Flach (Italy) Diego Nargiso
- Score: 0–6, 6–4, 7–6

Events
Singles	Doubles
← 1990 ·	Norstar Bank Hamlet Challenge Cup	· 1992 →

Guy Forget and Jakob Hlasek were the defending champions, but lost in the quarterfinals to Eric Jelen and Carl-Uwe Steeb.

Eric Jelen and Carl-Uwe Steeb won in the final 0–6, 6–4, 7–6, against Doug Flach and Diego Nargiso.

== Seeds ==
1. (France) Guy Forget / (Switzerland) Jakob Hlasek (quarterfinals)
2. (United States) Jimmy Brown / (United States) Scott Melville (first round)
3. (United Kingdom) Nick Brown / (Belgium) Libor Pimek (first round)
4. (United States) Bret Garnett / (Mexico) Jorge Lozano (semifinals)

== Draw ==
=== Key ===
- Q = Qualifier
- WC = Wild card
- LL = Lucky loser
- Alt = Alternate
- SE = Special exempt
- PR = Protected ranking
- ITF = ITF entry
- JE = Junior exempt
- w/o = Walkover
- r = Retired
- d = Defaulted
- SR = Special ranking

=== Draw ===
First round
1	(France) G Forget (Switzerland) J Hlasek	6	6	6
(Sweden) R Bergh (Sweden) J Svensson	3	7	3
WC	(Germany) E Jelen (Germany) C-U Steeb	7	6
(South Africa) J-L de Jager (South Africa) C van Rensburg	6	4
3	(United Kingdom) N Brown (Belgium) L Pimek	1	4
Q	(France) A Boetsch (France) J-P Fleurian	6	6
(Israel) G Bloom (Venezuela) A Gonzalez-Mora	2	6
(South Africa) B Haygarth (South Africa) B Talbot	6	7
(Brazil) L Mattar (Brazil) J Oncins	6	7
(Sweden) O Jonsson (United States) G van Emburgh	3	6
(Switzerland) M Rosset (Netherlands) J Siemerink	3	6
4	(United States) B Garnett (Mexico) J Lozano	6	7
(South Africa) R Deppe (United States) S Patridge	3	4
(United States) D Flach (Italy) D Nargiso	6	6
(Sweden) P Lundgren (United States) R Reneberg	6	6
2	(United States) J Brown (United States) S Melville	4	2

Quarterfinals
1	(France) G Forget (Switzerland) J Hlasek	4	2
WC	(Germany) E Jelen (Germany) C-U Steeb	6	6
Q	(France) A Boetsch (France) J-P Fleurian	3	4
(South Africa) B Haygarth (South Africa) B Talbot	6	6
(Brazil) L Mattar (Brazil) J Oncins	3	4
4	(United States) B Garnett (Mexico) J Lozano	6	6
(United States) D Flach (Italy) D Nargiso	4	7	6
(Sweden) P Lundgren (United States) R Reneberg	6	6	4

Semifinals
WC	(Germany) E Jelen (Germany) C-U Steeb	6	6
(South Africa) B Haygarth (South Africa) B Talbot	3	3
4	(United States) B Garnett (Mexico) J Lozano	5	2
(United States) D Flach (Italy) D Nargiso	7	6

Final
WC	(Germany) E Jelen (Germany) C-U Steeb	0	6	7
2	(United States) D Flach (Italy) D Nargiso	6	4	6
