= 1992 Waldbaum's Hamlet Cup – Doubles =

Doubles
- 1992 Waldbaum's Hamlet Cup

Final
- Champions: (United States) Francisco Montana (United States) Greg Van Emburgh
- Runners-up: (Italy) Gianluca Pozzi (Finland) Olli Rahnasto
- Score: 6–4, 6–2

Events
Singles	Doubles
← 1991 ·	Waldbaum's Hamlet Cup	· 1993 →

Eric Jelen and Carl-Uwe Steeb were the defending champions, but Jelen chose not to participate, and only Steeb competed that year.
Steeb partnered with Markus Zoecke, but lost in the first round to Murphy Jensen and Gabriel Markus.

Francisco Montana and Greg Van Emburgh won in the final 6–4, 6–2, against Gianluca Pozzi and Olli Rahnasto.

== Seeds ==
1. (United States) Francisco Montana / (United States) Greg Van Emburgh (champions)
2. (Czechoslovakia) Martin Damm / (Czechoslovakia) Cyril Suk (semifinals)
3. (United States) Charles Beckman / (Australia) Broderick Dyke (first round)
4. (Brazil) Jaime Oncins / (Netherlands) Jan Siemerink (semifinals)

== Draw ==
=== Key ===
- Q = Qualifier
- WC = Wild card
- LL = Lucky loser
- Alt = Alternate
- SE = Special exempt
- PR = Protected ranking
- ITF = ITF entry
- JE = Junior exempt
- w/o = Walkover
- r = Retired
- d = Defaulted
- SR = Special ranking

=== Draw ===
First round
1	(Czechoslovakia) M Damm (Czechoslovakia) C Suk	6	6
(Sweden) N Kulti (Sweden) M Larsson	3	4
(France) O Delaître (France) G Raoux	7	6
(Italy) S Pescosolido (United States) J Sullivan	6	4
3	(United States) C Beckman (Australia) B Dyke	3	7	4
(South Africa) R Deppe (South Africa) B Haygarth	6	6	6
(The Bahamas) M Knowles (United States) A O'Brien	7	6	6
(Italy) G Pozzi (Finland) O Rahnasto	5	7	7
(Sweden) P Henricsson (United States) T J Middleton	7	6
(Switzerland) T Grin (Switzerland) M Rosset	6	3
WC	(United States) R Becker (United States) T Meringoff	1	4
4	(Brazil) J Oncins (Netherlands) J Siemerink	6	6
(United States) M Jensen (Argentina) G Markus	6	6
(Germany) C-U Steeb (Germany) M Zoecke	1	1
(United States) P Annacone (United States) J Brown	6	3
2	(United States) F Montana (United States) G Van Emburgh	7	6

Quarterfinals
1	(Czechoslovakia) M Damm (Czechoslovakia) C Suk	6	6
(France) O Delaître (France) G Raoux	3	4
(South Africa) R Deppe (South Africa) B Haygarth	3	7	6
(Italy) G Pozzi (Finland) O Rahnasto	6	6	7
(Sweden) P Henricsson (United States) T J Middleton	6	3	5
4	(Brazil) J Oncins (Netherlands) J Siemerink	4	6	7
(United States) M Jensen (Argentina) G Markus	3	1
2	(United States) F Montana (United States) G Van Emburgh	6	6

Semifinals
1	(Czechoslovakia) M Damm (Czechoslovakia) C Suk	6	3	5
(Italy) G Pozzi (Finland) O Rahnasto	4	6	7
4	(Brazil) J Oncins (Netherlands) J Siemerink	6	6	4
2	(United States) F Montana (United States) G Van Emburgh	3	7	6

Final
(Italy) G Pozzi (Finland) O Rahnasto	4	2
2	(United States) F Montana (United States) G Van Emburgh	6	6
