= 1989 Eagle Classic =

- Date: March 6–13
- Edition: 4th
- Category: Grand Prix (Super Series)
- Draw: 32S / 16D
- Prize money: $297,500
- Surface: Hard / outdoor
- Location: Scottsdale, Arizona, U.S.

Champions

Singles
- (Czechoslovakia) Ivan Lendl

Doubles
- (United States) Rick Leach / (United States) Jim Pugh
← 1988 ·	Eagle Classic	· 1992 →

The 1989 Eagle Classic was a men's tennis tournament played on outdoor hard courts in Scottsdale, Arizona in the United States, that was part of World Championship Tennis and the 1989 Nabisco Grand Prix. It was the fourth edition of the tournament and took place from March 6 through March 13, 1989. First-seeded Ivan Lendl won the singles title.

== Finals ==
=== Singles ===
(Czechoslovakia) Ivan Lendl defeated (Sweden) Stefan Edberg 6–2, 6–3

- It was Lendl's 2nd singles title of the year and the 75th of his career.

=== Doubles ===
(United States) Rick Leach / (United States) Jim Pugh defeated (United States) Paul Annacone / (South Africa) Christo van Rensburg 6–7, 6–3, 6–2, 2–6, 6–4

- It was Leach's 2nd title of the year and the 12th of his career. It was Pugh's 2nd title of the year and the 12th of his career.

== See also ==
- 1989 Virginia Slims of Arizona – women's tournament in Scottsdale
- Edberg–Lendl rivalry
