= 1992 ABN AMRO World Tennis Tournament =

- Date: 24 February – 1 March
- Edition: 20th
- Category: ATP World Series
- Draw: 32S / 16D
- Prize money: $475,000
- Surface: Carpet / indoor
- Location: Rotterdam, Netherlands
- Venue: Rotterdam Ahoy

Champions

Singles
- (Germany) Boris Becker

Doubles
- (Germany) Marc-Kevin Goellner / (Germany) David Prinosil
- ABN AMRO World Tennis Tournament

The 1992 ABN AMRO World Tennis Tournament was a men's tennis tournament played on indoor carpet courts. It was the 20th edition of the event known that year as the ABN AMRO World Tennis Tournament, and was part of the ATP World Series of the 1992 ATP Tour. It took place at the Rotterdam Ahoy indoor sporting arena in Rotterdam, Netherlands, from 24 February through 1 March 1992. Boris Becker won the singles title.

The singles line up featured ATP No. 2, Australian Open and Stuttgart indoor runner-up, US Open, Sydney indoor and Tokyo indoor champion Stefan Edberg, Wimbledon finalist, Stockholm and Brussels winner Boris Becker, and Long Island titlist Ivan Lendl. Also competing were Milan winner, Rotterdam defending champion Omar Camporese, Milan quarterfinalist Goran Prpić, John McEnroe, Alexander Volkov and Jonas Svensson.

== Finals ==
=== Singles ===
(Germany) Boris Becker defeated (Commonwealth of Independent States) Alexander Volkov, 7–6^{(11–9)}, 4–6, 6–2

- It was Boris Becker's 2nd title of the year, and his 33rd overall.

=== Doubles ===
(Germany) Marc-Kevin Goellner / (Germany) David Prinosil defeated (Netherlands) Paul Haarhuis / (Netherlands) Mark Koevermans 6–2, 6–7, 7–6
