= 1992 Waldbaum's Hamlet Cup =

Tennis tournament

- Date: August 24–30, 1992
- Edition: 12th
- Category: World Series
- Draw: 32S / 16D
- Prize money: $235,000
- Surface: Hard / outdoor
- Location: Commack, New York City, US

Champions

Singles
- (Czechoslovakia) Petr Korda

Doubles
- (United States) Francisco Montana / (United States) Greg Van Emburgh
← 1991 ·	Waldbaum's Hamlet Cup	· 1993 →

The 1992 Waldbaum's Hamlet Cup was a tennis tournament played on outdoor hard courts. It was the 12th edition of the event known that year as the Waldbaum's Hamlet Cup, and was part of the World Series of the 1992 ATP Tour. It took place at the Hamlet Golf and Country Club in Commack, Long Island, New York, United States, from August 24 through August 30, 1992.

The singles featured ATP No. 2, reigning US Open champion, Australian Open runner-up, Hamburg and New Haven winner Stefan Edberg, San Francisco, Indian Wells, Miami titlist Michael Chang, and Toronto, Cincinnati runner-up, Long Island defending champion Ivan Lendl. Other seeds were French Open finalist, Philadelphia winner Petr Korda, Brussels, Rotterdam champion Boris Becker, Sergi Bruguera, Alexander Volkov and Brad Gilbert.

== Finals ==
=== Singles ===
(Czechoslovakia) Petr Korda defeated (United States) Ivan Lendl, 6–2, 6–2

- It was Korda's 2nd singles title of the year and the 4th of his career.

=== Doubles ===
(United States) Francisco Montana / (United States) Greg Van Emburgh defeated (Italy) Gianluca Pozzi / (Finland) Olli Rahnasto, 6–4, 6–2
