= 1992 Donnay Indoor Championships – Singles =

Singles
- 1992 Donnay Indoor Championships

Final
- Champion: (Germany) Boris Becker
- Runner-up: (United States) Jim Courier
- Score: 6–7^{(5–7)}, 2–6, 7–6^{(12–10)}, 7–6^{(7–5)}, 7–5

Events
Singles	Doubles
← 1991 ·	Donnay Indoor Championships

Guy Forget was the defending champion, but lost in the semifinals this year.

Boris Becker won the title, defeating Jim Courier 6–7^{(5–7)}, 2–6, 7–6^{(12–10)}, 7–6^{(7–5)}, 7–5 in the final.

== Seeds ==
1. (Sweden) Stefan Edberg (semifinals)
2. (United States) Jim Courier (final)
3. (Germany) Boris Becker (champion)
4. (Czechoslovakia) Ivan Lendl (quarterfinals)
5. (France) Guy Forget (semifinals)
6. (Czechoslovakia) Petr Korda (first round)
7. (Czechoslovakia) Karel Nováček (quarterfinals)
8. (United States) Andre Agassi (second round)

== Draw ==
=== Key ===
- Q = Qualifier
- WC = Wild card
- LL = Lucky loser
- Alt = Alternate
- SE = Special exempt
- PR = Protected ranking
- ITF = ITF entry
- JE = Junior exempt
- w/o = Walkover
- r = Retired
- d = Defaulted
- SR = Special ranking

=== Finals ===
Semifinals
1/WC	(Sweden) Stefan Edberg	6	4	2
3/WC	(Germany) Boris Becker	4	6	6
5	(France) Guy Forget	6^{7}	4
2	(United States) Jim Courier	7^{9}	6

Final
3/WC	(Germany) Boris Becker	6^{5}	2	7^{12}	7^{7}	7
2	(United States) Jim Courier	7^{7}	6	6^{10}	6^{5}	5

=== Top half ===
First round
1/WC	(Sweden) S Edberg	6	4	6
(Spain) S Bruguera	4	6	4
Q	(France) Boetsch	3	6
(Netherlands) J Siemerink	6	7^{7}
Q	(Belgium) E Masso	6	6
(France) T Champion	2	1
(Croatia) G Prpić	4	6^{2}
7	(Czechoslovakia) K Nováček	6	7^{7}
3/WC	(Germany) B Becker	6	6
(Sweden) J Svensson	4	0
(Commonwealth of Independent States) A Cherkasov	4	6^{4}
(United States) P McEnroe	6	7^{7}
(Sweden) C Bergström	5	6	6^{5}
(Germany) C-U Steeb	7	3	7^{7}
(Sweden) A Järryd	3	6	6
6	(Czechoslovakia) P Korda	6	4	1

Second round
1/WC	(Sweden) S Edberg	7	6
(Netherlands) J Siemerink	5	2
Q	(Belgium) E Masso	4	2
7	(Czechoslovakia) K Nováček	6	6
3/WC	(Germany) B Becker	7^{8}	6
(United States) P McEnroe	6^{6}	1
(Germany) C-U Steeb	6	6
(Sweden) A Järryd	4	4

Quarterfinals
1/WC	(Sweden) S Edberg	6	6
7	(Czechoslovakia) K Nováček	2	1
3/WC	(Germany) B Becker	6	7^{7}
(Germany) C-U Steeb	3	6^{3}

Semifinals
1/WC	(Sweden) S Edberg	6	4	2
3/WC	(Germany) B Becker	4	6	6

=== Bottom half ===
First round
5	(France) G Forget	6	6
(Sweden) M Gustafsson	2	4
(United States) J McEnroe	3	7	6
(Netherlands) R Krajicek	6	5	2
(Switzerland) J Hlasek	3	3
(Croatia) G Ivanišević	6	6
Q	(Sweden) P Nyborg	7^{10}	5	2
4	(Czechoslovakia) I Lendl	6^{8}	7	6
8	(United States) A Agassi	6^{4}	7	6
Q	(Austria) A Antonitsch	7^{7}	5	3
(Commonwealth of Independent States) A Volkov	6^{5}	6	6
(France) C Pioline	7^{7}	4	3
(France) O Delaître	3	3
WC	(France) H Leconte	6	6
(France) F Santoro	2	1
2	(United States) J Courier	6	6

Second round
5	(France) G Forget	6	6
(United States) J McEnroe	3	2
(Croatia) G Ivanišević	7^{7}	5	4
4	(Czechoslovakia) I Lendl	6^{5}	7	6
8	(United States) A Agassi	6^{5}	3
(Commonwealth of Independent States) A Volkov	7^{7}	6
WC	(France) H Leconte	4	5
2	(United States) J Courier	6	7

Quarterfinals
5	(France) G Forget	6	7^{7}
4	(Czechoslovakia) I Lendl	2	6^{4}
(Commonwealth of Independent States) A Volkov	6^{6}	6^{4}
2	(United States) J Courier	7^{8}	7^{7}

Semifinals
5	(France) G Forget	6^{7}	4
2	(United States) J Courier	7^{9}	6
