= 1992 Donnay Indoor Championships – Doubles =

Doubles
- 1992 Donnay Indoor Championships

Final
- Champions: (Germany) Boris Becker (United States) John McEnroe
- Runners-up: (France) Guy Forget (Switzerland) Jakob Hlasek
- Score: 6–3, 6–2

Events
Singles	Doubles
← 1991 ·	Donnay Indoor Championships

Todd Woodbridge and Mark Woodforde were the defending champions, but did not participate this year.

Boris Becker and John McEnroe won the title, defeating Guy Forget and Jakob Hlasek 6–3, 6–2 in the final.

== Seeds ==
1. (Australia) John Fitzgerald / (Sweden) Anders Järryd (semifinals)
2. (United States) Luke Jensen / (Australia) Laurie Warder (quarterfinals)
3. (Netherlands) Tom Nijssen / (Czechoslovakia) Cyril Suk (first round)
4. (Croatia) Goran Ivanišević / (United States) Patrick McEnroe (first round)

== Draw ==
=== Key ===
- Q = Qualifier
- WC = Wild card
- LL = Lucky loser
- Alt = Alternate
- SE = Special exempt
- PR = Protected ranking
- ITF = ITF entry
- JE = Junior exempt
- w/o = Walkover
- r = Retired
- d = Defaulted
- SR = Special ranking

=== Draw ===
First round
1	(Australia) J Fitzgerald (Sweden) A Järryd	6	6
(Netherlands) J Eltingh (Netherlands) J Siemerink	0	2
(Netherlands) HJ Davids (Belgium) L Pimek	5	6
WC	(France) H Leconte (Czechoslovakia) I Lendl	7	7
4	(Croatia) G Ivanišević (United States) P McEnroe	6	6	3
(Czechoslovakia) P Korda (Czechoslovakia) K Nováček	7	4	6
(France) G Forget (Switzerland) J Hlasek	3	6	6
(United States) S DeVries (Australia) D Macpherson	6	4	4
WC	(Germany) B Becker (United States) J McEnroe	6	6
Q	(Iran) M Bahrami (France) A Boetsch	2	2
(Sweden) R Båthman (Sweden) R Bergh	4	6	6
3	(Netherlands) T Nijssen (Czechoslovakia) C Suk	6	3	3
(Czechoslovakia) V Flégl (United States) S Melville	7	4	4
(South Africa) S Kruger (South Africa) P Norval	5	6	6
(Israel) G Bloom (Kenya) P Wekesa	3	4
2	(United States) L Jensen (Australia) L Warder	6	6

Quarterfinals
1	(Australia) J Fitzgerald (Sweden) A Järryd	6	6
WC	(France) H Leconte (Czechoslovakia) I Lendl	2	4
(Czechoslovakia) P Korda (Czechoslovakia) K Nováček	6	3	4
(France) G Forget (Switzerland) J Hlasek	2	6	6
WC	(Germany) B Becker (United States) J McEnroe	7	6
(Sweden) R Båthman (Sweden) R Bergh	5	3
(South Africa) S Kruger (South Africa) P Norval	6	7
2	(United States) L Jensen (Australia) L Warder	3	6

Semifinals
1	(Australia) J Fitzgerald (Sweden) A Järryd	6	5
(France) G Forget (Switzerland) J Hlasek	7	7
WC	(Germany) B Becker (United States) J McEnroe	6	6
(South Africa) S Kruger (South Africa) P Norval	3	2

Final
(France) G Forget (Switzerland) J Hlasek	3	2
WC	(Germany) B Becker (United States) J McEnroe	6	6
