= 1991 Norstar Bank Hamlet Challenge Cup – Singles =

Singles
- 1991 Norstar Bank Hamlet Challenge Cup

Final
- Champion: (Czechoslovakia) Ivan Lendl
- Runner-up: (Sweden) Stefan Edberg
- Score: 6–3, 6–2

Details
- Draw: 32
- Seeds: 8

Events
Singles	Doubles
← 1990 ·	Norstar Bank Hamlet Challenge Cup	· 1992 →

The singles event of the 1991 Norstar Bank Hamlet Challenge Cup consisted of 32 players including eight seeded players. First-seeded Stefan Edberg was the defending champion, but second-seeded Ivan Lendl defeated him 6–3, 6–2, in the final. It was Lendl's 13th and last win against Edberg, taking their head-to-head to 13–10.

== Seeds ==
1. (Sweden) Stefan Edberg (final)
2. (Czechoslovakia) Ivan Lendl (champion)
3. (United States) David Wheaton (first round)
4. (United States) John McEnroe (semifinals)
5. (Socialist Federal Republic of Yugoslavia) Goran Ivanišević (first round)
6. (Sweden) Jonas Svensson (first round)
7. (Argentina) Alberto Mancini (first round)
8. (Italy) Omar Camporese (quarterfinals)

== Draw ==
=== Key ===
- Q = Qualifier
- WC = Wild card
- LL = Lucky loser
- Alt = Alternate
- SE = Special exempt
- PR = Protected ranking
- ITF = ITF entry
- JE = Junior exempt
- w/o = Walkover
- r = Retired
- d = Defaulted
- SR = Special ranking

=== Finals ===
Semifinals
1	(Sweden) Stefan Edberg	6	7
Q	(France) Olivier Delaître	1	6^{4}
4	(United States) John McEnroe	3	5
2/WC	(Czechoslovakia) Ivan Lendl	6	7

Final
1	(Sweden) Stefan Edberg	3	2
2/WC	(Czechoslovakia) Ivan Lendl	6	6

=== Top half ===
First round
1	(Sweden) S Edberg	6	6
Q	(United States) C Garner	1	1
(France) R Gilbert	6	1	1
(Sweden) P Lundgren	2	6	6
Q	(United States) T Martin	3	4
WC	(United States) J Connors	6	6
(Sweden) N Kulti	7	6
7	(Argentina) A Mancini	6^{1}	2
3/WC	(United States) D Wheaton	1	7	6^{5}
(Sweden) M Larsson	6	6^{2}	7
Q	(France) O Delaître	1	7	6
(Haiti) R Agénor	6	6^{3}	2
(France) J-P Fleurian	6	6
(Switzerland) M Rosset	1	2
(France) T Champion	6	6
5	(Socialist Federal Republic of Yugoslavia) G Ivanišević	2	1

Second round
1	(Sweden) S Edberg	6	6
(Sweden) P Lundgren	3	3
WC	(United States) J Connors	1	6	6
(Sweden) N Kulti	6	4	0
(Sweden) M Larsson	0	6	1
Q	(France) O Delaître	6	2	6
(France) J-P Fleurian	7	4	5
(France) T Champion	5	6	7

Quarterfinals
1	(Sweden) S Edberg	6	4	6
WC	(United States) J Connors	3	6	4
Q	(France) O Delaître	6	6
(France) T Champion	4	4

Semifinals
1	(Sweden) S Edberg	6	7
Q	(France) O Delaître	1	6^{4}

=== Bottom half ===
First round
6	(Sweden) J Svensson	6^{11}	5
(France) F Santoro	7	7
(Brazil) L Mattar	7	6
(Czechoslovakia) M Vajda	5	2
(Israel) A Mansdorf	6^{5}	4
Q	(Argentina) P Arnold	7	6
(Israel) G Bloom	4	6	1
4	(United States) J McEnroe	6	4	6
8	(Italy) O Camporese	6	6
(Brazil) J Oncins	2	2
(Netherlands) J Siemerink	6	4	3
(United States) P McEnroe	4	6	6
(Italy) D Nargiso	5	7	0
(Germany) E Jelen	7	6^{7}	6
(Germany) C-U Steeb	4	6	3
2/WC	(Czechoslovakia) I Lendl	6	3	6

Second round
(France) F Santoro	0	4
(Brazil) L Mattar	6	6
Q	(Argentina) P Arnold	1	3
4	(United States) J McEnroe	6	6
8	(Italy) O Camporese	6	3	6
(United States) P McEnroe	3	6	3
(Germany) E Jelen	2	0
2/WC	(Czechoslovakia) I Lendl	6	6

Quarterfinals
(Brazil) L Mattar	3	1
4	(United States) J McEnroe	6	6
8	(Italy) O Camporese	6^{5}	3
2/WC	(Czechoslovakia) I Lendl	7	6

Semifinals
4	(United States) J McEnroe	3	5
2/WC	(Czechoslovakia) I Lendl	6	7
