= 1993 Qatar Open – Doubles =

Doubles
- 1993 Qatar Open

Final
- Champions: (Germany) Boris Becker (Germany) Patrik Kühnen
- Runners-up: (United States) Shelby Cannon (United States) Scott Melville
- Score: 6–2, 6–4

Details
- Draw: 16
- Seeds: 4

Events
Singles	Doubles
ATP Qatar Open	· 1994 →

This was the first edition of the event.

Boris Becker and Patrik Kühnen won the title, defeating Shelby Cannon and Scott Melville 6–2, 6–4 in the final.

== Seeds ==
1. (Netherlands) Tom Nijssen / (Czech Republic) Cyril Suk (semifinals)
2. N/A
3. (Netherlands) Hendrik Jan Davids / (Belgium) Libor Pimek (quarterfinals)
4. (Italy) Diego Nargiso / (Spain) Javier Sánchez (quarterfinals)

== Draw ==
=== Key ===
- Q = Qualifier
- WC = Wild card
- LL = Lucky loser
- Alt = Alternate
- ITF = ITF entry
- PR = Protected ranking
- SR = Special ranking
- SE = Special exempt
- JE = Junior exempt
- JR = Junior Accelerator Programme entrant
- CO = College Accelerator Programme entrant
- NG = Next Gen Accelerator Program entrant
- w/o = Walkover
- r = Retired
- d = Defaulted

=== Draw ===
First round
1	(Netherlands) T Nijssen (Czech Republic) C Suk	6	7
Q	(Germany) K Braasch (Germany) M Zoecke	3	5
(Czech Republic) M Damm (Czech Republic) V Flégl	6	6	6
(Germany) M-K Goellner (Netherlands) J Siemerink	7	4	2
4	(Italy) D Nargiso (Spain) J Sánchez	3	6	7
(United States) L Jensen (United States) M Jensen	6	0	6
(Germany) B Becker (Germany) P Kühnen	3	6	7
(Latvia) Ģ Dzelde (Russia) A Olhovskiy	6	3	5
(United Kingdom) J Bates (South Africa) G Muller	6	6
WC	(Qatar) N Al-Khelaifi (Russia) A Cherkasov	3	3
(Sweden) S Edberg (Germany) U Riglewski	4	3
3	(Netherlands) HJ Davids (Belgium) L Pimek	6	6
(Spain) T Carbonell (Netherlands) M Schapers	3	6	3
(United States) B Garnett (United States) TJ Middleton	6	1	6
(United States) S Cannon (United States) S Melville	6	6
LL	(Russia) A Merinov (Italy) G Pozzi	1	0

Quarterfinals
1	(Netherlands) T Nijssen (Czech Republic) C Suk	6	6
(Czech Republic) M Damm (Czech Republic) V Flégl	1	3
4	(Italy) D Nargiso (Spain) J Sánchez	6	7	6
(Germany) B Becker (Germany) P Kühnen	7	5	7
(United Kingdom) J Bates (South Africa) G Muller	7	6	6
3	(Netherlands) HJ Davids (Belgium) L Pimek	6	7	2
(United States) B Garnett (United States) TJ Middleton	4	7	3
(United States) S Cannon (United States) S Melville	6	6	6

Semifinals
1	(Netherlands) T Nijssen (Czech Republic) C Suk	4	2
(Germany) B Becker (Germany) P Kühnen	6	6
(United Kingdom) J Bates (South Africa) G Muller	4	6
(United States) S Cannon (United States) S Melville	6	7

Final
(Germany) B Becker (Germany) P Kühnen	6	6
(United States) S Cannon (United States) S Melville	2	4
