= 1988 Eagle Classic – Singles =

Tennis tournament

Singles
- 1988 Eagle Classic

Final
- Champion: (Sweden) Mikael Pernfors
- Runner-up: (United States) Glenn Layendecker
- Score: 6–2, 6–4

Details
- Draw: 32
- Seeds: 8

Events
Singles	Doubles
← 1987 ·	Eagle Classic	· 1989 →

Brad Gilbert was the defending champion, but lost in the first round this year.

Mikael Pernfors won the title, defeating Glenn Layendecker 6–2, 6–4 in the final.

== Seeds ==
1. (United States) Brad Gilbert (first round)
2. (United States) Kevin Curren (semifinals)
3. (Sweden) Mikael Pernfors (champion)
4. (United States) Dan Goldie (second round)
5. (United States) Jay Berger (first round)
6. (United States) Michael Chang (second round)
7. (Australia) Mark Woodforde (second round)
8. (United States) Derrick Rostagno (quarterfinals)

== Draw ==
=== Key ===
- Q = Qualifier
- WC = Wild card
- LL = Lucky loser
- Alt = Alternate
- SE = Special exempt
- PR = Protected ranking
- ITF = ITF entry
- JE = Junior exempt
- w/o = Walkover
- r = Retired
- d = Defaulted
- SR = Special ranking

=== Finals ===
Semifinals
Q	(United States) Glenn Layendecker	3	6	6
(United States) Jim Pugh	6	4	1
WC/3	(Sweden) Mikael Pernfors	4	6	6
2	(United States) Kevin Curren	6	2	3

Final
Q	(United States) Glenn Layendecker	2	4
WC/3	(Sweden) Mikael Pernfors	6	6

=== Top half ===
First round
1	(United States) B Gilbert	3	7	4
Q	(United States) G Layendecker	6	5	6
Q	(United States) D Cassidy	0	1
(United States) T Wilkison	6	6
WC	(United States) P McEnroe	3	6	2
(South Africa) P Aldrich	6	3	6
(United States) J Arias	2	3
7	(Australia) M Woodforde	6	6
4	(United States) D Goldie	6	2	6
(United States) M Anger	4	6	4
(Peru) J Yzaga	1	3
(United States) D Pate	6	6
(United States) M Robertson	2	6
(United States) J Pugh	6	7
(Australia) C Limberger	3	2
6	(United States) M Chang	6	6

Second round
Q	(United States) G Layendecker	6	7
(United States) T Wilkison	2	6
(South Africa) P Aldrich	7	6
7	(Australia) M Woodforde	5	3
4	(United States) D Goldie	3	6	5
(United States) D Pate	6	3	7
(United States) J Pugh	6	5	6
6	(United States) M Chang	4	7	4

Quarterfinals
Q	(United States) G Layendecker	7	7
(South Africa) P Aldrich	5	6
(United States) D Pate	7	5	6
(United States) J Pugh	6	7	7

Semifinals
Q	(United States) G Layendecker	3	6	6
(United States) J Pugh	6	4	1

=== Bottom half ===
First round
5	(United States) J Berger	6	1
(United States) J Grabb	7	6
(Sweden) T Svantesson	7	6
(United States) T Witsken	6	4
(South Africa) D Visser	6	6	1
(South Africa) C van Rensburg	4	7	6
(South Africa) G Muller	4	0
WC/3	(Sweden) M Pernfors	6	6
8	(United States) D Rostagno	6	6
Q	(United States) B Pearce	3	4
WC	(United States) T Ho	4	1
(United States) J Kriek	6	6
(United States) J Courier	3	1
Q	(United States) P Sampras	6	6
(United States) R Reneberg	4	6	5
2	(United States) K Curren	6	1	7

Second round
(United States) J Grabb	6	4	6
(Sweden) T Svantesson	3	6	7
(South Africa) C van Rensburg	3	6	3
WC/3	(Sweden) M Pernfors	6	4	6
8	(United States) D Rostagno	6	2	7
(United States) J Kriek	3	6	6
Q	(United States) P Sampras	7	6	6
2	(United States) K Curren	6	7	7

Quarterfinals
(Sweden) T Svantesson	3	2
WC/3	(Sweden) M Pernfors	6	6
8	(United States) D Rostagno	2	4
2	(United States) K Curren	6	6

Semifinals
WC/3	(Sweden) M Pernfors	4	6	6
2	(United States) K Curren	6	2	3
