= 1991 Donnay Indoor Championships – Singles =

Singles
- 1991 Donnay Indoor Championships

Final
- Champion: (France) Guy Forget
- Runner-up: (Soviet Union) Andrei Cherkasov
- Score: 6–3, 7–5, 3–6, 7–6

Details
- Draw: 32
- Seeds: 8

Events
Singles	Doubles
← 1990 ·	Donnay Indoor Championships	· 1992 →

Boris Becker was the defending champion, but retired from his semifinals match this year.

Guy Forget won the title, defeating Andrei Cherkasov 6–3, 7–5, 3–6, 7–6 in the final.

== Seeds ==
1. (West Germany) Boris Becker (semifinals, retired)
2. (Sweden) Stefan Edberg (semifinals)
3. (United States) Andre Agassi (first round)
4. (France) Guy Forget (champion)
5. (Sweden) Jonas Svensson (first round)
6. (Soviet Union) Andrei Chesnokov (quarterfinals)
7. (United States) Michael Chang (quarterfinals)
8. (Switzerland) Jakob Hlasek (quarterfinals)

== Draw ==
=== Key ===
- Q = Qualifier
- WC = Wild card
- LL = Lucky loser
- Alt = Alternate
- SE = Special exempt
- PR = Protected ranking
- ITF = ITF entry
- JE = Junior exempt
- w/o = Walkover
- r = Retired
- d = Defaulted
- SR = Special ranking

=== Finals ===
Semifinals
1	(Germany) Boris Becker	6	3	2^{r}
WC	(Soviet Union) Andrei Cherkasov	2	6	2
4	(France) Guy Forget	3	6	6
2	(Sweden) Stefan Edberg	6	0	3

Final
WC	(Soviet Union) Andrei Cherkasov	3	5	6	6
4	(France) Guy Forget	6	7	3	7

=== Top half ===
First round
1	(Germany) B Becker	6	3	6
(Soviet Union) A Volkov	4	6	3
Q	(Germany) E Jelen	7	6
Q	(Czechoslovakia) S Doseděl	6	3
Q	(France) A Boetsch	6	2	6
(Austria) H Skoff	4	6	4
(Australia) T Woodbridge	4	3
7	(United States) M Chang	6	6
3	(United States) A Agassi	3	6
Q	(Germany) C Saceanu	6	7
WC	(Soviet Union) A Cherkasov	6	6
(Spain) J Aguilera	2	2
(France) H Leconte	7	4	2
(Socialist Federal Republic of Yugoslavia) G Prpić	6	6	6
LL	(Sweden) C Bergström	6	4	4
6	(Soviet Union) A Chesnokov	3	6	6

Second round
1	(Germany) B Becker	7	7
Q	(Germany) E Jelen	6	6
Q	(France) A Boetsch	3	2
7	(United States) M Chang	6	6
Q	(Germany) C Saceanu	4	2
WC	(Soviet Union) A Cherkasov	6	6
(Socialist Federal Republic of Yugoslavia) G Prpić	4	6
6	(Soviet Union) A Chesnokov	6	7

Quarterfinals
1	(Germany) B Becker	7	6
7	(United States) M Chang	5	1
WC	(Soviet Union) A Cherkasov	7	6
6	(Soviet Union) A Chesnokov	5	1

Semifinals
1	(Germany) B Becker	6	3	2^{r}
WC	(Soviet Union) A Cherkasov	2	6	2

=== Bottom half ===
First round
5	(Sweden) J Svensson	0	4
(Switzerland) M Rosset	6	6
(Germany) C-U Steeb	2	5
(Haiti) R Agénor	6	7
WC	(Belgium) E Masso	6	6	6
(Australia) R Fromberg	3	7	3
(Israel) A Mansdorf	6	3	3
4	(France) G Forget	4	6	6
8	(Switzerland) J Hlasek	6	6
(Sweden) M Larsson	3	2
(Sweden) M Wilander	6	7
(Italy) O Camporese	4	6
(Czechoslovakia) K Nováček	6	6	3
WC	(Australia) P Cash	2	7	6
(Sweden) M Gustafsson	0	4
2	(Sweden) S Edberg	6	6

Second round
(Switzerland) M Rosset	6	6
(Haiti) R Agénor	4	3
WC	(Belgium) E Masso	1	2
4	(France) G Forget	6	6
8	(Switzerland) J Hlasek	6	7
(Sweden) M Wilander	1	5
WC	(Australia) P Cash	6	1	4
2	(Sweden) S Edberg	3	6	6

Quarterfinals
(Switzerland) M Rosset	2	5
4	(France) G Forget	6	7
8	(Switzerland) J Hlasek	1	2
2	(Sweden) S Edberg	6	6

Semifinals
4	(France) G Forget	3	6	6
2	(Sweden) S Edberg	6	0	3
