= 1990 Norstar Bank Hamlet Challenge Cup – Singles =

Singles
- 1990 Norstar Bank Hamlet Challenge Cup

Final
- Champion: (Sweden) Stefan Edberg
- Runner-up: (Socialist Federal Republic of Yugoslavia) Goran Ivanišević
- Score: 7–6^{(7–3)}, 6–3

Details
- Draw: 28
- Seeds: 8

Events
| Singles | Doubles |
| ← 1989 · | Norstar Bank Hamlet Challenge Cup | · 1991 → |

Ivan Lendl was the defending champion (the previous year was an exhibition), but chose not to participate that year.

Stefan Edberg won in the final 7–6^{(7–3)}, 6–3, against Goran Ivanišević.

== Seeds ==
The top four seeds receive a bye into the second round.

1. (Sweden) Stefan Edberg (champion)
2. (Ecuador) Andrés Gómez (quarterfinals)
3. (United States) Brad Gilbert (quarterfinals)
4. (United States) Pete Sampras (quarterfinals)
5. (Socialist Federal Republic of Yugoslavia) Goran Ivanišević (final)
6. (United States) John McEnroe (semifinals)
7. (Sweden) Jonas Svensson (quarterfinals)
8. (France) Guy Forget (semifinals)

== Draw ==
=== Key ===
- Q = Qualifier
- WC = Wild card
- LL = Lucky loser
- Alt = Alternate
- SE = Special exempt
- PR = Protected ranking
- ITF = ITF entry
- JE = Junior exempt
- w/o = Walkover
- r = Retired
- d = Defaulted
- SR = Special ranking

=== Finals ===
Semifinals
1 | (Sweden) Stefan Edberg | 6 | 6
6/WC | (United States) John McEnroe | 1 | 4
5 | (Socialist Federal Republic of Yugoslavia) Goran Ivanišević | 6 | 1 | 6
8 | (France) Guy Forget | 2 | 6 | 3

Final
1 | (Sweden) Stefan Edberg | 7^{7} | 6
5 | (Socialist Federal Republic of Yugoslavia) Goran Ivanišević | 6^{3} | 3

=== Top half ===
First round
WC | (United States) D Wheaton | 6 | 3 | 6
(United States) J Arias | 3 | 6 | 1
(Austria) A Antonitsch | 4 | 3
WC | (France) Y Noah | 6 | 6
(France) O Delaître | 3 | 4
7 | (Sweden) J Svensson | 6 | 6
(West Germany) U Riglewski | 2 | 6 | 0
(Germany) C-U Steeb | 6 | 4 | 6
(Spain) S Bruguera | 6 | 1 | 3
(Germany) M Stich | 3 | 6 | 6
Q | (Australia) N Borwick | 4 | 1
6/WC | (United States) J McEnroe | 6 | 6

Second round
1 | (Sweden) S Edberg | 3 | 6 | 6
WC | (United States) D Wheaton | 6 | 1 | 2
WC | (France) Y Noah | 4 | 4
7 | (Sweden) J Svensson | 6 | 6
3 | (United States) B Gilbert | 2 | 6 | 7
(Germany) C-U Steeb | 6 | 1 | 5
(Germany) M Stich | 3 | 5
6/WC | (United States) J McEnroe | 6 | 7

Quarterfinals
1 | (Sweden) S Edberg | 6 | 6
7 | (Sweden) J Svensson | 4 | 2
3 | (United States) B Gilbert | 3 | 2
6/WC | (United States) J McEnroe | 6 | 6

Semifinals
1 | (Sweden) S Edberg | 6 | 6
6/WC | (United States) J McEnroe | 1 | 4

=== Bottom half ===
First round
5 | (Socialist Federal Republic of Yugoslavia) G Ivanišević | 6 | 6
Q | (Italy) G Pozzi | 3 | 1
Q | (South Africa) W Ferreira | 6 | 6
(Haiti) R Agénor | 4 | 3
Q | (United States) F Montana | 6 | 6 | 6
(France) J-P Fleurian | 7 | 2 | 3
8 | (France) G Forget | 7 | 7
(South Africa) G Muller | 6 | 6
(Israel) G Bloom | 1 | 2
(Netherlands) P Haarhuis | 6 | 6
(United States) B Shelton | 6 | 6 | 1
(Germany) E Jelen | 7 | 0 | 6

Second round
5 | (Socialist Federal Republic of Yugoslavia) G Ivanišević | 6 | 2 | 6
Q | (South Africa) W Ferreira | 2 | 6 | 3
Q | (United States) F Montana | 4 | 6
4 | (United States) P Sampras | 6 | 7
8 | (France) G Forget | 6 | 6
(Netherlands) P Haarhuis | 3 | 3
(Germany) E Jelen | 4 | 6 | 3
2 | (Ecuador) A Gómez | 6 | 3 | 6

Quarterfinals
5 | (Socialist Federal Republic of Yugoslavia) G Ivanišević | 7^{7} | 6
4 | (United States) P Sampras | 6^{5} | 3
8 | (France) G Forget | 6^{4} | 6 | 7
2 | (Ecuador) A Gómez | 7^{7} | 0 | 5

Semifinals
5 | (Socialist Federal Republic of Yugoslavia) G Ivanišević | 6 | 1 | 6
8 | (France) G Forget | 2 | 6 | 3
