= 1989 Eagle Classic – Doubles =

Tennis tournament

Doubles
- 1989 Eagle Classic

Final
- Champions: (United States) Rick Leach (United States) Jim Pugh
- Runners-up: (United States) Paul Annacone (South Africa) Christo van Rensburg
- Score: 6–7, 6–3, 6–2, 2–6, 6–4

Details
- Draw: 16
- Seeds: 4

Events
Singles	Doubles
- Eagle Classic

Scott Davis and Tim Wilkison were the defending champions but lost in the first round to Tim Pawsat and Laurie Warder.

Rick Leach and Jim Pugh won in the final 6–7, 6–3, 6–2, 2–6, 6–4 against Paul Annacone and Christo van Rensburg.

== Seeds ==
1. (United States) Ken Flach / (United States) Robert Seguso (quarterfinals)
2. (Spain) Sergio Casal / (Spain) Emilio Sánchez (quarterfinals)
3. (United States) Rick Leach / (United States) Jim Pugh (champions)
4. (United States) Paul Annacone / (South Africa) Christo van Rensburg (final)

== Draw ==
Key

- Q = Qualifier
- WC = Wild card
- LL = Lucky loser
- Alt = Alternate
- ITF = ITF entry
- PR = Protected ranking
- SR = Special ranking
- SE = Special exempt
- JE = Junior exempt
- JR = Junior Accelerator Programme entrant
- CO = College Accelerator Programme entrant
- NG = Next Gen Accelerator Program entrant
- w/o = Walkover
- r = Retired
- d = Defaulted

=== Draw ===
First round
1	(United States) K Flach (United States) R Seguso	4	7	6
(Sweden) P Lundgren (Netherlands) T Nijssen	6	6	2
(United States) J Kriek (Australia) W Masur	3	4
(United States) K Curren (United States) D Pate	6	6
3	(United States) R Leach (United States) J Pugh	6	6	7
(United States) J Grabb (United States) P McEnroe	1	7	6
(United States) S Giammalva Jr. (United States) R Van't Hof	2	2
(Czechoslovakia) I Lendl (Israel) A Mansdorf	6	6
(South Africa) P Aldrich (South Africa) D Visser	6	6
(United States) E Korita (United States) J Levine	1	3
(Mexico) L Lavalle (Spain) J Sánchez	7	3	2
4	(United States) P Annacone (South Africa) C van Rensburg	6	6	6
(United States) S Davis (United States) T Wilkison	3	1
(United States) T Pawsat (Australia) L Warder	6	6
(Sweden) S Edberg (Australia) M Woodforde	4	6	4
2	(Spain) S Casal (Spain) E Sánchez	6	2	6

Quarterfinals
1	(United States) K Flach (United States) R Seguso	5	6	3
(United States) K Curren (United States) D Pate	7	3	6
3	(United States) R Leach (United States) J Pugh	6	6
(Czechoslovakia) I Lendl (Israel) A Mansdorf	4	4
(South Africa) P Aldrich (South Africa) D Visser	6	6
4	(United States) P Annacone (South Africa) C van Rensburg	7	7
(United States) T Pawsat (Australia) L Warder	6	6	7
2	(Spain) S Casal (Spain) E Sánchez	4	7	6

Semifinals
(United States) K Curren (United States) D Pate	3	6	4
3	(United States) R Leach (United States) J Pugh	6	3	6
4	(United States) P Annacone (South Africa) C van Rensburg	6	6
(United States) T Pawsat (Australia) L Warder	3	4

Final
3	(United States) R Leach (United States) J Pugh	6	6	6
4	(United States) P Annacone (South Africa) C van Rensburg	7	3	2
