= 1993 Waldbaum's Hamlet Cup – Doubles =

Doubles
- 1993 Waldbaum's Hamlet Cup

Final
- Champions: (Germany) Marc-Kevin Goellner (Germany) David Prinosil
- Runners-up: (France) Arnaud Boetsch (France) Olivier Delaître
- Score: 6–7, 7–5, 6–2

Events
Singles	Doubles
← 1992 ·	Waldbaum's Hamlet Cup	· 1994 →

Francisco Montana and Greg Van Emburgh were the defending champions, but chose not to participate that year.

Marc-Kevin Goellner and David Prinosil won in the final 6–7, 7–5, 6–2, against Arnaud Boetsch and Olivier Delaître.

== Seeds ==
1. (United States) Steve DeVries / (Australia) David Macpherson (quarterfinals)
2. (Canada) Glenn Michibata / (United States) David Pate (first round)
3. (United States) Shelby Cannon / (United States) Scott Melville (semifinals)
4. (Germany) Marc-Kevin Goellner / (Germany) David Prinosil (champions)

== Draw ==
=== Key ===
- Q = Qualifier
- WC = Wild card
- LL = Lucky loser
- Alt = Alternate
- ITF = ITF entry
- PR = Protected ranking
- SR = Special ranking
- SE = Special exempt
- JE = Junior exempt
- JR = Junior Accelerator Programme entrant
- CO = College Accelerator Programme entrant
- NG = Next Gen Accelerator Program entrant
- w/o = Walkover
- r = Retired
- d = Defaulted

=== Draw ===
First round
1	(United States) S DeVries (Australia) D Macpherson	5	6	6
(Czech Republic) M Damm (United States) K Thorne	7	3	1
WC	(Spain) S Bruguera (Switzerland) M Rosset	3	5
(Mexico) J Lozano (Venezuela) N Pereira	6	7
4	(Germany) M-K Goellner (Germany) D Prinosil	6	6	7
(Czech Republic) C Suk (Czech Republic) D Vacek	4	7	6
(Spain) T Carbonell (Belgium) L Pimek	0	6	6
Q	(United Kingdom) A Foster (United States) J Sullivan	6	2	7
(Netherlands) S Groen (Netherlands) J Siemerink	7	6
(United States) B Garnett (United States) T J Middleton	6	2
(South Africa) M Barnard (United States) T Mercer	4	1
3	(United States) S Cannon (United States) S Melville	6	6
(United States) B Gilbert (Germany) C-U Steeb	7	4	6
(South Africa) R Deppe (South Africa) B Haygarth	6	6	2
(France) A Boetsch (France) O Delaître	6	7
2	(Canada) G Michibata (United States) D Pate	4	6

Quarterfinals
1	(United States) S DeVries (Australia) D Macpherson	4	7	3
(Mexico) J Lozano (Venezuela) N Pereira	6	5	6
4	(Germany) M-K Goellner (Germany) D Prinosil	3	6	7
(United Kingdom) A Foster (United States) J Sullivan	6	4	6
(Netherlands) S Groen (Netherlands) J Siemerink	4	4
3	(United States) S Cannon (United States) S Melville	6	6
(United States) B Gilbert (Germany) C-U Steeb	2	6	1
(France) A Boetsch (France) O Delaître	6	3	6

Semifinals
(Mexico) J Lozano (Venezuela) N Pereira	6	1
4	(Germany) M-K Goellner (Germany) D Prinosil	7	6
3	(United States) S Cannon (United States) S Melville	4	7	5
(France) A Boetsch (France) O Delaître	6	6	7

Final
4	(Germany) M-K Goellner (Germany) D Prinosil	6	7	6
(France) A Boetsch (France) O Delaître	7	5	2
