= 1992 Waldbaum's Hamlet Cup – Singles =

Singles
- 1992 Waldbaum's Hamlet Cup
- 1991 Champion: (Czechoslovakia) Ivan Lendl

Final
- Champion: (Czechoslovakia) Petr Korda
- Runner-up: (United States) Ivan Lendl
- Score: 6–2, 6–2

Details
- Draw: 32
- Seeds: 8

Events
Singles	Doubles
← 1991 ·	Waldbaum's Hamlet Cup	· 1993 →

Ivan Lendl was the defending champion, but Petr Korda defeated him 6–2, 6–2, in the final.

== Seeds ==
1. (Sweden) Stefan Edberg (semifinals)
2. (United States) Michael Chang (semifinals)
3. (United States) Ivan Lendl (final)
4. (Czechoslovakia) Petr Korda (champion)
5. (Germany) Boris Becker (quarterfinals, withdrew)
6. (Spain) Sergi Bruguera (first round)
7. (Commonwealth of Independent States) Alexander Volkov (quarterfinals)
8. (United States) Brad Gilbert (second round)

== Draw ==
=== Key ===
- Q = Qualifier
- WC = Wild card
- LL = Lucky loser
- Alt = Alternate
- ITF = ITF entry
- PR = Protected ranking
- SR = Special ranking
- SE = Special exempt
- JE = Junior exempt
- JR = Junior Accelerator Programme entrant
- CO = College Accelerator Programme entrant
- NG = Next Gen Accelerator Program entrant
- w/o = Walkover
- r = Retired
- d = Defaulted

=== Finals ===
Semifinals
1	(Sweden) Stefan Edberg	5	5
4	(Czechoslovakia) Petr Korda	7	7
3	(United States) Ivan Lendl	6	6
2	(United States) Michael Chang	2	3

Final
4	(Czechoslovakia) Petr Korda	6	6
3	(United States) Ivan Lendl	2	2

=== Top half ===
First round
1	(Sweden) S Edberg	6	7
SE	(Germany) M Zoecke	2	5
WC	(United States) J Arias	4	6	6
(Sweden) M Larsson	6	3	3
WC	(United States) P Annacone	2	6	2
Q	(Germany) C Arriens	6	2	6
Q	(South Africa) C Marsh	3	2
8	(United States) B Gilbert	6	6
4	(Czechoslovakia) P Korda	6	6
(Brazil) J Oncins	0	2
(Sweden) M Gustafsson	6^{3}	6	6
(France) C Pioline	7	3	4
(Argentina) G Markus	6	2	0
(Italy) O Camporese	3	6	6
(Italy) S Pescosolido	0	6	6
6	(Spain) S Bruguera	6	3	1

Second round
1	(Sweden) S Edberg	7	6
WC	(United States) J Arias	6^{3}	2
Q	(Germany) C Arriens	7	7
8	(United States) B Gilbert	6^{6}	6^{4}
4	(Czechoslovakia) P Korda	6	6
(Sweden) M Gustafsson	3	4
(Italy) O Camporese	3	4
(Italy) S Pescosolido	6	6

Quarterfinals
1	(Sweden) S Edberg	6	6
Q	(Germany) C Arriens	4	0
4	(Czechoslovakia) P Korda	7	6
(Italy) S Pescosolido	6^{4}	2

Semifinals
1	(Sweden) S Edberg	5	5
4	(Czechoslovakia) P Korda	7	7

=== Bottom half ===
First round
5/WC	(Germany) B Becker	6	6
(Argentina) A Mancini	3	2
(Germany) C-U Steeb	6	6
(France) A Boetsch	3	3
(France) O Delaître	3	7	7
(France) F Santoro	6	6^{5}	6^{4}
Q	(Italy) C Caratti	1	1
3	(United States) I Lendl	6	6
7	(Commonwealth of Independent States) A Volkov	6	6
(Switzerland) M Rosset	3	4
Q	(Brazil) D Marcelino	6^{5}	4
(Sweden) C Bergström	7	6
(United States) J Connors	6	6
(Sweden) N Kulti	3	4
(Italy) G Pozzi	0	6	1
2	(United States) M Chang	6	4	6

Second round
5/WC	(Germany) B Becker	4	6	6
(Germany) C-U Steeb	6	1	4
(France) O Delaître	4	1
3	(United States) I Lendl	6	6
7	(Commonwealth of Independent States) A Volkov	6	4	7
(Sweden) C Bergström	4	6	5
(United States) J Connors
2	(United States) M Chang	w/o

Quarterfinals
5/WC	(Germany) B Becker
3	(United States) I Lendl	w/o
7	(Commonwealth of Independent States) A Volkov	1	3
2	(United States) M Chang	6	6

Semifinals
3	(United States) I Lendl	6	6
2	(United States) M Chang	2	3
