= 1992 ABN AMRO World Tennis Tournament – Doubles =

Doubles
- 1992 ABN AMRO World Tennis Tournament

Final
- Champions: (Germany) Marc-Kevin Goellner (Germany) David Prinosil
- Runners-up: (Netherlands) Paul Haarhuis (Netherlands) Mark Koevermans
- Score: 6–2, 6–7, 7–6

Details
- Draw: 16
- Seeds: 4

Events
| Singles | Doubles |
- ABN AMRO World Tennis Tournament

Patrick Galbraith and Anders Järryd were the defending champions, but Galbraith chose not to participate, and only Jarryd competed that year.
Jarryd partnered with John Fitzgerald, but lost in the first round to Marc-Kevin Goellner and David Prinosil.

Marc-Kevin Goellner and David Prinosil won in the final 6–2, 6–7, 7–6, against Paul Haarhuis and Mark Koevermans.

== Seeds ==
1. (Australia) John Fitzgerald / (Sweden) Anders Järryd (first round)
2. (Netherlands) Tom Nijssen / (Czechoslovakia) Cyril Suk (quarterfinals)
3. (Netherlands) Paul Haarhuis / (Netherlands) Mark Koevermans (final)
4. (United States) Jim Grabb / (Netherlands) Jan Siemerink (quarterfinals)

== Draw ==
Key

- Q = Qualifier
- WC = Wild card
- LL = Lucky loser
- Alt = Alternate
- ITF = ITF entry
- PR = Protected ranking
- SR = Special ranking
- SE = Special exempt
- JE = Junior exempt
- JR = Junior Accelerator Programme entrant
- CO = College Accelerator Programme entrant
- NG = Next Gen Accelerator Program entrant
- w/o = Walkover
- r = Retired
- d = Defaulted

=== Draw ===
First round
1 | (Australia) J Fitzgerald (Sweden) A Järryd | 3 | 3
LL | (Germany) M-K Goellner (Germany) D Prinosil | 6 | 6
Q | (Germany) P Baur (Germany) C Saceanu | 5 | 3
(Netherlands) M Schapers (Czechoslovakia) D Vacek | 7 | 6
4 | (United States) J Grabb (Netherlands) J Siemerink | 6 | 6 | 6
WC | (Socialist Federal Republic of Yugoslavia) G Prpić (Sweden) J Svensson | 7 | 3 | 2
(Spain) T Carbonell (Italy) D Nargiso | 5 | 6 | 6
WC | (Netherlands) M Oosting (Netherlands) F Wibier | 7 | 4 | 1
(United States) C Beckman (United States) S Melville | 4 | 4
(Netherlands) HJ Davids (Belgium) L Pimek | 6 | 6
(Sweden) J Gunnarsson (Germany) U Riglewski | 4 | 7 | 3
3 | (Netherlands) P Haarhuis (Netherlands) M Koevermans | 6 | 6 | 6
(United States) S DeVries (Australia) D Macpherson | 7 | 4 | 6
(Netherlands) J Eltingh (Netherlands) T Kempers | 6 | 6 | 7
(Czechoslovakia) V Flegl (Kenya) P Wekesa | 2 | 4
2 | (Netherlands) T Nijssen (Czechoslovakia) C Suk | 6 | 6

Quarterfinals
LL | (Germany) M-K Goellner (Germany) D Prinosil | 6 | 7
(Netherlands) M Schapers (Czechoslovakia) D Vacek | 4 | 6
4 | (United States) J Grabb (Netherlands) J Siemerink | 5 | 6
(Spain) T Carbonell (Italy) D Nargiso | 7 | 7
(Netherlands) HJ Davids (Belgium) L Pimek | 6 | 6 | 4
3 | (Netherlands) P Haarhuis (Netherlands) M Koevermans | 2 | 7 | 6
(Netherlands) J Eltingh (Netherlands) T Kempers | 7 | 6
2 | (Netherlands) T Nijssen (Czechoslovakia) C Suk | 5 | 3

Semifinals
LL | (Germany) M-K Goellner (Germany) D Prinosil | 6 | 7
(Spain) T Carbonell (Italy) D Nargiso | 4 | 5
3 | (Netherlands) P Haarhuis (Netherlands) M Koevermans | 6 | 6
(Netherlands) J Eltingh (Netherlands) T Kempers | 4 | 3

Final
LL | (Germany) M-K Goellner (Germany) D Prinosil | 6 | 6 | 7
3 | (Netherlands) P Haarhuis (Netherlands) M Koevermans | 2 | 7 | 6
