= 1993 Qatar Open =

- Date: 4–11 January
- Edition: 1st
- Category: World Series
- Draw: 32S / 16D
- Prize money: $450,000
- Surface: Hard / outdoor
- Location: Doha, Qatar

Champions

Singles
- (Germany) Boris Becker

Doubles
- (Germany) Boris Becker / (Germany) Patrik Kühnen
ATP Qatar Open	· 1994 →

The 1993 Qatar Open, known as the Qatar Mobil Open for sponsorship reasons, was an ATP Tour men's tennis tournament held on outdoor hardcourts in Doha, Qatar from 4 January until 11 January 1993. It was the inaugural edition of the tournament. Third-seeded Boris Becker won the singles title.

== Finals ==
=== Singles ===
(Germany) Boris Becker defeated (Croatia) Goran Ivanišević, 7–6^{(7–4)}, 4–6, 7–5

- It was Becker's 1st singles title of the year and the 37th of his career.

=== Doubles ===
(Germany) Boris Becker / (Germany) Patrik Kühnen defeated (United States) Shelby Cannon / (United States) Scott Melville, 6–2, 6–4
