= 1988 Eagle Classic =

- Date: October 3–9
- Edition: 3rd
- Category: Grand Prix (WCT)
- Draw: 32S / 16D
- Prize money: $297,500
- Surface: Hard / outdoor
- Location: Scottsdale, Arizona, U.S.

Champions

Singles
- (Sweden) Mikael Pernfors

Doubles
- (United States) Scott Davis / (United States) Tim Wilkison
| ← 1987 · | Eagle Classic | · 1989 → |

The 1988 Eagle Classic was a men's WCT and Nabisco Grand Prix tennis tournament played on outdoor hard courts in Scottsdale, Arizona in the United States. It was the third edition of the tournament and was held from October 3 through October 9, 1988. Third-seeded Mikael Pernfors won the singles title.

== Finals ==
=== Singles ===
(Sweden) Mikael Pernfors defeated (United States) Glenn Layendecker 6–2, 6–4

- It was Pernfors's 2nd singles title of the year and of his career.

=== Doubles ===
(United States) Scott Davis / (United States) Tim Wilkison defeated (United States) Rick Leach / (United States) Jim Pugh 6–3, 6–2

- It was Davis's only title of the year and the 9th of his career. It was Wilkison's 2nd title of the year and the 14th of his career.

== See also ==
- 1988 Virginia Slims of Arizona – women's tournament in Phoenix
