= 1991 Donnay Indoor Championships – Doubles =

Doubles
- 1991 Donnay Indoor Championships

Final
- Champions: (Australia) Todd Woodbridge (Australia) Mark Woodforde
- Runners-up: (Belgium) Libor Pimek (Netherlands) Michiel Schapers
- Score: 6–3, 6–0

Details
- Draw: 16
- Seeds: 4

Events
Singles	Doubles
← 1990 ·	Donnay Indoor Championships	· 1992 →

Emilio Sánchez and Slobodan Živojinović were the defending champions, but Sánchez did not participate this year. Živojinović partnered Boris Becker, withdrawing prior to their semifinals match.

Todd Woodbridge and Mark Woodforde won the title, defeating Libor Pimek and Michiel Schapers 6–3, 6–0 in the final.

== Seeds ==
1. (France) Guy Forget / (Switzerland) Jakob Hlasek (first round)
2. (United States) Patrick Galbraith / (United States) Todd Witsken (quarterfinals)
3. (Italy) Omar Camporese / (Spain) Javier Sánchez (first round)
4. (Australia) Todd Woodbridge / (Australia) Mark Woodforde (champions)

== Draw ==
=== Key ===
- Q = Qualifier
- WC = Wild card
- LL = Lucky loser
- Alt = Alternate
- SE = Special exempt
- PR = Protected ranking
- ITF = ITF entry
- JE = Junior exempt
- w/o = Walkover
- r = Retired
- d = Defaulted
- SR = Special ranking

=== Draw ===
First round
1	(France) G Forget (Switzerland) J Hlasek	3	6	3
(Belgium) L Pimek (Netherlands) M Schapers	6	3	6
Q	(Czechoslovakia) V Flégl (Czechoslovakia) D Vacek	6	7
(Iran) M Bahrami (Denmark) M Mortensen	2	6
3	(Italy) O Camporese (Spain) J Sánchez	4	2
(Germany) B Becker (Socialist Federal Republic of Yugoslavia) S Živojinović	6	6
(United States) C Beckman (United States) L Jensen	6	6
(Czechoslovakia) K Nováček (Czechoslovakia) T Šmíd	3	4
(Netherlands) HJ Davids (Netherlands) T Nijssen	6	6
LL	(Sweden) D Engel (Italy) S Pescosolido	7	7
WC	(Belgium) E Masso (Belgium) F Dewulf	6	2	6
4	(Australia) T Woodbridge (Australia) M Woodforde	3	6	7
(Spain) S Casal (Australia) P Cash	7	7
(United States) S DeVries (Australia) D Macpherson	6	6
(Mexico) L Lavalle (Mexico) J Lozano	4	6
2	(United States) P Galbraith (United States) T Witsken	6	7

Quarterfinals
(Belgium) L Pimek (Netherlands) M Schapers	7	6
Q	(Czechoslovakia) V Flégl (Czechoslovakia) D Vacek	6	3
(Germany) B Becker (Socialist Federal Republic of Yugoslavia) S Živojinović	6	6
(United States) C Beckman (United States) L Jensen	3	2
LL	(Sweden) D Engel (Italy) S Pescosolido	4	3
4	(Australia) T Woodbridge (Australia) M Woodforde	6	6
(Spain) S Casal (Australia) P Cash	6	7
2	(United States) P Galbraith (United States) T Witsken	2	5

Semifinals
(Belgium) L Pimek (Netherlands) M Schapers	w/o
(Germany) B Becker (Socialist Federal Republic of Yugoslavia) S Živojinović
4	(Australia) T Woodbridge (Australia) M Woodforde	7	3	6
(Spain) S Casal (Australia) P Cash	5	6	1

Final
(Belgium) L Pimek (Netherlands) M Schapers	3	0
4	(Australia) T Woodbridge (Australia) M Woodforde	6	6
