= 1990 Norstar Bank Hamlet Challenge Cup =

- Date: August 20–26
- Edition: 10th
- Category: World Series
- Draw: 28S / 14D
- Prize money: $225,000
- Surface: Hard / outdoor
- Location: Commack, NY, U.S.
- Venue: Hamlet Golf and Country Club

Champions

Singles
- (Sweden) Stefan Edberg

Doubles
- (France) Guy Forget / (Switzerland) Jakob Hlasek
← 1989 ·	Connecticut Open	· 1991 →

The 1990 Norstar Bank Hamlet Challenge Cup was a tennis tournament played on outdoor hard courts. It was the 10th edition of the event (the first as a professional tournament and not an exhibition) known that year as the Norstar Bank Hamlet Challenge Cup, and was part of the ATP World Series of the 1990 ATP Tour. It took place at the Hamlet Golf and Country Club in Commack, Long Island, New York, United States, from August 20 to August 26, 1990.

The singles field was headlined by new world No. 1, Australian Open runner-up, Wimbledon champion, Indian Wells and Cincinnati titlist Stefan Edberg, French Open champion, Barcelona and Madrid winner Andrés Gómez, and Rotterdam and Orlando titlist Brad Gilbert. Other seeded players were Philadelphia and Manchester winner Pete Sampras, Stuttgart titlist Goran Ivanišević, John McEnroe, Jonas Svensson and Guy Forget.

First-seeded Stefan Edberg won the singles title and earned $32,800 first-prize money.

== Finals ==
=== Singles ===
(Sweden) Stefan Edberg defeated (Socialist Federal Republic of Yugoslavia) Goran Ivanišević, 7–6^{(7–3)}, 6–3

- It was Edberg's sixth singles title of the year, and his 26th of his career.

=== Doubles ===
(France) Guy Forget / (Switzerland) Jakob Hlasek defeated (West Germany) Udo Riglewski / (Germany) Michael Stich, 2–6, 6–3, 6–4
