= 1993 Waldbaum's Hamlet Cup – Singles =

Singles
- 1993 Waldbaum's Hamlet Cup

Final
- Champion: (Switzerland) Marc Rosset
- Runner-up: (United States) Michael Chang
- Score: 6–4, 3–6, 6–1

Details
- Draw: 32
- Seeds: 8

Events
Singles	Doubles
← 1992 ·	Waldbaum's Hamlet Cup	· 1994 →

Petr Korda was the defending champion, but lost in the first round to Arnaud Boetsch.

Marc Rosset won in the final 6–4, 3–6, 6–1, against Michael Chang.

== Seeds ==
1. (Sweden) Stefan Edberg (semifinals)
2. (Germany) Boris Becker (first round)
3. (Spain) Sergi Bruguera (quarterfinals)
4. (Germany) Michael Stich (second round)
5. (United States) Michael Chang (final)
6. (Czech Republic) Petr Korda (first round)
7. (Croatia) Goran Ivanišević (semifinals)
8. (Russia) Alexander Volkov (quarterfinals)

== Draw ==
=== Key ===
- Q = Qualifier
- WC = Wild card
- LL = Lucky loser
- Alt = Alternate
- ITF = ITF entry
- PR = Protected ranking
- SR = Special ranking
- SE = Special exempt
- JE = Junior exempt
- JR = Junior Accelerator Programme entrant
- CO = College Accelerator Programme entrant
- NG = Next Gen Accelerator Program entrant
- w/o = Walkover
- r = Retired
- d = Defaulted

=== Finals ===
Semifinals
1	(Sweden) Stefan Edberg	1	2
5	(United States) Michael Chang	6	6
(Switzerland) Marc Rosset	6	6
7/WC	(Croatia) Goran Ivanišević	3	3

Final
5	(United States) Michael Chang	4	6	1
(Switzerland) Marc Rosset	6	3	6

=== Top half ===
First round
1	(Sweden) S Edberg	6	6
(United States) B Gilbert	3	0
Q	(Israel) E Ran	6	6
(Sweden) J Svensson	1	3
Q	(Russia) Y Kafelnikov	7	6
(Spain) T Carbonell	6^{2}	4
Q	(United States) R Weiss	4	4
8	(Russia) A Volkov	6	6
3	(Spain) S Bruguera	6	6
(United States) A O'Brien	2	3
WC	(United States) P McEnroe	6
(Spain) À Corretja	1	r
(Russia) A Cherkasov	6	6
(Italy) G Pozzi	2	1
Q	(Norway) C Ruud	7	3	5
5	(United States) M Chang	5	6	7

Second round
1	(Sweden) S Edberg	6	3	6
Q	(Israel) E Ran	3	6	3
Q	(Russia) Y Kafelnikov	6	4	3
8	(Russia) A Volkov	2	6	6
3	(Spain) S Bruguera	6	6
WC	(United States) P McEnroe	4	4
(Russia) A Cherkasov	6	3	2
5	(United States) M Chang	4	6	6

Quarterfinals
1	(Sweden) S Edberg	2	6	7
8	(Russia) A Volkov	6	4	6^{5}
3	(Spain) S Bruguera	6	1	2
5	(United States) M Chang	3	6	6

Semifinals
1	(Sweden) S Edberg	1	2
5	(United States) M Chang	6	6

=== Bottom half ===
First round
6	(Czech Republic) P Korda	2	2
(France) A Boetsch	6	6
(Switzerland) M Rosset	6	6
(Haiti) R Agénor	4	4
(Peru) J Yzaga	5	2
(France) C Pioline	7	6
(France) F Santoro	7	6^{9}	1
4	(Germany) M Stich	6^{6}	7	6
7/WC	(Croatia) G Ivanišević	7	6
(Germany) M-K Goellner	6^{7}	3
(Germany) C-U Steeb	6	7
(Germany) D Prinosil	4	5
(Netherlands) J Siemerink	7	4	6^{5}
(Brazil) L Mattar	6^{1}	6	7
(Russia) A Chesnokov	6	3	6
2/WC	(Germany) B Becker	4	6	2

Second round
(France) A Boetsch	6	4	2
(Switzerland) M Rosset	4	6	6
(France) C Pioline	6^{5}	6	7
4	(Germany) M Stich	7	4	6^{6}
7/WC	(Croatia) G Ivanišević	6	6
(Germany) C-U Steeb	2	1
(Brazil) L Mattar	6	6
(Russia) A Chesnokov	4	4

Quarterfinals
(Switzerland) M Rosset	6	6
(France) C Pioline	4	4
7/WC	(Croatia) G Ivanišević	6	6
(Brazil) L Mattar	4	2

Semifinals
(Switzerland) M Rosset	6	6
7/WC	(Croatia) G Ivanišević	3	3
