= 1994 Waldbaum's Hamlet Cup – Singles =

Singles
- 1994 Waldbaum's Hamlet Cup
- 1993 Champion: (Switzerland) Marc Rosset

Final
- Champion: (Russia) Yevgeny Kafelnikov
- Runner-up: (France) Cédric Pioline
- Score: 5–7, 6–1, 6–2

Details
- Draw: 32
- Seeds: 8

Events
Singles	Doubles
← 1993 ·	Waldbaum's Hamlet Cup	· 1995 →

Marc Rosset was the defending champion, but lost in the second round to Renzo Furlan.

Yevgeny Kafelnikov won in the final 5–7, 6–1, 6–2, against Cédric Pioline.

== Seeds ==
1. (Croatia) Goran Ivanišević (first round)
2. (Sweden) Stefan Edberg (second round)
3. (United States) Michael Chang (quarterfinals)
4. (United States) Todd Martin (quarterfinals)
5. (Russia) Yevgeny Kafelnikov (champion)
6. (France) Cédric Pioline (final)
7. (Switzerland) Marc Rosset (second round)
8. (France) Arnaud Boetsch (first round)

== Draw ==
=== Key ===
- Q = Qualifier
- WC = Wild card
- LL = Lucky loser
- Alt = Alternate
- SE = Special exempt
- PR = Protected ranking
- ITF = ITF entry
- JE = Junior exempt
- w/o = Walkover
- r = Retired
- d = Defaulted
- SR = Special ranking

=== Finals ===
Semifinals
(United States) Richey Reneberg	6	2	4
5	(Russia) Yevgeny Kafelnikov	4	6	6
6	(France) Cédric Pioline	4	7	6
(Italy) Renzo Furlan	6	6^{4}	0

Final
5	(Russia) Yevgeny Kafelnikov	5	6	6
6	(France) Cédric Pioline	7	1	2

=== Top half ===
First round
1	(Croatia) G Ivanišević	6^{2}	0	r
(United States) R Reneberg	7	3
Q	(United States) M Joyce	6	6
(United States) P McEnroe	4	2
Q	(France) L Roux	6	6
(France) O Delaître	3	1
(Czech Republic) K Nováček	6	7
8	(France) A Boetsch	4	6^{5}
3	(United States) M Chang	6	7
(Sweden) H Holm	0	6^{4}
(Haiti) R Agénor	6	4	4
Q	(Mexico) I Martínez	2	6	6
(Sweden) M Larsson	4	6	6^{5}
(Colombia) M Hadad	6	4	7
WC	(France) G Forget	3	4
5	(Russia) Y Kafelnikov	6	6

Second round
(United States) R Reneberg	6	7
Q	(United States) M Joyce	1	6^{4}
Q	(France) L Roux	6^{7}	7	6^{5}
(Czech Republic) K Nováček	7	5	7
3	(United States) M Chang	6	6
(Mexico) I Martínez	2	1
(Colombia) M Hadad	3	7	3
5	(Russia) Y Kafelnikov	6	6^{6}	6

Quarterfinals
(United States) R Reneberg	6	7
(Czech Republic) K Nováček	3	5
3	(United States) M Chang	6	6^{1}	4
5	(Russia) Y Kafelnikov	3	7	6

Semifinals
(United States) R Reneberg	6	2	4
5	(Russia) Y Kafelnikov	4	6	6

=== Bottom half ===
First round
6	(France) C Pioline	4	7	6
(Czech Republic) M Damm	6	5	3
(Peru) J Yzaga	7	6
WC	(United States) J Grabb	6^{7}	3
(Russia) A Volkov	3	7	6
(Czech Republic) D Vacek	6	5	1
(Czech Republic) D Rikl	3	4
4/WC	(United States) T Martin	6	6
7	(Switzerland) M Rosset	6^{5}	6	7
Q	(United States) R Weiss	7	3	6^{1}
(Italy) R Furlan	6	6
(Italy) S Pescosolido	4	1
(United States) M Washington	6	6
(Germany) H Dreekman	2	1
(United Kingdom) M Petchey	2	4
2	(Sweden) S Edberg	6	6

Second round
6	(France) C Pioline	6	6
(Peru) J Yzaga	1	3
(Russia) A Volkov	6	3	0
4/WC	(United States) T Martin	4	6	6
7	(Switzerland) M Rosset	6	4	2
(Italy) R Furlan	3	6	6
(United States) M Washington	6	3	6
2	(Sweden) S Edberg	0	6	3

Quarterfinals
6	(France) C Pioline	7	6
4/WC	(United States) T Martin	6^{3}	4
(Italy) R Furlan	6	6
(United States) M Washington	0	3

Semifinals
6	(France) C Pioline	4	7	6
(Italy) R Furlan	6	6^{4}	0
