= 1988 Eagle Classic – Doubles =

Tennis tournament

Doubles
- 1988 Eagle Classic

Final
- Champions: (United States) Scott Davis (United States) Tim Wilkison
- Runners-up: (United States) Rick Leach (United States) Jim Pugh
- Score: 6–4, 7–6

Details
- Draw: 16
- Seeds: 4

Events
Singles	Doubles
- Eagle Classic

Rick Leach and Jim Pugh were the defending champions.

Scott Davis and Tim Wilkison won the title, defeating Leach and Pugh 6–4, 7–6 in the final.

== Seeds ==
1. (Mexico) Jorge Lozano / (United States) Todd Witsken (first round)
2. (United States) Rick Leach / (United States) Jim Pugh (final)
3. (United States) Kevin Curren / (United States) David Pate (semifinals)
4. (United States) Jim Grabb / (United States) Patrick McEnroe (semifinals)

== Draw ==
Key

- Q = Qualifier
- WC = Wild card
- LL = Lucky loser
- Alt = Alternate
- ITF = ITF entry
- PR = Protected ranking
- SR = Special ranking
- SE = Special exempt
- JE = Junior exempt
- JR = Junior Accelerator Programme entrant
- CO = College Accelerator Programme entrant
- NG = Next Gen Accelerator Program entrant
- w/o = Walkover
- r = Retired
- d = Defaulted

=== Draw ===
First round
1	(Mexico) J Lozano (United States) T Witsken	4	1
(United States) S Davis (United States) T Wilkison	6	6
(Mexico) A Moreno (United States) L Scott	6	7	4
(United States) M Flur (United States) G Layendecker	7	5	6
4	(United States) J Grabb (United States) P McEnroe	6	6
(United States) B Gilbert (South Africa) C van Rensburg	3	3
(United States) A Kohlberg (United States) T Pawsat	3	7	7
WC	(United States) M Chang (United States) P Sampras	6	5	6
(United States) G Donnelly (United States) B Willenborg	6	6
(United States) E Korita (United States) J Levine	4	4
(South Africa) E Edwards (South Africa) G Muller	6	3	2
3	(United States) K Curren (United States) D Pate	3	6	6
(United States) M Anger (United States) G Holmes	6	6	3
(United States) D Goldie (Australia) M Woodforde	4	7	6
(South Africa) P Aldrich (South Africa) D Visser	4	6
2	(United States) R Leach (United States) J Pugh	6	7

Quarterfinals
(United States) S Davis (United States) T Wilkison	6	6
(United States) M Flur (United States) G Layendecker	0	3
4	(United States) J Grabb (United States) P McEnroe	6	5	7
(United States) A Kohlberg (United States) T Pawsat	2	7	6
(United States) G Donnelly (United States) B Willenborg	4	4
3	(United States) K Curren (United States) D Pate	6	6
(United States) D Goldie (Australia) M Woodforde	3	6	1
2	(United States) R Leach (United States) J Pugh	6	3	6

Semifinals
(United States) S Davis (United States) T Wilkison	6	7
4	(United States) J Grabb (United States) P McEnroe	3	5
3	(United States) K Curren (United States) D Pate	1	5
2	(United States) R Leach (United States) J Pugh	6	7

Final
(United States) S Davis (United States) T Wilkison	6	7
2	(United States) R Leach (United States) J Pugh	4	6
