= 1994 Waldbaum's Hamlet Cup – Doubles =

Doubles
- 1994 Waldbaum's Hamlet Cup

Final
- Champions: (France) Olivier Delaître (France) Guy Forget
- Runners-up: (Australia) Andrew Florent (United Kingdom) Mark Petchey
- Score: 6–4, 7–6

Events
Singles	Doubles
← 1993 ·	Waldbaum's Hamlet Cup	· 1995 →

Marc-Kevin Goellner and David Prinosil were the defending champions, but chose not to participate that year.

Olivier Delaître and Guy Forget won in the final 6–4, 7–6, against Andrew Florent and Mark Petchey.

== Seeds ==
1. (Czech Republic) Martin Damm / (Czech Republic) Cyril Suk (quarterfinals)
2. (Russia) Yevgeny Kafelnikov / (Czech Republic) David Rikl (first round)
3. (United States) Scott Melville / (United States) Brad Pearce (first round)
4. (United States) Shelby Cannon / (United States) Dave Randall (quarterfinals)

== Draw ==
=== Key ===
- Q = Qualifier
- WC = Wild card
- LL = Lucky loser
- Alt = Alternate
- SE = Special exempt
- PR = Protected ranking
- ITF = ITF entry
- JE = Junior exempt
- w/o = Walkover
- r = Retired
- d = Defaulted
- SR = Special ranking

=== Draw ===
First round
1	(Czech Republic) M Damm (Czech Republic) C Suk	7	6
LL	(Italy) R Furlan (Italy) S Pescosolido	6	3
(United States) L Jensen (United States) M Jensen	3	6	7
WC	(United States) P McEnroe (United States) J Schmitt	6	3	6
3	(United States) S Melville (United States) B Pearce	1	0	r
(United States) M Keil (Australia) A Malik	6	2
(Australia) A Florent (United Kingdom) M Petchey	2	6	7
(Netherlands) S Groen (United States) D Johnson	6	3	6
(Venezuela) M Ruah (Peru) J Yzaga	6	6
(South Africa) S Kruger (United States) G Van Emburgh	3	3
Q	(United States) T Ho (South Africa) C Marsh	4	4
4	(United States) S Cannon (United States) D Randall	6	6
WC	(United States) R Becker (United States) A Chirici	3	3
(Sweden) M Larsson (Czech Republic) K Nováček	6	6
(France) O Delaître (France) G Forget	7	6
(Russia) Y Kafelnikov (Czech Republic) D Rikl	6	3

Quarterfinals
1	(Czech Republic) M Damm (Czech Republic) C Suk	3	4
(United States) L Jensen (United States) M Jensen	6	6
(United States) M Keil (Australia) A Malik	3	3
(Australia) A Florent (United Kingdom) M Petchey	6	6
(Venezuela) M Ruah (Peru) J Yzaga	6	6	6
(United States) S Cannon (United States) D Randall	7	0	2
(Sweden) M Larsson (Czech Republic) K Nováček	6	3	4
(France) O Delaître (France) G Forget	3	6	6

Semifinals
(United States) L Jensen (United States) M Jensen	5	4
(Australia) A Florent (United Kingdom) M Petchey	7	6
(Venezuela) M Ruah (Peru) J Yzaga	3	3
(France) O Delaître (France) G Forget	6	6

Final
(Australia) A Florent (United Kingdom) M Petchey	4	6
(France) O Delaître (France) G Forget	6	7
