= 1992 ABN AMRO World Tennis Tournament – Singles =

Singles
- 1992 ABN AMRO World Tennis Tournament

Final
- Champion: (Germany) Boris Becker
- Runner-up: (Commonwealth of Independent States) Alexander Volkov
- Score: 7–6^{(11–9)}, 4–6, 6–2

Details
- Draw: 32
- Seeds: 8

Events
Singles	Doubles
- ABN AMRO World Tennis Tournament

Omar Camporese was the defending champion but lost in the first round to Jan Apell.

Boris Becker won in the final 7–6^{(11–9)}, 4–6, 6–2 against Alexander Volkov.

== Seeds ==
1. (Sweden) Stefan Edberg (second round)
2. (Germany) Boris Becker (champion)
3. (Czechoslovakia) Ivan Lendl (second round)
4. (Italy) Omar Camporese (first round)
5. (Croatia) Goran Prpić (quarterfinals)
6. (United States) John McEnroe (semifinals)
7. (Commonwealth of Independent States) Alexander Volkov (final)
8. (Sweden) Jonas Svensson (first round)

== Draw ==
Key

- Q = Qualifier
- WC = Wild card
- LL = Lucky loser
- Alt = Alternate
- ITF = ITF entry
- PR = Protected ranking
- SR = Special ranking
- SE = Special exempt
- JE = Junior exempt
- JR = Junior Accelerator Programme entrant
- CO = College Accelerator Programme entrant
- NG = Next Gen Accelerator Program entrant
- w/o = Walkover
- r = Retired
- d = Defaulted

=== Final ===
Final
7	(Commonwealth of Independent States) Alexander Volkov	6^{9}	6	2
2	(Germany) Boris Becker	7^{11}	4	6

=== Top half ===
First round
1	(Sweden) S Edberg	6	7
(Germany) P Baur	4	6^{7}
(Netherlands) J Siemerink	2	7	7
(Germany) C Saceanu	6	5	6^{3}
(Germany) L Koslowski	1	2
(United States) J Grabb	6	6
(Sweden) M Larsson	7	4	3
7	(Commonwealth of Independent States) A Volkov	6^{7}	6	6
3	(Czechoslovakia) I Lendl	6^{5}	6	6
(Sweden) J Gunnarsson	7	1	0
Q	(Germany) M-K Goellner	2	2
(Netherlands) P Haarhuis	6	6
WC	(Netherlands) T Nijssen	6	6
(Belgium) E Masso	3	1
WC	(Sweden) T Enqvist	5	3
5	(Croatia) G Prpić	7	6

Second round
1	(Sweden) S Edberg	6^{5}	2
(Netherlands) J Siemerink	7	6
(United States) J Grabb	3	3
7	(Commonwealth of Independent States) A Volkov	6	6
3	(Czechoslovakia) I Lendl	1	5
(Netherlands) P Haarhuis	6	7
WC	(Netherlands) T Nijssen	5	6^{8}
5	(Croatia) G Prpić	7	7

Quarterfinals
(Netherlands) J Siemerink	2	3
7	(Commonwealth of Independent States) A Volkov	6	6
(Netherlands) P Haarhuis	7	6
5	(Croatia) G Prpić	6^{5}	2

Semifinals
7	(Commonwealth of Independent States) A Volkov	6	6^{5}	6
(Netherlands) P Haarhuis	2	7	2

=== Bottom half ===
First round
5	(United States) J McEnroe	6	6
(Netherlands) M Koevermans	3	2
Q	(Germany) D Prinosil	6	7
(Spain) T Carbonell	4	5
Q	(Austria) A Antonitsch	6^{6}	7	6
(Netherlands) J Eltingh	7	6^{6}	4
Q	(Sweden) J Apell	6	6
4	(Italy) O Camporese	4	2
8	(Sweden) J Svensson	3	7	3
(Belgium) B Wuyts	6	5	6
WC	(France) H Leconte	6	r
(United States) P McEnroe	6
(Sweden) A Järryd	6	7
(Italy) D Nargiso	2	6^{5}
(Netherlands) M Schapers	3	1
2	(Germany) B Becker	6	6

Second round
6	(United States) J McEnroe	7	6
Q	(Germany) D Prinosil	6^{1}	3
Q	(Austria) A Antonitsch	6	6
(Sweden) J Apell	4	2
(Belgium) B Wuyts	5	0	r
(United States) P McEnroe	7	2
(Sweden) A Järryd	2	4
2	(Germany) B Becker	6	6

Quarterfinals
6	(United States) J McEnroe	2	6	7
(Austria) A Antonitsch	6	3	5
(United States) P McEnroe	3	5
2	(Germany) B Becker	6	7

Semifinals
6	(United States) J McEnroe	2	6^{1}
2	(Germany) B Becker	6	7
