= 1994 Waldbaum's Hamlet Cup =

- Date: August 22–28
- Edition: 14th
- Category: World Series
- Draw: 32S / 16D
- Prize money: $288,750
- Surface: Hard / outdoor
- Location: Commack, Long Island, NY, United States

Champions

Singles
- (Russia) Yevgeny Kafelnikov

Doubles
- (France) Olivier Delaître / (France) Guy Forget
- Waldbaum's Hamlet Cup

The 1994 Waldbaum's Hamlet Cup was a men's tennis tournament played on outdoor hard courts. It was the 14th edition of the event known that year as the Waldbaum's Hamlet Cup, and was part of the World Series of the 1994 ATP Tour. It took place at the Hamlet Golf and Country Club in Commack, Long Island, New York, United States, from August 22 through August 28, 1994.

The singles field was led by ATP No. 2, Wimbledon runner-up, Kitzbühel and Tokyo indoor winner Goran Ivanišević, Doha, Stuttgart indoor and Washington titlist Stefan Edberg, and Jakarta, Philadelphia, Hong Kong, Atlanta and Cincinnati champion Michael Chang. Also competing were Australian Open runner-up, Wimbledon semifinalist Todd Martin, Adelaide and Copenhagen titlist Yevgeny Kafelnikov, Cédric Pioline, Marc Rosset and Arnaud Boetsch.

Fifth-seeded Yevgeny Kafelnikov won the singles title.

== Finals ==
=== Singles ===
(Russia) Yevgeny Kafelnikov defeated (France) Cédric Pioline, 5–7, 6–1, 6–2

- It was Kafelnikov's 3rd singles title of the year and of his career.

=== Doubles ===
(France) Olivier Delaître / (France) Guy Forget defeated (Australia) Andrew Florent / (United Kingdom) Mark Petchey, 6–4, 7–6
