= 1992 Donnay Indoor Championships =

- Date: 10–16 February
- Edition: 11th
- Draw: 32S / 16D
- Prize money: $665,000
- Surface: Carpet / indoor
- Location: Brussels, Belgium
- Venue: Forest National

Champions

Singles
- (Germany) Boris Becker

Doubles
- (Germany) Boris Becker / (United States) John McEnroe
← 1991 ·	Donnay Indoor Championships

The 1992 Donnay Indoor Championships was a men's tennis tournament played on indoor carpet courts at the Forest National in Brussels, Belgium the event was part of the 1992 ATP Tour. It was the 11th and last edition of the tournament and was held from 10 February until 16 February 1992. Third-seeded Boris Becker won the singles title, his second at the event after 1990.

== Finals ==
=== Singles ===
(Germany) Boris Becker defeated (United States) Jim Courier, 6–7^{(5–7)}, 2–6, 7–6^{(12–10)}, 7–6^{(7–5)}, 7–5

- It was Becker's first singles title of the year, and the 32nd of his career.

=== Doubles ===
(Germany) Boris Becker / (United States) John McEnroe defeated (France) Guy Forget / (Switzerland) Jakob Hlasek, 6–3, 6–2
