= 1993 Qatar Open – Singles =

Singles
- 1993 Qatar Open

Final
- Champion: (Germany) Boris Becker
- Runner-up: (Croatia) Goran Ivanišević
- Score: 7–6^{(7–4)}, 4–6, 7–5

Details
- Draw: 32
- Seeds: 8

Events
Singles	Doubles
ATP Qatar Open	· 1994 →

Third-seeded Boris Becker defeated second-seeded Goran Ivanišević 7–6^{(7–4)}, 4–6, 7–5 to win the 1993 Qatar Mobil Open singles competition.

== Seeds ==
1. (Sweden) Stefan Edberg (semifinals)
2. (Croatia) Goran Ivanišević (final)
3. (Germany) Boris Becker (champion)
4. (Russia) Andrei Cherkasov (semifinals)
5. (Switzerland) Marc Rosset (first round, retired)
6. (Spain) Javier Sánchez (quarterfinals)
7. (Netherlands) Jan Siemerink (second round)
8. (Spain) Tomás Carbonell (first round)

== Draw ==
=== Key ===
- Q = Qualifier
- WC = Wild card
- LL = Lucky loser
- Alt = Alternate
- ITF = ITF entry
- PR = Protected ranking
- SR = Special ranking
- SE = Special exempt
- JE = Junior exempt
- JR = Junior Accelerator Programme entrant
- CO = College Accelerator Programme entrant
- NG = Next Gen Accelerator Program entrant
- w/o = Walkover
- r = Retired
- d = Defaulted

=== Finals ===
Semifinals
1	(Sweden) Stefan Edberg	4	4
3	(Germany) Boris Becker	6	6
4	(Russia) Andrei Cherkasov	2	2
2	(Croatia) Goran Ivanišević	6	6

Final
3	(Germany) Boris Becker	7^{7}	4	7
2	(Croatia) Goran Ivanišević	6^{4}	6	5

=== Section 1 ===
First round
1	(Sweden) S Edberg	6	7^{7}
(Germany) K Braasch	3	6^{5}
Q	(Russia) Y Kafelnikov	6	6
(United Kingdom) J Bates	3	3
(Italy) G Pozzi	6	7^{7}
(Italy) D Nargiso	4	6^{3}
(Austria) A Antonitsch	6	6^{1}	0
7	(Netherlands) J Siemerink	2	7^{7}	6
3	(Germany) B Becker	6^{2}	6	6
(South Africa) G Muller	7^{7}	2	0
(Czech Republic) M Damm	4	6	2
(France) S Simian	6	1	6
WC	(Russia) A Merinov	6	7
(France) T Champion	4	5
Q	(United States) M Jensen	2	4
6	(Spain) J Sánchez	6	6

Second round
1	(Sweden) S Edberg	6	6
Q	(Russia) Y Kafelnikov	3	4
(Italy) G Pozzi	7	5	7
7	(Netherlands) J Siemerink	5	7	5
3	(Germany) B Becker	7^{7}	6
(France) S Simian	6^{3}	2
WC	(Russia) A Merinov	6	5	0
6	(Spain) J Sánchez	4	7	6

Quarterfinals
1	(Sweden) S Edberg	6	6
(Italy) G Pozzi	0	0
3	(Germany) B Becker	6	6
6	(Spain) J Sánchez	4	3

Semifinals
1	(Sweden) S Edberg	4	4
3	(Germany) B Becker	6	6

=== Section 2 ===
First round
5	(Switzerland) M Rosset	7	6^{4}	0^{r}
(Spain) M Gorriz	5	7^{7}	2
WC	(India) V Amritraj	2	4
(Belgium) B Wuyts	6	6
(Germany) M Goellner	6^{6}	6	6^{5}
Q	(Morocco) Y El Aynaoui	7^{8}	4	7^{7}
(Austria) G Schaller	6	4	4
4	(Russia) A Cherkasov	4	6	6
8	(Spain) T Carbonell	6	4	1
(Germany) P Kühnen	2	6	6
(Netherlands) M Schapers	6	6
(Germany) M Zoecke	2	3
(Italy) C Pistolesi	3	2
WC	(Russia) A Olhovskiy	6	6
Q	(Netherlands) H Davids	2	4
2	(Croatia) G Ivanišević	6	6

Second round
(Spain) M Gorriz	6	6
(Belgium) B Wuyts	0	2
Q	(Morocco) Y El Aynaoui	3	7	4
4	(Russia) A Cherkasov	6	5	6
(Germany) P Kühnen	7	6
(Netherlands) M Schapers	5	2
(Russia) A Olhovskiy	3	6^{2}
2	(Croatia) G Ivanišević	6	7^{7}

Quarterfinals
(Spain) M Gorriz	1	5
4	(Russia) A Cherkasov	6	7
(Germany) P Kühnen	2	6^{2}
2	(Croatia) G Ivanišević	6	7^{7}

Semifinals
4	(Russia) A Cherkasov	2	2
2	(Croatia) G Ivanišević	6	6
