= 1994 Qatar Open – Singles =

Singles
- 1994 Qatar Open

Final
- Champion: (Sweden) Stefan Edberg
- Runner-up: (Netherlands) Paul Haarhuis
- Score: 6–3, 6–2

Details
- Draw: 32
- Seeds: 8

Events
Singles	Doubles
← 1993 ·	ATP Qatar Open	· 1995 →

Stefan Edberg defeated Paul Haarhuis 6–3, 6–2 to win the 1994 Qatar Open singles competition. Boris Becker was the defending champion.

== Seeds ==
1. (United States) Pete Sampras (first round)
2. (Germany) Michael Stich (second round)
3. (Sweden) Stefan Edberg (champion)
4. (Croatia) Goran Ivanišević (semifinals)
5. (Germany) Marc-Kevin Goellner (first round)
6. (Spain) Javier Sánchez (first round)
7. (Russia) Andrei Cherkasov (first round)
8. (Sweden) Magnus Larsson (first round)

== Draw ==
=== Key ===
- Q = Qualifier
- WC = Wild card
- LL = Lucky loser
- Alt = Alternate
- ITF = ITF entry
- PR = Protected ranking
- SR = Special ranking
- SE = Special exempt
- JE = Junior exempt
- JR = Junior Accelerator Programme entrant
- CO = College Accelerator Programme entrant
- NG = Next Gen Accelerator Program entrant
- w/o = Walkover
- r = Retired
- d = Defaulted

=== Finals ===
Semifinals
(Netherlands) Paul Haarhuis	6	6
4	(Croatia) Goran Ivanišević	2	4
3	(Sweden) Stefan Edberg	6	6^{5}	6
(Austria) Gilbert Schaller	4	7^{7}	4

Final
(Netherlands) Paul Haarhuis	3	2
3	(Sweden) Stefan Edberg	6	6

=== Section 1 ===
First round
1	(United States) P Sampras	6	2	4
Q	(Morocco) K Alami	3	6	6
(Spain) T Carbonell	6^{6}	6	1
(Netherlands) P Haarhuis	7^{8}	4	6
(Russia) A Olhovskiy	6	7
(Germany) D Prinosil	4	5
(Germany) C Steeb	7^{8}	5	6
8	(Sweden) M Larsson	6^{6}	7	2
4	(Croatia) G Ivanišević	6	0	6
WC	(Japan) S Matsuoka	4	6	4
(Morocco) Y El Aynaoui	3	6	6
(Sweden) J Björkman	6	3	3
Q	(Netherlands) F Wibier	6^{2}	2
(France) O Delaître	7^{7}	6
(Italy) S Pescosolido	6	6
6	(Spain) J Sánchez	4	2

Second round
Q	(Morocco) K Alami	4	7^{7}	3
(Netherlands) P Haarhuis	6	6^{5}	6
(Russia) A Olhovskiy	7	6
(Germany) C Steeb	5	2
4	(Croatia) G Ivanišević	7^{7}	6^{9}	6
(Morocco) Y El Aynaoui	6^{1}	7^{11}	2
(France) O Delaître	2	4
(Italy) S Pescosolido	6	6

Quarterfinals
(Netherlands) P Haarhuis	6	6
(Russia) A Olhovskiy	4	2
4	(Croatia) G Ivanišević	6	6
(Italy) S Pescosolido	4	4

Semifinals
(Netherlands) P Haarhuis	6	6
4	(Croatia) G Ivanišević	2	4

=== Section 2 ===
First round
5	(Germany) M Goellner	3	6^{3}
(Netherlands) J Eltingh	6	7^{7}
WC	(France) H Leconte	6	6
Q	(France) F Vitoux	3	2
(Sweden) A Järryd	6	7^{7}
(Sweden) H Holm	4	6^{5}
WC	(South Africa) G Muller	1	4
3	(Sweden) S Edberg	6	6
7	(Russia) A Cherkasov	1	6	4
(Germany) K Braasch	6	3	6
Q	(Germany) L Rehmann	6^{4}	1
(Austria) G Schaller	7^{7}	6
(Spain) J Burillo	2	4
(Haiti) R Agénor	6	6
(France) S Simian	2	1
2	(Germany) M Stich	6	6

Second round
(Netherlands) J Eltingh	3	1
WC	(France) H Leconte	6	6
(Sweden) A Järryd	1	1
3	(Sweden) S Edberg	6	6
(Germany) K Braasch	2	0^{r}
(Austria) G Schaller	6	1
(Haiti) R Agénor	5	6	6
2	(Germany) M Stich	7	4	4

Quarterfinals
WC	(France) H Leconte	4	2
3	(Sweden) S Edberg	6	6
(Austria) G Schaller	7^{7}	7^{8}
(Haiti) R Agénor	6^{3}	6^{6}

Semifinals
3	(Sweden) S Edberg	6	6^{5}	6
(Austria) G Schaller	4	7^{7}	4
