= 1990 Norstar Bank Hamlet Challenge Cup – Doubles =

Doubles
- 1990 Norstar Bank Hamlet Challenge Cup

Final
- Champions: (France) Guy Forget (Switzerland) Jakob Hlasek
- Runners-up: (West Germany) Udo Riglewski (Germany) Michael Stich
- Score: 2–6, 6–3, 6–4

Details
- Draw: 16
- Seeds: 4

Events
Singles	Doubles
← 1989 ·	Norstar Bank Hamlet Challenge Cup	· 1991 →

Guy Forget and Jakob Hlasek won in the final 2–6, 6–3, 6–4, against Udo Riglewski and Michael Stich.

== Seeds ==
1. (France) Guy Forget / (Switzerland) Jakob Hlasek (champions)
2. (West Germany) Udo Riglewski / (Germany) Michael Stich (final)
3. (United Kingdom) Neil Broad / (South Africa) Gary Muller (quarterfinals)
4. (Spain) Sergi Bruguera / (Socialist Federal Republic of Yugoslavia) Goran Ivanišević (quarterfinals)

== Draw ==
=== Key ===
- Q = Qualifier
- WC = Wild card
- LL = Lucky loser
- Alt = Alternate
- SE = Special exempt
- PR = Protected ranking
- ITF = ITF entry
- JE = Junior exempt
- w/o = Walkover
- r = Retired
- d = Defaulted
- SR = Special ranking

=== Draw ===
First round
1	(France) G Forget (Switzerland) J Hlasek	6	7
(Germany) B Becker (Germany) E Jelen	2	6
(United States) T Nelson (United States) B Shelton	6	6	7
(Australia) N Borwick (New Zealand) D Lewis	7	4	6
4	(Spain) S Bruguera (Socialist Federal Republic of Yugoslavia) G Ivanišević	5	7	6
(France) O Delaître (France) J-P Fleurian	7	6	3
(United States) J Brown (United States) S Melville	5	7	6
(Jamaica) D Burke (United States) R Schmidt	7	6	3
(Netherlands) P Haarhuis (Netherlands) M Schapers	6	4	7
(Sweden) J Carlsson (Sweden) J Svensson	3	6	6
(Australia) P Doohan (Australia) S Youl	4	4
3	(United Kingdom) N Broad (South Africa) G Muller	6	6
(United States) E Amend (United States) J Arias	6	6	6
(United States) L Jensen (United States) M Jensen	7	3	4
(Israel) G Bloom (Hungary) B Taróczy	4	6
2	(West Germany) U Riglewski (Germany) M Stich	6	7

Quarterfinals
1	(France) G Forget (Switzerland) J Hlasek	6	6
(United States) T Nelson (United States) B Shelton	4	4
4	(Spain) S Bruguera (Socialist Federal Republic of Yugoslavia) G Ivanišević	7	3	3
(United States) J Brown (United States) S Melville	6	6	6
(Netherlands) P Haarhuis (Netherlands) M Schapers	4	6	7
3	(United Kingdom) N Broad (South Africa) G Muller	6	3	6
(United States) E Amend (United States) J Arias	6	4
2	(West Germany) U Riglewski (Germany) M Stich	7	6

Semifinals
1	(France) G Forget (Switzerland) J Hlasek	6	2	7
(United States) J Brown (United States) S Melville	2	6	6
(Netherlands) P Haarhuis (Netherlands) M Schapers	4	4
2	(West Germany) U Riglewski (Germany) M Stich	6	6

Final
1	(France) G Forget (Switzerland) J Hlasek	2	6	6
2	(West Germany) U Riglewski (Germany) M Stich	6	3	4
