= 1994 Qatar Open – Doubles =

Doubles
- 1994 Qatar Open

Final
- Champions: (France) Olivier Delaître (France) Stéphane Simian
- Runners-up: (United States) Shelby Cannon (South Africa) Byron Talbot
- Score: 6–3, 6–3

Details
- Draw: 16
- Seeds: 4

Events
Singles	Doubles
← 1993 ·	ATP Qatar Open	· 1995 →

Boris Becker and Patrik Kühnen were the defending champions, but did not participate this year.

Olivier Delaître and Stéphane Simian won in the final 6–3, 6–3, against Shelby Cannon and Byron Talbot.

== Seeds ==
1. (Netherlands) Jacco Eltingh / (Netherlands) Paul Haarhuis (first round)
2. (United States) Luke Jensen / (United States) Murphy Jensen (first round)
3. (United States) Scott Melville / (South Africa) Gary Muller (first round)
4. (Sweden) Henrik Holm / (Sweden) Anders Järryd (quarterfinals)

== Draw ==
=== Key ===
- Q = Qualifier
- WC = Wild card
- LL = Lucky loser
- Alt = Alternate
- ITF = ITF entry
- PR = Protected ranking
- SR = Special ranking
- SE = Special exempt
- JE = Junior exempt
- JR = Junior Accelerator Programme entrant
- CO = College Accelerator Programme entrant
- NG = Next Gen Accelerator Program entrant
- w/o = Walkover
- r = Retired
- d = Defaulted

=== Draw ===
First round
1	(Netherlands) J Eltingh (Netherlands) P Haarhuis	3	2
(Germany) U Riglewski (Germany) M Stich	6	6
(Spain) J Sánchez (Germany) C-U Steeb	6	6
(South Africa) J de Beer (South Africa) J-L de Jager	4	3
3	(United States) S Melville (South Africa) G Muller	4	2
(Netherlands) S Groen (Germany) D Prinosil	6	6
(Sweden) J Björkman (Spain) T Carbonell	5	6	2
(United States) S Cannon (South Africa) B Talbot	7	1	6
Q	(France) O Delaître (France) S Simian	7	6
(Germany) M-K Goellner (Germany) C Saceanu	5	2
WC	(Sweden) S Edberg (United States) P Sampras	3	4
4	(Sweden) H Holm (Sweden) A Järryd	6	6
(Netherlands) M Oosting (Belgium) L Pimek	5	3
(Netherlands) HJ Davids (Russia) A Olhovskiy	7	6
WC	(Croatia) G Ivanišević (France) H Leconte	6	7
2	(United States) L Jensen (United States) M Jensen	3	6

Quarterfinals
(Germany) U Riglewski (Germany) M Stich	6	6	6
(Spain) J Sánchez (Germany) C-U Steeb	3	7	4
(Netherlands) S Groen (Germany) D Prinosil	6	6	2
(United States) S Cannon (South Africa) B Talbot	4	7	6
Q	(France) O Delaître (France) S Simian	7	2	6
4	(Sweden) H Holm (Sweden) A Järryd	6	6	3
(Netherlands) HJ Davids (Russia) A Olhovskiy	3	6	6
WC	(Croatia) G Ivanišević (France) H Leconte	6	4	7

Semifinals
(Germany) U Riglewski (Germany) M Stich	6	6	2
(United States) S Cannon (South Africa) B Talbot	7	4	6
Q	(France) O Delaître (France) S Simian	6	2	6
WC	(Croatia) G Ivanišević (France) H Leconte	4	6	4

Final
(United States) S Cannon (South Africa) B Talbot	3	3
Q	(France) O Delaître (France) S Simian	6	6
