= Edberg–Lendl rivalry =

Tennis rivalry between Stefan Edberg and Ivan Lendl

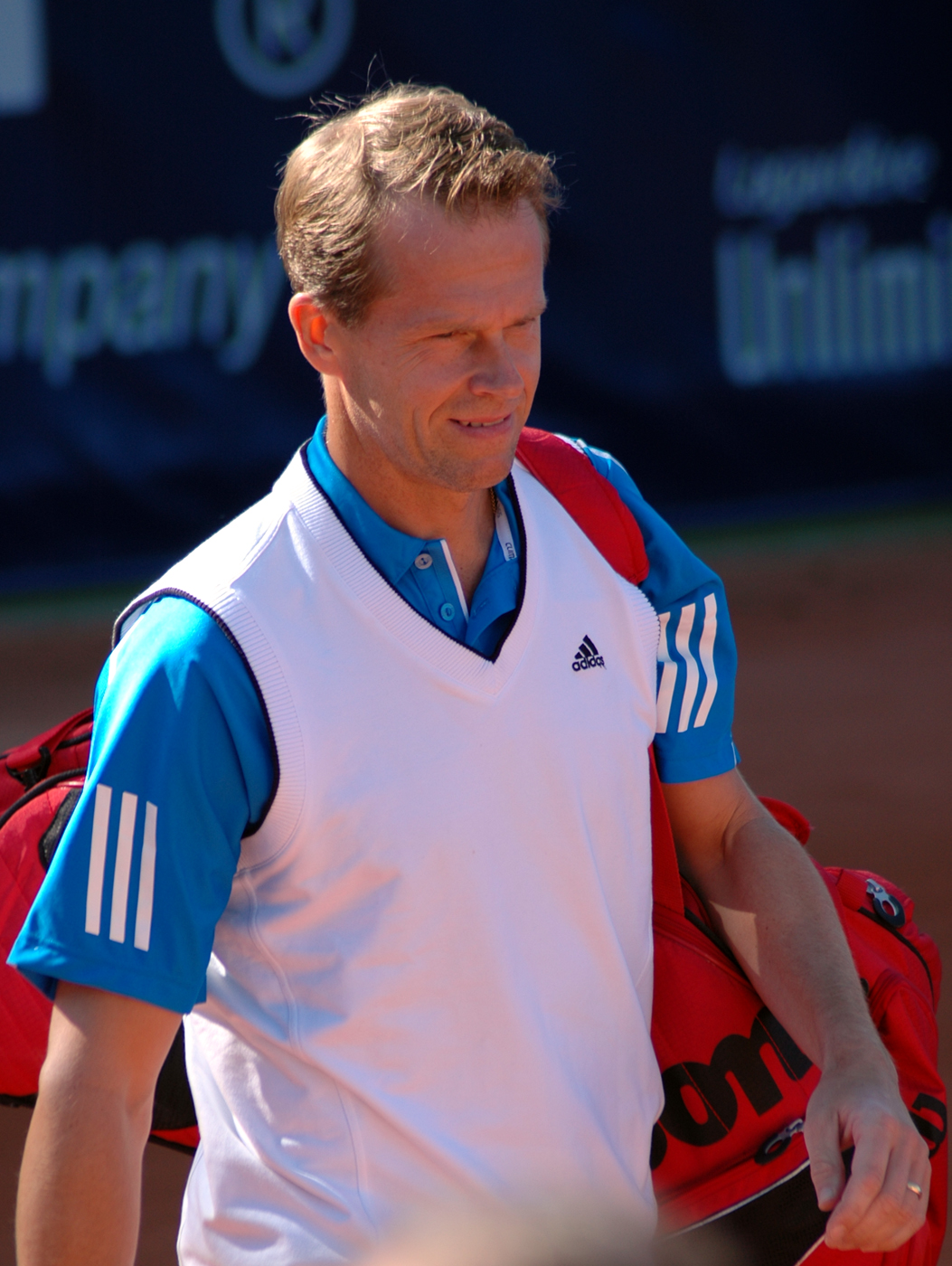
Stefan Edberg

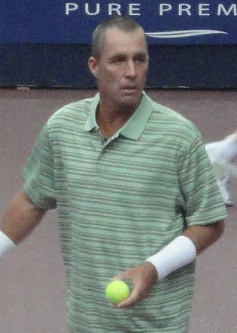
Ivan Lendl

The Edberg–Lendl rivalry was a tennis rivalry between Stefan Edberg and Ivan Lendl. They competed 27 times during their careers, between 1984 and 1992, and Edberg leads the head-to-head 14–13. In an interview with the ATP in 2008, Edberg reflected on his classic rivalries. Edberg led their five-set matches at 3–2.

== Head-to-head ==
Legend	Edberg	Lendl
Grand Slam	5	4
Masters Grand Prix	2	2
WCT Finals	0	1
ATP International Series	7	6
Total	14	13

=== Singles (27) ===
Edberg 14 – Lendl 13

No.	Year	Tournament	Surface	Round	Winner	Score	Edberg	Lendl
1.	1984	Rotterdam Open	Carpet	Semifinals	Lendl	6–3, 2–6, 7–6^{(7–4)}	0	1
2.	1985	Miami Open	Hard	Last 16	Edberg	6–4, 7–6^{(7–4)}	1	1
3.	1985	WCT Finals	Carpet	Quarterfinals	Lendl	3–6, 7–6^{(10–8)}, 3–6, 6–1, 6–2	1	2
4.	1985	Australian Open	Grass	Semifinals	Edberg	6–7^{(3–7)}, 7–5, 6–1, 4–6, 9–7	2	2
5.	1986	US Open	Hard	Semifinals	Lendl	7–6^{(8–6)}, 6–2, 6–3	2	3
6.	1986	Tokyo Indoor	Carpet	Semifinals	Edberg	7–5, 6–1	3	3
7.	1986	Masters Grand Prix	Carpet	Round Robin	Lendl	6–3, 6–4	3	4
8.	1987	Wimbledon	Grass	Semifinals	Lendl	3–6, 6–4, 7–6^{(10–8)}, 6–4	3	5
9.	1987	Canadian Open	Hard	Final	Lendl	6–4, 7–6^{(7–2)}	3	6
10.	1987	Tokyo Indoor	Carpet	Final	Edberg	6–7^{(4–7)}, 6–4, 6–4	4	6
11.	1988	Masters Grand Prix	Carpet	Semifinals	Lendl	6–3, 7–6^{(7–4)}	4	7
12.	1989	Eagle Classic	Hard	Final	Lendl	6–2, 6–3	4	8
13.	1989	Japan Open	Hard	Final	Edberg	6–3, 2–6, 6–4	5	8
14.	1989	Stockholm Open	Carpet	Semifinals	Lendl	6–0, 2–6, 6–3	5	9
15.	1989	Masters Grand Prix	Carpet	Semifinals	Edberg	7–6^{(7–5)}, 7–5	6	9
16.	1990	Australian Open	Hard	Final	Lendl	4–6, 7–6^{(7–3)}, 5–2 RET	6	10
17.	1990	Wimbledon	Grass	Semifinals	Edberg	6–1, 7–6^{(7–2)}, 6–3	7	10
18.	1990	Sydney Indoor	Hard (i)	Semifinals	Edberg	3–6, 7–6^{(7–4)}, 6–3	8	10
19.	1990	Tokyo Indoor	Carpet	Semifinals	Lendl	7–5, 6–3	8	11
20.	1990	ATP World Tour Championships	Carpet	Semifinals	Edberg	6–4, 6–2	9	11
21.	1991	Australian Open	Hard	Semifinals	Lendl	6–4, 5–7, 3–6, 7–6^{(7–3)}, 6–4	9	12
22.	1991	Japan Open	Hard	Final	Edberg	6–1, 7–5, 6–0	10	12
23.	1991	ATP Long Island	Hard	Final	Lendl	6–3, 6–2	10	13
24.	1991	US Open	Hard	Semifinals	Edberg	6–3, 6–3, 6–4	11	13
25.	1992	Australian Open	Hard	Quarterfinals	Edberg	4–6, 7–5, 6–1, 6–7^{(7–5)}, 6–1	12	13
26.	1992	Volvo International	Hard	Semifinals	Edberg	7–6^{(7–2)}, 4–6, 6–3	13	13
27.	1992	US Open	Hard	Quarterfinals	Edberg	6–3, 6–3, 3–6, 5–7, 7–6^{(7–3)}	14	13

== Famous matches ==
=== 1985 Australian Open semifinal ===
Ivan Lendl, No. 1 at the time, was upset by 19-year old and No. 6 Stefan Edberg in the semifinals of the 1985 Australian Open in an epic spread over two days and delayed multiple times by rain. Edberg won with a scoreline of 6–7^{(3–7)}, 7–5, 6–1, 4–6, 9–7, and as a result, Edberg reached his first Grand Slam final and would go onto win the final against fellow Swede Mats Wilander. Lendl had recently reclaimed the No. 1 ranking and had won his last 31 matches going into the match. Edberg led 2–1 in the first set before rain suspended the match until the next day, with only ten minutes of play. With no break opportunities in the first set, Lendl, the more experienced played, won it in a tiebreak, before Edberg leveled the match at one set apiece, before outclassing Lendl in the third and taking a two-sets to one lead. At 4–4 in the fourth set, rain sent the players back to the locker room for almost two hours, with them coming back and Lendl leveling the match. In the fifth set, both players held their serves until 8–7, when Edberg finally broke Lendl to seal the match. Unlike the modern Australian Open, the 1985 tournament was played on grass.

=== 1991 Australian Open semifinal ===
Two-time defending champion and No. 3 Lendl defeated No. 1 Edberg in the semifinals of the 1991 Australian Open. Lendl won with a scoreline of 6–4, 5–7, 3–6, 7–6^{(7–3)}, 6–4 and saved two match points, aiming to become the first man in the Open Era to win the Australian Open three consecutive times, but he would ultimately lose to Boris Becker in the final. Edberg squandered his two match points in the fourth set before Lendl came back to win the fourth in a tiebreak and the fifth set. This match was played on hardcourt unlike the semifinal years prior on grass.

=== 1992 Australian Open quarterfinal ===
No. 1 Edberg defeated No. 4 Lendl in an epic in the quarterfinals of the 1992 Australian Open, with a scoreline of 4–6, 7–5, 6–1, 6–7^{(5–7)}, 6–1. He would go onto reach the final, losing to Jim Courier.

=== 1992 US Open quarterfinal ===
In the final match of their rivalry, No. 2 Edberg would defeat No. 7 Lendl in an epic in the quarterfinals of the 1992 US Open, played over the course of two days. Edberg led 2–1 in the fifth set before play was suspended due to rain shortly after midnight and resumed the next day. He won with a scoreline of 6–3, 6–3, 3–6, 5–7, 7–6^{(7–3)}, and would go onto reach the final and win against Pete Sampras, with it being his sixth and last major title. Edberg won the title with a then record of 22 hours and 22 minutes of play.

== Head-to-head breakdown ==
- All matches: (27) Edberg 14–13
- All finals: Lendl 4–3
  - Grand Slam matches: Edberg 5–4
  - Grand Slam finals: Lendl 1–0
  - Non-Grand Slam finals: Tied 3–3
  - Tennis Masters Cup matches: Tied 2–2
  - Five-set matches: Edberg 3–2
