= 1991 Norstar Bank Hamlet Challenge Cup =

- Date: August 19–25
- Edition: 11th
- Category: World Series
- Draw: 32S / 16D
- Prize money: $225,000
- Surface: Hard / outdoor
- Location: Commack, NY, U.S.
- Venue: Hamlet Golf and Country Club
- Attendance: 43,233

Champions

Singles
- (Czechoslovakia) Ivan Lendl

Doubles
- (Germany) Eric Jelen / (Germany) Carl-Uwe Steeb
← 1990 ·	Connecticut Open	· 1992 →

The 1991 Norstar Bank Hamlet Challenge Cup was a men's tennis tournament played on outdoor hard courts. It was the 11th edition of the event known that year as the Norstar Bank Hamlet Challenge Cup, and was part of the World Series of the 1991 ATP Tour. It took place at the Hamlet Golf and Country Club in Commack, Long Island, New York, United States, from August 19 through August 25, 1991.

The singles featured ATP No. 2, Australian Open and Wimbledon semifinalist, Stuttgart, Tokyo indoor and Queen's Club winner, Long Island defending champion Stefan Edberg, Australian Open runner-up, Philadelphia and Memphis champion Ivan Lendl, and Wimbledon semifinalist, Miami finalist David Wheaton. Also present were Chicago titlist John McEnroe, Manchester winner Goran Ivanišević, Jonas Svensson, Alberto Mancini and Omar Camporese.

Second-seeded Ivan Lendl, who entered the draw on a wildcard, won the singles title and earned $32,400 first-prize money. It was his 5th win at the event, the first with the event as part of the ATP circuit.

== Finals ==
=== Singles ===
(Czechoslovakia) Ivan Lendl defeated (Sweden) Stefan Edberg, 6–3, 6–2

- It was Lendl's 3rd and final singles title of the year and the 91st of his career.

=== Doubles ===
(Germany) Eric Jelen / (Germany) Carl-Uwe Steeb defeated (United States) Doug Flach / (Italy) Diego Nargiso, 0–6, 6–4, 7–6

- It was Jelen's 1st doubles title of the year and the 4th of his career. It was Steeb's 1st doubles title of the year and the 2nd of his career.

== See also ==
- Edberg–Lendl rivalry
