= 1989 Eagle Classic – Singles =

Tennis tournament

Singles
- 1989 Eagle Classic

Final
- Champion: (Czechoslovakia) Ivan Lendl
- Runner-up: (Sweden) Stefan Edberg
- Score: 6–2, 6–3

Details
- Draw: 32
- Seeds: 8

Events
Singles	Doubles
← 1988 ·	Eagle Classic	· 1992 →

Mikael Pernfors was the defending champion but lost in the first round to Kevin Curren.

Ivan Lendl won in the final 6–2, 6–3, against Stefan Edberg.

== Seeds ==
1. (Czechoslovakia) Ivan Lendl (champion)
2. (Sweden) Stefan Edberg (final)
3. (United States) Jimmy Connors (first round)
4. (Austria) Thomas Muster (second round)
5. (Spain) Emilio Sánchez (semifinals)
6. (United States) Brad Gilbert (quarterfinals)
7. (Sweden) Mikael Pernfors (first round)
8. (Soviet Union) Andrei Chesnokov (second round)

== Draw ==
=== Key ===
- Q = Qualifier
- WC = Wild card
- LL = Lucky loser
- Alt = Alternate
- SE = Special exempt
- PR = Protected ranking
- ITF = ITF entry
- JE = Junior exempt
- w/o = Walkover
- r = Retired
- d = Defaulted
- SR = Special ranking

=== Finals ===
Semifinals
1	(Czechoslovakia) Ivan Lendl	6	3	6
5	(Spain) Emilio Sánchez	2	6	3
(Israel) Amos Mansdorf	7	4	1
2	(Sweden) Stefan Edberg	6	6	6

Final
1	(Czechoslovakia) Ivan Lendl	6	6
2	(Sweden) Stefan Edberg	2	3

=== Top half ===
First round
1	(Czechoslovakia) I Lendl	6	6
(United States) P Annacone	2	4
(Australia) W Masur	3	4
(South Africa) C van Rensburg	6	6
(United States) D Pate	6	3
WC	(Socialist Federal Republic of Yugoslavia) G Ivanišević	7	6
(Argentina) H de la Peña	4	4
8	(Soviet Union) A Chesnokov	6	6
WC/3	(United States) J Connors	4	6	4
(United States) J Kriek	6	4	6
(United States) J Courier	6	4	6
Q	(United States) J Pugh	4	6	3
(Australia) M Woodforde	6	1
SE	(United States) P Chamberlin	1	0^{r}
(India) R Krishnan	3	1
5	(Spain) E Sánchez	6	6

Second round
1	(Czechoslovakia) I Lendl	6	6
(South Africa) C van Rensburg	0	2
WC	(Socialist Federal Republic of Yugoslavia) G Ivanišević	4	6	6
8	(Soviet Union) A Chesnokov	6	3	3
(United States) J Kriek	1	1
(United States) J Courier	6	6
(Australia) M Woodforde	3	3
5	(Spain) E Sánchez	6	6

Quarterfinals
1	(Czechoslovakia) I Lendl	6	6
WC	(Socialist Federal Republic of Yugoslavia) G Ivanišević	4	4
(United States) J Courier	3	3
5	(Spain) E Sánchez	6	6

Semifinals
1	(Czechoslovakia) I Lendl	6	3	6
5	(Spain) E Sánchez	2	6	3

=== Bottom half ===
First round
6	(United States) B Gilbert	4	6	6
(United States) R Seguso	6	4	4
(United States) D Rostagno	5	2
Q	(United States) S Davis	7	6
(Israel) A Mansdorf	7	6
Q	(Czechoslovakia) M Vajda	6	2
(Brazil) L Mattar	3	2
4	(Austria) T Muster	6	6
7	(Sweden) M Pernfors	6	3	3
(United States) K Curren	3	6	6
WC	(United States) J Grabb	0	4
(United States) J Berger	6	6
Q	(United States) R Leach	5	4
(Austria) H Skoff	7	6
(United States) M Chang	2	4
2	(Sweden) S Edberg	6	6

Second round
6	(United States) B Gilbert	2	6	6
Q	(United States) S Davis	6	3	4
(Israel) A Mansdorf	7	6
4	(Austria) T Muster	5	2
(United States) K Curren	7	6
(United States) J Berger	6	3
(Austria) H Skoff	5	3
2	(Sweden) S Edberg	7	6

Quarterfinals
6	(United States) B Gilbert	7	3	0
(Israel) A Mansdorf	5	6	6
(United States) K Curren	3	6	6
2	(Sweden) S Edberg	6	3	7

Semifinals
(Israel) A Mansdorf	7	4	1
2	(Sweden) S Edberg	6	6	6
