= 1991 Donnay Indoor Championships =

- Date: 11–17 February
- Edition: 10th
- Category: Championship Series
- Draw: 32S / 16D
- Prize money: $465,000
- Surface: Carpet / indoor
- Location: Brussels, Belgium
- Venue: Forest National

Champions

Singles
- (France) Guy Forget

Doubles
- (Australia) Todd Woodbridge / (Australia) Mark Woodforde<
- Donnay Indoor Championships

The 1991 Donnay Indoor Championships was a men's tennis tournament played on indoor carpet courts at the Forest National in Brussels, Belgium which was part of the Championship Series category of the 1990 ATP Tour. It was the 10th edition of the tournament and was held from 11 February until 17 February 1991. Fourth-seeded Guy Forget won the singles title.

== Finals ==
=== Singles ===
(France) Guy Forget defeated (Soviet Union) Andrei Cherkasov, 6–3, 7–5, 3–6, 7–6

- It was Forget's 2nd singles title of the year and the 5th of his career.

=== Doubles ===
(Australia) Todd Woodbridge / (Australia) Mark Woodforde defeated (Belgium) Libor Pimek / (Netherlands) Michiel Schapers, 6–3, 6–0
