= 1994 Qatar Open =

- Date: 3–10 January
- Edition: 2nd
- Category: World Series
- Draw: 32S / 16D
- Prize money: $500,000
- Surface: Hard / outdoor
- Location: Doha, Qatar

Champions

Singles
- (Sweden) Stefan Edberg

Doubles
- (France) Olivier Delaître / (France) Stéphane Simian
- ATP Qatar Open

The 1994 Qatar Open, known as the 1994 Qatar Mobil Open for sponsorship reasons, was an ATP men's tennis tournament held in Doha, Qatar. It was the second edition of the tournament and was held from 3 January until 10 January 1994. Third-seeded Stefan Edberg won his first title of the year and the 38th of his career.

== Finals ==
=== Singles ===
(Sweden) Stefan Edberg defeated (Netherlands) Paul Haarhuis, 6–3, 6–2

=== Doubles ===
(France) Olivier Delaître / (France) Stéphane Simian defeated (United States) Shelby Cannon / (South Africa) Byron Talbot, 6–3, 6–3
