= 1991 U.S. Men's Clay Court Championships – Doubles =

Doubles
- 1991 U.S. Men's Clay Court Championships

Final
- Champions: (United States) Rick Leach (United States) Jim Pugh
- Runners-up: (United States) Bret Garnett (United States) Greg Van Emburgh
- Score: 6–3, 2–6, 6–3

Details
- Draw: 16
- Seeds: 4

Events
Singles	Doubles
← 1990 ·	U.S. Men's Clay Court Championships	· 1992 →

The defending champions were Scott Davis and David Pate, but they were defeated by Diego Nargiso and Stefano Pescosolido in the first round. Second-seeded pair Rick Leach and Jim Pugh won in the final against Bret Garnett and Greg Van Emburgh.

== Seeds ==
Champion seeds are indicated in bold text while text in italics indicates the round in which those seeds were eliminated.

1. (United States) Scott Davis / (United States) David Pate (first round)
2. (United States) **Rick Leach / (United States) Jim Pugh (champions)**
3. (United States) Ken Flach / (United States) Robert Seguso (semifinals)
4. (United States) Brian Garrow / (United States) Brad Pearce (quarterfinals)

== Draw ==
=== Key ===
- Q = Qualifier
- WC = Wild card
- LL = Lucky loser
- Alt = Alternate
- SE = Special exempt
- PR = Protected ranking
- ITF = ITF entry
- JE = Junior exempt
- w/o = Walkover
- r = Retired
- d = Defaulted
- SR = Special ranking

First round
1	(United States) Scott Davis (United States) David Pate	3	3
**(Italy) Diego Nargiso** **(Italy) S Pescosolido**	**6**	**6**
**(United States) Bret Garnett** **(United States) G Van Emburgh**	**6**	**6**
WC	(United States) Johan Kriek (West Germany) Christian Saceanu	1	4
4	**(United States) Brian Garrow** **(United States) Brad Pearce**	**6**	**6**
(United States) Kent Kinnear (United States) Sven Salumaa	3	2
**(United States) Jimmy Arias** **(United States) John Sobel**	4	**6**	**7**
(Argentina) Javier Frana (Uruguay) Diego Pérez	**6**	4	5
**(United States) Doug Flach** **(United States) Bryan Shelton**	**6**	**7**
(United States) Richey Reneberg (United States) Derrick Rostagno	1	6
(United States) Scott Patridge (United States) Kenny Thorne	3	4
3	**(United States) Ken Flach** **(United States) Robert Seguso**	**6**	**6**
**(New Zealand) Kelly Evernden** **(United States) Joey Rive**	**7**	**6**
(United States) Mark Keil (South Africa) Byron Talbot	6	4
Q	(United States) Todd Martin (United States) M Washington	4	2
2	**(United States) Rick Leach** **(United States) Jim Pugh**	**6**	**6**

Quarterfinals
(Italy) Diego Nargiso (Italy) S Pescosolido	w/o
**(United States) Bret Garnett** **(United States) G Van Emburgh**
4	(United States) Brian Garrow (United States) Brad Pearce	**6**	4	5
**(United States) Jimmy Arias** **(United States) John Sobel**	4	**6**	**7**
(United States) Doug Flach (United States) Bryan Shelton	4	6
3	**(United States) Ken Flach** **(United States) Robert Seguso**	**6**	**7**
(New Zealand) Kelly Evernden (United States) Joey Rive	6	6
2	**(United States) Rick Leach** **(United States) Jim Pugh**	**7**	**7**

Semifinals
**(United States) Bret Garnett** **(United States) G Van Emburgh**	**7**	**7**
(United States) Jimmy Arias (United States) John Sobel	6	6
3	(United States) Ken Flach (United States) Robert Seguso	6	6
2	**(United States) Rick Leach** **(United States) Jim Pugh**	**7**	**7**

Final
(United States) Bret Garnett (United States) Greg Van Emburgh	3	**6**	3
2	**(United States) Rick Leach** **(United States) Jim Pugh**	**6**	2	**6**
