= 1990 U.S. Men's Clay Court Championships – Doubles =

Doubles
- 1990 U.S. Men's Clay Court Championships

Final
- Champions: (United States) Scott Davis (United States) David Pate
- Runners-up: (United States) Jim Grabb (Mexico) Leonardo Lavalle
- Score: 6–2, 6–3

Details
- Draw: 16
- Seeds: 4

Events
Singles	Doubles
← 1989 ·	U.S. Men's Clay Court Championships	· 1991 →

Top-seeded pair Scott Davis and David Pate won in the final against second-seeds Jim Grabb and Leonardo Lavalle.

== Seeds ==
Champion seeds are indicated in bold text while text in italics indicates the round in which those seeds were eliminated.

1. (United States) **Scott Davis / (United States) David Pate (champions)**
2. (United States) Jim Grabb / (Mexico) Leonardo Lavalle (final)
3. (United States) Brad Pearce / (United States) Richey Reneberg (quarterfinals)
4. (Australia) Broderick Dyke / (United States) Tim Wilkison (quarterfinals)

== Draw ==
=== Key ===
- Q = Qualifier
- WC = Wild card
- LL = Lucky loser
- Alt = Alternate
- SE = Special exempt
- PR = Protected ranking
- ITF = ITF entry
- JE = Junior exempt
- w/o = Walkover
- r = Retired
- d = Defaulted
- SR = Special ranking

First round
1	**(United States) Scott Davis** **(United States) David Pate**	**6**	5	**6**
(South Africa) Royce Deppe (United States) Derrick Rostagno	1	**7**	1
**(United States) Eric Amend** **(United States) Jeff Tarango**	**6**	**6**
(Sweden) Ville Jansson (Sweden) Tobias Svantesson	4	3
4	**(Australia) Broderick Dyke** **(United States) Tim Wilkison**	3	**6**	**7**
(United States) Joey Rive (United States) Leif Shiras	**6**	4	6
**(United States) Sven Salumaa** **(United States) John Sobel**	**6**	**6**
(Mexico) Agustín Moreno (United States) Blaine Willenborg	3	2
**(West Germany) Alexander Mronz** **(United States) G Van Emburgh**	**6**	**6**
(United States) Shelby Cannon (United States) Bret Garnett	3	3
(United States) Dan Cassidy (United States) Bryan Shelton	**6**	5	6
3	**(United States) Brad Pearce** **(United States) Richey Reneberg**	1	**7**	**7**
**(Venezuela) Alfonso Mora** **(United States) Brian Page**	**6**	3	**6**
(United States) John Letts (United States) Robert Van't Hof	3	**6**	4
(United States) Tom Mercer (Mexico) F Pérez Pascal	4	3
2	**(United States) Jim Grabb** **(Mexico) Leonardo Lavalle**	**6**	**6**

Quarterfinals
1	**(United States) Scott Davis** **(United States) David Pate**	**6**	3	**6**
(United States) Eric Amend (United States) Jeff Tarango	3	**6**	2
4	(Australia) Broderick Dyke (United States) Tim Wilkison	5	**6**	5
**(United States) Sven Salumaa** **(United States) John Sobel**	**7**	3	**7**
**(West Germany) Alexander Mronz** **(United States) G Van Emburgh**	**6**	**6**
3	(United States) Brad Pearce (United States) Richey Reneberg	2	3
(Venezuela) Alfonso Mora (United States) Brian Page	5	**6**	6
2	**(United States) Jim Grabb** **(Mexico) Leonardo Lavalle**	**7**	3	**7**

Semifinals
1	**(United States) Scott Davis** **(United States) David Pate**	4	**7**	**6**
(United States) Sven Salumaa (United States) John Sobel	**6**	6	4
(West Germany) Alexander Mronz (United States) Greg Van Emburgh	4	**6**	3
2	**(United States) Jim Grabb** **(Mexico) Leonardo Lavalle**	**6**	3	**6**

Final
1	**(United States) Scott Davis** **(United States) David Pate**	**6**	**6**
2	(United States) Jim Grabb (Mexico) Leonardo Lavalle	2	3
