= 2004 U.S. Men's Clay Court Championships =

Men's tennis tournament

- Date: April 12–18
- Edition: 36th
- Category: International Series
- Draw: 32S / 16D
- Prize money: $355,000
- Surface: Clay / outdoor
- Location: Houston, Texas, U.S.
- Venue: Westside Tennis Club

Champions

Singles
- (Germany) Tommy Haas

Doubles
- (United States) James Blake / (United States) Mardy Fish
| ← 2003 · | U.S. Men's Clay Court Championships | · 2005 → |

The 2004 U.S. Men's Clay Court Championships was a tennis tournament played on outdoor clay courts at the Westside Tennis Club in Houston, Texas in the United States and was part of the International Series of the 2004 ATP Tour. It was the 36th edition of the tournament and was held from April 12 through April 18, 2004. Tommy Haas won the singles title.

== Finals ==
=== Singles ===
(Germany) Tommy Haas defeated (United States) Andy Roddick 6–3, 6–4

- It was Haas's 1st title of the year and the 6th of his career.

=== Doubles ===
(United States) James Blake / (United States) Mardy Fish defeated (United States) Rick Leach / (United States) Brian MacPhie 6–3, 6–4

- It was Blake's 2nd title of the year and the 5th of his career. It was Fish's 2nd title of the year and the 4th of his career.
