= 2005 U.S. Men's Clay Court Championships – Doubles =

Doubles
- 2005 U.S. Men's Clay Court Championships

Final
- Champions: (The Bahamas) Mark Knowles (Canada) Daniel Nestor
- Runners-up: (Argentina) Martín García (Peru) Luis Horna
- Score: 6–3, 6–4

Details
- Draw: 16
- Seeds: 4

Events
| Singles | Doubles |
- U.S. Men's Clay Court Championships

Mark Knowles and Daniel Nestor defeated Martín García and Luis Horna in the final, 6–3, 6–4 to win the doubles tennis title at the 2005 U.S. Men's Clay Court Championships.

James Blake and Mardy Fish were the defending champions, but they lost in the first round.

== Seeds ==
1. (The Bahamas) Mark Knowles / (Canada) Daniel Nestor (champions)
2. ~~(United States) Bob Bryan / (United States) Mike Bryan~~ (withdrew)
3. (Australia) Jordan Kerr / (United States) Graydon Oliver (first round)
4. (United States) Rick Leach / (United States) Travis Parrott (first round)

== Draw ==
Key

- Q = Qualifier
- WC = Wild card
- LL = Lucky loser
- Alt = Alternate
- ITF = ITF entry
- PR = Protected ranking
- SR = Special ranking
- SE = Special exempt
- JE = Junior exempt
- JR = Junior Accelerator Programme entrant
- CO = College Accelerator Programme entrant
- NG = Next Gen Accelerator Program entrant
- w/o = Walkover
- r = Retired
- d = Defaulted

=== Draw ===
First round
1 | (The Bahamas) M Knowles (Canada) D Nestor | 4 | 6 | 6
Alt | (Spain) Á Calatrava (Brazil) R Mello | 6 | 3 | 2
(France) S Grosjean (Russia) D Tursunov | 6 | 6
(United States) K Kim (Czech Republic) T Zíb | 3 | 0
3 | (Australia) J Kerr (United States) G Oliver | 6^{15} | 4
(South Africa) R Koenig (United States) B MacPhie | 7^{17} | 6
(Australia) A Fisher (South Africa) C Haggard | 0 | 6 | 6
(Spain) Ó Hernández (Chile) N Massú | 6 | 4 | 3
(United States) J Blake (United States) M Fish | 4 | 4
WC | (United States) T Davis (United States) A Roddick | 6 | 6
(Czech Republic) T Cibulec (Poland) M Fyrstenberg | 6 | 6
4 | (United States) R Leach (United States) T Parrott | 4 | 4
WC | (United States) A Agassi (United States) J Courier | 2 | 6 | 1
(Argentina) M García (Peru) L Horna | 6 | 3 | 6
(Austria) J Knowle (Austria) J Melzer | 6 | 3 | 6
Alt | (South Africa) J Coetzee (United States) T Phillips | 3 | 6 | 4

Quarterfinals
1 | (The Bahamas) M Knowles (Canada) D Nestor | 6 | 6
(France) S Grosjean (Russia) D Tursunov | 3 | 2
(South Africa) R Koenig (United States) B MacPhie | 4 | 6^{6}
(Australia) A Fisher (South Africa) C Haggard | 6 | 7^{8}
WC | (United States) T Davis (United States) A Roddick | 3 | 2
(Czech Republic) T Cibulec (Poland) M Fyrstenberg | 6 | 6
(Argentina) M García (Peru) L Horna | 6 | 6
(Austria) J Knowle (Austria) J Melzer | 2 | 3

Semifinals
1 | (The Bahamas) M Knowles (Canada) D Nestor | 6 | 6
(Australia) A Fisher (South Africa) C Haggard | 3 | 1
(Czech Republic) T Cibulec (Poland) M Fyrstenberg | 2 | 6^{1}
(Argentina) M García (Peru) L Horna | 6 | 7^{7}

Final
1 | (The Bahamas) M Knowles (Canada) D Nestor | 6 | 6
(Argentina) M García (Peru) L Horna | 3 | 4
