= 1993 U.S. Men's Clay Court Championships – Singles =

Singles
- 1993 U.S. Men's Clay Court Championships

Final
- Champion: (Argentina) Horacio de la Peña
- Runner-up: (Peru) Jaime Yzaga
- Score: 3–6, 6–3, 6–4

Details
- Draw: 32
- Seeds: 8

Events
Singles	Doubles
- U.S. Men's Clay Court Championships

MaliVai Washington was the defending champion, but lost in the first round this year.

Horacio de la Peña won the title, defeating Jaime Yzaga 3–6, 6–3, 6–4 in the final.

== Seeds ==
A champion seed is indicated in bold text while text in italics indicates the round in which that seed was eliminated.

1. (United States) MaliVai Washington (first round)
2. (United States) Todd Martin (semifinals)
3. (Peru) Jaime Yzaga (final)
4. (United States) Jeff Tarango (first round)
5. (Austria) Horst Skoff (first round)
6. (United States) Derrick Rostagno (quarterfinals)
7. (Netherlands) Jacco Eltingh (quarterfinals)
8. (Austria) Gilbert Schaller (second round)

== Draw ==
Key

- Q = Qualifier
- WC = Wild card
- LL = Lucky loser
- Alt = Alternate
- ITF = ITF entry
- PR = Protected ranking
- SR = Special ranking
- SE = Special exempt
- JE = Junior exempt
- JR = Junior Accelerator Programme entrant
- CO = College Accelerator Programme entrant
- NG = Next Gen Accelerator Program entrant
- w/o = Walkover
- r = Retired
- d = Defaulted

First round
1	(United States) M Washington	**6**	3	3
WC	(United States) **D Witt**	2	**6**	**6**
(Switzerland) **C Mezzadri**	**6**	**7**
WC	(Ecuador) A Gómez	3	5
Q	(United States) **M Joyce**	**6**	**6**
WC	(United States) T Wilkison	1	4
(Argentina) R Azar	3	2
7	(Netherlands) **J Eltingh**	**6**	**6**
4	(United States) J Tarango	6^{5}	1
(Argentina) **H de la Peña**	**7^{7}**	**6**
(Argentina) **J Frana**	**6**	**6**
Q	(Czechoslovakia) L Němeček	4	3
(Uruguay) D Pérez	2	2
Q	(United States) **J Arias**	**6**	**6**
(Mexico) L Lavalle	1	5
6	(United States) **D Rostagno**	**6**	**7**
5	(Austria) H Skoff	3	4
(United States) **B Shelton**	**6**	**6**
(Haiti) **R Agénor**	**6**	**6**
(Germany) C Saceanu	3	4
(Spain) M A Górriz	3	4
(Venezuela) **N Pereira**	**6**	**6**
(Chile) S Cortés	2	2
3	(Peru) **J Yzaga**	**6**	**6**
8	(Austria) **G Schaller**	**6**	**6**
(United States) T Witsken	4	0
(Czechoslovakia) M Střelba	5	0
Q	(Sweden) **M Pernfors**	**7**	**6**
(Portugal) **J Cunha Silva**	2	**6**	**6**
(France) T Champion	**6**	3	0
(Czechoslovakia) S Doseděl	3	2
2	(United States) **T Martin**	**6**	**6**

Second round
WC	(United States) D Witt	2	4
(Switzerland) **C Mezzadri**	**6**	**6**
Q	(United States) M Joyce	4	3
7	(Netherlands) **J Eltingh**	**6**	**6**
(Argentina) **H de la Peña**	**6**	**6**
(Argentina) J Frana	3	3
Q	(United States) J Arias	**7^{7}**	4	3
6	(United States) **D Rostagno**	6^{5}	**6**	**6**
(United States) **B Shelton**	**6**	6^{6}	**7^{7}**
(Haiti) R Agénor	4	**7^{8}**	6^{5}
(Venezuela) N Pereira	1	2
3	(Peru) **J Yzaga**	**6**	**6**
8	(Austria) G Schaller	**6**	4	1
Q	(Sweden) **M Pernfors**	4	**6**	**6**
(Portugal) J Cunha Silva	3	**6**	5
2	(United States) **T Martin**	**6**	3	**7**

Quarterfinals
(Switzerland) **C Mezzadri**	**6**	**6**
7	(Netherlands) J Eltingh	4	4
(Argentina) **H de la Peña**	**6**	**6**
6	(United States) D Rostagno	2	3
(United States) B Shelton	4	4
3	(Peru) **J Yzaga**	**6**	**6**
Q	(Sweden) M Pernfors	4	5
2	(United States) **T Martin**	**6**	**7**

Semifinals
(Switzerland) C Mezzadri	6^{12}	5
(Argentina) **H de la Peña**	**7^{14}**	**7**
3	(Peru) **J Yzaga**	**6**	2	**6**
2	(United States) T Martin	2	**6**	2

Final
(Argentina) **Horacio de la Peña**	3	**6**	**6**
3	(Peru) Jaime Yzaga	**6**	3	4
