= 2004 U.S. Men's Clay Court Championships – Doubles =

Doubles
- 2004 U.S. Men's Clay Court Championships

Final
- Champions: (United States) James Blake (United States) Mardy Fish
- Runners-up: (United States) Rick Leach (United States) Brian MacPhie
- Score: 6–3, 6–4

Details
- Draw: 16
- Seeds: 4

Events
Singles	Doubles
- U.S. Men's Clay Court Championships

Mark Knowles and Daniel Nestor were the defending champions but lost in the semifinals to James Blake and Mardy Fish.

Blake and Fish won in the final 6–3, 6–4 against Rick Leach and Brian MacPhie.

== Seeds ==
Champion seeds are indicated in bold text while text in italics indicates the round in which those seeds were eliminated.

1. (United States) Bob Bryan / (United States) Mike Bryan (first round)
2. (The Bahamas) Mark Knowles / (Canada) Daniel Nestor (semifinals)
3. (United States) Rick Leach / (United States) Brian MacPhie (final)
4. (Australia) Jordan Kerr / (Belgium) Tom Vanhoudt (first round)

== Draw ==
Key

- Q = Qualifier
- WC = Wild card
- LL = Lucky loser
- Alt = Alternate
- ITF = ITF entry
- PR = Protected ranking
- SR = Special ranking
- SE = Special exempt
- JE = Junior exempt
- JR = Junior Accelerator Programme entrant
- CO = College Accelerator Programme entrant
- NG = Next Gen Accelerator Program entrant
- w/o = Walkover
- r = Retired
- d = Defaulted

First round
1	(United States) B Bryan (United States) M Bryan	6^{7}	**6**	5
(Argentina) **J Acasuso** (Croatia) **I Karlović**	**7^{9}**	4	**7**
(Austria) J Melzer (Austria) A Peya	2	3
(Argentina) **M García** (Peru) **L Horna**	**6**	**6**
3	(United States) **R Leach** (United States) **B MacPhie**	**6**	**6**
WC	(United States) T Blake (United States) J Morrison	4	4
(United States) **T Martin** (United States) **J Thomas**	**7^{7}**	**6**
(Australia) T Perry (Japan) T Shimada	6^{4}	4
(United States) A Bogomolov Jr. (United States) T Dent	4	**7^{7}**	2
(United States) **R Ginepri** (The Bahamas) **M Merklein**	**6**	6^{5}	**6**
(United States) **J Blake** (United States) **M Fish**	**6**	**7^{7}**
4	(Australia) J Kerr (Belgium) T Vanhoudt	3	6^{5}
(United States) D Bowen (Australia) A Fisher	1	1
WC	(United States) **D Ayala** (United States) **R Kendrick**	**6**	**6**
(Sweden) S Aspelin (Sweden) J Landsberg	**7^{7}**	4	2
2	(The Bahamas) **M Knowles** (Canada) **D Nestor**	6^{4}	**6**	**6**

Quarterfinals
(Argentina) J Acasuso (Croatia) I Karlović	6^{8}	6^{6}
(Argentina) **M García** (Peru) **L Horna**	**7^{10}**	**7^{8}**
3	(United States) **R Leach** (United States) **B MacPhie**	**6**	**6**
(United States) T Martin (United States) J Thomas	1	1
(United States) R Ginepri (The Bahamas) M Merklein	3	2
(United States) **J Blake** (United States) **M Fish**	**6**	**6**
WC	(United States) D Ayala (United States) R Kendrick	2	4
2	(The Bahamas) **M Knowles** (Canada) **D Nestor**	**6**	**6**

Semifinals
(Argentina) M García (Peru) L Horna	3	4
3	(United States) **R Leach** (United States) **B MacPhie**	**6**	**6**
(United States) **J Blake** (United States) **M Fish**	4	**6**	**7^{7}**
2	(The Bahamas) M Knowles (Canada) D Nestor	**6**	4	6^{2}

Final
3	(United States) R Leach (United States) B MacPhie	3	4
(United States) **J Blake** (United States) **M Fish**	**6**	**6**
