= 2005 U.S. Men's Clay Court Championships – Singles =

Singles
- 2005 U.S. Men's Clay Court Championships

Final
- Champion: (United States) Andy Roddick
- Runner-up: (France) Sébastien Grosjean
- Score: 6–2, 6–2

Details
- Draw: 32
- Seeds: 8

Events
Singles	Doubles
- U.S. Men's Clay Court Championships

The 2005 U.S. Men's Clay Court Championships – Singles was an event of the 2005 U.S. Men's Clay Court Championships professional tennis tournament played on outdoor clay courts in Houston, Texas in the United States and was part of the International Series of the 2005 ATP Tour. The tournament was held from April 18 through April 25, 2006. The singles draw comprised 32 players and eight of them were seeded. Third-seeded Tommy Haas was the defending champion but lost in the quarterfinals to Jürgen Melzer. First-seeded Andy Roddick won the singles title after a 6–2, 6–2 win in the final against sixth-seeded Sébastien Grosjean.

== Seeds ==
A champion seed is indicated in bold text while text in italics indicates the round in which that seed was eliminated.

1. (United States) **Andy Roddick (champion)**
2. (United States) Andre Agassi (quarterfinals)
3. (Germany) Tommy Haas (quarterfinals)
4. (Chile) Nicolás Massú (first round)
5. (United States) ~~Taylor Dent~~ (withdrew because of an ankle injury)
6. (France) Sébastien Grosjean (final)
7. (Austria) Jürgen Melzer (semifinals)
8. (Peru) Luis Horna (quarterfinals)

== Draw ==
Key

- Q = Qualifier
- WC = Wild card
- LL = Lucky loser
- Alt = Alternate
- ITF = ITF entry
- PR = Protected ranking
- SR = Special ranking
- SE = Special exempt
- JE = Junior exempt
- JR = Junior Accelerator Programme entrant
- CO = College Accelerator Programme entrant
- NG = Next Gen Accelerator Program entrant
- w/o = Walkover
- r = Retired
- d = Defaulted

First round
1	(United States) **A Roddick**	**6**	**6**
Q	(United States) M Boeker	2	3
(United States) M Fish	1	4
(United States) **R Ginepri**	**6**	**6**
LL	(United States) **P Goldstein**	**6**	**7^{7}**
(Czech Republic) J Vaněk	1	6^{4}
(Sweden) T Enqvist	4	3
8	(Peru) **L Horna**	**6**	**6**
3	(Germany) **T Haas**	**6**	**7**
(Belgium) K Vliegen	3	5
(Germany) A Popp	3	6^{4}
(United States) **J Morrison**	**6**	**7^{7}**
Q	(Israel) **N Okun**	**6**	**7**
(Brazil) R Mello	4	5
(Argentina) M Puerta	3	3
7	(Austria) **J Melzer**	**6**	**6**
LL	(Chile) A García	4	4
(United States) **K Kim**	**6**	**6**
Q	(Ecuador) **N Lapentti**	**6**	**6**
(Czech Republic) T Zíb	3	2
(Czech Republic) I Minář	2	5
WC	(United States) **J Blake**	**6**	**7**
(France) **A Dupuis**	**6**	**6**
4	(Chile) N Massú	4	0
6	(France) **S Grosjean**	4	**6**	**7**
(Germany) B Phau	**6**	3	5
(Spain) **Ó Hernández**	**6**	**7**
Q	(United States) A Bogomolov Jr.	1	5
(Spain) **Á Calatrava**	**6**	**6**
WC	(United States) D Young	1	4
(Czech Republic) M Tabara	2	6^{5}
WC/2	(United States) **A Agassi**	**6**	**7^{7}**

Second round
1	(United States) **A Roddick**	**7^{8}**	**6**
(United States) R Ginepri	6^{6}	4
LL	(United States) P Goldstein	1	**7^{9}**	5
8	(Peru) **L Horna**	**6**	6^{7}	**7**
3	(Germany) **T Haas**	**7^{7}**	**6**
(United States) J Morrison	6^{4}	2
Q	(Israel) N Okun	**6**	2	5
7	(Austria) **J Melzer**	2	**6**	**7**
(United States) K Kim	6^{1}	2
Q	(Ecuador) **N Lapentti**	**7^{7}**	**6**
WC	(United States) **J Blake**	**6**	**6**
(France) A Dupuis	4	1
6	(France) **S Grosjean**	**6**	5	**6**
(Spain) Ó Hernández	4	**7**	2
(Spain) Á Calatrava	**6**	4	5
WC/2	(United States) **A Agassi**	3	**6**	**7**

Quarterfinals
1	(United States) **A Roddick**	**6**	**6**
8	(Peru) L Horna	4	1
3	(Germany) T Haas	**6**	2	4
7	(Austria) **J Melzer**	2	**6**	**6**
Q	(Ecuador) **N Lapentti**	**6**	1	**7^{7}**
WC	(United States) J Blake	4	**6**	6^{3}
6	(France) **S Grosjean**	4	**6**	**6**
WC/2	(United States) A Agassi	**6**	1	2

Semifinals
1	(United States) **A Roddick**	**6**	**6**
7	(Austria) J Melzer	1	2
Q	(Ecuador) N Lapentti	1	6^{5}
6	(France) **S Grosjean**	**6**	**7^{7}**

Final
1	(United States) **Andy Roddick**	**6**	**6**
6	(France) S Grosjean	2	2
