= 1991 U.S. Men's Clay Court Championships – Singles =

Singles
- 1991 U.S. Men's Clay Court Championships

Final
- Champion: (Peru) Jaime Yzaga
- Runner-up: (United States) Jimmy Arias
- Score: 6–3, 7–5

Details
- Draw: 32
- Seeds: 8

Events
Singles	Doubles
- U.S. Men's Clay Court Championships

David Wheaton was the defending champion, but lost in the quarterfinals this year.

Jaime Yzaga won the title, defeating Jimmy Arias 6–3, 7–5 in the final.

== Seeds ==
A champion seed is indicated in bold text while text in italics indicates the round in which that seed was eliminated.

1. (United States) Michael Chang (quarterfinals)
2. (United States) Derrick Rostagno (first round)
3. (United States) David Wheaton (quarterfinals)
4. (United States) Richey Reneberg (quarterfinals)
5. (United States) Jimmy Arias (final)
6. (United States) Scott Davis (first round)
7. (Peru) **Jaime Yzaga (champion)**
8. (United States) David Pate (first round)

== Draw ==
Key

- Q = Qualifier
- WC = Wild card
- LL = Lucky loser
- Alt = Alternate
- ITF = ITF entry
- PR = Protected ranking
- SR = Special ranking
- SE = Special exempt
- JE = Junior exempt
- JR = Junior Accelerator Programme entrant
- CO = College Accelerator Programme entrant
- NG = Next Gen Accelerator Program entrant
- w/o = Walkover
- r = Retired
- d = Defaulted

First round
1	(United States) **M Chang**	**6**	**7**
(Sweden) N Kroon	0	5
(United States) **B Shelton**	**6**	**6**
(Italy) S Pescosolido	2	2
(Canada) A Sznajder	1	**6**	4
Q	(United States) **J Brown**	**6**	3	**6**
(United States) C Garner	6^{6}	3
7	(Peru) **J Yzaga**	**7^{8}**	**6**
3	(United States) **D Wheaton**	**6**	**6**
(United States) C Adams	4	3
WC	(United States) J Pugh	1	3
(Czechoslovakia) **P Korda**	**6**	**6**
WC	(United States) R Leach	1	6^{4}
(United States) **M Washington**	**6**	**7^{7}**
(Germany) **C Saceanu**	**6**	3	**6**
6	(United States) S Davis	1	**6**	0
5	(United States) **J Arias**	**6**	**6**
(Sweden) T Högstedt	3	3
(United States) J Tarango	4	2
(Uruguay) **D Pérez**	**6**	**6**
WC	(Sweden) M Pernfors	4	4
Q	(Canada) **M Wostenholme**	**6**	**6**
Q	(Ecuador) R Viver	4	5
4	(United States) **R Reneberg**	**6**	**7**
8	(United States) D Pate	**6**	3	6^{3}
(United States) **B Pearce**	3	**6**	**7^{7}**
(United States) B Garrow	6^{3}	3
Q	(Argentina) **J Frana**	**7^{7}**	**6**
(Italy) **D Nargiso**	**6**	**7^{7}**
(New Zealand) K Evernden	2	6^{3}
(Peru) **P Arraya**	**7^{7}**	**6**
2	(United States) D Rostagno	6^{3}	3

Second round
1	(United States) **M Chang**	6^{5}	**6**	**7**
(United States) B Shelton	**7^{7}**	4	5
Q	(United States) J Brown	4	4
7	(Peru) **J Yzaga**	**6**	**6**
3	(United States) **D Wheaton**	**6**	**6**
(Czechoslovakia) P Korda	3	4
(United States) **M Washington**	**6**	**6**
(West Germany) C Saceanu	3	4
5	(United States) **J Arias**	**6**	**6**
(Uruguay) D Pérez	1	4
Q	(Canada) M Wostenholme	**6**	0	3
4	(United States) **R Reneberg**	4	**6**	**6**
(United States) B Pearce	4	2
Q	(Argentina) **J Frana**	**6**	**6**
(Italy) D Nargiso	**6**	4	6^{3}
(Peru) **P Arraya**	2	**6**	**7^{7}**

Quarterfinals
1	(United States) M Chang	6^{0}	1
7	(Peru) **J Yzaga**	**7^{7}**	**6**
3	(United States) D Wheaton	**7^{7}**	1	2
(United States) **M Washington**	6^{3}	**6**	**6**
5	(United States) **J Arias**	**6**	**6**
4	(United States) R Reneberg	4	2
Q	(Argentina) **J Frana**	**6**
(Peru) P Arraya	4	r

Semifinals
7	(Peru) **J Yzaga**	**7**	**6**
(United States) M Washington	5	2
5	(United States) **J Arias**	3	**6**	**7**
Q	(Argentina) J Frana	**6**	3	5

Final
7	(Peru) **Jaime Yzaga**	**6**	**7**
5	(United States) Jimmy Arias	3	5
