= 1990 U.S. Men's Clay Court Championships – Singles =

Singles
- 1990 U.S. Men's Clay Court Championships

Final
- Champion: (United States) David Wheaton
- Runner-up: (South Africa) Mark Kaplan
- Score: 6–4, 6–3

Details
- Draw: 32
- Seeds: 8

Events
Singles	Doubles
- U.S. Men's Clay Court Championships

Jay Berger was the defending champion, but did not participate this year.

David Wheaton won the title, defeating Mark Kaplan 6–4, 6–3 in the final.

== Seeds ==
A champion seed is indicated in bold text while text in italics indicates the round in which that seed was eliminated.

1. (United States) Richey Reneberg (second round)
2. (United States) Jim Grabb (first round)
3. (United States) **David Wheaton (champion)**
4. (United States) Scott Davis (first round)
5. (United States) Dan Goldie (first round)
6. (United States) Lawson Duncan (first round)
7. (United States) Derrick Rostagno (quarterfinals)
8. (United States) MaliVai Washington (semifinals)

== Draw ==
Key

- Q = Qualifier
- WC = Wild card
- LL = Lucky loser
- Alt = Alternate
- ITF = ITF entry
- PR = Protected ranking
- SR = Special ranking
- SE = Special exempt
- JE = Junior exempt
- JR = Junior Accelerator Programme entrant
- CO = College Accelerator Programme entrant
- NG = Next Gen Accelerator Program entrant
- w/o = Walkover
- r = Retired
- d = Defaulted

First round
1	(United States) **R Reneberg**	**6**	**7**
Q	(United States) T Mercer	4	6
(West Germany) **A Mronz**	**6**	**6**
WC	(United States) R Van't Hof	3	3
Q	(Peru) A Aramburú	0	2
(United States) **R Weiss**	**6**	**6**
(Puerto Rico) M Nido	1	1
7	(United States) **D Rostagno**	**6**	**6**
3	(United States) **D Wheaton**	3	**6**	**7**
(United States) R Matuszewski	**6**	1	5
(United States) B Shelton	0	3
Q	(South Africa) **C Campbell**	**6**	**6**
(United States) **C Garner**	**6**	**7**
Q	(United States) D Goldberg	4	6
(United States) **J Tarango**	**6**	**6**
6	(United States) L Duncan	3	4
5	(United States) D Goldie	3	**6**	3
(South Africa) **M Kaplan**	**6**	3	**6**
(United States) J Brown	1	2
(United States) **D Pate**	**6**	**6**
WC	(United States) J Ross	3	3
(United States) **J Rive**	**6**	**6**
(United States) **T Wilkison**	**6**	**6**
4	(United States) S Davis	3	2
WC/8	(United States) **M Washington**	**6**	**6**
(United States) L Shiras	2	1
(Mexico) **L Lavalle**	**6**	**6**
(Australia) B Dyke	3	1
(Canada) **M Wostenholme**	**6**	**6**
(United States) D Cassidy	2	1
(United States) **B Pearce**	**6**	**6**
2	(United States) J Grabb	1	4

Second round
1	(United States) R Reneberg	4	2
(West Germany) **A Mronz**	**6**	**6**
(United States) R Weiss	5	3
7	(United States) **D Rostagno**	**7**	**6**
3	(United States) **D Wheaton**	1	**6**	**7**
Q	(South Africa) C Campbell	**6**	3	5
(United States) C Garner	4	5
(United States) **J Tarango**	**6**	**7**
(South Africa) **M Kaplan**	**6**	**6**
(United States) D Pate	3	3
(United States) J Rive	1	3
(United States) **T Wilkison**	**6**	**6**
WC/8	(United States) **M Washington**	2	**6**	**6**
(Mexico) L Lavalle	**6**	3	2
(Canada) **M Wostenholme**	**6**	**6**
(United States) B Pearce	2	3

Quarterfinals
(West Germany) **A Mronz**	**6**	**6**
7	(United States) D Rostagno	3	2
3	(United States) **D Wheaton**	**6**	6	**7**
(United States) J Tarango	2	**7**	6
(South Africa) **M Kaplan**	**6**	**6**
(United States) T Wilkison	4	2
WC/8	(United States) **M Washington**	**6**	4	**6**
(Canada) M Wostenholme	4	**6**	3

Semifinals
(West Germany) A Mronz	**6**	5	2
3	(United States) **D Wheaton**	2	**7**	**6**
(South Africa) **M Kaplan**	**6**	**6**
WC/8	(United States) M Washington	2	3

Final
3	(United States) **David Wheaton**	**6**	**6**
(South Africa) Mark Kaplan	4	4
