= 2004 U.S. Men's Clay Court Championships – Singles =

Singles
- 2004 U.S. Men's Clay Court Championships

Final
- Champion: (Germany) Tommy Haas
- Runner-up: (United States) Andy Roddick
- Score: 6–3, 6–4

Details
- Draw: 32
- Seeds: 8

Events
Singles	Doubles
- U.S. Men's Clay Court Championships

The 2004 U.S. Men's Clay Court Championships – Singles was an event of the 2004 U.S. Men's Clay Court Championships professional tennis tournament played on outdoor clay courts in Houston, Texas in the United States and was part of the International Series of the 2004 ATP Tour. The tournament was held from April 12 through April 18, 2006. The singles draw comprised 32 players and eight of them were seeded. Andre Agassi was the defending champion but did not compete that year. Unseeded Tommy Haas won the singles title after a 6–3, 6–4 win in the final against first-seeded Andy Roddick.

== Seeds ==
A champion seed is indicated in bold text while text in italics indicates the round in which that seed was eliminated.

1. (United States) Andy Roddick (final)
2. (United States) Mardy Fish (first round)
3. (United States) Taylor Dent (first round)
4. (United States) James Blake (quarterfinals)
5. (Romania) Andrei Pavel (semifinals)
6. (United States) Robby Ginepri (first round)
7. (Peru) Luis Horna (semifinals)
8. (Austria) Jürgen Melzer (quarterfinals)

== Draw ==
Key

- Q = Qualifier
- WC = Wild card
- LL = Lucky loser
- Alt = Alternate
- ITF = ITF entry
- PR = Protected ranking
- SR = Special ranking
- SE = Special exempt
- JE = Junior exempt
- JR = Junior Accelerator Programme entrant
- CO = College Accelerator Programme entrant
- NG = Next Gen Accelerator Program entrant
- w/o = Walkover
- r = Retired
- d = Defaulted

First round
1	(United States) **A Roddick**	**6**	**7**
(Denmark) K Carlsen	1	5
(United States) **R Kendrick**	**6**	3	**7^{7}**
LL	(France) S de Chaunac	2	**6**	6^{2}
(Germany) A Popp	1	3
(Germany) **T Behrend**	**6**	**6**
Q	(Argentina) D Veronelli	3	1
8	(Austria) **J Melzer**	**6**	**6**
3	(United States) T Dent	**6**	5	6^{5}
(Argentina) **F Squillari**	0	**7**	**7^{7}**
(Argentina) M Vassallo Argüello	1	2
WC	(United States) **T Martin**	**6**	**6**
Q	(France) J-C Faurel	0	2
Q	(France) **S Robert**	**6**	**6**
WC	(United States) B Vahaly	3	1
7	(Peru) **L Horna**	**6**	**6**
5	(Romania) **A Pavel**	**6**	**6**
(Ecuador) N Lapentti	4	3
(Germany) L Burgsmüller	2	2
(Argentina) **J Acasuso**	**6**	**6**
Q	(Austria) A Peya	3	**7**	4
(Italy) **D Sanguinetti**	**6**	5	**6**
WC	(United States) W Odesnik	4	2
4	(United States) **J Blake**	**6**	**6**
6	(United States) R Ginepri	6^{5}	4
(Germany) **T Haas**	**7^{7}**	**6**
(Sweden) T Enqvist	4	4
(United States) **P Goldstein**	**6**	**6**
(Russia) **D Tursunov**	6^{3}	**6**	**7**
(Croatia) I Karlović	**7^{7}**	4	5
(United States) **A Bogomolov Jr.**	**6**	**6**
2	(United States) M Fish	3	1

Second round
1	(United States) **A Roddick**	**6**	**6**
(United States) R Kendrick	2	3
(Germany) T Behrend	2	4
8	(Austria) **J Melzer**	**6**	**6**
(Argentina) F Squillari	6^{3}	6^{6}
WC	(United States) **T Martin**	**7^{7}**	**7^{8}**
Q	(France) S Robert	**6**	1	3
7	(Peru) **L Horna**	0	**6**	**6**
5	(Romania) **A Pavel**	4	**6**	**6**
(Argentina) J Acasuso	**6**	3	2
(Italy) D Sanguinetti	5	3
4	(United States) **J Blake**	**7**	**6**
(Germany) **T Haas**	**6**	**6**
(United States) P Goldstein	4	2
(Russia) **D Tursunov**	**6**	3	**6**
(United States) A Bogomolov Jr.	2	**6**	2

Quarterfinals
1	(United States) **A Roddick**	**7**	**7^{7}**
8	(Austria) J Melzer	5	6^{5}
WC	(United States) T Martin	5	3
7	(Peru) **L Horna**	**7**	**6**
5	(Romania) **A Pavel**	**6**	**6**
3	(United States) J Blake	4	4
(Germany) **T Haas**	**6**	**6**
(Russia) D Tursunov	2	0

Semifinals
1	(United States) **A Roddick**	**6**	**6**
7	(Peru) L Horna	3	4
5	(Romania) A Pavel	4	**7^{7}**	4
(Germany) **T Haas**	**6**	6^{4}	**6**

Final
1	(United States) Andy Roddick	3	4
(Germany) **Tommy Haas**	**6**	**6**
