= 1992 U.S. Men's Clay Court Championships =

- Date: May 4–11
- Edition: 24th
- Category: World Series
- Draw: 32S / 16D
- Prize money: $225,000
- Surface: Clay / outdoor
- Location: Charlotte, North Carolina, U.S.

Champions

Singles
- (United States) MaliVai Washington

Doubles
- (United States) Steve DeVries / (Australia) David Macpherson
← 1991 ·	U.S. Men's Clay Court Championships	· 1993 →

The 1992 U.S. Men's Clay Court Championships was an Association of Tennis Professionals men's tennis tournament held in Charlotte, North Carolina in the United States. It was the 24th edition of the tournament and was held from May 4 to May 11, 1992. Fourth-seeded MaliVai Washington won the singles title.

== Finals ==
=== Singles ===
(United States) MaliVai Washington defeated (Switzerland) Claudio Mezzadri 6–3, 6–3

- It was Washington's 2nd singles title of the year and of his career.

=== Doubles ===
(United States) Steve DeVries / (Australia) David Macpherson defeated (United States) Bret Garnett / (United States) Jared Palmer 6–4, 7–6

- It was DeVries's 2nd title of the year and the 2nd of his career. It was Palmer's 4th title of the year and the 5th of his career.
