= 1989 U.S. Men's Clay Court Championships – Singles =

Singles
- 1989 U.S. Men's Clay Court Championships

Final
- Champion: (United States) Jay Berger
- Runner-up: (United States) Lawson Duncan
- Score: 6–4, 6–3

Details
- Draw: 32
- Seeds: 8

Events
Singles	Doubles
- U.S. Men's Clay Court Championships

== Seeds ==
A champion seed is indicated in bold text while text in italics indicates the round in which that seed was eliminated.

1. (United States) Brad Gilbert (quarterfinals)
2. (United States) Michael Chang (quarterfinals)
3. (Brazil) Luiz Mattar (quarterfinals)
4. (United States) Dan Goldie (first round)
5. (United States) Johan Kriek (second round)
6. (United States) **Jay Berger (champion)**
7. (United States) Paul Annacone (first round)
8. (Socialist Federal Republic of Yugoslavia) Bruno Orešar (first round)

== Draw ==
Key

- Q = Qualifier
- WC = Wild card
- LL = Lucky loser
- Alt = Alternate
- ITF = ITF entry
- PR = Protected ranking
- SR = Special ranking
- SE = Special exempt
- JE = Junior exempt
- JR = Junior Accelerator Programme entrant
- CO = College Accelerator Programme entrant
- NG = Next Gen Accelerator Program entrant
- w/o = Walkover
- r = Retired
- d = Defaulted

First round
1	(United States) **B Gilbert**	**7**	3	**6**
Q	(United States) J Rive	6	**6**	1
(United States) **J Pugh**	**7**	**6**
(United States) R Seguso	6	0
(United States) **T Wilkison**	**7**	**6**
(United States) S Giammalva Jr.	5	2
(United States) **J Arias**	**6**	**6**
8	(Socialist Federal Republic of Yugoslavia) B Orešar	1	3
4	(United States) D Goldie	3	**6**	3
WC	(Argentina) **G Vilas**	**6**	4	**6**
(Sweden) T Svantesson	5	5
(United States) **L Duncan**	**7**	**7**
(Brazil) **C Motta**	**6**	**6**
(Peru) J Yzaga	4	1
Q	(Argentina) G Rivas	3	5
5	(United States) **J Kriek**	**6**	**7**
6	(United States) **J Berger**	**6**	**6**
(Italy) C Panatta	3	1
WC	(United States) R Leach	1	2
(United States) **J Courier**	**6**	**6**
WC	(United States) C Adams	4	**6**	6
(Austria) **A Antonitsch**	**6**	2	**7**
(United States) D Pate	**7**	4	0
3	(Brazil) **L Mattar**	6	**6**	**6**
7	(United States) P Annacone	2	**6**	4
(South Africa) **B Moir**	**6**	3	**6**
(United States) R Reneberg	**6**	4	4
(Argentina) **J Frana**	2	**6**	**6**
(Uruguay) **D Pérez**	**6**	**7**
Q	(United States) C Garner	2	5
Q	(United States) J Brown	**6**	3	4
2	(United States) **M Chang**	3	**6**	**6**

Second round
1	(United States) **B Gilbert**	**6**	**6**
(United States) J Pugh	3	3
(United States) **T Wilkison**	**6**	**6**
(United States) J Arias	4	4
WC	(Argentina) G Vilas	**6**	2	1
(United States) **L Duncan**	3	**6**	**6**
(Brazil) **C Motta**	**7**	**7**
5	(United States) J Kriek	5	5
6	(United States) **J Berger**	**7**	4	**6**
(United States) J Courier	6	**6**	3
(Austria) A Antonitsch	3	**7**	4
3	(Brazil) **L Mattar**	**6**	6	**6**
(South Africa) B Moir	2	4
(Argentina) **J Frana**	**6**	**6**
(Uruguay) D Pérez	3	3
2	(United States) **M Chang**	**6**	**6**

Quarterfinals
1	(United States) B Gilbert	0	1
(United States) **T Wilkison**	**6**	**6**
(United States) **L Duncan**	**6**	**6**
(Brazil) C Motta	2	0
6	(United States) **J Berger**	**6**	**6**
3	(Brazil) L Mattar	2	2
(Argentina) **J Frana**	w/o
2	(United States) M Chang

Semifinals
(United States) T Wilkison	6	3
(United States) **L Duncan**	**7**	**6**
6	(United States) **J Berger**	4	**6**	**6**
(Argentina) J Frana	**6**	2	4

Final
(United States) Lawson Duncan	4	3
6	(United States) **Jay Berger**	**6**	**6**
