= 1992 U.S. Men's Clay Court Championships – Singles =

Singles
- 1992 U.S. Men's Clay Court Championships

Final
- Champion: (United States) MaliVai Washington
- Runner-up: (Switzerland) Claudio Mezzadri
- Score: 6–3, 6–3

Details
- Draw: 32
- Seeds: 8

Events
Singles	Doubles
- U.S. Men's Clay Court Championships

Jaime Yzaga was the defending champion, but lost in the first round this year.

MaliVai Washington won the title, defeating Claudio Mezzadri 6–3, 6–3 in the final.

== Seeds ==
A champion seed is indicated in bold text while text in italics indicates the round in which that seed was eliminated.

1. (United States) Aaron Krickstein (quarterfinals)
2. (United States) David Wheaton (first round)
3. (United States) Derrick Rostagno (second round)
4. (United States) **MaliVai Washington (champion)**
5. (Peru) Jaime Yzaga (first round)
6. (Argentina) Franco Davín (quarterfinals)
7. (United States) Bryan Shelton (first round)
8. (Spain) Francisco Roig (second round)

== Draw ==
Key

- Q = Qualifier
- WC = Wild card
- LL = Lucky loser
- Alt = Alternate
- ITF = ITF entry
- PR = Protected ranking
- SR = Special ranking
- SE = Special exempt
- JE = Junior exempt
- JR = Junior Accelerator Programme entrant
- CO = College Accelerator Programme entrant
- NG = Next Gen Accelerator Program entrant
- w/o = Walkover
- r = Retired
- d = Defaulted

First round
1	(United States) **A Krickstein**	**6**	**6**
(Netherlands) J Eltingh	3	1
(United States) **T Witsken**	**6**	**6**
(Argentina) R Azar	3	2
(United States) J Arias	4	4
(United States) **J Tarango**	**6**	**6**
(Spain) **M A Górriz**	6^{3}	**6**	**6**
7	(United States) B Shelton	**7^{7}**	4	2
4	(United States) **M Washington**	**6**	**6**
(Argentina) H de la Peña	3	1
Q	(United States) **C Garner**	**6**	3	**7^{7}**
(Italy) C Pistolesi	4	**6**	6^{4}
(Italy) P Canè	4	**6**	3
(United States) **J Grabb**	**6**	4	**6**
WC	(United States) P McEnroe	2	6^{5}
6	(Argentina) **F Davín**	**6**	**7^{7}**
5	(Peru) J Yzaga	3	**6**	6^{9}
(Switzerland) **C Mezzadri**	**6**	1	**7^{11}**
(Peru) P Arraya	6^{0}	**6**	1
WC	(United States) **T Martin**	**7^{7}**	3	**6**
(Uruguay) M Filippini	**6**	0	5
(Australia) **R Fromberg**	2	**6**	**7**
(France) J-P Fleurian	4	5
3	(United States) **D Rostagno**	**6**	**7**
8	(Spain) **F Roig**	**6**	**6**
Q	(Argentina) P Albano	0	1
(Belgium) E Masso	3	6^{7}
(Australia) **M Woodforde**	**6**	**7^{9}**
(Brazil) **L Mattar**	**6**	**6**
Q	(United States) J Stark	4	4
Q	(United States) J Brown	**6**	2	6^{6}
WC/2	(United States) **D Wheaton**	4	**6**	**7^{8}**

Second round
1	(United States) **A Krickstein**	**6**	**6**
(United States) T Witsken	3	1
(United States) **J Tarango**	**7^{7}**	**6**
(Spain) M A Górriz	6^{4}	2
4	(United States) **M Washington**	**6**	**6**
Q	(United States) C Garner	3	0
(United States) J Grabb	3	**6**	6^{4}
6	(Argentina) **F Davín**	**6**	4	**7^{7}**
(Switzerland) **C Mezzadri**	**6**	**6**
WC	(United States) T Martin	1	3
(Australia) **R Fromberg**	**6**	**6**
3	(United States) D Rostagno	3	3
8	(Spain) F Roig	4	5
(Australia) **M Woodforde**	**6**	**7**
(Brazil) **L Mattar**	6^{4}	**6**	**6**
WC/2	(United States) D Wheaton	**7^{7}**	2	4

Quarterfinals
1	(United States) A Krickstein	**7**	6^{4}	1
(United States) **J Tarango**	5	**7^{7}**	**6**
4	(United States) **M Washington**	**6**	**7**
6	(Argentina) F Davín	3	5
(Switzerland) **C Mezzadri**	**7^{7}**	6^{5}	**6**
(Australia) R Fromberg	6^{3}	**7^{7}**	2
(Australia) M Woodforde	4	3
(Brazil) **L Mattar**	**6**	**6**

Semifinals
(United States) J Tarango	4	4
4	(United States) **M Washington**	**6**	**6**
(Switzerland) **C Mezzadri**	**6**	3	**7**
(Brazil) L Mattar	3	**6**	5

Final
4	(United States) **MaliVai Washington**	**6**	**6**
(Switzerland) Claudio Mezzadri	3	3
