= 1993 U.S. Men's Clay Court Championships – Doubles =

Doubles
- 1993 U.S. Men's Clay Court Championships

Final
- Champions: (Sweden) Rikard Bergh (United States) Trevor Kronemann
- Runners-up: (Argentina) Javier Frana (Italy) Leonardo Lavalle
- Score: 6–1, 6–2

Details
- Draw: 16
- Seeds: 4

Events
Singles	Doubles
- U.S. Men's Clay Court Championships

Rikard Bergh and Trevor Kronemann won the title, defeating Javier Frana and Leonardo Lavalle in the final.

== Seeds ==
Champion seeds are indicated in bold text while text in italics indicates the round in which those seeds were eliminated.

1. (United States) Steve DeVries / (Netherlands) Jacco Eltingh (first round)
2. (United States) Mike Briggs / (South Africa) Brent Haygarth (first round)
3. (United States) Jim Pugh / (United States) Greg Van Emburgh (quarterfinals)
4. (United States) Luke Jensen / (United States) Murphy Jensen (first round)

== Draw ==
Key

- Q = Qualifier
- WC = Wild card
- LL = Lucky loser
- Alt = Alternate
- ITF = ITF entry
- PR = Protected ranking
- SR = Special ranking
- SE = Special exempt
- JE = Junior exempt
- JR = Junior Accelerator Programme entrant
- CO = College Accelerator Programme entrant
- NG = Next Gen Accelerator Program entrant
- w/o = Walkover
- r = Retired
- d = Defaulted

First round
1	(United States) S DeVries (Netherlands) J Eltingh	5	**6**	2
**(Sweden) R Bergh** **(United States) T Kronemann**	**7**	2	**6**
**(Argentina) P Albano** **(Argentina) H de la Peña**	4	**6**	**6**
Q	(Chile) S Cortés (Spain) M Górriz	**6**	4	4
3	**(United States) J Pugh** **(United States) G Van Emburgh**	**6**	**6**
(United States) D Eisenman (United States) B Joelson	2	4
(United States) C Beckman (Sweden) T Svantesson	3	5
WC	**(United States) T Martin** **(United States) D Rostagno**	**6**	**7**
(Argentina) C Miniussi (Uruguay) D Pérez	3	4
**(United States) B Dunn** **(United States) J Tarango**	**6**	**6**
**(Argentina) J Frana** **(Mexico) L Lavalle**	**6**	1	**6**
4	(United States) L Jensen (United States) M Jensen	2	**6**	1
**(South Africa) R Deppe** **(Venezuela) N Pereira**	**7**	**6**
(Portugal) J Cunha-Silva (United States) T Nelson	5	2
**(United States) B Shelton** **(United States) T Witsken**	**6**	**6**
2	(United States) M Briggs (South Africa) B Haygarth	4	3

Quarterfinals
**(Sweden) R Bergh** **(United States) T Kronemann**	**6**	**7**
(Argentina) P Albano (Argentina) H de la Peña	4	5
3	(United States) J Pugh (United States) G Van Emburgh	5	**6**	4
WC	**(United States) T Martin** **(United States) D Rostagno**	**7**	1	**6**
(United States) B Dunn (United States) J Tarango	1	1
**(Argentina) J Frana** **(Mexico) L Lavalle**	**6**	**6**
**(South Africa) R Deppe** **(Venezuela) N Pereira**	**6**	**7**
(United States) B Shelton (United States) T Witsken	3	6

Semifinals
**(Sweden) R Bergh** **(United States) T Kronemann**	**7**	**6**
WC	(United States) T Martin (United States) D Rostagno	5	2
**(Argentina) J Frana** **(Mexico) L Lavalle**	4	**6**	**6**
(South Africa) R Deppe (Venezuela) N Pereira	**6**	3	2

Final
**(Sweden) R Bergh** **(United States) T Kronemann**	**6**	**6**
(Argentina) J Frana (Mexico) L Lavalle	1	2
