= 2003 U.S. Men's Clay Court Championships – Doubles =

Doubles
- 2003 U.S. Men's Clay Court Championships

Final
- Champions: (The Bahamas) Mark Knowles (Canada) Daniel Nestor
- Runners-up: (United States) Jan-Michael Gambill (United States) Graydon Oliver
- Score: 6–4, 6–3

Details
- Draw: 16
- Seeds: 4

Events
Singles	Doubles
- U.S. Men's Clay Court Championships

Mardy Fish and Andy Roddick were the defending champions but lost in the semifinals to Mark Knowles and Daniel Nestor.

Knowles and Nestor won in the final 6–4, 6–3 against Jan-Michael Gambill and Graydon Oliver.

== Seeds ==
Champion seeds are indicated in bold text while text in italics indicates the round in which those seeds were eliminated.

1. (The Bahamas) **Mark Knowles** / (Canada) **Daniel Nestor (champions)**
2. (United States) Jan-Michael Gambill / (United States) Graydon Oliver (final)
3. (Argentina) Sebastián Prieto / (Brazil) André Sá (first round)
4. (United States) Devin Bowen / (Australia) Ashley Fisher (semifinals)

== Draw ==
Key

- Q = Qualifier
- WC = Wild card
- LL = Lucky loser
- Alt = Alternate
- ITF = ITF entry
- PR = Protected ranking
- SR = Special ranking
- SE = Special exempt
- JE = Junior exempt
- JR = Junior Accelerator Programme entrant
- CO = College Accelerator Programme entrant
- NG = Next Gen Accelerator Program entrant
- w/o = Walkover
- r = Retired
- d = Defaulted

First round
1	(The Bahamas) **M Knowles** (Canada) **D Nestor**	3	**6**	**7^{1}**
WC	(United States) P Goldstein (United States) R Kendrick	**6**	1	6^{1}
(The Bahamas) **M Merklein** (United States) **J Morrison**	**6**	**6**
WC	(United States) J Blake (United States) T Blake	4	4
3	(Argentina) S Prieto (Brazil) A Sá	1	2
(United States) **M Fish** (United States) **A Roddick**	**6**	**6**
(United States) **J Thomas** (United States) **B Vahaly**	**6**	**6**
(United States) T Dent (United States) C Mamiit	4	2
(United States) B MacPhie (United States) T Martin	5	4
(Sweden) **S Aspelin** (Germany) **N Kiefer**	**7**	**6**
(Japan) T Shimada (South Africa) M Wakefield	4	5
4	(United States) **D Bowen** (Australia) **A Fisher**	**6**	**7**
(United States) **J Gimelstob** (United States) **S Humphries**	3	**6**	**6**
(Denmark) K Carlsen (Austria) J Melzer	**6**	3	3
(Peru) L Horna (Argentina) S Roitman	4	0^{r}
2	(United States) **J-M Gambill** (United States) **G Oliver**	**6**	1

Quarterfinals
1	(The Bahamas) **M Knowles** (Canada) **D Nestor**	**6**	**6**
(The Bahamas) M Merklein (United States) J Morrison	3	1
(United States) **M Fish** (United States) **A Roddick**	**7**	**6**
(United States) J Thomas (United States) B Vahaly	5	3
(Sweden) S Aspelin (Germany) N Kiefer
4	(United States) **D Bowen** (Australia) **A Fisher**	w/o
(United States) J Gimelstob (United States) S Humphries	5	**6**	6^{6}
2	(United States) **J-M Gambill** (United States) **G Oliver**	**7**	4	**7^{8}**

Semifinals
1	(The Bahamas) **M Knowles** (Canada) **D Nestor**	3	**6**	**6**
(United States) M Fish (United States) A Roddick	**6**	3	2
4	(United States) D Bowen (Australia) A Fisher	6^{6}	5
2	(United States) **J-M Gambill** (United States) **G Oliver**	**7^{8}**	**7**

Final
1	(The Bahamas) **M Knowles** (Canada) **D Nestor**	**6**	**6**
2	(United States) J-M Gambill (United States) G Oliver	4	3
