= 1990 U.S. Men's Clay Court Championships =

- Date: May 7–14
- Edition: 22nd
- Category: ATP World Series
- Draw: 32S / 16D
- Prize money: $197,000
- Surface: Clay / outdoor
- Location: Kiawah Island, SC, U.S.

Champions

Singles
- (United States) David Wheaton

Doubles
- (United States) Scott Davis / (United States) David Pate
← 1989 ·	U.S. Men's Clay Court Championships	· 1991 →

The 1990 U.S. Men's Clay Court Championships was an Association of Tennis Professionals men's tennis tournament held in Kiawah Island, South Carolina in the United States. It was the 22nd edition of the tournament and was held from May 7 to May 14, 1990. Third-seeded David Wheaton won the singles title.

== Finals ==
=== Singles ===
(United States) David Wheaton defeated (South Africa) Mark Kaplan 6–4, 6–4

- It was Wheaton's 1st title of the year and the 1st of his career.

=== Doubles ===
(United States) Scott Davis / (United States) David Pate defeated (United States) Jim Grabb / (Mexico) Leonardo Lavalle 6–2, 6–3

- It was Davis's 3rd title of the year and the 15th of his career. It was Pate's 2nd title of the year and the 13th of his career.
