= 1989 U.S. Men's Clay Court Championships =

- Date: May 8–15
- Edition: 21st
- Category: Grand Prix
- Draw: 32S / 16D
- Prize money: $190,000
- Surface: Clay / outdoor
- Location: Charleston, South Carolina, U.S.

Champions

Singles
- (United States) Jay Berger

Doubles
- (Sweden) Mikael Pernfors / (Sweden) Tobias Svantesson
← 1988 ·	U.S. Men's Clay Court Championships	· 1990 →

The 1989 U.S. Men's Clay Court Championships was a Grand Prix men's tennis tournament held in Charleston, South Carolina in the United States. It was the 21st edition of the tournament and was held from May 8 to May 15, 1989. Sixth-seeded Jay Berger won the singles title.

== Finals ==
=== Singles ===
(United States) Jay Berger defeated (United States) Lawson Duncan 6–4, 6–3

- It was Berger's only title of the year and the 4th of his career.

=== Doubles ===
(Sweden) Mikael Pernfors / (Sweden) Tobias Svantesson defeated (Mexico) Agustín Moreno / (Peru) Jaime Yzaga 6–4, 4–6, 7–5

- It was Pernfors's only title of the year and the 3rd of his career. It was Svantesson's 1st title of the year and the 1st of his career.
