= 1989 U.S. Men's Clay Court Championships – Doubles =

Doubles
- 1989 U.S. Men's Clay Court Championships

Final
- Champions: (Sweden) Mikael Pernfors (Sweden) Tobias Svantesson
- Runners-up: (Mexico) Agustín Moreno (Peru) Jaime Yzaga
- Score: 6–4, 4–6, 7–5

Details
- Draw: 16
- Seeds: 4

Events
Singles	Doubles
- U.S. Men's Clay Court Championships

Mikael Pernfors and Tobias Svantesson won in the final against Agustín Moreno and Jaime Yzaga.

== Seeds ==
Champion seeds are indicated in bold text while text in italics indicates the round in which those seeds were eliminated.

1. (United States) David Pate / (United States) Tim Wilkison (semifinals)
2. (United States) Paul Annacone / (United States) Johan Kriek (semifinals)
3. (United States) Brad Gilbert / (United States) Robert Seguso (first round)
4. (United States) Dan Goldie / (United States) Greg Van Emburgh (first round)

== Draw ==
Key

- Q = Qualifier
- WC = Wild card
- LL = Lucky loser
- Alt = Alternate
- ITF = ITF entry
- PR = Protected ranking
- SR = Special ranking
- SE = Special exempt
- JE = Junior exempt
- JR = Junior Accelerator Programme entrant
- CO = College Accelerator Programme entrant
- NG = Next Gen Accelerator Program entrant
- w/o = Walkover
- r = Retired
- d = Defaulted

First round
1	**(United States) David Pate** **(United States) Tim Wilkison**	2	**7**	**7**
(Venezuela) Alfonso Mora (United States) Mark Ozer	**6**	6	6
(Mexico) Luis Herrera (United States) John Sobel	0	2
**(United States) Luke Jensen** **(United States) Tim Siegel**	**6**	**6**
4	(United States) Dan Goldie (United States) Greg Van Emburgh	6	3
**(Sweden) Mikael Pernfors** **(Sweden) T Svantesson**	**7**	**6**
(South Africa) Craig Campbell (United States) Joe DeFoor	5	**6**	1
**(United States) Chuck Adams** **(United States) Chris Garner**	**7**	2	**6**
(United States) Jay Berger (Puerto Rico) Miguel Nido	6	**6**	2
**(United States) Jim Courier** **(Brazil) Cássio Motta**	**7**	3	**6**
**(Mexico) Agustín Moreno** **(Peru) Jaime Yzaga**	4	**6**	**6**
3	(United States) Brad Gilbert (United States) Robert Seguso	**6**	3	3
**(United States) S Giammalva Jr.** **(United States) Richey Reneberg**	**4**	**7**	**6**
**(United States) Jimmy Arias** **(United States) Greg Holmes**	**4**	**7**	**6**
(United States) Joey Rive (United States) Leif Shiras	**6**	3	6
2	**(United States) Paul Annacone** **(United States) Johan Kriek**	4	**6**	**7**

Quarterfinals
1	**(United States) David Pate** **(United States) Tim Wilkison**	**6**	**6**
(United States) Luke Jensen (United States) Tim Siegel	0	2
**(Sweden) Mikael Pernfors** **(Sweden) T Svantesson**	**7**	**7**
(United States) Chuck Adams (United States) Chris Garner	6	5
(United States) Jim Courier (Brazil) Cássio Motta	2	6
**(Mexico) Agustín Moreno** **(Peru) Jaime Yzaga**	**6**	**7**
(United States) Jimmy Arias (United States) Greg Holmes	2	**6**	1
2	**(United States) Paul Annacone** **(United States) Johan Kriek**	**6**	4	**6**

Semifinals
1	(United States) David Pate (United States) Tim Wilkison	4	**6**	4
**(Sweden) Mikael Pernfors** **(Sweden) T Svantesson**	**6**	4	**6**
**(Mexico) Agustín Moreno** **(Peru) Jaime Yzaga**	6	**6**	**7**
2	(United States) Paul Annacone (United States) Johan Kriek	**7**	2	5

Final
**(Sweden) Mikael Pernfors** **(Sweden) T Svantesson**	**6**	4	**7**
(Mexico) Agustín Moreno (Peru) Jaime Yzaga	4	**6**	5
