= 2005 U.S. Men's Clay Court Championships =

- Date: April 18–25
- Edition: 37th
- Category: International Series
- Draw: 32S / 16D
- Prize money: $355,000
- Surface: Clay / outdoor
- Location: Houston, Texas, US

Champions

Singles
- (United States) Andy Roddick

Doubles
- (The Bahamas) Mark Knowles / (Canada) Daniel Nestor
← 2004 ·	U.S. Men's Clay Court Championships	· 2006 →

The 2005 U.S. Men's Clay Court Championships was an Association of Tennis Professionals men's tennis tournament held in Houston, Texas in the United States. The event was played on outdoor clay courts and was part of the International Series of the 2005 ATP Tour. It was the 37th edition of the tournament and was held from April 18 to April 25, 2005. First-seeded Andy Roddick won the singles tournament.

== Finals ==
=== Singles ===
(United States) Andy Roddick defeated (France) Sébastien Grosjean 6–2, 6–2

- It was Roddick's 2nd title of the year and the 19th of his career.

=== Doubles ===
(The Bahamas) Mark Knowles / (Canada) Daniel Nestor defeated (Argentina) Martín García / (Peru) Luis Horna 6–3, 6–4

- It was Knowles's 2nd title of the year and the 37th of his career. It was Nestor's 2nd title of the year and the 39th of his career.
