= 2003 U.S. Men's Clay Court Championships – Singles =

Singles
- 2003 U.S. Men's Clay Court Championships

Final
- Champion: (United States) Andre Agassi
- Runner-up: (United States) Andy Roddick
- Score: 3–6, 6–3, 6–4

Details
- Draw: 32
- Seeds: 8

Events
Singles	Doubles
- U.S. Men's Clay Court Championships

The 2003 U.S. Men's Clay Court Championships – Singles was an event of the 2003 U.S. Men's Clay Court Championships professional tennis tournament played on outdoor clay courts at the Westside Tennis Club in Houston, Texas in the United States and was part of the International Series of the 2003 ATP Tour. The tournament was held from April 21 through April 27, 2006. The singles draw comprised 32 players and eight of them were seeded. Second-seeded Andy Roddick was the defending champion but lost in the final 3–6, 6–3, 6–4 against first-seeded Andre Agassi.

== Seeds ==
A champion seed is indicated in bold text while text in italics indicates the round in which that seed was eliminated.

1. (United States) **Andre Agassi (champion)**
2. (United States) Andy Roddick (final)
3. (United States) James Blake (quarterfinals)
4. (United States) Taylor Dent (first round)
5. (United States) Vince Spadea (second round)
6. (United States) Jan-Michael Gambill (first round)
7. (United States) ~~Robby Ginepri~~ (withdrew because of a right hand injury)
8. (South Korea) Hyung-Taik Lee (first round)

== Draw ==
Key

- Q = Qualifier
- WC = Wild card
- LL = Lucky loser
- Alt = Alternate
- ITF = ITF entry
- PR = Protected ranking
- SR = Special ranking
- SE = Special exempt
- JE = Junior exempt
- JR = Junior Accelerator Programme entrant
- CO = College Accelerator Programme entrant
- NG = Next Gen Accelerator Program entrant
- w/o = Walkover
- r = Retired
- d = Defaulted

First round
1	(United States) **A Agassi**	**6**	**6**
(Croatia) Ž Krajan	2	0
(United States) B Vahaly	3	**7^{7}**	3
(Georgia (country)) **I Labadze**	**6**	6^{2}	**6**
(Brazil) A Sá	6^{2}	0
Q	(Brazil) **R Mello**	**7^{7}**	**6**
(United States) **T Martin**	**6**	**6**
8	(South Korea) H-T Lee	3	4
4	(United States) T Dent	**6**	6^{4}	3
(Austria) **J Melzer**	4	**7^{7}**	**6**
WC	(United States) T Blake	6^{5}	1
(Denmark) **K Carlsen**	**7^{7}**	**6**
Q	(Argentina) S Roitman	3	3
(United States) **M Fish**	**6**	**6**
(Peru) **L Horna**	**6**	**6**
6	(United States) J-M Gambill	2	4
LL	(United States) C Mamiit	3	1
(Brazil) **F Saretta**	**6**	**6**
(France) **O Mutis**	6^{1}	**6**	**6**
WC	(United States) H Armando	**7^{7}**	4	1
(Hungary) **A Sávolt**	**6**	**6**
(Germany) N Kiefer	3	2
(Germany) A Waske	4	4
3	(United States) **J Blake**	**6**	**6**
5	(United States) **V Spadea**	**6**	**6**
Q	(United States) J Brasington	3	3
(United States) J Gimelstob	2	4
(Brazil) **F Meligeni**	**6**	**6**
(Sweden) T Enqvist	1	6^{7}
Q	(United States) **P Goldstein**	**6**	**7^{9}**
WC	(United States) J Morrison	3	1
2	(United States) **A Roddick**	**6**	**6**

Second round
1	(United States) **A Agassi**	**6**	**6**
(Georgia (country)) I Labadze	2	0
Q	(Brazil) **R Mello**	**7^{8}**	**6**
(United States) T Martin	6^{6}	1
(Austria) **J Melzer**	5	**6**	**6**
(Denmark) K Carlsen	**7**	3	4
(United States) **M Fish**	**6**	**6**
(Peru) L Horna	2	4
(Brazil) F Saretta	2	0
(France) **O Mutis**	**6**	**6**
(Hungary) A Sávolt	2	6^{2}
3	(United States) **J Blake**	**6**	**7^{7}**
5	(United States) V Spadea	**6**	6^{6}	3
(Brazil) **F Meligeni**	4	**7^{8}**	**6**
Q	(United States) P Goldstein	5	4
2	(United States) **A Roddick**	**7**	**6**

Quarterfinals
1	(United States) **A Agassi**	**6**	**6**
Q	(Brazil) R Mello	0	1
(Austria) **J Melzer**	**7**	2	**7**
(United States) M Fish	5	**6**	5
(France) **O Mutis**	**6**	6^{3}	**6**
3	(United States) J Blake	4	**7^{7}**	1
(Brazil) F Meligeni	3	**6**	4
2	(United States) **A Roddick**	**6**	4	**6**

Semifinals
1	(United States) **A Agassi**	**6**	**6**
(Austria) J Melzer	4	1
(France) O Mutis	**6**	1	2
2	(United States) **A Roddick**	4	**6**	**6**

Final
1	(United States) **Andre Agassi**	3	**6**	**6**
2	(United States) Andy Roddick	**6**	3	4
