= 1992 U.S. Men's Clay Court Championships – Doubles =

Doubles
- 1992 U.S. Men's Clay Court Championships

Final
- Champions: (United States) Steve DeVries (Australia) David Macpherson
- Runners-up: (United States) Bret Garnett (United States) Jared Palmer
- Score: 6–4, 7–6

Details
- Draw: 16
- Seeds: 4

Events
| Singles | Doubles |
- U.S. Men's Clay Court Championships

Second-seeded pair Steve DeVries and David Macpherson won in the final against Bret Garnett and Jared Palmer. It was the pair's second victory in two weeks following their win at the AT&T Challenge in Atlanta.

== Seeds ==
Champion seeds are indicated in bold text while text in italics indicates the round in which those seeds were eliminated.

1. (United States) Ken Flach / (United States) Todd Witsken (first round)
2. (United States) **Steve DeVries / (Australia) David Macpherson (champions)**
3. (United States) Jim Grabb / (United States) David Wheaton (first round)
4. (Netherlands) Jacco Eltingh / (Netherlands) Tom Kempers (quarterfinals)

== Draw ==
Key

- Q = Qualifier
- WC = Wild card
- LL = Lucky loser
- Alt = Alternate
- ITF = ITF entry
- PR = Protected ranking
- SR = Special ranking
- SE = Special exempt
- JE = Junior exempt
- JR = Junior Accelerator Programme entrant
- CO = College Accelerator Programme entrant
- NG = Next Gen Accelerator Program entrant
- w/o = Walkover
- r = Retired
- d = Defaulted

First round
1 | (United States) Ken Flach (United States) Todd Witsken | 5 | 4
**(United States) Bret Garnett** **(United States) Jared Palmer** | **7** | **6**
**(United States) Shelby Cannon** **(United States) G Van Emburgh** | **6** | **7**
Q | (Argentina) Pablo Albano (Soviet Union) Andrei Olhovskiy | 2 | 6
3 | (United States) Jim Grabb (United States) David Wheaton | 5 | 1
**(South Africa) Stefan Kruger** **(United States) Brad Pearce** | **7** | **6**
(United States) Mark Keil (United States) Dave Randall | **7** | 5 | 3
**(United States) Brian Garrow** **(Australia) Mark Woodforde** | 6 | **7** | **6**
(United States) Robert Seguso (United States) Kenny Thorne | **6** | 6 | 2
**(United States) Charles Beckman** **(United States) Jeff Brown** | 3 | **7** | **6**
WC | (United States) Bryan Shelton (United States) M Washington | 4 | 6
4 | **(Netherlands) Jacco Eltingh** **(Netherlands) Tom Kempers** | **6** | **7**
**(Brazil) Ricardo Acioly** **(Brazil) Luiz Mattar** | 4 | **6** | **7**
LL | (Spain) Marcos Górriz (Spain) Francisco Roig | **6** | 4 | 6
WC | (United States) Matt Lucena (Norway) Bent-Ove Pedersen | 4 | 3
2 | **(United States) Steve DeVries** **(Australia) D Macpherson** | **6** | **6**

Quarterfinals
**(United States) Bret Garnett** **(United States) Jared Palmer** | **6** | **6**
(United States) Shelby Cannon (United States) Greg Van Emburgh | 4 | 3
**(South Africa) Stefan Kruger** **(United States) Brad Pearce** | **6** | **6**
(United States) Brian Garrow (Australia) Mark Woodforde | 4 | 3
**(United States) Charles Beckman** **(United States) Jeff Brown** | **6** | **6**
4 | (Netherlands) Jacco Eltingh (Netherlands) Tom Kempers | 3 | 4
(Brazil) Ricardo Acioly (Brazil) Luiz Mattar | 1 | 3
2 | **(United States) Steve DeVries** **(Australia) D Macpherson** | **6** | **6**

Semifinals
**(United States) Bret Garnett** **(United States) Jared Palmer** | 3 | **6** | **7**
(South Africa) Stefan Kruger (United States) Brad Pearce | **6** | 1 | 6
(United States) Charles Beckman (United States) Jeff Brown | **6** | 3 | 2
2 | **(United States) Steve DeVries** **(Australia) D Macpherson** | 2 | **6** | **6**

Final
(United States) Bret Garnett (United States) Jared Palmer | 4 | 6
2 | **(United States) Steve DeVries** **(Australia) D Macpherson** | **6** | **7**
