= 1991 U.S. Men's Clay Court Championships =

- Date: May 6–13
- Edition: 23rd
- Category: ATP World Series
- Draw: 32S / 16D
- Prize money: $215,000
- Surface: Clay / outdoor
- Location: Charlotte, North Carolina, U.S.

Champions

Singles
- (Peru) Jaime Yzaga

Doubles
- (United States) Rick Leach / (United States) Jim Pugh
← 1990 ·	U.S. Men's Clay Court Championships	· 1992 →

The 1991 U.S. Men's Clay Court Championships was an Association of Tennis Professionals men's tennis tournament held in Charlotte, North Carolina in the United States. The event was part of the ATP World Series category of the 1991 ATP Tour. It was the 23rd edition of the tournament and was played on outdoor clay courts and held from May 6 through May 13, 1991. Seventh-seeded Jaime Yzaga won the singles title.

== Finals ==
=== Singles ===
(Peru) Jaime Yzaga defeated (United States) Jimmy Arias 6–3, 7–5

- It was Yzaga's only singles title of the year and the 4th of his career.

=== Doubles ===
(United States) Rick Leach / (United States) Jim Pugh defeated (United States) Bret Garnett / (United States) Greg Van Emburgh 6–3, 2–6, 6–3

- It was Leach's 2nd title of the year and the 20th of his career. It was Pugh's 3rd title of the year and the 22nd of his career.
