= Mark Kaplan (tennis) =

South African tennis player

- Country (sports): South Africa
- Born: 20 December 1967 (age 57); Johannesburg, South Africa
- Height: 1.85 m (6 ft 1 in)
- Plays: Right-handed
- Prize money: $189,570

Singles
- Career record: 11–21
- Career titles: 0; 2 Challenger, 0 Futures
- Highest ranking: No. 117 (25 June 1990)

Grand Slam singles results
- Australian Open: 1R (1991, 1993)
- French Open: Q1 (1994)
- Wimbledon: 1R (1990)
- US Open: 1R (1990)

Doubles
- Career record: 1–3
- Career titles: 0; 1 Challenger, 0 Futures
- Highest ranking: No. 219 (29 August 1994)

Grand Slam doubles results
- Wimbledon: Q1 (1991, 1994)
- Last updated on: 18 September 2022.

Mark Kaplan (born 20 December 1967) is a South African tennis player. The right-hander reached his highest ATP singles ranking of 117 on 25 June 1990. He also reached a career high doubles ranking of 219. In college his doubles partner was Richard Lubner.

== ATP career finals ==
=== Singles: 1 (1 runner-up) ===
Legend Grand Slam Tournaments (0–0) ATP World Tour Finals (0–0) ATP Masters Series (0–0) ATP Championship Series (0–0) ATP World Series (0–1)	Finals by surface Hard (0–0) Clay (0–1) Grass (0–0) Carpet (0–0)	Finals by setting Outdoors (0–1) Indoors (0–0)

Result	W–L	Date	Tournament	Tier	Surface	Opponent	Score
Loss	0–1	May 1990	Kiawah Island, United States	World Series	Clay	(United States) David Wheaton	4–6, 4–6

== ATP Challenger and ITF Futures finals ==
=== Singles: 3 (2–1) ===
Legend ATP Challenger (2–1) ITF Futures (0–0)	Finals by surface Hard (2–1) Clay (0–0) Grass (0–0) Carpet (0–0)

Result	W–L	Date	Tournament	Tier	Surface	Opponent	Score
Win	1–0	Jul 1989	Aptos, United States	Challenger	Hard	(United States) Robbie Weiss	6–4, 6–4
Win	2–0	Nov 1989	Cape Town, South Africa	Challenger	Hard	(South Africa) Dean Botha	6–2, 6–1
Loss	2–1	May 1994	Taipei, Taiwan	Challenger	Hard	(Italy) Gianluca Pozzi	4–6, 0–6

=== Doubles: 2 (1–1) ===
Legend ATP Challenger (1–1) ITF Futures (0–0)	Finals by surface Hard (1–1) Clay (0–0) Grass (0–0) Carpet (0–0)

Result	W–L	Date	Tournament	Tier	Surface	Partner	Opponents	Score
Win	1–0	Aug 1989	New Haven, United States	Challenger	Hard	(United States) Brian Garrow	(South Africa) Craig Campbell (Philippines) Miguel Dungo	6–4, 6–3
Loss	1–1	Oct 1993	Réunion Island, Réunion	Challenger	Hard	(South Africa) Lan Bale	(United States) Jonathan Canter (United States) Jeff Tarango	4–6, 6–3, 5–7

== Performance timeline ==
Key
W	F	SF	QF	#R	RR	Q#	DNQ	A	NH

(W) winner; (F) finalist; (SF) semifinalist; (QF) quarterfinalist; (#R) rounds 4, 3, 2, 1; (RR) round-robin stage; (Q#) qualification round; (DNQ) did not qualify; (A) absent; (NH) not held; (SR) strike rate (events won / competed); (W–L) win–loss record.

=== Singles ===
Tournament	1990	1991	1992	1993	1994	1995	SR	W–L	Win %
Grand Slam tournaments
Australian Open	Q3	1R	Q2	1R	Q1	Q2	0 / 2	0–2	0%
French Open	A	A	A	A	Q1	A	0 / 0	0–0	–
Wimbledon	1R	Q1	A	A	Q2	A	0 / 1	0–1	0%
US Open	1R	A	Q3	Q1	Q2	A	0 / 1	0–1	0%
Win–loss	0–2	0–1	0–0	0–1	0–0	0–0	0 / 4	0–4	0%
ATP Masters Series
Indian Wells	A	A	A	A	A	Q1	0 / 0	0–0	–
Miami	A	A	A	A	Q1	Q2	0 / 0	0–0	–
Canada	A	A	A	1R	A	A	0 / 1	0–1	0%
Cincinnati	A	A	A	Q1	A	A	0 / 0	0–0	–
Win–loss	0–0	0–0	0–0	0–1	0–0	0–0	0 / 1	0–1	0%
