= 2003 U.S. Men's Clay Court Championships =

- Date: April 21–27
- Edition: 35th
- Category: International Series
- Draw: 32S / 16D
- Prize money: $355,000
- Surface: Clay / outdoor
- Location: Houston, TX, US
- Venue: Westside Tennis Club

Champions

Singles
- (United States) Andre Agassi

Doubles
- (The Bahamas) Mark Knowles / (Canada) Daniel Nestor
- U.S. Men's Clay Court Championships

The 2003 U.S. Men's Clay Court Championships was a men's tennis tournament played on outdoor clay courts at the Westside Tennis Club in Houston, Texas in the United States and was part of the International Series of the 2003 ATP Tour. It was the 35th edition of the tournament and ran from April 21 through April 27, 2003. First-seeded Andre Agassi won the singles title.

== Finals ==
=== Singles ===
(United States) Andre Agassi defeated (United States) Andy Roddick 3–6, 6–3, 6–4

- It was Agassi's 4th title of the year and the 59th of his career.

=== Doubles ===
(The Bahamas) Mark Knowles / (Canada) Daniel Nestor defeated (United States) Jan-Michael Gambill / (United States) Graydon Oliver 6–4, 6–3

- It was Knowles's 3rd title of the year and the 27th of his career. It was Nestor's 3rd title of the year and the 29th of his career.
