= 1993 U.S. Men's Clay Court Championships =

- Date: April 12–19
- Edition: 25th
- Category: World Series
- Draw: 32S / 16D
- Prize money: $275,000
- Surface: Clay / outdoor
- Location: Charlotte, North Carolina, U.S.

Champions

Singles
- (Argentina) Horacio de la Peña

Doubles
- (Sweden) Rikard Bergh / (United States) Trevor Kronemann
- U.S. Men's Clay Court Championships

The 1993 U.S. Men's Clay Court Championships was an Association of Tennis Professionals men's tennis tournament held in Charlotte, North Carolina in the United States that was part of the World Series of the 1993 ATP Tour. It was the 25th edition of the tournament and was held from April 12 to April 19, 1993. Unseeded Horacio de la Peña won the singles title.

== Finals ==
=== Singles ===
(Argentina) Horacio de la Peña defeated (Peru) Jaime Yzaga 3–6, 6–3, 6–4

- It was de la Peña's 1st title of the year and the 9th of his career.

=== Doubles ===
(Sweden) Rikard Bergh / (United States) Trevor Kronemann defeated (Argentina) Javier Frana / (Mexico) Leonardo Lavalle 6–1, 6–2

- It was Bergh's only title of the year and the 5th of his career. It was Kronemann's only title of the year and the 2nd of his career.
