= U.S. Men's Clay Court Championships =

Coordinates: 29.753°N 95.424°W

U.S. Men's Clay Court Championship

ATP Tour
- Event name: Fayez Sarofim & Co. U.S. Men's Clay Court Championship
- Location: Houston, Texas; United States
- Venue: River Oaks Country Club
- Category: Grand Prix Tour (1970–89); ATP World Series (1990–1999); ATP International Series (2000–2008); ATP World Tour 250 series (2009–2018); ATP Tour 250 series (2019–present)
- Surface: Maroon clay / outdoors
- Draw: 28S / 16D
- Prize money: $642,735 (2023), $742,350 (2025)
- Website: mensclaycourt.com

Current champions (2026)
- Singles: (United States) Tommy Paul
- Doubles: (Ecuador) Andrês Andrade (United States) Ben Shelton

The U.S. Men's Clay Court Championship (currently sponsored by Fayez Sarofim & Co.) is an annual ATP Tour tennis tournament. Founded in 1910, it has been held in nearly two dozen cities, and since 2001 has been held in Houston, Texas. It is the only remaining ATP Tour-level event in the United States to be played on clay courts.

== History ==
The tournament began in 1910 when the Western Lawn Tennis Association (a section of the United States Lawn Tennis Association now known as the USTA/Midwest) persuaded the USLTA that a National Clay Court Championship would promote the construction of more clay courts in the West. Clay courts were cheaper to install and maintain than grass courts, and the hope was that these lower costs would accelerate the growth of the game's popularity. The first National Clay Court Championships were held at the Omaha Field Club; a crowd of 5,000 watched the finals. Participation and play on clay grew as a result of the event and others, and in 1914, the event was moved to the Cincinnati Tennis Club. It has since been played in numerous cities. Between 1970 and 1989 it was part of the Grand Prix Tennis Tour as part of the Grand Prix Super Series of events (1974–1977). During the stint in Indianapolis, from 1969 through 1986, the tournament was a combined men's and women's event.

From 2001 to 2007, the event was held at the Houston Westside Tennis Club. In 2007, after a few years being held on the same red clay used at the French Open, the event switched to Har-Tru green clay. In 2007, the USTA sought a new venue and entertained bids from Atlanta, Georgia; Winston-Salem, North Carolina; and Ponte Vedra Beach, Florida. But in May 2007, the USTA announced that the tournament would simply move downtown to River Oaks Country Club in the River Oaks neighborhood. The new venue has a stadium with seating for 3,000 with temporary seating for 500 for the second court. Its Har-Tru clay, of a maroon color, was renewed in 2005 and 2008.

== Past finals ==
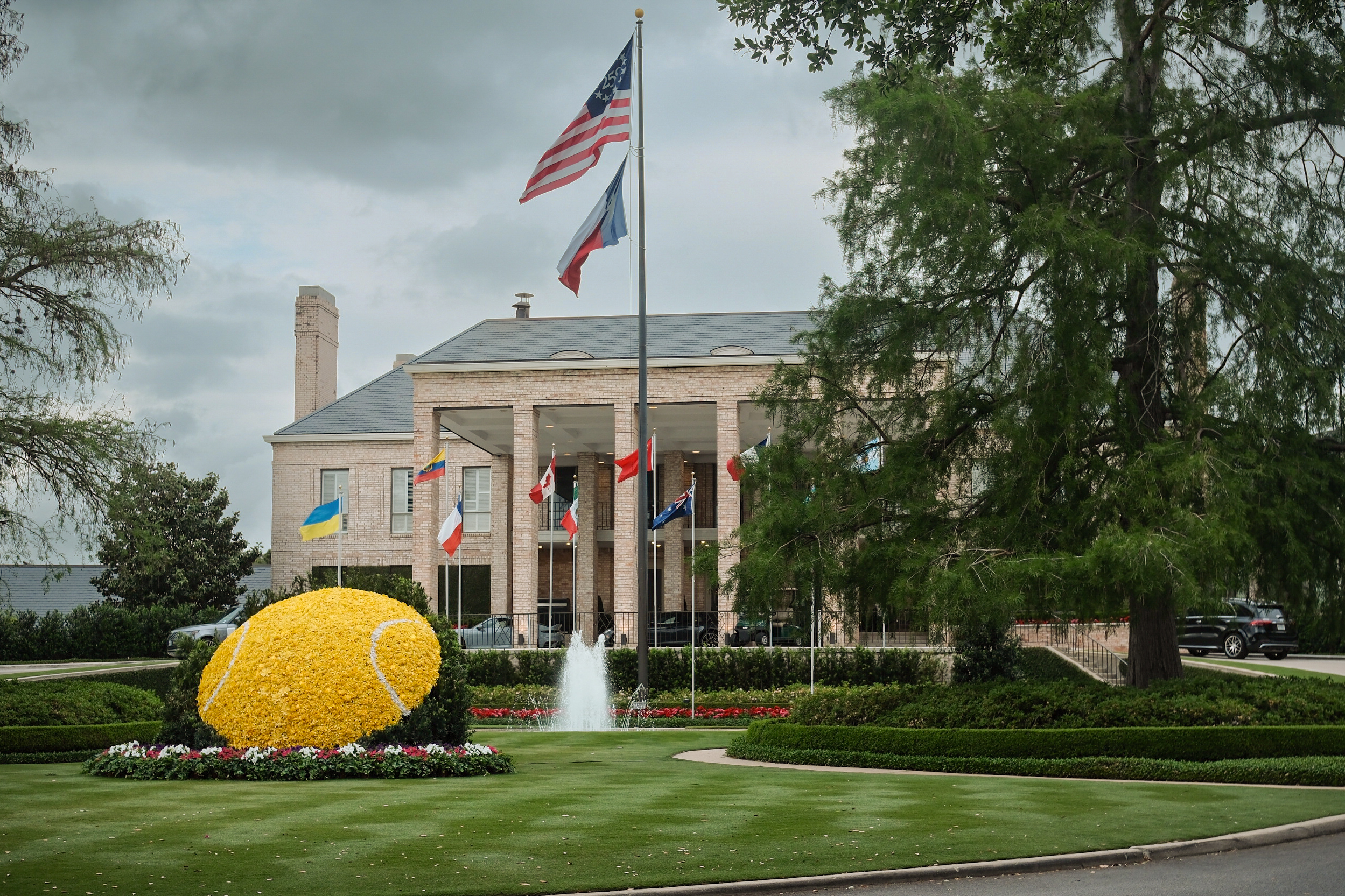
The River Oaks Country Club during Men's Clay Court Tennis 2026

=== Singles ===
Bill Tilden holds the record for most titles (7).
Bill Tilden and Frank Parker share the record of most finals (8).

Year	City	Champions	Runners-up	Score
1910	Omaha, Nebraska	(United States) Melville H. Long	(United States) Walter Merrill Hall	6–0, 6–1, 6–1
1911	Omaha, Nebraska	(United States) Walter T. Hayes	(United States) Percy D. Siverd	7–5, 6–2, 6–1
1912	Pittsburgh, Pennsylvania	(United States) Richard N. Williams	(United States) Walter T. Hayes	6–3, 6–1, 8–6
1913	Omaha, Nebraska	(United States) John R. Strachan	(United States) Walter Merrill Hall	6–0, 6–4, 4–6, 6–4
1914	Cincinnati, Ohio	(United States) Clarence Griffin	(United States) Elia Fottrell	3–6, 6–8, 8–6, 6–0, 6–2
1915	Pittsburgh, Pennsylvania	(United States) Richard N. Williams (2)	(United States) Clarence Griffin	Default
1916	Cleveland, Ohio	(United States) Willis E. Davis	(United States) Conrad B. Doyle	6–2, 7–5, 6–3
1917	Cincinnati, Ohio	(United States) Samuel Hardy	(United States) Charles Garland	3–6, 6–1, 6–3, 6–3
1918	Chicago, Illinois	(United States) Bill Tilden	(United States) Charles Garland	6–4, 6–4, 3–6, 6–2
1919	Chicago, Illinois	(United States) William Johnston	(United States) Bill Tilden	6–0, 6–1, 4–6, 6–2
1920	Chicago, Illinois	(United States) Roland Roberts	(United States) Vincent Richards	6–3, 6–1, 6–3
1921	Chicago, Illinois	(United States) Walter T. Hayes	(United States) Alexander Squair	6–0, 6–2, 6–4
1922	Indianapolis, Indiana	(United States) Bill Tilden (2)	(Japan) Zenzo Shimizu	7–5, 6–3, 6–1
1923	Indianapolis, Indiana	(United States) Bill Tilden (3)	(Spain) Manuel Alonso	6–2, 6–8, 6–1, 7–5
1924	St. Louis, Missouri	(United States) Bill Tilden (4)	(United States) Harvey Snodgrass	6–2, 6–1, 6–1
1925	St. Louis, Missouri	(United States) Bill Tilden (5)	(United States) George Lott	3–6, 6–3, 2–6, 6–2, 8–6
1926	Detroit, Michigan	(United States) Bill Tilden (6)	(South Africa) Brian I. C. Norton	Default
1927	Detroit, Michigan	(United States) Bill Tilden (7)	(United States) John F. Hennessey	6–4, 6–1, 6–2
1928	Not held			
1929	Indianapolis, Indiana	(United States) Emmett Paré	(United States) J. Gilbert Hall	6–4, 6–3, 4–6, 3–6, 6–1
1930	Kansas City, Missouri	(United States) Bryan Grant	(United States) Wilbur F. Coen, Jr.	6–2, 6–4, 6–2
1931	St. Louis, Missouri	(United States) Ellsworth Vines	(United States) Keith Gledhill	6–3, 6–3, 6–3
1932	Memphis, Tennessee	(United States) George Lott	(United States) Bryan Grant	3–6, 6–2, 3–6, 6–3, 6–3
1933	Chicago, Illinois	(United States) Frank Parker	(United States) Gene Mako	6–3, 6–3, 6–3
1934	Chicago, Illinois	(United States) Bryan Grant (2)	(United States) Donald Budge	6–2, 8–6, 6–3
1935	Chicago, Illinois	(United States) Bryan Grant (3)	(United States) Frank Parker	4–6, 6–1, 3–6, 6–3, 6–0
1936	River Forest, Illinois	(United States) Bobby Riggs	(United States) Frank Parker	6–1, 6–8, 6–4
1937	Chicago, Illinois	(United States) Bobby Riggs (2)	(United States) Joe Hunt	6–3, 4–6, 6–3, 6–4
1938	River Forest, Illinois	(United States) Bobby Riggs (3)	(United States) Gardnar Mulloy	6–4, 5–7, 4–6, 6–1, 7–5
1939	Chicago, Illinois	(United States) Frank Parker (2)	(United States) Gardnar Mulloy	6–3, 6–0, 5–7, 6–1
1940	Chicago, Illinois	(United States) Donald McNeill	(United States) Bobby Riggs	6–1, 6–4, 6–8, 6–3
1941	River Forest, Illinois	(United States) Frank Parker (3)	(United States) Bobby Riggs	6–3, 7–5, 6–8, 4–6, 6–3
1942	St. Louis, Missouri	(United States) Seymour Greenberg	(United States) Harris Everett	5–7, 7–5, 7–9, 7–5, 8–6
1943	Detroit, Michigan	(United States) Seymour Greenberg (2)	(United States) William Talbert	6–1, 4–6, 6–3, 6–3
1944	Detroit, Michigan	(Ecuador) Pancho Segura	(United States) William Talbert	6–3, 2–6, 7–5, 6–3
1945	Chicago, Illinois	(United States) William Talbert	(Ecuador) Pancho Segura	6–4, 4–6, 6–2, 2–6, 6–2
1946	River Forest, Illinois	(United States) Frank Parker (4)	(United States) William Talbert	6–4, 6–4, 6–2
1947	Salt Lake City, Utah	(United States) Frank Parker (5)	(United States) Ted Schroeder	8–6, 6–2, 6–4
1948	River Forest, Illinois	(United States) Pancho Gonzalez	(United States) Nick Carter	7–5, 6–2, 6–3
1949	River Forest, Illinois	(United States) Pancho Gonzalez (2)	(United States) Frank Parker	6–1, 3–6, 8–6, 6–3
1950	River Forest, Illinois	(United States) Herbert Flam	(United States) Ted Schroeder	6–1, 6–2, 6–2
1951	River Forest, Illinois	(United States) Tony Trabert	(United States) Arthur Larsen	6–8, 2–6, 6–4, 6–3, 8–6
1952	River Forest, Illinois	(United States) Arthur Larsen	(United States) Richard Savitt	4–6, 6–4, 6–2, 6–4
1953	River Forest, Illinois	(United States) Vic Seixas	(United States) Hamilton Richardson	6–2, 6–4, 6–3
1954	River Forest, Illinois	(United States) Bernard Bartzen	(United States) Tony Trabert	6–4, 4–6, 6–0, 6–2
1955	Atlanta, Georgia	(United States) Tony Trabert (2)	(United States) Bernard Bartzen	10–8, 6–1, 6–4
1956	River Forest, Illinois	(United States) Herbert Flam (2)	(United States) Edward Moylan	3–6, 6–3, 1–6, 6–3, 6–3
1957	River Forest, Illinois	(United States) Vic Seixas (2)	(United States) Herbert Flam	1–6, 8–6, 6–1, 6–3
1958	River Forest, Illinois	(United States) Bernard Bartzen	(United States) Sam Giammalva	3–6, 7–5, 6–2, 6–2
1959	River Forest, Illinois	(United States) Bernard Bartzen (2)	(United States) Whitney Reed	6–0, 8–6, 9–7
1960	River Forest, Illinois	(United States) Barry MacKay	(United States) Bernard Bartzen	4–6, 7–5, 6–4, 6–0
1961	River Forest, Illinois	(United States) Bernard Bartzen (3)	(United States) Donald Dell	6–1, 2–6, 6–2, 6–0
1962	Chicago, Illinois	(United States) Chuck McKinley	(Australia) Fred Stolle	6–3, 8–6, 6–4
1963	River Forest, Illinois	(United States) Chuck McKinley (2)	(United States) Dennis Ralston	6–2, 6–2, 6–4
1964	River Forest, Illinois	(United States) Dennis Ralston	(United States) Chuck McKinley	6–2, 6–2, 6–1
1965	River Forest, Illinois	(United States) Dennis Ralston (2)	(United States) Cliff Richey	6–4, 4–6, 6–4, 6–3
1966	Milwaukee, Wisconsin	(United States) Cliff Richey	(United States) Frank Froehling III	13–11, 6–1, 6–3
1967	Milwaukee, Wisconsin	(United States) Arthur Ashe	(United States) Marty Riessen	4–6, 6–3, 6–1, 7–5
1968	Milwaukee, Wisconsin	(United States) Clark Graebner	(United States) Stan Smith	6–3, 7–5, 6–0
↓ Open Era ↓
1969	Indianapolis, Indiana	(Socialist Federal Republic of Yugoslavia) Željko Franulović	(United States) Arthur Ashe	8–6, 6–3, 6–4
1970	Indianapolis, Indiana	(United States) Cliff Richey (2)	(United States) Stan Smith	6–2, 10–8, 3–6, 6–1
1971	Indianapolis, Indiana	(Socialist Federal Republic of Yugoslavia) Željko Franulović (2)	(United States) Cliff Richey	6–3, 6–4, 0–6, 6–3
1972	Indianapolis, Indiana	(South Africa) Bob Hewitt	(United States) Jimmy Connors	7–6, 6–1, 6–2
1973	Indianapolis, Indiana	(Spain) Manuel Orantes	(France) Georges Goven	6–4, 6–1, 6–4
1974	Indianapolis, Indiana	(United States) Jimmy Connors	(Sweden) Björn Borg	5–7, 6–3, 6–4
1975	Indianapolis, Indiana	(Spain) Manuel Orantes (2)	(United States) Arthur Ashe	6–2, 6–2
1976	Indianapolis, Indiana	(United States) Jimmy Connors (2)	(Poland) Wojtek Fibak	6–2, 6–4
1977	Indianapolis, Indiana	(Spain) Manuel Orantes (3)	(United States) Jimmy Connors	6–1, 6–3
1978	Indianapolis, Indiana	(United States) Jimmy Connors (3)	(Spain) José Higueras	7–5, 6–1
1979	Indianapolis, Indiana	(United States) Jimmy Connors (4)	(Argentina) Guillermo Vilas	6–1, 2–6, 6–4
1980	Indianapolis, Indiana	(Argentina) José Luis Clerc	(United States) Mel Purcell	7–5, 6–3
1981	Indianapolis, Indiana	(Argentina) José Luis Clerc (2)	(Czechoslovakia) Ivan Lendl	4–6, 6–4, 6–2
1982	Indianapolis, Indiana	(Spain) José Higueras	(United States) Jimmy Arias	7–5, 5–7, 6–3
1983	Indianapolis, Indiana	(United States) Jimmy Arias	(Ecuador) Andrés Gómez	6–4, 2–6, 6–4
1984	Indianapolis, Indiana	(Ecuador) Andrés Gómez	(Hungary) Balázs Taróczy	6–0, 7–6
1985	Indianapolis, Indiana	(Czechoslovakia) Ivan Lendl	(Ecuador) Andrés Gómez	6–1, 6–3
1986	Indianapolis, Indiana	(Ecuador) Andrés Gómez (2)	(France) Thierry Tulasne	6–4, 7–6
1987	Indianapolis, Indiana	(Sweden) Mats Wilander	(Sweden) Kent Carlsson	7–5, 6–3
1988	Charleston, South Carolina	(United States) Andre Agassi	(United States) Jimmy Arias	6–2, 6–2
1989	Charleston, South Carolina	(United States) Jay Berger	(United States) Lawson Duncan	6–4, 6–3
1990	Kiawah Island, South Carolina	(United States) David Wheaton	(South Africa) Mark Kaplan	6–4, 6–4
1991	Charlotte, North Carolina	(Peru) Jaime Yzaga	(United States) Jimmy Arias	6–3, 7–5
1992	Charlotte, North Carolina	(United States) MaliVai Washington	(Switzerland) Claudio Mezzadri	6–3, 6–3
1993	Charlotte, North Carolina	(Argentina) Horacio de la Peña	(Peru) Jaime Yzaga	3–6, 6–3, 6–4
1994	Birmingham, Alabama	(Australia) Jason Stoltenberg	(Argentina) Gabriel Markus	6–3, 6–4
1995	Pinehurst, North Carolina	(Sweden) Thomas Enqvist	(Argentina) Javier Frana	6–3, 3–6, 6–3
1996	Pinehurst, North Carolina	(Brazil) Fernando Meligeni	(Sweden) Mats Wilander	6–4, 6–2
1997	Orlando, Florida	(United States) Michael Chang	(South Africa) Grant Stafford	4–6, 6–2, 6–1
1998	Orlando, Florida	(United States) Jim Courier	(United States) Michael Chang	7–5, 3–6, 7–5
1999	Orlando, Florida	(Sweden) Magnus Norman	(Argentina) Guillermo Cañas	6–0, 6–3
2000	Orlando, Florida	(Chile) Fernando González	(Chile) Nicolás Massú	6–2, 6–3
2001	Houston, Texas	(United States) Andy Roddick	(South Korea) Hyung-Taik Lee	7–5, 6–3
2002	Houston, Texas	(United States) Andy Roddick (2)	(United States) Pete Sampras	7–6^{(11–9)}, 6–3
2003	Houston, Texas	(United States) Andre Agassi (2)	(United States) Andy Roddick	3–6, 6–3, 6–4
2004	Houston, Texas	(Germany) Tommy Haas	(United States) Andy Roddick	6–3, 6–4
2005	Houston, Texas	(United States) Andy Roddick (3)	(France) Sébastien Grosjean	6–2, 6–2
2006	Houston, Texas	(United States) Mardy Fish	(Austria) Jürgen Melzer	3–6, 6–4, 6–3
2007	Houston, Texas	(Croatia) Ivo Karlović	(Argentina) Mariano Zabaleta	6–4, 6–1
2008	Houston, Texas	(Spain) Marcel Granollers	(United States) James Blake	6–4, 1–6, 7–5
2009	Houston, Texas	(Australia) Lleyton Hewitt	(United States) Wayne Odesnik	6–2, 7–5
2010	Houston, Texas	(Argentina) Juan Ignacio Chela	(United States) Sam Querrey	5–7, 6–4, 6–3
2011	Houston, Texas	(United States) Ryan Sweeting	(Japan) Kei Nishikori	6–4, 7–6^{(7–3)}
2012	Houston, Texas	(Argentina) Juan Mónaco	(United States) John Isner	6–2, 3–6, 6–3
2013	Houston, Texas	(United States) John Isner	(Spain) Nicolás Almagro	6–3, 7–5
2014	Houston, Texas	(Spain) Fernando Verdasco	(Spain) Nicolás Almagro	6–3, 7–6^{(7–4)}
2015	Houston, Texas	(United States) Jack Sock	(United States) Sam Querrey	7–6^{(11–9)}, 7–6^{(7–2)}
2016	Houston, Texas	(Argentina) Juan Mónaco (2)	(United States) Jack Sock	3–6, 6–3, 7–5
2017	Houston, Texas	(United States) Steve Johnson	(Brazil) Thomaz Bellucci	6–4, 4–6, 7–6^{(7–5)}
2018	Houston, Texas	(United States) Steve Johnson (2)	(United States) Tennys Sandgren	7–6^{(7–2)}, 2–6, 6–4
2019	Houston, Texas	(Chile) Cristian Garín	(Norway) Casper Ruud	7–6^{(7–4)}, 4–6, 6–3
2020–2021	Houston, Texas	Not held due to COVID-19 pandemic		
2022	Houston, Texas	(United States) Reilly Opelka	(United States) John Isner	6–3, 7–6^{(9–7)}
2023	Houston, Texas	(United States) Frances Tiafoe	(Argentina) Tomás Martín Etcheverry	7–6^{(7–1)}, 7–6^{(8–6)}
2024	Houston, Texas	(United States) Ben Shelton	(United States) Frances Tiafoe	7–5, 4–6, 6–3
2025	Houston, Texas	(United States) Jenson Brooksby	(United States) Frances Tiafoe	6–4, 6–2
2026	Houston, Texas	(United States) Tommy Paul	(Argentina) Román Andrés Burruchaga	6–1, 3–6, 7–5

=== Doubles (open era) ===
Year	Champions	Runners-up	Score
1969	(Australia) Bill Bowrey (United States) Clark Graebner	(Australia) Dick Crealy (Australia) Allan Stone	6–4, 4–6, 6–4
1970	(United States) Arthur Ashe (United States) Clark Graebner	(Romania) Ilie Năstase (Romania) Ion Țiriac	2–6, 6–4, 6–4
1971	(Socialist Federal Republic of Yugoslavia) Željko Franulović (Czechoslovakia) Jan Kodeš	(United States) Clark Graebner (United States) Erik van Dillen	7–6, 5–7, 6–3
1972	(South Africa) Bob Hewitt (South Africa) Frew McMillan	(Chile) Patricio Cornejo (Chile) Jaime Fillol	6–2, 6–3
1973	(Australia) Bob Carmichael (South Africa) Frew McMillan	(Spain) Manuel Orantes (Romania) Ion Țiriac	6–3, 6–4
1974	(United States) Jimmy Connors (Romania) Ilie Năstase	(Germany) Jürgen Fassbender (Germany) Hans-Jürgen Pohmann	6–7, 6–3, 6–4
1975	(Spain) Juan Gisbert (Spain) Manuel Orantes	(Poland) Wojciech Fibak (Germany) Hans-Jürgen Pohmann	7–5, 6–0
1976	(United States) Brian Gottfried (Mexico) Raúl Ramírez	(United States) Fred McNair (United States) Sherwood Stewart	6–2, 6–2
1977	(Chile) Patricio Cornejo (Chile) Jaime Fillol	(United States) Dick Crealy (Australia) Cliff Letcher	6–7, 6–4, 6–3
1978	(United States) Gene Mayer (United States) Hank Pfister	(United States) Jeff Borowiak (New Zealand) Chris Lewis	6–3, 6–1
1979	(United States) Gene Mayer (United States) John McEnroe	(Czechoslovakia) Jan Kodeš (Czechoslovakia) Tomáš Šmíd	6–4, 7–6
1980	(United States) Kevin Curren (United States) Steve Denton	(Poland) Wojciech Fibak (Czechoslovakia) Ivan Lendl	3–6, 7–6, 6–4
1981	(United States) Kevin Curren (United States) Steve Denton	(Mexico) Raúl Ramírez (United States) Van Winitsky	6–3, 5–7, 7–5
1982	(United States) Sherwood Stewart (United States) Ferdi Taygan	(South Africa) Robbie Venter (United States) Blaine Willenborg	6–4, 7–5
1983	(Australia) Mark Edmondson (United States) Sherwood Stewart	(Brazil) Carlos Kirmayr (Brazil) Cássio Motta	6–3, 6–2
1984	(United States) Ken Flach (United States) Robert Seguso	(Switzerland) Heinz Günthardt (Hungary) Balázs Taróczy	7–6, 7–5
1985	(United States) Ken Flach (United States) Robert Seguso	(Czech Republic) Pavel Složil (Australia) Kim Warwick	6–4, 6–4
1986	(Ecuador) Andrés Gómez (Chile) Hans Gildemeister	(Australia) John Fitzgerald (United States) Sherwood Stewart	6–4, 6–3
1987	(Australia) Laurie Warder (United States) Blaine Willenborg	(Sweden) Joakim Nyström (Sweden) Mats Wilander	6–0, 6–3
1988	(South Africa) Pieter Aldrich (South Africa) Danie Visser	(Mexico) Jorge Lozano (United States) Todd Witsken	7–6, 6–3
1989	(Sweden) Mikael Pernfors (Sweden) Tobias Svantesson	(Mexico) Agustín Moreno (Peru) Jaime Yzaga	6–4, 4–6, 7–5
1990	(United States) Scott Davis (United States) David Pate	(United States) Jim Grabb (Mexico) Leonardo Lavalle	6–2, 6–3
1991	(United States) Rick Leach (United States) Jim Pugh	(United States) Bret Garnett (United States) Greg Van Emburgh	6–3, 2–6, 6–3
1992	(United States) Steve DeVries (Australia) David Macpherson	(United States) Bret Garnett (United States) Jared Palmer	6–4, 7–6
1993	(Sweden) Rikard Bergh (United States) Trevor Kronemann	(Argentina) Javier Frana (Mexico) Leonardo Lavalle	6–1, 6–2
1994	(Australia) Todd Woodbridge (Australia) Mark Woodforde	(United States) Jared Palmer (United States) Richey Reneberg	6–2, 3–6, 6–3
1995	(Australia) Mark Woodforde (Australia) Todd Woodbridge	(United States) Alex O'Brien (Australia) Sandon Stolle	6–2, 6–4
1996	(Australia) Pat Cash (Australia) Patrick Rafter	(United States) Ken Flach (United States) David Wheaton	6–2, 6–3
1997	(The Bahamas) Mark Merklein (United States) Vince Spadea	(United States) Alex O'Brien (United States) Jeff Salzenstein	6–4, 4–6, 6–4
1998	(South Africa) Grant Stafford (Zimbabwe) Kevin Ullyett	(Australia) Michael Tebbutt (Sweden) Mikael Tillström	4–6, 6–4, 7–5
1999	(United States) Jim Courier (Australia) Todd Woodbridge	(United States) Bob Bryan (United States) Mike Bryan	7–6^{(7–4)}, 6–4
2000	(India) Leander Paes (Netherlands) Jan Siemerink	(United States) Justin Gimelstob (Canada) Sébastien Lareau	6–3, 6–4
2001	(India) Mahesh Bhupathi (India) Leander Paes	(United States) Kevin Kim (United States) Jim Thomas	7–6^{(7–4)}, 6–2
2002	(United States) Mardy Fish (United States) Andy Roddick	(United States) Jan-Michael Gambill (United States) Graydon Oliver	6–4, 6–4
2003	(The Bahamas) Mark Knowles (Canada) Daniel Nestor	(United States) Jan-Michael Gambill (United States) Graydon Oliver	6–4, 6–3
2004	(United States) Richey Reneberg (South Africa) Christo van Rensburg	(United States) Brian MacPhie (United States) David Witt	2–6, 6–3, 6–2
2005	(The Bahamas) Mark Knowles (Canada) Daniel Nestor	(Argentina) Martín García (Peru) Luis Horna	6–3, 6–4
2006	(Germany) Michael Kohlmann (Germany) Alexander Waske	(Austria) Julian Knowle (Austria) Jürgen Melzer	5–7, 6–4, 10–5
2007	(United States) Bob Bryan (United States) Mike Bryan	(The Bahamas) Mark Knowles (Canada) Daniel Nestor	7–6^{(7–3)}, 6–4
2008	(Latvia) Ernests Gulbis (Germany) Rainer Schüttler	(Uruguay) Pablo Cuevas (Spain) Marcel Granollers	7–5, 7–6^{(7–3)}
2009	(United States) Bob Bryan (United States) Mike Bryan	(United States) Jesse Levine (United States) Ryan Sweeting	6–1, 6–2
2010	(United States) Bob Bryan (United States) Mike Bryan	(Australia) Stephen Huss (South Africa) Wesley Moodie	6–3, 7–5
2011	(United States) Bob Bryan (United States) Mike Bryan	(United States) John Isner (United States) Sam Querrey	6–7, 6–2, [10–5]
2012	(United States) James Blake (United States) Sam Querrey	(Philippines) Treat Conrad Huey (United Kingdom) Dominic Inglot	7–6^{(16–14)}, 6–4
2013	(United Kingdom) Jamie Murray (Australia) John Peers	(United States) Bob Bryan (United States) Mike Bryan	1–6, 7–6^{(7–3)}, [12–10]
2014	(United States) Bob Bryan (United States) Mike Bryan	(Spain) David Marrero (Spain) Fernando Verdasco	4–6, 6–4, [11–9]
2015	(Lithuania) Ričardas Berankis (Russia) Teymuraz Gabashvili	(Philippines) Treat Huey (United States) Scott Lipsky	6–4, 6–4
2016	(United States) Bob Bryan (United States) Mike Bryan	(Dominican Republic) Víctor Estrella Burgos (Mexico) Santiago González	4–6, 6–3, [10–8]
2017	(Chile) Julio Peralta (Argentina) Horacio Zeballos	(Germany) Dustin Brown (United States) Frances Tiafoe	4–6, 7–5, [10–6]
2018	(Belarus) Max Mirnyi (Austria) Philipp Oswald	(Germany) Andre Begemann (Croatia) Antonio Šančić	6–7^{(2–7)}, 6–4, [11–9]
2019	(Mexico) Santiago González (Pakistan) Aisam-ul-Haq Qureshi	(United Kingdom) Ken Skupski (United Kingdom) Neal Skupski	3–6, 6–4, [10–6]
2020–2021	Not held due to COVID-19 pandemic		
2022	(Australia) Matthew Ebden (Australia) Max Purcell	(Serbia) Ivan Sabanov (Serbia) Matej Sabanov	6–3, 6–3
2023	(Australia) Max Purcell (Australia) Jordan Thompson	(United Kingdom) Julian Cash (United Kingdom) Henry Patten	4–6, 6–4, [10–5]
2024	(Australia) Max Purcell (Australia) Jordan Thompson	(United States) William Blumberg (Australia) John Peers	7–5, 6–1
2025	(Brazil) Fernando Romboli (Australia) John-Patrick Smith	(Argentina) Federico Agustín Gómez (Mexico) Santiago González	6–1, 6–4
2026	(Ecuador) Andrés Andrade (United States) Ben Shelton	(Brazil) Orlando Luz (Brazil) Rafael Matos	4–6, 6–3, [10–6]

== Records ==
=== Men's singles ===
Most titles	(United States) Bill Tilden	7
Most finals	(United States) Bill Tilden (United States) Frank Parker	8
Most consecutive titles	(United States) Bill Tilden (1922-1927)	6
Most consecutive finals	(United States) Bill Tilden (1922-1927)	6
Title with the least games lost	(United States) Andre Agassi	23 (2003)
Most matches played	(United States) Tut Bartzen	64
Most matches won	(United States) Frank Parker	56
Most consecutive matches won	(United States) Bill Tilden	36
Most editions played	(United States) Seymour Greenberg	16
Most editions played	(United States) Grant Golden	16
Best winning %	(United States) Bill Tilden	97.96%
Youngest champion	(United States) Frank Parker	17y, 5m, 3d (1933)
Oldest champion	(United States) Samuel Hardy	40y, 7m, 18d (1917)

Longest final
1942 (66 games)
(United States) Seymour Greenberg	5	7	7	7	8
(United States) Harris Everett	7	5	9	5	6

Shortest final
1999 (15 games)
(Sweden) Magnus Norman	6	6
(Argentina) Guillermo Cañas	0	3

Source: The Tennisbase

== See also ==
- Charleston Open – WTA clay court event held in the United States
- U.S. Women's Clay Court Championships
- River Oaks International Tennis Tournament

== Sources ==
- References used for the Pre-Open Era locations and champions: United States Lawn Tennis Association Yearbook (1942–'44, '48–49, '51, '53. '55–56, '60, '64, '66 & '69), Spalding Lawn Tennis Annual (1916, '24–'28, '30–'31 & '39), Wright & Ditson's Lawn Tennis Annual (1911–'14, 1921, 1932–'33, '35 & '37), New York Times articles (1910–'14, '16, '18–'19 & '21–'22), From Club Court to Center Court by Phillip S. Smith (2007 Edition, page 67).

Awards and achievements
Preceded by Båstad	ATP International Series Tournament of the Year; 2003, 2004 (shared with Båstad)	Succeeded by Båstad
