= 1993 Swiss Indoors – Doubles =

Doubles
- 1993 Swiss Indoors

Final
- Champions: (Zimbabwe) Byron Black (United States) Jonathan Stark
- Runners-up: (United States) Brad Pearce (United States) Dave Randall
- Score: 3–6, 7–5, 6–3

Details
- Draw: 16 (2WC/1Q)
- Seeds: 4

Events
Singles	Doubles
← 1992 ·	Swiss Indoors	· 1994 →

Tom Nijssen and Cyril Suk were the defending champions, but lost in the first round to Shelby Cannon and Scott Melville.

Byron Black and Jonathan Stark won the title by defeating Brad Pearce and Dave Randall 3–6, 7–5, 6–3 in the final.

== Seeds ==
1. (United States) Luke Jensen / (United States) Murphy Jensen (quarterfinals)
2. (Netherlands) Tom Nijssen / (Czech Republic) Cyril Suk (first round)
3. (South Africa) David Adams / (Russia) Andrei Olhovskiy (first round)
4. (United States) Steve DeVries / (Australia) David Macpherson (quarterfinals)

== Draw ==
=== Key ===
- Q = Qualifier
- WC = Wild card
- LL = Lucky loser
- Alt = Alternate
- SE = Special exempt
- PR = Protected ranking
- ITF = ITF entry
- JE = Junior exempt
- w/o = Walkover
- r = Retired
- d = Defaulted
- SR = Special ranking

=== Draw ===
First round
1	(United States) L Jensen (United States) M Jensen	7	7
(Netherlands) M Oosting (Netherlands) J Siemerink	5	5
WC	(Switzerland) J Hlasek (Switzerland) M Rosset	6	3
(Zimbabwe) B Black (United States) J Stark	7	6
3	(South Africa) D Adams (Russia) A Olhovskiy	4	7	6
(Czech Republic) M Damm (Sweden) A Järryd	6	5	7
(South Africa) JL de Jager (South Africa) M Ondruska	6	4
(Netherlands) HJ Davids (South Africa) P Norval	7	6
(United States) M Keil (South Africa) S Kruger	2	4
(United States) B Pearce (United States) D Randall	6	6
(South Africa) G Muller (South Africa) D Visser	6	6	2
4	(United States) S DeVries (Australia) D Macpherson	2	7	6
Q	(Germany) P Baur (Germany) D Prinosil	6	6
WC	(Germany) MK Goellner (Germany) C Saceanu	2	4
(United States) S Cannon (United States) S Melville	7	7
2	(Netherlands) T Nijssen (Czech Republic) C Suk	6	6

Quarterfinals
1	(United States) L Jensen (United States) M Jensen	7	3	6
(Zimbabwe) B Black (United States) J Stark	5	6	7
(Czech Republic) M Damm (Sweden) A Järryd	6	6	6
(Netherlands) HJ Davids (South Africa) P Norval	4	7	1
(United States) B Pearce (United States) D Randall	6	6
4	(United States) S DeVries (Australia) D Macpherson	3	3
Q	(Germany) P Baur (Germany) D Prinosil	2	3
(United States) S Cannon (United States) S Melville	6	6

Semifinals
(Zimbabwe) B Black (United States) J Stark	6	6	7
(Czech Republic) M Damm (Sweden) A Järryd	2	7	5
(United States) B Pearce (United States) D Randall	4	6	6
(United States) S Cannon (United States) S Melville	6	2	3

Final
(Zimbabwe) B Black (United States) J Stark	3	7	6
(United States) B Pearce (United States) D Randall	6	5	3
