= 1993 Swiss Indoors – Singles =

Singles
- 1993 Swiss Indoors

Final
- Champion: (Germany) Michael Stich
- Runner-up: (Sweden) Stefan Edberg
- Score: 6–4, 6–7^{(5–7)}, 6–3, 6–2

Details
- Draw: 32 (3WC/4Q)
- Seeds: 8

Events
Singles	Doubles
← 1992 ·	Swiss Indoors	· 1994 →

Boris Becker was the defending champion, but did not compete this year.

Michael Stich won the title by defeating Stefan Edberg 6–4, 6–7^{(5–7)}, 6–3, 6–2 in the final.

== Seeds ==
1. (Sweden) Stefan Edberg (final)
2. (Germany) Michael Stich (champion)
3. (Russia) Alexander Volkov (first round)
4. (United States) Ivan Lendl (first round)
5. (Switzerland) Marc Rosset (semifinals)
6. (France) Arnaud Boetsch (quarterfinals)
7. (Israel) Amos Mansdorf (quarterfinals)
8. (Germany) Marc-Kevin Goellner (second round)

== Draw ==
=== Key ===
- Q = Qualifier
- WC = Wild card
- LL = Lucky loser
- Alt = Alternate
- SE = Special exempt
- PR = Protected ranking
- ITF = ITF entry
- JE = Junior exempt
- w/o = Walkover
- r = Retired
- d = Defaulted
- SR = Special ranking

=== Finals ===
Semifinals
1	(Sweden) Stefan Edberg	6	7^{7}
5	(Switzerland) Marc Rosset	4	6^{5}
Q	(Czech Republic) Martin Damm	6^{6}	4
2/WC	(Germany) Michael Stich	7^{8}	6

Final
1	(Sweden) Stefan Edberg	4	7^{7}	3	2
2/WC	(Germany) Michael Stich	6	6^{5}	6	6

=== Top half ===
First round
1	(Sweden) S Edberg	6	7^{7}
(Sweden) C Bergström	2	6^{3}
Q	(Germany) J Renzenbrink	3	6	7
(South Africa) M Ondruska	6	3	5
(Denmark) K Carlsen	5	3
(France) G Raoux	7	6
Q	(Germany) A Thoms	3	2
7	(Israel) A Mansdorf	6	6
3	(Russia) A Volkov	2	6^{5}
(Germany) D Prinosil	6	7^{7}
(France) S Simian	6	2	5
(Italy) G Pozzi	3	6	7
WC	(Sweden) T Enqvist	7	6
(Morocco) Y El Aynaoui	5	1
(Russia) A Cherkasov	0	2
5	(Switzerland) M Rosset	6	6

Second round
1	(Sweden) S Edberg	3	6	6
Q	(Germany) J Renzenbrink	6	3	1
(France) G Raoux	6^{2}	2
7	(Israel) A Mansdorf	7^{7}	6
(Germany) D Prinosil	7^{9}	6
(Italy) G Pozzi	6^{7}	2
WC	(Sweden) T Enqvist	2	3
5	(Switzerland) M Rosset	6	6

Quarterfinals
1	(Sweden) S Edberg	7^{7}	1	6
7	(Israel) A Mansdorf	6^{4}	6	4
(Germany) D Prinosil	6^{4}	4
5	(Switzerland) M Rosset	7^{7}	6

Semifinals
1	(Sweden) S Edberg	6	7^{7}
5	(Switzerland) M Rosset	4	6^{5}

=== Bottom half ===
First round
6	(France) A Boetsch	7^{7}	6
(United States) J Stark	6^{4}	3
(United States) J Tarango	6	6
(Russia) A Olhovskiy	4	2
Q	(Czech Republic) M Damm	7^{7}	6
(Sweden) A Järryd	6^{3}	4
(Netherlands) J Siemerink	7	7^{7}
4	(United States) I Lendl	5	6^{5}
8	(Germany) MK Goellner	7	6
(Switzerland) J Hlasek	5	3
(Sweden) M Larsson	6	6
(Sweden) N Kulti	1	2
Q	(France) R Gilbert	7	6
WC	(Switzerland) C Mezzadri	5	2
(France) F Santoro	5	2
2/WC	(Germany) M Stich	7	6

Second round
6	(France) A Boetsch	6	6
(United States) J Tarango	0	1
Q	(Czech Republic) M Damm	6	4	7
(Netherlands) J Siemerink	4	6	5
8	(Germany) MK Goellner	6	6^{1}	4
(Sweden) M Larsson	3	7^{7}	6
Q	(France) R Gilbert	4	6^{5}
2/WC	(Germany) M Stich	6	7^{7}

Quarterfinals
6	(France) A Boetsch	6	4	6^{6}
Q	(Czech Republic) M Damm	3	6	7^{8}
(Sweden) M Larsson	2	1
2/WC	(Germany) M Stich	6	6

Semifinals
Q	(Czech Republic) M Damm	6^{6}	4
2/WC	(Germany) M Stich	7^{8}	6
