= 1991 Swiss Indoors – Doubles =

Doubles
- 1991 Swiss Indoors

Final
- Champions: (Switzerland) Jakob Hlasek (United States) Patrick McEnroe
- Runners-up: (Czechoslovakia) Petr Korda (United States) John McEnroe
- Score: 3–6, 7–6, 7–6

Details
- Draw: 16 (1Q)
- Seeds: 4

Events
Singles	Doubles
← 1990 ·	Swiss Indoors	· 1992 →

Stefan Kruger and Christo van Rensburg were the defending champions, but van Rensburg did not compete this year. Kruger teamed up with Neil Broad and lost in the semifinals to Petr Korda and John McEnroe.

Jakob Hlasek and Patrick McEnroe won the title by defeating Korda and John McEnroe 3–6, 7–6, 7–6 in the final.

== Seeds ==
1. (Switzerland) Jakob Hlasek / (United States) Patrick McEnroe (champions)
2. (Netherlands) Hendrik Jan Davids / (Netherlands) Paul Haarhuis (first round)
3. (Netherlands) Tom Nijssen / (Czechoslovakia) Cyril Suk (first round)
4. (United Kingdom) Neil Broad / (South Africa) Stefan Kruger (semifinals)

== Draw ==
=== Key ===
- Q = Qualifier
- WC = Wild card
- LL = Lucky loser
- Alt = Alternate
- ITF = ITF entry
- PR = Protected ranking
- SR = Special ranking
- SE = Special exempt
- JE = Junior exempt
- JR = Junior Accelerator Programme entrant
- CO = College Accelerator Programme entrant
- NG = Next Gen Accelerator Program entrant
- w/o = Walkover
- r = Retired
- d = Defaulted

=== Draw ===
First round
1	(Switzerland) J Hlasek (United States) P McEnroe	6	6
(Sweden) D Engel (Sweden) J Gunnarsson	2	0
(United Kingdom) J Bates (United States) K Curren	7	4	6
Q	(Latvia) Ģ Dzelde (Germany) A Mronz	6	6	4
3	(Netherlands) T Nijssen (Czechoslovakia) C Suk	6	6	3
(Czechoslovakia) L Pimek (Kenya) P Wekesa	4	7	6
(Mexico) J Lozano (Argentina) G Luza	6	3	4
(United States) J Brown (United States) S Melville	4	6	6
(United States) C Beckman (United States) S Salumaa	6	7
(Spain) T Carbonell (Australia) D Macpherson	2	6
(Venezuela) A Mora (South Africa) B Talbot	4	6
4	(United Kingdom) N Broad (South Africa) S Kruger	6	7
(Iran) M Bahrami (France) O Delaître	3	6	6
(Netherlands) M Schapers (Czechoslovakia) D Vacek	6	4	3
(Czechoslovakia) P Korda (United States) J McEnroe	6	6
2	(Netherlands) HJ Davids (Netherlands) P Haarhuis	1	2

Quarterfinals
1	(Switzerland) J Hlasek (United States) P McEnroe	6	6	7
(United Kingdom) J Bates (United States) K Curren	7	4	5
(Czechoslovakia) L Pimek (Kenya) P Wekesa	1	7	3
(United States) J Brown (United States) S Melville	6	6	6
(United States) C Beckman (United States) S Salumaa	6	7	6
4	(United Kingdom) N Broad (South Africa) S Kruger	7	6	7
(Iran) M Bahrami (France) O Delaître	3	4
(Czechoslovakia) P Korda (United States) J McEnroe	6	6

Semifinals
1	(Switzerland) J Hlasek (United States) P McEnroe	6	6
(United States) J Brown (United States) S Melville	2	4
4	(United Kingdom) N Broad (South Africa) S Kruger	6	5	6
(Czechoslovakia) P Korda (United States) J McEnroe	4	7	7

Final
1	(Switzerland) J Hlasek (United States) P McEnroe	3	7	7
(Czechoslovakia) P Korda (United States) J McEnroe	6	6	6
