= 1990 Swiss Indoors – Singles =

Singles
- 1990 Swiss Indoors

Final
- Champion: (United States) John McEnroe
- Runner-up: (Socialist Federal Republic of Yugoslavia) Goran Ivanišević
- Score: 6–7^{(4–7)}, 4–6, 7–6^{(7–3)}, 6–3, 6–4

Details
- Draw: 32 (3WC/4Q)
- Seeds: 8

Events
Singles	Doubles
← 1989 ·	Swiss Indoors	· 1991 →

Jim Courier was the defending champion, but lost in the second round to Andrei Cherkasov.

Third-seeded John McEnroe won the title by defeating Goran Ivanišević 6–7^{(4–7)}, 4–6, 7–6^{(7–3)}, 6–3, 6–4 in the final.

== Seeds ==
1. (Ecuador) Andrés Gómez (first round)
2. (Socialist Federal Republic of Yugoslavia) Goran Ivanišević (final)
3. (United States) John McEnroe (champion)
4. (Soviet Union) Andrei Chesnokov (second round)
5. (United States) Jim Courier (second round)
6. (Sweden) Magnus Gustafsson (quarterfinals)
7. (Czechoslovakia) Karel Nováček (second round)
8. (Switzerland) Marc Rosset (first round)

== Draw ==
=== Key ===
- Q = Qualifier
- WC = Wild card
- LL = Lucky loser
- Alt = Alternate
- SE = Special exempt
- PR = Protected ranking
- ITF = ITF entry
- JE = Junior exempt
- w/o = Walkover
- r = Retired
- d = Defaulted
- SR = Special ranking

=== Finals ===
Semifinals
Q	(United States) Scott Melville	2	6	3
3	(United States) John McEnroe	6	2	6
(Finland) Veli Paloheimo	2	4
2/WC	(Socialist Federal Republic of Yugoslavia) Goran Ivanišević	6	6

Final
3	(United States) John McEnroe	6^{4}	4	7^{7}	6	6
2/WC	(Socialist Federal Republic of Yugoslavia) Goran Ivanišević	7^{7}	6	6^{3}	3	4

=== Top half ===
First round
1	(Ecuador) A Gómez	6	6
(France) JP Fleurian	7	7
Q	(United States) S Melville	7	6
Q	(West Germany) F Dennhardt	5	4
(Finland) A Rahunen	6	6	4
(France) Y Noah	4	7	6
WC	(Iran) M Bahrami	6	5	7
8	(Switzerland) M Rosset	1	7	6
3	(United States) J McEnroe	6	6
(Czechoslovakia) M Šrejber	4	3
WC	(Sweden) N Kulti	6	6
Q	(Sweden) C Bergström	4	4
(Sweden) M Larsson	4	1
(Soviet Union) A Cherkasov	6	6
(Israel) A Mansdorf	6	0
5	(United States) J Courier	7	6

Second round
(France) JP Fleurian	4	6
Q	(United States) S Melville	6	7
(France) Y Noah	6	6
WC	(Iran) M Bahrami	3	3
3	(United States) J McEnroe	6	6
WC	(Sweden) N Kulti	1	2
(Soviet Union) A Cherkasov	3	6	6
5	(United States) J Courier	6	2	3

Quarterfinals
Q	(United States) S Melville	7	6	6
(France) Y Noah	6	7	4
3	(United States) J McEnroe	6	7
(Soviet Union) A Cherkasov	3	5

Semifinals
Q	(United States) S Melville	2	6	3
3	(United States) J McEnroe	6	2	6

=== Bottom half ===
First round
6	(Sweden) M Gustafsson	6	4	6
(Haiti) R Agénor	1	6	3
Q	(Sweden) J Gunnarsson	4	6	4
(Brazil) L Mattar	6	4	6
(Uruguay) M Filippini	2	7	3
(Finland) V Paloheimo	6	5	6
(South Africa) G Muller	4	6
4	(Soviet Union) A Chesnokov	6	7
7	(Czechoslovakia) K Nováček	6	7
(South Africa) C van Rensburg	0	5
(United States) J Connors	6	3
(West Germany) M Stich	7	6
(Czechoslovakia) P Korda	7	3	6
(Peru) J Yzaga	6	6	3
(Soviet Union) A Volkov	6	1
2/WC	(Socialist Federal Republic of Yugoslavia) G Ivanišević	7	6

Second round
6	(Sweden) M Gustafsson	6	7	6
(Brazil) L Mattar	7	6	4
(Finland) V Paloheimo	2	6	7
4	(Soviet Union) A Chesnokov	6	2	5
7	(Czechoslovakia) K Nováček	2	3
(West Germany) M Stich	6	6
(Czechoslovakia) P Korda	1	2
2/WC	(Socialist Federal Republic of Yugoslavia) G Ivanišević	6	6

Quarterfinals
6	(Sweden) M Gustafsson	6	4
(Finland) V Paloheimo	7	6
(West Germany) M Stich	6	6
2/WC	(Socialist Federal Republic of Yugoslavia) G Ivanišević	7	7

Semifinals
(Finland) V Paloheimo	2	4
2/WC	(Socialist Federal Republic of Yugoslavia) G Ivanišević	6	6
