= 1990 Swiss Indoors – Doubles =

Doubles
- 1990 Swiss Indoors

Final
- Champions: (South Africa) Stefan Kruger (South Africa) Christo van Rensburg
- Runners-up: (United Kingdom) Neil Broad (South Africa) Gary Muller
- Score: 4–6, 7–6, 6–3

Details
- Draw: 16 (1WC/1Q)
- Seeds: 4

Events
Singles	Doubles
← 1989 ·	Swiss Indoors	· 1991 →

Udo Riglewski and Michael Stich were the defending champions, but lost in the quarterfinals to Jim Courier and Patrick Galbraith.

Stefan Kruger and Christo van Rensburg won the title by defeating Neil Broad and Gary Muller 4–6, 7–6, 6–3 in the final.

== Seeds ==
1. (West Germany) Udo Riglewski / (West Germany) Michael Stich (quarterfinals)
2. (Socialist Federal Republic of Yugoslavia) Goran Ivanišević / (Czechoslovakia) Petr Korda (quarterfinals)
3. (United Kingdom) Neil Broad / (United Kingdom) Gary Muller (final)
4. (Argentina) Gustavo Luza / (Czechoslovakia) Tomáš Šmíd (semifinals)

== Draw ==
=== Key ===
- Q = Qualifier
- WC = Wild card
- LL = Lucky loser
- Alt = Alternate
- ITF = ITF entry
- PR = Protected ranking
- SR = Special ranking
- SE = Special exempt
- JE = Junior exempt
- JR = Junior Accelerator Programme entrant
- CO = College Accelerator Programme entrant
- NG = Next Gen Accelerator Program entrant
- w/o = Walkover
- r = Retired
- d = Defaulted

=== Draw ===
First round
1	(West Germany) U Riglewski (West Germany) M Stich	6	6
WC	(Brazil) L Mattar (Switzerland) M Rosset	2	2
(Sweden) J Gunnarsson (Venezuela) N Pereira	5	6
(United States) J Courier (United States) P Galbraith	7	7
3	(United Kingdom) N Broad (South Africa) G Muller	7	3	6
(Czechoslovakia) V Flégl (France) JP Fleurian	6	6	1
(United States) J Brown (United States) S Melville	5	4
(United States) S DeVries (Australia) D Macpherson	7	6
(Czechoslovakia) K Nováček (Czechoslovakia) M Šrejber	6	7
(Italy) C Caratti (Italy) D Nargiso	2	5
Q	(West Germany) P Baur (South Africa) R Deppe	3	6	6
4	(Argentina) G Luza (Czechoslovakia) T Šmíd	6	4	7
(United States) C Beckman (United States) L Jensen	1	4
(South Africa) S Kruger (South Africa) C van Rensburg	6	6
(Iran) M Bahrami (Czechoslovakia) L Pimek	4	7	6
2	(Socialist Federal Republic of Yugoslavia) G Ivanišević (Czechoslovakia) P Korda	6	6	7

Quarterfinals
1	(West Germany) U Riglewski (West Germany) M Stich	6	3
(United States) J Courier (United States) P Galbraith	7	6
3	(United Kingdom) N Broad (South Africa) G Muller	6	7
(United States) S DeVries (Australia) D Macpherson	4	5
(Czechoslovakia) K Nováček (Czechoslovakia) M Šrejber	3	6
4	(Argentina) G Luza (Czechoslovakia) T Šmíd	6	7
(South Africa) S Kruger (South Africa) C van Rensburg	6	6
2	(Socialist Federal Republic of Yugoslavia) G Ivanišević (Czechoslovakia) P Korda	4	3

Semifinals
(United States) J Courier (United States) P Galbraith	4	7	3
3	(United Kingdom) N Broad (South Africa) G Muller	6	6	6
4	(Argentina) G Luza (Czechoslovakia) T Šmíd	6	2	2
(South Africa) S Kruger (South Africa) C van Rensburg	4	6	6

Final
3	(United Kingdom) N Broad (South Africa) G Muller	6	6	3
(South Africa) S Kruger (South Africa) C van Rensburg	4	7	6
