= 1989 Swiss Indoors – Doubles =

Doubles
- 1989 Swiss Indoors

Final
- Champions: (West Germany) Udo Riglewski (West Germany) Michael Stich
- Runners-up: (Italy) Omar Camporese (Switzerland) Claudio Mezzadri
- Score: 6–3, 4–6, 6–0

Details
- Draw: 16
- Seeds: 4

Events
Singles	Doubles
← 1988 ·	Swiss Indoors	· 1990 →

Jakob Hlasek and Tomáš Šmíd were the defending champions but Hlasek did not compete this year, as he decided to focus on the singles tournament. Šmíd teamed up with Jan Gunnarsson and lost in the first round to tournament runners-up Omar Camporese and Claudio Mezzadri.

Udo Riglewski and Michael Stich won the title by defeating Camporese and Mezzadri 6–3, 4–6, 6–0 in the final.

== Seeds ==
1. (United States) Jim Courier / (Socialist Federal Republic of Yugoslavia) Goran Ivanišević (quarterfinals)
2. (Peru) Carlos di Laura / (Uruguay) Marcelo Filippini (quarterfinals)
3. (Iran) Mansour Bahrami / (France) Éric Winogradsky (first round)
4. (Austria) Alex Antonitsch / (Hungary) Balázs Taróczy (semifinals)

== Draw ==
=== Key ===
- Q = Qualifier
- WC = Wild card
- LL = Lucky loser
- Alt = Alternate
- SE = Special exempt
- PR = Protected ranking
- ITF = ITF entry
- JE = Junior exempt
- w/o = Walkover
- r = Retired
- d = Defaulted
- SR = Special ranking

=== Draw ===
First round
1	(United States) J Courier (Socialist Federal Republic of Yugoslavia) G Ivanišević	6	7
(West Germany) P Baur (Italy) U Colombini	3	6
(Netherlands) M Schapers (Czechoslovakia) M Šrejber	3	4
(West Germany) U Riglewski (West Germany) M Stich	6	6
4	(Austria) A Antonitsch (Hungary) B Taróczy	6	3	6
(United Kingdom) J Bates (Sweden) P Lundgren	4	6	3
(France) O Delaître (Canada) M Laurendeau	5	3
(Sweden) M Gustafsson (United States) T Nelson	7	6
(Switzerland) H Günthardt (Switzerland) M Rosset	5	6
(Sweden) D Engel (Sweden) F Nilsson	7	7
(Soviet Union) Ģ Dzelde (Soviet Union) A Volkov	7	6
3	(Iran) M Bahrami (France) É Winogradsky	5	3
(Sweden) J Gunnarsson (Czechoslovakia) T Šmíd	7	3	3
(Italy) O Camporese (Switzerland) C Mezzadri	6	6	6
(Sweden) S Edberg (Sweden) P Svensson	5	2
2	(Peru) C di Laura (Uruguay) M Filippini	7	6

Quarterfinals
1	(United States) J Courier (Socialist Federal Republic of Yugoslavia) G Ivanišević	4	7	2
(West Germany) U Riglewski (West Germany) M Stich	6	6	6
4	(Austria) A Antonitsch (Hungary) B Taróczy	6	6	6
(Sweden) M Gustafsson (United States) T Nelson	7	3	3
(Sweden) D Engel (Sweden) F Nilsson	6	3	6
(Soviet Union) Ģ Dzelde (Soviet Union) A Volkov	4	6	3
(Italy) O Camporese (Switzerland) C Mezzadri	6	6
2	(Peru) C di Laura (Uruguay) M Filippini	2	2

Semifinals
(West Germany) U Riglewski (West Germany) M Stich	6	7
4	(Austria) A Antonitsch (Hungary) B Taróczy	3	6
(Sweden) D Engel (Sweden) F Nilsson	6	6	2
(Italy) O Camporese (Switzerland) C Mezzadri	1	7	6

Final
(West Germany) U Riglewski (West Germany) M Stich	6	4	6
(Italy) O Camporese (Switzerland) C Mezzadri	3	6	0
