= 1990 Swiss Indoors =

- Date: 24–30 September
- Edition: 21st
- Category: World Series
- Draw: 32S / 16D
- Prize money: $450,000
- Surface: Hard / indoor
- Location: Basel, Switzerland
- Venue: St. Jakobshalle

Champions

Singles
- (United States) John McEnroe

Doubles
- (South Africa) Stefan Kruger (South Africa) Christo van Rensburg
- Swiss Indoors

The 1990 Swiss Indoors was a men's tennis tournament played on indoor hard courts at the St. Jakobshalle in Basel, Switzerland that was part of the World Series of the 1990 ATP Tour. It was the 21st edition of the tournament and took place from 24 September until 30 September 1990. Third-seeded John McEnroe won the singles title.

== Finals ==
=== Singles ===
(United States) John McEnroe defeated (Socialist Federal Republic of Yugoslavia) Goran Ivanišević 6–7^{(4–7)}, 4–6, 7–6^{(7–3)}, 6–3, 6–4

- It was McEnroe's 1st singles title of the year and the 76th of his career.

=== Doubles ===
(South Africa) Stefan Kruger / (South Africa) Christo van Rensburg defeated (United Kingdom) Neil Broad / (South Africa) Gary Muller 4–6, 7–6, 6–3
