= 1994 Swiss Indoors – Doubles =

Doubles
- 1994 Swiss Indoors

Final
- Champions: (United States) Patrick McEnroe (United States) Jared Palmer
- Runners-up: (South Africa) Lan Bale (South Africa) John-Laffnie de Jager
- Score: 6–3, 7–6

Details
- Draw: 16 (3WC/1Q)
- Seeds: 4

Events
Singles	Doubles
- Swiss Indoors

Byron Black and Jonathan Stark were the defending champions, but none competed this year.

Patrick McEnroe and Jared Palmer won the title by defeating Lan Bale and John-Laffnie de Jager 6–3, 7–6 in the final.

== Seeds ==
1. (United States) Patrick McEnroe / (United States) Jared Palmer (champions)
2. (Netherlands) Tom Nijssen / (Czech Republic) Cyril Suk (first round)
3. (Russia) Yevgeny Kafelnikov / (Czech Republic) David Rikl (quarterfinals)
4. (United States) Scott Melville / (South Africa) Piet Norval (first round)

== Draw ==
Key

- Q = Qualifier
- WC = Wild card
- LL = Lucky loser
- Alt = Alternate
- ITF = ITF entry
- PR = Protected ranking
- SR = Special ranking
- SE = Special exempt
- JE = Junior exempt
- JR = Junior Accelerator Programme entrant
- CO = College Accelerator Programme entrant
- NG = Next Gen Accelerator Program entrant
- w/o = Walkover
- r = Retired
- d = Defaulted

=== Draw ===
First round
1	(United States) P McEnroe (United States) J Palmer	6	7	7
(Czech Republic) M Damm (Germany) MK Goellner	7	5	6
WC	(Germany) D Prinosil (Germany) U Riglewski	4	7	6
Q	(United States) G Grant (United States) M Zimmerman	6	5	3
3	(Russia) Y Kafelnikov (Czech Republic) D Rikl	4	6	7
(South Africa) G Muller (South Africa) D Visser	6	1	5
(United States) M Bauer (United States) D Randall	2	3
(Netherlands) HJ Davids (Netherlands) J Siemerink	6	6
(Sweden) A Järryd (Sweden) M Larsson	6	7	2
(Mexico) J Lozano (United States) B Pearce	7	6	6
(South Africa) L Bale (South Africa) JL de Jager	7	6
4	(United States) S Melville (South Africa) P Norval	6	3
WC	(France) G Forget (Switzerland) M Rosset	6	6
WC	(Iran) M Bahrami (France) R Gilbert	2	4
(Netherlands) M Oosting (Czech Republic) D Vacek	6	7
2	(Netherlands) T Nijssen (Czech Republic) C Suk	3	6

Quarterfinals
1	(United States) P McEnroe (United States) J Palmer	6	7
WC	(Germany) D Prinosil (Germany) U Riglewski	1	6
3	(Russia) Y Kafelnikov (Czech Republic) D Rikl	3	4
(Netherlands) HJ Davids (Netherlands) J Siemerink	6	6
(Mexico) J Lozano (United States) B Pearce	5	7	3
(South Africa) L Bale (South Africa) JL de Jager	7	6	6
WC	(France) G Forget (Switzerland) M Rosset	6	6
(Netherlands) M Oosting (Czech Republic) D Vacek	7	7

Semifinals
1	(United States) P McEnroe (United States) J Palmer	6	6
(Netherlands) HJ Davids (Netherlands) J Siemerink	4	4
(South Africa) L Bale (South Africa) JL de Jager	3	7	6
(Netherlands) M Oosting (Czech Republic) D Vacek	6	6	3

Final
1	(United States) P McEnroe (United States) J Palmer	6	7
(South Africa) L Bale (South Africa) JL de Jager	3	6
