= 1991 Swiss Indoors =

- Date: 23–29 September
- Edition: 22nd
- Category: World Series
- Draw: 32S / 16D
- Prize money: $675,000
- Surface: Hard / indoor
- Location: Basel, Switzerland
- Venue: St. Jakobshalle

Champions

Singles
- (Switzerland) Jakob Hlasek

Doubles
- (Switzerland) Jakob Hlasek / (United States) Patrick McEnroe
- Swiss Indoors

The 1991 Swiss Indoors was a men's tennis tournament played on indoor hard courts at the St. Jakobshalle in Basel, Switzerland. The tournament was part of the World Series of the 1991 ATP Tour. It was the 22nd edition of the tournament and took place from 23 September until 29 September 1991. Sixth-seeded Jakob Hlasek won the singles title.

== Finals ==
=== Singles ===
(Switzerland) Jakob Hlasek defeated (United States) John McEnroe 7–6^{(7–4)}, 6–0, 6–3

- It was Hlasek's 1st singles title of the year and the 5th, and last, of his career.

=== Doubles ===
(Switzerland) Jakob Hlasek / (United States) Patrick McEnroe defeated (Czechoslovakia) Petr Korda / (United States) John McEnroe 3–6, 7–6, 7–6
