= 1989 Swiss Indoors =

- Date: 3–8 October
- Edition: 20th
- Category: Grand Prix
- Draw: 32S / 16D
- Prize money: $361,000
- Surface: Carpet / indoor
- Location: Basel, Switzerland
- Venue: St. Jakobshalle

Champions

Singles
- (United States) Jim Courier

Doubles
- (West Germany) Udo Riglewski / (West Germany) Michael Stich
- Swiss Indoors

The 1989 Swiss Indoors was a men's tennis tournament played on indoor carpet courts at the St. Jakobshalle in Basel, Switzerland that was part of the 1989 Nabisco Grand Prix circuit. It was the 20th edition of the tournament and took place from 3 October until 8 October 1989. Unseeded Jim Courier won the singles title.

== Finals ==
=== Singles ===
(United States) Jim Courier defeated (Sweden) Stefan Edberg 7–6, 3–6, 2–6, 6–0, 7–5

- It was Courier's first singles title of his career.

=== Doubles ===
(West Germany) Udo Riglewski / (West Germany) Michael Stich defeated (Italy) Omar Camporese / (Switzerland) Claudio Mezzadri 6–3, 4–6, 6–0
