= 1991 Swiss Indoors – Singles =

Singles
- 1991 Swiss Indoors

Final
- Champion: (Switzerland) Jakob Hlasek
- Runner-up: (United States) John McEnroe
- Score: 7–6^{(7–4)}, 6–0, 6–3

Details
- Draw: 32 (3WC/4Q)
- Seeds: 8

Events
| Singles | Doubles |
| ← 1990 · | Swiss Indoors | · 1992 → |

John McEnroe was the defending champion, but lost in the final to Jakob Hlasek. The score was 7–6^{(7–4)}, 6–0, 6–3.

== Seeds ==
1. (Germany) Michael Stich (first round)
2. (Czechoslovakia) Karel Nováček (quarterfinals)
3. (Spain) Sergi Bruguera (second round)
4. (Czechoslovakia) Petr Korda (second round)
5. (Russia) Andrei Cherkasov (first round)
6. (Switzerland) Jakob Hlasek (champion)
7. (Soviet Union) Alexander Volkov (semifinals)
8. (United States) John McEnroe (final)

== Draw ==
=== Key ===
- Q = Qualifier
- WC = Wild card
- LL = Lucky loser
- Alt = Alternate
- ITF = ITF entry
- PR = Protected ranking
- SR = Special ranking
- SE = Special exempt
- JE = Junior exempt
- JR = Junior Accelerator Programme entrant
- CO = College Accelerator Programme entrant
- NG = Next Gen Accelerator Program entrant
- w/o = Walkover
- r = Retired
- d = Defaulted

=== Finals ===
Semifinals
8 | (United States) John McEnroe | 6 | 6
WC | (United States) Jimmy Connors | 1 | 3
6 | (Switzerland) Jakob Hlasek | 7^{7} | 6^{5} | 7^{7}
7 | (Soviet Union) Alexander Volkov | 6^{3} | 7^{7} | 6^{5}

Final
8 | (United States) John McEnroe | 6^{4} | 0 | 3
6 | (Switzerland) Jakob Hlasek | 7^{7} | 6 | 6

=== Top half ===
First round
1 | (Germany) M Stich | 3 | 3
(Sweden) C Bergström | 6 | 6
Q | (Sweden) J Carlsson | 7 | 5 | 6
(Germany) A Mronz | 5 | 7 | 3
(United States) P McEnroe | 6^{3} | 7 | 6
WC | (Switzerland) C Mezzadri | 7^{7} | 5 | 0
Q | (France) T Guardiola | 2 | 4
8 | (United States) J McEnroe | 6 | 6
4 | (Czechoslovakia) P Korda | 3 | 6 | 6
(Sweden) A Järryd | 6 | 4 | 3
Q | (France) L Prades | 3 | 1
WC | (United States) J Connors | 6 | 6
(Italy) P Canè | 4 | 6 | 7^{7}
WC | (Sweden) T Enqvist | 6 | 3 | 6^{5}
(Israel) A Mansdorf | 1 | 6 | 6
5 | (Russia) A Cherkasov | 6 | 3 | 3

Second round
(Sweden) C Bergström | 6 | 6
Q | (Sweden) J Carlsson | 3 | 2
(United States) P McEnroe | 2 | 4
8 | (United States) J McEnroe | 6 | 6
4 | (Czechoslovakia) P Korda | 3 | 4
WC | (United States) J Connors | 6 | 6
(Italy) P Canè | 5 | 4
(Israel) A Mansdorf | 7 | 6

Quarterfinals
(Sweden) C Bergström | 6^{3} | 4
8 | (United States) J McEnroe | 7^{7} | 6
WC | (United States) J Connors | 6 | 6
(Israel) A Mansdorf | 3 | 2

Semifinals
8 | (United States) J McEnroe | 6 | 6
WC | (United States) J Connors | 1 | 3

=== Bottom half ===
First round
6 | (Switzerland) J Hlasek | 6 | 6
(Sweden) J Gunnarsson | 3 | 2
(Germany) CU Steeb | 6 | 7^{7}
(France) JP Fleurian | 0 | 6^{3}
(United States) K Curren | 2 | 7^{7} | 6
(Switzerland) M Rosset | 6 | 6^{1} | 1
Q | (Sweden) D Engel | 6 | 5 | 6^{2}
3 | (Spain) S Bruguera | 2 | 7 | 7^{7}
7 | (Soviet Union) A Volkov | 6 | 6
(France) G Raoux | 3 | 4
(Spain) T Carbonell | 7 | 6
(Germany) C Saceanu | 5 | 3
(Sweden) N Kulti | 6 | 6
(Italy) C Caratti | 1 | 4
(Netherlands) P Haarhuis | 2 | 6 | 3
2 | (Czechoslovakia) K Nováček | 6 | 1 | 6

Second round
6 | (Switzerland) J Hlasek | 7^{10} | 6
(Germany) CU Steeb | 6^{8} | 3
(United States) K Curren | 6 | 3 | 6
3 | (Spain) S Bruguera | 4 | 6 | 3
7 | (Soviet Union) A Volkov | 6 | 6
(Spain) T Carbonell | 3 | 4
(Sweden) N Kulti | 4 | 7^{7} | 6^{2}
2 | (Czechoslovakia) K Nováček | 6 | 6^{2} | 7^{7}

Quarterfinals
6 | (Switzerland) J Hlasek | 6 | 6
(United States) K Curren | 3 | 4
7 | (Soviet Union) A Volkov | 6 | 6^{9} | 6
2 | (Czechoslovakia) K Nováček | 1 | 7^{11} | 3

Semifinals
6 | (Switzerland) J Hlasek | 7^{7} | 6^{5} | 7^{7}
7 | (Soviet Union) A Volkov | 6^{3} | 7^{7} | 6^{5}
