= 1992 Swiss Indoors =

- Date: 28 September – 4 October
- Edition: 23rd
- Category: World Series
- Draw: 32S / 16D
- Prize money: $700,000
- Surface: Hard / indoor
- Location: Basel, Switzerland
- Venue: St. Jakobshalle

Champions

Singles
- (Germany) Boris Becker

Doubles
- (Netherlands) Tom Nijssen / (Czechoslovakia) Cyril Suk
- Swiss Indoors

The 1992 Swiss Indoors was a men's tennis tournament played on indoor hard courts at the St. Jakobshalle in Basel, Switzerland that was part of the World Series of the 1992 ATP Tour. It was the 23rd edition of the tournament and was held from 28 September until 4 October 1992. Second-seeded Boris Becker won the singles title.

== Finals ==
=== Singles ===
(Germany) Boris Becker defeated (Czechoslovakia) Petr Korda 3–6, 6–3, 6–2, 6–4

- It was Becker's 3rd singles title of the year and the 34th of his career.

=== Doubles ===
(Netherlands) Tom Nijssen / (Czechoslovakia) Cyril Suk defeated (Czechoslovakia) Karel Nováček / (Czechoslovakia) David Rikl 6–3, 6–4
