= 1992 Swiss Indoors – Singles =

Singles
- 1992 Swiss Indoors

Final
- Champion: (Germany) Boris Becker
- Runner-up: (Czech Republic) Petr Korda
- Score: 3–6, 6–3, 6–2, 6–4

Details
- Draw: 32 (3WC/4Q/1LL)
- Seeds: 8

Events
| Singles | Doubles |
| ← 1991 · | Swiss Indoors | · 1993 → |

Jakob Hlasek was the defending champion, but lost in the first round to Jonas Svensson.

Boris Becker won the title by defeating Petr Korda 3–6, 6–3, 6–2, 6–4 in the final.

== Seeds ==
1. (Czech Republic) Petr Korda (final)
2. (Germany) Boris Becker (champion)
3. (United States) Ivan Lendl (semifinals)
4. (Russia) Alexander Volkov (first round)
5. (United States) Brad Gilbert (second round)
6. (Czech Republic) Karel Nováček (first round)
7. (Israel) Amos Mansdorf (quarterfinals)
8. (Germany) Carl-Uwe Steeb (first round)

== Draw ==
=== Key ===
- Q = Qualifier
- WC = Wild card
- LL = Lucky loser
- Alt = Alternate
- SE = Special exempt
- PR = Protected ranking
- ITF = ITF entry
- JE = Junior exempt
- w/o = Walkover
- r = Retired
- d = Defaulted
- SR = Special ranking

=== Finals ===
Semifinals
1 | (Czech Republic) Petr Korda | 6 | 6
3 | (United States) Ivan Lendl | 4 | 3
(Switzerland) Marc Rosset | 2 | 4
2 | (Germany) Boris Becker | 6 | 6

Final
1 | (Czech Republic) Petr Korda | 6 | 3 | 2 | 4
2 | (Germany) Boris Becker | 3 | 6 | 6 | 6

=== Top half ===
First round
1 | (Czechoslovakia) P Korda | 6 | 6
(Russia) A Cherkasov | 2 | 2
(Argentina) A Mancini | 0 | 0^{r}
(Brazil) J Oncins | 6 | 1
(United States) J Tarango | 6^{0} | 6^{6}
(Italy) S Pescosolido | 7^{7} | 7^{8}
(France) C Pioline | 2 | 6 | 6
8 | (Germany) CU Steeb | 6 | 3 | 4
3 | (United States) I Lendl | 6 | 6
(Netherlands) J Siemerink | 4 | 2
(France) A Boetsch | 6 | 6
(France) O Delaître | 2 | 1
(Russia) A Chesnokov | 6 | 6
WC | (Iran) M Bahrami | 3 | 4
(Argentina) C Miniussi | 1 | 3
5 | (United States) B Gilbert | 6 | 6

Second round
1 | (Czechoslovakia) P Korda | 6 | 3
(Brazil) J Oncins | 2 | 0^{r}
(Italy) S Pescosolido | 4 | 5
(France) C Pioline | 6 | 7
3 | (United States) I Lendl | 6 | 6
(France) A Boetsch | 3 | 4
(Russia) A Chesnokov | 6 | 2 | 7^{7}
5 | (United States) B Gilbert | 1 | 6 | 6^{3}

Quarterfinals
1 | (Czechoslovakia) P Korda | 2 | 6 | 6
(France) C Pioline | 6 | 3 | 2
3 | (United States) I Lendl | 6 | 6
(Russia) A Chesnokov | 1 | 2

Semifinals
1 | (Czechoslovakia) P Korda | 6 | 6
3 | (United States) I Lendl | 4 | 3

=== Bottom half ===
First round
6 | (Czechoslovakia) K Nováček | 3 | 2
WC | (Switzerland) C Mezzadri | 6 | 6
Q | (Netherlands) HJ Davids | 7^{7} | 3 | 3
Q | (Sweden) P Lundgren | 6^{4} | 6 | 6
(Switzerland) J Hlasek | 1 | 6 | 1
LL | (Sweden) J Svensson | 6 | 4 | 6
(Switzerland) M Rosset | 7^{7} | 6
4 | (Russia) A Volkov | 6^{1} | 4
7 | (Israel) A Mansdorf | 2 | 7^{7} | 6
Q | (Haiti) R Agénor | 6 | 6^{3} | 4
Q | (Sweden) T Enqvist | 6 | 6
(Sweden) C Bergström | 2 | 4
(Sweden) N Kulti | 6 | 6
WC | (Sweden) B Borg | 2 | 1
(Sweden) M Larsson | 5 | 6^{10}
2 | (Germany) B Becker | 7 | 7^{12}

Second round
WC | (Switzerland) C Mezzadri | 3 | 3
Q | (Sweden) P Lundgren | 6 | 6
LL | (Sweden) J Svensson | 5 | 6 | 4
(Switzerland) M Rosset | 7 | 2 | 6
7 | (Israel) A Mansdorf | 6 | 2 | 6
Q | (Sweden) T Enqvist | 3 | 6 | 3
(Sweden) N Kulti | 4 | 5
2 | (Germany) B Becker | 6 | 7

Quarterfinals
Q | (Sweden) P Lundgren | 4 | 2
(Switzerland) M Rosset | 6 | 6
7 | (Israel) A Mansdorf | 6^{5} | 7^{8} | 3
2 | (Germany) B Becker | 7^{7} | 6^{6} | 6

Semifinals
(Switzerland) M Rosset | 2 | 4
2 | (Germany) B Becker | 6 | 6
