= 1993 Swiss Indoors =

Tennis tournament

- Date: 26 September – 2 October
- Edition: 24th
- Category: World Series
- Draw: 32S / 16D
- Prize money: $775,000
- Surface: Hard / indoor
- Location: Basel, Switzerland
- Venue: St. Jakobshalle

Champions

Singles
- (Germany) Michael Stich

Doubles
- (Zimbabwe) Byron Black / (United States) Jonathan Stark
- Swiss Indoors

The 1993 Swiss Indoors was a men's tennis tournament played on indoor hard court at the St. Jakobshalle in Basel, Switzerland that was part of the World Series of the 1993 ATP Tour. It was the 24th edition of the tournament and was held from 26 September until 2 October 1993. Second-seeded Michael Stich, who entered on a wildcard, won the singles title. Future world no. 1 Roger Federer appeared as a ball boy in this tournament.

== Finals ==
=== Singles ===
(Germany) Michael Stich defeated (Sweden) Stefan Edberg 6–4, 6–7^{(5–7)}, 6–3, 6–2

- It was Stich's 4th singles title of the year and the 11th of his career.

=== Doubles ===
(Zimbabwe) Byron Black / (United States) Jonathan Stark defeated (United States) Brad Pearce / (United States) Dave Randall 3–6, 7–5, 6–3
