= 1994 Swiss Indoors – Singles =

Singles
- 1994 Swiss Indoors

Final
- Champion: (South Africa) Wayne Ferreira
- Runner-up: (United States) Patrick McEnroe
- Score: 4–6, 6–2, 7–6^{(9–7)}, 6–3

Details
- Draw: 32 (3WC/4Q/3LL)
- Seeds: 8

Events
Singles	Doubles
- Swiss Indoors

Michael Stich was the defending champion, but lost in the quarterfinals to qualifier Cristiano Caratti.

Wayne Ferreira won the title by defeating wild card Patrick McEnroe 4–6, 6–2, 7–6^{(9–7)}, 6–3 in the final.

== Seeds ==
1. (Germany) Michael Stich (quarterfinals)
2. (Sweden) Stefan Edberg (second round)
3. (Russia) Yevgeny Kafelnikov (second round)
4. (South Africa) Wayne Ferreira (champion)
5. (Switzerland) Marc Rosset (quarterfinals)
6. (Peru) Jaime Yzaga (second round)
7. (France) Arnaud Boetsch (second round)
8. (France) Cédric Pioline (second round)

== Draw ==
Key

- Q = Qualifier
- WC = Wild card
- LL = Lucky loser
- Alt = Alternate
- ITF = ITF entry
- PR = Protected ranking
- SR = Special ranking
- SE = Special exempt
- JE = Junior exempt
- JR = Junior Accelerator Programme entrant
- CO = College Accelerator Programme entrant
- NG = Next Gen Accelerator Program entrant
- w/o = Walkover
- r = Retired
- d = Defaulted

=== Finals ===
Semifinals
Q	(Italy) Cristiano Caratti	3	3
WC	(United States) Patrick McEnroe	6	6
4	(South Africa) Wayne Ferreira	7^{7}	6
(France) Guy Forget	6^{3}	4

Final
WC	(United States) Patrick McEnroe	6	2	6^{7}	3
4	(South Africa) Wayne Ferreira	4	6	7^{9}	6

=== Top half ===
First round
1	(Germany) M Stich	6	7^{7}
WC	(Sweden) M Larsson	1	6^{4}
Q	(France) T Guardiola	6^{5}	4
(Sweden) J Svensson	7^{7}	6
Q	(Italy) C Caratti	6	6^{6}	6
(Czech Republic) M Damm	3	7^{8}	4
(Israel) A Mansdorf	2	5
7	(France) A Boetsch	6	7
3	(Russia) Y Kafelnikov	6	6
(Czech Republic) D Vacek	4	3
Q	(France) L Roux	6	6
(Czech Republic) D Rikl	2	1
(Russia) A Volkov	3	3
WC	(United States) P McEnroe	6	6
(Germany) M Zoecke	7	6^{6}	5
6	(Peru) J Yzaga	5	7^{8}	7

Second round
1	(Germany) M Stich	6	6
(Sweden) J Svensson	3	4
Q	(Italy) C Caratti	6	6
7	(France) A Boetsch	2	4
3	(Russia) Y Kafelnikov	6^{6}	6	6^{4}
Q	(France) L Roux	7^{8}	2	7^{7}
WC	(United States) P McEnroe	2	6	7
6	(Peru) J Yzaga	6	3	5

Quarterfinals
1	(Germany) M Stich	6	6^{3}	6^{5}
Q	(Italy) C Caratti	4	7^{7}	7^{7}
Q	(France) L Roux	6^{4}	2
WC	(United States) P McEnroe	7^{7}	6

Semifinals
Q	(Italy) C Caratti	3	3
WC	(United States) P McEnroe	6	6

=== Bottom half ===
First round
5	(Switzerland) M Rosset	6	6^{4}	6
(Germany) K Braasch	2	7^{7}	2
(France) JP Fleurian	6	6
(Haiti) R Agénor	4	4
LL	(Zimbabwe) W Black	2	7^{7}	4
Q	(Sweden) A Järryd	6	6^{5}	6
LL	(Germany) D Dier	5	4
4	(South Africa) W Ferreira	7	6
8	(France) C Pioline	6	6
(France) R Gilbert	0	3
WC	(Germany) MK Goellner	6^{6}	6	3
(United States) J Palmer	7^{8}	4	6
(Switzerland) J Hlasek	4	6^{4}
(France) G Forget	6	7^{7}
LL	(Netherlands) J Siemerink	6	3	2
2	(Sweden) S Edberg	3	6	6

Second round
5	(Switzerland) M Rosset	6	6
(France) JP Fleurian	2	2
Q	(Sweden) A Järryd	6	2	2
4	(South Africa) W Ferreira	4	6	6
8	(France) C Pioline	6^{5}	1
(United States) J Palmer	7^{7}	6
(France) G Forget	3	7	6
2	(Sweden) S Edberg	6	5	3

Quarterfinals
5	(Switzerland) M Rosset	5	7^{7}	3
4	(South Africa) W Ferreira	7	6^{4}	6
(United States) J Palmer	5	7	6^{6}
(France) G Forget	7	5	7^{8}

Semifinals
4	(South Africa) W Ferreira	7^{7}	6
(France) G Forget	6^{3}	4
