= 1989 Swiss Indoors – Singles =

Singles
- 1989 Swiss Indoors

Final
- Champion: (United States) Jim Courier
- Runner-up: (Sweden) Stefan Edberg
- Score: 7–6, 3–6, 2–6, 6–0, 7–5

Details
- Draw: 32 (3WC/4Q)
- Seeds: 8

Events
Singles	Doubles
- Swiss Indoors

Jim Courier defeated defending champion Stefan Edberg in the final, 7–6, 3–6, 2–6, 6–0, 7–5 to win the singles tennis title at the 1989 Swiss Indoors. It was his first professional title, becoming the youngest champion in Swiss Indoors history.

== Seeds ==
1. (Sweden) Stefan Edberg (final)
2. (Switzerland) Jakob Hlasek (second round)
3. (United States) Jay Berger (first round)
4. (United States) Aaron Krickstein (second round)
5. (United States) Jimmy Connors (semifinals)
6. (Soviet Union) Andrei Chesnokov (first round)
7. (Israel) Amos Mansdorf (first round)
8. (Ecuador) Andrés Gómez (semifinals)

== Draw ==
Key

- Q = Qualifier
- WC = Wild card
- LL = Lucky loser
- Alt = Alternate
- ITF = ITF entry
- PR = Protected ranking
- SR = Special ranking
- SE = Special exempt
- JE = Junior exempt
- JR = Junior Accelerator Programme entrant
- CO = College Accelerator Programme entrant
- NG = Next Gen Accelerator Program entrant
- w/o = Walkover
- r = Retired
- d = Defaulted

=== Finals ===
Semifinals
1	(Sweden) Stefan Edberg	6	7
5/WC	(United States) Jimmy Connors	1	5
(United States) Jim Courier	7	6
8	(Ecuador) Andrés Gómez	6	4

Final
1	(Sweden) Stefan Edberg	6	6	6	0	5
(United States) Jim Courier	7	3	2	6	7

=== Top half ===
First round
1	(Sweden) S Edberg	3	7	6
(Soviet Union) A Cherkasov	6	6	1
(France) J Potier	6	6	2
(Soviet Union) A Volkov	7	4	6
(Sweden) J Svensson	6	6
Q	(Iran) M Bahrami	1	2
Q	(France) O Delaître	6	6
7	(Israel) A Mansdorf	4	4
3	(United States) J Berger	1	3
(Italy) O Camporese	6	6
(West Germany) M Stich	6	5	3
(Netherlands) M Schapers	3	7	6
(Haiti) R Agénor	2	2
(Sweden) J Gunnarsson	6	6
(Denmark) M Tauson	3	1
5/WC	(United States) J Connors	6	6

Second round
1	(Sweden) S Edberg	6	6
(Soviet Union) A Volkov	2	4
(Sweden) J Svensson	7	4	5
Q	(France) O Delaître	6	6	7
(Italy) O Camporese	6	6
(Netherlands) M Schapers	4	4
(Sweden) J Gunnarsson	4	2
5/WC	(United States) J Connors	6	6

Quarterfinals
1	(Sweden) S Edberg	7	6
Q	(France) O Delaître	6	1
(Italy) O Camporese	4	3
5/WC	(United States) J Connors	6	6

Semifinals
1	(Sweden) S Edberg	6	7
5/WC	(United States) J Connors	1	5

=== Bottom half ===
First round
6	(Soviet Union) A Chesnokov	4	5
(Sweden) P Lundgren	6	7
Q	(France) É Winogradsky	6	7	5
(Uruguay) M Filippini	7	5	7
(Sweden) M Gustafsson	3	6
(United States) J Courier	6	7
(Argentina) G Pérez Roldán	5	1
4	(United States) A Krickstein	7	6
8	(Ecuador) A Gómez	6	6
WC	(Switzerland) M Rosset	3	3
WC	(Switzerland) C Mezzadri	4	6	1
(Czechoslovakia) M Šrejber	6	3	6
(Socialist Federal Republic of Yugoslavia) G Ivanišević	7	6
Q	(West Germany) P Baur	6	2
(India) R Krishnan	3	6
2	(Switzerland) J Hlasek	6	7

Second round
(Sweden) P Lundgren	2	2
(Uruguay) M Filippini	6	6
(United States) J Courier	6	2	6
4	(United States) A Krickstein	4	6	2
8	(Ecuador) A Gómez	6	6	7
(Czechoslovakia) M Šrejber	7	4	6
(Socialist Federal Republic of Yugoslavia) G Ivanišević	4	6	7
2	(Switzerland) J Hlasek	6	3	5

Quarterfinals
(Uruguay) M Filippini	7	2	4
(United States) J Courier	5	6	6
8	(Ecuador) A Gómez	6	7
(Socialist Federal Republic of Yugoslavia) G Ivanišević	3	6

Semifinals
(United States) J Courier	7	6
8	(Ecuador) A Gómez	6	4
