= 1992 Swiss Indoors – Doubles =

Doubles
- 1992 Swiss Indoors

Final
- Champions: (Netherlands) Tom Nijssen (Czechoslovakia) Cyril Suk
- Runners-up: (Czechoslovakia) Karel Nováček (Czechoslovakia) David Rikl
- Score: 6–3, 6–4

Details
- Draw: 16
- Seeds: 4

Events
Singles	Doubles
- Swiss Indoors

Jakob Hlasek and Patrick McEnroe were the defending champions, but McEnroe did not compete this year. Hlasek teamed up with Marc Rosset and lost in the quarterfinals to Karel Nováček and David Rikl.

Tom Nijssen and Cyril Suk won the title by defeating Karel Nováček and David Rikl 6–3, 6–4 in the final.

== Seeds ==
1. (Switzerland) Jakob Hlasek / (Switzerland) Marc Rosset (quarterfinals)
2. (Netherlands) Tom Nijssen / (Czechoslovakia) Cyril Suk (champions)
3. (Netherlands) Hendrik Jan Davids / (Czechoslovakia) Libor Pimek (first round)
4. (United States) Mike Briggs (tennis) / (United States) Trevor Kronemann (first round)

== Draw ==
Key

- Q = Qualifier
- WC = Wild card
- LL = Lucky loser
- Alt = Alternate
- ITF = ITF entry
- PR = Protected ranking
- SR = Special ranking
- SE = Special exempt
- JE = Junior exempt
- JR = Junior Accelerator Programme entrant
- CO = College Accelerator Programme entrant
- NG = Next Gen Accelerator Program entrant
- w/o = Walkover
- r = Retired
- d = Defaulted

=== Draw ===
First round
1	(Switzerland) J Hlasek (Switzerland) M Rosset	7	6
(Sweden) R Båthman (Sweden) R Bergh	6	3
Q	(South Africa) M Barnard (Sweden) P Lundgren	6	4	2
(Czechoslovakia) K Nováček (Czechoslovakia) D Rikl	3	6	6
3	(Netherlands) HJ Davids (Czechoslovakia) L Pimek	1	6	2
(Czechoslovakia) P Korda (Germany) U Riglewski	6	0	6
(United Kingdom) N Broad (South Africa) S Kruger	6	6
WC	(Sweden) B Borg (United Kingdom) J Lloyd	1	4
(United States) M Keil (United States) D Randall	7	3	6
(Argentina) C Miniussi (Brazil) C Motta	6	6	3
(United States) B Pearce (South Africa) B Talbot	7	6
4	(United States) M Briggs (United States) T Kronemann	6	2
(United States) S Cannon (United States) G Van Emburgh	4	3
WC	(Germany) B Becker (Germany) CU Steeb	6	6
(Netherlands) T Kempers (Kenya) P Wekesa	4	7	2
2	(Netherlands) T Nijssen (Czechoslovakia) C Suk	6	6	6

Quarterfinals
1	(Switzerland) J Hlasek (Switzerland) M Rosset	6	4	3
(Czechoslovakia) K Nováček (Czechoslovakia) D Rikl	4	6	6
(Czechoslovakia) P Korda (Germany) U Riglewski	6	3
(United Kingdom) N Broad (South Africa) S Kruger	7	6
(United States) M Keil (United States) D Randall	7	6
(United States) B Pearce (South Africa) B Talbot	6	1
WC	(Germany) B Becker (Germany) CU Steeb	7	6	3
2	(Netherlands) T Nijssen (Czechoslovakia) C Suk	6	7	6

Semifinals
(Czechoslovakia) K Nováček (Czechoslovakia) D Rikl	4	6	6
(United Kingdom) N Broad (South Africa) S Kruger	6	4	4
(United States) M Keil (United States) D Randall	4	4
2	(Netherlands) T Nijssen (Czechoslovakia) C Suk	6	6

Final
(Czechoslovakia) K Nováček (Czechoslovakia) D Rikl	3	4
2	(Netherlands) T Nijssen (Czechoslovakia) C Suk	6	6
