= 1994 Swiss Indoors =

- Date: 26 September – 3 October
- Edition: 25th
- Category: ATP World Series
- Draw: 32S / 16D
- Prize money: $775,000
- Surface: Hard / Indoor
- Location: Basel, Switzerland

Champions

Singles
- (South Africa) Wayne Ferreira

Doubles
- (United States) Patrick McEnroe / (United States) Jared Palmer
- Swiss Indoors

The 1994 Davidoff Swiss Indoor was an ATP men's tennis tournament held in Basel, Switzerland and played on indoor hard courts that was part of the ATP World Series of the 1994 ATP Tour. It was the 25th edition of the tournament and was held from 26 September through 3 October 1994. Fourth-seeded Wayne Ferreira won his 4th title of the year, and 6th of his career.

== Finals ==
=== Singles ===
(South Africa) Wayne Ferreira defeated (United States) Patrick McEnroe, 4–6, 6–2, 7–6^{(9–7)}, 6–3

=== Doubles ===
(United States) Patrick McEnroe / (United States) Jared Palmer defeated (South Africa) Lan Bale / (South Africa) John-Laffnie de Jager 6–3, 7–6
