= 1990 Chevrolet Classic – Doubles =

Doubles
- 1990 Chevrolet Classic

Final
- Champions: (Argentina) Javier Frana (Argentina) Gustavo Luza
- Runners-up: (Brazil) Luiz Mattar (Brazil) Cássio Motta
- Score: 7–6, 7–6

Details
- Draw: 16
- Seeds: 4

Events
Singles	Doubles
← 1989 ·	Guarujá Open	· 1991 →

Ricardo Acioly and Dácio Campos were the defending champions, but competed this year with different partners. Acioly teamed up with Miguel Nido and lost in the quarterfinals to Danilo Marcelino and Mauro Menezes, while Campos teamed up with José Daher and lost in the first round to Pablo Albano and César Kist.

Javier Frana and Gustavo Luza won the title by defeating Luiz Mattar and Cássio Motta 7–6, 7–6 in the final.

== Seeds ==
1. (Argentina) Javier Frana / (Argentina) Gustavo Luza (champions)
2. (Brazil) Luiz Mattar / (Brazil) Cássio Motta (final)
3. (Brazil) Danilo Marcelino / (Brazil) Mauro Menezes (semifinals)
4. (Argentina) Martín Jaite / (Uruguay) Diego Pérez (withdrew)

== Draw ==
=== Key ===
- Q = Qualifier
- WC = Wild card
- LL = Lucky loser
- Alt = Alternate
- SE = Special exempt
- PR = Protected ranking
- ITF = ITF entry
- JE = Junior exempt
- w/o = Walkover
- r = Retired
- d = Defaulted
- SR = Special ranking

First Round
1	(Argentina) J Frana (Argentina) G Luza	6	6
(Cuba) J Pino (Cuba) M Tabares	2	4
(Argentina) P Albano (Brazil) C Kist	6^{4}	6	6
(Brazil) D Campos (Brazil) J Daher	7^{7}	2	2
LL	(Argentina) E Bengoechea (United States) J Sobel	2	2
(Argentina) G Rivas (Argentina) R Argüello	6	6
(Brazil) N Aerts (Brazil) F Roese	6	6
(Brazil) R Camargo (Brazil) J Oncins	2	4
(Brazil) R Acioly (Puerto Rico) M Nido	5	6	6
(Brazil) O Della (Japan) E Furusho	7	0	0
(Brazil) A Hocevar (Brazil) M Hocevar	3	2
3	(Brazil) D Marcelino (Brazil) M Menezes	6	6
(West Germany) C Saceanu (United States) J Tarango	6	6
(Brazil) I Kley (Brazil) E Oliveira	3	1
(Germany) P Ballauff (West Germany) H Rittersbacher	3	4
2	(Brazil) L Mattar (Brazil) C Motta	6	6

Quarterfinals
1	(Argentina) J Frana (Argentina) G Luza	6^{4}	6	6
(Argentina) P Albano (Brazil) C Kist	7^{7}	2	2
(Argentina) G Rivas (Argentina) R Argüello	6^{3}	2
(Brazil) N Aerts (Brazil) F Roese	7^{7}	6
(Brazil) R Acioly (Puerto Rico) M Nido	6^{5}	4
3	(Brazil) D Marcelino (Brazil) M Menezes	7^{7}	6
(West Germany) C Saceanu (United States) J Tarango
2	(Brazil) L Mattar (Brazil) C Motta	w/o

Semifinals
1	(Argentina) J Frana (Argentina) G Luza	6	6
(Brazil) N Aerts (Brazil) F Roese	4	3
3	(Brazil) D Marcelino (Brazil) M Menezes	6^{5}	2
2	(Brazil) L Mattar (Brazil) C Motta	7^{7}	6

Final
1	(Argentina) J Frana (Argentina) G Luza	7^{7}	7^{10}
2	(Brazil) L Mattar (Brazil) C Motta	6^{4}	6^{8}
