= 1988 Guarujá Open – Doubles =

Doubles
- 1988 Guarujá Open

Final
- Champions: (Chile) Ricardo Acuña (United States) Luke Jensen
- Runners-up: (Argentina) Javier Frana (Uruguay) Diego Pérez
- Score: 6–1, 6–4

Events
Singles	Doubles
- Guarujá Open

Luiz Mattar and Cássio Motta were the defending champions, but both players decided to compete on the singles tournament only.

Ricardo Acuña and Luke Jensen won the title by defeating Javier Frana and Diego Pérez 6–1, 6–4 in the final.

== Seeds ==
1. (Argentina) Javier Frana / (Uruguay) Diego Pérez (Final)
2. (Brazil) Ivan Kley / (Brazil) Danilo Marcelino (Semifinals)
3. (United States) Bud Cox / (Argentina) Roberto Saad (Quarterfinals)
4. (Brazil) Ricardo Acioly / (Brazil) José Daher (Quarterfinals)

== Draw ==
Key

- Q = Qualifier
- WC = Wild card
- LL = Lucky loser
- Alt = Alternate
- ITF = ITF entry
- PR = Protected ranking
- SR = Special ranking
- SE = Special exempt
- JE = Junior exempt
- JR = Junior Accelerator Programme entrant
- CO = College Accelerator Programme entrant
- NG = Next Gen Accelerator Program entrant
- w/o = Walkover
- r = Retired
- d = Defaulted

=== Draw ===
First Round
1	(Argentina) J Frana (Uruguay) D Pérez	3	6	6
(Japan) E Furusho (Brazil) J Wasserfirer	6	4	2
(Brazil) R Camargo (Brazil) E Oliveira	6	6
(Brazil) N Aerts (Brazil) F Roese	4	4
3	(United States) B Cox (Argentina) R Saad	6	6
(Brazil) M Hocevar (Brazil) A Hocevar	3	4
(Uruguay) M Filippini (Uruguay) D Montes de Oca	2	7	5
(Brazil) G Barbosa (Brazil) M Menezes	6	6	7
(Sweden) R Båthman (Brazil) J Góes	6	3
(Chile) R Acuña (United States) L Jensen	7	6
(Argentina) R Argüello (United States) L Duncan	2	3
4	(Brazil) R Acioly (Brazil) J Daher	6	6
(Brazil) D Campos (Brazil) C Kist	6	6
(Argentina) G Garetto (Brazil) E Martins	1	4
(Peru) P Arraya (Brazil) J Soares	4	6	5
2	(Brazil) I Kley (Brazil) D Marcelino	6	3	7

Quarterfinals
1	(Argentina) J Frana (Uruguay) D Pérez	6	6
(Brazil) R Camargo (Brazil) E Oliveira	1	3
3	(United States) B Cox (Argentina) R Saad	4	6	3
(Brazil) G Barbosa (Brazil) M Menezes	6	4	6
(Chile) R Acuña (United States) L Jensen	6	6	6
4	(Brazil) R Acioly (Brazil) J Daher	3	7	2
(Brazil) D Campos (Brazil) C Kist	6	5
2	(Brazil) I Kley (Brazil) D Marcelino	7	7

Semifinals
1	(Argentina) J Frana (Uruguay) D Pérez	7	6
(Brazil) G Barbosa (Brazil) M Menezes	6	2
(Chile) R Acuña (United States) L Jensen	6	6
2	(Brazil) I Kley (Brazil) D Marcelino	3	2

Final
1	(Argentina) J Frana (Uruguay) D Pérez	1	4
(Chile) R Acuña (United States) L Jensen	6	6
