= 1989 Guarujá Open – Singles =

Singles
- 1989 Guarujá Open
- 1988 Champion: (Brazil) Luiz Mattar

Final
- Champion: (Brazil) Luiz Mattar
- Runner-up: (United States) Jimmy Brown
- Score: 7–6, 6–4

Details
- Draw: 32
- Seeds: 8

Events
Singles	Doubles
← 1988 ·	Guarujá Open	· 1990 →

Luiz Mattar was the defending champion and won in the final 7–6, 6–4 against Jimmy Brown.

== Seeds ==
A champion seed is indicated in bold text while text in italics indicates the round in which that seed was eliminated.

1. (Brazil) **Luiz Mattar (champion)**
2. (United States) Lawson Duncan (first round)
3. (Peru) Jaime Yzaga (semifinals)
4. (Brazil) Cássio Motta (quarterfinals)
5. (Argentina) Javier Frana (first round)
6. (Argentina) Eduardo Bengoechea (quarterfinals)
7. (United States) Todd Witsken (quarterfinals)
8. (Brazil) Danilo Marcelino (semifinals)

== Draw ==
=== Key ===
- Q = Qualifier
- WC = Wild card
- LL = Lucky loser
- Alt = Alternate
- SE = Special exempt
- PR = Protected ranking
- ITF = ITF entry
- JE = Junior exempt
- w/o = Walkover
- r = Retired
- d = Defaulted
- SR = Special ranking

First round
1	(Brazil) **L Mattar**	**6**	**6**
(Brazil) C Kist	2	2
LL	(Brazil) **G Barbosa**	**7**	**6**
(Brazil) J Daher	6	4
(Brazil) R Acioly	**6**	0	3
WC	(Brazil) **R Jabali**	4	**6**	**6**
Q	(Brazil) N Aerts	**7**	3	3
7	(United States) **T Witsken**	5	**6**	**6**
3	(Peru) **J Yzaga**	**7**	**6**
(Argentina) R Argüello	6	1
WC	(Brazil) J Oncins	2	3
(Canada) **M Wostenholme**	**6**	**6**
(Brazil) **M Menezes**	**6**	**6**
(Brazil) J Góes	3	4
(Brazil) D Campos	6	6
6	(Argentina) **E Bengoechea**	**7**	**7**
5	(Argentina) J Frana	**6**	2	3
(United States) **J Brown**	4	**6**	**6**
Q	(Brazil) E Oliveira	4	3
(Brazil) **M Hennemann**	**6**	**6**
Q	(Brazil) **R Camargo**	3	**6**	**6**
(Brazil) I Kley	**6**	3	4
(Brazil) F Roese	3	2
4	(Brazil) **C Motta**	**6**	**6**
8	(Brazil) **D Marcelino**	**6**	**7**
(United States) M Allen	3	6
(Argentina) R Azar	2	**7**	1
WC	(Brazil) **A Hocevar**	**6**	5	**6**
(West Germany) P Ballauff	6	4
(Ecuador) **R Viver**	**7**	**6**
(Sweden) **C Allgårdh**	**7**	**6**
2	(United States) L Duncan	5	0

Second round
1	(Brazil) **L Mattar**	**7**	**6**
LL	(Brazil) G Barbosa	6	1
WC	(Brazil) R Jabali	2	2
7	(United States) **T Witsken**	**6**	**6**
3	(Peru) **J Yzaga**	**6**	**6**
(Canada) M Wostenholme	3	2
(Brazil) M Menezes	4	4
6	(Argentina) **E Bengoechea**	**6**	**6**
(United States) **J Brown**	**6**	**6**
(Brazil) M Hennemann	0	0
Q	(Brazil) R Camargo	1	1
4	(Brazil) **C Motta**	**6**	**6**
8	(Brazil) **D Marcelino**	**6**	**7**
WC	(Brazil) A Hocevar	4	6
(Ecuador) R Viver	2	4
(Sweden) **C Allgårdh**	**6**	**6**

Quarterfinals
1	(Brazil) **L Mattar**	**7**	**7**
7	(United States) T Witsken	5	5
3	(Peru) **J Yzaga**	3	**6**	**6**
6	(Argentina) E Bengoechea	**6**	2	4
(United States) **J Brown**	**6**	6	**7**
4	(Brazil) C Motta	4	**7**	5
8	(Brazil) **D Marcelino**	**6**	**6**
(Sweden) C Allgårdh	3	2

Semifinals
1	(Brazil) **L Mattar**	**6**	**6**
3	(Peru) J Yzaga	3	2
(United States) **J Brown**	1	**6**	**6**
8	(Brazil) D Marcelino	**6**	1	2

Final
1	(Brazil) **Luiz Mattar**	**7**	**6**
(United States) Jimmy Brown	6	4
