= 1989 Guarujá Open – Doubles =

Doubles
- 1989 Guarujá Open
- 1988 Champions: (Chile) Ricardo Acuña (United States) Luke Jensen

Final
- Champions: (Brazil) Ricardo Acioly (Brazil) Dacio Campos
- Runners-up: (Brazil) César Kist (Brazil) Mauro Menezes
- Score: 7–6, 7–6

Details
- Draw: 16
- Seeds: 4

Events
Singles	Doubles
← 1988 ·	Guarujá Open	· 1990 →

Ricardo Acuña and Luke Jensen were the defending champions but did not compete that year.

Ricardo Acioly and Dacio Campos won in the final 7–6, 7–6 against César Kist and Mauro Menezes.

== Seeds ==
Champion seeds are indicated in bold text while text in italics indicates the round in which those seeds were eliminated.

1. (United States) Todd Witsken / (Peru) Jaime Yzaga (quarterfinals)
2. (Brazil) **Ricardo Acioly** / (Brazil) **Dacio Campos (champions)**
3. (Brazil) Luiz Mattar / (Brazil) Cássio Motta (semifinals)
4. (Brazil) Ivan Kley / (Brazil) Fernando Roese (first round)

== Draw ==
=== Key ===
- Q = Qualifier
- WC = Wild card
- LL = Lucky loser
- Alt = Alternate
- SE = Special exempt
- PR = Protected ranking
- ITF = ITF entry
- JE = Junior exempt
- w/o = Walkover
- r = Retired
- d = Defaulted
- SR = Special ranking

First round
1	(United States) **T Witsken** (Peru) **J Yzaga**	**6**	**7**
(Argentina) R Argüello (Brazil) J Góes	0	6
(Argentina) R Azar (West Germany) P Ballauff	4	1
(Brazil) **N Aerts** (Brazil) **A Hocevar**	**6**	**6**
4	(Brazil) I Kley (Brazil) F Roese	3	3
(Brazil) **C Kist** (Brazil) **M Menezes**	**6**	**6**
(Sweden) C Allgårdh (Ecuador) R Viver	2	3
(Argentina) **J L Clerc** (Argentina) **J Frana**	**6**	**6**
(Argentina) **E Bengoechea** (Brazil) **J Daher**	**6**	**6**
(Brazil) G Barbosa (Brazil) R Camargo	1	4
(Brazil) E Oncins (Brazil) J Oncins	4	2
3	(Brazil) **L Mattar** (Brazil) **C Motta**	**6**	**6**
(Brazil) **E Furusho** (Canada) **M Wostenholme**	6	**7**	**6**
(Brazil) R Jabali (Brazil) J Soares	**7**	5	4
(Brazil) M Hennemann (Brazil) E Oliveira	3	**7**	3
2	(Brazil) **R Acioly** (Brazil) **D Campos**	**6**	6	**6**

Quarterfinals
1	(United States) T Witsken (Peru) J Yzaga
(Brazil) **N Aerts** (Brazil) **A Hocevar**	**w/o**
(Brazil) **C Kist** (Brazil) **M Menezes**	**7**	3	**6**
(Argentina) J L Clerc (Argentina) J Frana	6	**6**	3
(Argentina) E Bengoechea (Brazil) J Daher
3	(Brazil) **L Mattar** (Brazil) **C Motta**	**w/o**
(Brazil) E Furusho (Canada) M Wostenholme	2	**6**	3
2	(Brazil) **R Acioly** (Brazil) **D Campos**	**6**	4	**6**

Semifinals
(Brazil) N Aerts (Brazil) A Hocevar	4	**6**	6
(Brazil) **C Kist** (Brazil) **M Menezes**	**6**	3	**7**
3	(Brazil) L Mattar (Brazil) C Motta	3	2
2	(Brazil) **R Acioly** (Brazil) **D Campos**	**6**	**6**

Final
(Brazil) César Kist (Brazil) Mauro Menezes	6	6
2	(Brazil) **Ricardo Acioly** (Brazil) **Dacio Campos**	**7**	**7**
