= 1990 Chevrolet Classic – Singles =

Singles
- 1990 Chevrolet Classic

Final
- Champion: (Argentina) Martín Jaite
- Runner-up: (Brazil) Luiz Mattar
- Score: 3–6, 6–4, 6–3

Details
- Draw: 32 (3WC/4Q/1LL)
- Seeds: 8

Events
Singles	Doubles
← 1989 ·	Guarujá Open	· 1991 →

Luiz Mattar was the defending champion, but lost in the final to Martín Jaite. The score was 3–6, 6–4, 6–3.

== Seeds ==
1. (United States) Jay Berger (quarterfinals)
2. (Argentina) Martín Jaite (champion)
3. (Peru) Jaime Yzaga (first round)
4. (Brazil) Luiz Mattar (final)
5. (Uruguay) ~~Diego Pérez~~ (withdrew)
6. (Brazil) Cássio Motta (quarterfinals)
7. (Argentina) Eduardo Bengoechea (semifinals)
8. (Argentina) Horacio de la Peña (second round)

== Draw ==
=== Key ===
- Q = Qualifier
- WC = Wild card
- LL = Lucky loser
- Alt = Alternate
- SE = Special exempt
- PR = Protected ranking
- ITF = ITF entry
- JE = Junior exempt
- w/o = Walkover
- r = Retired
- d = Defaulted
- SR = Special ranking

=== Finals ===
Semifinals
7	(Argentina) Eduardo Bengoechea	4	2
4	(Brazil) Luiz Mattar	6	6
WC	(Brazil) Alexandre Hocevar	2	6	3
2	(Argentina) Martín Jaite	6	3	6

Final
4	(Brazil) Luiz Mattar	6	4	3
2	(Argentina) Martín Jaite	3	6	6

=== Top half ===
First Round
1	(United States) J Berger	6	6
Q	(Brazil) N Aerts	4	1
(Brazil) M Menezes	7^{9}	1	5
(Argentina) G Markus	6^{7}	6	7
(Germany) P Ballauff	2	6	6
(Argentina) F Yunis	6	4	1
WC	(Brazil) J Oncins	2	4
7	(Argentina) E Bengoechea	6	6
4	(Brazil) L Mattar	7	6
(Brazil) F Roese	5	3
(Chile) P Rebolledo	4	0
Q	(West Germany) H Rittersbacher	6	6
(Peru) A Aramburú	2	6	6
(Canada) M Wostenholme	6	4	4
WC	(Brazil) J Zwetsch	6	4	4
LL	(Brazil) I Kley	3	6	6

Second Round
1	(United States) J Berger	6	6
(Argentina) G Markus	3	0
(Germany) P Ballauff	4	5
7	(Argentina) E Bengoechea	6	7
4	(Brazil) L Mattar	4	7^{11}	6
Q	(West Germany) H Rittersbacher	6	6^{9}	4
(Peru) A Aramburú	3	4
LL	(Brazil) I Kley	6	6

Quarterfinals
1	(United States) J Berger	5	0
7	(Argentina) E Bengoechea	7	6
4	(Brazil) L Mattar	6	6
LL	(Brazil) I Kley	3	2

Semifinals
7	(Argentina) E Bengoechea	4	2
4	(Brazil) L Mattar	6	6

=== Bottom half ===
First Round
6	(Brazil) C Motta	3	6	6
(West Germany) C Saceanu	6	2	1
(Brazil) D Marcelino	4	0
(Puerto Rico) M Nido	6	6
WC	(Brazil) A Hocevar	6	6
Q	(Brazil) O Della	0	4
(Cuba) M Tabares	7^{7}	7^{7}
3	(Peru) J Yzaga	6^{5}	6^{4}
8	(Argentina) H de la Peña	6	6
(Argentina) G Rivas	2	3
(Germany) P Vojtíšek	6	6
(United States) J Tarango	4	3
Q	(United States) J Sobel	5	6	6
(Argentina) R Argüello	7	4	4
(Argentina) J Frana	6^{3}	3
2	(Argentina) M Jaite	7^{7}	6

Second Round
6	(Brazil) C Motta	6	6
(Puerto Rico) M Nido	4	1
WC	(Brazil) A Hocevar	5	6	6
(Cuba) M Tabares	7	0	4
8	(Argentina) H de la Peña	6^{4}	1^{r}
(Germany) P Vojtíšek	7^{7}	3
Q	(United States) J Sobel	1	2
2	(Argentina) M Jaite	6	6

Quarterfinals
6	(Brazil) C Motta	4	1
WC	(Brazil) A Hocevar	6	6
(Germany) P Vojtíšek	5	2
2	(Argentina) M Jaite	7	6

Semifinals
WC	(Brazil) A Hocevar	2	6	3
2	(Argentina) M Jaite	6	3	6
