= 1988 Guarujá Open – Singles =

Singles
- 1988 Guarujá Open

Final
- Champion: (Brazil) Luiz Mattar
- Runner-up: (United States) Eliot Teltscher
- Score: 6–3, 6–3

Details
- Draw: 32 (3WC/4Q)
- Seeds: 8

Events
Singles	Doubles
- Guarujá Open

Luiz Mattar successfully defended his title by defeating Eliot Teltscher 6–3, 6–3 in the final.

== Seeds ==
1. (United States) Eliot Teltscher (final)
2. (Brazil) Luiz Mattar (champion)
3. (United States) Lawson Duncan (second round)
4. (Argentina) Javier Frana (second round)
5. (Uruguay) Diego Pérez (quarterfinals)
6. (Uruguay) Marcelo Filippini (second round)
7. (Brazil) Cássio Motta (quarterfinals)
8. (Peru) Pablo Arraya (quarterfinals)

== Draw ==
Key

- Q = Qualifier
- WC = Wild card
- LL = Lucky loser
- Alt = Alternate
- ITF = ITF entry
- PR = Protected ranking
- SR = Special ranking
- SE = Special exempt
- JE = Junior exempt
- JR = Junior Accelerator Programme entrant
- CO = College Accelerator Programme entrant
- NG = Next Gen Accelerator Program entrant
- w/o = Walkover
- r = Retired
- d = Defaulted

=== Finals ===
Semifinals
1	(United States) Eliot Teltscher	6	6
(Brazil) Danilo Marcelino	1	4
(Canada) Martin Wostenholme	3	3
2	(Brazil) Luiz Mattar	6	6

Final
1	(United States) Eliot Teltscher	3	3
2	(Brazil) Luiz Mattar	6	6

=== Top half ===
First Round
1	(United States) E Teltscher	7	6
(Brazil) I Kley	5	2
WC	(Brazil) D Campos	5	4
(West Germany) P Baur	7	6
(Brazil) C Kist	2	4
(United States) B Cox	6	6
(Chile) R Acuña	4	4
8	(Peru) P Arraya	6	6
4	(Argentina) J Frana	7	7
(Brazil) J Daher	6	6
(Brazil) D Marcelino	6	6
(Argentina) G Garetto	4	3
(Brazil) G Barbosa	6	7
(Argentina) R Saad	4	5
(Brazil) J Góes	6	0	3
5	(Uruguay) D Pérez	4	6	6

Second Round
1	(United States) E Teltscher	6	6
(West Germany) P Baur	3	3
(United States) B Cox	3	3
8	(Peru) P Arraya	6	6
4	(Argentina) J Frana	5	2
(Brazil) D Marcelino	7	6
(Brazil) G Barbosa	3	3
5	(Uruguay) D Pérez	6	6

Quarterfinals
1	(United States) E Teltscher	6	7
8	(Peru) P Arraya	1	5
(Brazil) D Marcelino	4	6	6
5	(Uruguay) D Pérez	6	3	4

Semifinals
1	(United States) E Teltscher	6	6
(Brazil) D Marcelino	1	4

=== Bottom half ===
First Round
6	(Uruguay) M Filippini	6	6
WC	(Brazil) M Menezes	0	4
Q	(Brazil) N Aerts	4	1
(Canada) M Wostenholme	6	6
(Argentina) R Argüello	7	3	6
(United States) B Willenborg	5	6	3
WC	(Brazil) A Hocevar	3	1
3	(United States) L Duncan	6	6
7	(Brazil) C Motta	6	6
(West Germany) M Rackl	1	2
(Uruguay) D Montes de Oca	3	2
Q	(Brazil) R Acioly	6	6
(Sweden) R Båthman	4	6	2
Q	(Brazil) O Della	6	3	6
Q	(United States) D Kass	3	3
2	(Brazil) L Mattar	6	6

Second Round
6	(Uruguay) M Filippini	6	6	0^{r}
(Canada) M Wostenholme	2	7	0
(Argentina) R Argüello	6	6
3	(United States) L Duncan	2	4
7	(Brazil) C Motta	6	7
Q	(Brazil) R Acioly	3	5
Q	(Brazil) O Della	3	2
2	(Brazil) L Mattar	6	6

Quarterfinals
(Canada) M Wostenholme	6	7
(Argentina) R Argüello	2	6
7	(Brazil) C Motta	0	2
2	(Brazil) L Mattar	6	6

Semifinals
(Canada) M Wostenholme	3	3
2	(Brazil) L Mattar	6	6
