= Brazil Davis Cup team =

National sports team

Brazil
- Captain: Jaime Oncins
- Nations Ranking: 18 (21 September 2026)
- Colors: Yellow & Blue
- First year: 1932
- Years played: 77
- Ties played (W–L): 176 (97–79)
- Years in World Group: 19 (8–20)
- Best finish: SF (1992, 2000)
- Most total wins: Thomaz Koch (74–44)
- Most singles wins: Thomaz Koch (46–32)
- Most doubles wins: Thomaz Koch (28–12)
- Best doubles team: José Edison Mandarino / Thomaz Koch (23–9)
- Most ties played: Thomaz Koch (44)
- Most years played: Thomaz Koch (16)

The Brazil national tennis team represents Brazil in Davis Cup tennis competition and are governed by the Brazilian Tennis Confederation.

After nine years, Brazil returned to the World Group in 2013 with a defeat by the United States in the first round. Brazil also played in 2015, losing to Argentina.

== History ==
Brazil competed in its first Davis Cup in 1932.

== Results and fixtures ==
The following are lists of match results and scheduled matches for the previous year and any upcoming ties.

Win Loss Fixture

=== 2025 ===
Qualifiers
First round

France
4
Palais des Sports, Orléans, France
1–2 February 2025
Hard (i)

Brazil
0

| | | | 1 | 2 | 3 |
|---|---|---|---|---|---|---|
| 1 | (France) (Brazil) | Ugo Humbert; João Fonseca | 7; 5 | 6; 3 |
| 2 | (France) (Brazil) | Arthur Fils; Thiago Seyboth Wild | 6; 1 | 6; 4 |
| 3 | (France) (Brazil) | Benjamin Bonzi / Pierre-Hugues Herbert; Rafael Matos / Marcelo Melo | 4; 6 | 6; 3 | 6; 4 |
| 4 | (France) (Brazil) | Giovanni Mpetshi Perricard; Matheus Pucinelli de Almeida | 6; 4 | 6; 4 |
| 5 | (France) (Brazil) | Arthur Fils; João Fonseca | | | | not played |

World Group I

Greece
1
Athens Olympic Tennis Centre, Athens, Greece
13–14 September 2025
Hard

Brazil
3

| | | | 1 | 2 | 3 |
|---|---|---|---|---|---|---|
| 1 | (Greece) (Brazil) | Stefanos Sakellaridis; João Fonseca | 5; 7 | 3; 6 |
| 2 | (Greece) (Brazil) | Stefanos Tsitsipas; Thiago Seyboth Wild | 6; 2 | 6; 1 |
| 3 | (Greece) (Brazil) | Aristotelis Thanos / Petros Tsitsipas; Rafael Matos / Marcelo Melo | 2; 6 | 2; 6 |
| 4 | (Greece) (Brazil) | Stefanos Tsitsipas; João Fonseca | 4; 6 | 6; 3 | 5; 7 |
| 5 | (Greece) (Brazil) | Stefanos Sakellaridis; Thiago Seyboth Wild | | | | not played |

=== 2026 ===
Qualifiers
First round

Canada
3
Thunderbird Sports Centre, Vancouver, Canada
6–7 February 2026
Hard (indoors)

Brazil
2

| | | | 1 | 2 | 3 |
|---|---|---|---|---|---|
| 1 | (Canada) (Brazil) | Liam Draxl; João Lucas Reis da Silva | 6; 3 | 6; 3 |
| 2 | (Canada) (Brazil) | Gabriel Diallo; Gustavo Heide | 6^{4} 7^{7} | 6; 3 | 6^{3} 7^{7} |
| 3 | (Canada) (Brazil) | Liam Draxl / Cleeve Harper; Orlando Luz / Rafael Matos | 6; 3 | 4; 6 | 5; 7 |
| 4 | (Canada) (Brazil) | Gabriel Diallo; Matheus Pucinelli de Almeida | 3; 6 | 6; 1 | 7^{7} 6^{4} |
| 5 | (Canada) (Brazil) | Liam Draxl; Gustavo Heide | 6; 3 | 6; 4 |

World Group I

Brazil
3
Farmasi Arena, Rio de Janeiro, Brazil
18–19 September 2026
Hard (indoors)

Switzerland
1

| | | | 1 | 2 | 3 |
|---|---|---|---|---|---|---|
| 1 | (Brazil) (Switzerland) | João Fonseca; Dominic Stricker | 4; 6 | 6; 3 | 6; 2 |
| 2 | (Brazil) (Switzerland) | Gustavo Heide; Stan Wawrinka | 4; 6 | 7^{7} 6^{4} | 6; 4 |
| 3 | (Brazil) (Switzerland) | Orlando Luz / Rafael Matos; Jakub Paul / Dominic Stricker | 7^{7} 6^{1} | 6; 2 |
| 4 | (Brazil) (Switzerland) | Matheus Pucinelli de Almeida; Rémy Bertola | 6; 3 | 4; 6 | [8] [10] |
| 5 | (Brazil) (Switzerland) | Gustavo Heide; Dominic Stricker | | | | not played |

== Players ==
=== Current team ===
The current team for the 2025 Davis Cup is:

- Thiago Seyboth Wild (singles)
- João Fonseca (singles)
- Matheus Pucinelli de Almeida (singles)
- Rafael Matos (doubles)
- Marcelo Melo (doubles)
Current team (2025)

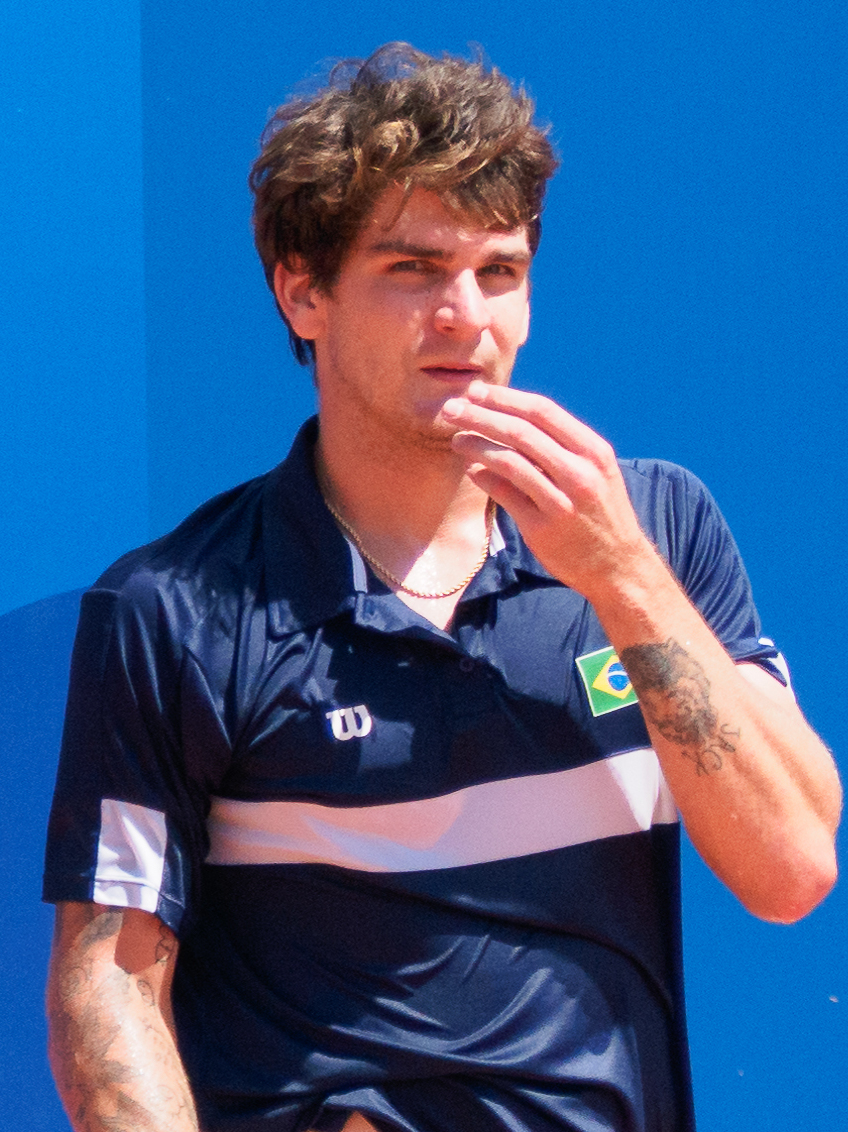
Thiago Seyboth Wild

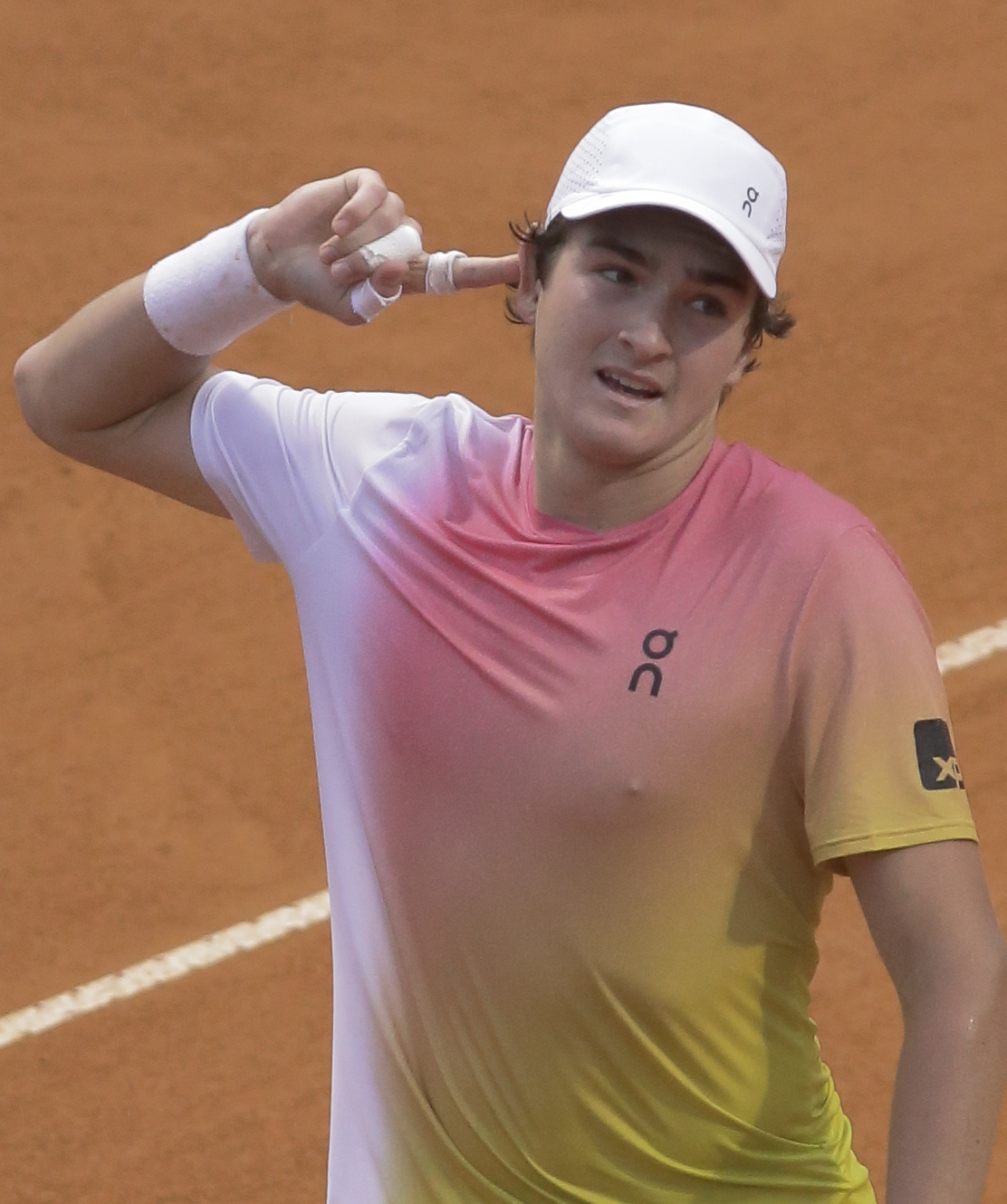
João Fonseca

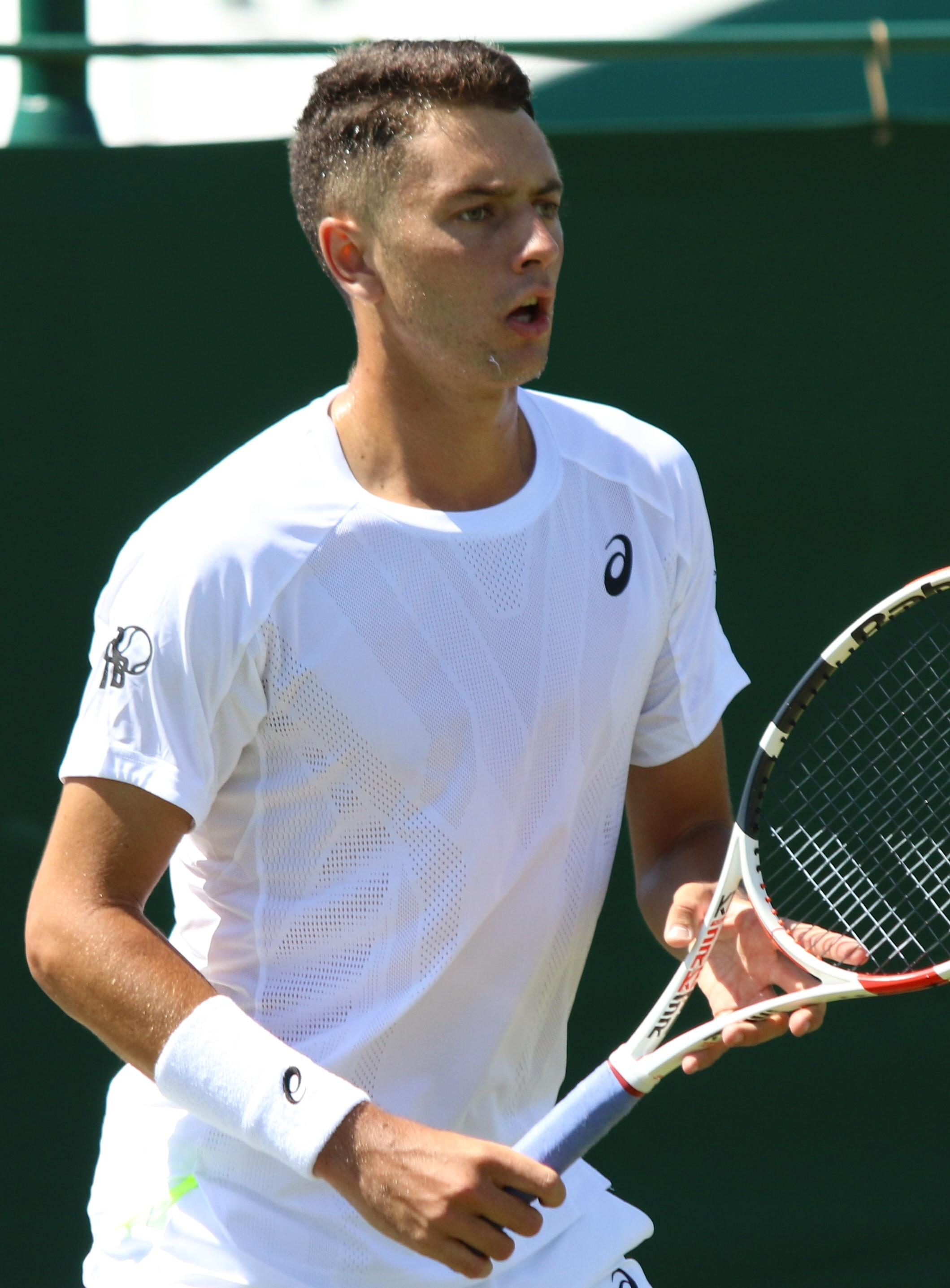
Matheus Pucinelli de Almeida

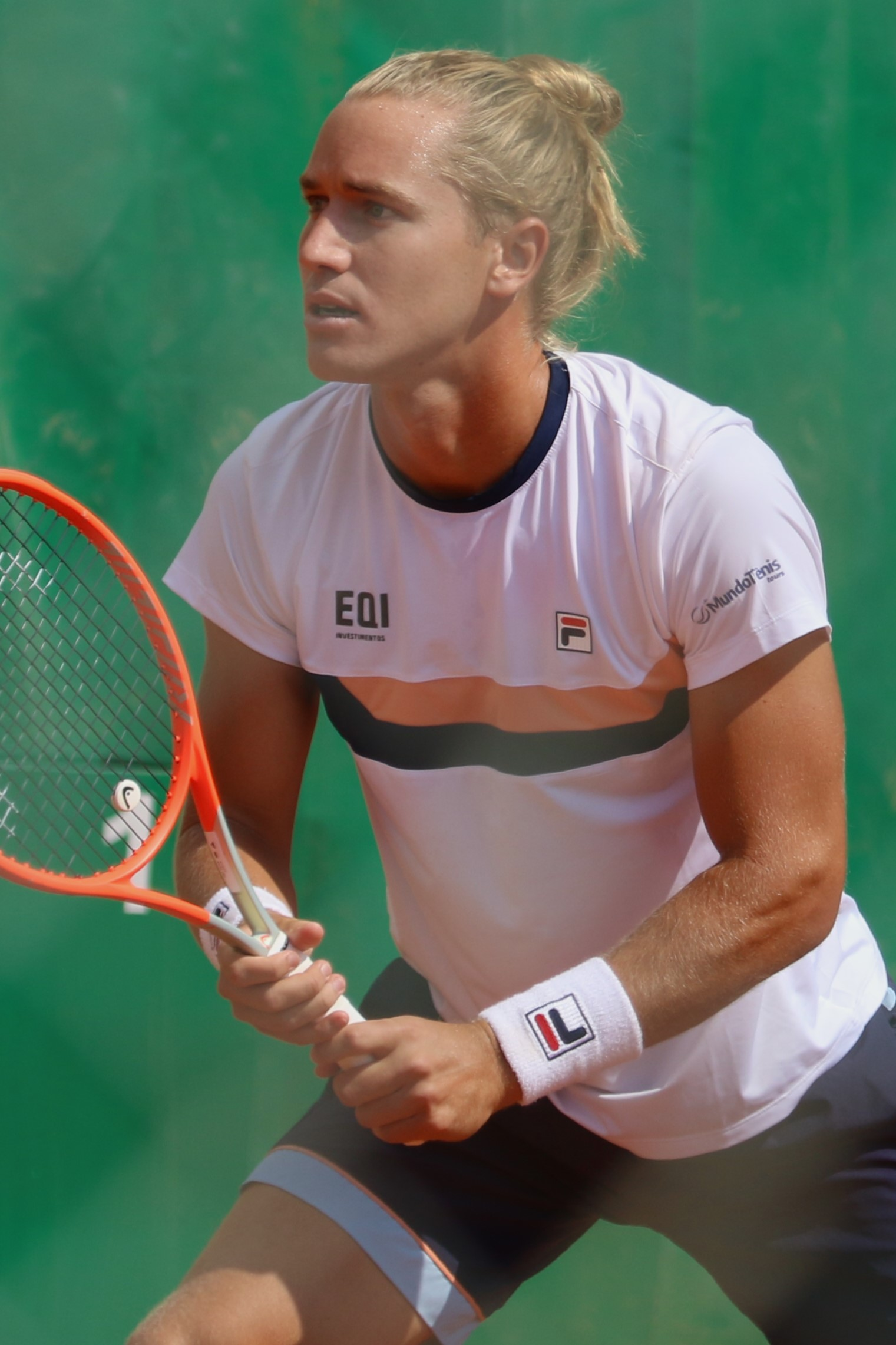
Rafael Matos

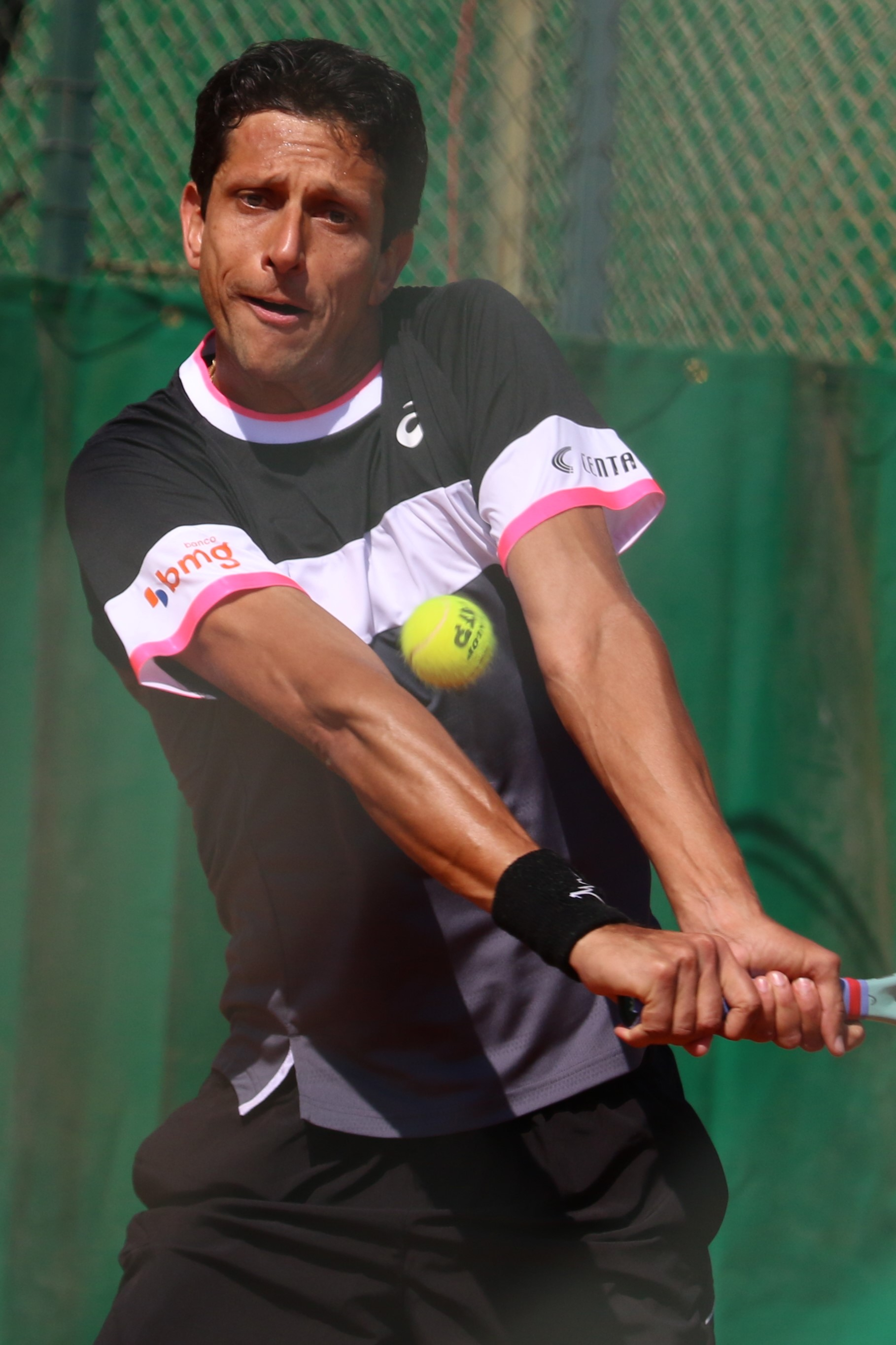
Marcelo Melo

== Historical results ==
=== Best results ===
| Year | Competition | Date | Location | Opponent | Score | Result |
|---|---|---|---|---|---|---|
| 1992 | World Group, 1st Round | 2–4 February | Rio de Janeiro, Brazil | Germany | 3–1 | Won |
| 1992 | World Group, Quarterfinals | 29–31 March | Maceio, Brazil | Italy | 3–1 | Won |
| 1992 | World Group, Semifinals | 27–29 September | Geneve, Switzerland | Switzerland | 0–5 | Lost |
| 2000 | World Group, 1st Round | 6–8 February | Florianópolis, Brazil | France | 4–1 | Won |
| 2000 | World Group, Quarterfinals | 9–11 April | Rio de Janeiro, Brazil | Slovakia | 3–2 | Won |
| 2000 | World Group, Semifinals | 16–18 July | Brisbane, Australia | Australia | 0–5 | Lost |

=== Other results: 2008–2022 ===
| Year | Competition | Date | Location | Opponent | Score | Result |
|---|---|---|---|---|---|---|
| 2008 | Americas Zone, Group I, 1st Round | 8–10 February | bye | | | |
| 2008 | Americas Zone, Group I, 2nd Round | 13–15 April | Sorocaba, Brazil | Colombia | 4–1 | Won |
| 2008 | World Group, Playoffs | 21–23 September | Zadar, Croatia | Croatia | 1–4 | Lost |
| 2009 | Americas Zone, Group I, 1st Round | 6–8 March | bye | | | |
| 2009 | Americas Zone, Group I, 2nd Round | 10–12 May | Tunja, Colombia | Colombia | 4–1 | Won |
| 2009 | World Group, Playoffs | 20–22 September | Porto Alegre, Brazil | Ecuador | 2–3 | Lost |
| 2010 | Americas Zone, Group I, 1st Round | 5–7 March | bye | | | |
| 2010 | Americas Zone, Group I, 2nd Round | 09–11 May | Bauru, Brazil | Uruguay | 5–0 | Won |
| 2010 | World Group Playoffs | 19–21 September | Chennai, India | India | 2–3 | Lost |
| 2011 | Americas Zone, Group I, 1st Round | 4–6 March | bye | | | |
| 2011 | Americas Zone, Group I, 2nd Round | 8–10 Jul | Montevideo, Uruguay | Uruguay | 5–0 | Won |
| 2011 | World Group Playoffs | 16–18 September | Kazan, Russia | Russia | 2–3 | Lost |
| 2012 | Americas Zone, Group I, 1st Round | 10–12 February | bye | | | |
| 2012 | Americas Zone, Group I, 2nd Round | 6–8 April | São José do Rio Preto, Brazil | Colombia | 4–1 | Won |
| 2012 | World Group Playoffs | 14–16 September | São José do Rio Preto, Brazil | Russia | 5–0 | Won |
| 2013 | World Group, 1st Round | 1–3 February | Jacksonville, United States | United States | 2-3 | Lost |
| 2013 | World Group Playoffs | 13–15 September | Ulm, Germany | Germany | 1-4 | Lost |
| 2014 | Americas Zone, Group I, 1st Round | 31–2 February | bye | | | |
| 2014 | Americas Zone, Group I, 2nd Round | 4–6 April | Guayaquil, Ecuador | Ecuador | 3–1 | Won |
| 2014 | World Group Playoffs | 12–14 September | São Paulo, Brazil | Spain | 3–1 | Won |
| 2015 | World Group, 1st Round | 6–8 March | Buenos Aires, Argentina | Argentina | 2–3 | Lost |
| 2015 | World Group Playoffs | 18–20 September | Florianópolis, Brazil | Croatia | 1–3 | Lost |
| 2016 | Americas Zone, Group I, 1st Round | 4–6 March | bye | | | |
| 2016 | Americas Zone, Group I, 2nd Round | 15–18 July | Belo Horizonte, Brazil | Ecuador | 3–1 | Won |
| 2016 | World Group Playoffs | 16–18 September | Ostend, Belgium | Belgium | 0–4 | Lost |
| 2017 | Americas Zone, Group I, 1st Round | 3–5 February | bye | | | |
| 2017 | Americas Zone, Group I, 2nd Round | 7–9 April | Ambato, Ecuador | Ecuador | 5-0 | Won |
| 2017 | World Group Playoffs | 15–17 September | Osaka, Japan | Japan | 1-3 | Lost |
| 2018 | Americas Zone, Group I, 1st Round | 2–3 February | Santo Domingo, Dominican Republic | Dominican Republic | 3-2 | Won |
| 2018 | Americas Zone, Group I, 2nd Round | 6–7 April | Barranquilla, Colombia | Colombia | 2-3 | Lost |
| 2019 | World Group Qualifiers | 1–2 February | Uberlândia, Brazil | Belgium | 1-3 | Lost |
| 2019 | Americas Zone, Group I | 13–14 September | Criciúma, Brazil | Barbados | 3–1 | Won |
| 2020–21 | World Group Qualifiers | 6–7 March | Adelaide, Australia | Australia | 1–3 | Lost |
| 2020–21 | World Group I | 18–19 September | Jounieh, Lebanon | Lebanon | 4–0 | Won |
| 2022 | Qualifying Round | 4–5 March | Rio de Janeiro, Brazil | Germany | 1–3 | Lost |
| 2022 | World Group 1 | 16–17 September | Viana do Castelo, Portugal | Portugal | 1–3 | Lost |

== Former squad members ==
Active single players listed in bold and active double players listed also in italic; active player rankings (in parentheses) as of February 22, 2016

| Player | First year played | Years played | Number of ties | Total W–L | Singles W–L | Doubles W–L |
|---|---|---|---|---|---|---|
| Thomaz Koch | (1962) | 16 | 44 | 74–44 | 46–32 | 28–12 |
| José Edison Mandarino | (1961) | 15 | 43 | 68–42 | 41–31 | 27–11 |
| Carlos Kirmayr | (1971) | 14 | 28 | 34–22 | 17–15 | 17–7 |
| Cássio Motta | (1979) | 11 | 27 | 28–21 | 13–16 | 15–5 |
| Jaime Oncins | (1991) | 11 | 25 | 23–14 | 12–8 | 11–6 |
| Gustavo Kuerten | (1996) | 11 | 23 | 34–18 | 21–11 | 13–7 |
| Luiz Mattar | (1986) | 9 | 20 | 20–18 | 16–15 | 4–3 |
| Fernando Meligeni | (1993) | 10 | 19 | 13–16 | 13–16 | 0–0 |
| André Sá | (1997) | 9 | 18 | 14–10 | 4–4 | 10–6 |
| Carlos Alberto Fernandes | (1957) | 8 | 16 | 25–15 | 16–10 | 9–5 |
| **Thomaz Bellucci (35)** | (2007) | 10 | 18 | 18–13 | 19–14 | 1–0 |
| **Marcelo Melo (1)** | (2008) | 8 | 15 | 13–3 | 1–0 | 12–3 |
| Ronald Barnes | (1958) | 8 | 14 | 16–18 | 1–7 | 9–5 |
| **Bruno Soares (10)** | (2005) | 7 | 13 | 13–2 | 2–0 | 11–2 |
| Fernando Roese | (1982) | 8 | 13 | 6–9 | 2–1 | 4–8 |
| Marcos Hocevar | (1978) | 5 | 10 | 7–9 | 7–8 | 0–1 |
| Flávio Saretta | (2002) | 5 | 10 | 10–5 | 9–5 | 1–0 |
| Ricardo Mello | (2005) | 4 | 10 | 8–6 | 8–6 | 0–0 |
| Luis Felipe Tavares | (1966) | 7 | 9 | 5–7 | 4–5 | 1–2 |
| Armando Vieira | (1951) | 5 | 9 | 13–11 | 10–5 | 3–6 |
| Nelson Aerts | (1984) | 3 | 5 | 5–2 | 3–1 | 2–1 |
| Jose Aguero | (1955) | 3 | 5 | 2–4 | 2–4 | 0–0 |
| Marcos Daniel | (2004) | 5 | 5 | 5–2 | 4–2 | 1–0 |
| **Rogério Dutra (114)** | (2011) | 4 | 5 | 6–3 | 6–3 | 0–0 |
| Ricardo Acioly | (1987) | 3 | 4 | 1–3 | 0–0 | 1–3 |
| Robert Falkenburg | (1954) | 2 | 4 | 3–7 | 2–4 | 1–3 |
| Alexandre Simoni | (2001) | 3 | 4 | 2–3 | 0–2 | 2–1 |
| Dacio Campos | (1985) | 1 | 3 | 4–2 | 3–2 | 1–0 |
| Ney Keller | (1979) | 1 | 3 | 2–1 | 0–0 | 2–1 |
| João Souza (211) | (2012) | 2 | 3 | 2–3 | 2–3 | 0–0 |
| Danilo Marcelino | (1989) | 2 | 3 | 1–3 | 0–2 | 1–1 |
| Roberto Cardozo | (1951) | 1 | 2 | 0–2 | 0–2 | 0–0 |
| Fernando Gentil | (1976) | 2 | 2 | 2–0 | 1–0 | 1–0 |
| Júlio Góes | (1977) | 2 | 2 | 1–2 | 1–2 | 0–0 |
| Ivan Kley | (1987) | 2 | 2 | 0–5 | 0–4 | 0–1 |
| Mauro Menezes | (1990) | 2 | 2 | 1–2 | 0–1 | 1–1 |
| Ronald Moreira | (1955) | 1 | 2 | 3–2 | 2–1 | 1–1 |

== See also ==
- List of Brazil Davis Cup team representatives
- Davis Cup
- Brazil Billie Jean King Cup team
- Brazilian Tennis Confederation
