= 1989 Guarujá Open =

Tennis tournament

- Date: 6–13 February
- Edition: 4th
- Category: Grand Prix
- Draw: 32S / 16D
- Prize money: $100,000
- Surface: Clay / outdoor
- Location: Guarujá, Brazil

Champions

Singles
- (Brazil) Luiz Mattar

Doubles
- (Brazil) Ricardo Acioly / (Brazil) Dacio Campos
← 1988 ·	Guarujá Open	· 1990 →

The 1989 Guarujá Open was a men's tennis tournament held in Guarujá in Brazil and played on outdoor clay courts. It was part of the 1989 Nabisco Grand Prix. The tournament took place from 6 February through 13 February 1989. First-seeded Luiz Mattar won his second consecutive singles title at the event.

== Finals ==
=== Singles ===
(Brazil) Luiz Mattar defeated (United States) Jimmy Brown 7–6, 6–4

- It was Mattar's 1st title of the year and the 5th of his career.

=== Doubles ===
(Brazil) Ricardo Acioly / (Brazil) Dacio Campos defeated (Brazil) César Kist / (Brazil) Mauro Menezes 7–6, 7–6

- It was Acioly's only title of the year and the 3rd of his career. It was Campos' only title of the year and the 1st of his career.
