= Héctor Ortiz (tennis) =

Mexican tennis player

- Country (sports): Mexico
- Born: 2 April 1961; Mexico City, Mexico
- Died: 27 July 2010 (aged 49); Naucalpan, Mexico
- Height: 5 ft 11 in (180 cm)

Singles
- Career record: 0–1
- Highest ranking: No. 269 (15 September 1986)

Grand Slam singles results
- Wimbledon: Q2 (1986)

Doubles
- Career record: 0–0
- Highest ranking: No. 355 (18 May 1987)

Héctor Ortiz (2 April 1961—27 July 2010) was a Mexican professional tennis player.

Born in Mexico City, Ortiz attended La Jolla High School in the late 1970s, before playing collegiate tennis for Pepperdine University. On the professional tour he reached a career high singles ranking of 269, played in qualifiers at Wimbledon and made the main draw of the 1987 Guarujá Open. He won one ATP Challenger tournament as a doubles player.

Ortiz died of a heart attack in 2010 while playing tennis at the Reforma Athletic Club in Naucalpan, Mexico.

== Challenger titles ==
=== Doubles: (1) ===
No.	Date	Tournament	Surface	Partner	Opponent	Score
1.	1986	Knokke, Belgium	Clay	(Brazil) Danilo Marcelino	(Belgium) Alain Brichant (Belgium) Jan Vanlangendonck	6–4, 6–7, 6–3
