= 1988 Guarujá Open =

- Date: 25 January – 1 February
- Edition: 3rd
- Category: Grand Prix
- Draw: 32S / 16D
- Prize money: $100,000
- Surface: Clay / outdoor
- Location: Guarujá, Brazil

Champions

Singles
- (Brazil) Luiz Mattar

Doubles
- (Chile) Ricardo Acuña / (United States) Luke Jensen
← 1987 ·	Guarujá Open	· 1989 →

The 1988 Guarujá Open was a men's tennis tournament held in Guarujá, Brazil and played on outdoor clay courts. It was part of the 1988 Nabisco Grand Prix. It was the third edition of the tournament and took place from 25 January through 1 February 1988. Second-seeded Luiz Mattar won the singles title.

== Finals ==
=== Singles ===
(Brazil) Luiz Mattar defeated (United States) Eliot Teltscher 6–3, 6–3

- It was Mattar's only title of the year and the 4th of his career.

=== Doubles ===
(Chile) Ricardo Acuña / (United States) Luke Jensen defeated (Argentina) Javier Frana / (Uruguay) Diego Pérez 6–1, 6–4

- It was Acuña's only title of the year and the 3rd of his career. It was Jensen's only title of the year and the 1st of his career.
