= Eleutério Martins =

Brazilian tennis player

- Country (sports): Brazil
- Prize money: $23,085

Singles
- Career record: 0–3
- Highest ranking: No. 171 (11 Nov 1985)

Doubles
- Career record: 1–4
- Highest ranking: No. 178 (18 Nov 1985)

Eleutério Martins is a Brazilian former professional tennis player. He also goes by the name "Chipanza".

Martins, raised in Porto Alegre, was a collegiate tennis player for Mississippi State University, where he was twice named All-SEC. He was active on the professional tour during the 1980s, featuring regularly on the ATP Challenger Tour. In 1987 he won an ATP Challenger doubles title in São Paulo. His best ranking in singles was 171 in the world.

== ATP Challenger titles ==
=== Doubles: (1) ===
No.	Date	Tournament	Surface	Partner	Opponents	Score
1.	Aug 1987	São Paulo, Brazil	Clay	(Brazil) José Daher	(Brazil) Ricardo Acioly (Brazil) Dácio Campos	6–3, 7–6
