= Ricardo Camargo =

Brazilian tennis player

- Full name: Ricardo Camargo
- Country (sports): Brazil
- Born: 14 May 1968 (age 56); São Paulo, Brazil
- Height: 180 cm (5 ft 11 in)
- Prize money: $40,506

Singles
- Career record: 1–2
- Highest ranking: No. 435 (9 March 1987)

Doubles
- Career record: 4–11
- Highest ranking: No. 206 (9 July 1990)

Ricardo Camargo (born 14 May 1968) is a former professional tennis player from Brazil.

== Biography ==
Camargo, who comes from São Paulo, was a Wimbledon semi-finalist as a junior, in the boys' doubles event in 1986.

On the professional tour he competed mostly in doubles and reached three quarter-finals on the Grand Prix/ATP Tour doubles circuit. At Challenger level he won three doubles titles, all with Givaldo Barbosa in the 1988 season. He made the second round of the singles event at the Guaruja Grand Prix tournament in 1989, with a win over Ivan Kley.

He now works as a tennis event promoter.

== Challenger titles ==
=== Doubles: (3) ===
No.	Year	Tournament	Surface	Partner	Opponents	Score
1.	1988	São Paulo-3, Brazil	Clay	(Brazil) Givaldo Barbosa	(Brazil) Alexandre Hocevar (Brazil) Marcos Hocevar	5–7, 7–6, 7–6
2.	1988	Lins, Brazil	Clay	(Brazil) Givaldo Barbosa	(Brazil) Marcelo Hennemann (Brazil) Edvaldo Oliveira	6–1, 3–6, 6–3
3.	1988	São Paulo-4, Brazil	Clay	(Brazil) Givaldo Barbosa	(Argentina) Pablo Albano (Brazil) César Kist	6–7, 7–6, 6–4
