= 1990 Chevrolet Classic =

- Date: 5–12 February
- Edition: 5th
- Category: World Series
- Draw: 32S / 16D
- Prize money: $125,000
- Surface: Hard / outdoor
- Location: Guarujá, Brazil
- Venue: Hotel Jequitimar

Champions

Singles
- (Argentina) Martín Jaite

Doubles
- (Argentina) Javier Frana / (Argentina) Gustavo Luza
- Guarujá Open

The 1990 Chevrolet Classic, also known as the Guarujá Open, was a men's tennis tournament held in Guarujá in Brazil and played on outdoor hardcourts. It was part of the World Series of the 1990 ATP Tour. It was the fifth edition of the tournament and took place from 5 February through 12 February 1990. Second-seeded Martín Jaite won the singles title.

== Finals ==
=== Singles ===
(Argentina) Martín Jaite defeated (Brazil) Luiz Mattar 3–6, 6–4, 6–3

- It was Jaite's 1st singles title of the year and the 10th of his career.

=== Doubles ===
(Argentina) Javier Frana / (Argentina) Gustavo Luza defeated (Brazil) Luiz Mattar / (Brazil) Cássio Motta 7–6, 7–6

- It was Frana's only title of the year and the 2nd of his career. It was Luza's 1st title of the year and the 2nd of his career.
