= 1983 Guarujá Open =

- Date: 24–31 January
- Edition: 1st
- Surface: Clay / outdoor
- Location: Guarujá, Brazil

Champions

Singles
- (Argentina) José Luis Clerc

Doubles
- (United States) Tim Gullikson / (Czechoslovakia) Tomáš Šmíd
Guarujá Open	· 1987 →

The 1983 Guarujá Open was a tennis tournament held in Guarujá in Brazil and played on clay courts. It was part of the 1983 Volvo Grand Prix. The tournament took place from 24 January through 31 January 1983.

== Finals ==
=== Singles ===
(Argentina) José Luis Clerc defeated (Sweden) Mats Wilander 3–6, 7–5, 6–1

- It was Clerc's 1st title of the year and the 23rd of his career.

=== Doubles ===
(United States) Tim Gullikson / (Czechoslovakia) Tomáš Šmíd defeated (Israel) Shlomo Glickstein / (United States) Van Winitsky 6–4, 6–7, 6–4

- It was Gullikson's 1st title of the year and the 16th of his career. It was Šmíd's 1st title of the year and the 22nd of his career.
