= Danilo Marcelino =

Brazilian tennis player

- Country (sports): Brazil
- Residence: São Paulo, Brazil
- Born: 8 March 1966 (age 59); Salvador, Bahia, Brazil
- Height: 1.93 m (6 ft 4 in)
- Turned pro: 1986
- Plays: Right-handed
- Prize money: $419,467

Singles
- Career record: 29–57
- Career titles: 0
- Highest ranking: No. 91 (7 October 1991)

Grand Slam singles results
- Australian Open: 2R (1989)
- French Open: 1R (1989)
- Wimbledon: 1R (1991)

Doubles
- Career record: 40–56
- Career titles: 0
- Highest ranking: No. 73 (17 July 1989)

Grand Slam doubles results
- Australian Open: 2R (1989)
- French Open: 1R (1988, 1989)
- Wimbledon: 2R (1989)
- US Open: 3R (1990)

Danilo Marcelino (born 8 March 1966) is a former professional tennis player from Brazil.

== Career ==
Marcelino entered the singles draw of a Grand Slam on four occasions but only once progressed past the opening round, which was at the 1989 Australian Open, defeating Jan Apell in five sets. In the second round he was eliminated in straight sets by Mark Woodforde. He had more success in the men's doubles, with a best showing coming at the 1990 US Open, where he and countryman Nelson Aerts made the third round. En route they defeated number one seeds Rick Leach and Jim Pugh.

On the ATP Tour he made his only final at the 1989 Italian Open, with double's partner Mauro Menezes. His best singles achievements include reaching the semi-finals of the Guarujá Open in 1988 and 1989, making the semi-finals at São Paulo in 1990 and the semi-finals at Brasília the following year. He claimed some of the biggest scalps of his career in 1991, when he twice beat a player ranked 20 in the world, Brad Gilbert in the Volvo International and Derrick Rostagno at the Sydney Indoor Championships.

He also played some Davis Cup tennis for Brazil. In singles he lost both his matches but he won one of his two doubles rubbers. That win came in Brazil's Americas Zone relegation play-off against the Chile Davis Cup team. Partnering Mauro Menezes, the pairing defeated Cristián Araya and Pedro Rebolledo to help Brazil win the tie 4–1.

== Grand Prix career finals ==
=== Doubles: 1 (0–1) ===
Result	W/L	Date	Tournament	Surface	Partner	Opponents	Score
Loss	0–1	May 1989	Rome, Italy	Clay	(Brazil) Mauro Menezes	(United States) Jim Courier (United States) Pete Sampras	4–6, 3–6

== Challenger titles ==
=== Singles: (3) ===
No.	Year	Tournament	Surface	Opponent	Score
1.	1988	Santos, Brazil	Clay	(Brazil) Marcelo Hennemann	6–3, 3–6, 6–3
2.	1988	Lins, Brazil	Clay	(Brazil) Fernando Roese	6–3, 6–3
3.	1993	Caracas, Venezuela	Hard	(Barbados) Martin Blackman	6–4, 7–5

=== Doubles: (6) ===
No.	Year	Tournament	Surface	Partner	Opponents	Score
1.	1986	Knokke, Belgium	Clay	(Mexico) Héctor Ortiz	(Belgium) Alain Brichant (Belgium) Jan Vanlangendonck	6–4, 6–7, 6–3
2.	1988	Santos, Brazil	Clay	(Brazil) Mauro Menezes	(Spain) Francisco Clavet (Spain) José Clavet	3–6, 6–1, 6–2
3.	1988	Brasília, Brazil	Hard	(Brazil) Mauro Menezes	(Brazil) Ricardo Acioly (Brazil) Dacio Campos	4–6, 7–6, 7–5
4.	1991	Fortaleza, Brazil	Clay	(Brazil) Nelson Aerts	(Mexico) Oliver Fernández (Mexico) Gerardo Martínez	6–3, 6–4
5.	1993	São Paulo, Brazil	Clay	(Brazil) Fernando Meligeni	(Barbados) Martin Blackman (Argentina) Gastón Etlis	6–1, 7–5
6.	1994	Belo Horizonte, Brazil	Hard	(Brazil) Nelson Aerts	(Brazil) Otavio Della (Brazil) Marcelo Saliola	7–5, 6–3
