= João Zwetsch =

Brazilian tennis player

- Full name: João Zwetsch
- Country (sports): Brazil
- Born: 12 November 1968 (age 56); São Leopoldo, Brazil
- Height: 5 ft 11 in (180 cm)
- Prize money: $37,779

Singles
- Career record: 1–2
- Highest ranking: No. 231 (17 June 1991)

Doubles
- Career record: 1–2
- Highest ranking: No. 205 (5 August 1991)

João Zwetsch (born 12 November 1968) is a tennis coach and former professional tennis player from Brazil.

== Biography ==
=== Tennis career ===
Born in São Leopoldo, Zwetsch began competing on tour in the late 1980s. His best performances on tour include finishing runner-up at the Lins Challenger in 1990 and making the second round of the Brasília Open ATP Tour tournament in 1991.

Zwetsch represented Brazil at the 1995 Pan American Games, where he partnered Gustavo Kuerten in the doubles event.

=== Coaching ===
Now a tennis coach, Zwetsch is a long serving captain of the Brazil Davis Cup team, which he has led since 2010. During his tenure he has twice captained Brazil in the World Group, the first time in 2013, then again in 2015 following a playoff win over Spain in São Paulo the year before.

He has previously been the individual coach of top 50 players Thomaz Bellucci and Flávio Saretta.

Zwetsch is currently coaching Thiago Seyboth Wild.
