= Brasília Open =

Philips Cup Aberto da República

Defunct tennis tournament
- Tour: ATP Tour
- Founded: 1991
- Abolished: 1991
- Location: Brasília, Brazil
- Venue: Congresso Nacional
- Surface: Carpet

The Brasília Open (a.k.a. Philips Cup Aberto da República) is a defunct men's tennis tournament that was played on the ATP Tour for one year in 1991. The event was held in September in Brasília, Brazil and was played on outdoor carpet courts set-up on the lawn outside the Congresso Nacional. The prize money for the event was $225,000 and Andrés Gómez won the singles title.

== Finals ==
=== Singles ===
Year	Champions	Runners-up	Score
1991	(Ecuador) Andrés Gómez	(Spain) Javier Sánchez	6–4, 3–6, 6–3

=== Doubles ===
Year	Champions	Runners-up	Score
1991	(United States) Kent Kinnear (The Bahamas) Roger Smith	(Brazil) Ricardo Acioly (Brazil) Mauro Menezes	6–4, 6–3
