= Gerardo Martínez (tennis) =

Mexican tennis player

- Country (sports): Mexico
- Born: 3 August 1969 (age 55); Mexico City, Mexico
- Height: 1.78 m (5 ft 10 in)
- Prize money: $16,345

Singles
- Highest ranking: No. 817 (24 June 1991)

Doubles
- Career record: 1–5
- Highest ranking: No. 151 (18 May 1992)

Gerardo Martínez (born 3 August 1969) is a Mexican former professional tennis player.

== Biography ==
Martínez, who was born in Mexico City, turned professional in 1991 and specialised in doubles.

A right-handed player, Martínez reached a best doubles ranking of 151 in the world, with his best ATP Tour performance a quarter-final appearance at the Athens Open in 1991.

He won a silver medal for Mexico at the 1991 Pan American Games, partnering Oliver Fernández in the men's doubles.
