= 1987 Guarujá Open =

- Date: 26 January – 2 February
- Edition: 2nd
- Draw: 32S / 16D
- Prize money: $89,400
- Surface: Hard / outdoor
- Location: Guarujá, Brazil

Champions

Singles
- (Brazil) Luiz Mattar

Doubles
- (Brazil) Luiz Mattar / (Brazil) Cássio Motta
- Guarujá Open

The 1987 Guarujá Open was a men's tennis tournament held in Guarujá in Brazil and played on outdoor hard courts. It was part of the 1987 Nabisco Grand Prix. It was the second edition of the tournament and took place from 26 January through 2 February 1987. Luiz Mattar won the singles title.

== Finals ==
=== Singles ===
(Brazil) Luiz Mattar defeated (Brazil) Cássio Motta 6–3, 5–7, 6–2

- It was Mattar's first singles title of his career.

=== Doubles ===
(Brazil) Luiz Mattar / (Brazil) Cássio Motta defeated (West Germany) Martin Hipp / (West Germany) Tore Meinecke 7–6, 6–1

- It was Mattar's 1st title of the year and the 1st of his career. It was Motta's only title of the year and the 8th of his career.
