= Nelson Aerts =

Brazilian tennis player (born 1963)

- Country (sports): Brazil
- Born: 25 April 1963 (age 62) Cachoeira Do Sul, Brazil
- Height: 1.88 m (6 ft 2 in)
- Plays: Right-handed
- Prize money: $233,278

Singles
- Career record: 12–24
- Career titles: 0; 0 Challenger, 0 Futures
- Highest ranking: No. 109 (16 June 1986)

Grand Slam singles results
- Australian Open: 2R (1985)
- French Open: 2R (1986)
- Wimbledon: 1R (1986)
- US Open: Q1 (1992, 1996)

Doubles
- Career record: 45–69
- Career titles: 0; 11 Challenger, 1 Futures
- Highest ranking: No. 80 (16 April 1990)

Grand Slam doubles results
- Australian Open: 1R (1985)
- French Open: 3R (1986)
- Wimbledon: 1R (1990, 1991, 1998)
- US Open: 3R (1985, 1987, 1990)

Grand Slam mixed doubles results
- French Open: 1R (1990)
- Wimbledon: 1R (1990)
- US Open: 1R (1990)
- Last updated on: 15 April 2022.

Nelson Aerts (born 25 April 1963) is a former professional tennis player from Brazil.

Aerts was born in Cachoeira Do Sul, and found most of his tennis success while playing doubles. He achieved a career-high doubles ranking of World No. 80 in 1990.

== ATP career finals ==
=== Doubles: 3 (3 runner-ups) ===
Legend Grand Slam Tournaments (0–0) ATP World Tour Finals (0–0) ATP Masters Series (0–0) ATP Championship Series (0–0) ATP World Series (0–3)	Finals by surface Hard (0–1) Clay (0–0) Grass (0–1) Carpet (0–1)	Finals by setting Outdoors (0–1) Indoors (0–2)

Result	W–L	Date	Tournament	Tier	Surface	Partner	Opponents	Score
Loss	0–1	Dec 1985	Adelaide, Australia	World Series	Grass	(United States) Tomm Warneke	(Australia) Mark Edmondson (Australia) Dave Randall	4–6, 4–6
Loss	0–2	Apr 1990	Rio de Janeiro, Brazil	World Series	Carpet	(Brazil) Fernando Roese	(United States) Brian Garrow (United States) Sven Salumaa	5–7, 3–6
Loss	0–3	Feb 1998	San Jose, United States	World Series	Hard	(Brazil) André Sá	(Australia) Todd Woodbridge (Australia) Mark Woodforde	1–6, 5–7

== ATP Challenger and ITF Futures finals ==
=== Doubles: 25 (12–13) ===
Legend ATP Challenger (11–13) ITF Futures (1–0)	Finals by surface Hard (6–7) Clay (6–5) Grass (0–0) Carpet (0–1)

Result	W–L	Date	Tournament	Tier	Surface	Partner	Opponents	Score
Loss	0–1	Feb 1989	São Paulo, Brazil	Challenger	Clay	(Brazil) Alexandre Hocevar	(Brazil) Marcelo Hennemann (Brazil) Edvaldo Oliveira	3–6, 3–6
Loss	0–2	Apr 1989	Itu, Brazil	Challenger	Hard	(Brazil) Alexandre Hocevar	(United States) Kent Kinnear (United States) David Wheaton	3–6, 4–6
Win	1–2	Jul 1989	Campos do Jordão, Brazil	Challenger	Hard	(Brazil) Fernando Roese	(Mexico) Stefan Dallwitz (Argentina) Daniel Orsanic	6–3, 7–6
Win	2–2	Aug 1989	São Paulo, Brazil	Challenger	Clay	(Brazil) Fernando Roese	(Brazil) Dácio Campos (Cuba) Mario Tabares	2–6, 6–4, 6–4
Win	3–2	Apr 1990	Brasília, Brazil	Challenger	Hard	(Brazil) Fernando Roese	(Italy) Simone Colombo (Brazil) César Kist	6–3, 7–5
Loss	3–3	Jul 1990	Campos do Jordão, Brazil	Challenger	Hard	(Brazil) Fernando Roese	(Brazil) Jose Daher (Brazil) Jaime Oncins	6–7, 4–6
Loss	3–4	Aug 1990	Brasília, Brazil	Challenger	Carpet	(Brazil) Ricardo Acioly	(Brazil) Fernando Roese (Brazil) Luiz Mattar	6–4, 3–6, 6–7
Loss	3–5	Nov 1990	São Paulo, Brazil	Challenger	Clay	(Brazil) Danilo Marcelino	(South Africa) Richard Lubner (United States) Francisco Montana	4–6, 6–7
Loss	3–6	Apr 1991	Birmingham, United States	Challenger	Clay	(Brazil) Danilo Marcelino	(United States) Mark Keil (United States) Dave Randall	6–1, 6–7, 2–6
Loss	3–7	May 1991	São Paulo, Brazil	Challenger	Hard	(Brazil) Fernando Roese	(Brazil) Ricardo Acioly (Brazil) Mauro Menezes	3–6, 6–3, 3–6
Win	4–7	Jul 1991	Gramado, Brazil	Challenger	Hard	(Brazil) Fernando Roese	(Haiti) Bertrand Madsen (Mexico) Gerardo Martinez	6–4, 6–4
Loss	4–8	Jul 1991	Campos do Jordão, Brazil	Challenger	Hard	(Brazil) Danilo Marcelino	(Senegal) Yahiya Doumbia (France) Jean-Philippe Fleurian	3–6, 3–6
Win	5–8	Jul 1991	Fortaleza, Brazil	Challenger	Clay	(Brazil) Danilo Marcelino	(Mexico) Oliver Fernandez (Mexico) Gerardo Martinez	6–3, 6–4
Loss	5–9	Jul 1992	Gramado, Brazil	Challenger	Hard	(Brazil) Fernando Roese	(United States) Richard Matuszewski (United States) John Sullivan	6–7, 7–6, 3–6
Win	6–9	Jul 1992	Belo Horizonte, Brazil	Challenger	Clay	(Brazil) Alexandre Hocevar	(Portugal) João Cunha-Silva (Brazil) César Kist	6–1, 6–7, 6–2
Loss	6–10	Apr 1994	São Paulo, Brazil	Challenger	Clay	(Brazil) Danilo Marcelino	(Brazil) Otávio Della (Brazil) Marcelo Saliola	4–6, 2–6
Win	7–10	Aug 1994	Belo Horizonte, Brazil	Challenger	Hard	(Brazil) Danilo Marcelino	(Brazil) Otávio Della (Brazil) Marcelo Saliola	7–5, 6–3
Loss	7–11	Aug 1994	Brasília, Brazil	Challenger	Hard	(Brazil) Danilo Marcelino	(United States) Bill Barber (United States) Ivan Baron	0–6, 5–7
Loss	7–12	Feb 1997	Punta del Este, Uruguay	Challenger	Clay	(Brazil) Fernando Meligeni	(Argentina) Daniel Orsanic (Argentina) Martín Rodríguez	2–6, 4–6
Loss	7–13	Aug 1997	Belo Horizonte, Brazil	Challenger	Hard	(Brazil) André Sá	(Romania) Gabriel Trifu (United States) Glenn Weiner	6–1, 3–6, 4–6
Win	8–13	Aug 1997	Bronx, United States	Challenger	Hard	(Brazil) André Sá	(United States) Michael Sell (South Africa) Myles Wakefield	4–6, 7–5, 6–1
Win	9–13	Sep 1997	Guadalajara, Mexico	Challenger	Clay	(Brazil) André Sá	(Mexico) Alejandro Hernández (Mexico) Óscar Ortiz	3–6, 6–2, 6–4
Win	10–13	Sep 1997	São Paulo, Brazil	Challenger	Clay	(Mexico) Bernardo Martínez	(Brazil) Márcio Carlsson (Brazil) Francisco Costa	6–0, 6–0
Win	11–13	Nov 1997	Guadalajara, Mexico	Challenger	Clay	(Brazil) André Sá	(Canada) Bobby Kokavec (Mexico) Marco Osorio	7–6, 6–3
Win	12–13	Aug 1998	Brazil F2, Campos do Jordão	Futures	Hard	(Brazil) Cristiano Testa	(Brazil) Ricardo Schlachter (Japan) Thomas Shimada	6–4, 3–6, 6–4

== Performance timelines ==
Key
W	F	SF	QF	#R	RR	Q#	DNQ	A	NH

(W) winner; (F) finalist; (SF) semifinalist; (QF) quarterfinalist; (#R) rounds 4, 3, 2, 1; (RR) round-robin stage; (Q#) qualification round; (DNQ) did not qualify; (A) absent; (NH) not held; (SR) strike rate (events won / competed); (W–L) win–loss record.

=== Singles ===
Tournament	1985	1986	1987	1988	1989	1990	1991	1992	1993	1994	1995	1996	SR	W–L	Win %
Grand Slam tournaments
Australian Open	2R	A	A	A	A	A	A	A	A	A	A	A	0 / 1	0–1	0%
French Open	A	2R	A	A	A	A	A	A	A	A	A	Q1	0 / 1	1–1	50%
Wimbledon	A	1R	Q1	A	Q1	Q1	Q1	A	A	A	A	A	0 / 1	0–1	0%
US Open	A	A	A	A	A	A	A	Q1	A	A	A	Q1	0 / 0	0–0	–
Win–loss	0–1	1–2	0–0	0–0	0–0	0–0	0–0	0–0	0–0	0–0	0–0	0–0	0 / 3	1–3	25%
ATP Masters Series
Miami	A	2R	A	A	A	A	A	A	Q1	A	A	A	0 / 1	1–1	50%
Rome	A	1R	A	A	A	A	A	A	A	A	A	A	0 / 1	0–1	0%
Canada	3R	A	A	A	A	A	A	A	A	A	A	A	0 / 1	2–1	67%
Win–loss	2–1	1–2	0–0	0–0	0–0	0–0	0–0	0–0	0–0	0–0	0–0	0–0	0 / 3	3–3	50%

=== Doubles ===
Tournament	1985	1986	1987	1988	1989	1990	1991	1992	1993	1994	1995	1996	1997	1998	SR	W–L	Win %
Grand Slam tournaments
Australian Open	1R	A	A	A	A	A	A	A	A	A	A	A	A	A	0 / 1	0–1	0%
French Open	A	3R	A	A	A	1R	A	A	A	A	A	A	A	1R	0 / 3	2–3	40%
Wimbledon	A	A	Q2	A	Q1	1R	1R	A	A	A	A	A	A	1R	0 / 3	0–3	0%
US Open	3R	2R	3R	A	A	3R	2R	A	A	Q1	A	A	A	Q2	0 / 5	8–5	62%
Win–loss	2–2	3–2	2–1	0–0	0–0	2–3	1–2	0–0	0–0	0–0	0–0	0–0	0–0	0–2	0 / 12	10–12	45%
ATP Masters Series
Miami	A	1R	1R	A	A	QF	3R	1R	Q1	A	A	A	A	1R	0 / 6	5–6	45%
Monte Carlo	A	2R	A	A	A	A	A	A	A	A	A	A	A	A	0 / 1	1–1	50%
Hanburg	A	2R	A	A	A	A	A	A	A	A	A	A	A	A	0 / 1	1–1	50%
Rome	A	1R	A	A	A	A	A	A	A	A	A	A	A	A	0 / 1	0–1	0%
Win–loss	0–0	2–4	0–1	0–0	0–0	3–1	2–1	0–1	0–0	0–0	0–0	0–0	0–0	0–1	0 / 9	7–9	44%
