= Fernando Roese =

Brazilian tennis player

- Country (sports): Brazil
- Born: 24 August 1965 (age 61) Novo Hamburgo, Brazil
- Height: 1.91 m (6 ft 3 in)
- Turned pro: 1982
- Plays: Right-handed (one-handed backhand)
- Prize money: $341,334

Singles
- Career record: 22–46
- Career titles: 0; 2 Challenger, 0 Futures
- Highest ranking: No. 92 (27 January 1992)

Grand Slam singles results
- Australian Open: 1R (1992)
- Wimbledon: 1R (1991, 1992)

Doubles
- Career record: 30–58
- Career titles: 1; 5 Challenger, 0 Futures
- Highest ranking: No. 81 (16 April 1990)

Grand Slam doubles results
- Australian Open: 1R (1992)
- French Open: 1R (1990, 1995)
- Wimbledon: 2R (1989)
- US Open: 2R (1990, 1991)
- Last updated on: 10 December 2023.

Fernando Roese (born 24 August 1965) is a former professional tennis player from Brazil.

During his career Roese won one doubles title. He achieved a career-high singles ranking of No. 92 in 1992 and a career-high doubles ranking of No. 81 in 1990.

== ATP career finals ==
=== Singles: 1 (1 runner-up) ===
Legend Grand Slam Tournaments (0–0) ATP World Tour Finals (0–0) ATP World Tour Masters Series (0–0) ATP Championship Series (0–0) ATP World Series (0–1)	Finals by surface Hard (0–1) Clay (0–0) Grass (0–0) Carpet (0–0)	Finals by setting Outdoors (0–1) Indoors (0–0)

Result	W–L	Date	Tournament	Tier	Surface	Opponent	Score
Loss	0–1	Feb 1991	Guarujá, Brazil	World Series	Hard	(Germany) Patrick Baur	2–6, 3–6

=== Doubles: 3 (1 title, 2 runner-ups) ===
Legend Grand Slam Tournaments (0–0) ATP World Tour Finals (0–0) ATP World Tour Masters Series (0–0) ATP Championship Series (0–0) ATP World Series (1–2)	Finals by surface Hard (1–0) Clay (0–1) Grass (0–0) Carpet (0–1)	Finals by setting Outdoors (2–1) Indoors (0–1)

Result	W–L	Date	Tournament	Tier	Surface	Partner	Opponents	Score
Loss	0–1	Jul 1984	Båstad, Sweden	Grand Prix	Clay	(Spain) Juan Avendaño	(Sweden) Jan Gunnarsson (Denmark) Michael Mortensen	0–6, 0–6
Loss	0–2	Apr 1990	Rio de Janeiro, Brazil	World Series	Carpet	(Brazil) Nelson Aerts	(United States) Brian Garrow (United States) Sven Salumaa	5–7, 3–6
Win	1–2	Nov 1990	Itaparica, Brazil	World Series	Hard	(Brazil) Mauro Menezes	(Spain) Tomás Carbonell (Spain) Marcos Aurelio Gorriz	7–6, 7–5

== ATP Challenger and ITF Futures finals ==
=== Singles: 7 (2–5) ===
Legend ATP Challenger (2–5) ITF Futures (0–0)	Finals by surface Hard (1–1) Clay (1–3) Grass (0–0) Carpet (0–1)

Result	W–L	Date	Tournament	Tier	Surface	Opponent	Score
Loss	0–1	Aug 1989	Lins, Brazil	Challenger	Clay	(Brazil) Jaime Oncins	6–1, 0–6, 3–6
Loss	0–2	Aug 1989	Brasília, Brazil	Challenger	Carpet	(Brazil) Luiz Mattar	3–6, 2–6
Win	1–2	Apr 1991	Mexico City, Mexico	Challenger	Clay	(Mexico) Francisco Maciel	7–6, 4–6, 6–4
Win	2–2	May 1991	São Paulo, Brazil	Challenger	Hard	(Argentina) Gabriel Markus	6–4, 6–3
Loss	2–3	Jul 1991	Gramado, Brazil	Challenger	Hard	(France) Laurent Prades	5–7, 7–6, 4–6
Loss	2–4	Oct 1991	São Paulo, Brazil	Challenger	Clay	(Brazil) Jaime Oncins	4–6, 4–6
Loss	2–5	Nov 1991	São Paulo, Brazil	Challenger	Clay	(Brazil) Cassio Motta	4–6, 3–6

=== Doubles: 13 (5–8) ===
Legend ATP Challenger (5–8) ITF Futures (0–0)	Finals by surface Hard (3–6) Clay (2–1) Grass (0–0) Carpet (0–1)

Result	W–L	Date	Tournament	Tier	Surface	Partner	Opponents	Score
Win	1–0	Jul 1989	Campos do Jordao, Brazil	Challenger	Hard	(Brazil) Nelson Aerts	(Mexico) Stefan Dallwitz (Argentina) Daniel Orsanic	6–3, 7–6
Win	2–0	Aug 1989	São Paulo, Brazil	Challenger	Clay	(Brazil) Nelson Aerts	(Brazil) Dacio Campos (United States) Mario Tabares	2–6, 6–4, 6–4
Win	3–0	Apr 1990	Brasília, Brazil	Challenger	Hard	(Brazil) Nelson Aerts	(Italy) Simone Colombo (Brazil) Cesar Kist	6–3, 7–5
Loss	3–1	Jul 1990	Campos do Jordao, Brazil	Challenger	Hard	(Brazil) Nelson Aerts	(Brazil) Jaime Oncins (Brazil) Jose Daher	6–7, 4–6
Loss	3–2	Aug 1990	Brasília, Brazil	Challenger	Carpet	(Brazil) Luiz Mattar	(Brazil) Jaime Oncins (Canada) Andrew Sznajder	5–7, 6–3, 6–7
Loss	3–3	Feb 1991	Americana, Brazil	Challenger	Hard	(Brazil) Jose Daher	(Brazil) Alexandre Hocevar (Brazil) Marcos Hocevar	6–7, 4–6
Loss	3–4	May 1991	São Paulo, Brazil	Challenger	Hard	(Brazil) Nelson Aerts	(Brazil) Ricardo Acioly (Brazil) Mauro Menezes	3–6, 6–3, 3–6
Win	4–4	Jul 1991	Gramado, Brazil	Challenger	Hard	(Brazil) Nelson Aerts	(Haiti) Bertrand Madsen (Mexico) Gerardo Martinez	6–4, 6–4
Loss	4–5	Jul 1991	Aptos, United States	Challenger	Hard	(Puerto Rico) Miguel Nido	(Nigeria) Nduka Odizor (United States) Bryan Shelton	4–6, 3–6
Win	5–5	Nov 1991	São Paulo, Brazil	Challenger	Clay	(Portugal) Joao Cunha-Silva	(Argentina) Pablo Albano (Argentina) Luis Lobo	7–5, 4–6, 6–3
Loss	5–6	Jul 1992	Gramado, Brazil	Challenger	Hard	(Brazil) Nelson Aerts	(United States) Richard Matuszewski (United States) John Sullivan	6–7, 7–6, 3–6
Loss	5–7	Aug 1992	Lins, Brazil	Challenger	Clay	(Brazil) Cassio Motta	(Portugal) Joao Cunha-Silva (Venezuela) Nicolás Pereira	3–6, 4–6
Loss	5–8	Jul 1993	Belo Horizonte, Brazil	Challenger	Hard	(Chile) Felipe Rivera	(Brazil) Ricardo Acioly (Venezuela) Nicolás Pereira	6–7, 7–5, 3–6
