= Marcelo Hennemann =

Brazilian tennis player

- Country (sports): Brazil
- Residence: São Leopoldo
- Born: 11 March 1962 (age 63); Novo Hamburgo, Brazil
- Height: 1.70 m (5 ft 7 in)
- Turned pro: 1983
- Plays: Right-handed
- Prize money: $62,670

Singles
- Career record: 6–10
- Career titles: 0
- Highest ranking: No. 149 (21 Oct 1985)

Grand Slam singles results
- French Open: 2R (1988)

Doubles
- Career record: 4–11
- Career titles: 0
- Highest ranking: No. 200 (24 Apr 1989)

Marcelo Hennemann (born 11 March 1962) is a former professional tennis player from Brazil.

== Career ==
Hennemann qualified for his only Grand Slam tournament at the 1988 French Open, where he beat fellow qualifier Stéphane Grenier in the first round. He was beaten in the second round by Thomas Muster.

He was more successful on the doubles circuit than as a singles player, winning two Challenger doubles titles.

The Novo Hamburgo born player was a doubles semi-finalist with Ivan Kley at the 1987 Athens Open and a doubles quarter-finalist partnering José Clavet at Palermo in 1988.

== Challenger titles ==
=== Doubles: (2) ===
No.	Year	Tournament	Surface	Partner	Opponents	Score
1.	1988	Salou, Spain	Clay	(France) Jean-Marc Piacentile	(United States) Scott Patridge (United States) Otis Smith	6–4, 6–1
2.	1989	São Paulo, Brazil	Clay	(Brazil) Edvaldo Oliveira	(Brazil) Nelson Aerts (Brazil) Alexandre Hocevar	6–3, 6–3
