= José Daher =

Brazilian tennis player

- Full name: José Amin Daher Neto
- Country (sports): Brazil
- Born: 20 April 1966; São Paulo, Brazil
- Died: 13 January 2014 (aged 47) near Paraty, Brazil
- Plays: Right-handed
- Prize money: $124,483

Singles
- Career record: 4–12
- Career titles: 0
- Highest ranking: No. 139 (18 July 1988)

Doubles
- Career record: 7–13
- Career titles: 0
- Highest ranking: No. 188 (16 May 1988)

Grand Slam doubles results
- Wimbledon: 2R (1989)

José Amin Daher Neto (20 April 1966 – 13 January 2014), known as José Daher, was a professional tennis player from Brazil.

== Biography ==
Daher was born in São Paulo on 20 April 1966 and grew up in Barretos, a city in the north of the state.

=== Career ===
Daher, a right-hander, played his first professional tournament in 1983. During the 1980s he was a member of Brazil's Davis Cup squad on multiple occasions, however he didn't ever appear in a fixture.

When Andre Agassi won his first career title at Itaparica in 1987, Daher was the only one of his opponents to win a set against him. He featured in the main draw at 12 Grand Prix/ATP Tour tournaments in total, most of them in his native country, from which he made the second round four times, with his victories coming against Alberto Tous, Vicente Solves, William Kyriakos and Gabriel Markus. In 1988 he reached his highest ranking, 139th in the world.

He qualified for the main draw of the men's doubles at the 1989 Wimbledon Championships, with Fernando Roese. The pair had a straight sets win over Eddie Edwards and Greg Holmes in the first round, then lost in the second round to the fourth seeds Jim Grabb and Patrick McEnroe, but did manage to take a set off the American pairing.

At Challenger level he won three doubles titles and had a win over Guillermo Vilas at a São Paulo Challenger in 1991.

He founded the "Daher Tennis Lounge", a tennis centre in São José dos Campos.

=== Death ===
Daher died in a road accident on the Rio-Santos highway at the age of 47. On the morning of 13 January 2014 he was travelling near Paraty when his car swerved into a lane of incoming traffic and crashed into a tour bus. He was returning home from a weekend in Angra dos Reis.

== Challenger titles ==
=== Doubles: (3) ===
No.	Year	Tournament	Surface	Partner	Opponents	Score
1.	1987	São Paulo, Brazil	Clay	(Brazil) Eleutério Martins	(Brazil) Ricardo Acioly (Brazil) Dácio Campos	6–3, 7–6
2.	1990	Campos, Brazil	Hard	(Brazil) Jaime Oncins	(Brazil) Nelson Aerts (Brazil) Fernando Roese	7–6, 6–4
3.	1992	Campos, Brazil	Hard	(Cuba) Mario Tabares	(United States) Tom Mercer (United States) Donald Johnson	6–3, 6–7, 6–3
