= Roberto Argüello =

Argentine tennis player

- Country (sports): Argentina
- Residence: Buenos Aires
- Born: 12 May 1963 (age 62) Rosario, Argentina
- Height: 1.73 m (5 ft 8 in)
- Plays: Ambidextrous
- Prize money: $241,299

Singles
- Career record: 61–84
- Career titles: 1
- Highest ranking: No. 38 (16 Apr 1984)

Grand Slam singles results
- French Open: 2R (1985)
- US Open: 1R (1984, 1985)

Doubles
- Career record: 10–26
- Career titles: 0
- Highest ranking: No. 109 (26 Nov 1984)

Roberto Argüello (born 12 May 1963) is a former professional tennis player from Argentina.

== Career ==
Argüello was an ambidextrous player, capable of using right-handed shots for balls to his right and left-handed stokes for balls to the left of him. He however favoured a two-handed forehand and backhand.

The Argentine was the 1977 Junior Orange Bowl champion and four years later won the Under-18s Orange Bowl.

In 1982, the year of the Falklands War, he left tennis in order to serve with the Argentine Army. He played just one tournament that season, the Buenos Aires Open in February.

Argüello returned to the Grand Prix tennis circuit in 1983 and made an immediate impression, winning the Venice Open, as a qualifier. The 20-year-old defeated top seed Eliot Teltscher in the opening round and secured the tournament with a win over Jimmy Brown in the final. This made him just the fourth qualifier to ever win a Grand Prix title.

Also in 1983, Argüello upset world number seven José Luis Clerc to make the quarter-finals in Indianapolis and made another quarter-final appearances at Bordeaux.

Argüello attained his career best ranking, 38th in the world, in 1984, after making the semi-finals at Nice. He was also a semi-finalist in Palermo.

In 1985 he had his most consistent year on tour, reaching the quarter-finals of five tournaments, Buenos Aires, Nice, Bari, Palermo and Geneva. Another notables performances that season included beating world number six Anders Järryd in Hamburg and defeating Yannick Noah in Barcelona, when the Frenchman was also sixth in the world.

Argüello was a semi-finalist at Buenos Aires in 1986, the last time he would make it that far in a tournament. He did however make three further quarter-final appearances, at both Guarujá and Buenos Aires in 1988 and St Vincent in 1989.

While Argüello had success on the Grand Prix circuit, he struggled to make an impact in Grand Slam tournaments. He entered the main draw of six Grand Slams but only once made it past the first round, at the 1985 French Open, when he defeated Marty Davis in straight sets. The Argentine was then eliminated in the second round by Tomáš Šmíd.

His Davis Cup record for Argentina stands at 1-1. He had a win over Italian Francesco Cancellotti in 1983, to give Argentina a 5-0 clean-sweep of their World Group Quarter-final but lost to Raúl Viver of Ecuador in 1985. Both matches were dead rubbers.

== Grand Prix career finals ==
=== Singles: 1 (1–0) ===
Result	W-L	Date	Tournament	Surface	Opponent	Score
Win	1–0	1983	Venice, Italy	Clay	(United States) Jimmy Brown	2–6, 6–2, 6–0

== Challenger titles ==
=== Singles: (1) ===
No.	Year	Tournament	Surface	Opponent	Score
1.	1990	Geneva, Switzerland	Clay	(Argentina) Daniel Orsanic	6–3, 6–0
