= Ricardo Acioly =

Brazilian tennis player

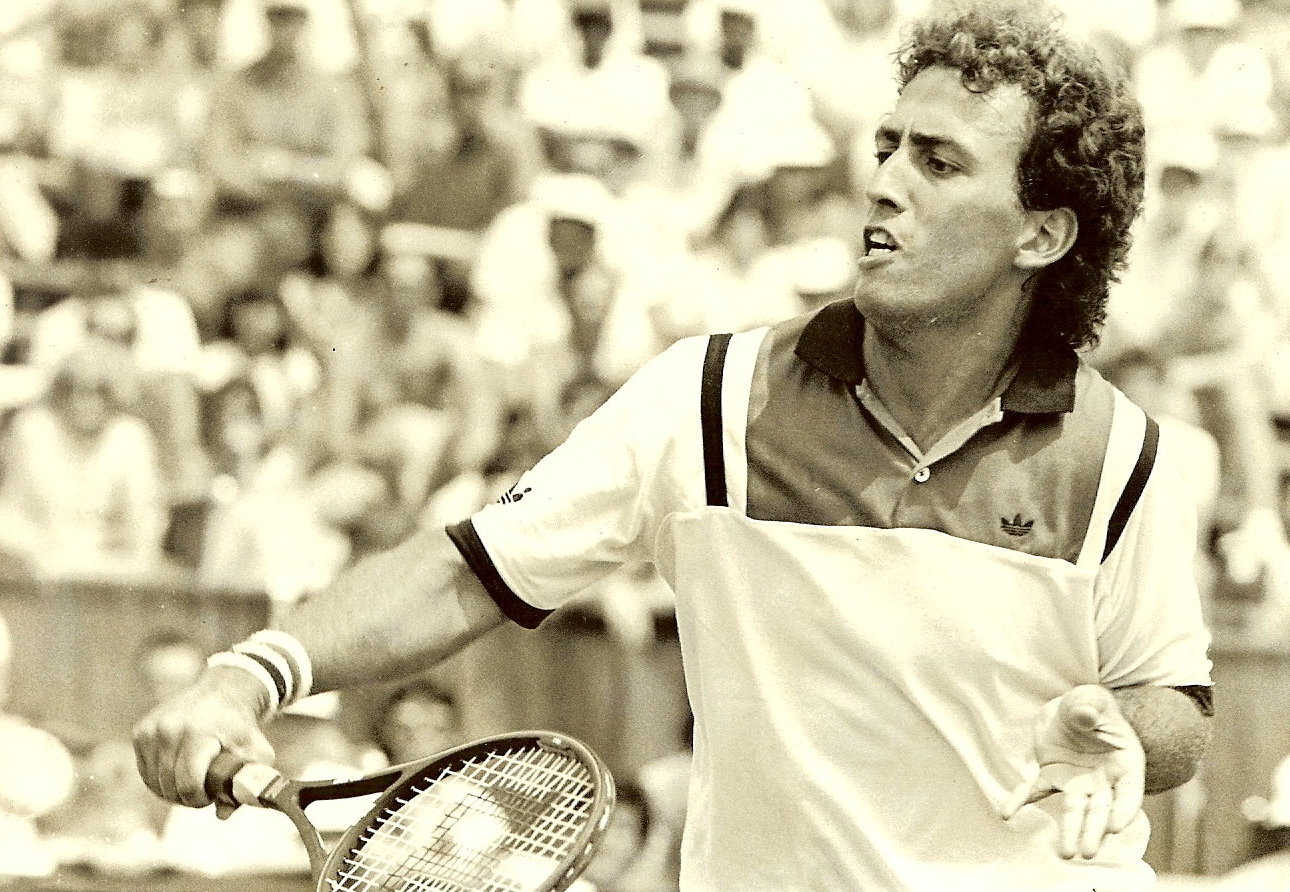
- Ricardo Acioly (1986)
- Full name: Ricardo Augusto Amaral Acioly
- Country (sports): Brazil
- Born: 4 February 1964 (age 62) Botafogo, Rio de Janeiro, Brazil
- Height: 1.78 m (5 ft 10 in)
- Turned pro: 1986
- Plays: Right-handed (one-handed backhand)
- Prize money: $151,966

Singles
- Career record: 3–6
- Career titles: 0
- Highest ranking: No. 228 (29 December 1986)

Grand Slam singles results
- Australian Open: Q1 (1992)
- US Open: 1R (1986)

Doubles
- Career record: 52–74
- Career titles: 3
- Highest ranking: No. 46 (27 October 1986)

Grand Slam doubles results
- Australian Open: 1R (1992)
- French Open: 1R (1989, 1992)
- Wimbledon: 1R (1987, 1989, 1992)
- US Open: 2R (1987)

Grand Slam mixed doubles results
- French Open: 1R (1989)
- Last updated on: 11 May 2022.

Ricardo Augusto Amaral Acioly (born 4 February 1964) is a former tennis player from Brazil. He has what is considered by many one of the most complete and successful careers in Brazilian tennis, having been recognized Internationally as a player, coach, executive, tournament promoter, and sports commentator.

He comes from a "tennis family". His father, Claudio, who died in 2012, played tennis until he was 82 years old. His mother, Teresinha, still plays daily, competes in official tournaments, and has reached the N1 position in the Ladies 85 and over ITF Seniors world ranking.

== As a player ==
As a junior, Acioly was always one of the best Brazilian players of his age group, winning many national titles and was a finalist at the Orange Bowl, considered at the time the World Junior Championships. He then went on to play Division 1 college tennis and was team captain and the No. 1 player for the University of South Carolina, a top 20 team on the NCAA's Division 1 rankings.

After graduating with a Business Degree from South Carolina in 1985, Acioly went on to play the ATP Pro Tour for eight years and became a member of the Brazilian Davis Cup Team (87'/'88/'89) and the Brazilian Olympic Team (Seoul '88).

He was ranked No. 46 in the world ATP doubles rankings. A six-times finalist in tournaments at the highest level of the ATP Tour, he won titles in Vienna, Geneva, and Guarujá. He was a finalist in Washington, Brasília, and Maceio. He also played and represented Brazil in the 1988 Summer Olympics in Seoul, South Korea.

== ATP career finals ==
=== Doubles: 6 (3 titles, 3 runners-up) ===
Legend Grand Slam Tournaments (0–0) ATP World Tour Finals (0–0) ATP Masters Series (0–0) ATP Championship Series (0–0) ATP World Series (3–3)	Finals by surface Hard (2–1) Clay (1–2) Grass (0–0) Carpet (0–0)	Finals by setting Outdoors (2–3) Indoors (1–0)

Result	W–L	Date	Tournament	Tier	Surface	Partner	Opponents	Score
Loss	0–1	Aug 1986	Washington, United States	Grand Prix	Clay	(Brazil) César Kist	(Chile) Hans Gildemeister (Ecuador) Andrés Gómez	3–6, 5–7
Win	1–1	Oct 1986	Vienna, Austria	Grand Prix	Hard	(Poland) Wojciech Fibak	(United States) Brad Gilbert (Socialist Federal Republic of Yugoslavia) Slobodan Živojinović	walkover
Win	2–1	Sep 1987	Geneva, Switzerland	Grand Prix	Clay	(Brazil) Luiz Mattar	(Iran) Mansour Bahrami (Uruguay) Diego Pérez	3–6, 6–4, 6–2
Win	3–1	Feb 1989	Guarujá, Brazil	Grand Prix	Hard	(Brazil) Dácio Campos	(Brazil) César Kist (Brazil) Mauro Menezes	7–6, 7–6
Loss	3–2	Sep 1991	Brasília, Brazil	World Series	Clay	(Brazil) Mauro Menezes	(United States) Kent Kinnear (The Bahamas) Roger Smith	4–6, 3–6
Loss	3–3	Feb 1992	Maceió, Brazil	World Series	Hard	(Brazil) Mauro Menezes	(Argentina) Gabriel Markus (United States) John Sobel	4–6, 6–1, 5–7

== ATP Challenger and ITF Futures finals ==
=== Doubles: 9 (7–2) ===
Legend ATP Challenger (7–2) ITF Futures (0–0)	Finals by surface Hard (4–1) Clay (3–0) Grass (0–0) Carpet (0–1)

Result	W–L	Date	Tournament	Tier	Surface	Partner	Opponents	Score
Win	1-0	Apr 1989	Brasília, Brazil	Challenger	Hard	(Brazil) Dácio Campos	(Brazil) Marcelo Hennemann (Brazil) Edvaldo Oliveira	7–6, 6–3
Loss	1-1	Aug 1990	Brasília, Brazil	Challenger	Carpet	(Brazil) Nelson Aerts	(Brazil) Luiz Mattar (Brazil) Fernando Roese	6–4, 3–6, 6–7
Loss	1-2	Oct 1990	Manaus, Brazil	Challenger	Hard	(Brazil) Mauro Menezes	(United States) Shelby Cannon (Venezuela) Alfonso Gonzalez-Mora	6–7, 4–6
Win	2-2	Apr 1991	Mexico City, Mexico	Challenger	Clay	(Argentina) Pablo Albano	(United States) Francisco Montana (United States) Leif Shiras	6–3, 6–3
Win	3-2	May 1991	São Paulo, Brazil	Challenger	Hard	(Brazil) Mauro Menezes	(Brazil) Nelson Aerts (Brazil) Fernando Roese	6–3, 3–6, 6–3
Win	4-2	May 1991	Ribeirão Preto, Brazil	Challenger	Clay	(Brazil) Mauro Menezes	(United States) Steve Bryan (United States) T. J. Middleton	6–3, 6–4
Win	5-2	Jun 1991	Itu, Brazil	Challenger	Hard	(Brazil) Mauro Menezes	(Brazil) Jose Daher (Japan) Eduardo Furusho	7–6, 6–3
Win	6-2	Aug 1991	Lins, Brazil	Challenger	Clay	(Brazil) Mauro Menezes	(Japan) Eduardo Furusho (Brazil) João Zwetsch	2–6, 7–5, 7–5
Win	7-2	Jul 1993	Belo Horizonte, Brazil	Challenger	Hard	(Venezuela) Nicolás Pereira	(Chile) Felipe Rivera (Brazil) Fernando Roese	7–6, 5–7, 6–3

== Performance timeline ==
Key
W	F	SF	QF	#R	RR	Q#	DNQ	A	NH

(W) winner; (F) finalist; (SF) semifinalist; (QF) quarterfinalist; (#R) rounds 4, 3, 2, 1; (RR) round-robin stage; (Q#) qualification round; (DNQ) did not qualify; (A) absent; (NH) not held; (SR) strike rate (events won / competed); (W–L) win–loss record.

=== Doubles ===
Tournament	1986	1987	1988	1989	1990	1991	1992	SR	W–L	Win %
Grand Slam tournaments
Australian Open	A	A	A	A	A	A	1R	0 / 1	0–1	0%
French Open	A	A	A	1R	A	A	1R	0 / 2	0–2	0%
Wimbledon	A	1R	A	1R	Q3	A	1R	0 / 3	0–3	0%
US Open	1R	2R	1R	1R	A	1R	1R	0 / 6	1–6	14%
Win–loss	0–1	1–2	0–1	0–3	0–0	0–1	0–4	0 / 12	1–12	8%
Olympic Games
Summer Olympics	NH		2R	Not Held			A	0 / 1	1–1	50%
ATP Masters Series
Miami	A	A	2R	A	A	A	1R	0 / 2	1–2	33%
Rome	A	A	A	1R	A	A	A	0 / 1	0–1	0%
Cincinnati	A	A	2R	A	A	A	A	0 / 1	1–1	50%
Paris	QF	A	A	A	A	A	A	0 / 1	1–1	50%
Win–loss	1–1	0–0	2–2	0–1	0–0	0–0	0–1	0 / 5	3–5	38%

== As a coach ==
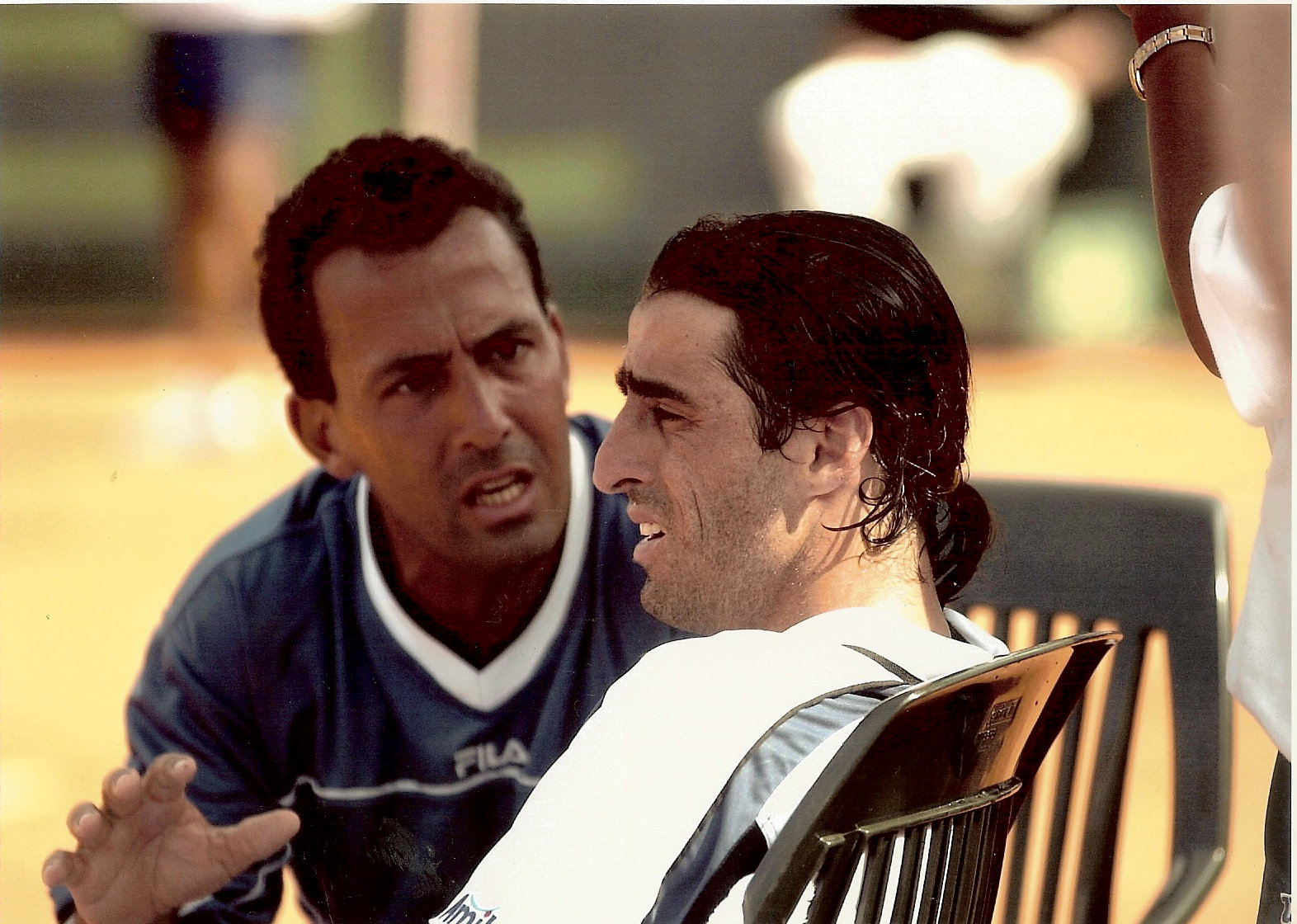
Davis Cup Coaching

As a full-time ATP travelling coach Acioly worked with several top players in the world like former ATP No. 1 Marcelo Ríos, WTA's N0. 2 Gabriela Sabatini, Fernando Meligeni (ATP 24), who he coached for 7 years and quite a few other players in the ATP Top 100 like Nicolás Pereira, Andre Sá, Javier Frana, Hernán Gumy and Alexandre Simoni. The results of the work with his players are significant having achieved a semifinal in the French Open, a semifinal and a quarterfinal in the Australian Open, a 4th place showing in the Atlanta Olympic Games and more than 10 titles on ATP Tour level tournaments in Singles and Doubles.

He was also Davis Cup captain for Brazil for six years and during his tenure as captain Brazil reached 1 semifinal and 2 quarter finals in the World Group. The list of team members coached during this period included world No. 1 Gustavo Kuerten, Fernando Meligeni, Jaime Oncins, Andre Sá, Flávio Saretta, Alexandre Simoni, Ricardo Mello and Márcio Carlsson. Up until today Brazil's biggest win in Davis Cup came under his leadership when in 1999 they defeated Spain in Lerida, Spain, against a team that had at the time four Top 10 players: Carlos Moyá, Àlex Corretja, Albert Costa and Félix Mantilla.

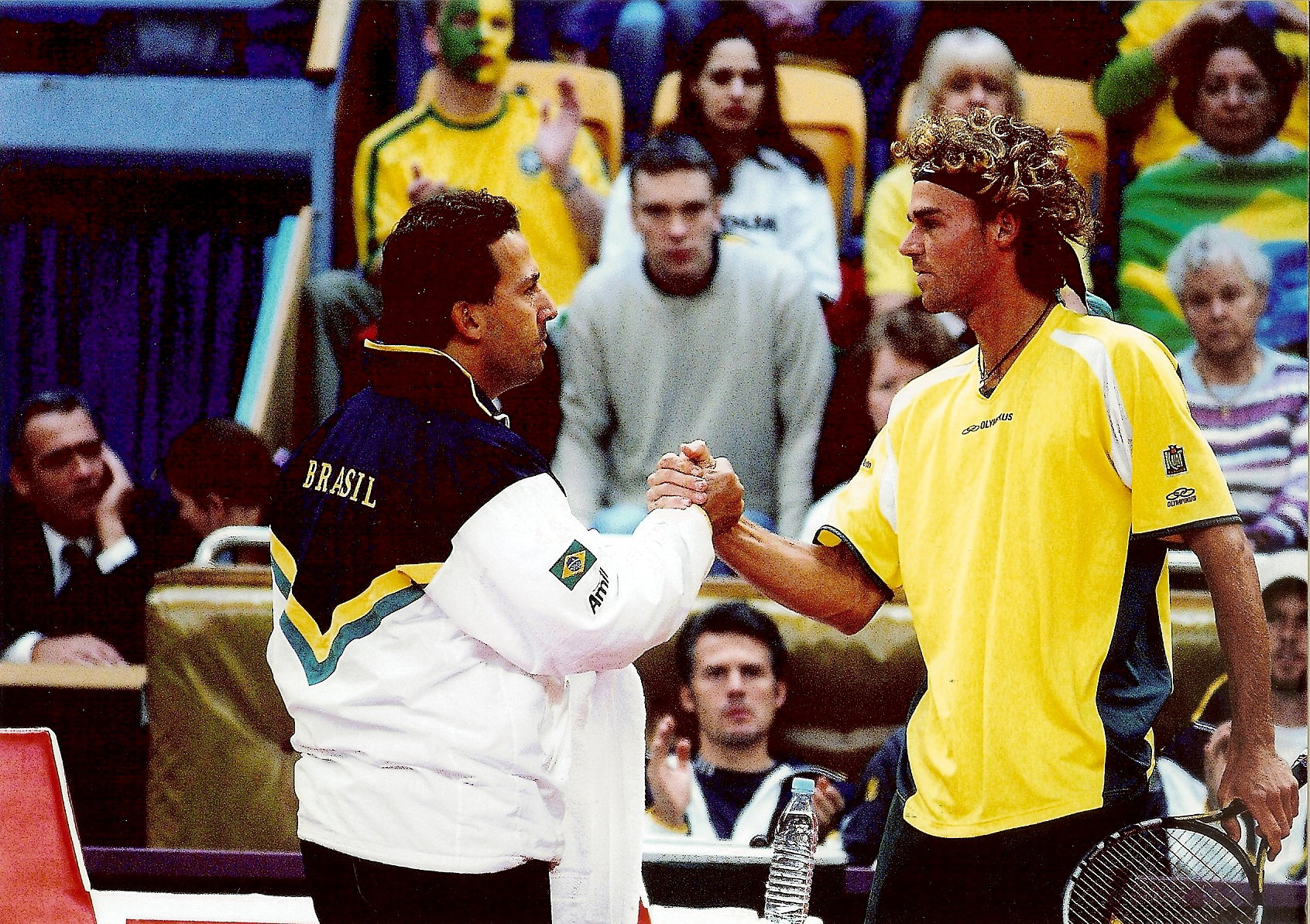
Ricardo Acioly coaching Gustavo "Guga" Kuerten during his Davis Cup match

Acioly also worked and developed a number of top juniors that went on to have a successful careers on the ATP Tour like Marcelo Melo (world No. 1 in Doubles), João Souza (ATP No. 69), Franco Ferreiro (ATP top 50), Colombian Alejandro González (ATP No. 70) and quite a few others that had significant results in the ATP and ITF junior circuits.

== Off court ==
As a tennis executive Acioly is the only South American in history to have served as a director on the ATP Board of Directors. He is also a two time member of the ATP Player Council which has had players like Roger Federer, Rafael Nadal and Novak Djokovic as members. He has organized and promoted a number of professional events on the ATP's Challenger Tour, Champions Tour and currently serves as Director of Relations on the organizing committee of the Rio Open ATP 500, the biggest professional tennis tournament in South America.

Acioly is a tennis commentator for Globo Brazilian TV, SPORTV Channel and does the play by play for matches during the US Open Tennis, Wimbledon Championships, Davis Cup and all ATP Masters 1000 tournaments.
