= Luiz Mattar =

Brazilian tennis player (born 1963)

- Country (sports): Brazil
- Residence: São Paulo, Brazil
- Born: August 18, 1963 (age 62) São Paulo, Brazil
- Height: 1.83 m (6 ft 0 in)
- Turned pro: 1985
- Retired: 1995
- Plays: Right-handed (one-handed backhand)
- Prize money: $1,484,394

Singles
- Career record: 191–178
- Career titles: 7; 5 Challenger, 0 Futures
- Highest ranking: No. 29 (1 May 1989)

Grand Slam singles results
- Australian Open: 2R (1991, 1993)
- French Open: 3R (1986)
- Wimbledon: 2R (1991)
- US Open: 3R (1990, 1991)

Other tournaments
- Olympic Games: 1R (1988, 1992)

Doubles
- Career record: 104–111
- Career titles: 5; 3 Challenger, 0 Futures
- Highest ranking: No. 55 (7 January 1991)

Grand Slam doubles results
- Australian Open: 1R (1993)
- French Open: 3R (1986, 1990, 1993)
- Wimbledon: 1R (1987, 1990, 1991)
- US Open: 2R (1986, 1990, 1991)

Other doubles tournaments
- Olympic Games: 2R (1988)

Grand Slam mixed doubles results
- French Open: 2R (1990)

Team competitions
- Davis Cup: SF (1992)
- Last updated on: 25 December 2023.

Luiz Mattar (born August 18, 1963) is a former professional tennis player from Brazil.

He played on the professional tour from 1985 to 1995, during which time he won seven top-level singles titles and five tour doubles titles. Mattar's career-high rankings were World No. 29 in singles (in 1989) and World No. 55 in doubles (in 1991). His career prize money totalled $1,493,136.

With seven ATP singles titles in tournaments of the Association of Professional Tennis Players, he is the second Brazilian tennis player, after Gustavo Kuerten, with more ATP titles in his career. He also led the Brazilian Davis Cup team to their best result in history back in 1992 defeating Germany and Italy and reaching the semi-final of the World Group in the 1992 Davis Cup. This feat has only been matched by Gustavo Kuerten who led the Brazilian team again to the semi-final in 2000.

He started his professional career only at the age of 22, unlike most tennis players who started their careers at 18 or earlier, after dropping out in his last year of engineering at Mackenzie Presbyterian University in São Paulo.

He was trained by Paulo Cleto from the beginning to the end of his career. He even said that he couldn't see himself training with another coach. He is considered by several sports analysts, tennis critics and former tennis players as one of the ten greatest Brazilian tennis players of the Open Era.

Mattar is the son of textile businessman Fuad Mattar and is of Lebanese descent. After retiring from tennis he became an entrepreneur and is the founder of TIVIT, one of Brazil's largest information technology service providers.

== ATP career finals ==
=== Singles: 11 (7 wins, 4 runner-ups) ===
Legend Grand Slam Tournaments (0–0) ATP World Tour Finals (0–0) ATP World Tour Masters Series (0–0) ATP Championship Series (0–0) ATP World Series (7–4)	Finals by surface Hard (2–4) Clay (3–0) Grass (0–0) Carpet (2–0)	Finals by setting Outdoors (5–4) Indoors (2–0)

Result	W–L	Date	Tournament	Tier	Surface	Opponent	Score
Win	1–0	Jan 1987	Guarujá, Brazil	Grand Prix	Hard	(Brazil) Cássio Motta	6–3, 5–7, 6–2
Loss	1–1	Nov 1987	São Paulo, Brazil	Grand Prix	Hard	(Peru) Jaime Yzaga	2–6, 6–4, 2–6
Loss	1–2	Nov 1987	Itaparica, Brazil	Grand Prix	Hard	(United States) Andre Agassi	6–7, 2–6
Win	2–2	Jan 1988	Guarujá, Brazil	Grand Prix	Clay	(United States) Eliot Teltscher	6–3, 6–3
Win	3–2	Feb 1989	Guarujá, Brazil	Grand Prix	Clay	(United States) Jimmy Brown	7–6, 6–4
Win	4–2	Apr 1989	Rio de Janeiro, Brazil	Grand Prix	Carpet	(Argentina) Martín Jaite	6–4, 5–7, 6–4
Loss	4–3	Feb 1990	Guarujá, Brazil	World Series	Hard	(Argentina) Martín Jaite	6–3, 4–6, 3–6
Win	5–3	Apr 1990	Rio de Janeiro, Brazil	World Series	Carpet	(Canada) Andrew Sznajder	6–4, 6–4
Win	6–3	Nov 1992	São Paulo, Brazil	World Series	Hard	(Brazil) Jaime Oncins	6–1, 6–4
Loss	6–4	Feb 1994	Scottsdale, USA	World Series	Hard	(United States) Andre Agassi	4–6, 3–6
Win	7–4	May 1994	Coral Springs, USA	World Series	Clay	(Australia) Jamie Morgan	6–4, 3–6, 6–3

=== Doubles (5 wins, 6 losses) ===
Legend Grand Slam (0) Tennis Masters Cup (0) ATP Masters Series (0) ATP Tour (4)	Titles by surface Hard (2) Grass (0) Clay (3) Carpet (0)

Result	W/L	Date	Tournament	Surface	Partner	Opponents	Score
Win	1–0	Jan 1987	Guarujá, Brazil	Hard	(Brazil) Cássio Motta	(Germany) Martin Hipp (Germany) Tore Meinecke	7–6, 6–1
Win	2–0	Sep 1987	Geneva, Switzerland	Clay	(Brazil) Ricardo Acioly	(Iran) Mansour Bahrami (Uruguay) Diego Pérez	3–6, 6–4, 6–2
Loss	2–1	Feb 1990	Guarujá, Brazil	Hard	(Brazil) Cássio Motta	(Argentina) Javier Frana (Argentina) Gustavo Luza	6–7, 6–7
Loss	2–2	Jun 1990	Florence, Italy	Clay	(Uruguay) Diego Pérez	(Spain) Sergi Bruguera (Argentina) Horacio de la Peña	6–3, 3–6, 4–6
Loss	2–3	Oct 1990	São Paulo, Brazil	Carpet	(Netherlands) Mark Koevermans	(United States) Shelby Cannon (Venezuela) Alfonso Mora	7–6, 3–6, 6–7
Win	3–3	Dec 1990	Wellington, New Zealand	Hard	(Venezuela) Nicolás Pereira	(United States) John Letts (Brazil) Jaime Oncins	4–6, 7–6, 6–2
Loss	3–4	Apr 1991	Madrid, Spain	Clay	(Brazil) Jaime Oncins	(Argentina) Gustavo Luza (Brazil) Cássio Motta	0–6, 5–7
Loss	3–5	May 1991	Bologna, Italy	Clay	(Brazil) Jaime Oncins	(United States) Luke Jensen (Australia) Laurie Warder	4–6, 6–7
Loss	3–6	Apr 1992	Tampa, USA	Clay	(Russia) Andrei Olhovskiy	(United States) Mike Briggs (United States) Trevor Kronemann	6–7, 7–6, 4–6
Win	4–6	Jun 1992	Florence, Italy	Clay	(Uruguay) Marcelo Filippini	(South Africa) Royce Deppe (South Africa) Brent Haygarth	6–4, 6–7, 6–4
Win	5–6	Oct 1994	Montevideo, Uruguay	Clay	(Uruguay) Marcelo Filippini	(Spain) Sergio Casal (Spain) Emilio Sánchez	7–6, 6–4

== ATP Challenger and ITF Futures finals ==
=== Singles: 9 (5–4) ===
Legend ATP Challenger (5–4) ITF Futures (0–0)	Finals by surface Hard (4–0) Clay (1–3) Grass (0–0) Carpet (0–1)

Result	W–L	Date	Tournament	Tier	Surface	Opponent	Score
Loss	0–1	Aug 1989	São Paulo, Brazil	Challenger	Clay	(Chile) Pedro Rebolledo	3–6, 2–6
Loss	0–2	Aug 1989	Brasília, Brazil	Challenger	Carpet	(United States) Mario Tabares	3–6, 2–6
Win	1–2	Nov 1989	Rio de Janeiro, Brazil	Challenger	Hard	(Spain) Francisco Roig	6–4, 6–3
Win	2–2	Nov 1990	Rio de Janeiro, Brazil	Challenger	Clay	(Mexico) Luis-Enrique Herrera	6–3, 3–6, 6–3
Win	3–2	Mar 1992	Zaragoza, Spain	Challenger	Hard	(Spain) Tomas Carbonell	7–5, 3–6, 6–2
Loss	3–3	Apr 1992	Birmingham, United States	Challenger	Clay	(Sweden) Mikael Pernfors	6–7, 4–6
Win	4–3	Oct 1992	Recife, Brazil	Challenger	Hard	(Brazil) Jaime Oncins	7–6, 5–7, 7–5
Win	5–3	Nov 1992	São Luís, Brazil	Challenger	Hard	(Venezuela) Maurice Ruah	6–4, 6–4
Loss	5–4	Jul 1993	Campinas, Brazil	Challenger	Clay	(Brazil) Fernando Meligeni	4–6, 2–6

=== Doubles: 8 (3–5) ===
Legend ATP Challenger (3–5) ITF Futures (0–0)	Finals by surface Hard (0–0) Clay (2–1) Grass (0–0) Carpet (0–1)

Result	W–L	Date	Tournament	Tier	Surface	Partner	Opponents	Score
Loss	0–1	Nov 1989	Rio de Janeiro, Brazil	Challenger	Hard	(Brazil) Dacio Campos	(United States) Charles Beckman (United States) Shelby Cannon	3–6, 2–6
Win	1–1	Dec 1989	São Paulo, Brazil	Challenger	Clay	(Brazil) Cassio Motta	(Cuba) Juan-Antonio Pino-Perez (United States) Mario Tabares	7–5, 6–2
Loss	1–2	Aug 1990	Brasília, Brazil	Challenger	Carpet	(Brazil) Fernando Roese	(Brazil) Jaime Oncins (Canada) Andrew Sznajder	5–7, 6–3, 6–7
Win	2–2	Oct 1991	São Paulo, Brazil	Challenger	Clay	(Brazil) Jaime Oncins	(Argentina) Juan-Ignacio Garat (United States) Marcelo Saliola	6–4, 6–4
Loss	2–3	Oct 1992	Recife, Brazil	Challenger	Hard	(Brazil) Jaime Oncins	(Canada) Sebastien Lareau (Canada) Daniel Nestor	7–5, 4–6, 6–7
Win	3–3	Nov 1992	São Luís, Brazil	Challenger	Hard	(Brazil) Jaime Oncins	(Venezuela) Maurice Ruah (United States) Mario Tabares	6–3, 7–5
Loss	3–4	Sep 1993	Natal, Brazil	Challenger	Clay	(Brazil) Jaime Oncins	(Netherlands) Stephen Noteboom (United States) Jack Waite	6–4, 0–6, 3–6
Loss	3–5	Nov 1993	São Luís, Brazil	Challenger	Hard	(Brazil) Jaime Oncins	(Brazil) Otavio Della (Brazil) Marcelo Saliola	7–6, 3–6, 6–7

== Performance timelines ==
Key
W	F	SF	QF	#R	RR	Q#	DNQ	A	NH

(W) winner; (F) finalist; (SF) semifinalist; (QF) quarterfinalist; (#R) rounds 4, 3, 2, 1; (RR) round-robin stage; (Q#) qualification round; (DNQ) did not qualify; (A) absent; (NH) not held; (SR) strike rate (events won / competed); (W–L) win–loss record.

=== Singles ===
Tournament	1985	1986	1987	1988	1989	1990	1991	1992	1993	1994	1995	SR	W–L	Win %
Grand Slam Tournaments
Australian Open	A	A	A	A	A	A	2R	A	2R	A	1R	0 / 3	2–3	40%
French Open	A	3R	2R	2R	2R	2R	1R	1R	1R	1R	A	0 / 9	6–9	40%
Wimbledon	Q3	A	1R	A	A	1R	2R	1R	A	A	A	0 / 4	1–4	20%
US Open	A	1R	A	1R	1R	3R	3R	1R	2R	A	A	0 / 7	5–7	42%
Win–loss	0–0	2–2	1–2	1–2	1–2	3–3	4–4	0–3	2–3	0–1	0–1	0 / 23	14–23	38%
National Representation
Olympic Games	Not Held			1R	Not Held			1R	Not Held			0 / 2	0–2	0%
ATP Tour Masters 1000
Indian Wells	A	A	A	1R	1R	A	2R	A	2R	A	A	0 / 4	2–4	33%
Miami	A	A	2R	2R	1R	A	1R	A	1R	1R	1R	0 / 7	2–7	22%
Monte Carlo	A	A	1R	1R	A	1R	1R	A	1R	A	A	0 / 5	0–5	0%
Hamburg	A	A	1R	A	A	3R	2R	A	1R	A	A	0 / 4	3–4	43%
Rome	A	A	2R	A	1R	2R	1R	A	2R	A	A	0 / 5	3–5	38%
Canada	A	A	A	A	A	A	A	A	1R	1R	A	0 / 2	0–2	0%
Cincinnati	A	A	A	A	A	A	A	A	2R	A	A	0 / 1	1–1	50%
Win–loss	0–0	0–0	2–4	1–3	0–3	3–3	2–5	0–0	3–7	0–2	0–1	0 / 28	11–28	28%

=== Doubles ===
Tournament	1985	1986	1987	1988	1989	1990	1991	1992	1993	1994	SR	W–L	Win %	
Grand Slam Tournaments
Australian Open	A	A	A	A	A	A	A	A	1R	A	0 / 1	0–1	0%	
French Open	A	3R	1R	1R	1R	3R	1R	1R	3R	A	0 / 8	6–8	43%	
Wimbledon	Q3	A	1R	A	A	1R	1R	A	A	A	0 / 3	0–3	0%	
US Open	A	2R	A	1R	1R	2R	2R	1R	A	A	0 / 6	3–6	33%	
Win–loss	0–0	3–2	0–2	0–2	0–2	3–3	1–3	0–2	2–2	0–0	0 / 18	9–18	33%	
National Representation
Olympic Games	Not Held			2R	Not Held			1R	NH		0 / 2	1–2	33%	
ATP Tour Masters 1000
Indian Wells	A	A	QF	A	A	A	1R	A	A	A	0 / 2	2–2	50%	
Miami	A	A	A	A	A	A	1R	A	1R	1R	0 / 3	0–3	0%	
Monte Carlo	A	A	2R	A	A	1R	1R	A	Q2	A	0 / 3	1–3	25%	
Hamburg	A	A	QF	A	A	2R	1R	A	QF	A	0 / 4	5–4	56%	
Rome	A	1R	1R	A	QF	2R	2R	A	2R	A	0 / 6	5–6	45%	
Canada	A	A	A	A	A	A	A	A	Q1	A	A	0 / 0	0–0	–
Cincinnati	A	A	A	A	A	A	A	A	Q2	A	0 / 0	0–0	–	
Win–loss	0–0	0–1	5–4	0–0	2–1	2–3	1–5	0–0	3–3	0–1	0 / 18	13–18	42%	
