= Dácio Campos =

Brazilian tennis player

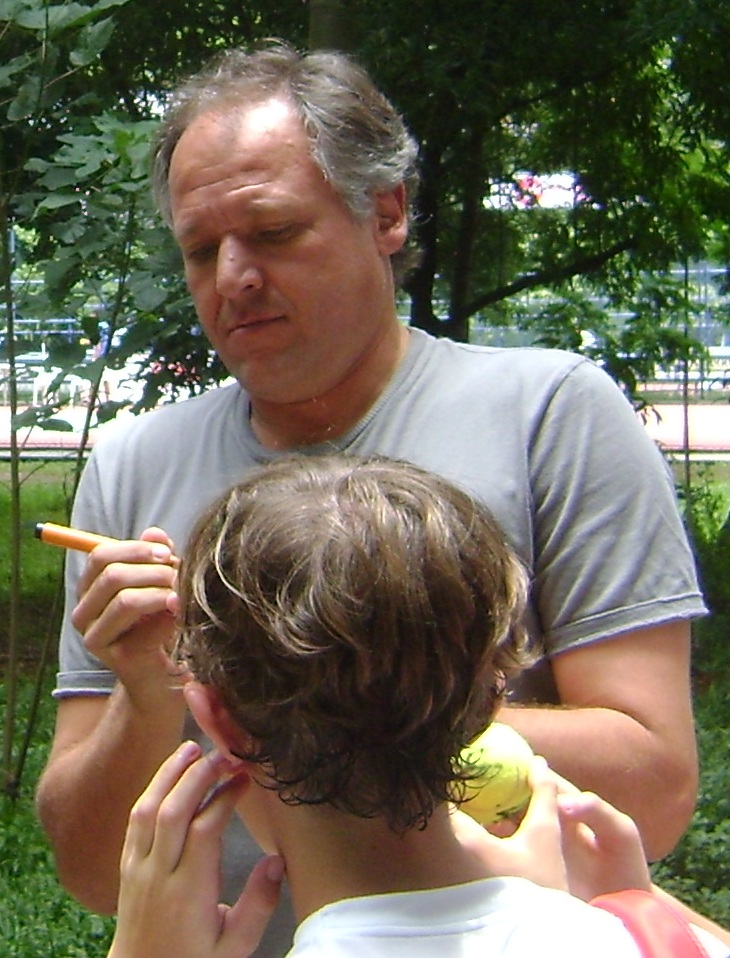
- Dácio Campos in 2011
- Country (sports): Brazil
- Born: 18 December 1963 (age 61); Piracicaba, Brazil
- Height: 6 ft 1 in (1.85 m)
- Plays: Right-handed
- Prize money: $101,721

Singles
- Career record: 1—12
- Career titles: 0
- Highest ranking: No. 107 (22 Jul 1985)

Grand Slam singles results
- French Open: 1R (1985)

Doubles
- Career record: 14–33
- Career titles: 1
- Highest ranking: No. 82 (15 May 1989)

Grand Slam doubles results
- French Open: 1R (1985, 86, 87, 89)
- Wimbledon: 2R (1986)
- US Open: 1R (1989)

Dácio Campos (born 18 December 1963) is a Brazilian former professional tennis player and TV commentator.

== Career ==
Campos played collegiate tennis in the United States, for the University of Houston.

In 1985, he appeared in three Davis Cup ties for Brazil, against Venezuela, Colombia and Mexico. He won four rubbers, three in singles and one in doubles.

At the 1985 French Open, Campos played eighth seed Eliot Teltscher in the first round and lost in straight sets. It would be his only Grand Slam singles match. He did however appear in the men's doubles at nine Grand Slam tournaments.

Campos was a mixed doubles quarter-finalist at the 1986 French Open, with Regina Maršíková as his partner.

He won one Grand Prix tournament during his career, which was as a doubles player, at the 1989 Guarujá Open.

== Grand Prix career finals ==
=== Doubles: 1 (1–0) ===
Result	W/L	Date	Tournament	Surface	Partner	Opponents	Score
Win	1–0	Feb 1989	Guaruja, Brazil	Hard	(Brazil) Ricardo Acioly	(Brazil) César Kist (Brazil) Mauro Menezes	7–6, 7–6

== Challenger titles ==
=== Singles: (1) ===
No.	Year	Tournament	Surface	TOpponent	Score
1.	1985	Campos dos Goytacazes, Brazil	Hard	(Brazil) Nelson Aerts	6–7, 6–3, 6–2

=== Doubles: (6) ===
No.	Year	Tournament	Surface	Partner	Opponents	Score
1.	1985	Curitiba, Brazil	Clay	(Brazil) Luiz Mattar	(Chile) Álvaro Fillol (Switzerland) Dominik Utzinger	7–6, 6–3
2.	1985	Tampere, Finland	Clay	(Italy) Alessandro de Minicis	(Brazil) Carlos Kirmayr (Brazil) Luiz Mattar	6–4, 1–6, 6–3
3.	1985	Campos dos Goytacazes, Brazil	Hard	(Brazil) Carlos Kirmayr	(Brazil) Luiz Mattar (Chile) Belus Prajoux	6–4, 3–6, 6–4
4.	1986	Campos dos Goytacazes, Brazil	Hard	(Brazil) Carlos Kirmayr	(Brazil) Givaldo Barbosa (Brazil) Ivan Kley	7–6, 7–5
5.	1988	São Paulo, Brazil	Clay	(Argentina) Pablo Albano	(Argentina) Gustavo Luza (Argentina) Alberto Mancini	7–5, 6–4
6.	1989	Brasília, Brazil	Hard	(Brazil) Ricardo Acioly	(Brazil) Marcelo Hennemann (Brazil) Edvaldo Oliveira	7–6, 6–3
