= Edvaldo Oliveira =

Brazilian tennis player (born 1963)

- Country (sports): Brazil
- Born: 18 November 1963 (age 61); Bauru, São Paulo, Brazil
- Height: 5 ft 10 in (178 cm)
- Plays: Right-handed
- Prize money: $22,065

Singles
- Career record: 0–5
- Highest ranking: No. 208 (6 October 1986)

Grand Slam singles results
- Wimbledon: Q1 (1983)

Doubles
- Career record: 3–17
- Highest ranking: No. 192 (16 September 1985)

Grand Slam doubles results
- Wimbledon: Q1 (1983)

Edvaldo Oliveira (born 18 November 1963) is a Brazilian former professional tennis player.

== Biography ==
A right-handed player from São Paulo, Oliveira represented Brazil in a 1982 Davis Cup tie against Ecuador in Fortaleza. He played the opening singles rubber and was beaten by Ricardo Ycaza.

Oliveira reached a best singles ranking of 208 in the world during his career. He featured in the qualifying draw for the 1983 Wimbledon Championships.

Together with former player Thiago Alves he now runs a tennis training centre.

== Challenger titles ==
=== Doubles: (1) ===
Year	Tournament	Surface	Partner	Opponents	Score
1989	São Paulo, Brazil	Clay	(Brazil) Marcelo Hennemann	(Brazil) Nelson Aerts (Brazil) Alexandre Hocevar	6–3, 6–3

== See also ==
- List of Brazil Davis Cup team representatives
