= Alexandre Hocevar =

Brazilian tennis player

- Full name: Alexandre Hocevar
- Country (sports): Brazil
- Born: 19 February 1963 (age 62); Ijuí, Brazil
- Plays: Right-handed
- Prize money: $90,542

Singles
- Career record: 5–9
- Career titles: 0
- Highest ranking: No. 169 (12 February 1990)

Doubles
- Career record: 11–29
- Career titles: 0
- Highest ranking: No. 118 (12 November 1984)

Grand Slam doubles results
- French Open: 1R (1984, 1985)^{Note}
- Wimbledon: 1R (1984)

Alexandre Hocevar (born 19 February 1963) is a former professional tennis player from Brazil.

== Biography ==
=== Career ===
Hocevar was born in Ijuí, Rio Grande do Sul, of Slovene descent. Began competing professionally in 1982.

Most successful as a doubles player, he appeared in the men's doubles draws of both the French Open and Wimbledon during his career, as well as making the semi-finals of Grand Prix tournaments at Itaparica and Guarujá in 1980s. He won a total of eight doubles titles at Challenger level, four of them with his brother Marcos.

As a singles player he made it as high as 169 in the world and was runner-up at the Dublin Challenger in 1987. His best performance on the ATP Tour (previously Grand Prix) came at the Guarujá Open in 1990, where he had wins over Otávio Della, Mario Tabares and Cássio Motta to reach the semi-finals.

=== Personal life ===
Elder brother Marcos Hocevar played Davis Cup tennis for Brazil. A nephew, Ricardo, who is the son of another brother Jorge, was also a professional tennis player.

His surname, Hocevar, is Slovenian.

== Challenger titles ==
=== Doubles: (8) ===
| No. | Year | Tournament | Surface | Partner | Opponents | Score |
|---|---|---|---|---|---|---|
| 1. | 1984 | Guarujá, Brazil | Clay | (Brazil) Marcos Hocevar | (Chile) Álvaro Fillol (Chile) Jaime Fillol | 6–7, 6–4, 6–4 |
| 2. | 1984 | Curitiba, Brazil | Clay | (Brazil) Nelson Aerts | (Brazil) Ivan Kley (Brazil) Fernando Roese | 6–4, 2–6, 7–6 |
| 3. | 1984 | Helsinki, Finland | Hard | (Switzerland) Jakob Hlasek | (Sweden) Ronnie Båthman (Sweden) Magnus Tideman | 7–6, 6–4 |
| 4. | 1985 | Curitiba, Brazil | Clay | (Brazil) Nelson Aerts | (Netherlands) Tom Nijssen (Netherlands) Johan Vekemans | 7–6, 6–4 |
| 5. | 1988 | Itu, São Paulo, Brazil | Hard | (Brazil) Marcos Hocevar | (Brazil) Ivan Kley (Brazil) Fernando Roese | 6–4, 6–7, 6–4 |
| 6. | 1989 | Goiânia, Brazil | Clay | (Brazil) Marcos Hocevar | (Brazil) Otávio Della (United States) Kevin Lubbers | 6–2, 6–2 |
| 7. | 1991 | Americana, São Paulo, Brazil | Hard | (Brazil) Marcos Hocevar | (Brazil) José Daher (Brazil) Fernando Roese | 7–6, 6–4 |
| 8. | 1992 | Belo Horizonte, Brazil | Clay | (Brazil) Nelson Aerts | (Portugal) João Cunha e Silva (Brazil) César Kist | 6–1, 6–7, 6–2 |

== Notes ==
- According to online ITF records his best performance at the French Open was the third round in 1983 with Sergio Casal. The ATP website however credits this to his brother Marcos.
