= Mauro Menezes =

Former professional tennis player from Brazil

- Country (sports): Brazil
- Born: 27 July 1963 (age 62); São Paulo, Brazil, Brazil
- Height: 1.93 m (6 ft 4 in)
- Plays: Right-handed
- Prize money: $162,044

Singles
- Career record: 3–14
- Career titles: 0
- Highest ranking: No. 184 (15 January 1990)

Grand Slam singles results
- Australian Open: 1R (1992)
- French Open: 2R (1988)
- Wimbledon: 2R (1989)
- US Open: 2R (1988)

Doubles
- Career record: 40–47
- Career titles: 1
- Highest ranking: No. 62 (22 May 1989)

Grand Slam doubles results
- French Open: 2R (1988)

Mauro Menezes (born 27 July 1963) is a former professional tennis player from Brazil.

Menezes enjoyed most of his tennis success while playing doubles. During his career, he won one doubles title. He achieved a career-high doubles ranking of World No. 62 in 1989.

== Career finals ==
=== Doubles (1 title, 4 runner-ups) ===
Result	W/L	Date	Tournament	Surface	Partner	Opponents	Score
Loss	0–1	1989	Guarujá, Brazil	Hard	(Brazil) César Kist	(Brazil) Ricardo Acioly (Brazil) Dácio Campos	6–7, 6–7
Loss	0–2	1989	Rome, Italy	Clay	(Brazil) Danilo Marcelino	(United States) Jim Courier (United States) Pete Sampras	4–6, 3–6
Win	1–2	1990	Itaparica, Brazil	Hard	(Brazil) Fernando Roese	(Spain) Tomás Carbonell (Spain) Marcos Aurelio Gorriz	7–6, 7–5
Loss	1–3	1991	Brasília, Brazil	Clay	(Brazil) Ricardo Acioly	(United States) Kent Kinnear (The Bahamas) Roger Smith	4–6, 3–6
Loss	1–4	1992	Maceió, Brazil	Hard	(Brazil) Ricardo Acioly	(Argentina) Gabriel Markus (United States) John Sobel	4–6, 6–1, 5–7
