= César Kist =

Brazilian tennis player

- Country (sports): Brazil
- Born: October 22, 1964 (age 60); Santa Cruz, Brazil
- Height: 5 ft 11 in (180 cm)
- Plays: Right-handed
- Prize money: $127,040

Singles
- Career record: 6–18
- Highest ranking: No. 119 (July 14, 1986)

Doubles
- Career record: 24–36
- Highest ranking: No. 79 (April 13, 1987)

César Kist (born October 22, 1964) is a former professional tennis player from Brazil.

Kist enjoyed most of his tennis success while playing doubles. During his career he finished runner-up at 2 doubles events. He achieved a career-high doubles ranking of world No. 79 in 1987.

== Career finals ==
=== Doubles (2 runner-ups) ===
Result	W/L	Date	Tournament	Surface	Partner	Opponents	Score
Loss	0–1	Aug 1986	Washington D.C., U.S.	Clay	(Brazil) Ricardo Acioly	(Chile) Hans Gildemeister (Ecuador) Andrés Gómez	3–6, 5–7
Loss	0–2	Feb 1989	Guarujá, Brazil	Hard	(Brazil) Mauro Menezes	(Brazil) Ricardo Acioly (Brazil) Dácio Campos	6–7, 6–7
