= Ivan Kley =

Brazilian tennis player (1958–2025)

- Country (sports): Brazil
- Born: 29 June 1958 Novo Hamburgo, Rio Grande do Sul, Brazil
- Died: 3 April 2025 (aged 66) Itajai, Santa Catarina, Brazil
- Height: 6 ft 0 in (183 cm)
- Plays: Right-handed
- Prize money: $196,614

Singles
- Career record: 14–40
- Highest ranking: No. 81 (29 December 1986)

Grand Slam singles results
- French Open: 1R (1985, 1987)
- Wimbledon: 1R (1987)

Doubles
- Career record: 29–44
- Career titles: 1
- Highest ranking: No. 56 (29 July 1985)

Grand Slam doubles results
- French Open: 2R (1985, 1987)
- Wimbledon: 1R (1985)
- US Open: 1R (1985)

Ivan Kley (29 June 1958 – 3 April 2025) was a Brazilian professional tennis player.

During his career, he won one doubles title. He achieved a career-high doubles ranking of world number 56 in 1985.

Kley served as coach and high-performance technical coordinator for the tennis team at Itamirim Clube de Campo, located in Itajaí, in the state of Santa Catarina.

== Tennis career ==
A right-hander, he began playing tennis at the age of eight. His professional career lasted fifteen years, from age 17 in 1975 until 1990.

Kley participated in three Davis Cup ties representing Brazil against Spain, Uruguay, and Venezuela.

In singles, he won a title in Campos do Jordão and was runner-up in Forest Hills, in the United States. In doubles, he won the ATP event at the Torneo Conde de Godó in Spain.

His best singles ranking on the ATP Tour was No. 81, and his best doubles ranking was No. 56. He achieved a unique feat by winning, on the same day, the national titles in singles, doubles, and mixed doubles in Brazil.

He developed his own training method for tennis players, aiming to help them progress in the sport. He coached several prominent players at both junior and professional levels, including André Ghem, and continued to compete in seniors tournaments until his death.

== Personal life and death ==
Ivan Kley was the father of singer Vitor Kley.

On 3 April 2025, Kley died in Itajaí from a pulmonary embolism. He was 66.

== Grand Prix career finals ==
=== Doubles: 2 (1–1) ===
Result	W-L	Date	Tournament	Surface	Partner	Opponents	Score
Loss	0–1	May 1985	Forest Hills, U.S.	Clay	(Brazil) Givaldo Barbosa	(United States) Ken Flach (United States) Robert Seguso	5–7, 2–6
Win	1–1	May 1985	Madrid, Spain	Clay	(Brazil) Givaldo Barbosa	(Spain) Jorge Bardou (Spain) Alberto Tous	7–6, 6–4

== See also ==
- List of Brazil Davis Cup team representatives
