= 1990 GTE U.S. Men's Hard Court Championships – Doubles =

Doubles
- 1990 GTE U.S. Men's Hard Court Championships

Final
- Champions: (United States) Scott Davis (United States) David Pate
- Runners-up: (Canada) Grant Connell (Canada) Glenn Michibata
- Score: 7–6, 7–6

Details
- Draw: 28 (3WC/2Q)
- Seeds: 8

Events
Singles	Doubles
← 1989 ·	Indianapolis Tennis Championships	· 1991 →

Pieter Aldrich and Danie Visser were the defending champions, but lost in the quarterfinals to Jeremy Bates and Kevin Curren.

Scott Davis and David Pate won the title by defeating Grant Connell and Glenn Michibata 7–6, 7–6 in the final.

== Seeds ==
The first four seeds received a bye to the second round.

1. (South Africa) Pieter Aldrich / (South Africa) Danie Visser (quarterfinals)
2. (Canada) Grant Connell / (Canada) Glenn Michibata (final)
3. (Mexico) Jorge Lozano / (United States) Todd Witsken (semifinals)
4. (United States) Scott Davis / (United States) David Pate (final)
5. (France) Guy Forget / (Switzerland) Jakob Hlasek (second round)
6. (Australia) Darren Cahill / (Australia) Mark Kratzmann (second round)
7. (United States) Doug Flach / (United States) Robert Seguso (quarterfinals)
8. (United Kingdom) Jeremy Bates / (United States) Kevin Curren (semifinals)

== Draw ==
=== Key ===
- Q = Qualifier
- WC = Wild card
- LL = Lucky loser
- Alt = Alternate
- ITF = ITF entry
- PR = Protected ranking
- SR = Special ranking
- SE = Special exempt
- JE = Junior exempt
- JR = Junior Accelerator Programme entrant
- CO = College Accelerator Programme entrant
- NG = Next Gen Accelerator Program entrant
- w/o = Walkover
- r = Retired
- d = Defaulted

=== Finals ===
Semifinals
8	(United Kingdom) Jeremy Bates (United States) Kevin Curren	3	5
4	(United States) Scott Davis (United States) David Pate	6	7
3	(Mexico) Jorge Lozano (United States) Todd Witsken	3	5
2	(Canada) Grant Connell (Canada) Glenn Michibata	6	7

Final
4	(United States) Scott Davis (United States) David Pate	7	7
2	(Canada) Grant Connell (Canada) Glenn Michibata	6	6

=== Top half ===
First round
Q	(Sweden) V Jansson (United States) K Thorne	6	7
(Australia) J Stoltenberg (Australia) S Youl	3	5
(United States) J Courier (United States) P Sampras	6	7
(United States) J Rive (United States) R Van't Hof	3	5
(Iran) M Bahrami (France) JP Fleurian	3	5
8	(United Kingdom) J Bates (United States) K Curren	6	7
(United Kingdom) N Broad (South Africa) G Muller	6	6	2
WC	(United States) B Garrow (United States) S Salumaa	4	7	6
(Australia) P Doohan (Australia) L Warder	6	5
(France) Y Noah (United States) R Reneberg	7	7
(Nigeria) N Odizor (Kenya) P Wekesa	2	4
5	(France) G Forget (Switzerland) J Hlasek	6	6

Second round
1	(South Africa) P Aldrich (South Africa) D Visser	7	7
Q	(Sweden) V Jansson (United States) K Thorne	6	6
(United States) J Courier (United States) P Sampras
8	(United Kingdom) J Bates (United States) K Curren	w/o
4	(United States) S Davis (United States) D Pate	6	7
WC	(United States) B Garrow (United States) S Salumaa	3	6
(France) Y Noah (United States) R Reneberg	7	7
5	(France) G Forget (Switzerland) J Hlasek	6	6

Quarterfinals
1	(South Africa) P Aldrich (South Africa) D Visser	2	3
8	(United Kingdom) J Bates (United States) K Curren	6	6
4	(United States) S Davis (United States) D Pate	7	7
(France) Y Noah (United States) R Reneberg	6	6

Semifinals
8	(United Kingdom) J Bates (United States) K Curren	3	5
4	(United States) S Davis (United States) D Pate	6	7

=== Bottom half ===
First round
6	(Australia) D Cahill (Australia) M Kratzmann	6	6	6
(United States) P Galbraith (United States) K Jones	7	3	2
(United States) S Cannon (United States) J Canter	4	6	4
(New Zealand) K Evernden (United States) K Kinnear	6	3	6
Q	(South Africa) D Nainkin (South Africa) G Stafford	3	1
(Mexico) L Lavalle (Czechoslovakia) K Nováček	6	6
7	(United States) D Flach (United States) R Seguso	6	7
WC	(United States) J Berger (United States) T Siegel	4	5
(Austria) A Antonitsch (Italy) D Nargiso	5	4
(United States) M Davis (South Africa) S Kruger	7	6
WC	(United States) S Bryan (United States) T Martin	6	3	5
(Australia) B Dyke (Sweden) P Lundgren	1	6	7

Second round
6	(Australia) D Cahill (Australia) M Kratzmann	2	6	5
(New Zealand) K Evernden (United States) K Kinnear	6	3	7
(Mexico) L Lavalle (Czechoslovakia) K Nováček	4	6	2
3	(Mexico) J Lozano (United States) T Witsken	6	3	6
7	(United States) D Flach (United States) R Seguso	6	6
(United States) M Davis (South Africa) S Kruger	4	4
(Australia) B Dyke (Sweden) P Lundgren	6	4
2	(Canada) G Connell (Canada) G Michibata	7	6

Quarterfinals
(New Zealand) K Evernden (United States) K Kinnear	6	2	2
3	(Mexico) J Lozano (United States) T Witsken	4	6	6
7	(United States) D Flach (United States) R Seguso	3	7	4
2	(Canada) G Connell (Canada) G Michibata	6	6	6

Semifinals
3	(Mexico) J Lozano (United States) T Witsken	3	5
2	(Canada) G Connell (Canada) G Michibata	6	7
