= 1990 Banespa Open =

- Date: 2–8 April
- Edition: 2nd
- Category: ATP World Series
- Draw: 32S / 16D
- Prize money: $225,000
- Location: Rio de Janeiro, Brazil
- Venue: Praia de Copacabana

Champions

Singles
- (Brazil) Luiz Mattar

Doubles
- (United States) Brian Garrow / (United States) Sven Salumaa
← 1989 ·	Banespa Open

The 1990 Banespa Open, also known as the Rio de Janeiro Open, was a men's tennis tournament played on outdoor carpet courts. It was the 2nd edition of the event known that year as the Banespa Open, and was part of the ATP World Series of the 1990 ATP Tour. It took place in Rio de Janeiro, Brazil, from 2 April through 8 April 1990. First-seeded Luiz Mattar won his second consecutive singles title at the event.

== Finals ==
=== Singles ===
(Brazil) Luiz Mattar defeated (Canada) Andrew Sznajder, 6–4, 6–4

- It was Mattar's first singles title of the year, and the fifth of his career.

=== Doubles ===
(United States) Brian Garrow / (United States) Sven Salumaa defeated (Brazil) Nelson Aerts / (Brazil) Fernando Roese, 7–5, 6–3

- It was Garrow's first doubles title of the year, and the second of his career.
- It was Salumaa's first doubles title of the year, and of his career.
