= 1989 GTE U.S. Men's Hard Court Championships – Singles =

Singles
- 1989 GTE U.S. Men's Hard Court Championships

Final
- Champion: (United States) John McEnroe
- Runner-up: (United States) Jay Berger
- Score: 6–4, 4–6, 6–4

Events
Singles	Doubles
← 1988 ·	GTE U.S. Men's Hard Court Championships	· 1990 →

Boris Becker was the defending champion but did not compete that year.

John McEnroe won in the final 6–4, 4–6, 6–4 against Jay Berger.

== Seeds ==
The top eight seeds received a bye to the second round.

1. (Sweden) Stefan Edberg (semifinals)
2. (United States) John McEnroe (champion)
3. (United States) Tim Mayotte (quarterfinals)
4. (United States) Aaron Krickstein (semifinals)
5. (United States) Jay Berger (final)
6. (Peru) Jaime Yzaga (second round)
7. (Sweden) Peter Lundgren (second round)
8. (United States) Todd Witsken (quarterfinals)
9. (United States) Derrick Rostagno (first round)
10. (United States) Richard Matuszewski (quarterfinals)
11. (United States) Jim Pugh (first round)
12. (South Africa) Pieter Aldrich (first round)
13. (Australia) Wally Masur (third round)
14. (United States) Glenn Layendecker (second round)
15. (Netherlands) Michiel Schapers (third round)
16. (United States) Richey Reneberg (second round)

== Draw ==
=== Key ===
- Q = Qualifier
- WC = Wild card
- LL = Lucky loser
- Alt = Alternate
- SE = Special exempt
- PR = Protected ranking
- ITF = ITF entry
- JE = Junior exempt
- w/o = Walkover
- r = Retired
- d = Defaulted
- SR = Special ranking

=== Finals ===
Semifinals
1	(Sweden) Stefan Edberg	4	2
5	(United States) Jay Berger	6	6
4	(United States) Aaron Krickstein	2	6
2	(United States) John McEnroe	6	7

Final
5	(United States) Jay Berger	4	6	4
2	(United States) John McEnroe	6	4	6

=== Top half ===
==== Section 1 ====
First round
(South Africa) D Visser	6	6
Q	(United States) M Flur	2	4
(United States) D Pate	1	7	6
(Canada) G Michibata	6	5	3
(Sweden) T Högstedt	1	4
16	(United States) R Reneberg	6	6
10	(United States) R Matuszewski	6	6
Q	(United States) S Cannon	3	0
Q	(United States) B Pearce	6	6
(Portugal) N Marques	4	3
(Canada) A Sznajder	6	6
(Senegal) Y Doumbia	4	3

Second round
1	(Sweden) S Edberg	6	6
(South Africa) D Visser	4	4
(United States) D Pate	6	3	6
16	(United States) R Reneberg	4	6	2
10	(United States) R Matuszewski	7	7
Q	(United States) B Pearce	6	6
(Canada) A Sznajder	6	6
7	(Sweden) P Lundgren	3	4

Third round
1	(Sweden) S Edberg	6	6
(United States) D Pate	3	1
10	(United States) R Matuszewski	6	3	6
(Canada) A Sznajder	2	6	1

Quarterfinals
1	(Sweden) S Edberg	4	6	7
10	(United States) R Matuszewski	6	4	5

==== Section 2 ====
First round
(United States) J Arias	6	7
(Australia) C Limberger	3	6
WC	(United States) R Leach	4	7	5
(United States) D Wheaton	6	6	7
(United Kingdom) N Broad	6	4	6
14	(United States) G Layendecker	3	6	7
12	(South Africa) P Aldrich	6	3	2
Q	(South Africa) B Moir	4	6	6
(Venezuela) N Pereira	7	6
WC	(United States) P McEnroe	6	3
(Australia) J Frawley	4	1
Q	(United States) M Robertson	6	6

Second round
3	(United States) T Mayotte	5	6	6
(United States) J Arias	7	2	2
(United States) D Wheaton	6	3	6
14	(United States) G Layendecker	4	6	2
Q	(South Africa) B Moir	6	6	6
(Venezuela) N Pereira	7	4	0
Q	(United States) M Robertson	3	3
5	(United States) J Berger	6	6

Third round
3	(United States) T Mayotte	6	6
(United States) D Wheaton	3	3
Q	(South Africa) B Moir	1	1
5	(United States) J Berger	6	6

Quarterfinals
3	(United States) T Mayotte	6	5
5	(United States) J Berger	7	7

=== Bottom half ===
==== Section 3 ====
First round
Q	(United States) M Barba	4	5
(Sweden) J Carlsson	6	7
(United States) P Sampras	4	7	6
WC	(United States) K Kinnear	6	6	4
(Australia) S Youl	6	3	7
11	(United States) J Pugh	4	6	5
13	(Australia) W Masur	6	2	7
WC	(United States) S Bryan	2	6	6
(Finland) O Rahnasto	7	6	3
(Canada) C Pridham	6	7	6
WC	(United States) T Ho	6	2	5
(Italy) D Nargiso	2	6	7

Second round
6	(Peru) J Yzaga	2	3
(Sweden) J Carlsson	6	6
(United States) P Sampras	6	6
(Australia) S Youl	1	4
13	(Australia) W Masur	6	7
(Canada) C Pridham	1	5
(Italy) D Nargiso	1	4
4	(United States) A Krickstein	6	6

Third round
(Sweden) J Carlsson	3	4
(United States) P Sampras	6	6
13	(Australia) W Masur	6	5
4	(United States) A Krickstein	7	7

Quarterfinals
(United States) P Sampras	5	3
4	(United States) A Krickstein	7	6

==== Section 4 ====
First round
(India) V Amritraj	6	7
(France) O Delaître	3	5
(Australia) M Kratzmann	6	2	6
(United States) J Brown	3	6	7
(South Africa) G Muller	6	7
9	(United States) D Rostagno	3	6
15	(Netherlands) M Schapers	7	3	6
(Argentina) J Frana	6	6	3
(United Kingdom) J Bates	6	6
(France) T Tulasne	4	1
(United States) D Cassidy	6	7
Q	(United States) T Nelson	4	6

Second round
8	(United States) T Witsken	7	6
(India) V Amritraj	6	3
(United States) J Brown	4	4
(South Africa) G Muller	6	6
15	(Netherlands) M Schapers	6	6
(United Kingdom) J Bates	2	2
(United States) D Cassidy	2	2
2	(United States) J McEnroe	6	6

Third round
8	(United States) T Witsken	7	6
(South Africa) G Muller	5	3
15	(Netherlands) M Schapers	6	1	2
2	(United States) J McEnroe	4	6	6

Quarterfinals
8	(United States) T Witsken	1	0
2	(United States) J McEnroe	6	6
