= 1990 GTE U.S. Men's Hard Court Championships – Singles =

Singles
- 1990 GTE U.S. Men's Hard Court Championships

Final
- Champion: (Germany) Boris Becker
- Runner-up: (Sweden) Peter Lundgren
- Score: 6–3, 6–4

Details
- Draw: 56 (5WC/7Q/1LL)
- Seeds: 16

Events
Singles	Doubles
← 1989 ·	Indianapolis Tennis Championships	· 1991 →

John McEnroe was the defending champion, but lost in the third round to Kelly Evernden.

Boris Becker won the title by defeating Peter Lundgren 6–3, 6–4 in the final.

== Seeds ==
The first eight seeds received a bye to the second round.

1. (West Germany) Boris Becker (champion)
2. (United States) Andre Agassi (quarterfinals)
3. (United States) Aaron Krickstein (third round)
4. (United States) Jay Berger (semifinals)
5. (United States) John McEnroe (third round)
6. (United States) Pete Sampras (quarterfinals)
7. (Argentina) Martín Jaite (second round)
8. (United States) Jim Courier (quarterfinals, retired)
9. (France) Guy Forget (first round)
10. (Czechoslovakia) Karel Nováček (first round, retired)
11. (Germany) Carl-Uwe Steeb (first round)
12. (France) Yannick Noah (first round)
13. (Switzerland) Jakob Hlasek (third round)
14. (United States) Richey Reneberg (semifinals)
15. (United States) Kevin Curren (third round)
16. (South Africa) Gary Muller (first round)

== Draw ==
=== Key ===
- Q = Qualifier
- WC = Wild card
- LL = Lucky loser
- Alt = Alternate
- ITF = ITF entry
- PR = Protected ranking
- SR = Special ranking
- SE = Special exempt
- JE = Junior exempt
- JR = Junior Accelerator Programme entrant
- CO = College Accelerator Programme entrant
- NG = Next Gen Accelerator Program entrant
- w/o = Walkover
- r = Retired
- d = Defaulted

=== Finals ===
Quarterfinals
1	(Germany) Boris Becker	4	7	3
8	(United States) Jim Courier	6	5	1^{r}
4	(United States) Jay Berger	5	6	6
(New Zealand) Kelly Evernden	7	1	3
6	(United States) Pete Sampras	6	1	6
14	(United States) Richey Reneberg	3	6	7
(Sweden) Peter Lundgren	6	6
2	(United States) Andre Agassi	4	0

Semifinals
1	(Germany) Boris Becker	6	6
4	(United States) Jay Berger	4	3
14	(United States) Richey Reneberg	4	4
(Sweden) Peter Lundgren	6	6

Final
1	(Germany) Boris Becker	6	6
(Sweden) Peter Lundgren	3	4

=== Top half ===
==== Section 1 ====
First round
(United States) D Pate	7	2	3
(United States) B Garrow	5	6	6
WC	(United States) K Kinnear	6	7
(Austria) A Antonitsch	0	5
(United States) J Tarango	6	4	6
15	(United States) K Curren	4	6	7
9	(France) G Forget	6	3	2
(Australia) J Stoltenberg	4	6	6
(United States) K Jones	7	6	7
(Finland) A Rahunen	5	7	5
Q	(South Africa) W Ferreira	6	7	4
(India) R Krishnan	7	6	6

Second round
1	(Germany) B Becker	6	6
(United States) B Garrow	2	4
WC	(United States) K Kinnear	4	6	5
15	(United States) K Curren	6	2	7
(Australia) J Stoltenberg	7	7
(United States) K Jones	5	5
(India) R Krishnan	3	3
8	(United States) J Courier	6	6

Third round
1	(Germany) B Becker	7	6
15	(United States) K Curren	6	4
(Australia) J Stoltenberg	6	3	2
8	(United States) J Courier	4	6	6

Quarterfinals
1	(Germany) B Becker	4	7	3
8	(United States) J Courier	6	5	1^{r}

==== Section 2 ====
First round
(United States) S Davis	6	4	2
(Australia) D Cahill	3	6	6
LL	(United States) J Canter	4	4
Q	(Kenya) P Wekesa	6	6
(United States) J Rive	3	4
13	(Switzerland) J Hlasek	6	6
12	(France) Y Noah	5	2
(New Zealand) K Evernden	7	6
Q	(Canada) M Laurendeau	6	7
(South Africa) M Kaplan	4	6
(Canada) G Connell	7	1	6
WC	(United States) K Flach	5	6	1

Second round
4	(United States) J Berger	6	0	7
(Australia) D Cahill	1	6	5
Q	(Kenya) P Wekesa	4	2
13	(Switzerland) J Hlasek	6	6
(New Zealand) K Evernden	4	6	7
Q	(Canada) M Laurendeau	6	1	5
(Canada) G Connell	4	4
5	(United States) J McEnroe	6	6

Third round
4	(United States) J Berger	6	6
13	(Switzerland) J Hlasek	4	2
(New Zealand) K Evernden	6	6
5	(United States) J McEnroe	2	4

Quarterfinals
4	(United States) J Berger	5	6	6
(New Zealand) K Evernden	7	1	3

=== Bottom half ===
==== Section 3 ====
First round
(Soviet Union) A Volkov	4	6	6
(France) O Delaître	6	4	0
(United States) T Witsken	6	6
(Germany) P Kühnen	4	1
(Australia) B Dyke	6	6	6
11	(Germany) CU Steeb	7	4	0
14	(United States) R Reneberg	6	6
(Australia) M Kratzmann	0	3
(United States) L Shiras	6	6
(United States) R Weiss	2	4
Q	(South Africa) M Ondruska	7	6
(Australia) S Youl	6	3

Second round
6	(United States) P Sampras	6	7
(Soviet Union) A Volkov	2	6
(United States) T Witsken	7	6
(Australia) B Dyke	5	3
14	(United States) R Reneberg	6	6
(United States) L Shiras	0	1
Q	(South Africa) M Ondruska	1	1
3	(United States) A Krickstein	6	6

Third round
6	(United States) P Sampras	6	6	6
(United States) T Witsken	7	3	4
14	(United States) R Reneberg	6	6
3	(United States) A Krickstein	4	2

Quarterfinals
6	(United States) P Sampras	6	1	6
14	(United States) R Reneberg	3	6	7

==== Section 4 ====
First round
Q	(United States) G Failla	3	1
(Sweden) P Lundgren	6	6
Q	(Japan) S Matsuoka	2	6	6
(France) JP Fleurian	6	2	4
(France) T Champion	6	3
10	(Czechoslovakia) K Nováček	2	1^{r}
16	(South Africa) G Muller	4	4
Q	(Mexico) L Lavalle	6	6
WC	(United States) S Bryan	6	4	5
WC	(United States) T Martin	4	6	7
WC	(United States) R Seguso	6	7
(United Kingdom) J Bates	4	6

Second round
7	(Argentina) M Jaite	6	3	3
(Sweden) P Lundgren	4	6	6
Q	(Japan) S Matsuoka	2	6	6
(France) T Champion	6	2	1
Q	(Mexico) L Lavalle	1	4
WC	(United States) T Martin	6	6
WC	(United States) R Seguso	2	3
2	(United States) A Agassi	6	6

Third round
(Sweden) P Lundgren	6	1	7
Q	(Japan) S Matsuoka	4	6	5
WC	(United States) T Martin	6	4
2	(United States) A Agassi	7	6

Quarterfinals
(Sweden) P Lundgren	6	6
2	(United States) A Agassi	4	0
