= 1992 Purex Tennis Championships =

- Date: February 24 – March 2
- Edition: 5th
- Category: World Series
- Draw: 32S / 16D
- Prize money: $235,000
- Surface: Hard / outdoor
- Location: Scottsdale, Arizona, U.S.

Champions

Singles
- (Italy) Stefano Pescosolido

Doubles
- (United States) Mark Keil / (United States) Dave Randall
| ← 1989 · | Tennis Channel Open | · 1993 → |

The 1992 Purex Tennis Championships was an Association of Tennis Professionals men's tennis tournament held in Scottsdale, Arizona in the United States that was part of the World Series of the 1992 ATP Tour. It was the fifth edition of the tournament and was held from February 24 to March 2, 1992. Unseeded Stefano Pescosolido won the singles title.

== Finals ==
=== Singles ===
(Italy) Stefano Pescosolido defeated (United States) Brad Gilbert 6–0, 1–6, 6–4

- It was Pescosolido's only singles title of the year and the 1st of his career.

=== Doubles ===
(United States) Mark Keil / (United States) Dave Randall defeated (United States) Kent Kinnear / (United States) Sven Salumaa 4–6, 6–1, 6–2

- It was Keil's only title of the year and the 1st of his career. It was Randall's only title of the year and the 1st of his career.
