= 1992 Lipton International Players Championships – Men's doubles =

Men's doubles
- 1992 Lipton International Players Championships

Final
- Champion: (United States) Ken Flach (United States) Todd Witsken
- Runner-up: (United States) Kent Kinnear (United States) Sven Salumaa
- Score: 6–4, 6–3

Events
| Singles | men | women |
| Doubles | men | women |
- Lipton International Players Championships

Wayne Ferreira and Piet Norval were the defending champions, but lost in the semifinals this year.

Ken Flach and Todd Witsken won the title, defeating Kent Kinnear and Sven Salumaa 6–4, 6–3 in the final.

== Seeds ==
1. (Canada) Grant Connell / (Canada) Glenn Michibata (third round)
2. (United States) Scott Davis / (United States) David Pate (second round)
3. (United States) Ken Flach / (United States) Todd Witsken (champions)
4. (Netherlands) Tom Nijssen / (Czechoslovakia) Cyril Suk (third round)
5. (United States) Luke Jensen / (Australia) Laurie Warder (quarterfinals)
6. (United States) Kelly Jones / (United States) Rick Leach (second round)
7. (South Africa) Wayne Ferreira / (South Africa) Piet Norval (semifinals)
8. N/A
9. (Spain) Sergio Casal / (Spain) Emilio Sánchez (second round)
10. (Argentina) Javier Frana / (Mexico) Leonardo Lavalle (third round)
11. (United States) Steve DeVries / (Australia) David Macpherson (third round)
12. (Netherlands) Hendrik Jan Davids / (Netherlands) Paul Haarhuis (second round)
13. (United States) Kevin Curren / (South Africa) Gary Muller (third round)
14. (United States) Kent Kinnear / (United States) Sven Salumaa (final)
15. (Sweden) Stefan Edberg / (United States) Robert Seguso (second round)
16. (Sweden) Ronnie Båthman / (Sweden) Rikard Bergh (semifinals)

== Draw ==
Key

- Q = Qualifier
- WC = Wild card
- LL = Lucky loser
- Alt = Alternate
- ITF = ITF entry
- PR = Protected ranking
- SR = Special ranking
- SE = Special exempt
- JE = Junior exempt
- JR = Junior Accelerator Programme entrant
- CO = College Accelerator Programme entrant
- NG = Next Gen Accelerator Program entrant
- w/o = Walkover
- r = Retired
- d = Defaulted

=== Finals ===
Semifinals
16 | (Sweden) Ronnie Båthman (Sweden) Rikard Bergh | 4 | 5
14 | (United States) Kent Kinnear (United States) Sven Salumaa | 6 | 7
3 | (United States) Ken Flach (United States) Todd Witsken | 3 | 7 | 7
7 | (South Africa) Wayne Ferreira (South Africa) Piet Norval | 6 | 5 | 6

Final
14 | (United States) Kent Kinnear (United States) Sven Salumaa | 4 | 3
3 | (United States) Ken Flach (United States) Todd Witsken | 6 | 6

=== Top half ===
==== Section 1 ====
First round
(United States) P Galbraith (United States) B Garrow | 6 | 6
(United States) P McEnroe (The Bahamas) R Smith | 2 | 4
(South Africa) P Aldrich (South Africa) D Visser | 6 | 7 | 6
(United States) J Palmer (United States) J Stark | 7 | 6 | 3
(Italy) D Nargiso (Italy) S Pescosolido | 4 | 4
(Netherlands) R Krajicek (Netherlands) J Siemerink | 6 | 6
(Sweden) J Gunnarsson (Czechoslovakia) K Nováček | 3 | 5
(United States) M Keil (United States) D Randall | 6 | 7

Second round
1 | (Canada) G Connell (Canada) G Michibata | 7 | 7
(United States) P Galbraith (United States) B Garrow | 6 | 5
(South Africa) P Aldrich (South Africa) D Visser | 6 | 6 | 6
16 | (Sweden) R Båthman (Sweden) R Bergh | 2 | 7 | 7
9 | (Spain) S Casal (Spain) E Sánchez | 4 | 3
(Netherlands) R Krajicek (Netherlands) J Siemerink | 6 | 6
(United States) M Keil (United States) D Randall | 2 | 6 | 6
LL | (South Africa) M Barnard (South Africa) B Haygarth | 6 | 4 | 3

Third round
1 | (Canada) G Connell (Canada) G Michibata | 6 | 6 | 6
16 | (Sweden) R Båthman (Sweden) R Bergh | 7 | 4 | 7
(Netherlands) R Krajicek (Netherlands) J Siemerink
(United States) M Keil (United States) D Randall | w/o

Quarterfinals
16 | (Sweden) R Båthman (Sweden) R Bergh | 6 | 6
(United States) M Keil (United States) D Randall | 0 | 3

==== Section 2 ====
First round
(United States) C Beckman (South Africa) S Kruger | 3 | 3
(Australia) N Borwick (Australia) S Youl | 6 | 6
(United States) G Layendecker (South Africa) B Talbot | 7 | 6 | 7
(United States) F Montana (United States) K Thorne | 5 | 7 | 6
(Brazil) N Aerts (Spain) T Carbonell | 2 | 6 | 1
LL | (South Africa) R Deppe (South Africa) M Ondruska | 6 | 4 | 6
(United States) B Pearce (United States) G Van Emburgh | 6 | 6
(Brazil) R Acioly (Ecuador) N Pereira | 2 | 4

Second round
4 | (Netherlands) T Nijssen (Czechoslovakia) C Suk | 7 | 7
(Australia) N Borwick (Australia) S Youl | 5 | 5
(United States) G Layendecker (South Africa) B Talbot | 4 | 6
14 | (United States) K Kinnear (United States) S Salumaa | 6 | 7
11 | (United States) S DeVries (Australia) D Macpherson | 7 | 6
LL | (South Africa) R Deppe (South Africa) M Ondruska | 5 | 2
(United States) B Pearce (United States) G Van Emburgh | 5 | 6 | 3
5 | (United States) L Jensen (Australia) L Warder | 7 | 1 | 6

Third round
4 | (Netherlands) T Nijssen (Czechoslovakia) C Suk | 4 | 4
14 | (United States) K Kinnear (United States) S Salumaa | 6 | 6
11 | (United States) S DeVries (Australia) D Macpherson | 4 | 1
5 | (United States) L Jensen (Australia) L Warder | 6 | 6

Quarterfinals
14 | (United States) K Kinnear (United States) S Salumaa | 6 | 6 | 6
5 | (United States) L Jensen (Australia) L Warder | 2 | 7 | 3

=== Bottom half ===
==== Section 3 ====
First round
WC | (United States) P Annacone (South Africa) C van Rensburg | 3 | 3
(Switzerland) J Hlasek (Switzerland) M Rosset | 6 | 6
(Australia) M Kratzmann (Australia) W Masur | 6 | 6
(Israel) G Bloom (Netherlands) M Schapers | 1 | 3
(Argentina) G Luza (Argentina) C Miniussi | 4 | 4
(Argentina) P Albano (United States) S Cannon | 6 | 6
(United States) B Garnett (Sweden) T Svantesson | 3 | 1
Q | (Venezuela) A Mora (Romania) M-I Năstase | 6 | 6

Second round
6 | (United States) K Jones (United States) R Leach | 6 | 2 | 2
(Switzerland) J Hlasek (Switzerland) M Rosset | 2 | 6 | 6
(Australia) M Kratzmann (Australia) W Masur | 6 | 6
12 | (Netherlands) HJ Davids (Netherlands) P Haarhuis | 3 | 1
13 | (United States) K Curren (South Africa) G Muller | 6 | 6
(Argentina) P Albano (United States) S Cannon | 0 | 3
Q | (Venezuela) A Mora (Romania) M-I Năstase | 5 | 7 | 1
3 | (United States) K Flach (United States) T Witsken | 7 | 6 | 6

Third round
(Switzerland) J Hlasek (Switzerland) M Rosset | 6 | 4
(Australia) M Kratzmann (Australia) W Masur | 7 | 6
13 | (United States) K Curren (South Africa) G Muller | 5 | 6 | 3
3 | (United States) K Flach (United States) T Witsken | 7 | 3 | 6

Quarterfinals
(Australia) M Kratzmann (Australia) W Masur | 4 | 6 | 1
3 | (United States) K Flach (United States) T Witsken | 6 | 3 | 6

==== Section 4 ====
First round
(United States) T Nelson (Australia) J Stoltenberg | 6 | 6
(United States) J Brown (United States) S Melville | 3 | 4
(Czechoslovakia) V Flégl (Croatia) G Prpić | 5 | 1
Q | (Germany) C-U Steeb (Germany) M Zoecke | 7 | 6
(Czechoslovakia) P Korda (United States) J Pugh | 6 | 6
(United States) B Shelton (United States) D Wheaton | 4 | 2
(United Kingdom) J Bates (United Kingdom) N Broad | 3 | 3
WC | (Germany) B Becker (Germany) P Kühnen | 6 | 6

Second round
7 | (South Africa) W Ferreira (South Africa) P Norval | 1 | 6 | 6
(United States) T Nelson (Australia) J Stoltenberg | 6 | 2 | 4
Q | (Germany) C-U Steeb (Germany) M Zoecke | 7 | 1 | 4
10 | (Argentina) J Frana (Mexico) L Lavalle | 6 | 6 | 6
15 | (Sweden) S Edberg (United States) R Seguso | 6 | 4
(Czechoslovakia) P Korda (United States) J Pugh | 7 | 6
WC | (Germany) B Becker (Germany) P Kühnen | 6 | 7
2 | (United States) S Davis (United States) D Pate | 4 | 5

Third round
7 | (South Africa) W Ferreira (South Africa) P Norval | 7 | 6
10 | (Argentina) J Frana (Mexico) L Lavalle | 6 | 1
(Czechoslovakia) P Korda (United States) J Pugh | 6 | 7
WC | (Germany) B Becker (Germany) P Kühnen | 0 | 5

Quarterfinals
7 | (South Africa) W Ferreira (South Africa) P Norval | 6 | 3 | 6
(Czechoslovakia) P Korda (United States) J Pugh | 2 | 6 | 4
