= 1989 GTE U.S. Men's Hard Court Championships – Doubles =

Doubles
- 1989 GTE U.S. Men's Hard Court Championships

Final
- Champions: (South Africa) Pieter Aldrich; (South Africa) Danie Visser
- Runners-up: (Australia) Peter Doohan; (Australia) Laurie Warder
- Score: 7–6, 7–6

Events
Singles	Doubles
← 1988 ·	GTE U.S. Men's Hard Court Championships	· 1990 →

Rick Leach and Jim Pugh were the defending champions but lost in the quarterfinals to Grant Connell and Glenn Michibata.

Pieter Aldrich and Danie Visser won in the final 7–6, 7–6 against Peter Doohan and Laurie Warder.

== Seeds ==
The top four seeded teams received byes into the second round.

1. (United States) Rick Leach / (United States) Jim Pugh (quarterfinals)
2. (United States) Ken Flach / (United States) John McEnroe (quarterfinals)
3. (United States) Scott Davis / (United States) David Pate (quarterfinals)
4. (United States) Patrick McEnroe / (United States) Pete Sampras (second round)
5. (Australia) Peter Doohan / (Australia) Laurie Warder (final)
6. (South Africa) Pieter Aldrich / (South Africa) Danie Visser (champions)
7. (United States) Kevin Curren / (South Africa) Gary Muller (semifinals)
8. (Canada) Grant Connell / (Canada) Glenn Michibata (semifinals)

== Draw ==
=== Key ===
- Q = Qualifier
- WC = Wild card
- LL = Lucky loser
- Alt = Alternate
- SE = Special exempt
- PR = Protected ranking
- ITF = ITF entry
- JE = Junior exempt
- w/o = Walkover
- r = Retired
- d = Defaulted
- SR = Special ranking

=== Final ===
Semifinals

Final

8
- (Canada) Grant Connell
- (Canada) Glenn Michibata
6
4

5
- (Australia) Peter Doohan
- (Australia) Laurie Warder
7
6

5
- (Australia) Peter Doohan
- (Australia) Laurie Warder
6
6

6
- (South Africa) Pieter Aldrich
- (South Africa) Danie Visser
7
7

6
- (South Africa) Pieter Aldrich
- (South Africa) Danie Visser
6
6

7
- (United States) Kevin Curren
- (South Africa) Gary Muller
3
4

=== Top half ===
First round

Second round

Quarterfinals

Semifinals

1
- (United States) R Leach
- (United States) J Pugh
5
6
6

- (United Kingdom) N Broad
- (South Africa) S Kruger
3
6
3

- (United States) B Willenborg
- (United States) D Wheaton
7
2
3

- (United States) B Willenborg
- (United States) D Wheaton
6
3
6

1
- (United States) R Leach
- (United States) J Pugh

- (United States) M Flur
- (United States) B Pearce
6
7

8
- (Canada) G Connell
- (Canada) G Michibata
w/o

- (France) O Delaître
- (France) T Tulasne
0
5

- (United States) M Flur
- (United States) B Pearce
6
1
4

- (United States) P Galbraith
- (Finland) O Rahnasto
3
5

8
- (Canada) G Connell
- (Canada) G Michibata
3
6
6

8
- (Canada) G Connell
- (Canada) G Michibata
6
7

8
- (Canada) G Connell
- (Canada) G Michibata
6
4

5
- (Australia) P Doohan
- (Australia) L Warder
7
6

4
- (United States) P McEnroe
- (United States) P Sampras
6
3
2

- (Mexico) A Moreno
- (Peru) J Yzaga
6
6

- (Mexico) A Moreno
- (Peru) J Yzaga
3
6
6

- (France) J-P Fleurian
- (United States) B Man-Son-Hing
3
4

- (Mexico) A Moreno
- (Peru) J Yzaga
6
3

- (United States) T Nelson
- (United States) P Williamson
7
7

5
- (Australia) P Doohan
- (Australia) L Warder
7
6

- (United States) C Beckman
- (South Africa) R Deppe
5
5

- (United States) T Nelson
- (United States) P Williamson
5
6
6

- (United States) B Garnett
- (United States) K Kinnear
3
6

5
- (Australia) P Doohan
- (Australia) L Warder
7
3
7

5
- (Australia) P Doohan
- (Australia) L Warder
6
7

=== Bottom half ===
First round

Second round

Quarterfinals

Semifinals

6
- (South Africa) P Aldrich
- (South Africa) D Visser
6
7

- (United States) M Anger
- (United States) J Arias
3
5

6
- (South Africa) P Aldrich
- (South Africa) D Visser
4
6
6

- (United States) L Jensen
- (United States) R Reneberg
7
6

- (United States) L Jensen
- (United States) R Reneberg
6
3
2

- (United States) G Van Emburgh
- (Australia) S Youl
5
3

6
- (South Africa) P Aldrich
- (South Africa) D Visser
7
7

(Socialist Federal Republic of Yugoslavia) G Ivanišević
(Venezuela) N Pereira
1
3

3
- (United States) S Davis
- (United States) D Pate
5
6

- (Italy) D Nargiso
- (United States) D Rostagno
6
6

- (Italy) D Nargiso
- (United States) D Rostagno
2
3

3
- (United States) S Davis
- (United States) D Pate
6
6

6
- (South Africa) P Aldrich
- (South Africa) D Visser
6
6

7
- (United States) K Curren
- (South Africa) G Muller
6
6

7
- (United States) K Curren
- (South Africa) G Muller
3
4

- (United States) J Berger
- (United States) S Cannon
1
3

7
- (United States) K Curren
- (South Africa) G Muller
6
6

- (United States) S Bryan
- (United States) D Flach
6
6

- (United Kingdom) J Bates
- (Sweden) P Lundgren
3
4

- (United Kingdom) J Bates
- (Sweden) P Lundgren
7
7

7
- (United States) K Curren
- (South Africa) G Muller
6
7

- (United States) G Layendecker
- (Australia) W Masur
6
6

2
- (United States) K Flach
- (United States) J McEnroe
2
6

- (Peru) C di Laura
- (Argentina) J Frana
3
4

- (United States) G Layendecker
- (Australia) W Masur
1
1

2
- (United States) K Flach
- (United States) J McEnroe
6
6
