= 1991 GTE U.S. Men's Hard Court Championships – Singles =

Singles
- 1991 GTE U.S. Men's Hard Court Championships

Final
- Champion: (United States) Pete Sampras
- Runner-up: (Germany) Boris Becker
- Score: 7–6^{(7–2)}, 3–6, 6–3

Details
- Draw: 56 (5WC/7Q)
- Seeds: 16

Events
Singles	Doubles
- Indianapolis Tennis Championships

Boris Becker was the defending champion, but lost in the final to Pete Sampras. The score was 7–6^{(7–2)}, 3–6, 6–3.

== Seeds ==
The first eight seeds received a bye into the second round.

1. (Germany) Boris Becker (final)
2. (United States) Jim Courier (semifinals)
3. (United States) Andre Agassi (third round)
4. (France) Guy Forget (second round)
5. (United States) Pete Sampras (champion)
6. (United States) David Wheaton (semifinals)
7. (Spain) Emilio Sánchez (second round)
8. (Russia) Andrei Cherkasov (quarterfinals)
9. (Switzerland) Jakob Hlasek (quarterfinals)
10. (Russia) Alexander Volkov (third round)
11. (Sweden) Anders Järryd (first round)
12. (United States) Patrick McEnroe (third round)
13. (Haiti) Ronald Agénor (first round)
14. (France) Fabrice Santoro (quarterfinals)
15. (Spain) Francisco Clavet (third round)
16. (Sweden) Christian Bergström (third round)

== Draw ==
Key

- Q = Qualifier
- WC = Wild card
- LL = Lucky loser
- Alt = Alternate
- ITF = ITF entry
- PR = Protected ranking
- SR = Special ranking
- SE = Special exempt
- JE = Junior exempt
- JR = Junior Accelerator Programme entrant
- CO = College Accelerator Programme entrant
- NG = Next Gen Accelerator Program entrant
- w/o = Walkover
- r = Retired
- d = Defaulted

=== Finals ===
Quarterfinals
1	(Germany) Boris Becker	7	7
9	(Switzerland) Jakob Hlasek	5	5
14	(France) Fabrice Santoro	1	4
6	(United States) David Wheaton	6	6
5	(United States) Pete Sampras	7^{7}	6
(Australia) Richard Fromberg	6^{1}	2
8	(Russia) Andrei Cherkasov	2	5
2	(United States) Jim Courier	6	7

Semifinals
1	(Germany) Boris Becker	7^{7}	6
6	(United States) David Wheaton	6^{5}	4
5	(United States) Pete Sampras	6	7^{9}
2	(United States) Jim Courier	3	6^{7}

Final
1	(Germany) Boris Becker	6^{2}	6	3
5	(United States) Pete Sampras	7^{7}	3	6

=== Top half ===
==== Section 1 ====
First round
(United States) D Pate	6	7
(Canada) A Sznajder	4	5
Q	(United States) B Farrow	4	4
(Portugal) N Marques	6	6
(South Africa) W Ferreira	3	3
16	(Sweden) C Bergström	6	6
9	(Switzerland) J Hlasek	7^{8}	6
(Canada) G Connell	6^{6}	3
Q	(Zimbabwe) B Black	3	0
(United States) R Weiss	6	6
(Spain) J Sánchez	5	4
(Australia) J Stoltenberg	7	6

Second round
1	(Germany) B Becker	6	6
(United States) D Pate	3	2
(Portugal) N Marques	6^{2}	3
16	(Sweden) C Bergström	7^{7}	6
9	(Switzerland) J Hlasek	7	3	7
(United States) R Weiss	5	6	5
(Australia) J Stoltenberg	7^{7}	6
7	(Spain) E Sánchez	6^{4}	3

Third round
1	(Germany) B Becker	6	6
16	(Sweden) C Bergström	2	2
9	(Switzerland) J Hlasek	6	6
(Australia) J Stoltenberg	3	4

Quarterfinals
1	(Germany) B Becker	7	7
9	(Switzerland) J Hlasek	5	5

==== Section 2 ====
First round
Q	(United States) K Kinnear	6	6^{7}	7^{7}
(Spain) JF Altur	3	7^{9}	6^{4}
(France) C Pioline	6	6
(Australia) N Borwick	3	1
(Spain) T Carbonell	2	2
14	(France) F Santoro	6	6
11	(Sweden) A Järryd	6^{3}	1
WC	(United States) S Bryan	7^{7}	6
(New Zealand) K Evernden	7^{7}	5	6^{4}
Q	(Ivory Coast) C N'Goran	6^{5}	7	7^{7}
(United States) A Krickstein	6	4	6
Q	(United States) J Stark	3	6	4

Second round
3	(United States) A Agassi	7^{7}	7
Q	(United States) K Kinnear	6^{5}	5
(France) C Pioline	4	7	2
14	(France) F Santoro	6	5	6
WC	(United States) S Bryan	6	3	7^{7}
Q	(Ivory Coast) C N'Goran	2	6	6^{0}
(United States) A Krickstein	4	5
6	(United States) D Wheaton	6	7

Third round
3	(United States) A Agassi	6	5	2
14	(France) F Santoro	2	7	6
WC	(United States) S Bryan	3	5
6	(United States) D Wheaton	6	7

Quarterfinals
14	(France) F Santoro	1	4
6	(United States) D Wheaton	6	6

=== Bottom half ===
==== Section 3 ====
First round
(Sweden) P Lundgren	6	3	2
Q	(South Africa) G Stafford	4	6	6
(Italy) S Pescosolido	6	6
WC	(United States) R Leach	3	3
(United States) B Pearce	5	1
12	(United States) P McEnroe	7	6
13	(Haiti) R Agénor	6	4	6^{11}
Q	(New Zealand) B Steven	4	6	7^{13}
(Australia) R Fromberg	6	6
(United States) S Davis	4	2
(United States) J Brown	4	4
(United States) T Mayotte	6	6

Second round
5	(United States) P Sampras	6	6
Q	(South Africa) G Stafford	4	2
(Italy) S Pescosolido	6^{5}	r
12	(United States) P McEnroe	7^{7}
Q	(New Zealand) B Steven	2	2
(Australia) R Fromberg	6	6
(United States) T Mayotte	7^{8}	6
4	(France) G Forget	6^{6}	1

Third round
5	(United States) P Sampras	6	6
12	(United States) P McEnroe	3	4
(Australia) R Fromberg	6	7
(United States) T Mayotte	1	5

Quarterfinals
5	(United States) P Sampras	7^{7}	6
(Australia) R Fromberg	6^{1}	2

==== Section 4 ====
First round
(United States) T Witsken	6	4	6
(India) R Krishnan	1	6	1
WC	(United States) D Witt	5	6	3
(Japan) S Matsuoka	7	3	6
(South Africa) G Muller	6	2	3
10	(Russia) A Volkov	3	6	6
15	(Spain) F Clavet	7	6
(France) G Raoux	5	2
(France) R Gilbert	6^{5}	6	6
WC	(United States) T Martin	7^{7}	4	4
WC	(United States) J Pugh	7^{8}	5	6
(United States) K Curren	6^{6}	7	3

Second round
8	(Russia) A Cherkasov	2	7^{7}	6
(United States) T Witsken	6	6^{4}	2
(Japan) S Matsuoka	6^{5}	2
10	(Russia) A Volkov	7^{7}	6
15	(Spain) F Clavet	6	6
(France) R Gilbert	3	3
WC	(United States) J Pugh	4	4
2	(United States) J Courier	6	6

Third round
8	(Russia) A Cherkasov	7^{7}	7
10	(Russia) A Volkov	6^{4}	5
15	(Spain) F Clavet	2	1
2	(United States) J Courier	6	6

Quarterfinals
8	(Russia) A Cherkasov	2	5
2	(United States) J Courier	6	7
