= 1990 Banespa Open – Doubles =

Doubles
- 1990 Banespa Open

Final
- Champions: (United States) Brian Garrow (United States) Sven Salumaa
- Runners-up: (Brazil) Nelson Aerts (Brazil) Fernando Roese
- Score: 7–5, 6–3

Details
- Draw: 16
- Seeds: 4

Events
Singles	Doubles
← 1989 ·	Banespa Open

Jorge Lozano and Todd Witsken were the defending champions, but neither of them entered the event that year.
Brian Garrow and Sven Salumaa won the title, defeating Nelson Aerts and Fernando Roese 7–5, 6–3, in the final.

== Seeds ==
1. (Argentina) Javier Frana / (Argentina) Gustavo Luza (quarterfinals)
2. (Brazil) Luiz Mattar / (Brazil) Cássio Motta (first round)
3. (Brazil) Danilo Marcelino / (Brazil) Mauro Menezes (semifinals)
4. (Italy) Simone Colombo / (West Germany) Ricki Osterthun (first round)

== Draw ==
=== Key ===
- Q = Qualifier
- WC = Wild card
- LL = Lucky loser
- Alt = Alternate
- SE = Special exempt
- PR = Protected ranking
- ITF = ITF entry
- JE = Junior exempt
- w/o = Walkover
- r = Retired
- d = Defaulted
- SR = Special ranking

=== Draw ===
First round
1	(Argentina) J Frana (Argentina) G Luza	6	6
(Argentina) H de la Peña (United States) J Sobel	4	3
(United States) D Cassidy (United States) B Shelton	6	6^{7}	6
(Argentina) P Albano (Argentina) G Mirad	3	7^{9}	4
4	(Italy) S Colombo (West Germany) R Osterthun	3	3
(Brazil) R Camargo (Brazil) I Kley	6	6
(Brazil) N Aerts (Brazil) F Roese	4	6	6
(Brazil) R Acioly (Brazil) D Campos	6	3	4
(Argentina) M Ingamaro (Brazil) C Kist	6^{4}	6	6^{2}
(Italy) G Pozzi (Finland) O Rahnasto	7^{7}	3	7^{7}
(West Germany) P Baur (France) O Delaître	6	6^{5}	4
3	(Brazil) D Marcelino (Brazil) M Menezes	2	7^{7}	6
(United Kingdom) N Brown (New Zealand) S Guy	6	6
(West Germany) P Ballauff (Nigeria) N Odizor	2	3
(United States) B Garrow (United States) S Salumaa	6	6
2	(Brazil) L Mattar (Brazil) C Motta	4	2

Quarterfinals
1	(Argentina) J Frana (Argentina) G Luza	4	6^{6}
(United States) D Cassidy (United States) B Shelton	6	7^{8}
(Brazil) R Camargo (Brazil) I Kley	4	6^{5}
(Brazil) N Aerts (Brazil) F Roese	6	7^{7}
(Italy) G Pozzi (Finland) O Rahnasto	3	3
3	(Brazil) D Marcelino (Brazil) M Menezes	6	6
(United Kingdom) N Brown (New Zealand) S Guy	5	7^{7}	5
(United States) B Garrow (United States) S Salumaa	7	6^{4}	7

Semifinals
(United States) D Cassidy (United States) B Shelton	0	6^{2}
(Brazil) N Aerts (Brazil) F Roese	6	7^{7}
3	(Brazil) D Marcelino (Brazil) M Menezes	4	6	4
(United States) B Garrow (United States) S Salumaa	6	4	6

Final
(Brazil) N Aerts (Brazil) F Roese	5	3
(United States) B Garrow (United States) S Salumaa	7	6
