= 1993 Purex Tennis Championships – Doubles =

Tennis tournament

Doubles
- 1993 Tennis Channel Open

Final
- Champions: (United States) Mark Keil (United States) Dave Randall
- Runners-up: (United States) Luke Jensen (Australia) Sandon Stolle
- Score: 7–5, 6–4

Details
- Draw: 16
- Seeds: 4

Events
Singles	Doubles
- Tennis Channel Open

Mark Keil and Dave Randall were the defending champions.

Keil and Randall successfully defended their title, defeating Luke Jensen and Sandon Stolle 7–5, 6–4 in the final.

== Seeds ==
1. N/A
2. (South Africa) Danie Visser / (Australia) Laurie Warder (first round, retired)
3. (Australia) Mark Kratzmann / (Spain) Javier Sánchez (first round)
4. (United States) Kent Kinnear / (United States) Sven Salumaa (quarterfinals)

== Draw ==
Key

- Q = Qualifier
- WC = Wild card
- LL = Lucky loser
- Alt = Alternate
- ITF = ITF entry
- PR = Protected ranking
- SR = Special ranking
- SE = Special exempt
- JE = Junior exempt
- JR = Junior Accelerator Programme entrant
- CO = College Accelerator Programme entrant
- NG = Next Gen Accelerator Program entrant
- w/o = Walkover
- r = Retired
- d = Defaulted

=== Draw ===
First round
Q	(Brazil) C Motta (South Africa) C van Rensburg	6	2	4
(United States) S Cannon (United States) B Garnett	3	6	6
(South Africa) S Kruger (South Africa) M Ondruska	5	2
(Sweden) S Edberg (United States) R Reneberg	7	6
3	(Australia) M Kratzmann (Spain) E Sánchez	2	5
(United States) B Pearce (South Africa) B Talbot	6	7
(United States) M Keil (United States) D Randall	6	2	6
(United States) P Galbraith (United States) S Melville	4	6	3
(United States) L Jensen (Australia) S Stolle	7	7
(United States) M Briggs (United States) T Kronemann	5	6
WC	(United States) A Agassi (United States) B Gilbert	7	4	2
4	(United States) K Kinnear (United States) S Salumaa	6	6	6
LL	(Spain) T Carbonell (Brazil) L Mattar	4	2
(United States) J Pugh (United States) G Van Emburgh	6	6
WC	(United States) J Connors (United Kingdom) J Lloyd	6	3
2	(South Africa) D Visser (Australia) L Warder	2	4^{r}

Quarterfinals
(United States) S Cannon (United States) B Garnett	7	4	4
(Sweden) S Edberg (United States) R Reneberg	6	6	6
(United States) B Pearce (South Africa) B Talbot	6	4	5
(United States) M Keil (United States) D Randall	3	6	7
(United States) L Jensen (Australia) S Stolle	6	6
4	(United States) K Kinnear (United States) S Salumaa	2	2
(United States) J Pugh (United States) G Van Emburgh	7	7
WC	(United States) J Connors (United Kingdom) J Lloyd	6	5

Semifinals
(Sweden) S Edberg (United States) R Reneberg	3	7	4
(United States) M Keil (United States) D Randall	6	5	6
(United States) L Jensen (Australia) S Stolle	6	7
(United States) J Pugh (United States) G Van Emburgh	4	5

Final
(United States) M Keil (United States) D Randall	7	6
(United States) L Jensen (Australia) S Stolle	5	4
