= 1989 Banespa Open =

- Date: 10–16 April
- Edition: 1st
- Category: Grand Prix
- Draw: 32S / 16D
- Prize money: $200,000
- Surface: Carpet / indoor
- Location: Rio de Janeiro, Brazil

Champions

Singles
- (Brazil) Luiz Mattar

Doubles
- (Mexico) Jorge Lozano / (United States) Todd Witsken
- Banespa Open

The 1989 Banespa Open, also known as the Rio de Janeiro Open, was a men's tennis tournament played on indoor carpet courts in Rio de Janeiro, Brazil and was part of the 1989 Nabisco Grand Prix. It was the inaugural edition of the tournament and took place from 10 April through 16 April 1989. First-seeded Luiz Mattar won the singles title.

== Finals ==
=== Singles ===
(Brazil) Luiz Mattar defeated (Argentina) Martín Jaite 6–4, 5–7, 6–4

- It was Mattar's 2nd singles title of the year and the 4th of his career.

=== Doubles ===
(Mexico) Jorge Lozano / (United States) Todd Witsken defeated (United States) Patrick McEnroe / (United States) Tim Wilkison 2–6, 6–4, 6–4

- It was Lozano's 1st title of the year and the 5th of his career. It was Witsken's 1st title of the year and the 5th of his career.
