= 1991 GTE U.S. Men's Hard Court Championships =

- Date: August 12–18
- Edition: 4th
- Category: Championship Series
- Draw: 56S / 28D
- Prize money: $825,000
- Surface: Hard / outdoor
- Location: Indianapolis, IN, U.S.
- Venue: Indianapolis Tennis Center

Champions

Singles
- (United States) Pete Sampras

Doubles
- (United States) Ken Flach / (United States) Robert Seguso
← 1990 ·	Indianapolis Tennis Championships	· 1992 →

The 1991 GTE U.S. Men's Hard Court Championships was a men's tennis tournament played on outdoor hard courts at the Indianapolis Tennis Center in Indianapolis, Indiana in the United States that was part of the Championship Series of the 1991 ATP Tour. It was the fourth edition of the tournament and was held from August 12 through August 18, 1991. Fifth-seeded Pete Sampras won the singles title and earned $137,500 first-prize money.

== Finals ==
=== Singles ===
(United States) Pete Sampras defeated (Germany) Boris Becker 7–6^{(7–2)}, 3–6, 6–3

- It was Sampras' 2nd singles title of the year and the 6th of his career.

=== Doubles ===
(United States) Ken Flach / (United States) Robert Seguso defeated (United States) Kent Kinnear / (United States) Sven Salumaa 7–6, 6–4

- It was Flach's 3rd doubles title of the year and the 29th of his career. It was Seguso's 3rd doubles title of the year and the 29th of his career.
