= 1989 Banespa Open – Singles =

Singles
- 1989 Banespa Open

Final
- Champion: (Brazil) Luiz Mattar
- Runner-up: (Argentina) Martín Jaite
- Score: 6–4, 5–7, 6–4

Details
- Draw: 32
- Seeds: 8

Events
Singles	Doubles
Banespa Open	· 1990 →

Luiz Mattar won in the final 6–4, 5–7, 6–4 against Martín Jaite.

== Seeds ==
A champion seed is indicated in bold text while text in italics indicates the round in which that seed was eliminated.

1. (Brazil) **Luiz Mattar (champion)**
2. (Argentina) Horacio de la Peña (quarterfinals)
3. (Argentina) Martín Jaite (final)
4. (Argentina) Eduardo Bengoechea (quarterfinals)
5. (Brazil) Cássio Motta (semifinals)
6. (Argentina) Javier Frana (first round)
7. (United States) Todd Witsken (semifinals)
8. (United States) Tim Wilkison (first round)

== Draw ==
=== Key ===
- Q = Qualifier
- WC = Wild card
- LL = Lucky loser
- Alt = Alternate
- SE = Special exempt
- PR = Protected ranking
- ITF = ITF entry
- JE = Junior exempt
- w/o = Walkover
- r = Retired
- d = Defaulted
- SR = Special ranking

First round
1	(Brazil) **L Mattar**	**6**	3	**3**
WC	(Brazil) J Oncins	1	**6**	0/r
(Australia) **P Doohan**	**6**	4	**6**
Q	(United States) J Sobel	1	**6**	4
(Argentina) F Yunis	4	5
(Sweden) **T Högstedt**	**6**	**7**
Q	(Brazil) **R Jabali**	**6**	1	**7**
8	(United States) T Wilkison	3	**6**	6
4	(Argentina) **E Bengoechea**	**6**	**6**
(Brazil) M Menezes	2	2
(Chile) **P Rebolledo**	**6**	**6**
(Chile) R Acuña	2	3
(Argentina) M Ingaramo	6	1
(Brazil) **I Kley**	**7**	**6**
WC	(Brazil) A Hocevar	2	**7**	2
5	(Brazil) **C Motta**	**6**	5	**6**
6	(Argentina) J Frana	5	5
WC	(Brazil) **M Hennemann**	**7**	**7**
(Brazil) D Marcelino	**6**	6	4
(Argentina) **G Rivas**	3	**7**	**6**
(Argentina) R Argüello	**6**	6	3
(Brazil) **F Roese**	1	**7**	**6**
(United States) K Kinnear	**7**	5	5
3	(Argentina) **M Jaite**	6	**7**	**7**
7	(United States) **T Witsken**	**7**	4	**7**
(United States) D Cassidy	5	**6**	5
Q	(Brazil) C Kist	3	4
(Switzerland) **C Mezzadri**	**6**	**6**
(West Germany) **P Baur**	**6**	**6**
(Mexico) J Lozano	3	4
Q	(Brazil) F Pinto	4	0
2	(Argentina) **H de la Peña**	**6**	**6**

Second round
1	(Brazil) **L Mattar**	**6**	**6**
(Australia) P Doohan	3	1
(Sweden) **T Högstedt**	**7**	**6**
Q	(Brazil) R Jabali	5	3
4	(Argentina) **E Bengoechea**	**6**	**6**
(Chile) P Rebolledo	2	2
(Brazil) I Kley	2	4
5	(Brazil) **C Motta**	**6**	**6**
WC	(Brazil) M Hennemann	3	4
(Argentina) **G Rivas**	**6**	**6**
(Brazil) F Roese	4	4
3	(Argentina) **M Jaite**	**6**	**6**
7	(United States) **T Witsken**	**6**	**6**
(Switzerland) C Mezzadri	4	3
(West Germany) P Baur	2	6
2	(Argentina) **H de la Peña**	**6**	**7**

Quarterfinals
1	(Brazil) **L Mattar**	**6**	**6**
(Sweden) T Högstedt	4	4
4	(Argentina) E Bengoechea	**7**	4	4
5	(Brazil) **C Motta**	5	**6**	**6**
(Argentina) G Rivas	1	3
3	(Argentina) **M Jaite**	**6**	**6**
7	(United States) **T Witsken**	**7**	**6**
2	(Argentina) H de la Peña	6	1

Semifinals
1	(Brazil) **L Mattar**	**6**	**6**
5	(Brazil) C Motta	4	3
3	(Argentina) **M Jaite**	4	**6**	**6**
7	(United States) T Witsken	**6**	4	4

Final
1	(Brazil) **Luiz Mattar**	**6**	5	**6**
3	(Argentina) Martín Jaite	4	**7**	4
