= 1990 Banespa Open – Singles =

Singles
- 1990 Banespa Open

Final
- Champion: (Brazil) Luiz Mattar
- Runner-up: (Canada) Andrew Sznajder
- Score: 6–4, 6–4

Details
- Draw: 32
- Seeds: 8

Events
Singles	Doubles
← 1989 ·	Banespa Open

Luiz Mattar was the defending champion, and retained his title defeating Andrew Sznajder 6–4, 6–4, in the final.

== Seeds ==
1. (Brazil) Luiz Mattar (champion)
2. (Canada) Andrew Sznajder (final)
3. (Brazil) Cássio Motta (second round)
4. (Argentina) Eduardo Bengoechea (first round)
5. (Canada) Martin Laurendeau (quarterfinals)
6. (Canada) Martin Wostenholme (semifinals)
7. (United States) Brad Pearce (second round)
8. (Argentina) Horacio de la Peña (first round)

== Draw ==
=== Key ===
- Q = Qualifier
- WC = Wild card
- LL = Lucky loser
- Alt = Alternate
- SE = Special exempt
- PR = Protected ranking
- ITF = ITF entry
- JE = Junior exempt
- w/o = Walkover
- r = Retired
- d = Defaulted
- SR = Special ranking

=== Finals ===
Semifinals
1	(Brazil) Luiz Mattar	6	6
6	(Canada) Martin Wostenholme	3	1
Q	(United States) Brian Garrow	4	6	4
2	(Canada) Andrew Sznajder	6	1	6

Final
1	(Brazil) Luiz Mattar	6	6
2	(Canada) Andrew Sznajder	4	4

=== Top half ===
First round
1	(Brazil) L Mattar	1	7	6
WC	(Brazil) J Oncins	6	5	1
(Argentina) R Argüello	6	6
Q	(Argentina) P Albano	3	0
(West Germany) P Vojtíšek	6	6^{5}	7
(Nigeria) N Odizor	3	7^{7}	5
(France) O Delaître	4	4
7	(United States) B Pearce	6	6
3	(Brazil) C Motta	6	6
(United States) D Cassidy	4	1
Q	(Argentina) M Ingaramo	4	5
(Italy) S Colombo	6	7
(Brazil) A Hocevar	1	7	4
(United Kingdom) N Brown	6	5	6
(West Germany) R Osterthun	6	5	4
6	(Canada) M Wostenholme	3	7	6

Second round
1	(Brazil) L Mattar	6	6
(Argentina) R Argüello	3	3
(West Germany) P Vojtíšek	6	5	6
7	(United States) B Pearce	3	7	1
3	(Brazil) C Motta	6^{6}	3
(Italy) S Colombo	7^{8}	6
(United Kingdom) N Brown	6^{1}	2
6	(Canada) M Wostenholme	7^{7}	6

Quarterfinals
1	(Brazil) L Mattar	4	6	6
(West Germany) P Vojtíšek	6	1	3
(Italy) S Colombo	2	2
6	(Canada) M Wostenholme	6	6

Semifinals
1	(Brazil) L Mattar	6	6
6	(Canada) M Wostenholme	3	1

=== Bottom half ===
First round
5	(Canada) M Laurendeau	6	3	7
(United States) B Shelton	2	6	5
(Mexico) L Lavalle	6	6^{5}	7^{9}
(Argentina) G Markus	4	7^{7}	6^{7}
WC	(Brazil) D Marcelino	3	1
(Canada) C Pridham	6	6
Q	(United States) B Garrow	6	4	6
4	(Argentina) E Bengoechea	0	6	3
8	(Argentina) H de la Peña	3	3
(West Germany) P Baur	6	6
(Italy) G Pozzi	6	7^{7}
Q	(Brazil) J Daher	2	6^{2}
(Brazil) F Roese	6	6
(West Germany) P Ballauff	2	1
WC	(Argentina) J Frana	3	1
2	(Canada) A Sznajder	6	6

Second round
5	(Canada) M Laurendeau	6	3	6
(Mexico) L Lavalle	1	6	2
(Canada) C Pridham	6	5	1
Q	(United States) B Garrow	2	7	6
(West Germany) P Baur	6	2	6
(Italy) G Pozzi	2	6	3
(Brazil) F Roese	3	3
2	(Canada) A Sznajder	6	6

Quarterfinals
5	(Canada) M Laurendeau	3	3
Q	(United States) B Garrow	6	6
(West Germany) P Baur	5	1
2	(Canada) A Sznajder	7	6

Semifinals
Q	(United States) B Garrow	4	6	4
2	(Canada) A Sznajder	6	1	6
