= 1993 Purex Tennis Championships =

- Date: February 22–28
- Edition: 6th
- Category: World Series
- Draw: 32S / 16D
- Prize money: $275,000
- Surface: Hard / outdoor
- Location: Scottsdale, Arizona, U.S.

Champions

Singles
- (United States) Andre Agassi

Doubles
- (United States) Mark Keil / (United States) Dave Randall
← 1992 ·	Tennis Channel Open	· 1994 →

The 1993 Purex Tennis Championships was an Association of Tennis Professionals men's tennis tournament held in Scottsdale, Arizona in the United States that was part of the World Series of the 1993 ATP Tour. It was the sixth edition of the tournament and was held from February 22 to February 28, 1993, Second-seeded Andre Agassi won the singles title and earned $39,600 first-prize money.

== Finals ==
=== Singles ===
(United States) Andre Agassi defeated (South Africa) Marcos Ondruska 6–2, 3–6, 6–3

- It was Agassi's 2nd singles title of the year and the 19th of his career.

=== Doubles ===
(United States) Mark Keil / (United States) Dave Randall defeated (United States) Luke Jensen / (Australia) Sandon Stolle 7–5, 6–4

- It was Keil's 1st title of the year and the 2nd of his career. It was Randall's only title of the year and the 2nd of his career.
