= 1992 Purex Tennis Championships – Singles =

Tennis tournament

Singles
- 1992 Tennis Channel Open

Final
- Champion: (Italy) Stefano Pescosolido
- Runner-up: (United States) Brad Gilbert
- Score: 6–0, 1–6, 6–4

Details
- Draw: 32
- Seeds: 8

Events
| Singles | Doubles |
| ← 1989 · | Tennis Channel Open | · 1993 → |

Stefano Pescosolido won the title, defeating Brad Gilbert 6–0, 1–6, 6–4 in the final.

== Seeds ==
1. (Spain) Emilio Sánchez (quarterfinals)
2. (United States) Andre Agassi (second round)
3. (United States) Derrick Rostagno (first round)
4. (Argentina) Alberto Mancini (quarterfinals)
5. (United States) MaliVai Washington (semifinals)
6. (Spain) Javier Sánchez (first round)
7. (United States) Brad Gilbert (final)
8. (Commonwealth of Independent States) Andrei Chesnokov (semifinals)

== Draw ==
=== Key ===
- Q = Qualifier
- WC = Wild card
- LL = Lucky loser
- Alt = Alternate
- SE = Special exempt
- PR = Protected ranking
- ITF = ITF entry
- JE = Junior exempt
- w/o = Walkover
- r = Retired
- d = Defaulted
- SR = Special ranking

=== Finals ===
Semifinals
7 | (United States) Brad Gilbert | 6 | 3 | 6
5 | (United States) MaliVai Washington | 3 | 6 | 2
(Italy) Stefano Pescosolido | 6^{5} | 6 | 6
8 | (Commonwealth of Independent States) Andrei Chesnokov | 7^{7} | 3 | 3

Final
7 | (United States) Brad Gilbert | 0 | 6 | 4
(Italy) Stefano Pescosolido | 6 | 1 | 6

=== Top half ===
First round
1 | (Spain) E Sánchez | 6 | 6
(Austria) H Skoff | 3 | 0
(Austria) T Muster | 1^{r}
(France) T Champion | 4
Q | (United States) G Layendecker | 6 | 6
WC | (United States) B Dunn | 1 | 3
(Germany) M Zoecke | 7^{7} | 6^{2} | 6^{4}
7 | (United States) B Gilbert | 6^{2} | 7^{7} | 7^{7}
4 | (Argentina) A Mancini | 5 | 6 | 6
WC | (Australia) W Masur | 7 | 4 | 4
(Argentina) G Markus | 6 | 7^{7}
(Argentina) J Frana | 3 | 6^{2}
(United States) J Connors | 5 | 6 | 3
(Peru) J Yzaga | 7 | 4 | 6
(Italy) R Furlan | 6^{4} | 3
5 | (United States) M Washington | 7^{7} | 6

Second round
1 | (Spain) E Sánchez | 6 | 6
(France) T Champion | 2 | 0
Q | (United States) G Layendecker | 2 | 2
7 | (United States) B Gilbert | 6 | 6
4 | (Argentina) A Mancini | 4 | 6 | 6
(Argentina) G Markus | 6 | 4 | 2
(Peru) J Yzaga | 4 | 3
5 | (United States) M Washington | 6 | 6

Quarterfinals
1 | (Spain) E Sánchez | 3 | 5
7 | (United States) B Gilbert | 6 | 7
4 | (Argentina) A Mancini | 3 | 4
5 | (United States) M Washington | 6 | 6

Semifinals
7 | (United States) B Gilbert | 6 | 3 | 6
5 | (United States) M Washington | 3 | 6 | 2

=== Bottom half ===
First round
6 | (Spain) J Sánchez | 3 | 6^{5}
(Italy) C Caratti | 6 | 7^{7}
(Brazil) J Oncins | 7 | 6
Q | (France) L Prades | 5 | 4
(Israel) A Mansdorf | 4 | 3
(Italy) S Pescosolido | 6 | 6
Q | (Venezuela) M Ruah | 7^{7} | 6
3 | (United States) D Rostagno | 6^{4} | 4
8 | (Commonwealth of Independent States) A Chesnokov | 4 | 6 | 6
(United States) B Shelton | 6 | 4 | 2
WC | (Romania) D Pescariu | 7^{7} | 2 | 6
(France) F Fontang | 6^{5} | 6 | 4
(Switzerland) M Rosset | 7^{7} | 6
Q | (United States) M Keil | 6^{4} | 4
(Spain) F Clavet | 2 | 1
2 | (United States) A Agassi | 6 | 6

Second round
(Italy) C Caratti | 6 | 6
(Brazil) J Oncins | 4 | 1
(Italy) S Pescosolido | 6 | 6
Q | (Venezuela) M Ruah | 3 | 4
8 | (Commonwealth of Independent States) A Chesnokov | 7 | 6
WC | (Romania) D Pescariu | 5 | 0
(Switzerland) M Rosset | 7 | 7^{7}
2 | (United States) A Agassi | 5 | 6^{5}

Quarterfinals
(Italy) C Caratti | 2 | 6^{2}
(Italy) S Pescosolido | 6 | 7^{7}
8 | (Commonwealth of Independent States) A Chesnokov | 7^{9} | 6
(Switzerland) M Rosset | 6^{7} | 4

Semifinals
(Italy) S Pescosolido | 6^{5} | 6 | 6
8 | (Commonwealth of Independent States) A Chesnokov | 7^{7} | 3 | 3
