= Rio de Janeiro Open =

Tennis tournament in Brazil

Defunct tennis tournament
- Tour: Grand Prix circuit
- Founded: 1989
- Abolished: 1990
- Editions: 2
- Location: Rio de Janeiro, Brazil
- Surface: Carpet / indoor

Current champions (1990)
- Men's singles: (Brazil) Luiz Mattar
- Men's doubles: (United States) Brian Garrow (United States) Sven Salumaa

The Rio de Janeiro Open (known as the Banespa Rio de Janeiro Open for sponsorship reasons) was a men's tennis tournament from 1989 to 1990 on indoor carpet courts.

== Finals ==
=== Singles ===
Year	Champions	Runners-up	Score
1989	(Brazil) Luiz Mattar	(Argentina) Martín Jaite	6–4, 5–7, 6–4
1990	(Brazil) Luiz Mattar	(Canada) Andrew Sznajder	6–4, 6–4

=== Doubles ===
Year	Champions	Runners-up	Score
1989	(Mexico) Jorge Lozano (United States) Todd Witsken	(United States) Patrick McEnroe (United States) Tim Wilkison	2–6, 6–4, 6–4
1990	(United States) Brian Garrow (United States) Sven Salumaa	(Brazil) Nelson Aerts (Brazil) Fernando Roese	7–5, 6–3

== See also ==
- Rio Open – men's ATP Tour tournament (since 2014)
