= 1991 GTE U.S. Men's Hard Court Championships – Doubles =

Doubles
- 1991 GTE U.S. Men's Hard Court Championships

Final
- Champions: (United States) Ken Flach (United States) Robert Seguso
- Runners-up: (United States) Kent Kinnear (United States) Sven Salumaa
- Score: 7–6, 6–4

Details
- Draw: 28 (2WC/2Q)
- Seeds: 8

Events
Singles	Doubles
- Indianapolis Tennis Championships

Scott Davis and David Pate were the defending champions, but lost in the semifinals to Kent Kinnear and Sven Salumaa.

Ken Flach and Robert Seguso won the title by defeating Kinnear and Salumaa 7–6, 6–4 in the final.

== Seeds ==
The first four seeds received a bye into the second round.

1. (Australia) John Fitzgerald / (Sweden) Anders Järryd (second round)
2. (United States) Scott Davis / (United States) David Pate (semifinals)
3. (Canada) Grant Connell / (Canada) Glenn Michibata (quarterfinals)
4. (United States) Patrick Galbraith / (United States) Todd Witsken (second round)
5. (South Africa) Gary Muller / (South Africa) Danie Visser (quarterfinals)
6. (France) Guy Forget / (Switzerland) Jakob Hlasek (first round)
7. (United States) Rick Leach / (United States) Jim Pugh (quarterfinals)
8. (South Africa) Wayne Ferreira / (South Africa) Piet Norval (first round)

== Draw ==
Key

- Q = Qualifier
- WC = Wild card
- LL = Lucky loser
- Alt = Alternate
- ITF = ITF entry
- PR = Protected ranking
- SR = Special ranking
- SE = Special exempt
- JE = Junior exempt
- JR = Junior Accelerator Programme entrant
- CO = College Accelerator Programme entrant
- NG = Next Gen Accelerator Program entrant
- w/o = Walkover
- r = Retired
- d = Defaulted

=== Finals ===
Semifinals
(United States) Ken Flach (United States) Robert Seguso	6	6
WC	(United States) Jared Palmer (United States) Jonathan Stark	3	3
(United States) Kent Kinnear (United States) Sven Salumaa	6	7
2	(United States) Scott Davis (United States) David Pate	3	5

Final
(United States) Ken Flach (United States) Robert Seguso	7	6
(United States) Kent Kinnear (United States) Sven Salumaa	6	4

=== Top half ===
First round
(United States) K Flach (United States) R Seguso	4	7	6
(Iran) M Bahrami (France) R Gilbert	6	6	1
(United States) B Pearce (Australia) J Stoltenberg	6	4
(Spain) E Sánchez (Socialist Federal Republic of Yugoslavia) S Živojinović	7	6
WC	(Russia) A Cherkasov (Russia) A Volkov	7	3	2
7	(United States) R Leach (United States) J Pugh	6	6	6
(Italy) S Pescosolido (Spain) J Sánchez	3	2
(Spain) T Carbonell (New Zealand) K Evernden	6	6
(United States) P McEnroe (United States) D Wheaton	7	7
(United Kingdom) J Bates (United States) K Curren	6	6
WC	(United States) J Palmer (United States) J Stark	7	4	7
6	(France) G Forget (Switzerland) J Hlasek	5	6	6

Second round
1	(Australia) J Fitzgerald (Sweden) A Järryd	7	4	2
(United States) K Flach (United States) R Seguso	6	6	6
(Spain) E Sánchez (Socialist Federal Republic of Yugoslavia) S Živojinović	2	6
7	(United States) R Leach (United States) J Pugh	6	7
3	(Canada) G Connell (Canada) G Michibata	7	7
(Spain) T Carbonell (New Zealand) K Evernden	6	6
(United States) P McEnroe (United States) D Wheaton	4	3
WC	(United States) J Palmer (United States) J Stark	6	6

Quarterfinals
(United States) K Flach (United States) R Seguso	6	6	7
7	(United States) R Leach (United States) J Pugh	1	7	5
3	(Canada) G Connell (Canada) G Michibata	4	4
WC	(United States) J Palmer (United States) J Stark	6	6

Semifinals
(United States) K Flach (United States) R Seguso	6	6
WC	(United States) J Palmer (United States) J Stark	3	3

=== Bottom half ===
First round
5	(South Africa) G Muller (South Africa) D Visser	7	6
(South Africa) R Deppe (New Zealand) B Steven	6	4
Q	(South Africa) M Ondruska (South Africa) G Stafford	6	6
Q	(United States) Ian Aler (United States) K Evans	3	4
(Sweden) T Svantesson (United States) G Van Emburgh	6	4
(United States) K Kinnear (United States) S Salumaa	7	6
8	(South Africa) W Ferreira (South Africa) P Norval	3	6
(Germany) B Becker (Czechoslovakia) T Šmíd	6	7
(United Kingdom) N Broad (South Africa) S Kruger	6	7
(United States) J Canter (Spain) F Clavet	1	6
(Australia) N Borwick (United States) K Thorne	6	7
(Australia) B Dyke (Sweden) P Lundgren	3	6

Second round
5	(South Africa) G Muller (South Africa) D Visser	6	7
Q	(South Africa) M Ondruska (South Africa) G Stafford	2	6
(United States) K Kinnear (United States) S Salumaa	6	3	6
4	(United States) P Galbraith (United States) T Witsken	3	6	2
(Germany) B Becker (Czechoslovakia) T Šmíd	6	6
(United Kingdom) N Broad (South Africa) S Kruger	4	4
(Australia) N Borwick (United States) K Thorne	7	3	1
2	(United States) S Davis (United States) D Pate	6	6	6

Quarterfinals
5	(South Africa) G Muller (South Africa) D Visser	4	3
(United States) K Kinnear (United States) S Salumaa	6	6
(Germany) B Becker (Czechoslovakia) T Šmíd	7	6	6
2	(United States) S Davis (United States) D Pate	6	7	7

Semifinals
(United States) K Kinnear (United States) S Salumaa	6	7
2	(United States) S Davis (United States) D Pate	3	5
