= 1992 Purex Tennis Championships – Doubles =

Tennis tournament

Doubles
- 1992 Tennis Channel Open

Final
- Champions: (United States) Mark Keil (United States) Dave Randall
- Runners-up: (United States) Kent Kinnear (United States) Sven Salumaa
- Score: 4–6, 6–1, 6–2

Details
- Draw: 16
- Seeds: 4

Events
Singles	Doubles
- Tennis Channel Open

The event was held for the first time since 1989, when Rick Leach and Jim Pugh won the title. Neither player participated this year.

Mark Keil and Dave Randall won the title, defeating Kent Kinnear and Sven Salumaa 4–6, 6–1, 6–2 in the final.

== Seeds ==
1. (United States) Ken Flach / (United States) Robert Seguso (first round)
2. (Spain) Sergio Casal / (Spain) Emilio Sánchez (quarterfinals)
3. (Argentina) Javier Frana / (Mexico) Leonardo Lavalle (semifinals)
4. (South Africa) Stefan Kruger / (South Africa) Piet Norval (quarterfinals)

== Draw ==
Key

- Q = Qualifier
- WC = Wild card
- LL = Lucky loser
- Alt = Alternate
- ITF = ITF entry
- PR = Protected ranking
- SR = Special ranking
- SE = Special exempt
- JE = Junior exempt
- JR = Junior Accelerator Programme entrant
- CO = College Accelerator Programme entrant
- NG = Next Gen Accelerator Program entrant
- w/o = Walkover
- r = Retired
- d = Defaulted

=== Draw ===
First round
1	(United States) K Flach (United States) R Seguso	3	7	5
(Switzerland) M Rosset (Spain) J Sánchez	6	6	7
(United States) B Pearce (South Africa) B Talbot	7	4	4
(United States) M Keil (United States) D Randall	6	6	6
4	(South Africa) S Kruger (South Africa) P Norval	6	2	7
(United States) P Annacone (Australia) L Warder	3	6	5
(United States) P Galbraith (United States) G Layendecker	6	3	6
(United States) B Shelton (United States) M Washington	2	6	7
(Brazil) R Acioly (Brazil) J Oncins	6	3	4
Q	(Puerto Rico) M Nido (Venezuela) M Ruah	3	6	6
(Australia) M Kratzmann (Australia) W Masur	4	6
3	(Argentina) J Frana (Mexico) L Lavalle	6	7
(United States) B Garnett (Sweden) T Svantesson	6	5	6
(United States) K Kinnear (United States) S Salumaa	0	7	7
(Argentina) P Albano (United States) T Nelson	3	6	3
2	(Spain) S Casal (Spain) E Sánchez	6	3	6

Quarterfinals
(Switzerland) M Rosset (Spain) J Sánchez	5	7	5
(United States) M Keil (United States) D Randall	7	6	7
4	(South Africa) S Kruger (South Africa) P Norval	3	6	1
(United States) B Shelton (United States) M Washington	6	3	6
Q	(Puerto Rico) M Nido (Venezuela) M Ruah	4	4
3	(Argentina) J Frana (Mexico) L Lavalle	6	6
(United States) K Kinnear (United States) S Salumaa	3	7	6
2	(Spain) S Casal (Spain) E Sánchez	6	6	4

Semifinals
(United States) M Keil (United States) D Randall	6	6
(United States) B Shelton (United States) M Washington	4	2
3	(Argentina) J Frana (Mexico) L Lavalle	6	6
(United States) K Kinnear (United States) S Salumaa	7	7

Final
(United States) M Keil (United States) D Randall	4	6	6
(United States) K Kinnear (United States) S Salumaa	6	1	2
