= 1993 Purex Tennis Championships – Singles =

Tennis tournament

Singles
- 1993 Tennis Channel Open

Final
- Champion: (United States) Andre Agassi
- Runner-up: (South Africa) Marcos Ondruska
- Score: 6–2, 3–6, 6–3

Details
- Draw: 32
- Seeds: 8

Events
Singles	Doubles
← 1992 ·	Tennis Channel Open	· 1994 →

Stefano Pescosolido was the defending champion, but lost in the first round this year.

Andre Agassi won the title, defeating Marcos Ondruska 6–2, 3–6, 6–3 in the final.

== Seeds ==
1. n/a
2. (United States) Andre Agassi (champion)
3. (United States) MaliVai Washington (quarterfinals)
4. (Spain) Francisco Clavet (first round)
5. (United States) Brad Gilbert (quarterfinals)
6. (France) Fabrice Santoro (first round)
7. (Spain) Emilio Sánchez (quarterfinals)
8. (Russia) Andrei Chesnokov (semifinals)

== Draw ==
=== Key ===
- Q = Qualifier
- WC = Wild card
- LL = Lucky loser
- Alt = Alternate
- ITF = ITF entry
- PR = Protected ranking
- SR = Special ranking
- SE = Special exempt
- JE = Junior exempt
- JR = Junior Accelerator Programme entrant
- CO = College Accelerator Programme entrant
- NG = Next Gen Accelerator Program entrant
- w/o = Walkover
- r = Retired
- d = Defaulted

=== Finals ===
Semifinals
8	(Russia) Andrei Chesnokov	4	5
(South Africa) Marcos Ondruska	6	7
(Australia) Mark Woodforde	2	3
2	(United States) Andre Agassi	6	6

Final
(South Africa) Marcos Ondruska	2	6	3
2	(United States) Andre Agassi	6	3	6

=== Top half ===
First round
LL	(Spain) JLT Rascón	5	3
(Sweden) T Enqvist	7	6
(United States) D Rostagno	5	6	6
(Italy) S Pescosolido	7	2	2
Q	(South Africa) C van Rensburg	6	2	5
(Peru) J Yzaga	1	6	7
Q	(United States) D Pate	3	6	4
8	(Russia) A Chesnokov	6	3	6
4	(Spain) F Clavet	3	4
(South Africa) M Ondruska	6	6
(United States) J Connors	3	3
WC	(United States) D Wheaton	6	6
WC	(United States) A O'Brien	7^{7}	1
(Australia) T Woodbridge	6^{4}	0^{r}
(Italy) R Furlan	3	6^{5}
5	(United States) B Gilbert	6	7^{7}

Second round
(Sweden) T Enqvist	1	4
(United States) D Rostagno	6	6
(Peru) J Yzaga	4	2
8	(Russia) A Chesnokov	6	6
(South Africa) M Ondruska	7	6
WC	(United States) D Wheaton	5	3
WC	(United States) A O'Brien	6	5	3
5	(United States) B Gilbert	1	7	6

Quarterfinals
(United States) D Rostagno	2	6^{5}
8	(Russia) A Chesnokov	6	7^{7}
(South Africa) M Ondruska	7	6
5	(United States) B Gilbert	5	2

Semifinals
8	(Russia) A Chesnokov	4	5
(South Africa) M Ondruska	6	7

=== Bottom half ===
First round
6	(France) F Santoro	3	5
(Brazil) L Mattar	6	7
(Spain) T Carbonell	6	4	1
(Australia) M Woodforde	3	6	6
(United States) R Reneberg	3	2^{r}
(Uruguay) M Filippini	6	3
Q	(United States) D Flach	3	6^{3}
3	(United States) M Washington	6	7^{7}
7	(Spain) E Sánchez	6	6
WC	(United States) B MacPhie	2	3
(Germany) B Karbacher	5	7^{7}	3
(Argentina) G Markus	7	6^{4}	6
Q	(United States) K Evans	6	5	6
(Argentina) A Mancini	3	7	4
(Australia) S Stolle	0	0
2	(United States) A Agassi	6	6

Second round
(Brazil) L Mattar	3	3
(Australia) M Woodforde	6	6
(Uruguay) M Filippini	2	6	3
3	(United States) M Washington	6	3	6
7	(Spain) E Sánchez	7^{7}	7^{14}
(Argentina) G Markus	6^{1}	6^{12}
Q	(United States) K Evans	1	3
2	(United States) A Agassi	6	6

Quarterfinals
(Australia) M Woodforde	4	7^{7}	6
3	(United States) M Washington	6	6^{5}	3
7	(Spain) E Sánchez	1	1
2	(United States) A Agassi	6	6

Semifinals
(Australia) M Woodforde	2	3
2	(United States) A Agassi	6	6
