= 1990 GTE U.S. Men's Hard Court Championships =

- Date: August 13–19
- Edition: 3rd
- Category: Championship Series
- Draw: 56S / 28D
- Prize money: $825,000
- Surface: Hard / outdoor
- Location: Indianapolis, IN, U.S.
- Venue: Indianapolis Tennis Center

Champions

Singles
- (West Germany) Boris Becker

Doubles
- (United States) Scott Davis / (United States) David Pate
← 1989 ·	Indianapolis Tennis Championships	· 1991 →

The 1990 GTE U.S. Men's Hard Court Championships was a men's tennis tournament played on outdoor hard courts at the Indianapolis Tennis Center in Indianapolis, Indiana in the United States that was part of the Championship Series of the 1990 ATP Tour. It was the third edition of the tournament and was held from August 13 through August 19, 1990. First-seeded Boris Becker won the singles title.

== Finals ==
=== Singles ===
(Germany) Boris Becker defeated (Sweden) Peter Lundgren 6–3, 6–4

- It was Becker's 3rd title of the year and the 27th of his career.

=== Doubles ===
(United States) Scott Davis / (United States) David Pate defeated (Canada) Grant Connell / (Canada) Glenn Michibata 7–6, 7–6

- It was Davis' 4th title of the year and the 14th of his career. It was Pate's 4th title of the year and the 13th of his career.
