= 1989 Banespa Open – Doubles =

Doubles
- 1989 Banespa Open

Final
- Champions: (Mexico) Jorge Lozano (United States) Todd Witsken
- Runners-up: (United States) Patrick McEnroe (United States) Tim Wilkison
- Score: 2–6, 6–4, 6–4

Details
- Draw: 16
- Seeds: 4

Events
| Singles | Doubles |
- Banespa Open

Jorge Lozano and Todd Witsken won in the final 2–6, 6–4, 6–4 against Patrick McEnroe and Tim Wilkison.

== Seeds ==
Champion seeds are indicated in bold text while text in italics indicates the round in which those seeds were eliminated.

1. (Mexico) **Jorge Lozano** / (United States) **Todd Witsken (champions)**
2. (United States) Patrick McEnroe / (United States) Tim Wilkison (final)
3. (Brazil) Ricardo Acioly / (Brazil) Dacio Campos (semifinals)
4. (Brazil) Danilo Marcelino / (Brazil) Mauro Menezes (first round)

== Draw ==
Key

- Q = Qualifier
- WC = Wild card
- LL = Lucky loser
- Alt = Alternate
- ITF = ITF entry
- PR = Protected ranking
- SR = Special ranking
- SE = Special exempt
- JE = Junior exempt
- JR = Junior Accelerator Programme entrant
- CO = College Accelerator Programme entrant
- NG = Next Gen Accelerator Program entrant
- w/o = Walkover
- r = Retired
- d = Defaulted

First round
1 | (Mexico) **J Lozano** (United States) **T Witsken** | **6** | **6**
(Chile) P Rebolledo (United States) J Sobel | 1 | 2
(Argentina) **M Ingaramo** (Brazil) **C Kist** | **6** | **7**
(Brazil) M Hennemann (Brazil) E Oliveira | 1 | 6
3 | (Brazil) **R Acioly** (Brazil) **D Campos** | 4 | **6** | **6**
(Argentina) E Bengoechea (Switzerland) C Mezzadri | **6** | 3 | 3
(West Germany) P Baur (United States) N Caswell | **6** | 6 | 6
(Brazil) **R Jabali** (Brazil) **J Zwetsch** | 1 | **7** | **7**
(Argentina) **J Frana** (Argentina) **M Jaite** | **7** | **6**
(Brazil) I Kley (Brazil) F Roese | 6 | 4
(Brazil) **L Mattar** (Brazil) **C Motta** | **6** | **6**
4 | (Brazil) D Marcelino (Brazil) M Menezes | 2 | 4
(United States) **J Klaparda** (Canada) **M Laurendeau** | **7** | **6**
(Brazil) A Hocevar (Brazil) M Hocevar | 6 | 4
(Brazil) G Barbosa (Brazil) R Camargo | 4 | 1
2 | (United States) **P McEnroe** (United States) **T Wilkison** | **6** | **6**

Quarterfinals
1 | (Mexico) **J Lozano** (United States) **T Witsken** | **6** | **7**
(Argentina) M Ingaramo (Brazil) C Kist | 2 | 5
3 | (Brazil) **R Acioly** (Brazil) **D Campos** | 4 | **6** | **6**
(Brazil) R Jabali (Brazil) J Zwetsch | **6** | 3 | 2
(Argentina) J Frana (Argentina) M Jaite | 6 | 6
(Brazil) **L Mattar** (Brazil) **C Motta** | **7** | **7**
(United States) J Klaparda (Canada) M Laurendeau | 4 | 1
2 | (United States) **P McEnroe** (United States) **T Wilkison** | **6** | **6**

Semifinals
1 | (Mexico) **J Lozano** (United States) **T Witsken** | **6** | 3 | **6**
3 | (Brazil) R Acioly (Brazil) D Campos | 4 | **6** | 1
(Brazil) L Mattar (Brazil) C Motta | 2 | 5
2 | (United States) **P McEnroe** (United States) **T Wilkison** | **6** | **7**

Final
1 | (Mexico) **Jorge Lozano** (United States) **Todd Witsken** | 2 | **6** | **6**
2 | (United States) Patrick McEnroe (United States) Tim Wilkison | **6** | 4 | 4
