= 1988 GTE U.S. Men's Hard Court Championships =

- Date: August 1–7
- Edition: 1st
- Category: Grand Prix
- Draw: 56S / 28D
- Prize money: $297,500
- Surface: Hard / outdoor
- Location: Indianapolis, IN, U.S.
- Venue: Indianapolis Tennis Center

Champions

Singles
- (West Germany) Boris Becker

Doubles
- (United States) Rick Leach / (United States) Jim Pugh
Indianapolis Tennis Championships	· 1989 →

The 1988 GTE U.S. Men's Hard Court Championships was a men's tennis tournament played on outdoor hard courts at the Indianapolis Tennis Center in Indianapolis, Indiana in the United States that was part of the 1988 Nabisco Grand Prix. It was the inaugural edition of the tournament and was held from August 1 through August 7, 1988. First-seeded Boris Becker won the singles title.

== Finals ==
=== Singles ===
(West Germany) Boris Becker defeated (United States) John McEnroe 6–4, 6–2

- It was Becker's 4th singles title of the year and the 16th of his career.

=== Doubles ===
(United States) Rick Leach / (United States) Jim Pugh defeated (United States) Ken Flach / (United States) Robert Seguso 4–6, 6–3, 6–4

- It was Leach's 5th doubles title of the year and the 7th of his career. It was Pugh's 4th doubles title of the year and the 7th of his career.
