= 1989 GTE U.S. Men's Hard Court Championships =

- Date: August 7–13
- Edition: 2nd
- Category: Grand Prix
- Draw: 56S / 28D
- Prize money: $300,000
- Surface: Hard / outdoor
- Location: Indianapolis, IN, U.S.
- Venue: Indianapolis Tennis Center

Champions

Singles
- (United States) John McEnroe

Doubles
- (South Africa) Pieter Aldrich / (South Africa) Danie Visser
- Indianapolis Tennis Championships

The 1989 GTE U.S. Men's Hard Court Championships was a men's tennis tournament played on outdoor hard courts at the Indianapolis Tennis Center in Indianapolis, Indiana in the United States that was part of the 1989 Nabisco Grand Prix. It was the second edition of the tournament and was held from August 7 through August 13, 1989. Second-seeded John McEnroe won the singles title.

== Finals ==
=== Singles ===
(United States) John McEnroe defeated (United States) Jay Berger 6–4, 4–6, 6–4

- It was McEnroe's 3rd singles title of the year and the 75th of his career.

=== Doubles ===
(South Africa) Pieter Aldrich / (South Africa) Danie Visser defeated (Australia) Peter Doohan / (Australia) Laurie Warder 7–6, 7–6

- It was Aldrich's 1st title of the year and the 2nd of his career. It was Visser's 1st title of the year and the 4th of his career.
