= Dave Randall =

American tennis player

- Country (sports): United States
- Born: May 8, 1967 (age 59) Memphis, Tennessee, U.S.
- Height: 6 ft 0 in (183 cm)
- Plays: Right-handed
- Prize money: $635,374

Singles
- Career record: 10–12
- Highest ranking: No. 155 (July 12, 1993)

Grand Slam singles results
- Australian Open: 1R (1993)
- Wimbledon: 2R (1993)

Doubles
- Career record: 153–168
- Career titles: 3
- Highest ranking: No. 39 (February 7, 1994)

Grand Slam doubles results
- Australian Open: 2R (1993, 1994, 1998)
- French Open: 2R (1992, 1993, 1994)
- Wimbledon: 2R (1993, 1997)
- US Open: QF (1993)

Dave Randall (born May 8, 1967) is a former professional tennis player from the United States.

Randall enjoyed most of his tennis success while playing doubles. During his career, he won three doubles titles. He achieved a career-high doubles ranking of World No. 39 in 1994.

== Career finals ==
=== Doubles (3 wins, 8 losses) ===
Result	W/L	Date	Tournament	Surface	Partner	Opponents	Score
Win	1–0	Feb 1992	Scottsdale, U.S.	Hard	(United States) Mark Keil	(United States) Kent Kinnear (United States) Sven Salumaa	4–6, 6–1, 6–2
Loss	1–1	Apr 1992	Atlanta, U.S.	Clay	(United States) Mark Keil	(United States) Steve DeVries (Australia) David Macpherson	3–6, 3–6
Win	2–1	Feb 1993	Scottsdale, U.S.	Hard	(United States) Mark Keil	(United States) Luke Jensen (Australia) Sandon Stolle	7–5, 6–4
Loss	2–2	Sep 1993	Basel, Switzerland	Hard (i)	(United States) Brad Pearce	(Zimbabwe) Byron Black (United States) Jonathan Stark	6–3, 5–7, 3–6
Loss	2–3	Oct 1995	Toulouse, France	Hard (i)	(United States) Greg Van Emburgh	(Sweden) Jonas Björkman (South Africa) John-Laffnie de Jager	6–7, 6–7
Loss	2–4.	Jan 1996	Jakarta, Indonesia	Hard	(United States) Kent Kinnear	(United States) Rick Leach (United States) Scott Melville	1–6, 6–2, 1–6
Loss	2–5	Apr 1996	Hong Kong	Hard	(United States) Kent Kinnear	(United States) Patrick Galbraith (Russia) Andrei Olhovskiy	3–6, 7–6, 6–7
Win	3–5	May 1997	Coral Springs, U.S.	Clay	(United States) Greg Van Emburgh	(United States) Luke Jensen (United States) Murphy Jensen	6–7^{(2–7)}, 6–2, 7–6^{(7–2)}
Loss	3–6	Jun 1997	Bologna, Italy	Clay	(United States) Jack Waite	(Brazil) Gustavo Kuerten (Brazil) Fernando Meligeni	2–6, 5–7
Loss	3–7	Aug 1997	Boston, U.S.	Hard	(United States) Jack Waite	(Netherlands) Jacco Eltingh (Netherlands) Paul Haarhuis	4–6, 2–6
Loss	3–8	Aug 1998	Long Island, U.S.	Hard	(United States) Brandon Coupe	(Spain) Julian Alonso (Spain) Javier Sánchez	4–6, 4–6
