= Andrew Sznajder =

Canadian tennis player (born 1967)

- Country (sports): Canada
- Born: 25 May 1967 (age 58) Preston, England
- Height: 1.75 m (5 ft 9 in)
- Turned pro: 1988
- Plays: Right-handed
- College: Pepperdine University
- Prize money: $419,995

Singles
- Career record: 58–74
- Career titles: 0; 1 Challenger, 0 Futures
- Highest ranking: No. 46 (25 September 1989)

Grand Slam singles results
- Australian Open: 2R (1990)
- French Open: 2R (1989, 1990)
- Wimbledon: Q3 (1993)
- US Open: 2R (1989)

Other tournaments
- Olympic Games: 2R (1992)

Doubles
- Career record: 7–18
- Career titles: 0; 1 Challenger, 0 Futures
- Highest ranking: No. 182 (29 July 1991)

Team competitions
- Davis Cup: SF (1992)
- Last updated on: 20 October 2021.

Andrew Sznajder (pronounced: shnigh-der) (born 25 May 1967) is a Canadian former professional tour tennis player.

Sznajder achieved a career-high singles ranking of World No. 46 in September 1989. This was the highest any Canadian male was ranked in singles by the ATP until Greg Rusedski made it to No. 41 (before becoming a British citizen; subsequently in February 2011, Milos Raonic reached World No. 37). He was inducted into the Canada Tennis Hall of Fame.

== Early life ==
Sznajder was born in Preston, Lancashire, England, moved to Canada at age seven, and is Jewish. He lives in Oakville, Ontario.

== Tennis career ==
He was named Tennis Canada's "Most Improved Player" in 1985, and "Male Player of the Year" in 1986. Over his career, he was a five-time Canada national champion. Sznajder was a record six-time winner of the Canadian Closed singles championship and three-time Tennis Canada singles Player of the Year.

Prior to his pro career, Sznajder played college tennis at Pepperdine University for the Pepperdine Waves, and was a two-time All-American selection (1987 and 1988; he was # 3 in college rankings both years). His .800 won-lost percentage there (40–10) is the 6th-best in the school's history. In 1988, he won the Intercollegiate Tennis Association indoor individual championship. He turned pro in his second year.

The summer of 1989 was his best season as a pro – he won the Chicoutimi challenger event, reached the 3rd round at both the Stratton Mountain and Indianapolis Grand Prix events, the quarter-finals of the Canadian Open and Los Angeles Grand Prix tournament, and the 2nd round of the U.S. Open. In July 1989 he defeated world # 24 Jay Berger in Stratton Mountain, 6–2, 2–6, 6–3, in August he beat # 23 Kevin Curren in Montreal, 6–2, 2–6, 6–3, and in September he upset # 8 Tim Mayotte in Los Angeles, 6–4, 3–6, 7–5.

In April 1990, Sznajder was a finalist of the Rio de Janeiro Grand Prix event. In November he upset world # 35 Karel Nováček 6–4, 6–3, in Brazil.

Upon retiring from the tour, Sznajder worked as Product Manager at PageNet Canada Inc. for 10 years. He then founded his own tennis health and racquet club software company, and directs his own tennis academy ASTA, and GSM Tennis Club, in Kitchener, Ontario.

He continued to play competitively, and captured the 2002 Ontario Indoor Championship.

After retiring, Sznajder became a top-ranking competitor on the ITF sanctioned Wilson/Mayfair Senior Circuit Over-35s.

In 2002 he was inducted into the Canada Tennis Hall of Fame.

=== Olympics ===
Sznajder represented Canada at the 1992 Summer Olympics, reaching the 2nd round.

=== Davis Cup ===
As a Canada Davis Cup team competitor, he had a career win-lose record of 14–10, all in singles, including a win and a loss in a losing tie to Spain in the first round of the 1991 World Group. It was Canada's first appearance in the World Group.

== ATP career finals ==
=== Singles: 1 (1 runner-up) ===
Legend Grand Slam tournaments (0–0) ATP World Tour Finals (0–0) ATP Masters Series (0–0) ATP Championship Series (0–0) ATP World Series (0–1)	Titles by surface Hard (0–0) Clay (0–0) Grass (0–0) Carpet (0–1)	Titles by setting Outdoor (0–0) Indoor (0–1)

Result	W–L	Date	Tournament	Tier	Surface	Opponent	Score
Loss	0–1	Apr 1990	Rio de Janeiro, Brazil	World Series	Carpet	(Brazil) Luiz Mattar	4–6, 4–6

== ATP Challenger and ITF Futures finals ==
=== Singles: 4 (1–3) ===
Legend ATP Challenger (1–3) ITF Futures (0–0)	Finals by surface Hard (0–2) Clay (1–1) Grass (0–0) Carpet (0–0)

Result	W–L	Date	Tournament	Tier	Surface	Opponent	Score
Win	1–0	Jul 1989	Chicoutimi, Canada	Challenger	Clay	(Germany) Karsten Braasch	7–6, 1–6, 6–1
Loss	1–1	Sep 1992	Bogotá, Colombia	Challenger	Clay	(Spain) Daniel Marco	6–7, 6–3, 4–6
Loss	1–2	Oct 1992	Ixtapa, Mexico	Challenger	Hard	(Mexico) Luis Herrera	1–6, 2–6
Loss	1–3	Oct 1992	Caracas, Venezuela	Challenger	Hard	(Czech Republic) Daniel Vacek	6–7, 4–6

=== Doubles: 1 (1–0) ===
Legend ATP Challenger (1–0) ITF Futures (0–0)	Finals by surface Hard (0–0) Clay (0–0) Grass (0–0) Carpet (1–0)

Result	W–L	Date	Tournament	Tier	Surface	Partner	Opponents	Score
Win	1–0	Aug 1990	Brasília, Brazil	Challenger	Carpet	(Brazil) Jaime Oncins	(Brazil) Luiz Mattar (Brazil) Fernando Roese	7–5, 3–6, 7–6

== Performance timeline ==
Key
W	F	SF	QF	#R	RR	Q#	DNQ	A	NH

(W) winner; (F) finalist; (SF) semifinalist; (QF) quarterfinalist; (#R) rounds 4, 3, 2, 1; (RR) round-robin stage; (Q#) qualification round; (DNQ) did not qualify; (A) absent; (NH) not held; (SR) strike rate (events won / competed); (W–L) win–loss record.

=== Singles ===
Tournament	1986	1987	1988	1989	1990	1991	1992	1993	1994	1995	SR	W–L	Win %
Grand Slam tournaments
Australian Open	A	A	A	A	2R	1R	Q1	A	Q1	A	0 / 2	1–2	33%
French Open	A	A	A	2R	2R	1R	A	A	A	Q1	0 / 3	2–3	40%
Wimbledon	A	A	A	A	A	A	A	Q3	A	A	0 / 0	0–0	–
US Open	A	1R	A	2R	1R	A	1R	Q3	Q3	Q3	0 / 4	1–4	20%
Win–loss	0–0	0–1	0–0	2–2	2–3	0–2	0–1	0–0	0–0	0–0	0 / 9	4–9	31%
ATP Masters Series
Indian Wells	A	A	A	A	A	A	A	Q1	Q3	A	0 / 0	0–0	–
Miami	A	A	A	3R	1R	1R	A	A	Q1	A	0 / 3	2–3	40%
Rome	A	A	A	A	1R	A	A	A	A	A	0 / 1	0–1	0%
Canada	1R	3R	2R	QF	3R	1R	1R	1R	A	1R	0 / 9	8–9	47%
Cincinnati	A	A	A	A	3R	A	A	A	Q2	A	0 / 1	2–1	67%
Win–loss	0–1	2–1	1–1	5–2	4–4	0–2	0–1	0–1	0–0	0–1	0 / 14	12–14	46%

== See also ==
- List of select Jewish tennis players
