= Banespa Open =

Banespa Open was a commercial name of several men's tennis tournaments in Brazil in late 1980s and early 1990s. It may refer to:

- Rio de Janeiro Open, from 1989 to 1990
- ATP São Paulo, from 1991 to 1993
