= Sven Salumaa =

American tennis player

- Country (sports): United States
- Born: October 21, 1966 (age 59) Huntington, New York, US
- Height: 6 ft 5 in (1.96 m)
- Turned pro: 1989
- Plays: Right-handed
- Prize money: $236,003

Singles
- Career record: 0–2
- Career titles: 0
- Highest ranking: No. 516 (April 16, 1990)

Doubles
- Career record: 71–82
- Career titles: 1
- Highest ranking: No. 25 (April 13, 1992)

Grand Slam doubles results
- Australian Open: 3R (1991, 1993)
- French Open: 2R (1992)
- Wimbledon: 3R (1992)
- US Open: SF (1990)

Mixed doubles
- Career titles: 0

Grand Slam mixed doubles results
- Australian Open: 2R (1992)
- French Open: 3R (1992)
- Wimbledon: 3R (1991)
- US Open: 2R (1991)

Sven Salumaa (born October 21, 1966) is a former professional tour tennis player who mostly played tour tennis in doubles.

== Tour career ==
Salumaa was born in Huntington, New York to Eduard and Tamara Salumaa who were immigrants from Estonia.

During Salumaa's tennis career he won one doubles title and achieved a career-high doubles ranking of world No. 25 in 1992. In 1990, he made the semi-finals in doubles at the US Open (tennis) with Brian Garrow, losing in five sets to the eventual champions, Pieter Aldrich and Danie Visser.

== College tennis ==
At Indiana University, Sven made the All-Big Ten tennis team in 1986, 1987 and 1988 and holds the all-time career singles wins record at 108. He graduated in 1989 with a Bachelor of Science in Business.

== Post tennis career ==
Salumaa continued his education in 1998, and graduated summa cum laude with a Master of Business Administration (MBA) from California State University, San Bernardino.

After retiring, Salumaa opened up a music recording studio in Bloomington, Indiana where he went to college at Indiana University before his professional tennis career. There he recorded local bands such as Hipmotize and the debut album of Big Bob's Farm.

In 2007, he worked with the New Hampshire theatre company, Shakespeare in the Valley along with Leila Birch, who played Teresa DiMarco in the BBC series, EastEnders. In 2008, he appeared in the West Coast premiere of Yank! A New Musical at Diversionary Theatre. Salumaa also appeared in the world premiere of the Patricia Loughrey and Rayme Sciaroni musical The Daddy Machine at Diversionary Theatre. In 2010, the musical Actions Most Ridiculous had a sold-out world premiere at the Coronado Playhouse where he was on the Board of Directors. Salumaa wrote all the music and lyrics, and co-wrote the book with Marianne Regan.

Salumaa has appeared in several short films, including Golden Hill, Duke's Day and B-Roll.

== Career finals ==
=== Doubles (1 title, 6 runner-ups) ===
Result	W/L	Date	Tournament	Surface	Partner	Opponents	Score
Win	1–0	Apr 1990	Rio de Janeiro, Brazil	Carpet	(United States) Brian Garrow	(Brazil) Nelson Aerts (Brazil) Fernando Roese	7–5, 6–3
Loss	1–1	Aug 1990	Schenectady, U.S.	Hard	(United States) Brian Garrow	(Australia) Richard Fromberg (United States) Brad Pearce	2–6, 6–3, 6–7
Loss	1–2	Apr 1991	Seoul, South Korea	Hard	(United States) Kent Kinnear	(Austria) Alex Antonitsch (Israel) Gilad Bloom	6–7, 1–6
Loss	1–3	Aug 1991	Indianapolis, U.S.	Hard	(United States) Kent Kinnear	(United States) Ken Flach (United States) Robert Seguso	6–7, 4–6
Loss	1–4	Mar 1992	Scottsdale, U.S.	Hard	(United States) Kent Kinnear	(United States) Mark Keil (United States) Dave Randall	6–4, 1–6, 2–6
Loss	1–5	Mar 1992	Indian Wells, U.S.	Hard	(United States) Kent Kinnear	(United States) Steve DeVries (Australia) David Macpherson	6–4, 3–6, 3–6
Loss	1–6	Mar 1992	Miami, U.S.	Hard	(United States) Kent Kinnear	(United States) Ken Flach (United States) Todd Witsken	4–6, 3–6
