= Brian Garrow =

American tennis player

- Country (sports): United States
- Born: April 8, 1968 (age 57); Santa Clara, CA, United States
- Height: 5 ft 8 in (1.73 m)
- Turned pro: 1988
- Retired: 1993
- Plays: Right-handed
- Prize money: US$242,556

Singles
- Career record: 12–27
- Career titles: 0
- Highest ranking: No. 93 (October 28, 1990)

Doubles
- Career record: 40–43
- Career titles: 2
- Highest ranking: No. 42 (August 12, 1991)

Brian Garrow (born April 8, 1968) is a former professional tennis player from the United States.

Garrow competed in doubles events from 1988 through 1992, winning two titles and reaching a top ranking of World No. 42 in 1991.

Garrow's top singles ranking was World No. 93, achieved in late October 1990. He captured one challenger tournament, the 1989 Winnetka Challenger, and reached the semi-finals in one Grand Prix event, the 1990 Rio de Janeiro Open. Garrow played on the tour in singles from 1988 through 1991, competing in challenger events.

Garrow was a three-time all-American at UCLA. He was the first player in the 1980s to reach the NCAA finals for both the singles and doubles tournament in the same year, 1988, winning the doubles partnering Patrick Galbraith. He lost in the singles final to Robbie Weiss of Pepperdine.

== Career finals ==
=== Doubles (2 titles, 2 runner-ups) ===
Result	W/L	Date	Tournament	Surface	Partner	Opponents	Score
Win	1–0	Jul 1989	Newport, U.S.	Grass	(United States) Patrick Galbraith	(United Kingdom) Neil Broad (South Africa) Stefan Kruger	2–6, 7–5, 6–3
Win	2–0	Apr 1990	Rio de Janeiro, Brazil	Carpet	(United States) Sven Salumaa	(Brazil) Nelson Aerts (Brazil) Fernando Roese	7–5, 6–3
Loss	2–1	Aug 1990	Schenectady, U.S.	Hard	(United States) Sven Salumaa	(Australia) Richard Fromberg (United States) Brad Pearce	2–6, 6–3, 6–7
Loss	2–2	Sep 1990	Brisbane, Australia	Hard	(Australia) Mark Woodforde	(Australia) Jason Stoltenberg (Australia) Todd Woodbridge	6–2, 4–6, 4–6
