= Patrick McEnroe =

American tennis player (born 1966)

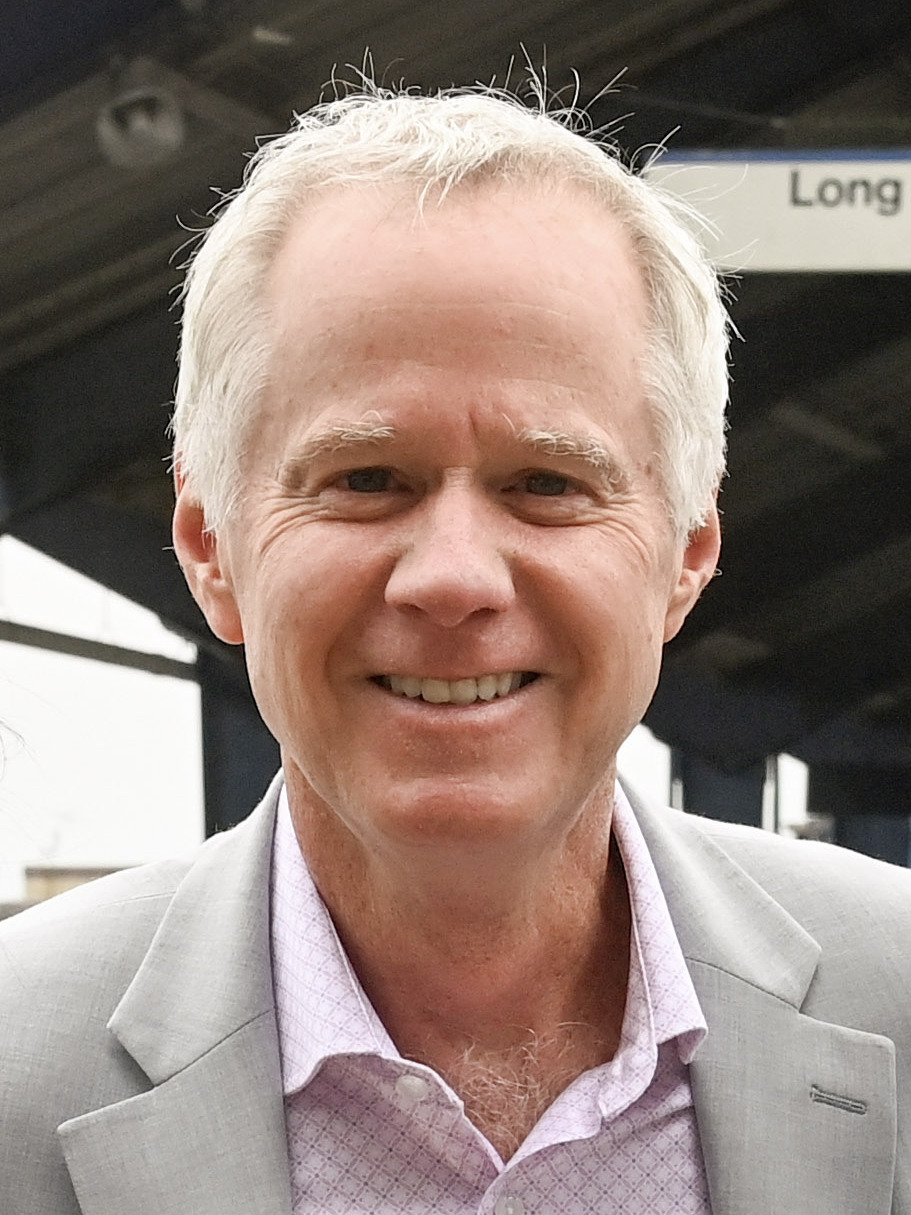
- McEnroe in 2026
- Country (sports): United States
- Residence: Bronxville, New York, U.S.
- Born: July 1, 1966 (age 60) Manhasset, New York, U.S.
- Height: 6 ft 0 in (1.83 m)
- Turned pro: 1988
- Retired: 1998
- Plays: Right-handed (two-handed backhand)
- Prize money: $3,118,316

Singles
- Career record: 140–163
- Career titles: 1
- Highest ranking: No. 28 (September 11, 1995)

Grand Slam singles results
- Australian Open: SF (1991)
- French Open: 3R (1991)
- Wimbledon: 2R (1991, 1992, 1995)
- US Open: QF (1995)

Other tournaments
- Grand Slam Cup: QF (1991)

Doubles
- Career record: 310–182
- Career titles: 16
- Highest ranking: No. 3 (April 12, 1993)

Grand Slam doubles results
- Australian Open: F (1991)
- French Open: W (1989)
- Wimbledon: QF (1992, 1993)
- US Open: QF (1988, 1994)

Other doubles tournaments
- Tour Finals: W (1989)

Grand Slam mixed doubles results
- US Open: F (1988)

Patrick William McEnroe (born July 1, 1966) is an American former professional tennis player, broadcaster, and former captain of the United States Davis Cup team.

Born in Manhasset, New York, he is John McEnroe's youngest brother. He won one singles title and 16 doubles titles, including the 1989 French Open. His career-high rankings were world No. 28 in singles and world No. 3 in doubles.

On May 1, 2023, McEnroe began his tenure as President of the International Tennis Hall of Fame.

== Juniors ==
McEnroe started playing tennis as a young boy and was taught at the Port Washington Tennis Academy, where his brother John also played. As a junior, Patrick reached the semifinals of Wimbledon and the US Open boys' singles in 1983. He partnered with Luke Jensen to win the French junior doubles and the USTA Boys' 18 National and Clay Court titles in 1984. He also made his first impact on the professional tour that year, teaming up with brother John to win the doubles title at Richmond, Virginia. He won the men's doubles gold medal at the 1987 Pan American Games with Jensen, and helped Stanford University win the NCAA team championship in 1986 and 1988. While at Stanford, he was a member of the Sigma Alpha Epsilon fraternity. McEnroe graduated from Stanford in 1988 with a degree in political science, and then joined the professional tennis tour.

== Professional career ==
In 1989, McEnroe won the French Open men's doubles title and the Masters doubles title, partnering with Jim Grabb.

His first career singles final came in 1991 at Chicago, where he faced his brother John, who won the match 3–6, 6–2, 6–4. (This was the second time in tour history where two brothers faced each other in a tournament final, after Emilio Sánchez and Javier Sánchez met in the Madrid final in 1987.)

His best Grand Slam singles performance came at the 1991 Australian Open, where he reached the semifinals before being knocked-out by eventual-champion Boris Becker. Commenting on his fellow semifinalists, he told the press: "It's just like you all expected – Edberg, Lendl, McEnroe and Becker". He was also runner-up in the men's doubles at the Australian Open that year, partnering with his former Stanford teammate David Wheaton.

McEnroe won the men's singles at the Sydney Outdoor Championships in 1995, to claim his only career singles title. He also had some notable Grand Slam singles results that year – beating Boris Becker in the first round of the Australian Open (before eventually losing in the fourth round), and then reaching the quarterfinals of the US Open where he lost to Becker in an epic four-hour and seven-minute four-set marathon.

McEnroe acted as a catalyst for fellow tennis champion (and older brother John's own rival) Jimmy Connors's run during the 1991 US Open. In the first round of the 1991 US Open, McEnroe led Connors two sets and 3–0 in the third set but Connors came back to win in five sets, walking off the court at 1:35 in the morning, after 4 hours and 18 minutes of play.

McEnroe retired from the professional tour in 1998.

=== Davis Cup ===
In the Davis Cup, McEnroe represented his country as a doubles player in 1993, 1994 and 1996, compiling a 3–1 record. In 2000, after older-brother John resigned following an unhappy 14-month spell as captain, he was named the 38th captain of the United States Davis Cup team.

With McEnroe as captain, the Davis Cup team won the Cup for the U.S. in December 2007. He resigned the position of team captain on September 6, 2010. His time as captain is the longest of any US Davis Cup captain.

=== General manager of USTA player development ===
In 2008, McEnroe became general manager of USTA player development. A series of mandates aimed at promoting junior tennis, including a requirement that all players age ten and under (U10) compete on miniature courts using new lightweight "green dot" tennis balls, have been controversial. The smaller format is designed to make tennis more accessible to children but critics argue that it will inhibit development. Coach Robert Lansdorp said in September 2013 that the format "is wrong for the very talented players" that become champions and noted that Maria Sharapova, Monica Seles and the Williams sisters were already competing on regular courts by age 7.

In 2012, tennis coach Wayne Bryan, father of the Bryan brothers, wrote a letter expressing concern about the effects USTA mandates were having on players and coaches around the country. McEnroe responded, calling Bryan's criticisms "scattershot" and "filled with holes, hearsay and half truths". At the December 2012 "Riv It Up" USPTA Education Event held at the Riviera Country Club in Pacific Palisades, California, professional coaches united to support Bryan in a "packed" meeting with USTA director Craig Jones that drew attendees from as far away as Arizona. Fox News commentator Sean Hannity, the father of two junior players, posted his own analysis online "urging the immediate reversal of the USTA's new rules for juniors competition". Former world No. 1 John McEnroe, owner of Sportime Tennis Center on Randalls Island, New York, agrees that the tennis federation his younger brother Patrick advocates is unlikely to produce a champion.

On September 3, 2014, Patrick McEnroe was relieved of his duties as Head of Player Development for the USTA. Jon Wertheim of Sports Illustrated reports McEnroe was "forced out of his job" after a six-year tenure. The announcement was made during the US Open Tennis Championship in Flushing Meadows, New York, where for the second consecutive year, and only the second time in its 134-year history, no American men advanced past the third round. It is the latest indicator that the United States has lost its place in the upper echelon of professional tennis. The last American man to win a Grand Slam title was Andy Roddick in 2003.

On April 5, 2015, Martin Blackman was announced as the new Head of Player Development for the USTA.

== Broadcast career ==
McEnroe currently works as a broadcaster for ESPN and a contributor to CNN. He previously worked for CBS from 1996 to 2008. McEnroe has worked for ESPN since 1995, where his versatility allows him to work play-by-play, as a studio host, or analyst. He is regularly paired with his brother John or Darren Cahill. Patrick works as the lead play-by-play man for many of ESPN's tennis events.

== Personal life ==
On December 19, 1998, McEnroe married singer and actress Melissa Errico. They have three daughters, Victoria Penny (born 2006) and twins Juliette Beatrice and Diana Katherine (born 2008). They live in Bronxville, New York. In 2024, McEnroe recorded public service announcements for the US Open for MTA New York City Transit. These announcements have played every year throughout since then.

== Honors ==
- McEnroe served as captain of the US men's tennis team at the 2004 Summer Olympics in Athens.
- In November 2012, McEnroe was announced as a 2013 recipient of the NCAA Silver Anniversary Award, presented annually to six distinguished former college student-athletes on the 25th anniversary of the end of their college sports careers.

== Grand Slam finals ==
=== Doubles: 2 (1 title, 1 runner-up) ===
Result	Year	Championship	Surface	Partner	Opponents	Score
Win	1989	French Open	Clay	(United States) Jim Grabb	(Iran) Mansour Bahrami (France) Éric Winogradsky	6–4, 2–6, 6–4, 7–6^{(7–5)}
Loss	1991	Australian Open	Hard	(United States) David Wheaton	(United States) Scott Davis (United States) David Pate	7–6^{(7–4)}, 6–7^{(8–10)}, 3–6, 5–7

=== Mixed doubles: 1 (1 runner-up) ===
Result	Year	Championship	Surface	Partner	Opponents	Score
Loss	1988	US Open	Hard	(Australia) Elizabeth Smylie	(Czechoslovakia) Jana Novotná (United States) Jim Pugh	5–7, 3–6

== ATP Tour finals ==
=== Singles: 4 (1 win / 3 losses) ===
Result	W/L	Date	Tournament	Surface	Opponent	Score
Loss	0–1	Feb 1991	Chicago, U.S.	Carpet (i)	(United States) John McEnroe	6–3, 2–6, 4–6
Loss	0–2	Jan 1994	Auckland, New Zealand	Hard	(Sweden) Magnus Gustafsson	4–6, 0–6
Loss	0–3	Sep 1994	Basel, Switzerland	Hard (i)	(South Africa) Wayne Ferreira	6–4, 2–6, 6–7^{(7–9)}, 3–6
Win	1–3	Jan 1995	Sydney, Australia	Hard	(Australia) Richard Fromberg	6–2, 7–6^{(7–4)}

=== Doubles: 37 (16 wins / 21 losses) ===
Legend Grand Slam (1) Tennis Masters Cup (1) ATP Masters Series (1) ATP Championship Series (2) ATP Tour (11)	Titles by surface Hard (7) Clay (2) Grass (1) Carpet (6)

Result	W/L	Date	Tournament	Surface	Partner	Opponent	Score
Win	1–0	Feb 1984	Richmond WCT, U.S.	Carpet (i)	(United States) John McEnroe	(South Africa) Kevin Curren (United States) Steve Denton	7–6, 6–2
Win	2–0	Oct 1987	San Francisco, U.S.	Carpet (i)	(United States) Jim Grabb	(United States) Glenn Layendecker (United States) Todd Witsken	6–2, 0–6, 6–4
Loss	2–1	Jul 1988	Schenectady, U.S.	Hard	(United States) Paul Annacone	(West Germany) Alexander Mronz (United States) Greg Van Emburgh	3–6, 7–6, 5–7
Loss	2–2	Aug 1988	Cincinnati, U.S.	Hard	(United States) Jim Grabb	(United States) Rick Leach (United States) Jim Pugh	2–6, 4–6
Loss	2–3	Apr 1989	Key Biscayne, U.S.	Hard	(United States) Jim Grabb	(Switzerland) Jakob Hlasek (Sweden) Anders Järryd	3–6, ret
Loss	2–4	Apr 1989	Rio de Janeiro, Brazil	Carpet	(United States) Tim Wilkison	(Mexico) Jorge Lozano (United States) Todd Witsken	6–2, 4–6, 4–6
Win	3–4	Jun 1989	French Open, Paris	Clay	(United States) Jim Grabb	(Iran) Mansour Bahrami (France) Éric Winogradsky	6–4, 2–6, 6–4, 7–6
Loss	3–5	Jul 1989	Washington, D.C., U.S.	Hard	(United States) Jim Grabb	(United Kingdom) Neil Broad (South Africa) Gary Muller	7–6, 6–7, 4–6
Win	4–5	Dec 1989	Masters Doubles, London	Carpet (i)	(United States) Jim Grabb	(Australia) John Fitzgerald (Sweden) Anders Järryd	7–5, 7–6, 5–7, 6–3
Loss	4–6	Mar 1990	Indian Wells, U.S.	Hard	(United States) Jim Grabb	(West Germany) Boris Becker (France) Guy Forget	6–4, 4–6, 3–6
Loss	4–7	Jun 1990	Rosmalen, Netherlands	Grass	(United States) Jim Grabb	(Switzerland) Jakob Hlasek (West Germany) Michael Stich	6–7, 3–6
Win	5–7	Nov 1990	Wembley, England	Carpet (i)	(United States) Jim Grabb	(United States) Rick Leach (United States) Jim Pugh	7–6, 4–6, 6–3
Loss	5–8	Jan 1991	Melbourne, Australia	Hard	(United States) David Wheaton	(United States) Scott Davis (United States) David Pate	7–6, 6–7, 3–6, 5–7
Win	6–8	Sep 1991	Basel, Switzerland	Hard (i)	(Switzerland) Jakob Hlasek	(Czech Republic) Petr Korda (United States) John McEnroe	3–6, 7–6, 7–6
Loss	6–9	Oct 1991	Vienna, Austria	Carpet	(Switzerland) Jakob Hlasek	(Sweden) Anders Järryd (South Africa) Gary Muller	4–6, 5–7
Win	7–9	Apr 1992	Madrid, Spain	Clay	(United States) Patrick Galbraith	(Spain) Francisco Clavet (Spain) Carlos Costa	6–3, 6–2
Loss	7–10	Aug 1992	Cincinnati, U.S.	Hard	(United States) Jonathan Stark	(Australia) Mark Woodforde (Australia) Todd Woodbridge	3–6, 6–1, 3–6
Loss	7–11	Aug 1992	New Haven, U.S.	Hard	(United States) Jared Palmer	(United States) Rick Leach (United States) Kelly Jones	6–7, 7–6, 2–6
Loss	7–12	Oct 1992	Brisbane, Australia	Hard (i)	(United States) Jonathan Stark	(United States) Steve DeVries (Australia) David Macpherson	4–6, 4–6
Win	8–12	Oct 1992	Sydney Indoor, Australia	Hard (i)	(United States) Jonathan Stark	(United States) Jim Grabb (United States) Richey Reneberg	6–2, 6–3
Win	9–12	Nov 1992	Paris Indoor, France	Carpet (i)	(United States) John McEnroe	(United States) Patrick Galbraith (South Africa) Danie Visser	6–4, 6–2
Loss	9–13	Nov 1992	Antwerp, Belgium	Carpet	(United States) Jared Palmer	(Australia) John Fitzgerald (Sweden) Anders Järryd	2–6, 2–6
Loss	9–14	Feb 1993	San Francisco, U.S.	Hard (i)	(United States) Jonathan Stark	(United States) Scott Davis (Netherlands) Jacco Eltingh	1–6, 6–4, 5–7
Loss	9–15	Mar 1993	Miami, U.S.	Hard	(United States) Jonathan Stark	(Netherlands) Richard Krajicek (Netherlands) Jan Siemerink	7–6, 4–6, 6–7
Win	10–15	May 1993	Coral Springs, U.S.	Clay	(United States) Jonathan Stark	(United States) Paul Annacone (United States) Doug Flach	6–4, 6–3
Win	11–15	Jun 1993	Rosmalen, Netherlands	Grass	(United States) Jonathan Stark	(South Africa) David Adams (Russia) Andrei Olhovskiy	7–6, 1–6, 6–4
Win	12–15	Oct 1993	Sydney Indoor, Australia	Hard (i)	(United States) Richey Reneberg	(Germany) Alexander Mronz (Germany) Lars Rehmann	6–3, 7–5
Win	13–15	Jan 1994	Auckland, New Zealand	Hard	(United States) Jared Palmer	(Canada) Grant Connell (United States) Patrick Galbraith	6–2, 4–6, 6–4
Loss	13–16	Apr 1994	Tokyo Outdoor, Japan	Hard	(Canada) Sébastien Lareau	(Sweden) Henrik Holm (Sweden) Anders Järryd	6–7, 1–6
Loss	13–17	Jul 1994	Toronto, Canada	Hard	(United States) Jared Palmer	(Zimbabwe) Byron Black (United States) Jonathan Stark	4–6, 4–6
Win	14–17	Sep 1994	Basel, Switzerland	Hard (i)	(United States) Jared Palmer	(South Africa) Lan Bale (South Africa) John-Laffnie de Jager	6–3, 7–6
Loss	14–18	Oct 1994	Toulouse, France	Hard	(United States) Jared Palmer	(Netherlands) Menno Oosting (Czech Republic) Daniel Vacek	6–7, 7–6, 3–6
Win	15–18	Feb 1995	San Jose, U.S.	Hard (i)	(United States) Jim Grabb	(United States) Alex O'Brien (Australia) Sandon Stolle	3–6, 7–5, 6–0
Loss	15–19	Mar 1995	Miami, U.S.	Hard	(United States) Jim Grabb	(Australia) Todd Woodbridge (Australia) Mark Woodforde	3–6, 6–7
Win	16–19	Oct 1995	Kuala Lumpur, Malaysia	Carpet (i)	(Australia) Mark Philippoussis	(Canada) Grant Connell (United States) Patrick Galbraith	7–5, 6–4
Loss	16–20	Oct 1995	Tokyo Indoor, Japan	Carpet	(Switzerland) Jakob Hlasek	(Netherlands) Jacco Eltingh (Netherlands) Paul Haarhuis	6–7, 4–6
Loss	16–21	Jan 1996	Sydney Outdoor, Australia	Hard	(Australia) Sandon Stolle	(South Africa) Ellis Ferreira (Netherlands) Jan Siemerink	7–5, 4–6, 1–6

Source: ATP player profile - titles and finals
