= Mark Keil =

American tennis player

- Country (sports): United States, Germany
- Residence: Honolulu, Hawaii, U.S.
- Born: June 3, 1967 (age 59) Mountain View, California, U.S.
- Height: 1.83 m (6 ft 0 in)
- Turned pro: 1988
- Retired: 2001
- Plays: Right-handed
- Prize money: $749,587

Singles
- Career record: 4–8
- Career titles: 0
- Highest ranking: No. 167 (July 22, 1991)

Grand Slam singles results
- Australian Open: 2R (1993)
- Wimbledon: 1R (1991, 1993)

Doubles
- Career record: 157–205
- Career titles: 5
- Highest ranking: No. 32 (October 2, 1995)

Grand Slam doubles results
- Australian Open: 3R (1992, 1996)
- Wimbledon: 2R (1993, 1994, 1996)
- US Open: 3R (1994, 1996)

Grand Slam mixed doubles results
- Australian Open: 2R (1996)
- Wimbledon: 3R (1996)

Mark Keil (born June 3, 1967) is a former professional tennis player from the United States who won five ATP Tour doubles tournaments and was runner up at eight more.

== Early life and college ==
Prior to college, Keil was raised in Albuquerque, NM and in 1985 he was the New Mexico high school state singles champion. Keil turned pro in the middle of his junior year (1987) from the University of South Florida when he was ranked #291 ATP singles and got a sponsor.

== Professional career ==
One of Keil's major career wins came in the second round of the 1991 Queen's Club Championships in London when he defeated Pete Sampras, then ranked 8th in the world, in straight sets. Keil went on to qualify in singles and play in the main draw at Wimbledon in 1991 and 1993 and reached a career-high ATP singles ranking of no. 167. He qualified and won a round in singles at the 1993 Australian Open.

Keil later carved a career for himself on the doubles tour, reaching a career-high ranking of no. 32 in 1995. He has doubles wins over Stefan Edberg, Yevgeny Kafelnikov, Boris Becker, Todd Martin, Tommy Haas, Andre Agassi, Gustavo Kuerten and Mark Philippoussis. He won five ATP Tour doubles titles in his career.

He also directed and produced with Geoff Grant a film documenting life behind the scenes for a tour professional. The Journeymen follows Keil and his sometimes doubles partner Geoff Grant, at the end of their careers, as they try to make a living on the doubles tour.

== Family ==
His father, Klaus Keil, was Emeritus Professor and a research scientist at the School of Ocean and Earth Science and Technology (SOEST) at the University of Hawaii at Manoa. Asteroid 5054 Keil, and the mineral keilite are named after Klaus. He has a former touring tennis pro sister, Kathrin Keil. He has a German passport, due to his parents lineage.

Keil was married from 1999–2001 to Dr. Camilla Hildebrand.

== ATP career finals ==
=== Doubles: 13 (5 titles / 8 runner-ups) ===
Result	W/L	Date	Tournament	Surface	Partner	Opponents	Score
Loss	0–1	Mar 1991	Atlanta, U.S.	Clay	(United States) Dave Randall	(United States) Steve DeVries (Australia) David Macpherson	3–6, 3–6
Win	1–1	Mar 1992	Scottsdale, U.S.	Hard	(United States) Dave Randall	(United States) Kent Kinnear (United States) Sven Salumaa	4–6, 6–1, 6–2
Loss	1–2	Nov 1992	Búzios, Brazil	Hard	(United States) Tom Mercer	(Venezuela) Maurice Ruah (Cuba) Mario Tabares	6–7, 7–6, 4–6
Win	2–2	Mar 1993	Scottsdale, USA	Hard	(United States) Dave Randall	(United States) Luke Jensen (Australia) Sandon Stolle	7–5, 6–4
Win	3–2	Apr 1993	Osaka, Japan	Hard	(South Africa) Christo van Rensburg	(Canada) Glenn Michibata (United States) David Pate	7–6, 6–3
Win	4–2	Mar 1995	Copenhagen, Denmark	Carpet	(Sweden) Peter Nyborg	(France) Guillaume Raoux (United Kingdom) Greg Rusedski	6–7, 6–4, 7–6
Win	5–2	Mar 1995	Bucharest, Romania	Clay	(United States) Jeff Tarango	(Czech Republic) Cyril Suk (Czech Republic) Daniel Vacek	6–4, 7–6
Loss	5–3	Oct 1995	Basel, Switzerland	Hard	(Sweden) Peter Nyborg	(Czech Republic) Cyril Suk (Czech Republic) Daniel Vacek	6–3, 3–6, 3–6
Loss	5–4	Feb 1997	Zagreb, Croatia	Carpet	(South Africa) Brent Haygarth	(Croatia) Saša Hiršzon (Croatia) Goran Ivanišević	4–6, 3–6
Loss	5–5	Aug 1997	Long Island, U.S.	Hard	(United States) T. J. Middleton	(South Africa) Marcos Ondruska (Germany) David Prinosil	4–6, 4–6
Loss	5–6	Feb 1998	Marseilles, France	Hard	(United States) T. J. Middleton	(United States) Donald Johnson (United States) Francisco Montana	4–6, 6–3, 3–6
Loss	5–7	May 1999	Prague, Czech Republic	Clay	(Ecuador) Nicolás Lapentti	(Czech Republic) Martin Damm (Czech Republic) Radek Štěpánek	0–6, 2–6
Loss	5–8	Sep 1999	Tashkent, Uzbekistan	Hard	(Switzerland) Lorenzo Manta	(Uzbekistan) Oleg Ogorodov (Switzerland) Marc Rosset	6–7^{(4–7)}, 6–7^{(1–7)}

Source: ATP
