= Todd Witsken =

American tennis player

- Country (sports): United States
- Born: November 4, 1963 Indianapolis, Indiana, US
- Died: May 25, 1998 (aged 34) Zionsville, Indiana, US
- Turned pro: 1985
- Retired: 1993
- Plays: Right-handed (one-handed backhand)
- College: University of Southern California
- Prize money: $1,420,910

Singles
- Career record: 115–136
- Career titles: 0
- Highest ranking: No. 43 (November 13, 1989)

Grand Slam singles results
- Australian Open: QF (1988)
- French Open: 2R (1988, 1989)
- Wimbledon: 2R (1986, 1989)
- US Open: 4R (1986)

Doubles
- Career record: 222–148
- Career titles: 12
- Highest ranking: No. 4 (August 29, 1988)

Grand Slam doubles results
- Australian Open: 3R (1988)
- French Open: QF (1988, 1990)
- Wimbledon: QF (1991)
- US Open: SF (1988)

Todd Witsken (November 4, 1963 – May 25, 1998) was an American tennis player.

== Biography ==
He was one of eight children born to Marilyn and Henry Witsken in Carmel, Indiana.

He specialized in playing doubles and began his professional career in 1985. He was a three-time all-American at the University of Southern California. His career-high rankings were world No. 43 in singles and No. 4 in doubles.

His biggest singles win was at the 1986 US Open, where he beat five-time US Open champion, Jimmy Connors, 6–2, 6–4, 7–5, in their third-round match. It was the first time since 1973 that Connors had failed to reach the US Open semifinals.

In 1989, Witsken lost to Greg Holmes 7–5, 4–6, 6–7^{(5)}, 6–4, 12–14, in the second round at Wimbledon, a match that was the longest men's singles match at Wimbledon, timed at 5 hours 28 minutes, until the record-breaking Isner-Mahut match in 2010.

He was known for using the MAD RAQ - an innovative, three-directionally-strung racket based on the weave of a snowshoe.

Witsken retired just before the 1993 US Open and died from brain cancer on May 25, 1998, at the age of 34.

== Personal life ==
Witsken had four children. His nephew is professional tennis player Ben Shelton.

== ATP career finals ==
Legend
Grand Slam (0)
ATP Masters Series (2)
ATP International Series Gold (0)
ATP Tour (10)

=== Doubles: 21 (12 wins, 9 losses) ===
Result	No.	Date	Tournament	Surface	Partner	Opponents	Score
Loss	1.	Oct 1987	San Francisco, US	Carpet (i)	(United States) Glenn Layendecker	(United States) Jim Grabb (United States) Patrick McEnroe	2–6, 6–0, 4–6
Loss	2.	Mar 1988	Indian Wells, US	Hard	(Mexico) Jorge Lozano	(Germany) Boris Becker (France) Guy Forget	4–6, 4–6
Loss	3.	May 1988	Charleston, US	Clay	(Mexico) Jorge Lozano	(South Africa) Pieter Aldrich (South Africa) Danie Visser	6–7^{(3–7)}, 3–6
Win	1.	May 1988	Forest Hills, US	Clay	(Mexico) Jorge Lozano	(South Africa) Pieter Aldrich (South Africa) Danie Visser	6–3, 7–6
Win	2.	May 1988	Rome, Italy	Clay	(Mexico) Jorge Lozano	(Sweden) Anders Järryd (Czech Republic) Tomáš Šmíd	6–3, 6–3
Win	3.	Jul 1988	Boston, US	Clay	(Mexico) Jorge Lozano	(Socialist Federal Republic of Yugoslavia) Bruno Orešar (Peru) Jaime Yzaga	6–2, 7–5
Loss	4.	Jul 1988	Washington, US	Hard	(Mexico) Jorge Lozano	(United States) Rick Leach (United States) Jim Pugh	3–6, 7–6, 2–6
Win	4.	Jul 1988	Stratton Mountain, US	Hard	(Mexico) Jorge Lozano	(South Africa) Pieter Aldrich (South Africa) Danie Visser	6–3, 7–6
Loss	5.	Nov 1988	Itaparica, Brazil	Hard	(Mexico) Jorge Lozano	(Spain) Sergio Casal (Spain) Emilio Sánchez	6–7^{(4–7)}, 6–7^{(4–7)}
Win	5.	Apr 1989	Rio de Janeiro, Brazil	Carpet (i)	(Mexico) Jorge Lozano	(United States) Patrick McEnroe (United States) Tim Wilkison	2–6, 6–4, 6–4
Win	6.	Jul 1989	Gstaad, Switzerland	Clay	(Brazil) Cássio Motta	(Czech Republic) Petr Korda (Czech Republic) Milan Šrejber	6–4, 6–3
Win	7.	Aug 1989	Montreal, Canada	Hard	(New Zealand) Kelly Evernden	(United States) Charles Beckman (United States) Shelby Cannon	6–3, 6–3
Win	8.	Nov 1989	Stockholm, Sweden	Carpet (i)	(Mexico) Jorge Lozano	(United States) Rick Leach (United States) Jim Pugh	6–3, 5–7, 6–3
Loss	6.	Nov 1989	Itaparica, Brazil	Hard	(Mexico) Jorge Lozano	(United States) Rick Leach (United States) Jim Pugh	2–6, 6–7
Loss	7.	Jul 1990	Washington, USA	Hard	(Mexico) Jorge Lozano	(Canada) Grant Connell (Canada) Glenn Michibata	3–6, 7–6, 2–6
Loss	8.	Oct 1990	Vienna, Austria	Carpet (i)	(Mexico) Jorge Lozano	(Germany) Udo Riglewski (Germany) Michael Stich	4–6, 4–6
Win	9.	Apr 1991	Hong Kong, UK	Hard	(United States) Patrick Galbraith	(Canada) Glenn Michibata (United States) Robert Van't Hof	6–2, 6–4
Win	10.	May 1991	Munich, Germany	Clay	(United States) Patrick Galbraith	(Sweden) Anders Järryd (South Africa) Danie Visser	7–5, 6–4
Win	11.	Jul 1991	Montreal, Canada	Hard	(United States) Patrick Galbraith	(Canada) Grant Connell (Canada) Glenn Michibata	6–4, 3–6, 6–1
Win	12.	Mar 1992	Key Biscayne, US	Hard	(United States) Ken Flach	(United States) Kent Kinnear (United States) Sven Salumaa	6–4, 6–3
Loss	9.	Jul 1992	Washington, USA	Hard	(United States) Ken Flach	(United States) Bret Garnett (United States) Jared Palmer	2–6, 3–6

=== Singles: 1 (1 runner-up) ===
Result	No.	Date	Tournament	Surface	Opponent	Score
Loss	1.	Feb 1990	San Francisco, US	Hard (i)	(United States) Andre Agassi	1–6, 3–6
