= Kent Kinnear =

American tennis player

- Country (sports): United States
- Residence: West Lebanon, Indiana, U.S.
- Born: November 30, 1966 (age 59) Naperville, Illinois U.S.
- Height: 6 ft 5 in (1.96 m)
- Turned pro: 1988
- Plays: Right-handed
- Prize money: $771,749

Singles
- Career record: 9–22
- Career titles: 0
- Highest ranking: No. 163 (July 13, 1992)

Grand Slam singles results
- Australian Open: 1R (1989, 1994)
- Wimbledon: 2R (1992)

Doubles
- Career record: 176–210
- Career titles: 4
- Highest ranking: No. 24 (August 10, 1992)

Grand Slam doubles results
- Australian Open: 3R (1993, 1997)
- French Open: 2R (1992, 1998)
- Wimbledon: 3R (1992)
- US Open: 2R (1990, 1995, 1998)

Mixed doubles
- Career record: 5–12
- Career titles: 0

Grand Slam mixed doubles results
- Australian Open: 2R (1998)
- French Open: 1R (1996, 1998)
- Wimbledon: 3R (1997)
- US Open: 2R (1995)

Kent Kinnear (born November 30, 1966) is a former professional tennis player from the United States.

Kinnear enjoyed most of his tennis success while playing doubles. During his career, he won four doubles titles and finished runner-up an additional 15 times. He achieved a career-high doubles ranking of World No. 24 in 1992.

== Career finals ==
=== Doubles: 19 (4 wins, 15 losses) ===
Legend Grand Slam (0–0) Tennis Masters Cup (0–0) ATP Masters Series (0–2) ATP International Series Gold (0–2) ATP World Series (11–4)	Finals by surface Hard (1–12) Clay (2–0) Grass (0–2) Carpet (1–1)

Result	W/L	Date	Tournament	Surface	Partner	Opponents	Score
Loss	0–1	Apr 1990	Tokyo Outdoor, Japan	Hard	(United States) Brad Pearce	(Australia) Mark Kratzmann (Australia) Wally Masur	6–3, 3–6, 4–6
Loss	0–2	Apr 1991	Seoul, South Korea	Hard	(United States) Sven Salumaa	(Austria) Alex Antonitsch (Israel) Gilad Bloom	6–7, 1–6
Loss	0–3	Aug 1991	Indianapolis, U.S.	Hard	(United States) Sven Salumaa	(United States) Ken Flach (United States) Robert Seguso	6–7, 4–6
Win	1–3	Sep 1991	Brasília, Brazil	Clay	(The Bahamas) Roger Smith	(Brazil) Ricardo Acioly (Brazil) Mauro Menezes	6–4, 6–3
Loss	1–4	Mar 1992	Scottsdale, U.S.	Hard	(United States) Sven Salumaa	(United States) Mark Keil (United States) Dave Randall	6–4, 1–6, 2–6
Loss	1–5	Mar 1992	Indian Wells, U.S.	Hard	(United States) Sven Salumaa	(United States) Steve DeVries (Australia) David Macpherson	6–4, 3–6, 3–6
Loss	1–6	Mar 1992	Miami, U.S.	Hard	(United States) Sven Salumaa	(United States) Ken Flach (United States) Todd Witsken	4–6, 3–6
Loss	1–7	Oct 1992	Vienna, Austria	Carpet	(Germany) Udo Riglewski	(Sweden) Ronnie Båthman (Sweden) Anders Järryd	3–6, 5–7
Loss	1–8	Apr 1994	Seoul, South Korea	Hard	(Canada) Sébastien Lareau	(France) Stephane Simian (United States) Kenny Thorne	4–6, 6–3, 5–7
Loss	1–9	Jul 1994	Newport, U.S.	Grass	(United States) David Wheaton	(Austria) Alex Antonitsch (Canada) Greg Rusedski	4–6, 6–3, 4–6
Win	2–9	Oct 1994	Beijing, China	Carpet	(United States) Tommy Ho	(South Africa) David Adams (Russia) Andrei Olhovskiy	7–6, 6–3
Win	3–9	Aug 1995	Los Angeles, U.S.	Hard	(South Africa) Brent Haygarth	(United States) Scott Davis (Croatia) Goran Ivanišević	6–4, 7–6
Loss	3–10	Oct 1995	Tel Aviv, Israel	Hard	(United States) David Wheaton	(United States) Jim Grabb (United States) Jared Palmer	4–6, 5–7
Loss	3–11	Jan 1996	Jakarta, Indonesia	Hard	(United States) Dave Randall	(United States) Rick Leach (United States) Scott Melville	1–6, 6–2, 1–6
Loss	3–12	Apr 1996	Hong Kong	Hard	(United States) Dave Randall	(United States) Patrick Galbraith (Russia) Andrei Olhovskiy	3–6, 7–6, 6–7
Loss	3–13	Oct 1996	Singapore	Hard	(Zimbabwe) Kevin Ullyett	(United States) Rick Leach (United States) Jonathan Stark	4–6, 4–6
Loss	3–14	Jul 1997	Newport, U.S.	Grass	(North Macedonia) Aleksandar Kitinov	(United States) Justin Gimelstob (New Zealand) Brett Steven	3–6, 4–6
Win	4–14	Sep 1997	Bournemouth, UK	Clay	(North Macedonia) Aleksandar Kitinov	(Spain) Alberto Martín (United Kingdom) Chris Wilkinson	7–6, 6–2
Loss	4–15	Mar 1998	Scottsdale, U.S.	Hard	(United States) David Wheaton	(Australia) Michael Tebbutt (Czech Republic) Cyril Suk	6–4, 1–6, 6–7
