= 1994 Hall of Fame Tennis Championships – Singles =

Singles
- 1994 Hall of Fame Tennis Championships

Final
- Champion: (United States) David Wheaton
- Runner-up: (Australia) Todd Woodbridge
- Score: 6–4, 3–6, 7–6^{(7–5)}

Details
- Draw: 32 (3WC/4Q)
- Seeds: 8

Events
| Singles | Doubles |
| ← 1993 · | Hall of Fame Open | · 1995 → |

Greg Rusedski was the defending champion, but lost in the second round to David Witt.

David Wheaton won the title by defeating Todd Woodbridge 6–4, 3–6, 7–6^{(7–5)} in the final.

== Seeds ==
1. (Canada) Greg Rusedski (second round)
2. (Australia) Jason Stoltenberg (quarterfinals)
3. (Australia) Jamie Morgan (second round)
4. (New Zealand) Brett Steven (first round)
5. (Austria) Alex Antonitsch (first round)
6. (Zimbabwe) Byron Black (semifinals)
7. (Argentina) Javier Frana (second round)
8. (Germany) Jörn Renzenbrink (first round)

== Draw ==
=== Key ===
- Q = Qualifier
- WC = Wild card
- LL = Lucky loser
- Alt = Alternate
- ITF = ITF entry
- PR = Protected ranking
- SR = Special ranking
- SE = Special exempt
- JE = Junior exempt
- JR = Junior Accelerator Programme entrant
- CO = College Accelerator Programme entrant
- NG = Next Gen Accelerator Program entrant
- w/o = Walkover
- r = Retired
- d = Defaulted

=== Finals ===
Semifinals
(United Kingdom) Mark Petchey | 6 | 3 | 4
(United States) David Wheaton | 4 | 6 | 6
6 | (Zimbabwe) Byron Black | 6 | 4 | 6^{1}
(Australia) Todd Woodbridge | 4 | 6 | 7^{7}

Final
(United States) David Wheaton | 6 | 3 | 7^{7}
(Australia) Todd Woodbridge | 4 | 6 | 6^{5}

=== Top half ===
First round
1 | (Canada) G Rusedski | 6 | 6
(United States) D Flach | 4 | 1
Q | (United States) D Witt | 6 | 7
(Canada) D Nestor | 2 | 5
WC | (United States) W McGuire | 3 | 4
(United Kingdom) M Petchey | 6 | 6
WC | (United States) B MacPhie | 4 | 6^{3}
7 | (Argentina) J Frana | 6 | 7^{7}
4 | (New Zealand) B Steven | 2 | 6 | 3
(United States) B Shelton | 6 | 3 | 6
(Venezuela) M Ruah | 1 | 2
(United States) D Wheaton | 6 | 6
(Venezuela) N Pereira | 6 | 6^{4} | 6
(United States) M Joyce | 3 | 7^{7} | 4
(Germany) D Prinosil | 6 | 6
5 | (Austria) A Antonitsch | 1 | 3

Second round
1 | (Canada) G Rusedski | 4 | 7^{7} | 3
Q | (United States) D Witt | 6 | 6^{5} | 6
(United Kingdom) M Petchey | 6 | 6
7 | (Argentina) J Frana | 4 | 4
(United States) B Shelton | 4 | 4
(United States) D Wheaton | 6 | 6
(Venezuela) N Pereira | 4 | 3
(Germany) D Prinosil | 6 | 6

Quarterfinals
Q | (United States) D Witt | 4 | 6 | 3
(United Kingdom) M Petchey | 6 | 3 | 6
(United States) D Wheaton | 7^{7} | 6
(Germany) D Prinosil | 6^{4} | 1

Semifinals
(United Kingdom) M Petchey | 6 | 3 | 4
(United States) D Wheaton | 4 | 6 | 6

=== Bottom half ===
First round
6 | (Zimbabwe) B Black | 7^{7} | 4 | 6
(United States) J Grabb | 6^{2} | 6 | 2
WC | (United States) L Gloria | 6^{4} | 3
(Australia) M Tebbutt | 7^{7} | 6
Q | (United States) K Thorne | 6^{6} | 6 | 3
Q | (South Africa) M Kaplan | 7^{8} | 4 | 6
(United States) A O'Brien | 2 | 7 | 4
3 | (Australia) J Morgan | 6 | 5 | 6
8 | (Germany) J Renzenbrink | 6 | 6^{4} | 3
(Australia) N Borwick | 1 | 7^{7} | 6
(France) S Simian | 6^{5} | 7 | 1
(Australia) T Woodbridge | 7^{7} | 5 | 6
(Italy) G Pozzi | 6 | 3 | 4
Q | (United States) V Spadea | 3 | 6 | 6
(Zimbabwe) K Ullyett | 4 | 3
2 | (Australia) J Stoltenberg | 6 | 6

Second round
6 | (Zimbabwe) B Black | 2 | 7^{7} | 6
(Australia) M Tebbutt | 6 | 6^{2} | 2
Q | (South Africa) M Kaplan | 6 | 6
3 | (Australia) J Morgan | 4 | 3
(Australia) N Borwick | 3 | 2
(Australia) T Woodbridge | 6 | 6
Q | (United States) V Spadea | 2 | 2
2 | (Australia) J Stoltenberg | 6 | 6

Quarterfinals
6 | (Zimbabwe) B Black | 6 | 4
Q | (South Africa) M Kaplan | 4 | 1^{r}
(Australia) T Woodbridge | 6 | 5 | 7^{7}
2 | (Australia) J Stoltenberg | 3 | 7 | 6^{4}

Semifinals
6 | (Zimbabwe) B Black | 6 | 4 | 6^{1}
(Australia) T Woodbridge | 4 | 6 | 7^{7}
