= 1994 Hall of Fame Tennis Championships – Doubles =

Doubles
- 1994 Hall of Fame Tennis Championships

Final
- Champions: (Austria) Alex Antonitsch (Canada) Greg Rusedski
- Runners-up: (United States) Kent Kinnear (United States) David Wheaton
- Score: 6–4, 3–6, 6–4

Events
Singles	Doubles
← 1993 ·	Hall of Fame Open	· 1995 →

Javier Frana and Christo van Rensburg were the defending champions, but van Rensburg did not compete this year. Frana teamed up with Mark Petchey and lost in the quarterfinals to Paul Annacone and Doug Flach.

Alex Antonitsch and Greg Rusedski won the title by defeating Kent Kinnear and David Wheaton 6–4, 3–6, 6–4 in the final.

== Seeds ==
1. (United States) Brian MacPhie / (United States) Bryan Shelton (first round)
2. (Canada) Daniel Nestor / (United States) Alex O'Brien (quarterfinals)
3. (South Africa) Lan Bale / (New Zealand) Brett Steven (first round)
4. (United States) Paul Annacone / (United States) Doug Flach (semifinals)

== Draw ==
=== Key ===
- Q = Qualifier
- WC = Wild card
- LL = Lucky loser
- Alt = Alternate
- SE = Special exempt
- PR = Protected ranking
- ITF = ITF entry
- JE = Junior exempt
- w/o = Walkover
- r = Retired
- d = Defaulted
- SR = Special ranking

=== Draw ===
First round
1	(United States) B MacPhie (United States) B Shelton	4	4
WC	(Australia) J Morgan (Australia) J Stoltenberg	6	6
WC	(United States) Steve Griffin (United States) Andrew Kinney	4	4
(South Africa) E Ferreira (Zimbabwe) K Ullyett	6	6
3	(South Africa) L Bale (New Zealand) B Steven	4	4
(United States) K Kinnear (United States) D Wheaton	6	6
(United States) S DeVries (United States) M Lucena	6	4	6
(United States) B Garnett (South Africa) S Kruger	2	6	2
(Venezuela) N Pereira (Venezuela) M Ruah	4	6	2
(Argentina) J Frana (United Kingdom) M Petchey	6	4	6
(France) S Simian (United States) K Thorne	6	5	6
4	(United States) P Annacone (United States) D Flach	3	7	7
Q	(South Africa) R Koenig (United States) V Spadea	4	3
WC	(Austria) A Antonitsch (Canada) G Rusedski	6	6
(Sweden) P Nyborg (United States) J Sullivan	1	6
2	(Canada) D Nestor (United States) A O'Brien	6	7

Quarterfinals
WC	(Australia) J Morgan (Australia) J Stoltenberg	6	4	6
(South Africa) E Ferreira (Zimbabwe) K Ullyett	4	6	3
(United States) K Kinnear (United States) D Wheaton	6	6
(United States) S DeVries (United States) M Lucena	4	4
(Argentina) J Frana (United Kingdom) M Petchey	1	2
4	(United States) P Annacone (United States) D Flach	6	6
WC	(Austria) A Antonitsch (Canada) G Rusedski	7	6	6
2	(Canada) D Nestor (United States) A O'Brien	6	7	1

Semifinals
WC	(Australia) J Morgan (Australia) J Stoltenberg	6	6
(United States) K Kinnear (United States) D Wheaton	7	7
4	(United States) P Annacone (United States) D Flach	7	5	3
WC	(Austria) A Antonitsch (Canada) G Rusedski	6	7	6

Final
(United States) K Kinnear (United States) D Wheaton	4	6	4
WC	(Austria) A Antonitsch (Canada) G Rusedski	6	3	6
