= 1991 Miller Lite Hall of Fame Tennis Championships – Doubles =

Doubles
- 1991 Miller Lite Hall of Fame Tennis Championships

Final
- Champions: (Italy) Gianluca Pozzi (New Zealand) Brett Steven
- Runners-up: (Argentina) Javier Frana (United States) Bruce Steel
- Score: 6–4, 6–4

Details
- Draw: 16 (1WC/1Q)
- Seeds: 4

Events
Singles	Doubles
- Hall of Fame Open

Darren Cahill and Mark Kratzmann were the defending champions, but none competed this year. Kratzmann chose to compete only in the singles tournament, reaching the semifinals.

Gianluca Pozzi and Brett Steven won the title by defeating Javier Frana and Bruce Steel 6–4, 6–4 in the final.

== Seeds ==
1. (United States) Jeff Brown / (United States) Bret Garnett (first round)
2. (South Africa) Byron Talbot / (United States) Greg Van Emburgh (semifinals)
3. (Sweden) Henrik Holm / (Sweden) Peter Lundgren (first round)
4. (Australia) Neil Borwick / (Australia) Simon Youl (first round)

== Draw ==
Key

- Q = Qualifier
- WC = Wild card
- LL = Lucky loser
- Alt = Alternate
- ITF = ITF entry
- PR = Protected ranking
- SR = Special ranking
- SE = Special exempt
- JE = Junior exempt
- JR = Junior Accelerator Programme entrant
- CO = College Accelerator Programme entrant
- NG = Next Gen Accelerator Program entrant
- w/o = Walkover
- r = Retired
- d = Defaulted

=== Draw ===
First round
1	(United States) J Brown (United States) B Garnett	3	3
(United States) A Nizet (Argentina) D Orsanic	6	6
WC	(United States) J Palmer (United States) J Stark	4	3
(United States) F Montana (Australia) J Morgan	6	6
4	(Australia) N Borwick (Australia) S Youl	6	6	6
(Netherlands) J Eltingh (Germany) C Saceanu	4	7	7
(United States) T Martin (United States) J Sullivan	4	6
(Italy) G Pozzi (New Zealand) B Steven	6	7
Q	(United States) K Evans (The Bahamas) M Knowles	6	4	7
(Germany) P Baur (United States) T Mercer	1	6	5
(Argentina) J Frana (United States) B Steel	6	6
3	(Sweden) H Holm (Sweden) P Lundgren	2	3
(United States) G Layendecker (United States) J Rive	6	3
(United States) D Flach (United States) B Shelton	7	6
(United States) P Annacone (United States) J Kriek	6	2
2	(South Africa) B Talbot (United States) G Van Emburgh	7	6

Quarterfinals
(United States) A Nizet (Argentina) D Orsanic	1	6	1
(United States) F Montana (Australia) J Morgan	6	3	6
(Netherlands) J Eltingh (Germany) C Saceanu	5	6	6
(Italy) G Pozzi (New Zealand) B Steven	7	3	7
Q	(United States) K Evans (The Bahamas) M Knowles	6	4
(Argentina) J Frana (United States) B Steel	7	6
(United States) D Flach (United States) B Shelton	4	4
2	(South Africa) B Talbot (United States) G Van Emburgh	6	6

Semifinals
(United States) F Montana (Australia) J Morgan	4	6	4
(Italy) G Pozzi (New Zealand) B Steven	6	3	6
(Argentina) J Frana (United States) B Steel	7	6
2	(South Africa) B Talbot (United States) G Van Emburgh	6	4

Final
(Italy) G Pozzi (New Zealand) B Steven	6	6
(Argentina) J Frana (United States) B Steel	4	4
