= 1991 Miller Lite Hall of Fame Tennis Championships – Singles =

Singles
- 1991 Miller Lite Hall of Fame Tennis Championships

Final
- Champion: (United States) Bryan Shelton
- Runner-up: (Argentina) Javier Frana
- Score: 3–6, 6–4, 6–4

Details
- Draw: 32 (4WC/2Q/1LL)
- Seeds: 8

Events
| Singles | Doubles |
- Hall of Fame Open

Pieter Aldrich was the defending champion, but did not compete this year.

Bryan Shelton won the title by defeating Javier Frana 3–6, 6–4, 6–4 in the final.

== Seeds ==
1. (Sweden) Peter Lundgren (second round)
2. (Germany) Christian Saceanu (second round)
3. (Germany) Patrick Baur (first round)
4. (Netherlands) Jacco Eltingh (quarterfinals)
5. (South Africa) Christo van Rensburg (quarterfinals)
6. (United States) Dan Goldie (first round)
7. (Argentina) Javier Frana (final)
8. (Sweden) Henrik Holm (first round)

== Draw ==
Key

- Q = Qualifier
- WC = Wild card
- LL = Lucky loser
- Alt = Alternate
- ITF = ITF entry
- PR = Protected ranking
- SR = Special ranking
- SE = Special exempt
- JE = Junior exempt
- JR = Junior Accelerator Programme entrant
- CO = College Accelerator Programme entrant
- NG = Next Gen Accelerator Program entrant
- w/o = Walkover
- r = Retired
- d = Defaulted

=== Finals ===
Semifinals
(United States) Todd Martin | 5 | 4
(United States) Bryan Shelton | 7 | 6
(Australia) Mark Kratzmann | 2 | 6 | 5
7 | (Argentina) Javier Frana | 6 | 4 | 7

Final
(United States) Bryan Shelton | 3 | 6 | 6
7 | (Argentina) Javier Frana | 6 | 4 | 4

=== Top half ===
First round
1 | (Sweden) P Lundgren | 6 | 6
(United States) J Brown | 2 | 0
(United States) J Rive | 5 | 3
(United States) T Martin | 7 | 6
Q | (United States) A Nizet | 5 | 2
(Canada) M Wostenholme | 7 | 6
(United States) P Annacone | 4 | 6 | 7^{8}
8 | (Sweden) H Holm | 6 | 4 | 6^{6}
3 | (Germany) P Baur | 5 | 6 | 5
(United States) B Shelton | 7 | 1 | 7
WC | (United States) J Stark | 6 | 6
WC | (United States) B Steel | 4 | 1
Q | (United States) B Garnett | 2 | 4
(United States) J Kriek | 6 | 6
(Australia) S Youl | 1 | 6 | 3
5 | (South Africa) C van Rensburg | 6 | 3 | 6

Second round
1 | (Sweden) P Lundgren | 5 | 6 | 3
(United States) T Martin | 7 | 2 | 6
(Canada) M Wostenholme | 6 | 6
(United States) P Annacone | 4 | 4
(United States) B Shelton | 6 | 6
WC | (United States) J Stark | 4 | 4
(United States) J Kriek | 1 | 6 | 6^{5}
5 | (South Africa) C van Rensburg | 6 | 4 | 7^{7}

Quarterfinals
(United States) T Martin | 6 | 6
(Canada) M Wostenholme | 1 | 1
(United States) B Shelton | 6 | 4 | 6
5 | (South Africa) C van Rensburg | 4 | 6 | 3

Semifinals
(United States) T Martin | 5 | 4
(United States) B Shelton | 7 | 6

=== Bottom half ===
First round
6 | (United States) D Goldie | 7 | 3 | 4
(Italy) G Pozzi | 5 | 6 | 6
(Argentina) D Orsanic | 6^{2} | 3
(Australia) M Kratzmann | 7^{7} | 6
(United States) A Reichel | 7^{7} | 1 | 7
(United States) F Montana | 6^{4} | 6 | 5
Q | (United States) K Evans | 3 | 6^{0}
4 | (Netherlands) J Eltingh | 6 | 7^{7}
7 | (Argentina) J Frana | 7 | 6
Q | (United States) T Mercer | 5 | 2
WC | (United States) J Palmer | 6 | 7^{8}
(New Zealand) B Steven | 2 | 6^{6}
(United States) G Layendecker | 1 | 7^{7} | 7^{14}
(Australia) J Morgan | 6 | 6^{5} | 6^{12}
(Australia) N Borwick | 3 | 5
2 | (Germany) C Saceanu | 6 | 7

Second round
(Italy) G Pozzi | 4 | 6 | 4
(Australia) M Kratzmann | 6 | 4 | 6
(United States) A Reichel | 3 | 2
4 | (Netherlands) J Eltingh | 6 | 6
7 | (Argentina) J Frana | 6 | 6
WC | (United States) J Palmer | 1 | 3
(United States) G Layendecker | 6 | 6
2 | (Germany) C Saceanu | 1 | 3

Quarterfinals
(Australia) M Kratzmann | 6 | 6^{3} | 6
4 | (Netherlands) J Eltingh | 4 | 7^{7} | 4
7 | (Argentina) J Frana | 6 | 6
(United States) G Layendecker | 3 | 4

Semifinals
(Australia) M Kratzmann | 2 | 6 | 5
7 | (Argentina) J Frana | 6 | 4 | 7
