= 1994 Hall of Fame Tennis Championships =

- Date: July 4–10
- Edition: 21st
- Category: World Series
- Draw: 32S / 16D
- Prize money: $215,000
- Surface: Grass / outdoor
- Location: Newport, Rhode Island, U.S.
- Venue: Newport Casino

Champions

Singles
- (United States) David Wheaton

Doubles
- (Austria) Alex Antonitsch / (Canada) Greg Rusedski
← 1993 ·	Hall of Fame Open	· 1995 →

The 1994 Hall of Fame Tennis Championships, also known by its sponsored name Miller Lite Hall of Fame Tennis Championships, was a men's tennis tournament played on outdoor grass courts at the Newport Casino in Newport, Rhode Island, United States that was part of the World Series of the 1994 ATP Tour. It was the 21st edition of the tournament and was held from July 4 through July 10, 1994 Unseeded David Wheaton won the singles title.

== Finals ==
=== Singles ===
(United States) David Wheaton defeated (Australia) Todd Woodbridge 6–4, 3–6, 7–6^{(7–5)}

- It was Wheaton's 1st singles title of the year and the 3rd of his career.

=== Doubles ===
(Austria) Alex Antonitsch / (Canada) Greg Rusedski defeated (United States) Kent Kinnear / (United States) David Wheaton 6–4, 3–6, 6–4
