= 1992 French Open – Men's doubles =

Men's doubles
- 1992 French Open

Final
- Champion: (Switzerland) Jakob Hlasek (Switzerland) Marc Rosset
- Runner-up: (South Africa) David Adams (Commonwealth of Independent States) Andrei Olhovskiy
- Score: 7–6, 6–7, 7–5

Details
- Draw: 64
- Seeds: 16

Events
| Singles | men | women | | boys | girls |
| Doubles | men | women | mixed | boys | girls |
| WC Singles | men | women | quad |
| WC Doubles | men | women | quad |
| Legends | −45 | 45+ | women |
| ← 1991 · | French Open | · 1993 → |

The men's doubles competition at the 1992 French Open was held between 25 May and 7 June 1992 on the outdoor clay courts at the Stade Roland Garros in Paris, France. The unseeded team of Jakob Hlasek and Marc Rosset won the title, defeating David Adams and Andrei Olhovskiy in the final.

== Seeds ==
1. (Australia) John Fitzgerald / (Sweden) Anders Järryd (second round)
2. (Australia) Mark Woodforde / (Australia) Todd Woodbridge (third round)
3. (Canada) Grant Connell / (Canada) Glenn Michibata (second round)
4. (United States) Kelly Jones / (United States) Rick Leach (first round)
5. (Netherlands) Tom Nijssen / (Czechoslovakia) Cyril Suk (second round)
6. (United States) Scott Davis / (United States) David Pate (first round)
7. (United States) Ken Flach / (United States) Todd Witsken (second round)
8. (South Africa) Wayne Ferreira / (South Africa) Piet Norval (third round)
9. (United States) Jim Grabb / (United States) Richey Reneberg (quarterfinals)
10. (United States) Steve DeVries / (Australia) David Macpherson (second round)
11. (United States) Luke Jensen / (Australia) Laurie Warder (quarterfinals)
12. (Argentina) Javier Frana / (Mexico) Leonardo Lavalle (third round)
13. (Spain) Sergio Casal / (Spain) Emilio Sánchez (first round)
14. (United States) Kent Kinnear / (United States) Sven Salumaa (second round)
15. (United States) Patrick Galbraith / (United States) Patrick McEnroe (third round)
16. (Australia) Mark Kratzmann / (Australia) Wally Masur (semifinals)

== Draw ==
=== Key ===
- Q = Qualifier
- WC = Wild card
- LL = Lucky loser
- Alt = Alternate
- ITF = ITF entry
- PR = Protected ranking
- SR = Special ranking
- SE = Special exempt
- JE = Junior exempt
- JR = Junior Accelerator Programme entrant
- CO = College Accelerator Programme entrant
- NG = Next Gen Accelerator Program entrant
- w/o = Walkover
- r = Retired
- d = Defaulted

=== Finals ===
Quarterfinals
(Argentina) Pablo Albano (Brazil) Cássio Motta | 6 | 7
(United States) Andre Agassi (United States) John McEnroe | 4 | 6
(South Africa) David Adams (Commonwealth of Independent States) Andrei Olhovskiy | 6 | 6
11 | (United States) Luke Jensen (Australia) Laurie Warder | 2 | 3
(Switzerland) Jakob Hlasek (Switzerland) Marc Rosset | 6 | 6
(Czechoslovakia) Petr Korda (United States) Jim Pugh | 0 | 4
9 | (United States) Jim Grabb (United States) Richey Reneberg | 0 | 3
16 | (Australia) Mark Kratzmann (Australia) Wally Masur | 6 | 6

Semifinals
(Argentina) Pablo Albano (Brazil) Cássio Motta | 4 | 7 | 3
(South Africa) David Adams (Commonwealth of Independent States) Andrei Olhovskiy | 6 | 6 | 6
(Switzerland) Jakob Hlasek (Switzerland) Marc Rosset | 6 | 6 | 9
16 | (Australia) Mark Kratzmann (Australia) Wally Masur | 7 | 4 | 7

Final
(South Africa) David Adams (Commonwealth of Independent States) Andrei Olhovskiy | 6 | 7 | 5
(Switzerland) Jakob Hlasek (Switzerland) Marc Rosset | 7 | 6 | 7

=== Top half ===
==== Section 1 ====
First round
1 | (Australia) J Fitzgerald (Sweden) A Järryd | 6 | 6
(Netherlands) M Schapers (Czechoslovakia) D Vacek | 3 | 3
(United States) K Curren (South Africa) C van Rensburg | 3 | 4
(Argentina) P Albano (Brazil) C Motta | 6 | 6
(United Kingdom) J Bates (United Kingdom) N Broad | 6 | 3 | 6
(Germany) M-K Goellner (Italy) G Pozzi | 4 | 6 | 3
(Ecuador) A Gómez (Spain) J Sánchez | 6 | 6 | 6
15 | (United States) P Galbraith (United States) P McEnroe | 7 | 3 | 4
10 | (United States) S DeVries (Australia) D Macpherson | 4 | 6 | 6
(France) A Boetsch (France) J-P Fleurian | 6 | 4 | 3
(United States) A Agassi (United States) J McEnroe | 6 | 6
(United States) T Nelson (Australia) J Stoltenberg | 3 | 2
(Netherlands) M Oosting (Netherlands) J Siemerink | 2 | 3
(United States) M Briggs (United States) T Kronemann | 6 | 6
(France) C Pioline (France) G Raoux | 4 | 4
7 | (United States) K Flach (United States) T Witsken | 6 | 6

Second round
1 | (Australia) J Fitzgerald (Sweden) A Järryd | 6 | 7 | 5
(Argentina) P Albano (Brazil) C Motta | 7 | 5 | 7
(United Kingdom) J Bates (United Kingdom) N Broad | 5 | 5
15 | (United States) P Galbraith (United States) P McEnroe | 7 | 7
10 | (United States) S DeVries (Australia) D Macpherson | 4 | 5
(United States) A Agassi (United States) J McEnroe | 6 | 7
(United States) M Briggs (United States) T Kronemann | 7 | 7
7 | (United States) K Flach (United States) T Witsken | 6 | 6

Third round
(Argentina) P Albano (Brazil) C Motta | 6 | 7
15 | (United States) P Galbraith (United States) P McEnroe | 4 | 6
(United States) A Agassi (United States) J McEnroe | 6 | 6
7 | (United States) M Briggs (United States) T Kronemann | 2 | 1

Quarterfinals
(Argentina) P Albano (Brazil) C Motta | 6 | 7
(United States) A Agassi (United States) J McEnroe | 4 | 6

==== Section 2 ====
First round
4 | (United States) K Jones (United States) R Leach | 6 | 5
(South Africa) P Aldrich (South Africa) D Visser | 7 | 7
(South Africa) D Adams (Commonwealth of Independent States) A Olhovskiy | 4 | 7 | 6
(Italy) O Camporese (Croatia) G Ivanišević | 6 | 6 | 1
(Italy) D Nargiso (Germany) U Riglewski | 6 | 2
(Australia) B Dyke (Sweden) P Lundgren | 7 | 6
(Netherlands) P Haarhuis (Netherlands) M Koevermans | 7 | 3 | 6
14 | (United States) K Kinnear (United States) S Salumaa | 5 | 6 | 8
11 | (United States) L Jensen (Australia) L Warder | 6 | 3 | 9
(Sweden) R Båthman (Sweden) R Bergh | 4 | 6 | 7
(Australia) N Borwick (Australia) S Youl | 6 | 3
(France) G Forget (France) H Leconte | 7 | 6
(Sweden) O Jonsson (Finland) O Rahnasto | 3 | 4
(United States) B Garnett (Sweden) T Svantesson | 6 | 6
(Brazil) L Mattar (Brazil) J Oncins | 6 | 3 | 4
5 | (Netherlands) T Nijssen (Czechoslovakia) C Suk | 4 | 6 | 6

Second round
(South Africa) P Aldrich (South Africa) D Visser | 4 | 6 | 4
(South Africa) D Adams (Commonwealth of Independent States) A Olhovskiy | 6 | 4 | 6
(Australia) B Dyke (Sweden) P Lundgren | 4 | 7 | 3
14 | (United States) K Kinnear (United States) S Salumaa | 6 | 6 | 6
11 | (United States) L Jensen (Australia) L Warder | 7 | 6
(France) G Forget (France) H Leconte | 6 | 4
(United States) B Garnett (Sweden) T Svantesson | 7 | 6
5 | (Netherlands) T Nijssen (Czechoslovakia) C Suk | 6 | 1

Third round
(South Africa) D Adams (Commonwealth of Independent States) A Olhovskiy | 6 | 6 | 7
(Australia) B Dyke (Sweden) P Lundgren | 7 | 3 | 5
11 | (United States) L Jensen (Australia) L Warder | 7 | 6
(United States) B Garnett (Sweden) T Svantesson | 6 | 2

Quarterfinals
(South Africa) D Adams (Commonwealth of Independent States) A Olhovskiy | 6 | 6
11 | (United States) L Jensen (Australia) L Warder | 2 | 3

=== Bottom half ===
==== Section 3 ====
First round
6 | (United States) S Davis (United States) D Pate | 6 | 2 | 12
(Switzerland) J Hlasek (Switzerland) M Rosset | 3 | 6 | 14
(United States) M Keil (United States) D Randall | 2 | 7 | 2
(United States) C Beckman (United States) J Brown | 6 | 5 | 6
(Australia) C Limberger (Czechoslovakia) T Anzari | 1 | 6 | 6
(Czechoslovakia) M Damm (Czechoslovakia) D Rikl | 6 | 4 | 3
(Netherlands) HJ Davids (Belgium) L Pimek | 3 | 1
12 | (Argentina) J Frana (Mexico) L Lavalle | 6 | 6
13 | (Spain) S Casal (Spain) E Sánchez | 3 | 3
(Czechoslovakia) P Korda (United States) J Pugh | 6 | 6
(United States) S Cannon (United States) G Van Emburgh | 6 | 6 | 7
(Czechoslovakia) V Flégl (Germany) D Prinosil | 4 | 7 | 9
(Spain) T Carbonell (Spain) F Roig | 3 | 6 | 6
(United States) F Montana (United States) K Thorne | 6 | 3 | 4
(France) T Champion (France) F Santoro | 1 | 4
3 | (Canada) G Connell (Canada) G Michibata | 6 | 6

Second round
(Switzerland) J Hlasek (Switzerland) M Rosset | 6 | 7
(United States) C Beckman (United States) J Brown | 2 | 5
(Australia) C Limberger (Czechoslovakia) T Anzari | 4 | 3
12 | (Argentina) J Frana (Mexico) L Lavalle | 6 | 6
(Czechoslovakia) P Korda (United States) J Pugh | 6 | 6
(Czechoslovakia) V Flégl (Germany) D Prinosil | 2 | 4
(Spain) T Carbonell (Spain) F Roig | 7 | 6
3 | (Canada) G Connell (Canada) G Michibata | 5 | 3

Third round
(Switzerland) J Hlasek (Switzerland) M Rosset | 6 | 6 | 6
12 | (Argentina) J Frana (Mexico) L Lavalle | 3 | 7 | 4
(Czechoslovakia) P Korda (United States) J Pugh | 4 | 6 | 6
(Spain) T Carbonell (Spain) F Roig | 6 | 4 | 1

Quarterfinals
(Switzerland) J Hlasek (Switzerland) M Rosset | 6 | 6
(Czechoslovakia) P Korda (United States) J Pugh | 0 | 4

==== Section 4 ====
First round
8 | (South Africa) W Ferreira (South Africa) P Norval | 7 | 7
(Israel) G Bloom (Kenya) P Wekesa | 6 | 6
(United States) B Shelton (Australia) S Stolle | 6 | 6
(South Africa) S Kruger (United States) G Layendecker | 7 | 7
(Zimbabwe) B Black (New Zealand) K Evernden | 4 | 5
(France) O Delaître (France) R Gilbert | 6 | 7
(Argentina) C Miniussi (Uruguay) D Pérez | 4 | 6 | 4
9 | (United States) J Grabb (United States) R Reneberg | 6 | 1 | 6
16 | (Australia) M Kratzmann (Australia) W Masur | 7 | 5 | 6
(Czechoslovakia) K Nováček (Croatia) G Prpić | 6 | 7 | 4
(Netherlands) J Eltingh (Netherlands) T Kempers | 6 | 7
(Brazil) R Acioly (Brazil) M Menezes | 4 | 5
(United States) J Palmer (United States) D Wheaton | 2 | 5
(United States) B Pearce (South Africa) B Talbot | 6 | 7
(Spain) F Clavet (Mexico) J Lozano | 3 | 2
2 | (Australia) M Woodforde (Australia) T Woodbridge | 6 | 6

Second round
8 | (South Africa) W Ferreira (South Africa) P Norval | 7 | 6
(South Africa) S Kruger (United States) G Layendecker | 6 | 4
(France) O Delaître (France) R Gilbert | 1 | 6
9 | (United States) J Grabb (United States) R Reneberg | 6 | 7
16 | (Australia) M Kratzmann (Australia) W Masur | 6 | 6 | 6
(Netherlands) J Eltingh (Netherlands) T Kempers | 7 | 4 | 4
(United States) B Pearce (South Africa) B Talbot | 2 | 7 | 4
2 | (Australia) M Woodforde (Australia) T Woodbridge | 6 | 6 | 6

Third round
8 | (South Africa) W Ferreira (South Africa) P Norval | 3 | 6 | 4
9 | (United States) J Grabb (United States) R Reneberg | 6 | 3 | 6
16 | (Australia) M Kratzmann (Australia) W Masur | 6 | 4 | 6
2 | (Australia) M Woodforde (Australia) T Woodbridge | 4 | 6 | 3

Quarterfinals
9 | (United States) J Grabb (United States) R Reneberg | 0 | 3
16 | (Australia) M Kratzmann (Australia) W Masur | 6 | 6
