= 1991 Miller Lite Hall of Fame Tennis Championships =

- Date: July 8–14
- Edition: 18th
- Category: World Series
- Draw: 32S / 16D
- Prize money: $150,000
- Surface: Grass / outdoor
- Location: Newport, Rhode Island, U.S.
- Venue: Newport Casino

Champions

Singles
- (United States) Bryan Shelton

Doubles
- (Italy) Gianluca Pozzi / (New Zealand) Brett Steven
- Hall of Fame Open

The 1991 Miller Lite Hall of Fame Tennis Championships, was a men's tennis tournament played on outdoor grass courts at the Newport Casino in Newport, Rhode Island, United States that was part of the World Series of the 1991 ATP Tour. It was the 18th edition of the tournament and was held from July 8 through July 14, 1991. Unseeded Bryan Shelton won the singles title.

== Finals ==
=== Singles ===
(United States) Bryan Shelton defeated (Argentina) Javier Frana 3–6, 6–4, 6–4

- It was Shelton's first singles title of his career.

=== Doubles ===
(Italy) Gianluca Pozzi / (New Zealand) Brett Steven defeated (Argentina) Javier Frana / (United States) Bruce Steel 6–4, 6–4
