= 1993 Miller Lite Hall of Fame Tennis Championships – Doubles =

Doubles
- 1993 Miller Lite Hall of Fame Tennis Championships

Final
- Champions: (Argentina) Javier Frana (South Africa) Christo van Rensburg
- Runners-up: (Zimbabwe) Byron Black (United States) Jim Pugh
- Score: 4–6, 6–1, 7–6

Details
- Draw: 16 (2WC/1Q)
- Seeds: 4

Events
Singles	Doubles
- Hall of Fame Open

Royce Deppe and David Rikl were the defending champions, but Rikl chose to compete at the Eisenach Challenger during the same week. Deppe teamed up with Lan Bale and lost in the quarterfinals to Byron Black and Jim Pugh.

Javier Frana and Christo van Rensburg won the title by defeating Black and Pugh 4–6, 6–1, 7–6 in the final.

== Seeds ==
1. (United States) Luke Jensen / (United States) Bryan Shelton (first round)
2. (Argentina) Javier Frana / (South Africa) Christo van Rensburg (champions)
3. (United States) Bret Garnett / (United States) Kenny Thorne (quarterfinals)
4. (Zimbabwe) Byron Black / (United States) Jim Pugh (final)

== Draw ==
Key

- Q = Qualifier
- WC = Wild card
- LL = Lucky loser
- Alt = Alternate
- ITF = ITF entry
- PR = Protected ranking
- SR = Special ranking
- SE = Special exempt
- JE = Junior exempt
- JR = Junior Accelerator Programme entrant
- CO = College Accelerator Programme entrant
- NG = Next Gen Accelerator Program entrant
- w/o = Walkover
- r = Retired
- d = Defaulted

=== Draw ===
First round
1	(United States) L Jensen (The Bahamas) B Shelton	3	4
Q	(United States) D Flach (United States) D Witt	6	6
(Venezuela) M Ruah (The Bahamas) R Smith	6	6
(Germany) P Baur (United States) M Keil	2	3
4	(Zimbabwe) B Black (United States) J Pugh	6	7	6
(Australia) N Borwick (Australia) P Rafter	7	5	1
(South Africa) L Bale (South Africa) R Deppe	6	6
(Venezuela) N Pereira (Germany) C Saceanu	4	4
(Australia) G Doyle (Italy) L Tieleman	4	6
WC	(United States) D DiLucia (United States) B MacPhie	6	7
(Austria) A Antonitsch (United States) R Schmidt	2	6	6
3	(United States) B Garnett (United States) K Thorne	6	1	7
WC	(Mexico) L Herrera (United States) T Witsken	4	2
(Australia) A Kratzmann (Australia) S Stolle	6	6
(Netherlands) S Groen (Germany) A Thoms	7	3	6
2	(Argentina) J Frana (South Africa) C van Rensburg	6	6	7

Quarterfinals
Q	(United States) D Flach (United States) D Witt	7	7
(Venezuela) M Ruah (The Bahamas) R Smith	6	5
4	(Zimbabwe) B Black (United States) J Pugh	6	6
(South Africa) L Bale (South Africa) R Deppe	4	4
WC	(United States) D DiLucia (United States) B MacPhie	6	7	7
3	(United States) B Garnett (United States) K Thorne	7	6	6
(Australia) A Kratzmann (Australia) S Stolle	4	4
2	(Argentina) J Frana (South Africa) C van Rensburg	6	6

Semifinals
Q	(United States) D Flach (United States) D Witt	6	1
4	(Zimbabwe) B Black (United States) J Pugh	7	6
WC	(United States) D DiLucia (United States) B MacPhie	4	2
2	(Argentina) J Frana (South Africa) C van Rensburg	6	6

Final
4	(Zimbabwe) B Black (United States) J Pugh	6	1	6
2	(Argentina) J Frana (South Africa) C van Rensburg	4	6	7
