= 1993 Miller Lite Hall of Fame Tennis Championships – Singles =

Singles
- 1993 Miller Lite Hall of Fame Tennis Championships

Final
- Champion: (Canada) Greg Rusedski
- Runner-up: (Argentina) Javier Frana
- Score: 7–5, 6–7^{(7–9)}, 7–6^{(7–5)}

Details
- Draw: 32 (3WC/4Q)
- Seeds: 8

Events
Singles	Doubles
- Hall of Fame Open

Bryan Shelton was the two-time defending champion, but lost in the first round to Shuzo Matsuoka.

Greg Rusedski won the title by defeating Javier Frana 7–5, 6–7^{(7–9)}, 7–6^{(7–5)} in the final.

== Seeds ==
1. (United States) Bryan Shelton (first round)
2. (Mexico) Luis Herrera (semifinals)
3. (Argentina) Javier Frana (final)
4. (South Africa) Grant Stafford (quarterfinals)
5. (Austria) Alex Antonitsch (semifinals)
6. (Zimbabwe) Byron Black (second round)
7. (Venezuela) Nicolás Pereira (first round)
8. (United States) Richard Matuszewski (first round, retired)

== Draw ==
Key

- Q = Qualifier
- WC = Wild card
- LL = Lucky loser
- Alt = Alternate
- ITF = ITF entry
- PR = Protected ranking
- SR = Special ranking
- SE = Special exempt
- JE = Junior exempt
- JR = Junior Accelerator Programme entrant
- CO = College Accelerator Programme entrant
- NG = Next Gen Accelerator Program entrant
- w/o = Walkover
- r = Retired
- d = Defaulted

=== Finals ===
Semifinals
(Canada) Greg Rusedski	7^{7}	6^{2}	7^{7}
5	(Austria) Alex Antonitsch	6^{4}	7^{7}	6^{5}
3	(Argentina) Javier Frana	6	6
2	(Mexico) Luis Herrera	3	1

Final
(Canada) Greg Rusedski	7	6^{7}	7^{7}
3	(Argentina) Javier Frana	5	7^{9}	6^{5}

=== Top half ===
First round
1	(United States) B Shelton	4	6	6^{3}
(Japan) S Matsuoka	6	3	7^{7}
(Venezuela) M Ruah	7^{7}	6
(United States) C Garner	6^{4}	1
(United States) R Weiss	3	6^{7}
(Canada) G Rusedski	6	7^{9}
(Italy) L Tieleman	2
8	(United States) R Matuszewski	1^{r}
4	(South Africa) G Stafford	6	4	6
(Israel) G Bloom	3	6	3
Q	(United States) L Gloria	4	2
(Australia) P Rafter	6	6
(Germany) C Saceanu	5	4
(Germany) P Baur	7	6
(Australia) N Borwick	7^{11}	3	6^{3}
5	(Austria) A Antonitsch	6^{9}	6	7^{7}

Second round
(Japan) S Matsuoka	6	6
(Venezuela) M Ruah	1	4
(Canada) G Rusedski	7^{7}	3	6
(Italy) L Tieleman	6^{4}	6	3
4	(South Africa) G Stafford	6	6
(Australia) P Rafter	2	3
(Germany) P Baur	3	2
5	(Austria) A Antonitsch	6	6

Quarterfinals
(Japan) S Matsuoka	7^{7}	4	4
(Canada) G Rusedski	6^{1}	6	6
4	(South Africa) G Stafford	4	6	1
5	(Austria) A Antonitsch	6	4	6

Semifinals
(Canada) G Rusedski	7^{7}	6^{2}	7^{7}
5	(Austria) A Antonitsch	6^{4}	7^{7}	6^{5}

=== Bottom half ===
First round
6	(Zimbabwe) B Black	6	6
(United States) K Thorne	3	2
WC	(United States) B MacPhie	4	7	6
Q	(Australia) G Doyle	6	5	4
WC	(United States) L Jensen	6^{4}	3
(South Africa) C van Rensburg	7^{7}	6
Q	(United States) R Schmidt	3	4
3	(Argentina) J Frana	6	6
7	(Venezuela) N Pereira	2	3
(Australia) S Stolle	6	6
Q	(Netherlands) S Groen	4	3
(Germany) A Thoms	6	6
WC	(United States) D Witt	6	6
(United States) T Witsken	3	4
(Colombia) M Hadad	6	5	3
2	(Mexico) L Herrera	3	7	6

Second round
6	(Zimbabwe) B Black	3	6^{4}
WC	(United States) B MacPhie	6	7^{7}
(South Africa) C van Rensburg	4	1
3	(Argentina) J Frana	6	6
(Australia) S Stolle	6^{7}	7	3
(Germany) A Thoms	7^{9}	5	6
WC	(United States) D Witt	4	4
2	(Mexico) L Herrera	6	6

Quarterfinals
WC	(United States) B MacPhie	7^{7}	4	3
3	(Argentina) J Frana	6^{2}	6	6
(Germany) A Thoms	6^{5}	7^{7}	0
2	(Mexico) L Herrera	7^{7}	6^{5}	6

Semifinals
3	(Argentina) J Frana	6	6
2	(Mexico) L Herrera	3	1
