= 1992 French Open – Mixed doubles =

Mixed doubles
- 1992 French Open

Final
- Champion: (Spain) Arantxa Sánchez Vicario (Australia) Todd Woodbridge
- Runner-up: (United States) Lori McNeil (United States) Bryan Shelton
- Score: 6–2, 6–3

Details
- Draw: 48
- Seeds: 16

Events
Singles	men	women		boys	girls
Doubles	men	women	mixed	boys	girls
WC Singles	men	women	quad
WC Doubles	men	women	quad
Legends	−45	45+	women
- French Open

The mixed doubles competition at the 1992 French Open was held between May 25 and June 7, 1992, on the outdoor clay courts at the Stade Roland Garros in Paris, France. Arantxa Sánchez Vicario and Todd Woodbridge won the title, defeating Lori McNeil and Bryan Shelton in the final.

== Seeds ==
1. (Czechoslovakia) Jana Novotná / (Australia) John Fitzgerald (second round)
2. (Spain) Arantxa Sánchez Vicario / (Australia) Todd Woodbridge (champions)
3. (Latvia) Larisa Neiland / (Czechoslovakia) Cyril Suk (quarterfinals)
4. (Australia) Nicole Provis / (Australia) Mark Woodforde (semifinals)
5. (United States) Gigi Fernández / (United States) Kelly Jones (second round)
6. (Netherlands) Manon Bollegraf / (Netherlands) Tom Nijssen (semifinals)
7. (Canada) Jill Hetherington / (Canada) Glenn Michibata (quarterfinals)
8. (United States) Kathy Rinaldi / (United States) Rick Leach (third round)
9. (United States) Katrina Adams / (United States) Todd Witsken (third round)
10. (United States) Patty Fendick / (United States) Steve DeVries (third round)
11. (United States) Sandy Collins / (South Africa) Piet Norval (second round)
12. (Argentina) Mercedes Paz / (Australia) David Macpherson (third round)
13. (Commonwealth of Independent States) Natasha Zvereva / (Australia) Mark Kratzmann (quarterfinals)
14. (Australia) Rennae Stubbs / (Australia) Laurie Warder (third round)
15. (South Africa) Elna Reinach / (South Africa) Danie Visser (second round)
16. (France) Isabelle Demongeot / (South Africa) Byron Talbot (second round)

== Draw ==
Key

- Q = Qualifier
- WC = Wild card
- LL = Lucky loser
- Alt = Alternate
- ITF = ITF entry
- PR = Protected ranking
- SR = Special ranking
- SE = Special exempt
- JE = Junior exempt
- JR = Junior Accelerator Programme entrant
- CO = College Accelerator Programme entrant
- NG = Next Gen Accelerator Program entrant
- w/o = Walkover
- r = Retired
- d = Defaulted

=== Finals ===
Quarterfinals
(United States) Lori McNeil (United States) Bryan Shelton	6	6
7	(Canada) Jill Hetherington (Canada) Glenn Michibata	4	4
3	(Latvia) Larisa Neiland (Czechoslovakia) Cyril Suk	6	3	4
6	(Netherlands) Manon Bollegraf (Netherlands) Tom Nijssen	4	6	6
(France) Mary Pierce (United States) Jared Palmer	3	7	3
4	(Australia) Nicole Provis (Australia) Mark Woodforde	6	5	6
13	(Commonwealth of Independent States) Natasha Zvereva (Australia) Mark Kratzmann	3	6	2
2	(Spain) Arantxa Sánchez Vicario (Australia) Todd Woodbridge	6	4	6

Semifinals
(United States) Lori McNeil (United States) Bryan Shelton	6	6
6	(Netherlands) Manon Bollegraf (Netherlands) Tom Nijssen	3	3
4	(Australia) Nicole Provis (Australia) Mark Woodforde	3	3
2	(Spain) Arantxa Sánchez Vicario (Australia) Todd Woodbridge	6	6

Final
(United States) Lori McNeil (United States) Bryan Shelton	2	3
2	(Spain) Arantxa Sánchez Vicario (Australia) Todd Woodbridge	6	6

=== Top half ===
==== Section 1 ====
First round
(United States) L McNeil (United States) B Shelton	2	7	6
(Netherlands) C Vis (Netherlands) T Kempers	6	5	3
(Commonwealth of Independent States) L Meskhi (Latvia) Ģ Dzelde	3	7^{7}	7
(Germany) W Probst (United States) D Randall	6	6^{5}	5
(Netherlands) M Oremans (Netherlands) J Eltingh	7	6
(Argentina) P Tarabini (Argentina) P Albano	5	4
(Argentina) F Labat (Argentina) J Frana	6	6
(United States) L Harvey-Wild (United States) K Flach	2	2

Second round
1	(Czechoslovakia) J Novotná (Australia) J Fitzgerald	6^{5}	3
(United States) L McNeil (United States) B Shelton	7^{7}	6
(Commonwealth of Independent States) L Meskhi (Latvia) Ģ Dzelde	2	5
10	(United States) P Fendick (United States) S DeVries	6	7
14	(Australia) R Stubbs (Australia) L Warder	7^{7}	7
(Netherlands) M Oremans (Netherlands) J Eltingh	6^{3}	5
(Argentina) F Labat (Argentina) J Frana	5	3
7	(Canada) J Hetherington (Canada) G Michibata	7	6

Third round
(United States) L McNeil (United States) B Shelton	6^{2}	7^{7}	6
10	(United States) P Fendick (United States) S DeVries	7^{7}	6^{5}	4
14	(Australia) R Stubbs (Australia) L Warder	7	6^{4}	1
7	(Canada) J Hetherington (Canada) G Michibata	6	7^{7}	6

Quarterfinals
(United States) L McNeil (United States) B Shelton	6	6
7	(Canada) J Hetherington (Canada) G Michibata	4	4

==== Section 2 ====
First round
(United States) T Whitlinger (United States) P Galbraith	6	6
(France) N Housset (France) G Raoux	4	2
(United States) C Benjamin (United States) K Kinnear	3	2
(United Kingdom) C Wood (United States) C Beckman	6	6
(Australia) J-A Faull (United States) S Salumaa	6	7^{8}
(United States) B Bowes (United States) B Pearce	3	6^{6}
(Czechoslovakia) P Langrová (Belgium) L Pimek	6	6
(United States) L Field (Netherlands) M Oosting	4	3

Second round
3	(Latvia) L Neiland (Czechoslovakia) C Suk	6	6
(United States) T Whitlinger (United States) P Galbraith	2	2
(United Kingdom) C Wood (United States) C Beckman	6	6
11	(United States) S Collins (South Africa) P Norval	2	1
16	(France) I Demongeot (South Africa) B Talbot	4	6	1
(Australia) J-A Faull (United States) S Salumaa	6	3	6
(Czechoslovakia) P Langrová (Belgium) L Pimek	3	2
6	(Netherlands) M Bollegraf (Netherlands) T Nijssen	6	6

Third round
3	(Latvia) L Neiland (Czechoslovakia) C Suk	6^{6}	6	6
(United Kingdom) C Wood (United States) C Beckman	7^{8}	2	3
(Australia) J-A Faull (United States) S Salumaa	2	4
6	(Netherlands) M Bollegraf (Netherlands) T Nijssen	6	6

Quarterfinals
3	(Latvia) L Neiland (Czechoslovakia) C Suk	6	3	4
6	(Netherlands) M Bollegraf (Netherlands) T Nijssen	4	6	6

=== Bottom half ===
==== Section 3 ====
First round
(Netherlands) B Schultz (Netherlands) M Schapers	6^{6}	6	3
WC	(France) M Pierce (United States) J Palmer	7^{8}	3	6
(United States) C Cunningham (United States) L Jensen	3	6^{1}
(South Africa) R Fairbank-Nideffer (South Africa) P Aldrich	6	7^{7}
(Czechoslovakia) A Strnadová (Australia) J Stoltenberg	5	3
(Argentina) G Sabatini (Brazil) C Motta	7	6
(Australia) M Jaggard-Lai (Sweden) R Bergh	3	6	5
(France) C Suire (Sweden) R Båthman	6	4	7

Second round
5	(United States) G Fernández (United States) K Jones	4	6^{3}
WC	(France) M Pierce (United States) J Palmer	6	7^{7}
(South Africa) R Fairbank-Nideffer (South Africa) P Aldrich	4	2
9	(United States) K Adams (United States) T Witsken	6	6
12	(Argentina) M Paz (Australia) D Macpherson	7^{7}	7
(Argentina) G Sabatini (Brazil) C Motta	6^{4}	5
(France) C Suire (Sweden) R Båthman
4	(Australia) N Provis (Australia) M Woodforde	d

Third round
WC	(France) M Pierce (United States) J Palmer	6	6^{7}	6
9	(United States) K Adams (United States) T Witsken	2	7^{9}	4
12	(Argentina) M Paz (Australia) D Macpherson	4	4
4	(Australia) N Provis (Australia) M Woodforde	6	6

Quarterfinals
WC	(France) M Pierce (United States) J Palmer	3	7	3
4	(Australia) N Provis (Australia) M Woodforde	6	5	6

==== Section 4 ====
First round
WC	(France) S Testud (France) S Simian	4	4
(Bulgaria) M Maleeva (Mexico) L Lavalle	6	6
(United States) A Frazier (United States) T Kronemann	6	6
WC	(France) N Herreman (Iran) M Bahrami	2	4
(United States) S Stafford (United States) J Brown	6	2	2
(Germany) C Porwik (Czechoslovakia) D Vacek	1	6	6
(France) N van Lottum (Netherlands) HJ Davids	6	1	4
(Commonwealth of Independent States) N Medvedeva (Mexico) J Lozano	2	6	6

Second round
8	(United States) K Rinaldi (United States) R Leach	4	7	8
(Bulgaria) M Maleeva (Mexico) L Lavalle	6	5	6
(United States) A Frazier (United States) T Kronemann	6^{6}	3
13	(Commonwealth of Independent States) N Zvereva (Australia) M Kratzmann	7^{8}	6
15	(South Africa) E Reinach (South Africa) D Visser	7^{8}	6^{3}	7
(Germany) C Porwik (Czechoslovakia) D Vacek	6^{6}	7^{7}	9
(Commonwealth of Independent States) N Medvedeva (Mexico) J Lozano	3	4
2	(Spain) A Sánchez Vicario (Australia) T Woodbridge	6	6

Third round
8	(United States) K Rinaldi (United States) R Leach	0	2
13	(Commonwealth of Independent States) N Zvereva (Australia) M Kratzmann	6	6
16	(Germany) C Porwik (Czechoslovakia) D Vacek	4	7^{7}	3
2	(Spain) A Sánchez Vicario (Australia) T Woodbridge	6	6^{5}	6

Quarterfinals
13	(Commonwealth of Independent States) N Zvereva (Australia) M Kratzmann	3	6	2
2	(Spain) A Sánchez Vicario (Australia) T Woodbridge	6	4	6
