= 1992 French Open =

- Date: 25 May – 7 June 1992
- Edition: 91
- Category: 62nd Grand Slam (ITF)
- Surface: Clay
- Location: Paris (XVI^{e}), France
- Venue: Stade Roland Garros

Champions

Men's singles
- (United States) Jim Courier

Women's singles
- (Federal Republic of Yugoslavia) Monica Seles

Men's doubles
- (Switzerland) Jakob Hlasek / (Switzerland) Marc Rosset

Women's doubles
- (United States) Gigi Fernández / (Commonwealth of Independent States) Natalia Zvereva

Mixed doubles
- (Spain) Arantxa Sánchez Vicario / (Australia) Mark Woodforde
← 1991 ·	French Open	· 1993 →

The 1992 French Open was a tennis tournament that took place on the outdoor clay courts at the Stade Roland Garros in Paris, France. The tournament was held from 25 May until 7 June. It was the 91st staging of the French Open, and the second Grand Slam tennis event of 1992. This was the last time both the top seeds won the men's singles and women's singles until the 2018 French Open.

== Seniors ==
=== Men's singles ===
(United States) Jim Courier defeated (Czechoslovakia) Petr Korda, 7–5, 6–2, 6–1

• It was Courier's 3rd career Grand Slam singles title and his 2nd and last title at the French Open. It was Courier's 5th title of the year, and his 9th overall.

=== Women's singles ===
(Federal Republic of Yugoslavia) Monica Seles defeated (Germany) Steffi Graf, 6–2, 3–6, 10–8

• It was Seles' 6th career Grand Slam singles title and her 3rd and last title at the French Open. It was Monica's 6th title of the year, and her 26th overall.

=== Men's doubles ===
(Switzerland) Jakob Hlasek / (Switzerland) Marc Rosset defeated (South Africa) David Adams / (Commonwealth of Independent States) Andrei Olhovskiy, 7–6, 6–7, 7–5

• It was Hlasek's 1st and only career Grand Slam doubles title.
• It was Rosset's 1st and only career Grand Slam doubles title.

=== Women's doubles ===
(United States) Gigi Fernández / (Commonwealth of Independent States) Natalia Zvereva defeated (Spain) Conchita Martínez / (Spain) Arantxa Sánchez Vicario, 6–3, 6–2

=== Mixed doubles ===
(Spain) Arantxa Sánchez Vicario / (Australia) Todd Woodbridge defeated (United States) Lori McNeil / (United States) Bryan Shelton, 6–2, 6–3

• It was Sánchez Vicario's 2nd career Grand Slam mixed doubles title and her 2nd and last title at the French Open.
• It was Woodbridge's 2nd career Grand Slam mixed doubles title and his 1st title at the French Open.

== Juniors ==
=== Boys' singles ===
(Romania) Andrei Pavel defeated (Italy) Mosé Navarra, 6–1, 3–6, 6–3

=== Girls' singles ===
(Paraguay) Rossana de los Ríos defeated (Argentina) Paola Suárez, 6–4, 6–0

=== Boys' doubles ===
(Mexico) Enrique Abaroa / (Australia) Grant Doyle

=== Girls' doubles ===
(Belgium) Laurence Courtois / (Belgium) Nancy Feber

== Prize money ==
Event		W	F	SF	QF	4R	3R	2R	1R
Singles	Men	FF2,680,000	FF1,340,000	FF670,000	FF350,000	FF189,000	FF109,000	FF67,000	FF40,000
Singles	Women	FF2,470,000	FF1,235,000	FF617,000	FF310,000	FF162,000	FF90,000	FF53,000	FF35,000

Total prize money for the event was FF41,425,000.

Preceded by 1992 Australian Open	Grand Slams	Succeeded by 1992 Wimbledon Championships
