= 1992 French Open – Men's singles =

Men's singles
- 1992 French Open

Final
- Champion: (United States) Jim Courier
- Runner-up: (Czechoslovakia) Petr Korda
- Score: 7–5, 6–2, 6–1

Details
- Draw: 128
- Seeds: 16

Events
Singles	men	women		boys	girls
Doubles	men	women	mixed	boys	girls
WC Singles	men	women	quad
WC Doubles	men	women	quad
Legends	−45	45+	women
← 1991 ·	French Open	· 1993 →

Defending champion Jim Courier defeated Petr Korda in the final, 7–5, 6–2, 6–1 to win the men's singles tennis title at the 1992 French Open. It was his second French Open title and third major title overall.

Stefan Edberg was attempting to complete the career Grand Slam, but lost to Andrei Cherkasov in the third round.

== Seeds ==
The seeded players are listed below. Jim Courier is the champion; others show the round in which they were eliminated.

1. (United States) Jim Courier (champion)
2. (Sweden) Stefan Edberg (third round)
3. (United States) Pete Sampras (quarterfinals)
4. (Germany) Michael Stich (third round)
5. (United States) Michael Chang (third round)
6. (France) Guy Forget (second round)
7. (Czechoslovakia) Petr Korda (finalist)
8. (Croatia) Goran Ivanišević (quarterfinals)
9. (Spain) Carlos Costa (fourth round)
10. (Czechoslovakia) Ivan Lendl (second round)
11. (United States) Andre Agassi (semifinals)
12. (Netherlands) Richard Krajicek (third round)
13. (United States) Aaron Krickstein (third round)
14. (Commonwealth of Independent States) Alexander Volkov (third round)
15. (United States) Brad Gilbert (first round)
16. (Switzerland) Jakob Hlasek (first round)

== Draw ==
=== Key ===
- Q = Qualifier
- WC = Wild card
- LL = Lucky loser
- Alt = Alternate
- ITF = ITF entry
- PR = Protected ranking
- SR = Special ranking
- SE = Special exempt
- JE = Junior exempt
- JR = Junior Accelerator Programme entrant
- CO = College Accelerator Programme entrant
- NG = Next Gen Accelerator Program entrant
- w/o = Walkover
- r = Retired
- d = Defaulted

=== Finals ===
Quarterfinals
1	(United States) Jim Courier	6	6	2	7
8	(Croatia) Goran Ivanišević	2	1	6	5
3	(United States) Pete Sampras	6^{6}	2	1
11	(United States) Andre Agassi	7^{8}	6	6
(Sweden) Nicklas Kulti	7^{10}	6	3	3	3
WC	(France) Henri Leconte	6^{8}	3	6	6	6
7	(Czechoslovakia) Petr Korda	6	6^{3}	6	6
(Commonwealth of Independent States) Andrei Cherkasov	4	7^{7}	2	4

Semifinals
1	(United States) Jim Courier	6	6	6
11	(United States) Andre Agassi	3	2	2
WC	(France) Henri Leconte	2	6^{4}	3
7	(Czechoslovakia) Petr Korda	6	7^{7}	6

Final
1	(United States) Jim Courier	7	6	6
7	(Czechoslovakia) Petr Korda	5	2	1

=== Top half ===
==== Section 1 ====
First round
1	(United States) J Courier	7^{7}	6	6
Q	(Sweden) N Kroon	6^{2}	4	2
Q	(Brazil) C Motta	4	4	7	2
(Austria) T Muster	6	6	5	6
(Israel) G Bloom	5	6	6	4	6
(Netherlands) J Siemerink	7	4	4	6	2
(Argentina) A Mancini	6	1	6	6^{6}	6
Q	(Spain) À Corretja	4	6	4	7^{8}	3
(France) A Boetsch	6	7	6^{3}	4	2
(Australia) T Woodbridge	4	5	7^{7}	6	6
(United States) D Rostagno	3	7	6	6^{6}	6
(Czechoslovakia) K Nováček	6	5	3	7^{8}	3
(United States) K Curren	6	6	6^{5}	6
(Argentina) G Pérez Roldán	2	4	7^{7}	3
Q	(Commonwealth of Independent States) A Medvedev	7^{8}	6	6
16	(Switzerland) J Hlasek	6^{6}	3	4

Second round
1	(United States) J Courier	6	6	6
(Austria) T Muster	1	4	4
(Israel) G Bloom	3	3	7	6^{4}
(Argentina) A Mancini	6	6	5	7^{7}
(Australia) T Woodbridge	4	7^{7}	6	6
(United States) D Rostagno	6	6^{5}	3	3
(United States) K Curren	4	6	1	3
Q	(Commonwealth of Independent States) A Medvedev	6	4	6	6

Third round
1	(United States) J Courier	6	6	6
(Argentina) A Mancini	4	2	0
(Australia) T Woodbridge	6^{5}	2	1
Q	(Commonwealth of Independent States) A Medvedev	7^{7}	6	6

Fourth round
1	(United States) J Courier	6	6	6
Q	(Commonwealth of Independent States) A Medvedev	1	4	2

==== Section 2 ====
First round
9	(Spain) C Costa	6	6	3	6
(Germany) K Braasch	1	0	6	3
Q	(Austria) G Schaller	1	7^{7}	5	7	9
(Peru) J Yzaga	6	6^{3}	7	5	7
(Germany) A Thoms	5	2	6^{4}
(South Africa) W Ferreira	7	6	7^{7}
(Germany) M Zoecke	4	4	5
(Australia) R Fromberg	6	6	7
(United States) D Wheaton	3	3	6	6	6
(Commonwealth of Independent States) A Chesnokov	6	6	4	0	2
Q	(Spain) A Berasategui	3	3	2
(Sweden) M Larsson	6	6	6
Q	(Australia) C Limberger	6	2	6	4	7
(France) T Champion	4	6	4	6	5
(Australia) S Youl	7^{8}	3	2	1
8	(Croatia) G Ivanišević	6^{6}	6	6	6

Second round
9	(Spain) C Costa	7^{9}	6	6
Q	(Austria) G Schaller	6^{7}	3	2
(South Africa) W Ferreira	6	7	6
(Australia) R Fromberg	3	5	4
(United States) D Wheaton	6^{2}	4	1
(Sweden) M Larsson	7^{7}	6	6
Q	(Australia) C Limberger	2	2	4
8	(Croatia) G Ivanišević	6	6	6

Third round
9	(Spain) C Costa	2	6	6	6
(South Africa) W Ferreira	6	2	2	2
(Sweden) M Larsson	7^{7}	3	1	6	7
8	(Croatia) G Ivanišević	6^{5}	6	6	3	9

Fourth round
9	(Spain) C Costa	3	6	1	1
8	(Croatia) G Ivanišević	6	4	6	6

==== Section 3 ====
First round
3	(United States) P Sampras	7^{7}	4	6	3	6
(Switzerland) M Rosset	6^{5}	6	4	6	3
(Zimbabwe) B Black	3	3	3
WC	(France) L Prades	6	6	6
(Argentina) H de la Peña	1	6	4	5
WC	(France) T Guardiola	6	1	6	7
(France) R Gilbert	7	4	6	7^{7}
WC	(France) G Raoux	5	6	3	6^{3}
(United States) B Shelton	6	3	4	6^{5}
(United States) P McEnroe	4	6	6	7^{7}
(Canada) G Connell	4	2	2
(Germany) C-U Steeb	6	6	6
(Australia) J Stoltenberg	6^{1}	6^{6}	3
(Germany) M Naewie	7^{7}	7^{8}	6
Q	(Czechoslovakia) M Vajda	6	6^{2}	1	6	5
14	(Commonwealth of Independent States) A Volkov	4	7^{7}	6	1	7

Second round
3	(United States) P Sampras	7^{8}	6	7^{7}
WC	(France) L Prades	6^{6}	4	6^{3}
WC	(France) T Guardiola	1	6^{2}	1
(France) R Gilbert	6	7^{7}	6
(United States) P McEnroe	2	4	6	3
(Germany) C-U Steeb	6	6	3	6
(Germany) M Naewie	4	6	6	2	2
14	(Commonwealth of Independent States) A Volkov	6	4	4	6	6

Third round
3	(United States) P Sampras	6	6	6
(France) R Gilbert	3	2	3
(Germany) C-U Steeb	6	6	6
14	(Commonwealth of Independent States) A Volkov	2	4	4

Fourth round
3	(United States) P Sampras	6	6	6
(Germany) C-U Steeb	4	3	2

==== Section 4 ====
First round
11	(United States) A Agassi	6	6	6
(Argentina) J Frana	1	4	4
(Italy) G Pozzi	6	6	6
(France) O Delaître	1	3	4
(Croatia) G Prpić	6	7^{7}	6
(United States) R Reneberg	0	6^{4}	4
(Belgium) E Masso	0	7	2	6	2
(Italy) C Pistolesi	6	5	6	2	6
(Austria) H Skoff	4	2	2
(Spain) E Sánchez	6	6	6
(Netherlands) J Eltingh	3	3	1
(Australia) W Masur	6	6	6
(Belgium) B Wuyts	7	6	6
(Sweden) A Järryd	5	2	2
(Brazil) L Mattar	7	3	6	6^{5}	4
6	(France) G Forget	5	6	3	7^{7}	6

Second round
11	(United States) A Agassi	6	6	6
(Italy) G Pozzi	0	2	1
(Croatia) G Prpić	6	6	6
(Italy) C Pistolesi	2	4	3
(Spain) E Sánchez	3	5	6	6	13
(Australia) W Masur	6	7	3	4	11
(Belgium) B Wuyts	6	6	6
6	(France) G Forget	3	3	3

Third round
11	(United States) A Agassi	2	6	6	7^{7}
(Croatia) G Prpić	6	4	1	6^{4}
(Spain) E Sánchez	6	6	7^{7}
(Belgium) B Wuyts	0	4	6^{3}

Fourth round
11	(United States) A Agassi	6	6	7
(Spain) E Sánchez	1	3	5

=== Bottom half ===
==== Section 5 ====
First round
5	(United States) M Chang	6	6	6
(Netherlands) P Haarhuis	4	3	3
(Italy) O Camporese	6	4	4	4
(Spain) M A Górriz	3	6	6	6
Q	(Germany) M Zillner	1	5	7^{10}	6	6
(Israel) A Mansdorf	6	7	6^{8}	0	3
(United States) J McEnroe	2	5	7^{7}	5
(Sweden) N Kulti	6	7	6^{5}	7
Q	(Uruguay) D Pérez	3	6	6	7
(Italy) S Pescosolido	6	4	3	5
(Italy) D Nargiso	6	3	6	0	6
(Argentina) F Davín	4	6	3	6	1
(Sweden) M Gustafsson	6	6	6
(Spain) J Sánchez	3	2	1
(Spain) F Clavet	6^{4}	7^{11}	3	6^{5}
12	(Netherlands) R Krajicek	7^{7}	6^{9}	6	7^{7}

Second round
5	(United States) M Chang	6	2	6	6
(Spain) M A Górriz	3	6	3	0
Q	(Germany) M Zillner	6	1	6	6^{0}	2
(Sweden) N Kulti	4	6	2	7^{7}	6
Q	(Uruguay) D Pérez	4	6	6^{4}	7	8
(Italy) D Nargiso	6	3	7^{7}	5	6
(Sweden) M Gustafsson	3	4	6	1
12	(Netherlands) R Krajicek	6	6	4	6

Third round
5	(United States) M Chang	6^{5}	6	3	6	6
(Sweden) N Kulti	7^{7}	2	6	3	8
Q	(Uruguay) D Pérez	6	6	6
12	(Netherlands) R Krajicek	4	1	1

Fourth round
(Sweden) N Kulti	6	3	7	6
Q	(Uruguay) D Pérez	0	6	5	4

==== Section 6 ====
First round
13	(United States) A Krickstein	3	6	6	6
(Netherlands) M Koevermans	6	3	1	3
(United States) M Washington	6	7^{7}	4	6
(Spain) F Roig	3	6^{4}	6	2
(Australia) M Woodforde	3	6^{2}	1
(Uruguay) M Filippini	6	7^{7}	6
(Spain) G López	0	6	6	6
(Spain) T Carbonell	6	3	4	0
(United States) J Grabb	2	6	7^{7}	6
WC	(France) J-P Fleurian	6	2	6^{4}	3
Q	(Italy) M Cierro	1	5	0
WC	(France) H Leconte	6	7	6
WC	(France) L Roux	4	3	6	6	6
(Argentina) M Jaite	6	6	4	4	3
(United States) J Connors	5	6	7^{7}	1	2
4	(Germany) M Stich	7	3	6^{4}	6	6

Second round
13	(United States) A Krickstein	4	5	6	7^{9}	6
(United States) M Washington	6	7	4	6^{7}	3
(Uruguay) M Filippini	6	6	3	6
(Spain) G López	4	4	6	3
(United States) J Grabb	3	4	3
WC	(France) H Leconte	6	6	6
WC	(France) L Roux	1	4	4
4	(Germany) M Stich	6	6	6

Third round
13	(United States) A Krickstein	2	0^{r}
(Uruguay) M Filippini	6	1
WC	(France) H Leconte	7^{7}	6	6
4	(Germany) M Stich	6^{3}	4	4

Fourth round
(Uruguay) M Filippini	3	2	4
WC	(France) H Leconte	6	6	6

==== Section 7 ====
First round
7	(Czechoslovakia) P Korda	6	6	6
(Sweden) C Bergström	4	2	2
Q	(Argentina) D Orsanic	1	4	4
(Japan) S Matsuoka	6	6	6
WC	(France) S Simian	4	3	7^{7}	7^{7}	3
(Canada) C Pridham	6	6	6^{3}	6^{4}	6
(Netherlands) M Schapers	6	6	6
(Italy) R Furlan	1	4	4
(Haiti) R Agénor	7	3	4	6	3
(United States) J Tarango	5	6	6	3	6
(Sweden) J Svensson	2	1	6	3
Q	(Germany) D Prinosil	6	6	3	6
(Brazil) J Oncins	6	2	7	4	6
Q	(Germany) B Karbacher	3	6	5	6	4
(Spain) S Bruguera	4	2	1
10	(Czechoslovakia) I Lendl	6	6	6

Second round
7	(Czechoslovakia) P Korda	1	4	6	6	6
(Japan) S Matsuoka	6	6	4	4	4
(Canada) C Pridham	6^{6}	7	2	6	3
(Netherlands) M Schapers	7^{8}	5	6	3	6
(United States) J Tarango	6^{8}	6	6	6^{5}	2
Q	(Germany) D Prinosil	7^{10}	1	4	7^{7}	6
(Brazil) J Oncins	3	3	6	6	8
10	(Czechoslovakia) I Lendl	6	6	3	2	6

Third round
7	(Czechoslovakia) P Korda	6	6	3	6
(Netherlands) M Schapers	4	2	6	1
Q	(Germany) D Prinosil	3	2	2
(Brazil) J Oncins	6	6	6

Fourth round
7	(Czechoslovakia) P Korda	6	6	6
(Brazil) J Oncins	4	3	3

==== Section 8 ====
First round
15	(United States) B Gilbert	6	7	5	2	1
(France) C Pioline	2	5	7	6	6
(France) F Fontang	6	6^{5}	3	4
Q	(Belgium) X Daufresne	0	7^{7}	6	6
(Argentina) C Miniussi	3	2	6	3
(Ecuador) A Gómez	6	6	3	6
(France) F Santoro	6	3	2	6^{5}
(Sweden) L Jönsson	2	6	6	7^{7}
(Spain) J Arrese	1	3	7	7^{9}	3
(Commonwealth of Independent States) A Cherkasov	6	6	5	6^{7}	6
(Argentina) R Azar	4	7^{7}	6	7
Q	(Sweden) H Holm	6	6^{4}	3	5
(Germany) L Koslowski	6^{4}	3	4
(Argentina) G Markus	7^{7}	6	6
WC	(France) O Soules	5	1	7^{7}	5
2	(Sweden) S Edberg	7	6	6^{5}	7

Second round
(France) C Pioline	7	6	7
Q	(Belgium) X Daufresne	5	3	5
(Ecuador) A Gómez	6	6^{4}	4	4
(Sweden) L Jönsson	3	7^{7}	6	6
(Commonwealth of Independent States) A Cherkasov	5	7^{11}	6	6
(Argentina) R Azar	7	6^{9}	1	2
(Argentina) G Markus	6	6^{1}	5	6	4
2	(Sweden) S Edberg	4	7^{7}	7	4	6

Third round
(France) C Pioline	6	6^{2}	6	6
(Sweden) L Jönsson	2	7^{7}	2	2
(Commonwealth of Independent States) A Cherkasov	6	6	7^{7}
2	(Sweden) S Edberg	4	3	6^{4}

Fourth round
(France) C Pioline	3	3	6^{1}
(Commonwealth of Independent States) A Cherkasov	6	6	7^{7}

Preceded by 1992 Australian Open – Men's singles	Grand Slam men's singles	Succeeded by 1992 Wimbledon Championships – Men's singles
