= Alex Nizet =

American tennis player

- Country (sports): United States
- Born: February 22, 1967 (age 58); Sacramento, California
- Height: 6 ft 2 in (188 cm)

Singles
- Career record: 0–1
- Highest ranking: No. 426 (May 11, 1992)

Grand Slam singles results
- Australian Open: Q1 (1992)
- US Open: Q2 (1991)

Doubles
- Career record: 1–1
- Highest ranking: No. 460 (Jul 6, 1992)

Grand Slam doubles results
- Wimbledon: Q3 (1992)

Alex Nizet (born February 22, 1967) is an American former professional tennis player.

A native of Santa Barbara, Nizet played two years of collegiate tennis at UC Berkeley. He then transferred to Southern Methodist University, earning All-American honors in 1988 and 1989.

During the early 1990s he competed in professional tennis and had a win over Yevgeny Kafelnikov. In 1991 he made his only ATP Tour main draw appearance at the 1991 Hall of Fame Tennis Championships, where he lost in the first round of the singles to Martin Wostenholme, but made the quarter-finals of the doubles.
