= David Wheaton =

American author, radio host, columnist, and former tennis player

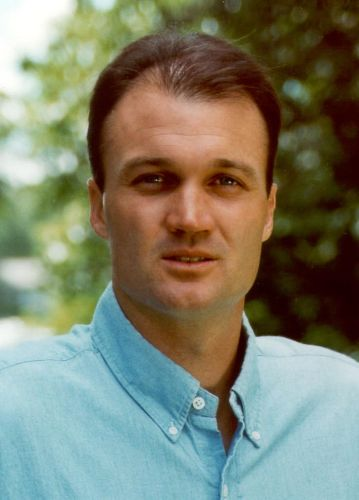
- Country (sports): United States
- Residence: Lake Minnetonka, Minnesota, US
- Born: June 2, 1969 (age 57) Minneapolis, Minnesota, US
- Height: 1.93 m (6 ft 4 in)
- Turned pro: 1988
- Retired: 2001
- Plays: Right-handed (two-handed backhand)
- Prize money: $5,238,401

Singles
- Career record: 232–191
- Career titles: 3
- Highest ranking: No. 12 (22 July 1991)

Grand Slam singles results
- Australian Open: QF (1990)
- French Open: 3R (1995)
- Wimbledon: SF (1991)
- US Open: QF (1990)

Other tournaments
- Grand Slam Cup: W (1991)

Doubles
- Career record: 157–122
- Career titles: 3
- Highest ranking: No. 24 (24 June 1991)

Grand Slam doubles results
- Australian Open: F (1991)
- French Open: SF (1995)
- Wimbledon: 2R (1990, 1993)
- US Open: F (1990)

Grand Slam mixed doubles results
- Australian Open: 2R (1990)
- Wimbledon: QF (1989)
- US Open: QF (1989)

Team competitions
- Davis Cup: 1–1
- Hopman Cup: F (1991)
- Last updated on: 29 November 2021.

David Wheaton (born June 2, 1969) is an American author, radio host, columnist, and former professional tennis player.

== Early life ==
Wheaton was born in Minneapolis as the youngest of four children. He started playing tennis at age four and played in his first tournament aged eight. He won the Minnesota State High School tennis title in 1984 as a freshman. He trained at the Nick Bollettieri Tennis Academy for his last two-and-a-half years of high school and played one year at Stanford.

=== Juniors ===
In 1987, Wheaton won the US Open junior title and was the No. 1 ranked junior player in the US. In 1988, he helped Stanford University's tennis team win the NCAA team title and received the Block S Award as the most outstanding freshman athlete at Stanford.

=== Pro tour ===
Wheaton turned professional on July 4, 1988 and won his first top-level singles title in 1990 at the U.S. Clay Court Championships in Kiawah Island, South Carolina. He was also runner-up in the men's doubles at the 1990 US Open, partnering with Paul Annacone.

The most significant highlights of his career came in 1991. He won the Grand Slam Cup in Munich, beating Michael Chang in straight sets in the final 7–5, 6–2, 6–4. He also reached the semifinals of singles at Wimbledon (beating Petr Korda, Cédric Pioline, Ivan Lendl, Jan Gunnarsson and Andre Agassi in the quarterfinals before being knocked-out by Boris Becker). He was a men's doubles runner-up at the Australian Open (partnering with his former Stanford teammate Patrick McEnroe). Wheaton reached his career-high singles ranking of world No. 12 in July 1991.

During his career, Wheaton won three top-level singles and three doubles titles, representing the US in Davis Cup (v. Australia, 1993) reached the semifinals or better in either singles or doubles of every Grand Slam tournament, and defeated highly ranked players such as Andre Agassi, Jimmy Connors, Ivan Lendl, Stefan Edberg, Jim Courier, and Michael Chang.

He retired from the professional tour in 2001, following a series of injuries. Since then he has played in some senior tour events, winning the "Wimbledon Over 35 Doubles" championship in 2004 (with T.J. Middleton).

== Personal life ==
During his tennis career, he dated tennis star Mary Joe Fernández around 1990–1992. Wheaton married in 2009 and has one son.

== Junior Grand Slam finals ==
=== Singles: 1 (1 title) ===
Result	Year	Tournament	Surface	Opponent	Score
Win	1987	US Open	Hard	(Soviet Union) Andrey Cherkasov	7–5, 6–0

=== Doubles: 1 (1 runner-up) ===
Result	Year	Tournament	Surface	Partner	Opponents	Score
Loss	1986	US Open	Hard	(United States) Jeff Tarango	(Spain) Tomas Carbonell (Spain) Javier Sanchez	4–6, 6–1, 1–6

== ATP career finals ==
=== Singles: 7 (3 titles, 4 runner-ups) ===
Legend Grand Slam Tournaments (0–0) ATP World Tour Finals (1–0) ATP Masters Series(0–1) ATP Championship Series (0–0) ATP World Series (2–3)	Finals by surface Hard (0–1) Clay (1–1) Grass (1–2) Carpet (1–0)	Finals by setting Outdoors (2–4) Indoors (1–0)

Result	W–L	Date	Tournament	Tier	Surface	Opponent	Score
Win	1–0	May 1990	Kiawah Island, United States	World Series	Clay	(South Africa) Mark Kaplan	6–4, 6–4
Loss	1–1	Mar 1991	Miami, United States	Masters Series	Hard	(United States) Jim Courier	6–4, 3–6, 4–6
Loss	1–2	Jun 1991	Queen's, United Kingdom	World Series	Grass	(Sweden) Stefan Edberg	2–6, 3–6
Win	2–2	Dec 1991	Munich, Germany	Grand Slam Cup	Carpet	(United States) Michael Chang	7–5, 6–2, 6–4
Loss	2–3	May 1993	Coral Springs, United States	World Series	Clay	(United States) Todd Martin	3–6, 4–6
Win	3–3	Jul 1994	Newport, United States	World Series	Grass	(Australia) Todd Woodbridge	6–4, 3–6, 7–6^{(7–5)}
Loss	3–4	Jul 1995	Newport, United States	World Series	Grass	(Germany) David Prinosil	6–7^{(3–7)}, 7–5, 2–6

=== Doubles: 15 (3 titles, 12 runner-ups) ===
Legend Grand Slam Tournaments (0–2) ATP World Tour Finals (0–0) ATP Masters Series (1–0) ATP Championship Series (0–0) ATP World Series (2–10)	Finals by surface Hard (2–6) Clay (1–3) Grass (0–3) Carpet (0–0)	Finals by setting Outdoors (3–12) Indoors (0–0)

Result	W–L	Date	Tournament	Tier	Surface	Partner	Opponents	Score
Win	1–0	Jul 1990	Toronto, Canada	Masters Series	Hard	(United States) Paul Annacone	(Australia) Broderick Dyke (Sweden) Peter Lundgren	6–1, 7–6
Loss	1–1	Aug 1990	New York, United States	Grand Slam	Hard	(United States) Paul Annacone	(South Africa) Pieter Aldrich (South Africa) Danie Visser	2–6, 6–7, 2–6
Loss	1–2	Jan 1991	Melbourne, Australia	Grand Slam	Hard	(United States) Patrick McEnroe	(United States) Scott Davis (United States) David Pate	7–6, 6–7, 3–6, 5–7
Loss	1–3	May 1991	Umag, Croatia	World Series	Clay	(United States) Richey Reneberg	(Israel) Gilad Bloom (Spain) Javier Sanchez	6–7, 6–2, 1–6
Loss	1–4	Jul 1992	Newport, United States	World Series	Grass	(United States) Paul Annacone	(South Africa) Royce Deppe (Czech Republic) David Rikl	4–6, 4–6
Loss	1–5	Aug 1992	Los Angeles, United States	World Series	Hard	(United States) Francisco Montana	(United States) Patrick Galbraith (United States) Jim Pugh	6–7, 6–7
Win	2–5	Apr 1993	Hong Kong, Hong Kong	World Series	Hard	(Australia) Todd Woodbridge	(Australia) Sandon Stolle (Australia) Jason Stoltenberg	6–1, 6–3
Loss	2–6	Jul 1994	Newport, United States	World Series	Grass	(United States) Kent Kinnear	(Austria) Alex Antonitsch (Canada) Greg Rusedski	4–6, 6–3, 4–6
Loss	2–7	Apr 1995	Nice, France	World Series	Clay	(United States) Luke Jensen	(Czech Republic) Cyril Suk (Czech Republic) Daniel Vacek	6–3, 6–7, 6–7
Loss	2–8	Oct 1995	Tel Aviv, Israel	World Series	Hard	(United States) Kent Kinnear	(United States) Jim Grabb (United States) Jared Palmer	4–6, 5–7
Win	3–8	May 1996	Atlanta, United States	World Series	Clay	(South Africa) Christo Van Rensburg	(United States) Bill Behrens (United States) Matt Lucena	7–6, 6–2
Loss	3–9	May 1996	Pinehurst, United States	World Series	Clay	(United States) Ken Flach	(Australia) Pat Cash (Australia) Patrick Rafter	2–6, 3–6
Loss	3–10	Mar 1998	Scottsdale, United States	International Series	Hard	(United States) Kent Kinnear	(Czech Republic) Cyril Suk (Australia) Michael Tebbutt	6–4, 1–6, 6–7
Loss	3–11	Apr 1999	Hong Kong, Hong Kong	international Series	Hard	(United States) Andre Agassi	(New Zealand) James Greenhalgh (Australia) Grant Silcock	walkover
Loss	3–12	Jun 2001	Queen's, United Kingdom	international Series	Grass	(United States) Eric Taino	(United States) Mike Bryan (United States) Bob Bryan	3–6, 6–3, 1–6

== ATP Challenger and ITF Futures finals ==
=== Singles: 2 (1–1) ===
Legend ATP Challenger (1–1) ITF Futures (0–0)	Finals by surface Hard (1–0) Clay (0–0) Grass (0–1) Carpet (0–0)

Result	W–L	Date	Tournament	Tier	Surface	Opponent	Score
Win	1–0	Apr 1989	Brasília, Brazil	Challenger	Hard	(United States) Dan Cassidy	6–1, 6–2
Loss	1–1	Jun 1996	Annenheim, Austria	Challenger	Grass	(Germany) Alex Radulescu	4–6, 2–6

=== Doubles: 1 (1–0) ===
Legend ATP Challenger (1–0) ITF Futures (0–0)	Finals by surface Hard (1–0) Clay (0–0) Grass (0–0) Carpet (0–0)

Result	W–L	Date	Tournament	Tier	Surface	Partner	Opponents	Score
Win	1–0	Apr 1989	Itu, Brazil	Challenger	Hard	(United States) Kent Kinnear	(Brazil) Nelson Aerts (Brazil) Marcos Hocevar	6–3, 6–4

== Performance timelines ==
Key
W	F	SF	QF	#R	RR	Q#	DNQ	A	NH

(W) winner; (F) finalist; (SF) semifinalist; (QF) quarterfinalist; (#R) rounds 4, 3, 2, 1; (RR) round-robin stage; (Q#) qualification round; (DNQ) did not qualify; (A) absent; (NH) not held; (SR) strike rate (events won / competed); (W–L) win–loss record.

=== Singles ===
Tournament	1986	1987	1988	1989	1990	1991	1992	1993	1994	1995	1996	1997	1998	1999	2000	2001	SR	W–L	Win %
Grand Slam tournaments
Australian Open	A	A	A	1R	QF	1R	4R	3R	A	4R	2R	A	2R	A	A	A	0 / 8	14–8	64%
French Open	A	A	A	2R	1R	1R	2R	1R	2R	3R	2R	A	A	A	A	A	0 / 8	6–8	43%
Wimbledon	A	Q1	A	1R	4R	SF	3R	4R	1R	3R	3R	A	1R	Q2	A	A	0 / 9	17–9	65%
US Open	A	1R	A	2R	QF	4R	3R	1R	1R	2R	4R	1R	1R	A	Q2	A	0 / 11	14–11	56%
Win–loss	0–0	0–1	0–0	2–4	11–4	8–4	8–4	5–4	1–3	8–4	7–4	0–1	1–3	0–0	0–0	0–0	0 / 36	51–36	59%
Year-end Championships
Grand Slam Cup	Did not qualify				SF	W	Did not qualify								Not Held		1 / 2	6–1	86%
ATP Masters Series
Indian Wells	A	A	A	A	A	1R	2R	2R	A	3R	A	A	A	A	A	A	0 / 4	4–4	50%
Miami	1R	A	A	A	A	F	2R	1R	3R	3R	A	A	1R	A	A	A	0 / 7	9–7	56%
Monte Carlo	A	A	A	A	A	A	A	A	A	QF	A	A	A	A	A	A	0 / 1	3–1	75%
Rome	A	A	A	A	1R	A	A	A	A	A	A	A	A	A	A	A	0 / 1	0–1	0%
Canada	A	A	A	A	3R	A	1R	2R	3R	1R	A	A	A	Q1	1R	A	0 / 6	5–6	45%
Cincinnati	A	A	A	A	2R	3R	QF	1R	SF	2R	A	2R	Q1	A	A	Q2	0 / 7	11–7	61%
Stuttgart	Not Held		A	A	A	A	A	A	A	A	A	Q1	A	A	A	A	0 / 0	0–0	–
Paris	A	A	A	A	1R	2R	QF	2R	2R	2R	Q2	A	A	A	A	A	0 / 6	6–6	50%
Win–loss	0–1	0–0	0–0	0–0	3–4	7–4	7–5	3–5	9–4	8–6	0–0	1–1	0–1	0–0	0–1	0–0	0 / 32	38–32	54%

=== Doubles ===
Tournament	1987	1988	1989	1990	1991	1992	1993	1994	1995	1996	1997	1998	1999	2000	2001	SR	W–L	Win %
Grand Slam tournaments
Australian Open	A	A	1R	2R	F	A	1R	A	1R	1R	A	SF	A	A	A	0 / 7	10–7	59%
French Open	A	A	A	1R	2R	2R	1R	A	SF	1R	A	A	A	A	A	0 / 6	6–6	50%
Wimbledon	A	A	A	2R	A	A	2R	A	A	1R	A	A	A	A	A	0 / 3	2–3	40%
US Open	1R	A	QF	F	A	1R	2R	1R	2R	3R	A	2R	A	A	A	0 / 9	13–9	59%
Win–loss	0–1	0–0	3–2	7–4	6–2	1–2	2–4	0–1	5–3	2–4	0–0	5–2	0–0	0–0	0–0	0 / 25	31–25	55%
ATP Masters Series
Indian Wells	A	A	A	A	2R	SF	A	A	2R	A	A	A	A	A	A	0 / 3	5–3	63%
Miami	A	A	A	A	SF	1R	SF	3R	1R	A	A	1R	A	A	Q1	0 / 6	9–6	60%
Canada	A	A	A	W	A	2R	2R	A	QF	A	A	A	A	A	A	1 / 4	9–3	75%
Cincinnati	A	A	A	A	2R	A	2R	Q1	1R	A	A	1R	A	A	A	0 / 4	2–4	33%
Stuttgart	NH	A	A	A	A	A	A	A	A	A	Q1	A	A	A	A	0 / 0	0–0	–
Paris	A	A	A	1R	QF	A	A	1R	A	A	A	A	A	A	A	0 / 3	2–3	40%
Win–loss	0–0	0–0	0–0	5–1	7–4	4–3	6–3	2–2	3–4	0–0	0–0	0–2	0–0	0–0	0–0	1 / 20	27–19	59%

=== Mixed doubles ===
Tournament	1989	1990	1991	1992	1993	1994	1995	1996	1997	1998	SR	W–L	Win %
Grand Slam tournaments
Australian Open	A	2R	A	A	A	A	A	A	A	A	0 / 1	1–1	50%
French Open	A	A	A	A	A	A	A	A	A	A	0 / 0	0–0	–
Wimbledon	QF	A	A	A	A	A	A	A	A	1R	0 / 2	3–2	60%
US Open	QF	A	A	A	A	A	A	A	A	A	0 / 1	2–1	67%
Win–loss	5–2	1–1	0–0	0–0	0–0	0–0	0–0	0–0	0–0	0–1	0 / 4	6–4	60%

== Radio and writing career ==
In 2002, Wheaton embarked a new career in radio, writing, and speaking. He is the producer and host of The Christian Worldview, a live talk radio program that airs on 250 stations in the US. He is a tennis columnist for the Minneapolis Star-Tribune and the author of two books, University of Destruction: Your Game Plan for Spiritual Victory on Campus (Bethany House, 2005) and My Boy, Ben—A Story of Love, Loss and Grace (Tristan Publishing, 2014).

== Service and awards ==
Wheaton serves on the board of The Overcomer Foundation, a non-profit organization that directs his radio ministry. He also served on the board of directors of the United States Tennis Association (USTA) from 2003-2006. He is a member of the Intercollegiate Tennis Hall of Fame (class of 2012) and the USTA Northern Section Hall of Fame (class of 2005). Wheaton received the Eugene L. Scott Renaissance Award in 2011—an award presented to a national/international tennis champion who demonstrates excellence in promoting and developing the sport of tennis in public parks.

== External links and sources ==
- David Wheaton's Radio Show – The Christian Worldview
- David Wheaton at the Association of Tennis Professionals
- David Wheaton at World Tennis
- David Wheaton at the Davis Cup (archived)
