= 1995 Hall of Fame Tennis Championships =

- Date: July 10–16
- Edition: 20th
- Category: World Series
- Draw: 32S / 16D
- Prize money: $230,000
- Surface: Grass / outdoor
- Location: Newport, Rhode Island, U.S.
- Venue: Newport Casino

Champions

Singles
- (Germany) David Prinosil

Doubles
- (Germany) Jörn Renzenbrink / (Germany) Markus Zoecke
← 1994 ·	Hall of Fame Open	· 1996 →

The 1995 Hall of Fame Tennis Championships (also known as 1995 Miller Lite Hall of Fame Championships for sponsorship reasons) was a men's tennis tournament played on grass courts at the International Tennis Hall of Fame in Newport, Rhode Island in the United States and was part of the World Series of the 1995 ATP Tour. It was the 20th edition of the tournament and was held from July 10 through July 16, 1995. Sixth-seeded David Prinosil won the singles title.

== Finals ==
=== Singles ===
(Germany) David Prinosil defeated (United States) David Wheaton 7–6^{(7–3)}, 5–7, 6–2

- It was Prinosil's first singles title of his career.

=== Doubles ===
(Germany) Jörn Renzenbrink / (Germany) Markus Zoecke defeated (Australia) Paul Kilderry / (Portugal) Nuno Marques 6–1, 6–2
