= Gianluca Pozzi =

Italian tennis player

- Country (sports): Italy
- Residence: Bari, Italy
- Born: 17 June 1965 (age 60); Bari, Italy
- Height: 1.80 m (5 ft 11 in)
- Turned pro: 1984
- Retired: 2004
- Plays: Left-handed (one-handed backhand)
- Prize money: $2,272,035

Singles
- Career record: 175–259
- Career titles: 1
- Highest ranking: No. 40 (29 January 2001)

Grand Slam singles results
- Australian Open: 3R (1999)
- French Open: 2R (1992, 1998)
- Wimbledon: 4R (2000)
- US Open: 4R (1994)

Other tournaments
- Olympic Games: 2R (2000)

Doubles
- Career record: 39–71
- Career titles: 1
- Highest ranking: No. 107 (16 September 1991)

Grand Slam doubles results
- Australian Open: 3R (1990)
- French Open: 1R (1992)
- Wimbledon: 2R (1992)
- US Open: 2R (1992)
- Last updated on: 12 December 2021.

Gianluca Pozzi (Italian pronunciation: [dʒanˈluːka ˈpottsi]; born 17 June 1965) is a former tennis player from Italy, who turned professional in 1984.

Pozzi won one singles title (1991, Brisbane) and one doubles title (1991, Newport) during his career. The left-hander reached his highest individual ranking on the ATP Tour on 29 January 2001, when he became World No. 40.

During his career, Pozzi notably defeated Grand Slam champions Andre Agassi, Ivan Lendl, Marat Safin, Sergi Bruguera and Roger Federer. And in 2000 Pozzi, at the age of 35, memorably reached the Round of 16 on grass at Wimbledon, prompting Italian tennis journalist Dr. Giovanni Clerici to write that "Nonno" Gianluca ("Grandfather" Gianluca) had won a great victory there.

== ATP career finals ==
=== Singles: 2 (1 title, 1 runner-up) ===
Legend Grand Slam Tournaments (0–0) ATP World Tour Finals (0–0) ATP World Tour Masters Series (0–0) ATP Championship Series (0–0) ATP World Series (1–1)	Finals by surface Hard (1–0) Clay (0–0) Grass (0–0) Carpet (0–1)	Finals by setting Outdoors (1–0) Indoors (0–1)

Result	W–L	Date	Tournament	Tier	Surface	Opponent	Score
Win	1–0	Sep 1991	Brisbane, Australia	World Series	Hard	(United States) Aaron Krickstein	6–3, 7–6
Loss	1–1	Oct 1992	Vienna, Austria	World Series	Carpet	(Czech Republic) Petr Korda	3–6, 2–6, 7–5, 1–6

=== Doubles: 2 (1 title, 1 runner-up) ===
Legend Grand Slam Tournaments (0–0) ATP World Tour Finals (0–0) ATP Masters Series (0–0) ATP Championship Series (0–0) ATP World Series (1–1)	Finals by surface Hard (0–1) Clay (0–0) Grass (1–0) Carpet (0–0)	Finals by setting Outdoors (1–1) Indoors (0–0)

Result	W–L	Date	Tournament	Tier	Surface	Partner	Opponents	Score
Win	1–0	Jul 1991	Newport, United States	World Series	Grass	(New Zealand) Brett Steven	(Argentina) Javier Frana (United States) Bruce Steel	6–4, 6–4
Loss	1–1	Aug 1992	Long Island, United States	World Series	Hard	(Finland) Olli Rahnasto	(United States) Francisco Montana (United States) Greg Van Emburgh	4–6, 2–6

== ATP Challenger and ITF Futures Finals ==
=== Singles: 19 (10–9) ===
Legend ATP Challenger (10–9) ITF Futures (0–0)	Finals by surface Hard (8–6) Clay (0–0) Grass (1–0) Carpet (1–3)

Result	W–L	Date	Tournament	Tier	Surface	Opponent	Score
Loss	0–1	Nov 1989	Munich, Germany	Challenger	Carpet	(United States) Bryan Shelton	4–6, 5–7
Win	1–1	May 1993	Kuala Lumpur, Malaysia	Challenger	Hard	(Sweden) Jonas Björkman	3–5 ret.
Win	2–1	May 1994	Taipei, Taiwan	Challenger	Hard	(South Africa) Mark Kaplan	6–4, 6–0
Loss	2–2	Jul 1994	Aptos, United States	Challenger	Hard	(Japan) Shuzo Matsuoka	5–7, 3–6
Win	3–2	Feb 1995	Cherbourg, France	Challenger	Hard	(Denmark) Kenneth Carlsen	1–6, 7–6, 6–4
Loss	3–3	Jan 1996	Heilbronn, Germany	Challenger	Carpet	(United States) Chris Woodruff	3–6, 3–6
Win	4–3	Feb 1996	Wolfsburg, Germany	Challenger	Carpet	(Sweden) Thomas Johansson	4–6, 7–6, 7–6
Win	5–3	Nov 1996	Portorož, Slovenia	Challenger	Hard	(Slovakia) Ján Krošlák	7–6, 6–7, 6–2
Win	6–3	Jul 1997	Flushing Meadows, United States	Challenger	Hard	(United States) Tommy Ho	6–1, 6–4
Win	7–3	Jul 1997	Winnetka, United States	Challenger	Hard	(Zimbabwe) Wayne Black	6–4, 6–2
Loss	7–4	Aug 1997	Lexington, United States	Challenger	Hard	(Zimbabwe) Wayne Black	4–6, 1–6
Loss	7–5	Aug 1997	Bronx, United States	Challenger	Hard	(United States) Michael Sell	6–3, 4–6, 3–6
Win	8–5	Nov 1997	Andorra la Vella, Andorra	Challenger	Hard	(France) Nicolas Escudé	7–6, 4–6, 6–2
Loss	8–6	Feb 1998	Heilbronn, Germany	Challenger	Carpet	(Germany) Martin Sinner	0–6, 6–3, 3–6
Loss	8–7	Mar 1998	Cherbourg, France	Challenger	Hard	(France) Jérôme Golmard	6–3, 4–6, 3–6
Win	9–7	Jun 1998	Surbiton, United Kingdom	Challenger	Grass	(Zimbabwe) Kevin Ullyett	6–4, 6–3
Win	10–7	Oct 1998	Tel Aviv, Israel	Challenger	Hard	(Israel) Lior Mor	6–1, 6–7, 6–3
Loss	10–8	Feb 2000	Wrocław, Poland	Challenger	Hard	(Czech Republic) Martin Damm	6–4, 4–6, 3–6
Loss	10–9	May 2000	Jerusalem, Israel	Challenger	Hard	(South Africa) Kevin Ullyett	4–6, 3–6

=== Doubles: 6 (2–4) ===
Legend ATP Challenger (2–4) ITF Futures (0–0)	Finals by surface Hard (1–1) Clay (0–0) Grass (0–1) Carpet (1–2)

Result	W–L	Date	Tournament	Tier	Surface	Partner	Opponents	Score
Loss	0–1	Nov 1989	Munich, Germany	Challenger	Carpet	(Czech Republic) Jaroslav Bulant	(Sweden) Peter Nyborg (Sweden) Tomas Nydahl	2–6, 6–1, 6–7
Loss	0–2	Sep 1991	Istanbul, Turkey	Challenger	Hard	(Finland) Olli Rahnasto	(Sweden) Henrik Holm (Sweden) Nils Holm	7–5, 5–7, 4–6
Win	1–2	Dec 2001	Milan, Italy	Challenger	Carpet	(Italy) Nicola Bruno	(Italy) Daniele Bracciali (Italy) Federico Luzzi	2–6, 7–6^{(7–2)}, 6–3
Loss	1–3	Feb 2002	Wolfsburg, Germany	Challenger	Carpet	(Italy) Filippo Messori	(Czech Republic) Jan Hernych (South Africa) Federico Luzzi	6–7^{(3–7)}, 7–6^{(7–3)}, 3–6
Loss	1–4	Jul 2002	Bristol, United Kingdom	Challenger	Grass	(Italy) Daniele Bracciali	(Australia) Dejan Petrovic (Pakistan) Aisam Qureshi	3–6, 2–6
Win	2–4	Aug 2002	Wrexham, United Kingdom	Challenger	Hard	(Italy) Stefano Pescosolido	(Italy) Daniele Bracciali (Pakistan) Aisam Qureshi	6–4, 6–4

== Performance timelines ==
Key
W	F	SF	QF	#R	RR	Q#	DNQ	A	NH

(W) winner; (F) finalist; (SF) semifinalist; (QF) quarterfinalist; (#R) rounds 4, 3, 2, 1; (RR) round-robin stage; (Q#) qualification round; (DNQ) did not qualify; (A) absent; (NH) not held; (SR) strike rate (events won / competed); (W–L) win–loss record.

=== Singles ===
Tournament	1984	1985	1986	1987	1988	1989	1990	1991	1992	1993	1994	1995	1996	1997	1998	1999	2000	2001	2002	SR	W–L	Win %
Grand Slam tournaments
Australian Open	A	A	A	A	2R	2R	1R	Q2	2R	1R	1R	1R	A	A	2R	3R	2R	2R	A	0 / 11	8–11	42%
French Open	A	A	A	A	A	A	A	A	2R	1R	A	1R	A	Q1	2R	1R	1R	1R	Q1	0 / 7	2–7	22%
Wimbledon	Q2	A	A	A	Q2	A	Q2	2R	1R	1R	1R	2R	2R	Q2	1R	2R	4R	1R	Q3	0 / 10	7–10	41%
US Open	A	A	A	2R	2R	1R	A	A	2R	1R	4R	1R	1R	Q1	1R	2R	2R	1R	Q1	0 / 12	8–12	40%
Win–loss	0–0	0–0	0–0	1–1	2–2	1–2	0–1	1–1	3–4	0–4	3–3	1–4	1–2	0–0	2–4	4–4	5–4	1–4	0–0	0 / 40	25–40	38%
Olympic Games
Summer Olympics	A	Not Held			A	Not Held			A	Not Held			A	Not Held			2R	NH		0 / 1	1–1	50%
ATP Tour Masters 1000
Indian Wells	A	A	A	A	A	A	A	A	A	A	A	A	A	A	A	A	A	2R	A	0 / 1	1–1	50%
Miami	A	A	A	A	A	A	A	A	2R	2R	A	A	1R	A	2R	1R	4R	2R	A	0 / 7	7–7	50%
Monte Carlo	A	A	A	A	A	A	A	A	A	A	A	A	A	A	A	A	A	1R	A	0 / 1	0–1	0%
Hamburg	A	A	A	A	A	A	A	A	A	A	A	A	A	A	A	1R	A	1R	A	0 / 2	0–2	0%
Rome	A	A	A	1R	A	A	1R	A	1R	1R	1R	1R	1R	A	1R	1R	A	1R	A	0 / 10	0–10	0%
Canada	A	A	A	A	A	A	1R	1R	1R	1R	A	1R	A	A	2R	1R	A	A	A	0 / 7	1–7	13%
Cincinnati	A	A	1R	A	A	A	1R	3R	2R	1R	A	A	A	A	1R	A	2R	A	A	0 / 7	4–7	36%
Stuttgart	NH				A	A	A	A	A	A	A	A	Q3	A	2R	1R	A	A	A	0 / 2	1–2	33%
Paris	A	A	A	A	A	A	A	A	Q2	A	A	Q1	A	A	2R	A	3R	A	A	0 / 2	3–2	60%
Win–loss	0–0	0–0	0–1	0–1	0–0	0–0	0–3	2–2	2–4	1–4	0–1	0–2	0–2	0–0	4–6	0–5	6–3	2–5	0–0	0 / 39	17–39	30%

=== Doubles ===
Tournament	1988	1989	1990	1991	1992	1993	1994	1995	SR	W–L	Win %
Grand Slam tournaments
Australian Open	2R	1R	3R	2R	1R	A	A	A	0 / 5	4–5	44%
French Open	A	A	A	A	1R	A	A	A	0 / 1	0–1	0%
Wimbledon	Q1	A	1R	Q3	2R	A	A	A	0 / 2	1–2	33%
US Open	A	A	1R	A	2R	A	A	A	0 / 2	1–2	33%
Win–loss	1–1	0–1	2–3	1–1	2–4	0–0	0–0	0–0	0 / 10	6–10	38%
ATP Tour Masters 1000
Miami	A	A	A	A	A	A	A	2R	0 / 1	1–1	50%
Rome	1R	A	A	A	1R	A	1R	A	0 / 3	0–3	0%
Canada	A	A	A	1R	Q1	1R	A	A	0 / 2	0–2	0%
Cincinnati	A	A	A	A	1R	A	A	A	0 / 1	0–1	0%
Win–loss	0–1	0–0	0–0	0–1	0–2	0–1	0–1	1–1	0 / 7	1–7	13%
