= Bruce Steel =

American tennis player

- Country (sports): United States
- Born: October 17, 1966 (age 59)
- Prize money: $14,742

Singles
- Career record: 0–1
- Highest ranking: No. 387 (Dec 24, 1990)

Grand Slam singles results
- Wimbledon: Q3 (1991)
- US Open: Q1 (1991)

Doubles
- Career record: 3–3
- Highest ranking: No. 282 (Jul 15, 1991)

Grand Slam doubles results
- Wimbledon: Q1 (1991)

Bruce Steel (born October 17, 1966) is an American former professional tennis player.

Steel, the son of a San Diego urologist, attended Dartmouth College in the 1980s. He played collegiate tennis for the Dartmouth Big Green and earned All-Ivy doubles selection in 1988.

On the professional tour, Steel competed mostly in satellite tournaments and reached a best singles world ranking of 387. In 1991 he made the final round of the Wimbledon qualifiers for singles and partnered with Jeff Tarango in the doubles main draw at Queen's Club. He also featured in the qualifying draw at that year's US Open and was a doubles finalist in the 1991 Hall of Fame Championships held in Newport, Rhode Island.

== ATP Tour finals ==
=== Doubles (1) ===
Result	W–L	Date	Tournament	Surface	Partner	Opponents	Score
Loss	0–1	Jul 1991	Newport, U.S.	Grass	(Argentina) Javier Frana	(Italy) Gianluca Pozzi (Australia) Brett Steven	4–6, 4–6
