= 1993 Miller Lite Hall of Fame Tennis Championships =

- Date: July 5–11
- Edition: 20th
- Category: World Series
- Draw: 32S / 16D
- Prize money: $175,000
- Surface: Grass / outdoor
- Location: Newport, Rhode Island, U.S.
- Venue: Newport Casino

Champions

Singles
- (Canada) Greg Rusedski

Doubles
- (Argentina) Javier Frana / (South Africa) Christo van Rensburg
- Hall of Fame Open

The 1993 Miller Lite Hall of Fame Tennis Championships, was a men's tennis tournament played on outdoor grass courts at the Newport Casino in Newport, Rhode Island, United States that was part of the World Series of the 1993 ATP Tour. It was the 20th edition of the tournament and was held from July 5 through July 11, 1993. Unseeded Greg Rusedski won the singles title.

== Finals ==
=== Singles ===
(Canada) Greg Rusedski defeated (Argentina) Javier Frana 7–5, 6–7^{(7–9)}, 7–6^{(7–5)}

- It was Rusedski's 1st singles title of his career.

=== Doubles ===
(Argentina) Javier Frana / (South Africa) Christo van Rensburg defeated (Zimbabwe) Byron Black / (United States) Jim Pugh 4–6, 6–1, 7–6
