= Javier Frana =

Argentine tennis player (born 1966)

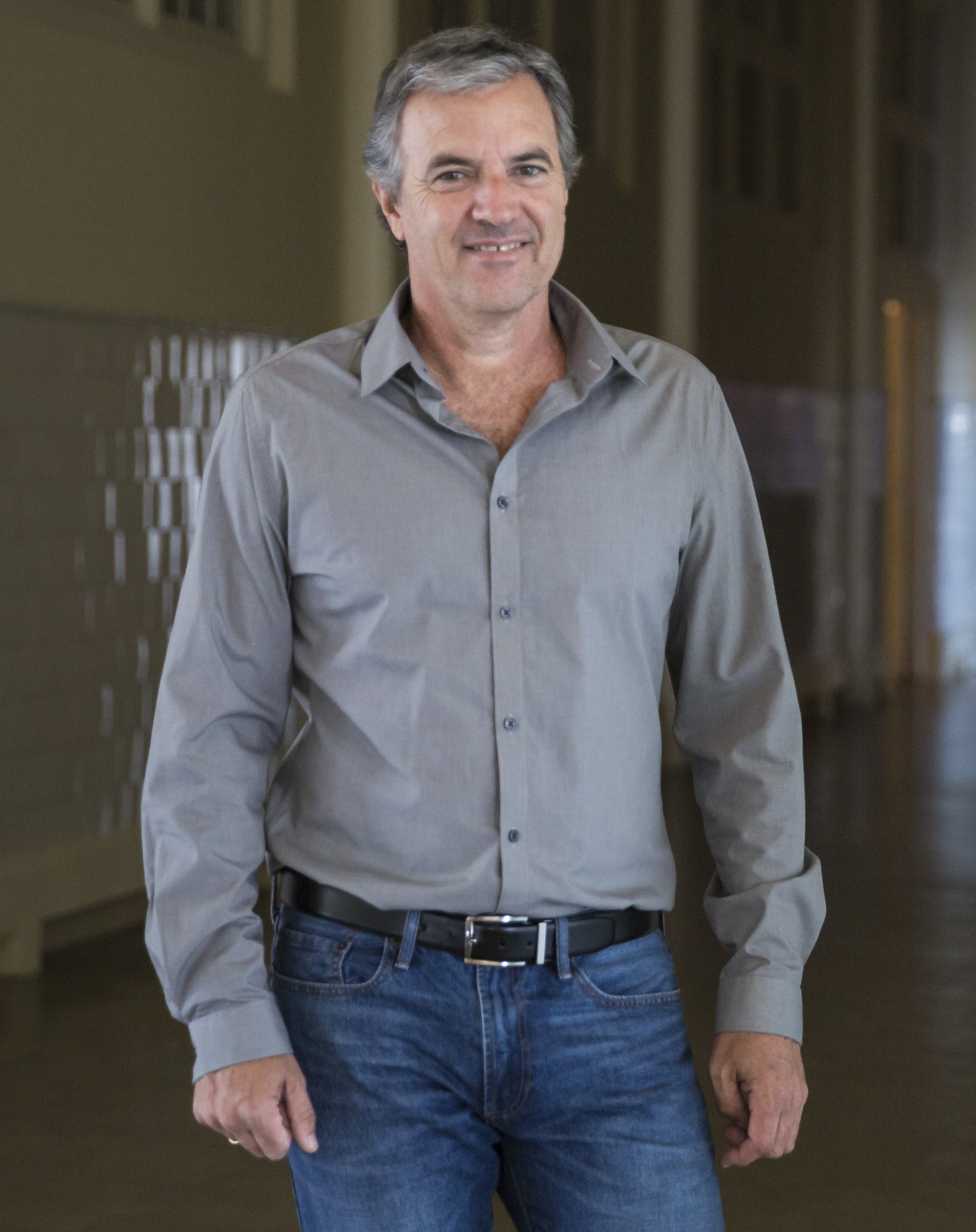
- Javier Frana in 2017
- Country (sports): Argentina
- Born: 25 December 1966 (age 59) Rafaela, Argentina
- Height: 6 ft 1 in (185 cm)
- Turned pro: 1986
- Retired: 1997
- Plays: Left-handed (one-handed backhand)
- Prize money: $1,691,848

Singles
- Career record: 163–158 (50.8%)
- Career titles: 3
- Highest ranking: No. 30 (24 July 1995)

Grand Slam singles results
- Australian Open: 3R (1987)
- French Open: 4R (1994)
- Wimbledon: 3R (1991, 1993, 1994, 1995)
- US Open: 4R (1994)

Doubles
- Career record: 186–161 (53.6%)
- Career titles: 7
- Highest ranking: No. 14 (25 May 1992)

Grand Slam doubles results
- Australian Open: 2R (1991, 1996)
- French Open: SF (1991)
- Wimbledon: F (1991)
- US Open: 3R (1991)

Grand Slam mixed doubles results
- Australian Open: 1R (1991, 1992, 1996)
- French Open: W (1996)
- Wimbledon: 3R (1992, 1994)
Medal record
Olympic Games
| Bronze medal – third place | 1992 Barcelona | Doubles |
Pan American Games
| Gold medal – first place | 1995 Mar del Plata | Doubles |
| Silver medal – second place | 1995 Mar del Plata | Singles |
- Last updated on: 13 February 2022.

Javier Alberto Frana Maggi (Spanish pronunciation: [xaˈβjeɾ ˈfɾana]; born 25 December 1966) is a former tennis player from Argentina and a commentator for ESPN Latin America. He won 1996 French Open mixed doubles title with compatriot Patricia Tarabini. He reached his career-high ATP singles ranking on 24 July 1995 of world No. 30. His highest doubles ranking was No. 14, achieved in May 1992.

== Tennis career ==
Frana turned professional in 1986.

Frana won the Abierto Mexicano doubles title in 1995 with Leonardo Lavalle.

=== Olympics ===
Frana debuted at the Seoul Olympics in 1988, where he was defeated in the second round by fellow countryman Martín Jaite, 2–6, 4–6 and 2–6. At the 1992 Olympics in Barcelona, he reached the second round again, this time falling to France's Fabrice Santoro, 6–4, 2–6, 1–6, and 1–6. He represented his native country for the last time in Olympic competition at the 1996 Summer Olympics in Atlanta, United States, where he was defeated in the first round by Great Britain's Greg Rusedski.

== Personal life ==
Frana was born in Rafaela, Argentina. He is of Croat origin, his family is from the Trogir area.

== ATP career finals ==
=== Singles: 9 (3 titles, 6 runner-ups) ===
| Legend Grand Slam Tournaments (0–0) ATP World Tour Finals (0–0) ATP Masters Series (0–0) ATP Championship Series (0–0) ATP International Series (3–6) | Finals by surface Hard (1–1) Clay (1–3) Grass (1–2) Carpet (0–0) | Finals by setting Outdoors (3–6) Indoors (0–0) |

| Result | W–L | Date | Tournament | Tier | Surface | Opponent | Score |
|---|---|---|---|---|---|---|---|
| Loss | 0–1 | Nov 1988 | Itaparica, Brazil | Grand Prix | Hard | (Peru) Jaime Yzaga | 6–7^{(4–7)}, 2–6 |
| Loss | 0–2 | Jul 1991 | Newport, United States | World Series | Grass | (United States) Bryan Shelton | 6–3, 4–6, 4–6 |
| Win | 1–2 | Oct 1991 | Guarujá, Brazil | World Series | Hard | (Germany) Markus Zoecke | 2–6, 7–6^{(7–1)}, 6–3 |
| Loss | 1–3 | Jul 1993 | Newport, United States | World Series | Grass | (United Kingdom) Greg Rusedski | 5–7, 7–6^{(9–7)}, 6–7^{(5–7)} |
| Win | 2–3 | Oct 1993 | Santiago, Chile | World Series | Clay | (Spain) Emilio Sánchez | 7–5, 3–6, 6–3 |
| Loss | 2–4 | Nov 1994 | Buenos Aires, Argentina | World Series | Clay | (Spain) Àlex Corretja | 3–6, 7–5, 6–7^{(5–7)} |
| Loss | 2–5 | Apr 1995 | Paget, Bermuda | World Series | Clay | (Colombia) Mauricio Hadad | 6–7^{(7–5)}, 6–3, 4–6 |
| Loss | 2–6 | May 1995 | Pinehurst, United States | World Series | Clay | (Sweden) Thomas Enqvist | 3–6, 6–3, 3–6 |
| Win | 3–6 | Jun 1995 | Nottingham, United Kingdom | World Series | Grass | (Australia) Todd Woodbridge | 7–6^{(7–4)}, 6–3 |

=== Doubles: 16 (7 titles, 9 runner-ups) ===
| Legend Grand Slam Tournaments (0–1) ATP World Tour Finals (0–0) ATP Masters Series (0–0) ATP Championship Series (0–0) ATP World Series (7–8) | Finals by surface Hard (2–3) Clay (3–4) Grass (1–2) Carpet (1–0) | Finals by setting Outdoors (6–9) Indoors (1–0) |

| Result | W–L | Date | Tournament | Tier | Surface | Partner | Opponents | Score |
|---|---|---|---|---|---|---|---|---|
| Loss | 0–1 | Sep 1987 | Barcelona, Spain | Grand Prix | Clay | (Argentina) Christian Miniussi | (Czech Republic) Miloslav Mečíř (Czech Republic) Tomáš Šmíd | 1–6, 2–6 |
| Loss | 0–2 | Feb 1988 | Guarujá, Brazil | Grand Prix | Hard | (Uruguay) Diego Pérez | (Chile) Ricardo Acuña (United States) Luke Jensen | 1–6, 4–6 |
| Win | 1–2 | May 1988 | Florence, Italy | Grand Prix | Clay | (Argentina) Christian Miniussi | (Italy) Claudio Pistolesi (Austria) Horst Skoff | 7–6, 6–4 |
| Win | 2–2 | Feb 1990 | Guarujá, Brazil | World Series | Clay | (Argentina) Gustavo Luza | (Brazil) Luiz Mattar (Brazil) Cássio Motta | 7–6, 7–6 |
| Loss | 2–3 | Jul 1991 | Wimbledon, United Kingdom | Grand Slam | Grass | (Mexico) Leonardo Lavalle | (Australia) John Fitzgerald (Sweden) Anders Järryd | 3–6, 4–6, 7–6^{(9–7)}, 1–6 |
| Loss | 2–4 | Jul 1991 | Newport, United States | World Series | Grass | (United States) Bruce Steel | (Italy) Gianluca Pozzi (Australia) Brett Steven | 4–6, 4–6 |
| Win | 3–4 | Aug 1991 | Los Angeles, United States | World Series | Hard | (United States) Jim Pugh | (Canada) Glenn Michibata (United States) Brad Pearce | 7–5, 2–6, 6–4 |
| Loss | 3–5 | Oct 1991 | Tel Aviv, Israel | World Series | Hard | (Mexico) Leonardo Lavalle | (Czech Republic) David Rikl (Netherlands) Michiel Schapers | 2–6, 7–6, 3–6 |
| Loss | 3–6 | Nov 1991 | Búzios, Brazil | World Series | Hard | (Mexico) Leonardo Lavalle | (Spain) Sergio Casal (Spain) Emilio Sánchez | 6–4, 3–6, 4–6 |
| Loss | 3–7 | May 1992 | Bologna, Italy | World Series | Clay | (Spain) Javier Sánchez | (United States) Luke Jensen (Australia) Laurie Warder | 2–6, 3–6 |
| Loss | 3–8 | Apr 1993 | Charlotte, United States | World Series | Clay | (Mexico) Leonardo Lavalle | (Sweden) Rikard Bergh (United States) Trevor Kronemann | 1–6, 2–6 |
| Win | 4–8 | Jul 1993 | Newport, United States | World Series | Grass | (South Africa) Christo van Rensburg | (Zimbabwe) Byron Black (United States) Jim Pugh | 4–6, 6–1, 7–6 |
| Win | 5–8 | Sep 1993 | Bordeaux, France | World Series | Hard | (Argentina) Pablo Albano | (South Africa) David Adams (Russia) Andrei Olhovskiy | 7–6, 4–6, 6–3 |
| Loss | 5–9 | Nov 1993 | São Paulo, Brazil | World Series | Clay | (Argentina) Pablo Albano | (Spain) Sergio Casal (Spain) Emilio Sánchez | 6–4, 6–7, 4–6 |
| Win | 6–9 | Feb 1995 | Mexico City | World Series | Clay | (Mexico) Leonardo Lavalle | (Germany) Marc-Kevin Goellner (Italy) Diego Nargiso | 7–5, 6–3 |
| Win | 7–9 | Oct 1995 | Ostrava, Czech Republic | World Series | Carpet | (Sweden) Jonas Björkman | (France) Guy Forget (Australia) Patrick Rafter | 6–7, 6–4, 7–6 |

=== Mixed doubles (1 win) ===
| Result | W/L | Date | Tournament | Surface | Partner | Opponents | Score |
|---|---|---|---|---|---|---|---|
| Win | 1–0 | Jun 1996 | French Open, Paris, France | Clay | (Argentina) Patricia Tarabini | (United States) Luke Jensen (United States) Nicole Arendt | 6–2, 6–2 |

== ATP Challenger and ITF Futures finals ==
=== Singles: 4 (1–3) ===
| Legend ATP Challenger (1–3) ITF Futures (0–0) | Finals by surface Hard (0–1) Clay (1–1) Grass (0–1) Carpet (0–0) |

| Result | W–L | Date | Tournament | Tier | Surface | Opponent | Score |
|---|---|---|---|---|---|---|---|
| Loss | 0-1 | Oct 1990 | Curitiba, Brazil | Challenger | Hard | (Chile) Pedro Rebolledo | 1–6, 5–7 |
| Loss | 0-2 | Jul 1992 | Newcastle, United Kingdom | Challenger | Grass | (Canada) Greg Rusedski | 3–6, 6–7 |
| Win | 1-2 | Feb 1993 | Punta del Este, Uruguay | Challenger | Clay | (Argentina) Gabriel Markus | 4–6, 6–2, 7–6 |
| Loss | 1-3 | Apr 1993 | Acapulco, Mexico | Challenger | Clay | (Austria) Horst Skoff | 3–6, 6–7 |

=== Doubles: 13 (9–4) ===
| Legend ATP Challenger (9–4) ITF Futures (0–0) | Finals by surface Hard (2–1) Clay (6–3) Grass (1–0) Carpet (0–0) |

| Result | W–L | Date | Tournament | Tier | Surface | Partner | Opponents | Score |
|---|---|---|---|---|---|---|---|---|
| Win | 1–0 | Nov 1989 | Ilheus, Brazil | Challenger | Hard | (Brazil) Cássio Motta | (Spain) Sergio Casal (Spain) Javier Sánchez | 6–4, 6–2 |
| Loss | 1–1 | Dec 1989 | Brasília, Brazil | Challenger | Hard | (Argentina) Gustavo Luza | (United States) Charles Beckman (France) Jean-Philippe Fleurian | 6–4, 3–6, 0–6 |
| Win | 2–1 | Feb 1990 | São Paulo, Brazil | Challenger | Hard | (Argentina) Gustavo Luza | (Brazil) Ricardo Camargo (Brazil) Ivan Kley | 6–3, 7–6 |
| Loss | 2–2 | Aug 1990 | Lins, Brazil | Challenger | Clay | (Mexico) Agustín Moreno | (Spain) Charles Beckman (Spain) José Clavet | 6–7, 3–6 |
| Win | 3–2 | Aug 1990 | São Paulo, Brazil | Challenger | Clay | (Brazil) Cássio Motta | (Brazil) João Zwetsch (Argentina) Gabriel Markus | 6–3, 3–6, 6–1 |
| Win | 4–2 | Jul 1992 | Newcastle, United Kingdom | Challenger | Grass | (South Africa) Christo van Rensburg | (United States) Kent Kinnear (Sweden) Peter Nyborg | 7–6, 7–6 |
| Win | 5–2 | Oct 1992 | Buenos Aires, Argentina | Challenger | Clay | (Argentina) Pablo Albano | (Argentina) Horacio de la Peña (Argentina) Gabriel Markus | 2–6, 6–3, 6–4 |
| Loss | 5–3 | Apr 1993 | Acapulco, Mexico | Challenger | Clay | (Argentina) Juan-Ignacio Garat | (South Africa) Ellis Ferreira (United States) Richard Schmidt | 6–7, 4–6 |
| Win | 6–3 | Apr 1993 | San Luis Potosí, Mexico | Challenger | Clay | (Mexico) Leonardo Lavalle | (United States) Francisco Montana (United States) Bryan Shelton | 6–3, 4–6, 6–4 |
| Loss | 6–4 | Apr 1993 | Birmingham, United States | Challenger | Clay | (Argentina) Pablo Albano | (United States) Todd Witsken (United States) Bryan Shelton | 6–7, 3–6 |
| Win | 7–4 | Feb 1995 | Mar del Plata, Argentina | Challenger | Clay | (Argentina) Luis Lobo | (Spain) Jordi Burillo (Argentina) Hernán Gumy | 7–6, 6–0 |
| Win | 8–4 | Apr 1996 | Birmingham, United States | Challenger | Clay | (Czech Republic) Karel Nováček | (United States) Matt Lucena (United States) Dave Randall | 6–3, 6–1 |
| Win | 9–4 | Apr 1997 | Paget, Bermuda | Challenger | Clay | (The Bahamas) Mark Knowles | (Argentina) Lucas Arnold Ker (Argentina) Daniel Orsanic | 6–3, 6–7, 6–3 |

== Performance timelines ==
Key
| W | F | SF | QF | #R | RR | Q# | DNQ | A | NH |

(W) winner; (F) finalist; (SF) semifinalist; (QF) quarterfinalist; (#R) rounds 4, 3, 2, 1; (RR) round-robin stage; (Q#) qualification round; (DNQ) did not qualify; (A) absent; (NH) not held; (SR) strike rate (events won / competed); (W–L) win–loss record.

=== Singles ===
| Tournament | 1987 | 1988 | 1989 | 1990 | 1991 | 1992 | 1993 | 1994 | 1995 | 1996 | 1997 | SR | W–L | Win % |
|---|---|---|---|---|---|---|---|---|---|---|---|---|---|---|
Grand Slam tournaments
| Australian Open | 3R | A | A | A | 1R | 1R | A | A | A | 2R | 2R | 0 / 5 | 4–5 | 44% |
| French Open | A | A | A | A | A | 1R | 1R | 4R | 1R | 1R | 1R | 0 / 6 | 3–6 | 33% |
| Wimbledon | Q2 | 2R | 2R | Q2 | 3R | 1R | 3R | 3R | 3R | 1R | 2R | 0 / 9 | 11–9 | 55% |
| US Open | A | 1R | 1R | A | 2R | 1R | A | 4R | 1R | 1R | A | 0 / 7 | 4–7 | 36% |
| Win–loss | 2–1 | 1–2 | 1–2 | 0–0 | 3–3 | 0–4 | 2–2 | 8–3 | 2–3 | 1–4 | 2–3 | 0 / 27 | 22–27 | 45% |
Olympic Games
| Summer Olympics | NH | 2R | Not Held | | | 2R | Not Held | | | 1R | NH | 0 / 3 | 2–3 | 40% |
ATP Masters Series
| Indian Wells | A | 1R | A | A | A | 1R | A | A | A | 1R | A | 0 / 3 | 0–3 | 0% |
| Miami | A | 1R | 1R | A | A | 2R | 3R | A | A | 2R | 1R | 0 / 6 | 3–6 | 33% |
| Monte Carlo | A | A | A | A | A | 1R | A | A | A | A | A | 0 / 1 | 0–1 | 0% |
| Rome | A | A | 1R | A | A | A | A | A | A | A | A | 0 / 1 | 0–1 | 0% |
| Cincinnati | A | 1R | 2R | A | A | A | A | A | A | A | A | 0 / 2 | 1–2 | 33% |
| Win–loss | 0–0 | 0–3 | 1–3 | 0–0 | 0–0 | 1–3 | 2–1 | 0–0 | 0–0 | 0–2 | 0–1 | 0 / 13 | 4–13 | 24% |

=== Doubles ===
| Tournament | 1987 | 1988 | 1989 | 1990 | 1991 | 1992 | 1993 | 1994 | 1995 | 1996 | 1997 | SR | W–L | Win % |
|---|---|---|---|---|---|---|---|---|---|---|---|---|---|---|
Grand Slam tournaments
| Australian Open | 1R | A | A | A | 2R | 1R | A | A | A | 2R | 1R | 0 / 5 | 2–5 | 29% |
| French Open | A | 2R | A | 2R | SF | 3R | 3R | 1R | 1R | QF | 1R | 0 / 9 | 13–9 | 59% |
| Wimbledon | 1R | 1R | SF | SF | F | 3R | 2R | 2R | 1R | 1R | A | 0 / 10 | 17–10 | 63% |
| US Open | A | A | 2R | 2R | 3R | 2R | A | A | A | A | A | 0 / 4 | 5–4 | 56% |
| Win–loss | 0–2 | 1–2 | 5–2 | 6–3 | 12–4 | 5–4 | 3–2 | 1–2 | 0–2 | 4–3 | 0–2 | 0 / 28 | 37–28 | 57% |
Olympic Games
| Summer Olympics | NH | 1R | Not Held | | | SF | Not Held | | | 1R | NH | 0 / 3 | 4–3 | 57% |
ATP Masters Series
| Indian Wells | A | 1R | A | A | A | 1R | A | A | A | 1R | A | 0 / 3 | 0–3 | 0% |
| Miami | A | 1R | 1R | A | 2R | 3R | 1R | A | A | 2R | 2R | 0 / 7 | 4–7 | 36% |
| Monte Carlo | A | A | A | A | A | QF | A | A | A | A | A | 0 / 1 | 2–1 | 67% |
| Hamburg | A | A | A | 2R | A | A | A | A | A | A | A | 0 / 1 | 1–1 | 50% |
| Rome | 1R | A | QF | QF | A | A | A | A | A | A | A | 0 / 3 | 4–3 | 57% |
| Cincinnati | A | 2R | SF | A | 2R | A | A | A | A | A | A | 0 / 3 | 5–3 | 63% |
| Win–loss | 0–1 | 1–3 | 5–3 | 3–2 | 2–2 | 2–3 | 0–1 | 0–0 | 0–0 | 1–2 | 1–1 | 0 / 18 | 15–18 | 45% |

=== Mixed doubles ===
| Tournament | 1990 | 1991 | 1992 | 1993 | 1994 | 1995 | 1996 | 1997 | SR | W–L | Win % |
|---|---|---|---|---|---|---|---|---|---|---|---|
Grand Slam tournaments
| Australian Open | A | 1R | 1R | A | A | A | 1R | A | 0 / 3 | 0–3 | 0% |
| French Open | 3R | 1R | 2R | A | A | A | W | 3R | 1 / 5 | 11–4 | 73% |
| Wimbledon | A | A | 3R | 1R | 3R | 2R | A | A | 0 / 4 | 5–4 | 56% |
| US Open | A | A | A | A | A | A | A | A | 0 / 0 | 0–0 | – |
| Win–loss | 2–1 | 0–2 | 3–3 | 0–1 | 2–1 | 1–1 | 6–1 | 2–1 | 1 / 12 | 16–11 | 59% |
