= Bryan Shelton =

American tennis coach & player (born 1965)

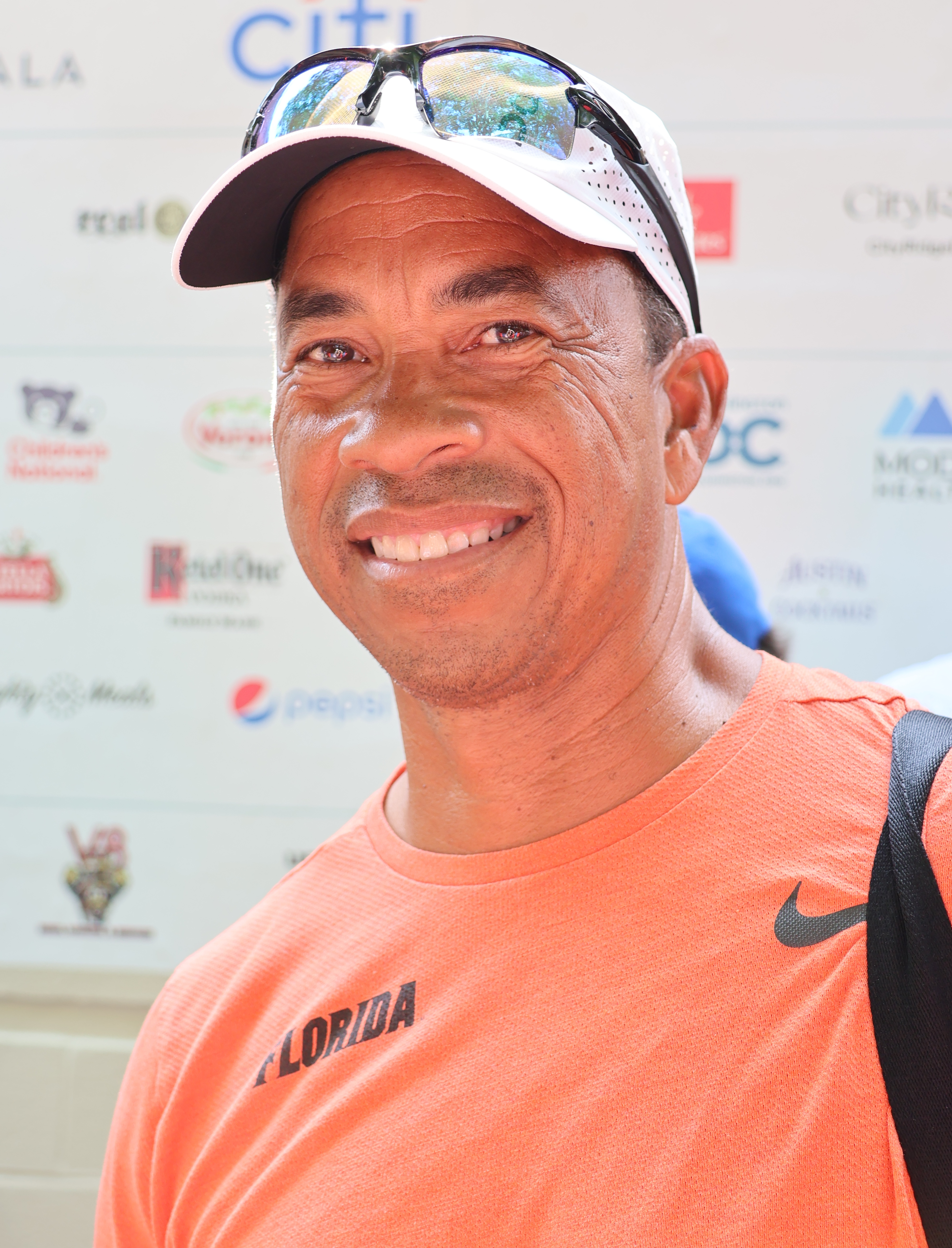
- Shelton in 2023
- Country (sports): United States
- Residence: Gainesville, Florida, U.S.
- Born: December 22, 1965 (age 60) Huntsville, Alabama, U.S.
- Height: 1.85 m (6 ft 1 in)
- Turned pro: 1989
- Retired: 1997
- Plays: Right-handed (two-handed backhand)
- Prize money: US$1,220,283

Singles
- Career record: 104–137
- Career titles: 2
- Highest ranking: No. 55 (March 23, 1992)

Grand Slam singles results
- Australian Open: 2R (1991)
- French Open: 2R (1994)
- Wimbledon: 4R (1994)
- US Open: 2R (1989)

Doubles
- Career record: 94–129
- Career titles: 2
- Highest ranking: No. 52 (February 28, 1994)

Grand Slam doubles results
- Australian Open: 2R (1991, 1994)
- French Open: 3R (1990)
- Wimbledon: 3R (1994)
- US Open: 2R (1992, 1993, 1994)

Mixed doubles
- Career titles: 0

Grand Slam mixed doubles results
- Australian Open: 2R (1991)
- French Open: F (1992)
- Wimbledon: SF (1992)
- US Open: QF (1992)

Bryan Shelton (born December 22, 1965) is an American former professional tennis player and coach. During his playing career, he won two singles and two doubles ATP tour titles, and reached the mixed doubles final at the 1992 French Open, partnering with Lori McNeil. Shelton played collegiately for Georgia Tech from 1985 to 1988, and then played professionally from 1989 to 1997.

Following his retirement from the sport, Shelton returned to his alma mater to coach the Georgia Tech Yellow Jackets women's tennis team, which won the NCAA Women's Tennis Championship in 2007. He then served as the head coach of the Florida Gators men's tennis team of the University of Florida, which he coached to the 2021 NCAA Championship. He is the only head coach to have won a national championship in both men and women's NCAA Division I Tennis.

In 2023, Shelton retired from collegiate coaching to coach his son, Ben Shelton, for the latter's professional career.

== Early years ==
Shelton was born in Huntsville, Alabama. For high school, he attended Randolph School in Huntsville. He played for the Randolph Raiders boys' tennis team, and won the Alabama high school singles championship in 1982–1984.

== College career ==
Shelton accepted an athletic scholarship to attend the Georgia Institute of Technology in Atlanta, Georgia, where he played for the Georgia Tech Yellow Jackets men's tennis team from 1985 to 1988. Shelton was the Atlantic Coast Conference (ACC) champion in singles in 1985, and he and teammate Richy Gilbert were the ACC champions in doubles 1986. He was recognized as an All-ACC selection during each of his four seasons as a Yellow Jacket, and was named an All-American in 1988. Shelton won the United States Amateur Championships in 1985. He graduated from Georgia Tech with a Bachelor of Science degree in industrial engineering in 1989, and was inducted into the Georgia Tech Athletics Hall of Fame in 1993.

== Professional career ==
Shelton won two singles titles (Newport, 1991 and 1992) during his professional career. He also reached the mixed doubles final at the 1992 French Open, partnering Lori McNeil. The right-hander reached his highest individual ranking on the ATP Tour on March 23, 1992, when he became number 55 in the world; his highest doubles ranking, 52, occurred on February 28, 1994. He was inducted into the Huntsville-Madison County Athletic Hall of Fame in 2006.

== Grand Slam finals ==
=== Mixed doubles: 1 (1 runner-up) ===
Result	Year	Championship	Surface	Partner	Opponents	Score
Loss	1992	French Open	Clay	(United States) Lori McNeil	(Spain) Arantxa Sánchez Vicario (Australia) Mark Woodforde	6–2, 6–3

== Coaching ==
Shelton officially retired from the professional tour in 1997, and was named a United States Tennis Association (USTA) National Coach, a position he held from January 1998 until June 1999. Shelton coached MaliVai Washington, a 1996 Wimbledon finalist.

Shelton became head coach of the Georgia Tech Yellow Jackets women's tennis team in July 1999. In his first season as coach at Georgia Tech, his team went to the second round of the NCAA tournament, upsetting the No. 25 Washington Huskies before falling to the No. 9 UCLA Bruins. He was named ACC Coach of the Year in 2002, 2005, and 2007. His 2007 team won the Yellow Jackets' third-straight ACC Championship. They then won Georgia Tech's first NCAA-recognized team championship on May 22, 2007, by defeating UCLA in the finals of the NCAA Women's Tennis Championship. Prior to his coaching tenure, the Georgia Tech women's tennis team had never qualified for the NCAA tournament. Shelton was named the Intercollegiate Tennis Association (ITA) Coach of the Year in 2007.

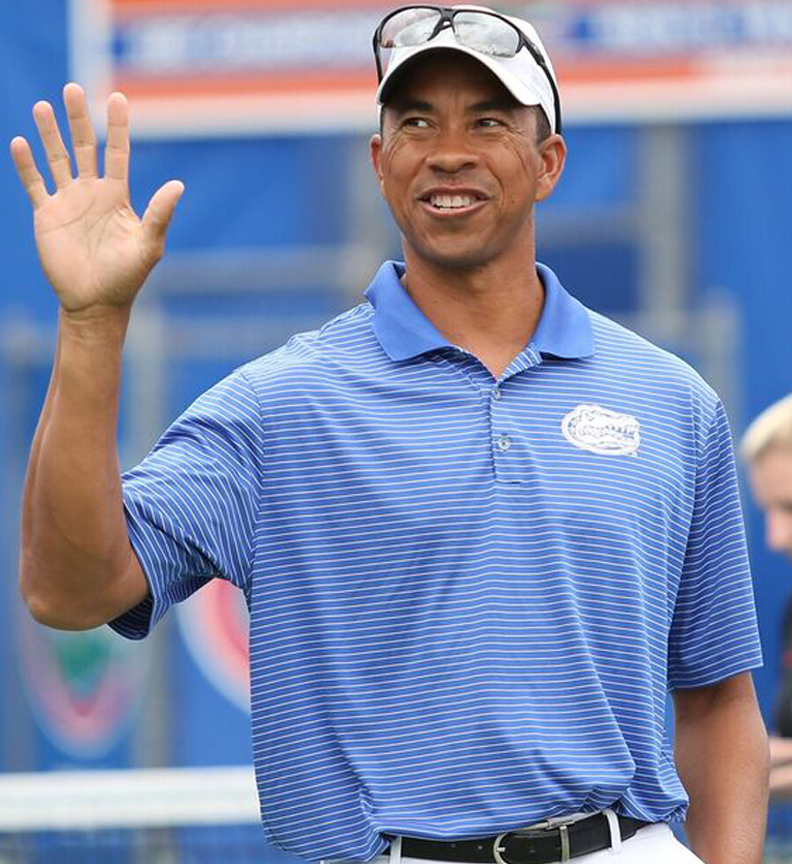
Shelton in 2016

On June 8, 2012, the University of Florida announced that Shelton had been hired as the new head coach of the Florida Gators men's tennis team.

On June 2, 2023, Shelton announced that he was stepping down from his coaching position.

== Head coaching record ==
Record table
Season	Team	Overall	Conference	Standing	Postseason
Georgia Tech (Atlantic Coastal Conference) (2000–2012)
2000	Georgia Tech	14–8	4–4	T-4th	NCAA Second Round
2001	Georgia Tech	11–12	4–4	5th	NCAA First Round
2002	Georgia Tech	15–10	3–5	4th	NCAA Second Round
2003	Georgia Tech	14–7	5–3	4th	NCAA Second Round
2004	Georgia Tech	12–11	4–4	T-4th	NCAA Second Round
2005	Georgia Tech	21–4	9–1	T-1st	NCAA Round of 16
2006	Georgia Tech	23–6	9–2	T-1st	NCAA Round of 16
2007	Georgia Tech	29–4	10–1	T-1st	NCAA Champions
2008	Georgia Tech	22–6	10–1	T-1st	NCAA Elite Eight
2009	Georgia Tech	18–8	9–2	T-3rd	NCAA Round of 16
2010	Georgia Tech	19–10	5–5	7th	NCAA Second Round
2011	Georgia Tech	13–10	5–6	T-7th	NCAA Round of 16
2012	Georgia Tech	16–12	6–5	6th	NCAA Round of 16
Georgia Tech:		227–108 (.678)	83–43 (.659)		
Florida Gators (Southeastern Conference) (2013–2023)
2013	Florida	15–11	7–5	T-3rd	NCAA First Round
2014	Florida	17–10	8–4	4th	NCAA Round of 16
2015	Florida	14–9	8–4	T-4th	NCAA First Round
2016	Florida	21–7	10–2	2nd	NCAA Elite Eight
2017	Florida	19–10	9–3	3rd	NCAA Round of 16
2018	Florida	19–10	9–3	3rd	NCAA Elite Eight
2019	Florida	25–4	12–0	1st	NCAA Final Four
2020	Florida	15–3	3–1	N/A	NCAA season canceled due to COVID-19
2021	Florida	26–2	12–0	1st	NCAA Champions
2022	Florida	23–2	12–0	1st	NCAA Elite Eight
2023	Florida	14–14	5–7	T-7th	NCAA First Round
Florida:		208–82 (.717)	84–25 (.771)		
Total:		435–190 (.696)			
National champion Postseason invitational champion Conference regular season champion Conference regular season and conference tournament champion Division regular season champion Division regular season and conference tournament champion Conference tournament champion

== ATP career finals ==
=== Singles (2 titles, 1 runner-up) ===
Legend Grand Slam (0) Tennis Masters Cup (0) ATP Masters Series (0) ATP Tour (2)	Titles by surface Hard (0) Clay (0) Grass (2) Carpet (0)

Result	W/L	Date	Tournament	Surface	Opponent	Score
Win	1–0	Jul 1991	Newport, U.S.	Grass	(Argentina) Javier Frana	3–6, 6–4, 6–4
Win	2–0	Jul 1992	Newport, U.S.	Grass	(Austria) Alex Antonitsch	6–4, 6–4
Loss	2–1	May 1993	Atlanta, U.S.	Clay	(Netherlands) Jacco Eltingh	6–7^{(1–7)}, 2–6

=== Doubles (2 titles, 1 runner-up) ===
Legend Grand Slam (0) Tennis Masters Cup (0) ATP Masters Series (0) ATP Tour (2)	Titles by surface Hard (1) Clay (1) Grass (0) Carpet (0)

Result	W/L	Date	Tournament	Surface	Partner	Opponents	Score
Loss	0–1	Jul 1990	Newport, U.S.	Grass	(United States) Todd Nelson	(Australia) Darren Cahill (Australia) Mark Kratzmann	6–7, 2–6
Win	1–1	Feb 1994	Mexico City, Mexico	Clay	(United States) Francisco Montana	(United States) Luke Jensen (United States) Murphy Jensen	6–3, 6–4
Win	2–1	Dec 1996	Adelaide, Australia	Hard	(Australia) Patrick Rafter	(Australia) Todd Woodbridge (Australia) Mark Woodforde	6–4, 1–6, 6–3

== Singles performance timeline ==
Key
W	F	SF	QF	#R	RR	Q#	DNQ	A	NH

(W) winner; (F) finalist; (SF) semifinalist; (QF) quarterfinalist; (#R) rounds 4, 3, 2, 1; (RR) round-robin stage; (Q#) qualification round; (DNQ) did not qualify; (A) absent; (NH) not held; (SR) strike rate (events won / competed); (W–L) win–loss record.

Tournament	1989	1990	1991	1992	1993	1994	1995	1996	1997	Career SR
Australian Open	A	A	2R	1R	1R	1R	1R	A	1R	0 / 6
French Open	A	A	A	1R	1R	2R	1R	A	A	0 / 4
Wimbledon	1R	3R	A	3R	2R	4R	2R	A	A	0 / 6
U.S. Open	2R	1R	1R	1R	1R	1R	1R	A	A	0 / 7
Grand Slam SR	0 / 2	0 / 2	0 / 2	0 / 4	0 / 4	0 / 4	0 / 4	0 / 0	0 / 1	0 / 23

== Personal life ==
He is the father of tennis star Ben Shelton.

== See also ==
- Florida Gators
- History of the University of Florida
- Georgia Tech Yellow Jackets
- List of Georgia Institute of Technology athletes
- Roland Thornqvist
- University Athletic Association
