= 1988 Buenos Aires Grand Prix – Doubles =

Doubles
- 1988 Buenos Aires Grand Prix

Final
- Champions: (Spain) Carlos Costa (Spain) Javier Sánchez
- Runners-up: (Argentina) Eduardo Bengoechea (Argentina) José Luis Clerc
- Score: 6–3, 3–6, 6–3

Events
Singles	Doubles
← 1987 ·	Buenos Aires Grand Prix	· 1993 →

Tomás Carbonell and Sergio Casal were the defending champions, but did not participate this year.

Carlos Costa and Javier Sánchez won the title, defeating Eduardo Bengoechea and José Luis Clerc 6–3, 3–6, 6–3 in the final.

== Seeds ==
1. (Argentina) Javier Frana / (Argentina) Christian Miniussi (quarterfinals)
2. (Argentina) Alberto Mancini / (Uruguay) Diego Pérez (first round)
3. (Argentina) Gustavo Luza / (Argentina) Guillermo Pérez Roldán (quarterfinals)
4. (Sweden) Christer Allgårdh / (Chile) Pedro Rebolledo (semifinals)

== Draw ==
=== Key ===
- Q = Qualifier
- WC = Wild card
- LL = Lucky loser
- Alt = Alternate
- ITF = ITF entry
- PR = Protected ranking
- SR = Special ranking
- SE = Special exempt
- JE = Junior exempt
- JR = Junior Accelerator Programme entrant
- CO = College Accelerator Programme entrant
- NG = Next Gen Accelerator Program entrant
- w/o = Walkover
- r = Retired
- d = Defaulted

=== Draw ===
First round
1	(Argentina) J Frana (Argentina) C Miniussi	6	6
(Argentina) G Giussani (Argentina) G Rivas	3	4
(Argentina) E Bengoechea (Argentina) JL Clerc	6	7
(Argentina) G Garetto (Argentina) G Tiberti	3	5
4	(Sweden) C Allgårdh (Chile) P Rebolledo	6	6
(Brazil) J Daher (Brazil) F Roese	4	1
(United States) J Gurfein (Brazil) M Hennemann	2	3
(United States) J Berger (Argentina) H de la Peña	6	6
(Argentina) P Albano (Argentina) M Ingaramo	2	6
(Chile) C Araya (Spain) F Roig	6	7
(Spain) F Clavet (Ecuador) R Viver	2	7	3
3	(Argentina) G Luza (Argentina) G Pérez Roldán	6	6	6
(Spain) J Aguilera (Spain) V Solves	6	1
(Argentina) R Argüello (Argentina) G Mirad	7	6
(Spain) C Costa (Spain) J Sánchez	6	4	6
2	(Argentina) A Mancini (Uruguay) D Pérez	3	6	4

Quarterfinals
1	(Argentina) J Frana (Argentina) C Miniussi	6	6	6
(Argentina) E Bengoechea (Argentina) JL Clerc	7	4	7
4	(Sweden) C Allgårdh (Chile) P Rebolledo	6	4	6
(United States) J Berger (Argentina) H de la Peña	4	6	3
(Chile) C Araya (Spain) F Roig	6	2	6
3	(Argentina) G Luza (Argentina) G Pérez Roldán	3	6	3
(Argentina) R Argüello (Argentina) G Mirad	7	3	4
(Spain) C Costa (Spain) J Sánchez	5	6	6

Semifinals
(Argentina) E Bengoechea (Argentina) JL Clerc	6	6
4	(Sweden) C Allgårdh (Chile) P Rebolledo	4	3
(Chile) C Araya (Spain) F Roig	3	6
(Spain) C Costa (Spain) J Sánchez	6	7

Final
(Argentina) E Bengoechea (Argentina) JL Clerc	3	6	3
(Spain) C Costa (Spain) J Sánchez	6	3	6
