= 1988 Buenos Aires Grand Prix – Singles =

Singles
- 1988 Buenos Aires Grand Prix

Final
- Champion: (Spain) Javier Sánchez
- Runner-up: (Argentina) Guillermo Pérez Roldán
- Score: 6–2, 7–6

Details
- Draw: 32
- Seeds: 8

Events
Singles	Doubles
← 1987 ·	Buenos Aires Grand Prix	· 1993 →

Javier Sánchez defeated Guillermo Pérez Roldán 6–2, 7–6 to win the 1988 Buenos Aires Grand Prix singles competition. Perez-Roldan was the defending champion.

== Seeds ==
1. (Argentina) Guillermo Pérez Roldán (final)
2. (United States) Jay Berger (quarterfinals)
3. (Argentina) Alberto Mancini (semifinals)
4. (Argentina) Horacio de la Peña (second round)
5. (Argentina) Eduardo Bengoechea (quarterfinals)
6. (Argentina) Franco Davín (first round)
7. (Spain) Javier Sánchez (champion)
8. (Ecuador) Raúl Viver (first round)

== Draw ==
=== Key ===
- Q = Qualifier
- WC = Wild card
- LL = Lucky loser
- Alt = Alternate
- SE = Special exempt
- PR = Protected ranking
- ITF = ITF entry
- JE = Junior exempt
- w/o = Walkover
- r = Retired
- d = Defaulted
- SR = Special ranking

=== Finals ===
Semifinals
1	(Argentina) Guillermo Pérez Roldán	6	7
3	(Argentina) Alberto Mancini	3	6
(Spain) Juan Aguilera	4	0
7	(Spain) Javier Sánchez	6	6

Final
1	(Argentina) Guillermo Pérez Roldán	2	6
7	(Spain) Javier Sánchez	6	7

=== Top half ===
First round
1	(Argentina) G Pérez Roldán	6	6
(Sweden) C Allgårdh	3	1
(Chile) P Rebolledo	6	2	3
Q	(Spain) J Clavet	4	6	6
(Argentina) R Argüello	6	6
(Argentina) F Yunis	4	2
WC	(Argentina) M Stringari	7	6	6
8	(Ecuador) R Viver	6	7	4
3	(Argentina) A Mancini	6	6
(Brazil) J Daher	4	1
Q	(Spain) F Clavet	6	6
WC	(Argentina) G Garetto	2	0
Q	(Spain) F Roig	6	6
(Argentina) C Miniussi	4	1
(Argentina) G Rivas	1	4
5	(Argentina) E Bengoechea	6	6

Second round
1	(Argentina) G Pérez Roldán	6	6
Q	(Spain) J Clavet	1	2
(Argentina) R Argüello	6	7
WC	(Argentina) M Stringari	3	6
3	(Argentina) A Mancini	7	6
Q	(Spain) F Clavet	5	2
Q	(Spain) F Roig	1	4
5	(Argentina) E Bengoechea	6	6

Quarterfinals
1	(Argentina) G Pérez Roldán	6	6
(Argentina) R Argüello	3	1
3	(Argentina) A Mancini	6	6
5	(Argentina) E Bengoechea	3	4

Semifinals
1	(Argentina) G Pérez Roldán	6	7
3	(Argentina) A Mancini	3	6

=== Bottom half ===
First round
6	(Argentina) F Davín	3	5
(Spain) J Aguilera	6	7
(Argentina) R Azar	6	6
WC	(Argentina) A Garizzio	1	0
(Argentina) J Frana	4	7	3
Q	(Spain) C Costa	6	5	6
(West Germany) M Rackl	4	5
4	(Argentina) H de la Peña	6	7
7	(Spain) J Sánchez	6	6
(Argentina) M Ingaramo	2	3
LL	(United States) J Gurfein	4	2
(Argentina) G Giussani	6	6
(Uruguay) D Pérez	5	7	6
(Brazil) M Hennemann	7	6	2
(Brazil) F Roese	3	0
2	(United States) J Berger	6	6

Second round
(Spain) J Aguilera	6	6
(Argentina) R Azar	2	2
Q	(Spain) C Costa	7	6
4	(Argentina) H de la Peña	5	2
7	(Spain) J Sánchez	7	7
(Argentina) G Giussani	6	6
(Uruguay) D Pérez	7	6	2
2	(United States) J Berger	5	7	6

Quarterfinals
(Spain) J Aguilera	6	6
Q	(Spain) C Costa	2	4
7	(Spain) J Sánchez	6	3	6
2	(United States) J Berger	3	6	3

Semifinals
(Spain) J Aguilera	4	0
7	(Spain) J Sánchez	6	6
