= 1987 Buenos Aires Grand Prix – Doubles =

Doubles
- 1987 Buenos Aires Grand Prix

Final
- Champions: (Spain) Tomás Carbonell (Spain) Sergio Casal
- Runners-up: (United States) Jay Berger (Argentina) Horacio de la Peña
- Score: W/O

Events
Singles	Doubles
← 1986 ·	Buenos Aires Grand Prix	· 1988 →

Loïc Courteau and Horst Skoff were the defending champions, but did not participate this year (1987).

Tomás Carbonell and Sergio Casal won the title after finalists Jay Berger and Horacio de la Peña withdrew prior to the championship match.

== Seeds ==
1. (Chile) Hans Gildemeister / (Brazil) Cássio Motta (semifinals)
2. (Argentina) Javier Frana / (Argentina) Christian Miniussi (first round)
3. (Chile) Ricardo Acuña / (Peru) Carlos di Laura (first round)
4. (Spain) Tomás Carbonell / (Spain) Sergio Casal (champions)

== Draw ==
=== Key ===
- Q = Qualifier
- WC = Wild card
- LL = Lucky loser
- Alt = Alternate
- ITF = ITF entry
- PR = Protected ranking
- SR = Special ranking
- SE = Special exempt
- JE = Junior exempt
- JR = Junior Accelerator Programme entrant
- CO = College Accelerator Programme entrant
- NG = Next Gen Accelerator Program entrant
- w/o = Walkover
- r = Retired
- d = Defaulted

=== Draw ===
First round
1	(Chile) H Gildemeister (Brazil) C Motta	6	6	7
(Peru) P Arraya (Argentina) G Pérez Roldán	7	4	6
(Argentina) G Guerrero (West Germany) H Schwaier	6	7
(Argentina) G Garetto (Chile) M Rodríguez	1	6
4	(Spain) T Carbonell (Spain) S Casal	7	6
(Argentina) E Bengoechea (Argentina) G Luza	5	2
(Uruguay) M Filippini (Argentina) A Mancini	6	2
(Argentina) M Jaite (Spain) J Sánchez	7	6
WC	(United States) J Berger (Argentina) H de la Peña	6	6
LL	(Argentina) P Albano (Argentina) C Castellan	1	4
(Spain) J Aguilera (Spain) A Tous	6	7
3	(Chile) R Acuña (Peru) C di Laura	1	5
(Chile) P Rebolledo (Brazil) S Ribeiro	6	3	6
(Argentina) R Argüello (Argentina) G Rivas	4	6	2
(Argentina) M Ingaramo (Argentina) G Tiberti	6	6
2	(Argentina) J Frana (Argentina) C Miniussi	4	3

Quarterfinals
1	(Chile) H Gildemeister (Brazil) C Motta	6	7
(Argentina) G Guerrero (West Germany) H Schwaier	4	5
4	(Spain) T Carbonell (Spain) S Casal	6	6
(Argentina) M Jaite (Spain) J Sánchez	3	3
WC	(United States) J Berger (Argentina) H de la Peña	6	7
(Spain) J Aguilera (Spain) A Tous	2	5
(Chile) P Rebolledo (Brazil) S Ribeiro	6	3
(Argentina) M Ingaramo (Argentina) G Tiberti	7	6

Semifinals
1	(Chile) H Gildemeister (Brazil) C Motta	1	6	1
4	(Spain) T Carbonell (Spain) S Casal	6	3	6
WC	(United States) J Berger (Argentina) H de la Peña	6	7
(Argentina) M Ingaramo (Argentina) G Tiberti	4	5

Final
4	(Spain) T Carbonell (Spain) S Casal	w/o
WC	(United States) J Berger (Argentina) H de la Peña
