= 1993 Sul America Open – Doubles =

Doubles
- 1993 Sul America Open

Final
- Champions: (Spain) Sergio Casal (Spain) Emilio Sánchez
- Runners-up: (Argentina) Pablo Albano (Argentina) Javier Frana
- Score: 4–6, 7–6, 6–4

Details
- Draw: 16 (2WC/1Q)
- Seeds: 4

Events
Singles	Doubles
- ATP São Paulo

The doubles competition of the 1993 Sul America Open was part of a men's tennis tournament played on outdoor clay courts at the Esporte Clube Pinheiros in São Paulo, Brazil. It was part of the World Series category of the 1993 ATP Tour.

Diego Pérez and Francisco Roig were the defending champions, but Pérez did not compete this year. Roig teamed up with Tomás Carbonell and lost in the first round to Donald Johnson and John Sullivan.

Sergio Casal and Emilio Sánchez won the title by defeating Pablo Albano and Javier Frana 4–6, 7–6, 6–4 in the final.

== Seeds ==
1. (Spain) Sergio Casal / (Spain) Emilio Sánchez (champions)
2. (Netherlands) Mark Koevermans / (United States) Greg Van Emburgh (first round)
3. (Argentina) Horacio de la Peña / (Mexico) Jorge Lozano (quarterfinals)
4. (Spain) Tomás Carbonell / (Spain) Francisco Roig (first round)

== Draw ==
Key

- Q = Qualifier
- WC = Wild card
- LL = Lucky loser
- Alt = Alternate
- ITF = ITF entry
- PR = Protected ranking
- SR = Special ranking
- SE = Special exempt
- JE = Junior exempt
- JR = Junior Accelerator Programme entrant
- CO = College Accelerator Programme entrant
- NG = Next Gen Accelerator Program entrant
- w/o = Walkover
- r = Retired
- d = Defaulted

=== Draw ===
First round
1	(Spain) S Casal (Spain) E Sánchez	6	6
WC	(Brazil) C Motta (Brazil) F Roese	3	2
Q	(Argentina) P Arnold (Argentina) D Orsanic	6	6	6
(Argentina) R Saad (South Africa) B Talbot	7	3	2
4	(Spain) T Carbonell (Spain) F Roig	5	3
(United States) D Johnson (United States) J Sullivan	7	6
(Sweden) C Allgårdh (United States) B Devening	5	4
(United States) F Montana (United States) J Pugh	7	6
(Argentina) P Albano (Argentina) J Frana	6	4	6
WC	(Brazil) D Marcelino (Brazil) F Meligeni	4	6	1
(Italy) C Brandi (Italy) F Mordegan	7	3	6
3	(Argentina) H de la Peña (Mexico) J Lozano	6	6	7
(France) JP Fleurian (South Africa) B Haygarth	1	7	3
(United States) M Bauer (Czech Republic) D Rikl	6	6	6
(Brazil) L Mattar (Brazil) J Oncins	6	3	7
2	(Netherlands) M Koevermans (United States) G Van Emburgh	3	6	6

Quarterfinals
1	(Spain) S Casal (Spain) E Sánchez	6	6
Q	(Argentina) P Arnold (Argentina) D Orsanic	2	2
(United States) D Johnson (United States) J Sullivan	4	6
(United States) F Montana (United States) J Pugh	6	7
(Argentina) P Albano (Argentina) J Frana	6	4	6
3	(Argentina) H de la Peña (Mexico) J Lozano	3	6	1
(United States) M Bauer (Czech Republic) D Rikl	7	7
(Brazil) L Mattar (Brazil) J Oncins	6	6

Semifinals
1	(Spain) S Casal (Spain) E Sánchez	6	6
(United States) F Montana (United States) J Pugh	3	1
(Argentina) P Albano (Argentina) J Frana	2	6	6
(United States) M Bauer (Czech Republic) D Rikl	6	0	2

Final
1	(Spain) S Casal (Spain) E Sánchez	4	7	6
(Argentina) P Albano (Argentina) J Frana	6	6	4
