= 1988 Ford Cup – Singles =

Singles
- 1988 Ford Cup

Final
- Champion: (United States) Jay Berger
- Runner-up: (Argentina) Horacio de la Peña
- Score: 6–4, 6–4

Details
- Draw: 32 (3WC/4Q/3LL)
- Seeds: 8

Events
Singles	Doubles
- ATP São Paulo

Jaime Yzaga was the defending champion, but lost in the quarterfinals to Horacio de la Peña.

Jay Berger won the title by defeating de la Peña 6–4, 6–4 in the final.

== Seeds ==
1. (Brazil) Luiz Mattar (first round)
2. (United States) Jay Berger (champion)
3. (Argentina) Horacio de la Peña (final)
4. (Socialist Federal Republic of Yugoslavia) Bruno Orešar (quarterfinals)
5. (Peru) Jaime Yzaga (quarterfinals)
6. (Brazil) Cássio Motta (semifinals)
7. (Spain) Javier Sánchez (first round)
8. (Argentina) Marcelo Ingaramo (first round)

== Draw ==
Key

- Q = Qualifier
- WC = Wild card
- LL = Lucky loser
- Alt = Alternate
- ITF = ITF entry
- PR = Protected ranking
- SR = Special ranking
- SE = Special exempt
- JE = Junior exempt
- JR = Junior Accelerator Programme entrant
- CO = College Accelerator Programme entrant
- NG = Next Gen Accelerator Program entrant
- w/o = Walkover
- r = Retired
- d = Defaulted

=== Finals ===
Semifinals
(United States) Dan Cassidy	6	5
3	(Argentina) Horacio de la Peña	7	7
6	(Brazil) Cássio Motta	3	5
2	(United States) Jay Berger	6	7

Final
3	(Argentina) Horacio de la Peña	4	4
2	(United States) Jay Berger	6	6

=== Top half ===
First round
1	(Brazil) L Mattar	2	2
(United States) D Cassidy	6	6
WC	(Brazil) J Oncins	7	7
Q	(Canada) M Wostenholme	6	6
Q	(Spain) F Clavet	6	6	2
WC	(Brazil) C Kist	2	7	6
(Peru) P Arraya	6	6
8	(Argentina) M Ingaramo	4	1
3	(Argentina) H de la Peña	4	6	7
(Brazil) M Menezes	6	3	6
WC	(Brazil) A Hocevar	4	2
(Chile) R Acuña	6	6
LL	(Spain) F Roig	3	6	6
(Chile) P Rebolledo	6	4	4
(Brazil) F Roese	2	1
5	(Peru) J Yzaga	6	6

Second round
(United States) D Cassidy	6	6
WC	(Brazil) J Oncins	4	3
WC	(Brazil) C Kist	2	7	7
(Peru) P Arraya	6	6	6
3	(Argentina) H de la Peña	6	6
(Chile) R Acuña	3	2
LL	(Spain) F Roig	0	1
5	(Peru) J Yzaga	6	6

Quarterfinals
(United States) D Cassidy	6	6
WC	(Brazil) C Kist	4	2
3	(Argentina) H de la Peña	6	6
5	(Peru) J Yzaga	2	3

Semifinals
(United States) D Cassidy	6	5
3	(Argentina) H de la Peña	7	7

=== Bottom half ===
First round
6	(Brazil) C Motta	6	6
LL	(United States) J Gurfein	4	4
(Brazil) D Marcelino	6	6
Q	(West Germany) M Zillner	2	3
LL	(Spain) V Solves	6	6	4
(Brazil) J Daher	7	4	6
(Sweden) C Allgårdh	7	2	1^{r}
4	(Socialist Federal Republic of Yugoslavia) B Orešar	5	6	3
7	(Spain) J Sánchez	6	0
(Portugal) N Marques	7	6
Q	(Brazil) M Hennemann	4	6	6
(Argentina) J Frana	6	4	7
(Uruguay) D Pérez	0	6	6
(Argentina) G Rivas	6	2	3
(Brazil) I Kley	0	2
2	(United States) J Berger	6	6

Second round
6	(Brazil) C Motta	6	4	6
(Brazil) D Marcelino	4	6	4
(Brazil) J Daher	3	1
4	(Socialist Federal Republic of Yugoslavia) B Orešar	6	6
(Portugal) N Marques	3	7	3
(Argentina) J Frana	6	6	6
(Uruguay) D Pérez	6	4	0
2	(United States) J Berger	3	6	6

Quarterfinals
6	(Brazil) C Motta	6	6
4	(Socialist Federal Republic of Yugoslavia) B Orešar	4	4
(Argentina) J Frana	2	3
2	(United States) J Berger	6	6

Semifinals
6	(Brazil) C Motta	3	5
2	(United States) J Berger	6	7
