= 1993 Topper South American Open – Doubles =

Doubles
- 1993 ATP Buenos Aires

Final
- Champions: (Spain) Tomás Carbonell (Spain) Carlos Costa
- Runners-up: (Spain) Sergio Casal (Spain) Emilio Sánchez
- Score: 6–4, 6–4

Events
Singles	Doubles
← 1992 ·	ATP Buenos Aires	· 1994 →

Pablo Albano and Javier Frana were the defending champions, but lost in the quarterfinals this year.

Tomás Carbonell and Carlos Costa won the title, defeating Sergio Casal and Emilio Sánchez 6–4, 6–4 in the final.

== Seeds ==
1. (Spain) Sergio Casal / (Spain) Emilio Sánchez (final)
2. (South Africa) Marcos Ondruska / (South Africa) Byron Talbot (first round)
3. N/A
4. (United States) Mike Bauer / (Czech Republic) David Rikl (first round)

== Draw ==
=== Key ===
- Q = Qualifier
- WC = Wild card
- LL = Lucky loser
- Alt = Alternate
- ITF = ITF entry
- PR = Protected ranking
- SR = Special ranking
- SE = Special exempt
- JE = Junior exempt
- JR = Junior Accelerator Programme entrant
- CO = College Accelerator Programme entrant
- NG = Next Gen Accelerator Program entrant
- w/o = Walkover
- r = Retired
- d = Defaulted

=== Draw ===
First round
1	(Spain) S Casal (Spain) E Sánchez	7	6
(United States) B Devening (United States) J Waite	6	2
(Argentina) H de la Peña (Mexico) J Lozano	6	6	7
WC	(Uruguay) D Pérez (Sweden) M Wilander	7	3	6
4	(United States) M Bauer (Czech Republic) D Rikl	4	3
Q	(Argentina) P Arnold (Argentina) D Orsanic	6	6
(Argentina) P Albano (Argentina) J Frana	7	6
(United States) D Johnson (United States) J Sullivan	6	4
(South Africa) B Haygarth (United States) G Van Emburgh	6	6
(Spain) T Carbonell (Spain) C Costa	7	7
(Italy) C Brandi (Spain) F Roig	6	6
LL	(Argentina) L Arnold (Argentina) G Etlis	0	4
(United States) F Montana (United States) J Pugh	3	6	7
WC	(Argentina) M Jaite (Argentina) C Miniussi	6	3	6
(Sweden) C Allgårdh (Venezuela) M Ruah	4	7	7
2	(South Africa) M Ondruska (South Africa) B Talbot	6	5	6

Quarterfinals
1	(Spain) S Casal (Spain) E Sánchez	2	7	6
(Argentina) H de la Peña (Mexico) J Lozano	6	6	4
Q	(Argentina) P Arnold (Argentina) D Orsanic	6	7
(Argentina) P Albano (Argentina) J Frana	2	5
(Spain) T Carbonell (Spain) C Costa	6	6	6
(Italy) C Brandi (Spain) F Roig	4	7	2
(United States) F Montana (United States) J Pugh	3	6	7
(Sweden) C Allgårdh (Venezuela) M Ruah	6	3	6

Semifinals
1	(Spain) S Casal (Spain) E Sánchez	6	5	6
Q	(Argentina) P Arnold (Argentina) D Orsanic	0	7	2
(Spain) T Carbonell (Spain) C Costa	6	6
(United States) F Montana (United States) J Pugh	1	4

Final
1	(Spain) S Casal (Spain) E Sánchez	4	4
(Spain) T Carbonell (Spain) C Costa	6	6
