= 1988 Ford Cup =

- Date: 31 October–6 November
- Edition: 3rd
- Category: Grand Prix
- Draw: 32S / 16D
- Prize money: $100,000
- Surface: Hard / outdoor
- Location: São Paulo, Brazil
- Venue: Hotel Transamerica

Champions

Singles
- (United States) Jay Berger

Doubles
- (United States) Jay Berger / (Argentina) Horacio de la Peña
- ATP São Paulo

The 1988 Ford Cup was a men's tennis tournament played on outdoor hard courts at the Hotel Transamerica in São Paulo, Brazil that was part of the 1988 Nabisco Grand Prix. It was the third edition of the tournament and took place from 31 October through 6 November 1988. Second-seeded Jay Berger won the singles title and earned $20,000 first prize money as well as 60 ATP ranking points.

== Finals ==
=== Singles ===
(United States) Jay Berger defeated (Argentina) Horacio de la Peña 6–4, 6–4

- It was Berger's only singles title of the year and the 2nd of his career.

=== Doubles ===
(United States) Jay Berger / (Argentina) Horacio de la Peña defeated (Chile) Ricardo Acuña / (Spain) Javier Sánchez 5–7, 6–4, 6–3

- It was Berger's only doubles title of his career. It was De la Peña's only doubles title of the year and the first of his career.
