= 1987 Buenos Aires Grand Prix – Singles =

Singles
- 1987 Buenos Aires Grand Prix

Final
- Champion: (Argentina) Guillermo Pérez Roldán
- Runner-up: (United States) Jay Berger
- Score: 3–2^{r}

Events
Singles	Doubles
← 1986 ·	Buenos Aires Grand Prix	· 1988 →

Guillermo Pérez Roldán defeated Jay Berger 3–2 after Berger retired to win the 1987 Buenos Aires Grand Prix singles competition. Berger was the defending champion.

== Seeds ==
1. (Argentina) Martín Jaite (quarterfinals)
2. (Argentina) Guillermo Pérez Roldán (champion)
3. (Argentina) Eduardo Bengoechea (second round)
4. (Haiti) Ronald Agénor (first round)
5. (United States) Jay Berger (final)
6. (Austria) Horst Skoff (second round)
7. (Spain) Alberto Tous (first round)
8. (West Germany) Ricki Osterthun (first round)

== Draw ==
=== Key ===
- Q = Qualifier
- WC = Wild card
- LL = Lucky loser
- Alt = Alternate
- SE = Special exempt
- PR = Protected ranking
- ITF = ITF entry
- JE = Junior exempt
- w/o = Walkover
- r = Retired
- d = Defaulted
- SR = Special ranking

=== Finals ===
Semifinals
(Peru) Pablo Arraya	6	6	4
5	(United States) Jay Berger	2	7	6
Q	(Spain) Juan Aguilera	3	1
2	(Argentina) Guillermo Pérez Roldán	6	6

Final
5	(United States) Jay Berger	2^{r}
2	(Argentina) Guillermo Pérez Roldán	3

=== Top half ===
First round
1	(Argentina) M Jaite	6	6
(Argentina) R Argüello	2	2
Q	(Argentina) M Ingaramo	4	6	6
(Argentina) C Miniussi	6	1	4
(West Germany) T Meinecke	0	3
(Chile) P Rebolledo	6	6
(Peru) P Arraya	7	4	6
7	(Spain) A Tous	5	6	3
3	(Argentina) E Bengoechea	6	6
(Argentina) F Yunis	4	0
(Argentina) H de la Peña	6	6
(Uruguay) D Pérez	3	4
(Argentina) F Davín	6	7
(Brazil) L Mattar	2	6
(Uruguay) M Filippini	4	2
5	(United States) J Berger	6	6

Second round
1	(Argentina) M Jaite	6	6
Q	(Argentina) M Ingaramo	3	1
(Chile) P Rebolledo	3	4
(Peru) P Arraya	6	6
3	(Argentina) E Bengoechea	1	6	3
(Argentina) H de la Peña	6	2	6
(Argentina) F Davín	2	6	4
5	(United States) J Berger	6	4	6

Quarterfinals
1	(Argentina) M Jaite	2	6	3
(Peru) P Arraya	6	1	6
(Argentina) H de la Peña	7	3	4
5	(United States) J Berger	6	6	6

Semifinals
(Peru) P Arraya	6	6	4
5	(United States) J Berger	2	7	6

=== Bottom half ===
First round
6	(Austria) H Skoff	2	6	7
(West Germany) H Schwaier	6	1	6
Q	(Spain) J Aguilera	6	6
(Israel) G Bloom	2	2
(Argentina) J Frana	6	6
(Spain) J Sánchez	4	2
Q	(Argentina) G Garetto	3	7	6
WC/4	(Haiti) R Agénor	6	6	4
8	(West Germany) R Osterthun	5	6
Q	(Argentina) G Guerrero	7	7
(Spain) S Casal	3	6	5
(Brazil) C Motta	6	2	7
LL	(United States) J Gurfein	2	5
WC	(Argentina) A Mancini	6	7
(Peru) C di Laura	3	0
2	(Argentina) G Pérez Roldán	6	6

Second round
6	(Austria) H Skoff	1	0
Q	(Spain) J Aguilera	6	6
(Argentina) J Frana	4	7	3
Q	(Argentina) G Garetto	6	6	6
Q	(Argentina) G Guerrero	3	3
(Brazil) C Motta	6	6
WC	(Argentina) A Mancini	3	3
2	(Argentina) G Pérez Roldán	6	6

Quarterfinals
Q	(Spain) J Aguilera	6	5	6
Q	(Argentina) G Garetto	2	7	0
(Brazil) C Motta	6	1	4
2	(Argentina) G Pérez Roldán	4	6	6

Semifinals
Q	(Spain) J Aguilera	3	1
2	(Argentina) G Pérez Roldán	6	6
