= 1993 Sul America Open – Singles =

Singles
- 1993 Sul America Open

Final
- Champion: (Spain) Alberto Berasategui
- Runner-up: (Czech Republic) Sláva Doseděl
- Score: 6–4, 6–3

Details
- Draw: 32 (3WC/2Q)
- Seeds: 8

Events
| Singles | Doubles |
- ATP São Paulo

Luiz Mattar was the defending champion, but lost in the first round to qualifier Daniel Orsanic.

Alberto Berasategui won the title by defeating Sláva Doseděl 6–4, 6–3 in the final.

== Seeds ==
1. (Peru) Jaime Yzaga (first round)
2. (Australia) Richard Fromberg (first round)
3. (Spain) Alberto Berasategui (champion)
4. (Brazil) Luiz Mattar (first round)
5. (Spain) Emilio Sánchez (second round)
6. (Morocco) Younes El Aynaoui (quarterfinals)
7. (France) Fabrice Santoro (second round)
8. (Spain) Àlex Corretja (semifinals)

== Draw ==
Key

- Q = Qualifier
- WC = Wild card
- LL = Lucky loser
- Alt = Alternate
- ITF = ITF entry
- PR = Protected ranking
- SR = Special ranking
- SE = Special exempt
- JE = Junior exempt
- JR = Junior Accelerator Programme entrant
- CO = College Accelerator Programme entrant
- NG = Next Gen Accelerator Program entrant
- w/o = Walkover
- r = Retired
- d = Defaulted

=== Finals ===
Semifinals
8 | (Spain) Àlex Corretja | 3 | 1
3 | (Spain) Alberto Berasategui | 6 | 6
(Czech Republic) Sláva Doseděl | 3 | 6 | 6
(Spain) Jordi Arrese | 6 | 4 | 4

Final
3 | (Spain) Alberto Berasategui | 6 | 6
(Czech Republic) Sláva Doseděl | 4 | 3

=== Top half ===
First round
1 | (Peru) J Yzaga | 6 | 1 | 2
(Spain) F Clavet | 3 | 6 | 6
(Spain) JF Altur | 3 | 4
Q | (Argentina) C Miniussi | 6 | 6
(France) JP Fleurian | 7^{7} | 6
(Argentina) A Mancini | 6^{5} | 3
WC | (Brazil) D Marcelino | 5 | 3
8 | (Spain) A Corretja | 7 | 6
3 | (Spain) A Berasategui | 6 | 6
WC | (Brazil) F Roese | 1 | 3
(Italy) R Furlan | 6 | 6
(Argentina) G Markus | 3 | 4
(Brazil) J Oncins | 6^{4} | 7 | 6
(Spain) J Burillo | 7^{7} | 5 | 1
WC | (Brazil) C Motta | 2 | 1
6 | (Morocco) Y El Aynaoui | 6 | 6

Second round
(Spain) F Clavet | 6 | 6
Q | (Argentina) C Miniussi | 3 | 3
(France) JP Fleurian | 1 | 2
8 | (Spain) A Corretja | 6 | 6
3 | (Spain) A Berasategui | 6 | 6
(Italy) R Furlan | 2 | 2
(Brazil) J Oncins | 2 | 6 | 3
6 | (Morocco) Y El Aynaoui | 6 | 3 | 6

Quarterfinals
(Spain) F Clavet | 2 | 0
8 | (Spain) A Corretja | 6 | 6
3 | (Spain) A Berasategui | 4 | 6 | 6
6 | (Morocco) Y El Aynaoui | 6 | 0 | 3

Semifinals
8 | (Spain) A Corretja | 3 | 1
3 | (Spain) A Berasategui | 6 | 6

=== Bottom half ===
First round
5 | (Spain) E Sánchez | 4 | 7 | 6
(Uruguay) M Filippini | 6 | 5 | 3
(Austria) G Schaller | 7 | 4 | 6
Q | (Germany) O Gross | 5 | 6 | 4
(Czech Republic) S Doseděl | 6 | 7
Q | (Portugal) J Cunha e Silva | 2 | 5
Q | (Argentina) D Orsanic | 6 | 7
4 | (Brazil) L Mattar | 1 | 5
7 | (France) F Santoro | 6 | 2 | 7
(Argentina) H de la Peña | 1 | 6 | 5
(Spain) J Arrese | 2 | 7 | 6
(Spain) T Carbonell | 6 | 5 | 3
(United States) R Weiss | 3 | 2
(Brazil) F Meligeni | 6 | 6
(Argentina) J Frana | 6 | 6
2 | (Australia) R Fromberg | 2 | 4

Second round
5 | (Spain) E Sánchez | 4 | 6 | 0
(Austria) G Schaller | 6 | 2 | 6
(Czech Republic) S Doseděl | 6 | 6
Q | (Argentina) D Orsanic | 3 | 4
7 | (France) F Santoro | 6 | 2 | 3
(Spain) J Arrese | 3 | 6 | 6
(Brazil) F Meligeni | 5 | 6 | 6
(Argentina) J Frana | 7 | 4 | 1

Quarterfinals
(Austria) G Schaller | 3 | 4
(Czech Republic) S Doseděl | 6 | 6
(Spain) J Arrese | 5 | 7 | 6
(Brazil) F Meligeni | 7 | 5 | 4

Semifinals
(Czech Republic) S Doseděl | 3 | 6 | 6
(Spain) J Arrese | 6 | 4 | 4
