= 1993 Topper South American Open – Singles =

Singles
- 1993 ATP Buenos Aires

Final
- Champion: (Spain) Carlos Costa
- Runner-up: (Spain) Alberto Berasategui
- Score: 3–6, 6–1, 6–4

Details
- Draw: 32
- Seeds: 8

Events
Singles	Doubles
← 1992 ·	ATP Buenos Aires	· 1994 →

Carlos Costa defeated Alberto Berasategui 3–6, 6–1, 6–4 to win the 1993 ATP Buenos Aires singles competition. Juan Gisbert-Schultze was the champion but did not defend his title.

== Seeds ==
1. (Czech Republic) Karel Nováček (first round)
2. (Spain) Carlos Costa (champion)
3. (Peru) Jaime Yzaga (first round)
4. (Australia) Richard Fromberg (first round)
5. (Spain) Emilio Sánchez (quarterfinals)
6. (Spain) Alberto Berasategui (final)
7. (South Africa) Marcos Ondruska (first round)
8. (Morocco) Younes El Aynaoui (quarterfinals)

== Draw ==
=== Key ===
- Q = Qualifier
- WC = Wild card
- LL = Lucky loser
- Alt = Alternate
- ITF = ITF entry
- PR = Protected ranking
- SR = Special ranking
- SE = Special exempt
- JE = Junior exempt
- JR = Junior Accelerator Programme entrant
- CO = College Accelerator Programme entrant
- NG = Next Gen Accelerator Program entrant
- w/o = Walkover
- r = Retired
- d = Defaulted

=== Finals ===
Semifinals
(Spain) Jordi Arrese	4	6	3
6	(Spain) Alberto Berasategui	6	3	6
(Argentina) Javier Frana	4	3
2	(Spain) Carlos Costa	6	6

Final
6	(Spain) Alberto Berasategui	6	1	4
2	(Spain) Carlos Costa	3	6	6

=== Top half ===
First round
1	(Czech Republic) K Nováček	4	6^{5}
(Spain) F Clavet	6	7^{7}
(Uruguay) M Filippini	3	7	4
(Spain) J Arrese	6	5	6
WC	(Sweden) M Wilander	2	6^{4}
(Spain) À Corretja	6	7^{7}
(Spain) T Carbonell	2	4
8	(Morocco) Y El Aynaoui	6	6
4	(Australia) R Fromberg	4	6^{11}
(Spain) J Burillo	6	7^{13}
(Argentina) G Markus	2	6^{6}
(Austria) G Schaller	6	7^{8}
(Argentina) H de la Peña	6^{15}	4
Q	(Uruguay) D Pérez	7^{17}	6
(Argentina) F Davín	4	2
6	(Spain) A Berasategui	6	6

Second round
(Spain) F Clavet	6	4	0
(Spain) J Arrese	3	6	6
(Spain) À Corretja	4	2
8	(Morocco) Y El Aynaoui	6	6
(Spain) J Burillo	0	1
(Austria) G Schaller	6	6
Q	(Uruguay) D Pérez	6	0	1
6	(Spain) A Berasategui	3	6	6

Quarterfinals
(Spain) J Arrese	7^{9}	5	7
8	(Morocco) Y El Aynaoui	6^{7}	7	5
(Austria) G Schaller	3	r
6	(Spain) A Berasategui	6

Semifinals
(Spain) J Arrese	4	6	3
6	(Spain) A Berasategui	6	3	6

=== Bottom half ===
First round
5	(Spain) E Sánchez	6	6
(Brazil) F Meligeni	4	3
(France) F Santoro	3	6	6
(Argentina) A Mancini	6	3	2
(Czech Republic) S Doseděl	2	3
Q	(Czech Republic) D Rikl	6	6
(Argentina) J Frana	6	7^{8}
3	(Peru) J Yzaga	4	6^{6}
7	(South Africa) M Ondruska	2	2
WC	(Argentina) D Orsanic	6	6
Q	(United States) F Montana	7^{7}	6^{6}	2
(Brazil) J Oncins	6^{4}	7^{8}	6
Q	(Spain) F Roig	6	2	7
WC	(Argentina) M Stringari	4	6	5
(Italy) R Furlan	1	6	2
2	(Spain) C Costa	6	4	6

Second round
5	(Spain) E Sánchez	5	6	6
(France) F Santoro	7	3	2
Q	(Czech Republic) D Rikl	3	7^{7}	5
(Argentina) J Frana	6	6^{4}	7
WC	(Argentina) D Orsanic	6	2	6
(Brazil) J Oncins	2	6	3
Q	(Spain) F Roig	2	2
2	(Spain) C Costa	6	6

Quarterfinals
5	(Spain) E Sánchez	7^{12}	6^{2}	0
(Argentina) J Frana	6^{10}	7^{7}	6
WC	(Argentina) D Orsanic	2	0^{r}
2	(Spain) C Costa	6	1

Semifinals
(Argentina) J Frana	4	3
2	(Spain) C Costa	6	6
