= 1985 Grand Prix de Tennis de Toulouse =

- Date: 7–13 October
- Edition: 4th
- Category: Regular Series
- Draw: 32S / 16D
- Prize money: $125,000
- Surface: Carpet / indoor
- Location: Toulouse, France

Champions

Singles
- (France) Yannick Noah

Doubles
- (Chile) Ricardo Acuña / (Switzerland) Jakob Hlasek
← 1984 ·	Grand Prix de Tennis de Toulouse	· 1986 →

The 1985 Grand Prix de Tennis de Toulouse was a men's tennis tournament played on indoor carpet courts in Toulouse, France that was part of the Regular Series of the 1985 Grand Prix tennis circuit. It was the fourth edition of the tournament and was held from 7 October until 13 October 1985. First-seeded Yannick Noah won the singles title.

== Finals ==
=== Singles ===
(France) Yannick Noah defeated (Czechoslovakia) Tomáš Šmíd, 6–4, 6–4

- It was Noah's 3rd singles title of the year and the 17th of his career.

=== Doubles ===
(Chile) Ricardo Acuña / (Switzerland) Jakob Hlasek defeated (Czechoslovakia) Pavel Složil / (Czechoslovakia) Tomáš Šmíd, 3–6, 6–2, 9–7
