= 1988 Ford Cup – Doubles =

Doubles
- 1988 Ford Cup

Final
- Champions: (United States) Jay Berger (Argentina) Horacio de la Peña
- Runners-up: (Chile) Ricardo Acuña (Spain) Javier Sánchez
- Score: 5–7, 6–4, 6–3

Details
- Draw: 16
- Seeds: 4

Events
Singles	Doubles
- ATP São Paulo

Gilad Bloom and Javier Sánchez were the defending champions, but Bloom did not compete this year.

Sánchez teamed up with Ricardo Acuña and lost in the final to Jay Berger and Horacio de la Peña. The score was 5–7, 6–4, 6–3.

== Seeds ==
1. (Argentina) Javier Frana / (Brazil) Luiz Mattar (quarterfinals)
2. (Brazil) Danilo Marcelino / (Brazil) Mauro Menezes (semifinals)
3. (Brazil) Ivan Kley / (Brazil) Fernando Roese (first round)
4. (Chile) Ricardo Acuña / (Spain) Javier Sánchez (final)

== Draw ==
Key

- Q = Qualifier
- WC = Wild card
- LL = Lucky loser
- Alt = Alternate
- ITF = ITF entry
- PR = Protected ranking
- SR = Special ranking
- SE = Special exempt
- JE = Junior exempt
- JR = Junior Accelerator Programme entrant
- CO = College Accelerator Programme entrant
- NG = Next Gen Accelerator Program entrant
- w/o = Walkover
- r = Retired
- d = Defaulted

=== Draw ===
First round
1	(Argentina) J Frana (Brazil) L Mattar	6	6	6
(Argentina) M Ingaramo (Argentina) G Rivas	7	2	3
(Sweden) C Allgårdh (Chile) P Rebolledo	3	3
(United States) J Berger (Argentina) H de la Peña	6	6
3	(Brazil) I Kley (Brazil) F Roese	4	3
(Peru) P Arraya (Peru) J Yzaga	6	6
(Brazil) D Campos (Brazil) C Kist	1	4
(United States) D Cassidy (Socialist Federal Republic of Yugoslavia) B Orešar	6	6
(Brazil) J Daher (Argentina) G Luza	6	6
(Spain) F Clavet (Spain) J Clavet	2	3
(United States) J Gurfein (Brazil) J Soares	1	2
4	(Chile) R Acuña (Spain) J Sánchez	6	6
(Brazil) G Barbosa (Brazil) R Camargo	5	3
(Japan) E Furusho (Brazil) A Hocevar	7	6
(Brazil) M Hennemann (Brazil) E Oliveira	2	6
2	(Brazil) D Marcelino (Brazil) M Menezes	6	7

Quarterfinals
1	(Argentina) J Frana (Brazil) L Mattar	5	3
(United States) J Berger (Argentina) H de la Peña	7	6
(Peru) P Arraya (Peru) J Yzaga	7	4	4
(United States) D Cassidy (Socialist Federal Republic of Yugoslavia) B Orešar	6	6	6
(Brazil) J Daher (Argentina) G Luza	6	4	0
4	(Chile) R Acuña (Spain) J Sánchez	3	6	6
(Japan) E Furusho (Brazil) A Hocevar	4	6	4
2	(Brazil) D Marcelino (Brazil) M Menezes	6	3	6

Semifinals
(United States) J Berger (Argentina) H de la Peña	6	6
(United States) D Cassidy (Socialist Federal Republic of Yugoslavia) B Orešar	3	4
4	(Chile) R Acuña (Spain) J Sánchez	6	6
2	(Brazil) D Marcelino (Brazil) M Menezes	2	3

Final
(United States) J Berger (Argentina) H de la Peña	5	6	6
4	(Chile) R Acuña (Spain) J Sánchez	7	4	3
