= Sérgio Ribeiro =

Sérgio Ribeiro may refer to:

- Sérgio Ribeiro (politician), Portuguese politician
- Sérgio Pinto Ribeiro (born 1959), Brazilian swimmer
- Sérgio Ribeiro (cyclist) (born 1980), Portuguese cyclist
- Sérginho Ribeiro (born 1985), Portuguese footballer
- Sérgio Ribeiro (footballer, born 1996), Portuguese footballer
- Sérgio Ribeiro (tennis), Brazilian tennis player
