= Cristián Araya (tennis) =

Chilean tennis player (born 1969)

- Country (sports): Chile
- Born: 15 September 1969 (age 56)
- Plays: Right-handed
- Prize money: $20,204

Singles
- Highest ranking: No. 315 (25 Sep 1989)

Doubles
- Career record: 5–7 (ATP Tour & Davis Cup)
- Highest ranking: No. 220 (23 Oct 1989)

Cristián Araya (born 15 September 1969) is a Chilean former professional tennis player.

While competing on the professional tour, Araya reached career high rankings of 315 for singles and 220 for doubles. He was a doubles semi-finalist at the 1988 Buenos Aires Grand Prix and the following year was doubles champion at a Challenger tournament in Santos. His career included three Davis Cup doubles appearances for Chile, one partnering Ricardo Acuña in 1988 and the other two with Pedro Rebolledo in 1990.

Araya is now a tennis coach based in France.

== ATP Challenger titles ==
=== Doubles: (1) ===
No.	Date	Tournament	Surface	Partner	Opponents	Score
1.	Jul 1989	Santos Challenger; Santos, Brazil	Clay	(Chile) Pedro Rebolledo	(Australia) David Macpherson (Argentina) Gerardo Mirad	6–4, 4–6, 6–4

== See also ==
- List of Chile Davis Cup team representatives
