= 1986 Grand Prix de Tennis de Toulouse – Doubles =

Doubles
- 1986 Grand Prix de Tennis de Toulouse

Final
- Champions: (Czechoslovakia) Miloslav Mečíř (Czechoslovakia) Tomáš Šmíd
- Runners-up: (Switzerland) Jakob Hlasek (Czechoslovakia) Pavel Složil
- Score: 6–2, 3–6, 6–4

Events
Singles	Doubles
← 1985 ·	Grand Prix de Tennis de Toulouse	· 1987 →

The 1986 Grand Prix de Tennis de Toulouse was a men's tennis tournament played on indoor carpet in Toulouse, France that was part of the Regular Series of the 1986 Grand Prix tennis circuit. It was the fifth edition of the tournament and was held from 6 October to 12 October.

== Seeds ==
Champion seeds are indicated in bold text while text in italics indicates the round in which those seeds were eliminated.

1. (Poland) Wojciech Fibak / (France) Guy Forget (first round)
2. (Switzerland) Jakob Hlasek / (Czechoslovakia) Pavel Složil (final)
3. (Czechoslovakia) **Miloslav Mečíř** / (Czechoslovakia) **Tomáš Šmíd (champions)**
4. (Sweden) Jan Gunnarsson / (United States) Tim Wilkison (semifinals)

== Draw ==
=== Key ===
- Q = Qualifier
- WC = Wild card
- LL = Lucky loser
- Alt = Alternate
- SE = Special exempt
- PR = Protected ranking
- ITF = ITF entry
- JE = Junior exempt
- w/o = Walkover
- r = Retired
- d = Defaulted
- SR = Special ranking

=== Finals ===
First round
1	(Poland) W Fibak (France) G Forget	4	**6**	3
(Iran) **M Bahrami** **(Uruguay) D Pérez**	**6**	3	**6**
(Brazil) **R Acioly** **(Peru) C di Laura**	**6**	**6**
(Sweden) S Eriksson (Sweden) J Svensson	3	3
3	(Czechoslovakia) **M Mečíř** **(Czechoslovakia) T Šmíd**	**6**	**6**
(West Germany) R Osterthun (West Germany) H Schwaier	3	3
(France) **C Lesage** **(France) J-M Piacentile**	6	**6**	**6**
(Peru) P Arraya (Socialist Federal Republic of Yugoslavia) M Ostoja	**7**	2	0
(Socialist Federal Republic of Yugoslavia) **I Flego** **(Nigeria) T Mmoh**	**7**	**7**
(West Germany) H Rittersbacher (Switzerland) D Utzinger	6	6
4	(Sweden) **J Gunnarsson** **(United States) T Wilkison**	**7**	**6**
(France) T Champion (France) T Tulasne	6	4
(Czechoslovakia) **S Birner** **(Czechoslovakia) M Šrejber**	**6**	6	**6**
(Czechoslovakia) L Pimek (Netherlands) M Schapers	4	**7**	3
(Switzerland) C Mezzadri (Italy) G Ocleppo	4	3
2	(Switzerland) **J Hlasek** **(Czechoslovakia) P Složil**	**6**	**6**

Quarterfinals
(Iran) **M Bahrami** **(Uruguay) D Pérez**	6	**6**	**6**
(Brazil) R Acioly (Peru) C di Laura	**7**	4	1
3	(Czechoslovakia) **M Mečíř** **(Czechoslovakia) T Šmíd**	6	**6**	**6**
(France) C Lesage (France) J-M Piacentile	**7**	2	4
(Socialist Federal Republic of Yugoslavia) I Flego (Nigeria) T Mmoh	2	3
4	(Sweden) **J Gunnarsson** **(United States) T Wilkison**	**6**	**6**
(Czechoslovakia) S Birner (Czechoslovakia) M Šrejber	6	5
2	(Switzerland) **J Hlasek** **(Czechoslovakia) P Složil**	**7**	**7**

Semifinals
(Iran) M Bahrami (Uruguay) D Pérez	3	1
3	(Czechoslovakia) **M Mečíř** **(Czechoslovakia) T Šmíd**	**6**	**6**
4	(Sweden) J Gunnarsson (United States) T Wilkison	2	**6**	2
2	(Switzerland) **J Hlasek** **(Czechoslovakia) P Složil**	**6**	4	**6**

Final
3	(Czechoslovakia) **M Mečíř** **(Czechoslovakia) T Šmíd**	**6**	3	**6**
2	(Switzerland) J Hlasek (Czechoslovakia) P Složil	2	**6**	4
