= 1995 Topper South American Open =

- Date: 6–13 November
- Edition: 24th
- Category: World Series
- Draw: 32S / 16D
- Prize money: $303,000
- Surface: Clay / outdoor
- Location: Buenos Aires, Argentina

Champions

Singles
- (Spain) Carlos Moyá

Doubles
- (United States) Vincent Spadea / (South Africa) Christo van Rensburg
← 1994 ·	ATP Buenos Aires	· 1997 →

The 1995 Topper South American Open was an Association of Tennis Professionals men's tennis tournament held in Buenos Aires, Argentina on outdoor clay courts. It was the 24th edition of the tournament and was held from 6 November though 13 November 1995. Unseeded Carlos Moyá won the singles title.

== Finals ==
=== Singles ===
(Spain) Carlos Moyá defeated (Spain) Felix Mantilla 6–0, 6–3

- It was Moyà's only singles title of the year and the 1st of his career.

=== Doubles ===
(United States) Vincent Spadea / (South Africa) Christo van Rensburg defeated (Czech Republic) Jiří Novák / (Czech Republic) David Rikl 6–3, 6–3

- It was Spadea's only title of the year and the 1st of his career. It was van Rensburg's only title of the year and the 20th of his career.
