= 1986 Grand Prix de Tennis de Toulouse – Singles =

Singles
- 1986 Grand Prix de Tennis de Toulouse

Final
- Champion: (France) Guy Forget
- Runner-up: (Sweden) Jan Gunnarsson
- Score: 4–6, 6–3, 6–2

Details
- Draw: 32
- Seeds: 8

Events
Singles	Doubles
← 1985 ·	Grand Prix de Tennis de Toulouse	· 1987 →

The 1986 Grand Prix de Tennis de Toulouse was a men's tennis tournament played on indoor carpet courts in Toulouse, France that was part of the Regular Series of the 1986 Grand Prix tennis circuit. It was the fifth edition of the tournament and was held from 6 October – 12 October.

== Seeds ==
Champion seeds are indicated in bold text while text in italics indicates the round in which those seeds were eliminated.

1. (Czechoslovakia) Miloslav Mečíř (quarterfinals)
2. (France) Thierry Tulasne (quarterfinals)
3. (United States) Tim Wilkison (first round)
4. (Switzerland) Jakob Hlasek (quarterfinals)
5. (Czechoslovakia) Milan Šrejber (semifinals)
6. (Sweden) Jonas Svensson (second round)
7. (France) **Guy Forget (champions)**
8. (Austria) Horst Skoff (first round)

== Draw ==
=== Key ===
- Q = Qualifier
- WC = Wild card
- LL = Lucky loser
- Alt = Alternate
- SE = Special exempt
- PR = Protected ranking
- ITF = ITF entry
- JE = Junior exempt
- w/o = Walkover
- r = Retired
- d = Defaulted
- SR = Special ranking

=== Finals ===
Semifinals
**(Sweden) Jan Gunnarsson**	**7**	**7**
(Uruguay) Diego Pérez	6	6
5	(Czechoslovakia) Milan Šrejber	**7**	3	2
7	**(France) Guy Forget**	6	**6**	**6**

Final
(Sweden) Jan Gunnarsson	**6**	3	2
7	**(France) Guy Forget**	4	**6**	**6**

=== Top half ===
First round
1	**(Czechoslovakia) M Mečíř**	**6**	**6**
(France) J-M Piacentile	1	2
**(France) J Potier**	**7**	**6**
(West Germany) R Osterthun	5	1
**(Sweden) J Gunnarsson**	**6**	**6**
(Socialist Federal Republic of Yugoslavia) I Flego	4	4
**(Sweden) S Eriksson**	**6**	**6**
8	(Austria) H Skoff	4	4
**(Netherlands) M Michiel Schapers**	**6**	**7**
3	(United States) T Wilkison	3	6
**(Czechoslovakia) S Birner**	**6**	**6**
(Poland) W Fibak	4	3
**(Uruguay) D Pérez**	**6**	**7**
(Sweden) H Sundström	2	5
6	**(Sweden) J Svensson**	6	**7**	**6**
(Socialist Federal Republic of Yugoslavia) M Ostoja	**7**	6	2

Second round
1	**(Czechoslovakia) M Mečíř**	**6**	**6**
(France) J Potier	2	3
**(Sweden) J Gunnarsson**	**7**	**6**
(Sweden) S Eriksson	6	2
**(Netherlands) M Michiel Schapers**	**7**	**6**
(Czechoslovakia) S Birner	5	1
**(Uruguay) D Pérez**	4	**6**	**13**
6	(Sweden) J Svensson	**6**	4	11

Quarterfinals
1	(Czechoslovakia) M Mečíř	**6**	4	**11**
**(Sweden) J Gunnarsson**	3	**6**	9
(Netherlands) M Michiel Schapers	4	4
**(Uruguay) D Pérez**	**6**	**6**

Semifinals
**(Sweden) J Gunnarsson**	**7**	**7**
(Uruguay) D Pérez	6	6

=== Bottom half ===
First round
5	**(Czechoslovakia) M Šrejber**	**6**	**6**
(Nigeria) T Mmoh	3	4
**(Peru) C di Laura**	4	**6**	**7**
(West Germany) H Rittersbacher	**6**	3	5
**(Czechoslovakia) T Šmíd**	**6**	6	**6**
(Iran) M Bahrami	3	**7**	1
4	**(Switzerland) J Hlasek**	**6**	**6**
(France) H Bardot	3	3
7	**(France) G Forget**	4	**7**	**6**
(Switzerland) C Mezzadri	**6**	5	3
**(Czechoslovakia) L Pimek**	**6**	**6**
(France) T Champion	3	4
**(United States) J Brown**	**6**	**6**
(West Germany) H Schwaier	3	4
2	**(France) T Tulasne**	**6**	4	**10**
(Peru) P Arraya	4	**6**	8

Second round
5	**(Czechoslovakia) M Šrejber**	6	**6**	**8'**
(Peru) C di Laura	**7**	3	6
(Czechoslovakia) T Šmíd	6	3
4	**(Switzerland) J Hlasek**	**7**	**6**
7	**(France) G Forget**	**6**	**7**
(Czechoslovakia) L Pimek	3	6
(United States) J Brown	6	2
2	**(France) T Tulasne**	**7**	**6**

Quarterfinals
5	**(Czechoslovakia) M Šrejber**	**6**	1	**6**
4	(Switzerland) J Hlasek	4	**6**	1
7	**(France) G Forget**	**7**	**6**
2	(France) T Tulasne	5	3

Semifinals
5	(Czechoslovakia) M Šrejber	**7**	3	2
7	**(France) G Forget**	6	**6**	**6**
