= 1988 Buenos Aires Grand Prix =

1988 Buenos Aires Grand Prix may refer to:

- 1988 Buenos Aires Grand Prix (tennis)
- 1988 Buenos Aires Grand Prix (motor racing), the Formula One race
