= 1987 Argentine Open (tennis) =

1987 Buenos Aires Grand Prix
- Date: 16–22 November
- Edition: 19th
- Category: Grand Prix
- Draw: 32S / 16D
- Prize money: $89,400
- Surface: Clay / outdoor
- Location: Buenos Aires, Argentina

Champions

Singles
- (Argentina) Guillermo Pérez Roldán

Doubles
- (Spain) Tomás Carbonell / (Spain) Sergio Casal
← 1986 ·	Buenos Aires Grand Prix	· 1988 →

The 1987 Argentine Open, also known as the Buenos Aires Grand Prix, was a Grand Prix tennis tour tournament held on outdoor clay courts in Buenos Aires, Argentina. It was the 19th edition of the tournament and was held from 16 November until 22 November 1987. Second-seeded Guillermo Pérez Roldán won the singles title.

== Finals ==
=== Singles ===
(Argentina) Guillermo Pérez Roldán defeated (United States) Jay Berger 3–2 (Berger retired)

- It was Perez-Roldan's 3rd title of the year and the 3rd of his career.

=== Doubles ===
(Spain) Tomás Carbonell / (Spain) Sergio Casal defeated (United States) Jay Berger / (Argentina) Horacio de la Peña by Walkover

- It was Carbonell's only title of the year and the 1st of his career. It was Casal's 7th title of the year and the 16th of his career.
