= 1995 Topper South American Open – Doubles =

Doubles
- 1995 Topper South American Open

Final
- Champions: (United States) Vincent Spadea (South Africa) Christo van Rensburg
- Runners-up: (Czech Republic) Jiří Novák (Czech Republic) David Rikl
- Score: 6–3, 6–3

Details
- Draw: 16
- Seeds: 4

Events
Singles	Doubles
← 1994 ·	ATP Buenos Aires	· 1996 →

Sergio Casal and Emilio Sánchez were the defending champions, but lost in the first round this year.

Vincent Spadea and Christo van Rensburg won the title, defeating Jiří Novák and David Rikl 6–3, 6–3 in the final.

== Seeds ==
1. (Argentina) Luis Lobo / (Spain) Javier Sánchez (quarterfinals)
2. (Spain) Tomás Carbonell / (Spain) Francisco Roig (semifinals)
3. (Spain) Sergio Casal / (Spain) Emilio Sánchez (first round)
4. (Czech Republic) Jiří Novák / (Czech Republic) David Rikl (final)

== Draw ==
=== Key ===
- Q = Qualifier
- WC = Wild card
- LL = Lucky loser
- Alt = Alternate
- ITF = ITF entry
- PR = Protected ranking
- SR = Special ranking
- SE = Special exempt
- JE = Junior exempt
- JR = Junior Accelerator Programme entrant
- CO = College Accelerator Programme entrant
- NG = Next Gen Accelerator Program entrant
- w/o = Walkover
- r = Retired
- d = Defaulted

=== Draw ===
First round
1	(Argentina) L Lobo (Spain) J Sánchez	6	6	6
WC	(Chile) M Ríos (Netherlands) S Schalken	3	7	4
(Spain) J Arrese (Spain) À Corretja	4	4
(Australia) J Eagle (Australia) A Florent	6	6
3	(Spain) S Casal (Spain) E Sánchez	4	4
Q	(United States) V Spadea (South Africa) C van Rensburg	6	6
WC	(Argentina) L Arnold (Argentina) H Gumy	1	4
(United States) S Cannon (United States) F Montana	6	6
(Portugal) N Marques (United States) J Waite	5	6	1
WC	(Argentina) J-L Clerc (Argentina) J Frana	7	2	6
(Portugal) E Couto (Hungary) G Köves	3	1
4	(Czech Republic) J Novák (Czech Republic) D Rikl	6	6
(South Africa) B Haygarth (United States) D Johnson	5	6	2
(United States) D Randall (United States) G Van Emburgh	7	2	6
(Spain) JA Conde (Netherlands) S Noteboom	3	0
2	(Spain) T Carbonell (Spain) F Roig	6	6

Quarterfinals
1	(Argentina) L Lobo (Spain) J Sánchez	3	6	6
(Australia) J Eagle (Australia) A Florent	6	3	7
Q	(United States) V Spadea (South Africa) C van Rensburg	6	6
(United States) S Cannon (United States) F Montana	4	2
WC	(Argentina) J-L Clerc (Argentina) J Frana	6	4	0
4	(Czech Republic) J Novák (Czech Republic) D Rikl	4	6	6
(United States) D Randall (United States) G Van Emburgh	6	2
2	(Spain) T Carbonell (Spain) F Roig	7	6

Semifinals
(Australia) J Eagle (Australia) A Florent	5	4
Q	(United States) V Spadea (South Africa) C van Rensburg	7	6
4	(Czech Republic) J Novák (Czech Republic) D Rikl	7	6
2	(Spain) T Carbonell (Spain) F Roig	5	3

Final
Q	(United States) V Spadea (South Africa) C van Rensburg	6	6
4	(Czech Republic) J Novák (Czech Republic) D Rikl	3	3
