= 1998 ATP Buenos Aires =

Tennis tournament

- Date: 16–23 November
- Edition: 26th
- Location: Buenos Aires, Argentina

Champions

Singles
- (Morocco) Younes El Aynaoui

Doubles
- (Argentina) Guillermo Cañas / (Argentina) Martín García
← 1997 ·	ATP Buenos Aires	· 1999 →

The 1998 ATP Buenos Aires was an ATP Challenger Series tennis tournament held in Buenos Aires, Argentina. The tournament was held from November 16 to November 23.

== Finals ==
=== Singles ===
(Morocco) Younes El Aynaoui defeated (Spain) Alberto Martín 7–6, 6–1

=== Doubles ===
(Argentina) Guillermo Cañas / (Argentina) Martín García defeated (Spain) Alberto Martín / (Spain) Salvador Navarro 2–6, 6–3, 7–5
