= 1999 ATP Buenos Aires =

- Date: November 15–22, 1999
- Edition: 27th

Champions

Singles
- (Argentina) Franco Squillari

Doubles
- (Argentina) Guillermo Cañas / (Argentina) Martín García
← 1998 ·	ATP Buenos Aires	· 2000 →

The 1999 ATP Buenos Aires was an ATP Challenger Series tennis tournament held in Buenos Aires, Argentina. The tournament was held November 15 to 22, 1999.

== Finals ==
=== Singles ===
(Argentina) Franco Squillari defeated (Argentina) Hernán Gumy 5–7, 6–1, 6–4

=== Doubles ===
(Argentina) Guillermo Cañas / (Argentina) Martín García defeated (South Africa) Paul Rosner / (Serbia and Montenegro) Dušan Vemić 6–4, 6–-4
