= 1994 Topper South American Open – Singles =

Singles
- 1994 ATP Buenos Aires

Final
- Champion: (Spain) Àlex Corretja
- Runner-up: (Argentina) Javier Frana
- Score: 6–3, 5–7, 7–6^{(7–5)}

Details
- Draw: 32
- Seeds: 8

Events
Singles	Doubles
← 1993 ·	ATP Buenos Aires	· 1995 →

Àlex Corretja defeated Javier Frana 6–3, 5–7, 7–6^{(7–5)} to win the 1994 ATP Buenos Aires singles competition. Carlos Costa was the defending champion.

== Seeds ==
1. (Spain) Alberto Berasategui (quarterfinals)
2. (Spain) Carlos Costa (second round)
3. (Spain) Àlex Corretja (champion)
4. (Czech Republic) Slava Doseděl (quarterfinals)
5. (Czech Republic) Karel Nováček (semifinals)
6. (Austria) Gilbert Schaller (second round)
7. (France) Fabrice Santoro (first round)
8. (Spain) Francisco Clavet (semifinals)

== Draw ==
=== Key ===
- Q = Qualifier
- WC = Wild card
- LL = Lucky loser
- Alt = Alternate
- ITF = ITF entry
- PR = Protected ranking
- SR = Special ranking
- SE = Special exempt
- JE = Junior exempt
- JR = Junior Accelerator Programme entrant
- CO = College Accelerator Programme entrant
- NG = Next Gen Accelerator Program entrant
- w/o = Walkover
- r = Retired
- d = Defaulted

=== Finals ===
Semifinals
8	(Spain) Francisco Clavet	6^{3}	6	3
3	(Spain) Àlex Corretja	7^{7}	1	6
5	(Czech Republic) Karel Nováček	5	2
(Argentina) Javier Frana	7	6

Final
3	(Spain) Àlex Corretja	6	5	7^{7}
(Argentina) Javier Frana	3	7	6^{5}

=== Top half ===
First round
1	(Spain) A Berasategui	6	6
(Sweden) L Jonsson	1	3
Q	(Argentina) G Etlis	7^{7}	6
WC	(Argentina) H Gumy	6^{3}	1
(Spain) J Burillo	2	3
(Spain) T Carbonell	6	6
Q	(Argentina) P Arnold	4	1
8	(Spain) F Clavet	6	6
3	(Spain) À Corretja	7	6
(Uruguay) M Filippini	5	0
(United States) V Spadea	3	0^{r}
(Morocco) K Alami	6	2
(Brazil) F Meligeni	5	6	0
(Brazil) L Mattar	7	4	6
(Venezuela) N Pereira	4	3
6	(Austria) G Schaller	6	6

Second round
1	(Spain) A Berasategui	4	6	6
Q	(Argentina) G Etlis	6	0	2
(Spain) T Carbonell	1	5
8	(Spain) F Clavet	6	7
3	(Spain) À Corretja	6	6
(Morocco) K Alami	2	2
(Brazil) L Mattar	6^{8}	6	6
6	(Austria) G Schaller	7^{10}	3	2

Quarterfinals
1	(Spain) A Berasategui	7^{7}	1	2
8	(Spain) F Clavet	6^{5}	6	6
3	(Spain) À Corretja	6	6
(Brazil) L Mattar	1	3

Semifinals
8	(Spain) F Clavet	6^{3}	6	3
3	(Spain) À Corretja	7^{7}	1	6

=== Bottom half ===
First round
5	(Czech Republic) K Nováček	6	2	7^{7}
(Germany) O Gross	4	6	6^{4}
WC	(Argentina) G Markus	6	6
(Colombia) M Hadad	1	2
(Chile) M Ríos	6	2
(Spain) J Arrese	3	6	6
WC	(Argentina) F Browne	6	4	4
4	(Czech Republic) S Doseděl	4	6	6
7	(France) F Santoro	4	6	5
Q	(Spain) J A Viloca	6	4	7
Q	(Argentina) F Squillari	2	6	7^{7}
(Argentina) F Davín	6	4	6^{3}
(Spain) E Sánchez	4	4
(Argentina) J Frana	6	6
(Morocco) Y El Aynaoui	6	2	4
2	(Spain) C Costa	3	6	6

Second round
5	(Czech Republic) K Nováček	7^{7}	3	6
WC	(Argentina) G Markus	6^{5}	6	3
(Spain) J Arrese	3	4
4	(Czech Republic) S Doseděl	6	6
Q	(Spain) J A Viloca	6	6
Q	(Argentina) F Squillari	4	2
(Argentina) J Frana	7	7^{7}
2	(Spain) C Costa	5	6^{2}

Quarterfinals
5	(Czech Republic) K Nováček	6	6
4	(Czech Republic) S Doseděl	1	3
Q	(Spain) J A Viloca	4	4
(Argentina) J Frana	6	6

Semifinals
5	(Czech Republic) K Nováček	5	2
(Argentina) J Frana	7	6
