= 1995 Topper South American Open – Singles =

Singles
- 1995 Topper South American Open

Final
- Champion: (Spain) Carlos Moyà
- Runner-up: (Spain) Félix Mantilla
- Score: 6–0, 6–3

Details
- Draw: 32
- Seeds: 8

Events
| Singles | Doubles |
| ← 1994 · | ATP Buenos Aires | · 1996 → |

Carlos Moyà defeated Félix Mantilla 6–0, 6–3 to win the 1995 ATP Buenos Aires singles competition. Àlex Corretja was the defending champion.

== Seeds ==
1. (Austria) Gilbert Schaller (first round)
2. (Spain) Álbert Costa (second round)
3. (Chile) Marcelo Ríos (second round)
4. (Spain) Alberto Berasategui (quarterfinals)
5. n/a
6. (Spain) Francisco Clavet (first round)
7. (Spain) Javier Sánchez (second round)
8. (Czech Republic) Bohdan Ulihrach (first round)

== Draw ==
=== Key ===
- Q = Qualifier
- WC = Wild card
- LL = Lucky loser
- Alt = Alternate
- ITF = ITF entry
- PR = Protected ranking
- SR = Special ranking
- SE = Special exempt
- JE = Junior exempt
- JR = Junior Accelerator Programme entrant
- CO = College Accelerator Programme entrant
- NG = Next Gen Accelerator Program entrant
- w/o = Walkover
- r = Retired
- d = Defaulted

=== Finals ===
Semifinals
(Czech Republic) Jiří Novák | 5 | 3
(Spain) Carlos Moyà | 7 | 6
(Spain) Àlex Corretja | 6 | 3 | 3
Q | (Spain) Félix Mantilla | 3 | 6 | 6

Final
(Spain) Carlos Moyà | 6 | 6
Q | (Spain) Félix Mantilla | 0 | 3

=== Top half ===
First round
1 | (Austria) G Schaller | 3 | 6 | 4
(Spain) J Burillo | 6 | 2 | 6
Q | (Spain) Á López Morón | 4 | 6 | 3
Q | (Spain) G Blanco | 6 | 0 | 6
(Czech Republic) D Rikl | 2 | 4
(Czech Republic) J Novák | 6 | 6
WC | (Argentina) G Etlis | 4 | 6 | 1
7 | (Spain) J Sánchez | 6 | 4 | 6
4 | (Spain) A Berasategui | 6 | 6
(Spain) J Arrese | 2 | 4
(Portugal) N Marques | 6 | 6
(Spain) T Carbonell | 3 | 1
(Brazil) F Meligeni | 2 | 2
(Morocco) K Alami | 6 | 6
(Spain) C Moyà | 6 | 6
LL | (Uruguay) M Filippini | 4 | 3

Second round
(Spain) J Burillo | 5 | 1
Q | (Spain) G Blanco | 7 | 6
(Czech Republic) J Novák | 6 | 7^{7}
7 | (Spain) J Sánchez | 0 | 6^{2}
4 | (Spain) A Berasategui | 6 | 6^{2} | 6
(Portugal) N Marques | 3 | 7^{7} | 2
(Morocco) K Alami | 4 | 6^{5}
(Spain) C Moyà | 6 | 7^{7}

Quarterfinals
Q | (Spain) G Blanco | 1 | 0
(Czech Republic) J Novák | 6 | 6
4 | (Spain) A Berasategui | 3 | 3
(Spain) C Moyà | 6 | 6

Semifinals
(Czech Republic) J Novák | 5 | 3
(Spain) C Moyà | 7 | 6

=== Bottom half ===
First round
6 | (Spain) F Clavet | 2 | 6 | 3
(United States) V Spadea | 6 | 3 | 6
WC | (Argentina) M Zabaleta | 4 | 6 | 1
(Argentina) H Gumy | 6 | 3 | 6
(Spain) À Corretja | 6 | 6
(Czech Republic) S Doseděl | 4 | 0
WC | (Argentina) F Davín | 7^{8} | 4 | 4
3 | (Czech Republic) M Ríos | 6^{6} | 6 | 6
8 | (Czech Republic) B Ulihrach | 3 | 6 | 6^{3}
(Norway) C Ruud | 6 | 4 | 7^{7}
Q | (Spain) F Mantilla | 7 | 6
(Netherlands) S Schalken | 5 | 0
Q | (United States) D Johnson | 1 | 4
(Spain) E Sánchez | 6 | 6
(Argentina) J Frana | 6^{8} | 6 | 1
2 | (Spain) Á Costa | 7^{10} | 3 | 6

Second round
(United States) V Spadea | 2 | 7 | 4
(Argentina) H Gumy | 6 | 5 | 6
(Spain) À Corretja | 3 | 6 | 6
3 | (Chile) M Ríos | 6 | 2 | 3
(Norway) C Ruud | 4 | 6^{3}
Q | (Spain) F Mantilla | 6 | 7^{7}
(Spain) E Sánchez | 7^{7} | 1 | 6
2 | (Spain) Á Costa | 6^{3} | 6 | 2

Quarterfinals
(Argentina) H Gumy | 4 | 4
(Spain) À Corretja | 6 | 6
Q | (Spain) F Mantilla | 7^{8} | 6
(Spain) E Sánchez | 6^{6} | 4

Semifinals
(Spain) À Corretja | 6 | 3 | 3
Q | (Spain) F Mantilla | 3 | 6 | 6
