= 1992 ATP Buenos Aires =

- Date: 12–19 October
- Edition: 21st
- Category: ATP Challenger Series
- Location: Buenos Aires, Argentina

Champions

Singles
- (Spain) Juan Gisbert-Schultze

Doubles
- (Argentina) Pablo Albano / (Argentina) Javier Frana
← 1988 ·	ATP Buenos Aires	· 1993 →

The 1992 ATP Buenos Aires was an ATP Challenger Series tennis tournament held in Buenos Aires, Argentina. It was the 21st edition of the tournament was held from 12 October through 19 October 1992. Juan Gisbert-Schultze won the singles title.

== Finals ==
=== Singles ===
(Spain) Juan Gisbert-Schultze defeated (Germany) Carsten Arriens 6–1, 7–6

=== Doubles ===
(Argentina) Pablo Albano / (Argentina) Javier Frana defeated (Argentina) Horacio de la Peña / (Argentina) Gabriel Markus 2–6, 6–3, 6–4
