= 1991 Banespa Open =

- Date: 4–10 November
- Edition: 6th
- Category: World Series
- Draw: 32S / 16D
- Prize money: $225,000
- Surface: Hard / outdoor
- Location: São Paulo, Brazil
- Venue: Hotel Transamerica

Champions

Singles
- (Argentina) Christian Miniussi

Doubles
- (Ecuador) Andrés Gómez / (Brazil) Jaime Oncins
- ATP São Paulo

The 1991 Banespa Open was a men's tennis tournament played on outdoor hard courts at the Hotel Transamerica in São Paulo, Brazil that was part of the World Series category of the 1991 ATP Tour. It was the sixth edition of the tournament and took place from 4 November through 10 November 1991. Unseeded Christian Miniussi, who entered the main draw as a lucky loser, won the singles title.

== Finals ==
=== Singles ===
(Argentina) Christian Miniussi defeated (Brazil) Jaime Oncins 6–4, 6–4

- It was Miniussi's only singles title of his career.

=== Doubles ===
(Ecuador) Andrés Gómez / (Brazil) Jaime Oncins defeated (Mexico) Jorge Lozano / (Brazil) Cássio Motta 6–4, 6–4

- It was Gómez's only doubles title of the year and the 32nd of his career. It was Oncins's only doubles title of the year and the first of his career.
