= 1993 Sul America Open =

- Date: 1–7 November
- Edition: 8th
- Category: World Series
- Draw: 32S / 16D
- Prize money: $175,000
- Surface: Clay / outdoor
- Location: São Paulo, Brazil
- Venue: Esporte Clube Pinheiros

Champions

Singles
- (Spain) Alberto Berasategui

Doubles
- (Spain) Sergio Casal / (Spain) Emilio Sánchez
- ATP São Paulo

The 1993 Sul America Open was a men's tennis tournament played on outdoor clay courts at the Esporte Clube Pinheiros in São Paulo, Brazil that was part of the World Series category of the 1993 ATP Tour. It was the eighth and last edition of the tournament and took place from 1 November through 7 November 1993. Third-seeded Alberto Berasategui won the singles title.

== Finals ==
=== Singles ===
(Spain) Alberto Berasategui defeated (Czech Republic) Slava Doseděl 6–4, 6–3

- It was Berasategui's only singles title of the year and the first of his career.

=== Doubles ===
(Spain) Sergio Casal / (Spain) Emilio Sánchez defeated (Argentina) Pablo Albano / (Argentina) Javier Frana 4–6, 7–6, 6–4

- It was Casal's 4th doubles title of the year and the 43rd of his career. It was Sánchez's 4th doubles title of the year and the 46th of his career.
