= 1989 Philips Open =

- Date: 6–12 November
- Edition: 4th
- Category: Grand Prix
- Draw: 32S / 16D
- Prize money: $100,000
- Surface: Hard / outdoor
- Location: São Paulo, Brazil
- Venue: Parque do Ibirapuera

Champions

Singles
- (Argentina) Martín Jaite

Doubles
- Final not played
- ATP São Paulo

The 1989 Philips Open was a men's tennis tournament played on outdoor hard courts at the Parque do Ibirapuera in São Paulo, Brazil that was part of the 1989 Nabisco Grand Prix. It was the fourth edition of the tournament and took place from 6 November through 12 November 1989. Second-seeded Martín Jaite won the singles title and earned $20,000 first prize money.

== Finals ==
=== Singles ===
(Argentina) Martín Jaite defeated (Spain) Javier Sánchez 7–6^{(7–5)}, 6–3

- It was Jaite's 3rd singles title of the year and the 8th of his career.

=== Doubles ===
The doubles event was cancelled at the quarterfinal stage due to rain.
