= 1985 Grand Prix de Tennis de Toulouse – Singles =

Singles
- 1985 Grand Prix de Tennis de Toulouse

Final
- Champion: (France) Yannick Noah
- Runner-up: (Czechoslovakia) Tomáš Šmíd
- Score: 6–4, 6–4

Details
- Draw: 32
- Seeds: 8

Events
| Singles | Doubles |
- Grand Prix de Tennis de Toulouse

The 1985 Grand Prix de Tennis de Toulouse was a men's tennis tournament played on indoor carpet courts in Toulouse, France that was part of the Regular Series of the 1985 Grand Prix tennis circuit. It was the fourth edition of the tournament and was held from 7 October – 13 October.

== Seeds ==
Champion seeds are indicated in bold text while text in italics indicates the round in which those seeds were eliminated.

1. (France) **Yannick Noah (champion)**
2. (Czechoslovakia) Tomáš Šmíd (final)
3. (France) Thierry Tulasne (second round)
4. (Sweden) Jan Gunnarsson (quarterfinals)
5. (India) Ramesh Krishnan (semifinals)
6. (Switzerland) Jakob Hlasek (quarterfinals)
7. (Czechoslovakia) Marián Vajda (second round)
8. (France) Guy Forget (semifinals)

== Draw ==
Key

- Q = Qualifier
- WC = Wild card
- LL = Lucky loser
- Alt = Alternate
- ITF = ITF entry
- PR = Protected ranking
- SR = Special ranking
- SE = Special exempt
- JE = Junior exempt
- JR = Junior Accelerator Programme entrant
- CO = College Accelerator Programme entrant
- NG = Next Gen Accelerator Program entrant
- w/o = Walkover
- r = Retired
- d = Defaulted

=== Finals ===
Semifinals
1 | **(France) Yannick Noah** | **6** | **6**
8 | (France) Guy Forget | 4 | 2
5 | (India) Ramesh Krishnan | **7** | 3 | 4
2 | **(Czechoslovakia) Tomáš Šmíd** | 6 | **6** | **6**

Final
1 | **(France) Yannick Noah** | **6** | **6**
2 | (Czechoslovakia) Tomáš Šmíd | 4 | 4

=== Top half ===
First round
1 | **(France) Yannick Noah** | **7** | **6**
(Chile) Ricardo Acuña | 6 | 1
**(United States) Mark Dickson** | **6** | **6**
(Canada) Stephane Bonneau | 3 | 3
**(Romania) Ilie Năstase** | **6** | 1 | **6**
(Italy) Alessandro de Minicis | 3 | **6** | 3
6 | **(Switzerland) Jakob Hlasek** | **6** | **6**
(Sweden) Magnus Tideman | 3 | 4
3 | **(France) Thierry Tulasne** | **6** | **6**
(West Germany) Michael Westphal | 0 | 2
**(Czechoslovakia) Libor Pimek** | **6** | **7**
(Czechoslovakia) Pavel Složil | 0 | 6
**(Uruguay) Diego Pérez** | **6** | **6**
(Haiti) Ronald Agénor | 2 | 4
8 | **(France) Guy Forget** | **6** | 5 | **7**
(Netherlands) Michiel Schapers | 3 | **7** | 5

Second round
1 | **(France) Y Noah** | **7** | **6**
(United States) M Dickson | 6 | 1
(Romania) I Năstase | 4 | 3
6 | **(Switzerland) J Hlasek** | **6** | **6**
3 | (France) T Tulasne | 3 | **6** | 1
**(Czechoslovakia) L Pimek** | **6** | 3 | **6**
(Uruguay) D Pérez | 6 | 1
8 | **(France) G Forget** | **7** | **6**

Quarterfinals
1 | **(France) Y Noah** | **6** | **7**
6 | (Switzerland) J Hlasek | 3 | 5
(Czechoslovakia) L Pimek | 2 | **7** | 7
8 | **(France) G Forget** | **6** | 6 | **9**

Semifinals
1 | **(France) Y Noah** | **6** | **6**
8 | (France) G Forget | 4 | 2

=== Bottom half ===
First round
5 | **(India) Ramesh Krishnan** | **6** | **6**
(Socialist Federal Republic of Yugoslavia) Marko Ostoja | 3 | 0
**(Australia) Russell Barlow** | **6** | 1 | **8**
(Poland) Wojciech Fibak | 2 | **6** | 6
**(Czechoslovakia) Jaroslav Navrátil** | **6** | **6**
(Czechoslovakia) Stanislav Birner | 3 | 3
4 | **(Sweden) Jan Gunnarsson** | 4 | **6** | **6**
(Australia) Carl Limberger | **6** | 3 | 3
7 | **(Czechoslovakia) Marián Vajda** | 4 | **6** | **6**
(Sweden) Stefan Simonsson | **6** | 3 | 3
**(France) Jérôme Potier** | **6** | 3 | **6**
(Sweden) Jonas Svensson | 3 | **6** | 4
**(Sweden) Stefan Eriksson** | **6** | **6**
(Sweden) Peter Lundgren | 4 | 4
2 | **(Czechoslovakia) Tomáš Šmíd** | **6** | **6**
(France) Tarik Benhabiles | 4 | 0

Second round
5 | **(India) R Krishnan** | **6** | **6**
(Australia) R Barlow | 3 | 2
(Czechoslovakia) J Navrátil | 4 | 3
4 | **(Sweden) J Gunnarsson** | **6** | **6**
7 | (Czechoslovakia) M Vajda | 3 | 2
**(France) J Potier** | **6** | **6**
(Sweden) S Eriksson | **6** | 3 | 0
2 | **(Czechoslovakia) T Šmíd** | 3 | **6** | **6**

Quarterfinals
5 | **(India) R Krishnan** | **6** | **6**
4 | (Sweden) J Gunnarsson | 4 | 3
(France) J Potier | 5 | 4
2 | **(Czechoslovakia) T Šmíd** | **7** | **6**

Semifinals
5 | (India) R Krishnan | **7** | 3 | 4
2 | **(Czechoslovakia) T Šmíd** | 6 | **6** | **6**
