= 1994 Topper South American Open =

- Date: 7–14 November
- Edition: 23rd
- Category: World Series
- Draw: 32S / 16D
- Prize money: $288,750
- Surface: Clay / outdoor
- Location: Buenos Aires, Argentina

Champions

Singles
- (Spain) Àlex Corretja

Doubles
- (Spain) Sergio Casal / (Spain) Emilio Sánchez
← 1993 ·	ATP Buenos Aires	· 1995 →

The 1994 Topper South American Open was an Association of Tennis Professionals men's tennis tournament held in Buenos Aires, Argentina and played on outdoor clay courts. It was the 23rd edition of the tournament and was held from 7 November through 14 November 1994. Third-seeded Àlex Corretja won the singles title.

== Finals ==
=== Singles ===
(Spain) Àlex Corretja defeated (Argentina) Javier Frana 6–3, 5–7, 7–6^{(7–5)}

- It was Corretja's only title of the year and the 1st of his career.

=== Doubles ===
(Spain) Sergio Casal / (Spain) Emilio Sánchez defeated (Spain) Tomás Carbonell / (Spain) Francisco Roig 6–3, 6–2

- It was Casal's 2nd title of the year and the 46th of his career. It was Sánchez's 2nd title of the year and the 63rd of his career.
