= 1987 Ford Cup =

- Date: 9–15 November
- Edition: 2nd
- Category: Grand Prix
- Draw: 32S / 16D
- Prize money: $89,400
- Surface: Hard / outdoor
- Location: São Paulo, Brazil
- Venue: Hotel Transamerica

Champions

Singles
- (Peru) Jaime Yzaga

Doubles
- (Israel) Gilad Bloom / (Spain) Javier Sánchez
- ATP São Paulo

The 1987 Ford Cup was a men's tennis tournament played on outdoor hard courts at the Hotel Transamerica in São Paulo, Brazil that was part of the 1987 Nabisco Grand Prix. It was the second edition of the tournament and took place from 9 November through 15 November 1987. Unseeded Jaime Yzaga won the singles title and earned $17,880 first prize money.

== Finals ==
=== Singles ===
(Peru) Jaime Yzaga defeated (Brazil) Luiz Mattar 6–2, 4–6, 6–2

- It was Yzaga's 2nd singles title of the year and of his career.

=== Doubles ===
(Israel) Gilad Bloom / (Spain) Javier Sánchez defeated (Spain) Sergio Casal / (Spain) Tomás Carbonell 6–3, 6–7^{(5–7)}, 6–4

- It was Bloom's 2nd and last doubles title of the year and the 2nd of his career. It was Sánchez's 2nd and last doubles title of the year and the 2nd of his career.
