= 1985 Grand Prix de Tennis de Toulouse – Doubles =

Doubles
- 1985 Grand Prix de Tennis de Toulouse

Final
- Champions: (Chile) Ricardo Acuña (Switzerland) Jakob Hlasek
- Runners-up: (Czechoslovakia) Pavel Složil (Czechoslovakia) Tomáš Šmíd
- Score: 3–6, 6–2, 9–7

Events
Singles	Doubles
- Grand Prix de Tennis de Toulouse

The 1985 Grand Prix de Tennis de Toulouse was a men's tennis tournament played on indoor carpet in Toulouse, France that was part of the Regular Series of the 1985 Grand Prix tennis circuit. It was the fourth edition of the tournament and was held from 7 October to 13 October.

== Seeds ==
Champion seeds are indicated in bold text while text in italics indicates the round in which those seeds were eliminated.

1. (Czechoslovakia) Pavel Složil / (Czechoslovakia) Tomáš Šmíd (final)
2. (Poland) Wojciech Fibak / (Czechoslovakia) Libor Pimek (first round)
3. (Sweden) Jan Gunnarsson / (Denmark) Michael Mortensen (first round)
4. (Chile) **Ricardo Acuña** / (Switzerland) **Jakob Hlasek (champions)**

== Draw ==
Key

- Q = Qualifier
- WC = Wild card
- LL = Lucky loser
- Alt = Alternate
- ITF = ITF entry
- PR = Protected ranking
- SR = Special ranking
- SE = Special exempt
- JE = Junior exempt
- JR = Junior Accelerator Programme entrant
- CO = College Accelerator Programme entrant
- NG = Next Gen Accelerator Program entrant
- w/o = Walkover
- r = Retired
- d = Defaulted

=== Finals ===
First round
1	(Czechoslovakia) **Pavel Složil** **(Czechoslovakia) Tomáš Šmíd**	4	**6**	**6**
(Australia) Russell Barlow (Australia) Carl Limberger	**6**	1	0
(Haiti) **Ronald Agénor** **(France) Tarik Benhabiles**	**7**	**6**
(Spain) Juan Antonio Rodríguez (Spain) Ricardo Sanchez-Rueda	5	4
(Sweden) **Stefan Eriksson** **(Sweden) Peter Lundgren**	**6**	**6**
3	(Sweden) Jan Gunnarsson (Denmark) Michael Mortensen	4	3
(Socialist Federal Republic of Yugoslavia) **Marko Ostoja** **(Sweden) Hans Simonsson**	**7**	**6**
(United States) Mark Dickson (Netherlands) Michiel Schapers	5	4
(Czechoslovakia) **Jaroslav Navrátil** **(Sweden) Stefan Svensson**	6	**6**	**6**
(France) Guy Forget (France) Thierry Tulasne	**7**	3	4
4	(Chile) **Ricardo Acuña** **(Switzerland) Jakob Hlasek**	**7**	**7**
(Czechoslovakia) Stanislav Birner (Nigeria) Tony Mmoh	6	6
(Sweden) **Ronnie Båthman** **(Sweden) Magnus Tideman**	4	**6**
(Italy) Alessandro de Minicis (Uruguay) Diego Pérez	**6**	2
(Austria) **Alex Antonitsch** **(Switzerland) Dominik Utzinger**	5	**6**	**6**
2	(Poland) Wojciech Fibak (Czechoslovakia) Libor Pimek	**7**	3	3

Quarterfinals
1	(Czechoslovakia) **P Složil** **(Czechoslovakia) T Šmíd**	**6**	**6**
(Haiti) R Agénor (France) T Benhabiles	1	1
(Sweden) **S Eriksson** **(Sweden) P Lundgren**	**6**	**6**
(Socialist Federal Republic of Yugoslavia) M Ostoja (Sweden) H Simonsson	1	3
(Czechoslovakia) J Navrátil (Sweden) S Svensson	2	4
4	(Chile) **R Acuña** **(Switzerland) J Hlasek**	**6**	**6**
(Sweden) **R Båthman** **(Sweden) M Tideman**	**7**	**7**
(Austria) A Antonitsch (Switzerland) D Utzinger	5	6

Semifinals
1	(Czechoslovakia) **P Složil** **(Czechoslovakia) T Šmíd**	4	**6**	**6**
(Sweden) S Eriksson (Sweden) P Lundgren	**6**	3	2
4	(Chile) **R Acuña** **(Switzerland) J Hlasek**	**6**	**6**
(Sweden) R Båthman (Sweden) M Tideman	1	4

Final
1	(Czechoslovakia) P Složil (Czechoslovakia) T Šmíd	**6**	2	7
4	(Chile) **R Acuña** **(Switzerland) J Hlasek**	3	**6**	**9**
