= 2000 ATP Buenos Aires =

- Date: November 20 – November 27
- Edition: 28th

Champions

Singles
- (Argentina) Guillermo Coria

Doubles
- (Argentina) Pablo Albano / (Argentina) Lucas Arnold Ker
- ATP Buenos Aires

The 2000 ATP Buenos Aires was an ATP Challenger Series tennis tournament held in Buenos Aires, Argentina. The tournament was held from November 20 to November 27.

== Finals ==
=== Singles ===
(Argentina) Guillermo Coria defeated (Spain) Alberto Berasategui 6–1, 4–6, 6–4

=== Doubles ===
(Argentina) Pablo Albano / (Argentina) Lucas Arnold Ker defeated (Argentina) Sergio Roitman / (Argentina) Andrés Schneiter 6–3, 4–6, 6–2
