= 1994 Topper South American Open – Doubles =

Doubles
- 1994 ATP Buenos Aires

Final
- Champions: (Spain) Sergio Casal (Spain) Emilio Sánchez
- Runners-up: (Spain) Tomás Carbonell (Spain) Francisco Roig
- Score: 6–3, 6–2

Details
- Draw: 16
- Seeds: 4

Events
Singles	Doubles
- ATP Buenos Aires

Tomás Carbonell and Carlos Costa were the defending champions, but did not participate together this year. Carbonell partnered Francisco Roig, losing in the final. Costa partnered Christian Miniussi, losing in the first round.

Sergio Casal and Emilio Sánchez won the title, defeating Carbonell and Roig 6–3, 6–2 in the final.

== Seeds ==
1. (Spain) Sergio Casal / (Spain) Emilio Sánchez (champions)
2. (Spain) Tomás Carbonell / (Spain) Francisco Roig (final)
3. (Italy) Cristian Brandi / (Italy) Federico Mordegan (first round)
4. (Czech Republic) Karel Nováček / (Uruguay) Diego Pérez (first round)

== Draw ==
Key

- Q = Qualifier
- WC = Wild card
- LL = Lucky loser
- Alt = Alternate
- ITF = ITF entry
- PR = Protected ranking
- SR = Special ranking
- SE = Special exempt
- JE = Junior exempt
- JR = Junior Accelerator Programme entrant
- CO = College Accelerator Programme entrant
- NG = Next Gen Accelerator Program entrant
- w/o = Walkover
- r = Retired
- d = Defaulted

=== Draw ===
First round
1	(Spain) S Casal (Spain) E Sánchez	6	6
(Netherlands) T Kempers (United States) J Waite	1	4
WC	(Argentina) F Davín (Argentina) G Markus	1	3
(Argentina) J Garat (Argentina) L Lobo	6	6
4	(Czech Republic) K Nováček (Uruguay) D Pérez	0	3
(Spain) J Arrese (United States) G Van Emburgh	6	6
(Spain) JA Conde (United States) D Johnson	4	3
WC	(Argentina) J Frana (Mexico) L Lavalle	6	6
WC	(Spain) C Costa (Argentina) C Miniussi	4	5
(Argentina) P Albano (Venezuela) N Pereira	6	7
(Argentina) P Arnold (Argentina) D Orsanic	6	6
3	(Italy) C Brandi (Italy) F Mordegan	3	3
Q	(Czech Republic) S Doseděl (United States) V Spadea	4	7	6
(Mexico) J Lozano (Venezuela) M Ruah	6	6	4
(Brazil) O Della (Brazil) M Saliola	3	0
2	(Spain) T Carbonell (Spain) F Roig	6	6

Quarterfinals
1	(Spain) S Casal (Spain) E Sánchez	6	7
(Argentina) J Garat (Argentina) L Lobo	3	6
(Spain) J Arrese (United States) G Van Emburgh	4	4
WC	(Argentina) J Frana (Mexico) L Lavalle	6	6
(Argentina) P Albano (Venezuela) N Pereira	6	4
(Argentina) P Arnold (Argentina) D Orsanic	7	6
Q	(Czech Republic) S Doseděl (United States) V Spadea	4	2
2	(Spain) T Carbonell (Spain) F Roig	6	6

Semifinals
1	(Spain) S Casal (Spain) E Sánchez	6	6
WC	(Argentina) J Frana (Mexico) L Lavalle	3	2
(Argentina) P Arnold (Argentina) D Orsanic	1	4
2	(Spain) T Carbonell (Spain) F Roig	6	6

Final
1	(Spain) S Casal (Spain) E Sánchez	6	6
2	(Spain) T Carbonell (Spain) F Roig	3	2
