= 1986 Grand Prix de Tennis de Toulouse =

- Date: 6–12 October
- Edition: 5th
- Category: Regular Series
- Draw: 32S / 16D
- Prize money: $150,000
- Surface: Carpet / indoor
- Location: Toulouse, France

Champions

Singles
- (France) Guy Forget

Doubles
- (Czechoslovakia) Miloslav Mečíř / (Czechoslovakia) Tomáš Šmíd
- Grand Prix de Tennis de Toulouse

The 1986 Grand Prix de Tennis de Toulouse was a men's tennis tournament played on indoor Carpet courts in Toulouse, France that was part of the Regular Series of the 1986 Grand Prix tennis circuit. It was the fifth edition of the tournament and was held from 6 October until 12 October 1986. Seventh-seeded Guy Forget won the singles title.

== Finals ==
=== Singles ===
(France) Guy Forget defeated (Sweden) Jan Gunnarsson, 4–6, 6–3, 6–2

=== Doubles ===
(Czechoslovakia) Miloslav Mečíř / (Czechoslovakia) Tomáš Šmíd defeated (Switzerland) Jakob Hlasek / (Czechoslovakia) Pavel Složil, 6–2, 3–6, 6–4.
