= 1997 ATP Buenos Aires =

- Date: 24 November – 1 December
- Edition: 25th
- Surface: Clay / outdoor
- Location: Buenos Aires, Argentina

Champions

Singles
- (Argentina) Franco Squillari

Doubles
- (Argentina) Diego del Río / (Argentina) Daniel Orsanic
- ATP Buenos Aires

The 1997 ATP Buenos Aires was an ATP Challenger Series men's tennis tournament that took place in Buenos Aires, Argentina. The tournament was held from 24 November until 1 December 1994. Franco Squillari who notably beat Roger Federer twice in his career won the singles title.

== Finals ==
=== Singles ===
(Argentina) Franco Squillari defeated (Argentina) Diego Moyano 6–1, 6–4

=== Doubles ===
(Argentina) Diego del Río / (Argentina) Daniel Orsanic defeated (Argentina) Pablo Albano / (Argentina) Luis Lobo 6–4, 4–6, 6–1
