= 1988 Copa Nabisco Royal Open =

1988 Buenos Aires Grand Prix
- Date: 7–14 November
- Edition: 20th
- Category: Grand Prix
- Draw: 32S / 16D
- Prize money: $93,400
- Surface: Clay / outdoor
- Location: Buenos Aires, Argentina

Champions

Singles
- (Spain) Javier Sánchez

Doubles
- (Spain) Carlos Costa / (Spain) Javier Sánchez
← 1987 ·	Buenos Aires Grand Prix	· 1992 →

The 1988 Copa Nabisco Royal, also known as the Buenos Aires Grand Prix, was a men's Grand Prix tennis men's tournament held in on outdoor clay courts in Buenos Aires, Argentina. It was the 20th edition of the tournament and was held from 7 November through 14 November 1988. Seventh-seeded Javier Sánchez won the singles title.

== Finals ==
=== Singles ===
(Spain) Javier Sánchez defeated (Argentina) Guillermo Pérez Roldán 6–2, 7–6

- It was Sánchez's 3rd title of the year and the 5th of his career.

=== Doubles ===
(Spain) Carlos Costa / (Spain) Javier Sánchez defeated (Argentina) Eduardo Bengoechea / (Argentina) José Luis Clerc 6–3, 3–6, 6–3

- It was Costa's only title of the year and the 1st of his career. It was Sánchez's 2nd title of the year and the 4th of his career.
