= Martin Stringari =

Argentine tennis player

- Country (sports): Argentina
- Born: 9 October 1971 (age 54) Buenos Aires, Argentina
- Height: 1.88 m (6 ft 2 in)
- Turned pro: 1990
- Plays: Right-handed
- Prize money: $175,652

Singles
- Career record: 6–12
- Career titles: 0
- Highest ranking: No. 125 (5 April 1993)

Doubles
- Career record: 0–1
- Career titles: 0
- Highest ranking: No. 228 (12 May 1997)

Martin Stringari (born 9 October 1971) is a former professional tennis player from Argentina.

== Career ==
Stringari and partner Patricio Arnold were Orange Bowl winners in 1987, for the "16 and under" age category. He also made the semi-finals of the singles and en route eliminated top seed Nicklas Kulti. At the junior Grand Slam events he made the doubles quarter-finals at the French Open in 1988 and 1989, as well as being a doubles quarter-finalist at the 1988 US Open.

He won six matches during his professional career on the ATP Tour. His biggest win came at Búzios in 1992, when he beat world number 32 Jordi Arrese, with the Spaniard retiring late in the first set, trailing 2–5.

== Challenger titles ==
=== Singles: (1) ===
| No. | Year | Tournament | Surface | Opponent | Score |
|---|---|---|---|---|---|
| 1. | 1992 | São Paulo, Brazil | Clay | (Venezuela) Nicolás Pereira | 6–3, 3–6, 6–2 |

=== Doubles: (1) ===
| No. | Year | Tournament | Surface | Partner | Opponents | Score |
|---|---|---|---|---|---|---|
| 1. | 1994 | Campinas, Brazil | Clay | (Argentina) Patricio Arnold | (Ecuador) Andrés Alarcón (Colombia) Mario Rincón | 6–1, 6–3 |
