= 1993 Topper South American Open =

- Date: 8–15 November
- Edition: 22nd
- Category: World Series
- Draw: 32S / 16D
- Prize money: $275,000
- Surface: Clay / outdoor
- Location: Buenos Aires, Argentina
- Venue: Buenos Aires Lawn Tennis Club

Champions

Singles
- (Spain) Carlos Costa

Doubles
- (Spain) Tomás Carbonell / (Spain) Carlos Costa
← 1992 ·	ATP Buenos Aires	· 1994 →

The 1993 Topper South American Open Tennis Championships was an Association of Tennis Professionals men's tennis tournament played on outdoor clay courts at the Buenos Aires Lawn Tennis Club in Buenos Aires, Argentina. It was the 22nd edition of the tournament and was held from 8 November though 15 November 1993. Second-seeded Carlos Costa won the singles title.

== Finals ==
=== Singles ===
(Spain) Carlos Costa defeated (Spain) Alberto Berasategui 3–6, 6–1, 6–4

- It was Costa's 3rd title of the year and the 9th of his career.

=== Doubles ===
(Spain) Tomás Carbonell / (Spain) Carlos Costa defeated (Spain) Sergio Casal / (Spain) Emilio Sánchez 6–4, 6–4

- It was Carbonell's 3rd title of the year and the 12th of his career. It was Costa's 2nd title of the year and the 8th of his career.
