= Sérgio Ribeiro (tennis) =

Brazilian tennis player

- Country (sports): Brazil
- Prize money: $11,528

Singles
- Career record: 1–1
- Highest ranking: No. 338 (8 Sep 1986)

Grand Slam singles results
- Wimbledon: Q1 (1986)

Doubles
- Career record: 1–4
- Highest ranking: No. 265 (23 Nov 1987)

Sérgio Ribeiro is a Brazilian former professional tennis player.

Ribeiro, a native of Paraná, is the son of Brazilian Davis Cup player Ivo.

Ranked as high as 338 in the world, Ribeiro had a win over Roberto Argüello to make the second round at St Vincent in 1987, then took a set off the top-seeded Kent Carlsson in a second round loss.
