= Patricio Arnold =

Argentine tennis player

- Country (sports): Argentina
- Born: 20 October 1971 (age 54) Buenos Aires, Argentina
- Height: 6 ft (183 cm)
- Plays: Right-handed
- Prize money: $112,935

Singles
- Career record: 1-9
- Career titles: 0
- Highest ranking: No. 134 (16 May 1994)

Grand Slam singles results
- French Open: 1R (1994)

Doubles
- Career record: 8-10
- Career titles: 0
- Highest ranking: No. 93 (24 Oct 1994)

Grand Slam doubles results
- French Open: 1R (1995)
- Wimbledon: 1R (1995)

Patricio Arnold (born 20 October 1971) is a former professional tennis player from Argentina. He is the older brother of Lucas Arnold Ker.

== Career ==
Arnold was ranked as high as ninth during his junior career, which included winning the South American Championships in the 14s and 16s categories, in 1985 and 1987, as well as the Banana Bowl in 1989.

The Argentine went to college in the United States, firstly at the University of Georgia, where he played collegiate tennis in 1990 and 1991, reaching the final of the NCAA Men's Tennis Championship final in the last of those years. He then transferred to the University of South Florida.

In 1991, on his ATP Tour debut, Arnold upset world number 51 Amos Mansdorf at Long Island's Norstar Bank Hamlet Challenge Cup.

With partner Daniel Orsanic, Arnold made the doubles semi-finals of the 1993 South American Open in Buenos Aires.

He made his first Grand Slam appearance at the 1994 French Open and lost his opening match in five sets, to Jonas Björkman, 7–9 in the fifth. Also that year, Arnold made two further doubles semi-finals, in San Marino with Luis Lobo and again with Orsanic at Buenos Aires.

Arnold was selected to play the fifth and deciding rubber of a Davis Cup tie for Argentina in April 1995, against Venezuelan Maurice Ruah. He lost in four sets.

In the 1995 French Open he teamed up with Orsanic but the pair were unable to progress past Byron Black and Jonathan Stark in the first round. He changed his partner for the 1995 Wimbledon Championships, choosing to play with Jorge Lozano, but they would be defeated in the opening round by Trevor Kronemann and David Macpherson.

== Challenger titles ==
=== Doubles: (6) ===
No.	Year	Tournament	Surface	Partner	Opponents	Score
1.	1994	Mar del Plata, Argentina	Clay	(Argentina) Lucas Arnold Ker	(Italy) Filippo Messori (Italy) Federico Mordegan	6–4, 7–5
2.	1994	Campinas, Brazil	Clay	(Argentina) Martin Stringari	(Ecuador) Andrés Alarcón (Colombia) Mario Rincón	6–1, 6–3
3.	1994	Campos do Jordão, Brazil	Hard	(United States) Richard Matuszewski	(Brazil) Fabio Silberberg (Brazil) Marcelo Saliola	6–3, 6–4
4.	1994	Recife, Brazil	Hard	(Argentina) Pablo Albano	(Chile) Felipe Rivera (Brazil) Cristiano Testa	7–6, 7–6
5.	1994	Ribeirão Preto, Brazil	Clay	(Argentina) Pablo Albano	(Brazil) Otavio Della (Brazil) Marcelo Saliola	6–7, 6–2, 6–2
6.	1995	São Paulo, Brazil	Hard	(Argentina) Lucas Arnold Ker	(Brazil) Otavio Della (Brazil) Marcelo Saliola	6–2, 4–6, 6–1
