= ATP São Paulo =

ATP Sao Paulo

Defunct tennis tournament
- Tour: ATP Tour
- Founded: 1987
- Abolished: 1993
- Editions: 7
- Location: São Paulo, Brazil
- Venue: Hotel Transamerica (1987–92); Esporte Clube Pinheiros (1993)
- Surface: Hard / outdoor (1987–92); Clay / outdoor (1993)

The ATP São Paulo, also referred to by its sponsored names Ford Cup, Banespa Open and Sul America Open, is a defunct men's tennis tournament that was played on the Grand Prix tennis circuit from 1987 through 1989 and on the ATP Tour from 1991 through 1993. The event was held in São Paulo, Brazil and was played on outdoor hard courts from 1987 through 1992 at Hotel Transamerica, and on outdoor clay courts in 1993 at Esporte Clube Pinheiros. The tournament was a replacement for the ATP Itaparica which finished in 1990.

== Finals ==
=== Singles ===
Year	Champions	Runners-up	Score
1987	(Peru) Jaime Yzaga	(Brazil) Luiz Mattar	6–2, 4–6, 6–2
1988	(United States) Jay Berger	(Argentina) Horacio de la Peña	6–4, 6–4
1989	(Argentina) Martín Jaite	(Spain) Javier Sánchez	7–6^{(7–5)}, 6–3
1990	(United States) Robbie Weiss	(Peru) Jaime Yzaga	3–6, 7–6^{(9–7)}, 6–3
1991	(Argentina) Christian Miniussi	(Brazil) Jaime Oncins	2–6, 6–3, 6–4
1992	(Brazil) Luiz Mattar	(Brazil) Jaime Oncins	6–1, 6–4
1993	(Spain) Alberto Berasategui	(Czech Republic) Slava Doseděl	6–4, 6–3

=== Doubles ===
Year	Champions	Runners-up	Score
1987	(Israel) Gilad Bloom (Spain) Javier Sánchez	(Spain) Sergio Casal (Spain) Tomás Carbonell	6–3, 6–7^{(5–7)}, 6–4
1988	(United States) Jay Berger (Argentina) Horacio de la Peña	(Chile) Ricardo Acuña (Spain) Javier Sánchez	5–7, 6–4, 6–3
1989	Final not played due to rain		
1990	(United States) Shelby Cannon (Venezuela) Alfonso Mora	(Netherlands) Mark Koevermans (Brazil) Luiz Mattar	6–7, 6–3, 7–6
1991	(Ecuador) Andrés Gómez (Brazil) Jaime Oncins	(Mexico) Jorge Lozano (Brazil) Cássio Motta	7–5, 6–4
1992	(Uruguay) Diego Pérez (Spain) Francisco Roig	(Sweden) Christer Allgårdh (Australia) Carl Limberger	6–2, 7–6
1993	(Spain) Sergio Casal (Spain) Emilio Sánchez	(Argentina) Pablo Albano (Argentina) Javier Frana	4–6, 7–6, 6–4

== See also ==
- São Paulo WCT - men's tournament (1974–1976)
- Brasil Open - men's tournament (2001–2019)
