= Gustavo Garetto =

Argentine tennis player

- Full name: Gustavo Garetto
- Country (sports): Argentina
- Born: 23 July 1965 (age 60); Rafaela, Argentina
- Height: 191 cm (6 ft 3 in)
- Plays: Right-handed
- Prize money: $42,421

Singles
- Career record: 3–6
- Career titles: 0
- Highest ranking: No. 186 (30 November 1987)

Doubles
- Career record: 1–10
- Highest ranking: No. 170 (24 February 1992)

Gustavo Garetto (born 23 July 1965) is a former professional tennis player from Argentina.

== Biography ==
Garetto, who is of Italian descent, was born in the Argentine city of Rafaela. Based in Buenos Aires, he turned professional in 1983. His best performance on tour was a quarter-final appearance at the 1987 Argentine Open in Buenos Aires, where he had a win over top 50 player Ronald Agénor en route. He won a Challenger title in doubles at Santiago in 1991, partnering Marcelo Ingaramo.

He has two children and now coaches tennis in France.

== Challenger titles ==
=== Doubles: (1) ===
Year	Tournament	Surface	Partner	Opponents	Score
1991	Santiago, Chile	Clay	(Argentina) Marcelo Ingaramo	(Chile) Hans Gildemeister (Chile) Felipe Rivera	6–2, 4–6, 6–4
