= Ricardo Acuña =

Chilean tennis player (1958–2026)

- Country (sports): Chile
- Born: 13 January 1958 Santiago, Chile
- Died: November 2026 (aged 68)
- Height: 1.75 m (5 ft 9 in)
- Turned pro: 1978
- Retired: 1989
- Plays: Right-handed
- Prize money: $291,650

Singles
- Career record: 69–111
- Career titles: 0
- Highest ranking: No. 47 (17 March 1986)

Grand Slam singles results
- French Open: 1R (1983, 1984, 1986)
- Wimbledon: QF (1985)
- US Open: 3R (1983)

Doubles
- Career record: 71–102
- Career titles: 3
- Highest ranking: No. 45 (28 October 1985)

Grand Slam doubles results
- French Open: 2R (1981, 1985, 1986)
- Wimbledon: 2R (1987)
- US Open: 3R (1985)

Ricardo Acuña (13 January 1958 – c.21 November 2026) was a Chilean tennis player, who won three doubles titles during his career. The right-hander reached his highest ATP singles ranking of world No. 47 in March 1986.

After his retirement from competition, Acuña served as both the assistant director and the Director of Tennis at the ATP Headquarters in Ponte Vedra Beach, Florida. He served on the USTA Player Development staff as a National Coach for Men's tennis until his death in 2026.

== Career finals ==
=== Singles (1 runner-up) ===
Result	W/L	Date	Tournament	Surface	Opponent	Score
Loss	0–1	Nov 1982	Bahia, Brazil	Carpet	(Chile) Jaime Fillol	6–7, 4–6

=== Doubles (3 titles, 2 runner-ups) ===
Result	W/L	Date	Tournament	Surface	Partner	Opponents	Score
Loss	0–1	Mar 1983	Nancy, France	Carpet	(Chile) Belus Prajoux	(Sweden) Jan Gunnarsson (Sweden) Anders Järryd	5–7, 3–6
Win	1–1	Oct 1985	Toulouse, France	Hard	(Switzerland) Jakob Hlasek	(Czechoslovakia) Pavel Složil (Czechoslovakia) Jan Kodeš	3–6, 6–2, 9–7
Win	2–1	Nov 1986	Houston, U.S.	Carpet	(United States) Brad Pearce	(United States) Chip Hooper (United States) Mike Leach	6–4, 7–5
Win	3–1	Jan 1988	Guarujá, Brazil	Clay	(United States) Luke Jensen	(Argentina) Javier Frana (Uruguay) Diego Pérez	6–1, 6–4
Loss	3–2	Oct 1988	São Paulo, Brazil	Hard	(Spain) Javier Sánchez	(United States) Jay Berger (Argentina) Horacio de la Peña	7–5, 4–6, 3–6
