= Jay Berger =

American tennis player

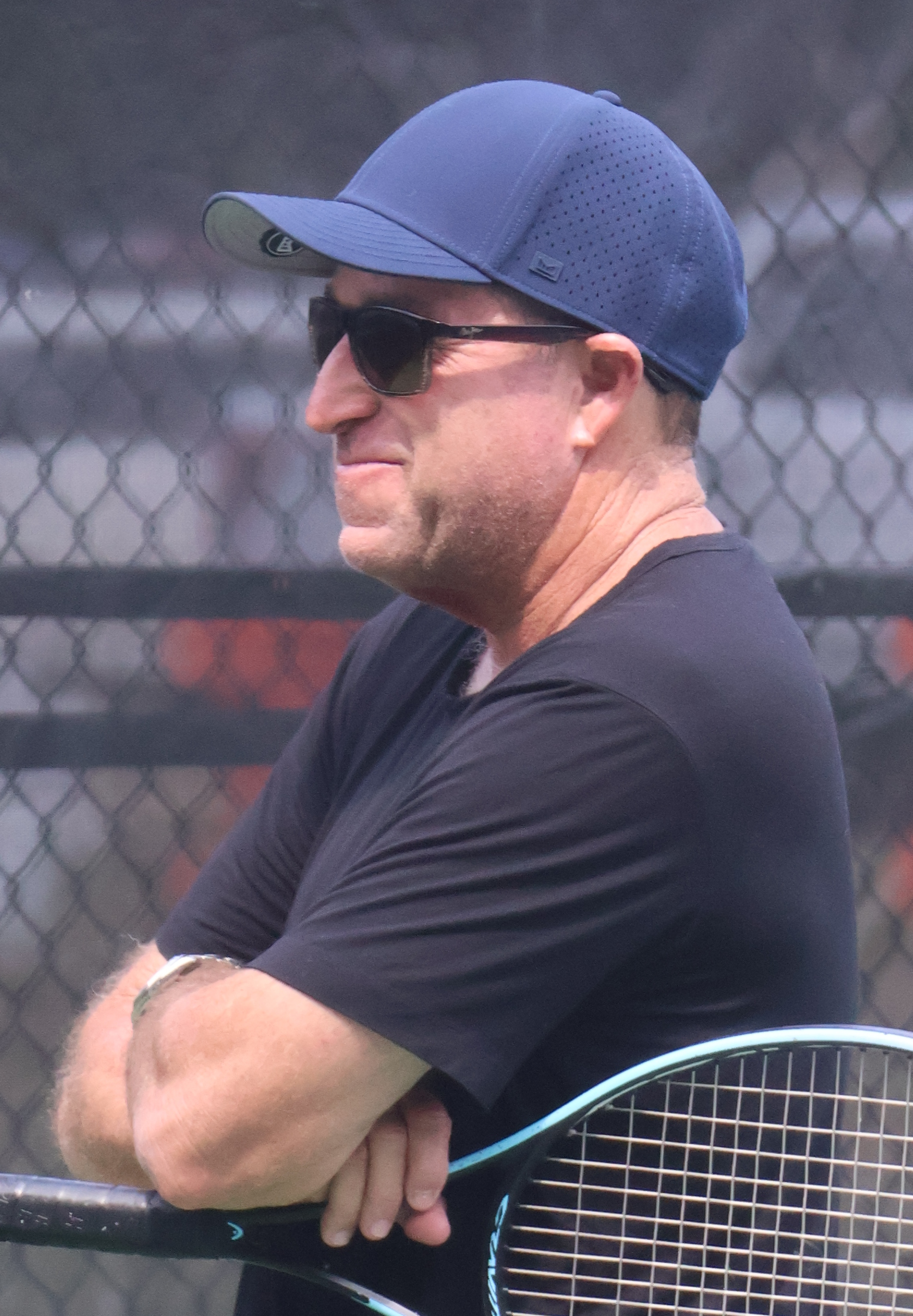
- Berger in 2024
- Country (sports): United States
- Residence: Jupiter, Florida, U.S.
- Born: November 26, 1966 (age 59) Fort Dix, Burlington County, New Jersey, U.S.
- Height: 5 ft 11 in (1.80 m)
- Turned pro: 1986
- Retired: 1991
- Plays: Right-handed (two handed backhand)
- Prize money: $992,136

Singles
- Career record: 141–80
- Career titles: 3
- Highest ranking: No. 7 (April 16, 1990)

Grand Slam singles results
- Australian Open: 3R (1991)
- French Open: QF (1989)
- Wimbledon: 2R (1988)
- US Open: QF (1989)

Doubles
- Career record: 19–28
- Career titles: 1
- Highest ranking: No. 196 (November 14, 1988)

Grand Slam doubles results
- US Open: 2R (1987)

Jay Berger (born November 26, 1966) is an American tennis coach and a former professional player. He won three singles and one doubles titles on the ATP Tour and reached his career-high singles ranking of World No. 7 in April 1990.

== Early and personal life ==
Berger was born in Fort Dix, New Jersey, and is Jewish. He and his wife Nadia resided on Key Biscayne and now reside in Jupiter, Florida, and have four children: daughter Alexandra, and sons Daniel, Jonathan, and Noah. His son Daniel, who played golf at Florida State (where he was an All-American), is a PGA Tour pro golfer who was 2015 Rookie of the Year, and as of February 14, 2021, has four career PGA Tour wins.

Since 2021 Berger is the Director of Athletics at the Club at Ibis.

== Tennis career ==
Berger was the USTA Boys’ 18s National Champion in 1985. He also won the 1985 Florida State Junior Championship.

He reached the fourth round in the 1985 US Open.

=== College career ===
Berger was an All-American at Clemson University in 1985 and 1986, where he recorded a 91–22 singles record in two seasons. His 80.5% career winning percentage in singles play places 3rd all-time at Clemson.

=== Pro tennis career ===
Berger turned professional in 1986. He played on the tour from 1986 to 1991.

He won his first top-level singles title in 1986 at Buenos Aires. In 1988, he captured both the singles and doubles titles at São Paulo. In March he upset world # 2 Mats Wilander, 6–0, 7–5, in Orlando, Florida. In March 1989 Berger upset world # 3 Boris Becker, 6–1, 6–1, in Indian Wells. In May he upset world # 3 Mats Wilander, 6–3, 6–4, in Rome. In August Berger beat world # 3 Stefan Edberg, 6–4, 6–2, at Indianapolis.

In 1989, Berger reached the quarterfinals at both the French Open and the US Open. He also won the third tour singles title of his career that year at Charleston, South Carolina. Berger was runner-up at the Canadian Open in 1990.

He retired from the professional tour in 1991. Chronic knee injuries forced his retirement.

During his career, he registered victories over Michael Chang, Stefan Edberg, Boris Becker, Jimmy Connors, Pete Sampras, and Mats Wilander.

==== Davis Cup ====
Berger appeared in Davis Cup play in 1988 and 1990.

=== Halls of Fame and Awards ===
Berger was inducted into the Florida Hall of Fame in 1993. He was inducted into the Greater Miami-Dade Hall of Fame in 2001. He was also voted "Sportsman of the Year" by the Olympic Committee in 1985, and "Junior Player of the Year" by TENNIS Magazine in 1985. In 2014 he was inducted into the National Jewish Sports Hall of Fame.

== Coaching career ==
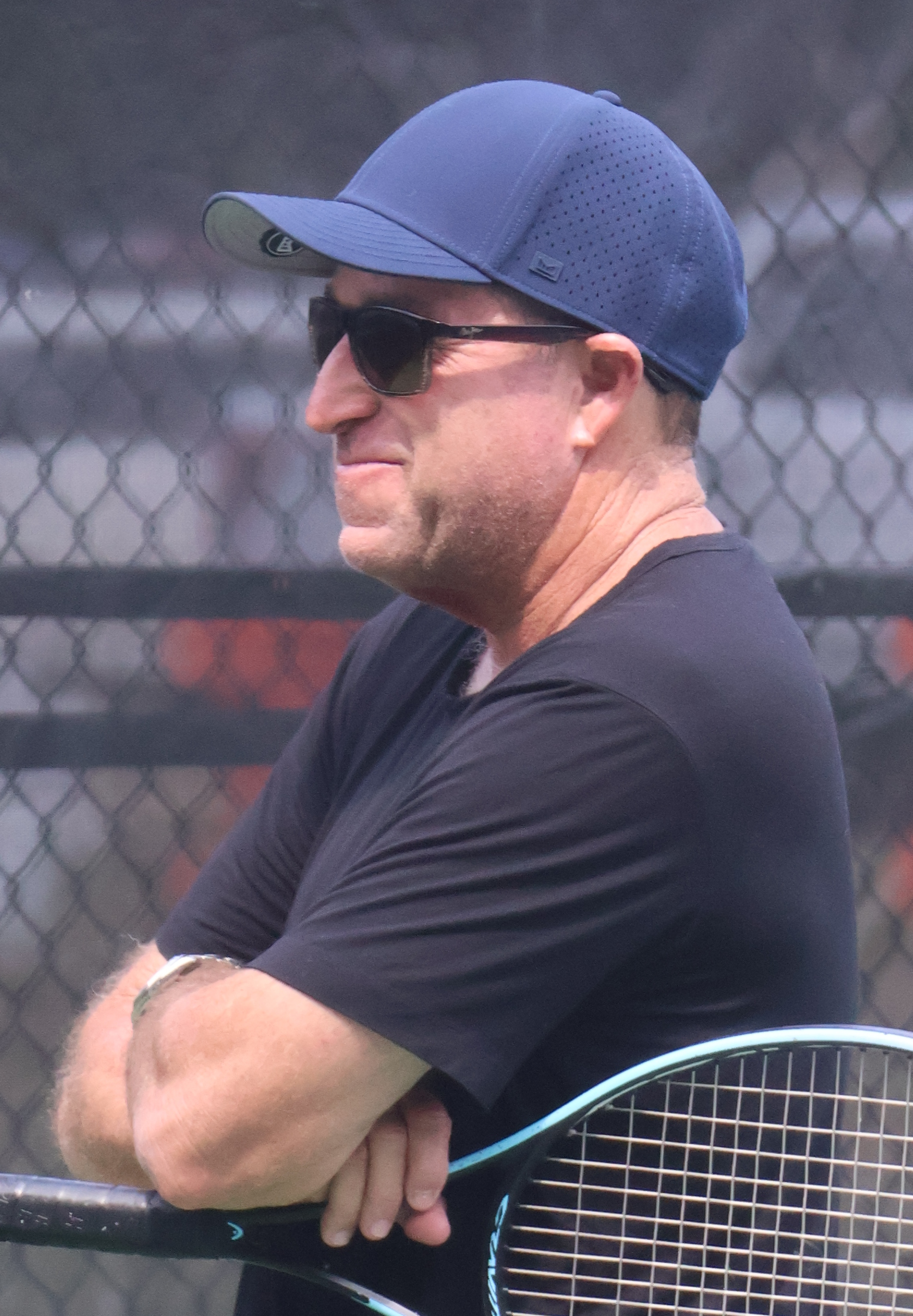

Singles
- Career record: 141–80

Doubles
- Career record: 19–28

Coaching career (1994–)
- Miami Hurricanes (2000–2001); Ashley Harkleroad

Coaching awards and records
- Awards Big East Coach of the Year 2000, '01

Berger went on to become an assistant coach at Florida International University, where he resumed his studies and graduated magna cum laude with a bachelor's degree in Sports Management in 1994. Berger was the Head Men’s and Women’s tennis coach at the University of Miami and coached the national team. He was the Big East Coach of the Year in 2000 and 2001.

He coached Ryan Harrison until Jan-Michael Gambill replaced him in 2014 after which he coached former world No. 8 Jack Sock.

He is also the longtime coach of former world No. 17 Reilly Opelka.

== Career finals ==
=== Singles (3 wins – 4 losses) ===
Result	W-L	Date	Tournament	Surface	Opponent	Score
Win	1–0	Nov 1986	Buenos Aires, Argentina	Clay	(Argentina) Franco Davín	6–3, 6–3
Loss	1–1	Nov 1987	Buenos Aires, Argentina	Clay	(Argentina) Guillermo Pérez Roldán	2–3 ret.
Win	2–1	Oct 1988	São Paulo, Brazil	Hard	(Argentina) Horacio de la Peña	6–4, 6–4
Win	3–1	May 1989	Charleston, US	Clay	(United States) Lawson Duncan	6–4, 6–3
Loss	3–2	Aug 1989	Indianapolis, US	Hard	(United States) John McEnroe	4–6, 6–4, 4–6
Loss	3–3	Nov 1989	Itaparica, Brazil	Hard	(Argentina) Martín Jaite	4–6, 4–6
Loss	3–4	Jul 1990	Toronto, Canada	Hard	(United States) Michael Chang	6–4, 3–6, 6–7^{(3–7)}

=== Doubles (1 win – 1 loss) ===
Result	W-L	Date	Tournament	Surface	Partner	Opponents	Score
Loss	0–1	Nov 1987	Buenos Aires, Argentina	Clay	(Argentina) Horacio de la Peña	(Spain) Tomás Carbonell (Spain) Sergio Casal	def.
Win	1–1	Oct 1988	São Paulo, Brazil	Hard	(Argentina) Horacio de la Peña	(Chile) Ricardo Acuña (Spain) Javier Sánchez	5–7, 6–4, 6–3

== See also ==
- List of select Jewish tennis players
