= Horacio de la Peña =

Argentine tennis player

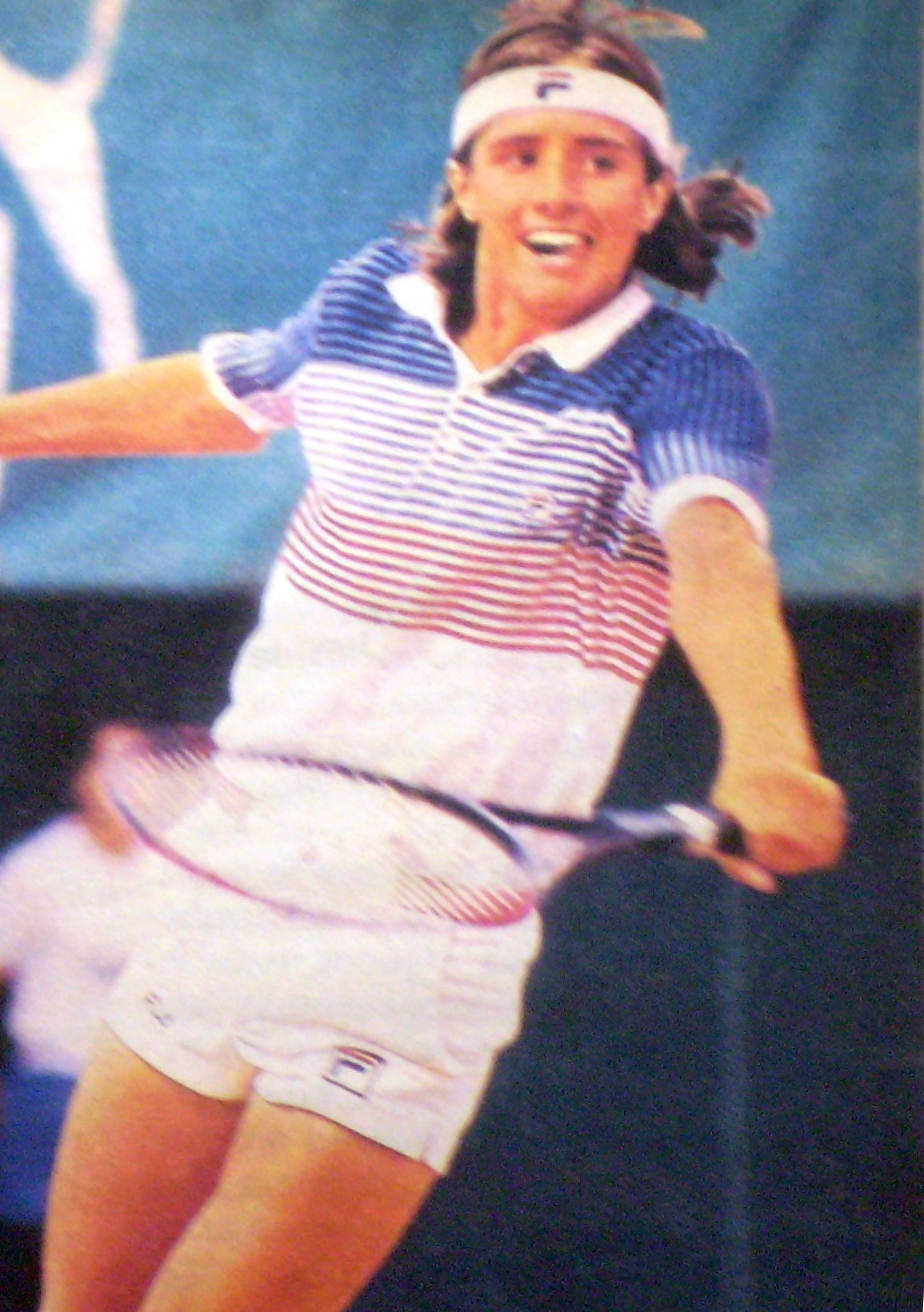
- Full name: Horacio Armando de la Peña
- Country (sports): Argentina
- Residence: Buenos Aires, Argentina; Santiago, Chile
- Born: 1 August 1966 (age 59) Buenos Aires, Argentina
- Height: 1.80 m (5 ft 11 in)
- Turned pro: 1984
- Retired: 1994
- Plays: Left-handed (one-handed backhand)
- Prize money: $1,234,768

Singles
- Career record: 190–180
- Career titles: 4
- Highest ranking: No. 31 (6 April 1987)

Grand Slam singles results
- Australian Open: 2R (1989)
- French Open: 4R (1986)
- Wimbledon: 1R (1988, 1989, 1992, 1993)
- US Open: 3R (1985)

Doubles
- Career record: 84–92
- Career titles: 6
- Highest ranking: No. 53 (22 April 1991)

Horacio de la Peña
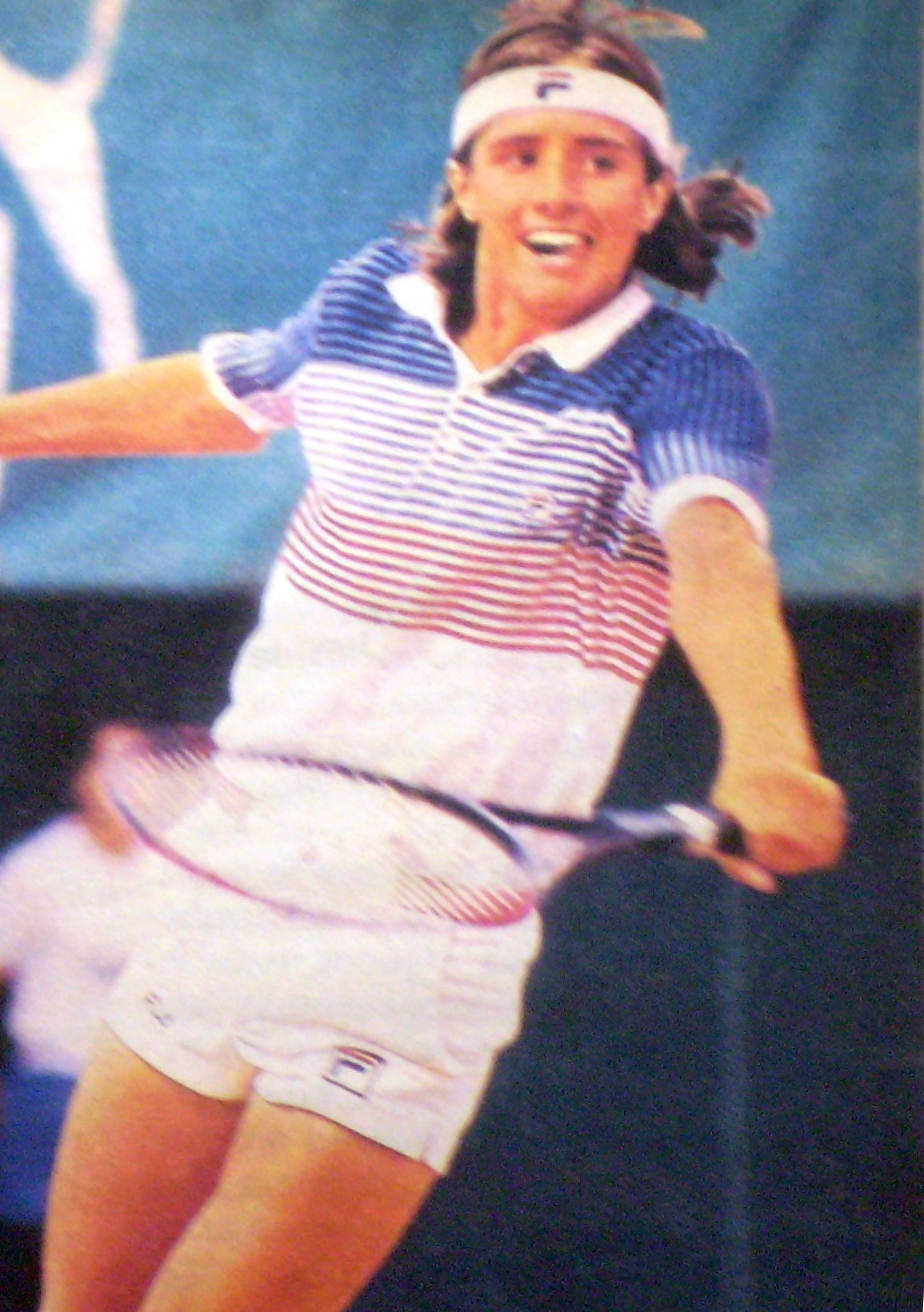
- Career record: 190–180
- Career record: 84–92

Coaching career (1994–)
- Franco Squillari (1994–2001); Martín Rodríguez; Guillermo Coria (2006); Paul Capdeville (2010–); Adrián García; Fernando González (2001–2006); Mariano Puerta; José Acasuso; Ker-Etlis; David Nalbandian; Gastón Gaudio

Coaching achievements
- Coachee singles titles total: 6(G)-3(Sq)-1(A)
- Coachee doubles titles total: 1(K)

Horacio Armando de la Peña (Latin American Spanish pronunciation: [oˈɾasjo ðe la ˈpeɲa]; born 1 August 1966), nicknamed "el Pulga" ("the Flea"), is a tennis coach and a former professional player from Argentina, who reached a career-high singles ranking of World No. 31.

De la Peña was born in Buenos Aires. He began playing on the ATP circuit professionally in 1984, when he was 17. He won four ATP World Tour titles in his career, all of which were on clay. He also won six doubles titles – five on clay.

De la Peña is most well known as the former coach of Chilean Fernando González. He was also considered the unofficial captain of the Chilean Davis Cup team.

As well as González, de la Peña has coached other tennis players, like Franco Squillari, Martín Rodríguez, Guillermo Coria, and a number of other Chilean and Argentine tennis players.

De la Peña currently runs occasional tennis clinics in Santiago, Chile, and has his own tennis academy.

== Career finals ==
=== Singles (4 wins, 2 losses) ===
Legend (singles)
Grand Slam (0–0)
Tennis Masters Cup (0–0)
ATP Masters Series (0–0)
Grand Prix / ATP Tour (4–2)

Result	W/L	Date	Tournament	Surface	Opponents	Score
Win	1–0	Apr 1985	Marbella, Spain	Clay	(United States) Lawson Duncan	6–0, 6–3
Loss	1–1	Apr 1986	Bari, Italy	Clay	(Sweden) Kent Carlsson	5–7, 7–6, 5–7
Loss	1–2	Oct 1988	São Paulo, Brazil	Hard	(United States) Jay Berger	4–6, 4–6
Win	2–2	May 1989	Florence, Italy	Clay	(Socialist Federal Republic of Yugoslavia) Goran Ivanišević	6–4, 6–3
Win	3–2	Jul 1990	Kitzbühel, Austria	Clay	(Czechoslovakia) Karel Nováček	6–4, 7–6^{(7–4)}, 2–6, 6–2
Win	4–2	Apr 1993	Charlotte, United States	Clay	(Peru) Jaime Yzaga	3–6, 6–3, 6–4

_{Source: ATP}

=== Doubles (6 wins, 5 losses) ===
Result	W/L	Date	Tournament	Surface	Partner	Opponents	Score
Loss	0–1	Nov 1987	Buenos Aires, Argentina	Clay	(United States) Jay Berger	(Spain) Tomás Carbonell (Spain) Sergio Casal	Withdrew
Win	1–1	Nov 1988	São Paulo, Brazil	Hard	(United States) Jay Berger	(Chile) Ricardo Acuña (Spain) Javier Sánchez	5–7, 6–4, 6–3
Win	2–1	Jun 1990	Florence, Italy	Clay	(Spain) Sergi Bruguera	(Brazil) Luiz Mattar (Uruguay) Diego Pérez	3–6, 6–3, 6–4
Loss	2–2	Sep 1990	Palermo, Italy	Clay	(Spain) Carlos Costa	(Spain) Sergio Casal (Spain) Emilio Sánchez	3–6, 4–6
Win	3–2	Apr 1991	Barcelona, Spain	Clay	(Italy) Diego Nargiso	(Germany) Boris Becker (Germany) Eric Jelen	3–6, 7–6, 6–4
Win	4–2	Mar 1992	Casablanca, Morocco	Clay	(Mexico) Jorge Lozano	(Latvia) Ģirts Dzelde (United States) T. J. Middleton	2–6, 6–4, 7–6
Loss	4–3	Jul 1992	Kitzbühel, Austria	Clay	(Czech Republic) Vojtěch Flégl	(Spain) Sergio Casal (Spain) Emilio Sánchez	1–6, 2–6
Win	5–3	Sep 1992	Cologne, Germany	Clay	(Argentina) Gustavo Luza	(Sweden) Ronnie Båthman (Belgium) Libor Pimek	6–7, 6–0, 6–2
Loss	5–4	Oct 1992	Palermo, Italy	Clay	(Czech Republic) Vojtěch Flégl	(Sweden) Johan Donar (Sweden) Ola Jonsson	7–5, 3–6, 4–6
Loss	5–5	Feb 1993	Mexico City, Mexico	Clay	(Mexico) Jorge Lozano	(Mexico) Leonardo Lavalle (Brazil) Jaime Oncins	6–7, 4–6
Win	6–5	Oct 1993	Athens, Greece	Clay	(Mexico) Jorge Lozano	(South Africa) Royce Deppe (United States) John Sullivan	3–6, 6–1, 6–2
