= 1988 Grand Prix (tennis) =

Tennis circuit edition

1988 Nabisco Grand Prix
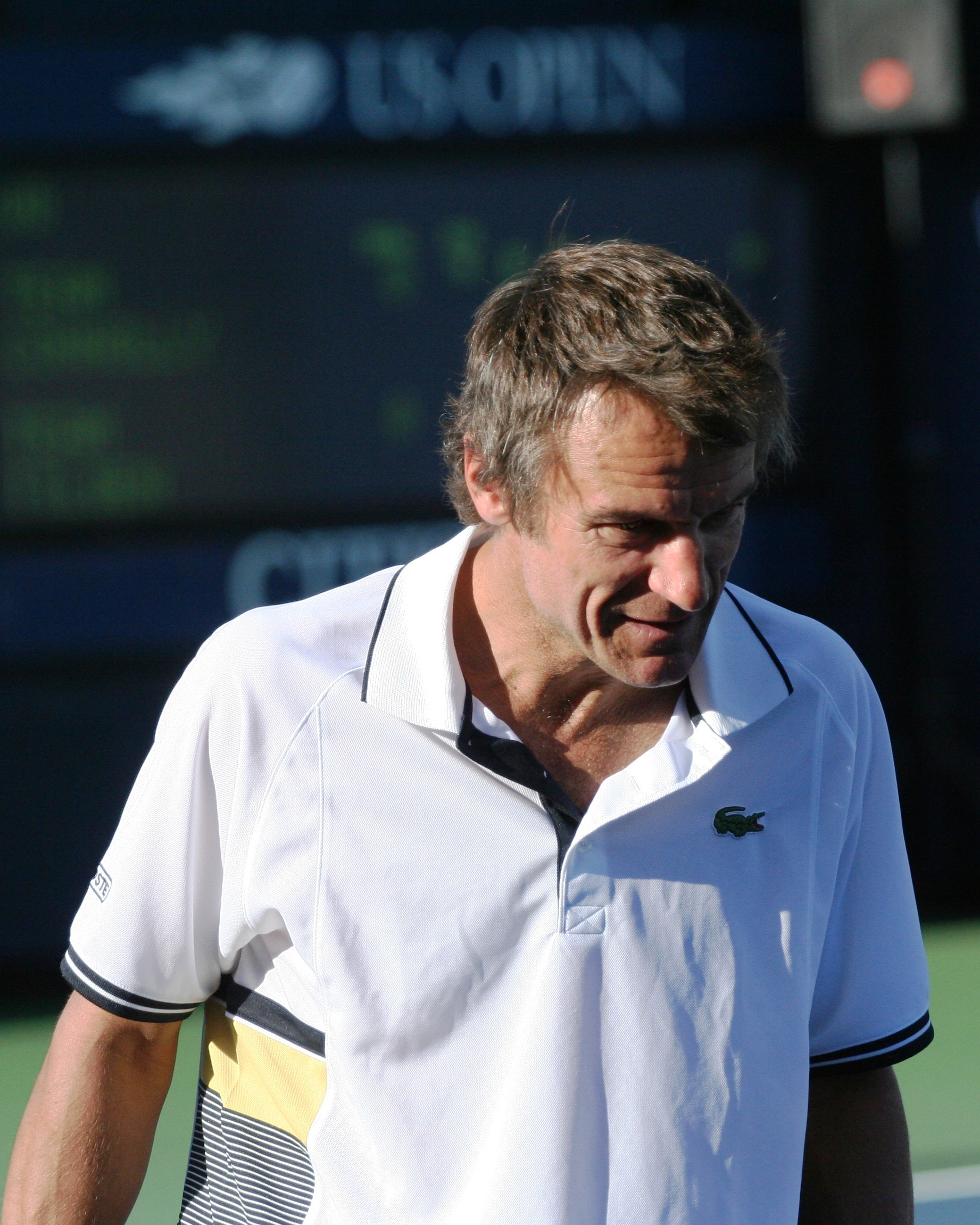
- Mats Wilander finished the year as world No. 1 for the first time in his career. He won six tournaments during the season, including three majors at the Australian Open, the French Open, and the US Open.

Details
- Duration: December 28, 1987 – December 18, 1988
- Edition: 19th
- Tournaments: 77

Achievements (singles)
- Most titles: (West Germany) Boris Becker (7)
- Most finals: (West Germany) Boris Becker (8)
- Prize money leader: (Sweden) Mats Wilander ($1,719,381)
- Points leader: (Sweden) Mats Wilander

Awards
- Player of the year: (Sweden) Mats Wilander
- Doubles team of the year: (United States) Rick Leach; (United States) Jim Pugh
- Most improved player of the year: (United States) Andre Agassi

The 1988 Nabisco Grand Prix was the only men's tennis circuit held that year. It incorporated the four Grand Slam tournaments, three World Championship Tennis tournaments and the Grand Prix tournaments.

== Schedule ==
The table below shows the 1988 Nabisco Grand Prix schedule (a precursor to the ATP Tour).

Key

Grand Slam events
Team events
World Championship Tennis Event
Year-end championships

=== January ===
Week	Tournament	Champions	Runners-up	Semifinalists	Quarterfinalists
28 Dec	South Australian Open; Adelaide, Australia; Hard – $93,400 – 32S/16D; Singles – Doubles	(Australia) Mark Woodforde; 6–2, 6–4	(Australia) Wally Masur	(Australia) John Fitzgerald (Australia) Johan Anderson	(Australia) Roger Rasheed (United States) Bud Schultz (West Germany) Patrick Baur (United States) Joey Rive
28 Dec	South Australian Open; Adelaide, Australia; Hard – $93,400 – 32S/16D; Singles – Doubles	(Australia) Darren Cahill (Australia) Mark Kratzmann; 4–6, 6–2, 7–5	(Australia) Carl Limberger (Australia) Mark Woodforde	(Australia) John Fitzgerald (Australia) Johan Anderson	(Australia) Roger Rasheed (United States) Bud Schultz (West Germany) Patrick Baur (United States) Joey Rive
28 Dec	BP National Championships; Wellington, New Zealand; Hard – US$115,000 – 32S/16D	(India) Ramesh Krishnan; 6–7^{(7–9)}, 6–0, 6–4, 6–3	(Soviet Union) Andrei Chesnokov	(Canada) Chris Pridham (New Zealand) Kelly Evernden	(New Zealand) Bruce Derlin (United States) Tim Wilkison (Netherlands) Menno Oosting (United Kingdom) Jeremy Bates
28 Dec	BP National Championships; Wellington, New Zealand; Hard – US$115,000 – 32S/16D	(United States) Dan Goldie (United States) Rick Leach; 6–2, 6–3	(Australia) Broderick Dyke (Canada) Glenn Michibata	(Canada) Chris Pridham (New Zealand) Kelly Evernden	(New Zealand) Bruce Derlin (United States) Tim Wilkison (Netherlands) Menno Oosting (United Kingdom) Jeremy Bates
4 Jan	Fier New South Wales Open; Sydney, Australia; Grass – $93,400 – 32S/16D; Singles – Doubles	(Australia) John Fitzgerald; 6–3, 6–4	(Soviet Union) Andrei Chesnokov	(South Africa) Christo van Rensburg (United States) Joey Rive	(Soviet Union) Alexander Volkov (Australia) Darren Cahill (South Africa) Barry Moir (Australia) Brad Drewett
4 Jan	Fier New South Wales Open; Sydney, Australia; Grass – $93,400 – 32S/16D; Singles – Doubles	(Australia) Darren Cahill (Australia) Mark Kratzmann; 7–6, 6–4	(United States) Joey Rive (United States) Bud Schultz	(South Africa) Christo van Rensburg (United States) Joey Rive	(Soviet Union) Alexander Volkov (Australia) Darren Cahill (South Africa) Barry Moir (Australia) Brad Drewett
4 Jan	Benson and Hedges Open; Auckland, New Zealand; Hard – $93,400 – 32S/16D; Singles – Doubles	(Israel) Amos Mansdorf; 6–3, 6–4	(India) Ramesh Krishnan	(United States) Jim Pugh (Australia) Broderick Dyke	(Sweden) Peter Lundgren (United States) Jim Grabb (Australia) John Frawley (United States) Dan Goldie
4 Jan	Benson and Hedges Open; Auckland, New Zealand; Hard – $93,400 – 32S/16D; Singles – Doubles	(United States) Marty Davis (United States) Tim Pawsat; 6–3, 3–6, 6–4	(United States) Sammy Giammalva Jr. (United States) Jim Grabb	(United States) Jim Pugh (Australia) Broderick Dyke	(Sweden) Peter Lundgren (United States) Jim Grabb (Australia) John Frawley (United States) Dan Goldie
11 Jan; 18 Jan	Australian Open; Melbourne, Australia; Grand Slam; Hard – $699,984 – 128S/64D/32XD; Singles – Doubles – Mixed doubles	(Sweden) Mats Wilander; 6–3, 6–7^{(5–7)}, 3–6, 6–1, 8–6	(Australia) Pat Cash	(Czechoslovakia) Ivan Lendl (Sweden) Stefan Edberg	(United States) Todd Witsken (Netherlands) Michiel Schapers (Sweden) Anders Järryd (Soviet Union) Andrei Chesnokov
11 Jan; 18 Jan	Australian Open; Melbourne, Australia; Grand Slam; Hard – $699,984 – 128S/64D/32XD; Singles – Doubles – Mixed doubles	(United States) Rick Leach (United States) Jim Pugh; 6–3, 6–2, 6–3	(United Kingdom) Jeremy Bates (Sweden) Peter Lundgren	(Czechoslovakia) Ivan Lendl (Sweden) Stefan Edberg	(United States) Todd Witsken (Netherlands) Michiel Schapers (Sweden) Anders Järryd (Soviet Union) Andrei Chesnokov
11 Jan; 18 Jan	Australian Open; Melbourne, Australia; Grand Slam; Hard – $699,984 – 128S/64D/32XD; Singles – Doubles – Mixed doubles	(Czechoslovakia) Jana Novotná (United States) Jim Pugh; 5–7, 6–2, 6–4	(United States) Martina Navratilova (United States) Tim Gullikson	(Czechoslovakia) Ivan Lendl (Sweden) Stefan Edberg	(United States) Todd Witsken (Netherlands) Michiel Schapers (Sweden) Anders Järryd (Soviet Union) Andrei Chesnokov
25 Jan	Chevrolet Classic; Guarujá, Brazil; Hard – $93,400 – 32S/16D; Singles – Doubles	(Brazil) Luiz Mattar; 6–3, 6–3	(United States) Eliot Teltscher	(Brazil) Danilo Marcelino (Canada) Martin Wostenholme	(Peru) Pablo Arraya (Uruguay) Diego Pérez (Argentina) Roberto Argüello (Brazil) Cássio Motta
25 Jan	Chevrolet Classic; Guarujá, Brazil; Hard – $93,400 – 32S/16D; Singles – Doubles	(Chile) Ricardo Acuña (United States) Luke Jensen; 6–1, 6–4	(Argentina) Javier Frana (Uruguay) Diego Pérez	(Brazil) Danilo Marcelino (Canada) Martin Wostenholme	(Peru) Pablo Arraya (Uruguay) Diego Pérez (Argentina) Roberto Argüello (Brazil) Cássio Motta

=== February ===
Week	Tournament	Champions	Runners-up	Semifinalists	Quarterfinalists
1 Feb	Davis Cup: First round Gävle, Sweden – carpet (i); Prague, Czechoslovakia – carpet (i); Mexico City, Mexico – clay Basel, Switzerland – carpet (i); Essen, West Germany – carpet (i); Aarhus, Denmark – carpet (i); Palermo, Italy – clay New Delhi, India – grass	First round winners Sweden 5–0; Czechoslovakia 5–0; Australia 3–2; France 4–1; West Germany 5–0; Denmark 3–2; Italy 4–1; Yugoslavia 3–2	First round losers New Zealand; Paraguay; Mexico; Switzerland; Brazil; Spain; Israel; India		
8 Feb	Nabisco Grand Prix de Lyon; Lyon, France; Carpet (i) – $240,000 – 32S/16D; Singles – Doubles	(Senegal) Yahiya Doumbia; 6–4, 3–6, 6–3	(United States) Todd Nelson	(France) Yannick Noah (Belgium) Eduardo Masso	(Australia) Broderick Dyke (France) Philippe Pech (New Zealand) Kelly Evernden (United Kingdom) Jeremy Bates
8 Feb	Nabisco Grand Prix de Lyon; Lyon, France; Carpet (i) – $240,000 – 32S/16D; Singles – Doubles	(Australia) Brad Drewett (Australia) Broderick Dyke; 3–6, 6–3, 6–4	(Denmark) Michael Mortensen (United States) Blaine Willenborg	(France) Yannick Noah (Belgium) Eduardo Masso	(Australia) Broderick Dyke (France) Philippe Pech (New Zealand) Kelly Evernden (United Kingdom) Jeremy Bates
8 Feb	ABN World Tennis Tournament; Rotterdam, The Netherlands; Carpet (i) – $325,000 – 32S/16D; Singles – Doubles	(Sweden) Stefan Edberg; 7–6^{(7–5)}, 6–2	(Czechoslovakia) Miloslav Mečíř	(Netherlands) Michiel Schapers (Sweden) Jonas Svensson	(Czechoslovakia) Milan Šrejber (West Germany) Christian Saceanu (Switzerland) Claudio Mezzadri (United States) Jimmy Connors
8 Feb	ABN World Tennis Tournament; Rotterdam, The Netherlands; Carpet (i) – $325,000 – 32S/16D; Singles – Doubles	(West Germany) Patrik Kühnen (West Germany) Tore Meinecke; 7–6^{(7–2)}, 7–6^{(7–2)}	(Sweden) Magnus Gustafsson (Italy) Diego Nargiso	(Netherlands) Michiel Schapers (Sweden) Jonas Svensson	(Czechoslovakia) Milan Šrejber (West Germany) Christian Saceanu (Switzerland) Claudio Mezzadri (United States) Jimmy Connors
15 Feb	Stella Artois Italian Indoors; Milan, Italy; Carpet (i) – $372,500 – 32S/16D	(France) Yannick Noah; 4–4 ret.	(United States) Jimmy Connors	(West Germany) Boris Becker (Czechoslovakia) Milan Šrejber	(France) Henri Leconte (Australia) Pat Cash (Czechoslovakia) Miloslav Mečíř (West Germany) Carl-Uwe Steeb
15 Feb	Stella Artois Italian Indoors; Milan, Italy; Carpet (i) – $372,500 – 32S/16D	(West Germany) Boris Becker (West Germany) Eric Jelen; 6–3, 6–3	(Czechoslovakia) Miloslav Mečíř (Czechoslovakia) Tomáš Šmíd	(West Germany) Boris Becker (Czechoslovakia) Milan Šrejber	(France) Henri Leconte (Australia) Pat Cash (Czechoslovakia) Miloslav Mečíř (West Germany) Carl-Uwe Steeb
15 Feb	Volvo U.S. Indoors; Memphis, Tennessee, US; Hard (i) – $297,500 – 48S/24D; Singles – Doubles	(United States) Andre Agassi; 6–4, 6–4, 7–5	(Sweden) Mikael Pernfors	(United States) Robert Seguso (United States) Kevin Curren	(United States) Jim Grabb (Israel) Amos Mansdorf (United States) David Pate (Ecuador) Andrés Gómez
15 Feb	Volvo U.S. Indoors; Memphis, Tennessee, US; Hard (i) – $297,500 – 48S/24D; Singles – Doubles	(United States) Kevin Curren (United States) David Pate; 6–3, 7–5	(Sweden) Peter Lundgren (Sweden) Mikael Pernfors	(United States) Robert Seguso (United States) Kevin Curren	(United States) Jim Grabb (Israel) Amos Mansdorf (United States) David Pate (Ecuador) Andrés Gómez
22 Feb	Ebel U.S. Pro Indoors; Philadelphia, US; Carpet (i) – $485,000 – 48S/24D; Singles – Doubles	(United States) Tim Mayotte; 4–6, 6–2, 6–2, 6–3	(Australia) John Fitzgerald	(Mexico) Jorge Lozano (South Africa) Christo van Rensburg	(United States) Kevin Curren (United States) Dan Goldie (United States) Sammy Giammalva Jr. (United States) Jim Grabb
22 Feb	Ebel U.S. Pro Indoors; Philadelphia, US; Carpet (i) – $485,000 – 48S/24D; Singles – Doubles	(New Zealand) Kelly Evernden (United States) Johan Kriek; 6–4 6–3	(United States) Kevin Curren (South Africa) Danie Visser	(Mexico) Jorge Lozano (South Africa) Christo van Rensburg	(United States) Kevin Curren (United States) Dan Goldie (United States) Sammy Giammalva Jr. (United States) Jim Grabb
22 Feb	Open de Lorraine; Metz, France; Carpet (i) – $93,400 – 32S/16D	(Sweden) Jonas Svensson; 6–2, 6–4	(Netherlands) Michiel Schapers	(West Germany) Eric Jelen (West Germany) Carl-Uwe Steeb	(Netherlands) Menno Oosting (West Germany) Christian Saceanu (Sweden) Magnus Gustafsson (Sweden) Christian Bergström
22 Feb	Open de Lorraine; Metz, France; Carpet (i) – $93,400 – 32S/16D	(Czechoslovakia) Jaroslav Navrátil (Netherlands) Tom Nijssen; 6–2, 6–7, 7–6	(United States) Rill Baxter (Nigeria) Nduka Odizor	(West Germany) Eric Jelen (West Germany) Carl-Uwe Steeb	(Netherlands) Menno Oosting (West Germany) Christian Saceanu (Sweden) Magnus Gustafsson (Sweden) Christian Bergström
29 Feb	Newsweek Champions Cup; Indian Wells, California, US; Hard – $510,000 – 56S/28D; Singles – Doubles	(West Germany) Boris Becker; 7–5, 6–4, 2–6, 6–4	(Spain) Emilio Sánchez	(United States) Andre Agassi (Australia) Pat Cash	(Sweden) Mikael Pernfors (United States) Johan Kriek (Israel) Amos Mansdorf (Czechoslovakia) Miloslav Mečíř
29 Feb	Newsweek Champions Cup; Indian Wells, California, US; Hard – $510,000 – 56S/28D; Singles – Doubles	(West Germany) Boris Becker (France) Guy Forget; 6–4, 6–4	(Mexico) Jorge Lozano (United States) Todd Witsken	(United States) Andre Agassi (Australia) Pat Cash	(Sweden) Mikael Pernfors (United States) Johan Kriek (Israel) Amos Mansdorf (Czechoslovakia) Miloslav Mečíř

=== March ===
Week	Tournament	Champions	Runners-up	Semifinalists	Quarterfinalists
7 Mar	DuPont Classic; Orlando, Florida, US; Hard – $297,500 – 32S/16D	(Soviet Union) Andrei Chesnokov; 7–6^{(8–6)}, 6–1	(Czechoslovakia) Miloslav Mečíř	(United States) Jay Berger (United States) David Pate	(United States) Aaron Krickstein (Israel) Amos Mansdorf (Argentina) Martín Jaite (United States) Andre Agassi
7 Mar	DuPont Classic; Orlando, Florida, US; Hard – $297,500 – 32S/16D	(France) Guy Forget (France) Yannick Noah; 6–4, 6–4	(United States) Sherwood Stewart (Australia) Kim Warwick	(United States) Jay Berger (United States) David Pate	(United States) Aaron Krickstein (Israel) Amos Mansdorf (Argentina) Martín Jaite (United States) Andre Agassi
14 Mar; 21 Mar	Lipton International Players Championships; Key Biscayne, Florida, US; Hard – $745,000 – 128S/64D; Singles – Doubles	(Sweden) Mats Wilander; 6–4, 4–6, 6–4, 6–4	(United States) Jimmy Connors	(France) Yannick Noah (Czechoslovakia) Miloslav Mečíř	(United States) Aaron Krickstein (Soviet Union) Andrei Chesnokov (United States) Jay Berger (Sweden) Anders Järryd
14 Mar; 21 Mar	Lipton International Players Championships; Key Biscayne, Florida, US; Hard – $745,000 – 128S/64D; Singles – Doubles	(Australia) John Fitzgerald (Sweden) Anders Järryd; 6–4, 6–4	(United States) Ken Flach (United States) Robert Seguso	(France) Yannick Noah (Czechoslovakia) Miloslav Mečíř	(United States) Aaron Krickstein (Soviet Union) Andrei Chesnokov (United States) Jay Berger (Sweden) Anders Järryd
28 Mar	Buick WCT Finals; Dallas, Texas, US; Carpet (i) – $500,000 – 8S; Singles	(West Germany) Boris Becker; 6–4, 1–6, 7–5, 6–2	(Sweden) Stefan Edberg	(United States) Brad Gilbert (France) Yannick Noah	(Ecuador) Andrés Gómez (Australia) Pat Cash (United States) Tim Mayotte (Argentina) Martín Jaite

=== April ===
Week	Tournament	Champions	Runners-up	Semifinalists	Quarterfinalists
4 Apr	Davis Cup: Quarterfinals; Norrköping, Sweden – carpet (i); Clermont-Ferrand, France – clay (i); Frankfurt, West Germany – carpet (i); Belgrade, Yugoslavia – carpet (i)	Quarterfinal winners Sweden 3–2; France 5–0; West Germany 5–0; Yugoslavia 4–1	Quarterfinal losers Czechoslovakia; Australia; Denmark; Italy		
11 Apr	Suntory Japan Open; Tokyo, Japan; Hard – $485,000 – 56S/28D; Singles – Doubles	(United States) John McEnroe; 6–2, 6–2	(Sweden) Stefan Edberg	(United States) Tim Mayotte (United States) Brad Gilbert	(Australia) Brad Drewett (Sweden) Mikael Pernfors (United States) David Pate (Japan) Shuzo Matsuoka
11 Apr	Suntory Japan Open; Tokyo, Japan; Hard – $485,000 – 56S/28D; Singles – Doubles	(Australia) John Fitzgerald (United States) Johan Kriek; 6–4, 6–4	(United States) Steve Denton (United States) David Pate	(United States) Tim Mayotte (United States) Brad Gilbert	(Australia) Brad Drewett (Sweden) Mikael Pernfors (United States) David Pate (Japan) Shuzo Matsuoka
11 Apr	Swatch Open; Nice, France; Clay – $115,000 – 32S/16D; Singles – Doubles	(France) Henri Leconte; 6–2, 6–2	(France) Jérôme Potier	(Soviet Union) Andrei Chesnokov (France) Guy Forget	(Czechoslovakia) Karel Nováček (Haiti) Ronald Agénor (Spain) Jordi Arrese (Argentina) Guillermo Vilas
11 Apr	Swatch Open; Nice, France; Clay – $115,000 – 32S/16D; Singles – Doubles	(France) Guy Forget (France) Henri Leconte; 4–6, 6–3, 6–4	(Switzerland) Heinz Günthardt (Italy) Diego Nargiso	(Soviet Union) Andrei Chesnokov (France) Guy Forget	(Czechoslovakia) Karel Nováček (Haiti) Ronald Agénor (Spain) Jordi Arrese (Argentina) Guillermo Vilas
11 Apr	Nabisco Grand Prix de la villa de Madrid; Madrid, Spain; Clay – $93,400 – 32S/16D	(Sweden) Kent Carlsson; 6–2, 6–1	(Spain) Fernando Luna	(Argentina) Alberto Mancini (West Germany) Markus Rackl	(Belgium) Eduardo Masso (Australia) Carl Limberger (Spain) Sergio Casal (Spain) Alberto Tous
11 Apr	Nabisco Grand Prix de la villa de Madrid; Madrid, Spain; Clay – $93,400 – 32S/16D	(Spain) Sergio Casal (Spain) Emilio Sánchez; 6–7^{(7–9)}, 7–6^{(7–5)}, 6–3	(Australia) Jason Stoltenberg (Australia) Todd Woodbridge	(Argentina) Alberto Mancini (West Germany) Markus Rackl	(Belgium) Eduardo Masso (Australia) Carl Limberger (Spain) Sergio Casal (Spain) Alberto Tous
18 Apr	KAL Korean Open; Seoul, South Korea; Hard – $93,400 – 32S/16D; Singles – Doubles	(United States) Dan Goldie; 6–3, 6–7^{(5–7)}, 6–0	(United Kingdom) Andrew Castle	(United States) Greg Holmes (United States) Eliot Teltscher	(United States) Joey Rive (Australia) John Fitzgerald (Australia) John Frawley (United States) Todd Nelson
18 Apr	KAL Korean Open; Seoul, South Korea; Hard – $93,400 – 32S/16D; Singles – Doubles	(United Kingdom) Andrew Castle (Argentina) Roberto Saad; 6–7, 6–4, 7–6^{(9–7)}	(United States) Gary Donnelly (United States) Jim Grabb	(United States) Greg Holmes (United States) Eliot Teltscher	(United States) Joey Rive (Australia) John Fitzgerald (Australia) John Frawley (United States) Todd Nelson
18 Apr	Volvo Monte Carlo Open; Roquebrune-Cap-Martin, France; Clay – $375,000 – 48S/24D; Singles – Doubles	(Czechoslovakia) Ivan Lendl; 5–7, 6–4, 7–5, 6–3	(Argentina) Martín Jaite	(France) Yannick Noah (France) Thierry Tulasne	(Sweden) Joakim Nyström (France) Henri Leconte (Ecuador) Andrés Gómez (Italy) Claudio Pistolesi
18 Apr	Volvo Monte Carlo Open; Roquebrune-Cap-Martin, France; Clay – $375,000 – 48S/24D; Singles – Doubles	(Spain) Sergio Casal (Spain) Emilio Sánchez; 6–0, 6–3	(France) Henri Leconte (Czechoslovakia) Ivan Lendl	(France) Yannick Noah (France) Thierry Tulasne	(Sweden) Joakim Nyström (France) Henri Leconte (Ecuador) Andrés Gómez (Italy) Claudio Pistolesi
25 Apr	Ebel German Open; Hamburg, West Germany; Clay – $400,000 – 56S/28D	(Sweden) Kent Carlsson; 6–2, 6–1, 6–4	(France) Henri Leconte	(West Germany) Boris Becker (Spain) Jordi Arrese	(Argentina) Guillermo Pérez Roldán (Sweden) Joakim Nyström (Argentina) Guillermo Vilas (Switzerland) Claudio Mezzadri
25 Apr	Ebel German Open; Hamburg, West Germany; Clay – $400,000 – 56S/28D	(Australia) Darren Cahill (Australia) Laurie Warder; 6–0, 5–7, 6–4	(United States) Rick Leach (United States) Jim Pugh	(West Germany) Boris Becker (Spain) Jordi Arrese	(Argentina) Guillermo Pérez Roldán (Sweden) Joakim Nyström (Argentina) Guillermo Vilas (Switzerland) Claudio Mezzadri
25 Apr	U.S. Clay Court Championships; Charleston, South Carolina, US; Clay – $190,000 – 32S/16D; Singles – Doubles	(United States) Andre Agassi; 6–2, 6–2	(United States) Jimmy Arias	(United States) Lawson Duncan (United States) Jim Courier	(United States) Richey Reneberg (United States) Jay Berger (Argentina) Horacio de la Peña (United States) Aaron Krickstein
25 Apr	U.S. Clay Court Championships; Charleston, South Carolina, US; Clay – $190,000 – 32S/16D; Singles – Doubles	(South Africa) Pieter Aldrich (South Africa) Danie Visser; 7–6, 6–3	(Mexico) Jorge Lozano (United States) Todd Witsken	(United States) Lawson Duncan (United States) Jim Courier	(United States) Richey Reneberg (United States) Jay Berger (Argentina) Horacio de la Peña (United States) Aaron Krickstein

=== May ===
Week	Tournament	Champions	Runners-up	Semifinalists	Quarterfinalists
2 May	Eagle Tournament of Champions; Forest Hills, New York, US; Clay – $485,000 – 64S/32D; Singles – Doubles	(United States) Andre Agassi; 7–5, 7–6^{(7–2)}, 7–5	(Socialist Federal Republic of Yugoslavia) Slobodan Živojinović	(Brazil) Luiz Mattar (United States) Aaron Krickstein	(Sweden) Stefan Edberg (Sweden) Mikael Pernfors (Spain) Alberto Tous (Ecuador) Andrés Gómez
2 May	Eagle Tournament of Champions; Forest Hills, New York, US; Clay – $485,000 – 64S/32D; Singles – Doubles	(Mexico) Jorge Lozano (United States) Todd Witsken; 6–3, 7–6	(South Africa) Pieter Aldrich (South Africa) Danie Visser	(Brazil) Luiz Mattar (United States) Aaron Krickstein	(Sweden) Stefan Edberg (Sweden) Mikael Pernfors (Spain) Alberto Tous (Ecuador) Andrés Gómez
2 May	Bavarian Tennis Championships; Munich, West Germany; Clay – $165,000 – 48S/24D; Singles – Doubles	(Argentina) Guillermo Pérez Roldán; 7–5, 6–3	(Sweden) Jonas Svensson	(Australia) Wally Masur (Spain) Emilio Sánchez	(Sweden) Anders Järryd (Soviet Union) Andrei Chesnokov (West Germany) Tore Meinecke (West Germany) Carl-Uwe Steeb
2 May	Bavarian Tennis Championships; Munich, West Germany; Clay – $165,000 – 48S/24D; Singles – Doubles	(United States) Rick Leach (United States) Jim Pugh; 6–1, 3–6, 6–3	(Argentina) Alberto Mancini (Argentina) Christian Miniussi	(Australia) Wally Masur (Spain) Emilio Sánchez	(Sweden) Anders Järryd (Soviet Union) Andrei Chesnokov (West Germany) Tore Meinecke (West Germany) Carl-Uwe Steeb
9 May	Italian Open; Rome, Italy; Clay – $595,000 – 64S/32D; Singles – Doubles	(Czechoslovakia) Ivan Lendl; 2–6, 6–4, 6–2, 4–6, 6–4	(Argentina) Guillermo Pérez Roldán	(Sweden) Kent Carlsson (Haiti) Ronald Agénor	(Peru) Jaime Yzaga (France) Yannick Noah (Ecuador) Andrés Gómez (United States) Andre Agassi
9 May	Italian Open; Rome, Italy; Clay – $595,000 – 64S/32D; Singles – Doubles	(Mexico) Jorge Lozano (United States) Todd Witsken; 6–3, 6–3	(Sweden) Anders Järryd (Czechoslovakia) Tomáš Šmíd	(Sweden) Kent Carlsson (Haiti) Ronald Agénor	(Peru) Jaime Yzaga (France) Yannick Noah (Ecuador) Andrés Gómez (United States) Andre Agassi
16 May	Torneo Internazionale Città di Firenze; Florence, Italy; Clay – $93,400 – 32S/16D; Singles – Doubles	(Italy) Massimiliano Narducci; 3–6, 6–1, 6–4	(Italy) Claudio Panatta	(United States) Lawson Duncan (Peru) Pablo Arraya	(Argentina) Alberto Mancini (Chile) Pedro Rebolledo (Argentina) Javier Frana (Peru) Jaime Yzaga
16 May	Torneo Internazionale Città di Firenze; Florence, Italy; Clay – $93,400 – 32S/16D; Singles – Doubles	(Argentina) Javier Frana (Argentina) Christian Miniussi; 7–6, 6–4	(Italy) Claudio Pistolesi (Austria) Horst Skoff	(United States) Lawson Duncan (Peru) Pablo Arraya	(Argentina) Alberto Mancini (Chile) Pedro Rebolledo (Argentina) Javier Frana (Peru) Jaime Yzaga
23 May; 30 May	French Open; Paris, France; Grand Slam $1,645,000 – Clay – 128S/64D/56XD; Singles – Doubles – Mixed doubles	(Sweden) Mats Wilander; 7–5, 6–2, 6–1	(France) Henri Leconte	(Sweden) Jonas Svensson (United States) Andre Agassi	(Czechoslovakia) Ivan Lendl (Soviet Union) Andrei Chesnokov (Spain) Emilio Sánchez (Argentina) Guillermo Pérez Roldán
23 May; 30 May	French Open; Paris, France; Grand Slam $1,645,000 – Clay – 128S/64D/56XD; Singles – Doubles – Mixed doubles	(Ecuador) Andrés Gómez (Spain) Emilio Sánchez; 6–3, 6–7^{(8–10)}, 6–4, 6–3	(Australia) John Fitzgerald (Sweden) Anders Järryd	(Sweden) Jonas Svensson (United States) Andre Agassi	(Czechoslovakia) Ivan Lendl (Soviet Union) Andrei Chesnokov (Spain) Emilio Sánchez (Argentina) Guillermo Pérez Roldán
23 May; 30 May	French Open; Paris, France; Grand Slam $1,645,000 – Clay – 128S/64D/56XD; Singles – Doubles – Mixed doubles	(United States) Lori McNeil (Mexico) Jorge Lozano; 7–5, 6–2	(Netherlands) Brenda Schultz-McCarthy (Netherlands) Michiel Schapers	(Sweden) Jonas Svensson (United States) Andre Agassi	(Czechoslovakia) Ivan Lendl (Soviet Union) Andrei Chesnokov (Spain) Emilio Sánchez (Argentina) Guillermo Pérez Roldán

=== June ===
Week	Tournament	Champions	Runners-up	Semifinalists	Quarterfinalists
6 Jun	Stella Artois Grass Court Championships; London, Great Britain; Grass – $340,000 – 64S/32D; Singles – Doubles	(West Germany) Boris Becker; 6–1, 3–6, 6–3	(Sweden) Stefan Edberg	(France) Guy Forget (Australia) Darren Cahill	(South Africa) Christo van Rensburg (Australia) Broderick Dyke (West Germany) Eric Jelen (United States) Kevin Curren
6 Jun	Stella Artois Grass Court Championships; London, Great Britain; Grass – $340,000 – 64S/32D; Singles – Doubles	(United States) Ken Flach (United States) Robert Seguso; 6–2, 7–6	(South Africa) Pieter Aldrich (South Africa) Danie Visser	(France) Guy Forget (Australia) Darren Cahill	(South Africa) Christo van Rensburg (Australia) Broderick Dyke (West Germany) Eric Jelen (United States) Kevin Curren
6 Jun	Bologna Open; Bologna, Italy; Clay – $93,400 – 32S/16D; Singles – Doubles	(Argentina) Alberto Mancini; 7–5, 7–6^{(7–4)}	(Spain) Emilio Sánchez	(Sweden) Kent Carlsson (Argentina) Martín Jaite	(Italy) Omar Camporese (Uruguay) Marcelo Filippini (Spain) Tomás Carbonell (Spain) Javier Sánchez
6 Jun	Bologna Open; Bologna, Italy; Clay – $93,400 – 32S/16D; Singles – Doubles	(Spain) Emilio Sánchez (Spain) Javier Sánchez; 6–1, 7–6	(Switzerland) Rolf Hertzog (Switzerland) Marc Walder	(Sweden) Kent Carlsson (Argentina) Martín Jaite	(Italy) Omar Camporese (Uruguay) Marcelo Filippini (Spain) Tomás Carbonell (Spain) Javier Sánchez
13 Jun	Bristol Trophy; Bristol, Great Britain; Grass – $93,400 – 32S/16D; Singles – Doubles	(West Germany) Christian Saceanu; 6–4, 2–6, 6–2	(India) Ramesh Krishnan	(United States) Derrick Rostagno (United States) Mark Dickson	(United States) Matt Anger (Belgium) Eduardo Masso (West Germany) Eric Jelen (United Kingdom) Steve Shaw
13 Jun	Bristol Trophy; Bristol, Great Britain; Grass – $93,400 – 32S/16D; Singles – Doubles	(Australia) Peter Doohan (Australia) Laurie Warder; 2–6, 6–4, 7–5	(United States) Marty Davis (United States) Tim Pawsat	(United States) Derrick Rostagno (United States) Mark Dickson	(United States) Matt Anger (Belgium) Eduardo Masso (West Germany) Eric Jelen (United Kingdom) Steve Shaw
13 Jun	Athens Open; Athens, Greece; Clay – $93,400 – 32S/16D; Singles – Doubles	(Austria) Horst Skoff; 6–3, 2–6, 6–2	(Socialist Federal Republic of Yugoslavia) Bruno Orešar	(Sweden) Christer Allgårdh (Peru) Pablo Arraya	(West Germany) Markus Rackl (Czechoslovakia) Karel Nováček (West Germany) Pavel Vojtíšek (Spain) Tomás Carbonell
13 Jun	Athens Open; Athens, Greece; Clay – $93,400 – 32S/16D; Singles – Doubles	(Sweden) Rikard Bergh (Sweden) Per Henricsson; 2–6, 6–4, 7–5	(Peru) Pablo Arraya (Czechoslovakia) Karel Nováček	(Sweden) Christer Allgårdh (Peru) Pablo Arraya	(West Germany) Markus Rackl (Czechoslovakia) Karel Nováček (West Germany) Pavel Vojtíšek (Spain) Tomás Carbonell
20 Jun; 27 Jun	Wimbledon Championships; London, Great Britain; Grand Slam; Grass – $1,815,396 – 128S/64D/64XD; Singles – Doubles – Mixed doubles	(Sweden) Stefan Edberg; 4–6, 7–6^{(7–2)}, 6–4, 6–2	(West Germany) Boris Becker	(Czechoslovakia) Ivan Lendl (Czechoslovakia) Miloslav Mečíř	(United States) Tim Mayotte (Australia) Pat Cash (West Germany) Patrik Kühnen (Sweden) Mats Wilander
20 Jun; 27 Jun	Wimbledon Championships; London, Great Britain; Grand Slam; Grass – $1,815,396 – 128S/64D/64XD; Singles – Doubles – Mixed doubles	(United States) Ken Flach (United States) Robert Seguso; 6–4, 2–6, 6–4, 7–6^{(7–3)}	(Australia) John Fitzgerald (Sweden) Anders Järryd	(Czechoslovakia) Ivan Lendl (Czechoslovakia) Miloslav Mečíř	(United States) Tim Mayotte (Australia) Pat Cash (West Germany) Patrik Kühnen (Sweden) Mats Wilander
20 Jun; 27 Jun	Wimbledon Championships; London, Great Britain; Grand Slam; Grass – $1,815,396 – 128S/64D/64XD; Singles – Doubles – Mixed doubles	(United States) Zina Garrison (United States) Sherwood Stewart; 6–1, 7–6^{(7–3)}	(United States) Gretchen Magers (United States) Kelly Jones	(Czechoslovakia) Ivan Lendl (Czechoslovakia) Miloslav Mečíř	(United States) Tim Mayotte (Australia) Pat Cash (West Germany) Patrik Kühnen (Sweden) Mats Wilander

=== July ===
Week	Tournament	Champions	Runners-up	Semifinalists	Quarterfinalists
4 Jul	Shawmut U.S. Pro Championships; Boston, US; Clay – $297,500 – 56S/28D; Singles – Doubles	(Austria) Thomas Muster; 6–2, 6–2	(United States) Lawson Duncan	(Argentina) Horacio de la Peña (Socialist Federal Republic of Yugoslavia) Bruno Orešar	(Sweden) Mats Wilander (United States) Aaron Krickstein (United States) Michael Kures (United States) Andre Agassi
4 Jul	Shawmut U.S. Pro Championships; Boston, US; Clay – $297,500 – 56S/28D; Singles – Doubles	(Mexico) Jorge Lozano (United States) Todd Witsken; 3–6, 7–5, 6–2	(Socialist Federal Republic of Yugoslavia) Bruno Orešar (Peru) Jaime Yzaga	(Argentina) Horacio de la Peña (Socialist Federal Republic of Yugoslavia) Bruno Orešar	(Sweden) Mats Wilander (United States) Aaron Krickstein (United States) Michael Kures (United States) Andre Agassi
4 Jul	Rado Swiss Open; Gstaad, Switzerland; Clay – $240,000 – 32S/16D	(Australia) Darren Cahill; 6–3, 6–4, 7–6^{(7–2)}	(Switzerland) Jakob Hlasek	(Spain) Sergio Casal (Austria) Horst Skoff	(Czechoslovakia) Milan Šrejber (Czechoslovakia) Marián Vajda (Ecuador) Andrés Gómez (Spain) Emilio Sánchez
4 Jul	Rado Swiss Open; Gstaad, Switzerland; Clay – $240,000 – 32S/16D	(Czechoslovakia) Petr Korda (Czechoslovakia) Milan Šrejber; 7–6^{(7–5)}, 7–6^{(7–1)}	(Ecuador) Andrés Gómez (Spain) Emilio Sánchez	(Spain) Sergio Casal (Austria) Horst Skoff	(Czechoslovakia) Milan Šrejber (Czechoslovakia) Marián Vajda (Ecuador) Andrés Gómez (Spain) Emilio Sánchez
4 Jul	Volvo Hall of Fame Championships; Newport, Rhode Island, US; Grass – $115,000 – 32S/16D; Singles – Doubles	(Australia) Wally Masur; 6–2, 6–1	(Australia) Brad Drewett	(South Africa) Pieter Aldrich (India) Vijay Amritraj	(United States) Mike Lee (United States) Paul Annacone (New Zealand) Kelly Evernden (Sweden) Peter Lundgren
4 Jul	Volvo Hall of Fame Championships; Newport, Rhode Island, US; Grass – $115,000 – 32S/16D; Singles – Doubles	(United States) Scott Davis (United States) Tim Wilkison; 6–3, 7–6	(United States) Rick Leach (United States) Jim Pugh	(South Africa) Pieter Aldrich (India) Vijay Amritraj	(United States) Mike Lee (United States) Paul Annacone (New Zealand) Kelly Evernden (Sweden) Peter Lundgren
11 Jul	Swedish Open; Båstad, Sweden; Clay – $215,000 – 48S/24D; Singles – Doubles	(Uruguay) Marcelo Filippini; 2–6, 6–4, 6–4	(Italy) Francesco Cancellotti	(Italy) Paolo Canè (Sweden) Christian Bergström	(Sweden) Joakim Nyström (Spain) Fernando Luna (Czechoslovakia) Karel Nováček (West Germany) Udo Riglewski
11 Jul	Swedish Open; Båstad, Sweden; Clay – $215,000 – 48S/24D; Singles – Doubles	(West Germany) Patrick Baur (West Germany) Udo Riglewski; 6–4, 6–4	(Sweden) Stefan Edberg (Sweden) Niclas Kroon	(Italy) Paolo Canè (Sweden) Christian Bergström	(Sweden) Joakim Nyström (Spain) Fernando Luna (Czechoslovakia) Karel Nováček (West Germany) Udo Riglewski
11 Jul	Mercedes Cup; Stuttgart, West Germany; Clay – $275,000 – 48S/24D; Singles – Doubles	(United States) Andre Agassi; 6–4, 6–2	(Ecuador) Andrés Gómez	(Argentina) Guillermo Pérez Roldán (France) Henri Leconte	(Austria) Thomas Muster (France) Yannick Noah (Haiti) Ronald Agénor (Sweden) Jonas Svensson
11 Jul	Mercedes Cup; Stuttgart, West Germany; Clay – $275,000 – 48S/24D; Singles – Doubles	(Spain) Sergio Casal (Spain) Emilio Sánchez; 6–0, 4–6, 6–4	(Sweden) Anders Järryd (Denmark) Michael Mortensen	(Argentina) Guillermo Pérez Roldán (France) Henri Leconte	(Austria) Thomas Muster (France) Yannick Noah (Haiti) Ronald Agénor (Sweden) Jonas Svensson
18 Jul	OTB Open; Schenectady, United States; Hard – $93,400 – 32S/16D; Singles – Doubles	(United States) Tim Mayotte; 5–7, 6–3, 6–2	(United States) Johan Kriek	(United States) Pete Sampras (Sweden) Thomas Högstedt	(Mexico) Leonardo Lavalle (Jamaica) Doug Burke (United States) Patrick McEnroe (United States) Dan Goldberg
18 Jul	OTB Open; Schenectady, United States; Hard – $93,400 – 32S/16D; Singles – Doubles	(West Germany) Alexander Mronz (United States) Greg Van Emburgh; 6–3, 6–7^{(1–7)}, 7–5	(United States) Paul Annacone (United States) P. McEnroe	(United States) Pete Sampras (Sweden) Thomas Högstedt	(Mexico) Leonardo Lavalle (Jamaica) Doug Burke (United States) Patrick McEnroe (United States) Dan Goldberg
18 Jul	Sovran Bank Classic; Washington, D.C., USA; Hard – $297,500 – 56S/28D	(United States) Jimmy Connors; 6–1, 6–4	(Ecuador) Andrés Gómez	(United States) Aaron Krickstein (United States) Derrick Rostagno	(United States) Jay Berger (United States) Michael Chang (South Africa) Barry Moir (Australia) Darren Cahill
18 Jul	Sovran Bank Classic; Washington, D.C., USA; Hard – $297,500 – 56S/28D	(United States) Rick Leach (United States) Jim Pugh; 3–6, 6–3, 6–3	(Mexico) Jorge Lozano (United States) Todd Witsken	(United States) Aaron Krickstein (United States) Derrick Rostagno	(United States) Jay Berger (United States) Michael Chang (South Africa) Barry Moir (Australia) Darren Cahill
18 Jul	Davis Cup: Semifinals; Båstad, Sweden – clay Dortmund, West Germany – carpet (i)	Semifinal winners Sweden 5–0; West Germany 4–1	Semifinal losers France; Yugoslavia		
25 Jul	Volvo International; Stratton Mountain, United States; Clay – $400,000 – 64S/32D; Singles – Doubles	(United States) Andre Agassi; 6–2, 6–4	(United States) Paul Annacone	(Australia) Darren Cahill (United States) Dan Goldie	(The Bahamas) Roger Smith (United States) Martin Davis (United States) Jim Courier (United States) Jay Berger
25 Jul	Volvo International; Stratton Mountain, United States; Clay – $400,000 – 64S/32D; Singles – Doubles	(Mexico) Jorge Lozano (United States) Todd Witsken; 6–3, 7–6	(South Africa) Pieter Aldrich (South Africa) Danie Visser	(Australia) Darren Cahill (United States) Dan Goldie	(The Bahamas) Roger Smith (United States) Martin Davis (United States) Jim Courier (United States) Jay Berger
25 Jul	Dutch Open; Hilversum, The Netherlands; Clay – $150,000 – 32S/16D; Singles – Doubles	(Spain) Emilio Sánchez; 6–3, 6–1, 3–6, 6–3	(Argentina) Guillermo Pérez Roldán	(Sweden) Magnus Gustafsson (Australia) Mark Woodforde	(Chile) Pedro Rebolledo (Argentina) Alberto Mancini (Switzerland) Claudio Mezzadri (Argentina) Eduardo Bengoechea
25 Jul	Dutch Open; Hilversum, The Netherlands; Clay – $150,000 – 32S/16D; Singles – Doubles	(Spain) Sergio Casal (Spain) Emilio Sánchez; 7–6, 6–3	(Sweden) Magnus Gustafsson (Argentina) Guillermo Pérez Roldán	(Sweden) Magnus Gustafsson (Australia) Mark Woodforde	(Chile) Pedro Rebolledo (Argentina) Alberto Mancini (Switzerland) Claudio Mezzadri (Argentina) Eduardo Bengoechea
25 Jul	Nabisco Grand Prix Passing Shot; Bordeaux, France; Clay – $215,000 – 32S/16D; Singles – Doubles	(Austria) Thomas Muster; 6–3, 6–3	(Haiti) Ronald Agénor	(France) Yannick Noah (Austria) Horst Skoff	(United States) Lawson Duncan (Sweden) Joakim Nyström (Brazil) Luiz Mattar (Sweden) Kent Carlsson
25 Jul	Nabisco Grand Prix Passing Shot; Bordeaux, France; Clay – $215,000 – 32S/16D; Singles – Doubles	(Sweden) Joakim Nyström (Italy) Claudio Panatta; 6–1, 6–4	(Argentina) Christian Miniussi (Italy) Diego Nargiso	(France) Yannick Noah (Austria) Horst Skoff	(United States) Lawson Duncan (Sweden) Joakim Nyström (Brazil) Luiz Mattar (Sweden) Kent Carlsson

=== August ===
Week	Tournament	Champions	Runners-up	Semifinalists	Quarterfinalists
1 Aug	Head Cup; Kitzbühel, Austria; Clay – $240,000 – 64S/32D; Singles – Doubles	(Sweden) Kent Carlsson; 6–1, 6–1, 4–6, 4–6, 6–3	(Spain) Emilio Sánchez	(Brazil) Luiz Mattar (Argentina) Guillermo Pérez Roldán	(Argentina) Alberto Mancini (Austria) Thomas Muster (Czechoslovakia) Marián Vajda (Spain) Jordi Arrese
1 Aug	Head Cup; Kitzbühel, Austria; Clay – $240,000 – 64S/32D; Singles – Doubles	(Spain) Sergio Casal (Spain) Emilio Sánchez; 6–4, 7–6	(Sweden) Joakim Nyström (Italy) Claudio Panatta	(Brazil) Luiz Mattar (Argentina) Guillermo Pérez Roldán	(Argentina) Alberto Mancini (Austria) Thomas Muster (Czechoslovakia) Marián Vajda (Spain) Jordi Arrese
1 Aug	GTE U.S. Men's Hard Court Championships; Indianapolis, US; Hard – $297,500 – 56S/28D	(West Germany) Boris Becker; 6–4, 6–2	(United States) John McEnroe	(United States) Todd Witsken (United States) Robert Seguso	(Senegal) Yahiya Doumbia (United States) Jim Pugh (South Africa) Michael Robertson (United States) Derrick Rostagno
1 Aug	GTE U.S. Men's Hard Court Championships; Indianapolis, US; Hard – $297,500 – 56S/28D	(United States) Rick Leach (United States) Jim Pugh; 4–6, 6–3, 6–4	(United States) Ken Flach (United States) Robert Seguso	(United States) Todd Witsken (United States) Robert Seguso	(Senegal) Yahiya Doumbia (United States) Jim Pugh (South Africa) Michael Robertson (United States) Derrick Rostagno
8 Aug	Cedok Open; Prague, Czechoslovakia; Clay – $140,000 – 32S/16D; Singles – Doubles	(Austria) Thomas Muster; 6–4, 5–7, 6–2	(Argentina) Guillermo Pérez Roldán	(Spain) Fernando Luna (Czechoslovakia) Martin Střelba	(Czechoslovakia) Miloslav Mečíř (United States) Lawson Duncan (Czechoslovakia) Milan Šrejber (Czechoslovakia) Karel Nováček
8 Aug	Cedok Open; Prague, Czechoslovakia; Clay – $140,000 – 32S/16D; Singles – Doubles	(Czechoslovakia) Petr Korda (Czechoslovakia) Jaroslav Navrátil; 7–5, 7–6	(Austria) Thomas Muster (Austria) Horst Skoff	(Spain) Fernando Luna (Czechoslovakia) Martin Střelba	(Czechoslovakia) Miloslav Mečíř (United States) Lawson Duncan (Czechoslovakia) Milan Šrejber (Czechoslovakia) Karel Nováček
8 Aug	Campionati Internazionali della Valle D'Aosta; St. Vincent, Italy; Clay – $125,000 – 32S/16D	(Sweden) Kent Carlsson; 6–0, 6–2	(France) Thierry Champion	(Argentina) Alberto Mancini (Uruguay) Marcelo Filippini	(Argentina) Marcelo Ingaramo (Argentina) Franco Davín (Italy) Francesco Cancellotti (Argentina) Martín Jaite
8 Aug	Campionati Internazionali della Valle D'Aosta; St. Vincent, Italy; Clay – $125,000 – 32S/16D	(Argentina) Alberto Mancini (Argentina) Christian Miniussi; 6–4, 5–7, 6–3	(Italy) Paolo Canè (Hungary) Balázs Taróczy	(Argentina) Alberto Mancini (Uruguay) Marcelo Filippini	(Argentina) Marcelo Ingaramo (Argentina) Franco Davín (Italy) Francesco Cancellotti (Argentina) Martín Jaite
8 Aug	Player's International Canadian Open; Toronto, Ontario, Canada; Hard – $410,000 – 56S/28D; Singles – Doubles	(Czechoslovakia) Ivan Lendl; 7–6^{(12–10)}, 6–2	(United States) Kevin Curren	(United States) Jimmy Connors (Australia) Mark Woodforde	(Australia) John Frawley (Australia) Pat Cash (United States) Tim Mayotte (United States) John McEnroe
8 Aug	Player's International Canadian Open; Toronto, Ontario, Canada; Hard – $410,000 – 56S/28D; Singles – Doubles	(United States) Ken Flach (United States) Robert Seguso; 7–6^{(7–3)}, 6–3	(United Kingdom) Andrew Castle (United States) Tim Wilkison	(United States) Jimmy Connors (Australia) Mark Woodforde	(Australia) John Frawley (Australia) Pat Cash (United States) Tim Mayotte (United States) John McEnroe
15 Aug	Thriftway ATP Championships; Mason, United States; Hard – $485,000 – 64S/32D; Singles – Doubles	(Sweden) Mats Wilander; 3–6, 7–6^{(7–5)}, 7–6^{(7–5)}	(Sweden) Stefan Edberg	(Sweden) Anders Järryd (United States) Aaron Krickstein	(United States) Michael Chang (Switzerland) Jakob Hlasek (United States) Kevin Curren (Australia) Carl Limberger
15 Aug	Thriftway ATP Championships; Mason, United States; Hard – $485,000 – 64S/32D; Singles – Doubles	(United States) Rick Leach (United States) Jim Pugh; 6–2, 6–4	(United States) Jim Grabb (United States) Patrick McEnroe	(Sweden) Anders Järryd (United States) Aaron Krickstein	(United States) Michael Chang (Switzerland) Jakob Hlasek (United States) Kevin Curren (Australia) Carl Limberger
15 Aug	Mennen Cup; Livingston, New Jersey, US; Hard – $93,400 – 32S/16D; Singles – Doubles	(United States) Andre Agassi; 6–2, 6–4	(United States) Jeff Tarango	(Senegal) Yahiya Doumbia (Australia) Simon Youl	(United States) Matt Anger (United States) Marc Flur (United States) Sammy Giammalva Jr. (Socialist Federal Republic of Yugoslavia) Slobodan Živojinović
15 Aug	Mennen Cup; Livingston, New Jersey, US; Hard – $93,400 – 32S/16D; Singles – Doubles	(Canada) Grant Connell (Canada) Glenn Michibata; 2–6, 6–4, 7–5	(United States) Marc Flur (United States) Sammy Giammalva Jr.	(Senegal) Yahiya Doumbia (Australia) Simon Youl	(United States) Matt Anger (United States) Marc Flur (United States) Sammy Giammalva Jr. (Socialist Federal Republic of Yugoslavia) Slobodan Živojinović
22 Aug	Nynex Open; Rye Brook, New York, US; Hard – $93,400 – 32S/16D; Singles – Doubles	(Czechoslovakia) Milan Šrejber; 6–2, 7–6^{(7–3)}	(India) Ramesh Krishnan	(Italy) Diego Nargiso (Argentina) Horacio de la Peña	(United Kingdom) Jeremy Bates (United States) Tim Wilkison (Australia) Simon Youl (Australia) Jason Stoltenberg
22 Aug	Nynex Open; Rye Brook, New York, US; Hard – $93,400 – 32S/16D; Singles – Doubles	(United Kingdom) Andrew Castle (United States) Tim Wilkison; 2–6, 6–4, 7–5	(United Kingdom) Jeremy Bates (Denmark) Michael Mortensen	(Italy) Diego Nargiso (Argentina) Horacio de la Peña	(United Kingdom) Jeremy Bates (United States) Tim Wilkison (Australia) Simon Youl (Australia) Jason Stoltenberg
29 Aug; 5 Sep	US Open; New York City, US; Grand Slam; Hard – $1,833,333 – 128S/64D/32XD; Singles – Doubles – Mixed doubles	(Sweden) Mats Wilander; 6–4, 4–6, 6–3, 5–7, 6–4	(Czechoslovakia) Ivan Lendl	(United States) Andre Agassi (Australia) Darren Cahill	(United States) Derrick Rostagno (United States) Jimmy Connors (United States) Aaron Krickstein (Spain) Emilio Sánchez
29 Aug; 5 Sep	US Open; New York City, US; Grand Slam; Hard – $1,833,333 – 128S/64D/32XD; Singles – Doubles – Mixed doubles	(Spain) Sergio Casal (Spain) Emilio Sánchez w/o	(United States) Rick Leach (United States) Jim Pugh	(United States) Andre Agassi (Australia) Darren Cahill	(United States) Derrick Rostagno (United States) Jimmy Connors (United States) Aaron Krickstein (Spain) Emilio Sánchez
29 Aug; 5 Sep	US Open; New York City, US; Grand Slam; Hard – $1,833,333 – 128S/64D/32XD; Singles – Doubles – Mixed doubles	(Czechoslovakia) Jana Novotná (United States) Jim Pugh; 7–5, 6–3	(Australia) Elizabeth Smylie (United States) Patrick McEnroe	(United States) Andre Agassi (Australia) Darren Cahill	(United States) Derrick Rostagno (United States) Jimmy Connors (United States) Aaron Krickstein (Spain) Emilio Sánchez

=== September ===
Week	Tournament	Champions	Runners-up	Semifinalists	Quarterfinalists
12 Sep	Torneo Godó; Barcelona, Spain; Clay – $372,500 – 56S/28D; Singles – Doubles	(Sweden) Kent Carlsson; 6–3, 6–3, 3–6, 6–1	(Austria) Thomas Muster	(Sweden) Magnus Gustafsson (Uruguay) Marcelo Filippini	(France) Henri Leconte (Argentina) Guillermo Pérez Roldán (Spain) Sergio Casal (Spain) Jordi Arrese
12 Sep	Torneo Godó; Barcelona, Spain; Clay – $372,500 – 56S/28D; Singles – Doubles	(Spain) Sergio Casal (Spain) Emilio Sánchez; 2–6, 6–4, 9–7	(Switzerland) Claudio Mezzadri (Uruguay) Diego Pérez	(Sweden) Magnus Gustafsson (Uruguay) Marcelo Filippini	(France) Henri Leconte (Argentina) Guillermo Pérez Roldán (Spain) Sergio Casal (Spain) Jordi Arrese
19 Sep	Volvo Tennis Los Angeles; Los Angeles, US; Hard – $297,500 – 32S/16D; Singles – Doubles	(Sweden) Mikael Pernfors; 6–2, 7–5	(United States) Andre Agassi	(United States) John McEnroe (United States) Kevin Curren	(Australia) Mark Woodforde (United States) David Pate (United States) Jim Pugh (United States) Jeff Tarango
19 Sep	Volvo Tennis Los Angeles; Los Angeles, US; Hard – $297,500 – 32S/16D; Singles – Doubles	(United States) John McEnroe (Australia) Mark Woodforde; 6–4, 6–4	(Australia) Peter Doohan (United States) Jim Grabb	(United States) John McEnroe (United States) Kevin Curren	(Australia) Mark Woodforde (United States) David Pate (United States) Jim Pugh (United States) Jeff Tarango
19 Sep	Campionati Internazionali di Puglia; Bari, Italy; Clay – $93,400 – 32S/16D	(Austria) Thomas Muster; 2–6, 6–1, 7–5	(Uruguay) Marcelo Filippini	(United States) Lawson Duncan (France) Thierry Champion	(United States) Jimmy Brown (Argentina) Christian Miniussi (France) Thierry Tulasne (Argentina) Alberto Mancini
19 Sep	Campionati Internazionali di Puglia; Bari, Italy; Clay – $93,400 – 32S/16D	(Austria) Thomas Muster (Italy) Claudio Panatta; 6–3, 6–1	(Italy) Francesco Cancellotti (Italy) Simone Colombo	(United States) Lawson Duncan (France) Thierry Champion	(United States) Jimmy Brown (Argentina) Christian Miniussi (France) Thierry Tulasne (Argentina) Alberto Mancini
19 Sep	Barclay Open; Geneva, Switzerland; Clay – $190,000 – 32S/16D; Singles – Doubles	(Czechoslovakia) Marián Vajda; 6–4, 6–4	(Sweden) Kent Carlsson	(Argentina) Horacio de la Peña (Argentina) Eduardo Bengoechea	(Spain) Fernando Luna (Sweden) Christian Bergström (Spain) Jordi Arrese (Chile) Pedro Rebolledo
19 Sep	Barclay Open; Geneva, Switzerland; Clay – $190,000 – 32S/16D; Singles – Doubles	(Iran) Mansour Bahrami (Czechoslovakia) Tomáš Šmíd; 6–4, 6–3	(Argentina) Gustavo Luza (Argentina) Guillermo Pérez Roldán	(Argentina) Horacio de la Peña (Argentina) Eduardo Bengoechea	(Spain) Fernando Luna (Sweden) Christian Bergström (Spain) Jordi Arrese (Chile) Pedro Rebolledo
19 Sep	Olympic Games; Seoul, South Korea; Hard – 64S/32D; Singles – Doubles	(Czechoslovakia) Miloslav Mečíř; 3–6, 6–2, 6–4, 6–2	(United States) Tim Mayotte	(Sweden) Stefan Edberg (United States) Brad Gilbert	(Italy) Paolo Canè (Netherlands) Michiel Schapers (Argentina) Martín Jaite (West Germany) Carl-Uwe Steeb
19 Sep	Olympic Games; Seoul, South Korea; Hard – 64S/32D; Singles – Doubles	(United States) Ken Flach (United States) Robert Seguso; 6–3, 6–4, 6–7^{(5–7)}, 6–7^{(1–7)}, 9–7	(Spain) Sergio Casal (Spain) Emilio Sánchez	(Sweden) Stefan Edberg (United States) Brad Gilbert	(Italy) Paolo Canè (Netherlands) Michiel Schapers (Argentina) Martín Jaite (West Germany) Carl-Uwe Steeb
26 Sep	Campionati Internazionali di Sicilia; Palermo, Italy; Clay – $93,400 – 32S/16D; Singles – Doubles	(Sweden) Mats Wilander; 6–1, 3–6, 6–4	(Sweden) Kent Carlsson	(Argentina) Guillermo Pérez Roldán (Austria) Thomas Muster	(Italy) Claudio Panatta (Argentina) Horacio de la Peña (France) Thierry Tulasne (Argentina) Eduardo Bengoechea
26 Sep	Campionati Internazionali di Sicilia; Palermo, Italy; Clay – $93,400 – 32S/16D; Singles – Doubles	(Peru) Carlos di Laura (Uruguay) Marcelo Filippini; 6–3, 7–5	(Argentina) Alberto Mancini (Argentina) Christian Miniussi	(Argentina) Guillermo Pérez Roldán (Austria) Thomas Muster	(Italy) Claudio Panatta (Argentina) Horacio de la Peña (France) Thierry Tulasne (Argentina) Eduardo Bengoechea
26 Sep	Transamerica Open; San Francisco, California, US; Carpet (i) – $297,500 – 32S/16D; Singles – Doubles	(United States) Michael Chang; 6–2, 6–3	(United States) Johan Kriek	(South Africa) Danie Visser (United States) John McEnroe	(United States) Paul Annacone (Sweden) Mikael Pernfors (United States) Tim Wilkison (United States) Kevin Curren
26 Sep	Transamerica Open; San Francisco, California, US; Carpet (i) – $297,500 – 32S/16D; Singles – Doubles	(United States) John McEnroe (Australia) Mark Woodforde; 6–4, 7–6^{(7–5)}	(United States) Rick Leach (United States) Jim Pugh	(South Africa) Danie Visser (United States) John McEnroe	(United States) Paul Annacone (Sweden) Mikael Pernfors (United States) Tim Wilkison (United States) Kevin Curren

=== October ===
Week	Tournament	Champions	Runners-up	Semifinalists	Quarterfinalists
3 Oct	Eagle Classic; Scottsdale, United States; Hard – $297,500 – 32S/16D; Singles – Doubles	(Sweden) Mikael Pernfors; 6–2, 6–4	(United States) Glenn Layendecker	(United States) Jim Pugh (United States) Kevin Curren	(South Africa) Pieter Aldrich (United States) David Pate (Sweden) Tobias Svantesson (United States) Derrick Rostagno
3 Oct	Eagle Classic; Scottsdale, United States; Hard – $297,500 – 32S/16D; Singles – Doubles	(United States) Scott Davis (United States) Tim Wilkison; 6–4, 7–6^{(7–2)}	(United States) Rick Leach (United States) Jim Pugh	(United States) Jim Pugh (United States) Kevin Curren	(South Africa) Pieter Aldrich (United States) David Pate (Sweden) Tobias Svantesson (United States) Derrick Rostagno
3 Oct	Commonwealth Bank Queensland Open; Brisbane, Australia; Hard (i) – $165,000 – 32S/16D; Singles – Doubles	(United States) Tim Mayotte; 6–4, 6–4	(United States) Marty Davis	(Japan) Shuzo Matsuoka (Australia) Broderick Dyke	(West Germany) Carl-Uwe Steeb (Australia) Jason Stoltenberg (Australia) Richard Fromberg (United States) Leif Shiras
3 Oct	Commonwealth Bank Queensland Open; Brisbane, Australia; Hard (i) – $165,000 – 32S/16D; Singles – Doubles	(West Germany) Eric Jelen (West Germany) Carl-Uwe Steeb; 6–4 6–1	(Canada) Grant Connell (Canada) Glenn Michibata	(Japan) Shuzo Matsuoka (Australia) Broderick Dyke	(West Germany) Carl-Uwe Steeb (Australia) Jason Stoltenberg (Australia) Richard Fromberg (United States) Leif Shiras
3 Oct	Ebel Swiss Indoors; Basel, Switzerland; Hard (i) – $240,000 – 32S/16D	(Sweden) Stefan Edberg; 7–5, 6–3, 3–6, 6–2	(Switzerland) Jakob Hlasek	(Sweden) Jonas Svensson (United States) Jimmy Connors	(Sweden) Magnus Gustafsson (Italy) Diego Nargiso (United States) Aaron Krickstein (Israel) Amos Mansdorf
3 Oct	Ebel Swiss Indoors; Basel, Switzerland; Hard (i) – $240,000 – 32S/16D	(Switzerland) Jakob Hlasek (Czechoslovakia) Tomáš Šmíd; 6–3, 6–1	(United Kingdom) Jeremy Bates (Sweden) Peter Lundgren	(Sweden) Jonas Svensson (United States) Jimmy Connors	(Sweden) Magnus Gustafsson (Italy) Diego Nargiso (United States) Aaron Krickstein (Israel) Amos Mansdorf
10 Oct	Riklis Israel Tennis Center Classic; Tel Aviv, Israel; Hard – $95,000 – 32S/16D; Singles – Doubles	(United States) Brad Gilbert; 4–6, 7–6^{(7–5)}, 6–2	(United States) Aaron Krickstein	(Israel) Amos Mansdorf (South Africa) Christo van Rensburg	(United States) Scott Davis (West Germany) Alexander Mronz (Israel) Shahar Perkiss (West Germany) Patrick Baur
10 Oct	Riklis Israel Tennis Center Classic; Tel Aviv, Israel; Hard – $95,000 – 32S/16D; Singles – Doubles	(The Bahamas) Roger Smith (Kenya) Paul Wekesa; 6–3, 6–3	(West Germany) Patrick Baur (West Germany) Alexander Mronz	(Israel) Amos Mansdorf (South Africa) Christo van Rensburg	(United States) Scott Davis (West Germany) Alexander Mronz (Israel) Shahar Perkiss (West Germany) Patrick Baur
10 Oct	Grand Prix de Tennis de Toulouse; Toulouse, France; Hard (i) – $240,000 – 32S/16D; Singles – Doubles	(United States) Jimmy Connors; 6–2, 6–0	(Soviet Union) Andrei Chesnokov	(Sweden) Christian Bergström (Switzerland) Jakob Hlasek	(France) Henri Leconte (Czechoslovakia) Tomáš Šmíd (Czechoslovakia) Milan Šrejber (Netherlands) Michiel Schapers
10 Oct	Grand Prix de Tennis de Toulouse; Toulouse, France; Hard (i) – $240,000 – 32S/16D; Singles – Doubles	(Netherlands) Tom Nijssen (West Germany) Ricki Osterthun; 6–3, 6–4	(Iran) Mansour Bahrami (France) Guy Forget	(Sweden) Christian Bergström (Switzerland) Jakob Hlasek	(France) Henri Leconte (Czechoslovakia) Tomáš Šmíd (Czechoslovakia) Milan Šrejber (Netherlands) Michiel Schapers
10 Oct	Swan Premium Open; Sydney, Australia; Hard (i) – $372,500 – 32S/16D; Singles – Doubles	(Socialist Federal Republic of Yugoslavia) Slobodan Živojinović; 7–6^{(10–8)}, 6–3, 6–4	(United States) Richard Matuszewski	(United States) Tim Mayotte (Ecuador) Andrés Gómez	(West Germany) Carl-Uwe Steeb (Canada) Glenn Michibata (Canada) Grant Connell (Japan) Shuzo Matsuoka
10 Oct	Swan Premium Open; Sydney, Australia; Hard (i) – $372,500 – 32S/16D; Singles – Doubles	(Australia) Darren Cahill (Australia) John Fitzgerald; 6–3, 6–2	(United States) Marty Davis (Australia) Brad Drewett	(United States) Tim Mayotte (Ecuador) Andrés Gómez	(West Germany) Carl-Uwe Steeb (Canada) Glenn Michibata (Canada) Grant Connell (Japan) Shuzo Matsuoka
17 Oct	C.A. Tennis Trophy; Vienna, Austria; Carpet (i) – $140,000 – 32S/16D; Singles – Doubles	(Austria) Horst Skoff; 4–6, 6–3, 6–4, 6–2	(Austria) Thomas Muster	(United States) Kevin Curren (Soviet Union) Andrei Chesnokov	(Czechoslovakia) Marián Vajda (Netherlands) Michiel Schapers (United States) Richey Reneberg (Sweden) Jonas Svensson
17 Oct	C.A. Tennis Trophy; Vienna, Austria; Carpet (i) – $140,000 – 32S/16D; Singles – Doubles	(Austria) Alex Antonitsch (Hungary) Balázs Taróczy; 4–6, 6–3, 7–6	(United States) Kevin Curren (Czechoslovakia) Tomáš Šmíd	(United States) Kevin Curren (Soviet Union) Andrei Chesnokov	(Czechoslovakia) Marián Vajda (Netherlands) Michiel Schapers (United States) Richey Reneberg (Sweden) Jonas Svensson
17 Oct	Frankfurt Cup; Frankfurt, West Germany; Carpet (i) – $140,000 – 32S/16D; Singles – Doubles	(United States) Tim Mayotte; 4–6, 6–4, 6–3	(Mexico) Leonardo Lavalle	(United States) Jim Pugh (Sweden) Anders Järryd	(West Germany) Patrik Kühnen (United States) Brad Gilbert (New Zealand) Steve Guy (West Germany) Christian Saceanu
17 Oct	Frankfurt Cup; Frankfurt, West Germany; Carpet (i) – $140,000 – 32S/16D; Singles – Doubles	(West Germany) Rüdiger Haas (Socialist Federal Republic of Yugoslavia) Goran Ivanišević; 1–6, 7–5, 6–3	(United Kingdom) Jeremy Bates (Netherlands) Tom Nijssen	(United States) Jim Pugh (Sweden) Anders Järryd	(West Germany) Patrik Kühnen (United States) Brad Gilbert (New Zealand) Steve Guy (West Germany) Christian Saceanu
17 Oct	Seiko Super Tennis; Tokyo, Japan; Carpet (i) – $500,000 – 32S/16D; Singles – Doubles	(West Germany) Boris Becker; 7–6^{(7–4)}, 6–4	(Australia) John Fitzgerald	(Sweden) Stefan Edberg (United States) Richard Matuszewski	(United States) Paul Chamberlin (Ecuador) Andrés Gómez (Japan) Shuzo Matsuoka (West Germany) Eric Jelen
17 Oct	Seiko Super Tennis; Tokyo, Japan; Carpet (i) – $500,000 – 32S/16D; Singles – Doubles	(Ecuador) Andrés Gómez (Socialist Federal Republic of Yugoslavia) Slobodan Živojinović; 7–5, 5–7, 6–3	(West Germany) Boris Becker (West Germany) Eric Jelen	(Sweden) Stefan Edberg (United States) Richard Matuszewski	(United States) Paul Chamberlin (Ecuador) Andrés Gómez (Japan) Shuzo Matsuoka (West Germany) Eric Jelen
24 Oct	Open de la Ville de Paris; Paris, France; Carpet (i) – $810,000 – 32S/16D; Singles – Doubles	(Israel) Amos Mansdorf; 6–3, 6–2, 6–3	(United States) Brad Gilbert	(Switzerland) Jakob Hlasek (United States) Tim Mayotte	(United States) Aaron Krickstein (United States) John McEnroe (France) Guy Forget (Soviet Union) Andrei Chesnokov
24 Oct	Open de la Ville de Paris; Paris, France; Carpet (i) – $810,000 – 32S/16D; Singles – Doubles	(United States) Paul Annacone (Australia) John Fitzgerald; 6–2, 6–2	(United States) Jim Grabb (South Africa) van Rensburg	(Switzerland) Jakob Hlasek (United States) Tim Mayotte	(United States) Aaron Krickstein (United States) John McEnroe (France) Guy Forget (Soviet Union) Andrei Chesnokov
31 Oct	Ford Cup; São Paulo, Brazil; Hard – $100,000 – 32S/16D; Singles – Doubles	(United States) Jay Berger; 6–4, 6–4	(Argentina) Horacio de la Peña	(United States) Dan Cassidy (Brazil) Cássio Motta	(Brazil) César Kist (Peru) Jaime Yzaga (Socialist Federal Republic of Yugoslavia) Bruno Orešar (Argentina) Javier Frana
31 Oct	Ford Cup; São Paulo, Brazil; Hard – $100,000 – 32S/16D; Singles – Doubles	(United States) Jay Berger (Argentina) Horacio de la Peña; 5–7, 6–4, 6–3	(Chile) Ricardo Acuña (Spain) Javier Sánchez	(United States) Dan Cassidy (Brazil) Cássio Motta	(Brazil) César Kist (Peru) Jaime Yzaga (Socialist Federal Republic of Yugoslavia) Bruno Orešar (Argentina) Javier Frana
31 Oct	Stockholm Open; Stockholm, Sweden; Hard (i) – $642,500 – 56S/32D; Singles – Doubles	(West Germany) Boris Becker; 6–4, 6–1, 6–1	(Sweden) Peter Lundgren	(United States) Dan Goldie (United States) Jim Courier	(Spain) Emilio Sánchez (United States) Robert Seguso (Sweden) Jan Gunnarsson (Italy) Paolo Canè
31 Oct	Stockholm Open; Stockholm, Sweden; Hard (i) – $642,500 – 56S/32D; Singles – Doubles	(United States) Kevin Curren (United States) Jim Grabb; 7–5, 7–5	(United States) Paul Annacone (Australia) John Fitzgerald	(United States) Dan Goldie (United States) Jim Courier	(Spain) Emilio Sánchez (United States) Robert Seguso (Sweden) Jan Gunnarsson (Italy) Paolo Canè

=== November ===
Week	Tournament	Champions	Runners-up	Semifinalists	Quarterfinalists
7 Nov	Argentine Open; Buenos Aires, Argentina; Clay – $93,400 – 32S/16D; Singles – Doubles	(Spain) Javier Sánchez; 6–2, 7–6	(Argentina) Guillermo Pérez Roldán	(Argentina) Alberto Mancini (Spain) Juan Aguilera	(Argentina) Roberto Argüello (Argentina) Eduardo Bengoechea (Spain) Carlos Costa (United States) Jay Berger
7 Nov	Argentine Open; Buenos Aires, Argentina; Clay – $93,400 – 32S/16D; Singles – Doubles	(Spain) Carlos Costa (Spain) Javier Sánchez; 6–3, 3–6, 6–3	(Argentina) Eduardo Bengoechea (Argentina) José Luis Clerc	(Argentina) Alberto Mancini (Spain) Juan Aguilera	(Argentina) Roberto Argüello (Argentina) Eduardo Bengoechea (Spain) Carlos Costa (United States) Jay Berger
7 Nov	Benson & Hedges Championships; Wembley, London, Great Britain; Carpet (i) – $335,000 – 32S/16D; Singlea – Doubles	(Switzerland) Jakob Hlasek; 6–7^{(4–7)}, 3–6, 6–4, 6–0, 7–5	(Sweden) Jonas Svensson	(France) Henri Leconte (Australia) John Fitzgerald	(Czechoslovakia) Milan Šrejber (Israel) Amos Mansdorf (United States) Jim Courier (United States) Robert Seguso
7 Nov	Benson & Hedges Championships; Wembley, London, Great Britain; Carpet (i) – $335,000 – 32S/16D; Singlea – Doubles	(United States) Ken Flach (United States) Robert Seguso; 7–5, 6–2	(United States) Martin Davis (Australia) Brad Drewett	(France) Henri Leconte (Australia) John Fitzgerald	(Czechoslovakia) Milan Šrejber (Israel) Amos Mansdorf (United States) Jim Courier (United States) Robert Seguso
14 Nov	South African Open; Johannesburg, South Africa; Hard (i) – $297,500 – 32S/16D	(Switzerland) Jakob Hlasek; 6–7^{(1–7)}, 6–4, 6–1, 7–6^{(7–4)}	(South Africa) Christo van Rensburg	(South Africa) Pieter Aldrich (United States) Brad Gilbert	(South Africa) Gary Muller (United States) Kevin Curren (South Africa) Piet Norval (United States) Matt Anger
14 Nov	South African Open; Johannesburg, South Africa; Hard (i) – $297,500 – 32S/16D	(United States) Kevin Curren (United States) David Pate; 7–6, 6–4	(South Africa) Gary Muller (United States) Tim Wilkison	(South Africa) Pieter Aldrich (United States) Brad Gilbert	(South Africa) Gary Muller (United States) Kevin Curren (South Africa) Piet Norval (United States) Matt Anger
14 Nov	Little Caesars Championship; Detroit, Michigan, US; Carpet (i) – $297,500 – 32S/16D	(United States) John McEnroe; 7–5, 6–2	(United States) Aaron Krickstein	(United States) Leif Shiras (New Zealand) Kelly Evernden	(United States) Pete Sampras (United States) Paul Annacone (United States) Dan Goldie (United States) Jim Courier
14 Nov	Little Caesars Championship; Detroit, Michigan, US; Carpet (i) – $297,500 – 32S/16D	(United States) Rick Leach (United States) Jim Pugh; 6–4, 6–1	(United States) Ken Flach (United States) Robert Seguso	(United States) Leif Shiras (New Zealand) Kelly Evernden	(United States) Pete Sampras (United States) Paul Annacone (United States) Dan Goldie (United States) Jim Courier
21 Nov	Donnay Indoor Championships; Brussels, Belgium; Carpet (i) – $372,500 – 32S/16D; Singles – Doubles	(France) Henri Leconte; 7–6^{(7–3)}, 7–6^{(8–6)}, 6–4	(Switzerland) Jakob Hlasek	(Australia) John Fitzgerald (West Germany) Patrik Kühnen	(Australia) Wally Masur (West Germany) Eric Jelen (France) Éric Winogradsky (Netherlands) Tom Nijssen
21 Nov	Donnay Indoor Championships; Brussels, Belgium; Carpet (i) – $372,500 – 32S/16D; Singles – Doubles	(Australia) Wally Masur (Netherlands) Tom Nijssen; W/O	(Australia) John Fitzgerald (Czechoslovakia) Tomáš Šmíd	(Australia) John Fitzgerald (West Germany) Patrik Kühnen	(Australia) Wally Masur (West Germany) Eric Jelen (France) Éric Winogradsky (Netherlands) Tom Nijssen
21 Nov	Citibank Open; Itaparica, Brazil; Hard – $275,000 – 32S/16D; Singles – Doubles	(Peru) Jaime Yzaga; 7–6^{(7–4)}, 6–2	(Argentina) Javier Frana	(Spain) Javier Sánchez (Argentina) Martín Jaite	(Uruguay) Diego Pérez (Argentina) Alberto Mancini (Spain) Sergio Casal (Soviet Union) Andrei Chesnokov
21 Nov	Citibank Open; Itaparica, Brazil; Hard – $275,000 – 32S/16D; Singles – Doubles	(Spain) Sergio Casal (Spain) Emilio Sánchez; 7–6^{(7–4)}, 7–6^{(7–4)}	(Mexico) Jorge Lozano (United States) Todd Witsken	(Spain) Javier Sánchez (Argentina) Martín Jaite	(Uruguay) Diego Pérez (Argentina) Alberto Mancini (Spain) Sergio Casal (Soviet Union) Andrei Chesnokov
28 Nov	Nabisco Masters Singles; New York City, US $750,000 – Carpet (i) – 8S; Singles	(West Germany) Boris Becker; 5–7, 7–6^{(7–5)}, 3–6, 6–2, 7–6^{(7–5)}	(Czechoslovakia) Ivan Lendl	(Sweden) Stefan Edberg (Switzerland) Jakob Hlasek	Round robin: (United States) Tim Mayotte (United States) Andre Agassi (Sweden) Mats Wilander (France) Henri Leconte

=== December ===
Week	Tournament	Champions	Runners-up	Semifinalists	Quarterfinalists
5 Dec	Nabisco Masters Doubles; London, Great Britain $200,000 – Carpet (i) – 8D; Doubles	(United States) Rick Leach (United States) Jim Pugh; 6–4, 6–3, 2–6, 6–0	(Spain) Sergio Casal (Spain) Emilio Sánchez	(Mexico) Jorge Lozano / (United States) Todd Witsken (United States) John Fitzgerald / (Sweden) Anders Järryd	
12 Dec	Davis Cup: Final; Gothenburg, Sweden – clay (i)	West Germany; 4–1	Sweden		

== Points system ==
The tournaments of the 1988 Grand Prix circuit were divided into forty point categories. The highest points were allocated to the Grand Slam tournaments; French Open, the Wimbledon Championships, the US Open and the Australian Open. The singles points allocation is as follows:

	Grand Slam	2 week tournament	$1,000,000+	$975,000+	$950,000+	$925,000+	$900,000+	$875,000+	$850,000+	$825,000+	$800,000+	$775,000+	$750,000+	$725,000+	Buick-WCT	$700,000+	$675,000+	$650,000+	$625,000+	$600,000+	$575,000+	$550,000+	$525,000+	$500,000+	$475,000+	$450,000+	$425,000+	$400,000+	$375,000+	$350,000+	$325,000+	$300,000+	$275,000+	$250,000+	$225,000+	$200,000+	$175,000+	$150,000+	$125,000+	$100,000+
Category	1	2	3	4	5	6	7	8	9	10	11	12	13	14	15	16	17	18	19	20	21	22	23	24	25	26	27	28	29	30	31	32	33	34	35	36	37	38	39	40
Winner	1200	1000	1000	975	950	925	900	875	850	825	800	775	750	725	700	700	675	650	625	600	575	550	525	500	475	450	425	400	375	350	325	300	275	250	225	200	175	150	125	100
Runner-up	840	700	700	683	665	648	630	613	593	578	560	543	525	508	500	490	473	455	438	420	403	385	368	350	333	315	298	280	263	245	228	210	193	175	158	140	123	105	88	70
Semifinalist	480	400	400	390	380	370	360	350	340	330	320	310	300	290	300	280	270	260	250	240	230	220	210	200	190	180	170	160	150	140	130	120	110	100	90	80	70	60	50	40
Quarterfinalist	240	200	200	195	190	185	180	175	170	165	160	155	150	145	150	140	135	130	125	120	115	110	105	100	95	90	85	80	75	70	65	60	55	50	45	40	35	30	25	20
Last 16	120	100	100	98	95	93	90	88	85	83	80	78	75	73	-	70	68	65	63	60	58	55	53	50	48	45	43	40	38	35	33	30	28	25	23	20	18	15	13	10
Last 32	60	50	50	49	48	46	45	44	43	41	40	39	38	36	--	35	34	33	31	30	29	28	26	25	24	23	21	20	19	18	16	15	14	13	11	10	9	8	6	5
Last 64	30	25																																						

== Top tournaments ranked by Grand Prix points & prize money ==
Tournament	Prize money	Category
The four Grand Slam tournaments		1
Lipton Championships, Key Biscayne (2 week tournament)	$745,000	2
Paris Open	$810,000	11
Nabisco Masters	$750,000	
WCT Finals	$500,000	15
Stockholm Open	$642,500	19
Italian Open	$595,000	21
Indian Wells	$510,000	24
Tokyo Indoor	$485,000	25
Forest Hills Tournament of Champions	$485,000	25
Cincinnati Open	$485,000	25
Philadelphia	$485,000	25
Tokyo outdoor	$485,000	25

== ATP rankings ==
As of 1 January 1988
Rk	Name	Nation
1	Ivan Lendl	TCH
2	Stefan Edberg	SWE
3	Mats Wilander	SWE
4	Jimmy Connors	USA
5	Boris Becker	FRG
6	Miloslav Mečíř	TCH
7	Pat Cash	AUS
8	Yannick Noah	FRA
9	Tim Mayotte	USA
10	John McEnroe	USA
11	Andrés Gómez	ECU
12	Kent Carlsson	SWE
13	Brad Gilbert	USA
14	Martín Jaite	ARG
15	Anders Järryd	SWE
16	Joakim Nyström	SWE
17	Emilio Sánchez	ESP
18	David Pate	USA
19	Guillermo Pérez Roldán	ARG
20	Eliot Teltscher	USA

Year-end rankings 1988 (19 December 1988)
Rk	Name	Nation	Points	High	Low	Change
1	Mats Wilander	SWE	157.46	1	3	▲ +2
2	Ivan Lendl	TCH	122.91	1	2	▼ −1
3	Andre Agassi	USA	118.28	3	26	▲ +22
4	Boris Becker	FRG	109.42	4	8	▲ +1
5	Stefan Edberg	SWE	109.28	2	5	▼ −3
6	Kent Carlsson	SWE	84.15	6	16	▲ +6
7	Jimmy Connors	USA	81.76	4	11	▼ −3
8	Jakob Hlasek	SUI	72.00	8	43	▲ +15
9	Henri Leconte	FRA	71.11	9	24	▲ +12
10	Tim Mayotte	USA	67.57	8	13	▼ −1
11	John McEnroe	USA	67.16	10	25	▼ −1
12	Yannick Noah	FRA	62.25	7	12	▼ −4
13	Miloslav Mečíř	TCH	61.69	4	13	▼ −7
14	Andrei Chesnokov	URS	54.00	14	52	▲ +38
15	Aaron Krickstein	USA	52.50	14	64	▲ +46
16	Thomas Muster	AUT	52.15	13	60	▲ +43
17	Emilio Sánchez	ESP	51.55	14	23	=
18	Guillermo Pérez Roldán	ARG	50.83	13	29	▲ +1
19	Mikael Pernfors	SWE	50.28	19	39	▲ +24
20	Pat Cash	AUS	49.75	4	20	▼ −13

== List of tournament winners ==
The list of winners and number of Grand Prix titles won, alphabetically by last name:

- (United States) Andre Agassi – Memphis, Charleston, Forest Hills, Stuttgart, Stratton Mountain, Livingston (6)
- (West Germany) Boris Becker – Indian Wells, Dallas, London, Indianapolis, Tokyo Indoors, Stockholm, Season-Ending Championships (7)
- (United States) Jay Berger – São Paulo (1)
- (Australia) Darren Cahill – Gstaad (1)
- (Sweden) Kent Carlsson – Madrid, Hamburg, Kitzbühel, St. Vincent, Barcelona (5)
- (United States) Michael Chang – San Francisco (1)
- (Soviet Union) Andrei Chesnokov – Orlando (1)
- (United States) Jimmy Connors – Washington, D.C., Toulouse (2)
- (Mali) Yahiya Doumbia – Lyon (1)
- (Sweden) Stefan Edberg – Rotterdam, Wimbledon, Basel (3)
- (Italy) Marcelo Filippini – Båstad (1)
- (Australia) John Fitzgerald – Sydney (1)
- (United States) Brad Gilbert – Tel Aviv (1)
- (United States) Dan Goldie – Seoul (1)
- (Switzerland) Jakob Hlasek – Wembley, Johannesburg (2)
- (India) Ramesh Krishnan – Wellington (1)
- (France) Henri Leconte – Nice, Brussels (2)
- (Czechoslovakia) Ivan Lendl – Monte Carlo, Rome, Canada (3)
- (Italy) Alberto Mancini – Bologna (1)
- (Israel) Amos Mansdorf – Auckland, Paris (2)
- (Australia) Wally Masur – Newport (1)
- (Brazil) Luiz Mattar – Guarujá (1)
- (United States) Tim Mayotte – Philadelphia, Schenectady, Brisbane, Frankfurt (4)
- (United States) John McEnroe – Tokyo, Detroit (2)
- (Czechoslovakia) Miloslav Mečíř – Seoul Olympics (1)
- (Austria) Thomas Muster – Boston, Bordeaux, Prague, Bari (4)
- (Italy) Massimiliano Narducci – Florence (1)
- (France) Yannick Noah – Milan (1)
- (Argentina) Guillermo Pérez Roldán – Munich (1)
- (Sweden) Mikael Pernfors – Los Angeles, Scottsdale (2)
- (West Germany) Christian Saceanu – Bristol (1)
- (Spain) Emilio Sánchez – Hilversum (1)
- (Spain) Javier Sánchez – Buenos Aires (1)
- (Austria) Horst Skoff – Athens, Vienna (2)
- (Czechoslovakia) Milan Šrejber – Rye Brook (1)
- (Sweden) Jonas Svensson – Metz (1)
- (Czechoslovakia) Marián Vajda – Geneva (1)
- (Sweden) Mats Wilander – Australian Open, Miami, Roland Garros, Cincinnati, US Open, Palermo (6)
- (Australia) Mark Woodforde – Adelaide (1)
- (Peru) Jaime Yzaga – Itaparica (1)
- (Socialist Federal Republic of Yugoslavia) Slobodan Živojinović – Sydney Indoors (1)

The following players won their first title in 1988:

- (Australia) Darren Cahill
- (United States) Michael Chang
- (Senegal) Yahiya Doumbia
- (Uruguay) Marcelo Filippini
- (Switzerland) Jakob Hlasek
- (Argentina) Alberto Mancini
- (Italy) Massimiliano Narducci
- (Sweden) Mikael Pernfors
- (West Germany) Christian Saceanu
- (Spain) Javier Sánchez
- (Austria) Horst Skoff
- (Czechoslovakia) Milan Šrejber

== See also ==
- Tennis exhibitions in 1988
- 1988 WTA Tour
