= 1988 ABN World Tennis Tournament =

- Date: 8–14 February
- Edition: 16th
- Category: Grand Prix circuit
- Draw: 32S / 16D
- Prize money: $325,000
- Surface: Carpet / indoor
- Location: Rotterdam, Netherlands
- Venue: Rotterdam Ahoy

Champions

Singles
- (Sweden) Stefan Edberg

Doubles
- (West Germany) Patrik Kühnen / (West Germany) Tore Meinecke
- ABN World Tennis Tournament

The 1988 ABN World Tennis Tournament was a men's tennis tournament played on indoor carpet courts at Rotterdam Ahoy in the Netherlands. It was part of the 1988 Nabisco Grand Prix. It was the 16th edition of the tournament and was held from 8 February through 14 February 1988. First-seeded Stefan Edberg successfully defended his 1987 singles title.

== Finals ==
=== Singles ===
(Sweden) Stefan Edberg defeated (Czechoslovakia) Miloslav Mečíř 7–6, 6–2

- It was Edberg's 1st title of the year and the 17th of his career.

=== Doubles ===
(West Germany) Patrik Kühnen / (West Germany) Tore Meinecke defeated (Sweden) Magnus Gustafsson / (Italy) Diego Nargiso 7–6, 7–6

- It was Kuhnen's first title of the year and the second of his career. For Meinecke it was also the first title of the year and the second of his career.
