= 1988 Campionati Internazionali della Valle D'Aosta =

- Date: 8–14 August
- Edition: 3rd
- Category: Grand Prix
- Draw: 32S / 16D
- Prize money: $125,000
- Surface: Clay / outdoor
- Location: Saint-Vincent, Aosta Valley Italy

Champions

Singles
- (Sweden) Kent Carlsson

Doubles
- (Argentina) Alberto Mancini / (Argentina) Christian Miniussi
- ATP Saint-Vincent

The 1988 Campionati Internazionali della Valle D'Aosta (International Championships of Valle d'Aosta), was a men's tennis tournament played on outdoor clay courts that was part of the 1988 Nabisco Grand Prix. It was the third edition of the tournament and took place in Saint-Vincent, Aosta Valley, Italy, from 8 August until 14 August 1988. First-seeded Kent Carlsson won the singles title.

== Finals ==
=== Singles ===
(Sweden) Kent Carlsson defeated (France) Thierry Champion, 6–0, 6–2

- It was Carlsson's 4th singles title of the year and the 8th of his career.

=== Doubles ===
(Argentina) Alberto Mancini / (Argentina) Christian Miniussi defeated (Italy) Paolo Canè / (Hungary) Balázs Taróczy, 6–4, 5–7, 6–3

- It was Mancini's only doubles title of the year and the 1st of his career. It was Miniussi's 2nd and last doubles title of the year and the 3rd of his career.
