= 1988 Queensland Open =

Tennis tournament

- Date: 3–9 October
- Edition: 86th
- Category: Grand Prix
- Draw: 32S / 16D
- Prize money: $165,000
- Surface: Hard / indoor
- Location: Brisbane, Australia
- Venue: Milton Courts

Champions

Singles
- (United States) Tim Mayotte

Doubles
- (West Germany) Eric Jelen / (West Germany) Carl-Uwe Steeb
← 1987 ·	Queensland Open	· 1989 →

The 1988 Queensland Open, also known by its sponsored name the Commonwealth Bank Queensland Open, was a men's tennis tournament played on indoor hard courts in Brisbane, Australia and was part of the 1988 Nabisco Grand Prix. It was the 86th edition of the tournament and was held from 3 October until 9 October 1988. First-seeded Tim Mayotte won the singles title.

== Finals ==
=== Singles ===
(United States) Tim Mayotte defeated (United States) Martin Davis 6–4, 6–4

- It was Mayotte's 3rd singles title of the year and the 10th of his career.

=== Doubles ===
(West Germany) Eric Jelen / (West Germany) Carl-Uwe Steeb defeated (Canada) Grant Connell / (Canada) Glenn Michibata 6–4 6–1

- It was Jelen's 2nd and last doubles title of the year and the 2nd of his career. It was Steeb's only doubles title of the year and the 1st of his career.
