= 1988 Queensland Open – Singles =

Singles
- 1988 Queensland Open

Final
- Champion: (United States) Tim Mayotte
- Runner-up: (United States) Martin Davis
- Score: 6–4, 6–4

Details
- Draw: 32 (3WC/4Q/1LL)
- Seeds: 8

Events
Singles	Doubles
← 1987 ·	Queensland Open	· 1989 →

Kelly Evernden was the defending champion, but lost in the first round to Eric Jelen.

Tim Mayotte won the title by defeating Martin Davis 6–4, 6–4 in the final.

== Seeds ==
1. (United States) Tim Mayotte (champion)
2. (Australia) Darren Cahill (first round)
3. (Australia) John Fitzgerald (second round)
4. (Socialist Federal Republic of Yugoslavia) Slobodan Živojinović (first round)
5. (Australia) John Frawley (second round)
6. (n/a)
7. (West Germany) Eric Jelen (second round)
8. (United States) Joey Rive (second round)

== Draw ==
=== Key ===
- Q = Qualifier
- WC = Wild card
- LL = Lucky loser
- Alt = Alternate
- SE = Special exempt
- PR = Protected ranking
- ITF = ITF entry
- JE = Junior exempt
- w/o = Walkover
- r = Retired
- d = Defaulted
- SR = Special ranking

=== Finals ===
Semifinals
1	(United States) Tim Mayotte	3	6	6
(Japan) Shuzo Matsuoka	6	1	1
(United States) Martin Davis	6	6
(Australia) Broderick Dyke	4	4

Final
1	(United States) Tim Mayotte	6	6
(United States) Martin Davis	4	4

=== Top half ===
First round
1	(United States) T Mayotte	2
(Australia) S Youl	3^{r}
(United States) R Matuszewski	6	6
WC	(Australia) T Woodbridge	4	2
Q	(Australia) D Tyson	3	3
(West Germany) CU Steeb	6	6
(New Zealand) K Evernden	4	4
7	(West Germany) E Jelen	6	6
4	(Socialist Federal Republic of Yugoslavia) S Živojinović	6	6
(Canada) G Michibata	7	7
(Japan) S Matsuoka	6	6
(Australia) P Doohan	4	4
Q	(Australia) M Kratzmann	4	0
(Australia) J Stoltenberg	6	6
(United States) T Nelson	6	6
LL	(Australia) R Rasheed	4	4

Second round
1	(United States) T Mayotte	6	6
(United States) R Matuszewski	3	0
(West Germany) CU Steeb	2	6	7
7	(West Germany) E Jelen	6	4	5
(Canada) G Michibata	4	7	6
(Japan) S Matsuoka	6	6	7
(Australia) J Stoltenberg	6	6
(United States) T Nelson	4	4

Quarterfinals
1	(United States) T Mayotte	6	6
(West Germany) CU Steeb	2	3
(Japan) S Matsuoka	6	6
(Australia) J Stoltenberg	3	4

Semifinals
1	(United States) T Mayotte	3	6	6
(Japan) S Matsuoka	6	1	1

=== Bottom half ===
First round
5	(Australia) J Frawley	7	7
(Australia) B Drewett	6	5
(Australia) R Fromberg	7	2	6
(Canada) G Connell	6	6	4
(Canada) C Pridham	1	4
(United States) M Davis	6	6
(Australia) J Anderson	5	6	4
3	(Australia) J Fitzgerald	7	2	6
8	(United States) J Rive	7	7
Q	(Australia) J Morgan	6	6
(United States) L Shiras	6	6
Q	(Australia) J Marinov	3	0
(Australia) B Dyke	6	4	6
WC	(Australia) L Warder	0	6	4
WC	(Australia) S Barr	6	6
2	(Australia) D Cahill	2	1

Second round
5	(Australia) J Frawley	3	3
(Australia) R Fromberg	6	6
(United States) M Davis	6	6
3	(Australia) J Fitzgerald	3	3
8	(United States) J Rive	4	7	2
(United States) L Shiras	6	5	6
(Australia) B Dyke	6	7
WC	(Australia) S Barr	1	5

Quarterfinals
(Australia) R Fromberg	6	1
(United States) M Davis	7	6
(United States) L Shiras	6	4	1
(Australia) B Dyke	1	6	6

Semifinals
(United States) M Davis	6	6
(Australia) B Dyke	4	4
