= 1988 U.S. Men's Clay Court Championships =

- Date: April 25 – May 1
- Edition: 20th
- Category: Grand Prix
- Draw: 32S / 16D
- Prize money: $190,000
- Surface: Clay / outdoor
- Location: Charleston, South Carolina, U.S.

Champions

Singles
- (United States) Andre Agassi

Doubles
- (South Africa) Pieter Aldrich / (South Africa) Danie Visser
← 1987 ·	U.S. Men's Clay Court Championships	· 1989 →

The 1988 U.S. Men's Clay Court Championships was a Grand Prix men's tennis tournament held in Charleston, South Carolina in the United States. It was the 20th edition of the tournament and was held on outdoor clay courts from April 25 through May 1, 1988. First-seeded Andre Agassi won the singles title.

== Finals ==
=== Singles ===
(United States) Andre Agassi defeated (United States) Jimmy Arias 6–2, 6–2

- It was Agassi's 2nd singles title of the year and the 3rd of his career.

=== Doubles ===
(South Africa) Pieter Aldrich / (South Africa) Danie Visser defeated (Mexico) Jorge Lozano / (United States) Todd Witsken 7–6, 6–3

- It was Aldrich's only title of the year and the 1st of his career. It was Visser's only title of the year and the 3rd of his career.
