= 1988 Queensland Open – Doubles =

Doubles
- 1988 Queensland Open

Final
- Champions: (West Germany) Eric Jelen (West Germany) Carl-Uwe Steeb
- Runners-up: (Canada) Grant Connell (Canada) Glenn Michibata
- Score: 6–4, 6–1

Details
- Draw: 16
- Seeds: 4

Events
Singles	Doubles
← 1987 ·	Queensland Open	· 1989 →

Matt Anger and Kelly Evernden were the defending champions, but Anger chose to compete at Scottsdale during the same week. Evernden teamed up with Slobodan Živojinović and lost in the first round to Peter Doohan and Laurie Warder.

Eric Jelen and Carl-Uwe Steeb won the title by defeating Grant Connell and Glenn Michibata 6–4, 6–1 in the final.

== Seeds ==
1. (Australia) Darren Cahill / (Australia) John Fitzgerald (quarterfinals)
2. (United States) Martin Davis / (Australia) Brad Drewett (semifinals)
3. (Canada) Grant Connell / (Canada) Glenn Michibata (final)
4. (Australia) Peter Doohan / (Australia) Laurie Warder (quarterfinals)

== Draw ==
=== Key ===
- Q = Qualifier
- WC = Wild card
- LL = Lucky loser
- Alt = Alternate
- SE = Special exempt
- PR = Protected ranking
- ITF = ITF entry
- JE = Junior exempt
- w/o = Walkover
- r = Retired
- d = Defaulted
- SR = Special ranking

=== Draw ===
First round
1	(Australia) D Cahill (Australia) J Fitzgerald	6	6
(United States) R Matuszewski (United States) T Nelson	4	4
(Australia) S Furlong (Australia) John Gibson	4	7	5
(United States) T Siegel (Australia) D Tyson	6	6	7
4	(Australia) P Doohan (Australia) L Warder	6	6	7
(New Zealand) K Evernden (Socialist Federal Republic of Yugoslavia) S Živojinović	4	7	6
(Australia) B Custer (Australia) D Macpherson	5	6	3
(West Germany) E Jelen (West Germany) CU Steeb	7	4	6
(Australia) S Barr (Australia) R Rasheed	7	6
(Australia) J Stoltenberg (Australia) T Woodbridge	6	4
(Australia) P Carter (Australia) S Youl	2	2
3	(Canada) G Connell (Canada) G Michibata	6	6
(Australia) J Frawley (Australia) G Pfitzner	6	3	4
(Australia) B Dyke (Australia) M Kratzmann	4	6	6
(United States) J Rive (United States) L Shiras	6	3	6
2	(United States) M Davis (Australia) B Drewett	4	6	7

Quarterfinals
1	(Australia) D Cahill (Australia) J Fitzgerald	6	6	6
(United States) T Siegel (Australia) D Tyson	7	4	7
4	(Australia) P Doohan (Australia) L Warder	6	3	3
(West Germany) E Jelen (West Germany) CU Steeb	4	6	6
(Australia) S Barr (Australia) R Rasheed	4	6
3	(Canada) G Connell (Canada) G Michibata	6	7
(Australia) B Dyke (Australia) M Kratzmann	2	6
2	(United States) M Davis (Australia) B Drewett	6	7

Semifinals
(United States) T Siegel (Australia) D Tyson	2	3
(West Germany) E Jelen (West Germany) CU Steeb	6	6
3	(Canada) G Connell (Canada) G Michibata	6	7	6
2	(United States) M Davis (Australia) B Drewett	7	6	4

Final
(West Germany) E Jelen (West Germany) CU Steeb	6	6
3	(Canada) G Connell (Canada) G Michibata	4	1
