= 1988 Newsweek Champions Cup =

- Date: February 29 – March 7
- Edition: 15th
- Draw: 56S / 28D
- Prize money: $510,000
- Surface: Hard / outdoor
- Location: Indian Wells, California, United States

Champions

Singles
- (West Germany) Boris Becker

Doubles
- (West Germany) Boris Becker / (France) Guy Forget
- Indian Wells Masters

The 1988 Newsweek Champions Cup was a men's tennis tournament played on outdoor hard courts. It was the 15th edition of the Indian Wells Masters and was part of the 1988 Nabisco Grand Prix. It was played at the Grand Champions Resort in Indian Wells, California in the United States from February 29 through March 7, 1988. Third-seeded Boris Becker won the singles title.

== Finals ==
=== Singles ===
(West Germany) Boris Becker defeated (Spain) Emilio Sánchez 7–5, 6–4, 2–6, 6–4

- It was Becker's 3rd title of the year and the 21st of his career.

=== Doubles ===
(West Germany) Boris Becker / (France) Guy Forget defeated (Mexico) Jorge Lozano / (United States) Todd Witsken 6–4, 6–4

- It was Becker's 2nd title of the year and the 20th of his career. It was Forget's 1st title of the year and the 15th of his career.
