= 1988 Rado Swiss Open =

- Date: 4–10 July
- Edition: 43rd
- Category: Grand Prix
- Draw: 32S / 16D
- Prize money: $240,000
- Surface: Clay / outdoor
- Location: Gstaad, Switzerland

Champions

Singles
- (Australia) Darren Cahill

Doubles
- (Czechoslovakia) Petr Korda / (Czechoslovakia) Milan Šrejber
- Suisse Open Gstaad

The 1988 Rado Swiss Open, also known as the Suisse Open Gstaad, was a men's tennis tournament held on outdoor clay courts in Gstaad, Switzerland that was part of the 1988 Nabisco Grand Prix. It was the 43rd edition of the tournament and was held from 4 July until 10 July 1988. Seventh-seeded Darren Cahill won the singles title.

== Finals ==
=== Singles ===
(Australia) Darren Cahill defeated (Switzerland) Jakob Hlasek 6–3, 6–4, 7–6^{(7–2)}

- It was Cahill's only singles title of the year and the 1st of his career.

=== Doubles ===
(Czechoslovakia) Petr Korda / (Czechoslovakia) Milan Šrejber defeated (Ecuador) Andrés Gómez / (Spain) Emilio Sánchez 7–6^{(7–5)}, 7–6^{(7–1)}

- It was Korda's first doubles title of his career. It was Šrejber's only doubles title of the year and the 1st of his career.
