= 1988 Stella Artois Italian Indoors =

- Date: 15–21 February
- Edition: 11th
- Category: Grand Prix (Super Series)
- Draw: 32S / 16D
- Prize money: $372,500
- Surface: Carpet / indoor
- Location: Milan, Italy
- Venue: Palazzo Trussardi

Champions

Singles
- (France) Yannick Noah

Doubles
- (West Germany) Boris Becker / (West Germany) Eric Jelen
- Milan Indoor

The 1988 Stella Artois Italian Indoors was a men's professional tennis tournament played on indoor carpet courts at the Palazzo Trussardi in Milan, Italy. The event was part of the Super Series tier of the 1988 Nabisco Grand Prix. It was the 11th edition of the tournament and was played from 15 February until 21 February 1988, moved up from its usual spot in March. Fifth-seeded Yannick Noah won the singles title after his opponent in the final, Jimmy Connors, had to retire with a pulled muscle.

== Finals ==
=== Singles ===
(France) Yannick Noah defeated (United States) Jimmy Connors 4–4 ret.

- It was Noah's 1st singles title of the year and the 22nd of his career.

=== Doubles ===
(West Germany) Boris Becker / (West Germany) Eric Jelen defeated (Czechoslovakia) Miloslav Mečíř / (Czechoslovakia) Tomáš Šmíd 6–3, 6–3
