= 1988 Newsweek Champions Cup – Doubles =

Doubles
- 1988 Newsweek Champions Cup

Final
- Champions: (West Germany) Boris Becker (France) Guy Forget
- Runners-up: (Mexico) Jorge Lozano (United States) Todd Witsken
- Score: 6–4, 6–4

Events
Singles	Doubles
← 1987 ·	Newsweek Champions Cup	· 1989 →

Guy Forget and Yannick Noah were the defending champions but only Forget competed that year with Boris Becker.

Becker and Forget won in the final 6–4, 6–4 against Jorge Lozano and Todd Witsken.

== Seeds ==
The top four seeded teams received byes into the second round.

1. (Czechoslovakia) Miloslav Mečíř / (Czechoslovakia) Tomáš Šmíd (semifinals)
2. (West Germany) Boris Becker / (France) Guy Forget (champions)
3. (United States) Gary Donnelly / (Spain) Emilio Sánchez (second round)
4. (United States) Kevin Curren / (United States) David Pate (semifinals)
5. (Australia) Laurie Warder / (United States) Blaine Willenborg (first round)
6. (Australia) John Fitzgerald / (South Africa) Christo van Rensburg (first round)
7. (United States) Rick Leach / (United States) Jim Pugh (first round)
8. (Australia) Pat Cash / (Sweden) Stefan Edberg (quarterfinals)

== Draw ==
=== Key ===
- Q = Qualifier
- WC = Wild card
- LL = Lucky loser
- Alt = Alternate
- SE = Special exempt
- PR = Protected ranking
- ITF = ITF entry
- JE = Junior exempt
- w/o = Walkover
- r = Retired
- d = Defaulted
- SR = Special ranking

=== Finals ===
Semifinals
1	(Czechoslovakia) Miloslav Mečíř (Czechoslovakia) Tomáš Šmíd	6	4
(Mexico) Jorge Lozano (United States) Todd Witsken	7	6
4	(United States) Kevin Curren (United States) David Pate	6	6	3
2	(West Germany) Boris Becker (France) Guy Forget	3	7	6

Final
(Mexico) Jorge Lozano (United States) Todd Witsken	4	4
2	(West Germany) Boris Becker (France) Guy Forget	6	6

=== Top half ===
First round
(Italy) D Nargiso (Argentina) R Saad	6	6
(South Africa) E Edwards (South Africa) G Muller	2	3
(United States) A Agassi (United States) J Arias	7	3	4
(Australia) D Cahill (Australia) M Kratzmann	5	6	6
(New Zealand) K Evernden (United States) J Kriek	3	6	6
7	(United States) R Leach (United States) J Pugh	6	3	4
(Mexico) J Lozano (United States) T Witsken	7	7
(Israel) A Mansdorf (United States) E Teltscher	6	5
(United States) A Kohlberg (United States) R Van't Hof	7	1	6
(Argentina) J Frana (Uruguay) D Pérez	6	6	4
(United States) J Grabb (United States) P McEnroe	5	6	7
5	(Australia) L Warder (United States) B Willenborg	7	1	6

Second round
1	(Czechoslovakia) M Mečíř (Czechoslovakia) T Šmíd	4	7	6
(Italy) D Nargiso (Argentina) R Saad	6	6	4
(Australia) D Cahill (Australia) M Kratzmann	3	3
(New Zealand) K Evernden (United States) J Kriek	6	6
3	(United States) G Donnelly (Spain) E Sánchez	2	6	1
(Mexico) J Lozano (United States) T Witsken	6	0	6
(United States) A Kohlberg (United States) R Van't Hof	6	7
(United States) J Grabb (United States) P McEnroe	1	6

Quarterfinals
1	(Czechoslovakia) M Mečíř (Czechoslovakia) T Šmíd	4	6	6
(New Zealand) K Evernden (United States) J Kriek	6	3	4
(Mexico) J Lozano (United States) T Witsken	3	6	6
(United States) A Kohlberg (United States) R Van't Hof	6	3	4

Semifinals
1	(Czechoslovakia) M Mečíř (Czechoslovakia) T Šmíd	6	4
(Mexico) J Lozano (United States) T Witsken	7	6

=== Bottom half ===
First round
6	(Australia) J Fitzgerald (South Africa) C van Rensburg	6	7	3
(United States) M Davis (Australia) B Drewett	7	6	6
(Australia) C Limberger (Australia) M Woodforde	1	4
(Australia) P Doohan (United States) T Wilkison	6	6
(Sweden) P Lundgren (Sweden) M Pernfors	6	6	6
(Paraguay) F González (Denmark) M Mortensen	3	7	4
8	(Australia) P Cash (Sweden) S Edberg	6	6	6
(United States) P Annacone (United States) S Stewart	7	3	4
(United States) P Chamberlin (United States) T Pawsat	7	6	4
(United States) E Korita (United States) B Pearce	6	7	6
(United States) E Amend (United States) S Melville	5	2
(United States) D Goldie (United States) K Jones	7	6

Second round
(United States) M Davis (Australia) B Drewett	6	6	6
(Australia) P Doohan (United States) T Wilkison	2	7	7
(Sweden) P Lundgren (Sweden) M Pernfors	1	6
4	(United States) K Curren (United States) D Pate	6	7
8	(Australia) P Cash (Sweden) S Edberg	7	6
(United States) E Korita (United States) B Pearce	6	2
(United States) D Goldie (United States) K Jones	3	1
2	(West Germany) B Becker (France) G Forget	6	6

Quarterfinals
(Australia) P Doohan (United States) T Wilkison	3	2
4	(United States) K Curren (United States) D Pate	6	6
8	(Australia) P Cash (Sweden) S Edberg
2	(West Germany) B Becker (France) G Forget	w/o

Semifinals
4	(United States) K Curren (United States) D Pate	6	6	3
2	(West Germany) B Becker (France) G Forget	3	7	6
