= 1988 Newsweek Champions Cup – Singles =

Singles
- 1988 Newsweek Champions Cup

Final
- Champion: (West Germany) Boris Becker
- Runner-up: (Spain) Emilio Sánchez
- Score: 7–5, 6–4, 2–6, 6–4

Events
Singles	Doubles
← 1987 ·	Newsweek Champions Cup	· 1989 →

Defending champion Boris Becker defeated Emilio Sánchez in the final, 7–5, 6–4, 2–6, 6–4 to win the singles title at the 1988 Newsweek Champions Cup.

== Seeds ==
The top eight seeds received a bye into the second round.

1. (Sweden) Stefan Edberg (third round)
2. (Czechoslovakia) Miloslav Mečíř (quarterfinals)
3. (West Germany) Boris Becker (champion)
4. (Australia) Pat Cash (semifinals)
5. (United States) Tim Mayotte (second round)
6. (Argentina) Martín Jaite (second round)
7. (United States) Andre Agassi (semifinals)
8. (Spain) Emilio Sánchez (final)
9. (United States) David Pate (third round)
10. (United States) Eliot Teltscher (second round)
11. (Israel) Amos Mansdorf (quarterfinals)
12. (Argentina) Eduardo Bengoechea (third round)
13. (South Africa) Christo van Rensburg (second round)
14. (Sweden) Peter Lundgren (first round)
15. (Sweden) Mikael Pernfors (quarterfinals)
16. (United States) Jimmy Arias (first round)

== Draw ==
=== Key ===
- Q = Qualifier
- WC = Wild card
- LL = Lucky loser
- Alt = Alternate
- SE = Special exempt
- PR = Protected ranking
- ITF = ITF entry
- JE = Junior exempt
- w/o = Walkover
- r = Retired
- d = Defaulted
- SR = Special ranking

=== Finals ===
Semifinals
7	(United States) Andre Agassi	6	3	5
3	(West Germany) Boris Becker	4	6	7
4	(Australia) Pat Cash	4	4
8	(Spain) Emilio Sánchez	6	6

Final
3	(West Germany) Boris Becker	7	6	2	6
8	(Spain) Emilio Sánchez	5	4	6	4

=== Top half ===
==== Section 1 ====
First round
(United States) J Grabb	2	3
(United States) J Brown	6	6
(Czechoslovakia) T Šmíd	6	6
(France) G Forget	3	4
(Austria) H Skoff	5	1
15	(Sweden) M Pernfors	7	6
9	(United States) D Pate	6	6	6
(Brazil) L Mattar	2	7	3
(South Africa) G Muller	6	6
SE	(Mexico) J Lozano	7	7
Q	(Socialist Federal Republic of Yugoslavia) B Orešar	6	6	7
WC	(South Africa) D Visser	7	4	6

Second round
1	(Sweden) S Edberg	6	6
(United States) J Brown	0	3
(Czechoslovakia) T Šmíd	5	3
15	(Sweden) M Pernfors	7	6
9	(United States) D Pate	7	6
SE	(Mexico) J Lozano	5	2
Q	(Socialist Federal Republic of Yugoslavia) B Orešar	1	1
7	(United States) A Agassi	6	6

Third round
1	(Sweden) S Edberg	6	3	2
15	(Sweden) M Pernfors	3	6	6
9	(United States) D Pate	3	3
7	(United States) A Agassi	6	6

Quarterfinals
15	(Sweden) M Pernfors	6	2	2
7	(United States) A Agassi	0	6	6

==== Section 2 ====
First round
(United States) T Wilkison	4	7	6
WC	(South Africa) E Edwards	6	6	3
(Australia) J Fitzgerald	0	7	6
WC	(United States) R Weiss	6	5	3
(Peru) J Yzaga	5	3
13	(South Africa) C van Rensburg	7	6
12	(Argentina) E Bengoechea	6	3	7
Q	(Argentina) J Frana	2	6	6
(Argentina) H de la Peña	3	6	6
(United States) J Pugh	6	2	3
(United States) J Kriek	6	6
(France) T Benhabiles	2	1

Second round
3	(West Germany) B Becker	6	6
(United States) T Wilkison	3	4
(Australia) J Fitzgerald	4	6	6
13	(South Africa) C van Rensburg	6	3	3
12	(Argentina) E Bengoechea	4	6	6
(Argentina) H de la Peña	6	1	2
(United States) J Kriek	6	6
5	(United States) T Mayotte	4	4

Third round
3	(West Germany) B Becker	6	6
(Australia) J Fitzgerald	0	2
12	(Argentina) E Bengoechea	2	4
(United States) J Kriek	6	6

Quarterfinals
3	(West Germany) B Becker	6	6
(United States) J Kriek	3	4

=== Bottom half ===
==== Section 3 ====
First round
(United States) D Goldie	3	6	6
(Argentina) G Vilas	6	1	4
Q	(South Africa) P Aldrich	6	2
(United States) D Rostagno	7	6
WC	(United States) M Chang	6	5	6
WC/11	(Israel) A Mansdorf	2	7	7
14	(Sweden) P Lundgren	6	3
(Australia) M Woodforde	7	6
(Australia) P Doohan	6	2	4
(Australia) J Frawley	2	6	6
(France) T Tulasne	6	6
(Czechoslovakia) B Stanković	1	3

Second round
6	(Argentina) M Jaite	6	5
(United States) D Goldie	7	7
(United States) D Rostagno	6	6
WC/11	(Israel) A Mansdorf	7	7
(Australia) M Woodforde	7	6
(Australia) J Frawley	5	4
(France) T Tulasne	3	4
4	(Australia) P Cash	6	6

Third round
(United States) D Goldie	6	3	6
WC/11	(Israel) A Mansdorf	4	6	7
(Australia) M Woodforde	3	2
4	(Australia) P Cash	6	6

Quarterfinals
WC/11	(Israel) A Mansdorf	1	6	5
4	(Australia) P Cash	6	3	7

==== Section 4 ====
First round
Q	(United States) T Witsken	3	6
Q	(Uruguay) D Pérez	6	7
Q	(United States) P Sampras	6	3	7
(India) R Krishnan	3	6	6
Q	(United States) J Canter	3	1
10	(United States) E Teltscher	6	6
16	(United States) J Arias	3	5
(United States) A Krickstein	6	7
(Czechoslovakia) M Vajda	6	0	4
(Australia) D Cahill	2	6	6
(New Zealand) K Evernden	1	3
(United States) R Reneberg	6	6

Second round
8	(Spain) E Sánchez	6	6
Q	(Uruguay) D Pérez	4	4
Q	(United States) P Sampras	7	6
10	(United States) E Teltscher	5	3
(United States) A Krickstein	4	4
(Australia) D Cahill	6	6
(United States) R Reneberg	1	3
2	(Czechoslovakia) M Mečíř	6	6

Third round
8	(Spain) E Sánchez	7	6
Q	(United States) P Sampras	5	2
(Australia) D Cahill	6	0	4
2	(Czechoslovakia) M Mečíř	2	6	6

Quarterfinals
8	(Spain) E Sánchez	2	6	6
2	(Czechoslovakia) M Mečíř	6	0	3
