= 1988 ABN World Tennis Tournament – Doubles =

Doubles
- 1988 ABN World Tennis Tournament

Final
- Champions: (West Germany) Patrik Kühnen (West Germany) Tore Meinecke
- Runners-up: (Sweden) Magnus Gustafsson (Italy) Diego Nargiso
- Score: 7–6, 7–6

Details
- Draw: 16
- Seeds: 4

Events
Singles	Doubles
- Rotterdam Open

Stefan Edberg and Anders Järryd were the defending champions, but Järryd did not compete this year. Edberg teamed up with Henri Leconte and reached the quarterfinal round until were forced to withdraw.

Patrik Kühnen and Tore Meinecke won the title by defeating Magnus Gustafsson and Diego Nargiso 7–6, 7–6 in the final.

== Seeds ==
1. (Spain) Sergio Casal / (Spain) Emilio Sánchez (first round)
2. (Czechoslovakia) Miloslav Mečíř / (Czechoslovakia) Tomáš Šmíd (first round)
3. (Czechoslovakia) Stanislav Birner / (Czechoslovakia) Jaroslav Navrátil (first round)
4. (Sweden) Jonas Svensson / (Sweden) Magnus Tideman (semifinals)

== Draw ==
Key

- Q = Qualifier
- WC = Wild card
- LL = Lucky loser
- Alt = Alternate
- ITF = ITF entry
- PR = Protected ranking
- SR = Special ranking
- SE = Special exempt
- JE = Junior exempt
- JR = Junior Accelerator Programme entrant
- CO = College Accelerator Programme entrant
- NG = Next Gen Accelerator Program entrant
- w/o = Walkover
- r = Retired
- d = Defaulted

=== Draw ===
First round
1	(Spain) S Casal (Spain) E Sánchez	6	3	4
(Czechoslovakia) J Čihák (Netherlands) T Nijssen	1	6	6
(Sweden) M Gustafsson (Italy) D Nargiso	7	4	7
(United States) D Goldie (United States) C Hooper	5	6	5
4	(Sweden) J Svensson (Sweden) M Tideman	6	6
(United States) B Buffington (United States) D Tarr	3	4
(Sweden) N Kroon (Czechoslovakia) B Stankovič	4	2
(Netherlands) M Oosting (West Germany) C Saceanu	6	6
(Poland) W Fibak (Netherlands) M Schapers	2	3
(Sweden) S Edberg (France) H Leconte	6	6
(Brazil) R Acioly (Brazil) C Motta	7	6
3	(Czechoslovakia) S Birner (Czechoslovakia) J Navrátil	5	3
(Spain) T Carbonell (Spain) J Sánchez	4	2
(West Germany) P Kühnen (West Germany) T Meinecke	6	6
(United States) P Chamberlin (United States) L Scott	7	7
2	(Czechoslovakia) M Mečíř (Czechoslovakia) T Šmíd	6	6

Quarterfinals
(Czechoslovakia) J Čihák (Netherlands) T Nijssen	0	7	0
(Sweden) M Gustafsson (Italy) D Nargiso	6	5	6
4	(Sweden) J Svensson (Sweden) M Tideman	6	6
(Netherlands) M Oosting (West Germany) C Saceanu	1	4
(Sweden) S Edberg (France) H Leconte
(Brazil) R Acioly (Brazil) C Motta	w/o
(West Germany) P Kühnen (West Germany) T Meinecke	3	6	6
(United States) P Chamberlin (United States) L Scott	6	3	4

Semifinals
(Sweden) M Gustafsson (Italy) D Nargiso	6	4	6
4	(Sweden) J Svensson (Sweden) M Tideman	3	6	3
(Brazil) R Acioly (Brazil) C Motta	3	2
(West Germany) P Kühnen (West Germany) T Meinecke	6	6

Final
(Sweden) M Gustafsson (Italy) D Nargiso	6	6
(West Germany) P Kühnen (West Germany) T Meinecke	7	7
