= 1988 U.S. Men's Clay Court Championships – Singles =

Singles
- 1988 U.S. Men's Clay Court Championships

Final
- Champion: (United States) Andre Agassi
- Runner-up: (United States) Jimmy Arias
- Score: 6–2, 6–2

Details
- Draw: 32
- Seeds: 8

Events
Singles	Doubles
- U.S. Men's Clay Court Championships

== Seeds ==
A champion seed is indicated in bold text while text in italics indicates the round in which that seed was eliminated.

1. (United States) **Andre Agassi (champion)**
2. (United States) Aaron Krickstein (quarterfinals)
3. (United States) David Pate (first round)
4. (United States) Jay Berger (quarterfinals, retired)
5. (United States) Johan Kriek (second round)
6. (Brazil) Luiz Mattar (first round)
7. (United States) Jimmy Arias (final)
8. (New Zealand) Kelly Evernden (first round)

== Draw ==
Key

- Q = Qualifier
- WC = Wild card
- LL = Lucky loser
- Alt = Alternate
- ITF = ITF entry
- PR = Protected ranking
- SR = Special ranking
- SE = Special exempt
- JE = Junior exempt
- JR = Junior Accelerator Programme entrant
- CO = College Accelerator Programme entrant
- NG = Next Gen Accelerator Program entrant
- w/o = Walkover
- r = Retired
- d = Defaulted

First round
1	(United States) **A Agassi**	**6**	**6**
(United States) J Brown	1	4
(Peru) **C di Laura**	**6**	**6**
Q	(United States) M Flur	4	1
(United States) **R Reneberg**	**6**	**6**
(Australia) S Youl	3	4
(United States) **M Davis**	6	**6**	**7**
8	(New Zealand) K Evernden	**7**	3	6
4	(United States) **J Berger**	**6**	**6**
(South Africa) G Muller	1	1
(United States) **S Giammalva Jr.**	**6**	6	**6**
WC	(United States) M Purcell	4	**7**	2
(United States) T Witsken	0	5
(United States) **L Duncan**	**6**	**7**
(United States) J Ross	2	**6**	4
5	(United States) **J Kriek**	**6**	2	**6**
6	(Brazil) L Mattar	2	2
(Czechoslovakia) **M Šrejber**	**6**	**6**
Q	(United States) M Chang	6	5
(Argentina) **H de la Peña**	**7**	**7**
(Mexico) J Lozano	**6**	3	1
WC	(United States) **J Courier**	3	**6**	**6**
Q	(Uruguay) **D Pérez**	**6**	**6**
3	(United States) D Pate	3	1
7	(United States) **J Arias**	**6**	**6**
(United States) D Cassidy	2	2
(Peru) **J Yzaga**	**7**	**6**
(United States) T Wilkison	5	4
Q	(United States) J Palmer	**6**	2	4
(Argentina) **C Miniussi**	4	**6**	**6**
WC	(United States) B Willenborg	3	3
2	(United States) **A Krickstein**	**6**	**6**

Second round
1	(United States) **A Agassi**	**6**	**6**
(Peru) C di Laura	2	2
(United States) **R Reneberg**	**6**	**6**
(United States) M Davis	1	4
4	(United States) **J Berger**	6	**7**	**6**
(United States) S Giammalva Jr.	**7**	5	0
(United States) **L Duncan**	**7**	**7**
5	(United States) J Kriek	6	6
(Czechoslovakia) M Šrejber	1	2
(Argentina) **H de la Peña**	**6**	**6**
WC	(United States) **J Courier**	**6**	**6**
Q	(Uruguay) D Pérez	1	2
7	(United States) **J Arias**	**7**	**6**
(Peru) J Yzaga	6	2
(Argentina) C Miniussi	1	0
2	(United States) **A Krickstein**	**6**	**6**

Quarterfinals
1	(United States) **A Agassi**	**6**	**6**
(United States) R Reneberg	1	3
4	(United States) J Berger	0	0^{r}
(United States) **L Duncan**	**6**	3
(Argentina) H de la Peña	3	6
WC	(United States) **J Courier**	**6**	**7**
7	(United States) **J Arias**	**6**	**6**
2	(United States) A Krickstein	0	2

Semifinals
1	(United States) **A Agassi**	2	**7**	**6**
(United States) L Duncan	**6**	5	4
WC	(United States) J Courier	2	**6**	2
7	(United States) **J Arias**	**6**	3	**6**

Final
1	(United States) **Andre Agassi**	**6**	**6**
7	(United States) Jimmy Arias	2	2
