= 1988 ABN World Tennis Tournament – Singles =

Singles
- 1988 ABN World Tennis Tournament

Final
- Champion: (Sweden) Stefan Edberg
- Runner-up: (Czechoslovakia) Miloslav Mečíř
- Score: 7–6, 6–2

Details
- Draw: 32
- Seeds: 8

Events
Singles	Doubles
- ABN World Tennis Tournament

Stefan Edberg was the reigning champion of the singles event at the ABN World Tennis Tournament and, seeded first, successfully defended his title after a 7–6, 6–2 win in the final against third-seeded Miloslav Mečíř.

== Seeds ==
A champion seed is indicated in bold text while text in italics indicates the round in which that seed was eliminated.

1. (Sweden) **Stefan Edberg (champion)**
2. (United States) Jimmy Connors (quarterfinals)
3. (Czechoslovakia) Miloslav Mečíř (final)
4. (Spain) Emilio Sánchez (first round)
5. (France) Henri Leconte (first round)
6. (Switzerland) Claudio Mezzadri (quarterfinals)
7. (Czechoslovakia) Tomáš Šmíd (first round)
8. (Sweden) Jonas Svensson (quarterfinals)

== Draw ==
Key

- Q = Qualifier
- WC = Wild card
- LL = Lucky loser
- Alt = Alternate
- ITF = ITF entry
- PR = Protected ranking
- SR = Special ranking
- SE = Special exempt
- JE = Junior exempt
- JR = Junior Accelerator Programme entrant
- CO = College Accelerator Programme entrant
- NG = Next Gen Accelerator Program entrant
- w/o = Walkover
- r = Retired
- d = Defaulted

First round
1	(Sweden) **Stefan Edberg**	**6**	**6**
Q	(Sweden) Fredrik Waern	4	4
Q	(Sweden) **Magnus Gustafsson**	**7**	**6**
(Sweden) Niclas Kroon	5	3
WC	(Poland) **Wojtek Fibak**	**7**	**6**
Q	(Belgium) Karel Demuynck	5	4
**(Czechoslovakia) Milan Šrejber**	**7**	**6**
7	(Czechoslovakia) Tomáš Šmíd	6	3
4	(Spain) Emilio Sánchez	2	4
(United States) **Dan Goldie**	**7**	**6**
**(Netherlands) Michiel Schapers**	2	**7**	**6**
WC	(United States) Chip Hooper	**6**	6	4
(Netherlands) Tom Nijssen	**6**	3	5
(West Germany) **Christian Saceanu**	1	**6**	**7**
Q	(Czechoslovakia) Stanislav Birner	3	3
5	(France) **Henri Leconte**	**6**	**6**
6	(Switzerland) **Claudio Mezzadri**	**6**	**6**
(Czechoslovakia) Karel Nováček	1	2
(Czechoslovakia) Josef Čihák	1	3
(West Germany) **Patrik Kühnen**	**6**	**6**
(Czechoslovakia) **Marián Vajda**	**6**	**6**
WC	(Netherlands) Menno Oosting	4	4
(Czechoslovakia) Branislav Stankovič	3	1
3	(Czechoslovakia) **Miloslav Mečíř**	**6**	**6**
8	(Sweden) Jonas Svensson	**6**	**6**
(Brazil) **Luiz Mattar**	4	2
Q	(United States) Paul Chamberlin	1	1
(Spain) **Sergio Casal**	**6**	**6**
**(Belgium) Libor Pimek**	**6**	**6**
(Australia) Darren Cahill	4	3
(Czechoslovakia) Jaroslav Navrátil	3	2
2	(United States) **Jimmy Connors**	**6**	**6**

Second round
1	(Sweden) **Stefan Edberg**	**6**	6	**6**
(Sweden) Magnus Gustafsson	2	**7**	3
(Australia) Wojtek Fibak	2	**6**	3
7	(Czechoslovakia) **Milan Šrejber**	**6**	4	**6**
(United States) Dan Goldie	3	4
(Netherlands) **Michiel Schapers**	**6**	**6**
(West Germany) Christian Saceanu	**6**	**6**
5	(France) **Henri Leconte**	4	2
(Switzerland) **Claudio Mezzadri**	**6**	**6**
(West Germany) Patrik Kühnen	1	0
(Czechoslovakia) Marián Vajda	2	6
3	(Czechoslovakia) **Miloslav Mečíř**	**6**	**7**
8	(Sweden) **Jonas Svensson**	**7**	**6**
(Spain) Sergio Casal	6	2
(Belgium) Libor Pimek	2	3
2	(United States) **Jimmy Connors**	**6**	**6**

Quarterfinals
1	(Sweden) **Stefan Edberg**	**6**	**6**
(Czechoslovakia) Milan Šrejber	4	4
(Netherlands) **Michiel Schapers**	**6**	4	**7**
(West Germany) Christian Saceanu	2	**6**	6
6	(Switzerland) Claudio Mezzadri	2	**6**	4
3	(Czechoslovakia) **Miloslav Mečíř**	**6**	4	**6**
8	(Sweden) **Jonas Svensson**	**6**	5	**7**
2	(United States) Jimmy Connors	3	**7**	6

Semifinals
1	(Sweden) **Stefan Edberg**	**6**	**6**
(Netherlands) Michiel Schapers	3	3
3	(Czechoslovakia) **Miloslav Mečíř**	**6**	**6**
8	(Sweden) Jonas Svenson	2	3

Final
1	(Sweden) **Stefan Edberg**	**7**	**6**
3	(Czechoslovakia) Miloslav Mečíř	6	2
