= 1988 in tennis =

This page covers the most important events in the sport of tennis in 1988. It provides the results of notable tournaments throughout the year on both the men's and women's tennis circuits, the Davis Cup, and the Federation Cup.

== ITF ==
=== Grand Slam tournaments ===
Category	Tournament	Champions	Finalists	Score
Men's singles	Australian Open	(Sweden) Mats Wilander	(Australia) Pat Cash	6–3, 6–7^{(3–7)}, 3–6, 6–1, 8–6
Men's singles	French Open	(Sweden) Mats Wilander	(France) Henri Leconte	7–5, 6–2, 6–1
Men's singles	Wimbledon	(Sweden) Stefan Edberg	(West Germany) Boris Becker	4–6, 7–6^{(7–2)}, 6–4, 6–2
Men's singles	US Open	(Sweden) Mats Wilander	(Czechoslovakia) Ivan Lendl	6–4, 4–6, 6–3, 5–7, 6–4

Category	Tournament	Champions	Finalists	Score
Women's singles	Australian Open	(Germany) Steffi Graf	(United States) Chris Evert	6–1, 7–6^{(7–3)}
Women's singles	French Open	(Germany) Steffi Graf	(Soviet Union) Natasha Zvereva	6–0, 6–0
Women's singles	Wimbledon	(Germany) Steffi Graf	(United States) Martina Navratilova	5–7, 6–2, 6–1
Women's singles	US Open	(Germany) Steffi Graf	(Argentina) Gabriela Sabatini	6–3, 3–6, 6–1

Category	Championship	Champions	Finalists	Score
Men's doubles	Australian Open	(United States) Rick Leach (United States) Jim Pugh	(United Kingdom) Jeremy Bates (Sweden) Peter Lundgren	6–3, 6–2, 6–3
Men's doubles	French Open	(Ecuador) Andrés Gómez (Spain) Emilio Sánchez	(Australia) John Fitzgerald (Sweden) Anders Järryd	6–3, 6–7, 6–4, 6–3
Men's doubles	Wimbledon	(United States) Ken Flach (United States) Robert Seguso	(Australia) John Fitzgerald (Sweden) Anders Järryd	6–4, 2–6, 6–4, 7–6^{(7–3)}
Men's doubles	US Open	(Spain) Sergio Casal (Spain) Emilio Sánchez	(United States) Rick Leach (United States) Jim Pugh	walkover

Category	Championship	Champions	Finalists	Score
Women's doubles	Australian Open	(United States) Martina Navratilova (United States) Pam Shriver	(United States) Chris Evert (Australia) Wendy Turnbull	6–0, 7–5
Women's doubles	French Open	(United States) Martina Navratilova (United States) Pam Shriver	(West Germany) Claudia Kohde-Kilsch (Czechoslovakia) Helena Suková	6–2, 7–5
Women's doubles	Wimbledon	(West Germany) Steffi Graf (Argentina) Gabriela Sabatini	(Soviet Union) Larisa Savchenko (Soviet Union) Natasha Zvereva	6–3, 1–6, 12–10
Women's doubles	US Open	(United States) Gigi Fernández (United States) Robin White	(United States) Patty Fendick (Canada) Jill Hetherington	6–4, 6–1

Category	Championship	Champions	Finalists	Score
Mixed doubles	Australian Open	(Czechoslovakia) Jana Novotná (United States) Jim Pugh	(United States) Martina Navratilova (United States) Tim Gullikson	5–7, 6–2, 6–4
Mixed doubles	French Open	(United States) Lori McNeil (Mexico) Jorge Lozano	(Netherlands) Brenda Schultz (Netherlands) Michiel Schapers	7–5, 6–2
Mixed doubles	Wimbledon	(United States) Zina Garrison (United States) Sherwood Stewart	(United States) Gretchen Magers (United States) Kelly Jones	6–1, 7–6^{(7–3)}
Mixed doubles	US Open	(Czechoslovakia) Jana Novotná (United States) Jim Pugh	(Australia) Elizabeth Smylie (United States) Patrick McEnroe	7–5, 6–3

== IOC ==
=== 1988 Summer Olympics ===
- 24 July – 1 August 2021: Summer Olympics

Category	Gold medalist	Silver medalist	Bronze medalists	Score in final
Men's singles	(Czechoslovakia) Miloslav Mečíř	(United States) Tim Mayotte	(Sweden) Stefan Edberg (United States) Brad Gilbert	3–6, 6–2, 6–4, 6–2
Women's singles	(West Germany) Steffi Graf	(Argentina) Gabriela Sabatini	(United States) Zina Garrison (Bulgaria) Manuela Maleeva	6–3, 6–3
Men's doubles	(United States) Ken Flach (United States) Robert Seguso	(Spain) Sergio Casal (Spain) Emilio Sánchez	(Czechoslovakia) Miloslav Mečíř (Czechoslovakia) Milan Šrejber (Sweden) Stefan Edberg (Sweden) Anders Järryd	6–3, 6–4, 6–7^{(5–7)}, 6–7^{(1–7)}, 9–7
Women's doubles	(United States) Zina Garrison (United States) Pam Shriver	(Czechoslovakia) Jana Novotná (Czechoslovakia) Helena Suková	(Australia) Elizabeth Smylie (Australia) Wendy Turnbull (West Germany) Steffi Graf (West Germany) Claudia Kohde-Kilsch	4–6, 6–2, 10–8

== Davis Cup ==
First round 5–7 February
Gävle, Sweden (indoor carpet)
Sweden	5
New Zealand	0
Prague, Czechoslovakia (indoor carpet)
Czechoslovakia	5
Paraguay	0
Mexico City, Mexico (clay)
Australia	3
Mexico	2
Basel, Switzerland (indoor carpet)
France	4
Switzerland	1
Essen, West Germany (indoor carpet)
Brazil	0
West Germany	5
Aarhus, Denmark (indoor carpet)
Denmark	3
Spain	2
Palermo, Italy (clay)
Italy	4
Israel	1
New Delhi, India (grass)
Yugoslavia	3
India	2

Quarterfinals; 8–10 April
Norrköping, Sweden (indoor carpet)
Sweden	3
Czechoslovakia	2
Clermont-Ferrand, France (indoor clay)
Australia	0
France	5
Frankfurt, West Germany (indoor carpet)
West Germany	5
Denmark	0
Belgrade, Yugoslavia (indoor carpet)
Italy	1
Yugoslavia	4

Semifinals; 22–24 July
Båstad, Sweden (clay)
Sweden	4
France	1
Dortmund, West Germany (indoor carpet)
West Germany	5
Yugoslavia	0

Final; 16–18 December
Gothenburg, Sweden (indoor clay)
Sweden	1
West Germany	4

== Federation Cup ==
First Round
West Germany	3
Mexico	0
Japan	0
France	3
Italy	2
Poland	1
Israel	0
Australia	3
Soviet Union	3
Yugoslavia	0
Belgium	1
Austria	2
Netherlands	0
Spain	3
Indonesia	2
Great Britain	1
Czechoslovakia	3
Brazil	0
Q	China	0
New Zealand	3
Denmark	3
Q	Luxembourg	0
Greece	0
Argentina	3
Canada	2
Q	South Korea	1
Finland	2
Hungary	1
Q	Bulgaria	0
Sweden	3
Switzerland	0
United States	3

Second Round
West Germany	3
France	0
Italy	0
Australia	3
Soviet Union	2
Austria	1
Spain	3
Indonesia	0
Czechoslovakia	3
New Zealand	0
Denmark	2
Argentina	1
Canada	3
Finland	0
Sweden	2
United States	1

Quarterfinals
West Germany	2
Australia	1
Soviet Union	2
Spain	1
Czechoslovakia	3
Denmark	0
Canada	3
Sweden	0

Semifinals
West Germany	1
Soviet Union	2
Czechoslovakia	3
Canada	0

Final
Soviet Union	1
Czechoslovakia	2

Consolation first round
Philippines	1
Ireland	2
Bulgaria	2
Malta	1
Luxembourg	1
South Korea	2
China	0
Chinese Taipei	3

Consolation second round
Brazil	3
Hungary	0
Poland	0
Israel	3
Yugoslavia	2
Ireland	1
Netherlands	2
Bulgaria	0
South Korea	2
Japan	1
Greece	0
Belgium	3
Chinese Taipei	2
Mexico	1
Switzerland	1
Great Britain	2

Consolation quarterfinals
Brazil	3
Israel	0
Yugoslavia	0
Netherlands	3
South Korea	1
Belgium	2
Chinese Taipei	0
Great Britain	3

Consolation semifinals
Brazil	0
Netherlands	3
Belgium	1
Great Britain	2

Consolation final
Netherlands	2
Great Britain	1

== Exhibitions ==
ADELAIDE - Rio International
January 7–10, 1988
Surface: Hard
Prize Money:
Semi-final	Semi-final
Stefan Edberg - Anders Järryd 7–6, 6–3	Pat Cash - Johan Kriek 4–6, 7–6, 6–4
Final
Pat Cash - Stefan Edberg 7–6, 7–6

GOLD COAST, Australia
January 7–10, 1988
Surface: Hard
Prize Money:
Quarter-finals	Quarter-finals
Kelly Evernden - Slobodan Živojinović 6–3, 4–6, 6–4	Wally Masur - Paul Annacone 7–5, 4–6, 6–3
Semi-finals
Ivan Lendl - Kelly Evernden 6–0, 7–5	Wally Masur - Yannick Noah 7–6, 6–7, 6–1
Final
Ivan Lendl - Wally Masur 6–7, 7–6, 6–4

PORTLAND
January 25, 1988
Surface: Carpet
Challenge match
Andrei Chesnokov - John McEnroe 6–3, 6–4

OSAKA, Japan
January 28, 1988
Surface: Carpet
Challenge match
Boris Becker - Ivan Lendl 6–3, 1–6, 6–2

HOMBURG, West Germany
January 28, 1988
Surface: Carpet
Challenge match	Challenge match
Henri Leconte - Tomáš Šmíd 6–2, 6–4	Eric Jelen - Wojciech Fibak 6–7, 6–0, 6–3

PREROV, Czechoslovakia
January 29–30, 1988
Surface: Carpet
Challenge matches	Challenge matches
Karel Nováček - Bernhard Pils 6–0, 6–3	Petr Korda - Thomas Muster 6–7, 7–6, 6–3
Karel Nováček - Thomas Muster 6–3, 7–5	Petr Korda - Bernhard Pils 6–3, 6–2

SINDELFINGEN, West Germany
January 29–31, 1988
Surface: Carpet
Challenge match	Challenge match
Stefan Edberg - Miloslav Mečíř 6–2, 6–3	Anders Järryd - Tomáš Šmíd 6–0, 6–1

FRANKFURT, West Germany
January 31, 1988
Surface: Carpet
Challenge match
Ivan Lendl - Boris Becker 6–4, 7–5

ATLANTA - AT&T Challenge of Champions
April 28–May 1, 1988
Surface: Clay (Har-Tru)
Prize Money: $500,000
Round Robin 1	Round Robin 2
John McEnroe - Jimmy Connors 7–5, 6–1	Ivan Lendl - Mikael Pernfors 6–3, 6–3
Stefan Edberg - Slobodan Živojinović 3–6, 6–3, 6–2	Andrés Gómez - Amos Mansdorf 6–1, 1–6, 6–4
Stefan Edberg - Jimmy Connors 6–4, 6–3	Ivan Lendl - Andrés Gómez 6–4, 6–3
Slobodan Živojinović - John McEnroe 6–4, 6–3	Mikael Pernfors - Amos Mansdorf
John McEnroe - Stefan Edberg 6–1, 6–4	Ivan Lendl - Amos Mansdorf
Jimmy Connors - Slobodan Živojinović	Andrés Gómez - Mikael Pernfors
Semi-finals
Stefan Edberg - John McEnroe 6–3, 3–6, 6–3	Ivan Lendl - Andrés Gómez 6–2, 6–2
Final
Ivan Lendl - Stefan Edberg 2–6, 6–1, 6–3
