= 1988 U.S. Men's Clay Court Championships – Doubles =

Doubles
- 1988 U.S. Men's Clay Court Championships

Final
- Champions: (South Africa) Pieter Aldrich (South Africa) Danie Visser
- Runners-up: (Mexico) Jorge Lozano (United States) Todd Witsken
- Score: 7–6^{(7–3)}, 6–3

Details
- Draw: 16
- Seeds: 4

Events
Singles	Doubles
- U.S. Men's Clay Court Championships

Pieter Aldrich and Danie Visser won in the final 7–6, 6–3 against Jorge Lozano and Todd Witsken.

== Seeds ==
Champion seeds are indicated in bold text while text in italics indicates the round in which those seeds were eliminated.

1. (New Zealand) Kelly Evernden / (United States) Johan Kriek (semifinals)
2. (Mexico) Jorge Lozano / (United States) Todd Witsken (final)
3. (United States) Tim Wilkison / (United States) Blaine Willenborg (first round)
4. (United States) Steve Denton / (United States) Sammy Giammalva Jr. (first round)

== Draw ==
Key

- Q = Qualifier
- WC = Wild card
- LL = Lucky loser
- Alt = Alternate
- ITF = ITF entry
- PR = Protected ranking
- SR = Special ranking
- SE = Special exempt
- JE = Junior exempt
- JR = Junior Accelerator Programme entrant
- CO = College Accelerator Programme entrant
- NG = Next Gen Accelerator Program entrant
- w/o = Walkover
- r = Retired
- d = Defaulted

First round
1	**(New Zealand) Kelly Evernden** **(United States) Johan Kriek**	3	**7**	**6**
(Peru) Carlos di Laura (United States) John Ross	**6**	5	1
(United States) Rill Baxter (United States) Mike De Palmer	**6**	1	4
**(United States) Jimmy Arias** **(United States) Andre Agassi**	3	**6**	**6**
4	(United States) Steve Denton (United States) S Giammalva Jr.	3	4
**(United States) Dan Cassidy** **(United States) Mel Purcell**	**6**	**6**
**(South Africa) Pieter Aldrich** **(South Africa) Danie Visser**	**7**	**6**
(United States) Martin Davis (United States) Richey Reneberg	6	4
(Paraguay) Francisco González (United States) Larry Scott	4	4
**(Australia) D Macpherson** **(Australia) Simon Youl**	**6**	**6**
**(South Africa) Eddie Edwards** **(South Africa) Gary Muller**	**6**	4	**6**
3	(United States) Tim Wilkison (United States) Blaine Willenborg	4	**6**	3
(Nigeria) Tony Mmoh (Czechoslovakia) Milan Šrejber	4	3
**(United States) Bud Cox** **(United States) Marc Flur**	**6**	**6**
(Brazil) Luiz Mattar (Uruguay) Diego Pérez	**6**	3	0
2	**(Mexico) Jorge Lozano** **(United States) Todd Witsken**	4	**6**	**6**

Quarterfinals
1	**(New Zealand) Kelly Evernden** **(United States) Johan Kriek**	5	**6**	**7**
(United States) Jimmy Arias (United States) Andre Agassi	**7**	2	5
4	(United States) Dan Cassidy (United States) Mel Purcell	**6**	4	2
**(South Africa) Pieter Aldrich** **(South Africa) Danie Visser**	0	**6**	**6**
(Australia) David Macpherson (Australia) Simon Youl	6	4
**(South Africa) Eddie Edwards** **(South Africa) Gary Muller**	**7**	**6**
(United States) Bud Cox (United States) Marc Flur	1	5
2	**(Mexico) Jorge Lozano** **(United States) Todd Witsken**	**6**	**7**

Semifinals
1	(New Zealand) Kelly Evernden (United States) Johan Kriek	**7**	4	6
**(South Africa) Pieter Aldrich** **(South Africa) Danie Visser**	6	**6**	**7**
(South Africa) Eddie Edwards (South Africa) Gary Muller	3	5
2	**(Mexico) Jorge Lozano** **(United States) Todd Witsken**	**6**	**7**

Final
**(South Africa) Pieter Aldrich** **(South Africa) Danie Visser**	**7**	**6**
2	(Mexico) Jorge Lozano (United States) Todd Witsken	6	3
