= 1989 Queensland Open =

Tennis tournament

- Date: 2–8 October
- Edition: 87th
- Category: Grand Prix
- Draw: 32S / 16D
- Prize money: $150,000
- Surface: Hard / outdoor
- Location: Brisbane, Australia
- Venue: Milton Courts

Champions

Singles
- (Sweden) Niclas Kroon

Doubles
- (Australia) Darren Cahill / (Australia) Mark Kratzmann
| ← 1988 · | Queensland Open | · 1990 → |

The 1989 Queensland Open, also known by its sponsored name the Commonwealth Bank Queensland Open, was a men's tennis tournament played on outdoor hard courts at the Milton Courts in Brisbane, Australia and was part of the 1989 Nabisco Grand Prix. It was the 87th edition of the tournament and was held from 2 October until 8 October 1989. Unseeded Niclas Kroon won the singles title.

== Finals ==
=== Singles ===
(Sweden) Niclas Kroon defeated (Australia) Mark Woodforde 4–6, 6–2, 6–4

- It was Kroon's only singles title of his career.

=== Doubles ===
(Australia) Darren Cahill / (Australia) Mark Kratzmann defeated (Australia) Broderick Dyke / (Australia) Simon Youl 6–4, 5–7, 6–0

- It was Cahill's 4th and last doubles title of the year and the 9th of his career. It was Kratzmann's 3rd and last doubles title of the year and the 8th of his career.
