= 1986 ATP Challenger Series =

Details
- Duration: 20 January 1986 – 7 December 1986
- Edition: 9th
- Tournaments: 54

Achievements (singles)

The ATP Challenger Series is the second-tier tour for professional tennis organised by the Association of Tennis Professionals (ATP). The 1986 ATP Challenger Series calendar comprises 54 tournaments, with prize money ranging from $25,000 up to $75,000.

== Schedule ==
=== January ===
Week of	Tournament	Champions	Runners-up	Semifinalists	Quarterfinalists
January 6	No tournaments scheduled.				
January 13	No tournaments scheduled.				
January 20	Guarujá Challenger; Guarujá, Brazil $75,000 – clay – 32S/16D; Singles draw – Doubles draw	(Brazil) Cássio Motta; 6–1, 1–6, 6–1	(Brazil) Carlos Kirmayr	(Brazil) Nelson Aerts (Mexico) Francisco Maciel	(Spain) Juan Avendaño (Brazil) Luiz Mattar (Sweden) Ronnie Båthman (Argentina) Eduardo Masso
January 20	Guarujá Challenger; Guarujá, Brazil $75,000 – clay – 32S/16D; Singles draw – Doubles draw	(Brazil) Carlos Kirmayr (Brazil) Cássio Motta; 6–3, 6–2	(Argentina) Alejandro Ganzábal (Ecuador) Raúl Viver	(Brazil) Nelson Aerts (Mexico) Francisco Maciel	(Spain) Juan Avendaño (Brazil) Luiz Mattar (Sweden) Ronnie Båthman (Argentina) Eduardo Masso
January 27	Viña del Mar Challenger; Viña del Mar, Chile $25,000 – clay – 32S/16D; Singles draw – Doubles draw	(Chile) Hans Gildemeister; 6–1, 6–0	(United States) Lawson Duncan	(Chile) Gerardo Vacarezza (Peru) Pablo Arraya	(Argentina) Gustavo Guerrero (Spain) Juan Avendaño (Argentina) Alejandro Ganzábal (West Germany) Alex Stepanek
January 27	Viña del Mar Challenger; Viña del Mar, Chile $25,000 – clay – 32S/16D; Singles draw – Doubles draw	(Argentina) Gustavo Luza (Argentina) Gustavo Tiberti; 6–1, 6–2	(South Africa) Craig Campbell (Peru) Carlos di Laura	(Chile) Gerardo Vacarezza (Peru) Pablo Arraya	(Argentina) Gustavo Guerrero (Spain) Juan Avendaño (Argentina) Alejandro Ganzábal (West Germany) Alex Stepanek

=== February ===
Week of	Tournament	Champions	Runners-up	Semifinalists	Quarterfinalists
February 3	Nairobi Challenger; Nairobi, Kenya $25,000 – clay – 32S/16D; Singles draw – Doubles draw	(West Germany) Peter Elter; 6–2, 7–6	(United States) Marcel Freeman	(West Germany) Peter Moraing (United Kingdom) Nick Fulwood	(Nigeria) David Imonitie (Nigeria) Sadiq Abdullahi (France) Paul Torre (West Germany) Christian Geyer
February 3	Nairobi Challenger; Nairobi, Kenya $25,000 – clay – 32S/16D; Singles draw – Doubles draw	(United Kingdom) David Felgate (United Kingdom) Nick Fulwood; 6–2, 7–6	(United States) Marcel Freeman (United States) Jacques Manset	(West Germany) Peter Moraing (United Kingdom) Nick Fulwood	(Nigeria) David Imonitie (Nigeria) Sadiq Abdullahi (France) Paul Torre (West Germany) Christian Geyer
February 10	Benin City-1 Challenger; Benin City, Nigeria $50,000 – hard – 32S/16D; Singles draw – Doubles draw	(Finland) Olli Rahnasto; 7–6, 6–7, 6–3	(Nigeria) Nduka Odizor	(Czechoslovakia) Stanislav Birner (Austria) Hans-Peter Kandler	(France) Thierry Champion (West Germany) Harald Theissen (United States) Charles Strode (United States) David Dowlen
February 10	Benin City-1 Challenger; Benin City, Nigeria $50,000 – hard – 32S/16D; Singles draw – Doubles draw	(United States) Rick Rudeen (United States) Todd Witsken; 7–6, 6–3	(Spain) José Clavet (Spain) Juan Antonio Rodríguez	(Czechoslovakia) Stanislav Birner (Austria) Hans-Peter Kandler	(France) Thierry Champion (West Germany) Harald Theissen (United States) Charles Strode (United States) David Dowlen
February 17	Enugu Challenger; Enugu, Nigeria $25,000 – hard – 32S/16D; Singles draw – Doubles draw	(United States) Marcel Freeman; 3–6, 7–5, 6–0	(Nigeria) Tony Mmoh	(Nigeria) Nduka Odizor (Finland) Leo Palin	(Switzerland) Stephan Medem (Nigeria) David Imonitie (France) Thierry Champion (Italy) Alessandro de Minicis
February 17	Enugu Challenger; Enugu, Nigeria $25,000 – hard – 32S/16D; Singles draw – Doubles draw	(Czechoslovakia) Stanislav Birner (United States) Charles Strode; 6–4, 7–6	(United States) Brett Buffington (United States) Ted Erck	(Nigeria) Nduka Odizor (Finland) Leo Palin	(Switzerland) Stephan Medem (Nigeria) David Imonitie (France) Thierry Champion (Italy) Alessandro de Minicis
February 24	Lagos Open; Lagos, Nigeria $75,000 – hard– 32S/16D; Singles draw – Doubles draw	(Nigeria) Nduka Odizor; 6–2, 6–3	(United States) Marcel Freeman	(France) Jean-Philippe Fleurian (United States) Todd Witsken	(Austria) Alex Antonitsch (Italy) Alessandro de Minicis (Spain) José Clavet (Czechoslovakia) Stanislav Birner
February 24	Lagos Open; Lagos, Nigeria $75,000 – hard– 32S/16D; Singles draw – Doubles draw	(Finland) Olli Rahnasto (Finland) Leo Palin; 4–6, 7–6, 6–4	(United States) Lloyd Bourne (United States) Brett Dickinson	(France) Jean-Philippe Fleurian (United States) Todd Witsken	(Austria) Alex Antonitsch (Italy) Alessandro de Minicis (Spain) José Clavet (Czechoslovakia) Stanislav Birner

=== March ===
Week of	Tournament	Champions	Runners-up	Semifinalists	Quarterfinalists
March 3	Ogun Challenger; Ogun, Nigeria $25,000 – hard – 32S/16D; Singles draw – Doubles draw	(Czechoslovakia) Stanislav Birner; 7–6, 6–4	(Australia) Anthony Lane	(United States) Todd Witsken (United States) Rick Rudeen	(United States) Val Wilder (France) Jean-Philippe Fleurian (Netherlands) Menno Oosting (West Germany) Harald Theissen
March 3	Ogun Challenger; Ogun, Nigeria $25,000 – hard – 32S/16D; Singles draw – Doubles draw	(Nigeria) Tony Mmoh (Switzerland) Jarek Srnensky; 6–7, 6–0, 7–5	(France) Jean-Philippe Fleurian (United States) Todd Witsken	(United States) Todd Witsken (United States) Rick Rudeen	(United States) Val Wilder (France) Jean-Philippe Fleurian (Netherlands) Menno Oosting (West Germany) Harald Theissen
March 3	Vienna Challenger; Vienna, Austria $25,000 – carpet (I) – 32S/16D; Singles draw – Doubles draw	(United States) Gary Donnelly; 6–2, 7–6	(Czechoslovakia) Karel Nováček	(Australia) Broderick Dyke (Austria) Horst Skoff	(Sweden) Jörgen Windahl (Egypt) Ahmed El-Mehelmy (Czechoslovakia) Jaroslav Navrátil (West Germany) Jaromir Becka
March 3	Vienna Challenger; Vienna, Austria $25,000 – carpet (I) – 32S/16D; Singles draw – Doubles draw	(Czechoslovakia) Karel Nováček (Czechoslovakia) Richard Vogel; 6–4, 6–4	(Netherlands) Jan-Willem Lodder (South Africa) Denys Maasdorp	(Australia) Broderick Dyke (Austria) Horst Skoff	(Sweden) Jörgen Windahl (Egypt) Ahmed El-Mehelmy (Czechoslovakia) Jaroslav Navrátil (West Germany) Jaromir Becka
March 10	Rio de Janeiro Open; Rio de Janeiro, Brazil $25,000 – clay – 32S/16D; Singles draw – Doubles draw	(Brazil) Luiz Mattar; 6–7, 6–4, 6–3	(Argentina) Alejandro Ganzábal	(Argentina) Guillermo Rivas (Brazil) Cássio Motta	(South Africa) Craig Campbell (Brazil) Fernando Roese (Brazil) Marcelo Hennemann (Brazil) José Daher
March 10	Rio de Janeiro Open; Rio de Janeiro, Brazil $25,000 – clay – 32S/16D; Singles draw – Doubles draw	(Brazil) Carlos Kirmayr (Brazil) Cássio Motta; 7–5, 6–4	(Brazil) Givaldo Barbosa (Brazil) Edvaldo Oliveira	(Argentina) Guillermo Rivas (Brazil) Cássio Motta	(South Africa) Craig Campbell (Brazil) Fernando Roese (Brazil) Marcelo Hennemann (Brazil) José Daher
March 17	Brasília Challenger; Brasília, Brazil $25,000 – clay – 32S/16D; Singles draw – Doubles draw	(Chile) Pedro Rebolledo; 6–2, 6–2	(Sweden) Ronnie Båthman	(United States) Jim Pugh (Brazil) Edvaldo Oliveira	(Italy) Claudio Pistolesi (Peru) Carlos di Laura (Argentina) Gustavo Guerrero (Argentina) Gustavo Luza
March 17	Brasília Challenger; Brasília, Brazil $25,000 – clay – 32S/16D; Singles draw – Doubles draw	(Sweden) Ronnie Båthman (Sweden) Stefan Svensson; 6–4, 6–1	(Argentina) Gustavo Luza (Argentina) Gustavo Tiberti	(United States) Jim Pugh (Brazil) Edvaldo Oliveira	(Italy) Claudio Pistolesi (Peru) Carlos di Laura (Argentina) Gustavo Guerrero (Argentina) Gustavo Luza
March 24	Marrakech Challenger; Marrakesh, Morocco $50,000 – clay – 32S/16D; Singles draw – Doubles draw	(Spain) David de Miguel; 6–2, 6–3	(France) Thierry Champion	(Sweden) Ulf Stenlund (Haiti) Ronald Agénor	(Sweden) Stefan Simonsson (Paraguay) Víctor Pecci (Spain) Juan Antonio Rodríguez (Spain) Jesus Colas
March 24	Marrakech Challenger; Marrakesh, Morocco $50,000 – clay – 32S/16D; Singles draw – Doubles draw	(Italy) Paolo Canè (Switzerland) Claudio Mezzadri; 0–6, 6–1, 6–4	(Spain) Jordi Arrese (Spain) Jorge Bardou	(Sweden) Ulf Stenlund (Haiti) Ronald Agénor	(Sweden) Stefan Simonsson (Paraguay) Víctor Pecci (Spain) Juan Antonio Rodríguez (Spain) Jesus Colas
March 24	Porto Alegre Challenger; Porto Alegre, Brazil $25,000 – clay – 32S/16D; Singles draw – Doubles draw	(Peru) Carlos di Laura; 1–6, 7–6, 6–3	(United States) Blaine Willenborg	(Argentina) Eduardo Bengoechea (Brazil) Júlio Góes	(Brazil) Luiz Mattar (South Africa) Craig Campbell (Argentina) Guillermo Rivas (Brazil) Dácio Campos
March 24	Porto Alegre Challenger; Porto Alegre, Brazil $25,000 – clay – 32S/16D; Singles draw – Doubles draw	(Argentina) Gustavo Luza (Argentina) Gustavo Tiberti; 6–3, 6–3	(Brazil) Júlio Góes (Brazil) Ney Keller	(Argentina) Eduardo Bengoechea (Brazil) Júlio Góes	(Brazil) Luiz Mattar (South Africa) Craig Campbell (Argentina) Guillermo Rivas (Brazil) Dácio Campos
March 24	San Luis Potosí Challenger; San Luis Potosí, Mexico $25,000 – clay – 32S/16D; Singles draw – Doubles draw	(United States) Derrick Rostagno; 6–4, 6–1	(United States) Bud Cox	(Mexico) Jorge Lozano (United States) Jon Levine	(United States) Marcel Freeman (United States) Karl Richter (Venezuela) Iñaki Calvo (Mexico) Eduardo Vélez
March 24	San Luis Potosí Challenger; San Luis Potosí, Mexico $25,000 – clay – 32S/16D; Singles draw – Doubles draw	(United States) Bud Cox (United States) Jon Levine; 7–6, 4–6, 6–4	(Canada) Stéphane Bonneau (Venezuela) Iñaki Calvo	(Mexico) Jorge Lozano (United States) Jon Levine	(United States) Marcel Freeman (United States) Karl Richter (Venezuela) Iñaki Calvo (Mexico) Eduardo Vélez
March 31	Agadir Challenger; Agadir, Morocco $50,000 – clay – 32S/16D; Singles draw – Doubles draw	(Spain) Fernando Luna; 6–1, 7–5	(Spain) Jesus Colas	(West Germany) Tore Meinecke (Australia) John Frawley	(Spain) José López-Maeso (Australia) Peter McNamara (Paraguay) Víctor Pecci (West Germany) Carl-Uwe Steeb
March 31	Agadir Challenger; Agadir, Morocco $50,000 – clay – 32S/16D; Singles draw – Doubles draw	(Spain) Jordi Arrese (Spain) Jorge Bardou; 2–6, 6–4, 7–5	(Spain) Jesus Colas (Spain) David de Miguel	(West Germany) Tore Meinecke (Australia) John Frawley	(Spain) José López-Maeso (Australia) Peter McNamara (Paraguay) Víctor Pecci (West Germany) Carl-Uwe Steeb
March 31	São Paulo-1 Challenger; São Paulo, Brazil $25,000 – clay – 32S/16D; Singles draw – Doubles draw	(Brazil) Ivan Kley; 6–4, 6–3	(Argentina) Alejandro Ganzábal	(Brazil) Carlos Kirmayr (Brazil) Cássio Motta	(Brazil) José Daher (United States) Blaine Willenborg (United States) Jim Pugh (Argentina) Gustavo Guerrero
March 31	São Paulo-1 Challenger; São Paulo, Brazil $25,000 – clay – 32S/16D; Singles draw – Doubles draw	(Brazil) Carlos Kirmayr (Brazil) Luiz Mattar; 4–6, 6–1, 7–5	(Sweden) Ronnie Båthman (Brazil) Dácio Campos	(Brazil) Carlos Kirmayr (Brazil) Cássio Motta	(Brazil) José Daher (United States) Blaine Willenborg (United States) Jim Pugh (Argentina) Gustavo Guerrero

=== April ===
Week of	Tournament	Champions	Runners-up	Semifinalists	Quarterfinalists
April 7	Jerusalem Challenger; Jerusalem, Israel $25,000 – hard – 32S/16D; Singles draw – Doubles draw	(Israel) Amos Mansdorf; 1–6, 7–6, 6–2	(Australia) Wally Masur	(South Africa) Gary Muller (United Kingdom) Nick Fulwood	(Switzerland) Stephan Medem (West Germany) Carl-Uwe Steeb (Israel) Shahar Perkiss (South Africa) Brian Levine
April 7	Jerusalem Challenger; Jerusalem, Israel $25,000 – hard – 32S/16D; Singles draw – Doubles draw	(South Africa) Brian Levine (South Africa) Gary Muller; 6–3, 6–4	(Finland) Leo Palin (Finland) Olli Rahnasto	(South Africa) Gary Muller (United Kingdom) Nick Fulwood	(Switzerland) Stephan Medem (West Germany) Carl-Uwe Steeb (Israel) Shahar Perkiss (South Africa) Brian Levine
April 7	Lisbon Challenger; Lisbon, Portugal $25,000 – clay – 32S/16D; Singles draw – Doubles draw	(Socialist Federal Republic of Yugoslavia) Marko Ostoja; 6–2, 2–6, 6–2	(Australia) John Frawley	(Spain) Juan Avendaño (Sweden) Jörgen Windahl	(Switzerland) Claudio Mezzadri (France) Éric Winogradsky (Netherlands) Jan-Willem Lodder (Sweden) Magnus Tideman
April 7	Lisbon Challenger; Lisbon, Portugal $25,000 – clay – 32S/16D; Singles draw – Doubles draw	(New Zealand) Bruce Derlin (United Kingdom) David Felgate; 5–7, 6–3, 6–4	(Italy) Alessandro de Minicis (Socialist Federal Republic of Yugoslavia) Marko Ostoja	(Spain) Juan Avendaño (Sweden) Jörgen Windahl	(Switzerland) Claudio Mezzadri (France) Éric Winogradsky (Netherlands) Jan-Willem Lodder (Sweden) Magnus Tideman
April 14	Parioli Challenger; Rome, Italy $25,000 – clay – 32S/16D; Singles draw – Doubles draw	(Italy) Simone Colombo; 6–4, 6–2	(Sweden) Jörgen Windahl	(France) Éric Winogradsky (Italy) Paolo Canè	(Sweden) Christian Bergström (Italy) Massimiliano Narducci (Argentina) Franco Davín (Italy) Massimo Cierro
April 14	Parioli Challenger; Rome, Italy $25,000 – clay – 32S/16D; Singles draw – Doubles draw	(Italy) Paolo Canè (Italy) Simone Colombo; 6–1, 6–4	(Switzerland) Stephan Medem (Switzerland) Dominik Utzinger	(France) Éric Winogradsky (Italy) Paolo Canè	(Sweden) Christian Bergström (Italy) Massimiliano Narducci (Argentina) Franco Davín (Italy) Massimo Cierro
April 21	No tournaments scheduled.				
April 28	Loipersdorf Challenger; Loipersdorf, Austria $50,000 – clay – 32S/16D; Singles draw – Doubles draw	(Austria) Thomas Muster; 6–3, 7–5	(Sweden) Ulf Stenlund	(Australia) Darren Cahill (Australia) Mark Kratzmann	(West Germany) Thomas Schaeck (Romania) Florin Segărceanu (Italy) Claudio Pistolesi (Italy) Gianluca Pozzi
April 28	Loipersdorf Challenger; Loipersdorf, Austria $50,000 – clay – 32S/16D; Singles draw – Doubles draw	(Australia) Brad Drewett (Australia) Wally Masur; 6–1, 6–4	(Sweden) Peter Carlsson (Finland) Olli Rahnasto	(Australia) Darren Cahill (Australia) Mark Kratzmann	(West Germany) Thomas Schaeck (Romania) Florin Segărceanu (Italy) Claudio Pistolesi (Italy) Gianluca Pozzi
April 28	Nagoya Challenger; Nagoya, Japan $39,000 – hard – 32S/16D; Singles draw – Doubles draw	(New Zealand) Russell Simpson; 7–5, 5–7, 6–4	(United States) Val Wilder	(United States) Craig Kardon (Nigeria) Tony Mmoh	(Australia) Shane Barr (United States) Mark Wooldridge (United States) Morris Strode (United States) Scott McCain
April 28	Nagoya Challenger; Nagoya, Japan $39,000 – hard – 32S/16D; Singles draw – Doubles draw	(New Zealand) David Mustard (New Zealand) Russell Simpson; 7–5, 5–7, 6–4	(Australia) Shane Barr (United States) Scott McCain	(United States) Craig Kardon (Nigeria) Tony Mmoh	(Australia) Shane Barr (United States) Mark Wooldridge (United States) Morris Strode (United States) Scott McCain

=== June ===
Week of	Tournament	Champions	Runners-up	Semifinalists	Quarterfinalists
June 2	Tampere Open; Tampere, Finland $25,000 – clay – 32S/16D; Singles draw – Doubles draw	(Sweden) Christian Bergström; 4–6, 7–5, 6–4	(Italy) Massimo Cierro	(Argentina) Javier Frana (Greece) George Kalovelonis	(Italy) Alessandro de Minicis (Soviet Union) Oleksandr Dolgopolov Sr. (Sweden) Ronnie Båthman (Sweden) Christer Allgårdh
June 2	Tampere Open; Tampere, Finland $25,000 – clay – 32S/16D; Singles draw – Doubles draw	(Soviet Union) Ģirts Dzelde (Soviet Union) Sergey Leonyuk w/o	(Italy) Alessandro de Minicis (Greece) George Kalovelonis	(Argentina) Javier Frana (Greece) George Kalovelonis	(Italy) Alessandro de Minicis (Soviet Union) Oleksandr Dolgopolov Sr. (Sweden) Ronnie Båthman (Sweden) Christer Allgårdh
June 9	No tournaments scheduled.				
June 16	Bergen-1 Challenger; Bergen, Norway $25,000 – clay – 32S/16D; Singles draw – Doubles draw	(United States) Mark Buckley; 1–6, 7–6, 6–2	(Sweden) Christer Allgårdh	(South Africa) Craig Campbell (Sweden) Christian Bergström	(Romania) Andrei Dîrzu (Argentina) Christian Miniussi (Israel) Gilad Bloom (Italy) Simone Colombo
June 16	Bergen-1 Challenger; Bergen, Norway $25,000 – clay – 32S/16D; Singles draw – Doubles draw	(Sweden) Christer Allgårdh (Israel) Gilad Bloom; 6–4, 4–6, 6–4	(Switzerland) Stephan Medem (West Germany) Harald Rittersbacher	(South Africa) Craig Campbell (Sweden) Christian Bergström	(Romania) Andrei Dîrzu (Argentina) Christian Miniussi (Israel) Gilad Bloom (Italy) Simone Colombo
June 23	Clermont-Ferrand Challenger; Clermont-Ferrand, France $25,000 – clay – 32S/16D; Singles draw – Doubles draw	(Italy) Claudio Panatta; 6-3, 2–1. Ret.	(Paraguay) Víctor Pecci	(Argentina) Christian Miniussi (Argentina) Guillermo Pérez Roldán	(West Germany) Peter Elter (France) Jérôme Potier (Netherlands) Menno Oosting (France) Thierry Van Den Daele
June 23	Clermont-Ferrand Challenger; Clermont-Ferrand, France $25,000 – clay – 32S/16D; Singles draw – Doubles draw	(Argentina) Javier Frana (Argentina) Gustavo Guerrero; 6–1, 6–0	(Israel) Gilad Bloom (West Germany) Carl-Uwe Steeb	(Argentina) Christian Miniussi (Argentina) Guillermo Pérez Roldán	(West Germany) Peter Elter (France) Jérôme Potier (Netherlands) Menno Oosting (France) Thierry Van Den Daele
June 30	Chartres Challenger; Chartres, France $25,000 – clay – 32S/16D; Singles draw – Doubles draw	(Austria) Horst Skoff; 6–4, 6–3	(Paraguay) Víctor Pecci	(Argentina) Franco Davín (Italy) Corrado Aprili	(Haiti) Ronald Agénor (Sweden) Johan Carlsson (Sweden) Christian Bergström (West Germany) Carl-Uwe Steeb
June 30	Chartres Challenger; Chartres, France $25,000 – clay – 32S/16D; Singles draw – Doubles draw	(Argentina) Javier Frana (Argentina) Gustavo Guerrero; 6–2, 6–4	(Iran) Mansour Bahrami (France) Éric Winogradsky	(Argentina) Franco Davín (Italy) Corrado Aprili	(Haiti) Ronald Agénor (Sweden) Johan Carlsson (Sweden) Christian Bergström (West Germany) Carl-Uwe Steeb

=== July ===
Week of	Tournament	Champions	Runners-up	Semifinalists	Quarterfinalists
July 7	Dortmund Challenger; Dortmund, West Germany $25,000 – clay – 48S/24D; Singles draw – Doubles draw	(Austria) Horst Skoff; 2–6, 6–3, 6–4	(Spain) Fernando Lleó	(West Germany) Peter Moraing (Spain) Eduardo Osta	(West Germany) Peter Elter (South Africa) Denys Maasdorp (West Germany) Carl-Uwe Steeb (Australia) Carl Limberger
July 7	Dortmund Challenger; Dortmund, West Germany $25,000 – clay – 48S/24D; Singles draw – Doubles draw	(West Germany) Wolfgang Popp (Netherlands) Huub van Boeckel; 6–3, 6–2	(Czechoslovakia) Jaroslav Navrátil (Czechoslovakia) Richard Vogel	(West Germany) Peter Moraing (Spain) Eduardo Osta	(West Germany) Peter Elter (South Africa) Denys Maasdorp (West Germany) Carl-Uwe Steeb (Australia) Carl Limberger
July 14	Hanko Challenger; Hanko, Finland $50,000 – clay – 32S/16D; Singles draw – Doubles draw	(Spain) Juan Antonio Rodríguez; 2–6, 6–1, 6–2	(Sweden) Jan Gunnarsson	(West Germany) Peter Elter (Sweden) Ronnie Båthman	(Sweden) Magnus Tideman (Finland) Joakim Berner (Italy) Gianluca Pozzi (Spain) Eduardo Osta
July 14	Hanko Challenger; Hanko, Finland $50,000 – clay – 32S/16D; Singles draw – Doubles draw	(Sweden) Ronnie Båthman (United States) Joey Rive; 7–6, 7–6	(United States) Bud Cox (Australia) Michael Fancutt	(West Germany) Peter Elter (Sweden) Ronnie Båthman	(Sweden) Magnus Tideman (Finland) Joakim Berner (Italy) Gianluca Pozzi (Spain) Eduardo Osta
July 14	OTB Open; Schenectady, USA $50,000 – hard – 32S/16D; Singles draw – Doubles draw	(India) Ramesh Krishnan; 6–2, 6–3	(United States) Andre Agassi	(South Africa) Barry Moir (United States) Jim Grabb	(Sweden) Johan Carlsson (South Africa) Michael Robertson (United States) Brett Dickinson (United States) Derrick Rostagno
July 14	OTB Open; Schenectady, USA $50,000 – hard – 32S/16D; Singles draw – Doubles draw	(South Africa) Gary Muller (United States) Todd Nelson; 6–2, 6–4	(United States) Matt Anger (New Zealand) Russell Simpson	(South Africa) Barry Moir (United States) Jim Grabb	(Sweden) Johan Carlsson (South Africa) Michael Robertson (United States) Brett Dickinson (United States) Derrick Rostagno
July 14	Travemünde Challenger; Travemünde, West Germany $25,000 – clay – 48S/24D; Singles draw – Doubles draw	(West Germany) Alex Stepanek; 6–2, 6–0	(Australia) Carl Limberger	(Italy) Massimo Cierro (Sweden) Thomas Högstedt	(Mexico) Héctor Ortiz (Italy) Marco Armellini (Argentina) Javier Frana (South Africa) Henri de Wet
July 14	Travemünde Challenger; Travemünde, West Germany $25,000 – clay – 48S/24D; Singles draw – Doubles draw	(United States) Jim Pugh (Australia) Des Tyson; 4–6, 6–3, 6–4	(Spain) Jesus Colas (South Africa) Henri de Wet	(Italy) Massimo Cierro (Sweden) Thomas Högstedt	(Mexico) Héctor Ortiz (Italy) Marco Armellini (Argentina) Javier Frana (South Africa) Henri de Wet
July 21	Berkeley Challenger; Berkeley, USA $25,000 – hard – 32S/16D; Singles draw – Doubles draw	(United States) Brad Pearce; 6–1, 6–1	(United States) Mike Bauer	(Canada) Grant Connell (United States) Matt Doyle	(United States) Bill Scanlon (United States) Paul Chamberlin (United States) Richard Matuszewski (United States) Jeff Klaparda
July 21	Berkeley Challenger; Berkeley, USA $25,000 – hard – 32S/16D; Singles draw – Doubles draw	(United States) Randy Nixon (United States) Peter Wright; 6–4, 6–3	(United States) Mike Bauer (United States) Charles Strode	(Canada) Grant Connell (United States) Matt Doyle	(United States) Bill Scanlon (United States) Paul Chamberlin (United States) Richard Matuszewski (United States) Jeff Klaparda
July 21	Campos Challenger; Campos, Brazil $25,000 – hard – 32S/16D; Singles draw – Doubles draw	(Brazil) Ivan Kley; 6–7, 7–6, 7–6	(Brazil) João Soares	(Brazil) Carlos Kirmayr (Chile) Pedro Rebolledo	(Brazil) Roger Guedes (Brazil) Júlio Góes (Nigeria) Tony Mmoh (Brazil) Nelson Aerts
July 21	Campos Challenger; Campos, Brazil $25,000 – hard – 32S/16D; Singles draw – Doubles draw	(Brazil) Dácio Campos (Brazil) Carlos Kirmayr; 7–6, 7–5	(Brazil) Givaldo Barbosa (Brazil) Ivan Kley	(Brazil) Carlos Kirmayr (Chile) Pedro Rebolledo	(Brazil) Roger Guedes (Brazil) Júlio Góes (Nigeria) Tony Mmoh (Brazil) Nelson Aerts
July 21	Neu-Ulm Challenger; Neu-Ulm, West Germany $25,000 – clay – 48S/24D; Singles draw – Doubles draw	(Italy) Simone Colombo; 6–7, 6–4, 6–1	(Israel) Gilad Bloom	(West Germany) Jaromir Becka (Argentina) Javier Frana	(Australia) Carl Limberger (Italy) Edoardo Mazza (West Germany) Christian Saceanu (United Kingdom) Nick Fulwood
July 21	Neu-Ulm Challenger; Neu-Ulm, West Germany $25,000 – clay – 48S/24D; Singles draw – Doubles draw	(Iran) Mansour Bahrami (Czechoslovakia) Jaroslav Navrátil; 7–5, 6–1	(Netherlands) Menno Oosting (Netherlands) Huub van Boeckel	(West Germany) Jaromir Becka (Argentina) Javier Frana	(Australia) Carl Limberger (Italy) Edoardo Mazza (West Germany) Christian Saceanu (United Kingdom) Nick Fulwood
July 21	Sapporo Challenger; Sapporo, Japan $25,000 – hard – 32S/16D; Singles draw – Doubles draw	(Japan) Toru Yonezawa; 6–0, 7–5	(Japan) Tsuyoshi Fukui	(Japan) Tetsu Kuramitsu (United States) Tom Toomey	(Japan) Shozo Shiraishi (China) Shu-Wah Liu (Japan) Toshiro Sakai (West Germany) Ulf Fischer
July 21	Sapporo Challenger; Sapporo, Japan $25,000 – hard – 32S/16D; Singles draw – Doubles draw	(China) Shu-Wah Liu (China) Ma Keqin; 7–5, 6–1	(Japan) Tsuyoshi Fukui (Japan) Nobuya Tamura	(Japan) Tetsu Kuramitsu (United States) Tom Toomey	(Japan) Shozo Shiraishi (China) Shu-Wah Liu (Japan) Toshiro Sakai (West Germany) Ulf Fischer
July 28	PTT İstanbul Cup; Istanbul, Turkey $25,000 – clay – 32S/16D; Singles draw – Doubles draw	(United States) Jim Pugh; 6–4, 6–2	(Soviet Union) Alexander Zverev	(Austria) Alex Antonitsch (United States) Bud Cox	(Soviet Union) Andrei Chesnokov (Greece) George Kalovelonis (West Germany) Christian Saceanu (India) Srinivasan Vasudevan
July 28	PTT İstanbul Cup; Istanbul, Turkey $25,000 – clay – 32S/16D; Singles draw – Doubles draw	(United States) Bud Cox (Australia) Michael Fancutt; 6–3, 6–2	(Denmark) Peter Bastiansen (Greece) George Kalovelonis	(Austria) Alex Antonitsch (United States) Bud Cox	(Soviet Union) Andrei Chesnokov (Greece) George Kalovelonis (West Germany) Christian Saceanu (India) Srinivasan Vasudevan
July 28	São Paulo-2 Challenger; São Paulo, Brazil $25,000 – clay – 32S/16D; Singles draw – Doubles draw	(Brazil) Carlos Kirmayr; 6–4, 6–3	(Brazil) Luiz Mattar	(Brazil) Danilo Marcelino (Brazil) Júlio Góes	(Brazil) Fernando Roese (Brazil) Marcos Hocevar (Brazil) Ivan Kley (Chile) Pedro Rebolledo
July 28	São Paulo-2 Challenger; São Paulo, Brazil $25,000 – clay – 32S/16D; Singles draw – Doubles draw	(Brazil) Givaldo Barbosa (Brazil) Ivan Kley; 7–6, 6–1	(Brazil) Fernando Roese (Brazil) João Soares	(Brazil) Danilo Marcelino (Brazil) Júlio Góes	(Brazil) Fernando Roese (Brazil) Marcos Hocevar (Brazil) Ivan Kley (Chile) Pedro Rebolledo

=== August ===
Week of	Tournament	Champions	Runners-up	Semifinalists	Quarterfinalists
August 4	Raleigh Challenger; Raleigh, United States $25,000 – clay – 32S/16D; Singles draw – Doubles draw	(United States) Jimmy Brown; 7–6, 6–3	(United States) Mel Purcell	(United States) Jay Berger (United States) Jim Gurfein	(United States) Jim Pugh (Brazil) Ricardo Acioly (United States) Richey Reneberg (United States) Richard Matuszewski
August 4	Raleigh Challenger; Raleigh, United States $25,000 – clay – 32S/16D; Singles draw – Doubles draw	(United States) Rick Leach (United States) Jim Pugh; 6–4, 6–3	(United States) Mark Basham (United States) Ron Erskine	(United States) Jay Berger (United States) Jim Gurfein	(United States) Jim Pugh (Brazil) Ricardo Acioly (United States) Richey Reneberg (United States) Richard Matuszewski
August 11	Knokke Challenger; Knokke, Belgium $25,000 – clay – 32S/16D; Singles draw – Doubles draw	(Chile) Gerardo Vacarezza; 6–3, 6–3	(Sweden) Christer Allgårdh	(Belgium) Bernard Boileau (Sweden) Peter Lindgren	(Argentina) Juan Carlos Rodríguez (India) Srinivasan Vasudevan (Brazil) Sérgio Ribeiro (United Kingdom) Mike Walker
August 11	Knokke Challenger; Knokke, Belgium $25,000 – clay – 32S/16D; Singles draw – Doubles draw	(Brazil) Danilo Marcelino (Mexico) Héctor Ortiz; 6–4, 6–7, 6–3	(Belgium) Alain Brichant (Belgium) Jan Vanlangendonck	(Belgium) Bernard Boileau (Sweden) Peter Lindgren	(Argentina) Juan Carlos Rodríguez (India) Srinivasan Vasudevan (Brazil) Sérgio Ribeiro (United Kingdom) Mike Walker
August 11	New Haven Challenger; New Haven, United States $25,000 – hard – 32S/16D; Singles draw – Doubles draw	(United States) Brad Pearce; 1–6, 7–6, 6–0	(United States) Ben Testerman	(United States) Jim Pugh (United States) Ricky Brown	(United States) Bill Scanlon (South Africa) Brian Levine (United States) Jay Lapidus (United States) Tomm Warneke
August 11	New Haven Challenger; New Haven, United States $25,000 – hard – 32S/16D; Singles draw – Doubles draw	(United States) Marc Flur (United States) Brad Pearce; 6–2, 6–4	(United States) Rick Leach (United States) Tim Pawsat	(United States) Jim Pugh (United States) Ricky Brown	(United States) Bill Scanlon (South Africa) Brian Levine (United States) Jay Lapidus (United States) Tomm Warneke
August 18	No tournaments scheduled.				
August 25	No tournaments scheduled.				

=== September ===
Week of	Tournament	Champions	Runners-up	Semifinalists	Quarterfinalists
September 1	International Tournament of Messina; Messina, Italy $50,000 – clay – 32S/16D; Singles draw – Doubles draw	(France) Tarik Benhabiles; 6–3, 6–7, 6–3	(Italy) Simone Colombo	(Italy) Massimo Cierro (Argentina) Christian Miniussi	(Sweden) Christer Allgårdh (Argentina) Marcelo Ingaramo (Paraguay) Víctor Pecci (Sweden) Magnus Gustafsson
September 1	International Tournament of Messina; Messina, Italy $50,000 – clay – 32S/16D; Singles draw – Doubles draw	(Sweden) Ronnie Båthman (Peru) Carlos di Laura; 2–6, 6–3, 7–5	(United States) Brett Buffington (South Africa) Denys Maasdorp	(Italy) Massimo Cierro (Argentina) Christian Miniussi	(Sweden) Christer Allgårdh (Argentina) Marcelo Ingaramo (Paraguay) Víctor Pecci (Sweden) Magnus Gustafsson
September 8	Thessaloniki Challenger; Thessaloniki, Greece $25,000 – hard – 32S/16D; Singles draw – Doubles draw	(Sweden) Thomas Högstedt; 6–2, 6–2	(Austria) Alex Antonitsch	(Israel) Gilad Bloom (United Kingdom) Steve Shaw	(South Africa) Denys Maasdorp (West Germany) Christian Saceanu (United States) Bud Cox (Denmark) Morten Christensen
September 8	Thessaloniki Challenger; Thessaloniki, Greece $25,000 – hard – 32S/16D; Singles draw – Doubles draw	(West Germany) Jaromir Becka (West Germany) Christian Saceanu; 3–6, 6–1, 7–6	(Austria) Alex Antonitsch (South Africa) Brian Levine	(Israel) Gilad Bloom (United Kingdom) Steve Shaw	(South Africa) Denys Maasdorp (West Germany) Christian Saceanu (United States) Bud Cox (Denmark) Morten Christensen
September 15	Budapest Challenger; Budapest, Hungary $25,000 – clay – 32S/16D; Singles draw – Doubles draw	(Sweden) Jörgen Windahl; 6–1, 7–5	(Czechoslovakia) Jaroslav Navrátil	(New Zealand) Steve Guy (Sweden) Christer Allgårdh	(Italy) Gianluca Pozzi (United States) Derek Tarr (Czechoslovakia) Stanislav Birner (Austria) Stefan Lochbihler
September 15	Budapest Challenger; Budapest, Hungary $25,000 – clay – 32S/16D; Singles draw – Doubles draw	(Czechoslovakia) Stanislav Birner (Czechoslovakia) Cyril Suk; 6–1, 7–5	(Denmark) Peter Bastiansen (United States) Brett Buffington	(New Zealand) Steve Guy (Sweden) Christer Allgårdh	(Italy) Gianluca Pozzi (United States) Derek Tarr (Czechoslovakia) Stanislav Birner (Austria) Stefan Lochbihler
September 22	Brisbane Challenger; Brisbane, Australia $25,000 – hard – 48S/24D; Singles draw – Doubles draw	(Australia) Brad Drewett; 0–6, 6–1, 6–4	(Australia) Craig A. Miller	(United States) Bobby Banck (New Zealand) David Mustard	(Australia) Peter Doohan (Australia) Todd Woodbridge (Australia) Shane Barr (Australia) Peter Thrupp
September 22	Brisbane Challenger; Brisbane, Australia $25,000 – hard – 48S/24D; Singles draw – Doubles draw	(Australia) Peter Doohan (Australia) Laurie Warder; 7–5, 7–5	(Australia) Brad Drewett (Australia) Craig A. Miller	(United States) Bobby Banck (New Zealand) David Mustard	(Australia) Peter Doohan (Australia) Todd Woodbridge (Australia) Shane Barr (Australia) Peter Thrupp
September 22	West Palm Challenger; West Palm, USA $25,000 – clay – 32S/16D; Singles draw – Doubles draw	(United States) Jay Berger; 4–6, 6–4, 6–2	(United States) Mark Buckley	(West Germany) Peter Moraing (United States) Marc Flur	(United States) Derek Tarr (Canada) Hatem McDadi (United States) Harold Solomon (Argentina) Roberto Saad
September 22	West Palm Challenger; West Palm, USA $25,000 – clay – 32S/16D; Singles draw – Doubles draw	(United States) John Ross (United States) Derek Tarr; 4–6, 6–4, 6–4	(United States) Ricky Brown (United States) Tim Siegel	(West Germany) Peter Moraing (United States) Marc Flur	(United States) Derek Tarr (Canada) Hatem McDadi (United States) Harold Solomon (Argentina) Roberto Saad
September 29	Athens Challenger; Athens, Greece $25,000 – hard – 32S/16D; Singles draw – Doubles draw	(Sweden) Lars-Anders Wahlgren; 6–4, 6–3	(West Germany) Hans-Dieter Beutel	(Canada) Martin Laurendeau (West Germany) Patrik Kühnen	(South Africa) Brian Levine (Sweden) Peter Carlsson (Canada) Andrew Sznajder (West Germany) Christian Saceanu
September 29	Athens Challenger; Athens, Greece $25,000 – hard – 32S/16D; Singles draw – Doubles draw	(West Germany) Wolfgang Popp (West Germany) Udo Riglewski; 2–6, 6–2, 7–6	(Sweden) Stefan Svensson (Sweden) Lars-Anders Wahlgren	(Canada) Martin Laurendeau (West Germany) Patrik Kühnen	(South Africa) Brian Levine (Sweden) Peter Carlsson (Canada) Andrew Sznajder (West Germany) Christian Saceanu

=== October ===
Week of	Tournament	Champions	Runners-up	Semifinalists	Quarterfinalists
October 6	No tournaments scheduled.				
October 13	Grand Prix Hassan II; Casablanca, Morocco $50,000 – clay – 32S/16D; Singles draw – Doubles draw	(West Germany) Hans Schwaier; 6–3, 6–3	(Sweden) Jörgen Windahl	(Morocco) Arafa Chekrouni (France) Tarik Benhabiles	(United States) Jay Berger (West Germany) Wolfgang Popp (United States) Mark Dickson (Spain) Juan Avendaño
October 13	Grand Prix Hassan II; Casablanca, Morocco $50,000 – clay – 32S/16D; Singles draw – Doubles draw	(Mexico) Agustín Moreno (United States) Larry Scott; 7–5, 6–2	(West Germany) Tore Meinecke (West Germany) Ricki Osterthun	(Morocco) Arafa Chekrouni (France) Tarik Benhabiles	(United States) Jay Berger (West Germany) Wolfgang Popp (United States) Mark Dickson (Spain) Juan Avendaño
October 20	No tournaments scheduled.				
October 27	Chilean Open; Santiago, Chile $25,000 – clay – 32S/16D; Singles draw – Doubles draw	(Peru) Pablo Arraya; 2–6, 7–6, 6–0	(United States) Mark Dickson	(United States) Derek Tarr (Paraguay) Hugo Chapacú	(Chile) Hans Gildemeister (Chile) Gerardo Vacarezza (United States) Mark Buckley (Argentina) Alejandro Ganzábal
October 27	Chilean Open; Santiago, Chile $25,000 – clay – 32S/16D; Singles draw – Doubles draw	(Chile) Ricardo Acuña (Chile) Hans Gildemeister; 7–6, 7–6	(United States) Mark Dickson (United States) Derek Tarr	(United States) Derek Tarr (Paraguay) Hugo Chapacú	(Chile) Hans Gildemeister (Chile) Gerardo Vacarezza (United States) Mark Buckley (Argentina) Alejandro Ganzábal
October 27	Fukuoka Challenger; Fukuoka, Japan $25,000 – hard – 32S/16D; Singles draw – Doubles draw	(United States) Leif Shiras; 6–3, 1–6, 7–6	(United States) Jim Grabb	(United States) Cary Stansbury (New Zealand) Steve Guy	(United States) Rick Rudeen (Finland) Olli Rahnasto (United States) Danny Saltz (United States) Paul Chamberlin
October 27	Fukuoka Challenger; Fukuoka, Japan $25,000 – hard – 32S/16D; Singles draw – Doubles draw	(United States) Jim Grabb (United States) Larry Stefanki; 6–1, 6–3	(United States) David Dowlen (United States) Leif Shiras	(United States) Cary Stansbury (New Zealand) Steve Guy	(United States) Rick Rudeen (Finland) Olli Rahnasto (United States) Danny Saltz (United States) Paul Chamberlin

=== November ===
Week of	Tournament	Champions	Runners-up	Semifinalists	Quarterfinalists
November 3	São Paulo-3 Challenger; São Paulo, Brazil $75,000 – hard – 32S/16D; Singles draw – Doubles draw	(Argentina) Eduardo Bengoechea; 6–3, 6–4	(Brazil) Luiz Mattar	(United States) Jay Berger (Czechoslovakia) Marián Vajda	(Spain) José López-Maeso (Brazil) Fernando Roese (United States) Sammy Giammalva Jr. (Brazil) Dácio Campos
November 3	São Paulo-3 Challenger; São Paulo, Brazil $75,000 – hard – 32S/16D; Singles draw – Doubles draw	(Brazil) César Kist (Brazil) João Soares; 6–4, 3–6, 6–3	(Brazil) Dácio Campos (Brazil) Carlos Kirmayr	(United States) Jay Berger (Czechoslovakia) Marián Vajda	(Spain) José López-Maeso (Brazil) Fernando Roese (United States) Sammy Giammalva Jr. (Brazil) Dácio Campos
November 10	Helsinki Challenger; Helsinki, Finland $25,000 – carpet (I) – 32S/16D; Singles draw – Doubles draw	(West Germany) Patrik Kühnen; 6–4, 7–6	(Czechoslovakia) Jaroslav Navrátil	(West Germany) Wolfgang Popp (Sweden) Peter Carlsson	(Denmark) Michael Tauson (France) Éric Winogradsky (Sweden) Lars-Anders Wahlgren (United States) Kelly Jones
November 10	Helsinki Challenger; Helsinki, Finland $25,000 – carpet (I) – 32S/16D; Singles draw – Doubles draw	(Sweden) Peter Carlsson (Sweden) Jörgen Windahl; 6–2, 4–6, 7–6	(United States) Kelly Jones (United States) David Livingston	(West Germany) Wolfgang Popp (Sweden) Peter Carlsson	(Denmark) Michael Tauson (France) Éric Winogradsky (Sweden) Lars-Anders Wahlgren (United States) Kelly Jones
November 17	Benin City-2 Challenger; Benin City, Nigeria $50,000 – hard – 32S/16D; Singles draw – Doubles draw	(Nigeria) Nduka Odizor; 7–6, 6–2	(Nigeria) Tony Mmoh	(United Kingdom) Andrew Castle (United States) Jim Gurfein	(Nigeria) Sadiq Abdullahi (Czechoslovakia) Stanislav Birner (United States) Bud Cox (Senegal) Yahiya Doumbia
November 17	Benin City-2 Challenger; Benin City, Nigeria $50,000 – hard – 32S/16D; Singles draw – Doubles draw	(United States) Rill Baxter (United States) Larry Scott; 4–6, 6–3, 6–4	(Czechoslovakia) Stanislav Birner (Switzerland) Jarek Srnensky	(United Kingdom) Andrew Castle (United States) Jim Gurfein	(Nigeria) Sadiq Abdullahi (Czechoslovakia) Stanislav Birner (United States) Bud Cox (Senegal) Yahiya Doumbia
November 17	Bergen-2 Challenger; Bergen, Norway $50,000 – carpet (I) – 32S/16D; Singles draw – Doubles draw	(United States) Peter Fleming; 6–4, 6–1	(Sweden) Jan Gunnarsson	(Canada) Martin Laurendeau (Sweden) Peter Carlsson	(Sweden) Ronnie Båthman (United States) Dan Goldie (Sweden) Johan Carlsson (Netherlands) Menno Oosting
November 17	Bergen-2 Challenger; Bergen, Norway $50,000 – carpet (I) – 32S/16D; Singles draw – Doubles draw	(United States) Kelly Jones (United States) David Livingston; 6–7, 7–6, 7–5	(Denmark) Peter Bastiansen (West Germany) Patrik Kühnen	(Canada) Martin Laurendeau (Sweden) Peter Carlsson	(Sweden) Ronnie Båthman (United States) Dan Goldie (Sweden) Johan Carlsson (Netherlands) Menno Oosting
November 24	Lagos-2 Challenger; Lagos, Nigeria $50,000 – hard – 32S/16D; Singles draw – Doubles draw	(Nigeria) Nduka Odizor; 7–5, 6–4	(United Kingdom) Andrew Castle	(Nigeria) Tony Mmoh (India) Srinivasan Vasudevan	(United States) Brett Dickinson (Senegal) Yahiya Doumbia (Austria) Bernhard Pils (France) Jean-Marc Piacentile
November 24	Lagos-2 Challenger; Lagos, Nigeria $50,000 – hard – 32S/16D; Singles draw – Doubles draw	(United States) Rill Baxter (United States) Larry Scott; 6–7, 7–6, 6–3	(Colombia) Álvaro Jordan (France) Jean-Marc Piacentile	(Nigeria) Tony Mmoh (India) Srinivasan Vasudevan	(United States) Brett Dickinson (Senegal) Yahiya Doumbia (Austria) Bernhard Pils (France) Jean-Marc Piacentile
November 24	Valkenswaard Challenger; Valkenswaard, The Netherlands $25,000 – carpet (I) – 32S/16D; Singles draw – Doubles draw	(Netherlands) Huub van Boeckel; 6–4, 6–3	(West Germany) Wolfgang Popp	(Canada) Grant Connell (Israel) Gilad Bloom	(Netherlands) Christian Feenstra (West Germany) Peter Moraing (Sweden) Fredrik Waern (West Germany) Hans-Dieter Beutel
November 24	Valkenswaard Challenger; Valkenswaard, The Netherlands $25,000 – carpet (I) – 32S/16D; Singles draw – Doubles draw	(West Germany) Wolfgang Popp (West Germany) Udo Riglewski; 0–6, 6–4, 6–1	(Netherlands) Michiel Schapers (South Africa) Freddie Sauer	(Canada) Grant Connell (Israel) Gilad Bloom	(Netherlands) Christian Feenstra (West Germany) Peter Moraing (Sweden) Fredrik Waern (West Germany) Hans-Dieter Beutel

=== December ===
Week of	Tournament	Champions	Runners-up	Semifinalists	Quarterfinalists
December 1	Ikeja Challenger; Ikeja, Nigeria $25,000 – clay – 32S/16D; Singles draw – Doubles draw	(Czechoslovakia) Stanislav Birner; 4–6, 6–3, 6–3	(Austria) Bernhard Pils	(United Kingdom) Jason Goodall (India) Srinivasan Vasudevan	(Nigeria) Nduka Odizor (Nigeria) Tony Mmoh (France) Paul Torre (United Kingdom) Nick Fulwood
December 1	Ikeja Challenger; Ikeja, Nigeria $25,000 – clay – 32S/16D; Singles draw – Doubles draw	(Nigeria) Tony Mmoh (Nigeria) Nduka Odizor; 6–4, 7–6	(Senegal) Yahiya Doumbia (United States) Mike Smith	(United Kingdom) Jason Goodall (India) Srinivasan Vasudevan	(Nigeria) Nduka Odizor (Nigeria) Tony Mmoh (France) Paul Torre (United Kingdom) Nick Fulwood
December 1	Rio de Janeiro-2 Challenger; Rio de Janeiro, Brazil $50,000 – hard – 32S/16D; Singles draw – Doubles draw	(Brazil) Cássio Motta; 6–2, 6–3	(Brazil) Carlos Kirmayr	(Brazil) Ivan Kley (Argentina) Roberto Saad	(Brazil) Alexandre Hocevar (Argentina) Javier Frana (Brazil) Luiz Mattar (Brazil) Danilo Marcelino

== Statistical information ==
These tables present the number of singles (S) and doubles (D) titles won by each player and each nation during the season, within all the tournament categories of the 1986 ATP Challenger Series. The players/nations are sorted by: (1) total number of titles (a doubles title won by two players representing the same nation counts as only one win for the nation); (2) a singles > doubles hierarchy; (3) alphabetical order (by family names for players).

=== Titles won by player ===
Total	Player	S	D
5	Carlos Kirmayr (BRA)	1	4
4	Nduka Odizor (NGR)	3	1
4	Stanislav Birner (TCH)	2	2
4	Cássio Motta (BRA)	2	2
3	Simone Colombo (ITA)	2	1
3	Ivan Kley (BRA)	2	1
3	Brad Pearce (USA)	2	1
3	Jim Pugh (USA)	1	2
3	Ronnie Båthman (SWE)	0	3
3	Wolfgang Popp (FRG)	0	3
3	Larry Scott (USA)	0	3
2	Horst Skoff (AUT)	2	0
2	Eduardo Bengoechea (ARG)	1	1
2	Carlos di Laura (PER)	1	1
2	Brad Drewett (AUS)	1	1
2	Hans Gildemeister (CHI)	1	1
2	Luiz Mattar (BRA)	1	1
2	Olli Rahnasto (FIN)	1	1
2	Russell Simpson (NZL)	1	1
2	Huub van Boeckel (NED)	1	1
2	Jörgen Windahl (SWE)	1	1
2	Rill Baxter (USA)	0	2
2	Paolo Canè (ITA)	0	2
2	Bud Cox (USA)	0	2
2	David Felgate (GBR)	0	2
2	Javier Frana (ARG)	0	2
2	Gustavo Guerrero (ARG)	0	2
2	Gustavo Luza (ARG)	0	2
2	Tony Mmoh (NGR)	0	2
2	Gary Muller (RSA)	0	2
2	Udo Riglewski (FRG)	0	2
2	Gustavo Tiberti (ARG)	0	2
1	Pablo Arraya (PER)	1	0
1	Tarik Benhabiles (FRA)	1	0
1	Jay Berger (USA)	1	0
1	Christian Bergström (SWE)	1	0
1	Jimmy Brown (USA)	1	0
1	Mark Buckley (USA)	1	0
1	David de Miguel (ESP)	1	0
1	Gary Donnelly (USA)	1	0
1	Peter Elter (FRG)	1	0
1	Peter Fleming (USA)	1	0
1	Marcel Freeman (USA)	1	0
1	Thomas Högstedt (SWE)	1	0
1	Ramesh Krishnan (IND)	1	0
1	Patrik Kühnen (FRG)	1	0
1	Fernando Luna (ESP)	1	0
1	Amos Mansdorf (ISR)	1	0
1	Thomas Muster (AUT)	1	0
1	Marko Ostoja (YUG)	1	0
1	Claudio Panatta (ITA)	1	0
1	Pedro Rebolledo (CHI)	1	0
1	Juan Antonio Rodríguez (ESP)	1	0
1	Derrick Rostagno (USA)	1	0
1	Hans Schwaier (FRG)	1	0
1	Leif Shiras (USA)	1	0
1	Alex Stepanek (FRG)	1	0
1	Gerardo Vacarezza (CHI)	1	0
1	Lars-Anders Wahlgren (SWE)	1	0
1	Toru Yonezawa (JPN)	1	0
1	Ricardo Acuña (CHI)	0	1
1	Christer Allgårdh (SWE)	0	1
1	Jordi Arrese (ESP)	0	1
1	Mansour Bahrami (IRN)	0	1
1	Givaldo Barbosa (BRA)	0	1
1	Jorge Bardou (ESP)	0	1
1	Jaromir Becka (FRG)	0	1
1	Gilad Bloom (ISR)	0	1
1	Dácio Campos (BRA)	0	1
1	Peter Carlsson (SWE)	0	1
1	Bruce Derlin (NZL)	0	1
1	Peter Doohan (AUS)	0	1
1	Ģirts Dzelde (URS)	0	1
1	Michael Fancutt (AUS)	0	1
1	Marc Flur (USA)	0	1
1	Nick Fulwood (GBR)	0	1
1	Jim Grabb (USA)	0	1
1	Kelly Jones (USA)	0	1
1	César Kist (BRA)	0	1
1	Rick Leach (USA)	0	1
1	Sergey Leonyuk (URS)	0	1
1	Brian Levine (RSA)	0	1
1	Jon Levine (USA)	0	1
1	Shu-Wah Liu (CHN)	0	1
1	David Livingston (USA)	0	1
1	Ma Keqin (CHN)	0	1
1	Danilo Marcelino (BRA)	0	1
1	Wally Masur (AUS)	0	1
1	Claudio Mezzadri (SUI)	0	1
1	Agustín Moreno (MEX)	0	1
1	David Mustard (NZL)	0	1
1	Jaroslav Navrátil (TCH)	0	1
1	Todd Nelson (USA)	0	1
1	Randy Nixon (USA)	0	1
1	Karel Nováček (TCH)	0	1
1	Héctor Ortiz (MEX)	0	1
1	Leo Palin (FIN)	0	1
1	Diego Pérez (URU)	0	1
1	Joey Rive (USA)	0	1
1	John Ross (USA)	0	1
1	Rick Rudeen (USA)	0	1
1	Christian Saceanu (FRG)	0	1
1	João Soares (BRA)	0	1
1	Jarek Srnensky (SUI)	0	1
1	Larry Stefanki (USA)	0	1
1	Charles Strode (USA)	0	1
1	Cyril Suk (TCH)	0	1
1	Stefan Svensson (SWE)	0	1
1	Derek Tarr (USA)	0	1
1	Des Tyson (AUS)	0	1
1	Richard Vogel (TCH)	0	1
1	Laurie Warder (AUS)	0	1
1	Todd Witsken (USA)	0	1
1	Peter Wright (USA)	0	1

=== Titles won by nation ===
Total	Nation	S	D
27	United States (USA)	11	16
13	Brazil (BRA)	6	7
9	Sweden (SWE)	4	5
8	West Germany (FRG)	4	4
6	Czechoslovakia (TCH)	2	4
6	Argentina (ARG)	1	5
5	Italy (ITA)	3	2
5	Nigeria (NGR)	3	2
5	Australia (AUS)	1	4
4	Chile (CHI)	3	1
4	Spain (ESP)	3	1
3	Austria (AUT)	3	0
3	Peru (PER)	2	1
3	New Zealand (NZL)	1	2
2	Finland (FIN)	1	1
2	Israel (ISR)	1	1
2	Netherlands (NED)	1	1
2	Great Britain (GBR)	0	2
2	Mexico (MEX)	0	2
2	South Africa (RSA)	0	2
2	Switzerland (SUI)	0	2
1	France (FRA)	1	0
1	India (IND)	1	0
1	Japan (JPN)	1	0
1	Yugoslavia (YUG)	1	0
1	China (CHN)	0	1
1	Iran (IRN)	0	1
1	Soviet Union (URS)	0	1
1	Uruguay (URU)	0	1

== See also ==
- 1986 Grand Prix
- Association of Tennis Professionals
- International Tennis Federation
