= 1988 Athens Open – Doubles =

Doubles
- 1988 Athens Open

Final
- Champions: (Sweden) Rikard Bergh (Sweden) Per Henricsson
- Runners-up: (Peru) Pablo Arraya (Czechoslovakia) Karel Nováček
- Score: 6–4, 7–5

Events
Singles	Doubles
← 1987 ·	ATP Athens Open	· 1989 →

Tore Meinecke and Ricki Osterthun were the defending champions, but Osterthun did not participate this year. Meinecke partnered Tomás Carbonell, losing in the first round.

Rikard Bergh and Per Henricsson won in the final 6–4, 7–5, against Pablo Arraya and Karel Nováček.

== Seeds ==
1. (Spain) Tomás Carbonell / (West Germany) Tore Meinecke (first round)
2. (United States) Rill Baxter / (United States) Tim Siegel (first round)
3. (West Germany) Wolfgang Popp / (West Germany) Udo Riglewski (semifinals)
4. (Argentina) Marcelo Ingaramo / (West Germany) Hans Schwaier (semifinals)

== Draw ==
=== Key ===
- Q = Qualifier
- WC = Wild card
- LL = Lucky loser
- Alt = Alternate
- ITF = ITF entry
- PR = Protected ranking
- SR = Special ranking
- SE = Special exempt
- JE = Junior exempt
- JR = Junior Accelerator Programme entrant
- CO = College Accelerator Programme entrant
- NG = Next Gen Accelerator Program entrant
- w/o = Walkover
- r = Retired
- d = Defaulted

=== Draw ===
First round
1	(Spain) T Carbonell (West Germany) T Meinecke	7	5	4
(Spain) J Bardou (Spain) V Solves	6	7	6
(Brazil) E Furusho (Brazil) I Kley	2	1^{1}
(Peru) P Arraya (Czechoslovakia) K Nováček	6	1
3	(West Germany) W Popp (West Germany) U Riglewski	6	3	6
(Argentina) F Yunis (Argentina) JC Yunis	4	6	4
(Spain) J Aguilera (Spain) Joel Figueras	6	6
(Spain) A Tous (West Germany) P Vojtischek	4	3
(Sweden) C Allgårdh (Spain) J Avendaño	7	6
(United Kingdom) Stephen Charlery (Spain) F Luna	5	1
(Italy) C Pistolesi (Austria) H Skoff	2	4
4	(Argentina) M Ingaramo (West Germany) H Schwaier	6	6
WC	(Greece) K Efraimoglou (Greece) G Kalovelonis	7	3	2
(Socialist Federal Republic of Yugoslavia) B Orešar (West Germany) M Westphal	6	6	6
(Sweden) R Bergh (Sweden) P Henricsson	6	6
2	(United States) R Baxter (United States) T Siegel	3	1

Quarterfinals
(Spain) J Bardou (Spain) V Solves	3	4
(Peru) P Arraya (Czechoslovakia) K Nováček	6	6
3	(West Germany) W Popp (West Germany) U Riglewski	6	6
(Spain) J Aguilera (Spain) Joel Figueras	3	0
(Sweden) C Allgårdh (Spain) J Avendaño	6	0	5
4	(Argentina) M Ingaramo (West Germany) H Schwaier	3	6	7
(Socialist Federal Republic of Yugoslavia) B Orešar (West Germany) M Westphal	6	7	2
(Sweden) R Bergh (Sweden) P Henricsson	7	6	6

Semifinals
(Peru) P Arraya (Czechoslovakia) K Nováček	6	6
3	(West Germany) W Popp (West Germany) U Riglewski	4	1
4	(Argentina) M Ingaramo (West Germany) H Schwaier	0	6	4
(Sweden) R Bergh (Sweden) P Henricsson	6	3	6

Final
(Peru) P Arraya (Czechoslovakia) K Nováček	4	5
(Sweden) R Bergh (Sweden) P Henricsson	6	7
