= 1988 Athens Open – Singles =

Singles
- 1988 Athens Open

Final
- Champion: (Austria) Horst Skoff
- Runner-up: (Socialist Federal Republic of Yugoslavia) Bruno Orešar
- Score: 6–3, 2–6, 6–2

Details
- Draw: 32
- Seeds: 8

Events
Singles	Doubles
← 1987 ·	ATP Athens Open	· 1989 →

Guillermo Pérez Roldán was the defending champion, but did not participate this year.

Horst Skoff won the tournament, beating Bruno Orešar in the final, 6–3, 2–6, 6–2.

== Seeds ==
1. (West Germany) Tore Meinecke (second round)
2. (Argentina) Guillermo Vilas (second round)
3. (Spain) Fernando Luna (first round)
4. (Italy) Claudio Pistolesi (first round)
5. (Argentina) Christian Miniussi (first round)
6. (Socialist Federal Republic of Yugoslavia) Bruno Orešar (final)
7. (Spain) Alberto Tous (first round)
8. (Austria) Horst Skoff (champion)

== Draw ==
=== Key ===
- Q = Qualifier
- WC = Wild card
- LL = Lucky loser
- Alt = Alternate
- ITF = ITF entry
- PR = Protected ranking
- SR = Special ranking
- SE = Special exempt
- JE = Junior exempt
- JR = Junior Accelerator Programme entrant
- CO = College Accelerator Programme entrant
- NG = Next Gen Accelerator Program entrant
- w/o = Walkover
- r = Retired
- d = Defaulted

=== Finals ===
Semifinals
(Sweden) Christer Allgårdh	2	6
6	(Socialist Federal Republic of Yugoslavia) Bruno Orešar	6	7
(Peru) Pablo Arraya	4	1
8	(Austria) Horst Skoff	6	6

Final
6	(Socialist Federal Republic of Yugoslavia) Bruno Orešar	3	6	2
8	(Austria) Horst Skoff	6	2	6

=== Top half ===
First round
1	(West Germany) T Meinecke	6	6
(West Germany) U Riglewski	1	2
(West Germany) M Rackl	6	6
(Sweden) R Bergh	2	2
(Spain) J Aguilera	2	6	4
(Sweden) C Allgårdh	6	1	6
Q	(Brazil) E Furusho	6	6	7
7	(Spain) A Tous	2	7	5
3	(Spain) F Luna	2	6
(Portugal) N Marques	6	7
(Brazil) I Kley	4	7	2
(Czechoslovakia) K Nováček	6	6	6
(Spain) J Avendaño	6	6	7
Q	(Sweden) P Henricsson	3	7	6
(Argentina) M Ingaramo	7	2	6
6	(Socialist Federal Republic of Yugoslavia) B Orešar	6	6	7

Second round
1	(West Germany) T Meinecke	4	2
(West Germany) M Rackl	6	6
(Sweden) C Allgårdh	5	6	6
Q	(Brazil) E Furusho	7	2	2
(Portugal) N Marques	3	1
(Czechoslovakia) K Nováček	6	6
(Spain) J Avendaño	6	2	5
6	(Socialist Federal Republic of Yugoslavia) B Orešar	2	6	7

Quarterfinals
(West Germany) M Rackl	6	2	5
(Sweden) C Allgårdh	1	6	7
(Czechoslovakia) K Nováček	6	3	3
6	(Socialist Federal Republic of Yugoslavia) B Orešar	3	6	6

Semifinals
(Sweden) C Allgårdh	2	6
6	(Socialist Federal Republic of Yugoslavia) B Orešar	6	7

=== Bottom half ===
First round
5	(Argentina) C Miniussi	3	5
Q	(Spain) E Osta	6	7
(Peru) P Arraya	6	6
WC	(Greece) A Bavelas	3	1
(West Germany) H Schwaier	4	2
(West Germany) P Vojtischek	6	6
WC	(Greece) G Kalovelonis	7	6
4	(Italy) C Pistolesi	6	3
8	(Austria) H Skoff	7	6
(West Germany) W Popp	6	3
Q	(Spain) Joel Figueras	1	4
(West Germany) M Westphal	6	6
(Spain) T Carbonell	4	7	6
(Spain) J Bardou	6	5	1
(Argentina) F Yunis	2	6
2	(Argentina) G Vilas	6	7

Second round
Q	(Spain) E Osta	4	2
(Peru) P Arraya	6	6
(West Germany) P Vojtischek	7	6
WC	(Greece) G Kalovelonis	5	2
8	(Austria) H Skoff	7	6
(West Germany) M Westphal	6	1
(Spain) T Carbonell	7	7
2	(Argentina) G Vilas	5	6

Quarterfinals
(Peru) P Arraya	7	6
(West Germany) P Vojtischek	5	3
8	(Austria) H Skoff	6	6
(Spain) T Carbonell	2	2

Semifinals
(Peru) P Arraya	4	1
8	(Austria) H Skoff	6	6
