= 1987 Athens Open – Doubles =

Doubles
- 1987 Athens Open

Final
- Champions: (West Germany) Tore Meinecke (West Germany) Ricki Osterthun
- Runners-up: (Czechoslovakia) Jaroslav Navrátil (Netherlands) Tom Nijssen
- Score: 6–2, 3–6, 6–2

Events
Singles	Doubles
← 1986 ·	ATP Athens Open	· 1988 →

Libor Pimek and Blaine Willenborg were the defending champions, but did not participate this year.

Tore Meinecke and Ricki Osterthun won in the final 6–2, 3–6, 6–2, against Jaroslav Navrátil and Tom Nijssen.

== Seeds ==
1. (France) Loïc Courteau / (Spain) Alberto Tous (first round)
2. (Iran) Mansour Bahrami / (Uruguay) Diego Pérez (quarterfinals)
3. (Czechoslovakia) Jaroslav Navrátil / (Netherlands) Tom Nijssen (final)
4. (Italy) Claudio Panatta / (Austria) Horst Skoff (first round)

== Draw ==
=== Key ===
- Q = Qualifier
- WC = Wild card
- LL = Lucky loser
- Alt = Alternate
- SE = Special exempt
- PR = Protected ranking
- ITF = ITF entry
- JE = Junior exempt
- w/o = Walkover
- r = Retired
- d = Defaulted
- SR = Special ranking

=== Draw ===
First round
1	(France) L Courteau (Spain) A Tous	7	6	3
(West Germany) T Meinecke (West Germany) R Osterthun	6	7	6
(United States) J Brown (United States) R Brown	6	6
WC	(Argentina) F Davín (Argentina) G Pérez Roldán	4	3
4	(Italy) C Panatta (Austria) H Skoff	3	7	4
(Haiti) R Agénor (Chile) P Rebolledo	6	5	6
(Brazil) M Hennemann (Brazil) I Kley	6	7
(Greece) A Bavelas (Greece) G Kalovelonis	4	5
(France) T Champion (France) B Dadillon	4
(Spain) J Avendaño (Argentina) E Bengoechea	3^{r}
(France) T Benhabiles (Senegal) Y Doumbia	6	6	5
3	(Czechoslovakia) J Navrátil (Netherlands) T Nijssen	1	7	7
(Italy) O Camporese (Italy) E Rossi	6	6
(Italy) M Armellini (Italy) A Baldoni	4	2
(Peru) P Arraya (Spain) J Arrese	6	2
2	(Iran) M Bahrami (Uruguay) D Pérez	7	6

Quarterfinals
(West Germany) T Meinecke (West Germany) R Osterthun	6	6
(United States) J Brown (United States) R Brown	4	4
(Haiti) R Agénor (Chile) P Rebolledo	6	5
(Brazil) M Hennemann (Brazil) I Kley	7	7
(France) T Champion (France) B Dadillon
3	(Czechoslovakia) J Navrátil (Netherlands) T Nijssen	w/o
(Italy) O Camporese (Italy) E Rossi	1	7	6
2	(Iran) M Bahrami (Uruguay) D Pérez	6	6	4

Semifinals
(West Germany) T Meinecke (West Germany) R Osterthun	7	6
(Brazil) M Hennemann (Brazil) I Kley	6	3
3	(Czechoslovakia) J Navrátil (Netherlands) T Nijssen	4	7	6
(Italy) O Camporese (Italy) E Rossi	6	5	3

Final
(West Germany) T Meinecke (West Germany) R Osterthun	6	3	6
3	(Czechoslovakia) J Navrátil (Netherlands) T Nijssen	2	6	2
