= 1987 Athens Open – Singles =

Singles
- 1987 Athens Open

Final
- Champion: (Argentina) Guillermo Pérez Roldán
- Runner-up: (West Germany) Tore Meinecke
- Score: 6–2, 6–3

Details
- Draw: 32
- Seeds: 8

Events
| Singles | Doubles |
| ← 1986 · | ATP Athens Open | · 1988 → |

Henrik Sundström was the defending champion but did not participate this year.

Guillermo Pérez Roldán won the tournament, beating Tore Meinecke in the final, 6–2, 6–3.

== Seeds ==
1. (France) Tarik Benhabiles (first round)
2. (Austria) Horst Skoff (quarterfinals)
3. (Argentina) Eduardo Bengoechea (first round)
4. (Argentina) Guillermo Pérez Roldán (champion)
5. (Socialist Federal Republic of Yugoslavia) Marián Vajda (quarterfinals)
6. (Spain) Alberto Tous (second round)
7. (Haiti) Ronald Agénor (first round)
8. (Uruguay) Diego Pérez (second round)

== Draw ==
=== Key ===
- Q = Qualifier
- WC = Wild card
- LL = Lucky loser
- Alt = Alternate
- SE = Special exempt
- PR = Protected ranking
- ITF = ITF entry
- JE = Junior exempt
- w/o = Walkover
- r = Retired
- d = Defaulted
- SR = Special ranking

=== Finals ===
Semifinals
(West Germany) Tore Meinecke | 6 | 6
(Argentina) Francisco Yunis | 4 | 4
4 | (Argentina) Guillermo Pérez Roldán | 6 | 6 | 6
(West Germany) Paul Vojtischek | 7 | 4 | 2

Final
(West Germany) Tore Meinecke | 2 | 3
4 | (Argentina) Guillermo Pérez Roldán | 6 | 6

=== Top half ===
First round
1 | (France) T Benhabiles | 3 | 6 | 3
(Italy) C Pistolesi | 6 | 3 | 6
(West Germany) T Meinecke | 6 | 6
(Czechoslovakia) L Pimek | 1 | 0
Q | (Chile) P Rebolledo | 3 | 6 | 6
(Peru) P Arraya | 6 | 4 | 0
(Brazil) I Kley | 4 | 2
8 | (Uruguay) D Pérez | 6 | 6
3 | (Argentina) E Bengoechea | 4 | 0
(Spain) J Arrese | 6 | 6
(West Germany) R Osterthun | 3 | 3
(Czechoslovakia) J Navrátil | 6 | 6
(Netherlands) T Nijssen | 4 | 0
(Argentina) F Yunis | 6 | 6
(Argentina) F Davín | 6 | 1
6 | (Spain) A Tous | 7 | 6

Second round
(Italy) C Pistolesi | 2 | 2
(West Germany) T Meinecke | 6 | 6
Q | (Chile) P Rebolledo | 7 | 6
8 | (Uruguay) D Pérez | 6 | 0
(Spain) J Arrese | 6 | 4 | 6
(Czechoslovakia) J Navrátil | 2 | 6 | 7
(Argentina) F Yunis | 1 | 7 | 6
6 | (Spain) A Tous | 6 | 6 | 3

Quarterfinals
(West Germany) T Meinecke | 6 | 6 | 6
Q | (Chile) P Rebolledo | 1 | 7 | 3
(Czechoslovakia) J Navrátil | 3 | 5
(Argentina) F Yunis | 6 | 7

Semifinals
(West Germany) T Meinecke | 6 | 6
(Argentina) F Yunis | 4 | 4

=== Bottom half ===
First round
5 | (Czechoslovakia) M Vajda | 7 | 6
(United States) J Brown | 5 | 1
(Socialist Federal Republic of Yugoslavia) B Orešar | 7 | 6
WC | (Greece) A Bavelas | 6 | 2
Q | (Brazil) M Hennemann | 6 | 7 | 6
Q | (Iran) M Bahrami | 7 | 6 | 2
WC | (Greece) G Kalovelonis | 2 | 2
4 | (Argentina) G Pérez Roldán | 6 | 6
7 | (Haiti) R Agénor | 6 | 6 | 6
(West Germany) P Vojtischek | 7 | 4 | 7
(Spain) J Avendaño | 4 | 1
LL | (France) T Champion | 6 | 6
(Italy) F Cancellotti | 6 | 2 | 6
Q | (Spain) J Aguilera | 4 | 6 | 3
(Italy) C Panatta | 5 | 0
2 | (Austria) H Skoff | 7 | 6

Second round
5 | (Czechoslovakia) M Vajda | 6 | 7
(Socialist Federal Republic of Yugoslavia) B Orešar | 2 | 6
Q | (Brazil) M Hennemann | 4 | 2
4 | (Argentina) G Pérez Roldán | 6 | 6
(West Germany) P Vojtischek | 6 | 3
LL | (France) T Champion | 2 | 1^{r}
(Italy) F Cancellotti | 2 | 4
2 | (Austria) H Skoff | 6 | 6

Quarterfinals
5 | (Czechoslovakia) M Vajda | 4 | 4
4 | (Argentina) G Pérez Roldán | 6 | 6
(West Germany) P Vojtischek | 7 | 6
2 | (Austria) H Skoff | 6 | 4

Semifinals
4 | (Argentina) G Pérez Roldán | 6 | 6 | 6
(West Germany) P Vojtischek | 7 | 4 | 2
