= 1988 French Open – Men's singles =

Men's singles
- 1988 French Open

Final
- Champion: (Sweden) Mats Wilander
- Runner-up: (France) Henri Leconte
- Score: 7–5, 6–2, 6–1

Details
- Draw: 128
- Seeds: 16

Events
Singles	men	women		boys	girls
Doubles	men	women	mixed	boys	girls
WC Singles	men	women	quad
WC Doubles	men	women	quad
Legends	−45	45+	women
- French Open

Mats Wilander defeated Henri Leconte in the final, 7–5, 6–2, 6–1 to win the men's singles tennis title at the 1988 French Open. It was his third French Open title and sixth major singles title overall. Leconte remains the most recent Frenchman to reach the final.

Ivan Lendl was the two-time defending champion, but lost in the quarterfinals to Jonas Svensson.

== Seeds ==
The seeded players are listed below. Mats Wilander is the champion; others show the round in which they were eliminated.

1. (Czechoslovakia) Ivan Lendl (quarterfinals)
2. (Sweden) Stefan Edberg (fourth round)
3. (Sweden) Mats Wilander (champion)
4. (Australia) Pat Cash (fourth round)
5. (West Germany) Boris Becker (fourth round)
6. (France) Yannick Noah (fourth round)
7. (Sweden) Kent Carlsson (fourth round)
8. (United States) Tim Mayotte (second round)
9. (United States) Andre Agassi (semifinals)
10. (Sweden) Anders Järryd (first round)
11. (France) Henri Leconte (finalist)
12. (Spain) Emilio Sánchez (quarterfinals)
13. (Ecuador) Andrés Gómez (second round)
14. (Soviet Union) Andrei Chesnokov (quarterfinals)
15. (Argentina) Guillermo Pérez Roldán (quarterfinals)
16. (United States) John McEnroe (fourth round)

== Draw ==
Key

- Q = Qualifier
- WC = Wild card
- LL = Lucky loser
- Alt = Alternate
- ITF = ITF entry
- PR = Protected ranking
- SR = Special ranking
- SE = Special exempt
- JE = Junior exempt
- JR = Junior Accelerator Programme entrant
- CO = College Accelerator Programme entrant
- NG = Next Gen Accelerator Program entrant
- w/o = Walkover
- r = Retired
- d = Defaulted

=== Finals ===
Quarterfinals
1	(Czechoslovakia) Ivan Lendl	6	5	2
(Sweden) Jonas Svensson	7	7	6
14	(Soviet Union) Andrei Chesnokov	3	2	6
11	(France) Henri Leconte	6	6	7
12	(Spain) Emilio Sánchez	7^{7}	6^{3}	3	4
3	(Sweden) Mats Wilander	6^{5}	7^{7}	6	6
9	(United States) Andre Agassi	6	6	6
15	(Argentina) Guillermo Pérez Roldán	2	2	4

Semifinals
(Sweden) Jonas Svensson	6	2	3
11	(France) Henri Leconte	7	6	6
3	(Sweden) Mats Wilander	4	6	7	5	6
9	(United States) Andre Agassi	6	2	5	7	0

Final
11	(France) Henri Leconte	5	2	1
3	(Sweden) Mats Wilander	7	6	6

=== Section 1 ===
First round
1	(Czechoslovakia) I Lendl	6	6	6
WC	(France) P Pech	0	3	4
(Senegal) Y Doumbia	4	6	6	4
(Sweden) N Kroon	6	3	7	6
(Chile) P Rebolledo	2	2	6	4
(France) T Tulasne	6	6	3	6
Q	(West Germany) A Maurer	2	7	3	7	4
(West Germany) D Keretić	6	6	6	6	6
WC	(United States) M Chang	7	6	6
(United States) R Seguso	5	2	3
(Spain) S Casal	3	4	7	2
Q	(Sweden) T Svantesson	6	6	6	6
WC	(France) P Kuchna	2	4	3
(Sweden) C Bergström	6	6	6
(Soviet Union) A Volkov	6	1	6
16	(United States) J McEnroe	7	6	7

Second round
1	(Czechoslovakia) I Lendl	6	6	6
(Sweden) N Kroon	4	0	1
(France) T Tulasne	6	6	6
(West Germany) D Keretić	1	4	3
WC	(United States) M Chang	6	6	6
Q	(Sweden) T Svantesson	4	1	3
(Sweden) C Bergström	2	4	3
16	(United States) J McEnroe	6	6	6

Third round
1	(Czechoslovakia) I Lendl	6	7	6
(France) T Tulasne	3	6	2
WC	(United States) M Chang	0	3	1
16	(United States) J McEnroe	6	6	6

Fourth round
1	(Czechoslovakia) I Lendl	6	7	6	6
16	(United States) J McEnroe	7	6	4	4

=== Section 2 ===
First round
10	(Sweden) A Järryd	4	5	1
(Sweden) J Nyström	6	7	6
WC	(France) É Winogradsky	0	2	7	5
(United States) J Berger	6	6	6	7
(Canada) C Pridham	2	7	3	3
(France) T Champion	6	6	6	6
(Sweden) J Svensson	6	6	6
(Argentina) C Miniussi	4	2	2
(West Germany) P Vojtíšek	4	0	1
Q	(Brazil) C Motta	6	6	6
(Peru) J Yzaga	4	3	3
(Argentina) M Jaite	6	6	6
(Italy) C Pistolesi	4	3	3
WC	(France) J Potier	6	6	6
(Argentina) F Davín	6	4	4	4
7	(Sweden) K Carlsson	4	6	6	6

Second round
(Sweden) J Nyström	7	6	6
(United States) J Berger	5	3	0
(France) T Champion	2	6	2	3
(Sweden) J Svensson	6	3	6	6
Q	(Brazil) C Motta	6	5	1	6
(Argentina) M Jaite	3	7	6	7
WC	(France) J Potier	3	1	1
7	(Sweden) K Carlsson	6	6	6

Third round
(Sweden) J Nyström	7	4	6	3	2
(Sweden) J Svensson	6	6	4	6	6
(Argentina) M Jaite	2	3	1
7	(Sweden) K Carlsson	6	6	6

Fourth round
(Sweden) J Svensson	5	7	1	6	6
7	(Sweden) K Carlsson	7	6	6	4	2

=== Section 3 ===
First round
4	(Australia) P Cash	6	6	6
(United States) J Brown	3	1	1
(Australia) J Fitzgerald	3	5	4
(Spain) J Sánchez	6	7	6
(Czechoslovakia) L Pimek	4	4	4
(Australia) M Woodforde	6	6	6
(West Germany) C Steeb	6	1	2	3
(Spain) J Arrese	3	6	6	6
Q	(Mexico) L Lavalle	2	3	2
(Argentina) G Vilas	6	6	6
(Australia) D Cahill	7	6	7	2	3
(Argentina) E Bengoechea	6	7	5	6	6
(United States) R Reneberg	6	6	4	6
Q	(Sweden) D Engel	4	2	6	3
(Australia) J Frawley	2	4	6
14	(Soviet Union) A Chesnokov	6	6	7

Second round
4	(Australia) P Cash	6	3	4	6	6
(Spain) J Sánchez	3	6	6	2	3
(Australia) M Woodforde	6	6	5	4	6
(Spain) J Arrese	4	3	7	6	4
(Argentina) G Vilas	3	6	5	0
(Argentina) E Bengoechea	6	4	7	6
(United States) R Reneberg	4	3	6	3
14	(Soviet Union) A Chesnokov	6	6	4	6

Third round
4	(Australia) P Cash	4	6	6	6
(Australia) M Woodforde	6	2	1	2
(Argentina) E Bengoechea	1	6	4	0
14	(Soviet Union) A Chesnokov	6	4	6	6

Fourth round
4	(Australia) P Cash	6	2	4	3
14	(Soviet Union) A Chesnokov	2	6	6	6

=== Section 4 ===
First round
11	(France) H Leconte	6	4	6	6	6
Q	(Australia) S Youl	3	6	7	4	3
Q	(Socialist Federal Republic of Yugoslavia) B Orešar	6	4	6	4	9
(Austria) H Skoff	2	6	4	6	7
(Argentina) H de la Peña	6	6	6
(West Germany) E Jelen	2	2	1
(United States) J Grabb	4	6	6	3
(United States) M Davis	6	3	7	6
Q	(France) S Grenier	4	4	6	6
Q	(Brazil) M Hennemann	6	6	2	7
(Austria) T Muster	6	6	6
(United States) K Flach	0	1	2
(United States) L Duncan	6	3	3
(Czechoslovakia) P Korda	7	6	6
(Switzerland) C Mezzadri	4	2	5
5	(West Germany) B Becker	6	6	7

Second round
11	(France) H Leconte	6	6	6	1	6
Q	(Socialist Federal Republic of Yugoslavia) B Orešar	1	0	7	6	2
(Argentina) H de la Peña	4	6	6	6
(United States) M Davis	6	3	1	1
Q	(Brazil) M Hennemann	1	0	2
(Austria) T Muster	6	6	6
(Czechoslovakia) P Korda	4	3	4
5	(West Germany) B Becker	6	6	6

Third round
11	(France) H Leconte	6	7	6
(Argentina) H de la Peña	4	5	1
(Austria) T Muster	1	6	5	3
5	(West Germany) B Becker	6	4	7	6

Fourth round
11	(France) H Leconte	6	6	6	5	6
5	(West Germany) B Becker	7	3	1	7	4

=== Section 5 ===
First round
6	(France) Y Noah	7	6	6
(West Germany) R Osterthun	6	1	4
(Brazil) L Mattar	6	6	6
(Sweden) M Pernfors	4	2	1
(United States) T Witsken	6	6	6
(Czechoslovakia) B Stankovic	4	0	3
(Switzerland) J Hlasek	6	7	6
WC	(France) G Raoux	1	6	1
(France) G Forget	7	6	6
(Sweden) P Lundgren	6	3	4
Q	(Uruguay) M Filippini	6	7	6
(United States) J Ross	4	5	3
(United States) J Pugh	6	6	6
(Czechoslovakia) T Šmid	3	1	3
Q	(Iran) M Bahrami	1	5	3
12	(Spain) E Sánchez	6	7	6

Second round
6	(France) Y Noah	6	6	4	7
(Brazil) L Mattar	2	4	6	6
(United States) T Witsken	6	1	3
(Switzerland) J Hlasek	7	6	6
(France) G Forget	7	6	6
Q	(Uruguay) M Filippini	5	3	1
(United States) J Pugh	1	4	2
12	(Spain) E Sánchez	6	6	6

Third round
6	(France) Y Noah	6	6	6	6
(Switzerland) J Hlasek	4	4	7	3
(France) G Forget	4	4	6	4
12	(Spain) E Sánchez	6	6	3	6

Fourth round
6	(France) Y Noah	6	3	7	2	2
12	(Spain) E Sánchez	4	6	6	6	6

=== Section 6 ===
First round
13	(Ecuador) A Gómez	7	6	4	4	6
(Sweden) U Stenlund	6	0	6	6	4
(Haiti) R Agénor	7	6	6
(United States) J Arias	6	2	4
(Czechoslovakia) M Vajda	3	6	6	7
(Australia) W Masur	6	4	4	6
WC	(France) T Benhabiles	3	3	4
(United States) P Annacone	6	6	6
(Spain) A Tous	6	6	1	5	6
(India) R Krishnan	4	2	6	7	4
(Socialist Federal Republic of Yugoslavia) S Živojinović	6	7	2	6
(United States) A Krickstein	4	5	6	4
Q	(Spain) E Osta	2	4	6	3
Q	(Argentina) F Yunis	6	6	2	6
(Czechoslovakia) J Čihák	5	5	1
3	(Sweden) M Wilander	7	7	6

Second round
13	(Ecuador) A Gómez	4	6	4	6
(Haiti) R Agénor	6	4	6	7
(Czechoslovakia) M Vajda	4	6	6	5	2
(United States) P Annacone	6	1	2	7	6
(Spain) A Tous	5	7	1	4
(Socialist Federal Republic of Yugoslavia) S Živojinović	7	6	6	6
Q	(Argentina) F Yunis	2	3	1
3	(Sweden) M Wilander	6	6	6

Third round
(Haiti) R Agénor	6	7	6
(United States) P Annacone	4	6	2
(Socialist Federal Republic of Yugoslavia) S Živojinović	2	7	6	3	5
3	(Sweden) M Wilander	6	6	3	6	7

Fourth round
(Haiti) R Agénor	1	6	3
3	(Sweden) M Wilander	6	7	6

=== Section 7 ===
First round
8	(United States) T Mayotte	6	6	6
Q	(Australia) C Limberger	1	1	4
(Czechoslovakia) M Šrejber	5	0	3
(Sweden) M Gustafsson	7	6	6
(United Kingdom) J Bates	6	2	6	7
Q	(Australia) T Woodbridge	4	6	2	6
(Italy) F Cancellotti	6	6	6
(Netherlands) M Schapers	4	2	2
Q	(Soviet Union) A Võsand	6	6	6
(Netherlands) M Oosting	4	1	1
(Australia) B Dyke	4	3	5
(Mexico) J Lozano	6	6	7
(United States) J Rive	5	2	2
(Italy) M Narducci	7	6	6
(Italy) P Canè	4	1	2
9	(United States) A Agassi	6	6	6

Second round
8	(United States) T Mayotte	6	4	4
(Sweden) M Gustafsson	7	6	6
(United Kingdom) J Bates	6	4	7	3	7
(Italy) F Cancellotti	3	6	5	6	5
Q	(Soviet Union) A Võsand	6	6	6
(Mexico) J Lozano	0	3	3
(Italy) M Narducci	1	2	2
9	(United States) A Agassi	6	6	6

Third round
(Sweden) M Gustafsson	6	6	6
(United Kingdom) J Bates	2	4	2
Q	(Soviet Union) A Võsand	5	3	2
9	(United States) A Agassi	7	6	6

Fourth round
(Sweden) M Gustafsson	4	2	6	0
9	(United States) A Agassi	6	6	4	6

=== Section 8 ===
First round
15	(Argentina) G Pérez Roldán	6	7	2	6
(Argentina) A Mancini	3	5	6	4
(West Germany) P Baur	4	3	4
(West Germany) T Meinecke	6	6	6
(Belgium) E Masso	6	4	6	1
(Israel) A Mansdorf	4	6	3	0	r
(France) J Fleurian	2	2	6
(West Germany) P Kühnen	6	6	7
(United States) D Cassidy	4	2	5
(Sweden) J Gunnarsson	6	6	7
(Czechoslovakia) J Navrátil	5	0	2
(West Germany) C Saceanu	7	6	6
(United States) M Purcell	4	1	6	5
WC	(France) A Boetsch	6	6	2	7
(Czechoslovakia) K Nováček	6	3	2	2
2	(Sweden) S Edberg	4	6	6	6

Second round
15	(Argentina) G Pérez Roldán	6	6	6
(West Germany) T Meinecke	2	2	0
(Belgium) E Masso	6	3	4
(West Germany) P Kühnen	7	6	6
(Sweden) J Gunnarsson	7	6	7
(West Germany) C Saceanu	6	3	6
WC	(France) A Boetsch	0	4	3
2	(Sweden) S Edberg	6	6	6

Third round
15	(Argentina) G Pérez-Roldán	6	6	6
(West Germany) P Kühnen	2	3	2
(Sweden) J Gunnarsson	3	4	6
2	(Sweden) S Edberg	6	6	7

Fourth round
15	(Argentina) G Pérez Roldán	7	6	6
2	(Sweden) S Edberg	5	3	3

Preceded by 1988 Australian Open – Men's singles	Grand Slam men's singles	Succeeded by 1988 Wimbledon Championships – Men's singles
