= 1987 Athens Open =

- Date: 15–22 June
- Edition: 2nd
- Category: Grand Prix
- Draw: 32S / 16D
- Prize money: $100,000
- Surface: Clay / outdoor
- Location: Athens, Greece

Champions

Singles
- (Argentina) Guillermo Pérez Roldán

Doubles
- (West Germany) Tore Meinecke / (West Germany) Ricki Osterthun
← 1986 ·	ATP Athens Open	· 1988 →

The 1987 Athens Open was a men's tennis tournament played on outdoor clay courts in Athens in Greece that was part of the 1987 Nabisco Grand Prix. It was the second edition of the tournament and was held from 15 June until 22 June 1987. Fourth-seeded Guillermo Pérez Roldán won the singles title.

== Finals ==
=== Singles ===
(Argentina) Guillermo Pérez Roldán defeated (West Germany) Tore Meinecke 6–2, 6–3

- It was Pérez-Roldán's 2nd singles title of the year and of his career.

=== Doubles ===
(West Germany) Tore Meinecke / (West Germany) Ricki Osterthun defeated (Czechoslovakia) Jaroslav Navrátil / (Netherlands) Tom Nijssen 6–2, 3–6, 6–2

- It was Meinecke's only title of the year and the 1st of his career. It was Osterthun's only title of the year and the 2nd of his career.

== See also ==
- 1987 Athens Trophy – women's tournament
