= Lamboglia =

Lamboglia is a surname. Notable people with the surname include:

- Nino Lamboglia (1912–1977), Italian archaeologist
- Rodolfo Lamboglia, Argentine film producer
