= Eduardo Furusho =

Brazilian tennis player

- Country (sports): Brazil; Japan
- Born: 6 July 1968 (age 57); São Paulo, Brazil
- Height: 5 ft 6 in (168 cm)
- Plays: Left-handed
- Prize money: $43,441

Singles
- Career record: 1–3
- Highest ranking: No. 314 (10 September 1990)

Grand Slam singles results
- Australian Open: Q2 (1991, 1993)

Doubles
- Career record: 6–15
- Highest ranking: No. 183 (26 August 1991)

Eduardo Furusho (born 6 July 1968) is a Brazilian former professional tennis player of Japanese descent. He is also known as Daijiro Furusho.

Born in São Paulo, Furusho began playing tennis at the age of nine and turned professional in 1987.

Furusho, a left-handed player, made the second round of the 1988 Athens Open but made most of his Grand Prix/ATP Tour main draw appearances as a doubles player.

In the 1990s he switched his nationality and played in three Davis Cup ties for Japan, under the name Daijiro Furusho.

== Challenger titles ==
=== Doubles: (1) ===
Year	Tournament	Surface	Partner	Opponents	Score
1989	Genova, Italy	Clay	(France) Tarik Benhabiles	(Italy) Emilio Marturano (Italy) Fabio Melegari	6–2, 6–2

== See also ==
- List of Japan Davis Cup team representatives
