= International Tennis Tournament of Messina =

Messina Challenger

ATP Challenger Tour
- Event name: Messina Challenger
- Sponsor: Hamilton Sportwear
- Founded: 1980
- Abolished: 1991
- Editions: 12
- Location: Messina, Italy
- Category: ATP Challenger Tour
- Surface: Clay
- Draw: 32S
- Prize money: $100,000 (in 1991)

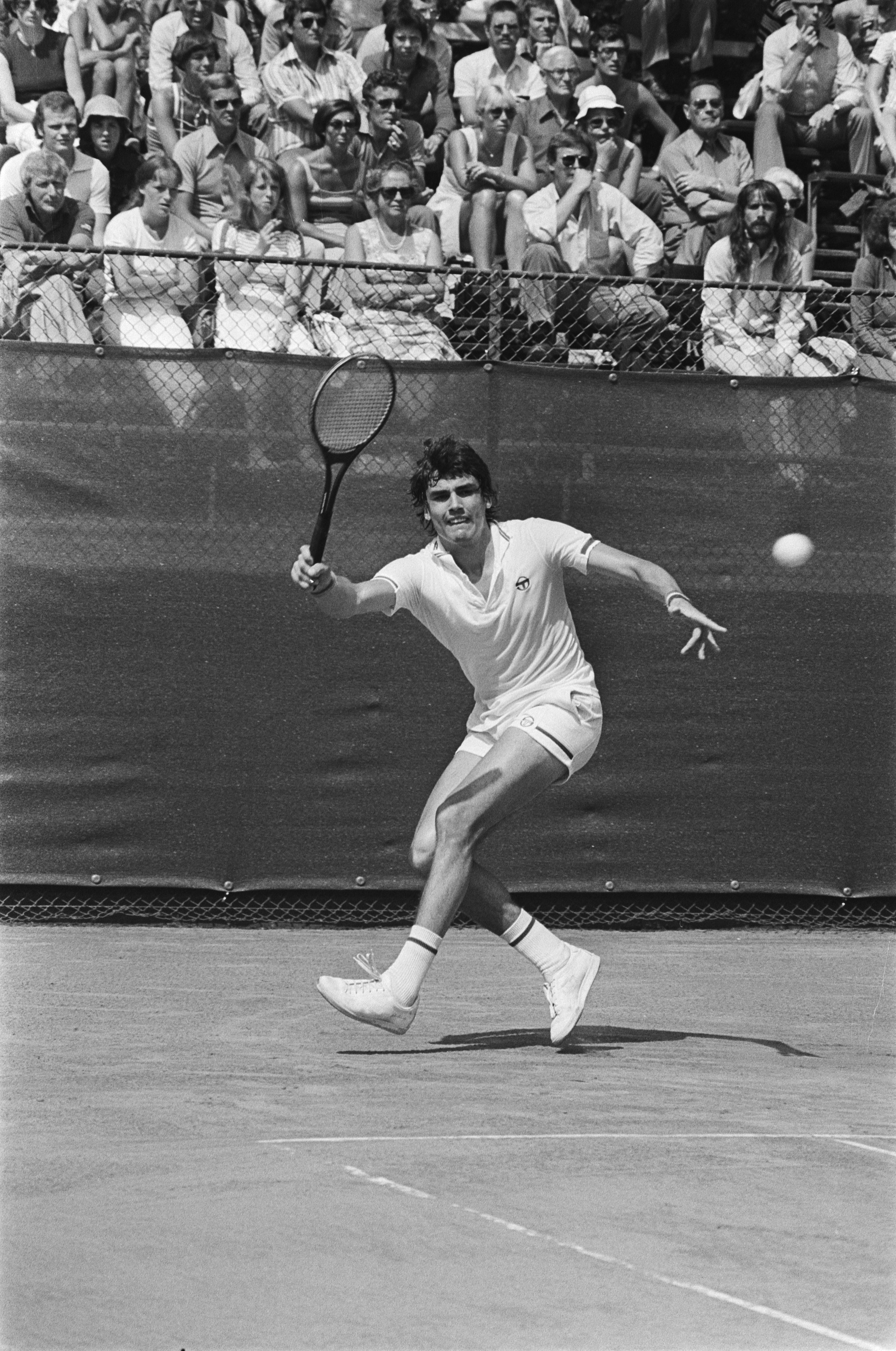
Víctor Pecci won the tournament in 1984 when he was 15th in the ATP rankings.

The International Tennis Tournament of Messina (also known as Torneo Hamilton) was a tennis tournament held annually in Messina, Italy. Held for 12 editions in the 1980s, the tournament was played on outdoor clay courts and was a part of the ATP Challenger Tour schedule from 1980 to 1991.

== History ==
The tournament of Messina was part of the ATP Challenger Tour circuit in 1980s.

Many important players have played in Messina, such as Víctor Pecci and Guillermo Pérez Roldán, who won the championships when he was number 15 in the ATP world Rankings.

== Editions ==
Ed.	Date	Prize money	Winner	Note
I	24 September 1980	$25,000	(Sweden) Anders Järryd	
II	7 September 1981	$25,000	(Bolivia) Mario Martinez	
III	6 September 1982	$50,000	(Peru) Pablo Arraya	
IV	5 September 1983	$50,000	(Bolivia) Mario Martinez	
V	3 September 1984	$50,000	(Paraguay) Víctor Pecci	
VI	2 September 1985	$50,000	(Sweden) Kent Carlsson	
VII	1 September 1986	$50,000	(France) Tarik Benhabiles	
VIII	5 October 1987	$50,000	(West Germany) Hans Schwaier	
IX	12 September 1988	$50,000	(Italy) Claudio Panatta	
X	18 September 1989	$50,000	(Switzerland) Marc Rosset	
XI	17 September 1990	$100,000	(Argentina) Guillermo Pérez Roldán	
XII	16 September 1991	$100,000	(Italy) Massimo Valeri	
