= Ramesh Krishnan =

Indian tennis player

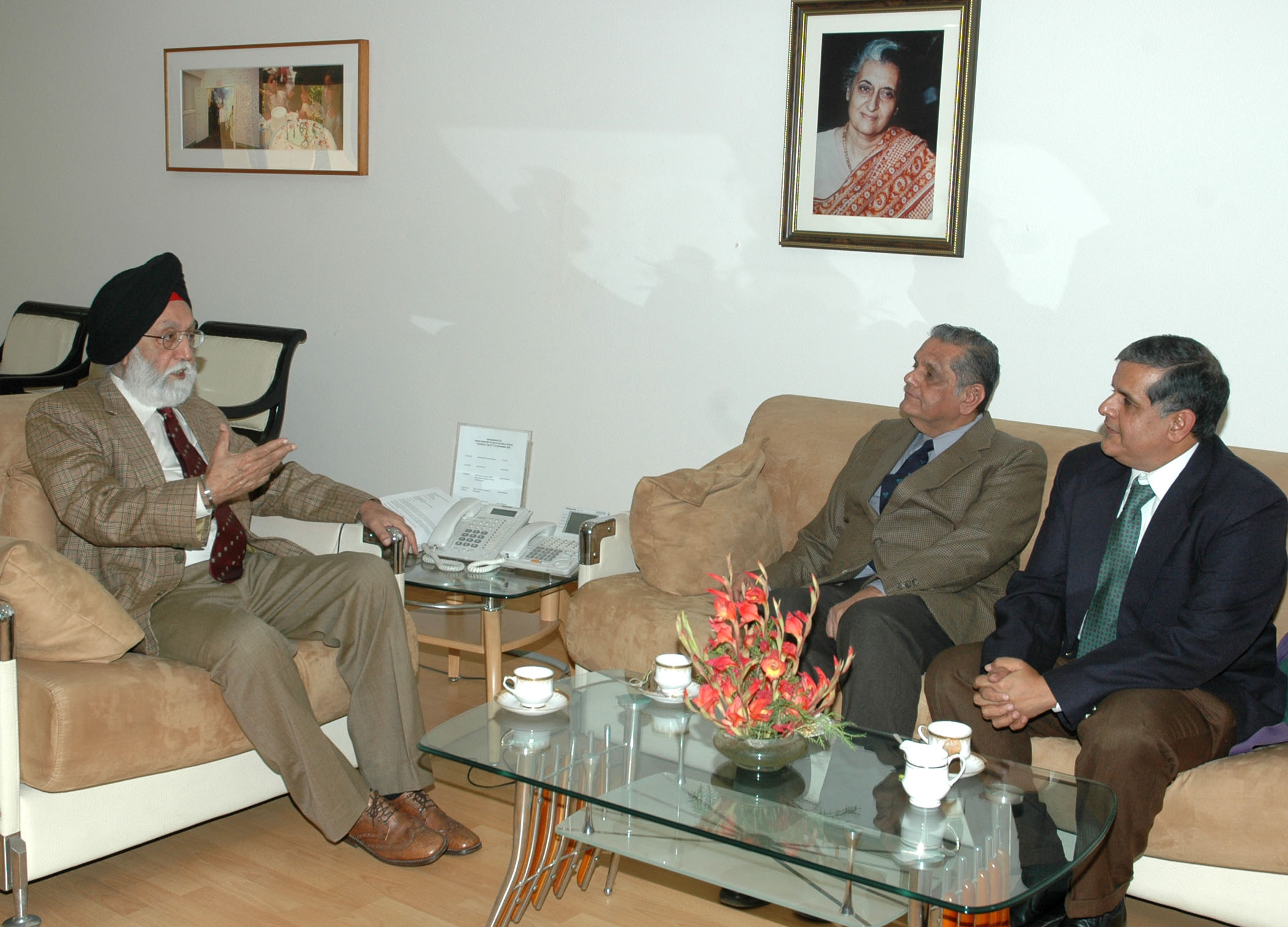
- Ramanathan Krishnan and Ramesh Krishnan called on the Union Minister of Youth Affairs and Sports, Dr. M.S. Gill, in New Delhi, 26 November 2009.
- Country (sports): India
- Residence: Madras, India
- Born: 5 June 1961 (age 65) Madras, India
- Height: 1.70 m (5 ft 7 in)
- Turned pro: 1978
- Retired: 1993
- Plays: Right-handed (one-handed backhand)
- Prize money: $1,262,330

Singles
- Career record: 319–285
- Career titles: 8
- Highest ranking: No. 23 (28 January 1985)

Grand Slam singles results
- Australian Open: 3R (1983, 1984, 1987, 1988, 1989)
- French Open: 3R (1982)
- Wimbledon: QF (1986)
- US Open: QF (1981, 1987)

Doubles
- Career record: 36–69
- Career titles: 1
- Highest ranking: No. 114 (14 September 1987)

Grand Slam doubles results
- Australian Open: 2R (1988)
- French Open: 1R (1979, 1981)
- Wimbledon: Q1 (1978, 1979)
- US Open: 2R (1987)

Other doubles tournaments
- Olympic Games: QF (1992)

Team competitions
- Davis Cup: F (1987)
- Last updated on: 24 August 2022.

Ramesh Krishnan (Hindi pronunciation: [rəmeːʃ kr̩ʂɳən]; born 5 June 1961) is an Indian tennis coach and former professional tennis player. As a junior player in the late 1970s, he won the singles titles at both, Wimbledon and the French Open. He went on to reach three Grand Slam quarterfinals in the 1980s and was a part of the Indian team captained by Vijay Amritraj which reached the final of the Davis Cup in 1987 against Sweden. Krishnan also beat then-world No. 1, Mats Wilander, at the 1989 Australian Open. He became India's Davis Cup captain in 2007.

== Early life ==
Ramesh was born in Madras, India, and is the son of Ramanathan Krishnan who reached the Wimbledon semifinal twice in the 1960s. Ramesh emulated an achievement of his father's by winning the Wimbledon junior title in 1979. He also won the French Open junior title that year, achieving what would be called Junior Channel Slam, and was ranked the No. 1 junior player in the world.

== Career ==
At the senior level, Ramesh reached the quarterfinals at Wimbledon once (1986) and the US Open twice (1981 and 1987). He was admired for his touch, anticipation and all-round game, but his lack of a killer stroke or a strong service kept him from reaching the very top of the men's game.

Ramesh was a key member of the Indian team which reached the Davis Cup final in 1987. In the semifinals against Australia, played on grass he beat John Fitzgerald in four sets the opening singles match, and then defeated Wally Masur in straight sets the decisive fifth rubber to give India a 3–2 victory. However, in the final against Sweden, which was played on clay, an unfavorable surface for the Indian team, India was defeated 5–0 with Krishnan losing two singles matches to Mats Wilander and Anders Järryd and with the Indian team managing to win only one set. Ramesh was a stalwart on India's Davis Cup team from 1977 to 1993, compiling a 29–21 winning record (23–19 in singles and 6–2 in doubles).

At the 1992 Olympic Games in Barcelona, Ramesh reached the men's doubles quarterfinals partnering Leander Paes.

Ramesh retired from the professional tour in 1993. Over the course of his career, he won eight top-level singles titles and one doubles title; he also won four challenger singles titles (defeating the teenage Andre Agassi in the Schenectady final in 1986). His career-high singles ranking was world No. 23, in January 1985.

In 1998, Ramesh was awarded the Padma Shri by the Government of India in recognition of his achievements and contributions to Indian tennis.

Ramesh runs a tennis academy in Chennai, set up along the lines of similar institutions in the United States. He became India Davis Cup team captain in January 2007.

== ATP career finals ==
=== Singles: 12 (8 titles / 4 runner-ups) ===
Legend Grand Slam Tournaments (0–0) ATP World Tour Finals (0–0) ATP Masters 1000 Series (0–0) ATP 500 Series (0–0) ATP 250 Series (8–4)	Finals by surface Hard (5–2) Clay (1–0) Grass (0–1) Carpet (2–1)	Finals by setting Outdoors (6–3) Indoors (2–1)

Result	W–L	Date	Tournament	Tier	Surface	Opponent	Score
Win	1–0	Nov 1981	Manila, Philippines	Grand Prix	Carpet	(Switzerland) Ivan Dupasquier	6–4, 6–4
Win	2–0	Jul 1982	Stuttgart, West Germany	Grand Prix	Clay	(United States) Sandy Mayer	5–7, 6–3, 6–3, 7–6^{(8–6)}
Win	3–0	Mar 1984	Metz, France	Grand Prix	Carpet	(Sweden) Jan Gunnarsson	6–3, 6–3
Loss	3–1	Oct 1985	Cologne, West Germany	Grand Prix	Carpet	(Sweden) Peter Lundgren	3–6, 2–6
Win	4–1	Oct 1986	Tokyo Outdoor, Japan	Grand Prix	Hard	(Sweden) Johan Carlsson	6–3, 6–1
Win	5–1	Nov 1986	Hong Kong, Hong Kong	Grand Prix	Hard	(Ecuador) Andres Gomez	7–6^{(9–7)}, 6–0, 7–5
Win	6–1	Jan 1988	Wellington, New Zealand	Grand Prix	Hard	(Soviet Union) Andrei Chesnokov	6–7^{(7–9)}, 6–0, 6–4, 6–3
Loss	6–2	Jan 1988	Auckland, New Zealand	Grand Prix	Hard	(Israel) Amos Mansdorf	3–6, 4–6
Loss	6–3	Jun 1988	Bristol, United Kingdom	Grand Prix	Grass	(Germany) Christian Saceanu	4–6, 6–2, 2–6
Loss	6–4	Aug 1988	Rye Brook, United States	Grand Prix	Hard	(Czech Republic) Milan Srejber	2–6, 6–7^{(4–7)}
Win	7–4	Jan 1989	Auckland, New Zealand	Grand Prix	Hard	(Israel) Amos Mansdorf	6–4, 6–0
Win	8–4	Aug 1990	Schenectady, United States	World Series	Hard	(New Zealand) Kelly Evernden	6–1, 6–1

=== Doubles: 1 (1 title) ===
Legend Grand Slam Tournaments (0–0) ATP World Tour Finals (0–0) ATP Masters 1000 Series (0–0) ATP 500 Series (0–0) ATP 250 Series (1–0)	Finals by surface Hard (0–0) Clay (0–0) Grass (0–0) Carpet (1–0)	Finals by setting Outdoors (0–0) Indoors (1–0)

Result	W–L	Date	Tournament	Tier	Surface	Partner	Opponents	Score
Win	1–0	Mar 1987	Nancy, France	Grand Prix	Carpet	(Switzerland) Claudio Mezzadri	(Canada) Grant Connell (United States) Larry Scott	6–4, 6–4

== ATP Challenger and ITF Futures finals ==
=== Singles: 4 (4–0) ===
Legend ATP Challenger (4–0) ITF Futures (0–0)	Finals by surface Hard (4–0) Clay (0–0) Grass (0–0) Carpet (0–0)

Result	W–L	Date	Tournament	Tier	Surface	Opponent	Score
Win	1–0	Jul 1986	Schenectady, United States	Challenger	Hard	(United States) Andre Agassi	6–2, 6–3
Win	2–0	Apr 1987	Nagoya, Japan	Challenger	Hard	(United States) Jay Lapidus	6–3, 6–0
Win	3–0	Apr 1989	Nagoya, Japan	Challenger	Hard	(United States) Jonathan Canter	6–1, 6–3
Win	4–0	Apr 1990	Nagoya, Japan	Challenger	Hard	(United States) Brian Garrow	6–2, 6–4

=== Doubles: 1 (0–1) ===
Legend ATP Challenger (0–1) ITF Futures (0–0)	Finals by surface Hard (0–1) Clay (0–0) Grass (0–0) Carpet (0–0)

Result	W–L	Date	Tournament	Tier	Surface	Partner	Opponents	Score
Loss	0–1	Apr 1989	Nagoya, Japan	Challenger	Hard	(United States) Jonathan Canter	(United States) John Letts (United States) Bruce Man-Son-Hing	5–7, 6–4, 0–6

== Junior Grand Slam finals ==
=== Singles: 2 (2 titles) ===
Result	Year	Tournament	Surface	Opponent	Score
Win	1979	French Open	Clay	(United States) Ben Testerman	2–6, 6–1, 6–0
Win	1979	Wimbledon	Grass	(United States) David Siegler	6–0, 6–2

== Performance timeline ==
Key
W	F	SF	QF	#R	RR	Q#	DNQ	A	NH

(W) winner; (F) finalist; (SF) semifinalist; (QF) quarterfinalist; (#R) rounds 4, 3, 2, 1; (RR) round-robin stage; (Q#) qualification round; (DNQ) did not qualify; (A) absent; (NH) not held; (SR) strike rate (events won / competed); (W–L) win–loss record.

=== Singles ===
Tournament	1978	1979	1980	1981	1982	1983	1984	1985	1986	1987	1988	1989	1990	1991	1992	1993	SR	W–L	Win %
Grand Slam tournaments
Australian Open	A	1R	A	A	A	3R	3R	A	A	3R	3R	3R	2R	2R	A	A	0 / 8	9–8	53%
French Open	A	2R	A	1R	3R	1R	1R	A	1R	A	1R	A	1R	A	A	Q1	0 / 8	3–8	27%
Wimbledon	Q3	1R	3R	A	3R	1R	3R	3R	QF	2R	2R	1R	2R	A	Q1	Q1	0 / 11	15–11	58%
US Open	A	2R	2R	QF	1R	1R	2R	1R	3R	QF	2R	1R	1R	1R	Q1	Q3	0 / 13	14–13	52%
Win–loss	0–0	2–4	3–2	4–2	4–3	1–4	4–4	2–2	6–3	6–3	4–4	2–3	2–4	1–2	0–0	0–0	0 / 40	41–40	51%
ATP Masters Series
Indian Wells	A	A	A	A	A	A	A	A	A	1R	1R	1R	1R	A	A	A	0 / 4	0–4	0%
Miami	A	A	A	A	A	A	A	A	A	2R	4R	3R	2R	2R	2R	3R	0 / 7	10–7	59%
Monte Carlo	A	A	A	A	1R	A	A	A	A	A	A	A	A	A	A	A	0 / 1	0–1	0%
Hamburg	A	A	A	1R	1R	A	A	A	A	A	A	A	A	A	A	A	0 / 2	0–2	0%
Rome	A	A	A	1R	A	A	1R	A	2R	A	A	A	A	A	A	A	0 / 3	1–3	25%
Canada	A	A	A	QF	3R	2R	A	QF	2R	2R	1R	A	3R	1R	Q2	A	0 / 9	13–9	59%
Cincinnati	A	A	A	2R	2R	1R	3R	1R	1R	2R	2R	3R	1R	1R	A	A	0 / 11	8–11	42%
Win–loss	0–0	0–0	0–0	4–4	3–4	1–2	2–2	3–2	2–3	3–4	4–4	4–3	3–4	1–3	1–1	1–1	0 / 37	32–37	0%

== Career highlights ==
- 1979 – Wimbledon and French Open junior singles champion.
- 1981 – Reached the quarterfinals of the US Open.
- 1981 – Won his first ATP singles title in Manila.
- 1986 – Reached the quarterfinals of Wimbledon.
- 1986 – Won the Japan Open.
- 1987 – Reached the quarterfinals of 1987 South Australian Open and 1987 Heineken Open in back to back weeks in January.
- 1987 – Reached the quarterfinals of the US Open.
- 1987 – Member of the Indian team which reached the final of the Davis Cup. (Krishnan won the decisive singles rubber against Australia in the semifinals. India went on to lose to Sweden in the final.)
- 1988 – Won the Wellington Open; runner-up in the ATP Auckland Open, Bristol Open and Rye Brook (New York) Open.
- 1989 – Defeated the then world No. 1, Mats Wilander, in the second round of the Australian Open.
- 1989 – Won the Auckland Open, reached the quarterfinals of the Schenectady Open and Washington DC Open in back to back weeks in July. He reached the quarterfinals of the 1989 Livingston Open.
- 1990 – Won the Schenectady Open and reached the semifinals of the 1990 Heineken Open.
- 1991 – Reached the quarterfinals of the Wellington Open.
- 1992 – Reached the semifinals of the Singapore Open.
- 1992 – Reached the quarterfinals of the men's doubles competition at the 1992 Summer Olympics in Barcelona with Leander Paes.
