= Christer Allgårdh =

Swedish tennis player

- Country (sports): Sweden
- Residence: Västerås, Sweden
- Born: 20 February 1967 (age 59) Borås, Sweden
- Height: 1.91 m (6 ft 3 in)
- Turned pro: 1983
- Plays: Right-handed
- Prize money: $231,280

Singles
- Career record: 14–24
- Career titles: 0
- Highest ranking: No. 101 (3 October 1988)

Grand Slam singles results
- French Open: Q3 (1993)

Doubles
- Career record: 30–39
- Career titles: 2
- Highest ranking: No. 91 (19 July 1993)

Grand Slam doubles results
- French Open: 1R (1993)
- Wimbledon: 1R (1993)

Christer Allgårdh (born 20 February 1967) is a Swedish former professional tennis player.

== Career ==
Allgårdh won the doubles event at the 1982 Junior Orange Bowl, with Bruno Orešar of Yugoslavia. Back home in Sweden he was a national junior champion in 1979, 1981 and 1985.

On the ATP Tour, Allgårdh was most prominent as a doubles player and won a tournament in his first ever Grand Prix appearance, at Bari in 1987. He won his second title in 1992, teaming up with Carl Limberger in the Guarujá Open. The Swede was also a finalist in two other events, but was unable to add any more titles.

As a singles player he had his best result in the 1988 Athens Open, where he reached the semi-finals.

He took part in the main draw of two Grand Slams during his career, both in 1993 and in doubles. At the French Open that year, Allgårdh played beside Sander Groen and they lost in the opening round. Although he also failed to get past the first round in the 1993 Wimbledon Championships, this time partnering Maurice Ruah, the pair were able to push third seeds Patrick McEnroe and Jonathan Stark to five sets, eventually losing 8–10 in the decider.

== Grand Prix/ATP career finals ==
=== Doubles: 4 (2–2) ===
Result	W/L	Date	Tournament	Surface	Partner	Opponents	Score
Win	1–0	Apr 1987	Bari, Italy	Clay	(Sweden) Ulf Stenlund	(Argentina) Roberto Azar (Argentina) Marcelo Ingaramo	6–3, 6–3
Win	2–0	Oct 1992	Guarujá, Brazil	Hard	(Australia) Carl Limberger	(Uruguay) Diego Pérez (Spain) Francisco Roig	6–4, 6–3
Loss	2–1	Nov 1992	São Paulo, Brazil	Hard	(Australia) Carl Limberger	(Uruguay) Diego Pérez (Spain) Francisco Roig	2–6, 6–7
Loss	2–2	Oct 1993	Santiago, Chile	Clay	(United States) Brian Devening	(United States) Mike Bauer (Czech Republic) David Rikl	6–7, 4–6

== Challenger titles ==
=== Singles: (1) ===
No.	Year	Tournament	Surface	Opponent	Score
1.	1990	Pescara, Italy	Clay	(Spain) Germán López	4–6, 6–3, 6–4

=== Doubles: (7) ===
No.	Year	Tournament	Surface	Partner	Opponents	Score
1.	1986	Bergen, Norway	Clay	(Israel) Gilad Bloom	(Switzerland) Stephan Medem (West Germany) Harald Rittersbacher	6–4, 4–6, 6–4
2.	1988	Marrakesh, Morocco	Clay	(Sweden) Conny Falk	(United States) Lawson Duncan (West Germany) Hans Schwaier	6–3, 6–2
3.	1988	San Marino, San Marino	Clay	(Czechoslovakia) Josef Čihák	(Portugal) João Cunha-Silva (Sweden) Jörgen Windahl	6–4, 6–2
4.	1992	Santiago, Chile	Clay	(Netherlands) Jacco Van Duyn	(Argentina) Luis Lobo (Argentina) Martin Stringari	4–6, 7–6, 7–5
5.	1992	Sevilla, Spain	Clay	(Sweden) Tomas Nydahl	(Chile) Sergio Cortés (Brazil) César Kist	6–3, 6–2
6.	1992	Ribeirão Preto, Brazil	Clay	(Venezuela) Maurice Ruah	(South Africa) Lan Bale (South Africa) Brendan Curry	2–6, 7–5, 6–4
7.	1993	Eisenach, Germany	Clay	(Ukraine) Dimitri Poliakov	(Georgia (country)) Vladimir Gabrichidze (Russia) Andrei Merinov	6–7, 6–4, 6–4
