= Rodolfo Lamboglia =

Argentine film director

Executive Film Producer

Rodolfo Lamboglia is an Argentine film producer, best known for his creation of sports documentaries.

== Background ==
Rodolfo Lamboglia spent his youth in Buenos Aires. He is the founder of the production company Bourke, where he is CEO at his offices in Buenos Aires, Montevideo, and Miami.

== Films ==
He has produced projects including Sueño Bendito, a biopic about Diego Maradona that streamed on Amazon. In 2022 he produced a documentary on tennis player Guillermo Pérez Roldán for Star television network, as well as a documentary about Juan Martín del Potro. In 2022 he began producing a documentary on basketball player Manu Ginóbili. He has been the recipient of a Promax Awards, Telly Awards, Communicator Awards and the Amauta Award. He was nominated for an Emmy in 2020, and in 2021 he was the director of the short ESPN El Entretiempo, which received a Webby award.

Lamboglia also was a producer on the films Noche Americana (2022), Una Jirafa en el Balcón (2024), El asistente (2023); Ustedes deciden (2023), Yo, traidor, Linda (2024), Parking (2025), and Adolfo Cambiaso, En el nombre del polo (2025).
