= 1988 Athens Open =

- Date: 13–19 June
- Edition: 3rd
- Category: Grand Prix
- Draw: 32S / 16D
- Prize money: $93,400
- Surface: Clay / outdoor
- Location: Athens, Greece

Champions

Singles
- (Austria) Horst Skoff

Doubles
- (Sweden) Rikard Bergh / (Sweden) Per Henricsson
← 1987 ·	ATP Athens Open	· 1989 →

The 1988 Athens Open was a men's tennis tournament played on outdoor clay courts in Athens in Greece that was part of the 1988 Nabisco Grand Prix. It was the third edition of the tournament and was held from 13 June until 19 June 1988. Eighth-seeded Horst Skoff won the singles title.

== Finals ==
=== Singles ===
(Austria) Horst Skoff defeated (Socialist Federal Republic of Yugoslavia) Bruno Orešar 6–3, 2–6, 6–2

- It was Skoff's 1st singles title of his career.

=== Doubles ===
(Sweden) Rikard Bergh / (Sweden) Per Henricsson defeated (Peru) Pablo Arraya / (Czechoslovakia) Karel Nováček 6–4, 7–5

- It was Bergh's only title of the year and the 1st of his career. It was Henricsson's only title of the year and the 1st of his career.

== See also ==
- 1988 Athens Trophy – women's tournament
