= Marco Armellini =

Italian tennis player

- Full name: Marco Armellini
- Country (sports): Italy
- Born: 17 August 1960 (age 64); Udine, Italy
- Height: 6 ft 2 in (188 cm)
- Plays: Right-handed

Singles
- Career record: 4–3
- Highest ranking: No. 145 (25 August 1986)

Doubles
- Career record: 1–5
- Highest ranking: No. 355 (28 July 1986)

Marco Armellini (born 17 August 1960) is a former professional tennis player from Italy.

== Biography ==
Armellini comes from the northeastern Italian city of Udine.

A right-handed player, he played on the professional tour in the 1980s, reaching a career high singles ranking of 145. His best performance in a Grand Prix tournament was a quarter-final appearance at Palermo in 1980. He had wins over both world number 24 Eric Jelen and former top 10 player Juan Aguilera to make the round of 16 of the 1986 Austrian Open.
