= Eduardo Osta =

Spanish tennis player (born 1959)

- Country (sports): Spain
- Born: September 4, 1959 (age 65); Barcelona, Spain
- Height: 1.60 m (5 ft 3 in)
- Plays: Left-handed
- Prize money: $43,441

Singles
- Career record: 5–18
- Career titles: 0
- Highest ranking: No. 140 (7 November 1988)

Grand Slam singles results
- French Open: 1R (1982, 1988)

Doubles
- Career record: 1–7
- Career titles: 0
- Highest ranking: No. 285 (2 January 1984)

Eduardo Osta Valenti (born 4 September 1959) is a former professional tennis player from Catalonia, Spain.

== Playing career ==
Osta took part in the men's singles draw at the 1982 French Open. He was defeated in the first round by fourth seed José Luis Clerc. The Spaniard also appeared in the 1988 French Open, as a qualifier, but again lost in the opening round, to Francisco Yunis in four sets.

== Coaching ==
During the early 1990s he coached both Arantxa Sánchez Vicario and Conchita Martínez.

== Challenger titles ==
=== Singles: (1) ===
No.	Year	Tournament	Surface	Opponent	Score
1.	1988	Tarbes, France	Clay	(Spain) Jesus Colas	7–6, 6–4
