= Jorge Bardou =

Spanish tennis player (born 1965)

- Country (sports): Spain
- Born: 5 March 1965 (age 61) Barcelona, Spain
- Height: 1.80 m (5 ft 11 in)
- Plays: Right-handed
- Prize money: US$66,260

Singles
- Career record: 10–27
- Highest ranking: No. 173 (9 May 1988)

Grand Slam singles results
- Australian Open: Q1 (1984)
- French Open: DNP
- Wimbledon: DNP
- US Open: DNP

Doubles
- Career record: 14–26
- Highest ranking: No. 104 (14 April 1986)

Jorge Bardou Delgado (born 5 March 1965) is a former tennis player from Spain.

Bardou represented his native country in the singles competition at the 1984 Summer Olympics in Los Angeles.

Bardou's highest ranking in singles was world No. 173, which he reached on 9 May 1985. His highest doubles ranking was world No. 104, which he reached on 14 April 1986.

== Grand Prix career finals ==
=== Doubles: (1 runner-up) ===
Result	W-L	Date	Tournament	Surface	Partner	Opponents	Score
Loss	0–1	May 1985	Madrid, Spain	Clay	(Spain) Alberto Tous	(Brazil) Givaldo Barbosa (Brazil) Ivan Kley	6–7, 4–6
