= Pavel Vojtíšek =

Czech-German tennis player

- ITF name: Paul Vojtischek
- Country (sports): West Germany
- Residence: Munich
- Born: 13 June 1963 (age 61); Olomouc, Czechoslovakia
- Height: 1.88 m (6 ft 2 in)
- Turned pro: 1986
- Plays: Right-handed
- Prize money: $149,428

Singles
- Career record: 22–37
- Career titles: 0
- Highest ranking: No. 73 (21 September 1987)

Grand Slam singles results
- Australian Open: 1R (1990)
- French Open: 1R (1987, 1988, 1989)
- Wimbledon: 1R (1987)

Doubles
- Career record: 2–14
- Career titles: 0
- Highest ranking: No. 194 (23 March 1987)
Medal record
Representing Czechoslovakia
Friendship Games
Bronze medal – third place	1984	Men's doubles

Pavel Vojtíšek (Note: ATP and ITF websites list his name as Paul Vojtischek but English language newspaper articles from his playing days use Pavel Vojtisek.) (born 13 June 1963) is a Czechoslovak-born West German retired professional tennis player. Vojtíšek, who got West German citizenship in his early 20s, is married to two-time Grand Slam finalist Renáta Tomanová.

== Career ==
Vojtíšek was a semi-finalist at Athens in 1987 and also reached the quarter-finals in Bastad that season. His best win of the year came when he beat world number 10 Tim Mayotte in Forest Hills.

In the 1987 French Open, his first Grand Slam appearance, Vojtíšek couldn't capitalise on a two set lead over Luiz Mattar in the opening round, losing in five. He played in two further French Opens, one Australian Open and one Wimbledon, but would fail to win a single set in each.

Vojtíšek did well in Athens again in 1988, making the quarter-finals.

In 1989 he had wins over both Thomas Muster and Sergi Bruguera, en route to the semi-finals of the Palermo Grand Prix tournament.

He reached quarter-finals in both Guaruja, Rio de Janeiro and San Marino in 1990.

== Challenger titles ==
=== Singles: (1) ===
No.	Year	Tournament	Surface	Opponent	Score
1.	1987	São Paulo, Brazil	Clay	(Argentina) Roberto Argüello	6–4, 2–6, 6–3
