= Bruno Orešar =

Croatian businessman and tennis player

- Country (sports): Yugoslavia
- Residence: Zagreb, Croatia
- Born: 21 April 1967 (age 59) Zagreb, Yugoslavia
- Height: 1.75 m (5 ft 9 in)
- Turned pro: 1985
- Retired: 1991
- Plays: Right-handed
- Prize money: $361,152

Singles
- Career record: 57–76
- Career titles: 0
- Highest ranking: No. 46 (8 May 1989)

Grand Slam singles results
- Australian Open: 2R (1990)
- French Open: 2R (1986, 1988, 1990)
- Wimbledon: 1R (1990)
- US Open: 1R (1985, 1987)

Doubles
- Career record: 15–18
- Career titles: 0
- Highest ranking: No. 107 (26 June 1989)

Team competitions
- Davis Cup: SF (1988)
Medal record
Universiade
Gold medal – first place	1987 Zagreb	Singles
Gold medal – first place	1987 Zagreb	Mixed Doubles

Bruno Orešar (born 21 April 1967) is a Croatian businessman and former professional tennis player who competed for Yugoslavia.

== Tennis career ==
Orešar had a highly successful junior tennis career. He is a three-time winner of Orange Bowl, his third win coming after beating the then-16-year-old Boris Becker in the final. At one time, he was the number one ranked junior in the world.

Orešar's senior career was less successful. Apart from winning two gold medals in the 1987 Summer Universiade (in singles and in mixed doubles with Sabrina Goleš), his biggest singles tournament successes were reaching the finals of Athens and Båstad in 1988 and 1989 respectively. A persistent back injury forced him into early retirement from professional tennis in 1991. His highest ATP ranking was #46 in May 1989.

In the early 1990s, Orešar took part in founding the Croatian Tennis Association and coached the Croatian national tennis team. In 1995, he bought Jadrankamen, a Brač-based quarrying company, and expanded further into construction and tourism. In 2005, he made the list of 1000 most powerful people in Croatia, compiled by Nacional weekly.

== Career finals ==
=== Singles (2 runners-up) ===
Result	W-L	Date	Tournament	Surface	Opponent	Score
Loss	0–1	Jun 1988	Athens Open, Greece	Clay	(Austria) Horst Skoff	3–6, 6–2, 2–6
Loss	0–2	Aug 1989	Swedish Open, Sweden	Clay	(Italy) Paolo Canè	6–7^{(4–7)}, 6–7^{(5–7)}

=== Doubles (1 runner-up) ===
Result	W-L	Date	Tournament	Surface	Partner	Opponents	Score
Loss	0–1	Jul 1988	Boston, U.S.	Clay	(Peru) Jaime Yzaga	(Mexico) Jorge Lozano (United States) Todd Witsken	2–6, 5–7
