= Guillermo Pérez Roldán =

Argentine tennis player

- Country (sports): Argentina
- Residence: Mar del Plata, Argentina
- Born: 20 October 1969 (age 56) Tandil, Argentina
- Height: 1.78 m (5 ft 10 in)
- Turned pro: 1986
- Retired: 1996
- Plays: Right-handed (one-handed backhand)
- Prize money: US$1,686,459

Singles
- Career record: 241–137
- Career titles: 9
- Highest ranking: No. 13 (12 September 1988)

Grand Slam singles results
- French Open: QF (1988)
- US Open: 3R (1988)

Doubles
- Career record: 45–45
- Career titles: 0
- Highest ranking: No. 74 (1 May 1989)

Grand Slam doubles results
- French Open: 1R (1988)

Grand Slam mixed doubles results
- French Open: 1R (1987)

Guillermo Pérez Roldán (Latin American Spanish pronunciation: [ɡiˈʝeɾmo ˈpeɾes rolˈdan]; born 20 October 1969) is a former professional tennis player from Argentina.

Pérez Roldán was known particularly as a strong clay court player. He turned professional in 1986. Between 1987 and 1993, he won nine top-level singles titles. His best Grand Slam performance came at the 1988 French Open, where he reached the quarter-finals, beating Alberto Mancini, Tore Meinecke, Patrik Kühnen and Stefan Edberg on the way, before being knocked out by Andre Agassi.

== Tennis career ==
=== Juniors ===
Pérez Roldán had an excellent junior career, winning the French Open Boys' Singles championship on his favored red clay in both 1986 and 1987 – since the open era, he is the only individual to have captured the Boys' Singles championship at the French Open more than once.

Junior Grand Slam results:

Australian Open: -
French Open: W (1986, 1987)
Wimbledon: 2R (1985)
US Open: 3R (1985)

=== Pro tour ===
He burst onto the scene as a teenager in 1987, winning two tour titles at the age of seventeen. In 1988, already seeded 14 by age eighteen, he reached the final of the Italian Open, where he battled Ivan Lendl in five grueling sets. Later that year, he followed up his clay-court success at the French Open, reaching the quarterfinals with wins over Alberto Mancini, Tore Meinecke, Patrik Kühnen and Stefan Edberg, before losing to Andre Agassi. He was named Rolex Rookie of the Year in 1988.

At the 1988 US Open, John McEnroe expressed outrage at being seeded lower than Pérez Roldán, who had not yet won a match on hard courts. However, Pérez Roldán silenced critics by progressing further in the tournament than McEnroe.

Pérez Roldán's career-high singles ranking was World No. 13 (in 1988), and his career prize-money earnings totaled $1,686,341. Despite his teenage success, in the early 1990s, his career was hamstrung by injuries, and he finally retired from the professional tour in 1996.

Pérez Roldán is currently tied for tenth on the list of most titles won by a teenager in the Open Era (five).

== Personal life ==
He has alleged suffering extensive physical, mental and financial abuse during his tennis career from his coach and father Raúl Pérez Roldán. A biopic based on his life was directed by Rodolfo Lamboglia and released on Star Television Network.

== Junior Grand Slam finals ==
=== Singles: 2 (2 titles) ===
Result	Year	Championship	Surface	Opponent	Score
Win	1986	French Open	Clay	(France) Stéphane Grenier	4–6, 6–3, 6–2
Win	1987	French Open	Clay	(Australia) Jason Stoltenberg	6–3, 3–6, 6–2

=== Doubles: 1 (1 runner-up) ===
Result	Year	Championship	Surface	Partner	Opponents	Score
Loss	1987	French Open	Clay	(Argentina) Franco Davín	(United States) Jim Courier (United States) Jonathan Stark	7–6, 4–6, 3–6

== ATP career finals ==
=== Singles: 20 (9 titles / 11 runner-ups) ===
Legend Grand Slam Tournaments (0–0) ATP World Tour Finals (0–0) ATP World Tour Masters Series (0–1) ATP Championship Series (0–2) ATP World Series (9–8)	Finals by surface Hard (0–0) Clay (9–11) Grass (0–0) Carpet (0–0)	Finals by setting Outdoors (9–11) Indoors (0–0)

Result	W–L	Date	Tournament	Tier	Surface	Opponent	Score
Win	1–0	May 1987	Munich, Germany	Grand Prix	Clay	(Czechoslovakia) Marián Vajda	6–3, 7–6
Win	2–0	Jun 1987	Athens, Greece	Grand Prix	Clay	(Germany) Tore Meinecke	6–2, 6–3
Loss	2–1	Jul 1987	Hilversum, Netherlands	Grand Prix	Clay	(Czechoslovakia) Miloslav Mečíř	4–6, 6–1, 3–6, 2–6
Win	3–1	Nov 1987	Buenos Aires, Argentina	Grand Prix	Clay	(United States) Jay Berger	3–2 ret.
Win	4–1	May 1988	Munich, Germany	Grand Prix	Clay	(Sweden) Jonas Svensson	7–5, 6–3
Loss	4–2	May 1988	Rome, Italy	Masters Series	Clay	(Czechoslovakia) Ivan Lendl	6–2, 4–6, 2–6, 6–4, 4–6
Loss	4–3	Jul 1988	Hilversum, Netherlands	Grand Prix	Clay	(Spain) Emilio Sánchez	3–6, 1–6, 6–3, 3–6
Loss	4–4	Aug 1988	Prague, Czech Republic	Grand Prix	Clay	(Austria) Thomas Muster	4–6, 7–5, 2–6
Loss	4–5	Nov 1988	Buenos Aires, Argentina	Grand Prix	Clay	(Spain) Javier Sánchez	2–6, 6–7
Loss	4–6	Sep 1989	Geneva, Switzerland	Grand Prix	Clay	(Switzerland) Marc Rosset	4–6, 5–7
Win	5–6	Sep 1989	Palermo, Italy	Grand Prix	Clay	(Italy) Paolo Canè	6–1, 6–4
Loss	5–7	Mar 1990	Casablanca, Morocco	World Series	Clay	(Austria) Thomas Muster	1–6, 7–6^{(8–6)}, 2–6
Loss	5–8	Apr 1990	Barcelona, Spain	Championship Series	Clay	(Ecuador) Andrés Gómez	0–6, 6–7^{(1–7)}, 6–3, 6–0, 2–6
Loss	5–9	Jul 1990	Stuttgart, Germany	Championship Series	Clay	(Socialist Federal Republic of Yugoslavia) Goran Ivanišević	7–6^{(7–2)}, 1–6, 4–6, 6–7^{(5–7)}
Win	6–9	Aug 1990	San Marino, San Marino	World Series	Clay	(Italy) Omar Camporese	6–3, 6–3
Loss	6–10	Apr 1991	Munich, Germany	World Series	Clay	(Sweden) Magnus Gustafsson	6–3, 3–6, 3–4 ret.
Win	7–10	Jul 1991	San Marino, San Marino	World Series	Clay	(France) Frédéric Fontang	6–3, 6–1
Win	8–10	Mar 1992	Casablanca, Morocco	World Series	Clay	(Spain) Germán López	2–6, 7–5, 6–3
Loss	8–11	Jun 1992	Genova, Italy	World Series	Clay	(Ukraine) Andrei Medvedev	3–6, 4–6
Win	9–11	Mar 1993	Casablanca, Morocco	World Series	Clay	(Morocco) Younes El Aynaoui	6–4, 6–3

=== Doubles: 3 (3 runner-ups) ===
Legend Grand Slam Tournaments (0–0) ATP World Tour Finals (0–0) ATP Masters Series (0–0) ATP Championship Series (0–0) ATP World Series (0–3)	Finals by surface Hard (0–0) Clay (0–3) Grass (0–0) Carpet (0–0)	Finals by setting Outdoors (0–3) Indoors (0–0)

Result	W–L	Date	Tournament	Tier	Surface	Partner	Opponents	Score
Loss	0–1	Jul 1988	Hilversum, Netherlands	Grand Prix	Clay	(Sweden) Magnus Gustafsson	(Spain) Sergio Casal (Spain) Emilio Sánchez Vicario	6–7, 3–6
Loss	0–2	Sep 1988	Geneva, Switzerland	Grand Prix	Clay	(Argentina) Gustavo Luza	(Iran) Mansour Bahrami (Czechoslovakia) Tomáš Šmíd	4–6, 3–6
Loss	0–3	Sep 1989	Geneva, Switzerland	Grand Prix	Clay	(Iran) Mansour Bahrami	(Ecuador) Andrés Gómez (Argentina) Alberto Mancini	3–6, 5–7

== ATP Challenger and ITF Futures Finals ==
=== Singles: 5 (4–1) ===
Legend (singles) ATP Challenger Tour (4–1) ITF Futures Tour (0–0)	Titles by surface Hard (0–0) Clay (4–1) Grass (0–0) Carpet (0–0)

Result	W–L	Date	Tournament	Tier	Surface	Opponent	Score
Loss	0–1	Mar 1990	Agadir, Morocco	Challenger	Clay	(Austria) Thomas Muster	2–6, 5–7
Win	1–1	Sep 1990	Messina, Italy	Challenger	Clay	(Italy) Stefano Pescosolido	6–1, 6–3
Win	2–1	Jul 1991	Salerno, Italy	Challenger	Clay	(Italy) Claudio Pistolesi	4–6, 6–1, 6–3
Win	3–1	Mar 1992	Agadir, Morocco	Challenger	Clay	(Spain) Francisco Roig	6–2, 2–6, 6–4
Win	4–1	Aug 1992	Graz, Austria	Challenger	Clay	(Czech Republic) Karel Novacek	3–6, 6–2, 7–5

=== Doubles: 2 (1–1) ===
Legend (singles) ATP Challenger Tour (1–1) ITF Futures Tour (0–0)	Titles by surface Hard (1–0) Clay (0–1) Grass (0–0) Carpet (0–0)

Result	W–L	Date	Tournament	Tier	Surface	Partner	Opponents	Score
Loss	0–1	Apr 1990	San Luis Potosí, Mexico	Challenger	Clay	(Mexico) Luis Herrera	(Mexico) Leonardo Lavalle (Mexico) Jorge Lozano	7–5, 3–6, 2–6
Win	1–1	Sep 1991	Messina, Italy	Challenger	Hard	(Italy) Renzo Furlan	(Sweden) Jan Apell (Germany) Markus Naewie	6–4, 6–2

== Performance timelines ==
Key
W	F	SF	QF	#R	RR	Q#	DNQ	A	NH

(W) winner; (F) finalist; (SF) semifinalist; (QF) quarterfinalist; (#R) rounds 4, 3, 2, 1; (RR) round-robin stage; (Q#) qualification round; (DNQ) did not qualify; (A) absent; (NH) not held; (SR) strike rate (events won / competed); (W–L) win–loss record.

=== Singles ===
Tournament	1987	1988	1989	1990	1991	1992	1993	1994	SR	W–L	Win %
Grand Slam tournaments
Australian Open	A	A	A	A	A	A	A	A	0 / 0	0–0	–
French Open	1R	QF	4R	4R	1R	1R	1R	1R	0 / 8	10–8	56%
Wimbledon	A	A	A	A	A	A	A	A	0 / 0	0–0	–
US Open	A	3R	3R	A	A	A	A	A	0 / 2	4–2	67%
Win–loss	0–1	6–2	5–2	3–1	0–1	0–1	0–1	0–1	0 / 10	14–10	58%
ATP Masters Series
Miami	A	1R	2R	A	2R	A	A	A	0 / 3	1–3	25%
Monte Carlo	A	2R	QF	2R	2R	1R	1R	A	0 / 6	4–6	40%
Hamburg	2R	QF	3R	1R	A	2R	1R	A	0 / 6	5–6	45%
Rome	2R	F	QF	QF	1R	2R	QF	A	0 / 7	16–7	70%
Canada	A	A	2R	A	A	A	A	A	0 / 1	1–1	50%
Cincinnati	A	1R	A	A	A	A	A	A	0 / 1	0–1	0%
Paris	A	1R	A	2R	A	A	A	A	0 / 2	0–2	0%
Win–loss	2–2	7–6	8–5	4–4	1–3	2–3	3–3	0–0	0 / 26	27–26	51%
