= Juan Avendaño =

Spanish tennis player (born 1961)

- Country (sports): Spain
- Residence: Madrid, Spain
- Born: 29 January 1961 (age 64); Luanco, Spain
- Height: 1.77 m (5 ft 9 1/2 in)
- Turned pro: 1980
- Plays: Right-handed (two-handed backhand)
- Prize money: $216,639

Singles
- Career record: 39–75
- Career titles: 0
- Highest ranking: No. 71 (07 June 1982)

Grand Slam singles results
- French Open: 3R (1982)
- Wimbledon: 1R (1982, 1983, 1987)

Doubles
- Career record: 12–41
- Career titles: 0
- Highest ranking: No. 187 (10 Sep 1984)

Juan Bautista Avendaño Iglesias (born 29 January 1961) is a former professional tennis player from Spain, best remembered for being Spain Davis Cup team captain along Jordi Arrese and Josep Perlas when Spain won its second Davis Cup title, in 2004.

== Career finals ==
=== Doubles (1 runner-up) ===
Result	W/L	Date	Tournament	Surface	Partner	Opponents	Score
Loss	0–1	Jul 1984	Båstad, Sweden	Clay	(Brazil) Fernando Roese	(Sweden) Jan Gunnarsson (Denmark) Michael Mortensen	0–6, 0–6
