= Tarik Benhabiles =

Algerian-French tennis player

- Country (sports): France
- Born: 5 February 1965 (age 60) Algiers, Algeria
- Height: 5 ft 9 in (175 cm)
- Plays: Right-handed
- Prize money: $505,471

Singles
- Career record: 69–107
- Highest ranking: No. 22 (8 June 1987)

Grand Slam singles results
- Australian Open: 3R (1984)
- French Open: 4R (1987)
- Wimbledon: 1R (1985, 1988, 1990)
- US Open: 2R (1987)

Doubles
- Career record: 23–45
- Highest ranking: No. 76 (27 April 1987)

Grand Slam doubles results
- Australian Open: 2R (1988)
- French Open: 3R (1986)

Tarik Benhabiles (born 5 February 1965) is an Algerian-born French former tennis player. He achieved his highest ATP-ranking on 8 June 1987, when the right-hander was listed as the number 22 player in the world.

Benhabiles's professional career began in 1981, the year he won the junior championship at the French Open, and it ended in 1992. He never won an ATP title, but he reached two finals. He lost to Vitas Gerulaitis at Treviso in 1984, and he lost to Ronald Agénor at Genova in 1990. Benhabiles won the closed French national tournament in 1986. Benhabiles was a member of the French Davis Cup national team, but he played only one match, a 1987 doubles match against South Korea. He ended his professional tennis player career in 1992, when he was 27. His career singles record was 69–107.

After he retired, Benhabiles began a coaching career, first working with Nicolas Escudé until 1997 and then relocating to the United States to coach a young Andy Roddick. He built a strong relationship with Roddick and helped guide him to the ATP Top 10. They parted company after Roddick's loss to Sargis Sargsian at the 2003 French Open. With his new coach, Brad Gilbert, Roddick won the U.S. Open and was ranked by the ATP as the top player in the world before the end of 2003.

After Roddick, Benhabiles coached Richard Gasquet (until January 2004), Tatiana Golovin (in 2006), Benjamin Becker, and Vania King. From 2023 until 2025, Benhabiles coached junior Grand Slam semifinalist Arthur Géa, leading to his maiden tournament victory as a pro in November 2023.
