= Ricki Osterthun =

German tennis player

- Country (sports): West Germany
- Born: 2 May 1964 (age 62) Hamburg, West Germany
- Height: 1.85 m (6 ft 1 in)
- Plays: Right-handed

Singles
- Career record: 60–79
- Career titles: 1
- Highest ranking: No. 58 (19 October 1987)

Grand Slam singles results
- Australian Open: 2R (1985)
- French Open: 4R (1987)
- Wimbledon: 2R (1986, 1987, 1988)
- US Open: 2R (1986, 1987, 1988)

Doubles
- Career record: 45–67
- Career titles: 3
- Highest ranking: No. 67 (24 April 1989)

Grand Slam doubles results
- Australian Open: 2R (1990)
- French Open: 3R (1988)
- Wimbledon: 2R (1988)

Ricki Osterthun (born 2 May 1964) is a former tennis player from West Germany, who won one single title (1985, Hilversum) during his professional career.

The right-hander reached his highest singles ATP-ranking on 19 October 1987, when Osterhun became the number 58 of the world.

== Career finals ==
=== Singles (1 win, 2 losses) ===
Result	W–L	Date	Tournament	Surface	Opponent	Score
Win	1–0	Jul 1985	Hilversum, Netherlands	Clay	(Sweden) Kent Carlsson	4–6, 4–6, 6–2, 6–4, 6–3
Loss	1–1	May 1986	Munich, West Germany	Clay	(Spain) Emilio Sánchez	6–1, 6–3
Loss	1–2	Oct 1987	Toulouse, France	Carpet (i)	(United States) Tim Mayotte	6–2, 5–7, 6–4

=== Doubles (3 wins) ===
Result	W–L	Date	Tournament	Surface	Partner	Opponents	Score
Win	1–0	Jun 1987	Athens, Greece	Clay	(West Germany) Tore Meinecke	(Czechoslovakia) Jaroslav Navrátil (Netherlands) Tom Nijssen	6–2, 3–6, 6–2
Win	2–0	Oct 1988	Toulouse, France	Hard (i)	(Netherlands) Tom Nijssen	(Iran) Mansour Bahrami (France) Guy Forget	6–3, 6–4
Win	3–0	Apr 1989	Nice, France	Clay	(Germany) Udo Riglewski	(Switzerland) Heinz Günthardt (Hungary) Balázs Taróczy	7–6, 6–7, 6–1
