= Tore Meinecke =

West German tennis player

- Country (sports): West Germany
- Residence: Reith bei Kitzbühel, Austria
- Born: 21 July 1967 (age 59) Hamburg, West Germany
- Height: 1.80 m (5 ft 11 in)
- Turned pro: 1983
- Retired: 1989
- Plays: Right-handed
- Prize money: $242,301

Singles
- Career record: 40–51
- Career titles: 0
- Highest ranking: No. 46 (9 May 1988)

Grand Slam singles results
- Australian Open: 2R (1989)
- French Open: 2R (1988)
- Wimbledon: 2R (1988)

Doubles
- Career record: 47–52
- Career titles: 2
- Highest ranking: No. 46 (13 July 1987)

Grand Slam doubles results
- Australian Open: 2R (1989)
- French Open: 3R (1987, 1988)
- Wimbledon: 1R (1985, 1988)

Tore Meinecke (born 21 July 1967) is a former professional tennis player from West Germany.

== Career ==
As a junior, Meinecke won the Orange Bowl doubles champion 16-under in 1982 (partnering Boris Becker) and was runner-up at the European Junior Championships (w/Becker). He turned pro in 1983. During his professional career, Meinecke won two doubles titles. He achieved a career-high singles ranking of world No. 46 in May 1988 and a career-high doubles ranking of No. 46 in July 1987.

In June 1989, Meinecke suffered a car crash in Clermont-Ferrand, France which put him in a coma for more than a month and forced him to retire from professional tennis at the age of 22.

He currently runs a tennis school near Geneva, Switzerland together with Jonas Svensson.

== Career finals ==
=== Singles (1 loss) ===
Result	W/L	Date	Tournament	Surface	Opponent	Score
Loss	0–1	Jun 1987	Athens, Greece	Clay	(Argentina) Guillermo Pérez Roldán	2–6, 3–6

=== Doubles (2 wins, 1 loss) ===
Result	W/L	Date	Tournament	Surface	Partner	Opponents	Score
Loss	0–1	Jan 1987	Guarujá, Brazil	Hard	(West Germany) Martin Hipp	(Brazil) Luiz Mattar (Brazil) Cássio Motta	6–7, 1–6
Win	1–1	Jun 1987	Athens, Greece	Clay	(West Germany) Ricki Osterthun	(Czechoslovakia) Jaroslav Navrátil (Netherlands) Tom Nijssen	6–2, 3–6, 6–2
Win	2–1	Feb 1988	Rotterdam, Netherlands	Carpet (i)	(West Germany) Patrik Kühnen	(Sweden) Magnus Gustafsson (Italy) Diego Nargiso	7–6, 7–6
