= 1989 Bologna Open – Doubles =

Doubles
- 1989 Bologna Open

Final
- Champions: (Spain) Sergio Casal (Spain) Javier Sánchez
- Runners-up: (Sweden) Tomas Nydahl (Sweden) Jörgen Windahl
- Score: 6–2, 6–3

Events
Singles	Doubles
← 1988 ·	Bologna Outdoor	· 1990 →

Emilio Sánchez and Javier Sánchez were the defending champions, but Emilio did not compete this year.

Javier teamed up with Sergio Casal and successfully defended his title, by defeating Tomas Nydahl and Jörgen Windahl 6–2, 6–3 in the final.

== Seeds ==
1. (Spain) Sergio Casal / (Spain) Javier Sánchez (champions)
2. (Italy) Claudio Panatta / (Argentina) Guillermo Pérez Roldán (semifinals)
3. (Switzerland) Claudio Mezzadri / (Austria) Horst Skoff (quarterfinals)
4. (Sweden) Tomas Nydahl / (Sweden) Jörgen Windahl (final)

== Draw ==
=== Key ===
- Q = Qualifier
- WC = Wild card
- LL = Lucky loser
- Alt = Alternate
- SE = Special exempt
- PR = Protected ranking
- ITF = ITF entry
- JE = Junior exempt
- w/o = Walkover
- r = Retired
- d = Defaulted
- SR = Special ranking

=== Draw ===
First round
1	(Spain) S Casal (Spain) J Sánchez	6	6
(Chile) P Rebolledo (Ecuador) R Viver	3	1
(Sweden) M Larsson (Soviet Union) A Võsand	3	4
(Italy) F Cancellotti (Italy) S Colombo	6	6
3	(Switzerland) C Mezzadri (Austria) H Skoff	6	7
(Argentina) R Azar (Argentina) F Davín	4	6
(Italy) C Aprili (New Zealand) B Derlin	6	6	6
(Italy) M Cierro (Italy) A de Minicis	2	7	2
WC	(Haiti) R Agénor (Italy) M Boscatto	6	6
(Peru) A Aramburú (Argentina) JC Yunis	2	4
(Italy) F Mordegan (Italy) Mariano Vantini	2	1
4	(Sweden) T Nydahl (Sweden) J Windahl	6	6
(Italy) S Mezzadri (Italy) U Pigato	3	6
(Argentina) G Mirad (Argentina) F Yunis	6	7
(Netherlands) M Koevermans (Sweden) J Svensson	0	4
2	(Italy) C Panatta (Argentina) G Pérez Roldán	6	6

Quarterfinals
1	(Spain) S Casal (Spain) J Sánchez	6	6
(Italy) F Cancellotti (Italy) S Colombo	3	4
3	(Switzerland) C Mezzadri (Austria) H Skoff	5	6
(Italy) C Aprili (New Zealand) B Derlin	7	7
WC	(Haiti) R Agénor (Italy) M Boscatto	6	5
4	(Sweden) T Nydahl (Sweden) J Windahl	7	7
(Argentina) G Mirad (Argentina) F Yunis	1	3
2	(Italy) C Panatta (Argentina) G Pérez Roldán	6	6

Semifinals
1	(Spain) S Casal (Spain) J Sánchez	7	6
(Italy) C Aprili (New Zealand) B Derlin	6	3
4	(Sweden) T Nydahl (Sweden) J Windahl	w/o
2	(Italy) C Panatta (Argentina) G Pérez Roldán

Final
1	(Spain) S Casal (Spain) J Sánchez	6	6
4	(Sweden) T Nydahl (Sweden) J Windahl	2	3
