= 1987 Madrid Tennis Grand Prix =

- Date: 14–20 September
- Edition: 16th
- Category: Grand Prix
- Draw: 32S / 16D
- Prize money: $89,400
- Surface: Clay / outdoor
- Location: Madrid, Spain
- Venue: Club de Campo Villa de Madrid

Champions

Singles
- (Spain) Emilio Sánchez

Doubles
- (Peru) Carlos di Laura / (Spain) Javier Sánchez
- Madrid Tennis Grand Prix

The 1987 Madrid Tennis Grand Prix was a men's tennis tournament played on outdoor clay courts at the Club de Campo Villa de Madrid in Madrid, Spain that was part of the 1987 Nabisco Grand Prix circuit. It was the 16th edition of the tournament and was played from 14 September until 20 September 1987. First-seeded Emilio Sánchez won the singles title after defeating his brother Javier in the final.

== Finals ==
=== Singles ===
(Spain) Emilio Sánchez defeated (Spain) Javier Sánchez 6–3, 3–6, 6–2

- It was Sánchez' 4th singles title and the 7th of his career.

=== Doubles ===
(Peru) Carlos di Laura / (Spain) Javier Sánchez defeated (Spain) Sergio Casal / (Spain) Emilio Sánchez 6–3, 3–6, 6–4

- It was Di Laura's only doubles title of the year and the first of his career. It was Sánchez' first doubles title of his career.
