= 1987 Head Cup – Singles =

Singles
- 1987 Head Cup

Final
- Champion: (Spain) Emilio Sánchez
- Runner-up: (Czechoslovakia) Miloslav Mečíř
- Score: 6–4, 6–1, 4–6, 6–1

Details
- Draw: 64 (5WC/8Q)
- Seeds: 16

Events
Singles	Doubles
- Austrian Open Kitzbühel

First-seeded Miloslav Mečíř was the defending champion, but lost in the final to second-seeded Emilio Sánchez. The score was 6–4, 6–1, 4–6, 6–1.

== Seeds ==
1. (Czechoslovakia) Miloslav Mečíř (final)
2. (Spain) Emilio Sánchez (champion)
3. (Czechoslovakia) Karel Nováček (first round)
4. (Argentina) Guillermo Pérez Roldán (quarterfinals)
5. (Sweden) Ulf Stenlund (first round)
6. (France) Thierry Tulasne (second round)
7. (Austria) Horst Skoff (third round)
8. (Austria) Thomas Muster (third round)
9. (Czechoslovakia) Milan Šrejber (first round)
10. (Haiti) Ronald Agénor (quarterfinals)
11. (Czechoslovakia) Marián Vajda (first round)
12. (Spain) Sergio Casal (second round)
13. (Czechoslovakia) Tomáš Šmíd (third round)
14. (Italy) Paolo Canè (first round)
15. (West Germany) Andreas Maurer (third round)
16. (West Germany) Carl-Uwe Steeb (second round, withdrew)

== Draw ==
Key

- Q = Qualifier
- WC = Wild card
- LL = Lucky loser
- Alt = Alternate
- ITF = ITF entry
- PR = Protected ranking
- SR = Special ranking
- SE = Special exempt
- JE = Junior exempt
- JR = Junior Accelerator Programme entrant
- CO = College Accelerator Programme entrant
- NG = Next Gen Accelerator Program entrant
- w/o = Walkover
- r = Retired
- d = Defaulted

=== Finals ===
Quarterfinals
1	(Czechoslovakia) Miloslav Mečíř	6	6
10	(Haiti) Ronald Agénor	4	4
(Australia) Darren Cahill	6	1	7
(West Germany) Ricki Osterthun	3	6	5
(West Germany) Tore Meinecke	1	6	6
4	(Argentina) Guillermo Pérez Roldán	6	3	4
(Peru) Pablo Arraya	3	2
2	(Spain) Emilio Sánchez	6	6

Semifinals
1	(Czechoslovakia) Miloslav Mečíř	6	6
(Australia) Darren Cahill	1	2
(West Germany) Tore Meinecke	2	2
2	(Spain) Emilio Sánchez	6	6

Final
1	(Czechoslovakia) Miloslav Mečíř	4	1	6	1
2	(Spain) Emilio Sánchez	6	6	4	6

=== Top half ===
==== Section 1 ====
First round
1	(Czechoslovakia) M Mečíř	7	4	6
(France) T Champion	5	6	4
(West Germany) W Popp	6	6
Q	(Czechoslovakia) R Vogel	4	3
(Spain) F Luna	3	4
(Italy) C Pistolesi	6	6
Q	(Argentina) J Frana	7	2	4
15	(West Germany) A Maurer	6	6	6
10	(Haiti) R Agénor	6	7
WC	(Austria) Oliver Ploner	0	6
(Australia) B Dyke	6	6	2
(Chile) P Rebolledo	7	1	6
(Uruguay) D Pérez	6	6
(West Germany) E Jelen	4	4
(Australia) C Limberger	6	4	3
8	(Austria) T Muster	2	6	6

Second round
1	(Czechoslovakia) M Mečíř	6	6
(West Germany) W Popp	3	4
(Italy) C Pistolesi	3	4
15	(West Germany) A Maurer	6	6
10	(Haiti) R Agénor	6	4	6
(Chile) P Rebolledo	2	6	2
(Uruguay) D Pérez	5	2
8	(Austria) T Muster	7	6

Third round
1	(Czechoslovakia) M Mečíř	6	6
15	(West Germany) A Maurer	2	3
10	(Haiti) R Agénor	6	6
8	(Austria) T Muster	4	2

Quarterfinals
1	(Czechoslovakia) M Mečíř	6	6
10	(Haiti) R Agénor	4	4

==== Section 2 ====
First round
3	(Czechoslovakia) K Nováček	3	3
(Australia) D Cahill	6	6
(Italy) S Colombo	2	6	6
WC	(Austria) HP Kandler	6	3	2
(United States) L Duncan	7	6
(United States) B Willenborg	5	4
(Paraguay) V Pecci	6	1
13	(Czechoslovakia) T Šmíd	7	6
11	(Czechoslovakia) M Vajda	3	2
Q	(Sweden) C Allgårdh	6	6
(Austria) A Antonitsch	6	7
(Italy) C Aprili	3	5
Q	(West Germany) H Rittersbacher	4	4
(West Germany) R Osterthun	6	6
Q	(Romania) F Segărceanu	6	7
5/WC	(Sweden) U Stenlund	4	6

Second round
(Australia) D Cahill	6	6
(Italy) S Colombo	3	3
(United States) L Duncan	4	2
13	(Czechoslovakia) T Šmíd	6	6
Q	(Sweden) C Allgårdh	2	1
(Austria) A Antonitsch	6	6
(West Germany) R Osterthun	6	6
Q	(Romania) F Segărceanu	3	1

Third round
(Australia) D Cahill	6	7	7
13	(Czechoslovakia) T Šmíd	7	6	6
(Austria) A Antonitsch	7	2	4
(West Germany) R Osterthun	6	6	6

Quarterfinals
(Australia) D Cahill	6	1	7
(West Germany) R Osterthun	3	6	5

=== Bottom half ===
==== Section 3 ====
First round
6/WC	(France) T Tulasne	6	7	6
(West Germany) I Werner	7	6	1
(West Germany) T Meinecke	6	2	6
(Argentina) G Vilas	1	6	4
(Argentina) C Miniussi	6	6
(United States) M Buckley	1	3
WC	(Austria) G Mild	1	2
12	(Spain) S Casal	6	6
14	(Italy) P Canè	4	3
(West Germany) P Vojtíšek	6	6
(Spain) J Arrese	6	3
(Czechoslovakia) S Birner	7	6
(Peru) C di Laura	6	6
(Czechoslovakia) J Navrátil	1	2
(Socialist Federal Republic of Yugoslavia) B Orešar	3	2
4	(Argentina) G Pérez Roldán	6	6

Second round
6/WC	(France) T Tulasne	2	2
(West Germany) T Meinecke	6	6
(Argentina) C Miniussi	7	7
12	(Spain) S Casal	6	6
(West Germany) P Vojtíšek	6	3	1
(Czechoslovakia) S Birner	3	6	6
(Peru) C di Laura	3	2
4	(Argentina) G Pérez Roldán	6	6

Third round
(West Germany) T Meinecke	6	6
(Argentina) C Miniussi	2	0
(Czechoslovakia) S Birner	3	1
4	(Argentina) G Pérez Roldán	6	6

Quarterfinals
(West Germany) T Meinecke	1	6	6
4	(Argentina) G Pérez Roldán	6	3	4

==== Section 4 ====
First round
7	(Austria) H Skoff	6	6
(Sweden) LA Wahlgren	4	4
(Sweden) H Sundström	1	6	7
(Australia) P McNamee	6	4	6
(Spain) J Sánchez	6	7
(Argentina) F Davín	4	5
(Peru) P Arraya	6	1	6
9	(Czechoslovakia) M Šrejber	2	6	4
16	(West Germany) CU Steeb	6	6
(Switzerland) R Stadler	3	4
Q	(Spain) J Bardou	3	1
(Italy) F Cancellotti	6	6
Q	(West Germany) H Schwaier	6	6
Q	(Brazil) C Kist	3	4
(Argentina) R Argüello	1	3
2	(Spain) E Sánchez	6	6

Second round
7	(Austria) H Skoff	6	4	6
(Sweden) H Sundström	3	6	3
(Spain) J Sánchez	4	2
(Peru) P Arraya	6	6
16	(West Germany) CU Steeb
(Italy) F Cancellotti	w/o
Q	(West Germany) H Schwaier	4	2
2	(Spain) E Sánchez	6	6

Third round
7	(Austria) H Skoff	3	3
(Peru) P Arraya	6	6
(Italy) F Cancellotti	7	4	4
2	(Spain) E Sánchez	5	6	6

Quarterfinals
(Peru) P Arraya	3	2
2	(Spain) E Sánchez	6	6
