= 1988 Bologna Open – Doubles =

Doubles
- 1988 Bologna Open

Final
- Champions: (Spain) Emilio Sánchez (Spain) Javier Sánchez
- Runners-up: (Switzerland) Rolf Hertzog (Switzerland) Marc Walder
- Score: 6–1, 7–6

Details
- Draw: 16 (1WC)
- Seeds: 4

Events
| Singles | Doubles |
- Bologna Outdoor

Sergio Casal and Emilio Sánchez were the defending champions, but Casal did not compete this year.

Emilio teamed up with his brother Javier and successfully defended his title, by defeating Rolf Hertzog and Marc Walder 6–1, 7–6 in the final.

== Seeds ==
1. (Spain) Emilio Sánchez / (Spain) Javier Sánchez (champions)
2. (Argentina) Alberto Mancini / (Argentina) Christian Miniussi (quarterfinals)
3. (West Germany) Tore Meinecke / (West Germany) Ricki Osterthun (quarterfinals)
4. (Peru) Carlos di Laura / (Italy) Claudio Panatta (first round)

== Draw ==
Key

- Q = Qualifier
- WC = Wild card
- LL = Lucky loser
- Alt = Alternate
- ITF = ITF entry
- PR = Protected ranking
- SR = Special ranking
- SE = Special exempt
- JE = Junior exempt
- JR = Junior Accelerator Programme entrant
- CO = College Accelerator Programme entrant
- NG = Next Gen Accelerator Program entrant
- w/o = Walkover
- r = Retired
- d = Defaulted

=== Draw ===
First round
1 | (Spain) E Sánchez (Spain) J Sánchez | 7 | 5 | 6
(Italy) P Canè (Italy) M Narducci | 5 | 7 | 1
(Peru) P Arraya (Italy) M Fioroni | 4 | 2
WC | (Italy) C Pistolesi (Sweden) U Stenlund | 6 | 6
4 | (Peru) C di Laura (Italy) C Panatta | 7 | 4 | 5
(Uruguay) M Filippini (Uruguay) D Pérez | 6 | 6 | 7
(Italy) O Camporese (Italy) F Cancellotti | 6 | 6
(Italy) M Cierro (Italy) A de Minicis | 4 | 2
(United States) R Baxter (United States) T Siegel | 6 | 6
(Italy) A Baldoni (Switzerland) S Mezzadri | 1 | 2
(Argentina) M Jaite (West Germany) D Keretić | 5 | 4
3 | (West Germany) T Meinecke (West Germany) R Osterthun | 7 | 6
(Spain) T Carbonell (Mexico) A Moreno | 4 | 4
(Switzerland) R Hertzog (Switzerland) M Walder | 6 | 6
(Italy) C Aprili (Italy) E Rossi | 4 | 2
2 | (Argentina) A Mancini (Argentina) C Miniussi | 6 | 6

Quarterfinals
1 | (Spain) E Sánchez (Spain) J Sánchez | 6 | 7
WC | (Italy) C Pistolesi (Sweden) U Stenlund | 2 | 6
(Uruguay) M Filippini (Uruguay) D Pérez | 6 | 7
(Italy) O Camporese (Italy) F Cancellotti | 2 | 5
(United States) R Baxter (United States) T Siegel | 7 | 7
3 | (West Germany) T Meinecke (West Germany) R Osterthun | 6 | 6
(Switzerland) R Hertzog (Switzerland) M Walder | 6 | 6
2 | (Argentina) A Mancini (Argentina) C Miniussi | 4 | 2

Semifinals
1 | (Spain) E Sánchez (Spain) J Sánchez | 6 | 6
(Uruguay) M Filippini (Uruguay) D Pérez | 3 | 2
(United States) R Baxter (United States) T Siegel | 4 | 6 | 4
(Switzerland) R Hertzog (Switzerland) M Walder | 6 | 1 | 6

Final
1 | (Spain) E Sánchez (Spain) J Sánchez | 6 | 7
(Switzerland) R Hertzog (Switzerland) M Walder | 1 | 6
