= 1991 Campionati Internazionali di Sicilia – Singles =

Singles
- 1991 Campionati Internazionali di Sicilia

Final
- Champion: (France) Frédéric Fontang
- Runner-up: (Spain) Emilio Sánchez
- Score: 1–6, 6–3, 6–3

Details
- Draw: 32 (3WC/4Q/1LL)
- Seeds: 8

Events
Singles	Doubles
- Campionati Internazionali di Sicilia

Franco Davín was the defending champion, but did not compete this year.

Frédéric Fontang won the title by defeating Emilio Sánchez 1–6, 6–3, 6–3 in the final.

== Seeds ==
1. (Spain) Emilio Sánchez (final)
2. (Socialist Federal Republic of Yugoslavia) Goran Prpić (first round)
3. (Austria) Horst Skoff (first round)
4. (Spain) Javier Sánchez (first round)
5. (Argentina) Guillermo Pérez Roldán (second round)
6. (n/a)
7. (Spain) Francisco Clavet (first round)
8. (Austria) Thomas Muster (quarterfinals)

== Draw ==
Key

- Q = Qualifier
- WC = Wild card
- LL = Lucky loser
- Alt = Alternate
- ITF = ITF entry
- PR = Protected ranking
- SR = Special ranking
- SE = Special exempt
- JE = Junior exempt
- JR = Junior Accelerator Programme entrant
- CO = College Accelerator Programme entrant
- NG = Next Gen Accelerator Program entrant
- w/o = Walkover
- r = Retired
- d = Defaulted

=== Finals ===
Semifinals
1	(Spain) Emilio Sánchez	6	6
(Czechoslovakia) Marián Vajda	1	2
(Spain) Jordi Arrese	3	6	6^{5}
(France) Frédéric Fontang	6	2	7^{7}

Final
1	(Spain) Emilio Sánchez	6	3	3
(France) Frédéric Fontang	1	6	6

=== Top half ===
First round
1	(Spain) E Sánchez	6	6
Q	(Uruguay) D Pérez	4	0
(Argentina) M Jaite	6	6
(Netherlands) J Eltingh	2	2
(Argentina) R Azar	7	3	7^{7}
(Italy) S Pescosolido	5	6	6^{1}
(Haiti) R Agénor	0	4
8	(Austria) T Muster	6	6
3	(Austria) H Skoff	6^{5}	2
(Italy) D Nargiso	7^{7}	6
Q	(Austria) M Schäffl	3	2
(France) R Gilbert	6	6
(Czechoslovakia) M Vajda	6	2	6
(Uruguay) M Filippini	3	6	2
(Spain) F Roig	3	5
5	(Argentina) G Pérez Roldán	6	7

Second round
1	(Spain) E Sánchez	2	7^{7}	6
(Argentina) M Jaite	6	6^{3}	4
(Argentina) R Azar	1	3
8	(Austria) T Muster	6	6
(Italy) D Nargiso	6	4	6
(France) R Gilbert	4	6	1
(Czechoslovakia) M Vajda	6	6
5	(Argentina) G Pérez Roldán	2	4

Quarterfinals
1	(Spain) E Sánchez	6	7^{7}
8	(Austria) T Muster	3	6^{3}
(Italy) D Nargiso	6	6^{2}	3
(Czechoslovakia) M Vajda	2	7^{7}	6

Semifinals
1	(Spain) E Sánchez	6	6
(Czechoslovakia) M Vajda	1	2

=== Bottom half ===
First round
LL	(Soviet Union) A Võsand	2	2
(Italy) C Pistolesi	6	6
WC	(France) Y Noah	1	7	6
WC	(Spain) C Costa	6	5	4
(France) A Boetsch	5	6^{3}
Q	(Spain) JA Conde	7	7^{7}
(Spain) J Arrese	6	2	7
4	(Spain) J Sánchez	4	6	5
7	(Spain) F Clavet	2	4
(Spain) G López	6	6
(Belgium) B Wuyts	2	2
WC	(Italy) M Cierro	6	6
(France) F Fontang	4	6	6
Q	(Ukraine) A Medvedev	6	3	4
(Italy) R Furlan	6	7^{7}
2	(Socialist Federal Republic of Yugoslavia) G Prpić	4	6^{4}

Second round
(Italy) C Pistolesi	6^{5}	3
WC	(France) Y Noah	7^{7}	6
Q	(Spain) JA Conde	3	4
(Spain) J Arrese	6	6
(Spain) G López	3	2^{r}
WC	(Italy) M Cierro	6	4
(France) F Fontang	6	6
(Italy) R Furlan	2	3

Quarterfinals
WC	(France) Y Noah	2	6	4
(Spain) J Arrese	6	4	6
WC	(Italy) M Cierro	1	6^{1}
(France) F Fontang	6	7^{7}

Semifinals
(Spain) J Arrese	3	6	6^{5}
(France) F Fontang	6	2	7^{7}
