= 1992 Mercedes Cup – Singles =

Singles
- 1992 Mercedes Cup

Final
- Champion: (Commonwealth of Independent States) Andrei Medvedev
- Runner-up: (South Africa) Wayne Ferreira
- Score: 6–1, 6–4, 6–7^{(5–7)}, 2–6, 6–1

Details
- Draw: 48 (4WC/6Q)
- Seeds: 16

Events
Singles	Doubles
- Stuttgart Open

Michael Stich was the defending champion, but lost in the third round to Thomas Muster.

17-year old Andrei Medvedev, who entered the tournament as a qualifier, won the title by defeating Wayne Ferreira 6–1, 6–4, 6–7^{(5–7)}, 2–6, 6–1 in the final.

== Seeds ==
All seeds received a bye to the second round.

1. (Sweden) Stefan Edberg (quarterfinals)
2. (Socialist Federal Republic of Yugoslavia) Goran Ivanišević (quarterfinals)
3. (Germany) Boris Becker (second round)
4. (United States) Michael Chang (second round)
5. (Germany) Michael Stich (third round)
6. (Spain) Carlos Costa (quarterfinals)
7. (South Africa) Wayne Ferreira (final)
8. (Commonwealth of Independent States) Alexander Volkov (second round)
9. (Spain) Emilio Sánchez (third round)
10. (Spain) Sergi Bruguera (third round)
11. (Argentina) Alberto Mancini (third round)
12. (Austria) Thomas Muster (semifinals)
13. (Spain) Francisco Clavet (third round)
14. (Czechoslovakia) Karel Nováček (semifinals)
15. (Commonwealth of Independent States) Andrei Cherkasov (third round)
16. (Spain) Javier Sánchez (third round)

== Draw ==
Key

- Q = Qualifier
- WC = Wild card
- LL = Lucky loser
- Alt = Alternate
- ITF = ITF entry
- PR = Protected ranking
- SR = Special ranking
- SE = Special exempt
- JE = Junior exempt
- JR = Junior Accelerator Programme entrant
- CO = College Accelerator Programme entrant
- NG = Next Gen Accelerator Program entrant
- w/o = Walkover
- r = Retired
- d = Defaulted

=== Finals ===
Quarterfinals
1	(Sweden) Stefan Edberg	6	4	4
Q	(Commonwealth of Independent States) Andrei Medvedev	1	6	6
Q	(Germany) Bernd Karbacher	6	1	3
12	(Austria) Thomas Muster	3	6	6
6	(Spain) Carlos Costa	2	6^{5}
14	(Czechoslovakia) Karel Nováček	6	7^{7}
7	(South Africa) Wayne Ferreira	6	6^{7}	6
2	(Socialist Federal Republic of Yugoslavia) Goran Ivanišević	3	7^{9}	4

Semifinals
Q	(Commonwealth of Independent States) Andrei Medvedev	6	6
12	(Austria) Thomas Muster	2	2
14	(Czechoslovakia) Karel Nováček	3	2
7	(South Africa) Wayne Ferreira	6	6

Final
Q	(Commonwealth of Independent States) Andrei Medvedev	6	6	6^{5}	2	6
7	(South Africa) Wayne Ferreira	1	4	7^{7}	6	1

=== Top half ===
==== Section 1 ====
First round
(Argentina) C Miniussi	6	4	6
(Argentina) G Pérez Roldán	3	6	3
(Commonwealth of Independent States) A Chesnokov	7^{7}	7^{8}
Q	(Spain) J Burillo	6^{0}	6^{6}
(France) T Champion	4	4
(Argentina) F Davín	6	6
Q	(Commonwealth of Independent States) A Medvedev	3	7	6
(Socialist Federal Republic of Yugoslavia) G Prpić	6	5	0

Second round
1	(Sweden) S Edberg	7	6
(Argentina) C Miniussi	5	2
(Commonwealth of Independent States) A Chesnokov	6	6^{0}	5
16	(Spain) J Sánchez	4	7^{7}	7
9	(Spain) E Sánchez	6	6
(Argentina) F Davín	2	4
Q	(Commonwealth of Independent States) A Medvedev	6	6
8	(Commonwealth of Independent States) A Volkov	4	2

Third round
1	(Sweden) S Edberg	2	7^{12}	6
16	(Spain) J Sánchez	6	6^{10}	2
9	(Spain) E Sánchez	6^{3}	2
Q	(Commonwealth of Independent States) A Medvedev	7^{7}	6

Quarterfinals
1	(Sweden) S Edberg	6	4	4
Q	(Commonwealth of Independent States) A Medvedev	1	6	6

==== Section 2 ====
First round
(Spain) F Roig	2	4
Q	(Germany) B Karbacher	6	6
(France) F Fontang	4	1
(Germany) CU Steeb	6	6
(Switzerland) M Rosset	6	6
(France) F Santoro	1	4
WC	(France) H Leconte	6^{8}	6^{10}
Q	(Commonwealth of Independent States) A Olhovskiy	7^{10}	7^{12}

Second round
4	(United States) M Chang	4	6	3
Q	(Germany) B Karbacher	6	4	6
(Germany) CU Steeb	3	6^{6}
13	(Spain) F Clavet	6	7^{8}
12	(Austria) T Muster	6	6
(Switzerland) M Rosset	3	2
Q	(Commonwealth of Independent States) A Olhovskiy	4	5
5	(Germany) M Stich	6	7

Third round
Q	(Germany) B Karbacher	6^{7}	6	6
13	(Spain) F Clavet	7^{9}	4	4
12	(Austria) T Muster	7^{7}	6
5	(Germany) M Stich	6^{2}	4

Quarterfinals
Q	(Germany) B Karbacher	6	1	3
12	(Austria) T Muster	3	6	6

=== Bottom half ===
==== Section 3 ====
First round
(Argentina) G Markus	6	3	4
(Sweden) C Bergström	4	6	6
WC	(Germany) L Koslowski	6^{7}	1
(France) C Pioline	7^{9}	6
Q	(Spain) A Berasategui	6	6
(Sweden) A Järryd	4	3
(France) A Boetsch	4	4
(France) O Delaître	6	6

Second round
6	(Spain) C Costa	6	7^{7}
(Sweden) C Bergström	3	6^{5}
(France) C Pioline	4	7^{7}	6^{5}
11	(Argentina) A Mancini	6	6^{2}	7^{7}
14	(Czechoslovakia) K Nováček	6^{3}	7^{7}	6
Q	(Spain) A Berasategui	7^{7}	6^{5}	2
(France) O Delaître	6	6
3/WC	(Germany) B Becker	3	4

Third round
6	(Spain) C Costa	6	6
11	(Argentina) A Mancini	3	4
14	(Czechoslovakia) K Nováček	4	6	6
(France) O Delaître	6	3	4

Quarterfinals
6	(Spain) C Costa	2	6^{5}
14	(Czechoslovakia) K Nováček	6	7^{7}

==== Section 4 ====
First round
(Spain) J Arrese	6	5	5
Q	(Czechoslovakia) S Doseděl	0	7	7
(Sweden) M Gustafsson	5	5
(Italy) S Pescosolido	7	7
(Italy) R Furlan	6	6
WC	(Germany) M Naewie	2	3
(Sweden) M Larsson	5	6	6
(Italy) O Camporese	7	4	3

Second round
7	(South Africa) W Ferreira	6	7
Q	(Czechoslovakia) S Doseděl	4	5
(Italy) S Pescosolido	3	3
10	(Spain) S Bruguera	6	6
15	(Commonwealth of Independent States) A Cherkasov	7^{7}	6
(Italy) R Furlan	6^{0}	4
(Sweden) M Larsson	4	4
2	(Socialist Federal Republic of Yugoslavia) G Ivanišević	6	6

Third round
7	(South Africa) W Ferreira	7	6
10	(Spain) S Bruguera	5	3
15	(Commonwealth of Independent States) A Cherkasov	3	6^{6}
2	(Socialist Federal Republic of Yugoslavia) G Ivanišević	6	7^{8}

Quarterfinals
7	(South Africa) W Ferreira	6	6^{7}	6
2	(Socialist Federal Republic of Yugoslavia) G Ivanišević	3	7^{9}	4
