= 1987 Head Cup – Doubles =

Doubles
- 1987 Head Cup

Final
- Champions: (Spain) Sergio Casal (Spain) Emilio Sánchez
- Runners-up: (Czechoslovakia) Miloslav Mečíř (Czechoslovakia) Tomáš Šmíd
- Score: 7–6, 7–6

Details
- Draw: 32 (3WC)
- Seeds: 8

Events
Singles	Doubles
- Austrian Open Kitzbühel

Defending champions Heinz Günthardt and Tomáš Šmíd chose to compete this year with different partners, facing each other in the quarterfinals. Šmíd -teaming up with Miloslav Mečíř- defeated Günthardt -teaming up with Balázs Taróczy- in straight sets.

Mečíř and Šmíd ended up losing the final to Sergio Casal and Emilio Sánchez. The score was 7–6, 7–6. The final was played in an indoor carpet court due to bad weather.

== Seeds ==
1. (Spain) Sergio Casal / (Spain) Emilio Sánchez (champions)
2. (Czechoslovakia) Miloslav Mečíř / (Czechoslovakia) Tomáš Šmíd (final)
3. (Peru) Carlos di Laura / (United States) Blaine Willenborg (semifinals, withdrew)
4. (Australia) Carl Limberger / (Australia) Mark Woodforde (second round)
5. (Czechoslovakia) Stanislav Birner / (Czechoslovakia) Jaroslav Navrátil (quarterfinals)
6. (Australia) Broderick Dyke / (Australia) Paul McNamee (quarterfinals)
7. (United States) Bud Cox / (Australia) Michael Fancutt (second round)
8. (Haiti) Ronald Agénor / (Brazil) César Kist (quarterfinals)

== Draw ==
Key

- Q = Qualifier
- WC = Wild card
- LL = Lucky loser
- Alt = Alternate
- ITF = ITF entry
- PR = Protected ranking
- SR = Special ranking
- SE = Special exempt
- JE = Junior exempt
- JR = Junior Accelerator Programme entrant
- CO = College Accelerator Programme entrant
- NG = Next Gen Accelerator Program entrant
- w/o = Walkover
- r = Retired
- d = Defaulted

=== Finals ===
Semifinals
1	(Spain) Sergio Casal (Spain) Emilio Sánchez	6	3	7
(Czechoslovakia) Petr Korda (Czechoslovakia) Cyril Suk	3	6	6
3	(Peru) Carlos di Laura (United States) Blaine Willenborg
2	(Czechoslovakia) Miloslav Mečíř (Czechoslovakia) Tomáš Šmíd	w/o

Final
1	(Spain) Sergio Casal (Spain) Emilio Sánchez	7	7
2	(Czechoslovakia) Miloslav Mečíř (Czechoslovakia) Tomáš Šmíd	6	6

=== Top half ===
First round
1	(Spain) S Casal (Spain) E Sánchez	6
(Austria) A Antonitsch (Austria) T Muster	3	r
(France) T Champion (France) T Tulasne	1	6	4
(Peru) P Arraya (Sweden) P Lindgren	6	3	6
(Czechoslovakia) J Čihák (Czechoslovakia) R Vogel	6	6
(Australia) R Barlow (Sweden) P Svensson	3	3
WC	(Austria) M Oberleitner (Austria) Oliver Ploner	5	3
8	(Haiti) R Agénor (Brazil) C Kist	7	6
4	(Australia) C Limberger (Australia) M Woodforde	6	7
(Paraguay) V Pecci (Czechoslovakia) L Pimek	4	5
(Czechoslovakia) P Korda (Czechoslovakia) C Suk	6	6
WC	(Austria) G Mild (Austria) H Skoff	3	4
(Sweden) S Svensson (Sweden) LA Wahlgren	7	6
(United States) L Duncan (Austria) B Pils	5	2
(Sweden) C Allgårdh (Sweden) N Kroon	5	7	4
6	(Australia) B Dyke (Australia) P McNamee	7	6	6

Second round
1	(Spain) S Casal (Spain) E Sánchez	6	6
(Peru) P Arraya (Sweden) P Lindgren	3	1
(Czechoslovakia) J Čihák (Czechoslovakia) R Vogel	6	6	6
8	(Haiti) R Agénor (Brazil) C Kist	7	2	7
4	(Australia) C Limberger (Australia) M Woodforde	2	3
(Czechoslovakia) P Korda (Czechoslovakia) C Suk	6	6
(Sweden) S Svensson (Sweden) LA Wahlgren	4	6
6	(Australia) B Dyke (Australia) P McNamee	6	7

Quarterfinals
1	(Spain) S Casal (Spain) E Sánchez	6	6
8	(Haiti) R Agénor (Brazil) C Kist	1	4
(Czechoslovakia) P Korda (Czechoslovakia) C Suk	6	6
6	(Australia) B Dyke (Australia) P McNamee	4	3

Semifinals
1	(Spain) S Casal (Spain) E Sánchez	6	3	7
(Czechoslovakia) P Korda (Czechoslovakia) C Suk	3	6	6

=== Bottom half ===
First round
5	(Czechoslovakia) S Birner (Czechoslovakia) J Navrátil	7	6
(Argentina) J Frana (Argentina) C Miniussi	6	3
(Spain) J Colás (Chile) P Rebolledo	6	6
(Brazil) E Oliveira (India) S Vasudevan	4	3
(Argentina) R Argüello (Argentina) M Ingaramo	6	4
(Spain) T Carbonell (Spain) J Sánchez	7	6
(Spain) J Arrese (Spain) J Bardou	5	3
3	(Peru) C di Laura (United States) B Willenborg	7	6
7	(United States) B Cox (Australia) M Fancutt	6	6
(Sweden) U Stenlund (Sweden) F Waern	1	3
WC	(Switzerland) H Günthardt (Hungary) B Taróczy	6	6
(Portugal) J Cunha e Silva (Spain) D Marco	3	2
(Italy) C Aprili (Italy) P Canè	7	7
(Italy) S Colombo (Romania) F Segărceanu	5	6
(Italy) C Pistolesi (West Germany) H Schwaier	6	6
2	(Czechoslovakia) M Mečíř (Czechoslovakia) T Šmíd	7	7

Second round
5	(Czechoslovakia) S Birner (Czechoslovakia) J Navrátil	6	3	7
(Spain) J Colás (Chile) P Rebolledo	3	6	6
(Spain) T Carbonell (Spain) J Sánchez	6	6	3
3	(Peru) C di Laura (United States) B Willenborg	1	7	6
7	(United States) B Cox (Australia) M Fancutt	5	6	4
WC	(Switzerland) H Günthardt (Hungary) B Taróczy	7	3	6
(Italy) C Aprili (Italy) P Canè	6	4
2	(Czechoslovakia) M Mečíř (Czechoslovakia) T Šmíd	7	6

Quarterfinals
5	(Czechoslovakia) S Birner (Czechoslovakia) J Navrátil	6	7	1
3	(Peru) C di Laura (United States) B Willenborg	7	6	6
WC	(Switzerland) H Günthardt (Hungary) B Taróczy	3	4
2	(Czechoslovakia) M Mečíř (Czechoslovakia) T Šmíd	6	6

Semifinals
3	(Peru) C di Laura (United States) B Willenborg
2	(Czechoslovakia) M Mečíř (Czechoslovakia) T Šmíd	w/o
