= 1989 Bologna Open =

- Date: 12–18 June
- Edition: 5th
- Category: Grand Prix
- Draw: 32S / 16D
- Prize money: $93,400
- Surface: Clay / outdoor
- Location: Bologna, Italy
- Venue: Cierrebi Club

Champions

Singles
- (Spain) Javier Sánchez

Doubles
- (Spain) Sergio Casal / (Spain) Javier Sánchez
← 1988 ·	Bologna Outdoor	· 1990 →

The 1989 Bologna Open was a men's tennis tournament played on outdoor clay courts at the Cierrebi Club in Bologna, Italy that was part of the 1989 Nabisco Grand Prix circuit. It was the fifth edition of the tournament and was played from 12 June until 18 June 1989. Sixth-seeded Javier Sánchez won the singles title.

== Finals ==
=== Singles ===
(Spain) Javier Sánchez defeated (Argentina) Franco Davín 6–1, 6–0

- It was Sánchez' 1st singles title of the year and the 2nd of his career.

=== Doubles ===
(Spain) Sergio Casal / (Spain) Javier Sánchez defeated (Sweden) Tomas Nydahl / (Sweden) Jörgen Windahl 6–2, 6–3
