= 1989 Bologna Open – Singles =

Singles
- 1989 Bologna Open

Final
- Champion: (Spain) Javier Sánchez
- Runner-up: (Argentina) Franco Davín
- Score: 6–1, 6–0

Details
- Draw: 32 (4WC/4Q/1LL)
- Seeds: 8

Events
Singles	Doubles
← 1988 ·	Bologna Outdoor	· 1990 →

Alberto Mancini was the defending champion, but did not compete this year.

Javier Sánchez won the title by defeating Franco Davín 6–1, 6–0 in the final.

== Seeds ==
1. (Argentina) Guillermo Pérez Roldán (semifinals)
2. (Sweden) Jonas Svensson (first round)
3. (Austria) Horst Skoff (second round)
4. (Haiti) Ronald Agénor (quarterfinals)
5. (Uruguay) Marcelo Filippini (first round)
6. (Spain) Javier Sánchez (champion)
7. (Italy) Omar Camporese (quarterfinals)
8. (Netherlands) Mark Koevermans (first round)

== Draw ==
=== Key ===
- Q = Qualifier
- WC = Wild card
- LL = Lucky loser
- Alt = Alternate
- ITF = ITF entry
- PR = Protected ranking
- SR = Special ranking
- SE = Special exempt
- JE = Junior exempt
- JR = Junior Accelerator Programme entrant
- CO = College Accelerator Programme entrant
- NG = Next Gen Accelerator Program entrant
- w/o = Walkover
- r = Retired
- d = Defaulted

=== Finals ===
Semifinals
1/WC	(Argentina) Guillermo Pérez Roldán	5	1
6	(Spain) Javier Sánchez	7	6
(Argentina) Roberto Azar	3	3
(Argentina) Franco Davín	6	6

Final
6	(Spain) Javier Sánchez	6	6
(Argentina) Franco Davín	1	0

=== Top half ===
First round
1/WC	(Argentina) G Pérez Roldán	6	6
(Sweden) T Nydahl	2	2
Q	(Argentina) G Markus	6	6
WC	(Italy) S Pescosolido	3	4
(Sweden) C Allgårdh	1	0
(Switzerland) C Mezzadri	6	6
(Italy) C Panatta	0	2
7	(Italy) O Camporese	6	6
3	(Austria) H Skoff	6	3	7
(Italy) M Cierro	3	6	5
LL	(Sweden) M Larsson	4	4
(Uruguay) D Pérez	6	6
(Italy) S Colombo	1	6	6
(Sweden) J Windahl	6	1	3
(Chile) P Rebolledo	2	0
6	(Spain) J Sánchez	6	6

Second round
1/WC	(Argentina) G Pérez Roldán	6	6
Q	(Argentina) G Markus	3	3
(Switzerland) C Mezzadri	6	6	4
7	(Italy) O Camporese	3	7	6
3	(Austria) H Skoff	5	4
(Uruguay) D Pérez	7	6
(Italy) S Colombo	3	2
6	(Spain) J Sánchez	6	6

Quarterfinals
1/WC	(Argentina) G Pérez Roldán	7	4	6
7	(Italy) O Camporese	5	6	4
(Uruguay) D Pérez	3	6	5
6	(Spain) J Sánchez	6	2	7

Semifinals
1/WC	(Argentina) G Pérez Roldán	5	1
6	(Spain) J Sánchez	7	6

=== Bottom half ===
First round
5	(Uruguay) M Filippini	6	5	6
(Argentina) R Azar	3	7	7
Q	(Italy) E Mazza	4	1
(Estonia) A Võsand	6	6
(Italy) F Cancellotti	3	7	4
(Ecuador) R Viver	6	5	6
(Spain) T Carbonell	6	5
4/WC	(Haiti) R Agénor	7	7
8	(Netherlands) M Koevermans	4	2
(Argentina) F Davín	6	6
Q	(Chile) F Rivera	7	4	3
(Italy) M Narducci	6	6	6
(Peru) A Aramburú	4	6	5
Q	(Italy) P Pambianco	6	1	7
(Spain) S Casal	7	6
2/WC	(Sweden) J Svensson	6	3

Second round
(Argentina) R Azar	6	6
(Estonia) A Võsand	3	2
(Ecuador) R Viver	4	1
4/WC	(Haiti) R Agénor	6	6
(Argentina) F Davín	7	6
(Italy) M Narducci	6	1
Q	(Italy) P Pambianco	2	6	6
(Spain) S Casal	6	4	3

Quarterfinals
(Argentina) R Azar	7	6
4/WC	(Haiti) R Agénor	6	1
(Argentina) F Davín	6	6
Q	(Italy) P Pambianco	4	3

Semifinals
(Argentina) R Azar	3	3
(Argentina) F Davín	6	6
