= 1991 Campionati Internazionali di Sicilia =

- Date: 23–29 September
- Edition: 13th
- Category: World Series
- Draw: 32S / 16D
- Prize money: $270,000
- Surface: Clay / outdoor
- Location: Palermo, Italy

Champions

Singles
- (France) Frédéric Fontang

Doubles
- (Netherlands) Jacco Eltingh / (Netherlands) Tom Kempers
- Campionati Internazionali di Sicilia

The 1991 Campionati Internazionali di Sicilia was a men's tennis tournament played on outdoor clay courts in Palermo, Italy that was part of the World Series tier of the 1991 ATP Tour. It was the 13th edition of the tournament and took place from 23 September until 29 September 1991. Unseeded Frédéric Fontang won the singles title.

== Finals ==
=== Singles ===
(France) Frédéric Fontang defeated (Spain) Emilio Sánchez 1–6, 6–3, 6–3

- It was Fontang's only singles title of his career.

=== Doubles ===
(Netherlands) Jacco Eltingh / (Netherlands) Tom Kempers defeated (Spain) Emilio Sánchez / (Spain) Javier Sánchez 3–6, 6–3, 6–3

- It was Eltingh's 1st doubles title of the year and of his career. It was Kempers' only doubles title of the year and the 1st of his career.
