= 1987 Bordeaux Open – Singles =

Singles
- 1987 Bordeaux Open

Final
- Champion: (Spain) Emilio Sánchez
- Runner-up: (Haiti) Ronald Agénor
- Score: 5–7, 6–4, 6–4

Details
- Draw: 32 (3WC/4Q)
- Seeds: 8

Events
Singles	Doubles
- ATP Bordeaux

Paolo Canè was the defending champion, but did not compete this year.

Emilio Sánchez won the title by defeating Ronald Agénor 5–7, 6–4, 6–4 in the final.

== Seeds ==
1. (France) Yannick Noah (first round)
2. (Spain) Emilio Sánchez (champion)
3. (Spain) Sergio Casal (second round)
4. (France) Jean-Philippe Fleurian (first round)
5. (Haiti) Ronald Agénor (final)
6. (Brazil) Luiz Mattar (second round)
7. (Spain) David de Miguel (quarterfinals)
8. (Italy) Simone Colombo (second round, retired)

== Draw ==
Key

- Q = Qualifier
- WC = Wild card
- LL = Lucky loser
- Alt = Alternate
- ITF = ITF entry
- PR = Protected ranking
- SR = Special ranking
- SE = Special exempt
- JE = Junior exempt
- JR = Junior Accelerator Programme entrant
- CO = College Accelerator Programme entrant
- NG = Next Gen Accelerator Program entrant
- w/o = Walkover
- r = Retired
- d = Defaulted

=== Finals ===
Semifinals
(New Zealand) Bruce Derlin	1	3
5	(Haiti) Ronald Agénor	6	6
Q	(Spain) Gabriel Urpí	1	2
2	(Spain) Emilio Sánchez	6	6

Final
5	(Haiti) Ronald Agénor	7	4	4
2	(Spain) Emilio Sánchez	5	6	6

=== Top half ===
First round
1	(France) Y Noah	6	4	2
(United Kingdom) J Bates	2	6	6
WC	(France) L Courteau	6	1	0
(New Zealand) B Derlin	3	6	6
(Sweden) LA Wahlgren	6	4	6
(Czechoslovakia) S Birner	4	6	4
(Sweden) P Carlsson	6	3
7	(Spain) D de Miguel	7	6
3	(Spain) S Casal	6	4	6
(Argentina) R Azar	2	6	1
Q	(United Kingdom) S Shaw	6	6
(Italy) A de Minicis	4	3
(Italy) C Aprili	3	6	1
(Australia) D Cahill	6	3	6
(Spain) J Aguilera	6	3	4
5	(Haiti) R Agénor	4	6	6

Second round
(United Kingdom) J Bates	6	4	7
(New Zealand) B Derlin	0	6	9
(Sweden) LA Wahlgren	6	0
7	(Spain) D de Miguel	7	6
3	(Spain) S Casal	4	6
Q	(United Kingdom) S Shaw	6	7
(Australia) D Cahill	6	6	3
5	(Haiti) R Agénor	7	4	6

Quarterfinals
(New Zealand) B Derlin	6	1	6
7	(Spain) D de Miguel	3	6	1
Q	(United Kingdom) S Shaw	6	7	4
5	(Haiti) R Agénor	7	6	6

Semifinals
(New Zealand) B Derlin	1	3
5	(Haiti) R Agénor	6	6

=== Bottom half ===
First round
6	(Brazil) L Mattar	6	6
(West Germany) I Werner	2	3
Q	(Spain) G Urpí	7	6
Q	(Argentina) G Giussani	5	2
(Italy) M Cierro	3	6	6
(Austria) B Pils	6	2	4
(Australia) M Woodforde	1	6	7
4/WC	(France) JP Fleurian	6	1	5
8	(Italy) S Colombo	6	3	6
WC	(France) David Bétous	4	6	3
(Australia) P Carter	2	2
(France) T Champion	6	6
Q	(Spain) J Bardou	6	6
(West Germany) HD Beutel	4	0
(Argentina) R Argüello	1	2
2	(Spain) E Sánchez	6	6

Second round
6	(Brazil) L Mattar	4	2
Q	(Spain) G Urpí	6	6
(Italy) M Cierro	7	6
(Australia) M Woodforde	6	3
8	(Italy) S Colombo	5	r
(France) T Champion	7
Q	(Spain) J Bardou	2	3
2	(Spain) E Sánchez	6	6

Quarterfinals
Q	(Spain) G Urpí	6	7
(Italy) M Cierro	2	6
(France) T Champion	4	2
2	(Spain) E Sánchez	6	6

Semifinals
Q	(Spain) G Urpí	1	2
2	(Spain) E Sánchez	6	6
