= 1988 Bologna Open – Singles =

Singles
- 1988 Bologna Open

Final
- Champion: (Argentina) Alberto Mancini
- Runner-up: (Spain) Emilio Sánchez
- Score: 7–5, 7–6^{(7–4)}

Details
- Draw: 32 (3WC/4Q)
- Seeds: 8

Events
Singles	Doubles
- Bologna Outdoor

Kent Carlsson was the defending champion, but was forced to withdraw before his semifinals match due to an achilles tendon injury.

Alberto Mancini won the title by defeating Emilio Sánchez 7–5, 7–6^{(7–4)} in the final.

== Seeds ==
1. (Sweden) Kent Carlsson (semifinals, withdrew due to an achilles tendon injury)
2. (Spain) Emilio Sánchez (final)
3. (Argentina) Martín Jaite (semifinals)
4. (West Germany) Tore Meinecke (first round)
5. (Argentina) Alberto Mancini (champion)
6. (West Germany) Ricki Osterthun (second round)
7. (Argentina) Christian Miniussi (first round)
8. (Italy) Massimiliano Narducci (first round)

== Draw ==
Key

- Q = Qualifier
- WC = Wild card
- LL = Lucky loser
- Alt = Alternate
- ITF = ITF entry
- PR = Protected ranking
- SR = Special ranking
- SE = Special exempt
- JE = Junior exempt
- JR = Junior Accelerator Programme entrant
- CO = College Accelerator Programme entrant
- NG = Next Gen Accelerator Program entrant
- w/o = Walkover
- r = Retired
- d = Defaulted

=== Finals ===
Semifinals
1	(Sweden) Kent Carlsson
5	(Argentina) Alberto Mancini	w/o
3	(Argentina) Martín Jaite	3	1
2	(Spain) Emilio Sánchez	6	6

Final
5	(Argentina) Alberto Mancini	7	7^{7}
2	(Spain) Emilio Sánchez	5	6^{4}

=== Top half ===
First round
1	(Sweden) K Carlsson	6	6
(West Germany) M Rackl	2	0
(Spain) J Aguilera	3	6	6
WC	(Italy) C Panatta	6	2	2
WC	(Italy) A Baldoni	4	4
(Italy) O Camporese	6	6
Q	(Mexico) F Maciel	6	6
8	(Italy) M Narducci	3	1
4	(West Germany) T Meinecke	6	5	4
(West Germany) D Keretić	1	7	6
(Mexico) A Moreno	5	4
(Uruguay) M Filippini	7	6
Q	(Argentina) R Azar	3	6	1
(Argentina) F Yunis	6	3	6
(Italy) M Cierro	4	6	3
5	(Argentina) A Mancini	6	3	6

Second round
1	(Sweden) K Carlsson	6	6
(Spain) J Aguilera	0	2
(Italy) O Camporese	7	7
Q	(Mexico) F Maciel	5	6
(West Germany) D Keretić	4	4
(Uruguay) M Filippini	6	6
(Argentina) F Yunis	1	1
5	(Argentina) A Mancini	6	6

Quarterfinals
1	(Sweden) K Carlsson	6	7
(Italy) O Camporese	3	5
(Uruguay) M Filippini	6	3	4
5	(Argentina) A Mancini	4	6	6

Semifinals
1	(Sweden) K Carlsson
5	(Argentina) A Mancini	w/o

=== Bottom half ===
First round
6	(West Germany) R Osterthun	6	1	7
WC	(Argentina) G Vilas	2	6	6
(Sweden) P Lindgren	3	2
(Spain) T Carbonell	6	6
(Uruguay) D Pérez	6	1	4
(Sweden) U Stenlund	3	6	6
Q	(Brazil) M Hennemann	1	1
3	(Argentina) M Jaite	6	6
7	(Argentina) C Miniussi	1	7	5
(Spain) J Sánchez	6	5	7
(Peru) P Arraya	6	6
(Italy) P Canè	4	4
(Italy) C Pistolesi	6	6
Q	(Italy) A de Minicis	0	3
(Italy) F Cancellotti	0	6	0
2	(Spain) E Sánchez	6	3	6

Second round
6	(West Germany) R Osterthun	4	5
(Spain) T Carbonell	6	7
(Sweden) U Stenlund	4	0
3	(Argentina) M Jaite	6	6
(Spain) J Sánchez	2	7	6
(Peru) P Arraya	6	6	3
(Italy) C Pistolesi	6	3	2
2	(Spain) E Sánchez	3	6	6

Quarterfinals
(Spain) T Carbonell	2	4
3	(Argentina) M Jaite	6	6
(Spain) J Sánchez	3	4
2	(Spain) E Sánchez	6	6

Semifinals
3	(Argentina) M Jaite	3	1
2	(Spain) E Sánchez	6	6
