= 1987 Head Cup =

- Date: 3–9 August
- Edition: 17th
- Category: Grand Prix
- Draw: 64S / 32D
- Prize money: $175,000
- Surface: Clay / outdoor
- Location: Kitzbühel Austria
- Venue: Tennis stadium Kitzbühel

Champions

Singles
- (Spain) Emilio Sánchez

Doubles
- (Spain) Sergio Casal / (Spain) Emilio Sánchez
- Austrian Open Kitzbühel

The 1987 Head Cup, also known as the 1987 Austrian Open Kitzbühel, was a men's tennis tournament played on outdoor clay courts that was part of the 1987 Nabisco Grand Prix. It was the 17th edition of the tournament and took place at the Tennis stadium Kitzbühel in Kitzbühel, Austria, from 3 August until 9 August 1987. Second-seeded Emilio Sánchez won the singles title.

== Finals ==
=== Singles ===
(Spain) Emilio Sánchez defeated (Czechoslovakia) Miloslav Mečíř, 6–4, 6–1, 4–6, 6–1

- It was Sánchez' 3rd singles title of the year and the 6th of his career.

=== Doubles ===
(Spain) Sergio Casal / (Spain) Emilio Sánchez defeated (Czechoslovakia) Miloslav Mečíř / (Czechoslovakia) Tomáš Šmíd, 7–6, 7–6
