= 1992 Mercedes Cup =

- Date: 13–19 July
- Edition: 15th
- Category: Championship Series
- Draw: 48S / 24D
- Prize money: $865,000
- Surface: Clay / outdoor
- Location: Stuttgart, Germany
- Venue: Tennis Club Weissenhof

Champions

Singles
- (Commonwealth of Independent States) Andrei Medvedev

Doubles
- (United States) Glenn Layendecker / (South Africa) Byron Talbot
- Stuttgart Open

The 1992 Mercedes Cup, was a men's tennis tournament played on outdoor clay courts and held at the Tennis Club Weissenhof in Stuttgart, Germany that was part of the Championship Series of the 1992 ATP Tour. It was the 15th edition of the tournament was held from 13 July until 19 July 1992. Unseeded qualifier Andrei Medvedev won the singles title.

== Finals ==
=== Singles ===
(Commonwealth of Independent States) Andrei Medvedev defeated (South Africa) Wayne Ferreira, 6–1, 6–4, 6–7^{(5–7)}, 2–6, 6–1

- It was Medvedev's 2nd singles title of the year and of his career.

=== Doubles ===
(United States) Glenn Layendecker / (South Africa) Byron Talbot defeated (Switzerland) Marc Rosset / (Spain) Javier Sánchez, 4–6, 6–3, 6–4
