= 1987 Bordeaux Open – Doubles =

Doubles
- 1987 Bordeaux Open

Final
- Champions: (Spain) Sergio Casal (Spain) Emilio Sánchez
- Runners-up: (Australia) Darren Cahill (Australia) Mark Woodforde
- Score: 6–3, 6–3

Details
- Draw: 16 (1WC)
- Seeds: 4

Events
| Singles | Doubles |
- ATP Bordeaux

Jordi Arrese and David de Miguel were the defending champions, but Arrese did not compete this year. De Miguel teamed up with Jorge Bardou and lost in the quarterfinals to Darren Cahill and Mark Woodforde.

Sergio Casal and Emilio Sánchez won the title by defeating Cahill and Woodforde 6–3, 6–3 in the final.

== Seeds ==
1. (Spain) Sergio Casal / (Spain) Emilio Sánchez (champions)
2. (Australia) Darren Cahill / (Australia) Mark Woodforde (final)
3. (Czechoslovakia) Stanislav Birner / (Italy) Alessandro de Minicis (quarterfinals)
4. (France) Loïc Courteau / (France) Jean-Philippe Fleurian (quarterfinals)

== Draw ==
Key

- Q = Qualifier
- WC = Wild card
- LL = Lucky loser
- Alt = Alternate
- ITF = ITF entry
- PR = Protected ranking
- SR = Special ranking
- SE = Special exempt
- JE = Junior exempt
- JR = Junior Accelerator Programme entrant
- CO = College Accelerator Programme entrant
- NG = Next Gen Accelerator Program entrant
- w/o = Walkover
- r = Retired
- d = Defaulted

=== Draw ===
First round
1 | (Spain) S Casal (Spain) E Sánchez | 6 | 6
(Argentina) R Argüello (Argentina) R Azar | 0 | 1
(United States) B Buffington (Australia) D Tyson | 4 | 6
(New Zealand) B Derlin (West Germany) I Werner | 6 | 7
3 | (Czechoslovakia) S Birner (Italy) A de Minicis | 6 | 6
(France) B Dadillon (France) J Potier | 4 | 4
(Italy) N Devide (Austria) B Pils | 6 | 6
(France) C Lesage (France) JM Piacentile | 4 | 4
(United Kingdom) J Bates (United Kingdom) S Shaw | 1 | 6 | 3
(Australia) R Fricker (Australia) G Pfitzner | 6 | 2 | 6
(Italy) C Aprili (Italy) M Cierro | 3 | 2
4 | (France) L Courteau (France) JP Fleurian | 6 | 6
(Sweden) P Carlsson (Sweden) LA Wahlgren | 4 | 4
(Spain) J Bardou (Spain) D de Miguel | 6 | 6
WC | (France) Pascal Aucouturier (France) David Bétous | 1 | 3
2 | (Australia) D Cahill (Australia) M Woodforde | 6 | 6

Quarterfinals
1 | (Spain) S Casal (Spain) E Sánchez | 6 | 6
(New Zealand) B Derlin (West Germany) I Werner | 2 | 3
3 | (Czechoslovakia) S Birner (Italy) A de Minicis | 6 | 6
(Italy) N Devide (Austria) B Pils | 7 | 7
(Australia) R Fricker (Australia) G Pfitzner | 6 | 6
4 | (France) L Courteau (France) JP Fleurian | 3 | 1
(Spain) J Bardou (Spain) D de Miguel | 5 | 4
2 | (Australia) D Cahill (Australia) M Woodforde | 7 | 6

Semifinals
1 | (Spain) S Casal (Spain) E Sánchez | 7 | 6
(Italy) N Devide (Austria) B Pils | 6 | 2
(Australia) R Fricker (Australia) G Pfitzner | 3 | 3
2 | (Australia) D Cahill (Australia) M Woodforde | 6 | 6

Final
1 | (Spain) S Casal (Spain) E Sánchez | 6 | 6
2 | (Australia) D Cahill (Australia) M Woodforde | 3 | 3
