= 1992 Mercedes Cup – Doubles =

Doubles
- 1992 Mercedes Cup

Final
- Champions: (United States) Glenn Layendecker (South Africa) Byron Talbot
- Runners-up: (Switzerland) Marc Rosset (Spain) Javier Sánchez
- Score: 4–6, 6–3, 6–4

Details
- Draw: 24 (2WC/1Q)
- Seeds: 8

Events
Singles	Doubles
- Stuttgart Open

Wally Masur and Emilio Sánchez were the defending champions, but Masur did not compete this year. Emilio Sánchez teamed up with Sergio Casal and lost in the quarterfinals to Stefan Edberg and Anders Järryd.

Glenn Layendecker and Byron Talbot won the title by defeating Marc Rosset and Javier Sánchez 4–6, 6–3, 6–4 in the final.

== Seeds ==
All seeds received a bye to the second round.

1. (Netherlands) Tom Nijssen / (Czechoslovakia) Cyril Suk (quarterfinals)
2. (Spain) Sergio Casal / (Spain) Emilio Sánchez (quarterfinals)
3. (Switzerland) Marc Rosset / (Spain) Javier Sánchez (final)
4. (South Africa) Wayne Ferreira / (South Africa) Piet Norval (quarterfinals)
5. (South Africa) David Adams / (Commonwealth of Independent States) Andrei Olhovskiy (semifinals)
6. (Czechoslovakia) Libor Pimek / (South Africa) Danie Visser (second round)
7. (Germany) Boris Becker / (Germany) Michael Stich (second round)
8. (Italy) Omar Camporese / (Czechoslovakia) Karel Nováček (second round)

== Draw ==
Key

- Q = Qualifier
- WC = Wild card
- LL = Lucky loser
- Alt = Alternate
- ITF = ITF entry
- PR = Protected ranking
- SR = Special ranking
- SE = Special exempt
- JE = Junior exempt
- JR = Junior Accelerator Programme entrant
- CO = College Accelerator Programme entrant
- NG = Next Gen Accelerator Program entrant
- w/o = Walkover
- r = Retired
- d = Defaulted

=== Finals ===
Semifinals
(United States) Glenn Layendecker (South Africa) Byron Talbot	3	6	6
5	(South Africa) David Adams (Commonwealth of Independent States) Andrei Olhovskiy	6	2	4
3	(Switzerland) Marc Rosset (Spain) Javier Sánchez	5	6	6
(Sweden) Stefan Edberg (Sweden) Anders Järryd	7	4	4

Final
(United States) Glenn Layendecker (South Africa) Byron Talbot	4	6	6
3	(Switzerland) Marc Rosset (Spain) Javier Sánchez	6	3	4

=== Top half ===
First round
(Spain) F Clavet (Spain) C Costa	7	6
(Mexico) J Lozano (Germany) U Riglewski	5	2
(United States) G Layendecker (South Africa) B Talbot	6	6
(United Kingdom) N Broad (South Africa) S Kruger	3	1
(Brazil) L Mattar (Brazil) J Oncins	6	2	6
(Argentina) C Miniussi (Uruguay) D Pérez	3	6	3
(Czechoslovakia) V Flégl (Czechoslovakia) T Anzari	7	2	r
(Austria) T Muster (Italy) S Pescosolido	6	6

Second round
1	(Netherlands) T Nijssen (Czech Republic) C Suk	6	6
(Spain) F Clavet (Spain) C Costa	2	3
(United States) G Layendecker (South Africa) B Talbot	6	6
8	(Italy) O Camporese (Czechoslovakia) K Nováček	3	4
4	(South Africa) W Ferreira (South Africa) P Norval	6	6
(Brazil) L Mattar (Brazil) J Oncins	1	4
(Austria) T Muster (Italy) S Pescosolido	5	4
5	(South Africa) D Adams (Commonwealth of Independent States) A Olhovskiy	7	6

Quarterfinals
1	(Netherlands) T Nijssen (Czech Republic) C Suk	1	4
(United States) G Layendecker (South Africa) B Talbot	6	6
4	(South Africa) W Ferreira (South Africa) P Norval	5	6	3
5	(South Africa) D Adams (Commonwealth of Independent States) A Olhovskiy	7	3	6

Semifinals
(United States) G Layendecker (South Africa) B Talbot	3	6	6
5	(South Africa) D Adams (Commonwealth of Independent States) A Olhovskiy	6	2	4

=== Bottom half ===
First round
(Socialist Federal Republic of Yugoslavia) G Ivanišević (Socialist Federal Republic of Yugoslavia) G Prpić	6	2	5
(Netherlands) T Kempers (Netherlands) M Oosting	2	6	7
WC	(Germany) L Koslowski (Germany) M Naewie	5	5
(Latvia) Ģ Dzelde (Germany) CU Steeb	7	7
(Sweden) S Edberg (Sweden) A Järryd	7	2	6
(Commonwealth of Independent States) A Cherkasov (Commonwealth of Independent States) A Medvedev	5	6	2
WC	(Argentina) H de la Peña (Nigeria) N Odizor	6	2	4
(Argentina) P Albano (Brazil) C Motta	4	6	6

Second round
6	(Czechoslovakia) L Pimek (South Africa) D Visser	3	6
(Netherlands) T Kempers (Netherlands) M Oosting	6	7
(Latvia) Ģ Dzelde (Germany) CU Steeb	2	5
3	(Switzerland) M Rosset (Spain) J Sánchez	6	7
7	(Germany) B Becker (Germany) M Stich	3	6
(Sweden) S Edberg (Sweden) A Järryd	6	7
(Argentina) P Albano (Brazil) C Motta	3	4
2	(Spain) S Casal (Spain) E Sánchez	6	6

Quarterfinals
(Netherlands) T Kempers (Netherlands) M Oosting	5	4
3	(Switzerland) M Rosset (Spain) J Sánchez	7	6
(Sweden) S Edberg (Sweden) A Järryd	6	6
2	(Spain) S Casal (Spain) E Sánchez	4	3

Semifinals
3	(Switzerland) M Rosset (Spain) J Sánchez	5	6	6
(Sweden) S Edberg (Sweden) A Järryd	7	4	4
