= Rolf Hertzog =

Swiss tennis player

- Country (sports): Switzerland
- Born: 25 April 1968 (age 58) Zürich, Switzerland
- Height: 5 ft 10 in (178 cm)
- Plays: Right-handed
- Prize money: $21,863

Singles
- Career record: 1–4
- Highest ranking: No. 205 (11 July 1988)

Doubles
- Career record: 4–7
- Highest ranking: No. 181 (13 June 1988)

Rolf Hertzog (born 25 April 1968) is a Swiss former professional tennis player.

Hertzog, a Zürich native, won four Swiss junior championship and had a win over Petr Korda at the junior French Open in 1986, where he reached the quarter-finals. He won the Port Washington international junior championships in 1987.

During the late 1980s he featured on the Grand Prix tennis circuit, where his appearances included a first round loss to Stefan Edberg at Basel in 1986 and a win over Paolo Canè to make the second round at Gstaad in 1988. He was a doubles finalist partnering Marc Walder at the 1988 Bologna Open.

== Grand Prix finals ==
=== Doubles (0–1) ===
Result	W-L	Date	Tournament	Surface	Partner	Opponents	Score
Loss	0–1	Jun 1988	Bologna, Italy	Clay	(Switzerland) Marc Walder	(Spain) Emilio Sánchez (Spain) Javier Sánchez	1–6, 6–7

== ATP Challenger finals ==
=== Doubles: 1 (0–1) ===
Result	W-L	Date	Tournament	Surface	Partner	Opponents	Score
Loss	0–1	Dec 1988	Münster, West Germany	Carpet	(Socialist Federal Republic of Yugoslavia) Goran Prpić	(Soviet Union) Andrei Olhovskiy (Soviet Union) Alexander Volkov	2–6, 0–6
