= 1987 Madrid Tennis Grand Prix – Singles =

Singles
- 1987 Madrid Tennis Grand Prix

Final
- Champion: (Spain) Emilio Sánchez
- Runner-up: (Spain) Javier Sánchez
- Score: 6–3, 3–6, 6–2

Details
- Draw: 32 (3WC/4Q)
- Seeds: 8

Events
Singles	Doubles
- Madrid Tennis Grand Prix

Joakim Nyström was the defending champion but chose to compete at Geneva during the same week, losing to Claudio Mezzadri in the second round.

Emilio Sánchez won the title by defeating his brother Javier Sánchez 6–3, 3–6, 6–2 in the final.

== Seeds ==
1. (Spain) Emilio Sánchez (champion)
2. (Spain) Sergio Casal (first round)
3. (Spain) Alberto Tous (second round)
4. (Chile) Pedro Rebolledo (quarterfinals)
5. (Argentina) Francisco Yunis (first round)
6. (Spain) Javier Sánchez (final)
7. (Sweden) Christian Bergström (quarterfinals)
8. (Argentina) Christian Miniussi (second round)

== Draw ==
Key

- Q = Qualifier
- WC = Wild card
- LL = Lucky loser
- Alt = Alternate
- ITF = ITF entry
- PR = Protected ranking
- SR = Special ranking
- SE = Special exempt
- JE = Junior exempt
- JR = Junior Accelerator Programme entrant
- CO = College Accelerator Programme entrant
- NG = Next Gen Accelerator Program entrant
- w/o = Walkover
- r = Retired
- d = Defaulted

=== Finals ===
Semifinals
1	(Spain) Emilio Sánchez	7	6
(Argentina) Franco Davín	5	1
6	(Spain) Javier Sánchez	6	6
(Sweden) Jörgen Windahl	3	4

Final
1	(Spain) Emilio Sánchez	6	3	6
6	(Spain) Javier Sánchez	3	6	2

=== Top half ===
First round
1	(Spain) E Sánchez	6	7
(Sweden) M Gustafsson	2	5
WC	(Spain) F Luna	5	4
(Mexico) F Maciel	7	6
(Argentina) M Ingaramo	1	6	6
Q	(Spain) J Aguilera	6	3	7
(United States) M Buckley	1	2
8	(Argentina) C Miniussi	6	6
3	(Spain) A Tous	6	6
WC	(Spain) E Vázquez Barreira	1	0
(Brazil) C Kist	3	7	5
(Argentina) F Davín	6	5	7
Q	(Spain) J Bardou	6	6
(United States) R Reneberg	3	3
(United States) L Duncan	6	6
5	(Argentina) F Yunis	0	2

Second round
1	(Spain) E Sánchez	6	4	6
(Mexico) F Maciel	3	6	4
Q	(Spain) J Aguilera	6	6
8	(Argentina) C Miniussi	4	2
3	(Spain) A Tous	7	2	6
(Argentina) F Davín	5	6	7
Q	(Spain) J Bardou	6	6
(United States) L Duncan	4	2

Quarterfinals
1	(Spain) E Sánchez	6	6
Q	(Spain) J Aguilera	3	0
(Argentina) F Davín	3	7	6
Q	(Spain) J Bardou	6	5	1

Semifinals
1	(Spain) E Sánchez	7	6
(Argentina) F Davín	5	1

=== Bottom half ===
First round
6	(Spain) J Sánchez	6	6
(Peru) C di Laura	0	1
(Spain) J Arrese	6	6
(Sweden) LA Wahlgren	2	4
Q	(Mexico) L Lavalle	7	6
(Peru) P Arraya	5	4
Q	(Argentina) A Mancini	2	0
4	(Chile) P Rebolledo	6	6
7	(Sweden) C Bergström	6	6
(United States) M Dickson	4	1
WC	(Paraguay) V Pecci	7	6
(United Kingdom) S Shaw	5	3
(Sweden) N Kroon	2	5
(Sweden) J Windahl	6	7
(Argentina) R Argüello	7	7
2	(Spain) S Casal	5	6

Second round
6	(Spain) J Sánchez	7	7
(Spain) J Arrese	6	6
Q	(Mexico) L Lavalle	1	4
4	(Chile) P Rebolledo	6	6
7	(Sweden) C Bergström	6	1
WC	(Paraguay) V Pecci	4	0^{r}
(Sweden) J Windahl	3	6	6
(Argentina) R Argüello	6	3	1

Quarterfinals
6	(Spain) J Sánchez	6	6
4	(Chile) P Rebolledo	4	4
7	(Sweden) C Bergström	2	5
(Sweden) J Windahl	6	7

Semifinals
6	(Spain) J Sánchez	6	6
(Sweden) J Windahl	3	4
