= 1987 Bordeaux Open =

- Date: 13–18 July
- Edition: 10th
- Category: Grand Prix
- Draw: 32S / 16D
- Prize money: $125,000
- Surface: Clay / outdoor
- Location: Bordeaux, France
- Venue: Villa Primrose

Champions

Singles
- (Spain) Emilio Sánchez

Doubles
- (Spain) Sergio Casal / (Spain) Emilio Sánchez
- Bordeaux Open

The 1987 Bordeaux Open also known as the Nabisco Grand Prix Passing Shot was a men's tennis tournament played on clay courts at Villa Primrose in Bordeaux, France that was part of the 1987 Nabisco Grand Prix circuit. It was the 10th edition of the tournament and was held from 13 July through 18 July 1987. Second-seeded Emilio Sánchez won the singles title.

== Finals ==
=== Singles ===
(Spain) Emilio Sánchez defeated (Haiti) Ronald Agénor 5–7, 6–4, 6–4

- It was Sánchez' 2nd singles title of the year and the 5th of his career.

=== Doubles ===
(Spain) Sergio Casal / (Spain) Emilio Sánchez defeated (Australia) Darren Cahill / (Australia) Mark Woodforde 6–3, 6–3
