= 1987 Madrid Tennis Grand Prix – Doubles =

Doubles
- 1987 Madrid Tennis Grand Prix

Final
- Champions: (Peru) Carlos di Laura (Spain) Javier Sánchez
- Runners-up: (Spain) Sergio Casal (Spain) Emilio Sánchez
- Score: 6–3, 3–6, 6–4

Details
- Draw: 16
- Seeds: 4

Events
| Singles | Doubles |
- Madrid Tennis Grand Prix

Anders Järryd and Joakim Nyström were the defending champions, but none competed this year. Nyström chose to compete at Geneva during the same week, while Järryd opted to rest after winning the US Open alongside Stefan Edberg.

Carlos di Laura and Javier Sánchez won the title by defeating Sergio Casal and Emilio Sánchez 6–3, 3–6, 6–4 in the final.

== Seeds ==
1. (Spain) Sergio Casal / (Spain) Emilio Sánchez (final)
2. (Peru) Carlos di Laura / (Spain) Javier Sánchez (champions)
3. (Brazil) Nelson Aerts / (United States) Derek Tarr (first round)
4. (Sweden) Lars-Anders Wahlgren / (Sweden) Jörgen Windahl (quarterfinals)

== Draw ==
Key

- Q = Qualifier
- WC = Wild card
- LL = Lucky loser
- Alt = Alternate
- ITF = ITF entry
- PR = Protected ranking
- SR = Special ranking
- SE = Special exempt
- JE = Junior exempt
- JR = Junior Accelerator Programme entrant
- CO = College Accelerator Programme entrant
- NG = Next Gen Accelerator Program entrant
- w/o = Walkover
- r = Retired
- d = Defaulted

=== Draw ===
First round
1 | (Spain) S Casal (Spain) E Sánchez | 6 | 3 | 6
(Spain) J Aguilera (Spain) A Tous | 2 | 6 | 3
(Spain) J Arrese (Spain) J Bardou | 6 | 6
(Mexico) L Lavalle (Mexico) F Maciel | 3 | 4
4 | (Sweden) LA Wahlgren (Sweden) J Windahl | 6 | 6
(Sweden) M Gustafsson (Sweden) N Kroon | 3 | 4
(United States) B Dickinson (Argentina) R Saad | 6 | 7
(Brazil) C Kist (Mexico) A Moreno | 2 | 6
(United States) M Dickson (United States) L Duncan | 6 | 3 | 6
(South Africa) C Campbell (United States) R Reneberg | 3 | 6 | 2
(Peru) P Arraya (Argentina) C Miniussi | 2 | 6 | 6
3 | (Brazil) N Aerts (United States) D Tarr | 6 | 0 | 3
(Argentina) M Ingaramo (Chile) P Rebolledo | 6 | 7
(United States) Matthew Litsky (United States) J Treml | 4 | 6
(Brazil) G Barbosa (Brazil) M Menezes | 5 | 3
2 | (Peru) C di Laura (Spain) J Sánchez | 7 | 6

Quarterfinals
1 | (Spain) S Casal (Spain) E Sánchez | 7 | 6
(Spain) J Arrese (Spain) J Bardou | 6 | 4
4 | (Sweden) LA Wahlgren (Sweden) J Windahl | 6 | 3 | 4
(United States) B Dickinson (Argentina) R Saad | 4 | 6 | 6
(United States) M Dickson (United States) L Duncan
(Peru) P Arraya (Argentina) C Miniussi | w/o
(Argentina) M Ingaramo (Chile) P Rebolledo | 5 | 6 | 1
2 | (Peru) C di Laura (Spain) J Sánchez | 7 | 4 | 6

Semifinals
1 | (Spain) S Casal (Spain) E Sánchez | 7 | 6
(United States) B Dickinson (Argentina) R Saad | 6 | 1
(Peru) P Arraya (Argentina) C Miniussi | 3 | 6 | 6
2 | (Peru) C di Laura (Spain) J Sánchez | 6 | 3 | 7

Final
1 | (Spain) S Casal (Spain) E Sánchez | 3 | 6 | 4
2 | (Peru) C di Laura (Spain) J Sánchez | 6 | 3 | 6
