= Martin Schäffl =

Austrian tennis player

- Country (sports): Austria
- Born: 13 December 1969 (age 55)
- Prize money: $10,815

Singles
- Career record: 0–3
- Highest ranking: No. 398 (20 Apr 1992)

Doubles
- Highest ranking: No. 941 (27 Aug 1990)

Martin Schäffl (born 13 December 1969) is an Austrian former professional tennis player.

Schäffl had a career high singles ranking of 398 in the world while competing on the professional tour, with three ATP Tour main draw appearances. He played twice at his home tournament the Austrian Open Kitzbühel and qualified for the 1991 Campionati Internazionali di Sicilia in Palermo.
