= 1990 ATP Tour World Championships – Singles =

Singles
- 1990 ATP Tour World Championships

Final
- Champion: (United States) Andre Agassi
- Runner-up: (Sweden) Stefan Edberg
- Score: 5–7, 7–6^{(7–5)}, 7–5, 6–2

Details
- Draw: 8

Events
Singles	Doubles
← 1989 ·	ATP Finals	· 1991 →

Andre Agassi defeated the defending champion Stefan Edberg in the final, 5–7, 7–6^{(7–5)}, 7–5, 6–2 to win the singles title at the 1990 ATP Tour World Championships.

== Draw ==
=== Finals ===
Semifinals
1	(Sweden) Stefan Edberg	6	6
3	(Czechoslovakia) Ivan Lendl	4	2
2	(Germany) Boris Becker	2	4
4	(United States) Andre Agassi	6	6

Final
1	(Sweden) Stefan Edberg	7	6^{5}	5	2
4	(United States) Andre Agassi	5	7	7	6

=== Arthur Ashe group ===
		(Sweden) Edberg	(United States) Agassi	(United States) Sampras	(Spain) Sánchez	RR; W–L	Set; W–L	Game; W–L	Standings
1	(Sweden) Stefan Edberg		7–6^{(7–4)}, 4–6, 7–6^{(7–5)}	7–5, 6–4	6–7^{(4–7)}, 6–3, 6–1	3–0	6–2	49–38	1
4	(United States) Andre Agassi	6–7^{(4–7)}, 6–4, 6–7^{(5–7)}		6–4, 6–2	6–0, 6–3	2–1	5–2	42–27	2
5	(United States) Pete Sampras	5–7, 4–6	4–6, 2–6		6–2, 6–4	1–2	2–4	27–31	3
8	(Spain) Emilio Sánchez	7–6^{(7–4)}, 3–6, 1–6	0–6, 3–6	2–6, 4–6		0–3	1–6	20–42	4

Standings are determined by: 1. number of wins; 2. number of matches; 3. in two-players-ties, head-to-head records; 4. in three-players-ties, percentage of sets won, or of games won; 5. steering-committee decision.

=== Cliff Drysdale group ===
		(Germany) Becker	(Czechoslovakia) Lendl	(Ecuador) Gómez	(Austria) Muster	RR; W–L	Set; W–L	Game; W–L	Standings
2	(Germany) Boris Becker		1–6, 7–6^{(7–2)}, 6–4	4–6, 6–3, 6–3	7–5, 6–4	3–0	6–2	43–37	1
3	(Czechoslovakia) Ivan Lendl	6–1, 6–7^{(2–7)}, 4–6		6–4, 6–1	6–3, 6–3	2–1	5–2	30–25	2
6	(Ecuador) Andrés Gómez	6–4, 3–6, 3–6	4–6, 1–6		5–7, 7–5, 4–6	0–3	2–6	33–46	4
7	(Austria) Thomas Muster	5–7, 4–6	3–6, 3–6	7–5, 5–7, 6–4		1–2	2–5	33–41	3

Standings are determined by: 1. number of wins; 2. number of matches; 3. in two-players-ties, head-to-head records; 4. in three-players-ties, percentage of sets won, or of games won; 5. steering-committee decision.

== See also ==
- ATP World Tour Finals appearances
