= 1990 ATP Tour World Championships – Doubles =

Doubles
- 1990 ATP Tour World Championships

Final
- Champion: (France) Guy Forget (Switzerland) Jakob Hlasek
- Runner-up: (Spain) Sergio Casal (Spain) Emilio Sánchez
- Score: 6–4, 7–6^{(7–5)}, 5–7, 6–4

Details
- Draw: 8

Events
Singles	Doubles
← 1989 ·	ATP Tour World Championships	· 1991 →

Guy Forget and Jakob Hlasek defeated Sergio Casal and Emilio Sánchez in the final, 6–4, 7–6^{(7–5)}, 5–7, 6–4 to win the doubles tennis title at the 1990 ATP Tour World Championships.

Jim Grabb and Patrick McEnroe were the reigning champions, but did not compete this year.

== Draw ==
Key

- Q = Qualifier
- WC = Wild card
- LL = Lucky loser
- Alt = Alternate
- ITF = ITF entry
- PR = Protected ranking
- SR = Special ranking
- SE = Special exempt
- JE = Junior exempt
- JR = Junior Accelerator Programme entrant
- CO = College Accelerator Programme entrant
- NG = Next Gen Accelerator Program entrant
- w/o = Walkover
- r = Retired
- d = Defaulted

=== Finals ===
Semifinals
(France) Guy Forget (Switzerland) Jakob Hlasek	3	4	6	7	6
(United States) Scott Davis (United States) David Pate	6	6	4	6	4
(Canada) Grant Connell (Canada) Glenn Michibata	4	7	4	7	3
(Spain) Sergio Casal (Spain) Emilio Sánchez	6	6	6	6	6

Final
(France) Guy Forget (Switzerland) Jakob Hlasek	6	7	5	6
(Spain) Sergio Casal (Spain) Emilio Sánchez	4	6^{5}	7	4

=== Group A ===
	(France) Forget (Switzerland) Hlasek	(South Africa) Aldrich (South Africa) Visser	(Australia) Cahill (Australia) Kratzmann	(Canada) Connell (Canada) Michibata	RR; W?L	Set; W?L	Game; W?L	Standings
(France) Guy Forget (Switzerland) Jakob Hlasek		6–3, 7–5	6–2, 7–6	7–6, 6–3	3–0	6–0	39–25	1
(South Africa) Pieter Aldrich (South Africa) Danie Visser	3–6, 5–7		6–2, 6–4	2–6, 6–7	1–2	2–4	28–32	3
(Australia) Darren Cahill (Australia) Mark Kratzmann	2–6, 6–7	2–6, 4–6		4–6, 7–5, 4–6	0–3	1–6	29–42	4
(Canada) Grant Connell (Canada) Glenn Michibata	6–7, 3–6	6–2, 7–6	6–4, 5–7, 6–4		2–1	4–3	39–32	2

Standings are determined by: 1. number of wins; 2. number of matches; 3. in two-players-ties, head-to-head records; 4. in three-players-ties, percentage of sets won, or of games won; 5. steering-committee decision.

=== Group B ===
	(Spain) Casal (Spain) Sánchez	(United Kingdom) Broad (South Africa) Muller	(United States) Davis (United States) Pate	(United States) Leach (United States) Pugh	RR; W?L	Set; W?L	Game; W?L	Standings
(Spain) Sergio Casal (Spain) Emilio Sánchez		6–7, 6–3, 7–6	6– 3, 7–6	4–6, 2–6	2–1	4–3	38–37	1
(United Kingdom) Neil Broad (South Africa) Gary Muller	7–6, 3–6, 6–7		2–6, 2–6	6–7, 6–4, 7–6	1–2	3–5	39–48	4
(United States) Scott Davis (United States) David Pate	3–6, 6–7	6–2, 6–2		7–6, 3–6, 6–4	2–1	4–3	37–33	2
(United States) Rick Leach (United States) Jim Pugh	6–4, 6–2	7–6, 4–6, 6–7	6–7, 6–3, 4–6		1–2	4–4	45–41	4

Standings are determined by: 1. number of wins; 2. number of matches; 3. in two-players-ties, head-to-head records; 4. in three-players-ties, percentage of sets won, or of games won; 5. steering-committee decision.
