= 1988 Bologna Open =

- Date: 6–12 June
- Edition: 4th
- Category: Grand Prix
- Draw: 32S / 16D
- Prize money: $93,400
- Surface: Clay / outdoor
- Location: Bologna, Italy

Champions

Singles
- (Argentina) Alberto Mancini

Doubles
- (Spain) Emilio Sánchez / (Spain) Javier Sánchez
- Bologna Outdoor

The 1988 Bologna Open, also known as the Internazionali di Tennis '88, was a men's tennis tournament played on outdoor clay courts in Bologna, Italy that was part of the 1988 Nabisco Grand Prix circuit. It was the fourth edition of the tournament and was played from 6 June until 12 June 1988. Fifth-seeded Alberto Mancini won the singles title.

== Finals ==
=== Singles ===
(Argentina) Alberto Mancini defeated (Spain) Emilio Sánchez 7–5, 7–6^{(7–4)}

- It was Mancini's first singles title of his career.

=== Doubles ===
(Spain) Emilio Sánchez / (Spain) Javier Sánchez defeated (Switzerland) Rolf Hertzog / (Switzerland) Marc Walder 6–1, 7–6
