= 1991 Campionati Internazionali di Sicilia – Doubles =

Doubles
- 1991 Campionati Internazionali di Sicilia

Final
- Champions: (Netherlands) Jacco Eltingh (Netherlands) Tom Kempers
- Runners-up: (Spain) Emilio Sánchez (Spain) Javier Sánchez
- Score: 3–6, 6–3, 6–3

Details
- Draw: 16 (1WC/1Q)
- Seeds: 4

Events
Singles	Doubles
- Campionati Internazionali di Sicilia

Sergio Casal and Emilio Sánchez were the defending champions, but Casal did not compete this year.

Sánchez teamed up with his brother Javier and the pair lost in the final to Jacco Eltingh and Tom Kempers. The score was 3–6, 6–3, 6–3.

== Seeds ==
1. (Spain) Emilio Sánchez / (Spain) Javier Sánchez (final)
2. (Spain) Carlos Costa / (Spain) Marcos Górriz (first round)
3. (Czechoslovakia) Vojtěch Flégl / (Socialist Federal Republic of Yugoslavia) Goran Prpić (first round)
4. (Argentina) Christian Miniussi / (Uruguay) Diego Pérez (semifinals)

== Draw ==
Key

- Q = Qualifier
- WC = Wild card
- LL = Lucky loser
- Alt = Alternate
- ITF = ITF entry
- PR = Protected ranking
- SR = Special ranking
- SE = Special exempt
- JE = Junior exempt
- JR = Junior Accelerator Programme entrant
- CO = College Accelerator Programme entrant
- NG = Next Gen Accelerator Program entrant
- w/o = Walkover
- r = Retired
- d = Defaulted

=== Draw ===
First round
1	(Spain) E Sánchez (Spain) J Sánchez	6	6
(South Africa) C Banducci (Germany) M Naewie	1	3
Q	(Germany) T Theine (Netherlands) J Winnink	6	2	5
(Spain) J Clavet (Denmark) M Mortensen	4	6	7
3	(Czechoslovakia) V Flégl (Socialist Federal Republic of Yugoslavia) G Prpić	2	6	2
(Spain) J Arrese (Spain) F Roig	6	4	6
(Spain) V Solves (Sweden) T Svantesson	6	7
(South Africa) B Haygarth (Mexico) G Martínez	4	6
(Spain) JC Báguena (Sweden) O Jonsson	6	2
(Netherlands) M Oosting (Finland) O Ranhasto	7	6
(Italy) M Boscatto (Italy) M Cierro	4	4
4	(Argentina) C Miniussi (Uruguay) D Pérez	6	6
WC	(Italy) A Gaudenzi (Austria) T Muster	7	6
(Italy) D Nargiso (Italy) S Pescosolido	6	0
(Netherlands) J Eltingh (Netherlands) T Kempers	7	6	6
2	(Spain) C Costa (Spain) M Górriz	7	1	1

Quarterfinals
1	(Spain) E Sánchez (Spain) J Sánchez	6	6
(Spain) J Clavet (Denmark) M Mortensen	4	3
(Spain) J Arrese (Spain) F Roig	7	2	5
(Spain) V Solves (Sweden) T Svantesson	5	6	7
(Netherlands) M Oosting (Finland) O Ranhasto	2	6
4	(Argentina) C Miniussi (Uruguay) D Pérez	6	7
WC	(Italy) A Gaudenzi (Austria) T Muster	3	4
(Netherlands) J Eltingh (Netherlands) T Kempers	6	6

Semifinals
1	(Spain) E Sánchez (Spain) J Sánchez	6	4	6
(Spain) V Solves (Sweden) T Svantesson	4	6	3
4	(Argentina) C Miniussi (Uruguay) D Pérez	2	6
(Netherlands) J Eltingh (Netherlands) T Kempers	6	7

Final
1	(Spain) E Sánchez (Spain) J Sánchez	6	3	3
(Netherlands) J Eltingh (Netherlands) T Kempers	3	6	6
