= Marc Walder =

Swiss journalist and former tennis player

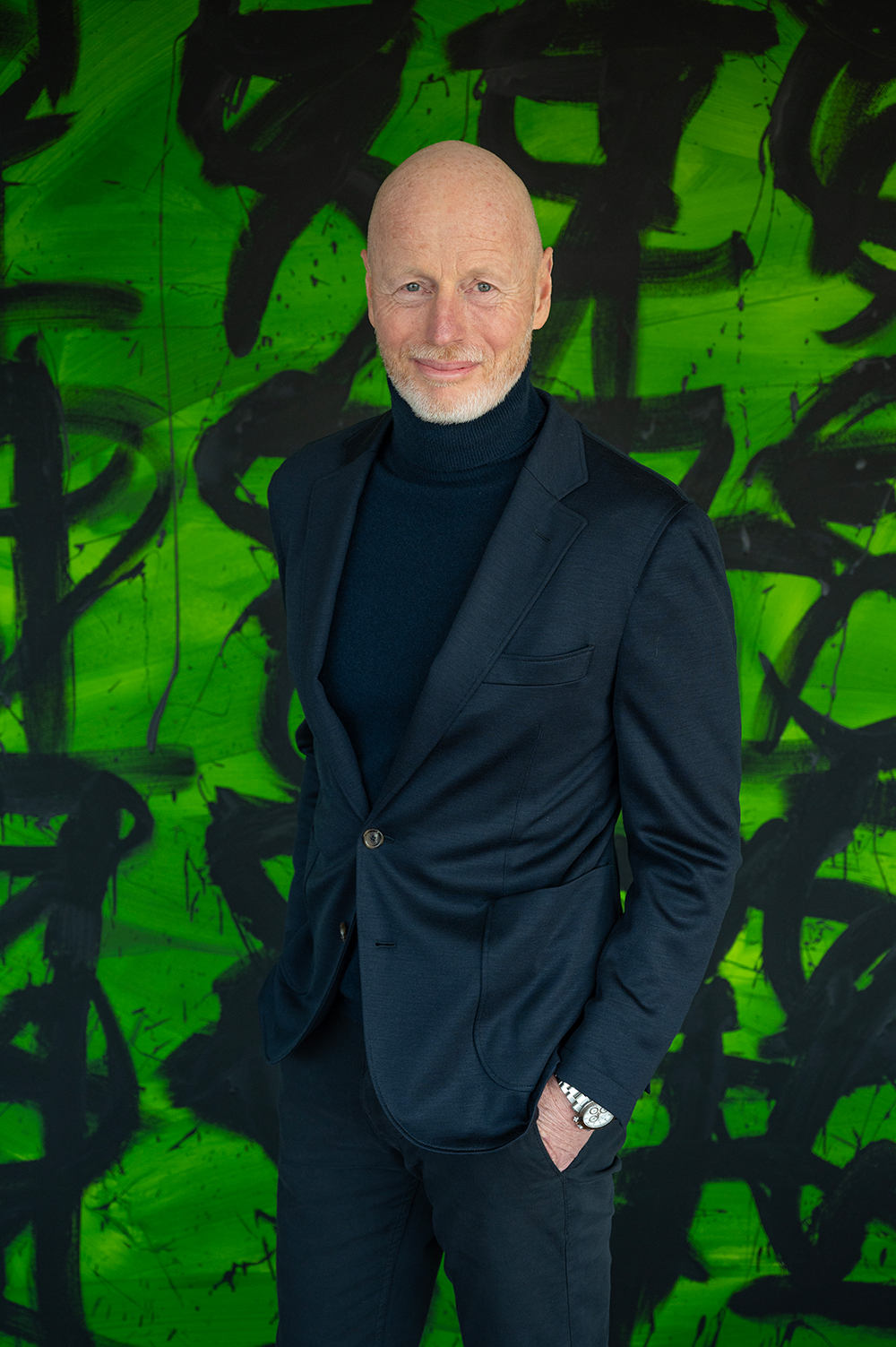
Marc Walder (2025)

Marc Walder (born 19 August 1965) is a Swiss journalist, media executive and former professional tennis player. He is CEO, chairman and managing partner of Ringier.

== Life ==
Walder was a professional tennis player on the ATP Tour from 1984 to 1991. His best ranking in Switzerland was 7, while his top results in the ATP world rankings were 170 (doubles) and 575 (singles), respectively. In 1989, he was double Swiss tennis champion at indoor and outdoor doubles. In 2008 he completed the Advanced Executive Management Program at Harvard Business School in Boston.

Walder lives near Zurich, Switzerland, with his wife and two daughters.

== Ringier AG ==
Following eight years as a tennis pro, Walder embarked on a career at Ringier AG, a Swiss media enterprise, in 1991. He trained at the Ringier School of Journalism in 1993-94. Walder was deputy editor-in-chief of the Sunday tabloid SonntagsBlick from 1997 to 1999 and headed the sports desk at the daily tabloid Blick and SonntagsBlick from 1999 to 2000. During the years 2000 to 2006, Walder was editor-in-chief of Schweizer Illustrierte. He went on to become editor-in-chief of SonntagsBlick while simultaneously heading the Ringier AG newspaper division. On 1 September 2008 Marc Walder took over as CEO of Ringier Switzerland on the Group Executive Board. As a media executive, Walder is committed to a strategy of diversification. Under his guidance Ringier has supplemented its core business (newspapers, magazines, printing plants) by investing in entertainment (events, ticketing, radio, television) and transaction-based Internet business (online marketplaces, e-commerce). On 5 April 2012 Walder was appointed CEO of Ringier AG and became Chairman of the Group Executive Board. Until March 2013 he additionally was CEO Ringier Publishing. In 2016, he was jointly responsible for setting up the joint venture Ringier Axel Springer Schweiz AG and Admeira, a joint marketing organization of Ringier and Swisscom. On 30 January 2018, at the Ringier Management Conference, it was announced that Walder had acquired 10 percent of the shares of the company, thus becoming a Managing Partner.

== Digital Switzerland ==
Walder initiated the «Digital Zurich 2025» project in 2013. Together with representatives of the city, the canton and business leaders, Zurich is to become the digital capital of Europe. In 2016, the initiative was extended to the whole of Switzerland in order to make greater use of the local advantage. At the same time, «Digital Zurich 2025» was renamed into «digitalswitzerland». In 2017, Walder initiated the first Swiss Digital Day, which took place on November 21. On 25 October 2018 the second edition of the Swiss Digital Day took place under the motto «experience digital together». The third Digital Day took place on 3 September 2019 under the motto "Dialogue and the Discussion of Digitization". This time, the nationwide action day was dedicated to the topic of "lifelong learning". With this initiative Walder wants to encourage the Swiss population to lifelong learning. One day before the third Digital Day, on 2 September 2019, the first Swiss Global Digital Summit took place. Walder and Federal President Ueli Maurer invited leading representatives from business and science to Geneva. The aim of this meeting was the launch of the Swiss Digital Initiative (SDI), which in the coming years should contribute to a fair approach in the digital world as well. Walder is President of the Steering Committee and a member of the executive committee at digitalswitzerland. At the Digital Economy Award Night 2019, Walder was awarded the «Digital Economy Ambassador» prize. He was honored for his commitment to the Swiss economy and the ICT industry. The fourth edition of the Swiss Digital Days took place from 1 to 3 November 2020. For the first time, the event was spread over several days due to its importance and size. This year, Walder again announced major news regarding the "digitalswitzerland" location initiative. His aim is to extend the initiative to Europe. The following representatives were invited and joined the European alliance: Besides Marc Walder and Ivo Furrer - President of digitalswitzerland, these are Marcus Wallenberg - Chairman of the SEB and co-founder of the Swedish Digitaltag Initiative Digital@Idag, Susanne Ackum - President Future Work Forum Sweden, Nebojša Đurđević - CEO Digital Serbia Initiative, Dipl.-Vw. Klemens Himpele - CIO of the City of Vienna; Aleksander Kutela - President of the Board of Directors of the Digital Poland Foundation, Constantine Vasuk - Director of the IT Ukraine Association and Patrick Stahl - Co-Managing Director digital-liechtenstein.li.

== Board memberships ==
Marc Walder is a board member of several subsidiary companies within the diversified Ringier media enterprise. He is Chairman of the Board at Admeira AG, which belongs to the two main shareholders Ringier and Swisscom, Ringier Sports AG, Ringier Africa AG, the daily newspaper Le Temps SA and the online classifieds platform Scout24 Schweiz AG. Walder is the Deputy Chairman at the Ticketcorner AG and at the Ringier Axel Springer Schweiz AG, the joint venture between Ringier and German media enterprise Axel Springer SE and as a member of the board of directors for the Ringier Axel Springer Media AG. He is a member of the Board of JobCloud AG, Marquard Media AG, Sportradar Holding AG, the Executive Advisory Board of WORLD.MINDS as well as a trustee of the Laureus Foundation Switzerland. In May 2012, Walder joined the directorate of the Schweizerische Management Gesellschaft (Swiss Management). In June 2017 Walder was at the constituent meeting of the Advisory Council on Digital Transformation of the Swiss Federal Council, of which he is still a member today.
