= Corrado Aprili =

Italian tennis player

- Full name: Corrado Aprili
- Country (sports): Italy
- Born: 13 November 1964 (age 61) Verona, Italy
- Height: 6 ft 3 in (191 cm)
- Plays: Right-handed
- Prize money: $41,323

Singles
- Career record: 4–16
- Highest ranking: No. 108 (6 October 1986)

Doubles
- Career record: 6–14
- Highest ranking: No. 204 (11 December 1989)

Corrado Aprili (born 13 November 1964) is a former professional tennis player from Italy.

== Biography ==
Aprili, a right-handed player from Verona, played on the professional circuit in the 1980s. He made the quarter-finals of a Grand Prix event in Palermo in 1986, with wins over Henrik Sundström and Richard Matuszewski, to reach his career best ranking of 108. In 1987 he defeated the top seeded Andrés Gómez at a tournament in Florence. He retired from professional tennis in 1990.

Now a tennis coach, Aprili runs a tennis school in Castel d'Azzano, a town in Verona.
