= Emilio Sánchez =

Spanish tennis player (born 1965)

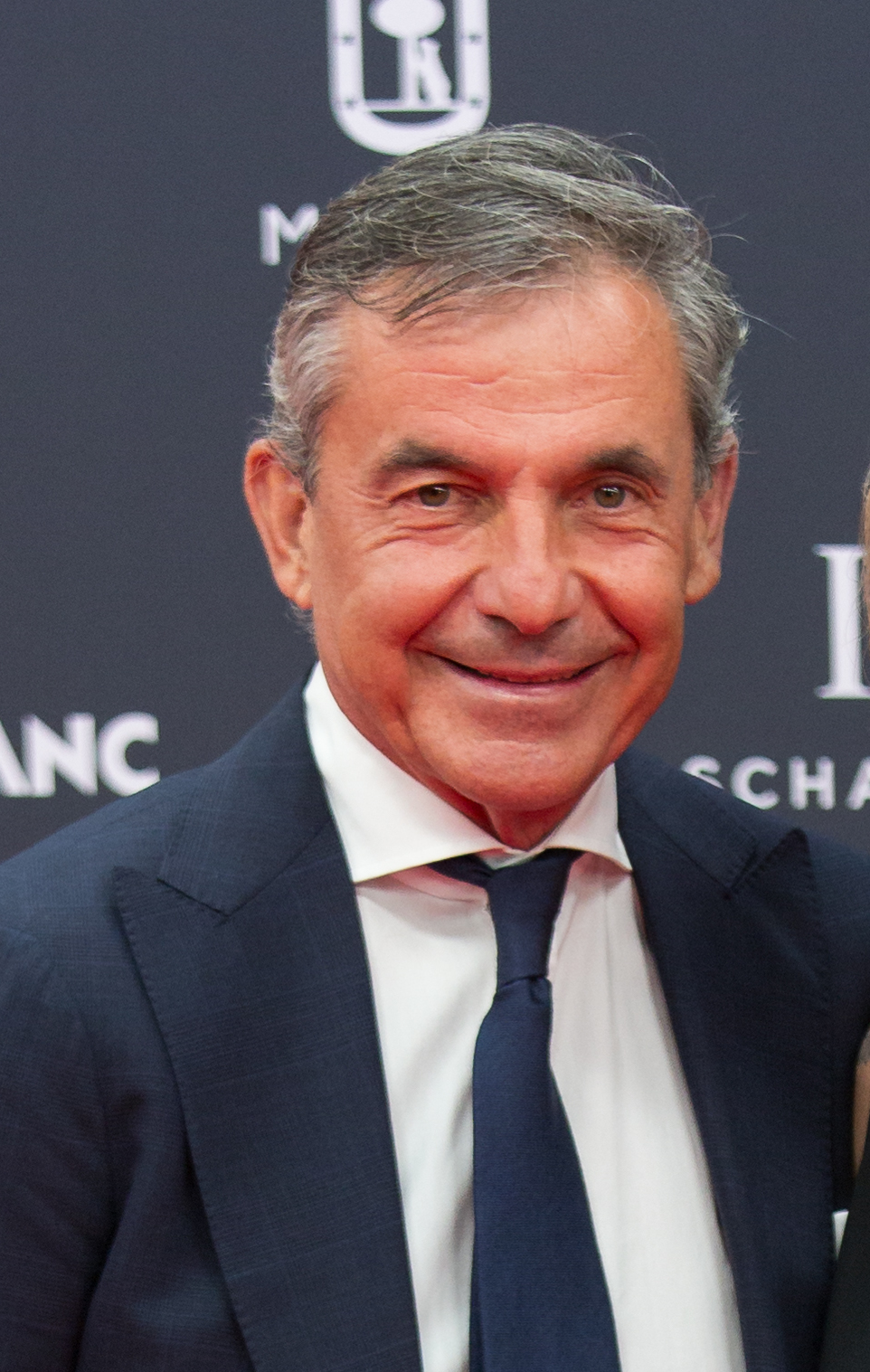
- Emilio Sánchez in 2024
- Country (sports): Spain
- Residence: Monte Carlo, Monaco
- Born: 29 May 1965 (age 61) Madrid, Spain
- Height: 1.80 m (5 ft 11 in)
- Turned pro: 1984
- Retired: 1998
- Plays: Right-handed (one-handed backhand)
- Prize money: $5,332,145

Singles
- Career record: 431–291 (59.7%)
- Career titles: 15
- Highest ranking: No. 7 (30 April 1990)

Grand Slam singles results
- Australian Open: 4R (1992)
- French Open: QF (1988)
- Wimbledon: 4R (1987)
- US Open: QF (1988)

Other tournaments
- Tour Finals: RR (1990)
- Grand Slam Cup: 1R (1992)
- Olympic Games: QF (1992)

Doubles
- Career record: 532–273
- Career titles: 50
- Highest ranking: No. 1 (3 April 1989)

Grand Slam doubles results
- Australian Open: 2R (1990, 1992, 1993, 1994, 1996)
- French Open: W (1988, 1990)
- Wimbledon: F (1987)
- US Open: W (1988)

Other doubles tournaments
- Tour Finals: F (1988, 1990)
- Olympic Games: Silver Medal (1988)

Mixed doubles
- Career titles: 2

Grand Slam mixed doubles results
- French Open: W (1987)
- Wimbledon: SF (1986)
- US Open: W (1987)

Team competitions
- Davis Cup: SF (1987)
- Hopman Cup: W (1990)
Medal record
Representing ESP
Olympic Games
Silver medal – second place	1988 Seoul	Doubles

Emilio Ángel Sánchez Vicario (Spanish pronunciation: [eˈmiljo ˈaŋxel ˈsantʃeθ βiˈkaɾjo]; born 29 May 1965) is a Spanish former doubles world No. 1 tennis player. He won five Grand Slam doubles titles and the men's doubles silver medal at the 1988 Olympic Games. Sánchez is the elder brother of multiple Grand Slam winner Arantxa Sánchez Vicario, with whom he partnered to win the Hopman Cup in 1990. After retiring, he captained Spain to Davis Cup victory in 2008.

== Career ==
Sánchez turned professional in 1984 and won his first top-level singles title in Nice, France in 1986. He won 15 singles titles during his career, including the Italian Open in 1991. During his singles career, he achieved wins over top 5 players including Ivan Lendl, Stefan Edberg, Boris Becker and Mats Wilander. Sánchez's career-high singles ranking was world No. 7.

In doubles, Sánchez captured 50 doubles titles (44 of which partnering Sergio Casal) including three at Grand Slam events. In 1988, he won the doubles titles at both the French Open (with Andrés Gómez) and the US Open (with Casal). He won the French Open title again (with Casal) in 1990. Sánchez and Casal were also the doubles runners-up at Wimbledon in 1987, and the pair won the silver medal for Spain at the 1988 Olympic Games in Seoul. Sánchez was ranked world No. 1 in men's doubles in 1989.

He won two Grand Slam mixed-doubles titles in 1987, at the French Open (with Pam Shriver) and at the US Open (with Martina Navratilova).

Sánchez often played for Spain in international team events. He was a member of Spain's Davis Cup team from the mid-1980s to the mid-1990s, compiling a 32–23 record. Sanchez was also part of the Spanish teams that won the Hopman Cup in 1990 and the World Team Cup in 1992.

Sánchez is the brother of Javier Sánchez Vicario. In 1987, Emilio and Javier met in the final at Madrid, with Emilio winning the match 6–3, 3–6, 6–2. Emilio and Javier faced each other 12 times during their professional careers, with Emilio winning 10 of their matches. In their two grand slam encounters, Emilio defeated Javier in the first round of the 1988 Wimbledon Championships in straight sets, and the third round of the 1992 US Open in five sets. They also frequently played together in doubles.

Emilio Sánchez retired from the professional tour in 1998.

== Post-retirement ==
In 1998, alongside his former doubles partner Casal, Sánchez set up the Sánchez-Casal Tennis Academy in Barcelona. Former students have included Andy Murray, Grigor Dimitrov, Daniela Hantuchova and Svetlana Kuznetsova.

Sánchez was the captain of the Spanish Davis Cup team for three years; his tenure there culminated in Spain's 2008 Davis Cup victory. He resigned as captain after the win.

In 2009, he signed a contract with the Brazilian tennis confederation to coordinate the sport in Brazil.

Sánchez was tournament director for two wheelchair tennis events in 2012.

In 2017, Sánchez was awarded by the ITF its highest accolade, the Philippe Chatrier Award, for his contributions to tennis.

== Personal life ==
Sánchez was born in Madrid to Emilio Sánchez Benito and Marisa Vicario Rubio. His mother, Marisa, introduced Emilio, his brother and his two sisters to tennis.

As well as siblings Arantxa Sánchez and Javier, he also has an older sister – Marisa Sánchez Vicario – who briefly played professional tennis, peaking at world No. 368 in 1990.

In 1999, Sánchez married his Italian-born wife Simona, with whom he has four children.

== Grand Slam record ==
French Open

- Singles quarterfinalist: 1988
- Doubles champion: 1988 (partnering Andrés Gómez), 1990 (partnering Sergio Casal)
- Mixed doubles champion: 1987 (partnering Pam Shriver)

US Open

- Singles quarterfinalist: 1988
- Doubles champion: 1988 (partnering Casal)
- Mixed doubles champion: 1987 (partnering Martina Navratilova)

Wimbledon

- Doubles finalist: 1987
- Mixed doubles semifinalist: 1986

== Career finals ==
=== Singles:27 (15 wins – 12 losses) ===
Result	W-L	Date	Tournament	Surface	Opponent	Score
Win	1–0	Apr 1986	Nice, France	Clay	(Australia) Paul McNamee	6–1, 6–3
Win	2–0	May 1986	Munich, Germany	Clay	(West Germany) Ricki Osterthun	6–1, 6–3
Loss	1–2	May 1986	Rome, Italy	Clay	(Czechoslovakia) Ivan Lendl	5–7, 6–4, 1–6, 1–6
Win	3–1	Jul 1986	Båstad, Sweden	Clay	(Sweden) Mats Wilander	7–6^{(7–5)}, 4–6, 6–4
Loss	3–2	Apr 1987	Nice, France	Clay	(Sweden) Kent Carlsson	6–7^{(7–9)}, 3–6
Loss	3–3	Jun 1987	Bologna, Italy	Clay	(Sweden) Kent Carlsson	2–6, 1–6
Win	4–3	Jul 1987	Gstaad, Switzerland	Clay	(Haiti) Ronald Agénor	6–2, 6–3, 7–6^{(7–5)}
Win	5–3	Jul 1987	Bordeaux, France	Clay	(Haiti) Ronald Agénor	5–7, 6–4, 6–4
Win	6–3	Aug 1987	Kitzbühel, Austria	Clay	(Czechoslovakia) Miloslav Mečíř	6–4, 6–1, 4–6, 6–1
Win	7–3	Sep 1987	Madrid, Spain	Clay	(Spain) Javier Sánchez	6–3, 3–6, 6–2
Loss	7–4	Mar 1988	Indian Wells, U.S.	Hard	(West Germany) Boris Becker	5–7, 4–6, 6–2, 4–6
Loss	7–5	Jun 1988	Bologna, Italy	Clay	(Argentina) Alberto Mancini	5–7, 6–7^{(4–7)}
Win	8–5	Aug 1988	Hilversum, Netherlands	Clay	(Argentina) Guillermo Pérez Roldán	6–3, 6–1, 3–6, 6–3
Loss	8–6	Aug 1988	Kitzbühel, Austria	Clay	(Sweden) Kent Carlsson	1–6, 1–6, 6–4, 6–4, 3–6
Loss	8–7	Jul 1989	Hilversum, Netherlands	Clay	(Czechoslovakia) Karel Nováček	2–6, 4–6
Win	9–7	Aug 1989	Kitzbühel, Austria	Clay	(Argentina) Martín Jaite	7–6^{(7–1)}, 6–1, 2–6, 6–2
Loss	9–8	Oct 1989	Bordeaux, France	Clay	(Czechoslovakia) Ivan Lendl	2–6, 2–6
Win	10–8	Jan 1990	Wellington, New Zealand	Hard	(United States) Richey Reneberg	6–7^{(3–7)}, 6–4, 4–6, 6–4, 6–1
Win	11–8	Apr 1990	Estoril, Portugal	Clay	(Argentina) Franco Davín	6–3, 6–1
Win	12–8	Apr 1991	Barcelona, Spain	Clay	(Spain) Sergi Bruguera	6–4, 7–6^{(9–7)}, 6–2
Win	13–8	May 1991	Rome, Italy	Clay	(Argentina) Alberto Mancini	6–3, 6–1, 3–0 ret.
Loss	13–9	May 1991	Schenectady, United States	Hard	(Germany) Michael Stich	2–6, 4–6
Win	14–9	Jul 1991	Gstaad, Switzerland	Clay	(Spain) Sergi Bruguera	6–1, 6–4, 6–4
Loss	14–10	Sep 1991	Palermo, Italy	Clay	(France) Frédéric Fontang	6–1, 3–6, 3–6
Win	15–10	Jan 1992	Sydney Outdoor, Australia	Hard	(France) Guy Forget	6–3, 6–4
Loss	15–11	Oct 1992	Palermo, Italy	Clay	(Spain) Sergi Bruguera	1–6, 3–6
Loss	15–12	Nov 1993	Santiago, Chile	Clay	(Argentina) Javier Frana	5–7, 6–3, 3–6

=== Doubles: 79 (50 wins – 29 losses) ===
Legend Grand Slam tournaments (3) Tennis Masters Cup (0) ATP Masters Series (3) ATP Championship Series (3) ATP Tour (41)	Finals by surface Hard (7–8) Clay (40–17) Grass (0–1) Carpet (3–3)

Result	W-L	Date	Tournament	Surface	Partner	Opponents	Score
Loss	0–1	Apr 1985	Munich, Germany	Clay	(Spain) Sergio Casal	(Australia) Mark Edmondson (Australia) Kim Warwick	6–4, 5–7, 5–7
Loss	0–2	Jul 1985	Båstad, Sweden	Clay	(Spain) Sergio Casal	(Sweden) Stefan Edberg (Sweden) Anders Järryd	0–6, 6–7^{(2–7)}
Win	1–2	Aug 1985	Kitzbühel, Austria	Clay	(Spain) Sergio Casal	(Italy) Paolo Canè (Italy) Claudio Panatta	6–3, 3–6, 6–2
Loss	1–3	Sep 1985	Palermo, Italy	Clay	(Spain) Sergio Casal	(United Kingdom) Colin Dowdeswell (Sweden) Joakim Nyström	4–6, 7–6, 6–7
Win	2–3	Sep 1985	Geneva, Switzerland	Clay	(Spain) Sergio Casal	(Brazil) Carlos Kirmayr (Brazil) Cássio Motta	6–4, 4–6, 7–5
Win	3–3	Sep 1985	Barcelona, Spain	Clay	(Spain) Sergio Casal	(Sweden) Jan Gunnarsson (Denmark) Michael Mortensen	6–3, 6–3
Loss	3–4	Nov 1985	Vienna, Austria	Hard (i)	(Spain) Sergio Casal	(United States) Mike De Palmer (United States) Gary Donnelly	4–6, 3–6
Loss	3–5	Apr 1986	Bari, Italy	Clay	(Spain) Sergio Casal	(United States) Gary Donnelly (Czechoslovakia) Tomáš Šmíd	6–2, 4–6, 4–6
Win	4–5	May 1986	Munich, Germany	Clay	(Spain) Sergio Casal	(Australia) Broderick Dyke (Australia) Wally Masur	6–3, 4–6, 6–3
Win	5–5	May 1986	Florence, Italy	Clay	(Spain) Sergio Casal	(United States) Mike De Palmer (United States) Gary Donnelly	6–4, 7–6
Win	6–5	Jul 1986	Gstaad, Switzerland	Clay	(Spain) Sergio Casal	(Sweden) Stefan Edberg (Sweden) Joakim Nyström	6–3, 3–6, 6–3
Win	7–5	Jul 1986	Båstad, Sweden	Clay	(Spain) Sergio Casal	(South Africa) Craig Campbell (United States) Joey Rive	6–4, 6–2
Win	8–5	Sep 1986	Hamburg, Germany	Clay	(Spain) Sergio Casal	(West Germany) Boris Becker (West Germany) Eric Jelen	6–4, 6–1
Win	9–5	Feb 1987	Philadelphia, U.S.	Carpet (i)	(Spain) Sergio Casal	(South Africa) Christo Steyn (South Africa) Danie Visser	3–6, 6–1, 7–6
Loss	9–6	Feb 1987	Memphis, U.S.	Hard (i)	(Spain) Sergio Casal	(Sweden) Anders Järryd (Sweden) Jonas Svensson	4–6, 2–6
Loss	9–7	Apr 1987	Milan, Italy	Carpet (i)	(Spain) Sergio Casal	(West Germany) Boris Becker (Socialist Federal Republic of Yugoslavia) Slobodan Živojinović	6–3, 3–6, 4–6
Win	10–7	Apr 1987	Nice, France	Clay	(Spain) Sergio Casal	(Switzerland) Claudio Mezzadri (Italy) Gianni Ocleppo	6–3, 6–3
Loss	10–8	May 1987	Munich, Germany	Clay	(Spain) Sergio Casal	(United States) Jim Pugh (United States) Blaine Willenborg	6–7, 6–4, 4–6
Win	11–8	Jun 1987	Bologna, Italy	Clay	(Spain) Sergio Casal	(Italy) Claudio Panatta (United States) Blaine Willenborg	6–3, 6–2
Loss	11–9	Jul 1987	Wimbledon, London	Grass	(Spain) Sergio Casal	(United States) Ken Flach (United States) Robert Seguso	6–3, 7–6, 6–7, 1–6, 4–6
Win	12–9	Jul 1987	Bordeaux, France	Clay	(Spain) Sergio Casal	(Australia) Darren Cahill (Australia) Mark Woodforde	6–3, 6–3
Loss	12–10	Aug 1987	Båstad, Sweden	Clay	(Spain) Javier Sánchez	(Sweden) Stefan Edberg (Sweden) Anders Järryd	6–7, 3–6
Win	13–10	Aug 1987	Kitzbühel, Austria	Clay	(Spain) Sergio Casal	(Czechoslovakia) Miloslav Mečíř (Czechoslovakia) Tomáš Šmíd	7–6, 7–6
Loss	13–11	Sep 1987	Madrid, Spain	Clay	(Spain) Sergio Casal	(Peru) Carlos di Laura (Spain) Javier Sánchez	3–6, 6–3, 4–6
Loss	13–12	Oct 1987	Vienna, Austria	Hard (i)	(Spain) Javier Sánchez	(United States) Mel Purcell (United States) Tim Wilkison	3–6, 5–7
Win	14–12	Nov 1987	Itaparica, Brazil	Hard	(Spain) Sergio Casal	(Mexico) Jorge Lozano (Uruguay) Diego Pérez	6–2, 6–2
Win	15–12	Apr 1988	Madrid, Spain	Clay	(Spain) Sergio Casal	(Australia) Jason Stoltenberg (Australia) Todd Woodbridge	6–7, 7–6, 6–4
Win	16–12	April 1988	Monte Carlo, Monaco	Clay	(Spain) Sergio Casal	(France) Henri Leconte (Czechoslovakia) Ivan Lendl	6–1, 6–3
Win	17–12	Jun 1988	French Open, Paris	Clay	(Ecuador) Andrés Gómez	(Australia) John Fitzgerald (Sweden) Anders Järryd	6–3, 6–7, 6–4, 6–3
Win	18–12	Jun 1988	Bologna, Italy	Clay	(Spain) Javier Sánchez	(Switzerland) Rolf Hertzog (Switzerland) Marc Walder	6–1, 7–6
Loss	18–13	Jul 1988	Gstaad, Switzerland	Clay	(Ecuador) Andrés Gómez	(Czechoslovakia) Petr Korda (Czechoslovakia) Milan Šrejber	6–7, 6–7
Win	19–13	Jul 1988	Stuttgart, Germany	Clay	(Spain) Sergio Casal	(Sweden) Anders Järryd (Denmark) Michael Mortensen	4–6, 6–3, 6–4
Win	20–13	Aug 1988	Hilversum, Netherlands	Clay	(Spain) Sergio Casal	(Sweden) Magnus Gustafsson (Argentina) Guillermo Pérez Roldán	7–6, 6–3
Win	21–13	Aug 1988	Kitzbühel, Austria	Clay	(Spain) Sergio Casal	(Sweden) Joakim Nyström (Italy) Claudio Panatta	6–4, 7–5
Win	22–13	Sep 1988	US Open, New York	Hard	(Spain) Sergio Casal	(United States) Rick Leach (United States) Jim Pugh	w/o
Win	23–13	Sep 1988	Barcelona, Spain	Clay	(Spain) Sergio Casal	(Switzerland) Claudio Mezzadri (Uruguay) Diego Pérez	6–4, 6–3
Loss	23–14	Sep 1988	Seoul Olympics, South Korea	Hard	(Spain) Sergio Casal	(United States) Ken Flach (United States) Robert Seguso	3–6, 4–6, 7–6, 7–6, 7–9
Win	24–14	Nov 1988	Itaparica, Brazil	Hard	(Spain) Sergio Casal	(Mexico) Jorge Lozano (United States) Todd Witsken	7–6, 7–6
Loss	24–15	Dec 1988	Masters Doubles, London	Carpet	(Spain) Sergio Casal	(United States) Rick Leach (United States) Jim Pugh	4–6, 3–6, 6–2, 0–6
Win	25–15	May 1989	Hamburg, Germany	Clay	(Spain) Javier Sánchez	(West Germany) Boris Becker (West Germany) Eric Jelen	6–4, 6–1
Win	26–15	Aug 1989	Kitzbühel, Austria	Clay	(Spain) Javier Sánchez	(Czechoslovakia) Petr Korda (Czechoslovakia) Tomáš Šmíd	7–5, 7–6
Loss	26–16	Jan 1990	Wellington, New Zealand	Hard	(Spain) Sergio Casal	(New Zealand) Kelly Evernden (Venezuela) Nicolás Pereira	4–6, 6–7
Win	27–16	Feb 1990	Brussels, Belgium	Carpet (i)	(Socialist Federal Republic of Yugoslavia) Slobodan Živojinović	(Socialist Federal Republic of Yugoslavia) Goran Ivanišević (Hungary) Balázs Taróczy	7–5, 6–3
Win	28–16	Apr 1990	Estoril, Portugal	Clay	(Spain) Sergio Casal	(Italy) Omar Camporese (Italy) Paolo Canè	7–5, 4–6, 7–5
Loss	28–17	Apr 1990	Barcelona, Spain	Clay	(Spain) Sergio Casal	(Ecuador) Andrés Gómez (Spain) Javier Sánchez	6–7, 5–7
Win	29–17	May 1990	Rome, Italy	Clay	(Spain) Sergio Casal	(United States) Jim Courier (United States) Martin Davis	7–6, 7–5
Win	30–17	Jun 1990	French Open, Paris	Clay	(Spain) Sergio Casal	(Socialist Federal Republic of Yugoslavia) Goran Ivanišević (Czechoslovakia) Petr Korda	7–5, 6–3
Win	31–17	Jul 1990	Gstaad, Switzerland	Clay	(Spain) Sergio Casal	(Italy) Omar Camporese (Spain) Javier Sánchez	6–3, 3–6, 7–5
Win	32–17	Jul 1990	Hilversum, Netherlands	Clay	(Spain) Sergio Casal	(Netherlands) Paul Haarhuis (Netherlands) Mark Koevermans	7–5, 7–5
Win	33–17	Oct 1990	Palermo, Italy	Clay	(Spain) Sergio Casal	(Spain) Carlos Costa (Argentina) Horacio de la Peña	6–3, 6–4
Loss	33–18	Nov 1990	Doubles Championships, Sanctuary Cove	Hard	(Spain) Sergio Casal	(France) Guy Forget (Switzerland) Jakob Hlasek	4–6, 6–7, 7–5, 4–6
Win	34–18	Jan 1991	Auckland, New Zealand	Hard	(Spain) Sergio Casal	(Canada) Grant Connell (Canada) Glenn Michibata	4–6, 6–3, 6–4
Win	35–18	Feb 1991	Stuttgart Indoor, Germany	Carpet (i)	(Spain) Sergio Casal	(United Kingdom) Jeremy Bates (United Kingdom) Nick Brown	6–3, 7–5
Win	36–18	May 1991	Hamburg, Germany	Clay	(Spain) Sergio Casal	(Brazil) Cássio Motta (South Africa) Danie Visser	4–6, 6–3, 6–2
Win	37–18	Jul 1991	Stuttgart Outdoor, Germany	Clay	(Australia) Wally Masur	(Italy) Omar Camporese (Croatia) Goran Ivanišević	4–6, 6–3, 6–4
Loss	37–19	Aug 1991	Schenectady, U.S.	Hard	(Ecuador) Andrés Gómez	(Spain) Javier Sánchez (Australia) Todd Woodbridge	6–3, 6–7, 6–7
Loss	37–20	Sep 1991	Palermo, Italy	Clay	(Spain) Javier Sánchez	(Netherlands) Jacco Eltingh (Netherlands) Tom Kempers	6–3, 3–6, 3–6
Win	38–20	Nov 1991	Búzios, Brazil	Hard	(Spain) Sergio Casal	(Argentina) Javier Frana (Mexico) Leonardo Lavalle	4–6, 6–3, 6–4
Win	39–20	Jan 1992	Sydney Outdoor, Australia	Hard	(Spain) Sergio Casal	(United States) Scott Davis (United States) Kelly Jones	3–6, 6–1, 6–4
Loss	39–21	Feb 1992	Milan, Italy	Carpet (i)	(Spain) Sergio Casal	(United Kingdom) Neil Broad (Australia) David Macpherson	7–5, 5–7, 4–6
Win	40–21	May 1992	Hamburg, Germany	Clay	(Spain) Sergio Casal	(Germany) Carl-Uwe Steeb (Germany) Michael Stich	5–7, 6–4, 6–3
Win	41–21	Jul 1992	Kitzbühel, Austria	Clay	(Spain) Sergio Casal	(Argentina) Horacio de la Peña (Czechoslovakia) Vojtěch Flégl	6–1, 6–2
Loss	41–22	Aug 1992	Schenectady, U.S.	Hard	(Spain) Sergio Casal	(Netherlands) Jacco Eltingh (Netherlands) Paul Haarhuis	3–6, 4–6
Win	42–22	Sep 1992	Bordeaux, France	Clay	(Spain) Sergio Casal	(France) Arnaud Boetsch (France) Guy Forget	6–1, 6–4
Loss	42–23	Apr 1993	Barcelona, Spain	Clay	(Spain) Sergio Casal	(United States) Shelby Cannon (United States) Scott Melville	6–7, 1–6
Win	43–23	Jun 1993	Genova, Italy	Clay	(Spain) Sergio Casal	(Netherlands) Mark Koevermans (United States) Greg Van Emburgh	6–3, 7–6
Win	44–23	Oct 1993	Palermo, Italy	Clay	(Spain) Sergio Casal	(Argentina) Juan Garat (Mexico) Jorge Lozano	6–3, 6–3
Win	45–23	Oct 1993	Tel Aviv, Israel	Hard	(Spain) Sergio Casal	(United States) Mike Bauer (Czech Republic) David Rikl	6–4, 6–4
Win	46–23	Nov 1993	São Paulo, Brazil	Clay	(Spain) Sergio Casal	(Argentina) Pablo Albano (Argentina) Javier Frana	4–6, 7–6, 6–4
Loss	46–24	Nov 1993	Buenos Aires, Argentina	Clay	(Spain) Sergio Casal	(Spain) Tomás Carbonell (Spain) Carlos Costa	4–6, 4–6
Win	47–24	Jul 1994	Gstaad, Switzerland	Clay	(Spain) Sergio Casal	(Netherlands) Menno Oosting (Czech Republic) Daniel Vacek	7–6, 6–4
Loss	47–25	Aug 1994	Kitzbühel, Austria	Clay	(Spain) Sergio Casal	(South Africa) David Adams (Russia) Andrei Olhovskiy	7–6, 3–6, 5–7
Loss	47–26	Nov 1994	Montevideo, Uruguay	Clay	(Spain) Sergio Casal	(Uruguay) Marcelo Filippini (Brazil) Luiz Mattar	6–7, 4–6
Win	48–26	Nov 1994	Buenos Aires, Argentina	Clay	(Spain) Sergio Casal	(Spain) Tomás Carbonell (Spain) Francisco Roig	6–3, 6–2
Win	49–26	May 1995	Atlanta, U.S.	Clay	(Spain) Sergio Casal	(United States) Jared Palmer (United States) Richey Reneberg	6–7, 6–3, 7–6
Loss	49–27	May 1995	Coral Springs, U.S.	Clay	(Spain) Sergio Casal	(Australia) Todd Woodbridge (Australia) Mark Woodforde	3–6, 1–6
Win	50–27	Nov 1995	Montevideo, Uruguay	Clay	(Spain) Sergio Casal	(Czech Republic) Jiří Novák (Czech Republic) David Rikl	2–6, 7–6, 7–6
Loss	50–28	Mar 1996	Mexico City, Mexico	Clay	(Venezuela) Nicolás Pereira	(United States) Donald Johnson (United States) Francisco Montana	2–6, 4–6
Loss	50–29	Sep 1996	Palermo, Italy	Clay	(Italy) Cristian Brandi	(Australia) Andrew Kratzmann (South Africa) Marcos Ondruska	6–7, 4–6

== Doubles performance timeline ==
Key
W	F	SF	QF	#R	RR	Q#	DNQ	A	NH

(W) winner; (F) finalist; (SF) semifinalist; (QF) quarterfinalist; (#R) rounds 4, 3, 2, 1; (RR) round-robin stage; (Q#) qualification round; (DNQ) did not qualify; (A) absent; (NH) not held; (SR) strike rate (events won / competed); (W–L) win–loss record.

Tournament	1984	1985	1986	1987	1988	1989	1990	1991	1992	1993	1994	1995	1996	1997	1998	Career SR	Career win–loss
Grand Slam tournaments
Australian Open	A	A	NH	A	A	A	2R	1R	2R	2R	2R	A	2R	A	A	0 / 6	5–6
French Open	1R	1R	QF	2R	W	A	W	3R	1R	QF	QF	2R	A	1R	A	2 / 12	25–10
Wimbledon	A	1R	QF	F	2R	A	A	A	A	A	A	A	A	2R	A	0 / 5	10–5
US Open	A	A	1R	SF	W	2R	2R	3R	QF	1R	2R	SF	A	A	A	1 / 10	21–9
Grand Slam SR	0 / 1	0 / 2	0 / 3	0 / 3	2 / 3	0 / 1	1 / 3	0 / 3	0 / 3	0 / 3	0 / 3	0 / 2	0 / 1	0 / 2	0 / 0	3 / 33	N/A
Annual win–loss	0–1	0–2	6–3	10–3	12–1	1–1	8–2	4–3	4–3	4–3	5–3	5–2	1–1	1–2	0–0	N/A	61–30
Year-end championship
ATP Finals	DNQ	QF	RR	SF	F	DNQ	F	DNQ	SF	RR	RR	Did not qualify				0 / 8	13–15
National representation
Davis Cup	ZG1	PO	PO	SF	PO	QF	PO	QF	PO	1R	A	PO	ZG1	A	A	0 / 10	14–9
Olympic Games	Not held				F-S	Not held			QF	Not held			A	Not held		0 / 2	6–2
ATP Masters Series
Indian Wells	These Tournaments Were Not Masters Series Events Before 1990						1R	2R	2R	2R	1R	1R	1R	A	A	0 / 7	2–7
Key Biscayne	These Tournaments Were Not Masters Series Events Before 1990						QF	QF	2R	3R	2R	2R	2R	1R	A	0 / 8	7–8
Monte Carlo	These Tournaments Were Not Masters Series Events Before 1990						2R	SF	2R	SF	SF	2R	1R	A	A	0 / 7	9–6
Rome	These Tournaments Were Not Masters Series Events Before 1990						W	QF	1R	2R	1R	A	2R	A	A	1 / 6	9–5
Hamburg	These Tournaments Were Not Masters Series Events Before 1990						2R	W	W	SF	2R	A	A	A	A	2 / 5	13–3
Montreal / Toronto	These Tournaments Were Not Masters Series Events Before 1990						A	A	A	A	A	A	A	A	A	0 / 0	0–0
Cincinnati	These Tournaments Were Not Masters Series Events Before 1990						A	1R	A	A	A	A	A	A	A	0 / 1	0–1
Madrid (Stuttgart)	These Tournaments Were Not Masters Series Events Before 1990						2R	A	A	A	A	A	A	A	A	0 / 1	0–1
Paris	These Tournaments Were Not Masters Series Events Before 1990						2R	A	2R	A	A	A	A	A	A	0 / 2	0–2
Masters Series SR	N/A						1 / 7	1 / 6	1 / 6	0 / 5	0 / 5	0 / 3	0 / 4	0 / 1	0 / 0	3 / 37	N/A
Annual win–loss	N/A						8–6	10–5	6–5	9–5	4–5	1–3	2–3	0–1	0–0	N/A	40–33
Year-end ranking	115	27	29	8	5	27	9	13	22	24	29	34	75	208	821	N/A	
