= Javier Sánchez (tennis) =

Spanish tennis player (born 1968)

- Country (sports): Spain
- Residence: Andorra la Vella, Andorra
- Born: 1 February 1968 (age 58) Pamplona, Spain
- Height: 1.77 m (5 ft 9 1/2 in)
- Turned pro: 1986
- Retired: 2000
- Plays: Right-handed (one-handed backhand)
- Prize money: $4,427,811

Singles
- Career record: 327–335
- Career titles: 4
- Highest ranking: No. 23 (6 June 1994)

Grand Slam singles results
- Australian Open: 3R (1990)
- French Open: 4R (1990)
- Wimbledon: 2R (1991, 1992, 1997)
- US Open: QF (1991, 1996)

Doubles
- Career record: 379–311
- Career titles: 26
- Highest ranking: No. 9 (30 April 1990)

Grand Slam doubles results
- Australian Open: QF (1993, 1998)
- French Open: QF (1989)
- Wimbledon: 1R (1988, 1991, 1996, 1999)
- US Open: QF (1993, 1996, 1998)

Javier Sánchez Vicario (Spanish pronunciation: [xaˈβjeɾ ˈsantʃeθ]; born 1 February 1968) is a former top-ten doubles professional tennis player from Spain. Sánchez won the US Open junior singles and doubles title in 1986, and reached the quarterfinal stage in the US Open men's singles event twice – in 1991 and 1996.

== Career ==
Sánchez won the US Open junior singles and doubles title in 1986, partnering with Tomás Carbonell, and became world no. 1 junior that same year.

In Javier's first career singles final in 1987 in Madrid, he faced his brother Emilio Sánchez. Emilio won the match in three sets. Emilio and Javier would play each other a total of 12 times during their careers, Emilio winning ten of their encounters and Javier winning two. They also partnered together to win three doubles titles.

Sanchez won his first professional doubles titles in 1987 and his first singles title in 1988 in Buenos Aires. His best grand slam performances included reaching the quarterfinals of the US Open in 1991 (defeating world no. 5 Sergi Bruguera) and 1996. Sanchez also reached the semifinals of the 1994 Hamburg Masters. He won a career total of four singles titles and 26 doubles titles, and reached a career-high ranking of no. 23 in singles (in 1994) and no. 9 in doubles (in 1992).

== Personal life ==
Sánchez is a member of one of the world's most successful tennis families. His younger sister Arantxa Sánchez Vicario achieved the world no. 1 ranking in both singles and doubles, and won four Grand Slam singles titles; and his older brother Emilio Sánchez reached world no. 1 in doubles and won five Grand Slam doubles titles. They also have an older sister – Marisa – who also played professional tennis, peaking at world no. 368 in 1990.

Sánchez and wife Isabel wed in September 1994. They have two daughters, Alba (born July 1998) and Julia (born March 2000).

In 2012, Arantxa Sánchez Vicario sued Javier Sánchez (and their father) for the alleged mishandling and embezzlement of her $60 million career earnings. The court case continued over three years, and in 2015 concluded in a private settlement.

== Career finals ==
=== Doubles: 44 (26 wins / 18 losses) ===
Legend Grand Slam (0) ATP Masters Series (2) ATP Championship Series (3) ATP Tour (21)	Titles by surface Hard (6) Clay (20) Grass (0) Carpet (0)

Result	W-L	Date	Tournament	Surface	Partner	Opponents	Score
Loss	0–1	Aug 1987	Båstad, Sweden	Clay	(Spain) Emilio Sánchez	(Sweden) Stefan Edberg (Sweden) Anders Järryd	6–7, 3–6
Win	1–1	Sep 1987	Madrid, Spain	Clay	(Peru) Carlos di Laura	(Spain) Sergio Casal (Spain) Emilio Sánchez	6–3, 3–6, 6–4
Loss	1–2	Oct 1987	Vienna, Austria	Carpet (i)	(Spain) Emilio Sánchez	(United States) Mel Purcell (United States) Tim Wilkison	3–6, 5–7
Win	2–2	Nov 1987	São Paulo, Brazil	Hard	(Israel) Gilad Bloom	(Spain) Tomás Carbonell (Spain) Sergio Casal	6–3, 6–7, 6–4
Win	3–2	Jun 1988	Bologna, Italy	Clay	(Spain) Emilio Sánchez	(Switzerland) Rolf Hertzog (Switzerland) Marc Walder	6–1, 7–6
Loss	3–3	Nov 1988	São Paulo, Brazil	Hard	(Chile) Ricardo Acuña	(United States) Jay Berger (Argentina) Horacio de la Peña	7–5, 4–6, 3–6
Win	4–3	Nov 1988	Buenos Aires, Argentina	Clay	(Spain) Carlos Costa	(Argentina) Eduardo Bengoechea (Argentina) José Luis Clerc	6–3, 3–6, 6–3
Win	5–3	May 1989	Munich, West Germany	Clay	(Hungary) Balázs Taróczy	(Australia) Peter Doohan (Australia) Laurie Warder	7–6, 6–7, 7–6
Win	6–3	May 1989	Hamburg, West Germany	Clay	(Spain) Emilio Sánchez	(Germany) Boris Becker (Germany) Eric Jelen	6–4, 6–1
Win	7–3	Jun 1989	Bologna, Italy	Clay	(Spain) Sergio Casal	(Sweden) Tomas Nydahl (Sweden) Jörgen Windahl	6–2, 6–3
Loss	7–4	Jun 1989	Bari, Italy	Clay	(Spain) Sergio Casal	(Italy) Simone Colombo (Switzerland) Claudio Mezzadri	6–0, 3–6, 3–6
Win	8–4	Aug 1989	Kitzbühel, Austria	Clay	(Spain) Emilio Sánchez	(Czech Republic) Petr Korda (Czech Republic) Tomáš Šmíd	7–5, 7–6
Win	9–4	Apr 1990	Barcelona, Spain	Clay	(Ecuador) Andrés Gómez	(Spain) Sergio Casal (Spain) Emilio Sánchez	7–6, 7–5
Loss	9–5	Apr 1990	Monte Carlo, Monaco	Clay	(Ecuador) Andrés Gómez	(Czech Republic) Tomáš Šmíd (Czech Republic) Petr Korda	4–6, 6–7
Loss	9–6	May 1990	Madrid, Spain	Clay	(Ecuador) Andrés Gómez	(Spain) Juan Carlos Baguena (Italy) Omar Camporese	4–6, 6–3, 3–6
Loss	9–7	Jul 1990	Gstaad, Switzerland	Clay	(Italy) Omar Camporese	(Spain) Sergio Casal (Spain) Emilio Sánchez	3–6, 6–3, 5–7
Win	10–7	Aug 1990	Kitzbühel, Austria	Clay	(France) Éric Winogradsky	(Spain) Francisco Clavet (Austria) Horst Skoff	7–6, 6–2
Win	11–7	Oct 1990	Athens, Greece	Clay	(Spain) Sergio Casal	(Netherlands) Tom Kempers (Netherlands) Richard Krajicek	6–4, 6–3
Win	12–7	Mar 1991	Indian Wells, U.S.	Hard	(United States) Jim Courier	(France) Guy Forget (France) Henri Leconte	7–6, 3–6, 6–3
Win	13–7	May 1991	Umag, Croatia	Clay	(Israel) Gilad Bloom	(United States) Richey Reneberg (United States) David Wheaton	7–6, 2–6, 6–1
Win	14–7	Aug 1991	Schenectady, U.S.	Hard	(Australia) Todd Woodbridge	(Ecuador) Andrés Gómez (Spain) Emilio Sánchez	3–6, 7–6, 7–6
Loss	14–8	Sep 1991	Palermo, Italy	Clay	(Spain) Emilio Sánchez	(Netherlands) Jacco Eltingh (Netherlands) Tom Kempers	6–3, 3–6, 3–6
Win	15–8	Apr 1992	Barcelona, Spain	Clay	(Ecuador) Andrés Gómez	(Czech Republic) Ivan Lendl (Czech Republic) Karel Nováček	6–4, 6–4
Loss	15–9	May 1992	Bologna, Italy	Clay	(Argentina) Javier Frana	(United States) Luke Jensen (Australia) Laurie Warder	2–6, 3–6
Loss	15–10	Oct 1992	Stuttgart Outdoor, Germany	Clay	(Switzerland) Marc Rosset	(United States) Glenn Layendecker (South Africa) Byron Talbot	6–4, 3–6, 4–6
Loss	15–11	Nov 1993	Antwerp, Belgium	Carpet (i)	(South Africa) Wayne Ferreira	(Canada) Grant Connell (United States) Patrick Galbraith	3–6, 6–7
Loss	15–12	Apr 1994	Barcelona, Spain	Clay	(United States) Jim Courier	(Russia) Yevgeny Kafelnikov (Czech Republic) David Rikl	7–5, 1–6, 4–6
Win	16–12	Apr 1994	Nice, France	Clay	(Australia) Mark Woodforde	(Netherlands) Hendrik Jan Davids (South Africa) Piet Norval	7–5, 6–3
Loss	16–13	May 1994	Rome, Italy	Clay	(South Africa) Wayne Ferreira	(Russia) Yevgeny Kafelnikov (Czech Republic) David Rikl	1–6, 5–7
Win	17–13	Oct 1994	Athens, Greece	Clay	(Argentina) Luis Lobo	(Italy) Cristian Brandi (Italy) Federico Mordegan	5–7, 6–1, 6–4
Loss	17–14	Jan 1995	Auckland, New Zealand	Hard	(Argentina) Luis Lobo	(Canada) Grant Connell (United States) Patrick Galbraith	4–6, 3–6
Loss	17–15	Mar 1995	Scottsdale, U.S.	Hard	(Argentina) Luis Lobo	(United States) Trevor Kronemann (Australia) David Macpherson	6–4, 3–6, 4–6
Loss	17–16	May 1995	Monte Carlo, Monaco	Clay	(Argentina) Luis Lobo	(Netherlands) Jacco Eltingh (Netherlands) Paul Haarhuis	3–6, 4–6
Win	18–16	Jul 1995	Gstaad, Switzerland	Clay	(Argentina) Luis Lobo	(France) Arnaud Boetsch (Switzerland) Marc Rosset	6–7, 7–6, 7–6
Win	19–16	Aug 1995	Umag, Croatia	Clay	(Argentina) Luis Lobo	(Sweden) David Ekerot (Hungary) László Markovits	6–4, 6–0
Loss	19–17	Oct 1995	Munich, Germany	Clay	(Argentina) Luis Lobo	(United States) Trevor Kronemann (Australia) David Macpherson	3–6, 4–6
Win	20–17	Apr 1996	Barcelona, Spain	Clay	(Argentina) Luis Lobo	(United Kingdom) Neil Broad (South Africa) Piet Norval	6–1, 6–3
Loss	20–18	May 1996	Prague, Czech Republic	Clay	(Argentina) Luis Lobo	(Russia) Yevgeny Kafelnikov (Czech Republic) Daniel Vacek	3–6, 7–6, 3–6
Win	21–18	Jan 1997	Sydney Outdoor, Australia	Hard	(Argentina) Luis Lobo	(Netherlands) Paul Haarhuis (Netherlands) Jan Siemerink	6–4, 6–7, 6–3
Win	22–18	Mar 1997	Scottsdale, U.S.	Hard	(Argentina) Luis Lobo	(Sweden) Jonas Björkman (United States) Rick Leach	6–3, 6–3
Win	23–18	May 1997	Hamburg, Germany	Clay	(Argentina) Luis Lobo	(United Kingdom) Neil Broad (South Africa) Piet Norval	6–3, 7–6
Win	24–18	Oct 1997	Bucharest, Romania	Clay	(Argentina) Luis Lobo	(Netherlands) Hendrik Jan Davids (Argentina) Daniel Orsanic	7–5, 7–5
Win	25–18	Aug 1998	Long Island, U.S.	Hard	(Spain) Julián Alonso	(United States) Brandon Coupe (United States) Dave Randall	6–4, 6–4
Win	26–18	Aug 1999	Umag, Croatia	Clay	(Argentina) Mariano Puerta	(Italy) Massimo Bertolini (Italy) Cristian Brandi	3–6, 6–2, 6–3

== Doubles performance timeline ==
Key
W	F	SF	QF	#R	RR	Q#	DNQ	A	NH

(W) winner; (F) finalist; (SF) semifinalist; (QF) quarterfinalist; (#R) rounds 4, 3, 2, 1; (RR) round-robin stage; (Q#) qualification round; (DNQ) did not qualify; (A) absent; (NH) not held; (SR) strike rate (events won / competed); (W–L) win–loss record.

Tournament	1985	1986	1987	1988	1989	1990	1991	1992	1993	1994	1995	1996	1997	1998	1999	2000	Career SR	Career W–L
Grand Slam tournaments
Australian Open	A	NH	A	A	A	2R	1R	2R	QF	1R	1R	2R	3R	QF	1R	A	0 / 10	11–10
French Open	A	A	2R	1R	QF	1R	1R	1R	2R	2R	1R	3R	2R	2R	3R	A	0 / 13	12–13
Wimbledon	A	A	A	1R	A	A	1R	A	A	A	A	1R	A	A	1R	A	0 / 4	0–4
US Open	A	A	1R	2R	3R	2R	1R	1R	QF	1R	1R	QF	2R	QF	1R	A	0 / 13	14–13
Grand Slam SR	0 / 0	0 / 0	0 / 2	0 / 3	0 / 2	0 / 3	0 / 4	0 / 3	0 / 3	0 / 3	0 / 3	0 / 4	0 / 3	0 / 3	0 / 4	0 / 0	0 / 40	N/A
Annual win–loss	0–0	0–0	1–2	1–3	5–2	2–3	0–4	1–3	7–3	1–3	0–3	6–4	4–3	7–3	2–4	0–0	N/A	37–40
ATP Masters Series
Indian Wells	Tournaments Were Not Masters Series Events Before 1990					1R	W	2R	1R	1R	1R	1R	2R	QF	QF	A	1 / 10	11–9
Key Biscayne	Tournaments Were Not Masters Series Events Before 1990					2R	2R	A	2R	1R	QF	3R	SF	2R	2R	A	0 / 9	9–8
Monte-Carlo	Tournaments Were Not Masters Series Events Before 1990					F	QF	1R	1R	1R	F	SF	QF	1R	1R	A	0 / 10	13–10
Rome	Tournaments Were Not Masters Series Events Before 1990					2R	A	2R	2R	F	2R	QF	QF	SF	1R	A	0 / 9	15–9
Hamburg	Tournaments Were Not Masters Series Events Before 1990					2R	SF	1R	1R	2R	2R	QF	W	2R	1R	A	1 / 10	12–8
Montreal / Toronto	Tournaments Were Not Masters Series Events Before 1990					A	A	A	A	A	A	SF	A	A	A	A	0 / 1	2–1
Cincinnati	Tournaments Were Not Masters Series Events Before 1990					A	A	A	A	A	A	A	A	A	A	A	0 / 0	0–0
Madrid (Stuttgart)	Tournaments Were Not Masters Series Events Before 1990					1R	A	2R	A	QF	A	1R	A	1R	A	A	0 / 5	3–5
Paris	Tournaments Were Not Masters Series Events Before 1990					1R	A	1R	A	1R	A	1R	A	2R	A	A	0 / 5	1–5
Masters Series SR	N/A					0 / 7	1 / 4	0 / 6	0 / 5	0 / 7	0 / 5	0 / 8	1 / 5	0 / 7	0 / 5	0 / 0	2 / 59	N/A
Annual win–loss	N/A					4–7	11–3	3–6	1–4	7–7	9–4	10–8	12–4	6–7	3–5	0–0	N/A	66–55
Year-end ranking	442	351	67	76	22	30	36	48	45	26	25	31	22	36	70	257	N/A	

== Junior Grand Slam finals ==
=== Singles: 2 (1–1) ===
Result	Year	Championship	Surface	Opponent	Score
Loss	1986	Wimbledon	Grass	(Mexico) Eduardo Vélez	3–6, 5–7
Win	1986	US Open	Hard	(Argentina) Franco Davín	6–2, 6–2

=== Doubles: 1 (1–0) ===
Result	Year	Championship	Surface	Partner	Opponent	Score
Win	1986	US Open	Hard	(Spain) Tomás Carbonell	(United States) Jeff Tarango (United States) David Wheaton	6–4, 1–6, 6–1
