= 1984 Bavarian Tennis Championships – Doubles =

Doubles
- 1984 Bavarian Tennis Championships

Final
- Champions: (West Germany) Boris Becker (Poland) Wojtek Fibak
- Runners-up: (United States) Eric Fromm (Romania) Florin Segărceanu
- Score: 6–4, 4–6, 6–1

Events
Singles	Doubles
← 1983 ·	Bavarian Tennis Championships	· 1985 →

Chris Lewis and Pavel Složil were the defending champions, but did not participate this year.

Boris Becker and Wojtek Fibak won the title, defeating Eric Fromm and Florin Segărceanu 6–4, 4–6, 6–1 in the final.

== Seeds ==
1. (South Africa) Bernard Mitton / (United States) Butch Walts (quarterfinals)
2. (United States) Mike Bauer / (Australia) Brad Drewett (first round)
3. (Czechoslovakia) Libor Pimek / (Hungary) Balázs Taróczy (quarterfinals)
4. (United Kingdom) John Lloyd / (Australia) Wally Masur (quarterfinals)

== Draw ==
Key

- Q = Qualifier
- WC = Wild card
- LL = Lucky loser
- Alt = Alternate
- ITF = ITF entry
- PR = Protected ranking
- SR = Special ranking
- SE = Special exempt
- JE = Junior exempt
- JR = Junior Accelerator Programme entrant
- CO = College Accelerator Programme entrant
- NG = Next Gen Accelerator Program entrant
- w/o = Walkover
- r = Retired
- d = Defaulted

=== Draw ===
First round
1	(South Africa) B Mitton (United States) B Walts	6	6
(Chile) Á Fillol (Chile) J Fillol	3	4
(United States) CB Cox (West Germany) P Elter	6	7	2
(United States) E Fromm (Romania) F Segărceanu	7	6	6
4	(United Kingdom) J Lloyd (Australia) W Masur	6	6
(West Germany) H Schwaier (West Germany) E Jelen	0	4
(West Germany) A Maurer (West Germany) W Popp	7	6
(France) C Roger-Vasselin (Spain) G Urpí	6	3
(Spain) A Tous (Spain) Juan Carlos Andrade	4	6	0
(Australia) C Fancutt (Australia) J Frawley	6	1	6
(Czechoslovakia) T Šmíd (Czechoslovakia) J Čihák	6	2	6
3	(Czechoslovakia) L Pimek (Hungary) B Taróczy	4	6	7
(United States) S Brawley (Czechoslovakia) J Navrátil	6	6	2
(West Germany) H-D Beutel (West Germany) D Keretić	3	7	6
(West Germany) B Becker (Poland) W Fibak	6	6	6
2	(United States) M Bauer (Australia) B Drewett	4	7	3

Quarterfinals
1	(South Africa) B Mitton (United States) B Walts	6	3	5
(United States) E Fromm (Romania) F Segărceanu	3	6	7
4	(United Kingdom) J Lloyd (Australia) W Masur	2	7	4
(West Germany) A Maurer (West Germany) W Popp	6	6	6
(Australia) C Fancutt (Australia) J Frawley	6	6
3	(Czechoslovakia) L Pimek (Hungary) B Taróczy	2	1
(West Germany) H-D Beutel (West Germany) D Keretić	2	6	3
(West Germany) B Becker (Poland) W Fibak	6	3	6

Semifinals
(United States) E Fromm (Romania) F Segărceanu	6	6
(West Germany) A Maurer (West Germany) W Popp	3	2
(Australia) C Fancutt (Australia) J Frawley	1	2
(West Germany) B Becker (Poland) W Fibak	6	6

Final
(United States) E Fromm (Romania) F Segărceanu	4	6	1
(West Germany) B Becker (Poland) W Fibak	6	4	6
