= 1988 Bavarian Tennis Championships =

- Date: 2–8 May
- Edition: 72nd
- Category: Grand Prix
- Draw: 48S / 24D
- Prize money: $165,000
- Surface: Clay / outdoor
- Location: Munich, West Germany
- Venue: MTTC Iphitos

Champions

Singles
- (Argentina) Guillermo Pérez Roldán

Doubles
- (United States) Rick Leach / (United States) Jim Pugh
← 1987 ·	Bavarian Tennis Championships	· 1989 →

The 1988 Bavarian Tennis Championships was an Association of Tennis Professionals men's tennis tournament held on outdoor clay courts in Munich, West Germany. It was the 72nd edition of the tournament and was held from 2 May through 8 May 1988. Sixth-seeded Guillermo Pérez Roldán won his second consecutive title at the event.

== Finals ==
=== Singles ===
(Argentina) Guillermo Pérez Roldán defeated (Sweden) Jonas Svensson 7–5, 6–3

- It was Pérez-Roldán's 1st title of the year and the 4th of his career.

=== Doubles ===
(United States) Rick Leach / (United States) Jim Pugh defeated (Argentina) Alberto Mancini / (Argentina) Christian Miniussi 7–6, 6–1

- It was Leach's 3rd title of the year and the 5th of his career. It was Pugh's 2nd title of the year and the 5th of his career.
