= 1990 BMW Open – Singles =

Singles
- 1990 BMW Open

Final
- Champion: (Czechoslovakia) Karel Nováček
- Runner-up: (Austria) Thomas Muster
- Score: 6–4, 6–2

Details
- Draw: 32
- Seeds: 8

Events
| Singles | Doubles |
| ← 1989 · | BMW Open | · 1991 → |

Andrei Chesnokov was the defending champion, but did not participate this year.

Karel Nováček won the title, defeating Thomas Muster 6–4, 6–2 in the final.

== Seeds ==
1. (Sweden) Stefan Edberg (second round)
2. (United States) Aaron Krickstein (second round)
3. (United States) Michael Chang (first round)
4. (United States) Jim Courier (quarterfinals)
5. (West Germany) Carl-Uwe Steeb (second round)
6. (United States) Pete Sampras (first round)
7. (Argentina) Guillermo Pérez Roldán (first round)
8. (Austria) Horst Skoff (first round)

== Draw ==
=== Key ===
- Q = Qualifier
- WC = Wild card
- LL = Lucky loser
- Alt = Alternate
- SE = Special exempt
- PR = Protected ranking
- ITF = ITF entry
- JE = Junior exempt
- w/o = Walkover
- r = Retired
- d = Defaulted
- SR = Special ranking

=== Finals ===
Semifinals
(Austria) Thomas Muster | 6 | 6
(Czechoslovakia) Petr Korda | 3 | 1
(Sweden) Jonas Svensson | 1 | 6 | 1
(Czechoslovakia) Karel Nováček | 6 | 2 | 6

Final
(Austria) Thomas Muster | 4 | 2
(Czechoslovakia) Karel Nováček | 6 | 6

=== Top half ===
First round
1 | (Sweden) S Edberg | 6 | 6
(South Africa) C van Rensburg | 1 | 0
(Czechoslovakia) M Střelba | 6 | 6
Q | (Italy) S Pescosolido | 3 | 2
(United States) T Witsken | 3 | 3
(Sweden) M Gustafsson | 6 | 6
(Austria) T Muster | 6 | 6
7 | (Argentina) G Pérez Roldán | 4 | 4
WC/3 | (United States) M Chang | 7 | 5 | 6
(Czechoslovakia) P Korda | 6 | 7 | 7
Q | (Mexico) J Lozano | 3 | 6 | 4
(United States) K Curren | 6 | 4 | 6
(France) Y Noah | 2 | 4
(West Germany) J Wöhrmann | 6 | 6
(Sweden) J Gunnarsson | 2 | 4
5 | (West Germany) C-U Steeb | 6 | 6

Second round
1 | (Sweden) S Edberg | 4 | 1
(Czechoslovakia) M Střelba | 6 | 6
(Sweden) M Gustafsson | 5 | 2
(Austria) T Muster | 7 | 6
(Czechoslovakia) P Korda | 7 | 6
(United States) K Curren | 5 | 1
(West Germany) J Wöhrmann | 7 | 6
6 | (West Germany) C-U Steeb | 5 | 4

Quarterfinals
(Czechoslovakia) M Střelba | 3^{r}
(Austria) T Muster | 4
(Czechoslovakia) P Korda | 6 | 7
(West Germany) J Wöhrmann | 3 | 5

Semifinals
(Austria) T Muster | 6 | 6
(Czechoslovakia) P Korda | 3 | 1

=== Bottom half ===
First round
6 | (United States) P Sampras | 0 | 1
(Sweden) J Svensson | 6 | 6
(Czechoslovakia) M Šrejber | 7 | 6
(Socialist Federal Republic of Yugoslavia) G Prpić | 6 | 3
(Socialist Federal Republic of Yugoslavia) B Orešar | 7 | 6 | 6
(West Germany) M Stich | 6 | 7 | 4
(Italy) P Canè | 6 | 2
4 | (United States) J Courier | 7 | 6
8 | (Austria) H Skoff | 2 | 6 | 3
Q | (Sweden) C Bergström | 6 | 4 | 6
(Sweden) P Lundgren | 4 | 7 | 3
WC | (West Germany) U Riglewski | 6 | 6 | 6
WC | (West Germany) H Schwaier | 3 | 4
(Czechoslovakia) K Nováček | 6 | 6
Q | (Argentina) H de la Peña | 6 | 6 | 3
2 | (United States) A Krickstein | 2 | 7 | 6

Second round
(Sweden) J Svensson | 6 | 1
(Czechoslovakia) M Šrejber | 1 | 0^{r}
(Socialist Federal Republic of Yugoslavia) B Orešar | 2 | 1
4 | (United States) J Courier | 6 | 6
Q | (Sweden) C Bergström | 6 | 4 | 6
WC | (West Germany) U Riglewski | 1 | 6 | 0
(Czechoslovakia) K Nováček | 6 | 7
2 | (United States) A Krickstein | 2 | 6

Quarterfinals
(Sweden) J Svensson | 3 | 6 | 6
4 | (United States) J Courier | 6 | 3 | 4
Q | (Sweden) C Bergström | 1 | 1
(Czechoslovakia) K Nováček | 6 | 6

Semifinals
(Sweden) J Svensson | 1 | 6 | 1
(Czechoslovakia) K Nováček | 6 | 2 | 6
