= 1990 BMW Open – Doubles =

Doubles
- 1990 BMW Open

Final
- Champions: (West Germany) Udo Riglewski (West Germany) Michael Stich
- Runners-up: (Czechoslovakia) Petr Korda (Czechoslovakia) Tomáš Šmíd
- Score: 6–1, 6–4

Details
- Draw: 16
- Seeds: 4

Events
Singles	Doubles
← 1989 ·	BMW Open	· 1991 →

Javier Sánchez and Balázs Taróczy were the defending champions, but did not participate this year.

Udo Riglewski and Michael Stich won the title, defeating Petr Korda and Tomáš Šmíd 6–1, 6–4 in the final.

== Seeds ==
1. (Mexico) Jorge Lozano / (United States) Todd Witsken (semifinals)
2. (United States) Kevin Curren / (Australia) Laurie Warder (quarterfinals)
3. (United States) Jim Courier / (United States) Pete Sampras (first round)
4. (Czechoslovakia) Petr Korda / (Czechoslovakia) Tomáš Šmíd (final)

== Draw ==
=== Key ===
- Q = Qualifier
- WC = Wild card
- LL = Lucky loser
- Alt = Alternate
- SE = Special exempt
- PR = Protected ranking
- ITF = ITF entry
- JE = Junior exempt
- w/o = Walkover
- r = Retired
- d = Defaulted
- SR = Special ranking

=== Draw ===
First round
1	(Mexico) J Lozano (United States) T Witsken	6	6	6
(West Germany) P Ballauff (West Germany) R Osterthun	7	1	2
(Italy) N Bruno (Italy) S Pescosolido	6	6
(Sweden) S Edberg (Sweden) J Gunnarsson	2	2
4	(Czechoslovakia) P Korda (Czechoslovakia) T Šmíd	7	1	7
(Italy) P Canè (France) Y Noah	6	6	6
(Sweden) P Lundgren (Sweden) J Svensson	4	6
(Sweden) R Båthman (Sweden) R Bergh	6	7
(Czechoslovakia) J Čihák (Czechoslovakia) C Suk	6	6	4
(Iran) M Bahrami (Argentina) G Pérez Roldán	4	7	6
Q	(Argentina) H de la Peña (Italy) G Pozzi	6	6
3	(United States) J Courier (United States) P Sampras	2	2
(West Germany) C-U Steeb (West Germany) J Wöhrmann	3	6
(West Germany) U Riglewski (West Germany) M Stich	6	7
(Czechoslovakia) K Nováček (Czechoslovakia) M Šrejber	6	6	3
2	(United States) K Curren (Australia) L Warder	3	7	6

Quarterfinals
1	(Mexico) J Lozano (United States) T Witsken	2	6	6
(Italy) N Bruno (Italy) S Pescosolido	6	1	3
4	(Czechoslovakia) P Korda (Czechoslovakia) T Šmíd	6	6
(Sweden) R Båthman (Sweden) R Bergh	3	3
(Iran) M Bahrami (Argentina) G Pérez Roldán	3	6	4
Q	(Argentina) H de la Peña (Italy) G Pozzi	6	2	6
(West Germany) U Riglewski (West Germany) M Stich	6	4	6
2	(United States) K Curren (Australia) L Warder	3	6	3

Semifinals
1	(Mexico) J Lozano (United States) T Witsken	0	3
4	(Czechoslovakia) P Korda (Czechoslovakia) T Šmíd	6	6
Q	(Argentina) H de la Peña (Italy) G Pozzi	4	3
(West Germany) U Riglewski (West Germany) M Stich	6	6

Final
4	(Czechoslovakia) P Korda (Czechoslovakia) T Šmíd	1	4
(West Germany) U Riglewski (West Germany) M Stich	6	6
