= 1991 BMW Open – Singles =

Singles
- 1991 BMW Open

Final
- Champion: (Sweden) Magnus Gustafsson
- Runner-up: (Argentina) Guillermo Pérez Roldán
- Score: 3–6, 6–3, 4–3 ret

Details
- Draw: 32
- Seeds: 8

Events
Singles	Doubles
← 1990 ·	BMW Open	· 1992 →

The 1991 BMW Open Singles was the singles bracket of the 1991 BMW Open. The title was won by Magnus Gustafsson, defeating Guillermo Pérez Roldán. Roldán retired while Gustafsson was leading 3–6, 6–3, 4–3. Karel Nováček, the defending champion from the prior year singles event, did not participate.

== Seeds ==
1. (Czechoslovakia) Ivan Lendl (semifinals)
2. (Socialist Federal Republic of Yugoslavia) Goran Ivanišević (semifinals)
3. (Sweden) Jonas Svensson (first round)
4. (United States) John McEnroe (first round)
5. (Austria) Thomas Muster (first round)
6. (Germany) Michael Stich (first round)
7. (Argentina) Guillermo Pérez Roldán (final)
8. (Soviet Union) Alexander Volkov (first round)

== Draw ==
=== Key ===
- Q = Qualifier
- WC = Wild card
- LL = Lucky loser
- Alt = Alternate
- SE = Special exempt
- PR = Protected ranking
- ITF = ITF entry
- JE = Junior exempt
- w/o = Walkover
- r = Retired
- d = Defaulted
- SR = Special ranking

=== Finals ===
Semifinals
1	(Czechoslovakia) Ivan Lendl	4	5
(Sweden) Magnus Gustafsson	6	7
(Sweden) Christian Bergström	0	0
7	(Argentina) Guillermo Pérez Roldán	6	6

Final
(Sweden) Magnus Gustafsson	3	6	4
7	(Argentina) Guillermo Pérez Roldán	6	3	3^{r}

=== Top half ===
First round
1	(Czechoslovakia) I Lendl	6	6
(Germany) A Mronz	2	2
(Australia) M Woodforde	3	2
(Socialist Federal Republic of Yugoslavia) G Prpić	6	6
LL	(Argentina) E Bengoechea	4	7	6
(Argentina) H de la Peña	6	5	1
(United States) T Witsken	1	7	6
8	(Soviet Union) A Volkov	6	5	1
3	(Sweden) J Svensson	4	1
(Sweden) A Järryd	6	6
WC	(Argentina) A Mancini	4	3
WC	(Germany) U Riglewski	6	6
(Israel) A Mansdorf	4	2
(Austria) H Skoff	6	6
(Sweden) M Gustafsson	5	6	6
6	(Germany) M Stich	7	4	3

Second round
1	(Czechoslovakia) I Lendl	3	6	6
(Socialist Federal Republic of Yugoslavia) G Prpić	6	4	2
LL	(Argentina) E Bengoechea	4	6	4
(United States) T Witsken	6	3	6
(Sweden) A Järryd	6	4	6^{3}
WC	(Germany) U Riglewski	4	6	7^{7}
(Austria) H Skoff	0	6	4
(Sweden) M Gustafsson	6	4	6

Quarterfinals
1	(Czechoslovakia) I Lendl	3	6	7
(United States) T Witsken	6	4	5
(Germany) U Riglewski	2	5
(Sweden) M Gustafsson	6	7

Semifinals
1	(Czechoslovakia) I Lendl	4	5
(Sweden) M Gustafsson	6	7

=== Bottom half ===
First round
5	(Austria) T Muster	1	6	3
(Sweden) C Bergström	6	2	6
(Czechoslovakia) M Vajda	7^{7}	6
(Germany) C-U Steeb	6^{3}	2
Q	(Soviet Union) A Medvedev	3	5
(Sweden) L Jönsson	6	7
Q	(Romania) D Pescariu	6	6
4	(United States) J McEnroe	2	2
7	(Argentina) G Pérez Roldán	6	6
(Spain) J Aguilera	3	0
Q	(Sweden) D Engel	6	6
Q	(Germany) P Vojtíšek	3	3
(Germany) E Jelen	3	6	6
(Haiti) R Agénor	6	4	0
WC	(Germany) J Wöhrmann	6^{2}	1
2	(Socialist Federal Republic of Yugoslavia) G Ivanišević	7^{7}	6

Second round
(Sweden) C Bergström	6	6
(Czechoslovakia) M Vajda	2	4
(Sweden) L Jönsson	6	6
Q	(Romania) D Pescariu	0	4
7	(Argentina) G Pérez Roldán	7	6
Q	(Sweden) D Engel	5	2
(Germany) E Jelen	4	6	3
2	(Socialist Federal Republic of Yugoslavia) G Ivanišević	6	4	6

Quarterfinals
(Sweden) C Bergström	4	6	6
(Sweden) L Jönsson	6	2	0
7	(Argentina) G Pérez Roldán	7^{7}	6
2	(Socialist Federal Republic of Yugoslavia) G Ivanišević	6^{5}	1

Semifinals
(Sweden) C Bergström	0	0
7	(Argentina) G Pérez Roldán	6	6
