= 1988 Bavarian Tennis Championships – Singles =

Singles
- 1988 Bavarian Tennis Championships

Final
- Champion: (Argentina) Guillermo Pérez Roldán
- Runner-up: (Sweden) Jonas Svensson
- Score: 7–5, 6–3

Details
- Draw: 48
- Seeds: 16

Events
Singles	Doubles
← 1987 ·	Bavarian Tennis Championships	· 1989 →

Guillermo Pérez Roldán was the defending champion.

Pérez-Roldán successfully defended his title, defeating Jonas Svensson, 7–5, 6–3 in the final.

== Seeds ==
1. (Sweden) Anders Järryd (quarterfinals)
2. (Spain) Emilio Sánchez (semifinals)
3. (Sweden) Joakim Nyström (second round)
4. (Soviet Union) Andrei Chesnokov (quarterfinals)
5. (Sweden) Jonas Svensson (final)
6. (Argentina) Guillermo Pérez Roldán (champion)
7. (Switzerland) Jakob Hlasek (third round)
8. (Argentina) Eduardo Bengoechea (second round)
9. (West Germany) Carl-Uwe Steeb (quarterfinals)
10. (Haiti) Ronald Agénor (third round)
11. (Spain) Jordi Arrese (third round)
12. (United States) Jim Pugh (second round)
13. (West Germany) Tore Meinecke (quarterfinals)
14. (Australia) Darren Cahill (second round)
15. (France) Jérôme Potier (second round)
16. (Argentina) Alberto Mancini (third round)

== Draw ==
Key

- Q = Qualifier
- WC = Wild card
- LL = Lucky loser
- Alt = Alternate
- ITF = ITF entry
- PR = Protected ranking
- SR = Special ranking
- SE = Special exempt
- JE = Junior exempt
- JR = Junior Accelerator Programme entrant
- CO = College Accelerator Programme entrant
- NG = Next Gen Accelerator Program entrant
- w/o = Walkover
- r = Retired
- d = Defaulted

=== Finals ===
Semifinals
(Australia) Wally Masur	4	2
6	(Argentina) Guillermo Pérez Roldán	6	6
5	(Sweden) Jonas Svensson	6	6	6
2	(Spain) Emilio Sánchez	7	1	4

Final
6	(Argentina) Guillermo Pérez Roldán	7	6
5	(Sweden) Jonas Svensson	5	3

=== Top half ===
==== Section 1 ====
First round
(Spain) S Casal	6	6	7
(West Germany) R Osterthun	3	7	6
(Australia) B Dyke	3	6	3
(Uruguay) M Filippini	6	4	6
(Spain) J Sánchez	6	6
(Czechoslovakia) J Navrátil	1	3
(Austria) A Antonitsch	4	1
(Australia) W Masur	6	6

Second round
1	(Sweden) A Järryd	6	6
(Spain) S Casal	4	3
(Uruguay) M Filippini	3	4
16	(Argentina) A Mancini	6	6
10	(Haiti) R Agénor	6	3	6
(Spain) J Sánchez	3	6	3
(Australia) W Masur	6	6
8	(Argentina) E Bengoechea	3	0

Third round
1	(Sweden) A Järryd	6	6
16	(Argentina) A Mancini	4	3
10	(Haiti) R Agénor	6	6	5
(Australia) W Masur	2	7	7

Quarterfinals
1	(Sweden) A Järryd	5	2
(Australia) W Masur	7	6

==== Section 2 ====
First round
(Czechoslovakia) B Stankovič	7	6
(Sweden) N Kroon	5	2
WC	(West Germany) H Schwaier	6	7
WC	(West Germany) M Rackl	2	6
Q	(Argentina) F Davín	6	6	5
Q	(Spain) E Osta	7	0	7
(Sweden) P Lindgren	5	6	6
(Belgium) E Masso	7	4	7

Second round
4	(Soviet Union) A Chesnokov	6	6
(Czechoslovakia) B Stankovič	3	4
WC	(West Germany) H Schwaier	1	6	7
14	(Australia) D Cahill	6	4	6
11	(Spain) J Arrese	6	6
Q	(Spain) E Osta	4	4
(Belgium) E Masso	3	2
6	(Argentina) G Pérez Roldán	6	6

Third round
4	(Soviet Union) A Chesnokov	6	6
WC	(West Germany) H Schwaier	0	4
11	(Spain) J Arrese	3	2
6	(Argentina) G Pérez Roldán	6	6

Quarterfinals
4	(Soviet Union) A Chesnokov	1	2
6	(Argentina) G Pérez Roldán	6	6

=== Bottom half ===
==== Section 3 ====
First round
(Argentina) C Miniussi	3	6	6
(Argentina) G Vilas	6	2	2
Q	(Sweden) L-A Wahlgren	5	3
(Czechoslovakia) K Nováček	7	6
WC	(West Germany) M Westphal	1	2
(New Zealand) D Lewis	6	6
(Czechoslovakia) P Korda	2	6	6
(Sweden) U Stenlund	6	4	3

Second round
5	(Sweden) J Svensson	7	6
(Argentina) C Miniussi	5	2
(Czechoslovakia) K Nováček	6	7
12	(United States) J Pugh	3	6
13	(West Germany) T Meinecke	6	6
(New Zealand) D Lewis	1	3
(Czechoslovakia) P Korda	1	6	6
3	(Sweden) J Nyström	6	4	1

Third round
5	(Sweden) J Svensson	6	6
(Czechoslovakia) K Nováček	3	3
13	(West Germany) T Meinecke	6	3	6
(Czechoslovakia) P Korda	4	6	3

Quarterfinals
5	(Sweden) J Svensson	3	6	6
13	(West Germany) T Meinecke	6	3	2

==== Section 4 ====
First round
Q	(Argentina) R Argüello	4	6	6
Q	(Australia) R Fromberg	6	2	7
(Italy) M Narducci	3	6
(Czechoslovakia) J Čihák	6	7
Q	(Argentina) R Azar	6	6
(West Germany) P Vojtischek	4	4
(Argentina) F Yunis	6	6
(Brazil) C Motta	3	4

Second round
7	(Switzerland) J Hlasek	1	6	7
Q	(Australia) R Fromberg	6	2	6
(Czechoslovakia) J Čihák	4	2
9	(West Germany) C-U Steeb	6	6
15	(France) J Potier	4	4
Q	(Argentina) R Azar	6	6
(Argentina) F Yunis	0	1
2	(Spain) E Sánchez	6	6

Third round
7	(Switzerland) J Hlasek	6	6	3
9	(West Germany) C-U Steeb	3	7	6
Q	(Argentina) R Azar	1	7	4
2	(Spain) E Sánchez	6	5	6

Quarterfinals
9	(West Germany) C-U Steeb	4	2
2	(Spain) E Sánchez	6	6
