= 1988 Bavarian Tennis Championships – Doubles =

Doubles
- 1988 Bavarian Tennis Championships

Final
- Champions: (United States) Rick Leach; (United States) Jim Pugh
- Runners-up: (Argentina) Alberto Mancini; (Argentina) Christian Miniussi
- Score: 7–6, 6–1

Events
Singles	Doubles
← 1987 ·	Bavarian Tennis Championships	· 1989 →

Jim Pugh and Blaine Willenborg were the defending champions, but Willenborg did not participate this year. Pugh partnered Rick Leach

Leach and Pugh won the title, defeating Alberto Mancini and Christian Miniussi 7–6, 6–1 in the final.

== Seeds ==
All seeds receive a bye into the second round.

1. (Spain) Sergio Casal / (Spain) Emilio Sánchez (second round)
2. (Sweden) Anders Järryd / (Sweden) Joakim Nyström (second round)
3. (United States) Rick Leach / (United States) Jim Pugh (champions)
4. (Australia) Darren Cahill / (Australia) Laurie Warder (second round)
5. (Czechoslovakia) Stanislav Birner / (Czechoslovakia) Jaroslav Navrátil (quarterfinals)
6. (Australia) Broderick Dyke / (Australia) Wally Masur (quarterfinals)
7. (Australia) Carl Limberger / (Italy) Claudio Panatta (second round)
8. (West Germany) Tore Meinecke / (West Germany) Ricki Osterthun (quarterfinals)

== Draw ==
Key

- Q = Qualifier
- WC = Wild card
- LL = Lucky loser
- Alt = Alternate
- ITF = ITF entry
- PR = Protected ranking
- SR = Special ranking
- SE = Special exempt
- JE = Junior exempt
- JR = Junior Accelerator Programme entrant
- CO = College Accelerator Programme entrant
- NG = Next Gen Accelerator Program entrant
- w/o = Walkover
- r = Retired
- d = Defaulted

=== Finals ===
Semifinals

Final

- (Czechoslovakia) Josef Čihák
- (Czechoslovakia) Karel Nováček
3
3

3
- (United States) Rick Leach
- (United States) Jim Pugh
6
6

3
- (United States) Rick Leach
- (United States) Jim Pugh
7
6

- (Argentina) Alberto Mancini
- (Argentina) Christian Miniussi
6
1

- (Spain) Tomás Carbonell
- (Brazil) Danilo Marcelino
5
6
1

- (Argentina) Alberto Mancini
- (Argentina) Christian Miniussi
7
4
6

=== Top half ===
First round

Second round

Quarterfinals

Semifinals

1
- (Spain) S Casal
- (Spain) E Sánchez
3
6
2

- (Australia) J Stoltenberg
- (Australia) T Woodbridge
6
3
6

- (Australia) J Stoltenberg
- (Australia) T Woodbridge
6
4
6

- (Sweden) R Båthman
- (Spain) J López-Maeso
4
6
3

- (Australia) J Stoltenberg
- (Australia) T Woodbridge
6
3
6

- (Czechoslovakia) J Čihák
- (Czechoslovakia) K Nováček
2
6
6

- (Czechoslovakia) J Čihák
- (Czechoslovakia) K Nováček
4
6
7

- (West Germany) W Popp
- (West Germany) U Riglewski
6
2
2

- (Czechoslovakia) J Čihák
- (Czechoslovakia) K Nováček
6
6

7
- (Australia) C Limberger
- (Italy) C Panatta
2
2

- (Czechoslovakia) J Čihák
- (Czechoslovakia) K Nováček
3
3

3
- (United States) R Leach
- (United States) J Pugh
6
6

3
- (United States) R Leach
- (United States) J Pugh
3
6
6

- (Iran) M Bahrami
- (France) J Potier
7
6

- (Iran) M Bahrami
- (France) J Potier
6
3
4

WC
- (Sweden) J Apell
- (Sweden) P Nyborg
6
3

3
- (United States) R Leach
- (United States) J Pugh
7
6

WC
- (West Germany) A Mronz
- (West Germany) P Vojtischek
6
6

6
- (Australia) B Dyke
- (Australia) W Masur
6
3

- (Sweden) D Engel
- (Sweden) J Svensson
7
7

- (Sweden) D Engel
- (Sweden) J Svensson
4
4

6
- (Australia) B Dyke
- (Australia) W Masur
6
6

=== Bottom half ===
First round

Second round

Quarterfinals

Semifinals

5
- (Czechoslovakia) S Birner
- (Czechoslovakia) J Navrátil
6
7

- (Czechoslovakia) P Korda
- (Czechoslovakia) C Suk
5
3

- (Mexico) L Lavalle
- (Italy) D Nargiso
3
5

- (Mexico) L Lavalle
- (Italy) D Nargiso
7
6

5
- (Czechoslovakia) S Birner
- (Czechoslovakia) J Navrátil
1
4

- (Spain) T Carbonell
- (Brazil) D Marcelino
7
6

- (Spain) T Carbonell
- (Brazil) D Marcelino
6
6

- (Austria) A Antonitsch
- (United States) L Jensen
5
3

- (Spain) T Carbonell
- (Brazil) D Marcelino
6
6

4
- (Australia) D Cahill
- (Australia) L Warder
2
3

- (Spain) T Carbonell
- (Brazil) D Marcelino
5
6
1

- (Argentina) A Mancini
- (Argentina) C Miniussi
7
4
6

8
- (West Germany) T Meinecke
- (West Germany) R Osterthun
6
3
6

- (Switzerland) J Hlasek
- (Brazil) C Motta
4
6
4

- (Spain) J Sánchez
- (West Germany) C-U Steeb
1
6
3

- (Spain) J Sánchez
- (West Germany) C-U Steeb
6
4
6

8
- (West Germany) T Meinecke
- (West Germany) R Osterthun
6
3
5

- (Italy) S Colombo
- (New Zealand) D Lewis
1
4

- (Argentina) A Mancini
- (Argentina) C Miniussi
2
6
7

- (Argentina) A Mancini
- (Argentina) C Miniussi
6
6

- (Argentina) A Mancini
- (Argentina) C Miniussi
6
3
7

2
- (Sweden) A Järryd
- (Sweden) J Nyström
3
6
6
