= 1991 BMW Open – Doubles =

Doubles
- 1991 BMW Open

Final
- Champions: (United States) Patrick Galbraith (United States) Todd Witsken
- Runners-up: (Sweden) Anders Järryd (South Africa) Danie Visser
- Score: 7–5, 6–4

Details
- Draw: 16
- Seeds: 4

Events
Singles	Doubles
← 1990 ·	BMW Open	· 1992 →

Udo Riglewski and Michael Stich were the defending champions, but lost in the semifinals this year.

Patrick Galbraith and Todd Witsken won the title, defeating Anders Järryd and Danie Visser 7–5, 6–4 in the final.

== Seeds ==
1. (Germany) Udo Riglewski / (Germany) Michael Stich (semifinals)
2. (Sweden) Anders Järryd / (South Africa) Danie Visser (final)
3. (United States) Patrick Galbraith / (United States) Todd Witsken (champions)
4. (Australia) Broderick Dyke / (Australia) Laurie Warder (semifinals)

== Draw ==
=== Key ===
- Q = Qualifier
- WC = Wild card
- LL = Lucky loser
- Alt = Alternate
- SE = Special exempt
- PR = Protected ranking
- ITF = ITF entry
- JE = Junior exempt
- w/o = Walkover
- r = Retired
- d = Defaulted
- SR = Special ranking

=== Draw ===
First round
1	(Germany) U Riglewski (Germany) M Stich	6	5	6
(Argentina) H de la Peña (Argentina) G Pérez Roldán	1	7	2
(Sweden) M Gustafsson (Sweden) J Svensson	6	3	6
(Socialist Federal Republic of Yugoslavia) G Ivanišević (Czechoslovakia) I Lendl	3	6	4
3	(United States) P Galbraith (United States) T Witsken	6	1	6
(Czechoslovakia) J Čihák (Australia) D Macpherson	4	6	4
(Argentina) P Albano (Sweden) D Engel	6	7
(South Africa) W Ferreira (Russia) A Olhovskiy	1	5
(United States) C Beckman (United States) S Cannon	6	6
(Germany) E Jelen (Germany) A Mronz	4	3
Q	(Germany) H Rittersbacher (Argentina) F Yunis	6	1	4
4	(Australia) B Dyke (Australia) L Warder	4	6	6
(The Bahamas) R Smith (Sweden) T Svantesson	7	6
WC	(Argentina) A Mancini (Germany) J Wöhrmann	6	4
LL	(Hungary) Károly György (Hungary) T György
2	(Sweden) A Järryd (South Africa) D Visser	w/o

Quarterfinals
1	(Germany) U Riglewski (Germany) M Stich	6	6
(Sweden) M Gustafsson (Sweden) J Svensson	4	4
3	(United States) P Galbraith (United States) T Witsken	6	6
(Argentina) P Albano (Sweden) D Engel	4	3
(United States) C Beckman (United States) S Cannon	6	4	4
4	(Australia) B Dyke (Australia) L Warder	4	6	6
(The Bahamas) R Smith (Sweden) T Svantesson	3	3
2	(Sweden) A Järryd (South Africa) D Visser	6	6

Semifinals
1	(Germany) U Riglewski (Germany) M Stich	3	7	5
3	(United States) P Galbraith (United States) T Witsken	6	6	7
4	(Australia) B Dyke (Australia) L Warder	1	3
2	(Sweden) A Järryd (South Africa) D Visser	6	6

Final
3	(United States) P Galbraith (United States) T Witsken	7	6
2	(Sweden) A Järryd (South Africa) D Visser	5	4
