= 1984 Bavarian Tennis Championships – Singles =

Singles
- 1984 Bavarian Tennis Championships

Final
- Champion: (Czechoslovakia) Libor Pimek
- Runner-up: (United States) Gene Mayer
- Score: 6–4, 4–6, 7–6, 6–4

Details
- Draw: 32
- Seeds: 8

Events
Singles	Doubles
← 1983 ·	Bavarian Tennis Championships	· 1985 →

Tomáš Šmíd was the defending champion, but lost in the first round this year.

Libor Pimek won the title, defeating Gene Mayer 6–4, 4–6, 7–6, 6–4 in the final.

== Seeds ==
1. (Czechoslovakia) Tomáš Šmíd (first round)
2. (United States) Gene Mayer (final)
3. (United States) Brian Teacher (first round)
4. (Poland) Wojtek Fibak (second round)
5. (United States) Mike Bauer (first round)
6. (Australia) Wally Masur (first round)
7. (Hungary) Balázs Taróczy (first round)
8. (United Kingdom) John Lloyd (first round)

== Draw ==
Key

- Q = Qualifier
- WC = Wild card
- LL = Lucky loser
- Alt = Alternate
- ITF = ITF entry
- PR = Protected ranking
- SR = Special ranking
- SE = Special exempt
- JE = Junior exempt
- JR = Junior Accelerator Programme entrant
- CO = College Accelerator Programme entrant
- NG = Next Gen Accelerator Program entrant
- w/o = Walkover
- r = Retired
- d = Defaulted

=== Final ===
Semifinals
(Czechoslovakia) Libor Pimek	6	6
(Australia) John Frawley	3	0
(West Germany) Michael Westphal	2	7	2
2	(United States) Gene Mayer	6	6	6

Final
(Czechoslovakia) Libor Pimek	6	4	7	6
2	(United States) Gene Mayer	4	6	6	4

=== Section 1 ===
First round
1	(Czechoslovakia) T Šmíd	4	4
(Czechoslovakia) L Pimek	6	6
(Spain) A Tous	3	2
(Spain) G Urpí	6	6
WC	(West Germany) A Stepanek	1	6	2
(United States) E Fromm	6	1	6
Q	(West Germany) J Becka	6	6
8	(United Kingdom) J Lloyd	4	2
4	(Poland) W Fibak	6	6
(Chile) A Fillol	4	4
(Australia) J Frawley	6	6
WC	(West Germany) E Jelen	3	1
(West Germany) H Schwaier	6	7
Q	(Romania) F Segărceanu	3	5
(Hungary) Z Kuharszky	6	6
5	(United States) M Bauer	2	3

Second round
(Czechoslovakia) L Pimek	6	6
(Spain) G Urpí	3	2
(United States) E Fromm	3	1
Q	(West Germany) J Becka	6	6
4	(Poland) W Fibak	6	4
(Australia) J Frawley	7	6
(West Germany) H Schwaier	3	6	5
(Hungary) Z Kuharszky	6	3	7

Quarterfinals
(Czechoslovakia) L Pimek	6	6
Q	(West Germany) J Becka	2	1
(Australia) J Frawley	6	6
(Hungary) Z Kuharszky	4	4

Semifinals
(Czechoslovakia) L Pimek	6	6
(Australia) J Frawley	3	0

=== Section 2 ===
First round
7	(Hungary) B Taróczy	1	2
(United States) C Hooper	6	6
Q	(Czechoslovakia) J Čihák	7	6	3
Q	(Czechoslovakia) K Nováček	6	7	6
WC	(West Germany) B Becker	3	6	7
(West Germany) H-D Beutel	6	1	6
(West Germany) M Westphal	3	7	6
3	(United States) B Teacher	6	5	3
6	(Australia) W Masur	5	1
(South Africa) B Mitton	7	6
(West Germany) R Gehring	6	6
(United States) M Doyle	1	4
LL	(West Germany) D Keretić	3	2
(West Germany) A Maurer	6	6
(France) C Roger-Vasselin	3	1
2	(United States) G Mayer	6	6

Second round
(United States) C Hooper	6	6
Q	(Czechoslovakia) K Nováček	4	4
WC	(West Germany) B Becker	7	3	5
(West Germany) M Westphal	6	6	7
(South Africa) B Mitton	6	6
(West Germany) R Gehring	4	4
(West Germany) A Maurer	6	1
2	(United States) G Mayer	7	6

Quarterfinals
(United States) C Hooper	2	6
(West Germany) M Westphal	6	7
(South Africa) B Mitton	2	0
2	(United States) G Mayer	6	6

Semifinals
(West Germany) M Westphal	2	7	2
2	(United States) G Mayer	6	6	6
