= 1986 Bavarian Tennis Championships – Doubles =

Doubles
- 1986 Bavarian Tennis Championships

Final
- Champions: (Spain) Sergio Casal (Spain) Emilio Sánchez
- Runners-up: (Australia) Broderick Dyke (Australia) Wally Masur
- Score: 6–3, 4–6, 6–4

Events
Singles	Doubles
← 1985 ·	Bavarian Tennis Championships	· 1987 →

Mark Edmondson and Kim Warwick were the defending champions, but Warwick did not participate this year. Edmondson partnered Tomáš Šmíd, losing in the semifinals.

Sergio Casal and Emilio Sánchez won the title, defeating Broderick Dyke and Wally Masur 6–3, 4–6, 6–4 in the final.

== Seeds ==
1. (Switzerland) Heinz Günthardt / (Hungary) Balázs Taróczy (first round)
2. (Australia) Mark Edmondson / (Czechoslovakia) Tomáš Šmíd (semifinals)
3. (Israel) Shlomo Glickstein / (Sweden) Hans Simonsson (first round)
4. (Spain) Sergio Casal / (Spain) Emilio Sánchez (champions)

== Draw ==
Key

- Q = Qualifier
- WC = Wild card
- LL = Lucky loser
- Alt = Alternate
- ITF = ITF entry
- PR = Protected ranking
- SR = Special ranking
- SE = Special exempt
- JE = Junior exempt
- JR = Junior Accelerator Programme entrant
- CO = College Accelerator Programme entrant
- NG = Next Gen Accelerator Program entrant
- w/o = Walkover
- r = Retired
- d = Defaulted

=== Draw ===
First round
1	(Switzerland) H Günthardt (Hungary) B Taróczy	3	4
(United Kingdom) J Bates (Netherlands) M Schapers	6	6
(United States) M De Palmer (United States) E Teltscher	6	6	4
(Australia) D Cahill (Australia) M Kratzmann	7	3	6
4	(Spain) S Casal (Spain) E Sánchez	6	6
(Sweden) J Svensson (Sweden) P Carlsson	3	1
(Australia) B Drewett (Israel) A Mansdorf	3	6	6
(South Africa) B Levine (Australia) L Warder	6	3	7
(Australia) B Dyke (Australia) W Masur	6	6
(Argentina) G Luza (Argentina) G Tiberti	4	3
(Sweden) R Båthman (Denmark) M Mortensen	7	6
3	(Israel) S Glickstein (Sweden) H Simonsson	6	2
(Austria) A Antonitsch (Spain) J Bardou	6	6
(Czechoslovakia) J Navrátil (West Germany) W Popp	2	4
WC	(Czechoslovakia) M Mečíř (Belgium) L Pimek	7	3	2
2	(Australia) M Edmondson (Czechoslovakia) T Šmíd	5	6	6

Quarterfinals
(United Kingdom) J Bates (Netherlands) M Schapers	6	7
(Australia) D Cahill (Australia) M Kratzmann	4	5
4	(Spain) S Casal (Spain) E Sánchez	7	6
(South Africa) B Levine (Australia) L Warder	6	4
(Australia) B Dyke (Australia) W Masur	4	6	7
(Sweden) R Båthman (Denmark) M Mortensen	6	3	6
(Austria) A Antonitsch (Spain) J Bardou	4	4
2	(Australia) M Edmondson (Czechoslovakia) T Šmíd	6	6

Semifinals
(United Kingdom) J Bates (Netherlands) M Schapers	6	5	6
4	(Spain) S Casal (Spain) E Sánchez	3	7	7
(Australia) B Dyke (Australia) W Masur	6	6
2	(Australia) M Edmondson (Czechoslovakia) T Šmíd	4	4

Final
4	(Spain) S Casal (Spain) E Sánchez	6	4	6
(Australia) B Dyke (Australia) W Masur	3	6	4
