= 1989 Bavarian Tennis Championships – Singles =

Singles
- 1989 BMW Open

Final
- Champion: (Soviet Union) Andrei Chesnokov
- Runner-up: (Czechoslovakia) Martin Střelba
- Score: 5–7, 7–6, 6–2

Details
- Draw: 48
- Seeds: 16

Events
Singles	Doubles
← 1988 ·	BMW Open	· 1990 →

Guillermo Pérez Roldán was the defending champion, but lost in the quarterfinals this year.

Andrei Chesnokov won the title, defeating Martin Střelba, 5–7, 7–6, 6–2 in the final.

== Seeds ==
1. (Sweden) Stefan Edberg (semifinals)
2. (United States) Jimmy Connors (second round)
3. (Spain) Emilio Sánchez (third round)
4. (Argentina) Guillermo Pérez Roldán (quarterfinals)
5. (Sweden) Jonas Svensson (quarterfinals)
6. (Soviet Union) Andrei Chesnokov (champion)
7. (Argentina) Alberto Mancini (quarterfinals)
8. (Australia) Mark Woodforde (second round)
9. (Soviet Union) Alexander Volkov (semifinals)
10. (United States) Derrick Rostagno (second round)
11. (Sweden) Magnus Gustafsson (third round)
12. (Sweden) Christian Bergström (second round)
13. (West Germany) Patrik Kühnen (second round)
14. (Mexico) Leonardo Lavalle (third round)
15. (West Germany) Carl-Uwe Steeb (third round)
16. (Spain) Javier Sánchez (quarterfinals)

== Draw ==
Key

- Q = Qualifier
- WC = Wild card
- LL = Lucky loser
- Alt = Alternate
- ITF = ITF entry
- PR = Protected ranking
- SR = Special ranking
- SE = Special exempt
- JE = Junior exempt
- JR = Junior Accelerator Programme entrant
- CO = College Accelerator Programme entrant
- NG = Next Gen Accelerator Program entrant
- w/o = Walkover
- r = Retired
- d = Defaulted

=== Finals ===
Semifinals
1	(Sweden) Stefan Edberg	3	3
(Czechoslovakia) Martin Střelba	6	6
6	(Soviet Union) Andrei Chesnokov	6	7
9	(Soviet Union) Alexander Volkov	2	5

Final
(Czechoslovakia) Martin Střelba	7	6	2
6	(Soviet Union) Andrei Chesnokov	5	7	6

=== Top half ===
==== Section 1 ====
First round
(Soviet Union) A Võsand	6	6
WC	(Sweden) T Enqvist	1	2
(West Germany) T Meinecke	7	6
(Czechoslovakia) J Bulant	6	3
(Austria) S Lochbihler	0	1
(Czechoslovakia) K Nováček	6	6
(Socialist Federal Republic of Yugoslavia) G Prpić	6	2	2
WC	(West Germany) R Osterthun	1	6	6

Second round
1	(Sweden) S Edberg	6	3	7
(Soviet Union) A Võsand	3	6	5
(West Germany) T Meinecke	3	2
15	(West Germany) C-U Steeb	6	6
10	(United States) D Rostagno	2	3
(Czechoslovakia) K Nováček	6	6
WC	(West Germany) R Osterthun	1	3
7	(Argentina) A Mancini	6	6

Third round
1	(Sweden) S Edberg	6	6
15	(West Germany) C-U Steeb	2	4
(Czechoslovakia) K Nováček	4	3
7	(Argentina) A Mancini	6	6

Quarterfinals
1	(Sweden) S Edberg	7	6
7	(Argentina) A Mancini	6	2

==== Section 2 ====
First round
(West Germany) M Rackl	4	3
(Australia) J Frawley	6	6
(Czechoslovakia) M Střelba	4	7	7
(Argentina) M Ingaramo	6	5	6
(Sweden) N Kulti	4	1
(Sweden) J Gunnarsson	6	6
(United States) M Robertson	6	6	6
(Argentina) R Azar	4	7	7

Second round
3	(Spain) E Sánchez	6	6
(Australia) J Frawley	1	3
(Czechoslovakia) M Střelba	6	7
13	(West Germany) P Kühnen	3	6
12	(Sweden) C Bergström	3	4
(Sweden) J Gunnarsson	6	6
(Argentina) R Azar	2	7	1
5	(Sweden) J Svensson	6	5	6

Third round
3	(Spain) E Sánchez	6	2	4
(Czechoslovakia) M Střelba	4	6	6
(Sweden) J Gunnarsson	2	7	3
5	(Sweden) J Svensson	6	6	6

Quarterfinals
(Czechoslovakia) M Střelba	6	6
5	(Sweden) J Svensson	4	2

=== Bottom half ===
==== Section 3 ====
First round
WC	(West Germany) H Schwaier	6	4	6
(Argentina) F Davín	4	6	2
(Soviet Union) A Olhovskiy	2	6	6
(Spain) S Casal	6	4	4
(Czechoslovakia) T Šmíd	4	3
(West Germany) M Stich	6	6
Q	(West Germany) K Braasch	0	3
(Soviet Union) A Cherkasov	6	6

Second round
6	(Soviet Union) A Chesnokov	6	6
WC	(West Germany) H Schwaier	4	2
(Soviet Union) A Olhovskiy	0	4
11	(Sweden) M Gustafsson	6	6
14	(Mexico) L Lavalle	3	6	7
(West Germany) M Stich	6	2	6
(Soviet Union) A Cherkasov	5	3
4	(Argentina) G Pérez Roldán	7	6

Third round
6	(Soviet Union) A Chesnokov	7	6
11	(Sweden) M Gustafsson	6	1
14	(Mexico) L Lavalle	3	7	5
4	(Argentina) G Pérez Roldán	6	6	7

Quarterfinals
6	(Soviet Union) A Chesnokov	3	6	6
4	(Argentina) G Pérez Roldán	6	4	3

==== Section 4 ====
First round
Q	(West Germany) R Haas	0^{r}
(Australia) C Limberger	2
Q	(Argentina) C Miniussi	4	6	4
(Czechoslovakia) M Vajda	6	2	6
Q	(West Germany) A Maurer	1	6	4
Q	(West Germany) D Dier	6	3	6
(Argentina) M Jaite	4	6	6
Q	(Peru) P Arraya	6	1	4

Second round
8	(Australia) M Woodforde	4	4
(Australia) C Limberger	6	6
(Czechoslovakia) M Vajda	3	5
9	(Soviet Union) A Volkov	6	7
16	(Spain) J Sánchez	6	6
Q	(West Germany) D Dier	3	1
(Argentina) M Jaite	6	6
2	(United States) J Connors	4	1

Third round
(Australia) C Limberger	3	3
9	(Soviet Union) A Volkov	6	6
16	(Spain) J Sánchez	7	6
(Argentina) M Jaite	5	3

Quarterfinals
9	(Soviet Union) A Volkov	6	6
16	(Spain) J Sánchez	2	4
