= 1987 Bavarian Tennis Championships – Singles =

Singles
- 1987 Bavarian Tennis Championships

Final
- Champion: (Argentina) Guillermo Pérez Roldán
- Runner-up: (Czechoslovakia) Marián Vajda
- Score: 6–3, 7–6

Details
- Draw: 32
- Seeds: 8

Events
Singles	Doubles
← 1986 ·	Bavarian Tennis Championships	· 1988 →

Emilio Sánchez was the defending champion, but lost in the first round this year.

Guillermo Pérez Roldán won the title, defeating Marián Vajda 6–3, 7–6 in the final.

== Seeds ==
1. (Spain) Emilio Sánchez (first round)
2. (United States) Johan Kriek (quarterfinals)
3. (Sweden) Joakim Nyström (semifinals)
4. (Sweden) Jonas Svensson (first round)
5. (Czechoslovakia) Milan Šrejber (second round)
6. (Austria) Thomas Muster (second round)
7. (West Germany) Eric Jelen (first round)
8. (United States) Jonathan Canter (first round)

== Draw ==
Key

- Q = Qualifier
- WC = Wild card
- LL = Lucky loser
- Alt = Alternate
- ITF = ITF entry
- PR = Protected ranking
- SR = Special ranking
- SE = Special exempt
- JE = Junior exempt
- JR = Junior Accelerator Programme entrant
- CO = College Accelerator Programme entrant
- NG = Next Gen Accelerator Program entrant
- w/o = Walkover
- r = Retired
- d = Defaulted

=== Finals ===
Semifinals
(United States) Mel Purcell	6	5	1
(Argentina) Guillermo Pérez Roldán	1	7	6
WC/3	(Sweden) Joakim Nyström	4	4
Q	(Czechoslovakia) Marián Vajda	6	6

Final
(Argentina) Guillermo Pérez Roldán	6	7
Q	(Czechoslovakia) Marián Vajda	3	6

=== Top half ===
First round
1	(Spain) E Sánchez	5	6	3
(West Germany) C-U Steeb	7	4	6
(Spain) D de Miguel	6	6
(Switzerland) R Stadler	2	0
(United States) M Purcell	6	6
(Australia) M Kratzmann	3	0
WC	(West Germany) T Meinecke	6	2	6
8	(United States) J Canter	4	6	4
4	(Sweden) J Svensson	6	3	2
(Spain) S Casal	3	6	6
(Brazil) C Motta	6	7	7
Q	(Italy) C Aprili	7	5	5
Q	(Netherlands) H van Boeckel	3	1
(Argentina) G Pérez Roldán	6	6
(Argentina) F Davín	6	2	0
6	(Austria) T Muster	1	6	6

Second round
(West Germany) C-U Steeb	6	6
(Spain) D de Miguel	1	2
(United States) M Purcell	6	4	7
WC	(West Germany) T Meinecke	2	6	5
(Spain) S Casal	6	3	6
(Brazil) C Motta	4	6	4
(Argentina) G Pérez Roldán	6	6
6	(Austria) T Muster	2	3

Quarterfinals
(West Germany) C-U Steeb	3	6
(United States) M Purcell	6	7
(Spain) S Casal	7	5	1
(Argentina) G Pérez Roldán	6	7	6

Semifinals
(United States) M Purcell	6	5	1
(Argentina) G Pérez Roldán	1	7	6

=== Bottom half ===
First round
5	(Czechoslovakia) M Šrejber	7	6
(Sweden) J Carlsson	5	2
(Australia) C Limberger	6	6
(West Germany) R Osterthun	2	4
(Argentina) F Yunis	6	6	5
(Brazil) L Mattar	3	7	7
WC	(West Germany) H Schwaier	0	4
WC/3	(Sweden) J Nyström	6	6
7	(West Germany) E Jelen	6	1	1
Q	(Czechoslovakia) M Vajda	3	6	6
(Sweden) S Eriksson	6	6
Q	(Netherlands) T Nijssen	2	1
(Brazil) I Kley	3	5
(United States) J Pugh	6	7
(Spain) J Arrese	6	1	4
2	(United States) J Kriek	3	6	6

Second round
5	(Czechoslovakia) M Šrejber	3	6	3
(Australia) C Limberger	6	3	6
(Brazil) L Mattar	4	6	3
WC/3	(Sweden) J Nyström	6	4	6
Q	(Czechoslovakia) M Vajda	6	3	6
(Sweden) S Eriksson	0	6	0
(United States) J Pugh	4	2
2	(United States) J Kriek	6	6

Quarterfinals
(Australia) C Limberger	6	3
WC/3	(Sweden) J Nyström	7	6
Q	(Czechoslovakia) M Vajda	6	7
2	(United States) J Kriek	2	5

Semifinals
WC/3	(Sweden) J Nyström	4	4
Q	(Czechoslovakia) M Vajda	6	6
