= 1986 Bavarian Tennis Championships – Singles =

Singles
- 1986 Bavarian Tennis Championships

Final
- Champion: (Spain) Emilio Sánchez
- Runner-up: (West Germany) Ricki Osterthun
- Score: 6–1, 6–3

Details
- Draw: 32
- Seeds: 8

Events
Singles	Doubles
← 1985 ·	Bavarian Tennis Championships	· 1987 →

Joakim Nyström was the defending champion, but did not participate this year.

Emilio Sánchez won the title, defeating Ricki Osterthun 6–1, 6–3 in the final.

== Seeds ==
1. (Czechoslovakia) Miloslav Mečíř (quarterfinals)
2. (Switzerland) Heinz Günthardt (first round)
3. (Czechoslovakia) Tomáš Šmíd (second round)
4. (Sweden) Kent Carlsson (quarterfinals)
5. (Spain) Emilio Sánchez (champion)
6. (Australia) Broderick Dyke (first round)
7. (Spain) Sergio Casal (first round)
8. (Belgium) Libor Pimek (second round)

== Draw ==
Key

- Q = Qualifier
- WC = Wild card
- LL = Lucky loser
- Alt = Alternate
- ITF = ITF entry
- PR = Protected ranking
- SR = Special ranking
- SE = Special exempt
- JE = Junior exempt
- JR = Junior Accelerator Programme entrant
- CO = College Accelerator Programme entrant
- NG = Next Gen Accelerator Program entrant
- w/o = Walkover
- r = Retired
- d = Defaulted

=== Finals ===
Semifinals
(Sweden) Jonas Svensson	5	1
5	(Spain) Emilio Sánchez	7	6
(United States) Eliot Teltscher	5	0
(West Germany) Ricki Osterthun	7	6

Final
5	(Spain) Emilio Sánchez	6	6
(West Germany) Ricki Osterthun	1	3

=== Top half ===
First round
1	(Czechoslovakia) M Mečíř	6	6
(Australia) W Masur	3	2
(United Kingdom) J Bates	3	6	4
(Argentina) M Ingaramo	6	3	6
(Australia) S Youl	3	6
(Sweden) J Svensson	6	7
(United States) L Duncan	1	7	4
8	(Belgium) L Pimek	6	6	6
4	(Sweden) K Carlsson	6	6
Q	(Spain) J Bardou	2	3
(Netherlands) M Schapers	5	6	4
(United States) M de Palmer	7	4	6
(Brazil) N Aerts	2	1
(Switzerland) C Mezzadri	6	6
WC	(West Germany) A Stepanek	6	1
5	(Spain) E Sánchez	7	6

Second round
1	(Czechoslovakia) M Mečíř	6	1	6
(Argentina) M Ingaramo	3	6	0
(Sweden) J Svensson	6	6
8	(Belgium) L Pimek	1	1
4	(Sweden) K Carlsson	6	6
(United States) M de Palmer	4	0
(Switzerland) C Mezzadri	2	3
5	(Spain) E Sánchez	6	6

Quarterfinals
1	(Czechoslovakia) M Mečíř	4	1
(Sweden) J Svensson	6	6
4	(Sweden) K Carlsson	6	3	2
5	(Spain) E Sánchez	4	6	6

Semifinals
(Sweden) J Svensson	5	1
5	(Spain) E Sánchez	7	6

=== Bottom half ===
First round
6	(Australia) B Dyke	2	5
(West Germany) E Jelen	6	7
(India) R Krishnan	7	7
Q	(Romania) F Segărceanu	5	5
(Australia) M Woodforde	4	1
(United States) E Teltscher	6	6
(Canada) M Wostenholme	2	7	1
WC/3	(Czechoslovakia) T Šmíd	6	6	6
7	(Spain) S Casal	2	6	3
WC	(West Germany) T Meinecke	6	4	6
(Austria) T Muster	6	6
Q	(West Germany) W Popp	2	2
(Israel) A Mansdorf	5	6	4
(West Germany) R Osterthun	7	0	6
Q	(Spain) F Luna	6	7
2	(Switzerland) H Günthardt	3	6

Second round
(West Germany) E Jelen	5	6	6
(India) R Krishnan	7	2	2
(United States) E Teltscher	6	3	6
WC/3	(Czechoslovakia) T Šmíd	2	6	4
WC	(West Germany) T Meinecke	4	5
(Austria) T Muster	6	7
(West Germany) R Osterthun	6	6
Q	(Spain) F Luna	2	4

Quarterfinals
(West Germany) E Jelen	1	4
(United States) E Teltscher	6	6
(Austria) T Muster	3	3
2	(West Germany) R Osterthun	6	6

Semifinals
(United States) E Teltscher	5	0
(West Germany) R Osterthun	7	6
