= 1987 Bavarian Tennis Championships – Doubles =

Tennis tournament

Doubles
- 1987 Bavarian Tennis Championships

Final
- Champions: (United States) Jim Pugh (United States) Blaine Willenborg
- Runners-up: (Spain) Sergio Casal (Spain) Emilio Sánchez
- Score: 7–6, 4–6, 6–4

Events
Singles	Doubles
← 1986 ·	Bavarian Tennis Championships	· 1988 →

Sergio Casal and Emilio Sánchez were the defending champions.

Jim Pugh and Blaine Willenborg won the title, defeating Casal and Sánchez 7–6, 4–6, 6–4 in the final.

== Seeds ==
1. (Spain) Sergio Casal / (Spain) Emilio Sánchez (final)
2. (Iran) Mansour Bahrami / (France) Loïc Courteau (first round)
3. (West Germany) Eric Jelen / (Sweden) Jonas Svensson (quarterfinals)
4. (Australia) Darren Cahill / (Australia) Mark Kratzmann (first round)

== Draw ==
Key

- Q = Qualifier
- WC = Wild card
- LL = Lucky loser
- Alt = Alternate
- ITF = ITF entry
- PR = Protected ranking
- SR = Special ranking
- SE = Special exempt
- JE = Junior exempt
- JR = Junior Accelerator Programme entrant
- CO = College Accelerator Programme entrant
- NG = Next Gen Accelerator Program entrant
- w/o = Walkover
- r = Retired
- d = Defaulted

=== Draw ===
First round
1	(Spain) S Casal (Spain) E Sánchez	6	6
(Brazil) L Mattar (Brazil) C Motta	2	1
(Spain) J Arrese (Spain) D de Miguel	7	7
(United States) M Purcell (Czechoslovakia) M Šrejber	6	6
4	(Australia) D Cahill (Australia) M Kratzmann	5	6
(Czechoslovakia) S Birner (Czechoslovakia) J Navrátil	7	7
(Brazil) C Kist (West Germany) C-U Steeb	1	4
(Netherlands) T Nijssen (Netherlands) H van Boeckel	6	6
(Australia) C Limberger (Australia) M Woodforde	3	7	4
WC	(West Germany) A Mronz (West Germany) C Saceanu	6	5	6
(Sweden) S Eriksson (Sweden) J Nyström	6	1	1
3	(West Germany) E Jelen (Sweden) J Svensson	4	6	6
(Australia) P McNamara (Australia) L Warder	6	6
(Israel) G Bloom (West Germany) Alex Hornung	3	4
(United States) J Pugh (United States) B Willenborg	6	4	6
2	(Iran) M Bahrami (France) L Courteau	2	6	1

Quarterfinals
1	(Spain) S Casal (Spain) E Sánchez	6	3	6
(Spain) J Arrese (Spain) D de Miguel	3	6	3
(Czechoslovakia) S Birner (Czechoslovakia) J Navrátil	6	7
(Netherlands) T Nijssen (Netherlands) H van Boeckel	2	6
WC	(West Germany) A Mronz (West Germany) C Saceanu	6	6
3	(West Germany) E Jelen (Sweden) J Svensson	3	2
(Australia) P McNamara (Australia) L Warder	3	3
(United States) J Pugh (United States) B Willenborg	6	6

Semifinals
1	(Spain) S Casal (Spain) E Sánchez	6	7
(Czechoslovakia) S Birner (Czechoslovakia) J Navrátil	3	5
WC	(West Germany) A Mronz (West Germany) C Saceanu	2	2
(United States) J Pugh (United States) B Willenborg	6	6

Final
1	(Spain) S Casal (Spain) E Sánchez	6	6	4
(United States) J Pugh (United States) B Willenborg	7	4	6
