= 1985 Bavarian Tennis Championships – Singles =

Singles
- 1985 Bavarian Tennis Championships

Final
- Champion: (Sweden) Joakim Nyström
- Runner-up: (West Germany) Hans Schwaier
- Score: 6–1, 6–0

Details
- Draw: 32
- Seeds: 8

Events
Singles	Doubles
← 1984 ·	Bavarian Tennis Championships	· 1986 →

Libor Pimek was the defending champion, but lost in the second round this year.

Joakim Nyström won the title, defeating Hans Schwaier 6–1, 6–0 in the final.

== Seeds ==
1. (Ecuador) Andrés Gómez (first round)
2. (Sweden) Joakim Nyström (champion)
3. (Czechoslovakia) Libor Pimek (second round)
4. (Czechoslovakia) Miloslav Mečíř (quarterfinals)
5. (Spain) Juan Aguilera (second round)
6. (Argentina) José Luis Clerc (semifinals)
7. (Sweden) Jan Gunnarsson (first round)
8. (West Germany) Hans Schwaier (final)

== Draw ==
Key

- Q = Qualifier
- WC = Wild card
- LL = Lucky loser
- Alt = Alternate
- ITF = ITF entry
- PR = Protected ranking
- SR = Special ranking
- SE = Special exempt
- JE = Junior exempt
- JR = Junior Accelerator Programme entrant
- CO = College Accelerator Programme entrant
- NG = Next Gen Accelerator Program entrant
- w/o = Walkover
- r = Retired
- d = Defaulted

=== Finals ===
Semifinals
(Uruguay) Diego Pérez	4	4
8	(West Germany) Hans Schwaier	6	6
6	(Argentina) José Luis Clerc	2	4
2	(Sweden) Joakim Nyström	6	6

Final
8	(West Germany) Hans Schwaier	1	0
2	(Sweden) Joakim Nyström	6	6

=== Top half ===
First round
1	(Ecuador) A Gómez	5	6	2
(Uruguay) D Pérez	7	3	6
WC	(West Germany) J Becka	6	1	7
WC	(West Germany) R Gehring	3	6	6
(West Germany) P Elter	7	2	4
(Spain) E Sánchez	6	6	6
(Socialist Federal Republic of Yugoslavia) S Živojinović	3	2
5	(Spain) J Aguilera	6	6
3	(Czechoslovakia) L Pimek	6	6
Q	(West Germany) P Vojtíšek	1	1
Q	(West Germany) K Eberhard	5	6	6
(United States) J Brown	7	4	4
(Australia) W Masur	6	4	4
Q	(West Germany) R Osterthun	4	6	6
(Brazil) J Soares	6	3	2
8	(West Germany) H Schwaier	3	6	6

Second round
(Uruguay) D Pérez	6	6
WC	(West Germany) J Becka	3	1
(Spain) E Sánchez	6	6
5	(Spain) J Aguilera	1	3
3	(Czechoslovakia) L Pimek	6	6	3
Q	(West Germany) K Eberhard	1	7	6
Q	(West Germany) R Osterthun	3	6	6
8	(West Germany) H Schwaier	6	3	7

Quarterfinals
(Uruguay) D Pérez	6	7
(Spain) E Sánchez	3	5
Q	(West Germany) K Eberhard	3	3
8	(West Germany) H Schwaier	6	6

Semifinals
(Uruguay) D Pérez	4	4
8	(West Germany) H Schwaier	6	6

=== Bottom half ===
First round
6	(Argentina) J L Clerc	6	6	6
(Australia) J Frawley	7	1	2
WC	(West Germany) M Hipp	7	6	6
(United States) M Bauer	6	7	3
(United States) B Willenborg	6	1
(Peru) P Arraya	7	6
(West Germany) M Westphal	6	1	4
4	(Czechoslovakia) M Mečíř	4	6	6
7	(Sweden) J Gunnarsson	6	4	4
(Czechoslovakia) P Složil	1	6	6
(Brazil) C Motta	6	6
(Hungary) Z Kuhárszky	3	4
(Australia) T Allan	7	4	6
(France) T Benhabiles	6	6	7
Q	(Sweden) S Simonsson	2	3
2	(Sweden) J Nyström	6	6

Second round
6	(Argentina) J L Clerc	6	6
WC	(West Germany) M Hipp	4	2
(Peru) P Arraya	6	2
4	(Czechoslovakia) M Mečíř	7	6
(Czechoslovakia) P Složil	4	3
(Brazil) C Motta	6	6
(France) T Benhabiles	2	6	4
2	(Sweden) J Nyström	6	2	6

Quarterfinals
6	(Argentina) J L Clerc	7	6
4	(Czechoslovakia) M Mečíř	5	3
(Brazil) C Motta	2	6	0
2	(Sweden) J Nyström	6	3	6

Semifinals
6	(Argentina) J L Clerc	2	4
2	(Sweden) J Nyström	6	6
