= 1983 Munich WCT =

- Date: 14–20 March
- Edition: 5th
- Category: World Championship Tennis (WCT)
- Draw: 32S / 16D
- Prize money: $300,000
- Surface: Carpet / indoor
- Location: Munich, West Germany

Champions

Singles
- (United States) Brian Teacher

Doubles
- (South Africa) Kevin Curren / (United States) Steve Denton
- Munich WCT

The 1983 Munich WCT was a men's tennis tournament played on indoor carpet courts in Munich, West Germany. The tournament was part of the 1983 World Championship Tennis circuit. It was the fifth and final edition of the event and was held from 14 March until 20 March 1983. Unseeded Brian Teacher won the singles title.

== Finals ==
=== Singles ===
(United States) Brian Teacher defeated (United States) Mark Dickson 1–6, 6–4, 6–2, 6–3

- It was Teacher's 1st singles title of the year and the 7th of his career.

=== Doubles ===
(South Africa) Kevin Curren / (United States) Steve Denton defeated (Switzerland) Heinz Günthardt / (Hungary) Balázs Taróczy 7–5, 2–6, 6–1

== See also ==
- 1983 Bavarian Tennis Championships
