= 1983 Bavarian Tennis Championships =

- Date: 16–22 May
- Edition: 67th
- Draw: 32S / 16D
- Prize money: $75,000
- Surface: Clay / outdoor
- Location: Munich, West Germany
- Venue: MTTC Iphitos

Champions

Singles
- (Czechoslovakia) Tomáš Šmíd

Doubles
- (New Zealand) Chris Lewis / (Czechoslovakia) Pavel Složil
- Bavarian Tennis Championships

The 1983 Bavarian Tennis Championships was a men's Grand Prix tennis circuit tournament held in Munich, West Germany which was played on outdoor clay courts. It was the 67th edition of the tournament and was held from 16 May through 22 May 1983. First-seeded Tomáš Šmíd won the singles title.

== Finals ==
=== Singles ===
(Czechoslovakia) Tomáš Šmíd defeated (Sweden) Joakim Nyström 6–0, 6–3, 4–6, 2–6, 7–5

- It was Šmid's 5th title of the year and the 26th of his career.

=== Doubles ===
(New Zealand) Chris Lewis / (Czechoslovakia) Pavel Složil defeated (Sweden) Anders Järryd / (Czechoslovakia) Tomáš Šmíd 6–4, 6–2

- It was Lewis's 2nd title of the year and the 9th of his career. It was Slozil's 4th title of the year and the 15th of his career.

== See also ==
- 1983 Munich WCT
