= 1991 BMW Open =

- Date: 29 April – 6 May
- Edition: 75th
- Category: ATP World Series
- Draw: 32S / 16D
- Prize money: $225,000
- Surface: Clay / outdoor
- Location: Munich, Germany
- Venue: MTTC Iphitos

Champions

Singles
- (Sweden) Magnus Gustafsson

Doubles
- (United States) Patrick Galbraith / (United States) Todd Witsken
- BMW Open

The 1991 BMW Open was a men's tennis tournament held in Munich, Germany and played on outdoor clay courts. The event was part of the ATP World Series category of the Association of Tennis Professionals tour. It was the 75th edition of the tournament and was held from 29 April through 6 May 1991. Unseeded Magnus Gustafsson won the singles title.

== Finals ==
=== Singles ===
(Sweden) Magnus Gustafsson defeated (Argentina) Guillermo Pérez Roldán 3–6, 6–3, 4–3 (Perez-Roldan retired)

- It was Gustafsson's 1st title of the year and the 1st of his career.

=== Doubles ===
(United States) Patrick Galbraith / (United States) Todd Witsken defeated (Sweden) Anders Järryd / (South Africa) Danie Visser 7–5, 6–4

- It was Galbraith's 3rd title of the year and the 6th of his career. It was Witsken's 2nd title of the year and the 10th of his career.
