= 1983 Bavarian Tennis Championships – Singles =

Singles
- 1983 Bavarian Tennis Championships

Final
- Champion: (Czechoslovakia) Tomáš Šmíd
- Runner-up: (Sweden) Joakim Nyström
- Score: 6–0, 6–3, 4–6, 2–6, 7–5

Details
- Draw: 32
- Seeds: 8

Events
Singles	Doubles
← 1982 ·	Bavarian Tennis Championships	· 1984 →

Gene Mayer was the defending champion, but did not participate this year.

Tomáš Šmíd won the singles title of the 1983 BMW Open, defeating Joakim Nyström 6–0, 6–3, 4–6, 2–6, 7–5 in the final.

== Seeds ==
1. (Czechoslovakia) Tomáš Šmíd (champion)
2. (United States) Mel Purcell (first round)
3. (Israel) Shlomo Glickstein (first round)
4. (United States) Mike De Palmer (second round)
5. (Spain) Fernando Luna (quarterfinals)
6. (Czechoslovakia) Pavel Složil (quarterfinals)
7. (New Zealand) Chris Lewis (quarterfinals)
8. (Colombia) Jairo Velasco, Sr. (second round)

== Draw ==
Key

- Q = Qualifier
- WC = Wild card
- LL = Lucky loser
- Alt = Alternate
- ITF = ITF entry
- PR = Protected ranking
- SR = Special ranking
- SE = Special exempt
- JE = Junior exempt
- JR = Junior Accelerator Programme entrant
- CO = College Accelerator Programme entrant
- NG = Next Gen Accelerator Program entrant
- w/o = Walkover
- r = Retired
- d = Defaulted

=== Final ===
Semifinals
1	(Czechoslovakia) Tomáš Šmíd	6	6
(Sweden) Hans Simonsson	3	2
(West Germany) Peter Elter	3	6	1
Q	(Sweden) Joakim Nyström	6	3	6

Final
1	(Czechoslovakia) Tomáš Šmíd	6	6	4	2	7
Q	(Sweden) Joakim Nyström	0	3	6	6	5

=== Section 1 ===
First round
1	(Czechoslovakia) T Šmíd	5	6	6
(West Germany) W Popp	7	4	4
(Argentina) A Ganzábal	1	6	5
(Hungary) Z Kuharszky	6	3	7
Q	(United States) E Adams	6	2	6
(West Germany) D Keretić	3	6	2
(Spain) A Tous	5	7	4
7	(New Zealand) C Lewis	7	6	6
3	(Israel) S Glickstein	6	1	3
(Sweden) H Simonsson	3	6	6
(United States) B Manson	6	2	5
(United States) J Borowiak	3	6	7
(Chile) R Acuña	3	0
(United States) E Fromm	6	6
(Brazil) J Soares	3	6	4
5	(Spain) F Luna	6	4	6

Second round
1	(Czechoslovakia) T Šmíd	6	6
(Hungary) Z Kuharszky	2	2
Q	(United States) E Adams	2	6	3
7	(New Zealand) C Lewis	6	2	6
(Sweden) H Simonsson	6	7
(United States) J Borowiak	1	5
(United States) E Fromm	6	2	1
5	(Spain) F Luna	4	6	6

Quarterfinals
1	(Czechoslovakia) T Šmíd	6	6
7	(New Zealand) C Lewis	4	2
(Sweden) H Simonsson	6	3	6
5	(Spain) F Luna	3	6	3

Semifinals
1	(Czechoslovakia) T Šmíd	6	6
(Sweden) H Simonsson	3	2

=== Section 2 ===
First round
6	(Czechoslovakia) P Složil	4	6	6
LL	(Spain) J Aguilera	6	2	4
(United States) P Du Pré	6	7
(West Germany) A Maurer	4	6
(West Germany) P Elter	7	6
(Sweden) A Järryd	6	2
Q	(Argentina) G Guerrero	3	6
4	(United States) M De Palmer	6	7
8	(Colombia) J Velasco, Sr.	6	6
(South Africa) F Sauer	2	1
(West Germany) M Westphal	4	6	6
Q	(West Germany) E Jelen	6	2	2
(France) C Roger-Vasselin	6	7
(United States) T Waltke	2	5
Q	(Sweden) J Nyström	6	7
2	(United States) M Purcell	3	5

Second round
6	(Czechoslovakia) P Složil	7	6
(United States) P Du Pré	5	2
(West Germany) P Elter	6	6
4	(United States) M De Palmer	2	4
8	(Colombia) J Velasco, Sr.	4	6	2
(West Germany) M Westphal	6	3	6
(France) C Roger-Vasselin	4	6	1
Q	(Sweden) J Nyström	6	4	6

Quarterfinals
6	(Czechoslovakia) P Složil	6	0	2
(West Germany) P Elter	4	6	6
(West Germany) M Westphal	6	7	2
Q	(Sweden) J Nyström	7	6	6

Semifinals
(West Germany) P Elter	3	6	1
Q	(Sweden) J Nyström	6	3	6
