= 1986 Bavarian Tennis Championships =

- Date: 5–12 May
- Edition: 70th
- Category: Grand Prix
- Surface: Clay / outdoor
- Location: Munich, West Germany
- Venue: MTTC Iphitos

Champions

Singles
- (Spain) Emilio Sánchez

Doubles
- (Spain) Sergio Casal / (Spain) Emilio Sánchez
- Bavarian Tennis Championships

The 1986 Bavarian Tennis Championships was a men's Grand Prix Tennis Circuit held in Munich, West Germany. The tournament was held from 5 May through 12 May 1986. It is now part of the ATP Tour. Fifth-seeded Emilio Sánchez won the singles title.

== Finals ==
=== Singles ===
(Spain) Emilio Sánchez defeated (West Germany) Ricki Osterthun 6–1, 6–3

- It was Sánchez's 3rd title of the year and the 6th of his career.

=== Doubles ===
(Spain) Sergio Casal / (Spain) Emilio Sánchez defeated (Australia) Broderick Dyke / (Australia) Wally Masur 6–3, 4–6, 6–4

- It was Casal's 1st title of the year and the 5th of his career. It was Sánchez's 2nd title of the year and the 5th of his career.
