= 1985 Bavarian Tennis Championships =

- Date: 6–12 May
- Edition: 69th
- Draw: 32S / 16D
- Prize money: $100,000
- Surface: Clay / outdoor
- Location: Munich, West Germany
- Venue: MTTC Iphitos

Champions

Singles
- (Sweden) Joakim Nyström

Doubles
- (Australia) Mark Edmondson / (Australia) Kim Warwick
- Bavarian Tennis Championships

The 1985 Bavarian Tennis Championships was a Grand Prix Tennis Circuit tournament held in Munich, West Germany which was played on outdoor clay courts. It was the 69th edition of the tournament and was held from 6 May through 12 May 1985. Joakim Nyström won the singles title.

== Finals ==
=== Singles ===
(Sweden) Joakim Nyström defeated (West Germany) Hans Schwaier 6–1, 6–0

- It was Nystrom's 1st title of the year and the 7th of his career.

=== Doubles ===
(Australia) Mark Edmondson / (Australia) Kim Warwick defeated (Spain) Sergio Casal / (Spain) Emilio Sánchez 4–6, 7–5, 7–5

- It was Edmondson's 1st title of the year and the 37th of his career. It was Warwick's 2nd title of the year and the 24th of his career.
