= 1984 Bavarian Tennis Championships =

- Date: 14–20 May
- Edition: 68th
- Draw: 32S / 16D
- Prize money: $75,000
- Surface: Clay / outdoor
- Location: Munich, West Germany
- Venue: MTTC Iphitos

Champions

Singles
- (Czechoslovakia) Libor Pimek

Doubles
- (West Germany) Boris Becker / (Poland) Wojtek Fibak
- Bavarian Tennis Championships

The 1984 Bavarian Tennis Championships was a men's Grand Prix Tennis Circuit tournament held in Munich, West Germany which was played on outdoor clay courts. It was the 68th edition of the tournament and was held from 14 May through 20 May 1984. Libor Pimek won the singles title.

== Finals ==
=== Singles ===
(Czechoslovakia) Libor Pimek defeated (United States) Gene Mayer 6–4, 4–6, 7–6, 6–4

- It was Pimek's 1st title of the year and the 2nd of his career.

=== Doubles ===
(West Germany) Boris Becker / (Poland) Wojtek Fibak defeated (United States) Eric Fromm / (Romania) Florin Segărceanu 6–4, 4–6, 6–1

- It was Becker's only title of the year and the 1st of his career. It was Fibak's 1st title of the year and the 58th of his career.
