= 1989 Bavarian Tennis Championships =

- Date: 1–7 May
- Edition: 73rd
- Category: Grand Prix
- Surface: Clay / outdoor
- Location: Munich, West Germany
- Venue: MTTC Iphitos

Champions

Singles
- (Soviet Union) Andrei Chesnokov

Doubles
- (Spain) Javier Sánchez / (Hungary) Balázs Taróczy
- Bavarian Tennis Championships

The 1989 Bavarian Tennis Championships was an Association of Tennis Professionals men's tennis tournament held on outdoor clay courts in Munich, West Germany. It was the 73rd edition of the tournament was held from 1 May through 7 May 1989. Sixth-seeded Andrei Chesnokov won the singles title.

== Finals ==
=== Singles ===
(Soviet Union) Andrei Chesnokov defeated (Czechoslovakia) Martin Střelba 5–7, 7–6, 6–2

- It was Chesnokov's 2nd title of the year and the 4th of his career.

=== Doubles ===
(Spain) Javier Sánchez / (Hungary) Balázs Taróczy defeated (Australia) Peter Doohan / (Australia) Laurie Warder 7–6, 6–7, 7–6

- It was Sánchez's 1st title of the year and the 5th of his career. It was Taróczy's 1st title of the year and the 26th of his career.
