= 1987 Bavarian Tennis Championships =

- Date: 4–11 May
- Edition: 71st
- Category: Grand Prix
- Draw: 32S / 16D
- Prize money: $150,000
- Surface: Clay / outdoor
- Location: Munich, West Germany
- Venue: MTTC Iphitos

Champions

Singles
- (Argentina) Guillermo Pérez Roldán

Doubles
- (United States) Jim Pugh / (United States) Blaine Willenborg
- Bavarian Tennis Championships

The 1987 Bavarian Tennis Championships was a men's Grand Prix Tennis Circuit tournament held on outdoor clay courts at the MTTC Iphitos in Munich, West Germany. The tournament was held from 4 May through 11 May 1987. It is now part of the ATP Tour. Unseeded Guillermo Pérez Roldán won the singles title.

== Finals ==
=== Singles ===
(Argentina) Guillermo Pérez Roldán defeated (Czechoslovakia) Marián Vajda 6–3, 7–6

- It was Perez-Roldan's 1st singles title of the year and of his career.

=== Doubles ===
(United States) Jim Pugh / (United States) Blaine Willenborg defeated (Spain) Sergio Casal / (Spain) Emilio Sánchez 7–6, 4–6, 6–4

- It was Pugh's 3rd title of the year and the 3rd of his career. It was Willenborg's 1st title of the year and the 6th of his career.
