= 1985 Bavarian Tennis Championships – Doubles =

Doubles
- 1985 Bavarian Tennis Championships

Final
- Champions: (Australia) Mark Edmondson (Australia) Kim Warwick
- Runners-up: (Spain) Sergio Casal (Spain) Emilio Sánchez
- Score: 4–6, 7–5, 7–5

Details
- Draw: 16
- Seeds: 4

Events
Singles	Doubles
- Bavarian Tennis Championships

Boris Becker and Wojtek Fibak were the defending champions, but did not participate this year.

Mark Edmondson and Kim Warwick won the title, defeating Sergio Casal and Emilio Sánchez 4–6, 7–5, 7–5 in the final.

== Seeds ==
1. (Sweden) Joakim Nyström / (Czechoslovakia) Pavel Složil (first round)
2. (Australia) Mark Edmondson / (Australia) Kim Warwick (champions)
3. (Australia) Broderick Dyke / (Australia) Wally Masur (first round)
4. (Sweden) Jan Gunnarsson / (Denmark) Michael Mortensen (first round)

== Draw ==
Key

- Q = Qualifier
- WC = Wild card
- LL = Lucky loser
- Alt = Alternate
- ITF = ITF entry
- PR = Protected ranking
- SR = Special ranking
- SE = Special exempt
- JE = Junior exempt
- JR = Junior Accelerator Programme entrant
- CO = College Accelerator Programme entrant
- NG = Next Gen Accelerator Program entrant
- w/o = Walkover
- r = Retired
- d = Defaulted

=== Draw ===
First round
1	(Sweden) J Nyström (Czechoslovakia) P Složil	6	6	1
(United States) M Bauer (Brazil) C Motta	7	3	6
(United States) D Gitlin (Australia) L Warder	4	1
(Spain) S Casal (Spain) E Sánchez	6	6
3	(Australia) B Dyke (Australia) W Masur	6	3	5
(Czechoslovakia) S Birner (Brazil) J Soares	5	6	7
(Australia) C Fancutt (Australia) J Frawley	3	6	6
(West Germany) S Hermann (West Germany) R Osterthun	6	4	2
(West Germany) P Elter (Australia) C Limberger	6	6
(Hungary) Z Kuharszky (West Germany) A Maurer	1	3
(Czechoslovakia) L Pimek (Socialist Federal Republic of Yugoslavia) S Živojinović	7	6
4	(Sweden) J Gunnarsson (Denmark) M Mortensen	5	4
WC	(Czechoslovakia) M Mečíř (West Germany) H Schwaier	2	1
(Peru) P Arraya (Argentina) J-L Clerc	6	6
(Ecuador) A Gómez (Ecuador) RA Viver	3	4
2	(Australia) M Edmondson (Australia) K Warwick	6	6

Quarterfinals
(United States) M Bauer (Brazil) C Motta	7	4	2
(Spain) S Casal (Spain) E Sánchez	6	6	6
(Czechoslovakia) S Birner (Brazil) J Soares	2	4
(Australia) C Fancutt (Australia) J Frawley	6	6
(West Germany) P Elter (Australia) C Limberger	6	6	4
(Czechoslovakia) L Pimek (Socialist Federal Republic of Yugoslavia) S Živojinović	7	1	6
(Peru) P Arraya (Argentina) J-L Clerc	4	3
2	(Australia) M Edmondson (Australia) K Warwick	6	6

Semifinals
(Spain) S Casal (Spain) E Sánchez	6	3	6
(Australia) C Fancutt (Australia) J Frawley	3	6	4
(Czechoslovakia) L Pimek (Socialist Federal Republic of Yugoslavia) S Živojinović	3	6	3
2	(Australia) M Edmondson (Australia) K Warwick	6	3	6

Final
(Spain) S Casal (Spain) E Sánchez	6	5	5
2	(Australia) M Edmondson (Australia) K Warwick	4	7	7
