= 1989 Bavarian Tennis Championships – Doubles =

Doubles
- 1989 BMW Open

Final
- Champions: (Spain) Javier Sánchez; (Hungary) Balázs Taróczy
- Runners-up: (Australia) Peter Doohan; (Australia) Laurie Warder
- Score: 7–6, 6–7, 7–6

Details
- Draw: 24
- Seeds: 8

Events
Singles	Doubles
- BMW Open

Rick Leach and Jim Pugh were the defending champions, but did not participate this year.

Javier Sánchez and Balázs Taróczy won in the final 7–6, 6–7, 7–6, against Peter Doohan and Laurie Warder.

== Seeds ==
All seeds receive a bye into the second round.

1. (Czechoslovakia) Tomáš Šmíd / (Australia) Mark Woodforde (semifinals)
2. (Australia) Peter Doohan / (Australia) Laurie Warder (final)
3. (Sweden) Stefan Edberg / (Sweden) Jan Gunnarsson (quarterfinals)
4. (Spain) Javier Sánchez / (Hungary) Balázs Taróczy (champions)
5. (Italy) Diego Nargiso / (West Germany) Ricki Osterthun (quarterfinals)
6. (West Germany) Patrik Kühnen / (West Germany) Carl-Uwe Steeb (semifinals)
7. (Argentina) Albert Mancini / (Argentina) Christian Miniussi (second round)
8. (Sweden) Magnus Gustafsson / (Mexico) Leonardo Lavalle (quarterfinals)

== Draw ==
Key

- Q = Qualifier
- WC = Wild card
- LL = Lucky loser
- Alt = Alternate
- ITF = ITF entry
- PR = Protected ranking
- SR = Special ranking
- SE = Special exempt
- JE = Junior exempt
- JR = Junior Accelerator Programme entrant
- CO = College Accelerator Programme entrant
- NG = Next Gen Accelerator Program entrant
- w/o = Walkover
- r = Retired
- d = Defaulted

=== Finals ===
Semifinals

Final

1
- (Czechoslovakia) Tomáš Šmíd
- (Australia) Mark Woodforde
6
3

4
- (Spain) Javier Sánchez
- (Hungary) Balázs Taróczy
7
6

4
- (Spain) Javier Sánchez
- (Hungary) Balázs Taróczy
7
6
7

2
- (Australia) Peter Doohan
- (Australia) Laurie Warder
6
7
6

6
- (West Germany) Patrik Kühnen
- (West Germany) Carl-Uwe Steeb
2
3

2
- (Australia) Peter Doohan
- (Australia) Laurie Warder
6
6

=== Top half ===
First round

Second round

Quarterfinals

Semifinals

1
- (Czechoslovakia) T Šmíd
- (Australia) M Woodforde
6
6

WC
- (Spain) S Casal
- (United States) J Connors
3
4

- (West Germany) T Meinecke
- (West Germany) M Stich
4
2

- (West Germany) T Meinecke
- (West Germany) M Stich
6
6

1
- (Czechoslovakia) T Šmíd
- (Australia) M Woodforde
7
6

- (Soviet Union) A Cherkasov
- (Soviet Union) A Olhovskiy
7
7

- (Soviet Union) A Cherkasov
- (Soviet Union) A Olhovskiy
6
4

- (Spain) J Clavet
- (Socialist Federal Republic of Yugoslavia) I Flego
5
6

- (Soviet Union) A Cherkasov
- (Soviet Union) A Olhovskiy
6
6

7
- (Argentina) A Mancini
- (Argentina) C Miniussi
4
1

1
- (Czechoslovakia) T Šmíd
- (Australia) M Woodforde
6
3

4
- (Spain) J Sánchez
- (Hungary) B Taróczy
7
6

4
- (Spain) J Sánchez
- (Hungary) B Taróczy
6
6

- (Peru) P Arraya
- (United States) D Rostagno
5
6
7

- (Peru) P Arraya
- (United States) D Rostagno
1
1

- (Czechoslovakia) J Bulant
- (Czechoslovakia) M Vajda
7
4
6

4
- (Spain) J Sánchez
- (Hungary) B Taróczy
6
6

- (Czechoslovakia) K Nováček
- (Czechoslovakia) C Suk
6
6
2

5
- (Italy) D Nargiso
- (West Germany) R Osterthun
3
3

- (West Germany) A Maurer
- (Czechoslovakia) B Stankovič
0
7
6

- (West Germany) A Maurer
- (Czechoslovakia) B Stankovič
1
5

5
- (Italy) D Nargiso
- (West Germany) R Osterthun
6
7

=== Bottom half ===
First round

Second round

Quarterfinals

Semifinals

6
- (West Germany) P Kühnen
- (West Germany) C-U Steeb
6
6
6

- (Sweden) N Kulti
- (Sweden) N Utgren
3
3

WC
- (Soviet Union) A Chesnokov
- (Soviet Union) A Volkov
7
4
3

WC
- (Soviet Union) A Chesnokov
- (Soviet Union) A Volkov
6
6

6
- (West Germany) P Kühnen
- (West Germany) C-U Steeb
7
7

- (Argentina) M Ingaramo
- (Chile) P Rebolledo
6
2
1

3
- (Sweden) S Edberg
- (Sweden) J Gunnarsson
5
5

- (Spain) E Sánchez
- (Sweden) J Svensson
4
6
6

- (Spain) E Sánchez
- (Sweden) J Svensson
3
7
4

3
- (Sweden) S Edberg
- (Sweden) J Gunnarsson
6
6
6

6
- (West Germany) P Kühnen
- (West Germany) C-U Steeb
2
3

2
- (Australia) P Doohan
- (Australia) L Warder
6
6

8
- (Sweden) M Gustafsson
- (Mexico) L Lavalle
6
6

- (United States) R Baxter
- (United Kingdom) D Felgate
5
6

- (West Germany) K Braasch
- (West Germany) H Schwaier
3
2

- (West Germany) K Braasch
- (West Germany) H Schwaier
7
7

8
- (Sweden) M Gustafsson
- (Mexico) L Lavalle
3
4

- (Argentina) G Luza
- (Argentina) G Pérez Roldán
7
6

2
- (Australia) P Doohan
- (Australia) L Warder
6
6

- (Argentina) P Albano
- (Argentina) M Jaite
6
1

- (Argentina) G Luza
- (Argentina) G Pérez Roldán
3
7
4

2
- (Australia) P Doohan
- (Australia) L Warder
6
5
6
