= 1983 Bavarian Tennis Championships – Doubles =

Doubles
- 1983 Bavarian Tennis Championships

Final
- Champions: (New Zealand) Chris Lewis (Czechoslovakia) Pavel Složil
- Runners-up: (Sweden) Anders Järryd (Czechoslovakia) Tomáš Šmíd
- Score: 6–4, 6–2

Details
- Draw: 16
- Seeds: 4

Events
Singles	Doubles
- Bavarian Tennis Championships

Chip Hooper and Mel Purcell were the defending champions, but Hooper did not participate this year. Purcell partnered Trey Waltke, losing in the semifinals.

Chris Lewis and Pavel Složil won the title, defeating Anders Järryd and Tomáš Šmíd 6–4, 6–2 in the final.

== Seeds ==
1. (Sweden) Anders Järryd / (Czechoslovakia) Tomáš Šmíd (final)
2. (New Zealand) Chris Lewis / (Czechoslovakia) Pavel Složil (champions)
3. (United States) Eric Fromm / (Israel) Shlomo Glickstein (quarterfinals)
4. (Czechoslovakia) Stanislav Birner / (Brazil) João Soares (first round)

== Draw ==
Key

- Q = Qualifier
- WC = Wild card
- LL = Lucky loser
- Alt = Alternate
- ITF = ITF entry
- PR = Protected ranking
- SR = Special ranking
- SE = Special exempt
- JE = Junior exempt
- JR = Junior Accelerator Programme entrant
- CO = College Accelerator Programme entrant
- NG = Next Gen Accelerator Program entrant
- w/o = Walkover
- r = Retired
- d = Defaulted

=== Draw ===
First round
1	(Sweden) A Järryd (Czechoslovakia) T Šmíd	6	6	6
(Chile) R Acuña (Argentina) A Ganzábal	7	4	4
(West Germany) A Maurer (West Germany) W Popp	6	6
(West Germany) Uli Heyne (Socialist Federal Republic of Yugoslavia) Miodrac Mijuca	2	4
4	(Czechoslovakia) S Birner (Brazil) J Soares	7	5	6
(United States) M Purcell (United States) T Waltke	6	7	7
(United States) P Du Pré (United States) B Manson	7	4	6
(Spain) F Luna (Chile) A Pierola	6	6	0
(Spain) A Tous (Colombia) J Velasco Sr.	6	6	6
(West Germany) P Elter (France) C Roger-Vasselin	4	7	1
(South Africa) F Sauer (South Africa) S van der Merwe	5	1
3	(United States) E Fromm (Israel) S Glickstein	7	6
(Canada) J Brabenec (United States) M De Palmer	3	6	7
(South Africa) B Mitton (South Africa) R Moore	6	4	5
(West Germany) D Keretić (West Germany) H Theissen	1	4
2	(New Zealand) C Lewis (Czechoslovakia) P Složil	6	6

Quarterfinals
1	(Sweden) A Järryd (Czechoslovakia) T Šmíd	4	7	6
(West Germany) A Maurer (West Germany) W Popp	6	6	1
(United States) M Purcell (United States) T Waltke	7	6
(United States) P Du Pré (United States) B Manson	5	1
(Spain) A Tous (Colombia) J Velasco Sr.	7	6
3	(United States) E Fromm (Israel) S Glickstein	5	3
(Canada) J Brabenec (United States) M De Palmer	6	5	4
2	(New Zealand) C Lewis (Czechoslovakia) P Složil	3	7	6

Semifinals
1	(Sweden) A Järryd (Czechoslovakia) T Šmíd	6	6
(United States) M Purcell (United States) T Waltke	1	2
(Spain) A Tous (Colombia) J Velasco Sr.	1	4
2	(New Zealand) C Lewis (Czechoslovakia) P Složil	6	6

Final
1	(Sweden) A Järryd (Czechoslovakia) T Šmíd	4	2
2	(New Zealand) C Lewis (Czechoslovakia) P Složil	6	6
