= 1990 BMW Open =

- Date: 30 April – 7 May
- Edition: 74th
- Category: World Series
- Draw: 32S/16D
- Surface: Clay / outdoor
- Location: Munich, West Germany
- Venue: MTTC Iphitos

Champions

Singles
- (Czechoslovakia) Karel Nováček

Doubles
- (West Germany) Udo Riglewski / (West Germany) Michael Stich
- BMW Open

The 1990 BMW Open was an Association of Tennis Professionals men's tennis tournament held on outdoor clay courts in Munich, West Germany. The tournament was held from 30 April to 7 May 1990. Unseeded Karel Nováček won the singles title.

== Finals ==
=== Singles ===
(Czechoslovakia) Karel Nováček defeated (Austria) Thomas Muster 6–4, 6–2

- It was Novacek's only title of the year and the 3rd of his career.

=== Doubles ===
(West Germany) Udo Riglewski / (West Germany) Michael Stich defeated (Czechoslovakia) Petr Korda / (Czechoslovakia) Tomáš Šmíd 6–1, 6–4

- It was Riglewski's 3rd title of the year and the 8th of his career. It was Stich's 3rd title of the year and the 4th of his career.
