= Jens Wöhrmann =

German tennis player (born 1967)

- ITF name: Jens Woehrmann
- Country (sports): West Germany; Germany
- Born: 8 September 1967 (age 57); Siegen
- Height: 1.80 m (5 ft 11 in)
- Plays: Right-handed
- Prize money: $165,790

Singles
- Career record: 20–28
- Career titles: 0
- Highest ranking: No. 54 (13 Nov 1989)

Grand Slam singles results
- Australian Open: 2R (1990)
- Wimbledon: 2R (1990)

Doubles
- Career record: 0–3
- Career titles: 0
- Highest ranking: No. 311 (25 Nov 1991)

Jens Wöhrmann (born 8 September 1967) is a former professional tennis player from Germany.

== Career ==
Wöhrmann had a win over world number nine Jakob Hlasek en route to a semi-final exit at the Stuttgart Outdoor tournament in 1989. He finished the season well, making the quarter-finals in Frankfurt and in the Stockholm Open.

Now ranked in the top 100, Wöhrmann gained direct entry into the 1990 Australian Open, his first Grand Slam appearance. He defeated Soviet player Andres Võsand in the opening round, then lost in four sets to Lars-Anders Wahlgren. At the 1990 Wimbledon Championships he also made the second round, where he was beaten by Milan Šrejber. He had defeated American Brian Garrow in the first round. In the 1990 BMW Open he had two big wins, over Yannick Noah (for the second time in his career) and countryman Carl-Uwe Steeb. He lost to Petr Korda in the quarter-finals. Also that year, Wöhrmann represented West Germany in a Davis Cup tie against Argentina in Buenos Aires. The German played the first rubber, against Alberto Mancini, which he lost.

== Challenger titles ==
=== Singles: (1) ===
No.	Year	Tournament	Surface	Opponent	Score
1.	1991	Casablanca, Morocco	Clay	(Portugal) Bernardo Mota	6–3, 6–1

=== Doubles: (1) ===
No.	Year	Tournament	Surface	Partner	Opponents	Score
1.	1990	Munich, Germany	Carpet	(Germany) Markus Zoecke	(Soviet Union) Dimitri Poliakov (Socialist Federal Republic of Yugoslavia) Slobodan Vojinović	6–4, 6–3
