= Hans Schwaier =

German tennis player

- Country (sports): West Germany
- Residence: Bavaria
- Born: 24 March 1964 (age 60); Mindelheim, West Germany
- Height: 1.73 m (5 ft 8 in)
- Turned pro: 1983
- Plays: Right-handed
- Prize money: $295,886

Singles
- Career record: 62–89
- Career titles: 0
- Highest ranking: No. 38 (9 September 1985)

Grand Slam singles results
- French Open: 2R (1984)
- Wimbledon: 2R (1984, 1985, 1986)
- US Open: 3R (1985)

Doubles
- Career record: 10-26
- Career titles: 0
- Highest ranking: No. 158 (4 July 1988)

Hans Schwaier (born 24 March 1964) is a former professional tennis player from West Germany.

== Career ==
Schwaier was runner-up to Thomas Högstedt in the boys' singles at the 1981 US Open, the same year he also reached the Wimbledon semi-finals and made it to number three in the world junior rankings.

The West German turned professional in 1983 and was semi-finalist at Kitzbühel that year. He reached the semi-finals at Barcelona in 1984 and en route defeated world number 14 Tomáš Šmíd, for the second time in the space of two months. His best year was 1985, when he made his only Grand Prix final, at the 1985 BMW Open and also reached the semi-finals in Bari and Nice, as well as making it to the quarter-final stage in Basel and Indianapolis. He defeated the 11th ranked player in the world, Andrés Gómez, at Rome in 1986.

From 1984 to 1986 he participated in the main draw of every Grand Slam event, except Australian Opens. His other appearances came in the 1987 French Open and 1990 French Open. He had his best result in the 1985 US Open, where he reached the third round, with wins over Balázs Taróczy and Tony Mmoh. On four occasions during his career, Schwaier was eliminated from a Grand Slam tournament after losing a five set match.

He made his Davis Cup debut for West Germany in their 1984 World Group relegation play-off against Romania. He won both of his singles rubbers, against Adrian Marcu and Andrei Dîrzu. In 1985 he helped the West Germans overcome the United States with a five set win over Aaron Krickstein, won 8–6 in the final set. In his second rubber, Schwaier lost to Eliot Teltscher, but Boris Becker would secure the tie for West Germany. He also played World Team Cup tennis for his country and has a win over Pat Cash to his credit, when the Australian was ranked in the top ten.

== Grand Prix career finals ==
=== Singles: 1 (0–1) ===
Result	W–L	Date	Tournament	Surface	Opponent	Score
Loss	0–1	May 1985	Munich, West Germany	Clay	(Sweden) Joakim Nyström	1–6, 0–6

== Challenger titles ==
=== Singles: (3) ===
No.	Year	Tournament	Surface	Opponent	Score
1.	1985	Tunis, Tunisia	Clay	(West Germany) Wolfgang Popp	6–4, 6–2
2.	1986	Casablanca, Morocco	Clay	(Sweden) Jörgen Windahl	6–3, 6–3
3.	1987	Messina, Italy	Clay	(West Germany) Markus Rackl	6–3, 4–6, 6–4
